= 1988 World Junior Championships in Athletics – Women's 4 × 100 metres relay =

The women's 4×100 metres relay event at the 1988 World Junior Championships in Athletics was held in Sudbury, Ontario, Canada, at Laurentian University Stadium on 30 and 31 July.

== Medalists ==
Gold	Grit Breuer; Katrin Krabbe; Diana Dietz; Katrin Henke; East Germany
Silver	Eusebia Riquelme; Liliana Allen; Aliuska López; Ana Valdivia; Cuba
Bronze	Angela Burnham; Kendra Mackey; Frenchie Holmes; Esther Jones; United States

== Results ==
=== Final ===
31 July

Rank	Nation	Competitors	Time	Notes
1st place, gold medalist(s)	East Germany	Grit Breuer; Katrin Krabbe; Diana Dietz; Katrin Henke	43.48	
2nd place, silver medalist(s)	Cuba	Eusebia Riquelme; Liliana Allen; Aliuska López; Ana Valdivia	44.04	
3rd place, bronze medalist(s)	United States	Angela Burnham; Kendra Mackey; Frenchie Holmes; Esther Jones	44.27	
4	France	Cécile Peyre; Magalie Simioneck; Natacha Cilirié; Odiah Sidibé	44.88	
5	United Kingdom	Stephi Douglas; Kathleen Lithgow; Rachel Kirby; Jacqui Agyepong	44.91	
6	Jamaica	Orlene McIntosh; Revolie Campbell; Beverly McDonald; Michelle Freeman	45.04	
7	West Germany	Angelika Haggenmüller; Anke Feller; Monika Schoy; Solveig Pribnow	45.56	
	Soviet Union	Anzhela Golovchenko; Oksana Kovalyova; Zhanna Tarnopolskaya; Nadezhda Chistyakova	DNF	

=== Heats ===
30 July

==== Heat 1 ====
Rank	Nation	Competitors	Time	Notes
1	East Germany	Grit Breuer; Katrin Krabbe; Diana Dietz; Katrin Henke	43.76	Q
2	Soviet Union	Oksana Kovalyova; Anzhela Golovchenko; Zhanna Tarnopolskaya; Nadezhda Chistyakova	44.64	Q
3	France	Cécile Peyre; Magalie Simioneck; Natacha Cilirié; Odiah Sidibé	44.91	q
4	United Kingdom	Stephi Douglas; Kathleen Lithgow; Rachel Kirby; Jacqui Agyepong	44.99	q
5	Finland	Marjo Liminka; Sanna Hernesniemi; Tarja Leveelahti; Sanni Suhonen	46.12	
6	Canada	Karen Clarke; Val Beckles; Charmaine Gilgeous; Nicolle Gillis	46.16	
7	Chinese Taipei	Wang Huei-Chen; Wang Shu-Hua; Chen Ya-Li; Su Huei-Chun	46.59	
8	Spain	Begoña Yúdice; Cristina Castro; Marta Onate; Patricia Morales	46.74	

==== Heat 2 ====
Rank	Nation	Competitors	Time	Notes
1	Cuba	Eusebia Riquelme; Aliuska López; Ana Valdivia; Liliana Allen	44.25	Q
2	United States	Angela Burnham; Kendra Mackey; Frenchie Holmes; Esther Jones	44.25	Q
3	West Germany	Angelika Haggenmüller; Anke Feller; Monika Schoy; Solveig Pribnow	45.03	Q
4	Jamaica	Orlene McIntosh; Revolie Campbell; Beverly McDonald; Michelle Freeman	45.05	q
5	Switzerland	Petra Osterwalder; Sandra Roth; Sara Wüest; Esther Luedi	45.20	
6	China	Ge Weidong; Li Guilian; Wang Ping; Li Shuxiang	45.91	
7	Australia	Monique Dunstan; Kylie Hanigan; Kerri Kinnane; Amanda Christie	45.93	
8	Netherlands	Nelleke Koppelaar; Annique Goudemond; Annerose Scholsberg; Monique Bogaards	46.43	

== Participation ==
According to an unofficial count, 64 athletes from 16 countries participated in the event.

- Australia (4)
- Canada (4)
- China (4)
- Chinese Taipei (4)
- Cuba (4)
- East Germany (4)
- Finland (4)
- France (4)
- Jamaica (4)
- Netherlands (4)
- Soviet Union (4)
- Spain (4)
- Switzerland (4)
- United Kingdom (4)
- United States (4)
- West Germany (4)
