= 1988 World Junior Championships in Athletics – Women's 100 metres =

The women's 100 metres event at the 1988 World Junior Championships in Athletics was held in Sudbury, Ontario, Canada, at Laurentian University Stadium on 27 and 28 July.

== Medalists ==
Gold	Diana Dietz; East Germany
Silver	Katrin Krabbe; East Germany
Bronze	Liliana Allen; Cuba

== Results ==
=== Final ===
28 July
Wind: -0.4 m/s

Rank	Name	Nationality	Time	Notes
1st place, gold medalist(s)	Diana Dietz	East Germany	11.18	
2nd place, silver medalist(s)	Katrin Krabbe	East Germany	11.23	
3rd place, bronze medalist(s)	Liliana Allen	Cuba	11.36	
4	Esther Jones	United States	11.45	
5	Eusebia Riquelme	Cuba	11.57	
6	Angela Burnham	United States	11.73	
7	Beverly McDonald	Jamaica	11.74	
8	Anzhela Golovchenko	Soviet Union	11.77	

=== Semifinals ===
28 July

==== Semifinal 1 ====
Wind: -0.7 m/s

Rank	Name	Nationality	Time	Notes
1	Liliana Allen	Cuba	11.49	Q
2	Esther Jones	United States	11.53	Q
3	Magalie Simioneck	France	11.75	
4	Michelle Freeman	Jamaica	11.90	
5	Chandra Sturrup	Bahamas	11.93	
6	Lucrécia Jardim	Portugal	11.96	
7	Ge Weidong	China	12.12	
8	Sanna Hernesniemi	Finland	12.14	

==== Semifinal 2 ====
Wind: -0.9 m/s

Rank	Name	Nationality	Time	Notes
1	Katrin Krabbe	East Germany	11.34	Q
2	Eusebia Riquelme	Cuba	11.65	Q
3	Stephi Douglas	United Kingdom	11.79	
4	Cristina Castro	Spain	11.88	
5	Carine Finck	Belgium	11.96	
6	Cécile Peyre	France	11.97	
7	Sonia Vigati	Italy	12.04	
8	Nadezhda Rotach	Soviet Union	12.20	

==== Semifinal 3 ====
Wind: +0.5 m/s

Rank	Name	Nationality	Time	Notes
1	Diana Dietz	East Germany	11.25	Q
2	Anzhela Golovchenko	Soviet Union	11.64	Q
3	Angela Burnham	United States	11.67	q
4	Beverly McDonald	Jamaica	11.73	q
5	Ximena Restrepo	Colombia	11.83	
6	Katerína Kóffa	Greece	11.91	
7	Luo Zhonghua	China	12.00	
8	Monique Bogaards	Netherlands	12.14	

=== Heats ===
27 July

==== Heat 1 ====
Wind: +1.3 m/s

Rank	Name	Nationality	Time	Notes
1	Luo Zhonghua	China	11.73	Q
2	Michelle Freeman	Jamaica	11.74	Q
3	Nadezhda Rotach	Soviet Union	11.87	q
4	Charmaine Gilgeous	Canada	11.93	
5	Wang Huei-Chen	Chinese Taipei	12.12	
6	Erin Tierney	Cook Islands	12.65	
7	Deirdre Caruana	Malta	12.66	

==== Heat 2 ====
Wind: +1.0 m/s

Rank	Name	Nationality	Time	Notes
1	Magalie Simioneck	France	11.63	Q
2	Lucrécia Jardim	Portugal	11.76	Q
3	Chen Ya-Li	Chinese Taipei	11.94	
4	Karen Clarke	Canada	12.05	
5	Rita Gomes	Brazil	12.18	
6	Muyegbe Mabala	Zaire	13.04	
7	Malia Makisi	Tonga	13.76	

==== Heat 3 ====
Wind: +2.3 m/s

Rank	Name	Nationality	Time	Notes
1	Stephi Douglas	United Kingdom	11.50 w	Q
2	Angela Burnham	United States	11.59 w	Q
3	Eusebia Riquelme	Cuba	11.77 w	q
4	Monique Bogaards	Netherlands	11.90 w	q
5	Patricia Foufoué	Côte d'Ivoire	12.09 w	
6	Oumou Sow	Guinea	12.59 w	
7	Carol Quiros Delgado	Costa Rica	12.65 w	
	Rajab Intarsar	Sudan	DQ	

==== Heat 4 ====
Wind: +2.3 m/s

Rank	Name	Nationality	Time	Notes
1	Esther Jones	United States	11.34 w	Q
2	Ximena Restrepo	Colombia	11.58 w	Q
3	Sonia Vigati	Italy	11.63 w	q
4	Cécile Peyre	France	11.73 w	q
5	Sanna Hernesniemi	Finland	11.77 w	q
6	Monique Dunstan	Australia	11.91 w	
7	Monica Rahanitraniriana	Madagascar	12.55 w	
8	Dorothy Isidore	Seychelles	13.32 w	

==== Heat 5 ====
Wind: +2.1 m/s

Rank	Name	Nationality	Time	Notes
1	Liliana Allen	Cuba	11.47 w	Q
2	Beverly McDonald	Jamaica	11.66 w	Q
3	Katerína Kóffa	Greece	11.77 w	q
4	Monika Schoy	West Germany	12.00 w	
5	Barbara Witola	Zambia	12.11 w	
6	Terry Daley	U.S. Virgin Islands	12.16 w	

==== Heat 6 ====
Wind: +0.9 m/s

Rank	Name	Nationality	Time	Notes
1	Katrin Krabbe	East Germany	11.22	Q
2	Anzhela Golovchenko	Soviet Union	11.70	Q
3	Carine Finck	Belgium	11.75	q
4	Kerri Kinnane	Australia	12.02	
5	Ndèye Aminata Niang	Senegal	12.35	
6	Oreh Coker	Sierra Leone	13.01	

==== Heat 7 ====
Wind: +2.1 m/s

Rank	Name	Nationality	Time	Notes
1	Diana Dietz	East Germany	11.18 w	Q
2	Cristina Castro	Spain	11.66 w	Q
3	Chandra Sturrup	Bahamas	11.70 w	q
4	Ge Weidong	China	11.81 w	q
5	Felicia Amajali	Nigeria	11.92 w	
6	Súsanna Helgadóttir	Iceland	12.00 w	
7	Gili Dishon	Israel	12.19 w	

== Participation ==
According to an unofficial count, 49 athletes from 39 countries participated in the event.

- Australia (2)
- Bahamas (1)
- Belgium (1)
- Brazil (1)
- Canada (2)
- China (2)
- Chinese Taipei (2)
- Colombia (1)
- Cook Islands (1)
- Costa Rica (1)
- Côte d'Ivoire (1)
- Cuba (2)
- East Germany (2)
- Finland (1)
- France (2)
- Greece (1)
- Guinea (1)
- Iceland (1)
- Israel (1)
- Italy (1)
- Jamaica (2)
- Madagascar (1)
- Malta (1)
- Netherlands (1)
- Nigeria (1)
- Portugal (1)
- Senegal (1)
- Seychelles (1)
- Sierra Leone (1)
- Soviet Union (2)
- Spain (1)
- Sudan (1)
- Tonga (1)
- United Kingdom (1)
- United States (2)
- U.S. Virgin Islands (1)
- West Germany (1)
- Zaire (1)
- Zambia (1)
