= 1988 World Junior Championships in Athletics – Women's 200 metres =

The women's 200 metres event at the 1988 World Junior Championships in Athletics was held in Sudbury, Ontario, Canada, at Laurentian University Stadium on 29 and 30 July.

== Medalists ==
Gold	Katrin Krabbe; East Germany
Silver	Diana Dietz; East Germany
Bronze	Liliana Allen; Cuba

== Results ==
=== Final ===
30 July
Wind: +2.3 m/s

Rank	Name	Nationality	Time	Notes
1st place, gold medalist(s)	Katrin Krabbe	East Germany	22.34 w	
2nd place, silver medalist(s)	Diana Dietz	East Germany	22.88 w	
3rd place, bronze medalist(s)	Liliana Allen	Cuba	22.97 w	
4	Esther Jones	United States	23.00 w	
5	Angelika Haggenmüller	West Germany	23.36 w	
6	Oksana Kovalyova	Soviet Union	23.64 w	
7	Revolie Campbell	Jamaica	23.66 w	
8	Nadezhda Chistyakova	Soviet Union	24.26 w	

=== Semifinals ===
29 July

==== Semifinal 1 ====
Wind: +2.2 m/s

Rank	Name	Nationality	Time	Notes
1	Esther Jones	United States	23.24 w	Q
2	Angelika Haggenmüller	West Germany	23.26 w	Q
3	Nadezhda Chistyakova	Soviet Union	23.80 w	q
4	Natacha Cilirié	France	23.89 w	
5	Tarja Leveelahti	Finland	24.00 w	
6	Katerína Kóffa	Greece	24.31 w	
7	Carine Finck	Belgium	24.47 w	
	Orlene McIntosh	Jamaica	DNS w	

==== Semifinal 2 ====
Wind: +2.1 m/s

Rank	Name	Nationality	Time	Notes
1	Katrin Krabbe	East Germany	22.97 w	Q
2	Oksana Kovalyova	Soviet Union	23.89 w	Q
3	Ximena Restrepo	Colombia	23.90 w	
4	Anne Leseur	France	24.28 w	
5	Lucrécia Jardim	Portugal	24.32 w	
6	Jupira da Graça	Brazil	24.34 w	
7	Diana Strasser	Austria	24.80 w	
	Rachel Kirby	United Kingdom	DNS w	

==== Semifinal 3 ====
Wind: +2.7 m/s

Rank	Name	Nationality	Time	Notes
1	Diana Dietz	East Germany	23.31 w	Q
2	Liliana Allen	Cuba	23.37 w	Q
3	Revolie Campbell	Jamaica	23.74 w	q
4	Chandra Sturrup	Bahamas	23.96 w	
5	Kendra Mackey	United States	23.96 w	
6	Daniela Plescan	Romania	24.02 w	
7	Petra Osterwalder	Switzerland	24.32 w	
8	Cristina Castro	Spain	24.38 w	

=== Heats ===
29 July

==== Heat 1 ====
Wind: +2.0 m/s

Rank	Name	Nationality	Time	Notes
1	Liliana Allen	Cuba	23.61	Q
2	Ximena Restrepo	Colombia	23.84	Q
3	Katerína Kóffa	Greece	24.31	q
4	Wang Ping	China	24.44	
5	Annique Goudemond	Netherlands	24.62	
6	Claudia Riquelme	Chile	25.37	
7	Anna Cherry	Saint Lucia	25.59	

==== Heat 2 ====
Wind: +2.6 m/s

Rank	Name	Nationality	Time	Notes
1	Diana Dietz	East Germany	23.21 w	Q
2	Angelika Haggenmüller	West Germany	23.33 w	Q
3	Chandra Sturrup	Bahamas	24.00 w	q
4	Carine Finck	Belgium	24.29 w	q
5	Cristina Castro	Spain	24.37 w	q
6	Ana Valdivia	Cuba	24.72 w	
7	Jacqueline Sophia	Netherlands Antilles	25.18 w	
8	Oumou Sow	Guinea	26.32 w	

==== Heat 3 ====
Wind: +1.2 m/s

Rank	Name	Nationality	Time	Notes
1	Revolie Campbell	Jamaica	23.74	Q
2	Daniela Plescan	Romania	24.23	Q
3	Annerose Scholsberg	Netherlands	24.42	
4	Karen Clarke	Canada	24.43	
5	Kylie Hanigan	Australia	24.52	
6	Ndèye Aminata Niang	Senegal	25.25	
7	Grace Ofori	Ghana	25.30	

==== Heat 4 ====
Wind: +2.3 m/s

Rank	Name	Nationality	Time	Notes
1	Oksana Kovalyova	Soviet Union	23.56 w	Q
2	Natacha Cilirié	France	23.85 w	Q
3	Diana Strasser	Austria	24.05 w	q
4	Chen Ya-Li	Chinese Taipei	24.52 w	
5	Kathleen Lithgow	United Kingdom	24.60 w	
6	Christine Duvergé	Mauritius	25.47 w	
7	Oreh Coker	Sierra Leone	27.21 w	

==== Heat 5 ====
Wind: +1.9 m/s

Rank	Name	Nationality	Time	Notes
1	Orlene McIntosh	Jamaica	23.85	Q
2	Kendra Mackey	United States	24.00	Q
3	Jupira da Graça	Brazil	24.28	q
4	Rachel Kirby	United Kingdom	24.32	q
5	Marina Filipović	Yugoslavia	24.83	
6	Terry Daley	U.S. Virgin Islands	25.02	
7	Wang Huei-Chen	Chinese Taipei	25.36	
8	Mariama Ouiminga	Burkina Faso	26.88	

==== Heat 6 ====
Wind: +1.7 m/s

Rank	Name	Nationality	Time	Notes
1	Anne Leseur	France	23.96	Q
2	Tarja Leveelahti	Finland	24.05	Q
3	Nadezhda Chistyakova	Soviet Union	24.05	q
4	Li Guilian	China	24.64	
5	Kerri Kinnane	Australia	24.75	
6	Kinga Fodor	Hungary	25.49	

==== Heat 7 ====
Wind: +1.6 m/s

Rank	Name	Nationality	Time	Notes
1	Esther Jones	United States	23.47	Q
2	Lucrécia Jardim	Portugal	24.11	Q
3	Sanna Hernesniemi	Finland	24.53	
4	Stacy Bowen	Canada	25.12	
5	Marta Onate	Spain	25.25	
	Deirdre Caruana	Malta	DQ	

==== Heat 8 ====
Wind: +2.3 m/s

Rank	Name	Nationality	Time	Notes
1	Katrin Krabbe	East Germany	23.30 w	Q
2	Petra Osterwalder	Switzerland	24.19 w	Q
3	Sabine Kirchmaier	Austria	24.42 w	
4	Gili Dishon	Israel	25.55 w	
5	Muyegbe Mabala	Zaire	27.05 w	
	Barbara Witola	Zambia	DQ	

== Participation ==
According to an unofficial count, 55 athletes from 40 countries participated in the event.

- Australia (2)
- Austria (2)
- Bahamas (1)
- Belgium (1)
- Brazil (1)
- Burkina Faso (1)
- Canada (2)
- Chile (1)
- China (2)
- Chinese Taipei (2)
- Colombia (1)
- Cuba (2)
- East Germany (2)
- Finland (2)
- France (2)
- Ghana (1)
- Greece (1)
- Guinea (1)
- Hungary (1)
- Israel (1)
- Jamaica (2)
- Malta (1)
- Mauritius (1)
- Netherlands (2)
- Netherlands Antilles (1)
- Portugal (1)
- Romania (1)
- Saint Lucia (1)
- Senegal (1)
- Sierra Leone (1)
- Soviet Union (2)
- Spain (2)
- Switzerland (1)
- United Kingdom (2)
- United States (2)
- U.S. Virgin Islands (1)
- West Germany (1)
- Yugoslavia (1)
- Zaire (1)
- Zambia (1)
