= Athletics at the 1989 Summer Universiade – Women's 4 × 100 metres relay =

The women's 4 × 100 metres relay event at the 1989 Summer Universiade was held at the Wedaustadion in Duisburg with the final on 30 August 1989.

== Results ==
Rank	Nation	Athletes	Time	Notes
1st place, gold medalist(s)	United States	Michelle Finn, Anita Howard, LaMonda Miller, Esther Jones	42.40	
2nd place, silver medalist(s)	Soviet Union	Nadezhda Roshchupkina, Galina Malchugina, Tatyana Papilina, Natalya Voronova	43.25	
3rd place, bronze medalist(s)	West Germany	Claudia Zaczkiewicz, Ulrike Sarvari, Karin Janke, Silke-Beate Knoll	43.85	
4	Italy	Marinella Signori, Cristiana Picchi, Annarita Balzani, Rossella Tarolo	44.41	
5	Cuba	Eusebia Riquelme, Aliuska López, Julia Duporty, Liliana Allen	44.73	
6	Chinese Taipei	Huang Kuei-ying, Wang Shu-hua, Chen Ya-li, Wang Huei-chen	46.38	
