= Athletics at the 1989 Summer Universiade – Women's 100 metres =

The women's 100 metres event at the 1989 Summer Universiade was held at the Wedaustadion in Duisburg with the final on 25 and 26 August 1989.

== Medalists ==
Gold	Silver	Bronze
Liliana Allen; Cuba	Anita Howard; United States	Natalya Voronova; Soviet Union

== Results ==
=== Heats ===
Wind:
Heat 3: 0.0 m/s

Rank	Heat	Athlete	Nationality	Time	Notes
1	1	Liliana Allen	Cuba	11.26	Q
2	4	Natalya Voronova	Soviet Union	11.30	Q
3	3	Anita Howard	United States	11.33	Q
4	1	Sisko Hanhijoki	Finland	11.40	Q
5	4	Irina Sergeyeva	Soviet Union	11.41	Q
6	2	Ulrike Sarvari	West Germany	11.42	Q
6	3	Lamonda Miller	United States	11.42	Q
8	4	Eusebia Riquelme	Cuba	11.47	Q
9	1	Magali Seguin	France	11.64	Q
10	1	Marinella Signori	Italy	11.64	q
11	2	Sabine Tröger	Austria	11.65	Q
12	1	France Gareau	Canada	11.66	q
13	4	Sølvi Olsen	Norway	11.70	q
14	4	Andrea Hagen	West Germany	11.71	q
15	3	Wang Huei-chen	Chinese Taipei	11.72	Q
16	2	Annarita Balzani	Italy	11.73	Q
17	3	Faith Idehen	Nigeria	11.95	
18	2	Yolanda Díaz	Spain	11.98	
19	1	Stephanie O'Connell	Ireland	11.99	
20	2	Mona Karin Riisnes	Norway	12.08	
21	3	Chen Ya-li	Chinese Taipei	12.29	
22	3	Aminata Konate	Guinea	12.39	
23	1	Marleni Sintya	Indonesia	12.43	
24	4	Lee Yin King	Hong Kong	13.05	
25	4	Hang Do Thu	Vietnam	13.47	

=== Semifinals ===
Wind:
Heat 1: -1.3 m/s, Heat 2: 0.0 m/s

Rank	Heat	Athlete	Nationality	Time	Notes
1	1	Liliana Allen	Cuba	11.25	Q
2	2	Natalya Voronova	Soviet Union	11.36	Q
3	1	Anita Howard	United States	11.48	Q
4	1	Irina Sergeyeva	Soviet Union	11.52	Q
5	1	Ulrike Sarvari	West Germany	11.55	q
6	2	Lamonda Miller	United States	11.56	Q
7	2	Eusebia Riquelme	Cuba	11.62	Q
8	2	Sisko Hanhijoki	Finland	11.63	q
9	1	Marinella Signori	Italy	11.84	
10	1	Wang Huei-chen	Chinese Taipei	11.87	
11	2	Annarita Balzani	Italy	11.89	
12	1	Sabine Tröger	Austria	11.90	
12	2	Magali Seguin	France	11.90	
12	2	France Gareau	Canada	11.90	
15	2	Sølvi Olsen	Norway	11.92	
16	1	Andrea Hagen	West Germany	12.12	

=== Final ===
Wind: -1.4 m/s

Rank	Athlete	Nationality	Time	Notes
1st place, gold medalist(s)	Liliana Allen	Cuba	11.37	
2nd place, silver medalist(s)	Anita Howard	United States	11.47	
3rd place, bronze medalist(s)	Natalya Voronova	Soviet Union	11.48	
4	Ulrike Sarvari	West Germany	11.64	
5	Irina Sergeyeva	Soviet Union	11.64	
6	Lamonda Miller	United States	11.75	
7	Eusebia Riquelme	Cuba	11.75	
8	Sisko Hanhijoki	Finland	11.82	
