= Athletics at the 1991 Pan American Games – Women's 4 × 100 metres relay =

Women's 4 × 100 metres relay at the Pan American Games

The women's 4 × 100 metres relay event at the 1991 Pan American Games was held in Havana, Cuba on 11 August.

== Results ==
Rank	Nation	Athletes	Time	Notes
1st place, gold medalist(s)	Jamaica	Cheryl-Ann Phillips, Merlene Frazer, Beverly McDonald, Dahlia Duhaney	43.79	
2nd place, silver medalist(s)	Cuba	Eusebia Riquelme, Idalmis Bonne, Julia Duporty, Liliana Allen	44.31	
3rd place, bronze medalist(s)	United States	Arnita Myricks, Anita Howard, LaMonda Miller, Chryste Gaines	44.62	
4	Colombia	María Quiñones, Ximena Restrepo, Ángela Mancilla, Norfalia Carabalí	44.68	
5	Canada	Tonia Redhead, Stacey Bowen, Karen Clarke, Faye Roberts	44.86	
