= 1991 IAAF World Indoor Championships – Women's 60 metres =

The women's 60 metres event at the 1991 IAAF World Indoor Championships was held on 8 March.

== Medalists ==
Gold	Silver	Bronze
Irina Sergeyeva; Soviet Union	Merlene Ottey; Jamaica	Liliana Allen; Cuba

== Results ==
=== Heats ===
First 3 of each heat (Q) and next 4 fastest (q) qualified for the semifinals.

Rank	Heat	Name	Nationality	Time	Notes
1	1	Merlene Ottey	Jamaica	7.16	Q
2	2	Irina Sergeyeva	Soviet Union	7.19	Q
3	2	Pauline Davis	Bahamas	7.20	Q, NR
4	1	Gwen Torrence	United States	7.21	Q
4	3	Liliana Allen	Cuba	7.21	Q
6	4	Sisko Hanhijoki	Finland	7.23	Q
7	4	Katrin Krabbe	Germany	7.25	Q
8	3	Nelli Fiere-Cooman	Netherlands	7.26	Q
9	2	Juliet Cuthbert	Jamaica	7.27	Q
9	4	Michelle Finn	United States	7.27	Q
11	4	Beverly Kinch	Great Britain	7.28	q
12	1	Mary Onyali	Nigeria	7.30	Q, =AR
13	3	Stephanie Douglas	Great Britain	7.31	Q
14	2	Lalao Ravaonirina	Madagascar	7.35	q
15	3	Andrea Philipp	Germany	7.38	q
16	4	Wang Huei-chen	Chinese Taipei	7.40	q, NR
17	3	Tian Yumei	China	7.43	NR
18	2	Renata Kubalová	Czechoslovakia	7.43	
19	4	N'Deye Binta Dia	Senegal	7.44	
20	4	Sølvi Olsen	Norway	7.48	
21	1	Cristina Castro	Spain	7.50	
22	1	Monika Špičková	Czechoslovakia	7.50	
23	1	Patricia Foufoué Ziga	Ivory Coast	7.54	
24	3	Karen Clarke	Canada	7.61	
25	3	María del Carmen García Campero	Spain	7.62	
26	2	Trine Rugsveen	Norway	7.64	
27	1	Faye Roberts	Canada	7.65	
28	2	Ana María Luzio	Bolivia	7.88	NR
29	3	Juana Mejía	Dominican Republic	8.12	
	4	Yasmina Azzizi	Algeria	DNS	

=== Semifinals ===
First 4 of each semifinal (Q) qualified directly for the final.

Rank	Heat	Name	Nationality	Time	Notes
1	1	Merlene Ottey	Jamaica	7.08	Q
2	2	Irina Sergeyeva	Soviet Union	7.10	Q
3	1	Gwen Torrence	United States	7.15	Q
4	1	Katrin Krabbe	Germany	7.19	Q
5	1	Sisko Hanhijoki	Finland	7.20	Q, =NR
5	2	Pauline Davis	Bahamas	7.20	Q, =NR
7	2	Michelle Finn	United States	7.23	Q
8	2	Liliana Allen	Cuba	7.24	Q
9	1	Beverly Kinch	Great Britain	7.28	
9	2	Nelli Fiere-Cooman	Netherlands	7.28	
11	2	Juliet Cuthbert	Jamaica	7.29	
12	1	Mary Onyali	Nigeria	7.32	
12	2	Stephanie Douglas	Great Britain	7.32	
14	1	Wang Huei-chen	Chinese Taipei	7.42	
15	1	Lalao Ravaonirina	Madagascar	7.47	
15	2	Andrea Philipp	Germany	7.47	

=== Final ===
Rank	Lane	Name	Nationality	Time	Notes
1st place, gold medalist(s)	4	Irina Sergeyeva	Soviet Union	7.02	CR
2nd place, silver medalist(s)	6	Merlene Ottey	Jamaica	7.08	
3rd place, bronze medalist(s)	7	Liliana Allen	Cuba	7.12	
4	3	Gwen Torrence	United States	7.13	
5	5	Pauline Davis	Bahamas	7.16	NR
6	8	Katrin Krabbe	Germany	7.20	
7	2	Michelle Finn	United States	7.23	
8	1	Sisko Hanhijoki	Finland	7.25	
