= Cristina Castro (sprinter) =

Spanish sprinter (born 1969)

Personal information
- Born: Cristina Castro Salvador; 4 April 1969 (age 56) Bilbao, Spain
- Height: 1.64 m (5 ft 5 in)
- Weight: 48 kg (106 lb)

Sport
- Sport: Track and field
- Event(s): 60 m, 100 m, 200 m

Cristina Castro Salvador (born 4 April 1969, in Bilbao) is a retired Spanish athlete who specialised in sprinting events. She represented her country at the 1992 Summer Olympics as well as one outdoor and one indoor World Championships.

== Competition record ==
Year	Competition	Venue	Position	Event	Notes
Representing Spain
1987	European Junior Championships	Birmingham, United Kingdom	16th (sf)	100 m	12.33
1987	European Junior Championships	Birmingham, United Kingdom	11th (sf)	200 m	24.63
1988	World Junior Championships	Sudbury, Canada	12th (sf)	100 m	11.88
1988	World Junior Championships	Sudbury, Canada	20th (sf)	200 m	24.38 (w)
1988	World Junior Championships	Sudbury, Canada	16th (h)	4 × 100 m relay	46.74
1989	World Cup	Barcelona, Spain	5th	4 × 100m relay	44.62
1990	European Indoor Championships	Glasgow, United Kingdom	10th (sf)	200 m	24.72
1990	European Championships	Split, Yugoslavia	12th (sf)	100 m	11.61
1990	European Championships	Split, Yugoslavia	6th	4 × 100 m relay	44.86
1990	Ibero-American Championships	Manaus, Brazil	1st	200 m	23.63
1990	Ibero-American Championships	Manaus, Brazil	2nd	4 × 100 m relay	45.60
1991	World Indoor Championships	Seville, Spain	21st (h)	60 m	7.50
1991	Mediterranean Games	Athens, Greece	5th	100 m	11.61
1991	Mediterranean Games	Athens, Greece	5th	200 m	23.91
1991	Mediterranean Games	Athens, Greece	–	4 × 100 m relay	DQ
1991	World Championships	Tokyo, Japan	25th (qf)	100 m	11.71
1991	World Championships	Tokyo, Japan	11th (h)	4 × 100 m relay	44.08
1992	Ibero-American Championships	Seville, Spain	4th	200 m	24.38
1992	Ibero-American Championships	Seville, Spain	2nd	4 × 100 m relay	45.53
1992	Olympic Games	Barcelona, Spain	32nd (qf)	100 m	11.79
1994	European Championships	Helsinki, Finland	11th (h)	4 × 100 m relay	45.11

== Personal bests ==
Outdoor

- 100 metres – 11.36 (+1.6 m/s, Salamanca 1992)
- 200 metres – 24.63 (+1.8 m/s, Birmingham 1987)

Indoor

- 60 metres – 7.50 (Seville 1991)
- 200 metres – 23.93 (Glasgow 1990)
