= 1987 European Athletics Junior Championships =

- Level: Under 20
- Events: 41

The 1987 European Athletics Junior Championships was the ninth edition of the biennial athletics competition for European athletes aged under twenty. It was held in Birmingham, United Kingdom between 6 and 9 August.

== Men's results ==
Event	Gold		Silver		Bronze	
100 m	Jamie Henderson (GBR)	10.21	Andrzej Popa (POL)	10.44	Sven Matthes (GDR)	10.47
200 m	Marcus Adam (GBR)	20.95	Andrzej Popa (POL)	21.11	Jamie Henderson (GBR)	21.18
400 m	Peter Crampton (GBR)	46.03	Tomasz Jędrusik (POL)	46.31	Tamás Molnár (HUN)	46.68
800 m	Tomás de Teresa (ESP)	1:49.37	António Abrantes (POR)	1:49.74	Vincent Terrier (FRA)	1:49.85
1500 m	Gennaro Di Napoli (ITA)	3:52.10	Mario Neumann (GDR)	3:52.85	Sergey Melnikov (URS)	3:53.48
5000 m	Simon Mugglestone (GBR)	14:12.83	Giuliano Baccani (ITA)	14:18.39	Luc Krotwaar (NED)	14:20.44
10,000 m	Jens Karrass (GDR)	29:19.38	Haydar Dogan (TUR)	29:23.45	Zoltán Káldy (HUN)	29:26.84
110 m hurdles	Tony Jarrett (GBR)	13.72	Florian Schwarthoff (FRG)	13.81	Paul Gray (GBR)	14.16
400 m hurdles	Niklas Wallenlind (SWE)	50.65	Yvon Delrue (BEL)	50.96	Stéphane Leger (FRA)	51.37
3000 s'chase	Andreas Fischer (FRG)	8:54.83	Vyacheslav Koshelev (URS)	8:55.93	Arto Kuusisto (FIN)	9:02.53
20 km run	Zoltán Holba (HUN)	1:03:22	Valery Chesak (URS)	1:03:39	Marco Di Lieto (ITA)	1:03:57
10,000 m walk	Giovanni De Benedictis (ITA)	39:44.71	Valentí Massana (ESP)	41:26.51	German Nieto (ESP)	41:38.29
4 × 100 m relay	Great Britain (GBR); Ray Burke; Tony Jarrett; Jamie Henderson; Marcus Adam	40.20	West Germany (FRG); Stephan Schütz; Michael Schwab; Oliver Schmidt; Björn Sinnhuber	40.21	East Germany (GDR); Lars Olbrich; Sven Matthes; Torsten Gratz; Heiko Barthel	40.52
4 × 400 m relay	Great Britain (GBR); Richard Hill; Gary Patterson; Gareth Bakewell; Peter Crampton	3:07.89	Poland (POL); Mariusz Rzadzinski; Wojciech Lach; Dariusz Rychter; Tomasz Jędrusik	3:08.72	Soviet Union (URS); Nikolay Gritsay; Vadim Zadoynov; Vladimir Lytkin; Vladimir Chubrovskiy	3:09.55
High jump	Artur Partyka (POL)	2.19 m	Joël Vincent (FRA)	2.15 m	Jarosław Kotewicz (POL) Aleksandr Khabarov (URS)	2.15 m
Pole vault	Roman Barabashov (URS)	5.40 m	Marco Schröder (GDR) István Bagyula (HUN)	5.30 m	Not awarded	
Long jump	Vladimir Ochkan (URS)	8.17 m	Stewart Faulkner (GBR)	7.67 m	Milan Gombala (TCH)	7.63 m
Triple jump	Guido Schumann (GDR)	16.45 m	Roman Sintelyev (URS)	16.33 m	Georges Sainte-Rose (FRA)	16.30 m (w)
Shot put	Pyotr Pogorelyi (URS)	18.48 m	Yevgeniy Palchikov (URS)	18.16 m	Jonny Reinhardt (GDR)	18.16 m
Discus throw	Sergey Pachin (URS)	59.96 m	Vyacheslav Demakov (URS)	56.58 m	Gunnar Minstedt (GDR)	55.84 m
Hammer throw	Jörn Hübner (GDR)	72.10 m	Oleksandr Krykun (URS)	70.92 m	Claus Dethloff (FRG)	69.30 m
Javelin throw	Steve Backley (GBR)	75.14 m	Uladzimir Sasimovich (URS)	73.24 m	Raymond Hecht (GDR)	72.78 m
Decathlon	Patrick Eseimokumoh (GDR)	7614 pts	Roman Frolov (URS)	7389 pts	Barry Walsh (IRL)	7336 pts

== Women's results ==
Event	Gold		Silver		Bronze	
100 m	Diana Dietz (GDR)	11.39	Tamaris Fiebig (GDR)	11.51	Odiah Sidibé (FRA)	11.66
200 m	Diana Dietz (GDR)	23.18	Oksana Kovalyova (URS)	23.51	Tamaris Fiebig (GDR)	23.80
400 m	Uta Rohländer (GDR)	52.46	Stefanie Fabert (GDR)	52.90	Linda Kisabaka (FRG)	53.89
800 m	Birte Bruhns (GDR)	2:00.56	Catalina Gheorghiu (ROM)	2:01.33	Daniele Steinecke (GDR)	2:02.08
1500 m	Snežana Pajkić (YUG)	4:16.09	Simona Staicu (ROM)	4:16.69	Olga Nazarkina (URS)	4:18.61
3000 m	Fernanda Ribeiro (POR)	8:56.33	Doina Calenic (ROM)	9:06.14	Doina Homneac (ROM)	9:11.30
10,000 m	Birgit Jerschabek (GDR)	33:44.37	Larisa Alekseyeva (URS)	33:54.59	Anzhela Shumeyko (URS)	34:43.37
100 m hurdles	Birgit Wolf (FRG)	13.34	Anne Espetvedt (NOR)	13.39	Helena Fernström (SWE)	13.52
400 m hurdles	Silvia Rieger (FRG)	57.44	Ann Maenhout (BEL)	57.47	Irena Dominc (YUG)	58.11
5000 m walk	Oksana Shchastnaya (URS)	21:30.92	Mari Cruz Díaz (ESP)	21:36.92	Kathrin Born (GDR)	22:01.25
4 × 100 m relay	East Germany (GDR); Tamaris Fiebig; Diana Dietz; Katrin Henke; Katrin Krabbe	44.62	Soviet Union (URS); Lyudmila Lapshina; Svetlana Doronina; Natalya Bulatova; Oksana Kovalyova	44.80	France (FRA); Anne Leseur; Cécile Peyre; Elsa Devassoigne; Odiah Sidibé	45.66
4 × 400 m relay	East Germany (GDR); Stefanie Fabert; Daniele Steinecke; Birte Bruhns; Uta Rohländer	3:32.17	West Germany (FRG); Jessica Kawohl; Ruth Scheppan; Silvia Rieger; Linda Kisabaka	3:38.49	Great Britain (GBR); Jillian Reynolds; Tracy Goddard; Nicki Lamb; Jayne Heathcote	3:39.84
High jump	Karen Scholz (GDR)	1.88 m	Alina Astafei (ROM)	1.88 m	Heike Balck (GDR); Yelena Yelesina (URS)	1.84 m
Long jump	Fiona May (GBR)	6.64 m (w)	Mirela Belu (ROM)	6.44 m (w)	Susen Tiedtke (GDR)	6.39 m (w)
Shot put	Ilke Wyludda (GDR)	19.45 m	Ines Wittich (GDR)	19.34 m	Svetlana Krivelyova (URS)	16.64 m
Discus throw	Ilke Wyludda (GDR)	70.58 m	Astrid Kumbernuss (GDR)	63.56 m	Anzhela Baralyuk (URS)	54.64v
Javelin throw (old model)	Anja Reiter (GDR)	64.88 m	Malgorzata Kielczewska (POL)	58.40 m	Karen Forkel (GDR)	57.00 m
Heptathlon	Peggy Beer (GDR)	6068 pts	Yelena Petushkova (URS)	5750 pts	Christiane Scharf (FRG)	5689 pts

== Medal table ==
Rank	Nation	Gold	Silver	Bronze	Total
1	East Germany (GDR)	16	6	11	33
2	Great Britain (GBR)	9	1	3	13
3	Soviet Union (URS)	5	12	8	25
4	West Germany (FRG)	3	3	3	9
5	Italy (ITA)	2	1	1	4
6	Poland (POL)	1	5	1	7
7	Spain (ESP)	1	2	1	4
8	Hungary (HUN)	1	1	2	4
9	Portugal (POR)	1	1	0	2
10	Sweden (SWE)	1	0	1	2
10	Yugoslavia (YUG)	1	0	1	2
12	Romania (ROU)	0	5	1	6
13	Belgium (BEL)	0	2	0	2
14	France (FRA)	0	1	5	6
15	Norway (NOR)	0	1	0	1
15	Turkey (TUR)	0	1	0	1
17	Czechoslovakia (TCH)	0	0	1	1
17	Finland (FIN)	0	0	1	1
17	Ireland (IRL)	0	0	1	1
17	Netherlands (NED)	0	0	1	1
Totals (20 entries)		41	42	42	125
