= 1988 World Junior Championships in Athletics – Men's 800 metres =

The men's 800 metres event at the 1988 World Junior Championships in Athletics was held in Sudbury, Ontario, Canada, at Laurentian University Stadium on 27, 28 and 29 July.

== Medalists ==
Gold	Jonah Birir; Kenya
Silver	Kevin McKay; United Kingdom
Bronze	Melford Homela; Zimbabwe

== Results ==
=== Final ===
29 July

Rank	Name	Nationality	Time	Notes
1st place, gold medalist(s)	Jonah Birir	Kenya	1:50.03	
2nd place, silver medalist(s)	Kevin McKay	United Kingdom	1:50.79	
3rd place, bronze medalist(s)	Melford Homela	Zimbabwe	1:51.34	
4	Predrag Melnjak	Yugoslavia	1:52.07	
5	Giuseppe D'Urso	Italy	1:53.34	
6	Mariusz Hawrylak	Poland	1:55.14	
7	Joachim Dehmel	West Germany	1:55.68	
8	Oleg Yefimov	Soviet Union	1:55.74	

=== Semifinals ===
28 July

==== Semifinal 1 ====
Rank	Name	Nationality	Time	Notes
1	Giuseppe D'Urso	Italy	1:52.16	Q
2	Joachim Dehmel	West Germany	1:52.23	Q
3	Pavel Hujer	Czechoslovakia	1:52.27	
4	Neil Chomos	Canada	1:53.38	
5	Isaac Viciosa	Spain	1:53.43	
6	Stéphane Bonnaud	France	1:54.86	
7	Simon Still	Australia	1:55.90	
8	Mohamed Shawki Abdullah	Qatar	1:56.26	

==== Semifinal 2 ====
Rank	Name	Nationality	Time	Notes
1	Jonah Birir	Kenya	1:51.32	Q
2	Melford Homela	Zimbabwe	1:51.48	Q
3	Paul Burgess	United Kingdom	1:51.60	
4	Luis Javier González	Spain	1:51.98	
5	Philippe Appoline	France	1:52.00	
6	Mikhail Tsyoma	Soviet Union	1:52.20	
7	D'Juan Strozier	United States	1:53.13	
8	Andrea Benvenuti	Italy	1:57.48	

==== Semifinal 3 ====
Rank	Name	Nationality	Time	Notes
1	Kevin McKay	United Kingdom	1:49.22	Q
2	Predrag Melnjak	Yugoslavia	1:49.40	Q
3	Mariusz Hawrylak	Poland	1:49.60	q
4	Oleg Yefimov	Soviet Union	1:49.86	q
5	Luis Cadogan	Cuba	1:49.99	
6	Sergey Mitov	Bulgaria	1:50.55	
7	Colin Mathieson	Canada	1:50.87	
8	Benito Mpwewe	Tanzania	18:30.30	

=== Heats ===
27 July

==== Heat 1 ====
Rank	Name	Nationality	Time	Notes
1	Giuseppe D'Urso	Italy	1:51.12	Q
2	Luis Cadogan	Cuba	1:51.32	Q
3	Luis Javier González	Spain	1:51.77	Q
4	Philippe Appoline	France	1:52.18	q
5	Paulo Estiveira	Portugal	1:53.81	
6	Felizardo Sardenia	Philippines	1:54.13	
7	Yoshikazu Tachi	Japan	1:55.04	

==== Heat 2 ====
Rank	Name	Nationality	Time	Notes
1	Joachim Dehmel	West Germany	1:50.21	Q
2	Paul Burgess	United Kingdom	1:50.37	Q
3	Stéphane Bonnaud	France	1:51.83	Q
4	Momodou Bello N'Jie	Gambia	1:58.07	
5	Peter Merchant	Antigua and Barbuda	2:07.76	
	Fransua Woldemarian	Ethiopia	DQ	

==== Heat 3 ====
Rank	Name	Nationality	Time	Notes
1	Kevin McKay	United Kingdom	1:49.86	Q
2	Melford Homela	Zimbabwe	1:49.93	Q
3	Mohamed Shawki Abdullah	Qatar	1:50.02	Q
4	Oleg Yefimov	Soviet Union	1:50.33	q
5	Odd Magne Øgried	Norway	1:54.64	
	Lyle Tenfingers	American Samoa	DQ	
	Oliver Münzer	Austria	DNF	

==== Heat 4 ====
Rank	Name	Nationality	Time	Notes
1	Jonah Birir	Kenya	1:50.56	Q
2	Mikhail Tsyoma	Soviet Union	1:51.13	Q
3	Andrea Benvenuti	Italy	1:51.60	Q
4	Simon Still	Australia	1:51.86	q
5	Bernard Henry	Saint Lucia	1:56.47	
	Lawrence Lenin	United States	DQ	

==== Heat 5 ====
Rank	Name	Nationality	Time	Notes
1	Mariusz Hawrylak	Poland	1:50.41	Q
2	Isaac Viciosa	Spain	1:50.76	Q
3	Benito Mpwewe	Tanzania	1:51.15	Q
4	Sergey Mitov	Bulgaria	1:51.83	q
5	Neil Chomos	Canada	1:52.39	q
	Wilson Kipketer	Kenya	DQ	

==== Heat 6 ====
Rank	Name	Nationality	Time	Notes
1	Pavel Hujer	Czechoslovakia	1:52.48	Q
2	Predrag Melnjak	Yugoslavia	1:52.88	Q
3	D'Juan Strozier	United States	1:52.95	Q
4	Colin Mathieson	Canada	1:52.99	q
5	Kenneth Nielsen	Norway	1:53.46	
6	Greg Whitfield	Australia	1:54.03	
7	Chern Srichudanu	Thailand	1:54.57	

== Participation ==
According to an unofficial count, 39 athletes from 29 countries participated in the event.

- American Samoa (1)
- Antigua and Barbuda (1)
- Australia (2)
- Austria (1)
- Bulgaria (1)
- Canada (2)
- Cuba (1)
- Czechoslovakia (1)
- Ethiopia (1)
- France (2)
- Gambia (1)
- Italy (2)
- Japan (1)
- Kenya (2)
- Norway (2)
- Philippines (1)
- Poland (1)
- Portugal (1)
- Qatar (1)
- Saint Lucia (1)
- Soviet Union (2)
- Spain (2)
- Tanzania (1)
- Thailand (1)
- United Kingdom (2)
- United States (2)
- West Germany (1)
- Yugoslavia (1)
- Zimbabwe (1)
