= Boay Akonay =

Tanzanian long-distance runner (1970–2013)

Boay Akonay (3 January 1970 – 29 June 2013) was a Tanzanian long-distance runner who won the bronze medal at the 1992 World Half Marathon Championships.

== Achievements ==
Year	Competition	Venue	Position	Event	Notes
Representing Tanzania
1988	World Junior Championships	Sudbury, Canada	5th	5000m	14:15.70
1988	World Junior Championships	Sudbury, Canada	6th	10,000m	29:28.46
1988	World Junior Championships	Sudbury, Canada	7th	20 km road run	1:02:33
1992	World Half Marathon Championships	Newcastle, England	3rd	Half Marathon	1:00:45
1993	World Championships	Stuttgart, Germany	13th	10.000 m	29:15.13
1993	Palermo City Marathon	Palermo, Italy	1st	Marathon	2:13:52
1994	Boston Marathon	Boston, United States	6th	Marathon	2:08:35
1994	Fukuoka Marathon	Fukuoka, Japan	1st	Marathon	2:09:45
1995	World Championships	Gothenburg, Sweden	—	Marathon	DNF
