= 1988 World Junior Championships in Athletics – Men's 5000 metres =

The men's 5000 metres event at the 1988 World Junior Championships in Athletics was held in Sudbury, Ontario, Canada, at Laurentian University Stadium on 28 and 30 July.

== Medalists ==
| Gold | Henry Kirui; Kenya |
| Silver | Mohamed Choumassi; Morocco |
| Bronze | Addis Abebe; Ethiopia |

== Results ==
=== Final ===
30 July

| Rank | Name | Nationality | Time | Notes |
|---|---|---|---|---|
| 1st place, gold medalist(s) | Henry Kirui | Kenya | 13:54.29 | |
| 2nd place, silver medalist(s) | Mohamed Choumassi | Morocco | 13:54.36 | |
| 3rd place, bronze medalist(s) | Addis Abebe | Ethiopia | 13:58.08 | |
| 4 | Norbert Kilimiali | Tanzania | 13:59.35 | |
| 5 | Boay Akonay | Tanzania | 14:15.70 | |
| 6 | Morgan Tollofsén | Sweden | 14:18.95 | |
| 7 | Mariano Campal | Spain | 14:19.75 | |
| 8 | Demeke Bekele | Ethiopia | 14:20.12 | |
| 9 | Paul Bitok | Kenya | 14:25.24 | |
| 10 | Viktor Karpenko | Soviet Union | 14:25.78 | |
| 11 | Juan Abad | Spain | 14:37.02 | |
| 12 | Neil Panchen | United Kingdom | 14:39.77 | |
| 13 | Cândido Maia | Portugal | 14:44.83 | |
| 14 | Ryuji Takei | Japan | 14:53.59 | |
| 15 | Jon Dennis | United Kingdom | 15:12.78 | |

=== Heats ===
28 July

==== Heat 1 ====
| Rank | Name | Nationality | Time | Notes |
|---|---|---|---|---|
| 1 | Addis Abebe | Ethiopia | 14:00.54 | Q |
| 2 | Norbert Kilimiali | Tanzania | 14:00.87 | Q |
| 3 | Mariano Campal | Spain | 14:22.58 | Q |
| 4 | Viktor Karpenko | Soviet Union | 14:23.55 | Q |
| 5 | Jon Dennis | United Kingdom | 14:25.89 | Q |
| 6 | Paul Bitok | Kenya | 14:27.03 | q |
| 7 | Jun Hiratsuka | Japan | 14:28.53 | |
| 8 | Abderrahim Cherkaoui | Morocco | 14:32.00 | |
| 9 | Rui Vieira | Portugal | 14:42.49 | |
| 10 | Franklin Tenorio | Ecuador | 14:42.67 | |
| 11 | Reggie Williams | United States | 14:48.16 | |
| 12 | Julian Paynter | Australia | 15:01.34 | |
| 13 | Mohamed Ahmed Hussein | Somalia | 15:12.79 | |
| 14 | Robin Cianca | Panama | 15:32.29 | |

==== Heat 2 ====
| Rank | Name | Nationality | Time | Notes |
|---|---|---|---|---|
| 1 | Mohamed Choumassi | Morocco | 14:05.17 | Q |
| 2 | Henry Kirui | Kenya | 14:08.45 | Q |
| 3 | Demeke Bekele | Ethiopia | 14:08.84 | Q |
| 4 | Boay Akonay | Tanzania | 14:13.85 | Q |
| 5 | Morgan Tollofsén | Sweden | 14:14.60 | Q |
| 6 | Ryuji Takei | Japan | 14:14.88 | q |
| 7 | Juan Abad | Spain | 14:25.73 | q |
| 8 | Neil Panchen | United Kingdom | 14:26.79 | q |
| 9 | Cândido Maia | Portugal | 14:27.79 | q |
| 10 | Mickael Dufermont | France | 14:39.12 | |
| 11 | Lloyd Letkeman | Canada | 14:54.33 | |
| 12 | Vladimir Yordanov | Bulgaria | 15:00.79 | |
| 13 | Daniel Middleman | United States | 15:05.56 | |
| 14 | Valdenor dos Santos | Brazil | 15:10.01 | |
| 15 | Patrick Chikwatu | Malawi | 15:16.88 | |
| 16 | Dean Livingston | Australia | 16:11.24 | |
| | Martin Forde | Barbados | DNF | |

== Participation ==
According to an unofficial count, 31 athletes from 21 countries participated in the event.

- Australia (2)
- Barbados (1)
- Brazil (1)
- Bulgaria (1)
- Canada (1)
- Ecuador (1)
- Ethiopia (2)
- France (1)
- Japan (2)
- Kenya (2)
- Malawi (1)
- Morocco (2)
- Panama (1)
- Portugal (2)
- Somalia (1)
- Soviet Union (1)
- Spain (2)
- Sweden (1)
- Tanzania (2)
- United Kingdom (2)
- United States (2)
