= 1991 World Championships in Athletics – Women's 100 metres =

These are the official results of the Women's 100 metres event at the 1991 IAAF World Championships in Tokyo, Japan. There were a total number of 59 participating athletes, with eight qualifying heats and the final held on August 27, 1991.

== Medalists ==
Gold	Katrin Krabbe; Germany (GER)
Silver	Gwen Torrence; United States (USA)
Bronze	Merlene Ottey; Jamaica (JAM)

== Schedule ==
- All times are Japan Standard Time (UTC+9)

Heats
26.08.1991 – 10:45h
Quarterfinals
26.08.1991 – 16:20h
Semifinals
27.08.1991 – 16:05h
Final
27.08.1991 – 18:20h

== Final ==
RANK	FINAL	TIME
	Katrin Krabbe (GER)	10.99
	Gwen Torrence (USA)	11.03
	Merlene Ottey (JAM)	11.06
4.	Irina Privalova (URS)	11.16
5.	Evelyn Ashford (USA)	11.30
6.	Juliet Cuthbert (JAM)	11.33
7.	Mary Onyali (NGR)	11.39
8.	Carlette Guidry (USA)	11.52

== Semifinals ==
- Held on August 27, 1991.

RANK	HEAT 1	TIME
1.	Katrin Krabbe (GER)	10.94
2.	Evelyn Ashford (USA)	11.08
3.	Juliet Cuthbert (JAM)	11.13
4.	Carlette Guidry (USA)	11.16
5.	Kerry Johnson (AUS)	11.38
6.	Irina Slyusar (URS)	11.42
7.	Liliana Allen (CUB)	11.53
8.	Beatrice Utondu (NGR)	11.58

RANK	HEAT 2	TIME
1.	Merlene Ottey (JAM)	10.78
2.	Gwen Torrence (USA)	10.85
3.	Irina Privalova (URS)	10.99
4.	Mary Onyali (NGR)	11.10
5.	Pauline Davis (BAH)	11.19
6.	Natalya Kovtun (URS)	11.37
7.	Beverly McDonald (JAM)	11.46
8.	Paraskevi Patoulidou (GRE)	11.51

== Quarterfinals ==
- Held on August 26, 1991.

RANK	HEAT 1	TIME
1.	Katrin Krabbe (GER)	10.91
2.	Carlette Guidry (USA)	11.21
3.	Irina Slyusar (URS)	11.30
4.	Paraskevi Patoulidou (GRE)	11.47
5.	Paula Thomas (GBR)	11.51
6.	Yumei Tian (CHN)	11.52
7.	Claudete Alves Pina (BRA)	11.81
8.	Lalao Ravaonirina (MAD)	11.81

RANK	HEAT 2	TIME
1.	Evelyn Ashford (USA)	11.09
2.	Juliet Cuthbert (JAM)	11.12
3.	Mary Onyali (NGR)	11.20
4.	Natalya Kovtun (URS)	11.43
5.	Laurence Bily (FRA)	11.45
6.	Stephanie Douglas (GBR)	11.58
7.	Sabine Richter (GER)	11.66
8.	Huei-Chen Wang (TPE)	11.79

RANK	HEAT 3	TIME
1.	Irina Privalova (URS)	11.22
2.	Pauline Davis (BAH)	11.30
3.	Beatrice Utondu (NGR)	11.40
4.	Beverly McDonald (JAM)	11.41
5.	Sisko Hanhijoki (FIN)	11.52
6.	Rossella Tarolo (ITA)	11.75
7.	Andrea Philipp (GER)	11.80
8.	Govindasamy Shanti (MAS)	11.89

RANK	HEAT 4	TIME
1.	Merlene Ottey (JAM)	10.89
2.	Gwen Torrence (USA)	10.99
3.	Kerry Johnson (AUS)	11.27
4.	Liliana Allen (CUB)	11.40
5.	Beverly Kinch (GBR)	11.45
6.	Rufina Ubah (NGR)	11.54
7.	Cristina Castro (ESP)	11.71
8.	Michelle Seymour (NZL)	11.87

== Qualifying heats ==
- Held on August 26, 1991.

RANK	HEAT 1	TIME
1.	Carlette Guidry (USA)	11.21
2.	Irina Slyusar (URS)	11.32
3.	Beverly Kinch (GBR)	11.50
4.	Claudete Alves Pina (BRA)	11.71
5.	Jatamsuren Otgonchineg (MGL)	12.26
6.	Jane Thondojee (MRI)	12.36
7.	Tili Fata (SAM)	13.31

RANK	HEAT 2	TIME
1.	Irina Privalova (URS)	11.14
2.	Sisko Hanhijoki (FIN)	11.24
3.	Kerry Johnson (AUS)	11.26
4.	Cristina Castro (ESP)	11.55
5.	Rosanna Brown (AIA)	12.04
6.	Jabou Jawo (GAM)	12.42
7.	Faouzia Djaffar (COM)	14.69

RANK	HEAT 3	TIME
1.	Evelyn Ashford (USA)	11.16
2.	Juliet Cuthbert (JAM)	11.22
3.	Tian Yumei (CHN)	11.55
4.	Sabine Richter (GER)	11.64
5.	Mariama Ouiminga (BUR)	12.26
6.	Joy-Ann Eli (BAR)	12.42
7.	Sherlette Barrow (BIZ)	12.66
8.	Mpoka Mokosi (ZAI)	12.99

RANK	HEAT 4	TIME
1.	Beverly McDonald (JAM)	11.45
2.	Laurence Bily (FRA)	11.51
3.	Andrea Philipp (GER)	11.72
4.	Huei-Chen Wang (TPE)	11.77
5.	My Linh Truong Hoang (VIE)	12.02
6.	Gisele Ongollo (GAB)	12.32
7.	Denise Ouabangui (CAF)	12.69
8.	Erin Tierney (COK)	13.45

RANK	HEAT 5	TIME
1.	Katrin Krabbe (GER)	11.23
2.	Beatrice Utondu (NGR)	11.51
3.	Stephanie Douglas (GBR)	11.66
4.	Govindasamy Shanti (MAS)	11.80
5.	Gailey Dube (ZIM)	12.25
6.	Deirdre Caruana (MLT)	12.71
7.	Lusia Puleanga (TON)	13.21

RANK	HEAT 6	TIME
1.	Mary Onyali (NGR)	11.27
2.	Pauline Davis (BAH)	11.32
3.	Paula Thomas (GBR)	11.54
4.	Lalao Ravaonirina (MAD)	11.74
5.	Aminata Konate (GUI)	12.19
6.	Feroza Khatton (BAN)	12.67
7.	Laure Kuetey (BEN)	13.01
8.	Trudy Duburiya (NRU)	14.34

RANK	HEAT 7	TIME
1.	Merlene Ottey (JAM)	11.06
2.	Paraskevi Patoulidou (GRE)	11.42
3.	Natalya Kovtun (URS)	11.44
4.	Rossella Tarolo (ITA)	11.64
5.	Michelle Seymour (NZL)	11.77
6.	Fornie Conteh (SLE)	13.72
	Miss Sabra (AFG)	DNS

RANK	HEAT 8	TIME
1.	Gwen Torrence (USA)	11.51
2.	Liliana Allen (CUB)	11.59
3.	Rufina Ubah (NGR)	11.72
4.	Karen Clarke (CAN)	11.98
5.	Rita Alcazar (PAN)	12.49
6.	Fathimath Fezleen (MDV)	14.08
7.	Tehani Kirby (MNP)	15.12

== See also ==
- 1988 Women's Olympic 100 metres (Seoul)
- 1990 Women's European Championships 100 metres (Split)
- 1992 Women's Olympic 100 metres (Barcelona)
- 1993 Women's World Championships 100 metres (Stuttgart)
