= Athletics at the 1991 Pan American Games – Women's 200 metres =

Women's 200 metres at the Pan American Games

The women's 200 metres event at the 1991 Pan American Games was held in Havana, Cuba with the final on 7 and 8 August.

== Medalists ==
Gold	Silver	Bronze
Liliana Allen; Cuba	Ximena Restrepo; Colombia	Merlene Frazer; Jamaica

== Results ==
=== Heats ===
Wind:
Heat 1: +2.2 m/s, Heat 2: +2.6 m/s

Rank	Heat	Name	Nationality	Time	Notes
1	2	Liliana Allen	Cuba	23.19	Q
2	1	Ximena Restrepo	Colombia	23.41	Q
3	2	Dahlia Duhaney	Jamaica	23.51	Q
4	2	Karen Clarke	Canada	23.79	Q
5	1	Idalmis Bonne	Cuba	23.85	Q
6	2	Claudete Alves Pina	Brazil	23.88	q
7	1	Merlene Frazer	Jamaica	23.95	Q
8	2	Shantel Ransom	United States	23.99	q
9	1	Stacey Bowen	Canada	24.00	
10	1	Tamela Saldana	United States	24.19	
11	2	Claudia Acerenza	Uruguay	24.61	
12	2	Zoila Stewart	Costa Rica	24.85	
13	1	Estela Abel	Uruguay	25.18	
14	1	Jacqueline Staine	Belize	27.13	
15	2	Marinett Flowers	Belize	27.50	

=== Final ===
Wind: -1.3 m/s

Rank	Name	Nationality	Time	Notes
1st place, gold medalist(s)	Liliana Allen	Cuba	23.11	
2nd place, silver medalist(s)	Ximena Restrepo	Colombia	23.16	
3rd place, bronze medalist(s)	Merlene Frazer	Jamaica	23.48	
4	Idalmis Bonne	Cuba	23.64	
5	Karen Clarke	Canada	23.71	
6	Dahlia Duhaney	Jamaica	23.77	
7	Shantel Ransom	United States	23.97	
8	Claudete Alves Pina	Brazil	24.02	
