= Sonia Vigati =

Italian sprinter (born 1970)

Personal information
- Nationality: Italian
- Born: June 30, 1970 (age 56) Camposampiero, Italy
- Height: 1.57 m (5 ft 2 in)
- Weight: 50 kg (110 lb)

Sport
- Country: Italy
- Sport: Athletics
- Event: Sprint
- Club: Assindustria Sport Padova; SNAM Gas Metano

Achievements and titles
- Personal bests: 100 m: 11.42 (1989); 60 m indoor: 7.35 (1994)

Sonia Vigati (born 30 June 1970, in Camposampiero) is a former Italian sprinter.

== Biography ==
Sonia Vigati has 14 caps in national team from 1988 to 1994.

== Achievements ==
Year	Competition	Venue	Position	Event	Notes
Representing Italy
1988	World Junior Championships	Sudbury, Canada	20th (sf)	100m	12.04 (wind: -0.9 m/s)
1990	European Indoor Championships	Glasgow, United Kingdom	SF	60 metres	7.41
1994	European Indoor Championships	Paris, France	H	60 metres	7.40

== National titles ==
Sonia Vigati has won three times the individual national championship.

- 1 win on 100 metres (1989)
- 2 wins on 60 metres indoor (1989, 1900)

== See also ==
- Italian all-time top lists - 100 metres
