= Athletics at the 1993 Summer Universiade – Women's 100 metres =

The women's 100 metres event at the 1993 Summer Universiade was held at the UB Stadium in Buffalo, United States on 14 and 15 July 1993.

== Medalists ==
Gold	Silver	Bronze
Dahlia Duhaney; Jamaica	Liliana Allen; Cuba	Beatrice Utondu; Nigeria

== Results ==
=== Heats ===
Rank	Heat	Athlete	Nationality	Time	Notes
1	1	Dahlia Duhaney	Jamaica	11.46	Q
2	3	Liliana Allen	Cuba	11.50	Q
3	3	Cheryl Taplin	United States	11.56	Q
4	2	Wang Huei-chen	Chinese Taipei	11.57	Q
5	2	Georgette Nkoma	Cameroon	11.58	Q
6	4	Beatrice Utondu	Nigeria	11.60	Q
7	3	Marcia Richardson	Great Britain	11.63	Q
8	3	Irina Pukha	Ukraine	11.69	Q
8	5	Christy Opara	Nigeria	11.69	Q
10	2	Hanitriniaina Rakotondrabé	Madagascar	11.71	Q
11	1	Zenia Ayrton	India	11.80	Q
11	4	Chryste Gaines	United States	11.80	Q
13	2	Stacey Bowen	Canada	11.88	Q
14	1	Dionne Wright	Canada	11.91	Q
15	4	Lou Ann Williams	Trinidad and Tobago	11.95	Q
16	3	Gillian Russell	Jamaica	11.98	q
17	5	Chandra Sturrup	Bahamas	11.99	Q
18	3	Chantal Brunner	New Zealand	12.01	q
19	3	Mireia Ruiz	Spain	12.10	q
20	5	Katerina Koffa	Greece	12.19	Q
21	2	Natalya Gridasova	Kazakhstan	12.20	q
21	4	Zlatka Georgieva	Bulgaria	12.20	Q
21	5	Giada Gallina	Italy	12.20	Q
24	1	Sandra Petersen	South Africa	12.37	Q
24	3	Harrys Raysa	Dominican Republic	12.37	
26	5	Melanie Neef	Great Britain	12.39	
27	4	Patricia Morales	Spain	12.40	
28	4	Kao Yu-chuan	Chinese Taipei	12.52	
29	1	Christophine Harases	Namibia	12.59	
30	1	Feroza Khatoon	Bangladesh	12.68	
31	5	Leonor Ramos	Puerto Rico	12.84	
32	1	Sonali Nanayakkara	Sri Lanka	13.08	
33	2	Amrei Baumgarten	Guatemala	13.07	
34	4	Litea Bari	Fiji	13.12	
35	2	Chi Phung Thi Kim	Vietnam	13.22	
36	2	Bambi Badibanga	Zaire	14.65	
	5	Cristina Regalo	Portugal	DNF	

=== Quarterfinals ===
Wind:
Heat 1: +0.8 m/s, Heat 2: ? m/s, Heat 3: ? m/s

Rank	Heat	Athlete	Nationality	Time	Notes
1	1	Chryste Gaines	United States	11.30	Q
2	2	Dahlia Duhaney	Jamaica	11.36	Q
3	1	Christy Opara	Nigeria	11.38	Q
4	3	Beatrice Utondu	Nigeria	11.43	Q
5	1	Marcia Richardson	Great Britain	11.45	Q
6	1	Liliana Allen	Cuba	11.50	Q
7	3	Wang Huei-chen	Chinese Taipei	11.51	Q
8	2	Cheryl Taplin	United States	11.52	Q
9	2	Georgette Nkoma	Cameroon	11.60	Q
10	3	Irina Pukha	Ukraine	11.65	Q
11	2	Hanitriniaina Rakotondrabé	Madagascar	11.74	Q
12	3	Chandra Sturrup	Bahamas	11.75	Q
13	2	Giada Gallina	Italy	11.77	Q
14	2	Zlatka Georgieva	Bulgaria	11.79	q
15	1	Stacey Bowen	Canada	11.81	Q
16	3	Katerina Koffa	Greece	11.89	Q
17	1	Lou Ann Williams	Trinidad and Tobago	11.93	
18	3	Zenia Ayrton	India	11.99	
19	2	Dionne Wright	Canada	12.03	
20	3	Chantal Brunner	New Zealand	12.14	
21	1	Mireia Ruiz	Spain	12.17	
22	1	Sandra Petersen	South Africa	12.60	
	?	Gillian Russell	Jamaica	?	
	?	Natalya Gridasova	Kazakhstan	?	

=== Semifinals ===
Wind: Heat 1: +2.0 m/s, Heat 2: wind assisted

Rank	Heat	Athlete	Nationality	Time	Notes
1	1	Dahlia Duhaney	Jamaica	11.22	Q
2	1	Liliana Allen	Cuba	11.23	Q
3	1	Beatrice Utondu	Nigeria	11.26	Q
4	2	Wang Huei-chen	Chinese Taipei	11.41	Q
5	2	Christy Opara	Nigeria	11.41	Q
6	1	Marcia Richardson	Great Britain	11.45	Q
7	1	Cheryl Taplin	United States	11.46	
8	2	Georgette Nkoma	Cameroon	11.51	Q
9	2	Chryste Gaines	United States	11.51	Q
10	2	Irina Pukha	Ukraine	11.62	
11	1	Hanitriniaina Rakotondrabé	Madagascar	11.63	
12	2	Giada Gallina	Italy	11.71	
13	1	Zlatka Georgieva	Bulgaria	11.72	
14	1	Stacey Bowen	Canada	11.84	
15	2	Chandra Sturrup	Bahamas	11.87	
16	2	Katerina Koffa	Greece	11.91	

=== Final ===
Wind: -2.1 m/s

Rank	Lane	Athlete	Nationality	Time	Notes
1st place, gold medalist(s)	6	Dahlia Duhaney	Jamaica	11.56	
2nd place, silver medalist(s)	3	Liliana Allen	Cuba	11.57	
3rd place, bronze medalist(s)	5	Beatrice Utondu	Nigeria	11.59	
4	1	Christy Opara	Nigeria	11.63	
5	2	Chryste Gaines	United States	11.65	
6	7	Marcia Richardson	Great Britain	11.69	
7	4	Wang Huei-chen	Chinese Taipei	11.80	
8	8	Georgette Nkoma	Cameroon	11.85	
