= 1988 World Junior Championships in Athletics – Men's 10,000 metres =

The men's 10,000 metres event at the 1988 World Junior Championships in Athletics was held in Sudbury, Ontario, Canada, at Laurentian University Stadium on 27 July.

== Medalists ==
Gold	Addis Abebe; Ethiopia
Silver	Bedilu Kibret; Ethiopia
Bronze	James Songok; Kenya

== Results ==
=== Final ===
27 July

Rank	Name	Nationality	Time	Notes
1st place, gold medalist(s)	Addis Abebe	Ethiopia	28:42.13	
2nd place, silver medalist(s)	Bedilu Kibret	Ethiopia	28:48.53	
3rd place, bronze medalist(s)	James Songok	Kenya	28:50.42	
4	Norbert Kilimiali	Tanzania	28:51.00	
5	Zoltán Káldy	Hungary	29:08.36	
6	Boay Akonay	Tanzania	29:28.46	
7	Mohamed Choumassi	Morocco	29:32.50	
8	Stephenson Nyamau	Kenya	29:46.81	
9	James Loveless	United States	30:14.19	
10	Michael Lavalle	United States	30:21.78	
11	Viktor Karpenko	Soviet Union	30:21.96	
12	Jun Hiratsuka	Japan	30:26.79	
13	Carsten Arndt	West Germany	30:40.08	
14	Franklin Tenorio	Ecuador	30:44.90	
15	Masaki Yamamoto	Japan	30:57.53	
16	Hussein Hassan Adani	Somalia	31:04.25	
17	David Pujolar	Spain	31:24.69	
18	Francisco González	Mexico	31:34.27	
19	Vitor Barbosa	Portugal	31:41.11	
20	Jürg Albert	East Germany	31:55.50	
21	Ross Wilson	New Zealand	32:56.44	
	Baltazar Sousa	Portugal	DNF	
	Ventislav Chavdarov	Bulgaria	DNF	
	Vanderlei de Lima	Brazil	DNF	
	Valdenor dos Santos	Brazil	DNF	
	Alejandro Villanueva	Mexico	DNF	

== Participation ==
According to an unofficial count, 26 athletes from 18 countries participated in the event.

- Brazil (2)
- Bulgaria (1)
- East Germany (1)
- Ecuador (1)
- Ethiopia (2)
- Hungary (1)
- Japan (2)
- Kenya (2)
- Mexico (2)
- Morocco (1)
- New Zealand (1)
- Portugal (2)
- Somalia (1)
- Soviet Union (1)
- Spain (1)
- Tanzania (2)
- United States (2)
- West Germany (1)
