= Ximena Restrepo =

Colombian nationalized Chilean sprinter

Personal information
- Full name: Ximena Restrepo Gaviria
- Born: 10 March 1969 (age 57) Medellín, Colombia
- Education: University of Nebraska–Lincoln
- Height: 1.75 m (5 ft 9 in)
- Weight: 58 kg (128 lb)

Sport
- Country: Colombia; Chile
- Sport: Athletics
- Events: 100 metres; 200 metres; 400 metres; 400 metres hurdles; 4×100 metres; 4×400 metres
- College team: Nebraska Cornhuskers

Achievements and titles
- Olympic finals: 1992 Summer Olympics
Medal record
Representing Colombia
Women's athletics
Olympic Games
Bronze medal – third place	1992 Barcelona	400 m
Pan American Games
Silver medal – second place	1991 Havana	200 m
Silver medal – second place	1991 Havana	400 m
South American Games
Gold medal – first place	1994 Valencia	400 m
Gold medal – first place	1994 Valencia	400 m hurdles
Gold medal – first place	1994 Valencia	4×100 m relay
Bolivarian Games
Gold medal – first place	1985 Cuenca	200 m
Gold medal – first place	1985 Cuenca	4×100 m relay
Gold medal – first place	1985 Cuenca	4×400 m relay

Ximena Restrepo Gaviria (born March 10, 1969, in Medellín) is a former Colombian nationalized Chilean sprinter who specialised in the 400 metres.

With the time of 49.64 seconds she won a bronze medal in 400 metres at the 1992 Olympic Games, Colombia's first athletics medal. This result is still a South American record, as is the case with her 200 metres time of 22.92 seconds, which she achieved in 1991. At the 1991 Pan American Games she won silver medals in 200 and 400 metres.

Restrepo is married to Chilean shot putter Gert Weil. She attended the University of Nebraska–Lincoln, where she won the 1991 NCAA Championship in the 400 metres. Martina Weil, daughter of Ximena and Gert, is a track and field athlete at the University of Tennessee after winning the 400 meters in the South American U23 championships and setting a Chilean national record in the event, and recently won a gold medal in the 400 meters in the 2023 Panamerican games.

Living now in Chile, she is the first female elected vice-president of the World Athletics, in Doha on 25 September 2019.

== International competitions ==
Year	Competition	Venue	Position	Event	Notes
Representing Colombia
1985	Bolivarian Games	Cuenca, Ecuador	1st	200 m	24.93 A
1985	Bolivarian Games	Cuenca, Ecuador	1st	4 × 100 m relay	47.89 A
1985	Bolivarian Games	Cuenca, Ecuador	1st	4 × 400 m relay	3:58.22 A
1986	Pan American Junior Championships	Winter Park, United States	4th	100 m	11.98 (w)
1986	Pan American Junior Championships	Winter Park, United States	3rd	200 m	24.54
1986	World Junior Championships	Athens, Greece	20th (sf)	100 m	12.09 w (+2.5 m/s)
1986	World Junior Championships	Athens, Greece	16th (sf)	200 m	24.42 (-0.8 m/s)
1986	South American Junior Championships	Quito, Ecuador	2nd	100 m	12.10
1986	South American Junior Championships	Quito, Ecuador	1st	200 m	24.08
1986	Ibero-American Championships	Havana, Cuba	1st	200 m	23.76 w (+2.1 m/s)
1987	South American Junior Championships	Santiago, Chile	1st	100 m	11.69
1987	South American Junior Championships	Santiago, Chile	1st	200 m	23.72
1987	South American Championships	São Paulo, Brazil	2nd	100 m	11.77
1987	South American Championships	São Paulo, Brazil	1st	200 m	23.49
1988	South American Junior Championships	Cubatão, Brazil	2nd	200 m	24.38
1988	Ibero-American Championships	Mexico City, Mexico	4th	200 m	23.46 (0.0 m/s) A
1988	World Junior Championships	Sudbury, Canada	11th (sf)	100 m	11.83 (+0.5 m/s)
1988	World Junior Championships	Sudbury, Canada	10th (sf)	200 m	23.90 w (+2.1 m/s)
1988	World Junior Championships	Sudbury, Canada	1st (h)	400 m	53.48
1988	Olympic Games	Seoul, South Korea	34th (h)	200 m	24.00
1988	Olympic Games	Seoul, South Korea	16th (h)	4 × 100 m relay	45.46^{1}
1988	Olympic Games	Seoul, South Korea	–	4 × 400 m relay	DQ
1989	South American Championships	Medellín, Colombia	2nd	100 m	11.4
1990	Central American and Caribbean Games	Mexico City, Mexico	2nd	4 × 100 m relay	45.29
1991	South American Championships	Manaus, Brazil	1st	200 m	23.21
1991	South American Championships	Manaus, Brazil	2nd	4 × 100 m relay	45.00
1991	South American Championships	Manaus, Brazil	2nd	4 × 400 m relay	3:36.56
1991	Pan American Games	Havana, Cuba	2nd	200 m	23.16
1991	Pan American Games	Havana, Cuba	2nd	400 m	50.14
1991	Pan American Games	Havana, Cuba	4th	4 × 100 m relay	44.68
1991	Pan American Games	Havana, Cuba	4th	4 × 400 m relay	3:31.39
1991	World Championships	Tokyo, Japan	6th	400 m	50.79
1992	Ibero-American Championships	Seville, Spain	1st	400 m	51.66
1992	Ibero-American Championships	Seville, Spain	3rd	4 × 100 m relay	45.54
1992	Olympic Games	Barcelona, Spain	3rd	400 m	49.64
1992	World Cup	Havana, Cuba	3rd	4 × 400 m relay	3:29.73^{2}
1993	World Championships	Stuttgart, Germany	5th	400 m	50.91
1993	Central American and Caribbean Games	Ponce, Puerto Rico	3rd	200 m	23.88
1993	Central American and Caribbean Games	Ponce, Puerto Rico	2nd	4 × 100 m relay	44.62
1994	Ibero-American Championships	Mar del Plata, Argentina	1st	200 m	23.07 w (+4.4 m/s)
1994	Ibero-American Championships	Mar del Plata, Argentina	1st	400 m	52.69
1994	Ibero-American Championships	Mar del Plata, Argentina	1st	4 × 100 m relay	44.87
1994	Ibero-American Championships	Mar del Plata, Argentina	1st	4 × 400 m relay	3:35.35
1994	South American Games	Valencia, Venezuela	1st	400 m	51.31
1995	Pan American Games	Mar del Plata, Argentina	1st (h)	400 m	52.65
1995	South American Championships	Manaus, Brazil	1st	400 m	51.93
1995	South American Championships	Manaus, Brazil	1st	400 m hurdles	57.42
1995	South American Championships	Manaus, Brazil	1st	4 × 400 m relay	3:33.37
1995	World Championships	Gothenburg, Sweden	17th (sf)	400 m	51.82
1996	Ibero-American Championships	Medellín, Colombia	2nd	400 m	50.87
1996	Ibero-American Championships	Medellín, Colombia	1st	4 × 400 m relay	3:33.69
1996	Olympic Games	Atlanta, United States	–	400 m	DNF
1998	Ibero-American Championships	Lisbon, Portugal	–	4 × 100 m relay	DNF
1998	Ibero-American Championships	Lisbon, Portugal	2nd	4 × 400 m relay	3:33.69
2000	Olympic Games	Sydney, Australia	16th (sf)	4 × 100 m relay	44.37

^{1}Did not start in the semifinals
^{2}Representing the Americas
