= Melford Homela =

Zimbabwean middle-distance runner

Personal information
- Born: 3 June 1970 (age 56)
- Height: 1.67 m (5 ft 6 in)
- Weight: 55 kg (121 lb)

Sport
- Sport: Athletics
- Events: 800 m, 1500 m
- College team: RCC Tigers

Melford Homela (born 3 June 1970) is a retired Zimbabwean who competed in middle-distance events. He represented his country at the 1988 and 1992 Summer Olympics. He also won the bronze medal at the 1988 World Junior Championships.

His personal bests are 1:47.36 in the 800 metres (Seoul 1988) and 3:47.38 in the 1500 metres (Seoul 1988).

== International competitions ==
Year	Competition	Venue	Position	Event	Notes
Representing Zimbabwe
1988	World Junior Championships	Sudbury, Canada	3rd	800 m	1:51.34
1988	Olympic Games	Seoul, South Korea	29th (qf)	800 m	1:49.62
1988	Olympic Games	Seoul, South Korea	40th (h)	1500 m	3:47.38
1990	Commonwealth Games	Auckland, New Zealand	11th (sf)	800 m	1:48.53
1990	Commonwealth Games	Auckland, New Zealand	19th (h)	1500 m	3:50.89
1992	Olympic Games	Barcelona, Spain	38th (h)	800 m	1:50.50
