= Vladimir Ochkan =

Ukrainian athletics competitor

Vladimir Ochkan (born 13 January 1968) is a Ukrainian male former track and field athlete who competed in the long jump. He won the gold medal at the 1987 European Athletics Junior Championships with a championship record mark of 8.17 m (26 ft 9 1/2 in) – a record which still stands as of 2018. The following year he ranked second in the global indoor season with a best of 8.32 m (27 ft 3 1/2 in), behind American Larry Myricks. He set a lifetime best of 8.34 m (27 ft 4 1/4 in) outdoors that year, ranking eighth on the global lists.

Ochkan represented the Soviet Union twice at global level, reaching the finals at the 1991 World Championships in Athletics and the 1991 IAAF World Indoor Championships. He won one national title in his career, at the Ukrainian Indoor Championships in 1996.

== International competitions ==
Year	Competition	Venue	Position	Event	Notes
1987	European Junior Championships	Birmingham, United Kingdom	1st	Long jump	8.17 m
1991	World Indoor Championships	Seville, Spain	—	Long jump	NM
1991	World Championships	Tokyo, Japan	8th	Long jump	7.99 m w

== National titles ==
- Ukrainian Indoor Championships
  - Long jump: 1996
