= Henry Kirui =

Kenyan middle-distance runner

Medal record

Men's Athletics

Representing Kenya

World Championships
Gold medal – first place	1988 Sudbury	5000 m

Henry Kirui (born April 5, 1972) is a former Kenyan middle-distance runner who won a gold medal at the 1988 World Junior Championships in Sudbury in the 5000 m event.

== Achievements ==
Year	Competition	Venue	Position	Event	Notes
Representing Kenya
1988	World Junior Championships	Sudbury, Canada	1st	5000 m	13:54.62
