= Natalya Pomoshchnikova-Voronova =

Russian sprinter

Personal information
- Born: July 9, 1965 (age 61) Moscow, Soviet Union

Sport
- Sport: Track and field
Medal record
Representing Soviet Union
Olympic Games
| Bronze medal – third place | 1988 Seoul | 4×100 m relay |
World Championships
| Bronze medal – third place | 1987 Rome | 4×100 m relay |
Summer Universiade
| Silver medal – second place | 1987 Zagreb | 4x100 m relay |
| Silver medal – second place | 1989 Duisburg | 4x100 m relay |
| Bronze medal – third place | 1989 Duisburg | 100 m |
Representing Russia
World Championships
| Gold medal – first place | 1993 Stuttgart | 4×100 m relay |
World Indoor Championships
| Bronze medal – third place | 1993 Toronto | 200 m |
| Bronze medal – third place | 1995 Barcelona | 200 m |
European Championships
| Bronze medal – third place | 1998 Budapest | 4×100 m relay |

Natalya Voronova (Russian: Ната́лья Помо́щникова-Во́ронова, née Pomoshchnikova; born July 9, 1965) is a retired Russian sprint athlete who competed in the 100 and 200 metres for the Soviet Union and later Russia. A three time Olympian, she won an Olympic bronze medal in the 4 × 100 metres relay in 1988. She also won the 1992 World Cup 100 metres title, and a gold medal in the 4 × 100 metres relay at the 1993 World Championships.

Born Natalya Pomoschnikova in 1965, she trained at Burevestnik in Moscow. In 1984 she won the Soviet Championship 100 m title (tied with irina Slyusar). Four years later, she competed for the Soviet Union at the 1988 Olympic Games held in Seoul, South Korea, where she finished sixth in the 100 metres final and won a bronze medal in the 4 × 100 meters relay with her teammates Lyudmila Kondratyeva, Galina Malchugina and Marina Zhirova. In 1992, now competing under her married name of Voronova, she won the 100 metres at the IAAF World Cup in Havana and also finished second in the 200 metres behind Marie-Jose Perec. In 1993, she won a World Championship gold in the 4 × 100 m relay for Russia. She also finished sixth in both the 100 m and 200 m finals. At her second Olympics in 1996, she again finished sixth in the 100 metres final. She concluded her international career by competing at her third Olympics in 2000.

She retired after the Olympic season in 2000.

== Personal bests ==
- 100 metres - 10.98 (1988)
- 200 metres - 22.35 (1993)

== International competitions ==
| Year | Competition | Venue | Position | Event | Notes |
Representing Soviet Union
| 1983 | European Junior Championships | Schwechat, Austria | 1st | 100 m | 11.57 |
| 1983 | European Junior Championships | Schwechat, Austria | 2nd | 4 × 100 m relay | 44.44 |
| 1987 | Universiade | Zagreb, Yugoslavia | 4th | 100 m | 11.41 |
| 1987 | Universiade | Zagreb, Yugoslavia | 2nd | 4 × 100 m relay | 43.17 |
| 1987 | World Championships | Rome, Italy | 11th (sf) | 100 m | 11.15 |
| 1987 | World Championships | Rome, Italy | 3rd | 4 × 100 m relay | 42.33 |
| 1988 | Goodwill Games | Uniondale, United States | 7th | 100 m | 11.58 |
| 1988 | Goodwill Games | Uniondale, United States | 3rd | 4 × 100 m relay | 42.62 |
| 1988 | Olympic Games | Seoul, South Korea | 6th | 100 m | 11.00 |
| 1988 | Olympic Games | Seoul, South Korea | 3rd | 4 × 100 m relay | 42.75 |
| 1989 | World Cup | Barcelona, Spain | 7th | 100 m | 11.49 |
| 1989 | World Cup | Barcelona, Spain | 2nd | 4 × 100 m relay | 42.76 |
| 1989 | Universiade | Duisburg, West Germany | 3rd | 100 m | 11.48 |
| 1989 | Universiade | Duisburg, West Germany | 2nd | 4 × 100 m relay | 43.25 |
Representing Unified Team
| 1992 | European Indoor Championships | Genoa, Italy | 4th | 200 m | 23.38 |
| 1992 | World Cup | Havana, Cuba | 1st | 100 m | 11.33 |
| 1992 | World Cup | Havana, Cuba | 2nd | 200 m | 23.24 |
| 1992 | World Cup | Havana, Cuba | 5th | 4 × 100 m relay | 44.55 |
Representing Russia
| 1993 | World Indoor Championships | Toronto, Canada | 3rd | 200 m | 22.90 |
| 1993 | World Championships | Stuttgart, Germany | 6th | 100 m | 11.20 |
| 1993 | World Championships | Stuttgart, Germany | 6th | 200 m | 22.50 |
| 1993 | World Championships | Stuttgart, Germany | 1st | 4 × 100 m relay | 41.49 |
| 1994 | Goodwill Games | Saint Petersburg, Russia | 6th | 100 m | 11.39 |
| 1994 | Goodwill Games | Saint Petersburg, Russia | 5th | 200 m | 22.82 |
| 1994 | Goodwill Games | Saint Petersburg, Russia | — | 4 × 100 m relay | DNF |
| 1995 | World Indoor Championships | Barcelona, Spain | 3rd | 200 m | 23.01 |
| 1995 | World Championships | Gothenburg, Sweden | 16th (qf) | 100 m | 11.35 |
| 1995 | World Championships | Gothenburg, Sweden | — | 4 × 100 m relay | DNF |
| 1996 | Olympic Games | Atlanta, United States | 6th | 100 m | 11.10 |
| 1996 | Olympic Games | Atlanta, United States | 4th | 4 × 100 m relay | 42.27 |
| 1997 | European Cup | Munich, Germany | 1st | 100 m | 11.18 |
| 1997 | European Cup | Munich, Germany | 1st | 4 × 100 m relay | 43.05 |
| 1997 | World Championships | Athens, Greece | 9th (sf) | 100 m | 11.35 |
| 1998 | European Indoor Championships | Valencia, Spain | 6th | 200 m | 24.29 |
| 1998 | European Championships | Budapest, Hungary | 4th | 200 m | 22.80 |
| 1998 | European Championships | Budapest, Hungary | 3rd | 4 × 100 m relay | 42.73 |
| 2000 | European Indoor Championships | Ghent, Belgium | 5th (sf) | 200 m | 23.25 |
| 2000 | European Cup | Gateshead, United Kingdom | 2nd | 200 m | 22.81 |
| 2000 | European Cup | Gateshead, United Kingdom | 2nd | 4 × 100 m relay | 43.38 |
| 2000 | Olympic Games | Sydney, Australia | 26th (h) | 100 m | 11.47 |
| 2000 | Olympic Games | Sydney, Australia | 5th | 4 × 100 m relay | 43.02 |
(#) Indicates overall position in qualifying Heats (h) quarterfinals (qf) or semifinals (sf)

== National titles ==
- Soviet Athletics Championships
  - 100 m: 1984
- Russian Athletics Championships
  - 100 m: 1992, 1993, 1994
  - 200 m: 1992

== See also ==
- List of Olympic medalists in athletics (women)
- List of 1988 Summer Olympics medal winners
- List of World Athletics Championships medalists (women)
- List of IAAF World Indoor Championships medalists (women)
- List of European Athletics Championships medalists (women)
- List of 100 metres national champions (women)
- 4 × 100 metres relay at the World Championships in Athletics
