= Athletics at the 1991 Pan American Games – Women's 400 metres =

Women's 400 metres at the Pan American Games

The women's 400 metres event at the 1991 Pan American Games was held in Havana, Cuba on 4 and 5 August.

== Medalists ==
Gold	Silver	Bronze
Ana Fidelia Quirot; Cuba	Ximena Restrepo; Colombia	Jearl Miles; United States

== Results ==
=== Heats ===
Rank	Heat	Name	Nationality	Time	Notes
1	1	Ana Fidelia Quirot	Cuba	50.69	Q
2	2	Ximena Restrepo	Colombia	51.34	Q
3	1	Natasha Kaiser	United States	52.30	Q
4	1	Norfalia Carabalí	Colombia	52.50	Q
5	2	Jearl Miles	United States	52.52	Q
6	1	Sandie Richards	Jamaica	53.25	q
7	2	Nancy McLeón	Cuba	53.59	Q
8	2	Cathy Rattray	Jamaica	53.89	q
9	2	Adina Valdez	Trinidad and Tobago	54.06	
10	1	Camille Noel	Canada	54.61	
11	1	Claudia Acerenza	Uruguay	55.43	
12	2	Alana Yakiwchuk	Canada	55.61	
13	2	Inés Justet	Uruguay	56.36	
14	1	Zoila Stewart	Costa Rica	56.42	

=== Final ===
Rank	Name	Nationality	Time	Notes
1st place, gold medalist(s)	Ana Fidelia Quirot	Cuba	49.61	GR
2nd place, silver medalist(s)	Ximena Restrepo	Colombia	50.14	AR
3rd place, bronze medalist(s)	Jearl Miles	United States	50.82	
4	Natasha Kaiser	United States	51.20	
5	Norfalia Carabalí	Colombia	51.39	
6	Sandie Richards	Jamaica	52.45	
7	Cathy Rattray	Jamaica	53.41	
8	Nancy McLeón	Cuba	54.19	
