= Stacey Bowen =

Canadian sprinter

Personal information
- Born: December 17, 1969 (age 56) Ottawa, Canada

Sport
- Sport: Athletics
- Event: 200 metres
Medal record
Representing Canada
Commonwealth Games
Bronze medal – third place	1994 Victoria	4x400m relay

Stacey Bowen (born 17 December 1969) is a retired Canadian sprinter who competed primarily in the 200 metres. She represented her country at the 1993 World Championships reaching the quarterfinals.

Bowen was an All-American sprinter for the Alabama Crimson Tide track and field team, finishing 3rd in the 200 m at the 1994 NCAA Division I Indoor Track and Field Championships. She was also runner-up in the 4 × 100 meters relay at the 1993 NCAA Division I Outdoor Track and Field Championships.

== International competitions ==
Year	Competition	Venue	Position	Event	Notes
Representing Canada
1988	World Junior Championships	Sudbury, Canada	49th (h)	200 m	25.12
1990	Commonwealth Games	Auckland, New Zealand	13th (h)	200 m	24.16
1990	Commonwealth Games	Auckland, New Zealand	–	4 × 100 m relay	DQ
1991	Pan American Games	Havana, Cuba	6th	100 m	11.82
1991	Pan American Games	Havana, Cuba	9th (h)	200 m	24.02
1993	Universiade	Buffalo, United States	14th (sf)	100 m	11.84
1993	Universiade	Buffalo, United States	10th (sf)	200 m	23.62
1993	World Championships	Stuttgart, Germany	24th (h)	200 m	23.62
1993	World Championships	Stuttgart, Germany	9th (h)	4 × 100 m relay	44.36
1994	Jeux de la Francophonie	Bondoufle, France	1st	200 m	23.19
1994	Jeux de la Francophonie	Bondoufle, France	1st	4 × 400 m relay	3:38.12
1994	Commonwealth Games	Victoria, Canada	8th (sf)	200 m	23.35
1994	Commonwealth Games	Victoria, Canada	3rd	4 × 400 m relay	3:32.52

== Personal bests ==
Outdoor

- 100 metres – 12.04 (-0.9 m/s, Tuscaloosa 1999)
- 200 metres – 22.85 (+1.1 m/s, Fayetteville 1994)
- 400 metres – 52.82 (Montreal 1996)

Indoor

- 200 metres – 23.47 (Indianapolis 1993)
