= Oksana Stepicheva =

Russian former track and field athlete (born 1969)

- Оксана Степичева
- Born: Oksana Kovalyova; 3 September 1969 (age 56)
- Occupations: track and field athlete

Medal record

Women's athletics

Representing Unified Team

European Indoor Championships
Gold medal – first place	1992 Genoa	200 m

Oksana Stepicheva (née Kovalyova; Russian: Оксана Степичева; born 3 September 1969) is a Russian former track and field athlete who competed in sprinting events for the Soviet Union and Russia. She is the 1992 European Indoor Champion in the 200 metres.

== Career ==
Born Oksana Kovalyova (Russian: Оксана Ковалёва), she won her first international medal at the 1987 European Athletics Junior Championships, finishing as runner-up to East Germany's Diana Dietz in the 200 metres. The two repeated this finish in the 4 × 100 metres relay, where the Soviet women's team which included Lyudmila Dmitriadi took second place. She changed her name to Stepicheva in 1989 and competed under that name for the rest of her career.

Stepicheva rose to the top of the national scene with a 200 m win at the 1990 Soviet Athletics Championships, where she ran a best of 22.97 seconds. This was to be her sole outdoor national title. An indoor national title followed in 1991 and she repeated that win at the interim Commonwealth of Independent States indoor championships in 1992.

The 1992 season was to be the most successful of her career. First, she ran a personal best indoors of 22.97 seconds at the Meeting Pas de Calais in France. Then, she went on to win the gold medal in the 200 m at the 1992 European Athletics Indoor Championships, holding off Romania's Iolanda Oanta to claim her first senior European title. She ran a lifetime best of 22.73 seconds in Duisburg in the outdoor season, ranking her in the top 25 in the world that year, but it proved to be her last season of major competition.

== International competitions ==
Year	Competition	Venue	Position	Event	Notes
Representing Soviet Union
1986	World Junior Championships	Athens, Greece	5th	200 m	23.60
1986	World Junior Championships	Athens, Greece	5th	4 × 100 m	44.58
1987	European Junior Championships	Birmingham, United Kingdom	2nd	200 m	23.51
1987	European Junior Championships	Birmingham, United Kingdom	2nd	4 × 100 m	44.80
1988	World Junior Championships	Sudbury, Canada	6th	200 m	23.64
1988	World Junior Championships	Sudbury, Canada	DNF (final)	4 × 100 m	44.64 (heats)
Representing Unified Team
1992	European Indoor Championships	Genoa, Italy	1st	200 m	23.18
