= Addis Abebe =

Ethiopian long-distance runner (born 1970)

Addis Abebe (Haddish Abebe)
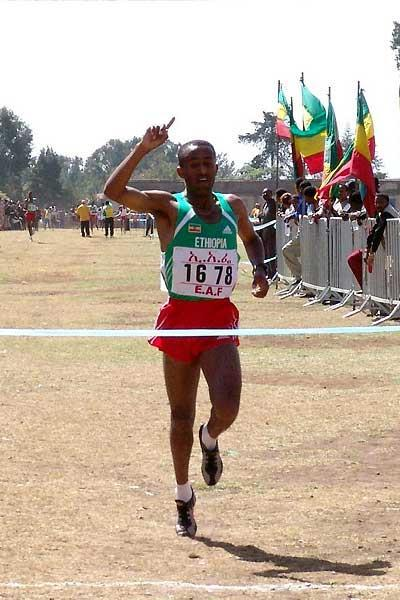

Personal information
- Full name: Haddish Abebe Tsegaye
- Born: September 5, 1970 (age 55) Raya, Tigray, Ethiopia
- Spouse: Lemlem G/selassie

Sport
- Country: Ethiopia

Achievements and titles
- Olympic finals: 10,000 metres at the 1992, Summer Olympics, Barcelona (ESP)
- Highest world ranking: World Cross Country Championships; Long Race Budapest (HUN), 26 Mar 1994; Senior Race Amorebieta-Etxano (ESP), 28 Mar 1993; World (continental) cup 10,000 metres, Estadio Panamericano, La Habana (CUB) 25 Sep 1992; 10,000 metres, Estadio Olímpico, Barcelona (ESP), 8 Sep 1989
Medal record
Men's athletics
Representing Ethiopia
Olympic Games
| Bronze medal – third place | 1992 Barcelona | 10,000 m |
African Championships
| Gold medal – first place | 1989 Lagos | 10,000 m |
| Silver medal – second place | 1989 Lagos | 5000 m |
| Bronze medal – third place | 1990 Cairo | 10,000 m |
- Updated on 5 May 2018

Addis Abebe (Amharic: አዲስ አበበ; born September 5, 1970) is a former long-distance runner from Ethiopia, best known for winning a bronze medal in the 10,000 metres event at the 1992 Summer Olympics.

In the 1988 World Junior Championships, Abebe won the gold medal in the 10,000 metres and a bronze in the 5,000 meters events.

== International competitions ==
| Year | Competition | Venue | Position | Event | Notes |
Representing Ethiopia
| 1988 | World Junior Championships | Sudbury, Canada | 3rd | 5,000 m | 13:58.08 |
| 1988 | World Junior Championships | Sudbury, Canada | 1st | 10,000 m | 28:42.13 |
| 1989 | African Championships | Lagos, Nigeria | 2nd | 5,000 m | 13:35.09 |
| 1989 | African Championships | Lagos, Nigeria | 1st | 10,000 m | 27:51.07 |
| 1990 | African Championships | Cairo, Egypt | 3rd | 10,000 m | 28:34.40 |
| 1990 | Goodwill Games | Seattle, Washington, United States | 2nd | 5000 m | 13:35.67 |
| 1990 | Goodwill Games | Seattle, Washington, United States | 2nd | 10,000 m | 27:42.65 |
| 1991 | World Championships | Tokyo, Japan | 13th | 10,000 m | 28:33.44 |
| 1992 | Olympic Games | Barcelona, Spain | 3rd | 10,000 m | 28:00.07 |
| 1992 | IAAF World Cup | Havana, Cuba | 1st | 10,000 m | 28:44.38 |

== Personal bests ==
- 5,000 metres - 13:58.08 (1988)
- 10,000 metres - 27:17.82 (1989)
- Half marathon - 1:02:40 (1998)
