= Cheryl Taplin =

American sprinter

Personal information
- Born: September 2, 1972 (age 54) Seattle, Washington, United States
- Education: Louisiana State University
- Height: 5 ft 5 in (165 cm)
- Weight: 120 lb (54 kg)

Sport
- Sport: Track and field
- Events: 100 m, 200 m
- College team: LSU Tigers
- Coached by: Donald Quarrie
Medal record
Representing United States
Summer Universiade
Gold medal – first place	1993 Buffalo	4x100 m relay
Gold medal – first place	1995 Fukuoka	4x100 m relay

Cheryl Taplin (born September 2, 1972) is a retired American track and field athlete who specialized in sprinting events. She represented her country at two consecutive World Championships, in 1997 and 1999. Taplin was elected to the Louisiana State University Hall of Fame in 2006 and the Penn Relays Wall of Fame in 2014.

Taplin is currently the Executive Assistant to the Head Coach, and the Assistant Director of Operations, for the University of Southern California Football Team. She is also working on her master's degree in Communication Management at USC.

== Competition record ==
Year	Competition	Venue	Position	Event	Notes
Representing the United States
1993	Universiade	Buffalo, United States	7th (sf)	100 m	11.46
1993	Universiade	Buffalo, United States	1st	4×100 m relay	43.37
1994	Goodwill Games	St. Petersburg, Russia	7th	100 m	11.48
1994	Goodwill Games	St. Petersburg, Russia	1st	4×100 m relay	42.98
1995	Universiade	Fukuoka, Japan	23rd (qf)	100 m	11.98
1995	Universiade	Fukuoka, Japan	1st	4×100 m relay	43.58
1997	World Championships	Athens, Greece	19th (qf)	200 m	23.07
1998	Goodwill Games	Uniondale, United States	4th	200 m	22.79
1998	Goodwill Games	Uniondale, United States	1st	4×100 m relay	42.06
1998	World Cup	Johannesburg, South Africa	1st	4×100 m relay	42.00
1999	World Championships	Seville, Spain	21st (qf)	100 m	11.33
1999	World Championships	Seville, Spain	4th	4×100 m relay	42.30

== Personal bests ==
Outdoor

- 100 meters – 11.07 (+1.8 m/s, Baton Rouge 1994)
- 200 meters – 22.79 (+0.4 m/s, Uniondale 1998)

Indoor

- 60 meters – 7.17 (Atlanta 1999)
