= Liliana Allen =

Cuban track and field athlete

Personal information
- Born: May 24, 1970 (age 56) Holguín, Cuba
Medal record
Women's Athletics
World Indoor Championships
Representing Cuba
| Bronze medal – third place | 1991 Seville | 60 metres |
Pan American Games
Representing Mexico
| Bronze medal – third place | 2003 Santo Domingo | 100 metres |
Representing Cuba
| Gold medal – first place | 1991 Havana | 100 metres |
| Gold medal – first place | 1991 Havana | 200 metres |
| Gold medal – first place | 1995 Mar del Plata | 200 metres |
| Silver medal – second place | 1987 Indianapolis | 4x100 m relay |
| Silver medal – second place | 1991 Havana | 4x100 m relay |
| Silver medal – second place | 1995 Mar del Plata | 4x100 m relay |
| Silver medal – second place | 1995 Mar del Plata | 100 metres |
Central American and Caribbean Games
Representing Mexico
| Gold medal – first place | 2002 San Salvador | 100 metres |
| Gold medal – first place | 2002 San Salvador | 200 metres |
Representing Cuba
| Gold medal – first place | 1990 Mexico City | 100 metres |
| Gold medal – first place | 1990 Mexico City | 200 metres |
| Gold medal – first place | 1993 Ponce | 100 metres |
| Gold medal – first place | 1993 Ponce | 200 metres |
Summer Universiade
Representing Cuba
| Gold medal – first place | 1989 Duisburg | 100 metres |
| Silver medal – second place | 1989 Duisburg | 4x100 m relay |
| Silver medal – second place | 1993 Buffalo | 4x100 m relay |

Liliana Allen Doll (born March 24, 1970) is a track and field athlete, who started competing for Mexico in 1998. She previously represented Cuba. She won a bronze medal at the 1991 IAAF World Indoor Championships in the 60 metres.

== Career ==
She has participated in the 1992, 1996 and 2004 Summer Olympics. At the Pan American Games she has won three gold medals, four silver, and one bronze medal.

== Achievements ==
| Year | Competition | Venue | Position | Event | Notes |
Representing Cuba
| 1986 | Central American and Caribbean Junior Championships (U-17) | Mexico City, México | 1st | 100 m | 11.83 A |
| 1986 | Central American and Caribbean Junior Championships (U-17) | Mexico City, México | 3rd | 200 m | 24.81 A |
| 1987 | Pan American Games | Indianapolis, United States | 4th | 100 m | 11.51 |
| 1987 | Pan American Games | Indianapolis, United States | 2nd | 4 × 100 m relay | 44.16 |
| 1988 | World Junior Championships | Sudbury, Canada | 3rd | 100m | 11.36 (-0.4 m/s) |
| 1988 | World Junior Championships | Sudbury, Canada | 3rd | 200m | 22.97 w (+2.3 m/s) |
| 1988 | World Junior Championships | Sudbury, Canada | 2nd | 4 × 100 m relay | 44.04 |
| 1989 | World Indoor Championships | Budapest, Hungary | 4th | 60 m | 7.16 |
| 1989 | Central American and Caribbean Championships | San Juan, Puerto Rico | 2nd | 100 m | 11.32 |
| 1989 | Central American and Caribbean Championships | San Juan, Puerto Rico | 3rd | 200 m | 23.27 |
| 1989 | Central American and Caribbean Championships | San Juan, Puerto Rico | 1st | 4 × 100 m relay | 45.12 |
| 1989 | Universiade | Duisburg, Germany | 1st | 100 m | 11.37 |
| 1989 | Universiade | Duisburg, Germany | 2nd | 200 m | 23.00 |
| 1989 | Universiade | Duisburg, Germany | 5th | 4 × 100 m relay | 44.73 |
| 1990 | Central American and Caribbean Games | Mexico City, Mexico | 1st | 100 m | 11.33 (w) |
| 1990 | Central American and Caribbean Games | Mexico City, Mexico | 1st | 200 m | 23.27 |
| 1990 | Central American and Caribbean Games | Mexico City, Mexico | 1st | 4 × 100 m relay | 44.54 |
| 1991 | World Indoor Championships | Seville, Spain | 3rd | 60 m | 7.12 |
| 1991 | Pan American Games | Havana, Cuba | 1st | 100 m | 11.39 |
| 1991 | Pan American Games | Havana, Cuba | 1st | 200 m | 23.11 |
| 1991 | Pan American Games | Havana, Cuba | 2nd | 4 × 100 m relay | 44.31 |
| 1991 | World Championships | Tokyo, Japan | 15th (sf) | 100 m | 11.53 (-0.1 m/s) |
| 1992 | Ibero-American Championships | Seville, Spain | 1st | 100m | 11.39 (-0.8 m/s) |
| 1992 | Ibero-American Championships | Seville, Spain | 1st | 4 × 100 m relay | 44.49 |
| 1992 | Olympic Games | Barcelona, Spain | 8th | 100 m | 11.19 |
| 1992 | Olympic Games | Barcelona, Spain | (f) | 4 × 100 m relay | DNF |
| 1992 | World Cup | Havana, Cuba | 2nd | 100 m | 11.34 |
| 1993 | World Indoor Championships | Toronto, Canada | 4th | 60 m | 7.22 |
| 1993 | Universiade | Buffalo, United States | 2nd | 100 m | 11.57 |
| 1993 | Universiade | Buffalo, United States | 5th | 200 m | 22.90 |
| 1993 | Universiade | Buffalo, United States | – | 4 × 100 m relay | DQ |
| 1993 | World Championships | Stuttgart, Germany | 8th | 100 m | 11.23 (-0.3 m/s) |
| 1993 | Central American and Caribbean Games | Ponce, Puerto Rico | 1st | 100 m | 11.52 |
| 1993 | Central American and Caribbean Games | Ponce, Puerto Rico | 1st | 200 m | 23.14 |
| 1993 | Central American and Caribbean Games | Ponce, Puerto Rico | 1st | 4 × 100 m relay | 44.59 |
| 1994 | World Cup | London, United Kingdom | 2nd | 100 m | 11.50 |
| 1995 | World Indoor Championships | Barcelona, Spain | 4th | 60 m | 7.13 |
| 1995 | Pan American Games | Mar del Plata, Argentina | 2nd | 100 m | 11.16 w |
| 1995 | Pan American Games | Mar del Plata, Argentina | 1st | 200 m | 22.73 |
| 1995 | World Championships | Gothenburg, Sweden | 10th (sf) | 100 m | 11.24 (+1.4 m/s) |
| 1996 | Olympic Games | Atlanta, United States | heats | 4 × 100 m relay | 44.32 |
Representing Mexico
| 1998 | Central American and Caribbean Games | Maracaibo, Venezuela | 8th | 100 m | 19.31 |
| 2001 | World Indoor Championships | Lisbon, Portugal | semi-final | 60 m | 7.24 |
| 2002 | Central American and Caribbean Games | San Salvador, El Salvador | 1st | 100m | 11.34 w (+2.3 m/s) |
| 2002 | Central American and Caribbean Games | San Salvador, El Salvador | 1st | 200m | 23.34 (wind: 0.0 m/s) |
| 2003 | World Indoor Championships | Birmingham, United Kingdom | semi-final | 60 m | 7.25 |
| 2003 | Pan American Games | Santo Domingo, Dominican Republic | 3rd | 100 m | 11.28 |
| 2004 | Olympic Games | Athens, Greece | quarter-final | 100 m | 11.52 |
