= Charmaine Gilgeous =

Antigua and Barbuda sprinter

Personal information
- Nationality: Antigua and Barbuda
- Born: 17 December 1971 (age 54)

Sport
- Sport: Sprinting
- Event: 400 metres

Achievements and titles
- Personal bests: 100 m: 11.93 (Sudbury 1988); 400 m: 55.48 (Barcelona 1992)

Charmaine Ann Marie Gilgeous (born 17 December 1971) is a former sprinter from Antigua and Barbuda.

== High school and college ==
In high school, Gilgeous was an Ontario provincial champion in the midget 200 metres in 1986, midget 100 metres in 1987, and junior 100 metres in 1988. She later sprinted collegiately at the University of Alabama, where she became a five-time All-American.

== Olympics ==
Gilgeous competed for Antigua and Barbuda in the women's 400 metres, at the 1992 Summer Olympics, where she finished fifth in the opening heats and did not advance.

== Personal life ==
Gilgeous later pursued a career in banking. She is the mother of 2x NBA MVP Shai Gilgeous-Alexander.
