= Anzhelika Shevchuk =

Ukrainian sprinter

Anzhelika Shevchuk (born 23 February 1969) is a retired Ukrainian sprinter who specialized in the 100 metres.

In 1992 she became the first Ukrainian champion in the 100 metres. In the 4 x 100 metres relay she finished fourth at the 1998 European Championships, and competed at the 1999 World Championships without reaching the final.

Her personal best times are 7.17 seconds in the 60 metres (indoor), achieved in January 1999 in Zaporizhzhya; and 11.34 seconds in the 100 metres, achieved in July 2000 in Kyiv.
