= Katrin Krabbe =

German sprinter (born 1969)

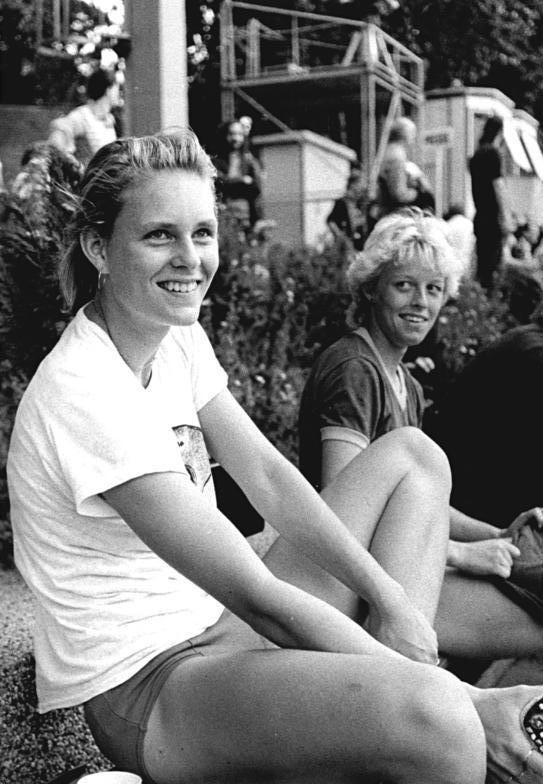
- Krabbe in 1988

Personal information
- Born: 22 November 1969 (age 56) Neubrandenburg, East Germany
- Height: 182 cm (6 ft 0 in)
- Weight: 69 kg (152 lb)

Sport
- Country: East Germany
- Sport: Athletics
- Event: Women's sprints
Medal record
Women's athletics
Representing Germany
World Championships
Gold medal – first place	1991 Tokyo	100 m
Gold medal – first place	1991 Tokyo	200 m
Bronze medal – third place	1991 Tokyo	4 × 100 m
Bronze medal – third place	1991 Tokyo	4 × 400 m
Representing East Germany
European Championships
Gold medal – first place	1990 Split	100 m
Gold medal – first place	1990 Split	200 m
Gold medal – first place	1990 Split	4 × 100 m
- Updated on 9 February 2014

Katrin Krabbe (German pronunciation: [ˈkatʁiːn ˈkʁabə]; later Zimmermann; born 22 November 1969) is a German former track and field athlete. She represented East Germany (GDR) at the 1988 Seoul Olympics, and went on to win the 100 metres and 200 metres titles at the 1991 World Championships in Tokyo, representing a unified Germany. Her best times are 10.89 secs for 100 m (1988) and 21.95 secs for 200 m (1990).

== Life and career ==
Krabbe was a successful track star, winning the 100 m and 200 m titles in the 1990 European Athletics Championships (held in Split) and the same titles at the 1991 World Championships in Athletics (held in Tokyo, where she beat Gwen Torrence and Merlene Ottey). She was also part of the winning 4 × 100 metres relay East German women's team in the European Championships.

In 1992, Krabbe along with teammates Silke Möller and Grit Breuer tested positive for the stimulant clenbuterol. All three athletes were suspended for one year by the German Athletics Federation, but the International Association of Athletics Federations (IAAF) extended this to two years. Krabbe sued the IAAF and received damages (1.2 million DM), while Breuer did not and was able to compete again after the ban. The suspension kept Krabbe from competing in the 1992 Summer Olympics, and effectively ended her athletic career.

== Personal bests ==
100 m – 10.89 +1.8 (Berlin 20 July 1988)

200 m – 21.95 +0.3 (Split 30 August 1990)

== Achievements ==
Year	Competition	Venue	Position	Event	Notes
Representing East Germany
1986	World Junior Championships	Athens, Greece	4th	100 m	11.49 (wind: +0.9 m/s)
1986	World Junior Championships	Athens, Greece	3rd	200 m	23.31 (wind: +0.6 m/s)
1986	World Junior Championships	Athens, Greece	2nd	4 × 100 m	43.97
1987	European Junior Championships	Birmingham, England	1st	4 × 100 m	44.62
1988	World Junior Championships	Greater Sudbury, Canada	2nd	100 m	11.23 (wind: -0.4 m/s)
1988	World Junior Championships	Greater Sudbury, Canada	1st	200 m	22.34 w (wind: +2.3 m/s)
1988	World Junior Championships	Greater Sudbury, Canada	1st	4 × 100 m	43.48
1988	Olympic Games	Seoul, South Korea	semi-final	200 m	22.59
1990	European Championships	Split, Yugoslavia	1st	100 m	10.89 (wind: +1.8 m/s)
1990	European Championships	Split, Yugoslavia	1st	200 m	21.95 (wind: +0.3 m/s)
1990	European Championships	Split, Yugoslavia	1st	4 × 100 m	41.68
Representing Germany
1991	World Indoor Championships	Seville, Spain	6th	60 m	7.20
1991	World Championships	Tokyo, Japan	1st	100 m	10.99
1991	World Championships	Tokyo, Japan	1st	200 m	22.09
1991	World Championships	Tokyo, Japan	3rd	4 × 100 m	42.33
1991	World Championships	Tokyo, Japan	3rd	4 × 400 m	3:21.25

== See also ==
- List of sportspeople sanctioned for doping offences
- German all-time top lists – 100 metres
- German all-time top lists – 200 metres

Awards
Preceded by (Germany) Steffi Graf	German Sportswoman of the Year; 1990–1991	Succeeded by (Germany) Heike Henkel
