= Eusebia Riquelme =

Cuban sprinter

Personal information
- Born: November 27, 1969 (age 56)
Medal record
Women's Athletics
Representing Cuba
Pan American Games
Silver medal – second place	1991 Havana	4x100 m relay
CAC Junior Championships (U20)
Silver medal – second place	1986 Mexico City	200 m

Eusebia Riquelme (born November 27, 1969) is a retired female track and field athlete from Cuba who competed in the sprint events during her career.

== Career ==
She won the silver medal in the women's 4 x 100 metres relay at the 1991 Pan American Games, alongside teammates Liliana Allen, Julia Duporty and Idalmis Bonne.

== Achievements ==
Year	Competition	Venue	Position	Event	Notes
Representing Cuba
1986	Central American and Caribbean Junior Championships (U-20)	Mexico City, México	2nd	100 m	11.85
1986	Central American and Caribbean Junior Championships (U-20)	Mexico City, México	4th	200 m	25.21
1988	World Junior Championships	Sudbury, Canada	5th	100m	11.57 (wind: -0.4 m/s)
1988	World Junior Championships	Sudbury, Canada	2nd	4 × 100 m relay	44.04
1992	Ibero-American Championships	Seville, Spain	5th	200m	24.62 (wind: -2.9 m/s)
1992	Ibero-American Championships	Seville, Spain	1st	4 × 100 m relay	44.49
