= Athletics at the 1989 Summer Universiade =

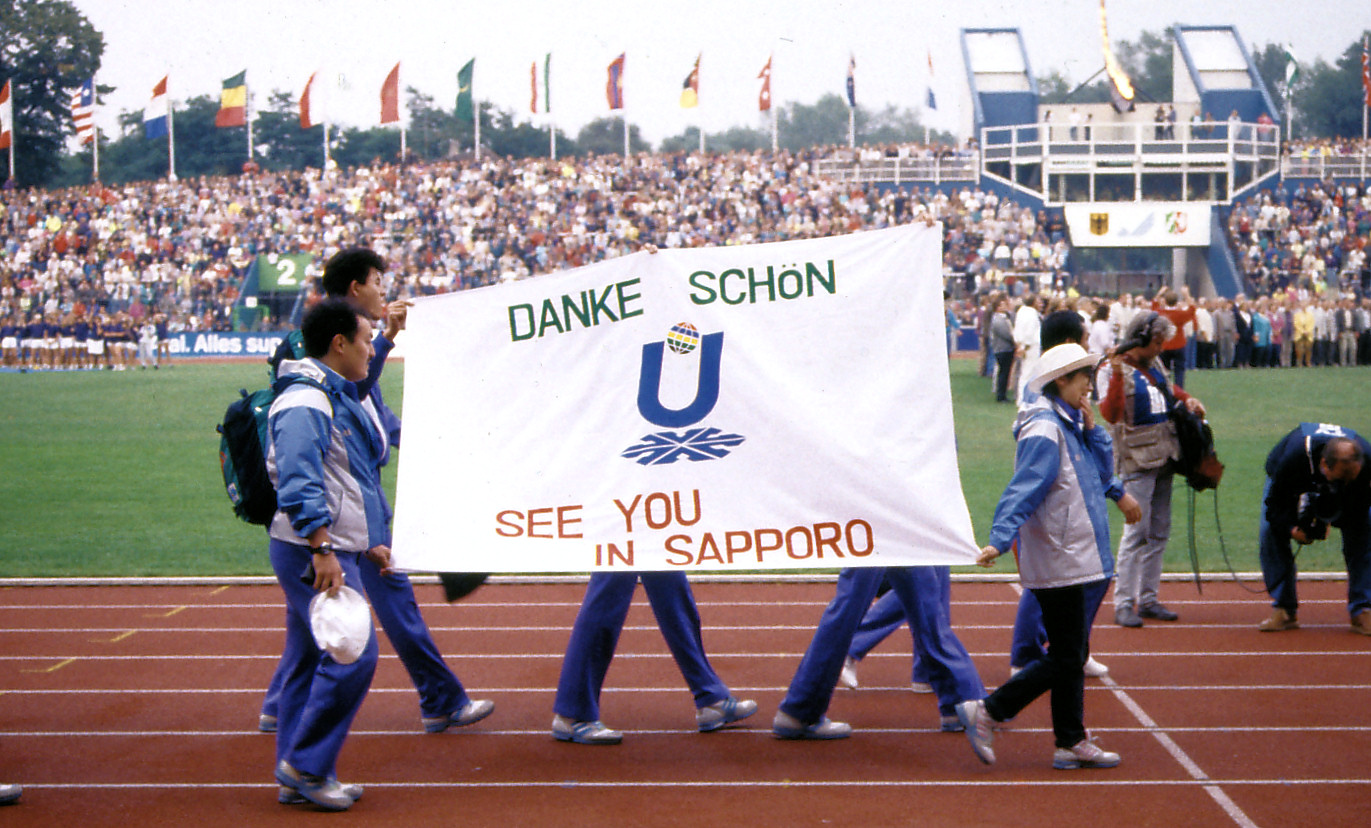
- Dates: August 25–30, 1989
- Host city: Duisburg; West Germany
- Venue: Wedaustadion
- Events: 42
- Records set: 11 Games records

At the 1989 Summer Universiade, the athletics events were held at the Wedaustadion in Duisburg in West Germany from August 22–30. A total of 42 events were contested, of which 23 by male and 19 by female athletes.

== Medal summary ==
=== Men ===
Event	Gold		Silver		Bronze	
100 metres (wind: -1.3 m/s)	Andre Cason (USA)	10.29	Olapade Adeniken (NGR)	10.35	Joel Isasi (CUB)	10.41
200 metres (wind: +3.4 m/s)	Robson Caetano (BRA)	20.33w	Félix Stevens (CUB)	20.58w	Kevin Braunskill (USA)	20.62w
400 metres	Roberto Hernández (CUB)	45.42	Sérgio Menezes (BRA)	45.66	Oliver Bridges (USA)	45.66
800 metres	Ari Suhonen (FIN)	1:47.13	Ikem Billy (GBR)	1:47.29	Simon Doyle (AUS)	1:47.48
1500 metres	Kip Cheruiyot (KEN)	3:40.38	Peter Rono (KEN)	3:40.79	Bob Dielis (NED)	3:40.93
5000 metres	Stefano Mei (ITA)	13:39.04 GR	Charles Cheruiyot (KEN)	13:39.42	Antonio Serrano (ESP)	13:39.50
10,000 metres	Julius Kariuki (KEN)	28:35.46 GR	Zeki Öztürk (TUR)	28:39.56	Antonio Serrano (ESP)	28:43.97
Marathon	Tibor Baier (HUN)	2:14:33 GR	Rustam Shagiyev (URS)	2:14:59	Kennedy Manyisa (KEN)	2:15:23
110 metres hurdles (wind: -1.4 m/s)	Roger Kingdom (USA)	13.26 GR	Emilio Valle (CUB)	13.52	Florian Schwarthoff (FRG)	13.63
400 metres hurdles	Reggie Davis (USA)	49.74	Vladimir Budko (URS)	50.30	Kevin Henderson (USA)	50.57
3000 metres steeplechase	Patrick Sang (KEN)	8:32.78	Engelbert Franz (FRG)	8:33.25	Thierry Brusseau (FRA)	8:35.78
4 × 100 metres relay	United States (USA); Slip Watkins; Tony Dees; Andre Cason; Michael Marsh	38.58	Soviet Union (URS); Andrey Razin; Dmitriy Vanyaykin; Andrey Fedoriv; Igor Groshev	39.35	France (FRA); Pierre Boutry; Francis Darlis; Laurent Leconte; Jean-Charles Trouabal	39.67
4 × 400 metres relay	Jamaica (JAM); Patrick O'Connor; Devon Morris; Howard Davis; Howard Burnett	3:02.58	United States (USA); Stanley Kerr; George Porter; Michael Johnson; Raymond Pierre	3:02.75	West Germany (FRG); Ulrich Schlepütz; Markus Henrich; Carsten Köhrbrück; Edgar Itt	3:03.69
20 kilometres walk	Walter Arena (ITA)	1:23:25 GR	Miguel Ángel Prieto (ESP)	1:23:39	Andrew Jachno (AUS)	1:23:48
High jump	Javier Sotomayor (CUB)	2.34 m	Hollis Conway (USA)	2.31 m	Rudolf Povarnitsyn (URS)	2.31 m
Pole vault	Bernhard Zintl (FRG)	5.65 m	Dean Starkey (USA)	5.60 m	Javier García (ESP)	5.40 m
Long jump	Jaime Jefferson (CUB)	7.98 m	Vladimir Ratushkov (URS)	7.96 m	Llewellyn Starks (USA)	7.91 m
Triple jump	Igor Lapshin (URS)	17.40 m	Tord Henriksson (SWE)	16.94 m	Oleg Sakirkin (URS)	16.93 m
Shot put	Lars Arvid Nilsen (NOR)	20.67 m	Mike Stulce (USA)	20.58 m	Kalman Konya (FRG)	20.37 m
Discus throw	Kamy Keshmiri (USA)	65.40 m	Erik de Bruin (NED)	64.40 m	Roberto Moya (CUB)	63.78 m
Hammer throw	Igor Astapkovich (URS)	80.56 m GR	Heinz Weis (FRG)	79.58 m	Ken Flax (USA)	75.86 m
Javelin throw	Steve Backley (GBR)	85.60 m GR	Pascal Lefevre (FRA)	82.56 m	Marko Hyytiäinen (FIN)	81.52 m
Decathlon	Dave Johnson (USA)	8216 pts	Mikhail Medved (URS)	8062 pts	Dezsõ Szabó (HUN)	8031 pts

=== Women ===
Event	Gold		Silver		Bronze	
100 metres (wind: -1.4 m/s)	Liliana Allen (CUB)	11.37	Anita Howard (USA)	11.47	Natalya Voronova (URS)	11.48
200 metres (wind: +0.3 m/s)	Galina Malchugina (URS)	22.70	Liliana Allen (CUB)	23.00	Esther Jones (USA)	23.02
400 metres	Ana Fidelia Quirot (CUB)	50.73	Jearl Miles (USA)	52.41	Lyudmila Dzhigalova (URS)	52.69
800 metres	Ana Fidelia Quirot (CUB)	1:58.88	Ellen van Langen (NED)	1:59.82	Inna Yevseyeva (URS)	2:01.03
1500 metres	Paula Ivan (ROM)	4:13.58	Suzy Favor (USA)	4:14.92	Lyudmila Rogachova (URS)	4:15.11
3000 metres	Paula Ivan (ROM)	8:44.09 GR	Viorica Ghican (ROM)	8:46.27	Regina Chistyakova (URS)	8:55.73
10,000 metres	Viorica Ghican (ROM)	31:46.43 GR	Masami Ishizaka (JPN)	32:16.24	Lizanne Bussières (CAN)	32:28.38
Marathon	Irina Bogachova (URS)	2:35:09 GR	Akemi Takayama (JPN)	2:39:58	Kim Yen-Ku (KOR)	2:40:52
100 metres hurdles (wind: +1.5 m/s)	Monique Ewanjé-Épée (FRA)	12.65 GR, NR	Lidiya Okolo-Kulak (URS)	12.73	Claudia Zaczkiewicz (FRG)	12.78
400 metres hurdles	Margarita Khromova (URS)	57.03	Rosey Edeh (CAN)	57.06	Irmgard Trojer (ITA)	57.94
4 × 100 metres relay	United States (USA); Michelle Burrell; Anita Howard; LaMonda Miller; Esther Jones	42.40 GR	Soviet Union (URS); Nadezhda Roshchupkina; Galina Malchugina; Tatyana Papilina; Natalya Voronova	43.25	West Germany (FRG); Claudia Zaczkiewicz; Ulrike Sarvari; Karin Janke; Silke-Beate Knoll	43.85
4 × 400 metres relay	United States (USA); Celena Mondie-Milner; Natasha Kaiser-Brown; Jearl Miles; Terri Dendy	3:26.48	West Germany (FRG); Linda Kisabaka; Karin Janke; Gabriela Lesch; Helga Arendt	3:27.02	Soviet Union (URS); Yelena Vinogradova; Margarita Ponomaryova; Yelena Golesheva; Lyudmila Dzhigalova	3:28.60
5 kilometres walk	Ileana Salvador (ITA)	20:44	Vera Makolova (URS)	20:52	Sari Essayah (FIN)	21:34
High jump	Alina Astafei (ROM)	1.91 m	Silvia Costa (CUB)	1.91 m	Jin Ling (CHN)	1.88 m
Long jump	Yolanda Chen (URS)	6.72 m	Marieta Ilcu (ROM)	6.71 m	Katja Trostel (GDR)	6.49 m
Shot put	Huang Zhihong (CHN)	20.56 m	Belsis Laza (CUB)	19.32 m	Zhou Tianhua (CHN)	18.71 m
Discus throw	Hou Xuemei (CHN)	65.32 m	Gabriele Reinsch (GDR)	65.20 m	Maritza Martén (CUB)	64.70 m
Javelin throw(Old javelin model)	Silke Renk (GDR)	66.09 m	Brigitte Graune (FRG)	62.13 m	Päivi Alafrantti (FIN)	61.75 m
Heptathlon	Larisa Nikitina (URS)	6847 pts GR	Sabine Braun (FRG)	6575 pts	Jane Flemming (AUS)	6286 pts

== Medal table ==
* Host nation (West Germany)

Rank	Nation	Gold	Silver	Bronze	Total
1	United States (USA)	8	7	6	21
2	Soviet Union (URS)	7	8	8	23
3	Cuba (CUB)	6	5	3	14
4	Romania (ROM)	4	2	0	6
5	Kenya (KEN)	3	2	1	6
6	Italy (ITA)	3	0	1	4
7	China (CHN)	2	0	2	4
8	West Germany (FRG)*	1	5	5	11
9	France (FRA)	1	1	2	4
10	East Germany (GDR)	1	1	1	3
11	Brazil (BRA)	1	1	0	2
11	Great Britain (GBR)	1	1	0	2
13	Finland (FIN)	1	0	3	4
14	Hungary (HUN)	1	0	1	2
15	Jamaica (JAM)	1	0	0	1
15	Norway (NOR)	1	0	0	1
17	Netherlands (NED)	0	2	1	3
18	Japan (JPN)	0	2	0	2
19	Spain (ESP)	0	1	3	4
20	Canada (CAN)	0	1	1	2
21	Nigeria (NGR)	0	1	0	1
21	Sweden (SWE)	0	1	0	1
21	Turkey (TUR)	0	1	0	1
24	Australia (AUS)	0	0	3	3
25	South Korea (KOR)	0	0	1	1
Totals (25 entries)		42	42	42	126

== See also ==
- 1989 in the sport of athletics
- FISU World University Games
- University and college sport
