= Anita Howard =

American sprinter (born 1969)

Personal information
- National team: United States
- Born: Anita Ann Howard; March 22, 1969 (age 57) Augusta, Georgia, United States

Sport
- Sport: Track and field
- Event: 400 meters
- College team: University of Florida
- Club: Quicksilver Track Club
Medal record
Women's track and field
Representing United States
World Indoor Championships
Silver medal – second place	1997 Paris	4 × 400 m relay
Pan American Games
Bronze medal – third place	1991 Havana	4 x 100 m relay
Summer Universiade
Gold medal – first place	1989 Duisburg	4 x 100 m relay
Gold medal – first place	1991 Sheffield	4 x 100 m relay
Silver medal – second place	1989 Duisburg	100 m
Silver medal – second place	1991 Sheffield	100 m

Anita Ann Howard Prather (born March 22, 1969), née Anita Ann Howard, is a former American track and field athlete who specialized in the 400 meters.

Howard received an athletic scholarship to attend the University of Florida in Gainesville, Florida, where she was a member of the Florida Gators track and field team from 1988 to 1991. She graduated from Florida with a bachelor's degree in psychology in 1993, and was inducted into the University of Florida Athletic Hall of Fame as a "Gator Great" in 2007.

Howard won a silver medal in the 4 × 400 meters relay at the 1997 World Indoor Championships in Paris, together with teammates Shanelle Porter, Natasha Kaiser-Brown and Jearl Miles Clark. The team set a new North American indoor record of 3:27.66 minutes.

Her personal best in the 400 meters was a time of 51.01 seconds, which she ran in Austin, Texas in June 1992.

Anita Howard now works for Lennard Highschool as a HOPE Teacher.

== See also ==
- Florida Gators
- List of University of Florida alumni
- List of University of Florida Athletic Hall of Fame members
- List of University of Florida Olympians
