= Wang Huei-chen =

Taiwanese sprinter

Personal information
- Born: 21 February 1970 (age 56)

Sport
- Sport: Track and field
Medal record
Representing Chinese Taipei
Asian Games
Gold medal – first place	1994 Hiroshima	200 m
Silver medal – second place	1990 Beijing	100 m
Silver medal – second place	1990 Beijing	200 m
Silver medal – second place	1994 Hiroshima	100 m
Asian Championships
Silver medal – second place	1991 Kuala Lumpur	200 m
Silver medal – second place	1993 Manila	4 × 100 m
Bronze medal – third place	1989 New Delhi	100 m
Bronze medal – third place	1991 Kuala Lumpur	100 m
Bronze medal – third place	1993 Manila	100 m
Bronze medal – third place	1993 Manila	200 m
Summer Universiade
Gold medal – first place	1991 Sheffield	200 m
Bronze medal – third place	1993 Buffalo	100 m

Wang Huei-chen (Chinese: 王惠珍; pinyin: Wáng Huì-zhēn; born 21 February 1970) is a former Taiwanese track and field athlete, who specialized in sprinting events. She twice represented her country at the Summer Olympics (1992 and 1996). Wang also competed at three World Championships in Athletics and three IAAF World Indoor Championships (1991, 1993 and 1995).

She was a medalist at three editions of the Asian Athletics Championships and won four medals at the Asian Games during her career, including the 200 metres gold medal at the 1994 Asian Games. She was the 1991 Summer Universiade champion in the 200 m and is a former Asian record holder for the event with her personal best of 22.56 seconds, set in 1992. This time remains Taiwanese record for the 200 m and she also holds the record for the 4 × 100 m relay.

== International competitions ==
Year	Competition	Venue	Position	Event	Notes
Representing Chinese Taipei
1988	World Junior Championships	Sudbury, Canada	35th (h)	100 m	12.12 (wind: +1.3 m/s)
1988	World Junior Championships	Sudbury, Canada	43rd (h)	200 m	25.36 (wind: +1.9 m/s)
1988	World Junior Championships	Sudbury, Canada	15th (h)	4 × 100 m relay	46.59
1989	Asian Championships	New Delhi, India	3rd	100 m	11.84
1989	IAAF World Cup	Barcelona, Spain	9th	100 m	11.97
1990	Asian Games	Beijing, China	2nd	100 m	12.09
1990	Asian Games	Beijing, China	2nd	200 m	23.89
1991	Asian Championships	Kuala Lumpur, Malaysia	3rd	100 m	11.69
1991	Asian Championships	Kuala Lumpur, Malaysia	2nd	200 m	23.44
1991	Universiade	Sheffield, United Kingdom	1st	200 m	23.22
1992	Olympic Games	Barcelona. Spain	18th (qf)	100 m	11.57
1992	Olympic Games	Barcelona. Spain	15th (qf)	200 m	22.93
1993	East Asian Games	Shanghai, China	1st	100 m	11.38
1993	East Asian Games	Shanghai, China	1st	200 m	23.47
1993	Universiade	Buffalo, United States	7th	100 m	11.80
1993	Universiade	Buffalo, United States	3rd	200 m	22.80w
1993	Asian Championships	Manila, Philippines	3rd	100 m	11.60
1993	Asian Championships	Manila, Philippines	3rd	200 m	23.42
1993	Asian Championships	Manila, Philippines	2nd	4 × 100 m	45.12
1994	Asian Games	Hiroshima, Japan	1st	200 m	23.34
1994	Asian Games	Hiroshima, Japan	2nd	100 m	11.41
1994	Asian Games	Hiroshima, Japan	4th	4 × 100 m relay	44.58
1996	Olympic Games	Atlanta, United States	39th (h)	100 m	11.70

== Personal bests ==
Event	Time	Venue	Date
100 m	11.29 sec	Keelung, Taiwan	1991
200 m	22.56 sec	Ilan, Taiwan	1992
