= Esther Jones (athlete) =

American sprinter

Personal information
- Born: April 7, 1969 (age 57) Chicago, Illinois, U.S.
Medal record
Women's athletics
Representing the United States
Olympic Games
Gold medal – first place	1992 Barcelona	4 × 100 m relay
World Cup
Bronze medal – third place	1989 Barcelona	4 × 100 m relay
Universiade
Gold medal – first place	1989 Duisburg	4 × 100 m relay
Bronze medal – third place	1989 Duisburg	200 metres
World Junior Championships
Bronze medal – third place	1988 Sudbury	4 × 100 m relay

Esther Jones (born April 7, 1969) is an American former sprinter who won an Olympic gold medal in the 4 × 100 metres relay in 1992 Barcelona.

Jones was born in Chicago, Illinois, United States and ran track collegiately at Louisiana State University. She finished fourth in both the 100 m and 200 m at the 1988 World Junior Championships in Sudbury and won a bronze medal in the 4 × 100 m relay. She reached the semi-finals of the 200 metres at the 1991 World Championships in Tokyo. At the 1992 Barcelona Olympics, she won a gold medal in the sprint relay, running the second leg. Her teammates were Evelyn Ashford, Carlette Guidry and Gwen Torrence.

Jones' best legal times are 11.11 secs (July 1991) in the 100 metres, set in Rhede, and 22.47 secs (May 1992) in the 200 metres, set in San José. In the 100 m, she also ran a wind-aided 10.99 (+5.2) in Eugene (June 1991) and an 11.09 at altitude in El Paso (April 1994), with no wind gauge.

Her nephew, Trey McKinney-Jones, is a professional basketball player.
