= Chen Ya-li =

Taiwanese sprinter

Personal information
- Nationality: Taiwanese
- Born: 陳 雅莉, Pinyin: Chén Yǎlì; 2 April 1969 (age 57)

Sport
- Sport: Sprinting
- Event: 100 metres
Medal record
Women's athletics
Representing Chinese Taipei
Asian Championships
Bronze medal – third place	1987 Singapore	4×100 m

Chen Ya-li (born 2 April 1969) is a Taiwanese sprinter. She competed in the women's 100 metres at the 1988 Summer Olympics.
