= Karen Clarke (sprinter) =

Canadian sprinter (born 1971)

Personal information
- Born: 7 October 1971 (age 54) Montego Bay, Jamaica

Sport
- Sport: Track and field
Medal record
Representing Canada
Summer Universiade
Bronze medal – third place	1997 Catania	4x100m relay

Karen Alicia Clarke (born 7 October 1971) is a Canadian retired sprinter who specialized in the 100 and 200 metres.

She was born in Montego Bay, Jamaica, but represented the track club Calgary Spartans. At the 1989 Pan American Junior Championships she won the bronze medal in both 100 and 200 metres.

At the 1991 World Championships she competed in both 100 and 200 metres, failing to progress past the heats. Together with Rosey Edeh, Cheryl Allen and Charmaine Crooks she finished sixth in the 4 × 400 metres relay. At the 1992 Summer Olympics she competed without reaching the final at both the 100, 200 and 4 × 400 metres relay.

She also competed in 60 metres without reaching the final at the 1991, 1993 and 1995 World Indoor Championships. Clarke became Canadian 100 metres champion in 1991, 1993 and 1995; and 200 metres champion in 1991, 1992 and 1995.
