= Diana Hill (painter) =

British artist (c. 1760–1844)

Diana Hill (c. 1760–1844) was an English miniaturist. She was born in about 1760 as Diana Dietz and married Haydock Hill in 1781. Hill lived and worked in England and, after her first husband's death, in Calcutta, India. In 1788, she remarried: her husband was Lieutenant Thomas Harriott of the 1st Native Infantry. She returned to England, accompanied by Harriott, in 1806 and died in Twickenham on 10 February 1844. A miniature portrait of her second husband, Lieutenant Thomas Harriott, painted by her in 1791, is held at the Victoria and Albert Museum.
