= 1988 World Junior Championships in Athletics =

International athletics competition

- Host city: Sudbury, Canada
- Nations: 123
- Athletes: 1024
- Events: 41
- Dates: 27–31 July
- Main venue: Laurentian University Stadium

The 1988 World Junior Championships in Athletics was the 1988 edition of the World Junior Championships in Athletics, held in Sudbury, Ontario, Canada from July 27 to July 31, 1988.

== Planning ==
The city's bid to host the games was accepted in 1986, winning over Cali, Colombia. In addition to the International Association of Athletics Federations's concerns about the political instability of Colombia at the time, Sudbury had recently established a strong reputation in sporting circles due to its hosting of the 1980 Pan American Junior Athletics Championships, as well as Alex Baumann's world record performance in swimming at the 1984 Summer Olympics.

Despite this, IAAF president Primo Nebiolo personally opposed the selection, arguing that the city was not large or world-famous enough to be an appropriate host city for the event. Over the next two years, Nebiolo lobbied several times to have the games pulled from the city, in turn causing difficulties for the city in securing sufficient funding from corporate and government sponsors. As late as ten days before the event was to begin, the event still faced a significant budget gap in its broadcasting contracts, with Nebiolo again threatening to pull the games from the city before a last-minute donation from the Canadian Track and Field Association covered the shortfall.

Once the games started, however, Nebiolo was more positive, stating that the games benefited from being held in a smaller centre that was able to provide an athlete-centred experience and had the community spirit to draw on a huge base of volunteers.

The city's Northern Lights Festival Boréal was held concurrently to serve as the championships' cultural festival. CBC Television and MCTV acted as the host broadcasters.

MCTV's screenshot logo that was used in the 1988 World Junior Championships.

Overall, the games contributed approximately $8 million to the city's local economy.

== Results ==
=== Men ===
Event	Gold		Silver		Bronze	
100 metres	Andre Cason; United States	10.22	Sven Matthes; East Germany	10.28	Aleksandr Shlychkov; Soviet Union	10.37
200 metres	Kevin Braunskill; United States	20.87	Olapade Adeniken; Nigeria	20.88	Dmitriy Bartenyev; Soviet Union	20.92
400 metres	Tomasz Jędrusik; Poland	46.19	Steve Perry; Australia	46.74	Anthony Eziuka; Nigeria	46.81
800 metres	Jonah Birir; Kenya	1:50.03	Kevin McKay; Great Britain	1:50.79	Melford Homela; Zimbabwe	1:51.34
1500 metres	Wilfred Kirochi; Kenya	3:46.52	Noureddine Morceli; Algeria	3:46.93	Fermín Cacho; Spain	3:47.31
5000 metres	Henry Kirui; Kenya	13:54.29	Mohamed Choumassi; Morocco	13:54.36	Addis Abebe; Ethiopia	13:58.08
10,000 metres	Addis Abebe; Ethiopia	28:42.13	Bedilu Kibret; Ethiopia	28:48.55	James Songok; Kenya	28:50.42
20 kilometres road run	Metaferia Zeleke; Ethiopia	59:27	Thomas Osano; Kenya	1:00:14	Abel Gisemba; Kenya	1:00:36
110 metres hurdles	Reinaldo Quintero; Cuba	13.71	Steve Brown; United States	13.73	Elbert Ellis; United States	13.78
400 metres hurdles	Kelly Carter; United States	49.50	Mugur Mateescu; Romania	50.70	Vadim Zadoinov; Soviet Union	50.88
3000 metres steeplechase	William Chemitei; Kenya	8:41.61	Matthew Birir; Kenya	8:44.54	Arto Kuusisto; Finland	8:46.42
10,000 metres walk	Alberto Cruz; Mexico	41:16.11	Valentí Massana; Spain	41:33.95	Mikhail Khmelnitskiy; Soviet Union	41:38.86
4 × 100 metres relay	United States; Kevin Braunskill; Quincy Watts; Andre Cason; Terrence Warren	39.27	Nigeria; Abdullah Tetengi; Davidson Ezinwa; Victor Nwankwo; Olapade Adeniken	39.66	United Kingdom; Courtney Rumbolt; Lloyd Stapleton; Darren Braithwaite; Jamie Henderson	40.06
4 × 400 metres relay	United States; Jesse Carr; Chris Nelloms; Jesse Williams; Ralph Carrington	3:05.09	Australia; Anthony Ryan; Mark Garner; Dean Capobianco; Steve Perry	3:07.60	Jamaica; Michael Rose; Carey Johnson; Anthony Pryce; Daniel England	3:08.00
High jump	Artur Partyka; Poland	2.28	Lambros Papakostas; Greece	2.25	Park Jae-Hong; South Korea; Jaroslaw Kotewicz; Poland	2.22
Pole vault	István Bagyula; Hungary	5.65	Maksim Tarasov; Soviet Union	5.60	Andrey Grudinin; Soviet Union	5.30
Long jump	Luis Bueno; Cuba	7.99	Saúl Isalgué; Cuba	7.78	Nai Hui-Fang; Chinese Taipei	7.77
Triple jump	Vladimir Melikhov; Soviet Union	16.69	Galin Georgiev; Bulgaria	16.18	Eugene Greene; Bahamas	16.16
Shot put	Aleksandr Klimenko; Soviet Union	18.92	Mike Stulce; United States	18.47	Aleksandr Klimov; Soviet Union	18.06
Discus throw	Andreas Seelig; East Germany	58.60	Kamy Keshmiri; United States	54.68	Yuriy Nesteryets; Soviet Union	53.70
Hammer throw	Vadim Kolesnik; Soviet Union	69.52	Oleg Polyushik; Soviet Union	69.00	Thomas Hommel; East Germany	66.06
Javelin throw	Vladimir Ovchinnikov; Soviet Union	77.08	Steve Backley; Great Britain	75.40	Jens Reimann; East Germany	71.64
Decathlon	Michael Kohnle; West Germany	7729	Robert Změlík; Czechoslovakia	7659	Eduard Hämäläinen; Soviet Union	7596
WR world record | AR area record | CR championship record | GR games record | NR national record | OR Olympic record | PB personal best | SB season best | WL world leading (in a given season)

=== Women ===
Event	Gold		Silver		Bronze	
100 metres	Diana Dietz; East Germany	11.18	Katrin Krabbe; East Germany	11.23	Liliana Allen; Cuba	11.36
200 metres	Katrin Krabbe; East Germany	22.34	Diana Dietz; East Germany	22.88	Liliana Allen; Cuba	22.97
400 metres	Grit Breuer; East Germany	51.24	Maicel Malone; United States	52.23	Olga Moroz; Soviet Union	53.20
800 metres	Birte Bruhns; East Germany	2:00.67	Catalina Gheorghiu; Romania	2:01.96	Dorota Buczkowska; Poland	2:02.94
1500 metres	Doina Homneac; Romania	4:12.94	Snežana Pajkić; Yugoslavia	4:16.19	Yvonne van der Kolk; Netherlands	4:16.35
3000 metres	Ann Mwangi; Kenya	9:13.99	Fernanda Ribeiro; Portugal	9:15.33	Yvonne Lichtenfeld; East Germany	9:16.02
10,000 metres	Jane Ngotho; Kenya	33:49.45	Olga Nazarkina; Soviet Union	33:50.03	Mónica Gama; Portugal	34:16.13
100 metres hurdles	Aliuska López; Cuba	13.23	Birgit Wolf; West Germany	13.51	Zhanna Gurbanova; Soviet Union	13.64
400 metres hurdles	Antje Axmann; East Germany	57.47	Ann Maenhout; Belgium	57.58	Silvia Rieger; West Germany	57.88
5000 metres walk	Mari Cruz Díaz; Spain	21:51.31	Olga Sánchez; Spain	21:58.17	Maria Grazia Orsani; Italy	22:04.74
4 × 100 metres relay	East Germany; Grit Breuer; Katrin Krabbe; Diana Dietz; Katrin Henke	43.48	Cuba; Eusebia Riquelme; Liliana Allen; Aliuska López; Ana Valdivia	44.04	United States; Angela Burnham; Kendra Mackey; Frenchie Holmes; Esther Jones	44.27
4 × 400 metres relay	East Germany; Manuela Derr; Stefanie Fabert; Anke Wöhlk; Grit Breuer	3:28.39	United States; Keisha Demas; Stephanie Saleem; Kendra Mackey; Teri Smith	3:31.48	Soviet Union; Tatyana Movchan; Viktoria Miloserdova; Olga Burkanova; Olga Moroz	3:31.89
High jump	Galina Astafei; Romania	2.00	Yelena Yelesina; Soviet Union	1.96	Karen Scholz; East Germany	1.92
Long jump	Fiona May; Great Britain	6.88	Anu Kaljurand; Soviet Union	6.78	Jo Wise; Great Britain	6.69
Shot put	Ines Wittich; East Germany	18.54	Heike Rohrmann; East Germany	17.84	Elvira Polyakova; Soviet Union	17.10
Discus throw	Ilke Wyludda; East Germany	68.24	Astrid Kumbernuss; East Germany	64.08	Proletka Voycheva; Bulgaria	58.94
Javelin throw	Karen Forkel; East Germany	61.44	Isel López; Cuba	57.86	Malgorzata Kielczewska; Poland	57.04
Heptathlon	Svetla Dimitrova; Bulgaria	6289	Yelena Petushkova; Soviet Union	6102	Peggy Beer; East Germany	6067
WR world record | AR area record | CR championship record | GR games record | NR national record | OR Olympic record | PB personal best | SB season best | WL world leading (in a given season)

== Medal table ==
Rank	Nation	Gold	Silver	Bronze	Total
1	East Germany	11	5	5	21
2	Kenya	6	2	2	10
3	United States	5	5	2	12
4	Soviet Union	4	6	12	22
5	Cuba	3	3	2	8
6	Romania	2	2	0	4
7	Ethiopia (ETH)	2	1	1	4
8	Poland	2	0	3	5
9	Great Britain	1	2	2	5
10	Spain	1	2	1	4
11	Bulgaria	1	1	1	3
11	West Germany	1	1	1	3
13	Hungary	1	0	0	1
13	Mexico	1	0	0	1
15	Nigeria	0	2	1	3
16	Australia	0	2	0	2
17	Portugal	0	1	1	2
18	Algeria	0	1	0	1
18	Belgium	0	1	0	1
18	Czechoslovakia	0	1	0	1
18	Greece	0	1	0	1
18	Morocco	0	1	0	1
18	Yugoslavia	0	1	0	1
24	Bahamas	0	0	1	1
24	Chinese Taipei	0	0	1	1
24	Finland	0	0	1	1
24	Italy	0	0	1	1
24	Jamaica	0	0	1	1
24	Netherlands	0	0	1	1
24	South Korea	0	0	1	1
24	Zimbabwe	0	0	1	1
Totals (31 entries)		41	41	42	124

== Participation ==
According to an unofficial count through an unofficial result list, 1024 athletes from 123 countries participated in the event. This is in agreement with the official numbers as published.

- Algeria (2)
- American Samoa (1)
- Andorra (1)
- Anguilla (1)
- Antigua and Barbuda (1)
- Argentina (3)
- Aruba (1)
- Australia (43)
- Austria (10)
- Bahamas (6)
- Bahrain (2)
- Bangladesh (1)
- Barbados (1)
- Belgium (13)
- Bermuda (1)
- Bolivia (1)
- Botswana (2)
- Brazil (21)
- British Virgin Islands (1)
- Bulgaria (22)
- Burkina Faso (2)
- Canada (48)
- Cayman Islands (1)
- Chile (2)
- China (20)
- Chinese Taipei (12)
- Colombia (3)
- Congo (1)
- Cook Islands (1)
- Costa Rica (2)
- Côte d'Ivoire (3)
- Cuba (24)
- Cyprus (2)
- Czechoslovakia (11)
- Denmark (2)
- Djibouti (1)
- Dominican Republic (2)
- East Germany (37)
- Ecuador (4)
- Egypt (1)
- El Salvador (1)
- Ethiopia (12)
- Fiji (1)
- Finland (22)
- France (39)
- Gambia (1)
- Ghana (4)
- Great Britain (40)
- Greece (8)
- Guatemala (2)
- Guinea (2)
- Guyana (2)
- Honduras (2)
- Hong Kong (2)
- Hungary (18)
- Iceland (2)
- Ireland (9)
- Israel (2)
- Italy (45)
- Jamaica (15)
- Japan (25)
- Kenya (17)
- Kuwait (2)
- Lebanon (1)
- Liechtenstein (1)
- Madagascar (1)
- Malawi (2)
- Maldives (1)
- Malta (1)
- Mauritania (1)
- Mauritius (2)
- Mexico (8)
- Monaco (1)
- Montserrat (1)
- Morocco (4)
- Nepal (2)
- Netherlands (14)
- Netherlands Antilles (2)
- New Zealand (12)
- Nigeria (10)
- Norway (14)
- Pakistan (2)
- Panama (1)
- Paraguay (2)
- Peru (1)
- Philippines (1)
- Poland (17)
- Portugal (16)
- Puerto Rico (2)
- Qatar (2)
- Romania (16)
- Saint Kitts and Nevis (1)
- Saint Lucia (2)
- Saint Vincent and the Grenadines (2)
- Senegal (3)
- Seychelles (2)
- Sierra Leone (2)
- Singapore (1)
- Somalia (3)
- South Korea (3)
- Soviet Union (60)
- Spain (30)
- Sri Lanka (1)
- Sudan (2)
- Suriname (1)
- Swaziland (1)
- Sweden (16)
- Switzerland (10)
- Tanzania (7)
- Thailand (1)
- Tonga (1)
- Trinidad and Tobago (2)
- Turkey (2)
- Uganda (2)
- United States (75)
- U.S. Virgin Islands (2)
- Vanuatu (1)
- West Germany (47)
- Western Samoa (1)
- Yugoslavia (10)
- Zaire (2)
- Zambia (3)
- Zimbabwe (4)

== See also ==
- 1988 in athletics (track and field)
