= Athletics at the 1985 Summer Universiade – Women's 200 metres =

The women's 200 metres event at the 1985 Summer Universiade was held at the Kobe Universiade Memorial Stadium in Kobe on 31 August and 2 September 1985.

== Medalists ==
Gold	Silver	Bronze
Grace Jackson; Jamaica	Elżbieta Tomczak; Poland	Irina Slyusar; Soviet Union

== Results ==
=== Heats ===
Held on 31 August

Wind:
Heat 1: +2.6 m/s, Heat 3: -4.1 m/s

Rank	Heat	Athlete	Nationality	Time	Notes
1	1	Gwen Torrence	United States	23.25	Q
2	1	Irina Slyusar	Soviet Union	23.29	Q
3	1	Pepa Pavlova	Bulgaria	24.21	Q
4	1	Park Mi-seon	South Korea	24.67	q
5	1	Kerry Johnson	Australia	24.83	q
6	1	Intisar Ali Shaker	Iraq	25.40	
7	1	May Sardouk	Lebanon	26.64	
1	2	Marina Molokova	Soviet Union	23.58	Q
2	2	Marisa Masullo	Italy	24.12	Q
3	2	Rufina Uba	Nigeria	24.26	Q
4	2	Esmie Lawrence	Canada	24.26	q
5	2	Linsey MacDonald	Great Britain	25.32	
6	2	Etsuko Hara	Japan	25.52	
7	2	Sandra Govinden	Mauritius	26.57	
1	3	Grace Jackson	Jamaica	2?.??	Q
2	3	Angela Phipps	Canada	24.10	Q
3	3	Rossella Tarolo	Italy	24.64	Q
4	3	Sharon Stewart	Australia	24.72	q
5	3	Fumiko Ono	Japan	25.74	
6	3	Amie Ndow	Gambia	26.51	
1	4	Elżbieta Tomczak	Poland	22.91	Q
2	4	Brenda Cliette	United States	23.18	Q
3	4	Christa Schumann	Guatemala	24.50	Q, NR
4	4	Guadalupe García	Mexico	25.21	
5	4	Jenny Fuentes	Puerto Rico	25.24	
6	4	Fung S.	Hong Kong	27.64	
7	4	Rosa Melia Sierra	Honduras	29.94	

=== Semifinals ===
Held on 2 September

Wind:
Heat 1: -2.9 m/s, Heat 2: +1.4 m/s

Rank	Heat	Athlete	Nationality	Time	Notes
1	2	Irina Slyusar	Soviet Union	22.59	Q
2	2	Grace Jackson	Jamaica	22.64	Q
3	1	Elżbieta Tomczak	Poland	22.96	Q
4	2	Brenda Cliette	United States	23.01	Q
5	2	Marisa Masullo	Italy	23.08	q
6	1	Marina Molokova	Soviet Union	23.15	Q
7	1	Angela Phipps	Canada	23.48	Q
8	2	Esmie Lawrence	Canada	23.54	q
9	1	Gwen Torrence	United States	23.59	
10	1	Pepa Pavlova	Bulgaria	23.77	
11	2	Sharon Stewart	Australia	24.11	
12	1	Rossella Tarolo	Italy	24.30	
13	2	Park Mi-seon	South Korea	24.40	
14	2	Rufina Uba	Nigeria	24.51	
15	1	Christa Schumann	Guatemala	24.68	
16	1	Kerry Johnson	Australia	25.08	

=== Final ===
Held on 2 September

Wind: -2.3 m/s

Rank	Athlete	Nationality	Time	Notes
1st place, gold medalist(s)	Grace Jackson	Jamaica	22.59	
2nd place, silver medalist(s)	Elżbieta Tomczak	Poland	22.76	
3rd place, bronze medalist(s)	Irina Slyusar	Soviet Union	22.86	
4	Marina Molokova	Soviet Union	23.21	
5	Brenda Cliette	United States	23.31	
6	Marisa Masullo	Italy	23.37	
7	Angela Phipps	Canada	23.79	
8	Esmie Lawrence	Canada	24.05	
