= Athletics at the 1985 Summer Universiade – Women's 100 metres =

The women's 100 metres event at the 1985 Summer Universiade was held at the Kobe Universiade Memorial Stadium in Kobe on 29 and 30 August 1985.

== Medalists ==
Gold	Silver	Bronze
Irina Slyusar; Soviet Union	Anelia Nuneva; Bulgaria	Grace Jackson; Jamaica

== Results ==
=== Heats ===
Held on 29 August

Wind:
Heat 2: -0.2 m/s

Rank	Heat	Athlete	Nationality	Time	Notes
1	1	Irina Slyusar	Soviet Union	11.31	Q
2	2	Grace Jackson	Jamaica	11.35	Q
3	3	Elżbieta Tomczak	Poland	11.44	Q
4	4	Marisa Masullo	Italy	11.47	Q
5	2	Anelia Nuneva	Bulgaria	11.50	Q
6	4?	Rufina Uba	Nigeria	11.52	Q
7	1	Michelle Finn	United States	11.60	Q
8	2	Kathrene Wallace	United States	11.66	Q
8	4	Monika Hirsch	West Germany	11.66	Q
10	3	Pepa Pavlova	Bulgaria	11.67	Q
11	4	Esmie Lawrence	Canada	11.68	q
12	2	Yelena Vinogradova	Soviet Union	11.76	q
12	3	Angela Phipps	Canada	11.76	Q
14	3	Roberta Rabaioli	Italy	11.87	q
15	3	Teresa Rioné	Spain	11.91	q
16	1	Christa Schumann	Guatemala	11.95	Q
17	4	Yoshie Kurata	Japan	12.02	
18	2	Park Mi-seon	South Korea	12.06	
19	2	Kerry Johnson	Australia	12.08	
20	4	Geraldine Shitandayi	Kenya	12.12	
21	3	Etsuko Hara	Japan	12.21	
22	1	Jenny Fuentes	Puerto Rico	12.26	
23	3	Intisar Ali Shaker	Iraq	12.28	
24	1	Guadalupe García	Mexico	12.42	
25	4	Amie Ndow	Gambia	12.63	
26	2	May Sardouk	Lebanon	12.99	
27	1	Fung S.	Hong Kong	13.35	
28	1	Rosa Melia Sierra	Honduras	14.58	

=== Semifinals ===
Held on 30 August

Rank	Heat	Athlete	Nationality	Time	Notes
1	2	Irina Slyusar	Soviet Union	11.11	Q
2	2	Elżbieta Tomczak	Poland	11.32	Q
3	1	Anelia Nuneva	Bulgaria	11.34	Q
4	1	Grace Jackson	Jamaica	11.37	Q
5	2	Michelle Finn	United States	11.48	Q
6	2	Rufina Uba	Nigeria	11.54	q
7	1	Yelena Vinogradova	Soviet Union	11.55	Q
8	1	Marisa Masullo	Italy	11.56	q
9	2	Esmie Lawrence	Canada	11.64	
10	2	Pepa Pavlova	Bulgaria	11.68	
11	1	Kathrene Wallace	United States	11.73	
12	1	Monika Hirsch	West Germany	11.76	
13	2	Roberta Rabaioli	Italy	11.87	
14	1	Angela Phipps	Canada	11.88	
15	1	Christa Schumann	Guatemala	11.92	NR
16	2	Teresa Rioné	Spain	11.97	

=== Final ===
Held on 30 August

Wind: 0.0 m/s

Rank	Athlete	Nationality	Time	Notes
1st place, gold medalist(s)	Irina Slyusar	Soviet Union	11.22	
2nd place, silver medalist(s)	Anelia Nuneva	Bulgaria	11.29	
3rd place, bronze medalist(s)	Grace Jackson	Jamaica	11.35	
4	Elżbieta Tomczak	Poland	11.35	
5	Marisa Masullo	Italy	11.45	
6	Michelle Finn	United States	11.49	
7	Yelena Vinogradova	Soviet Union	11.65	
8	Rufina Uba	Nigeria	11.78	
