= Athletics at the 1985 Summer Universiade – Women's 4 × 100 metres relay =

The women's 4 × 100 metres relay event at the 1985 Summer Universiade was held at the Kobe Universiade Memorial Stadium in Kobe on 4 September 1985.

== Results ==
Rank	Nation	Athletes	Time	Notes
1st place, gold medalist(s)	United States	Kathrene Wallace, Michelle Finn, Brenda Cliette, Gwen Torrence	43.29	
2nd place, silver medalist(s)	Soviet Union	Nadezhda Korshunova, Marina Molokova, Irina Slyusar, Yelena Vinogradova	43.43	
3rd place, bronze medalist(s)	Bulgaria	Silvia Khristova, Anelia Nuneva, Pepa Pavlova, Ginka Zagorcheva	43.57	
4	France	Laurence Bily, Christine Sallaz, Marie-France Mollex, Marie-Françoise Lubeth	44.30	
5	Italy	Roberta Rabaioli, Giuseppina Cirulli, Marisa Masullo, Rossella Tarolo	44.53	
6	Canada	Carol Galloway, Molly Killingbeck, Angela Phipps, Esmie Lawrence	44.75	
7	Japan	Tomoa Kurakake, Yoshie Kurata, Etsuko Hara, Miyuki Taniguchi	45.97	
8	West Germany	Heike Filsinger, Monika Hirsch, Claudia Reidick, Beate Peters	46.59	
