= Athletics at the Friendship Games – Women's 4 × 100 metres relay =

The women's 4 × 100 metres relay event at the Friendship Games was held on 17 August 1984 at the Evžen Rošický Stadium in Prague, Czechoslovakia.

== Results ==
Rank	Nation	Competitors	Time	Notes
1st place, gold medalist(s)	Bulgaria	Pepa Pavlova, Anelia Nuneva, Nadezhda Georgieva, Liliyana Ivanova	42.62	
2nd place, silver medalist(s)	Soviet Union	Lyudmila Kondratyeva, Maia Azarashvili, Svetlana Zhizdrikova, Olga Antonova	42.71	
3rd place, bronze medalist(s)	Czechoslovakia	Eva Murková, Taťána Kocembová, Renata Černochová, Jarmila Kratochvílová	43.21	
4	Poland	Elżbieta Woźniak, Iwona Pakuła, Elżbieta Tomczak, Ewa Kasprzyk	43.43	
	East Germany	Silke Gladisch, Bärbel Wöckel, Ingrid Auerswald, Marlies Göhr	DNF	

== See also ==
- Athletics at the 1984 Summer Olympics – Women's 4 × 100 metres relay
