= 1985 European Cup "A" Final =

These are the full results of the 1985 European Cup "A" Final in athletics which was held on 17 and 18 August 1985 in Moscow, Soviet Union.

== Teams standings ==
Men
| Pos. | Nation | Points |
|---|---|---|
| 1 | Soviet Union | 125 |
| 2 | East Germany | 114 |
| 3 | West Germany | 92 |
| 4 | Great Britain | 90 |
| 5 | Poland | 85 |
| 6 | Italy | 72 |
| 7 | Czechoslovakia | 72 |
| 8 | France | 70 |

Women
| Pos. | Nation | Points |
|---|---|---|
| 1 | Soviet Union | 118 |
| 2 | East Germany | 111 |
| 3 | Great Britain | 67 |
| 4 | Bulgaria | 65 |
| 5 | Czechoslovakia | 62 |
| 6 | Poland | 60 |
| 7 | West Germany | 57 |
| 8 | Italy | 35 |

== Men's results ==
=== 100 metres ===
17 August
Wind: +0.6 m/s

| Rank | Lane | Name | Nationality | Time | Notes | Points |
|---|---|---|---|---|---|---|
| 1 | 1 | Marian Woronin | Poland | 10.14 | | 8 |
| 2 | 5 | Vladimir Muravyov | Soviet Union | 10.22 | | 7 |
| 3 | 4 | Frank Emmelmann | East Germany | 10.33 | | 6 |
| 4 | 6 | Lincoln Asquith | Great Britain | 10.42 | | 5 |
| 5 | 7 | Antoine Richard | France | 10.42 | | 4 |
| 6 | 3 | Antonio Ullo | Italy | 10.46 | | 3 |
| 7 | 2 | Christian Haas | West Germany | 10.47 | | 2 |
| 8 | 8 | Luboš Chochlík | Czechoslovakia | 10.52 | | 1 |

=== 200 metres ===
18 August
Wind: +0.2 m/s

| Rank | Name | Nationality | Time | Notes | Points |
|---|---|---|---|---|---|
| 1 | Frank Emmelmann | East Germany | 20.23 | NR | 8 |
| 2 | Aleksandr Yevgenyev | Soviet Union | 20.42 | | 7 |
| 3 | Ralf Lübke | West Germany | 20.43 | | 6 |
| 4 | Marian Woronin | Poland | 20.50 | | 5 |
| 5 | Carlo Simionato | Italy | 20.58 | | 4 |
| 6 | Daniel Sangouma | France | 20.60 | | 3 |
| 7 | Donovan Reid | Great Britain | 20.67 | | 2 |
| 8 | Petr Břečka | Czechoslovakia | 21.35 | | 1 |

=== 400 metres ===
17 August

| Rank | Name | Nationality | Time | Notes | Points |
|---|---|---|---|---|---|
| 1 | Thomas Schönlebe | East Germany | 44.96 | | 8 |
| 2 | Vladimir Krylov | Soviet Union | 45.22 | | 7 |
| 3 | Derek Redmond | Great Britain | 45.35 | | 6 |
| 4 | Erwin Skamrahl | West Germany | 45.60 | | 5 |
| 5 | Pierfrancesco Pavoni | Italy | 45.71 | | 4 |
| 6 | Jindřich Roun | Czechoslovakia | 46.04 | | 3 |
| 7 | Ryszard Wichrowski | Poland | 46.34 | | 2 |
| 8 | Aldo Canti | France | 46.43 | | 1 |

=== 800 metres ===
18 August

| Rank | Name | Nationality | Time | Notes | Points |
|---|---|---|---|---|---|
| 1 | Tom McKean | Great Britain | 1:49.11 | | 8 |
| 2 | Piotr Piekarski | Poland | 1:49.73 | | 7 |
| 3 | Peter Braun | West Germany | 1:49.79 | | 6 |
| 4 | Philippe Dupont | France | 1:49.96 | | 5 |
| 5 | Viktor Zemlyanskiy | Soviet Union | 1:50.41 | | 4 |
| 6 | Andreas Hauck | East Germany | 1:50.55 | | 3 |
| 7 | Alberto Barsotti | Italy | 1:51.52 | | 2 |
| 8 | Marcel Theer | Czechoslovakia | 1:51.73 | | 1 |

=== 1500 metres ===
17 August

| Rank | Name | Nationality | Time | Notes | Points |
|---|---|---|---|---|---|
| 1 | Steve Cram | Great Britain | 3:43.71 | | 8 |
| 2 | Olaf Beyer | East Germany | 3:44.96 | | 7 |
| 3 | Stefano Mei | Italy | 3:45.14 | | 6 |
| 4 | Igor Lotaryov | Soviet Union | 3:45.16 | | 5 |
| 5 | Ryszard Ostrowski | Poland | 3:45.63 | | 4 |
| 6 | Uwe Becker | West Germany | 3:46.14 | | 3 |
| 7 | Pascal Thiébaut | France | 3:52.52 | | 2 |
| 8 | Ivan Adámek | Czechoslovakia | 3:53.05 | | 1 |

=== 5000 metres ===
18 August

| Rank | Name | Nationality | Time | Notes | Points |
|---|---|---|---|---|---|
| 1 | Alberto Cova | Italy | 14:05.45 | | 8 |
| 2 | Thomas Wessinghage | West Germany | 14:05.72 | | 7 |
| 3 | Steve Harris | Great Britain | 14:06.25 | | 6 |
| 4 | Gennadiy Temnikov | Soviet Union | 14:06.60 | | 5 |
| 5 | Frank Heine | East Germany | 14:06.67 | | 4 |
| 6 | Bogusław Psujek | Poland | 14:08.35 | | 3 |
| 7 | Jean-Louis Prianon | France | 14:11.00 | | 2 |
| 8 | Martin Vrábeľ | Czechoslovakia | 14:20.08 | | 1 |

=== 10,000 metres ===
17 August

| Rank | Name | Nationality | Time | Notes | Points |
|---|---|---|---|---|---|
| 1 | Alberto Cova | Italy | 28:51.46 | | 8 |
| 2 | Werner Schildhauer | East Germany | 28:56.57 | | 7 |
| 3 | Christoph Herle | West Germany | 29:02.92 | | 6 |
| 4 | Martin Vrábeľ | Czechoslovakia | 29:13.85 | | 5 |
| 5 | Pierre Lévisse | France | 29:22.10 | | 4 |
| 6 | Andrey Kuznetsov | Soviet Union | 29:31.58 | | 3 |
| 7 | Mike McLeod | Great Britain | 29:36.42 | | 2 |
| 8 | Antoni Niemczak | Poland | 29:56.39 | | 1 |

=== 110 metres hurdles ===
18 August
Wind: +0.6 m/s

| Rank | Name | Nationality | Time | Notes | Points |
|---|---|---|---|---|---|
| 1 | Sergey Usov | Soviet Union | 13.56 | | 8 |
| 2 | Daniele Fontecchio | Italy | 13.66 | | 7 |
| 3 | Stéphane Caristan | France | 13.67 | | 6 |
| 4 | Wilbert Greaves | Great Britain | 13.74 | | 5 |
| 5 | Romuald Giegiel | Poland | 13.74 | | 4 |
| 6 | Aleš Höffer | Czechoslovakia | 13.87 | | 3 |
| 7 | Michael Radzey | West Germany | 13.87 | | 2 |
| 8 | Jörg Naumann | East Germany | 13.90 | | 1 |

=== 400 metres hurdles ===
17 August

| Rank | Name | Nationality | Time | Notes | Points |
|---|---|---|---|---|---|
| 1 | Harald Schmid | West Germany | 47.85 | =CR | 8 |
| 2 | Aleksandr Vasilyev | Soviet Union | 47.92 | NR | 7 |
| 3 | Mark Holtom | Great Britain | 50.47 | | 6 |
| 4 | Olivier Gui | France | 50.47 | | 5 |
| 5 | Hans-Jürgen Ende | East Germany | 50.62 | | 4 |
| 6 | Stanislav Návesňák | Czechoslovakia | 50.65 | | 3 |
| 7 | Ryszard Stoch | Poland | 50.86 | | 2 |
| 8 | Giorgio Rucli | Italy | 51.50 | | 1 |

=== 3000 metres steeplechase ===
18 August

| Rank | Name | Nationality | Time | Notes | Points |
|---|---|---|---|---|---|
| 1 | Patriz Ilg | Italy | 8:16.14 | | 8 |
| 2 | Bogusław Mamiński | Poland | 8:17.40 | | 7 |
| 3 | Joseph Mahmoud | France | 8:17.95 | | 6 |
| 4 | Ivan Konovalov | Soviet Union | 8:19.38 | | 5 |
| 5 | Colin Reitz | Great Britain | 8:27.27 | | 4 |
| 6 | Hagen Melzer | East Germany | 8:28.56 | | 3 |
| 7 | Francesco Panetta | Italy | 8:31.77 | | 2 |
| 8 | Luboš Gaisl | Czechoslovakia | 8:45.26 | | 1 |

=== 4 × 100 metres relay ===
17 August

| Rank | Nation | Athletes | Time | Note | Points |
|---|---|---|---|---|---|
| 1 | Soviet Union | Andrey Shlyapnikov, Aleksandr Semyonov, Aleksandr Yevgenyev, Vladimir Muravyov | 38.28 | | 8 |
| 2 | East Germany | Heiko Truppel, Steffen Bringmann, Olaf Prenzler, Frank Emmelmann | 38.53 | | 7 |
| 3 | Italy | Antonio Ullo, Carlo Simionato, Domenico Gorla, Stefano Tilli | 38.88 | | 6 |
| 4 | Great Britain | Lincoln Asquith, Donovan Reid, Mike McFarlane, Cameron Sharp | 38.97 | | 5 |
| 5 | West Germany | Gerhard Sewald, Christian Haas, Fritz Heer, Ralf Lübke | 39.06 | | 4 |
| 6 | Poland | Jacek Licznerski, Marian Woronin, Czesław Prądzyński, Zygfryd Swaczyna | 39.15 | | 3 |
| 7 | France | Gilles Quénéhervé, Daniel Sangouma, Antoine Richard, Bruno Marie-Rose | 39.31 | | 2 |
| 8 | Czechoslovakia | Luboš Chochlík, Petr Břečka, Josef Lomický, Jindřich Roun | 40.08 | | 1 |

=== 4 × 400 metres relay ===
18 August

| Rank | Nation | Athletes | Time | Note | Points |
|---|---|---|---|---|---|
| 1 | West Germany | Erwin Skamrahl, Klaus Just, Harald Schmid, Ralf Lübke | 3:00.36 | NR | 8 |
| 2 | East Germany | Guido Lieske, Jens Carlowitz, Mathias Schersing, Thomas Schönlebe | 3:00.48 | | 7 |
| 3 | Great Britain | Alan Slack, Kriss Akabusi, Derek Redmond, Todd Bennett | 3:03.31 | | 6 |
| 4 | Czechoslovakia | Daniel Hejret, Petr Břečka, Dušan Malovec, Jindřich Roun | 3:04.98 | | 5 |
| 5 | Poland | Marek Sira, Ryszard Wichrowski, Ryszard Jaszkowski, Andrzej Stępień | 3:05.08 | | 4 |
| 6 | France | Yann Quentrec, Jean-Jacques Février, Aldo Canti, Olivier Gui | 3:05.21 | | 3 |
| 7 | Italy | Roberto Ribaud, Carlo Simionato, Mauro Zuliani, Pierfrancesco Pavoni | 3:05.22 | | 2 |
| 8 | Soviet Union | Vladimir Prosin, Aleksandr Troshchilo, Aleksandr Kurochkin, Vladimir Krylov | 3:06.46 | | 1 |

=== High jump ===
17 August

| Rank | Name | Nationality | Result | Notes | Points |
|---|---|---|---|---|---|
| 1 | Ján Zvara | Czechoslovakia | 2.29 | | 8 |
| 2 | Gerd Wessig | East Germany | 2.29 | | 7 |
| 3 | Igor Paklin | Soviet Union | 2.26 | | 6 |
| 4 | Carlo Thränhardt | West Germany | 2.23 | | 5 |
| 5 | Jacek Wszoła | Poland | 2.20 | | 4 |
| 6 | Gian Piero Palomba | Italy | 2.15 | | 3 |
| 7 | Floyd Manderson | Great Britain | 2.15 | | 2 |
| 8 | Dominique Hernandez | France | 2.15 | | 1 |

=== Pole vault ===
18 August

| Rank | Name | Nationality | 5.00 | 5.40 | 5.50 | 5.60 | 5.70 | 5.80 | 6.02 | Result | Notes | Points |
|---|---|---|---|---|---|---|---|---|---|---|---|---|
| 1 | Sergey Bubka | Soviet Union | – | – | – | o | – | xo | xxx | 5.80 | | 8 |
| 2 | Philippe Collet | France | – | o | – | xo | xx– | x | | 5.60 | | 7 |
| 3 | Marian Kolasa | Poland | | | | | | | | 5.60 | | 6 |
| 4 | Zdeněk Lubenský | Czechoslovakia | | | | | | | | 5.50 | | 5 |
| 5 | Christoph Pietz | East Germany | | | | | | | | 5.40 | | 4 |
| 6 | Jürgen Winkler | West Germany | | | | | | | | 5.40 | | 3 |
| 7 | Mauro Barella | Italy | | | | | | | | 5.40 | | 2 |
| 8 | Jeff Gutteridge | Great Britain | | | | | | | | 5.00 | | 1 |

=== Long jump ===
17 August

| Rank | Name | Nationality | #1 | #2 | #3 | #4 | #5 | #6 | Result | Notes | Points |
|---|---|---|---|---|---|---|---|---|---|---|---|
| 1 | Sergey Layevskiy | Soviet Union | 8.19 | 8.17 | 8.08 | 8.08 | 7.90 | | 8.19 | | 8 |
| 2 | Jan Leitner | Czechoslovakia | 7.85 | x | 7.79 | 7.80 | 7.93 | 8.00 | 8.00 | | 7 |
| 3 | Uwe Lange | East Germany | 7.78 | 7.80 | 7.78 | 7.96 | x | 7.89 | 7.96 | | 6 |
| 4 | Andrzej Klimaszewski | Poland | 7.90 | x | 7.81 | x | 7.77 | 7.52 | 7.90 | | 5 |
| 5 | Norbert Brige | France | 7.80 | 7.88 | 7.85 | x | x | x | 7.88 | | 4 |
| 6 | Derrick Brown | Great Britain | x | 7.84 | 7.75 | 7.82 | 7.69 | 7.78 | 7.84 | | 3 |
| 7 | Markus Kessler | West Germany | 7.62 | 7.41 | 7.61 | 7.63 | 7.75 | 7.57 | 7.75 | | 2 |
| 8 | Giovanni Evangelisti | Italy | x | 7.65 | x | 7.39 | x | 7.43 | 7.65 | | 1 |

=== Triple jump ===
18 August

| Rank | Name | Nationality | #1 | #2 | #3 | #4 | #5 | #6 | Result | Notes | Points |
|---|---|---|---|---|---|---|---|---|---|---|---|
| 1 | John Herbert | Great Britain | 16.84 | x | 16.92 | 17.39 | – | | 17.39 | CR | 8 |
| 2 | Volker Mai | East Germany | 16.99 | 17.20 | x | 17.26 | 17.02 | 15.20 | 17.26 | | 7 |
| 3 | Oleg Protsenko | Soviet Union | x | x | 16.99 | 16.95 | x | 16.97 | 16.99 | | 6 |
| 4 | Ján Čado | Czechoslovakia | 16.50 | 16.82 | x | x | x | 16.87 | 16.87 | | 5 |
| 5 | Zdzisław Hoffmann | Poland | 16.37w | 16.74w | x | 16.28 | x | 16.00 | 16.74 | | 4 |
| 6 | Ralf Jaros | West Germany | x | 16.67 | x | 16.47 | 16.51 | 16.70 | 16.70 | | 3 |
| 7 | Alain René-Corail | France | 16.49 | – | 15.80 | – | x | x | 16.49 | | 2 |
| 8 | Dario Badinelli | Italy | 16.43 | x | x | x | 16.19 | 14.51 | 16.43 | | 1 |

=== Shot put ===
17 August

| Rank | Name | Nationality | #1 | #2 | #3 | #4 | #5 | #6 | Result | Notes | Points |
|---|---|---|---|---|---|---|---|---|---|---|---|
| 1 | Sergey Smirnov | Soviet Union | 20.85 | 20.33 | x | 22.05 | 21.12 | 21.91 | 22.05 | CR, NR | 8 |
| | Remigius Machura | Czechoslovakia | ~~20.44~~ | ~~20.76~~ | ~~21.38~~ | ~~21.45~~ | ~~21.34~~ | ~~21.36~~ | ~~21.45~~ | DQ | 0 |
| 2 | Alessandro Andrei | Italy | 20.50 | 21.26 | 20.75 | 21.01 | 21.00 | 20.72 | 21.26 | | 7 |
| 3 | Udo Beyer | East Germany | x | 20.49 | 20.41 | x | 20.51 | 20.47 | 20.51 | | 6 |
| 4 | Helmut Krieger | Poland | 18.46 | 18.64 | x | 19.28 | x | x | 19.28 | | 5 |
| 5 | Luc Viudès | France | | | | | | | 19.00 | | 4 |
| 6 | Bernd Kneißler | West Germany | 18.51 | 18.63 | x | 18.67 | x | 18.67 | 18.67 | | 3 |
| 7 | Billy Cole | Great Britain | 17.44 | 18.00 | 18.05 | 18.12 | 18.05 | 18.11 | 18.12 | | 3 |

=== Discus throw ===
18 August

| Rank | Name | Nationality | #1 | #2 | #3 | #4 | #5 | #6 | Result | Notes | Points |
|---|---|---|---|---|---|---|---|---|---|---|---|
| 1 | Imrich Bugar | Czechoslovakia | 63.90 | 64.10 | 65.04 | 64.80 | 66.80 | 64.50 | 66.80 | | 8 |
| 2 | Georgiy Kolnootchenko | Soviet Union | 62.04 | x | 63.74 | 65.60 | 63.12 | 63.68 | 65.60 | | 7 |
| 3 | Dariusz Juzyszyn | Poland | 62.78 | 64.08 | 65.12 | 63.00 | 62.86 | 63.40 | 65.12 | NR | 6 |
| 4 | Jürgen Schult | East Germany | x | 60.42 | 61.08 | 61.10 | 64.00 | 63.00 | 65.12 | | 5 |
| 5 | Alwin Wagner | West Germany | 58.42 | 62.32 | x | 60.78 | 63.10 | x | 63.10 | | 4 |
| 6 | Marco Bucci | Italy | 56.90 | 59.84 | x | 58.42 | 57.30 | 58.20 | 59.84 | | 3 |
| 7 | Paul Mardle | Great Britain | x | 55.74 | 53.56 | 56.52 | 53.50 | 57.42 | 57.42 | | 2 |
| 8 | Patrick Journoud | France | 52.20 | 52.30 | x | 54.62 | 55.68 | 56.98 | 56.98 | | 1 |

=== Hammer throw ===
18 August

| Rank | Name | Nationality | #1 | #2 | #3 | #4 | #5 | #6 | Result | Notes | Points |
|---|---|---|---|---|---|---|---|---|---|---|---|
| 1 | Jüri Tamm | Soviet Union | 77.86 | 82.90 | 82.40 | x | 81.38 | x | 82.90 | CR | 8 |
| 2 | František Vrbka | Czechoslovakia | 71.40 | 70.70 | x | 74.60 | 77.22 | 80.38 | 80.38 | NR | 7 |
| 3 | Matthias Moder | East Germany | x | 76.16 | 76.54 | 77.78 | 76.36 | x | 77.88 | | 6 |
| 4 | Christoph Sahner | West Germany | x | 74.26 | 76.84 | x | x | 75.86 | 76.84 | | 5 |
| 5 | Dave Smith | Great Britain | 72.44 | 71.38 | 70.70 | 73.30 | 72.52 | 74.44 | 74.44 | | 4 |
| 6 | Mariusz Tomaszewski | Poland | 68.52 | 73.40 | 74.02 | 73.26 | 73.98 | 73.02 | 74.02 | | 3 |
| 7 | Walter Ciofani | France | 67.70 | 71.14 | x | 73.12 | x | 72.66 | 73.12 | | 2 |
| 8 | Orlando Bianchini | Italy | 69.76 | 70.24 | 72.74 | 71.16 | x | x | 72.74 | | 1 |

=== Javelin throw ===
17 August – Old model

| Rank | Name | Nationality | #1 | #2 | #3 | #4 | #5 | #6 | Result | Notes | Points |
|---|---|---|---|---|---|---|---|---|---|---|---|
| 1 | Uwe Hohn | East Germany | 92.88 | 91.94 | x | 90.54 | x | x | 92.88 | | 8 |
| 2 | Viktor Yevsyukov | Soviet Union | 76.50 | 88.86 | 81.32 | x | 87.76 | x | 88.86 | | 7 |
| 3 | Zdeněk Adamec | Czechoslovakia | 74.92 | 86.08 | x | 83.06 | x | 84.86 | 86.08 | | 6 |
| 4 | David Ottley | Great Britain | 76.54 | 81.82 | 84.12 | 83.22 | 81.18 | 85.72 | 85.72 | | 5 |
| 5 | Jean-Paul Lakafia | France | 71.44 | 72.52 | 82.98 | 82.90 | x | 80.20 | 82.98 | | 4 |
| 6 | Mirosław Szybowski | Poland | 78.42 | 82.54 | x | x | x | 80.36 | 82.54 | | 3 |
| 7 | Klaus Tafelmeier | West Germany | 77.50 | x | x | 74.42 | x | x | 77.50 | | 2 |
| 8 | Fabio Michielon | Italy | x | x | 68.22 | x | x | x | 68.22 | | 1 |

== Women's results ==
=== 100 metres ===
17 August
Wind: +0.1 m/s

| Rank | Lane | Name | Nationality | Time | Notes | Points |
|---|---|---|---|---|---|---|
| 1 | 4 | Marlies Göhr | East Germany | 10.95 | CR | 8 |
| 2 | 7 | Marina Zhirova | Soviet Union | 10.98 | | 7 |
| 3 | 1 | Anelia Nuneva | Bulgaria | 11.14 | | 6 |
| 4 | 3 | Heidi-Elke Gaugel | West Germany | 11.19 | | 5 |
| 5 | 6 | Elżbieta Tomczak | Poland | 11.21 | | 4 |
| 6 | 5 | Heather Oakes | Great Britain | 11.33 | | 3 |
| 7 | 2 | Marisa Masullo | Italy | 11.49 | | 2 |
| 8 | 8 | Helena Syručková | Czechoslovakia | 11.97 | | 1 |

=== 200 metres ===
18 August
Wind: +0.2 m/s

| Rank | Name | Nationality | Time | Notes | Points |
|---|---|---|---|---|---|
| 1 | Marita Koch | East Germany | 22.02 | | 8 |
| 2 | Elvira Barbashina | Soviet Union | 22.70 | | 7 |
| 3 | Ewa Kasprzyk | Poland | 22.72 | | 6 |
| 4 | Heidi-Elke Gaugel | West Germany | 22.81 | | 5 |
| 5 | Kathy Cook | Great Britain | 22.87 | | 4 |
| 6 | Jarmila Kratochvílová | Czechoslovakia | 22.96 | | 3 |
| 7 | Marisa Masullo | Italy | 23.33 | | 2 |
| 8 | Pepa Pavlova | Bulgaria | 23.58 | | 1 |

=== 400 metres ===
17 August

| Rank | Name | Nationality | Time | Notes | Points |
|---|---|---|---|---|---|
| 1 | Olga Vladykina | Soviet Union | 48.60 | = CR, NR | 8 |
| 2 | Kirsten Emmelmann | East Germany | 50.20 | | 7 |
| 3 | Rositsa Stamenova | Bulgaria | 51.75 | | 6 |
| 4 | Alena Bulířová | Czechoslovakia | 51.92 | | 5 |
| 5 | Erica Rossi | Italy | 52.35 | | 4 |
| 6 | Linda Keough | Great Britain | 52.49 | | 3 |
| 7 | Małgorzata Dunecka | Poland | 52.65 | | 2 |
| 8 | Gisela Kinzel | West Germany | 53.15 | | 1 |

=== 800 metres ===
17 August

| Rank | Name | Nationality | Time | Notes | Points |
|---|---|---|---|---|---|
| 1 | Jarmila Kratochvílová | Czechoslovakia | 1:55.91 | CR | 8 |
| 2 | Nadezhda Olizarenko | Soviet Union | 1:56.63 | | 7 |
| 3 | Christine Wachtel | East Germany | 1:56.71 | | 6 |
| 4 | Kirsty McDermott | Great Britain | 1:57.48 | | 5 |
| 5 | Svobodka Damianova | Bulgaria | 2:00.20 | | 4 |
| 6 | Wanda Wójtowiec | Poland | 2:03.94 | | 3 |
| 7 | Roberta Brunet | Italy | 2:09.41 | | 2 |
| | Margrit Klinger | West Germany | DNF | | 0 |

=== 1500 metres ===
18 August

| Rank | Name | Nationality | Time | Notes | Points |
|---|---|---|---|---|---|
| 1 | Ravilya Agletdinova | Soviet Union | 3:58.40 | CR | 8 |
| 2 | Christina Boxer | Great Britain | 4:02.58 | | 7 |
| 3 | Hildegard Körner | East Germany | 4:03.55 | | 6 |
| 4 | Nikolina Shtereva | Bulgaria | 4:06.26 | | 5 |
| 5 | Milena Strnadová | Czechoslovakia | 4:07.35 | | 4 |
| 6 | Brigitte Kraus | West Germany | 4:08.14 | | 3 |
| 7 | Barbara Klepka | Poland | 4:14.12 | | 2 |
| 8 | Agnese Possamai | Italy | 4:24.66 | | 1 |

=== 3000 metres ===
17 August

| Rank | Name | Nationality | Time | Notes | Points |
|---|---|---|---|---|---|
| 1 | Zola Budd | Great Britain | 8:35.32 | CR, NR | 8 |
| 2 | Zamira Zaytseva | Soviet Union | 8:35.74 | | 7 |
| 3 | Ulrike Bruns | East Germany | 8:36.51 | | 6 |
| 4 | Wanda Panfil | Poland | 8:58.51 | | 5 |
| 5 | Jana Kučeríková | Czechoslovakia | 9:02.88 | | 4 |
| 6 | Vanya Stoyanova | Bulgaria | 9:05.79 | | 3 |
| 7 | Agnese Possamai | Italy | 9:13.16 | | 2 |
| 8 | Birgit Schmidt | West Germany | 9:16.52 | | 1 |

=== 10,000 metres ===
18 August

| Rank | Name | Nationality | Time | Notes | Points |
|---|---|---|---|---|---|
| 1 | Olga Bondarenko | Soviet Union | 31:47.38 | | 8 |
| 2 | Ines Bibernell | East Germany | 32:47.42 | | 7 |
| 3 | Angela Tooby | Great Britain | 33:04.66 | | 6 |
| 4 | Charlotte Teske | West Germany | 33:23.63 | | 5 |
| 5 | Ľudmila Melicherová | Czechoslovakia | 33:55.80 | | 4 |
| 6 | Laura Fogli | Italy | 34:37.72 | | 3 |
| 7 | Renata Kokowska | Poland | 35:22.03 | | 2 |
| 8 | Katya Krasteva | Bulgaria | 35:54.65 | | 1 |

=== 100 metres hurdles ===
18 August
Wind: +1.6 m/s

| Rank | Name | Nationality | Time | Notes | Points |
|---|---|---|---|---|---|
| 1 | Ginka Zagorcheva | Bulgaria | 12.77 | | 8 |
| 2 | Vera Akimova | Soviet Union | 12.80 | | 7 |
| 3 | Cornelia Oschkenat | East Germany | 12.83 | | 6 |
| 4 | Ulrike Denk | West Germany | 12.91 | | 5 |
| 5 | Judy Simpson | Great Britain | 13.09 | | 4 |
| 6 | Jitka Tesárková | Czechoslovakia | 13.53 | | 3 |
| 7 | Sylwia Bednarska | Poland | 13.60 | | 2 |
| 8 | Antonella Bellutti | Italy | 13.96 | | 1 |

=== 400 metres hurdles ===
17 August

| Rank | Name | Nationality | Time | Notes | Points |
|---|---|---|---|---|---|
| 1 | Sabine Busch | East Germany | 54.13 | | 8 |
| 2 | Marina Stepanova | Soviet Union | 54.73 | | 7 |
| 3 | Genowefa Błaszak | Poland | 55.90 | | 6 |
| 4 | Sabine Everts | West Germany | 57.32 | | 5 |
| 5 | Giuseppina Cirulli | Italy | 57.87 | | 4 |
| 6 | Yvette Wray | Great Britain | 58.06 | | 3 |
| 7 | Nadezhda Asenova | Bulgaria | 58.10 | | 2 |
| 8 | Eva Eibnerová | Czechoslovakia | 58.98 | | 1 |

=== 4 × 100 metres relay ===
17 August

| Rank | Nation | Athletes | Time | Note | Points |
|---|---|---|---|---|---|
| 1 | East Germany | Silke Gladisch, Marita Koch, Ingrid Auerswald, Marlies Göhr | 41.65 | CR | 8 |
| 2 | Soviet Union | Antonina Nastoburko, Natalya Pomoshchnikova, Marina Zhirova, Elvira Barbashina | 42.00 | NR | 7 |
| 3 | Poland | Elżbieta Tomczak, Iwona Pakuła, Ewa Pisiewicz, Ewa Kasprzyk | 42.71 | NR | 6 |
| 4 | Great Britain | Jayne Andrews, Joan Baptiste, Sybil Joseph, Heather Oakes | 43.39 | | 5 |
| 5 | West Germany | Resi Marz, Andrea Bersch, Heidi-Elke Gaugel, Ute Thimm | 43.39 | | 4 |
| 6 | Italy | Carla Mercurio, Annarita Balzani, Daniela Ferrian, Marisa Masullo | 44.24 | | 3 |
| 7 | Czechoslovakia | Eva Murková, Emília Danišková, Renata Černochová, Helena Syručková | 45.18 | | 2 |
| 8 | Bulgaria | Krasimira Pencheva, Anelia Nuneva, Pepa Pavlova, Ginka Zagorcheva | 45.18 | | 1 |

=== 4 × 400 metres relay ===
18 August

| Rank | Nation | Athletes | Time | Note | Points |
|---|---|---|---|---|---|
| 1 | Soviet Union | Irina Nazarova, Nadezhda Olizarenko, Maria Pinigina, Olga Vladykina | 3:18.58 | CR, NR | 8 |
| 2 | East Germany | Kirsten Emmelmann, Sabine Busch, Dagmar Neubauer, Petra Müller | 3:20.10 | | 7 |
| 3 | Czechoslovakia | Alena Bulířová, Zuzana Moravčíková, Milena Strnadová, Jarmila Kratochvílová | 3:26.59 | | 6 |
| 4 | Bulgaria | Malena Andonova, Svobodka Damianova, Yordanka Stoyanova, Rositsa Stamenova | 3:28.10 | | 5 |
| 5 | Poland | Ewa Marcinkowska, Jolanta Stalmach, Marzena Wojdecka, Genowefa Błaszak | 3:31.20 | | 4 |
| 6 | West Germany | Ulrike Sommer, Heike Schulte-Mattler, Christiane Brinkmann, Gisela Kinzel | 3:31.51 | | 3 |
| 7 | Great Britain | Linda Keough, Sybil Joseph, Kathy Cook, Gladys Taylor | 3:32.23 | | 2 |
| 8 | Italy | Nicoletta Belloli, Cosetta Campana, Giuseppina Cirulli, Erica Rossi | 3:36.93 | | 1 |

=== High jump ===
18 August

| Rank | Name | Nationality | 1.80 | 1.85 | 1.89 | 1.91 | 1.96 | 1.98 | 2.00 | 2.02 | 2.04 | 2.06 | 2.08 | Result | Notes | Points |
|---|---|---|---|---|---|---|---|---|---|---|---|---|---|---|---|---|
| 1 | Stefka Kostadinova | Bulgaria | – | o | o | o | o | o | o | o | xo | o | xx | 2.06 | CR | 8 |
| 2 | Tamara Bykova | Soviet Union | o | o | o | o | o | o | o | xo | x– | xx | | 2.02 | | 7 |
| 3 | Susanne Helm | East Germany | | | | | | | | | | | | 1.96 | | 6 |
| 4 | Danuta Bułkowska | Poland | | | | | | | | | | | | 1.91 | | 5 |
| 5 | Sara Simeoni | Italy | | | | | | | | | | | | 1.91 | | 4 |
| 6 | Heike Redetzky | West Germany | | | | | | | | | | | | 1.91 | | 3 |
| 7 | Diana Davies | Great Britain | | | | | | | | | | | | 1.85 | | 2 |
| 8 | Jana Brenkusová | Czechoslovakia | | | | | | | | | | | | 1.85 | | 1 |

=== Long jump ===
18 August

| Rank | Name | Nationality | #1 | #2 | #3 | #4 | #5 | #6 | Result | Notes | Points |
|---|---|---|---|---|---|---|---|---|---|---|---|
| 1 | Galina Chistyakova | Soviet Union | 6.94 | 6.93 | 7.06 | 7.20 | 7.28 | 7.09 | 7.28 | | 8 |
| 2 | Heike Drechsler | East Germany | 6.75 | 6.80 | 7.23 | 7.20 | 7.04 | 6.97 | 7.23 | | 7 |
| 3 | Sabine Braun | West Germany | x | 6.22 | 6.52 | 6.33 | x | 6.71 | 6.71 | | 6 |
| 4 | Agata Karczmarek | Poland | 6.38 | x | 6.62 | 6.31 | 6.58 | x | 6.62 | | 5 |
| 5 | Sylvia Khristova | Bulgaria | 6.51 | 6.62 | x | 6.46 | 6.34 | 6.45 | 6.62 | | 4 |
| 6 | Eva Murková | Czechoslovakia | 6.56 | 6.43 | 6.44 | 6.47 | 6.10 | 6.25 | 6.56 | | 3 |
| 7 | Antonella Capriotti | Italy | 6.32 | x | 5.95 | 6.56 | 5.77 | | 6.56 | NR | 2 |
| 8 | Joyce Oladapo | Great Britain | x | 6.21 | x | 6.16 | 6.42 | x | 6.42 | | 1 |

=== Shot put ===
18 August

| Rank | Name | Nationality | #1 | #2 | #3 | #4 | #5 | #6 | Result | Notes | Points |
|---|---|---|---|---|---|---|---|---|---|---|---|
| 1 | Natalya Lisovskaya | Soviet Union | 20.78 | x | 21.10 | 20.51 | 20.05 | 20.49 | 21.10 | | 8 |
| 2 | Helena Fibingerová | Czechoslovakia | 19.48 | 19.62 | 19.86 | x | 19.50 | x | 19.86 | | 7 |
| 3 | Ines Müller | East Germany | 19.03 | 18.59 | x | 19.76 | x | x | 19.76 | | 6 |
| 4 | Judith Oakes | Great Britain | 17.67 | 17.66 | 17.60 | 17.42 | 17.81 | 17.96 | 17.96 | | 5 |
| 5 | Svetla Mitkova | Bulgaria | 17.69 | 17.67 | 17.51 | 17.60 | 17.90 | 17.52 | 17.90 | | 4 |
| 6 | Vera Schmidt | West Germany | 17.16 | 16.43 | 16.21 | 16.69 | 16.11 | 16.68 | 17.16 | | 3 |
| 7 | Concetta Milanese | Italy | x | 15.92 | x | 15.56 | x | 15.66 | 15.92 | | 2 |
| 8 | Bogumiła Suska | Poland | 14.64 | 15.02 | x | 15.01 | x | 14.61 | 15.02 | | 1 |

=== Discus throw ===
17 August

| Rank | Name | Nationality | #1 | #2 | #3 | #4 | #5 | #6 | Result | Notes | Points |
|---|---|---|---|---|---|---|---|---|---|---|---|
| 1 | Galina Savinkova | Soviet Union | x | 59.66 | 70.24 | x | 67.60 | x | 70.24 | | 8 |
| 2 | Martina Opitz | East Germany | x | 67.90 | 68.20 | x | 65.18 | 66.84 | 68.20 | | 7 |
| | Zdeňka Šilhavá | Czechoslovakia | ~~66.42~~ | ~~x~~ | ~~x~~ | ~~64.24~~ | ~~63.42~~ | ~~64.88~~ | ~~66.42~~ | DQ | 0 |
| 3 | Tsvetanka Khristova | Bulgaria | x | x | 62.92 | 62.20 | x | 61.74 | 62.92 | | 6 |
| 4 | Renata Katewicz | Poland | x | 54.68 | 57.24 | x | 54.46 | 56.20 | 57.24 | | 5 |
| 5 | Dagmar Galler | West Germany | 48.96 | 57.12 | x | 55.12 | 55.40 | 56.94 | 57.12 | | 4 |
| 6 | Venissa Head | Great Britain | 51.88 | 50.24 | 51.82 | x | 45.74 | 50.06 | 51.88 | | 3 |
| 7 | Maria Marello | Italy | 50.94 | 50.60 | x | 44.28 | 48.60 | 49.90 | 50.94 | | 2 |

=== Javelin throw ===
17 August – Old model

| Rank | Name | Nationality | #1 | #2 | #3 | #4 | #5 | #6 | Result | Notes | Points |
|---|---|---|---|---|---|---|---|---|---|---|---|
| 1 | Petra Felke | East Germany | 65.44 | 73.20 | 72.94 | 70.80 | 68.88 | 65.66 | 73.20 | | 8 |
| 2 | Fatima Whitbread | Great Britain | 71.90 | 65.86 | 66.52 | x | 67.78 | 68.90 | 71.90 | | 7 |
| 3 | Natalya Kolenchukova | Soviet Union | 54.34 | 63.64 | 65.92 | 61.44 | 56.58 | x | 65.92 | | 6 |
| 4 | Beate Peters | West Germany | 61.96 | 58.76 | 59.42 | x | 60.32 | 63.68 | 63.68 | | 5 |
| 5 | Elena Burgárová | Czechoslovakia | 57.74 | 57.04 | 55.18 | x | 56.96 | 57.02 | 57.74 | | 4 |
| 6 | Genowefa Olejarz | Poland | 55.08 | x | x | 53.22 | 56.92 | 54.04 | 56.92 | | 3 |
| 7 | Ivanka Vancheva | Bulgaria | 48.94 | 52.10 | 52.58 | 54.52 | 52.08 | 53.44 | 54.52 | | 2 |
| 8 | Vilma Vidotto | Italy | x | x | 52.08 | x | x | x | 52.08 | | 1 |
