= 1987 IAAF World Indoor Championships – Women's 200 metres =

The women's 200 metres event at the 1987 IAAF World Indoor Championships was held at the Hoosier Dome in Indianapolis on 6 and 7 March.

== Medalists ==
Gold	Silver	Bronze
Heike Drechsler; East Germany	Merlene Ottey-Page; Jamaica	Grace Jackson; Jamaica

== Results ==
=== Heats ===
The first 2 of each heat (Q) and next 4 fastest (q) qualified for the semifinals.

Rank	Heat	Name	Nationality	Time	Notes
1	1	Heike Drechsler	East Germany	23.21	Q
2	3	Merlene Ottey-Page	Jamaica	23.63	Q
3	3	Mary Onyali	Nigeria	23.77	Q
4	4	Marie-Christine Cazier	United States	23.80	Q
5	4	Angela Phipps	Canada	23.81	Q
6	1	Alice Jackson	United States	23.82	Q
7	2	Els Vader	Netherlands	23.87	Q
8	4	Grace Jackson	Jamaica	24.12	q
9	3	Blanca Lacambra	Spain	24.13	q
10	1	Daniela Ferrian	Italy	24.37	q
11	2	Rufina Ubah	Nigeria	24.71	Q
12	3	Norfalia Carabalí	Colombia	24.85	q
13	4	Cecilia Núñez	Panama	24.89	NR
14	3	Svanhildur Kristjónsdottir	Iceland	25.27	
15	2	Diane Dunrod	Saint Kitts and Nevis	25.28	NR
16	2	Joyce Odhiambo	Kenya	25.30	NR
17	3	Christa Schumann	Guatemala	25.38	NR
18	1	Janet Montas	Dominican Republic	25.91	
19	2	Oliver Acii	Uganda	26.24	NR
20	4	Ana María Luzio	Bolivia	28.92	NR
	2	Anelia Nuneva	Bulgaria	DNF	
	1	Selmi Keamel	Algeria	DNS	
	1	Regina Nigba	Liberia	DNS	
	4	Esther Kavaya	Kenya	DNS	

=== Semifinals ===
First 3 of each semifinal (Q) qualified directly for the final.

Rank	Heat	Name	Nationality	Time	Notes
1	1	Heike Drechsler	East Germany	22.84	Q, PB
2	2	Merlene Ottey-Page	Jamaica	22.86	Q
3	1	Grace Jackson	Jamaica	23.36	Q
4	1	Angela Phipps	Canada	23.49	Q
5	2	Mary Onyali	Nigeria	23.51	Q, AR
6	2	Alice Jackson	United States	23.52	Q, PB
7	1	Marie-Christine Cazier	United States	23.59	
8	2	Els Vader	Netherlands	23.78	
9	2	Daniela Ferrian	Italy	24.09	
10	2	Blanca Lacambra	Spain	24.44	
11	1	Rufina Ubah	Nigeria	24.73	
12	1	Norfalia Carabalí	Colombia	24.76	AR

=== Final ===
Rank	Lane	Name	Nationality	Time	Notes
1st place, gold medalist(s)	4	Heike Drechsler	East Germany	22.27	WR, CR
2nd place, silver medalist(s)	3	Merlene Ottey-Page	Jamaica	22.66	AR
3rd place, bronze medalist(s)	5	Grace Jackson	Jamaica	23.21	
4	6	Alice Jackson	United States	23.55	
5	2	Mary Onyali	Nigeria	23.56	
6	1	Angela Phipps	Canada	23.77	
