= Athletics at the Friendship Games – Women's 100 metres =

The women's 100 metres event at the Friendship Games was held on 16 August 1984 at the Evžen Rošický Stadium in Prague, Czechoslovakia.

== Medalists ==
Gold	Silver	Bronze
Marlies Göhr; East Germany	Lyudmila Kondratyeva; Soviet Union	Anelia Nuneva; Bulgaria

== Results ==
=== Heats ===
Wind:
Heat 1: -0.3 m/s, Heat 2: +0.2 m/s, Heat 3: +0.6

Rank	Heat	Name	Nationality	Time	Notes
1	2	Anelia Nuneva	Bulgaria	11.16	Q
2	2	Lyudmila Kondratyeva	Soviet Union	11.17	Q
3	3	Silke Gladisch	East Germany	11.24	Q
4	2	Ingrid Auerswald	East Germany	11.25	q
5	3	Alice Brown	United States	11.26	Q
6	3	Olga Antonova	Soviet Union	11.32	q
7	1	Marlies Göhr	East Germany	11.40	Q
8	3	Pepa Pavlova	Bulgaria	11.47	qB
9	1	Nadezhda Georgieva	Bulgaria	11.49	Q
10	3	Elżbieta Tomczak	Poland	11.51	qB
11	2	Jayne Andrews	Great Britain	11.56	qB
12	1	Marina Molokova	Soviet Union	11.81	qB
13	2	Iwona Pakuła	Poland	11.82	qB
14	3	Vroni Warthmüller	Switzerland	11.84	qB
15	3	Štěpánka Sokolová	Czechoslovakia	11.88	qB
16	1	Carla Mercurio	Italy	11.90	qB
17	2	Daniela Ferrian	Italy	11.95	
18	2	Grace Pardy	Austria	12.09	
19	1	S. Meas	Cambodia	13.55	
20	3	V. Oum	Cambodia	14.91	

=== "A" Final ===
Wind: -0.2 m/s

Rank	Name	Nationality	Time	Notes
1st place, gold medalist(s)	Marlies Göhr	East Germany	10.95	
2nd place, silver medalist(s)	Lyudmila Kondratyeva	Soviet Union	11.02	
3rd place, bronze medalist(s)	Anelia Nuneva	Bulgaria	11.10	
4	Silke Gladisch	East Germany	11.10	
5	Ingrid Auerswald	East Germany	11.10	
6	Alice Brown	United States	11.21	
7	Nadezhda Georgieva	Bulgaria	11.32	
8	Olga Antonova	Soviet Union	11.33	

=== "B" Final ===
Wind: +0.5 m/s

Rank	Name	Nationality	Time	Notes
1	Pepa Pavlova	Bulgaria	11.47	
2	Jayne Andrews	Great Britain	11.57	
3	Elżbieta Tomczak	Poland	11.64	
4	Iwona Pakuła	Poland	11.81	
5	Carla Mercurio	Italy	11.90	
6	Štěpánka Sokolová	Czechoslovakia	11.92	
7	Vroni Warthmüller	Switzerland	11.99	
	Marina Molokova	Soviet Union	??.??	

== See also ==
- Athletics at the 1984 Summer Olympics – Women's 100 metres
