= 1987 World Championships in Athletics – Women's 100 metres =

These are the official results of the Women's 100 metres event at the 1987 IAAF World Championships in Rome, Italy. There were a total number of 51 participating athletes, with seven qualifying heats and the final held on Sunday 1987-08-30.

== Results ==
=== Final ===
Sunday, 30 August 1987 Wind: -0.5

Rank	Lane	Name	Result	Notes
1st place, gold medalist(s)	6	Silke Gladisch (GDR)	10.90	CR
2nd place, silver medalist(s)	4	Heike Drechsler (GDR)	11.00	
3rd place, bronze medalist(s)	5	Merlene Ottey (JAM)	11.04	
4	2	Diane Williams (USA)	11.07	
5	7	Anelia Nuneva (BUL)	11.09	
6	8	Angela Bailey (CAN)	11.18	
7	1	Pam Marshall (USA)	11.19	
DQ	2	Angella Issajenko (CAN)	~~11.09~~	

=== Semifinals ===
Sunday, 30 August 1987 Wind: Heat 1: +2.2 Heat 2: +0.7

Rank	Heat	Name	Result	Notes
1	1	Silke Gladisch (GDR)	10.82 Q	
2	1	Merlene Ottey (JAM)	10.89 Q	
3	2	Heike Drechsler (GDR)	10.95 Q	
4	1	Angella Issajenko (CAN)	~~10.99~~ DQ	
5	2	Anelia Nuneva (BUL)	11.01 Q	
6	1	Pam Marshall (USA)	11.06 Q	
7	2	Diane Williams (USA)	11.07 Q	
8	2	Angela Bailey (CAN)	11.07 Q	
9	1	Alice Brown (USA)	11.07	
10	1	Nadezhda Georgieva (BUL)	11.10	
11	1	Ulrike Sarvari (FRG)	11.15	
11	2	Natalya Pomoshchnikova (URS)	11.15	
13	2	Nelli Cooman (NED)	11.21	
14	2	Marlies Göhr (GDR)	11.33	
15	1	Irina Slyusar (URS)	11.44	
16	2	Paula Dunn (GBR)	11.59	

=== Quarterfinals ===
Saturday, 29 August 1987 Wind: Heat 1: -0.3 Heat 2: +1.6 Heat 3: -1.6 Heat 4: -1.1

Rank	Heat	Name	Result	Notes
1	2	Angella Issajenko (CAN)	~~10.99~~	DQ
2	1	Heike Drechsler (GDR)	11.08	Q
3	2	Nelli Cooman (NED)	11.14	Q
4	2	Pam Marshall (USA)	11.21	Q
4	3	Diane Williams (USA)	11.21	Q
6	4	Merlene Ottey (JAM)	11.27	Q
7	1	Anelia Nuneva (BUL)	11.29	Q
7	4	Silke Gladisch (GDR)	11.29	Q
9	3	Angela Bailey (CAN)	11.31	Q
10	1	Ulrike Sarvari (FRG)	11.32	Q
11	3	Natalya Pomoshchnikova (URS)	11.33	Q
12	4	Alice Brown (USA)	11.34	Q
13	2	Irina Slyusar (URS)	11.39	q
14	3	Marlies Gohr (GDR)	11.40	q
15	2	Paula Dunn (GBR)	11.47	q
15	4	Nadezhda Georgieva (BUL)	11.47	q
17	3	Laurence Bily (FRA)	11.49	
18	1	Olga Zolotaryova (URS)	11.59	
19	4	Liliana Allen (CUB)	11.60	
20	2	Marisa Masullo (ITA)	11.62	
21	2	Françoise Leroux (FRA)	11.63	
22	4	Pauline Davis (BAH)	11.64	
23	1	Angela Phipps (CAN)	11.67	
24	1	Diane Holden (AUS)	11.68	
25	3	Valya Demireva (BUL)	11.73	
26	2	Sheila de Oliveira (BRA)	11.76	
27	1	Ingrid Verbruggen (BEL)	11.78	
28	3	Simmone Jacobs (GBR)	11.83	
29	3	Yolanda Díaz (ESP)	12.05	
30	4	Amparo Caicedo (COL)	12.08	
31	4	Gisele Ongollo (GAB)	12.21	
–	1	Felicite Bada (BEN)	DNS	

=== Heats ===
Saturday, 29 August 1987 Wind: Heat 1: +2.3 Heat 2: +1.3 Heat 3: +1.0 Heat 4: -0.6 Heat 5: +0.2 Heat 6: +0.7 Heat 7: -0.6

Rank	Heat	Name	Result	Notes
1	1	Heike Drechsler (GDR)	11.02	Q
2	6	Nelli Cooman (NED)	11.18	Q
3	7	Diane Williams (USA)	11.22	Q
4	2	Merlene Ottey (JAM)	11.26	Q
5	1	Nadezhda Georgieva (BUL)	11.27	Q
6	2	Laurence Bily (FRA)	11.32	Q
7	1	Irina Slyusar (URS)	11.34	Q
8	4	Anelia Nuneva (BUL)	11.37	Q
8	5	Ulrike Sarvari (FRG)	11.37	Q
10	2	Natalya Pomoshchnikova (URS)	11.39	Q
11	3	Alice Brown (USA)	11.42	Q
11	5	Silke Gladisch (GDR)	11.42	Q
11	6	Angella Issajenko (CAN)	~~11.42~~	DQ
14	5	Pam Marshall (USA)	11.44	Q
15	7	Marlies Gohr (GDR)	11.47	Q
16	3	Angela Bailey (CAN)	11.52	Q
16	4	Olga Zolotaryova (URS)	11.52	Q
16	7	Paula Dunn (GBR)	11.52	Q
19	2	Diane Holden (AUS)	11.53	Q
20	4	Liliana Allen (CUB)	11.57	Q
21	4	Pauline Davis (BAH)	11.59	Q
22	6	Valya Demireva (BUL)	11.61	Q
23	5	Angela Phipps (CAN)	11.62	Q
23	7	Ingrid Verbruggen (BEL)	11.62	Q
25	1	Marisa Masullo (ITA)	11.71	Q
26	3	Simmone Jacobs (GBR)	11.77	Q
27	2	Sheila de Oliveira (BRA)	11.82	q
28	7	Amparo Caicedo (COL)	11.88	q
29	6	Gisele Ongollo (GAB)	11.89	Q
30	3	Françoise Leroux (FRA)	11.92	Q
31	4	Yolanda Díaz (ESP)	12.00	q
32	1	Felicite Bada (BEN)	12.22	q
33	5	Ng Ka Yee (HKG)	12.26	
34	1	Alyson Caulker (SLE)	12.33	
35	3	Mangalika T.G. Ramani (SRI)	12.34	
35	5	Budi Nurani (INA)	12.34	
37	6	Marie-Ange Wirtz (SEY)	12.64	
38	4	Lea Haba (GUI)	12.78	
39	2	Rosanna Browne (AIA)	12.80	
40	7	Judith Diankolela-Missengue (CGO)	12.84	
41	1	Sara Rossini (SMR)	12.86	
42	7	Martha Soraima (AHO)	12.87	
43	5	Sudani Intisar Othman (JOR)	12.91	
44	1	Erin Tierney (COK)	13.12	
45	6	Judith Robinson (TCA)	13.15	
46	3	Sherlette Barrow (BIZ)	13.21	
46	6	Elise Comlan (TOG)	13.21	
48	2	Lorraine Nanton (MSR)	13.30	
49	3	Denise Ephraim (NRU)	13.69	
50	2	Moutwakil Abdelkarim (SUD)	14.07	
51	7	Jyhan Hassan-Didi (MDV)	15.05	
–	3	Phydia Inamahoro (BUR)	DNS	
–	4	Iammo Launa (PNG)	DNS	
–	4	Aminata Diarra (MLI)	DNS	
–	5	Faouzia Djaffar (COM)	DNS	
–	6	Tina Iheagwam (NGR)	DNS	
