= 1987 IAAF World Indoor Championships – Women's 60 metres =

The women's 60 metres event at the 1987 IAAF World Indoor Championships was held at the Hoosier Dome in Indianapolis on 6 and 7 March.

== Medalists ==
Gold	Silver	Bronze
Nelli Fiere-Cooman; Netherlands	Anelia Nuneva; Bulgaria	Angela Bailey; Canada

Note: Angella Issajenko (CAN) originally won silver but was disqualified in 1989 after admitting long-term drug use.

== Results ==
=== Heats ===
The first 2 of each heat (Q) and next 8 fastest (q) qualified for the semifinals.

Rank	Heat	Name	Nationality	Time	Notes
1	3	Nelli Fiere-Cooman	Netherlands	7.06	Q
~~2~~	3	Angella Issajenko	Canada	~~7.10~~	DQ
2	4	Anelia Nuneva	Bulgaria	7.16	Q
3	1	Angela Bailey	Canada	7.21	Q
4	3	Merlene Ottey-Page	Jamaica	7.27	q
5	1	Juliet Cuthbert	Jamaica	7.28	Q
6	4	Els Vader	Netherlands	7.29	Q
7	3	Michelle Finn	United States	7.30	q
8	2	Wendy Hoyte	Great Britain	7.31	Q
9	2	Diane Holden	Australia	7.37	Q
10	1	Rufina Ubah	Nigeria	7.40	q
11	2	Tina Iheagwam	Nigeria	7.54	q
12	4	Martha Grossenbacher-Derby	Switzerland	7.56	q
13	2	Svanhildur Kristjónsdottir	Iceland	7.67	q
14	1	Christa Schumann	Guatemala	7.72	q, NR
15	2	Diane Dunrod	Saint Kitts and Nevis	7.81	q, NR
16	1	Deborah Bell	Argentina	7.85	NR
17	4	Martha Soraima	Netherlands Antilles	7.89	NR
18	3	Oliver Acii	Uganda	7.98	NR
19	2	Janet Montas	Dominican Republic	8.07	
20	3	Nouha Samaha	Lebanon	8.19	
21	3	Rossella Tarolo	Italy	8.43	
	1	Paula Dunn	Great Britain	DNS	
	1	Ratjai Sripet	Thailand	DNS	
	2	Ruth Gallardo	El Salvador	DNS	
	3	Selmi Keamel	Algeria	DNS	
	4	Regina Nigba	Liberia	DNS	
	4	Joyce Odhiambo	Kenya	DNS	

=== Semifinals ===
First 4 of each semifinal (Q) qualified directly for the final.

Rank	Heat	Name	Nationality	Time	Notes
1	2	Anelia Nuneva	Bulgaria	7.10	Q
2	1	Nelli Fiere-Cooman	Netherlands	7.11	Q
3	1	Merlene Ottey-Page	Jamaica	7.14	Q, NR
~~4~~	2	Angella Issajenko	Canada	~~7.15~~	DQ
4	1	Angela Bailey	Canada	7.17	Q
5	1	Michelle Finn	United States	7.21	Q
6	2	Els Vader	Netherlands	7.28	Q
7	2	Diane Holden	Australia	7.32	Q, AR
8	1	Wendy Hoyte	Great Britain	7.33	
9	2	Rufina Ubah	Nigeria	7.39	
10	2	Juliet Cuthbert	Jamaica	7.48	
11	1	Martha Grossenbacher-Derby	Switzerland	7.54	
12	1	Tina Iheagwam	Nigeria	7.62	
13	2	Svanhildur Kristjónsdottir	Iceland	7.76	
14	2	Christa Schumann	Guatemala	7.79	
	1	Diane Dunrod	Saint Kitts and Nevis	DNS	

=== Final ===
Rank	Lane	Name	Nationality	Time	Notes
1st place, gold medalist(s)	4	Nelli Fiere-Cooman	Netherlands	7.08	CR
2nd place, silver medalist(s)	5	Anelia Nuneva	Bulgaria	7.10	
3rd place, bronze medalist(s)	2	Angela Bailey	Canada	7.12	PB
4	3	Merlene Ottey-Page	Jamaica	7.13	NR
5	1	Michelle Finn	United States	7.19	PB
6	7	Els Vader	Netherlands	7.23	
7	8	Diane Holden	Australia	7.43	
	6	Angella Issajenko	Canada	~~7.08~~	DQ
