= 1985 European Athletics Indoor Championships – Women's 60 metres =

The women's 60 metres event at the 1985 European Athletics Indoor Championships was held on 3 March.

== Medalists ==
| Gold | Silver | Bronze |
|---|---|---|
| Nelli Cooman; Netherlands | Marlies Göhr; East Germany | Heather Oakes; Great Britain |

== Results ==
=== Heats ===
First 2 from each heat (Q) and the next 4 fastest (q) qualified for the semifinals.

| Rank | Heat | Name | Nationality | Time | Notes |
|---|---|---|---|---|---|
| 1 | 3 | Nelli Cooman | Netherlands | 7.21 | Q |
| 2 | 2 | Els Vader | Netherlands | 7.25 | Q |
| 3 | 1 | Marlies Göhr | East Germany | 7.28 | Q |
| 4 | 2 | Silke Gladisch | East Germany | 7.30 | Q |
| 4 | 4 | Heather Oakes | Great Britain | 7.30 | Q |
| 6 | 1 | Elżbieta Tomczak | Poland | 7.38 | Q |
| 7 | 3 | Eva Murková | Czechoslovakia | 7.40 | Q |
| 8 | 4 | Krasimira Pencheva | Bulgaria | 7.40 | Q |
| 9 | 1 | Christelle Bulteau | France | 7.44 | q |
| 10 | 4 | Teresa Rioné | Spain | 7.47 | q |
| 11 | 3 | Lourdes Valdor | Spain | 7.48 | q |
| 12 | 2 | Daniela Ferrian | Italy | 7.49 | q |
| 13 | 2 | Resi März | West Germany | 7.51 | |
| 14 | 1 | Sølvi Olsen | Norway | 7.64 | |
| 15 | 1 | Maria Virginia Gomes | Portugal | 7.65 | |
| 16 | 1 | Maroula Lambrou-Teloni | Cyprus | 7.69 | |
| 16 | 2 | Maria Fernström | Sweden | 7.69 | |
| | 3 | Saša Kranjc | Yugoslavia | DNS | |
| | 4 | Sabine Seitl | Austria | DNS | |

=== Semifinals ===
First 3 from each semifinal qualified directly (Q) for the final.

| Rank | Heat | Name | Nationality | Time | Notes |
|---|---|---|---|---|---|
| 1 | 2 | Nelli Cooman | Netherlands | 7.17 | Q |
| 2 | 1 | Marlies Göhr | East Germany | 7.18 | Q |
| 3 | 2 | Silke Gladisch | East Germany | 7.20 | Q |
| 4 | 1 | Els Vader | Netherlands | 7.25 | Q |
| 5 | 1 | Heather Oakes | Great Britain | 7.27 | Q |
| 6 | 2 | Elżbieta Tomczak | Poland | 7.30 | Q |
| 7 | 2 | Eva Murková | Czechoslovakia | 7.32 | |
| 8 | 1 | Krasimira Pencheva | Bulgaria | 7.33 | |
| 9 | 2 | Christelle Bulteau | France | 7.37 | |
| 10 | 1 | Teresa Rioné | Spain | 7.40 | |
| 11 | 1 | Daniela Ferrian | Italy | 7.42 | |
| 12 | 2 | Lourdes Valdor | Spain | 7.51 | |

=== Final ===
| Rank | Lane | Name | Nationality | Time | Notes |
|---|---|---|---|---|---|
| 1st place, gold medalist(s) | 3 | Nelli Cooman | Netherlands | 7.10 | |
| 2nd place, silver medalist(s) | 4 | Marlies Göhr | East Germany | 7.13 | |
| 3rd place, bronze medalist(s) | 5 | Heather Oakes | Great Britain | 7.22 | |
| 4 | 2 | Silke Gladisch | East Germany | 7.24 | |
| 5 | 1 | Els Vader | Netherlands | 7.25 | |
| 6 | 6 | Elżbieta Tomczak | Poland | 7.30 | |
