= Park Mi-seon =

Park Mi-seon may refer to:

- Park Mi-seon (athlete) (born 1964), South Korean sprinter
- Park Mi-sun (born 1967), South Korean comedian
- Park Si-yeon (born Park Mi-seon, 1979), South Korean actress

== See also ==
- Park (Korean surname)
- Mi-sun, Korean given name also spelled Mi-seon
- Park Seon-mi (born 1982), South Korean field hockey player
