= 1986 USA Outdoor Track and Field Championships =

- Dates: June 20–21
- Host city: Eugene, Oregon, United States
- Venue: Hayward Field

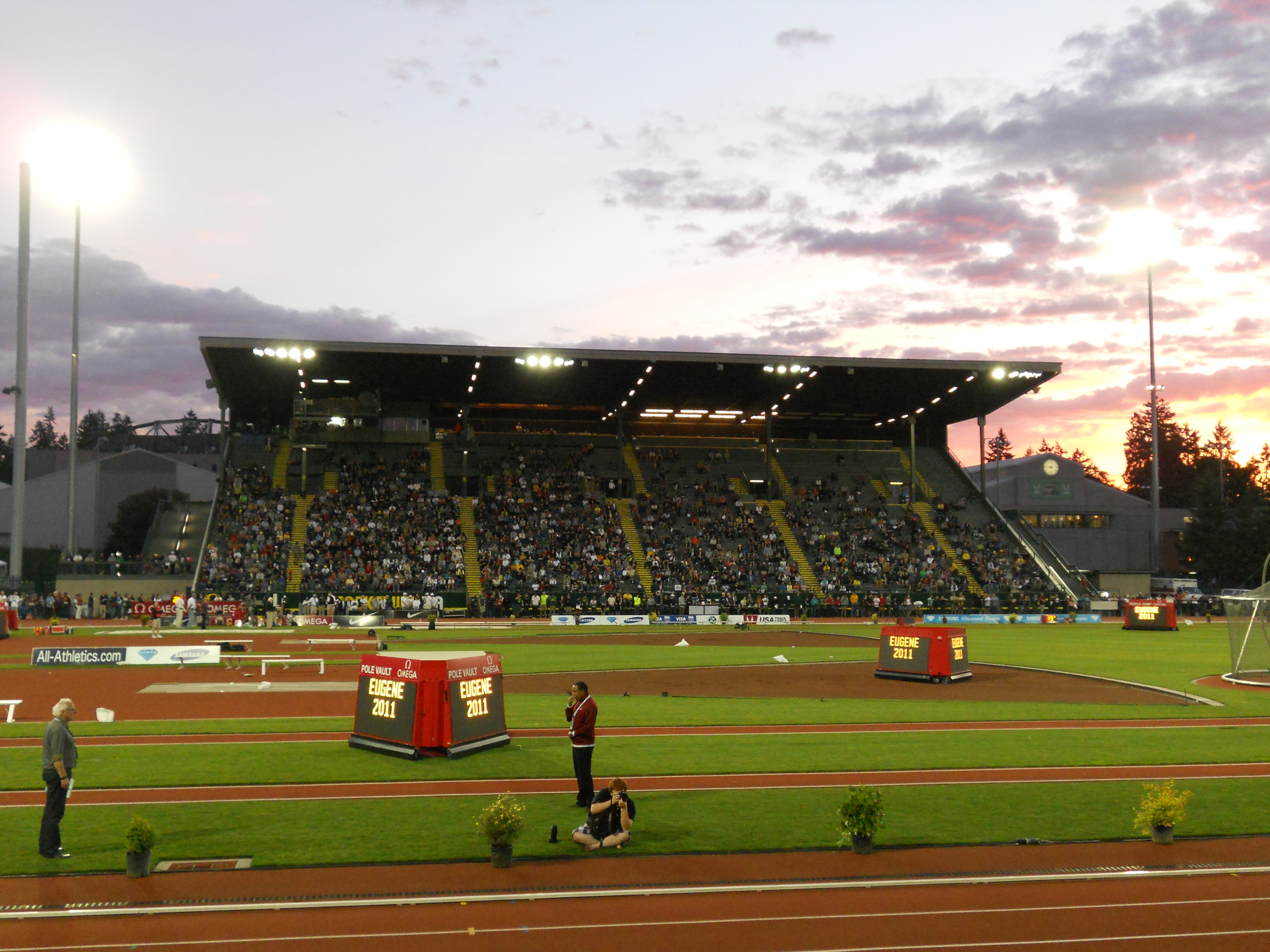

The 1986 USA Outdoor Track and Field Championships took place between June 20–21 at Hayward Field on the campus of University of Oregon in Eugene, Oregon. The meet was organized by The Athletics Congress.

== Results ==
=== Men track events ===
Event	Gold		Silver		Bronze			
100 meters (+4.5 m/s)	Carl Lewis	9.91w	Lee McRae	10.02w	Harvey Glance	10.04w		
200 meters (+3.2 m/s)	Floyd Heard	20.03w	Dwayne Evans	20.12w	Kirk Baptiste	20.14w		
400 meters	Darrell Robinson	44.47	Roddie Haley	44.5	Walter McCoy	45.07	Kenneth Buey	HSNat.alt
800 meters	Johnny Gray	1:44.73	Stanley Redwine	1:45.86	James Robinson	1:46.12		
1500 meters	Steve Scott	3:42.41	Jim Spivey	3:42.99	Dub Myers	3:43.20		
5000 meters	Doug Padilla	13:46.7	Terry Brahm	13:47.5	Don Clary	13:47.8		
10,000 meters	Gerard Donakowski	28:21.11	Mark Nenow	28:22.13	Ed Eyestone	28:33.10		
110 meters hurdles (+1.6 m/s)	Greg Foster	13.29w	Keith Talley	13.48w	Jack Pierce	13.56w	Russell Marrs	HSNat.alt
400 meters hurdles	Danny Harris	48.90	David Patrick	48.90	Kevin Young	49.38	Dexter Bell	HSNat.alt
3000 meters steeplechase	Henry Marsh	8:19.16	Jim Cooper	8:19.88	Farley Gerber	8:20.07		
20 kilometres race walk	Tim Lewis	1:25:22	Carl Schueler	1:25:45	Ray Sharp	1:26:46		

=== Men field events ===
Event	Gold		Silver		Bronze			
High jump	Doug Nordquist	2.33 m (7 ft 7 1/2 in) CR	Jim Howard	2.33 m (7 ft 7 1/2 in) =CR	Greg Jones	2.30 m (7 ft 6 1/2 in)	Daniel Unverzadt	HSNat.alt.
Pole vault	Mike Tully	5.80 m (19 ft 1/4 in) =CR	Earl Bell	5.70 m (18 ft 8 1/4 in)	Joe Dial	5.70 m (18 ft 8 1/4 in)		
Long jump	Carl Lewis	8.67 m (28 ft 5 1/4 in)w	Mike Conley	8.63 m (28 ft 3 3/4 in)w	Larry Myricks	8.47 m (27 ft 9 1/4 in)w		
Triple jump	Charlie Simpkins	17.91 m (58 ft 9 in)w	Mike Conley	17.84 m (58 ft 6 1/4 in)w	Willie Banks	17.52 m (57 ft 5 3/4 in)w		
Shot put	John Brenner	21.09 m (69 ft 2 1/4 in)	Gregg Tafralis	20.89 m (68 ft 6 1/4 in)	Jim Doehring	20.24 m (66 ft 4 3/4 in)		
Discus throw	John Powell	65.94 m (216 ft 4 in)	Rick Meyer	65.86 m (216 ft 0 in)	Mike Buncic	64.72 m (212 ft 4 in)		
Hammer throw	Bill Green	76.20 m (250 ft 0 in)	Jud Logan	74.30 m (243 ft 9 in)	Lance Deal	74.30 m (243 ft 9 in)		
Javelin throw	Tom Petranoff	76.32 m (250 ft 4 in)	Bob Roggy	76.00 m (249 ft 4 in)	Brian Crouser	75.08 m (246 ft 3 in)		
Decathlon	Dave Johnson	8203w	Steve Erickson	8030	Gary Kinder	7857	Russell Marrs	HSNat.alt

=== Women track events ===
Event	Gold		Silver		Bronze	
100 meters (+2.9 m/s)	Pam Marshall	10.85w	Alice Brown	10.85w	Evelyn Ashford	10.85w
200 meters (+2.5 m/s)	Pam Marshall	22.24w	Randy Givens	22.70w	Gwen Torrence	23.01w
400 meters	Diane Dixon	50.41	Lillie Leatherwood	51.29	Brenda Cliette	51.82
800 meters	Claudette Groenendaal	1:59.79	Delisa Floyd	2:00.00	Joetta Clark	2:00.32
1500 meters	Linda Sheskey	4:08.00	Chris Gregorek	4:08.02	Sue Addison	4:08.75
3000 meters	Mary Knisely	8:46.18	Cindy Bremser	8:46.56	PattiSue Plumer	8:52.27
5000 meters	Betty Jo Geiger	15:30.99	Lorraine Moller (New Zealand)	15:32.90	PattiSue Plumer	15:35.00
10,000 meters	Nan Davis	32:29.68	Lynn Nelson	32:30.24	Marty Cooksey	32:34.73
100 meters hurdles (+2.5 m/s)	Benita Fitzgerald-Brown	12.83w	Stephanie Hightower	12.90w	Pam Page & Rosalind Council	tie 12.91w
400 meters hurdles	Judi Brown-King	55.46	Sandra Farmer (Jamaica)	56.25	Schowonda Williams	56.48
10,000 meters racewalk	Debbi Lawrence	50:28.9	Teresa Vaill	50:55.8	Susan Liers	51:29.9

=== Women field events ===
Event	Gold		Silver		Bronze	
High jump	Louise Ritter	1.93 m (6 ft 3 3/4 in)	Jan Wohlschlag	1.93 m (6 ft 3 3/4 in)	Camille Jampolsky	1.90 m (6 ft 2 3/4 in)
Long jump	Carol Lewis	6.93 m (22 ft 8 3/4 in)	Sheila Echols	6.89 m (22 ft 7 1/4 in)w	Jodi Anderson	6.67 m (21 ft 10 1/2 in)w
Triple jump	Wendy Brown	13.78 m (45 ft 2 1/2 in)w	Sheila Hudson	13.41 m (43 ft 11 3/4 in)w	Yvette Bates	13.08 m (42 ft 10 3/4 in)
Shot put	Ramona Pagel	18.63 m (61 ft 1 1/4 in)	Bonnie Dasse	18.15 m (59 ft 6 1/2 in)	Carol Cady	16.88 m (55 ft 4 1/2 in)
Discus throw	Carol Cady	62.71 m (205 ft 8 in)	Ramona Pagel	58.54 m (192 ft 0 in)	Pia Iacovo	57.10 m (187 ft 4 in)
Javelin throw	Helena Uusitalo (Finland)	58.44 m (191 ft 8 in)	Donna Mayhew	56.00 m (183 ft 8 in)	Karyn Szarkowski	55.72 m (182 ft 9 in)
Heptathlon	Jane Frederick	6230	Cindy Greiner	6208	Jolanda Jones	5692

== See also ==
- United States Olympic Trials (track and field)
