= 1987 World Championships in Athletics – Women's 4 × 100 metres relay =

The 4 × 100 metres relay at the 1987 World Championships in Athletics was held at the Stadio Olimpico on September 5 and September 6.

== Medals ==
| Gold | Silver | Bronze |
|---|---|---|
| United States; Alice Brown; Diane Williams; Florence Griffith; Pam Marshall | East Germany; Silke Gladisch; Cornelia Oschkenat; Kerstin Behrendt; Marlies Göhr | Soviet Union; Irina Slyusar; Natalya Pomoshchnikova; Natalya German; Olga Antonova |

== Results ==
All times shown are in seconds.

AR area record | CR championship record | GR games record | NR national record | OR Olympic record | PB personal best | SB season best | WL world leading (in a given season)
DNS = did not start | DQ = disqualification | NM = no mark (i.e. no valid result) | Q = qualification by place in heat | q = qualification by overall place

=== Final ===
| Rank | Team | Athletes | Results | Notes |
|---|---|---|---|---|
| 1st place, gold medalist(s) | United States | Alice Brown, Diane Williams, Florence Griffith, Pam Marshall | 41.58 | CR |
| 2nd place, silver medalist(s) | East Germany | Silke Gladisch, Cornelia Oschkenat, Kerstin Behrendt, Marlies Göhr | 41.95 | |
| 3rd place, bronze medalist(s) | Soviet Union | Irina Slyusar, Natalya Pomoshchnikova, Natalya German, Olga Antonova | 42.33 | |
| 4 | Bulgaria | Ginka Zagorcheva, Anelia Nuneva, Nadezhda Georgieva, Valya Demireva | 42.71 | |
| 5 | West Germany | Silke-Beate Knoll, Ulrike Sarvari, Andrea Thomas, Ute Thimm | 43.20 | |
| 6 | Canada | Angela Bailey, Angela Phipps, Angella Issajenko, Keturah Anderson | 43.26 | |
| 7 | Cuba | Eusebia Riquelme, Aliuska López, Susana Armenteros, Liliana Allen | 43.66 | |
| 8 | France | Françoise Leroux, Marie-Christine Cazier, Laurence Bily, Muriel Leroy | 43.75 | |

=== Heats ===
==== Heat 1 ====
| Rank | Team | Name | Result | Notes |
|---|---|---|---|---|
| 1 | East Germany | Silke Gladisch, Cornelia Oschkenat, Kerstin Behrendt, Marlies Göhr | 42.96 | Q |
| 2 | Canada | Angela Bailey, Angela Phipps, Angella Issajenko, Keturah Anderson | 43.30 | Q |
| 3 | West Germany | Silke-Beate Knoll, Ulrike Sarvari, Andrea Thomas, Ute Thimm | 43.32 | Q |
| 4 | Bulgaria | Ginka Zagorcheva, Anelia Nuneva, Nadezhda Georgieva, Valya Demireva | 43.50 | q |
| 5 | Nigeria | Beatrice Utondu, Tina Iheagwam, Mary Onyali, Falilat Ogunkoya | 43.95 | |
| 6 | Ghana | Mercy Addy, Diana Yankey, Cynthia Quartey, Martha Appiah | 44.28 | |
| — | Brazil | Ines Ribeiro, Claudilea Dos Santos, Sheila De Oliveira, Cleide Amaral | DNS | |

==== Heat 2 ====
| Rank | Team | Name | Result | Notes |
|---|---|---|---|---|
| 1 | United States | Alice Brown, Diane Williams, Florence Griffith, Pam Marshall | 41.96 | Q |
| 2 | Soviet Union | Irina Slyusar, Natalya Pomoshchnikova, Natalya German, Olga Antonova | 42.47 | Q |
| 3 | Cuba | Eusebia Riquelme, Aliuska López, Susana Armenteros, Liliana Allen | 43.53 | Q |
| 4 | France | Françoise Leroux, Marie-Christine Cazier, Laurence Bily, Muriel Leroy | 43.59 | q |
| 5 | Great Britain | Eleanor Cohen, Joan Baptiste, Wendy Hoyte, Paula Dunn | 44.21 | |
| 6 | Italy | Rita Angotzi, Patrizia Lombardo, Annarita Balzani, Marisa Masullo | 44.49 | |
| 7 | India | Ashwini Nachappa, Vandana Shanbag, Sany Joseph, Vandana Rao | 46.32 | |
