= Mi Son =

Mi Son may refer to

- Mỹ Sơn or Mi Son, cluster of abandoned Hindu temples located in what is today Central Vietnam
- Mi Son, 2001 album by Mexican American singer Rick Trevino
- "Mi Son", 1980s song by Puerto Rico singer José Vega Santana for the band Haciendo Punto en Otro Son

== See also ==
- Mison, commune in the Alpes-de-Haute-Provence department in southeastern France
- Mi-sun, Korean given name also romanised Misŏn
- Mi son mi son, 1999 album by Cuban group Conjunto Chappottín
