= Elżbieta Tomczak =

Polish sprinter

Personal information
- Born: 7 January 1961 (age 65) Poznań, Poland
- Height: 1.72 m (5 ft 8 in)

Sport
- Sport: Athletics
- Events: 100 metres, 200 metres
- Club: Olimpia Poznań
Medal record
Representing Poland
Summer Universiade
Silver medal – second place	1985 Kobe	200 metres

Elżbieta Tomczak (born 7 January 1961) is a retired Polish sprinter. She won the silver medal in the 200 metres at the 1985 Summer Universiade in Kobe, Japan.

== International competitions ==
Year	Competition	Venue	Position	Event	Notes
Representing Poland
1984	Friendship Games	Prague, Czechoslovakia	3d (B)	100 m	11.64
1984	Friendship Games	Prague, Czechoslovakia	4th	4 × 100 m relay	43.43
1985	European Indoor Championships	Piraeus, Greece	6th	60 m	7.30
1985	European Cup "A" Final	Moscow, Soviet Union	5th	100 m	11.21
1985	European Cup "A" Final	Moscow, Soviet Union	3rd	4 × 100 m relay	42.71
1985	Universiade	Kobe, Japan	4th	100 m	11.35
1985	Universiade	Kobe, Japan	2nd	200 m	22.76

== Personal bests ==
Outdoor

- 100 metres – 11.18 (+1.7 m/s, Lublin 1984)
- 200 metres – 22.76 (-2.3 m/s, Kobe 1985)

Indoor

- 60 metres – 7.24 (Zabrze 1985)
- 200 metres – 23.25 (Stuttgart 1985)
