= Irina Slyusar =

Ukrainian sprinter (born 1963)

Personal information
- Born: 19 March 1963 (age 63) Dniprodzerzhynsk, Soviet Union

Sport
- Sport: Track and field
Medal record
Representing Soviet Union
World Championships
Bronze medal – third place	1987 Rome	4×100 m relay
European Championships
Bronze medal – third place	1986 Stuttgart	4×100 m relay
Summer Universiade
Gold medal – first place	1985 Kobe	100 m
Silver medal – second place	1985 Kobe	4 x 100 m relay
Silver medal – second place	1987 Zagreb	4 x 100 m relay
Silver medal – second place	1987 Zagreb	100 m
Bronze medal – third place	1985 Kobe	200 m
Goodwill Games
Silver medal – second place	1986 Moscow	4×100 m relay
Representing Ukraine
Goodwill Games
Bronze medal – third place	1994 Saint Petersburg	4 x 100 metres
European Cup
Gold medal – first place	1994 Birmingham	4 x 100 metres

Irina Slyusar (Ukrainian: Ірина Слюсар; born 19 March 1963) is a Soviet Ukrainian former track and field sprinter. She represented the Soviet Union at the World Championships in Athletics in 1987 and 1991 – she was a relay bronze medallist on her debut, but was disqualified for doping on her second appearance. She was twice Soviet national champion in the 100 metres.

Slyusar was the Universiade 100 m champion in 1985 and won four further sprint medals at the competition in the following two years. She competed at the European Athletics Championships for the Soviet Union in 1986 (running the heats for their bronze medal-winning team) and also for Ukraine at the 1994 edition (helping the new nation to fourth in the relay with her twin sister Antonina Slyusar).

== Career ==
Born in Dniprodzerzhynsk, Ukrainian SSR, she first came to prominence at the age of 21 when she won the 100 metres title at the Soviet Athletics Championships in 1984 (shared in a dead heat with Natalya Pomoshchnikova). Her first international title followed the next year, as she won the 100 m gold medal at the 1985 Universiade. She won a medal of each colour at that tournament, through a 200 metres bronze and a 4×100 metres relay silver medal. Her 100 m winning time of 11.11 ranked her in the top ten athletes in the world for the distance that year.

Slyusar won two national titles in 1986: first she recorded 7.22 seconds to win the 60 metres at the Soviet Indoor Athletics Championships, then she had her second career win in the 100 m at the national outdoor championships. She made two appearances at international competitions that year. First she ran at the Goodwill Games in Moscow (a major sports encounter between the Soviet Union and United States during the Cold War period) she placed fifth in the individual 100 m then teamed up with Olga Zolotaryova, Maia Azarashvili and Elvira Barbashina to claim the 4 × 100 m relay silver medal behind the American women. A month later she represented the Soviet Union at the 1986 European Athletics Championships. She was a 100 m semi-finalist and was the relay alternate, helping her nation through the heats alongside Zolotaryova, Antonina Nastoburko and Natalya Bochina, before being switched for Marina Zhirova for the final, where the Soviet Union claimed the bronze medal.

At the 1987 Universiade she returned to defend her 100 m title but was beaten into second place by American Gwen Torrence. The American women also got the better of the Soviet team in the Universiade relay that year. Slyusar made her senior global debut at the 1987 World Championships in Athletics and was selected for both the individual and relay events. In the 100 m she was among the fastest qualifiers in the first round, but gradually weakened as the event progressed and was eighth in her semi-final.

She had 100 m season's bests of 11.17 in 1990 then 11.26 seconds in 1991. The 1991 World Championships in Athletics marked her second outing at the global level, and she again reached the semi-final stage of the 100 m. However, she was banned for three months from the sport after giving a positive doping test for strychnine – this was an unusual substance to be banned for, as it had largely fallen out of use after the early 20th century. Slyusar became only the sixth athlete to be disqualified for doping at the World Championships in Athletics, and the first from the Soviet Union.

Her doping ban fell at the end of the track and field season, so largely did not affect her schedule. Slyusar set a lifetime best of 11.05 seconds in the 100 m in Kyiv in 1992. With the Dissolution of the Soviet Union, she opted to represent her native Ukraine internationally. At the newly established Ukrainian Athletics Championships she became the first woman to claim a 100/200 m sprint double in 1993 (a feat matched by Anzhela Kravchenko shortly after).

She had her last year of international competition in 1994, at the age of 31. At the 1994 Goodwill Games in Saint Petersburg she formed a Ukrainian relay quartet with Kravchenko, Viktoriya Fomenko and her twin sister Antonina Slyusar. The team took the bronze medal behind the United States and Cuba (the Russian women were disqualified). In her only individual outing for Ukraine, she was a 100 m quarter-finalist at the 1994 European Athletics Championships. She teamed up with her twin sister for the relay and with Fomenko and Zhanna Tarnopolskaya the Ukrainian women took fourth place. This marked the end of her international career.

== Personal bests ==
- 100 metres – 11.05 seconds (1992)
- 200 metres – 22.59 seconds (1985)
- 60 metres indoor – 7.15 seconds (1992)
- 200 metres indoor – 23.01 seconds (1986) NR

== National titles ==
- Soviet Athletics Championships
  - 100 metres: 1984, 1986
- Soviet Indoor Athletics Championships
  - 60 metres: 1986
- Ukrainian Athletics Championships
  - 100 metres: 1993
  - 200 metres: 1993

== International competitions ==
Year	Competition	Venue	Position	Event	Notes
Representing the Soviet Union
1985	Universiade	Kobe, Japan	1st	100 m	11.22
1985	Universiade	Kobe, Japan	3rd	200 m	22.86
1985	Universiade	Kobe, Japan	2nd	4 × 100 m relay	43.43
1986	Goodwill Games	Moscow, Soviet Union	5th	100 m	11.22
1986	Goodwill Games	Moscow, Soviet Union	2nd	4 × 100 m relay	42.27
1986	European Championships	Stuttgart, West Germany	11th (sf)	100 m	11.3511.35 (wind: +1.2 m/s)
1986	European Championships	Stuttgart, West Germany	3rd	4 × 100 m relay	43.78 (heats)
1987	Universiade	Zagreb, Yugoslavia	2nd	100 m	11.34
1987	Universiade	Zagreb, Yugoslavia	2nd	4 × 100 m relay	43.17
1987	World Championships	Rome, Italy	8th (semis)	100 m	11.44
1987	World Championships	Rome, Italy	3rd	4 × 100 m relay	42.33
1991	World Championships	Tokyo, Japan	6th (semis)	100 m	11.42
Representing Ukraine
1994	Goodwill Games	Saint Petersburg, Russia	3rd	4 × 100 m relay	43.86
1994	European Championships	Helsinki, Finland	19th (qf)	100 m	11.62 (wind: +0.3 m/s)
1994	European Championships	Helsinki, Finland	4th	4 × 100 m relay	43.61

== See also ==
- List of doping cases in athletics
- List of 100 metres national champions (women)
