= Nelli Cooman =

Dutch sprinter (born 1964)

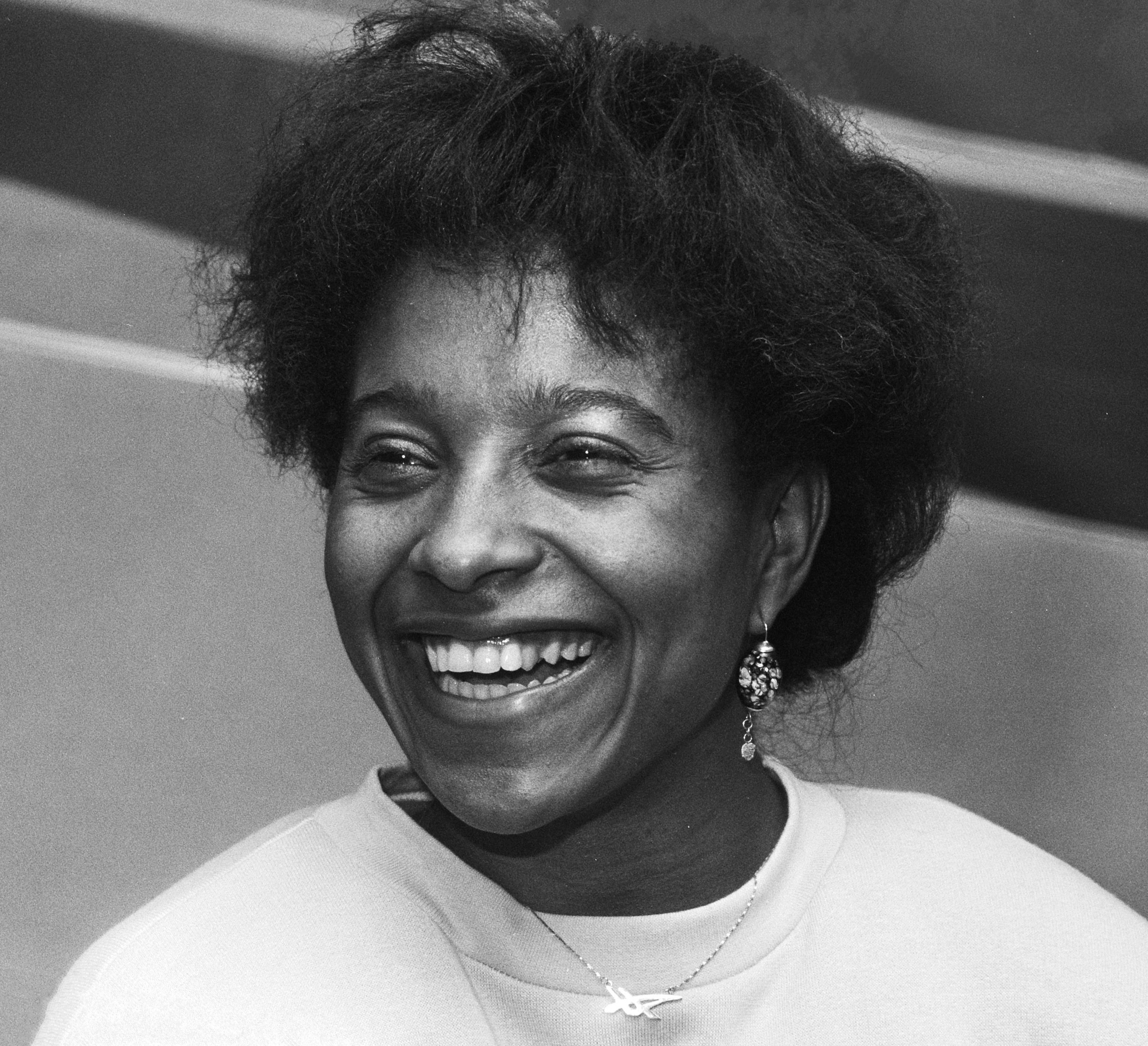
- Nelli Cooman in 1986

Personal information
- Born: 6 June 1964 (age 62) Paramaribo, Suriname
- Height: 1.59 m (5 ft 3 in)
- Weight: 60 kg (132 lb)

Sport
- Sport: Sprint
- Club: Atletiek- en Trimclub '75, Haren
Medal record
Representing the Netherlands
World Indoor Championships
Gold medal – first place	1987 Indianapolis	60 m
Gold medal – first place	1989 Budapest	60 m
European Championships
Bronze medal – third place	1986 Stuttgart	100 m
European Indoor Championships
Gold medal – first place	1985 Piraeus	60 m
Gold medal – first place	1986 Madrid	60 m
Gold medal – first place	1987 Lievin	60 m
Gold medal – first place	1988 Budapest	60 m
Gold medal – first place	1989 The Hague	60 m
Gold medal – first place	1994 Paris	60 m
Bronze medal – third place	1984 Gothenburg	60 m
Bronze medal – third place	1990 Glasgow	60 m

Cornelli "Nelli" Antoinette Hariëtte Cooman (born 6 June 1964) is a former Dutch athlete of Surinamese origin. At the 60 metres, she is two-time World indoor champion, six-time European indoor champion and former world record holder, running 7.00 secs in 1986. She also won 19 national titles.

== Early life ==
Cooman grew up in Suriname in a family together with four sisters and one brother. When she was eight, the family moved to Rotterdam in the Netherlands. She started to play soccer and soon got the nickname "Miss Pele". At sixteen, she was discovered to be a very good sprinter during a sporting event at school; thus she began a career in athletics. Three months later, she competed in the European Junior Championships in Utrecht and finished seventh in the 100 m sprint. At seventeen, she won the silver medal in the National Championships. After graduating secondary school, she turned professional with Henk Kraaijenhof as trainer.

== Professional career ==
During her time as a professional athlete from 1984 to 1995, she was twice world indoor champion in the 60 m (1987 and 1989), and six times European indoor champion. At the 1986 European Indoor Championships, she won in a time of 7.00 seconds, setting a world record. Because of that achievement, she was elected Dutch Sportswoman of the year. Her world record lasted until February 1992 and still stands as national record. Cooman took part twice in the Summer Olympics for the Netherlands: in 1988 in the 100 metres and 4 × 100 m relay and in 1992 in 100 metres.

In 1995, Cooman ended her career as a professional athlete.

== Personal bests ==
Personal best performances
Event	Time	Location	Date	Record
50 metres	6.19 i	Ottawa, Canada	31 January 1987	NR
55 metres	6.65 i	New York City, United States	30 January 1987	
60 metres	7.00 i	Madrid, Spain	23 February 1986	NR
100 metres	11.08 i	Stuttgart, Germany	27 August 1986	
100 metres	11.08 i	Seoul, South Korea	24 September 1988	

== International competitions ==
Representing the Netherlands
Year	Competition	Venue	Position	Event	Result
1984	European Indoor Championships	Gothenburg, Sweden	3rd	60 m	7.23 i
1985	European Indoor Championships	Piraeus, Greece	1st	60 m	7.10 i
1986	European Indoor Championships	Madrid, Spain	1st	60 m	7.00 i
1986	European Championships	Stuttgart, West Germany	3rd	100 m	11.08
1986	European Championships	Stuttgart, West Germany	7th	4 × 100 m relay	44.38
1987	European Indoor Championships	Lievin, France	1st	60 m	7.01 i
1987	World Indoor Championships	Indianapolis, United States	1st	60 m	7.08 i
1987	World Championships	Rome, Italy	13th (sf)	100 m	11.21
1988	European Indoor Championships	Budapest, Hungary	1st	60 m	7.04 i
1988	Olympic Games	Seoul, South Korea	12th (sf)	100 m	11.13
1988	Olympic Games	Seoul, South Korea	8th (sf)	4 × 100 m relay	43.48
1989	European Indoor Championships	The Hague, Netherlands	1st	60 m	7.15 i
1989	World Indoor Championships	Budapest, Hungary	1st	60 m	7.05 i
1990	European Indoor Championships	Glasgow, United Kingdom	3rd	60 m	7.14 i
1991	World Indoor Championships	Seville, Spain	9th (sf)	60 m	7.28 i
1992	Olympic Games	Barcelona, Spain	17th (qf)	100 m	11.55
1993	World Indoor Championships	Toronto, Canada	7th	60 m	7.29 i
1994	European Indoor Championships	Paris, France	1st	60 m	7.17 i
1994	European Championships	Helsinki, Finland	5th	100 m	11.40
1995	World Indoor Championships	Barcelona, Spain	6th	60 m	7.17 i

== Trivia ==
Since 1997, the Nelli Cooman Games are organised in the city of Stadskanaal. At first, these games were only for youth-category competitors, but they grew to be a national A-status KNAU (Royal Dutch Athletics Federation) event. Cooman is the honorary chairwoman of this event.

Dutch singer Gerard Cox wrote a song about Nelli Cooman to a tune by Stevie Wonder.

Records
First	Women's 60 metres world record holder 1986 – 1992	Succeeded by Merlene Ottey
Awards
Preceded by Carla Beurskens	KNAU Cup; 1986; 1994	Succeeded by Elly van Hulst
Preceded by Ellen van Langen	KNAU Cup; 1986; 1994	Succeeded by Sharon Jaklofsky
Preceded by Bettine Vriesekoop	Dutch Sportswoman of the Year; 1986	Succeeded by Irene de Kok
