= Pam Marshall =

American sprinter

Personal information
- Nationality: American
- Born: August 16, 1960 (age 65)
- Height: 1.78 m (5 ft 10 in)
- Weight: 63 kg (139 lb) 1987

Sport
- Country: United States
- Event(s): Sprinting (100 m, 200 m, 4 × 100 m)
Medal record
Women's athletics
World Championships
Gold medal – first place	1987 Rome	4 × 100 m relay

Pam Marshall (born August 16, 1960) is a retired American sprinter. She won a gold medal in the sprint relay and finished fourth in the 200 m final at the 1987 World Championships. She won the 200 m at the 1986 Goodwill Games and was a three-time US champion. Her 200 m best of 21.93 secs in 1988, ranked her 10th on the world all-time list at that time, and (as of 2021) still ranks her in the all-time top 30.

== Career ==
Marshall attended and competed for Long Beach City College.

Marshall competed in the 100 m, 200 m and 4 × 100 m Relay. Her best result was anchoring the U.S. 4 × 100 m relay team to the gold medal at the 1987 World Championships Rome Italy, in a time of 41.58 CR which still ranks as one of the fastest times ever.

She clocked an impressive 10.11 for her final 100 m which saw her bring the team home almost half a second ahead of the GDR team anchored by Marlies Göhr (10.41 secs). Pam came 8th in the 100 m and fourth in the 200 m at the same Championship.

She went on to make the USA Olympic team over 200 m the following season, however due to injury did not get past the preliminary rounds.

== Competition record ==
Year	Competition	Venue	Position	Event	Notes
Representing United States
1986	Goodwill Games	Moscow, Soviet Union	1st	200 m	22.12
1987	World Championships	Rome, Italy	8th	100 m	11.19
1987	World Championships	Rome, Italy	4th	200 m	22.18
1987	World Championships	Rome, Italy	1st	4 × 100 m	41.58 (CR)
1988	Olympic Games	Seoul, South Korea	DNF (heats)	200 m	—
National Championships
1984	US Championships	San Jose, California	3rd	200 m	22.67
1984	US Olympic Trials	Los Angeles, California	DNF (semis)	200 m	22.78 (quarter-final)
1985	US Championships	Indianapolis, Indiana	2nd	100 m	11.21
1985	US Championships	Indianapolis, Indiana	2nd	200 m	22.39
1986	US Championships	Eugene, Oregon	1st	100 m	10.85w
1986	US Championships	Eugene, Oregon	1st	200 m	22.24w
1987	US Championships	San Jose, California	3rd	100 m	10.99w
1987	US Championships	San Jose, California	1st	200 m	21.6hw
1988	US Olympic Trials	Indianapolis, Indiana	2nd	200 m	21.93

== Personal bests ==
Event	Time	Place	Date
100 m	11.01 s	Lausanne	15 September 1987
200 m	21.93 s	Indianapolis, IN	23 July 1988
400 m	49.99 s	Westwood, CA	17 May 1986

== External sources ==
- The International Track and Field Annual '88/9 Simon & Schuster ISBN 0-671-69917-2
- Pam Marshall at World Athletics
