= Marie-Françoise Lubeth =

French athletics competitor

Personal information
- Nationality: France
- Born: 20 November 1962 Lille, France
- Died: January 10, 2009 (aged 46) Lille, France

Sport
- Events: 100 m, 4 × 100 m
- Club: Lille University Club
- Coached by: José Gaumont

Marie-Françoise Lubeth (20 November 1962 – 10 January 2009) was a French athlete, who specialised in the sprints.

Trained by José Gaumont, Marie-Françoise ran for the Lille University Club and participated in 1984 Summer Olympics at Los Angeles. She attended the Olympics and was selected as an alternate for a relay but did not actually run. She was selected twice for French athletics teams, including the 1985 Cup Of Europe.

After her sports career, she worked at Dron Hospital at Tourcoing as head of the gynecology department. Secretary of the Community of African Churches of France, in 2008, she published Sprinteuse de Dieu (Sprinter of God ).

Marie-Francoise died at age 46 of breast cancer. Her mother died of the same illness at around the same age as Marie-Francoise
