= Mi-sun =

- Hangul: 미선
- RR: Miseon
- MR: Misŏn

Mi-sun, also spelled Mi-seon or Mee-sun, is a Korean name.

People with this name include:

== Entertainment and arts ==
- Park Mi-sun (born 1967), South Korean actress and comedian
- Jeon Mi-seon (born 1972), South Korean actress
- Park Mi-seon (born 1979), stage name Park Si-yeon, South Korean actress
- Kim Mi-sun (born 1986), stage name Song Ha-yoon, South Korean actress
- Miseon Lee (born 1959), South Korean painter based in Ireland

== Sportspeople ==
- Kim Mi-sun (born 1964), South Korean field hockey player
- Park Mi-seon (athlete) (born 1964), South Korean sprinter
- Kang Mee-sun (born 1971), South Korean volleyball player
- Lee Mi-sun (born 1979) South Korean basketball player
- Hong Mi-sun (born 1983), South Korean volleyball player
- Choi Mi-sun (born 1996), South Korean recurve archer

== Other ==
- Shim Mi-seon (1988–2002), one of the victims of the Yangju highway incident

== See also ==
- List of Korean given names
