= Christa Schumann-Lottmann =

Guatemalan sprinter

Personal information
- Nationality: Guatemalan
- Born: Christa María Schumann-Lottmann; 3 May 1964 (age 62) Guatemala City, Guatemala
- Height: 1.62 m (5 ft 4 in)
- Weight: 51 kg (112 lb)

Sport
- Sport: Sprinting
- Event: 100 metres
Medal record
Representing Guatemala
Central American Games
Gold medal – first place	1986 Guatemala City	100m
Gold medal – first place	1986 Guatemala City	200m
Gold medal – first place	1986 Guatemala City	400m
Gold medal – first place	1986 Guatemala City	4x100m relay

Christa María Schumann-Lottmann (born 3 May 1964) is a Guatemalan sprinter. She competed in the women's 100 metres at the 1984 Summer Olympics.

== International competitions ==
Year	Competition	Venue	Position	Event	Notes
Representing Guatemala
1980	Central American Championships	Guatemala City, Guatemala	2nd	200 m	26.0
1980	Central American Championships	Guatemala City, Guatemala	1st	Long jump	5.06 m
1984	Olympic Games	Los Angeles, United States	28th (qf)	100 m	12.23
1984	Olympic Games	Los Angeles, United States	26th (qf)	200 m	24.90
1984	Central American Championships	Guatemala City, Guatemala	3rd	100 m	11.7
1984	Central American Championships	Guatemala City, Guatemala	1st	200 m	24.6
1984	Central American Championships	Guatemala City, Guatemala	1st	4 × 100 m relay	47.9
1984	Central American Championships	Guatemala City, Guatemala	1st	4 × 400 m relay	3:58.3
1985	Universiade	Kobe, Japan	15th (sf)	100 m	11.92
1985	Universiade	Kobe, Japan	15th (sf)	200 m	24.68
1986	Central American and Caribbean Games	Guatemala City, Guatemala	1st	100 m	12.16
1986	Central American and Caribbean Games	Guatemala City, Guatemala	1st	200 m	24.59
1986	Central American and Caribbean Games	Guatemala City, Guatemala	1st	400 m	56.23
1986	Central American and Caribbean Games	Guatemala City, Guatemala	1st	4 x 400 m relay	3:55.35
1987	World Indoor Championships	Indianapolis, United States	14th (sf)	60 m	7.79
1987	World Indoor Championships	Indianapolis, United States	17th (h)	200 m	25.38
1987	Pan American Games	Indianapolis, United States	19th (h)	200 m	25.82
1987	Pan American Games	Indianapolis, United States	10th (h)	400 m hurdles	62.97

== Personal bests ==
Outdoor

- 100 metres – 11.92 (Kobe 1985)
- 200 metres – 23.6h (Guatemala 1986)
- 400 metres – 54.2h (Guatemala 1986)

Indoor

- 60 metres – 7.72 (Indianapolis 1987)
- 200 metres – 25.38 (Indianapolis 1987)
