= Alice Brown (sprinter) =

American sprinter

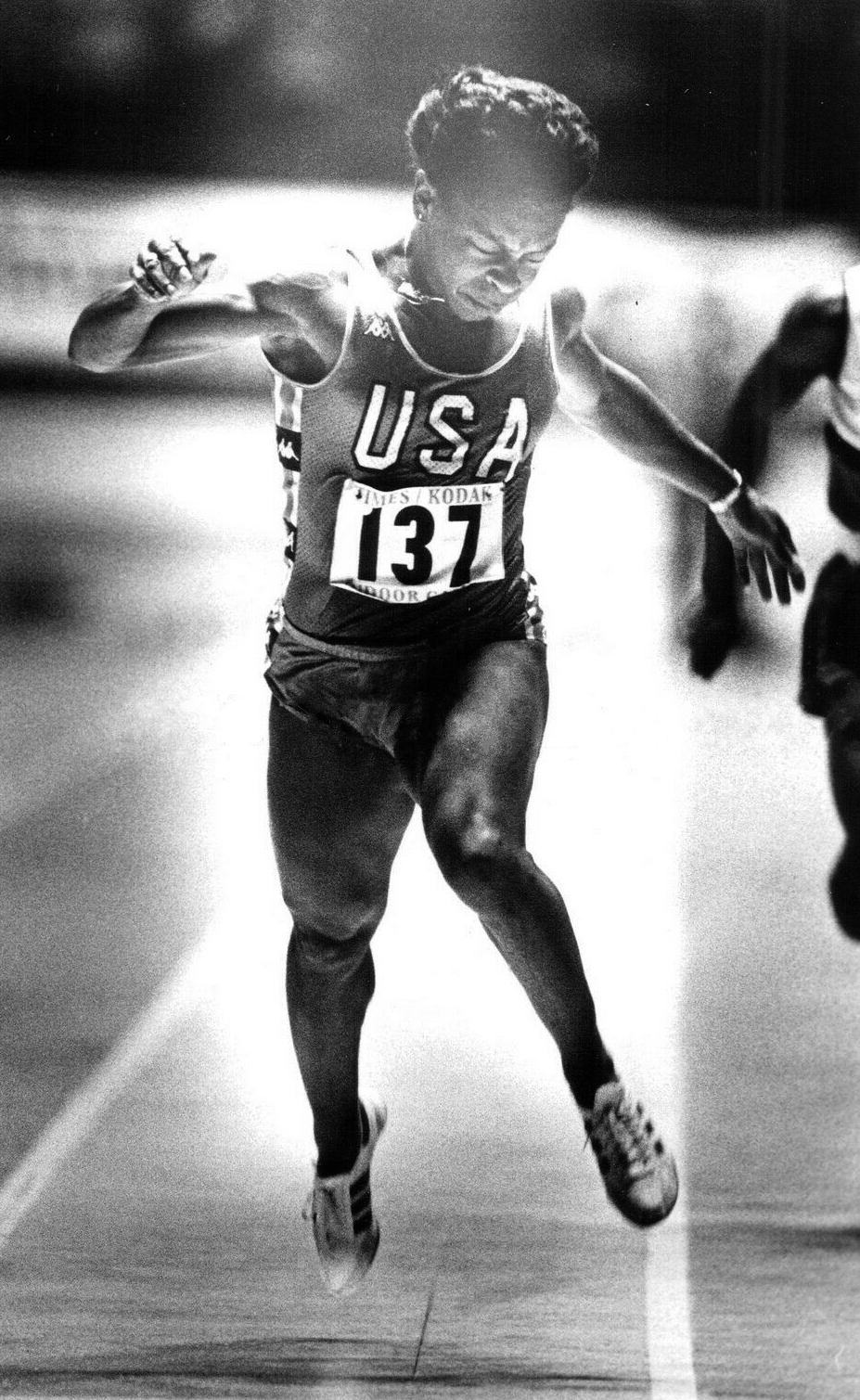
- Brown at the 1984 Summer Olympics

Personal information
- Born: September 20, 1960 (age 66) Jackson, Mississippi, U.S.
- Height: 5 ft 3 in (1.60 m)
- Weight: 130 lb (59 kg) (1987)

Sport
- Sport: Athletics
- Events: 100 m, 200 m
- College team: Cal State Northridge Matadors

Achievements and titles
- Personal bests: 100 m – 10.92 (1988); 200 m – 22.39 (1988)
Medal record
Representing the United States
Olympic Games
Gold medal – first place	1984 Los Angeles	4 × 100 m relay
Gold medal – first place	1988 Seoul	4 × 100 m relay
Silver medal – second place	1984 Los Angeles	100 m
World Championships
Gold medal – first place	1987 Rome	4 × 100 m relay

Alice Regina Brown (born September 20, 1960) is an American retired sprinter. Competing at the 1984 and 1988 Olympics she won two relay gold medals and an individual silver medal. She attended John Muir High School (Pasadena, California) and California State University, Northridge.

== 1980 Olympics ==
Brown qualified for the 1980 U.S. Olympic track and field team but did not compete due to the U.S. Olympic Committee's boycott of the 1980 Summer Olympics in Moscow, USSR. She was one of 461 athletes to receive a Congressional Gold Medal instead.

== 1984 Olympics ==
Noted for her fast start, she was the 1st leg runner in two US Olympic 4 × 100 Relay teams 1984–88, both teams winning the gold. At the 1984 Summer Olympics, in the individual 100 metres, Brown and American teammate Jeanette Bolden charged out to the lead, only to be overtaken by world record holder Evelyn Ashford, with Brown clearly taking the silver medal. Later, the U.S. relay team won the gold medal beating Canada by over a second, the greatest winning margin in the event's history. This was due to a very strong team which included all three U.S. sprinters that made the 100 m final and Brown's superb start. Shortly after the Olympics, she competed in the 100 metres at the Friendship Games in Prague, which were held as an event for sportspeople from Eastern Bloc countries who were boycotting that year's Olympics: the only US track athlete to enter the competition, she was unable to repeat her Olympic medal success there.

== 1987 World Championship ==
In 1987 Alice won 4 × 100 relay Gold at the World Championships Rome, Italy. A very strong and well-drilled team consisting of Diane Williams (2nd Leg), Florence Griffith-Joyner (3rd Leg) and Pam Marshall (anchor) were favorite. They won their semi-final with a time over a second faster than the usually dominant GDR team. They went on to win the final from the GDR team (Silver), clocking a time of 41.58 CR, which was a U.S. record at the time, and still ranks as one of the fastest times in history.

== 1988 Olympics ==
Brown qualified for and competed at the 1988 Seoul Games. In the final of the Women's 4 × 100 Relay all the strongest nations were present except for the Jamaicans who were non starters. Alice Brown once again led the United States challenge running the first leg. In a superb piece of relay running, she left the field trailing in her wake. By the time she handed over to Sheila Echols (2nd Leg), she had caught and was passing the Bulgarian athlete in the next lane. Florence Griffith-Joyner (3rd Leg) took over and ran solidly, handed over to Evelyn Ashford (anchor), who in very impressive fashion made up three metres on Marlies Göhr and led the US team to victory by a clear metre. The winning time was down (41.98 seconds) on the U.S. record due to sloppy baton exchanges. It was superior basic speed and sheer talent that won the U.S. their second consecutive gold in this event.
