= Rufina Ubah =

Nigerian sprinter

Personal information
- Born: 4 April 1959 (age 67) Owerri, Nigeria
- Height: 1.69 m (5 ft 7 in)
- Weight: 60 kg (132 lb)

Sport
- Country: Nigeria
- Sport: Track and field
- Events: 100 m, 200 m

Achievements and titles
- Personal bests: 100 m: 11.22 (1990); 200 m: 23.36 (1980)
Medal record
Women's athletics
Representing Nigeria
African Championships
Gold medal – first place	1985 Cairo	100 m
Gold medal – first place	1985 Cairo	200 m
Silver medal – second place	1979 Dakar	4×100 m
Silver medal – second place	1985 Cairo	4×100 m
Silver medal – second place	1992 Belle Vue Harel	4×100 m
Bronze medal – third place	1989 Lagos	100 m
Bronze medal – third place	1992 Belle Vue Harel	100 m
All-Africa Games
Bronze medal – third place	1991 Cairo	100 m

Rufina Ubah (also spelled Uba; born 4 April 1959) is a former Nigerian sprinter who specialised in the 100 metres.

Ubah is from Owerri, Imo, Nigeria. She attended Egbu Girls Secondary School and later moved to Columbia, Missouri, where she competed for the Missouri Tigers track and field team.

Ubah finished fourth in 4 x 100 metres relay at the 1991 World Championships, together with teammates Beatrice Utondu, Christy Opara-Thompson and Mary Onyali-Omagbemi.

On the individual level, Ubah won a bronze medal at the 1991 All-Africa Games.

== International competitions ==
Representing Nigeria & Africa
Year	Competition	Venue	Position	Event	Notes
1980	Summer Olympics	Moscow, Soviet Union	20th (q)	100 m	11.60
1980	Summer Olympics	Moscow, Soviet Union	18th (q)	200 m	23.55
1983	World Championships	Helsinki, Finland	19th (q)	100 m	11.60
1983	World Championships	Helsinki, Finland	28th (q)	200 m	24.72
1985	African Championships	Cairo, Egypt	1st	100 m	11.61
1985	African Championships	Cairo, Egypt	1st	200 m	23.79
1985	Universiade	Kobe, Japan	8th	100 m	11.78
1985	Universiade	Kobe, Japan	14th (sf)	200 m	24.51
1985	Universiade	Kobe, Japan	4th	4 × 400 m relay	3:34.41
1989	African Championships	Lagos, Nigeria	3rd	100 m	11.47
1991	World Championships	Tokyo, Japan	22nd (q)	100 m	11.54
1991	World Championships	Tokyo, Japan	4th	4 × 100 m relay	42.77
1991	All-Africa Games	Cairo, Egypt	3rd	100 m	11.43
1992	African Championships	Belle Vue Maurel, Mauritius	3rd	100 m	11.42
1992	World Cup	Havana, Cuba	3rd	4 × 100 m relay	44.21
