= Angela Phipps =

Canadian sprinter

Personal information
- Nationality: Canadian
- Born: 17 February 1964 (age 62) Leeds, England

Sport
- Sport: Sprinting
- Event: 4 × 100 metres relay
Medal record
Representing Canada
Commonwealth Games
| Silver medal – second place | 1986 Edinburgh | 4x100m relay |

Angela Phipps (born 17 February 1964) is a retired Canadian sprinter who specialised in the 100 and 200 metres.

She won the silver medal at the 1985 Pacific Conference Games (100 m), finished sixth at the 1987 World Indoor Championships (200 m), seventh at the 1987 Pan American Games 100 m and fourth at the 1987 Pan American Games 200 m. She also competed at the 1987 World Championships (100 m) without reaching the final.

In the 4 × 100 metres relay she won a silver medal at the 1985 Pacific Conference Games, finished fourth at the 1985 World Cup, won a silver medal at the 1986 Commonwealth Games and finished sixth at the 1987 World Championships. She also competed at the 1988 Summer Olympics without reaching the final.

She ran collegiately for the LSU Tigers.
