= List of Guatemalan records in athletics =

The following are the national records in athletics in Guatemala maintained by its national athletics federation: Federación Nacional de Atletismo de Guatemala (FNA).

== Outdoor ==
Key to tables: Awaiting ratification Record not kept by FNA Not ratified or later rescinded by FNA

=== Men ===
Event	Record	Athlete	Date	Meet	Place	Ref.
100 m	10.32	Oscar Meneses	20 June 1998		Caracas, Venezuela	
200 m	21.09 (−1.5 m/s)	Oscar Meneses	23 May 1998		Edwardsville, United States	
400 m	46.50	José Bermúdez	23 June 2019		Managua, Nicaragua	
800 m	1:49.07	Luis Martínez	25 August 1991	World Championships	Tokyo, Japan	
1500 m	3:35.32	Luis Grijalva	18 July 2021	Sunset Tour Meet	Mission Viejo, United States	
1500 m	3:44.44	Luis Martínez	27 July 1989			
Mile	4:02.64	Luis Grijalva	29 June 2017	Track Town Summer Series		
2000 m	5:00.4+	Luis Grijalva	17 September 2023	Prefontaine Classic	Eugene, United States	
3000 m	7:29.43	Luis Grijalva	17 September 2023	Prefontaine Classic	Eugene, United States	
Two miles	8:21.98	Luis Grijalva	21 August 2021	Prefontaine Classic	Eugene, United States	
5000 m	12:50.58	Luis Grijalva	30 May 2024	Bislett Games	Oslo, Norway	
5 km (road)	14:41+	Alberto Gonzalez Mindez	16 January 2022	Houston Half Marathon	Houston, United States	
10,000 m	27:26.02	Luis Grijalva	16 March 2024	The TEN	San Juan Capistrano, United States	
10 km (road)	29:04+	Alberto Gonzalez Mindez	16 January 2022	Houston Half Marathon	Houston, United States	
15 km (road)	43:21+	Alberto Gonzalez Mindez	16 January 2022	Houston Half Marathon	Houston, United States	
20 km (road)	58:05+	Alberto Gonzalez Mindez	16 January 2022	Houston Half Marathon	Houston, United States	
Half marathon	1:01:20 (Note: by World Athletics source, 1:01:18 by official result source)	Alberto Gonzalez Mindez	16 January 2022	Houston Half Marathon	Houston, United States	
Half marathon	1:01.03	Alberto Gonzalez Mindez	15 January 2023	Houston Half Marathon	Houston, United States	
25 km (road)	1:16:04+	Alberto Gonzalez Mindez	3 December 2023	Valencia Marathon	Valencia, Spain	
30 km (road)	1:31:16+	Alberto Gonzalez Mindez	3 December 2023	Valencia Marathon	Valencia, Spain	
Marathon	2:07:40 (Note: by FNA source; 2:07:38 by official result source)	Alberto Gonzalez Mindez	3 December 2023	Valencia Marathon	Valencia, Spain	
110 m hurdles	13.78 (−0.9 m/s)	Wienstan Mena	19 October 2025	Central American Games	Quetzaltenango, Guatemala	
400 m hurdles	50.16	Allan Ayala	13 June 2009	Central American Championships	Guatemala City, Guatemala	
3000 m steeplechase	8:46.45	Hugo-Allan García	2 September 1985	Universiade	Kobe, Japan	
High jump	2.12 m	Ken Franzúa	13 July 2018 (Note: by FNA source, 14 July 2018 by World Athletics source)		Guatemala City, Guatemala	
Pole vault	5.10 m A (Note: not ratified by FNA but recognised by World Athletics)	Christiaan Higueros	15 May 2022		Querétaro City, Mexico	
Pole vault	5.20 m A (Note: ratified by FNA but not recognised by World Athletics)	Christiaan Higueros	13 February 2022		Querétaro City, Mexico	
Long jump	7.97 m (+1.9 m/s)	Nicolás Arriola	9 July 2022	CVEATC	Chula Vista, United States	
Triple jump	15.95 m (+0.2 m/s)	Fredy Lemus	8 June 2019 (Note: by World Athletics source, 7 June 2019 by FNA source)		Guatemala City, Guatemala	
Shot put	16.61 m	Edson Haroldo Monzón	1 May 2004		La Jolla, United States	
Discus throw	50.49 m	Rául Rivera	26 March 2004		Guatemala City, Guatemala	
Hammer throw	66.50 m	Diego Berrios	11 May 2017	Guatemalan Junior/Youth Championships	Guatemala City, Guatemala	
Javelin throw	72.21 m	Luis Taracena	30 March 2019		San Salvador, El Salvador	
Decathlon	7448 pts	Octavius Gillespie	5-6 June 2004		Chula Vista, United States	
Decathlon	100m (wind) / Long jump (wind) / Shot put / High jump / 400m / 110m H (wind) / Discus / Pole vault / Javelin / 1500m; 11.22 / 7.32 m w / 13.14 m / 2.00 m / 52.17 / 15.39w / 42.89 m / 4.30 m / 60.76 m / 4:58.01					
10,000 m walk (track)	40:10.73	Érick Barrondo	25 October 2013		Guatemala City, Guatemala	
10 km walk (road)	38:57+	Julio René Martínez	8 May 1999	Oder-Neisse Grand Prix	Eisenhüttenstadt, Germany	
20,000 m walk (track)	1:23:05.15	Érick Barrondo	8 August 2014		Guatemala City, Guatemala	
20 km walk (road)	1:17:46	Julio René Martínez	8 May 1999	Oder-Neisse Grand Prix	Eisenhüttenstadt, Germany	
35,000 m walk (track)	2:47:20	Luis García	30 January 2010			
35 km walk (road)	2:31:26	Érick Barrondo	23 April 2022	Dudinská Päťdesiatka	Dudince, Slovakia	
50 km walk (road)	3:41:09	Erick Barrondo	23 March 2013	Dudinska 50-ka	Dudince, Slovakia	
4 × 100 m relay	39.25	Guatemala; Rolando Blanco; Oscar Meneses; José Meneses; José Tinoco	30 July 2000		Havana, Cuba	
4 × 400 m relay	3:13.83	Guatemala; Hans Villagrán; Jan Holwerda; Allan Ayala; Camillo Quevedo	20 July 2008	NACAC U23 Championships	Toluca, Mexico	

=== Women ===
Event	Record	Athlete	Date	Meet	Place	Ref.
100 m	11.66 (−0.2 m/s)	Mariandrée Chacón	17 June 2022	Central American U18 and U20 Championships	Managua, Nicaragua	
100 m	11.66 (−1.1 m/s)	Mariandrée Chacón	18 October 2025	Central American Games	Quetzaltenango, Guatemala	
150 m	18.98 NWI	Mariandrée Chacón	7 March 2021		Puerto Barrios, Guatemala	
200 m	23.6 h	Christa Schumann	29 August 1986		Guatemala	
200 m	23.72 (+1.9 m/s)	Mariandrée Chacón	29 April 2023	UNF East Coast Relays	Jacksonville, United States	
400 m	54.2 h	Christa Schumann	30 August 1986		Guatemala	
400 m	55.64	Patricia Meigham	4 August 1984	Olympic Games	Los Angeles, United States	
800 m	2:08.7 h	Ana Lucia Hurtado	17 May 2001		Guatemala City, Guatemala	
1500 m	4:17.24	Viviana Aroche	2 June 2023	Memorial José Luis Hernandez	Pamplona, Spain	
3000 m	9:32.27	Viviana Aroche	18 June 2022	Meeting International de Albacete	Albacete, Spain	
5000 m	15:54.48	Viviana Aroche	26 May 2023	Meeting Jaen Paraiso	Andújar, Spain	
5 km (road)	17:09+ Mx	Viviana Aroche	15 February 2026	Barcelona Half Marathon	Barcelona, Spain	
5 km (road)	15:38+ (Note: not ratified by World Athletics, due to a downhill course)	Viviana Aroche	11 June 2023	Madrid Vintage Run	Madrid, Spain	
10,000 m	32:35.19	Viviana Aroche	28 March 2026	The TEN	San Juan Capistrano, United States	
10 km (road)	33:19 Mx	Viviana Aroche	24 May 2025	10 km en Ruta Villa de Laredo	Laredo, Spain	
10 km (road)	33:42+ Wo	Viviana Aroche	20 September 2026	World Road Running Championships	Copenhagen, Denmark	
10 km (road)	31:48 (Note: not ratified by World Athletics, due to a downhill course)	Viviana Aroche	11 June 2023	Madrid Vintage Run	Madrid, Spain	
15 km (road)	50:48+ Wo	Viviana Aroche	20 September 2026	World Road Running Championships	Copenhagen, Denmark	
20 km (road)	1:07:21+ Wo	Viviana Aroche	20 September 2026	World Road Running Championships	Copenhagen, Denmark	
Half marathon	1:10:53 Wo	Viviana Aroche	20 September 2026	World Road Running Championships	Copenhagen, Denmark	
25 km (road)	1:32:23+	Sandra Genoveva	23 April 2023	Hamburg Marathon	Hamburg, Germany	
Marathon	2:39:23	Sandra Genoveva	23 April 2023	Hamburg Marathon	Hamburg, Germany	
100 m hurdles	15.05	Rosa Balazar	5 March 2017		Guatemala City, Guatemala	
100 m hurdles	14.19 A (Note: not ratified by federation but recognised by World Athletics)	Amapola Arimany	23 July 1988		Mexico City, Mexico	
100 m hurdles	14.16 (Note: ratified by federation but doubtful because of long period of time)	Amapola Arimany	10 June 2005			
400 m hurdles	59.79	Larissa Soto	26 July 1991	Central American and Caribbean Championships	Xalapa, Mexico	
3000 m steeplechase	10:51.10	Débora Eunice Quel	7 August 2026	CAC Games	Santo Domingo, Dominican Republic	
High jump	1.79 m	Ana Regina Quiñónez	19 July 1991		Kingston, Jamaica	
Pole vault	3.50 m	Peggy Ovalle	15 May 2005		St. Charles, United States	
Long jump	6.36 m (+0.4 m/s)	Thelma Fuentes	14 July 2018	CAC Games Trials	Guatemala City, Guatemala	
Triple jump	13.72 m (±0.0 m/s)	Thelma Fuentes	23 June 2018		San Salvador, El Salvador	
Shot put	13.52 m	Dorothy López	6 November 2009		Guatemala City, Guatemala	
Discus throw	48.85 m (Note: not ratified by FNA but recognised by World Athletics)	Ana Lucia Espinoza	29 May 2004		Guatemala City, Guatemala	
Discus throw	48.25 m	Ana Lucia Espinoza	30 November 2001	Central American Games	Guatemala City, Guatemala	
Hammer throw	59.85 m	Sophie Pérez	21 April 2023	Wake Forest Invitational	Winston-Salem, United States	
Javelin throw	44.27 m	Sofia Alonso	2 June 2018	Mexican Championships	Monterrey, Mexico	
Heptathlon	4688 pts A (Note: ratified by FNA but not recognised by World Athletics)	Larissa Soto	3–4 June 1989		Mexico City, Mexico	
Heptathlon	100m H (wind) / High jump / Shot put / 200m (wind) / Long jump (wind) / Javelin / 800m					
Heptathlon	4590 pts (Note: recognised by World Athletics)	Larissa Soto	27–28 July 1991	Central American and Caribbean Championships	Xalapa, Mexico	
Heptathlon	100m H (wind) / High jump / Shot put / 200m (wind) / Long jump (wind) / Javelin / 800m; 16.10 / 1.47 m / 10.17 m / 25.96 / 5.42 m w / 28.52 m / 2:19.34					
5000 m walk (track)	22:19.86	Maritza Poncio	24 October 2014		Guatemala City, Guatemala	
10,000 m walk (track)	44:04.90	Mirna Ortíz	7 March 2015		Guatemala City, Guatemala	
10 km walk (road)	43:09	Mirna Ortíz	13 September 2014		Katowice, Poland	
20,000 m walk (track)	1:31:53.72	Mirna Ortíz	8 August 2014		Guatemala City, Guatemala	
20 km walk (road)	1:28:31	Mirna Ortíz	6 April 2013	Grande Prémio Internacional de Rio Maior em Marcha Atlética	Rio Maior, Portugal	
35 km walk (road)	2:52:07	Mirna Ortíz	8 May 2022		San Jerónimo, Guatemala	
50 km walk (road)	4:13:56 A	Mirna Ortíz	24 February 2019	Central American Race Walking Championships	Guatemala City, Guatemala	
4 × 100 m relay	46.3 h	Guatemala; Patricia Quiñónez; Akil Arévalo; Patricia Meigham; Christa Schumann	20 July 1982		Mexico City, Mexico	
4 × 400 m relay	3:53.83	Guatemala; Rosana Rodriguez; Sandra Oliveros; Luz Patrizia Valenzuela; Ana Lucia Hurtado	27 May 2001		Havana, Cuba	

== Indoor ==
=== Men ===
Event	Record	Athlete	Date	Meet	Place	Ref.
60 m	6.70 A	Rolando Blanco	7 February 2004		Flagstaff, United States	
200 m	21.52	Rolando Blanco	19 February 2000		New York City, United States	
400 m	50.28	Allan Ayala Acevedo	29 January 2010	Montana State Open #2	Bozeman, United States	
800 m	1:55.66	Arisk Perdomo	10 March 1995	World Championships	Barcelona, Spain	
1500 m	3:41.11	Luis Grijalva	11 February 2022	Lilac Grand Prix	Spokane, United States	
Mile	3:53.53	Luis Grijalva	27 January 2023	BU John Thomas Terrier Classic	Boston, United States	
3000 m	7:33.86	Luis Grijalva	11 February 2023	Millrose Games	New York City, United States	
5000 m	13:29.74	Luis Grijalva	24 January 2020	BU John Thomas Terrier Classic	Boston, United States	
60 m hurdles	8.47	Allan Ayala Acevedo	12 February 2010	NDSU Bison Open	Fargo, United States	
High jump	2.08 m	Teodoro Palacios	8 March 1963		Chicago, United States	
Pole vault	4.40 m	Octavious Gillespie	5 February 2005		Lincoln, United States	
Long jump	6.95 m	Octavious Gillespie	4 February 2005		Lincoln, United States	
Triple jump						
Shot put	14.77 m A	Mauricio Galindo	9 December 2022	UCCS Pre-Holiday Multi	Colorado Springs, United States	
Heptathlon	5348 pts	Mauricio Vega Galindo	27–28 February 2026	Big South Championships	Columbia, United States	
Heptathlon	60m / Long jump / Shot put / High jump / 60m H / Pole vault / 1000m; 7.18 / 6.54 m / 14.47 m / 1.92 m / 8.46 / 4.22 m / 2:48.02					
5000 m walk						
4 × 400 m relay						

=== Women ===
Event	Record	Athlete	Date	Meet	Place	Ref.
60 m	7.57	Mariandrée Chacón	28 February 2026	ASUN Championships	Louisville, United States	
200 m	23.75	Mariandrée Chacón	28 February 2026	ASUN Championships	Louisville, United States	
400 m						
800 m	2:22.80	Cristina Girón	6 March 1987	World Championships	Indianapolis, United States	
1500 m	4:56.98	Cristina Girón	8 March 1987	World Championships	Indianapolis, United States	
3000 m	9:56.67	Dina Judith Velasquez Cruz	14 March 2003	World Championships	Birmingham, United Kingdom	
5000 m	16:58.96 (Note: outdoor mark ratified as absolute record)	Evelyn Chávez	3 February 2017	Meyo Invitational	Notre Dame, United States	
60 m hurdles						
High jump						
Pole vault	3.35 m	Peggy Ovalle	28 January 2006		Lawrence, United States	
Pole vault	3.35 m	Peggy Ovalle	10 March 2006		Johnson City, United States	
Long jump	5.63 m	Estefany Cruz	15 January 2011		Baton Rouge, United States	
Triple jump	12.45 m	Estefany Cruz	14 January 2012		Birmingham, United States	
Shot put	12.34 m	Sabrina Gaitan	17 January 2015		Johnson City, United States	
Weight throw	17.67 m	Sophie Pérez	18 February 2023	JDL DMR Invitational	Winston-Salem, United States	
Pentathlon						
Pentathlon	60m H / High jump / Shot put / Long jump / 800m					
3000 m walk	12:40.33	Mirna Ortiz	18 February 2018	French Championships	Liévin, France	
4 × 400 m relay						
