= Silke Möller =

East German sprinter

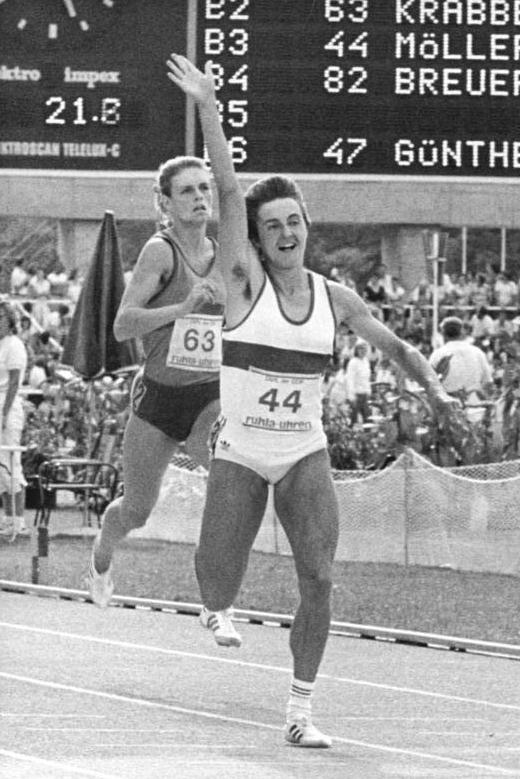

Medal record

Women's athletics

Representing East Germany

Olympic Games
Silver medal – second place	1988 Seoul	4×100 m

World Championships
Gold medal – first place	1983 Helsinki	4×100 m
Gold medal – first place	1987 Rome	100 m
Gold medal – first place	1987 Rome	200 m
Silver medal – second place	1987 Rome	4×100 m

European Championships
Gold medal – first place	1986 Stuttgart	4×100 m
Gold medal – first place	1990 Split	4×100 m
Silver medal – second place	1990 Split	100 m
Bronze medal – third place	1986 Stuttgart	200 m

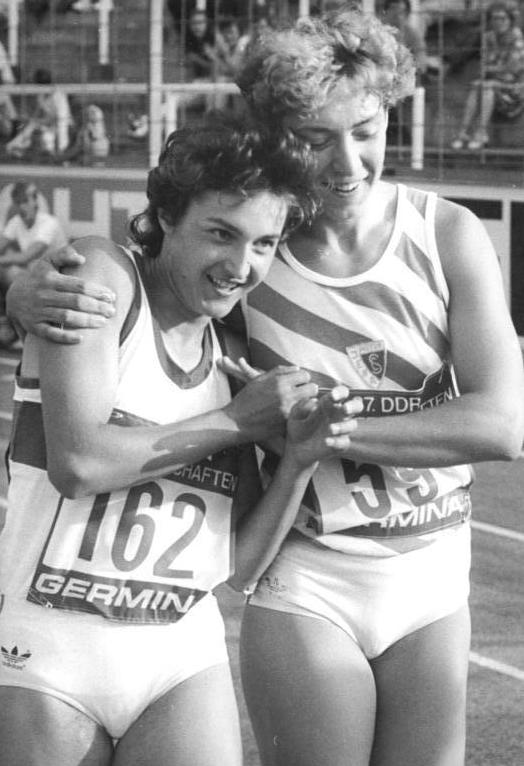
Silke Gladisch (left) with Sabine Rieger in (1986)

Silke Möller, née Silke Gladisch, (20 June 1964) is a German athlete, who in the 1980s competed for East Germany as one of the best female sprinters in the world. She was a member of the East German quartet that broke the world record in the 4 × 100 m relay at the World cup in Canberra on 6 October 1985. She and teammates Sabine Rieger, Marlies Göhr, and Ingrid Auerswald ran a time of 41.37 seconds, which stood as the world record until 2012. She is the 1987 World champion at both 100 metres and 200 metres.

== Biography ==
Möller was born in Stralsund, Bezirk Rostock (present-day Mecklenburg-Vorpommern). During her career she often stood in the shadows of Göhr, Marita Koch, and Heike Drechsler. Only in 1987, while still using her maiden name Gladisch, did she come into her own: at the track and field world championship of 1987 she won two titles – in the 100 m sprint and the 200 m sprint, as well as second place with the 4 × 100 m relay team. With these results she was chosen as the East German sportswoman of the year.

Möller's 200 m final performance at Rome in 1987 was exceptionally fast, she stopped the clock at 21.74 seconds. She had won the race by several meters and defeated a world class field including Florence Griffith and Merlene Ottey. Her time of 21.74 seconds was only just outside the then world record of 21.71 held by Marita Koch and Heike Drechsler.

At the 1988 Summer Olympics in Seoul she won the silver medal as a member of the East German 4 × 100 m relay team (she had at that time taken the name Möller).

In 1992 she was implicated with Katrin Krabbe and Grit Breuer in a doping scandal, but was later cleared by the International Athletic Federation (IAAF). Shortly before the 1992 Summer Olympics she quit her athletic career and began to study history in Rostock. She worked as a history and sports teacher. She has a daughter.

Möller represented the Empor Rostock sport club and trained under Wolfgang Meier (Marita Koch's coach and now husband). While she was actively competing, she was 1.63 metres tall and weighed 57 kilograms.

== Achievements ==
Year	Competition	Venue	Position	Event	Notes
Representing East Germany
1983	World Championships	Helsinki, Finland	semifinal	100 m	11.30
1983	World Championships	Helsinki, Finland	1st	4 × 100 m	41.76
1984	Friendship Games	Prague, Czechoslovakia	4th	100 m	11.10
1985	World Indoor Games	Paris, France	1st	60 m	7.20
1985	European Indoor Indoor Championships	Piraeus, Greece	4th	60 m	7.24
1985	World Cup	Canberra, Australia	1st	4 × 100 m	41.37
1986	European Indoor Championships	Madrid, Spain	3rd	60 m	7.14
1986	European Championships	Stuttgart, West Germany	4th	100 m	11.09
1986	European Championships	Stuttgart, West Germany	3rd	200 m	22.49
1986	European Championships	Stuttgart, West Germany	1st	4 × 100 m	41.84
1987	World Championships	Rome, Italy	1st	100 m	10.90
1987	World Championships	Rome, Italy	1st	200 m	21.74
1987	World Championships	Rome, Italy	2nd	4 × 100 m	41.95
1988	European Indoor Championships	Budapest, Hungary	2nd	60 m	7.05
1988	Olympic Games	Seoul, South Korea	semifinal	100 m	11.12
1988	Olympic Games	Seoul, South Korea	5th	200 m	22.09
1988	Olympic Games	Seoul, South Korea	2nd	4 × 100 m	42.09
1989	World Cup	Barcelona, Spain	3rd	100 m	11.24
1989	World Cup	Barcelona, Spain	1st	200 m	22.46
1989	World Cup	Barcelona, Spain	1st	4 × 100 m	42.21
1990	European Championships	Split, Yugoslavia	2nd	100 m	11.10
1990	European Championships	Split, Yugoslavia	1st	4 × 100 m	41.68

== Other results ==
- 1981 Junior European champion in the 4 × 100 m relay (43.77 seconds)
- 1985 European Cup: winner in the 4 × 100 m relay
- 1987 European Cup winner in the 200 m and 4 × 100 m relay

== See also ==
- German all-time top lists – 100 metres
- German all-time top lists – 200 metres

Awards
Preceded by (East Germany) Heike Drechsler	East German Sportswoman of the Year; 1987	Succeeded by (East Germany) Kristin Otto
Sporting positions
Preceded by (East Germany) Heike Drechsler	Women's 200 m Best Year Performance; 1987	Succeeded by (United States) Florence Griffith-Joyner
