= Daniela Ferrian =

Italian sprinter (born 1961)

Personal information
- Nationality: Italian
- Born: 16 September 1961 (age 64) Asti, Italy
- Height: 1.70 m (5 ft 7 in)
- Weight: 53 kg (117 lb)

Sport
- Country: Italy
- Sport: Athletics
- Event: Sprint
- Club: Snia Milano

Achievements and titles
- Personal bests: 100 m: 11.3 (1985); 200 m: 23.73 (1986)
Medal record
Event / 1st / 2nd / 3rd; Mediterranean Games / 0 / 3 / 0
Mediterranean Games
Silver medal – second place	1983 Casablanca	4 × 100 m relay
Silver medal – second place	1987 Latakia	4 × 100 m relay
Silver medal – second place	1991 Athens	4 × 100 m relay

Daniela Ferrian (born 12 September 1961) is an Italian former sprinter, three times silver medal with the Italian team of the 4 × 100 metres relay at the Mediterranean Games.

== Biography ==
Her best result individual, at international level, was the 4th place at the 1987 European Athletics Indoor Championships, held in Liévin. She participated at the 1988 Summer Olympics. She won national championships at various distances 7 times. She has 51 caps in national team from 1982 to 1993.

== Achievements ==
Year	Competition	Venue	Position	Event	Performance	Notes
1983	Mediterranean Games	(Morocco) Casablanca	2nd	4 × 100 metres relay	44.89	
1987	European Indoor Championships	(France) Liévin	4th	200 metres	23.57	
1987	Mediterranean Games	(Syria) Latakia	2nd	4 × 100 metres relay	45.17	
1988	Olympic Games	(South Korea) Seoul	Semi-final	4 × 100 metres relay	43.87	
1991	Mediterranean Games	(Greece) Athens	2nd	4 × 100 metres relay	43.67	
1991	World Championships	(Japan) Tokyo	7th	4 × 100 metres relay	43.76	

== National titles ==
- 1 win on 200 metres at the Italian Athletics Championships (1986)
- 2 wins on 60 metres at the Italian Athletics Indoor Championships (1986, 1987)
- 4 wins on 200 metres at the Italian Athletics Indoor Championships (1985, 1987, 1991, 1993)

== See also ==
- Italy national relay team - All the medals
