= Nadezhda Georgieva =

Bulgarian sprinter (born 1961)

Medal record

Women's athletics

Representing Bulgaria

European Championships
Silver medal – second place	1986 Stuttgart	4×100 m

Nadezhda Georgieva (Bulgarian: Надежда Георгиева; born 7 September 1961) is a Bulgarian former sprinter. She won a silver medal in the sprint relay at the 1986 European Championships and reached the 200 metres final at the 1987 World Championships. She also represented her country at the 1988 Seoul Olympics.

== Career ==
Born in Gabrovo, Georgieva was a member of the club CSKA Sofia. Prevented from competing at the 1984 Los Angeles Olympics because of the Soviet-led boycott, she did win two medals at the 1984 Friendship Games, with bronze in the 200 metres and gold in the 4 x 100 metres relay. She added a silver medal in the relay at the 1986 European Championships. She had one of her best seasons in 1987, including finishing second in the 200 metres at the European Cup in Prague and finishing seventh in the 200 metres final at the World Championships in Rome. She competed at the 1988 Seoul Olympics, where she was eliminated in the semifinals of the 200 metres, missing out on the final by one place.

== Personal bests ==
- 100 metres – 11.09 secs (1983)
- 200 metres – 22.42 secs (1983)

== International competitions ==
Year	Competition	Venue	Position	Event	Notes
Representing Bulgaria
1983	World Championships	Helsinki, Finland	13th (sf)	100m	11.36
1983	World Championships	Helsinki, Finland	11th (sf)	200m	23.26
1983	World Championships	Helsinki, Finland	4th	4 × 100 m	42.93
1984	Friendship Games	Prague, Czechoslovakia	7th	100m	11.32
1984	Friendship Games	Prague, Czechoslovakia	3rd	200m	22.79
1984	Friendship Games	Prague, Czechoslovakia	1st	4 × 100 m	42.62
1986	European Championships	Stuttgart, Germany	2nd	4 × 100 m	42.68
1987	European Cup	Prague, Czechoslovakia	2nd	200m	22.50
1987	European Cup	Prague, Czechoslovakia	2nd	4 × 100 m	42.31
1987	World Championships	Rome, Italy	10th (sf)	100m	11.10
1987	World Championships	Rome, Italy	8th	200m	22.55
1987	World Championships	Rome, Italy	4th	4 × 100 m	42.71
1988	Olympic Games	Seoul, South Korea	11th (sf)	200m	22.67
1988	Olympic Games	Seoul, South Korea	5th	4 × 100 m	43.02
(sf) Indicates overall position in semifinal round.
