= Park Mi-sun (athlete) =

South Korean sprinter

Personal information
- Nationality: South Korean
- Born: 13 September 1964 (age 61)

Sport
- Sport: Sprinting
- Event: 4 × 100 metres relay
Medal record
Women's athletics
Representing South Korea
Asian Games
| Bronze medal – third place | 1982 New Delhi | 4x100 m relay |
| Bronze medal – third place | 1986 Seoul | 200 m |
| Bronze medal – third place | 1986 Seoul | 4x100 m relay |
Asian Championships
| Bronze medal – third place | 1981 Tokyo | 4×100 m relay |

Park Mi-sun (born 13 September 1964) is a South Korean sprinter. She competed in the women's 4 × 100 metres relay at the 1988 Summer Olympics.
