= Pepa Pavlova =

Bulgarian sprinter

Personal information
- Born: 1 January 1961 (age 65) Sofia, Bulgaria

Sport
- Sport: Track and field
Medal record
Representing Bulgaria
Summer Universiade
Bronze medal – third place	1985 Kobe	4x400m relay

Pepa Dimitrova Pavlova (Bulgarian: Пепа Павлова) (born 1 January 1961) is a retired Bulgarian sprinter who specialized in the 400 metres.

She finished eighth in the 4 x 400 metres relay at the 1983 World Championships, with teammates Tsvetanka Ilieva, Rositsa Stamenova and Yuliana Marinova.

Her personal best time was 51.40 seconds, achieved in August 1986 in Sofia.
