= 1989 European Cup "A" Final =

These are the full results of the 1989 European Cup "A" Final in athletics which was held on 5 and 6 August 1989 at the Gateshead International Stadium in Gateshead, United Kingdom.

== Team standings ==
Men
Pos.	Nation	Points
1	Great Britain	115
2	East Germany	103
3	Soviet Union	101
4	Italy	95
5	France	95
6	West Germany	91
7	Czechoslovakia	63
8	Spain	54

Women
Pos.	Nation	Points
1	East Germany	120
2	Soviet Union	95
3	Great Britain	84
4	West Germany	79
5	Romania	72
6	Poland	56
7	Bulgaria	43
8	Czechoslovakia	26

East and West Germany competed separately for the last time being replaced by the unified German team from the 1991 edition. As a result, only one team had to be relegated from the "A" Final and two teams were promoted from the "B" Final.

== Men's results ==
=== 100 metres ===
5 August
Wind: -1.8 m/s

Rank	Lane	Name	Nationality	Time	Notes	Points
1	2	Linford Christie	Great Britain	10.33		8
2	1	Daniel Sangouma	France	10.39		7
3	3	Vladimir Krylov	Soviet Union	10.43		6
4	4	Stefano Tilli	Italy	10.48		5
5	8	Sven Matthes	East Germany	10.51		4
6	5	Jiří Valík	Czechoslovakia	10.53		3
7	6	Andreas Maul	West Germany	10.63		2
8	7	José Javier Arqués	Spain	10.72		2

=== 200 metres ===
6 August
Wind: +0.1 m/s

Rank	Name	Nationality	Time	Notes	Points
1	John Regis	Great Britain	20.62		8
2	Stefano Tilli	Italy	20.66		7
3	Daniel Sangouma	France	20.83		6
4	Vladimir Krylov	Soviet Union	20.97		5
5	Jiří Valík	Czechoslovakia	21.23		4
6	Steffen Schwabe	East Germany	21.25		3
7	Miguel Ángel Gómez	Spain	21.57		2
8	Wolfgang Haupt	West Germany	21.61		1

=== 400 metres ===
5 August

Rank	Name	Nationality	Time	Notes	Points
1	Edgar Itt	West Germany	45.43		8
2	Jens Carlowitz	East Germany	45.44		7
3	Cayetano Cornet	Spain	45.82		6
4	Roberto Ribaud	Italy	46.00		5
5	Brian Whittle	Great Britain	46.19		4
6	Luboš Balošák	Czechoslovakia	46.30		3
7	Olivier Noirot	France	46.54		2
8	Vyacheslav Kocheryagin	Soviet Union	46.89		1

=== 800 metres ===
6 August

Rank	Name	Nationality	Time	Notes	Points
1	Tom McKean	Great Britain	1:46.94		8
2	Peter Braun	West Germany	1:47.53		7
3	Hauke Fuhlbrügge	East Germany	1:48.20		6
4	Hervé Phélippeau	France	1:48.28		5
5	Tonino Viali	Italy	1:48.36		4
6	Tomás de Teresa	Spain	1:48.58		3
7	Andrey Sudnik	Soviet Union	1:49.38		2
8	Marcel Theer	Czechoslovakia	1:51.20		1

=== 1500 metres ===
5 August

Rank	Name	Nationality	Time	Notes	Points
1	Pascal Thiébaut	France	3:48.05		8
2	Sergey Afanasyev	Soviet Union	3:48.35		7
3	Gennaro Di Napoli	Italy	3:48.61		6
4	Jens-Peter Herold	East Germany	3:48.70		5
5	Tony Morrell	Great Britain	3:48.85		4
6	Pavel Šourek	Czechoslovakia	3:51.35		3
7	José Luis González	Spain	4:26.20		2
	Dieter Baumann	West Germany	DQ		0

=== 5000 metres ===
6 August

Rank	Name	Nationality	Time	Notes	Points
1	Salvatore Antibo	Italy	13:43.84		8
2	Jack Buckner	Great Britain	13:44.77		7
3	Mikhail Dasko	Soviet Union	13:47.56		6
4	Pascal Thiébaut	France	14:00.59		5
5	Alejandro Gómez	Spain	14:03.98		4
6	Steffen Brand	West Germany	14:11.14		3
7	Hansjörg Kunze	East Germany	14:25.59		2
8	Pavel Michálek	Czechoslovakia	14:56.90		1

=== 10,000 metres ===
5 August

Rank	Name	Nationality	Time	Notes	Points
1	Francesco Panetta	Italy	28:27.02		8
2	Tim Hutchings	Great Britain	28:27.21		7
3	José Manuel Albentosa	Spain	28:29.78		6
4	Jean-Louis Prianon	France	28:42.71		5
5	Stephan Freigang	East Germany	29:28.13		4
6	Ravil Kashapov	Soviet Union	29:32.47		3
7	Martin Vrábeľ	Czechoslovakia	30:07.64		2
8	Markus Pingpank	West Germany	30:28.29		1

=== 110 metres hurdles ===
6 August
Wind: -2.9 m/s

Rank	Lane	Name	Nationality	Time	Notes	Points
1	6	Colin Jackson	Great Britain	13.56		8
2	7	Vladimir Shishkin	Soviet Union	13.76		7
3	2	Florian Schwarthoff	West Germany	13.88		6
4	5	Philippe Tourret	France	14.04		5
5	4	Holger Pohland	East Germany	14.11		4
6	2	Carlos Sala	Spain	14.16		3
7	1	Jiří Hudec	Czechoslovakia	14.25		2
8	8	Mauro Re	Italy	14.33		1

=== 400 metres hurdles ===
5 August

Rank	Lane	Name	Nationality	Time	Notes	Points
1	7	Kriss Akabusi	Great Britain	48.95		8
2	3	Harald Schmid	West Germany	49.26		7
3	8	Vladimir Budko	Soviet Union	49.60		6
4	2	Jozef Kucej	Czechoslovakia	50.10		5
5	4	José Alonso	Spain	50.20		4
6	6	Philippe Gonigam	France	50.95		3
7	5	Hans-Jürgen Ende	East Germany	51.04		2
8	1	Fabrizio Mori	Italy	51.09		1

=== 3000 metres steeplechase ===
6 August

Rank	Name	Nationality	Time	Notes	Points
1	Alessandro Lambruschini	Italy	8:34.06		8
2	Hagen Melzer	East Germany	8:34.90		7
3	Raymond Pannier	France	8:35.33		6
4	Tom Hanlon	Great Britain	8:35.81		5
5	Jiří Švec	Czechoslovakia	8:37.41		4
6	Valeriy Vandyak	Soviet Union	8:38.46		3
7	Jens Volkmann	West Germany	8:41.99		2
8	Benito Nogales	Spain	8:44.73		1

=== 4 × 100 metres relay ===
5 August

Rank	Lane	Nation	Athletes	Time	Note	Points
1	8	Great Britain	Tony Jarrett, John Regis, Marcus Adam, Linford Christie	38.67		8
2	7	France	Max Morinière, Daniel Sangouma, Gilles Quénéhervé, Bruno Marie-Rose	38.46		7
3	2	Italy	Antonio Ullo, Sandro Floris, Pierfrancesco Pavoni, Stefano Tilli	38.98		6
4	6	East Germany	Michael Huke, Steffen Bringmann, Steffen Schwabe, Sven Matthes	39.02		5
5	1	Soviet Union	Andrey Razin, Vladimir Krylov, Andrey Fedoriv, Vitaliy Savin	39.16		4
6	3	Czechoslovakia	Jiří Hudec, Jiří Mezihorák, Radek Stupka, Jiří Valík	39.50		3
7	5	Spain	José Javier Arqués, Miguel Ángel García, Valentín Rocandio, Miguel Ángel Gómez	39.86		2
	4	West Germany	Volker Westhagemann, Andreas Maul, Peter Klein, Wolfgang Haupt	DNF		0

=== 4 × 400 metres relay ===
6 August

Rank	Nation	Athletes	Time	Note	Points
1	Great Britain	Peter Crampton, Kriss Akabusi, Todd Bennett, Brian Whittle	3:03.16		8
2	West Germany	Klaus Just, Mark Henrich, Carsten Köhrbrück, Ralf Lubke	3:03.33		7
3	East Germany	Torsten Odebrett, Thomas Miethig, Jens Carlowitz, Thomas Schönlebe	3:04.21		6
4	France	Olivier Noirot, Jean-Claude Lauret, Aldo Canti, Jacques Farraudière	3:04.32		5
5	Spain	Antonio Sánchez, Cayetano Cornet, José Alonso, Moisés Hernández	3:04.71		4
6	Italy	Andrea Montanari, Marcello Pantone, Riccardo Cardone, Roberto Ribaud	3:06.03		3
7	Soviet Union	Aleksey Bazarov, Valeriy Starodubtsev, Vyacheslav Kocheryagin, Aleksandr Kurochkin	3:06.78		2
8	Czechoslovakia	Jiří Janoušek, Luboš Balošák, Miroslav Vavák, Jozef Kucej	3:10.50		1

=== High jump ===
5 August

Rank	Name	Nationality	2.05	2.10	2.15	2.20	2.23	2.26	2.29	2.32	2.35	Result	Notes	Points
1	Dalton Grant	Great Britain	–	–	–	o	–	o	o	o	xxx	2.32		8
2	Rudolf Povarnitsyn	Soviet Union	–	–	o	o	o	o	o	xo	xxx	2.32		7
3	Róbert Ruffíni	Czechoslovakia	–	o	o	o	o	o	xo	xx–	x	2.29		6
4	Gerd Wessig	East Germany	–	o	o	o	o	o	x–	xx		2.26		5
5	Arturo Ortiz	Spain	–	o	o	xo	o	xx–	x			2.23		4
6	Ralf Sonn	West Germany	–	o	o	o	xxo	xxx				2.23		3
7	Marcello Benvenuti	Italy	–	o	xxo	o	xxo	xxx				2.23		2
8	Jean-Charles Gicquel	France	o	–	xo	o	xxx					2.20		1

=== Pole vault ===
6 August

Rank	Name	Nationality	4.80	5.00	5.10	5.20	5.30	5.40	5.50	5.60	5.70	5.90	Result	Notes	Points
1	Rodion Gataullin	Soviet Union	–	–	–	–	–	–	–	–	o	xxx	5.70		8
2	Bernhard Zintl	West Germany	–	–	–	–	o	–	o	xxx			5.50		7
3	Uwe Langhammer	East Germany	–	–	–	o	–	o	xxx				5.40		6
4	Philippe Collet	France	–	–	–	–	–	xo		xxx			5.40		5
5	Zdeněk Lubenský	Czechoslovakia	–	–	–	xo	–	xxo		xxx			5.40		4
6	Javier García	Spain	–	–	–	–	o	–	xxx				5.30		3
7	Marco Andreini	Italy	–	xo	–	o	o	xxx					5.30		2
8	Mike Edwards	Great Britain	o	–	o	xxx							5.10		1

=== Long jump ===
5 August

Rank	Name	Nationality	#1	#2	#3	#4	#5	#6	Result	Notes	Points
1	Vladimir Ratushkov	Soviet Union	7.93	x	x	7.77	x	8.09	8.09		8
2	Christian Thomas	West Germany	5.70	7.80	x	x	8.05	x	8.05		7
3	Stewart Faulkner	Great Britain	7.57	7.88	7.97	x	x	7.84	7.97		6
4	Giovanni Evangelisti	Italy	7.96	x	7.81	7.95	7.79	7.95	7.96		5
5	Marco Delonge	East Germany	7.78	7.71	7.80	7.73	7.86	x	7.86		4
6	Norbert Brige	France	7.57	7.74	7.57	7.30	7.43	7.40	7.74		3
7	Antonio Corgos	Spain	7.58	x	x	7.70	7.69	–	7.70		2
8	Milan Gombala	Czechoslovakia	7.65	x	7.35	7.65	7.54	x	7.65		1

=== Triple jump ===
6 August

Rank	Name	Nationality	#1	#2	#3	#4	#5	#6	Result	Notes	Points
1	Oleg Sakirkin	Soviet Union	16.73	16.99	17.18	–	16.76	17.01	17.18		8
2	Wolfgang Zinser	West Germany	16.17	16.45	16.21	x	16.46	16.71	16.71		7
3	Dario Badinelli	Italy	15.86	16.32	16.27	16.38	x	16.50	16.50		6
4	Dirk Gamlin	East Germany	16.31	16.21	16.45	16.40	15.56	16.17	16.45		5
5	Pierre Camara	France	15.86	x	16.41	x	x	x	16.41		4
6	Jaroslav Mrštík	Czechoslovakia	16.29	x	x	16.31	x	x	16.31		3
7	Vernon Samuels	Great Britain	16.02	x	x	16.11	15.84	16.24	16.24		2
8	Iñaki González	Spain	x	x	x	x	15.01	14.54	15.01		1

=== Shot put ===
5 August

Rank	Name	Nationality	#1	#2	#3	#4	#5	#6	Result	Notes	Points
1	Ulf Timmermann	East Germany	20.96	21.51	21.42	21.36	21.56	21.72	21.72		8
2	Karsten Stolz	West Germany	19.91	20.45	20.08	x	19.58	19.85	20.45		7
	Aleksandr Bagach	Soviet Union	19.79	x	19.80	20.08	20.08	x	~~20.08~~	D, doping	0
3	Alessandro Andrei	Italy	19.35	20.03	19.73	19.53	19.65	19.53	20.03		6
4	Luc Viudès	France	18.10	18.43	18.06	18.21	19.26	x	19.26		5
5	Remigius Machura	Czechoslovakia	17.92	18.07	18.46	x	18.28	x	18.46		4
6	Simon Williams	Great Britain	17.79	17.72	x	17.79	18.26	17.96	18.26		3
7	Martín Vara	Spain	15.68	x	x	15.68	x	x	15.68		2

=== Discus throw ===
6 August

Rank	Name	Nationality	#1	#2	#3	#4	#5	#6	Result	Notes	Points
1	Jürgen Schult	East Germany	65.56	64.08	64.94	66.44	65.42	66.54	66.54		8
2	Romas Ubartas	Soviet Union	63.22	62.00	61.60	63.52	x	63.98	63.98		7
3	Rolf Danneberg	West Germany	63.12	61.38	62.64	62.98	x	61.48	63.12		6
4	Luciano Zerbini	Italy	x	56.92	57.50	58.52	x	61.38	61.38		5
5	Géjza Valent	Czechoslovakia	61.08	60.08	60.44	60.44	60.92	x	61.08		4
6	Patrick Journoud	France	56.34	55.80	x	58.04	57.58	60.00	60.00		3
7	David Martínez	Spain	55.00	57.40	x	56.24	x	59.42	59.42		2
8	Paul Mardle	Great Britain	57.96	55.48	x	56.24	56.52	56.44	57.96		1

=== Hammer throw ===
6 August

Rank	Name	Nationality	#1	#2	#3	#4	#5	#6	Result	Notes	Points
1	Heinz Weis	West Germany	78.10	77.52	79.86	78.90	79.24	77.38	79.86		8
2	Igor Astapkovich	Soviet Union	77.26	77.58	76.04	79.68	76.94	78.62	79.68		7
3	Ralf Haber	East Germany	76.26	x	77.48	77.76	75.44	74.22	77.76		6
4	Raphaël Piolanti	France	x	69.88	72.50	71.76	x	x	72.50		5
5	Enrico Sgrulletti	Italy	x	x	67.10	72.22	x	69.62	72.22		4
6	Shane Peacock	Great Britain	65.88	67.32	69.14	67.82	x	67.22	69.14		3
7	František Vrbka	Czechoslovakia	66.66	67.40	68.94	x	x	66.78	68.94		2
8	Raúl Jimeno	Spain	62.84	x	61.06	63.56	62.92	x	63.56		1

=== Javelin throw ===
5 August

Rank	Name	Nationality	#1	#2	#3	#4	#5	#6	Result	Notes	Points
1	Steve Backley	Great Britain	79.62	80.22	77.18	82.92	82.56	x	82.92		8
2	Jan Železný	Czechoslovakia	79.44	x	x	76.08	–	x	79.44		7
3	Volker Hadwich	East Germany	74.46	79.34	79.38	77.24	77.68	76.56	79.38		6
4	Pascal Lefèvre	France	76.40	77.36	74.66	72.56	72.74	71.48	77.36		5
5	Viktor Zaytsev	Soviet Union	77.02	74.88	73.38	77.24	75.36	76.38	77.24		4
6	Fabio De Gaspari	Italy	76.52	x	72.50	74.08	71.58	–	76.52		3
7	Klaus-Peter Schneider	West Germany	75.02	75.98	73.98	x	x	71.60	75.98		2
8	Enric Bassols	Spain	63.70	61.92	62.30	61.34	62.86	63.22	63.70		1

== Women's results ==
=== 100 metres ===
5 August

Rank	Lane	Name	Nationality	Time	Notes	Points
1	1	Katrin Krabbe	East Germany	11.14		8
2	8	Paula Dunn	Great Britain	11.24		7
3	5	Irina Sergeyeva	Soviet Union	11.26		6
4	7	Ulrike Sarvari	West Germany	11.29		5
5	2	Joanna Smolarek	Poland	11.64		4
6	4	Nadezhda Georgieva	Bulgaria	11.70		3
7	3	Monika Špičková	Czechoslovakia	11.77		2
8	6	Liliana Năstase	Romania	11.85		1

=== 200 metres ===
6 August
Wind: -1.8 m/s

Rank	Lane	Name	Nationality	Time	Notes	Points
1	2	Silke Möller	East Germany	23.00		8
2	1	Paula Dunn	Great Britain	23.45		7
3	3	Ewa Kasprzyk	Poland	23.72		6
4	8	Andrea Thomas	West Germany	23.74		5
5	6	Irina Sergeyeva	Soviet Union	23.85		4
6	7	Iolanda Oanță	Romania	23.93		3
7	5	Nadezhda Georgieva	Bulgaria	24.27		2
8	4	Monika Špičková	Czechoslovakia	24.47		1

=== 400 metres ===
5 August

Rank	Lane	Name	Nationality	Time	Notes	Points
1	3	Grit Breuer	East Germany	50.52		8
2	2	Linda Keough	Great Britain	51.66		7
3	1	Helga Arendt	West Germany	51.80		6
4	7	Marina Shmonina	Soviet Union	51.93		5
5	6	Milena Zaracheva	Bulgaria	53.10		4
6	4	Elżbieta Kilińska	Poland	53.60		3
7	8	Daniela Gamalie	Romania	53.87		2
8	5	Taťána Slaninová	Czechoslovakia	54.50		1

=== 800 metres ===
5 August

Rank	Name	Nationality	Time	Notes	Points
1	Doina Melinte	Romania	1:58.04		8
2	Sigrun Wodars	East Germany	1:58.55		7
3	Dalia Matusevičienė	Soviet Union	1:59.74		6
4	Gabriela Lesch	West Germany	2:00.21		5
5	Diane Edwards	Great Britain	2:01.13		4
6	Gabriela Sedláková	Czechoslovakia	2:01.66		3
7	Nikolina Shtereva	Bulgaria	2:03.06		2
8	Dorota Buczkowska	Poland	2:03.62		1

=== 1500 metres ===
6 August

Rank	Name	Nationality	Time	Notes	Points
1	Doina Melinte	Romania	4:05.83		8
2	Yvonne Mai	East Germany	4:06.50		7
3	Svetlana Kitova	Soviet Union	4:07.62		6
4	Małgorzata Rydz	Poland	4:08.40		5
5	Nikolina Shtereva	Bulgaria	4:08.82		4
6	Bev Nicholson	Great Britain	4:09.32		3
7	Gabriele Schwarzbauer	West Germany	4:13.55		2
8	Milena Strnadová	Czechoslovakia	4:26.88		1

=== 3000 metres ===
5 August

Rank	Name	Nationality	Time	Notes	Points
1	Paula Ivan	Romania	8:38.48		8
2	Yvonne Murray	Great Britain	8:44.34		7
3	Natalya Artyomova	Soviet Union	9:03.39		6
4	Ellen Kiessling	East Germany	9:04.26		5
5	Grażyna Kowina	Poland	9:05.75		4
6	Sabine Kunkel	West Germany	9:05.89		3
7	Radka Naplatanova	Bulgaria	9:10.09		2
8	Alena Močáriová	Czechoslovakia	9:31.25		1

=== 10,000 metres ===
6 August

Rank	Name	Nationality	Time	Notes	Points
1	Kathrin Ullrich	East Germany	32:17.88		8
2	Viorica Ghican	Romania	32:41.34		7
3	Angela Pain	Great Britain	32:42.84		6
4	Natalya Sorokivskaya	Soviet Union	33:10.86		5
5	Wanda Panfil	Poland	33:18.57		4
6	Kerstin Preßler	West Germany	33:33.22		3
7	Alena Peterková	Czechoslovakia	33:40.31		2
8	Rumyana Panovska	Bulgaria	33:55.74		1

=== 100 metres hurdles ===
6 August
Wind: +1.8 m/s

Rank	Name	Nationality	Time	Notes	Points
1	Cornelia Oschkenat	East Germany	12.74		8
2	Claudia Zaczkiewicz	West Germany	12.82		7
3	Yelizaveta Chernyshova	Soviet Union	12.85		6
4	Mihaela Pogăcean	Romania	13.04		5
5	Ginka Zagorcheva	Bulgaria	13.07		4
6	Kay Morley	Great Britain	13.19		3
7	Anna Leszczyńska	Poland	13.86		2
8	Blanka Hladká	Czechoslovakia	14.07		1

=== 400 metres hurdles ===
5 August

Rank	Lane	Name	Nationality	Time	Notes	Points
1	8	Petra Krug	East Germany	54.72		8
2	7	Sally Gunnell	Great Britain	54.98		7
3	4	Tatyana Ledovskaya	Soviet Union	55.35		6
4	6	Ulrike Heinz	West Germany	55.77		5
5	5	Cristieana Matei	Romania	56.35		4
6	1	Beata Knapczyk	Poland	56.99		3
7	2	Zuzana Machotková	Czechoslovakia	57.71		2
8	3	Teodora Khristova	Bulgaria	1:01.11		1

=== 4 × 100 metres relay ===
5 August

Rank	Lane	Nation	Athletes	Time	Note	Points
1	6	East Germany	Silke Möller, Katrin Krabbe, Kerstin Behrendt, Sabine Günther	41.87		8
2	2	Soviet Union	Nadezhda Rashchupkina, Galina Malchugina, Natalya Kovtun, Natalya Pomoshchnikova-Voronova	42.85		7
3	4	West Germany	Andrea Hagen, Ulrike Sarvari, Andrea Thomas, Karin Janke	43.64		6
4	5	Great Britain	Stephi Douglas, Louise Stuart, Sallyanne Short, Paula Dunn	44.08		5
5	7	Poland	Małgorzata Skotowska, Urszula Jaros, Joanna Smolarek, Ewa Kasprzyk	44.12		4
6	1	Bulgaria	Krasimira Pencheva, Tsvetanka Ilieva, Nadezhda Georgieva, Katya Ilieva	44.62		3
7	3	Romania	Iolanda Oanță, Liliana Năstase, Mihaela Pogăcean, Marieta Ilcu	44.72		2
	8	Czechoslovakia	Monika Špičková, Daniela Weegerová, Renata Černochová, Andrea Zsideková	DNF		2

=== 4 × 400 metres relay ===
6 August

Rank	Nation	Athletes	Time	Note	Points
1	East Germany	Sigrun Wodars, Kathrin Schreiter, Christine Wachtel, Grit Breuer	3:24.08		8
2	Soviet Union	Marina Shmonina, Lyudmila Dzhigalova, Yelena Golesheva, Yelena Ruzina	3:24.75		7
3	Great Britain	Linda Keough, Jennifer Stoute, Angela Piggford, Sally Gunnell	3:26.54		6
4	West Germany	Karin Janke, Andrea Thomas, Gabriela Lesch, Helga Arendt	3:26.56		5
5	Poland	Karin Janke, Renata Sosin, Barbara Grzywocz, Beata Knapczyk, Elżbieta Kilińska	3:30.76		4
6	Romania	Cristieana Matei, Violeta Beclea, Daniela Gamalie, Iolanda Oanță	3:32.56		3
7	Bulgaria	Daniela Spasova, Yuliana Marinova, Yordanka Stoyanova, Milena Zaracheva	3:33.83		2
8	Czechoslovakia	Daniela Weegerová, Helena Dziurová, Zuzana Machotková, Naděžda Tomšová	3:34.92		1

=== High jump ===
6 August

Rank	Name	Nationality	1.70	1.75	1.80	1.85	1.88	1.91	1.94	1.97	2.00	2.03	Result	Notes	Points
1	Alina Astafei	Romania	–	o	o	o	o	o	o	xo	o	xxx	2.00		8
2	Tamara Bykova	Soviet Union	–	–	o	o	o	o	xo	o	xxx		1.97		7
3	Heike Balck	East Germany	–	o	xo	o	o	xo	o	xxx			1.94		6
4	Jolanta Komsa	Poland	–	o	o	o	xxx						1.85		3
4	Heike Henkel	West Germany	–	–	o	o	xxx						1.85		3
4	Jayne Barnetson	Great Britain	o	o	o	o	xxx						1.85		3
7	Dimitrinka Borislavova	Bulgaria	–	o	o	xo	xxx						1.85		2
8	Šárka Nováková	Czechoslovakia	o	xo	xxo	xxo	xxx						1.85		1

=== Long jump ===
6 August

Rank	Name	Nationality	#1	#2	#3	#4	#5	#6	Result	Notes	Points
1	Galina Chistyakova	Soviet Union	6.98	7.07	6.81	7.10w	6.74	6.66	7.10		8
2	Helga Radtke	East Germany	6.59	6.89	x	6.59	6.82	6.71	6.89		7
3	Fiona May	Great Britain	6.88w	x	6.80	6.68	6.45	x	6.88w		6
4	Marieta Ilcu	Romania	6.74	6.87	6.83	6.81	x	6.54	6.87		5
5	Agata Karczmarek	Poland	6.52	6.48	x	4.50	6.28	x	6.52		4
6	Sabine Braun	West Germany	4.33	x	6.38	2.83	5.70	x	6.38		3
7	Tsetska Kancheva	Bulgaria	6.07w	5.89	6.13	6.12	5.99	5.99	6.13		2
8	Marcela Podracká	Czechoslovakia	5.82	5.65	5.83	5.73w	3.83	5.70	5.83		1

=== Shot put ===
6 August

Rank	Name	Nationality	#1	#2	#3	#4	#5	#6	Result	Notes	Points
1	Heike Hartwig	East Germany	20.59	x	19.90	19.97	19.82	20.06	20.59		8
2	Claudia Losch	West Germany	20.17	18.38	19.92	19.61	19.85	19.46	20.17		7
3	Larisa Peleshenko	Soviet Union	18.80	19.32	x	19.14	x	19.23	19.32		6
4	Judy Oakes	Great Britain	18.22	18.39	x	18.29	x	18.39	18.39		5
5	Soňa Vašíčková	Czechoslovakia	17.39	17.91	x	x	x	x	17.91		4
6	Svetla Mitkova	Bulgaria	17.43	17.20	x	x	17.61	16.89	17.61		3
7	Livia Mehes	Romania	17.25	17.13	17.25	x	x	17.06	17.25		2
8	Małgorzata Wolska	Poland	x	16.06	x	16.29	x	16.55	16.55		1

=== Discus throw ===
5 August

Rank	Name	Nationality	#1	#2	#3	#4	#5	#6	Result	Notes	Points
1	Ilke Wyludda	East Germany	71.64	71.70	68.76	71.34	71.24	73.04	73.04		8
2	Tsvetanka Khristova	Bulgaria	62.26	60.44	x	59.46	61.38	60.18	62.26		7
3	Dagmar Galler	West Germany	60.46	x	56.60	54.76	57.44	58.56	60.46		6
4	Olga Davydova	Soviet Union	58.04	58.74	x	59.62	x	x	59.62		5
5	Elisabeta Neamțu	Romania	55.50	x	57.92	54.80	x	55.68	57.92		4
6	Renata Katewicz	Poland	56.60	54.08	55.24	56.18	x	x	56.60		3
7	Martina Polišenská	Czechoslovakia	56.60	54.52	54.64	52.74	53.70	55.68	56.60		2
8	Jackie McKernan	Great Britain	51.78	x	x	x	52.52	49.40	52.52		1

=== Javelin throw ===
6 August – Old model

Rank	Name	Nationality	#1	#2	#3	#4	#5	#6	Result	Notes	Points
1	Petra Felke	East Germany	66.90	x	66.92	x	59.50	62.94	66.92		8
2	Brigitte Graune	West Germany	62.04	59.30	59.80	–	–	58.02	62.04		7
3	Tessa Sanderson	Great Britain	56.60	x	x	58.08	59.72	58.76	59.72		6
4	Natalya Shikolenko	Soviet Union	54.54	59.14	57.76	x	x	56.92	59.14		5
5	Mariola Dankiewicz	Poland	55.22	54.16	58.56	x	x	55.94	58.56		4
6	Elena Révayová	Czechoslovakia	51.94	47.60	51.40	55.60	52.52	54.02	55.60		3
7	Aurica Bujnița	Romania	44.98	x	53.40	x	x	53.40	53.40		2
8	Sonya Radicheva	Bulgaria	50.56	52.08	50.76	52.14	51.96	x	52.14		1
