= 1991 World Championships in Athletics – Women's 4 × 100 metres relay =

These are the official results of the Women's 4 × 100 metres event at the 1991 IAAF World Championships in Tokyo, Japan. Their final was held on Sunday September 1, 1991.

Merlene Frazer, at 17 years 248 days, is, as 2017, the youngest World Champion ever.

== Schedule ==
- All times are Japan Standard Time (UTC+9)

Semi-Final
31.08.1991 – 18:20h
Final
01.09.1991 – 16:15h

== Final ==
RANK	NATION	ATHLETES	TIME
	Jamaica (JAM)	• Dahlia Duhaney • Juliet Cuthbert • Beverly McDonald • Merlene Ottey	41.94
	Soviet Union (URS)	• Natalya Kovtun • Galina Malchugina • Yelena Vinogradova • Irina Privalova	42.20
	Germany (GER)	• Grit Breuer • Katrin Krabbe • Sabine Richter • Heike Drechsler	42.33
4.	Nigeria (NGR)	• Beatrice Utondu • Rufina Ubah • Christy Opara-Thompson • Mary Onyali	42.77
5.	France (FRA)	• Laurence Bily • Maguy Nestoret • Valérie Jean-Charles • Marie-José Pérec	43.34
6.	Cuba (CUB)	• Eusebia Riquelme • Aliuska López • Julia Duporty • Liliana Allen	43.75
7.	Italy (ITA)	• Marisa Masullo • Donatella Dal Bianco • Daniela Ferrian • Rossella Tarolo	43.76
8.	Australia (AUS)	• Monique Dunstan • Kathy Sambell • Melissa Moore • Kerry Johnson	43.79

== Semifinals ==
- Held on Saturday 1991-08-31

=== Heat 1 ===
RANK	NATION	ATHLETES	TIME
1.	Jamaica (JAM)	• Dahlia Duhaney • Juliet Cuthbert • Beverly McDonald • Merlene Frazer	42.63
2.	Nigeria (NGR)	• Beatrice Utondu • Rufina Ubah • Christy Opara-Thompson • Mary Onyali	42.72
3.	Soviet Union (URS)	• Natalya Kovtun • Galina Malchugina • Yelena Vinogradova • Irina Privalova	42.78
4.	France (FRA)	• Laurence Bily • Maguy Nestoret • Valérie Jean-Charles • Marie-José Pérec	43.05
5.	Australia (AUS)	• Monique Dunstan • Kathy Sambell • Melissa Moore • Kerry Johnson	43.34
6.	Great Britain (GBR)	• Stephanie Douglas • Beverly Kinch • Simmone Jacobs • Paula Thomas	43.43
7.	Bulgaria (BUL)	• Petya Pendareva • Tsvetanka Ilieva • Nadezhda Georgieva • Valya Demireva	44.17

=== Heat 2 ===
RANK	NATION	ATHLETES	TIME
1.	Germany (GER)	• Grit Breuer • Katrin Krabbe • Sabine Richter • Heike Drechsler	41.91
2.	Cuba (CUB)	• Eusebia Riquelme • Aliuska López • Julia Duporty • Liliana Allen	43.31
3.	Italy (ITA)	• Marisa Masullo • Donatella Dal Bianco • Daniela Ferrian • Rossella Tarolo	43.71
4.	Finland (FIN)	• Marja Tennivaara • Sisko Hanhijoki • Sanna Hernesniemi • Minna Painilainen	43.73
5.	Spain (ESP)	• Patricia Morales • Cristina Castro • María del Carmen García Campero • Sandra Myers	44.08
6.	Japan (JPN)	• Noriko Masaki • Kazue Kakinuma • Toshie Kitada • Ayako Nomura	44.85
–	United States (USA)	• Carlette Guidry • Esther Jones • Dannette Young • Evelyn Ashford	DNF

== See also ==
- 1990 Women's European Championships 4 × 100 m Relay (Split)
- 1992 Women's Olympic 4 × 100 m Relay (Barcelona)
- 1993 Women's World Championships 4 × 100 m Relay (Stuttgart)
