= 1990 European Athletics Indoor Championships – Women's 60 metres =

The women's 60 metres event at the 1990 European Athletics Indoor Championships was held in Kelvin Hall on 3 March.

== Medalists ==
Gold	Silver	Bronze
Ulrike Sarvari; West Germany	Laurence Bily; France	Nelli Fiere-Cooman; Netherlands

== Result ==
=== Heats ===
First 2 from each heat (Q) and the next 4 fastest (q) qualified for the semifinals.

Rank	Heat	Name	Nationality	Time	Notes
1	4	Laurence Bily	France	7.16	Q
2	3	Ulrike Sarvari	West Germany	7.21	Q
3	2	Nelli Fiere-Cooman	Netherlands	7.22	Q
4	1	Patricia Girard	France	7.30	Q
4	3	Kerstin Behrendt	East Germany	7.30	Q
6	2	Odiah Sidibé	France	7.31	Q
7	3	Monika Špičková	Czechoslovakia	7.35	q
8	2	Marisa Masullo	Italy	7.36	q
8	2	Sisko Hanhijoki	Finland	7.36	q
8	4	Paula Dunn	Great Britain	7.36	Q
11	3	Sabine Tröger	Austria	7.37	q
12	1	Stephi Douglas	Great Britain	7.38	Q
13	1	Mirela Dulgheru	Romania	7.38	
14	4	Sonia Vigati	Italy	7.41	
15	2	Paraskevi Patoulidou	Greece	7.44	
16	1	Lucrécia Jardim	Portugal	7.48	
17	3	Sara Wüest	Switzerland	7.49	
18	1	Yolanda Díaz	Spain	7.62	
	4	Bev Kinch	Great Britain	DNF	

=== Semifinals ===
First 2 from each semifinal (Q) and the next 2 fastest (q) qualified for the final.

Rank	Heat	Name	Nationality	Time	Notes
1	2	Ulrike Sarvari	West Germany	7.13	Q
2	1	Laurence Bily	France	7.15	Q
3	1	Nelli Fiere-Cooman	Netherlands	7.17	Q
4	2	Sisko Hanhijoki	Finland	7.25	Q
5	2	Patricia Girard	France	7.26	q
6	2	Kerstin Behrendt	East Germany	7.29	q
7	2	Paula Dunn	Great Britain	7.30	
8	2	Sabine Tröger	Austria	7.31	
9	1	Stephi Douglas	Great Britain	7.32	
10	1	Odiah Sidibé	France	7.33	
11	1	Monika Špičková	Czechoslovakia	7.34	
12	1	Marisa Masullo	Italy	7.41	

=== Final ===
Rank	Lane	Name	Nationality	Time	Notes
1st place, gold medalist(s)	3	Ulrike Sarvari	West Germany	7.10	
2nd place, silver medalist(s)	2	Laurence Bily	France	7.13	
3rd place, bronze medalist(s)	4	Nelli Fiere-Cooman	Netherlands	7.14	
4	5	Patricia Girard	France	7.19	
5	1	Sisko Hanhijoki	Finland	7.23	
6	6	Kerstin Behrendt	East Germany	7.28	
