= 1989 European Cup (athletics) =

- Dates: 5–6 August
- Host city: Gateshead, United Kingdom
- Venue: Gateshead International Stadium
- Level: Senior
- Type: Outdoor
- Events: 36

The 1989 European Cup was the 12th edition of the European Cup of athletics.

The "A" Finals were held in Gateshead, Great Britain. The first two teams qualified for the 1989 IAAF World Cup.

== "A" Final ==
Held on 5 and 6 August in Gateshead, United Kingdom

=== Team standings ===
Men
Pos.	Nation	Points
1	Great Britain	115
2	East Germany	103
3	Soviet Union	101
4	Italy	95
5	France	95
6	West Germany	91
7	Czechoslovakia	63
8	Spain	54

Women
Pos.	Nation	Points
1	East Germany	120
2	Soviet Union	95
3	Great Britain	84
4	West Germany	79
5	Romania	72
6	Poland	56
7	Bulgaria	43
8	Czechoslovakia	26

East and West Germany competed separately for the last time before being replaced by the unified German team from the 1991 edition. As a result, only one team had to be relegated from the "A" Final and two teams were promoted from the "B" Final.

=== Results summary ===
==== Men's events ====
Event	Gold		Silver		Bronze	
100 m (Wind: -1.8 m/s)	Linford Christie; Great Britain	10.33	Daniel Sangouma; France	10.39	Vladimir Krylov; Soviet Union	10.43
200 m (Wind: +0.1 m/s)	John Regis; Great Britain	20.62	Stefano Tilli; Italy	20.66	Daniel Sangouma; France	20.83
400 m	Edgar Itt; West Germany	45.43	Jens Carlowitz; East Germany	45.44	Cayetano Cornet; Spain	45.82
800 m	Tom McKean; Great Britain	1:46.94	Peter Braun; West Germany	1:47.53	Hauke Fuhlbrügge; East Germany	1:48.20
1500 m	Pascal Thiébaut; France	3:48.05	Sergey Afanasyev; Soviet Union	3:48.35	Gennaro Di Napoli; Italy	3:48.61
5000 m	Salvatore Antibo; Italy	13:43.84	Jack Buckner; Great Britain	13:44.77	Mikhail Dasko; Soviet Union	13:47.56
10,000 m	Francesco Panetta; Italy	28:27.02	Tim Hutchings; Great Britain	28:27.21	José Manuel Albentosa; Spain	28:29.78
3000 m steeplechase	Alessandro Lambruschini; Italy	8:34.06	Hagen Melzer; East Germany	8:34.90	Raymond Pannier; France	8:35.33
110 m hurdles (Wind: -2.9 m/s)	Colin Jackson; Great Britain	13.56	Vladimir Shishkin; Soviet Union	13.76	Florian Schwarthoff; West Germany	13.88
400 m hurdles	Kriss Akabusi; Great Britain	48.95	Harald Schmid; West Germany	49.26	Vladimir Budko; Soviet Union	49.60
4 × 100 m	Great Britain; Tony Jarrett; John Regis; Marcus Adam; Linford Christie	38.39	France; Max Morinière; Daniel Sangouma; Gilles Quénéhervé; Bruno Marie-Rose	38.46	Italy; Antonio Ullo; Sandro Floris; Pier Francesco Pavoni; Stefano Tilli	38.98
4 × 400 m	Great Britain; Peter Crampton; Kriss Akabusi; Todd Bennett; Brian Whittle	3:03.16	West Germany; Klaus Just; Mark Henrich; Carsten Köhrbrück; Ralf Lübke	3:03.33	East Germany; Torsten Odebrett; Thomas Miethig; Jens Carlowitz; Thomas Schönlebe	3:04.21
High jump	Dalton Grant; Great Britain	2.32	Rudolf Povarnitsyn; Soviet Union	2.32	Róbert Ruffíni; Czechoslovakia	2.29
Pole vault	Rodion Gataullin; Soviet Union	5.70	Bernhard Zintl; West Germany	5.50	Uwe Langhammer; East Germany	5.40
Long jump	Vladimir Ratushkov; Soviet Union	8.09	Christian Thomas; West Germany	8.05	Stewart Faulkner; Great Britain	7.97
Triple jump	Oleg Sakirkin; Soviet Union	17.18	Wolfgang Zinser; West Germany	16.71	Dario Badinelli; Italy	16.50
Shot put	Ulf Timmermann; East Germany	21.72	Karsten Stolz; West Germany	20.45	Alessandro Andrei; Italy	20.03
Discus throw	Jürgen Schult; East Germany	66.54	Romas Ubartas; Soviet Union	63.98	Rolf Danneberg; West Germany	63.12
Hammer throw	Heinz Weis; West Germany	79.86	Igor Astapkovich; Soviet Union	79.68	Ralf Haber; East Germany	77.76
Javelin throw	Steve Backley; Great Britain	82.92	Jan Železný; Czechoslovakia	79.44	Volker Hadwich; East Germany	79.38
WR world record | AR area record | CR championship record | GR games record | NR national record | OR Olympic record | PB personal best | SB season best | WL world leading (in a given season)

==== Women's events ====
Event	Gold		Silver		Bronze	
100 m (Wind: 0.0 m/s)	Katrin Krabbe; East Germany	11.14	Paula Dunn; Great Britain	11.24	Irina Sergeyeva; Soviet Union	11.26
200 m (Wind: -1.8 m/s)	Silke Möller; East Germany	23.00	Paula Dunn; Great Britain	23.45	Ewa Kasprzyk; Poland	23.72
400 m	Grit Breuer; East Germany	50.52	Linda Keough; Great Britain	51.66	Helga Arendt; West Germany	51.80
800 m	Doina Melinte; Romania	1:58.04	Sigrun Wodars; East Germany	1:58.55	Dalia Matusevičienė; Soviet Union	1:59.74
1500 m	Doina Melinte; Romania	4:05.83	Yvonne Mai; East Germany	4:06.50	Svetlana Kitova; Soviet Union	4:07.62
3000 m	Paula Ivan; Romania	8:38.48	Yvonne Murray; Great Britain	8:44.34	Natalya Artyomova; Soviet Union	9:03.39
10,000 m	Kathrin Ullrich; East Germany	32:17.88	Viorica Ghican; Romania	32:41.34	Angie Pain; Great Britain	32:42.84
100 m hurdles (Wind: +1.8 m/s)	Cornelia Oschkenat; East Germany	12.74	Claudia Zaczkiewicz; West Germany	12.82	Yelizaveta Chernyshova; Soviet Union	12.85
400 m hurdles	Petra Krug; East Germany	54.72	Sally Gunnell; Great Britain	54.98	Tatyana Ledovskaya; Soviet Union	55.35
4 × 100 m	East Germany; Silke Möller; Katrin Krabbe; Kerstin Behrendt; Sabine Günther	41.87	Soviet Union; Nadezhda Roshchupkina; Galina Malchugina; Natalya Kovtun; Natalya Voronova	42.85	West Germany; Andrea Hagen; Ulrike Sarvari; Andrea Thomas; Karin Janke	43.64
4 × 400 m	East Germany; Sigrun Wodars; Katrin Schreiter; Christine Wachtel; Grit Breuer	3:24.08	Soviet Union; Marina Shmonina; Lyudmila Dzhigalova; Yelena Golesheva; Yelena Ruzina	3:24.75	Great Britain; Linda Keough; Jennifer Stoute; Angela Piggford; Sally Gunnell	3:26.54
High jump	Alina Astafei; Romania	2.00	Tamara Bykova; Soviet Union	1.97	Heike Balck; East Germany	1.94
Long jump	Galina Chistyakova; Soviet Union	7.10w	Helga Radtke; East Germany	6.89	Fiona May; Great Britain	6.88w
Shot put	Heike Hartwig; East Germany	20.59	Claudia Losch; West Germany	20.17	Larisa Peleshenko; Soviet Union	19.32
Discus throw	Ilke Wyludda; East Germany	73.04	Tsvetanka Khristova; Bulgaria	62.26	Dagmar Galler; West Germany	60.46
Javelin throw	Petra Felke; East Germany	66.92	Brigitte Graune; West Germany	62.04	Tessa Sanderson; Great Britain	59.72
WR world record | AR area record | CR championship record | GR games record | NR national record | OR Olympic record | PB personal best | SB season best | WL world leading (in a given season)

== "B" Final ==
Both "B" finals held on 5 and 6 August

Men
Held in Brussels, Belgium

Pos.	Nation	Points
1	Bulgaria	107
2	Hungary	103.5
3	Poland	102
4	Sweden	102
5	Austria	87
6	Switzerland	81
7	Greece	74.5
8	Belgium	61

Women
Held in Strasbourg, France

Pos.	Nation	Points
1	France	95
2	Hungary	89
3	Finland	85
4	Italy	81
5	Switzerland	65.5
6	Spain	58.5
7	Sweden	53
8	Yugoslavia	49

Because of the 1990 reunification of Germany there was an extra spot in the highest division in 1991. Because of that, two teams were promoted from the "B" Finals.

== "C" Finals ==
All "C" finals held on 5 and 6 August

=== Men ===
"C1" Final
Held in Copenhagen, Denmark

Pos.	Nation	Points
1	Finland	79
2	Norway	72
3	Denmark	65
4	Turkey	46.5
5	Cyprus	36.5

"C2" Final
Held in Dublin, Ireland

Pos.	Nation	Points
1	Yugoslavia	72
2	Portugal	69
3	Netherlands	68
4	Ireland	52
5	Iceland	38

=== Women ===
"C1" Final
Held in Copenhagen, Denmark

Pos.	Nation	Points
1	Belgium	76
2	Norway	75
3	Austria	72
4	Denmark	45
5	Turkey	36
6	Cyprus	30

"C2" Final
Held in Dublin, Ireland

Pos.	Nation	Points
1	Netherlands	71
2	Greece	54
3	Portugal	51
4	Ireland	40
5	Iceland	24
