= Kooi =

Kooi, Kooij or Kooy is a Dutch surname (Dutch pronunciation: [koːi]). Translated as "cage", the name often referred to a pen or duck decoy, and originated with a herder, duck breeder/hunter, or cage maker. The forms Van der Kooi etc. mean "from the pen / duck decoy". In the Netherlands, the archaic spelling Kooij is most common, while it is usually rendered Kooy abroad. Notable people with the surname include:

Kooi(j)/Kooy

- Chris Kooy (born 1982), Canadian soccer midfielder
- Debbie Kooij (born 1968), Dutch cricketer
- Dick Kooy (born 1987), Dutch volleyball player
- Earl R. Kooi (1917–2003), American chemist, first to produce high fructose corn syrup
- Ellen Kooi (born 1962), Dutch artist and photographer
- Manfred Kooy (born 1970), Dutch Paralympic middle-distance runner
- Peter Kooij/Kooy (born 1954), Dutch bass singer

Van der Kooi(j)/Kooy

- Ben van der Kooi (born 1983/84), Dutch ultranationalist
- Derek van der Kooy (born 1952), Canadian neurobiologist
- Hessel van der Kooij (born 1955), Dutch pop singer
- Jan van der Kooi (born 1957), Dutch painter and draftsman
- Jorrit van der Kooi (born 1972), Dutch-born film and TV director and presenter
- Jos van der Kooy (born 1951), Dutch organist
- Jurjen van der Kooi (1943–2018), Dutch folklorist
- Karen van der Kooij (born 1963), Dutch sprinter
- Mike van der Kooy (born 1989), Dutch football defender
- Willem Bartel van der Kooi (1768–1836), Dutch portrait painter

== See also ==
- De Kooy (hamlet) and De Kooy Airfield, near Den Helder, Netherlands
- KOOI, a Texas radio station
- Kooiman and Kooijman, Dutch surnames with the same origin
- Alan Kooi Simpson (born 1931), US senator, son of Lorna Kooi
