= 1990 European Athletics Championships – Women's 100 metres =

Women's 100 metres at the 1990 European Athletics Championships
- Venue: Stadion Poljud
- Location: Split
- Dates: 27 August (heats); 28 August (semifinals & final)
- Competitors: 20 from 10 nations
- Winning time: 10.89

Medalists
gold medal	Katrin Krabbe	East Germany
silver medal	Silke Möller	East Germany
bronze medal	Kerstin Behrendt	East Germany

These are the official results of the Women's 100 metres event at the 1990 European Championships in Split, Yugoslavia, held at Stadion Poljud on 27 and 28 August 1990.

== Participation ==
According to an unofficial count, 20 athletes from 10 countries participated in the event.

- East Germany (3)
- Finland (2)
- France (3)
- Greece (1)
- Poland (1)
- Portugal (1)
- Soviet Union (3)
- Spain (1)
- Great Britain (3)
- West Germany (2)

== Results ==
=== Heats ===
27 August

==== Heat 1 ====
Rank	Name	Nationality	Time	Notes
1	Katrin Krabbe	East Germany	11.07	Q
2	Ulrike Sarvari	West Germany	11.53	Q
3	Bev Kinch	Great Britain	11.56	Q
4	Natalya Kovtun	Soviet Union	11.60	Q
5	Magali Simioneck	France	11.60	q
6	Cristina Castro	Spain	11.60	q
7	Sanna Hernesniemi	Finland	11.86	
			Wind: 0.0 m/s	

==== Heat 2 ====
Rank	Name	Nationality	Time	Notes
1	Laurence Bily	France	11.31	Q
2	Kerstin Behrendt	East Germany	11.45	Q
3	Nadezhda Roshchupkina	Soviet Union	11.50	Q
4	Paraskevi Patoulidou	Greece	11.68	Q
5	Paula Thomas	Great Britain	11.71	q
6	Sabine Richter	West Germany	11.84	
7	Joanna Smolarek	Poland	11.97	
			Wind: -1.0 m/s	

==== Heat 3 ====
Rank	Name	Nationality	Time	Notes
1	Silke Möller	East Germany	11.46	Q
2	Sisko Hanhijoki	Finland	11.51	Q
3	Irina Sergeyeva	Soviet Union	11.51	Q
4	Odiah Sidibé	France	11.58	Q
5	Stephanie Douglas	Great Britain	11.63	q
6	Lucrécia Jardim	Portugal	11.73	
			Wind: +0.1 m/s	

=== Semi-finals ===
28 August

==== Semi-final 1 ====
Rank	Name	Nationality	Time	Notes
1	Katrin Krabbe	East Germany	11.11	Q
2	Kerstin Behrendt	East Germany	11.40	Q
3	Nadezhda Roshchupkina	Soviet Union	11.44	Q
4	Ulrike Sarvari	West Germany	11.48	Q
5	Paula Thomas	Great Britain	11.57	
6	Bev Kinch	Great Britain	11.59	
7	Cristina Castro	Spain	11.61	
8	Magali Simioneck	France	11.62	
			Wind: 0.0 m/s	

==== Semi-final 2 ====
Rank	Name	Nationality	Time	Notes
1	Silke Möller	East Germany	11.39	Q
2	Odiah Sidibé	France	11.50	Q
3	Irina Sergeyeva	Soviet Union	11.54	Q
4	Stephanie Douglas	Great Britain	11.54	Q
5	Sisko Hanhijoki	Finland	11.54	
6	Paraskevi Patoulidou	Greece	11.62	
7	Natalya Kovtun	Soviet Union	11.69	
	Laurence Bily	France	DNF	
			Wind: +0.3 m/s	

=== Final ===
28 August

Rank	Name	Nationality	Time	Notes
1st place, gold medalist(s)	Katrin Krabbe	East Germany	10.89	
2nd place, silver medalist(s)	Silke Möller	East Germany	11.10	
3rd place, bronze medalist(s)	Kerstin Behrendt	East Germany	11.17	
4	Nadezhda Roshchupkina	Soviet Union	11.26	
5	Odiah Sidibé	France	11.40	
6	Irina Sergeyeva	Soviet Union	11.40	
7	Ulrike Sarvari	West Germany	11.41	
8	Stephanie Douglas	Great Britain	11.46	
			Wind: +1.8 m/s	

== See also ==
- 1988 Women's Olympic 100 metres (Seoul)
- 1991 Women's World Championships 100 metres (Tokyo)
- 1992 Women's Olympic 100 metres (Barcelona)
