= Athletics at the 1992 Summer Olympics – Women's 4 × 100 metres relay =

Official Video Highlights @ 10:08

These are the official results of the women's 4 × 100 metres relay event at the 1992 Summer Olympics in Barcelona, Spain. There were a total of fourteen nations competing.

== Medalists ==
Gold	Silver	Bronze
United States; Evelyn Ashford; Esther Jones; Carlette Guidry; Gwen Torrence; Michelle Finn*	Unified Team; Olga Bogoslovskaya; Galina Malchugina; Marina Trandenkova; Irina Privalova	Nigeria; Beatrice Utondu; Faith Idehen; Christy Opara-Thompson; Mary Onyali

* Athletes who participated in the heats only and received medals.

== Records ==
These were the standing world and Olympic records (in seconds) prior to the 1992 Summer Olympics.

World record	41.37	(East Germany) Silke Gladisch (East Germany) Sabine Rieger (East Germany) Ingrid Auerswald (East Germany) Marlies Göhr	Canberra (AUS)	October 6, 1985
Olympic record	41.60	(East Germany) Romy Müller (East Germany) Bärbel Wöckel (East Germany) Ingrid Auerswald (East Germany) Marlies Göhr	Moscow (URS)	August 1, 1980

== Results ==
=== Final ===
RANK	NATION	ATHLETES	TIME
	United States	• Evelyn Ashford • Esther Jones • Carlette Guidry • Gwen Torrence	42.11
	Unified Team	• Olga Bogoslovskaya • Galina Malchugina • Marina Trandenkova • Irina Privalova	42.16
	Nigeria	• Beatrice Utondu • Faith Idehen • Christy Opara-Thompson • Mary Onyali	42.81
4.	France	• Patricia Girard-Léno • Odiah Sidibé • Laurence Bily • Marie-José Pérec	42.85
5.	Germany	• Andrea Philipp • Silke Knoll • Andrea Thomas • Sabine Günther	43.12
6.	Australia	• Melissa Moore • Melinda Gainsford • Kathy Sambell • Kerry Johnson	43.77
—	Jamaica	• Michelle Freeman • Juliet Cuthbert • Dahlia Duhaney • Merlene Ottey	DNF
—	Cuba	• Eusebia Riquelme • Aliuska López • Idalmis Bonne • Liliana Allen	DNF

=== Heats ===
Qualification: First 3 of each heat (Q) plus the 2 fastest times (q) advance to the final.

Rank	Heat	Nation	Athletes	Time	Notes
1	2	Jamaica	Michelle Freeman, Juliet Cuthbert, Dahlia Duhaney, Merlene Ottey	42.28	Q
2	2	Nigeria	Beatrice Utondu, Faith Idehen, Christy Opara-Thompson, Mary Onyali	42.39	Q
3	1	Unified Team	Olga Bogoslovskaya, Galina Malchugina, Marina Trandenkova, Irina Privalova	42.42	Q
4	1	United States	Evelyn Ashford, Esther Jones, Carlette Guidry, Michelle Finn	42.50	Q
5	2	France	Patricia Girard, Odiah Sidibé, Laurence Bily, Marie-José Pérec	42.58	Q
6	1	Germany	Andrea Philipp, Silke-Beate Knoll, Andrea Thomas, Sabine Günther	43.32	Q
7	1	Australia	Melissa Moore, Melinda Gainsford, Kathy Sambell, Kerry Johnson	43.49	q
8	2	Cuba	Eusebia Riquelme, Aliuska López, Idalmis Bonne, Liliana Allen	43.51	q
9	2	Finland	Minna Painilainen-Soon, Sisko Hanhijoki, Sanna Hernesniemi, Marja Tennivaara	43.60	
10	1	China	Gao Han, Tian Yumei, Chen Zhaojing, Xiao Yehua	43.70	
11	2	Netherlands	Karen van der Kooij, Jacqueline Poelman, Karin de Lange, Petra Huybrechtse	43.91	
12	1	Thailand	Nednapa Chommuak, Reawadee Srithoa, Ratjai Sripet, Pornpim Srisurat	44.94	
13	1	Cameroon	Léone Mani, Georgette N'Koma, Monique Kengné, Louisette Thobi	44.97	
	2	Ivory Coast	Louise Ayétotché, Alimata Koné, Olga Mutanda, Patricia Foufoué Ziga	DQ	

== See also ==
- 1990 Women's European Championships 4 × 100 m Relay (Split)
- 1991 Women's World Championships 4 × 100 m Relay (Tokyo)
- 1993 Women's World Championships 4 × 100 m Relay (Stuttgart)
- 1994 Women's European Championships 4 × 100 m Relay (Helsinki)
