= 1995 World Championships in Athletics – Women's 4 × 100 metres relay =

These are the results of the women's 4 × 100 metres relay event at the 1995 World Championships in Athletics in Gothenburg, Sweden.

== Medalists ==
Gold	Silver	Bronze
United States; Celena Mondie-Milner; Carlette Guidry-White; Chryste Gaines; Gwen Torrence; D'Andre Hill*	Jamaica; Dahlia Duhaney; Juliet Cuthbert; Beverly McDonald; Merlene Ottey; Michelle Freeman*	Germany; Melanie Paschke; Silke Lichtenhagen; Silke-Beate Knoll; Gabriele Becker

* Runners who participated in the heats only and received medals.

== Results ==
=== Heats ===
Qualification: First 3 of each heat (Q) and the next 2 fastest (q) qualified for the final.

Rank	Heat	Nation	Athletes	Time	Notes
1.	2	Jamaica	Michelle Freeman, Dahlia Duhaney, Beverly McDonald, Merlene Ottey	42.36	Q
2.	1	United States	Celena Mondie-Milner, Carlette Guidry-White, Chryste Gaines, D'Andre Hill	42.44	Q
3.	2	Russia	Natalya Pomoshchnikova-Voronova, Galina Malchugina, Marina Trandenkova, Yekaterina Leshchova	42.49	Q
4.	1	France	Odile Singa, Frédérique Bangué, Patricia Girard, Delphine Combe	42.56	Q, NR
5.	1	Bahamas	Eldece Clarke-Lewis, Debbie Ferguson, Sevatheda Fynes, Pauline Davis-Thompson	42.74	Q, NR
6.	2	Germany	Melanie Paschke, Silke Lichtenhagen, Silke-Beate Knoll, Gabriele Becker	42.83	Q
7.	2	Colombia	Elia Mera, Felipa Palacios, Patricia Rodríguez, Mirtha Brock	43.42	q, NR
8.	1	Finland	Jutta Kemila, Sanna Hernesniemi-Kyllönen, Heide Suomi, Heli Koivula	43.71	q
9.	2	Great Britain	Marcia Richardson, Catherine Murphy, Simmone Jacobs, Paula Thomas	43.90	
10.	1	Chinese Taipei	Hsu Pei-Chin, Liu Shu-Hua, Chen Shu-Chen, Wang Huei-Chen	45.18	
—N/a	1	Cuba	Idalia Hechavarria, Aliuska López, Virgen Benavides, Liliana Allen	DQ	
—N/a	1	Cameroon	Myriam Mani, Georgette Nkoma, Agnes Egbe Ndeh, Sylvie Mballa Eloundou	DQ	
—N/a	2	Italy	Carla Tuzzi, Rossella Farina, Laura Ardissone, Manuela Levorato	DNF	

=== Final ===
Rank	Lane	Nation	Athletes	Time	Notes
1st place, gold medalist(s)	5	United States	Celena Mondie-Milner, Carlette Guidry-White, Chryste Gaines, Gwen Torrence	42.12	
2nd place, silver medalist(s)	6	Jamaica	Dahlia Duhaney, Juliet Cuthbert, Beverly McDonald, Merlene Ottey	42.25	
3rd place, bronze medalist(s)	7	Germany	Melanie Paschke, Silke Lichtenhagen, Silke-Beate Knoll, Gabriele Becker	43.01	
4	2	Bahamas	Eldece Clarke-Lewis, Debbie Ferguson, Sevatheda Fynes, Pauline Davis-Thompson	43.14	
5	3	France	Odile Singa, Frédérique Bangué, Patricia Girard, Delphine Combe	43.35	
6	1	Finland	Jutta Kemila, Sanna Hernesniemi-Kyllonen, Heidi Suomi, Heli Koivula	44.46	
7	8	Colombia	Elia Mera, Felipa Palacios, Patricia Rodríguez, Mirtha Brock	44.61	
—N/a	4	Russia	Natalya Pomoshchnikova-Voronova, Galina Malchugina, Marina Trandenkova, Yekaterina Leshchova	DNF	
