= 1995 World Championships in Athletics – Women's 100 metres =

These are the official results of the Women's 100 metres event at the 1995 IAAF World Championships in Gothenburg, Sweden. There were a total number of 58 participating athletes, with two semi-finals, four quarter-finals and eight qualifying heats and the final held on Monday 7 August 1995. The winner, Gwen Torrence of the United States, made history as the first mother to win 100 metre gold at the World Championships.

== Final ==
RANK	FINAL Wind: +0.9	TIME
	Gwen Torrence (USA)	10.85
	Merlene Ottey (JAM)	10.94
	Irina Privalova (RUS)	10.96
4.	Carlette Guidry-White (USA)	11.07
5.	Zhanna Tarnopolskaya-Pintusevich (UKR)	11.07
6.	Melanie Paschke (GER)	11.10
7.	Mary Onyali (NGR)	11.15
8.	Juliet Cuthbert (JAM)	11.44

== Semi-finals ==
- Held on Monday 1995-08-07

RANK	HEAT 1 Wind: +1.4	TIME
1.	Gwen Torrence (USA)	10.84
2.	Merlene Ottey (JAM)	10.85
3.	Irina Privalova (RUS)	10.90
4.	Zhanna Tarnopolskaya-Pintusevich (UKR)	11.09
5.	Ekaterini Thanou (GRE)	11.09
6.	Liliana Allen (CUB)	11.24
7.	Christy Opara-Thompson (NGR)	11.37
8.	Sanna Hernesniemi-Kyllönen (FIN)	11.51

RANK	HEAT 2 Wind: -0.7	TIME
1.	Carlette Guidry-White (USA)	11.09
2.	Melanie Paschke (GER)	11.13
3.	Juliet Cuthbert (JAM)	11.13
4.	Mary Onyali (NGR)	11.19
5.	Celena Mondie-Milner (USA)	11.24
6.	Melinda Gainsford-Taylor (AUS)	11.29
7.	Beverly McDonald (JAM)	11.31
8.	Yekaterina Leshchova (RUS)	11.34

== Quarterfinals ==
- Held on Sunday 1995-08-06

RANK	HEAT 1 Wind: +0.4	TIME
1.	Celena Mondie-Milner (USA)	11.26
2.	Melanie Paschke (GER)	11.27
3.	Yekaterina Leshchova (RUS)	11.33
4.	Melinda Gainsford-Taylor (AUS)	11.35
5.	Hermin Joseph (DMA)	11.44
6.	Virgen Benavides (CUB)	11.49
7.	Mary Tombiri (NGR)	11.52
8.	Petya Pendareva (BUL)	11.55

RANK	HEAT 2 Wind: +1.2	TIME
1.	Gwen Torrence (USA)	11.10
2.	Zhanna Tarnopolskaya-Pintusevich (UKR)	11.13
3.	Mary Onyali (NGR)	11.22
4.	Beverly McDonald (JAM)	11.22
5.	Natalya Voronova (RUS)	11.35
6.	Zlatka Georgieva (BUL)	11.37
7.	Gabriele Becker (GER)	11.54
8.	Delphine Combe (FRA)	11.68

RANK	HEAT 3 Wind: +0.7	TIME
1.	Irina Privalova (RUS)	11.16
2.	Merlene Ottey (JAM)	11.17
3.	Ekaterini Thanou (GRE)	11.28
4.	Christy Opara-Thompson (NGR)	11.41
5.	Eldece Clarke-Lewis (BAH)	11.49
6.	Heather Samuel (ATG)	11.51
7.	Susanthika Jayasinghe (SRI)	11.76
8.	Mirtha Brock (COL)	11.99

RANK	HEAT 4 Wind: +0.8	TIME
1.	Carlette Guidry-White (USA)	11.03
2.	Juliet Cuthbert (JAM)	11.09
3.	Liliana Allen (CUB)	11.25
4.	Sanna Hernesniemi-Kyllönen (FIN)	11.31
5.	Paula Thomas (GBR)	11.33
6.	Sevatheda Fynes (BAH)	11.36
7.	Hanitriniaina Rakotondrabe (MAD)	11.46
8.	Frédérique Bangué (FRA)	11.55

== Qualifying heats ==
- Held on Sunday 1995-08-06

RANK	HEAT 1 Wind: +0.5	TIME
1.	Yekaterina Leshchova (RUS)	11.27
2.	Mary Onyali (NGR)	11.44
3.	Hanitriniaina Rakotondrabe (MAD)	11.51
4.	Virgen Benavides (CUB)	11.52
5.	Andrea Philipp (GER)	11.66
6.	Stephanie Douglas (GBR)	11.67
7.	Magdalena Ansue Nguema (GEQ)	13.62

RANK	HEAT 2 Wind: -0.4	TIME
1.	Merlene Ottey (JAM)	11.15
2.	Natalya Voronova (RUS)	11.23
3.	Mary Tombiri (NGR)	11.42
4.	Petya Pendareva (BUL)	11.45
5.	Gabriele Becker (GER)	11.54
6.	Rahela Markt (CRO)	11.87
7.	Sortelina Da Silva (STP)	13.16

RANK	HEAT 3 Wind: +0.3	TIME
1.	Zhanna Tarnopolskaya-Pintusevich (UKR)	11.34
2.	Liliana Allen (CUB)	11.35
3.	Hermin Joseph (DMA)	11.52
4.	Susanthika Jayasinghe (SRI)	11.55
5.	Simone Jacobs (GBR)	11.60
6.	Jerneja Perc (SLO)	11.86
7.	Brianie Massaka (CGO)	12.67

RANK	HEAT 4 Wind: +0.4	TIME
1.	Juliet Cuthbert (JAM)	11.26
2.	Heather Samuel (ATG)	11.42
3.	Sanna Hernesniemi-Kyllönen (FIN)	11.47
4.	Sevatheda Fynes (BAH)	11.52
5.	Felipa Palacios (COL)	11.63
6.	Damayanthi Dharsha-Kobalavithanage (SRI)	11.65
7.	Kate Clarke (LBR)	13.45
8.	Awa Diarra (MTN)	13.86

RANK	HEAT 5 Wind: +0.5	TIME
1.	Gwen Torrence (USA)	11.11
2.	Ekaterini Thanou (GRE)	11.27
3.	Christy Opara-Thompson (NGR)	11.31
4.	Zlatka Georgieva (BUL)	11.36
5.	Chandra Sturrup (BAH)	11.59
6.	Georgette Nkoma (CMR)	11.80
7.	Shabana Akhtar (PAK)	12.40

RANK	HEAT 6 Wind: +0.3	TIME
1.	Carlette Guidry-White (USA)	11.18
2.	Melinda Gainsford-Taylor (AUS)	11.32
3.	Mirtha Brock (COL)	11.56
4.	Nora Ivanova (BUL)	11.57
5.	Katia Regina de Jesus Santos (BRA)	11.68
6.	Odile Singa (FRA)	11.70
7.	Thi Lan Ank Hoang (VIE)	12.42
—	Desiree Cooks (AIA)	DNS

RANK	HEAT 7 Wind: -.03	TIME
1.	Melanie Paschke (GER)	11.15
2.	Paula Thomas (GBR)	11.34
3.	Delphine Combe (FRA)	11.39
4.	Eldece Clarke-Lewis (BAH)	11.40
5.	Wang Huei-Chen (TPE)	11.84
6.	Thoumphone Phommasanh (LAO)	13.86
—	Natalie Jones (GRN)	DNS

RANK	HEAT 8 Wind: +0.4	TIME
1.	Irina Privalova (RUS)	11.28
2.	Celena Mondie-Milner (USA)	11.40
3.	Beverly McDonald (JAM)	11.52
4.	Frédérique Bangué (FRA)	11.54
5.	Cleide Amaral (BRA)	11.57
6.	Judith Boshoff (NAM)	12.14
—	Antonia De Jesus (ANG)	DNS
