= Athletics at the 1994 Commonwealth Games – Women's 100 metres =

Women's 100 metres at the Commonwealth Games

The women's 100 metres event at the 1994 Commonwealth Games was held on 22 and 23 August at the Centennial Stadium in Victoria, British Columbia.

== Medalists ==
Gold	Silver	Bronze
Mary Onyali; Nigeria	Christy Opara-Thompson; Nigeria	Paula Thomas; England

== Results ==
=== Heats ===
Wind:
Heat 1: +1.3 m/s, Heat 2: +0.9 m/s, Heat 3: +0.5 m/s, Heat 4: +0.2 m/s

Rank	Heat	Name	Nationality	Time	Notes
1	1	Mary Onyali	Nigeria	11.24	Q
2	3	Mary Tombiri	Nigeria	11.26	Q
3	4	Melinda Gainsford	Australia	11.29	Q
4	4	Paula Thomas	England	11.30	Q
5	2	Christy Opara-Thompson	Nigeria	11.38	Q
6	2	Dahlia Duhaney	Jamaica	11.40	Q
7	1	Hermin Joseph	Dominica	11.45	Q
8	1	Philomena Mensah	Ghana	11.46	Q
9	3	Stephi Douglas	England	11.49	Q
10	3	Michelle Seymour	New Zealand	11.51	Q
11	4	Heather Samuel	Antigua and Barbuda	11.55	Q
12	3	Doris Manu	Ghana	11.56	q
13	3	Danaa Myhill	Isle of Man	11.60	q
14	1	Karen Clarke	Canada	11.65	q
14	2	Simmone Jacobs	England	11.65	Q
16	2	Eldece Clarke	Bahamas	11.66	q
17	4	Govindasamy Shanti	Malaysia	11.67	
18	2	Monique Miers	Australia	11.73	
19	4	Simone Tomlinson	Canada	11.74	
20	1	Judith Boshoff	Namibia	11.79	
21	4	Martha Adusei	Ghana	11.85	
22	2	Dionne Wright	Canada	11.88	
23	2	Bernice Morton	Saint Kitts and Nevis	12.11	
24	4	Mirenda Francourt	Seychelles	12.34	
25	1	Clara Phillip	Saint Lucia	12.35	
26	3	Ana Liku	Tonga	12.37	
	1	Damayanthi Darsha	Sri Lanka	DNS	
	3	Susanthika Jayasinghe	Sri Lanka	DNS	

=== Semifinals ===
Wind:
Heat 1: +1.2 m/s, Heat 2: +1.5 m/s

Rank	Heat	Name	Nationality	Time	Notes
1	2	Mary Onyali	Nigeria	11.03	Q
2	2	Paula Thomas	England	11.15	Q
3	2	Christy Opara-Thompson	Nigeria	11.19	Q
4	1	Mary Tombiri	Nigeria	11.25	Q
5	1	Melinda Gainsford	Australia	11.28	Q
6	2	Hermin Joseph	Dominica	11.29	Q
7	1	Stephi Douglas	England	11.34	Q
8	1	Dahlia Duhaney	Jamaica	11.35	Q
9	2	Philomena Mensah	Ghana	11.45	
10	2	Simmone Jacobs	England	11.47	
11	2	Eldece Clarke	Bahamas	11.54	
12	1	Heather Samuel	Antigua and Barbuda	11.56	
13	1	Michelle Seymour	New Zealand	11.59	
14	2	Danaa Myhill	Isle of Man	11.63	
15	1	Karen Clarke	Canada	11.69	
16	1	Doris Manu	Ghana	11.79	

=== Final ===
Wind: -0.2 m/s

Rank	Lane	Name	Nationality	Time	Notes
1st place, gold medalist(s)	5	Mary Onyali	Nigeria	11.06	
2nd place, silver medalist(s)	3	Christy Opara-Thompson	Nigeria	11.22	
3rd place, bronze medalist(s)	4	Paula Thomas	England	11.23	
4	7	Melinda Gainsford	Australia	11.31	
5	1	Dahlia Duhaney	Jamaica	11.34	
6	2	Hermin Joseph	Dominica	11.36	
7	6	Mary Tombiri	Nigeria	11.37	
8	8	Stephi Douglas	England	11.48	
