= Beverly Kinch =

British sprinter and long jumper (born 1964)

Bev Kinch
Personal information
- Nationality: British (English)
- Born: 14 January 1964 (age 62) Ipswich, England
- Height: 162 cm (5 ft 4 in)
- Weight: 58 kg (128 lb)

Sport
- Sport: Athletics
- Event: Sprints
- Club: Borough of Hounslow AC
Medal record
Women's athletics
Representing Great Britain
European Championships
Bronze medal – third place	1990 Split	4×100 m
European Indoor Championships
Gold medal – first place	1984 Gothenburg	60 m
Universiade
Gold medal – first place	1983 Edmonton	100 m
Representing England
Commonwealth Games
Bronze medal – third place	1982 Brisbane	Long jump

Beverly "Bev" Kinch (born 14 January 1964) is an English former long jumper and sprinter. She held the UK long jump record for 29 years (1983–2012) with 6.90 metres. She is the 1983 Universiade Champion at 100 metres and the 1984 European Indoor Champion at 60 metres. She also represented Great Britain at the 1988 Olympic Games in Seoul.

== Biography ==
Kinch was born in Ipswich, Suffolk, England and was a member of the Borough of Hounslow AC. She competed at the 1982 Commonwealth Games in Brisbane, winning the bronze medal in the long jump with a jump of 6.78 m.

In 1983, aged 19, she came fifth in the long jump final at the World Championships in Helsinki with a wind-assisted 6.93 metres. In the same competition, she set a British record of 6.90 metres, which stood until 2012. In 1983 she also won the gold in the 100 metres at the Universiade in a time of 11.13 (wind-assisted). The US magazine Track & Field News ranked her the seventh best long jumper in the world in 1983.

In 1984, Kinch competed in the European Indoor Championships in Gothenburg, where she won a gold medal in the 60 m sprint in a time of 7.16 seconds. Kinch was an outstanding talent, who seemed to have a successful future ahead of her, She earned selection for the 1984 Olympics at both 100 metres and long jump but was forced to withdraw because of injury and was never able to regain her former glory.

At the 1986 European Indoor Championships in Madrid she finished fourth in a time of 7.13 seconds in the 60 m sprint, a British record that stood until Jeanette Kwakye ran 7.08 seconds at the World Indoor Championships in Valencia in 2008. Kinch finished third behind Paula Dunn in the 100 metres event at the 1988 AAA Championships.

Kinch competed at the 1988 Olympic Games in Seoul as a member of the UK 4 × 100 metres relay quartet that reached the semi-finals. In 1990, she won a European Championship bronze medal in the relay along with her teammates Stephanie Douglas, Simmone Jacobs and Paula Thomas. That year also saw her run a lifetime best in the 100 m with 11.29 secs. Kinch was third again at the 1990 AAA Championships, this time behind Stephi Douglas.

She reached the quarter-finals of the 100 metres at the World Championships in both Tokyo, 1991 and Stuttgart, 1993. Kinch finally became the British 100 metres champion after winning the British WAAA Championships title at the 1993 AAA Championships.

In 1996, Kinch earned relay selection for the Olympic Games, was forced to withdraw due to injury.

== Achievements ==
Year	Competition	Venue	Position	Event	Notes
Representing England
1982	1982 Commonwealth Games	Brisbane, Australia	3rd	Long Jump	6.78 m
Representing Great Britain
1983	European Indoor Championships	Budapest, Hungary	4th	60 metres	7.19
1983	Universiade (World Student Games)	Edmonton, Canada	1st	100 metres	11.13 w
1983	World Championships	Helsinki, Finland	5th	Long Jump	6.93 m w
1984	European Indoor Championships	Göteborg, Sweden	1st	60 metres	7.16
1986	European Indoor Championships	Madrid, Spain	4th	60 metres	7.16
1988	Olympic Games	Seoul, South Korea	semi-final	4 × 100 metres	43.50
1990	European Championships	Split, Yugoslavia	semi-final	100 metres	11.59
1990	European Championships	Split, Yugoslavia	3rd	4 × 100 metres	43.32
1991	World Championships	Tokyo, Japan	quarter-final	100 metres	11.45
1991	World Championships	Tokyo, Japan	heats	4 × 100 metres	43.43
1993	World Championships in Athletics	Stuttgart, Germany	quarter-final	100 metres	11.40
1993	World Championships in Athletics	Stuttgart, Germany	8th	4 × 100 metres	43.86
