= 1990 European Athletics Championships – Women's 4 × 100 metres relay =

Women's 4 × 100 metres relay at the European Athletics Championships

These are the official results of the Women's 4 × 100 metres event at the 1990 European Championships in Split, Yugoslavia, held at Stadion Poljud on 1 September 1990.

== Medalists ==
Gold	Silke Möller; Katrin Krabbe; Kerstin Behrendt; Sabine Günther; East Germany
Silver	Gabriele Lippe; Ulrike Sarvari; Andrea Thomas; Silke Knoll; West Germany
Bronze	Stephanie Douglas; Bev Kinch; Simmone Jacobs; Paula Thomas; United Kingdom

== Results ==
=== Final ===
1 September

Rank	Nation	Competitors	Time	Notes
1st place, gold medalist(s)	East Germany	Silke Möller; Katrin Krabbe; Kerstin Behrendt; Sabine Günther	41.68	
2nd place, silver medalist(s)	West Germany	Gabriele Lippe; Ulrike Sarvari; Andrea Thomas; Silke Knoll	43.02	
3rd place, bronze medalist(s)	United Kingdom	Stephanie Douglas; Bev Kinch; Simmone Jacobs; Paula Thomas	43.32	
4	France	Cécile Peyre; Magali Simioneck; Odile Singa; Odiah Sidibé	43.43	
5	Italy	Annarita Balzani; Maria Ruggeri; Daniela Ferrian; Rossella Tarolo	43.71	
6	Spain	Yolanda Díaz; Cristina Castro; María del Carmen García; Sandra Myers	44.86	
	Soviet Union	Yelena Bykova; Galina Malchugina; Natalya Kovtun; Nadezhda Roshchupkina	DNF	
	Finland	Sari Raumala; Sisko Hanhijoki; Sanna Hernesniemi; Marja Salmela	DQ	

== Participation ==
According to an unofficial count, 32 athletes from 8 countries participated in the event.

- East Germany (4)
- Finland (4)
- France (4)
- Italy (4)
- Soviet Union (4)
- Spain (4)
- United Kingdom (4)
- West Germany (4)

== See also ==
- 1991 Women's World Championships 4 × 100 m Relay (Tokyo)
- 1992 Women's Olympic 4 × 100 m Relay (Barcelona)
- 1993 Women's World Championships 4 × 100 m Relay (Stuttgart)
