= Joan Josep Guillén i Zambrano =

Joan Josep Guillén i Zambrano (born Fuente del Maestre, Extremadura, Spain 1947) is a draftsman, painter, scenographer, and professor of performing arts.

== Biography and career path ==
Guillén i Zambrano's parents emigrated to Manlleu when he was one year old, and he spent his childhood and adolescence there. He started with amateur theater, which was a kind of escape for him. He became known in 1970 by publishing drawings in the Catalan press, while he began studying theatrical direction and set design at the Theatre Institute of Barcelona. He enjoyed an intense and productive professional career there and, at the same time, was a professor of performing arts between 1973 and 2003.

Guillén i Zambrano has collaborated with several theater groups in the construction of masks for street shows, as with the Viva Picasso show in 1981. He also collaborated with the theater group Els Comediants for more than twenty years, and created sets for shows like El Llibre de les Bèsties and La Cenerentola, the latter of which premiered in 2011 in Canada and was performed in 2015 by the Lyric Opera of Chicago. In the field of Catalan stage design, he began working in the 1960s and became one of the more famous set designers, with contemporary authors such as Fabià Puigserver i Plana, Ramon B. Ivars Amigo, Andreu Rabal Serrat and Josep Messeguer Vendrell.

In the field of graphic illustration, Guillén i Zambrano has been published in a wide variety of magazines and newspapers such as Triunfo, La Calle, Tele-Exprés, El Món, La Vanguardia, Avui, El Periódico de Catalunya and Muchas Gracias. In Catalonia, he has been a pioneer in the field of digital design. Between 1985 and 1987, he created material for TV3, and later TVE. He has also been featured in several exhibitions, such as Spanish Transition, organized by the National Library of Spain, as well as the Suite Nonell in 2013.

In 2016, Guillén was one of the signers of a statement entitled "In favor of greater social involvement in the promotion of arts and culture: commitment to cultural patronage", promoted by the Ateneu Barcelonés and the CoNCA (National Council of Arts and Culture). In 2013 he accepted the proposal of the National Library of Spain to give them his file.

In 2017, Guillén donated part of his collection, which contains original sets and costumes for shows such as The Magic Flute, El llibre de les bèsties, and La Cenerentola, to the Biblioteca de Catalunya; he also contributed satirical drawings for the press (Tele-Expres, Muchas gracias, Diario de Barcelona...), posters, photographs, and handbills of different works.

== Awards and acknowledgements ==
- Premi Ciutat de Barcelona (1983 and 1985) in the communication media category.
- Gold Medal of Clothing at the "9a Quadriennal de Arquitectura y Escenografía" of Praga (1999)
- National Culture Award of CoNCA (2016).

== Publications ==
- 1971: El viatge prodigiós de Ferran Pinyol. Europa. (with the collaboration of "Els Comediants").
- 1976: Any I del post-franquisme (in collaboration). Barcelona: Ketres.
- 1984: El carnaval (storybook).
- 1984: El globus (storybook).
- 1996: Caixa de Manlleu: 100 anys d'història, 1896-1996 (in collaboration).
- 1998: Artefactes parateatrals. Tradició/innovació.
- 2002: El libro del día y de la noche: treinta años de sombras y despertares (as an illustrator, with the collaboration of "Els Comediants").
