= Athletics at the 1990 Commonwealth Games – Women's 4 × 100 metres relay =

Women's relay

Women's 4 × 100 metres relay at the Commonwealth Games

The women's 4 × 100 metres relay event at the 1990 Commonwealth Games was held on 3 February at the Mount Smart Stadium in Auckland.

== Results ==
Rank	Lane	Nation	Athletes	Time	Notes
1st place, gold medalist(s)	2	Australia	Monique Dunstan, Kathy Sambell, Cathy Freeman, Kerry Johnson	43.87	
2nd place, silver medalist(s)	4	England	Stephi Douglas, Jenni Stoute, Simmone Jacobs, Paula Dunn	44.15	FS1
3rd place, bronze medalist(s)	6	Nigeria	Beatrice Utondu, Fatima Yusuf, Charity Opara, Chioma Ajunwa	44.67	
4	5	New Zealand	Helen Pirovano, Michelle Seymour, Jayne Moffitt, Bev Peterson	44.77	
	1	Canada	Stacey Bowen, France Gareau, Nadine Halliday, Katie Anderson	DQ	
	3	Wales		DNS	
