= Onyinye Chikezie =

Nigerian sprinter

Onyinye Chikezie (born 23 March 1973) is a retired Nigerian female sprinter who specialised in 100 metres. She won a gold medal in the 1990 African Championships in Cairo. Her personal best in 100 metres was 11.56. She also competed in the 1992 World Junior Championships in Athletics in Seoul in 100 metres, 200 metres and was part of Nigeria's 4×100 metres relay women's team, without progressing to the finals in any of these events.

== International competitions ==
Year	Competition	Venue	Position	Event	Notes
Representing Nigeria
1990	African Championships	Cairo, Egypt	1st	100 m	11.56
1992	World Junior Championships in Athletics	Seoul, South Korea	14th (q)	100 m	11.92
1992	World Junior Championships in Athletics	Seoul, South Korea	15th (q)	200 m	24.58
1992	World Junior Championships in Athletics	Seoul, South Korea	12th (q)	4 × 100 m relay	46.58
1993	Summer Universiade	Buffalo, United States	3rd	4 × 400 m relay	3:34.97
