= Athletics at the 1994 Commonwealth Games – Women's 4 × 100 metres relay =

Women's 4 × 100 metres relay at the Commonwealth Games

The women's 4 × 100 metres relay event at the 1994 Commonwealth Games was held on 28 August at the Centennial Stadium in Victoria, British Columbia.

== Results ==
Rank	Lane	Nation	Athletes	Time	Notes
1st place, gold medalist(s)	6	Nigeria	Faith Idehen, Mary Tombiri, Christy Opara-Thompson, Mary Onyali	42.99	GR
2nd place, silver medalist(s)	5	Australia	Monique Miers, Cathy Freeman, Melinda Gainsford, Kathy Sambell	43.43	
3rd place, bronze medalist(s)	4	England	Stephi Douglas, Geraldine McLeod, Simmone Jacobs, Paula Thomas	43.46	
4	7	Jamaica	Michelle Freeman, Merlene Frazer, Dionne Rose, Dahlia Duhaney	43.51	
5	3	Bahamas	Eldece Clarke, Dedra Davis, Debbie Ferguson, Pauline Davis	44.89	
6	2	Canada	Tanja Reid, France Gareau, Karen Clarke, Simone Tomlinson	45.15	
7	8	Ghana	Doris Manu, Noami Mills, Agnes Nuamah, Mercy Addy	45.72	
