= Gabriele Becker =

German sprinter (born 1975)

Medal record

Women's athletics

Representing Germany

World Championships
| Bronze medal – third place | 1995 Gothenburg | 4 × 100 m relay |

Gabriele Becker (born 17 April 1975) is a German former track and field sprinter who competed mainly over 100 metres. She represented her country at the 1995 World Championships in Athletics and won a bronze medal in the relay.

Born in Marburg, Becker took up track and field at a young age and trained at the LAZ Bruchköbel sports club. Initially she took part in a variety of events and completed youth heptathlons, but soon focused on sprinting instead. She won the German youth title over 100 m in 1991, then took German junior doubles in the 60 metres and 100 m in both 1993 and 1994. She made her international debut at the 1992 World Junior Championships in Athletics, finishing as a 100 m semi-finalist.

Becker's first international medal came with the German 4 × 100 metres relay team, when she anchored home a quartet including Sandra Roos, Birgit Brodbeck, and Carmen Bertmaring to the bronze medal at the 1993 European Athletics Junior Championships. She also finished seventh individually in the 100 m at that competition. At the 1994 World Junior Championships in Athletics, she was again a 100 m semi-finalist, but secured a silver medal with the relay team of Roos, Sandra Görigk and Esther Möller, finishing behind Jamaica.

After winning the German under-23 100 m title, she was selected to run at the 1995 World Championships in Athletics both individually and in the relay. She reached the quarter-finals of the 100 m, recording a best of 11.54 seconds in that round, but was eliminated in seventh place. A German senior women's team of Melanie Paschke, Silke Lichtenhagen, Silke-Beate Knoll, and Becker finished the relay final in a time of 43.01, with Becker anchoring the team to the finish line to secure the World Championships bronze medal behind the American and Jamaican teams.

== Personal bests ==
- 100 metres – 11.34 seconds (1995)
- 200 metres – 23.63 seconds (1995)
- 60 metres indoor – 7.41 seconds (1995)

== International competitions ==
| Year | Competition | Venue | Position | Event | Notes |
Representing Germany
| 1992 | World Junior Championships | Seoul, South Korea | 10th (semis) | 100 m | 11.83 |
| 1993 | European Junior Championships | San Sebastián, Spain | 7th | 100 m | 11.74 |
| 1993 | European Junior Championships | San Sebastián, Spain | 3rd | 4 × 100 m relay | 44.60 |
| 1994 | World Junior Championships | Lisbon, Portugal | 12th (semis) | 100 m | 11.66 (wind: +1.3 m/s) |
| 1994 | World Junior Championships | Lisbon, Portugal | 2nd | 4 × 100 m relay | 44.78 |
| 1995 | World Championships | Gothenburg, Sweden | 7th (q-finals) | 100 m | 11.54 |
| 1995 | World Championships | Gothenburg, Sweden | 3rd | 4 × 100 m relay | 43.01 |
