= Celena Mondie-Milner =

American sprinter

Personal information
- Born: August 6, 1968 (age 58) Milledgeville, Georgia, United States

Sport
- Sport: Track and field
Medal record
Representing United States
World Championships
Gold medal – first place	1995 Gothenburg	4×100 m relay
Summer Universiade
Gold medal – first place	1989 Duisburg	4x100 m relay

Celena Mondie-Milner (born August 6, 1968) is a retired American sprinter who specialized in the 100 and 200 metres.

Mondie-Milner was a multiple-time All-American for the Illinois Fighting Illini track and field team, finishing runner-up in the 100 m at the 1990 NCAA Division I Outdoor Track and Field Championships.

She competed in both 200 metres at the 1991 World Indoor Championships, and 100 and 200 metres at the 1995 World Championships, without reaching the final. Her foremost achievement was a gold medal in the 4 × 400 metres relay at the 1995 World Championships.

Her personal best times were 11.17 seconds in the 100 metres, achieved in June 1996 in Atlanta; 22.55 seconds in the 200 metres, achieved in June 1996 in Atlanta; and 51.14 seconds in the 400 metres, achieved in June 1989 in Provo.
