= Iñaki González =

Spanish footballer

Personal information
- Full name: Iñaki González Zambrano
- Date of birth: 27 July 2004 (age 22)
- Place of birth: Fuente del Maestre, Spain
- Height: 1.79 m (5 ft 10 in)
- Position: Midfielder

Team information
- Current team: Las Palmas
- Number: 26

Youth career
- Gran Maestre
- Atlético San José
- Extremadura
- 2021–2022: Badajoz
- 2022–2023: Las Palmas

Senior career*
Years	Team	Apps	(Gls)
2020–2021	Extremadura C	3	(1)
2021	Extremadura B	12	(0)
2022	Badajoz B	2	(0)
2023–2024	Las Palmas B	32	(1)
2023–	Las Palmas	12	(0)
2024–2025	→ Unionistas (loan)	30	(0)
- * Club domestic league appearances and goals as of 3 June 2026

Iñaki González Zambrano (born 27 July 2004) is a Spanish professional footballer who plays as a midfielder for UD Las Palmas.

== Career ==
Born in Fuente del Maestre, Badajoz, Extremadura, González played for local sides CP Gran Maestre and Atlético San José before joining Extremadura UD's youth sides. He made his senior debut with the C-team in the regional leagues at the age of 16, before featuring with the reserves in Tercera División.

In 2021, González moved to CD Badajoz and returned to the youth sides, but also featured rarely with the B-team in Tercera División RFEF. On 17 August 2022, he signed for UD Las Palmas and was assigned to the Juvenil squad.

Promoted to the Amarillos's B-team ahead of the 2023–24 season, González made his first team debut on 31 October 2023, coming on as a late substitute for Juanma Herzog in a 3–0 away win over CE Manacor, for the campaign's Copa del Rey. He made his professional – and La Liga – debut the following 13 January, replacing Munir El Haddadi late into a 3–0 home win over Villarreal CF.

On 31 July 2024, González moved on loan to Unionistas de Salamanca CF in Primera Federación.
