= Athletics at the 1993 Summer Universiade – Women's 4 × 400 metres relay =

The women's 4 × 400 metres relay event at the 1993 Summer Universiade was held at the UB Stadium in Buffalo, United States on 18 July 1993.

== Results ==
Rank	Nation	Athletes	Time	Notes
1st place, gold medalist(s)	United States	Crystal Irving, Maicel Malone, Youlanda Warren, Michelle Collins	3:26.18	
2nd place, silver medalist(s)	Cuba	Nancy McLeón, Yudalis Limonta, Idalmis Bonne, Oraidis Ramirez	3:28.95	
3rd place, bronze medalist(s)	Nigeria	Onyinye Chikezie, Omotayo Akinremi, Olabisi Afolabi, Omolade Akinremi	3:34.97	
4	Canada	France Gareau, Stacey Bowen, Alanna Yakiwchuk, Judy Fraser	3:36.42	
5	Portugal	Natália Moura, Cristina Regalo, Eduarda Coelho, Elsa Amaral	3:37.47	
6	Great Britain	Keri Maddox, Paula Fryer, Joanna Latimer, Claire Raven	3:38.07	
7	Puerto Rico	Sol González, Adelisa Díaz, Sandra Moya, Beatríz Rivera	3:54.85	
	Jamaica		DNS	
