= Pronpim Srisurat =

Thai sprinter

Personal information
- Nationality: Thai
- Born: 8 March 1968 (age 58)

Sport
- Sport: Sprinting
- Event: 4 × 100 metres relay
Medal record
Women's athletics
Representing Thailand
Asian Championships
Silver medal – second place	1991 Kuala Lumpur	4×100 m
Bronze medal – third place	1989 New Delhi	4×100 m

Pronpim Srisurat (born 8 March 1968) is a Thai sprinter. She competed in the women's 4 × 100 metres relay at the 1992 Summer Olympics.
