= Rossella Farina =

Italian sprinter

Personal information
- Nationality: Italian
- Born: 6 June 1974 (age 52)

Sport
- Country: Italy
- Sport: Athletics
- Event: Sprinting

Achievements and titles
- Personal best: +100 m: 11.63 (1997)

Rossella Farina (born 6 June 1974) is an Italian female retired sprinter, which participated at the 1995 World Championships in Athletics.

== Achievements ==
Year	Competition	Venue	Position	Event	Performance	Notes
1995	World Championships	(Sweden) Gothenburg	Heat	4x100 metres relay	NM	
