= Oleg Sakirkin =

Kazakh and Soviet triple jumper (1966–2015)

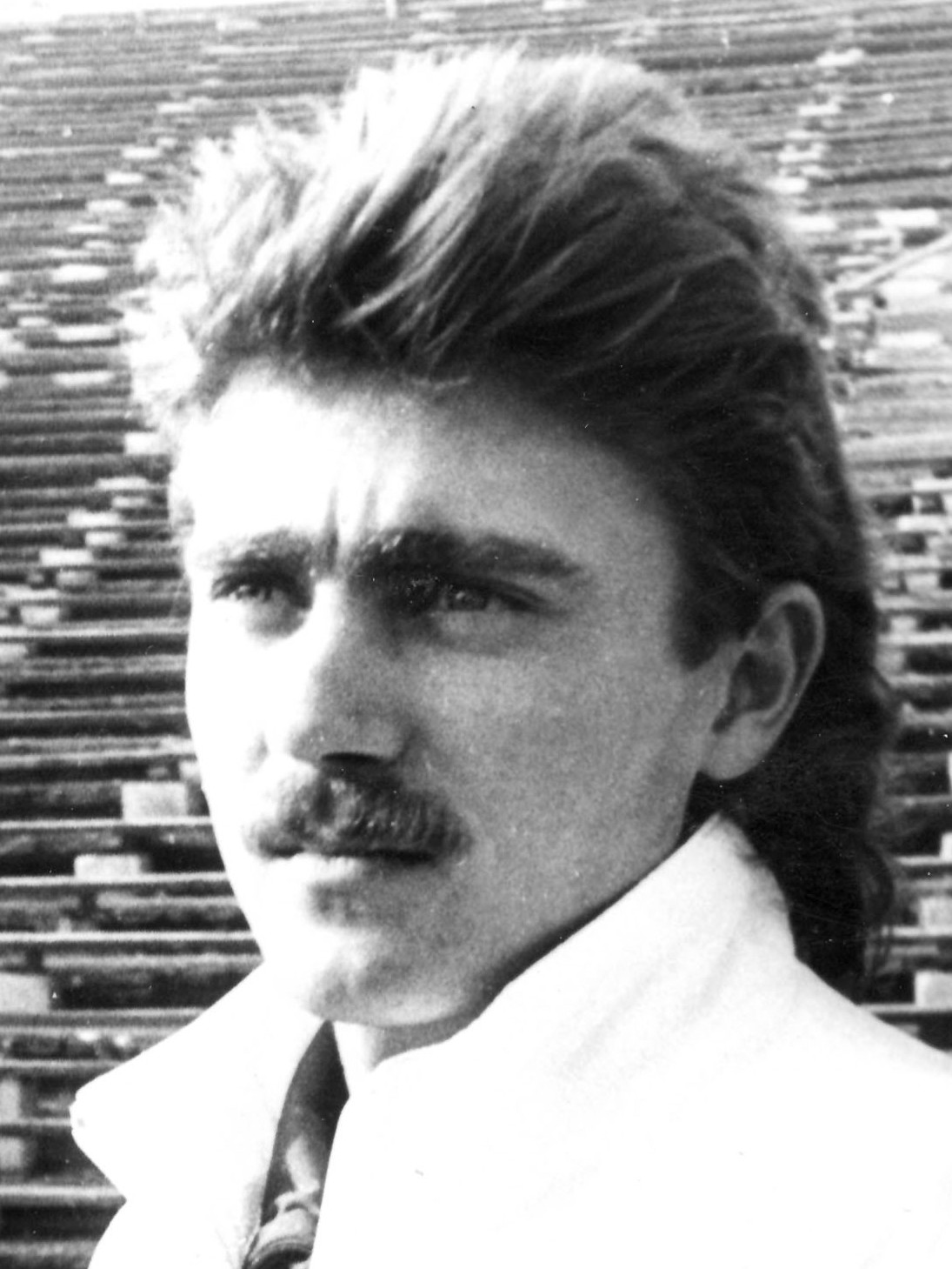
- Sakirkin in 1988

Personal information
- Full name: Oleg Evgyenevich Sakirkin
- Born: 23 January 1966 Shymkent, Kazakhstan
- Died: 18 March 2015 (aged 49) Shymkent, Kazakhstan
- Height: 182 cm (6 ft 0 in)
- Weight: 72 kg (159 lb)
Medal record
Men's athletics
Representing Soviet Union
World Championships
Bronze medal – third place	1987 Rome	Triple jump
European Indoor Championships
Gold medal – first place	1988 Budapest	Triple jump
Silver medal – second place	1990 Glasgow	Triple jump
Summer Universiade
Bronze medal – third place	1989 Duisburg	Triple jump
Representing Kazakhstan
Summer Universiade
Silver medal – second place	1993 Buffalo	Triple jump
Asian Championships
Silver medal – second place	1993 Manila	Triple jump

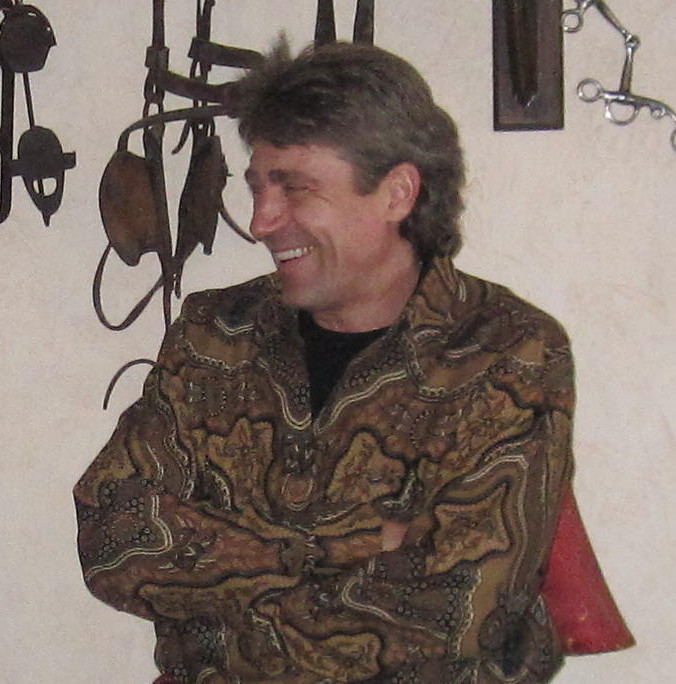
Sakirkin in 2010

Oleg Evgyenevich Sakirkin (Kazakh: Олег Евгеневич Сакиркин; 23 January 1966 – 18 March 2015) was a triple jumper from Shymkent, Ongutsik Qazaqstan, who represented the USSR and later Kazakhstan. His greatest achievement came in 1987 when he won the World Championship bronze medal with a personal best jump of 17.43 metres. He went on to win the 1988 European Indoor Championships (17.30 m) and the 1994 Asian Games (17.21 m).

Sakirkin was twice a silver medallist at the Summer Universiade (1989 and 1993) and was runner-up at the 1993 Asian Athletics Championships. He also had victories at the 1988 IAAF Grand Prix (17.50 m), the 1989 European Cup (17.17 m), the 1993 IAAF Grand Prix (17.49 m), the 1994 IAAF Grand Prix Final (17.49 m).

In 1989 he improved his personal best to 17.58 metres and set the USSR outdoor record. He held the Asian indoor record (17.09 m), set at the 1993 USSR Championships, for twenty years and was eventually beaten by Dong Bin in 2013. Sakirkin's Asian outdoor record (17.35 m, set at the Brothers Znamensky Memorial) stood from 1994 to 2009. He set 17 Kazakh national records starting from 17.02 m up to the current record of 17.58 m. He also competed at the 2000 Olympics without reaching the final.

Sakirkin died on 18 March 2015. He was 49.

== International competitions ==
Year	Competition	Venue	Position	Notes
Representing Soviet Union
1987	World Championships	Rome, Italy	3rd	
1988	European Indoor Championships	Budapest, Hungary	1st	
1989	European Cup	Budapest, Hungary	1st	
1989	Summer Universiade	Duisburg, West Germany	2nd	
1990	European Indoor Championships	Glasgow, United Kingdom	2nd	
Representing Kazakhstan
1993	Summer Universiade	Buffalo, United States	2nd	
1993	Asian Championships	Manila, Philippines	2nd	
1994	Goodwill Games	St. Petersburg, Russia	2nd	
1994	Grand Prix Final	Paris, France	1st	
1994	World Cup	London, United Kingdom	3rd	
1994	Asian Games	Hiroshima, Japan	1st	
1995	Central Asian Games	Tashkent, Uzbekistan	1st	
1999	Central Asian Games	Bishkek, Kyrgyzstan	1st	
