= Kathy Sambell =

Australian sprinter

Personal information
- Nationality: Australian
- Born: 16 January 1963 (age 63)

Sport
- Sport: Sprinting
- Event: 4 × 100 metres relay
Medal record
Women's athletics
Representing Australia
Commonwealth Games
Gold medal – first place	1990 Auckland	4 × 100 m
Silver medal – second place	1994 Victoria BC	4 × 100 m

Kathy Sambell (born 16 January 1963) is an Australian sprinter. She competed in the women's 4 × 100 metres relay at the 1992 Summer Olympics.

In 1989 Kathy won the Australian 100 yards title.

In 1990 she was Commonwealth champion in the sprint relay in Auckland, New Zealand.

1994 she won the silver medal in the same event.

Kathy also won the 1992 Scottish 100/200 championship.
