= Marja Tennivaara =

Finnish sprinter

Personal information
- Nationality: Finnish
- Born: 30 June 1967 (age 58)

Sport
- Sport: Sprinting
- Event: 4 × 100 metres relay

Marja Tennivaara (born 30 June 1967) is a Finnish sprinter. She competed in the women's 4 × 100 metres relay at the 1992 Summer Olympics.
