= Natalya Kovtun =

Natalya Kovtun (Russian: Наталья Ковтун; born 27 May 1964) is a sprint athlete who represented the Soviet Union and later Russia. She specialized in the short sprints and also ran relay races, winning the silver medal in 4 × 100 metres relay at the 1991 World Championships in Athletics.

== International competitions ==
Year	Competition	Venue	Position	Event	Notes
Representing Soviet Union
1981	European Junior Championships	Utrecht, Netherlands	6th	100 m	11.69
1981	European Junior Championships	Utrecht, Netherlands	5th	4 × 100 m	45.33
1989	World Indoor Championships	Budapest, Hungary	3rd	200 m	23.28
1989	World Cup	Barcelona, Spain	2nd	4 × 100 m	42.76
1990	European Indoor Championships	Glasgow, Scotland	2nd	200 m	23.01
1990	European Championships	Split, Yugoslavia	15th (sf)	100 m	11.69
1990	European Championships	Split, Yugoslavia	—	4 × 100 m	DNF
1991	World Championships	Tokyo, Japan	10th (sf)	100 m	11.37
1991	World Championships	Tokyo, Japan	2nd	4x100	42.20
(sf) Indicates overall position in semifinal round
