= Kooijman =

Kooijman is a Dutch language occupational surname. Kooij is an archaic spelling of kooi ("cage"), generally referring to a pen or a duck decoy, and the name often originated with a herder, duck breeder, or cage maker. The ij digraph is often replaced with a "y". Among other variant spellings are Cooijman, Kooijmans, and Kooiman. People with the surname include:

== Kooijman(s) ==
- Dick Kooijman (born 1972), Dutch football player
- Femke Kooijman (born 1978), Dutch field hockey player
- Hendrik Jan Kooijman (born 1960), Dutch field hockey player
- Jaap Kooijman (born 1994), Dutch racing cyclist
- Marjolein Kooijman (born 1980), Dutch bass player
- Pieter Adrianus Kooijman (1891–1975), Dutch anarchist
- Pieter Kooijmans (1933–2013), Dutch jurist, politician and diplomat, Minister of Foreign Affairs 1993–94

== Kooyman(s) ==
- Barbara Kooyman (born 1958), American singer-songwriter
- Frank I. Kooyman (1880–1963), Dutch-born Mormon hymnwriter
- Piet Kooyman (1929–1988), Dutch racing cyclist
- George Kooymans (1948–2025), Dutch guitarist and vocalist of Golden Earring

== See also ==
- Kooyman Peak, Antarctic mountain named for the American antarctic biologist Gerald L. Kooyman
