= Paula Dunn =

English sprinter

Personal information
- Nationality: British (English)
- Born: 3 December 1964 (age 61) Bradford, West Yorkshire, England

Sport
- Sport: Athletics
- Event: Sprints
- Club: Stretford AC
Medal record
Women's athletics
Representing Great Britain
European Championships
Bronze medal – third place	1990 Split	4×100 m
Representing England
Commonwealth Games
Gold medal – first place	1986 Edinburgh	4×100 m
Silver medal – second place	1986 Edinburgh	100 m
Silver medal – second place	1990 Auckland	4×100 m
Bronze medal – third place	1994 Victoria	100 m
Bronze medal – third place	1994 Victoria	4×100 m

Paula Dunn MBE, (formerly Thomas, born 3 December 1964) is an English former sprinter who competed in the 100 metres, 200 metres and 4 x 100 metres relay. She represented Great Britain in all three events at the 1988 Olympic Games in Seoul. She is a five-time Commonwealth Games medallist, including winning silver (1986) and bronze (1994) in the 100 metres. During the 1990s, she competed as Paula Thomas (her then married name). Her personal bests of 11.15 secs in the 100 metres and 22.69 secs in the 200 metres, were the fastest times run by a British female sprinter during the 1990s.

== Biography ==
Born Paula Dunn in Bradford, West Yorkshire, England, she was a member of the Trafford Athletics Club (formerly Stretford). She finished sixth in the 100 metres at the 1985 WAAA Championships, before making rapid progress in 1986, improving her 100 m PB from 11.67 to 11.25 secs (she also ran a wind-assisted 11.14), winning both the 1986 WAAA Championships and UK National 100 metres titles. At that year's Commonwealth Games in Edinburgh, she won a silver medal in the 100 metres, just one one-hundredth of a second behind the winner Heather Oakes but ahead of the Canadian Olympic finalists Angella Issajenko and Angela Bailey. She then teamed up with Oakes, Kathy Cook and Joan Baptiste to win gold in the 4×100 metres relay. Later that year she placed seventh in the 100 metres final at the European Championships in Stuttgart.

In 1987, Dunn competed at the World Championships in Rome, reaching the semi-finals in the 100 metres. At the 1988 Seoul Olympics, she reached the semi-finals of the 200 metres, and also competed in the 100 metres and 4×100 metres relay. She placed fourth in the 60 metres final at the 1989 European Indoor Championships, before going on to finish second at both 100 & 200 metres at the 1989 European Cup in Gateshead, finishing behind the East Germans Katrin Krabbe and Silke Moller respectively. Also in 1989, she won her fourth consecutive AAAs 100 metres title. Between August 1986 and January 1990, Dunn was unbeaten at 100 metres by another British woman.

In January 1990, she won relay silver at the Commonwealth Games in Auckland, with Stephanie Douglas, Jennifer Stoute and Simmone Jacobs. In the summer, competing under her then married name of Paula Thomas (she would be known by this name for the remainder of her athletic career before reverting to Dunn) she won a relay bronze medal at the European Championships in Split, along with Douglas Bev Kinch and Jacobs. She competed at the 1991 and 1993 World Championships. In 1992, she had missed the entire year due to pregnancy.

Dunn reached her peak in 1994, achieving her lifetime bests at that years Commonwealth Games in Victoria. In the 100 metres she won a bronze medal in 11.23 secs, having run her pb of 11.15 secs in the semi-finals. In the 200 metres, she narrowly missed a medal running another lifetime best of 22.69 secs. These times would remain the best sprint times of the decade by a British woman. She added another bronze in the sprint relay. In 1995, she competed at her fourth World Championships in Gothenburg, reaching the semi-finals in the 200 metres. She earned selection for the 1996 Olympic Games, but was forced to withdraw due to illness. As of 2019, Dunn ranks 10th on the UK all-time list at 100 metres and 12th at 200 metres.

== Later career ==
Dunn began working for UK Athletics in 2001 and was appointed Paralympic performance manager in 2009. After London 2012, she was promoted to the position of Paralympic head coach, replacing Peter Eriksson. She is the first female head coach appointed by UK Athletics.

== National titles ==
- 6 Times AAAs National Champion – 100 metres (1986, 1987, 1988, 1989, 1995) 200 metres (1989)
- 5 Times UK National Champion – 100 metres (1986, 1987, 1988) 200 metres (1987, 1988)
- 2 Time AAAs Indoor Champion – 60 metres (1987, 1988)

== Honours and awards ==
Dunn was appointed a Member of the Order of the British Empire (MBE) in the 2019 New Year Honours for services to Athletics.

== International competitions ==
Year	Competition	Venue	Position	Event	Notes
Representing Great Britain / England
1986	Commonwealth Games	Edinburgh, United Kingdom	2nd	100 m	11.21
1986	Commonwealth Games	Edinburgh, United Kingdom	1st	4 × 100 m	43.39
1986	European Championships	Stuttgart, West Germany	7th	100 m	11.25 (wind: +0.8 m/s)
1986	European Championships	Stuttgart, West Germany	5th	4 × 100 m	43.44
1987	European Indoor Championships	Lievin, France	6th	60 m	7.28
1987	World Championships	Rome, Italy	16th (sf)	100 m	11.59
1987	World Championships	Rome, Italy	10th (h)	4 × 100 m	44.21
1988	Olympic Games	Seoul, South Korea	22nd (qf)	100 m	11.37
1988	Olympic Games	Seoul, South Korea	14th (sf)	200 m	23.14
1988	Olympic Games	Seoul, South Korea	9th (sf)	4 × 100 m	43.50
1989	European Indoor Championships	The Hague, Netherlands	4th	60 m	7.24
1989	European Cup	Gateshead, United Kingdom	2nd	100 m	11.24
1989	European Cup	Gateshead, United Kingdom	2nd	200 m	23.45
1989	European Cup	Gateshead, United Kingdom	4th	4 × 100 m	
1990	Commonwealth Games	Auckland, New Zealand	8th	100 m	11.55
1990	Commonwealth Games	Auckland, New Zealand	5th	200 m	23.33
1990	Commonwealth Games	Auckland, New Zealand	2nd	4 × 100 m	44.15
1990	European Indoor Championships	Glasgow, United Kingdom	7th (sf)	60 m	7.30
1990	European Championships	Split, Yugoslavia	10th (sf)	100 m	11.57 (wind: 0.0 m/s)
1990	European Championships	Split, Yugoslavia	3rd	4 × 100 m	43.32
1991	World Championships	Tokyo, Japan	19th (qf)	100 m	11.51
1991	World Championships	Tokyo, Japan	heats	4 × 100 m	43.43
1993	World Championships	Stuttgart, Germany	8th	4 × 100 m	43.86
1994	European Cup	Birmingham, United Kingdom	2nd	4 × 100 m	43.46
1994	European Championships	Helsinki, Finland	10th (sf)	100 m	11.58 (wind: +0.6 m/s)
1994	European Championships	Helsinki, Finland	11th (sf)	200 m	23.41 (wind: +1.4 m/s)
1994	European Championships	Helsinki, Finland	5th	4 × 100 m	43.63
1994	Commonwealth Games	Victoria, Canada	3rd	100 m	11.23
1994	Commonwealth Games	Victoria, Canada	4th	200 m	22.69
1994	Commonwealth Games	Victoria, Canada	3rd	4 × 100 m	43.46
1994	World Cup	London, United Kingdom	7th	100 m	11.67
1994	World Cup	London, United Kingdom	6th	200 m	23.22
1994	World Cup	London, United Kingdom	8th	4 × 100 m	44.45
1995	World Championships	Gothenburg, Sweden	15th (qf)	100 m	11.33
1995	World Championships	Gothenburg, Sweden	15th (sf)	200 m	23.03
1995	World Championships	Gothenburg, Sweden	9th (h)	4 × 100 m	43.90
(#) indicates overall position in qualifying heats (h) quarterfinals (qf) or semifinals (sf)
