= Kooiman =

Kooiman is a Dutch language occupational surname. Kooi in the name means "cage" in Dutch, but generally referred to a pen or duck decoy, and the name often originated with a duck breeder, herder, or cage maker. Variant spellings are Cooiman, Kooimans, Coyman, Coymen, Kooijman(s), and Kooyman(s). People with the surname include:

- Anna Kooiman (born 1984), American television news anchor and personality
- Cle Kooiman (born 1963), American soccer defender
- Erik Jan Kooiman (born 1986), Dutch speed skater
- Esther Kooiman (born 1968), Dutch-French pornographic film actress
- Ewald Kooiman (1938–2009), Dutch organist
- Frank Kooiman (born 1970), Dutch football goalkeeper
- Jan Kooiman (born 1953), Dutch speed skater
- Nine Kooiman (born 1980), Dutch Socialist Party politician
- Wim Kooiman (born 1960), Dutch football defender
