= Minna Painilainen-Soon =

Finnish sprinter

Personal information
- Nationality: Finnish
- Born: 12 July 1964 (age 61)

Sport
- Sport: Sprinting
- Event: 4 × 100 metres relay

Minna Painilainen-Soon (born 12 July 1964) is a Finnish sprinter. She competed in the women's 4 × 100 metres relay at the 1992 Summer Olympics.
