= Viktor Zaytsev =

Uzbekistani javelin thrower

Medal record

Men's athletics

Representing Soviet Union

European Championships
Silver medal – second place	1990 Split	Javelin throw

Representing Uzbekistan

Asian Championships
Silver medal – second place	1995 Jakarta	Javelin throw

Viktor Zaytsev (Russian: Виктор Зайцев; born June 6, 1966) is a retired javelin thrower from Uzbekistan who competed for the Unified Team at the 1992 Summer Olympics in Barcelona, Spain. He did not reach the final. He won the silver medal two years earlier at the European Championships in Split, Yugoslavia. He was born in Tashkent, Uzbek SSR, Soviet Union.

== Achievements ==
Year	Competition	Venue	Position	Notes
Representing the Soviet Union
1990	Goodwill Games	Seattle, United States	1st	84.16 m
1990	European Championships	Split, FR Yugoslavia	2nd	83.30 m
1991	World Championships	Tokyo, Japan	32nd	72.48 m
Representing the Unified Team
1992	Olympic Games	Barcelona, Spain	13th	79.12 m
Representing the Uzbekistan
1993	World Championships	Stuttgart, Germany	32nd	73.22 m
1995	World Championships	Gothenburg, Sweden	30th	71.08 m
