= Karen van der Kooij =

Dutch sprinter

Personal information
- Nationality: Dutch
- Born: 26 December 1963 (age 61) The Hague, Netherlands

Sport
- Sport: Sprinting
- Event: 4 × 100 metres relay

Karen van der Kooij (born 26 December 1963) is a Dutch sprinter. She competed in the women's 4 × 100 metres relay at the 1992 Summer Olympics.
