= Volker Hadwich =

German javelin thrower

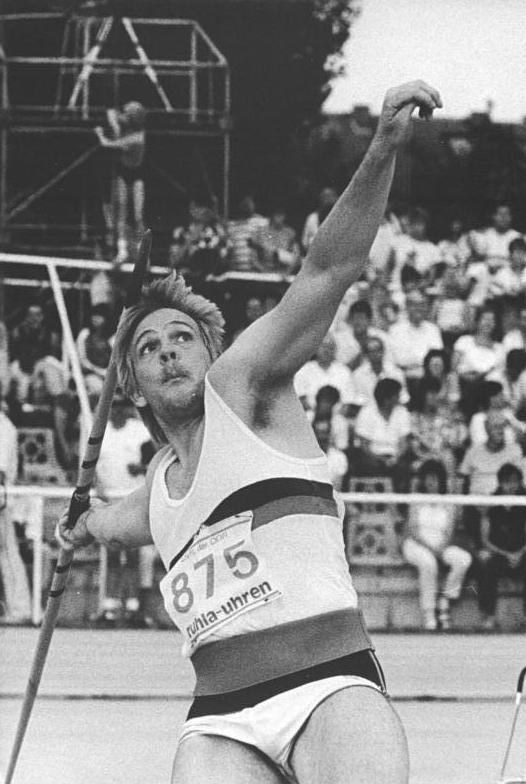
- Hadwich competing at the 1989 East German Championships

Personal information
- Born: 23 September 1964 (age 62) Magdeburg, East Germany

Sport
- Sport: Track and field
Medal record
Representing East Germany
Summer Universiade
Bronze medal – third place	1987 Zagreb	Javelin throw

Volker Hadwich (born 23 September 1964) is a German male former javelin thrower who competed for East Germany and Germany. Born in Magdeburg, during his career he competed for his hometown club SC Magdeburg and stood at 1.96 m, weighing 103 kg. He set his personal best of 84.84 m (278 ft 4 in) in 1989.

He threw beyond eighty metres for the first time in the 1986 season, achieving a best of 81.02 m (265 ft 9 3/4 in) in Erfurt, ranking in the world's top twenty that year. He had his first international success at the 1987 Universiade, where he was the bronze medallist behind Marek Kaleta and Sejad Krdžalic.

The 1989 season was the peak of his career. He won his first national title at the East German Athletics Championships with a meet record throw of 84.06 m (275 ft 9 1/4 in). He was the bronze medallist at both the 1989 European Cup and 1989 IAAF World Cup, with Steve Backley being the winner at both events. He ended the year second on the European rankings to Backley, courtesy of a lifetime best performance of 84.84 m (278 ft 4 in) in Macerata, which made him the fourth best athlete in the world in 1989.

After missing much of the 1990 and 1991 seasons due to injury, he returned to claim the second and final national title of his career at the German Athletics Championships, throwing 82.26 m (269 ft 10 1/2 in) (his best that year). As a result he was chosen to represent Germany at the 1992 Summer Olympics.

Later investigation of leaked Stasi files showed Hadwich had failed doping tests for abnormal levels of testosterone, which were subsequently covered up by the national sports body.

== International competitions ==
Year	Competition	Venue	Position	Event	Notes
1987	Universiade	Zagreb, Yugoslavia	3rd	Javelin throw	78.82 m
1989	European Cup	Gateshead, United Kingdom	3rd	Javelin throw	79.38 m
1989	IAAF World Cup	Barcelona, Spain	3rd	Javelin throw	80.30 m
1992	Olympic Games	Barcelona, Spain	12th	Javelin throw	75.28 m

== National titles ==
- East German Athletics Championships
  - Javelin throw: 1989
- German Athletics Championships
  - Javelin throw: 1992

== Seasonal progression ==
- 1986: 81.02 m
- 1987: 80.74 m
- 1988: 81.26 m
- 1989: 84.84 m
- 1992: 82.26 m
