= Carlette Guidry-White =

American sprinter

Personal information
- Born: September 4, 1968 (age 57) Houston, Texas, U.S.
Medal record
Women's athletics
Representing the United States
Olympic Games
Gold medal – first place	1992 Barcelona	4 × 100 metres relay
Gold medal – first place	1996 Atlanta	4 × 100 metres relay
World Championships
Gold medal – first place	1995 Gothenburg	4 × 100 metres relay
World Indoor Championships
Bronze medal – third place	1995 Barcelona	60 metres
World Junior Championships
Gold medal – first place	1986 Athens	4 × 100 metres relay

Carlette Denise Guidry-Falkquay (formerly Guidry-White, née Guidry; born September 4, 1968) is an American former sprinter who won gold medals in the 4 × 100 metres relay at the 1992 Barcelona Olympics, the 1996 Atlanta Olympics and the 1995 World Championships in Gothenburg. Her individual results include winning the 100 metres title at the 1990 Goodwill Games and a bronze medal in the 60 metres at the 1995 World Indoor Championships.

== Career ==
Born Carlette D. Guidry in Houston, Texas in 1968, she finished eighth in the 100 metres final at the 1991 World Championships in Tokyo, before going on to win Olympic relay gold at the 1992 Barcelona Olympics, where she also finished fifth in the 200 metres final. She won a bronze medal in the 60 metres event at the 1995 IAAF World Indoor Championships., and also finished fourth in the World Championships 100 metres final that year. At the 1996 Atlanta Olympics, she won a second Olympic relay gold (she ran in the heats but not the final) and finished eighth in the 200 metres final.

At the collegiate level, Guidry competed for the Texas Longhorns of the University of Texas at Austin between 1987 and 1991. She collected a total of twelve NCAA titles, and was named Southwest Conference Athlete of the Decade in indoor track and outdoor track and field for the 1980s. She was also honored as Indoor Track and Field Most Outstanding Student-Athletes in Honor of the 25th Anniversary of NCAA Women's Championships.

While at University of Texas, she won the Honda-Broderick Award (now the Honda Sports Award) as the nation's best female collegiate track and field competitor in 1991. She was Inducted into the Texas Track and Field Coaches Hall of Fame, Class of 2014.

== International competitions ==
Year	Competition	Venue	Position	Event	Notes
Representing United States
1986	Pan American Junior Championships	Winter Park, United States	1st	100 m	23.73
1986	Pan American Junior Championships	Winter Park, United States	1st	Long jump	6.42 m
1986	Pan American Junior Championships	Winter Park, United States	1st	4 × 100 m	44.62
1986	World Junior Championships	Athens, Greece	4th	200 m	23.46
1986	World Junior Championships	Athens, Greece	7th	Long jump	6.13 m
1986	World Junior Championships	Athens, Greece	1st	4 × 100 m	43.78
1990	Goodwill Games	Seattle, United States	1st	100 m	11.03
1990	Goodwill Games	Seattle, United States	1st	4 × 100 m	42.46
1991	World Championships	Tokyo, Japan	8th	100 m	11.52
1991	World Championships	Tokyo, Japan	heats	4 × 100 m	DNF
1992	Olympic Games	Barcelona, Spain	5th	200 m	22.30
1992	Olympic Games	Barcelona, Spain	1st	4 × 100 m	42.11
1995	World Indoor Championships	Barcelona, Spain	3rd	60 m	7.11
1995	World Championships	Gothenburg, Sweden	4th	100 m	11.07
1995	World Championships	Gothenburg, Sweden	11th (sf)	200 m	22.91
1995	World Championships	Gothenburg, Sweden	1st	4 × 100 m	42.12
1996	Olympic Games	Atlanta, United States	8th	200 m	22.61
1996	Olympic Games	Atlanta, United States	1st	4 × 100 m	42.49 (heats)
1998	World Cup	Johannesburg, South Africa	1st	4 × 100 m	42.00
(sf) = Indicates overall position in semifinals

== Personal bests ==
- 100 metres – 10.94 (1991)
- 200 metres – 22.14 (1996)
- 400 metres – 51.53 (1994)

== External ==
- Carlette Guidry-White at World Athletics
