= Melissa Moore (athlete) =

Australian sprinter

Personal information
- Nationality: Australian
- Born: 7 June 1968 (age 58) Sydney, Australia

Sport
- Sport: Sprinting
- Event: 200 metres

Melissa Moore (born 7 June 1968) is an Australian sprinter. She competed in the women's 200 metres at the 1992 Summer Olympics. She also participated in the 2000 Summer Olympics.
