= Stephi Douglas =

English sprinter

Personal information
- Nationality: British
- Born: 22 January 1969 (age 57) Manchester, England
- Height: 1.66 m (5 ft 5 in)
- Weight: 60 kg (132 lb)

Sport
- Sport: Track and field
- Event: Sprints
- Club: Sale Harriers
Medal record
Women's athletics
Representing Great Britain
European Championships
| Bronze medal – third place | 1990 Split | 4×100 m |
Representing England
Commonwealth Games
| Silver medal – second place | 1990 Auckland | 4×100 m |
| Bronze medal – third place | 1994 Victoria | 4×100 m |

Lana Stephanie "Stephi" Douglas (born 22 January 1969) is an British retired athlete who specialised in sprinting events and represented Great Britain at the 1992 and 1996 Summer Olympics

== Biography ==
Douglas represented England and won a silver medal in the 4 x 100 metres relay event, at the 1990 Commonwealth Games in Auckland, New Zealand. Shortly afterwards she became the British 100 metres champion after winning the British AAA Championships title at the 1990 AAA Championships. In 1991 Douglas won the 200 metres AAA title.

At the 1992 Olympic Games in Barcelona, she represented Great Britain in the 100 metres event and represented England at the 1994 Commonwealth Games in Victoria, winning a bronze medal in the 4 x 100 metres relay event.

At the 1996 Olympic Games in Atlanta, she represented Great Britain again in the 100 metres. The same year she won another 100 metres AAA title at the 1996 AAA Championships.

== Competition record ==
| Year | Competition | Venue | Position | Event | Notes |
Representing Great Britain and England
| 1987 | European Junior Championships | Birmingham, United Kingdom | 5th | 100 m | 11.73 |
| 1987 | European Junior Championships | Birmingham, United Kingdom | 11th (h) | 100 m hurdles | 14.28 |
| 1987 | European Junior Championships | Birmingham, United Kingdom | 5th | 4 × 100 m relay | 45.87 |
| 1988 | World Junior Championships | Sudbury, Canada | 10th (sf) | 100 m | 11.79 |
| 1988 | World Junior Championships | Sudbury, Canada | 5th | 4 × 100 m relay | 44.91 |
| 1990 | Commonwealth Games | Auckland, New Zealand | 4th | 100 m | 11.39 |
| 1990 | Commonwealth Games | Auckland, New Zealand | 2nd | 4 × 100 m relay | 44.15 |
| 1990 | European Indoor Championships | Glasgow, United Kingdom | 9th (sf) | 60 m | 7.32 |
| 1990 | European Championships | Split, Yugoslavia | 8th | 100 m | 11.46 |
| 1990 | European Championships | Split, Yugoslavia | 3rd | 4 × 100 m relay | 43.32 |
| 1991 | World Indoor Championships | Seville, Spain | 12th (sf) | 60 m | 7.32 |
| 1991 | World Championships | Tokyo, Japan | 23rd (qf) | 100 m | 11.58 |
| 1991 | World Championships | Tokyo, Japan | 10th (h) | 4 × 100 m relay | 43.43 |
| 1992 | Olympic Games | Barcelona, Spain | 30th (qf) | 100 m | 11.77 |
| 1994 | European Championships | Helsinki, Finland | 12th (sf) | 100 m | 11.60 |
| 1994 | European Championships | Helsinki, Finland | 5th | 4 × 100 m relay | 43.63 |
| 1994 | Commonwealth Games | Victoria, Canada | 8th | 100 m | 11.48 |
| 1994 | Commonwealth Games | Victoria, Canada | 10th (sf) | 200 m | 23.67 |
| 1994 | Commonwealth Games | Victoria, Canada | 3rd | 4 × 100 m relay | 43.46 |
| 1995 | World Indoor Championships | Barcelona, Spain | 12th (sf) | 60 m | 7.30 |
| 1995 | World Championships | Gothenburg, Sweden | 40th (h) | 100 m | 11.67 |
| 1996 | Olympic Games | Atlanta, United States | 26th (qf) | 100 m | 11.75 |

== Personal bests ==
Outdoor

- 100 metres – 11.27 (+1.6 m/s, Birmingham 1991)
- 200 metres – 23.17 (Sheffield 1994)

Indoor

- 60 metres – 7.21 (Glasgow 1995)
- 200 metres – 23.85 (Fürth 2000)

== Personal life ==
Stephi has one daughter named Jorja who is a member of the girl group FLO. The two appeared on Series 2 of Got What It Takes?, winning the competition and earning a chance to perform on the Main Stage at BBC Radio 1's Big Weekend.

Douglas is also a fan of English football side Manchester City.
