= Fuente del Maestre =

- Municipality
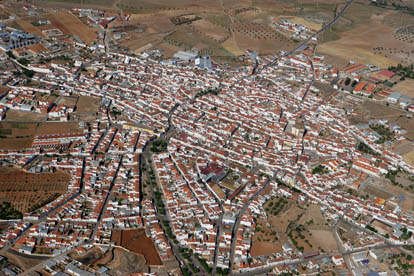
- Panoramic view

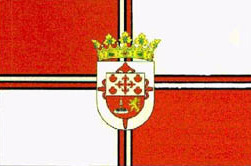
- Flag Coat of arms

- Location of Fuente del Maestre within Extremadura Fuente del Maestre (Extremadura)
- Coordinates: 38°31′44″N 6°27′00″W
- Country: Spain
- Autonomous Community: Extremadura
- Province: Badajoz
- Comarca: Zafra - Río Bodión

Government
  - Mayor: Juan Antonio Barrios García (PP)

Area
  - Total: 180 km^{2} (69 sq mi)
- Elevation (AMSL): 442 m (1,450 ft)

Population (2025-01-01)
  - Total: 6,499
  - Density: 36/km^{2} (94/sq mi)
- Time zone: UTC+1 (CET)
  - Summer (DST): UTC+2 (CEST (GMT +2))
- Postal code: 06360
- Area code: +34 (Spain) + 924 (Badajoz)
- Website: www.fuentedelmaestre.es

Fuente del Maestre is a municipality in the province of Badajoz, Extremadura, Spain. It has a population of 6,943 and an area of 180 km^{2}.

== See also ==
- List of municipalities in Badajoz
