= 1990 European Athletics Championships =

15th European Athletics Championships
- The logo of the 1990 European Athletics Championships
- Dates: 26 August - 2 September
- Host city: Split, Yugoslavia
- Venue: Stadion Poljud
- Level: Senior
- Type: Outdoor
- Events: 43
- Participation: 952 athletes from 33 nations

The 15th European Athletics Championships were held from 26 August to 2 September 1990 in Split, Croatia, SFR Yugoslavia. The host stadium was Stadion Poljud.

It was the last participation of East Germany (which was already scheduled to be merged with the Federal Republic), the Soviet Union, Czechoslovakia, and SFR Yugoslavia.

== Men's results ==
Complete results were published.

=== Track ===
1982 |1986 |1990 |1994 |1998 |

Event	Gold		Silver		Bronze	
100 m	Linford Christie; Great Britain	10.00	Daniel Sangouma; France	10.04	John Regis; Great Britain	10.07
200 m	John Regis; Great Britain	20.11	Jean-Charles Trouabal; France	20.31	Linford Christie; Great Britain	20.33
400 m	Roger Black; Great Britain	45.08	Thomas Schönlebe; East Germany	45.13	Jens Carlowitz; East Germany	45.27
800 m	Tom McKean; Great Britain	1:44.76	David Sharpe; Great Britain	1:45.59	Piotr Piekarski; Poland	1:45.76
1500 m	Jens-Peter Herold; East Germany	3:38.25	Gennaro Di Napoli; Italy	3:38.60	Mário Silva; Portugal	3:38.73
5000 m	Salvatore Antibo; Italy	13:22.00	Gary Staines; Great Britain	13:22.45	Sławomir Majusiak; Poland	13:22.92
10,000 m	Salvatore Antibo; Italy	27:41.27	Are Nakkim; Norway	28:04.04	Stefano Mei; Italy	28:04.46
Marathon	Gelindo Bordin; Italy	2:14:02	Gianni Poli; Italy	2:14:55	Dominique Chauvelier; France	2:15:20
110 metres hurdles	Colin Jackson; Great Britain	13.18	Tony Jarrett; Great Britain	13.21	Dietmar Koszewski; West Germany	13.50
400 metres hurdles	Kriss Akabusi; Great Britain	47.92	Sven Nylander; Sweden	48.43	Niklas Wallenlind; Sweden	48.52
3000 metres steeplechase	Francesco Panetta; Italy	8:12.66	Mark Rowland; Great Britain	8:13.27	Alessandro Lambruschini; Italy	8:15.82
20 kilometres walk	Pavol Blažek; Czechoslovakia	1:22:05	Daniel Plaza; Spain	1:22:22	Thierry Toutain; France	1:23:22
50 kilometres walk	Andrey Perlov; Soviet Union	3:54:36	Bernd Gummelt; East Germany	3:56:33	Hartwig Gauder; East Germany	4:00:48
4 × 100 metres relay	Max Morinière; Daniel Sangouma; Jean-Charles Trouabal; Bruno Marie-Rose; France (FRA)	37.79 (WR)	Darren Braithwaite; John Regis; Marcus Adam; Linford Christie; Great Britain (GBR)	37.98	Mario Longo; Ezio Madonia; Sandro Floris; Stefano Tilli; Italy (ITA)	38.39
4 × 400 metres relay	Paul Sanders; Kriss Akabusi; John Regis; Roger Black; Great Britain (GBR)	2:58.22	Klaus Just; Edgar Itt; Carsten Köhrbrück; Norbert Dobeleit; West Germany (FRG)	3:00.64	Rico Lieder; Karsten Just; Thomas Schönlebe; Jens Carlowitz; East Germany (GDR)	3:01.51

=== Field ===
1982 |1986 |1990 |1994 |1998 |

Event	Gold		Silver		Bronze	
High jump	Dragutin Topić; Yugoslavia	2.34	Aleksey Yemelin; Soviet Union	2.34	Georgi Dakov; Bulgaria	2.34
Long jump	Dietmar Haaf; West Germany	8.25	Ángel Hernández; Spain	8.15	Borut Bilač^{†} Yugoslavia	8.09
Pole vault	Radion Gataullin; Soviet Union	5.85	Grigoriy Yegorov; Soviet Union	5.75	Hermann Fehringer; Austria	5.75
Triple jump	Leonid Voloshin; Soviet Union	17.74	Khristo Markov; Bulgaria	17.43	Igor Lapshin; Soviet Union	17.34
Shot put^{‡}	Ulf Timmermann; East Germany	21.32	Oliver-Sven Buder; East Germany	21.01	Georg Andersen; Norway	20.71
Discus throw	Jürgen Schult; East Germany	64.58	Erik de Bruin; Netherlands	64.46	Wolfgang Schmidt; West Germany	64.10
Javelin throw	Steve Backley; Great Britain	87.30	Viktor Zaytsev; Soviet Union	83.30	Patrik Bodén; Sweden	82.66
Hammer throw	Igor Astapkovich; Soviet Union	84.14	Tibor Gécsek; Hungary	80.14	Igor Nikulin; Soviet Union	80.02
Decathlon	Christian Plaziat; France	8,574	Dezső Szabó; Hungary	8,436	Christian Schenk; East Germany	8,433

^{†}: In long jump, bronze medalist Borut Bilač from Yugoslavia was initially disqualified for a suspected infringement of IAAF doping rules, but was later cleared of the charges and reinstated.
^{‡}: In shot put, Vyacheslav Lykho from the Soviet Union ranked initially 3rd (20.81m), but was disqualified for infringement of IAAF doping rules.

== Women's results ==
=== Track ===
1982 |1986 |1990 |1994 |1998 |

Event	Gold		Silver		Bronze	
100 metres	Katrin Krabbe; East Germany	10.89; CR	Silke Möller; East Germany	11.10	Kerstin Behrendt; East Germany	11.17
200 metres	Katrin Krabbe; East Germany	21.95	Heike Drechsler; East Germany	22.19	Galina Malchugina; Soviet Union	22.23
400 metres	Grit Breuer; East Germany	49.50	Petra Schersing; East Germany	50.51	Marie-José Pérec; France	50.84
800 metres	Sigrun Wodars; East Germany	1:55.87	Christine Wachtel; East Germany	1:56.11	Liliya Nurutdinova; Soviet Union	1:57.39
1500 metres	Snežana Pajkić; Yugoslavia	4:08.12	Ellen Kiessling; East Germany	4:08.67	Sandra Gasser; Switzerland	4:08.89
3000 metres	Yvonne Murray; Great Britain	8:43.06	Yelena Romanova; Soviet Union	8:43.68	Roberta Brunet; Italy	8:46.19
10,000 metres	Yelena Romanova; Soviet Union	31:46.83	Kathrin Ullrich; East Germany	31:47.70	Annette Sergent; France	31:51.68
Marathon	Rosa Mota; Portugal	2: 31:27	Valentina Yegorova; Soviet Union	2: 31:32	Maria Rebelo; France	2: 35:51
100 metres hurdles	Monique Ewanje-Epée; France	12.79	Gloria Siebert; East Germany	12.91	Lidiya Yurkova; Soviet Union	12.92
400 metres hurdles	Tatyana Ledovskaya; Soviet Union	53.62	Anita Protti; Switzerland	54.36	Monica Westén; Sweden	54.75
10 kilometres walk	Annarita Sidoti; Italy	44:00	Olga Kardopoltseva; Soviet Union	44:06	Ileana Salvador; Italy	44:38
4 × 100 metres relay	Silke Möller; Katrin Krabbe; Kerstin Behrendt; Sabine Günther; East Germany	41.68	Gabi Lippe; Ulrike Sarvari; Andrea Thomas; Silke Knoll; West Germany	43.02	Stephanie Douglas; Beverly Kinch; Simone Jacobs; Paula Thomas; Great Britain	43.32
4 × 400 metres relay	Manuela Derr; Annett Hesselbarth; Petra Schersing; Grit Breuer; East Germany	3:21.02	Yelena Vinogradova; Lyudmila Dzhigalova; Tatyana Ledovskaya; Yelena Ruzina; Soviet Union	3:23.34	Sally Gunnell; Jennifer Stoute; Patricia Beckford; Linda Keough; Great Britain	3:24.78

=== Field ===
1982 |1986 |1990 |1994 |1998 |

Event	Gold		Silver		Bronze	
High jump	Heike Henkel; West Germany	1.99	Biljana Petrović; Yugoslavia	1.96	Yelena Yelesina; Soviet Union	1.96
Long jump	Heike Drechsler; East Germany	7.30	Marieta Ilcu; Romania	7.02	Helga Radtke; East Germany	6.94
Shot put	Astrid Kumbernuss; East Germany	20.38	Natalya Lisovskaya; Soviet Union	20.06	Kathrin Neimke; East Germany	19.96
Discus throw	Ilke Wyludda; East Germany	68.46	Olga Burova; Soviet Union	66.72	Martina Hellmann; East Germany	66.66
Javelin throw	Päivi Alafrantti; Finland	67.68	Karen Forkel; East Germany	67.56	Petra Felke; East Germany	66.56
Heptathlon	Sabine Braun; West Germany	6688	Heike Tischler; East Germany	6572	Peggy Beer; East Germany	6531

== Medal table ==
* Host nation (Yugoslavia)

Rank	Nation	Gold	Silver	Bronze	Total
1	East Germany (GDR)	12	12	10	34
2	Great Britain (GBR)	9	5	4	18
3	Soviet Union (URS)	6	9	6	21
4	Italy (ITA)	5	2	5	12
5	France (FRA)	3	2	5	10
6	West Germany (FRG)	3	2	2	7
7	Yugoslavia (YUG)*	2	1	1	4
8	Portugal (POR)	1	0	1	2
9	Czechoslovakia (TCH)	1	0	0	1
9	Finland (FIN)	1	0	0	1
11	Hungary (HUN)	0	2	0	2
11	Spain (ESP)	0	2	0	2
13	Sweden (SWE)	0	1	3	4
14	Bulgaria (BUL)	0	1	1	2
14	Norway (NOR)	0	1	1	2
14	Switzerland (SUI)	0	1	1	2
17	Netherlands (NED)	0	1	0	1
17	Romania (ROU)	0	1	0	1
19	Poland (POL)	0	0	2	2
20	Austria (AUT)	0	0	1	1
Totals (20 entries)		43	43	43	129

== Participation ==
According to an unofficial count, 914 athletes from 33 countries participated in the event, 39 athletes less than the official number of 952 as published.

- Albania (2)
- Austria (11)
- Belgium (19)
- Bulgaria (20)
- Cyprus (4)
- Czechoslovakia (17)
- Denmark (7)
- East Germany (67)
- Finland (45)
- France (67)
- Great Britain (95)
- Greece (11)
- Hungary (32)
- Iceland (6)
- Ireland (14)
- Israel (3)
- Italy (61)
- Liechtenstein (2)
- Luxembourg (1)
- Malta (1)
- Netherlands (17)
- Norway (18)
- Poland (18)
- Portugal (32)
- Romania (21)
- San Marino (1)
- Soviet Union (97)
- Spain (61)
- Sweden (25)
- Switzerland (18)
- Turkey (8)
- West Germany (68)
- Yugoslavia (45)

== See also ==
- 1990 in athletics (track and field)
