= Andrea Thomas (German athlete) =

German sprinter (born 1963)

Andrea I. Thomas
Personal information
- Other names: Andrea Bersch
- Born: April 9, 1963 (age 63) Güls
- Occupation: Professional sprinter
Medal record
Women's athletics
Representing West Germany
European Championships
Silver medal – second place	1990 Split	4×100 m

Andrea Irmgard Thomas (née Bersch; born 9 April 1963 in Güls) is a retired German sprinter who specialized in the 200 metres. At the 1987 World Championships in Athletics in Rome she finished fifth in 4 × 100 m relay for West Germany. At the 1988 Summer Olympics in Seoul she finished fourth in 4 × 100 m relay and 4 × 400 m relay. At the 1990 European Championships in Athletics in Split she won a silver medal in 4 × 100 m relay for West Germany together with Gabi Lippe, Ulrike Sarvari and Silke Knoll. In addition she finished eighth in 200 metres and fourth in 4 × 400 m relay.

== International competitions ==
Year	Competition	Venue	Position	Event	Notes
Representing West Germany
1987	World Championships	Rome, Italy	5th	4 × 100 m	43.30
1988	European Indoor Championships	Budapest, Hungary	13th (h)	200 m	23.87
1988	Olympic Games	Seoul, South Korea	13th (sf)	200 m	22.91
1988	Olympic Games	Seoul, South Korea	4th	4 × 100 m	42.76
1988	Olympic Games	Seoul, South Korea	4th	4 × 400 m	3:22.49
1990	European Championships	Split, Yugoslavia	8th	200 m	23.01
1990	European Championships	Split, Yugoslavia	2nd	4 × 100 m	43.09
1990	European Championships	Split, Yugoslavia	4th	4 × 400 m	3:25.16
Representing Germany
1991	World Indoor Championships	Seville, Spain	4th	200 m	22.94
1992	Olympic Games	Barcelona, Spain	21st (qf)	200 m	23.19
1992	Olympic Games	Barcelona, Spain	5th	4 × 100 m	43.12
(#) Indicates overall position in qualifying heats (h) quarterfinals (qf) or semifinals (sf)
