= Kerstin Behrendt =

East German sprinter (born 1967)

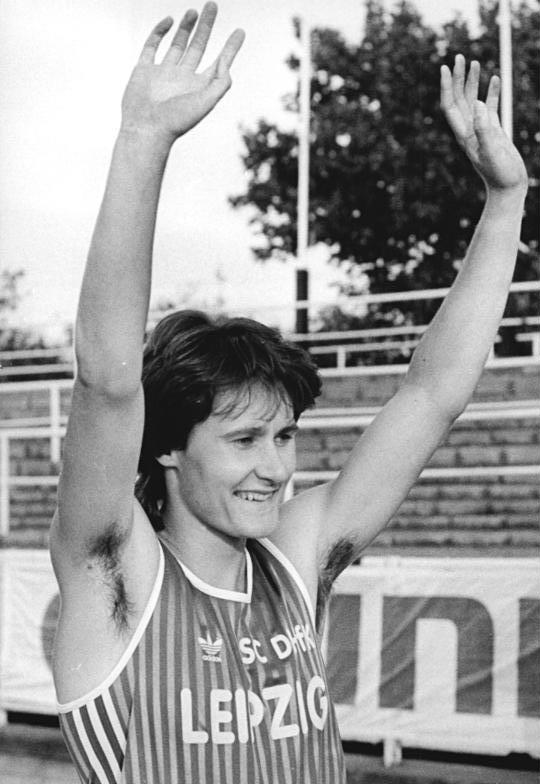
- Behrendt at the East German Championships 1990

Medal record

Women's athletics

Representing East Germany

Olympic Games
Silver medal – second place	1988 Seoul	4×100 m

World Championships
Silver medal – second place	1987 Rome	4×100 m

European Championships
Gold medal – first place	1990 Split	4×100 m
Bronze medal – third place	1990 Split	100 m

Kerstin Behrendt (born 2 September 1967 in Leisnig) is a former German athlete, who mainly competed in the 100 m during her career.

Behrendt competed for East Germany at the 1988 Summer Olympics held in Seoul, South Korea, where she won the silver medal in the women's 4 × 100 m relay with her teammates Silke Möller, Ingrid Auerswald and Marlies Göhr.

== See also ==
- German all-time top lists – 200 metres
