= Ulrike Sarvari =

German sprinter

Personal information
- Born: 22 June 1964 (age 62) Heidelberg, West Germany

Sport
- Sport: Track and field
Medal record
Representing West Germany
European Championships
Silver medal – second place	1990 Split	4×100 m relay
European Indoor Championships
Gold medal – first place	1990 Glasgow	60 m
Gold medal – first place	1990 Glasgow	200 m
Summer Universiade
Bronze medal – third place	1989 Duisburg	4x100 m relay

Ulrike Sarvari (born 22 June 1964) is a retired German sprinter.

Sarvari finished fifth in the 4 × 100 metres relay for West Germany at the 1987 World Championships in Athletics and fourth in the 1988 Summer Olympics in Seoul. She finished sixth in the 60 metre race at the 1989 IAAF World Indoor Championships.

Sarvari's greatest success came at the 1990 European Indoor Championships in Glasgow, where she won both the 60 m and the 200 m. Sarvari is the only woman to achieve this double in the history of the European Indoor Championships.

At the 1990 European Championships in Athletics in Split, Sarvari was seventh in the 100 metres and won a silver medal in the 4 × 100 m relay for West Germany, together with Gabi Lippe, Andrea Thomas and Silke Knoll.

== Achievements ==
Year	Competition	Venue	Position	Event	Notes
Representing West Germany
1986	European Championships	Stuttgart, West Germany	14th (sf)	100 m	11.53 secs
1987	European Indoor Championships	Lievin, France	9th (sf)	60 m	7.37
1987	World Championships	Rome, Italy	11th (sf)	100 m	11.15
1987	World Championships	Rome, Italy	13th (sf)	200 m	23.04
1987	World Championships	Rome, Italy	5th	4 × 100 m	43.20
1988	European Indoor Championships	Budapest, Hungary	4th	60 m	7.18
1988	Olympic Games	Seoul, South Korea	9th (sf)	100 m	11.12
1988	Olympic Games	Seoul, South Korea	4th	4 × 100 m	42.76
1989	World Indoor Championships	Budapest, Hungary	6th	60 m	7.29
1990	European Indoor Championships	Glasgow, Scotland	1st	60 m	7.10
1990	European Indoor Championships	Glasgow, Scotland	1st	200 m	22.96
1990	European Championships	Split, Yugoslavia	7th	100 m	11.41
1990	European Championships	Split, Yugoslavia	2nd	4 × 100 m	43.09
(#) Indicates overall position in semifinals (sf)
