= Simmone Jacobs =

British sprinter (born 1966)

Personal information
- Nationality: British (English)
- Born: 5 September 1966 (age 59) Reading, Berkshire, England
- Height: 155 cm (5 ft 1 in)
- Weight: 51 kg (112 lb)

Sport
- Sport: Athletics
- Event: Sprints
- Club: Reading Athletic Club; Shaftesbury Barnet Harriers
Medal record
Women's athletics
Representing Great Britain
Olympic Games
Bronze medal – third place	1984 Los Angeles	4x100 m
European Championships
Bronze medal – third place	1990 Split	4×100 m
Representing England
Commonwealth Games
Silver medal – second place	1990 Auckland	4×100 m
Bronze medal – third place	1994 Victoria	4×100 m
Bronze medal – third place	1998 Kuala Lumpur	4×100 m

Kim Simmone Geraldine Jacobs (born 5 September 1966) is a female retired British athlete who competed in the 100 metres and 200 metres. She represented Great Britain at four Olympic Games (1984–96), winning a bronze medal as a 17-year-old at the 1984 Los Angeles Olympics in the 4 x 100 metres relay. She also won a relay bronze medal at the 1990 European Championships and relay medals at three Commonwealth Games.

== Biography ==
Jacobs was born in Reading, Berkshire, and was a member of the Reading Athletic Club and later Shaftesbury Barnet Harriers. Her career best times are 11.31 secs for 100 metres (1988) and 22.95 for the 200 metres (1996). She won the AAA Championships 200 metres title in 1986, 1988 and 1996, and the UK Championship 200 metres title in 1997. A talented junior, she won three medals at the 1983 European Junior Championships and won an Olympic bronze medal aged 17, along with Heather Oakes, Kathy Cook and Bev Callender, with Jacobs replacing an injured Shirley Thomas in the British sprint relay squad at the 1984 Los Angeles Olympics.

She also won sprint relay bronze at the 1990 European Championships; relay silver at the 1990 Commonwealth Games, and relay bronzes at the 1994 and 1998 Commonwealth Games. Her other individual results include finishing fourth in the 200 metres final at the 1986 Commonwealth Games in Edinburgh (just 0.02 from a medal), and seventh in the 100 metres final at the 1990 Commonwealth Games in Auckland.

== International competitions ==
Year	Competition	Venue	Position	Event	Notes
Representing the Great Britain / England
1983	European Junior Championships	Schwechat, Austria	2nd	100 m	11.59 sec
1983	European Junior Championships	Schwechat, Austria	3rd	200 m	23.28
1983	European Junior Championships	Schwechat, Austria	3rd	4 × 100 m	44.86
1984	Olympic Games	Los Angeles, United States	3rd	4 × 100 m	43.11
1986	Commonwealth Games	Edinburgh, Scotland	4th	200 m	23.48
1987	World Championships	Rome, Italy	quarter-final	100m	11.83
1988	Olympic Games	Seoul, South Korea	quarter-final	100 m	11.31
1988	Olympic Games	Seoul, South Korea	quarter-final	200 m	23.38
1988	Olympic Games	Seoul, South Korea	semi-final	4 × 100 m	43.50
1990	Commonwealth Games	Auckland, New Zealand	7th	100 m	11.53
1990	Commonwealth Games	Auckland, New Zealand	2nd	4 × 100 m	44.15
1990	European Championships	Split, Yugoslavia	3rd	4 × 100 m	43.32
1991	World Championships	Tokyo, Japan	semi-final	200m	23.72 (23.37)
1991	World Championships	Tokyo, Japan	heats	4 × 100 m	43.43
1992	Olympic Games	Barcelona, Spain	quarter-final	200 m	23.61
1993	World Championships	Stuttgart, Germany	8th	4 × 100 m	43.83
1994	European Championships	Helsinki, Finland	18th (h)	200m	23.75 (wind: -2.1 m/s)
1994	European Championships	Helsinki, Finland	5th	4 × 100 m relay	43.63
1994	Commonwealth Games	Victoria, Canada	semi-final	100m	11.47
1994	Commonwealth Games	Victoria, Canada	3rd	4 × 100 m	43.46
1994	World Cup	London, United Kingdom	8th	4 × 100 m	44.45
1996	Olympic Games	Atlanta, United States	quarter-final	200 m	22.96
1996	Olympic Games	Atlanta, United States	8th	4 × 100 m	43.93
1998	Commonwealth Games	Kuala Lumpur, Malaysia	semi-final	100 m	11.71
1998	Commonwealth Games	Kuala Lumpur, Malaysia	semi-final	200 m	23.73
1998	Commonwealth Games	Kuala Lumpur, Malaysia	3rd	4 × 100 m	43.69
