= Athletics at the 1988 Summer Olympics – Women's 4 × 100 metres relay =

Women's 4 × 100 metres relay at the Games of the XXIV Olympiad
- Venue: Seoul Olympic Stadium
- Dates: 30 September 1988 (heats); 1 October 1988 (semifinals and finals)
- Competitors: 81 from 19 nations
- Teams: 19
- Winning time: 41.98

Medalists
1st place, gold medalist(s)		United States; Alice Brown; Sheila Echols; Florence Griffith Joyner; Evelyn Ashford; Dannette Young*
2nd place, silver medalist(s)		East Germany; Silke Möller; Kerstin Behrendt; Ingrid Lange; Marlies Göhr
3rd place, bronze medalist(s)		Soviet Union; Lyudmila Kondratieva; Galina Malchugina; Marina Zhirova; Natalya Pomoshchnikova

These are the official results of the women's 4 × 100 m relay event at the 1988 Summer Olympics in Seoul, South Korea. There were a total number of 19 nations competing.

This was a race between three strong teams with many athletes at their peak. From the gun, Alice Brown was out fastest for the US in lane 6, almost making up the stagger on Zvetanka Ilieva leading off for Bulgaria on her outside. Meanwhile, East German star, 1987 World Champion Silke Möller was losing ground in lane 5 as Soviet Lyudmila Kondratyeva was gaining in lane 4. All the handoffs were efficient before both Kerstin Behrendt and Galina Malchugina closed the gap on the American Sheila Echols on the second leg. The American handoff to the year's phenom, world record holder Florence Griffith Joyner was safe but not particularly efficient, the East German underhanded pass to Ingrid Auerswald is a textbook demonstration of an efficient handoff, and gave East Germany the lead. It would still be expected that the way FloJo dominated the sprint events, she would be able to pull away from Auerswald, but running the longer distance around the turn she only made a marginal gain and Marina Zhirova also put the Soviet team in close contention. Both the Soviet team and East German teams executed efficient handoffs, leaving Natalya Pomoshchnikova just slightly behind 1983 World Champion Marlies Göhr. The American handoff was not as efficient as Griffith-Joyner ran up on veteran anchor Evelyn Ashford leaving USA two metres behind. Pomoshchnikova accelerated and was able to pull even with Göhr while Ashford was in full stride and gaining. 50 metres from the finish it was three abreast across the center of the track. Ashford continued right past Göhr to a meter and a half victory. The three teams were so far ahead of the rest of the world that Pomoshchnikova, despite pulling a muscle 30 m from the finish, was able to limp across the finish line ahead of the West German team for the bronze medal.

== Records ==
These were the standing World and Olympic records (in seconds) prior to the 1988 Summer Olympics.

World record	41.37	(East Germany) Silke Gladisch (East Germany) Sabine Rieger (East Germany) Ingrid Auerswald (East Germany) Marlies Göhr	Canberra (AUS)	October 6, 1985
Olympic record	41.60	(East Germany) Romy Müller (East Germany) Bärbel Wöckel (East Germany) Ingrid Auerswald (East Germany) Marlies Göhr	Moscow (URS)	August 1, 1980

== Final ==
- Held on Saturday 1988-10-01

RANK	NATION	ATHLETES	TIME
	United States	• Alice Brown • Sheila Echols • Florence Griffith Joyner • Evelyn Ashford	41.98
	East Germany	• Silke Möller • Kerstin Behrendt • Ingrid Lange • Marlies Göhr	42.09
	Soviet Union	• Lyudmila Kondratyeva • Galina Malchugina • Marina Zhirova • Natalya Pomoshchnikova	42.75
4.	West Germany	• Sabine Richter • Ulrike Sarvari • Andrea Thomas • Ute Thimm	42.76
5.	Bulgaria	• Zvetanka Ilieva • Valia Demireva • Nadeyda Gueorguieva • Yordanka Donkova	43.02
6.	Poland	• Joanna Smolarek • Jolanta Janota • Ewa Pisiewicz • Agnieszka Siwek	43.93
7.	France	• Françoise Leroux • Muriel Leroy • Laurence Bily • Patricia Girard	44.02
—	Jamaica	• Ethlyn Tate • Grace Jackson • Juliet Cuthbert • Merlene Ottey	DNS

== Semifinals ==
- Heat 1

RANK	NATION	ATHLETES	TIME
1.	Soviet Union	• Lyudmila Kondratyeva • Galina Malchugina • Marina Zhirova • Natalya Pomoshchnikova	42.01
2.	East Germany	• Silke Möller • Kerstin Behrendt • Ingrid Lange • Marlies Göhr	42.23
3.	Jamaica	• Ethlyn Tate • Grace Jackson • Juliet Cuthbert • Merlene Ottey	43.30
4.	Poland	• Joanna Smolarek • Jolanta Janota • Ewa Pisiewicz • Agnieszka Siwek	43.44
5.	Netherlands	• Nelli Fiere-Cooman • Marjan Olyslager • Gretha Tromp • Els Vader	43.48
6.	Great Britain	• Sallyanne Short • Bev Kinch • Simmone Jacobs • Paula Dunn	43.50
7.	Italy	• Anna Rita Angotzi • Rosella Tarolo • Daniela Ferrian • Marisa Masullo	43.97
8.	Greece	• Maria Tsoni • Maria Tsoni • Katerina Koffa • Marina Skordi	45.74

- Heat 2

RANK	NATION	ATHLETES	TIME
1.	United States	• Alice Brown • Sheila Echols • Florence Griffith Joyner • Evelyn Ashford	42.12
2.	West Germany	• Sabine Richter • Ulrike Sarvari • Andrea Thomas • Ute Thimm	42.69
3.	Bulgaria	• Zvetanka Ilieva • Valia Demireva • Nadeyda Gueorguieva • Yordanka Donkova	43.07
4.	France	• Françoise Leroux • Muriel Leroy • Laurence Bily • Patricia Girard	43.66
5.	Canada	• Angela Bailey • Angela Phipps • Angella Taylor-Issajenko • Katie Anderson	43.82
6.	Ghana	• Veronica Bawuah • Diana Yankey • Mercy Addy • Martha Appiah	44.30
7.	China	• Zhang Xiaoqiong • Liu Shaomei • Xie Zhiling • Zhang Caihua	44.36
—	Colombia	• Amparo Caicedo • Norfalia Carabalí • Olga Escalante • Ximena Restrepo	DNS

== Heats ==
- Heat 1

RANK	NATION	ATHLETES	TIME
1.	Soviet Union	• Maia Azarashvili • Galina Malchugina • Marina Zhirova • Natalya Pomoshchnikova	42.88
2.	West Germany	• Sabine Richter • Ulrike Sarvari • Andrea Thomas • Ute Thimm	42.99
3.	France	• Françoise Leroux • Muriel Leroy • Laurence Bily • Marie-Christine Cazier-Ballo	43.43
4.	Bulgaria	• Tsvetanka Ilieva • Valya Valova-Demireva • Nadezhda Georgieva • Yordanka Donkova	43.92
5.	Colombia	• Amparo Caicedo • Norfalia Carabalí • Olga Escalante • Ximena Restrepo	45.46
6.	Chinese Taipei	• Chang Feng-hua • Chen Wen-xing • Chen Ya-li • Wang Shu-hua	46.21

- Heat 2

RANK	NATION	ATHLETES	TIME
1.	East Germany	• Silke Möller • Kerstin Behrendt • Ingrid Lange • Marlies Göhr	42.92
2.	Jamaica	• Ethlyn Tate • Grace Jackson • Laurel Johnson • Vivienne Spence	43.50
3.	Canada	• Angela Bailey • Angela Phipps • Angella Taylor-Issajenko • Katie Anderson	43.92
4.	China	• Zhang Xiaoqiong • Liu Shaomei • Xie Zhiling • Zhang Caihua	44.29
5.	Italy	• Anna Rita Angotzi • Rosella Tarolo • Daniela Ferrian • Marisa Masullo	44.33
6.	Greece	• Maria Tsoni • Voula Patoulidou • Georgia Zouganeli • Marina Skordi	45.44
7.	South Korea	• Yun Mi-gyeong • U Yang-ja • Park Mi-seon • Lee Young-sook	45.83

- Heat 3

RANK	NATION	ATHLETES	TIME
1.	United States	• Alice Brown • Sheila Echols • Dannette Young • Evelyn Ashford	42.39
2.	Great Britain	• Sallyanne Short • Bev Kinch • Simmone Jacobs • Paula Dunn	43.91
3.	Netherlands	• Nelli Fiere-Cooman • Marjan Olyslager • Gretha Tromp • Els Vader	43.96
4.	Poland	• Joanna Smolarek • Jolanta Janota • Ewa Pisiewicz • Agnieszka Siwek	43.98
5.	Ghana	• Veronica Bawuah • Diana Yankey • Mercy Addy • Martha Appiah	44.12
6.	Uganda	• Oliver Acii • Grace Buzu • Farida Kyakutewa • Ruth Kyalisima	46.55

== See also ==
- 1986 Women's European Championships 4 × 100 m Relay (Stuttgart)
- 1987 Women's World Championships 4 × 100 m Relay (Rome)
- 1990 Women's European Championships 4 × 100 m Relay (Split)
- 1991 Women's World Championships 4 × 100 m Relay (Tokyo)
