= Athletics at the 1988 Summer Olympics – Women's 200 metres =

Women's 200 metres at the Games of the XXIV Olympiad
- Venue: Olympic Stadium
- Date: 28 September 1988 (heats, quarter-finals); 29 September 1988 (semi-final, final)
- Competitors: 59 from 43 nations
- Winning time: 21.34 WR

Medalists
1st place, gold medalist(s)		Florence Griffith-Joyner; United States
2nd place, silver medalist(s)		Grace Jackson; Jamaica
3rd place, bronze medalist(s)		Heike Drechsler; East Germany

Official Video Highlights

The Women's 200 metres at the 1988 Summer Olympics in Seoul, South Korea had an entry list of 60 competitors, with eight qualifying heats (60), four second-round races (32) and two semi-finals (16), before the final (8) took off on Thursday September 29, 1988.

The winning margin was 0.38 seconds which as of 2023 remains the only time the women's Olympic 200 metres has been won by more than 0.3 seconds since the introduction of fully automatic timing.

At the 1988 Olympic Trials, her 21.77 American record already showed Florence Griffith-Joyner was going to be a contender against the East Germans who had dominated the sprints for the previous decade. Marita Koch had retired but her equal Heike Drechsler was here. In the quarter-final round, Griffith-Joyner improved to 21.76, but then she had set the world record in the 100 metres. The semi-finals the following day showed she had more, her 21.56 was a .15 improvement on the world record. More than a quarter century later, the time still stands as the second fastest 200 metres ever run by a woman. The final was more impressive, Griffith-Joyner gradually making up the stagger on Grace Jackson to her outside and Merlene Ottey running about equal through the turn. From there she simply pulled away from the best in the world. The tall Jackson was able to separate from her Jamaican teammate but was still three long steps behind Griffith-Joyner. Inhibited by the tight turn of lane 1, Drechsler made a late rush on the inside to catch Ottey for bronze.

21.34 knocked another .22 off her world record from earlier in the day (.37 taken from the world record on one day). The time has never been approached since. Jackson, in second place in this race missed the previous world record by .01 and did not look in contention. Five women have since surpassed Koch and Drechsler's world record, including fourth place Ottey twice.

== Medalists ==
Gold	Florence Griffith-Joyner; United States
Silver	Grace Jackson; Jamaica
Bronze	Heike Drechsler; East Germany

== Records ==
These were the standing world and Olympic records (in seconds) prior to the 1988 Summer Olympics.

World record	21.71	(East Germany) Marita Koch	Karl-Marx-Stadt (GDR)	June 10, 1979
Olympic record	21.81	(United States) Valerie Brisco-Hooks	Los Angeles (USA)	August 9, 1984

The following World and Olympic records were set during this competition.

Date	Event	Athlete	Time	OR	WR
September 28, 1988	Quarterfinal	Florence Griffith-Joyner (USA)	21.76 s	OR	
September 29, 1988	Semifinal	Florence Griffith-Joyner (USA)	21.56 s	OR	WR
September 29, 1988	Final	Florence Griffith-Joyner (USA)	21.34 s	OR	WR

== Results ==
=== Heats ===
First 3 from each heat (Q) and the next 8 fastest (q) qualified for the quarterfinals.

Rank	Heat	Name	Nationality	Time	Notes
1	5	Florence Griffith-Joyner	United States	22.51	Q
2	6	Grace Jackson	Jamaica	22.66	Q
3	2	Nadezhda Georgieva	Bulgaria	22.80	Q
4	2	Mary Onyali	Nigeria	22.82	Q
5	3	Galina Malchugina	Soviet Union	22.85	Q
6	7	Gwen Torrence	United States	22.87	Q
7	2	Andrea Thomas	West Germany	22.92	Q
8	1	Heike Drechsler	East Germany	22.93	Q
9	6	Maya Azarachvili	Soviet Union	22.98	Q
10	4	Merlene Ottey	Jamaica	23.06	Q
11	3	Silke Möller	East Germany	23.07	Q
12	7	Pauline Davis	Bahamas	23.08	Q
13	1	Agnieszka Siwek	Poland	23.10	Q
14	1	Falilat Ogunkoya	Nigeria	23.12	Q
15	5	Katrin Krabbe	East Germany	23.14	Q
16	5	Muriel Leroy	France	23.19	Q
17	7	Kerry Johnson	Australia	23.20	Q
18	5	Regula Aebi	Switzerland	23.22	q
19	8	Paula Dunn	Great Britain	23.32	Q
20	3	Jolanta Janota	Poland	23.40	Q
21	7	Simmone Jacobs	Great Britain	23.47	q
22	4	Marie-José Pérec	France	23.49	Q
23	7	Marie-Christine Cazier-Ballo	France	23.50	q
24	4	Silke Knoll	West Germany	23.51	Q
25	3	Jocelyn Joseph	Antigua and Barbuda	23.57	q
26	3	Marisa Masullo	Italy	23.58	q
27	2	Rita Angotzi	Italy	23.59	q
28	4	Louise Stuart	Great Britain	23.61	q
29	8	Maria Magnólia Figueiredo	Brazil	23.71	Q
30	1	Angela Williams	Trinidad and Tobago	23.76	q
31	6	Norfalia Carabalí	Colombia	23.78	Q
32	6	Yolande Straughn	Barbados	23.81	
33	8	Karin Janke	West Germany	23.83	Q
34	1	Ximena Restrepo	Colombia	24.00	
35	8	Xie Zhiling	China	24.01	
36	2	Marina Skordi	Greece	24.06	
37	5	Zhang Xiaoqiong	China	24.08	
38	4	Joyce Odhiambo	Kenya	24.26	
39	4	Oliver Acii	Uganda	24.39	
40	6	Gaily Dube	Zimbabwe	24.42	
41	7	Claudia Acerenza	Uruguay	24.46	
42	2	Ruth Morris	Virgin Islands	24.51	
43	2	Agnes Griffith	Grenada	24.79	
44	6	Yvonne Hasler	Liechtenstein	24.91	
45	3	U Yang-ja	South Korea	24.94	
46	5	Ivette Bonapart	Suriname	24.95	
47	7	Chen Ya-Li	Chinese Taipei	25.03	
48	4	Judith Diankolela-Missengui	Republic of the Congo	25.20	
49	2	Ng Ka Yi	Hong Kong	25.35	
50	1	Felicite Bada	Benin	25.42	
51	3	Melvina Wulah	Liberia	25.46	
52	5	Guilhermina da Cruz	Angola	25.62	
53	4	Evelyn Farrell	Aruba	25.74	
54	6	Aminata Diarra	Mali	25.81	
55	1	Mariama Ouiminga	Burkina Faso	26.08	
56	3	Erin Tierney	Cook Islands	26.16	
57	8	Olivette Daruhi	Vanuatu	26.88	
58	8	Rosa Mbuamangongo	Equatorial Guinea	31.12	
	8	Pamela Marshall	United States	DNF	
	6	Maree Holland	Australia	DNS	

=== Quarterfinals ===
First 4 from each heat qualified directly (Q) for the semifinals.

Rank	Heat	Name	Nationality	Time	Notes
1	1	Florence Griffith-Joyner	United States	21.76	Q
2	3	Grace Jackson	Jamaica	22.24	Q
3	2	Gwen Torrence	United States	22.25	Q
4	2	Merlene Ottey	Jamaica	22.30	Q
5	1	Maya Azarachvili	Soviet Union	22.37	Q
6	1	Heike Drechsler	East Germany	22.38	Q
7	2	Nadezhda Georgieva	Bulgaria	22.60	Q
8	2	Katrin Krabbe	East Germany	22.67	Q
9	4	Galina Malchugina	Soviet Union	22.77	Q
10	3	Andrea Thomas	West Germany	22.84	Q
11	3	Silke Möller	East Germany	22.86	Q
12	1	Regula Aebi	Switzerland	22.88	Q
12	2	Falilat Ogunkoya	Nigeria	22.88	
14	4	Mary Onyali	Nigeria	22.89	Q
15	4	Pauline Davis	Bahamas	22.92	Q
16	4	Agnieszka Siwek	Poland	22.96	Q
17	1	Kerry Johnson	Australia	23.01	
18	3	Paula Dunn	Great Britain	23.04	Q
19	1	Silke Knoll	West Germany	23.15	
20	3	Muriel Leroy	France	23.22	
21	2	Rita Angotzi	Italy	23.33	
22	2	Jolanta Janota	Poland	23.34	
23	4	Simmone Jacobs	Great Britain	23.38	
24	1	Angela Williams	Trinidad and Tobago	23.48	
25	3	Marisa Masullo	Italy	23.52	
26	2	Louise Stuart	Great Britain	23.59	
26	3	Jocelyn Joseph	Antigua and Barbuda	23.59	
28	1	Marie-Christine Cazier-Ballo	France	23.63	
29	4	Maria Magnólia Figueiredo	Brazil	23.67	
30	4	Karin Janke	West Germany	23.87	
31	3	Norfalia Carabalí	Colombia	23.96	
32	4	Marie-José Pérec	France	24.22	

=== Semi finals ===
RANK	HEAT 1	TIME
1.	Florence Griffith-Joyner (USA)	21.56(WR)
2.	Merlene Ottey (JAM)	22.07
3.	Silke Möller (GDR)	22.15
4.	Maya Azarachvili (URS)	22.33
5.	Mary Onyali (NGR)	22.43
6.	Katrin Krabbe (GDR)	22.59
7.	Pauline Davis (BAH)	22.67
8.	Andrea Thomas (FRG)	22.91

RANK	HEAT 2	TIME
1.	Grace Jackson (JAM)	22.13
2.	Heike Drechsler (GDR)	22.27
3.	Gwen Torrence (USA)	22.53
4.	Galina Malchugina (URS)	22.55
5.	Nadezhda Georgieva (BUL)	22.67
6.	Paula Dunn (GBR)	23.14
7.	Agnieszka Siwek (POL)	23.20
8.	Regula Aebi (SUI)	23.33

=== Final ===
RANK	FINAL	TIME
	Florence Griffith-Joyner (USA)	21.34 (WR)
	Grace Jackson (JAM)	21.72
	Heike Drechsler (GDR)	21.95
4.	Merlene Ottey (JAM)	21.99
5.	Silke Möller (GDR)	22.09
6.	Gwen Torrence (USA)	22.17
7.	Maya Azarachvili (URS)	22.33
8.	Galina Malchugina (URS)	22.42

== See also ==
- 1984 Women's Olympic 200 metres (Los Angeles)
- 1986 Women's European Championships 200 metres (Stuttgart)
- 1987 Women's World Championships 200 metres (Rome)
- 1990 Women's European Championships 200 metres (Split)
- 1991 Women's World Championships 200 metres (Tokyo)
- 1992 Women's Olympic 200 metres (Barcelona)
