= Athletics at the 1990 Commonwealth Games – Women's 200 metres =

Women's 200 metres at the Commonwealth Games

The women's 200 metres event at the 1990 Commonwealth Games was held on 29 January and 1 February at the Mount Smart Stadium in Auckland.

== Medalists ==
Gold	Silver	Bronze
Merlene Ottey; Jamaica	Kerry Johnson; Australia	Pauline Davis; Bahamas

== Results ==
=== Heats ===
Qualification: First 2 of each heat (Q) and the next 3 fastest (q) qualified for the final.

Wind:
Heat 1: +2.6 m/s, Heat 2: +3.2 m/s, Heat 3: +5.3 m/s

Rank	Heat	Name	Nationality	Time	Notes
1	3	Kerry Johnson	Australia	22.75	Q
2	1	Merlene Ottey	Jamaica	22.87	Q
3	3	Jenni Stoute	England	23.09	Q
4	2	Sallyanne Short	Wales	23.19	Q
5	2	Pauline Davis	Bahamas	23.33	Q
6	2	Kathy Sambell	Australia	23.52	q
7	2	Linda Keough	England	23.55	q
8	1	Paula Dunn	England	23.58	Q
9	3	Oliver Acii	Uganda	23.72	q
10	3	Mercy Addy	Ghana	23.77	
11	2	Michelle Seymour	New Zealand	23.83	
12	1	Briar Toop	New Zealand	23.89	
13	2	Stacy Bowen	Canada	24.16	
14	3	France Gareau	Canada	24.20	
15	2	Janis Neilson	Scotland	24.23	
16	1	Elizabeth Onyambu	Kenya	24.34	
17	3	Ng Ka Yi	Hong Kong	25.13	
18	1	Kinah Chikontwe	Zambia	25.75	
19	1	Erin Tierney	Cook Islands	26.06	
	1	Esmie Lawrence	Canada	DNS	

=== Final ===
Wind: +2.0 m/s

Rank	Lane	Name	Nationality	Time	Notes
1st place, gold medalist(s)	3	Merlene Ottey	Jamaica	22.76	
2nd place, silver medalist(s)	6	Kerry Johnson	Australia	22.88	
3rd place, bronze medalist(s)	8	Pauline Davis	Bahamas	23.15	
4	4	Jenni Stoute	England	23.16	
5	9	Paula Dunn	England	23.33	
6	5	Sallyanne Short	Wales	23.35	
7	7	Kathy Sambell	Australia	23.56	
8	2	Linda Keough	England	23.66	
9	1	Oliver Acii	Uganda	24.14	
