= Athletics at the 1990 Commonwealth Games – Women's 100 metres =

Sport

Women's 100 metres at the Commonwealth Games

The women's 100 metres event at the 1990 Commonwealth Games was held on 27 and 28 January at the Mount Smart Stadium in Auckland.

== Medalists ==
Gold	Silver	Bronze
Merlene Ottey; Jamaica	Kerry Johnson; Australia	Pauline Davis; Bahamas

== Results ==
=== Heats ===
Qualification: First 5 of each heat (Q) and the next 3 fastest (q) qualified for the semifinals.

Wind:
Heat 1: +3.3 m/s, Heat 2: -0.3 m/s, Heat 3: +0.8 m/s

Rank	Heat	Name	Nationality	Time	Notes
1	1	Merlene Ottey	Jamaica	11.07	Q
2	2	Kerry Johnson	Australia	11.25	Q
3	2	Pauline Davis	Bahamas	11.44	Q
4	1	Simmone Jacobs	England	11.45	Q
5	2	Stephi Douglas	England	11.46	Q
6	2	Sallyanne Short	Wales	11.47	Q, NR
7	1	Briar Toop	New Zealand	11.51	Q
8	2	Michelle Seymour	New Zealand	11.69	Q
9	2	Oliver Acii	Uganda	11.76	q
9	3	Paula Dunn	England	11.76	Q
11	2	Nadine Halliday	Canada	11.77	q
12	3	Helen Pirovano	New Zealand	11.78	Q
13	3	Carmen Smart	Wales	11.91	Q
14	2	Michelle Freeman	Jamaica	11.93	q
15	1	Esmie Lawrence	Canada	11.97	Q
16	3	France Gareau	Canada	12.03	Q
17	3	Janis Neilson	Scotland	12.11	Q
18	3	Judith Robinson	Northern Ireland	12.24	
19	1	Elizabeth Onyambu	Kenya	12.29	Q
20	1	Kinah Chikontwe	Zambia	12.39	
21	3	Ng Ka Yi	Hong Kong	12.45	
22	1	Erin Tierney	Cook Islands	12.67	

=== Semifinals ===
Qualification: First 4 of each heat (Q) and the next 1 fastest (q) qualified for the final.

Wind:
Heat 1: +1.6 m/s, Heat 2: +1.6 m/s

Rank	Heat	Name	Nationality	Time	Notes
1	2	Kerry Johnson	Australia	11.19	Q, AR
2	1	Merlene Ottey	Jamaica	11.20	Q
3	2	Pauline Davis	Bahamas	11.35	Q
4	1	Sallyanne Short	Wales	11.47	Q, =NR
5	2	Stephi Douglas	England	11.53	Q
6	1	Simmone Jacobs	England	11.54	Q
7	2	Briar Toop	New Zealand	11.55	Q
8	1	Paula Dunn	England	11.57	Q
9	2	Oliver Acii	Uganda	11.64	q
10	2	Carmen Smart	Wales	11.66	
11	1	Michelle Seymour	New Zealand	11.69	
12	1	Helen Pirovano	New Zealand	11.72	
13	1	Janis Neilson	Scotland	11.83	
14	2	Nadine Halliday	Canada	11.88	
15	1	France Gareau	Canada	12.01	
16	1	Esmie Lawrence	Canada	12.02	
17	2	Elizabeth Onyambu	Kenya	12.34	
	2	Michelle Freeman	Jamaica	DNS	

=== Final ===
Wind: +4.4 m/s

Rank	Lane	Name	Nationality	Time	Notes
1st place, gold medalist(s)	4	Merlene Ottey	Jamaica	11.02	
2nd place, silver medalist(s)	5	Kerry Johnson	Australia	11.17	
3rd place, bronze medalist(s)	3	Pauline Davis	Bahamas	11.20	
4	9	Stephi Douglas	England	11.39	
5	6	Sallyanne Short	Wales	11.41	
6	7	Briar Toop	New Zealand	11.46	
7	8	Simmone Jacobs	England	11.53	
8	2	Paula Dunn	England	11.55	
9	1	Oliver Acii	Uganda	11.65	
