= Athletics at the 1989 Jeux de la Francophonie – Results =

These are the full results of the athletics competition at the 1989 Jeux de la Francophonie which took place on 12–17 July 1989, in Casablanca, Morocco.

== Men's results ==
=== 100 meters ===
Heats – 13 July

Rank	Heat	Name	Nationality	Time	Notes
1?	2	Daniel Sangouma	France	10.20	+1.3
?	?	Brian Morrison	Canada	10.39	

Semifinals – 14 July
Wind:
Heat 1: +0.3 m/s, Heat 1: +2.2 m/s

Rank	Heat	Name	Nationality	Time	Notes
1	1	Bruny Surin	Quebec	10.25	Q
2	1	Daniel Sangouma	France	10.26	Q
3	1	Max Morinière	France	10.33	Q
4	1	Brian Morrison	Canada	10.46	Q
1	2	Bruno Marie-Rose	France	10.22	Q
2	2	Amadou M'Baye	Senegal	10.25	Q
3	2	Mike Dwyer	Canada	10.49	Q
4	2	Anthony Small	Canada	10.51	Q

Final – 14 July
Wind: +1.9 m/s

Rank	Name	Nationality	Time	Notes
1st place, gold medalist(s)	Daniel Sangouma	France	10.17	
2nd place, silver medalist(s)	Bruno Marie-Rose	France	10.18	
3rd place, bronze medalist(s)	Max Morinière	France	10.29	
4	Bruny Surin	Quebec	10.31	
5	Amadou M'Baye	Senegal	10.32	
6	Brian Morrison	Canada	10.45	
7	Anthony Small	Canada	10.61	
8	Mike Dwyer	Canada	10.83	

=== 200 meters ===
Final – 18 July
Wind: +1.1 m/s

Rank	Name	Nationality	Time	Notes
1st place, gold medalist(s)	Daniel Sangouma	France	20.20	
2nd place, silver medalist(s)	Bruno Marie-Rose	France	20.58	
3rd place, bronze medalist(s)	Jean-Charles Trouabal	France	20.71	
4	Gilles Bogui	Ivory Coast	21.22	
5	Anthony Small	Canada	21.28	
6	Clarke	Quebec	21.62	
7	Mike Dwyer	Canada	21.86	
	Ouattara Lagazane	Ivory Coast	DNS	

=== 400 meters ===
Semifinals

Rank	Name	Nationality	Time	Notes
?	Olivier Noirot	France	46.19	
?	John Graham	Canada	46.50	

Final – 16 July

Rank	Name	Nationality	Time	Notes
1st place, gold medalist(s)	Gabriel Tiacoh	Ivory Coast	44.93	
2nd place, silver medalist(s)	Anton Skerritt	Canada	46.10	
3rd place, bronze medalist(s)	Hachim Ndiaye	Senegal	46.28	
4	Jacques Farraudière	France	46.39	
5	Jean-Claude Lauret	France	46.42	
6	Abdelali Kasbane	Morocco	46.80	
7	John Graham	Canada	46.96	
	Olivier Noirot	France	DNS	

=== 800 meters ===
Heats

Rank	Name	Nationality	Time	Notes
?	Frédéric Cornette	France	1:48.79	

Semifinals

Rank	Name	Nationality	Time	Notes
?	Alex Vetillard	France	1:49.12	

Final – 14 July

Rank	Name	Nationality	Time	Notes
1st place, gold medalist(s)	Moussa Fall	Senegal	1:46.78	
2nd place, silver medalist(s)	Faouzi Lahbi	Morocco	1:47.08	
3rd place, bronze medalist(s)	Babacar Niang	Senegal	1:47.18	
4	Charles Nkazamyampi	Burundi	1:47.90	
5	Patrick Pierre Ellies	France	1:48.33	
6	Cheikh Tidiane Boye	Senegal	1:48.96	
7	Mike Birke	Canada	1:49.75	
8	William Best	New Brunswick	1:52.74	

=== 1500 meters ===
Heats

Rank	Name	Nationality	Time	Notes
?	Emmanuel Goulin	France	3:48.25	
?	Philippe Fargere	France	3:51.26	

Final – 18 July

Rank	Name	Nationality	Time	Notes
1st place, gold medalist(s)	Hassan Ouhrouch	Morocco	3:40.25	
2nd place, silver medalist(s)	Éric Dubus	France	3:40.54	
3rd place, bronze medalist(s)	Mustapha Lachaal	Morocco	3:40.58	
4	Mahmoud Kalboussi	Tunisia	3:40.89	
5	Rachid El Basir	Morocco	3:40.89	
6	Eulucane Ndagijimana	Rwanda	3:45.40	
7	Dave Campbell	Canada	3:47.40	
8	Simon Hoogewerf	Canada	3:49.21	
9	Emmanuel Goulin	France	3:55.73	
10	Henry Klassen	Canada	4:03.06	
	Philippe Fargere	France	DNS	

=== 5000 meters ===
14 July

Rank	Name	Nationality	Time	Notes
1st place, gold medalist(s)	Saïd Aouita	Morocco	13:36.19	
2nd place, silver medalist(s)	Khalid Skah	Morocco	13:39.01	
3rd place, bronze medalist(s)	Mohamed Issangar	Morocco	13:47.89	
4	Bruno Levant	France	13:50.95	
5	Paul Williams	Canada	13:52.07	
6	Antonio Rapisarda	France	13:52.15	
7	Jean-Pierre N'Dayisenga	Belgium	13:58.87	
8	Diomede Cishahayo	Burundi	14:13.44	

=== 10,000 meters ===
18 July

Rank	Name	Nationality	Time	Notes
1st place, gold medalist(s)	Brahim Boutayeb	Morocco	28:53.11	
2nd place, silver medalist(s)	Hammou Boutayeb	Morocco	28:55.61	
3rd place, bronze medalist(s)	Jean-Louis Prianon	France	29:20.00	
4	Didier Chauvellier	France	29:33.74	
5	Habib Romdhani	Tunisia	29:36.68	
6	Mohammed Mourhit	Morocco	29:37.55	
7	Ali Ismael Hassan	Djibouti	29:57.65	
8	Abderrazak Gtari	Tunisia	30:05.70	
9	Serge Nshinyabigoye	Burundi	30:17.84	
10	François Barreau	France	30:22.97	

=== Marathon ===
18 July

Rank	Name	Nationality	Time	Notes
1st place, gold medalist(s)	Youssouf Doukal	Djibouti	2:19:18	
2nd place, silver medalist(s)	Abdi Doudoub	Djibouti	2:23:10	
3rd place, bronze medalist(s)	Mohamed Abdi	Djibouti	2:25:54	
4	Michel Constant	France	2:27:41	
5	Saley	Niger	2:30:56	
6	Abdou Manzo	Niger	2:32:00	
7	Ghanmi	Morocco	2:33:38	
8	Dorys Langlois	Quebec	2:36:30	

=== 110 meters hurdles ===
Heats

Rank	Heat	Name	Nationality	Time	Notes
?	?	Pascal Boussemart	France	14.01	

Final – 14 July
Wind: +0.7 m/s

Rank	Name	Nationality	Time	Notes
1st place, gold medalist(s)	Philippe Aubert	France	13.84	
2nd place, silver medalist(s)	Vincent Clarico	France	13.96	
3rd place, bronze medalist(s)	Judex Lefou	Mauritius	14.06	
4	Pascal Boussemart	France	14.08	
5	Michel Brodeur	Quebec	14.28	
6	Zouhair Khazine	Morocco	14.36	
7	Marcelin Dally	Ivory Coast	14.60	
8	Moussa Sagna Fall	Senegal	14.66	

=== 400 meters hurdles ===
Heats

Rank	Heat	Name	Nationality	Time	Notes
3	?	Philippe Gonigam	France	51.50	
6	?	Pascal Maran	France	51.98	

Final – 18 July

Rank	Name	Nationality	Time	Notes
1st place, gold medalist(s)	Amadou Dia Ba	Senegal	49.47	
2nd place, silver medalist(s)	Philippe Gonigam	France	49.89	
3rd place, bronze medalist(s)	John Graham	Canada	50.12	
4	Said Aberkan	Canada	50.36	
5	Marc Dollendorf	Belgium	50.41	
6	Ahmed Abdelhalim Ghanem	Egypt	50.47	
7	Michel Zimmermann	Belgium	51.07	
8	Hamidou M'Baye	Senegal	51.65	

=== 3000 meters steeplechase ===
14 July

Rank	Name	Nationality	Time	Notes
1st place, gold medalist(s)	Graeme Fell	Canada	8:27.91	
2nd place, silver medalist(s)	Bruno Le Stum	France	8:29.82	
3rd place, bronze medalist(s)	Joseph Mahmoud	France	8:30.60	
4	Elarbi Khattabi	Morocco	8:30.87	
5	Hassan Ouhrouch	Morocco	8:31.80	
6	Mustapha Bejdaoui	Morocco	8:37.68	
7	Astere Havugiyaremye	Burundi	8:52.50	
8	Alain Boucher	Canada	8:55.30	

=== 4 × 100 meters relay ===
18 July

Rank	Nation	Competitors	Time	Notes
1st place, gold medalist(s)	France	Max Morinière, Daniel Sangouma, Jean-Charles Trouabal, Bruno Marie-Rose	38.75	
2nd place, silver medalist(s)	Canada	Everton Anderson, Mike Dwyer, Anton Skerritt, Brian Morrison	40.07	
3rd place, bronze medalist(s)	Ivory Coast		40.31	
4	Quebec		40.71	
5	Burkina Faso		41.19	
6	Morocco		41.44	
7	Central African Republic		42.61	
	Senegal		DNS	

=== 4 × 400 meters relay ===
18 July

Rank	Nation	Competitors	Time	Notes
1st place, gold medalist(s)	Senegal	Ibou Faye, Babacar Niang, Moussa Fall, Hachim Ndiaye	3:04.69	
2nd place, silver medalist(s)	France	Emmanuel Esdras, Pascal Maran, Jacques Farraudière, Philippe Gonigam	3:06.24	
3rd place, bronze medalist(s)	Canada	Brian Dicker, Ian Newhouse, John Graham, Anton Skerritt	3:06.93	
4	Morocco		3:07.39	
5	Burundi		3:08.72	
6	Mauritius		3:09.41	
7	Quebec		3:14.49	

=== 20 kilometers walk ===
13 July

Rank	Name	Nationality	Time	Notes
1st place, gold medalist(s)	Guillaume LeBlanc	Canada	1:27:27	
2nd place, silver medalist(s)	Jean-Claude Corre	France	1:28:39	
3rd place, bronze medalist(s)	Thierry Toutain	France	1:35:08	
4	René Piller	France	1:35:27	
5	Mustapha Boulal	Morocco	1:35:39	
6	Philippe Gauthier	Quebec	1:40:24	
7	Daoust	Canada	1:43:51	
8	Martin Archambault	Quebec	1:45:38	

=== High jump ===
16 July

Rank	Name	Nationality	Result	Notes
1st place, gold medalist(s)	Jean-Charles Gicquel	France	2.22	
2nd place, silver medalist(s)	Joël Vincent	France	2.19	
3rd place, bronze medalist(s)	Dominique Hernandez	France	2.19	
4	Boubacar Guèye	Senegal	2.15	
5	Alain Metellus	Quebec	2.15	
6	Emanuel Ngadjadoum	Chad	2.10	
7	Jean-Claude Silao	Congo	2.10	
8	Hilaire Onwanlélé-Ozimo	Gabon	2.10	
9	Patrick Renaud	Quebec	2.05	

=== Pole vault ===
17 July

Rank	Name	Nationality	Result	Notes
1st place, gold medalist(s)	Ferenc Salbert	France	5.65	
2nd place, silver medalist(s)	Jean-Marc Tailhardat	France	5.50	
3rd place, bronze medalist(s)	Philippe d'Encausse	France	5.35	
4	Doug Wood	Canada	5.35	
5	Paul Just	Canada	5.00	
	Antoine Daudelin	Quebec	NM	
	Stuart Love	Canada	NM	

=== Long jump ===
13 July

Rank	Name	Nationality	Result	Notes
1st place, gold medalist(s)	Edrick Floréal	Canada	7.84	
2nd place, silver medalist(s)	Glenroy Gilbert	Canada	7.79	
3rd place, bronze medalist(s)	Norbert Brige	France	7.75	
4	Jean-Louis Rapnouil	France	7.70	
5	Badara Mbengue	Senegal	7.63	
6	Yves Bertrand	France	7.49	
7	Cheikh Touré	Senegal	7.48	
8	Frédéric Ebong-Salle	Cameroon	7.40	

=== Triple jump ===
18 July

Rank	Name	Nationality	Result	Notes
1st place, gold medalist(s)	Toussaint Rabenala	Madagascar	16.97	
2nd place, silver medalist(s)	Pierre Camara	France	16.87	
3rd place, bronze medalist(s)	Edrick Floréal	Canada	16.69	
4	Serge Hélan	France	16.49	
5	Paul Nioze	Seychelles	16.32	
6	Didier Falise	Belgium	16.18	
7	George Wright	Canada	16.11	
8	Oral Ogilvie	Canada	15.81	

=== Shot put ===
13 July

Rank	Name	Nationality	Result	Notes
1st place, gold medalist(s)	Luc Viudès	France	19.11	
2nd place, silver medalist(s)	Patrick Journoud	France	17.64	
3rd place, bronze medalist(s)	Lorne Hilton	Canada	17.55	
4	Rob Venier	Canada	17.21	
5	Aubert Treguilly	France	17.00	
6	Mohamed Fatihi	Morocco	16.88	
7	Kevin Pommer	Canada	16.42	
8	Khalid Fatihi	Morocco	15.30	

=== Discus throw ===
18 July

Rank	Name	Nationality	Result	Notes
1st place, gold medalist(s)	Patrick Journoud	France	58.76	
2nd place, silver medalist(s)	Ray Lazdins	Canada	56.14	
3rd place, bronze medalist(s)	Sandor Katona	France	52.36	
4	Robert McManus	Canada	51.34	
5	Youssef Souiba	Morocco	47.62	
6	Aubert Treguilly	France	47.54	
7	Pierre Ndongo	Cameroon	46.50	
8	Mohamed Fatihi	Morocco	46.48	

=== Hammer throw ===
17 July

Rank	Name	Nationality	Result	Notes
1st place, gold medalist(s)	Raphaël Piolanti	France	73.16	
2nd place, silver medalist(s)	Walter Ciofani	France	72.18	
3rd place, bronze medalist(s)	Frédéric Kuhn	France	72.12	
4	Hassan Chahine	Morocco	65.32	
5	Sherif Farouk El Hennawi	Egypt	65.32	
6	Darren McFee	Canada	58.94	
7	Abdellah Chahine	Morocco	56.06	
8	Didier Bosquet	Mauritius	51.44	

=== Javelin throw ===
14 July

Rank	Name	Nationality	Result	Notes
1st place, gold medalist(s)	Jean-Paul Lakafia	France	73.38	
2nd place, silver medalist(s)	Pascal Lefèvre	France	72.80	
3rd place, bronze medalist(s)	Alain Storaci	France	70.04	
4	Mike Mahovlich	Canada	69.88	
5	Steve Feraday	Canada	68.84	
6	Peter Massfeller	Canada	64.74	
7	Jérôme Putzeys	Belgium	62.54	
8	Louis Brault	Quebec	62.52	

=== Decathlon ===
13–14 July

Rank	Athlete	Nationality	100m	LJ	SP	HJ	400m	110m H	DT	PV	JT	1500m	Points	Notes
1st place, gold medalist(s)	Mike Smith	Canada	11.03	7.39	14.10	2.04	48.42	14.68	44.44	4.40	62.76	4:24.58	8160	
2nd place, silver medalist(s)	Abdennacer Moumen	Morocco	11.28	6.76	13.47	2.10	50.21	15.42	37.02	3.80	52.02	4:20.53	7345	
3rd place, bronze medalist(s)	Richard Hesketh	Canada	11.11	6.81	12.60	1.95	49.69	15.44	36.26	4.20	52.06	4:21.84	7312	
4	Gareth Peet	Canada	11.43	6.85	12.93	1.89	50.17	14.89	37.48	4.10	55.20	4:24.02	7292	
5	Hassan Jaljalane	Morocco											6543	
6	Abdeljalil Smaq	Morocco											6365	
	Christian Mandrou	France											DNF	

== Women's results ==
=== 100 meters ===
Heats – 13 July

Rank	Heat	Name	Nationality	Time	Notes
?	?	Françoise Leroux	France	11.43	

Semifinal
Wind: +0.2 m/s

Rank	Heat	Name	Nationality	Time	Notes
?	?	Françoise Leroux	France	11.42	

Final – 14 July
Wind: +1.9 m/s

Rank	Name	Nationality	Time	Notes
1st place, gold medalist(s)	Laurence Bily	France	11.14	
2nd place, silver medalist(s)	Patricia Girard	France	11.25	
3rd place, bronze medalist(s)	Lalao Ravaonirina	Madagascar	11.35	
4	Esmie Lawrence	Canada	11.37	
5	Françoise Leroux	France	11.45	
6	Méryem Oumezdi	Morocco	11.55	
7	France Gareau	Canada	11.57	
8	Sandrine Hennart	Belgium	11.73	

=== 200 meters ===
Heats – 13 July

Rank	Heat	Name	Nationality	Time	Notes
?	?	Marie-José Pérec	France	22.80	+1.7

Final – 18 July
Wind: +0.9 m/s

Rank	Name	Nationality	Time	Notes
1st place, gold medalist(s)	Marie-José Pérec	France	22.60	
2nd place, silver medalist(s)	Lalao Ravaonirina	Madagascar	23.26	
3rd place, bronze medalist(s)	Odile Singa	France	23.47	
4	Jillian Richardson	Canada	23.51	
5	France Gareau	Canada	23.55	
6	Esmie Lawrence	Canada	23.68	
7	Carine Finck-Falise	Belgium	23.89	
8	Sylvia Dethier	Belgium	24.23	

=== 400 meters ===
Heats

Rank	Heat	Name	Nationality	Time	Notes
?	?	Juliette Mato	France	52.89	

Semifinals

Rank	Heat	Name	Nationality	Time	Notes
?	?	Évelyne Élien	France	52.88	
5	?	Ketty Régent-Talbot	France	54.18	

Final – 16 July

Rank	Name	Nationality	Time	Notes
1st place, gold medalist(s)	Jillian Richardson	Ivory Coast	51.79	
2nd place, silver medalist(s)	Charmaine Crooks	Canada	52.02	
3rd place, bronze medalist(s)	Néné Tandian	Senegal	52.08	
4	Célestine N'Drin	Ivory Coast	52.85	
5	Évelyne Élien	France	52.93	
6	Juliette Mato	France	53.57	
7	Ketty Régent-Talbot	France	53.71	
8	Karima Miskin Saad	Egypt	53.71	

=== 800 meters ===
Heats

Rank	Heat	Name	Nationality	Time	Notes
4	?	Nathalie Rèche	France	2:07.07	
5	?	Barbara Gourdet	France	2:07.16	

Final – 14 July

Rank	Name	Nationality	Time	Notes
1st place, gold medalist(s)	Brit Lind-Petersen	Canada	2:05.03	
2nd place, silver medalist(s)	Renée Belanger	Canada	2:05.24	
3rd place, bronze medalist(s)	Fatima Maama	Morocco	2:05.41	
4	Catherine Guerrero	France	2:05.91	
5	Harris	Canada	2:06.02	
6	Najat Ouali	Morocco	2:07.62	
7	Nathalie Rouillard	Quebec	2:08.50	
8	Lahmadi	Morocco	2:07.68	

=== 1500 meters ===
18 July

Rank	Name	Nationality	Time	Notes
1st place, gold medalist(s)	Fatima Aouam	Morocco	4:11.15	
2nd place, silver medalist(s)	Robyn Meagher	Canada	4:13.71	
3rd place, bronze medalist(s)	Paula Schnurr	Canada	4:16.12	
4	Fatima Maama	Morocco	4:18.08	
5	Claudie Boistel	France	4:19.19	
6	Annette Sergent	France	4:19.64	
7	Nathalie Loubele	Belgium	4:19.89	
8	François Garceau	Quebec	4:23.57	
9	Joëlle Franc	France	4:25.06	

=== 3000 meters ===
17 July

Rank	Name	Nationality	Time	Notes
1st place, gold medalist(s)	Fatima Aouam	Morocco	9:06.70	
2nd place, silver medalist(s)	Marcianne Mukamurenzi	Rwanda	9:10.71	
3rd place, bronze medalist(s)	Alison Wiley	Canada	9:10.76	
4	Odile Ohier	France	9:11.29	
5	Ulla Marquette	Canada	9:11.93	
6	Hassinia Darami	Morocco	9:14.43	
7	Farida Fatès	France	9:14.74	
8	Rosario Murcia	France	9:28.63	

=== 10,000 meters ===
18 July

Rank	Name	Nationality	Time	Notes
1st place, gold medalist(s)	Marcianne Mukamurenzi	Rwanda	34:18.84	
2nd place, silver medalist(s)	Hassinia Darami	Morocco	34:20.75	
3rd place, bronze medalist(s)	Odile Ohier	France	34:31.72	
4	Souad Nakour	Morocco	35:12.57	
5	Anne Vialix	France	35:44.63	
6	Dumont	Belgium	35:48.96	

=== Marathon ===
18 July

Rank	Name	Nationality	Time	Notes
1st place, gold medalist(s)	Rakiya Maraoui	Morocco	2:47:01	
2nd place, silver medalist(s)	Cindy New	Quebec	2:47:38	
3rd place, bronze medalist(s)	Maryse Justin	Mauritius	2:54:50	
4	Dominique Rembert	France	2:58:06	
5	Sylviane Geffray	France	2:58:06	
6	Eunice Phillips	New Brunswick	3:18:56	
7	Noeleen Wadden	Canada	3:18:56	
	Laura Konantz	Canada	DNF	

=== 100 meters hurdles ===
Heats

Rank	Name	Nationality	Time	Notes
?	Christine Hurtlin	France	13.23	

Final – 13 July
Wind: -0.3 m/s

Rank	Name	Nationality	Time	Notes
1st place, gold medalist(s)	Monique Éwanjé-Épée	France	12.92	
2nd place, silver medalist(s)	Anne Piquereau	France	12.99	
3rd place, bronze medalist(s)	Christine Hurtlin	France	13.24	
4	Sylvia Dethier	Belgium	13.42	

=== 400 meters hurdles ===
18 July

Rank	Name	Nationality	Time	Notes
1st place, gold medalist(s)	Hélène Huart	France	56.92	
2nd place, silver medalist(s)	Corinne Pierre-Joseph	France	57.10	
3rd place, bronze medalist(s)	Marie Womplou	Ivory Coast	57.78	
4	Annie Moelo	France	59.05	
5	Jill McDermid	Canada	59.17	
6	Nezha Bidouane	Morocco	59.69	
7	Kueneman	Canada	1:00.11	
8	Corinne Devrye	Belgium	1:01.97	

=== 4 × 100 meters relay ===
18 July

Rank	Nation	Competitors	Time	Notes
1st place, gold medalist(s)	France	Laurence Bily, Patricia Girard, Françoise Leroux, Marie-Christine Dubois	43.38	
2nd place, silver medalist(s)	Canada	Faye Roberts, Esmie Lawrence, France Gareau, Jillian Richardson	45.04	
3rd place, bronze medalist(s)	Belgium		45.24	
4	Senegal		46.11	
5	Morocco		46.90	
6	Quebec		47.92	
	Ivory Coast		DQ	

=== 4 × 400 meters relay ===
18 July

Rank	Nation	Competitors	Time	Notes
1st place, gold medalist(s)	France	Ketty Régent-Talbot, Évelyne Élien, Corinne Pierre-Joseph, Hélène Huart	3:31.89	
2nd place, silver medalist(s)	Canada	Rosey Edeh, France Gareau, Jeanette Woods, Charmaine Crooks	3:32.96	
3rd place, bronze medalist(s)	Ivory Coast	Alimata Koné, Louise Koré, Marie Womplou, Célestine N'Drin	3:37.58	
4	Quebec		3:42.70	
5	Morocco		3:45.83	

=== High jump ===
17 July

Rank	Name	Nationality	Result	Notes
1st place, gold medalist(s)	Maryse Éwanjé-Épée	France	1.88	
2nd place, silver medalist(s)	Linda Cameron	Canada	1.86	
3rd place, bronze medalist(s)	Leslie Estwick	Canada	1.81	
3rd place, bronze medalist(s)	Beatrice Landes	France	1.81	
5	Koffi	Ivory Coast	1.78	
5	Shelley Morris	Canada	1.78	
7	Duthilleul	Quebec	1.74	
8	Nadia Htitou	Morocco	1.65	

=== Long jump ===
16 July

Rank	Name	Nationality	Result	Notes
1st place, gold medalist(s)	Florence Colle	France	6.56	
2nd place, silver medalist(s)	Géraldine Bonnin	France	6.25	
3rd place, bronze medalist(s)	Françoise Cochard	France	6.23	
4	Corinne Devrye	Belgium	5.98	
5	Gillis	Canada	5.96	
6	Tania Redhead	Canada	5.90	
7	Jolly	Canada	5.64	
8	Sandrine Hennart	Belgium	5.81	

=== Shot put ===
17 July

Rank	Name	Nationality	Result	Notes
1st place, gold medalist(s)	Léone Bertimon	France	15.70	
2nd place, silver medalist(s)	Martine Jean-Michel	France	15.42	
3rd place, bronze medalist(s)	Brigitte De Leeuw	Belgium	15.18	
4	Annick Maurice	France	15.04	
5	Shannon Kekula	Canada	14.93	
6	Fouzia Fatihi	Morocco	13.80	
7	Fitch	Canada	13.30	
8	Georgette Reed	Canada	13.03	

=== Discus throw ===
18 July

Rank	Name	Nationality	Result	Notes
1st place, gold medalist(s)	Agnès Teppe	France	54.94	
2nd place, silver medalist(s)	Catherine Beauvais	France	52.40	
3rd place, bronze medalist(s)	Hanan Ahmed Khaled	Egypt	50.60	
4	Shannon Kekula	Canada	48.72	
5	Zoubida Laayouni	Morocco	48.66	
6	Theresa Brick	Canada	48.16	
7	Nabila Mouelhi	Tunisia	44.38	
8	Latifa Allam	Morocco	44.18	
	Valérie Hanicque	France	NM	

=== Javelin throw ===
13 July

Rank	Name	Nationality	Result	Notes
1st place, gold medalist(s)	Lori LaRowe	Canada	55.14	
2nd place, silver medalist(s)	Christine Gravier	France	53.12	
3rd place, bronze medalist(s)	Faye Roblin	Canada	51.82	
6	Martine Bardaine	France	47.42	
8	Corinne Prevost	France	45.76	

=== Heptathlon ===
16–17 July

Rank	Athlete	Nationality	100m H	HJ	SP	200m	LJ	JT	800m	Points	Notes
1st place, gold medalist(s)	Donna Smellie	Canada								5620	
2nd place, silver medalist(s)	Catherine Bond	Canada								5588	
3rd place, bronze medalist(s)	Hélène Bossé	France	14.96	1.78	10.82	26.41	5.88	40.64	2:20.98	5448	
4	Janet Scott	Canada								5379	
5	Kout Ouan	Ivory Coast								4982	
6	Annie Potvin	Canada								4653	
