= Athletics at the 1987 Pan American Games – Women's 200 metres =

Women's 200 metres at the Pan American Games

The women's 200 metres event at the 1987 Pan American Games was held in Indianapolis, United States on 12, 13 and 15 August.

== Medalists ==
Gold	Silver	Bronze
Gwen Torrence; United States	Randy Givens; United States	Pauline Davis; Bahamas

== Results ==
=== Heats ===
Wind:
Heat 1: -1.2 m/s, Heat 2: -1.2 m/s, Heat 3: -0.1 m/s

Rank	Heat	Name	Nationality	Time	Notes
1	1	Gwen Torrence	United States	23.10	Q
2	2	Pauline Davis	Bahamas	23.29	Q
3	3	Randy Givens	United States	23.40	Q
4	1	Angela Phipps	Canada	23.58	Q
5	2	Vivienne Spence	Jamaica	23.74	Q
6	1	Ester Petitón	Cuba	23.82	Q
7	3	Amparo Caicedo	Colombia	24.19	Q
8	2	Claudia Acerenza	Uruguay	24.21	Q
9	1	Yolande Straughn	Barbados	24.37	Q
10	2	Sheila de Oliveira	Brazil	24.42	Q
11	2	Susana Armenteros	Cuba	24.44	q
12	1	Jocelyn Joseph	Antigua and Barbuda	24.65	q
13	1	Deborah Bell	Argentina	24.86	q
14	3	Ruth Morris	United States Virgin Islands	24.98	Q
15	1	Soledad Acerenza	Uruguay	25.00	q
16	3	Cleide Amaral	Brazil	25.10	Q
17	3	Zoila Stewart	Costa Rica	25.13	
18	2	Jacqueline Hinds	Barbados	25.27	
19	3	Christa Schumann	Guatemala	25.82	
20	3	Glenmarie David	Antigua and Barbuda	25.92	
21	2	Cislyn Blake	United States Virgin Islands	26.27	
	2	Olga Escalante	Colombia	DNS	

=== Semifinals ===
Wind:
Heat 1: +1.4 m/s, Heat 2: -0.9 m/s

Rank	Heat	Name	Nationality	Time	Notes
1	1	Gwen Torrence	United States	22.78	Q
2	2	Randy Givens	United States	23.00	Q
3	2	Pauline Davis	Bahamas	23.02	Q
4	1	Angela Phipps	Canada	23.28	Q
5	2	Ester Petitón	Cuba	23.55	Q
6	1	Vivienne Spence	Jamaica	23.65	Q
7	1	Susana Armenteros	Cuba	23.98	Q
8	2	Yolande Straughn	Barbados	24.02	Q
9	1	Claudia Acerenza	Uruguay	24.14	NR
10	2	Sheila de Oliveira	Brazil	24.17	
11	2	Amparo Caicedo	Colombia	24.18	
12	2	Jocelyn Joseph	Antigua and Barbuda	24.25	
13	2	Deborah Bell	Argentina	24.61	
14	1	Ruth Morris	United States Virgin Islands	24.79	
15	1	Cleide Amaral	Brazil	24.91	
16	1	Soledad Acerenza	Uruguay	25.20	

=== Final ===
Wind: +2.2 m/s

Rank	Lane	Name	Nationality	Time	Notes
1st place, gold medalist(s)	5	Gwen Torrence	United States	22.52	
2nd place, silver medalist(s)	4	Randy Givens	United States	22.71	
3rd place, bronze medalist(s)	3	Pauline Davis	Bahamas	22.99	
4	6	Angela Phipps	Canada	23.22	
5	7	Vivienne Spence	Jamaica	23.59	
6	8	Ester Petitón	Cuba	23.67	
7	1	Susana Armenteros	Cuba	23.81	
8	2	Yolande Straughn	Barbados	24.16	
