= 1986 World Junior Championships in Athletics – Women's 100 metres =

The women's 100 metres event at the 1986 World Junior Championships in Athletics was held in Athens, Greece, at Olympic Stadium on 16 and 17 July.

== Medalists ==
Gold	Tina Iheagwam; Nigeria
Silver	Caryl Smith; United States
Bronze	Maicel Malone; United States

== Results ==
=== Final ===
17 July
Wind: +0.9 m/s

Rank	Name	Nationality	Time	Notes
1st place, gold medalist(s)	Tina Iheagwam	Nigeria	11.34	
2nd place, silver medalist(s)	Caryl Smith	United States	11.46	
3rd place, bronze medalist(s)	Maicel Malone	United States	11.49	
4	Katrin Krabbe	East Germany	11.49	
5	Claudia Lepping	West Germany	11.56	
6	Muriel Leroy	France	11.60	
7	Odiah Sidibé	France	11.69	
	Mary Onyali	Nigeria	DQ	

=== Semifinals ===
17 July

==== Semifinal 1 ====
Wind: -1.3 m/s

Rank	Name	Nationality	Time	Notes
1	Caryl Smith	United States	11.59	Q
2	Odiah Sidibé	France	11.64	Q
3	Claudia Lepping	West Germany	11.67	q
4	Sharon Dolby	United Kingdom	11.85	
5	Ina Morgenstern	East Germany	11.86	
6	Dorota Krawczak	Poland	12.05	
7	Irina Sergeyeva	Soviet Union	12.17	
8	Dagmar Hölbl	Austria	12.22	

==== Semifinal 2 ====
Wind: +1.6 m/s

Rank	Name	Nationality	Time	Notes
1	Tina Iheagwam	Nigeria	11.44	Q
2	Katrin Krabbe	East Germany	11.55	Q
3	Maicel Malone	United States	11.65	q
4	Corina Rosioru	Romania	11.86	
5	Ina Cordes	West Germany	11.89	
6	Joan Booth	United Kingdom	12.03	
7	Méryem Oumezdi	Morocco	12.24	
	Yolanda Díaz	Spain	DNS	

==== Semifinal 3 ====
Wind: +2.5 m/s

Rank	Name	Nationality	Time	Notes
1	Mary Onyali	Nigeria	11.42 w	Q
2	Muriel Leroy	France	11.51 w	Q
3	Katie Anderson	Canada	11.72 w	
4	Olga Kosyakova	Soviet Union	11.73 w	
5	Toshie Kitada	Japan	11.91 w	
6	Buenaventura Santana	Dominican Republic	11.99 w	
7	Melissa Moore	Australia	12.00 w	
8	Ximena Restrepo	Colombia	12.09 w	

=== Heats ===
16 July

==== Heat 1 ====
Wind: +1.8 m/s

Rank	Name	Nationality	Time	Notes
1	Caryl Smith	United States	11.68	Q
2	Ina Morgenstern	East Germany	11.82	Q
3	Sharon Dolby	United Kingdom	11.86	Q
4	Melissa Moore	Australia	12.14	q
5	Dorothy Isidore	Seychelles	13.31	
6	Denise Ephraim	Nauru	13.70	

==== Heat 2 ====
Wind: +1.8 m/s

Rank	Name	Nationality	Time	Notes
1	Maicel Malone	United States	11.65	Q
2	Katrin Krabbe	East Germany	11.79	Q
3	Yolanda Díaz	Spain	12.02	Q
4	Guðrún Arnardóttir	Iceland	12.62	
5	Maria Luna	Brazil	12.71	
6	Leung Wai Kwan	Hong Kong	13.34	
7	Ani Bakalia	Lebanon	13.49	

==== Heat 3 ====
Wind: +1.8 m/s

Rank	Name	Nationality	Time	Notes
1	Muriel Leroy	France	11.71	Q
2	Méryem Oumezdi	Morocco	12.37	Q
3	Irina Sergeyeva	Soviet Union	12.39	Q
4	Rita Gomes	Brazil	12.60	
5	Sharon Mifsud	Gibraltar	12.90	
6	Alexandra Scerri	Malta	13.27	
7	Zaide Uao	Philippines	13.29	

==== Heat 4 ====
Wind: +1.2 m/s

Rank	Name	Nationality	Time	Notes
1	Tina Iheagwam	Nigeria	11.68	Q
2	Buenaventura Santana	Dominican Republic	12.02	Q
3	Dagmar Hölbl	Austria	12.14	Q
4	Nicole Charles	Trinidad and Tobago	12.28	
5	Soledad Bacarezza	Chile	12.57	
6	Sara Rossini	San Marino	12.89	

==== Heat 5 ====
Wind: +0.3 m/s

Rank	Name	Nationality	Time	Notes
1	Odiah Sidibé	France	11.62	Q
2	Mary Onyali	Nigeria	11.68	Q
3	Claudia Lepping	West Germany	11.73	Q
4	Toshie Kitada	Japan	11.98	q
5	Ximena Restrepo	Colombia	12.10	q
6	Aïda Diop	Senegal	12.88	
7	Cathy Rasehei	Papua New Guinea	13.07	

==== Heat 6 ====
Wind: -0.6 m/s

Rank	Name	Nationality	Time	Notes
1	Olga Kosyakova	Soviet Union	11.82	Q
2	Ina Cordes	West Germany	11.85	Q
3	Dorota Krawczak	Poland	12.07	Q
4	Stephanie Taylor	Canada	12.49	
5	Coumba Diarra Thidune	Senegal	12.76	
6	Rosanna Browne	Anguilla	12.98	
7	Fhelin-Chantal Ngokangath	Congo	13.17	

==== Heat 7 ====
Wind: +1.5 m/s

Rank	Name	Nationality	Time	Notes
1	Katie Anderson	Canada	11.82	Q
2	Corina Rosioru	Romania	11.90	Q
3	Joan Booth	United Kingdom	12.08	Q
4	Ayako Nomura	Japan	12.32	
5	Zuleyka Beard	Panama	12.36	
6	K.H. Salaimma	India	12.49	
7	Carol Quiros Delgado	Costa Rica	12.87	

== Participation ==
According to an unofficial count, 47 athletes from 36 countries participated in the event.

- Anguilla (1)
- Australia (1)
- Austria (1)
- Brazil (2)
- Canada (2)
- Chile (1)
- Colombia (1)
- Congo (1)
- Costa Rica (1)
- Dominican Republic (1)
- East Germany (2)
- France (2)
- Gibraltar (1)
- Hong Kong (1)
- Iceland (1)
- India (1)
- Japan (2)
- Lebanon (1)
- Malta (1)
- Morocco (1)
- Nauru (1)
- Nigeria (2)
- Panama (1)
- Papua New Guinea (1)
- Philippines (1)
- Poland (1)
- Romania (1)
- San Marino (1)
- Senegal (2)
- Seychelles (1)
- Soviet Union (2)
- Spain (1)
- Trinidad and Tobago (1)
- United Kingdom (2)
- United States (2)
- West Germany (2)
