= Athletics at the 1986 Commonwealth Games – Women's 100 metres =

Women's 100 metres at the Commonwealth Games

The women's 100 metres event at the 1986 Commonwealth Games was held at the Meadowbank Stadium in Edinburgh on 27 July 1986.

The winning margin was 0.01 seconds which as of 2024 remains the narrowest winning margin in the women's 100 metres at these games.

== Medalists ==
Gold	Silver	Bronze
Heather Oakes; England	Paula Dunn; England	Angella Issajenko; Canada

== Results ==
=== Heats ===
Qualification: First 3 of each heat (Q) and the next 2 fastest (q) qualified for the final.

Wind:
Heat 1: +2.5 m/s, Heat 2: +2.0 m/s

Rank	Heat	Name	Nationality	Time	Notes
1	1	Paula Dunn	England	11.14	Q
2	2	Heather Oakes	England	11.22	Q
3	2	Angella Issajenko	Canada	11.25	Q
4	1	Angela Bailey	Canada	11.31	Q
5	1	Pippa Windle	England	11.52	Q
6	1	Kaye Jeffrey	Scotland	11.55	q
7	1	Sallyanne Short	Wales	11.60	q
7	2	Sandra Whittaker	Scotland	11.60	Q
9	1	Helen Miles	Wales	11.63	
10	2	Esmie Lawrence	Canada	11.68	
11	2	Kerry Johnson	Australia	11.76	
12	2	Carmen Smart	Wales	11.83	
13	2	Danaa Myhill	Isle of Man	11.92	
14	1	Judith Rodgers	Northern Ireland	12.04	
15	2	Sharon Mifsud	Gibraltar	12.78	

=== Final ===
Wind: +2.3 m/s

Rank	Lane	Name	Nationality	Time	Notes
1st place, gold medalist(s)	4	Heather Oakes	England	11.20	
2nd place, silver medalist(s)	6	Paula Dunn	England	11.21	
3rd place, bronze medalist(s)	3	Angella Issajenko	Canada	11.21	
4	5	Angela Bailey	Canada	11.35	
5	1	Sandra Whittaker	Scotland	11.59	
6	8	Kaye Jeffrey	Scotland	11.59	
7	2	Pippa Windle	England	11.68	
8	7	Sallyanne Short	Wales	11.74	
