= Kerry Johnson (athlete) =

Australian sprinter (born 1963)

Personal information
- Full name: Kerry Dale Johnson
- Born: 23 October 1963 (age 62) New South Wales, Australia
- Height: 1.63 m (5 ft 4 in)
- Weight: 50 kg (110 lb)

Sport
- Sport: Athletics
- Events: 100 m, 200 m
Medal record
Representing Australia
Commonwealth Games
Gold medal – first place	1990 Auckland	4x100m relay
Silver medal – second place	1990 Auckland	100m
Silver medal – second place	1990 Auckland	200m

Kerry Dale Johnson (born 23 October 1963) is an Australian retired athlete who competed in the sprints. She represented her country at the 1988 and 1992 Summer Olympics. In addition, she won one gold and two silver medals at the 1990 Commonwealth Games.

She has personal bests of 11.19 seconds in the 100 metres (+1.6 m/s, Auckland 1990) and 22.82 seconds in the 200 metres (+1.7 m/s, Chiba 1988).

In 1988 she was Australian 100 yards champion, with a wind assisted time of 10.48. She also won the National 200 title in 88 as well.

== International competitions ==
Year	Competition	Venue	Position	Event	Notes
Representing Australia
1985	Universiade	Kobe, Japan	6th (h)	100 m	12.08
1985	Universiade	Kobe, Japan	8th (sf)	200 m	25.08
1985	World Cup	Canberra, Australia	–	4 × 100 m relay	DQ^{1}
1986	Commonwealth Games	Edinburgh, United Kingdom	11th (h)	100 m	11.76
1986	Commonwealth Games	Edinburgh, United Kingdom	10th (h)	200 m	23.96
1986	Commonwealth Games	Edinburgh, United Kingdom	–	4 × 100 m relay	DNF
1988	Olympic Games	Seoul, South Korea	24th (qf)	100 m	11.42
1988	Olympic Games	Seoul, South Korea	17th (qf)	200 m	23.01
1988	Olympic Games	Seoul, South Korea	–	4 × 100 m relay	DNF
1990	Commonwealth Games	Auckland, New Zealand	2nd	100 m	11.17 (w)
1990	Commonwealth Games	Auckland, New Zealand	2nd	200 m	22.88
1990	Commonwealth Games	Auckland, New Zealand	1st	4 × 100 m relay	43.87
1991	World Championships	Tokyo, Japan	11th (sf)	100 m	11.38
1991	World Championships	Tokyo, Japan	8th	4 × 100 m relay	43.79
1992	Olympic Games	Barcelona, Spain	19th (qf)	100 m	11.59
1992	Olympic Games	Barcelona, Spain	6th	4 × 100 m relay	43.77

^{1}Representing Oceania
