= 1986 World Junior Championships in Athletics – Women's 200 metres =

The women's 200 metres event at the 1986 World Junior Championships in Athletics was held in Athens, Greece, at Olympic Stadium on 18 and 19 July.

== Medalists ==
Gold	Falilat Ogunkoya; Nigeria
Silver	Mary Onyali; Nigeria
Bronze	Katrin Krabbe; East Germany

== Results ==
=== Final ===
19 July
Wind: +0.6 m/s

Rank	Name	Nationality	Time	Notes
1st place, gold medalist(s)	Falilat Ogunkoya	Nigeria	23.11	
2nd place, silver medalist(s)	Mary Onyali	Nigeria	23.30	
3rd place, bronze medalist(s)	Katrin Krabbe	East Germany	23.31	
4	Carlette Guidry	United States	23.46	
5	Oksana Kovalyova	Soviet Union	23.60	
6	Ina Cordes	West Germany	23.65	
7	Muriel Leroy	France	23.69	
	Tatyana Chebykina	Soviet Union	DNF	

=== Semifinals ===
18 July

==== Semifinal 1 ====
Wind: -0.8 m/s

Rank	Name	Nationality	Time	Notes
1	Falilat Ogunkoya	Nigeria	23.60	Q
2	Tatyana Chebykina	Soviet Union	23.96	Q
3	Claudia Lepping	West Germany	23.98	
4	Ximena Restrepo	Colombia	24.42	
5	Stephanie Taylor	Canada	24.71	
6	Toshie Kitada	Japan	24.81	
7	Diane Dunrod	Saint Kitts and Nevis	24.85	
	Tamaris Fiebig	East Germany	DNS	

==== Semifinal 2 ====
Wind: +0.5 m/s

Rank	Name	Nationality	Time	Notes
1	Mary Onyali	Nigeria	23.35	Q
2	Katrin Krabbe	East Germany	23.43	Q
3	Maicel Malone	United States	23.72	
4	Sallyanne Short	United Kingdom	24.20	
5	Katie Anderson	Canada	24.38	
6	Dorota Krawczak	Poland	24.67	
7	Donatella Dal Bianco	Italy	24.68	
8	Ayako Nomura	Japan	25.00	

==== Semifinal 3 ====
Wind: -1.0 m/s

Rank	Name	Nationality	Time	Notes
1	Oksana Kovalyova	Soviet Union	23.56	Q
2	Ina Cordes	West Germany	23.59	Q
3	Muriel Leroy	France	23.65	q
4	Carlette Guidry	United States	23.69	q
5	Hayley Clements	United Kingdom	23.92	
6	Daniela Weegerová	Czechoslovakia	24.05	
7	Corina Rosioru	Romania	24.06	
8	Mónika Mádai	Hungary	24.69	

=== Heats ===
18 July

==== Heat 1 ====
Wind: -0.5 m/s

Rank	Name	Nationality	Time	Notes
1	Maicel Malone	United States	23.74	Q
2	Daniela Weegerová	Czechoslovakia	24.30	Q
3	Dorota Krawczak	Poland	24.42	Q
4	Jupira da Graça	Brazil	25.03	
5	Carol Quiros Delgado	Costa Rica	26.54	
6	Fhelin-Chantal Ngokangath	Congo	27.18	

==== Heat 2 ====
Wind: -0.2 m/s

Rank	Name	Nationality	Time	Notes
1	Falilat Ogunkoya	Nigeria	23.50	Q
2	Ximena Restrepo	Colombia	24.25	Q
3	Katie Anderson	Canada	24.45	Q
4	Mónika Mádai	Hungary	24.78	q
5	Chen Ya-Li	Chinese Taipei	24.99	
6	Soledad Bacarezza	Chile	25.69	
7	Coumba Diarra Thidune	Senegal	26.28	
8	Rosanna Browne	Anguilla	26.46	

==== Heat 3 ====
Wind: +0.2 m/s

Rank	Name	Nationality	Time	Notes
1	Mary Onyali	Nigeria	23.22	Q
2	Oksana Kovalyova	Soviet Union	23.61	Q
3	Ina Cordes	West Germany	24.03	Q
4	Ayako Nomura	Japan	24.89	q
5	Zuleyka Beard	Panama	25.18	
6	Christine Duvergé	Mauritius	25.48	

==== Heat 4 ====
Wind: +0.6 m/s

Rank	Name	Nationality	Time	Notes
1	Katrin Krabbe	East Germany	23.78	Q
2	Carlette Guidry	United States	24.14	Q
3	Stephanie Taylor	Canada	24.58	Q
4	Diane Dunrod	Saint Kitts and Nevis	24.77	q
5	Sharon Mifsud	Gibraltar	26.05	
6	Leung Wai Kwan	Hong Kong	27.30	
7	Fowzia Ibrahim Jilaow	Somalia	28.43	

==== Heat 5 ====
Wind: +0.2 m/s

Rank	Name	Nationality	Time	Notes
1	Muriel Leroy	France	23.48	Q
2	Hayley Clements	United Kingdom	23.90	Q
3	Donatella Dal Bianco	Italy	24.06	Q
4	Patricia Serret	Mauritius	25.28	
5	Rita Gomes	Brazil	25.36	
6	Ausa Mwendachabe	Zambia	26.12	
7	Guilhermina da Cruz	Angola	26.21	
8	Zaide Uao	Philippines	26.57	

==== Heat 6 ====
Wind: -1.8 m/s

Rank	Name	Nationality	Time	Notes
1	Claudia Lepping	West Germany	24.35	Q
2	Corina Rosioru	Romania	24.48	Q
3	Toshie Kitada	Japan	24.68	Q
4	Dagmar Hölbl	Austria	25.12	
5	Katerína Kóffa	Greece	25.67	
6	Alexandra Scerri	Malta	27.08	
7	Dorothy Isidore	Seychelles	27.16	
8	Denise Ephraim	Nauru	28.80	

==== Heat 7 ====
Wind: -0.4 m/s

Rank	Name	Nationality	Time	Notes
1	Tamaris Fiebig	East Germany	23.92	Q
2	Tatyana Chebykina	Soviet Union	24.03	Q
3	Sallyanne Short	United Kingdom	24.23	Q
4	Guðrún Arnardóttir	Iceland	25.85	
5	Anna Cherry	Saint Lucia	26.32	
6	Valeria López	Ecuador	26.67	

== Participation ==
According to an unofficial count, 49 athletes from 39 countries participated in the event.

- Angola (1)
- Anguilla (1)
- Austria (1)
- Brazil (2)
- Canada (2)
- Chile (1)
- Chinese Taipei (1)
- Colombia (1)
- Congo (1)
- Costa Rica (1)
- Czechoslovakia (1)
- East Germany (2)
- Ecuador (1)
- France (1)
- Gibraltar (1)
- Greece (1)
- Hong Kong (1)
- Hungary (1)
- Iceland (1)
- Italy (1)
- Japan (2)
- Malta (1)
- Mauritius (2)
- Nauru (1)
- Nigeria (2)
- Panama (1)
- Philippines (1)
- Poland (1)
- Romania (1)
- Saint Kitts and Nevis (1)
- Saint Lucia (1)
- Senegal (1)
- Seychelles (1)
- Somalia (1)
- Soviet Union (2)
- United Kingdom (2)
- United States (2)
- West Germany (2)
- Zambia (1)
