= 1986 World Junior Championships in Athletics – Women's 4 × 100 metres relay =

The women's 4×100 metres relay event at the 1986 World Junior Championships in Athletics was held in Athens, Greece, at Olympic Stadium on 20 July.

== Medalists ==
Gold	Carlette Guidry; Caryl Smith; Denise Liles; Maicel Malone; United States
Silver	Ina Morgenstern; Katrin Krabbe; Britta Beisbier; Heike Tillack; East Germany
Bronze	Tina Iheagwam; Caroline Nwajei; Falilat Ogunkoya; Mary Onyali; Nigeria

== Results ==
=== Final ===
20 July

Rank	Nation	Competitors	Time	Notes
1st place, gold medalist(s)	United States	Carlette Guidry; Caryl Smith; Denise Liles; Maicel Malone	43.78	
2nd place, silver medalist(s)	East Germany	Ina Morgenstern; Katrin Krabbe; Britta Beisbier; Heike Tillack	43.97	
3rd place, bronze medalist(s)	Nigeria	Tina Iheagwam; Caroline Nwajei; Falilat Ogunkoya; Mary Onyali	44.13	
4	France	Valerie Rome; Odiah Sidibé; Veronique Clachet; Muriel Leroy	44.29	
5	Soviet Union	Olga Kosyakova; Oksana Kovalyova; Tatyana Chebykina; Irina Sergeyeva	44.58	
6	United Kingdom	Sharon Dolby; Kim Hogg; Hayley Clements; Sallyanne Short	45.18	
7	Canada	Maxine Scringer; Katie Anderson; Stephanie Taylor; Trina Penny	45.79	
	West Germany	Birgit Leinemann; Ulrike Kubla; Ina Cordes; Claudia Lepping	DQ	

== Participation ==
According to an unofficial count, 32 athletes from 8 countries participated in the event.

- Canada (4)
- East Germany (4)
- France (4)
- Nigeria (4)
- Soviet Union (4)
- United Kingdom (4)
- United States (4)
- West Germany (4)
