= Toshie Iwamoto =

Japanese sprinter (born 1969)

Personal information
- Nationality: Japanese
- Born: Toshie Kitada; 9 September 1969 (age 57) Osaka Prefecture, Japan
- Education: Osaka University of Health and Sport Sciences
- Height: 1.67 m (5 ft 6 in)
- Weight: 56 kg (123 lb)

Sport
- Country: Japan
- Sport: Track and field
- Events: 100 metres 200 metres

Achievements and titles
- Personal bests: 60 m: 7.40 (1996) 100 m: 11.48 (1996) 200 m: 23.73 (1996)
Medal record
Women's athletics
Representing Japan
Asian Games
Bronze medal – third place	1994 Hiroshima	4×100 m relay
Asian Championships
Bronze medal – third place	1991 Kuala Lumpur	4×100 m relay
East Asian Games
Silver medal – second place	1997 Busan	4×100 m relay

Toshie Iwamoto (岩本 敏恵, Iwamoto Toshie; née Kitada (北田), born 9 September 1969 in Osaka Prefecture) is a Japanese retired sprinter. She competed in the 4 × 100 metres relay at the 1991 World Championships in Tokyo, 1997 World Championships in Athens and 1999 World Championships in Seville. She is the former Japanese record holder in the 100 metres, 200 metres, 4 × 100 metres relay and indoor 60 metres.

== Personal bests ==
Event	Time (s)	Competition	Venue	Date	Notes
60 m	7.40 (Indoor)		Maebashi, Japan	12 February 1996	Former NIR
100 m	11.48 (wind: +0.5 m/s)	Japanese Championships	Osaka, Japan	7 June 1996	Former NR
200 m	23.73 (wind: +0.4 m/s)	Mikio Oda Memorial	Hiroshima, Japan	29 April 1996	Former NR

== International competition ==
Year	Competition	Venue	Position	Event	Time (s)	Notes
Representing Japan
1986	World Junior Championships	Athens, Greece	15th (sf)	100 m	11.91 (wind: +2.5 m/s)	
1986	World Junior Championships	Athens, Greece	21st (sf)	200 m	24.81 (wind: -0.8 m/s)	
1986	Asian Games	Seoul, South Korea	5th	4×100 m relay	46.30 (relay leg: 4th)	
1989	Asian Championships	New Delhi, India	6th	100 m	11.93 (wind: +0.4 m/s)	
1989	Asian Championships	New Delhi, India	4th	4×100 m relay	45.98 (relay leg: 2nd)	
1991	World Championships	Tokyo, Japan	13th (h)	4×100 m relay	44.85 (relay leg: 3rd)	
1991	Asian Championships	Kuala Lumpur, Malaysia	3rd	4×100 m relay	45.25 (relay leg: 3rd)	
1994	Asian Games	Hiroshima, Japan	4th	100 m	11.58 (wind: +0.8 m/s)	NR
1994	Asian Games	Hiroshima, Japan	3rd	4×100 m relay	44.57 (relay leg: 2nd)	NR
1997	East Asian Games	Busan, South Korea	(h)	100 m	11.68 (wind: +2.4 m/s)	
1997	East Asian Games	Busan, South Korea	2nd	4×100 m relay	45.16 (relay leg: 2nd)	
1997	World Championships	Athens, Greece	15th (sf)	4×100 m relay	44.56 (relay leg: 3rd)	
1998	Asian Games	Bangkok, Thailand	5th	4×100 m relay	44.80 (relay leg: 3rd)	
1999	World Championships	Seville, Spain	14th (h)	4×100 m relay	44.80 (relay leg: 1st)	

== National titles ==
- Japanese Championships
  - 100 m: 1989, 1994, 1995, 1996
  - 200 m: 1989, 1994, 1995, 1996
