= Maicel Malone-Wallace =

American track and field athlete

Personal information
- Born: Maicel D. Malone; June 12, 1969 (age 57) Indianapolis, Indiana, U.S.
- Spouse: Aaron Wallace (m. 1994)
Medal record
Women's athletics (track and field)
Representing United States
Olympic Games
Gold medal – first place	1996 Atlanta	4 × 400 m relay
World Championships
Gold medal – first place	1993 Stuttgart	4 × 400 m relay
Silver medal – second place	1997 Athens	4 × 400 m relay
Silver medal – second place	1999 Seville	4 × 400 m relay
Pan American Junior Championships
Gold medal – first place	1986 Winter Park	4 × 100 m relay
Silver medal – second place	1986 Winter Park	100 m
Silver medal – second place	1986 Winter Park	200 m
Summer Universiade
Gold medal – first place	1991 Sheffield	400 m
Gold medal – first place	1991 Sheffield	4 x 400 m relay
Gold medal – first place	1993 Buffalo	4 x 400 m relay

Maicel Donee Malone-Wallace (born June 12, 1969) is an American former track and field athlete who specialised in the 400 meters. She was on the 1996 Olympic Games gold medal-winning team in the women's 4 × 400 meters relay for the United States.

Running for the Arizona State Sun Devils track and field team, Malone-Wallace won the 1990 400 meters at the NCAA Division I Outdoor Track and Field Championships and the 1991 4 × 400 meter relay at the NCAA Division I Indoor Track and Field Championships.

== Achievements ==
Year	Competition	Venue	Position	Event	Notes
Representing the United States
1986	World Junior Championships	Athens, Greece	3rd	100 m	11.49 (wind: +0.9 m/s)
1986	World Junior Championships	Athens, Greece	8th (sf)	200 m	23.72 (wind: +0.5 m/s)
1986	World Junior Championships	Athens, Greece	1st	4 × 100 m relay	43.78
1988	World Junior Championships	Sudbury, Canada	2nd	400 m	52.23
1990	Goodwill Games	Seattle, United States	2nd	4 × 400 m	3:24.53
1991	Universiade	Sheffield, United Kingdom	1st	400 m	50.65
1991	Universiade	Sheffield, United Kingdom	1st	4 × 400 m	3:27.93
1993	World Championships	Stuttgart, Germany	1st	4 × 400 m	3:16.71
1994	Goodwill Games	Saint Petersburg, Russia	2nd	400 m	50.60
1994	Goodwill Games	Saint Petersburg, Russia	1st	4 × 400 m	3;22.27
1995	World Championships	Gothenburg, Sweden	7th	400 m	50.99 (50.77)
1996	Olympic Games	Atlanta, United States	semifinal	400 m	51.16
1996	Olympic Games	Atlanta, United States	1st	4 × 400 m	3:20.91
1997	World Championships	Athens, Greece	semifinal	400 m	51.40 (50.77)
1997	World Championships	Athens, Greece	2nd	4 × 400 m	3:21.03
1999	World Championships	Seville, Spain	semifinal	400 m	50.93 (50.82)
1999	World Championships	Seville, Spain	2nd	4 × 400 m	3:22.09

Note: Results in parentheses, indicate superior time achieved in the previous round.
