= Tina Iheagwam =

Nigerian sprinter

Personal information
- Born: 3 April 1968 (age 58)

Sport
- Sport: Track and field
Medal record
Representing Nigeria
African Championships
| Silver medal – second place | 1989 Lagos | 100 m |
Summer Universiade
| Bronze medal – third place | 1987 Zagreb | 100 m |

Tina Iheagwam (born 3 April 1968) is a retired Nigerian athlete who competed in the 100 metres.

Iheagwam was an All-American sprinter for the Texas Southern Tigers track and field team in the NCAA.

== Achievements ==
| Year | Competition | Venue | Position | Event | Notes |
Representing Nigeria
| 1986 | World Junior Championships | Athens, Greece | 1st | 100m | 11.34 (wind: +0.9 m/s) |
| 1986 | World Junior Championships | Athens, Greece | 3rd | 4 × 100 m relay | 44.13 |
| 1987 | All-Africa Games | Nairobi, Kenya | 1st | 100 m | 11.32 |
| 1987 | All-Africa Games | Nairobi, Kenya | 3rd | 200 m | 23.56 |
| 1987 | Summer Universiade | Zagreb, Yugoslavia | 3rd | 100 m | 11.40 |
| 1989 | African Championships | Lagos, Nigeria | 2nd | 100 m | 11.28 |
| 1991 | All-Africa Games | Cairo, Egypt | 1st | 200 m | 22.82 |
