= Ester Petitón =

Cuban sprinter (born 1966)

Ester Petitón (born 1966) is a retired Cuban sprinter who specialized in the 200 and 400 metres.

She finished seventh in the 200 metres at the 1983 Pan American Games and sixth in the same event at the 1987 Pan American Games. At the 1987 Central American and Caribbean Championships she won the gold medal in 200 and the bronze medal in 400 metres. She also competed in the 400 metres at the 1987 World Championships without reaching the final. Petitón also became Cuban champion.

In the 4 × 100 metres relay she won a bronze medal at the 1982 Central American and Caribbean Games.

In the 4 × 400 metres relay she won a gold medal at the 1986 Central American and Caribbean Games and finished fourth at the 1987 Pan American Games. She also competed at the 1987 World Championships without reaching the final.
