= Valya Valova-Demireva =

Bulgarian sprinter

Personal information
- Nationality: Bulgarian
- Born: 23 August 1961 (age 64)

Sport
- Sport: Sprinting
- Event: 4 × 100 metres relay

Valya Valova-Demireva (born 23 August 1961) is a Bulgarian sprinter. She competed in the women's 4 × 100 metres relay at the 1988 Summer Olympics.
