= Athletics at the 1983 Pan American Games – Women's 200 metres =

Women's 200 metres at the Pan American Games

The women's 200 metres event at the 1983 Pan American Games was held in Caracas, Venezuela on 25 and 26 August.

== Medalists ==
Gold	Silver	Bronze
Randy Givens; United States	LaShon Nedd; United States	Luisa Ferrer; Cuba

== Results ==
=== Heats ===
Wind:
Heat 1: +0.5 m/s, Heat 2: +0.6 m/s

Rank	Heat	Name	Nationality	Time	Notes
1	2	LaShon Nedd	United States	23.34	Q
2	1	Randy Givens	United States	23.44	Q
3	1	Nilsa Paris	Puerto Rico	23.90	Q
4	2	Luisa Ferrer	Cuba	23.95	Q
5	1	Gillian Forde	Trinidad and Tobago	24.05	Q
6	1	Alma Vázquez	Mexico	24.10	q
7	1	Ester Petitón	Cuba	24.19	q
8	2	Margarita Grun	Uruguay	24.52	Q
9	2	Angela Williams	Trinidad and Tobago	24.66	
10	1	Joycelyn Joseph	Antigua and Barbuda	24.80	
11	2	Adriana Pero	Argentina	24.87	
12	1	Glennis Báez	Venezuela	25.56	
	2	Ruperta Charles	Antigua and Barbuda	DNS	

=== Final ===
Wind: -0.8 m/s

Rank	Name	Nationality	Time	Notes
1st place, gold medalist(s)	Randy Givens	United States	23.14	
2nd place, silver medalist(s)	LaShon Nedd	United States	23.39	
3rd place, bronze medalist(s)	Luisa Ferrer	Cuba	23.39	
4	Gillian Forde	Trinidad and Tobago	23.94	
5	Nilsa Paris	Puerto Rico	23.99	
6	Alma Vázquez	Mexico	24.32	
7	Ester Petitón	Cuba	24.52	
8	Margarita Grun	Uruguay	24.79	
