= Mary Onyali-Omagbemi =

Nigerian sprinter

Mary Onyali
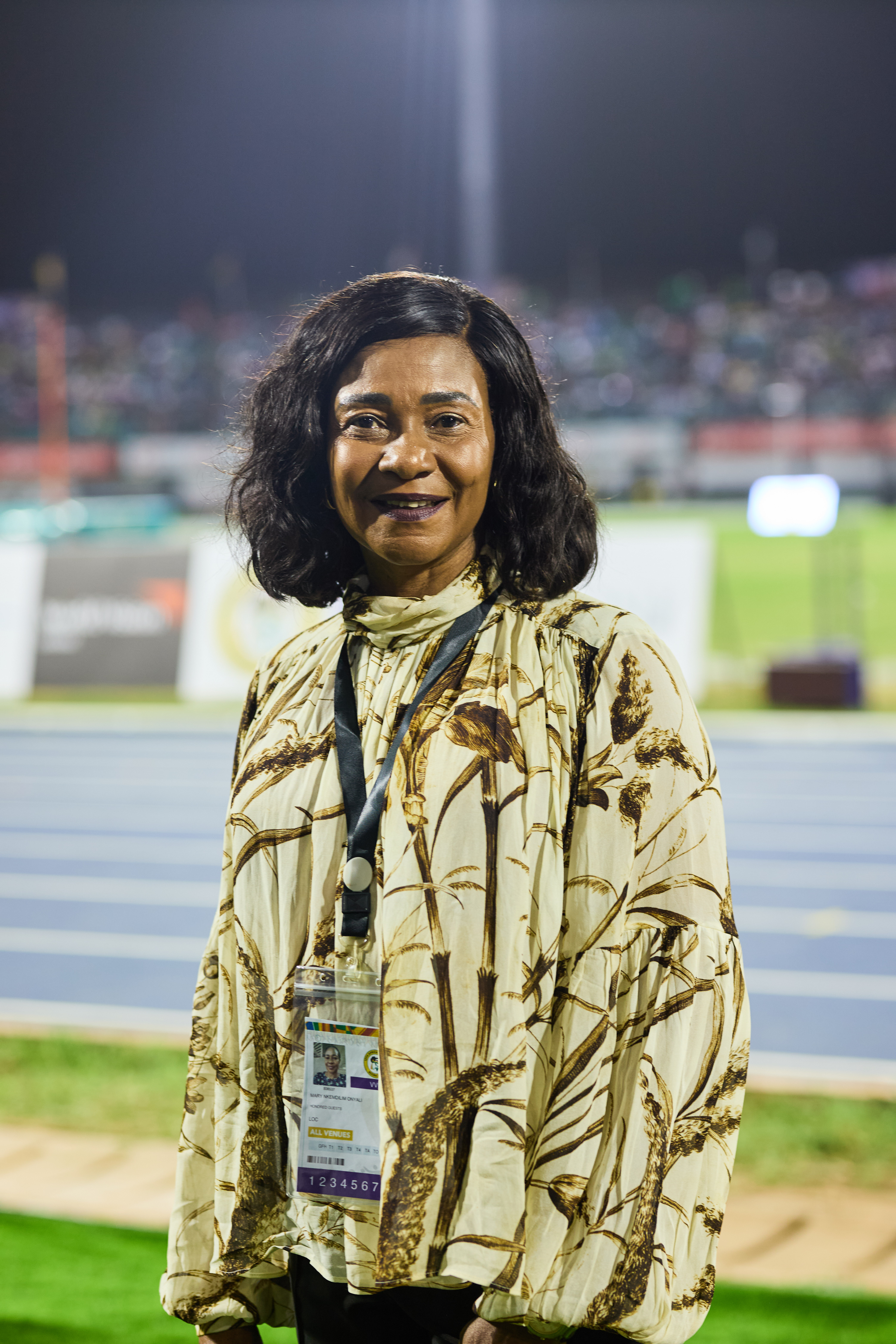
- Mary Onyali-Omagbemi at the 2023 African Games in Accra, Ghana.

Personal information
- Born: 3 February 1968 (age 58) Adamawa State, Nigeria
Medal record
Women's athletics
Representing Nigeria
Olympic Games
Bronze medal – third place	1992 Barcelona	4x100 m relay
Bronze medal – third place	1996 Atlanta	200 m
African Championships
Gold medal – first place	1988 Annaba	100 m
Gold medal – first place	1989 Lagos	100 m
Gold medal – first place	1989 Lagos	200 m
Gold medal – first place	1993 Durban	200 m
Gold medal – first place	1993 Durban	4×100 m
Gold medal – first place	1993 Durban	4×400 m
Gold medal – first place	1998 Dakar	100 m
Silver medal – second place	1985 Cairo	200 m
Silver medal – second place	1985 Cairo	4×100 m
World Junior Championships
Silver medal – second place	1986 Athens	200 m
Bronze medal – third place	1986 Athens	4x100 m relay
Commonwealth Games
Gold medal – first place	1994 Victoria	100 m
Silver medal – second place	1994 Victoria	200m
Gold medal – first place	1994 Victoria	4 × 100 m relay
Summer Universiade
Silver medal – second place	1987 Zagreb	200 m

Nkemdilim “Mary” Onyali-Omagbemi (née Onyali, born 3 February 1968) is a Nigerian former sprinter, she was a 5x Olympian 1988 – 2004. She had won the bronze medal in the 4 × 100 m relay at the 1992 Olympic Games and in the 200 m at the 1996 Olympic Games. She also won the 1994 Commonwealth Games 100 metres title.

== Career ==
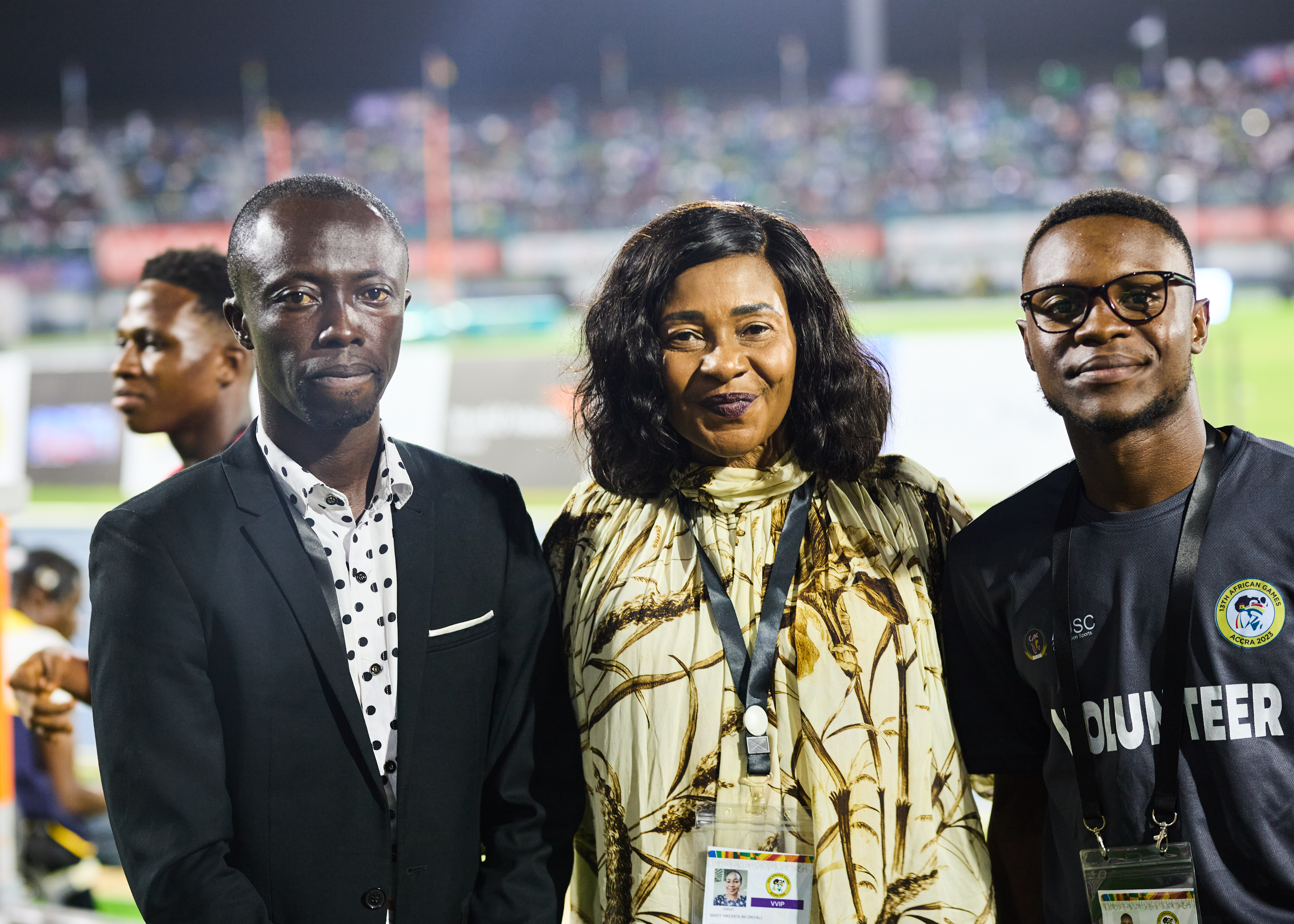
Mary being honoured at the 2023 African Games in Accra, Ghana.

Onyali-Omagbemi performed especially well in the All-Africa Games, winning a total of 7 individual medals in the short sprints. She won 100 m in 1991, 1995 and 2003 and took a bronze medal in 1987. Gold medals in 200 m were taken in 1987, 1995 and 2003. Furthermore, the Nigerian 4 × 100 m relay team won all races between 1987 and 2003, at the African Games.

Born Mary Onyali, by the time of the 2000 Olympics she was known as Mary Onyali-Omagbemi, having married fellow Nigerian sprinter Victor Omagbemi.

Competing for the Texas Southern Tigers track and field program, she won an NCAA title in the 200 metres.

Her consecutive Olympic appearances from 1988 to 2004 made her the first Nigerian to compete at five Olympics. This feat was equalled by table tennis players Bose Kaffo and Segun Toriola four years later in Beijing, China. Mary Onyali-Omagbemi currently serves as the Special Adviser (Technical) to the Director General of the National Sports Commission in Nigeria, and is a part of the consultation committee for the proposed Sports University of Nigeria, Idumuje-Ugboko.

On the 21st of September 2020, she was made one of the ambassadors of the re-branded National Principal's Cup; a grassroots championship tournament that was popular across Nigeria that discovered many talents, some who were former Super Eagles stars.

== Achievements ==
Year	Competition	Venue	Position	Event	Notes
Representing Nigeria
1986	World Junior Championships	Athens, Greece	1st (sf)	100m	11.42 w (wind: +2.5 m/s)
1986	World Junior Championships	Athens, Greece	2nd	200m	23.30 (wind: +0.6 m/s)
1986	World Junior Championships	Athens, Greece	3rd	4 × 100 m relay	44.13
1987	World Indoor Championships	Indianapolis, United States	5th	200 m	23.56
1987	All-Africa Games	Nairobi, Kenya	3rd	100 m	11.47
1987	All-Africa Games	Nairobi, Kenya	1st	200 m	22.66
1987	World Championships	Rome, Italy	6th	200 m	22.52
1988	Olympic Games	Seoul, South Korea	semi-finals	200 m	22.43
1988	Olympic Games	Seoul, South Korea	heats	4 × 400 m	3:30.21
1989	World Cup	Barcelona, Spain	2nd	100 m	11.23
1989	World Cup	Barcelona, Spain	2nd	200 m	22.82
1989	World Cup	Barcelona, Spain	—	4 × 100 m	DNF
1991	World Championships	Tokyo, Japan	7th	100 m	11.39
1991	World Championships	Tokyo, Japan	4th	4 × 100 m	42.77
1991	World Championships	Tokyo, Japan	5th	4 × 400 m	3:24.45
1991	All-Africa Games	Cairo, Egypt	1st	100 m	11.12
1992	Olympic Games	Barcelona, Spain	7th	100 m	11.15
1992	Olympic Games	Barcelona, Spain	semi-finals	200 m	22.60
1992	Olympic Games	Barcelona, Spain	3rd	4 × 100 m relay	42.81
1993	World Championships	Stuttgart, Germany	5th	100 m	11.05
1993	World Championships	Stuttgart, Germany	5th	200 m	22.32
1994	Commonwealth Games	Victoria, Canada	1st	100 m	11.06
1994	Commonwealth Games	Victoria, Canada	2nd	200 m	22.35
1994	Commonwealth Games	Victoria, Canada	1st	4 × 100 m relay	42.99
1994	World Cup	London, United Kingdom	3rd	100 m	11.52
1994	World Cup	London, United Kingdom	4th	200 m	22.82
1994	World Cup	London, United Kingdom	1st	4 × 100 m	42.92
1995	World Championships	Gothenburg, Sweden	7th	100 m	11.19
1995	World Championships	Gothenburg, Sweden	6th	200 m	22.71
1995	All-Africa Games	Harare, Zimbabwe	1st	100 m	11.18
1995	All-Africa Games	Harare, Zimbabwe	1st	200 m	22.75
1996	Olympic Games	Atlanta, United States	7th	100 m	11.13
1996	Olympic Games	Atlanta, United States	3rd	200 m	22.38
1996	Olympic Games	Atlanta, United States	5th	4 × 100 m	42.56
1998	World Cup	Johannesburg, South Africa	3rd	100 m	11.05
1998	World Cup	Johannesburg, South Africa	4th	4 × 100 m	42.91
2000	Olympic Games	Sydney, Australia	quarter-finals	100 m	11.40
2000	Olympic Games	Sydney, Australia	quarter-finals	200 m	23.03
2000	Olympic Games	Sydney, Australia	7th	4 × 100 m	44.05
2003	World Championships	Paris, France	semi-finals	100 m	11.35
2003	World Championships	Paris, France	semi-finals	200 m	22.97
2003	All-Africa Games	Abuja, Nigeria	1st	100 m	11.12
2003	All-Africa Games	Abuja, Nigeria	1st	200 m	23.09
2004	Olympic Games	Athens, Greece	quarter-finals	200 m	23.75

== Personal bests ==
- 100 metres – 10.97 (1993)
- 200 metres – 22.07 (1996)
- 400 metres – 54.21 (2000)

== See also ==
- List of sportspeople sanctioned for doping offences
- List of athletes with the most appearances at Olympic Games

Sporting positions
Preceded by (United States) Gwen Torrence	Women's 200 m Best Year Performance alongside (France) Marie-José Pérec; 1996	Succeeded by (United States) Marion Jones
Olympic Games
Preceded by Innocent Egbunike	Flagbearer for Nigeria; Atlanta 1996	Succeeded by Sunday Bada
Preceded by Sunday Bada	Flagbearer for Nigeria; Athens 2004	Succeeded by Bose Kaffo
