= Athletics at the 1985 Summer Universiade – Women's 4 × 400 metres relay =

The women's 4 × 400 metres relay event at the 1985 Summer Universiade was held at the Kobe Universiade Memorial Stadium in Kobe on 4 September 1986.

== Results ==
Rank	Nation	Athletes	Time	Notes
1st place, gold medalist(s)	Soviet Union	Margarita Navickaitė, Nadezhda Zvyagintseva, Yelena Korban, Tatyana Alekseyeva	3:25.96	
2nd place, silver medalist(s)	Canada	Charmaine Crooks, Esmie Lawrence, Camille Cato, Molly Killingbeck	3:29.06	
3rd place, bronze medalist(s)	United States	Susan Shurr, Sharon Dabney, Tanya McIntosh, Joetta Clark	3:30.41	
4	Nigeria	Rufina Uba, Airat Bakare, Kehinde Vaughan, Sadia Sowunmi	3:34.41	
5	Romania	Cristieana Cojocaru, Ella Kovacs, Nicoleta Căruțașu, Margareta Keszeg	3:36.88	
6	Japan	Rumiko Ito, Fumiko Ono, Mayumi Ito, Yoko Sato	3:49.29	
