= Athletics at the 1988 Summer Olympics – Women's 100 metres =

Women's 100 metres at the Games of the XXIV Olympiad
- Venue: Olympic Stadium
- Date: 24 September 1988 (heats, quarter-finals); 25 September 1988 (semi-finals, final)
- Competitors: 64 from 41 nations
- Winning time: 10.54

Medalists
1st place, gold medalist(s)		Florence Griffith-Joyner; United States
2nd place, silver medalist(s)		Evelyn Ashford; United States
3rd place, bronze medalist(s)		Heike Drechsler; East Germany

Official Video Highlights

The Women's 100 metres at the 1988 Summer Olympics in Seoul, South Korea had an entry list of 64 competitors, with eight qualifying heats (64), four second-round races (32) and two semifinals (16), before the final (8) took off on Sunday September 25, 1988.

== Records ==
These were the standing World and Olympic records (in seconds) prior to the 1988 Summer Olympics.

World record	10.49	(United States) Florence Griffith-Joyner	Indianapolis (USA)	July 16, 1988
Olympic record	10.97	(United States) Evelyn Ashford	Los Angeles (USA)	August 5, 1984

The following Olympic records were set during this competition.

Date	Athlete	Time	OR	WR
September 24, 1988	Florence Griffith-Joyner (USA)	10.88	OR	
September 24, 1988	Evelyn Ashford (USA)	10.88	=OR	
September 24, 1988	Florence Griffith-Joyner (USA)	10.62	OR	

== Results ==
=== Heats ===
==== Heat 1 ====
Wind +1.1

Rank	Athlete	Nation	Time	Notes
1	Anelia Nuneva	Bulgaria	11.09	Q
2	Grace Jackson	Jamaica	11.18	Q
3	Paula Dunn	Great Britain	11.39	Q
4	Tian Yumei	China	11.56	q
5	Voula Patoulidou	Greece	11.85	
6	Melvina Vulah	Liberia	12.16	
7	Félicite Bada	Benin	12.27	
8	Farida Kyakutewa	Uganda	12.32	

==== Heat 2 ====
Wind +0.4

Rank	Athlete	Nation	Time	Notes
1	Pauline Davis	Bahamas	11.20	Q
2	Nelli Cooman	Netherlands	11.22	Q
3	Marlies Göhr	East Germany	11.22	Q
4	Jolanta Janota	Poland	11.71	
5	Sandy Myers	Spain	11.86	
6	Méryem Oumezdi	Morocco	11.90	
7	Yvette Bonapart	Suriname	12.27	
8	Aminata Diarra	Mali	12.27	

==== Heat 3 ====
Wind +0.0

Rank	Athlete	Nation	Time	Notes
1	Gwen Torrence	United States	11.12	Q
2	Lyudmila Kondratyeva	Soviet Union	11.19	Q
3	Laurence Bily	France	11.34	Q
4	Amparo Caicedo	Colombia	11.59	q
5	Marisa Masullo	Italy	11.71	
6	Ewa Pisiewicz	Poland	11.84	
7	Ng Ka Yee	Hong Kong	12.18	
8	Jabou Jawo	The Gambia	12.27	

==== Heat 4 ====
Wind +1.1

Rank	Athlete	Nation	Time	Notes
1	Juliet Cuthbert	Jamaica	11.14	Q
2	Silke Möller	East Germany	11.27	Q
3	Els Vader	Netherlands	11.38	Q
4	Sabine Richter	West Germany	11.49	q
5	Françoise Leroux	France	11.58	q
6	Lydia de Vega	Philippines	11.67	
7	Guilhermina da Cruz	Angola	12.47	
8	Erin Tierney	Cook Islands	12.52	

==== Heat 5 ====
Wind +0.1

Rank	Athlete	Nation	Time	Notes
1	Evelyn Ashford	United States	11.10	Q
2	Marina Zhirova	Soviet Union	11.22	Q
3	Joanna Smolarek	Poland	11.43	Q
4	Andrea Thomas	West Germany	11.46	q
5	Julie Rocheleau	Canada	11.60	q
6	Gaily Dube	Zimbabwe	12.07	
7	Claudia Acerenza	Uruguay	12.11	
8	Judith Diankoléla-Missengué	Republic of the Congo	12.14	

==== Heat 6 ====
Wind +0.2

Rank	Athlete	Nation	Time	Notes
1	Natalia Pomoshchnikova	Soviet Union	11.11	Q
2	Heike Drechsler	East Germany	11.15	Q
3	Simmone Jacobs	Great Britain	11.56	Q
4	Angela Williams	Trinidad and Tobago	11.62	q
5	Liu Shaomei	China	11.66	
6	Lee Young-sook	South Korea	11.74	
7	Joyce Odhiambo	Kenya	11.90	
8	Mariama Ouiminga	Burkina Faso	12.62	

==== Heat 7 ====
Wind +1.0

Rank	Athlete	Nation	Time	Notes
1	Florence Griffith-Joyner	United States	10.88	Q, OR
2	Kerry Johnson	Australia	11.44	Q
3	Angela Bailey	Canada	11.61	Q
4	Patricia Girard	France	11.65	
5	Zhang Caihua	China	11.84	
6	Gisèle Ongollo	Gabon	11.85	
7	Chen Ya-li	Chinese Taipei	12.16	
8	Evelyn Farrell	Aruba	12.48	

==== Heat 8 ====
Wind +0.1

Rank	Athlete	Nation	Time	Notes
1	Merlene Ottey	Jamaica	11.03	Q
2	Ulrike Sarvari	West Germany	11.26	Q
3	Angella Issajenko	Canada	11.42	Q
4	Dinah Yankey	Ghana	11.64	q
5	Rossella Tarolo	Italy	11.86	
6	Helen Miles	Great Britain	11.88	
7	Olivette Daruhi	Vanuatu	13.00	
8	Mala Sakonhninhom	Laos	15.12	

=== Quarterfinals ===
==== Quarterfinal 1 ====
Wind +0.5

Rank	Athlete	Nation	Time	Notes
1	Heike Drechsler	East Germany	10.96	Q
2	Merlene Ottey	Jamaica	11.03	Q
3	Ulrike Sarvari	West Germany	11.16	Q
4	Pauline Davis	Bahamas	11.21	Q
5	Angela Bailey	Canada	11.29	
6	Els Vader	Netherlands	11.51	
7	Tian Yumei	China	11.55	
8	Françoise Leroux	France	11.75	

==== Quarterfinal 2 ====
Wind +1.6

Rank	Athlete	Nation	Time	Notes
1	Evelyn Ashford	United States	10.88	Q, =OR
2	Natalia Pomoishchnikova	Soviet Union	10.98	Q
3	Marlies Göhr	East Germany	10.99	Q
4	Nelli Cooman	Netherlands	11.08	Q
5	Angella Issajenko	Canada	11.27	
6	Joanna Smolarek	Poland	11.35	
7	Angela Williams	Trinidad and Tobago	11.45	
8	Amparo Caicedo	Colombia	11.65	

==== Quarterfinal 3 ====
Wind +1.0

Rank	Athlete	Nation	Time	Notes
1	Florence Griffith-Joyner	United States	10.62	Q, OR
2	Juliet Cuthbert	Jamaica	11.03	Q
3	Lyudmila Kondratyeva	Soviet Union	11.05	Q
4	Silke Möller	East Germany	11.10	Q
5	Simmone Jacobs	Great Britain	11.31	
6	Laurence Bily	France	11.35	
7	Andrea Thomas	West Germany	11.37	
8	Dinah Yankey	Ghana	11.63	

==== Quarterfinal 4 ====
Wind +0.0

Rank	Athlete	Nation	Time	Notes
1	Anelia Nuneva	Bulgaria	10.96	Q
2	Gwen Torrence	United States	10.99	Q
3	Grace Jackson	Jamaica	11.13	Q
4	Marina Zhirova	Soviet Union	11.14	Q
5	Paula Dunn	Great Britain	11.37	
6	Kerry Johnson	Australia	11.42	
7	Sabine Richter	West Germany	11.59	
8	Julie Rocheleau	Canada	11.75	

=== Semifinals ===
==== Semifinal 1 ====
Wind +0.5

Rank	Athlete	Nation	Time	Notes
1	Evelyn Ashford	United States	10.99	Q
2	Anelia Nuneva	Bulgaria	11.00	Q
3	Gwen Torrence	United States	11.02	Q
4	Juliet Cuthbert	Jamaica	11.10	Q
5	Silke Möller	East Germany	11.12	
6	Marlies Göhr	East Germany	11.13	
7	Lyudmila Kondratyeva	Soviet Union	11.21	
8	Marina Zhirova	Soviet Union	11.24	

==== Semifinal 2 ====
Wind +2.6

Rank	Athlete	Nation	Time	Notes
1	Florence Griffith-Joyner	United States	10.70	Q
2	Heike Drechsler	East Germany	10.91	Q
3	Natalia Pomoshchnikova	Soviet Union	11.03	Q
4	Grace Jackson	Jamaica	11.06	Q
5	Ulrike Sarvari	West Germany	11.12	
6	Pauline Davis	Bahamas	11.12	
7	Nelli Cooman	Netherlands	11.13	
—	Merlene Ottey	Jamaica	DNS	

=== Final ===
Wind +3.0

Rank	Lane	Athlete	Nation	Time
1st place, gold medalist(s)	3	Florence Griffith-Joyner	United States	10.54
2nd place, silver medalist(s)	6	Evelyn Ashford	United States	10.83
3rd place, bronze medalist(s)	5	Heike Drechsler	East Germany	10.85
4	8	Grace Jackson	Jamaica	10.97
5	1	Gwen Torrence	United States	10.97
6	2	Natalia Pomoshchnikova	Soviet Union	11.00
7	7	Juliet Cuthbert	Jamaica	11.26
8	4	Anelia Nuneva	Bulgaria	11.49

== See also ==
- 1987 Women's World Championships 100 metres (Rome)
- 1990 Women's European Championships 100 metres (Split)
- 1991 Women's World Championships 100 metres (Tokyo)
- 1992 Women's Olympic 100 metres (Barcelona)
