= Yoon Mi-kyong =

South Korean sprinter (born 1968)

Personal information
- Nationality: South Korean
- Born: October 18, 1968 (age 57)

Korean name
- Hangul: 윤미경
- Hanja: 尹美京
- RR: Yun Migyeong
- MR: Yun Migyŏng

Sport
- Sport: Sprinting
- Event: 4 × 100 metres relay

Yoon Mi-kyong (born October 18, 1968) is a South Korean sprinter. She competed in the women's 4 × 100 metres relay at the 1988 Summer Olympics.

Yoon attended Incheon Girls' Middle School (인천여자중학교), and represented her school at the National Youth Sports Festival (전국소년체육대회) in 1982, placing second in the girls' 100 metres. She went on to attend Inil Girls' High School (인일여자고등학교), also in Incheon. Her team's time of 45.59 in the women's 4 × 100 metres relay at the 1986 Asian Games remained the South Korean record for 23 years until it was broken at the 2009 Korean National Sports Festival (KNSF) by the North Gyeongsang Province team. She gained admission to Inha University, also in Incheon, and represented the school at the KNSF in 1989 and 1990. She returned to the Asian Games in 1990, but in the 200 metres event she was eliminated in the preliminary round. Her time of 24.51 in the women's 200 metres at the 1991 KNSF stood as the festival record until broken by Lee Yeon-kyung at the 2006 KNSF. She later represented Incheon City Hall at the National Assorted Track and Field Championships (전국종별육상경기선수권대회), coming in first place in the 200 metres in 1991 and the 100 metres in 1992.
