= Brian Morrison (athlete) =

Canadian sprinter

Personal information
- Born: 25 August 1968 (age 57) Calgary, Alberta, Canada

Sport
- Sport: Sprinting
- Event: 4 × 100 metres relay

Brian Morrison (born 25 August 1968) is a Canadian sprinter. He competed in the men's 4 × 100 metres relay at the 1988 Summer Olympics.
