= Xie Zhiling =

Chinese sprinter

Personal information
- Nationality: Chinese
- Born: 8 December 1963 (age 62)

Sport
- Sport: Sprinting
- Event: 200 metres
Medal record
Women's athletics
Representing China
Asian Championships
Bronze medal – third place	1987 Singapore	400 m

Xie Zhiling (born 8 December 1963) is a Chinese sprinter. She competed in the women's 200 metres at the 1988 Summer Olympics.
