= Falilat Ogunkoya =

Nigerian sprinter

Personal information
- Born: 5 December 1968 (age 57) Ode-Lemo, Ogun State, Nigeria
Medal record
Women's athletics
Representing Nigeria
Olympic Games
Silver medal – second place	1996 Atlanta	4 × 400 m relay
Bronze medal – third place	1996 Atlanta	400 m
World Indoor Championships
Silver medal – second place	1999 Maebashi	400 m
Summer Universiade
Bronze medal – third place	1987 Zagreb	4 x 100 m relay
African Championships
Gold medal – first place	1988 Annaba	200 m
Gold medal – first place	1989 Lagos	400 m
Gold medal – first place	1989 Lagos	4×400 m
Gold medal – first place	1998 Dakar	200 m
Gold medal – first place	1998 Dakar	400 m
Gold medal – first place	1998 Dakar	4×400 m
Silver medal – second place	1988 Annaba	100 m
Silver medal – second place	1989 Lagos	200 m
World Junior Championships
Gold medal – first place	1986 Athens	200 m
Bronze medal – third place	1986 Athens	4 × 100 m relay
All-Africa Games
Gold medal – first place	1999 Johannesburg	400 m
Silver medal – second place	1987 Nairobi	100 m
Silver medal – second place	1987 Nairobi	200 m
Silver medal – second place	1995 Harare	400 m

Falilat Ogunkoya-Osheku, née Falilat Ogunkoya, (born 5 December 1968) is a Nigerian former track and field athlete who holds the distinction of becoming the first Nigerian to win an individual track and field medal at the Olympic Games.

Ogunkoya has won a number of national championships, including a gold medal in 1996 in the 400 metres, gold in the 200 metres and 400 m in 1998, and gold again in 1999 and 2001 in the 400 m. At the 1987 All Africa Games in Nairobi she won the silver medal in the 200 m. In 1995 at the All Africa Games in Harare she won the silver in the 400 m, and at the 1999 Games in Johannesburg she won a gold medal in the 400 m.

At the 1996 Summer Olympics Ogunkoya won a bronze medal in the 400 m, behind Marie-José Pérec of France and Cathy Freeman of Australia, in a personal best and African record of 49.10, which is currently the twelfth fastest of all time. It marked the first time a Nigerian athlete won a medal in an individual track and field event.

== Achievements ==
Year	Competition	Venue	Position	Event	Notes
Representing Nigeria
1986	World Junior Championships	Athens, Greece	1st	200 m	23.11 (wind: +0.6 m/s)
1986	World Junior Championships	Athens, Greece	3rd	4 × 100 m relay	44.13
1987	All-Africa Games	Nairobi, Kenya	2nd	100 m	11.43
1987	All-Africa Games	Nairobi, Kenya	2nd	200 m	22.95
