= Olga Escalante =

Colombian sprinter

Personal information
- Nationality: Colombian
- Born: 26 September 1962 (age 63)

Sport
- Sport: Sprinting
- Event: 4 × 100 metres relay

Olga Escalante (born 26 September 1962) is a Colombian sprinter. She competed in the women's 4 × 100 metres relay at the 1988 Summer Olympics.
