= Esmie Lawrence =

Canadian sprinter

Personal information
- Nationality: Canadian
- Born: 19 November 1961 (age 64) Kingston, Jamaica

Sport
- Sport: Sprinting
- Events: 100 m, 200 m, 400 m
Medal record
Representing Canada
Commonwealth Games
Silver medal – second place	1986 Edinburgh	4x400m relay
Summer Universiade
Silver medal – second place	1985 Kobe	4x400m relay

Esmie Calkins (née Lawrence, born 19 November 1961) is a Canadian former sprinter. She won a silver medal in the 4 × 100 metres relay at the 1986 Commonwealth Games, and went on to run in the heats of the women's 4 × 400 metres relay at the 1988 Seoul Olympics.

== International competitions ==
Year	Competition	Venue	Position	Event	Notes
Representing Canada
1985	Universiade	Kobe, Japan	9th (sf)	100 m	11.64
1985	Universiade	Kobe, Japan	8th	200 m	24.05
1985	Universiade	Kobe, Japan	2nd	4 × 400 m relay	3:29.06
1985	World Cup	Canberra, Australia	4th	4 × 100 m relay	43.39
1986	Commonwealth Games	Edinburgh, United Kingdom	10th (h)	100 m	11.68
1986	Commonwealth Games	Edinburgh, United Kingdom	6th	200 m	23.87
1986	Commonwealth Games	Edinburgh, United Kingdom	2nd	4 × 100 m	43.83
1987	World Indoor Championships	Indianapolis, United States	6th	400 m	54.38
1988	Olympic Games	Seoul, South Korean	5th (h)	4 × 400 m	3:27.63
1989	Jeux de la Francophonie	Casablanca, Morocco	4th	100 m	11.37
1989	Jeux de la Francophonie	Casablanca, Morocco	6th	200 m	23.68
1990	Commonwealth Games	Auckland, New Zealand	16th (sf)	100 m	12.02
(#) Indicates overall position in qualifying heats (h) or semifinals (sf).
