= Liu Shaomei =

Chinese sprinter

Personal information
- Nationality: Chinese
- Born: 16 October 1963 (age 62)

Sport
- Sport: Sprinting
- Event: 100 metres

Liu Shaomei (born 16 October 1963) is a Chinese sprinter. She competed in the women's 100 metres at the 1988 Summer Olympics.
