= U Yang-ja =

South Korean sprinter

Personal information
- Nationality: South Korean
- Born: 4 March 1971 (age 55)

Sport
- Sport: Sprinting
- Event: 200 metres

U Yang-ja (born 4 March 1971) is a South Korean sprinter. She competed in the women's 200 metres at the 1988 Summer Olympics.
