= Tsvetanka Ilieva =

Bulgarian sprinter (born 1963)

Tsvetanka Ilieva (born 1 March 1963) is a retired Bulgarian sprinter who specialized in the 400 metres.

She finished eighth in the 4 x 400 metres relay at the 1983 World Championships, with teammates Rositsa Stamenova, Pepa Pavlova and Yuliana Marinova.

Her personal best time was 51.89 seconds, achieved in August 1987 in Stara Zagora.
