= Ng Ka Yee =

Hong Kong sprinter (born 1966)

Justina Ng
Personal information
- Nationality: Hong Kong
- Born: 9 September 1966 (age 59)

Sport
- Sport: Sprinting
- Events: 100 metres; 200 metres; 4 × 100 metres relay; 4 × 400 metres relay

Justina Ng Ka Yi (born 9 September 1966) is a Hong Kong sprinter. She competed in the women's 100 metres and women's 200 metres at the 1988 Summer Olympics. Her given name is sometimes transliterated as Ka Yee.

Ng competed in the 1986 Asian Games, making it to the semi-finals. She participated in the 100-metre dash and 200-metre dash in the 1990 Commonwealth Games. At the Arafura Sports Festival, she placed first in the 100-metre dash. Ng initially competed for the sports club Happy Valley AA and in early 1989 moved to the Watson's Athletic Club since she was an employee of Watsons. During her sports career, Ng set numerous Hong Kong records. Unus Alladin of the South China Morning Post called her "Hong Kong's most gifted female sprinter" and "Hongkong's introverted sprint queen" in 1988.

== Biography ==
Ng attended St. Catharine's School for Girls, where she competed in track. In June 1983, Ng participated in the sprint medley at the Duty Free Relay Carnival at Wanchai Stadium, setting a Hong Kong record and Hong Kong junior record with a time of 4 minutes and 31.11 seconds. In September 1983, Ng competed at the Hongkong Amateur Athletic Association Inter-Club Championships at Wanchai Stadium on the Concord Athletic Club team. She placed first with 12.39 seconds in the 100-metre dash and second in the 200-metre dash with 25.97 seconds. Later that month, she participated in the South China Athletic Association meet at Wanchai Stadium, where she placed first in the 100-metre dash with 12.26 seconds, appearing to set a Hong Kong record. However, because the wind gauge registered a wind of 2.25 metres per second at the time of the run, the record was pending approval.

In October 1983, Ng placed first in the 100-metre hurdle at the National Junior Championships held at Wanchai Stadium with 12.69 seconds. She was coached by Jubilee Sports Centre's Dennis Whitby. After taking part in a sprinting contest to promote anti-smoking, she competed in the 100-metre dash at the National Open Athletics Championships at Wanchai Stadium, placing first with a time of 12.72 seconds. She competed at the 200-metre dash at the 1983 Asian Athletics Championships held in November 1983, where she did not advance past the preliminary heat, having finished in fourth place. In June 1984, she contended in the women's sprint medley at the Hongkong Amateur Athletic Association relay carnival and broke a Hong Kong junior record. Ng took part in the Hongkong Amateur Athletic Association Junior National Championships held at Wanchai Stadium in August 1984. Representing Concord Athletic Club, Ng placed first in the 100-metre dash with 12.36 seconds and second in the 200-metre dash with 25.52 seconds. In July 1984, she took part in the Hongkong Amateur Athletic Association Inter Club Championship, placing first in the 100-metre dash with 12.58 seconds. Mike Field of the South China Morning Post called her Concord Athletic Club's "pocket-rocket". During the National Championships held at Wanchai Stadium in August 1984, she set a Hong Kong record by running 25.18 seconds in the 200-metre dash. She suffered a hamstring strain in September 1984 aso could not make the selection trials held by the Hongkong Amateur Athletic Association for the Friendship Inter-Cities Meeting in Manila. Ng received the Hongkong Amateur Athletic Association (HKAAA) Junior Athlete of the Year award in 1984.

Ng progressed to the sprinting semi-finals of the 1986 Asian Games. The South China Morning Post reported in 1990 that her showing there marked her top result. Ng competed in April 1987 in the Hongkong Amateur Athletic Association Inter-Club Championships at Wanchai Stadium, placing first in the 100-metre dash in 12.16 seconds. Ng was chosen to be the first runner in the women's 4 × 100 metres relay in the 1987 Asian Athletics Championships. Ng participated in August 1987 in the Hongkong Open Athletics Championships in the 100-metre dash held at Wan Chai Sports Ground, where she received first place with 12.23 seconds. She was chosen to compete in Rome for the women's 100 metres at the 1987 World Championships in Athletics in Rome. Eliminated in the semi-finals, she placed sixth with a time of 12.24 seconds. On 30 April 1988, the Hongkong Amateur Athletic Association (HKAAA) awarded Ng the Athlete of the Year Award alongside Leung Wing Kwong. Every person who voted supported her. In the previous year, she had set the 100-metre sprint Hong Kong record five times. At the Taiwan National Athletic competition held in May 1988, Ng received a gold medal in the 200-metre dash. With a time of 24.60 seconds, she set a Hong Kong record. She also took part in the 100-metre dash, where she set the Hong Kong record with 12.00 seconds and placed fourth after Lydia de Vega. She participated in August 1988 in an invitational commemorating Singapore Amateur Athletic Association's 50th anniversary. Ng placed second in the 100-metre dash with a time of 12.38 seconds and first in the 200-metre dash with a time of 25.03 seconds.

By September 1988, she had set four Hong Kong records in sprinting that year before she competed in the 1988 Summer Olympics. Unus Alladin of the South China Morning Post called her "Hong Kong's most gifted female sprinter" and "Hongkong's introverted sprint queen". Ng qualified for the Olympics for the 100-metre dash at the Kodak Olympic Trials at Wanchai Stadium in May 1988 by running 11.94 seconds and setting a Hong Kong record. Ng chose not to run in the 200-metre dash qualifier. She was the first female athlete from Hong Kong to take part in an Olympic sprinting event. Her Olympics coach was Lui Tze-ho. To prepare for the Olympics, she trained four times each week at Wan Chai Sports Ground and did strength training. She competed in the women's 100 metres and women's 200 metres at the 1988 Summer Olympics and was eliminated in the preliminary heats for both events.

In early 1989, Ng moved from Happy Valley AA to Watson's Athletic Club (WAC), which is run by the healthcare chain Watsons. The club employed five coaches to train the athletes. She was required to compete in Division II rather than with the top athletes in Division I since incoming teams must join at the league's lowest tier. As an employee of Watsons, she stated she needed to become a Watson's Athletic Club team member. Ng thought that although the division would have an absence of top challengers, the move to the new club was positive since WAC had stable funding and had the resources to arrange for athletes to train and take part in contests internationally. The club funded her to go an eight-day trip in 1989 to Taiwan to train for sprinting. In February 1989, Ng received the Coca-Cola Sports Awards which the South China Morning Post described as "the territory's highest sporting accolade". She competed in July 1989 in the Hongkong Amateur Athletic Association's Open contests in Wanchai Stadium. Ng placed first in the 200-metre dash with a time of 25.45 seconds.

Ng competed in the 1990 Commonwealth Games in January New Zealand in both the 100-metre dash and the 200-metre dash. In the 200-metre dash, she was eliminated in the first round after running in last place, clocking 25.13 seconds. Ng chose not to participate in the selection trials for the 1990 Asian Games in July that year. She opted out of participating in competitions throughout the remainder of the year, stating that she had not maintained a strong training regimen and aimed to resume training at the beginning of 1991. She had been working as a human resources clerk and went to lectures on four occasions each week for a year-long training program focused on management. Before the 1992 Summer Olympics, Ng had times below those determined as qualifying by the International Amateur Athletic Federation (IAAF). After taking nearly a year off from competing, in December 1992 Ng suffered a left hamstring strain at Wanchai Stadium in the final for the 100-metre dash at the Hongkong Amateur Athletics Association Open and was able to complete only 30 metres. In the qualifier for the event, she had a time of 12.60 seconds. During the Arafura Sports Festival held in Darwin, Northern Territory, Australia, in 1993, Ng represented the team Watson's Water Elite Programme. She was first place in the 200-metre dash with a time of 24.68 seconds which was 0.08 seconds shy of her Hong Kong record of 24.60. She ran the anchor leg for the 4 × 400 metres relay, winning third place.

In 2002, Ng was an employee of AS Watson. She participated in the Hutchison Whampoa's Annual Family and Sports Day, where she placed second in a race.
