= Erin Tierney =

Cook Islands sprinter

Erin Tierney (born June 29, 1970) is a sprint athlete, who competed for the Cook Islands.

Tierney was the first female competitor to represent the Cook Islands at the Olympics when she competed at the 1988 Summer Olympics in the 100 metres and the 200 metres, in both events she finished 8th in her heats, so didn't qualify for the next round. She also represented the Cook Islands at the 1990 Commonwealth Games.
