= Michelle Seymour =

New Zealand sprinter

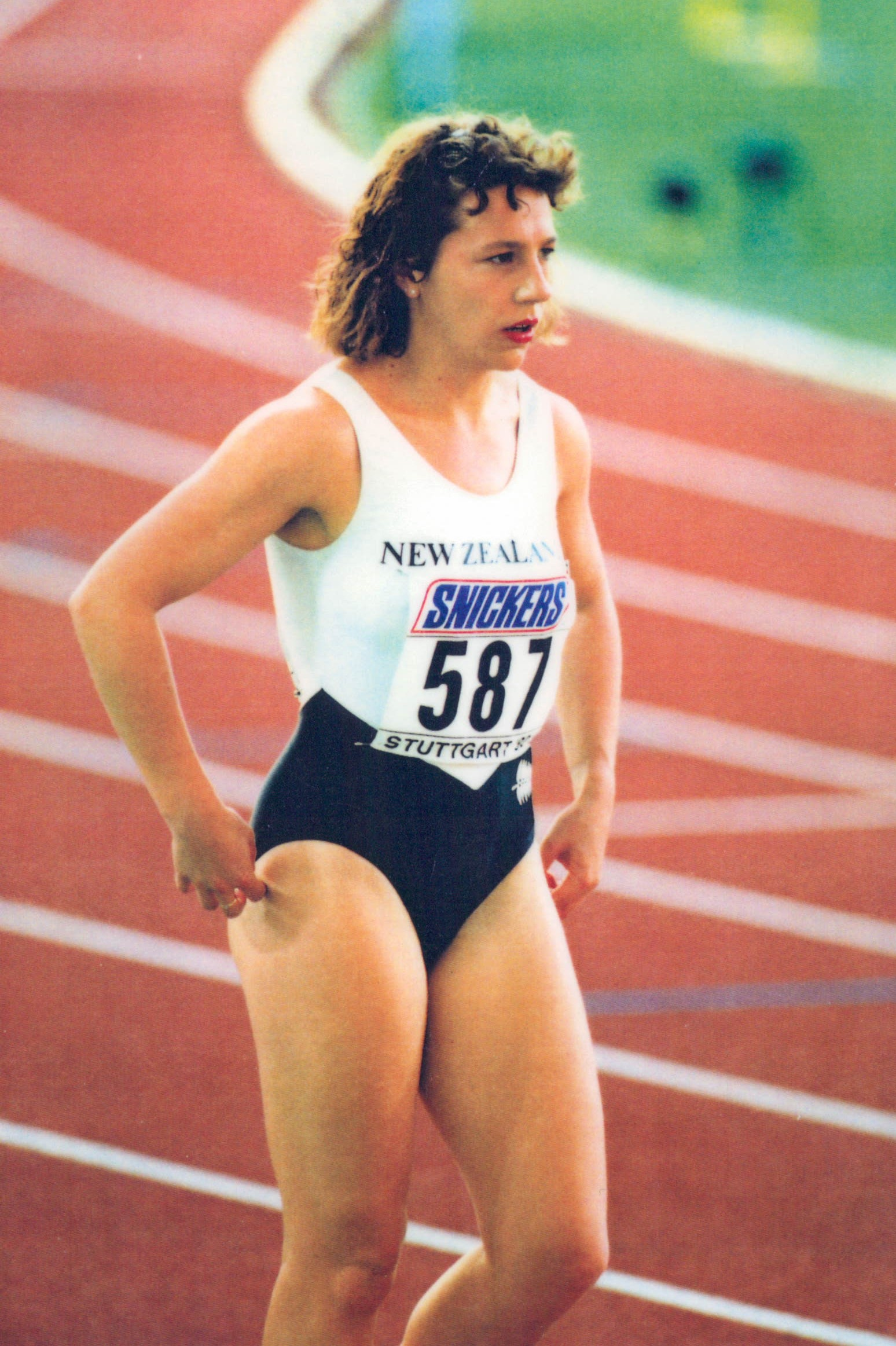
Seymour at the 1993 World Championships in Stuttgart

Michelle Karen Seymour (born 21 December 1965) is a former New Zealand sprinter who represented her country at the 1990 Commonwealth Games.

Seymour held the New Zealand national record for the women's 100 metres between 1993 and 2021.

In 1990, Seymour was awarded the New Zealand 1990 Commemoration Medal, and in 1993 she was named Māori Sportswoman of the Year. In 2018, she was inducted into the Paraparaumu College Hall of Fame.

== Personal bests ==
Distance	Time	Place	Date	Relay team
100 m	11.32	Melbourne	25 February 1993	
200 m	23.58	Portland	August 1994	
400 m	53.66	Wellington	March 1993	
4 × 100 m Relay	43.36	London	11 September 1994	M Dunstan, C Freeman, M Gainsford, M Seymour

== New Zealand national titles ==
Distance	Year (time)
100 m	1991 (12.01), 1992 (11.73), 1993 (11.58), 1994 (11.42)
200 m	1991 (23.85), 1992 (24.09), 1993 (23.90), 1994 (23.68)
400 m	1993 (53.66)

== New Zealand secondary school titles ==
Distance	Year
100 m	1981
200 m	1981

== Representation ==
Year	Competition	Place	Event	Representation
1989	World Cup	Barcelona	4 × 100 m relay squad	Oceania
1990	Commonwealth Games	Auckland	100 m, 200 m, 4 × 100 m relay	New Zealand
1991	World Championships	Tokyo	100 m	New Zealand
1992	World Cup	Havana	4 × 100 m relay	Oceania
1993	World Championships	Stuttgart	100 m	New Zealand
1994	Commonwealth Games	Victoria, BC	100m, 200m	New Zealand
1994	World Cup	London	4 × 100 m Relay (3rd), 100 m reserve	Oceania
