= Pauline Davis-Thompson =

Bahamian sprinter

Personal information
- Born: 9 July 1966 (age 59) Nassau, Bahamas
Medal record
Women's athletics
Representing Bahamas
Olympic Games
Gold medal – first place	2000 Sydney	4 × 100 m relay
Gold medal – first place	2000 Sydney	200 m
Silver medal – second place	1996 Atlanta	4 × 100 m relay
World Championships
Gold medal – first place	1999 Seville	4 × 100 m relay
Silver medal – second place	1995 Gothenburg	400 m
World Indoor Championships
Silver medal – second place	1995 Barcelona	200 m
Bronze medal – third place	1999 Maebashi	200 m
Central American and Caribbean Games
Gold medal – first place	1986 Santiago	100 m
Gold medal – first place	1986 Santiago	200 m
Commonwealth Games
Bronze medal – third place	1990 Auckland	100 m
Bronze medal – third place	1990 Auckland	200 m

Pauline Elaine Davis-Thompson, née Davis, (9 July 1966) is a former Bahamian sprinter. She competed at five Olympics, a rarity for a track and field athlete. She won her first medal at her fourth Olympics and her first gold medals at her fifth Olympics (Sydney 2000) at age 34 in the 4 × 100 m Relay and, after Marion Jones' belated disqualification nine years later, in the 200 m.

== Career ==
In 1984, she was awarded the Austin Sealy Trophy for the most outstanding athlete of the 1984 CARIFTA Games.

Her first high-profile success came in 1989 when she became the NCAA National Champion in the 200-meter dash while setting a collegiate national record as a member of the Alabama Crimson Tide team at the University of Alabama. Then in 1995, she won the silver medal in the 200 metres at the IAAF World Indoor Championships and won another silver, this time in the 400 metres, at the 1995 World Championships in Athletics.

She ran at the 1996 Atlanta Olympics the following year and although she narrowly missed out on a medal in the 400 m, she helped the Bahamian team to a silver medal in the 4 × 100 metres relay. In 1997 she made both the 400 m and 100 m relay finals but failed to win a medal in either event. She received her first World Championships gold medal two years later, in 1999, aiding the Bahamian relay team to victory.

She won a gold medal in both the 200 metres and the 4 × 100 m relay at the 2000 Summer Olympics in Sydney. She originally finished in second place in the women's 200 m behind Marion Jones, but on 5 October 2007, Jones admitted to taking performance-enhancing steroids and was stripped of the title. On 9 December 2009, Davis-Thompson was awarded the gold medal.

After her track career, she went into athletics administration, being elected to the IAAF council in 2007.

== Personal life ==
She's married to Jamaican Olympic hurdler (1992) Mark Thompson.

As a teenager, she had to constantly wear a sports bra to deal with her unoptimal physique at the time.

In 2022, Davis released a memoir, Running Sideways: The Olympic Champion Who Made Track and Field History. It won a 2023 International Book Award and the 2022 Cogan's Track and Field Book Award. In 2024, Davis signed a publishing deal to have Running Sideways translated and published within China.

== Personal bests ==
Event	Time	Date	Venue
100 m	10.97	21 July 2000	Nassau, Bahamas
200 m	22.27	28 September 2000	Sydney, Australia
400 m	49.28	29 July 1996	Atlanta, United States

== Achievements ==
Representing the Bahamas
Year	Competition	Venue	Position	Event	Notes
1982	CARIFTA Games (U-17)	Kingston, Jamaica	2nd	100 m	12.19
1982	CARIFTA Games (U-17)	Kingston, Jamaica	2nd	200 m	25.1
1982	Central American and Caribbean; Junior Championships (U-17)	Bridgetown, Barbados	1st	100 m	11.89
1982	Central American and Caribbean; Junior Championships (U-17)	Bridgetown, Barbados	1st	200 m	23.90
1982	Central American and Caribbean; Junior Championships (U-17)	Bridgetown, Barbados	1st	400 m	55.90
1982	Central American and Caribbean; Junior Championships (U-17)	Bridgetown, Barbados	1st	Long jump	5.22 m
1983	CARIFTA Games (U-20)	Fort-de-France, Martinique	2nd	100 m	11.69
1983	CARIFTA Games (U-20)	Fort-de-France, Martinique	1st	200 m	23.57
1983	Central American and Caribbean Championships	Havana, Cuba	2nd	100 m	11.60
1983	Central American and Caribbean Championships	Havana, Cuba	2nd	200 m	23.65 (w)
1983	Central American and Caribbean Championships	Havana, Cuba	1st	4 × 100 m relay	45.26
1986	Central American and Caribbean Games	Santiago, Dominican Republic	1st	100 m	11.51
1986	Central American and Caribbean Games	Santiago, Dominican Republic	1st	200 m	23.06
1986	Central American and Caribbean Games	Santiago, Dominican Republic	2nd	4 × 100 m relay	45.49
1987	Pan American Games	Indianapolis, United States	3rd	100 m	11.47
1987	Pan American Games	Indianapolis, United States	3rd	200 m	22.99
1989	Central American and Caribbean Championships	San Juan, Puerto Rico	1st	100 m	11.25
1989	Central American and Caribbean Championships	San Juan, Puerto Rico	2nd	4 × 100 m relay	46.50
1990	Commonwealth Games	Auckland, New Zealand	3rd	100 m	11.20 w (+4.4 m/s)
1990	Commonwealth Games	Auckland, New Zealand	3rd	200 m	23.15
1991	World Indoor Championships	Seville, Spain	5th	60 m	7.16
1991	World Championships	Tokyo, Japan	7th	200 m	22.90 (-2.4 m/s)
1993	IAAF Grand Prix Final	Stuttgart, Germany	8th	100 m	11.56
1994	IAAF Grand Prix Final	Paris, France	7th	400 m	51.52
1995	World Indoor Championships	Barcelona, Spain	2nd	200 m	22.68
1995	World Championships	Gothenborg, Sweden	2nd	400 m	49.96
1995	World Championships	Gothenborg, Sweden	4th	4 × 100 m relay	43.14
1996	Olympic Games	Atlanta, United States	4th	400 m	49.28
1996	Olympic Games	Atlanta, United States	2nd	4 × 100 m relay	42.14
1997	World Championships	Athens, Greece	7th	400 m	50.68
1997	World Championships	Athens, Greece	6th	4 × 100 m relay	42.77
1998	IAAF Grand Prix Final	Moscow, Russia	8th	400 m	53.83
1999	World Indoor Championships	Maebashi, Japan	3rd	200 m	22.70
1999	World Championships	Seville, Spain	1st	4 × 100 m relay	41.92
2000	Olympic Games	Sydney, Australia	1st	200 m	22.27 (+0.7 m/s)
2000	Olympic Games	Sydney, Australia	1st	4 × 100 m relay	41.95

Olympic Games
Preceded by Frank Rutherford	Flagbearer for Bahamas; Sydney 2000	Succeeded by Debbie Ferguson-McKenzie
