= Vivienne Spence =

Jamaican sprinter

Personal information
- Born: 22 January 1965 (age 61)

Sport
- Sport: Track and field
Medal record
Representing Jamaica
Pan American Games
| Bronze medal – third place | 1987 Indianapolis | 4x400m relay |
| Bronze medal – third place | 1991 Havana | 4x400m relay |

Vivienne Spence-Gardner (born 22 January 1965) is a retired female sprinter from Jamaica, who mainly competed in the women's 100 metres during her career. She is a one-time Olympian, making her only appearance in 1988 (Seoul, South Korea). Spence set her personal best (11.41 s) in 1988.

== Achievements ==
| Year | Competition | Venue | Position | Event | Notes |
Representing Jamaica
| 1991 | Pan American Games | Havana, Cuba | 3rd | 4 × 400 m relay | 3:28.33 |
| 1991 | Central American and Caribbean Championships | Xalapa, Mexico | 1st | 200 m | 24.03 |
| 1991 | Central American and Caribbean Championships | Xalapa, Mexico | 1st | 4 × 100 m relay | 44.54 |
