= Agnieszka Siwek =

Polish sprinter

Personal information
- Full name: Agnieszka Marzenna Siwek-Jechowska
- Born: 21 May 1962 (age 64) Warsaw, Poland
- Height: 163 cm (5 ft 4 in)
- Weight: 52 kg (115 lb)

Sport
- Sport: Track and field

Agnieszka Marzenna Siwek-Jechowska (born 21 May 1962) is a former female track and field sprinter from Poland, who represented her native country at the 1988 Summer Olympics in Seoul, South Korea. She set her personal best (11.36 seconds) in the women's 100 metres event in 1988.
