= Jolanta Janota =

Polish sprinter (born 1964)

Jolanta Janota-Marlec (born 6 July 1964 in Katowice) is a former female track and field sprinter from Poland, who represented her native country at the 1988 Summer Olympics in Seoul. She set her personal best (11.19) in the women's 100 metres event in 1986.
