= Françoise Leroux =

Personal information
- Nationality: France
- Born: 4 October 1961 (age 64) Limoges
- Height: 1.60 m (5 ft 3 in)

Sport
- Event: Sprint

Achievements and titles
- Regional finals: European Championships, European Indoor Championships

Françoise Leroux, born Philippe on 4 October 1961 at Limoges, is a former French athlete, who specialised in the sprints, and who ran for club CA Marignane SA. She competed in the women's 100 metres at the 1988 Summer Olympics.

== Prize list ==
=== International ===
International Awards
Date	Competition	Location	Result	Event
1986	European Championships	Stuttgart	4th	4 × 100 m
1987	World Championships	Rome	8th	4 × 100 m
1988	Olympic Games	Seoul	7th	4 × 100 m
1989	Games of La Francophonie	Casablanca	1st	4 × 100 m
1989	Games of La Francophonie	Casablanca	5th	100 m
