= Sallyanne Short =

Welsh sprinter (born 1968)

Personal information
- Nationality: British (Welsh)
- Born: 6 March 1968 (age 58) Newport, Wales
- Height: 160 cm (5 ft 3 in)
- Weight: 54 kg (119 lb)

Sport
- Sport: Athletics
- Event: sprints
- Club: Torfaen
Medal record
Women's athletics
Representing Wales
Commonwealth Games
Bronze medal – third place	1986 Edinburgh	4 x 100 m

Sallyanne Short (born 6 March 1968) is a Welsh former sprinter who competed in the 100 metres and 200 metres. She represented Great Britain in the 4 x 100 metres relay at the 1988 Olympic Games in Seoul.

== Biography ==
Short was born in Newport, Wales and began her international career in 1986. She represented Great Britain at the World Junior Championships in Athens and Wales at the Commonwealth Games in Edinburgh, where she won a bronze medal in the 4 × 100 m relay, her teammates were Sian Morris, Helen Miles and Carmen Smart.

Short finished third behind Paula Dunn in the 100 metres event at the 1987 WAAA Championships.

In 1988, she earned relay selection for the Seoul Olympics. The British quartet of Short, Bev Kinch, Simmone Jacobs and Paula Dunn, reached the semi-finals, running 43.50 to miss the final by just six hundredths of a second.

At her second Commonwealth Games in Auckland, January 1990, she reached the finals of both the 100 metres and 200 metres, finishing fifth in the 100 m in 11.41 and sixth in the 200 m in 23.35. In the summer, she won the UK National title at 100 metres and competed in the 200 m at the European Championships in Split. Also in 1990 she finished third behind Jennifer Stoute at the 1990 AAA Championships.

Short was unlucky to miss Olympic selection in 1992. At the Olympic trials in Birmingham, she was third in the 200 metres, but was the top UK athlete (Australian's Melinda Gainsford and Melissa Moore were 1st and 2nd). Short however, ran 23.24, just outside the qualifying standard of 23.20. Having been unable to attain this time in subsequent races, she did achieve the 100 m standard of 11.40, with 11.39 in Cwmbran. Unfortunately she achieved this just days after the selection deadline. The UK selectors decided not to send a 4 × 100 m squad to Barcelona. She retired in 1995.

Short held the Welsh 100 m record with her 11.39 from 1992 until 2022, when it was beaten by Hannah Brier. The record had previous been equalled by Briar and Elaine O'Neill. In 2024, Short and her bronze medal teammates were inducted into the Welsh Athletics Hall of Fame.

== Achievements ==
- UK 100 metres Champion (1990)
- 3 Times Welsh 100 metres Champion (1986,87,92)
- 7 Times Welsh 200 metres Champion (1986,87,88,89,90,92,94)

Year	Competition	Venue	Position	Event	Notes
Representing Great Britain / Wales
1986	World Junior Championships	Athens, Greece	14th (sf)	200 m	24.20 (wind: +0.5 m/s)
1986	World Junior Championships	Athens, Greece	6th	4 × 100 m	45.18
1986	Commonwealth Games	Edinburgh, Scotland	8th	100 m	11.74
1986	Commonwealth Games	Edinburgh, Scotland	11th (h)	200 m	24.06
1986	Commonwealth Games	Edinburgh, Scotland	3rd	4 × 100 m	45.37
1988	Olympic Games	Seoul, South Korea	semi-final	4 × 100 m	43.50
1990	Commonwealth Games	Auckland, New Zealand	5th	100 m	11.41
1990	Commonwealth Games	Auckland, New Zealand	6th	200 m	23.35
1990	European Championships	Split, Yugoslavia	18th (h)	200 m	23.83 (wind: -0.5 m/s)
