= Muriel Leroy =

French athlete

Personal information
- Nationality: France
- Born: 7 July 1968 (age 58) Ermont

Sport
- Events: Sprint, Long Jump

Muriel Leroy (born 7 July 1968 at Ermont) is a former French athlete, who specialised in the sprints and the Long jump.

== Biography ==
She won four French championship titles: the outdoor Long jump in 1991, and three indoor titles (the 200m in 1992 and the long jump in 1988 and 1989).

In 1987 she reached the final of the 4 × 100m relay in the Rome World Championships, taking the eighth and final race. She participated in the 1988 Olympics in Seoul and took seventh in the 4 × 100m relay alongside Françoise Leroux, Laurence Bily and Patricia Girard.

=== Prize list ===
- French Championships in Athletics:
  - winner of the long jump 1991
- French Indoor Athletics Championships :
  - winner of the 200 m in 1992
  - winner of the long jump in 1988 and 1989

=== Records ===
Personal records
Event	Performance	Location	Date
100 m	11 s 46		1988
200 m	23 s 19		1988
Long Jump	6.47 m		1994
