= Oliver Acii =

Ugandan sprinter

Oliver M. Acii (born 24 May 1970) is a retired Ugandan sprinter.

She competed in 60 metres at the 1987 World Indoor Championships, and in both 200 metres and 4 x 100 metres relay at the 1988 Olympic Games, but did not reach the final round in either event.

Her personal best times are 11.30 seconds in the 100 metres, achieved in January 1990 at the 1990 Commonwealth Games in Auckland; and 23.49 seconds in the 200 metres, achieved at the 1987 All-Africa Games in Nairobi.
