= Ivory Coast at the World Athletics Championships =

- Flag of Ivory Coast
- WA code: CIV
- Medals: Gold 0 Silver 4 Bronze 1 Total 5

World Athletics Championships appearances (overview)
- 1980; 1983; 1987; 1991; 1993; 1995; 1997; 1999; 2001; 2003; 2005; 2007; 2009; 2011; 2013; 2015; 2017; 2019; 2022; 2023; 2025

Ivory Coast has participated in every edition of the World Athletics Championships and its athletes have achieved 5 medals so far: 4 silvers and 1 bronze, all in the women's side. Murielle Ahouré won two silver medals in the women's 100 meters and 200 meters events in 2013, while Marie-Josée Ta Lou finished second in the 100 and 200 metres in 2017 and third in former in 2019.

== Medalists ==
Medal	Name	Year	Event
Silver	Murielle Ahouré	2013 Moscow	Women's 100 metres
Silver	Murielle Ahouré	2013 Moscow	Women's 200 metres
Silver	Marie-Josée Ta Lou	2017 London	Women's 100 metres
Silver	Marie-Josée Ta Lou	2017 London	Women's 200 metres
Bronze	Marie-Josée Ta Lou	2019 Doha	Women's 100 metres

=== By event ===
Event	Gold	Silver	Bronze	Total
100 metres	0	2	1	3
200 metres	0	2	0	2
Totals (2 entries)	0	4	1	5

=== By gender ===
Gender	Gold	Silver	Bronze	Total
Women	0	4	1	5
Men	0	0	0	0

== See also ==
- Ivory Coast at the Olympics
- Ivory Coast at the Paralympics
