= Ivory Coast at the 2025 World Athletics Championships =

- Flag of Ivory Coast
- WA code: CIV

in Tokyo, Japan 13 September 2025 – 21 September 2025
- Competitors: 5 (0 men and 5 women)
- Medals: Gold 0 Silver 0 Bronze 0 Total 0

World Athletics Championships appearances (overview)
- 1980; 1983; 1987; 1991; 1993; 1995; 1997; 1999; 2001; 2003; 2005; 2007; 2009; 2011; 2013; 2015; 2017; 2019; 2022; 2023; 2025

Ivory Coast competed at the 2025 World Athletics Championships in Tokyo, Japan, from 13 to 21 September 2025.

Ivory Coast entered 5 female athletes to the championships.

== Results ==
Key

- Q = Qualified for the next round
- q = Qualified for the next round as a fastest loser or, in field events, by position without achieving the qualifying target
- NR = National record
- PB = Personal best
- SB = Season best
- N/A = Round not applicable for the event

=== Women ===
Track and road events

Athlete	Event	Heat		Semifinal		Final	
Athlete	Event	Result	Rank	Result	Rank	Result	Rank
Maboundou Koné	100 metres	11.42	6	Did not advance			
Marie Josée Ta Lou-Smith	100 metres	11.05	1 Q	10.94	1 Q	11.04	7
Jessika Gbai	200 metres	22.81	3 Q	22.56 SB	5	Did not advance	
Maboundou Koné	200 metres	23.11	5	Did not advance			
Marie Josée Ta Lou-Smith	200 metres	22.39	2 Q	22.17 SB	2 Q	22.62	7
Dinedye Denis; Lou Yonan Chantal Djehi; Jessika Gbai; Maboundou Koné	4 × 100 metres relay	44.64	7	—N/a		Did not advance	
