= East Germany at the 1980 World Championships in Athletics =

- Flag of East Germany
- WA code: GDR

in Sittard, Netherlands 14–26 August 2022
- Competitors: 3 (3 women) in 1 event
- Medals Ranked 1st: Gold 1 Silver 1 Bronze 1 Total 3

World Championships in Athletics appearances
- 1976; 1980; 1983; 1987

East Germany competed at the 1980 World Championships in Athletics in Sittard, Netherlands, from 14 to 16 August 1980.

== Medalists ==
Medal	Athlete	Event	Date
Gold	Bärbel Broschat	Women's 400 metres hurdles	16 August
Silver	Ellen Neumann	Women's 400 metres hurdles	16 August
Bronze	Petra Pfaff	Women's 400 metres hurdles	16 August

== Results ==
Key

- Q = Qualified for the next round
- q = Qualified for the next round as a fastest loser or, in field events, by position without achieving the qualifying target
- NR = National record
- PB = Personal best
- SB = Season best
- N/A = Round not applicable for the event

Athlete	Event	Heat		Semifinal		Final	
Athlete	Event	Result	Rank	Result	Rank	Result	Rank
Bärbel Broschat	Women's 400 metres hurdles	56.13	1 Q	55.89	1 Q	54.55 CR, PB	1st place, gold medalist(s)
Ellen Neumann	Women's 400 metres hurdles	56.35	2 Q	55.89	1 Q	54.56	2nd place, silver medalist(s)
Petra Pfaff	Women's 400 metres hurdles	57.92	5 Q	56.78	4 Q	55.84	3rd place, bronze medalist(s)
