= Denmark at the 2025 World Athletics Championships =

- Flag of Denmark
- WA code: DEN

in Tokyo, Japan 13 September 2025 – 21 September 2025
- Competitors: 9 (3 men and 6 women)
- Medals: Gold 0 Silver 0 Bronze 0 Total 0

World Athletics Championships appearances
- 1980; 1983; 1987; 1991; 1993; 1995; 1997; 1999; 2001; 2003; 2005; 2007; 2009; 2011; 2013; 2015; 2017; 2019; 2022; 2023; 2025

Denmark competed at the 2025 World Athletics Championships in Tokyo, Japan, from 13 to 21 September 2025.

== Results ==
Denmark entered 9 athletes to the championships: 6 women and 3 men.

Key

- Q = Qualified for the next round
- q = Qualified for the next round as a fastest loser or, in field events, by position without achieving the qualifying target
- NR = National record
- PB = Personal best
- SB = Season best
- N/A = Round not applicable for the event

=== Men ===
Track and road events

Athlete	Event	Heat		Semifinal		Final	
Athlete	Event	Result	Rank	Result	Rank	Result	Rank
Simon Hansen	100 metres	10.22	5	Did not advance			
Kristian Uldbjerg Hansen	1500 metres	3:47.58	14	Did not advance			
Jacob Sommer Simonsen	Marathon	—N/a				2:15:31 SB	29

=== Women ===
Track and road events

Athlete	Event	Heat		Semifinal		Final	
Athlete	Event	Result	Rank	Result	Rank	Result	Rank
Sofia Thøgersen	1500 metres	4:08.48 SB	11	Did not advance			
Karen Ehrenreich	Marathon	—N/a				2:57:07	57
Sara Schou Kristensen	Marathon	—N/a				2:42:34 SB	43

Field events

Athlete	Event	Qualification		Final	
Athlete	Event	Distance	Position	Distance	Position
Janne Nielsen	Triple jump	13.53	29	Did not advance	
Lisa Brix Pedersen	Discus throw	58.52	25	Did not advance	
Katrine Koch Jacobsen	Hammer throw	72.00	8 q	71.59	8
