= Sweden at the World Athletics Championships =

- WA code: SWE
- National federation: Svenska Friidrottsförbundet
- Website: www.friidrott.se
- Medals Ranked 19th: Gold 12 Silver 7 Bronze 8 Total 27

World Athletics Championships appearances (overview)
- 1976; 1980; 1983; 1987; 1991; 1993; 1995; 1997; 1999; 2001; 2003; 2005; 2007; 2009; 2011; 2013; 2015; 2017; 2019; 2022; 2023; 2025

Sweden has participated in all World Athletics Championships since the beginning in 1983. Sweden's second largest city, Gothenburg, hosted the event in 1995.

== Medalists ==
Medal	Name	Year	Event
Silver	Karoline Nemetz	1980 Sittard	Women's 3000 metres
Gold	Patrik Sjöberg	1987 Rome	Men's high jump
Silver	Madelein Svensson	1991 Tokyo	Women's 10 km walk
Gold	Ludmila Engquist	1997 Athens	Women's 100 m hurdles
Bronze	Ludmila Engquist	1999 Seville	Women's 100 m hurdles
Silver	Christian Olsson	2001 Edmonton	Men's triple jump
Bronze	Kajsa Bergqvist	2001 Edmonton	Women's high jump
Gold	Christian Olsson	2003 Saint-Denis	Men's triple jump
Gold	Carolina Klüft	2003 Saint-Denis	Women's heptathlon
Silver	Stefan Holm	2003 Saint-Denis	Men's high jump
Bronze	Patrik Kristiansson	2003 Saint-Denis	Men's pole vault
Bronze	Kajsa Bergqvist	2003 Saint-Denis	Women's high jump
Gold	Carolina Klüft	2005 Helsinki	Women's heptathlon
Bronze	Emma Green	2005 Helsinki	Women's high jump
Gold	Kajsa Bergqvist	2005 Helsinki	Women's high jump
Gold	Carolina Klüft	2007 Osaka	Women's heptathlon
Gold	Abeba Aregawi	2013 Moscow	Women's 1500 metres
Silver	Daniel Ståhl	2017 London	Men's discus throw
Gold	Daniel Ståhl	2019 Doha	Men's discus throw
Silver	Armand Duplantis	2019 Doha	Men's pole vault
Bronze	Perseus Karlström	2019 Doha	Men's 20 km walk
Bronze	Perseus Karlström	2022 Eugene	Men's 20 km walk
Gold	Armand Duplantis	2022 Eugene	Men's pole vault
Bronze	Perseus Karlström	2022 Eugene	Men's 35 km walk
Silver	Perseus Karlström	2023 Budapest	Men's 20 km walk
Gold	Daniel Ståhl	2023 Budapest	Men's discus throw
Gold	Armand Duplantis	2023 Budapest	Men's pole vault

== Medal tables ==
=== By championships ===
Games	Gold	Silver	Bronze	Total
1976 Malmö	0	0	0	0
1980 Sittard	0	1	0	1
1983 Helsinki	0	0	0	0
1987 Rome	1	0	0	1
1991 Tokyo	0	1	0	1
1993 Stuttgart	0	0	0	0
1995 Gothenburg	0	0	0	0
1997 Athens	1	0	0	1
1999 Seville	0	0	1	1
2001 Edmonton	0	1	1	2
2003 Saint-Denis	2	1	2	5
2005 Helsinki	2	0	1	3
2007 Osaka	1	0	0	1
2009 Berlin	0	0	0	0
2011 Daegu	0	0	0	0
2013 Moscow	1	0	0	1
2015 Beijing	0	0	0	0
2017 London	0	1	0	1
2019 Doha	1	1	1	3
2022 Eugene	1	0	2	3
2023 Budapest	2	1	0	3
2025 Tokyo	2	0	1	3
Totals (22 entries)	14	7	9	30

=== By event ===
Event	Gold	Silver	Bronze	Total
Jumping	5	3	4	12
Combined events	3	0	0	3
Throwing	2	1	0	3
Middle-distance running	1	1	0	2
Hurdling	1	0	1	2
Racewalking	0	2	3	5
Totals (6 entries)	12	7	8	27

=== By gender ===
Gender	Gold	Silver	Bronze	Total
Men	6	5	4	15
Women	6	2	4	12
