= Sweden at the 1980 World Championships in Athletics =

- Flag of Sweden
- WA code: SWE

in Sittard, Netherlands 14 August 1980 – 16 August 1980
- Competitors: 3 (3 women) in 2 events
- Medals Ranked 3rd: Gold 0 Silver 1 Bronze 0 Total 1

World Championships in Athletics appearances (overview)
- 1976; 1980; 1983; 1987; 1991; 1993; 1995; 1997; 1999; 2001; 2003; 2005; 2007; 2009; 2011; 2013; 2015; 2017; 2019; 2022; 2023; 2025

Sweden competed at the 1980 World Championships in Athletics in Sittard, Netherlands, from 14 to 16 August 1980.

== Medalists ==
Medal	Athlete	Event	Date
Silver	Karoline Nemetz	Women's 3000 metres	16 August

== Results ==
Key

- Q = Qualified for the next round
- q = Qualified for the next round as a fastest loser or, in field events, by position without achieving the qualifying target
- NR = National record
- PB = Personal best
- SB = Season best
- N/A = Round not applicable for the event

Athlete	Event	Heat		Semifinal		Final	
Athlete	Event	Result	Rank	Result	Rank	Result	Rank
Eva Ernström	Women's 3000 metres	9:06.5	9 Q	—		9:07.7	8
Karoline Nemetz	Women's 3000 metres	9:04.9	4 Q	—		8:50.22	2nd place, silver medalist(s)
Kirsi Ulvinen	Women's 400 metres hurdles	Disqualified		Did not advance			
