= Argentina at the 2009 World Championships in Athletics =

- WA code: ARG

in Berlin
- Competitors: 6 (4 men, 2 women)
- Medals: Gold 0 Silver 0 Bronze 0 Total 0

World Championships in Athletics appearances
- 1980; 1983; 1987; 1991; 1993; 1995; 1997; 1999; 2001; 2003; 2005; 2007; 2009; 2011; 2013; 2015; 2017; 2019; 2022; 2023; 2025

Argentina fielded six competitors at the 2009 World Championships in Athletics in Berlin.

== Team selection ==
Track and road events

Event	Athletes	
Event	Men	Women
20 km race walk	Juan Manuel Cano	

Field and combined events

Event	Athletes	
Event	Men	Women
Shot Put	Germán Lauro	
Discus throw	Jorge Balliengo; Germán Lauro	Rocío Comba
Hammer throw	Juan Ignacio Cerra	Jennifer Dahlgren

== Results ==
=== Men ===
Track and road events

Event	Athletes	Final	
Event	Athletes	Result	Rank
20 km walk	Juan Manuel Cano	1:29:20 SB	40

Field and combined events

Event	Athletes	Qualification		Final	
Event	Athletes	Result	Rank	Result	Rank
Shot put	Germán Lauro	NM	-	did not advance	
Discus throw	Jorge Balliengo	59.19	23	did not advance	
Discus throw	Germán Lauro	57.88	28	did not advance	
Hammer throw	Juan Ignacio Cerra	69.37	30	did not advance	

=== Women ===
Field and combined events

Event	Athletes	Qualification		Final	
Event	Athletes	Result	Rank	Result	Rank
Discus throw	Rocío Comba	54.69	30	did not advance	
Hammer throw	Jennifer Dahlgren	68.90	17	did not advance	
