= Norway at the World Athletics Championships =

Highlights, in listed form, of Norway's participation in World Athletics Championships

- WA code: NOR
- National federation: Norges Friidrettsforbund
- Website: www.friidrett.no
- Medals Ranked 21st: Gold 12 Silver 6 Bronze 6 Total 24

World Athletics Championships appearances (overview)
- 1980; 1983; 1987; 1991; 1993; 1995; 1997; 1999; 2001; 2003; 2005; 2007; 2009; 2011; 2013; 2015; 2017; 2019; 2022; 2023; 2025

Norway has participated in every edition of the World Athletics Championships since 1980.

== Medalists ==
| Medal | Name | Year | Event |
|---|---|---|---|
| Bronze | Ingrid Kristiansen | 1980 Sittard | Women's 3000 metres |
| Gold | Grete Waitz | 1983 Helsinki | Women's marathon |
| Gold | Ingrid Kristiansen | 1987 Rome | Women's 10,000 metres |
| Silver | Lars Arvid Nilsen | 1991 Tokyo | Men's shot put |
| Gold | Trine Hattestad | 1993 Stuttgart | Women's javelin throw |
| Bronze | Vebjørn Rodal | 1995 Gothenburg | Men's 800 metres |
| Gold | Hanne Haugland | 1997 Athens | Women's high jump |
| Gold | Trine Hattestad | 1997 Athens | Women's javelin throw |
| Bronze | Trine Hattestad | 1999 Seville | Women's javelin throw |
| Silver | Andreas Thorkildsen | 2005 Helsinki | Men's javelin throw |
| Silver | Andreas Thorkildsen | 2007 Osaka | Men's javelin throw |
| Gold | Andreas Thorkildsen | 2009 Berlin | Men's javelin throw |
| Gold | Trond Nymark | 2009 Berlin | Men's 50 kilometres walk |
| Silver | Andreas Thorkildsen | 2011 Daegu | Men's javelin throw |
| Gold | Karsten Warholm | 2017 London | Men's 400 metres hurdles |
| Bronze | Filip Ingebrigtsen | 2017 London | Men's 1500 metres |
| Gold | Karsten Warholm | 2019 Doha | Men's 400 metres hurdles |
| Gold | Jakob Ingebrigtsen | 2022 Eugene | Men's 5000 metres |
| Silver | Jakob Ingebrigtsen | 2022 Eugene | Men's 1500 metres |
| Bronze | Eivind Henriksen | 2022 Eugene | Men's Hammer throw |
| Gold | Karsten Warholm | 2023 Budapest | Men's 400 metres hurdles |
| Gold | Jakob Ingebrigtsen | 2023 Budapest | Men's 5000 metres |
| Silver | Jakob Ingebrigtsen | 2023 Budapest | Men's 1500 metres |
| Bronze | Narve Gilje Nordås | 2023 Budapest | Men's 1500 metres |

== Medal tables ==
=== By championships ===
| Games | Gold | Silver | Bronze | Total |
|---|---|---|---|---|
| 1976 Malmö | 0 | 0 | 0 | 0 |
| 1980 Sittard | 0 | 0 | 1 | 1 |
| 1983 Helsinki | 1 | 0 | 0 | 1 |
| 1987 Rome | 1 | 0 | 0 | 1 |
| 1991 Tokyo | 0 | 1 | 0 | 1 |
| 1993 Stuttgart | 1 | 0 | 0 | 1 |
| 1995 Gothenburg | 0 | 0 | 1 | 1 |
| 1997 Athens | 2 | 0 | 0 | 2 |
| 1999 Seville | 0 | 0 | 1 | 1 |
| 2001 Edmonton | 0 | 0 | 0 | 0 |
| 2003 Saint-Denis | 0 | 0 | 0 | 0 |
| 2005 Helsinki | 0 | 1 | 0 | 1 |
| 2007 Osaka | 0 | 1 | 0 | 1 |
| 2009 Berlin | 2 | 0 | 0 | 2 |
| 2011 Daegu | 0 | 1 | 0 | 1 |
| 2013 Moscow | 0 | 0 | 0 | 0 |
| 2015 Beijing | 0 | 0 | 0 | 0 |
| 2017 London | 1 | 0 | 1 | 2 |
| 2019 Doha | 1 | 0 | 0 | 1 |
| 2022 Eugene | 1 | 1 | 1 | 3 |
| 2023 Budapest | 2 | 1 | 1 | 4 |
| Totals (21 entries) | 12 | 6 | 6 | 24 |

=== By event ===
| Event | Gold | Silver | Bronze | Total |
|---|---|---|---|---|
| Throwing | 3 | 4 | 2 | 9 |
| Hurdling | 3 | 0 | 0 | 3 |
| Middle-distance running | 2 | 2 | 4 | 8 |
| Long-distance running | 2 | 0 | 0 | 2 |
| Jumping | 1 | 0 | 0 | 1 |
| Racewalking | 1 | 0 | 0 | 1 |
| Totals (6 entries) | 12 | 6 | 6 | 24 |

=== By gender ===
| Gender | Gold | Silver | Bronze | Total |
|---|---|---|---|---|
| Men | 7 | 6 | 4 | 17 |
| Women | 5 | 0 | 2 | 7 |
