= Chinese Taipei at the 2017 World Championships in Athletics =

- WA code: TPE

in London, United Kingdom
- Competitors: 2
- Medals: Gold 0 Silver 0 Bronze 0 Total 0

World Championships in Athletics appearances
- 1980; 1983; 1987; 1991; 1993; 1995; 1997; 1999; 2001; 2003; 2005; 2007; 2009; 2011; 2013; 2015; 2017; 2019; 2022; 2023; 2025

Chinese Taipei competed at the 2017 World Championships in Athletics in London, United Kingdom, 4–13 August 2017.

== Results ==
(q = qualified, NM = no mark, SB = season best)

=== Men ===
Field events

Athlete	Event	Qualification		Final	
Athlete	Event	Distance	Position	Distance	Position
Cheng Chao-Tsun	Javelin throw	77.87	22	Did not advance	

=== Women ===
Track and road events

Athlete	Event	Heat		Semifinal		Final	
Athlete	Event	Result	Rank	Result	Rank	Result	Rank
Hsieh Chien-ho	Marathon	—N/a				DNF	–
