= Argentina at the 2017 World Championships in Athletics =

- Flag of Argentina
- WA code: ARG
- National federation: Argentine Athletics Confederation
- Website: cada-atletismo.org (in Spanish)

in London, United Kingdom 4–13 August 2017
- Competitors: 10 (7 men and 3 women) in 10 events
- Medals: Gold 0 Silver 0 Bronze 0 Total 0

World Championships in Athletics appearances
- 1980; 1983; 1987; 1991; 1993; 1995; 1997; 1999; 2001; 2003; 2005; 2007; 2009; 2011; 2013; 2015; 2017; 2019; 2022; 2023; 2025

Argentina competed at the 2017 World Championships in Athletics in London, United Kingdom, 4–13 August 2017.

== Results ==
=== Men ===
Track and road events

Athlete	Event	Heat		Semifinal		Final	
Athlete	Event	Result	Rank	Result	Rank	Result	Rank
Leandro Paris	800 metres	1:47.09 PB	25	Did not advance			
Federico Bruno	1500 metres	3:43.16	19	Did not advance			
Mariano Mastromarino	Marathon	—N/a				DNF	–
Guillermo Ruggeri	400 metres hurdles	49.69 NR	15 Q	DQ	–	Did not advance	
Juan Manuel Cano	20 kilometres walk	—N/a				1:24:49	46

Field events

Athlete	Event	Qualification		Final	
Athlete	Event	Distance	Position	Distance	Position
Germán Chiaraviglio	Pole vault	5.45	20	Did not advance	
Braian Toledo	Javelin throw	75.29	28	Did not advance	

=== Women ===
Track and road events

Athlete	Event	Heat		Semifinal		Final	
Athlete	Event	Result	Rank	Result	Rank	Result	Rank
Rosa Godoy	Marathon	—N/a				2:49:30 SB	62
Belén Casetta	3000 metres steeplechase	9:35.78 AR	12 q	—N/a		9:25.99 AR	11

Field events

Athlete	Event	Qualification		Final	
Athlete	Event	Distance	Position	Distance	Position
Jennifer Dahlgren	Hammer throw	NM	–	Did not advance	
