= Argentina at the 2023 World Athletics Championships =

- Flag of Argentina
- WA code: ARG

in Budapest, Hungary 19 August 2023 – 27 August 2023
- Competitors: 10 (9 men and 1 woman)
- Medals: Gold 0 Silver 0 Bronze 0 Total 0

World Athletics Championships appearances
- 1980; 1983; 1987; 1991; 1993; 1995; 1997; 1999; 2001; 2003; 2005; 2007; 2009; 2011; 2013; 2015; 2017; 2019; 2022; 2023; 2025

Argentina competed at the 2023 World Athletics Championships in Budapest, Hungary, from 19 to 27 August 2023.

== Results ==
Argentina entered 10 athletes.

Key

- Q = Qualified for the next round
- q = Qualified for the next round as a fastest loser or, in field events, by position without achieving the qualifying target
- NR = National record
- PB = Personal best
- SB = Season best
- N/A = Round not applicable for the event

=== Men ===
Track and road events

| Athlete | Event | Heat | | Semifinal | | Final | |
| Athlete | Event | Result | Rank | Result | Rank | Result | Rank |
|---|---|---|---|---|---|---|---|
| Elián Larregina | 400 metres | 45.42 | 5 | Did not advance | | | |
| Diego Lacamoire | 1500 metres | 3:38.92 PB | 14 | Did not advance | | | |
| Julián Molina | 3000 metres steeplechase | 8.46.44 | 13 | — | | Did not advance | |
| Joaquín Arbe | Marathon | — | | | | DNF | |
| Juan Manuel Cano | 20 kilometres walk | — | | | | 1:27:29 | 45 |

Field events

| Athlete | Event | Qualification | | Final | |
| Athlete | Event | Distance | Position | Distance | Position |
|---|---|---|---|---|---|
| Carlos Layoy | High jump | NM | | Did not advance | |
| Germán Chiaraviglio | Pole vault | 5.35 | =22 | Did not advance | |
| Nazareno Sasia | Shot put | 19.51 | 26 | Did not advance | |
| Joaquín Gómez | Hammer throw | 72.77 | 21 | Did not advance | |

=== Women ===
Track and road events

| Athlete | Event | Heat | | Semifinal | | Final | |
| Athlete | Event | Result | Rank | Result | Rank | Result | Rank |
|---|---|---|---|---|---|---|---|
| Fedra Luna | 1500 metres | 4:19.00 | 13 | Did not advance | | | |
| Fedra Luna | 5000 metres | DNF | | — | | Did not advance | |
