= West Germany at the 1980 World Championships in Athletics =

- Flag of West Germany
- WA code: FRG

in Sittard, Netherlands 14–26 August 2022
- Competitors: 3 (3 women) in 2 events
- Medals Ranked 2nd: Gold 1 Silver 0 Bronze 0 Total 1

World Championships in Athletics appearances
- 1976; 1980; 1983; 1987

West Germany competed at the 1980 World Championships in Athletics in Sittard, Netherlands, from 14 to 16 August 1980.

== Medalists ==
Medal	Athlete	Event	Date
Gold	Birgit Friedmann	Women's 3000 metres	16 August

== Results ==
Key

- Q = Qualified for the next round
- q = Qualified for the next round as a fastest loser or, in field events, by position without achieving the qualifying target
- NR = National record
- PB = Personal best
- SB = Season best
- N/A = Round not applicable for the event

Athlete	Event	Heat		Semifinal		Final	
Athlete	Event	Result	Rank	Result	Rank	Result	Rank
Simone Büngener	Women's 400 metres hurdles	59.98	15 q	59.11	13	Did not advance	
Birgit Friedmann	Women's 3000 metres	9:04.7	1 Q	—N/a		8:48.05 CR, PB	1st place, gold medalist(s)
Charlotte Teske	Women's 3000 metres	9:06.1	7 Q	—N/a		9:04.3	7
