= Argentina at the 2015 World Championships in Athletics =

- WA code: ARG
- Website: cada-atletismo.org

in Beijing
- Competitors: 6
- Medals: Gold 0 Silver 0 Bronze 0 Total 0

World Championships in Athletics appearances
- 1980; 1983; 1987; 1991; 1993; 1995; 1997; 1999; 2001; 2003; 2005; 2007; 2009; 2011; 2013; 2015; 2017; 2019; 2022; 2023; 2025

Argentina competed at the 2015 World Championships in Athletics in Beijing, China, from August 22 to 30, 2015.

== Results ==
(q – qualified, NM – no mark, SB – season best)

=== Men ===
Track and road events

Athlete	Event	Heat		Semifinal		Final	
Athlete	Event	Result	Rank	Result	Rank	Result	Rank
Juan Manuel Cano	20 kilometres walk	—N/a				1:27:10	42

Field events

Athlete	Event	Qualification		Final	
Athlete	Event	Distance	Position	Distance	Position
Germán Chiaraviglio	Pole vault	5.70	13 Q	5.65	9
Germán Lauro	Shot put	20.64	4 Q	19.70	9
Braian Toledo	Javelin throw	83.32 NR	6 Q	80.27	10

=== Women ===
Field events

Athlete	Event	Qualification		Final	
Athlete	Event	Distance	Position	Distance	Position
Rocío Comba	Discus throw	56.11	28	did not advance	
Jennifer Dahlgren	Hammer throw	67.68	21	did not advance	
