= Argentina at the 2022 World Athletics Championships =

- Flag of Argentina
- WA code: ARG
- National federation: Argentine Athletics Confederation

in Eugene, United States 15–24 July 2022
- Competitors: 9 (6 men and 3 women) in 8 events

World Athletics Championships appearances
- 1980; 1983; 1987; 1991; 1993; 1995; 1997; 1999; 2001; 2003; 2005; 2007; 2009; 2011; 2013; 2015; 2017; 2019; 2022; 2023; 2025

Argentina competed at the 2022 World Athletics Championships in Eugene, United States, from 15 to 24 July 2022. Argentina has entered 11 athletes.

== Entrants ==
- including alternates

=== Men ===
Track and road events

Athlete	Event	Heat		Semi-final		Final	
Athlete	Event	Result	Rank	Result	Rank	Result	Rank
Eulalio Muñoz	Marathon	—				2:14:29 SB	41
Juan Manuel Cano	20 kilometres walk	—				1:29:47	38

Field events

Athlete	Event	Qualification		Final	
Athlete	Event	Distance	Position	Distance	Position
Carlos Layoy	High jump	2.21m	21	did not advance	
Germán Chiaraviglio	Pole vault	5.30m	28	did not advance	
Ignacio Carballo	Shot put	18.74m	27	did not advance	
Joaquín Gómez	Hammer throw	69.03m	28	did not advance	

=== Women ===
Track and road events

Athlete	Event	Heat		Semi-final		Final	
Athlete	Event	Result	Rank	Result	Rank	Result	Rank
Florencia Borelli	5000 metres	16:06.36	32	—		did not advance	
Belén Casetta	3000 metres steeplechase	9:29.05	27	—		did not advance	
Carolina Lozano	3000 metres steeplechase	10:03.51 SB	41	—		did not advance	
