= Argentina at the 2013 World Championships in Athletics =

- WA code: ARG

in Moscow
- Competitors: 8
- Medals: Gold 0 Silver 0 Bronze 0 Total 0

World Championships in Athletics appearances
- 1980; 1983; 1987; 1991; 1993; 1995; 1997; 1999; 2001; 2003; 2005; 2007; 2009; 2011; 2013; 2015; 2017; 2019; 2022; 2023; 2025

Argentina competed at the 2013 World Championships in Athletics from August 10 to August 18 in Moscow, Russia. A team of 8 athletes was announced to represent the country in the event.

== Results ==
(q – qualified, NM – no mark, SB – season best)

=== Men ===
Athlete	Event	Final	
Athlete	Event	Time	Rank
Juan Manuel Cano	Men's 20 kilometres walk	1:30:45	46

Athlete	Event	Preliminaries		Final	
Athlete	Event	Mark	Rank	Mark	Rank
Germán Lauro	Men's shot put	20.09	9 q	20.40 SB	7

Decathlon

Román Gastaldi	Decathlon			
Román Gastaldi	Event	Results	Points	Rank
	100 m	11.20 SB	817	27
	Long jump	6.89	788	28
	Shot put	13.96 SB	726	19
	High jump	1.87	687	13
	400 m	DQ	0	-
	110 m hurdles	DNS	0	-
	Discus throw	DNS	0	-
	Pole vault	DNS	0	-
	Javelin throw	DNS	0	-
	1500 m	DNS	0	-
Total			DNF	-

=== Women ===
Athlete	Event	Preliminaries		Final	
Athlete	Event	Mark	Rank	Mark	Rank
Rocío Comba	Women's discus throw	61.54	9	59.83	12
Jennifer Dahlgren	Women's hammer throw	68.90	17	did not advance	

Athlete	Event	Final	
Athlete	Event	Time	Rank
María Peralta	Women's Marathon	DNF	-
Karina Córdoba	Women's Marathon	2:51:07	36
Karina Neipán	Women's Marathon	2:56:02	41
