= Argentina at the 2011 World Championships in Athletics =

- WA code: ARG
- National federation: Confederación Argentina de Atletismo
- Website: www.cada-atletismo.org/index.php

in Daegu
- Competitors: 6
- Medals: Gold 0 Silver 0 Bronze 0 Total 0

World Championships in Athletics appearances
- 1980; 1983; 1987; 1991; 1993; 1995; 1997; 1999; 2001; 2003; 2005; 2007; 2009; 2011; 2013; 2015; 2017; 2019; 2022; 2023; 2025

Argentina competed at the 2011 World Championships in Athletics from August 27 to September 4 in Daegu, South Korea. A team of 6 athletes was announced to represent the country in the event.

== Results ==
=== Men ===
Athlete	Event	Preliminaries		Heats		Semifinals		Final	
Athlete	Event	Time Width Height	Rank	Time Width Height	Rank	Time Width Height	Rank	Time Width Height	Rank
Javier Carriqueo	5000 metres			13:47.51	18			Did not advance	
Juan Manuel Cano	20 kilometres walk							1:30:00	36
Maximiliano Díaz	Triple jump	15.91	26					Did not advance	
Germán Lauro	Shot put	19.50	21					Did not advance	
Juan Ignacio Cerra	Hammer throw	64.27	34					Did not advance	

=== Women ===
Athlete	Event	Preliminaries		Heats		Semifinals		Final	
Athlete	Event	Time Width Height	Rank	Time Width Height	Rank	Time Width Height	Rank	Time Width Height	Rank
Jennifer Dahlgren	Hammer throw	72.70 SB	3 Q					69.72	10
