= Denmark at the 2017 World Championships in Athletics =

- Flag of Denmark
- WA code: DEN
- National federation: Danish Athletics Federation
- Website: dansk-atletik.dk (in Danish)

in London, United Kingdom 4–13 August 2017
- Competitors: 4 (2 men and 2 women) in 4 events
- Medals: Gold 0 Silver 0 Bronze 0 Total 0

World Championships in Athletics appearances
- 1980; 1983; 1987; 1991; 1993; 1995; 1997; 1999; 2001; 2003; 2005; 2007; 2009; 2011; 2013; 2015; 2017; 2019; 2022; 2023; 2025

Denmark competed at the 2017 World Championships in Athletics in London, United Kingdom, 4–13 August 2017.

== Results ==
=== Men ===
Track and road events

Athlete	Event	Heat		Semifinal		Final	
Athlete	Event	Result	Rank	Result	Rank	Result	Rank
Abdi Hakin Ulad	Marathon	—N/a				2:14:22 SB	13
Ole Hesselbjerg	3000 m steeplechase	8:27.86 PB	18	—N/a		Did not advance	

=== Women ===
Track and road events

Athlete	Event	Heat		Semifinal		Final	
Athlete	Event	Result	Rank	Result	Rank	Result	Rank
Sara Petersen	400 m hurdles	55.23	8 Q	55.45	9	Did not advance	
Anna Emilie Møller	3000 m steeplechase	9:44.12	21	—N/a		Did not advance	
