= Denmark at the 2022 World Athletics Championships =

- Flag of Denmark
- WA code: DEN

in Eugene, United States 15 July 2022 – 24 July 2022
- Competitors: 16 (8 men and 8 women)
- Medals: Gold 0 Silver 0 Bronze 0 Total 0

World Athletics Championships appearances
- 1980; 1983; 1987; 1991; 1993; 1995; 1997; 1999; 2001; 2003; 2005; 2007; 2009; 2011; 2013; 2015; 2017; 2019; 2022; 2023; 2025

Denmark competed at the 2022 World Athletics Championships in Eugene, United States, from 15 to 24 July 2022.

== Results ==
Denmark entered 16 athletes.

Key

- Q = Qualified for the next round
- q = Qualified for the next round as a fastest loser or, in field events, by position without achieving the qualifying target
- NR = National record
- PB = Personal best
- SB = Season best
- N/A = Round not applicable for the event

=== Men ===
Track and road events

Athlete	Event	Heat		Semifinal		Final	
Athlete	Event	Result	Rank	Result	Rank	Result	Rank
Simon Hansen	200 m	20.80	5	Did not advance			
Benjamin Lobo Vedel	400 m	46.27	5	Did not advance			
Thijs Nijhuis	Marathon	—N/a				2:16:55 SB	47
Simon Hansen; Frederik Schou-Nielsen; Tobias Larsen; Kojo Musah	4 × 100 m relay	DNF	–	—N/a		Did not advance	

=== Women ===
Track and road events

Athlete	Event	Heat		Semifinal		Final	
Athlete	Event	Result	Rank	Result	Rank	Result	Rank
Ida Karstoft	200 m	22.85	3 Q	22.84	5	Did not advance	
Mette Graversgaard	100 m hurdles	13.04	3 Q	13.05	7	Did not advance	
Mette Graversgaard; Mathilde Kramer; Astrid Glenner-Frandsen; Ida Karstoft	4 × 100 m relay	43.46 NR	=6	—N/a		Did not advance	

Field events

Athlete	Event	Qualification		Final	
Athlete	Event	Distance	Position	Distance	Position
Lisa Brix Pedersen	Discus throw	56.54	29	Did not advance	
Katrine Koch Jacobsen	Hammer throw	68.51	20	Did not advance	
