= Denmark at the 2023 World Athletics Championships =

- Flag of Denmark
- WA code: DEN

in Budapest, Hungary 19 August 2023 – 27 August 2023
- Competitors: 11 (2 men and 9 women)
- Medals: Gold 0 Silver 0 Bronze 0 Total 0

World Athletics Championships appearances
- 1980; 1983; 1987; 1991; 1993; 1995; 1997; 1999; 2001; 2003; 2005; 2007; 2009; 2011; 2013; 2015; 2017; 2019; 2022; 2023; 2025

Denmark competed at the 2023 World Athletics Championships in Budapest, Hungary, from 19 to 27 August 2023.

== Results ==
Denmark entered 11 athletes.

Key

- Q = Qualified for the next round
- q = Qualified for the next round as a fastest loser or, in field events, by position without achieving the qualifying target
- NR = National record
- PB = Personal best
- SB = Season best
- N/A = Round not applicable for the event

=== Men ===
Track and road events

Athlete	Event	Heat		Semifinal		Final	
Athlete	Event	Result	Rank	Result	Rank	Result	Rank
Gustav Lundholm Nielsen	400 metres	45.66 PB	7	Did not advance			
Kristian Uldbjerg Hansen	1500 metres	3:37.27 PB	13	Did not advance			

=== Women ===
Track and road events

Athlete	Event	Heat		Semifinal		Final	
Athlete	Event	Result	Rank	Result	Rank	Result	Rank
Annemarie Nissen	800 metres	2:00.47	4	Did not advance			
Sofia Thøgersen	1500 metres	4:05.34 NR	7	Did not advance			
Juliane Hvid	3000 metres steeplechase	10:09.41	10	—N/a		Did not advance	
Mette Graversgaard	100 metres hurdles	12.87	5 q	12.94	7	Did not advance	
Karen Ehrenreich	Marathon	—N/a				2:44:46	59

Field events

Athlete	Event	Qualification		Final	
Athlete	Event	Distance	Position	Distance	Position
Caroline Bonde Holm	Pole vault	4.35	24	Did not advance	
Annesofie Hartmann Nielsen	Discus throw	54.90	30	Did not advance	
Lisa Brix Pedersen	Discus throw	57.96	24	Did not advance	
Katrine Koch Jacobsen	Hammer throw	71.25	12 q	71.33 SB	9
