= Denmark at the 2009 World Championships in Athletics =

- WA code: DEN

in Berlin
- Competitors: 3 (1 man, 2 women)
- Medals: Gold 0 Silver 0 Bronze 0 Total 0

World Championships in Athletics appearances
- 1980; 1983; 1987; 1991; 1993; 1995; 1997; 1999; 2001; 2003; 2005; 2007; 2009; 2011; 2013; 2015; 2017; 2019; 2022; 2023; 2025

Denmark competed at the 2009 World Championships in Athletics from 15–23 August in Berlin.

== Team selection ==
Track and road events

Event	Athletes	
Event	Men	Women
400 metre hurdles		Sara Petersen
Marathon		Annemette Aagaard

Field and combined events

Event	Athletes	
Event	Men	Women
Long jump	Morten Jensen	

== Results ==
=== Men ===
Field and combined events

Event	Athletes	Qualification		Final	
Event	Athletes	Result	Rank	Result	Rank
Long Jump	Morten Jensen	7.75	29	did not advance	

=== Women ===
Track and road events

Event	Athletes	Heats		Semifinal		Final	
Event	Athletes	Result	Rank	Result	Rank	Result	Rank
400 m hurdles	Sara Petersen	56.51	21	56.99	20	did not advance	
Marathon	Annemette Aagaard	-				2:42:03 SB	46
