= 1980 World Championships in Athletics =

Athletics competition in Sittard, Netherlands

- Dutch logo
- Host city: Sittard, Netherlands
- Nations: 21
- Athletes: 42
- Events: 2
- Dates: 14–16 August 1980
- Opened by: Queen Beatrix
- Main venue: De Baandert

The 1980 World Championships in Athletics (Dutch: Wereldkampioenschappen atletiek 1980) was the second global, international athletics competition organised by the International Association of Athletics Federations (IAAF). Hosted from 14 to 16 August 1980 at the De Baandert in Sittard, Netherlands, it featured two events: the women's 400 metres hurdles and the women's 3000 metres run. West Germany's Birgit Friedmann took the first women's world title in the 3000 m, while her East German counterpart Bärbel Broschat became the first women's 400 m hurdles world champion.

== Summary ==
Historically, the IAAF and the International Olympic Committee (IOC) agreed that the Athletics at the Summer Olympics served as the world championship event for the sport. The IAAF began to expand its programme of approved events for women and this conflicted with the Olympic athletics programme. The 400 m hurdles was recently introduced event for female athletes while the 3000 m marked the increasing popularity of long-distance running events among women. Neither event was contested at the 1980 Moscow Olympics. The boycott of those Olympics and the presence of the Liberty Bell Classic (an alternative event for the boycotting nations) gave the IAAF additional incentive to hold its own competition; although the Soviet Union withdrew, the events in Sittard attracted entries from countries on both sides of the Western and Eastern divide.

A total of 42 women from 21 nations entered the competition – there were 18 participants in the 3000 m and 24 athletes in the 400 m hurdles. The hurdles format had four heats of six athletes, two semi-finals of eight athletes, then an "A" and a "B" final. The 3000 m run had two stages: two heats of nine athletes each, followed by a final of twelve athletes.

The tournament followed the 1976 World Championships in Athletics, which featured just one event – the men's 50 kilometres walk – and was organised by the IAAF in reaction to the IOC dropping that event for the 1976 Summer Olympics. The 1980 World Championships preceded the launch of the IAAF's independent global event, with the inaugural 1983 World Championships in Athletics taking place three years later with a programme of 41 events.

One athlete, Spain's Rosa Colorado, later had her results at the championships disqualified for doping offences.

== Medallists ==
Event	Gold	Silver	Bronze
3000 metres	Birgit Friedmann; West Germany	Karoline Nemetz; Sweden	Ingrid Kristiansen; Norway
400 metres hurdles	Bärbel Broschat; East Germany	Ellen Neumann; East Germany	Petra Pfaff; East Germany

== Medal table ==
* Host nation (Netherlands)

Rank	Nation	Gold	Silver	Bronze	Total
1	East Germany	1	1	1	3
2	West Germany	1	0	0	1
3	Sweden	0	1	0	1
4	Norway	0	0	1	1
Totals (4 entries)		2	2	2	6

== Schedule ==
Date	Event
14 August	400 m hurdles heats 3000 m heats
15 August	400 m hurdles semi-finals 10,000 m final
16 August	400 m hurdles finals 3000 m final

== 400 metres hurdles results ==
=== Heats ===
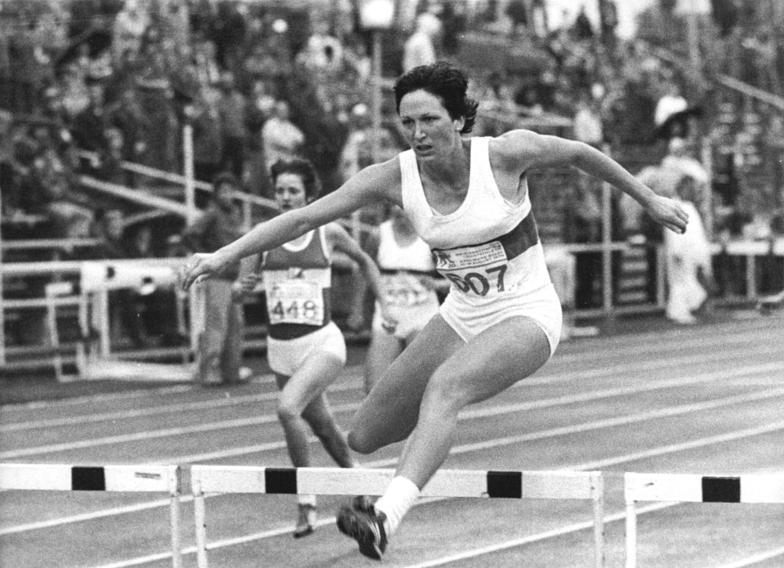
Hurdles winner Bärbel Broschat was the fastest athlete in all three rounds.

Qualifying rule: the first three athletes in each heat (Q) plus the four fastest non-qualifiers (q) progressed to the semi-finals.

Rank	Heat	Name	Nationality	Time	Notes
1	3	Bärbel Broschat	East Germany	56.13	Q
2	4	Ellen Neumann	East Germany	56.35	Q
3	1	Esther Mahr	United States	57.51	Q
4	1	Hilde Frederiksen	Norway	57.72	Q
5	2	Petra Pfaff	East Germany	57.92	Q
6	4	Christine Warden	Great Britain & N.I.	57.84	Q
7	2	Lynette Foreman	Australia	58.07	Q
8	1	Montserrat Pujol	Spain	58.54	Q
8	3	Mary Appleby	Ireland	58.54	Q
10	3	Rosa Colorado	Spain	58.79	Q
11	1	Olga Commandeur	Netherlands	58.87	q
12	4	Helle Sichlau	Denmark	58.99	Q
13	2	Susan Dalgoutté	Great Britain & N.I.	59.63	Q
14	2	Esther Kaufmann	Switzerland	59.74	q
15	2	Simone Büngener	West Germany	59.98	q
16	3	Francine Gendron	Canada	1:00.40	q
17	3	Debra Melrose	United States	1:00.46	
18	1	Lai Lih-jian	Chinese Taipei	1:01.01	
19	3	Ruth Dubois	France	1:01.12	
20	2	Dominique Le Disset	France	1:01.22	
21	4	Kim Whitehead	United States	1:01.33	
22	4	Andrea Wachter	Canada	1:02.28	
23	4	Célestine N'Drin	Ivory Coast	1:04.91	
	1	Kirsi Ulvinen	Sweden	DQ	

=== Semi-finals ===
Qualifying rule: the first four athletes in each semi-final (Q) progressed to the "A" final. The remaining non-qualifiers were entered into the "B" final.

Rank	Heat	Name	Nationality	Time	Notes
1	1	Bärbel Broschat	East Germany	55.89	Q
1	2	Ellen Neumann	East Germany	55.89	Q
3	2	Esther Mahr	United States	56.16	Q
4	1	Petra Pfaff	East Germany	56.78	Q
5	1	Mary Appleby	Ireland	57.06	Q
6	2	Christine Warden	Great Britain & N.I.	57.26	Q
7	1	Hilde Frederiksen	Norway	57.44	Q
8	2	Lynette Foreman	Australia	57.46	Q
9	2	Rosa Colorado	Spain	57.47	
10	1	Montserrat Pujol	Spain	57.72	
11	2	Olga Commandeur	Netherlands	57.93	NR
12	1	Helle Sichlau	Denmark	58.44	
13	2	Simone Büngener	West Germany	59.11	
14	2	Esther Kaufmann	Switzerland	59.55	
15	1	Susan Dalgoutté	Great Britain & N.I.	59.85	
16	1	Francine Gendron	Canada	1:00.14	

=== "A" final ===
Rank	Lane	Name	Nationality	Time	Notes
1st place, gold medalist(s)	7	Bärbel Broschat	East Germany	54.55	CR, PB
2nd place, silver medalist(s)	6	Ellen Neumann	East Germany	54.56	
3rd place, bronze medalist(s)	8	Petra Pfaff	East Germany	55.84	
4	5	Mary Appleby	Ireland	56.51	
5	1	Esther Mahr	United States	56.81	
6	4	Hilde Frederiksen	Norway	56.85	
7	3	Lynette Foreman	Australia	58.24	
	2	Christine Warden	Great Britain & N.I.	DQ	

=== "B" final ===
Rank	Name	Nationality	Time	Notes
~~1~~	Rosa Colorado	Spain	~~57.51~~	DQ, doping
1	Helle Sichlau	Denmark	58.03	
2	Montserrat Pujol	Spain	58.38	
4	Simone Büngener	West Germany	58.77	
5	Susan Dalgoutté	Great Britain & N.I.	59.31	
6	Esther Kaufmann	Switzerland	59.41	
7	Francine Gendron	Canada	59.61	
	Olga Commandeur	Netherlands	DNF	

== 3000 metres results ==
=== Heats ===
Qualifying rule: the first five athletes in each heat (Q) plus the two fastest non-qualifiers (q) progressed to the final.

Rank	Heat	Name	Nationality	Time	Notes
1	1	Aurora Cunha	Portugal	9:04.7	Q
1	2	Birgit Friedmann	West Germany	9:04.7	Q
3	2	Breda Pergar	Yugoslavia	9:04.9	Q
4	2	Karoline Nemetz	Sweden	9:04.9	Q
5	2	Joelle Debrouwer	France	9:05.0	Q
6	2	Penny Werthner	Canada	9:05.8	Q
7	1	Charlotte Teske	West Germany	9:06.1	Q
8	1	Ingrid Kristiansen	Norway	9:06.4	Q
9	1	Eva Ernström	Sweden	9:06.5	Q
10	2	Wendy Smith	Great Britain & N.I.	9:07.3	q
11	1	Geri Fitch	Canada	9:07.6	Q
12	1	Mary Shea	United States	9:09.4	q
13	2	Julie Shea	United States	9:11.4	
14	2	Fionnuala Morrish	Ireland	9:13.8	
15	1	Anat Meiri	Israel	9:26.7	
16	1	Anne Audain	New Zealand	9:26.8	
17	1	Brenda Webb	United States	9:27.6	
18	2	Olga Caccaviello	Argentina	10:01.2	

=== Final ===
Rank	Name	Nationality	Time	Notes
1st place, gold medalist(s)	Birgit Friedmann	West Germany	8:48.05	CR, PB
2nd place, silver medalist(s)	Karoline Nemetz	Sweden	8:50.22	
3rd place, bronze medalist(s)	Ingrid Kristiansen	Norway	8:58.8	
4	Joelle Debrouwer	France	8:59.0	
5	Breda Pergar	Yugoslavia	8:59.7	
6	Penny Werthner	Canada	9:03.5	
7	Charlotte Teske	West Germany	9:04.3	
8	Eva Ernström	Sweden	9:07.7	
9	Aurora Cunha	Portugal	9:11.2	
10	Mary Shea	United States	9:13.7	
11	Geri Fitch	Canada	9:37.6	
	Wendy Smith	Great Britain & N.I.	DNF	

== 10,000 metres results ==
Held alongside the men's international Netherlands vs Ireland vs Wales match, the event saw some invitation events for women which are not considered part of the World Championships. Nevertheless, the 10,000 metres appear in IAAF statistics as it was not part of the Olympic programme at the time.

Rank	Name	Nationality	Time	Notes
1	Kath Binns	Great Britain	32:57.17	NR
2	Fionnuala Morrish	Ireland	33:51.7	
3	Magda Ilands	Belgium	34:25.3	
4	Marja Wokke	Netherlands	35:28.9	

== Participation ==
- Argentina (1)
- Australia (1)
- Canada (4)
- Chinese Taipei (1)
- Denmark (1)
- East Germany (3)
- France (3)
- Great Britain and Northern Ireland (3)
- Ireland (2)
- Israel (1)
- Ivory Coast (1)
- Netherlands (1)
- New Zealand (1)
- Norway (2)
- Portugal (1)
- Spain (2)
- Sweden (3)
- Switzerland (1)
- United States (6)
- West Germany (3)
- Yugoslavia (1)
