= Chinese Taipei at the 2015 World Championships in Athletics =

- WA code: TPE

in Beijing
- Competitors: 5
- Medals: Gold 0 Silver 0 Bronze 0 Total 0

World Championships in Athletics appearances
- 1980; 1983; 1987; 1991; 1993; 1995; 1997; 1999; 2001; 2003; 2005; 2007; 2009; 2011; 2013; 2015; 2017; 2019; 2022; 2023; 2025

Chinese Taipei competed at the 2015 World Championships in Athletics in Beijing, China, from 22–30 August 2015.

== Results ==
(q – qualified, NM – no mark, SB – season best)

=== Men ===
Track and road events

Athlete	Event	Heat		Semifinal		Final	
Athlete	Event	Result	Rank	Result	Rank	Result	Rank
Ho Chin-ping	Marathon	—N/a				2:28:14	33

Field events

Athlete	Event	Qualification		Final	
Athlete	Event	Distance	Position	Distance	Position
Hsiang Chun-hsien	High jump	2.22	32	Did not advance	
Huang Shih-feng	Javelin throw	75.72	27	Did not advance	

=== Women ===
Track and road events

Athlete	Event	Heat		Semifinal		Final	
Athlete	Event	Result	Rank	Result	Rank	Result	Rank
Hsieh Chien-ho	Marathon	—N/a				2:58:25	52
Hsu Yu-fang	Marathon	—N/a				2:48:01	45
