= Petra Pfaff =

East German hurdler

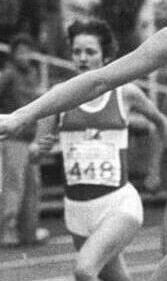
- Pfaff in 1979

Medal record

Women's athletics

Representing East Germany

World Championships
Gold medal – first place	1980 Sittard	400 m hurdles

European Championships
Silver medal – second place	1982 Athens	400 m hurdles

Petra Pfaff (born 16 October 1960 in Hoyerswerda) is a retired East German 400 metres hurdler.

In 1980, a special edition of the World Championships was staged in Sittard, holding events not yet on the Olympic programme. Pfaff won the bronze medal in the 400 m hurdles behind compatriots Bärbel Broschat and Ellen Neumann. Pfaff later won the silver medal in the women's 400 m hurdles at the 1982 European Championships behind Sweden's Ann-Louise Skoglund.

In 1983 she finished fourth at the World Championships. Her result was 54.64 seconds, the best time she had in her career. Pfaff represented the sports club SC Cottbus, and became East German champion in 1980.

Pfaff is 1.72 metres tall; during her active career she weighed 58 kg.
