= Norway at the 1980 World Championships in Athletics =

- Flag of Norway
- WA code: NOR

in Sittard, Netherlands 14 August 1980 – 16 August 1980
- Competitors: 2 (2 women) in 2 events
- Medals Ranked 4th: Gold 0 Silver 0 Bronze 1 Total 1

World Championships in Athletics appearances (overview)
- 1980; 1983; 1987; 1991; 1993; 1995; 1997; 1999; 2001; 2003; 2005; 2007; 2009; 2011; 2013; 2015; 2017; 2019; 2022; 2023; 2025

Norway competed at the 1980 World Championships in Athletics in Sittard, Netherlands, from 14 to 16 August 1980.

== Medalists ==
Medal	Athlete	Event	Date
Bronze	Ingrid Christensen	Women's 3000 metres	16 August

== Results ==
Key

- Q = Qualified for the next round
- q = Qualified for the next round as a fastest loser or, in field events, by position without achieving the qualifying target
- NR = National record
- PB = Personal best
- SB = Season best
- N/A = Round not applicable for the event

Athlete	Event	Heat		Semifinal		Final	
Athlete	Event	Result	Rank	Result	Rank	Result	Rank
Ingrid Christensen	Women's 3000 metres	9:06.4	8 Q	—N/a		8:58.8	3rd place, bronze medalist(s)
Hilde Frederiksen	Women's 400 metres hurdles	57.72	4 Q	57.44	7	56.85	6
