= Argentina at the 2019 World Athletics Championships =

Argentina at the 2019 World Championships in Athletics
- WA code: ARG

in Doha, Qatar 27 September 2019 – 6 October 2019
- Competitors: 3 (1 man and 2 women) in 3 events
- Medals: Gold 0 Silver 0 Bronze 0 Total 0

World Championships in Athletics appearances
- 1980; 1983; 1987; 1991; 1993; 1995; 1997; 1999; 2001; 2003; 2005; 2007; 2009; 2011; 2013; 2015; 2017; 2019; 2022; 2023; 2025

Argentina competed at the 2019 World Athletics Championships in Doha, Qatar, which were held from 27 September to 6 October 2019. The athlete delegation of the country was composed of three people: Florencia Borelli in the women's 5000 metres, Belén Casetta in the women's 3000 metres steeplechase, and Joaquín Gómez in the men's hammer throw. All of the athletes qualified through their IAAF World Ranking.

Cassetta competed first, placing ninth in her heat and did not advance to the finals. Gómez competed a few days later and did not qualify for the finals after not reaching the top 12 at the qualifications. Borelli was the last athlete to compete, though also did not qualify for her finals. None of the athletes won a medal.

== Background ==
The 2019 World Athletics Championships in Doha, Qatar, were held from 27 September to 6 October 2019. The Championships were held at Khalifa International Stadium. To qualify for the World Championships, athletes had to reach an entry standard (e.g. time or distance), place in a specific position at select competitions, be a wild card entry, or qualify through their IAAF World Ranking at the end of the qualification period. The athletes for Argentina were Florencia Borelli in the women's 5000 metres (ranked 31), Belén Casetta in the women's 3000 metres steeplechase (ranked 16), and Joaquín Gómez in the men's hammer throw (ranked 19), who all qualified through their world ranking.

The three athletes visited the Argentinian Embassy in Qatar after their stint at the World Championships.

== Events ==
=== Men ===
The qualification round for the men's hammer throw was held on 1 October. Gómez was part of Group A and recorded distances of 70.07, 70.17, and 68.40 metres. He placed last in his group and last overall, not advancing for the finals as he did not place within the top 12 of the competitors.

Field events
Athlete	Event	Qualification		Final	
Athlete	Event	Result	Rank	Result	Rank
Joaquín Gómez	Hammer throw	70.17	31	did not advance	

=== Women ===
Casetta's heats for the women's 3000 metres steeplechase were held on 27 September, where she raced in the third heat against fourteen other competitors. She ran in a time of 9:45.07 and placed ninth in her heat and 29th overall, not advancing for the finals. Borelli then competed in the heats of the women's 5000 metres on 2 October, where she raced in the first heat against fifteen other competitors. She ran in a time of 15:56.49 and placed 12th in her heat and 25th overall.

Track and road events
Athlete	Event	Heat		Semifinal		Final	
Athlete	Event	Result	Rank	Result	Rank	Result	Rank
Florencia Borelli	5000 metres	15:56.49	25	—		did not advance	
Belén Casetta	3000 metres steeplechase	9:45.07	29	—		did not advance	
