= United States at the 1980 World Championships in Athletics =

- Flag of the United States
- WA code: USA
- National federation: USA Track & Field
- Website: usatf.org

in Sittard, Netherlands August 14 to 16, 1980
- Competitors: 6 in 2 events
- Medals: Gold 0 Silver 0 Bronze 0 Total 0

World Championships in Athletics appearances (overview)
- 1976; 1980; 1983; 1987; 1991; 1993; 1995; 1997; 1999; 2001; 2003; 2005; 2007; 2009; 2011; 2013; 2015; 2017; 2019; 2022; 2023; 2025

The United States competed at the 1980 World Championships in Athletics in Sittard, Netherlands, from August 14 to 16, 1980. The championships consisted of two events the women's 400 meters and 3000 meters. The USA entered six and none won a medal.

== Results ==
=== 400 meters ===
Athlete	Event	Heat		Semifinal		Final	
Athlete	Event	Result	Rank	Result	Rank	Result	Rank
Esther Mahr	400 metres	57.51	3 Q	56.16	3 Q	56.81	5
Debra Melrose	400 metres	1:00.46	17	Did not advance			
Kim Whitehead	400 metres	1:01.33	21	Did not advance			

=== 3000 meters ===
Athlete	Event	Heat		Final	
Athlete	Event	Result	Rank	Result	Rank
Mary Shea	3000 metres	9:09.4	12 q	9:13.7	10
Julie Shea	3000 metres	9:11.4	13	Did not advance	
Brenda Webb (athlete)	3000 metres	9:27.6	17	Did not advance	
