= Argentina at the 2025 World Athletics Championships =

- Flag of Argentina
- WA code: ARG

in Tokyo, Japan 13 September 2025 – 21 September 2025
- Competitors: 5 (3 men and 2 women)
- Medals: Gold 0 Silver 0 Bronze 0 Total 0

World Athletics Championships appearances
- 1980; 1983; 1987; 1991; 1993; 1995; 1997; 1999; 2001; 2003; 2005; 2007; 2009; 2011; 2013; 2015; 2017; 2019; 2022; 2023; 2025

Argentina competed at the 2025 World Athletics Championships in Tokyo, Japan, from 13 to 21 September 2025.

== Results ==
Argentina entered 5 athletes to the championships: 2 women and 3 men.

Key

- Q = Qualified for the next round
- q = Qualified for the next round as a fastest loser or, in field events, by position without achieving the qualifying target
- NR = National record
- PB = Personal best
- SB = Season best
- N/A = Round not applicable for the event

=== Men ===
Track and road events

| Athlete | Event | Heat | | Semifinal | | Final | |
| Athlete | Event | Result | Rank | Result | Rank | Result | Rank |
|---|---|---|---|---|---|---|---|
| Elián Larregina | 400 metres | 44.97 | 5 | Did not advance | | | |
| Diego Lacamoire | 1500 metres | 3:57.42 | 14 | Did not advance | | | |

Field events

| Athlete | Event | Qualification | | Final | |
| Athlete | Event | Distance | Position | Distance | Position |
|---|---|---|---|---|---|
| Joaquín Gómez | Hammer throw | 72.68 | 27 | Did not advance | |

=== Women ===
Track and road events

| Athlete | Event | Heat | | Semifinal | | Final | |
| Athlete | Event | Result | Rank | Result | Rank | Result | Rank |
|---|---|---|---|---|---|---|---|
| Micaela Levaggi | 1500 metres | 4:09.76 NR | 12 | Did not advance | | | |
| Chiara Milena Mainetti | Marathon | —N/a | | | | 2:46:27 | 50 |
