= Denmark at the 2019 World Athletics Championships =

- WA code: DEN

in Doha, Qatar
- Competitors: 7 (1 man and 6 women) in 5 events
- Medals: Gold 0 Silver 0 Bronze 0 Total 0

World Athletics Championships appearances
- 1980; 1983; 1987; 1991; 1993; 1995; 1997; 1999; 2001; 2003; 2005; 2007; 2009; 2011; 2013; 2015; 2017; 2019; 2022; 2023

Denmark competed at the 2019 World Championships in Athletics in Doha, Qatar from 27 September to 6 October 2019.

== Results ==
(q – qualified, NM – no mark, SB – season best)

=== Men ===
Track and road events

Athlete	Event	Final	
Athlete	Event	Result	Rank
Thijs Nijhuis	Marathon	2:18:10	31

=== Women ===
Track and road events

Athlete	Event	Heat		Semifinal		Final	
Athlete	Event	Result	Rank	Result	Rank	Result	Rank
Anna Emilie Møller	5000 m	15:11.76	16	—		did not advance	
Anna Emilie Møller	3000 m steeplechase	9:18.92 NR	4 q	—		9:13.46 NR	7
Sara Petersen	400 m hurdles	DSQ		did not advance			
Astrid Glenner-Frandsen; Ida Karstoft; Mette Graversgaard; Mathilde Kramer	4 × 100 m relay	43.92	13	—		did not advance	
