= Norway at the 2015 World Championships in Athletics =

- WA code: NOR
- Website: www.friidrett.no

in Beijing
- Competitors: 9
- Medals: Gold 0 Silver 0 Bronze 0 Total 0

World Championships in Athletics appearances (overview)
- 1980; 1983; 1987; 1991; 1993; 1995; 1997; 1999; 2001; 2003; 2005; 2007; 2009; 2011; 2013; 2015; 2017; 2019; 2022; 2023; 2025

Norway competed at the 2015 World Championships in Athletics in Beijing, China, from 22–30 August 2015.

== Results ==
(q – qualified, NM – no mark, SB – season best)

=== Men ===
Track and road events

Athlete	Event	Heat		Semifinal		Final	
Athlete	Event	Result	Rank	Result	Rank	Result	Rank
Henrik Ingebrigtsen	1500 metres	3:43.97	31	did not advance			
Sindre Buraas	5000 metres	13:59.07	30	—N/a		did not advance	
Erik Tysse	20 kilometres walk	—N/a				DNF	
Håvard Haukenes	50 kilometres walk	—N/a				3:56:50 SB	24

=== Women ===
Track and road events

Athlete	Event	Heat		Semifinal		Final	
Athlete	Event	Result	Rank	Result	Rank	Result	Rank
Ezinne Okparaebo	100 metres	11.12 SB	12 q	11.19	18	did not advance	
Karoline Bjerkeli Grøvdal	5000 metres	16:02.20	20	—N/a		did not advance	
Isabelle Pedersen	100 metres hurdles	12.96	15 Q	12.86 PB	=8	did not advance	
Amalie Iuel	400 metres hurdles	56.59	26	did not advance			

Combined events – Heptathlon

Athlete	Event	100H	HJ	SP	200 m	LJ	JT	800 m	Final	Rank
Ida Marcussen	Result	14.47	1.68	12.86	26.27	5.89	42.01	2:12.62	5684	25
Ida Marcussen	Points	913	830	718	774	816	706	927	5684	25
