= Norway at the 2025 World Athletics Championships =

- Flag of Norway
- WA code: NOR

in Tokyo, Japan 13 September 2025 – 21 September 2025
- Competitors: 28 (14 men and 14 women)
- Medals: Gold 0 Silver 0 Bronze 0 Total 0

World Athletics Championships appearances (overview)
- 1980; 1983; 1987; 1991; 1993; 1995; 1997; 1999; 2001; 2003; 2005; 2007; 2009; 2011; 2013; 2015; 2017; 2019; 2022; 2023; 2025

Norway competed at the 2025 World Athletics Championships in Tokyo, Japan, from 13 to 21 September 2025. For the first time in 10 years, Norway did not win a medal at the championships.

== Results ==
Norway entered 28 athletes to the championships: 14 women and 14 men.

Key

- Q = Qualified for the next round
- q = Qualified for the next round as a fastest loser or, in field events, by position without achieving the qualifying target
- NR = National record
- PB = Personal best
- SB = Season best
- N/A = Round not applicable for the event

=== Men ===
Track and road events

Athlete	Event	Heat		Semifinal		Final	
Athlete	Event	Result	Rank	Result	Rank	Result	Rank
Tobias Grønstad	800 metres	1:45.93	6	Did not advance			
Jakob Ingebrigtsen	1500 metres	3:37.84	8	Did not advance			
Håkon Moe Berg	1500 metres	3:42.24	11	Did not advance			
Narve Gilje Nordås	1500 metres	3:35.90	1 Q	3:35.72	7	Did not advance	
Jakob Ingebrigtsen	5000 metres	13:42.15 SB	8 Q	—N/a		13:02:00	10
Narve Gilje Nordås	5000 metres	13:25.00	12	—N/a		Did not advance	
Awet Nftalem Kibrab	10,000 metres	—N/a				29:19.91	17
Zerei Kbrom Mezngi	Marathon	—N/a				DNF	
Sondre Nordstad Moen	Marathon	—N/a				2:21:22	49
Karsten Warholm	400 metres hurdles	48.56	3 Q	47.72	2 Q	47.58	5

Field events

Athlete	Event	Qualification		Final	
Athlete	Event	Distance	Position	Distance	Position
Simen Guttormsen	Pole vault	5.40	26	Did not advance	
Sondre Guttormsen	Pole vault	5.75	1 q	5.90 SB	6
Marcus Thomsen	Shot put	20.48	11 q	20.53	10
Eivind Henriksen	Hammer throw	77.70 SB	5 Q	76.47	9
Thomas Mardal	Hammer throw	77.34	7 Q	78.02	6

Combined events – Decathlon

Athlete	Event	100 m	LJ	SP	HJ	400 m	110H	DT	PV	JT	1500 m	Final	Rank
Sander Skotheim	Result	10.91	7.97	14.50	2.14	47.86	DQ	DNS	—N/a			DNF	
Sander Skotheim	Points	881	1053	759	934	916	0	DNS	—N/a			DNF	

=== Women ===
Track and road events

Athlete	Event	Heat		Semifinal		Final	
Athlete	Event	Result	Rank	Result	Rank	Result	Rank
Henriette Jæger	400 metres	50.12	2 Q	49.87	3 q	49.74	7
Anne Gine Løvnes	1500 metres	4:10.61	9	Did not advance			
Ingeborg Østgård	1500 metres	4:27.56	15	Did not advance			
Hanne Andersen Maridal	Marathon	—N/a				2:55:04 SB	56
Amalie Iuel	400 metres hurdles	54.65	3 Q	54.28 PB	3	Did not advance	
Josefine Tomine Eriksen; Astri Ertzgaard; Amalie Iuel; Henriette Jæger	4 × 400 metres relay	3:23.84 NR	2 Q	—N/a		3:23.71 NR	6

Field events

Athlete	Event	Qualification		Final	
Athlete	Event	Distance	Position	Distance	Position
Kitty Friele Faye	Pole vault	4.45	17	Did not advance	
Lene Onsrud Retzius	Pole vault	4.45	21	Did not advance	
Beatrice Nedberge Llano	Hammer throw	70.10	15	Did not advance	
Sigrid Borge	Javelin throw	54.90	31	Did not advance	
Marie-Therese Obst	Javelin throw	57.52	22	Did not advance	
