= Argentina at the 2007 World Championships in Athletics =

- Flag of Argentina
- WA code: ARG

in Osaka, Japan 25 August 2007 – 2 September 2007
- Competitors: 6 (4 men and 2 women)
- Medals: Gold 0 Silver 0 Bronze 0 Total 0

World Championships in Athletics appearances
- 1980; 1983; 1987; 1991; 1993; 1995; 1997; 1999; 2001; 2003; 2005; 2007; 2009; 2011; 2013; 2015; 2017; 2019; 2022; 2023; 2025

Argentina competed at the 2007 World Championships in Athletics in Osaka, Japan, from 25 August to 2 September 2007.

== Results ==
Argentina entered 6 athletes.

Key

- Q = Qualified for the next round
- q = Qualified for the next round as a fastest loser or, in field events, by position without achieving the qualifying target
- NR = National record
- PB = Personal best
- SB = Season best
- N/A = Round not applicable for the event

=== Men ===
Track and road events

Athlete	Event	Heat		Semifinal		Final		Final Rank
Athlete	Event	Result	Rank	Result	Rank	Result	Rank	Final Rank
Javier Carriqueo	1500 metres	3:42.20	9	Did not advance				26

Field events

Athlete	Event	Qualification		Final		Final Rank
Athlete	Event	Result	Rank	Result	Rank	Final Rank
Germán Chiaraviglio	Pole vault	5.55	12	Did not advance		18
Germán Lauro	Shot put	19.19	13	Did not advance		24
Pablo Pietrobelli	Javelin Throw	74.81	12	Did not advance		26

=== Women ===
Field events

Athlete	Event	Qualification		Final		Final Rank
Athlete	Event	Result	Rank	Result	Rank	Final Rank
Alejandra García	Pole vault	4.20	15	Did not advance		26
Jennifer Dahlgren	Hammer Throw	65.64	11	Did not advance		25
