= Bärbel Broschat =

East German hurdler

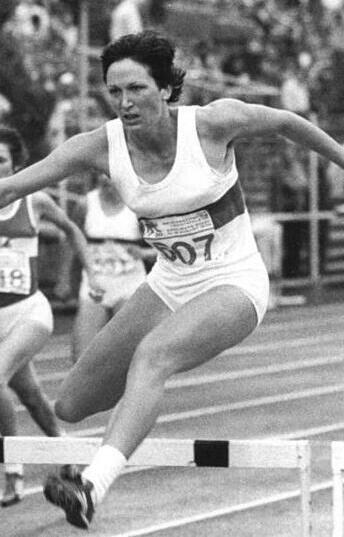

Medal record

Women's athletics

Representing East Germany

World Championships
Gold medal – first place	1980 Sittard	400 m hurdles

Bärbel Broschat, née Bärbel Klepp, (2 November 1957 in Magdeburg) is a retired East German 400 metres hurdler.

== Biography ==
In 1980, a special edition of the World Championships was staged in Sittard, holding events not yet on the Olympic programme. Broschat won the 400 m hurdles ahead of compatriots Ellen Neumann and Petra Pfaff. Her winning time of 54.55 seconds was a career best time. This ranks her tenth among German 400 m hurdlers, behind Sabine Busch, Cornelia Ullrich, Ellen Fiedler, Heike Meißner, Gudrun Abt, Silvia Rieger, Susanne Losch, Karin Roßley and Petra Krug.

Broschat represented the sports club SC Magdeburg, and became East German champion in 1979.

Broschat is 1.73 metres tall; during her active career she weighed 62 kg.
