= De Baandert =

Stadium in Sittard-Geleen, Netherlands

Coordinates: 51°0′23″N 5°52′37″E

De Baandert was a multi-use stadium in Sittard-Geleen, Netherlands. Opened in 1964 it was used mostly for football matches and hosted the home matches of Fortuna Sittard. The stadium was able to hold 22,000 people. It was closed in 1999 when Fortuna Sittard Stadion opened.

The stadium hosted one international match of the Netherlands national football team: a friendly played on 27 May 1992 against Austria (3-2).

The stadium also hosted the 1980 World Championships in Athletics featuring two events not included in the Summer Olympics 1980: the women's 400 metres hurdles and the women's 3000 metres run.
