= Ivory Coast at the 2013 World Championships in Athletics =

- WA code: CIV
- National federation: Fédération Ivoirienne d'Athlétisme

in Moscow
- Competitors: 2
- Medals: Gold 0 Silver 2 Bronze 0 Total 2

World Championships in Athletics appearances
- 1980; 1983; 1987; 1991; 1993; 1995; 1997; 1999; 2001; 2003; 2005; 2007; 2009; 2011; 2013; 2015; 2017; 2019; 2022; 2023; 2025

Côte d'Ivoire competed at the 2013 World Championships in Athletics from August 10–18 in Moscow, Russia. It won 2 silver medals.

A team of 3 athletes was announced to represent the country in the event.

== Results ==
(q – qualified, NM – no mark, SB – season best)

Men

Athlete	Event	Preliminaries		Heats		Semifinals		Final	
Athlete	Event	Time	Rank	Time	Rank	Time	Rank	Time	Rank
Hua Wilfried Koffi	100 metres			10.40	39	did not advance			
Hua Wilfried Koffi	200 metres			DNS	NM	did not advance			

Women

Athlete	Event	Preliminaries		Heats		Semifinals		Final	
Athlete	Event	Time Width Height	Rank	Time Width Height	Rank	Time Width Height	Rank	Time Width Height	Rank
Murielle Ahouré	100 metres			11.22	12 Q	10.95	2 Q	10.93	2nd place, silver medalist(s)
