= Denmark at the 2011 World Championships in Athletics =

- WA code: DEN
- National federation: Dansk Atletik Forbund
- Website: www.dansk-atletik.dk

in Daegu
- Competitors: 6
- Medals: Gold 0 Silver 0 Bronze 0 Total 0

World Championships in Athletics appearances
- 1980; 1983; 1987; 1991; 1993; 1995; 1997; 1999; 2001; 2003; 2005; 2007; 2009; 2011; 2013; 2015; 2017; 2019; 2022; 2023

Denmark competed at the 2011 World Championships in Athletics from August 27 to September 4 in Daegu, South Korea. A team of 6 athletes was announced to represent the country in the event.

== Results ==
=== Men ===
Athlete	Event	Preliminaries		Heats		Semifinals		Final	
Athlete	Event	Time Width Height	Rank	Time Width Height	Rank	Time Width Height	Rank	Time Width Height	Rank
Andreas Bube	800 metres			1:46.64	14	1:45.48 PB	9	Did not advance	
Jesper Faurschou	Marathon							2:21.15	34
Anders Møller	Triple jump	16.14	22					Did not advance	
Kim Christensen	Shot put	19.74	17					Did not advance	

=== Women ===
Athlete	Event	Preliminaries		Heats		Semifinals		Final	
Athlete	Event	Time Width Height	Rank	Time Width Height	Rank	Time Width Height	Rank	Time Width Height	Rank
Sara Slott Petersen	400 m hurdles			56.32 q, NR	22	56.49	18	Did not advance	
Caroline Bonde Holm	Pole vault	4.25	25					Did not advance	
