= Chinese Taipei at the 2022 World Athletics Championships =

- WA code: TPE

in Eugene, United States 15 July 2022 – 24 July 2022
- Competitors: 3 (2 men and 1 woman) in 3 events
- Medals: Gold 0 Silver 0 Bronze 0 Total 0

World Athletics Championships appearances
- 1980; 1983; 1987; 1991; 1993; 1995; 1997; 1999; 2001; 2003; 2005; 2007; 2009; 2011; 2013; 2015; 2017; 2019; 2022; 2023

Chinese Taipei competed at the 2022 World Athletics Championships in Eugene, United States, from 15 to 24 July 2022.

== Results ==
Chinese Taipei entered 3 athletes.

Key

- Q = Qualified for the next round
- q = Qualified for the next round as a fastest loser or, in field events, by position without achieving the qualifying target
- NR = National record
- PB = Personal best
- SB = Season best
- N/A = Round not applicable for the event

=== Men ===
Track and road events

Athlete	Event	Heat		Semi-final		Final	
Athlete	Event	Result	Rank	Result	Rank	Result	Rank
Chen Kuei-ru	110 m hurdles	13.82	34	Did not advance			
Chen Chieh	400 m hurdles	50.28	27	Did not advance			

=== Women ===
Track and road events

Athlete	Event	Final	
Athlete	Event	Result	Rank
Tsao Chun-yu	Marathon	2:47:02 SB	31
