= Ivory Coast at the 2023 World Athletics Championships =

- Flag of Ivory Coast
- WA code: CIV

in Budapest, Hungary 19 August 2023 – 27 August 2023
- Competitors: 6 (1 man and 5 women)
- Medals: Gold 0 Silver 0 Bronze 0 Total 0

World Athletics Championships appearances
- 1980; 1983; 1987; 1991; 1993; 1995; 1997; 1999; 2001; 2003; 2005; 2007; 2009; 2011; 2013; 2015; 2017; 2019; 2022; 2023

Ivory Coast competed at the 2023 World Athletics Championships in Budapest, Hungary, from 19 to 27 August 2023.

== Results ==
Ivory Coast entered 6 athletes.

Key

- Q = Qualified for the next round
- q = Qualified for the next round as a fastest loser or, in field events, by position without achieving the qualifying target
- NR = National record
- PB = Personal best
- SB = Season best
- N/A = Round not applicable for the event

=== Men ===
Track and road events

| Athlete | Event | Heat | | Semifinal | | Final | |
| Athlete | Event | Result | Rank | Result | Rank | Result | Rank |
|---|---|---|---|---|---|---|---|
| Arthur Cissé | 100 metres | 11.58 | 8 | Did not advance | | | |

=== Women ===
Track and road events

| Athlete | Event | Heat | | Semifinal | | Final | |
| Athlete | Event | Result | Rank | Result | Rank | Result | Rank |
|---|---|---|---|---|---|---|---|
| Murielle Ahouré-Demps | 100 metres | 11.29 | 5 | Did not advance | | | |
| Maboundou Koné | 100 metres | 11.26 | 4 | Did not advance | | | |
| Marie Josée Ta Lou | 100 metres | 11.08 | 1 Q | 10.79 | 1 Q | 10.81 | 4 |
| Jessica Gbai | 200 metres | 22.78 | 3 Q | 22.88 | 6 | Did not advance | |
| Maboundou Koné | 200 metres | 22.55 | 2 Q | DQ | | Did not advance | |
| Marie Josée Ta Lou | 200 metres | 22.26 SB | 2 Q | 22.26 =SB | 3 q | 22.64 | 8 |
| Murielle Ahouré-Demps; Jessica Gbai; Maboundou Koné; Marie Josée Ta Lou | 4 × 100 metres relay | 41.90 AR | 2 Q | — | | DNF | |
