= Chinese Taipei at the 2013 World Championships in Athletics =

- WA code: TPE

in Moscow
- Competitors: 7
- Medals: Gold 0 Silver 0 Bronze 0 Total 0

World Championships in Athletics appearances
- 1980; 1983; 1987; 1991; 1993; 1995; 1997; 1999; 2001; 2003; 2005; 2007; 2009; 2011; 2013; 2015; 2017; 2019; 2022; 2023

Chinese Taipei is competing at the 2013 World Championships in Athletics in Moscow, Russia, from 10–18 August 2013. A team of 7 athletes was announced to represent the country in the event.

== Results ==
(q – qualified, NM – no mark, SB – season best)

=== Men ===
Athlete	Event	Preliminaries		Heats		Semifinals		Final	
Athlete	Event	Time	Rank	Time	Rank	Time	Rank	Time	Rank
Wang Wen-tang; Liu Yuan-kai; Pan Po-yu; Lo Yen-yao; Tu Chia-lin	4 × 100 metres relay			39.72	22			did not advance	
Chang Chia-che	Marathon							2:20:02	32

=== Women ===
Athlete	Event	Preliminaries		Heats		Semifinals		Final	
Athlete	Event	Time	Rank	Time	Rank	Time	Rank	Time	Rank
Chen Yu-hsuan	Marathon							DNF	–

- Athletes in italics did not race.
