= Ivory Coast at the 2017 World Championships in Athletics =

- WA code: CIV

in London
- Competitors: 4
- Medals Ranked 27th: Gold 0 Silver 2 Bronze 0 Total 2

World Championships in Athletics appearances
- 1980; 1983; 1987; 1991; 1993; 1995; 1997; 1999; 2001; 2003; 2005; 2007; 2009; 2011; 2013; 2015; 2017; 2019; 2022; 2023

Ivory Coast competed at the 2017 World Championships in Athletics in London, Great Britain, from 4–13 August 2017.

== Medalists ==
Medal	Name	Event	Date
Silver	Marie-Josée Ta Lou	Women's 100 metres	August 6
Silver	Marie-Josée Ta Lou	Women's 200 metres	August 11

== Results ==
(q – qualified, NM – no mark, SB – season best)

=== Men ===
Track and road events

Athlete	Event	Heat		Semifinal		Final	
Athlete	Event	Result	Rank	Result	Rank	Result	Rank
Ben Youssef Meïté	100 metres	10.02	3 Q	10.12	10	Did not advance	
Hua Wilfried Koffi	200 metres	20.49	16 q	20.80	23	Did not advance	

=== Women ===
Track and road events

Athlete	Event	Heat		Semifinal		Final	
Athlete	Event	Result	Rank	Result	Rank	Result	Rank
Murielle Ahouré	100 metres	11.00	2 Q	10.99	6 Q	10.98	4
Marie-Josée Ta Lou	100 metres	11.04	3 Q	10.87	2 Q	10.86 =PB	2nd place, silver medalist(s)
Marie-Josée Ta Lou	200 metres	22.70	3 Q	22.50	3 Q	22.08 NR	2nd place, silver medalist(s)
