= Christine Warden =

English hurdler

Christine Warden née Ηοwell
Personal information
- Nationality: British (English)
- Born: 26 December 1950 (age 74) England

Sport
- Sport: Athletics
- Event: hurdles
- Club: Wolves & Bilston AC

Christine Warden (née Ηοwell; born 26 December 1950) is an English former 400 metres hurdler.

== Biography ==
Born Christine Howell, she married Peter Warden in late 1973 and competed under her married name thereafter.

Warden became the British 400 metres hurdles champion after winning the British WAAA Championships title at the 1976 WAAA Championships in a national record time of 57.84 sec.

Warden regained the 400 metres WAAA title at the 1979 WAAA Championships. She also finished fourth representing Europe at the 1979 IAAF World Cup and reached the 1980 World Championship final. Her 400 m hurdles best of 56.06 seconds set in 1979, is a former British record and still ranks her in the UK all-time top 20.

Warden won a third WAAA title at the 1981 WAAA Championships.

== International competitions ==
Year	Competition	Venue	Position	Event	Notes
Representing Great Britain / Europe
1977	European Cup	Helsinki, Finland	5th	400 m hurdles	58.51
1979	European Cup	Turin, Italy	4th	400 m hurdles	57.24
1979	World Cup	Montreal, Canada	4th	400 m hurdles	57.20
1980	World Championships	Sittard, Netherlands	DQ (final)	400 m hurdles	57.26 (sf)

=== National titles ===
- 3 AAA Championships (1976, 1979, 1981)
- 2 UK Championships (1977, 1979)
