= Olga Commandeur =

Dutch television presenter and track and field athlete

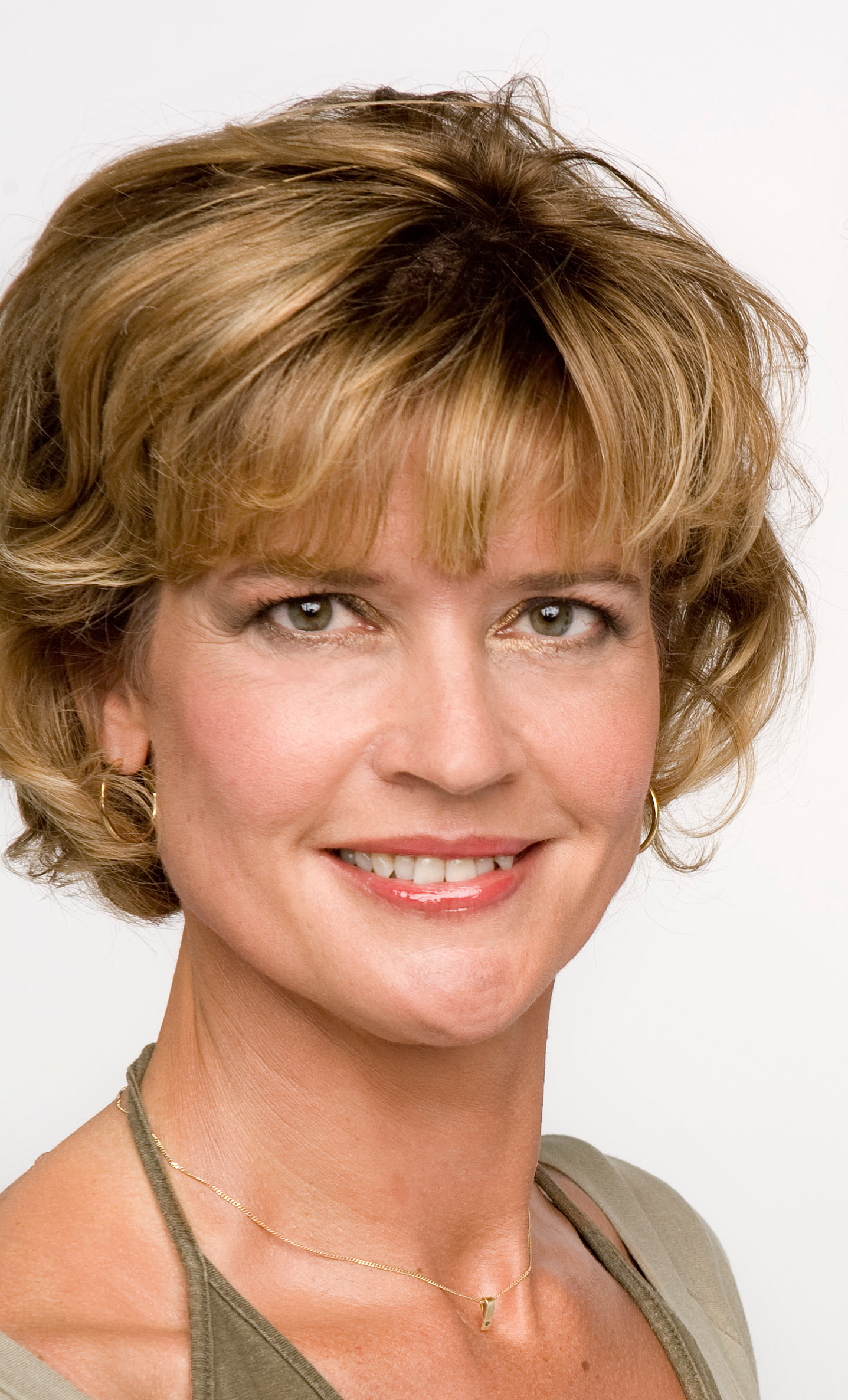
- Olga Commandeur in 2007

Personal information
- Born: 30 October 1958 (age 67) Velsen, the Netherlands
- Height: 1.71 m (5 ft 7 in)
- Weight: 64 kg (141 lb)

Sport
- Sport: Track and field
- Club: ADA, Amsterdam

Olga Alida Divera Commandeur (born 30 October 1958) is a Dutch television presenter and track and field athlete. She competed in the 400 metres hurdles at the 1984 Summer Olympics, but failed to reach the final. She won five national titles in this event in 1979, 1980, 1981, 1983 and 1984. She also won gold medals in the 800 metres at the 1975 European Athletics Junior Championships and 1977 national championships.

== Biography ==
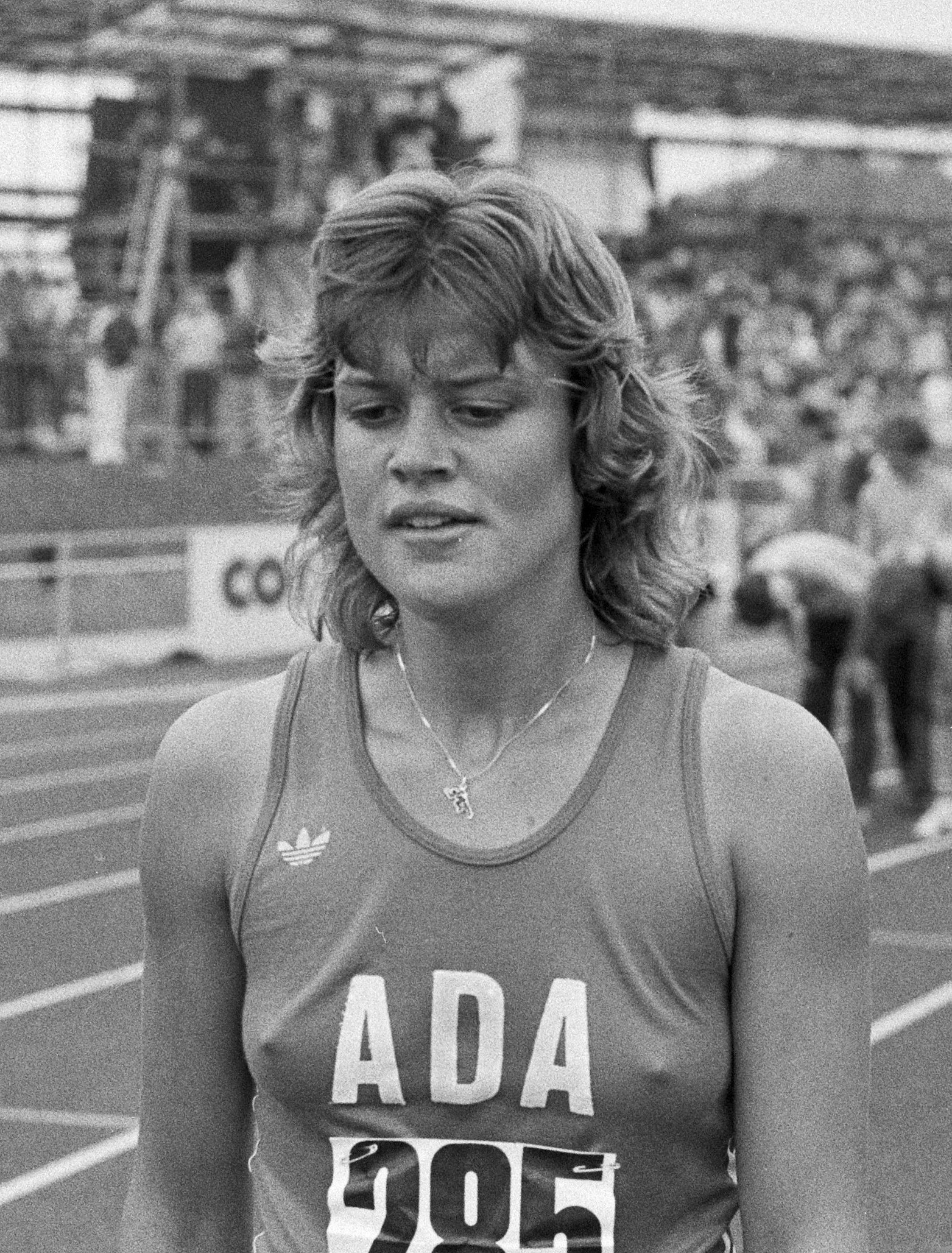
Commandeur in 1981

Commandeur started competing in athletics in 1973 and soon became a leading junior Dutch runner and javelin thrower. Next year she won national youth titles in the 800 m (indoor) and 300 m. In 1975 she finished second in the 400 metres senior Dutch championships. She later won the 800 m at the 1975 European Athletics Junior Championships in a time of 2:05.8. She shaved 4.2 s from it two weeks later in Aalst, setting a Dutch seniors record and a world youth record.

Commandeur missed the 1976 Olympics due to injuries that kept returning in 1977–1978. In early 1979 she focused on pentathlon (and later heptathlon) aiming for the 1980 Olympics. Next year she finished second in the national championships and did not qualify for the Games. Meanwhile, the 400 m hurdles, in which she was twice national champion, was not yet included to the Olympic program. She competed in this event at the 1980 World Championships in Athletics and later at the 1984 Olympics, but failed to reach the finals.

A few years after the Games she retired from competitions due to injuries and started her career as TV and radio personality. Between 1984 and 1991 she was involved with the morning exercise radio program "NOS Sport". In 1987 she married her long-time boyfriend Jaap Dekker and moved to Amstelveen. The couple has two children. From 2000 to 2007, together with Karl Noten she presented the morning gymnastics TV program Nederland in Beweging!. In parallel, she run her fitness company Olga Commandeur PROmotions. In 2020 she made a guest appearance in the second episode of the first season of Drag Race Holland.
