= Chinese Taipei at the 2019 World Athletics Championships =

Chinese Taipei at the 2019 World Championships in Athletics
- WA code: TPE

in Doha
- Competitors: 5 (5 men)

World Championships in Athletics appearances
- 1980; 1983; 1987; 1991; 1993; 1995; 1997; 1999; 2001; 2003; 2005; 2007; 2009; 2011; 2013; 2015; 2017; 2019; 2022; 2023

Chinese Taipei competed at the 2019 World Athletics Championships in Doha, Qatar, from 27 September–6 October 2019.

== Result ==
Key

- Note–Ranks given for track events are for the entire round
- Q = Qualified for the next round
- q = Qualified for the next round as a fastest loser or, in field events, by position without achieving the qualifying target
- NR = National record
- GR = Games record
- PB = Personal best
- SB = Season best
- DNF = Did not finish
- DNS = Did not start
- NM = No mark
- N/A = Round not applicable for the event
- Bye = Athlete not required to compete in round

=== Men ===
Track and road events

Athlete	Event	Heat		Semifinal		Final	
Athlete	Event	Result	Rank	Result	Rank	Result	Rank
Yang Chun-han	200 m	20.80	5	Did not advance			
Chen Kuei-ru	110 m hurdles	13.57	3 Q	13.52	5	Did not advance	
Chen Chieh	400 m hurdles	49.95	3 Q	50.05	8	Did not advance	

Field events

Athlete	Event	Qualification		Final	
Athlete	Event	Distance	Position	Distance	Position
Lin Chia-hsing	Long jump	NM	–	Did not advance	
Cheng Chao-tsun	Javelin throw	83.40	4 q	77.99	10
