= Karoline Nemetz =

Swedish runner

Medal record

Women's athletics

Representing Sweden

World Championships in Athletics
Silver medal – second place	1980 Sittard	3000 m

Karoline Nemetz (married name: Ettemark; born 28 June 1958) is a Swedish former middle- and long-distance runner.

Nemetz grew up in Eskilstuna and began competing in athletics and skiing. She eventually settled on running as her focus and made her breakthrough at national level in 1978 by winning the 1500 metres and 3000 metres titles at the Swedish Athletics Championships. She followed this up by retaining those titles the following season and also taking the cross country running short race title.

Nemetz won her first major medal at the 1980 World Championships in Athletics. This was a two-event competition created by the International Amateur Athletics Federation in response to the lack of the women's 400 metres hurdles and 3000 m run at the 1980 Summer Olympics. Nemetz took the 3000 m silver medal behind Birgit Friedmann. Her runner-up time of 8:50.22 minutes was a new Swedish record and she was the first to beat Inger Knutsson's Swedish time for that distance. Nemetz's time stood for almost sixteen years, at which point Sara Wedlund improved the mark by a second and a half. Nemetz also retained her Swedish short cross country title, but Katharina Jönnå and Birgit Bringslid took that year's Swedish track titles. She won the 3000 m at the 1980 DN Galan in Stockholm.

In 1981 Nemetz won her third 3000 m national title. She also set two further Swedish records: running 15:59.84 for the 5000 metres at the Bislett Games, and 2:37:06 hours for the marathon when placing sixth at the 1981 New York City Marathon. Nemetz was awarded the Stora grabbars märke award at the end of the season.

Her career abruptly came to a halt in 1982 as she suffered an Achilles tendon injury. The subsequent operation affected her ability to train and she retired from the sport.
