= Ivory Coast at the 2019 World Athletics Championships =

- WA code: CIV

in Doha, Qatar 27 September 2019 – 6 October 2019
- Competitors: 3 in 3 events
- Medals Ranked 31st: Gold 0 Silver 0 Bronze 1 Total 1

World Athletics Championships appearances
- 1980; 1983; 1987; 1991; 1993; 1995; 1997; 1999; 2001; 2003; 2005; 2007; 2009; 2011; 2013; 2015; 2017; 2019; 2022; 2023

Ivory Coast competed at the 2019 World Athletics Championships in Doha, Qatar, from 27 September to 6 October 2019.

== Medalists ==
Medal	Name	Event	Date
Bronze	Marie-Josee Ta Lou	Women's 100 m	29 September

== Results ==
Key

- Q = Qualified for the next round
- q = Qualified for the next round as a fastest loser or, in field events, by position without achieving the qualifying target
- NR = National record
- PB = Personal best
- SB = Season best
- N/A = Round not applicable for the event

=== Men ===
Track and road events

Athlete	Event	Heat		Semifinal		Final	
Athlete	Event	Result	Rank	Result	Rank	Result	Rank
Arthur Cissé	100 metres	10.14	13 Q	10.34	24	Did not advance	

=== Women ===
Track and road events

Athlete	Event	Heat		Semifinal		Final	
Athlete	Event	Result	Rank	Result	Rank	Result	Rank
Murielle Ahouré	100 metres	11.05 SB	4 Q	11.05 SB	5 Q	11.02 SB	5
Marie-Josée Ta Lou	100 metres	10.85 PB	2 Q	10.87	3 Q	10.90	3rd place, bronze medalist(s)
Marie-Josée Ta Lou	200 metres	DNS	–	Did not advance			
