= Chinese Taipei at the 2011 World Championships in Athletics =

- WA code: TPE
- National federation: Chinese Taipei Track & Field Association
- Website: www.cttfa.org.tw

in Daegu
- Competitors: 7
- Medals: Gold 0 Silver 0 Bronze 0 Total 0

World Championships in Athletics appearances
- 1980; 1983; 1987; 1991; 1993; 1995; 1997; 1999; 2001; 2003; 2005; 2007; 2009; 2011; 2013; 2015; 2017; 2019; 2022; 2023

Chinese Taipei competed at the 2011 World Championships in Athletics from August 27 to September 4 in Daegu, South Korea.

== Team selection ==
A team of 8 athletes was announced to represent the country in the event.

The following athletes appeared on the preliminary Entry List, but not on the Official Start List of the specific event, resulting in a total number of 7 competitors:

KEY:	Did not participate	Competed in another event

	Event	Athlete
Men	4 × 100 metres relay	Liang Tse-Ching

== Results ==
=== Men ===
Athlete	Event	Preliminaries		Heats		Semifinals		Final	
Athlete	Event	Time Width Height	Rank	Time Width Height	Rank	Time Width Height	Rank	Time Width Height	Rank
Wang Wen-Tang; Liu Yuan-Kai; Tsai Meng-Lin; Yi Wei-Chen	4 × 100 metres relay			39.30	17			Did not advance	
Lin Ching-hsuan	Long jump	7.30	29					Did not advance	
Chang Ming-Huang	Shot put	19.60	19					Did not advance	

=== Women ===
Athlete	Event	Preliminaries		Heats		Semifinals		Final	
Athlete	Event	Time Width Height	Rank	Time Width Height	Rank	Time Width Height	Rank	Time Width Height	Rank
Liao Ching-Hsien	100 metres	11.98	4 Q	12.15	41	Did not advance			
