= Hsieh Chien-ho =

Taiwanese long-distance runner

Hsieh Chien-Ho
Personal information
- Born: 25 November 1987 (age 38)

Sport
- Country: Chinese Taipei
- Sport: Track and field
- Event: long-distance running
- Updated on 2 September 2015

Hsieh Chien-ho (born 25 November 1987) is a Taiwanese long-distance runner. She competed in the marathon event at the 2015 World Championships in Athletics in Beijing, China.

On January 28, 2018, Hsieh placed fourth in the Osaka Half Marathon with a time of 1:12:19, breaking her own national record by three minutes.

== See also ==
- Chinese Taipei at the 2015 World Championships in Athletics
