= Ivory Coast at the 2022 World Athletics Championships =

- Flag of Ivory Coast
- WA code: CIV

in Eugene, United States 15 July 2022 – 24 July 2022
- Competitors: 6 (2 men and 4 women)
- Medals: Gold 0 Silver 0 Bronze 0 Total 0

World Athletics Championships appearances
- 1980; 1983; 1987; 1991; 1993; 1995; 1997; 1999; 2001; 2003; 2005; 2007; 2009; 2011; 2013; 2015; 2017; 2019; 2022; 2023

Ivory Coast competed at the 2022 World Athletics Championships in Eugene, United States, from 15 to 24 July 2022.

== Results ==
Ivory Coast entered 6 athletes, all sprinters.

Key

- Q = Qualified for the next round
- q = Qualified for the next round as a fastest loser or, in field events, by position without achieving the qualifying target
- NR = National record
- PB = Personal best
- SB = Season best
- N/A = Round not applicable for the event

=== Men ===
Track and road events

Athlete	Event	Preliminary		Heat		Semi-final		Final	
Athlete	Event	Result	Rank	Result	Rank	Result	Rank	Result	Rank
Arthur Cissé	100 metres	bye		10.02 Q	9	10.16	15	did not advance	
Ismael Kone	100 metres	bye		10.17	25	did not advance			

=== Women ===
Track and road events

Athlete	Event	Heat		Semi-final		Final	
Athlete	Event	Result	Rank	Result	Rank	Result	Rank
Murielle Ahouré	100 metres	11.16 q	19	11.25	20	did not advance	
Marie-Josée Ta Lou	100 metres	10.92 Q	3	10.87 Q	3	10.93	7
Marie-Josée Ta Lou	200 metres	DNS		did not advance			
Jessika Gbai	200 metres	22.89 q	20	22.84	18		
Maboundou Koné	200 metres	23.32	31	did not advance			
