= Ivory Coast at the 2015 World Championships in Athletics =

- WA code: CIV

in Beijing
- Competitors: 4
- Medals: Gold 0 Silver 0 Bronze 0 Total 0

World Championships in Athletics appearances
- 1980; 1983; 1987; 1991; 1993; 1995; 1997; 1999; 2001; 2003; 2005; 2007; 2009; 2011; 2013; 2015; 2017; 2019; 2022; 2023

Ivory Coast competed at the 2015 World Championships in Athletics in Beijing, China, from 22 to 30 August 2015.

== Results ==
(q – qualified, NM – no mark, SB – season best, w – wind assisted)

=== Men ===
Track and road events

Athlete	Event	Heat		Semifinal		Final	
Athlete	Event	Result	Rank	Result	Rank	Result	Rank
Ben Youssef Meïté	100 metres	10.05 NR	14 Q	10.17	18	Did not advance	
Hua Wilfried Koffi	100 metres	10.29	35	Did not advance			
Hua Wilfried Koffi	200 metres	20.39 SB	24	Did not advance			

=== Women ===
Track and road events

Athlete	Event	Heat		Semifinal		Final	
Athlete	Event	Result	Rank	Result	Rank	Result	Rank
Murielle Ahouré	100 metres	11.10	11 Q	10.98	9	Did not advance	
Marie-Josée Ta Lou	100 metres	10.95w	3 Q	11.04 PB	10	Did not advance	
Marie-Josée Ta Lou	200 metres	22.73 PB	6 Q	22.56 PB	9	Did not advance	
