= Ivory Coast at the 1983 World Championships in Athletics =

- Flag of Ivory Coast
- WA code: CIV

in Helsinki, Finland August 7–14, 1983
- Competitors: 6 (5 men and 1 woman) in 4 events
- Medals: Gold 0 Silver 0 Bronze 0 Total 0

World Championships in Athletics appearances
- 1980; 1983; 1987; 1991; 1993; 1995; 1997; 1999; 2001; 2003; 2005; 2007; 2009; 2011; 2013; 2015; 2017; 2019; 2022; 2023

Ivory Coast competed at the 1983 World Championships in Athletics in Helsinki, Finland, from August 7 to 14, 1983.

== Men ==
Track and road events

Athlete	Event	Heat		Quarterfinal		Semifinal		Final	
Athlete	Event	Result	Rank	Result	Rank	Result	Rank	Result	Rank
Gabriel Tiacoh	400 metres	47.11	26 q	46.22	12	Did not advance			
Georges Kablan Degnan; Kouadio Otokpa; Avognan Nogboun; Gabriel Tiacoh	4 × 100 metres relay	40.70	19	—		Did not advance			
Georges Kablan Degnan; René Djédjémel Mélédjé; Avognan Nogboun; Gabriel Tiacoh	4 × 400 metres relay	3:09.23	=14	—		Did not advance			

== Women ==
Track and road events

Athlete	Event	Heat		Semifinal		Final	
Athlete	Event	Result	Rank	Result	Rank	Result	Rank
Célestine N'Drin	800 metres	2:12.52	15 Q	2:08.14	15	Did not advance	
