= Geri Fitch =

Canadian long-distance runner

Personal information
- Full name: Geraldine Fitch
- Born: 7 April 1954 (age 72) Toronto, Ontario, Canada

Sport
- Sport: Long-distance running
- Event: 3000 metres

Geraldine Fitch (born 7 April 1954) is a Canadian long-distance runner. She competed in the women's 3000 metres at the 1984 Summer Olympics.
