= Ivory Coast at the 2009 World Championships in Athletics =

- WA code: CIV

in Berlin
- Competitors: 2 (1 man, 1 woman)
- Medals: Gold 0 Silver 0 Bronze 0 Total 0

World Championships in Athletics appearances
- 1980; 1983; 1987; 1991; 1993; 1995; 1997; 1999; 2001; 2003; 2005; 2007; 2009; 2011; 2013; 2015; 2017; 2019; 2022; 2023

Ivory Coast competed at the 2009 World Championships in Athletics from 15–23 August in Berlin. Neither of the two athletes advanced beyond the qualifying round in their event.

== Team selection ==
Track and road events

Event	Athletes	
Event	Men	Women
100 metres	Ben Youssef Meité	

Field and combined events

Event	Athletes	
Event	Men	Women
Discus throw		Kazai Suzanne Kragbé

== Results ==
=== Men ===
Track and road events

Event	Athletes	Heats		Quarterfinals		Semifinal		Final	
Event	Athletes	Result	Rank	Result	Rank	Result	Rank	Result	Rank
100 m	Ben Youssef Meité	10.41	37	did not advance					

=== Women ===
Field and combined events

Event	Athletes	Qualification		Final	
Event	Athletes	Result	Rank	Result	Rank
Discus throw	Kazai Suzanne Kragbé	53.84 NR	35	did not advance	
