= Penny Werthner =

Personal information
- Born: July 5, 1951 (age 74) Ottawa, Canada

Sport
- Sport: Track and field
Medal record
Representing Canada
Women's Athletics
Commonwealth Games
Bronze medal – third place	1978 Edmonton	1.500 metres
Pan American Games
Bronze medal – third place	1971 Cali	800 metres
Bronze medal – third place	1979 San Juan	1.500 metres

Penny Christine Werthner-Bales (born July 5, 1951) is a retired female track and field athlete, who represented Canada at the 1976 Summer Olympics in the women's 1.500 metres. She claimed the bronze medal in the women's 800 metres event at the 1971 Pan American Games in Cali, Colombia, followed by a bronze in the 1.500 metres in 1979.

Werthner sat as the Dean of the faculty of Kinesiology before she became interim Provost and Vice-President Academic of the University of Calgary. She is married to John Bales, President of the Coaching Association of Canada.

Werthner is one of Canada's most distinguished consultants in the field of sport psychology and recognized as one of CAAWS Top 20 Most Influential Women in Sport and Physical Activity. She joined the University of Calgary after spending 12 years at the University of Ottawa where she was Director and Associate Dean for the School of Human Kinetics from 2011–2012. An Olympic athlete herself in track and field, she has served as a sport psychology consultant for national and Olympic teams since 1985, including as an advisor to the Canadian Olympic Committee on Sport Psychology for the 2008 Beijing Olympic Team and the 2004 Athens Olympic Team. She continues to work with numerous national level sport organizations and athletes in addition to supersivising sport psychology research being conducted at the University of Calgary.

Werthner earned her BA from McMaster University, and her MA and PhD from the University of Ottawa.

She has written dozens of peer-reviewed papers and parts of books. She serves as a reviewer for various journals, such as Qualitative Research in Sport and Exercise, and Journal of Applied Sport Psychology, and is a member of the editorial board of the Canadian Journal for Women in Coaching. She is the current Chair of the Canadian Sport Psychology Association (CSPA/ACPS), is a member of the International Council for Coach Education, is an advisor to the Coaching Association of Canada Women in Coaching Program and is a learning facilitator for the National Coaching Certificate Program (NCCP).

Werthner-Bales resides in Calgary, Alberta with her husband John. They have two children.
