= Birgit Friedmann =

West German distance runner (born 1960)

Personal information
- Born: 8 April 1960 (age 66) Königstein im Taunus, West Germany
- Occupation: West German distance runner
Medal record
Women's athletics
Representing West Germany
World Championships in Athletics
Gold medal – first place	1980 Sittard	3000 m

Birgit Friedmann (born 8 April 1960) is a German former middle- and long-distance runner who competed in the 1500 metres and 3000 metres for West Germany.

Born in Königstein im Taunus, she made her first major appearance for West Germany at the 1977 European Athletics Junior Championships, where she finished seventh in the 1500 m. The following year she won the national title in the 3000 m at the West German Athletics Championships and was also runner-up to Brigitte Kraus in the 1500 m. She was selected to run the longer event at the 1978 European Athletics Championships, but failed to finish the race. She represented her country at the 1979 IAAF World Cross Country Championships and came 71st while the West German women placed fourth overall.

Friedmann had her greatest success in 1980. She won the West German title in the 3000 m with a run of 9:02 minutes. This gained her selection for the 1980 World Championships in Athletics – a two-event competition created by the International Amateur Athletics Federation in response to the lack of the women's 400 metres hurdles and 3000 m run at the 1980 Summer Olympics. Friedmann defeated all-comers at the competition and became the first ever women's 3000 m world champion with a personal best run of 8:48.05 minutes (also a West German record). The year after she won her third 3000 m national title and also placed third in the 1500 m. She also won the semi-final 1981 European Cup competition.

At the 1982 European Athletics Championships Friedmann achieved a West German and world junior record of 8:43.65 for the 3000 m, but this was only enough for fifth place. She also competed over 1500 m at that championships, but was some way behind the winner in eleventh place. The 1982 season was her last as an athlete and she won her fourth and final national title that year.

During her career she was affiliated with Eintracht Frankfurt and was 1.66 m tall and weighed 51 kg.

Following her retirement from athletics she trained in sports medicine. She is the chief physician of the Sports Medicine Ward of the University Clinic in Heidelberg. In 2006, she co-authored a training manual, with fellow former athletes Herbert Steffny and Markus Keller, called Marathontraining für Frauen (Marathon Training for Women).
