= Ellen Fiedler =

East German hurdler (born 1958)

Medal record

Women's athletics

Representing East Germany

Olympic Games
Bronze medal – third place	1988 Seoul	400 m hurdles

World Championships
Silver medal – second place	1980 Sittard	400 m hurdles
Bronze medal – third place	1983 Helsinki	400 m hurdles
Gold medal – first place	1983 Helsinki	4 × 400 m relay

Ellen Fiedler (née Neumann; 26 November 1958 in Demmin, Mecklenburg-Vorpommern) is a former East German 400 metres hurdler.

She won the bronze medal at the 1988 Summer Olympics in Seoul, in a career best time of 53.63 seconds. This ranks her third among German 400 m hurdlers, only behind Sabine Busch and Cornelia Ullrich.

She also won the 1981 IAAF World Cup event, took the silver medal in the hurdles at the 1980 World Championships in Athletics, won the bronze medal at the 1983 World Championships and finished sixth at the 1986 European Championships. At the 1983 World Championships she also won a gold medal in the 4 × 400 metres relay. Although it was Gesine Walther, Sabine Busch, Marita Koch and Dagmar Rübsam who ran in the final, Fiedler had run in the qualifying round.

Fiedler represented the sports club SC Dynamo Berlin, and became the East German champion in 1981, 1982 and 1983.

Fiedler is 1.76 metres tall; during her active career she weighed 66 kg.

== International competitions ==
Year	Competition	Venue	Position	Event	Notes
1980	World Championships	Sittard, Netherlands	2nd	400 m hurdles	54.56
1981	European Cup	Zagreb, Yugoslavia	1st	400 m hurdles	54.90
1981	World Cup	Rome, Italy	1st	400 m hurdles	54.82
1983	World Championships	Helsinki, Finland	3rd	400 m hurdles	54.55
1983	World Championships	Helsinki, Finland	1st	4 × 400 m relay	3:29.05 (heats)
1983	European Cup	London, United Kingdom	1st	400 m hurdles	54.20
1986	Goodwill Games	Moscow, Soviet Union	3rd	400 m hurdles	54.80
1986	European Championships	Stuttgart, Germany	6th	400 m hurdles	54.90
1988	Olympic Games	Seoul, South Korea	3rd	400 m hurdles	53.63

Sporting positions
Preceded by Karin Roßley	Women's 400 m Hurdles Best Year Performance; 1981	Succeeded by Ann-Louise Skoglund
