= Juan Manuel Cano =

Argentine racewalker (born 1987)

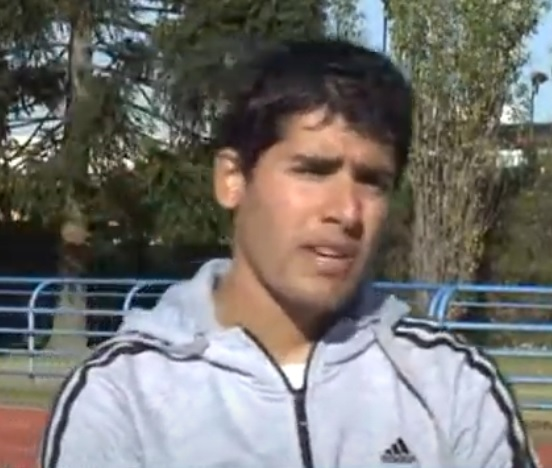

Personal information
- Full name: Juan Manuel Cano Ceres
- Born: 12 December 1987 (age 38) San Miguel de Tucumán, Tucumán, Argentina
- Height: 1.68 m (5 ft 6 in)
- Weight: 57 kg (126 lb)

Sport
- Country: Argentina
- Sport: Athletics
- Event: Racewalking
Medal record
Men's Racewalking
Representing Argentina
South American Championships
Bronze medal – third place	2007 São Paulo	20,000 m
- Updated on 13 May 2015

Juan Manuel Cano Ceres (born 12 December 1987 in San Miguel de Tucumán) is an Argentine racewalker. He was raised in La Banda, Santiago del Estero. He competed in the 20 km walk at the 2008, 2012 and 2016 Summer Olympics. At the 2012 Olympics, he placed 22nd with a time of 1:22:10, an Argentine national record.

He has also represented Argentina at the 2009, 2011, 2013 and 2015 World Athletics Championships.

== Personal bests ==
Event	Result	Venue	Date
Road walk
10 km	40:35 min	(United Kingdom) London	4 August 2012
20 km	1:22:10 hrs	(United Kingdom) London	4 August 2012
Track walk
5000 m	21:39.92 min	(Argentina) Mar del Plata	21 March 2009
10,000 m	40:05.53 min	(Argentina) Rosario	20 June 2014
20,000 m	1:22:18.5 hrs (ht)	(Argentina) Buenos Aires	25 January 2014

== Competition record ==
Year	Competition	Venue	Position	Event	Notes
Representing Argentina
2004	South American Race Walking Championships (U18)	Los Ángeles, Bío Bío, Chile	–	10 km walk	DQ
2005	South American Junior Championships	Rosario, Argentina	3rd	10,000 m track walk	43:03.34
2006	South American Race Walking Championships (U20)	Cochabamba, Bolivia	1st	10 km walk	45:39
2006	World Race Walking Cup (U20)	A Coruña, Spain	9th	10 km walk	43:25
2006	World Junior Championships	Beijing, China	10th	10,000 m track walk	45:09.42
2006	South American U23 Championships / South American Games	Buenos Aires, Argentina	—	20,000 m track walk	DQ
2007	Pan American Race Walking Cup	Balneário Camboriú, Brazil	12th	20 km walk	1:35:40
2007	South American Championships	São Paulo, Brazil	3rd	20,000 m track walk	1:28:28.47
2007	Pan American Games	Rio de Janeiro, Brazil	9th	20 km walk	1:34.45
2008	South American Race Walking Championships	Cuenca, Ecuador	7th	20 km walk	1:30:40 A
2008	World Race Walking Cup	Cheboksary, Russia	65th	20 km walk	1:26:36
2008	Ibero-American Championships	Iquique, Chile	2nd	20,000 m track walk	1:24:19.20
2008	Olympic Games	Beijing, China	40th	20 km walk	1:27:17
2008	South American Under-23 Championships	Lima, Peru	1st	20,000 m track walk	1:26:37
2009	South American Championships	Lima, Peru	6th	20,000 m track walk	1:28:34.8
2009	World Championships	Berlin, Germany	40th	20 km walk	1:29:20
2010	Ibero-American Championships	San Fernando, Spain	6th	20,000 m track walk	1:27:51.8
2011	South American Championships	Buenos Aires, Argentina	6th	20,000 m track walk	1:23:09.0 (ht)
2011	World Championships	Daegu, South Korea	36th	20 km walk	1:30:00
2011	Pan American Games	Guadalajara, Mexico	9th	20 km walk	1:27:33 A
2012	World Race Walking Cup	Saransk, Russia	67th	20 km walk	1:28:12
2012	Ibero-American Championships	Barquisimeto, Venezuela	4th	20,000 m track walk	1:31:41.24
2012	Olympic Games	London, United Kingdom	22nd	20 km walk	1:22:10
2013	South American Championships	Cartagena, Colombia	5th	20,000 m track walk	1:30:16.98
2013	World Championships	Moscow, Russia	46th	20 km walk	1:30:45
2014	South American Games	Santiago, Chile	6th	20,000 m track walk	1:24:45.0
2014	Ibero-American Championships	São Paulo, Brazil	—	20,000 m track walk	DQ
2015	Pan American Race Walking Cup	Arica, Chile	13th	20 km walk	1:25:42
2015	South American Championships	Lima, Peru	2nd	20,000 m track walk	1:23:56.00
2015	World Championships	Beijing, China	42nd	20 km walk	1:27:10
2016	Ibero-American Championships	Rio de Janeiro, Brazil	2nd	20,000 m track walk	1:27:27.7
2016	Olympic Games	Rio de Janeiro, Brazil	51st	20 km walk	1:27:27
2017	South American Championships	Asunción, Paraguay	4th	20,000 m track walk	1:26:45.1
2017	World Championships	London, United Kingdom	46th	20 km walk	1:24:49
2018	Ibero-American Championships	Trujillo, Peru	3rd	20,000 m track walk	1:24:07.00
2019	South American Championships	Lima, Peru	4th	20,000 m track walk	1:26:19.9
2021	South American Championships	Guayaquil, Ecuador	4th	20,000 m track walk	1:25:48.03
2022	Ibero-American Championships	La Nucía, Spain	7th	10,000 m track walk	41:32.71
2022	South American Games	Asunción, Paraguay	4th	35 km walk	2:39:56
2023	South American Championships	São Paulo, Brazil	4th	20,000 m track walk	1:24:01.1
2023	World Championships	Budapest, Hungary	45th	20 km walk	1:27:29
2023	Pan American Games	Santiago, Chile	12th	20 km walk	1:28:28
2024	Ibero-American Championships	Cuiabá, Brazil	–	20 km walk	DQ
2025	South American Championships	Mar del Plata, Argentina	5th	20 km walk	1:29:18
2026	Ibero-American Championships	Lima, Peru	5th	10,000 m track walk	43:27.95
