= Murielle Ahouré-Demps =

Ivorian sprinter (born 1987)

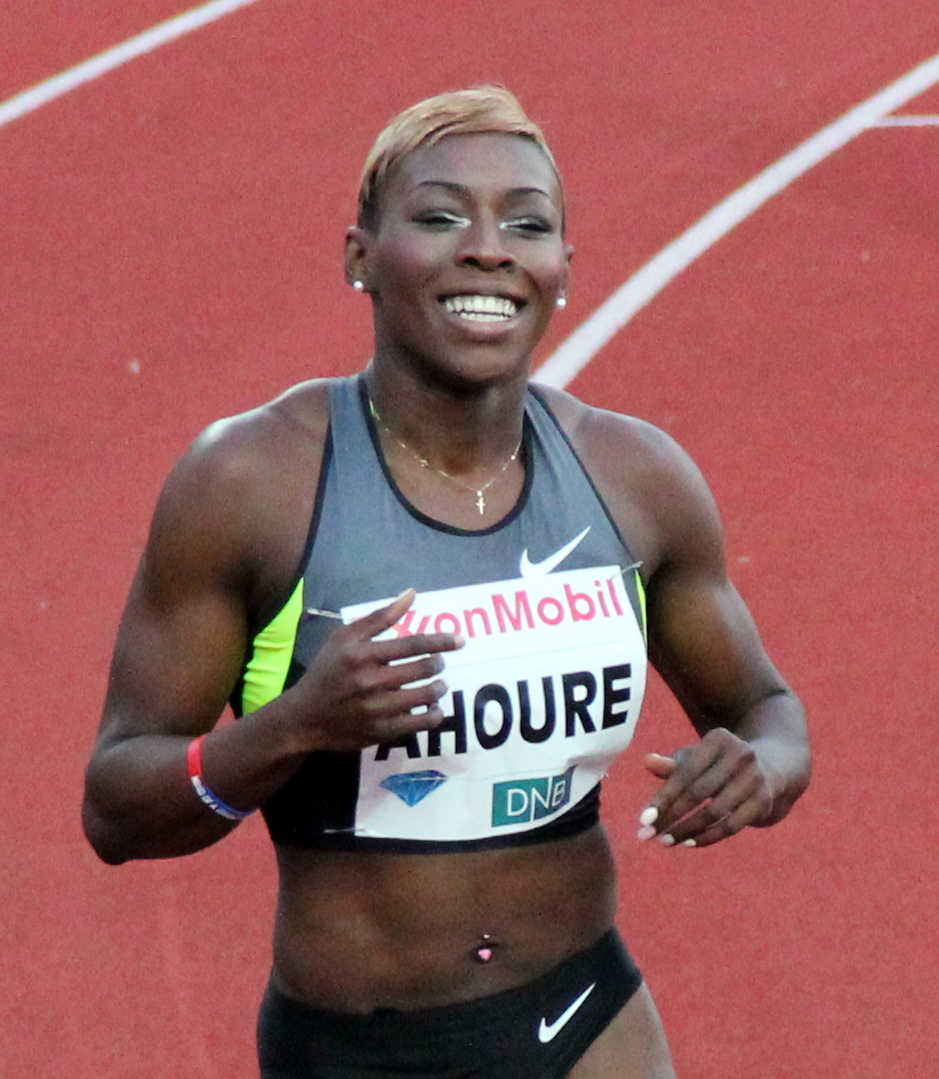
- Murielle Ahouré in 2012

Personal information
- Born: 23 August 1987 (age 39) Abidjan, Ivory Coast
- Height: 1.68 m (5 ft 6 in)
- Weight: 58 kg (128 lb)

Sport
- Country: Ivory Coast
- Sport: Athletics
- Events: 60 metres, 100 m, 200 m
Medal record
Women's athletics
Representing Ivory Coast
World Championships
Silver medal – second place	2013 Moscow	100 m
Silver medal – second place	2013 Moscow	200 m
World Indoor Championships
Gold medal – first place	2018 Birmingham	60 m
Silver medal – second place	2012 Istanbul	60 m
Silver medal – second place	2014 Sopot	60 m
African Championships
Gold medal – first place	2014 Marrakesh	200 m
Gold medal – first place	2016 Durban	100 m
Silver medal – second place	2014 Marrakesh	100 m
Bronze medal – third place	2016 Durban	4×100 m

Murielle Ahouré-Demps, née Murielle Ahouré, (23 August 1987) is an Ivorian sprinter who competes in the 60 meters, 100 m and 200 m. She was a double silver medalist at the 2013 world championships in Moscow. She came second in both the 100 and 200 meters at this event. Ahouré was the gold medallist in the 60 m at the 2018 IAAF World Indoor Championships.

She also won a silver medal at 60 metres event at 2012 IAAF World Indoor Championships in Istanbul, Turkey. She was the 2009 NCAA Indoor Champion at 200 metres while running for the University of Miami. Ahouré's personal best at 100 m is 10.78 (Montverde, USA, 2016) and in 200 m 22.24 (Monaco, 2013).

She holds African records in 60 m and 200 metres indoor. At the 2012 Summer Olympics she placed sixth in the 200 m and seventh in the 100 m.

She ran under seven seconds for the 60 metres for the first time in February 2013, becoming the eighth fastest woman ever with her time of 6.99 seconds. In 2018 she won the gold medal in the 60 m at the 2018 IAAF World Indoor Championships, and broke the African record with a time of 6.97 seconds (sixth fastest woman ever).

== Early life and career ==
The daughter of General Mathias Doué, Chief of Staff of the Armed Forces of the Ivory Coast, Ahouré travelled a lot in her early life, living in France, China, Japan and Germany, before moving to the United States at the age of 14. She took up athletics in her second year at high school, mostly as a way to make friends. After high school, she studied criminal law at George Mason University. In her final year at university, she transferred to the University of Miami to work with Amy Deem. She took the 2009 NCAA indoor 200 m title, with a then world's best time. That year. she also twice broke the Ivory Coast 100 m record outdoors.

In 2010, she moved to Houston after an injury-marred start to the season. She went to train under Allen Powell. In 2011, she again broke the Ivorian record.

== International career ==
In 2012, she made her international debut for the Ivory Coast at the World Indoor Championships, winning a silver medal in the 60 m, with a new personal best. This was the first World Indoor Athletics for the Ivory Coast. Despite breaking the Ivorian 100 m record again, she was unable to win a medal at the 2012 Summer Olympics.

In the 2013 indoor athletics season, she broke the African 60 m indoor record with a time of 7.00 seconds. She was undefeated for the entire indoor season. At the 2013 World Athletics Championships, the 200 m was expected to be her stronger event, but she also managed to edge out defending champion Carmelita Jeter to win silver behind Shelly-Ann Fraser-Pryce in the 100 m. In doing so, she became the first Ivorian to win a World Athletics Championships medal and the first African woman to win a medal in the 100 or 200 m at the World Championships. For her successes, she was awarded the rank of Chevalier of the National Order of Merit by President Alassane Ouattara. She was also named the Ivory Coast's best sportsperson of the year.

At the 2014 African Championships, she lost the 100 m to Blessing Okagbare, but won the 200 m which Okagbare did not participate in.

In 2015, Ahouré won her first Diamond League 100 m at the Oslo meeting. At the World Championships that year, she did not make the 100 m final after finishing 4th in her semi-final, and in doing so aggravated a knee injury which prevented her from running the 200 m.

The knee injury prevented her from training for eight months, causing her to miss the 2016 indoor season. She also moved training group, to Dennis Mitchell's group in Florida. In March 2016 Ahouré launched her foundation which aims to help bring back sport in school, assist children's education and empower underprivileged women and children. In June, she claimed the African 100 m record from Blessing Okagbare.

== Achievements ==
Year	Competition	Venue	Position	Event	Notes
Representing Ivory Coast
2012	World Indoor Championships	Istanbul, Turkey	2nd	60 m	7.04
2012	Olympic Games	London, United Kingdom	7th	100 m	11.00
2012	Olympic Games	London, United Kingdom	6th	200 m	22.57
2013	World Championships	Moscow, Russia	2nd	100 m	10.93
2013	World Championships	Moscow, Russia	2nd	200 m	22.32
2014	World Indoor Championships	Sopot, Poland	2nd	60 m	7.01
2014	African Championships	Durban, South Africa	2nd	100 m	11.03
2014	African Championships	Durban, South Africa	1st	200 m	22.36
2015	World Championships	Beijing, China	9th (sf)	100 m	10.98
2016	African Championships	Durban, South Africa	1st	100 m	10.99
2016	African Championships	Durban, South Africa	3rd	4 × 100 m relay	44.29
2016	Olympic Games	Rio de Janeiro, Brazil	10th (sf)	100 m	11.01
2016	Olympic Games	Rio de Janeiro, Brazil	12th (sf)	200 m	22.59
2017	World Championships	London, United Kingdom	4th	100 m	10.98
2018	World Indoor Championships	Birmingham, United Kingdom	1st	60 m	6.97
2019	World Championships	Doha, Qatar	5th	100 m	11.02
2021	Olympic Games	Tokyo, Japan	19th (sf)	100 m	11.28
2022	World Championships	Eugene, United States	20th (sf)	100 m	11.25
2023	World Championships	Budapest, Hungary	28th (h)	100 m	11.29
2023	World Championships	Budapest, Hungary	3rd (h)	4 × 100 m relay	41.90^{1}
2024	Olympic Games	Paris, France	–	4 × 100 m relay	DQ

^{1}Did not finish in the final

== Personal bests ==
Type	Event	Time	Date	Place	Notes
Outdoor	100 metres	10.78	11 June 2016	Montverde, United States	
Outdoor	200 metres	22.24	19 July 2013	Monaco	
Indoor	60 metres	6.97	2 March 2018	Birmingham, United Kingdom	6th of all time, AR

- All information taken from IAAF profile.

Records
Preceded by (Nigeria) Blessing Okagbare	Women's 100 m African Record Holder; 11 June 2016 – present	Succeeded by Incumbent
Olympic Games
Preceded by Ben Youssef Meïté	Flagbearer for Ivory Coast; Rio de Janeiro 2016	Succeeded by Marie-Josée Ta Lou & Cheick Sallah Cissé
