= Denmark at the 2007 World Championships in Athletics =

Denmark competed at the 2007 World Championships in Athletics with 5 athletes.

== Results ==
=== Men ===
==== Long jump ====
- Qualification Group A

Pos	Bib	Athlete	Mark	Q?	Wind
15	482	Morten Jensen	7.53	-	0.6

==== Triple jump ====
- Qualification Group A

Pos	Bib	Athlete	Mark	Q?	Wind	
12	483	Anders Møller	16.39	-	0.2	SB

==== Shot put ====
- Qualification Group A

Pos	Bib	Athlete	Mark	Q?
2	484	Joachim Olsen	20.62	Q

- Final

Pos	Bib	Athlete	Mark
	484	Joachim Olsen	NM

=== Women ===
==== 800m ====
- Heat 4

Pos	Lane	Bib	Athlete	Mark	Q?	
6	8	383	Rikke Rønholt	2:03.75	-	SB

== Competitors ==
=== Men ===
- Long jump: Morten Jensen
- Triple jump: Anders Møller
- Shot put: Joachim Olsen

=== Women ===
- 800m: Rikke Rønholt
- Marathon: Annemette Aagaard
