= 2013 World Championships in Athletics – Men's 4 × 100 metres relay =

Men's 4 × 100 metres relay at the 2013 World Championships
- Venue: Luzhniki Stadium
- Dates: 18 August (heats & final)
- Competitors: 92 from 23 nations
- Winning time: 37.36

Medalists
gold medal	Nesta Carter; Kemar Bailey-Cole; Nickel Ashmeade; Usain Bolt; Warren Weir*; Oshane Bailey*	Jamaica
silver medal	Charles Silmon; Mike Rodgers; Mookie Salaam; Justin Gatlin	United States
bronze medal	Gavin Smellie; Aaron Brown; Dontae Richards-Kwok; Justyn Warner	Canada

Official Video

The men's 4 × 100 metres relay at the 2013 World Championships in Athletics was held at the Luzhniki Stadium on 18 August.

Out of the blocks USA took the lead, passing first and building a small lead. A small lead is not adequate when Jamaica has Usain Bolt on the anchor. During the third handoff, Justin Gatlin seemed to go wide while struggling to get the baton, still in the lead while Jamaica had a smoother handoff. Once free of the technicalities, the multi gold medalist easily pulled away for the win. Great Britain finished the race in third place but were disqualified after passing the baton outside the takeover zone on the second changeover. Canada then took the bronze.

== Records ==
Prior to the competition, the records were as follows:

World record	Jamaica (Nesta Carter, Michael Frater, Yohan Blake, Usain Bolt)	36.84	(United Kingdom) London, Great Britain	11 August 2012
Championship record	Jamaica (Nesta Carter, Michael Frater, Yohan Blake, Usain Bolt)	37.04	Daegu, South Korea	4 September 2011
World Leading	United States Red (Charles Silmon, Michael Rodgers, Rakeem Salaam, Justin Gatlin)	37.58	Monaco	19 July 2013
African record	Nigeria (Osmond Ezinwa, Olapade Adeniken, Francis Obikwelu, Davidson Ezinwa)	37.94	Athens, Greece	9 August 1997
Asian record	Japan (Nobuharu Asahara, Shinji Takahira, Shingo Suetsugu, Naoki Tsukahara)	38.03	Osaka, Japan	1 September 2007
North, Central American and Caribbean record	Jamaica (Nesta Carter, Michael Frater, Yohan Blake, Usain Bolt)	36.84	(United Kingdom) London, Great Britain	11 August 2012
South American record	Brazil (Vicente de Lima, Édson Ribeiro, André da Silva, Claudinei da Silva)	37.90	Sydney, Australia	30 September 2000
European record	Great Britain (Jason Gardener, Darren Campbell, Marlon Devonish, Dwain Chambers)	37.73	Sevilla, Spain	29 August 1999
Oceanian record	Australia (Paul Henderson, Tim Jackson, Steve Brimacombe, Damien Marsh)	38.17	Gothenburg, Sweden	12 August 1995
Oceanian record	Australia (Anthony Alozie, Isaac Ntiamoah, Andrew McCabe, Josh Ross)	38.17	(United Kingdom) London, Great Britain	10 August 2012

== Qualification standards ==
A time	B time
39.20

== Schedule ==
Date	Time	Round
18 August 2013	16:50	Heats
18 August 2013	18:40	Final

All times are local times (UTC+4)

== Results ==
KEY:	q	Fastest non-qualifiers	Q	Qualified	NR	National record	PB	Personal best	SB	Seasonal best

=== Heats ===
Qualification: First 2 of each heat (Q) plus the 2 fastest times (q) advanced to the final.

Rank	Heat	Lane	Nation	Athletes	Time	Notes
1	2	4	United States	Charles Silmon, Mike Rodgers, Mookie Salaam, Justin Gatlin	38.06	Q
2	1	2	Great Britain & N.I.	Richard Kilty, Harry Aikines-Aryeetey, James Ellington, Dwain Chambers	38.12	Q, SB
3	3	7	Germany	Lucas Jakubczyk, Sven Knipphals, Julian Reus, Martin Keller	38.13	Q, SB
4	1	3	Jamaica	Nesta Carter, Kemar Bailey-Cole, Warren Weir, Oshane Bailey	38.17	Q
5	2	2	Japan	Yoshihide Kiryu, Kenji Fujimitsu, Kei Takase, Shōta Iizuka	38.23	Q, SB
6	3	9	Canada	Gavin Smellie, Aaron Brown, Dontae Richards-Kwok, Justyn Warner	38.29	Q, SB
7	1	7	Trinidad and Tobago	Jamol James, Keston Bledman, Rondel Sorrillo, Richard Thompson	38.38	q, SB
8	3	2	Netherlands	Brian Mariano, Churandy Martina, Liemarvin Bonevacia, Hensley Paulina	38.41	q, SB
9	1	6	Spain	Eduard Viles, Sergio Ruiz, Bruno Hortelano, Ángel David Rodríguez	38.46	NR
10	3	5	Italy	Michael Tumi, Matteo Galvan, Diego Marani, Delmas Obou	38.49	SB
11	1	9	Poland	Robert Kubaczyk, Grzegorz Zimniewicz, Karol Zalewski, Kamil Kryński	38.51	SB
12	2	3	Ukraine	Ruslan Perestyuk, Serhiy Smelyk, Ihor Bodrov, Vitaliy Korzh	38.57	
13	3	8	Saint Kitts and Nevis	Lestrod Roland, Jason Rogers, Antoine Adams, Allistar Clarke	38.58	SB
14	3	4	Bahamas	Adrian Griffith, Warren Fraser, Jamial Rolle, Shavez Hart	38.70	NR
15	2	8	Barbados	Andrew Hinds, Levi Cadogan, Shane Brathwaite, Ramon Gittens	38.94	NR
16	2	7	China	Guo Fan, Liang Jiahong, Su Bingtian, Zhang Peimeng	38.95	SB
17	2	6	France	Emmanuel Biron, Mickaël-Meba Zézé, Arnaud Rémy, Jimmy Vicaut	38.97	
18	1	8	South Korea	Oh Kyong-Soo, Cho Kyu-Won, Yoo Min-Woo, Kim Kuk-Young	39.00	NR
19	1	4	Russia	Aleksandr Khyutte, Konstantin Petryashov, Roman Smirnov, Aleksandr Brednev	39.01	SB
20	2	5	Hong Kong	Tang Yik Chun, Lai Chun Ho, Ng Ka Fung, Tsui Chi Ho	39.10	
21	1	5	Venezuela	Jermaine Chirinos, Diego Rivas, Álvaro Luis Cassiani, Alberth Bravo	39.14	SB
22	3	6	Chinese Taipei	Wang Wen-tang, Liu Yuan-kai, Pan Po-yu, Lo Yen-yao	39.72	
	3	3	Australia	Tim Leathart, Josh Ross, Andrew McCabe, Jarrod Geddes	DNF	

=== Final ===
The final was started at 18:40.

Rank	Lane	Nation	Athletes	Time	Notes
1st place, gold medalist(s)	5	Jamaica	Nesta Carter, Kemar Bailey-Cole, Nickel Ashmeade, Usain Bolt	37.36	WL
2nd place, silver medalist(s)	4	United States	Charles Silmon, Mike Rodgers, Mookie Salaam, Justin Gatlin	37.66	
3rd place, bronze medalist(s)	7	Canada	Gavin Smellie, Aaron Brown, Dontae Richards-Kwok, Justyn Warner	37.92	SB
4	3	Germany	Lucas Jakubczyk, Sven Knipphals, Julian Reus, Martin Keller	38.04	SB
5	2	Netherlands	Brian Mariano, Churandy Martina, Liemarvin Bonevacia, Hensley Paulina	38.37	SB
6	8	Japan	Yoshihide Kiryu, Kenji Fujimitsu, Kei Takase, Shōta Iizuka	38.39	
7	1	Trinidad and Tobago	Ayodele Taffe, Keston Bledman, Rondel Sorrillo, Richard Thompson	38.57	
	6	Great Britain & N.I.	Adam Gemili, Harry Aikines-Aryeetey, James Ellington, Dwain Chambers	DQ (37.80)	170.7
