= Kenya at the 2013 World Championships in Athletics =

- WA code: KEN

in Moscow
- Competitors: 49
- Medals: Gold 5 Silver 4 Bronze 3 Total 12

World Championships in Athletics appearances (overview)
- 1983; 1987; 1991; 1993; 1995; 1997; 1999; 2001; 2003; 2005; 2007; 2009; 2011; 2013; 2015; 2017; 2019; 2022; 2023

Kenya competed at the 2013 World Championships in Athletics from August 10 to August 18 in Moscow, Russia.

== Medalists ==
The following competitors from Kenya won medals at the Championships

Medal	Athlete	Event
Gold	Edna Kiplagat	Marathon
Gold	Milcah Chemos Cheywa	3,000 metres steeplechase
Gold	Ezekiel Kemboi	3,000 metres steeplechase
Gold	Asbel Kiprop	1,500 metres
Gold	Eunice Sum	800 metres
Silver	Lydia Chepkurui	3,000 metres steeplechase
Silver	Gladys Cherono	10,000 metres
Silver	Conseslus Kipruto	3,000 metres steeplechase
Silver	Mercy Cherono	5,000 metres
Bronze	Paul Tanui	10,000 metres
Bronze	Hellen Onsando Obiri	1,500 metres
Bronze	Isiah Koech	5,000 metres

== Team selection ==
Kenya sends a team consisting of 49 athletes to Moscow. Notably missing from the squad is defending 800 metres champion and world record holder David Rudisha.

Athlete	Event	Preliminaries		Heats		Semifinals		Final	
Athlete	Event	Time Width Height	Rank	Time Width Height	Rank	Time Width Height	Rank	Time Width Height	Rank
Anthony Chemut	800 metres			1:47.13	22 Q	1:46.06	15	did not advance	
Ferguson Rotich	800 metres			1:45.25	2 Q	Disqualified		did not advance	
Jeremia Mutai	800 metres			1:50.17	40	did not advance			
Bethwell Birgen	1500 metres			3:38.60	7 Q	3:37.34	10	did not advance	
Silas Kiplagat	1500 metres			3:39.31	18 Q	3:43.52	13 Q	3:37.11	6
Asbel Kiprop	1500 metres			3:38.15	1 Q	3:43.30	12 Q	3:36.28	1st place, gold medalist(s)
Nixon Chepseba	1500 metres			3:38.37	2 Q	3:35.88	1 Q	3:36.87	4
Isaiah Kiplangat Koech	5000 metres			13:22.19	3 Q			13:27.26	3rd place, bronze medalist(s)
Thomas Longosiwa	5000 metres			13:23.94	9 Q			13:27.67	4
Edwin Soi	5000 metres			13:21.44	2 Q			13:29.01	5
John Kipkoech	5000 metres			13:31.21	17			did not advance	
Bedan Karoki	10,000 metres							27:27.17	6
Paul Tanui	10,000 metres							27.22.61	3rd place, bronze medalist(s)
Kenneth Kipkemoi	10,000 metres							27:28.50	7
Bernard Koech	Marathon							did not finish	
Michael Kipyego	Marathon							2:17:47	25
Bernard Kipyego	Marathon							2:14:01	12
Peter Some	Marathon							2:11:47	9
Nicholas Kipkemboi	Marathon							did not finish	
Conseslus Kipruto	3000 metres steeplechase			8:22.31	7 Q			8:06.37	2nd place, silver medalist(s)
Abel Mutai	3000 metres steeplechase			8:19.15	3 Q			8:17.04	7
Ezekiel Kemboi	3000 metres steeplechase			8:23.84	11 Q			8:06.01	1st place, gold medalist(s)
Paul Kipsiele Koech	3000 metres steeplechase			8:22.88	8 Q			8:08.62	4
Alphas Leken Kishoyian; Moses Kertich; Boniface Mweresa; Mike Mokamba Nyang'Au; Boniface Mucheru; Vincent Kosgei	4 x 400 metres relay			3:06.29 SB	23			did not advance	
Julius Yego	Javelin throw	80.88	8 q					85.40 NR	4

=== Women ===
Athlete	Event	Preliminaries		Heats		Semifinals		Final	
Athlete	Event	Time Width Height	Rank	Time Width Height	Rank	Time Width Height	Rank	Time Width Height	Rank
Maureen Jelagat	400 metres			Disqualified		did not advance			
Eunice Sum	800 metres			2:00.49	14 Q	2:00.70	7 Q	1:57.38 PB	1st place, gold medalist(s)
Winnie Chebet	800 metres			1:59.58 SB	5 q	2:01.04	12	did not advance	
Hellen Obiri	1500 metres			4:06.98	2 Q	4:05.76	10 Q	4:03.86	3rd place, bronze medalist(s)
Faith Chepngetich	1500 metres			4:08.66	19 Q	4:04.83	2 Q	4:05.08	5
Nancy Jebet Langat	1500 metres			4:07.98	10 Q	4:05.30	6 q	4:06.01	9
Mercy Cherono	5000 metres			15:34.70	8 Q			14:51.22	2nd place, silver medalist(s)
Viola Kibiwott	5000 metres			15:24.47	3 Q			15:01.67	4
Margaret Wangare	5000 metres			did not finish				did not advance	
Gladys Cherono	10,000 metres							30:45.17	2nd place, silver medalist(s)
Emily Chebet	10,000 metres							30:47.02	4
Sally Kaptich Chepyego	10,000 metres							31:22.11	7
Edna Kiplagat	Marathon							2:25:44	1st place, gold medalist(s)
Lucy Kabuu	Marathon							2:44:06	24
Valentine Kipketer	Marathon							did not finish	
Milcah Chemos Cheywa	3000 metres steeplechase			9:36.16	8 Q			9:11.65 WL	1st place, gold medalist(s)
Gladys Kipkemoi	3000 metres steeplechase			9:54.22	24			did not advance	
Hyvin Kiyeng	3000 metres steeplechase			9:36.19 SB	9 Q			9:22.05 PB	6
Lydia Chepkurui	3000 metres steeplechase			9:24.19	2 Q			9:12.55 PB	2nd place, silver medalist(s)
