= 2013 World Championships in Athletics – Men's 20 kilometres walk =

Men's 20 kilometres walk at the 2013 World Championships
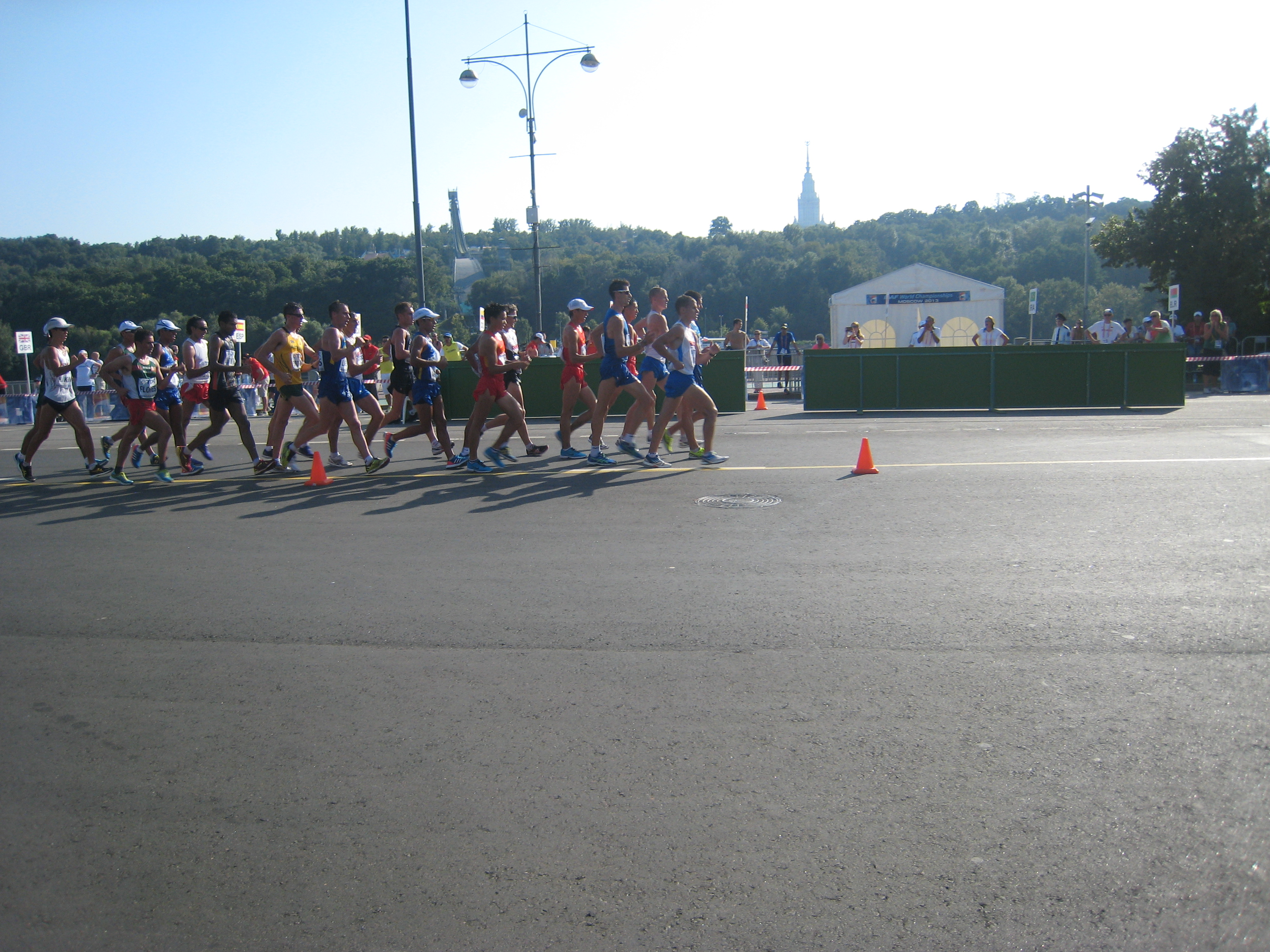
- Venue: Luzhniki Stadium
- Dates: 11 August (final)
- Competitors: 64 from 34 nations
- Winning time: 1:20:58

Medalists
gold medal	Chen Ding; China
silver medal	Miguel Ángel López; Spain
bronze medal	João Vieira; Portugal

The men's 20 kilometres walk at the 2013 World Championships in Athletics was held at the Luzhniki Stadium and Moscow streets on 11 August.

The first leader was Takumi Saito who set the pace for the first 5K, opening up a gap on the pack, with his Japanese teammate Yusuke Suzuki the first to chase him down. Suzuki moved out to a 13-second lead by the 10K mark. The six chasers included all three 2012 Olympic medalists. The first to catch him was bronze medalist Wang Zhen who pulled out to the lead only to get disqualified. Even though he had received the notification, Wang continued until he was taken off the course. Behind him, Olympic gold medalist Chen Ding, Erick Barrondo silver medalist and local favorite Aleksandr Ivanov took up the front, 22 seconds ahead of the next group. But Barrondo picked up two red cards.

After 15K, Ivanov took off, with Barrondo giving chase. First Ivanov picked up a red card and slowed down. Then Barrondo picked up his third red card and was told to leave the race to his disbelief. When Chen passed him, he raised his arm to wave good bye. But Chen couldn't catch Ivanov, who took a ten-second victory in front of cheering Russian fans.

One walker gave a positive test at the competition: second last finisher Ebrahim Rahimian of Iran had used erythropoietin.

== Records ==
Prior to the competition, the records were as follows:

World record	Vladimir Kanaykin (RUS)	1:17:16	Saransk, Russia	29 September 2007
Championship record	Jefferson Pérez (ECU)	1:17:21	Saint-Denis, France	23 August 2003
World Leading	Petr Trofimov (RUS)	1:18:28	Sochi, Russia	23 February 2013
African Record	Hatem Ghoula (TUN)	1:19:02	Eisenhüttenstadt, Germany	10 May 1997
Asian Record	Wang Zhen (CHN)	1:17:36	Taicang, China	30 March 2012
North, Central American and Caribbean record	Julio René Martínez (GUA)	1:17:46	Eisenhüttenstadt, Germany	8 May 1999
South American Record	Jefferson Pérez (ECU)	1:17:21	Saint-Denis, France	23 August 2003
European Record	Vladimir Kanaykin (RUS)	1:17:16	Saransk, Russia	29 September 2007
Oceanian record	Nathan Deakes (AUS)	1:17:33	Cixi, China	23 April 2005

== Qualification standards ==
A standard	B standard
1:24:00	1:26:00

== Schedule ==
Date	Time	Round
11 August 2013	17:00	Final

== Results ==
KEY:	NR	National record	PB	Personal best	SB	Seasonal best

=== Final ===
The race was started at 17:00.

Rank	Name	Nationality	Time	Notes
DQ	Aleksandr Ivanov	Russia	~~1:20:58~~	Doping
1st place, gold medalist(s)	Chen Ding	China	1:21:09	SB
2nd place, silver medalist(s)	Miguel Ángel López	Spain	1:21:21	SB
3rd place, bronze medalist(s)	João Vieira	Portugal	1:22:05	
4	Denis Strelkov	Russia	1:22:06	
5	Takumi Saito	Japan	1:22:09	
6	Ruslan Dmytrenko	Ukraine	1:22:14	
7	Inaki Gomez	Canada	1:22:21	SB
8	Christopher Linke	Germany	1:22:36	SB
9	Kim Hyun-sub	South Korea	1:22:50	SB
10	Dane Bird-Smith	Australia	1:23:06	
11	Yusuke Suzuki	Japan	1:23:20	
12	Jaime Quiyuch	Guatemala	1:23:24	
13	Matteo Giupponi	Italy	1:23:27	SB
14	Matteo Giupponi	Italy	1:23:27	SB
15	Andrii Kovenko	Ukraine	1:23:46	
16	Alexandros Papamihail	Greece	1:23:48	SB
17	José Leonardo Montaña	Colombia	1:23:50	SB
18	Rolando Saquipay	Ecuador	1:24:01	SB
19	Rafał Augustyn	Poland	1:24:03	
20	Benjamin Thorne	Canada	1:24:26	
21	Anton Kučmín	Slovakia	1:24:38	
22	Yerko Araya	Chile	1:24:42	SB
23	Ato Ibáñez	Sweden	1:24:49	
24	Álvaro Martín	Spain	1:25:12	
25	Marius Žiūkas	Lithuania	1:25:17	
26	Cai Zelin	China	1:25:31	
27	Hatem Ghoula	Tunisia	1:25:41	
28	Giorgio Rubino	Italy	1:25:42	
29	Bertrand Moulinet	France	1:26:12	SB
30	Ivan Losyev	Ukraine	1:26:32	
31	Alex Wright	Great Britain & N.I.	1:26:40	
32	Diego Flores	Mexico	1:26:46	
33	Gurmeet Singh	India	1:26:47	
34	Chandan Singh	India	1:26:51	
35	Mauricio Arteaga	Ecuador	1:27:35	
36	Georgiy Sheiko	Kazakhstan	1:27:41	
37	Isaac Palma	Mexico	1:28:14	
38	Perseus Karlstrom	Sweden	1:28:20	SB
39	Choe Byeong Kwang	South Korea	1:28:26	
40	Sérgio Vieira	Portugal	1:28:34	
41	Máté Helebrandt	Hungary	1:28:49	
42	Arnis Rumbenieks	Latvia	1:29:13	
43	Federico Tontodonati	Italy	1:29:26	
44	Francisco Arcilla	Spain	1:29:38	
45	Vitaliy Anichkin	Kazakhstan	1:30:02	
46	Juan Manuel Cano	Argentina	1:30:45	SB
47	Anibal Paau	Guatemala	1:30:54	
48	Dzianis Simanovich	Belarus	1:31:52	
49	Andrey Ruzavin	Russia	1:32:45	
50	Rhydian Cowley	Australia	1:33:35	
51	Alejandro Francisco Florez	Switzerland	1:35:01	
DQ	Ebrahim Rahimian	Iran	~~1:35:46~~	Doping
52	Tim Seaman	United States	1:36:35	
	Irfan Kolothum Thodi	India	DQ	
	Érick Barrondo	Guatemala	DQ	
	Wang Zhen	China	DQ	
	Byun Young-Jun	South Korea	DQ	
	Caio Bonfim	Brazil	DQ	
	Lebogang Shange	South Africa	DNF	
	Dawid Tomala	Poland	DNF	
	Éider Arévalo	Colombia	DNF	
	Luis Fernando López	Colombia	DNF	
	Kevin Campion	France	DNF	
	Hassanine Sebei	Tunisia	DNF	
