= Australia at the 2013 World Championships in Athletics =

Australia's competition record at the 2013 World Championships

- WA code: AUS

in Moscow
- Competitors: 47
- Medals: Gold 0 Silver 3 Bronze 0 Total 3

World Championships in Athletics appearances (overview)
- 1976; 1980; 1983; 1987; 1991; 1993; 1995; 1997; 1999; 2001; 2003; 2005; 2007; 2009; 2011; 2013; 2015; 2017; 2019; 2022; 2023; 2025

Australia competed at the 2013 World Championships in Athletics in Moscow, Russia, from 10–18 August 2013. A team of 47 athletes was announced to represent the country in the event.

== Medallists ==
The following Australian competitors won medals at the Championships

Medal	Name	Event	Date
2nd place, silver medalist(s)	Sally Pearson	Women's 100 metres hurdles	17 August
2nd place, silver medalist(s)	Kimberley Mickle	Women's javelin throw	18 August
2nd place, silver medalist(s)	Jared Tallent	Men's 50 kilometres walk	14 August

== Results ==
(q – qualified, NM – no mark, SB – season best)

=== Men ===
Track and road events

Athlete	Event	Preliminaries		Heats		Semifinals		Final	
Athlete	Event	Time	Rank	Time	Rank	Time	Rank	Time	Rank
Joshua Ross	200 metres			21.45	45	Did not advance			
Alexander Rowe	800 metres			1:45.96	6 q	1:45.80	13	Did not advance	
Brett Robinson	5000 metres			13:25.38	13 q			14:03.77	15
Ben St.Lawrence	5000 metres			13:33.64	18			Did not advance	
Collis Birmingham	10,000 metres							28:44.82	24
Ben St.Lawrence	10,000 metres							DNS	
Tristan Thomas	400 metres hurdles			49.80	17 q	49.91	18	Did not advance	
Jarrod Geddes; Nicholas Hough; Tim Leathart; Andrew McCabe; Isaac Ntiamoah; Joshua Ross	4 × 100 metres relay			DNF				Did not advance	
Alexander Beck; Craig Burns; Ben Offereins; Josh Ralph; Steven Solomon; Tristan Thomas	4 × 400 metres relay			3:02.28 SB	11 Q			3:02.26 SB	8
Martin Dent	Marathon							2:17:11 SB	23
Shawn Forrest	Marathon							2:44:31 SB	50
Dane Bird-Smith	20 kilometres walk							1:23:06	11
Rhydian Cowley	20 kilometres walk							1:33:35	50
Chris Erickson	50 kilometres walk							3:49:41 PB	16
Ian Rayson	50 kilometres walk							DSQ	
Jared Tallent	50 kilometres walk							3:40:03 SB	2nd place, silver medalist(s)

Field events

Athlete	Event	Preliminaries		Final	
Athlete	Event	Width Height	Rank	Width Height	Rank
Fabrice Lapierre	Long jump	NM		Did not advance	
Brandon Starc	High jump	2.17	=25	Did not advance	
Benn Harradine	Discus throw	59.68	20	Did not advance	
Julian Wruck	Discus throw	62.48	11 q	62.40	11
Hamish Peacock	Javelin throw	76.33	27	Did not advance	

=== Women ===
Track and road events

Athlete	Event	Preliminaries		Heats		Semifinals		Final	
Athlete	Event	Time	Rank	Time	Rank	Time	Rank	Time	Rank
Melissa Breen	100 metres			11.47	27	Did not advance			
Melissa Breen	200 metres			23.95	39	Did not advance			
Caitlin Sargent	400 metres			52.63	28	Did not advance			
Kelly Hetherington	800 metres			2:01.57	22	Did not advance			
Zoe Buckman	1500 metres			4:06.99	3 Q	4:04.82 PB	1 Q	4:05.77	7
Jackie Areson	5000 metres			15:40.21	10 q				
Lara Tamsett	10,000 metres							DNF	
Sally Pearson	100 metres hurdles			12.62 SB	2 Q	12.50	1 Q	12.50 SB	2nd place, silver medalist(s)
Lauren Boden	400 metres hurdles			55.37	7 q	55.75	14	Did not advance	
Nicole Chapple	Marathon							3:05:49	45
Jane Fardell	Marathon							DNF	
Lauren Shelley	Marathon							2:55:40 SB	40
Jessica Trengove	Marathon							2:37:11 SB	11
Tanya Holliday	20 kilometres walk							1:35:18	45
Jess Rothwell	20 kilometres walk							1:38:03	54

Field events

Athlete	Event	Preliminaries		Final	
Athlete	Event	Width Height	Rank	Width Height	Rank
Dani Samuels	Discus throw	62.85	7 q	62.42	10
Kimberley Mickle	Javelin throw	65.73 PB	2 Q	66.60 PB	2nd place, silver medalist(s)
Kathryn Mitchell	Javelin throw	62.80 SB	5 Q	63.77 SB	5

== See also ==
Australia at other World Championships in 2013

- Australia at the 2013 UCI Road World Championships
- Australia at the 2013 World Aquatics Championships
