= 2013 World Championships in Athletics – Women's marathon =

Women's marathon at the 2013 World Championships
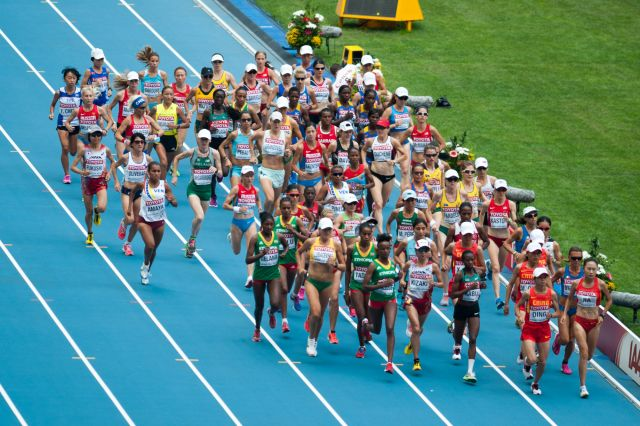
- Start of the women marathon
- Venue: Luzhniki Stadium
- Dates: 10 August (final)
- Competitors: 70 from 34 nations
- Winning time: 2:25:44

Medalists
gold medal	Edna Kiplagat; Kenya
silver medal	Valeria Straneo; Italy
bronze medal	Kayoko Fukushi; Japan

Official Video

The women's marathon at the 2013 World Championships in Athletics was held at the Luzhniki Stadium and Moscow streets on 10 August.

The first event of these World Championships started under hot and humid conditions at 2 in the afternoon. The race was dominated by the front running of 37-year-old Italian Valeria Straneo, leading at every split point. Like the 2012 Olympics, this did not look like the day for defending champion Edna Kiplagat, by 10K she had already dropped almost 30 seconds off the pace set by a large pack of leaders. By 15K, Kiplagat had joined the pack of 7 leaders, which also included Jia Chaofeng, Lucy Wangui Kabuu, Valentine Jepkorir Kipketer, Meselech Melkamu, Feyse Tadese and Kayoko Fukushi with the rest of the field being single or double marathoners, without any chase group. The pack lost individuals, Jia was the first to exit, followed by Tadese, Kipketer and Kabuu. By the time Fukushi lost some ground, the closest remaining chaser was her teammate Ryoko Kizaki over a minute back. When Melkamu left, she left quickly leaving a two-woman race to the finish. In the shadow of the stadium, Kiplagat pulled away from Straneo through the Olympic Park to a 14-second victory, Fukushi about 2 minutes back to get the bronze. Kiplagat is the first woman to repeat as champion in the marathon.

== Records ==
Prior to the competition, the records were as follows:

World record	Paula Radcliffe (GBR)	2:15:25	London, United Kingdom	13 April 2003
Championship record	Paula Radcliffe (GBR)	2:20:57	Helsinki, Finland	14 August 2005
World leading	Priscah Jeptoo (KEN)	2:20:15	London, United Kingdom	21 April 2013
African record	Mary Jepkosgei Keitany (KEN)	2:18:37	London, United Kingdom	22 April 2012
Asian record	Mizuki Noguchi (JPN)	2:19:12	Berlin, Germany	25 September 2005
NACAC record	Deena Kastor (USA)	2:19:36	London, United Kingdom	23 April 2006
South American record	Inés Melchor (PER)	2:28:54	London, United Kingdom	5 August 2012
European record	Paula Radcliffe (GBR)	2:15:25	London, United Kingdom	13 April 2003
Oceanian record	Benita Willis (AUS)	2:22:36	Chicago, United States	22 October 2006

== Qualification standards ==
Time
2:43:00

== Schedule ==
Date	Time	Round
10 August 2013	14:00	Final

== Results ==
KEY:	NR	National record	PB	Personal best	SB	Seasonal best

=== Final ===
The race was started at 14:00.

Rank	Name	Nationality	Time	Notes
1st place, gold medalist(s)	Edna Kiplagat	Kenya	2:25:44	
2nd place, silver medalist(s)	Valeria Straneo	Italy	2:25:58	SB
3rd place, bronze medalist(s)	Kayoko Fukushi	Japan	2:27:45	
4	Ryoko Kizaki	Japan	2:31:28	
5	Alessandra Aguilar	Spain	2:32:38	
6	Emma Quaglia	Italy	2:34:16	SB
7	Madaí Pérez	Mexico	2:34:23	SB
8	Kim Hye-Gyong	North Korea	2:35:49	
9	Deena Kastor	United States	2:36:12	SB
10	Susan Partridge	Great Britain & N.I.	2:36:24	
11	Jessica Trengove	Australia	2:37:11	SB
12	Diana Lobačevskė	Lithuania	2:37:48	
13	Aberu Kebede	Ethiopia	2:38:04	
14	Kim Hye-Song	North Korea	2:38:28	
15	Lishan Dula	Bahrain	2:38:47	SB
16	Sonia Samuels	Great Britain & N.I.	2:38:47	SB
17	Sin Yong-Sun	North Korea	2:39:22	
18	Dorothy McMahan	United States	2:39:52	SB
19	Ding Changqin	China	2:40:13	
20	Živilė Balčiūnaitė	Lithuania	2:41:09	SB
21	Albina Mayorova	Russia	2:41:19	
22	Nadezhda Leonteva	Russia	2:42:49	
23	Jeannette Faber	United States	2:44:03	SB
24	Lucy Wangui Kabuu	Kenya	2:44:06	SB
25	Alina Armas	Namibia	2:45:09	
26	Alevtina Biktimirova	Russia	2:45:11	
27	Tatyana Aryasova	Russia	2:45:27	
28	Wei Xiaojie	China	2:46:46	
29	Kalliopi Astropekaki	Greece	2:47:12	
30	Remalda Kergytė	Lithuania	2:47:30	
31	Kateryna Karmanenko	Ukraine	2:48:18	SB
32	Kim Seong-Eun	South Korea	2:48:46	
33	Carmen Oliveras	France	2:48:58	
34	Cao Mojie	China	2:49:15	
35	Renate Wyss	Switzerland	2:50:41	
36	Karina Córdoba	Argentina	2:51:07	SB
37	Mary Davies	New Zealand	2:51:24	
38	Iuliia Andreeva	Kyrgyzstan	2:53:16	
39	Erika Abril	Colombia	2:55:13	
40	Lauren Shelley	Australia	2:55:40	SB
41	Karina Neipán	Argentina	2:56:02	SB
42	Tanith Maxwell	South Africa	2:56:37	SB
43	Zuleima Amaya	Venezuela	2:58:22	
44	Lanni Marchant	Canada	3:01:54	SB
45	Nicole Chapple	Australia	3:05:49	
46	Daneja Grandovec	Slovenia	3:10:46	SB
	Nebiat Habtemariam	Eritrea	DQ	
	Érika Olivera	Chile	DNF	
	Chen Yu-Hsuan	Chinese Taipei	DNF	
	He Yinli	China	DNF	
	Jia Chaofeng	China	DNF	
	Jane Fardell	Australia	DNF	
	Yolymar Pineda	Venezuela	DNF	
	Valentine Jepkorir Kipketer	Kenya	DNF	
	María Peralta	Argentina	DNF	
	Leena Ekandjo	Namibia	DNF	
	Feyse Tadese	Ethiopia	DNF	
	Kim Mi-Gyong	North Korea	DNF	
	Meselech Melkamu	Ethiopia	DNF	
	Tiki Gelana	Ethiopia	DNF	
	Mizuki Noguchi	Japan	DNF	
	Meseret Hailu	Ethiopia	DNF	
	Luvsanlkhündegiin Otgonbayar	Mongolia	DNF	
	Sultan Haydar	Turkey	DNF	
	Ümmü Kiraz	Turkey	DNF	
	Helalia Johannes	Namibia	DNF	
	Slađana Perunović	Montenegro	DNF	
	Krista DuChene	Canada	DNF	
	Beata Naigambo	Namibia	DNF	
	Maria McCambridge	Ireland	DNF	
	Patricia Morceli Bühler	Switzerland	DNS	
	Rosa Chacha	Ecuador	DNS	
