= Bernard Kiprop =

Bernard Kiprop may refer to:

- Bernard Kiprop Koech (born 1988), Kenyan marathon runner
- Bernard Kiprop Kipyego (born 1986) Kenyan marathon runner
