= 2013 World Championships in Athletics – Men's 5000 metres =

Men's 5000 metres at the 2013 World Championships
- Venue: Luzhniki Stadium
- Dates: 13 August (heats); 16 August (final)
- Competitors: 29 from 18 nations
- Winning time: 13:26.98

Medalists
gold medal	Mo Farah; Great Britain & N.I.
silver medal	Hagos Gebrhiwet; Ethiopia
bronze medal	Isiah Koech; Kenya

Official Video

The men's 5000 metres at the 2013 World Championships in Athletics was held at the Luzhniki Stadium on 13 and 16 August.

Fifteen qualified for the final. Of the ten automatic qualifiers, three each were from Kenya, Ethiopia and the United States. But all eyes were on the one from England, the defending champion, Olympic champion and 10000 winner from these championships all rolled up into one Mo Farah.

The first lap of the final started off at a jog for these world class competitors. On the second lap, the Kenyans as a group pushed the pace, but it didn't last long and the pack reformed. At such a leisurely pace, nobody was at risk of getting dropped. Instead confusion. Hagos Gebrhiwet literally a step behind Farah near the back of the pack, watching his every step. At 2000 meters, Farah decided to take a chance at the lead, but it was not to advance the pace but to slow it down. With Farah at the front the pace slowed to 68 seconds, then almost 70 seconds and the rest of the field obediently crowded up behind him, not willing to go out alone against the king. With 5 laps to go, Isiah Koech decided to make the break and took off. The race accelerated to 62-second laps with all the players covering each other's move and jockeying for position. For a lap Yenew Alamirew held the lead, accelerating as anyone looked to try to pass. With 650 to go, Farah made his move, successfully passing Alamirew he only gained a step on the field but that was enough, now he wouldn't let anybody pass him, the field stinging out behind him, the suitors dwindling. Through the final lap in 53 seconds, Koech made repeated attempts to get past Farah but each time Farah was able to go that much faster. Two steps behind at the beginning of the straight, Gebrhiwet weaved his way around the other two Kenyans and came flying down the outside as Koech let up in defeat, Gebrhiwet taking silver by one thousandth of a second after 5000 meters.

== Records ==
Prior to the competition, the records were as follows:

World record	Kenenisa Bekele (ETH)	12:37.35	Hengelo, Netherlands	31 May 2004
Championship record	Eliud Kipchoge (KEN)	12:52.79	Saint-Denis, France	31 August 2003
World Leading	Edwin Cheruiyot Soi (KEN)	12:51.34	Monaco	19 July 2013
African Record	Kenenisa Bekele (ETH)	12:37.35	Hengelo, Netherlands	31 May 2004
Asian Record	Saif Saaeed Shaheen (QAT)	12:51.98	Rome, Italy	14 July 2006
North, Central American and Caribbean record	Bernard Lagat (USA)	12:53.60	Monaco	22 July 2011
South American Record	Marilson dos Santos (BRA)	13:19.43	Kassel, Germany	8 June 2006
European Record	Mohammed Mourhit (BEL)	12:49.71	Brussels, Belgium	25 August 2000
Oceanian record	Craig Mottram (AUS)	12:55.76	London, Great Britain	30 July 2004

== Qualification standards ==
A time	B time
13:15.00	13:20.00

== Schedule ==
Date	Time	Round
13 August 2013	10:20	Heats
16 August 2013	20:45	Final

All times are local times (UTC+4)

== Results ==
KEY:	q	Fastest non-qualifiers	Q	Qualified	NR	National record	PB	Personal best	SB	Seasonal best

=== Heats ===
Qualification: First 5 in each heat (Q) and the next 5 fastest (q) advanced to the final.

Rank	Heat	Name	Nationality	Time	Notes
1	2	Muktar Edris	Ethiopia	13:20.82	Q
2	2	Edwin Soi	Kenya	13:21.44	Q
3	2	Isaiah Koech	Kenya	13:22.19	Q
4	1	Hagos Gebrhiwet	Ethiopia	13:23.22	Q
5	1	Yenew Alamirew	Ethiopia	13:23.48	Q
6	1	Bernard Lagat	United States	13:23.59	Q
7	2	Galen Rupp	United States	13:23.91	Q
8	2	Mo Farah	Great Britain & N.I.	13:23.93	Q
9	1	Thomas Longosiwa	Kenya	13:23.94	Q
10	1	Ryan Hill	United States	13:24.19	Q
11	1	Elroy Gelant	South Africa	13:25.07	q
12	2	Dejenee Regassa	Bahrain	13:25.21	q
13	1	Brett Robinson	Australia	13:25.38	q
14	1	Sindre Buraas	Norway	13:26.69	q
15	1	Zane Robertson	New Zealand	13:27.89	q
16	2	Othmane El Goumri	Morocco	13:31.08	
17	1	John Kipkoech	Kenya	13:31.21	
18	2	Ben St Lawrence	Australia	13:33.64	
19	1	Phillip Kipyeko	Uganda	13:33.68	
20	1	Arne Gabius	Germany	13:34.26	
21	2	Alemayehu Bezabeh	Spain	13:34.68	
22	2	Byron Piedra	Ecuador	13:35.38	
23	2	Yuki Sato	Japan	13:37.07	
24	1	Aziz Lahbabi	Morocco	13:37.75	
25	2	Diego Estrada	Mexico	13:48.38	
26	1	Sergio Sánchez	Spain	13:52.05	
27	2	Rinas Akhmadeev	Russia	13:58.38	
28	2	Jake Robertson	New Zealand	14:09.50	
29	1	Grevazio Mpani	Malawi	14:15.65	
	1	Abdoulaye Abdelkarim	Chad	DNS	
	2	Moses Ndiema Kipsiro	Uganda	DNS	

=== Final ===
The final was started at 20:45.

Rank	Name	Nationality	Time	Notes
1st place, gold medalist(s)	Mo Farah	Great Britain & N.I.	13:26.98	
2nd place, silver medalist(s)	Hagos Gebrhiwet	Ethiopia	13:27.26	
3rd place, bronze medalist(s)	Isiah Koech	Kenya	13:27.26	
4	Thomas Longosiwa	Kenya	13:27.67	
5	Edwin Soi	Kenya	13:29.01	
6	Bernard Lagat	United States	13:29.24	
7	Muktar Edris	Ethiopia	13:29.56	
8	Galen Rupp	United States	13:29.87	
9	Yenew Alamirew	Ethiopia	13:31.27	
10	Ryan Hill	United States	13:32.69	
11	Dejenee Regassa	Bahrain	13:34.54	
12	Elroy Gelant	South Africa	13:43.68	
13	Sindre Buraas	Norway	13:45.67	
14	Zane Robertson	New Zealand	13:46.55	
15	Brett Robinson	Australia	14:03.77	
