= 2013 World Championships in Athletics – Men's marathon =

Men's marathon at the 2013 World Championships
- Venue: Luzhniki Stadium
- Dates: 17 August (final)
- Competitors: 69 from 39 nations
- Winning time: 2:09:51

Medalists
gold medal	Stephen Kiprotich; Uganda
silver medal	Lelisa Desisa; Ethiopia
bronze medal	Tadese Tola; Ethiopia

Official Video

The men's marathon at the 2013 World Championships in Athletics was held at the Luzhniki Stadium and Moscow streets on 17 August.

Coming through the half marathon in 1:05:10, the lead pack stayed formed until around the 30K mark with still about 13 with that group. Over the next 5K, contenders began to fall off the pace, first a pack of six were left, with two Ugandans; reigning Olympic champion Stephen Kiprotich and Jackson Kiprop, with three Ethiopians; Lelisa Desisa, Tadese Tola and Tsegaye Kebede and Peter Kimeli Some the lone Kenyan. Kiprop fell back but Kentaro Nakamoto fought his way back to the pack as Kiprotich began experimenting with surges. Some and then Nakamoto started to fall behind. Kebede was next to go, followed by Tola, but Desisa stuck to Kiprotich like glue. Kiprotich crossed the roadway from side to side, more like match race sailboat tacking maneuvers and Delisa followed. Finally in the last kilometer, Kiprotich was able to make a gap. A meter became ten then fifty. A jubilant Kiprotich began throwing kisses to the crowd, crossing the finish line more than a hundred meters ahead of Delisa. Tola held on for third, with Kebede barely ahead of Nakamoto. Solonei da Silva and Paulo Roberto Paula came in together, so with four Ethiopians, two Ugandans and two Brazilians, three countries put at least a pair of runners into the top ten, while Kenya only managed one; Some in ninth.

The original 33rd placer, Jeremías Saloj of Guatemala, was disqualified after testing positive for erythropoietin (EPO).

== Records ==
Prior to the competition, the records were as follows:

World record	Patrick Makau Musyoki (KEN)	2:03:38	Berlin, Germany	25 September 2011
Championship record	Abel Kirui (KEN)	2:06:54	Berlin, Germany	22 August 2009
World Leading	Lelisa Desisa (ETH)	2:04:45	Dubai, United Arab Emirates	25 January 2013
African Record	Patrick Makau Musyoki (KEN)	2:03:38	Berlin, Germany	25 September 2011
Asian Record	Toshinari Takaoka (JPN)	2:06:26	Chicago, United States	13 October 2002
North, Central American and Caribbean record	Khalid Khannouchi (USA)	2:05:38	London, Great Britain	14 April 2002
South American Record	Ronaldo da Costa (BRA)	2:06:05	Berlin, Germany	20 September 1998
European Record	Benoit Zwierzchiewski (FRA)	2:06:36	Paris, France	6 April 2003
Oceanian record	Robert de Castella (AUS)	2:07:51	Boston, MA, United States	21 April 1986

== Qualification standards ==
Time
2:17:00

== Schedule ==
Date	Time	Round
17 August 2013	15:30	Final

All times are local times (UTC+4)

== Results ==
KEY:	NR	National record	PB	Personal best	SB	Seasonal best

=== Final ===
The race was started at 13:30.

Rank	Name	Nationality	Time	Notes
1st place, gold medalist(s)	Stephen Kiprotich	Uganda	2:09:51	
2nd place, silver medalist(s)	Lelisa Desisa	Ethiopia	2:10:12	
3rd place, bronze medalist(s)	Tadese Tola	Ethiopia	2:10:23	
4	Tsegaye Kebede	Ethiopia	2:10:47	
5	Kentaro Nakamoto	Japan	2:10:50	
6	Solonei da Silva	Brazil	2:11:40	SB
7	Paulo Roberto Paula	Brazil	2:11:40	SB
8	Yemane Tsegay	Ethiopia	2:11:43	SB
9	Peter Kimeli Some	Kenya	2:11:47	
10	Jackson Kiprop	Uganda	2:12:12	
11	Beraki Beyene	Eritrea	2:13:40	SB
12	Bernard Kipyego	Kenya	2:14:01	
13	Jeff Eggleston	United States	2:14:23	SB
14	Masakazu Fujiwara	Japan	2:14:29	
15	Javier Guerra	Spain	2:14:33	
16	Samuel Tsegay	Eritrea	2:14:41	SB
17	Kazuhiro Maeda	Japan	2:15:25	
18	Yuki Kawauchi	Japan	2:15:35	
19	Abraham Kiplimo	Uganda	2:16:25	
20	Rob Watson	Canada	2:16:28	SB
21	Paul Pollock	Ireland	2:16:42	SB
22	Mustafa Mohamed	Sweden	2:17:09	SB
23	Martin Dent	Australia	2:17:11	SB
24	Aleksey A. Sokolov (Алексей Соколов)	Russia	2:17:12	
25	Michael Kipyego	Kenya	2:17:47	
26	Marius Ionescu	Romania	2:18:31	
27	Daniel Tapia	United States	2:18:32	SB
28	Benjamin Malaty	France	2:19:21	
29	Jordan Chipangama	Zambia	2:19:47	
30	Miguel Ángel Almachi	Ecuador	2:19:48	SB
31	Kiflom Sium	Eritrea	2:20:01	
32	Chang Chia-che	Chinese Taipei	2:20:02	SB
33	Faustine Mussa	Tanzania	2:20:51	
34	Christian Kreienbühl	Switzerland	2:21:17	
35	Bat-Ochiryn Ser-Od	Mongolia	2:21:55	
36	Carlos Trujillo	United States	2:23:13	SB
37	Tilahun Aliyev	Azerbaijan	2:23:32	
38	Mohamed Ikoki Msandeki	Tanzania	2:24:20	SB
39	Zohar Zemiro	Israel	2:25:23	
40	Michael Ott	Switzerland	2:26:02	
41	Vasyl Matviychuk	Ukraine	2:26:21	SB
42	Sibusiso Nzima	South Africa	2:26:32	
43	Sung Ji-Hun	South Korea	2:26:43	
44	Yin Shujin	China	2:27:19	
45	Roman Prodius	Moldova	2:29:08	
46	Hendrick Ramaala	South Africa	2:30:23	
47	Sergiu Ciobanu	Moldova	2:34:17	SB
48	Kim Young-Jin	South Korea	2:35:53	
49	Shawn Forrest	Australia	2:39:09	SB
50	Mihail Krassilov	Kazakhstan	2:44:31	SB
	Nicholas Kipkemboi	Kenya	DNF	
	Bernard Kiprop Koech	Kenya	DNF	
	Jobo Khatoane	Lesotho	DNF	
	Tsepo Ramonene	Lesotho	DNF	
	Mohamed Bilal	Morocco	DNF	
	Hafid Chani	Morocco	DNF	
	Hiroyuki Horibata	Japan	DNF	
	Feyisa Lilesa	Ethiopia	DNF	
	Ayam Lamdassem	Spain	DNF	
	Tayeb Filali	Algeria	DNF	
	Yared Asmerom	Eritrea	DNF	
	Yonas Kifle	Eritrea	DNF	
	José Antonio Uribe	Mexico	DNF	
	Michel Butter	Netherlands	DNF	
	Hermano Ferreira	Portugal	DNF	
	Jean Pierre Mvuyekure	Rwanda	DNF	
	Aadam Ismaeel Khamis	Bahrain	DNF	
	Wissem Hosni	Tunisia	DNF	
	Cephas Pasipamiri	Zimbabwe	DNS	
—N/a	Jeremías Saloj	Guatemala	2:20:40	DQ (33rd)
