= Jeannette Faber =

American long-distance runner

Personal information
- Born: April 28, 1982 (age 44) Lansing, Michigan, U.S.

Sport
- Country: United States
- Sport: Track and field
- Event: Marathon

Achievements and titles
- Personal best: Marathon: 2:32:37

Jeannette Faber (born April 28, 1982) is an American long-distance runner. She competed in the marathon event at the 2013 World Championships in Athletics in Moscow, Russia where she placed 23rd in 2:44:03. Faber qualified for the 2016 Olympic Marathon Trials at 2013 California International Marathon. She has won eight marathons.
