= 2013 World Championships in Athletics – Men's 800 metres =

Men's 800 metres at the 2013 World Championships
- Venue: Luzhniki Stadium
- Dates: 10 August (heats); 11 August (semifinals); 13 August (final)
- Competitors: 47 from 38 nations
- Winning time: 1:43.31

Medalists
gold medal	Mohammed Aman; Ethiopia
silver medal	Nick Symmonds; United States
bronze medal	Ayanleh Souleiman; Djibouti

Official Video

The men's 800 metres at the 2013 World Championships in Athletics was held at the Luzhniki Stadium on 10–13 August.

In the final, Duane Solomon characteristically took out the pace at just about 50 seconds. Uncharacteristically, second place was occupied by his teammate Nick Symmonds, known for his come from behind tactics. On the final lap the two formed a team USA wall to prevent the rest of the field from getting around. Solomon held the lead into the final straight with Symmonds about to pounce. Mohammed Aman was behind Solomon in a box pinned in by Ayanleh Souleiman. Souleiman slowed as Symmonds slingshotted off the back stretch. The door opened and Aman took off in chase of Symmonds, passing him on the outside 20 meters before the finish. Solomon went out too fast and hence slowed in the final 50 meters, and Souleiman was the next fastest to the finish to pick up bronze. Aman's 1:43.31 is a new Russian soil all comers record.

== Records ==
Prior to the competition, the records were as follows:

World record	David Rudisha (KEN)	1:40.91	(United Kingdom) London, Great Britain	9 August 2012
Championship record	Billy Konchellah (KEN)	1:43.06	Rome, Italy	1 September 1987
World Leading	Duane Solomon (USA)	1:43.27	Des Moines, IA, United States	23 June 2013
African Record	David Rudisha (KEN)	1:40.91	(United Kingdom) London, Great Britain	9 August 2012
Asian Record	Yusuf Saad Kamel (BHR)	1:42.79	Monaco	29 July 2008
North, Central American and Caribbean record	Johnny Gray (USA)	1:42.60	Koblenz, West Germany	28 August 1985
South American Record	Joaquim Cruz (BRA)	1:41.77	Cologne, West Germany	26 August 1984
European Record	Wilson Kipketer (DEN)	1:41.11	Cologne, Germany	24 August 1997
Oceanian record	Peter Snell (NZL)	1:44.3	Christchurch, New Zealand	3 February 1962

== Qualification standards ==
A time	B time
1:45.30	1:46.20

== Schedule ==
Date	Time	Round
10 August 2013	11:20	Heats
11 August 2013	19:35	Semifinals
13 August 2013	21:10	Final

== Results ==
KEY:	q	Fastest non-qualifiers	Q	Qualified	NR	National record	PB	Personal best	SB	Seasonal best

=== Heats ===
Qualification: First 3 in each heat (Q) and the next 6 fastest (q) advanced to the semifinals.

Rank	Heat	Lane	Name	Nationality	Time	Notes
1	5	5	Mohammed Aman	Ethiopia	1:44.93	Q
2	5	6	Ferguson Rotich	Kenya	1:45.25	Q
3	5	8	Michael Rimmer	Great Britain & N.I.	1:45.47	Q
4	3	3	Duane Solomon	United States	1:45.80	Q
5	3	1	Abdulaziz Laden Mohammed	Saudi Arabia	1:45.94	Q
6	5	3	Alexander Rowe	Australia	1:45.96	q
7	2	5	Ronald Musagala	Uganda	1:46.12	Q
8	3	2	Andrew Osagie	Great Britain & N.I.	1:46.16	Q
9	2	6	Adam Kszczot	Poland	1:46.26	Q
10	2	3	Brandon Johnson	United States	1:46.32	Q
11	3	8	Luis Alberto Marco	Spain	1:46.40	q
12	3	6	Tamás Kazi	Hungary	1:46.48	q
13	2	8	Kevin López	Spain	1:46.61	q
14	5	2	Antoine Gakeme	Burundi	1:46.70	q, PB
15	5	7	Rafith Rodríguez	Colombia	1:46.76	q
16	2	2	Andy González	Cuba	1:46.80	
17	6	7	Ayanleh Souleiman	Djibouti	1:46.86	Q
18	4	4	Nick Symmonds	United States	1:46.90	Q
19	4	2	Musaeb Abdulrahman Balla	Qatar	1:46.94	Q
20	4	5	Samir Jamma	Morocco	1:46.94	Q
21	4	7	Mark English	Ireland	1:47.08	
22	6	1	Anthony Chemut	Kenya	1:47.13	Q
23	6	2	Amine El Manaoui	Morocco	1:47.15	Q
24	5	1	Amine Belferar	Algeria	1:47.17	
25	6	5	Jan Kubista	Czech Republic	1:47.66	
26	1	3	Pierre-Ambroise Bosse	France	1:47.70	Q
27	6	8	Anis Ananenka	Belarus	1:47.76	
28	1	8	Marcin Lewandowski	Poland	1:47.83	Q
29	4	1	Prince Mumba	Zambia	1:47.85	
30	1	4	Giordano Benedetti	Italy	1:47.90	Q
31	5	4	Jozef Repčík	Slovakia	1:47.93	
32	1	1	Hamada Mohamed	Egypt	1:47.96	
32	4	3	James Eichberger	Mexico	1:47.96	
34	6	6	Anthony Romaniw	Canada	1:47.98	
35	1	5	Kléberson Davide	Brazil	1:48.28	
36	1	2	Paul Robinson	Ireland	1:48.61	
37	1	6	Leoman Momoh	Nigeria	1:49.25	
38	1	7	Taras Bybyk	Ukraine	1:49.39	
39	1	6	Moussa Camara	Mali	1:49.78	SB
40	4	8	Jeremiah Kipkorir Mutai	Kenya	1:50.17	
41	6	3	Wesley Vázquez	Puerto Rico	1:50.60	
42	2	1	Brice Etès	Monaco	1:53.60	
43	4	6	Ilia Mukhin	Kyrgyzstan	1:54.88	
44	3	7	Samorn Kieng	Cambodia	1:55.17	SB
45	3	4	Benjamín Enzema	Equatorial Guinea	1:56.82	SB
46	2	7	Manuel Antonio	Angola	1:57.40	
47	6	4	Ribeiro de Carvalho	Timor-Leste	2:04.74	PB
	2	4	Nijel Amos	Botswana	DNS	
	3	5	André Olivier	South Africa	DNS	

=== Semifinals ===
Qualification: First 2 in each heat (Q) and the next 2 fastest (q) advanced to the final.

Rank	Heat	Lane	Name	Nationality	Time	Notes
1	1	6	Duane Solomon	United States	1:43.87	Q
2	1	4	Abdulaziz Laden Mohammed	Saudi Arabia	1:44.10	Q, PB
3	1	5	Marcin Lewandowski	Poland	1:44.56	q
4	2	3	Mohammed Aman	Ethiopia	1:44.71	Q
5	2	4	Pierre-Ambroise Bosse	France	1:44.75	Q
6	1	7	Andrew Osagie	Great Britain & N.I.	1:44.85	q, SB
7	2	5	Brandon Johnson	United States	1:44.89	
8	3	4	Ayanleh Souleiman	Djibouti	1:44.99	Q
9	3	6	Nick Symmonds	United States	1:45.00	Q
10	1	2	Antoine Gakeme	Burundi	1:45.39	PB
11	3	3	Musaeb Abdulrahman Balla	Qatar	1:45.43	
12	3	7	Adam Kszczot	Poland	1:45.68	
13	1	1	Alexander Rowe	Australia	1:45.80	
14	3	2	Ronald Musagala	Uganda	1:45.87	
15	3	5	Anthony Chemut	Kenya	1:46.06	
16	3	1	Tamás Kazi	Hungary	1:46.40	
17	2	2	Samir Jamma	Morocco	1:46.53	
18	2	1	Luis Alberto Marco	Spain	1:46.75	
19	2	8	Michael Rimmer	Great Britain & N.I.	1:47.06	
20	2	7	Giordano Benedetti	Italy	1:48.31	
21	3	8	Amine El Manaoui	Morocco	1:49.08	
22	1	3	Kevin López	Spain	1:52.93	
23	2	6	Rafith Rodríguez	Colombia	2:01.94	
	1	8	Ferguson Rotich	Kenya	DQ	R163.3(a)

=== Final ===
The final was held at 21:10.

Rank	Lane	Name	Nationality	Time	Notes
1st place, gold medalist(s)	6	Mohammed Aman	Ethiopia	1:43.31	SB
2nd place, silver medalist(s)	3	Nick Symmonds	United States	1:43.55	SB
3rd place, bronze medalist(s)	4	Ayanleh Souleiman	Djibouti	1:43.76	
4	2	Marcin Lewandowski	Poland	1:44.08	SB
5	1	Andrew Osagie	Great Britain & N.I.	1:44.36	SB
6	5	Duane Solomon	United States	1:44.42	
7	8	Pierre-Ambroise Bosse	France	1:44.79	
8	7	Abdulaziz Laden Mohammed	Saudi Arabia	1:46.57	
