= 2013 World Championships in Athletics – Women's 1500 metres =

Women's 1500 metres at the 2013 World Championships
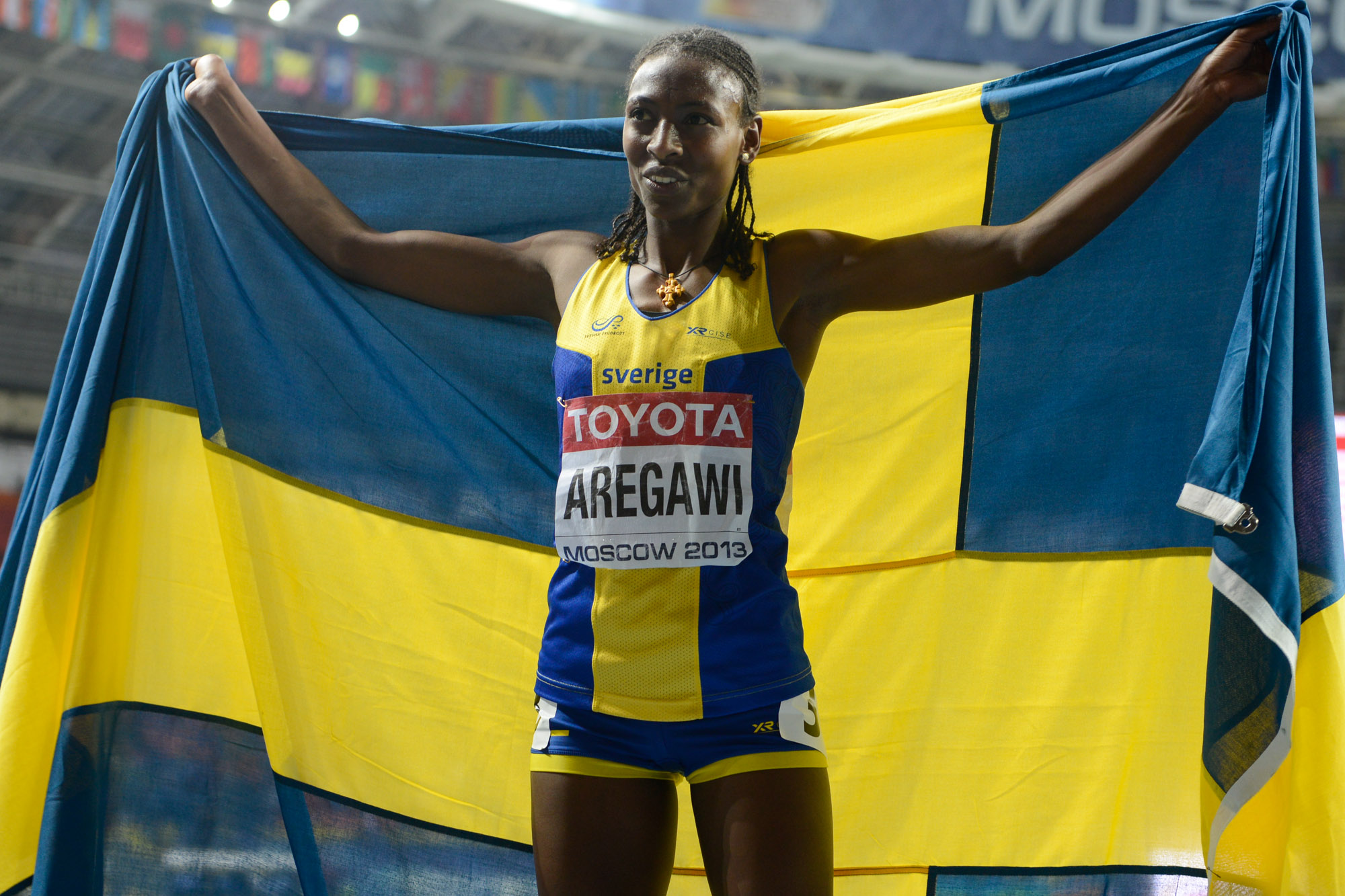
- Gold medalist Abeba Aregawi
- Venue: Luzhniki Stadium
- Dates: 11 August (heats); 13 August (semifinals); 15 August (final)
- Competitors: 37 from 23 nations
- Winning time: 4:02.67

Medalists
gold medal	Abeba Aregawi; Sweden
silver medal	Jennifer Simpson; United States
bronze medal	Hellen Onsando Obiri; Kenya

The women's 1500 metres at the 2013 World Championships in Athletics was held at the Luzhniki Stadium on the 11th, 13th and 15th of August.

From the start of the final, two Americans, defending champion Jennifer Simpson and super high-schooler Mary Cain bracketed the field and closed to fill in the front of the pack. But most of the pack stayed in close order formation throughout with much jockeying for position and flying elbows. Cain tried to stay on the curb but kept getting moved back as new suitors moved forward then fell back. Zoe Buckman came forward then went to the curb to suffer the same fate ahead of Cain. Throughout world leader Abeba Aregawi hovered near the front but not passing Simpson. With 300 to go, Aregawi went around Simpson and made a break for it. But Simpson and the rest of the pack didn't go away. Just 100 meters later, Simpson looked like she would go by, but Aregawi wouldn't let her by. Then Hellen Obiri moved up with momentum, but couldn't make her way around either of them. Aregawi gained a couple of steps around the final turn, but Simpson came back to make it a close finish. Obiri lost ground but held on to keep the bronze. Faith Chepngetich Kipyegon tried to hang on to her teammate but Hannah England made an impressive run from back in the pack to pass her on the inside to get fourth.

== Records ==
Prior to the competition, the records were as follows:

World record	Qu Yunxia (CHN)	3:50.46	Beijing, People's Republic of China	11 September 1993
Championship record	Tatyana Tomashova (RUS)	3:58.52	Paris, France	31 August 2003
World Leading	Abeba Aregawi (SWE)	3:56.60	Paris, France	10 May 2013
African Record	Hassiba Boulmerka (ALG)	3:55.30	Barcelona, Spain	8 August 1992
Asian Record	Qu Yunxia (CHN)	3:50.46	Beijing, People's Republic of China	11 September 1993
North, Central American and Caribbean record	Mary Slaney (USA)	3:57.12	Stockholm, Sweden	26 July 1983
South American record	Letitia Vriesde (SUR)	4:05.67	Tokyo, Japan	31 August 1991
European Record	Tatyana Kazankina (URS)	3:52.47	Zürich, Switzerland	13 August 1980
Oceanian record	Sarah Jamieson (AUS)	4:00.93	Stockholm, Sweden	25 July 2006

== Qualification standards ==
A time	B time
4:05.50	4:09.00

== Schedule ==
Date	Time	Round
11 August 2013	10:25	Heats
13 August 2013	20:40	Semifinals
15 August 2013	21:20	Final

All times are local times (UTC+4)

== Results ==
KEY:	Q	Qualified	q	Fastest non-qualifiers	NR	National record	PB	Personal best	SB	Seasonal best

=== Heats ===
Qualification: First 6 in each heat (Q) and the next 6 fastest (q) advanced to the semifinals.

Rank	Heat	Name	Nationality	Time	Notes
1	3	Genzebe Dibaba	Ethiopia	4:06.78	Q
2	3	Hellen Obiri	Kenya	4:06.98	Q
3	2	Zoe Buckman	Australia	4:06.99	Q
4	2	Jennifer Simpson	United States	4:07.16	Q
5	2	Yekaterina Sharmina	Russia	~~4:07.17~~	DQ
6	1	Abeba Aregawi	Sweden	4:07.66	Q
7	1	Siham Hilali	Morocco	4:07.82	Q
8	2	Rababe Arafi	Morocco	4:07.84	Q
9	1	Svetlana Podosenova	Russia	4:07.87	Q
10	1	Nancy Langat	Kenya	4:07.98	Q
11	3	Hannah England	Great Britain & N.I.	4:08.05	Q
12	1	Renata Pliś	Poland	4:08.20	Q
13	1	Mary Cain	United States	4:08.21	Q
14	3	Yelena Korobkina	Russia	~~4:08.33~~	DQ
15	3	Natalia Rodríguez	Spain	4:08.44	Q
16	3	Nicole Sifuentes	Canada	4:08.54	Q
17	3	Sonja Roman	Slovenia	4:08.58	q
18	1	Kate van Buskirk	Canada	4:08.65	q
19	2	Faith Kipyegon	Kenya	4:08.66	Q
20	1	Luiza Gega	Albania	4:08.76	q
21	1	Maureen Koster	Netherlands	4:08.99	q
22	3	Sarah Brown	United States	4:09.00	q
23	3	Btissam Lakhouad	Morocco	4:09.15	q
24	2	Mimi Belete	Bahrain	4:09.27	Q
25	3	Diana Sujew	Germany	4:09.40	
26	3	Ioana Doagă	Romania	4:09.78	
27	2	Sheila Reid	Canada	4:10.90	
28	2	Margherita Magnani	Italy	4:11.15	
29	1	Gelete Burka	Ethiopia	4:11.26	
30	2	Senbere Teferi	Ethiopia	4:11.41	
31	2	Cory McGee	United States	4:12.33	
32	2	Betlhem Desalegn	United Arab Emirates	4:12.97	
33	1	Laura Weightman	Great Britain & N.I.	4:14.38	
34	1	Rosibel García	Colombia	4:15.38	NR
35	3	Tuğba Koyuncu	Turkey	4:15.56	
36	2	Eliane Saholinirina	Madagascar	4:18.04	SB
37	1	Amela Terzić	Serbia	4:27.89	

=== Semifinals ===
Qualification: First 5 in each heat (Q) and the next 2 fastest (q) advanced to the final.

Rank	Heat	Name	Nationality	Time	Notes
1	1	Zoe Buckman	Australia	4:04.82	Q, PB
2	1	Faith Kipyegon	Kenya	4:04.83	Q
3	1	Yelena Korobkina	Russia	~~4:05.18~~	DQ
4	1	Mary Cain	United States	4:05.21	Q
5	1	Genzebe Dibaba	Ethiopia	4:05.23	Q
6	1	Nancy Langat	Kenya	4:05.30	q
7	1	Siham Hilali	Morocco	4:05.32	q
8	1	Svetlana Podosenova	Russia	4:05.36	
9	2	Abeba Aregawi	Sweden	4:05.66	Q
10	2	Hellen Obiri	Kenya	4:05.76	Q
11	2	Jennifer Simpson	United States	4:05.79	Q
12	1	Nicole Sifuentes	Canada	4:06.30	
13	2	Yekaterina Sharmina	Russia	~~4:06.49~~	DQ
14	2	Hannah England	Great Britain & N.I.	4:06.80	Q
15	2	Kate van Buskirk	Canada	4:07.36	PB
16	2	Renata Pliś	Poland	4:08.02	
17	1	Maureen Koster	Netherlands	4:08.15	
18	1	Sonja Roman	Slovenia	4:08.63	
19	1	Luiza Gega	Albania	4:08.79	
20	2	Natalia Rodríguez	Spain	4:09.18	
21	2	Rababe Arafi	Morocco	4:09.86	
22	2	Sarah Brown	United States	4:12.16	
23	2	Mimi Belete	Bahrain	4:14.22	
	2	Btissam Lakhouad	Morocco	DNF	

=== Final ===
The final was started at 21:20.

Rank	Name	Nationality	Time	Notes
1st place, gold medalist(s)	Abeba Aregawi	Sweden	4:02.67	
2nd place, silver medalist(s)	Jennifer Simpson	United States	4:02.99	
3rd place, bronze medalist(s)	Hellen Obiri	Kenya	4:03.86	
4	Hannah England	Great Britain & N.I.	4:04.98	
5	Faith Kipyegon	Kenya	4:05.08	
6	Zoe Buckman	Australia	4:05.77	
7	Genzebe Dibaba	Ethiopia	4:05.99	
8	Nancy Langat	Kenya	4:06.01	
9	Mary Cain	United States	4:07.19	
10	Siham Hilali	Morocco	4:09.16	
DQ	Yekaterina Sharmina	Russia	~~4:05.49~~	doping violation
DQ	Yelena Korobkina	Russia	~~4:10.18~~	doping violation
