= Great Britain and Northern Ireland at the 2013 World Championships in Athletics =

- WA code: GBR

in Moscow
- Competitors: 60
- Medals Ranked 7th: Gold 3 Silver 0 Bronze 3 Total 6

World Championships in Athletics appearances (overview)
- 1976; 1980; 1983; 1987; 1991; 1993; 1995; 1997; 1999; 2001; 2003; 2005; 2007; 2009; 2011; 2013; 2015; 2017; 2019; 2022; 2023; 2025

The United Kingdom of Great Britain and Northern Ireland (often referred to as Great Britain) competed at the 2013 World Championships in Athletics from August 10 to August 18 in Moscow, Russia. A team of 60 athletes was announced to represent the country at the event. The team finished with three gold medals and three bronze.

== Medallists ==
The following British competitors won medals at the Championships

Medal	Name	Event	Date
Gold	Mo Farah	10,000 metres	10 August
Gold	Christine Ohuruogu	400 metres	12 August
Gold	Mo Farah	5000 metres	16 August
Bronze	Margaret Adeoye; Eilidh Child; Shana Cox; Christine Ohuruogu	4 × 400 metres relay	17 August
Bronze	Tiffany Porter	100 metres Hurdles	17 August
Bronze	Hayley Jones; Annabelle Lewis; Ashleigh Nelson; Dina Asher Smith	4 × 100 metres relay	18 August

== Results ==
(q – qualified, NM – no mark, SB – season best)

=== Men ===
==== Track events ====
Athlete	Event	Preliminaries		Heats		Semifinals		Final	
Athlete	Event	Time	Rank	Time	Rank	Time	Rank	Time	Rank
Harry Aikines-Aryeetey	100 metres	BYE		10.16	3 Q	10.34	7	Did not advance	
Dwain Chambers	100 metres	BYE		10.14	3 Q	10.15	6	Did not advance	
James Dasaolu	100 metres	BYE		10.20	4 q	9.97	3 q	10.21	8
James Ellington	200 metres			20.55	1 Q	20.44	4	Did not advance	
Adam Gemili	200 metres			20.17 PB	1 Q	19.98 PB	1 Q	20.08	5
Delano Williams	200 metres			20.72	2 Q	20.61	7	Did not advance	
Nigel Levine	400 metres			45.41	4 Q	45.60	6	Did not advance	
Andrew Osagie	800 metres			1:46.16	3 Q	1:44.85 SB	4 q	1:44.36 SB	5
Michael Rimmer	800 metres			1:45.47	3 Q	1:47.06	6	Did not advance	
Chris O'Hare	1500 metres			3:38.86	8 q	3:43.58	4 Q	3:46.04	12
Mo Farah	5000 metres			13:23.93	5 Q			12:26.98	Gold medal
Mo Farah	10,000 metres							27:21.71 SB	Gold medal
William Sharman	110 metres hurdles			13.51	3 Q	13.34	5 q	13.30	5
Dai Greene	400 metres hurdles			49.79	4 Q	49.25	5	Did not advance	
Sebastian Rodger	400 metres hurdles			49.66	5 q	49.32	6	Did not advance	
Rhys Williams	400 metres hurdles			49.85	4 Q	49.29	4	Did not advance	
James Wilkinson	3000 metres steeplechase			8:35.07	9			Did not advance	
Alex Wright	20 kilometres walk							1:26:40	31
Harry Aikines-Aryeetey; James Dasaolu; James Ellington; Adam Gemili; Dwain Chambers; Richard Kilty	4 × 100 metres relay			38.12 SB	1 Q			DSQ	DSQ
Nigel Levine; Michael Bingham; Luke Lennon-Ford; Martyn Rooney; Conrad Williams; Delano Williams	4 × 400 metres relay			3:00.50 SB	2 Q			3:00.88	4

==== Field events ====
Athlete	Event	Preliminaries		Final	
Athlete	Event	Distance	Rank	Distance	Rank
Greg Rutherford	Long Jump	7.81	14	Did not advance	
Robbie Grabarz	High jump	2.29	1 q	2.29	8
Steve Lewis	Pole Vault	NM		Did not advance	
Brett Morse	Discus Throw	7.87	14	Did not advance	

Decathlon

Ashley Bryant	Decathlon			
Ashley Bryant	Event	Results	Points	Rank
	100 m	DNS		
	Long jump	DNS		
	Shot put	DNS		
	High jump	DNS		
	400 m	DNS		
	110 m hurdles	DNS		
	Discus throw	DNS		
	Pole vault	DNS		
	Javelin throw	DNS		
	1500 m	DNS		
Total			DNS	

=== Women ===
==== Track events ====
Athlete	Event	Preliminaries		Heats		Semifinals		Final	
Athlete	Event	Time	Rank	Time	Rank	Time	Rank	Time	Rank
Asha Philip	100 metres			11.29	3 Q	11.35	7	Did not advance	
Anyika Onuora	200 metres			23.36	4	Did not advance			
Jodie Williams	200 metres			23.00	4 q	23.21	7	Did not advance	
Christine Ohuruogu	400 metres			50.20	1 Q	49.75 SB	1 Q	49.41 NR	Gold medal
Jessica Judd	800 metres			2:01.48	5	Did not advance			
Laura Muir	800 metres			2:00.80	3 Q	2:00.83	7	Did not advance	
Marilyn Okoro	800 metres			1:59.43	2 Q	2:02.26	7	Did not advance	
Hannah England	1500 metres			4:08.05	3 Q	4:06.80	5 Q	4:04.98	4
Laura Weightman	1500 metres			4:14.38	11	Did not advance			
Tiffany Porter	100 metres Hurdles			12.72	1 Q	12.63 SB	1 Q	12.55 PB	Bronze medal
Perri Shakes Drayton	400 metres Hurdles			54.42	1 Q	53.93	1 Q	56.25	7
Eilidh Child	400 metres Hurdles			55.17	2 Q	54.32	3 Q	54.86	5
Meghan Beesley	400 metres Hurdles			55.45	2 Q	54.97 PB	6	Did not advance	
Eilish McColgan	3000 metres Steeplechase			9:35.82 PB	7 q			9:37.33	10
Sonia Samuels	Marathon							2:39:03 SB	16
Susan Partridge	Marathon							2:36:24	10
Asha Philip; Hayley Jones; Annabelle Lewis; Ashleigh Nelson; Bianca Williams; Dina Asher-Smith; Jodie Williams	4 × 100 metres relay			42.75	1 Q			42.87	Bronze medal
Margaret Adeoye; Eilidh Child; Shana Cox; Kirsten McAslan; Kelly Massey; Christine Ohuruogu; Victoria Ohuruogu; Anyika Onuora; Perri Shakes Drayton	4 × 400 metres relay			3:25.39	1 Q			3:22.61 SB	Bronze medal

Katarina Johnson-Thompson	Heptathlon			
Katarina Johnson-Thompson	Event	Results	Points	Rank
	100 m hurdles	13.49	1052	7
	High jump	1.83	1016	7
	Shot put	11.52	629	31
	200 m	23.37 PB	1042	2
	Long jump	6.56 PB	1027	2
	Javelin throw	40.86 PB	684	19
	800 m	2:07.64 PB	999	3
Total			6449 PB	5

==== Field events ====
Athlete	Event	Preliminaries		Final	
Athlete	Event	Distance	Rank	Distance	Rank
Shara Proctor	Long Jump	6.85	1 Q	6.79	6
Lorraine Ugen	Long jump	NM		Did not advance	
Sophie Hitchon	Hammer Throw	68.56	19	Did not advance	
