= Ethiopia at the 2013 World Championships in Athletics =

- WA code: ETH

in Moscow
- Competitors: 46
- Medals Ranked 6th: Gold 3 Silver 3 Bronze 4 Total 10

World Championships in Athletics appearances
- 1983; 1987; 1991; 1993; 1995; 1997; 1999; 2001; 2003; 2005; 2007; 2009; 2011; 2013; 2015; 2017; 2019; 2022; 2023

Ethiopia competed at the 2013 World Championships in Athletics from August 10 to August 18 in Moscow, Russia. A team of 46 athletes was announced to represent the country in the event. Ethiopia finished 6th at the Medal Table.

== Results ==
(q – qualified, NM – no mark, SB – season best)

=== Men ===
Athlete	Event	Heat		Semifinal		Final	
Athlete	Event	Time	Rank	Time	Rank	Time	Rank
Mohammed Aman	800 metres	1:44.93	1 Q	1:44.71	4 Q	1:43.31	1st place, gold medalist(s)
Aman Wote	800 metres	—					
Abiyote Abate	1500 metres	DNS	N/A	—			
Zebene Alemayehu	1500 metres	3:41.28	27 DNQ	—			
Mekonnen Gebremedhin	1500 metres	3:38.55	6 Q	3:43.54	14 Q	3:37.21	7
Aman Wote	1500 metres	3:38.89	15 q	3:36.94	8 DNQ	—	
Yenew Alamirew	5000 metres	13:23.48	5 Q	—		13:31.27	9
Yigrem Demelash	5000 metres	—					
Muktar Edris	5000 metres	13:20.82	1 Q	—		13;29.56	7
Hagos Gebrhiwet	5000 metres	13:23.22	4 Q	—		12:27.26	2nd place, silver medalist(s)
Kenenisa Bekele	10,000 metres	—				DNS	N/A
Dejen Gebremeskel	10,000 metres	—				27:51.88	16
Ibrahim Jeilan	10,000 metres	—				27:22.23	2nd place, silver medalist(s)
Abera Kuma	10,000 metres	—				27:25.27	5
Imane Merga	10,000 metres	—				27.42.02	12
Habtamu Fayisa	3000 metres steeplechase	8:29.08	DNQ	—			
Roba Gari	3000 metres steeplechase	8:45.06	DNQ	—			
Lelisa Desisa	Marathon	—				2:10:12	2nd place, silver medalist(s)
Tsegaye Kebede	Marathon	—				2:10:47	4
Feyisa Lilesa	Marathon	—				DNF	N/A
Tilahun Regassa	Marathon	—				DNS	N/A
Tadese Tola	Marathon	—				2:10:23	3rd place, bronze medalist(s)
Yemane Tsegay	Marathon	—				2:11:43	8

=== Women ===
Athlete	Event	Heat		Semifinal		Final	
Athlete	Event	Time	Rank	Time	Rank	Time	Rank
Tigist Assefa	800 metres	DNS	N/A	—			
Fantu Magiso	800 metres	2:01.11	20	—			
Gelete Burka	1500 metres	4:11.26	DNQ	—			
Genzebe Dibaba	1500 metres	4:06.78	1	4:05.23	5	4:05.99	8
Axumawit Embaye	1500 metres	DNS	N/A	—			
Senbere Teferi	1500 metres	4:11.41	DNQ	—			
Almaz Ayana	5000 metres	15:34.93	9	—		14:51.33	3rd place, bronze medalist(s)
Meseret Defar	5000 metres	15:22.94	1	—		14:50.19	1st place, gold medalist(s)
Tirunesh Dibaba	5000 metres	DNS	N/A	—			
Buze Diriba	5000 metres	15:23.41	2	—		15:05.38	5
Genet Yalew	5000 metres	DNS	N/A	—			
Meseret Defar	10,000 metres	—				DNS	—
Tirunesh Dibaba	10,000 metres	—				30:43.95	1st place, gold medalist(s)
Afera Godfay	10,000 metres	—				DNS	—
Belaynesh Oljira	10,000 metres	—				30:46.98	3rd place, bronze medalist(s)
Ababel Yeshaneh	10,000 metres	—				32:02.09	9
Sofia Assefa	3000 metres steeplechase	9:36.66	10	—		9:12.84	3rd place, bronze medalist(s)
Hiwot Ayalew	3000 metres steeplechase	9:24.49	3	—		9:15.25	4
Etenesh Diro	3000 metres steeplechase	9:24.02	1	—		9:16.97	5
Birtukan Fente	3000 metres steeplechase	DNS	N/A	—			
Tiki Gelana	Marathon	—				NM	DNF
Meseret Hailu	Marathon	—				NM	DNF
Aberu Kebede	Marathon	—				2:38:04	13
Meselech Melkamu	Marathon	—				NM	DNF
Merima Mohammed	Marathon	—				DNS	—
Feyse Tadese	Marathon	—				NM	DNF
