= 2013 World Championships in Athletics – Women's 3000 metres steeplechase =

Women's 3000 metres steeplechase at the 2013 World Championships
- Venue: Luzhniki Stadium
- Dates: 10 August (heats); 13 August (final)
- Competitors: 29 from 18 nations
- Winning time: 9:11.65

Medalists
gold medal	Milcah Chemos Cheywa; Kenya
silver medal	Lydiah Chepkurui; Kenya
bronze medal	Sofia Assefa; Ethiopia

Official Video

The women's 3000 metres steeplechase at the 2013 World Championships in Athletics was held at the Luzhniki Stadium on 10–13 August.

No Kenyan or Ethiopian had won the Women's Steeplechase at the World Championships. It became quickly obvious that was going to change. From the gun the three Kenyans and the three Ethiopians formed a pack that separated from the rest of the field. At the beginning of the 6th lap Sofia Assefa, running at the back of the back, tripped over a barrier and fell, losing several seconds to the field. She got back up and tried to catch back up to the pack. Hyvin Kiyeng Jepkemoi was the first to fall out the back, passed by Assefa. But Milcah Chemos Cheywa and Lydiah Chepkurui were on the front of train, stringing out the Ethiopians. Chemos, running determined after two successive bronze medals, led out the final lap, with Assefa chasing her teammates. Chemos held her slight lead all the way to the finish. Assefa caught Hiwot Alayew just before the water jump and continued to gain on Chepkurui. At the last barrier it looked like Assefa had the momentum to go by, but she seemed to lose a step after landing, Chepkuri ran away to the silver and Assefa making an impressive comeback to get bronze.

== Records ==
Prior to the competition, the records were as follows:

World record	Gulnara Samitova-Galkina (RUS)	8:58.81	Beijing, People's Republic of China	17 August 2008
Championship record	Yekaterina Volkova (RUS)	9:06.57	Osaka, Japan	27 August 2007
World leading	Lydiah Chepkurui (KEN)	9:13.75	Doha, Qatar	10 May 2013
African record	Milcah Chemos Cheywa (KEN)	9:07.14	Oslo, Norway	7 June 2012
Asian record	Liu Nian (CHN)	9:26.25	Wuhan, People's Republic of China	2 November 2007
North, Central American and Caribbean record	Jennifer Barringer (USA)	9:12.50	Berlin, Germany	17 August 2009
South American record	Sabine Heitling (BRA)	9:41.22	London, United Kingdom	25 July 2009
European record	Gulnara Samitova-Galkina (RUS)	8:58.81	Beijing, People's Republic of China	17 August 2008
Oceanian record	Donna MacFarlane (AUS)	9:18.35	Oslo, Norway	6 June 2008

== Qualification standards ==
A time	B time
9:43.00	9:48.00

== Schedule ==
Date	Time	Round
10 August 2013	17:20	Heats
13 August 2013	21:25	Final

All times are local times (UTC+4)

== Results ==
KEY:	Q	Qualified	q	Fastest non-qualifiers	NR	National record	PB	Personal best	SB	Seasonal best	WL	World leading

=== Heats ===
Qualification: First 5 in each heat (Q) and the next 5 fastest (q) advanced to the final.

Rank	Heat	Name	Nationality	Time	Notes
1	2	Etenesh Diro	Ethiopia	9:24.02	Q
2	2	Lydiah Chepkurui	Kenya	9:24.19	Q
3	2	Hiwot Alayew	Ethiopia	9:24.49	Q
4	2	Antje Möldner-Schmidt	Germany	9:29.27	Q, SB
5	2	Silvia Danekova	Bulgaria	9:35.66	Q, NR
6	2	Ancuța Bobocel	Romania	9:35.78	q, SB
7	2	Eilish McColgan	Great Britain & N.I.	9:35.82	q, PB
8	1	Milcah Chemos Cheywa	Kenya	9:36.16	Q
9	1	Hyvin Kiyeng Jepkemoi	Kenya	9:36.19	Q
10	1	Sofia Assefa	Ethiopia	9:36.66	Q
11	1	Valentyna Zhudina	Ukraine	9:37.79	Q
12	2	Diana Martín	Spain	9:39.22	q, SB
13	1	Salima El Ouali Alami	Morocco	9:39.95	Q
14	2	Natalya Gorchakova	Russia	9:42.12	q
15	1	Gesa Felicitas Krause	Germany	9:42.19	q
16	2	Katarzyna Kowalska	Poland	9:44.12	
17	1	Amina Bettiche	Algeria	9:45.50	
18	1	Sandra Eriksson	Finland	9:45.57	
19	2	Ashley Higginson	United States	9:45.78	SB
20	1	Shalaya Kipp	United States	9:45.97	
21	1	Beverly Ramos	Puerto Rico	9:49.60	
22	1	Lyudmila Lebedeva	Russia	9:49.64	
23	1	Sudha Singh	India	9:51.05	
24	2	Gladys Kipkemoi	Kenya	9:54.22	
25	2	Nicole Bush	United States	9:58.03	
26	1	Charlotta Fougberg	Sweden	9:59.17	
27	1	Natalya Aristarkhova	Russia	10:10.26	
	2	Bouaasayriya Kaltoum	Morocco	DQ	
	2	Fabienne Schlumpf	Switzerland	DQ	

=== Final ===
The final was held at 21:25.

Rank	Name	Nationality	Time	Notes
1st place, gold medalist(s)	Milcah Chemos Cheywa	Kenya	9:11.65	WL
2nd place, silver medalist(s)	Lydiah Chepkurui	Kenya	9:12.55	PB
3rd place, bronze medalist(s)	Sofia Assefa	Ethiopia	9:12.84	SB
4	Hiwot Alayew	Ethiopia	9:15.25	SB
5	Etenesh Diro	Ethiopia	9:16.97	SB
6	Hyvin Kiyeng Jepkemoi	Kenya	9:22.05	PB
7	Valentyna Zhudina	Ukraine	9:33.73	
8	Antje Möldner-Schmidt	Germany	9:34.06	
9	Gesa Felicitas Krause	Germany	9:37.11	SB
10	Eilish McColgan	Great Britain & N.I.	9:37.33	
11	Diana Martín	Spain	9:38.30	SB
12	Natalya Gorchakova	Russia	9:38.57	SB
13	Ancuța Bobocel	Romania	9:53.35	
14	Silvia Danekova	Bulgaria	9:58.57	
15	Salima El Ouali Alami	Morocco	10:08.36	
