= 2013 World Championships in Athletics – Women's 800 metres =

Women's 800 metres at the 2013 World Championships
- Venue: Luzhniki Stadium
- Dates: 15 August (heats); 16 August (semifinals); 18 August (final)
- Competitors: 32 from 21 nations
- Winning time: 1:57.38

Medalists
gold medal	Eunice Jepkoech Sum; Kenya
silver medal	Brenda Martinez; United States
bronze medal	Alysia Montaño; United States

Official Video

The women's 800 metres at the 2013 World Championships in Athletics was held at the Luzhniki Stadium on 15–18 August.

The first woman to break 2:00 was Hildegard Falck in 1971. At this meet, it almost took 2:00 to get into the semi-final. Through the first three heats, the slowest automatic qualifier was Halima Hachlaf at 2:00.04, with each race being split at low 57. In the final heat Eunice Jepkoech Sum managed to maintain order, splitting at just under a more leisurely 59 and bringing the three qualifiers in slower than the slowest time qualifier, Lenka Masná at 2:00.31. At that, world leader Francine Niyonsaba, returning medalists Caster Semenya and Janeth Jepkosgei were all missing.

In the final Alysia Montaño displayed tactics reminiscent of Johnny Gray, taking the race out in 26.80 and 56.06 splits opening up as much as a 15-meter lead on the field. Montaño hit the 600 at 1:26.45 with the lead but as she was slowing that's still a long way to get home. Sum had spent most of the last lap second to Montaño, but when defending champion Mariya Savinova tried to go past her at the head of the straight, she responded and held off the challenge. Both of them passed a dying Montaño 40 meters out with the rest of the field gaining rapidly. As she was passed on the inside by teammate Brenda Martinez, Montaño tossed herself at the finish line, collapsing to the track in fourth as Martinez took the bronze.

In 2015, Savinova and Ekaterina Poistogova were recommended for lifetime bans dating back to the 2012 Olympics as part of the wholesale Russian performance-enhancing drug scandal. On 10 February 2017, the Court of Arbitration for Sport (Cas) officially disqualified Savinova's results backdated to July 2010. When medal reallocations were decided, Montaño was given the bronze medal and Martinez the silver.

== Records ==
Prior to the competition, the records were as follows:

World record	Jarmila Kratochvílová (TCH)	1:53.28	Munich, West Germany	26 July 1983
Championship record	Jarmila Kratochvílová (TCH)	1:54.68	Helsinki, Finland	9 August 1983
World Leading	Francine Niyonsaba (BDI)	1:56.72	Eugene, US	1 June 2013
African Record	Pamela Jelimo (KEN)	1:54.01	Zürich, Switzerland	29 August 2008
Asian Record	Liu Dong (CHN)	1:55.54	Beijing, People's Republic of China	9 September 1993
North, Central American and Caribbean record	Ana Fidelia Quirot (CUB)	1:54.44	Barcelona, Spain	9 September 1989
South American record	Letitia Vriesde (SUR)	1:56.68	Gothenburg, Sweden	13 August 1995
European Record	Jarmila Kratochvílová (TCH)	1:53.28	Munich, West Germany	26 July 1983
Oceanian record	Toni Hodgkinson (NZL)	1:58.25	Atlanta, USA	27 July 1996

== Qualification standards ==
A time	B time
2:00.00	2:01.50

== Schedule ==
Date	Time	Round
15 August 2013	9:55	Heats
16 August 2013	20:15	Semifinals
18 August 2013	17:50	Final

All times are local times (UTC+4)

== Results ==
KEY:	Q	Qualified	q	Fastest non-qualifiers	NR	National record	PB	Personal best	SB	Seasonal best

=== Heats ===
Qualification: First 3 in each heat (Q) and the next 4 fastest (q) advanced to the semifinals.

Rank	Heat	Lane	Name	Nationality	Time	Notes
1	1	5	Brenda Martinez	United States	1:59.39	Q
2	1	3	Marilyn Okoro	Great Britain & N.I.	1:59.43	Q, SB
3	1	6	Mariya Savinova	Russia	1:59.44	Q
4	2	3	Alysia Montaño	United States	1:59.47	Q
5	1	2	Winny Chebet	Kenya	1:59.58	q. SB
6	2	6	Nataliia Lupu	Ukraine	1:59.59	Q, SB
7	1	4	Maryna Arzamasava	Belarus	1:59.60	q, SB
8	3	5	Malika Akkaoui	Morocco	1:59.63	Q
9	3	8	Ekaterina Poistogova	Russia	1:59.90	Q
10	3	7	Ajeé Wilson	United States	2:00.00	Q
11	2	7	Halima Hachlaf	Morocco	2:00.04	Q
12	3	1	Rose Mary Almanza	Cuba	2:00.27	q
13	3	4	Lenka Masná	Czech Republic	2:00.31	q, SB
14	4	6	Eunice Sum	Kenya	2:00.49	Q
15	4	3	Elena Kotulskaya	Russia	2:00.50	DSQ
16	2	2	Angie Smit	New Zealand	2:00.60	
17	4	2	Laura Muir	Great Britain & N.I.	2:00.80	Q, PB
18	3	3	Natoya Goule	Jamaica	2:00.93	
19	3	2	Olha Lyakhova	Ukraine	2:00.98	
20	4	1	Fantu Magiso	Ethiopia	2:01.11	
21	2	5	Jessica Judd	Great Britain & N.I.	2:01.48	
22	4	4	Kelly Hetherington	Australia	2:01.57	
23	4	7	Melissa Bishop	Canada	2:01.91	
24	2	8	Wang Chunyu	China	2:02.05	SB
24	2	4	Roseanne Galligan	Ireland	2:02.05	
26	4	8	Margarita Mukasheva	Kazakhstan	2:02.06	
27	1	7	Marta Milani	Italy	2:02.41	
28	1	1	Karine Belleau-Béliveau	Canada	2:02.93	
29	2	1	Marina Pospelova	Russia	2:03.42	
30	1	8	Eglė Balčiūnaitė	Lithuania	2:08.77	
31	4	5	Elena Mirela Lavric	Romania	2:10.37	
32	3	6	Elisabeth Mandaba	Central African Republic	2:14.35	SB

=== Semifinals ===
Qualification: First 3 in each heat (Q) and the next 2 fastest (q) advanced to the final.

Rank	Heat	Lane	Name	Nationality	Time	Notes
1	1	4	Alysia Montaño	United States	1:58.92	Q
2	1	5	Brenda Martinez	United States	1:59.03	Q
3	1	8	Nataliia Lupu	Ukraine	1:59.43	Q, SB
4	1	3	Ekaterina Poistogova	Russia	1:59.48	q
5	1	1	Lenka Masná	Czech Republic	1:59.56	q, PB
6	1	6	Halima Hachlaf	Morocco	2:00.55	
7	2	2	Eunice Sum	Kenya	2:00.70	Q
8	2	6	Mariya Savinova	Russia	2:00.73	Q
9	1	2	Laura Muir	Great Britain & N.I.	2:00.83	
10	2	7	Ajeé Wilson	United States	2:00.90	Q
11	2	1	Rose Mary Almanza	Cuba	2:00.98	
12	1	7	Winny Chebet	Kenya	2:01.04	
13	2	8	Maryna Arzamasava	Belarus	2:01.19	
14	2	5	Elena Kotulskaya	Russia	~~2:01.75~~	DSQ (doping)
15	2	4	Marilyn Okoro	Great Britain & N.I.	2:02.26	
16	2	3	Malika Akkaoui	Morocco	2:02.29	

=== Final ===
The final was started at 17:50.

Rank	Lane	Name	Nationality	Time	Notes
1st place, gold medalist(s)	2	Eunice Sum	Kenya	1:57.38	PB
2nd place, silver medalist(s)	5	Brenda Martinez	United States	1:57.91	PB
3rd place, bronze medalist(s)	3	Alysia Montaño	United States	1:57.95	
4	4	Ekaterina Poistogova	Russia	1:58.05	SB
5	8	Ajeé Wilson	United States	1:58.21	PB
6	7	Nataliia Lupu	Ukraine	1:59.79	
7	1	Lenka Masná	Czech Republic	2:00.59	
n/a	6	Mariya Savinova	Russia	~~1:57.80~~	DSQ (Doping)
