= Dorothy McMahan =

American long-distance runner

Personal information
- Born: November 6, 1976 (age 49) Hilbert, Wisconsin, United States
- Height: 5 ft 6 in (168 cm)

Sport
- Country: United States
- Sport: Track and field
- Event: Marathon
- College team: University of Wisconsin Milwaukee

Achievements and titles
- Personal bests: 800 m: 2:09.17 (2/02); 1 mile road: 4:35.2 (07/08); 5k road: 16:31 (12/10); 5k Track: 16:27 (2/13); 4 mile road: 21:55 (12/09); 8k road: 26:39 (4/13); 10k road: 33:24 (4/12 & 10/13); 15km: 51:56 (3/13); 10 mile: 55:36 (4/14); 20km: 1:09:32 (9/08); 1/2 Marathon: 1:11:48 (6/14); 25k: 1:25:52 (5/13); Marathon: 2:31:48 (6/11)
Medal record
Women's athletics
Representing the United States
World Athletics Half Marathon Championships
| 2005 Edmonton | Half Marathon |
| 2008 Rio de Janeiro | Half Marathon |
World Athletics Championships
| 2013 Moscow | Marathon |

Dorothy McMahan (born November 6, 1976) is an American long-distance runner. She competed in the marathon event at the 2013 World Championships in Athletics in Moscow, Russia.

== Personal life ==
Dorothy McMahan was raised in Hilbert, Wisconsin and graduated from UW-Milwaukee in 1999. Dot McMahan's daughter was born in May 2009. Dot placed 9th (2:32:16) at Houston Texas hosted 2012 US Olympic Trials in the Marathon.

== Coaching community ==
Since 2013, McMahan has coached distance runners for Boston Marathon qualifiers and personal best times in events from the mile to the 50 km.

== Professional ==
McMahan joined Hanson Brooks Original Distance Project in Rochester Hills, Michigan at age 22 and waited until 30 years old until debuting in the Marathon.

McMahan, alum of the University of Wisconsin-Milwaukee women's track and field team, placed 48th at the 14th IAAF World Half Marathon Championships, October 1, 2005 in Edmonton, Alberta, Canada.

In 2019, USATF named McMahan the national athlete of the week.
