= Russia at the 2013 World Championships in Athletics =

- WA code: RUS
- National federation: All-Russia Athletic Federation
- Website: eng.rusathletics.com

in Moscow
- Competitors: 105
- Medals Ranked 6th: Gold 1 Silver 2 Bronze 3 Total 6

World Championships in Athletics appearances (overview)
- 1993; 1995; 1997; 1999; 2001; 2003; 2005; 2007; 2009; 2011; 2013; 2015; 2017–2022; 2023

Other related appearances
- Authorised Neutral Athletes (2017–)

Russia competed at the 2013 World Championships in Athletics from August 10 to August 18 in Moscow, Russia as the host nation.

== Medalists ==
The following competitors from Russia won medals at the Championships (see below):

Medal	Athlete	Event
Gold	Yelena Isinbayeva	Pole vault
Silver	Yekaterina Koneva	Triple jump
Silver	Anna Chicherova	High jump
Bronze	Sergey Shubenkov	110 m hurdles
Bronze	Dmitriy Tarabin	Javelin throw
Bronze	Mariya Abakumova	Javelin throw

== Results ==
=== Men ===
Track & road events

Athlete	Event	Heat		Quarterfinal		Semifinal		Final	
Athlete	Event	Result	Rank	Result	Rank	Result	Rank	Result	Rank
Aleksandr Brednev	100 m	10.49	2 Q	10.52	7	Did not advance			
Aleksandr Khyutte	200 m	21.46	6	—		Did not advance			
Vladimir Krasnov	400 m	46.23	5	—		Did not advance			
Valentin Smirnov	1500 m	3:39.21	8 q	—		3:46.03	12	Did not advance	
Rinas Akhmadeev	5000 m	13:58:38	13	—				Did not advance	
Evgeniy Rybakov	10000 m	—						28:47.49	25
Konstantin Shabanov	110 m hurdles	13.38	3 Q	—		DNF		Did not advance	
Sergey Shubenkov	110 m hurdles	13.16 SB	2 Q	—		13.17	1 Q	13.24	3rd place, bronze medalist(s)
Timofey Chalyy	400 m hurdles	49.33	3 Q	—		50.06	5	Did not advance	
Denis Kudryavtsev	400 m hurdles	50.02	5	—		Did not advance			
Ilgizar Safiullin	3000 m steeplechase	8:28.65 PB	8	—				Did not advance	
Aleksey A. Sokolov (Алексей Соколов)	Marathon	—						2:17.12	24
Aleksandr Ivanov	20 km walk	—						~~1:20:58 PB~~	~~1~~; DQ
Andrey Ruzavin	20 km walk	—						1:32:45	49
Denis Strelkov	20 km walk	—						1:22:06	5
Ivan Noskov	50 km walk	—						3:41:36 PB	7
Mikhail Ryzhov	50 km walk	—						~~3:38:58 PB~~	~~2~~; DQ
Aleksandr Brednev; Aleksandr Khyutte; Denis Ogarkov; Konstantin Petryashov; Maksim Polovinkin; Roman Smirnov	4×100 m relay	39.01	7	—				Did not advance	
Maksim Dyldin; Lev Mosin; Sergey Petukhov; Vladimir Krasnov	4×400 m relay	3:01.81 SB	1 Q	—				~~2:59.90 SB~~	~~3~~; DQ

Field events

Athlete	Event	Qualification		Final	
Athlete	Event	Distance	Position	Distance	Position
Valeriy Iordan	Javelin throw	76.92	26	Did not advance	
Dmitriy Tarabin	Javelin throw	81.32	7 q	86.23	3rd place, bronze medalist(s)
Aleksey Tovarnov	Javelin throw	78.43	21	Did not advance	
Aleksandr Lesnoy	Shot put	19.01	21	Did not advance	
Maksim Sidorov	Shot put	19.63	13	Did not advance	
Soslan Tsyrikhov	Shot put	18.53	27	Did not advance	
Aleksey Korolev	Hammer throw	69.69	27	Did not advance	
Sergej Litvinov	Hammer throw	77.41	5 q	75.90	11
Aleksey Zagorniy	Hammer throw	NM		Did not advance	
Viktor Butenko	Discus throw	63.07	9 q	63.38	8
Aleksandr Gripich	Pole vault	5.40	21	Did not advance	
Sergey Kucheryanu	Pole vault	5.55	13 q	5.65	8
Aleksey Dmitrik	High jump	2.17	26	Did not advance	
Aleksandr Shustov	High jump	2.29	1 q	2.32 SB	7
Ivan Ukhov	High jump	2.29	1 q	2.34 SB	4
Aleksandr Menkov	Long jump	8.11	3 Q	8.56 NR WL	1st place, gold medalist(s)
Sergey Polyanskiy	Long jump	7.82	15	Did not advance	
Aleksey Fedorov	Triple jump	16.83	10 q	16.90	5

Combined events – Decathlon

Athlete	Event	100 m	LJ	SP	HJ	400 m	110H	DT	PV	JT	1500 m	Final	Rank
Artem Lukyanenko	Result	11.11	7.09	14.43	1.99	49.01 PB	14.21	44.06	5.00	61.83	4:32.97 PB	8177 PB	16
Artem Lukyanenko	Points	836	835	755	794	861	948	748	910	765	725	8177 PB	16
Ilya Shkurenev	Result	10.97	7.35	13.88	2.05 SB	48.39 PB	14.34	44.06	5.40 PB	59.46 PB	4:36.95	8370 PB	8
Ilya Shkurenev	Points	867	898	721	850	890	931	748	1035	730	700	8370 PB	8
Sergey Sviridov	Result	10.98	7.30 SB	14.20	1.90	51.13	15.23 SB	45.26	4.50 SB	69.38 PB	4:46.43 SB	7843	20
Sergey Sviridov	Points	865	886	741	714	763	822	772	760	880	640	7843	20

=== Women ===
Track & road events

Athlete	Event	Heat		Quarterfinal		Semifinal		Final	
Athlete	Event	Result	Rank	Result	Rank	Result	Rank	Result	Rank
Yelizaveta Savlinis	200 m	23.27	6	—		Did not advance			
Antonina Krivoshapka	400 m	51.27	3 Q	—		49.99	2 Q	~~49.78~~	~~3~~; DQ
Kseniya Ryzhova	400 m	50.69	1 Q	—		50.28	2 Q	50.98	7
Elena Kotulskaya	800 m	2:00.50	2 Q	—		2:01.75	7	Did not advance	
Ekaterina Poistogova	800 m	1:59.90	2 Q	—		1:59.48	4 q	1:58.05 SB	5
Marina Pospelova	800 m	2:03.42	8	—		Did not advance			
Mariya Savinova	1:59.44	3 Q	—		2:00.73	2 Q	~~1:57.80 SB~~	~~2~~; DQ	
Elena Korobkina	1500 m	4:08.33	4 Q	—		4:05.18 PB	3 Q	4:10.18	10
Svetlana Podosenova	1500 m	4:07.87	3 Q	—		4:05.36	8	Did not advance	
Yekaterina Sharmina	1500 m	4:07.17	3 Q	—		4:06.49	4 Q	4:05.49	6
Yelena Nagovitsina	5000 m	15:26.95	4 Q	—				15:24.83	9
Gulshat Fazlitdinova	10000 m	—						33:31.49	17
Tatyana Dektyareva	100 m hurdles	13.04	4 Q	—		12.91 SB	5	Did not advance	
Yuliya Kondakova	100 m hurdles	12.76 PB	2 Q	—		12.73 PB	2 Q	12.86	8
Natalya Antyukh	400 m hurdles	55.29	3 Q	—		55.55	6	Did not advance	
Irina Davydova	400 m hurdles	55.45	3 Q	—		55.05	7	Did not advance	
Anastasiya Ott	400 m hurdles	56.39	5	—		Did not advance			
Natalya Aristarkhova	3000 m steeplechase	10:10.26	14	—				Did not advance	
Natalya Gorchakova	3000 m steeplechase	9:42.12	9 q	—				9:38.57 SB	12
Lyudmila Lebedeva	3000 m steeplechase	9:49.64	11	—				Did not advance	
Tatyana Aryasova	Marathon	—						2:45:27	27
Alevtina Biktimirova	Marathon	—						2:45:11	26
Albina Mayorova	Marathon	—						2:41:19	21
Nadezhda Leontyeva	Marathon	—						2:42:49	22
Anisya Kirdyapkina	20 km walk	—						~~1:27:11~~	~~2~~; DQ
Yelena Lashmanova	20 km walk	—						1:27:09	1st place, gold medalist(s)
Vera Sokolova	20 km walk	—						DSQ	
Olga Kharitonova; Yelena Bolsun; Natalya Rusakova; Yelizaveta Savlinis; Viktoriya Yarushkina	4×100 m relay	42.94 SB	3 q	—				42.93 SB	6
Natalya Antyukh; Tatyana Firova; Yuliya Gushchina; Antonina Krivoshapka; Kseniya Ryzhova	4×400 m relay	3:23.51 SB	1 Q	—				~~3:20.19 WL~~	~~1~~; DQ

Field events

Athlete	Event	Qualification		Final	
Athlete	Event	Distance	Position	Distance	Position
Mariya Abakumova	Javelin throw	69.09	1 Q	65.09	3rd place, bronze medalist(s)
Viktoriya Sudarushkina	Javelin throw	62.20	8 Q	62.21	7
Yevgeniya Kolodko	Shot put	19.55	3 Q	19.81	5
Irina Tarasova	Shot put	18.37	7 q	18.37	7
Anna Bulgakova	Hammer throw	74.83	3 Q	~~74.62~~	~~5~~; DQ
Gulfiya Khanafeyeva	Hammer throw	72.47	7 q	71.07	12
Oksana Kondratyeva	Hammer throw	73.89	5 Q	72.76	7
Tatyana Lysenko	Hammer throw	74.60	4 Q	~~78.80 CR NR WL~~	~~1~~; DQ
Vera Karmishina-Ganeeva	Discus throw	58.37	15	Did not advance	
Svetlana Saykina	Discus throw	56.62	20	Did not advance	
Yekaterina Strokova	Discus throw	57.85	16	Did not advance	
Yelena Isinbayeva	Pole vault	4.55	1 q	4.89 SB	1st place, gold medalist(s)
Anastasia Savchenko	Pole vault	4.55	6 q	4.65	5
Angelina Zhuk-Krasnova	Pole vault	4.55	1 q	4.65	7
Anna Chicherova	High jump	1.92	1 Q	1.97	2nd place, silver medalist(s)
Irina Gordeeva	High jump	1.92	1 Q	1.93	9
Elena Slesarenko	High jump	1.83	20	Did not advance	
Svetlana Shkolina	High jump	1.92	1 Q	~~2.03 =PB~~	~~1~~; DQ
Darya Klishina	Long jump	6.70	5 q	6.76	7
Lyudmila Kolchanova	Long jump	6.53	14	Did not advance	
Olga Kucherenko	Long jump	6.59	10 q	6.81	5
Yelena Sokolova	Long jump	6.70	6 q	6.65	9
Irina Gumenyuk	Triple jump	14.30	7 Q	14.15	8
Yekaterina Koneva	Triple jump	14.30	6 Q	14.81	2nd place, silver medalist(s)
Anna Pyatykh	Triple jump	14.34	5 Q	14.29	7

Combined events – Heptathlon

Athlete	Event	100H	HJ	SP	200 m	LJ	JT	800 m	Final	Rank
Kristina Savitskaya	Result	13.82 SB	1.77 SB	13.75	25.43	6.11	38.21	DNS	DNF	
Kristina Savitskaya	Points	1004	941	777	838	883	633	0	DNF	
Aleksandra Butvina	Result	14.52	1.74	14.16	25.68	5.81	40.30	2:14.14	5809	26
Aleksandra Butvina	Points	906	903	805	825	792	673	905	5809	26
