= Germany at the 2013 World Championships in Athletics =

- WA code: GER
- National federation: Deutscher Leichtathletik-Verband
- Website: www.leichtathletik.de

in Moscow
- Competitors: 67
- Medals Ranked 5th: Gold 4 Silver 2 Bronze 1 Total 7

World Championships in Athletics appearances (overview)
- 1991; 1993; 1995; 1997; 1999; 2001; 2003; 2005; 2007; 2009; 2011; 2013; 2015; 2017; 2019; 2022; 2023; 2025

Germany competed at the 2013 World Championships in Athletics in Moscow, Russia, from 10 to 18 August 2013. Sixty-seven competitors were selected by the DLV.

== Medalists ==
The following competitors from Germany won medals at the Championships

Medal	Athlete	Event
Gold	Raphael Holzdeppe	Pole vault
Gold	Robert Harting	Discus throw
Gold	David Storl	Shot put
Gold	Christina Obergföll	Javelin throw
Silver	Michael Schrader	Decathlon
Silver	Christina Schwanitz	Shot put
Bronze	Björn Otto	Pole vault

== Results ==
=== Men ===
Track and road events

Athlete	Event	Heat		Semifinal		Final	
Athlete	Event	Result	Rank	Result	Rank	Result	Rank
Erik Balnuweit	110 metres hurdles	13.68	24	did not advance			
Arne Gabius	5000 metres	13:34.26	20	—N/a		did not advance	
Martin Keller	100 metres	10.32	34	did not advance			
Christopher Linke	20 kilometres walk	—N/a				1:22:36	9
Julian Reus	100 metres	10.27	30	did not advance			
Silvio Schirrmeister	400 metres hurdles	did not start					
Carsten Schlangen	1500 metres	3:40.31	23 Q	3:44.44	22	did not advance	
Homiyu Tesfaye	1500 metres	3:38.66	10 Q	3:36.51	6 q	3:37.03	5
Steffen Uliczka	3000 metres steeplechase	8:28.32	17	—N/a		did not advance	
Lucas Jakubczyk; Sven Knipphals; Julian Reus; Martin Keller	4 × 100 metres relay	38.13	3 Q	—N/a		38.04	5
David Gollnow; Eric Krüger; Thomas Schneider; Jonas Plass	4 × 400 metres relay	3:02.62	12	—N/a		did not advance	

Field events

Athlete	Event	Qualification		Final	
Athlete	Event	Distance	Position	Distance	Position
Sebastian Bayer	Long jump	7.95	10 q	7.98	9
Alyn Camara	Long jump	7.77	18	did not advance	
Markus Esser	Hammer throw	75.90	10 q	76.25	10
Lars Hamann	Javelin throw	77.10	24	did not advance	
Christoph Harting	Discus throw	62.28	13	did not advance	
Robert Harting	Discus throw	66.62	1 Q	69.11	1st place, gold medalist(s)
Raphael Holzdeppe	Pole vault	5.55	7 q	5.89	1st place, gold medalist(s)
Malte Mohr	Pole vault	5.55	3 q	5.82	5
Björn Otto	Pole vault	5.55	7 q	5.82	3rd place, bronze medalist(s)
Christian Reif	Long jump	8.09	4 q	8.22	6
Thomas Röhler	Javelin throw	74.45	30	did not advance	
Bernhard Seifert	Javelin throw	80.02	14	did not advance	
David Storl	Shot put	20.71	4 Q	21.73	1st place, gold medalist(s)
Martin Wierig	Discus throw	64.06	6 q	65.02	4

Combined events – Decathlon

Athlete	Event	100 m	LJ	SP	HJ	400 m	110H	DT	PV	JT	1500 m	Final	Rank
Pascal Behrenbruch	Result	10.95	7.19	15.86	1.99	48.40	14.46	45.66	4.70	67.07	4:37.21	8316	11
Pascal Behrenbruch	Points	872	859	843	794	890	916	780	819	845	698	8316	11
Rico Freimuth	Result	10.60	7.22	14.80	1.99	48.05	13.90	48.74	4.90	56.21	4:37.83	8382	7
Rico Freimuth	Points	952	866	777	794	907	987	844	880	681	694	8382	7
Michael Schrader	Result	10.73	7.85	14.56	1.99	47.66	14.29	46.44	5.00	65.67	4:25.38	8670	2nd place, silver medalist(s)
Michael Schrader	Points	922	1022	763	794	926	937	797	910	824	775	8670	2nd place, silver medalist(s)

=== Women ===
Track and road events

Athlete	Event	Heat		Semifinal		Final	
Athlete	Event	Result	Rank	Result	Rank	Result	Rank
Esther Cremer	400 metres	52.17	20 q	52.42	22	did not advance	
Nadine Hildebrand	100 metres hurdles	13.16	18 Q	13.04	16	did not advance	
Gesa Felicitas Krause	3000 metres steeplechase	9:42.19	15 q	—N/a		9:37.11	9
Sabrina Mockenhaupt	10000 metres	—N/a				did not finish	
Antje Möldner-Schmidt	3000 metres steeplechase	9:29.87	4 Q	—N/a		9:34.06	8
Tatjana Pinto	100 metres	11.38	22 q	11.54	24	did not advance	
Verena Sailer	100 metres	11.11	5 Q	11.16	10	did not advance	
Diana Sujew	1500 metres	4:09.40	25	did not advance			
Yasmin Kwadwo; Inna Weit; Tatjana Pinto; Verena Sailer	4 × 100 metres relay	42.65	5 q	—N/a		42.90	5

Field events

Athlete	Event	Qualification		Final	
Athlete	Event	Distance	Position	Distance	Position
Julia Fischer	Discus throw	60.09	13	did not advance	
Kristina Gadschiew	Pole vault	4.55	9 q	4.45	10
Betty Heidler	Hammer throw	68.83	18	did not advance	
Carolin Hingst	Pole vault	4.45	16	did not advance	
Marie-Laurence Jungfleisch	High jump	1.92	11 q	No mark	
Kathrin Klaas	Hammer throw	68.34	20	did not advance	
Lena Malkus	Long jump	6.49	16	did not advance	
Malaika Mihambo	Long jump	6.49	17	did not advance	
Sosthene Moguenara	Long jump	6.63	8 q	6.42	12
Katharina Molitor	Javelin throw	60.32	13	did not advance	
Nadine Müller	Discus throw	63.16	5 Q	64.47	4
Christina Obergföll	Javelin throw	62.36	7 Q	69.05	1st place, gold medalist(s)
Liza Ryzih	Pole vault	4.55	8 q	4.55	8
Christina Schwanitz	Shot put	19.18	4 Q	20.41	2nd place, silver medalist(s)
Silke Spiegelburg	Pole vault	4.55	1 q	4.75	4
Linda Stahl	Javelin throw	64.51	3 Q	64.78	4
Josephine Terlecki	Shot put	17.87	13	did not advance	

Combined events – Heptathlon

Athlete	Event	100H	HJ	SP	200 m	LJ	JT	800 m	Final	Rank
Kira Biesenbach	Result	13.88	1.71	12.91	did not finish					
Kira Biesenbach	Points	995	867	721	did not finish					
Julia Mächtig	Result	14.38	1.71	15.48	25.45	6.07	44.74	2:17.28	6021	17
Julia Mächtig	Points	925	867	893	846	871	758	861	6021	17
Claudia Rath	Result	13.55	1.83	12.88	24.27	6.67	39.04	2:06.43	6462	4
Claudia Rath	Points	1043	1016	719	955	1062	649	1018	6462	4
