= 2013 World Championships in Athletics – Women's 10,000 metres =

Women's 10,000 metres at the 2013 World Championships
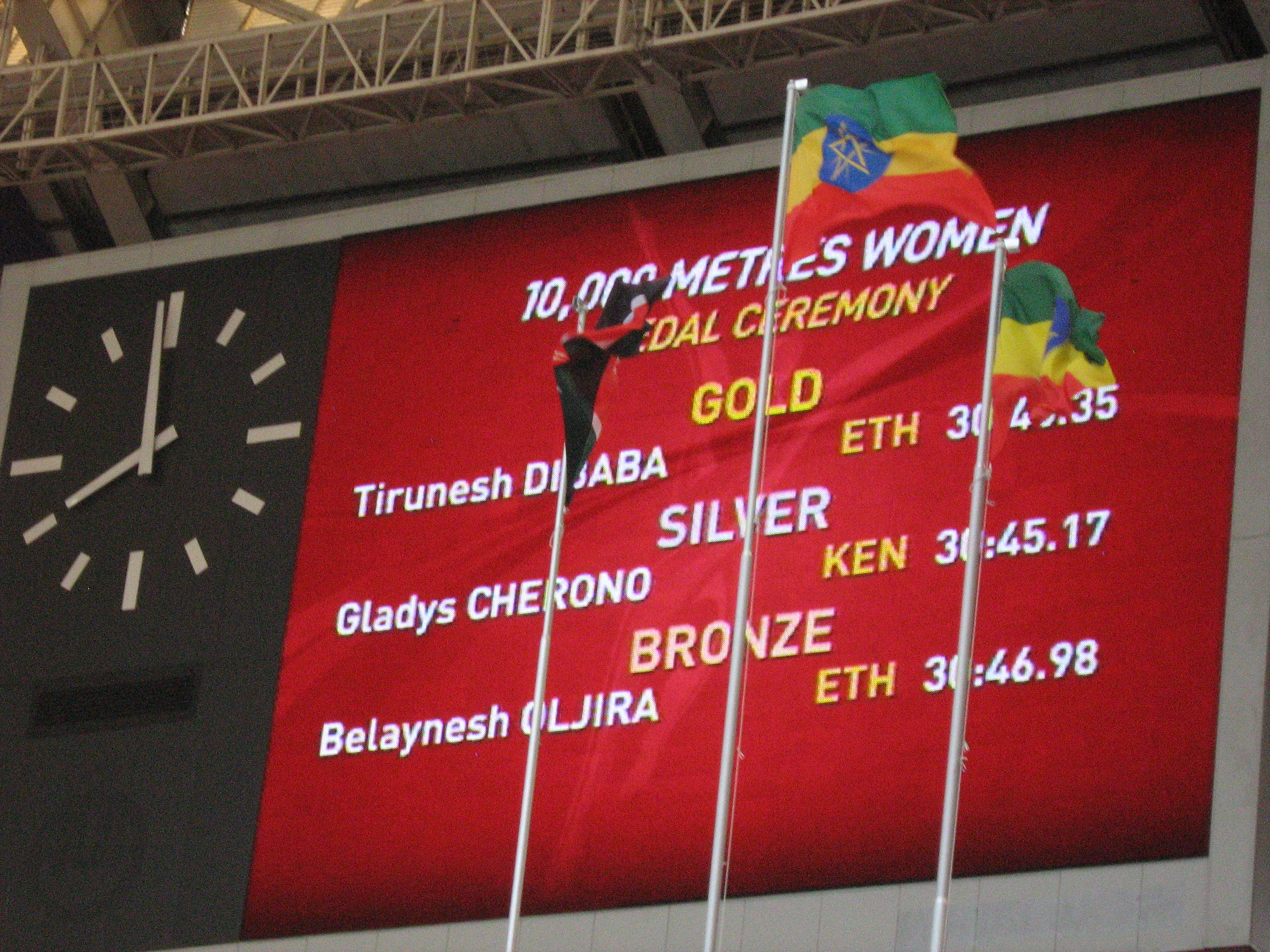
- Venue: Luzhniki Stadium
- Dates: 11 August (final)
- Competitors: 19 from 13 nations
- Winning time: 30:43.35

Medalists
gold medal	Tirunesh Dibaba; Ethiopia
silver medal	Gladys Cherono; Kenya
bronze medal	Belaynesh Oljira; Ethiopia

Official Video

The women's 10,000 metres at the 2013 World Championships in Athletics was held at the Luzhniki Stadium on 11 August.

At the beginning it was Shalane Flanagan who took out the pace, with the African contenders content to let her. Following was Hitomi Niiya, who after a brief rainshower took over the lead as Flanagan faded after the first 8 laps. Niiya held the lead until the final 600 meters as the pack dwindled. That was when Tirunesh Dibaba began to race seriously. Followed by her teammate, Belaynesh Oljira, the two Ethiopians picked up the pace with Kenyans Gladys Cherono and Emily Chebet giving chase, Niiya couldn't handle the acceleration and disappeared from contention. Even Oljira couldn't keep up with Dibaba's smooth pace to gold, she was passed by Cherono who gave a game effort and picked up the silver.

== Records ==
Prior to the competition, the records were as follows:

World record	Junxia Wang (CHN)	29:31.78	Beijing, China	8 September 1993
Championship record	Berhane Adere (ETH)	30:04.18	Paris, France	23 August 2003
World Leading	Meseret Defar (ETH)	30:08.06	Stockholm, Sweden	27 June 2013
African record	Meselech Melkamu (ETH)	29:53.80	Utrecht, Netherlands	14 June 2009
Asian record	Junxia Wang (CHN)	29:31.78	Beijing, People's Republic of China	8 September 1993
North, Central American and Caribbean record	Shalane Flanagan (USA)	30:22.22	Beijing, People's Republic of China	15 August 2008
South American record	Simone da Silva (BRA)	31:16.56	São Paulo, Brazil	3 August 2011
European record	Elvan Abeylegesse (TUR)	29:56.34	Beijing, People's Republic of China	15 August 2008
Oceanian record	Kim Smith (NZL)	30:35.54	Palo Alto, CA, United States	4 May 2008

== Qualification standards ==
A time	B time
31:45:00	32:05:00

== Schedule ==
Date	Time	Round
11 August 2013	21:05	Final

All times are local times (UTC+4)

== Results ==
KEY:	NR	National record	PB	Personal best	SB	Seasonal best

=== Final ===
The final was started at 21:05.

Rank	Name	Nationality	Time	Notes
1st place, gold medalist(s)	Tirunesh Dibaba	Ethiopia	30:43.35	
2nd place, silver medalist(s)	Gladys Cherono	Kenya	30:45.17	
3rd place, bronze medalist(s)	Belaynesh Oljira	Ethiopia	30:46.98	
4	Emily Chebet	Kenya	30:47.02	PB
5	Hitomi Niiya	Japan	30:56.70	PB
6	Shitaye Eshete	Bahrain	31:13.79	SB
7	Selly Chepyego Kaptich	Kenya	31:22.11	PB
8	Shalane Flanagan	United States	31:34.83	
9	Ababel Yeshaneh	Ethiopia	32:02.09	
10	Christelle Daunay	France	32:04.44	SB
11	Marisol Romero	Mexico	32:16.36	
12	Jordan Hasay	United States	32:17.93	
13	Ana Dulce Félix	Portugal	32:36.73	
14	Amy Hastings	United States	32:51.19	
15	Karolina Jarzyńska	Poland	32:54.15	
16	Juliet Chekwel	Uganda	32:57.02	NR
17	Gulshat Fazlitdinova	Russia	33:31.49	
	Sabrina Mockenhaupt	Germany	DNF	
	Lara Tamsett	Australia	DNF	
