= Canada at the 2013 World Championships in Athletics =

- WA code: CAN
- National federation: Athletics Canada
- Website: www.athletics.ca

in Moscow
- Competitors: 45
- Medals: Gold 0 Silver 1 Bronze 4 Total 5

World Championships in Athletics appearances (overview)
- 1976; 1980; 1983; 1987; 1991; 1993; 1995; 1997; 1999; 2001; 2003; 2005; 2007; 2009; 2011; 2013; 2015; 2017; 2019; 2022; 2023; 2025

Canada competed at the 2013 World Championships in Athletics in Moscow, Russia, from 10–18 August 2013. A team of 45 athletes represented the country in the event.

Canada won a total of 5 medals at the event, the most ever surpassing the 1995 edition in which the country won 4 medals.

== Medallists ==
The following competitors from Canada won medals at the Championships

| Medal | Athlete | Event | Date |
|---|---|---|---|
| Silver | Brianne Theisen-Eaton | Women's heptathlon | 13 August |
| Bronze | Damian Warner | Men's decathlon | 11 August |
| Bronze | Derek Drouin | Men's high jump | 15 August |
| Bronze | Dylan Armstrong | Men's shot put | 16 August |
| Bronze | Aaron Brown; Dontae Richards-Kwok; Gavin Smellie; Justyn Warner | 4 × 100 metres relay | 18 August |

== Results ==
(q – qualified, NM – no mark, PB – personal best, SB – season best)

=== Men ===
Track and road events

| Athlete | Event | Preliminaries | | Heats | | Semifinals | | Final | |
| Athlete | Event | Time | Rank | Time | Rank | Time | Rank | Time | Rank |
|---|---|---|---|---|---|---|---|---|---|
| Aaron Brown | 100 metres | | | 10.15 | 13 Q | 10.15 | 13 | did not advance | |
| Gavin Smellie | 100 metres | | | 10.30 | 31 Q | 10.30 | 20 | did not advance | |
| Sam Effah | 100 metres | | | 10.21 | 22 | did not advance | | | |
| Tremaine Harris | 200 metres | | | 20.68 | 22 | did not advance | | | |
| Anthony Romaniw | 800 metres | | | 1:47.98 | 34 | did not advance | | | |
| Nathan Brannen | 1500 metres | | | 3:38.49 Q | 5 | 3:36.59 q | 7 | 3:38.09 | 10 |
| Mohammed Ahmed | 10,000 metres | | | | | | | 27:35.76 SB | 9 |
| Cameron Levins | 10,000 metres | | | | | | | 27:47.89 SB | 14 |
| Alex Genest | 3000 metres steeplechase | | | 8:24.56 | 15 q | | | 8:27.01 | 13 |
| Matthew Hughes | 3000 metres steeplechase | | | 8:16.93 PB | 2 Q | | | 8:11.64 NR | 6 |
| Chris Winter | 3000 metres steeplechase | | | 8:29.36 | 23 | | | did not advance | |
| Aaron Brown; Dontae Richards-Kwok; Gavin Smellie; Justyn Warner | 4 × 100 metres relay | | | 38.29 | 6 Q | | | 37.92 SB | 3rd place, bronze medalist(s) |
| Rob Watson | Marathon | | | | | | | 2:16:28 SB | 20 |
| Inaki Gomez | 20 kilometres walk | | | | | | | 1:22:21 SB | 8 |
| Benjamin Thorne | 20 kilometres walk | | | | | | | 1:24:26 | 20 |
| Evan Dunfee | 50 kilometres walk | | | | | | | 3:59:28 PB | 36 |

Field events

| Athlete | Event | Preliminaries | | Final | |
| Athlete | Event | Width Height | Rank | Width Height | Rank |
|---|---|---|---|---|---|
| Derek Drouin | High jump | 2.29 | 8 q | 2.38 NR | 3rd place, bronze medalist(s) |
| Michael Mason | High jump | 2.17 | 25 | did not advance | |
| Shawnacy Barber | Pole vault | 5.40 | 27 | did not advance | |
| Dylan Armstrong | Shot put | 20.39 | 7 | 21.34 SB | 3rd place, bronze medalist(s) |
| Tim Nedow | Shot put | 18.72 | 24 | did not advance | |

Decathlon

| Damian Warner | Decathlon | | | |
| Damian Warner | Event | Results | Points | Rank |
|---|---|---|---|---|
| | 100 m | 10.43 | 992 | 2 |
| | Long jump | 7.39 | 908 | 14 |
| | Shot put | 14.23 PB | 742 | 13 |
| | High jump | 2.05 | 850 | 10 |
| | 400 m | 48.41 | 889 | 10 |
| | 110 m hurdles | 13.96 | 980 | 3 |
| | Discus throw | 44.13 SB | 749 | 13 |
| | Pole vault | 4.80 PB | 849 | 17 |
| | Javelin throw | 64.67 PB | 808 | 11 |
| | 1500 m | 4:29.97 SB | 745 | 10 |
| Total | | | 8512 PB | 3rd place, bronze medalist(s) |

=== Women ===
Track and road events

| Athlete | Event | Preliminaries | | Heats | | Semifinals | | Final | |
| Athlete | Event | Time | Rank | Time | Rank | Time | Rank | Time | Rank |
|---|---|---|---|---|---|---|---|---|---|
| Crystal Emmanuel | 200 metres | | | DQ | | Did not advance | | | |
| Kimberly Hyacinthe | 200 metres | | | 23.19 | 23 Q | 23.12 | 17 | Did not advance | |
| Alicia Brown | 400 metres | | | 53.26 | 30 | Did not advance | | | |
| Karine Belleau-Beliveau | 800 metres | | | 2:02.93 | 28 | did not advance | | | |
| Melissa Bishop | 800 metres | | | 2:01.91 | 23 | did not advance | | | |
| Sheila Reid | 1500 metres | | | 4:10.90 | 27 | did not advance | | | |
| Nicole Sifuentes | 1500 metres | | | 4:08.54 | 16 Q | 4:06.30 | 12 | did not advance | |
| Kate van Buskirk | 1500 metres | | | 4:08.65 | 18 q | 4:07.36 PB | 15 | did not advance | |
| Angela Whyte | 100 metres hurdle | | | 12.93 Q | 7 | 12.76 Q | 7 | 12.78 | 6 |
| Jessica Zelinka | 100 metres hurdle | | | 13.15 Q | 17 | 13.12 | 19 | Did not advance | |
| Noelle Montcalm | 400 metres hurdles | | | 57.50 | 24 | Did not advance | | | |
| Khamica Bingham; Shai-Anne Davis; Crystal Emmanuel; Kimberly Hyacinthe | 4 × 100 metres relay | | | 42.99 NR | 8 Q | | | 43.28 | 6 |
| Alicia Brown; Jenna Martin; Noelle Montcalm; Sarah Wells | 4 × 400 metres relay | | | 3:31.09 SB | 12 | | | did not advance | |
| Krista DuChene | Marathon | | | | | | | DNF | |
| Lanni Marchant | Marathon | | | | | | | 3:01:54 | 44 |

Field events

| Athlete | Event | Preliminaries | | Final | |
| Athlete | Event | Width Height | Rank | Width Height | Rank |
|---|---|---|---|---|---|
| Christabel Nettey | Long jump | 6.47 | 20 | did not advance | |
| Krista Woodward | Javelin throw | 58.86 | 17 | did not advance | |
| Sultana Frizell | Hammer throw | 69.06 | 16 | Did not advance | |

Heptathlon

| Brianne Theisen Eaton | Heptathlon | | | |
| Brianne Theisen Eaton | Event | Results | Points | Rank |
|---|---|---|---|---|
| | 100 m hurdles | 13.17 | 1099 | 1 |
| | High jump | 1.83 | 1016 | 6 |
| | Shot put | 13.07 | 732 | 16 |
| | 200 m | 24.18 | 963 | 6 |
| | Long jump | 6.37 PB | 965 | 4 |
| | Javelin throw | 45.64 SB | 776 | 10 |
| | 800 m | 2:09.03 PB | 979 | 6 |
| Total | | | 6530 PB | 2nd place, silver medalist(s) |

- Athletes in italics did not race.
