= Spain at the 2013 World Championships in Athletics =

- WA code: ESP
- National federation: Real Federación Española de Atletismo
- Website: www.rfea.es

in Moscow
- Competitors: 41
- Medals: Gold 0 Silver 2 Bronze 0 Total 2

World Championships in Athletics appearances (overview)
- 1976; 1980; 1983; 1987; 1991; 1993; 1995; 1997; 1999; 2001; 2003; 2005; 2007; 2009; 2011; 2013; 2015; 2017; 2019; 2022; 2023; 2025

Spain is competing at the 2013 World Championships in Athletics in Moscow, Russia, from 10–18 August 2013. A team of 41 athlete was announced to represent the country in the event.

== Medalists ==
The following competitors from Spain won medals at the Championships

Medal	Athlete	Event	Date
Silver	Miguel Ángel López	20 kilometres walk	11 August
Silver	Ruth Beitia	High jump	17 August

== Results ==
(q – qualified, NM – no mark, SB – season best)

=== Men ===
Track and road events

Athlete	Event	Preliminaries		Heats		Semifinals		Final	
Athlete	Event	Time	Rank	Time	Rank	Time	Rank	Time	Rank
Ángel David Rodríguez	100 metres			10.23	25	Did not advance			
Bruno Hortelano	200 metres			20.47 NR	9 Q	20.55	15	did not advance	
Sergio Ruiz	200 metres			20.88	30	did not advance			
Kevin López	800 metres			1:46.48	13 q	1:52.93	22	did not advance	
Luis Alberto Marco	800 metres			1:46.40	11 q	1:46.75	18	did not advance	
David Bustos	1500 metres			3:41.69	30	Did not advance			
Aelemayehu Bezabeh	5000 metres			13:34.68	21			Did not advance	
Sergio Sánchez	5000 metres			13:52.05	26			Did not advance	
Sebastián Martos	3000 metres steeplechase			8:32.63	25			Did not advance	
Abdelaziz Merzougui	3000 metres steeplechase			8:33.32	26			Did not advance	
Ángel Mullera	3000 metres steeplechase			8:19.26 SB	4 q			8:20.93	11
Bruno Hortelano; Ángel David Rodríguez; Sergio Ruiz; Eduard Viles	4 × 100 metres relay			38.46 NR	9			Did not advance	
Roberto Briones; Samuel García; Mark Ujakpor; Pau Fradera	4 × 400 metres relay			3:04.07 SB	16			Did not advance	
Javier Guerra	Marathon							2:14:33	15
Ayad Lamdassem	Marathon							DNF	–
Francisco Arcilla	20 kilometres walk							1:29:38	44
Miguel Ángel López	20 kilometres walk							1:21:21 SB	2nd place, silver medalist(s)
Álvaro Martín	20 kilometres walk							1:25:12	24
José Ignacio Díaz	50 kilometres walk							3:58:26	34
Jesús Ángel García	50 kilometres walk							3:46:44	12
Claudio Villanueva	50 kilometres walk							3:50:29	18

Field events

Athlete	Event	Preliminaries		Final	
Athlete	Event	Width Height	Rank	Width Height	Rank
Eusebio Cáceres	Long jump	8.25	1 Q	8.26	4
Igor Bychkov	Pole vault	NM	–	did not advance	
Borja Vivas	Shot put	18.97	23	Did not advance	
Yennifer Frank Casañas	Discus throw	63.17	8 q	62.89	9
Mario Pestano	Discus throw	62.80	10 q	61.88	12
Javier Cienfuegos	Hammer throw	70.79	25	did not advance	

=== Women ===
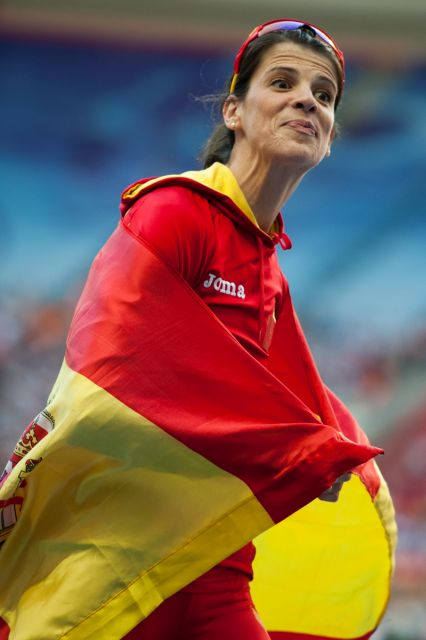
Ruth Beitia, bronze medalist in women's high jump

Track and road events

Athlete	Event	Preliminaries		Heats		Semifinals		Final	
Athlete	Event	Time	Rank	Time	Rank	Time	Rank	Time	Rank
Aauri Lorena Bokesa	400 metres			52.44	25 Q	51.94	17	did not advance	
Natalia Rodríguez	1500 metres			4:08.44	15 Q	4:09.18	20	did not advance	
Dolores Checa	5000 metres			15:43.73	12 q			15:30.42	10
Diana Martín	3000 metres steeplechase			9:39.22 SB	12 q			9:38.30	11
Alessandra Aguilar	Marathon							2:32:38	5
Lorena Luaces	20 kilometres walk							1:31:43	18
Beatriz Pascual	20 kilometres walk							1:29:00	6
Júlia Takács	20 kilometres walk							1:29:25	9

Field events

Athlete	Event	Preliminaries		Final	
Athlete	Event	Width Height	Rank	Width Height	Rank
Ruth Beitia	High jump	1.92	1 q	1.97	2nd place, silver medalist(s)
Úrsula Ruiz	Shot put	17.14	23	did not advance	
