= Takumi Saito (race walker) =

Japanese racewalker

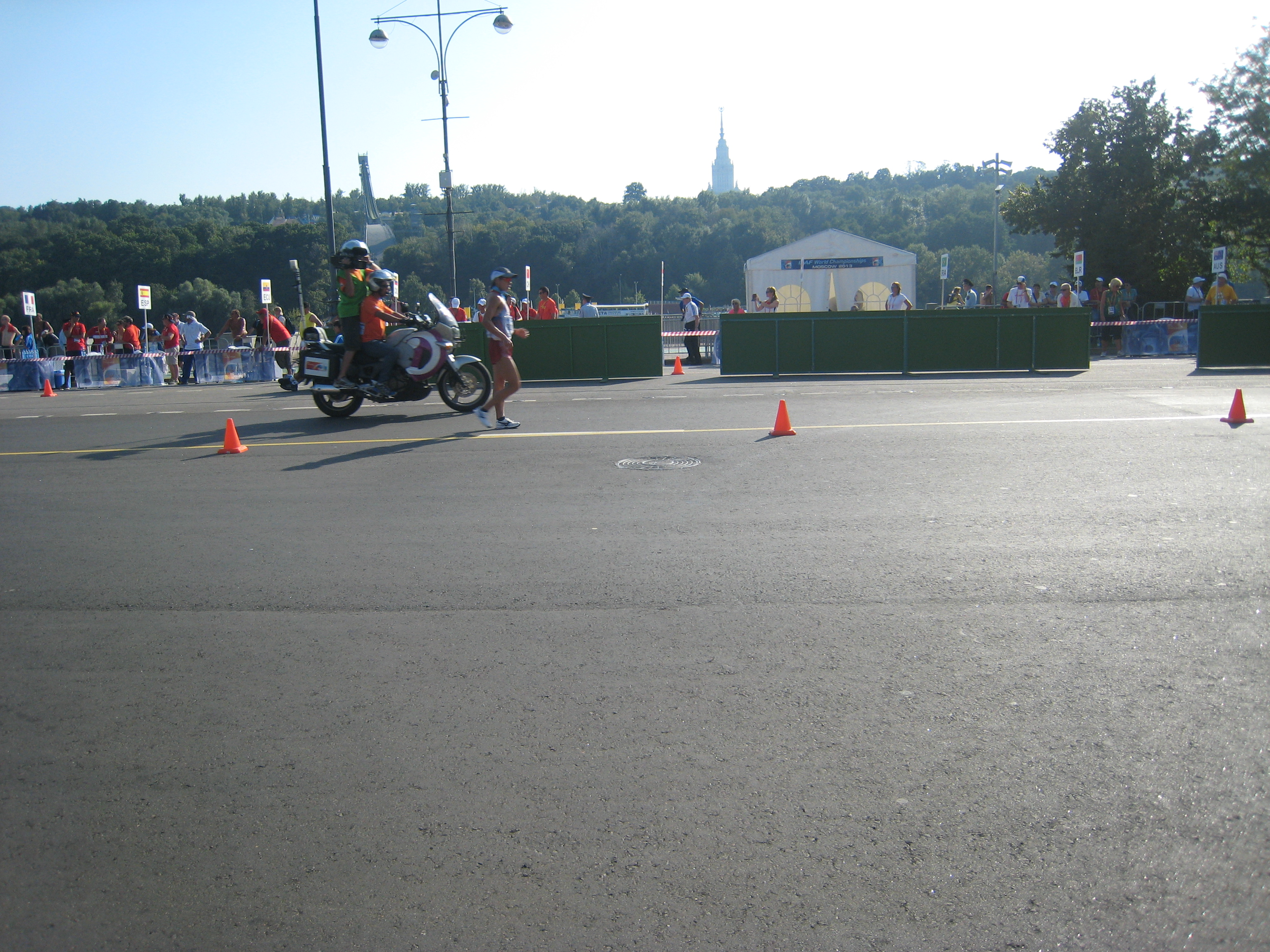
Saito during the 20 km race walk at the 2013 World Championships.

Takumi Saito (西塔 拓己, Saitō Takumi) (born 23 March 1993 in Kaita, Hiroshima) is a Japanese former racewalker. He placed 25th at the 20 km walk at the 2012 Summer Olympics, and 5th at the 2013 World Championships.

Saito represented Aichi Steel. He retired from professional competition in February 2020.
