= Andrew McCabe (sprinter) =

Australian sprinter (born 1990)

Personal information
- Born: 29 August 1990 (age 36) Longreach, Queensland
- Height: 188 cm (6 ft 2 in)
- Weight: 83 kg (183 lb)

Sport
- Country: Australia
- Sport: Athletics
- Event: 4 x 100m relay

Andrew McCabe (born 29 August 1990 in Longreach, Queensland) is an Australian track and field sprinter. He was a member of the Australian 4 × 100 m relay team that equalled the Australian record when they qualified for the finals at the 2012 London Olympics.
