= Bernard Kiprop Koech =

Kenyan long-distance runner

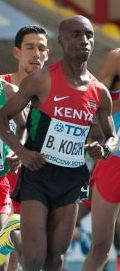
Koech at the 2013 World Championships

Bernard Kiprop Koech (born 31 January 1988) is a Kenyan long-distance runner who specialises in road running events. He has a personal best of 2:04:09 hours for the marathon and 59:10 minutes for the half marathon. He represented Kenya at the 2013 World Championships in Athletics.

== Career ==
Koech began to make an impact on the Kenyan national cross country running circuit in his late teens. He was fourth at the Tuskys Wareng Cross Country in November 2009, then achieved a win at one of the Athletics Kenya meets at the start of 2010, beating Olympic champion Asbel Kiprop and steeplechase world record holder Saif Saaeed Shaheen. He failed to build on this at the Kenyan Cross Country Championships, finishing outside of the top fifty.

After missing the 2011 season he re-emerged as a road specialist. He was eighth at the Discovery Half Marathon in January and his outing at the Paris Half Marathon established him firmly in the elite, as he placed second with a time of 1:00:06 hours. He was a little slower at the CPC Loop Den Haag a week later but ran under an hour at the following month's Nice Half Marathon, winning that race in 59:57 minutes. He dropped his personal best further at the Lille Half Marathon, where he was runner-up to Ezekiel Chebii with a run of 59:10 minutes. He ended the year as the fifth-ranked half marathon runner in the world.

Koech's debut over the marathon distance came at the start of 2013. He successfully translated his half marathon abilities to the longer event at the Dubai Marathon as he finished in 2:04:53 hours in fifth place (eight seconds behind winner Lelisa Desisa). This instantly raised him into the top twenty fastest marathon runners ever. As a result, he was selected to compete at the 2013 World Championships in Athletics in the marathon – his brother Bethwell Birgen was also chosen for the 1500 metres. He only had two further races prior to the event: first he won the Lisbon Half Marathon with a run of 59:54 minutes. After that he won the Rock 'n' Roll San Diego Half Marathon with the fastest time ever run in the United States (58:41 minutes – the fourth fastest ever for the event – although this was not an official record as the course was downhill). Despite being one of the fastest entrants into the World Championships marathon and sticking with the pace up to the 30-kilometer mark, he dropped out after that point and did not finish his first championship race. October's Amsterdam Marathon was his third marathon race that year and this time he managed to finish, placing third with 2:06:29 hours.
