= Japan at the 2013 World Championships in Athletics =

- WA code: JPN
- National federation: Japan Association of Athletics Federations
- Website: www.jaaf.or.jp/english/

in Moscow
- Competitors: 44 (men: 32; women: 12)
- Medals: Gold 0 Silver 0 Bronze 1 Total 1

World Championships in Athletics appearances
- 1983; 1987; 1991; 1993; 1995; 1997; 1999; 2001; 2003; 2005; 2007; 2009; 2011; 2013; 2015; 2017; 2019; 2022; 2023; 2025

Japan sent 41 athletes to the 14th IAAF World Championships in Moscow, Russia. The Japan team were announced by the Japan Association of Athletics Federations after the 2013 Japan Championships in Athletics.

== Medallists ==
Medal	Name	Event	Date
Bronze	Kayoko Fukushi	Marathon	11 August

== Team selection ==
Track and road events

Event	Athletes	
Event	Men	Women
Sprint	Ryota Yamagata Yoshihide Kiryu; Shota Iizuka; Yuichi Kobayashi; Kei Takase; Kenji Fujimitsu; Yuzo Kanemaru	Chisato Fukushima
Distance	Yuki Sato; Suguru Osako; Tsuyoshi Ugachi	Misaki Onishi Hitomi Niiya
Hurdle	Takayuki Kishimoto Yasuhiro Fueki; Takatoshi Abe	Hitomi Shimura Satomi Kubokura
Mile Relay	Yuzo Kanemaru Kengo Yamazaki; Hiroyuki Nakano; Hideyuki Hirose	-
Marathon	Kazuhiro Maeda Hiroyuki Horibata; Yuki Kawauchi; Masakazu Fujiwara; Kentaro Nakamoto	Ryoko Kizaki Kayoko Fukushi; Mizuki Noguchi
Race walking	Yusuke Suzuki Takumi Saito; Takayuki Tanii; Hirooki Arai; Koichiro Morioka	Masumi Fuchise Kumi Otoshi

Field and combined events

Event	Athletes	
Event	Men	Women
Jumping	Seito Yamamoto Daichi Sawano; Hiroki Ogita	Miyuki Fukumoto
Throwing	Koji Murofushi Yukifumi Murakami	Yuki Ebihara
Combined event	Keisuke Ushiro	-

== Women ==
Track & road events

Athlete	Event	Preliminaries		Heats		Semifinals		Final	
Athlete	Event	Time	Rank	Time	Rank	Time	Rank	Time	Rank
Chisato Fukushima	200 metres			23.85	37	Did not advance			
Misaki Onishi	5000 metres			16:16.52	19	Did not advance			
Hitomi Niiya	10,000 metres							30:56.70	5
Hitomi Shimura				13.72	34	Did not advance			
Satomi Kubokura	400			56.33	16:16.52	Did not advance			
Kayoko Fukushi								2:27:45	3rd place, bronze medalist(s)
Ryoko Kizaki								2:31:28	4th
Mizuki Noguchi								DNF	
Kumi Otoshi	20 kilometres walk							1:32:44	26th
Masumi Fuchise	20 kilometres walk							1:33:13	28th

Field

Athlete	Event	Qualification		Final	
Athlete	Event	Distance	Position	Distance	Position
Yuki Ebihara	Javelin	59.80	16	did not advance	
Miyuki Fukumoto	High Jump	1.78	27	did not advance	
