= Jamaica at the 2013 World Championships in Athletics =

- WA code: JAM

in Moscow
- Competitors: 45
- Medals: Gold 6 Silver 2 Bronze 1 Total 9

World Championships in Athletics appearances
- 1983; 1987; 1991; 1993; 1995; 1997; 1999; 2001; 2003; 2005; 2007; 2009; 2011; 2013; 2015; 2017; 2019; 2022; 2023; 2025

Jamaica competed at the 2013 World Championships in Athletics in Moscow, Russia, from 10 to 18 August 2013. A team of 45 athletes was announced to represent the country in the event.

== Results ==
(q – qualified, NM – no mark, SB – season best)

=== Men ===
Track and road events

Athlete	Event	Preliminaries		Heats		Semifinals		Final	
Athlete	Event	Time	Rank	Time	Rank	Time	Rank	Time	Rank
Nickel Ashmeade	100 metres			10.12	9 Q	9.90	1 Q	9.98	5
Kemar Bailey-Cole	100 metres			10.02	3 Q	9.93	3 Q	9.98	4
Usain Bolt	100 metres			10.07	7 Q	9.92	2 Q	9.77	1st place, gold medalist(s)
Nesta Carter	100 metres			10.11	8 Q	9.97	6 Q	9.95	3rd place, bronze medalist(s)
Nickel Ashmeade	200 metres			20.54	13 Q	20.00	3 Q	20.05	4
Usain Bolt	200 metres			20.66	21 Q	20.12	4 Q	19.66	1st place, gold medalist(s)
Jason Livermore	200 metres			20.59	17 Q	20.46	12	did not advance	
Warren Weir	200 metres			20.34	3 Q	20.20	7 Q	19.79	2nd place, silver medalist(s)
Javere Bell	400 metres			45.20	7 Q	45.77	17	did not advance	
Javon Francis	400 metres			45.37	11 Q	45.62	15	did not advance	
Omar Johnson	400 metres			45.97	21 q	45.89	19	did not advance	
Hansle Parchment	110 metres hurdle			13.43	13 q	DNF	-	did not advance	
Andrew Riley	110 metres hurdle			13.27	3 Q	13.30	4 q	13.51	8
Dwight Thomas	110 metres hurdle			DNS	-	did not advance			
Leford Green	400 metres hurdles			49.45	7 Q	48.88	10	did not advance	
Isa Phillips	400 metres hurdles			49.57	9 Q	49.28	13	did not advance	
Annsert Whyte	400 metres hurdles			49.63	10 Q	49.17	11	did not advance	
Nickel Ashmeade; Oshane Bailey; Kemar Bailey-Cole; Usain Bolt; Nesta Carter; Jason Livermore	4 × 100 metres relay							37.36 WL	1st place, gold medalist(s)
Javere Bell; Javon Francis; Akheem Gauntlett; Omar Johnson; Rusheen McDonald; Edino Steele	4 × 400 metres relay			3.00.41	2 Q			2.59.88	2nd place, silver medalist(s)

Field events

Athlete	Event	Preliminaries		Final	
Athlete	Event	Width Height	Rank	Width Height	Rank
Damar Forbes	Long jump	7.96	7 q	8.02	8
Raymond Brown	Shot put	DNS	-	did not advance	
O'Dayne Richards	Shot put	19.08	20	did not advance	

=== Women ===
Track and road events

Athlete	Event	Preliminaries		Heats		Semifinals		Final	
Athlete	Event	Time	Rank	Time	Rank	Time	Rank	Time	Rank
Sheri-Ann Brooks	100 metres			11.32	18Q	11.40	19	-	-
Schillonie Calvert	100 metres			11.20	11Q	11.28	12	-	-
Shelly-Ann Fraser-Pryce	100 metres			11.15	7Q	10.87	1Q	10.71 WL	1st place, gold medalist(s)
Kerron Stewart	100 metres			11.02	2Q	10.97	4Q	10.97	5
Patricia Hall	200 metres			23.25	27Q	23.26	22	-	-
Shelly-Ann Fraser-Pryce	200 metres			22.78	=6Q	22.54	4Q	22.17	1st place, gold medalist(s)
Anneisha McLaughlin	200 metres			22.78	=6Q	27.13	24	-	-
Patricia Hall	400 metres			52.20	21Q	52.62	24	-	-
Stephanie McPherson	400 metres			50.98	7Q	49.99	=5q	49.99	4
Novlene Williams-Mills	400 metres			50.83	6Q	50.34	7q	51.49	8
Natoya Goule	800 metres			2:00.93	18	-	-	-	-
Andrea Bliss	100 metres hurdles			13.20	22q	12.92	13	-	-
Danielle Williams	100 metres hurdles			13.11	16Q	13.13	20	-	-
Shermaine Williams	100 metres hurdles			13.09	15Q	12.93 SB	14	-	-
Danielle Dowie	400 metres hurdles			57.03	22	-	-	-	-
Kaliese Spencer	400 metres hurdles			DSQ	-	-	-	-	-
Ristananna Tracey	400 metres hurdles			55.94	15q	55.43	12	-	-
Nickiesha Wilson	400 metres hurdles			55.75	13Q	54.94 SB	8q	57.34	8
*Sheri-Ann Brooks; Schillonie Calvert; Shelly-Ann Fraser-Pryce; Carrie Russell; Kerron Stewart	4 × 100 metres relay			41.87 SB	2Q			41.29 CR, NR	1st place, gold medalist(s)
Christine Day; Patricia Hall; Anastasia Le-Roy; Stephanie McPherson; Rosemarie Whyte; Novlene Williams-Mills	4 × 400 metres relay			DSQ	-			-	-

Field events

Athlete	Event	Preliminaries		Final	
Athlete	Event	Width Height	Rank	Width Height	Rank
Francine Simpson	Long jump	NM	-	-	-
Kimberly Williams	Triple jump	14.36	5Q	14.62 PB	4
