= Will Oyowe =

Belgian sprinter

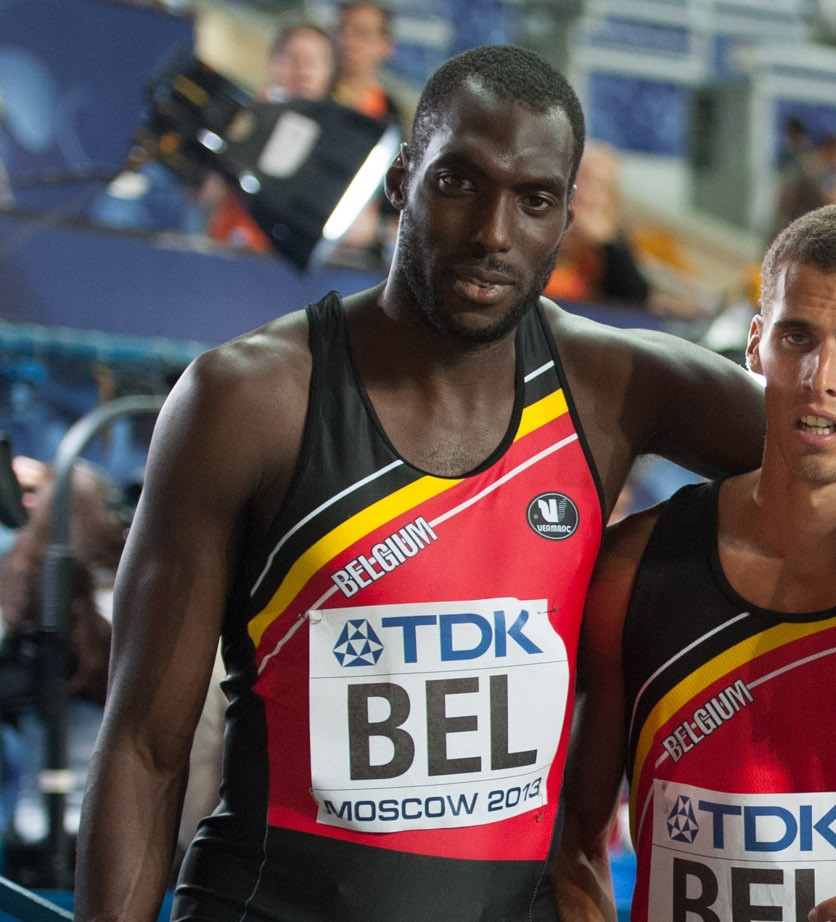

Personal information
- National team: Belgium
- Born: 28 October 1987 (age 38) Etterbeek, Belgium

Sport
- Sport: Athletics
- Event: 400 metres
- Club: USBW

Achievements and titles
- Personal best: 400 m: 45.88 (2013)

Will Oyowe (born 28 October 1987) is a Belgian sprinter.

== Achievements ==
| Year | Competition | Venue | Rank | Event | Time | Notes |
|---|---|---|---|---|---|---|
| 2013 | World Championships | (Russia) Moscow | 4th | 4 × 400 m relay | 3:01.01 | |

== National titles ==
Oyowe won a national championship at individual senior level.

- Belgian Indoor Athletics Championships
  - 200 m: 2014
