= 2013 World Championships in Athletics – Men's 400 metres =

Men's 400 metres at the 2013 World Championships
- Venue: Luzhniki Stadium
- Dates: 11 August (heats); 12 August (semifinals); 13 August (final)
- Competitors: 35 from 26 nations
- Winning time: 43.74

Medalists
gold medal	LaShawn Merritt; United States
silver medal	Tony McQuay; United States
bronze medal	Luguelín Santos; Dominican Republic

Official Video

The men's 400 metres at the 2013 World Championships in Athletics was held at the Luzhniki Stadium on 11–13 August. The winning margin was 0.66 seconds.

The final had the 2008 Olympic Champion/2009 World Champion LaShawn Merritt and current defending champion and Olympic champion Kirani James in lanes 6 and 5 respectively. At the gun, Merritt took it out hard, passing Luguelín Santos to his outside and leaving him a couple meters behind at the halfway mark. James worked hard along the backstretch and into the turn to keep up with Merritt reaching the final straight two meters back, Jonathan Borlée one meter further back while the rest of the field almost 5 meters back with Santos the last out of the turn. Then the long striding James began to flail in quicksand. As Merritt charged home for the personal best 43.74 win, James fell back through the field. In lane 4, Tony McQuay asserted himself against the rest of the field, the first to pass James and run home for the silver. Borlée was clearly the next but Santos came from last position to catch him just before the line to take the bronze.

== Records ==
Prior to the competition, the records were as follows:

World record	Michael Johnson (USA)	43.18	Sevilla, Spain	26 August 1999
Championship record	Michael Johnson (USA)	43.18	Sevilla, Spain	26 August 1999
World Leading	Kirani James (GRN)	43.96	Saint-Denis, France	6 July 2013
African Record	Gary Kikaya (COD)	44.10	Stuttgart, Germany	9 September 2006
Asian Record	Mohamed Amer Al-Malky (OMA)	44.56	Budapest, Hungary	12 August 1988
North, Central American and Caribbean record	Michael Johnson (USA)	43.18	Seville, Spain	26 August 1999
South American Record	Sanderlei Parrela (BRA)	44.29	Seville, Spain	26 August 1999
European Record	Thomas Schönlebe (GDR)	44.33	Rome, Italy	3 September 1987
Oceanian record	Darren Clark (AUS)	44.38	Seoul, South Korea	26 September 1988

== Qualification standards ==
A time	B time
45.28	45.60

== Schedule ==
Date	Time	Round
11 August 2013	11:05	Heats
12 August 2013	20:05	Semifinals
13 August 2013	21:50	Final

== Results ==
KEY:	q	Fastest non-qualifiers	Q	Qualified	NR	National record	PB	Personal best	SB	Seasonal best

=== Heats ===
Qualification: First 4 in each heat (Q) and the next 4 fastest (q) advanced to the semifinals.

Rank	Heat	Lane	Name	Nationality	Time	Notes
1	3	6	LaShawn Merritt	United States	44.92	Q
2	5	7	Kirani James	Grenada	45.00	Q
3	1	4	Tony McQuay	United States	45.06	Q
4	2	5	Anderson Henriques	Brazil	45.13	Q, PB
5	3	8	Deon Lendore	Trinidad and Tobago	45.17	Q
6	5	2	Jarrin Solomon	Trinidad and Tobago	45.19	Q, PB
7	5	8	Javere Bell	Jamaica	45.20	Q
8	4	8	Luguelín Santos	Dominican Republic	45.23	Q
9	1	2	Jonathan Borlée	Belgium	45.24	Q
10	4	7	Kevin Borlée	Belgium	45.32	Q
11	2	7	Javon Francis	Jamaica	45.37	Q
12	2	6	Matteo Galvan	Italy	45.39	Q, PB
12	2	2	Yousef Masrahi	Saudi Arabia	45.39	Q
12	4	5	Chris Brown	Bahamas	45.39	Q
15	4	2	Nigel Levine	Great Britain & N.I.	45.41	Q
16	3	3	Pavel Maslák	Czech Republic	45.44	Q
17	2	3	Arman Hall	United States	45.45	q
18	1	3	Nick Ekelund-Arenander	Denmark	45.50	Q
19	3	5	José Meléndez	Venezuela	45.82	Q, PB
20	5	3	Gustavo Cuesta	Dominican Republic	45.93	Q
21	4	3	Omar Johnson	Jamaica	45.97	q
22	2	4	Brian Gregan	Ireland	46.04	q
23	1	5	Nery Brenes	Costa Rica	46.16	Q
24	4	4	Yuzo Kanemaru	Japan	46.18	q
25	3	7	Vladimir Krasnov	Russia	46.23	
26	5	4	Wayde van Niekerk	South Africa	46.37	
27	3	4	LaToy Williams	Bahamas	46.65	
28	5	5	Kevin Moore	Malta	47.52	
29	1	6	Ramon Miller	Bahamas	47.53	
30	5	6	Angelo Garland	Turks and Caicos Islands	48.65	
31	3	2	Ak Hafiy Tajuddin Rositi	Brunei	49.98	
32	2	8	Hamdinou Cheikh El Wely	Mauritania	52.33	PB
	1	7	Yoandys Lescay	Cuba	DQ	R 163.3
	4	6	Daniel Aleman	Nicaragua	DQ	R 163.3
	1	8	Zaw Win Thet	Myanmar	DQ	R 163.3

=== Semifinals ===
Qualification: First 2 in each heat (Q) and the next 2 fastest (q) advanced to the final.

Rank	Heat	Lane	Name	Nationality	Time	Notes
1	2	6	LaShawn Merritt	United States	44.60	Q
2	1	8	Yousef Masrahi	Saudi Arabia	44.61	Q, NR
3	1	3	Tony McQuay	United States	44.66	Q
4	3	4	Kirani James	Grenada	44.81	Q
5	3	6	Luguelín Santos	Dominican Republic	44.83	Q
6	3	7	Pavel Maslák	Czech Republic	44.84	q, NR
7	2	3	Jonathan Borlée	Belgium	44.85	Q
8	1	5	Anderson Henriques	Brazil	44.95	q, PB
9	1	4	Kevin Borlée	Belgium	45.03	
10	2	8	Chris Brown	Bahamas	45.18	SB
11	3	5	Jarrin Solomon	Trinidad and Tobago	45.43	
12	2	4	Deon Lendore	Trinidad and Tobago	45.47	
13	3	2	Arman Hall	United States	45.54	
14	3	8	Nigel Levine	Great Britain & N.I.	45.60	
15	1	6	Javon Francis	Jamaica	45.62	
16	2	5	Matteo Galvan	Italy	45.69	
17	3	3	Javere Bell	Jamaica	45.77	
18	1	7	Nick Ekelund-Arenander	Denmark	45.89	
19	2	1	Omar Johnson	Jamaica	45.89	
20	2	2	Gustavo Cuesta	Dominican Republic	45.93	
21	1	2	Brian Gregan	Ireland	45.98	
22	2	7	José Meléndez	Venezuela	46.22	
23	1	1	Yuzo Kanemaru	Japan	46.28	
24	3	1	Nery Brenes	Costa Rica	46.34	

=== Final ===
The final was held at 21:50.

Rank	Lane	Name	Nationality	Time	Notes
1st place, gold medalist(s)	6	LaShawn Merritt	United States	43.74	PB, WL
2nd place, silver medalist(s)	4	Tony McQuay	United States	44.40	PB
3rd place, bronze medalist(s)	7	Luguelín Santos	Dominican Republic	44.52	SB
4	8	Jonathan Borlée	Belgium	44.54	SB
5	1	Pavel Maslák	Czech Republic	44.91	
6	3	Yousef Masrahi	Saudi Arabia	44.97	
7	5	Kirani James	Grenada	44.99	
8	2	Anderson Henriques	Brazil	45.03	
