= Sergey Petukhov =

Sergey Petukhov may refer to:

- Sergei Petukhov (choreographer), Russian choreographer mostly working with figure skaters, including Ilia Tkachenko
- Sergey Petukhov (sprinter) Russian athlete
- Sergey Petukhov (engineer)(1842—1912), Russian engineer
