= 2013 World Championships in Athletics – Men's shot put =

Men's shot put at the 2013 World Championships
- Venue: Luzhniki Stadium
- Dates: 15 August (qualification); 16 August (final)
- Competitors: 28 from 18 nations
- Winning distance: 21.73 m (71 ft 3 1/2 in)

Medalists
| gold medal | David Storl; Germany |
| silver medal | Ryan Whiting; United States |
| bronze medal | Dylan Armstrong; Canada |

The men's shot put at the 2013 World Championships in Athletics was held at the Luzhniki Stadium on 15–16 August.

== Records ==
Prior to the competition, the established records were as follows.

| World record | Randy Barnes (USA) | 23.12 | Westwood, United States | 20 May 1990 |
| Championship record | Werner Günthör (SUI) | 22.23 | Rome, Italy | 29 August 1987 |
| World Leading | Ryan Whiting (USA) | 22.28 | Doha, Qatar | 10 May 2013 |
| African record | Janus Robberts (RSA) | 21.97 | Eugene, United States | 2 June 2001 |
| Asian record | Sultan Abdulmajeed Al-Hebshi (KSA) | 21.13 | Doha, Qatar | 8 May 2009 |
| North, Central American and Caribbean record | Randy Barnes (USA) | 23.12 | Westwood, United States | 20 May 1990 |
| South American record | Germán Lauro (ARG) | 21.26 | Doha, Qatar | 10 May 2013 |
| European record | Ulf Timmermann (GDR) | 23.06 | Chania, Greece | 22 May 1988 |
| Oceanian record | Scott Martin (AUS) | 21.26 | Melbourne, Australia | 21 February 2008 |

== Qualification standards ==
| A result | B result |
|---|---|
| 20.60 | 20.10 |

== Schedule ==
| Date | Time | Round |
|---|---|---|
| 15 August 2013 | 10:20 | Qualification |
| 16 August 2013 | 20:10 | Final |

All times are local times (UTC+4)

== Results ==
| KEY: | Q | Qualified | q | 12 best performers | NR | National record | PB | Personal best | SB | Seasonal best |

=== Qualification ===
Qualification: Qualifying performance 20.65 (Q) or at least 12 best performers (q).

| Rank | Group | Athlete | Nationality | No. 1 | No. 2 | No. 3 | Result | Notes |
|---|---|---|---|---|---|---|---|---|
| 1 | B | Ryan Whiting | United States | 21.51 | | | 21.51 | Q |
| 2 | A | Ladislav Prášil | Czech Republic | 20.90 | | | 20.90 | Q |
| 3 | B | Tomasz Majewski | Poland | 20.02 | 20.76 | | 20.76 | Q |
| 4 | B | David Storl | Germany | 20.29 | 20.22 | 20.71 | 20.71 | Q |
| 5 | A | Reese Hoffa | United States | 20.33 | 20.24 | 20.42 | 20.42 | q |
| 6 | A | Georgi Ivanov | Bulgaria | x | 20.40 | 19.97 | 20.40 | q |
| 7 | B | Dylan Armstrong | Canada | 19.95 | 20.39 | 20.35 | 20.39 | q |
| 8 | B | Cory Martin | United States | 20.18 | 19.89 | 20.18 | 20.18 | q |
| 9 | B | Germán Lauro | Argentina | 20.09 | 20.07 | 19.88 | 20.09 | q |
| 10 | A | Asmir Kolašinac | Serbia | x | 19.74 | 20.07 | 20.07 | q |
| 11 | B | Martin Stašek | Czech Republic | 19.60 | 19.80 | 20.04 | 20.04 | q |
| 12 | A | Antonín Žalský | Czech Republic | 19.59 | 19.28 | 19.76 | 19.76 | q |
| 13 | A | Maksim Sidorov | Russia | 19.34 | 19.63 | x | 19.63 | |
| 14 | B | Leif Arrhenius | Sweden | 19.27 | 19.08 | 19.53 | 19.53 | |
| 15 | A | Orazio Cremona | South Africa | 19.39 | 19.42 | 19.23 | 19.42 | |
| 16 | A | Marco Fortes | Portugal | 19.38 | 19.19 | x | 19.38 | |
| 17 | A | Jakub Szyszkowski | Poland | 19.36 | 19.26 | x | 19.36 | |
| 18 | B | Sultan Al-Hebshi | Saudi Arabia | 18.80 | 19.22 | 17.88 | 19.22 | |
| 19 | B | Hamza Alić | Bosnia and Herzegovina | 19.18 | x | x | 19.18 | |
| 20 | A | O'Dayne Richards | Jamaica | 19.08 | 18.89 | 18.86 | 19.08 | |
| 21 | B | Aleksandr Lesnoy | Russia | 19.01 | x | x | 19.01 | |
| 22 | A | Kemal Mešić | Bosnia and Herzegovina | 18.98 | x | x | 18.98 | |
| 23 | B | Borja Vivas | Spain | x | 18.95 | 18.97 | 18.97 | |
| 24 | A | Tim Nedow | Canada | x | 18.72 | 18.52 | 18.72 | |
| 25 | A | Marin Premeru | Croatia | x | 18.71 | x | 18.71 | |
| 26 | A | Zach Loyd | United States | 18.40 | x | 18.63 | 18.63 | |
| 27 | B | Soslan Tsirikhov | Russia | 18.53 | x | 18.41 | 18.53 | |
| | B | Pavel Lyzhyn | Belarus | x | x | x | NM | |
| | B | Raymond Brown | Jamaica | | | | DNS | |

=== Final ===
The final was started at 20:10.

| Rank | Athlete | Nationality | No. 1 | No. 2 | No. 3 | No. 4 | No. 5 | No. 6 | Result | Notes |
|---|---|---|---|---|---|---|---|---|---|---|
| 1st place, gold medalist(s) | David Storl | Germany | 21.19 | 21.24 | x | 21.73 | x | x | 21.73 | SB |
| 2nd place, silver medalist(s) | Ryan Whiting | United States | 21.57 | x | 21.35 | 21.20 | x | 21.22 | 21.57 | |
| 3rd place, bronze medalist(s) | Dylan Armstrong | Canada | 20.38 | 21.10 | 20.73 | 20.87 | 21.34 | 20.46 | 21.34 | SB |
| 4 | Reese Hoffa | United States | 20.59 | 21.12 | x | 20.72 | 20.64 | x | 21.12 | |
| 5 | Ladislav Prášil | Czech Republic | 20.60 | 20.98 | 20.89 | 20.76 | 20.83 | 20.93 | 20.98 | |
| 6 | Tomasz Majewski | Poland | 20.46 | 20.89 | x | 20.91 | 20.98 | x | 20.98 | SB |
| 7 | Germán Lauro | Argentina | 19.69 | 20.26 | 19.23 | 20.40 | 19.30 | 20.06 | 20.40 | |
| 8 | Georgi Ivanov | Bulgaria | 20.29 | x | 20.39 | x | 20.19 | x | 20.39 | |
| 9 | Cory Martin | United States | 20.09 | x | 20.06 | | | | 20.09 | |
| 10 | Asmir Kolašinac | Serbia | 19.96 | 19.78 | x | | | | 19.96 | |
| 11 | Antonín Žalský | Czech Republic | 19.54 | x | x | | | | 19.54 | |
| 12 | Martin Stašek | Czech Republic | 19.10 | x | x | | | | 19.10 | |
