= 2013 World Championships in Athletics – Women's 400 metres =

Women's 400 metres at the 2013 World Championships
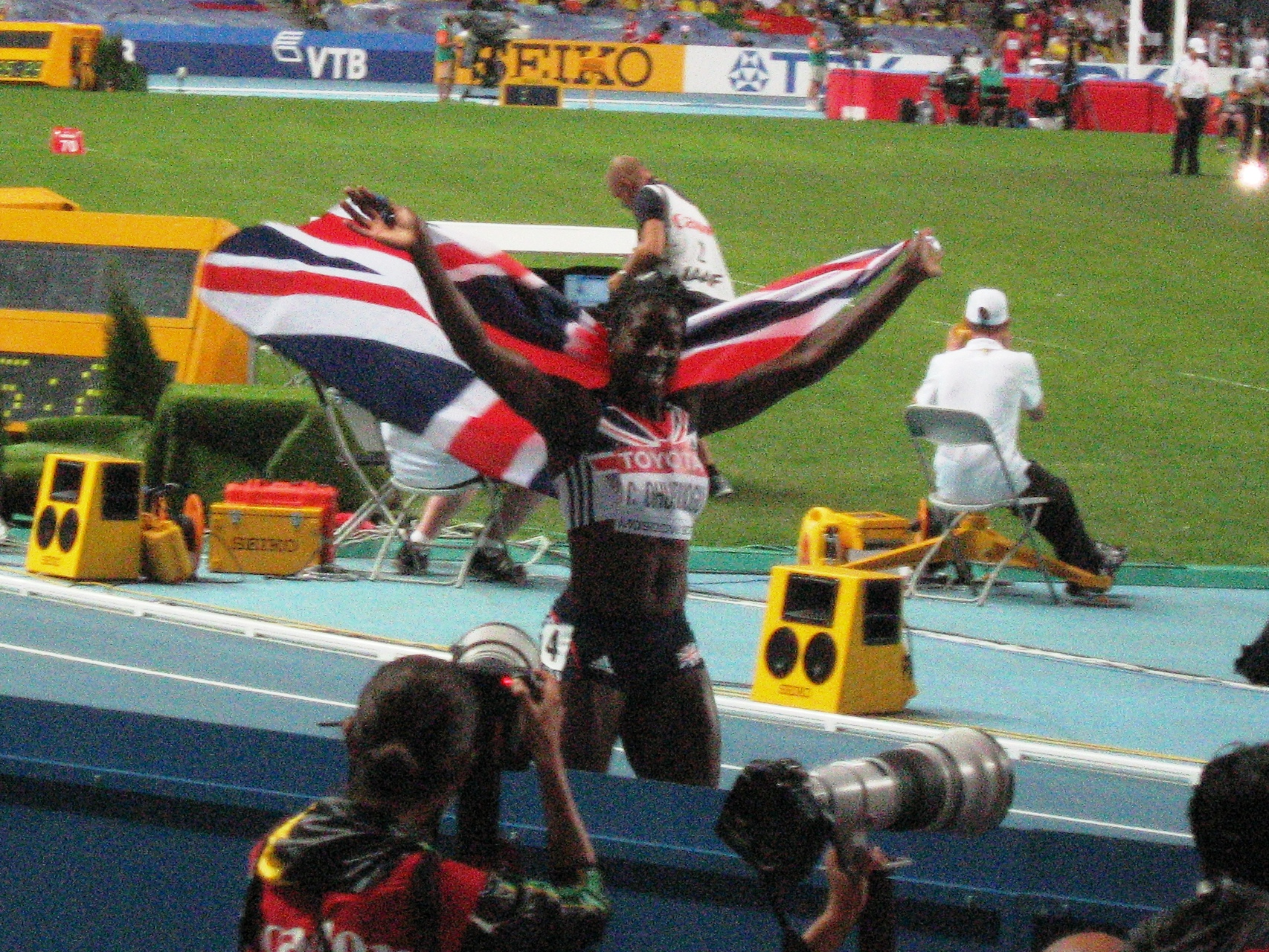
- Gold medalist Christine Ohuruogu
- Venue: Luzhniki Stadium
- Dates: 10 August (heats); 11 August (semifinals); 12 August (final)
- Competitors: 36 from 28 nations
- Winning time: 49.41

Medalists
gold medal	Christine Ohuruogu; Great Britain & N.I.
silver medal	Amantle Montsho; Botswana
bronze medal	Stephanie McPherson; Jamaica

The women's 400 metres at the 2013 World Championships in Athletics was held at the Luzhniki Stadium on 10–12 August.

Heats started with Christine Ohuruogu leading 6 others under 51 with an exceptionally fast 50.20. 50 seconds was the order of the semifinal day. Six finalists dipped under 50, and Kseniya Ryzhova was lucky Amantle Montsho had gapped the first semi with the leading qualifier of 49.56. Ryzhova cruised in with a 50.48 to be the second automatic qualifier. Five others ran personal bests attempting to qualify.

The fast semifinals slowed the majority of the field. Only the medalists improved their times. From the gun Natasha Hastings and defending champion Amantle Montsho took it out, Hastings in lane 3 making up the stagger on Christine Ohuruogu in 4. Francena McCorory held her own and came off the final turn with Montsho but as Montsho aimed at the finish, the others went backward. With 50 metres to go, Christine Ohuruogu had worked her way from several metres down in the turn and had pulled even, looking like a good bet for silver. But she had other ideas. A steady stretch run put both a diving Ohuruogu and Montsho on the line at the same time. And that was what was posted 49.41, the same time for both. It took a look at the photo finish to determine that Ohuruogu had won by 4 thousandths of a second. Running a more even pace Russian Antonina Krivoshapka came off the turn even with Ohuruogu and made a stretch run of her own, overtaking the Americans and Stephanie McPherson to get a bronze medal that she later lost following a doping violation.

In the process of running a personal best to win the championship, Ohuruogu also got Kathy Smallwood-Cook's 29-year-old British national record (from the 1984 Olympics) that had so far evaded her through her career, a career that had included two Olympic medals, including the gold in 2008, and a previous World Championship.

== Records ==
Prior to the competition, the records were as follows:

World record	Marita Koch (GDR)	47.60	Canberra, Australia	6 October 1985
Championship record	Jarmila Kratochvílová (TCH)	47.99	Helsinki, Finland	10 August 1983
World Leading	Amantle Montsho (BOT)	49.33	Monaco	19 July 2013
African Record	Falilat Ogunkoya (NGR)	49.10	Atlanta, GA, United States	29 July 1996
Asian Record	Ma Yuqin (CHN)	49.81	Beijing, China	11 September 1993
North, Central American and Caribbean record	Sanya Richards-Ross (USA)	48.70	Athens, Greece	16 September 2006
South American record	Ximena Restrepo (COL)	49.64	Barcelona, Spain	5 August 1992
European Record	Marita Koch (GDR)	47.60	Canberra, Australia	6 October 1985
Oceanian record	Cathy Freeman (AUS)	48.63	Atlanta, GA, United States	29 July 1996

== Qualification standards ==
A time	B time
51.55	52.35

== Schedule ==
Date	Time	Round
10 August 2013	18:05	Heats
11 August 2013	20:05	Semifinals
12 August 2013	21:15	Final

All times are local times (UTC+4)

== Results ==
KEY:	Q	Qualified	q	Fastest non-qualifiers	NR	National record	PB	Personal best	SB	Seasonal best

=== Heats ===
Qualification: First 4 in each heat (Q) and the next 4 fastest (q) advanced to the semifinals.

Rank	Heat	Lane	Name	Nationality	Time	Notes
1	2	6	Christine Ohuruogu	Great Britain & N.I.	50.20	Q
2	3	7	Francena McCorory	United States	50.56	Q
3	2	3	Natasha Hastings	United States	50.64	Q
4	4	5	Kseniya Ryzhova	Russia	50.69	Q
5	5	5	Amantle Montsho	Botswana	50.75	Q
6	4	2	Novlene Williams-Mills	Jamaica	50.83	Q
7	3	4	Stephanie McPherson	Jamaica	50.98	Q
8	5	2	Regina George	Nigeria	51.01	Q
9	4	3	Nataliya Pyhyda	Ukraine	51.17	Q, SB
10	1	3	Antonina Krivoshapka	Russia	51.27	Q
11	3	2	Libania Grenot	Italy	51.43	Q, SB
12	1	5	Ashley Spencer	United States	51.48	Q
13	4	6	Bianca Răzor	Romania	51.51	Q, PB
14	1	4	Kineke Alexander	Saint Vincent and the Grenadines	51.62	Q, SB
15	3	8	Floria Gueï	France	51.75	Q
16	2	1	Marie Gayot	France	51.83	Q
17	1	6	Omolara Omotoso	Nigeria	51.98	Q
18	4	4	Tjipekapora Herunga	Namibia	52.01	q, SB
19	4	8	Chiara Bazzoni	Italy	52.14	q
20	4	7	Esther Cremer	Germany	52.17	q
21	5	6	Patricia Hall	Jamaica	52.20	Q
22	2	2	Amy Mbacké Thiam	Senegal	52.24	Q
23	1	8	Agne Šerkšnienė	Lithuania	52.28	q, PB
24	2	4	Moa Hjelmer	Sweden	52.39	
25	5	7	Aauri Bokesa	Spain	52.44	Q
26	1	7	Olesea Cojuhari	Moldova	52.45	
27	5	4	Jennifer Carey	Ireland	52.62	
28	5	8	Caitlin Sargent	Australia	52.63	
29	2	8	Joelma Sousa	Brazil	53.01	
30	3	5	Alicia Brown	Canada	53.26	
31	1	2	Kadecia Baird	Guyana	53.73	
32	3	6	Zhao Yanmin	China	54.03	
33	2	7	Gretta Taslakian	Lebanon	54.56	
34	3	3	Sade Sealy	Barbados	55.45	
35	2	5	Phumlile Ndzinisa	Swaziland	56.36	
	5	3	Maureen Jelagat Maiyo	Kenya	DQ	163.3

=== Semifinals ===
Qualification: First 2 in each heat (Q) and the next 2 fastest (q) advanced to the final.

Rank	Heat	Lane	Name	Nationality	Time	Notes
1	1	5	Amantle Montsho	Botswana	49.56	Q
2	2	4	Christine Ohuruogu	Great Britain & N.I.	49.75	Q, SB
3	3	5	Francena McCorory	United States	49.86	Q, PB
4	2	5	Natasha Hastings	United States	49.94	Q, SB
5	3	4	Antonina Krivoshapka	Russia	49.99	Q
5	3	3	Stephanie McPherson	Jamaica	49.99	q
7	2	6	Novlene Williams-Mills	Jamaica	50.34	q
8	2	3	Libania Grenot	Italy	50.47	SB
9	1	3	Kseniya Ryzhova	Russia	50.48	Q
10	1	6	Regina George	Nigeria	50.84	PB
11	3	6	Nataliya Pyhyda	Ukraine	51.02	PB
12	2	7	Floria Gueï	France	51.42	PB
13	1	7	Bianca Răzor	Romania	51.49	PB
14	3	7	Marie Gayot	France	51.54	PB
15	2	8	Kineke Alexander	Saint Vincent and the Grenadines	51.64	
16	1	4	Ashley Spencer	United States	51.80	
17	3	1	Aauri Bokesa	Spain	51.94	
18	1	2	Chiara Bazzoni	Italy	52.11	
19	1	1	Tjipekapora Herunga	Namibia	52.28	
20	2	1	Amy Mbacké Thiam	Senegal	52.37	
21	3	8	Omolara Omotoso	Nigeria	52.38	
22	3	2	Esther Cremer	Germany	52.42	
23	2	2	Agne Šerkšnienė	Lithuania	52.48	
24	1	8	Patricia Hall	Jamaica	52.62	

=== Final ===
The final was held at 21:15.

Rank	Lane	Name	Nationality	Time	Notes
1st place, gold medalist(s)	4	Christine Ohuruogu	Great Britain & N.I.	49.41	NR
2nd place, silver medalist(s)	5	Amantle Montsho	Botswana	49.41	
3rd place, bronze medalist(s)	2	Stephanie McPherson	Jamaica	49.99	
4	3	Natasha Hastings	United States	50.30	
5	6	Francena McCorory	United States	50.68	
6	7	Kseniya Ryzhova	Russia	50.98	
7	1	Novlene Williams-Mills	Jamaica	51.49	
DQ	8	Antonina Krivoshapka	Russia	49.78	
