= James Harris (sprinter) =

American sprinter (born 1991)

Personal information
- Nationality: American
- Born: September 18, 1991 (age 34)

Sport
- Sport: Running
- Event: 400 metres
Medal record
World Championships
| Gold medal – first place | 2013 Moscow | 4 × 400 m relay |
NACAC Championships
| Gold medal – first place | 2015 Costa Rica | 4 × 400 m relay |

James Harris (born September 18, 1991) is an American sprinter who specialises in the 400 metres. He was part of the US team that won gold in the 4 × 400 m relay at the 2013 World Championships in Athletics.

In addition to being a sprinter, Harris was also an accomplished high jumper. Competing for the Florida State Seminoles track and field team, Harris won the 2014 high jump at the NCAA Division I Indoor Track and Field Championships with a mark of 2.32 meters. Harris also competed for the Mississippi State Bulldogs track and field team.
