= Lev Mosin =

Russian sprinter

Personal information
- Nationality: Russian
- Born: 7 December 1992 (age 33) Russia

Sport
- Sport: Track and field
- Event: 400m
Medal record
Men's athletics
Representing Russia
World Championships
Disqualified	2013 Moscow	4×400 m relay

Lev Mosin (born 7 December 1992) is a Russian sprinter. He competed in the 4x400 metres relay event at the 2013 World Championships in Athletics.
