= Botswana at the 2013 World Championships in Athletics =

- WA code: BOT
- National federation: Botswana Athletics Association

in Moscow
- Competitors: 11
- Medals: Gold 0 Silver 1 Bronze 0 Total 1

World Championships in Athletics appearances
- 1983; 1987; 1991; 1993; 1995; 1997; 1999; 2001; 2003; 2005; 2007; 2009; 2011; 2013; 2015; 2017; 2019; 2022; 2023; 2025

Botswana competed at the 2013 World Championships in Athletics in Moscow, Russia, from 10 to 18 August 2013. A team of 11 athletes was announced to represent the country in the event.

== Medallists ==
The following Botswana competitors won medals at the Championships

Medal	Name	Event	Date
Silver	Amantle Montsho	400 metres	12 August

== Results ==
(q – qualified, NM – no mark, SB – season best)

=== Men ===
Track and road events

Athlete	Event	Preliminaries		Heats		Semifinals		Final	
Athlete	Event	Time	Rank	Time	Rank	Time	Rank	Time	Rank
Isaac Makwala	200 metres			20.84	20	did not advance			
Nijel Amos	800 metres			DNS	NM	did not advance			
Nijel Amos; Thapelo Ketlogetswe; Obakeng Ngwigwa; Pako Seribe; Isaac Makwala	4 × 400 metres relay			3:05.74	22			did not advance	

Field events

Athlete	Event	Preliminaries		Final	
Athlete	Event	Width Height	Rank	Width Height	Rank
Kabelo Kgosiemang	High jump	2.26	11 q	2.25	10

=== Women ===
Athlete	Event	Preliminaries		Heats		Semifinals		Final	
Athlete	Event	Time	Rank	Time	Rank	Time	Rank	Time	Rank
Amantle Montsho	400 metres			50.75	5 Q	49.56	1 Q	49.41	2nd place, silver medalist(s)
Oarabile Babolayi; Christine Botlogetswe; Lydia Mashila; Amantle Montsho; Goitseone Seleka	4 × 400 metres relay			3:38.96	16			did not advance	
