= Czech Republic at the 2013 World Championships in Athletics =

- WA code: CZE
- National federation: Český atletický svaz

in Moscow
- Competitors: 28
- Medals: Gold 2 Silver 0 Bronze 1 Total 3

World Championships in Athletics appearances
- 1993; 1995; 1997; 1999; 2001; 2003; 2005; 2007; 2009; 2011; 2013; 2015; 2017; 2019; 2022; 2023; 2025

Czech Republic is competing at the 2013 World Championships in Athletics in Moscow, Russia, from 10–18 August 2013.

== Team selection ==
The Czech athletic federation is sending a 28-member strong team (14 women and 14 men) into the event including world season leader Zuzana Hejnová (400m Hurdles) and European indoor medalist from Gothenburg Pavel Maslák (400m).

== Medalists ==
The following competitors from the Czech Republic won medals at the Championships

Medal	Athlete	Event	Date
Bronze	Lukáš Melich	Hammer throw	13 August
Gold	Zuzana Hejnová	400 m hurdles	15 August
Gold	Vítězslav Veselý	Jevelin throw	17 August

== Results ==
(Q, q – qualified, NM – no mark, SB – season best)

=== Men ===
Athlete	Event	Preliminaries		Heats		Semifinals		Final	
Athlete	Event	Time Width Height	Rank	Time Width Height	Rank	Time Width Height	Rank	Time Width Height	Rank
Pavel Maslák	400 metres			45.44	16 Q	44.84	6 Q	44.91	5
Jan Kubista	800 metres			1:47.66	25	Did not advance			
Martin Mazáč	110 metres hurdles			13.52	17	Did not advance			
Daniel Němeček; Pavel Maslák; Petr Lichý; Jan Tesař; Jan Kubista	4 x 400 metres relay			3:04.54	19			Did not advance	
Jaroslav Bába	High jump	2.26	14					Did not advance	
Michal Balner	Pole vault	NM	–					Did not advance	
Jan Kudlička	Pole vault	5.65	1 q					5.75	7
Lukáš Melich	Hammer throw	78.52	2 Q					79.36	3rd place, bronze medalist(s)
Ladislav Prášil	Shot put	20.90	2 Q					20.98	5
Martin Stašek	Shot put	20.04	11 q					19.10	12
Antonín Žalský	Shot put	19.76	12 q					19.54	11
Vítězslav Veselý	Javelin throw	81.51	5 q					87.17	1st place, gold medalist(s)

=== Women ===
Athlete	Event	Preliminaries		Heats		Semifinals		Final	
Athlete	Event	Time Width Height	Rank	Time Width Height	Rank	Time Width Height	Rank	Time Width Height	Rank
Kateřina Čechová	100 metres			11.67	34	Did not advance			
Lenka Masná	800 m			2:00.31	13 q	1:59,56 (PB)	5	2:00.59	8
Lucie Škrobáková	100 m hurdles			13.24	24	did not advance			
Zuzana Hejnová	400 m hurdles			55.25	5	53.52	1 Q	52.83	1st place, gold medalist(s)
Denisa Rosolová	400 m hurdles			55.44	8	55.14	11	Did not advance	
Denisa Rosolová; Jitka Bartoničková; Jana Slaninová; Zuzana Hejnová; Lenka Masná; Sylva Škabrahová	4 x 400 metres relay			3:30.48	10			did not advance	
Anežka Drahotová	20 kilometres walk							1:29:05 PB	7
Lucie Pelantová	20 kilometres walk							1:40:23	57
Jana Korešová	Long jump	6.18	25					Did not advance	
Jiřina Svobodová	Pole vault	4.55	1 q					4.55	8
Tereza Králová	Hammer throw	64.74	24					Did not advance	

Heptathlon

	Heptathlon			
	Event	Results	Points	Rank
Eliška Klučinová	100 m hurdles	13.97	983	23
Eliška Klučinová	High jump	1.86	1 054	4
Eliška Klučinová	Shot put	14.19	807	5
Eliška Klučinová	200 m	24.91	895	15
Eliška Klučinová	Long jump	6.12	887	11
Eliška Klučinová	Javelin throw	45.76	778	9
Eliška Klučinová	800 m	2:12.50	928	10
Total			6332	7

- Athletes in italics did not race.
