= 2013 World Championships in Athletics – Women's 400 metres hurdles =

Women's 400 metres hurdles at the 2013 World Championships in Athletics
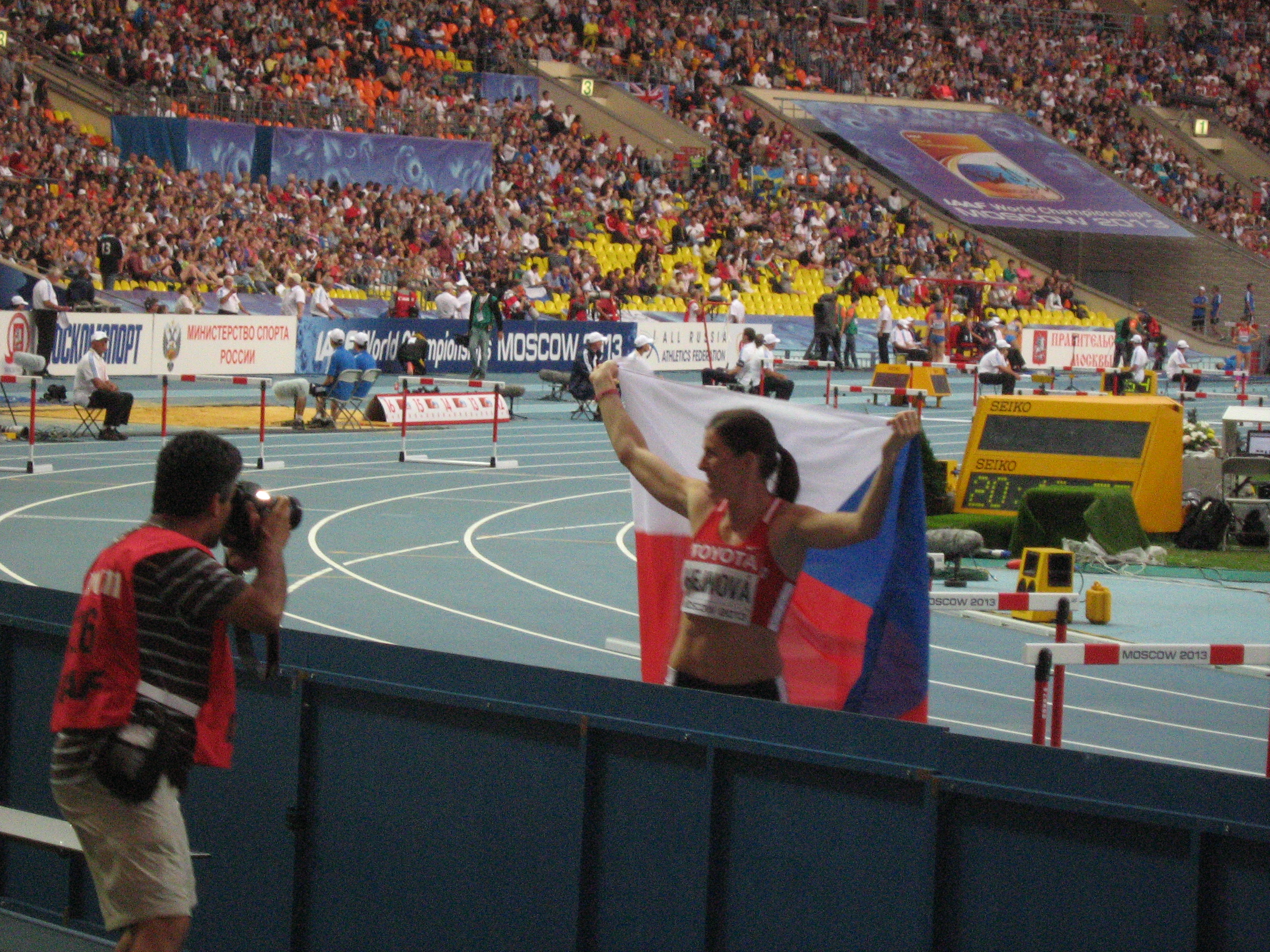
- Gold medalist Zuzana Hejnová
- Venue: Luzhniki Stadium
- Location: Moscow, Russia
- Dates: 12 August 2013 (heats); 13 August 2013 (semifinals); 15 August 2013 (final)
- Competitors: 32 from 19 nations
- Winning time: 52.83 s NR

Medalists
gold medal	Zuzana Hejnová	Czech Republic
silver medal	Dalilah Muhammad	United States
bronze medal	Lashinda Demus	United States

The women's 400 metres hurdles at the 2013 World Championships in Athletics was held at the Luzhniki Stadium on 12–15 August.

== Records ==
Prior to the competition, the records were as follows:

World record	Yuliya Pechonkina (RUS)	52.34	Tula, Russia	8 August 2003
Championship record	Melaine Walker (JAM)	52.42	Berlin, Germany	20 August 2009
World Leading	Zuzana Hejnová (CZE)	53.07	London, United Kingdom	26 July 2013
African Record	Nezha Bidouane (MAR)	52.90	Seville, Spain	25 August 1999
Asian Record	Qing Han (CHN)	53.96	Beijing, People's Republic of China	9 September 1993
North, Central American and Caribbean record	Melaine Walker (JAM)	52.42	Berlin, Germany	20 August 2009
South American Record	Lucimar Teodoro (BRA)	55.84	Belém, Brazil	24 May 2009
European Record	Yuliya Pechonkina (RUS)	52.34	Tula, Russia	8 August 2003
Oceanian record	Debbie Flintoff-King (AUS)	53.17	Seoul, South Korea	27 September 1988

== Qualification standards ==
A time	B time
55.40	56.55

== Schedule ==
Date	Time	Round
12 August 2013	11:50	Heats
13 August 2013	19:05	Semifinals
15 August 2013	21:45	Final

All times are local times (UTC+4)

== Results ==
KEY:	q	Fastest non-qualifiers	Q	Qualified	NR	National record	PB	Personal best	SB	Seasonal best

=== Heats ===
Qualification: First 3 in each heat (Q) and the next 4 fastest (q) advanced to the semifinals.

Rank	Heat	Lane	Name	Nationality	Time	Notes
1	3	2	Perri Shakes-Drayton	Great Britain & N.I.	54.42	Q
2	4	5	Dalilah Muhammad	United States	54.90	Q
3	3	3	Lashinda Demus	United States	54.94	Q
4	4	1	Eilidh Child	Great Britain & N.I.	55.17	Q
5	2	8	Zuzana Hejnová	Czech Republic	55.25	Q
6	3	1	Natalya Antyukh	Russia	55.29	Q
7	3	4	Lauren Boden	Australia	55.37	q
8	1	2	Denisa Rosolová	Czech Republic	55.44	Q
9	1	8	Meghan Beesley	Great Britain & N.I.	55.45	Q
9	4	7	Irina Davydova	Russia	55.45	Q
11	2	5	Hanna Titimets	Ukraine	55.50	Q
12	4	4	Hanna Yaroshchuk	Ukraine	55.73	q
13	2	7	Nickiesha Wilson	Jamaica	55.75	Q
14	1	1	Vania Stambolova	Bulgaria	55.91	Q
15	3	6	Ristananna Tracey	Jamaica	55.94	q
16	2	6	Christine Spence	United States	55.96	q
17	1	7	Satomi Kubokura	Japan	56.33	SB
18	2	3	Anastasiya Ott	Russia	56.39	
19	4	3	Jennifer Rockwell-Grossarth	Italy	56.53	
20	3	7	Phara Anacharsis	France	56.73	
21	1	5	Axelle Dauwens	Belgium	56.85	
22	4	6	Danielle Dowie	Jamaica	57.03	
23	4	8	Ugonna Ndu	Nigeria	57.27	
24	4	2	Noelle Montcalm	Canada	57.50	
25	2	4	Anneri Ebersohn	South Africa	57.90	
26	2	2	Amaliya Sharoyan	Armenia	57.97	NR
27	1	3	Hayat Lambarki	Morocco	58.00	
28	3	8	Sparkle McKnight	Trinidad and Tobago	58.85	
29	1	4	Georganne Moline	United States	59.05	
	1	6	Kaliese Spencer	Jamaica	DQ	
	2	1	Muizat Ajoke Odumosu	Nigeria	DQ	
	3	5	Christine Sonali Merrill	Sri Lanka	DQ	

=== Semifinals ===
Qualification: First 3 in each heat (Q) and the next 2 fastest (q) advanced to the final.

Rank	Heat	Lane	Name	Nationality	Time	Notes
1	1	4	Zuzana Hejnová	Czech Republic	53.52	Q
2	2	5	Perri Shakes-Drayton	Great Britain & N.I.	53.92	Q
3	1	5	Dalilah Muhammad	United States	54.08	Q
4	2	4	Lashinda Demus	United States	54.22	Q, SB
5	1	6	Eilidh Child	Great Britain & N.I.	54.32	Q
6	2	3	Hanna Titimets	Ukraine	54.63	Q, PB
7	1	1	Hanna Yaroshchuk	Ukraine	54.92	q
8	1	7	Nickiesha Wilson	Jamaica	54.94	q, SB
9	1	3	Meghan Beesley	Great Britain & N.I.	54.97	PB
10	1	8	Irina Davydova	Russia	55.05	
11	2	6	Denisa Rosolová	Czech Republic	55.14	
12	2	2	Ristananna Tracey	Jamaica	55.43	
13	2	8	Natalya Antyukh	Russia	55.55	
14	2	1	Lauren Boden	Australia	55.75	
15	2	7	Vania Stambolova	Bulgaria	56.58	
16	1	2	Christine Spence	United States	58.35	

=== Final ===
The final was started at 20:45.

Rank	Lane	Name	Nationality	Time	Notes
1st place, gold medalist(s)	3	Zuzana Hejnová	Czech Republic	52.83	WL, NR
2nd place, silver medalist(s)	4	Dalilah Muhammad	United States	54.09	
3rd place, bronze medalist(s)	6	Lashinda Demus	United States	54.27	
4	7	Hanna Titimets	Ukraine	54.72	
5	8	Eilidh Child	Great Britain & N.I.	54.86	
6	1	Hanna Yaroshchuk	Ukraine	55.01	
7	5	Perri Shakes-Drayton	Great Britain & N.I.	56.25	
8	2	Nickiesha Wilson	Jamaica	57.34	
