= Portugal at the 2013 World Championships in Athletics =

- WA code: POR
- National federation: Federação Portuguesa de Atletismo
- Website: www.fpatletismo.pt

in Moscow
- Competitors: 12
- Medals: Gold 0 Silver 0 Bronze 1 Total 1

World Championships in Athletics appearances
- 1980; 1983; 1987; 1991; 1993; 1995; 1997; 1999; 2001; 2003; 2005; 2007; 2009; 2011; 2013; 2015; 2017; 2019; 2022; 2023; 2025

Portugal competed at the 2013 World Championships in Athletics in Moscow, Russia, from 10–18 August 2013. A team of 12 athletes was announced to represent the country in the event.

== Results ==
(q – qualified, NM – no mark, SB – season best)

=== Men ===
Athlete	Event	Preliminaries		Heats		Semifinals		Final	
Athlete	Event	Time Width Height	Rank	Time Width Height	Rank	Time Width Height	Rank	Time Width Height	Rank
Hermano Ferreira	Marathon							DNF	–
Marcos Chuva	Long jump	7.82	16					Did not advance	
Edi Maia	Pole vault	5.40	24					Did not advance	
Marco Fortes	Shot put	19.38	16					did not advance	
Sérgio Vieira	20 kilometres walk							1:28:34	40
João Vieira	20 kilometres walk							1:22:05	3
Pedro Isidro	50 kilometres walk							3:57:30	28

At the 2013 World Championships in Athletics, Portuguese race walker João Vieira initially finished in 4th place in the men’s 20 km race walk event. However, following the annulment of Russian athlete Sergey Ivanov’s results from July 9, 2012, to August 17, 2014, Vieira was awarded the bronze medal for this event, enhancing his legacy in Portuguese athletics. This bronze medal is also the only medal won by Portugal in the competition.

=== Women ===
Athlete	Event	Preliminaries		Heats		Semifinals		Final	
Athlete	Event	Time Width Height	Rank	Time Width Height	Rank	Time Width Height	Rank	Time Width Height	Rank
Ana Dulce Felix	10,000 metres							32:36.73	13
Ana Cabecinha	20 kilometres walk							1:29:17 PB	8
Inês Henriques	20 kilometres walk							1:30:28	11
Vera Santos	20 kilometres walk							1:31:36	17
Irina Rodrigues	Discus throw	57.64	17					Did not advance	

== See also ==
- Portugal at the 2013 World Aquatics Championships
