= Nickiesha Wilson =

Jamaican hurdler

Personal information
- Born: 28 July 1986 (age 39)
- Height: 1.76 m (5 ft 9 1/2 in)
- Weight: 62 kg (137 lb)

Sport
- Country: Jamaica
- Sport: Athletics
- Event: 400m Hurdles
Medal record
Pan American Games
Silver medal – second place	2007 Rio de Janeiro	400 m hurdles
Commonwealth Games
Bronze medal – third place	2010 Dehli	400 m hurdles
CAC Championships
Gold medal – first place	2009 Havana	400m hurdles
Silver medal – second place	2009 Havana	4×400m relay
CAC Games
Gold medal – first place	2010 Mayagüez	400m hurdles
Continental Cup
Gold medal – first place	2010 Split	400 m hurdles
- Updated on 27 January 2015

Nickiesha Wilson (born 28 July 1986 in Kingston) is a hurdler from Jamaica. She competes in the 100 m hurdles and the 400 m hurdles.

Currently her 100 m hurdles personal best is 12.79 achieved at Szczecin, Poland in 2009. She ran a personal best of 53.97 in the 400 m hurdles in Osaka in 2007.

Wilson finished fourth in the 2007 World Championships in the 400 metres hurdles. She competed in the 400 metres hurdles at the 2008 Beijing Olympics where she qualified for the second round with the tenth fastest overall time of 55.75 seconds. In the 2010 Commonwealth Games, she won the bronze medal in 400 m hurdles.

Wilson is the most prolific hurdler in NCAA history. A 17 time college All-American and 3-time NCAA Champion at Louisiana State University (LSU), Wilson is the only hurdler in NCAA history to win the 400 meter hurdles (pr 53.97) and finish runner up in the 100 meter hurdles (pr 12.85) in the same year while also posting a top 5 finish in the indoor 60 meter hurdles (pr 8.01). Wilson led LSU to the outdoor NCAA team title by scoring 18 individual points for the Tigers. In the summer of 2008, Wilson opted to forgo her senior season at LSU to sign a professional contract with Adidas

== Personal bests ==
Event	Result	Venue	Date
Outdoor
200 m	23.98 s (wind: +1.4 m/s)	Auburn, Alabama	16 Apr 2011
400 m	53.61 s	Clemson, South Carolina	14 May 2011
800 m	2:11.37	Gainesville, Florida	5 Apr 2013
100 m hurdles	12.79 s (wind: +0.9 m/s)	Szczecin	15 Sep 2009
400 m hurdles	53.97 s	Osaka	28 Aug 2007
Indoor
200 m	23.59 s	Fayetteville, Arkansas	2 Mar 2008
400 m	53.66 s	Fayetteville, Arkansas	26 Jan 2008
60 m hurdles	7.55 s	Fayetteville, Arkansas	23 Jan 2010

== International competitions ==
Year	Competition	Venue	Position	Event	Notes
Representing Jamaica
2005	CARIFTA Games (U20)	Bacolet, Trinidad and Tobago	2nd	400m hurdles	57.38
2005	Pan American Junior Championships	Windsor, Ontario, Canada	1st	400m hurdles	57.40
2006	NACAC Under-23 Championships	Santo Domingo, Dominican Republic	5th	100m hurdles	13.64 (wind: +0.4 m/s)
2006	NACAC Under-23 Championships	Santo Domingo, Dominican Republic	2nd	400m hurdles	56.77
2007	Pan American Games	Rio de Janeiro, Brazil	2nd	400m hurdles	54.94
2007	World Championships	Osaka, Japan	4th	400m hurdles	54.10
2008	NACAC Under-23 Championships	Toluca, Mexico	1st	400m hurdles	55.78 A
2008	NACAC Under-23 Championships	Toluca, Mexico	1st	4 × 400 m relay	3:27.46 A
2008	Olympic Games	Beijing, China	7th (sf)	400m hurdles	54.67
2009	Central American and Caribbean Championships	Havana, Cuba	1st	400m hurdles	56.95
2009	Central American and Caribbean Championships	Havana, Cuba	2nd	4 × 400 m relay	3:34.02
2009	World Championships	Berlin, Germany	10th (sf)	400m hurdles	54.89
2010	Central American and Caribbean Games	Mayagüez, Puerto Rico	1st	400m hurdles	55.40
2010	Commonwealth Games	Delhi, India	3rd	400m hurdles	56.06
2010	Continental Cup	Split, Croatia	1st	400m hurdles	54.52
2011	World Championships	Daegu, South Korea	19th (sf)	400m hurdles	56.58
2012	Olympic Games	London, United Kingdom	15th (sf)	400m hurdles	55.77
2013	World Championships	Moscow, Russia	8th	400m hurdles	57.34
2014	Pan American Sports Festival	Mexico City, Mexico	3rd	400m hurdles	56.64 A
2016	Olympic Games	Rio de Janeiro, Brazil	19th (sf)	100 m hurdles	13.14
