= 2013 World Championships in Athletics =

Athletics competition in Moscow, Russia

14th IAAF World Championships in Athletics
- Nations: 203
- Athletes: 1,784
- Events: 47
- Dates: 10–18 August 2013
- Opened by: President Vladimir Putin
- Closed by: IAAF President Lamine Diack
- Main venue: Luzhniki Stadium

The 14th IAAF World Championships in Athletics (Moscow 2013; Russian: Чемпионат мира по лёгкой атлетике 2013) was an international athletics competition held in Moscow, Russia, from 10 to 18 August 2013.

Initially, Russia won the most gold medals to top the table for the first time since 2001. It was also the first time ever the host nation took the top of the medal table. However, following the disqualification of Russian sprinter Antonina Krivoshapka for doping and after the redistribution of medals in the Women's 4 × 400 metres relay (as well as after series of other disqualifications of Russian athletes for doping offences), the United States moved to the top of the medal table with eight golds. In the overall medal count, the United States won 26 medals in total, followed by Kenya with 12. With 1,784 athletes from 203 countries it was the biggest single sports event of the year. The number of spectators for the evening sessions was 268,548 surpassing Daegu 2011.

Jamaica's Usain Bolt and Shelly-Ann Fraser-Pryce both won three gold medals in the men's and women's 100 metres, 200 metres and 4 × 100 metres relay respectively to become the most successful athletes at the event. This achievement also earned Bolt the title of being the most successful athlete in the history of the World Championships with eight gold and two silver medals. Prior to the competition, four sprinters were banned on doping charges.

== Bidding process ==
When the seeking deadline passed on 1 December 2006, four candidate cities had confirmed their candidatures. These were: Barcelona (Spain), Brisbane (Australia), Moscow (Russia) and Gothenburg (Sweden). The IAAF announced Moscow the winning candidate at the IAAF Council Meeting in Mombasa on 27 March 2007.

Gothenburg backed out already in December, citing lack of financial support from the Swedish government. Barcelona had a record of hosting the 1992 Summer Olympics and the 1995 IAAF World Indoor Championships. It was chosen over Madrid and Valencia, which were at one point outlined as possible candidates. (Barcelona was later selected as the host for the 2010 European Athletics Championships).

Brisbane simultaneously bid for 2011 and 2013 World Championships with the primary focus being on the 2011 event. Queensland Sport and Athletics Centre (ANZ Stadium) was the proposed venue. The venue had hosted the 1982 Commonwealth Games and 2001 Goodwill Games. It was also a failed bidder for the 2009 World Championships in Athletics, which was eventually won by Berlin.

In the case of Moscow, Deputy Mayor Valery Vinogradov announced on 13 March 2006 that the city would bid for the 2011 Championships and suggested Luzhniki Stadium as venue. When the IAAF elected to decide the 2011 and 2013 events at the same meeting, Moscow added its name to the 2013 list. The city had hosted the 1980 Summer Olympics (also at the Luzhniki Stadium) and the 2006 IAAF World Indoor Championships.

== Venue ==
Main venue was Luzhniki Stadium in Moscow with a capacity of 78,360 spectators.

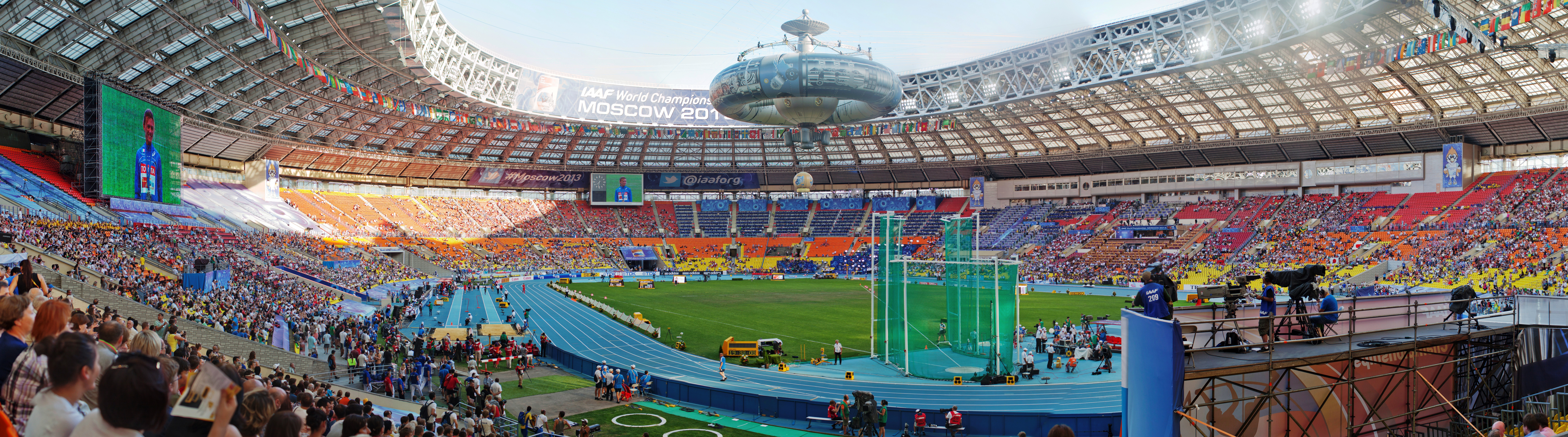
2013 World Championships Athletics panorama.

== Event schedule ==
Day by day event schedule of the 2013 championships

Legend
Key	P	Q	H	½	F
Value	Preliminary round	Qualifiers	Heats	Semifinals	Final

All dates are MSK (UTC+3)

Men
Date →	10 Aug		11 Aug			12 Aug			13 Aug		14 Aug		15 Aug		16 Aug		17 Aug		18 Aug		
Event ↓	M	A	M	A		M	A		M	A	M	A	M	A	M	A	M	A	M	A	
100 m	Q	H		½	F																
200 m															H	½		F			
400 m			H				½			F											
800 m	H			½						F											
1500 m											H					½				F	
5000 m									H							F					
10,000 m		F																			
Marathon																		F			
110 m hurdles			H				½	F													
400 m hurdles						H				½				F							
3000 m steeplechase						H								F							
4 × 100 m relay																				H	F
4 × 400 m relay														H		F					
20 km walk				F																	
50 km walk											F										
Long jump											Q					F					
Triple jump															Q					F	
High jump									Q					F							
Pole vault	Q						F														
Shot put													Q			F					
Discus throw						Q				F											
Hammer throw		Q					F														
Javelin throw													Q					F			
Decathlon	F																				

Women
Date	10 Aug		11 Aug		12 Aug			13 Aug		14 Aug		15 Aug		16 Aug		17 Aug			18 Aug		
Event	M	A	M	A	M	A		M	A	M	A	M	A	M	A	M	A		M	A	
100 m			H			½	F														
200 m												H	½		F						
400 m		H		½		F															
800 m												H			½					F	
1500 m			H						½				F								
5000 m										H							F				
10,000 m				F																	
Marathon		F																			
100 m hurdles														H			½	F			
400 m hurdles					H				½				F								
3000 m steeplechase		H							F												
4 × 100 m relay																				H	F
4 × 400 m relay														H			F				
20 km walk								F													
Long jump		Q		F																	
Triple jump								Q					F								
High jump												Q					F				
Pole vault				Q					F												
Shot put			Q			F															
Discus throw	Q			F																	
Hammer throw										Q					F						
Javelin throw														Q						F	
Heptathlon					F																

== Event summary ==
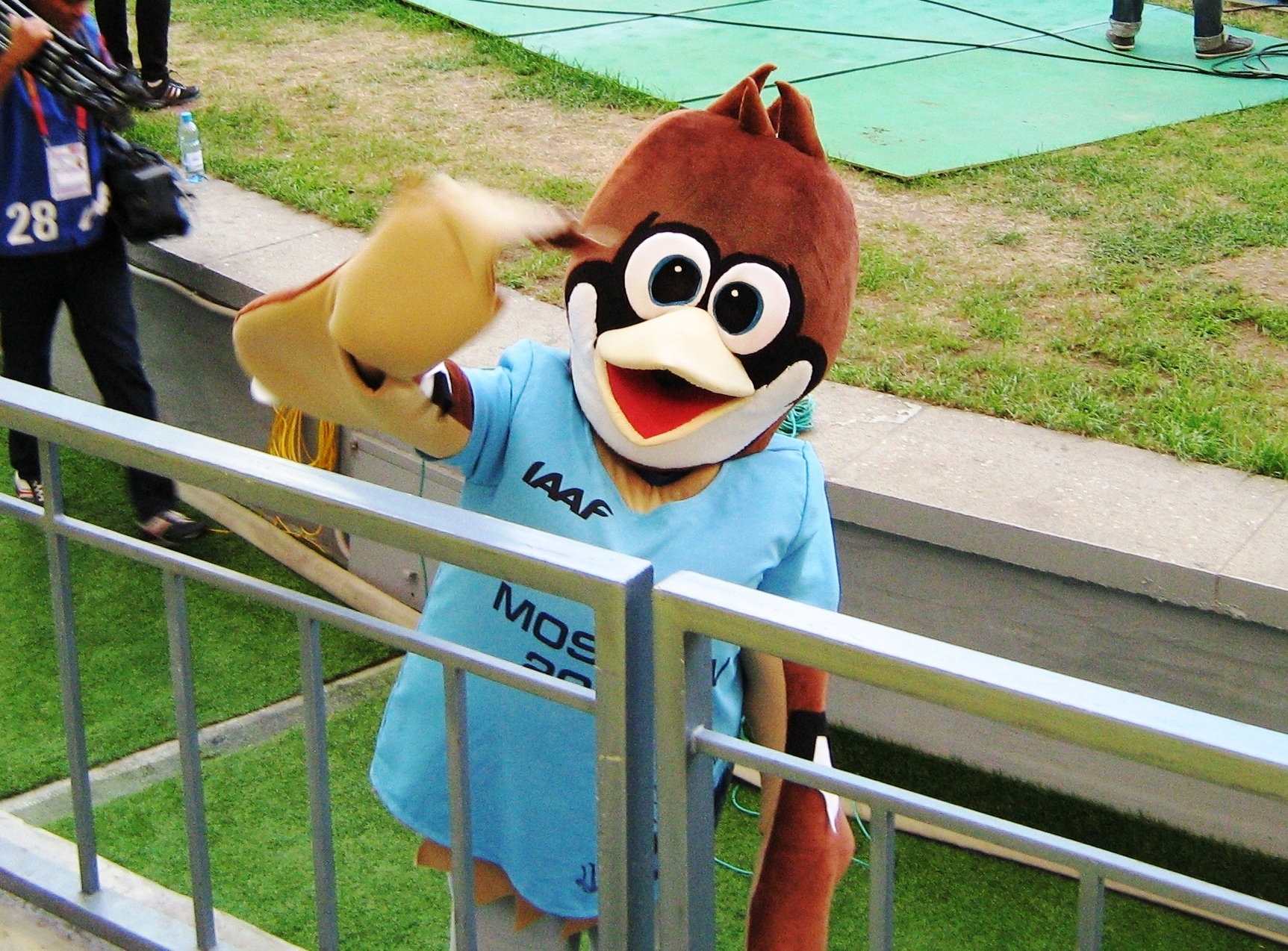
Sparrow mascot of the event.

The championships featured 3 championship records, 22 world leadings, 2 area records, 48 national records but no world records. In addition to gold medals, individual winners received prize money of $60,000 where as members of winning relay teams received $20,000.

=== Men ===
Usain Bolt of Jamaica moved to the top of the all-time World Championships medal table by winning three gold medals. He won the 100 metres, the 200 metres, and Jamaica won the 4 × 100 metres relay behind a strong anchor leg from Bolt who passed the United States' Justin Gatlin down the stretch. It was Bolt's second three gold performance at the World Championships. After the meet, his career total stood at 8 golds and 2 silvers, narrowly surpassing Carl Lewis' 8 golds, 1 silver, and 1 bronze. Trinidad and Tobago's Jehue Gordon edged America's Michael Tinsley by a hundredth of a second to win the 400-metres hurdles. It was the first gold for Trinidad and Tobago since 1997. Serbia's Emir Bekrić took bronze in national record time. Félix Sánchez, competing for the Dominican Republic, also made the final of the event, marking his seventh consecutive World Championship 400-metre hurdles final.

Great Britain's Mo Farah won the 5000 and 10,000 metres to become the second man in history to win both events at both the World Champions and the Olympics. The only man to do it before had been Kenenisa Bekele of Ethiopia. Stephen Kiprotich of Uganda became the first non-Kenyan to win the marathon at the World Championships since 2005. It was also Uganda's first men's title in the history of the event. Kiprotich became only the second man, after Gezahegne Abera, to follow an Olympic marathon gold medal with a world championship marathon gold medal. Ethiopians Lelisa Desisa and Tadese Tola took second and third respectively.

In the high jump, Bohdan Bondarenko set a Championship record of 2.41 (7'10.75") en route to a gold medal in a highly competitive final. Mutaz Essa Barshim of Qatar took second and Derek Drouin set a Canadian national record while winning bronze.

==== Track ====
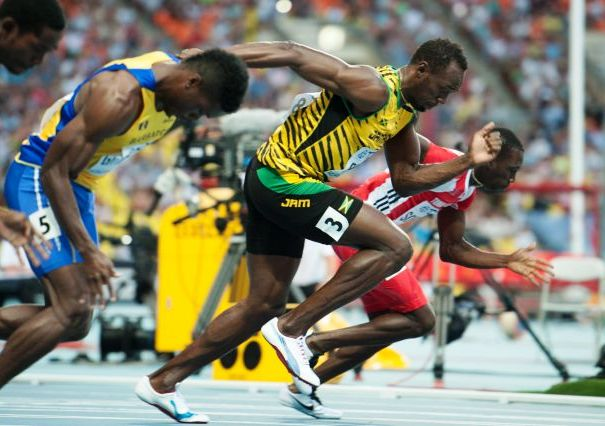
Usain Bolt of Jamaica, winner of the men's 100 metres, here during the heats.

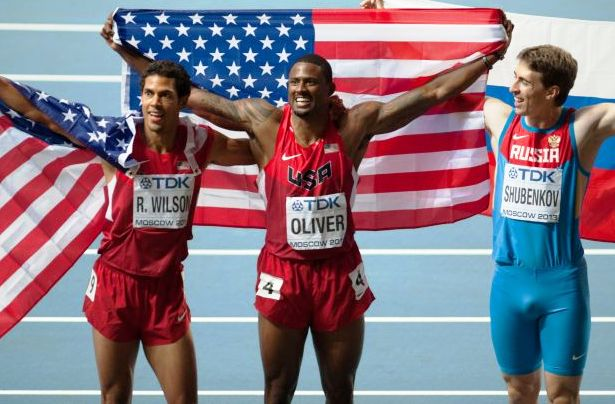
Medalists of the 110 metres hurdles

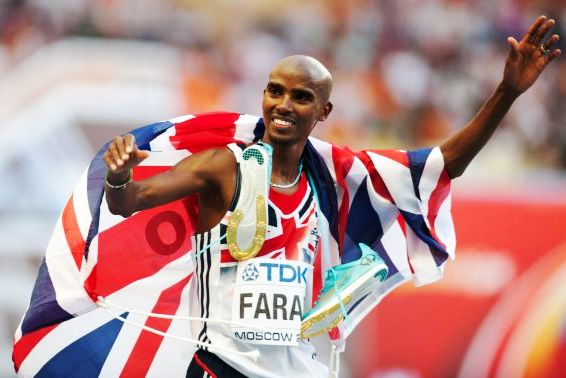
Mo Farah of Great Britain, winner of the 5000 and 10,000 m

Chronology: 2009 | 2011 | 2013 | 2015 | 2017

Event	Gold		Silver		Bronze	
100 metres	Usain Bolt; Jamaica (JAM)	9.77; WL	Justin Gatlin; United States (USA)	9.85; SB	Nesta Carter; Jamaica (JAM)	9.95
200 metres	Usain Bolt; Jamaica (JAM)	19.66; WL	Warren Weir; Jamaica (JAM)	19.79 =PB	Curtis Mitchell; United States (USA)	20.04
400 metres	LaShawn Merritt; United States (USA)	43.74; WL, PB	Tony McQuay; United States (USA)	44.40; PB	Luguelín Santos; Dominican Republic (DOM)	44.52; SB
800 metres	Mohammed Aman; Ethiopia (ETH)	1:43.31; SB	Nick Symmonds; United States (USA)	1:43.55; SB	Ayanleh Souleiman; Djibouti (DJI)	1:43.76
1500 metres	Asbel Kiprop; Kenya (KEN)	3:36.28	Matthew Centrowitz Jr. United States (USA)	3:36.78	Johan Cronje; South Africa (RSA)	3:36.83
5000 metres	Mo Farah; Great Britain & N.I. (GBR)	13:26.98	Hagos Gebrhiwet; Ethiopia (ETH)	13:27.26	Isiah Koech; Kenya (KEN)	13:27.26
10,000 metres	Mo Farah; Great Britain & N.I. (GBR)	27:21.71; SB	Ibrahim Jeilan; Ethiopia (ETH)	27:22.23; SB	Paul Tanui; Kenya (KEN)	27:22.61
Marathon	Stephen Kiprotich; Uganda (UGA)	2:09:51	Lelisa Desisa; Ethiopia (ETH)	2:10:12	Tadese Tola; Ethiopia (ETH)	2:10:23
110 metres hurdles	David Oliver; United States (USA)	13.00; WL	Ryan Wilson; United States (USA)	13.13	Sergey Shubenkov; Russia (RUS)	13.24
400 metres hurdles	Jehue Gordon; Trinidad and Tobago (TRI)	47.69; WL, NR	Michael Tinsley; United States (USA)	47.70; PB	Emir Bekrić; Serbia (SRB)	48.05; NR
3000 metres steeplechase	Ezekiel Kemboi; Kenya (KEN)	8:06.01	Conseslus Kipruto; Kenya (KEN)	8:06.37	Mahiedine Mekhissi-Benabbad; France (FRA)	8:07.86
20 kilometres walk	Chen Ding; China (CHN)	1:21:09; SB	Miguel Ángel López; Spain (ESP)	1:21:21; SB	João Vieira; Portugal (POR)	1:22:05
20 kilometres walk	Aleksandr Ivanov; Russia (RUS)	1:20.58	Miguel Ángel López; Spain (ESP)	1:21:21; SB	João Vieira; Portugal (POR)	1:22:05
50 kilometres walk	Robert Heffernan; Ireland (IRL)	3:37:56; WL	Jared Tallent; Australia (AUS)	3:40:03; SB	Ihor Hlavan; Ukraine (UKR)	3:40:39; PB
50 kilometres walk	Robert Heffernan; Ireland (IRL)	3:37:56; WL	Mikhail Ryzhov; Russia (RUS)	3:38.58; PB	Ihor Hlavan; Ukraine (UKR)	3:40:39; PB
4 × 100 metres relay	Jamaica; Nesta Carter; Kemar Bailey-Cole; Nickel Ashmeade; Usain Bolt; Oshane Bailey*; Warren Weir*	37.36; WL	United States; Charles Silmon; Mike Rodgers; Rakieem Salaam; Justin Gatlin	37.66	Canada; Gavin Smellie; Aaron Brown; Dontae Richards-Kwok; Justyn Warner	37.92; SB
4 × 400 metres relay	United States; David Verburg; Tony McQuay; Arman Hall; LaShawn Merritt; Joshua Mance*; James Harris*	2:58.71; WL	Jamaica; Rusheen McDonald; Edino Steele; Omar Johnson; Javon Francis; Javere Bell*	2:59.88; SB	Great Britain & N.I. Conrad Williams; Martyn Rooney; Michael Bingham; Nigel Levine; Jamie Bowie*	3:00.88
4 × 400 metres relay	United States; David Verburg; Tony McQuay; Arman Hall; LaShawn Merritt; Joshua Mance*; James Harris*	2:58.71; WL	Jamaica; Rusheen McDonald; Edino Steele; Omar Johnson; Javon Francis; Javere Bell*	2:59.88; SB	Russia; Maksim Dyldin; Lev Mosin; Sergey Petukhov; Vladimir Krasnov	2:59.90
WR world record | AR area record | CR championship record | GR games record | NR national record | OR Olympic record | PB personal best | SB season best | WL world leading (in a given season) * Medalists who participated in heats only.

==== Field ====
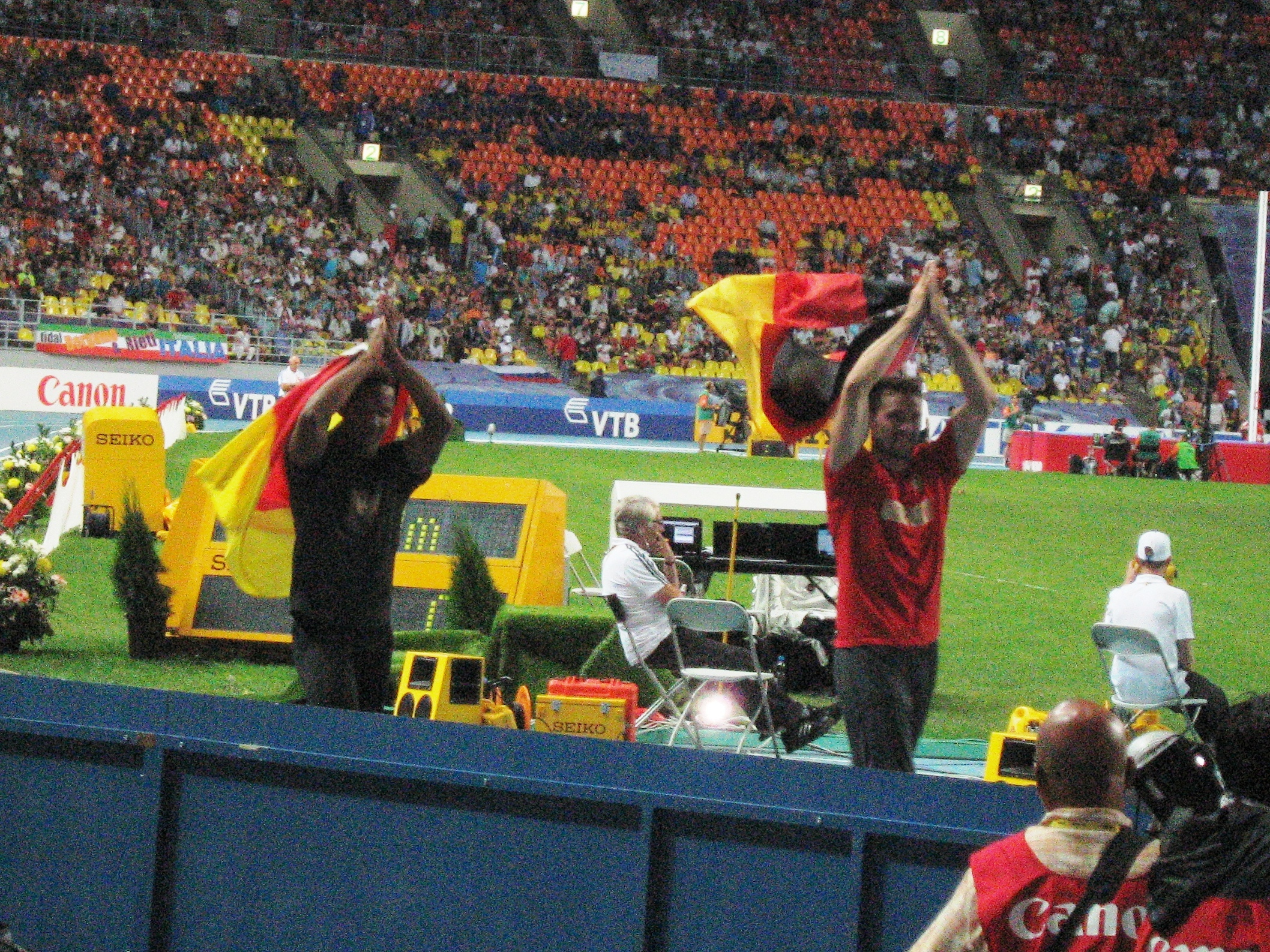
Raphael Holzdeppe and Björn Otto of Germany, the gold and bronze medalist of the men's pole vault.

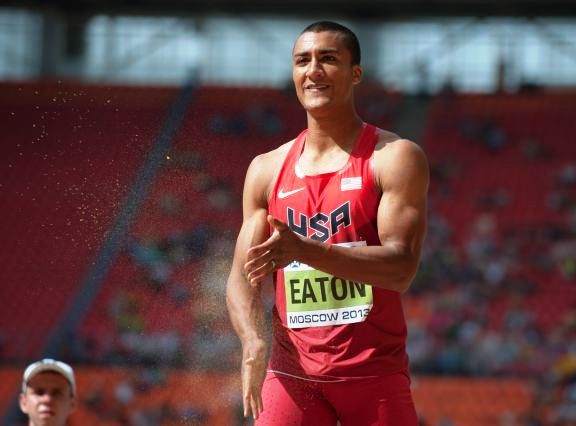
Ashton Eaton of United States, winner of the men's decathlon.

Chronology: 2009 | 2011 | 2013 | 2015 | 2017

Event	Gold		Silver		Bronze	
High jump	Bohdan Bondarenko; Ukraine (UKR)	2.41; WL, CR, =NR	Mutaz Essa Barshim; Qatar (QAT)	2.38	Derek Drouin; Canada (CAN)	2.38; NR
Pole vault	Raphael Holzdeppe; Germany (GER)	5.89	Renaud Lavillenie; France (FRA)	5.89	Björn Otto; Germany (GER)	5.82
Long jump	Aleksandr Menkov; Russia (RUS)	8.56; WL, NR	Ignisious Gaisah; Netherlands (NED)	8.29; NR	Luis Rivera; Mexico (MEX)	8.27
Triple jump	Teddy Tamgho; France (FRA)	18.04; WL, NR	Pedro Pablo Pichardo; Cuba (CUB)	17.68	Will Claye; United States (USA)	17.52; SB
Shot put	David Storl; Germany (GER)	21.73; SB	Ryan Whiting; United States (USA)	21.57	Dylan Armstrong; Canada (CAN)	21.34; SB
Discus throw	Robert Harting; Germany (GER)	69.11	Piotr Małachowski; Poland (POL)	68.36	Gerd Kanter; Estonia (EST)	65.19
Javelin throw	Vítězslav Veselý; Czech Republic (CZE)	87.17	Tero Pitkämäki; Finland (FIN)	87.07	Dmitriy Tarabin; Russia (RUS)	86.23
Hammer throw	Paweł Fajdek; Poland (POL)	81.97; WL, PB	Krisztián Pars; Hungary (HUN)	80.30	Lukáš Melich; Czech Republic (CZE)	79.36
Decathlon	Ashton Eaton; United States (USA)	8809; WL	Michael Schrader; Germany (GER)	8670; PB	Damian Warner; Canada (CAN)	8512; PB
WR world record | AR area record | CR championship record | GR games record | NR national record | OR Olympic record | PB personal best | SB season best | WL world leading (in a given season)

=== Women ===
Shelly-Ann Fraser-Pryce became the first woman in World Championships history to sweep the sprint events when anchored Jamaica to gold in the 4 × 100-metres relay. Jamaica's time of 41.29 set a Championships record. Earlier in the meet, Fraser-Pryce won the 100 metres and the 200 metres. In the final of the 200 metres, Allyson Felix tore her right hamstring. A photo-finish gave Murielle Ahouré of the Ivory Coast the silver over Nigeria's Blessing Okagbare after both finished in the same time.

Great Britain's Christine Ohuruogu won the 400 metres in a national record time of 49.41. She came from behind to edge out defending champion Amantle Montsho of Botswana by 4 thousands of a second in a photo finish. Zuzana Hejnová won gold and set a Czech national record in the 400-metres hurdles. Eunice Sum of Kenya won her first major title, besting Olympic champion Mariya Savinova of Russia in the 800 metres.

In the 4 × 400 m relay, although the United States suffered a time-wasting exchange on the final leg, the Americans won by more than two seconds over Great Britain and France. The medal ceremony for the event took place at the 2017 IAAF World Championships in London upon the certification of results by the IAAF following the retroactive disqualification of first-place Russia when Antonina Krivoshapka was retroactively disqualified on a positive drug test in a 2017 retest of samples.

Russia's Tatyana Lysenko set a World Championships record in the hammer throw en route to the gold. Caterine Ibargüen won Colombia's first ever World Championship gold by finishing first in the triple jump. Christina Obergföll of Germany won her first World Championships title in javelin.

==== Track ====
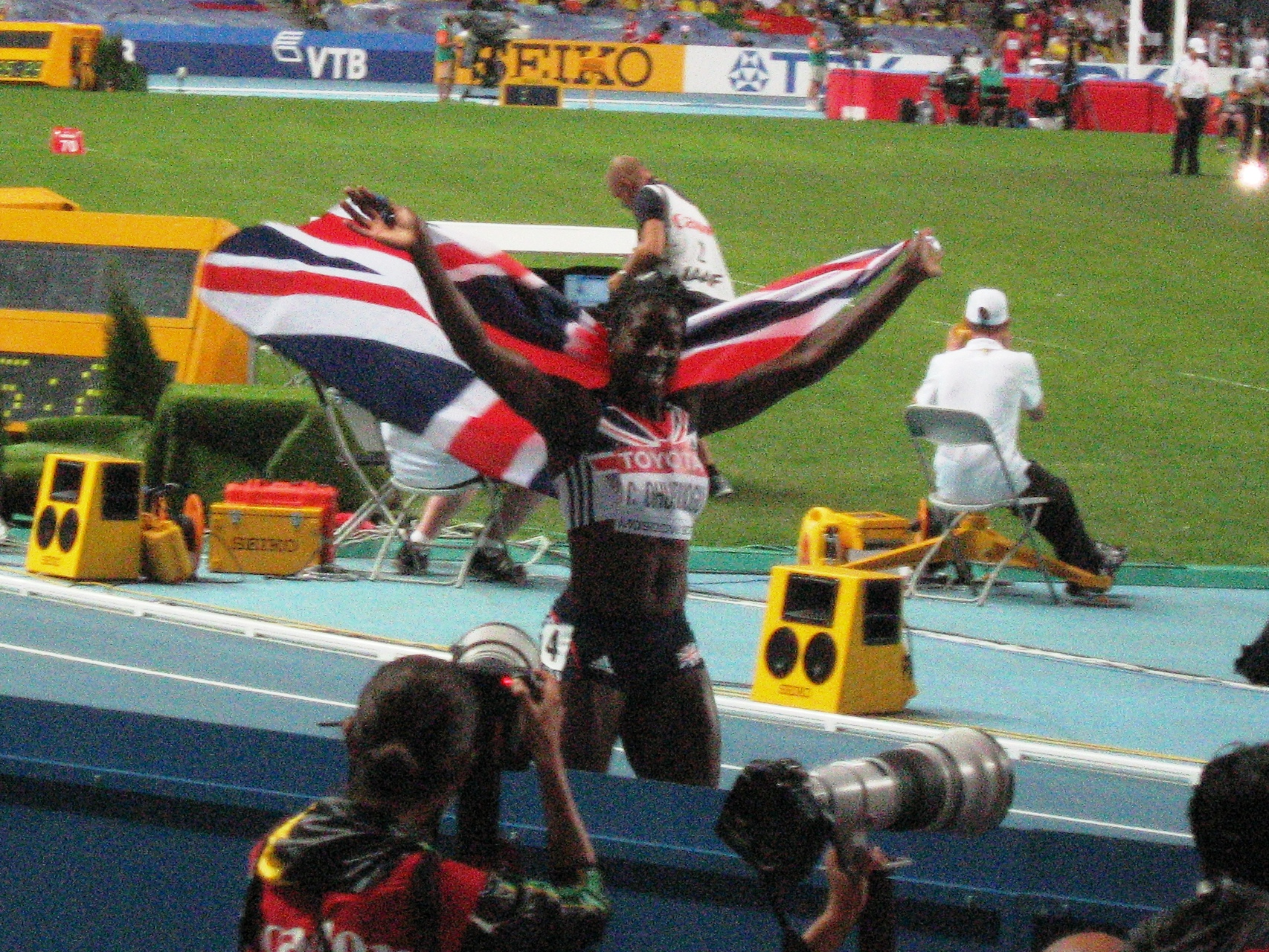
Christine Ohuruogu of Great Britain, winner of the 400 metres

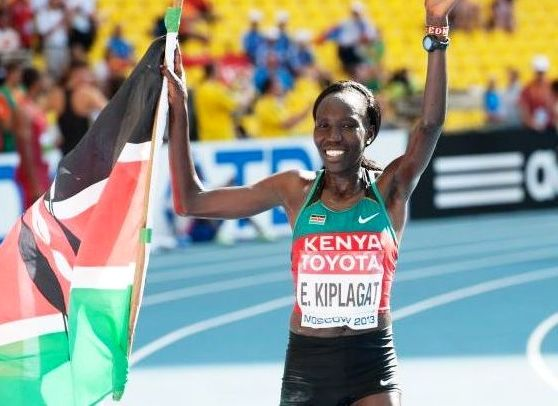
Edna Kiplagat after winning the marathon

Chronology: 2009 | 2011 | 2013 | 2015 | 2017

Event	Gold		Silver		Bronze	
100 metres	Shelly-Ann Fraser-Pryce; Jamaica (JAM)	10.71; WL	Murielle Ahouré; Ivory Coast (CIV)	10.93	Carmelita Jeter; United States (USA)	10.94
200 metres	Shelly-Ann Fraser-Pryce; Jamaica (JAM)	22.17	Murielle Ahouré; Ivory Coast (CIV)	22.32	Blessing Okagbare; Nigeria (NGR)	22.32
400 metres	Christine Ohuruogu; Great Britain & N.I. (GBR)	49.41; NR	Amantle Montsho; Botswana (BOT)	49.41	Stephenie Ann McPherson; Jamaica (JAM)	49.99
400 metres	Christine Ohuruogu; Great Britain & N.I. (GBR)	49.41; NR	Amantle Montsho; Botswana (BOT)	49.41	Antonina Krivoshapka; Russia (RUS)	49.78
800 metres	Eunice Sum; Kenya (KEN)	1:57.38; PB	Brenda Martinez; United States (USA)	1:57.91; PB	Alysia Montaño; United States (USA)	1:57.95
800 metres	Eunice Sum; Kenya (KEN)	1:57.38; PB	Mariya Savinova; Russia (RUS)	1:57.80	Alysia Montaño; United States (USA)	1:57.95
1500 metres	Abeba Aregawi; Sweden (SWE)	4:02.67	Jennifer Simpson; United States (USA)	4:02.99	Hellen Obiri; Kenya (KEN)	4:03.86
5000 metres	Meseret Defar; Ethiopia (ETH)	14:50.19	Mercy Cherono; Kenya (KEN)	14:51.22	Almaz Ayana; Ethiopia (ETH)	14:51.33
10,000 metres	Tirunesh Dibaba; Ethiopia (ETH)	30:43.35	Gladys Cherono; Kenya (KEN)	30:45.17	Belaynesh Oljira; Ethiopia (ETH)	30:46.98
Marathon	Edna Kiplagat; Kenya (KEN)	2:25:44	Valeria Straneo; Italy (ITA)	2:25:58; SB	Kayoko Fukushi; Japan (JPN)	2:27:45
100 metres hurdles	Brianna Rollins; United States (USA)	12.44	Sally Pearson; Australia (AUS)	12.50; SB	Tiffany Porter; Great Britain & N.I. (GBR)	12.55; PB
400 metres hurdles	Zuzana Hejnová; Czech Republic (CZE)	52.83; WL, NR	Dalilah Muhammad; United States (USA)	54.09	Lashinda Demus; United States (USA)	54.27
3000 metres steeplechase	Milcah Chemos Cheywa; Kenya (KEN)	9:11.65; WL	Lydiah Chepkurui; Kenya (KEN)	9:12.55; PB	Sofia Assefa; Ethiopia (ETH)	9:12.84; SB
20 kilometres walk	Liu Hong; China (CHN)	1:28:10	Sun Huanhuan; China (CHN)	1:28:32	Elisa Rigaudo; Italy (ITA)	1:28:41
20 kilometres walk	Elena Lashmanova; Russia (RUS)	1:27:08	Anisya Kirdyapkina; Russia (RUS)	1:27:11	Elisa Rigaudo; Italy (ITA)	1:28:41
4 × 100 metres relay	Jamaica; Carrie Russell; Kerron Stewart; Schillonie Calvert; Shelly-Ann Fraser-Pryce; Sheri-Ann Brooks*	41.29; WL, CR	United States; Jeneba Tarmoh; Alexandria Anderson; English Gardner; Octavious Freeman	42.75	Great Britain & N.I. Dina Asher-Smith; Ashleigh Nelson; Annabelle Lewis; Hayley Jones	42.87
4 × 400 metres relay	United States; Jessica Beard; Natasha Hastings; Ashley Spencer; Francena McCorory; Joanna Atkins*	3:20.41; SB	Great Britain & N.I. Eilidh Child; Shana Cox; Margaret Adeoye; Christine Ohuruogu	3:22.61; SB	France; Marie Gayot; Lénora Guion-Firmin; Muriel Hurtis; Floria Gueï; Phara Anacharsis*	3:24.21
4 × 400 metres relay	Russia; Yuliya Gushchina; Tatyana Firova; Kseniya Ryzhova; Antonina Krivoshapka; Natalya Antyukh*	3:20.19; WL	Great Britain & N.I. Eilidh Child; Shana Cox; Margaret Adeoye; Christine Ohuruogu	3:22.61; SB	France; Marie Gayot; Lénora Guion-Firmin; Muriel Hurtis; Floria Gueï; Phara Anacharsis*	3:24.21
WR world record | AR area record | CR championship record | GR games record | NR national record | OR Olympic record | PB personal best | SB season best | WL world leading (in a given season) * Runners who participated in the heats only and received medals.

==== Field ====
Chronology: 2009 | 2011 | 2013 | 2015 | 2017

Women jump event winners

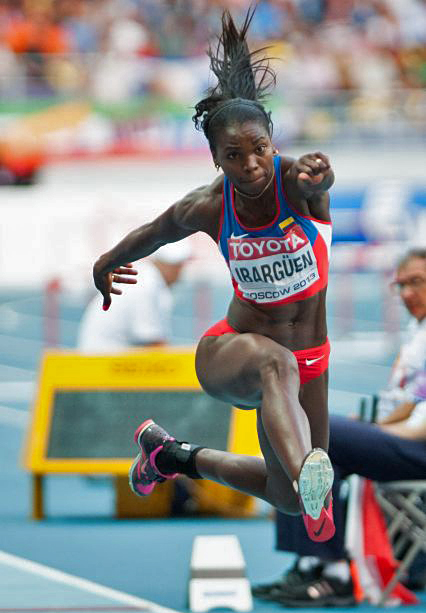
Caterine Ibargüen (COL), triple jump

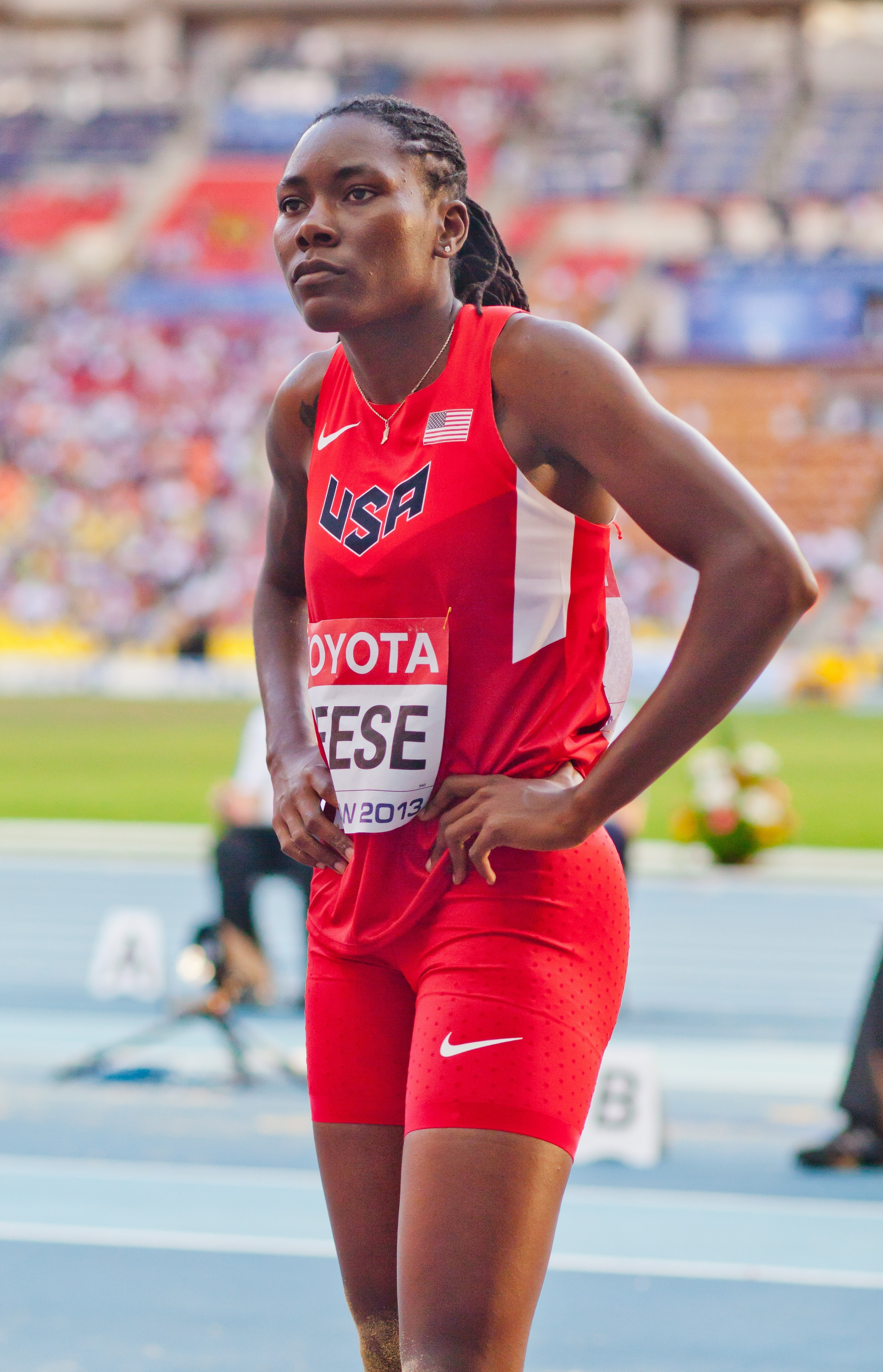
Brittney Reese (USA), long jump

Event	Gold		Silver		Bronze	
High jump	Brigetta Barrett; United States (USA)	2.00	Anna Chicherova; Russia (RUS); Ruth Beitia; Spain (ESP)	1.97	Not awarded	
High jump	Svetlana Shkolina; Russia (RUS)	2.03; PB	Anna Chicherova; Russia (RUS); Ruth Beitia; Spain (ESP)	1.97	Not awarded	
Pole vault	Yelena Isinbayeva; Russia (RUS)	4.89; SB	Jenn Suhr; United States (USA)	4.82	Yarisley Silva; Cuba (CUB)	4.82
Long jump	Brittney Reese; United States (USA)	7.01	Blessing Okagbare; Nigeria (NGR)	6.99	Ivana Španović; Serbia (SRB)	6.82; NR
Triple jump	Caterine Ibargüen; Colombia (COL)	14.85; WL	Ekaterina Koneva; Russia (RUS)	14.81	Olha Saladuha; Ukraine (UKR)	14.65
Shot put	Valerie Adams; New Zealand (NZL)	20.88	Christina Schwanitz; Germany (GER)	20.41; PB	Gong Lijiao; China (CHN)	19.95
Discus throw	Sandra Perković; Croatia (CRO)	67.99	Mélina Robert-Michon; France (FRA)	66.28; NR	Yarelys Barrios; Cuba (CUB)	64.96
Hammer throw	Anita Włodarczyk; Poland (POL)	78.46; NR	Zhang Wenxiu; China (CHN)	75.58; SB	Wang Zheng; China (CHN)	74.90; PB
Hammer throw	Tatyana Lysenko; Russia (RUS)	78.80; CR	Zhang Wenxiu; China (CHN)	75.58; SB	Wang Zheng; China (CHN)	74.90; PB
Javelin throw	Christina Obergföll; Germany (GER)	69.05; SB	Kimberley Mickle; Australia (AUS)	66.60; PB	Mariya Abakumova; Russia (RUS)	65.09
Heptathlon	Hanna Melnychenko; Ukraine (UKR)	6586; PB	Brianne Theisen-Eaton; Canada (CAN)	6530; PB	Dafne Schippers; Netherlands (NED)	6477; NR
WR world record | AR area record | CR championship record | GR games record | NR national record | OR Olympic record | PB personal best | SB season best | WL world leading (in a given season)

== Statistics ==
=== Medal table ===
A total of 47 sets of medals were distributed between 39 countries. (Note: Two silver medals were awarded in women's high jump.) Initially, host nation Russia topped the medal table with seven gold medals. However, after numerous disqualifications of Russians athletes for doping, the United States topped the medal table with eight golds. In the overall medal count, the United States won 26 medals in total, followed by Kenya with 12.

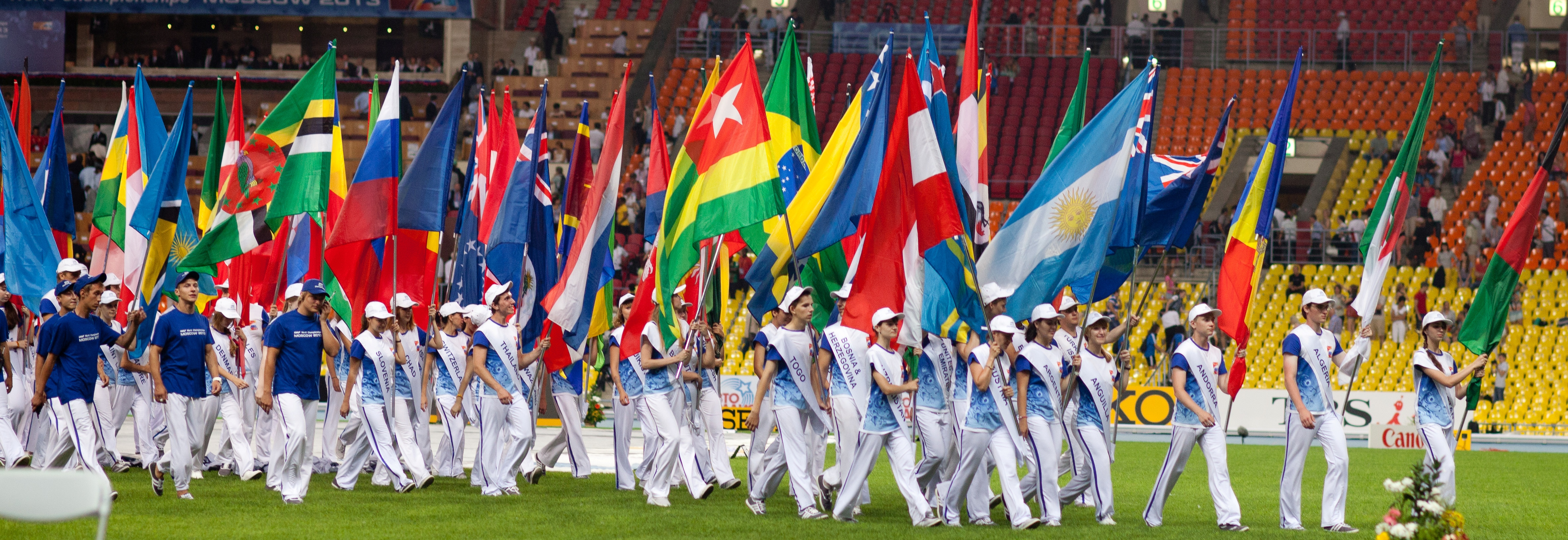
Flag parade during opening ceremony

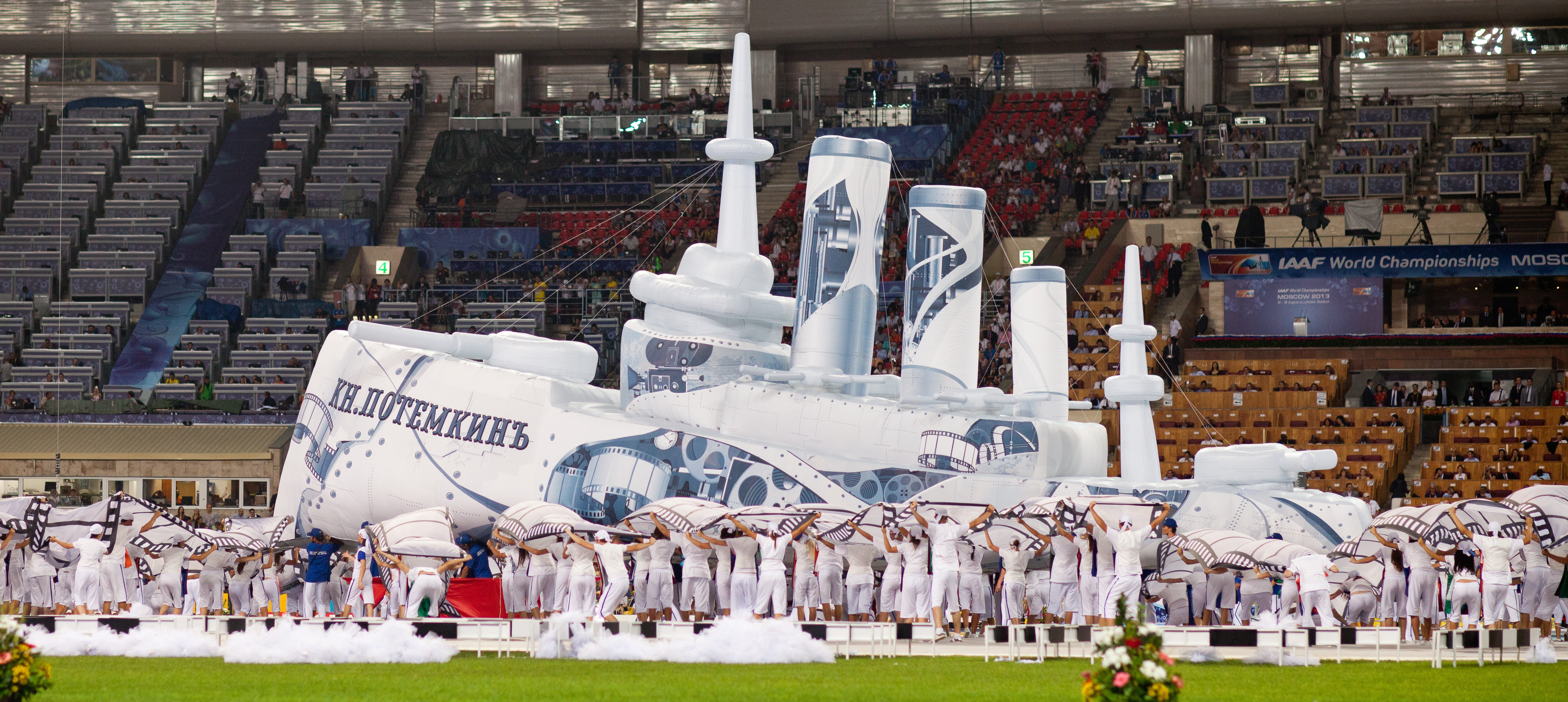
Scene from the opening ceremony

* Host nation (Russia)

Rank	Nation	Gold	Silver	Bronze	Total
1	United States	8	13	5	26
2	Jamaica	6	2	2	10
3	Kenya	5	4	3	12
4	Germany	4	2	1	7
5	Ethiopia	3	3	4	10
6	Great Britain & N.I.	3	1	3	7
7	Russia*	2	2	3	7
8	China	2	2	2	6
9	Poland	2	1	0	3
10	Ukraine	2	0	2	4
11	Czech Republic	2	0	1	3
12	France	1	2	2	5
13	Colombia	1	0	0	1
13	Croatia	1	0	0	1
13	Ireland	1	0	0	1
13	New Zealand	1	0	0	1
13	Sweden	1	0	0	1
13	Trinidad and Tobago	1	0	0	1
13	Uganda	1	0	0	1
20	Australia	0	3	0	3
21	Ivory Coast	0	2	0	2
21	Spain	0	2	0	2
23	Canada	0	1	4	5
24	Cuba	0	1	2	3
25	Italy	0	1	1	2
25	Netherlands	0	1	1	2
25	Nigeria	0	1	1	2
28	Botswana	0	1	0	1
28	Finland	0	1	0	1
28	Hungary	0	1	0	1
28	Qatar	0	1	0	1
32	Serbia	0	0	2	2
33	Djibouti	0	0	1	1
33	Dominican Republic	0	0	1	1
33	Estonia	0	0	1	1
33	Japan	0	0	1	1
33	Mexico	0	0	1	1
33	Portugal	0	0	1	1
33	South Africa	0	0	1	1
Totals (39 entries)		47	48	46	141

=== Points ===
The IAAF placing table assigns eight points to the first place and so on to the eight finalists (except teams that do not start or are disqualified). 59 IAAF members received points.

Rank	Country	1st place, gold medalist(s)	2nd place, silver medalist(s)	3rd place, bronze medalist(s)	4	5	6	7	8	Pts
1	United States	8	13	5	9	7	7	3	8	293
2	Kenya	5	4	3	6	2	3	3	1	140
3	Russia	2	2	3	3	5	3	6	4	108
4	Germany	4	2	1	7	2	1	1	3	103
5	Jamaica	6	2	2	3	2	0	1	3	102
6	Ethiopia	3	3	4	2	3	0	3	1	98
7	Great Britain & N.I.	3	1	3	1	5	1	1	2	81
8	France	1	2	2	1	0	0	5	2	51
8	Ukraine	2	0	2	2	0	3	2	0	51
10	China	2	2	2	0	0	2	0	2	50
10	Poland	2	1	0	1	2	3	2	1	50
12	Canada	0	1	4	0	0	3	1	0	42
13	Czech Republic	2	0	1	0	3	0	3	0	40
14	Cuba	0	1	2	2	1	0	0	1	34
14	Japan	0	0	1	1	4	2	0	2	34
16	Australia	0	3	0	0	1	1	1	0	30
16	Spain	0	2	0	2	1	0	1	0	30
18	Netherlands	0	1	1	0	2	0	1	1	24
19	Italy	0	1	1	0	0	2	1	2	23
20	Brazil	0	0	0	0	2	3	1	1	20
20	Nigeria	0	1	1	0	1	1	0	0	20
22	South Africa	0	0	1	0	1	2	1	0	18
23	Ivory Coast	0	2	0	0	0	0	0	0	14
23	Trinidad and Tobago	1	0	0	0	1	0	1	0	14
25	Sweden	1	0	0	1	0	0	0	0	13
26	Serbia	0	0	2	0	0	0	0	0	12
27	Finland	0	1	0	0	1	0	0	0	11
28	Belgium	0	0	0	2	0	0	0	0	10
28	Dominican Republic	0	0	1	0	1	0	0	0	10
28	Hungary	0	1	0	0	0	1	0	0	10
31	Portugal	0	0	1	0	0	1	0	0	9
32	Bahamas	0	0	0	1	0	1	0	0	8
32	Colombia	1	0	0	0	0	0	0	0	8
32	Croatia	1	0	0	0	0	0	0	0	8
32	Ireland	1	0	0	0	0	0	0	0	8
32	Mexico	0	0	1	0	0	0	1	0	8
32	New Zealand	1	0	0	0	0	0	0	0	8
32	Uganda	1	0	0	0	0	0	0	0	8
39	Botswana	0	1	0	0	0	0	0	0	7
39	Estonia	0	0	1	0	0	0	0	1	7
39	Qatar	0	1	0	0	0	0	0	0	7
39	Slovakia	0	0	0	1	0	0	1	0	7
43	Djibouti	0	0	1	0	0	0	0	0	6
43	Romania	0	0	0	0	0	2	0	0	6
45	Belarus	0	0	0	1	0	0	0	0	5
45	Norway	0	0	0	0	0	1	0	2	5
45	Slovenia	0	0	0	1	0	0	0	0	5
48	Saudi Arabia	0	0	0	0	0	1	0	1	4
49	Bahrain	0	0	0	0	0	1	0	0	3
49	Israel	0	0	0	0	0	1	0	0	3
49	Puerto Rico	0	0	0	0	0	1	0	0	3
52	Argentina	0	0	0	0	0	0	1	0	2
52	Egypt	0	0	0	0	0	0	1	0	2
52	Grenada	0	0	0	0	0	0	1	0	2
52	India	0	0	0	0	0	0	1	0	2
52	Senegal	0	0	0	0	0	0	1	0	2
57	Bulgaria	0	0	0	0	0	0	0	1	1
57	Eritrea	0	0	0	0	0	0	0	1	1
57	North Korea	0	0	0	0	0	0	0	1	1
Total		47	48	46	47	47	47	45	40	1682

Host.

== Participating nations ==
206 countries (or more accurately, IAAF members) participated with a total of 1974 athletes. The biggest delegation was the one of USA with 137 athletes. The number of athletes sent per nation is show in parentheses.

- Afghanistan (1)
- Albania (2)
- Algeria (11)
- American Samoa (1)
- Andorra (1)
- Angola (1)
- Anguilla (1)
- Antigua and Barbuda (1)
- Argentina (8)
- Armenia (1)
- Aruba (1)
- Australia (47)
- Austria (2)
- Azerbaijan (2)
- Bahamas (26)
- Bahrain (10)
- Bangladesh (1)
- Barbados (9)
- Belarus (27)
- Belgium (17)
- Benin (1)
- Bermuda (2)
- Bhutan (1)
- Bolivia (2)
- Bosnia and Herzegovina (2)
- Botswana (11)
- Brazil (32)
- British Virgin Islands (3)
- Brunei (1)
- Bulgaria (10)
- Burkina Faso (1)
- Burundi (1)
- Cambodia (1)
- Cameroon (1)
- Canada (46)
- Cape Verde (1)
- Cayman Islands (1)
- Central African Republic (1)
- Chad (1)
- Chile (7)
- China (53)
- Colombia (20)
- Comoros (1)
- Congo (1)
- Cook Islands (1)
- Costa Rica (1)
- Croatia (7)
- Cuba (25)
- Cyprus (2)
- Czech Republic (28)
- DR Congo (1)
- Denmark (2)
- Djibouti (1)
- Dominica (1)
- Dominican Republic (10)
- Ecuador (12)
- Egypt (4)
- El Salvador (1)
- Equatorial Guinea (1)
- Eritrea (10)
- Estonia (9)
- Ethiopia (46)
- Fiji (2)
- Finland (10)
- France (52)
- French Polynesia (1)
- Gabon (2)
- Gambia (1)
- Georgia (2)
- Germany (67)
- Ghana (1)
- Gibraltar (1)
- Great Britain & N.I. (60)
- Greece (17)
- Grenada (2)
- Guam (1)
- Guatemala (6)
- Guinea (1)
- Guinea-Bissau (1)
- Guyana (3)
- Haiti (1)
- Honduras (1)
- Hong Kong (6)
- Hungary (11)
- Iceland (1)
- India (15)
- Indonesia (1)
- Iran (6)
- Iraq (1)
- Ireland (11)
- Israel (3)
- Italy (57)
- Ivory Coast (3)
- Jamaica (45)
- Japan (41)
- Jordan (1)
- Kazakhstan (17)
- Kenya (49)
- Kiribati (1)
- Kuwait (1)
- Kyrgyzstan (2)
- Laos (1)
- Latvia (10)
- Lesotho (3)
- Lithuania (14)
- Luxembourg (1)
- Macau (1)
- Macedonia (1)
- Madagascar (2)
- Malawi (1)
- Malaysia (1)
- Maldives (1)
- Mali (1)
- Malta (1)
- Marshall Islands (1)
- Mauritania (1)
- Mauritius (1)
- Mexico (16)
- Federated States of Micronesia (1)
- Moldova (4)
- Monaco (1)
- Mongolia (2)
- Montenegro (2)
- Montserrat (1)
- Morocco (21)
- Mozambique (1)
- Myanmar (1)
- Namibia (6)
- Nauru (1)
- Netherlands (23)
- New Zealand (9)
- Nicaragua (1)
- Niger (1)
- Nigeria (17)
- North Korea (4)
- Northern Mariana Islands (1)
- Norway (11)
- Oman (1)
- Pakistan (1)
- Palau (1)
- Palestine (1)
- Panama (1)
- Papua New Guinea (2)
- Paraguay (1)
- Philippines (1)
- Peru (2)
- Poland (55)
- Portugal (12)
- Puerto Rico (4)
- Qatar (5)
- Romania (18)
- Russia (119)
- Rwanda (2)
- Saint Kitts and Nevis (6)
- Saint Lucia (3)
- Saint Vincent and the Grenadines (2)
- Samoa (1)
- San Marino (1)
- São Tomé and Príncipe (1)
- Saudi Arabia (11)
- Senegal (5)
- Serbia (8)
- Seychelles (1)
- Sierra Leone (1)
- Singapore (1)
- Slovakia (11)
- Slovenia (9)
- Solomon Islands (1)
- Somalia (1)
- South Africa (30)
- South Korea (16)
- Spain (41)
- Sri Lanka (8)
- Sudan (1)
- Suriname (1)
- Swaziland (1)
- Sweden (24)
- Switzerland (18)
- Syria (1)
- Chinese Taipei (7)
- Tajikistan (2)
- Tanzania (2)
- Thailand (2)
- Timor-Leste (1)
- Togo (1)
- Tonga (1)
- Trinidad and Tobago (21)
- Tunisia (4)
- Turkey (10)
- Turkmenistan (1)
- Turks and Caicos Islands (1)
- Tuvalu (1)
- Uganda (12)
- Ukraine (61)
- United Arab Emirates (1)
- United States (137)
- Uruguay (1)
- Uzbekistan (3)
- Vanuatu (1)
- Venezuela (15)
- Vietnam (1)
- U.S. Virgin Islands (1)
- Yemen (1)
- Zambia (3)
- Zimbabwe (2)

== Broadcasting ==
- Argentina: TyC Sports
- Austria: ORF Sport +
- Belgium: Canvas, La Deux
- Bosnia and Herzegovina: BHT 1
- Brazil: SporTV
- Bulgaria: BNT 1
- Colombia: Caracol TV
- Costa Rica: Teletica
- Croatia: HRT 2
- Cuba Tele Rebelde
- Czech Republic: ČT Sport
- Denmark: DR3
- El Salvador: Canal 4
- Estonia: ETV
- European Union: Eurosport, EBU
- Finland: Yle
- Iceland: RÚV
- France: France 2
- Germany: ARD,: ZDF
- Greece: HBC
- Hong Kong: STAR Sports (only in Score Tonight)
- India: TEN Sports
- Israel: IBA 1
- Italy: Rai Sport 1
- Jamaica: TVJ
- Japan: TBS
- Latvia: LTV 7
- Lithuania: LRT
- Macedonia: ALFA TV
- Netherlands: NOS
- Norway: NRK1, NRK2
- Pakistan: TEN Sports
- Peru: ATV
- Poland: TVP
- Portugal: RTP2
- Russia: Russia 2, Sport 1
- Serbia: RTS 2
- Slovakia: Dvojka
- Slovenia: RTV Slo 2
- South Africa: SuperSport
- Spain: Teledeporte
- Sweden: TV4
- Switzerland: SRG SSR
- Turkey: TRT 3
- United Kingdom: BBC Sport
- Ukraine: NTU
- United States: Universal Sports, NBC Sports

=== American coverage ===
In the United States the IAAF sold exclusive rights to Universal Sports, a network associated with NBC Sports. Universal Sports can only be seen in about ten percent of the households in the American market. While NBC provided an hour and a half of coverage on weekend days, Universal Sports limited other distribution of the content, even online content requiring login with cable subscription user names. For those viewers without access to Universal Sports, nationwide coverage of the entire meet was generally limited to six hours of weekend coverage. The IAAF provided short YouTube highlight clips, a fraction of the online coverage they provided from Daegu two years earlier, instead promoting an internet radio feed and Twitter updates.

== Controversies ==
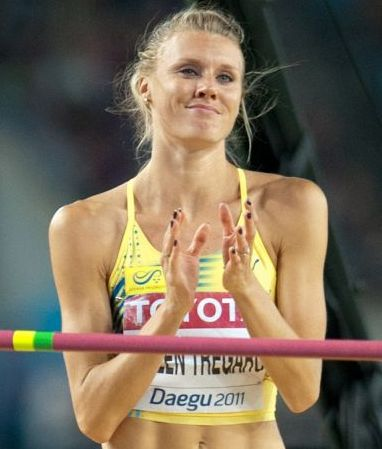
Emma Green Tregaro (SWE) painted her nails in support of gay rights

The introduction of a Russia federal law in June banning "homosexual propaganda" affected the championships hosted in Moscow. Western and international bodies had already condemned the move prior to the event, which was scheduled several months prior to the more prominent 2014 Winter Olympics in Sochi. The IAAF deputy secretary general, Nick Davies, stated that the international nature of the competition might alter the country's perspective, but that the matter of gay rights would not be addressed by the championships, as long as its athletes were unaffected. Russian politician Vitaly Milonov had stated that the law would apply to athletes and tourists in the same way as Russian citizens. He also said those suggesting a boycott of the championships in protest of the laws were merely avoiding their competitors, saying "sports competitions are a place where there can't be any politics".

Several athletes voiced their concerns over the issue of gay rights in Russia, but none boycotted the event. American runner Nick Symmonds, a supporter of the NOH8 Campaign for equal rights, said he would respect the host nation and its laws and would focus on sporting competition only in Moscow. However, he maintained his position as an advocate of gay rights and would silently dedicate his performance "to my gay and lesbian friends back home".

Two Swedish athletes, high jumper Emma Green Tregaro and sprinter Moa Hjelmer, attracted attention when they painted their nails in a rainbow pattern in support of gay rights and displayed the colours during the qualifying rounds. The IAAF notified the Swedish Athletics Federation that this gesture was in breach of rules on athlete conduct. The Swedish officials stood by Green Tregaro, but she relented under the pressure – in the high jump finals, she sported all red nails as a symbol of love. While watching the high jump finals, Paavo Arhinmäki, the Finnish Minister for Culture and Sport, waved a rainbow flag at the arena. Hjelmer had been eliminated in the first round of the 200 metres and did not compete again at the championships.

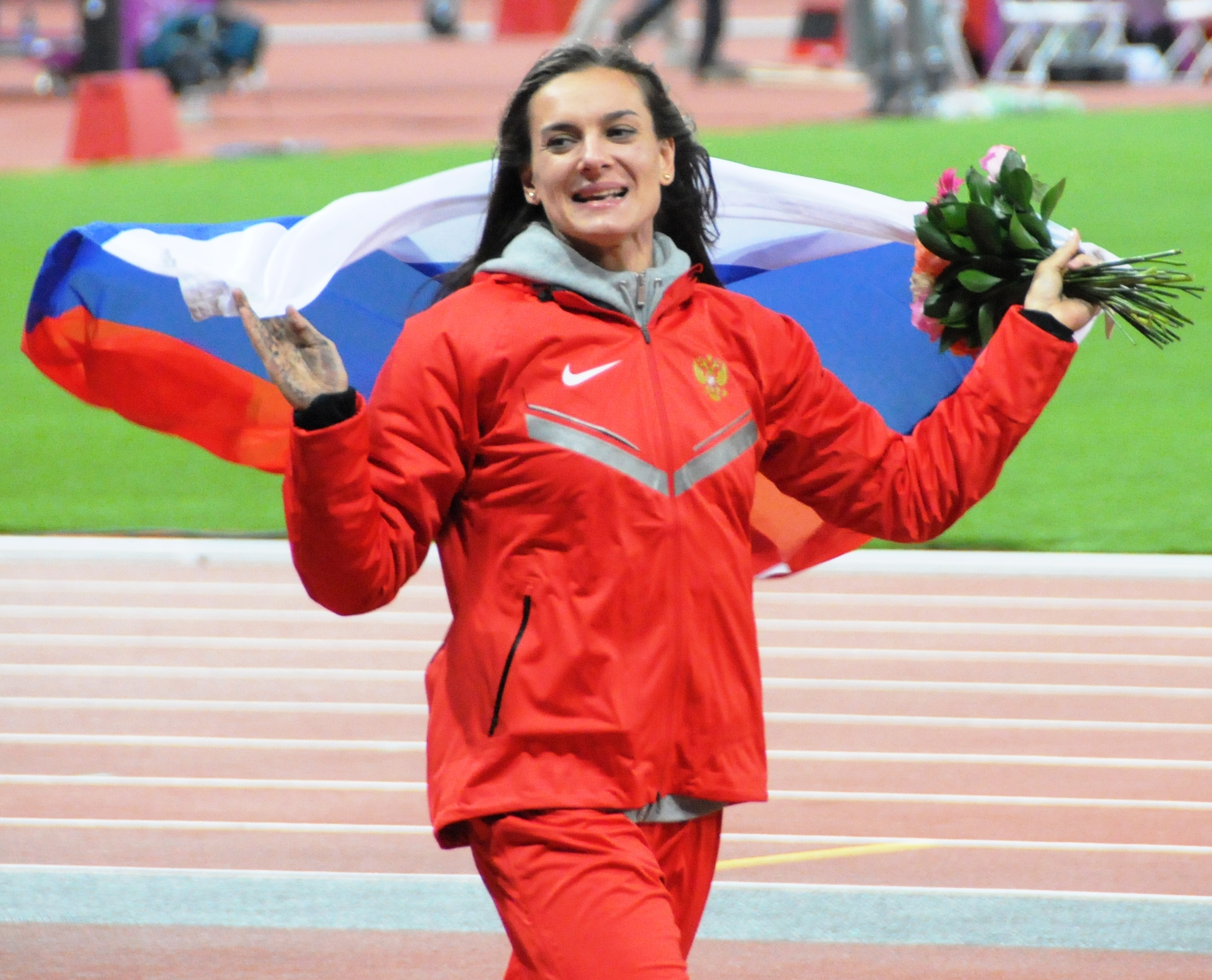
Yelena Isinbayeva's (RUS) who caused controversy

Russia's Yelena Isinbayeva was a popular winner in the women's pole vault, but later drew controversy for her remarks criticizing Green Tregaro's nails. She said the protests were disrespectful towards the host nation and commented in English: "We consider ourselves like normal, standard people, we just live boys with women, girls with boys...We have our law which everyone has to respect. When we go to different countries, we try to follow their rules." Following the negative reactions from other athletes and Western media she said that she had been misunderstood due to her grasp of English: "What I wanted to say was that people should respect the laws of other countries particularly when they are guests. But let me make it clear I respect the views of my fellow athletes, and let me state in the strongest terms that I am opposed to any discrimination against gay people on the grounds of their sexuality (which is against the Olympic Charter)."

During the medal ceremony for the women's 4 × 400 metres relay images of Kseniya Ryzhova and Yuliya Gushchina (Note: Several sources misidentified the pictures of Gushchina as fellow relay medallist Tatyana Firova.) sharing a kiss on the lips spread through social media and were interpreted as a protest against the anti-gay laws. Both Ryzhova and Gushchina denied any intention to make such a protest, rather they were simply happy with their athletic success, and stated that they were married to men. Although reports were principally focused on the pair, all four of the Russia relay runners briefly kissed each other on the podium. Ryzhova described her assumed connection to LGBT as insulting. The Russian Minister for Sport, Vitaly Mutko, said that Western media had overemphasised the issue, noting that same-sex relations are not illegal in Russia and sparser coverage of the issue in domestic media.

== Anti-doping ==
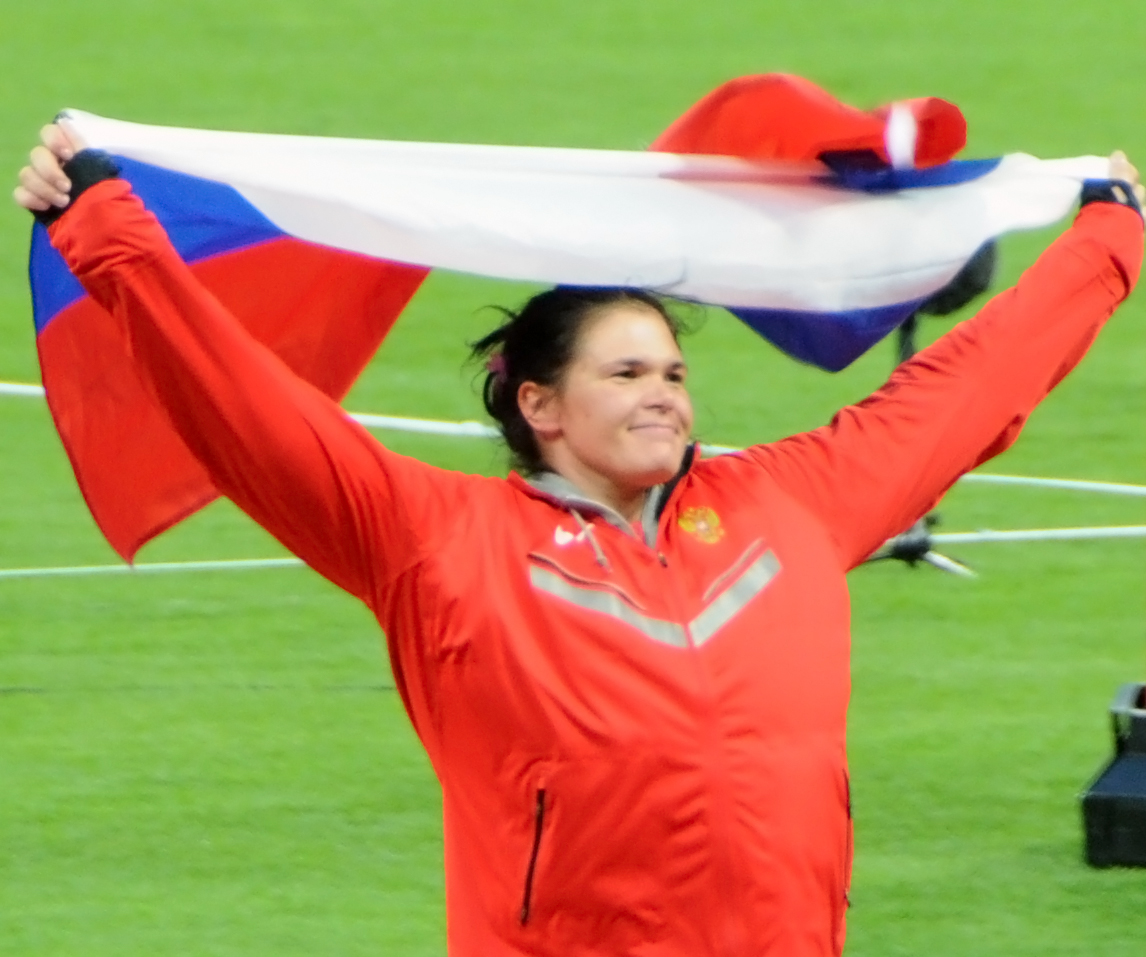
Russia's 2012 Olympic discus medallist Darya Pishchalnikova was among those banned for doping prior to the championships

At the championships the IAAF collected blood samples from all participating athletes, following the procedure introduced at the 2011 World Championships in Athletics, in line with supporting its Athlete Biological Passport programme. This assisted the federation in detecting athlete's potential usage of banned substances, including steroids, human growth hormone, EPO and blood doping. In addition to the mandatory blood tests, the IAAF also conducted around 500 urine tests at the championships in three groups: all medallists were subjected to urine tests, those showing biological passport anomalies were targeted, and random urine tests were also applied. Continuing with procedures initiated at the 2005 edition, all urine tests were scheduled for long-term storage to allow retrospective testing in future. All athlete samples were processed at the Moscow Anti-Doping Laboratory accredited by the World Anti-Doping Agency.

In the months preceding the event around 40 Russian athletes received doping bans. The most prominent of these were Darya Pishchalnikova (discus runner-up at the 2012 Summer Olympics) and Olga Kuzenkova (former Olympic and world champion in the hammer throw). The Russian Athletics Federation president Valentin Balakhnichev defended the bans as proof of the increasing effectiveness of RUSADA (the Russian Anti-Doping Agency) which had been formed three years before. According to The New York Times, Pishchalnikova was a whistleblower who sent the World Anti-Doping Agency (WADA) a December 2012 email detailing state-run doping programs in which Russian athletes had to participate; her ban by the Russian Athletics Federation was likely in retaliation.

A month before the competition it was reported that the head of the Moscow Anti-Doping Laboratory, Grigory Rodchenkov, had been arrested on charges of drug distribution, but the case against him had been dropped. His sister was convicted of purchasing banned drugs with the intention to supply them to athletes. Former Russian coach Oleg Popov and 400 metres runner Valentin Kruglyakov stated that athletes were ordered to dope and paid officials to conceal their positive tests. The coach of the national athletics team, Valentin Maslakov, noted that Kruglyakov had tested positive for drugs and that Popov coached Lada Chernova, who had twice tested positive. He also stated that RUSADA and its labs were independent from the national sports federations. On 18 November 2015, WADA suspended laboratory of RUSADA – Moscow Anti-Doping Laboratory, however the organization was not dissolved and tests are to be done by other independent labs.

In February 2016, two high-ranking directors of the organisation – Vyacheslav Sinyev and Nikita Kamayev – died. According to Sunday Times, Kamayev approached the news agency shortly before his death planning to publish a book on "the true story of sport pharmacology and doping in Russia since 1987".

Outside of Russia, three of the world's top sprinters had positive tests during the buildup: Asafa Powell, Tyson Gay and Veronica Campbell Brown.

The drug testing results from the competition revealed several athletes had been using performance-enhancing drugs. The fifth-place finisher in the men's javelin, Roman Avramenko of Ukraine, tested positive for 4-Chlorodehydromethyltestosterone (a steroid), as did Turkmenistan's Yelena Ryabova (a competitor in the women's 200 m). Another 200 m runner, Yelyzaveta Bryzgina, also of Ukraine, was banned for the steroid drostanolone. Afghan 100 m runner Masoud Azizi had nandrolone in his sample. Two athletes in the walking events, Ayman Kozhakhmetova and Ebrahim Rahimian, failed their tests for EPO, as did Guatemala's marathon runner Jeremias Saloj.

=== Russian doping scandal ===
Media attention began growing in December 2014 when German broadcaster ARD reported on state-sponsored doping in Russia, comparing it to doping in East Germany. In November 2015, the World Anti-Doping Agency (WADA) published a report and the International Association of Athletics Federations (IAAF) suspended Russia indefinitely from world track and field events. The 335-page report, compiled following a nearly yearlong investigation by a commission led by former anti-doping agency President Dick Pound, urged the International Association of Athletics Federations to suspend Russia from competition, including the Olympics in Brazil. The report said Russia "sabotaged" the 2012 Olympics by allowing athletes who should have been banned for doping violations to compete in the London Games. It recommended the anti-doping agency impose lifetime suspensions for 10 Russian coaches and athletes, including women's 800-meters gold medalist Mariya Savinova. The United Kingdom Anti-Doping agency later assisted WADA with testing in Russia. In June 2016, they reported that they were unable to fully carry out their work and noted intimidation by armed Federal Security Service (FSB) agents.

After a Russian former lab director made allegations about the 2014 Winter Olympics in Sochi, WADA commissioned an independent investigation led by Richard McLaren. McLaren's investigation found corroborating evidence, concluding in a report published in July 2016 that the Ministry of Sport and the FSB had operated a "state-directed failsafe system" using a "disappearing positive [test] methodology" (DPM) from "at least late 2011 to August 2015".

== Athlete desertion ==
Orlando Ortega, a Cuban athlete who competes in the 110 metres hurdles deserted his national delegation during the championships and did not return to Cuba at its conclusion. Ortega had received a six-month ban from the Cuban Athletics Federation earlier in the season for unspecified disciplinary reasons. Valentin Balakhnichev, the president of the Russian Athletics Federation, stated that he had had no contact from the athlete and in any case the federation was not looking to recruit him.

== See also ==
- Athletics at the 2012 Summer Olympics
- 2013 World Championships in Athletics qualification standards
