= 2013 World Championships in Athletics – Men's 4 × 400 metres relay =

Men's 4 × 400 metres relay at the 2013 World Championships
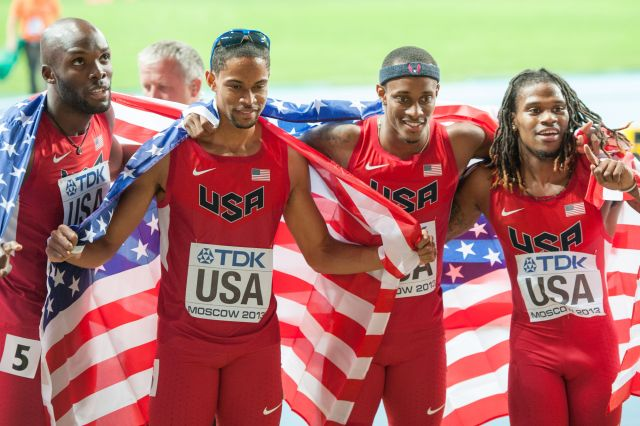
- Gold medal winners
- Venue: Luzhniki Stadium
- Dates: 15 (heats) & 16 August (final)
- Competitors: 96 from 24 nations
- Winning time: 2:58.71

Medalists
gold medal	United States; David Verburg; Tony McQuay; Arman Hall; LaShawn Merritt; James Harris†; Joshua Mance†
silver medal	Jamaica; Rusheen McDonald; Edino Steele; Omar Johnson; Javon Francis; Javere Bell†
bronze medal	DQ ~~Russia~~; ~~Maksim Dyldin~~; ~~Lev Mosin~~; ~~Sergey Petukhov~~; ~~Vladimir Krasnov~~; †indicates the runner only competed in the heats but still received a medal

The men's 4 × 400 metres relay at the 2013 World Championships in Athletics was held at the Luzhniki Stadium on 15–16 August.

The United States dominated, taking the lead from the start and never looking back, but not with the overwhelming show of force of some past championships. David Verburg passed first to silver medalist Tony McQuay who broke first and stayed out of traffic. Behind them, the race was quite competitive, with Russia's Maksim Dyldin closing the first lap in a rush then Lev Mosin running a strong curve to close off the break. Great Britain's Martyn Rooney had to go wide around the turn to pass the Russians, only to be passed himself by Belgium's Kevin Borlée. After Jonathan had led off, he passed to a third Borlée, Dylan. The team of brothers pulled to within two meters of the leading Americans with 500 meters to go, but then the gap widened to five meters. With gold medalist LaShawn Merritt pulling away, Russia's Vladimir Krasnov quickly passed Belgium's Will Oyowe at the handoff. Down the backstretch Jamaica's Javon Francis passed Great Britain, Belgium and Russia to move into second. Krasnov came back but Francis held him off at the line to take silver.

== Records ==
Prior to the competition, the records were as follows:

World record	United States (Andrew Valmon, Quincy Watts, Harry Reynolds, Michael Johnson)	2:54.29	Stuttgart, Germany	22 August 1993
Championship record	United States (Andrew Valmon, Quincy Watts, Harry Reynolds, Michael Johnson)	2:54.29	Stuttgart, Germany	22 August 1993
World Leading	United States (Torrin Lawrence, Manteo Mitchell, Bershawn Jackson, Tony McQuay)	3:00.91	Philadelphia, PA, United States	27 April 2013
African Record	Nigeria (Clement Chukwu, Jude Monye, Sunday Bada, Enefiok Udo-Obong)	2:58.68	Sydney, Australia	30 September 2000
Asian Record	Japan (Shunji Karube, Koji Ito, Jun Osakada, Shigekazu Omori)	3:00.76	Atlanta, GA, United States	3 August 1996
North, Central American and Caribbean record	United States (Andrew Valmon, Quincy Watts, Harry Reynolds, Michael Johnson)	2:54.29	Stuttgart, Germany	22 August 1993
South American Record	Brazil (Eronilde de Araújo, Cleverson da Silva, Claudinei da Silva, Sanderlei Parrela)	2:58.56	Winnipeg, Canada	30 July 1999
European Record	Great Britain (Iwan Thomas, Mark Richardson, Jamie Baulch, Roger Black)	2:56.60	Atlanta, GA, United States	3 August 1996
Oceanian record	Australia (Bruce Frayne, Gary Minihan, Richard Mitchell, Darren Clark)	2:59.70	Los Angeles, CA, United States	11 August 1984

== Qualification standards ==
A time	B time
3:05.00

== Schedule ==
Date	Time	Round
15 August 2013	19:05	Heats
16 August 2013	21:30	Final

All times are local times (UTC+4)

== Results ==
KEY:	q	Fastest non-qualifiers	Q	Qualified	NR	National record	PB	Personal best	SB	Seasonal best

=== Heats ===
Qualification: First 2 of each heat (Q) plus the 2 fastest times (q) advanced to the final.

Rank	Heat	Lane	Nation	Athletes	Time	Notes
1	2	4	United States	James Harris, David Verburg, Joshua Mance, Arman Hall	2:59.85	Q, WL
2	1	5	Jamaica	Rusheen McDonald, Javere Bell, Edino Steele, Javon Francis	3:00.41	Q
3	2	7	Trinidad and Tobago	Renny Quow, Jarrin Solomon, Lalonde Gordon, Deon Lendore	3:00.48	Q, SB
4	1	2	Great Britain & N.I.	Conrad Williams, Michael Bingham, Jamie Bowie, Martyn Rooney	3:00.50	Q, SB
5	2	5	Belgium	Antoine Gillet, Jonathan Borlée, Dylan Borlée, Kevin Borlée	3:00.81	q, SB
6	2	8	Brazil	Pedro Luiz de Oliveira, Wagner Cardoso, Anderson Henriques, Hugo de Sousa	3:01.09	q, SB
7	2	3	Poland	Kacper Kozłowski, Rafał Omelko, Łukasz Krawczuk, Marcin Marciniszyn	3:01.73	SB
8	3	6	Russia	Maksim Dyldin, Lev Mosin, Sergey Petukhov, Vladimir Krasnov	3:01.81	Q, SB
9	1	6	Venezuela	Arturo Ramírez, Alberto Aguilar, José Meléndez, Freddy Mezones	3:02.04	SB
10	1	7	Japan	Kengo Yamazaki, Yuzo Kanemaru, Hideyuki Hirose, Hiroyuki Nakano	3:02.43	SB
11	3	3	Australia	Steven Solomon, Craig Burns, Alexander Beck, Tristan Thomas	3:02.48	Q, SB
12	3	2	Germany	David Gollnow, Eric Krüger, Thomas Schneider, Jonas Plass	3:02.62	SB
13	3	7	Bahamas	Chris Brown, Wesley Neymour, LaToy Williams, O'Jay Ferguson	3:02.67	
14	1	8	Dominican Republic	Arismendy Peguero, Gustavo Cuesta, Yon Soriano, Luguelín Santos	3:03.61	
15	3	1	Italy	Marco Lorenzi, Isalbet Juarez, Eusebio Haliti, Matteo Galvan	3:03.88	SB
16	1	3	Spain	Roberto Briones, Samuel García, Mark Ujakpor, Pau Fradera	3:04.07	SB
17	3	4	Cuba	Yoandys Lescay, Raidel Acea, Orestes Rodríguez, Osmaidel Pellicier	3:04.26	
18	1	1	Nigeria	Noah Akwu, Abiola Onakoya, Tobi Ogunmola, Isah Salihu	3:04.52	
19	3	5	Czech Republic	Daniel Němeček, Pavel Maslák, Petr Lichý, Jan Tesař	3:04.54	SB
20	3	8	Saudi Arabia	Ismail Al-Sabani, Yousef Masrahi, Mohamed Ali Al-Bishi, Mohammed Al-Salhi	3:04.55	
21	2	6	Ukraine	Vitaliy Butrym, Myhaylo Knysh, Yevhen Hutsol, Volodymyr Burakov	3:04.98	SB
22	1	4	Botswana	Pako Seribe, Obakeng Ngwigwa, Isaac Makwala, Thapelo Ketlogetswe	3:05.74	SB
23	2	1	Kenya	Mike Mokamba Nyang'Au, Alphas Kishoyian, Anthony Chemut, Moses Kipkorir Kertich	3:06.29	SB
24	2	2	Sri Lanka	Priyashantha Dulan, Dilhan Aloka, Chanaka Kalawala, Kasun Kalhar Seneviratne	3:06.59	

=== Final ===
The final was started at 21:30.

Rank	Lane	Nation	Athletes	Time	Notes
1st place, gold medalist(s)	5	United States	David Verburg, Tony McQuay, Arman Hall, LaShawn Merritt	2:58.71	WL
2nd place, silver medalist(s)	4	Jamaica	Rusheen McDonald, Edino Steele, Omar Johnson, Javon Francis	2:59.88	SB
DQ	6	Russia	Maksim Dyldin, Lev Mosin, Sergey Petukhov, Vladimir Krasnov	~~2:59.90~~	SB
3	7	Great Britain & N.I.	Conrad Williams, Martyn Rooney, Michael Bingham, Nigel Levine	3:00.88	
4	1	Belgium	Jonathan Borlée, Kevin Borlée, Dylan Borlée, Will Oyowe	3:01.02	
5	3	Trinidad and Tobago	Renny Quow, Lalonde Gordon, Jehue Gordon, Jarrin Solomon	3:01.74	
6	2	Brazil	Pedro Luiz de Oliveira, Wagner Cardoso, Anderson Henriques, Hugo de Sousa	3:02.19	
7	8	Australia	Steven Solomon, Alexander Beck, Craig Burns, Tristan Thomas	3:02.26	SB
