= Sergey Petukhov (sprinter) =

Russian sprinter

Personal information
- Nationality: Russian
- Born: 22 December 1983 (age 42)

Sport
- Country: Russia
- Sport: Men's athletics
- Event: 400m
Medal record
World Championships
Disqualified	2013 Moscow	4 × 400 m

Sergey Petukhov (born 22 December 1983) is a Russian sprinter. He competed in the 4x400 metres relay event at the 2013 World Championships in Athletics.
