= Omar Johnson =

Jamaican sprinter

Personal information
- Nationality: Jamaican
- Born: 25 November 1988 (age 37)

Sport
- Sport: Track and field
- Event: 400m
Medal record
Men's athletics
Representing Jamaica
World Championships
Silver medal – second place	2013 Moscow	4×400 m relay

Omar Johnson (born 25 November 1988) is a Jamaican sprinter. He competed in the 4x400 metres relay event at the 2013 World Championships in Athletics, winning a silver medal.
