= Netherlands at the 2013 World Championships in Athletics =

- WA code: NED

in Moscow
- Competitors: 23
- Medals: Gold 0 Silver 1 Bronze 1 Total 2

World Championships in Athletics appearances
- 1976; 1980; 1983; 1987; 1991; 1993; 1995; 1997; 1999; 2001; 2003; 2005; 2007; 2009; 2011; 2013; 2015; 2017; 2019; 2022; 2023; 2025

Netherlands competed at the 2013 World Championships in Athletics in Moscow, Russia, from 10–18 August 2013. A team of 23 athletes was announced to represent the country in the event.

Dafne Schippers won with her bronze in the women's heptathlon the first women's medal for the Netherlands at the World Championships in Athletics in history.

== Medallists ==
The following Dutch competitors won medals at the Championships

Medal	Name	Event	Date
Bronze	Dafne Schippers	Heptathlon	13 August
Silver	Ignisious Gaisah	Long jump	16 August

== Results ==
(q – qualified, NM – no mark, SB – season best)

=== Men ===
Track and road events

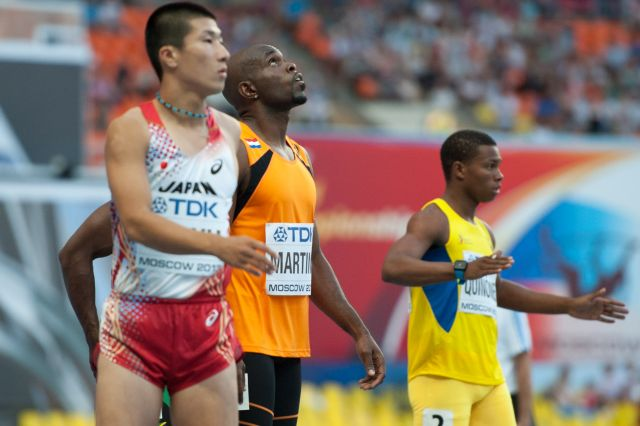
Churandy Martina (centre) before the heats of the men's 100 metres .

Athlete	Event	Preliminaries		Heats		Semifinals		Final	
Athlete	Event	Time	Rank	Time	Rank	Time	Rank	Time	Rank
Churandy Martina	100 metres			10.17	16 Q	10.09	12	did not advance	
Churandy Martina	200 metres			20.37	4 Q	20.12	6 q	20.35	7
Gregory Sedoc	110 metres hurdle			13.50 SB	15 q	13.54	13	did not advance	
Liemarvin Bonevacia; Jerrel Feller; Brian Mariano; Churandy Martina; Hensley Paulina; Jorén Tromp	4 × 100 metres relay			38.41 SB	8 q			38.37 SB	5
Michel Butter	Marathon							did not finish	

Field events

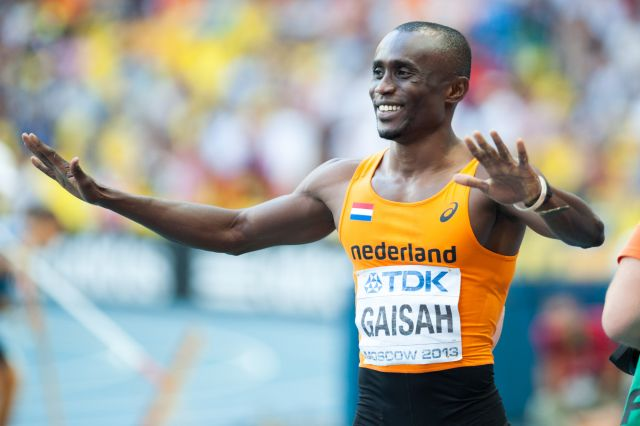
Ignisious Gaisah won the silver medal in the men's long jump.

Athlete	Event	Preliminaries		Final	
Athlete	Event	Width Height	Rank	Width Height	Rank
Ignisious Gaisah	Long jump	7.89 q	12	8.29 NR	2nd place, silver medalist(s)
Douwe Amels	High jump	2.17	25	did not advance	
Erik Cadee	Discus throw	62.14	14	did not advance	

Decathlon

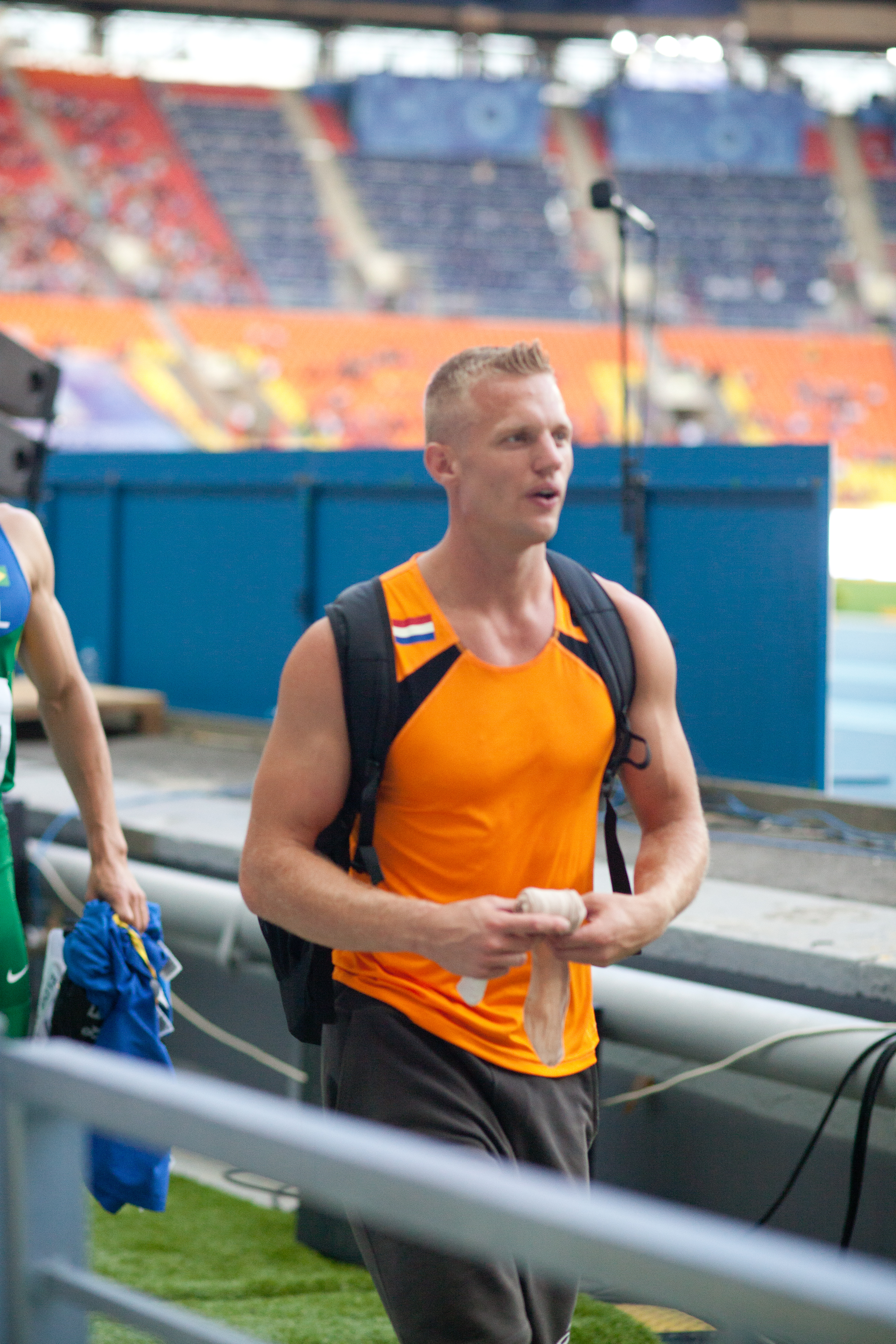
Pelle Rietveld.

Pelle Rietveld	Decathlon			
Pelle Rietveld	Event	Results	Points	Rank
	100 m	11.15	827	22
	Long jump	6.68	739	31
	Shot put	13.21	680	28
	High jump	1.90 SB	714	26
	400 m	48.67	877	12
	110 m hurdles	14.37	927	11
	Discus throw	38.06	625	26
	Pole vault	5.10 PB	941	5
	Javelin throw	64.38	804	12
	1500 m	4:35.94 SB	706	15
Total			7840 SB	21

Ingmar Vos	Decathlon			
Ingmar Vos	Event	Results	Points	Rank
	100 m	10.85 SB	897	15
	Long jump	7.45 SB	922	10
	Shot put	13.81	717	23
	High jump	2.05 SB	850	6
	400 m	51.02	768	26
	110 m hurdles	DQ	0	-
	Discus throw	42.77	721	18
	Pole vault	XR	0	-
	Javelin throw	62.10 PB	769	14
	1500 m	DNS	0	-
Total			DNF	-

Eelco Sintnicolaas	Decathlon			
Eelco Sintnicolaas	Event	Results	Points	Rank
	100 m	10.85	894	9
	Long jump	7.65 PB	972	4
	Shot put	14.08	773	17
	High jump	2.02	822	12
	400 m	48.25	897	6
	110 m hurdles	14.18	951	5
	Discus throw	39.21	649	24
	Pole vault	5.30	1004	2
	Javelin throw	56.75 SB	689	23
	1500 m	4:24.64 SB	780	5
Total			8391 SB	5

=== Women ===
Track and road events

Athlete	Event	Preliminaries		Heats		Semifinals		Final	
Athlete	Event	Time	Rank	Time	Rank	Time	Rank	Time	Rank
Dafne Schippers	100 metres			did not start		did not advance			
Dafne Schippers	200 metres			did not start		did not advance			
Maureen Koster	1500 metres			4:08.99	21 q	4:08.15	17	did not advance	
Susan Kuijken	1500 metres			did not start		did not advance			
Susan Kuijken	5000 metres			15:34.31	7 q			15:14.70	8
Dafne Schippers; Madiea Ghafoor; Jamile Samuel; Nicky van Leuveren; Tessa van Schagen; Kadene Vassell	4 × 100 metres relay			43.26 SB	13			did not advance	

Heptathlon

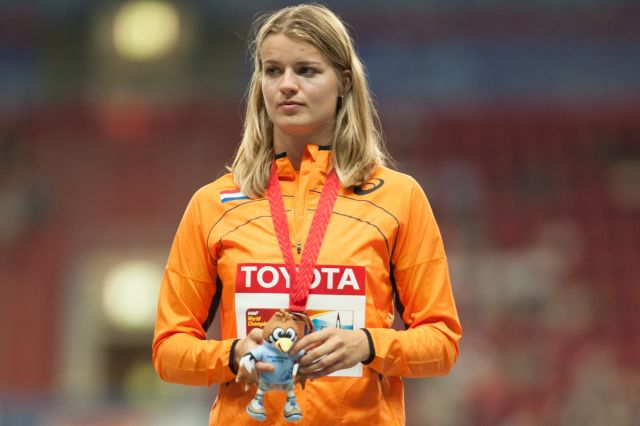
Dafne Schippers won bronze in the women's heptathlon. The first women's medal for the Netherlands at World Championships in Athletics in history.

Nadine Broersen	Heptathlon			
Nadine Broersen	Event	Results	Points	Rank
	100 m hurdles	14.84	863	33
	High jump	1.89	1093	2
	Shot put	13.46	758	13
	200 m	25.01 PB	886	19
	Long jump	6.13	890	10
	Javelin throw	47.48	811	7
	800 m	2:12.89	923	12
Total			6224	10

Dafne Schippers	Heptathlon			
Dafne Schippers	Event	Results	Points	Rank
	100 m hurdles	13.30 SB	1080	3
	High jump	1.77 SB	941	18
	Shot put	12.91	721	19
	200 m	22.84 SB	1095	1
	Long jump	6.35	959	5
	Javelin throw	41.47 PB	696	18
	800 m	2:08.62 PB	985	4
Total			6477 NR	3rd place, bronze medalist(s)

== See also ==
Netherlands at other World Championships in 2013

- Netherlands at the 2013 UCI Road World Championships
- Netherlands at the 2013 World Aquatics Championships
