= France at the 2013 World Championships in Athletics =

- WA code: FRA

in Moscow
- Competitors: 52
- Medals: Gold 1 Silver 2 Bronze 1 Total 4

World Championships in Athletics appearances
- 1976; 1980; 1983; 1987; 1991; 1993; 1995; 1997; 1999; 2001; 2003; 2005; 2007; 2009; 2011; 2013; 2015; 2017; 2019; 2022; 2023; 2025

France competed at the 2013 World Championships in Athletics in Moscow, Russia, from 10 to 18 August 2013. A team of 52 athlete was announced to represent the country in the event.

== Medalists ==
The following competitors from France won medals at the Championships

Medal	Athlete	Event
Gold	Teddy Tamgho	Triple jump
Silver	Mélina Robert-Michon	Discus throw
Silver	Renaud Lavillenie	Pole vault
Bronze	Mahiedine Mekhissi-Benabbad	3000 metres Steeplechase

== Results ==
(Q/q – Qualified, NM – No Mark, DNS - Did Not Start, DNF - Did Not Finish, DSQ - Disqualified, SB – Season Best, PB - Personal Best, NR - national record)

All the following results came from the official website of the 2013 World Championships.

=== Men ===
Track and road events

Athlete	Event	Heats		Semifinals		Final	
Athlete	Event	Time	Rank	Time	Rank	Time	Rank
Christophe Lemaitre	100 metres	10.12	9 Q	10.00 SB	8 q	10.06	7
Jimmy Vicaut	100 metres	10.06	6 Q	10.01	10		
Christophe Lemaitre	200 metres	DNS	-				
Jimmy Vicaut	200 metres	20.50	11 Q	20.51	14		
Pierre-Ambroise Bosse	800 metres	1:47.70	26 Q	1:44.75	5 Q	1:44.79	7
Florian Carvalho	1500 metres	3:38.70	11 Q	3:36.26	4 Q	3:39.17	11
Bouabdellah Tahri	1500 metres	3:38.82	13 q	3:44.24	20		
Simon Denissel	1500 metres	3:42.06	31				
Pascal Martinot-Lagarde	110 metres hurdle	13.63	22				
Thomas Martinot-Lagarde	110 metres hurdle	13.33	5 Q	13.39	8 Q	13.42	7
Yoann Decimus	400 metres hurdles	50.21	25				
Mickaël François	400 metres hurdles	50.02	22 Q	50.58	22		
Yoann Kowal	3000 metres steeplechase	8:23.74	9 Q			8:17.41	8
Mahiedine Mekhissi-Benabbad	3000 metres steeplechase	8:15.43	1 Q			8:07.86	3rd place, bronze medalist(s)
Noureddine Smail	3000 metres steeplechase	8:24.05	12 Q			DNF	-
David Alerte; Emmanuel Biron; Christophe Lemaitre; Arnaud Remy; Jimmy Vicaut; Mickael-Meba Zeze	4 × 100 metres relay	38.97	17				
Benjamin Malaty	Marathon					2:19:21	28
Kevin Campion	20 kilometres walk					NM	DNF
Bertrand Moulinet	20 kilometres walk					1:26:12 SB	29
Yohann Diniz	50 kilometres walk					3:45:18	10

Field events

Athlete	Event	Preliminaries		Final	
Athlete	Event	Width Height	Rank	Width Height	Rank
Salim Sdiri	Long jump	7.64	21		
Yoann Rapinier	Triple jump	17.39	2 Q	15.17	12
Gaëtan Saku Bafuanga Baya	Triple jump	16.63	12 q	16.79	7
Teddy Tamgho	Triple jump	17.41	1 Q	18.04 NR	1st place, gold medalist(s)
Mickael Hanany	High jump	2.26	14		
Valentin Lavillenie	Pole vault	5.55	11 q	NM	-
Renaud Lavillenie	Pole vault	5.65	1 q	5.89	2nd place, silver medalist(s)
Quentin Bigot	Hammer throw	74.98	13		

Decathlon

Kevin Mayer	Decathlon			
Kevin Mayer	Event	Results	Points	Rank
	100 m	11.23	810	28
	Long jump	7.50	935	9
	Shot put	13.76	714	24
	High jump	2.05 SB	850	9
	400 m	49.53	836	18
	110 m hurdles	14.21 PB	948	6
	Discus throw	45.37 PB	774	9
	Pole vault	5.20 PB	972	4
	Javelin throw	66.09 PB	830	6
	1500 m	4:25.04	777	6
Total			8446 PB	4

Gaël Querin	Decathlon			
Gaël Querin	Event	Results	Points	Rank
	100 m	11.19	819	23
	Long jump	7.18	857	25
	Shot put	13.03	669	30
	High jump	1.90	714	25
	400 m	48.78	872	13
	110 m hurdles	14.87	865	20
	Discus throw	38.34	631	25
	Pole vault	NM	0	-
	Javelin throw	50.66	598	27
	1500 m	4:18.58	821	1
Total			6846	25

=== Women ===
Track and road events

Athlete	Event	Heats		Semifinals		Final	
Athlete	Event	Time	Rank	Time	Rank	Time	Rank
Stella Akakpo	100 metres	11.43	25				
Myriam Soumare	100 metres	11.34	20 q	11.31	13		
Johanna Danois	200 metres	23.00	17 Q	23.15	18		
Lénora Guion-Firmin	200 metres	22.91 SB	15 Q	23.11	16		
Myriam Soumare	200 metres	22.83 SB	9 Q	22.85	11		
Marie Gayot	400 metres	51.83	16 Q	51.54 PB	14		
Floria Gueï	400 metres	51.75	15 Q	51.42 PB	12		
Sophie Duarte	5000 metres	16:05.14	17				
Christelle Daunay	10,000 metres					32:04.44	10
Cindy Billaud	100 metres hurdle	12.71	3 Q	12.78	8 q	12.84	7
Reïna-Flor Okori	100 metres hurdle	13.01	11 Q	13.15	21		
Phara Anacharsis	400 metres hurdles	56.73	20				
Stella Akakpo; Johanna Danois; Ayodelé Ikuesan; Myriam Soumare; Émilie Gaydu; Céline Distel-Bonnet	4 × 100 metres relay	42.25 SB	3			DSQ	-
Phara Anacharsis; Marie Gayot; Floria Gueï; Lénora Guion-Firmin; Muriel Hurtis	4 × 400 metres relay	3:27.75	5			3:24.21 SB	4
Carmen Oliveras	Marathon					2:48:58	33

Field events

Athlete	Event	Preliminaries		Final	
Athlete	Event	Width Height	Rank	Width Height	Rank
Éloyse Lesueur	Long jump	6.39	22		
Marion Lotout	Pole vault	4.55	9 q	4.45	12
Mélina Robert-Michon	Discus throw	63.16	5 Q	66.28 NR	2nd place, silver medalist(s)

Heptathlon

Antoinette Nana Djimou Ida	Heptathlon			
Antoinette Nana Djimou Ida	Event	Results	Points	Rank
	100 m hurdles	13.36 SB	1071	4
	High jump	1.77 SB	941	19
	Shot put	14.54	830	2
	200 m	24.95	891	17
	Long jump	5.97	840	19
	Javelin throw	52.47	908	2
	800 m	2:18.44	845	25
Total			6326 SB	8
