= 2013 World Championships in Athletics – Men's 200 metres =

Men's 200 metres at the 2013 World Championships
- Venue: Luzhniki Stadium
- Dates: 16 August (heats & semifinals); 17 August (final)
- Competitors: 55 from 41 nations
- Winning time: 19.66

Medalists
gold medal	Usain Bolt; Jamaica
silver medal	Warren Weir; Jamaica
bronze medal	Curtis Mitchell; United States

Official Video

The men's 200 metres at the 2013 World Championships in Athletics was held at the Luzhniki Stadium on 16 and 17 August. The winning margin was 0.13 seconds.

In the final, Adam Gemili seemed to get the best start, but flanked by the Jamaican uniforms, he was quickly swallowed up. Midway into the turn, Usain Bolt had a clear lead. Coming off the turn, Bolt had several meters on the field. The winner determined, Bolt eased off and cruised across the finish in what would be a great time for any other human being, just a slow 200 for Bolt in 19.66. Coming off the turn about even with Gemili and Nickel Ashmeade, Warren Weir out in lane 8 separated from those two and gained significantly on the slowing Bolt, setting a personal best of 19.79. Taking a lesson from American teammate Wallace Spearmon who was vanquished in the semis, Curtis Mitchell spotted the field several meters then closed from last position at the end of the turn to take the bronze. Gemili took a full dive at the finish to try to beat Ashmeade but still finished in fifth.

== Records ==
Prior to the competition, the records were as follows:

World record	Usain Bolt (JAM)	19.19	Berlin, Germany	20 August 2009
Championship record	Usain Bolt (JAM)	19.19	Berlin, Germany	20 August 2009
World Leading	Usain Bolt (JAM)	19.73	Saint-Denis, France	6 July 2013
African Record	Frankie Fredericks (NAM)	19.68	Atlanta, GA, United States	1 August 1996
Asian Record	Shingo Suetsugu (JPN)	20.03	Yokohama, Japan	7 June 2003
North, Central American and Caribbean record	Usain Bolt (JAM)	19.19	Berlin, Germany	20 August 2009
South American Record	Alonso Edward (PAN)	19.81	Berlin, Germany	20 August 2009
European Record	Pietro Mennea (ITA)	19.72A	Mexico City, Mexico	12 September 1979
Oceanian record	Peter Norman (AUS)	20.06A	Mexico City, Mexico	15 October 1968

== Qualification standards ==
A time	B time
20.52	20.60

== Schedule ==
Date	Time	Round
16 August 2013	10:35	Heats
16 August 2013	19:40	Semifinals
17 August 2013	20:05	Final

All times are local times (UTC+4)

== Results ==
KEY:	q	Fastest non-qualifiers	Q	Qualified	NR	National record	PB	Personal best	SB	Seasonal best

=== Heats ===
Qualification: First 3 in each heat (Q) and the next 3 fastest (q) advanced to the semifinals.

Wind: Heat 1: −0.4 m/s, Heat 2: −0.2 m/s, Heat 3: 0.0 m/s, Heat 4: −0.7 m/s, Heat 5: −0.6 m/s, Heat 6: +0.2 m/s, Heat 7: +0.2 m/s.

Rank	Heat	Lane	Name	Nationality	Time	Notes
1	2	7	Anaso Jobodwana	South Africa	20.17	Q
1	6	7	Adam Gemili	Great Britain & N.I.	20.17	Q, PB
3	3	6	Warren Weir	Jamaica	20.34	Q
4	2	3	Churandy Martina	Netherlands	20.37	Q
4	1	2	Curtis Mitchell	United States	20.37	Q
6	1	7	Jaysuma Saidy Ndure	Norway	20.44	Q
7	4	8	Alonso Edward	Panama	20.45	Q
8	2	8	Mosito Lehata	Lesotho	20.46	Q
9	2	6	Álex Quiñónez	Ecuador	20.47	q
9	3	4	Bruno Hortelano	Spain	20.47	Q, NR
11	3	3	Jimmy Vicaut	France	20.50	Q
12	1	5	Serhiy Smelyk	Ukraine	20.52	Q, PB
13	4	5	Nickel Ashmeade	Jamaica	20.54	Q
14	1	6	Lykourgos-Stefanos Tsakonas	Greece	20.55	q
14	5	7	James Ellington	Great Britain & N.I.	20.55	Q
16	4	7	Antoine Adams	Saint Kitts and Nevis	20.56	Q
17	5	2	Jason Livermore	Jamaica	20.59	Q
17	5	4	Wallace Spearmon	United States	20.59	Q
19	5	6	Karol Zalewski	Poland	20.60	q
19	3	7	Bruno de Barros	Brazil	20.60	
21	7	6	Usain Bolt	Jamaica	20.66	Q
22	2	4	Tremaine Harris	Canada	20.68	
23	6	6	Isiah Young	United States	20.70	Q
24	6	3	Shōta Iizuka	Japan	20.71	Q
25	7	4	Delano Williams	Great Britain & N.I.	20.72	Q
26	4	4	Aldemir da Silva Junior	Brazil	20.73	
27	5	5	Xie Zhenye	China	20.74	
28	1	4	Isaac Makwala	Botswana	20.84	
29	7	7	Lalonde Gordon	Trinidad and Tobago	20.85	Q
30	6	5	Winston George	Guyana	20.88	
30	6	4	Sergio Ruiz	Spain	20.88	
32	1	8	Kyle Greaux	Trinidad and Tobago	20.89	
33	3	2	Kei Takase	Japan	20.96	
34	4	3	Nil de Oliveira	Sweden	20.97	
34	7	3	Yuichi Kobayashi	Japan	20.97	
36	5	8	Rolando Palacios	Honduras	21.02	SB
37	7	2	Alex Wilson	Switzerland	21.11	
38	5	3	Luguelín Santos	Dominican Republic	21.13	
38	6	2	Enrico Demonte	Italy	21.13	
40	2	5	Ratu Banuve Tabakaucoro	Fiji	21.27	
41	1	3	Hitjivirue Kaanjuka	Namibia	21.33	
42	7	5	Jan Žumer	Slovenia	21.35	
43	3	1	Lestrod Roland	Saint Kitts and Nevis	21.37	
44	7	1	Jamial Rolle	Bahamas	21.40	
45	2	1	Josh Ross	Australia	21.45	
46	4	1	Aleksandr Khyutte	Russia	21.46	
47	4	2	Yendountien Tiebekabe	Togo	21.85	
48	2	2	Liaquat Ali	Pakistan	21.90	
49	1	1	Neddy Marie	Seychelles	21.98	SB
49	5	1	Courtney Carl Williams	Saint Vincent and the Grenadines	21.98	
51	3	5	Mitchel Davis	Dominica	21.99	SB
52	7	8	Didier Kiki	Benin	22.01	PB
53	6	8	Ayman Mohamed Ahmed Said	Egypt	22.27	
54	3	8	Bernardo Baloyes	Colombia	22.37	
55	6	1	Jerai Torres	Gibraltar	22.98	
	4	6	Hua Wilfried Koffi	Ivory Coast	DNS	

=== Semifinals ===
Qualification: First 2 in each heat (Q) and the next 2 fastest (q) advanced to the final.

Wind: Heat 1: 0.0 m/s, Heat 2: 0.0 m/s, Heat 3: −0.3 m/s.

Rank	Heat	Lane	Name	Nationality	Time	Notes
1	1	5	Curtis Mitchell	United States	19.97	Q, PB
2	3	6	Adam Gemili	Great Britain & N.I.	19.98	Q, PB
3	3	4	Nickel Ashmeade	Jamaica	20.00	Q, SB
4	2	4	Usain Bolt	Jamaica	20.12	Q
5	2	3	Anaso Jobodwana	South Africa	20.13	Q, PB
6	3	5	Churandy Martina	Netherlands	20.13	q
7	1	3	Warren Weir	Jamaica	20.20	Q
8	1	4	Jaysuma Saidy Ndure	Norway	20.33	q, SB
9	2	8	Isiah Young	United States	20.36	
10	3	7	Serhiy Smelyk	Ukraine	20.42	PB
11	2	6	James Ellington	Great Britain & N.I.	20.44	
12	2	5	Jason Livermore	Jamaica	20.46	
13	2	7	Antoine Adams	Saint Kitts and Nevis	20.47	
14	1	7	Jimmy Vicaut	France	20.51	
15	1	1	Álex Quiñónez	Ecuador	20.55	
16	1	6	Bruno Hortelano	Spain	20.55	
17	3	2	Lykourgos-Stefanos Tsakonas	Greece	20.56	
18	1	8	Delano Williams	Great Britain & N.I.	20.61	
19	2	1	Shōta Iizuka	Japan	20.61	
20	2	2	Karol Zalewski	Poland	20.66	
21	3	1	Wallace Spearmon	United States	20.66	
22	3	3	Alonso Edward	Panama	20.67	
23	3	8	Mosito Lehata	Lesotho	20.68	
24	1	2	Lalonde Gordon	Trinidad and Tobago	21.14	

=== Final ===
The final was started at 20:10.

Rank	Lane	Name	Nationality	Time	Notes
1st place, gold medalist(s)	4	Usain Bolt	Jamaica	19.66	WL
2nd place, silver medalist(s)	8	Warren Weir	Jamaica	19.79	PB
3rd place, bronze medalist(s)	3	Curtis Mitchell	United States	20.04	
4	6	Nickel Ashmeade	Jamaica	20.05	
5	5	Adam Gemili	Great Britain & N.I.	20.08	
6	7	Anaso Jobodwana	South Africa	20.14	
7	1	Churandy Martina	Netherlands	20.35	
8	2	Jaysuma Saidy Ndure	Norway	20.37	

- By winning this 200m final, Usain Bolt became the first man ever to retain the 200m world title three times in a row (winning the title in 2009, in 19.19, and 2011, in 19.40). Calvin Smith and Michael Johnson both won the title twice (in 1983 and 1987, and in 1991 and 1995, respectively) yet only Bolt has retained the title three times (2009, 2011 and 2013).
