= Trinidad and Tobago at the 2013 World Championships in Athletics =

- WA code: TRI

in Moscow
- Competitors: 21
- Medals: Gold 0 Silver 0 Bronze 0 Total 0

World Championships in Athletics appearances
- 1983; 1987; 1991; 1993; 1995; 1997; 1999; 2001; 2003; 2005; 2007; 2009; 2011; 2013; 2015; 2017; 2019; 2022; 2023

Trinidad and Tobago competed at the 2013 World Championships in Athletics in Moscow, Russia, from 10–18 August 2013. A team of 21 athletes was announced to represent the country in the event.

== Results ==
(q – qualified, NM – no mark, SB – season best)

=== Men ===
Track and road events

Athlete	Event	Preliminaries		Heats		Semifinals		Final	
Athlete	Event	Time	Rank	Time	Rank	Time	Rank	Time	Rank
Keston Bledman	100 metres								
Rondel Sorrillo	100 metres								
Richard Thompson	100 metres								
Lalonde Gordon	200 metres								
Kyle Greaux	200 metres								
Deon Lendore	400 metres								
Jarrin Solomon	400 metres								
Wayne C. Davis II	110 metres hurdle								
Mikel Thomas	110 metres hurdle								
Jehue Gordon	400 metres hurdles								
Keston Bledman; Emmanuel Callender; Jamol James; Rondel Sorrillo; Ayodele Taffe; Richard Thompson	4 × 100 metres relay								
Machel Cedenio; Lalonde Gordon; Jehue Gordon; Deon Lendore; Renny Quow; Jarrin Solomon	4 × 400 metres relay								

Field events

Athlete	Event	Preliminaries		Final	
Athlete	Event	Width Height	Rank	Width Height	Rank
Keshorn Walcott	Javelin throw				

=== Women ===
Track and road events

Athlete	Event	Preliminaries		Heats		Semifinals		Final	
Athlete	Event	Time	Rank	Time	Rank	Time	Rank	Time	Rank
Michelle-Lee Ahye	100 metres								
Kelly-Ann Baptiste	100 metres								
Semoy Hackett	100 metres								
Kai Selvon	100 metres								
Michelle-Lee Ahye	200 metres								
Kelly-Ann Baptiste	200 metres								
Semoy Hackett	200 metres								
Kai Selvon	200 metres								
Sparkle McKnight	400 metres								
Aleesha Barber	100 metres hurdle								
Sparkle McKnight	400 metres hurdles								
Michelle-Lee Ahye; Kelly-Ann Baptiste; Kamaria Durant; Semoy Hackett; Kai Selvon; Reyare Thomas	4 × 100 metres relay								
Alena Brooks; Shawna Fermin; Sparkle McKnight; Romona Modeste; Kai Selvon; Domonique Williams	4 × 400 metres relay								

Field events

Athlete	Event	Preliminaries		Final	
Athlete	Event	Width Height	Rank	Width Height	Rank
Cleopatra Borel	Shot put				
