= Montserrat at the World Athletics Championships =

- WA code: MNT
- National federation: Montserrat Amateur Athletics Association
- Medals: Gold 0 Silver 0 Bronze 0 Total 0

World Athletics Championships appearances (overview)
- 1983; 1987; 1991; 1993; 1995; 1997; 1999; 2001; 2003–2005; 2007; 2009–2011; 2013; 2015; 2017; 2019–2023; 2025

Montserrat has competed at 11 editions of the World Athletics Championships. The nation was represented at all eight of the first championships until 2001, and then competed at the 2007, 2013, and 2015 editions. As of 2023, their highest men's and women's placings were by Oswald Philip who placed 24th in the 1983 men's triple jump qualification and by Magdalene Springer, who placed 20th in the 1983 women's shot put qualification.

Montserrat holds the record of the youngest World Championships competitor in the men's 100 metres, with Darren Tuitt competing at the 2015 championships at only 15 years and 153 days old.

The Montserrat Amateur Athletics Association was founded in 1971 and it became a member of World Athletics in 1974. The country does not have a National Olympic Committee.

== Performances ==
(q – qualified, NM – no mark, SB – season best)

=== 2005 ===
Athlete	Event	Heats		Semifinals		Final	
Athlete	Event	Time	Rank	Time	Rank	Time	Rank
Philam Garcia	men's 100 metres	10.79	39	did not advance			

=== 2013 ===
The 2013 World Championships in Athletics were held in Moscow, Russia, from 10 to 18 August 2013. A team of one athlete was announced to represent the country in the event.

==== Results ====
===== Men =====
Athlete	Event	Preliminaries		Heats		Semifinals		Final	
Athlete	Event	Time	Rank	Time	Rank	Time	Rank	Time	Rank
Shernyl Burns	100 metres			10.69	51	did not advance			

=== 2015 ===
The 2015 World Championships in Athletics was held in Beijing, China, from 22 to 30 August 2015.

==== Results ====
===== Men =====
Track and road events

Athlete	Event	Heat		Semifinal		Final	
Athlete	Event	Result	Rank	Result	Rank	Result	Rank
Julius Morris	200 metres	20.56	35	did not advance			

=== 2017 ===
The 2017 World Championships in Athletics were held in London, United Kingdom, from 4–13 August 2017. Montserrat was represented by one male athlete, sprinter Julius Morris, who qualified for the 200 metres event. An injury sustained during training however, forced Morris to withdraw from the event.

==== Results ====
===== Men =====
Track and road events

Athlete	Event	Heat		Semifinal		Final	
Athlete	Event	Result	Rank	Result	Rank	Result	Rank
Julius Morris	200 metres	DNS	–	Did not advance			
