= Sweden at the 2013 World Championships in Athletics =

- WA code: SWE
- National federation: Svenska Friidrottsförbundet
- Website: www.friidrott.se

in Moscow
- Competitors: 23
- Medals Ranked 12th: Gold 1 Silver 0 Bronze 0 Total 1

World Championships in Athletics appearances (overview)
- 1976; 1980; 1983; 1987; 1991; 1993; 1995; 1997; 1999; 2001; 2003; 2005; 2007; 2009; 2011; 2013; 2015; 2017; 2019; 2022; 2023; 2025

Sweden competed at the 2013 World Championships in Athletics in Moscow, Russia, from 10 to 18 August 2013. Isabellah Andersson (marathon), Ebba Jungmark (high jump) and Jessica Samuelsson (heptathlon) were all selected to compete, but withdrew due to different causes.

== Medallists ==
| Medal | Name | Event | Date |
|---|---|---|---|
| Gold | Abeba Aregawi | 1500 metres | 15 August |

== Results ==
=== Men ===
Track and road events

| Athlete | Event | Heat | | Semifinal | | Final | |
| Athlete | Event | Result | Rank | Result | Rank | Result | Rank |
|---|---|---|---|---|---|---|---|
| Nil de Oliveira | 200 metres | 20.97 | 34 | Did not advance | | | |
| Mustafa Mohamed | Marathon | | | | | 2:17:09 | 22 |
| Philip Nossmy | 110 m hurdles | 13.66 | 23 | Did not advance | | | |
| Ato Ibáñes | 20 km walk | | | | | 1:24.49 | 23 |
| Perseus Karlström | 20 km walk | | | | | 1:28.20 | 38 |
| Andreas Gustafsson | 50 km walk | | | | | 4:01:40 | 39 |
| Ato Ibáñes | 50 km walk | | | | | 3:53:38 | 22 |

Field events

| Athlete | Event | Qualification | | Final | |
| Athlete | Event | Distance | Position | Distance | Position |
|---|---|---|---|---|---|
| Alhaji Jeng | Pole vault | 5.55 | 7 q | 5.65 | 9 |
| Michel Tornéus | Long jump | 7.75 | 19 | Did not advance | |
| Leif Arrhenius | Shot put | 19.53 | 14 | Did not advance | |
| Niklas Arrhenius | Discus throw | 59.13 | 24 | Did not advance | |
| Mattias Jons | Hammer throw | 73.47 | 16 | Did not advance | |
| Kim Amb | Javelin throw | 80.84 | 9 q | 78.91 | 11 |
| Gabriel Wallin | Javelin throw | 74.66 | 29 | Did not advance | |

Combined events – Decathlon

| Athlete | Event | 100 m | LJ | SP | HJ | 400 m | 110H | DT | PV | JT | 1500 m | Final | Rank |
|---|---|---|---|---|---|---|---|---|---|---|---|---|---|
| Marcus Nilsson | Result | 11.42 | 6.62 | 14.81 | 1.87 | 50.56 | 15.04 | 42.49 | 4.50 | 54.86 | 4:20.11 | 7540 | 24 |
| Marcus Nilsson | Points | 769 | 725 | 778 | 687 | 789 | 845 | 715 | 760 | 661 | 811 | 7540 | 24 |

=== Women ===
Track and road events

| Athlete | Event | Heat | | Semifinal | | Final | |
| Athlete | Event | Result | Rank | Result | Rank | Result | Rank |
|---|---|---|---|---|---|---|---|
| Moa Hjelmer | 200 metres | 23.33 | 31 | Did not advance | | | |
| Moa Hjelmer | 400 metres | 52.39 | 24 | Did not advance | | | |
| Abeba Aregawi | 1500 metres | 4:07.66 | 6 Q | 4:05.66 | 9 Q | 4:02.67 | 1st place, gold medalist(s) |
| Charlotta Fougberg | 3000 m steeplechase | 9:59.17 | 26 | | | Did not advance | |

Field events

| Athlete | Event | Qualification | | Final | |
| Athlete | Event | Distance | Position | Distance | Position |
|---|---|---|---|---|---|
| Emma Green Tregaro | High jump | 1.92 | 1 q | 1.97 | 5 |
| Angelica Bengtsson | Pole vault | 4.45 | 16 | Did not advance | |
| Erica Jarder | Long jump | 6.59 | 9 q | 6.47 | 10 |
| Tracey Andersson | Hammer throw | 61.37 | 26 | Did not advance | |
| Sofi Flink | Javelin throw | 61.96 NR | 9 Q | 59.52 | 10 |

Combined events – Heptathlon

| Athlete | Event | 100H | HJ | SP | 200 m | LJ | JT | 800 m | Final | Rank |
|---|---|---|---|---|---|---|---|---|---|---|
| Sofia Linde | Result | 14.02 | 1.74 | 13.80 | 25.64 | 5.80 | 40.13 | 2:16.34 | 5822 | 25 |
| Sofia Linde | Points | 976 | 903 | 781 | 829 | 789 | 670 | 874 | 5822 | 25 |

== Sources ==
- Selected athletes (Swedish Athletic Association) (Swedish)
