= 2013 World Championships in Athletics – Men's decathlon =

Men's decathlon at the 2013 World Championships
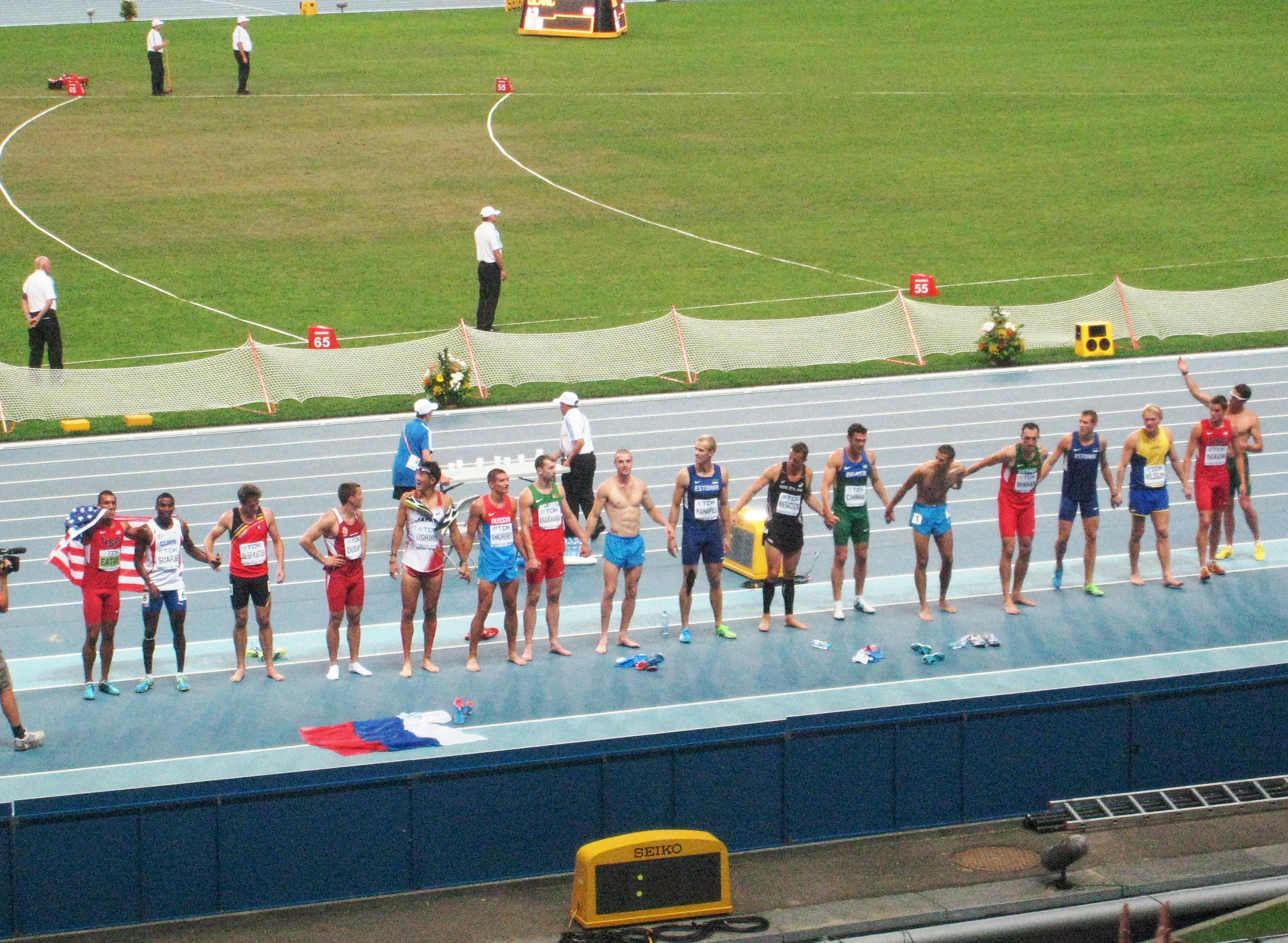
- Venue: Luzhniki Stadium
- Dates: 10 August; 11 August
- Competitors: 34 from 22 nations
- Winning points: 8809

Medalists
gold medal	Ashton Eaton; United States
silver medal	Michael Schrader; Germany
bronze medal	Damian Warner; Canada

Day 1–1 Video Day 1–2 Video Day 2–1 Video Day 2–2 Video

The men's decathlon at the 2013 World Championships in Athletics was held at the Luzhniki Stadium on 10–11 August in Moscow, Russia.

The first day ended with two Americans leading the competition, Olympic Champion and World Record holder Ashton Eaton and, surprisingly, World Junior Champion Gunnar Nixon who set a 15 cm personal record in the Long Jump, another in the Shot Put and led the field after the High Jump. After an average showing, particularly in the Shot Put and High Jump, Eaton regained the lead with 46.02 400 metres. Eaton's expected rival was defending champion and Eaton's Olympic runner up, American teammate Trey Hardee, who suffered from leg cramps and was only able to take slow, half-hearted attempts at the High Jump eventually no-heighting and dropping out.

The second day opened with Eaton beating the field in the 110 hurdles, opening up over 100 points on Nixon. Nixon's personal best was no match for Michael Schrader's personal best in the Discus as Schrader moved into second, with his German teammate Rico Freimuth and Damian Warner battling for third. Nixon fell out of contention. Eaton extended his lead with the third best pole vault of the day. Schrader scored big with his personal best in his lone attempt in the Javelin, but Eaton came through on his final throw to almost keep pace. Warner separated himself into a solid third with a personal best while Freimuth struggled with the poorest mark in the B group. The places were decided before the 1500, and in 80 percent humidity, there were no surprises.

== Records ==
Prior to the competition, the records were as follows:

World record	Ashton Eaton (USA)	9039	Eugene, United States	23 June 2012
Championship record	Tomáš Dvořák (CZE)	8902	Edmonton, Canada	7 August 2001
World leading	Pascal Behrenbruch (GER)	8514	Ratingen, Germany	16 June 2013
African record	Larbi Bourrada (ALG)	8302	Ratingen, Germany	17 July 2011
Asian record	Dmitriy Karpov (KAZ)	8725	Athens, Greece	24 August 2004
North, Central American and Caribbean record	Ashton Eaton (USA)	9039	Eugene, United States	23 June 2012
South American record	Carlos Chinin (BRA)	8393	São Paulo, Brazil	8 June 2013
European record	Roman Šebrle (CZE)	9026	Götzis, Austria	27 May 2001
Oceanian record	Jagan Hames (AUS)	8490	Kuala Lumpur, Malaysia	18 September 1998

== Qualification standards ==
A result	B result
8200 pts	8000 pts

== Schedule ==
Date	Time	Round
10 August 2013	09:35	100 metres
10 August 2013	10:35	Long jump
10 August 2013	12:20	Shot put
10 August 2013	15:30	High jump
10 August 2013	19:40	400 metres
11 August 2013	09:05	110 metres hurdles
11 August 2013	10:00	Discus throw
11 August 2013	13:05	Pole vault
11 August 2013	17:15	Javelin throw
11 August 2013	20:35	1500 metres

All times are local times (UTC+4)

== Results ==
KEY:	NR	National record	PB	Personal best	SB	Seasonal best

=== 100 metres ===
Wind:
Heat 1: -0.5 m/s, Heat 2: +0.1 m/s, Heat 3: -0.1 m/s, Heat 4: -0.5 m/s

Rank	Heat	Athlete	Nationality	Result	Points	Notes
1	4	Ashton Eaton	United States	10.35	1011	SB
2	4	Damian Warner	Canada	10.43	992	
3	4	Trey Hardee	United States	10.52	970	SB
4	4	Rico Freimuth	Germany	10.60	952	
5	4	Mihail Dudaš	Serbia	10.67	935	PB
6	4	Michael Schrader	Germany	10.73	922	
7	3	Carlos Chinin	Brazil	10.78	910	PB
8	4	Gunnar Nixon	United States	10.84	897	
9	4	Eelco Sintnicolaas	Netherlands	10.85	894	
10	2	Pascal Behrenbruch	Germany	10.95	872	SB
10	2	Willem Coertzen	South Africa	10.95	872	SB
12	3	Jeremy Taiwo	United States	10.96	870	
13	3	Ilya Shkurenyov	Russia	10.97	867	
13	4	Eduard Mikhan	Belarus	10.97	867	
15	2	Ingmar Vos	Netherlands	10.98	865	SB
15	3	Sergey Sviridov	Russia	10.98	865	
17	1	Oleksiy Kasyanov	Ukraine	10.99	863	SB
18	1	Leonel Suárez	Cuba	11.07	845	SB
19	2	Thomas van der Plaetsen	Belgium	11.09	841	PB
20	3	Artem Lukyanenko	Russia	11.11	836	
21	1	Brent Newdick	New Zealand	11.14	830	SB
22	3	Pelle Rietveld	Netherlands	11.15	827	
23	2	Gaël Quérin	France	11.19	819	
23	2	Andrei Krauchanka	Belarus	11.19	819	
25	1	Kurt Felix	Grenada	11.20	817	SB
25	1	Román Gastaldi	Argentina	11.20	817	SB
27	3	Maicel Uibo	Estonia	11.21	814	
28	3	Kevin Mayer	France	11.23	810	
29	1	Mikk Pahapill	Estonia	11.33	789	
30	3	Dmitriy Karpov	Kazakhstan	11.37	780	
31	2	Marcus Nilsson	Sweden	11.42	769	
32	1	Keisuke Ushiro	Japan	11.44	765	SB
33	1	Ali Kamé	Madagascar	11.48	757	
	2	Ashley Bryant	Great Britain & N.I.	DNS		

=== Long jump ===
Rank	Group	Athlete	Nationality	No. 1	No. 2	No. 3	Result	Points	Notes	Overall	Overall Rank
1	A	Michael Schrader	Germany	7.85	X	X	7.85	1022	SB	1944	2
2	A	Gunnar Nixon	United States	X	7.80	X	7.80	1010	PB	1907	3
3	A	Ashton Eaton	United States	7.44	7.71	7.73	7.73	992	SB	2003	1
4	A	Eelco Sintnicolaas	Netherlands	X	7.42	7.65	7.65	972	PB	1866	7
5	A	Thomas van der Plaetsen	Belgium	X	X	7.64	7.64	970	–	1811	11
6	A	Carlos Chinin	Brazil	X	X	7.54	7.54	945	–	1855	8
7	B	Jeremy Taiwo	United States	7.53	7.32	–	7.53	942	PB	1812	10
8	A	Mihail Dudaš	Serbia	X	7.35	7.51	7.51	937	–	1872	5
9	A	Kevin Mayer	France	X	7.50	X	7.50	935	–	1745	17
10	B	Ingmar Vos	Netherlands	7.45	X	7.24	7.45	922	SB	1787	13
11	B	Willem Coertzen	South Africa	7.44	X	7.36	7.44	920	SB	1792	12
12	A	Eduard Mikhan	Belarus	6.97	7.09	7.42	7.42	915	–	1782	14
13	A	Kurt Felix	Grenada	7.41	7.39	X	7.41	913	–	1730	21
14	A	Andrei Krauchanka	Belarus	7.26	7.30	7.39	7.39	908	–	1727	22
14	B	Damian Warner	Canada	7.26	7.30	7.39	7.39	908		1900	4
16	B	Trey Hardee	United States	7.30	7.29	7.35	7.35	898	SB	1868	6
16	A	Ilya Shkurenyov	Russia	X	X	7.35	7.35	898	–	1765	15
18	B	Leonel Suárez	Cuba	7.17	7.33	7.00	7.33	893	SB	1738	19
19	B	Sergey Sviridov	Russia	X	7.30	7.22	7.30	886	SB	1751	16
20	B	Brent Newdick	New Zealand	X	7.17	7.28	7.28	881	SB	1711	23
21	A	Oleksiy Kasyanov	Ukraine	7.27	X	X	7.27	878	–	1741	18
22	A	Maicel Uibo	Estonia	7.17	X	7.26	7.26	876	–	1690	24
23	A	Rico Freimuth	Germany	X	7.05	7.22	7.22	866	–	1818	9
24	B	Pascal Behrenbruch	Germany	X	X	7.19	7.19	859	SB	1731	20
25	A	Gaël Quérin	France	7.06	7.18	X	7.18	857	–	1676	25
26	B	Mikk Pahapill	Estonia	7.01	7.12	6.91	7.12	842		1631	27
27	B	Artem Lukyanenko	Russia	6.99	7.09	X	7.09	835		1671	26
28	B	Román Gastaldi	Argentina	6.89	6.79	6.71	6.89	788		1605	28
29	B	Keisuke Ushiro	Japan	6.53	6.53	6.84	6.84	776		1541	30
30	B	Ali Kamé	Madagascar	X	X	6.72	6.72	748	SB	1505	31
31	B	Pelle Rietveld	Netherlands	X	6.68	X	6.68	739		1566	29
32	B	Marcus Nilsson	Sweden	6.57	6.62	X	6.62	725		1494	33
33	B	Dmitriy Karpov	Kazakhstan	6.53	6.59	6.55	6.59	718		1498	32

=== Shot put ===
Rank	Group	Athlete	Nationality	No. 1	No. 2	No. 3	Result	Points	Notes	Overall	Overall Rank
1	A	Pascal Behrenbruch	Germany	15.86	X	15.56	15.86	843	–	2574	9
2	A	Dmitriy Karpov	Kazakhstan	X	15.39	14.84	15.39	814	–	2312	29
3	A	Mikk Pahapill	Estonia	14.37	14.38	14.87	14.87	782	–	2413	24
4	A	Andrei Krauchanka	Belarus	14.84	X	X	14.84	780	–	2507	14
5	A	Marcus Nilsson	Sweden	13.44	14.27	14.81	14.81	778	–	2272	30
6	A	Rico Freimuth	Germany	X	13.74	14.80	14.80	777	–	2595	8
7	A	Gunnar Nixon	United States	14.68	X	–	14.68	770	PB	2677	3
8	A	Trey Hardee	United States	14.61	14.60	14.61	14.61	766	–	2634	5
9	A	Michael Schrader	Germany	13.94	13.96	14.56	14.56	763	–	2707	2
10	A	Carlos Chinin	Brazil	14.11	14.49	X	14.49	758	–	2613	6
11	A	Artem Lukyanenko	Russia	13.28	14.43	X	14.43	755	–	2426	23
12	A	Ashton Eaton	United States	13.36	14.19	14.39	14.39	752	–	2755	1
13	B	Damian Warner	Canada	14.23	14.04	14.06	14.23	742	PB	2642	4
14	A	Sergey Sviridov	Russia	13.68	14.20	X	14.20	741	–	2492	16
14	B	Leonel Suárez	Cuba	13.85	14.20	14.15	14.20	741	SB	2479	19
16	A	Eduard Mikhan	Belarus	13.86	14.15	X	14.15	738	–	2520	11
17	B	Eelco Sintnicolaas	Netherlands	13.45	13.99	14.08	14.08	733	–	2599	7
18	A	Oleksiy Kasyanov	Ukraine	13.99	14.05	X	14.05	731	–	2472	20
19	B	Román Gastaldi	Argentina	13.25	13.96	X	13.96	726	SB	2331	28
20	B	Willem Coertzen	South Africa	13.42	13.88	X	13.88	721	SB	2513	12
20	B	Ilya Shkurenyov	Russia	13.21	13.88	13.66	13.88	721	–	2486	17
22	B	Brent Newdick	New Zealand	13.78	13.84	X	13.84	719	SB	2430	22
23	B	Ingmar Vos	Netherlands	12.88	13.81	13.68	13.81	717	–	2504	15
24	A	Kevin Mayer	France	13.76	13.50	X	13.76	714	–	2459	21
25	B	Maicel Uibo	Estonia	13.68	X	X	13.68	709	PB	2399	25
26	B	Thomas van der Plaetsen	Belgium	13.57	10.74	X	13.57	702	PB	2513	13
27	A	Mihail Dudaš	Serbia	13.08	13.45	X	13.45	695	–	2567	10
28	B	Pelle Rietveld	Netherlands	13.21	13.12	X	13.21	680	–	2246	31
29	B	Keisuke Ushiro	Japan	X	13.17	X	13.17	678	–	2219	32
30	B	Gaël Quérin	France	X	13.03	12.28	13.03	669	–	2345	27
31	B	Jeremy Taiwo	United States	12.66	12.78	12.99	12.99	667	–	2479	18
32	B	Kurt Felix	Grenada	12.75	12.81	12.95	12.95	664	SB	2394	26
33	B	Ali Kamé	Madagascar	12.33	X	12.73	12.73	651	–	2156	33

=== High jump ===
Rank	Group	Athlete	Nationality	1.78	1.81	1.84	1.87	1.90	1.93	1.96	1.99	2.02	2.05	2.08	2.11	2.14	2.17	Result	Points	Notes	Overall	Overall Rank
1	A	Gunnar Nixon	United States	–	–	–	–	–	–	–	o	–	xo	o	o	xo	xxx	2.14	934	–	3611	1
2	A	Andrei Krauchanka	Belarus	–	–	–	–	–	o	–	o	o	o	xxo	o	xxx		2.11	906	SB	3413	6
3	A	Maicel Uibo	Estonia	–	–	–	–	–	–	o	–	o	o	o	xo	xxx		2.11	906	–	3305	16
4	B	Kurt Felix	Grenada	–	–	–	–	–	–	–	o	–	xo	xxo	xxx			2.08	878	SB	3272	18
5	A	Willem Coertzen	South Africa	–	–	–	–	o	–	o	o	o	o	xxx				2.05	850	PB	3363	10
6	A	Ilya Shkurenyov	Russia	–	–	–	–	o	–	o	o	xo	o	xxx				2.05	850	SB	3336	14
6	A	Thomas van der Plaetsen	Belgium	–	–	–	–	–	–	o	–	xo	o	xxx				2.05	850	–	3363	11
6	B	Ingmar Vos	Netherlands	–	–	–	–	0	o	o	o	xo	o	xxx				2.05	850	SB	3354	12
9	A	Kevin Mayer	France	–	–	–	–	o	–	o	o	o	xo	xxx				2.05	850	SB	3309	15
10	A	Damian Warner	Canada	–	–	–	–	–	o	o	o	xo	xxo	xxx				2.05	850	–	3492	4
11	B	Brent Newdick	New Zealand	–	–	o	–	o	–	o	o	o	xxx					2.02	822	PB	3252	19
12	A	Eelco Sintnicolaas	Netherlands	–	–	o	–	o	–	o	xxo	o	xxx					2.02	822	–	3421	5
13	B	Michael Schrader	Germany	–	–	–	o	–	o	o	o							1.99	794	PB	3501	2
14	A	Artem Lukyanenko	Russia	–	–	–	o	o	o	xo	o	xxx						1.99	794	–	3220	20
15	B	Pascal Behrenbruch	Germany	–	–	–	o	o	o	o	xo	xxx						1.99	794	SB	3368	9
16	A	Mikk Pahapill	Estonia	–	–	–	–	xo	xxo	xo	xo	xxx						1.99	794	–	3207	21
17	B	Rico Freimuth	Germany	–	–	o	o	o	xo	o	xxo	xxx						1.99	794	PB	3389	7
18	A	Mihail Dudaš	Serbia	–	–	–	–	o	–	o	xxx							1.96	767	–	3334	14
19	A	Carlos Chinin	Brazil	–	–	o	o	o	o	xo	xxx							1.96	767	–	3380	8
19	A	Eduard Mikhan	Belarus	–	–	–	o	–	o	xo	xxx							1.96	767	–	3287	17
21	A	Keisuke Ushiro	Japan	–	–	–	o	o	xo	xxo	xxx							1.96	767	–	2986	27
22	B	Ashton Eaton	United States	–	–	–	o	–	xo	xxx								1.93	740	–	3495	3
23	A	Sergey Sviridov	Russia	–	–	–	o	o	xxx									1.90	714	–	3206	22
24	B	Ali Kamé	Madagascar	o	o	o	o	xo	xxx									1.90	714	SB	2870	30
25	B	Gaël Quérin	France	–	–	o	xo	xo	xxx									1.90	714	–	3059	25
26	B	Oleksiy Kasyanov	Ukraine	–	–	xo	–	xxo										1.90	714	SB	3186	24
26	B	Pelle Rietveld	Netherlands	o	o	o	xo	xxo	xxx									1.90	714	SB	2960	28
28	B	Leonel Suárez	Cuba	–	–	xxo	–	xxo	–	xxx								1.90	714	SB	3193	23
29	B	Román Gastaldi	Argentina	–	–	x	xo	xxx										1.87	687	–	3018	26
29	B	Marcus Nilsson	Sweden	–	o	o	xo	xxx										1.87	687	–	2959	29
	B	Trey Hardee	United States	–	–	–	–	–	xxx									NM	0	–	2870	31
	A	Jeremy Taiwo	United States															DNS	0		DNF	–
	B	Dmitriy Karpov	Kazakhstan															DNS	0		DNF	–

=== 400 metres ===
Rank	Heat	Athlete	Nationality	Result	Reaction Time	Points	Notes	Overall	Overall Rank
1	4	Ashton Eaton	United States	46.02	0.163	1007	–	4502	1
2	2	Michael Schrader	Germany	47.66	0.177	926	PB	4427	3
3	1	Mihail Dudaš	Serbia	47.73	0.218	922	SB	4256	9
4	4	Rico Freimuth	Germany	48.05	0.204	907	SB	4296	6
5	1	Leonel Suárez	Cuba	48.21	0.243	899	SB	4092	17
6	4	Eelco Sintnicolaas	Netherlands	48.25	0.188	897	–	4318	5
7	3	Willem Coertzen	South Africa	48.32	0.181	894	PB	4257	8
8	3	Ilya Shkurenyov	Russia	48.39	0.204	890	PB	4226	12
9	4	Pascal Behrenbruch	Germany	48.40	0.144	890	PB	4258	7
10	4	Damian Warner	Canada	48.41	0.163	889	–	4381	4
11	3	Gunnar Nixon	United States	48.56	0.159	882	SB	4493	2
12	4	Pelle Rietveld	Netherlands	48.67	0.142	877	–	3837	25
13	4	Gaël Quérin	France	48.78	0.204	872	–	3931	24
14	3	Eduard Mikhan	Belarus	48.80	0.207	871	SB	4158	14
14	4	Carlos Chinin	Brazil	48.80	0.173	871	–	4251	10
16	3	Thomas van der Plaetsen	Belgium	49.00	0.179	861	SB	4224	13
17	3	Artem Lukyanenko	Russia	49.01	0.208	861	PB	4081	19
18	2	Kevin Mayer	France	49.53	0.169	836	–	4145	15
19	3	Andrei Krauchanka	Belarus	49.65	0.198	831	–	4244	11
20	1	Oleksiy Kasyanov	Ukraine	49.75	0.204	826	SB	4012	22
21	2	Mikk Pahapill	Estonia	49.84	0.159	822	PB	4029	21
22	1	Brent Newdick	New Zealand	50.25	0.233	803	SB	4055	20
23	2	Marcus Nilsson	Sweden	50.56	0.196	789	–	3748	26
24	2	Maicel Uibo	Estonia	50.60	0.214	787	PB	4092	18
25	1	Ali Kamé	Madagascar	50.87	0.217	775	SB	3645	28
26	2	Ingmar Vos	Netherlands	51.02	0.199	768	–	4122	16
27	3	Sergey Sviridov	Russia	51.13	0.185	763	–	3969	23
28	2	Keisuke Ushiro	Japan	51.20	0.296	760	–	3746	27
	2	Román Gastaldi	Argentina	DQ	–	0		3018	29
		Kurt Felix	Grenada	DNS		0		DNF	–
		Trey Hardee	United States	DNS		0		DNF	–

=== 110 metres hurdles ===
Wind:
Heat 1: -0.2 m/s, Heat 2: 0 m/s, Heat 3: -0.1 m/s, Heat 4: +0.4 m/s

Rank	Heat	Athlete	Nationality	Result	Reaction Time	Points	Notes	Overall	Overall Rank
1	4	Ashton Eaton	United States	13.72	0.158	1011	–	5513	1
2	4	Rico Freimuth	Germany	13.90	0.194	987	–	5283	5
3	4	Damian Warner	Canada	13.96	0.158	980	–	5361	4
4	4	Carlos Chinin	Brazil	14.05	0.172	968	PB	5219	7
5	4	Eelco Sintnicolaas	Netherlands	14.18	0.185	951	–	5269	6
6	2	Kevin Mayer	France	14.21	0.179	948	PB	5093	14
7	3	Artem Lukyanenko	Russia	14.21	0.213	948	–	5029	15
8	4	Michael Schrader	Germany	14.29	0.165	937	–	5364	3
9	2	Willem Coertzen	South Africa	14.30	0.193	936	–	5193	8
10	3	Ilya Shkurenyov	Russia	14.34	0.179	931	–	5157	11
11	3	Pelle Rietveld	Netherlands	14.37	0.167	927	–	4764	23
12	2	Andrei Krauchanka	Belarus	14.44	0.191	918	–	5162	10
13	2	Pascal Behrenbruch	Germany	14.46	0.159	916	–	5174	9
14	1	Mikk Pahapill	Estonia	14.54	0.153	906	–	4935	18
15	4	Gunnar Nixon	United States	14.57	0.209	902	–	5395	2
16	4	Mihail Dudaš	Serbia	14.59	0.205	900	PB	5156	12
17	1	Leonel Suárez	Cuba	14.62	0.267	896	SB	4988	17
18	2	Thomas van der Plaetsen	Belgium	14.66	0.148	891	SB	5115	13
19	4	Eduard Mikhan	Belarus	14.82	0.181	871	–	5029	16
20	2	Gaël Quérin	France	14.87	0.181	865	–	4796	21
21	2	Marcus Nilsson	Sweden	15.04	0.191	845	–	4593	24
22	1	Brent Newdick	New Zealand	15.19	0.142	827	SB	4882	20
23	1	Ali Kamé	Madagascar	15.20	0.171	825	SB	4470	26
24	3	Sergey Sviridov	Russia	15.23	0.186	822	SB	4791	22
25	3	Maicel Uibo	Estonia	15.29	0.204	815	–	4907	19
26	1	Keisuke Ushiro	Japan	15.32	0.221	811	–	4557	25
	2	Ingmar Vos	Netherlands	DQ		0	–	4122	27
	1	Oleksiy Kasyanov	Ukraine	DNF		0	–	4012	28
	1	Román Gastaldi	Argentina	DNS		0	–	DNF	–

=== Discus throw ===
Rank	Group	Athlete	Nationality	No. 1	No. 2	No. 3	Result	Points	Notes	Overall	Overall Rank
1	A	Rico Freimuth	Germany	48.41	48.74	47.85	48.74	844		6127	3
2	A	Eduard Mikhan	Belarus	44.93	x	48.00	48.00	829		5858	14
3	A	Mikk Pahapill	Estonia	47.57	x	x	47.57	820		5755	18
4	A	Michael Schrader	Germany	43.49	41.06	46.44	46.44	797	PB	6161	2
5	A	Leonel Suárez	Cuba	46.41	43.15	x	46.41	796	SB	5784	16
6	A	Andrei Krauchanka	Belarus	46.12	x	44.65	46.12	790		5952	8
7	A	Carlos Chinin	Brazil	42.76	x		45.84	784	SB	6003	6
8	A	Pascal Behrenbruch	Germany	38.05	42.82	45.66	45.66	780		5954	7
9	A	Kevin Mayer	France	45.37	x	43.55	45.37	774	PB	5867	13
10	A	Keisuke Ushiro	Japan	45.31	44.26	45.17	45.31	773		5330	24
11	A	Sergey Sviridov	Russia	45.26	x	x	45.26	772		5563	21
12	A	Ashton Eaton	United States	44.35	x	45.00	45.00	767		6280	1
13	B	Damian Warner	Canada	44.13	x	43.78	44.13	749	SB	6110	4
14	B	Artem Lukyanenko	Russia	44.06	43.90	x	44.06	748		5777	17
15	A	Ilya Shkurenyov	Russia	39.84	44.06	41.75	44.06	748		5905	11
16	B	Mihail Dudaš	Serbia	44.06	x	x	44.06	748	SB	5904	12
17	B	Willem Coertzen	South Africa	41.24	43.25	42.52	43.25	731		5924	9
18	B	Ingmar Vos	Netherlands	x	42.76	42.77	42.77	721		4843	27
19	A	Marcus Nilsson	Sweden	41.99	42.49	41.40	42.49	715		5308	25
20	B	Brent Newdick	New Zealand	x	41.22	42.49	42.49	715		5597	20
21	B	Gunnar Nixon	United States	40.76	42.38	x	42.38	713	PB	6108	5
22	A	Maicel Uibo	Estonia	x	x	41.84	41.84	702		5609	19
23	B	Thomas van der Plaetsen	Belgium	41.17	x	x	41.17	688		5803	15
24	B	Eelco Sintnicolaas	Netherlands	39.14	33.17	39.21	39.21	649		5918	10
25	B	Gaël Quérin	France	38.09	38.34	x	38.34	631		5427	22
26	B	Pelle Rietveld	Netherlands	38.06	37.06	36.33	38.06	625		5389	23
27	B	Ali Kamé	Madagascar	x	36.86	x	36.86	601		5071	26
28	B	Oleksiy Kasyanov	Ukraine	x	x	x	NM			4012	28

=== Pole vault ===
Rank	Group	Athlete	Nationality	3.80	3.90	4.00	4.10	4.20	4.30	4.40	4.50	4.60	4.70	4.80	4.90	5.00	5.10	5.20	5.30	5.40	Result	Points	Notes	Overall	Overall Rank
1	A	Ilya Shkurenyov	Russia	–	–	–	–	–	–	–	–	–	o	–	o	o	o	o	o	xxo	5.40	1035	PB	6940	6
2	A	Eelco Sintnicolaas	Netherlands	–	–	–	–	–	–	–	–	–	–	–	–	–	–	xo	xo	xxx	5.30	1004	–	6922	7
3	A	Ashton Eaton	United States	–	–	–	–	–	–	–	–	–	xo	–	o	o	o	xo	xxx		5.20	972	SB	7252	1
4	A	Kevin Mayer	France	–	–	–	–	–	–	–	–	–	–	o	–	o	xo	xxo	xxx		5.20	972	PB	6839	10
5	A	Pelle Rietveld	Netherlands	–	–	–	–	–	–	–	o	–	o	o	xxo	o	o	xxx			5.10	941	PB	6330	21
6	A	Andrei Krauchanka	Belarus	–	–	–	–	–	–	–	–	o	–	o	o	o	xo	xxx			5.10	941	SB	6893	9
6	A	Thomas van der Plaetsen	Belgium	–	–	–	–	–	–	–	–	–	–	–	–	o	xo	xxx			5.10	941	–	6744	13
8	A	Carlos Chinin	Brazil	–	–	–	–	–	–	–	–	o	–	xo	o	xxo	xo	xxx			5.10	941	PB	6944	5
9	A	Michael Schrader	Germany	–	–	–	–	–	–	–	–	o	–	o	–	o	xxx				5.00	910	–	7071	2
10	A	Mikk Pahapill	Estonia	–	–	–	–	–	–	–	–	xo	–	o	o	xo	xxx				5.00	910	SB	6665	16
11	A	Artem Lukyanenko	Russia	–	–	–	–	–	–	–	o	–	o	o	o	xxo	xxx				5.00	910	–	6687	14
12	A	Maicel Uibo	Estonia	–	–	–	–	–	–	–	–	–	xo	xo	o	xxx					4.90	880	–	6489	19
1	B	Leonel Suárez	Cuba	–	–	–	–	–	–	–	–	o	–	xo	xo	xxx					4.90	880	SB	6664	17
2	B	Mihail Dudaš	Serbia	–	–	–	–	–	–	–	–	o	xo	xo	xo	xxx					4.90	880	PB	6784	11
2	B	Rico Freimuth	Germany	–	–	–	–	–	–	–	–	o	–	xxo	xo	xxx					4.90	880	PB	7007	3
13	A	Keisuke Ushiro	Japan	–	–	–	–	–	–	–	–	o	–	o	xxo	xxx					4.90	880	PB	6210	23
4	B	Damian Warner	Canada	–	–	–	–	–	–	o	–	xo	xo	xxo	xxx						4.80	849	PB	6959	4
14	A	Pascal Behrenbruch	Germany	–	–	–	–	–	–	–	–	o	o	xxx							4.70	819	–	6773	12
5	B	Gunnar Nixon	United States	–	–	–	–	–	xxo	–	o	o	xxx								4.60	790	–	6898	8
6	B	Eduard Mikhan	Belarus	–	–	–	–	–	–	o	o	xo	xxx								4.60	790	–	6648	18
7	B	Willem Coertzen	South Africa	–	–	–	–	o	–	o	o	xxx									4.50	760	SB	6684	15
8	B	Sergey Sviridov	Russia	–	–	–	–	o	–	xo	o	xxx									4.50	760	SB	6323	22
9	B	Marcus Nilsson	Sweden	–	–	–	–	o	o	o	xo	xxx									4.50	760	–	6068	24
9	B	Brent Newdick	New Zealand	–	–	–	–	–	o	–	xo	–	xxx								4.50	760	–	6357	20
11	B	Ali Kamé	Madagascar	xo	–	o	o	xo	xxx												4.20	673	SB	5744	25
	A	Gaël Quérin	France	–	–	–	–	–	–	–	–	–	xxx								NM	0		5427	26
	B	Ingmar Vos	Netherlands	xR																	NM	0		4843	27
	B	Oleksiy Kasyanov	Ukraine																		DNS	0		DNF	–

=== Javelin throw ===
Rank	Group	Athlete	Nationality	No. 1	No. 2	No. 3	Result	Points	Notes	Overall	Overall Rank
1	A	Sergey Sviridov	Russia	69.38	66.60	X	69.38	880	PB	7203	20
2	A	Willem Coertzen	South Africa	69.35	X	64.30	69.35	879	PB	7563	12
3	B	Leonel Suárez	Cuba	68.61	66.77	68.16	68.61	868	SB	7532	14
4	A	Keisuke Ushiro	Japan	67.65	58.81	64.19	67.65	854	SB	7064	22
5	A	Pascal Behrenbruch	Germany	62.67	65.59	64.19	67.07	845	–	7618	9
6	B	Kevin Mayer	France	61.14	X	66.09	66.09	830	PB	7669	7
7	A	Ali Kamé	Madagascar	65.76	X	–	65.76	825	PB	6569	25
8	A	Michael Schrader	Germany	65.67	–	–	65.67	824	PB	7895	2
9	B	Thomas van der Plaetsen	Belgium	65.31	63.47	X	65.31	818	PB	7562	13
10	B	Ashton Eaton	United States	57.44	X	64.83	64.83	811	–	8063	1
11	B	Damian Warner	Canada	63.76	64.67	X	64.67	808	PB	7767	3
12	B	Pelle Rietveld	Netherlands	X	X	64.38	64.38	804	–	7446	21
13	A	Mikk Pahapill	Estonia	62.89	X	X	62.89	781	–	7446	17
14	A	Ingmar Vos	Netherlands	59.79	62.10	X	62.10	769	SB	5612	27
15	B	Artem Lukyanenko	Russia	57.46	61.83	54.99	61.83	765	–	7452	16
16	B	Carlos Chinin	Brazil	59.98	56.49	59.21	59.98	738	PB	7682	5
16	B	Andrei Krauchanka	Belarus	59.98	59.02	57.68	59.98	738	–	7631	8
18	A	Maicel Uibo	Estonia	59.63	X	58.56	59.63	732	PB	7221	19
19	B	Ilya Shkurenyov	Russia	58.41	59.46	58.27	59.46	730	PB	7670	6
20	B	Mihail Dudaš	Serbia	58.09	59.06	56.61	59.06	724	SB	7508	15
21	A	Gunnar Nixon	United States	54.12	57.97	57.49	57.97	707	–	7605	11
22	A	Brent Newdick	New Zealand	54.37	57.30	56.90	57.30	697	–	7054	23
23	B	Eelco Sintnicolaas	Netherlands	55.17	56.36	56.75	56.75	689	SB	7611	10
24	B	Rico Freimuth	Germany	56.21	54.26	52.93	56.21	681	–	7688	4
25	A	Marcus Nilsson	Sweden	54.86	53.19	53.68	54.86	661	–	6729	24
26	A	Eduard Mikhan	Belarus	50.74	X	X	50.74	600	–	7248	18
27	A	Gaël Quérin	France	48.71	50.66	46.39	50.66	598	–	6025	26

=== 1500 metres ===
Rank	Heat	Athlete	Nationality	Result	Points	Notes
1	1	Gaël Quérin	France	4:18.58	821	
2	1	Marcus Nilsson	Sweden	4:20.11	811	SB
3	2	Leonel Suárez	Cuba	4:23.87	785	SB
4	2	Willem Coertzen	South Africa	4:24.60	780	SB
5	2	Eelco Sintnicolaas	Netherlands	4:24.64	780	SB
6	2	Kevin Mayer	France	4:25.04	777	
7	2	Michael Schrader	Germany	4:25.38	775	SB
8	1	Mihail Dudaš	Serbia	4:26.62	767	SB
9	2	Ashton Eaton	United States	4:29.80	746	SB
10	2	Damian Warner	Canada	4:29.97	745	SB
11	1	Artem Lukyanenko	Russia	4:32.97	725	PB
12	1	Mikk Pahapill	Estonia	4:33.16	724	PB
13	1	Eduard Mikhan	Belarus	4:33.71	720	
14	2	Gunnar Nixon	United States	4:35.82	707	
15	1	Pelle Rietveld	Netherlands	4:35.94	706	SB
16	2	Carlos Chinin	Brazil	4:36.01	706	
17	2	Ilya Shkurenyov	Russia	4:36.95	700	
18	2	Pascal Behrenbruch	Germany	4:37.21	698	
19	2	Rico Freimuth	Germany	4:37.83	694	
20	2	Thomas van der Plaetsen	Belgium	4:37.93	693	SB
21	1	Brent Newdick	New Zealand	4:38.54	690	SB
22	1	Keisuke Ushiro	Japan	4:38.91	687	
23	2	Andrei Krauchanka	Belarus	4:39.63	683	
24	1	Sergey Sviridov	Russia	4:46.43	640	SB
25	1	Maicel Uibo	Estonia	4:48.29	629	
	1	Ali Kamé	Madagascar	DNS	0	
	1	Ingmar Vos	Netherlands	DNS	0	

=== Final standings ===
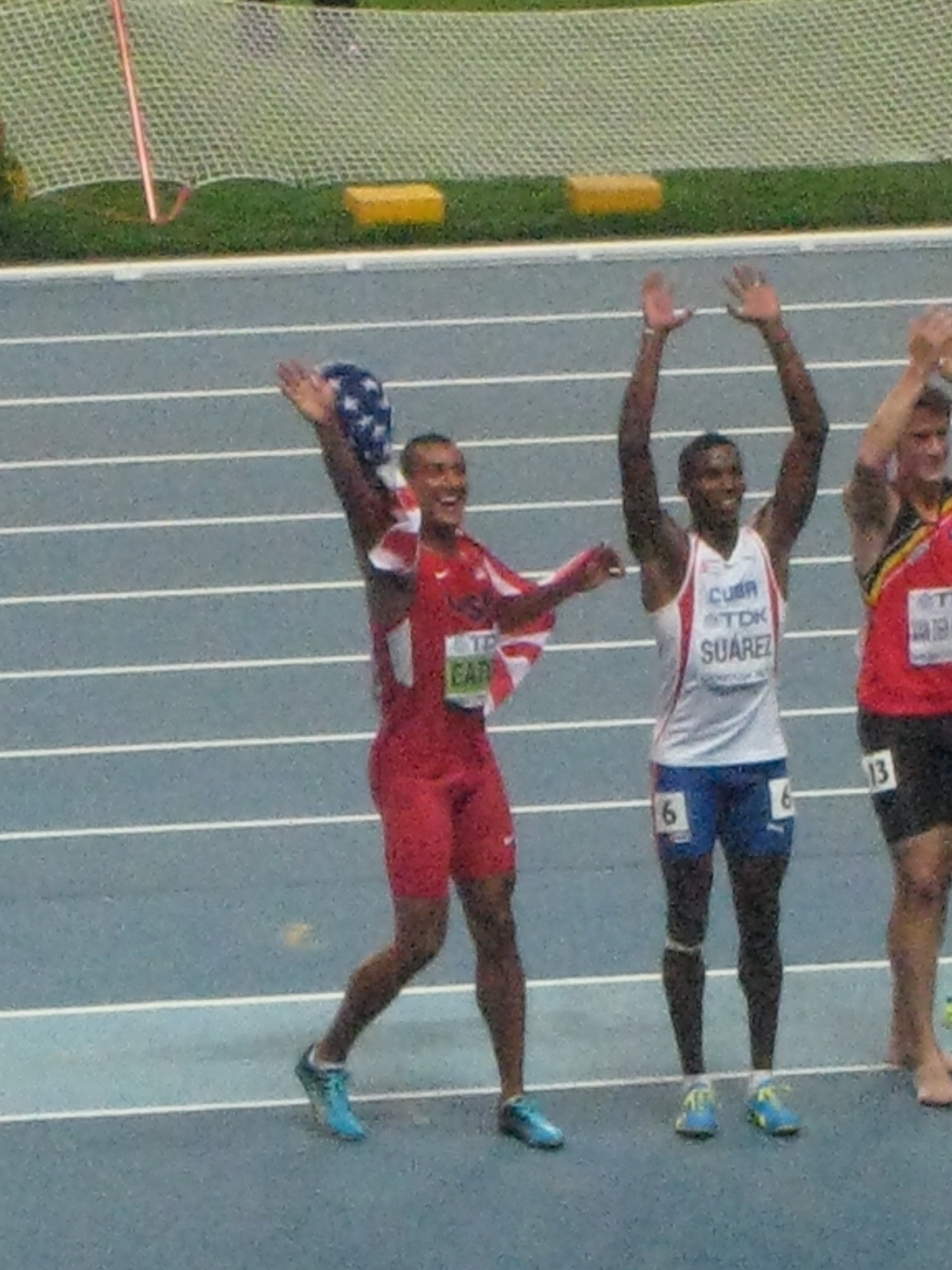
Ashton Eaton (left), the gold medalist of the event.

Rank	Athlete	Nationality	Points	Notes
1st place, gold medalist(s)	Ashton Eaton	United States	8809	WL
2nd place, silver medalist(s)	Michael Schrader	Germany	8670	PB
3rd place, bronze medalist(s)	Damian Warner	Canada	8512	PB
4	Kevin Mayer	France	8446	PB
5	Eelco Sintnicolaas	Netherlands	8391	SB
6	Carlos Chinin	Brazil	8388	
7	Rico Freimuth	Germany	8382	PB
8	Ilya Shkurenyov	Russia	8370	PB
9	Willem Coertzen	South Africa	8343	AR
10	Leonel Suárez	Cuba	8317	SB
11	Pascal Behrenbruch	Germany	8316	
12	Andrei Krauchanka	Belarus	8314	
13	Gunnar Nixon	United States	8312	PB
14	Mihail Dudaš	Serbia	8275	NR
15	Thomas van der Plaetsen	Belgium	8255	PB
16	Artem Lukyanenko	Russia	8177	PB
17	Mikk Pahapill	Estonia	8170	SB
18	Eduard Mikhan	Belarus	7968	
19	Maicel Uibo	Estonia	7850	
20	Sergey Sviridov	Russia	7843	
21	Pelle Rietveld	Netherlands	7840	SB
22	Keisuke Ushiro	Japan	7751	
23	Brent Newdick	New Zealand	7744	SB
24	Marcus Nilsson	Sweden	7540	
25	Gaël Quérin	France	6846	
	Ali Kamé	Madagascar	DNF	
	Ingmar Vos	Netherlands	DNF	
	Oleksiy Kasyanov	Ukraine	DNF	
	Román Gastaldi	Argentina	DNF	
	Kurt Felix	Grenada	DNF	
	Trey Hardee	United States	DNF	
	Jeremy Taiwo	United States	DNF	
	Dmitriy Karpov	Kazakhstan	DNF	
	Ashley Bryant	Great Britain & N.I.	DNS	

Key: PB = Personal best, SB = Seasonal best, WL = World leading (in a given season)
