= 2013 World Championships in Athletics – Men's 100 metres =

Men's 100 metres at the 2013 World Championships
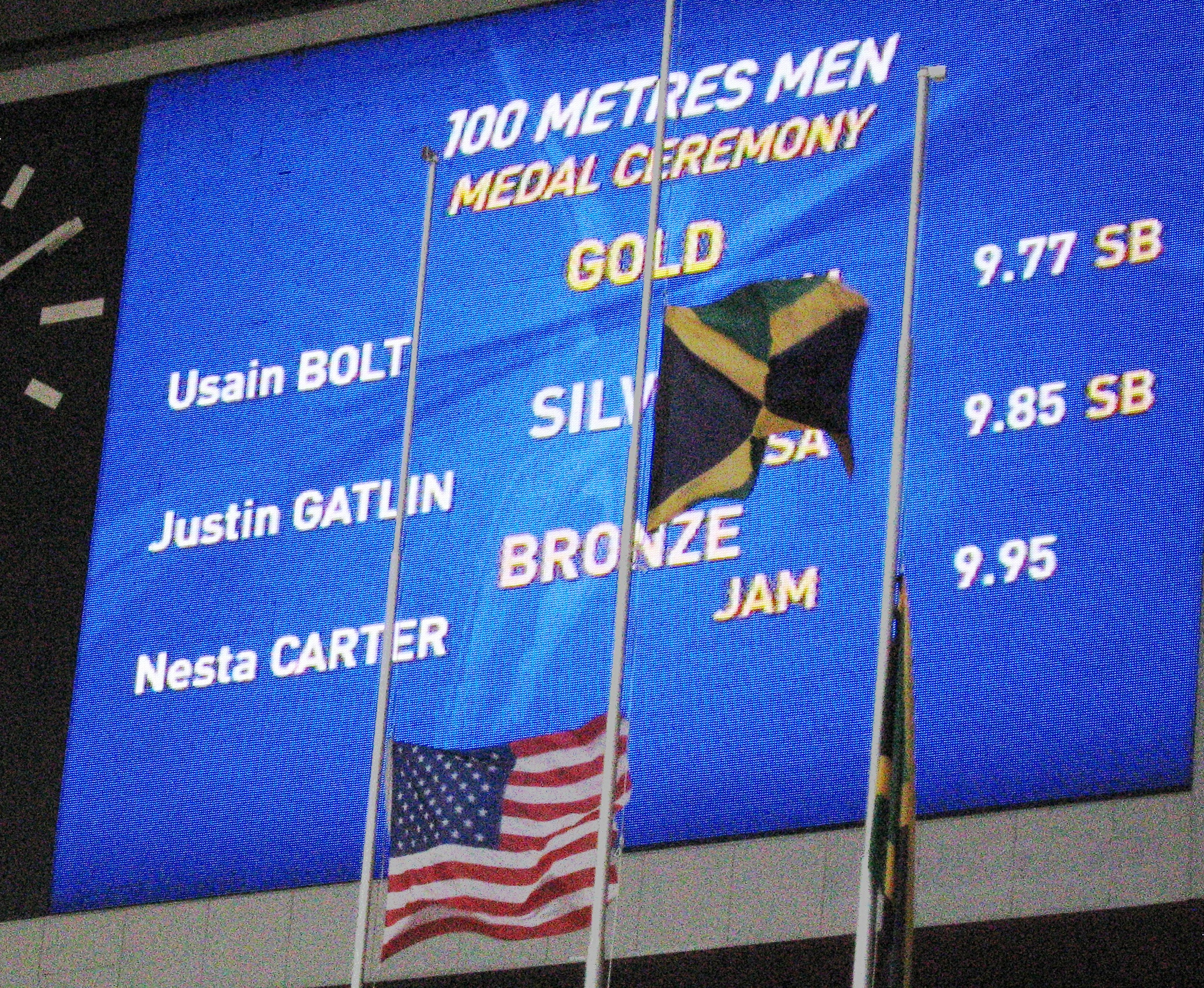
- Venue: Luzhniki Stadium
- Dates: 10 August (preliminary round & heats); 11 August (semifinal & final)
- Competitors: 74 from 56 nations
- Winning time: 9.77

Medalists
gold medal	Usain Bolt; Jamaica
silver medal	Justin Gatlin; United States
bronze medal	Nesta Carter; Jamaica

Official Video

The men's 100 metres at the 2013 World Championships in Athletics was held at the Luzhniki Stadium on 10 and 11 August.

Two national records were set in the preliminary round and Zhang Peimeng tied his own Chinese national record while qualifying in the heats. Zhang improved his record to 10.00 in the semifinal, but failed to advance to the final, it took 9 thousands faster as Christophe Lemaitre was the last qualifier. He was also timed officially in 10.00 in the same second heat of the semifinal round. Jamaica qualified four individuals into the final.

With his record, Usain Bolt was the favorite and with defending champion Yohan Blake injured, Justin Gatlin was Bolt's closest expected rival. Gatlin did have an early season victory against Bolt.

The final was held in a rainstorm. Gatlin got the best start, but Bolt, who overtook Gatlin, pulled away for the win. Nesta Carter chased them to finish third. Under the conditions, the medalists were the only finalists to improve upon their semifinal time in better weather earlier in the evening.

With the Russian all comers record at 10.03 coming into this meet, three competitors improved upon this mark through the heats. First Kemar Bailey-Cole improved the record to 10.02 in heat 1, which stood for less than 10 minutes when Gatlin took the record to 9.99 in heat 3 and 15 minutes later, Mike Rodgers improved it to 9.98 in heat 6. In the first semifinal, Gatlin regained the record, running 9.94, which lasted until the next semifinal when Nickel Ashmeade ran 9.90. Bolt settled the issue in the final with his 9.77.

== Records ==
Prior to the competition, the records were as follows:

World record	Usain Bolt (JAM)	9.58	Berlin, Germany	16 August 2009
Championship record	Usain Bolt (JAM)	9.58	Berlin, Germany	16 August 2009
World Leading	Tyson Gay (USA)	9.75	Des Moines, IA, United States	21 June 2013
African Record	Olusoji Fasuba (NGR)	9.85	Doha, Qatar	12 May 2006
Asian Record	Samuel Francis (QAT)	9.99	Amman, Jordan	26 July 2007
North, Central American and Caribbean record	Usain Bolt (JAM)	9.58	Berlin, Germany	16 August 2009
South American Record	Robson da Silva (BRA)	10.00A	Mexico City, Mexico	22 July 1988
European Record	Francis Obikwelu (POR)	9.86	Athens, Greece	22 August 2004
Oceanian record	Patrick Johnson (AUS)	9.93	Mito, Japan	5 May 2003

== Qualification standards ==
A time	B time
10.15	10.21

== Schedule ==
Date	Time	Round
10 August 2013	10:10	Preliminary round
10 August 2013	20:15	Heats
11 August 2013	19:05	Semifinals
11 August 2013	21:50	Final

All times are local times (UTC+4)

== Results ==
KEY:	q	Fastest non-qualifiers	Q	Qualified	NR	National record	PB	Personal best	SB	Seasonal best

=== Preliminary round ===
Qualification: First 2 in each heat (Q) and the next 3 fastest (q) advanced to the heats.

Despite being last in his heat and among the slowest runners to feature at the championships, Afghanistan's Masoud Azizi was disqualified for performance-enhancing drug use after a positive test for nandrolone.

Wind:
Heat 1: -0.4 m/s, Heat 2: +0.3 m/s, Heat 3: -0.5 m/s, Heat 4: -0.4 m/s

Rank	Heat	Lane	Name	Nationality	Time	Notes
1	3	2	Barakat Al-Harthi	Oman	10.47	Q
2	2	2	Aleksandr Brednev	Russia	10.49	Q
3	1	5	Daniel Bailey	Antigua and Barbuda	10.51	Q
4	2	8	Innocent Bologo	Burkina Faso	10.51	Q
5	4	2	Calvin Kang Li Loong	Singapore	10.52	Q, PB
6	3	3	Ratu Banuve Tabakaucoro	Fiji	10.53	Q, SB
7	3	5	Idrissa Adam	Cameroon	10.56	q
8	1	6	Holder da Silva	Guinea-Bissau	10.59	Q
9	4	7	Shernyl Burns	Montserrat	10.63	Q
10	4	9	Ifrish Alberg	Suriname	10.70	q
11	2	4	Sapwaturrahman Sapwaturrahman	Indonesia	10.75	q, SB
12	4	3	Devilert Arsene Kimbembe	Congo	10.77	SB
13	2	6	Kieron Rogers	Anguilla	10.80	
14	4	4	Mohammed Abukhousa	Palestine	10.87	NR
15	4	5	Denielsan Martins	Cape Verde	10.92	NR
16	4	6	Siueni Filimone	Tonga	10.93	
17	1	2	Riste Pandev	Macedonia	10.97	
18	3	6	Hugues Tshiyinga Mafo	DR Congo	11.11	PB
19	1	7	Faresa Kapisi	American Samoa	11.21	PB
20	3	8	Masbah Ahmmed	Bangladesh	11.23	
21	1	8	Mikel de Sa	Andorra	11.24	SB
22	3	7	Michael Alicto	Guam	11.39	PB
23	1	4	Daniel Philimon	Vanuatu	11.53	PB
24	3	4	Okilani Tinilau	Tuvalu	11.57	SB
25	2	3	Jesus T. Iguel	Northern Mariana Islands	11.65	PB
26	2	9	Roman William Cress	Marshall Islands	11.65	SB
27	1	3	Christopher Lima da Costa	São Tomé and Príncipe	11.79	SB
28	2	5	Gauthier Okawe	Gabon	11.83	PB
29	2	7	McCaffrey Gilmete	Federated States of Micronesia	11.86	PB
—N/a	4	8	Masoud Azizi	Afghanistan	11.78	DQ

=== Heats ===
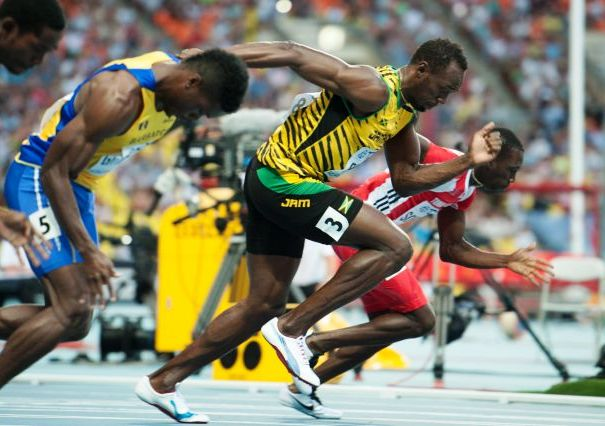
Heat 7 including Usain Bolt

Qualification: First 3 in each heat (Q) and the next 3 fastest (q) advanced to the semifinals.

Wind:
Heat 1: −0.2 m/s, Heat 2: −0.4 m/s, Heat 3: −0.3 m/s, Heat 4: −0.2 m/s, Heat 5: −0.1 m/s, Heat 6: −0.1 m/s, Heat 7: −0.4 m/s

Rank	Heat	Name	Nationality	Time	Notes
1	6	Mike Rodgers	United States	9.98	Q
2	3	Justin Gatlin	United States	9.99	Q
3	3	Keston Bledman	Trinidad and Tobago	10.02	Q
3	1	Kemar Bailey-Cole	Jamaica	10.02	Q
5	4	Zhang Peimeng	China	10.04	Q, NR
6	5	Jimmy Vicaut	France	10.06	Q
7	7	Usain Bolt	Jamaica	10.07	Q
8	2	Nesta Carter	Jamaica	10.11	Q
9	6	Nickel Ashmeade	Jamaica	10.12	Q
9	1	Christophe Lemaitre	France	10.12	Q
11	3	Dwain Chambers	Great Britain & N.I.	10.14	Q
11	4	Richard Thompson	Trinidad and Tobago	10.14	Q
13	5	Aaron Brown	Canada	10.15	Q
14	6	Harry Aikines-Aryeetey	Great Britain & N.I.	10.16	Q
14	6	Su Bingtian	China	10.16	q
16	7	Anaso Jobodwana	South Africa	10.17	Q
16	2	Churandy Martina	Netherlands	10.17	Q
18	3	Antoine Adams	Saint Kitts and Nevis	10.18	q
19	7	Ramon Gittens	Barbados	10.19	Q
19	4	Jason Rogers	Saint Kitts and Nevis	10.19	Q
21	4	James Dasaolu	Great Britain & N.I.	10.20	q
22	5	Samuel Francis	Qatar	10.21	Q
22	3	Sam Effah	Canada	10.21	
22	7	Ryota Yamagata	Japan	10.21	
25	5	Ángel David Rodríguez	Spain	10.23	
26	7	Rondel Sorrillo	Trinidad and Tobago	10.25	
27	6	Ogho-Oghene Egwero	Nigeria	10.26	
28	4	Julian Reus	Germany	10.27	
29	1	Gabriel Mvumvure	Zimbabwe	10.28	Q
30	4	Denis Dimitrov	Bulgaria	10.29	
31	1	Adam Harris	Guyana	10.30	
31	2	Gavin Smellie	Canada	10.30	Q
33	2	Yoshihide Kiryu	Japan	10.31	
34	1	Martin Keller	Germany	10.32	
35	5	Charles Silmon	United States	10.34	
36	3	Shavez Hart	Bahamas	10.36	
37	2	Andrew Hinds	Barbados	10.38	
37	3	Akani Simbine	South Africa	10.38	
39	7	Hua Wilfried Koffi	Ivory Coast	10.40	
40	6	Daniel Bailey	Antigua and Barbuda	10.45	
41	5	Reza Ghasemi	Iran	10.46	
41	1	Suwaibou Sanneh	Gambia	10.46	
41	2	Adam Zavacký	Slovakia	10.46	
44	2	Álex Quiñónez	Ecuador	10.50	
45	5	Aleksandr Brednev	Russia	10.52	
46	4	Barakat Al-Harthi	Oman	10.53	
46	6	Banuve Tabakaucoro	Fiji	10.53	
48	1	Innocent Bologo	Burkina Faso	10.57	
48	6	Hassan Taftian	Iran	10.57	
50	1	Calvin Kang Li Loong	Singapore	10.66	
51	4	Shernyl Burns	Montserrat	10.69	
52	3	Idrissa Adam	Cameroon	10.70	
52	5	Holder da Silva	Guinea-Bissau	10.70	
54	7	Sapwaturrahman Sapwaturrahman	Indonesia	10.89	
	2	Ifrish Alberg	Suriname	DNF	
	7	Kemar Hyman	Cayman Islands	DQ	R 162.7

=== Semifinals ===
Qualification: First 2 in each heat (Q) and the next 2 fastest (q) advance to the finals.

Wind:
Heat 1: -0.2 m/s, Heat 2: +0.4 m/s, Heat 3: +0.1 m/s

Rank	Heat	Lane	Name	Nationality	Time	Notes
1	2	6	Nickel Ashmeade	Jamaica	9.90	Q, PB
2	3	5	Usain Bolt	Jamaica	9.92	Q
3	2	4	Kemar Bailey-Cole	Jamaica	9.93	Q, PB
4	3	4	Mike Rodgers	United States	9.93	Q, SB
5	1	4	Justin Gatlin	United States	9.94	Q
6	1	5	Nesta Carter	Jamaica	9.97	Q
7	2	3	James Dasaolu	Great Britain & N.I.	9.97	q
8	2	7	Christophe Lemaitre	France	10.00	q
9	2	5	Zhang Peimeng	China	10.00	NR
10	1	7	Jimmy Vicaut	France	10.01	
11	3	7	Keston Bledman	Trinidad and Tobago	10.08	
12	3	9	Churandy Martina	Netherlands	10.09	
13	3	6	Aaron Brown	Canada	10.15	
14	2	9	Dwain Chambers	Great Britain & N.I.	10.15	
15	2	8	Jason Rogers	Saint Kitts and Nevis	10.15	
16	3	3	Antoine Adams	Saint Kitts and Nevis	10.17	
17	1	8	Anaso Jobodwana	South Africa	10.17	
18	1	6	Richard Thompson	Trinidad and Tobago	10.19	
19	1	3	Gabriel Mvumvure	Zimbabwe	10.21	
20	2	2	Gavin Smellie	Canada	10.30	
21	3	8	Ramon Gittens	Barbados	10.31	
22	1	9	Harry Aikines-Aryeetey	Great Britain & N.I.	10.34	
	1	2	Su Bingtian	China	DQ	R 162.7
	3	2	Samuel Francis	Qatar	DNS	

=== Final ===
Wind: -0.3 m/s

Rank	Lane	Name	Nationality	Time	Notes
1st place, gold medalist(s)	6	Usain Bolt	Jamaica	9.77	WL, SB
2nd place, silver medalist(s)	5	Justin Gatlin	United States	9.85	SB
3rd place, bronze medalist(s)	8	Nesta Carter	Jamaica	9.95	
4	7	Kemar Bailey-Cole	Jamaica	9.98	
5	4	Nickel Ashmeade	Jamaica	9.98	
6	9	Mike Rodgers	United States	10.04	
7	3	Christophe Lemaitre	France	10.06	
8	2	James Dasaolu	Great Britain & N.I.	10.21	
