= Michael Schrader =

German decathlete

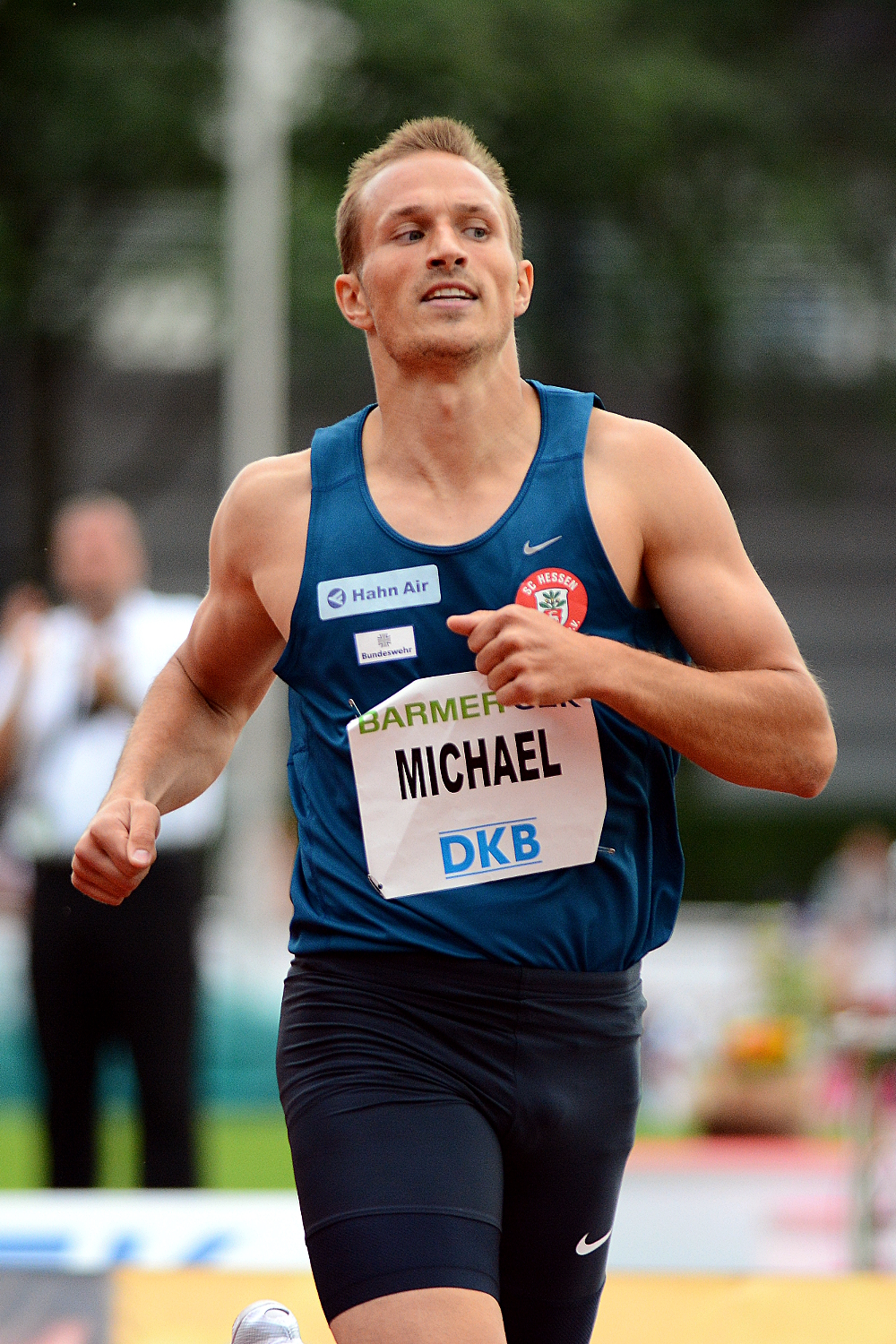

Medal record

Men's athletics

Representing Germany

World Championships
Silver medal – second place	2013 Moscow	Decathlon

Michael Schrader (German pronunciation: [ˈmɪçaʔeːl ˈʃʁaːdɐ]; born 1 July 1987 in Duisburg) is a German decathlete. He finished tenth at the 2008 Olympic Games. His personal best score is 8670 points, winning him the silver medal at the 2013 World Championships in Moscow.

Schrader won the national junior title with a score of 7297 points in 2005. He improved to 7695 points in 2006, a year in which he won the junior section at the Mehrkampf-Meeting Ratingen, but failed to finish at the 2006 World Junior Championships in Athletics. He moved up to the senior ranks in 2007, recorded a best of 7947 points and placed sixth at the 2007 European Athletics U23 Championships. Schrader edged over the 8000-point barrier in 2008 with a total of 8248 points in Ratingen and managed tenth place at the 2008 Beijing Olympics.

Schrader looked to be a strong home candidate for the decathlon at the 2009 World Championships in Athletics held in Berlin after beating Trey Hardee at the Hypo-Meeting with a much improved best of 8522 points, but a stress fracture injury ruled him out.

He won the German decathlon title in August 2010, scoring 8003 points to take a win over André Niklaus. However, injuries left him unable to compete in 2011 and unable to finish the event in his sole outing of 2012 at the Hypo Meeting.

He returned, recovered from injuries, in 2013 with a performance of 8427 points in Ulm, including personal bests of 10.52 seconds for the 100 m, 14.74 m for the shot put, 14.02 seconds for the 110 m hurdles and 45.62 m for the discus.

== Achievements ==
Year	Competition	Venue	Position	Event	Notes
Representing Germany
2006	World Junior Championships	Beijing, China	—	Decathlon (junior)	DNF
2007	European U23 Championships	Debrecen, Hungary	6th	Decathlon	7709 pts
2008	Olympic Games	Beijing, PR China	10th	Decathlon	8194 pts
2009	Hypo-Meeting	Götzis, Austria	1st	Decathlon	8522 pts
2013	World Championships	Moscow, Russia	2nd	Decathlon	8670 pts
2015	World Championships	Beijing, China	7th	Decathlon	8418 pts
