= 2013 World Championships in Athletics – Men's triple jump =

Sport competition

Men's triple jump at the 2013 World Championships
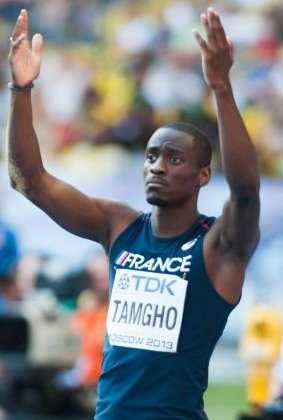
- Gold medalist Teddy Tamgho
- Venue: Luzhniki Stadium
- Dates: 16 August (qualification); 18 August (final)
- Competitors: 21 from 15 nations
- Winning distance: 18.04 m (59 ft 2 in)

Medalists
gold medal	Teddy Tamgho; France
silver medal	Pedro Pablo Pichardo; Cuba
bronze medal	Will Claye; United States

Official Video

The men's triple jump at the 2013 World Championships in Athletics was held at the Luzhniki Stadium on 16–18 August.

The event qualified three triple jumpers to the final, Teddy Tamgho Yoann Rapinier and Gaëtan Saku Bafuanga Baya who progressed via a Tie Breaker.

The first round revealed what would be the final order of finish for the first four jumpers, but not the final distances. Tamgho's first round jump of 17.65 m (57 ft 10 3/4 in) took the lead. In the second round Pedro Pablo Pichardo took the lead, putting one out to 17.68 m (58 ft 0 in), just one centimeter short of his world lead. Will Claye bounced his best jump in the third round, 17.52 m (57 ft 5 3/4 in). In the fourth round Tamgho equalled Pichardo with a 17.68 m (58 ft 0 in), though with the earlier 17.65 m (57 ft 10 3/4 in) he held the tiebreaker. With two more rounds, would it be enough? Pichardo's 17.52 m (57 ft 5 3/4 in) in the fifth round was long but meaningless. In the final round, defending champion and reigning Olympic champion Christian Taylor made his best effort to get on the medal stand, but 17.20 m (56 ft 5 in) was only good enough for fourth place. With Pichardo holding the last attempt, Tamgho had to make sure. His 18.04 m (59 ft 2 in) world leader and personal best left no doubt. It increased his standing as the third best performer ever and moved him up as the third member of the 18-meter club. Pichardo's 16.98 m (55 ft 8 1/2 in) couldn't compete with that.

== Records ==
Prior to the competition, the records were as follows:

World record	Jonathan Edwards (GBR)	18.29	Gothenburg, Sweden	7 August 1995
Championship record	Jonathan Edwards (GBR)	18.29	Göteborg, Sweden	7 August 1995
World leading	Pedro Pablo Pichardo (CUB)	17.69	La Habana, Cuba	4 June 2013
African record	Tarik Bouguetaïb (MAR)	17.37	Khemisset, Morocco	14 July 2007
Asian record	Li Yanxi (CHN)	17.59	Jinan, People's Republic of China	26 October 2009
North, Central American and Caribbean record	Kenny Harrison (USA)	18.09	Atlanta, United States	27 July 1996
South American record	Jadel Gregório (BRA)	17.90	Belém, Brazil	20 May 2007
European record	Jonathan Edwards (GBR)	18.29	Göteborg, Sweden	7 August 1995
Oceanian record	Ken Lorraway (AUS)	17.46	London, Great Britain	7 August 1982

== Qualification standards ==
A result	B result
17.20	16.85

== Schedule ==
Date	Time	Round
16 August 2013	10:00	Qualification
18 August 2013	16:45	Final

All times are local times (UTC+4)

== Results ==
KEY:	Q	Qualified	q	12 best performers	NR	National record	PB	Personal best	SB	Seasonal best

=== Qualification ===
Qualification: Qualifying Performance 17.05 (Q) or at least 12 best performers (q) advanced to the final.

Rank	Group	Name	Nationality	No. 1	No. 2	No. 3	Result	Notes
1	A	Teddy Tamgho	France	x	17.41		17.41	Q
2	B	Yoann Rapinier	France	16.79	17.39		17.39	Q
3	B	Christian Taylor	United States	17.36			17.36	Q
4	A	Will Claye	United States	16.81	17.08		17.08	Q
5	B	Pedro Pablo Pichardo	Cuba	17.06			17.06	Q
6	A	Dong Bin	China	x	x	16.98	16.98	q
7	A	Marian Oprea	Romania	16.91	x	x	16.91	q
8	B	Samyr Lainé	Haiti	16.87	16.54		16.87	q
9	B	Fabrizio Schembri	Italy	16.57	16.83		16.83	q
10	B	Aleksey Fedorov	Russia	x	15.98	16.83	16.83	q
11	B	Dimitrios Tsiamis	Greece	16.69	16.06	16.47	16.69	q
12	A	Gaëtan Saku Bafuanga Baya	France	16.63	16.37	15.91	16.63	q
13	A	Renjith Maheshwary	India	16.08	16.63	16.28	16.63	
14	B	Viktor Kuznyetsov	Ukraine	16.50	16.60	x	16.60	
15	A	Fabrizio Donato	Italy	x	16.20	16.53	16.53	
16	A	Jefferson Sabino	Brazil	x	16.49	16.05	16.49	
17	B	Roman Valiyev	Kazakhstan	16.34	16.43	15.97	16.43	
18	B	Omar Craddock	United States	14.91	16.18	16.40	16.40	
19	A	Zlatozar Atanasov	Bulgaria	16.16	16.04	16.21	16.21	
20	B	Jonathan Drack	Mauritius	x	14.89	15.54	15.54	
	A	Daniele Greco	Italy	–	–	–	DNF	
	A	Tosin Oke	Nigeria				DNS	

=== Final ===
The final was started at 16:45.

Rank	Name	Nationality	No. 1	No. 2	No. 3	No. 4	No. 5	No. 6	Result	Notes
1st place, gold medalist(s)	Teddy Tamgho	France	17.65	x	x	17.68	x	18.04	18.04	WL
2nd place, silver medalist(s)	Pedro Pablo Pichardo	Cuba	17.38	17.68	x	17.22	17.52	16.98	17.68	
3rd place, bronze medalist(s)	Will Claye	United States	17.19	17.33	17.52	17.38	16.94	17.46	17.52	SB
4	Christian Taylor	United States	16.99	x	16.49	16.69	17.13	17.20	17.20	
5	Aleksey Fedorov	Russia	16.34	16.90	x	16.79	x	16.42	16.90	
6	Marian Oprea	Romania	16.82	x	16.59	x	x	x	16.82	
7	Gaëtan Saku Bafuanga Baya	France	16.64	16.79	15.97	16.70	16.64	16.24	16.79	
8	Fabrizio Schembri	Italy	x	16.61	16.74	x	16.00	x	16.74	
9	Dong Bin	China	x	16.65	16.73				16.73	
10	Dimitrios Tsiamis	Greece	16.66	x	16.38				16.66	
11	Samyr Lainé	Haiti	x	16.09	x				16.09	
12	Yoann Rapinier	France	13.98	x	15.17				15.17	
