= Montserrat at the 2025 World Athletics Championships =

- Flag of Montserrat
- WA code: MNT

in Tokyo, Japan 13 September 2025 – 21 September 2025
- Competitors: 1 (1 man and 0 women)
- Medals: Gold 0 Silver 0 Bronze 0 Total 0

World Athletics Championships appearances (overview)
- 1983; 1987; 1991; 1993; 1995; 1997; 1999; 2001; 2003–2005; 2007; 2009–2011; 2013; 2015; 2017; 2019–2023; 2025

Montserrat competed at the 2025 World Athletics Championships in Tokyo, Japan, which were held from 13 to 21 September 2025. The athlete delegation of the territory consisted of sprinter Sanjay Weekes. He competed in the men's 100 metres and failed to advance further from the preliminaries of the event.

== Background ==
The 2025 World Athletics Championships in Tokyo, Japan, were held from 19 to 27 August 2023. The Championships were held at the Japan National Stadium. To qualify for the World Championships, athletes had to reach an entry standard (e.g. time or distance), place in a specific position at select competitions, be a wild card entry, or qualify through their World Athletics Ranking at the end of the qualification period.

As the Montserrat did not meet any of the four standards, the Montserrat Amateur Athletic Association could send either one male or one female athlete in one event of the Championships who has not yet qualified. The Association selected sprinter Sanjay Weekes. This was Weekes' first appearance for Montserrat at an edition of the Championships. In the lead-up to the Championships, Weekes sustained a quadriceps injury from two months before. This was Montserrat's first appearance at the World Athletics Championships since they had an athlete entered for the 2017 World Championships in Athletics.

== Results ==
Key

- Q = Qualified for the next round
- q = Qualified for the next round as a fastest loser or, in field events, by position without achieving the qualifying target
- NR = National record
- PB = Personal best
- SB = Season best
- N/A = Round not applicable for the event

=== Men ===
Weekes competed in the preliminaries of the men's 100 metres on 13 September. He competed in the first heat against eight other competitors. There, he recorded a time of 11.08 seconds and placed fourth, failing to advance further into the first round. After the Championships, Weekes stated that he was to focus on recovery and training for future competition.

Track and road events

Athlete	Event	Preliminary		Heat		Semifinal		Final	
Athlete	Event	Result	Rank	Result	Rank	Result	Rank	Result	Rank
Sanjay Weekes	100 metres	11.08	4	Did not advance					
