= 2013 World Championships in Athletics – Men's 3000 metres steeplechase =

Men's 3000 metres steeplechase at the 2013 World Championships
- Venue: Luzhniki Stadium
- Dates: 12 August (heats); 15 August (final)
- Competitors: 40 from 20 nations
- Winning time: 8:06.01

Medalists
gold medal	Ezekiel Kemboi; Kenya
silver medal	Conseslus Kipruto; Kenya
bronze medal	Mahiedine Mekhissi-Benabbad; France

Official Video

The men's 3000 metres steeplechase at the 2013 World Championships in Athletics was held at the Luzhniki Stadium on 12 and 15 August.

The final was, as expected, led by the Kenyan team. With multiple Olympic and returning World Champion Ezekiel Kemboi, they were at the front with the rest of the field strung out behind them. For the first four laps, Conseslus Kipruto did the majority of the leading, with the rest of the Kenyans, then both Ugandans behind. Occasionally Mahiedine Mekhissi-Benabbad would pass one of the Ugandan athletes. With three laps to go, things began to shake up. Paul Kipsiele Koech moved into the lead and at about the same time Noureddine Smaïl moved from the middle of the pack along the outside into third place. As the pace quickened, the Ugandans disappeared, replaced by the two Frenchmen and Evan Jager as contenders behind the Kenyan gauntlet. Over the next half lap, the pace quickened, Smai'l disappeared and Matthew Hughes of Canada emerged. Going into the last lap, Conseslus Kipruto and Koech were in the lead with Kemboi behind them followed by Mekhissi and Jager. Menkhissi moved along the outside, with about 200 meters to go, passed Kemboi, then Koech and was even with Kipruto. But behind him, Kemboi moved into a different gear. Taking the barrier at the end of the straight in full hurdle stride, in the next 50 meters before the water jump, Kemboi went around the outside and took the lead. Mekhissi was next over the water jump with Kipruto scrambling to make up ground. In full sprint, Kipruto went around Mekhissi but didn't negotiate the last barrier as well as Kemboi. Regaining his balance he again sprinted making up significant ground on his more experienced teammate, but it was not enough to get gold. Make that three straight for Kemboi, along with two Olympic gold medals unbeaten in the World Championships since he finished second to a different Kipruto in 2007. In all, three golds, three silvers and nothing worse in the World Championships since 2003. Mekhissi repeats his bronze medal.

== Records ==
Prior to the competition, the records were as follows:

World record	Saif Saaeed Shaheen (QAT)	7:53.63	Brussels, Belgium	3 September 2004
Championship record	Ezekiel Kemboi (KEN)	8:00.43	Berlin, Germany	18 August 2009
World Leading	Ezekiel Kemboi (KEN)	7:59.03	Saint-Denis, France	6 July 2013
African Record	Brimin Kiprop Kipruto (KEN)	7:53.64	Monaco	22 July 2011
Asian Record	Saif Saaeed Shaheen (QAT)	7:53.63	Brussels, Belgium	3 September 2004
North, Central American and Caribbean record	Evan Jager (USA)	8:06.81	Monaco	20 July 2012
South American Record	Wander do Prado Moura (BRA)	8:14.41	Mar del Plata, Argentina	22 March 1995
European Record	Mahiedine Mekhissi-Benabbad (FRA)	8:00.09	Saint-Denis, France	6 July 2013
Oceanian record	Peter Renner (NZL)	8:14.05	Koblenz, West Germany	29 August 1984

== Qualification standards ==
A time	B time
8:26.10	8:32.00

== Schedule ==
Date	Time	Round
12 August 2013	10:10	Heats
15 August 2013	20:20	Final

All times are local times (UTC+4)

== Results ==
KEY:	q	Fastest non-qualifiers	Q	Qualified	NR	National record	PB	Personal best	SB	Seasonal best

=== Heats ===
Qualification: First 3 in each heat (Q) and the next 6 fastest (q) advanced to the final.

Rank	Heat	Name	Nationality	Time	Notes
1	1	Mahiedine Mekhissi-Benabbad	France	8:15.43	Q
2	1	Matthew Hughes	Canada	8:16.93	Q, PB
3	1	Abel Mutai	Kenya	8:19.15	Q
4	1	Ángel Mullera	Spain	8:19.26	q, SB
5	1	Ion Luchianov	Moldova	8:19.64	q, SB
6	1	Benjamin Kiplagat	Uganda	8:21.14	q
7	3	Conseslus Kipruto	Kenya	8:22.31	Q
8	3	Paul Kipsiele Koech	Kenya	8:22.88	Q
9	3	Yoann Kowal	France	8:23.74	Q
10	2	Evan Jager	United States	8:23.76	Q
11	2	Ezekiel Kemboi	Kenya	8:23.84	Q
12	2	Noureddine Smaïl	France	8:24.05	Q
13	3	Hamid Ezzine	Morocco	8:24.35	q
14	2	Jacob Araptany	Uganda	8:24.53	q
15	2	Alex Genest	Canada	8:24.56	q
16	2	José Peña	Venezuela	8:24.88	
17	1	Abdelmadjed Touil	Algeria	8:25.89	
18	2	Steffen Uliczka	Germany	8:28.32	
19	3	De'Sean Turner	United States	8:28.44	
20	3	Hicham Bouchicha	Algeria	8:28.56	
21	1	Ilgizar Safiullin	Russia	8:28.65	PB
22	3	Habtamu Fayisa	Ethiopia	8:29.08	
23	3	Chris Winter	Canada	8:29.36	
24	3	Mitko Tsenov	Bulgaria	8:32.49	
25	3	Sebastián Martos	Spain	8:32.63	
26	2	Roberto Alaiz	Spain	8:33.32	
27	1	Vadym Slobodenyuk	Ukraine	8:33.60	
28	1	Tareq Mubarak Taher	Bahrain	8:34.32	SB
29	1	Mateusz Demczyszak	Poland	8:34.60	
30	3	Tarık Langat Akdağ	Turkey	8:34.97	
31	2	James Wilkinson	Great Britain & N.I.	8:35.07	
32	1	Jaouad Chemlal	Morocco	8:36.29	
33	3	Patrick Nasti	Italy	8:36.42	
34	1	Daniel Huling	United States	8:37.80	
35	2	Roba Gari	Ethiopia	8:45.06	
	1	Yuri Floriani	Italy	DQ	R 163.3
	2	Jamel Chatbi	Italy	DQ	R 163.3
	2	Abdelhamid Zerrifi	Algeria	DQ	R 163.3
	3	Krystian Zalewski	Poland	DQ	R 163.3
	2	Mohammed Boulama	Morocco	DNF	
	3	Timothy Toroitich	Uganda	DNS	

=== Final ===
The final was started at 20:20.

Rank	Name	Nationality	Time	Notes
1st place, gold medalist(s)	Ezekiel Kemboi	Kenya	8:06.01	
2nd place, silver medalist(s)	Conseslus Kipruto	Kenya	8:06.37	
3rd place, bronze medalist(s)	Mahiedine Mekhissi-Benabbad	France	8:07.86	
4	Paul Kipsiele Koech	Kenya	8:08.62	
5	Evan Jager	United States	8:08.67	
6	Matthew Hughes	Canada	8:11.64	NR
7	Abel Mutai	Kenya	8:17.04	
8	Yoann Kowal	France	8:17.41	
9	Hamid Ezzine	Morocco	8:19.53	
10	Ion Luchianov	Moldova	8:19.99	
11	Ángel Mullera	Spain	8:20.93	
12	Jacob Araptany	Uganda	8:25.86	
13	Alex Genest	Canada	8:27.01	
14	Benjamin Kiplagat	Uganda	8:31.09	
	Noureddine Smaïl	France	DNF	
