= Ukraine at the 2013 World Championships in Athletics =

- WA code: UKR
- National federation: Ukrainian Athletic Federation
- Website: www.uaf.org.ua

in (Russia) Moscow 10 August 2013 – 18 August 2013
- Competitors: 58 (26 men and 32 women)
- Medals Ranked 9th: Gold 2 Silver 0 Bronze 2 Total 4

World Championships in Athletics appearances
- 1993; 1995; 1997; 1999; 2001; 2003; 2005; 2007; 2009; 2011; 2013; 2015; 2017; 2019; 2022; 2023; 2025

Ukraine competed at the 2013 World Championships in Athletics in Moscow, Russia, from 10 to 18 August 2013.

A team of 60 athletes was announced to represent the country in the event. Among those announced two athletes (Emil Ibrahimov and Viktorya Pyatachenko) were not included to the starting lists narrowing the list of athletes, who actually participated in the relevant events, to 58.

== Medallists ==
The following Ukrainian competitors won medals at the Championships

Medal	Name	Event	Date
Gold	Hanna Melnychenko	Heptathlon	13 August
Bronze	Ihor Hlavan	50 kilometers walk	14 August
Gold	Bohdan Bondarenko	High jump	15 August
Bronze	Olha Saladukha	Triple jump	15 August

== Results ==
Disqualified due to violation of anti-doping rules

=== Men ===
==== Track and road events ====
Athlete	Event	Heats		Semifinals		Final	
Athlete	Event	Result	Rank	Result	Rank	Result	Rank
Serhiy Smelyk	200 metres	20.52 PB	12	20.42 PB	10	Did not advance	
Taras Bybyk	800 metres	1:49.39	37	Did not advance			
Vadym Slobodenyuk	3000 metres steeplechase	8:33.60	27	Did not advance			
Ruslan Perestyuk; Serhiy Smelyk; Ihor Bodrov; Vitaliy Korzh	4 × 100 metres relay	38.57	12			Did not advance	
Volodymyr Burakov; Vitaliy Butrym; Yevhen Hutsol; Myhaylo Knysh	4 × 400 metres relay	3:04.98 SB	20			Did not advance	
Vasyl Matviychuk	Marathon					2:26:21 SB	41
Ruslan Dmytrenko	20 kilometres walk					1:22:14	7
Ivan Losev	20 kilometres walk					1:26:32	30
Ivan Banzeruk	50 kilometres walk					DQ	
Serhiy Budza	50 kilometres walk					3:47:36 PB	12
Ihor Hlavan	50 kilometres walk					3:40:39 NR	3rd place, bronze medalist(s)

==== Field events ====
Athlete	Event	Qualification		Final	
Athlete	Event	Result	Rank	Result	Rank
Viktor Kuznyetsov	Triple jump	16.60	14	Did not advance	
Bohdan Bondarenko	High jump	2.29	1	2.41 CR NR	Gold
Yuriy Krymarenko	High jump	2.22	19	Did not advance	
Andriy Protsenko	High jump	2.22	23	Did not advance	
Oleksandr Korchmid	Pole vault	5.40	14	Did not advance	
Vladyslav Revenko	Pole vault	5.40	21	Did not advance	
Ivan Yeryomin	Pole vault	5.40	19	Did not advance	
Roman Avramenko	Javelin throw	DQ		DQ	
Yevhen Vynohradov	Hammer throw	72.90	18	Did not advance	

==== Decathlon ====
Athlete	Event	Results	Points	Rank
Oleksiy Kasyanov
Oleksiy Kasyanov	100 m	10.99 SB	863	17
Oleksiy Kasyanov	Long jump	7.27	878	21
Oleksiy Kasyanov	Shot put	14.05	731	18
Oleksiy Kasyanov	High jump	1.90 SB	714	26
Oleksiy Kasyanov	400 m	49.75 SB	826	20
Oleksiy Kasyanov	110 m hurdles	DNF	0	
Oleksiy Kasyanov	Discus throw	NM		
Oleksiy Kasyanov	Pole vault	DNS		
Oleksiy Kasyanov	Javelin throw	DNS		
Oleksiy Kasyanov	1500 m	DNS		
Total			DNF	

=== Women ===
==== Track and road events ====
Athlete	Event	Heats		Semifinals		Final	
Athlete	Event	Result	Rank	Result	Rank	Result	Rank
Natalia Pohrebniak	100 metres	11.28	16	11.36	18	Did not advance	
Olesya Povkh	100 metres	11.41	23	11.43	22	Did not advance	
Elyzaveta Bryzgina	200 metres	DQ		DQ		Did not advance	
Mariya Ryemyen	200 metres	22.63	2	22.70	6	22.84	7
Khrystyna Stuy	200 metres	22.86 SB	12	22.98	13	Did not advance	
Nataliia Pygyda	400 metres	51.17 SB	9	51.02 PB	11	Did not advance	
Nataliia Lupu	800 metres	1:59.59 SB	5	1:59.43 SB	3	1:59.79	7
Olha Lyakhova	800 metres	2:00.98	18	Did not advance			
Anna Plotitsyna	100 metres hurdle	13.30	27	Did not advance			
Hanna Titimets	400 metres hurdles	DQ		DQ		DQ	
Hanna Yaroshchuk	400 metres hurdles	55.73	11	54.92	6	55.01	5
Valentyna Zhudina	3000 metres steeplechase	9:37.79	11			9:33.73	7
Olesya Povkh; Natalia Pohrebniak; Mariya Ryemyen; Elyzaveta Bryzgina	4 × 100 metres relay	43.12	10			Did not advance	
Daryna Prystupa; Olha Zemlyak; Alina Logvynenko; Nataliia Pygyda	4 × 400 metres relay	3:29.63	7			3:27.38 SB	5
Kateryna Karmanenko	Marathon					2:48:18 SB	31
Olha Iakovenko	20 kilometres walk					1:39:58	53
Lyudmyla Olyanovska	20 kilometres walk					1:30:48	12
Olena Shumkina	20 kilometres walk					DQ	

==== Field events ====
Athlete	Event	Qualification		Final	
Athlete	Event	Result	Rank	Result	Rank
Maryna Bekh	Long jump	6.31	25	Did not advance	
Anna Kornuta	Long jump	6.53	13	Did not advance	
Olha Saladukha	Triple jump	14.69	1	14.65	3rd place, bronze medalist(s)
Ruslana Tsykhotska	Triple jump	13.51	15	Did not advance	
Oksana Okuneva	High jump	1.88	15	Did not advance	
Olha Holodna	Shot put	17.21	20	Did not advance	
Galyna Obleshchuk	Shot put	18.04	9	18.08	8
Natalia Semenova	Discus throw	55.79	22	Did not advance	
Marharyta Dorozhon	Javelin throw	58.23	19	Did not advance	
Hanna Hatsko	Javelin throw	58.63	18	Did not advance	
Vira Rebryk	Javelin throw	61.70	10	58.33	11
Iryna Sekachova	Hammer throw	DNS		Did not advance	

==== Heptathlon ====
Athlete	Event	Results	Points	Rank
Hanna Melnichenko	100 m hurdles	13.29	1081	2
Hanna Melnichenko	High jump	1.86	1054	3
Hanna Melnichenko	Shot put	13.85	784	7
Hanna Melnichenko	200 m	23.87	993	4
Hanna Melnichenko	Long jump	6.49	1004	3
Hanna Melnichenko	Javelin throw	41.87	703	16
Hanna Melnichenko	800 m	2:09.85	967	7
Total			6586	1st place, gold medalist(s)
