= Yoann Rapinier =

French triple jumper

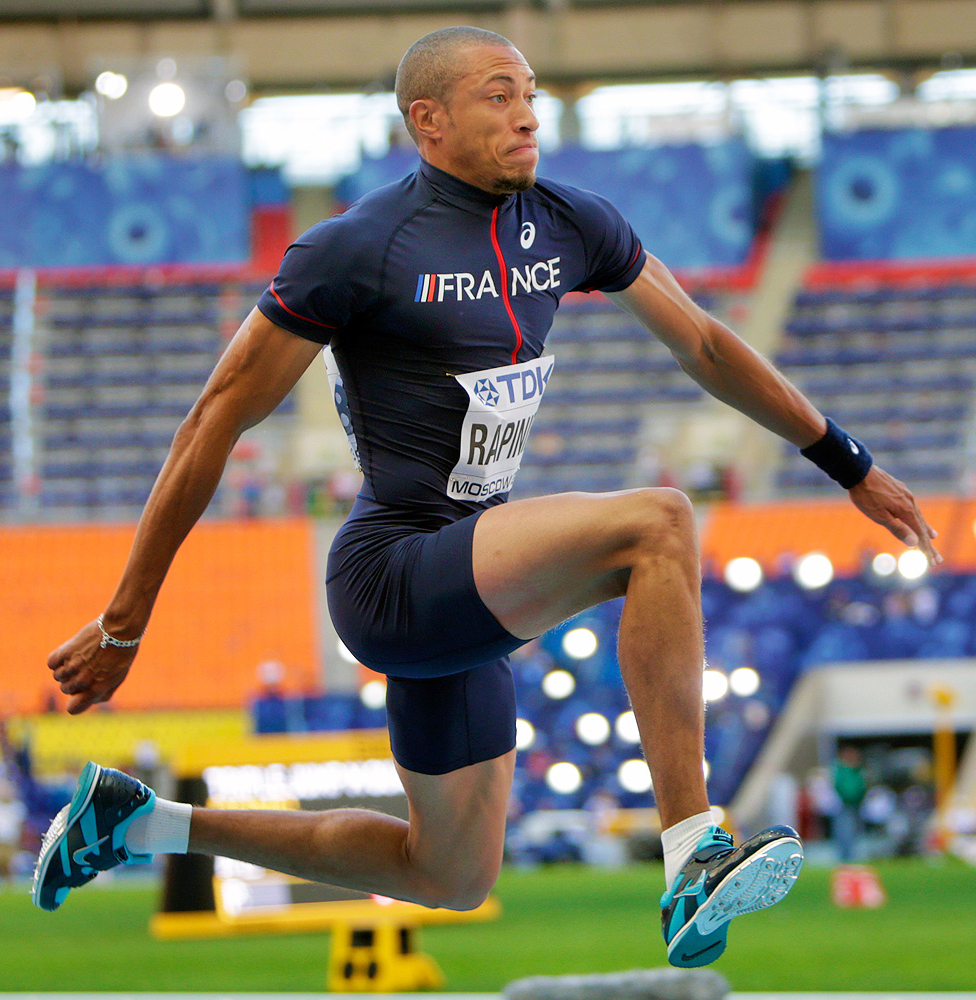
- Rapinier at 2013 World Championships

Personal information
- Born: 29 September 1989 (age 37) Pontoise, France
- Height: 186 cm (6 ft 1 in)
- Weight: 78 kg (172 lb)

Sport
- Country: France
- Sport: Athletics (track and field)
- Event: Triple jump
- Coached by: Mickael Hanany; Gaetan Saku Bafuanga

Yoann Rapinier (born 29 September 1989 in Pontoise) is a French triple jumper of Martiniquan descent.

== Achievements ==
Year	Competition	Venue	Position	Event	Notes
Representing France
2009	European U23 Championships	Kaunas, Lithuania	9th	Triple jump	16.23 m (wind: 0.9 m/s)
2011	European Indoor Championships	Paris, France	4th	Triple jump	17.23 m
2011	European U23 Championships	Ostrava, Czech Republic	–	Triple jump	NM
2013	World Championships	Moscow, Russia	12th	Triple jump	15.17 m
2013	Jeux de la Francophonie	Nice, France	1st	Triple jump	17.11 m
2014	European Championships	Zürich, Switzerland	4th	Triple jump	17.01 m
2019	European Indoor Championships	Glasgow, United Kingdom	4th	Triple jump	16.72 m
