= 2013 World Championships in Athletics – Women's 200 metres =

Women's 200 metres at the 2013 World Championships
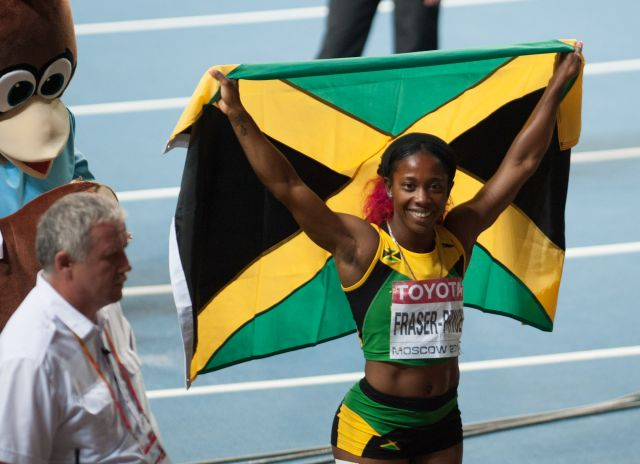
- Gold medalist Shelly-Ann Fraser-Pryce
- Venue: Luzhniki Stadium
- Dates: 15 August (heats); 15 August (semifinals); 16 August (final)
- Competitors: 49 from 34 nations
- Winning time: 22.17

Medalists
gold medal	Shelly-Ann Fraser-Pryce; Jamaica
silver medal	Murielle Ahouré; Ivory Coast
bronze medal	Blessing Okagbare; Nigeria

The women's 200 metres at the 2013 World Championships in Athletics was held at the Luzhniki Stadium on 15–16 August.

Before the race, without her nemesis of the last 8 years, Veronica Campbell-Brown, Allyson Felix came into this race as the favorite. She had won three gold medals in a row, but that streak was interrupted by Campbell Brown. Felix was back to start a new streak. But she was not without challengers, Shelly-Ann Fraser-Pryce was just two-tenths behind her at the previous Olympics and like the previous two Olympics, Fraser-Pryce had already won the 100. And Kimberlyn Duncan had actually beaten Felix at the American Championships, but after a long college season, she didn't make it to the final.

At the gun, Fraser-Pryce was out quick, making up the stagger on Blessing Okagbare to her outside halfway through the turn. The pressure was on, Fraser-Pryce was pulling away and before the turn was over, Felix was rolling to the ground with a pulled hamstring. Jeneba Tarmoh and Murielle Ahouré were the next best to the straight, Okagbare a step back. As Tarmoh faded, Okagbare managed to pass Ahouré, but Ahouré came back. As the two battled, they were gaining on Fraser-Pryce, but not enough to make a dent in her huge lead. After giving up .026 to Okagbare in reaction time at the start, Ahouré beat her by .008 to take silver, with nobody else close to the medalists.

Two sprinters, Turkmenistan's Yelena Ryabova and Ukraine's Yelyzaveta Bryzhina, gave positive drug tests at the competition.

== Records ==
Prior to the competition, the records were as follows:

World record	Florence Griffith-Joyner (USA)	21.34	Seoul, South Korea	29 September 1988
Championship record	Silke Gladisch-Möller (GDR)	21.74	Rome, Italy	3 September 1987
World Leading	Shelly-Ann Fraser-Pryce (JAM)	22.13	Kingston, Jamaica	23 June 2013
African record	Mary Onyali-Omagbemi (NGR)	22.07	Zürich, Switzerland	14 August 1996
Asian record	Li Xuemei (CHN)	22.01	Shanghai, People's Republic of China	22 October 1997
North, Central American and Caribbean record	Florence Griffith-Joyner (USA)	21.34	Seoul, South Korea	29 September 1988
South American record	Ana Claudia Silva (BRA)	22.48	São Paulo, Brazil	6 August 2011
European record	Marita Koch (GDR)	21.71	Karl-Marx-Stadt, East Germany	10 June 1979
European record	Marita Koch (GDR)	21.71	Potsdam, East Germany	21 July 1984
European record	Heike Drechsler (GDR)	21.71	Jena, East Germany	29 June 1986
European record	Heike Drechsler (GDR)	21.71	Stuttgart, West Germany	29 August 1986
Oceanian record	Melinda Gainsford-Taylor (AUS)	22.23	Stuttgart, Germany	13 July 1997

== Qualification standards ==
A time	B time
23.05	23.30

== Schedule ==
Date	Time	Round
15 August 2013	10:55	Heats
15 August 2013	19:45	Semifinals
16 August 2013	21:15	Final

All times are local times (UTC+4)

== Results ==
KEY:	Q	Qualified	q	Fastest non-qualifiers	NR	National record	PB	Personal best	SB	Seasonal best

=== Heats ===
Qualification: First 3 in each heat (Q) and the next 3 fastest (q) advanced to the semifinals.

Wind: Heat 1: 0.0 m/s, Heat 2: +0.1 m/s, Heat 3: 0.0 m/s, Heat 4: 0.0 m/s, Heat 5: −0.1 m/s, Heat 6: +0.3 m/s, Heat 7: +0.4 m/s

Rank	Heat	Lane	Name	Nationality	Time	Notes
1	6	5	Allyson Felix	United States	22.59	Q
2	5	5	Mariya Ryemyen	Ukraine	22.63	Q
3	5	8	Anthonique Strachan	Bahamas	22.66	Q
3	7	7	Murielle Ahouré	Ivory Coast	22.66	Q
5	3	6	Shaunae Miller	Bahamas	22.72	Q
6	6	3	Anneisha McLaughlin	Jamaica	22.78	Q
6	4	4	Shelly-Ann Fraser-Pryce	Jamaica	22.78	Q
8	2	5	Blessing Okagbare	Nigeria	22.79	Q
9	2	3	Charonda Williams	United States	22.83	Q
9	6	4	Myriam Soumaré	France	22.83	Q
11	1	4	Kimberlyn Duncan	United States	22.84	Q
12	7	8	Hrystyna Stuy	Ukraine	22.86	Q, SB
13	7	3	Jeneba Tarmoh	United States	22.88	Q
14	5	2	Lénora Guion-Firmin	France	22.91	Q, PB
15	7	5	Ivet Lalova	Bulgaria	22.92	q
16	6	7	Jodie Williams	Great Britain & N.I.	23.00	q
16	1	5	Johanna Danois	France	23.00	Q
18	7	6	Mariely Sánchez	Dominican Republic	23.05	q
19	1	6	Hanna-Maari Latvala	Finland	23.07	Q
20	1	7	Gloria Hooper	Italy	23.10	SB
21	4	8	Kai Selvon	Trinidad and Tobago	23.14	Q
22	2	6	Kimberly Hyacinthe	Canada	23.19	Q
23	4	6	Franciela Krasucki	Brazil	23.20	
24	2	7	Marika Popowicz	Poland	23.22	SB
25	7	2	Mujinga Kambundji	Switzerland	23.24	PB
26	6	8	Nivea Smith	Bahamas	23.25	
26	3	7	Patricia Hall	Jamaica	23.25	Q
28	6	2	Elizabeta Savlinis	Russia	23.27	
29	1	8	Ana Cláudia Lemos	Brazil	23.31	
30	1	2	Moa Hjelmer	Sweden	23.33	
31	5	3	Anyika Onuora	Great Britain & N.I.	23.36	
32	3	4	Maria Belibasaki	Greece	23.41	Q
33	2	8	Kineke Alexander	Saint Vincent and the Grenadines	23.42	
34	4	2	Justine Palframan	South Africa	23.64	
35	5	6	Olga Safronova	Kazakhstan	23.83	
36	3	2	Andreea Ogrăzeanu	Romania	23.83	
37	4	5	Chisato Fukushima	Japan	23.85	
38	4	3	Melissa Breen	Australia	23.95	
39	7	4	Karene King	British Virgin Islands	23.97	
40	3	1	Isidora Jiménez	Chile	24.06	
41	1	3	Janet Amponsah	Ghana	24.07	
41	5	4	Eleni Artymata	Cyprus	24.07	
43	5	7	Toea Wisil	Papua New Guinea	24.13	
44	2	2	Viktoriya Zyabkina	Kazakhstan	24.47	
45	6	6	Dana Hussain	Iraq	24.57	
46	3	3	Afa Ismail	Maldives	26.21	SB
	3	8	Crystal Emmanuel	Canada	DQ	163.3(a)
—N/a	4	7	~~Yelyzaveta Bryzhina~~	~~Ukraine~~	~~22.84~~	DQ
—N/a	3	5	~~Yelena Ryabova~~	~~Turkmenistan~~	~~24.61~~	DQ
	2	4	Ángela Tenorio	Ecuador	DNS	

=== Semifinals ===
Qualification: First 2 in each heat (Q) and the next 2 fastest (q) advanced to the final.

Wind: Heat 1: 0.0 m/s, Heat 2: 0.0 m/s, Heat 3: −0.2 m/s

Rank	Heat	Lane	Name	Nationality	Time	Notes
1	2	3	Allyson Felix	United States	22.30	Q, SB
2	2	4	Blessing Okagbare	Nigeria	22.39	Q
3	1	4	Murielle Ahouré	Ivory Coast	22.46	Q
4	3	4	Shelly-Ann Fraser-Pryce	Jamaica	22.54	Q
5	1	6	Shaunae Miller	Bahamas	22.66	Q
6	1	8	Jeneba Tarmoh	United States	22.70	q, SB
6	3	5	Mariya Ryemyen	Ukraine	22.70	Q
8	3	6	Charonda Williams	United States	22.80	q
9	3	3	Anthonique Strachan	Bahamas	22.81	
9	1	2	Ivet Lalova	Bulgaria	22.81	
11	3	8	Myriam Soumaré	France	22.85	
12	2	6	Kimberlyn Duncan	United States	22.91	
13	2	5	Hrystyna Stuy	Ukraine	22.98	
14	2	2	Mariely Sánchez	Dominican Republic	23.05	
15	2	7	Lénora Guion-Firmin	France	23.11	
16	3	1	Kimberly Hyacinthe	Canada	23.12	
17	1	7	Johanna Danois	France	23.15	
18	2	1	Kai Selvon	Trinidad and Tobago	23.21	
18	3	2	Jodie Williams	Great Britain & N.I.	23.21	
18	3	7	Hanna-Maari Latvala	Finland	23.21	
21	2	8	Patricia Hall	Jamaica	23.26	
22	1	1	Maria Belibasaki	Greece	23.46	
23	1	3	Anneisha McLaughlin	Jamaica	27.13	
—N/a	1	5	~~Yelyzaveta Bryzhina~~	~~Ukraine~~	~~22.87~~	DQ

=== Final ===
The final was started at 21:15.

Rank	Lane	Name	Nationality	Time	Notes
1st place, gold medalist(s)	4	Shelly-Ann Fraser-Pryce	Jamaica	22.17	
2nd place, silver medalist(s)	6	Murielle Ahouré	Ivory Coast	22.32	
3rd place, bronze medalist(s)	5	Blessing Okagbare	Nigeria	22.32	
4	7	Shaunae Miller	Bahamas	22.74	
5	1	Jeneba Tarmoh	United States	22.78	
6	2	Charonda Williams	United States	22.81	
7	8	Mariya Ryemyen	Ukraine	22.84	
	3	Allyson Felix	United States	DNF	
