= Pelle Rietveld =

Dutch decathlete

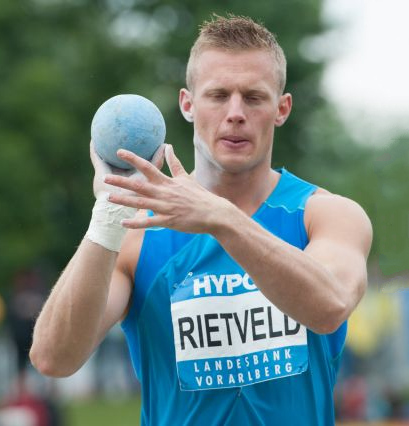
- Palle Rietveld at the 2013 Hypo-Meeting in Götzis, Austria.

Personal information
- Born: February 4, 1985 (age 40) Boskoop, South Holland, Netherlands
- Height: 1.85 m (6 ft 1 in)
- Weight: 82 kg (181 lb)

Sport
- Country: Netherlands
- Sport: Athletics
- Event: Decathlon

Pelle Rietveld (born 4 February 1985, in Boskoop) is a Dutch decathlete. He competed at the 2013 World Championships in Moscow, Russia. He is also a very good javelin thrower with a PB of 71.66 metres. Right now he is the trainer from Nadine Broersen.

== Competition record ==
Year	Competition	Venue	Position	Event	Notes
Representing the Netherlands
2003	European Junior Championships	Tampere, Finland	5th	Decathlon (junior)	7390 pts
2004	World Junior Championships	Grosseto, Italy	4th	Decathlon (junior)	7822 pts
2005	European U23 Championships	Erfurt, Germany	14th	Decathlon	7308 pts
2007	European U23 Championships	Debrecen, Hungary	5th	Decathlon	7955 pts
2012	European Championships	Helsinki, Finland	–	Decathlon	DNF
2013	European Indoor Championships	Gothenburg, Sweden	8th	Heptathlon	5906 pts
2013	World Championships	Moscow, Russia	21st	Decathlon	7840 pts
2014	European Championships	Zürich, Switzerland	–	Decathlon	DNF
