= 2000 European Athletics Indoor Championships – Women's 60 metres =

The women's 60 metres event at the 2000 European Athletics Indoor Championships was held on February 26–27.

== Medalists ==
Gold	Silver	Bronze
Ekaterini Thanou; Greece	Petya Pendareva; Bulgaria	Iryna Pukha; Ukraine

== Results ==
=== Heats ===
First 3 of each heat (Q) and the next 4 fastest (q) qualified for the semifinals.

Rank	Heat	Name	Nationality	Time	Notes
1	4	Ekaterini Thanou	Greece	7.13	Q
2	3	Petya Pendareva	Bulgaria	7.19	Q
3	3	Saša Prokofijev	Slovenia	7.26	Q, PB
4	1	Iryna Pukha	Ukraine	7.27	Q
4	2	Anzhela Kravchenko	Ukraine	7.27	Q
4	3	Manuela Levorato	Italy	7.27	Q
7	3	Sandra Citte	France	7.28	q
8	1	Marina Kislova	Russia	7.29	Q
9	2	Alenka Bikar	Slovenia	7.30	Q
10	1	Kim Gevaert	Belgium	7.31	Q
10	4	Marion Wagner	Germany	7.31	Q, SB
12	4	Karin Mayr	Austria	7.32	Q
13	1	Marcia Richardson	Great Britain	7.34	q
14	3	Joice Maduaka	Great Britain	7.36	q
15	3	Sanna Kyllönen	Finland	7.36	q
16	2	Andrea Philipp	Germany	7.37	Q
16	2	Frédérique Bangué	France	7.37	
16	4	Carmen Blay	Spain	7.37	SB
19	4	Oksana Guskova	Ukraine	7.38	
20	2	Paraskevi Patoulidou	Greece	7.39	
21	4	Johanna Manninen	Finland	7.40	
22	1	Marzena Pawlak	Poland	7.43	
22	2	Katleen De Caluwé	Belgium	7.43	
24	1	Annika Amundin	Sweden	7.44	
25	3	Panayiota Koutrouli	Greece	7.49	
26	3	Gloria Gatti	San Marino	7.93	NR
	1	Nora Güner	Turkey	DNS	
	2	Natalya Ignatova	Russia	DNS	
	4	Zuzanna Radecka	Poland	DNS	

=== Semifinals ===
First 4 of each semifinals qualified directly (Q) for the final.

Rank	Heat	Name	Nationality	Time	Notes
1	1	Ekaterini Thanou	Greece	7.12	Q
2	1	Iryna Pukha	Ukraine	7.13	Q
3	2	Petya Pendareva	Bulgaria	7.15	Q
4	2	Anzhela Kravchenko	Ukraine	7.21	Q
5	2	Alenka Bikar	Slovenia	7.24	Q, SB
6	2	Kim Gevaert	Belgium	7.24	Q, =NR
7	1	Sandra Citte	France	7.25	Q
8	1	Marcia Richardson	Great Britain	7.26	Q
9	1	Saša Prokofijev	Slovenia	7.27	
9	1	Manuela Levorato	Italy	7.27	
9	2	Marina Kislova	Russia	7.27	
12	1	Marion Wagner	Germany	7.28	SB
13	2	Joice Maduaka	Great Britain	7.30	PB
14	1	Sanna Kyllönen	Finland	7.34	
15	2	Karin Mayr	Austria	7.35	
16	2	Andrea Philipp	Germany	7.40	

=== Final ===
Rank	Name	Nationality	Reaction	Time	Notes
1st place, gold medalist(s)	Ekaterini Thanou	Greece	0.178	7.05	SB
2nd place, silver medalist(s)	Petya Pendareva	Bulgaria	0.146	7.11	
3rd place, bronze medalist(s)	Iryna Pukha	Ukraine	0.132	7.11	PB
4	Anzhela Kravchenko	Ukraine	0.141	7.14	
5	Alenka Bikar	Slovenia	0.139	7.20	NR
6	Kim Gevaert	Belgium	0.141	7.22	NR
7	Sandra Citte	France	0.133	7.24	
8	Marcia Richardson	Great Britain	0.146	7.27	
