= 2001 IAAF World Indoor Championships – Women's 60 metres =

The women's 60 metres event at the 2001 IAAF World Indoor Championships was held on March 11.

== Medalists ==
Gold	Silver	Bronze
Chandra Sturrup; Bahamas	Angela Williams; United States	Chryste Gaines; United States

== Results ==
=== Heats ===
First 3 of each heat (Q) and next 7 fastest (q) qualified for the semifinals.

Rank	Heat	Name	Nationality	Time	Notes
1	2	Chandra Sturrup	Bahamas	7.14	Q, SB
2	1	Petya Pendareva	Bulgaria	7.15	Q
3	6	Mercy Nku	Nigeria	7.16	Q
4	5	Endurance Ojokolo	Nigeria	7.17	Q, SB
5	2	Chryste Gaines	United States	7.18	Q
5	4	Angela Williams	United States	7.18	Q
7	1	Sevatheda Fynes	Bahamas	7.22	Q
8	3	Marina Kislova	Russia	7.24	Q
9	5	Larisa Kruglova	Russia	7.27	Q
10	2	Karin Mayr	Austria	7.28	Q
10	2	Sandra Citte	France	7.28	q, SB
10	3	Saša Prokofijev	Slovenia	7.28	Q
13	4	Anzhela Kravchenko	Ukraine	7.29	Q
14	6	Severina Cravid	Portugal	7.30	Q, PB
15	3	Tanya Lawrence	Jamaica	7.31	Q
16	4	Li Xuemei	China	7.32	Q
16	6	Liliana Allen	Mexico	7.32	Q
18	5	Natalya Vinogradova-Safronnikova	Belarus	7.33	Q
19	6	Daniela Graglia	Italy	7.35	q, PB
20	4	Georgia Kokloni	Greece	7.37	Q
20	5	Paraskevi Patoulidou	Greece	7.37	q
22	1	Odiah Sidibé	France	7.38	Q
22	5	Katleen De Caluwé	Belgium	7.38	q
24	2	Lyubov Perepelova	Uzbekistan	7.40	q, PB
25	6	Iryna Pukha	Ukraine	7.40	
26	2	Aksel Gürcan	Turkey	7.43	
27	1	Heather Samuel	Antigua and Barbuda	7.44	
28	1	Enikő Szabó	Hungary	7.45	
29	4	Nancy Callaerts	Belgium	7.50	
30	5	Rahela Markt	Croatia	7.55	
31	3	Viktoriya Koviryeva	Kazakhstan	7.57	
32	1	Manuela Grillo	Italy	7.59	
32	2	Joanna Hauareau	Seychelles	7.59	
34	5	Guzel Chubbiyeva	Uzbekistan	7.61	
35	2	Elena Bobrovskaya	Kyrgyzstan	7.73	
36	6	Maitté Zamorano	Bolivia	7.87	NR
37	3	Gloria Gatti	San Marino	8.01	SB
38	4	Silvienne Krosendijk	Aruba	8.04	
39	1	Paulina Biang Eyegue	Equatorial Guinea	8.42	
	3	Nora Ivanova-Güner	Turkey	DNS	
	3	Susanthika Jayasinghe	Sri Lanka	DNS	
	4	Alenka Bikar	Slovenia	DNS	
	6	Vida Nsiah	Ghana	DNS	

=== Semifinals ===
First 2 of each semifinal (Q) and next 2 fastest (q) qualified for the final.

Rank	Heat	Name	Nationality	Time	Notes
1	1	Petya Pendareva	Bulgaria	7.04	Q, WL, PB
2	2	Angela Williams	United States	7.10	Q, PB
3	3	Chandra Sturrup	Bahamas	7.11	Q, SB
4	3	Chryste Gaines	United States	7.12	Q, PB
5	1	Endurance Ojokolo	Nigeria	7.13	Q, SB
6	2	Mercy Nku	Nigeria	7.15	Q
7	1	Savatheda Fynes	Bahamas	7.16	q, SB
8	1	Li Xuemei	China	7.19	q, NR
9	3	Marina Kislova	Russia	7.20	
10	2	Tanya Lawrence	Jamaica	7.21	PB
11	2	Liliana Allen	Mexico	7.24	
12	2	Anzhela Kravchenko	Ukraine	7.27	
13	1	Natalya Vinogradova-Safronnikova	Belarus	7.28	
14	1	Severina Cravid	Portugal	7.31	
15	2	Larisa Kruglova	Russia	7.33	
15	3	Karin Mayr	Austria	7.33	
17	1	Paraskevi Patoulidou	Greece	7.34	
17	3	Odiah Sidibé	France	7.34	
19	3	Saša Prokofijev	Slovenia	7.35	
20	2	Katleen De Caluwé	Belgium	7.39	
21	3	Daniela Graglia	Italy	7.42	
22	3	Lyubov Perepelova	Uzbekistan	7.43	
23	2	Georgia Kokloni	Greece	7.45	
	1	Sandra Citte	France	DQ	

=== Final ===
Rank	Name	Nationality	Time	Notes
1st place, gold medalist(s)	Chandra Sturrup	Bahamas	7.05	PB
2nd place, silver medalist(s)	Angela Williams	United States	7.09	PB
3rd place, bronze medalist(s)	Chryste Gaines	United States	7.12	=PB
4	Savatheda Fynes	Bahamas	7.15	SB
5	Mercy Nku	Nigeria	7.15	
6	Petya Pendareva	Bulgaria	7.16	
7	Li Xuemei	China	7.20	
8	Endurance Ojokolo	Nigeria	7.23	
