= 1997 World Championships in Athletics – Women's 100 metres =

These are the results of the women's 100 metres event at the 1997 World Championships in Athletics in Athens, Greece.

== Medalists ==
Gold	Marion Jones; United States (USA)
Silver	Zhanna Pintusevich; Ukraine (UKR)
Bronze	(The Bahamas) Savatheda Fynes; Bahamas (BAH)

== Records ==
World Record	Florence Griffith-Joyner (USA)	10.49	Indianapolis, United States	16 July 1988
Championship Record	Gail Devers (USA)	10.82	Stuttgart, Germany	16 August 1993
Championship Record	Merlene Ottey (JAM)	10.82	Stuttgart, Germany	16 August 1993

== Results ==
=== First round ===
2 August

Heat	Rank	Name	Result	Notes
4	1	Zhanna Pintusevich (UKR)	11.01 Q	SB
8	2	Inger Miller (USA)	11.07 Q	
7	3	Marion Jones (USA)	11.09 Q	
1	4	Christine Arron (FRA)	11.13 Q	
5	5	Savatheda Fynes (BAH)	11.18 Q	
6	6	Li Xuemei (CHN)	11.21 Q	
3	7	Merlene Ottey (JAM)	11.27 Q	
5	8	Chioma Ajunwa (NGR)	11.28 Q	
6	8	Petya Pendareva (BUL)	11.28 Q	SB
7	10	Beverly McDonald (JAM)	11.29 Q	
4	11	Lucrecia Jardim (POR)	11.30 Q	NR
4	11	Chryste Gaines (USA)	11.30 Q	
1	13	Natalya Pomoshchnikova-Voronova (RUS)	11.31 Q	
3	13	Melanie Paschke (GER)	11.31 Q	
2	15	Katerina Thanou (GRE)	11.32 Q	
2	16	Andrea Philipp (GER)	11.33 Q	
5	16	Hanitriniaina Rakotondrabe (MAD)	11.33 Q	
6	18	Frederique Bangue (FRA)	11.34 Q	
1	19	Liu Xiaomei (CHN)	11.35 Q	
3	20	Eldece Clarke (BAH)	11.36 Q	
6	20	Melinda Gainsford (AUS)	11.36 q	
4	22	Lucimar de Moura (BRA)	11.37 q	
7	23	Nora Ivanova (BUL)	11.42 Q	
8	24	Esther Moller (GER)	11.44 Q	
7	25	Anzhela Kravchenko (UKR)	11.46 q	
1	25	Heather Samuel (ATG)	11.46 q	
2	27	Debbie Ferguson (BAH)	11.47 Q	
4	28	Maria Tsoni (GRE)	11.48 q	
8	29	Endurance Ojokolu (NGR)	11.53 Q	
2	30	Sanna Hernesniemi (FIN)	11.54 q	
5	30	Lauren Hewitt (AUS)	11.54 q	
8	30	Pei Fang (CHN)	11.54 q	
8	33	Delphine Combe (FRA)	11.55	
3	34	Manuela Levorato (ITA)	11.57	
7	35	Simmone Jacobs (GBR)	11.58	
3	36	Johanna Manninen (FIN)	11.59	
5	37	Aida Diop (SEN)	11.61	
7	38	Leonie Mani (CMR)	11.62	
5	39	Giada Gallina (ITA)	11.64	
4	40	Marcia Richardson (GBR)	11.65	
6	41	Natalya Ignatova (RUS)	11.70	
4	42	Deirdre Caruana (MLT)	12.73	
1	43	Irina Pukha (UKR)	11.75	
8	44	Aksel Gürcan (TUR)	11.82	
2	45	Sandra Borrero (COL)	11.83	
2	46	Cydonie Mothersille (CAY)	11.87	
1	47	Tamara Shanidze (GEO)	11.97	
1	48	Antonia Cadore (GRN)	12.00	NR
3	49	Elma Posadas (PHI)	12.19	
3	50	Laure Kuetey (BEN)	12.38	
2	51	N. Rabbaiya (INA)	12.43	
8	52	Devi Maya Paneru (NEP)	12.97	
5	53	Shyrome Hughes (ANG)	13.03	
4	54	Edouwe Appin (NRU)	14.19	
6	55	Tiresa Paselio (SAM)	14.36	
2	56	Peoria Koshiba (PLW)	14.55	
6	—	Hermin Joseph (DMA)	DNS	
7	—	Mayra Mayberry (PUR)	DNS	
7	—	Marwa Rostom (PLE)	DNS	

=== Second round ===
2 August

Heat	Rank	Name	Result	Notes
1	1	Zhanna Pintusevich (UKR)	10.90 Q	NR
3	2	Marion Jones (USA)	10.96 Q	
2	3	Merlene Ottey (JAM)	11.00 Q	
4	4	Christine Arron (FRA)	11.04 Q	
1	5	Chioma Ajunwa (NGR)	11.14 Q	SB
4	6	Sevatheda Fynes (BAH)	11.16 Q	
4	7	Natalya Pomoshchnikova-Voronova (RUS)	11.17 Q	SB
1	8	Ekaterini Thanou (GRE)	11.19 Q	
1	9	Chryste Gaines (USA)	11.19 q	
1	10	Melinda Gainsford-Taylor (AUS)	11.20 q	
2	11	Inger Miller (USA)	11.23 Q	
3	11	Melanie Paschke (GER)	11.23 Q	
2	13	Andrea Philipp (GER)	11.26 Q	
3	14	Eldece Clarke-Lewis (BAH)	11.27 Q	
2	15	Debbie Ferguson (BAH)	11.28 q	SB
3	16	Frederique Bangue (FRA)	11.31 q	
3	17	Beverly McDonald (JAM)	11.31 q	
3	18	Li Xuemei (CHN)	11.36	
4	18	Nora Ivanova (BUL)	11.36	
4	20	Liu Xiaomei (CHN)	11.37	
1	21	Sanna Hernesniemi-Kyllonen (FIN)	11.37	
2	22	Petya Pendareva (BUL)	11.39	
4	23	Lucrecia Jardim (POR)	11.40	
1	24	Esther Moller (GER)	11.42	
4	25	Anzhela Kravchenko (UKR)	11.43	
2	26	Lucimar de Moura (BRA)	11.44	
2	27	Hanitriniaina Rakotondrabe (MAD)	11.49	
1	28	Pei Fang (CHN)	11.50	
3	29	Endurance Ojokolo (NGR)	11.53	
2	30	Lauren Hewitt (AUS)	11.55	
3	31	Heather Samuel (ATG)	11.56	
4	32	Maria Tsoni (GRE)	11.62	

=== Semifinals ===
3 August

Heat	Rank	Name	Result	Notes
2	1	Marion Jones (USA)	10.94 Q	
2	2	Merlene Ottey (JAM)	11.08 Q	
1	3	Zhanna Pintusevich (UKR)	11.10 Q	
2	4	Savatheda Fynes (BAH)	11.11 Q	
1	5	Christine Arron (FRA)	11.13 Q	
2	6	Inger Miller (USA)	11.17 Q	
1	7	Melanie Paschke (GER)	11.34 Q	
2	7	Katerina Thanou (GRE)	11.34	
1	9	Chryste Gaines (USA)	11.35 Q	
2	9	Melinda Gainsford (AUS)	11.35	
1	9	Natalya Pomoshchnikova-Voronova (RUS)	11.35	
2	12	Debbie Ferguson (BAH)	11.39	
2	13	Andrea Philipp (GER)	11.40	
1	14	Eldece Clarke-Lewis (BAH)	11.41	
1	14	Chioma Ajunwa (NGR)	11.41	
1	16	Frederique Bangue (FRA)	11.44	

=== Final ===
3 August

Rank	Lane	Name	Result	Notes
Gold medal	3	Marion Jones (USA)	10.83	WL
Silver medal	5	Zhanna Pintusevich (UKR)	10.85	NR
Bronze medal	1	Savatheda Fynes (BAH)	11.03	PB
4	4	Christine Arron (FRA)	11.05	
5	7	Inger Miller (USA)	11.18	
6	2	Melanie Paschke (GER)	11.19	
7	6	Merlene Ottey (JAM)	11.29	
8	8	Chryste Gaines (USA)	11.32	
