= Athletics at the 2000 Summer Olympics – Women's 4 × 100 metres relay =

Women's 4×100 metres relay at the Games of the XXVII Olympiad
- Venue: Stadium Australia
- Winning time: 41.95

Medalists
1st place, gold medalist(s)		Bahamas; Savatheda Fynes; Chandra Sturrup; Pauline Davis-Thompson; Debbie Ferguson; Eldece Clarke-Lewis*
2nd place, silver medalist(s)		Jamaica; Tayna Lawrence; Veronica Campbell; Beverly McDonald; Merlene Ottey; Merlene Frazer*
3rd place, bronze medalist(s)		United States; Chryste Gaines; Torri Edwards; Nanceen Perry; ~~Marion Jones~~; Passion Richardson* *Indicates the athlete only competed in the preliminary heats.

The women's 4 × 100 metres relay races at the 2000 Summer Olympics as part of the athletics program were held on Friday, 29 September and Saturday, 30 September.

== Records ==
These were the standing world and Olympic records (in minutes:seconds) prior to the 2000 Summer Olympics.

World record	41.37 s	East Germany	Silke Gladisch-Möller; Ingrid Auerswald; Marlies Göhr; Sabine Rieger	Canberra (Australia)	6 October 1985
Olympic record	41.60 s	East Germany	Romy Müller; Bärbel Wöckel; Ingrid Auerswald; Marlies Göhr	Moscow (USSR)	1 August 1980

== Medals ==
On 23 November 2007, the IAAF recommended to the IOC Executive Board to disqualify the USA women's 4 × 100 m and 4 × 400 m relay teams after Marion Jones admitted to having taken performance-enhancing drugs prior to the Games. On 12 December, the IOC disqualified Jones and stripped her of her relay medals but it did not disqualify the U.S. relay teams. On 10 April 2008, the IOC disqualified both U.S. relay teams and asked for Jones' teammates' medals to be returned. France (Linda Ferga, Muriel Hurtis, Fabe Dia, Christine Arron, Sandra Citte*) finished fourth in the 4 × 100 m relay in a time of 42.42, and Nigeria (Olabisi Afolabi, Opara Charity, Rosemary Okafor, Falilat Ogunkoya-Osheku, Doris Jacob*) finished fourth in the 4 × 400 m relay in a time of 3:23.80. All members of the U.S. relay teams except Nanceen Perry then appealed to the Court of Arbitration for Sport who on 16 July 2010 ruled in favor of them due to the fact that, according to the rules at the time, a team should not be disqualified because of a doping offense of one athlete. Their medals were then restored to them.

* Athletes who participated in the heats only, and also received medals.

== Golden Girls ==
The Bahamas celebrated their winning team, the "Golden Girls", with a mural at the Nassau airport.

== Results ==
=== Abbreviations ===
All times shown are in seconds.

- Q denotes automatic qualification.
- q denotes fastest losers.
- DNS denotes did not start.
- DNF denotes did not finish.
- AR denotes area record.
- NR denotes national record.
- SB denotes season's best.

=== Heats ===
==== Heat 1 ====
First 3 in each heat (Q) and four fastest losers (q) advance to the semi-finals.

Heat 1 of 4 Date: Friday 29 September 2000
Place		Nation	Athletes	Lane	Time	Qual.	Record
Heat	Overall	Nation	Athletes	Lane	Time	Qual.	Record
1	7	France	Sandra Citte, Fabe Dia, Muriel Hurtis, Christine Arron	3	43.23	Q	
2	10	Greece	Paraskevi Patoulidou, Effrosíni Patsoú, Ekateríni Kóffa, Ekateríni Thánou	6	43.46	Q	SB
3	15	Poland	Marzena Pawlak, Joanna Niełacna, Agnieszka Rysiukiewicz, Zuzanna Radecka	7	44.05	Q	
4	19	Thailand	Wirawan Ruamsuk, Supavadee Khawpeag, Orranut Klomdee, Trecia Roberts	2	44.51		SB
5	21	FR Yugoslavia	Elvira Pančić, Mila Savić, Biljana Mitrović, Vukosava Đapić	4	45.02		
6		Australia	Elly Hutton, Lauren Hewitt, Sharon Cripps, Melinda Gainsford-Taylor	4	DNF		

==== Heat 2 ====
Heat 2 of 4 Date: Friday 29 September 2000
Place		Nation	Athletes	Lane	Time	Qual.	Record
Heat	Overall	Nation	Athletes	Lane	Time	Qual.	Record
1	1	Jamaica	Tayna Lawrence, Veronica Campbell, Beverly McDonald, Merlene Frazer	4	42.46	Q	SB
2	3	Germany	Gabriele Rockmeier, Sabrina Mulrain, Andrea Philipp, Marion Wagner	5	42.82	Q	
3	5	China	Zeng Xiujun, Liu Xiaomei, Qin Wangping, Li Xuemei	2	43.07	Q	SB
4	8	Great Britain	Joice Maduaka, Marcia Richardson, Sarah Wilhelmy, Shani Anderson	3	43.26	q	SB
5	16	Colombia	Digna Luz Murillo, Ximena Restrepo, Mirtha Brock, Felipa Palacios	7	44.08	q	SB
6	16	Canada	Atia Weekes, Esi Benyarku, Tamara Perry, Martha Adusei	6	44.08		

==== Heat 3 ====
Heat 3 of 4 Date: Friday 29 September 2000
Place		Nation	Athletes	Lane	Time	Qual.	Record
Heat	Overall	Nation	Athletes	Lane	Time	Qual.	Record
1	2	Bahamas	Eldece Clarke-Lewis, Chandra Sturrup, Pauline Davis-Thompson, Sevatheda Fynes	3	42.58	Q	
2	12	Finland	Manuela Bosco, Sanna Hernesniemi-Kyllönen, Johanna Manninen, Heidi Hannula	5	43.66	Q	SB
3	13	Ghana	Mavis Akoto, Monica Twum, Veronica Bawuah, Vida Nsiah	7	43.77	Q	NR
4	14	Ukraine	Irina Pukha, Anzhela Kravchenko, Olena Pastushenko, Yelena Ovcharova-Krasovska	4	43.93	q	
5	18	Ivory Coast	Amandine Allou Affoué, Makaridja Sanganoko, Marie Gnahoré, Louise Ayétotché	6	44.34		NR
6	23	India	Valdivel Jayalakshmi, Vinita Tripathi, Saraswati Dey, Rachita Mistry	2	45.20		

==== Heat 4 ====
Heat 4 of 4 Date: Friday 29 September 2000
Place		Nation	Athletes	Lane	Time	Qual.	Record
Heat	Overall	Nation	Athletes	Lane	Time	Qual.	Record
1	4	United States	Chryste Gaines, Torri Edwards, Nanceen Perry, Passion Richardson	6	42.92	Q	
2	6	Russia	Natalya Ignatova, Marina Trandenkova, Marina Kislova, Natalya Pomoshchnikova-Voronova	3	43.15	Q	SB
3	9	Nigeria	Glory Alozie, Benedicta Ajudua, Mercy Nku, Mary Onyali	8	43.28	Q	
4	11	Madagascar	Monica Rahanitraniriana, Ony Paule Ratsimbazafy, Rosa Rakotozafy, Hanitrinianina Rakotondrabe	5	43.61	q	NR
5	19	Sri Lanka	Tamara Samandeepika, Pradeepa Herath, Nimmi de Zoysa, K. V. Damayanthi Dharsha	4	44.51		
6	22	Uzbekistan	Yelena Kvyatkovskaya, Lyubov Perepelova, Lyudmila Dmitriadi, Guzel Khubbieva	2	45.14		SB
7	24	Cameroon	Esther Mvondo, Anne-Marie Mouri-Nkeng, Carine Eyenga, Françoise Mbango Etone	7	45.82		SB

==== Round 1- Overall ====
Round 1 Overall Results
Place	Nation	Athletes	Heat	Lane	Place	Time	Qual.	Record
1	Jamaica	Tayna Lawrence, Veronica Campbell, Beverly McDonald, Merlene Frazer	2	4	1	42.46	Q	SB
2	Bahamas	Eldece Clarke-Lewis, Chandra Sturrup, Pauline Davis-Thompson, Sevatheda Fynes	3	3	1	42.58	Q	
3	Germany	Gabriele Rockmeier, Sabrina Mulrain, Andrea Philipp, Marion Wagner	2	5	2	42.82	Q	
4	United States	Chryste Gaines, Torri Edwards, Nanceen Perry, Passion Richardson	4	6	1	42.92	Q	
5	China	Zeng Xiujun, Liu Xiaomei, Qin Wangping, Li Xuemei	2	5	3	43.07	Q	SB
6	Russia	Natalya Ignatova, Marina Trandenkova, Marina Kislova, Natalya Pomoshchnikova-Voronova	4	3	2	43.15	Q	SB
7	France	Sandra Citte, Fabe Dia, Muriel Hurtis, Christine Aaron	1	2	3	43.23	Q	
8	Great Britain	Joice Maduaka, Marcia Richardson, Sarah Wilhelmy, Shani Anderson	2	3	4	43.26	q	SB
9	Nigeria	Glory Alozie, Benedicta Ajudua, Mercy Nku, Mary Onyali	4	8	3	43.28	Q	
10	Greece	Paraskevi Patoulidou, Effrosíni Patsoú, Ekateríni Kóffa, Ekateríni Thánou	1	2	6	43.46	Q	SB
11	Madagascar	Monica Rahanitraniriana, Ony Paule Ratsimbazafy, Rosa Rakotozafy, Hanitrinianina Rakotondrabe	4	5	2	43.61	q	NR
12	Finland	Manuela Bosco, Sanna Hernesniemi-Kyllönen, Johanna Manninen, Heidi Hannula	3	5	2	43.66	Q	SB
13	Ghana	Mavis Akoto, Monica Twum, Veronica Bawuah, Vida Nsiah	3	7	3	43.77	Q	NR
14	Ukraine	Irina Pukha, Anzhela Kravchenko, Olena Pastushenko, Yelena Ovcharova-Krasovska	3	4	4	43.93	q	
15	Poland	Marzena Pawlak, Joanna Niełacna, Agnieszka Rysiukiewicz, Zuzanna Radecka	1	7	3	44.05	Q	
16	Colombia	Digna Luz Murillo, Ximena Restrepo, Mirtha Brock, Felipa Palacios	2	7	5	44.08	q	SB
16	Canada	Atia Weekes, Esi Benyarku, Tamara Perry, Martha Adusei	2	6	6	44.08		
18	Ivory Coast	Amandine Allou Affoué, Makaridja Sanganoko, Mary Gnahore, Louise Ayétotché	3	6	5	44.34		NR
19	Sri Lanka	Tamara Saman Deepika, Pradeepa Herath, S. Nimi De Zoya, K. V. Damayanthi Dharsha	4	4	5	44.51		
19	Thailand	Wirawan Ruamsuk, Supavadee Khawpeag, Orranut Klomdee, Trecia Roberts	1	2	4	44.51		SB
21	FR Yugoslavia	Elvira Pancic, Mila Savic, Biljana Mitrovic, Vukosava Djapic	1	5	5	45.02		
22	Uzbekistan	Elena Kviatkovskaya, Lyubov Perepelova, Lyudmila Dmitriadi, Guzel Khubbieva	4	2	6	45.14		SB
23	India	Valdivel Jayalakshmi, Vinta Tripathi, Saraswati Dey, Rachita Mistry	3	2	6	45.20		
24	Cameroon	Esther Mvondo, Anne Marie Mouri Nkeng, Carine Eyenga, Françoise Mbango Etone	4	7	4	45.82		SB
	Australia	Elly Hutton, Lauren Hewitt, Sharon Cripps, Melinda Gainsford-Taylor	1	4		DNF		

=== Semi-finals ===
First three in each heat (Q) and two fastest losers (q) advance to the final.

==== Heat 1 ====
Heat 1 of 2 Date: Friday 29 September 2000
Place		Nation	Athletes	Lane	Time	Qual.	Record
Heat	Overall	Nation	Athletes	Lane	Time	Qual.	Record
1	2	Bahamas	Eldece Clarke-Lewis, Chandra Sturrup, Pauline Davis-Thompson, Sevatheda Fynes	6	42.42	Q	
2	4	United States	Chryste Gaines, Torri Edwards, Nanceen Perry, Passion Richardson	3	42.82	Q	
3	4	Nigeria	Glory Alozie, Benedicta Ajudua, Mercy Nku, Mary Onyali	7	42.82	Q	SB
4	6	Russia	Natalya Ignatova, Marina Trandenkova, Irina Khabarova, Natalya Pomoshchnikova-Voronova	4	42.84	q	SB
5	9	Ghana	Mavis Akoto, Monica Twum, Vida Anim, Vida Nsiah	2	43.19		NR
6	11	Ukraine	Irina Pukha, Anzhela Kravchenko, Olena Pastushenko, Yelena Ovcharova-Krasovska	8	43.31		
7	13	Greece	Paraskevi Patoulidou, Effrosíni Patsoú, Ekateríni Kóffa, Ekateríni Thánou	5	43.53		
8	14	Madagascar	Monica Rahanitraniriana, Ony Paule Ratsimbazafy, Rosa Rakotozafy, Hanitrinianina Rakotondrabe	1	43.98		

==== Heat 2 ====
Heat 2 of 2 Date: Friday 29 September 2000
Place		Nation	Athletes	Lane	Time	Qual.	Record
Heat	Overall	Nation	Athletes	Lane	Time	Qual.	Record
1	1	Jamaica	Tayna Lawrence, Veronica Campbell, Beverly McDonald, Merlene Frazer	3	42.15	Q	SB
2	2	France	Sandra Citte, Muriel Hurtis, Fabe Dia, Christine Arron	4	42.42	Q	
3	7	Germany	Gabriele Rockmeier, Sabrina Mulrain, Andrea Philipp, Marion Wagner	5	42.85	Q	
4	8	China	Zeng Xiujun, Liu Xiaomei, Qin Wangping, Li Xuemei	7	43.04	q	SB
5	9	Great Britain	Joice Maduaka, Marcia Richardson, Samantha Davies, Shani Anderson	8	43.19		SB
6	12	Finland	Manuela Bosco, Sanna Hernesniemi-Kyllönen, Johanna Manninen, Heidi Hannula	6	43.50		SB
7	15	Poland	Marzena Pawlak, Joanna Niełacna, Agnieszka Rysiukiewicz, Zuzanna Radecka	2	44.07		
8	16	Colombia	Melisa Murillo, Ximena Restrepo, Mirtha Brock, Felipa Palacios	1	44.37		

==== Semi-Finals- Overall ====
Semi-Finals Overall Results
Place	Nation	Athletes	Heat	Lane	Place	Time	Qual.	Record
1	Jamaica	Tayna Lawrence, Veronica Campbell, Beverly McDonald, Merlene Frazer	2	3	1	42.15	Q	SB
2	France	Sandra Citte, Muriel Hurtis, Fabe Dia, Christine Arron	2	4	2	42.42	Q	
2	Bahamas	Eldece Clarke-Lewis, Chandra Sturrup, Pauline Davis-Thompson, Sevatheda Fynes	1	6	1	42.42	Q	
4	United States	Chryste Gaines, Torri Edwards, Nanceen Perry, Passion Richardson	1	3	2	42.82	Q	
4	Nigeria	Glory Alozie, Benedicta Ajudua, Mercy Nku, Mary Onyali	1	7	3	42.82	Q	SB
6	Russia	Natalya Ignatova, Marina Trandenkova, Irina Khabarova, Natalya Pomoshchnikova-Voronova	1	4	4	42.84	q	SB
7	Germany	Gabriele Rockmeier, Sabrina Mulrain, Andrea Philipp, Marion Wagner	2	5	3	42.85	Q	
8	China	Zeng Xiujun, Liu Xiaomei, Qin Wangping, Li Xuemei	2	7	4	43.04	q	SB
9	Great Britain	Joice Maduaka, Marcia Richardson, Samantha Davies, Shani Anderson	2	8	5	43.19		SB
9	Ghana	Mavis Akoto, Monica Twum, Vida Anim, Vida Nsiah	1	2	5	43.19		NR
11	Ukraine	Irina Pukha, Anzhela Kravchenko, Olena Pastushenko, Yelena Ovcharova-Krasovska	1	8	6	43.31		
12	Finland	Manuela Bosco, Sanna Hernesniemi-Kyllönen, Johanna Manninen, Heidi Hannula	2	6	6	43.50		SB
13	Greece	Paraskevi Patoulidou, Effrosíni Patsoú, Ekateríni Kóffa, Ekateríni Thánou	1	5	7	43.53		
14	Madagascar	Monica Rahanitraniriana, Ony Paule Ratsimbazafy, Rosa Rakotozafy, Hanitrinianina Rakotondrabe	1	1	8	43.98		
15	Poland	Marzena Pawlak, Joanna Niełacna, Agnieszka Rysiukiewicz, Zuzanna Radecka	2	2	7	44.07		
16	Colombia	Melisa Murillo, Ximena Restrepo, Mirtha Brock, Felipa Palacios	2	1	8	44.37		

=== Final ===
- 30 September 2000

Final
Place	Nation	Athletes	Lane	Reaction	Time	Record
1st place, gold medalist(s)	Bahamas	Sevatheda Fynes, Chandra Sturrup, Pauline Davis-Thompson, Debbie Ferguson	5	0.153 s	41.95	SB
2nd place, silver medalist(s)	Jamaica	Tayna Lawrence, Veronica Campbell, Beverly McDonald, Merlene Ottey	3	0.174 s	42.13	SB
3rd place, bronze medalist(s)	United States	Chryste Gaines, Torri Edwards, Nanceen Perry, ~~Marion Jones~~	6	0.384 s	42.20	
4	France	Linda Ferga, Muriel Hurtis, Fabe Dia, Christine Arron	4	0.433 s	42.42	
5	Russia	Natalya Ignatova, Marina Trandenkova, Irina Khabarova, Natalya Pomoshchnikova-Voronova	8	0.153 s	43.02	
6	Germany	Gabriele Rockmeier, Sabrina Mulrain, Andrea Philipp, Marion Wagner	1	0.155 s	43.11	
7	Nigeria	Glory Alozie, Benedicta Ajudua, Mercy Nku, Mary Onyali	7	0.415 s	44.05	
8	China	Zeng Xiujun, Liu Xiaomei, Qin Wangping, Li Xuemei	2	0.212 s	44.87	
