= 1999 World Championships in Athletics – Women's 4 × 100 metres relay =

The Women's 4 × 100 metres relay event at the 1999 World Championships in Athletics was held at the Estadio Olímpico de Sevilla on August 28 and August 29.

== Medals ==
| Gold: | Silver: | Bronze: |
|---|---|---|
| Bahamas; Savatheda Fynes; Chandra Sturrup; Pauline Davis-Thompson; Debbie Ferguson | France; Patricia Girard; Muriel Hurtis; Katia Benth; Christine Arron | Jamaica; Aleen Bailey; Merlene Frazer; Beverly McDonald; Peta-Gaye Dowdie |

== Results ==
=== Heats ===
All times shown are in seconds.

AR area record | CR championship record | GR games record | NR national record | OR Olympic record | PB personal best | SB season best | WL world leading (in a given season)
DNS = did not start | DQ = disqualification | NM = no mark (i.e. no valid result) | Q = qualification by place in heat | q = qualification by overall place

==== Heat 1 ====
1. United States (Cheryl Taplin, Nanceen Perry, Inger Miller, Gail Devers) 42.28 Q (WL)
2. Jamaica (Aleen Bailey, Merlene Frazer, Beverly McDonald, Peta-Gaye Dowdie) 42.36 Q (SB)
3. Great Britain (Marcia Richardson, Shani Anderson, Christine Bloomfield, Joice Maduaka) 43.31 q (SB)
4. Finland (Petra Söderström, Sanna Hernesniemi-Kyllönen, Johanna Manninen, Heidi Hannula) 43.86 (SB)
5. South Africa (Charlene Lawrence, Heide Seyerling, Leanie Van Der Walt, Wendy Hartman) 44.35 (SB)
6. Greece (Paraskevi Patoulidou, Ekaterini Koffa, Marina Vasarmidou, Ekaterini Thanou) 44.68
7. Cameroon (Esther Mvondo, Myriam Léonie Mani, Anne Marie Mouri-Nkeng, Fouda Edwige Abena) 45.37

==== Heat 2 ====
1. Bahamas (Eldece Clarke-Lewis, Chandra Sturrup, Pauline Davis-Thompson, Savatheda Fynes) 42.40 Q (SB)
2. Germany (Andrea Philipp, Gabi Rockmeier, Esther Möller, Marion Wagner) 42.74 Q (SB)
3. Canada (Angela Bailey, Philomena Mensah, Tara Perry, Martha Adusei) 43.27 q (SB)
4. Spain (Carmen Blay, Julia Alba, Arantxa Iglesias, Cristina Sanz) 45.14
  - Puerto Rico (Heysha Ortiz, Jennifer Caraballo, Zuleika Almodovar, Jessenia Rivera) DQ
  - Russia (Natalya Ignatova, Oksana Ekk, Irina Khabarova, Marina Trandenkova)

==== Heat 3 ====
1. France (Katia Benth, Muriel Hurtis, Fabe Dia, Christine Arron) 42.30 Q (SB)
2. Poland (Marzena Pawlak, Joanna Balcerczak, Monika Borejza, Zuzanna Radecka) 43.73 Q
3. Ukraine (Iryna Pukha, Anzhela Kravchenko, Oksana Kaydash, Anzhelika Shevchuk) 43.80
4. Madagascar (Lantoniana Ramalalanirina, Ony Paule Ratsimbazafy, Rosa Rakotozafy, Hanitriniaina Rakotondrabe) 44.36 (SB)
5. Japan (Toshie Iwamoto, Motoka Arai, Kaori Sakagami, Yvonne Kanazawa) 44.80
  - Nigeria (Glory Alozie, Joan Uduak Ekah, Mercy Nku, Endurance Ojokolo) DQ

=== Final ===
1. Bahamas (Savatheda Fynes, Chandra Sturrup, Pauline Davis-Thompson, Debbie Ferguson) 41.92 (WL)
2. France (Patricia Girard, Muriel Hurtis, Katia Benth, Christine Arron) 42.06 (NR)
3. Jamaica (Aleen Bailey, Merlene Frazer, Beverly McDonald, Peta-Gaye Dowdie) 42.15 (SB)
4. United States (Cheryl Taplin, Nanceen Perry, Inger Miller, Gail Devers) 42.30
5. Germany (Andrea Philipp, Gabi Rockmeier, Esther Möller, Marion Wagner) 42.63 (SB)
6. Canada (Angela Bailey, Philomena Mensah, Tara Perry, Martha Adusei) 43.39
7. Poland (Zuzanna Radecka, Irena Sznajder, Monika Borejza, Joanna Balcerczak) 43.51
8. Great Britain (Marcia Richardson, Shani Anderson, Christine Bloomfield, Joice Maduaka) 43.52
