= 2001 World Championships in Athletics – Women's 4 × 100 metres relay =

These are the official results of the Women's 4 × 100 metres event at the 2001 IAAF World Championships in Edmonton, Alberta, Canada.

== Medalists ==
Gold	Silver	Bronze
Germany; Melanie Paschke; Gabi Rockmeier; Birgit Rockmeier; Marion Wagner	France; Sylviane Félix; Frederique Bangue; Muriel Hurtis; Odiah Sidibe	Jamaica; Juliet Campbell; Merlene Frazer; Beverly McDonald; Astia Walker; Elva Goulbourne*

* Runners who participated in the heats only and received medals.

== Results ==
=== Heats ===
The first 3 of each heat (Q) plus the 2 fastest times (q) qualify.

Rank	Heat	Nation	Athletes	Time	Notes
1	2	France	Sylviane Félix, Frederique Bangue, Muriel Hurtis, Odiah Sidibe	42.49	Q, WL
2	1	Germany	Melanie Paschke, Gabi Rockmeier, Birgit Rockmeier, Marion Wagner	42.92	Q, WL
3	1	Nigeria	Chioma Ajunwa, Endurance Ojokolo, Mercy Nku, Mary Onyali-Omagbemi	43.04	Q
4	2	Great Britain	Marcia Richardson, Sarah Wilhelmy, Vernicha James, Abiodun Oyepitan	43.08	Q, SB
5	1	Jamaica	Astia Walker, Merlene Frazer, Beverly McDonald, Elva Goulbourne	43.09	Q, SB
6	2	Russia	Natalya Ignatova, Irina Khabarova, Marina Kislova, Larisa Kruglova	43.09	q
7	1	Greece	Yeoryia Kokloni, Effrosini Patsou, Olga Kaidantzi, Ekaterini Thanou	43.58	
8	1	Sri Lanka	Susanthika Jayasinghe, Anoma Sooriyaarachchi, S. Nimi De Zoya, K.V.Damayanthi Dharsha	43.89	NR
9	1	Ivory Coast	Marie Gnahore, Makaridja Sanganoko, Amandine Allou Affoue, Louise Ayetotche	44.05	
10	1	Canada	Tara Perry, Erica Witter, Esi Benyarku, Martha Adusei	44.11	
11	2	Belgium	Nancy Callaerts, Katleen DeCaluwe, Elodie Ouedraogo, Kim Gevaert	44.19	NR
12	2	Uzbekistan	Anna Kazakova, Guzel Khubbieva, Lyudmila Dmitriadi, Lyubov Perepelova	45.99	
	2	United States	Angela Williams, Chryste Gaines, Inger Miller, Torri Edwards	DQ	

=== Final ===
Rank	Lane	Nation	Athletes	Time	Notes
1st place, gold medalist(s)	4	Germany	Melanie Paschke, Gabi Rockmeier, Birgit Rockmeier, Marion Wagner	42.32	SB
2nd place, silver medalist(s)	3	France	Sylviane Félix, Frederique Bangue, Muriel Hurtis, Odiah Sidibe	42.39	SB
3rd place, bronze medalist(s)	7	Jamaica	Juliet Campbell, Merlene Frazer, Beverly McDonald, Astia Walker	42.40	SB
4	5	Nigeria	Chioma Ajunwa, Endurance Ojokolo, Mercy Nku, Mary Onyali-Omagbemi	42.52	
5	2	Great Britain	Marcia Richardson, Sarah Wilhelmy, Vernicha James, Abiodun Oyepitan	42.60	SB
6	8	Greece	Yeoryia Kokloni, Effrosini Patsou, Olga Kaidantzi, Ekaterini Thanou	43.25	SB
7	1	Russia	Natalya Ignatova, Irina Khabarova, Marina Kislova, Larisa Kruglova	43.58	
	6	United States	Kelli White, Chryste Gaines, Inger Miller, Marion Jones	DQ	
