= Athletics at the 1998 Asian Games – Women's 4 × 100 metres relay =

Women's 4 × 100 metres relay at the 1998 Asian Games
- Venue: Thammasat Stadium
- Dates: 15 December 1998
- Competitors: 24 from 6 nations

Medalists
gold medal	China; Liang Yi, Yan Jiankui, Li Xuemei, Li Yali
silver medal	Uzbekistan; Guzel Khubbieva, Lyubov Perepelova, Lyudmila Dmitriadi, Elena Kviatkovskaya
bronze medal	Thailand; Supavadee Khawpeag, Natthaporn Wongtiprat, Savitree Srichure, Reawadee Watanasin

The women's 4 × 100 metres relay competition at the 1998 Asian Games in Bangkok, Thailand was held on 15 December at the Thammasat Stadium.

== Schedule ==
All times are Indochina Time (UTC+07:00)

Date	Time	Event
Thursday, 15 December 1998	16:50	Final

== Results ==
Rank	Team	Time	Notes
1st place, gold medalist(s)	China (CHN); Liang Yi; Yan Jiankui; Li Xuemei; Li Yali	43.36	GR
2nd place, silver medalist(s)	Uzbekistan (UZB); Guzel Khubbieva; Lyubov Perepelova; Lyudmila Dmitriadi; Elena Kviatkovskaya	44.38	
3rd place, bronze medalist(s)	Thailand (THA); Supavadee Khawpeag; Natthaporn Wongtiprat; Savitree Srichure; Reawadee Watanasin	44.68	
4	India (IND); Valdivel Jayalakshmi; P. T. Usha; E. B. Shyla; Rachita Mistry	44.77	
5	Japan (JPN); Tomomi Kaneko; Toshie Iwamoto; Motoka Arai; Tomoko Ishida	44.80	
6	Sri Lanka (SRI); Damayanthi Dharsha; Pradeepa Herath; Sriyani Kulawansa; Nimmi de Zoysa	44.94	
