= 2002 European Athletics Championships – Women's 4 × 100 metres relay =

Women's 4 × 100 metres relay at the European Athletics Championships

The women's 4 × 100 metres relay at the 2002 European Athletics Championships were held at the Olympic Stadium on August 10–11.

== Medalists ==
Gold	Silver	Bronze
France; Delphine Combe; Muriel Hurtis; Sylviane Félix; Odiah Sidibé	Germany; Melanie Paschke; Gabi Rockmeier; Sina Schielke; Marion Wagner	Russia; Natalya Ignatova; Yuliya Tabakova; Irina Khabarova; Larisa Kruglova

== Results ==
=== Heats ===
Qualification: First 3 of each heat (Q) and the next 2 fastest (q) qualified for the final.

Rank	Heat	Nation	Athlete	Time	Notes
1	1	Germany	Melanie Paschke, Gabi Rockmeier, Sina Schielke, Marion Wagner	43.05	Q
2	2	France	Delphine Combe, Muriel Hurtis, Sylviane Félix, Odiah Sidibé	43.52	Q
3	2	Ukraine	Iryna Kozhemyakina, Anzhela Kravchenko, Olena Pastushenko, Tetyana Tkalich	43.55	Q
4	1	Russia	Natalya Ignatova, Yuliya Tabakova, Irina Khabarova, Larisa Kruglova	43.57	Q
4	2	Belgium	Katleen De Caluwé, Nancy Callaerts, Elodie Ouédraogo, Kim Gevaert	43.57	Q, NR
6	2	Belarus	Yuliya Bartsevich, Nataliya Abramenko, Alena Neumiarzhitskaya, Natallia Safronnikava	43.69	q
7	1	Italy	Daniela Graglia, Vincenza Calì, Manuela Grillo, Manuela Levorato	43.74	Q
8	1	Poland	Beata Szkudlarz, Daria Onyśko, Zuzanna Radecka, Dorota Dydo	43.97	q, SB
9	2	Greece	Ekaterini Thanou, Magdalini Padaleon, Olga Kaidantzi, Georgia Kokloni	44.04	SB
10	1	Spain	Carmen Blay, Arantxa Reinares, Concepción Montaner, Glory Alozie	44.32	
11	2	Sweden	Emma Reinas, Jenny Kallur, Susanna Kallur, Lena Udd	44.33	
12	1	Great Britain	Joice Maduaka, Shani Anderson, Amanda Forrester, Abiodun Oyepitan	44.45	
13	2	Austria	Bettina Müller-Weissina, Sandra Rehrl, Manuela Witting, Karin Mayr	45.05	
	1	Netherlands	Joan van den Akker, Jacqueline Poelman, Pascal van Assendelft, Kristel Spierenburg	DQ	

=== Final ===
Rank	Nation	Athletes	Time	Notes
1st place, gold medalist(s)	France	Delphine Combe, Muriel Hurtis, Sylviane Félix, Odiah Sidibé	42.46	
2nd place, silver medalist(s)	Germany	Melanie Paschke, Gabi Rockmeier, Sina Schielke, Marion Wagner	42.54	
3rd place, bronze medalist(s)	Russia	Natalya Ignatova, Yuliya Tabakova, Irina Khabarova, Larisa Kruglova	43.11	
4	Belgium	Katleen De Caluwé, Nancy Callaerts, Elodie Ouédraogo, Kim Gevaert	43.22	NR
5	Ukraine	Iryna Kozhemyakina, Anzhela Kravchenko, Olena Pastushenko, Tetyana Tkalich	43.38	SB
6	Italy	Daniela Graglia, Vincenza Calì, Manuela Grillo, Manuela Levorato	43.46	SB
7	Poland	Beata Szkudlarz, Daria Onyśko, Agnieszka Rysiukiewicz, Dorota Dydo	43.96	SB
8	Belarus	Yuliya Bartsevich, Nataliya Abramenko, Alena Neumiarzhitskaya, Natallia Safronnikava	44.34	
