= Athletics at the 1996 Summer Olympics – Women's 100 metres =

Women's 100 metres at the Games of the XXVI Olympiad
- Venue: Centennial Olympic Stadium
- Date: 26 July 1996 (heats, quarter-finals); 27 July 1996 (semi-finals, finals)
- Competitors: 56 from 42 nations
- Winning time: 10.94

Medalists
1st place, gold medalist(s)		Gail Devers; United States
2nd place, silver medalist(s)		Merlene Ottey; Jamaica
3rd place, bronze medalist(s)		Gwen Torrence; United States

The women's 100 metres was an event at the 1996 Summer Olympics in Atlanta, Georgia. There were a total number of 56 participating athletes, with two rounds (seven heats in round 1, four heats at round 2), two semifinals and a final. Although both Gail Devers of the United States and Merlene Ottey of Jamaica had clocked the same time in the final at the finish line at 10.94 seconds, snapshot of their photo finish confirmed that Devers had edged Ottey out for the gold medal.

== Records ==
These were the standing world and Olympic records (in seconds) prior to the 1996 Summer Olympics.

World record	10.49	(United States) Florence Griffith-Joyner	Indianapolis (USA)	July 16, 1988
Olympic record	10.62	(United States) Florence Griffith-Joyner	Seoul (KOR)	September 24, 1988

== Results ==
=== Heats ===
==== Heat 1 ====
Rank	Athlete	Nation	Time	Notes
1	Chandra Sturrup	Bahamas	11.24	Q
2	Hanitriniaina Rakotondrabe	Madagascar	11.36	Q
3	Irina Privalova	Russia	11.42	Q
4	Zlatka Georgieva	Bulgaria	11.74	Q
5	Nataliya Vorobyova	Kazakhstan	11.91	
6	Lyudmila Dmitriady	Uzbekistan	12.04	
7	Ouk Chanthan	Cambodia	14.82	

==== Heat 2 ====
Rank	Athlete	Nation	Time	Notes
1	Zhanna Pintusevich	Ukraine	11.20	Q
2	Melanie Paschke	Germany	11.27	Q
3	Odiah Sidibé	France	11.40	Q
4	Mary Tombiri-Shirey	Nigeria	11.50	Q
5	Hermin Joseph	Dominica	11.56	
6	Cleide Amaral	Brazil	11.76	
7	Myriam Mani	Cameroon	11.76	
8	Elvira Cabbarova	Azerbaijan	11.96	

==== Heat 3 ====
Rank	Athlete	Nation	Time	Notes
1	Merlene Ottey	Jamaica	11.13	Q
2	Susanthika Jayasinghe	Sri Lanka	11.18	Q
3	Ekaterini Thanou	Greece	11.35	Q
4	Iryna Pukha	Ukraine	11.36	Q
5	Heather Samuel	Antigua and Barbuda	11.44	q
6	Yan Jiankui	China	11.46	
7	Mirtha Brock	Colombia	11.83	
8	Sortelina Pires	São Tomé and Príncipe	13.31	

==== Heat 4 ====
Rank	Athlete	Nation	Time	Notes
1	Juliet Cuthbert	Jamaica	11.06	Q
2	D'Andre Hill	United States	11.11	Q
3	Silke Lichtenhagen	Germany	11.30	Q
4	Eldece Clarke	Bahamas	11.33	Q
5	Petya Pendareva	Bulgaria	11.59	
6	Cydonie Mothersill	Cayman Islands	11.61	
7	Michelle Baptiste	Saint Lucia	11.92	
8	Natalie Martindale	Saint Vincent and the Grenadines	12.25	

==== Heat 5 ====
Rank	Athlete	Nation	Time	Notes
1	Marina Trandenkova	Russia	11.20	Q
2	Chioma Ajunwa	Nigeria	11.25	Q
3	Myra Mayberry	Puerto Rico	11.51	Q
4	Stephi Douglas	Great Britain	11.61	Q
5	Zandra Borrero	Colombia	11.62	
6	Jerneja Perc	Slovenia	11.63	
7	Beverly McDonald	Jamaica	12.08	
8	Isménia do Frederico	Cape Verde	13.03	

==== Heat 6 ====
Rank	Athlete	Nation	Time	Notes
1	Gwen Torrence	United States	11.11	Q
2	Natalya Voronova	Russia	11.22	Q
3	Lucrécia Jardim	Portugal	11.32	Q
4	Katerina Koffa	Greece	11.33	Q
5	Sanna Hernesniemi	Finland	11.39	q
6	Marcia Richardson	Great Britain	11.42	q
7	Wang Huei-Chen	Chinese Taipei	11.70	
8	Nester Geniwala'a	Solomon Islands	13.74	
9	Juliana Obiong	Equatorial Guinea	13.88	

==== Heat 7 ====
Rank	Athlete	Nation	Time	Notes
1	Gail Devers	United States	10.92	Q
2	Mary Onyali	Nigeria	11.17	Q
3	Andrea Philipp	Germany	11.32	Q
4	Debbie Ferguson	Bahamas	11.33	Q
5	Simmone Jacobs	Great Britain	11.39	q
6	Mireille Donders	Switzerland	11.67	
7	Lee Young-sook	South Korea	11.88	
8	Elizabeth Chávez	Honduras	12.10	NR

=== Quarterfinals ===
==== Quarterfinal 1 ====
Rank	Athlete	Nation	Time	Notes
1	Gwen Torrence	United States	11.11	Q
2	Marina Trandenkova	Russia	11.15	Q
3	Chioma Ajunwa	Nigeria	11.24	Q
4	Odiah Sidibé	France	11.38	Q
5	Katerina Koffa	Greece	11.38	
6	Hanitriniaina Rakotondrabe	Madagascar	11.43	
7	Heather Samuel	Antigua and Barbuda	11.60	
8	Stephi Douglas	Great Britain	11.75	

==== Quarterfinal 2 ====
Rank	Athlete	Nation	Time	Notes
1	Gail Devers	United States	10.94	Q
2	Mary Onyali	Nigeria	11.08	Q
3	Debbie Ferguson	Bahamas	11.26	Q
4	Lucrécia Jardim	Portugal	11.37	Q
5	Andrea Philipp	Germany	11.38	
6	Iryna Pukha	Ukraine	11.42	
7	Marcia Richardson	Great Britain	11.55	
—	Susanthika Jayasinghe	Sri Lanka	DNF	

==== Quarterfinal 3 ====
Rank	Athlete	Nation	Time	Notes
1	Juliet Cuthbert	Jamaica	11.20	Q
2	Chandra Sturrup	Bahamas	11.21	Q
3	D'Andre Hill	United States	11.21	Q
4	Irina Privalova	Russia	11.40	Q
5	Simmone Jacobs	Great Britain	11.47	
6	Ekaterini Thanou	Greece	11.48	
7	Silke Lichtenhagen	Germany	11.53	
8	Mary Tombiri-Shirey	Nigeria	11.56	

==== Quarterfinal 4 ====
Rank	Athlete	Nation	Time	Notes
1	Merlene Ottey	Jamaica	11.02	Q
2	Zhanna Pintusevich	Ukraine	11.14	Q
3	Natalya Voronova	Russia	11.17	Q
4	Melanie Paschke	Germany	11.18	Q
5	Eldece Clarke	Bahamas	11.47	
6	Sanna Hernesniemi	Finland	11.49	
7	Myra Mayberry	Puerto Rico	11.66	
8	Zlatka Georgieva	Bulgaria	11.99	

=== Semifinals ===
==== Semifinal 1 ====
Rank	Athlete	Nation	Time	Notes
1	Merlene Ottey	Jamaica	10.93	Q
2	Gwen Torrence	United States	10.97	Q
3	Marina Trandenkova	Russia	11.07	Q
4	Zhanna Pintusevich	Ukraine	11.14	Q
5	Chioma Ajunwa	Nigeria	11.14	
6	D'Andre Hill	United States	11.20	
7	Debbie Ferguson	Bahamas	11.28	
8	Odiah Sidibé	France	11.35	

==== Semifinal 2 ====
Rank	Athlete	Nation	Time	Notes
1	Gail Devers	United States	11.00	Q
2	Mary Onyali	Nigeria	11.04	Q
3	Natalya Voronova	Russia	11.07	Q
4	Chandra Sturrup	Bahamas	11.07	Q
5	Juliet Cuthbert	Jamaica	11.07	
6	Melanie Paschke	Germany	11.14	
7	Irina Privalova	Russia	11.31	
8	Lucrécia Jardim	Portugal	11.32	

== Final ==
- Held on July 27, 1996

Rank	Lane	Athlete	Nation	Time
1st place, gold medalist(s)	6	Gail Devers	United States	10.94
2nd place, silver medalist(s)	3	Merlene Ottey	Jamaica	10.94
3rd place, bronze medalist(s)	5	Gwen Torrence	United States	10.96
4	7	Chandra Sturrup	Bahamas	11.00
5	1	Marina Trandenkova	Russia	11.06
6	2	Natalya Voronova	Russia	11.10
7	4	Mary Onyali	Nigeria	11.13
8	8	Zhanna Pintusevich	Ukraine	11.14
