= 1997 World Championships in Athletics – Women's 4 × 100 metres relay =

The 4 × 100 metres relay at the 1997 World Championships in Athletics was held at the Olympic Stadium on August 8 and August 9.

== Medals ==
Gold:	Silver:	Bronze:
United States; Chryste Gaines; Marion Jones; Inger Miller; Gail Devers	Jamaica; Beverly McDonald; Merlene Frazer; Juliet Cuthbert; Beverly Grant	France; Patricia Girard; Christine Arron; Delphine Combe; Sylviane Félix

== Results ==
All times shown are in seconds.

AR area record | CR championship record | GR games record | NR national record | OR Olympic record | PB personal best | SB season best | WL world leading (in a given season)
DNS = did not start | DQ = disqualification | NM = no mark (i.e. no valid result) | Q = qualification by place in heat | q = qualification by overall place

=== Semi-finals ===
==== Heat 1 ====
1. United States (Chryste Gaines, Marion Jones, Inger Miller, Gail Devers) 41.52 Q (WL)
2. France (Frédérique Bangué, Christine Arron, Delphine Combe, Sylviane Félix) 42.53 Q (NR)
3. Nigeria (Beatrice Utondu, Endurance Ojokolo, Angela Atede, Chioma Ajunwa) 43.00 Q
4. Greece (Maria Tsoni, Ekaterini Koffa, Marina Vasarmidou, Ekaterini Thanou) 43.15
5. Australia (Nova Peris, Lauren Hewitt, Melinda Gainsford-Taylor, Cathy Freeman) 43.21 (SB)
6. Brazil (Rita da Cassia Araujo Gomes, Katia Regina Santos, Cleide Amaral, Lucimar Aparecida de Moura) 43.89 (NR)
7. Italy (Elena Sordelli, Giada Gallina, Manuela Grillo, Manuela Levorato) 44.16
  - Ukraine (Oksana Kaydash, Viktoriya Fomenko, Iryna Pukha, Anzhela Kravchenko) DQ

==== Heat 2 ====
1. Bahamas (Eldece Clarke-Lewis, Savatheda Fynes, Debbie Ferguson, Pauline Davis-Thompson) 42.19 Q
2. Jamaica (Beverly McDonald, Merlene Frazer, Juliet Cuthbert, Beverly Grant) 42.31 Q (SB)
3. Germany (Melanie Paschke, Esther Möller, Birgit Rockmeier, Andrea Philipp) 42.51 Q (SB)
4. Russia (Olga Povtaryova, Galina Malchugina, Marina Trandenkova, Yekaterina Leshchova) 42.69 q (SB)
5. China (Pei Fang, Yan Jiankui, Liu Xiaomei, Li Xuemei) 42.92 q (AR)
6. Colombia (Sandra Borrero, Felipa Palacios, Patricia Rodríguez, Mirtha Brock) 43.51 (SB)
7. Finland (Sanna Koivisto, Johanna Manninen, Sanna Hernesniemi-Kyllönen, Anu Pirttimaa) 44.08 (SB)
8. Japan (Hideko Kijinami, Kaori Yoshida, Toshie Iwamoto, Motoka Arai) 44.56

=== Final ===
1. United States (Chryste Gaines, Marion Jones, Inger Miller, Gail Devers) 41.47 (CR)
2. Jamaica (Beverly McDonald, Merlene Frazer, Juliet Cuthbert, Beverly Grant) 42.10 (SB)
3. France (Patricia Girard, Christine Arron, Delphine Combe, Sylviane Félix) 42.21 (NR)
4. Germany (Melanie Paschke, Esther Möller, Birgit Rockmeier, Andrea Philipp) 42.44 (SB)
5. Russia (Olga Povtaryova, Galina Malchugina, Marina Trandenkova, Yekaterina Leshchova) 42.50 (SB)
6. Bahamas (Eldece Clarke-Lewis, Savatheda Fynes, Debbie Ferguson, Pauline Davis-Thompson) 42.77
7. Nigeria (Beatrice Utondu, Endurance Ojokolo, Angela Atede, Falilat Ogunkoya) 43.27
8. China (Pei Fang, Yan Jiankui, Liu Xiaomei, Li Xuemei) 43.32
