= Jamaica at the 1998 Commonwealth Games =

- Flag of Jamaica
- CG code: JAM
- CGA: Jamaica Olympic Association
- Website: joa.org.jm

in Kuala Lumpur, Malaysia 11 September 1998 – 21 September 1998
- Medals Ranked 9th: Gold 4 Silver 2 Bronze 0 Total 6

Commonwealth Games appearances (overview)
- 1934; 1938–1950; 1954; 1958; 1962; 1966; 1970; 1974; 1978; 1982; 1986; 1990; 1994; 1998; 2002; 2006; 2010; 2014; 2018; 2022; 2026; 2030

Jamaica competed at the 1998 Commonwealth Games in Kuala Lumpur, Malaysia from 11 to 21 September 1998. It was Jamaica's 12th appearance at the Commonwealth Games.

== Medalists ==
The following Jamaican competitors won medals at the games. In the discipline sections below, the medalists' names are bolded.

Medal	Name	Sport	Event
Gold	Dinsdale Morgan	Athletics	Men's 400 metres hurdles
Gold	Davian Clarke; Greg Haughton; Michael McDonald; Roxbert Martin	Athletics	Men's 4 × 400 metres relay
Gold	Sandie Richards	Athletics	Women's 400 metres
Gold	Gillian Russell	Athletics	Women's 100 metres hurdles
Silver	Juliet Campbell	Athletics	Women's 200 metres
Silver	Donnette Brown; Juliet Campbell; Gillian Russell; Brigitte Foster	Athletics	Women's 4 × 100 metres relay

== Cricket ==
Jamaica named the below squad for the tournament.

Roster

- Jimmy Adams (c)
- Gareth Breese
- Andre Coley (wk)
- Ryan Cunningham
- Leon Garrick
- Wavell Hinds
- Nehemiah Perry
- Kirk Powell
- Tony Powell
- O'Neil Richards
- Robert Samuels
- Audley Sanson
- Laurie Williams
- Carl Wright

Summary

Team	Event	Group stage				Semifinal	Final / BM	
Team	Event	Opposition Result	Opposition Result	Opposition Result	Rank	Opposition Result	Opposition Result	Rank
Jamaica men	Men's tournament	Zimbabwe; **L** by 6 wickets	Sri Lanka; **L** by 67 runs	Malaysia; **W** by 6 wickets	3	did not advance		10

Group stage

Group A
Pos	Team	Pld	W	L	T	NR	Pts	NRR
1	Sri Lanka	3	3	0	0	0	**6**	1.581
2	Zimbabwe	3	2	1	0	0	**4**	1.887
3	Jamaica	3	1	2	0	0	**2**	−0.122
4	Malaysia	3	0	3	0	0	**0**	−3.736

Source: ESPNcricinfo

9 September 1998
10:00
Scorecard

**Jamaica**; 142 (38.2 overs)	**v**	**Zimbabwe**; 144/4 (36.4 overs)
Tony Powell 41; Grant Flower 2/5 (4 overs)		Craig Evans 55* (43); Laurie Williams 2/42 (9.4 overs)

**Zimbabwe won by 6 wickets**
Royal Selangor Club, Kuala Lumpur
Umpires: Darrell Hair (Aus) and Rudi Koertzen (SA)

- Zimbabwe won the toss and elected to field.
- Andre Coley and O'Neil Richards (Jam) both made their List A debut.
- Points: Zimbabwe 2, Jamaica 0.

12 September 1998
10:00
Scorecard

**Sri Lanka**; 211/5 (50 overs)	**v**	**Jamaica**; 144/8 (50 overs)
Avishka Gunawardene 107; Kirk Powell 1/28 (8 overs)		Jimmy Adams 34*; Russel Arnold 2/17 (10 overs)

**Sri Lanka won by 67 runs**
Perbadanan Kemajuan Negeri Selangor Sports Complex, Petaling Jaya
Umpires: Dave Orchard (SA) and V. K. Ramaswamy (Ind)

- Jamaica won the toss and elected to field.
- Avishka Gunawardene (SL) scored his maiden List A century.
- Points: Sri Lanka 2, Jamaica 0.
- Jamaica were eliminated as a result of this match.

14 September 1998
10:00
Scorecard

**Malaysia**; 83 (48.3 overs)	**v**	**Jamaica**; 87/4 (21 overs)
Ramesh Menon 19; Ryan Cunningham 4/13 (10 overs)		Tony Powell 20*; Suresh Navaratnam 2/23 (6 overs)

**Jamaica won by 6 wickets**
Victoria Institution, Kuala Lumpur
Umpires: Ismail Khan (Mas) and Saleem Badar (Pak)

- Malaysia won the toss and elected to bat.
- Carl Wright and Ryan Cunningham (Jam) both made their List A debut.
- Audley Sanson (Jam) played his only List A match.
- Rakesh Madhavan, David Thalalla, Ramesh Menon, Suresh Navaratnam, Matthew William, Kunjiraman Ramadas, Rohan Selvaratnam, Siswanto Haidi, Shankar Retinam, Rohan Suppiah, Chew Pok Cheong (Mas) and O'Neil Richards (Jam) all played their final List A match.
- Points: Jamaica 2, Malaysia 0.

== Netball ==
Squad

- Nadine Bryan
- Margaret Byfield
- Elaine Davis
- Roniesh Davis
- Connie Francis
- Nadine French
- Georgia Gordon
- Oberon Pitterson
- Nerine Riley
- Sharmalee Watkins
- Tashna Walker
- Sharon Wiles

Summary

Jamaica finished fifth in the netball at the 1998 Commonwealth Games. In the group stages, they won three of their five matches.

Group A

14 September 1998	**Jamaica**	**74–36**	**Canada**

15 September 1998	**England**	**52–51**	**Jamaica**

16 September 1998	**Malaysia**	**26–83**	**Jamaica**

17 September 1998	**Australia**	**70–38**	**Jamaica**

18 September 1998	**Jamaica**	**71–39**	**Barbados**

Pos	Team	P	W	D	L	GF	GA	GD	Pts
1	Australia	5	5	0	0	377	145	+232	10
2	England	5	4	0	1	257	197	+60	8
3	Jamaica	5	3	0	2	317	223	-94	6
4	Barbados	5	2	0	3	219	267	-48	4
5	Canada	5	1	0	4	195	306	-111	2
6	Malaysia	5	0	0	5	120	347	-227	0

Qualified for Semi-final 1
Qualified for Semi-final 2
