= Athletics at the 1997 Jeux de la Francophonie =

Athletics at the III Jeux de la Francophonie
- Host city: Antananarivo, Madagascar
- Events: 43
- Participation: 30 nations
- Records set: 8 Games records

At the 1997 Jeux de la Francophonie, the athletics events were held in Antananarivo, Madagascar in August and September 1997. A total of 43 events were contested, of which 23 by male and 20 by female athletes. Of the forty nations present at the competition, fifteen reached the medal table in the athletics competition.

The regional leader France easily topped the medal table with eleven gold medals and 38 in total. This was almost twice as many as second placed Canada (seven golds and twenty altogether). The hosts Madagascar had a strong showing in third place with seven golds and 16 medals – a performance which helped it into second place in the medals at the games. Senegal and Romania were the next best performers with four golds each.

A total of eight games records were set during the competition. On the men's side, Jean-Olivier Zirignon won the 100 metres in 10.07 seconds, Alejandro Argudin ran 49.22 seconds for the 400 metres hurdles, the high jump saw Mike Caza and Khemraj Naiko both reach 2.23 m, Cheikh Touré won the long jump with 8.19 m and Bouna Diop set a new javelin throw standard of 75.82 m. On the women's side Denisa Costescu ran 16:44.2 minutes to win the inaugural 5000 metres title (which replaced the previous 3000 metres event), Laurence Manfredi threw a record of 16.70 m in the shot put and Kim Vanderhoek set a heptathlon games best of 5650 points.

== Medal summary ==
=== Men ===
Event	Gold		Silver		Bronze	
100 metres (wind: +0.3 m/s)	Jean-Olivier Zirignon (CIV)	10.07 GR	Souleymane Meité (CIV)	10.33	Antoine Boussombo (GAB)	10.42
200 metres (wind: -2.2 m/s)	Joseph Loua (GUI)	20.54	Souleymane Meité (CIV)	20.94	Antoine Boussombo (GAB)	21.00
400 metres	Ibrahima Wade (SEN)	45.74	Hachim Ndiaye (SEN)	46.16	Eric Milazar (MRI)	46.67
800 metres	Arthémon Hatungimana (BDI)	1:46.83	Zach Whitmarsh (CAN)	1:48.02	Assane Diallo (SEN)	1:48.26
1500 metres	Ovidiu Olteanu (ROM)	3:45.37	Allan Klassen (CAN)	3:45.71	Halez Taguelmint (FRA)	3:47.67
5000 metres	Vital Gahungu (BDI)	14:45.3	Nicolae Negru (ROM)	14:46.1	Haja Ramananjatovo (MAD)	14:46.6
10,000 metres	Haja Ramananjatovo (MAD)	29:55.8	Tharcisse Gashaka (BDI)	29:58.02	Nicolae Negru (ROM)	30:21.33
Marathon	Pascal Fétizon (FRA)	2:24:34	Souley Oumarou (NIG)	2:34:12	Jean de la Croix Mahatana (MAD)	2:44:10
110 metres hurdles	Jonathan Nsenga (BEL)	13.56	Jean-Marc Grava (FRA)	13.71	Sébastien Denis (FRA)	13.72
400 metres hurdles	Alejandro Argudin (ROM)	49.22 GR	Jean-Paul Bruwier (BEL)	50.02	Gilbert Hashan (MRI)	50.46
3000 metres steeplechase	Graeme Fell (CAN)	8:55.56	Jean-Nicolas Duval (Quebec)	8:56.16	Thomas Toyi (BDI)	8:57.38
4×100 metres relay	Ivory Coast (CIV); Éric Pacôme N'Dri; Jean-Olivier Zirignon; Ahmed Douhou; Ibrahim Meité	38.7	Cameroon (CMR); Alfred Moussambani; Serge Bengono; Issa-Aimé Nthépé; Benjamin Sirimou	39.3	Benin (BEN); Patrick Mocci-Raoumbe; Charles Tayot; Lueyi Dovy; Antoine Boussombo	39.5
4×400 metres relay	Senegal (SEN); Seydou Loum; Hachim Ndiaye; Alpha Babacar Sall; Ibrahima Wade	3:02.0	Mauritius (MRI); Fernando Augustin; Rudy Tirvengadum; Gilbert Hashan; Eric Milazar	3:07.3	France (FRA); Ousmane Diarra; Jean-Laurent Heusse; David Kafka; Marc Raquil	3:07.4
20 km walk	Hatem Ghoula (TUN)	1:26:39	Sylvain Caudron (FRA)	1:27:59	Pascal Servanty (FRA)	1:29:30
High jump	Mike Caza (CAN)	2.23 m GR	Khemraj Naiko (MRI)	2.23 m GR	Olivier Sanou (BUR)	2.15 m
Pole vault	Nicolas Jolivet (FRA)	5.40 m	Mathieu Boisrond (FRA)	5.20 m	Jeff Miller (CAN)	5.10 m
Long jump	Cheikh Touré (SEN)	8.19 m GR	Franck Zio (BUR)	8.02 m (w)	Mike Laberge (CAN)	7.82 m
Triple jump	Toussaint Rabenala (MAD)	16.50 m	Oral O'Gilvie (CAN)	16.49 m	Jimmy Gabriel (FRA)	16.46 m
Shot put	Stéphane Vial (FRA)	17.79 m	Rocky Vaitanaki (FRA)	17.75 m	Raphaël Cécé (FRA)	17.14 m
Discus throw	Costel Grasu (ROM)	59.02 m	Jean-Claude Retel (FRA)	58.11 m	Mickaël Conjungo (CAF)	57.47 m
Hammer throw	Frédéric Kuhn (FRA)	70.90 m	David Chaussinand (FRA)	69.62 m	John Stoikos (CAN)	68.40 m
Javelin throw	Bouna Diop (SEN)	75.82 m GR	Vitolio Tipotio (FRA)	72.61 m	Maher Ridane (TUN)	70.63 m
Decathlon	Pierre Salamand (FRA)	7477 pts	Yves Bourgey (FRA)	7376 pts	Anis Riahi (TUN)	7356 pts

=== Women ===
Event	Gold		Silver		Bronze	
100 metres (wind: -1.9 m/s)	Hanitriniaina Rakotondrabe (MAD)	11.51	Georgette Nkoma (CMR)	11.65	Lalao Ravaonirina (MAD)	11.66
200 metres (wind: +0.1 m/s)	LaToya Austin (CAN)	23.40	Anita Mormand (FRA)	23.53	Aïda Diop (SEN)	23.78
400 metres	Marie-Louise Bévis (FRA)	52.91	Fabienne Ficher (FRA)	52.99	Mireille Nguimgo (CMR)	53.18
800 metres	Karen Goetze (FRA)	2:06.32	Jean Fletcher (CAN)	2:06.37	Virginie Fouquet (FRA)	2:06.73
1500 metres	Cindy O'Krane (CAN)	4:19.80	Céline Rajot (FRA)	4:23.68	Martine Rasoarimalala (MAD)	4:26.32
5000 metres	Denisa Costescu (ROM)	16:44.2 GR	Rodica Nagel (FRA)	17:04.5	Nathalie Deroubaix (BEL)	17:06.7
10,000 metres	Jackie Mota (CAN)	34:27.57	Clarisse Rasoarizay (MAD)	34:59.75	Tina Connelly (CAN)	35:27.21
100 metres hurdles (wind: -1.3 m/s)	Nicole Ramalalanirina (MAD)	13.21	Isabelle Corréa (FRA)	13.60	Mame Tacko Diouf (SEN)	13.68
400 metres hurdles	Aurélie Jonary (MAD)	57.20	Cendrino Razaiarimalala (MAD)	57.28	Mame Tacko Diouf (SEN)	57.33
4×100 metres relay	Madagascar (MAD) ? Lalao Ravaonirina; Monica Rahanitraniriana; Hanitriniaina Rakotrondrabe	44.45	France (FRA); Isabelle Correa; Marie-Joëlle Dogbo; Nathalie Polin; Linda Ferga	44.46	Canada (CAN); Erika Witter; Lisa Nicole Kosh; Dena Burrows; LaToya Austin	44.61
4×400 metres relay	Cameroon (CMR); Myriam Léonie Mani; Georgette Nkoma; Carine Eyenga; Delphine Atangana	3:34.40	France (FRA); Marie-Louise Bévis; Sylvie Birba; Fabienne Ficher; Anita Mormand	3:34.99	Madagascar (MAD); Aurelie Jonary; Cendrino Razaiarimalala; Monica Rahanitraniriana; Paule Ony Ratsimbazafy	3:35.09
Marathon	Clarisse Rasoarizay (MAD)	2:56:24	Elysée Razafimahatratra (MAD)	3:02:16	Sonia Agoun (TUN)	3:06:13
10 km walk	Anne-Catherine Berthonnaud (FRA)	49:18	Fatiha Ouali (FRA)	50:51	Marina Crivello (Quebec)	56:04
High jump	Sabrina De Leeuw (BEL)	1.85 m	Nathalie Belfort (Quebec)	1.82 m	Irène Tiendrébéogo (BUR)	1.82 m
Long jump	Vanessa Monar-Enweani (CAN)	6.30 m	Linda Ferga (FRA)	6.29 m	Doris Randriamaro (MAD)	6.04 m
Triple jump	Valérie Guiyoule (FRA)	13.98 m	Françoise Mbango Etone (CMR)	13.75 m	Michelle Hastick (CAN)	13.64 m
Shot put	Laurence Manfredi (FRA)	16.70 m GR	Georgette Reed (CAN)	15.97 m	Amel Ben Khaled (TUN)	14.95 m
Discus throw	Isabelle Devaluez (FRA)	55.81 m	Catherine Gery (FRA)	47.46 m	Georgette Reed (CAN)	46.73 m
Javelin throw (old model)	Isabelle Surprenant (Quebec)	49.99 m	Bernadette Perrine (MRI)	49.85 m	Sandy Taylor (CAN)	46.25 m
Heptathlon	Kim Vanderhoek (CAN)	5650 pts GR	Guilaine Graw (FRA)	5544 pts	Muriel Crozet (FRA)	5296 pts

== Medal table ==
* Host nation (Madagascar)

Rank	Nation	Gold	Silver	Bronze	Total
1	France (FRA)	11	19	8	38
2	Canada (CAN)	7	5	8	20
3	Madagascar (MAD)*	7	3	6	16
4	Senegal (SEN)	4	1	4	9
5	Romania (ROM)	4	1	1	6
6	Ivory Coast (CIV)	2	2	0	4
7	Belgium (BEL)	2	1	1	4
7	Burundi (BDI)	2	1	1	4
9	Cameroon (CMR)	1	3	1	5
10	Quebec (QBC)	1	2	1	4
11	Tunisia (TUN)	1	0	4	5
12	Guinea (GUI)	1	0	0	1
13	Mauritius (MRI)	0	3	2	5
14	Burkina Faso (BUR)	0	1	2	3
15	Niger (NIG)	0	1	0	1
16	Gabon (GAB)	0	0	2	2
17	Benin (BEN)	0	0	1	1
17	Central African Republic (CAF)	0	0	1	1
Totals (18 entries)		43	43	43	129
