= Athletics at the 1998 Commonwealth Games – Women's 200 metres =

Women's 200 metres at the Commonwealth Games
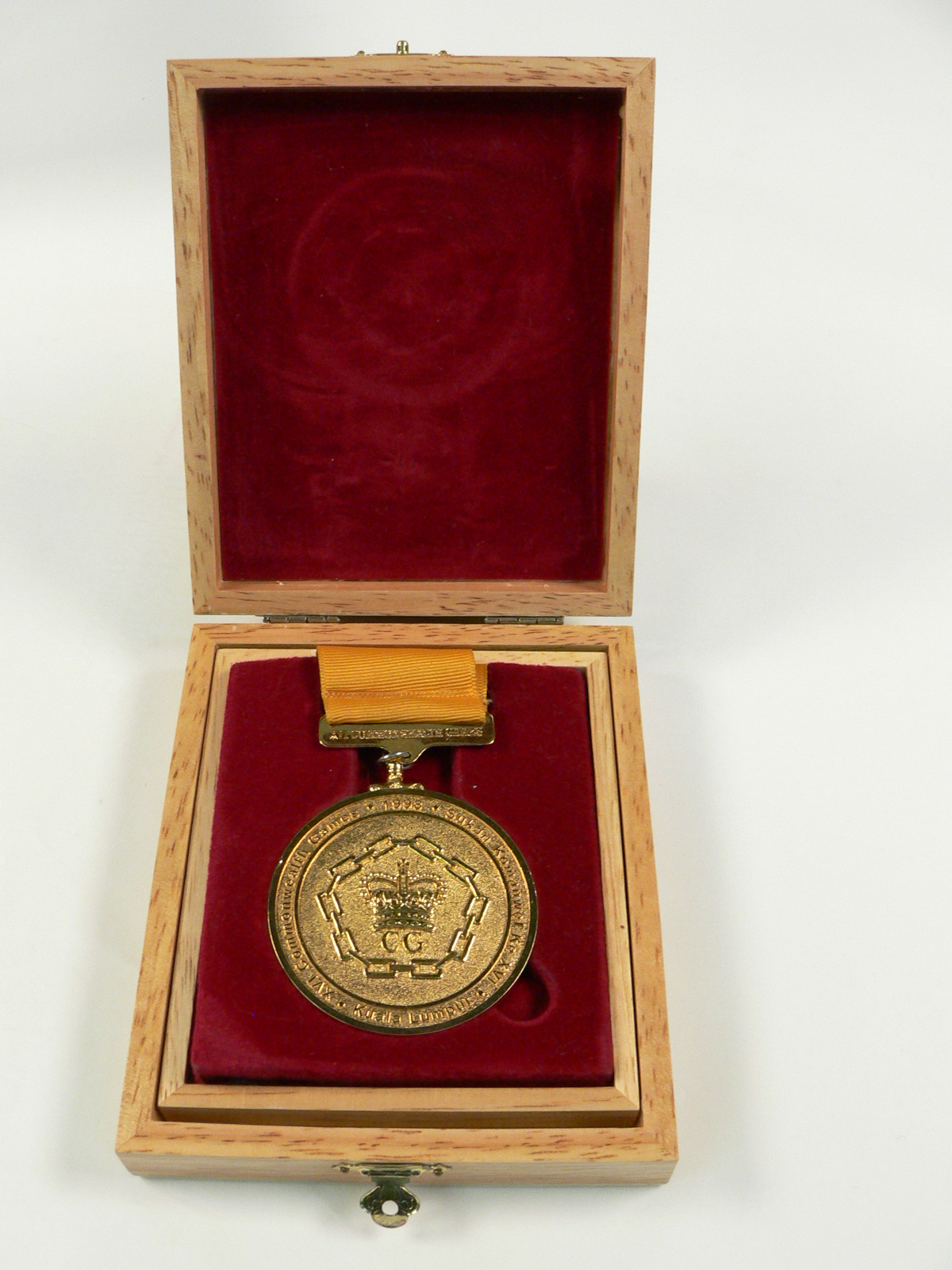
- Nova Peris Kneebone's gold medal

The women's 200 metres event at the 1998 Commonwealth Games was held 18–19 September on National Stadium, Bukit Jalil.

== Medalists ==
Gold	Silver	Bronze
Nova Peris-Kneebone; Australia	Juliet Campbell; Jamaica	Lauren Hewitt; Australia

== Results ==
=== Heats ===
Qualification: First 3 of each heat (Q) and the next 4 fastest (q) qualified for the semifinals.

Wind:
Heat 1: -0.5 m/s, Heat 2: +0.2 m/s, Heat 3: -0.2 m/s, Heat 4: -0.3 m/s

Rank	Heat	Name	Nationality	Time	Notes
1	3	Melinda Gainsford-Taylor	Australia	22.98	Q
2	1	Juliet Campbell	Jamaica	23.11	Q
3	1	Nova Peris-Kneebone	Australia	23.15	Q
4	4	Philomena Mensah	Canada	23.24	Q
5	1	Vida Nsiah	Ghana	23.25	Q
6	2	Lauren Hewitt	Australia	23.44	Q
7	3	Joice Maduaka	England	23.53	Q
8	2	Heide Seyerling	South Africa	23.64	Q
9	4	Monica Twum	Ghana	23.69	Q
10	2	Simmone Jacobs	England	23.71	Q
11	4	Marcia Richardson	England	23.73	Q
12	2	Shanti Govindasamy	Malaysia	23.77	q
13	1	Tamara Perry	Canada	23.80	q
14	3	Atia Weekes	Canada	24.07	Q
15	3	Mavis Akoto	Ghana	24.09	q, PB
16	4	Leticia John Mutta	Tanzania	24.31	q
17	2	Veronica Wabukawo	Uganda	24.52	
18	1	Heather Samuel	Antigua and Barbuda	24.56	
19	1	Marang Kinteh	Gambia	25.18	
20	4	Stephanie Llewellyn	Northern Ireland	26.07	
21	4	Sudati Masasu	Uganda	26.32	
	2	Dora Kyriacou	Cyprus	DNS	
	3	Sonia Williams	Antigua and Barbuda	DNS	
	3	Myriam Léonie Mani	Cameroon	DNS	
	4	Chandra Sturrup	Bahamas	DNS	

=== Semifinals ===
Qualification: First 4 of each heat qualified directly (Q) for the final.

Wind:
Heat 1: -0.5 m/s, Heat 2: -0.3 m/s

Rank	Heat	Name	Nationality	Time	Notes
1	2	Melinda Gainsford-Taylor	Australia	22.79	Q
2	1	Juliet Campbell	Jamaica	23.05	Q
2	1	Nova Peris-Kneebone	Australia	23.05	Q
2	2	Lauren Hewitt	Australia	23.05	Q
5	2	Vida Nsiah	Ghana	23.20	Q
6	2	Heide Seyerling	South Africa	23.26	Q
7	1	Philomena Mensah	Canada	23.47	Q
8	2	Joice Maduaka	England	23.50	
9	1	Monica Twum	Ghana	23.60	Q
10	2	Shanti Govindasamy	Malaysia	23.72	
11	1	Simmone Jacobs	England	23.73	
12	1	Marcia Richardson	England	23.82	
13	1	Tamara Perry	Canada	23.89	
14	2	Atia Weekes	Canada	24.15	
15	1	Mavis Akoto	Ghana	24.16	
	2	Leticia John Mutta	Tanzania	DNS	

=== Final ===
Wind: +0.1 m/s

Rank	Lane	Name	Nationality	Time	Notes
1st place, gold medalist(s)	5	Nova Peris-Kneebone	Australia	22.77	PB
2nd place, silver medalist(s)	3	Juliet Campbell	Jamaica	22.79	SB
3rd place, bronze medalist(s)	4	Lauren Hewitt	Australia	22.83	SB
4	6	Melinda Gainsford-Taylor	Australia	23.04	
5	7	Heide Seyerling	South Africa	23.07	SB
6	8	Vida Nsiah	Ghana	23.17	SB
7	2	Philomena Mensah	Canada	23.38	
8	1	Monica Twum	Ghana	23.73	
