= Sabrina Mulrain =

German sprinter

Sabrina Mulrain (born 10 June 1978) is a retired German sprinter who specialized in the 200 metres.

She won the 200 metres gold medal at the 1997 European Junior Championships and finished sixth in the 4 x 100 metre relay at the 2000 Olympic Games, with teammates Gabi Rockmeier, Andrea Philipp and Marion Wagner. She also competed in the individual distance at the 2000 Olympic Games as well as at the 1999 World Championships without reaching the final.

Mulrain represented the sports club Rumelner TV and won a silver medal at the German 200 metres championships in 200. Her personal best time was 22.73 seconds, achieved in June 1999 in Paris. Today she works as a teacher for sports and geography in Germany.
