= 2003 World Championships in Athletics – Women's 4 × 100 metres relay =

These are the official results of the Women's 4 × 100 metres event at the 2003 IAAF World Championships in Paris, France. Their final was held on Saturday 30 August 2003 at 19:45h.

== Final ==
RANK	NATION	ATHLETES	TIME
	France (FRA)	• Patricia Girard • Muriel Hurtis-Houairi • Sylviane Félix • Christine Arron	41.78; NR, WL
	United States (USA)	• Angela Williams • Chryste Gaines • Inger Miller • Torri Edwards	41.83
	Russia (RUS)	• Olga Fedorova • Yuliya Tabakova • Marina Kislova • Larisa Kruglova	42.66
4.	Ukraine (UKR)	• Tetyana Tkalich • Anzhela Kravchenko • Olena Pastushenko-Sinyavina • Oksana Kaydash	43.07
5.	Germany (GER)	• Melanie Paschke • Marion Wagner • Sandra Möller • Katja Wakan	43.27
6.	Belgium (BEL)	• Katleen De Caluwé • Audrey Rochtus • Élodie Ouédraogo • Kim Gevaert	43.45
7.	Belarus (BLR)	• Yulia Nestsiarenka • Aksana Drahun • Alena Neumiarzhitskaya • Natallia Safronnikava	43.47
—	Jamaica (JAM)	• Vonette Dixon • Elva Goulbourne • Beverly McDonald • Brigitte Foster-Hylton	DNF

== Heats ==
- Held on Friday 29 August 2003

=== Heat 1 ===
RANK	NATION	ATHLETES	TIME
1.	United States (USA)	• Angela Williams • Chryste Gaines • Inger Miller • Lauryn Williams	42.06
2.	Russia (RUS)	• Olga Fedorova • Yuliya Tabakova • Marina Kislova • Larisa Kruglova	42.62
3.	Belarus (BLR)	• Yulia Nestsiarenka • Aksana Drahun • Alena Neumiarzhitskaya • Natallia Safronnikava	43.11; NR
4.	Greece (GRE)	• Georgia Kokloni • Magdalini Padaleon • Marina Vasarmidou • Ekaterini Thanou	43.81
5.	Spain (ESP)	• Carmen Blay • Belén Recio • Cristina Sanz • Glory Alozie	44.08
6.	Ivory Coast (CIV)	• Matagari Diazasouba • Affoué Amandine Allou • Marie Gnahoré • Louise Ayétotché	45.60

=== Heat 2 ===
RANK	NATION	ATHLETES	TIME
1.	Ukraine (UKR)	• Tetyana Tkalich • Anzhela Kravchenko • Olena Pastushenko-Sinyavina • Oksana Kaydash	43.26
2.	Belgium (BEL)	• Katleen De Caluwé • Audrey Rochtus • Élodie Ouédraogo • Kim Gevaert	43.36
3.	Bahamas (BAH)	• Tamicka Clarke • Savatheda Fynes • Debbie Ferguson-McKenzie • Shandria Brown	43.64
4.	Cuba (CUB)	• Dainelky Pérez • Roxana Díaz • Virgen Benavides • Misleidys Lazo	43.82
5.	Netherlands (NED)	• Joan van den Akker • Jacqueline Poelman • Pascal van Assendelft • Annemarie Kramer	43.96
6.	Australia (AUS)	• Amy Harris • Sharon Cripps • Lauren Hewitt • Sally McLellan	44.11
—	Nigeria (NGR)	• Mary Onyali-Omagbemi • Joan Uduak Ekah • Endurance Ojokolo • Mercy Nku	DNS

=== Heat 3 ===
RANK	NATION	ATHLETES	TIME
1.	France (FRA)	• Patricia Girard • Muriel Hurtis-Houairi • Sylviane Félix • Christine Arron	42.04; NR
2.	Jamaica (JAM)	• Lacena Golding-Clarke • Elva Goulbourne • Beverly McDonald • Brigitte Foster-Hylton	43.05
3.	Germany (GER)	• Melanie Paschke • Marion Wagner • Sandra Möller • Katja Wakan	43.34
4.	Japan (JPN)	• Tomoko Ishida • Ayumi Suzuki • Kaori Sakagami • Motoka Arai	44.57
5.	Uzbekistan (UZB)	• Guzel Khubbieva • Lyudmila Dmitriadi • Anna Kazakova • Anastasiya Juravleva	45.74
—	Slovenia (SLO)	• Alenka Bikar • Kristina Žumer • Maja Nose • Merlene Ottey	DQ
—	Sweden (SWE)	• Susanna Kallur • Carolina Klüft • Jenny Kallur • Jenny Ljunggren	DNF
