= Monica Twum =

Ghanaian sprinter

Medal record

Women's athletics

Representing Ghana

African Championships
Gold medal – first place	2000 Algiers	4×100 m
Bronze medal – third place	1998 Dakar	4×100 m
Bronze medal – third place	2000 Algiers	100 m

Monica Afia Twum (born 14 March 1978) is a female track and field sprinter from Ghana. Together with Mavis Akoto, Vida Anim and Vida Nsiah she holds the Ghanaian record in 4 x 100 metres relay with 43.19 seconds, achieved during the heats at the 2000 Summer Olympics in Sydney.

Twum was an All-American sprinter for the TCU Horned Frogs track and field team, placing 6th in the 60 metres at the 2001 NCAA Division I Indoor Track and Field Championships. She struggled with hamstring injuries until her senior year in 2003.

== Achievements ==
Year	Competition	Venue	Position	Event	Notes
Representing Ghana
1997	African Junior Championships	Ibadan, Nigeria	2nd	100 m	12.42
1997	African Junior Championships	Ibadan, Nigeria	2nd	200 m	24.28
1997	African Junior Championships	Ibadan, Nigeria	3rd	400 m	54.35
1998	Commonwealth Games	Kuala Lumpur, Malaysia	15th (h)	100 m	11.72
1998	Commonwealth Games	Kuala Lumpur, Malaysia	8th	200 m	23.73
1998	Commonwealth Games	Kuala Lumpur, Malaysia	4th	4 × 100 m relay	43.81
1999	World Championships	Seville, Spain	40th (h)	100 m	11.70
1999	All-Africa Games	Johannesburg, South Africa	7th	100 m	11.48
1999	All-Africa Games	Johannesburg, South Africa	3rd	200 m	22.98
1999	All-Africa Games	Johannesburg, South Africa	3rd	4 × 100 m relay	44.21
2000	African Championships	Algiers, Algeria	3rd	100 m	11.47
2000	African Championships	Algiers, Algeria	1st	4 × 100 m relay	43.99
2000	Olympic Games	Sydney, Australia	31st (qf)	100 m	11.70
2000	Olympic Games	Sydney, Australia	35th (h)	200 m	23.51
2000	Olympic Games	Sydney, Australia	9th (sf)	4 × 100 m relay	43.19

=== Personal bests ===
- 100 metres - 11.31 s (2001)
- 200 metres - 22.98 s (1999)
