= Pančić =

Pančić (Serbian Cyrillic: Панчић) is a Serbian surname. Notable people with the surname include:

- Elvira Pančić (born 1980), Serbian sprinter
- Josif Pančić (1814–1888), Serbian botanist
- Zoran Pančić (born 1953), Serbian rower
