= Ony Paule Ratsimbazafy =

Malagasy sprinter

Medal record

Women's athletics

Representing Madagascar

African Championships
Silver medal – second place	1998 Dakar	4×100 m
Bronze medal – third place	1998 Dakar	400 m

Ony Paule Ratsimbazafy (born 3 January 1976) is a retired Malagasy sprinter who specialized in the 400 metres.

In 1998 she won the bronze medal at the African Championships, and was therefore selected to represent Africa in 4 × 400 metres relay at the 1998 IAAF World Cup. The team, with Ratsimbazafy, Amy Mbacké Thiam, Tacko Diouf and Falilat Ogunkoya, finished seventh.

Ratsimbazafy then competed in 4 × 100 metres relay at the 1999 World Championships and 2000 Olympic Games, both times without progressing from the heat, although a national record of 43.61 seconds was set at the Olympics.

Her personal best time over 400 m was 52.05 seconds, achieved in July 1998 in Paris. This is also a current Malagasy record.
