= Passion Richardson =

American sprinter

Personal information
- Born: January 25, 1975 (age 51) Fort Bragg, North Carolina, U.S.

Sport
- Sport: Track and field
- Club: Kentucky Wildcats
Medal record
Representing United States
Olympic Games
Bronze medal – third place	2000 Sydney	4 × 100 m relay
Pan American Games
Silver medal – second place	1999 Winnipeg	4 × 100 m relay
Summer Universiade
Gold medal – first place	1997 Catania	4 × 100 m relay

Passion J. Richardson (born January 25, 1975) is an American former track and field athlete who competed in sprinting events.

She had most of her success with the American women's 4 × 100 m relay team. She ran in the heats at the 2000 Summer Olympics and the Americans won the bronze medal in the final. Marion Jones (who replaced Richardson in the final) later admitted to doping and Richardson and her teammates lodged an appeal with the Court of Arbitration for Sport in order to retain their medals.

Aside from her Olympic appearance she was a relay gold medalist at the 1997 Summer Universiade and silver medalist at the 1999 Pan American Games. Individually, she was a 100-meter dash finalist at the USA Outdoor Track and Field Championships in 1999 and 2000. Her best national placing was runner-up in the 60-meter dash at the USA Indoor Track and Field Championships in 2000.

She retired from the sport in 2001 and returned to her alma mater, the University of Kentucky, as a track coach.

== Career ==
Born in Fort Bragg, North Carolina, she grew up in Ohio and attended Berea High School, Berea, Ohio. After graduating in 1993 she went on to study marketing at the University of Kentucky. While there she competed athletically for the Kentucky Wildcats and gained four All-American honours: she was an indoor 55 metres finalist in 1994 and 1996, a 4 × 100 metres relay finalist in 1996, and a 100 metres finalist in 1997.

In 1997 she set a personal record of 11.28 seconds for the 100 m at the United States Outdoor Track and Field Championships. She also won her first international medal that year, taking the gold in the 4 × 100 m relay at the 1997 World University Games. At the end of the year she ran a best of 7.20 seconds for the 60-meter dash. She came close to a medal in that event at the 1998 United States Indoor Track and Field Championships, ending up in fourth place. She failed to get past the heats of the outdoor 100 m event later that year. In 1999 she was a finalist in both the 60 m (sixth) and the 100 m (eighth) at the national championships. A second international relay medal came for Richardson at the 1999 Pan American Games, as the team took the silver medals.

At the 2000 USA Indoor Championships she claimed second place in the 60 m, equalling her personal record. She took eighth place at the United States Olympic Trials – a finish which earned her the honour of being the alternate heat runner for the United States at the 2000 Summer Olympics. At the 2000 Sydney Olympics she ran the relay team through the heats and semi-final stage, alongside Chryste Gaines, Torri Edwards and Nanceen Perry, before being switched for Marion Jones in the final. Jones later admitted to using performance-enhancing drugs during the games. Richardson and the other runners filed an appeal at the Court of Arbitration for Sport to contest their disqualification and retain their medals. In her defense, she said in an interview on The Early Show: "I competed fairly. I should not have to suffer the consequences for someone else's bad decisions and choices...I don’t believe that I should have to give back my medal...you don't know what was going on in the other teams, so how do you really rectify that situation? There's really no positive outcome in either way that it goes."

After the Sydney Olympics, her career began to wind down. Her fifth-place finish in the 60 m at the national indoor championships was her last performance at the national level. She returned to her alma mater in the middle of that year and she became an assistant coach on the Kentucky Wildcats staff.

== Personal records ==
- 55-meter dash – 6.83 seconds (1999)
- 60-meter dash – 7.20 seconds (1997)
- 100-meter dash – 11.28 seconds (1997)
- 200-meter dash – 23.56 seconds (2000)
