= Anne-Marie Mouri-Nkeng =

Cameroonian sprinter

Personal information
- Nationality: Cameroonian
- Born: 30 November 1975 (age 50)

Sport
- Sport: Sprinting
- Event: 4 × 100 metres relay
Medal record
Women's athletics
Representing Cameroon
African Championships
Silver medal – second place	1996 Yaoundé	Heptathlon

Anne-Marie Mouri-Nkeng (born 30 November 1975) is a Cameroonian sprinter. She competed in the women's 4 × 100 metres relay at the 2000 Summer Olympics.

Anne-Marie stayed in Australia post the 2000 Sydney Olympics, residing in Adelaide. On 28 December 2021, Mouri-Nkeng ran 2nd in the prestigious Bay Sheffield 120m Women's final behind Lauren Hewitt before heading over to Tasmania on New Year's Day where she was victorious in the 2002 120m Women's Burnie Gift, becoming the first international & first South Australian based athlete to win the event.
