= Marcia Richardson =

British athlete (born 1972)

Marcia Bailey née Richardson
Personal information
- Nationality: British (English)
- Born: 10 February 1972 (age 54) Slough, England
- Height: 171 cm (5 ft 7 in)
- Weight: 62 kg (137 lb)

Sport
- Sport: Athletics
- Event: Sprints
- Club: Windsor, Slough & Eton AC
Medal record
Athletics
Representing England
Commonwealth Games
Bronze medal – third place	1998 Kuala Lumpur	4x100m relay

Marcia Maureen Bailey née Richardson (born 10 February 1972) is a female retired athlete from England, who specialised in the sprinting events and competed at two Olympic Games.

== Biography ==
Richardson represented Great Britain at two consecutive Summer Olympics, starting in 1996, as well as four World Championships. She represented England in the 100 and 200 metres and won a bronze medal in the 4 x 100 metres relay event, at the 1998 Commonwealth Games in Kuala Lumpur, Malaysia.

Richardson became the British 100 metres champion after winning the British AAA Championships title at the 2000 AAA Championships, whch qualified her to compete at the 2000 Olympic Games.

At the 2000 Olympic Games in Sydney, Richardson represented Great Britain in the 100 metres and 4 x 100 metres relay events.

== Competition record ==
Year	Competition	Venue	Position	Event	Notes
Representing Great Britain and England
1991	European Junior Championships	Thessaloniki, Greece	2nd	100 m	11.62
1991	European Junior Championships	Thessaloniki, Greece	2nd	4 × 100 m relay	44.57
1993	World Indoor Championships	Toronto, Canada	14th (sf)	60 m	7.41
1993	World Indoor Championships	Toronto, Canada	16th (h)	200 m	24.50
1993	Universiade	Buffalo, United States	6th	100 m	11.69
1993	World Championships	Stuttgart, Germany	8th	4 × 100 m relay	43.86
1994	European Indoor Championships	Paris, France	10th (sf)	200 m	23.95
1994	European Championships	Helsinki, Finland	23rd (qf)	100 m	11.71
1995	World Championships	Gothenburg, Sweden	9th (h)	4 × 100 m relay	43.90
1995	Universiade	Fukuoka, Japan	6th	100 m	11.60
1995	Universiade	Fukuoka, Japan	6th	4 × 100 m relay	44.93
1996	Olympic Games	Atlanta, United States	26th (qf)	100 m	11.55
1996	Olympic Games	Atlanta, United States	8th	4 × 100 m relay	43.93
1997	World Indoor Championships	Paris, France	12th (sf)	60 m	7.30
1997	World Championships	Athens, Greece	40th (h)	100 m	11.65
1998	Commonwealth Games	Kuala Lumpur, Malaysia	9th (sf)	100 m	11.47
1998	Commonwealth Games	Kuala Lumpur, Malaysia	12th (sf)	200 m	23.82
1998	Commonwealth Games	Kuala Lumpur, Malaysia	3rd	4 × 100 m relay	43.69
1999	World Championships	Seville, Spain	8th	4 × 100 m relay	43.52
2000	European Indoor Championships	Ghent, Belgium	8th	60 m	7.27
2000	Olympic Games	Sydney, Australia	41st (qf)	100 m	11.62
2000	Olympic Games	Sydney, Australia	9th (sf)	4 × 100 m relay	43.19
2001	World Championships	Edmonton, Canada	26th (qf)	100 m	11.59
2001	World Championships	Edmonton, Canada	5th	4 × 100 m relay	42.60

== Personal bests ==
Outdoor

- 100 metres – 11.35 (+2.0 m/s) (Bedford 2000)
- 200 metres – 23.72 (-0.9 m/s) (Sheffield 1997)

Indoor

- 60 metres – 7.24 (Birmingham 2000)
- 200 metres – 24.50 (Toronto 1993)
