= Elly Hutton =

Australian sprinter

Personal information
- Born: 2 June 1976 (age 49) Melbourne, Victoria, Australia
- Height: 163 cm (5 ft 4 in)
- Weight: 58 kg (128 lb)

Sport
- Country: Australia
- Sport: Sprinting
- Event: 4 × 100 metres relay

Elly Hutton (born 2 June 1976) is an Australian sprinter. She competed in the women's 4 × 100 metres relay at the 2000 Summer Olympics.
