= Benedicta Ajudua =

Nigerian sprinter

Benedicta Ajudua (born 10 July 1975) is a Nigerian sprinter who specializes in the 100 metres.

She finished seventh in 4 x 400 metres relay at the 2000 Summer Olympics with teammates Glory Alozie, Mercy Nku and Mary Onyali.
