= 2000 Asian Athletics Championships – Women's 4 × 100 metres relay =

The women's 4 × 100 metres relay event at the 2000 Asian Athletics Championships was held in Jakarta, Indonesia on 31 August.

== Results ==
Rank	Team	Name	Time	Notes
1st place, gold medalist(s)	Sri Lanka	Tamara Samandeepika, Pradeepa Herath, Nimmi de Zoysa, Damayanthi Dharsha	44.23	NR
2nd place, silver medalist(s)	India	Anuradha Biswal, Vinita Tripathi, Saraswati Dey, Rachita Mistry	44.48	
3rd place, bronze medalist(s)	China	Su Yiping, Chen Yuxiang, Yan Jiankui, Chen Jueqin	44.80	
4	Thailand	Trecia Roberts, Supavadee Khawpeak, Orranut Klomdee, Jutamass Tawoncharoen	45.14	
5	Japan	Yumiko Sugawara, Motoka Arai, Sakie Nobuoka, Kaori Sakagami	45.26	
6	Indonesia	Sih Hernawati, Irene Truitje Joseph, Raquel Perera Soselisa, Supiati	45.89	
