= Wirawan Ruamsuk =

Thai sprinter

Personal information
- Nationality: Thai
- Born: 11 March 1980 (age 45)

Sport
- Sport: Sprinting
- Event: 4 × 100 metres relay

Wirawan Ruamsuk (born 11 March 1980) is a Thai sprinter. She competed in the women's 4 × 100 metres relay at the 2000 Summer Olympics.
