= Monica Rahanitraniriana =

Malagasy sprinter

Personal information
- Born: 13 September 1970 (age 55) Madagascar
- Height: 165 cm (5 ft 5 in)

Sport
- Sport: Sprinting

Achievements and titles
- Personal best: 11.60
Medal record
Women's athletics
Representing Madagascar
African Championships
Bronze medal – third place	1992 Belle Vue Harel	4×100 m

Monica Rahanitraniriana (born 13 September 1970) is a Malagasy sprinter.

She competed in the 100 metres at the 1988 World Junior Championships without reaching the final. Her first relay success came at the 1992 African Championships, when she won a bronze medal with the Malagasy team. She followed this up with another relay bronze at the 1994 Jeux de la Francophonie.

At the 1997 Jeux de la Francophonie she finished sixth in the 400 metres and won a bronze medal in the 4 × 100 metres relay. The Malagasy team with Rahanitraniriana as a member was also able to compete in the Women's 4 × 100 metres relay at the 2000 Summer Olympics. Her team's time in the qualifiers was 43.61, followed by 43.98 in the semifinals. At the 2001 Jeux de la Francophonie Rahanitraniriana won yet another relay bronze.

She also won the 400 metres event at the 2003 Indian Ocean Games.
