= Sylviane Félix =

French sprinter (born 1977)

Medal record

Women's Athletics

Representing France

Olympic Games
Bronze medal – third place	2004 Athens	4 × 100 m relay

World Championships
Gold medal – first place	2003 Paris	4 × 100 m relay
Silver medal – second place	2001 Edmonton	4 × 100 m relay
Bronze medal – third place	1997 Athens	4 × 100 m relay

European Championships
Gold medal – first place	1998 Budapest	4 × 100 m relay
Gold medal – first place	2002 Munich	4 × 100 m relay

Mediterranean Games
Gold medal – first place	1997 Bari	4 × 100 m relay
Gold medal – first place	2001 Tunis	4 × 100 m relay
Silver medal – second place	2005 Almería	100 m
Bronze medal – third place	1997 Bari	100 m

European Junior Championships
Bronze medal – third place	1995 Nyiregyhaza	200 m

World Junior Championships
Gold medal – first place	1996 Sydney	200 m

Sylviane Felix (born 31 October 1977 in Créteil, France) is a track and field sprint athlete, competing internationally for France, who won the bronze medal in the 4 × 100 m relay at the 2004 Olympic Games in Athens, Greece.

Felix started running at age fifteen. She suffered knee and back injuries which forced her out of competition for two years between 1998 and 2000. She did not know anything about athletics and was not particularly interested in it but she won her first race. "The sensations were extraordinary so I continued with it." Her best senior solo result was finishing 4th in the 200 m final at the 2002 European Athletics Championships in Munich.

Felix was the 1996 world junior 200 m champion. Her occupation is police officer. She is a graduated sociologist. She finished 5th in the 200 m final and 7th in the 100 m final at the 2006 European Athletics Championships in Gothenburg.

== Personal Bests ==
- 100 m: 11.15 s
- 200 m: 22.56 s
- French Record Holder in 4 × 100 m Relay in 2003, time: 41.78 s
