= Tamara Samandeepika =

Sri Lankan sprinter

Personal information
- Nationality: Sri Lankan
- Born: 4 July 1974 (age 51)

Sport
- Sport: Sprinting
- Event: 4 × 100 metres relay
Medal record
Women's athletics
Representing Sri Lanka
Asian Championships
Gold medal – first place	2000 Jakarta	4×100 m

Tamara Samandeepika (born 4 July 1974) is a Sri Lankan sprinter. She competed in the women's 4 × 100 metres relay at the 2000 Summer Olympics.
