= Joanna Niełacna =

Polish sprinter

Personal information
- Nationality: Polish
- Born: 16 October 1973 (age 52)

Sport
- Sport: Sprinting
- Event: 4 × 100 metres relay

Joanna Niełacna (born 16 October 1973) is a Polish sprinter. She competed in the women's 4 × 100 metres relay at the 2000 Summer Olympics.
