= Valdivel Jayalakshmi =

Indian sprinter (born 1971)

Personal information
- Nationality: Indian
- Born: 5 August 1971 (age 54)

Sport
- Sport: Sprinting
- Event: 4 × 100 metres relay

Valdivel Jayalakshmi (born 5 August 1971) is an Indian sprinter. She represented India in 4 x 100 metres relay together with P. T. Usha, Rachita Mistry, and E.B. Shyla at the 1998 Asian Championships in Athletics, where her team won the gold medal on the way to setting the current national record of 44.43 s.

She also competed in the women's 4 × 100 metres relay at the 2000 Summer Olympics.
