= Juliet Campbell (sprinter) =

Jamaican sprinter (born 1970)

Personal information
- Born: 17 March 1970 (age 56) Kingston, Jamaica

Sport
- Sport: Track and field
Medal record
Representing Jamaica
World Championships
Bronze medal – third place	1993 Stuttgart	4x100m relay
Bronze medal – third place	2001 Edmonton	4x100m relay
World Indoor Championships
Gold medal – first place	2001 Lisbon	200m
Silver medal – second place	2001 Lisbon	4x400m relay
Bronze medal – third place	2003 Birmingham	200m
Commonwealth Games
Silver medal – second place	1998 Kuala Lumpur	200m
Silver medal – second place	2002 Manchester	200m
Silver medal – second place	1998 Kuala Lumpur	4x100m relay
Silver medal – second place	2002 Manchester	4x100m relay
Central American and Caribbean Games
Silver medal – second place	1998 Maracaibo	4x100m relay

Juliet Jean Campbell (born 17 March 1970) is a retired Jamaican sprinter, who specialized in the 200 and 400 metres. She also competed on the successful Jamaican team in both 4 × 100 m and 4 × 400 m relay.

Campbell attended St. Jago High School. She was initially a high jumper but was 'tricked' into running the 400 metres. Campbell competed for the Auburn Tigers track and field team in the NCAA.

After retirement from sprinting, she became a sports marketing manager for Puma.

== Achievements ==
Year	Competition	Venue	Position	Event	Notes
Representing Jamaica
1987	CARIFTA Games (U20)	Port of Spain, Trinidad and Tobago	1st	400 m	53.36
1989	CARIFTA Games (U20)	Bridgetown, Barbados	2nd	400 m	54.4
1990	Goodwill Games	Seattle, United States	3rd	4 × 100 m	44.12
1990	Goodwill Games	Seattle, United States	4th	4 × 400 m	3:33.11
1992	Olympic Games	Barcelona, Spain	18th (qf)	400 m	52.12
1992	Olympic Games	Barcelona, Spain	5th	4 × 400 m	3:25.68
1993	World Championships	Stuttgart, Germany	7th	400 m	51.40
1993	World Championships	Stuttgart, Germany	3rd	4 × 100 m	41.94
1993	World Championships	Stuttgart, Germany	4th	4 × 400 m	3:23.83
1996	Olympic Games	Atlanta, United States	16th (sf)	400 m	51.65
1996	Olympic Games	Atlanta, United States	4th	4 × 400 m	3:21.69
1997	World Championships	Athens, Greece	12th (sf)	200 m	22.94
1998	Central American and Caribbean Games	Maracaibo, Venezuela	2nd	200 m	22.63
1998	Commonwealth Games	Kuala Lumpur, Malaysia	2nd	200 m	22.79
1998	Commonwealth Games	Kuala Lumpur, Malaysia	2nd	4 × 100 m relay	43.49
1999	World Indoor Championships	Maebashi, Japan	5th	200 m	23.11
1999	World Championships	Seville, Spain	8th	200 m	22.64
2000	Olympic Games	Sydney, Australia	26th (qf)	200 m	23.34
2001	World Indoor Championships	Lisbon, Portugal	1st	200 m	22.64
2001	World Indoor Championships	Lisbon, Portugal	2nd	4 × 400 m relay	3:30.79
2001	World Championships	Edmonton, Canada	4th	200 m	22.99
2001	World Championships	Edmonton, Canada	3rd	4 × 100 m relay	42.40
2001	Goodwill Games	Brisbane, Australia	2nd	200 m	23.17
2001	Goodwill Games	Brisbane, Australia	3rd	4 × 100 m	43.13
2002	Commonwealth Games	Manchester, United Kingdom	2nd	200 m	22.54
2002	Commonwealth Games	Manchester, United Kingdom	2nd	4 × 100 m	42.73
2003	World Indoor Championships	Birmingham, United Kingdom	3rd	200 m	22.81
2004	World Indoor Championships	Budapest, Hungary	7th (h)	200 m	23.51

=== Personal bests ===
- 200 metres - 22.50 s (1999)
- 400 metres - 50.11 s (1996)
