= Elvira Pančić =

Serbian sprinter

Personal information
- Nationality: Serbian
- Born: 14 May 1980 (age 45)

Sport
- Sport: Sprinting
- Event: 4 × 100 metres relay

Elvira Pančić (born 14 May 1980) is a Serbian sprinter. She competed in the women's 4 × 100 metres relay at the 2000 Summer Olympics representing Yugoslavia.
