= Agnieszka Rysiukiewicz =

Polish sprinter

Personal information
- Born: 3 January 1978 (age 48) Świebodzin, Poland
- Height: 171 cm (5 ft 7 in)
- Weight: 60 kg (132 lb)

Sport
- Sport: Sprinting
- Event: 4 × 100 metres relay
- Club: AZS AWF Wrocław
Medal record
Representing Poland
Summer Universiade
Silver medal – second place	1999 Palma de Mallorca	4x100m relay
European U23 Championships
Bronze medal – third place	1999 Gothenburg	4x100m relay

Agnieszka Rysiukiewicz (born 3 January 1978) is a Polish sprinter. She competed in the women's 4 × 100 metres relay at the 2000 Summer Olympics. Her brother Piotr Rysiukiewicz is also a sprinter.
