= Esther Mvondo =

Cameroonian sprinter (born 1975)

Personal information
- Nationality: Cameroonian
- Born: 29 August 1975 (age 50)

Sport
- Sport: Sprinting
- Event: 4 × 100 metres relay

Esther Mvondo (born 29 August 1975) is a Cameroonian sprinter. She competed in the women's 4 × 100 metres relay at the 2000 Summer Olympics.
