= Elena Kviatkovskaya =

Uzbekistani sprinter (born 1965)

Personal information
- Nationality: Uzbekistani
- Born: 12 October 1965 (age 60)

Sport
- Sport: Sprinting
- Event: 4 × 100 metres relay

Elena Kviatkovskaya (born 12 October 1965) is an Uzbekistani sprinter. She competed in the women's 4 × 100 metres relay at the 2000 Summer Olympics.
