= Carine Eyenga =

Cameroonian sprinter

Personal information
- Full name: Carine Eyenga Abani
- Nationality: Cameroonian
- Born: 14 February 1983 (age 42)

Sport
- Sport: Sprinting
- Event: 4 × 100 metres relay

Carine Eyenga Abani (born 14 February 1983) is a Cameroonian sprinter. She competed in the women's 4 × 100 metres relay at the 2000 Summer Olympics.
