= Atia Weekes =

Canadian sprinter

Personal information
- Born: 29 May 1980 (age 45) Montreal, Quebec, Canada

Sport
- Sport: Sprinting
- Event: 4 × 100 metres relay

Atia Weekes (born 29 May 1980) is a Canadian sprinter. She competed in the women's 4 × 100 metres relay at the 2000 Summer Olympics.
