= Savatheda Fynes =

Bahamian sprinter

Personal information
- Born: October 17, 1974 (age 51) Abaco Islands, Bahamas

Sport
- Sport: Track and field
Medal record
Women's athletics
Representing Bahamas
Olympic Games
Gold medal – first place	2000 Sydney	4 × 100 m relay
Silver medal – second place	1996 Atlanta	4 × 100 m relay
World Championships
Gold medal – first place	1999 Seville	4 × 100 m relay
Bronze medal – third place	1997 Athens	100 m
Commonwealth Games
Gold medal – first place	2002 Manchester	4 × 100 m relay
Bronze medal – third place	2002 Manchester	100 m
CAC Junior Championships (U20)
Gold medal – first place	1992 Tegucigalpa	200 m
Silver medal – second place	1992 Tegucigalpa	100 m
CAC Junior Championships (U17)
Gold medal – first place	1990 Havana	4 × 400 m relay
Silver medal – second place	1990 Havana	100 m
Silver medal – second place	1990 Havana	200 m
Bronze medal – third place	1990 Havana	4 × 100 m relay
CARIFTA Games Junior (U20)
Gold medal – first place	1992 Nassau	200 m
Silver medal – second place	1991 Port of Spain	100 m
Silver medal – second place	1992 Nassau	100 m
Silver medal – second place	1992 Nassau	4 × 100 m relay
Silver medal – second place	1992 Nassau	4 × 400 m relay
Silver medal – second place	1993 Fort-de-France	100 m
Silver medal – second place	1993 Fort-de-France	4 × 100 m relay
Silver medal – second place	1993 Fort-de-France	4 × 400 m relay
Bronze medal – third place	1993 Fort-de-France	200 m
CARIFTA Games Youth (U17)
Bronze medal – third place	1990 Kingston	100 m

Savatheda Fynes (born October 17, 1974) is a track and field sprint athlete, competing internationally for Bahamas. She is an Olympic gold medalist in the 4 x 100 meter relay race. Some sources spell her first name "Sevatheda".

== Career ==
She graduated Physiology and Exercise Science at Michigan State University, East Lansing, Michigan, USA. She missed the 2001 World Championships due to injury. She had a minor car accident prior to the 2000 Olympic trials, which limited her training. At the World Championships in 1999 she was eliminated in semifinals due to an injured hip flexor. In 1996 a hamstring injury kept her out of the 100 m at the Atlanta Games.

She was a member of the Bahamas 4 × 100 m relay team that won gold at the 1999 World Championships. After that performance the team of Fynes, Pauline Davis-Thompson, Debbie Ferguson, Chandra Sturrup and Eldece Clark-Lewis were dubbed the Golden Girls. When they won the relay again at the Sydney Olympics they showed the world why they had earned that name. The girls returned home from Sydney to a six-day fanfare of festivities in their honor, from receptions and parades to monetary awards and land grants. Central Bank has even been commissioned to mint a commemorative gold coin to honour their victory.

She earned an athletic scholarship to Southern University at New Orleans, but later transferred to Eastern Michigan University and then to Michigan State University.

She was forced to sit out the 1996 season because she was a transfer. She attended an indoor meet that year and stayed in a hotel room paid for by Michigan State. That being a violation, she lost her final season of eligibility in 1998, and her coach lost her job.

== Coaching career ==
In 2010, Fynes Coke worked as an assistant coach for the NJIT Highlanders track and field team.

== Personal bests ==
- 100 metres: 10.91 seconds in Lausanne 1999
- 60 metres: 7.01 seconds in Maebashi 1999
- 50 metres: 6.05 seconds in Liévin 2000

== Achievements ==
Year	Competition	Venue	Position	Event	Notes
Representing the Bahamas
1990	CARIFTA Games (U-17)	Kingston, Jamaica	3rd	100 m	12.20 (1.9 m/s)
1990	Central American and Caribbean Junior Championships (U-17)	Havana, Cuba	2nd	100 m	12.13 (0.2 m/s)
1990	Central American and Caribbean Junior Championships (U-17)	Havana, Cuba	2nd	200 m	24.68 (0.2 m/s)
1990	Central American and Caribbean Junior Championships (U-17)	Havana, Cuba	3rd	4 × 100 m relay	47.66
1990	Central American and Caribbean Junior Championships (U-17)	Havana, Cuba	1st	4 × 400 m relay	3:47.22
1991	CARIFTA Games (U-20)	Port of Spain, Trinidad and Tobago	2nd	100 m	11.64 (1.7 m/s)
1992	CARIFTA Games (U-20)	Nassau, Bahamas	2nd	100 m	11.52 w (4.7 m/s)
1992	CARIFTA Games (U-20)	Nassau, Bahamas	1st	200 m	23.49 w (3.1 m/s)
1992	CARIFTA Games (U-20)	Nassau, Bahamas	2nd	4 × 100 m relay	45.61
1992	CARIFTA Games (U-20)	Nassau, Bahamas	2nd	4 × 400 m relay	3:42.37
1992	Central American and Caribbean Junior Championships (U-20)	Tegucigalpa, Honduras	2nd	100 m	12.1 (0.0 m/s)
1992	Central American and Caribbean Junior Championships (U-20)	Tegucigalpa, Honduras	1st	200 m	24.1 (-0.1 m/s)
1993	CARIFTA Games (U-20)	Fort-de-France, Martinique	2nd	100 m	11.52 (0.3 m/s)
1993	CARIFTA Games (U-20)	Fort-de-France, Martinique	3rd	200 m	23.81 (-1.2 m/s)
1993	CARIFTA Games (U-20)	Fort-de-France, Martinique	2nd	4 × 100 m relay	45.53
1993	CARIFTA Games (U-20)	Fort-de-France, Martinique	2nd	4 × 400 m relay	3:39.32
1993	Central American and Caribbean Championships	Cali, Colombia	2nd	4 × 100 m relay	44.28
1995	World Championships	Gothenburg, Sweden	6th (qf)	100 m	11.36 (0.8 m/s)
1995	World Championships	Gothenburg, Sweden	5th (h)	200 m	23.01 (-0.5 m/s)
1995	World Championships	Gothenburg, Sweden	4th	4 × 100 m relay	43.14
1996	Olympic Games	Atlanta, United States	6th (qf)	200 m	23.26 (0.3 m/s)
1996	Olympic Games	Atlanta, United States	2nd	4 × 100 m relay	42.14
1997	World Championships	Athens, Greece	3rd	100 m	11.03 (0.4 m/s)
1997	World Championships	Athens, Greece	6th	4 × 100 m relay	42.77
1999	World Championships	Seville, Spain	6th (sf)	100 m	11.15 (-0.1 m/s)
1999	World Championships	Seville, Spain	1st	4 × 100 m relay	41.92 WL
2000	Olympic Games	Sydney, Australia	7th	100 m	11.22 (-0.4 m/s)
2000	Olympic Games	Sydney, Australia	1st	4 × 100 m relay	41.95 SB
2003	World Championships	Paris, France	6th (qf)	100 m	11.36 (0.0 m/s)
2003	World Championships	Paris, France	3rd (h)	4 × 100 m relay	43.64
2006	Central American and Caribbean Games	Cartagena, Colombia	14th (h)	100 m	11.75 (+2.3 m/s)
