= Pradeepa Herath =

Sri Lankan sprinter (born 1976)

Personal information
- Full name: Shamani Pradeepa Kumari Kiwuldeniye Herath Mudiyanselage
- Nationality: Sri Lankan
- Born: 27 June 1976 (age 50)
- Height: 176 cm (5 ft 9 in)
- Weight: 60 kg (132 lb)

Sport
- Sport: Sprinting
- Event: 4 × 100 metres relay
Medal record
Women's athletics
Representing Sri Lanka
Asian Championships
Gold medal – first place	2000 Jakarta	4×100 m

Shamani Pradeepa Kumari Kiwuldeniye Herath Mudiyanselage (born 27 June 1976) is a Sri Lankan former sprinter. She competed in the women's 4 × 100 metres relay at the 2000 Summer Olympics.
