= Savitree Srichure =

Thai sprinter

Personal information
- Nationality: Thai
- Born: 11 August 1975 (age 50)

Sport
- Sport: Sprinting
- Event: 4 × 100 metres relay
Medal record
Women's athletics
Representing Thailand
Asian Championships
Bronze medal – third place	1998 Fukuoka	4×100 m

Savitree Srichure (born 11 August 1975) is a Thai sprinter. She competed in the women's 4 × 100 metres relay at the 1996 Summer Olympics.
