= Iryna Pukha =

Ukrainian sprinter

Personal information
- Born: 10 January 1973 (age 53)

Sport
- Sport: Track and field
Medal record
Representing Ukraine
European Indoor Championships
Bronze medal – third place	2000 Ghent	60 metres
European Cup
Bronze medal – third place	1996 Madrid	100 m

Iryna Pukha (Ukrainian: Ірина Пуха, born 10 January 1973) is a retired Ukrainian sprinter who specialized in the 100 metres.

She won a bronze medal in the 60 metres at the 2000 European Indoor Championships. She also competed at the 1995 World Indoor Championships and the 2001 World Indoor Championships without reaching the final.

In the 100 metres she finished fourth at the 1992 World Junior Championships. She participated at the 1996 Olympic Games, the 1997 World Championships, the 1998 European Championships and the 2000 Olympic Games without reaching the final.

In the 4 x 100 metres relay she finished fourth at the 1998 European Championships. She also competed at the 1999 World Championships and the 2000 Olympic Games without reaching the final. At the 1997 World Championships the relay team was disqualified.

Her personal best times are 7.11 seconds in the 60 metres, achieved at the 2000 European Indoor Championships in Ghent, and 11.12 seconds in the 100 metres, achieved in June 2000 in Chania.
