= Marzena Pawlak =

Polish sprinter

Personal information
- Nationality: Polish
- Born: 26 May 1971 (age 54)

Sport
- Sport: Sprinting
- Event: 4 × 100 metres relay

Marzena Pawlak (born 26 May 1971) is a Polish sprinter. She competed in the women's 4 × 100 metres relay at the 2000 Summer Olympics.
