= Saša Prokofjev =

Slovenian sprinter

Personal information
- Nationality: Slovenian
- Born: 28 November 1971 (age 53)

Sport
- Sport: Sprinting
- Event: 4 × 400 metres relay

Saša Prokofjev (born 28 November 1971) is a Slovenian sprinter. She competed in the women's 4 × 400 metres relay at the 2000 Summer Olympics.
