= Tayna Lawrence =

Athletics competitor

Personal information
- Born: 17 September 1975 (age 51) Spanish Town, Jamaica
Medal record
Women's athletics
Representing Jamaica
Olympic Games
Gold medal – first place	2004 Athens	4 × 100 m relay
Silver medal – second place	2000 Sydney	4 × 100 m relay
Silver medal – second place	2000 Sydney	100 metres

Tayna Lawrence (born 17 September 1975 in Spanish Town, Jamaica) is a retired Track and field sprint athlete who competed internationally for Jamaica. She is an Olympic gold medalist in the 4 × 100 meter relay race.

Lawrence graduated from Florida International University, in Miami, Florida, US. She sustained a leg injury and had to undergo surgery in 2003, missing the World Championships in Paris. She was severely hampered by a series of stress fractures in 2001, which ruled her out of the World Championships.

== Personal bests ==
Date	Event	Venue	Time
30 August 2002	100 m	Brussels, Belgium	10.93
1 May 2000	200 m	Pointe-á-Pitre, France	22.84

* Marion Jones, the American athlete who finished in first place, was stripped of her gold medal in October 2007 following a doping scandal. Ekaterini Thanou, the Greek athlete who finished second place, was later suspended for two years following various scandals at the 2004 Summer Olympics.

== Videos ==
- Flotrack Videos of Tayna Lawrence
