= Inger Miller =

American sprinter

Personal information
- Born: June 12, 1972 (age 54) Los Angeles, California, U.S.
- Height: 1.63 m (5 ft 4 in)
- Weight: 55 kg (121 lb)
Medal record
Women's athletics
Representing the United States
Olympic Games
| Gold medal – first place | 1996 Atlanta | 4 × 100 m relay |
World Championships
| Gold medal – first place | 1997 Athens | 4 × 100 m relay |
| Gold medal – first place | 1999 Seville | 200 m |
| Silver medal – second place | 1999 Seville | 100 m |
| Silver medal – second place | 2003 Paris | 4 × 100 m relay |
| Disqualified | 2001 Edmonton | 4 × 100 m relay |
Summer Universiade
| Gold medal – first place | 1995 Fukuoka | 4 x 100 m relay |

Official 1996 Olympic Film, Inger Miller segment @ 1:20:10

Inger Miller (born June 12, 1972) is an American retired track and field sprinter who competed in the 100 metres and 200 m. She is the daughter of Lennox Miller, an Olympic double 100 m medallist from Jamaica.

== Career ==
She attended John Muir High School in Pasadena, California and later the University of Southern California. Miller was a Tournament of Roses Princess in the 1990 court. During her professional career she was a member of HSI.

She originally won the bronze medal in the 60 meters at the 1999 IAAF World Indoor Championships, but she tested positive for excessive caffeine after the race. Her results from the tournament were nullified and she received a public warning.

She was 1999 World 200 m champion; 1999 World Champs 100 m silver medalist; 1996 Olympic 4 × 100 m relay gold medalist; 4 × 100 m relay gold medalist at 1997 World Champs; 2003 World Outdoor 4 × 100 m silver medalist.

Together with Jill Hawkins, Miller started Miller-Hawkins Productions, a full-service event coordinating company. The company currently operates out of offices in Altadena.

As of 2019 Miller was working as a flight attendant.

Sporting positions
| Preceded by (United States) Marion Jones | Women's 200 m Best Year Performance; 1999 | Succeeded by (United States) Marion Jones |
