= Marion Wagner =

German sprinter (born 1978)

- 4 × 100 m women's team_Germany Berlin_2009.jpg; Marion Wagner (first from left) as part of the German 4 × 100 m women's team during the 2009 World Championships in Athletics in Berlin, Germany

Medal record

Women's athletics

Representing Germany

World Championships
Gold medal – first place	2001 Edmonton	4 × 100 m relay
Bronze medal – third place	2009 Berlin	4 × 100 m relay

European Championships
Silver medal – second place	2002 Munich	4 × 100 m relay

Marion Wagner (born 1 February 1978, in Mainz) is a retired German sprinter who specialized in the 100 metres. Her personal best time is 11.24 seconds, which was achieved in July 2009 at the German Championships in Ulm. She represents the sports club USC Mainz.

Wagner represented Germany at the 2008 Summer Olympics in Beijing. She competed in the 4 × 100 metres relay together with Anne Möllinger, Cathleen Tschirch and Verena Sailer. In their first round heat they placed third behind Jamaica and Russia and in front of China. Their time of 43.59 seconds was the eighth time overall out of sixteen participating nations. With this result they qualified for the final in which they sprinted to a time of 43.28 seconds, which was the fifth place. She was an unused reserve for the German 4 × 100 m team at the 2012 Summer Olympics.

== Achievements ==
Year	Competition	Venue	Position	Event	Notes
Representing Germany
1994	World Junior Championships	Lisbon, Portugal	26th (qf)	200 m	24.70 (wind: +0.4 m/s)
1995	European Junior Championships	Nyíregyháza, Hungary	1st	4 × 100 m relay	44.77
1996	World Junior Championships	Sydney, Australia	13th (sf)	100 m	11.83
1996	World Junior Championships	Sydney, Australia	3rd	4 × 100 m relay	44.57
1997	European Junior Championships	Ljubljana, Slovenia	1st	4 × 100 m relay	44.24
1999	European U23 Championships	Gothenburg, Sweden	4th	100 m	11.48 (wind: -0.2 m/s)
1999	European U23 Championships	Gothenburg, Sweden	2nd	4 × 100 m relay	43.53
1999	World Championships	Seville, Spain	5th	4 × 100 m relay	42.63
2000	Olympic Games	Sydney, Australia	6th	4 × 100 m relay	43.11
2001	World Championships	Edmonton, Canada	1st	4 × 100 m relay	42.32
2002	European Indoor Championships	Vienna, Austria	5th	60 m	7.23
2002	European Championships	Munich, Germany	2nd	4 × 100 m relay	42.54
2003	World Championships	Paris, France	5th	4 × 100 m relay	43.27
2005	European Indoor Championships	Madrid, Spain	6th	60 m	7.32
2008	Summer Olympics	Beijing, China	5th	4 × 100 m relay	43.28
2009	World Championships	Berlin, Germany	3rd	4 × 100 m relay	42.87
