= Marie Gnahoré =

Ivorian sprinter

Personal information
- Nationality: Ivorian
- Born: 9 November 1976 (age 48)

Sport
- Sport: Sprinting
- Event: 4 × 100 metres relay

Marie Gnahoré (born 9 November 1976) is an Ivorian sprinter. She competed in the women's 4 × 100 metres relay at the 2000 Summer Olympics.
