= Vida Nsiah =

Ghanaian track and field athlete

Personal information
- Nationality: Ghanaian
- Born: April 13, 1976 (age 50)
- Height: 1.72 m (5.6 ft)
- Weight: 65 kg (143 lb)

Sport
- Country: Ghana
- Sport: Track and Field
- Events: 100m, 200m, 4x100m 100 m hurdles

Achievements and titles
- Regional finals: 1998 100m — 5th 1998 200m — 6th
- Personal bests: 100m: 11.18 sec 200m: 22.8 sec 100m hurdles: 13.02 sec
Medal record
Women's athletics
Representing Ghana
African Championships
Bronze medal – third place	1998 Dakar	4×100 m

Vida Nsiah (born 13 April 1976) is a retired female track and field sprinter and hurdler from Ghana. At the 1998 Commonwealth Games in Kuala Lumpur she finished fifth in the 100 metres and sixth in the 200 metres.

Together with Mavis Akoto, Monica Twum and Vida Anim she holds the Ghanaian record in 4 x 100 metres relay with 43.19 seconds, achieved during the heats at the 2000 Summer Olympics in Sydney.

== Personal bests ==
- 100 metres - 11.18 s (2000) - former national record.
- 200 metres - 22.80 s (1997) - national record.
- 100 metres hurdles - 13.02 s (2001) - national record.
