= Mavis Akoto =

Ghanaian sprinter (born 1978)

Personal information
- Nationality: Ghanaian
- Born: 22 March 1978 (age 48)

Sport
- Sport: Sprinting
- Event: 4 × 100 Metres Relay
Medal record
Women's athletics
Representing Ghana
African Championships
Bronze medal – third place	1998 Dakar	4×100 m

Mavis Akoto (born 22 March 1978) is a Ghanaian sprinter who competed in the Women's 4 × 100 Metres Relay at the 2000 Summer Olympics.
