= Anzhela Kravchenko =

Ukrainian sprinter

Personal information
- Born: 25 January 1971 (age 55)
- Height: 1.65 m (5 ft 5 in)
- Weight: 59 kg (130 lb)

Sport
- Sport: Track and field
Medal record
Representing Ukraine
Goodwill Games
Bronze medal – third place	1994 Saint Petersburg	4 x 100 metres
Summer Universiade
Silver medal – second place	1997 Catania	100 m

Anzhela Kravchenko (Ukrainian: Анжела Кравченко, born 25 January 1971) is a retired Ukrainian sprinter. She specialized in the 100 metres and 200 metres.

== Career ==
In the 100 metres she won a silver medal at the 1997 Summer Universiade and finished seventh at the 1998 European Championships. She also competed at the 1994 European Championships, the 1997 World Championships, the 2000 Olympic Games and the 2002 European Championships without reaching the final. In the 200 metres she finished seventh at the 2003 World Championships. In the 60 metres she competed at the 1997 World Indoor Championships and the 2001 World Indoor Championships without reaching the final.

In the 4 x 100 metres relay she finished fourth at the 1998 European Championships, fifth at the 2002 European Championships, and fourth at the 2003 World Championships. At the 1994 European Athletics Championships she ran in the heats, but not for the Ukrainian team in the final. The relay team was disqualified at the 1997 World Championships. She also competed at the 1999 World Championships and the 2000 Olympic Games without reaching the final.

Kravchenko also won eight national titles in Ukraine. She became 100 metres champion in 1997, 1998, 1999, 2000, 2001 and 2002; and 200 metres champion in 1997 and 2002. In comparison, double world champion Zhanna Pintusevich-Block only has two Ukrainian national titles.

Her personal best times are 7.07 seconds in the 60 metres (indoor), achieved in February 2000 in Erfurt; 11.16 seconds in the 100 metres, achieved at the 1998 European Championships in Budapest; and 22.66 seconds in the 200 metres, achieved at the 2003 World Championships in Paris. She co-holds the Ukrainian record in the 4 x 100 metres relay.

Kravchenko stood 1.65 m (5 ft 5 in) tall and weighed 59–60 kg during her active career.
