= Irina Khabarova =

Russian sprinter

Medal record

Women's athletics

Representing Russia

Olympic Games
Silver medal – second place	2004 Athens	4 × 100 m relay

European Championships
Gold medal – first place	2006 Gothenburg	4 × 100 m relay
Bronze medal – third place	2002 Munich	4 × 100 m relay
Bronze medal – third place	2006 Gothenburg	100 m

Irina Sergeyevna Khabarova (Russian: Ирина Серге́евна Хабарова; born March 18, 1966) is a Russian sprinter.

She won the silver medal in 4 × 100 metres relay at the 2004 Olympics and a bronze medal in the same event at both the 2002 and 2006 European Championships.

== Personal bests ==
- 100 metres – 11.18 (2006)
- 200 metres – 22.34 (2004)
