= Delphine Combe =

French sprinter

Medal record

Women's athletics

World Championships
Bronze medal – third place	1997 Athens	4 × 100 m relay

European Athletics Championships
Gold medal – first place	1998 Budapest	4 × 100 m relay – qualification
Gold medal – first place	2002 Munich	4 × 100 m relay

Delphine Combe (born 6 December 1974 in Aubenas, Ardèche) is a French sprinter. She won a bronze medal in 4 × 100 metres relay at the 1997 World Championships in Athletics and a gold medal in the same event at the 2002 European Championships in Athletics.

== Personal bests ==
- 100 metres – 11.35 (2002)
- 200 metres – 23.27 (2002)
