= Sandra Citte =

French athlete

Sandra Citte (born 28 March 1976 in Saint-Claude, Guadeloupe) is a French athlete who specialises in the 100 meters. Citte competed at the 1996 Summer Olympics and 2000 Summer Olympics
