= Marina Kislova =

Russian sprinter (born 1978)

Medal record

Women's athletics

Representing Russia

World Championships
Bronze medal – third place	2003 Paris	4x100 m relay

Marina Vladimirovna Kislova (Russian: Марина Владимировна Кислова; born 7 February 1978 in Leningrad) is a Russian sprinter.

== International competitions ==
Representing Russia
Year	Competition	Venue	Position	Event	Time	Notes
1999	European U23 Championships	Gothenburg, Sweden	8th	100 m	11.65	wind: -0.2 m/s
1999	European U23 Championships	Gothenburg, Sweden	9th (h)	200 m	23.73	wind: 0.9 m/s
2002	European Indoor Championships	Vienna, Austria	2nd	60 m	7.18	
2003	World Championships	Paris, France	3rd	4 × 100 m relay	42.66	

== Personal bests ==
- 100 metres - 11.09 (2001)
- 200 metres - 22.99 (2000)
