= Hanitriniaina Rakotondrabé =

Malagasy sprinter

Personal information
- Born: 1 January 1967 (age 59)

Sport
- Sport: Track and field
Medal record
Representing Madagascar
African Championships
Silver medal – second place	1993 Durban	4×100 m
Silver medal – second place	1998 Dakar	4×100 m
Bronze medal – third place	1992 Belle Vue Harel	4×100 m

Hanitriniaina Rivosoa Rakotondrabé (born 1 January 1967) is a retired Malagasy sprinter who specialized in the 100 meters.

She reached the semi-finals in the 60 metres at the World Indoor Championships in 1997 and 1999. She also competed at the World Championships in 1995, 1997 and 1999 as well as the 2000 Summer Olympics without progressing from the heats.

Rakotondrabé won the 100 m at the Antananarivo Francophone Games on 3 September 1997.

Her personal best time was 11.32 seconds, achieved in May 1996 in Dijon. This is the current Malagasy record, held jointly with Lalao Ravaonirina. She also co-holds the national record of 43.61 seconds in 4 x 100 metres relay, which was achieved at the 2000 Summer Olympics. She won the 100 meters at the 1998 and 2003 Indian Ocean Island Games.
