= Beverly McDonald =

Jamaican sprinter (born 1970)

Personal information
- Born: 15 February 1970 (age 56) Saint Mary, Jamaica

Sport
- Sport: Track and field
Medal record
Representing Jamaica
Olympic Games
Gold medal – first place	2004 Athens	4 × 100 m relay
Silver medal – second place	2000 Sydney	4 × 100 m relay
Bronze medal – third place	2000 Sydney	200 m
World Championships
Gold medal – first place	1991 Tokyo	4 × 100 m relay
Silver medal – second place	1995 Gothenburg	4 × 100 m relay
Silver medal – second place	1997 Athens	4 × 100 m relay
Silver medal – second place	1999 Seville	200 m
Silver medal – second place	2005 Helsinki	4 × 100 m relay
Bronze medal – third place	1999 Seville	4 × 100 m relay
Bronze medal – third place	2001 Edmonton	4 × 100 m relay
Pan American Games
Gold medal – first place	1991 Havana	4 × 100 m relay
Bronze medal – third place	1991 Havana	100 m

Beverly McDonald (born 15 February 1970) is a Jamaican sprinter. Her accomplishments include winning the silver medal in the 4 × 100 m relay at the 2000 Olympics and the gold medal in the same event at the 2004 Olympics. She also won the bronze medal at the 2000 Summer Olympics in the 200 m race, after Marion Jones was disqualified in 2007 due to doping violations, although it would take until the 2024 Summer Olympics for McDonald to be presented with the actual bronze medal.

McDonald first competed for the Barton Cougars track and field team in the NJCAA. She was an All-American sprinter for the TCU Horned Frogs track and field team, placing runner-up in the 100 m and 200 m at the 1993 NCAA Division I Outdoor Track and Field Championships.

Beverly McDonald is the sister of Michael McDonald.

== Personal bests ==
- 100 metres – 10.99 (1998)
- 200 metres – 22.22 (1999)

== Achievements ==
Year	Competition	Venue	Position	Event	Notes
Representing Jamaica
1985	CARIFTA Games (under-17)	Bridgetown, Barbados	1st	100 m	11.99
1985	CARIFTA Games (under-17)	Bridgetown, Barbados	2nd	200 m	24.22
1986	CARIFTA Games (under-17)	Les Abymes, Guadeloupe	1st	100 m	11.85
1986	CARIFTA Games (under-17)	Les Abymes, Guadeloupe	1st	200 m	23.90
1987	CARIFTA Games (under-20)	Port of Spain, Trinidad and Tobago	1st	100 m	11.54
1987	CARIFTA Games (under-20)	Port of Spain, Trinidad and Tobago	1st	200 m	23.40
1988	CARIFTA Games (under-20)	Kingston, Jamaica	2nd	100 m	11.62
1988	CARIFTA Games (under-20)	Kingston, Jamaica	1st	200 m	23.7
1988	World Junior Championships	Sudbury, Canada	7th	100 m	11.74 (wind: -0.4 m/s)
1988	World Junior Championships	Sudbury, Canada	6th	4 × 100 m relay	45.04
1991	World Championships	Tokyo, Japan	1st	4 × 100 m relay	41.94
1991	Pan American Games	Havana, Cuba	3rd	100 m	11.52
1991	Pan American Games	Havana, Cuba	1st	4 × 100 m relay	43.79
1995	World Championships	Gothenburg, Sweden	2nd	4 × 100 m relay	42.25
1997	World Championships	Athens, Greece	2nd	4 × 100 m relay	42.10
1998	Central American and Caribbean Games	Maracaibo, Venezuela	2nd	100 m	11.36
1998	Central American and Caribbean Games	Maracaibo, Venezuela	1st	200 m	22.30 w
1999	World Championships	Seville, Spain	2nd	200 m	22.22
1999	World Championships	Seville, Spain	3rd	4 × 100 m relay	42.15
1999	IAAF Grand Prix Final	Munich, Germany	3rd	200 m	22.64
2000	Summer Olympics	Sydney, Australia	3rd	200 m	22.35
2001	World Championships	Edmonton, Canada	3rd	4 × 100 m relay	42.40
