= Chioma Ajunwa =

Nigerian athlete (born 1970)

Chioma Ajunwa MON, OLY
Personal information
- Born: 25 December 1970 (age 55) Umuihiokwu, Nigeria
Medal record
Women's athletics
Representing Nigeria
Olympic Games
Gold medal – first place	1996 Atlanta	Long Jump
World Indoor Championships
Silver medal – second place	1997 Paris	Long Jump
African Championships
Gold medal – first place	1989 Lagos	Long jump
Gold medal – first place	1990 Cairo	4×100 m
Gold medal – first place	1990 Cairo	Long jump
Gold medal – first place	1998 Dakar	Long jump
Silver medal – second place	1990 Cairo	100 m
Commonwealth Games
Bronze medal – third place	1990 Auckland	4 × 100 m relay

chioma pronouncing

Chioma Ajunwa-Opara, née Chioma Ajunwa, (25 December 1970) is a Nigerian former track and field athlete and football player, notable for being the first Nigerian to win Olympic gold at the 1996 Summer Olympics in Atlanta, and the first black African woman to win an Olympic gold medal in a field event. A member of the Nigerian Police Force, Ajunwa remains the only woman to compete at both the FIFA Women's World Cup as a footballer and the Olympics as a track and field athlete.

In December 2017, Ajunwa launched the Chioma Ajunwa-Okpara Foundation to discover new Nigerian stars in sports. The Foundation, in collaboration with the Abia State government, sponsored an Under-16 Athletics Championship for Secondary Schools in March 2018.

== Early life ==
Born into what she describes as "a very poor home", Ahiazu-Mbaise-native Ajunwa is the last of nine children, with six brothers and two sisters. Her father died while she was still young, leaving his wife to solely support a large family. At 18, Ajunwa, who had been a keen athletics participant during her school years, gained admission into university but was unable to register due to her mother's inability to pay her tuition. She opted to train as an automobile mechanic instead, but abandoned the idea following her mother's disapproval.

== Football ==
As a professional sportswoman, Ajunwa originally played football for the Nigerian women's team and was a member of The Falcons during the Women's World Cup in 1991, but as she was constantly benched, her skill was seldom used. Of her short-lived football career Ajunwa has stated "I've not regretted the decision [to leave football] because I've made my mark in athletics. I could have continued with football but there was a particular coach. He knew then that I was the best player in the team, but he decided to keep me on the bench throughout every match, so I left the team's camp. She played as an attacker.

== Track and Field ==
Ajunwa performed as a track and field athlete and specialised in the 100 m, 200 m and long jump. She competed at the 1990 Commonwealth Games, winning a bronze medal in the 4 × 100 metres relay, and competed at the African Championships in 1989 and the All Africa Games in 1991 where she won gold medals in the long jump. Ajunwa was banned from the sport for four years after failing a drug test in 1992 despite maintaining her innocence.

Following the completion of her suspension, Ajunwa went on to become the first West-African woman, as well as the first Nigerian, to win an Olympic gold medal in a track and field event when she emerged victorious in the women's long jump event at the 1996 Olympics in Atlanta, with a jump length of 7.12 meters (on her first attempt) during the final. In 2003, she stated in an interview with The Vanguard "I toiled so much for this country, but then I was dumped...That I could be the only individual gold medal winner for Nigeria in over half- a-century of participation in the Olympics and I could still be treated like a scourge, I couldn't believe it."

== Recognition ==
=== Member of the Order of Niger ===
Following her Olympic gold medal at Atlanta '96, Ajunwa was given a national award – Member of the Order of Niger (MON) – by the then Head of State of Nigeria Sani Abacha, but complained that she was overlooked compared to the Nigerian football team claiming "I was given the MON award, right, but without 'E-Y.' When I heard of what was given to my brothers in the Super Eagles for winning the Nations Cup, I was amazed because you can see the difference...I'm not envious of anybody but this is the time to express my feelings that I deserve more."

=== Community Chieftaincy Title ===
Imo State awarded her a chieftaincy title.

=== Nigeria Golden Jubilee Independence Awards ===
On 1 October 2010, Nigeria celebrated its 50th Independence anniversary. As part of that celebration, on Thursday 30 September 2010, President Goodluck Jonathan conferred special Golden Jubilee Independence Awards on 50 distinguished Nigerians and friends of Nigeria including Ajunwa for their contributions to the development of the country.

=== Appointments and membership of bodies ===
1. Chairperson of the Women's Development Committee of Imo State Football Association. 2011
2. Member of Committee on the Revival of the Nigeria Academicals Sports Competitions. 2011
3. Assistant Commissioner of Police. 2018 - Date

== Anti-doping campaign ==
On Friday 30 April 2010, Ajunwa delivered a paper on "War against the use of illicit Drugs in Sport" at an Interactive Session organised by Athletics Federation of Nigeria (AFN) In the second half of 2010, Ajunwa stepped up her anti-doping activities by starting an integrated campaign aptly tagged 'Compete Fair & Clean'. This personally-financed initiative involves communicating messages directly to athletes and coaches at athletic events. Awareness and Red-flag workshops and seminars are being organised with the Athletics Federation of Nigeria (AFN). Banners are placed at athletic events and informative publications as well as T-shirts with anti-doping messages are given to athletes and coaches.

== See also ==
- List of champions of Africa of athletics
- List of sportspeople sanctioned for doping offences
