= Andrea Philipp =

German sprinter

Personal information
- Born: 29 July 1971 (age 54) Bützow, East Germany
Medal record
Women's athletics
Representing Germany
World Championships
Bronze medal – third place	1999 Seville	200 metres
European Championships
Silver medal – second place	1998 Budapest	4 × 100 metres

Andrea Philipp (born 29 July 1971) is a retired German sprinter. A three-time Olympian, she won a bronze medal in the 200 metres at the 1999 World Championships (tied with Merlene Frazer), and a gold medal in the 100 metres at the 1990 World Junior Championships.

== Biography ==
Born in Bützow, her personal best time in the 200 metres is 22.25 seconds, achieved during the heats of the 1999 World Championships in Seville. This places her eighth on the German all-time list, behind Marita Koch, Heike Drechsler, Marlies Göhr, Silke Gladisch, Bärbel Wöckel, Katrin Krabbe and Gesine Walther. In the 100 metres she has a personal best time of 11.05 seconds, achieved in June 1997 in Dortmund.

She competed for the clubs Schweriner SC, TV Schriesheim and LG Olympia Dortmund during her active career.

== International competitions ==
Year	Competition	Venue	Position	Event	Notes
Representing East Germany
1990	World Junior Championships	Plovdiv, Bulgaria	1st	100 m	11.36 (wind: +0.9 m/s)
Representing Germany
1991	World Indoor Championships	Seville, Spain	15th (sf)	60 m	7.47
1991	World Championships	Tokyo, Japan	28th (qf)	100 m	11.80
1992	European Indoor Championships	Genoa, Italy	9th (sf)	60 m	7.37
1992	Olympic Games	Barcelona, Spain	24th (qf)	100 m	11.67
1992	Olympic Games	Barcelona, Spain	5th	4 × 100 m relay	43.12
1993	World Championships	Stuttgart, Germany	5th	4 × 100 m relay	42.79
1996	Olympic Games	Atlanta, United States	16th (qf)	100 m	11.38
1996	Olympic Games	Atlanta, United States	DNF (h)	4 × 100 m relay	—
1997	World Championships	Athens, Greece	4th	4 × 100 m relay	42.44
1998	European Championships	Budapest, Hungary	2nd	4 × 100 m relay	42.68
1998	World Cup	Johannesburg, South Africa	6th	100 m	11.25
1998	World Cup	Johannesburg, South Africa	3rd	4 × 100 m relay	42.81
1999	World Indoor Championships	Maebashi, Japan	11th (sf)	60 m	7.17
1999	World Championships	Seville, Spain	3rd	200 m	22.26
1999	World Championships	Seville, Spain	5th	4 × 100 m relay	42.63
2000	Olympic Games	Sydney, Australia	6th	4 × 100 m relay	43.11

(#) Indicates overall position in qualifying heats (h) quarterfinals (qf) or semifinals (sf).

== See also ==
- German all-time top lists - 200 metres
