= Natalya Ignatova =

Russian sprinter

Personal information
- Nationality: Russian
- Born: 28 December 1973 (age 52) Moscow, Soviet Union

Sport
- Sport: Sprinting
- Event: 100 metres
Medal record
Representing Russia
European Championships
Bronze medal – third place	2002 Munich	4x100 m relay
Summer Universiade
Silver medal – second place	1997 Catania	4x100 m relay

Natalya Leonidova Ignatova (Russian: Ната́лья Леони́довна Игна́това; born 28 December 1973) is a Russian sprinter. She competed in the women's 100 metres at the 2000 Summer Olympics.
