= 1992 IAAF World Cup – Results =

These are the full results of the 1992 IAAF World Cup which was held on 25, 26 and 27 September 1992 at the Estadio Panamericano in Havana, Cuba.

== Results ==
=== 100 m ===
==== Men ====
25 September
Wind: -0.3 m/s

| Rank | Athlete | Team | Time | Points | Notes |
|---|---|---|---|---|---|
| 1 | Linford Christie | Great Britain | 10.21 | 8 | |
| 2 | Olapade Adeniken (NGR) | Africa | 10.26 | 7 | |
| 3 | Calvin Smith | United States | 10.33 | 6 | |
| 4 | Robson da Silva (BRA) | Americas | 10.34 | 5 | |
| 5 | Talal Mansoor (QAT) | Asia | 10.36 | 4 | |
| 6 | Shane Naylor (AUS) | Oceania | 10.50 | 3 | |
| 7 | Andrey Fedoriv (RUS) | Unified Team | 10.67 | 2 | |
| 8 | Giorgio Marras (ITA) | Europe | 10.70 | 1 | |

==== Women ====
26 September
Wind: +1.1 m/s

| Rank | Athlete | Team | Time | Points | Notes |
|---|---|---|---|---|---|
| 1 | Natalya Voronova (RUS) | Unified Team | 11.33 | 8 | |
| 2 | Liliana Allen (CUB) | Americas | 11.34 | 7 | |
| 3 | Tian Yumei (CHN) | Asia | 11.44 | 6 | |
| 4 | Melinda Gainsford (AUS) | Oceania | 11.53 | 5 | |
| 5 | Christy Opara-Thompson (NGR) | Africa | 11.71 | 4 | |
| 6 | Sheila Echols | United States | 11.72 | 3 | |
| 7 | Sabine Günther | Germany | 11.74 | 2 | |
| 8 | Sisko Hanhijoki (FIN) | Europe | 11.76 | 1 | |

=== 200 m ===
==== Men ====
27 September
Wind: +0.5 m/s

| Rank | Athlete | Team | Time | Points | Notes |
|---|---|---|---|---|---|
| 1 | Robson da Silva (BRA) | Americas | 20.56 | 8 | |
| 2 | Linford Christie | Great Britain | 20.72 | 7 | |
| 3 | Jeff Williams | United States | 20.75 | 6 | |
| 4 | Oluyemi Kayode (NGR) | Africa | 20.77 | 5 | |
| 5 | Patrick Stevens (BEL) | Europe | 20.81 | 4 | |
| 6 | Zhao Cunlin (CHN) | Asia | 20.92 | 3 | |
| 7 | Edvin Ivanov (RUS) | Unified Team | 21.39 | 2 | |
| 8 | Chad Stephenson (AUS) | Oceania | 21.49 | 1 | |

==== Women ====
27 September
Wind: -0.3 m/s

| Rank | Athlete | Team | Time | Points | Notes |
|---|---|---|---|---|---|
| 1 | Marie-José Pérec (FRA) | Europe | 23.07 | 8 | |
| 2 | Natalya Voronova (RUS) | Unified Team | 23.24 | 7 | |
| 3 | Chen Zhaojing (CHN) | Asia | 23.27 | 6 | |
| 4 | Melinda Gainsford (AUS) | Oceania | 23.46 | 5 | |
| 5 | Dyan Webber | United States | 23.60 | 4 | |
| 6 | Sabine Günther | Germany | 23.69 | 3 | |
| 7 | Christy Opara-Thompson (NGR) | Africa | 24.49 | 2 | |

=== 400 m ===
==== Men ====
26 September

| Rank | Athlete | Team | Time | Points | Notes |
|---|---|---|---|---|---|
| 1 | Sunday Bada (NGR) | Africa | 44.99 | 8 | |
| 2 | Mark Richardson | Great Britain | 45.86 | 7 | |
| 3 | Chip Jenkins | United States | 46.10 | 6 | |
| 4 | Ibrahim Ismail Muftah (QAT) | Asia | 46.48 | 5 | |
| 5 | Slobodan Branković (YUG) | Europe | 46.87 | 4 | |
| 6 | Michael Joubert (AUS) | Oceania | 47.24 | 3 | |
| 7 | Dmitriy Kliger (RUS) | Unified Team | 47.36 | 2 | |
| 8 | Troy Douglas (BER) | Americas | 47.43 | 1 | |

==== Women ====
27 September

| Rank | Athlete | Team | Time | Points | Notes |
|---|---|---|---|---|---|
| 1 | Jearl Miles | United States | 50.64 | 8 | |
| 2 | Charmaine Crooks (CAN) | Americas | 51.54 | 7 | |
| 3 | Lyudmila Dzhigalova (UKR) | Unified Team | 52.47 | 6 | |
| 4 | Kylie Hanigan (AUS) | Oceania | 52.93 | 5 | |
| 5 | Elsa Devassoigne (FRA) | Europe | 53.40 | 4 | |
| 6 | Anja Rücker | Germany | 53.81 | 3 | |
| 7 | Omotayo Akinremi (NGR) | Africa | 53.84 | 2 | |
| 8 | Shiny Wilson (IND) | Asia | 55.04 | 1 | |

=== 800 m ===
==== Men ====
25 September

| Rank | Athlete | Team | Time | Points | Notes |
|---|---|---|---|---|---|
| 1 | David Sharpe | Great Britain | 1:46.06 | 8 | |
| 2 | William Tanui (KEN) | Africa | 1:46.14 | 7 | |
| 3 | Andrea Benvenuti (ITA) | Europe | 1:46.53 | 6 | |
| 4 | José Luíz Barbosa (BRA) | Americas | 1:47.66 | 5 | |
| 5 | Lee Jin-Il (KOR) | Asia | 1:47.85 | 4 | |
| 6 | Anatoliy Makarevich (BLR) | Unified Team | 1:47.88 | 3 | |
| 7 | Dean Kenneally (AUS) | Oceania | 1:48.32 | 2 | |
| 8 | Terril Davis | United States | 1:48.50 | 1 | |

==== Women ====
26 September

| Rank | Athlete | Team | Time | Points | Notes |
|---|---|---|---|---|---|
| 1 | Maria Mutola (MOZ) | Africa | 2:00.47 | 8 | |
| 2 | Joetta Clark | United States | 2:01.60 | 7 | |
| 3 | Yelena Afanasyeva (RUS) | Unified Team | 2:02.19 | 6 | |
| 4 | Ella Kovacs (ROM) | Europe | 2:03.07 | 5 | |
| 5 | Gabriela Lesch | Germany | 2:03.66 | 4 | |
| 6 | Sandra Dawson (AUS) | Oceania | 2:04.73 | 3 | |
| 7 | Cao Chunying (CHN) | Asia | 2:19.70 | 2 | |
| - | Charmaine Crooks (CAN) | Americas | DNS | 0 | |

=== 1500 m ===
==== Men ====
26 September

| Rank | Athlete | Team | Time | Points | Notes |
|---|---|---|---|---|---|
| 1 | Mohammed Suleiman (QAT) | Asia | 3:38.37 | 8 | |
| 2 | Jonah Birir (KEN) | Africa | 3:40.25 | 7 | |
| 3 | Simon Fairbrother | Great Britain | 3:40.30 | 6 | |
| 4 | Fermín Cacho (ESP) | Europe | 3:42.78 | 5 | |
| 5 | Andrey Loginov (RUS) | Unified Team | 3:43.46 | 4 | |
| 6 | Edgar de Oliveira (BRA) | Americas | 3:45.97 | 3 | |
| 7 | Darren Abbott (AUS) | Oceania | 3:48.56 | 2 | |
| 8 | Charles Marsala | United States | 3:58.51 | 1 | |

==== Women ====
25 September

| Rank | Athlete | Team | Time | Points | Notes |
|---|---|---|---|---|---|
| 1 | Yekaterina Podkopayeva (RUS) | Unified Team | 4:17.60 | 8 | |
| 2 | Małgorzata Rydz (POL) | Europe | 4:18.16 | 7 | |
| 3 | Alisa Hill | United States | 4:18.41 | 6 | |
| 4 | Kristina da Fonseca-Wollheim | Germany | 4:20.39 | 5 | |
| 5 | Gwen Griffiths (RSA) | Africa | 4:21.51 | 4 | |
| 6 | Elizabeth Miller (AUS) | Oceania | 4:24.48 | 3 | |
| 7 | Junko Kataoka (JPN) | Asia | 4:25.40 | 2 | |
| - | Letitia Vriesde (SUR) | Americas | DNS | 0 | |

=== 5000/3000 m ===
==== Men ====
27 September

| Rank | Athlete | Team | Time | Points | Notes |
|---|---|---|---|---|---|
| 1 | Fita Bayissa (ETH) | Africa | 13:41.23 | 8 | |
| 2 | Arturo Barrios (MEX) | Americas | 13:50.95 | 7 | |
| 3 | James Farmer | United States | 14:02.90 | 6 | |
| 4 | Abel Antón (ESP) | Europe | 14:11.48 | 5 | |
| 5 | Wang Helin (CHN) | China | 14:13.68 | 4 | |
| 6 | Phillip Clode (NZL) | Oceania | 14:14.27 | 3 | |
| 7 | John Mayock | Great Britain | 14:16.95 | 2 | |
| 8 | Vyacheslav Shabunin (RUS) | Unified Team | 14:28.74 | 1 | |

==== Women ====
27 September

| Rank | Athlete | Team | Time | Points | Notes |
|---|---|---|---|---|---|
| 1 | Derartu Tulu (ETH) | Africa | 9:05.89 | 8 | |
| 2 | Vera Chuvashova (RUS) | Unified Team | 9:08.30 | 7 | |
| 3 | Margareta Keszeg (ROM) | Europe | 9:09.03 | 6 | |
| 4 | Joan Nesbit | United States | 9:12.09 | 5 | |
| 5 | Claudia Borgschulze | Germany | 9:13.87 | 4 | |
| 6 | Zhong Huandi (CHN) | Asia | 9:14.55 | 3 | |
| 7 | Sonia Betancourt (MEX) | Americas | 9:34.14 | 2 | |
| 8 | Nicole Robinson (AUS) | Oceania | 9:44.88 | 1 | |

=== 10,000 m ===
==== Men ====
25 September

| Rank | Athlete | Team | Time | Points | Notes |
|---|---|---|---|---|---|
| 1 | Addis Abebe (ETH) | Africa | 28:44.38 | 8 | |
| 2 | Antonio Serrano (ESP) | Europe | 28:54.38 | 7 | |
| 3 | Mikhail Dasko (RUS) | Unified Team | 29:00.26 | 6 | |
| 4 | Ian Hamer | Great Britain | 29:14.05 | 5 | |
| 5 | Armando Quintanilla (MEX) | Americas | 29:21.04 | 4 | |
| 6 | Sakae Osaki (JPN) | Asia | 30:05.09 | 3 | |
| 7 | Rodney Higgins (AUS) | Oceania | 30:20.00 | 2 | |
| 8 | Peter Sherry | United States | 30:38.57 | 1 | |

==== Women ====
26 September

| Rank | Athlete | Team | Time | Points | Notes |
|---|---|---|---|---|---|
| 1 | Derartu Tulu (ETH) | Africa | 33:38.97 | 8 | |
| 2 | Christien Toonstra (NED) | Europe | 33:46.19 | 7 | |
| 3 | Zhong Huandi (CHN) | Asia | 33:53.09 | 6 | |
| 4 | Yelena Zhupiyova (UKR) | Unified Team | 33:59.99 | 5 | |
| 5 | Anne Marie Letko | Unified States | 34:14.18 | 4 | |
| 6 | Monika Schäfer | Germany | 34:35.60 | 3 | |
| 7 | María Luisa Servín (MEX) | Americas | 34:55.33 | 2 | |
| 8 | Raewyn O'Donnell (NZL) | Oceania | 35:25.46 | 1 | |

=== 110/100 m hurdles ===
==== Men ====
26 September
Wind: +0.3 m/s

| Rank | Athlete | Team | Time | Points | Notes |
|---|---|---|---|---|---|
| 1 | Colin Jackson | Great Britain | 13.07 | 8 | |
| 2 | Sergey Usov (UZB) | Unified Team | 13.55 | 7 | |
| 3 | Emilio Valle (CUB) | Americas | 13.69 | 6 | |
| 4 | John Owens | United States | 13.76 | 5 | |
| 5 | Kyle Vander-Kuyp (AUS) | Oceania | 13.83 | 4 | |
| 6 | Claes Albihn (SWE) | Europe | 14.12 | 3 | |
| 7 | Marcellin Dally (CIV) | Africa | 14.39 | 2 | |
| 8 | Kazuhiko Yamazaki (JPN) | Asia | 14.83 | 1 | |

==== Women ====
26 September
Wind: -0.8 m/s

| Rank | Athlete | Team | Time | Points | Notes |
|---|---|---|---|---|---|
| 1 | Aliuska López (CUB) | Americas | 13.06 | 8 | |
| 2 | Anne Piquereau (FRA) | Europe | 13.13 | 7 | |
| 3 | Gabi Roth | Germany | 13.34 | 6 | |
| 4 | Zhang Yu (CHN) | Asia | 13.35 | 5 | |
| 5 | Kim McKenzie | United States | 13.36 | 4 | |
| 6 | Ime Akpan (NGR) | Africa | 13.57 | 3 | |
| 7 | Jayne Moyes (AUS) | Oceania | 13.83 | 2 | |
| 8 | Yelena Politika (UKR) | Unified Team | 13.89 | 1 | |

=== 400 m hurdles ===
==== Men ====
25 September

| Rank | Athlete | Team | Time | Points | Notes |
|---|---|---|---|---|---|
| 1 | Samuel Matete (ZAM) | Africa | 48.88 | 8 | |
| 2 | Jonathan Ridgeon | Great Britain | 49.01 | 7 | |
| 3 | Stéphane Diagana (FRA) | Europe | 49.34 | 6 | |
| 4 | Kazuhiko Yamazaki (JPN) | Asia | 50.13 | 5 | |
| 5 | Oleg Tverdokhleb (UKR) | Unified Team | 51.13 | 4 | |
| 6 | Manesh Pillay (AUS) | Oceania | 51.13 | 3 | |
| 7 | Nat Page | United States | 51.77 | 2 | |

==== Women ====
25 September

| Rank | Athlete | Team | Time | Points | Notes |
|---|---|---|---|---|---|
| 1 | Sandra Farmer-Patrick | United States | 55.38 | 8 | |
| 2 | Gowry Retchakan (GBR) | Europe | 55.66 | 7 | |
| 3 | Margarita Ponomaryova (RUS) | Unified Team | 56.46 | 6 | |
| 4 | Linda Kisabaka | Germany | 57.50 | 5 | |
| 5 | Zhang Weimin (CHN) | Asia | 57.66 | 4 | |
| 6 | Nezha Bidouane (MAR) | Africa | 58.30 | 3 | |
| 7 | Leisa Bruce (AUS) | Oceania | 1:00.07 | 2 | |
| - | Rosey Edeh (CAN) | Americas | DNS | 0 | |

=== 3000 m steeplechase ===
==== Men ====
26 September

| Rank | Athlete | Team | Time | Points | Notes |
|---|---|---|---|---|---|
| 1 | Philip Barkutwo (KEN) | Africa | 8:26.81 | 8 | |
| 2 | William Van Dijck (BEL) | Europe | 8:32.06 | 7 | |
| 3 | Shaun Creighton (AUS) | Oceania | 8:33.79 | 6 | |
| 4 | Hamid Sajjadi (IRI) | Asia | 8:44.85 | 5 | |
| 5 | Vladimir Pronin (RUS) | Unified Team | 8:45.35 | 4 | |
| 6 | Colin Walker | Great Britain | 8:47.61 | 3 | |
| 7 | Dan Nelson | United States | 9:03.27 | 2 | |
| - | Clodoaldo do Carmo (BRA) | Americas | DNF | 0 | |

=== 4 × 100 m relay ===
==== Men ====
26 September

| Rank | Team | Athletes | Time | Points | Notes |
|---|---|---|---|---|---|
| 1 | United States | Bryan Bridgewater, Kevin Braunskill, Calvin Smith, Jeff Williams | 38.48 | 8 | |
| 2 | Americas | Andrés Simón (CUB), Joel Lamela (CUB), Joel Isasi (CUB), Robson da Silva (BRA) | 38.51 | 7 | |
| 3 | Africa | John Myles-Mills (GHA), Olapade Adeniken (NGR), Oluyemi Kayode (NGR), Sanusi Turay (SLE) | 39.08 | 6 | |
| 4 | Great Britain | Allyn Condon, Darren Campbell, Jamie Baulch, Jason Fergus | 39.40 | 5 | |
| 5 | Unified Team | Pavel Galkin (RUS), Edvin Ivanov (RUS), Andrey Fedoriv (RUS), Igor Streltsov (UKR) | 39.57 | 4 | |
| 6 | Oceania | Gus Nketia (NZL), Shane Naylor (AUS), Brett Leavy (AUS), Peter Crane (AUS) | 39.63 | 3 | |
| 7 | Europe | Christoph Pöstinger (AUT), Steffen Bringmann (GER), Giorgio Marras (ITA), Marco Menchini (ITA) | 39.67 | 2 | |
| 8 | Asia | Zhang Hong (CHN), Wu Jianhui (CHN), Zhao Cunlin (CHN), Zheng Cheng (CHN) | 39.89 | 1 | |

==== Women ====
27 September

| Rank | Team | Athletes | Time | Points | Notes |
|---|---|---|---|---|---|
| 1 | Asia | Gao Han (CHN), Tian Yumei (CHN), Chen Zhaojing (CHN), Xiao Yehua (CHN) | 43.63 | 8 | |
| 2 | Europe | Valérie Jean-Charles (FRA), Odiah Sidibé (FRA), Odile Singa (FRA), Marie-José Pérec (FRA) | 44.02 | 7 | |
| 3 | Africa | Lalao Ravaoniriana (MAD), Rufina Ubah (NGR), Faith Idehen (NGR), Christy Opara-Thompson (NGR) | 44.21 | 6 | |
| 4 | Americas | Liliana Allen (CUB), Aliuska López (CUB), Myra Mayberry (PUR), Norfalia Carabalí (COL) | 44.52 | 5 | |
| 5 | Unified Team | Zhanna Tarnopolskaya (UKR), Natalya Voronova (RUS), Yelena Mizera (RUS), Olga Bogoslovskaya (RUS) | 44.55 | 4 | |
| 6 | Germany | Anja Bohme, Jana Schönenberger, Gabi Roth, Sabine Günther | 44.63 | 3 | |
| 7 | United States | Kim McKenzie, Kendra Mackey, Wenda Vereen, Dyan Webber | 45.03 | 2 | |
| | Oceania | Esther Paolo (AUS), Michelle Seymour (NZL), Melinda Gainsford (AUS), Veronica Lee (AUS) | DQ | 0 | |

=== 4 × 400 m relay ===
==== Men ====
27 September

| Rank | Team | Athletes | Time | Points | Notes |
|---|---|---|---|---|---|
| 1 | Africa | Benyounès Lahlou (MAR), Samuel Matete (ZAM), Simon Kemboi (KEN), Sunday Bada (NGR) | 3:02.14 | 8 | |
| 2 | Americas | Lázaro Martínez (CUB), Devon Morris (JAM), Troy Douglas (BER), Norberto Téllez (CUB) | 3:02.95 | 7 | |
| 3 | Great Britain | Du'aine Ladejo, Jon Ridgeon, Allyn Condon, Mark Richardson | 3:03.95 | 6 | |
| 4 | United States | Frank Atwater, Willie Caldwell, Antonio Pettigrew, Chip Jenkins | 3:03.80 | 5 | |
| 5 | Europe | Andrea Nuti (ITA), Rico Lieder (GER), Jens Carlowitz (GER), Stéphane Diagana (FRA) | 3:04.53 | 4 | |
| 6 | Asia | Masayoshi Kan (JPN), Takahiro Watanabe (JPN), Koji Ito (JPN), Ibrahim Ismail Muftah (QAT) | 3:05.30 | 3 | |
| 7 | Oceania | Anthony Ryan (AUS), Michael Joubert (AUS), Manesh Pillay (AUS), Jason Hooker (AUS) | 3:07.22 | 2 | |
| 8 | Unified Team | Andrey Plantonov (RUS), Dmitriy Kosov (RUS), Dmitriy Kliger (RUS), Dmitriy Golovastov (RUS) | 3:10.38 | 1 | |

==== Women ====
25 September

| Rank | Team | Athletes | Time | Points | Notes |
|---|---|---|---|---|---|
| 1 | Americas | Rosey Edeh (CAN), Charmaine Crooks (CAN), Norfalia Carabalí (COL), Ximena Restrepo (COL) | 3:29.73 | 8 | |
| 2 | Unified Team | Marina Shmonina (RUS), Lyudmila Dzhigalova (UKR), Margarita Ponomaryova (RUS), Yelena Ruzina (RUS) | 3:30.43 | 7 | |
| 3 | Africa | Tina Paulino (MOZ), Omolade Akinremi (NGR), Maria Mutola (MOZ), Omotayo Akinremi (NGR) | 3:31.90 | 6 | |
| 4 | United States | Terri Dendy, Kendra Mackey, Ann Graham, Jearl Miles | 3:33.43 | 5 | |
| 5 | Germany | Helga Arendt, Anja Rücker, Anja Böhme, Linda Kisabaka | 3:34.33 | 4 | |
| 6 | Oceania | Kylie Hanigan (AUS), Maree Holland (AUS), Lee Naylor (AUS), Tania Van Heer (AUS) | 3:34.48 | 3 | |
| 7 | Europe | Elsa Devassoigne (FRA), Ester Goosens (NED), Kathrin Lüthi (SUI), Monica Westén (SWE) | 3:36.48 | 2 | |
| 8 | Asia | Kutty Saramma (IND), Ma Yuqin (CHN), Cao Chunying (CHN), Shiny Wilson (IND) | 3:41.94 | 1 | |

=== High jump ===
==== Men ====
27 September

| Rank | Athlete | Team | Result | Points | Notes |
|---|---|---|---|---|---|
| 1 | Yuriy Sergiyenko (UKR) | Unified Team | 2.29 | 8 | |
| 2 | Javier Sotomayor (CUB) | America | 2.26 | 7 | |
| 3 | Brendan Reilly | Great Britain | 2.26 | 6 | |
| 4 | Lee Jin-taek (KOR) | Asia | 2.23 | 5 | |
| 5 | Tony Barton | United States | 2.20 | 4 | |
| 6 | Othmane Belfaa (ALG) | Africa | 2.15 | 3 | |
| 7 | Gustavo Becker (ESP) | Europe | 2.15 | 2 | |
| 8 | Michael Hawkey (AUS) | Oceania | 2.15 | 1 | |

==== Women ====
25 September

| Rank | Athlete | Team | Result | Points | Notes |
|---|---|---|---|---|---|
| 1 | Ioamnet Quintero (CUB) | Americas | 1.94 | 8 | |
| 2 | Alina Astafei (ROM) | Europe | 1.91 | 7 | |
| 3 | Lucienne N'Da (CIV) | Africa | 1.88 | 6 | |
| 4 | Birgit Kähler | Germany | 1.85 | 5 | |
| 5 | Yelena Gribanova (RUS) | Unified Team | 1.85 | 4 | |
| 6 | Donna Robertson (AUS) | Oceania | 1.75 | 2 | |
| 6 | Megumi Sato (JPN) | Asia | 1.75 | 2 | |
| 6 | Amber Welty | United States | 1.75 | 2 | |

=== Pole vault ===
==== Men ====
26 September

| Rank | Athlete | Team | Result | Points | Notes |
|---|---|---|---|---|---|
| 1 | Igor Potapovich (KAZ) | Unified Team | 5.60 | 8 | |
| 2 | Philippe Collet (FRA) | Europe | 5.40 | 7 | |
| 3 | Okkert Brits (RSA) | Africa | 5.30 | 6 | |
| 4 | Hideyuki Takei (JPN) | Asia | 5.30 | 5 | |
| - | Simon Arkell (AUS) | Oceania | NM | 0 | |
| - | Edgar Díaz (PUR) | Americas | NM | 0 | |
| - | Kory Tarpenning | United States | NM | 0 | |
| - | Neil Winter | Great Britain | NM | 0 | |

=== Long jump ===
==== Men ====
25 September

| Rank | Athlete | Team | Result | Points | Notes |
|---|---|---|---|---|---|
| 1 | Iván Pedroso (CUB) | Americas | 7.97 | 8 | |
| 2 | Gordon McKee | United States | 7.89 | 7 | |
| 3 | Chen Zunrong (CHN) | Asia | 7.84 | 6 | |
| 4 | Mark Forsythe | Great Britain | 7.81 | 5 | |
| 5 | Kostas Koukodimos (GRE) | Europe | 7.71 | 4 | |
| 6 | Ayodele Aladefa (NGR) | Africa | 7.53 | 3 | |
| 7 | Jonathon Moyle (NZL) | Oceania | 7.38 | 2 | |
| 8 | Robert Emmiyan (ARM) | Unified Team | 7.27 | 1 | |

==== Women ====
27 September

| Rank | Athlete | Team | Result | Points | Notes |
|---|---|---|---|---|---|
| 1 | Heike Drechsler | Germany | 7.16 | 8 | |
| 2 | Yelena Sinchukova (RUS) | Unified Team | 6.85 | 7 | |
| 3 | Ljudmila Ninova (AUT) | Europe | 6.59 | 6 | |
| 4 | Sharon Couch | United States | 6.59 | 5 | |
| 5 | Flora Hyacinth (ISV) | Americas | 6.43 (w) | 4 | |
| 6 | Stella Emefesi (NGR) | Africa | 6.06 | 3 | |
| 7 | Leanne Stapylton-Smith (NZL) | Oceania | 5.81 | 2 | |
| 8 | Liu Shuzhen (CHN) | Asia | 4.78 | 1 | |

=== Triple jump ===
==== Men ====
26 September

| Rank | Athlete | Team | Result | Points | Notes |
|---|---|---|---|---|---|
| 1 | Jonathan Edwards | Great Britain | 17.34 | 8 | |
| 2 | Frank Rutherford (BAH) | Americas | 17.06 | 7 | |
| 3 | Toussaint Rabenala (MAD) | Africa | 17.03 | 6 | |
| 4 | Māris Bružiks (LAT) | Europe | 17.01 | 5 | |
| 5 | Aleksandr Kovalenko (BLR) | Unified Team | 16.85 | 4 | |
| 6 | Ray Kimble | United States | 16.35 | 3 | |
| 7 | Andrew Murphy (AUS) | Oceania | 15.86 | 2 | |
| 8 | Chen Yanping (CHN) | Asia | 15.68 | 1 | |

==== Women ====
25 September

| Rank | Athlete | Team | Result | Points | Notes |
|---|---|---|---|---|---|
| 1 | Li Huirong (CHN) | Asia | 13.88 | 8 | |
| 2 | Galina Chistyakova (RUS) | Unified Team | 13.67 | 7 | |
| 3 | Eloína Echevarría (CUB) | Americas | 13.45 | 6 | |
| 4 | Sheila Hudson | United States | 13.38 | 5 | |
| 5 | Šárka Kašpárková (TCH) | Europe | 13.31 | 4 | |
| 6 | Helga Radtke | Germany | 13.26 | 3 | |
| 7 | Leanne Stapylton-Smith (NZL) | Oceania | 12.51 | 2 | |
| 8 | Sonia Agbessi (BEN) | Africa | 11.74 | 1 | |

=== Shot put ===
==== Men ====
25 September

| Rank | Athlete | Team | Result | Points | Notes |
|---|---|---|---|---|---|
| 1 | Mike Stulce | United States | 21.34 | 8 | |
| 2 | Mike Stulce (RUS) | Unified Team | 20.14 | 7 | |
| 3 | Werner Günthör (SUI) | Europe | 19.75 | 6 | |
| 4 | Gert Weil (CHI) | Americas | 19.05 | 5 | |
| 5 | Paul Edwards | Great Britain | 18.61 | 4 | |
| 6 | Ma Yongfeng (CHN) | Asia | 18.56 | 3 | |
| 7 | Chima Ugwu (NGR) | Africa | 18.51 | 2 | |
| 8 | Courtney Ireland (NZL) | Oceania | 17.63 | 1 | |

==== Women ====
26 September

| Rank | Athlete | Team | Result | Points | Notes |
|---|---|---|---|---|---|
| 1 | Belsy Laza (CUB) | Americas | 19.19 | 8 | |
| 2 | Marina Antonyuk (RUS) | Unified Team | 17.98 | 7 | |
| 3 | Kathrin Neimke | Germany | 17.97 | 6 | |
| 4 | Connie Price-Smith | United States | 17.82 | 5 | |
| 5 | Mihaela Oana (ROM) | Europe | 16.45 | 4 | |
| 6 | Min Chunfeng (CHN) | Asia | 16.40 | 3 | |
| 7 | Fouzia Fatihi (MAR) | Africa | 14.87 | 2 | |
| 8 | Christine King (NZL) | Oceania | 14.48 | 1 | |

=== Discus throw ===
==== Men ====
26 September

| Rank | Athlete | Team | Result | Points | Notes |
|---|---|---|---|---|---|
| 1 | Anthony Washington | United States | 64.86 | 8 | |
| 2 | Roberto Moya (CUB) | Americas | 63.66 | 7 | |
| 3 | Yu Wenge (CHN) | Asia | 63.06 | 6 | |
| 4 | Romas Ubartas (LTU) | Europe | 61.52 | 5 | |
| 5 | Adewale Olukoju (NGR) | Africa | 59.42 | 4 | |
| 6 | Dmitriy Kovtsun (UKR) | Unified Team | 58.46 | 3 | |
| 7 | John Hancy (AUS) | Oceania | 55.94 | 2 | |
| 8 | Glen Smith | Great Britain | 53.76 | 1 | |

==== Women ====
27 September

| Rank | Athlete | Team | Result | Points | Notes |
|---|---|---|---|---|---|
| 1 | Maritza Martén (CUB) | Americas | 69.30 | 8 | |
| 2 | Ilke Wyludda | Germany | 67.90 | 7 | |
| 3 | Min Chunfeng (CHN) | Asia | 63.38 | 6 | |
| 4 | Larisa Korotkevich (BLR) | Unified Team | 62.86 | 5 | |
| 5 | Manuela Tirneci (ROM) | Europe | 57.92 | 4 | |
| 6 | Nanette van der Walt (RSA) | Africa | 56.50 | 3 | |
| 7 | Connie Price-Smith | United States | 53.12 | 2 | |
| 8 | Elizabeth Ryan (NZL) | Oceania | 48.36 | 1 | |

=== Hammer throw ===
==== Men ====
26 September

| Rank | Athlete | Team | Result | Points | Notes |
|---|---|---|---|---|---|
| 1 | Tibor Gécsek (HUN) | Europe | 80.44 | 8 | |
| 2 | Igor Nikulin (RUS) | Unified Team | 78.28 | 7 | |
| 3 | Lance Deal | United States | 77.08 | 6 | |
| 4 | Bi Zhong (CHN) | Asia | 75.30 | 5 | |
| 5 | Andrés Charadía (ARG) | Americas | 71.62 | 4 | |
| 6 | Paul Head | Great Britain | 70.32 | 3 | |
| 7 | Hakim Toumi (ALG) | Africa | 68.14 | 2 | |
| 8 | Phillip Spivey (AUS) | Oceania | 66.68 | 1 | |

=== Javelin throw ===
==== Men ====
27 September

| Rank | Athlete | Team | Result | Points | Notes |
|---|---|---|---|---|---|
| 1 | Jan Železný (TCH) | Europe | 88.26 | 8 | |
| 2 | Tom Petranoff (RSA) | Africa | 79.90 | 7 | |
| 3 | Vladimir Sasimovich (BLR) | Unified Team | 78.40 | 6 | |
| 4 | Tom Pukstys | United States | 77.76 | 5 | |
| 5 | Mick Hill | Great Britain | 76.84 | 4 | |
| 6 | Zhang Lianbiao (CHN) | Asia | 75.42 | 3 | |
| 7 | John Stapylton-Smith (NZL) | Oceania | 70.00 | 2 | |
| 8 | Steve Feraday (CAN) | Americas | 68.76 | 1 | |

==== Women ====
26 September

| Rank | Athlete | Team | Result | Points | Notes |
|---|---|---|---|---|---|
| 1 | Tessa Sanderson (GBR) | Europe | 61.86 | 8 | |
| 2 | Irina Kostyuchenkova (UKR) | Unified Team | 58.10 | 7 | |
| 3 | Dulce García (CUB) | Americas | 58.08 | 6 | |
| 4 | Xu Demei (CHN) | Asia | 57.80 | 5 | |
| 5 | Donna Mayhew | United States | 57.30 | 4 | |
| 6 | Steffi Nerius | Germany | 56.24 | 3 | |
| 7 | Sue Howland (AUS) | Oceania | 55.82 | 2 | |
| 8 | Seraphine Nyauma (KEN) | Africa | 48.58 | 1 | |
