= Athletics at the 1992 Summer Olympics – Women's 100 metres =

Women's 100 metres at the Games of the XXV Olympiad
- Venue: Olympic Stadium
- Dates: 31 July 1992 (heats, quarter-finals); 1 August 1992 (semi-finals, finals)
- Competitors: 55 from 41 nations
- Winning time: 10.82

Medalists
1st place, gold medalist(s)		Gail Devers; United States
2nd place, silver medalist(s)		Juliet Cuthbert; Jamaica
3rd place, bronze medalist(s)		Irina Privalova; Unified Team

Official Video Highlights

The women's 100 metres was an event at the 1992 Summer Olympics in Barcelona, Spain. There were a total of 55 participating athletes, with seven qualifying heats. The top four in each heat qualified for the quarterfinals along with the four fastest remaining.

The world record holder and defending gold medalist Florence Griffith-Joyner had retired. The returning silver medalist, 35 year old Evelyn Ashford ran fast in the quarterfinals but was eliminated in the semis. Other returning veterans included Merlene Ottey, who won her first Olympic medal in 1980, Anelia Nuneva who made a heroic attempt to keep up with Griffith-Joyner four years earlier, only to have her hamstring explode in the attempt. Through the semi-final round, Juliet Cuthbert had the fastest qualifying time, while Gwen Torrence was the winner of the other semi-final. Both Cuthbert and Torrence were also returning finalists from 1988. Irina Privalova, Mary Onyali and Liliana Allen were younger sprinters. As the world championship silver medalist in the 100 metres hurdles, Gail Devers was known as a hurdler and didn't carry a strong reputation as a sprinter, though she had finished a distant second in Griffith-Joyner's world record race.

From the gun in the final, Privalova leaped out to an early lead in lane 6. Less noticed in lane 2, Devers also got a slight edge on the two Jamaicans and Torrence in the middle of the track. But Privalova couldn't put them away, instead all three were slowly gaining on the early leaders, with Cuthbert gaining a slight edge amongst the three. By the finish, Devers, Cuthbert, Privalova and Torrence all were within a foot of one another, with Ottey only another foot back. Separated by inches, Devers beat Cuthbert to the line. Privalova barely arrived ahead of Torrence who passed her in the next step after the line.

Four years later, it would be Devers again by inches ahead of Ottey and Torrence to become only the second woman to win the 100 twice in a row.

== Records ==
These were the standing world and Olympic records (in seconds) prior to the 1992 Summer Olympics.

World record	10.49	(United States) Florence Griffith-Joyner	Indianapolis (USA)	July 16, 1988
Olympic record	10.54	(United States) Florence Griffith-Joyner	Seoul (KOR)	September 24, 1988

== Results ==
=== Heats ===
First 4 from each heat (Q) and the next 4 fastest (q) qualified for the semifinals.

Rank	Heat	Athlete	Nation	Time	Notes
1	3	Juliet Cuthbert	Jamaica	11.14	Q
2	4	Gail Devers	United States	11.23	Q
3	6	Evelyn Ashford	United States	11.23	Q
4	1	Merlene Ottey	Jamaica	11.26	Q
5	5	Gwen Torrence	United States	11.28	Q
6	7	Beatrice Utondu	Nigeria	11.30	Q
7	3	Anelia Nuneva	Bulgaria	11.34	Q
8	6	Mary Onyali	Nigeria	11.37	Q
9	5	Christy Opara	Nigeria	11.39	Q
10	2	Irina Privalova	Unified Team	11.42	Q
11	6	Wang Huei-Chen	Chinese Taipei	11.43	Q
12	1	Sisko Hanhijoki	Finland	11.44	Q
13	3	Elinda Vorster	South Africa	11.45	Q
13	7	Olga Bogoslovskaya	Unified Team	11.45	Q
15	7	Nelli Fiere-Cooman	Netherlands	11.47	Q
16	4	Pauline Davis-Thompson	Bahamas	11.48	Q
17	5	Liliana Allen	Cuba	11.49	Q
18	1	Patricia Girard	France	11.51	Q
19	3	Melinda Gainsford	Australia	11.57	Q
19	7	Laurence Bily	France	11.57	Q
21	6	Lucrécia Jardim	Portugal	11.58	Q
22	2	Kerry Johnson	Australia	11.62	Q
22	3	Odiah Sidibé	France	11.62	q
24	4	Stephanie Douglas	Great Britain	11.65	Q
25	4	Myra Mayberry-Wilkinson	Puerto Rico	11.67	Q
26	1	Gao Han	China	11.68	Q
26	6	Tian Yumei	China	11.68	q
28	2	Xiao Yehua	China	11.69	Q
28	7	Sabine Tröger	Austria	11.69	q
30	1	Cristina Castro Salvador	Spain	11.72	q
31	2	Dahlia Duhaney	Jamaica	11.73	Q
31	5	Andrea Philipp	Germany	11.73	Q
33	5	Lalao Robine Ravaoniriana	Madagascar	11.74	
34	4	Heather Samuel	Antigua and Barbuda	11.76	
35	5	Patricia Foufoué Ziga	Ivory Coast	11.77	
36	2	Karen Clarke	Canada	11.79	
37	2	N'Deye Binta Dia	Senegal	11.83	
38	2	Damayanthi Darsha	Sri Lanka	11.88	
39	3	Ratjai Sripet	Thailand	11.99	
40	7	Marcel Winkler	South Africa	12.01	
41	6	Dawnette Douglas	Bermuda	12.05	
42	4	Gaily Dube	Zimbabwe	12.08	
43	1	Trương Hoàng Mỹ Linh	Vietnam	12.11	
44	3	Monique Kengné	Cameroon	12.12	
44	6	Zoila Stewart	Costa Rica	12.12	
46	5	Ngozi Mwanamwambwa	Zambia	12.13	
47	7	Aminata Konaté	Guinea	12.33	
48	1	Gail Prescod	Saint Vincent and the Grenadines	12.41	
49	3	Vaciseva Tavaga	Fiji	12.47	
50	6	Deirdre Caruana	Malta	12.59	
51	5	Muyegbe Mubala	Zaire	12.76	
52	4	Laure Kuetey	Benin	13.11	
53	2	Aminath Rishtha	Maldives	13.66	
	7	Magdalena Ansue	Equatorial Guinea	DSQ	
	4	Antónia de Jesus	Angola	DNS	

=== Quarterfinals ===
==== Quarterfinal 1 ====
Rank	Athlete	Nation	Time	Notes
1	Evelyn Ashford	United States	11.13	Q
2	Beatrice Utondu	Nigeria	11.31	Q
3	Sisko Hanhijoki	Finland	11.50	Q
4	Patricia Girard	France	11.54	Q
5	Kerry Johnson	Australia	11.59	
6	Dahlia Duhaney	Jamaica	11.61	
7	Lucrécia Jardim	Portugal	11.66	
8	Tian Yumei	China	11.78	

==== Quarterfinal 2 ====
Rank	Athlete	Nation	Time	Notes
1	Juliet Cuthbert	Jamaica	11.12	Q
2	Anelia Nuneva	Bulgaria	11.17	Q
3	Mary Onyali	Nigeria	11.28	Q
4	Elinda Vorster	South Africa	11.44	Q
5	Nelli Fiere-Cooman	Netherlands	11.55	
6	Laurence Bily	France	11.64	
7	Myra Mayberry	Puerto Rico	11.69	
8	Cristina Castro	Spain	11.79	

==== Quarterfinal 3 ====
Rank	Athlete	Nation	Time	Notes
1	Merlene Ottey	Jamaica	11.15	Q
2	Gwen Torrence	United States	11.17	Q
3	Pauline Davis	Bahamas	11.31	Q
4	Olga Bogoslovskaya	Unified Team	11.43	Q
5	Odiah Sidibé	France	11.63	
6	Andrea Philipp	Germany	11.67	
7	Xiao Yehua	China	11.73	
8	Stephanie Douglas	Great Britain	11.77	

==== Quarterfinal 4 ====
Rank	Athlete	Nation	Time	Notes
1	Irina Privalova	Unified Team	10.98	Q
2	Gail Devers	United States	11.17	Q
3	Liliana Allen	Cuba	11.33	Q
4	Christy Opara-Thompson	Nigeria	11.42	Q
5	Wang Huei-Chen	Chinese Taipei	11.57	
6	Melinda Gainsford	Australia	11.67	
7	Gao Han	China	11.76	
8	Sabine Tröger	Austria	11.76	

=== Semifinals ===
==== Semifinal 1 ====
Wind: -2.9

Rank	Athlete	Nation	Time	Notes
1	Gwen Torrence	United States	11.02	Q
2	Merlene Ottey	Jamaica	11.07	Q
3	Irina Privalova	Unified Team	11.08	Q
4	Mary Onyali	Nigeria	11.30	Q
5	Pauline Davis	Bahamas	11.34	
6	Christy Opara-Thompson	Nigeria	11.47	
7	Sisko Hanhijoki	Finland	11.65	
8	Patricia Girard	France	11.70	

==== Semifinal 2 ====
Wind: -0.8

Rank	Athlete	Nation	Time	Notes
1	Juliet Cuthbert	Jamaica	10.98	Q
2	Gail Devers	United States	11.12	Q
3	Anelia Nuneva	Bulgaria	11.17	Q
4	Liliana Allen	Cuba	11.28	Q
5	Evelyn Ashford	United States	11.29	
6	Elinda Vorster	South Africa	11.44	
7	Olga Bogoslovskaya	Unified Team	11.45	
8	Beatrice Utondu	Nigeria	11.53	

=== Final ===
Wind: -1.0

Rank	Lane	Athlete	Nation	Time
1st place, gold medalist(s)	2	Gail Devers	United States	10.82
2nd place, silver medalist(s)	3	Juliet Cuthbert	Jamaica	10.83
3rd place, bronze medalist(s)	6	Irina Privalova	Unified Team	10.84
4	5	Gwen Torrence	United States	10.86
5	4	Merlene Ottey	Jamaica	10.88
6	7	Anelia Nuneva	Bulgaria	11.10
7	8	Mary Onyali	Nigeria	11.15
8	1	Liliana Allen	Cuba	11.19

== See also ==
- 1990 Women's European Championships 100 metres (Split)
- 1991 Women's World Championships 100 metres (Tokyo)
- 1993 Women's World Championships 100 metres (Stuttgart)
- 1994 Women's European Championships 100 metres (Helsinki)
