= Trevaia Williams =

American sprinter and hurdler (born 1968)

Personal information
- Born: September 7, 1968 (age 58) Houston, Texas, United States

Sport
- Sport: Track and field
Medal record
Representing United States
World Indoor Championships
Silver medal – second place	1993 Toronto	4x400 m relay
Pan American Games
Silver medal – second place	1995 Mar del Plata	4x400 m relay
Summer Universiade
Bronze medal – third place	1993 Buffalo	400 m hurdles

Trevaia Williams-Davis (née Williams; born September 7, 1968) is an American sprinter and hurdler, who specialized in the 400-meter dash. She was a silver medalist in the 4 × 400 m relay at the 1993 IAAF World Indoor Championships, along with her teammates Terri Dendy, Dyan Webber, and Natasha Kaiser-Brown. She was the bronze medalist in the 400 m hurdles at the 1993 Summer Universiade. She married Terril Davis, another sprinter. They have two sons, Isaac and Jayden Davis. She exposed her sons to the sport through her work. For example, while coaching a track club at Eduprize, a charter school in Queen Creek, Arizona, Trevaia supported her sons to train with the other kids.

Williams was an All-American hurdler and heptathlete for the UNLV Rebels track and field team, finishing 3rd in the heptathlon at the 1991 NCAA Division I Outdoor Track and Field Championships and 3rd in the 400 m hurdles at the 1992 NCAA Division I Outdoor Track and Field Championships.
