= Hideyuki Takei =

Japanese pole vaulter (born 1970)

Medal record

Men's athletics

Representing Japan

Asian Championships
Gold medal – first place	1991 Kuala Lumpur	Pole vault
Gold medal – first place	1995 Jakarta	Pole vault

Hideyuki Takei (竹井 秀行, Takei Hideyuki; born 19 November 1970) is a Japanese former pole vaulter. He was twice champion at the Asian Athletics Championships, winning in 1991 and 1995. He represented his country at the 1991 World Championships in Athletics and represented Asia at the 1992 IAAF World Cup.

At national level, he won at the 1995 National Sports Festival of Japan, and was twice winner at the Japan Championships in Athletics (1992 and 1995).

His personal best jump is 5.57 metres, achieved in July 1994.

== International competitions ==
Representing Japan
Year	Competition	Venue	Position	Event	Notes
1991	Asian Championships	Kuala Lumpur, Malaysia	1st	Pole vault	5.25 m
1991	World Championships	Tokyo, Japan	7th (q)	Pole vault	5.45 m
1992	World Cup	Havana, Cuba	4th	Pole vault	5.30 m
1995	Asian Championships	Jakarta, Indonesia	1st	Pole vault	5.30 m

== National titles ==
- Japan Championships in Athletics
  - Pole vault: 1992, 1995
- National Sports Festival of Japan
  - Pole vault: 1995
