= Terril Davis =

American middle-distance runner (born 1968)

Personal information
- Born: April 21, 1968 (age 58)

Sport
- Sport: Track and field
Medal record
Representing United States
Pan American Games
| Silver medal – second place | 1991 Havana | 800m |

Terril Davis (born April 21, 1968) is a retired male middle-distance runner from the United States, who specialized in the 800-meter run. He competed in the 1980s and the early 1990s for his native country. He set his personal best in the men's 800 metres event (1:44.44) on 1992-06-24 at the US National Championships in New Orleans.

Davis ran for the Baylor Bears track and field team where he set a school record in the 800 m. He married UNLV Rebels track and field sprinter Trevaia Williams. His son Jayden Davis was an NCAA champion sprinter for the Arizona State Sun Devils track and field team.

== Competition record ==
| Year | Competition | Venue | Position | Notes |
|---|---|---|---|---|
| 1991 | USA Outdoor Track and Field Championships | New York City | 5th | 1:46.59 |
| 1991 | Pan American Games | Havana, Cuba | 2nd | 1:46.99 |
| 1992 | USA Outdoor Track and Field Championships | New Orleans, Louisiana | 5th | 1:44.44 |
| 1992 | IAAF World Cup | Havana, Cuba | 8th | 1:48.50 |
| 1993 | USA Outdoor Track and Field Championships | Eugene, Oregon | 5th | 1:46.24 |
| 1994 | USA Outdoor Track and Field Championships | Knoxville, Tennessee | 5th | 1:47.94 |
| 1995 | Pan American Games | Mar del Plata, Argentina | 8th | 1:51.21 |
