= 1993 European Cup (athletics) =

- Dates: 26–27 June (Super League); 12–13 June (First & Second League)
- Host city: Rome, Italy
- Level: Senior
- Type: Outdoor
- Events: 37

The 1993 European Cup was the 14th edition of the European Cup of athletics.

It was the first edition to use the term "Leagues" (Super League, First League, Second League) and the first to feature women's triple jump. The Super League Finals were held in Rome, Italy.

== Super League ==
Held on 26 and 27 June in Rome, Italy

=== Team standings ===
Men
Pos.	Nation	Points
1	Russia	128
2	Great Britain	124
3	France	123
4	Germany	119
5	Italy	112
6	Ukraine	97
7	Spain	76
8	Poland	65
9	Czech Republic	54

Women
Pos.	Nation	Points
1	Russia	141
2	Romania	102
3	Ukraine	97,5
4	Germany	96
5	Great Britain	91
6	France	75
7	Poland	62
8	Italy	55.5
9	Finland	44

The dissolved Soviet Union was replaced by Russia and Ukraine while Czechoslovakia was replaced by the Czech Republic, which resulted in 9 teams competing. As a result, three teams had to be relegated to the first league.

=== Results summary ===
==== Men's events ====
Event	Gold		Silver		Bronze	
100 m (Wind: +1.3 m/s)	Linford Christie; Great Britain	10.22	Aleksandr Porkhomovskiy; Russia	10.28	Daniel Sangouma; France	10.42
200 m (Wind: -0.9 m/s)	John Regis; Great Britain	20.38	Andrey Fedoriv; Russia	20.54	Robert Kurnicki; Germany	20.59
400 m	David Grindley; Great Britain	44.75; CR	Dmitriy Golovastov; Russia	45.65	Jean-Louis Rapnouil; France	45.91
800 m	Andrey Bulkovskiy; Ukraine	1:47.32	Andrea Benvenuti; Italy	1:47.63	Tom McKean; Great Britain	1:47.67
1500 m	Andrey Bulkovskiy; Ukraine	3:37.51	Fermín Cacho; Spain	3:38.09	Pascal Thiébaut; France	3:38.12
5000 m	Rob Denmark; Great Britain	13:30.02	Alessandro Lambruschini; Italy	13:30.96	Abel Antón; Spain	13:31.35
10,000 m	Thierry Pantel; France	28:02.71	Francesco Panetta; Italy	28:13.99	José Carlos Adán; Spain	28:16.19
3000 m steeplechase	Steffen Brand; Germany	8:17.77	Francesco Panetta; Italy	8:22.95	Thierry Brusseau; France	8:24.60
110 m hurdles (Wind: -0.2 m/s)	Colin Jackson; Great Britain	13.10; CR	Florian Schwarthoff; Germany	13.50	Dan Philibert; France	13.62
400 m hurdles	Stéphane Diagana; France	48.08	Olaf Hense; Germany	48.48	Oleg Tverdokhleb; Ukraine	48.70
4 × 100 m	Great Britain; Jason John; Tony Jarrett; John Regis; Linford Christie	38.53	France; Éric Perrot; Daniel Sangouma; Jean-Charles Trouabal; Bruno Marie-Rose	38.72	Russia; Pavel Galkin; Edvin Ivanov; Andrey Fedoriv; Aleksandr Porkhomovskiy	38.89
4 × 400 m	Great Britain; Du'aine Ladejo; Kriss Akabusi; John Regis; David Grindley	3:00.25; CR	Russia; Dmitriy Kliger; Dmitriy Kosov; Mikhail Vdovin; Dmitriy Golovastov	3:00.75	France; Jean-Louis Rapnouil; Pierre-Marie Hilaire; André Jaffory; Stéphane Diagana	3:00.94
High jump	Artur Partyka; Poland	2.30	Jean-Charles Gicquel; France	2.30	Roberto Ferrari; Italy	2.30
Pole vault	Rodion Gataullin; Russia	6.00; CR	Sergey Bubka; Ukraine	5.80	Javier García; Spain	5.70
Long jump	Giovanni Evangelisti; Italy	8.04w	Ángel Hernández; Spain	8.04w	Stanislav Tarasenko; Russia	7.93
Triple jump	Pierre Camara; France	17.46w	Jonathan Edwards; Great Britain	17.27	Ralf Jaros; Germany	17.18
Shot put	Aleksandr Bagach; Ukraine	20.15	Paolo Dal Soglio; Italy	19.79	Yevgeniy Palchikov; Russia	19.64
Discus throw	Lars Riedel; Germany	66.30	Dmitriy Shevchenko; Russia	63.96	Vladimir Zinchenko; Ukraine	62.42
Hammer throw	Sergey Litvinov; Russia	80.78	Christophe Épalle; France	76.08	Andrey Skvaruk; Ukraine	76.00
Javelin throw	Jan Železný; Czech Republic	89.84	Mick Hill; Great Britain	80.76	Andrey Shevchuk; Russia	79.16
WR world record | AR area record | CR championship record | GR games record | NR national record | OR Olympic record | PB personal best | SB season best | WL world leading (in a given season)

==== Women's events ====
Event	Gold		Silver		Bronze	
100 m (Wind: -0.3 m/s)	Irina Privalova; Russia	11.08	Marie-José Pérec; France	11.27	Zhanna Tarnopolskaya; Ukraine	11.29
200 m (Wind: +0.8 m/s)	Irina Privalova; Russia	22.30	Marie-José Pérec; France	22.30	Silke Knoll; Germany	22.89
400 m	Yelena Ruzina; Russia	51.54	Elsa Devassoigne; France	51.92	Linda Keough; Great Britain	52.14
800 m	Ella Kovacs; Romania	1:57.5	Lyubov Kremlyova; Russia	1:59.8	Yelena Storchovaya; Ukraine	2:00.1
1500 m	Vera Chuvashova; Russia	4:16.03	Violeta Beclea; Romania	4:16.36	Yvonne Murray; Great Britain	4:17.51
3000 m	Margareta Keszeg; Romania	8:51.88	Yelena Kopytova; Russia	8:52.27	Alison Wyeth; Great Britain	8:52.98
10,000 m	Viktoriya Nenasheva; Russia	32:33.46	Iulia Negura; Romania	32:36.05	Tamara Koba; Ukraine	32:39.50
100 m hurdles (Wind: +0.3 m/s)	Marina Azyabina; Russia	12.63	Jacqui Agyepong; Great Britain	13.17	Liliana Nastase; Romania	13.22
400 m hurdles	Sally Gunnell; Great Britain	53.73; CR	Anna Knoroz; Russia	54.42	Nicoleta Carutasu; Romania	54.94
4 × 100 m	Russia; Olga Bogoslovskaya; Natalya Voronova; Marina Trandenkova; Irina Privalova	42.79	France; Patricia Girard; Odiah Sidibé; Maguy Nestoret; Marie-José Pérec	43.01	Germany; Melanie Paschke; Silke Knoll; Bettina Zipp; Andrea Philipp	43.46
4 × 400 m	Russia; Yelena Golesheva; Yelena Ruzina; Vera Sychugova; Tatyana Alekseyeva	3:24.23	Ukraine; Lyudmila Koshchey; Aelita Yurchenko; Yelena Nasonkina; Lyudmila Dzhigalova	3:27.37	Germany; Karin Janke; Anja Rücker; Jana Schönenberger; Sandra Seuser	3:27.80
High jump	Alina Astafei; Romania	2.00	Heike Henkel; Germany	1.96	Katarzyna Majchrzak; Poland	1.92
Long jump	Heike Drechsler; Germany	7.02	Yelena Sinchukova; Russia	6.94w	Fiona May; Great Britain	6.73
Triple jump	Yolanda Chen; Russia	14.34w	Helga Radtke; Germany	14.05	Inessa Kravets; Ukraine	13.99
Shot put	Anna Romanova; Russia	19.43	Valentina Fedyushina; Ukraine	18.91	Stephanie Storp; Germany	18.85
Discus throw	Larisa Korotkevich; Russia	64.58	Larisa Mikhalchenko; Ukraine	63.04	Renata Katewicz; Poland	61.68
Javelin throw	Felicia Tilea; Romania	62.68	Karen Forkel; Germany	61.92	Yekaterina Ivakina; Russia	61.74
WR world record | AR area record | CR championship record | GR games record | NR national record | OR Olympic record | PB personal best | SB season best | WL world leading (in a given season)

== First League ==
First League was held on 12 and 13 June in Brussels, Belgium

Men
Pos.	Nation	Points
1	Sweden	112
2	Romania	99.5
3	Hungary	97
4	Bulgaria	94.5
5	Switzerland	87.5
6	Finland	86
7	Norway	72
8	Belgium	71.5

Women
Pos.	Nation	Points
1	Belarus	91.5
2	Spain	81
3	Switzerland	79
4	Czech Republic	78
5	Bulgaria	77.5
6	Norway	70
7	Belgium	67
8	Hungary	66.5

== Second League ==
The Second League was held on 12 and 13 June

=== Men ===
Held in Villach, Austria

Pos.	Nation	Points
1	Greece	125
2	Austria	107.5
3	Israel	78
4	Croatia	69.5
5	Slovenia	69.5
6	Cyprus	57.5
7	Turkey	52

Held in Copenhagen, Denmark

Pos.	Nation	Points
1	Denmark	72
2	Latvia	65
3	Estonia	62
4	Lithuania	58
5	Iceland	41

Held in Rotterdam, Netherlands

Pos.	Nation	Points
1	Belarus	98
2	Portugal	84
3	Netherlands	78
4	Slovakia	75
5	Ireland	48
6	Moldova	38

=== Women ===
Held in Villach, Austria

Pos.	Nation	Points
1	Austria	82
2	Slovenia	78.5
3	Greece	75
4	Turkey	49.5
5	Cyprus	37
6	Croatia	34

Held in Copenhagen, Denmark

Pos.	Nation	Points
1	Lithuania	70
2	Denmark	64
3	Latvia	53
4	Iceland	36
5	Estonia	30

Held in Rotterdam, Netherlands

Pos.	Nation	Points
1	Portugal	75
2	Sweden	70.5
3	Netherlands	69
4	Ireland	52
5	Slovakia	51.5
6	Moldova	38
