= Gordon McKee =

Gordon McKee may refer to:

- Gordon McKee (athlete), American track and field athlete
- Gordon McKee (politician), British Labour politician
