= Gao Han =

Chinese sprinter (born 1971)

Gao Han (Chinese: 高 寒; born 3 July 1971) is a Chinese former track and field sprinter who competed in the 100 metres. He holds a personal best of 11.26 seconds, set in 1992. Gao was the Chinese national champion in the event in 1992 and won a bronze medal at the 1993 East Asian Games behind Wang Huei-Chen and Xiao Yehua.

She represented China at the 1992 Summer Olympics, reaching the quarter-finals of the women's 100 m and running in the first round of the 4 × 100 metres relay with teammates Tian Yumei, Chen Zhaojing, and Xiao Yehua. Relay gold came later that year for the quartet at the 1992 IAAF World Cup.

== International competitions ==
Year	Competition	Venue	Position	Event	Notes
1992	Olympic Games	Barcelona, Spain	7th (q-finals)	100 m	11.76
1992	Olympic Games	Barcelona, Spain	10th (heats)	4 × 100 m relay	43.70
1992	IAAF World Cup	Havana, Cuba	1st	4 × 100 m relay	43.63
1993	East Asian Games	Shanghai, China	3rd	100 m	11.57
1993	East Asian Games	Shanghai, China	1st	4 × 100 m relay	44.23

== National titles ==
- Chinese Athletics Championships
  - 100 metres: 1992
