= 1993 IAAF World Indoor Championships – Women's 200 metres =

The women's 200 metres event at the 1993 IAAF World Indoor Championships was held on 13 and 14 March.

== Medalists ==
Gold	Silver	Bronze
Irina Privalova; Russia	Melinda Gainsford; Australia	Natalya Voronova; Russia

== Results ==
=== Heats ===
First 2 of each heat (Q) and next 4 fastest (q) qualified for the semifinals.

Rank	Heat	Name	Nationality	Time	Notes
1	3	Melinda Gainsford	Australia	23.16	Q, AR
2	3	Wendy Vereen	United States	23.32	Q
3	4	Natalya Voronova	Russia	23.42	Q
4	1	Lucrécia Jardim	Portugal	23.48	Q, NR
5	1	Jacqueline Poelman	Netherlands	23.51	Q
6	4	Sanna Hernesniemi	Finland	23.55	Q, =NR
7	2	Irina Privalova	Russia	23.57	Q
8	4	Dyan Webber	United States	23.70	q
9	2	Sisko Hanhijoki	Finland	23.72	Q
10	3	Marika Johansson	Sweden	23.82	q, NR
11	1	Merlene Frazer	Jamaica	23.85	q
12	1	Wang Huei-Chen	Chinese Taipei	24.13	q
13	2	Ekaterini Koffa	Greece	24.17	
14	3	Chen Zhaojing	China	24.25	NR
15	2	Shanti Govindasamy	Malaysia	24.34	NR
16	3	Marcia Richardson	Great Britain	24.50	
17	1	Éva Barati	Hungary	24.59	
18	1	Arely Franco	El Salvador	27.00	NR
	4	Cathy Freeman	Australia	DQ	
	2	Sabine Tröger	Austria	DNS	
	4	Karen Clarke	Canada	DNS	

=== Semifinals ===
First 2 of each semifinal (Q) and the next 2 fastest (q) qualified for the final.

Rank	Heat	Name	Nationality	Time	Notes
1	2	Irina Privalova	Russia	22.58	Q
2	1	Melinda Gainsford	Australia	22.83	Q, AR
3	1	Natalya Voronova	Russia	23.00	Q
4	1	Wendy Vereen	United States	23.07	q
5	2	Dyan Webber	United States	23.54	Q
6	1	Sanna Hernesniemi	Finland	23.56	q
7	2	Lucrécia Jardim	Portugal	23.63	
8	2	Jacqueline Poelman	Netherlands	23.70	
9	2	Merlene Frazer	Jamaica	23.83	
10	2	Sisko Hanhijoki	Finland	23.84	
11	1	Wang Huei-Chen	Chinese Taipei	24.43	
12	1	Marika Johansson	Sweden	24.58	

=== Final ===
Rank	Lane	Name	Nationality	Time	Notes
1st place, gold medalist(s)	5	Irina Privalova	Russia	22.15	CR
2nd place, silver medalist(s)	3	Melinda Gainsford	Australia	22.73	AR
3rd place, bronze medalist(s)	4	Natalya Voronova	Russia	22.90	
4	6	Sanna Hernesniemi	Finland	23.03	NR
5	1	Wendy Vereen	United States	23.34	
6	2	Dyan Webber	United States	23.53	
