= Athletics at the 1987 Summer Universiade – Women's 400 metres =

The women's 400 metres event at the 1987 Summer Universiade was held at the Stadion Maksimir in Zagreb on 13 and 15 July 1987.

== Medalists ==
Gold	Silver	Bronze
Denean Howard; United States	Lyudmila Dzhigalova; Soviet Union	Sandie Richards; Jamaica

== Results ==
=== Heats ===
Rank	Heat	Athlete	Nationality	Time	Notes
1	4	Sandie Richards	Jamaica	52.42	Q
2	2	Denean Howard	United States	52.45	Q
3	4	Maria Magnólia Figueiredo	Brazil	52.61	q
4	3	Lyudmila Dzhigalova	Soviet Union	52.77	Q
5	1	Sonja Fridy	United States	52.90	Q
6	3	Ronny Uibel	East Germany	53.14	q
7	1	Maria Usifo	Nigeria	53.20	q
8	3	Erzsébet Szabó	Hungary	53.25	q
9	2	Tatyana Ledovskaya	Soviet Union	53.28	
10	4	Patricia Walsh	Ireland	53.40	
11	2	Marzena Wojdecka	Poland	53.86	
12	3	Sharon Ellis	Australia	53.99	
13	3	Geraldine Shitandayi	Kenya	54.47	
14	1	Nicole Azar	Australia	54.54	
15	3	Esther Lahoz	Spain	54.90	
16	3	Roxanne Oliver	Puerto Rico	56.77	
17	1	Anne Purvis	Great Britain	57.23	
18	4	Letica Gracia	Mexico	57.38	
19	2	Waleska Ramos	Puerto Rico	57.79	
20	4	Moré Galetovic	Bolivia	58.30	
21	4	May Sardouk	Lebanon	1:01.98	

=== Final ===
Rank	Athlete	Nationality	Time	Notes
1st place, gold medalist(s)	Denean Howard	United States	51.07	
2nd place, silver medalist(s)	Lyudmila Dzhigalova	Soviet Union	51.32	
3rd place, bronze medalist(s)	Sandie Richards	Jamaica	51.42	
4	Maria Magnólia Figueiredo	Brazil	51.74	
5	Ronny Uibel	East Germany	51.93	
6	Maria Usifo	Nigeria	52.18	
7	Sonja Fridy	United States	52.43	
8	Erzsébet Szabó	Hungary	53.00	
