= Athletics at the 1991 Summer Universiade – Men's 5000 metres =

The men's 5000 metres event at the 1991 Summer Universiade was held at the Don Valley Stadium in Sheffield on 25 July 1991.

== Medalists ==
Gold	Silver	Bronze
John Mayock; Great Britain	David Evans; Australia; Peter Sherry; United States	

== Results ==
=== Heats ===
Rank	Heat	Athlete	Nationality	Time	Notes
1	1	John Mayock	Great Britain	14:01.41	Q, PB
2	1	Ryuji Takei	Japan	14:01.47	Q
3	1	James Farmer	United States	14:01.56	Q
4	1	Antonio Serrano	Spain	14:01.74	Q
5	1	Chris Weber	Canada	14:01.89	Q
6	1	Noel Berkeley	Ireland	14:02.19	q
7	1	Salvador Parra	Mexico	14:03.60	q
8	1	Khalid Khannouchi	Morocco	14:04.75	q
9	1	Paulo Ferreira	Portugal	14:10.56	q
10	2	Peter Sherry	United States	14:11.04	Q
11	2	Imre Berkovics	Hungary	14:11.72	Q
12	2	David Evans	Australia	14:12.22	Q
13	2	Jon Brown	Great Britain	14:12.63	Q
14	2	Guo Yigiang	China	14:15.33	Q
15	2	Nihat Yaylalı	Turkey	14:16.35	q
16	1	Jamie Harrison	Australia	14:18.08	
17	2	Mohamed Kamel Selmi	Algeria	14:19.67	
18	2	Hamid Sajjadi	Iran	14:23.31	
19	1	Azzedine Salkhri	Algeria	14:29.69	
20	1	Richard Lindroos	New Zealand	14:51.87	
21	2	Donnacha O'Mahoney	Ireland	14:57.07	
22	2	Kapkory Cheromoi	Kenya	14:58.66	
23	2	Terje Johnsen	Norway	15:12.16	
24	2	Godfrey Nuwagaba	Uganda	15:20.84	
25	2	Zouhair Naji	Lebanon	15:51.63	
26	1	Mohammad Fani	Iran	16:54.44	
27	1	J. M. C. Mugashe	Tanzania	17:12.61	
28	2	John Votaia	Solomon Islands	17:25.63	
29	1	Emmanuel Senzira	Rwanda	19:28.51	
	2	Alex Msuya	Tanzania	DNF	

=== Final ===
Rank	Athlete	Nationality	Time	Notes
1st place, gold medalist(s)	John Mayock	Great Britain	13:39.25	PB
2nd place, silver medalist(s)	David Evans	Australia	13:39.31	
2nd place, silver medalist(s)	Peter Sherry	United States	13:39.31	
4	Jon Brown	Great Britain	13:41.16	
5	Antonio Serrano	Spain	13:42.70	
6	Noel Berkeley	Ireland	13:43.63	
7	Imre Berkovics	Hungary	13:47.58	
8	James Farmer	United States	13:51.92	
9	Nihat Yaylalı	Turkey	13:52.35	
10	Chris Weber	Canada	13:54.23	
11	Khalid Khannouchi	Morocco	13:55.33	
12	Guo Yigiang	China	14:02.99	
13	Ryuji Takei	Japan	14:04.72	
14	Paulo Ferreira	Portugal	14:22.72	
	Salvador Parra	Mexico	DNS	
