= Athletics at the 1993 Summer Universiade – Women's 400 metres hurdles =

The women's 400 metres hurdles event at the 1993 Summer Universiade was held at the UB Stadium in Buffalo, United States on 16 July 1993.

== Results ==
Rank	Lane	Athlete	Nationality	Time	Notes
1st place, gold medalist(s)	2	Heike Meißner	Germany	56.10	
2nd place, silver medalist(s)	5	Debbie-Ann Parris	Jamaica	56.11	
3rd place, bronze medalist(s)	1	Trevaia Williams	United States	56.57	
4	6	Linda Kisabaka	Germany	57.18	
5	8	Kellie Roberts	United States	57.83	
6	3	Monika Warnicka	Poland	58.25	
7	4	Omolade Akinremi	Nigeria	58.47	
8	7	Michaela Colluney	Canada	1:00.61	
