= 1991 Asian Athletics Championships =

1991 Asian Championships
- Dates: October 19–23
- Host city: Kuala Lumpur, Malaysia
- Venue: Stadium Merdeka
- Participation: at least 17 nations

The ninth Asian Championships in Athletics were held in 1991 in Kuala Lumpur, Malaysia.

== Medal summary ==
=== Men ===
Event	Gold		Silver		Bronze	
100 metres (wind: 0.0 m/s)	Talal Mansour; Qatar	10.29	Chen Wenzhong; China	10.45	Khalid Jouma Ibrahim; Bahrain	10.56
200 metres (wind: -1.3 m/s)	Zhao Cunlin; China	20.75	Ibrahim Ismail Muftah; Qatar	20.96	Hiroki Fuwa; Japan	21.00
400 metres	Ibrahim Ismail Muftah; Qatar	45.66	Aktawat Sakoolchan; Thailand	46.52	Koji Ito; Japan	46.64
800 metres	Lee Jin-il; South Korea	1:51.42	Nadir Khan; Pakistan	1:51.68	Ismail Yousef; Qatar	1:51.70
1500 metres	Mohammed Sulaiman; Qatar	3:42.64	Kim Bong-yu^{[nb1]} South Korea	3:45.01	Nadir Khan; Pakistan	3:46.47
5000 metres	Mohammed Sulaiman; Qatar	14:03.35	Ahmed Ibrahim Warsama; Qatar	14:04.45	Wang Helin; China	14:04.68
10,000 metres	Hwang Young-Jo; South Korea	29:50.37	Wang Helin; China	29:57.26	Kim Jae-Ryong; South Korea	30:05.48
3000 metre steeplechase	Hamid Sajjadi; Iran	8:33.89	Gao Shuhei; China	8:34.32	Saleh Mohammed Habib; Syria	8:34.66 (NR)
110 metres hurdles (wind: -1.4 m/s)	Nur Herman Majid; Malaysia	14.04	Zheng Jinsuo; China	14.05	Toshihiko Iwasaki; Japan	14.18
400 metres hurdles	Yoshihiko Saito; Japan	50.46	Ghulam Abbas; Pakistan	50.77	Zid Abou Hamed; Syria	51.15
4 × 100 metre relay	China; Zhang Hong; Zhao Cunlin; Chen Wenzhong; Zheng Chen	39.20	Thailand; Seaksarn Boonrat; Niti Piyapan; Pongsak Wacharakupt; Visut Watanasin	39.26	Japan; Koji Ito; Masahito Horiuchi; Tetsuya Yamashita; Hiroki Fuwa	39.74
4 × 400 metre relay	Japan; Hidekazu Katsuki; Yoshihiko Saito; Masayoshi Kan; Koji Ito	3:05.22	Thailand; Yuttana Thonglek; Anucha Santirangsimant; Sarapong Kumsup; Aktawat Sakoolchan	3:05.81	Malaysia; Azhar Hashim; Vellabouy Samson; Mohamed Yazid Parlan; Nordin Mohamed Jadi	3:06.64 NR
20 kilometre road walk	Bu Lintang; China	1:31:36	Hideharu Fuchida; Japan	1:34:02	Suchá Singh; India	1:37:01
High jump	Lee Jin-Taek; South Korea	2.22	Shigeki Toyoshima; Japan	2.19	Phaitoon Hearnthong; Thailand	2.16
Pole vault	Hideyuki Takei; Japan	5.25	Ge Yun; China	5.10	Ku Chin-shui; Chinese Taipei	5.10
Long jump	Chen Zunrong; China	8.10	Masaki Morinaga; Japan	8.02	Nai Hui-Fang; Chinese Taipei	7.85
Triple jump	Chen Yanping; China	17.22	Zou Sixin; China	16.95	Marzouk Abdullah Al-Yoha; Kuwait	16.48
Shot put	Cheng Shaobo; China	18.11	Bilal Saad Mubarak; Qatar	17.78	Yuji Okano; Japan	17.65
Discus throw	Yu Wenge; China	62.20	Shakti Singh; India	53.26	Yuji Yamazaki; Japan	51.76
Hammer throw	Bi Zhong; China	69.90	Nobuhiro Todoroki; Japan	64.56	Waleed Al-Bekheet; Kuwait	60.74
Javelin throw	Zhang Lianbiao; China	81.52	Masami Yoshida; Japan	80.44	Kim Ki-Hoon; South Korea	76.32
Decathlon	Gong Guohua; China	7652	Cai Min; China	7573	Katsuhiko Matsuda; Japan	7364

- ^{nb1} Some English-language sources, such as GBR Athletics, erroneously state that Kim Bok-joo was 1991 Asian Championships runner-up in the men's 1500 m. Contemporary English and Korean sources indicate it was his similarly-named teammate Kim Bong-yu who achieved these feats.

=== Women ===
Event	Gold		Silver		Bronze	
100 metres (wind: -2.1 m/s)	Tian Yumei; China	11.54	Pei Fang; China	11.62	Wang Huei-Chen; Chinese Taipei	11.69
200 metres (wind: -2.0 m/s)	Chen Zhaojing; China	23.39	Wang Huei-Chen; Chinese Taipei	23.44	Xiao Yehua; China	23.48
400 metres	Shiny Wilson; India	53.46	Josephine Mary Singarayar; Malaysia	53.50	Kalawati "Kutty" Saramma; India	53.51
800 metres	Qu Yunxia; China	2:04.65	Shiny Wilson; India	2:05.18	Yumiko Tokuda; Japan	2:05.48
1500 metres	Qu Yunxia; China	4:26.01	Khin Khin Htwe; Myanmar	4:26.08	Kim Song-Hwa; North Korea	4:27.15
3000 metres	Zhong Huandi; China	9:10.27	Molly Chacko; India	9:14.07	Khin Khin Htwe; Myanmar	9:19.36
10,000 metres	Zhong Huandi; China	33:42.77	Lukose Leelamma; India	35:38.90	Marija Suryati; Indonesia	38:00.33
100 metres hurdles (wind: +0.5 m/s)	Zhang Yu; China	13.37	Naomi Jojima; Japan	13.63	Kim Sun-Jin; South Korea	13.77
400 metres hurdles	Huang Yanhong; China	57.29	Reawadee Srithoa; Thailand	57.35	Junko Hasegawa; Japan	59.37
4 × 100 metres relay	China; Pei Fang; Tian Yumei; Chen Zhaojing; Xiao Yehua	43.41 CR	Thailand; Wanna Popirom; Reawadee Watanasin; Ratjai Sripet; Pronpim Srisurat	44.86	Japan; Kaori Yoshida; Kazue Kakinuma; Toshie Kitada; Ayako Nomura	45.25
4 × 400 metres relay	India; Shiny Abraham-Wilson; Dhana Laksmi; Kutty Saramma; Ashwini Nachappa	3:33.50	China; Chen Zhaojing; Huang Yanhong; Qu Yunxia; Pei Fang	3:36.71	Thailand; Noodang Phimphoo; Sukanya Sang-nguen; Saleerat Srimek; Reawadee Srithoa	3:37.52
10,000 metre track walk	Li Jingxue; China	49:14.82	Tomoko Uchida; Japan	49:40.18	Ma Kyin Lwan; Myanmar	51:27.72
High jump	Yoko Ota; Japan	1.83	Lin Suh-Chi; Chinese Taipei	1.83	Jaruwan Jenjudkarn; Thailand	1.80
Long jump	Li Yong-Ae; North Korea	6.79 (NR)	Liu Shuzhen; China	6.66	Hiroko Okumura; Japan	6.29
Shot put	Huang Zhihong; China	17.51	Min Chunfeng; China	16.91	Aya Suzuki; Japan	15.22
Discus throw	Min Chunfeng; China	61.74	Aye Aye Nwe; Myanmar	48.48	Chu Hsui-Chen; Chinese Taipei	43.80
Javelin throw	Xu Demei; China	59.84	Lee Young-Sun; South Korea	55.06	Vijita P. Amarasekara; Sri Lanka	50.90
Heptathlon	Zhu Yuqing; China	6231	Ghada Shouaa; Syria	5425	Wang Shu-Hwa; Chinese Taipei	5388

== Medal table ==
* Host nation (Malaysia)

Rank	Nation	Gold	Silver	Bronze	Total
1	China (CHN)	24	11	2	37
2	Japan (JPN)	4	7	12	23
3	Qatar (QAT)	4	3	1	8
4	South Korea (KOR)	3	2	3	8
5	India (IND)	2	4	2	8
6	Malaysia (MAS)*	1	1	1	3
7	North Korea (PRK)	1	0	1	2
8	Iran (IRN)	1	0	0	1
9	Thailand (THA)	0	5	3	8
10	Chinese Taipei (TPE)	0	2	5	7
11	Myanmar (MYA)	0	2	2	4
12	Pakistan (PAK)	0	2	1	3
13	Syria (SYR)	0	1	2	3
14	Kuwait (KUW)	0	0	2	2
15	Bahrain (BHR)	0	0	1	1
15	Indonesia (INA)	0	0	1	1
15	Sri Lanka (SRI)	0	0	1	1
Totals (17 entries)		40	40	40	120

== See also ==
- 1991 in athletics (track and field)
