= Vera Chuvashova =

Russian middle-distance runner

Vera Chuvashova (Russian: Вера Чувашова; born 7 October 1959) is a Russian former middle-distance runner who competed in the 1500 metres. She set personal bests of 1:58.12 minutes for the 800 metres and 4:05.73 minutes for the 1500 m. She represented Russia at the 1993 World Championships in Athletics.

Chuvashova was twice national champion at the Soviet Indoor Athletics Championships, winning over 800 m in 1986 and in the 1000 metres in 1990. She was runner-up to Derartu Tulu in the 3000 metres at the 1992 IAAF World Cup. She topped the field in the 1500 m at the 1993 European Cup.

== International competitions ==
Year	Competition	Venue	Position	Event	Notes
1992	IAAF World Cup	Havana, Cuba	2nd	3000 m	9:08.30
1993	European Cup	Rome, Italy	1st	1500 m	4:16.03
1993	World Championships	Stuttgart, Germany	10th (heats)	1500 m	4:21.33

== National titles ==
- Soviet Indoor Athletics Championships
  - 800 m: 1986
  - 1000 m: 1990
