= 1993 IAAF World Indoor Championships – Women's 4 × 400 metres relay =

The women's 4 × 400 metres relay event at the 1993 IAAF World Indoor Championships was held on 13 March.

The Canadian team was disqualified for the leadoff runner Rosey Edeh stepping out of her lane. The team finished 4th before disqualification.

== Results ==
Rank	Nation	Athletes	Time	Notes
1st place, gold medalist(s)	Jamaica	Deon Hemmings, Beverly Grant, Cathy Rattray-Williams, Sandie Richards	3:32.32	NR
2nd place, silver medalist(s)	United States	Trevaia Williams, Terri Dendy, Dyan Webber, Natasha Kaiser-Brown	3:32.50	
	Canada	Rosey Edeh, Donalda Duprey, Alana Yakiwchuk, France Gareau	DQ	
	Russia	Marina Shmonina, Tatyana Alekseyeva, Yelena Andreyeva, Yelena Rusina	DQ	

- Russia originally won the gold in 3:28.90 but was later disqualified for doping by Marina Shmonina.
