= Dawnette Douglas =

Bermudian sprinter

Personal information
- Nationality: Bermudian
- Born: 21 July 1971 (age 54)

Sport
- Sport: Sprinting
- Event: 100 metres

Dawnette Douglas (born 21 July 1971) is a Bermudian sprinter. She competed in the women's 100 metres at the 1992 Summer Olympics.
