= Athletics at the 1991 Pan American Games – Men's 5000 metres =

Men's 5000 metres at the Pan American Games

The men's 5000 metres event at the 1991 Pan American Games was held in Havana, Cuba on 7 August.

== Results ==
Rank	Name	Nationality	Time	Notes
1st place, gold medalist(s)	Arturo Barrios	Mexico	13:35.83	
2nd place, silver medalist(s)	Ignacio Fragoso	Mexico	13:45.15	
3rd place, bronze medalist(s)	Antonio Silio	Argentina	14:02.72	
4	Jim Farmer	United States	14:03.93	
5	José Antonio Morales	Guatemala	14:05.82	
6	Keith Brantly	United States	14:18.72	
7	Marc Olesen	Canada	14:21.72	
8	Juan Ramón Conde	Cuba	14:27.90	
9	Policarpio Calizaya	Bolivia	14:28.24	
10	Linton McKenzie	Jamaica	14:37.13	
11	Ángel Rodríguez	Cuba	14:41.67	
12	Jason Bunston	Canada	14:48.82	
13	José Luis Molina	Costa Rica	14:59.25	
	Adauto Domingues	Brazil	DNS	
