= Daniel Ivanov =

Daniel Ivanov may refer to:

- Daniel Ivanov (long jumper) (born 1965), Bulgarian long jumper
- Aoiyama Kōsuke, or Daniel Ivanov (born 1986), Bulgarian sumo wrestler
