= Nadir Khan (runner) =

Pakistani middle-distance runner (born 1966)

Personal information
- Nationality: Pakistani
- Born: 10 June 1966 (age 60) Pakistani
- Height: 182 cm (6 ft 0 in)
- Weight: 61 kg (134 lb)

Sport
- Country: Pakistan
- Sport: Middle-distance running
Medal record
Men's athletics
Representing Pakistan
Asian Games
Bronze medal – third place	1990 Beijing	800 m
Asian Championships
Silver medal – second place	1991 Kuala Lumpur	800 m
Bronze medal – third place	1991 Kuala Lumpur	1500 m
South Asian Games
Gold medal – first place	1991 Colombo	1500 m
Gold medal – first place	1989 Islamabad	800 m
Silver medal – second place	1991 Colombo	800 m
Silver medal – second place	1989 Islamabad	1500 m

Nadir Khan (born 10 June 1966) is a Pakistani former Olympic middle-distance runner. He represented his country in the men's 1500 meters at the 1992 Summer Olympics. His time was a 3:44.96.

Khan's first global championship was at the 1991 IAAF World Indoor Championships, where he ran 1:52.08 in the 800 metres to set the Pakistani indoor record, which still stands as of 2024. Although he did not advance to the 1992 Olympic final, he did win international gold medals in the 800 m (at the 1989 South Asian Games) and 1500 m (at the 1991 South Asian Games). He also won two South Asian Games silver medals, another silver in the 800 m at the 1991 Asian Athletics Championships and bronze medals at both the 1990 Asian Games and 1991 Asian Athletics Championships.

== See also ==
- List of Pakistani records in athletics
- Athletics in Pakistan
- Pakistan at the Olympics
