= Trương Hoàng Mỹ Linh =

Vietnamese sprinter

Personal information
- Nationality: Vietnamese
- Born: 27 June 1969 (age 57)

Sport
- Sport: Sprinting
- Event: 100 metres

Trương Hoàng Mỹ Linh (born 27 June 1969) is a Vietnamese sprinter. She competed in the women's 100 metres at the 1992 Summer Olympics.

Linh was a former Vietnamese record-holder in sprints. She was called the "queen" (Vietnamese: nữ hoàng) of athletics during her career, coached by Nguyen Dinh Minh.

She was born in Ho Chi Minh City, attended Trưng Vương High School, and won several Vietnamese Athletics Championships titles from 1986 to 1995. She was the first Vietnamese track and field athlete to participate in major tournaments. As an athlete she was known for employing "strange" training methods, such as holding an umbrella while running for resistance training or wearing lead weights on her legs for strength training. She was criticized for "westernizing" by wearing different styles of clothing upon returning from international trips. She unexpectedly retired in 1995, at only 26 years old, due to injury.

Linh studied at the Ho Chi Minh City University of Foreign Languages and Information Technology. After her retirement from athletics, she first worked as an editor for Ho Chi Minh City Television. She later became the head of recruitment for Manulife before leaving that role in 2015.
