= Athletics at the 1987 Summer Universiade – Women's 4 × 400 metres relay =

The women's 4 × 400 metres relay event at the 1987 Summer Universiade was held at the Stadion Maksimir in Zagreb on 19 July 1987.

== Results ==
Rank	Nation	Athletes	Time	Notes
1st place, gold medalist(s)	United States	Sonia Fridy, Denise Mitchell, Rochelle Stevens, Denean Howard	3:27.16	
2nd place, silver medalist(s)	Soviet Union	Yelena Vinogradova, Tatyana Ledovskaya, Larisa Lesnykh, Lyudmila Dzhigalova	3:27.65	
3rd place, bronze medalist(s)	Nigeria	Sadia Sowunmi, Kehinde Vaughan, Airat Bakare, Maria Usifo	3:33.37	
4	Yugoslavia	Kornelija Šinković, Vesna Bajer, Andreja Bačnik, Slobodanka Čolović	3:35.37	
5	Romania	Mariana Stanescu, Paula Ivan, Mitica Junghiatu, Nicoleta Carutasu	3:38.92	
6	Australia	Nicole Azar, Sarah Collins, Sharon Ellis, Sue Alton	3:40.51	
7	Puerto Rico	Carmen Rivera, Roxanne Oliver, Sheilla George, Elizabeth Casillas	3:51.19	
