= Liudmyla Koshchey =

Ukrainian sprinter

Personal information
- Nationality: Ukrainian
- Born: 3 January 1968 (age 58)

Sport
- Sport: Sprinting
- Event: 4 × 400 metres relay
Medal record
Women's athletics
Representing Ukraine
European Cup
Silver medal – second place	1993 Rome	4 × 400 metres relay
Silver medal – second place	1996 Madrid	4 × 400 metres relay

Liudmyla Koshchey (born 3 January 1968) is a Ukrainian sprinter. She competed in the women's 4 × 400-metre relay at the 1996 Summer Olympics.
