= Dyan Webber =

American sprinter

Dyan Webber (born April 9, 1966) is an American sprinter. She was a silver medalist in the 4 × 400 m relay at the 1993 IAAF World Indoor Championships. She was a member of the track team at Texas Southern University, and was an alternate for the 4 × 100 m relay at the 1992 Olympics, in which her team won the gold medal. Her son, Corey Thompson, is an NFL linebacker.

== Competition record ==
Year	Competition	Venue	Position	Event	Time	Wind (m/s)	Notes
Representing United States
1992	IAAF World Cup	Havana, Cuba	5th	200 m	23.60	-0.3	
1992	IAAF World Cup	Havana, Cuba	7th	4 × 100 m relay	45.03	—N/a	
1993	IAAF World Indoor Championships	Toronto, Canada	2nd	4 × 400 m relay	3:32.50	—N/a	
1993	IAAF World Indoor Championships	Toronto, Canada	6th	200 m	23.53	—N/a	
