= Aktawat Sakoolchan =

Thai sprinter (born 1972)

Personal information
- Nationality: Thai
- Born: 8 September 1972 (age 53) Thailand
- Height: 1.79 m (5 ft 10 in)
- Weight: 64 kg (141 lb)

Sport
- Sport: Running
- Event(s): 400 metres, 4 × 400 metre relay
Medal record
Men's athletics
Representing Thailand
Asian Games
Silver medal – second place	1994 Hiroshima	4 × 400 m relay
Bronze medal – third place	1994 Hiroshima	400 m
Asian Championships
Silver medal – second place	1991 Kuala Lumpur	400 m
Silver medal – second place	1991 Kuala Lumpur	4 × 400 m relay
Southeast Asian Games
Gold medal – first place	1991 Manila	400 m
Gold medal – first place	1995 Chiang Mai	400 m
Gold medal – first place	1995 Chiang Mai	4 × 400 m relay

Aktawat Sakoolchan (Thai: เอกธวัช สกุลจันทร์; born 8 September 1972) is a retired Thai sprinter who specialized in the 400 metres and 4 × 400 metre relay. He represented his country at the 1992 Summer Olympics in both events, finishing 5th and 6th in his heats, respectively.

He won two silver medals at the 1991 Asian Athletics Championships in Kuala Lumpur, and then broke the 400 m national and Southeast Asian Games records at the 1995 Southeast Asian Games in Chiang Mai, recording a 46.05 second run. The records stood for 20 years before both were broken by Kunanon Sukkaew in 2015 with a 46.00 time.
