= Jerry Tarr =

American football player (born 1939)

No. 41
- Position: Wide receiver

Personal information
- Born: August 27, 1939 (age 87); Bakersfield, California, U.S.
- Listed height: 6 ft 0 in (1.83 m)
- Listed weight: 190 lb (86 kg)

Career information
- High school: Bakersfield (CA)
- College: Oregon
- AFL draft: 1962: 17th round, 130th overall pick

Career history
- Denver Broncos (1962)

Awards and highlights
- U of Oregon Athletic HOF; Oregon Sports HOF

Career statistics
- Games played: 14
- Receptions: 8
- Receiving yards: 211
- Receiving TDs: 2
- Stats at Pro Football Reference

Gerald LaVern Tarr (born August 27, 1939) is a former collegiate and professional American football player who played in one American Football League (AFL) season (1962) for the Denver Broncos. Tarr was also a successful college track and field athlete.

== Career ==
Tarr attended the University of Oregon, where he was a two-sport athlete in football and track. In track, Tarr was a member of Oregon's 4 x 110 yard relay team with Mike Gaechter, Harry Jerome, and Mel Renfro, which set a world record in 1962.

Tarr's main event, however, was the 120-yard hurdles. He was the first athlete to win back-to-back NCAA titles in the high hurdles in 1961 and 1962, and in doing so, helped Oregon win its first ever NCAA Men's Outdoor Track and Field Championship in 1962.

Like his relay mates Renfro and Gaechter, Tarr decided to play professional football rather than continue his track career. He played one season with the Denver Broncos of the AFL.

== Personal life ==
Tarr later became a probation officer in Las Vegas. His daughter Sheila Tarr won the 1984 heptathlon at the NCAA Division I Outdoor Track and Field Championships for the UNLV Rebels track and field team.

Tarr is a member of the University of Oregon Athletic Hall of Fame and the Oregon Sports Hall of Fame.

== See also ==
- Other American Football League players
