= Amber Welty =

American high jumper

Amber Marie Cnossen (née Welty; born April 24, 1967) is an American former track and field athlete who competed in the high jump. She represented the United States at the 1992 Olympic Games in Barcelona.

== Career ==
Welty was born in Salmon, Idaho, United States. Amber graduated from Twin Fall High School in Twin Falls, Idaho. Amber attended Idaho State University in Pocatello, Idaho. She was coached by Dave Nielsen, a world renowned coach and supporter of providing women an opportunity to compete in pole vaulting. Dave had the opportunity to coach the 1st official Olympic gold medalist in women's pole vaulting.

Amber's first opportunity to compete against the best in the United States at the NCAA Division 1 Championships came in 1987. She finished third at the NCAA Championships with a jump of 1.86 m.

In June 1988, Welty won the NCAA title with a career best of 1.92 m at the University of Oregon. Two weeks later, she finished third at the US National Championships, clearing 1.89 m. In July, at the Olympic trials in Indianapolis, she was fifth with 1.90 m. In 1990, she won her third NCAA medal, finishing second to Angie Bradburn, both clearing with a jump of 1.89 m.

In 1992, after ankle surgery (using the palmaris longus tendon from the wrist to transplant to the outside right ankle to make it stable) in October 1991 at the US National Championships in New Orleans, incorporating the Olympic trials, Welty finished second with 1.89 m, to earn Olympic selection, providing she could attain the qualifying standard of 1.92 m. She achieved this a week later at a meet in Boise. At the Barcelona Olympics, she cleared 1.88 m in the qualifying round to finish 27th overall.

Welty also represented the US at the 1992 IAAF World Cup in Havana, held a month after the Olympics. There she cleared 1.75 m to finish sixth.

== Achievements ==
- NCAA Champion (1988) – also 2nd (1990) & 3rd (1987)
- US National Championships – 2nd (1992), 3rd (1988)

Year	Competition	Venue	Position	Notes
Representing United States
1992	Olympic Games	Barcelona, Spain	27th (q)	1.88 m
1992	World Cup	Havana, Cuba	=6th	1.75 m
