= Athletics at the 1989 Summer Universiade – Women's 400 metres =

The women's 400 metres event at the 1989 Summer Universiade was held at the Wedaustadion in Duisburg with the final on 25, 26, and 27 August 1989.

The winning margin was 1.68 seconds which as of 2024 remains the only time the women's 400 metres was won by more than 1.5 seconds at these games.

== Medalists ==
Gold	Silver	Bronze
Ana Fidelia Quirot; Cuba	Jearl Miles; United States	Lyudmila Dzhigalova; Soviet Union

== Results ==
=== Heats ===
Rank	Heat	Athlete	Nationality	Time	Notes
1	2	Ana Fidelia Quirot	Cuba	52.50	Q
2	1	Celena Mondie	United States	52.76	Q
3	1	Lyudmila Dzhigalova	Soviet Union	53.05	Q
4	3	Jearl Miles	United States	53.15	Q
5	3	Sandie Richards	Jamaica	53.30	Q
6	1	Milena Saracheva	Bulgaria	54.10	Q
7	2	Karin Janke	West Germany	54.31	Q
8	3	Marjorie Bailey	Jamaica	54.40	Q
9	2	Yelena Vinogradova	Soviet Union	54.68	Q
10	3	Juliette Mato	France	54.73	Q
11	1	Francesca Carbone	Italy	55.30	Q
12	2	Florence Moulineau	France	55.56	Q
13	3	Brigitte Wielander	Italy	55.92	Q
14	2	Isabel Rodríguez	Spain	56.72	Q
15	3	Wang Hsin-hsin	Chinese Taipei	58.91	q
16	1	Peninnah Aligawesa	Uganda	1:05.09	Q
17	2	Woo Chui Ying	Hong Kong	1:08.37	
	1	Nancy McLeón	Cuba	DQ	

=== Semifinals ===
Rank	Heat	Athlete	Nationality	Time	Notes
1	2	Ana Fidelia Quirot	Cuba	50.01	Q
2	1	Lyudmila Dzhigalova	Soviet Union	51.89	Q
3	2	Jearl Miles	United States	51.96	Q
4	1	Sandie Richards	Jamaica	52.48	Q
5	1	Celena Mondie	United States	52.60	Q
6	2	Yelena Vinogradova	Soviet Union	52.84	Q
7	1	Karin Janke	West Germany	52.97	q
8	2	Florence Moulineau	France	53.70	q
9	1	Juliette Mato	France	54.15	
10	2	Milena Saracheva	Bulgaria	54.49	
11	2	Marjorie Bailey	Jamaica	54.58	
12	2	Brigitte Wielander	Italy	55.30	
13	1	Francesca Carbone	Italy	55.55	
14	1	Isabel Rodríguez	Spain	56.27	
15	1	Wang Hsin-hsin	Chinese Taipei	59.09	
16	2	Peninnah Aligawesa	Uganda	1:03.33	

=== Final ===
Rank	Athlete	Nationality	Time	Notes
1st place, gold medalist(s)	Ana Fidelia Quirot	Cuba	50.73	
2nd place, silver medalist(s)	Jearl Miles	United States	52.41	
3rd place, bronze medalist(s)	Lyudmila Dzhigalova	Soviet Union	52.69	
4	Karin Janke	West Germany	52.99	
5	Sandie Richards	Jamaica	53.03	
6	Celena Mondie	United States	53.08	
7	Yelena Vinogradova	Soviet Union	53.20	
8	Florence Moulineau	France	56.16	
