= Lyudmyla Dzhyhalova =

Soviet sprinter

Personal information
- Born: 22 January 1962 (age 64) Podilsk, Ukrainian SSR, Soviet Union

Sport
- Sport: Track and field
Medal record
Olympic Games
Representing the Soviet Union
| Gold medal – first place | 1988 Seoul | 4 × 400 metres |
Representing the Unified Team
| Gold medal – first place | 1992 Barcelona | 4 × 400 metres |
Representing the Soviet Union
World Championships
| Gold medal – first place | 1991 Tokyo | 4 × 400 metres |
European Championships
| Silver medal – second place | 1990 Split | 4 × 400 metres |
Summer Universiade
| Silver medal – second place | 1987 Zagreb | 400 m |
| Silver medal – second place | 1987 Zagreb | 4 × 400 metres |
| Bronze medal – third place | 1989 Duisburg | 400 m |
| Bronze medal – third place | 1989 Duisburg | 4 × 400 metres |
Goodwill Games
| Gold medal – first place | 1990 Seattle | 4 × 400 metres |
| Silver medal – second place | 1986 Moscow | 4 × 400 metres |
| Silver medal – second place | 1990 Seattle | 400 m |
European Cup
Representing the Soviet Union
| Gold medal – first place | 1987 Prague | 4 × 400 metres |
| Gold medal – first place | 1991 Frankfurt | 4 × 400 metres |
| Silver medal – second place | 1989 Gateshead | 4 × 400 metres |
Representing Ukraine
| Silver medal – second place | 1993 Rome | 4 × 400 metres |
IAAF World Cup
Representing the Soviet Union
| Bronze medal – third place | 1989 Barcelona | 4 × 400 metres |
Representing Unified Team
| Silver medal – second place | 1992 Havana | 4 × 400 metres |
| Bronze medal – third place | 1992 Havana | 400 m |

Lyudmyla Stanislavivna Dzhyhalova (also Lyudmila Dzhigalova, Ukrainian: Людмила Станіславівна Джигалова; born 22 January 1962) is a Ukrainian retired athlete who competed mainly in the 400 metres. She trained at Spartak in Kharkiv and represented the Soviet Union and the Unified Team.

She was born in Kotovsk, Odesa Oblast, Ukrainian SSR and competed for the USSR in the 1988 Summer Olympics, where she placed third in the 4 × 400 metres relay heats with the team, but was substituted by Tatyana Ledovskaya in the finals. Four years later Dzhigalova competed for the Unified Team in the 1992 Summer Olympics held in Barcelona, Spain in the 4 × 400 metres where she won the gold medal with her teammates Yelena Ruzina, Olga Nazarova and 400 m silver medalist Olga Bryzgina.

She received a four-year ban from athletics after failing a drugs test, having been positive for steroids in an out-of-competition test.

== See also ==
- List of doping cases in athletics
