= Tian Yumei =

Chinese sprinter (born 1965)

Medal record

Women's athletics

Representing China

Asian Games
Gold medal – first place	1990 Beijing	100 m
Gold medal – first place	1990 Beijing	4×100 m
Bronze medal – third place	1990 Beijing	200 m

Asian Championships
Gold medal – first place	1987 Singapore	4×100 m
Gold medal – first place	1991 Kuala Lumpur	100 m
Gold medal – first place	1991 Kuala Lumpur	4×100 m
Gold medal – first place	1993 Manila	100 m
Gold medal – first place	1993 Manila	4×100 m
Silver medal – second place	1985 Jakarta	4×100 m
Bronze medal – third place	1987 Singapore	100 m

Tian Yumei (Chinese: 田玉梅; born 28 December 1965) is a Chinese former track and field sprinter. Her personal best of 11.06 seconds for the 100 metres was set in 1997. She was a three-time Chinese champion in individual sprints.

She represented China in the 100 m at the Summer Olympics twice (1988, 1992) and also competed at the 1991 World Championships in Athletics. Her greatest achievements came at the regional level: she was a two-time gold medallist in the 100 m at the Asian Athletics Championships and the 100 m champion at the 1990 Asian Games. She also won a bronze medal in the event at the 1992 IAAF World Cup and the 200 metres bronze at 1990 Asian Games.

She enjoyed success with the Chinese 4×100 metres relay team from 1987 to 1993. She shared in the Asian title in 1987, 1991 and 1993, as well as the 1990 Asian Games title. The team competed at the 1992 Barcelona Olympics and took the gold medals at the IAAF World Cup the same year.

== Career ==
Born in Guangxi, she won her first international medals at the 1987 Asian Athletics Championships. She placed third in the 100 metres behind the more established Lydia de Vega and P.T. Usha but took the gold with the Chinese 4×100 metres relay team. She won the 100 m title at the Chinese Athletics Championships the following year and gained selection for the 1988 Seoul Olympics, where she was a quarter-finalist. The 1990 season saw her win a 100/200 metres double at the Chinese Championships and she ran in both events at the 1990 Asian Games. Hosted in Beijing, Tian became the Asian Games champion in the 100 m individual and relay events, as well as taking the bronze medal over 200 m. She continued to succeed on the regional stage the following year as she won the 100 m gold and relay title at the 1991 Asian Athletics Championships – the team of Pei Fang, Tian, Chen Zhaojing and Xiao Yehua set a championship record of 43.41 seconds for the event. She was chosen to compete at the 1991 World Championships in Athletics, but again did not progress beyond the quarterfinals.

Tian made her second Olympic appearance at the 1992 Barcelona Olympics. She reached the quarterfinals of the 100 m for a second time and also ran in the heats of the relay competition, alongside Gao Han, Chen Zhaojing, and Xiao Yehua. The quartet regrouped for the 1992 IAAF World Cup held in Havana and they claimed the women's relay time with a time of 43.63 seconds. Tian also won the individual bronze medal, running 11.44 seconds for third place behind home favourite Liliana Allen. The 7th Chinese National Games in September 1993 saw Chinese sprinting reach new heights: Tian set a personal best of 11.24 seconds for the 100 m but was beaten into second place by Liu Xiaomei, who broke the Asian record for the event with her run of 11.02 seconds. Tian also helped Guangxi to the relay National Games title. Three months later Tian defeated Liu in the 100 m at the 1993 Asian Athletics Championships to retain her regional title in a time of 11.36 seconds. The pair teamed up to secure the 4×100 m relay title for China for a fourth consecutive title.

Tian did not appear on an international podium again after 1993. Her last outing at a major event was the 1997 Chinese National Games. She set a 100 m personal best of 11.06 seconds to place third behind Liu and Li Xuemei (the latter setting the current Asian record of 10.79 seconds). The games was seriously marred by doping – many champions were stripped of their titles and the overall level of performances remain questionable to international audiences. Tian was a relay silver medallist in the National Games with Guangxi and this proved to be her last major medal.
