= Peter Sherry =

American long-distance runner

Personal information
- Nationality: American
- Born: August 22, 1968 (age 57) Chappaqua, New York

Sport
- Sport: Track, long-distance running
- Event(s): Mile, 5000 meters, 10,000 meters, half marathon, marathon
- College team: Georgetown
- Coached by: Frank Gagliano

Achievements and titles
- Personal best(s): 1500m: 3:46.10; Mile: 4:04.12; 3000m: 7:54.62; 5000m: 13:30.44; 10,000m: 28:36.66 ½ marathon: 1:04:22; Marathon: 2:20:38
Medal record
Men's athletics
Representing the United States
Summer Universiade
Silver medal – second place	1991 Sheffield	Men's 5000m

Peter Sherry (born August 22, 1968) is a former distance runner and professional athlete. He represented the United States at two consecutive Universiades, in 1991 and 1993. He won the 2003 Marine Corps Marathon.

== Career ==
=== High school ===
In his hometown of Chappaqua, Sherry ran cross country and track at Horace Greeley High School only in his senior year, having played baseball on a recreational basis up to that point. In his first season, he almost qualified for New York's state high school meet.

=== Collegiate ===
While a student at Georgetown, Sherry finished in tenth place overall in the men's race at the 1989 NCAA DI Cross Country Championships. He was the men's runner-up in the 5000 meters at the 1991 NCAA DI Outdoor Track and Field Championships. In a very rare tie, he finished in second place in the men's 5000 meters at the 1991 Summer Universiade in 13:39.31, exactly the same time recorded by Australian competitor David Evans.

=== Post-collegiate ===
Upon graduating from Georgetown, Sherry signed a professional contract with Adidas. He joined the Reebok Enclave racing team, coached by Frank Gagliano. He finished in 17th place in the men's 5000 meters at the 1999 USATF Championships in a time of 14:03.48. In the 2003 Marine Corps Marathon, he almost dropped out in the eighth mile due to a cramp, but felt better en route to win the race. Peter Sherry tore his hamstring in the second mile of the 2020 Boston Marathon, but ultimately completed the race in 7 hours and 40 minutes.

== Personal life ==
Sherry currently resides in Great Falls, Virginia, with his wife, Faith Sherry. He runs a sports massage therapy practice out of Commonwealth Chiropractic Center in Reston, Virginia.

== International competitions ==
Year	Competition	Venue	Position	Event	Notes
2003	North American Men's Marathon Relay Championships	Akron, United States	2nd	Marathon relay	2:07:13
