= Philip Barkutwo =

Kenyan long-distance runner

Personal information
- Nationality: Kenyan
- Born: 6 October 1966 (age 59)

Sport
- Sport: Athletics
- Event: Steeplechase
Medal record
IAAF World Cup
Gold medal – first place	1992 Havana	3000 m s'chase

Philip Barkutwo (born 6 October 1966) is a Kenyan former long-distance runner who specialised in the 3000 metres steeplechase. His personal best of 8:05.37 minutes, set in 1992, ranked him the third fastest ever at the time and still ranks within the all-time top thirty. He was the gold medallist at the 1992 IAAF World Cup.

He began to compete in the steeplechase in the late 1980s and rose to prominence in 1990 when he won the British AAA Championships title at the 1990 AAA Championships. He ranked in the top ten globally with a run of 8:14.93 minutes for third at the Memorial Van Damme. He was prominent on the circuit in the 1991 season, winning at the FBK Games before setting a new best of 8:11.25 minutes in Getxo. He was runner-up at the Athletissima meet and then defeated Moses Kiptanui at the Golden Gala in Rome. His winning time of 8:08.39 minutes moved him up to third on the all-time lists at that point, behind Kiptanui and world record holder Peter Koech. That was his peak that year, as he managed only fourth at the Herculis and Memorial Van Damme meetings.

He was again a top runner on the circuit in 1992, placing in the top three at the Herculis, Weltklasse Zürich, and ISTAF Berlin meets. He was victorious at the Memorial Van Damme then set a lifetime best at the Rieti Meeting, running 8:05.37 minutes to narrowly finish behind Moses Kiptanui. The time again ranked him second in the world after Kiptanui and maintained his place as third on the all time lists. In the sole international performance of his career, he represented Africa at the 1992 IAAF World Cup and came away with the gold medal in the steeplechase.

After 1992 he had a rapid decline in form with season's bests of 8:23.44 minutes in 1993 and 8:58.05 minutes in 1994. He retired from the sport shortly after.
