= Wendy Vereen =

American former track and field sprinter (born 1966)

Personal information
- Born: April 24, 1966 (age 60) Trenton, New Jersey, United States

Sport
- Sport: Track and field
Medal record
Representing United States
World Championships
Silver medal – second place	1993 Stuttgart	4×100 m relay
World Indoor Championships
Gold medal – first place	1993 Toronto	1600 m relay
IAAF World Cup
Bronze medal – third place	1989 Barcelona	4×100 m relay
Summer Universiade
Gold medal – first place	1987 Zagreb	4x100 m relay

Wenda "Wendy" Vereen (born April 24, 1966) is an American former track and field sprinter who specialized in the 100 and 200-meter dashes. She was the top ranked national runner in high school in 1983 and 1984. She set personal records of 11.17 seconds for the 100 m and 22.63 seconds for the 200 m.

Her career was highlighted by three relay medals – a 4×100-meter relay silver medal at the 1993 World Championships in Athletics, a medley relay gold medal at the 1993 IAAF World Indoor Championships, and a bronze at the 1989 IAAF World Cup. She twice represented the United States individually, competing in the 200 m at the IAAF World Indoor Championships in 1993 and 1995.

== Career ==
Vereen grew up in Trenton, New Jersey and took up track and field at high school at Trenton Central High School. She won the 200 m in the under-17's section of the 1982 USATF National Junior Olympic Track & Field Championships and was the American junior champion over 200 m in 1983 – her winning time of 23.22 seconds went unbettered until 1999. She was placed as number one in the 100 m and 200 m for high school girls in both 1983 and 1984 by Track & Field News. Her run of 11.17 seconds for the 100 m in 1983 placed her second on the all-time American high school lists after Chandra Cheeseborough.

Being one of the top ranked American high school sprinters, she gained an athletic scholarship to attend Morgan State University. While there she set four school records across individual and relay events. Among the eight NCAA All-American honors she earned while competing for the Morgan State Bears, she was runner-up in the 4×100-meter relay at the NCAA Women's Division I Outdoor Track and Field Championships in 1986 (future Olympic champion Rochelle Stevens was also part of the team). Vereen was named as a relay alternate for the 1984 American Olympic team but ultimately did not compete.

She was a frequent finalist at national level from the late 1980s onwards. At the USA Outdoor Track and Field Championships 200 m she was seventh in 1986, sixth in 1989, and eighth in 1990. At the 1993 USA Outdoor Track and Field Championships she was fourth in the 100 m (a career high national placing) and fifth in the 200 m. The following year she came eighth in 100 m and was again fifth over 200 m. She gained her first international medal at the 1989 IAAF World Cup, anchoring a 4 × 100 m relay team of Sheila Echols, Esther Jones and Dawn Sowell to a bronze medal behind East Germany and the Soviet Union.

Vereen's professional track career reached its peak in 1993. She achieved a best of 23.07 seconds indoors and gained her first individual international selection for the United States. At the 1993 IAAF World Indoor Championships she came fifth in the 200 m and also won a gold medal with the 1600-meter medley relay event. The team's winning time of 3:45.90 minutes was a world record for the non-IAAF-standard distance. She was chosen for the 4 × 100 m relay team for the 1993 World Championships in Athletics and the quartet of Michelle Finn-Burrell, Gwen Torrence, Vereen, and Gail Devers completed the race in 41.49 seconds. This was a new championship record, although the Russian women's team finished with the same time. Further analysis revealed the Russians as the winners and Vereen was awarded a silver medal with the American team. Vereen closed the season with a seventh-place finish in the 100 m at the 1993 IAAF Grand Prix Final.

Vereen had one further international performance, running in the 200 m heats at the 1995 IAAF World Indoor Championships, but was disqualified for a lane infringement. Her final top level appearance at the national level came at the 1996 United States Olympic Trials where she was a quarter-finalist in the 200 m.

Following the end of her athletic career, she settled in Indiana and was inducted into the Morgan State University Hall of Fame in 2014. Outside of track, she worked for the Department of Workforce Development, as well as taking up coaching with the Indiana Racing Cheetah Track Club. She married Troy Christopher and the pair had a daughter, Camille, around 2000.

== International competitions ==
Year	Competition	Venue	Position	Event	Notes
1989	IAAF World Cup	Barcelona, Spain	3rd	4 × 100 m relay	42.83
1993	World Indoor Championships	Toronto, Canada	5th	200 m	23.34
1993	World Indoor Championships	Toronto, Canada	1st	1600 m relay	3:45.90
1993	World Championships	Stuttgart, Germany	2nd	4 × 100 m relay	41.49
1995	World Indoor Championships	Barcelona, Spain	DQ (heats)	200 m	Lane infringement

== Personal records ==
- 100-meter dash – 11.17 seconds (1983)
- 200-meter dash – 22.63 seconds (1993)
- 200-meter dash indoor – 23.07 seconds (1993)
