= Marina Antonyuk =

Russian former track and field athlete

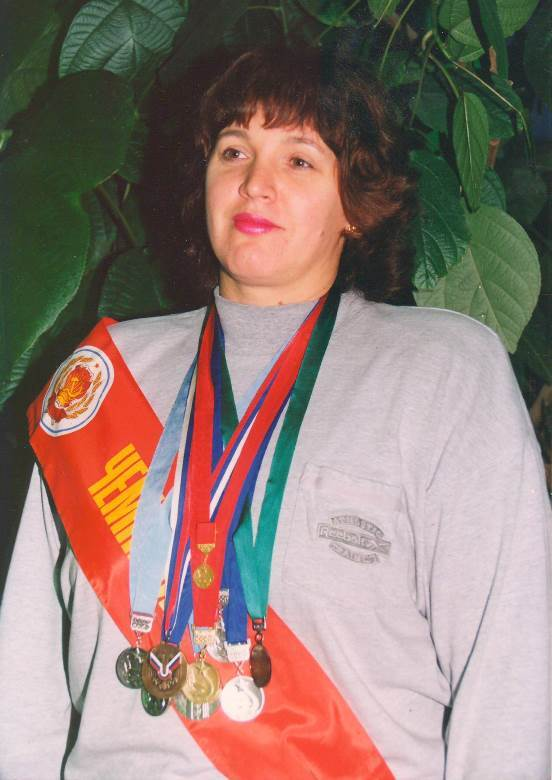
Marina Antonyuk

Marina Antonyuk (Russian: Марина Антонюк; born 12 May 1962) is a Russian former track and field athlete who competed in the shot put. She set a personal best of 20.60 m (67 ft 7 in) in 1986. She represented the Soviet Union at the 1991 World Championships in Athletics, finishing seventh, and at the 1990 European Athletics Championships, coming eighth. She was a silver medallist at the 1992 IAAF World Cup behind Cuba's Belsis Laza.

Antonyuk was the 1987 national shot put champion at the Soviet Athletics Championships.

== International competitions ==
Year	Competition	Venue	Position	Event	Notes
1990	European Championships	Split, Yugoslavia	8th	Shot put	18.82 m
1991	World Championships	Tokyo, Japan	7th	Shot put	19.12 m
1992	IAAF World Cup	Havana, Cuba	2nd	Shot put	17.98 m

== National titles ==
- Soviet Athletics Championships
  - Shot put: 1987
