= Gordon McKee (athlete) =

American former track and field athlete (born 1966)

Medal record

Men's athletics

Representing the United States

IAAF World Cup
Silver medal – second place	1992 Havana	Long jump

Gordon McKee (born 12 October 1966) is an American former track and field athlete who competed in the long jump. He was the silver medallist in the event at the 1992 IAAF World Cup, finishing behind home favourite Iván Pedroso in Havana. His personal record for the long jump was 8.28 m (27 ft 1 3/4 in).

In his sole other major international outing he competed in the qualifying round only at the 1993 IAAF World Indoor Championships. He was the national champion in the long jump at the USA Indoor Track and Field Championships in 1990. Track & Field News ranked McKee 9th in the world twice - first in 1990 and again in 1992.

Born to Frank McKee and Barbara McKee, he grew up in Texas with his sister, Jan. He attended Rockdale High School in Texas and excelled in track while there. He was inducted into the school's Sports Hall of Honor in 2013. He later competed for the Texas State Bobcats track and field team in the NCAA. McKee, his wife and his two sons lost their house to flooding after Hurricane Katrina in 2005.

== International competitions ==
Year	Competition	Venue	Position	Notes
1992	IAAF World Cup	Havana, Cuba	2nd	7.89 m
1993	World Indoor Championships	Toronto, Canada	20th (q)	7.46 m
