= UNLV Rebels track and field =

American college track and field team

- University: University of Nevada, Las Vegas
- Head coach: Carmelita Jeter
- Conference: MW
- Location: Las Vegas, Nevada
- Outdoor track: Myron Partridge Stadium
- Nickname: Rebels
- Colors: Scarlet and gray

The UNLV Rebels track and field team is the track and field program that represents University of Nevada, Las Vegas. The Rebels compete in NCAA Division I as a member of the Mountain West Conference. The team is based in Las Vegas, Nevada, at the Myron Partridge Stadium.

The program is coached by Carmelita Jeter. The track and field program officially encompasses four teams because the NCAA considers men's and women's indoor track and field and outdoor track and field as separate sports.

The UNLV men's track team was cut following the 1981 season. Both indoor and outdoor track were cut along with women's volleyball and tennis under a plan by then-President Leonard Goodall. The men's team was coached by Al McDaniels.

Heptathlete Sheila Tarr won the program's first individual title in 1984. Her father Jerry Tarr had won NCAA titles for Oregon in 1962.

== Postseason ==
=== AIAW ===
The Rebels have had 5 individual AIAW All-Americans finishing in the top six at the AIAW indoor or outdoor championships.

AIAW All-Americans
Championships	Name	Event	Place
1975 Outdoor	Beatrice Emodi	Long jump	5th
1976 Outdoor	Linda Cornelius	Pentathlon	4th
1977 Outdoor	Unknown	4 × 110 yards relay	2nd
1977 Outdoor	Unknown	4 × 110 yards relay	2nd
1977 Outdoor	Unknown	4 × 110 yards relay	2nd
1977 Outdoor	Unknown	4 × 110 yards relay	2nd
1977 Outdoor	Cecelia Branch	Sprint medley relay	3rd
1977 Outdoor	Nedra Washington	Sprint medley relay	3rd
1977 Outdoor	Emma Jean Major	Sprint medley relay	3rd
1977 Outdoor	Delores Lee Render	Sprint medley relay	3rd
1979 Outdoor	Lisa Thompson	100 meters	2nd
1979 Outdoor	Cecelia Branch	100 meters hurdles	3rd
1980 Outdoor	Ann Crump	Pentathlon	3rd
1981 Indoor	Lisa Thompson	60 meters	3rd

=== NCAA ===
As of August 2025, a total of 27 women have achieved individual first-team All-American status for the team at the Division I men's outdoor, women's outdoor, men's indoor, or women's indoor national championships (using the modern criteria of top-8 placing regardless of athlete nationality). No men achieved All-American status before the team was dropped by the 1982 season.

First team NCAA All-Americans
Team	Championships	Name	Event	Place	Ref.
Women's	1982 Outdoor	Lisa Thompson	200 meters	7th	
Women's	1982 Outdoor	Lisa Thompson	4 × 400 meters relay	6th	
Women's	1982 Outdoor	Sheila Polk	4 × 400 meters relay	6th	
Women's	1982 Outdoor	Vernecia Smith	4 × 400 meters relay	6th	
Women's	1982 Outdoor	Sonya Briscoe	4 × 400 meters relay	6th	
Women's	1983 Indoor	Lisa Thompson	55 meters	4th	
Women's	1984 Outdoor	Sheila Tarr	Heptathlon	1st	
Women's	1985 Indoor	Inger Peterson	55 meters	5th	
Women's	1985 Outdoor	Michelle Stewart	4 × 100 meters relay	8th	
Women's	1985 Outdoor	Michelle Matthias	4 × 100 meters relay	8th	
Women's	1985 Outdoor	Paula Ready	4 × 100 meters relay	8th	
Women's	1985 Outdoor	Inger Peterson	4 × 100 meters relay	8th	
Women's	1985 Outdoor	Sheila Tarr	Heptathlon	2nd	
Women's	1987 Indoor	Purdane Jackson	55 meters hurdles	6th	
Women's	1987 Indoor	Trena Hull	1000 meters	1st	
Women's	1987 Outdoor	Tanya Davis	4 × 100 meters relay	8th	
Women's	1987 Outdoor	Sonji Green	4 × 100 meters relay	8th	
Women's	1987 Outdoor	Carrie Franklin	4 × 100 meters relay	8th	
Women's	1987 Outdoor	Cheryl Cheeks	4 × 100 meters relay	8th	
Women's	1988 Outdoor	Tanya Davis	4 × 100 meters relay	8th	
Women's	1988 Outdoor	Carrie Franklin	4 × 100 meters relay	8th	
Women's	1988 Outdoor	Gretchen Jiles	4 × 100 meters relay	8th	
Women's	1988 Outdoor	Cheryl Cheeks	4 × 100 meters relay	8th	
Women's	1989 Indoor	Trevaia Williams	4 × 400 meters relay	8th	
Women's	1989 Indoor	Cheryl Cheeks	4 × 400 meters relay	8th	
Women's	1989 Indoor	Julie Harrison	4 × 400 meters relay	8th	
Women's	1989 Indoor	Sonji Green	4 × 400 meters relay	8th	
Women's	1989 Indoor	Maddete Smith	Long jump	2nd	
Women's	1989 Outdoor	Carrie Franklin	100 meters	8th	
Women's	1989 Outdoor	Maddette Smith	4 × 100 meters relay	4th	
Women's	1989 Outdoor	Carrie Franklin	4 × 100 meters relay	4th	
Women's	1989 Outdoor	Gretchen Jiles	4 × 100 meters relay	4th	
Women's	1989 Outdoor	Cheryl Cheeks	4 × 100 meters relay	4th	
Women's	1989 Outdoor	Carrie Franklin	4 × 400 meters relay	5th	
Women's	1989 Outdoor	Trevaia Williams	4 × 400 meters relay	5th	
Women's	1989 Outdoor	Julie Harrison	4 × 400 meters relay	5th	
Women's	1989 Outdoor	Cheryl Cheeks	4 × 400 meters relay	5th	
Women's	1990 Outdoor	Maddette Smith	Long jump	6th	
Women's	1990 Outdoor	Trevaia Williams	Heptathlon	6th	
Women's	1991 Indoor	Shunta Rose	Long jump	3rd	
Women's	1991 Outdoor	Trevaia Williams	Heptathlon	3rd	
Women's	1992 Indoor	Zundra Feagin	200 meters	4th	
Women's	1992 Indoor	Shunta Rose	Long jump	4th	
Women's	1992 Outdoor	Crystal Irving	400 meters	4th	
Women's	1992 Outdoor	Trevaia Williams	400 meters hurdles	3rd	
Women's	1992 Outdoor	Zundra Feagin	4 × 100 meters relay	6th	
Women's	1992 Outdoor	Crystal Irving	4 × 100 meters relay	6th	
Women's	1992 Outdoor	Shunta Rose	4 × 100 meters relay	6th	
Women's	1992 Outdoor	Trevaia Williams	4 × 100 meters relay	6th	
Women's	1992 Outdoor	Shunta Rose	Long jump	4th	
Women's	1993 Indoor	Crystal Irving	400 meters	2nd	
Women's	1994 Indoor	Jean Fletcher	800 meters	6th	
Women's	1994 Indoor	Latasha Prothro	4 × 400 meters relay	7th	
Women's	1994 Indoor	Latricia Dendy	4 × 400 meters relay	7th	
Women's	1994 Indoor	Cheryl Allen	4 × 400 meters relay	7th	
Women's	1994 Indoor	Jean Fletcher	4 × 400 meters relay	7th	
Women's	1994 Outdoor	Judy Fraser	400 meters	8th	
Women's	1994 Outdoor	Cheryl Allen	4 × 400 meters relay	5th	
Women's	1994 Outdoor	Latasha Prothro	4 × 400 meters relay	5th	
Women's	1994 Outdoor	Jean Fletcher	4 × 400 meters relay	5th	
Women's	1994 Outdoor	Judy Fraser	4 × 400 meters relay	5th	
Women's	1997 Indoor	Alicis Tyson	200 meters	7th	
Women's	1997 Outdoor	Hydiane Harper	200 meters	7th	
Women's	1997 Outdoor	Donielle Twitty	4 × 100 meters relay	5th	
Women's	1997 Outdoor	Alicia Tyson	4 × 100 meters relay	5th	
Women's	1997 Outdoor	Dahlia Smith	4 × 100 meters relay	5th	
Women's	1997 Outdoor	Hydiane Harper	4 × 100 meters relay	5th	
Women's	1999 Indoor	Jessica Marable	Shot put	8th	
Women's	1999 Outdoor	Jessica Marable	Shot put	8th	
Women's	2000 Outdoor	Michele Davis	200 meters	4th	
Women's	2000 Outdoor	Michele Davis	400 meters	7th	
Women's	2002 Indoor	Michele Davis	200 meters	8th	
Women's	2002 Indoor	Michele Davis	400 meters	6th	
Women's	2002 Outdoor	Michele Davis	400 meters	6th	
Women's	2002 Outdoor	Nickeisha Charles	400 meters	8th	
Women's	2004 Outdoor	Christine Spence	400 meters hurdles	7th	
Women's	2005 Indoor	Christine Spence	Pentathlon	8th	
Women's	2005 Outdoor	Christine Spence	400 meters hurdles	7th	
Women's	2005 Outdoor	Christine Spence	High jump	6th	
Women's	2006 Indoor	Ashley Owens	60 meters	2nd	
Women's	2011 Outdoor	Amanda Bingson	Hammer throw	4th	
Women's	2011 Outdoor	Chelsea Cassulo	Hammer throw	5th	
Women's	2012 Indoor	Amanda Bingson	Weight throw	7th	
Women's	2012 Outdoor	Amanda Bingson	Hammer throw	3rd	
Women's	2017 Outdoor	Kaysee Pilgrim	High jump	3rd	
Women's	2019 Indoor	Destiny Smith-Barnett	60 meters	4th	
Women's	2019 Outdoor	Avi' Tal Wilson-Perteete	800 meters	3rd	
Women's	2021 Outdoor	Avi' Tal Wilson-Perteete	800 meters	7th	
Women's	2023 Indoor	Rosa Santana	Shot put	3rd	
Women's	2023 Outdoor	Rosa Santana	Shot put	3rd	

== See also ==
- Category:UNLV Rebels men's track and field athletes (1)
- Category:UNLV Rebels women's track and field athletes (9)
