= Xiao Yehua =

Chinese sprinter (born 1971)

Medal record

Women's athletics

Representing China

Asian Championships
Gold medal – first place	1991 Kuala Lumpur	4×100 m
Gold medal – first place	1995 Jakarta	4×100 m
Bronze medal – third place	1991 Kuala Lumpur	200 m

IAAF World Cup
Gold medal – first place	1992 Havana	4×100 m

East Asian Games
Gold medal – first place	1993 Shanghai	4×100 m
Silver medal – second place	1993 Shanghai	100 m

Xiao Yehua (Chinese: 肖業華; born 6 November 1971 in Dahua) is a Chinese former track and field sprinter. Her personal best for the 100 metres was 11.23 seconds, set in 1992. She was a two-time Chinese champion over the 100 m (1992 and 1995).

She was the 200 m bronze medallist at the 1991 Asian Athletics Championships and the 100 m silver medallist at the 1993 East Asian Games. Most of her success came with the Chinese 4×100 metres relay team: she represented China at the 1992 Summer Olympics in the relay, won the Asian title in 1991, the 1992 IAAF World Cup relay gold medal, and the 1993 East Asian Games title.

== Career ==
Xiao won her first international medals at the 1990 Asian Junior Athletics Championships, where she was 100 m runner-up behind compatriot Wang Lei and shared in the 4×100 metres relay gold medal. She was quickly elevated to the senior team following a 100 m win at the 1991 Chinese Athletics Championships. At the 1991 Asian Athletics Championships she was the 200 metres bronze medallist and anchored the China relay team including Pei Fang, Tian Yumei and Chen Zhaojing to a championship record time of 43.41 seconds to win the 4×100 m relay title.

At the start of 1992 she achieved a personal best of 11.23 seconds for the 100 m. This earned her selection for the 1992 Barcelona Olympics, where she was eliminated in the quarter-final round. She also ran in the heats stage of the relay with the Chinese team. Xiao was also present in the relay team at the 1992 IAAF World Cup where an all-Chinese team (Gao Han, Tian, Chen, Xiao) represented Asia and won the gold medals in a time of 43.63 seconds.

The following year she was 100 m runner-up to Taiwan's Wang Huei-chen at the 1993 East Asian Games but managed to top the podium in the relay race. Her other major outing that year was the 7th Chinese National Games, where she failed to medal individually but won the relay title with fellow Guangxi runner Tian, Huang Mei and Ou Yanlan. In 1995 she won her second and final Chinese 100 m title. She continued to compete at the national level until 1998 but did not win any medals over this period.
