= Jim Farmer (runner) =

American long-distance runner

Personal information
- Nationality: American
- Born: August 14, 1965 (age 61) Raleigh, North Carolina

Sport
- Sport: Track, long-distance running
- Event: 5000 meters
- College team: North Carolina Tar Heels

Achievements and titles
- Personal best: 5000m: 13:32.61
Medal record
Men's athletics
Representing the United States
IAAF World Cup
Bronze medal – third place	1992 Havana	5000m

James Farmer (born August 14, 1965) is an American former long-distance runner. His greatest achievement was a bronze medal in the 5000-meter run for the United States at the 1992 IAAF World Cup.

== Running career ==
=== High school ===
Farmer attended Broughton High School of Raleigh, North Carolina. On May 27, 1983, he won North Carolina's state high school championships in the boys' 1600 meters with a time of 4:11.0. In the same meet, he placed fifth in the boys' 3200 meters in a time of 9:24.5.

=== Collegiate ===
Farmer attended University of North Carolina. In 1987, he ran his collegiate best result in the 5000 meters with a time of 13:50.10. In 1988, he set the school record in the indoor 3000 meters at 7:53.32.

=== Post-collegiate ===
His best national finish came at the 1988 USA Cross Country Championships where as a relative unknown he pushed Pat Porter – who had had five consecutive victories – in the latter stages of race and ultimately ended as the national runner-up. He finished in last place in the men's 5000 meters at the 1991 Summer Universidate. Later that summer, he finished in fourth in the men's 5000 meters at the 1991 Pan American Games. In 1992, he finished in third place in the men's 5000 meters at the 1992 IAAF World Cup.
