= Simon Fairbrother =

British former middle-distance runner

Medal record

Men's athletics

Representing Great Britain

IAAF World Cup
Bronze medal – third place	1992 Havana	1500 m

Simon Fairbrother (born 28 March 1968) is a British former middle-distance runner who specialised in the 1500 metres. His personal best for the event was 3:38.64 minutes, set in 1992, and he also set a mile run best of 3:56.83 minutes.

He was a one-time champion at the UK Athletics Championships, winning in 1991, and was a close runner-up to Curtis Robb in 1993. In his sole major international performance he won a bronze medal for Great Britain at the 1992 IAAF World Cup held in Havana, unexpectedly holding out against Europe's runner Fermín Cacho, who had won Olympic gold the previous month. At county level, he represented Middlesex as part of Enfield and Haringey Athletic Club in the early and mid 1990s.
