= Charmaine Crooks =

Canadian athlete and administrator (born 1962)

Charmaine Crooks CM, OLY
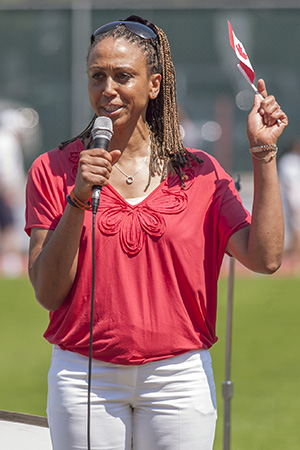
- Crooks in 2013

36th President of the Canadian Soccer Association
- In office March 1, 2023 – June 1, 2024
- Preceded by: Nick Bontis
- Succeeded by: Peter Augruso

Personal details
- Born: August 8, 1962 (age 64) Mandeville, Jamaica
- Education: University of Texas at El Paso
- Sports career
- Nationality: Canadian
- Height: 1.75 m (5 ft 9 in)
- Weight: 58 kg (128 lb)
- Sport: Running
- Events: 400 metres, 800 metres
Medal record
Women's athletics
Representing Canada
Olympic Games
Silver medal – second place	1984 Los Angeles	4x400 m relay
Commonwealth Games
Gold medal – first place	1982 Brisbane	4x400 m relay
Gold medal – first place	1986 Edinburgh	4x400 m relay
Silver medal – second place	1994 Victoria	800 m
Bronze medal – third place	1994 Victoria	4x400 m relay
Pan American Games
Gold medal – first place	1983 Caracas	400 m
Silver medal – second place	1983 Caracas	4x400 m relay
Silver medal – second place	1987 Indianapolis	4x400 m relay
Francophone Games
Silver medal – second place	1989 Casablanca	400 m
Silver medal – second place	1989 Casablanca	4x400 m relay
Pan American Junior Athletics Championships
Gold medal – first place	1980 Sudbury	400 m
Silver medal – second place	1980 Sudbury	4x400 m relay
Representing Americas
World Cup
Bronze medal – third place	1981 Rome	4x400 m relay
Gold medal – first place	1989 Barcelona	4x400 m relay
Silver medal – second place	1992 Havana	400 m
Gold medal – first place	1992 Havana	4x400 m relay

Charmaine Crooks (born August 8, 1962), is a Canadian businesswoman, sports executive, and retired sprinter and middle-distance runner.

Crooks was born in Mandeville, Jamaica, but represented Canada for close to 20 years in athletics. She was a five-time Olympian, winning silver and setting a national record of 3:21.21 in the 4 x 400 metres relay with her teammates Jillian Richardson, Molly Killingbeck, and Marita Payne. The first Canadian woman to run 800 metres in under two minutes, Crooks also won gold medals at the Pan American, Commonwealth, World Student Games, and World Cup. In 1996, she had the honour of being Canada's flag bearer at the opening ceremonies of the Atlanta Centennial Olympic Games. She is the fifth child with five sisters and three brothers.

== Biography ==
Crooks was born in Mandeville, Jamaica and moved to Toronto, Canada at the age of six. Crooks attended Winona Public elementary school and West Toronto Secondary School, where she participated in athletics. In 1979 and 1980, Crooks was Ontario high school champion in the 400 metres. Crooks attended the University of Texas-El Paso on an athletic scholarship and was named 'All-American' six times.

Crooks represented Canada for almost 20 years in athletics. Crooks participated in five Olympic Games. One highlight was the silver medal at the 1984 Summer Olympics in Los Angeles in the 4 × 400 m relay.

After retiring from active competition, Crooks moved into sports administration. Since 1994, Crooks is the president and founder of NGU Consultants, a sports marketing, management and corporate consulting company. She is also a keynote speaker, appearing at national and international conferences, corporate meetings and retreats and speaking on topics ranging from team building, leadership, inspiration and the Olympic Movement.

Crooks was elected to the International Olympic Committee (IOC) Athletes Commission in 1996 and was elected as a full voting member of the IOC from 2000 to 2004. She continues to serve on the IOC Athletes' Commission, has been a member of the IOC Press Commission since 2001, and was a founding member of the independent IOC Ethics Commission.

As an elected member of the executive board of the Canadian Olympic Committee (COC), Crooks is Chair of Olympians Canada (alumni body of Olympians) and the COC's Awards and Recognition/Hall of Fame Committee. As one of the original 2010 Olympic bid team members (since 1998) she is also one of twenty directors for the Vancouver Organizing Committee for the 2010 Olympic and Paralympic Winter Games (VANOC), and served on both the VANOC Governance and Strategic Communications Committee.

From 2003 to 2011, Crooks was elected by her peers to serve on the executive board of the alumni body of Olympians, the World Olympians Association (WOA) and was a WOA Vice President. She was the founding and first Chair of the PASO Athletes' Commission. Crooks is a founding member and past member of the International Board of Directors for Right to Play, an athlete-driven international humanitarian organization that uses sports to encourage the development of youth in disadvantaged areas.

Crooks is a current board member of the Canucks Autism Network (CAN) and has been a longstanding honorary member of Big Sisters of the Lower Mainland since 2000. She is also a member of FIFA's Organizing Committee for Competitions. In 2006, she was awarded the Women and Sport Trophy for Canada/America by the International Olympic Committee.

Crooks was named vice president of Canada Soccer on May 1, 2021. She was awarded the Brian Budd Award in May 2022 and was given the Order of Canada in December 2022. On March 1, 2023, she was named interim president of Canada Soccer.
