= Myra Mayberry-Wilkinson =

Puerto Rican sprinter

Personal information
- Nationality: Puerto Rican
- Born: 5 May 1965 (age 60)
- Height: 1.70 m (5 ft 7 in)
- Weight: 58 kg (128 lb)

Sport
- Sport: Sprinting
- Event: 100 metres

Myra Mayberry-Wilkinson (born 5 May 1965) is a Puerto Rican sprinter. She competed in the 100 metres at the 1992 Summer Olympics and the 1996 Summer Olympics.

Competing for the USC Trojans track and field team, Mayberry-Wilkinson won the 1987 NCAA Division I Outdoor Track and Field Championships in the 4 × 400 m.
