= Christine Toonstra =

Dutch runner

Personal information
- Born: 22 June 1966 (age 60) Amsterdam, Netherlands

Sport
- Sport: Track and field

Christine Elizabeth Toonstra (born 22 June 1966) is a retired long-distance runner from the Netherlands, who represented her native country at the 1992 Summer Olympics in Barcelona, Spain. There she finished in eleventh place in the women's 10,000 metres event. She is a one-time national champion in the women's 5,000 metres. On top of this, between 1988 and 1996, she assembled five national titles altogether in various other events.
