= 1992 IAAF World Cup =

International track and field sporting event

The 6th IAAF World Cup in Athletics was an international track and field sporting event sponsored by the International Association of Athletics Federations, held on September 25–27, 1992, at the Estadio Panamericano in Havana, Cuba.

== Overall results ==
=== Men ===
Pos.	Team	Result
1	Africa	115
2	Great Britain	103
3	Europe	99
4	Americas	92
5	United States	90
6	Unified Team	84
7	Asia	80
8	Oceania	45

=== Women ===
Pos.	Team	Result
1	Unified Team	102
2	Europe	94
3	Americas	79
3	United States	79
5	Germany	74
6	Africa	70
7	Asia	69
8	Oceania	40

== Results summary ==
=== Men ===
Event	Gold		Silver		Bronze	
100 metres	Linford Christie (GBR); Great Britain	10.21	Olapade Adeniken (NGR); Africa	10.26	Calvin Smith (USA); United States	10.33
200 metres	Robson da Silva (BRA); Americas	20.56	Linford Christie (GBR); Great Britain	20.72	Jeff Williams (USA); United States	20.75
400 metres	Sunday Bada (NGR); Africa	44.99	Mark Richardson (GBR); Great Britain	45.86	Charles Jenkins (USA); United States	46.10
800 metres	David Sharpe (GBR); Great Britain	1:46.06	William Tanui (KEN); Africa	1:46.14	Andrea Benvenuti (ITA); Europe	1:46.53
1500 metres	Mohamed Suleiman (QAT)} Asia	3:38.37	Jonah Birir (KEN); Africa	3:40.25	Simon Fairbrother (GBR); Great Britain	3:40.30
5000 metres	Fita Bayisa (ETH); Africa	13:41.23	Arturo Barrios (MEX); Americas	13:25.39	Jim Farmer (USA); United States	14:02.90
10,000 metres	Addis Abebe (ETH); Africa	28:44.38	Antonio Serrano (ESP); Europe	28:54.38	Mikhail Dasko (RUS); Unified Team	29:00.26
110 metre hurdles	Colin Jackson (GBR); Great Britain	13.07	Sergey Usov (UZB); Unified Team	13.55	Emilio Valle (CUB); Americas	13.69
400 metre hurdles	Samuel Matete (ZAM); Africa	48.88	Jon Ridgeon (GBR); Great Britain	49.01	Stéphane Diagana (FRA); Europe	49.34
3000 metre steeplechase	Philip Barkutwo (KEN); Africa	8:26.81	William Van Dijck (BEL); Europe	8:32.06	Shaun Creighton (AUS); Oceania	8:33.79
4 × 100 metre relay	United States; Bryan Bridgewater; Kevin Braunskill; Calvin Smith; Jeff Williams	38.48	Americas; Andrés Simón; Joel Lamela; Joel Isasi; Robson da Silva	38.51	Africa; John Myles-Mills; Olapade Adeniken; Oluyemi Kayode; Sanusi Turay	39.08
4 × 400 metre relay	Africa; Benyounés Lahlou; Samuel Matete; Simon Kemboi; Sunday Bada	3:02.14	Americas; Lázaro Martínez; Devon Morris; Troy Douglas; Norberto Téllez	3:02.95	Great Britain; Du'aine Ladejo; Jon Ridgeon; Allyn Condon; Mark Richardson	3:03.95
High jump	Yuriy Sergiyenko (UKR); Unified Team	2.29	Javier Sotomayor (CUB); Americas	2.26	Brendan Reilly (GBR); Great Britain	2.26
Pole vault	Igor Potapovich (KAZ); Unified Team	5.60	Philippe Collet (FRA); Europe	5.40	Okkert Brits (RSA); Africa	5.30
Long jump	Iván Pedroso (CUB); Americas	7.97	Gordon McKee (USA); United States	7.89	Chen Zunrong (CHN); Asia	7.84
Triple jump	Jonathan Edwards (GBR); Great Britain	17.34	Frank Rutherford (BAH); Americas	17.06	Toussaint Rabenala (MAD); Africa	17.03
Shot put	Mike Stulce (USA); United States	21.34	Sergey Nikolayev (RUS); Unified Team	20.14	Werner Günthör (SUI); Europe	19.75
Discus throw	Anthony Washington (USA); United States	64.86	Roberto Moya (CUB); Americas	63.66	Yu Wenge (CHN); Asia	63.06
Hammer throw	Tibor Gécsek (HUN); Europe	80.44	Igor Nikulin (RUS); Unified Team	78.28	Lance Deal (USA); United States	77.08
Javelin throw	Jan Železný (TCH); Europe	88.26	Tom Petranoff (RSA); Africa	79.90	Vladimir Sasimovich (BLR); Unified Team	78.40

=== Women ===
Event	Gold		Silver		Bronze	
100 metres	Natalya Voronova (RUS); Unified Team	11.33	Liliana Allen (CUB); Americas	11.34	Tian Yumei (CHN); Asia	11.44
200 metres	Marie-José Pérec (FRA); Europe	23.07	Natalya Voronova (RUS); Unified Team	23.24	Chen Zhaojing (CHN); Asia	23.27
400 metres	Jearl Miles (USA); United States	50.64	Charmaine Crooks (CAN); Americas	51.54	Lyudmila Dzhigalova (UKR); Unified Team	52.47
800 metres	Maria Mutola (MOZ); Africa	2:00.47	Joetta Clark (USA); United States	2:01.60	Yelena Afanasyeva (RUS); Unified Team	2:02.19
1500 metres	Yekaterina Podkopayeva (RUS); Unified Team	4:17.60	Małgorzata Rydz (POL); Europe	4:18.16	Alisa Hill (USA); United States	4:18.41
3000 metres	Derartu Tulu (ETH); Africa	9:05.89	Vera Chuvashova (RUS); Unified Team	9:08.30	Margareta Keszeg (ROU); Europe	9:09.03
10,000 metres	Derartu Tulu (ETH); Africa	33:38.97	Christine Toonstra (NED); Europe	33:46.19	Zhong Huandi (CHN); Asia	33:53.09
100 metre hurdles	Aliuska López (CUB); Americas	13.06	Anne Piquereau (FRA); Europe	13.13	Gabi Roth (GER); Germany	13.34
400 metre hurdles	Sandra Farmer-Patrick (USA); United States	55.38	Gowry Retchakan (GBR); Europe	55.66	Margarita Ponomaryova (RUS); Unified Team	56.46
4 × 100 metre relay	Asia; Gao Han; Tian Yumei; Chen Zhaojing; Xiao Yehua	43.63	Europe; Valerie Jean-Charles; Odiah Sidibé; Odile Singa; Marie-José Pérec	44.02	Africa; Lalao Ravaonirina; Rufina Ubah; Faith Idehen; Christy Opara-Thompson	44.21
4 × 400 metre relay	Americas; Rosey Edeh; Charmaine Crooks; Norfalia Carabalí; Ximena Restrepo	3:29.73	Unified Team; Marina Shmonina; Lyudmila Dzhigalova; Margarita Ponomaryova; Yelena Ruzina	3:30.43	Africa; Tina Paulino; Omolade Akinremi; Maria Mutola; Omotayo Akinremi	3:31.90
High jump	Ioamnet Quintero (CUB); Americas	1.94	Alina Astafei (ROU); Europe	1.91	Lucienne N'Da (CIV); Africa	1.88
Long jump	Heike Drechsler (GER); Germany	7.16	Yelena Sinchukova (RUS); Unified Team	6.85	Ljudmila Ninova (AUT); Europe	6.59
Triple jump	Li Huirong (CHN); Asia	13.88	Galina Chistyakova (RUS); Unified Team	13.67	Eloína Echevarría (CUB); Americas	13.45
Shot put	Belsy Laza (CUB); Americas	19.19	Marina Antonyuk (RUS); Unified Team	17.98	Kathrin Neimke (GER); Germany	17.97
Discus throw	Maritza Martén (CUB); Americas	69.30	Ilke Wyludda (GER); Germany	67.90	Min Chunfeng (CHN); Asia	63.38
Javelin throw	Tessa Sanderson (GBR); Europe	61.86	Irina Kostyuchenkova (UKR); Unified Team	58.10	Dulce García (CUB); Americas	58.08
