= Charles Jenkins Jr. =

American sprinter (born 1964)

Personal information
- Full name: Charles Lamont Jenkins Jr.
- Nickname: Chip
- Born: April 9, 1964 (age 62) New York City, U.S.
Medal record
Men's athletics
Representing the United States
Olympic Games
Gold medal – first place	1992 Barcelona	4 × 400 m relay

Charles Lamont "Chip" Jenkins Jr. (born April 9, 1964) is an American former track and field athlete. Jenkins won a gold medal at the 1992 Summer Olympics in Barcelona. Jenkins is the son of Charles "Charlie" Jenkins Sr., Olympic champion of 1956.

Jenkins competed for the Villanova Wildcats track and field team in the NCAA.

== See also ==
- Athletics at the 1992 Summer Olympics – Men's 4 × 400 metres relay
