= Edvin Ivanov =

Russian sprinter

Personal information
- Nationality: Russian
- Born: 25 July 1970 (age 55)
- Height: 186 cm (6 ft 1 in)
- Weight: 76 kg (168 lb)

Sport
- Sport: Sprinting
- Event: 200 metres

Edvin Nikolayevich Ivanov (Russian: Эдвин Николаевич Иванов, born July 25, 1970) is a Russian sprinter. He competed in the men's 200 metres at the 1992 Summer Olympics.
