= Christy Opara-Thompson =

Nigerian sprinter and long jumper

Personal information
- Nationality: Nigerian (until 1998); American (from 1998)
- Born: 24 December 1971 (age 54) Imo State, Nigeria
- Education: Brigham Young University, Citrus College, California State University, Los Angeles

Sport
- Sport: Track and field
- Events: 100 m, Long jump, 4×100 m relay
Medal record
Women's athletics
Representing Nigeria
Summer Olympics
Bronze medal – third place	1992 Barcelona	4x100 m relay
Commonwealth Games
Gold medal – first place	1994 Victoria	4x100 m relay
Silver medal – second place	1994 Victoria	100 m
Bronze medal – third place	1994 Victoria	Long jump
African Championships
Gold medal – first place	1993 Durban	4×100 m relay
Gold medal – first place	1993 Durban	Long jump
Bronze medal – third place	1989 Lagos	Long jump
Bronze medal – third place	1993 Durban	100 m
Summer Universiade
Silver medal – second place	1993 Buffalo	4x100 m relay

Christy Opara-Thompson (born 24 December 1971) is a Nigerian-American former track and field athlete who specialized in sprints and the long jump. She first represented Nigeria internationally before transferring allegiance to the United States in 1998.

A bronze medallist at the 1992 Summer Olympics and a multi-medallist at the Commonwealth Games, Opara-Thompson was one of Africa’s leading female sprinters during the 1990s.

== Early life and collegiate career ==
Born in Imo State, Nigeria, Opara-Thompson showed early promise in athletics. She was recruited to the United States on an athletic scholarship to compete for Brigham Young University (BYU) in Utah.

In 1989, she stunned the field at the NCAA Championships by winning the long jump with a personal best of 6.46 m (21 ft 2½ in). Despite her success, she transferred from BYU due to the cold climate, later attending Citrus College and graduating from California State University, Los Angeles with a degree in exercise physiology.

== International career ==
=== Olympic Games ===
Opara-Thompson represented Nigeria at the 1992 Summer Olympics in Barcelona, where she won the bronze medal in the 4 × 100 metres relay alongside Beatrice Utondu, Faith Idehen, and Mary Onyali. Their finish in 42.81 seconds marked Nigeria’s first-ever Olympic medal in a women’s relay event.

=== Commonwealth Games ===
At the 1994 Commonwealth Games in Victoria, Canada, she won:

- Silver in the 100 metres (11.22 s)
- Bronze in the long jump (6.72 m)
- Gold in the 4 × 100 metres relay (42.99 s, Games Record at the time)

=== African and world events ===
Opara-Thompson also medalled at:

- The 1993 African Championships: gold in the long jump and bronze in the 100 m
- The 1995 All-Africa Games: silver in the 100 m and relay
- The 1991 World Championships: part of Nigeria’s 4th-place relay team

She competed at the World University Games, winning multiple medals in sprint and jump events, and was a finalist in several global meets throughout her career.

=== National record and transfer to U.S. ===
In 1997 and 1998, Opara-Thompson became the fastest woman in the world over 60 metres indoors with a national record time of 7.02 s. On 18 October 1998, she officially changed her sporting nationality to represent the United States internationally.

== Personal bests ==
- 60 m (indoor) – 7.02 s (1997) – Nigerian national record
- 100 m – 11.07 s (1997)
- Long jump – 6.72 m (1994)
- 4 × 100 m relay – 42.39 s (1992)

== Post-athletic career ==
After retiring, Opara-Thompson returned to Nigeria and established the Soho24 Foundation focused on youth development, fitness, and elite sports performance. In 2020, she opened the Soho24 Foundation Sports Arena in Abuja—a multi-sport complex with facilities for track and field, indoor basketball, football, and strength training.

She is currently based between Nigeria and the U.S., working as a certified performance coach and advocate for female athletes over 40, promoting fitness, longevity, and youth development through sport.

== International competitions ==
Year	Competition	Venue	Position	Event	Result
Representing Nigeria
1992	1992 Summer Olympics	Barcelona, Spain	3rd	4×100 m relay	42.81 s
1994	Commonwealth Games	Victoria, Canada	2nd	100 m	11.22 s
1994	Commonwealth Games	Victoria, Canada	3rd	Long jump	6.72 m
1994	Commonwealth Games	Victoria, Canada	1st	4×100 m relay	42.99 s
