= Chen Zhaojing =

Chinese sprinter (born 1969)

Personal information
- Nationality: China
- Born: 5 April 1969 (age 57)

Sport
- Sport: Athletics
- Events: 100 metres, 200 metres
Medal record
Women's athletics
Representing China
Asian Championships
Gold medal – first place	1991 Kuala Lumpur	200 m
Gold medal – first place	1991 Kuala Lumpur	4×100 m
Gold medal – first place	1993 Manila	200 m
Gold medal – first place	1993 Manila	4×100 m
Silver medal – second place	1991 Kuala Lumpur	4×400 m

Chen Zhaojing (born 5 April 1969) is a former Chinese track and field athlete who competed in sprint events.

She won four national titles in the 200 metres between 1991 and 1994. Chen also won the 200 m event at the 1993 National Games of China in 22.56s, equaling Taiwanese Wang Huei-chen area record in the process. This mark stood until Susanthika Jayasinghe of Sri Lanka broke it in 1997, clocking 22.33s.

Chen took part in the 1992 Summer Olympics and to the 1993 World Indoor Championships, without reaching the final.

== Achievements ==
Year	Competition	Venue	Position	Notes
1991	Asian Championships	Kuala Lumpur, Malaysia	1st	200 m
1991	Asian Championships	Kuala Lumpur, Malaysia	1st	4 × 100 m
1992	IAAF World Cup	Havana, Cuba	3rd	200 m
1992	IAAF World Cup	Havana, Cuba	1st	4 × 100 m
1993	East Asian Games	Shanghai, China	2nd	200 m
1993	7th National Games of China	Beijing, China	1st	200 m
1993	Asian Championships	Manila, Philippines	1st	200 m
1994	IAAF World Cup	London, United Kingdom	5th	200m

== Personal bests ==
Event	Time	Venue	Date
60 m	7.63	Toronto, Canada	1993
100 m	11.28	Nanjing, China	1992
200 m	22.56	Beijing, China	1993
200 m indoor	24.25	Toronto, Canada	1993
