= 4 × 100 metres relay at the World Athletics Championships =

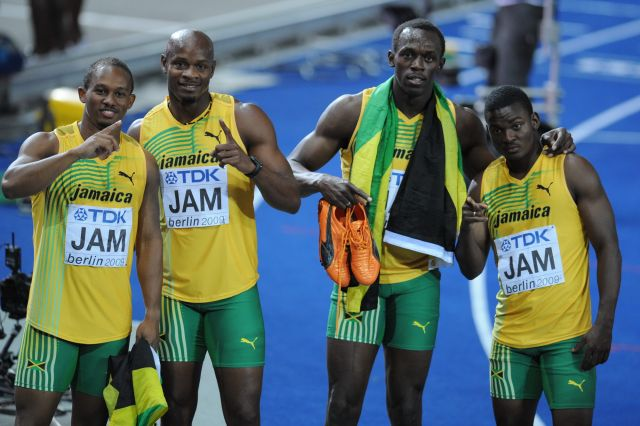
- The 2009-winning men's relay team from Jamaica

Overview
- Gender: Men and women
- Years held: Men: 1983 – 2025; Women: 1983 – 2025

Championship record
- Men: 37.04 Jamaica (2011)
- Women: 41.03 United States (2023)

Reigning champion
- Men: United States (USA)
- Women: United States (USA)

The 4 × 100 metres relay at the World Championships in Athletics has been contested by both men and women since the inaugural edition in 1983. It is the second most prestigious title in the discipline after the 4 × 100 metres relay at the Olympics. The competition format typically has one qualifying round leading to a final between eight teams. As of 2015, nations can qualify for the competition through a top eight finish at the previous IAAF World Relays event, with the remaining teams coming through the more traditional route of ranking highly on time in the seasonal lists. This system was modified due to the postponement of 2023 World Athletics Relays to 2024: therefore, the eight teams directly qualified are those of the 2022 World Championships, in Eugene, completed by eight more 2022-2023 top lists' teams.

The championship records for the event are 37.04 seconds for men, set by Jamaica in 2011, and 41.03 seconds for women, set by the United States in 2023. The men's world record has been broken or equalled at the competition on four occasions. The women's world record has never been broken or equalled at the competition.

The United States is the most successful nation in the discipline, with nine men's gold medals and nine women's gold medals. The next most successful nation is Jamaica, which has won four gold medals for men's and five for the women's events. Jamaica won in 1991, 2009, 2013, 2015, and 2019. The USA has won the most overall medals at 26 with Jamaica having the second most at 24. Canada, with three golds, and France, with two, are the only other nations to have won multiple titles. Great Britain has the third highest overall medal tally in the event with 15 medals.

Shelly-Ann Fraser-Pryce is the most successful athlete of the event, with four gold medals and four silver medals. Her compatriot Usain Bolt is the next most successful, with four consecutive gold medals from 2009 to 2015 and a silver medal in 2007. Kerron Stewart and Nesta Carter of Jamaica and Carl Lewis of the USA are the only other athletes to have won three gold medals in the relay event.

The United States has twice been stripped of the gold medal due to doping by athletes on the national team, having lost both men's and women's titles in 2001.

== Age ==
- All information from World Athletics.

| Distinction | Male | | | Female | | |
| Distinction | Athlete | Age | Date | Athlete | Age | Date |
|---|---|---|---|---|---|---|
| Youngest champion | Dexter Lee (JAM) | 20 years, 229 days | 4 Sep 2011 | Merlene Frazer (JAM) | 17 years, 248 days | 17 years, 248 days |
| Youngest medalist | Darrel Brown (TTO) | 16 years, 305 days | 12 Aug 2001 | Khalifa St. Fort (TTO) | 17 years, 197 days | 17 years, 197 days |
| Youngest finalist | Ibrahim Meité (CIV) | 16 years, 277 days | 22 Aug 1993 | Vernicha James (GBR) | 17 years, 66 days | 17 years, 66 days |
| Youngest participant | Yahya Saed Al-Kahes (KSA) | 15 years, 174 days | 2 Aug 2001 | Liang Xiaojing (CHN) | 16 years, 133 days | 16 years, 133 days |
| Oldest champion | Justin Gatlin (USA) | 37 years, 237 days | 5 Oct 2019 | Patricia Girard (FRA) | 35 years, 144 days | 30 Aug 2003 |
| Oldest medalist | Troy Douglas (NED) | 40 years, 274 days | 31 Aug 2003 | Chandra Sturrup (BAH) | 37 years, 344 days | 22 Aug 2009 |
| Oldest finalist | Troy Douglas (NED) | 40 years, 274 days | 31 Aug 2003 | Chandra Sturrup (BAH) | 37 years, 344 days | 22 Aug 2009 |
| Oldest participant | Troy Douglas (NED) | 40 years, 274 days | 31 Aug 2003 | Merlene Ottey (SLO) | 43 years, 111 days | 29 Aug 2003 |

== Doping ==
The men's event was affected by doping in its debut tournament in 1983, with Ben Johnson running for Canada, although the team did not progress beyond the first round. Johnson's drug use was only self-admitted during this period and he did not fail a drug test that year. Johnson ran for the fourth-placed Canada team at the 1987 event. His Canadian team mate Angella Issajenko later became the first female relay athlete to be sanctioned – she helped Canada to fifth at the same edition.

The positive drug test for Nigeria's Innocent Asonze in 1999 marked the first instance where a medal-winning team was disqualified at the World Championships in Athletics. Brazil was elevated to the bronze medal as a result. Doping persisted two years later, as France's Christophe Cheval was disqualified after a positive test for nandrolone shortly before the event (the team were semi-finalists only). The greatest disqualifications yet followed after the BALCO scandal in 2005. Tim Montgomery of the 2001-winning men's team was later disqualified following his admission of doping during the period, meaning that the American gold medallists were stricken from the record (South Africa were elevated as champions). Similarly, Marion Jones's and Kelli White's admitted usage led to the disqualification of the winning American women's team (Germany were made champions as a result).

The impact of the BALCO scandal extended to the 2003 edition, as medals were again reassigned as a result of British athlete Dwain Chambers doping. Brazil were elevated to silver and the Netherlands became the bronze medallists. The next doping disqualification to occur in the relay was in 2009, when Nigerian women's runner Toyin Augustus had her team's first round result annulled. A similar fate met Lim Hee-Nam and the South Korean men in 2011. The fourth-placed Trinidad and Tobago team had their result retrospectively disqualified due to Semoy Hackett's failed doping test prior to the competition. A third straight championships was affected as a result of Ukraine's Yelyzaveta Bryzhina failing a doping test for drostanolone (as of 2015 the Ukrainian relay team's first round result still stands, however).

== Medalists ==
=== Men ===
| Championships | Gold | Silver | Bronze |
|---|---|---|---|
| 1983 Helsinki | United States (USA); Emmit King; Willie Gault; Calvin Smith; Carl Lewis | Italy (ITA); Stefano Tilli; Carlo Simionato; Pierfrancesco Pavoni; Pietro Mennea | Soviet Union (URS); Andrey Prokofyev; Nikolay Sidorov; Vladimir Muravyov; Viktor Bryzhin |
| 1987 Rome | United States (USA); Lee McRae; Lee Vernon McNeill; Harvey Glance; Carl Lewis | Soviet Union (URS); Aleksandr Yevgenyev; Viktor Bryzhin; Vladimir Muravyov; Vladimir Krylov | Jamaica (JAM); John Mair; Andrew Smith; Clive Wright; Ray Stewart |
| 1991 Tokyo | United States (USA); Andre Cason; Leroy Burrell; Dennis Mitchell; Carl Lewis | France (FRA); Max Morinière; Daniel Sangouma; Jean-Charles Trouabal; Bruno Marie-Rose | Great Britain (GBR); Tony Jarrett; John Regis; Darren Braithwaite; Linford Christie |
| 1993 Stuttgart | United States (USA); Jon Drummond; Andre Cason; Dennis Mitchell; Leroy Burrell; Calvin Smith* | Great Britain (GBR); Colin Jackson; Tony Jarrett; John Regis; Linford Christie; Jason John*; Darren Braithwaite* | Canada (CAN); Robert Esmie; Glenroy Gilbert; Bruny Surin; Atlee Mahorn |
| 1995 Gothenburg | Canada (CAN); Donovan Bailey; Robert Esmie; Glenroy Gilbert; Bruny Surin | Australia (AUS); Paul Henderson; Tim Jackson; Steve Brimacombe; Damien Marsh | Italy (ITA); Giovanni Puggioni; Ezio Madonia; Angelo Cipolloni; Sandro Floris |
| 1997 Athens | Canada (CAN); Robert Esmie; Glenroy Gilbert; Bruny Surin; Donovan Bailey; Carlton Chambers* | Nigeria (NGR); Osmond Ezinwa; Olapade Adeniken; Francis Obikwelu; Davidson Ezinwa | Great Britain (GBR); Darren Braithwaite; Darren Campbell; Douglas Walker; Julian Golding; Dwain Chambers* |
| 1999 Seville^{[4x100m dq1]} | United States (USA); Jon Drummond; Tim Montgomery; Brian Lewis; Maurice Greene | Great Britain (GBR); Jason Gardener; Darren Campbell; Marlon Devonish; Dwain Chambers; Allyn Condon* | Brazil (BRA); Raphael de Oliveira; Claudinei da Silva; Édson Ribeiro; André Domingos |
| 2001 Edmonton^{[4x100m dq2]} | South Africa (RSA); Morné Nagel; Corné du Plessis; Lee-Roy Newton; Matthew Quinn | Trinidad and Tobago (TRI); Marc Burns; Ato Boldon; Jacey Harper; Darrel Brown | Australia (AUS); Matt Shirvington; Paul Di Bella; Steve Brimacombe; Adam Basil |
| 2003 Saint-Denis^{[4x100m dq3]} | United States (USA); John Capel Jr. Bernard Williams; Darvis Patton; Joshua J. Johnson | Brazil (BRA); Vicente de Lima; Édson Ribeiro; André Domingos; Cláudio Roberto Souza | Netherlands (NED); Timothy Beck; Troy Douglas; Patrick van Balkom; Caimin Douglas; Guus Hoogmoed* |
| 2005 Helsinki | France (FRA); Ladji Doucouré; Ronald Pognon; Eddy De Lépine; Lueyi Dovy; Oudéré Kankarafou* | Trinidad and Tobago (TRI); Kevon Pierre; Marc Burns; Jacey Harper; Darrel Brown | Great Britain (GBR); Jason Gardener; Marlon Devonish; Christian Malcolm; Mark Lewis-Francis |
| 2007 Osaka | United States (USA); Darvis Patton; Wallace Spearmon; Tyson Gay; Leroy Dixon; Rodney Martin* | Jamaica (JAM); Marvin Anderson; Usain Bolt; Nesta Carter; Asafa Powell; Dwight Thomas*; Steve Mullings* | Great Britain (GBR); Christian Malcolm; Craig Pickering; Marlon Devonish; Mark Lewis-Francis |
| 2009 Berlin | Jamaica (JAM); Steve Mullings; Michael Frater; Usain Bolt; Asafa Powell; Dwight Thomas*; Lerone Clarke* | Trinidad and Tobago (TRI); Darrel Brown; Marc Burns; Emmanuel Callender; Richard Thompson; Keston Bledman* | Great Britain (GBR); Simeon Williamson; Tyrone Edgar; Marlon Devonish; Harry Aikines-Aryeetey |
| 2011 Daegu | Jamaica (JAM); Nesta Carter; Michael Frater; Yohan Blake; Usain Bolt; Dexter Lee* | France (FRA); Teddy Tinmar; Christophe Lemaitre; Yannick Lesourd; Jimmy Vicaut | Saint Kitts and Nevis (SKN); Jason Rogers; Kim Collins; Antoine Adams; Brijesh Lawrence |
| 2013 Moscow | Jamaica (JAM); Nesta Carter; Kemar Bailey-Cole; Nickel Ashmeade; Usain Bolt; Warren Weir*; Oshane Bailey* | United States (USA); Charles Silmon; Mike Rodgers; Mookie Salaam; Justin Gatlin | Canada (CAN); Gavin Smellie; Aaron Brown; Dontae Richards-Kwok; Justyn Warner |
| 2015 Beijing | Jamaica (JAM); Nesta Carter; Asafa Powell; Nickel Ashmeade; Usain Bolt; Rasheed Dwyer* | China (CHN); Mo Youxue; Xie Zhenye; Su Bingtian; Zhang Peimeng | Canada (CAN); Aaron Brown; Andre De Grasse; Brendon Rodney; Justyn Warner |
| 2017 London | Great Britain (GBR); Chijindu Ujah; Adam Gemili; Danny Talbot; Nethaneel Mitchell-Blake | United States (USA); Mike Rodgers; Justin Gatlin; Jaylen Bacon; Christian Coleman; BeeJay Lee* | Japan (JPN); Shuhei Tada; Shōta Iizuka; Yoshihide Kiryū; Kenji Fujimitsu; Asuka Cambridge* |
| 2019 Doha | United States (USA); Christian Coleman; Justin Gatlin; Mike Rodgers; Noah Lyles; Cravon Gillespie* | Great Britain (GBR); Adam Gemili; Zharnel Hughes; Richard Kilty; Nethaneel Mitchell-Blake | Japan (JPN); Shuhei Tada; Kirara Shiraishi; Yoshihide Kiryū; Abdul Hakim Sani Brown; Yuki Koike* |
| 2022 Eugene | Canada (CAN); Aaron Brown; Jerome Blake; Brendon Rodney; Andre De Grasse | United States (USA); Christian Coleman; Noah Lyles; Elijah Hall; Marvin Bracy | Great Britain (GBR); Jona Efoloko; Zharnel Hughes; Nethaneel Mitchell-Blake; Reece Prescod; Adam Gemili* |
| 2023 Budapest | United States (USA); Christian Coleman; Fred Kerley; Brandon Carnes; Noah Lyles; JT Smith * | Italy (ITA); Roberto Rigali; Lamont Marcell Jacobs; Lorenzo Patta; Filippo Tortu | Jamaica (JAM); Ackeem Blake; Oblique Seville; Ryiem Forde; Rohan Watson |
| 2025 Tokyo | United States (USA); Christian Coleman; Kenny Bednarek; Courtney Lindsey; Noah Lyles; Ronnie Baker*; Trayvon Bromell*; T'Mars McCallum* | Canada (CAN); Aaron Brown; Jerome Blake; Brendon Rodney; Andre De Grasse | Netherlands (NED); Nsikak Ekpo; Taymir Burnet; Xavi Mo-Ajok; Elvis Afrifa |

Note * Indicates athletes who ran only in the preliminary round and also received medals.

- ^{4x100m dq1} The Nigerian team of Innocent Asonze, Francis Obikwelu, Daniel Effiong and Deji Aliu originally finished third in the 1999 World Championship, but were disqualified after Asonze was found to have used performance-enhancing drugs.
- ^{4x100m dq2} The United States team of Mickey Grimes, Bernard Williams, Dennis Mitchell and Tim Montgomery originally won the 2001 World Championship in a time of 37.96 seconds, but were disqualified after Montgomery admitted to drug use as a result of the BALCO scandal in 2005.
- ^{4x100m dq3} The British team of Christian Malcolm, Darren Campbell, Marlon Devonish and Dwain Chambers originally finished second in the 2003 World Championship, but were disqualified after Chambers was found to have used performance-enhancing drugs.

==== Medals by country ====
| Rank | Nation | Gold | Silver | Bronze | Total |
|---|---|---|---|---|---|
| 1 | United States (USA) | 10 | 3 | 0 | 13 |
| 2 | Jamaica (JAM) | 4 | 1 | 2 | 7 |
| 3 | Canada (CAN) | 3 | 1 | 3 | 7 |
| 4 | Great Britain (GBR) | 1 | 3 | 6 | 10 |
| 5 | France (FRA) | 1 | 2 | 0 | 3 |
| 6 | South Africa (RSA) | 1 | 0 | 0 | 1 |
| 7 | Trinidad and Tobago (TTO) | 0 | 3 | 0 | 3 |
| 8 | Italy (ITA) | 0 | 2 | 1 | 3 |
| 9 | Australia (AUS) | 0 | 1 | 1 | 2 |
| 9 | Brazil (BRA) | 0 | 1 | 1 | 2 |
| 9 | Soviet Union (URS) | 0 | 1 | 1 | 2 |
| 12 | Nigeria (NGR) | 0 | 1 | 0 | 1 |
| 12 | China (CHN) | 0 | 1 | 0 | 1 |
| 14 | Japan (JPN) | 0 | 0 | 2 | 2 |
| 15 | Netherlands (NED) | 0 | 0 | 2 | 2 |
| 16 | Saint Kitts and Nevis (SKN) | 0 | 0 | 1 | 1 |

==== Multiple medalists ====
| Rank | Athlete | Nation | Period | Gold | Silver | Bronze | Total |
|---|---|---|---|---|---|---|---|
| 1 | Usain Bolt | Jamaica (JAM) | 2007–2017 | 4 | 1 | 0 | 5 |
| 2 | Christian Coleman | United States (USA) | 2017–2025 | 3 | 2 | 0 | 5 |
| 3 | Nesta Carter | Jamaica (JAM) | 2007–2015 | 3 | 1 | 0 | 4 |
| 3 | Noah Lyles | United States (USA) | 2019–2025 | 3 | 1 | 0 | 4 |
| 5 | Carl Lewis | United States (USA) | 1983–1991 | 3 | 0 | 0 | 3 |
| 6 | Asafa Powell | Jamaica (JAM) | 2007–2015 | 2 | 1 | 0 | 3 |
| 7 | Robert Esmie | Canada (CAN) | 1993–1997 | 2 | 0 | 1 | 3 |
| 7 | Glenroy Gilbert | Canada (CAN) | 1993–1997 | 2 | 0 | 1 | 3 |
| 7 | Bruny Surin | Canada (CAN) | 1993–1997 | 2 | 0 | 1 | 3 |
| 10 | Calvin Smith | United States (USA) | 1983–1993 | 2 | 0 | 0 | 2 |
| 10 | Andre Cason | United States (USA) | 1991–1993 | 2 | 0 | 0 | 2 |
| 10 | Dennis Mitchell | United States (USA) | 1991–1993 | 2 | 0 | 0 | 2 |
| 10 | Leroy Burrell | United States (USA) | 1991–1993 | 2 | 0 | 0 | 2 |
| 10 | Jon Drummond | United States (USA) | 1993–1999 | 2 | 0 | 0 | 2 |
| 10 | Donovan Bailey | Canada (CAN) | 1995–1997 | 2 | 0 | 0 | 2 |
| 10 | Darvis Patton | United States (USA) | 2003–2007 | 2 | 0 | 0 | 2 |
| 10 | Michael Frater | Jamaica (JAM) | 2009–2011 | 2 | 0 | 0 | 2 |
| 10 | Nickel Ashmeade | Jamaica (JAM) | 2009–2011 | 2 | 0 | 0 | 2 |
| 19 | Mike Rodgers | United States (USA) | 2015–2019 | 1 | 2 | 0 | 3 |
| 19 | Justin Gatlin | United States (USA) | 2015–2019 | 1 | 2 | 0 | 3 |
| 21 | Aaron Brown | Canada (CAN) | 2013–2025 | 1 | 1 | 2 | 4 |
| 22 | Adam Gemili | Great Britain (GBR) | 2017–2022 | 1 | 1 | 1 | 3 |
| 22 | Nethaneel Mitchell-Blake | Great Britain (GBR) | 2017–2022 | 1 | 1 | 1 | 3 |
| 22 | Andre De Grasse | Canada (CAN) | 2015–2025 | 1 | 1 | 1 | 3 |
| 22 | Brendon Rodney | Canada (CAN) | 2015–2025 | 1 | 1 | 1 | 3 |
| 26 | Dwight Thomas | Jamaica (JAM) | 2007–2009 | 1 | 1 | 0 | 2 |
| 26 | Steve Mullings | Jamaica (JAM) | 2007–2009 | 1 | 1 | 0 | 2 |
| 26 | Jerome Blake | Canada (CAN) | 2022-2025 | 1 | 1 | 0 | 2 |
| 29 | Marc Burns | Trinidad and Tobago (TRI) | 2001–2009 | 0 | 3 | 0 | 3 |
| 29 | Darrel Brown | Trinidad and Tobago (TRI) | 2001–2009 | 0 | 3 | 0 | 3 |
| 31 | Jacey Harper | Trinidad and Tobago (TRI) | 2001–2005 | 0 | 2 | 0 | 2 |
| 32 | Marlon Devonish | Great Britain (GBR) | 1999–2009 | 0 | 1 | 3 | 4 |
| 33 | Darren Braithwaite | Great Britain (GBR) | 1991–1997 | 0 | 1 | 2 | 3 |
| 34 | Viktor Bryzhin | Soviet Union (URS) | 1983–1987 | 0 | 1 | 1 | 2 |
| 34 | Vladimir Muravyov | Soviet Union (URS) | 1983–1987 | 0 | 1 | 1 | 2 |
| 34 | Tony Jarrett | Great Britain (GBR) | 1991–1993 | 0 | 1 | 1 | 2 |
| 34 | John Regis | Great Britain (GBR) | 1991–1993 | 0 | 1 | 1 | 2 |
| 34 | Linford Christie | Great Britain (GBR) | 1991–1993 | 0 | 1 | 1 | 2 |
| 34 | Steve Brimacombe | Australia (AUS) | 1995–2001 | 0 | 1 | 1 | 2 |
| 34 | Darren Campbell | Great Britain (GBR) | 1997–1999 | 0 | 1 | 1 | 2 |
| 34 | Dwain Chambers | Great Britain (GBR) | 1997–1999 | 0 | 1 | 1 | 2 |
| 42 | Jason Gardener | Great Britain (GBR) | 1999–2005 | 0 | 1 | 1 | 2 |
| 42 | Zharnel Hughes | Great Britain (GBR) | 2019–2022 | 0 | 1 | 1 | 2 |
| 44 | Christian Malcolm | Great Britain (GBR) | 2005–2007 | 0 | 0 | 2 | 2 |
| 44 | Mark Lewis-Francis | Great Britain (GBR) | 2005–2007 | 0 | 0 | 2 | 2 |
| 44 | Justyn Warner | Canada (CAN) | 2013–2015 | 0 | 0 | 2 | 2 |
| 44 | Shuhei Tada | Japan (JPN) | 2017–2019 | 0 | 0 | 2 | 2 |
| 44 | Yoshihide Kiryū | Japan (JPN) | 2017–2019 | 0 | 0 | 2 | 2 |

==== Medals by country ====
| Rank | Nation | Gold | Silver | Bronze | Total |
|---|---|---|---|---|---|
| 1 | United States (USA) | 9 | 3 | 0 | 12 |
| 2 | Jamaica (JAM) | 4 | 1 | 2 | 7 |
| 3 | Canada (CAN) | 3 | 0 | 3 | 6 |
| 4 | Great Britain (GBR) | 1 | 3 | 6 | 10 |
| 5 | France (FRA) | 1 | 2 | 0 | 3 |
| 6 | South Africa (RSA) | 1 | 0 | 0 | 1 |
| 7 | Trinidad and Tobago (TTO) | 0 | 3 | 0 | 3 |
| 8 | Italy (ITA) | 0 | 2 | 1 | 3 |
| 9 | Australia (AUS) | 0 | 1 | 1 | 2 |
| 9 | Brazil (BRA) | 0 | 1 | 1 | 2 |
| 9 | Soviet Union (URS) | 0 | 1 | 1 | 2 |
| 12 | Nigeria (NGR) | 0 | 1 | 0 | 1 |
| 12 | China (CHN) | 0 | 1 | 0 | 1 |
| 14 | Japan (JPN) | 0 | 0 | 2 | 2 |
| 15 | Netherlands (NED) | 0 | 0 | 1 | 1 |
| 15 | Saint Kitts and Nevis (SKN) | 0 | 0 | 1 | 1 |

=== Women ===
| Championships | Gold | Silver | Bronze |
|---|---|---|---|
| 1983 Helsinki | East Germany (GDR); Silke Gladisch; Marita Koch; Ingrid Auerswald; Marlies Oelsner-Göhr | Great Britain (GBR); Joan Baptiste; Kathy Cook; Beverley Callender; Shirley Thomas | Jamaica (JAM); Leleith Hodges; Jacqueline Pusey; Juliet Cuthbert; Merlene Ottey |
| 1987 Rome | United States (USA); Alice Brown; Diane Williams; Florence Griffith Joyner; Pam Marshall | East Germany (GDR); Silke Möller; Cornelia Oschkenat; Kerstin Behrendt; Marlies Göhr | Soviet Union (URS); Irina Slyusar; Natalya Pomoshchnikova; Natalya German; Olga Antonova |
| 1991 Tokyo | Jamaica (JAM); Dahlia Duhaney; Juliet Cuthbert; Beverly McDonald; Merlene Ottey; Merlene Frazer* | Soviet Union (URS); Natalya Kovtun; Galina Malchugina; Yelena Vinogradova; Irina Privalova | Germany (GER); Grit Breuer; Katrin Krabbe; Sabine Richter; Heike Drechsler |
| 1993 Stuttgart | Russia (RUS); Olga Bogoslovskaya; Galina Malchugina; Natalya Pomoshchnikova-Voronova; Irina Privalova; Marina Trandenkova* | United States (USA); Michelle Finn; Gwen Torrence; Wendy Vereen; Gail Devers; Sheila Echols* | Jamaica (JAM); Michelle Freeman; Juliet Campbell; Nikole Mitchell; Merlene Ottey; Dahlia Duhaney* |
| 1995 Gothenburg | United States (USA); Celena Mondie-Milner; Carlette Guidry; Chryste Gaines; Gwen Torrence; D'Andre Hill* | Jamaica (JAM); Dahlia Duhaney; Juliet Cuthbert; Beverly McDonald; Merlene Ottey; Michelle Freeman* | Germany (GER); Melanie Paschke; Silke Lichtenhagen; Silke-Beate Knoll; Gabriele Becker |
| 1997 Athens | United States (USA); Chryste Gaines; Marion Jones; Inger Miller; Gail Devers | Jamaica (JAM); Beverly McDonald; Merlene Frazer; Juliet Cuthbert; Beverly Grant | France (FRA); Patricia Girard-Léno; Christine Arron; Delphine Combe; Sylviane Félix; Frédérique Bangué* |
| 1999 Seville | Bahamas (BAH); Savatheda Fynes; Chandra Sturrup; Pauline Davis-Thompson; Debbie Ferguson; Eldece Clarke-Lewis* | France (FRA); Patricia Girard; Muriel Hurtis; Katia Benth; Christine Arron; Fabé Dia* | Jamaica (JAM); Aleen Bailey; Merlene Frazer, Beverly McDonald; Peta-Gaye Dowdie |
| 2001 Edmonton^{dq1} | Germany (GER); Melanie Paschke; Gabi Rockmeier; Birgit Rockmeier; Marion Wagner | France (FRA); Sylviane Félix; Frédérique Bangué; Muriel Hurtis; Odiah Sidibé | Jamaica (JAM); Juliet Campbell; Merlene Frazer; Beverly McDonald; Astia Walker; Elva Goulbourne* |
| 2003 Saint-Denis | France (FRA); Patricia Girard-Léno; Muriel Hurtis; Sylviane Félix; Christine Arron | United States (USA); Angela Williams; Chryste Gaines; Inger Miller; Torri Edwards; Lauryn Williams* | Russia (RUS); Olga Fyodorova; Yuliya Tabakova; Marina Kislova; Larisa Kruglova |
| 2005 Helsinki | United States (USA); Angela Daigle; Muna Lee; Me'Lisa Barber; Lauryn Williams | Jamaica (JAM); Danielle Browning; Sherone Simpson; Aleen Bailey; Veronica Campbell; Beverly McDonald* | Belarus (BLR); Yulia Nestsiarenka; Natallia Solohub; Alena Newmyarzhytskaya; Aksana Drahun |
| 2007 Osaka | United States (USA); Lauryn Williams; Allyson Felix; Mikele Barber; Torri Edwards; Carmelita Jeter*; Mechelle Lewis* | Jamaica (JAM); Sheri-Ann Brooks; Kerron Stewart; Simone Facey; Veronica Campbell; Shelly-Ann Fraser* | Belgium (BEL); Olivia Borlée; Hanna Mariën; Élodie Ouédraogo; Kim Gevaert |
| 2009 Berlin | Jamaica (JAM); Simone Facey; Shelly-Ann Fraser; Aleen Bailey; Kerron Stewart | Bahamas (BAH); Sheniqua Ferguson; Chandra Sturrup; Christine Amertil; Debbie Ferguson-McKenzie | Germany (GER); Marion Wagner; Anne Möllinger; Cathleen Tschirch; Verena Sailer |
| 2011 Daegu | United States (USA); Bianca Knight; Allyson Felix; Marshevet Myers; Carmelita Jeter; Shalonda Solomon*; Alexandria Anderson* | Jamaica (JAM); Shelly-Ann Fraser-Pryce; Kerron Stewart; Sherone Simpson; Veronica Campbell-Brown; Jura Levy* | Ukraine (UKR); Olesya Povh; Nataliya Pohrebnyak; Mariya Ryemyen; Hrystyna Stuy |
| 2013 Moscow | Jamaica (JAM); Carrie Russell; Kerron Stewart; Schillonie Calvert; Shelly-Ann Fraser-Pryce; Sheri-Ann Brooks* | United States (USA); Jeneba Tarmoh; Alexandria Anderson; English Gardner; Octavious Freeman | Great Britain (GBR); Dina Asher-Smith; Ashleigh Nelson; Annabelle Lewis; Hayley Jones |
| 2015 Beijing | Jamaica (JAM); Veronica Campbell-Brown; Natasha Morrison; Elaine Thompson; Shelly-Ann Fraser-Pryce; Sherone Simpson*; Kerron Stewart* | United States (USA); English Gardner; Allyson Felix; Jenna Prandini; Jasmine Todd | Trinidad and Tobago (TRI); Kelly-Ann Baptiste; Michelle-Lee Ahye; Reyare Thomas; Semoy Hackett; Khalifa St. Fort* |
| 2017 London | United States (USA); Aaliyah Brown; Allyson Felix; Morolake Akinosun; Tori Bowie; Ariana Washington* | Great Britain (GBR); Asha Philip; Desirèe Henry; Dina Asher-Smith; Daryll Neita | Jamaica (JAM); Jura Levy; Natasha Morrison; Simone Facey; Sashalee Forbes; Christania Williams* |
| 2019 Doha | Jamaica (JAM); Natalliah Whyte; Shelly-Ann Fraser-Pryce; Jonielle Smith; Shericka Jackson; Natasha Morrison* | Great Britain (GBR); Asha Philip; Dina Asher-Smith; Ashleigh Nelson; Daryll Neita; Imani-Lara Lansiquot* | United States (USA); Dezerea Bryant; Teahna Daniels; Morolake Akinosun; Kiara Parker |
| 2022 Eugene | United States (USA); Melissa Jefferson; Abby Steiner; Jenna Prandini; Twanisha Terry; Aleia Hobbs* | Jamaica (JAM); Kemba Nelson; Elaine Thompson-Herah; Shelly-Ann Fraser-Pryce; Shericka Jackson; Briana Williams*; Natalliah Whyte*; Remona Burchell* | Germany (GER); Tatjana Pinto; Alexandra Burghardt; Gina Lückenkemper; Rebekka Haase |
| 2023 Budapest | United States (USA); Tamari Davis; Twanisha Terry; Gabby Thomas; Sha'Carri Richardson; Tamara Clark*; Melissa Jefferson* | Jamaica (JAM); Natasha Morrison; Shelly-Ann Fraser-Pryce; Shashalee Forbes; Shericka Jackson; Briana Williams*; Elaine Thompson-Herah* | Great Britain (GBR); Asha Philip; Imani-Lara Lansiquot; Bianca Williams; Daryll Neita; Annie Tagoe* |
| 2025 Tokyo | United States (USA); Melissa Jefferson-Wooden; Twanisha Terry; Kayla White; Sha'Carri Richardson; Jacious Sears* | Jamaica (JAM); Shelly-Ann Fraser-Pryce; Tia Clayton; Tina Clayton; Jonielle Smith; Jodean Williams* | Germany (GER); Sina Mayer; Rebekka Haase; Sophia Junk; Gina Lückenkemper |

Note * Indicates athletes who ran only in the preliminary round and also received medals.

- ^{dq1} The United States team of Kelli White, Chryste Gaines, Inger Miller, and Marion Jones originally won the 2001 World Championship in a time of 41.71 seconds, but were disqualified after Jones and White were found to have used performance-enhancing drugs.

==== Multiple medalists ====
| Rank | Athlete | Nation | Period | Gold | Silver | Bronze | Total |
|---|---|---|---|---|---|---|---|
| 1 | Shelly-Ann Fraser-Pryce | Jamaica (JAM) | 2007–2025 | 4 | 5 | 0 | 9 |
| 2 | Kerron Stewart | Jamaica (JAM) | 2007–2015 | 3 | 2 | 0 | 5 |
| 3 | Allyson Felix | United States (USA) | 2007–2017 | 3 | 1 | 0 | 4 |
| 4 | Melissa Jefferson | United States (USA) | 2022–2025 | 3 | 0 | 0 | 3 |
| 4 | Twanisha Terry | United States (USA) | 2022–2025 | 3 | 0 | 0 | 3 |
| 6 | Natasha Morrison | Jamaica (JAM) | 2015–2023 | 2 | 1 | 1 | 4 |
| 7 | Chryste Gaines | United States (USA) | 1995–2003 | 2 | 1 | 0 | 3 |
| 7 | Lauryn Williams | United States (USA) | 2003–2007 | 2 | 1 | 0 | 3 |
| 9 | Carmelita Jeter | United States (USA) | 2007–2011 | 2 | 0 | 0 | 2 |
| 9 | Sha'Carri Richardson | United States (USA) | 2023-2025 | 2 | 0 | 0 | 2 |
| 11 | Beverly McDonald | Jamaica (JAM) | 1991–2005 | 1 | 3 | 2 | 6 |
| 12 | Veronica Campbell | Jamaica (JAM) | 2005–2015 | 1 | 3 | 0 | 4 |
| 13 | Juliet Cuthbert | Jamaica (JAM) | 1983–1997 | 1 | 2 | 1 | 4 |
| 14 | Muriel Hurtis | France (FRA) | 1999–2003 | 1 | 2 | 0 | 3 |
| 14 | Sherone Simpson | Jamaica (JAM) | 2005–2015 | 1 | 2 | 0 | 3 |
| 14 | Shericka Jackson | Jamaica (JAM) | 2019–2023 | 1 | 2 | 0 | 3 |
| 14 | Elaine Thompson-Herah | Jamaica (JAM) | 2015–2023 | 1 | 2 | 0 | 3 |
| 18 | Merlene Ottey | Jamaica (JAM) | 1983–1995 | 1 | 1 | 2 | 4 |
| 18 | Merlene Frazer | Jamaica (JAM) | 1991–2001 | 1 | 1 | 2 | 4 |
| 20 | Patricia Girard | France (FRA) | 1997–2003 | 1 | 1 | 1 | 3 |
| 20 | Christine Arron | France (FRA) | 1997–2003 | 1 | 1 | 1 | 3 |
| 20 | Sylviane Félix | France (FRA) | 1997–2003 | 1 | 1 | 1 | 3 |
| 20 | Aleen Bailey | Jamaica (JAM) | 1999–2009 | 1 | 1 | 1 | 3 |
| 24 | Silke Möller | East Germany (GDR) | 1983–1987 | 1 | 1 | 0 | 2 |
| 24 | Marlies Göhr | East Germany (GDR) | 1983–1987 | 1 | 1 | 0 | 2 |
| 24 | Galina Malchugina | Soviet Union (URS); Russia (RUS) | 1991–1993 | 1 | 1 | 0 | 2 |
| 24 | Irina Privalova | Soviet Union (URS); Russia (RUS) | 1991–1993 | 1 | 1 | 0 | 2 |
| 24 | Gwen Torrence | United States (USA) | 1993–1995 | 1 | 1 | 0 | 2 |
| 24 | Gail Devers | United States (USA) | 1993–1997 | 1 | 1 | 0 | 2 |
| 24 | Chandra Sturrup | Bahamas (BAH) | 1999–2009 | 1 | 1 | 0 | 2 |
| 24 | Debbie Ferguson-McKenzie | Bahamas (BAH) | 1999–2009 | 1 | 1 | 0 | 2 |
| 24 | Inger Miller | United States (USA) | 1997–2003 | 1 | 1 | 0 | 2 |
| 24 | Torri Edwards | United States (USA) | 2003–2007 | 1 | 1 | 0 | 2 |
| 24 | Sheri-Ann Brooks | Jamaica (JAM) | 2007–2013 | 1 | 1 | 0 | 2 |
| 24 | Simone Facey | Jamaica (JAM) | 2007–2009 | 1 | 1 | 0 | 2 |
| 24 | Alexandria Anderson | United States (USA) | 2011–2013 | 1 | 1 | 0 | 2 |
| 24 | Jenna Prandini | United States (USA) | 2015–2022 | 1 | 1 | 0 | 2 |
| 24 | Natalliah Whyte | Jamaica (JAM) | 2019–2022 | 1 | 1 | 0 | 2 |
| 24 | Jonielle Smith | Jamaica (JAM) | 2019–2025 | 1 | 1 | 0 | 2 |
| 40 | Natalya Pomoshchnikova-Voronova | Soviet Union (URS); Russia (RUS) | 1987–1993 | 1 | 0 | 1 | 2 |
| 40 | Marion Wagner | Germany (GER) | 2001–2009 | 1 | 0 | 1 | 2 |
| 43 | Dina Asher-Smith | Great Britain (GBR) | 2013–2019 | 0 | 2 | 1 | 3 |
| 43 | Asha Philip | Great Britain (GBR) | 2015–2023 | 0 | 2 | 1 | 3 |
| 43 | Daryll Neita | Great Britain (GBR) | 2017–2023 | 0 | 2 | 1 | 3 |
| 46 | English Gardner | United States (USA) | 2013–2015 | 0 | 2 | 0 | 2 |
| 46 | Briana Williams | Jamaica (JAM) | 2022–2023 | 0 | 2 | 0 | 2 |
| 48 | Michelle Freeman | Jamaica (JAM) | 1993–1995 | 0 | 1 | 1 | 2 |
| 48 | Frédérique Bangué | France (FRA) | 1997–2001 | 0 | 1 | 1 | 2 |
| 48 | Ashleigh Nelson | Great Britain (GBR) | 2013–2019 | 0 | 1 | 1 | 2 |
| 48 | Shashalee Forbes | Jamaica (JAM) | 2015–2023 | 0 | 1 | 1 | 2 |
| 48 | Imani-Lara Lansiquot | Great Britain (GBR) | 2019–2023 | 0 | 1 | 1 | 2 |
| 53 | Juliet Campbell | Jamaica (JAM) | 1993–2001 | 0 | 0 | 2 | 2 |
| 53 | Rebekka Haase | Germany (GER) | 2022-2025 | 0 | 0 | 2 | 2 |
| 53 | Gina Lückenkemper | Germany (GER) | 2022-2025 | 0 | 0 | 2 | 2 |

==== Medals by country ====
| Rank | Nation | Gold | Silver | Bronze | Total |
|---|---|---|---|---|---|
| 1 | United States (USA) | 10 | 4 | 1 | 15 |
| 2 | Jamaica (JAM) | 5 | 8 | 5 | 18 |
| 3 | France (FRA) | 1 | 2 | 1 | 4 |
| 4 | Bahamas (BAH) | 1 | 1 | 0 | 2 |
| 4 | East Germany (GDR) | 1 | 1 | 0 | 2 |
| 6 | Germany (GER) | 1 | 0 | 5 | 6 |
| 7 | Russia (RUS) | 1 | 0 | 1 | 2 |
| 8 | Great Britain (GBR) | 0 | 3 | 2 | 5 |
| 9 | Soviet Union (URS) | 0 | 1 | 1 | 2 |
| 10 | Belarus (BLR) | 0 | 0 | 1 | 1 |
| 10 | Belgium (BEL) | 0 | 0 | 1 | 1 |
| 10 | Trinidad and Tobago (TRI) | 0 | 0 | 1 | 1 |
| 10 | Ukraine (UKR) | 0 | 0 | 1 | 1 |

== Championship record progression ==
=== Men ===
Men's 4 × 100 metres relay World Championships record progression
| Time | Nation | Athletes | Year | Round | Date |
|---|---|---|---|---|---|
| 39.22 | East Germany (GDR) | Andreas Knebel, Thomas Schröder, Jens Hübler, Frank Emmelmann | 1983 | Heats | 9 August |
| 38.75 | United States (USA) | Emmit King, Willie Gault, Calvin Smith, Carl Lewis | 1983 | Heats | 9 August |
| 38.62 | Soviet Union (URS) | Andrey Prokofyev, Nikolay Sidorov, Vladimir Muravyov, Viktor Bryzgin | 1983 | Semi-finals | 10 August |
| 38.50 | United States (USA) | Emmit King, Willie Gault, Calvin Smith, Carl Lewis | 1983 | Semi-finals | 10 August |
| 37.86 WR | United States (USA) | Emmit King, Willie Gault, Calvin Smith, Carl Lewis | 1983 | Final | 10 August |
| 37.75 | United States (USA) | Andre Cason, Leroy Burrell, Dennis Mitchell, Michael Marsh | 1991 | Semi-finals | 31 August |
| 37.50 WR | United States (USA) | Andre Cason, Leroy Burrell, Dennis Mitchell, Carl Lewis | 1991 | Final | 1 September |
| 37.40 WR | United States (USA) | Jon Drummond, Andre Cason, Dennis Mitchell, Leroy Burrell | 1993 | Semi-finals | 21 August |
| 37.31 | Jamaica (JAM) | Usain Bolt, Michael Frater, Steve Mullings, Asafa Powell | 2009 | Final | 22 August |
| 37.04 WR | Jamaica (JAM) | Nesta Carter, Michael Frater, Yohan Blake, Usain Bolt | 2011 | Final | 4 September |

=== Women ===
Women's 4 × 100 metres relay World Championships record progression
| Time | Nation | Athletes | Year | Round | Date |
|---|---|---|---|---|---|
| 43.06 | Great Britain (GBR) | Joan Baptiste, Kathy Smallwood-Cook, Beverley Callender, Shirley Thomas | 1983 | Heats | 10 August |
| 42.59 | East Germany (GDR) | Silke Gladisch-Möller, Marita Koch, Ingrid Auerswald-Lange, Marlies Oelsner-Göhr | 1983 | Heats | 10 August |
| 41.76 | East Germany (GDR) | Silke Gladisch-Möller, Marita Koch, Ingrid Auerswald-Lange, Marlies Oelsner-Göhr | 1983 | Final | 10 August |
| 41.58 | United States (USA) | Alice Brown, Diane Williams, Florence Griffith Joyner, Pam Marshall | 1987 | Final | 6 September |
| 41.49 | Russia (RUS) | Olga Bogoslovskaya, Galina Malchugina, Natalya Voronova, Irina Privalova | 1993 | Final | 22 August |
| 41.49^{[nb2]} | United States (USA) | Michelle Finn, Gwen Torrence, Wendy Vereen, Gail Devers | 1993 | Final | 22 August |
| 41.47 | United States (USA) | Chryste Gaines, Marion Jones, Inger Miller, Gail Devers | 1997 | Final | 9 August |
| 41.29 | Jamaica (JAM) | Carrie Russell, Kerron Stewart, Schillonie Calvert, Shelly-Ann Fraser-Pryce | 2013 | Final | 18 August |
| 41.07 | Jamaica (JAM) | Veronica Campbell-Brown, Natasha Morrison, Elaine Thompson, Shelly-Ann Fraser-Pryce | 2015 | Final | 29 August |
| 41.03 | United States (USA) | Tamari Davis, Twanisha Terry, Gabrielle Thomas, Sha'Carri Richardson | 2023 | Final | 26 August |

- ^{nb2} Russia and the United States team shared the same championship record time of 41.49, although Russia won the title when measuring the time down to thousandths of a second

== Finishing times ==
=== Top ten fastest World Championship times ===
Fastest men's times at the World Championships
| Rank | Time (sec) | Nation | Athletes | Games | Round | Date |
|---|---|---|---|---|---|---|
| 1 | 37.04 | Jamaica (JAM) | Nesta Carter, Michael Frater, Yohan Blake, Usain Bolt | 2011 | Final | 4 September |
| 2 | 37.10 | United States (USA) | Christian Coleman, Justin Gatlin, Michael Rodgers, Noah Lyles | 2019 | Final | 5 October |
| 3 | 37.29 | United States (USA) | Christian Coleman, Kenneth Bednarek, Courtney Lindsey, Noah Lyles | 2025 | Final | 21 September |
| 4 | 37.31 | Jamaica (JAM) | Steve Mullings, Michael Frater, Usain Bolt, Asafa Powell | 2009 | Final | 22 August |
| 5= | 37.36 | Jamaica (JAM) | Nesta Carter, Kemar Bailey-Cole, Nickel Ashmeade, Usain Bolt | 2013 | Final | 18 August |
| 5= | 37.36 | Jamaica (JAM) | Nesta Carter, Asafa Powell, Nickel Ashmeade, Usain Bolt | 2015 | Final | 29 August |
| 5= | 37.36 | Great Britain (GBR) | Adam Gemili, Zharnel Hughes, Richard Kilty, Nethaneel Mitchell-Blake | 2019 | Final | 5 October |
| 8 | 37.38 | United States (USA) | Christian Coleman, Fred Kerley, Brandon Carnes, Noah Lyles | 2023 | Final | 26 August |
| 9 | 37.40 | United States (USA) | Jon Drummond, Andre Carson, Dennis Mitchell, Leroy Burrell | 1993 | Semi-finals | 23 August |
| 10 | 37.41 | Jamaica (JAM) | Nesta Carter, Asafa Powell, Rasheed Dwyer, Nickel Ashmeade | 2015 | Heats | 29 August |

Fastest women's times at the World Championships
| Rank | Time (sec) | Nation | Athletes | Games | Round | Date |
|---|---|---|---|---|---|---|
| 1 | 41.03 | United States (USA) | Tamari Davis, Twanisha Terry, Gabrielle Thomas, Sha'Carri Richardson | 2023 | Final | 26 August |
| 2 | 41.07 | Jamaica (JAM) | Veronica Campbell-Brown, Natasha Morrison, Elaine Thompson, Shelly-Ann Fraser-Pryce | 2015 | Final | 29 August |
| 3 | 41.14 | United States (USA) | Melissa Jefferson, Abby Steiner, Jenna Prandini, Twanisha Terry | 2022 | Final | 23 July |
| 4 | 41.18 | Jamaica (JAM) | Kemba Nelson, Elaine Thompson-Herah, Shelly-Ann Fraser-Pryce, Shericka Jackson | 2022 | Final | 23 July |
| 5 | 41.21 | Jamaica (JAM) | Natasha Morrison, Shelly-Ann Fraser-Pryce, Shashalee Forbes, Shericka Jackson | 2023 | Final | 26 August |
| 6 | 41.29 | Jamaica (JAM) | Carrie Russell, Kerron Stewart, Schillonie Calvert, Shelly-Ann Fraser-Pryce | 2013 | Final | 18 August |
| 7 | 41.44 | Jamaica (JAM) | Natalliah Whyte, Shelly-Ann Fraser-Pryce, Jonielle Smith, Shericka Jackson | 2019 | Final | 5 October |
| 8 | 41.47 | United States (USA) | Gail Devers, Inger Miller, Marion Jones, Chryste Gaines | 1997 | Final | 9 August |
| 9= | 41.49 | Russia (RUS) | Olga Bogoslovskaya, Galina Malchugina, Natalya Voronova, Irina Privalova | 1993 | Final | 22 August |
| 9= | 41.49 | United States (USA) | Michelle Finn, Gwen Torrence, Wenda Vereen, Gail Devers | 1993 | Final | 22 August |

== Bibliography ==
- Butler, Mark (2013). IAAF Statistics Book Moscow 2013 (PDF). IAAF. Archived from the original (PDF) on 12 October 2014.
