= United States at the 2013 World Championships in Athletics =

- WA code: USA
- National federation: USA Track & Field
- Website: www.usatf.org

in Moscow
- Competitors: 137
- Medals Ranked 1st: Gold 8 Silver 13 Bronze 5 Total 26

World Championships in Athletics appearances (overview)
- 1976; 1980; 1983; 1987; 1991; 1993; 1995; 1997; 1999; 2001; 2003; 2005; 2007; 2009; 2011; 2013; 2015; 2017; 2019; 2022; 2023; 2025

The United States of America competed at the 2013 World Championships in Athletics from August 10 to August 18 in Moscow, Russia. The membership of the team was selected at the 2013 USA Outdoor Track and Field Championships. However, membership on the team was subject to the athlete achieving a qualification standard. In addition, champions from the previous World Championships and the 2012 IAAF Diamond League receive an automatic bye. An automatic entry is also available to an Area Champion, the IAAF definition of an Area essentially being the specified continental areas of the world. The United States is part of the North American, Central American and Caribbean Athletic Association, which has not held a championship apparently since its inaugural championship in 2007. The deadline for entries was July 20. The final team membership as submitted to the IAAF was announced on July 29, 2013.

== Medallists ==
The following American competitors won medals at the Championships

| Medal | Name | Event | Date |
|---|---|---|---|
| Gold | Brittney Reese | Long jump | 11 August |
| Gold | Ashton Eaton | Decathlon | 11 August |
| Gold | David Oliver | 110 metres hurdles | 12 August |
| Silver | Justin Gatlin | 100 metres | 11 August |
| Silver | Ryan Wilson | 110 metres hurdles | 12 August |
| Bronze | Carmelita Jeter | 100 metres | 12 August |

== Team selection ==
The team was led by reigning World Champions Jason Richardson (110m hurdles), Christian Taylor (triple jump), Dwight Phillips (long jump), Jesse Williams (high jump), and Trey Hardee (decathlon) on the men's team, and Carmelita Jeter (100m), Jennifer Simpson (1500m), Lashinda Demus (400m hurdles), and Brittney Reese (long jump) on the women's team.

2012 Diamond League champions Charonda Williams (200m), Dawn Harper (100m hurdles), Chaunte Lowe (high jump) and Reese Hoffa (shot put) were also automatic qualifiers to the team. World record holder Aries Merritt was also a Diamond League champion in 2012, but a country is only allowed one bye into the championships. The bye into the 110m hurdles was already taken by Jason Richardson, so Merritt had to qualify by placing in the championships.

== Team members ==
=== Men ===
| Athlete | Event | Preliminaries | | Heats | | Semifinals | | Final | |
| Athlete | Event | Time Width Height | Rank | Time Width Height | Rank | Time Width Height | Rank | Time Width Height | Rank |
|---|---|---|---|---|---|---|---|---|---|
| Justin Gatlin | 100 metres | | | 9.99 | 2 Q | 9.94 | 5 Q | 9.85 | 2nd place, silver medalist(s) |
| Mike Rodgers | 100 metres | | | 9.98 | 1 Q | 9.93 | 4 Q | 10.04 | 6 |
| Charles Silmon | 100 metres | | | 10.34 | 35 | Did not advance | | | |
| Curtis Mitchell | 200 metres | | | | | | | 20.04 | 2nd place, silver medalist(s) |
| Wallace Spearmon, Jr. | 200 metres | | | | | | | | |
| Isiah Young | 200 metres | | | | | | | | |
| LaShawn Merritt | 400 metres | | | | | | | 43.74 | 1st place, gold medalist(s) |
| Tony McQuay | 400 metres | | | | | | | 44.40 | 2nd place, silver medalist(s) |
| Arman Hall | 400 metres | | | | | | | | |
| Nicholas Symmonds | 800 metres | | | 1:46.90 | 18 Q | 1:45.00 | 9 Q | 1:43.55 | 2nd place, silver medalist(s) |
| Duane Solomon | 800 metres | | | 1:45.80 | 4 Q | 1:43.87 | 1 Q | 1:44.42 | 6 |
| Brandon Johnson | 800 metres | | | 1:46.32 | 10Q | 1:44.89 | 7 | Did not advance | |
| Matthew Centrowitz, Jr. | 1500 metres | | | | | | | 3:36.78 | 2nd place, silver medalist(s) |
| Leonel Manzano | 1500 metres | | | | | | | | |
| Lopez Lomong | 1500 metres | | | | | | | | |
| Bernard Lagat | 5000 metres | | | | | | | | |
| Galen Rupp | 5000 metres | | | | | | | | |
| Ryan Hill | 5000 metres | | | | | | | | |
| Galen Rupp | 10,000 metres | | | | | | | 27:24.39 | 4 |
| Dathan Ritzenhein | 10,000 metres | | | | | | | 27:37.90 | 10 |
| Daniel Tapia | Marathon | | | | | | | | |
| Jeffrey Eggleston | Marathon | | | | | | | | |
| Carlos Trujillo | Marathon | | | | | | | | |
| Jason Richardson | 110 m hurdles | | | 13.33 | Q | 13.34 | Q | 13.27 | 4 |
| David Oliver | 110 m hurdles | | | 13.05 | Q | 13.18 | Q | 13.00 | 1st place, gold medalist(s) |
| Aries Merritt | 110 m hurdles | | | 13.32 | Q | 13.44 | Q | 13.31 | 6 |
| Ryan Wilson | 110 m hurdles | | | 13.37 | Q | 13.20 | Q | 13.13 | 2nd place, silver medalist(s) |
| Bershawn Jackson | 400 m hurdles | | | | | | | | |
| Michael Tinsley | 400 m hurdles | | | | | | | 47.70 | 2nd place, silver medalist(s) |
| Kerron Clement | 400 m hurdles | | | | | | | | |
| Daniel Huling | 3000 metres steeplechase | | | | | | | | |
| Evan Jager | 3000 metres steeplechase | | | | | | | | |
| De'Sean Turner | 3000 metres steeplechase | | | | | | | | |
| Charles Silmon; Justin Gatlin; Mike Rodgers; Rakieem "Mookie" Salaam; Dentarius Locke; Jeff Demps | 4 x 100 metres relay | | | | | | | 37.66 | 2nd place, silver medalist(s) |
| David Verburg; Arman Hall; Tony McQuay; LaShawn Merritt; Josh Mance; James Harris | 4 x 400 metres relay | | | | | | | 2:58.71 | 1st place, gold medalist(s) |
| Tim Seaman | 20 kilometres walk | | | | | | | | |
| Dwight Phillips | Long jump | | | | | | | | |
| George Kitchens Jr. | Long jump | | | | | | | | |
| Marquis Dendy | Long jump | | | | | | | | |
| Christian Taylor | Triple jump | | | | | | | | |
| William Claye | Triple jump | | | | | | | | |
| Omar Craddock | Triple jump | | | | | | | | |
| Jesse Williams | High jump | | | | | | | | |
| Erik Kynard | High jump | | | | | | | | |
| Dustin Jonas | High jump | | | | | | | | |
| Keith Moffatt | High jump | | | | | | | | |
| Jeremy Scott | Pole vault | | | | | | | | |
| Brad Walker | Pole vault | | | | | | | | |
| Jack Whitt | Pole vault | | | | | | | | |
| Reese Hoffa | Shot put | | | | | | | | |
| Ryan Whiting | Shot put | | | | | | | | |
| Zack Lloyd | Shot put | | | | | | | | |
| Cory Martin | Shot put | | | | | | | | |
| Lance Brooks | Discus throw | | | | | | | | |
| A.G. Kruger | Hammer throw | | | | | | | | |
| Riley Dolezal | Javelin throw | | | | | | | | |
| Sam Humphreys | Javelin throw | | | | | | | | |

Decathlon

| Trey Hardee | Decathlon | | | |
| Trey Hardee | Event | Results | Points | Rank |
|---|---|---|---|---|
| | 100 m | 10.52 | 970 | 3 |
| | Long jump | 7.35 | 898 | 16 |
| | Shot put | 14.61 | 766 | 8 |
| | High jump | NM | DNF | DNF |
| | 400 m | | | DNS |
| | 110 m hurdles | | | DNS |
| | Discus throw | | | DNS |
| | Pole vault | | | DNS |
| | Javelin throw | | | DNS |
| | 1500 m | | | DNS |
| Total | | | | DNF |

| Ashton Eaton | Decathlon | | | |
| Ashton Eaton | Event | Results | Points | Rank |
|---|---|---|---|---|
| | 100 m | 10.35 | 1011 | 1 |
| | Long jump | 7.73 | 992 | 3 |
| | Shot put | 14.39 | 752 | 12 |
| | High jump | 1.93 | 740 | 22 |
| | 400 m | 46.02 | 1007 | 1 |
| | 110 m hurdles | 13.72 | 1011 | 1 |
| | Discus throw | 45.00 | 767 | 12 |
| | Pole vault | 5.20 SB | 972 | 3 |
| | Javelin throw | 64.83 | 811 | 10 |
| | 1500 m | 4:2.80 | 746 | 9 |
| Total | | | 8809 | 1st place, gold medalist(s) |

| Gunnar Nixon | Decathlon | | | |
| Gunnar Nixon | Event | Results | Points | Rank |
|---|---|---|---|---|
| | 100 m | 10.84 | 897 | 8 |
| | Long jump | 7.80 | 1010 | 2 |
| | Shot put | 14.68 | 770 | 7 |
| | High jump | | | |
| | 400 m | | | |
| | 110 m hurdles | | | |
| | Discus throw | | | |
| | Pole vault | | | |
| | Javelin throw | | | |
| | 1500 m | | | |
| Total | | | | |

| Jeremy Taiwo | Decathlon | | | |
| Jeremy Taiwo | Event | Results | Points | Rank |
|---|---|---|---|---|
| | 100 m | 10.96 | 870 | 12 |
| | Long jump | 7.53 | 942 | 7 |
| | Shot put | 12.99 | 667 | 31 |
| | High jump | | | |
| | 400 m | | | |
| | 110 m hurdles | | | |
| | Discus throw | | | |
| | Pole vault | | | |
| | Javelin throw | | | |
| | 1500 m | | | |
| Total | | | | |

=== Women ===
| Athlete | Event | Preliminaries | | Heats | | Semifinals | | Final | |
| Athlete | Event | Time Width Height | Rank | Time Width Height | Rank | Time Width Height | Rank | Time Width Height | Rank |
|---|---|---|---|---|---|---|---|---|---|
| Carmelita Jeter | 100 metres | | | | | | | | |
| English Gardner | 100 metres | | | | | | | | |
| Octavious Freeman | 100 metres | | | | | | | | |
| Alexandria Anderson | 100 metres | | | | | | | | |
| Charonda Williams | 200 metres | | | | | | | | |
| Allyson Felix | 200 metres | | | | | | | | |
| Kimberlyn Duncan | 200 metres | | | | | | | | |
| Jeneba Tarmoh | 200 metres | | | | | | | | |
| Natasha Hastings | 400 metres | | | | | | | | |
| Francena McCorory | 400 metres | | | | | | | | |
| Ashley Spencer | 400 metres | | | | | | | | |
| Alysia Montaño | 800 metres | | | | | | | | |
| Brenda Martinez | 800 metres | | | | | | | | |
| Ajeé Wilson | 800 metres | | | | | | | | |
| Jennifer Simpson | 1500 metres | | | | | | | | |
| Treniere Moser | 1500 metres | | | | | | | | |
| Mary Cain | 1500 metres | | | | | | | | |
| Cory McGee | 1500 metres | | | | | | | | |
| Shannon Rowbury | 5000 metres | | | | | | | | |
| Kim Conley | 5000 metres | | | | | | | | |
| Molly Huddle | 5000 metres | | | | | | | | |
| Shalane Flanagan | 10,000 metres | | | | | | | | |
| Jordan Hasay | 10,000 metres | | | | | | | | |
| Amy Hastings | 10,000 metres | | | | | | | | |
| Tera Moody | Marathon | | | | | | | | |
| Dot McMahon | Marathon | | | | | | | | |
| Jeannette Faber | Marathon | | | | | | | | |
| Deena Kastor | Marathon | | | | | | | | |
| Brianna Rollins | 100 m hurdles | | | | | | | | |
| Dawn Harper | 100 m hurdles | | | | | | | | |
| Queen Harrison | 100 m hurdles | | | | | | | | |
| Nia Ali | 100 m hurdles | | | | | | | | |
| Lashinda Demus | 400 m hurdles | | | | | | | | |
| Dalilah Muhammad | 400 m hurdles | | | | | | | | |
| Georganne Moline | 400 m hurdles | | | | | | | | |
| Christine Spence | 400 m hurdles | | | | | | | | |
| Nicole Bush | 3000 metres steeplechase | | | | | | | | |
| Ashley Higginson | 3000 metres steeplechase | | | | | | | | |
| Shalaya Kipp | 3000 metres steeplechase | | | | | | | | |
| English Gardner; Octavious Freeman; Alexandria Anderson; Jeneba Tarmoh; Barbara Pierre; Aurieyall Scott | 4 x 100 metres relay | | | | | | | | |
| Ashley Spencer; Joanna Atkins; Jessica Beard; Francena McCorory; Natasha Hastings; Rebecca Alexander | 4 x 400 metres relay | | | | | | | | |
| Maria Michta | 20 kilometres walk | | | | | | | | |
| Erin Gray | 20 kilometres walk | | | | | | | | |
| Miranda Melville | 20 kilometres walk | | | | | | | | |
| Brittney Reese | Long jump | 6.57 | 12 q | | | | | 7.01 | 1st place, gold medalist(s) |
| Janay DeLoach-Soukup | Long jump | 6.58 | 11 q | | | | | 6.44 | 11 |
| Funmi Jimoh | Long jump | 6.57 | 13 | | | | | Did not advance | |
| Tori Polk | Long jump | 6.75 | 3 Q | | | | | 6.73 | 8 |
| Chaunte Lowe | High jump | | | | | | | | |
| Brigetta Barrett | High jump | | | | | | | | |
| Inika McPherson | High jump | | | | | | | | |
| Jennifer Suhr | Pole vault | | | | | | | | |
| Kylie Hutson | Pole vault | | | | | | | | |
| Becky Holliday | Pole vault | | | | | | | | |
| Tia Brooks | Shot put | | | | | | | | |
| Michelle Carter | Shot put | | | | | | | | |
| Alyssa Hasslen | Shot put | | | | | | | | |
| Elizabeth Podomonick | Discus throw | | | | | | | | |
| Whitney Ashley | Discus throw | | | | | | | | |
| Gia Lewis-Smallwood | Discus throw | | | | | | | | |
| Amanda Bingson | Hammer throw | | | | | | | | |
| Amber Campbell | Hammer throw | | | | | | | | |
| Jeneva McCall | Hammer throw | | | | | | | | |
| Brittany Borman | Javelin throw | | | | | | | | |
| Kara Patterson | Javelin throw | | | | | | | | |

Heptathlon

| Sharon Day | Heptathlon | | | |
| Sharon Day | Event | Results | Points | Rank |
|---|---|---|---|---|
| | 100 m hurdles | | | |
| | High jump | | | |
| | Shot put | | | |
| | 200 m | | | |
| | Long jump | | | |
| | Javelin throw | | | |
| | 800 m | | | |
| Total | | | | |

| Bettie Wade | Heptathlon | | | |
| Bettie Wade | Event | Results | Points | Rank |
|---|---|---|---|---|
| | 100 m hurdles | | | |
| | High jump | | | |
| | Shot put | | | |
| | 200 m | | | |
| | Long jump | | | |
| | Javelin throw | | | |
| | 800 m | | | |
| Total | | | | |

| Erica Bougard | Heptathlon | | | |
| Erica Bougard | Event | Results | Points | Rank |
|---|---|---|---|---|
| | 100 m hurdles | | | |
| | High jump | | | |
| | Shot put | | | |
| | 200 m | | | |
| | Long jump | | | |
| | Javelin throw | | | |
| | 800 m | | | |
| Total | | | | |

== See also ==
United States at other World Championships in 2013

- United States at the 2013 UCI Road World Championships
- United States at the 2013 World Aquatics Championships
