= 2013 World Championships in Athletics – Women's 100 metres =

Event of 2013 World Championship

Women's 100 metres at the 2013 World Championships
- Venue: Luzhniki Stadium
- Dates: 11 August (heats); 12 August (semifinals & final)
- Competitors: 45 from 32 nations
- Winning time: 10.71

Medalists
gold medal	Shelly-Ann Fraser-Pryce; Jamaica
silver medal	Murielle Ahouré; Ivory Coast
bronze medal	Carmelita Jeter; United States

The women's 100 metres at the 2013 World Championships in Athletics was held at the Luzhniki Stadium on 11–12 August and was won by 0.22 seconds by Shelly-Ann Fraser-Pryce. As of 2024, this is the greatest winning margin in the women's 100 metres at these championships and the only time this event has been won by two-tenths of a second.

In the first round, English Gardner won her third heat decisively in a time of 10.94 seconds. Others qualified for the semifinal round in up to 11.41 seconds. The semis were faster, since although the first was slowest at 11.08, the other two were won in under 11 seconds, with the fastest time qualifier Alexandria Anderson at 11.01.

In the final, there was no doubt who would win as Shelly-Ann Fraser-Pryce shot out of the block leaving nothing but a pink streak (hair and shoes) for her competitors to follow. Jeter's 10.94 was the same as Gardner's time in the heats. But Gardner only had 10.97 left for the final to miss a medal. Slow reacting Kerron Stewart gave up .06 at the start line but lost the silver medal by only .04.

== Records ==
Prior to the competition, the records were as follows:

World record	Florence Griffith-Joyner (USA)	10.49	Indianapolis, IN, United States	16 July 1988
Championship record	Marion Jones (USA)	10.70	Seville, Spain	28 August 1999
World Leading	Shelly-Ann Fraser-Pryce (JAM)	10.77	London, United Kingdom	27 July 2013
African Record	Blessing Okagbare (NGR)	10.79	London, United Kingdom	27 July 2013
Asian Record	Li Xuemei (CHN)	10.79	Shanghai, People's Republic of China	18 October 1997
North, Central American and Caribbean record	Florence Griffith-Joyner (USA)	10.49	Indianapolis, IN, United States	16 July 1988
South American record	Ana Claudia Silva (BRA)	11.05	Belém, Brazil	12 May 2013
European Record	Christine Arron (FRA)	10.73	Budapest, Hungary	19 August 1998
Oceanian record	Melinda Gainsford-Taylor (AUS)	11.12A	Sestriere, Italy	31 July 1994

== Qualification standards ==
A time	B time
11.28	11.36

== Schedule ==
Date	Time	Round
11 August 2013	11:55	Heats
12 August 2013	19:35	Semifinals
12 August 2013	21:50	Final

All times are local times (UTC+4)

== Results ==
KEY:	Q	Qualified	q	Fastest non-qualifiers	NR	National record	PB	Personal best	SB	Seasonal best

=== Heats ===
Qualification: First 3 in each heat (Q) and the next 6 fastest (q) advanced to the semifinals.

Wind:
Heat 1: −0.3 m/s, Heat 2: −0.4 m/s, Heat 3: −0.5 m/s, Heat 4: −0.3 m/s, Heat 5: −0.6 m/s, Heat 6: −0.6 m/s

Rank	Heat	Name	Nationality	Time	Notes
1	3	English Gardner	United States	10.94	Q
2	2	Kerron Stewart	Jamaica	11.02	Q
3	5	Blessing Okagbare	Nigeria	11.03	Q
4	5	Ana Cláudia Lemos	Brazil	11.08	Q
5	1	Verena Sailer	Germany	11.11	Q
6	2	Alexandria Anderson	United States	11.13	Q
7	4	Shelly-Ann Fraser-Pryce	Jamaica	11.15	Q
8	1	Octavious Freeman	United States	11.16	Q
9	4	Franciela Krasucki	Brazil	11.17	Q
10	3	Ivet Lalova	Bulgaria	11.18	Q
11	5	Schillonie Calvert	Jamaica	11.20	Q
12	6	Murielle Ahouré	Ivory Coast	11.22	Q
13	1	Ezinne Okparaebo	Norway	11.23	Q, SB
14	6	Carmelita Jeter	United States	11.24	Q
15	4	Gloria Asumnu	Nigeria	11.27	Q, SB
16	4	Nataliya Pohrebnyak	Ukraine	11.28	q
17	2	Asha Philip	Great Britain & N.I.	11.29	Q
18	3	Sheri-Ann Brooks	Jamaica	11.32	Q
19	6	Sheniqua Ferguson	Bahamas	11.33	Q
20	3	Myriam Soumaré	France	11.34	q
21	4	Michelle-Lee Ahye	Trinidad and Tobago	11.37	q
22	2	Tatjana Pinto	Germany	11.38	q
23	1	Mariely Sánchez	Dominican Republic	11.41	q
23	1	Olesya Povh	Ukraine	11.41	q
25	5	Stella Akakpo	France	11.43	
26	5	Hanna-Maari Latvala	Finland	11.45	
27	3	Melissa Breen	Australia	11.47	
28	2	Lina Grinčikaitė	Lithuania	11.48	
29	6	Angela Tenorio	Ecuador	11.53	
30	3	Cache Armbrister	Bahamas	11.55	
31	4	Toea Wisil	Papua New Guinea	11.61	
31	2	Tahesia Harrigan	British Virgin Islands	11.61	
33	5	Katsiaryna Hanchar	Belarus	11.63	
34	1	Kateřina Čechová	Czech Republic	11.67	
34	6	Stephanie Kalu	Nigeria	11.67	
36	4	Fong Yee Pui	Hong Kong	12.15	
37	2	Lovelite Detenamo	Nauru	12.35	SB
38	5	Vladislava Ovcharenko	Tajikistan	12.37	
39	6	Patricia Taea	Cook Islands	12.39	
40	1	Yvonne Nalishuwa	Zambia	12.47	
41	3	Martina Pretelli	San Marino	12.73	
42	2	Hereiti Bernardino	French Polynesia	12.84	PB
43	6	Rubie Joy Gabriel	Palau	13.25	PB
44	3	Kabotaake Romeri	Kiribati	13.39	PB
45	6	Pauline Kwalea	Solomon Islands	13.53	SB
–	6	Ruddy Zang Milama	Gabon	DNS	

=== Semifinals ===
Qualification: First 2 in each heat (Q) and the next 2 fastest (q) advanced to the final.

Wind: Heat 1: −0.4 m/s, Heat 2: −0.4 m/s, Heat 3: −0.1 m/s

Rank	Heat	Lane	Name	Nationality	Time	Notes
1	3	7	Shelly-Ann Fraser-Pryce	Jamaica	10.87	Q
2	2	6	Murielle Ahouré	Ivory Coast	10.95	Q, NR
2	2	7	Carmelita Jeter	United States	10.95	Q, SB
4	3	5	Kerron Stewart	Jamaica	10.97	Q, SB
5	2	4	English Gardner	United States	11.00	q
6	3	6	Alexandria Anderson	United States	11.01	q
7	1	4	Blessing Okagbare	Nigeria	11.08	Q
7	1	6	Octavious Freeman	United States	11.08	Q
9	3	4	Ivet Lalova	Bulgaria	11.10	
10	1	7	Verena Sailer	Germany	11.11	
11	2	5	Ana Cláudia Lemos	Brazil	11.20	
12	1	9	Schillonie Calvert	Jamaica	11.23	
13	3	2	Myriam Soumaré	France	11.26	
14	1	2	Michelle-Lee Ahye	Trinidad and Tobago	11.28	
15	1	5	Franciela Krasucki	Brazil	11.29	
16	3	9	Sheniqua Ferguson	Bahamas	11.30	
17	1	8	Asha Philip	Great Britain & N.I.	11.30	
18	2	2	Nataliya Pohrebnyak	Ukraine	11.31	
19	2	8	Sheri-Ann Brooks	Jamaica	11.35	
20	2	9	Ezinne Okparaebo	Norway	11.36	
21	2	3	Mariely Sánchez	Dominican Republic	11.36	
22	1	3	Olesya Povh	Ukraine	11.38	
23	3	8	Gloria Asumnu	Nigeria	11.39	
24	3	3	Tatjana Pinto	Germany	11.49	

=== Final ===
Wind: −0.3 m/s.

Rank	Lane	Name	Nationality	Time	Notes
1st place, gold medalist(s)	4	Shelly-Ann Fraser-Pryce	Jamaica	10.71	WL
2nd place, silver medalist(s)	6	Murielle Ahouré	Ivory Coast	10.93	NR
3rd place, bronze medalist(s)	5	Carmelita Jeter	United States	10.94	SB
4	2	English Gardner	United States	10.97	
5	8	Kerron Stewart	Jamaica	10.97	
6	7	Blessing Okagbare	Nigeria	11.04	
7	3	Alexandria Anderson	United States	11.10	
8	9	Octavious Freeman	United States	11.16	
