= 2013 USA Outdoor Track and Field Championships =

- Dates: June 20–23
- Host city: Des Moines, Iowa, United States
- Venue: Drake Stadium
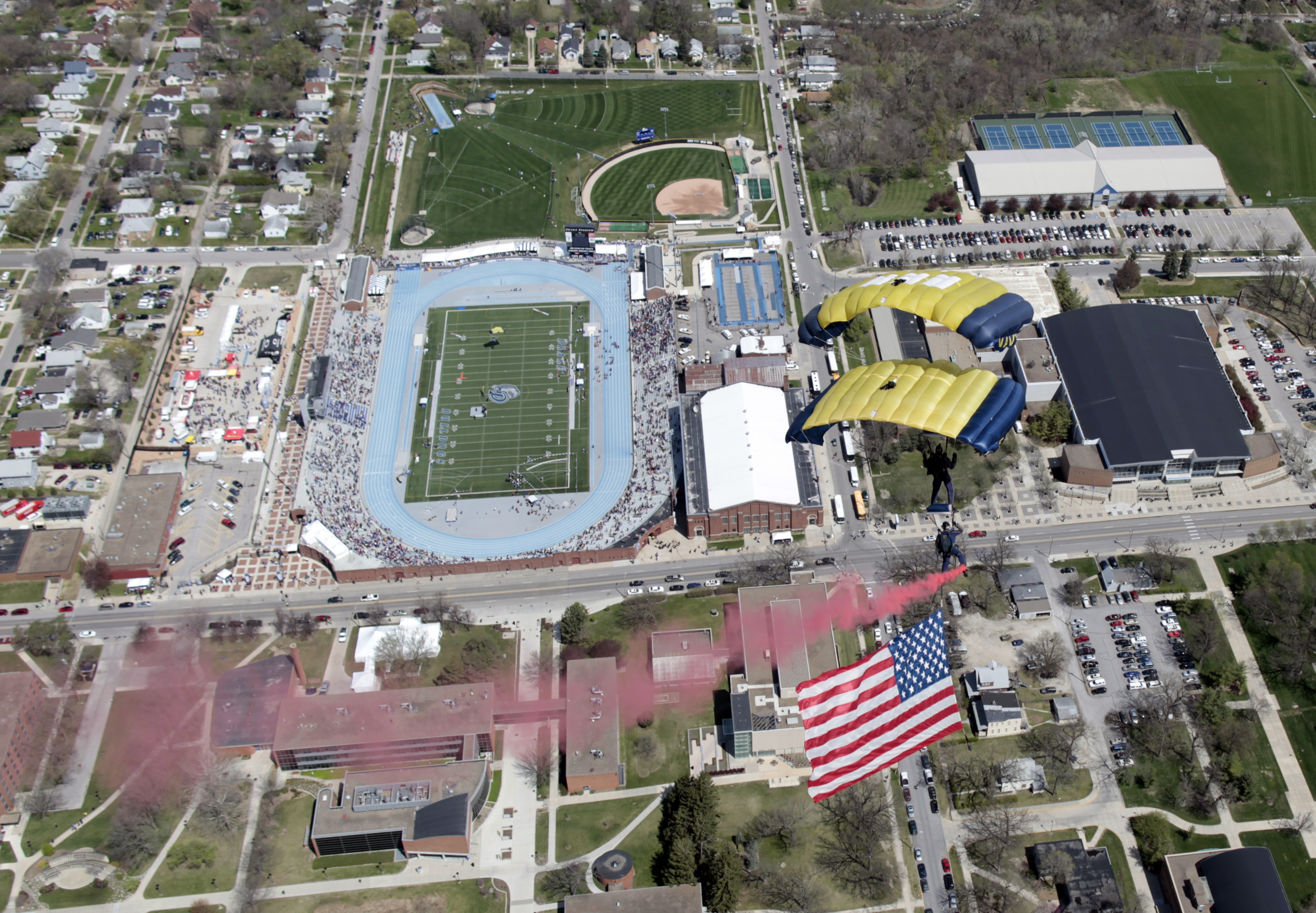
- Level: Senior
- Type: Outdoor
- Events: 40 (men: 20; women: 20)

The 2013 USA Outdoor Track and Field Championships was held at Drake Stadium in Des Moines, Iowa. Organised by USA Track and Field, the four-day competition took place June 20–23 in conjunction with the USA Junior Outdoor Track & Field Championships which started the day before and served as the national championships in track and field for the United States.

The results of the event determined qualification for the American World Championships team at the 2013 World Championships in Athletics to be held in Moscow, Russia from August 10–18. Provided they had achieved (or will achieve before the cutoff date) the World Championships "A" or "B" standard, the top four athletes can gain a place on the World Championships team in an individual event (although only three can compete). Reigning world champions or Diamond League champions (in events where there is no reigning world champion) received a wild card entry to the World Championships, and they did not count against the maximum number of three athletes per event. Standards set at the 2012 Summer Olympics are only acceptable for the 10,000 metres, racewalk and combined events.

== Men's results ==
Key: ≠ Not selected in respective event because of no "A" or "B" standard. However, athletes can still pursue standards following this meet and still make the team provided they attain it before the July 20 cutoff date.

=== Men track events ===
Event	Gold		Silver		Bronze	
100 metres^{[a]}	Justin Gatlin	9.89	Charles Silmon	9.972	Mike Rodgers	9.974
200 metres^{[a]}	Isiah Young	19.86	Curtis Mitchell	19.99	Wallace Spearmon	20.10
400 metres	LaShawn Merritt	44.21	Tony McQuay	44.74	Arman Hall	45.01
800 metres	Duane Solomon	1:43.27	Nick Symmonds	1:43.70	Brandon Johnson	1:43.97
1500 metres	Matthew Centrowitz Jr.	3:45.17	Leonel Manzano	3:45.35	Lopez Lomong	3:45.69
5000 metres^{[b]}	Bernard Lagat	14:54.16	Galen Rupp	14:54.91	Ryan Hill	14:55.16
10,000 metres	Galen Rupp	28:47.32	Dathan Ritzenhein	28:49.66	Chris Derrick	28:52.25
110 metres hurdles^{[c]}	Ryan Wilson	13.08	David Oliver	13.11	Aries Merritt	13.23
400 metres hurdles	Michael Tinsley	47.96	Kerron Clement	48.06	Bershawn Jackson	48.09
3000 metres st.	Evan Jager	8:20.67	Daniel Huling	8:22.62	De'Sean Turner	8:25.56
20 kilometres walk^{[d]}	Tim Seaman	1:30:13.06	John Nunn≠	1:31:01.64	Patrick Stroupe≠	1:31:08.73

=== Men field events ===
Event	Gold		Silver		Bronze	
High jump^{[e]}	Erik Kynard	2.28 m (7 ft 5 3/4 in)	Dusty Jonas	2.28 m (7 ft 5 3/4 in)	Ronnie Black Jr.≠ Montez Blair≠	2.25 m (7 ft 4 1/2 in)
Pole vault	Brad Walker	5.65 m (18 ft 6 1/4 in)	Jeremy Scott	5.65 m (18 ft 6 1/4 in)	Jack Whitt	5.60 m (18 ft 4 1/4 in)
Long jump^{[f]}	George Kitchens	8.23 m (27 ft 0 in)w	Jeffrey Henderson	8.22 m (26 ft 11 1/2 in)	Ronald Taylor Jr.	8.14 m (26 ft 8 1/4 in)
Triple jump^{[g]}	Omar Craddock	17.15 m (56 ft 3 in)	Will Claye	17.04 m (55 ft 10 3/4 in)	Ryan Grinnell	17.02 m (55 ft 10 in)
Shot put^{[h]}	Ryan Whiting	22.11 m (72 ft 6 1/4 in)	Reese Hoffa	21.34 m (70 ft 0 in)	Zack Lloyd	21.09 m (69 ft 2 1/4 in)
Discus throw	Lance Brooks≠	62.29 m (204 ft 4 1/4 in)	Russell Winger≠	62.03 m (203 ft 6 in)	James Plummer≠	61.96 m (203 ft 3 1/4 in)
Hammer throw^{[i]}	A. G. Kruger	75.52 m (247 ft 9 in)	Chris Cralle≠	74.55 m (244 ft 7 in)	Andrew Loftin≠	73.63 m (241 ft 6 3/4 in)
Javelin throw	Riley Dolezal	83.50 m (273 ft 11 1/4 in)	Sam Humphreys	83.14 m (272 ft 9 in)	Sean Furey≠	77.36 m (253 ft 9 1/2 in)
Decathlon^{[j]}	Ashton Eaton	8291	Gunnar Nixon	8198	Jeremy Taiwo	7925

==== Notes ====
^{a} Tyson Gay ran 9.75 in the 100 m final and 19.74 in the 200 m final, finishing first in both events, but his performances were annulled after the race for doping.
^{b} Fourth place Ben True has achieved an "A" standard at the Prefontaine Classic
^{c} Defending world champion Jason Richardson is automatically qualified for the World Championships, displacing Diamond League winner Aries Merritt from automatic qualifying, however Merritt qualified by finishing third.
^{d} Trevor Barron has an "A" standard of 1:22:46 from the 2012 Summer Olympics, while Seaman has a "B" standard from a previous competition.
^{e} Defending world champion Jesse Williams is automatically qualified for the World Championships. As Blair won a administrative jump-off, he will have an opportunity to pursue a standard for the World Championships.
^{f} Defending world champion Dwight Phillips is automatically qualified for the World Championships.
^{g} Olympic and defending world champion Christian Taylor is automatically qualified for the World Championships.
^{h} IAAF Diamond League champion Reese Hoffa is automatically qualified for the World Championships, although he choose to compete. Fourth place finisher Cory Martin (20.67 m (67 ft 9 3/4 in)) also makes the team.
^{i} Kruger has a "B" standard of 77.10 m (252 ft 11 1/4 in) from a previous competition.
^{j} Defending world champion Trey Hardee is automatically qualified for the World Championships. Taiwo has achieved an "A" standard of 8239 from the 2013 NCAA championships.

== Women's results ==
Key: ≠ Not selected in respective event because of no "A" or "B" standard. However, athletes can still pursue standards following this meet and still make the team provided they attain it before the July 20 cutoff date.

=== Women track events ===
Event	Gold		Silver		Bronze	
100 metres^{[i]}	English Gardner	10.85	Octavious Freeman	10.87	Alexandria Anderson	10.91
200 metres^{[j]} (Wind: +3.2 m/s)	Kimberlyn Duncan	21.80w	Allyson Felix	21.85w	Jeneba Tarmoh	22.15w
400 metres	Natasha Hastings	49.94	Francena McCorory	50.01	Ashley Spencer	50.58
800 metres	Alysia Montaño	1:58.67	Brenda Martinez	1:58.78	Ajeé Wilson	1:59.55
1500 metres^{[k]}	Treniere Moser	4:28.62	Mary Cain	4:28.76	Cory McGee≠	4:29.70
5000 metres	Jennifer Simpson	15:33.77	Molly Huddle	15:35.45	Shannon Rowbury	15:37.27
10,000 metres^{[l]}	Shalane Flanagan	31:43.20	Jordan Hasay	32:17.34	Tara Erdmann≠	32:24.16
100 metres hurdles^{[m]}	Brianna Rollins	12.26 NR	Queen Harrison	12.43	Nia Ali	12.48
400 metres hurdles^{[n]}	Dalilah Muhammad	53.83	Georganne Moline	53.88	Christine Spence	54.56
3000 metres st.	Nicole Bush	9:44.53	Ashley Higginson	9:46.25	Shalaya Kipp≠	9:46.83
20 kilometres walk	Maria Michta	1:37:34.46	Erin Gray≠	1:39:19.80	Miranda Melville≠	1:40:38.14

=== Women field events ===
Event	Gold		Silver		Bronze	
High jump^{[o]}	Brigetta Barrett	2.04 m (6 ft 8 1/4 in)	Inika McPherson	1.92 m (6 ft 3 1/2 in)	Maya Pressley≠	1.89 m (6 ft 2 1/4 in)
Pole vault	Jenn Suhr	4.70 m (15 ft 5 in)	Kylie Hutson	4.60 m (15 ft 1 in)	Becky Holliday	4.55 m (14 ft 11 in)
Long jump^{[p]}	Janay DeLoach	6.89 m (22 ft 7 1/4 in)	Tori Polk	6.80 m (22 ft 3 1/2 in)	Funmi Jimoh	6.71 m (22 ft 0 in)
Triple jump	Andrea Geubelle≠	14.03 m (46 ft 1/4 in) (w)	Toni Smith≠	13.93 m (45 ft 8 1/4 in)	Amanda Smock≠	13.77 m (45 ft 2 in)
Shot put	Michelle Carter	20.24 m (66 ft 4 3/4 in) NR	Tia Brooks	18.83 m (61 ft 9 1/4 in)	Alyssa Hasslen	18.10 m (59 ft 4 1/2 in)
Discus throw^{[q]}	Gia Lewis-Smallwood	65.13 m (213 ft 8 in)	Whitney Ashley	61.19 m (200 ft 9 in)	Elizabeth Podominick	60.69 m (199 ft 1 1/4 in)
Hammer throw	Amanda Bingson	75.73 m (248 ft 5 1/4 in) NR	Jeneva McCall	74.00 m (242 ft 9 1/4 in)	Amber Campbell	73.03 m (239 ft 7 in)
Javelin throw	Brittany Borman	60.91 m (199 ft 10 in)	Ariana Ince≠	56.66 m (185 ft 10 1/2 in)	Kara Patterson≠	55.88 m (183 ft 4 in)
Heptathlon	Sharon Day	6550	Bettie Wade	6018	Erica Bougard	5990

==== Notes ====
^{i} Defending world champion Carmelita Jeter is automatically qualified for the World Championships.
^{j} IAAF Diamond League champion Charonda Williams is automatically qualified for the World Championships.
^{k} Defending world champion Jennifer Simpson is automatically qualified for the World Championships. Moser, Cain and sixth place finisher Sarah Brown have "A" standards from previous competitions. McGee achieved a "B" standard on July 13.
^{l} Fourth place finisher Amy Hastings (32:31.28) and ninth place finisher Lisa Uhl (33:35.80) has an "A" standard from the London Olympics.
^{m} IAAF Diamond League champion Dawn Harper is automatically qualified for the World Championships.
^{n} Defending world champion Lashinda Demus is automatically qualified for the World Championships.
^{o} IAAF Diamond League champion Chaunté Lowe is automatically qualified for the World Championships.
^{p} Olympic and defending world champion Brittney Reese is automatically qualified for the World Championships.
^{q} Lewis-Smallwood, Podominick and sixth place Aretha Thurmond have "A" qualifiers, Ashley has a "B"

== Results ==
- Results at USATF

== Daily reports ==
- Rupp, Flanagan win 10,000m finals at USA Outdoor Track & Field Championships. USA Track & Field. Retrieved on 2013-06-20.
- Gay’s 9.75 leads Quartet of World Leading Marks at USA Outdoor Championships. USA Track & Field. Retrieved on 2013-06-21.
- Four American Records on Magnificent Saturday at Outdoor Championships. USA Track & Field. Retrieved on 2013-06-22.
- Upsets and Breakthroughs on Final Day of USA Outdoor Championships. USA Track & Field. Retrieved on 2013-06-23.
