= Nigeria at the 2013 World Championships in Athletics =

- WA code: NGR

in Moscow
- Competitors: 999
- Medals: Gold 0 Silver 1 Bronze 1 Total 2

World Championships in Athletics appearances
- 1983; 1987; 1991; 1993; 1995; 1997; 1999; 2001; 2003; 2005; 2007; 2009; 2011; 2013; 2015; 2017; 2019; 2022; 2023; 2025

Nigeria competed at the 2013 World Championships in Athletics in Moscow, Russia, from 10 to 18 August 2013. A team of 17 athletes was announced to represent the country in the event.

== Results ==
(q – qualified, NM – no mark, SB – season best)

=== Men ===
Track and road events

Athlete	Event	Preliminaries		Heats		Semifinals		Final	
Athlete	Event	Time	Rank	Time	Rank	Time	Rank	Time	Rank
Ogho-Oghene Egwero	100 metres								
Noah Akwu; Gerald Oghenemega Odeka; Tobi Ogunmola; Abiola Onakoya; Isah Salihu	4 × 400 metres relay								

Field events

Athlete	Event	Preliminaries		Final	
Athlete	Event	Width Height	Rank	Width Height	Rank
Tosin Oke	Triple jump				

=== Women ===
Track and road events

Athlete	Event	Preliminaries		Heats		Semifinals		Final	
Athlete	Event	Time	Rank	Time	Rank	Time	Rank	Time	Rank
Gloria Asumnu	100 metres								
Stephanie Kalu	100 metres								
Blessing Okagbare	100 metres								
Blessing Okagbare	200 metres					22.39	2	22.32	3
Regina George	400 metres			51.01	2	50.84	3		
Ugonna Ndu	400 metres								
Omolara Omotoso	400 metres								
Muizat Ajoke Odumosu	400 metres hurdles								
Blessing Okagbare; Gloria Asumnu; Stephanie Kalu; Alphonsus Peace Uko	4 × 100 metres relay								
Bukola Abogunloko; Josephine Ehigie; Patience Okon George; Regina George; Omolara Omotoso	4 × 400 metres relay								

Field events

Athlete	Event	Preliminaries		Final	
Athlete	Event	Width Height	Rank	Width Height	Rank
Blessing Okagbare	Long jump			6.99	2
