= Hayley Jones =

Hayley Jones is the name of:

- Hayley Jones (sprinter) (born 1988), British sprinter
- Hayley Jones (cyclist) (born 1995), Welsh racing cyclist

== See also ==
- Haley Jones (born 2001), American basketball player
