= 2013 World Championships in Athletics – Women's 4 × 100 metres relay =

Women's 4 × 100 metres relay at the 2013 World Championships
- Venue: Luzhniki Stadium
- Dates: 18 August (heats & final)
- Competitors: 76 from 19 nations
- Winning time: 41.29

Medalists
gold medal	Carrie Russell; Kerron Stewart; Schillonie Calvert; Shelly-Ann Fraser-Pryce; Sheri-Ann Brooks; Jamaica
silver medal	Jeneba Tarmoh; Alexandria Anderson; English Gardner; Octavious Freeman; United States
bronze medal	Dina Asher-Smith; Ashleigh Nelson; Annabelle Lewis; Hayley Jones; Great Britain & N.I.

Official Video

The women's 4 × 100 metres relay at the 2013 World Championships in Athletics was held at the Luzhniki Stadium on 18 August. Jamaica claimed gold, ahead of the United States and Great Britain and Northern Ireland.

== Summary ==
In the final, Jamaica and the United States were out early, Jamaica passing first. The British team seemed to be keeping up with the leaders, passing efficiently. At the second handoff, English Gardner seemed to leave even with Schillonie Calvert, while Alexandria Anderson had not arrived with the baton yet. Gardner had to come to a complete stop at the end of the zone to wait for the baton, finally resuming with a legal handoff in dead last place. Inside of USA, France was having similar difficulties with the baton. By the final handoff, Jamaica had an 8-meter lead on the second place Russian team, Gold medalist Shelly-Ann Fraser-Pryce on the anchor pulling away and victory assured. Jamaica dominated the race finishing with a championship record 41.29. Coming down the straight, Britain's Hayley Jones was swallowed up by France's Stella Akakpo, Germany's Verena Sailer and American Octavious Freeman speeding from the back trying to make up lost ground. Freeman was able to pass three teams in the last few steps but France beat USA to the line.

The French relay team members were duly presented their silver medals during the medal ceremony. After the medal ceremony, the British team filed a protest against the French team, claiming that the latter had an out-of-zone baton handover between Ayodelé Ikuesan and Myriam Soumaré. More than two hours after the race, the French relay team was officially disqualified. The French delegation appealed against their disqualification, but it was in vain. Consequently, the American team was upgraded to the silver medal and the British team received the bronze medal. Bernard Amsalem, the president of the Fédération française d'athlétisme, called the French team's disqualification "an outrage". He explained that normally the decision to disqualify a team had to be made before the medal ceremony and teams had to file protests within thirty minutes from the end of the race.

With this 4 × 100 m victory, Shelly-Ann Fraser-Pryce became the first woman to win the sprint triple (100, 200, 4 × 100) at the World Athletics Championships. The winning margin was 1.46 seconds, which as of 2024 is the only time this women's relay race has been won by more than one second at these championships.

== Records ==
Prior to the competition, the records were as follows:

World record	United States (Tianna Madison, Allyson Felix, Bianca Knight, Carmelita Jeter)	40.82	London, United Kingdom	10 August 2012
Championship record	United States (Chryste Gaines, Marion Jones, Inger Miller, Gail Devers)	41.47	Athens, Greece	9 August 1997
World leading	United States Red (English Gardner, Octavious Freeman, Allyson Felix, Carmelita Jeter)	41.75	Monaco	19 July 2013
African record	Nigeria (Beatrice Utondu, Faith Idehen, Christy Opara-Thompson, Mary Onyali-Omagbemi)	42.39	Barcelona, Spain	7 August 1992
Asian record	People's Republic of China (Xiao Lin, Li Yali, Liu Xiaomei, Li Xuemei)	42.23	Shanghai, People's Republic of China	23 October 1997
North, Central American and Caribbean record	United States (Tianna Madison, Allyson Felix, Bianca Knight, Carmelita Jeter)	40.82	London, United Kingdom	10 August 2012
South American record	Brazil (Ana Claudia Silva, Franciela Krasucki, Evelyn dos Santos, Rosângela Santos)	42.55	London, United Kingdom	9 August 2012
European record	East Germany (Silke Gladisch-Möller, Sabine Rieger, Ingrid Auerswald-Lange, Marlies Göhr)	41.37	Canberra, Australia	6 October 1985
Oceanian record	Australia (Rachael Massey, Suzanne Broadrick, Jodi Lambert, Melinda Gainsford-Taylor)	42.99	Pietersburg, South Africa	18 March 2000

== Qualification standards ==
Time
44.00

== Schedule ==
Date	Time	Round
18 August 2013	16:15	Heats
18 August 2013	18:10	Final

All times are local times (UTC+4)

== Results ==
KEY:	Q	Qualified	q	Fastest non-qualifiers	NR	National record	PB	Personal best	SB	Seasonal best

=== Heats ===
Qualification: First 2 of each heat (Q) plus the 2 fastest times (q) advanced to the final.

Rank	Heat	Lane	Nation	Athletes	Time	Notes
1	3	4	United States	Jeneba Tarmoh, Alexandria Anderson, English Gardner, Octavious Freeman	41.82	Q
2	1	4	Jamaica	Carrie Russell, Kerron Stewart, Schillonie Calvert, Sheri-Ann Brooks	41.87	Q, SB
3	1	3	France	Céline Distel-Bonnet, Ayodelé Ikuesan, Myriam Soumaré, Stella Akakpo	42.25	Q
4	3	2	Brazil	Evelyn dos Santos, Ana Cláudia Lemos, Franciela Krasucki, Rosângela Santos	42.29	Q, AR
5	1	6	Germany	Yasmin Kwadwo, Inna Weit, Tatjana Pinto, Verena Sailer	42.65	q, SB
6	2	5	Great Britain & N.I.	Dina Asher-Smith, Ashleigh Nelson, Annabelle Lewis, Hayley Jones	42.75	Q
7	3	6	Russia	Olga Belkina, Natalia Rusakova, Elizaveta Savlinis, Yelena Bolsun	42.94	q, SB
8	2	7	Canada	Crystal Emmanuel, Kimberly Hyacinthe, Shai-Anne Davis, Khamica Bingham	42.99	Q, NR
9	3	3	Trinidad and Tobago	Kamaria Durant, Michelle-Lee Ahye, Reyare Thomas, Kai Selvon	43.01	SB
10	2	2	Ukraine	Olesya Povh, Nataliya Pohrebnyak, Mariya Ryemyen, Yelyzaveta Bryzhina	43.12	
11	3	7	Poland	Marika Popowicz, Weronika Wedler, Ewelina Ptak, Marta Jeschke	43.18	SB
12	2	3	Switzerland	Mujinga Kambundji, Marisa Lavanchy, Ellen Sprunger, Léa Sprunger	43.21	NR
13	1	5	Netherlands	Kadene Vassell, Dafne Schippers, Madiea Ghafoor, Jamile Samuel	43.26	SB
14	1	2	Dominican Republic	Mariely Sánchez, Fany Chalas, Marleni Mejia, Margarita Manzueta	43.28	NR
15	3	8	Colombia	Yomara Hinestroza, María Alejandra Idrobo, Darlenys Obregón, Eliecith Palacios	43.65	SB
16	2	4	Italy	Audrey Alloh, Marzia Caravelli, Ilenia Draisci, Martina Amidei	44.05	
17	3	5	China	Tao Yujia, Li Meijuan, Liang Xiaojing, Wei Yongli	44.22	
	1	7	Nigeria	Alphonsus Peace Uko, Patience Okon George, Stephanie Kalu, Regina George	DQ	R170.7
	2	6	Bahamas	Sheniqua Ferguson, Shaunae Miller, Cache Armbrister, Debbie Ferguson-McKenzie	DQ	R163.3(a)

=== Final ===
The final was started at 18:10.

Rank	Lane	Nation	Athletes	Time	Notes
1st place, gold medalist(s)	6	Jamaica	Carrie Russell, Kerron Stewart, Schillonie Calvert, Shelly-Ann Fraser-Pryce	41.29	CR
2nd place, silver medalist(s)	5	United States	Jeneba Tarmoh, Alexandria Anderson, English Gardner, Octavious Freeman	42.75	
3rd place, bronze medalist(s)	3	Great Britain & N.I.	Dina Asher-Smith, Ashleigh Nelson, Annabelle Lewis, Hayley Jones	42.87	
4	1	Germany	Yasmin Kwadwo, Inna Weit, Tatjana Pinto, Verena Sailer	42.90	
5	2	Russia	Olga Belkina, Natalia Rusakova, Elizaveta Savlinis, Yelena Bolsun	42.93	SB
6	7	Canada	Crystal Emmanuel, Kimberly Hyacinthe, Shai-Anne Davis, Khamica Bingham	43.28	
	4	France	Céline Distel-Bonnet, Ayodelé Ikuesan, Myriam Soumaré, Stella Akakpo	DQ (42.73)	R170.7
	8	Brazil	Evelyn dos Santos, Ana Cláudia Lemos, Franciela Krasucki, Vanda Gomes	DNF	
