= Switzerland at the 2013 World Championships in Athletics =

- WA code: SUI

in Moscow
- Competitors: 18
- Medals: Gold 0 Silver 0 Bronze 0 Total 0

World Championships in Athletics appearances
- 1976; 1980; 1983; 1987; 1991; 1993; 1995; 1997; 1999; 2001; 2003; 2005; 2007; 2009; 2011; 2013; 2015; 2017; 2019; 2022; 2023; 2025

Switzerland competed at the 2013 World Championships in Athletics in Moscow, Russia, from 10 to 18 August 2013. A team of 18 athletes was announced to represent the country in the event.

== Results ==
(q – qualified, NM – no mark, SB – season best)

=== Men ===
Track and road events

Athlete	Event	Preliminaries		Heats		Semifinals		Final	
Athlete	Event	Time	Rank	Time	Rank	Time	Rank	Time	Rank
Alex Wilson	200 metres								
Christian Kreienbuhl	Marathon								
Michael Ott	Marathon								
Alejandro Francisco Florez	20 kilometres walk								

=== Women ===
Track and road events

Athlete	Event	Preliminaries		Heats		Semifinals		Final	
Athlete	Event	Time	Rank	Time	Rank	Time	Rank	Time	Rank
Mujinga Kambundji	200 metres								
Noemi Zbären	100 metres hurdles								
Fabienne Schlumpf	3000 metres steeplechase								
Michelle Cueni; Fanette Humair; Aurelie Humair; Mujinga Kambundji; Marisa Lavanchy; Léa Sprunger	4 × 100 metres relay								
Patricia Morceli Buhler	Marathon								
Renate Wyss	Marathon								
Laura Polli	20 kilometres walk								
Marie Polli	20 kilometres walk								

Field events

Athlete	Event	Preliminaries		Final	
Athlete	Event	Width Height	Rank	Width Height	Rank
Nicole Buchler	Pole vault				

Heptathlon

Ellen Sprunger	Heptathlon			
Ellen Sprunger	Event	Results	Points	Rank
	100 m hurdles			
	High jump			
	Shot put			
	200 m			
	Long jump			
	Javelin throw			
	800 m			
Total				

Linda Zublin	Heptathlon			
Linda Zublin	Event	Results	Points	Rank
	100 m hurdles			
	High jump			
	Shot put			
	200 m			
	Long jump			
	Javelin throw			
	800 m			
Total				
