= Norway at the 2013 World Championships in Athletics =

- WA code: NOR

in Moscow
- Competitors: 11
- Medals: Gold 0 Silver 0 Bronze 0 Total 0

World Championships in Athletics appearances (overview)
- 1980; 1983; 1987; 1991; 1993; 1995; 1997; 1999; 2001; 2003; 2005; 2007; 2009; 2011; 2013; 2015; 2017; 2019; 2022; 2023

Norway is competing at the 2013 World Championships in Athletics in Moscow, Russia, from 10–18 August 2013. A team of 11 athletes was announced to represent the country in the event.

== Results ==
(q – qualified, NM – no mark, SB – season best)

=== Men ===
Track and road events

Athlete	Event	Preliminaries		Heats		Semifinals		Final	
Athlete	Event	Time	Rank	Time	Rank	Time	Rank	Time	Rank
Jaysuma Saidy Ndure	100 metres								
Jaysuma Saidy Ndure	200 metres								
Henrik Ingebrigtsen	1500 metres								
Erik Tysse	20 kilometres walk								
Erik Tysse	50 kilometres walk								
Håvard Haukenes	50 kilometres walk								

Field events

Athlete	Event	Preliminaries		Final	
Athlete	Event	Width Height	Rank	Width Height	Rank
Andreas Thorkildsen	Javelin throw				

=== Women ===
Track and road events

Athlete	Event	Preliminaries		Heats		Semifinals		Final	
Athlete	Event	Time	Rank	Time	Rank	Time	Rank	Time	Rank
Ezinne Okparaebo	100 metres								
Karoline Bjerkeli Grovdal	5000 metres								
Isabelle Pedersen	100 metres hurdles								

Field events

Athlete	Event	Preliminaries		Final	
Athlete	Event	Width Height	Rank	Width Height	Rank
Tonje Angelsen	High jump				

Heptathlon

Ida Marcussen	Heptathlon			
Ida Marcussen	Event	Results	Points	Rank
	100 m hurdles			
	High jump			
	Shot put			
	200 m			
	Long jump			
	Javelin throw			
	800 m			
Total				
