= Belarus at the 2013 World Championships in Athletics =

- WA code: BLR

in Moscow
- Competitors: 27
- Medals: Gold 0 Silver 0 Bronze 0 Total 0

World Championships in Athletics appearances
- 1993; 1995; 1997; 1999; 2001; 2003; 2005; 2007; 2009; 2011; 2013; 2015; 2017; 2019; 2022; 2023

Belarus was competing at the 2013 World Championships in Athletics in Moscow, Russia, from 10 to 18 August 2013. A team of 27 athletes were announced to represent the country in the event.

== Results ==
(q – qualified, NM – no mark, SB – season best)

=== Men ===
Track and road events

Athlete	Event	Preliminaries		Heats		Semifinals		Final	
Athlete	Event	Time	Rank	Time	Rank	Time	Rank	Time	Rank
Anis Ananenka	800 metres			1:47.76	27	did not advance			
Dzianis Simanovich	20 kilometres walk							1:31:52	48
Ivan Trotski	50 kilometres walk							3:47:52 SB	14

Field events

Athlete	Event	Preliminaries		Final	
Athlete	Event	Width Height	Rank	Width Height	Rank
Pavel Lyzhyn	Shot put	NM		did not advance	
Uladzimir Kazlou	Javelin throw	72.66	32	did not advance	
Pavel Kryvitski	Hammer throw	74.45	14	did not advance	
Yury Shayunou	Hammer throw	75.18	12 q	73.68	12
Valery Sviatokha	Hammer throw	72.05	21	did not advance	

Decathlon

Andrei Krauchanka	Decathlon			
Andrei Krauchanka	Event	Results	Points	Rank
	100 m	11.19	819	23
	Long jump	7.39	908	14
	Shot put	14.84	780	4
	High jump	2.11 SB	906	2
	400 m	48.80	871	14
	110 m hurdles	14.44	918	12
	Discus throw	46.12	790	6
	Pole vault	5.10 SB	941	=6
	Javelin throw	59.98	738	16
	1500 m	4:39.63	683	12
Total			8314	12

Eduard Mikhan	Decathlon			
Eduard Mikhan	Event	Results	Points	Rank
	100 m	10.97	867	13
	Long jump	7.42	915	12
	Shot put	14.15	738	16
	High jump	1.96	767	19
	400 m	48.80 SB	871	14
	110 m hurdles	14.82	871	19
	Discus throw	48.00	829	2
	Pole vault	4.60	790	20
	Javelin throw	50.74	600	26
	1500 m	4:33.71	720	13
Total			7968	18

=== Women ===
Track and road events

Athlete	Event	Preliminaries		Heats		Semifinals		Final	
Athlete	Event	Time	Rank	Time	Rank	Time	Rank	Time	Rank
Katsiaryna Hanchar	100 metres			11.63	33	did not advance			
Marina Arzamasova	800 metres			1:59.60 SB	7 q	2:01.19	13	did not advance	
Alina Talay	100 metres hurdles			12.99	10 Q				
Iryna Khliustava; Hanna Reishal; Ilona Usovich; Yuliya Yurenia	4 × 400 metres relay			3:30.28 SB	10			did not advance	
Hanna Drabenia	20 kilometres walk							1:31:16	16
Nastassia Yatsevich	20 kilometres walk							1:32:31 SB	24

Field events

Athlete	Event	Preliminaries		Final	
Athlete	Event	Width Height	Rank	Width Height	Rank
Volha Sudarava	Long jump	6.71	4 q	6.82 SB	4
Natallia Viatkina	Triple jump	13.19	21	did not advance	
Aliona Dubitskaya	Shot put	16.53	27	did not advance	
Alena Kopets	Shot put	17.87	12 q	17.70	12
Yuliya Leantsiuk	Shot put	17.73	16	did not advance	
Aksana Miankova	Hammer throw	66.65	22	did not advance	

Heptathlon

Yana Maksimava	Heptathlon			
Yana Maksimava	Event	Results	Points	Rank
	100 m hurdles	14.11	963	27
	High jump	1.74	903	20
	Shot put	14.27	812	3
	200 m	25.77	817	30
	Long jump	5.77	780	27
	Javelin throw	45.41 PB	771	12
	800 m	2:11.96 SB	936	9
Total			5982	20

Katsiaryna Netsviatayeva	Heptathlon			
Katsiaryna Netsviatayeva	Event	Results	Points	Rank
	100 m hurdles	13.87	997	17
	High jump	1.74 SB	903	24
	Shot put	14.17	805	5
	200 m	25.09	879	21
	Long jump	5.67	750	29
	Javelin throw	38.60	640	26
	800 m	2:12.54	928	9
Total			5902	22
