= Annabelle Lewis =

British sprinter (born 1989)

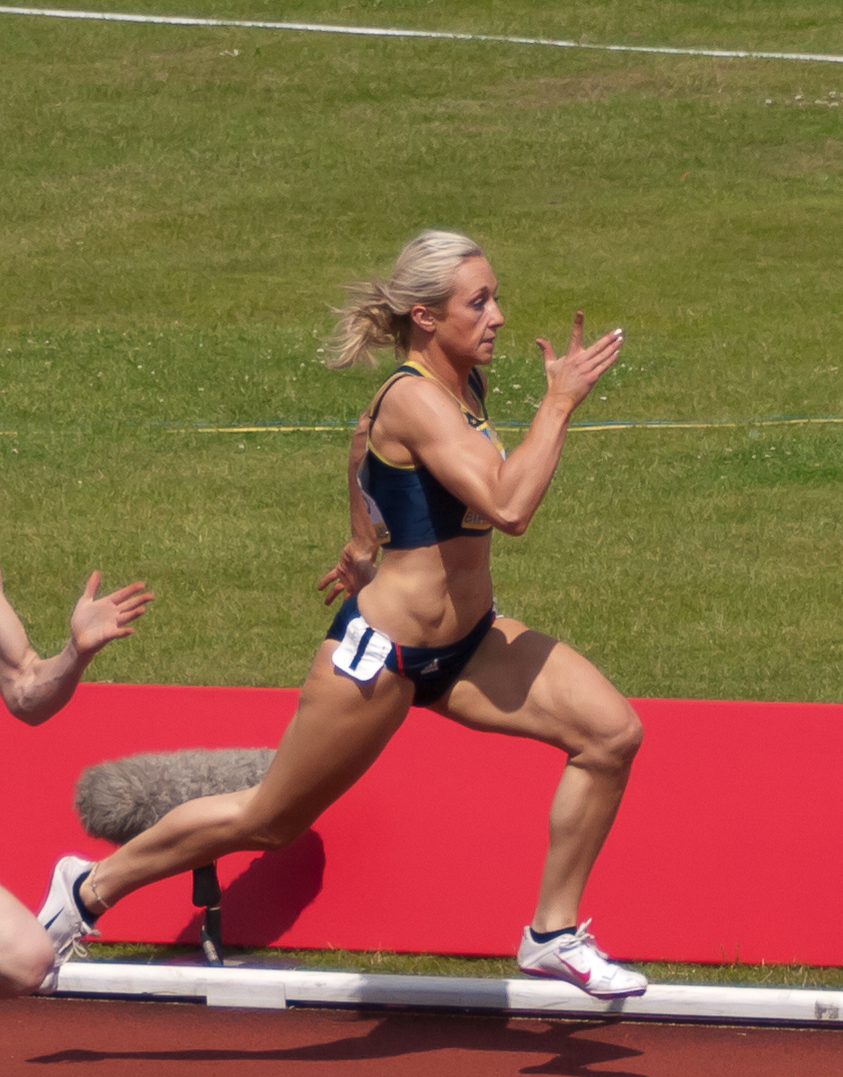
- Annabelle Lewis in 2010

Medal record

Representing Great Britain

Women's athletics

World Championships
Bronze medal – third place	2013 Moscow	4x100 m relay

Annabelle Lewis (born 20 March 1989) is a British track and field sprinter. After rising through the British rankings, she won a bronze medal at the 2013 World Championships in Moscow, as a member of the Great Britain 4 x 100 metres relay squad.

== Career ==
Lewis is a member of Kingston upon Hull A.C. (KUHAC) and is coached by Rana Reider. She was previously coached by Roger Walters, who died in 2013. In 2012, Lewis improved her three-year-old 100 metres PB from 11.73 to 11.51, to rank in the UK top ten for the first time.

Lewis's breakthrough year was 2013. During the indoor season, she improved her 60 metres best to 7.31 secs in January, before running 7.32 to finish second at the British Indoor Championships in February. She ended the indoor season ranked third in the UK. Outdoors, she improved her 100 metres best from 11.51 to 11.36, in the heats of the British Championships. She went on to finish second in the final in 11.43. These performances earned her relay selection for the World Championships.

At the 2013 World Championships in Moscow, the British 4 × 100 m relay quartet of Dina Asher-Smith, Ashleigh Nelson, Lewis and Hayley Jones, ran 42.75 to reach the final. In the final, they ran 42.87 to originally finish fourth, but were promoted to the bronze medal after the disqualification of the French squad.

After being injured during the 2014 indoor season, she returned to action for the first time in over 11 months on 17 Jan 2015. She won the Northern Athletics Indoor Senior Championships 60 m with a time of 7.39.

== Personal bests ==
Event	Time	UK ranking
60m	7.31 secs	3rd in 2013
100m	11.36 secs	5th in 2013
200m	23.90 secs	20th in 2012
400m	58.1 secs	30th in 2006 (U20)
