= Tori Polk =

American long jumper

Personal information
- Born: 21 September 1983 (age 42) Hewitt, Texas, United States

Sport
- Sport: Track and field
- Club: Texas Tech Red Raiders

Tori Polk (born September 21, 1983) is an American track and field athlete who competes in the long jump. She has a personal record of 6.75 m (22 ft 1 1/2 in) for the event.

She represented the United States at the World Championships in Athletics in both 2011 and 2013. She also placed seventh at the 2011 Pan American Games. Polk won her first national title at the age of 30, taking gold at the 2014 USA Indoor Track and Field Championships. She competed collegiately for the Texas Tech Red Raiders and broke school records in the long jump and the 4×400-meter relay.

== Career ==
=== Early life and career ===
Polk was born to Carl and Dianna Polk, the youngest of the family's six children. She grew up in Hewitt, Texas, and attended Midway High School. It was there that she began taking part in track and field and she was a two-time runner-up at the state high school championships. She went on enrol at Texas Tech University in 2002 and competed collegiately for the Texas Tech Red Raiders.

Initially she ran the 400-meter dash for the school but began to do the long jump from 2004. That year she gained her first All-America honors by reaching the NCAA Women's Indoor Track and Field Championship with a school record of 3:33.85 for the relay. The team repeated this feat outdoors, improving to 3:29.49 minutes. In 2005, she broke the long jump school record with a jump of 6.08 m (19 ft 11 1/4 in) to take fourth at the Big 12 Conference indoor championship. In her best ever performance at the NCAA Women's Outdoor Track and Field Championship she jumped 6.26 m (20 ft 6 1/4 in) to take sixth place – two weeks before she had broken the school record with a personal best of 6.29 m (20 ft 7 1/2 in). Her last collegiate season was the 2006 indoors and it was also her best as she jumped 6.47 m (21 ft 2 1/2 in) and was twelfth at the NCAA indoors.

=== Professional career ===
Polk's first professional season in 2008 saw her place sixth at the USA Indoor Track and Field Championships long jump, but she did not make the final of the USA Outdoor Track and Field Championships. She also had a personal record jump of 6.54 m (21 ft 5 1/4 in) in Fayetteville, Arkansas. She competed sparingly in 2009 but still ranked within the top ten nationally after improving to 6.58 m (21 ft 7 in). Polk competed on the IAAF World Challenge circuit in 2010, travelling abroad to compete for the first time. She came sixth at both the Colorful Daegu Meeting and the Meeting Grand Prix IAAF de Dakar. Her season's best of 6.56 m (21 ft 6 1/4 in) that year ranked her 14th in the United States.

She made her breakthrough at international level at the age of 27. A jump of 6.75 m (22 ft 1 1/2 in) in Clermont, Florida moved her up to sixth in the national yearly lists and she placed fourth at the 2011 USA Outdoor Track and Field Championships. As the winner of that event was Brittney Reese (the reigning world champion), Polk was granted the additional fourth spot on the American team for the 2011 World Championships in Athletics. In her international debut she only managed 5.66 m (18 ft 6 3/4 in) and placed second to last in the qualifying round. She made her second appearance for the United States shortly after, finishing seventh at the 2011 Pan American Games. The following season did not bring as much opportunity: she had her best performance of 6.54 m (21 ft 5 1/4 in) at the 2012 United States Olympic Trials., but this was only enough for ninth place so she did not compete at the 2012 London Olympics.

Her career reached new heights in 2013. She cleared the 6.70 m (21 ft 11 3/4 in) mark four times, including twice at the 2013 World Championships in Athletics, which helped her to eighth place on the world stage. A wind-assisted 6.80 m (22 ft 3 1/2 in) brought her to second place 2013 USA Outdoor Track and Field Championships. On the meet circuit, she competed frequently on the 2013 IAAF Diamond League tour (including fourth place in London and New York), as well as breaking the meet record at the IAAF World Challenge Beijing. At the beginning of 2014 she won her first national title at the USA Indoor Championships, leaping an indoor best of 6.70 m (21 ft 11 3/4 in).

She received a two year ban from the sport for a doping infraction. She was caught for possession of a banned peptide in May 2015 and her two year ban carried from April 2016 to 2018.

== Personal records ==
- Long jump outdoor – 6.75 m (22 ft 1 1/2 in) (2011 & 2013)
- Long jump indoor – 6.70 m (21 ft 11 3/4 in) (2014)
- 60-meter dash – 7.66 (2014)
- 200-meter dash – 24.19 (2005)
- 400-meter dash – 55.13 (2004)
