= Peace Uko =

Nigerian sprinter (born 1995)

Personal information
- Born: 26 November 1995 (age 30) Abeokuta, Nigeria

Sport
- Country: Nigeria
- Sport: Athletics
- Sprint: 100 m

Achievements and titles
- Personal best: 100 m: 11.27 s (2015)
- Updated on 2 August 2016

Peace Uko (born 26 December 1995) is a Nigerian track and field sprinter who specialises in the 100 metres. She won the 100 m at the 18th Nigerian National Sports Festival.

She ran the first leg in the heats of the 4 × 100 m at the 2013 Moscow World Championships. The team was eventually disqualified for a baton drop between team mates, Patience Okon George and Stephanie Kalu.

At her first outing at the Nigerian University Games in 2014, she won the 100 m. She also won the 200 m finishing ahead of Patience Okon George. This helped her university, University of Port Harcourt win the games for the fifth consecutive time.

At the 2015 World Relays in Nassau, she ran the anchor leg in the 4 × 100 m for Nigeria who finished in seventh place. in 2015, she also set a personal best of 11.27 s at the NTC Pure Athletics Sprints Elite Meet in Clermont, Florida, United States. At the 2016 Nigerian Championships, she placed second in the 100 m behind Blessing Okagbare-Ighoteguonor, also finishing ahead of the defending champion, Gloria Asumnu. Uko competed at the Rio 2016 Summer Olympics in the 100 m and 4 x 100 m.
