= George Kitchens =

American long jumper

Personal information
- Born: January 30, 1983 (age 43)
- Height: 1.78 m (5 ft 10 in)
- Weight: 73 kg (161 lb)

Sport
- Country: United States
- Sport: Track and field
- Event: Long jump
- Coached by: Kareem Streete-Thompson
- Retired: 2015

Achievements and titles
- Personal best: Long jump: 8.21 m (2012)
- Updated on 6 April 2021

George Kitchens (born January 30, 1983) is an American track and field athlete who competes in the long jump. He has a personal record of 8.23 meters (27 ft 0 in) for the event and was a member of the United States 2012 Olympics team. He was the American national champion in 2013 and represented his country at the 2013 World Championships in Athletics.

== Career ==
Kitchens was raised in Hephzibah, Georgia. While attending Glenn Hills High School in Augusta, Georgia, he won the long jump at the 2001 national high school championships. He went on to study at Clemson University and competed for the Clemson Tigers track team. In his second year at the institution he earned All-America honours at the NCAA Outdoor Championships, was the NCAA East Regional champion, and competed at the 2003 USA Outdoor Track and Field Championships. He cleared a personal record of 7.89 meters at the Georgia Tech Invitational meet in June 2003. Kitchens earned NCAA Outdoor and Indoor All-America honours in his final year, and also managed to finish runner-up at the NCAA East Regionals after winning the Atlantic Coast Conference outdoor long jump title.

Kitchens ranked top ten in the long jump at both the American indoor and outdoor championships in his first year as a professional in 2006. He competed sparingly in the 2007 and 2008 seasons. He re-emerged in 2009 with a fourth-place finish at the USA Indoor Track and Field Championships, followed by a podium finish at the USA Outdoors, taking third with a mark of 8.23 m. Typically this would have gained him a spot for the World Championships squad, but because the mark was wind-aided and he did not possess the "A" qualifying standard, he did not get called up. He began to compete in Europe for the first time that year and set a new best of 7.98 m at a meeting in Salamanca, Spain. He failed to build on this in 2010 and he finished out of the top ten at the USA Outdoors with his season's best mark of 7.64 m.

He started the 2012 season strongly at the Georgia Relays, winning with a wind-assisted jump of 8.27 m and setting a wind-legal personal record of 8.14 m. He placed third at the Colorful Daegu Meeting and the Adidas Grand Prix meet in New York City. He earned his first ever national selection at the 2012 United States Olympic Trials, where his personal best clearance of 8.21 m was enough for third place in the long jump. He failed to match this form at the 2012 Summer Olympics, clearing only 6.84 m in the qualifying round to finish 39th overall.

The following year he won his first and only national title at the 2013 USA Outdoor Track and Field Championships, recording a wind-assisted mark of 8.23 m. He set his season's best two weeks later in Chula Vista with a winning jump of 8.17 m. He again failed to take his form into international competition and was eliminated in the qualifying at the 2013 World Championships in Athletics with a jump of 7.75 m. After making a limited number of appearances in 2014 and 2015, he retired from competitive athletics.

Following his retirement Kitchens was arrested for aggravated assault and gun threats against his mother and sister in June 2016, after making demands for money. Kitchens had suffered violence as a child including being shot in the chest and arm at the age of 12 in an attack in which his sister was also paralyzed.

== International competitions ==
Representing the United States
Year	Competition	Venue	Position	Event	Result	Notes
2012	Olympic Games	London, United Kingdom	39th (q)	Long jump	6.84 m	
2013	World Championships	Moscow, Russia	20th (q)	Long jump	7.75 m	

== National titles ==
- USA Outdoor Track and Field Championships
  - Long jump: 2013
