= Carrie Russell =

Jamaican sprinter and bobsledder

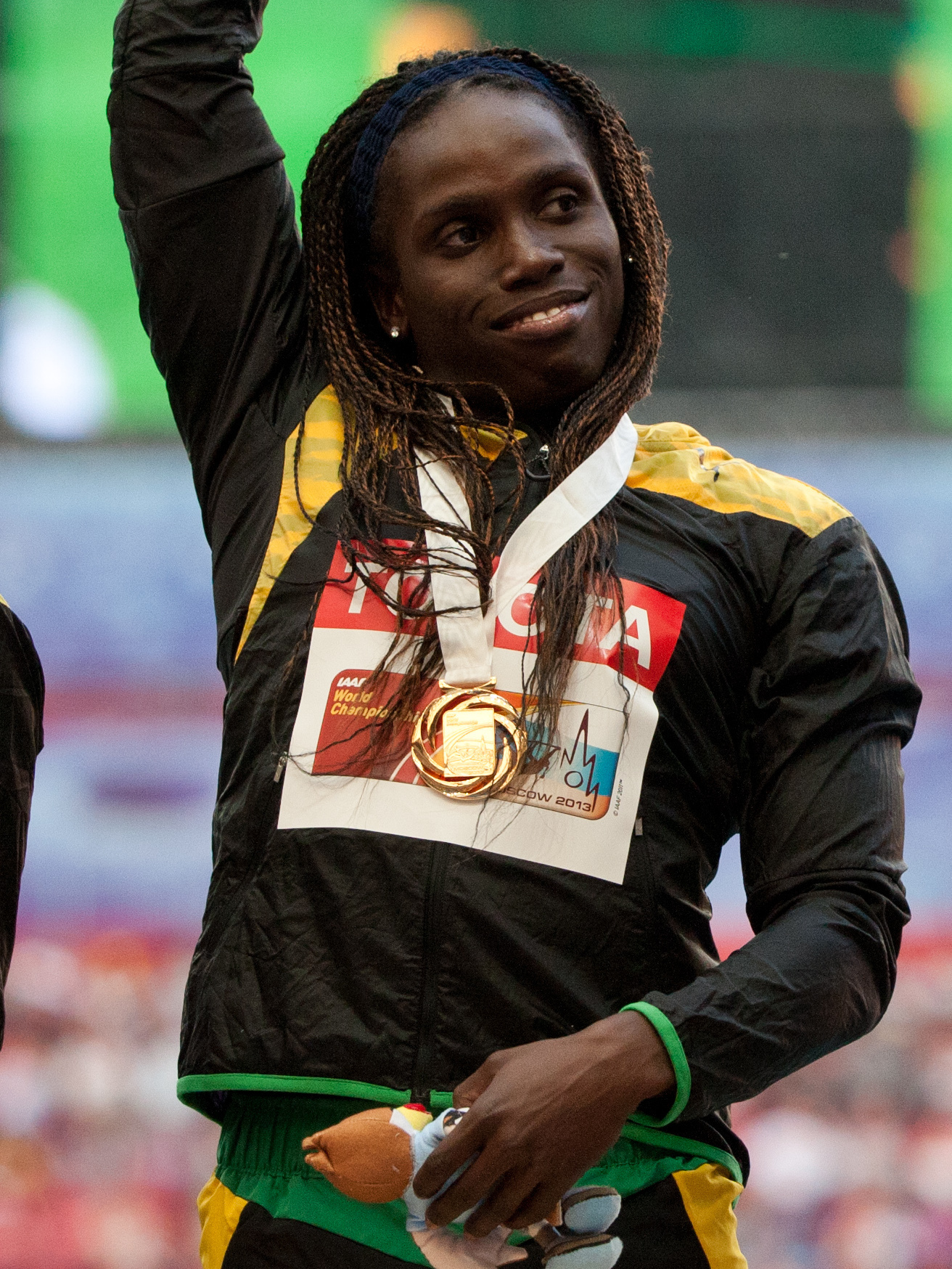
- 2013

Personal information
- Nationality: Jamaican
- Born: 18 October 1990 (age 36)

Sport
- Sport: Track and field Bobsleigh
- Event: 100 m
Medal record
Women's athletics
Representing Jamaica
World Championships
Gold medal – first place	2013 Moscow	4 × 100 m relay
Summer Universiade
Gold medal – first place	2011 Shenzhen	100 m
World Relay Championships
Silver medal – second place	2014 Nassau	4 × 100 m relay

Carrie Russell (born 18 October 1990) is a Jamaican track and field sprinter and bobsledder. She competed in the 4 × 100 metres relay event at the 2013 World Championships in Athletics, winning a gold medal. She is from the parish of St. Thomas, where she attended the St. Thomas Technical High School. Russell won the bronze medal in the 4 × 100 m relay at the 2006 World Junior Championships in Athletics.

In addition to her athletics career, Russell has competed as a bobsleigh brakeman for Jamaica since the 2016–17 season. In January 2018 she was part of the Jamaican bobsleigh crew that secured qualification for the 2018 Winter Olympics in Pyongchang, South Korea, the first time that a Jamaican women's team competed at the Winter Olympics.
