= Mookie Salaam =

American sprinter (born 1990)

Personal information
- Nationality: United States
- Born: April 5, 1990 (age 36) San Bernardino, California
- Height: 5 ft 11 in (1.80 m)
- Weight: 175 lb (79 kg)

Sport
- Sport: Running
- Event: Sprints
- College team: Oklahoma Sooners
- Club: Adidas

Achievements and titles
- Personal best(s): 100 m: 9.97 (2011 Des Moines); 200 m: 20.05 (Norman 2011); 60 m: 6.54 (Fayetteville 2011)
Medal record
Men's athletics
Representing the United States
World Championships
| Silver medal – second place | 2013 Moscow | 4×100 m relay |

Rakieem "Mookie" Mustafa Allah Salaam (born April 5, 1990) is an American sprinter. Grew up in San Bernardino, California, Mookie started running track in the sixth grade, but was forced to quit by his stepfather. Salaam became a three-sport athlete at Edmond North High School in Edmond, Oklahoma. He played wide receiver on the football varsity, but decided to focus on track after suffering a dislocated hip in his junior year.

He turned down football scholarships to run track at the University of Oklahoma. It was not until Salaam's junior year at the university that he made a name for himself nationality. On June 10, 2011, Salaam became the 79th person to break the 10-second barrier when he ran the 100m in 9.97s at the NCAA Track and Field Championships, placing second. He also won the NCAA Indoor 200m that year, with a time of 20.41. Several of his times are school records. He decided to forgo his senior year and sign a professional contract with Adidas, to better prepare for the 2012 United States Olympic Trials. In 2013, Salaam was part of the USA 4 × 100 m team that placed second at the World Championships in Moscow Russia.

In 2023, Salaam became the head coach of the Niagara Purple Eagles track and field team.
