= Jack Whitt =

American pole vaulter (born 1990)

Jack Bryan Whitt
Personal information
- Born: April 12, 1990 (age 36) Norman, Oklahoma
- Height: 6 ft 4 in (1.93 m)
- Weight: 190 lb (86 kg)

Sport
- Country: United States
- Event: Pole vault
- Club: Nike/Dial Athletic's/UCS Spirit
- Turned pro: June 2013
- Now coaching: Joe Dial

Achievements and titles
- Highest world ranking: Ranked #1 2009 High School and #2 2009 Junior 19 and under in the World 2012 #1 NCAA College National Champion
- Personal bests: Outdoor: 5.70 m Indoor: 5.72 m
Medal record
Men's athletics
Representing the United States
Pan American Junior Championships
Gold medal – first place	2009 Port-of-Spain	Pole vault

Jack Bryan Whitt (born April 12, 1990) is an American pole vaulter. His personal best jump indoors is 5.72 m (18 ft 9 in), achieved in June 2012 in Tulsa, OK. His best outdoor jump of 5.70 m (18 ft 8 1/4 in) came in May 2013 in Tulsa, Oklahoma. He represented the United States at the 2013 World Championships in Athletics in Moscow.

== High school career ==
Whitt went to high school at Norman North High School in Norman, Oklahoma. He was coached by Tim McMichael of McMichael Athletics of Oklahoma City. In 2007, he cleared 4.87 m (15 ft 11 1/2 in) and was a runner up at the 2007 AAU nationals in Knoxville Tennessee vaulting 4.88 m (16 ft 0 in). In 2008, he cleared 5.25 m (17 ft 2 1/2 in) and also won the 2008 Junior Olympics in Omaha, Nebraska with a jump of 5.10 m (16 ft 8 3/4 in). While a senior in high school, he cleared 5.49 m (18 ft 0 in).

Whitt won the 2009 USATF Junior National championships in pole vault with a jump of 5.25 m (17 ft 2 1/2 in), qualifying him for the 2009 Pan American Junior Athletics Championships held in Trinidad and Tobago. He won the gold medal with a vault of 5.20 m (17 ft 1/2 in) at the 2009 Pan American Junior Athletics Championships. At the age of 18, Whitt vaulted 18 feet, making him the sixth high schooler to ever do so.

Whitt attended Oral Roberts University in Tulsa, Oklahoma and was coached by Joe Dial, the No. 1 U.S. vaulter in 1985 and nationally ranked for 10 years. He is a three-time Oklahoma state champion and holds the record at the Golden South Meet of 17 ft 10 in, the Texas Relay's 18 ft 1/4 in, and the New Balance outdoor (Nike) 17 ft 8 1/4.

== College career ==
- 2010 Indoor All-American as a freshman at Oral Roberts University. Finished sixth at the championships vaulting 5.35 m (17 ft 6 1/2 in).
- 2010 Jack also was selected to Team USA for the NACAC games in Miami.
- 2010 Jack qualified for the US National Championships. He finished fifth at the age of 20.
- 2011 Jack won the elite division of the Reno Pole Vault Summit jumping 5.50 m (18 ft 1/2 in) becoming the youngest to do so at age 20
- 2011 Jack placed third at the NCAA Indoor National meet with a vault of 5.45 m (17 ft 10 1/2 in) becoming an Indoor All-American
- 2011 Jack won the Texas Relays with a jump of 5.60 m (18 ft 4 1/4 in). It was Jack's third Texas Relays win. He won two in high school.
- 2011 Jack placed second at the NCAA National outdoor meet with a jump of 5.35 m (17 ft 6 1/2 in) to become an All-American.
- 2011 Jack placed 6th at the US nationals jumping 5.45 m (17 ft 10 1/2 in)
- 2011 Jack finished with a number 7 US ranking and a number 27 ranking in the world at 21 years of age.
- 2012 Jack finished 3rd at the NCAA indoor championships with a vault of 5.50 m (18 ft 1/2 in)
- 2012 Jack wins his 2nd Texas Relay Championship his 4th overall with a vault of 5.50 m (18 ft 1/2 in)
- 2012 Jack finished 1st at the 2012 outdoor NCAA National Championships with a vault of 5.65 m (18 ft 6 1/4 in)
- 2012 Jack made the final at the Olympic trials in Eugene, Oregon and finished as the alternate for the games.
- 2012 Jack finishes with a number 6 ranking in the US
- 2013 Jack won the Southland Conference indoor championship vaulting 5.62 m (18 ft 5 1/4 in) setting the meet record.
- 2013 Jack finished 2nd at the NCAA Indoor Nationals vaulting 5.60 m (18 ft 4 1/4 in).
- 2013 Jack finished 1st at the Southland Conference outdoor championship vaulting 5.55 m (18 ft 2 1/2 in) setting the meet record
- 2013 Jack finished 2nd at the Outdoor National Championships vaulting 5.65 m (18 ft 6 1/4 in)
- Jack was a seven-time All-American while at Oral Roberts University.

== Pro career ==
- 2013 Jack turned pro and signed with Jeff Hartwig as his agent and with Nike, UCS Spirit, Dial Athletic's, C.B Athletic's and P.W. Enterprises as his major sponsors.
- 2013 Jack vaulted 5.60 m (18 ft 4 1/4 in) and made the 2013 World Team going to Moscow where he finished 3rd.
- 2013 Jack won his first pro meet in Belgium vaulting 5.63 m (18 ft 5 1/2 in) to set a new meet and stadium record.
- 2013 Jack finished with a #3 ranking in the US and 25th in the world.

== Personal ==
Whitt was born in Norman, Oklahoma in 1990, the son of Kevin and Ki Whitt. At his father's urging, Whitt started pole vaulting in the seventh grade. "My dad talked me into vaulting in the seventh grade. I was tall for my age and he thought a non-team sport would be better for me," said Whitt. "I did play football, basketball and baseball until the tenth grade. I was actually a pretty good pitcher." Whitt married Reagan Russell in July 2012.
