= English Gardner =

American sprinter (born 1992)

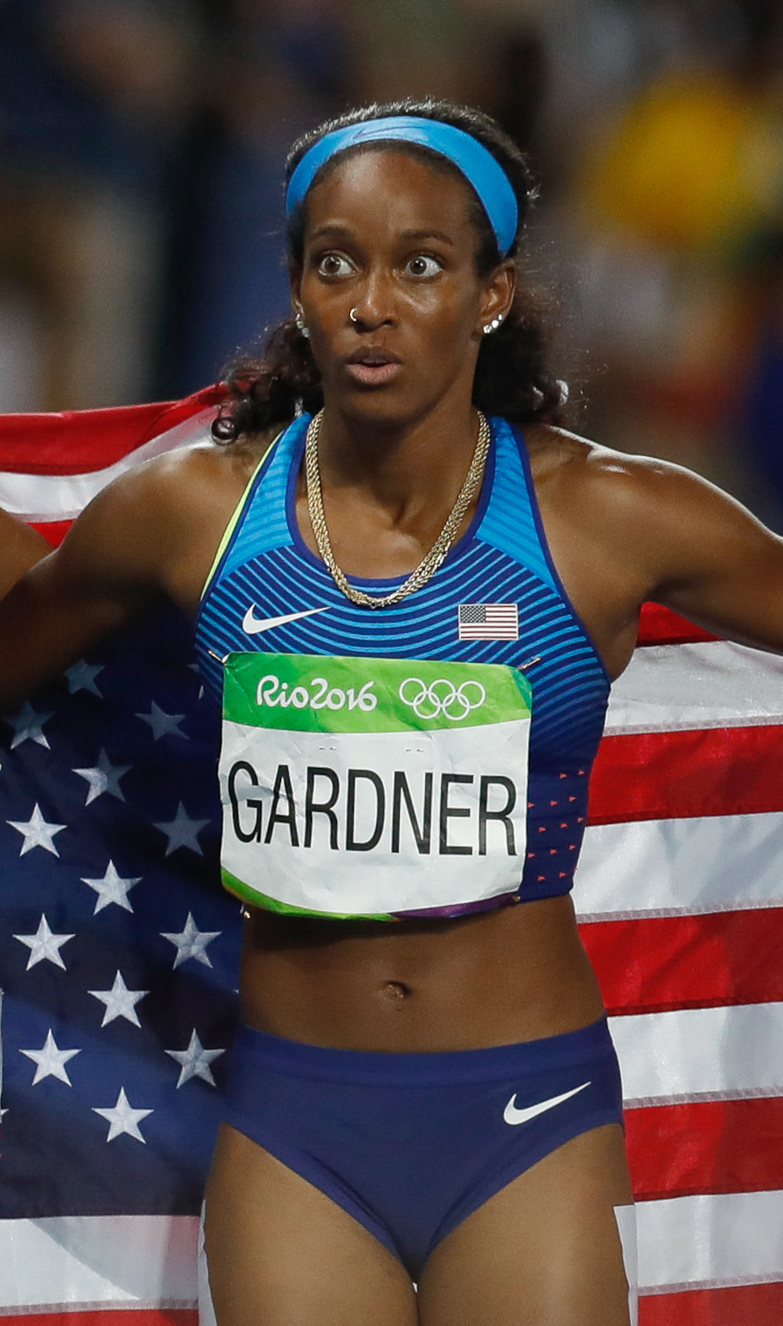
- Gardner at the 2016 Summer Olympics

Personal information
- Born: April 22, 1992 (age 34) Philadelphia, Pennsylvania, U.S.
- Height: 5 ft 6 in (168 cm)
- Weight: 119 lb (54 kg)

Sport
- Sport: Running
- Events: 100 meters, 200 meters

Achievements and titles
- Personal bests: 100 m: 10.74 s (2016); 200 m: 22.62 s (2013)
Medal record
Women's athletics
Representing the United States
Olympic Games
Gold medal – first place	2016 Rio de Janeiro	4 × 100 m relay
Silver medal – second place	2020 Tokyo	4 × 100 m relay
World Championships
Silver medal – second place	2013 Moscow	4 × 100 m relay
Silver medal – second place	2015 Beijing	4 × 100 m relay

English Gardner (born April 22, 1992) is an American track and field sprinter who specializes in the 100-meter dash. She has a personal best of 10.74 seconds, set in 2016.

== Career ==
She was born in Philadelphia and grew up in Voorhees Township, New Jersey, where she graduated from Eastern Regional High School as part of the class of 2010. While running for the University of Oregon, in 2011 she set what should have been the American junior record in the 100 meters at 11.03 (+0.6) set while winning the Pac-10 Championships. Her mark is superior to the listed record formerly held by Angela Williams from 1999, but that mark had not yet been ratified. The current record of 10.98 (+2.0) is now held by, Candace Hill. She was a five-time NCAA champion with the Oregon Ducks track and field team, winning two 100 m titles, two 4×400 m titles, and an indoor 60 m dash title.

Gardner qualified for the 2013 World Championships in Athletics in Moscow after winning the 100 m at the 2013 USA Outdoor Track and Field Championships. Her time of 10.85 equalled the best time run in 2013 to that date by Barbara Pierre set earlier that same day in a semi-final. In Moscow, Gardner just missed the podium with a fourth-place finish in the 100 meters with a time of 10.97. She was a silver medalist with the United States in the 4 × 100-meter relay.

Gardner qualified for the 2015 World Championships in Athletics in Beijing after a runner up 100 m at the 2015 USA Outdoor Track and Field Championships.

Gardner won the 100 meters at the 2016 United States Olympic Trials in a time of 10.74 (+1.0). In addition to qualifying her for the 2016 Summer Olympics, the time tied Merlene Ottey as the seventh fastest competitor in history.

Gardner finished 7th in the 100 meters at the 2016 Summer Olympics, running 10.94, and won gold in the 4 × 100 meters relay, running a combined 41.01.

In 2025, Gardner became one of the hosts of The Athlete's Lounge on FloTrack with Matthew Centrowitz and Trey Hardee, providing live commentary for the 2025 Diamond League season.

== Coaching in NCAA ==
Coach Gardner joined the Princeton University men's track & field coaching staff as a volunteer assistant in November 2018.

In February 2019, Princeton men won Ivy League team championship in Boston. In May 2019, Princeton men won Ivy League team championship in Princeton, New Jersey.

In March 2020, Princeton men won Ivy League team championship in Ithaca, New York. In October 2021, Princeton men won Ivy League team championship in Princeton, New Jersey.

In February 2022, Princeton men won Ivy League team championship in Fort Washington Avenue Armory in New York City. In March 2022, Princeton men placed 5th 2022 NCAA Division I Indoor Track and Field Championships in Birmingham CrossPlex. In May 2022, Princeton men won Ivy League team championship at Yale University. In June 2022, Princeton men placed 7th 2022 NCAA Division I Outdoor Track and Field Championships in Hayward Field in Eugene, Oregon.

== Personal records ==
- 100-meter dash – 10.74 (2016)
- 200-meter dash – 22.62 (2013)
- 400-meter dash – 53.98 (2006)
- 60-meter dash indoor – 7.12 (2012)
- 200-meter dash indoor – 23.34 (2012)

== National titles ==
- USA Outdoor Track and Field Championships
  - 100-meter dash: 2013, 2016
- NCAA Women's Division I Outdoor Track and Field Championships
  - 100-meter dash: 2012, 2013
- NCAA Women's Division I Indoor Track and Field Championships
  - 60-meter dash: 2012

== International competitions ==
Year	Competition	Venue	Position	Event	Notes
2013	World Championships	Moscow, Russia	4th	100 m	10.97
2013	World Championships	Moscow, Russia	2nd	4 × 100 m relay	42.75
2015	World Championships	Beijing, China	14th (sf)	100 m	11.13
2015	World Championships	Beijing, China	2nd	4 × 100 m relay	41.68
2016	Olympic Games	Rio de Janeiro, Brazil	7th	100 m	10.94
2016	Olympic Games	Rio de Janeiro, Brazil	1st	4 × 100 m relay	41.01
2019	World Championships	Doha, Qatar	23rd	100 m	11.20 in prelim
2021	Olympic Games	Tokyo, Japan	2nd	4 × 100 m relay	41.90
