= Sheri-Ann Brooks =

Jamaican sprinter (born 1983)

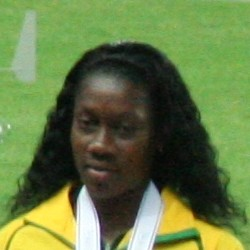

Personal information
- Born: 11 February 1983 (age 43) Manchester, Jamaica

Sport
- Sport: Track and field
Medal record
Representing Jamaica
Women's athletics
World Championships
Gold medal – first place	2013 Moscow	4 × 100 m relay
Silver medal – second place	2007 Osaka	4 × 100 m relay
Commonwealth Games
Gold medal – first place	2006 Melbourne	100 m
Gold medal – first place	2006 Melbourne	4 × 100 m relay
Pan American Games
Gold medal – first place	2007 Rio de Janeiro	4 × 100 m relay
Silver medal – second place	2007 Rio de Janeiro	200 m

Sheri-Ann Brooks (born 11 February 1983 in Kingston) is a Jamaican sprinter, who specializes in the 100 metres.

Brooks was born in Manchester and attended Manchester High School. She is the first child of Mr. Errol Brooks and Mrs. Donna Brooks.

Brooks represented the Jamaica at the 2008 Summer Olympics in Beijing. She competed at the 4 × 100 metres relay together with Shelly-Ann Fraser, Aleen Bailey and Veronica Campbell-Brown. In its first round heat, Jamaica placed first in front of Russia, Germany and China. The Jamaica relay's time of 42.24 seconds was the first time overall out of sixteen participating nations. With this result, Jamaica qualified for the final, replacing Brooks and Bailey with Sherone Simpson and Kerron Stewart. Jamaica did not finish the race due to a mistake in the baton exchange.

She qualified for the 100 m at the 2009 World Championships in Athletics with a third-place finish at the Jamaican national championships, behind Fraser and Stewart.

In June 2009, Brooks was one of five members of the Jamaica national team who were reported for providing urine samples that tested positive for a banned stimulant. Brooks was cleared to continue racing on a technicality, however, as the Jamaican Anti-Doping Commission had tested her B-sample without her prior knowledge. Nevertheless, the Jamaica Amateur Athletic Association withdrew her from the relay race at the World Championships as a precaution.

Representing the FIU Panthers track and field team, Brooks won the 200 m at the 2005 NCAA Division I Outdoor Track and Field Championships.

== Achievements ==
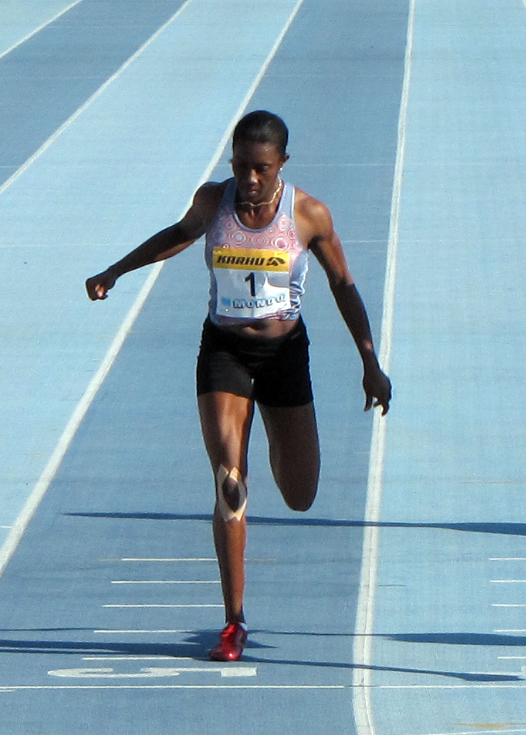
Brooks competing at the Lappeenranta Games in 2010.

Year	Tournament	Venue	Result	Extra
2006	Commonwealth Games	Melbourne, Australia	1st	100 m
2006	Commonwealth Games	Melbourne, Australia	5th	200 m
2006	Commonwealth Games	Melbourne, Australia	1st	4 × 100 m relay
2007	Pan American Games	Rio, Brazil	2nd	200 m
2007	Pan American Games	Rio, Brazil	1st	4 × 400 m relay
2007	World Championships	Osaka, Japan	2nd	4 × 100 m relay

=== Personal bests ===
- 100 metres – 11.05 s (2007)
- 200 metres – 22.78 s (2007)
- 400 metres – 53.95 s (2006)
