= Octavious Freeman =

American sprinter

Personal information
- Nationality: American
- Born: April 20, 1992 (age 34)

Sport
- Sport: Running
- Event(s): 60 metres, 100 metres, 200 metres
- Turned pro: 2013

Achievements and titles
- Personal best(s): 60 m: 7.15 s (2012) 100 m: 10.87 s (2013) 200 m: 22.55 s (2013)
Medal record
Women's athletics
Representing the United States
World Championships
Silver medal – second place	2013 Moscow	4×100 m relay

Octavious Freeman (born April 20, 1992) is an American sprinter who specializes in the 100 and 200 metres. Freeman qualified for the 2013 World Championships in Athletics in Moscow by placing second in the 100 metres at the 2013 USA Outdoor Track and Field Championships with a time of 10.87 (+1.8). In Moscow, Freeman placed 8th in the 100 metres with a time of 11.16 (-0.3).

Freeman competed for the UCF Knights track and field team in the NCAA.

== 2016 ==
Freeman ran 60 meters qualifying time for 2016 IAAF World Indoor Championships in Seattle, Washington January 16.
