= Hayley Jones (sprinter) =

British sprinter (born 1988)

Personal information
- Nationality: British
- Born: 14 September 1988 (age 37)

Sport
- Sport: Track and field
- Event: 100m
Medal record
Women's athletics
Representing United Kingdom
World Championships
Bronze medal – third place	2013 Moscow	4×100 m relay
European Athletics Junior Championships
Gold medal – first place	2007 Hengelo	200m
Gold medal – first place	2007 Hengelo	4x100m relay
Silver medal – second place	2007 Hengelo	4x400m relay

Hayley Jones (born 14 September 1988) is a British sprinter. She competed in the 4x100 metres relay event at the 2013 World Championships in Athletics, winning a bronze medal.
