= Alexandria Anderson =

American track and field sprinter

Medal record

Women's athletics

Representing the United States

World Championships
Gold medal – first place	2011 Daegu	4 × 100 m relay
Silver medal – second place	2013 Moscow	4 × 100 m relay

World Relay Championships
Gold medal – first place	2014 Nassau	4 × 100 m relay

World Junior Championships
Gold medal – first place	2004 Grosseto	4 × 400 m relay
Gold medal – first place	2006 Beijing	4 × 100 m relay

World Youth Championships
Gold medal – first place	2003 Sherbrooke	Medley relay

Alexandria Anderson (born January 28, 1987) is an American track and field sprinter who specializes in the 100-meter dash and 200-meter dash. She was the 2011 American champion in the 60-meter dash.

Anderson won four Chicago city volleyball titles at Morgan Park High School. She started running at the age of six in the streets against boys. She was recruited to run summer track and fell in love with the sport.

She was an All-American for University of Texas Longhorns. She won the NCAA outdoor 100 m in her senior year in 2009.

She earned a place on the 4 × 100 relay as an alternative in the 2009 IAAF World Championships in Athletics and 2011 World Championships in Athletics. She ran the second leg in the 2009 edition but the exchange was fumbled between her and third leg runner Muna Lee they were then disqualified. She won a gold medal running the anchor leg in the preliminary rounds stopping the clock in 41.94 in Daegu.

== Personal bests ==
Event	Time	Venue	Date
100 m	10.91 (1.8 m/s)	Des Moines, Iowa	June 22, 2013
200 m	22.60 (0.5 m/s)	Fayetteville, Arkansas	June 11, 2009
400 m	52.63	Charleston, Illinois	May 21, 2005
Long lump	6.32 (1.6 m/s)	Charleston, Illinois	May 20, 2005
