= Stephanie Kalu =

Nigerian sprinter

Personal information
- Nationality: Nigeria
- Born: Stephanie C. Kalu; 8 May 1993 (age 33) Texas, United States
- Height: 1.56 m (5 ft 1 1/2 in)

Sport
- Country: Nigeria
- Sport: Athletics
- Sprint: 100m 200m 4x100m
- College team: SMU Athletics

Achievements and titles
- Personal bests: 100 m: 11.33 s (2013); 60 m: 7.28 s (2014)

Stephanie Kalu (born 8 May 1993) is an American born Nigerian sprinter who specializes in the 100 metres, 200 metres and 4 x 100 metres. She has represented Nigeria at several meets including the 2012 World Junior Championships in Athletics, 2013 Summer Universiade and the 2013 World Championships in Athletics. She will also compete at the 2015 World Championships in Athletics while representing Nigeria.
