= 1994 European Athletics Championships – Women's 100 metres =

Women's 100 metres at the 1994 European Athletics Championships
- Venue: Helsinki Olympic Stadium
- Location: Helsinki
- Dates: 7 August (round 1 & round 2); 8 August (semifinals & final)
- Competitors: 20 from 10 nations
- Winning time: 11.02

Medalists
gold medal	Irina Privalova	Russia
silver medal	Zhanna Tarnopolskaya	Ukraine
bronze medal	Melanie Paschke	Germany

The women's 100 metres event at the 1994 European Athletics Championships was held in Helsinki, Finland, at Helsinki Olympic Stadium on 7 and 8 August 1994.

== Participation ==
According to an unofficial count, 32 athletes from 15 countries participated in the event.

- Austria (2)
- Bulgaria (3)
- Finland (2)
- France (3)
- Germany (2)
- Greece (2)
- Hungary (1)
- Italy (1)
- Netherlands (2)
- Portugal (1)
- Russia (3)
- Switzerland (3)
- Turkey (1)
- Ukraine (3)
- Great Britain (3)

== Results ==
=== Heats ===
7 August

==== Heat 1 ====
Rank	Name	Nationality	Time	Notes
1	Melanie Paschke	Germany	11.40	Q
2	Desislava Dimitrova	Bulgaria	11.43	Q
3	Odiah Sidibé	France	11.60	Q
4	Sara Wüest	Switzerland	11.65	Q
5	Ekaterini Koffa	Greece	11.71	
6	Aksel Gürcan	Turkey	11.81	
	Maya Azarashvili	Georgia	DNS	
			Wind: -0.6 m/s	

==== Heat 2 ====
Rank	Name	Nationality	Time	Notes
1	Zhanna Tarnopolskaya	Ukraine	11.13	Q
2	Sanna Hernesniemi	Finland	11.50	Q
3	Sabine Tröger	Austria	11.56	Q
4	Giada Gallina	Italy	11.66	Q
5	Marcia Richardson	Great Britain	11.69	q
6	Odile Singa	France	11.74	
7	Margret Haug	Switzerland	11.80	
			Wind: +0.3 m/s	

==== Heat 3 ====
Rank	Name	Nationality	Time	Notes
1	Paula Thomas	Great Britain	11.37	Q
2	Patricia Girard	France	11.47	Q
3	Natalya Anisimova	Russia	11.47	Q
4	Bettina Zipp	Germany	11.50	Q
5	Irina Slyusar	Ukraine	11.66	q
6	Eva Barati	Hungary	11.72	
7	Dagmar Hölbl	Austria	11.94	
			Wind: +0.4 m/s	

==== Heat 4 ====
Rank	Name	Nationality	Time	Notes
1	Nelli Cooman	Netherlands	11.35	Q
2	Marina Trandenkova	Russia	11.40	Q
3	Petya Pendareva	Bulgaria	11.41	Q
4	Lucrécia Jardim	Portugal	11.56	Q
5	Ekateríni Thánou	Greece	11.62	q
	Andrea Philipp	Germany	DNS	
			Wind: +0.2 m/s	

==== Heat 5 ====
Rank	Name	Nationality	Time	Notes
1	Irina Privalova	Russia	11.38	Q
2	Anelia Nuneva	Bulgaria	11.51	Q
3	Jacqueline Poelman	Netherlands	11.52	Q
4	Stephanie Douglas	Great Britain	11.60	Q
5	Regula Anliker-Aebi	Switzerland	11.65	q
6	Anzhela Kravchenko	Ukraine	11.78	
7	Anu Pirttimaa	Finland	11.81	
			Wind: +0.2 m/s	

=== Second round ===
7 August

==== Quarter-final 1 ====
Rank	Name	Nationality	Time	Notes
1	Melanie Paschke	Germany	11.31	Q
2	Nelli Cooman	Netherlands	11.41	Q
3	Petya Pendareva	Bulgaria	11.44	Q
4	Natalya Anisimova	Russia	11.48	Q
5	Patricia Girard	France	11.52	q
6	Lucrécia Jardim	Portugal	11.57	
7	Marcia Richardson	Great Britain	11.71	
8	Giada Gallina	Italy	11.79	
			Wind: +1.2 m/s	

==== Quarter-final 2 ====
Rank	Name	Nationality	Time	Notes
1	Zhanna Tarnopolskaya	Ukraine	11.01	Q
2	Marina Trandenkova	Russia	11.35	Q
3	Desislava Dimitrova	Bulgaria	11.36	Q
4	Jacqueline Poelman	Netherlands	11.37	Q
5	Stephanie Douglas	Great Britain	11.40	q
6	Sabine Tröger	Austria	11.44	q
7	Ekateríni Thánou	Greece	11.68	
8	Sara Wüest	Switzerland	11.70	
			Wind: +0.9 m/s	

==== Quarter-final 3 ====
Rank	Name	Nationality	Time	Notes
1	Irina Privalova	Russia	11.20	Q
2	Anelia Nuneva	Bulgaria	11.33	Q
3	Paula Thomas	Great Britain	11.42	Q
4	Sanna Hernesniemi	Finland	11.44	Q
5	Bettina Zipp	Germany	11.45	q
6	Odiah Sidibé	France	11.59	
7	Irina Slyusar	Ukraine	11.62	
8	Regula Anliker-Aebi	Switzerland	11.68	
			Wind: +0.3 m/s	

=== Semi-finals ===
8 August

==== Semi-final 1 ====
Rank	Name	Nationality	Time	Notes
1	Zhanna Tarnopolskaya	Ukraine	11.25	Q
2	Anelia Nuneva	Bulgaria	11.43	Q
3	Marina Trandenkova	Russia	11.53	Q
4	Petya Pendareva	Bulgaria	11.53	Q
5	Paula Thomas	Great Britain	11.58	
6	Jacqueline Poelman	Netherlands	11.65	
7	Bettina Zipp	Germany	11.69	
8	Sabine Tröger	Austria	11.72	
			Wind: +0.6 m/s	

==== Semi-final 2 ====
Rank	Name	Nationality	Time	Notes
1	Irina Privalova	Russia	11.18	Q
2	Melanie Paschke	Germany	11.30	Q
3	Nelli Cooman	Netherlands	11.38	Q
4	Sanna Hernesniemi	Finland	11.56	Q
5	Desislava Dimitrova	Bulgaria	11.56	
6	Patricia Girard	France	11.58	
7	Stephanie Douglas	Great Britain	11.60	
8	Natalya Anisimova	Russia	11.63	
			Wind: +0.6 m/s	

=== Final ===
8 August

Rank	Name	Nationality	Time	Notes
1st place, gold medalist(s)	Irina Privalova	Russia	11.02	
2nd place, silver medalist(s)	Zhanna Tarnopolskaya	Ukraine	11.10	
3rd place, bronze medalist(s)	Melanie Paschke	Germany	11.28	
4	Anelia Nuneva	Bulgaria	11.40	
5	Nelli Cooman	Netherlands	11.40	
6	Petya Pendareva	Bulgaria	11.41	
7	Sanna Hernesniemi	Finland	11.43	
8	Marina Trandenkova	Russia	11.52	
			Wind: +0.6 m/s	
