= 1993 World Championships in Athletics – Women's 100 metres =

These are the official results of the Women's 100 metres event at the 1993 IAAF World Championships in Stuttgart, Germany. There were a total number of 55 participating athletes, with seven qualifying heats, and the final was held on Monday 16 August.

The gold medallist (Devers) and the silver medallist (Ottey) were given the same time. As of 2024, the only other time this has happened in the women's 100 metres at these championships was in 2007.

== Final ==
RANK	FINAL	TIME
	Gail Devers (USA)	10.82 CR
	Merlene Ottey (JAM)	10.82 CR
	Gwen Torrence (USA)	10.89
4.	Irina Privalova (RUS)	10.96
5.	Mary Onyali (NGR)	11.05
6.	Natalya Voronova (RUS)	11.20
7.	Nikole Mitchell (JAM)	11.20
8.	Liliana Allen (CUB)	11.23

== Semifinals ==
- Held on Monday 1993-08-16

RANK	HEAT 1	TIME
1.	Merlene Ottey (JAM)	10.87
2.	Gwen Torrence (USA)	10.87
3.	Natalya Voronova (RUS)	11.17
4.	Liliana Allen (CUB)	11.19
5.	Pauline Davis (BAH)	11.21
6.	Elinda Vorster (RSA)	11.22
7.	Michelle Finn (USA)	11.25
8.	Zhanna Tarnopolskaya (UKR)	11.36

RANK	HEAT 2	TIME
1.	Gail Devers (USA)	11.03
2.	Irina Privalova (RUS)	11.06
3.	Mary Onyali (NGR)	11.06
4.	Nikole Mitchell (JAM)	11.26
5.	Melanie Paschke (GER)	11.28
6.	Sabine Tröger (AUT)	11.37
7.	Melinda Gainsford (AUS)	11.53
—	Beverly McDonald (JAM)	DNF

== Quarterfinals ==
- Held on Sunday 1993-08-15

RANK	HEAT 1	TIME
1.	Gwen Torrence (USA)	11.02
2.	Nicole Mitchell (JAM)	11.23
3.	Natalya Voronova (RUS)	11.29
4.	Liliana Allen (CUB)	11.30
5.	Petya Pendareva (BUL)	11.38
6.	Jacqueline Poelman (NED)	11.50
7.	N'Deye Binta Dia (SEN)	11.60
8.	Cleide Amaral (BRA)	11.68

RANK	HEAT 2	TIME
1.	Mary Onyali (NGR)	10.97
2.	Irina Privalova (RUS)	11.14
3.	Michelle Finn (USA)	11.21
4.	Beverly McDonald (JAM)	11.33
5.	Sanna Hernesniemi (FIN)	11.40
6.	Desislava Dimitrova (BUL)	11.45
7.	Wang Huei-Chen (TPE)	11.54
8.	Maguy Nestoret (FRA)	11.60

RANK	HEAT 3	TIME
1.	Merlene Ottey (JAM)	11.19
2.	Melanie Paschke (GER)	11.27
3.	Pauline Davis (BAH)	11.27
4.	Melinda Gainsford (AUS)	11.29
5.	Miriam Ferrer (CUB)	11.43
6.	Lucrecia Jardim (POR)	11.50
7.	Georgette Nkoma (CMR)	11.63
8.	Michelle Seymour (NZL)	11.79

RANK	HEAT 4	TIME
1.	Gail Devers (USA)	11.04
2.	Elinda Vorster (RSA)	11.24
3.	Sabine Troger (AUT)	11.29
4.	Zhanna Pintusevich (UKR)	11.30
5.	Olga Bogoslovskaya (RUS)	11.32
6.	Valerie Jean-Charles (FRA)	11.39
7.	Beverly Kinch (GBR)	11.40
8.	Philomena Mensah (GHA)	11.67

== Qualifying heats ==
- Held on Sunday 1993-08-15

RANK	HEAT 1	TIME
1.	Irina Privalova (RUS)	11.36
2.	Beverly McDonald (JAM)	11.37
3.	Michelle Finn (USA)	11.47
4.	Maguy Nestoret (FRA)	11.56
5.	N'Deye Binta Dia (SEN)	11.60
6.	Jariatou George (GAM)	12.46
7.	Natalie Martindale (VIN)	12.86
8.	Lusia Puleanga (TGA)	13.02

RANK	HEAT 2	TIME
1.	Petya Pendareva (BUL)	11.41
2.	Pauline Davis (BAH)	11.44
3.	Sabine Troger (AUT)	11.46
4.	Zhanna Pintusevich (UKR)	11.52
5.	Hermin Joseph (DMA)	11.62
6.	Lydia De Vega (PHI)	12.24
7.	Erin Tierney (COK)	13.16
8.	Wenona Steven (NRU)	14.70

RANK	HEAT 3	TIME
1.	Gail Devers (USA)	11.16
2.	Elinda Vorster (RSA)	11.31
3.	Nicole Mitchell (JAM)	11.36
4.	Valerie Jean-Charles (FRA)	11.46
5.	Hana Benesová (CZE)	11.72
6.	Oumou Sow (GUI)	12.52
7.	Feroza Khatton (BAN)	12.68
8.	Melvina Wulah (LBR)	12.70

RANK	HEAT 4	TIME
1.	Melinda Gainsford (AUS)	11.32
2.	Merlene Ottey (JAM)	11.36
3.	Lucrecia Jardim (POR)	11.47
4.	Cleide Amaral (BRA)	11.59
5.	Heather Samuel (ATG)	11.64
6.	Rita Pattipeilohy (INA)	12.44
7.	Isménia do Frederico (CPV)	13.03

RANK	HEAT 5	TIME
1.	Mary Onyali (NGR)	11.23
2.	Olga Bogoslovskaya (RUS)	11.40
3.	Wang Huei-Chen (TPE)	11.43
4.	Jacqueline Poelman (NED)	11.44
5.	Desislava Dimitrova (BUL)	11.55
6.	Philomena Mensah (GHA)	11.59
7.	Shabana Akhtar (PAK)	12.76
8.	Ovidia Luis Afonso (STP)	13.09

RANK	HEAT 6	TIME
1.	Natalya Voronova (RUS)	11.31
2.	Liliana Allen (CUB)	11.46
3.	Georgette Nkoma (CMR)	11.67
4.	Michelle Seymour (NZL)	11.68
5.	Odiah Sidibe (FRA)	11.69
6.	Dedra Davis (BAH)	12.00
7.	Rachelle Godonou (BEN)	12.93
8.	Said Nassianti (COM)	14.70

RANK	HEAT 7	TIME
1.	Melanie Paschke (GER)	11.31
2.	Gwen Torrence (USA)	11.43
3.	Beverly Kinch (GBR)	11.43
4.	Sanna Hernesniemi (FIN)	11.44
5.	Miriam Ferrer (CUB)	11.50
6.	Genevieve Obone (GAB)	12.57
7.	Deirdre Caruana (MLT)	12.60
8.	Thi Tuyet Mai Nguyen (VIE)	12.79

== See also ==
- 1992 Women's Olympic 100 metres
