= 1993 World Championships in Athletics – Women's 4 × 100 metres relay =

These are the official results of the Women's 4 × 100 metres event at the 1993 IAAF World Championships in Stuttgart, Germany. Their final was held on Sunday 1993-08-22.

== Final ==
RANK	NATION	ATHLETES	TIME
	Russia (RUS)	• Olga Bogoslovskaya • Galina Malchugina • Natalya Voronova • Irina Privalova	41.49 (CR)
	United States (USA)	• Michelle Finn • Gwen Torrence • Wendy Vereen • Gail Devers	41.49 (AR)
	Jamaica (JAM)	• Michelle Freeman • Juliet Campbell • Nikole Mitchell • Merlene Ottey	41.94 (NR)
4.	France (FRA)	• Patricia Girard • Odiah Sidibé • Valérie Jean-Charles • Marie-José Pérec	42.67
5.	Germany (GER)	• Andrea Philipp • Bettina Zipp • Silke-Beate Knoll • Melanie Paschke	42.79
6.	Cuba (CUB)	• Miriam Ferrer • Aliuska López • Julia Duporty • Liliana Allen	42.89 (NR)
7.	Finland (FIN)	• Anu Pirttimaa • Sisko Hanhijoki • Sanna Hernesniemi • Marja Salmela	43.37 (NR)
8.	Great Britain (GBR)	• Marcia Richardson • Beverly Kinch • Simmone Jacobs • Paula Thomas	43.86

== Heats ==
- Held on Saturday 1993-08-21

=== Heat 1 ===
RANK	NATION	ATHLETES	TIME
1.	United States (USA)	• Michelle Finn • Sheila Echols • Wendy Vereen • Gail Devers	42.34
2.	Jamaica (JAM)	• Michelle Freeman • Dahlia Duhaney • Nicole Mitchell • Juliet Campbell	42.40
3.	Germany (GER)	• Andrea Philipp • Bettina Zipp • Silke-Beate Knoll • Melanie Paschke	42.81
4.	Finland (FIN)	• Anu Pirttimaa • Sisko Hanhijoki • Sanna Hernesniemi • Marja Salmela	43.63
5.	Chinese Taipei (TPE)	• Kao Yu-Chuan • Chen Shu-Chen • Hsu Pei-Chin • Wang Huei-Chen	44.59
6.	Thailand (THA)	• Naparat Suajongprue • Dokjun Dokdung • Ratjai Sripet • Kwuanfah Inchareon	44.85

=== Heat 2 ===
RANK	NATION	ATHLETES	TIME
1.	Russia (RUS)	• Olga Bogoslovskaya • Galina Malchugina • Natalya Voronova • Marina Trandenkova	42.39
2.	France (FRA)	• Patricia Girard • Odiah Sidibé • Valérie Jean-Charles • Marie-José Pérec	43.31
3.	Cuba (CUB)	• Miriam Ferrer • Idalmis Bonne • Julia Duporty • Liliana Allen	43.48
4.	Great Britain (GBR)	• Marcia Richardson • Beverly Kinch • Simmone Jacobs • Paula Thomas	43.65
5.	Canada (CAN)	• Camille Noel • Stacey Bowen • Sonia Paquette • Donalda Duprey	44.36

== See also ==
- 1990 Women's European Championships 4 × 100 m Relay (Split)
- 1991 Women's World Championships 4 × 100 m Relay (Tokyo)
- 1992 Women's Olympic 4 × 100 m Relay (Barcelona)
- 1994 Women's European Championships 4 × 100 m Relay (Helsinki)
- 1995 Women's World Championships 4 × 100 m Relay (Gothenburg)
