= 1994 European Athletics Championships – Women's 4 × 100 metres relay =

Women's 4 × 100 metres relay at the European Athletics Championships

The women's 4 × 100 metres relay event at the 1994 European Athletics Championships was held in Helsinki, Finland, at Helsinki Olympic Stadium on 13 August 1994.

== Medalists ==
Gold	Melanie Paschke; Bettina Zipp; Silke Knoll; Silke Lichtenhagen; Germany
Silver	Natalya Anisimova; Galina Malchugina; Marina Trandenkova; Irina Privalova; Russia
Bronze	Desislava Dimitrova; Anelia Nuneva; Svetla Dimitrova; Petya Pendareva; Bulgaria

== Results ==
=== Final ===
13 August

Rank	Nation	Competitors	Time	Notes
1st place, gold medalist(s)	Germany	Melanie Paschke; Bettina Zipp; Silke Knoll; Silke Lichtenhagen	42.90	
2nd place, silver medalist(s)	Russia	Natalya Anisimova; Galina Malchugina; Marina Trandenkova; Irina Privalova	42.96	
3rd place, bronze medalist(s)	Bulgaria	Desislava Dimitrova; Anelia Nuneva; Svetla Dimitrova; Petya Pendareva	43.00	
4	Ukraine	Antonina Slyusar; Viktoriya Fomenko; Irina Slyusar; Zhanna Tarnopolskaya	43.61	
5	United Kingdom	Stephanie Douglas; Katharine Merry; Simmone Jacobs; Paula Thomas	43.63	
6	Netherlands	Claudia Elissen; Jacqueline Poelman; Karin de Lange; Monique Bogaards	43.81	
7	Finland	Anu Pirttimaa; Tarja Leveelahti; Sanna Hernesniemi; Marja Salmela	43.96	
8	Italy	Carla Tuzzi; Laura Ardissone; Anna Rita Balzani; Giada Gallina	44.46	

=== Heats ===
13 August

==== Heat 1 ====
Rank	Nation	Competitors	Time	Notes
1	Germany	Melanie Paschke; Bettina Zipp; Silke Knoll; Silke Lichtenhagen	42.94	Q
2	Bulgaria	Desislava Dimitrova; Anelia Nuneva; Svetla Dimitrova; Petya Pendareva	43.52	Q
3	Netherlands	Claudia Elissen; Jacqueline Poelman; Karin de Lange; Monique Bogaards	43.89	Q
4	Greece	Ekateríni Thánou; Effrosíni Patsoú; Maria Tsoni; Ekaterini Koffa	44.77	
5	Spain	Carme Blay; Cristina Castro; María del Carmen García; Yolanda Díaz	45.11	
	France	Patricia Girard; Odiah Sidibé; Odile Singa; Maguy Nestoret	DQ	
	Austria	Dagmar Hölbl; Sabine Tröger; Doris Auer; Karin Mayr-Krifka	DNF	

==== Heat 2 ====
Rank	Nation	Competitors	Time	Notes
1	Russia	Natalya Anisimova; Galina Malchugina; Marina Trandenkova; Yekaterina Leshcheva	43.36	Q
2	United Kingdom	Stephanie Douglas; Katharine Merry; Simmone Jacobs; Paula Thomas	44.03	Q
3	Finland	Anu Pirttimaa; Tarja Leveelahti; Sanna Hernesniemi; Marja Salmela	44.15	Q
4	Ukraine	Anzhela Kravchenko; Viktoriya Fomenko; Irina Slyusar; Antonina Slyusar	44.26	q
5	Italy	Carla Tuzzi; Laura Ardissone; Anna Rita Balzani; Giada Gallina	44.36	q
6	Switzerland	Mireille Donders; Margret Haug; Sara Wüest; Regula Anliker-Aebi	44.43	

== Participation ==
According to an unofficial count, 54 athletes from 13 countries participated in the event.

- Austria (4)
- Bulgaria (4)
- Finland (4)
- France (4)
- Germany (4)
- Greece (4)
- Italy (4)
- Netherlands (4)
- Russia (5)
- Spain (4)
- Switzerland (4)
- Ukraine (5)
- United Kingdom (4)
