= 1992 European Athletics U23 Cup =

I European Athletics U23 Cup
- Dates: 18–19 July
- Host city: Gateshead, United Kingdom; Villeneuve-d'Ascq, France
- Level: U-23
- Events: 35 (19 men, 16 women)

The 1st European Athletics U23 Cup was held on 18–19 July 1992. The participating teams were classified in two divisions, A and B.

The competition was restricted to athletes that did not complete their 23rd birthday in 1992, i.e. born in 1970 or later (including junior athletes). This rule was interpreted differently by Bulgaria and Greece, sending also athletes born in 1969.

== Division A ==
The contest for division A took place in Gateshead, United Kingdom. The teams from the Commonwealth of Independent States and Poland were withdrawn.

=== Team trophies ===
==== Men ====
The host country is highlighted in lavender blue

Rank	Nation	Points
1	Germany	95
2	United Kingdom	75
3	Italy	70
4	Finland	55
5	France	55
6	Spain	47
7	Commonwealth of Independent States	DNS
7	Poland	DNS

==== Women ====
The host country is highlighted in lavender blue

Rank	Nation	Points
1	United Kingdom	87
2	Germany	72
3	Romania	69
4	Italy	68
5	Czechoslovakia	67
6	Spain	46
7	Hungary	37
8	Commonwealth of Independent States	DNS

=== Results ===
Winners and results were published.

==== Men ====
Event	Gold		Silver		Bronze	
100 metres^{[nb1]} (wind: -3.5 m/s)	Christian Konieczny; Germany	10.92	Andrea Amici; Italy	10.94	Pedro Pablo Nolet; Spain	11.04
200 metres (wind: -2.6 m/s)	Giorgio Marras; Italy	21.17	Alexander Lack; Germany	21.31	Steve Gookey; Great Britain	21.31
400 metres	David Grindley; Great Britain	45.57	Florian Hennig; Germany	46.90	Thierry Jean-Charles; France	47.19
800 metres	Curtis Robb; Great Britain	1:49.46	Davide Cadoni; Italy	1:49.78	Mark Eplinius; Germany	1:49.91
1500 metres	Abdelkader Chékhémani; France	4:03.64	Jörg Schneider; Germany	4:03.90	Amos Rota; Italy	4:04.30
5000 metres	Francesco Bennici; Italy	13:31.79	Carsten Eich; Germany	13:32.25	Jon Brown; Great Britain	13:33.06
3000 metres steeplechase	Keith Cullen; Great Britain	8:37.74	Kim Bauermeister; Germany	8:51.02	Albert Casals; Spain	8:56.35
110 metres hurdles (wind: -1.3 m/s)	Mike Fenner; Germany	13.94	Antti Haapakoski; Finland	13.97	Laurent Ottoz; Italy	13.97
400 metres hurdles	Enzo Franciosi; Italy	50.76	Ismo Hameenniemi; Finland	51.59	Alain Droguet; France	51.67
4 × 100 metres relay^{[nb2]}	Germany (GER)	39.67	Italy (ITA)	39.96	Spain (ESP); Frutos Feo; Jose Carlos Rivas; Luis Turón; Pedro Pablo Nolet	40.03
4 × 400 metres relay	Great Britain (GBR); David McKenzie; David Greenling; Mark Richardson; Du'aine Ladejo	3:01.03	Germany (GER)	3:07.93	France (FRA)	3:08.16
High jump	Steve Smith; Great Britain	2.25 m	Hendrik Beyer; Germany	2.25 m	Javier López-Barajas; Spain	2.15 m
Pole vault	Tim Lobinger; Germany	5.50 m	Petri Peltoniemi; Finland	5.40 m	Gérald Baudouin; France	5.30 m
Long jump	Georg Ackermann; Germany	7.94 m	Jean-Luc Poussin; France	7.62 m	Luca Passera; Italy	7.47 m
Triple jump	Julian Golley; Great Britain	16.21 m	Hrvoje Verzi; Germany	16.03 m	Julio López; Spain	16.02 m
Shot put	Markus Koistinen; Finland	18.65 m	Thorsten Herbrand; Germany	18.50 m	Matthew Simson; Great Britain	18.22 m
Discus throw	Glen Smith; Great Britain	57.58 m	Cristian Ponton; Italy	55.08 m	Sven Schwarz; Germany	55.02 m
Hammer throw	Jason Byrne; Great Britain	71.86 m	Karsten Kobs; Germany	70.16 m	David Chaussinand; France	69.18 m
Javelin throw	Mika Parviainen; Finland	77.26 m	Myles Cottrell; Great Britain	71.36 m	Christian Benninger; Germany	71.36 m

- ^{nb1} : The 100 m event was initially won by Jason Livingston from the United Kingdom (10.72s), but he was disqualified for infringement of IAAF doping rules.
- ^{nb2} : The 4 × 100 m relay event was initially won by the United Kingdom (39.11s), but the team was disqualified for infringement of IAAF doping rules by team member Jason Livingston.

==== Women ====
Event	Gold		Silver		Bronze	
100 metres (wind: +1.1 m/s)	Aileen McGillivary; Great Britain	11.65	Melanie Paschke; Germany	11.75	Laura Galligani; Italy	11.95
200 metres (wind: -3.1 m/s)	Paula Cohen; Great Britain	24.10	Giada Gallina; Italy	24.15	Jana Schönenberger; Germany	24.30
400 metres^{[nb3]}	Julia Merino; Spain	52.91	Ionela Târlea; Romania	53.69		
800 metres	Fabia Trabaldo; Italy	2:03.91	Birte Bruhns; Germany	2:04.44	Liliana Sălăgean; Romania	2:04.94
1500 metres	Lisa York; Great Britain	4:09.34	Gabriela Szabo; Romania	4:13.11	Katje Hoffmann; Germany	4:17.04
3000 metres	Paula Radcliffe; Great Britain	9:07.69	Gabriela Szabo; Romania	9:12.27	Andrea Sollárová; Czechoslovakia	9:12.53
100 metres hurdles (wind: -2.3 m/s)	Keri Maddox; Great Britain	13.63	Giuliana Spada; Italy	13.88	Mona Steigauf; Germany	13.91
400 metres hurdles	Louise Fraser; Great Britain	56.73	Gesine Schmidt; Germany	56.87	Elisa Manni; Italy	57.05
4 × 100 metres relay	Germany (GER)	44.08	Great Britain (GBR); Aileen McGillivary; Marcia Richardson; Geraldine MclLod; Katharine Merry	44.15	Italy (ITA)	45.50
4 × 400 metres relay^{[nb4]}	Czechoslovakia (TCH)	3:33.87	Great Britain (GBR); Michelle Thomas; Nicola Crowther; Claire Raven; Louise Fraser	3:34.46		
High jump	Antonella Bevilacqua; Italy	1.92 m	Šárka Nováková; Czechoslovakia	1.92 m	Oana Musunoiu; Romania	1.88 m
Long jump	Monica Toth; Romania	6.36 m w	Yinka Idowu; Great Britain	6.20 m	Elisa Andretti; Italy	6.15 m
Triple jump	Šárka Kašpárková; Czechoslovakia	14.00 m	Concepción Paredes; Spain	13.78 m	Ashia Hansen; Great Britain	13.31 m
Shot put	Heike Hopfer; Germany	17.04 m	Anna Luongo; Italy	15.89 m	Monika Stefanovic; Hungary	15.80 m
Discus throw	Nicoleta Gradinaru; Romania	62.58 m	Anja Gündler; Germany	58.54 m	Petra Jurásková; Czechoslovakia	53.40 m
Javelin throw	Susanne Riewe; Germany	57.78 m	Mandy Liverton; Great Britain	56.74 m	Claudia Isaila; Romania	55.98 m

- ^{nb3} The 400 m event was initially won by Manuela Derr from Germany (52.86s), but she was disqualified for infringement of IAAF doping rules.
- ^{nb4} The 4 × 400 m relay event was initially won by Germany (3:32.69), but the team was disqualified for infringement of IAAF doping rules by team member Manuela Derr.

== Division B ==
The competition for division B took place in Villeneuve-d'Ascq, France.

=== Team scores ===
==== Men ====
The host country is highlighted in lavender blue

Rank	Nation	Points
1	Czechoslovakia	109
2	Sweden	108
3	Hungary	93
4	Greece	73
5	Romania	71
6	Portugal	71
7	Bulgaria	69
7	Switzerland	69

==== Women ====
The host country is highlighted in lavender blue

Rank	Nation	Points
1	France	101
2	Finland	87
3	Bulgaria	79
4	Sweden	72.5
5	Portugal	70
6	Netherlands	69
7	Norway	59.5
8	Belgium	36

=== Results ===
Winners and results were published.

==== Men ====
Event	Gold		Silver	Bronze
100 metres (wind: -0.1 m/s)	Georgios Theodoridis; Greece	10.61		
200 metres (wind: -0.7 m/s)	László Kiss; Hungary	21.29		
400 metres	A Sachov; Bulgaria	46.58		
800 metres	Pavel Soukup; Czechoslovakia	1:49.05		
1500 metres	Patrik Johansson; Sweden	3:42.77		
5000 metres	Claes Nyberg; Sweden	13:59.16		
3000 metres steeplechase	Florin Ionescu; Romania	8:53.72		
110 metres hurdles (wind: -0.9 m/s)	Claes Albihn; Sweden	13.78		
400 metres hurdles	Pedro Rodrigues; Portugal	50.17		
4 × 100 metres relay	Hungary (HUN); György Dobos; László Kiss; I Sami; Csaba Asztalos	40.47		
4 × 400 metres relay	Hungary (HUN); Miklós Arpasi; Miklós Gyulai; Tibor Szél; Dusán Kovács	3:10.55		
High jump	Tomáš Janků; Czechoslovakia	2.19 m		
Pole vault	Martin Eriksson; Sweden	5.40 m		
Long jump	Konstadinos Koukodimos; Greece	8.15 m (wind: +0.0 m/s)		
Triple jump	Tibor Ordina; Hungary	16.38 m (wind: +1.8 m/s)		
Shot put	Miroslav Menc; Czechoslovakia	18.04 m		
Discus throw	Ionel Oprea; Romania	57.22 m		
Hammer throw	Savas Saritzoglou; Greece	71.88 m		
Javelin throw	Joakim Nilsson; Sweden	73.96 m		

==== Women ====
Event	Gold		Silver		Bronze	
100 metres (wind: -0.2 m/s)	Lucrécia Jardim; Portugal	11.44	Petya Pendareva; Bulgaria	11.51	Odiah Sidibé; France	11.52
200 metres (wind: -0.6 m/s)	Lucrécia Jardim; Portugal	23.28	Petya Pendareva; Bulgaria	23.31	Anita Mormand; France	23.32
400 metres	Francine Landre; France	52.43	Ester Goossens; Netherlands	53.43	Anna-Karin Svantesson; Sweden	54.15
800 metres	Patricia Djaté; France	2:08.08	Susana Cabral; Portugal	2:08.92	Marjo Piipponen; Finland	2:09.15
1500 metres	Malin Ewerlöf; Sweden	4:22.42	Céline Martin; France	4:23.09	Olga Jeleva; Bulgaria	4:23.42
3000 metres	Marina Bastos; Portugal	9:14.71	Gunhild Halle; Norway	9:18.04	H Nikkanen; Finland	9:26.13
100 metres hurdles (wind: -0.8 m/s)	Annette Simon; France	13.60	Marika Salminen; Finland	13.75	Sandra Barreiro; Portugal	13.89
400 metres hurdles	Frida Johansson; Sweden	56.08	Carole Nelson; France	56.61	Mari Bjone; Norway	58.50
4 × 100 metres relay	France (FRA); Anita Mormand; Odiah Sidibé; Florence Ropars; Christine Arron	44.54	Bulgaria (BUL); Petya Pendareva; D Petkova; Desislava Dimitrova; Ekaterina Tocheva	44.89	Netherlands (NED); Petra Huybrechtse; Jacqueline Poelman; Anoek van Diessen; Elja den Os	45.26
4 × 400 metres relay	France (FRA); Marie-Louise Bévis; Nicole Hylaire; F Borelys; Francine Landre	3:36.12	Sweden (SWE); Anna-Karin Svantesson; Monica Lundgren; Asa Carlsson; Marie Westerlund	3:36.70	Netherlands (NED); Ester Goossens; Jorien Kranendijk; Marianne de Vries; Anoek van Diessen	3:40.47
High jump	Desislava Aleksandrova; Bulgaria	1.87 m	Heidi Paesen; Belgium	1.85 m	Katja Kilpi; Finland	1.82 m
Long jump	Iva Prandzheva; Bulgaria	6.62 m (wind: -1.2 m/s)	Erica Johansson; Sweden	6.58 m (wind: +1.6 m/s)	Cristina Morujão; Portugal	6.28 m (wind: +1.6 m/s)
Triple jump	Caroline Honoré; France	13.37 m w (wind: +2.6 m/s)	Marika Salminen; Finland	13.18 m (wind: +0.2 m/s)	Lene Espegren; Norway	12.80 m w (wind: +2.2 m/s)
Shot put	Corrie de Bruin; Netherlands	16.38 m	Marika Tuliniemi; Finland	16.12 m	Linda-Marie Mårtensson; Sweden	15.96 m
Discus throw	Jacqueline Goormachtigh; Netherlands	58.36 m	Annika Larsson; Sweden	53.14 m	Atanaska Angelova; Bulgaria	50.50 m
Javelin throw	Heli Rantanen; Finland	60.76 m	Nathalie Teppe; France	54.26 m	Helena Gouveia; Portugal	50.92 m
