= 1994 European Athletics Indoor Championships – Women's 60 metres =

The women's 60 metres event at the 1994 European Athletics Indoor Championships was held in Palais Omnisports de Paris-Bercy on 12 March.

== Medalists ==
Gold	Silver	Bronze
Nelli Cooman; Netherlands	Melanie Paschke; Germany	Patricia Girard; France

== Results ==
=== Heats ===
First 2 from each heat (Q) and the next 2 fastest (q) qualified for the semifinals.

Rank	Heat	Name	Nationality	Time	Notes
1	1	Melanie Paschke	Germany	7.23	Q
2	2	Nelli Cooman	Netherlands	7.26	Q
3	2	Desislava Dimitrova	Bulgaria	7.27	Q
3	4	Olga Bogoslovskaya	Russia	7.27	Q
3	5	Patricia Girard	France	7.27	Q
6	5	Jacqueline Poelman	Netherlands	7.29	Q
6	2	Sabine Tröger	Austria	7.30	q
7	3	Petya Pendareva	Bulgaria	7.31	Q
8	4	Bettina Zipp	Germany	7.32	Q
9	4	Odiah Sidibé	France	7.35	q
9	5	Éva Barati	Hungary	7.35	
11	1	Marie-Joëlle Dogbo	France	7.38	Q
11	1	Hana Benešová	Czech Republic	7.38	PB
11	2	Sanna Hernesniemi	Finland	7.38	
14	3	Silke Lichtenhagen	Germany	7.39	Q
15	3	Sonia Vigati	Italy	7.40	
16	3	Natalya Anisimova	Russia	7.43	
17	2	Cathy Lenoir	Belgium	7.50	
17	3	Edit Molnár	Hungary	7.50	
19	4	Martha Grossenbacher	Switzerland	7.53	
19	5	Yolanda Díaz	Spain	7.53	
19	5	Valerie Denis	Belgium	7.53	
22	5	Christina Schnohr	Denmark	7.58	
23	3	Aksel Gürcan	Turkey	7.61	
24	4	Zdenka Mušínská	Czech Republic	7.63	
25	2	Geirlaug Geirlaugsdóttir	Iceland	7.78	
26	1	Nancy Callaerts	Belgium	7.85	
	1	Maia Azarashvili	Georgia	DNS	

=== Semifinals ===
First 3 from each semifinal qualified directly (Q) for the final.

Rank	Heat	Name	Nationality	Time	Notes
1	2	Patricia Girard	France	7.16	Q
2	2	Petya Pendareva	Bulgaria	7.18	Q
3	2	Melanie Paschke	Germany	7.18	Q
4	1	Nelli Cooman	Netherlands	7.19	Q
5	1	Sabine Tröger	Austria	7.26	Q
5	2	Jacqueline Poelman	Netherlands	7.26	PB
7	1	Desislava Dimitrova	Bulgaria	7.27	Q
8	1	Marie-Joëlle Dogbo	France	7.27	
9	1	Olga Bogoslovskaya	Russia	7.29	
9	2	Odiah Sidibé	France	7.29	
11	1	Bettina Zipp	Germany	7.29	
12	2	Silke Lichtenhagen	Germany	7.42	

=== Final ===
Rank	Lane	Name	Nationality	Time	Notes
1st place, gold medalist(s)	6	Nelli Cooman	Netherlands	7.17	
2nd place, silver medalist(s)	3	Melanie Paschke	Germany	7.19	
3rd place, bronze medalist(s)	5	Patricia Girard	France	7.19	
4	4	Petya Pendareva	Bulgaria	7.24	
5	2	Desislava Dimitrova	Bulgaria	7.25	
6	1	Sabine Tröger	Austria	7.31	
