= 1993 IAAF World Indoor Championships – Women's 60 metres =

The women's 60 metres event at the 1993 IAAF World Indoor Championships was held on 12 March.

== Medalists ==
Gold	Silver	Bronze
Gail Devers; United States	Irina Privalova; Russia	Zhanna Tarnopolskaya; Ukraine

== Results ==
=== Heats ===
First 3 of each heat (Q) and next 4 fastest (q) qualified for the semifinals.

Rank	Heat	Name	Nationality	Time	Notes
1	4	Gail Devers	United States	7.18	Q
2	1	Irina Privalova	Russia	7.22	Q
2	3	Zhanna Tarnopolskaya	Ukraine	7.22	Q
4	2	Teresa Neighbors	United States	7.32	Q
5	3	Liliana Allen	Cuba	7.33	Q
5	4	Beverly Kinch	Great Britain	7.33	Q
7	4	Nelli Fiere-Cooman	Netherlands	7.34	Q
8	1	Patricia Girard	France	7.35	Q
9	1	Melinda Gainsford-Taylor	Australia	7.36	Q
10	2	Sisko Hanhijoki	Finland	7.37	Q
10	3	Olga Bogoslovskaya	Russia	7.37	Q
12	3	Marcia Richardson	Great Britain	7.38	q
13	1	Patricia Foufoué Ziga	Ivory Coast	7.39	q
13	1	Sanna Hernesniemi	Finland	7.39	q
13	4	Sabine Tröger	Austria	7.39	q
16	3	Melanie Paschke	Germany	7.42	
17	2	Karen Clarke	Canada	7.44	Q
18	2	Sara Wüest	Switzerland	7.44	
19	1	N'Deye Binta Dia	Senegal	7.46	
19	1	Jacqueline Poelman	Netherlands	7.46	
19	2	Beatrice Utondu	Nigeria	7.46	
19	4	Marcel Winkler	South Africa	7.46	NR
23	3	Michelle Walsh-Carroll	Ireland	7.47	
24	2	Cathy Freeman	Australia	7.48	
25	3	Wang Huei-Chen	Chinese Taipei	7.52	
26	4	Keturah Anderson	Canada	7.58	
27	1	Éva Barati	Hungary	7.63	
27	4	Chen Zhaojing	China	7.63	
29	3	Elvira Dzhabarova	Azerbaijan	7.68	NR
	2	Merlene Ottey	Jamaica	DNS	
	2	Gail Prescod	Saint Vincent and the Grenadines	DNS	
	4	Christy Opara-Thompson	Nigeria	DNS	

=== Semifinals ===
First 3 of each semifinal (Q) and the next 2 fastest (q) qualified for the final.

Rank	Heat	Name	Nationality	Time	Notes
1	1	Gail Devers	United States	7.06	Q
2	2	Irina Privalova	Russia	7.08	Q
3	1	Zhanna Tarnopolskaya	Ukraine	7.21	Q
4	1	Liliana Allen	Cuba	7.25	Q
5	1	Patricia Foufoué Ziga	Ivory Coast	7.26	q
5	2	Teresa Neighbors	United States	7.26	Q
7	1	Nelli Fiere-Cooman	Netherlands	7.28	q
8	1	Olga Bogoslovskaya	Russia	7.31	
8	2	Patricia Girard	France	7.31	Q
8	2	Sanna Hernesniemi	Finland	7.31	
11	1	Sisko Hanhijoki	Finland	7.34	
11	2	Beverly Kinch	Great Britain	7.34	
13	2	Sabine Tröger	Austria	7.36	
14	1	Marcia Richardson	Great Britain	7.41	
15	2	Melinda Gainsford-Taylor	Australia	7.43	
16	2	Karen Clarke	Canada	7.53	

=== Final ===
Rank	Name	Nationality	Time	Notes
1st place, gold medalist(s)	Gail Devers	United States	6.95	CR
2nd place, silver medalist(s)	Irina Privalova	Russia	6.97	
3rd place, bronze medalist(s)	Zhanna Tarnopolskaya	Ukraine	7.21	
4	Liliana Allen	Cuba	7.22	
5	Teresa Neighbors	United States	7.26	
6	Patricia Foufoué Ziga	Ivory Coast	7.26	
7	Nelli Fiere-Cooman	Netherlands	7.29	
8	Patricia Girard	France	7.31	
