= 1994 European Cup (athletics) =

- Dates: 25–26 June (Super Leagues); 11–12 June (First Leagues); 12–13 June (Second Leagues)
- Host city: Birmingham, United Kingdom
- Venue: Alexander Stadium
- Level: Senior
- Type: Outdoor
- Events: 37

The 1994 European Cup was the 15th edition of the European Cup of athletics. From this edition on, the event was held annually until 2011.

The Super League Finals were held in Birmingham, Great Britain between 25–26 June 1994. The first two teams qualified for the 1994 IAAF World Cup.

== Super League ==
Held on 25 and 26 June in Birmingham, United Kingdom.

=== Team standings ===
Men
Pos.	Nation	Points
1	Germany	121
2	Great Britain	106.5
3	Russia	101
4	Ukraine	87
5	Italy	84
6	Sweden	81.5
7	France	80
8	Romania	55

Women
Pos.	Nation	Points
1	Germany	98
2	Great Britain	97
3	Russia	95
4	Ukraine	86
5	Belarus	64
6	France	60
7	Romania	60
8	Spain	50

=== Results summary ===
==== Men's events ====
Event	Gold		Silver		Bronze	
100 m (Wind: +0.9 m/s)	Linford Christie; Great Britain	10.21	Marc Blume; Germany	10.37	Pavel Galkin; Russia	10.42
200 m (Wind: -0.1 m/s)	Linford Christie; Great Britain	20.67	Sergey Osovich; Ukraine	20.70	Daniel Sangouma; France	21.04
400 m	Roger Black; Great Britain	45.08	Jean-Louis Rapnouil; France	46.43	Dmitriy Golovastov; Russia	46.58
800 m	Nico Motchebon; Germany	1:48.10	Davide Cadoni; Italy	1:48.42	Craig Winrow; Great Britain	1:48.76
1500 m	Andrey Bulkovskiy; Ukraine	3:49.33	Rüdiger Stenzel; Germany	3:49.38	Gary Lough; Great Britain	3:49.57
5000 m	Dieter Baumann; Germany	13:48.95	Abdellah Béhar; France	13:49.12	Ovidiu Olteanu; Romania	13:49.43
10,000 m	Francesco Panetta; Italy	28:38.45	Stéphane Franke; Germany	28:38.99	Oleg Strizhakov; Russia	29:03.55
3000 m steeplechase	Alessandro Lambruschini; Italy	8:24.98	Steffen Brand; Germany	8:27.83	Justin Chaston; Great Britain	8:29.99
110 m hurdles (Wind: +1.9 m/s)	Florian Schwarthoff; Germany	13.35	Vladimir Belokon; Ukraine	13.62	Andy Tulloch; Great Britain	13.65
400 m hurdles	Sven Nylander; Sweden	49.36	Oleg Tverdokhleb; Ukraine	49.37	Stéphane Diagana; France	49.47
4 × 100 m	Great Britain; Jason John; Solomon Wariso; John Regis; Linford Christie	38.72	Ukraine; Sergey Osovich; Dmitriy Vanyakin; Oleg Kramarenko; Vladislav Dologodin	38.79	Germany; Holger Blume; Steffen Görmer; Michael Huke; Marc Blume	38.81
4 × 400 m	Great Britain; Du'aine Ladejo; Adrian Patrick; Brian Whittle; Roger Black	3:02.50	Russia; Dmitriy Golovastov; Mikhail Vdovin; Ruslan Mashchenko; Dmitriy Kosov	3:03.57	France; Jean-Louis Rapnouil; Bruno Konczylo; Pierre-Marie Hilaire; Stéphane Diagana	3:03.74
High jump	Wolf-Hendrik Beyer; Germany	2.25	Patrick Thavelin; Sweden	2.20	Dalton Grant; Great Britain	2.20
Pole vault	Jean Galfione; France	5.70	Patrik Stenlund; Sweden	5.60	Tim Lobinger; Germany	5.60
Long jump	Oleg Tarasenko; Russia	8.02	Dietmar Haaf; Germany	7.84	Bogdan Tudor; Romania	7.78
Triple jump	Denis Kapustin; Russia	17.30	Tord Henriksson; Sweden	16.99	Serge Hélan; France	16.92
Shot put	Paolo Dal Soglio; Italy	19.69	Roman Virastyuk; Ukraine	19.40	Gheorghe Guset; Romania	19.23
Discus throw	Dmitriy Shevchenko; Russia	64.74	Jürgen Schult; Germany	64.42	Vladimir Zinchenko; Ukraine	62.80
Hammer throw	Vasiliy Sidorenko; Russia	78.76	Andrey Skvaruk; Ukraine	78.20	Christophe Épalle; France	78.16
Javelin throw	Andrey Moruyev; Russia	87.34	Raymond Hecht; Germany	85.40	Mick Hill; Great Britain	85.28
WR world record | AR area record | CR championship record | GR games record | NR national record | OR Olympic record | PB personal best | SB season best | WL world leading (in a given season)

==== Women's events ====
Event	Gold		Silver		Bronze	
100 m (Wind: +0.8 m/s)	Zhanna Tarnopolskaya; Ukraine	11.26	Katharine Merry; Great Britain	11.34	Melanie Paschke; Germany	11.37
200 m (Wind: -2.9 m/s)	Silke Knoll; Germany	23.04	Katharine Merry; Great Britain	23.38	Oksana Dyachenko; Ukraine	23.65
400 m	Svetlana Goncharenko; Russia	52.08	Melanie Neef; Great Britain	52.43	Francine Landre; France	52.86
800 m	Diane Modahl; Great Britain	2:02.81	Patricia Djaté; France	2:02.95	Yelena Zavadskaya; Ukraine	2:04.43
1500 m	Lyubov Kremlyova; Russia	4:05.97	Kelly Holmes; Great Britain	4:06.48	Violeta Beclea; Romania	4:09.26
3000 m	Lyudmila Borisova; Russia	8:52.21	Farida Fatès; France	8:53.40	Sonia McGeorge; Great Britain	8:55.47
10,000 m	Kathrin Wessel; Germany	32:26.85	Rosario Murcia; France	32:59.80	Rocío Ríos; Spain	33:22.18
100 m hurdles (Wind: -1.4 m/s)	Jacqui Agyepong; Great Britain	13.00	Yuliya Graudyn; Russia	13.07	Anne Piquereau; France	13.21
400 m hurdles	Sally Gunnell; Great Britain	54.62	Tatyana Tereshchuk; Ukraine	55.04	Tatyana Kurochkina; Belarus	56.02
4 × 100 m	Ukraine; Irina Slyusar; Viktoriya Fomenko; Anzhela Kravchenko; Zhanna Tarnopolskaya	43.38	Great Britain; Stephanie Douglas; Katharine Merry; Simmone Jacobs; Paula Thomas	43.46	Germany; Bettina Zipp; Silke Lichtenhagen; Silke Knoll; Melanie Paschke	44.24
4 × 400 m	Great Britain; Melanie Neef; Tracy Goddard; Phylis Smith; Sally Gunnell	3:27.33	Germany; Jana Schönenberger; Uta Rohländer; Angelika Haggenmüller; Heike Meissner	3:27.78	Russia; Yelena Golesheva; Vera Sychugova; Yelena Andreyeva; Svetlana Goncharenko	3:28.85
High jump	Tatyana Shevchik; Belarus	1.94	Monica Iagar; Romania	1.91	Yelena Gulyayeva; Russia	1.88
Long jump	Heike Drechsler; Germany	6.99	Olga Rublyova; Russia	6.65	Larisa Kuchinskaya; Belarus	6.54
Triple jump	Helga Radtke; Germany	13.90	Rodica Petrescu; Romania	13.83	Concepción Paredes; Spain	13.81
Shot put	Astrid Kumbernuss; Germany	19.63	Valentina Fedyushina; Ukraine	19.30	Larisa Peleshenko; Russia	18.86
Discus throw	Ilke Wyludda; Germany	68.36	Olga Nikishina; Ukraine	63.48	Ellina Zvereva; Belarus	62.92
Javelin throw	Natalya Shikolenko; Belarus	69.00	Karen Forkel; Germany	65.58	Felicia Tilea; Romania	63.88
WR world record | AR area record | CR championship record | GR games record | NR national record | OR Olympic record | PB personal best | SB season best | WL world leading (in a given season)

== First League ==
First League was held on 11 and 12 June in Valencia, Spain Thanks to the expansion of the First League to two Groups from the next edition, no teams needed to be relegated.

Men
Pos.	Nation	Points
1	Spain	113
2	Poland	112.5
3	Belarus	102
4	Greece	95.5
5	Hungary	89
6	Czech Republic	83
7	Bulgaria	71
8	Denmark	52

Women
Pos.	Nation	Points
1	Poland	106
2	Italy	94
3	Portugal	81
4	Czech Republic	80
5	Finland	72
6	Switzerland	68
7	Lithuania	64
8	Austria	43

== Second League ==
The Second League was held on 12 and 13 June

=== Men ===
Group 1
Held in Dublin, Ireland

Pos.	Nation	Points
1	Belgium	102
2	Netherlands	97
3	Portugal	95
4	Ireland	90
5	Lithuania	77
6	Iceland	63
7	AASSE	35

Group 2
Held in Istanbul, Turkey

Pos.	Nation	Points
1	Norway	107
2	Switzerland	100
3	Slovakia	89
4	Cyprus	72
5	Israel	70
6	Croatia	68
7	Turkey	54

Group 3
Held in Ljubljana, Slovenia

Pos.	Nation	Points
1	Finland	127
2	Latvia	96
3	Slovenia	90.5
4	Austria	89.5
5	Estonia	67
6	Moldova	56
7	Albania	30

=== Women ===
Group 1
Held in Dublin, Ireland

Pos.	Nation	Points
1	Netherlands	99
2	Belgium	88
3	Greece	76
4	Denmark	74
5	Ireland	62
6	Iceland	55
7	AASSE	22

Group 2
Held in Istanbul, Turkey

Pos.	Nation	Points
1	Bulgaria	106
2	Norway	97
3	Turkey	74
4	Slovakia	65
5	Croatia	49
6	Cyprus	48
7	Israel	36

Group 3
Held in Ljubljana, Slovenia

Pos.	Nation	Points
1	Sweden	97
2	Hungary	95
3	Slovenia	78
4	Latvia	62
5	Estonia	58
6	Moldova	53
7	Albania	27
