= 50 metres =

Sprint race

Athletics 50 metres

World records
- Men: (Canada) Donovan Bailey 5.56 A (1996)
- Women: (Russia) Irina Privalova 5.96 (1995)

50 metres, or 50-meter dash, is a sprint event in track and field, featured as an alternative to the 60 metres running event. It is a relatively uncommon non-championship event for indoor track and field, normally dominated by the best outdoor 100 metres runners. At outdoor athletics competitions it is used in the Special Olympics but otherwise a rare distance. The World Masters Rankings has recorded the event since the 2010s.

Records and personal bests in the 50 metres are frequently achieved in February and March as these dates coincide with the indoor athletics season.

The 50 yards (45.72 m) is the imperial distance analogue to the 50 meters. It was contested at the women's USA Outdoor Track and Field Championships from 1923 to 1932 and the women's USA Indoor Track and Field Championships from 1956 to 1964. It was not contested as a men's event. The championship records were 5.8 seconds by Betty Robinson outdoors and 5.7 seconds by Isabelle Daniels indoors.

== All-time top 25 ==
Indoor results only
+ = en route to a longer distance
A = affected by altitude

=== Men ===
- Updated February 2025.

Rank	Time	Athlete	Nation	Date	Place	Ref.
1	5.56 A ^{[B]}	Donovan Bailey	Canada	9 February 1996	Reno	
1	5.56	Maurice Greene	United States	13 February 1999	Los Angeles	
3	5.58+	Leonard Scott	United States	26 February 2005	Liévin	
4	5.60+	Michael Green	Jamaica	16 February 1997	Liévin	
5	5.61	Manfred Kokot	East Germany	4 February 1973	Berlin	
5	5.61	James Sanford	United States	20 February 1981	San Diego	
5	5.61+	Deji Aliu	Nigeria	21 February 1999	Liévin	
5	5.61+	Freddy Mayola	Cuba	16 February 2000	Madrid	
5	5.61+	Jason Gardener	Great Britain	16 February 2000	Madrid	
10	5.62	Emmit King	United States	5 March 1986	Kobe	
10	5.62	Andre Cason	United States	15 February 1992	Los Angeles	
10	5.62+	Eric Nkansah	Ghana	21 February 1999	Liévin	
10	5.62+	Morné Nagel	South Africa	24 February 2002	Liévin	
14	5.63	Stanley Floyd	United States	20 February 1981	San Diego	
14	5.63 A	Henry Neal	United States	10 February 1995	Reno	
14	5.63	Jon Drummond	United States	13 February 1999	Los Angeles	
14	5.63+	Lerone Clarke	Jamaica	14 February 2012	Liévin	
14	5.63+	Ronnie Baker	United States	4 February 2025	Ostrava	
19	5.64	Davidson Ezinwa	Nigeria	15 February 1992	Los Angeles	
19	5.64	Aleksandr Porkhomovskiy	Russia	4 February 1994	Moscow	
19	5.64	Bruny Surin	Canada	27 January 1995	Moscow	
19	5.64+	Donovan Powell	Jamaica	21 February 1999	Liévin	
19	5.64+	Leonard Myles-Mills	Ghana	13 February 2000	Liévin	
19	5.64+	Ato Boldon	Trinidad and Tobago	16 February 2000	Madrid	
19	5.64+	Tim Harden	United States	16 February 2000	Madrid	
19	5.64	Gerald Williams	United States	19 February 2000	Los Angeles	
19	5.64	Jeff Laynes	United States	20 January 2001	Los Angeles	
19	5.64	Asafa Powell	Jamaica	28 January 2012	New York City	

- ^{B} Ben Johnson of Canada ran 5.55 at Ottawa, Canada on 31 January 1987, but this time was rescinded after Johnson admitted to using steroids between 1981 and 1988.

==== Notes ====
Below is a list of other times equal or superior to 5.63:

- Maurice Greene also ran 5.59+ (1999).
- Michael Green also ran 5.62+ (1997).
- Donovan Bailey also ran 5.62 (1996).
- Deji Aliu also ran 5.63+ (1999).
- Freddy Mayola also ran 5.63+ (2001).

==== Outdoor best performances ====
+ = en route to 100m mark. N.B. The Seville marks listed are excluding the athlete's reaction times. Bolt's & Su's times are inclusive.

Rank	Time	Wind (m/s)	Athlete	Nation	Date	Place	Ref.
1	5.40+ (calculated; add 0.127, or 0.13)	+0.2	Bruny Surin	Canada	22 August 1999	Seville	
2	5.42+ (calculated; add 0.132, or 0.14)	+0.2	Maurice Greene	United States	22 August 1999	Seville	
3	5.43+ (calculated; add 0.140)	+0.2	Dwain Chambers	Great Britain	22 August 1999	Seville	
4	5.45+	+0.9	Su Bingtian	China	1 August 2021	Tokyo	
5	5.46+ (calculated; add 0.136, or 0.14)	+0.2	Tim Harden	United States	22 August 1999	Seville	
6	5.47+ (calculated)	+0.9	Usain Bolt	Jamaica	16 August 2009	Berlin	

=== Women ===
- Correct as of February 2026.

Rank	Time	Athlete	Nation	Date	Place	Ref.
1	5.96+	Irina Privalova	Russia	9 February 1995	Madrid	
2	6.00	Merlene Ottey	Jamaica	4 February 1994	Moscow	
3	6.02+	Gail Devers	United States	21 February 1999	Liévin	
4	6.04+	Chioma Ajunwa	Nigeria	22 February 1998	Liévin	
5	6.05+	Savatheda Fynes	Bahamas	13 February 2000	Liévin	
5	6.05+	Philomena Mensah	Canada	13 February 2000	Liévin	
7	6.07 A	Gwen Torrence	United States	9 February 1996	Reno	
8	6.08+	Christy Opara-Thompson	Nigeria	16 February 1997	Liévin	
8	6.08	Veronica Campbell-Brown	Jamaica	28 January 2012	New York City	
10	6.09	Zhanna Block	Ukraine	2 February 1993	Moscow	
10	6.09+	Zaynab Dosso	Italy	3 February 2026	Ostrava	
12	6.11	Marita Koch	East Germany	2 February 1980	Grenoble	
12	6.11+	Liliana Allen	Mexico	13 February 2000	Liévin	
12	6.11+	Christine Arron	France	26 February 2006	Aubière	
15	6.12	Marlies Göhr	East Germany	2 February 1980	Grenoble	
15	6.12	Silke Möller	East Germany	19 February 1988	Berlin	
15	6.12	Anelia Nuneva	Bulgaria	27 January 1995	Moscow	
15	6.12+	Ewa Swoboda	Poland	4 February 2025	Ostrava	
15	6.12+	Patrizia van der Weken	Luxembourg	4 February 2025	Ostrava	
20	6.13	Jeanette Bolden	United States	21 February 1981	Edmonton	
20	6.13	Michelle Finn-Burrell	United States	15 February 1992	Los Angeles	
20	6.13	Natalya Merzlyakova	Russia	4 February 1994	Moscow	
20	6.13	Ekaterina Grigorieva	Russia	4 February 1994	Moscow	
20	6.13+	Mercy Nku	Nigeria	25 February 2001	Liévin	
25	6.14+	Frédérique Bangué	France	16 February 1997	Liévin	
25	6.14+	Petya Pendareva	Bulgaria	21 February 1999	Liévin	
25	6.14+	Muriel Hurtis	France	23 February 2003	Liévin	
25	6.14+	LaVerne Jones-Ferrette	United States Virgin Islands	24 February 2012	Liévin	

Note: Angella Issajenko of Canada ran a world record 6.06 in Ottawa on 13 January 1987, this performance was rescinded after Issajenko's admittance of long term drug use at the Dubin Inquiry in 1989.

==== Notes ====
Below is a list of other times equal or superior to 6.11:

- Irina Privalova also ran 6.01 (1994), 6.03 (1994), 6.04 (1993), 6.05+ (1993, 1997), 6.07 (1994), 6.08 (1994), 6.08+ (1997), 6.09 (1994) and 6.11+ (1996).
- Gail Devers also ran 6.03 (1999) and 6.10 (1993).
- Merlene Ottey also ran 6.06+ (1999), 6.08+ (1999) and 6.11+ (1996).
- Savatheda Fynes also ran 6.07+ (1999).
- Philomena Mensah also ran 6.07+ (1999).
- Christy Opara-Thompson also ran 6.11+ (1997).

==== Outdoor best performances ====
+ = en route to 100m mark

Time	Wind (m/s)	Athlete	Nation	Date	Place	Ref.
5.93+ (calculated)	−0.1	Marion Jones	United States	22 August 1999	Seville	

== World leading times ==
=== Men ===
Year	Mark	Athlete	Place
1968	5.70	Jobst Hirscht (FRG)	Madrid
1971	5.79	Jobst Hirscht (FRG)	Kiel
1972	5.75	Valeriy Borzov (USSR)	Grenoble
1973	5.61	Manfred Kokot (GDR)	Berlin
1974	5.68	Wolfgang Lobe (GDR)	Berlin
1976	5.75	Eugen Ray (GDR)	Berlin
1977	5.74	Klaus-Dieter Kurrat (GDR)	Berlin
1978	5.77	Aleksandr Aksinin (USSR)	Berlin
1979	5.76	Houston McTear (USA)	Daly City
1980	5.72	Ray James (USA)	Syracuse
1981	5.61	James Sanford (USA)	San Diego
1982	5.76	Emmit King (USA)	Sherbrooke
1983	5.72	Stanley Floyd (USA)	Chicago
1984	5.69	Ron Brown (USA)	San Diego
1985	5.73	František Ptacnik (TCH)	Prague
1985	5.73	Albert Lawrence (JAM)	Kobe
1986	5.62	Emmit King (USA)	Kobe
1987	5.76	František Ptacnik (TCH)	Prague
1988	5.72	Sven Matthes (GDR)	Berlin
1989	5.68	Lee McRae (USA)	Hamilton
1990	5.73	Mike Marsh (USA)	Los Angeles
1991	5.69	Andre Cason (USA)	Los Angeles
1992	5.62	Andre Cason (USA)	Los Angeles
1992	5.62+	Eric Nkansah (GHA)	Liévin
1993	5.67	Bruny Surin (CAN)	Hamilton
1994	5.64	Aleksandr Porkhomovskiy (RUS)	Moscow
1995	5.63 A	Henry Neal (USA)	Reno
1996	5.56 A	Donovan Bailey (CAN)	Reno
1997	5.61+	Michael Green (JAM)	Liévin
1998	5.65	Stéphane Cali (FRA)	Eaubonne
1999	5.56	Maurice Greene (USA)	Los Angeles
2000	5.61+	Jason Gardener (GBR)	Madrid
2000	5.61+	Freddy Mayola (CUB)	Madrid
2001	5.63+	Freddy Mayola (CUB)	Madrid
2002	5.62+	Morne Nagel (RSA)	Liévin
2002	5.62+	Morne Nagel (RSA)	Liévin
2003	5.65+	Deji Aliu (NGR)	Liévin
2004	5.68+	Freddy Mayola (CUB)	Liévin
2005	5.58+	Leonard Scott (USA)	Liévin
2006	5.68+	Freddy Mayola (CUB)	Liévin
2006	5.68+	Freddy Mayola (CUB)	Liévin
2007	5.73+	Ronald Pognon (FRA)	Aubière
2008	5.76	Nicolas Macrozonaris (CAN)	Saskatoon
2009	5.70+	Abidemi Omole (USA)	Liévin
2010	5.71	Sam Effah (CAN)	Saskatoon
2010	5.71+	Lerone Clarke (JAM)	Liévin
2010	5.71+	Christophe Lemaitre (FRA)	Liévin
2010	5.71+	Harry Aikines-Aryeetey (GBR)	Liévin
2011	5.67	Sam Effah (CAN)	Saskatoon
2012	5.63+	Lerone Clarke (JAM)	Liévin
2013	5.79	Cordero Gray (USA)	Saskatoon
2014	5.72	Marcus Rowland (USA)	Saskatoon
2015	5.83	Woodrow Randall (USA)	Saskatoon
2016			
2017	5.76	Eric Cray (PHI)	Saskatoon
2018	5.67	Blake Smith (USA)	Saskatoon
2019	5.77	Sean McLean (USA)	Saskatoon
2020	5.73	Umut Uysal (TUR)	Istanbul
2026	5.73	Usheoritse Itsekiri (NGA)	Saskatoon

=== Women ===
Year	Mark	Athlete	Place
1968	6.24	Sylviane Telliez (FRA)	Madrid
1972	6.25	Renate Stecher (GDR)	Grenoble
1974	6.19	Renate Stecher (GDR)	Berlin
1976	6.30	Christina Brehmer (GDR)	Berlin
1978	6.28	Marita Koch (GDR)	Berlin
1978	6.28	Annie Alize (FRA)	Grenoble
1979	6.28	Annegret Richter (FRG)	Berlin
1980	6.11	Marita Koch (GDR)	Grenoble
1981	6.13	Jeanette Bolden (USA)	Edmonton
1982	6.20	Evelyn Ashford (USA)	Daly City
1983	6.16	Evelyn Ashford (USA)	Chicago
1984	6.16	Angela Bailey (CAN)	Toronto
1985	6.21	Els Vader (NED)	Zwolle
1985	6.21	Marita Koch (GDR)	Kobe
1986	6.13	Silke Möller (GDR)	Berlin
1987	6.13	Marlies Göhr (GDR)	Berlin
1988	6.12	Silke Möller (GDR)	Berlin
1989	6.18	Kerstin Behrendt (GDR)	Berlin
1990	6.34	Angela Bailey (CAN)	Los Angeles
1990	6.34	Sheila Echols (USA)	Cleveland
1991	6.15	Katrin Krabbe (GDR)	Berlin
1992	6.13	Michelle Finn-Burrell (USA)	Los Angeles
1993	6.09	Zhanna Block (UKR)	Moscow
1994	6.00	Merlene Ottey (JAM)	Moscow
1995	5.96+	Irina Privalova (RUS)	Madrid
1996	6.07 A	Gwen Torrence (USA)	Reno
1997	6.08+	Christy Opara-Thompson (NGR)	Liévin
1998	6.04+	Chioma Ajunwa (NGR)	Liévin
1999	6.02+	Gail Devers (USA)	Liévin
2000	6.05+	Savatheda Fynes (BAH)	Liévin
2000	6.05+	Philomena Mensah (CAN)	Liévin
2001	6.12+	Savatheda Fynes (BAH)	Madrid
2002	6.17	Angela Williams (USA)	Los Angeles
2003	6.14+	Muriel Hurtis (FRA)	Liévin
2004	6.12+	Christine Arron (FRA)	Aubière
2005	6.15+	Christine Arron (FRA)	Liévin
2006	6.11+	Christine Arron (FRA)	Aubière
2007	6.28+	Victoria Jordan (USA)	Landover
2008	6.23+	Christine Arron (FRA)	Bordeaux
2009	6.26+	Chandra Sturrup (BAH)	Liévin
2010	6.21+	Sheri-Ann Brooks (JAM)	Liévin
2011	6.27	Yuliya Balykina (BLR)	Minsk
2012	6.08	Veronica Campbell-Brown (JAM)	New York City
2013	6.30	Brittney Reese (USA)	Saskatoon
2014	6.34	Crystal Emmanuel (CAN)	Saskatoon
2015	6.34	Crystal Emmanuel (CAN)	Saskatoon
2016			
2017	6.30	Erica Alexander (USA)	Saskatoon
2018	6.30	Crystal Emmanuel (CAN)	Saskatoon
2019	6.35	Tawanna Meadows (USA)	Saskatoon
2026	6.09	Zaynab Dosso (ITA)	Ostrava
