= Sanna Kyllönen =

Finnish sprinter (born 1971)

Sanna Kyllönen, née Hernesniemi (born 9 March 1971 in Kokkola) is a retired Finnish woman sprinter, who specialized in the 100 and 200 metres.

== International competitions ==
Year	Competition	Venue	Position	Event	Notes
Representing Finland
1988	World Junior Championships	Sudbury, Canada	22nd (sf)	100 m	12.14 (-0.7 m/s)
1988	World Junior Championships	Sudbury, Canada	31st (h)	200 m	24.53 (+1.6 m/s)
1988	World Junior Championships	Sudbury, Canada	12th (h)	4 × 100 m relay	46.12
1989	European Junior Championships	Varaždin, Yugoslavia	13th (sf)	100 m	11.94
1989	European Junior Championships	Varaždin, Yugoslavia	20th (h)	200 m	24.64
1990	World Junior Championships	Plovdiv, Bulgaria	19th (sf)	100 m	11.96 (-1.3 m/s)
1990	World Junior Championships	Plovdiv, Bulgaria	10th (sf)	200 m	24.02 (-0.9 m/s)
1990	European Championships	Split, Yugoslavia	19th (h)	100 m	11.86
1990	European Championships	Split, Yugoslavia	–	4 × 100 m relay	DQ
1991	World Championships	Tokyo, Japan	10th (h)	4 × 100 m relay	43.73
1992	European Indoor Championships	Genoa, Italy	6th	60 m	7.39
1992	European Indoor Championships	Genoa, Italy	6th	200 m	23.97
1992	Olympic Games	Barcelona, Spain	9th (h)	4 × 100 m relay	43.60
1993	World Indoor Championships	Toronto, Canada	8th (sf)	60 m	7.31
1993	World Indoor Championships	Toronto, Canada	4th	200 m	23.03
1993	World Championships	Stuttgart, Germany	20th (qf)	100 m	11.40
1993	World Championships	Stuttgart, Germany	18th (qf)	200 m	23.24
1993	World Championships	Stuttgart, Germany	7th	4 × 100 m relay	43.37
1994	European Indoor Championships	Paris, France	11th (h)	60 m	7.38
1994	European Championships	Helsinki, Finland	7th	100 m	11.43 (+0.6 m/s)
1994	European Championships	Helsinki, Finland	6th	200 m	23.24 (+0.2 m/s)
1994	European Championships	Helsinki, Finland	7th	4 × 100 m relay	43.96
1995	World Indoor Championships	Barcelona, Spain	13th (sf)	60 m	7.31
1995	World Indoor Championships	Barcelona, Spain	–	200 m	DNF
1995	World Championships	Gothenburg, Sweden	16th (sf)	100 m	11.51
1995	World Championships	Gothenburg, Sweden	24th (h)	200 m	23.20
1995	World Championships	Gothenburg, Sweden	6th	4 × 100 m relay	44.46
1996	Olympic Games	Atlanta, United States	24th (qf)	100 m	11.49
1996	Olympic Games	Atlanta, United States	16th (qf)	200 m	23.38
1996	Olympic Games	Atlanta, United States	11th (h)	4 × 100 m relay	44.21
1997	World Indoor Championships	Paris, France	15th (sf)	60 m	7.39
1997	World Championships	Athens, Greece	21st (qf)	100 m	11.37
1997	World Championships	Athens, Greece	29th (qf)	200 m	23.52
1997	World Championships	Athens, Greece	13th (h)	4 × 100 m relay	44.08
1998	European Championships	Budapest, Hungary	13th (sf)	100 m	11.45
1998	European Championships	Budapest, Hungary	22nd (h)	200 m	23.70
1998	European Championships	Budapest, Hungary	6th	4 × 100 m relay	44.10
1999	World Championships	Seville, Spain	34th (h)	200 m	23.43
1999	World Championships	Seville, Spain	10th (h)	4 × 100 m relay	43.86
2000	European Indoor Championships	Ghent, Belgium	14th (sf)	60 m	7.34
2000	Olympic Games	Stuttgart, Germany	12th (sf)	4 × 100 m relay	43.50
