= Sara Wüest =

Swiss sprinter

Personal information
- Born: 4 August 1969 (age 56)

Sport
- Sport: Athletics
- Event(s): 100 m, 200 m

Sara Wüest (born 4 August 1969) is a Swiss athlete who competed in sprinting events. She represented her country at two World Indoor Championships, in 1993 and 1995.

== International competitions ==
Year	Competition	Venue	Position	Event	Notes
Representing Switzerland
1988	World Junior Championships	Sudbury, Canada	9th (h)	4 × 100 m relay	45.20
1990	European Indoor Championships	Glasgow, United Kingdom	17th (h)	60 m	7.49
1992	European Indoor Championships	Genoa, Italy	10th (sf)	60 m	7.38
1993	World Indoor Championships	Toronto, Canada	18th (h)	60 m	7.44
1994	European Championships	Helsinki, Finland	22nd (qf)	100 m	11.70
1994	European Championships	Helsinki, Finland	20th (h)	200 m	23.89
1994	European Championships	Helsinki, Finland	9th (h)	4 × 100 m relay	44.43
1995	World Indoor Championships	Barcelona, Spain	28th (h)	60 m	7.45

== Personal bests ==
Outdoor

- 100 metres – 11.62 (+0.1 m/s, Zofingen 1996)
- 200 metres – 23.85 (-0.6 m/s, Zürich 1992)

Indoor

- 60 metres – 7.37 (Genoa 1992)
