= N'Deye Binta Dia =

Senegalese sprinter (born 1973)

Personal information
- Born: 8 April 1973 (age 53)
- Height: 1.60 m (5 ft 3 in)
- Weight: 55 kg (121 lb)

Sport
- Sport: Track and field
- Events: 60 m, 100 m, 200 m

N'Dèye Binta Dia (born 8 April 1973) is a retired Senegalese athlete who specialised in sprinting events. She represented her country at the 1992 Summer Olympics as well as one outdoor and three indoor World Championships.

== Competition record ==
Year	Competition	Venue	Position	Event	Notes
Representing Senegal
1991	World Indoor Championships	Seville, Spain	19th (h)	60 m	7.44
1992	Olympic Games	Barcelona, Spain	37th (h)	100 m	11.83
1992	World Junior Championships	Seoul, South Korea	8th (sf)	100 m	11.75
1993	World Indoor Championships	Toronto, Canada	19th (h)	60 m	7.46
1993	World Championships	Stuttgart, Germany	27th (qf)	100 m	11.60
1994	Jeux de la Francophonie	Bondoufle, France	4th	100 m	11.83
1995	World Indoor Championships	Barcelona, Spain	28th (h)	60 m	7.45
1995	Universiade	Fukuoka, Japan	14th (sf)	100 m	11.81

== Personal bests ==
Outdoor

- 100 metres – 11.55 (+1.0 m/s, Geneva 1996)

Indoor

- 60 metres – 7.37 (Liévin 1996) NR
- 200 metres – 24.09 (Liévin 1996)
