= 1991 European Athletics Junior Championships =

- Level: Under 20
- Events: 42

The 1991 European Athletics Junior Championships was the eleventh edition of the biennial athletics competition for European athletes aged under twenty. It was held in Thessaloniki, Greece between 8 and 11 August.

== Men's results ==
Event	Gold		Silver		Bronze	
100 m	Darren Campbell (GBR)	10.46	Konstantin Gromadskiy (URS)	10.55	Alessandro Orlandi (ITA)	10.55
200 m	Darren Campbell (GBR)	20.61	Oganes Mkrtchyan (URS)	21.00	Gerald Aust (GER)	21.12
400 m	David Grindley (GBR)	45.41	Mark Richardson (GBR)	45.53	Florian Hennig (GER)	46.42
800 m	Curtis Robb (GBR)	1:48.23	Aleksey Oleynikov (URS)	1:48.63	Vaclav Hrich (TCH)	1:49.19
1500 m	Mateo Cañellas (ESP)	3:53.11	Andrey Bulkovskiy (URS)	3:53.61	Claus Wittekindt (GER)	3:53.66
5000 m	Marc Carroll (IRL)	14:19.48	Cyrille Ballester (FRA)	14:21.33	Juan Luis Gomez (ESP)	14:21.77
10,000 m	Danilo Goffi (ITA)	30:18.62	Yuriy Chizhkov (URS)	30:21.97	Antonio Roman (ESP)	30:54.55
3000 m s'chase	Georgios Loukaides (CYP)	8:49.24	Steffen Brandis (GER)	8:50.01	Jim Svenøy (NOR)	8:50.02
110 m hurdles	Sven Gohler (GER)	13.95	Yevgeniy Pechenkin (URS)	14.06	Claude Edorh (GER)	14.26
400 m hurdles	Aleksandr Belikov (URS)	50.29	Ashraf Saber (ITA)	51.21	Daniel Blochwitz (GER)	51.25
10,000 m walk	Ilya Markov (URS)	41:11.22	Grzegorz Muller (POL)	41:13.00	Michele Didoni (ITA)	42:16.68
20 km run	Juan Franc Sanchez (ESP)	1:06:19	Marco Orsi (ITA)	1:06:45	Vladimir Radiletskiy (URS)	1:06:53
4 × 100 m relay	Soviet Union (URS); Alex Porkhomovskiy; Serhiy Osovych; Vitaliy Semyonov; Konstantin Gromadskiy	39.79	Great Britain (GBR); David Jackson; Mark Richardson; Jamie Baulch; Darren Campbell	39.86	France (FRA); Willy Seymour; Sébastien Carrat; Sébastien Sayé; Stéphane Cali	40.03
4 × 400 m relay	Great Britain (GBR); Kent Ulyatt; Adrian Patrick; Mark Richardson; David Grindley	3:07.22	Poland (POL); Dariusz Zielenkiewicz; Tomasz Czubak; Artur Gąsiewski; Paweł Januszewski	3:08.18	Soviet Union (URS); Vitaliy Sviridenko; Andrey Inozemtsev; Inguns Sviklins; Aleksandr Belikov	3:10.34
High jump	Steve Smith (GBR)	2.29 m	Sergey Klyugin (URS)	2.27 m	Petar Malešev (YUG)	2.25 m
Pole vault	Gerald Baudouin (FRA)	5.50 m	Aleksandr Korchagin (URS)	5.30 m	Tim Lobinger (GER)	5.20 m
Long jump	Steve Phillips (GBR)	7.91 m	Matias Ghansah (SWE)	7.82 m	Georg Ackermann (GER)	7.74 m
Triple jump	Tosi Fasinro (GBR)	16.68 m	Karsten Richter (GER)	16.34 m	Yaroslav Ivanov (BUL)	16.34 m
Shot put	Aleksey Shidlovskiy (URS)	18.40 m	Aleksey Shapran (URS)	17.61 m	Ralf Kahles (GER)	17.12 m
Discus throw	Vladimir Dubrovshchik (URS)	60.58 m	Johannes Kerala (FIN)	54.86 m	Gennadiy Barsegyan (URS)	53.50 m
Hammer throw	Ruslan Dikiy (URS)	70.06 m	Marcel Kunkel (GER)	68.94 m	Balázs Kiss (HUN)	68.40 m
Javelin throw	Aleksey Shchepin (URS)	75.20 m	Jarkko Heimonen (FIN)	75.00 m	Aki Parviainen (FIN)	74.70 m
Decathlon	Vitaliy Kolpakov (URS)	7813 pts	Tomáš Dvořák (TCH)	7748 pts	Jarkko Finni (FIN)	7479 pts

== Women's results ==
Event	Gold		Silver		Bronze	
100 m	Zhanna Tarnopolskaya (URS)	11.35	Marcia Richardson (GBR)	11.62	Bettina Zipp (GER)	11.64
200 m	Zhanna Tarnopolskaya (URS)	23.56	Giada Gallina (ITA)	23.83	Katharine Merry (GBR)	23.84
400 m	Donna Fraser (GBR)	52.54	Anja Rucker (GER)	52.73	Wiebke Steffen (GER)	53.42
800 m	Aurica Rautu (ROM)	2:04.18	Fabia Trabaldo (ITA)	2:04.75	Severine Foulon (FRA)	2:05.07
1500 m	Malin Ewerlof (SWE)	4:15.43	Fabia Trabaldo (ITA)	4:15.58	Olga Yegorova (URS)	4:17.09
3000 m	Gabriela Szabo (ROM)	9:19.28	Gunhild Halle (NOR)	9:22.48	Milka Mikhailova (BUL)	9:23.56
10,000 m	Dorte Koster (GER)	35:10.30	Inna Kozina (URS)	35:23.68	Ana Nanu (ROM)	35:24.24
100 m hurdles	Keri Maddox (GBR)	13.39	Petra Huybrechtse (NED)	13.44	Samantha Baker (GBR)	13.61
400 m hurdles	Nelli Voronkova (URS)	56.89	Christina Sonderegger (SUI)	58.06	Åsa Carlsson (SWE)	58.23
5000 m walk	Yuliya Korolyova (URS)	21:57.60	Susana Feitor (POR)	22:00.98	Natalya Trofimova (URS)	22:11.52
4 × 100 m relay	Germany (GER); Katharina Gaus; Gabi Rockmeier; Birgit Rockmeier; Silke Lichtenhagen	44.46	Great Britain (GBR); Lisa Armstrong; Marcia Richardson; Donna Fraser; Katharine Merry	44.57	Italy (ITA); Elena Barangani; Nadia Guarino; Giancarla Marinelli; Giada Gallina	45.01
4 × 400 m relay	Germany (GER); Andrea Bornscheuer; Silvia Steimle; Wiebke Steffen; Anja Rücker	3:35.24	Soviet Union (URS); Anna Kozak; Natalya Sharova; Zhanna Tarnopolskaya; Nelli Voronkova	3:37.30	Romania (ROM); Georgeta Petrea; Laura Itcu; Mariana Florea; Maria Magdalena Nedelcu	3:38.45
High jump	Manuela Aigner (GER)	1.91 m	Venelina Veneva (BUL)	1.91 m	Viktoriya Fyodorova (URS)	1.91 m
Long jump	Oluyinka Idowu (GBR)	6.60 m	Lyudmila Galkina (URS)	6.54 m	Iva Prandzheva (BUL)	6.50 m
Triple jump	Lyudmila Galkina (URS)	13.67 m	Tatyana Matyashova (URS)	13.49 m	Elena Dumitrascu (ROM)	13.31 m
Shot put	Anja Gündler (GER)	16.80 m	Ilona Gersdorff (GER)	16.09 m	Olga Iliyna (URS)	16.06 m
Discus throw	Anja Gündler (GER)	60.38 m	Natalya Koptyukh (URS)	56.44 m	Olena Antonova (URS)	54.30 m
Javelin throw	Christine Gast (GER)	56.30 m	Nikola Tomečková (TCH)	55.34 m	Steffi Nerius (GER)	54.60 m
Heptathlon	Natallia Sazanovich (URS)	5896 pts	Nathalie Teppe (FRA)	5868 pts	Astrid Retzke (GER)	5694 pts

== Medal table ==
Rank	Nation	Gold	Silver	Bronze	Total
1	Soviet Union (URS)	14	14	8	36
2	Great Britain (GBR)	11	4	2	17
3	Germany (GER)	8	5	12	25
4	Romania (ROM)	2	0	3	5
5	Spain (ESP)	2	0	2	4
6	Italy (ITA)	1	5	3	9
7	France (FRA)	1	2	2	5
8	Sweden (SWE)	1	1	1	3
9	Cyprus (CYP)	1	0	0	1
9	Ireland (IRL)	1	0	0	1
11	Finland (FIN)	0	2	2	4
12	Czechoslovakia (TCH)	0	2	1	3
13	Poland (POL)	0	2	0	2
14	Bulgaria (BUL)	0	1	3	4
15	Norway (NOR)	0	1	1	2
16	Netherlands (NED)	0	1	0	1
16	Portugal (POR)	0	1	0	1
16	Switzerland (SUI)	0	1	0	1
19	Hungary (HUN)	0	0	1	1
19	Yugoslavia (YUG)	0	0	1	1
Totals (20 entries)		42	42	42	126
