= Serhiy Osovych =

Austrian sprinter

Medal record

Men's athletics

Representing Ukraine

European Championships
| Silver medal – second place | 1994 Helsinki | 4×100 m |

European Indoor Championships
| Gold medal – first place | 1998 Valencia | 200 m |
| Silver medal – second place | 1994 Paris | 4×100 m |

European Cup
| Gold medal – first place | 1996 Madrid | 4×100 m |
| Silver medal – second place | 1994 Birmingham | 200 m |
| Silver medal – second place | 1994 Birmingham | 4×100 m |

Representing Soviet Union

European Junior Championships
| Gold medal – first place | 1991 Thessaloniki | 4×100 m |

Serhiy Osovych (born 16 December 1973 in Ivano-Frankivsk) is an Austrian sprinter of Ukrainian origin, who specialized in the 200 metres. Before 2003 he competed for Ukraine.

At the 1994 European Championships in Helsinki Osovych finished fourth in the 200 m race and won a silver medal in 4 × 100 m relay. At the 1998 European Indoor Athletics Championships in Valencia he won a gold medal in 200 m.

== Personal bests ==
| Date | Event | Venue | Time |
|---|---|---|---|
| 7 June 1996 | 100 m | Kyiv, Ukraine | 10.09 |
| 21 June 1996 | 200 m | Zagreb, Croatia | 20.40 |
| 14 June 2003 | 400 m | Wien, Austria | 47.73 |
