= Andriy Bulkovskyi =

Ukrainian Olympic middle-distance runner

Andriy Bulkovskyi Andrii Bulkovskyi
Personal information
- Nationality: Ukrainian
- Born: 22 July 1972 (age 53) Lviv, Ukrainian SSR, Soviet Union
- Height: 184 cm (6 ft 0 in)
- Weight: 64 kg (141 lb)

Sport
- Country: Ukraine
- Sport: Middle-distance running
Medal record
Men's athletics
Representing Ukraine
European Cup
Gold medal – first place	1993 Rome	800 m
Gold medal – first place	1993 Rome	1500 m
Gold medal – first place	1994 Birmingham	1500 m
Representing Soviet Union
European Athletics U20 Championships
Silver medal – second place	1991 Thessaloniki	1500 m

Andriy Bulkovskyi or Andrii Bulkovskyi (ukr. Андрій Булковський) is a Ukrainian Olympic middle-distance runner. He represented his country in the men's 1500 meters at the 1996 Summer Olympics. His time was a 3:53.30.
