= Natalya Anisimova (sprinter) =

Russian track and field athlete

Personal information
- Born: May 8, 1973 (age 53)

Sport
- Country: Russia
Medal record
Women's athletics
Representing Russia
European Championships
Silver medal – second place	1994 Helsinki	4×100 m relay
Summer Universiade
Silver medal – second place	1995 Fukuoka	4x100 m relay

Natalya Anisimova (Russian: Наталья Анисимова; born May 8, 1973) is a Russian track and field athlete who competed mainly in the 100 metres. She won the 4 × 100 metres relay silver medal for Russia at the 1994 European Athletics Championships with her teammates Marina Trandenkova, Galina Malchugina and Irina Privalova. In 1996 she also won the national indoor championship in 60 metres.

== Personal records ==
- 60 m (Indoor): 7.14 seconds, 23 February 1996, Moscow
- 100 m: 11.23 seconds, 2 July 1996, Saint-Petersburg

== National titles ==
- Russian Indoor Athletics Championships
  - 60 metres: 1996

== See also ==
- List of European Athletics Championships medalists (women)
