= Tatyana Zakharova =

Russian sprinter

Personal information
- Born: April 18, 1969 (age 57)
Medal record
Women's athletics
Representing Russia
World Championships
| Silver medal – second place | 1995 Gothenburg | 4×400 m |
European Championships
| Silver medal – second place | 1994 Helsinki | 4×400 m |

Tatyana Zakharova (Russian: Татьяна Захарова; born April 18, 1969) was a professional sprinter from Russia. She won a silver medal in the 4 × 400 m relay at the 1995 World Championships in Athletics by virtue of running for her team in the preliminary rounds.

She also won a silver medal in the 4 × 400 m at the 1994 Goodwill Games, this time running in the final.

== International competitions ==
| Year | Competition | Venue | Position | Event | Notes |
|---|---|---|---|---|---|
| 1994 | European Championships | Helsinki, Finland | 6th (semis) | 400 m | 52.99 |
| 1994 | European Championships | Helsinki, Finland | 2nd | 4 × 400 m | 3:24.06 |
