= Petra Huybrechtse =

Dutch sprinter

Personal information
- Born: 26 September 1972 (age 53) Amsterdam, the Netherlands
- Height: 1.72 m (5 ft 8 in)
- Weight: 64 kg (141 lb)

Sport
- Sport: Sprint
- Club: Nea Volharding, Purmerend
Medal record
Representing the Netherlands
European Athletics Junior Championships
| Silver medal – second place | 1991 Thessaloniki | 100 m hurdles |

Petronella Margaretha "Petra" Huybrechtse (born 26 September 1972) is a retired Dutch sprinter. She competed at the 1992 Summer Olympics in the 4×100 m relay, but her team failed to reach the final. The same year she won national titles in the 60 metres and 60 m hurdles events.

Huybrechtse has degrees in psychology from St. Ignatiuscollege of Purmerend, University of Amsterdam, and University of Leiden (2000). Between 1993 and 1994 she trained and studied in Gainesville, Florida, on a scholarship. She retired from competitions in early 1996 and worked as psychologist at Waterlandziekenhuis in Purmerend. After marriage she changed her last name to Willemse-Huybrechtse.
