= Jean-Louis Rapnouil =

French sprinter

Medal record

Men's athletics

Representing France

European Championships
Silver medal – second place	1994 Helsinki	4×400 m

Jean-Louis Rapnouil (born 24 January 1966 in Fort-de-France, Martinique) is a French athlete who specialises in the 400 meters. Rapnouil competed at the 1992 Summer Olympics and 1996 Summer Olympics.
