= Olga Bogoslovskaya =

Russian sprinter

Medal record

Women's Athletics

Olympic Games

Representing the Unified Team
Silver medal – second place	1992 Barcelona	4 × 100 m relay

World Championships

Representing Russia
Gold medal – first place	1993 Stuttgart	4 × 100 m relay

Olga Mikhaylvna Bogoslovskaya (Russian: Ольга Михайловна Богословская; born May 20, 1964) is a retired Russian athlete who competed mainly in the 100 metres. She currently works as a sports journalist.

== Career ==
Bogoslovskaya competed for the Unified Team at the age of 28 in the 1992 Summer Olympics held in Barcelona, Spain in the 4 × 100 metres with her teammates Galina Malchugina, Marina Trandenkova and Irina Privalova who had finished third in the 100 metres. Her team recorded a time of 42.16, and she received a silver medal–second only to the United States team of Evelyn Ashford, Esther Jones, Carlette Guidry, Gwen Torrence, and Michelle Finn, who recorded a time of 42.11. She works as an athletics correspondent for Match TV and was married to Dmitry Guberniev.

== Doping disqualification ==
In 1994, a doping test taken by Bogoslovskaya at the famous Cologne laboratory of Manfred Donike proved positive. The substance was obviously a steroid. After receiving a two-year disqualification and training for one more season, Bogoslovskaya decided to end her career.
