= Astrid Retzke =

German heptathlete

Personal information
- Nationality: German
- Born: 13 July 1973 (age 53) Wolfen, East Germany

Sport
- Sport: Athletics
- Event: Heptathlon

Astrid Retzke (born 13 July 1973) is a German athlete. She competed in the women's heptathlon at the 2000 Summer Olympics.
