= Odile Singa =

French sprinter

Personal information
- Nationality: France
- Born: 29 December 1967 (age 58) Saint-Denis, Réunion

Sport
- Events: 100m, 200m

Odile Singa (born 29 December 1967 at Saint-Denis at La Réunion) is a former French athlete, who specialised in the sprints.

== Biography ==
She won three Outdoor French Athletic Championships, 100 m in 1995, the 200 m in 1989 and 1994, and a 60 m indoor title in 1991.

During the 1990 European Championships, at Split in Yugoslavia, she had her personal best in the 200m where she ran 23.23s. She also took fourth in the final of the 4 × 100m relay.

In 1992, she finished second in the 4 × 100m relay at the World Cup of Nations at Havana, alongside Valérie Jean-Charles, Odiah Sidibe and Marie-Jose Perec.

At the 1995 World Championships in Athletics at Gothenburg, she took fifth in the 4 × 100m relay after setting a new French record in the heats of 42.56s.

=== Results ===
International Awards	Date	Competition	Location	Result	Event
1992	World Cup of Nations	Havana	2nd	4 × 100 m	

=== Records ===
personal records
Event	Performance	Location	Date
100 m	11.70s	Gothenburg	6 August 1995
200 m	23.23s	Split	30 August 1990
