= Bettina Zipp =

German sprinter

Medal record

Women's athletics

Representing Germany

European Championships
Gold medal – first place	1994 Helsinki	4×100 m

Bettina Zipp (born 29 April 1972, in Heidelberg) is a retired German sprinter.

Over 100 metres she won the bronze medal at the 1991 European Junior Championships. In the 4 × 100 metre relay she finished fifth at the 1993 World Championships and won the gold medal at the 1994 European Championships, the latter with teammates Melanie Paschke, Silke Knoll and Silke Lichtenhagen.

She competed for TV Schriesheim (1991–1995) and TV Wattenscheid 01 (1996–).
