= Anu Pirttimaa =

Finnish sprinter

Personal information
- Full name: Anu Marjo Pirttimaa
- Nationality: Finnish
- Born: 4 June 1972 (age 53) Ylivieska, Finland

Sport
- Sport: Sprinting
- Event: 4 × 100 metres relay

Anu Marjo Pirttimaa (born 4 June 1972) is a Finnish sprinter. She competed in the women's 4 × 100 metres relay at the 1996 Summer Olympics.
