= Giada Gallina =

Italian sprinter (born 1973)

Personal information
- Nationality: Italian
- Born: 1 December 1973 (age 52) Montebelluna, Italy
- Height: 1.64 m (5 ft 4 1/2 in)
- Weight: 54 kg (119 lb)

Sport
- Country: Italy
- Sport: Athletics
- Event: Sprint
- Club: Snam Milano

Achievements and titles
- Personal bests: 60 m: 7.64 (1997); 100 m: 11.23 (1997); 200 m: 23.29 (1994)
Medal record
European Junior Championships
Silver medal – second place	1991 Thessaloniki	200 m

Giada Gallina (born 1 December 1973 in Montebelluna) is an Italian former sprinter.

== Biography ==
In her career, she won the national championships 9 times.

== National titles ==
- 4 wins in 100 metres at the Italian Athletics Championships (1993, 1994, 1995, 1997)
- 3 wins in 200 metres at the Italian Athletics Championships (1993, 1994, 1995)
- 1 win in 60 metres at the Italian Athletics Indoor Championships (1997)
- 1 win in 200 metres at the Italian Athletics Indoor Championships (1994)

== See also ==
- Italian all-time lists - 100 metres
