= Michelle Finn-Burrell =

American sprinter

Personal information
- Full name: Michelle Bonae Finn-Burrell
- Nationality: American
- Born: Michelle Bonae Finn; May 8, 1965 (age 61) Orlando, Florida, U.S.

Sport
- Country: United States
- Sport: Track
- Event: Sprints
- College team: Florida State
- Club: Santa Monica Track Club
Medal record
Women's athletics
Representing the United States
Olympic Games
Gold medal – first place	1992 Barcelona	4 × 100 m relay
Pan American Games
Gold medal – first place	1987 Indianapolis	4 × 100 m relay
Summer Universiade
Gold medal – first place	1985 Kobe	4 x 100 m relay
Gold medal – first place	1989 Duisburg	4 x 100 m relay

Michelle Bonae Finn-Burrell (born May 8, 1965, in Orlando, Florida) is an American former sprint athlete from Orlando, Florida. She graduated from Oak Ridge High School in Orlando. She set the Florida State University record for the 100 meters which has lasted over 18 years into the 2006 season. She won a gold medal at the 1992 Barcelona Olympics as part of the 4 × 100 meters relay team (heats). She also reached the final of the 200 meters at the same event, finishing in seventh place. In 1993 Finn was a 100 and 200 m semi-finalist at the World Championships and took the bronze medal at the US national championships for the 200 m.

She ran on the United States gold medal-winning 4 × 100 m relay team in the 1986 Goodwill Games in Moscow. She spread her All-America performances over all four years of her FSU career beginning with the 100 meters as a freshman in 1984 through All-America honors in the 55, 100, 200 and with the 4 × 100 m relay team at the 1987 NCAA Championships. Finn was the 1990 TAC/USA's National Indoor Champion. She competed in the IAAF World Indoor Championships three times, reaching the final of the 60 meters twice.

She married Leroy Burrell, American sprinter, who broke the world 100 m record twice, 9.90s (1991) and 9.85s (1994). They have three sons Cameron, Joshua and Jaden.

== Personal bests ==
Event	Time (seconds)	Venue	Date
50 meters	6.13	Los Angeles, United States	February 15, 1992
60 meters	7.07	New York City, United States	February 28, 1992
100 meters	11.16	Lausanne, Switzerland	July 7, 1993
200 meters	23.24	Stuttgart, Germany	August 17, 1993
