= Marina Trandenkova =

Russian sprinter

Personal information
- Born: 7 January 1967 (age 59)

Sport
- Country: Russia
- Sport: Women's athletics

Achievements and titles
- Olympic finals: 1992 Barcelona
Medal record
Women's athletics
Representing the Unified Team
Olympic Games
Silver medal – second place	1992 Barcelona	4×100 m
Representing Russia
European Championships
Silver medal – second place	1994 Helsinki	4×100 m

Marina Evgenevna Trandenkova (Russian: Марина Евгеньевна Транденкова; born 7 January 1967) is a Russian athlete who competed mainly in the 100 metres sprint.

She competed for the Unified Team at the 1992 Summer Olympics held in Barcelona, Spain in the 4 × 100 metres where she won the silver medal with her teammates Olga Bogoslovskaya, Galina Malchugina and Irina Privalova. She was reprimanded in 1996 after testing positive for Bromantane. She is married to the former pole vaulter Igor Trandenkov.

== See also ==
- List of doping cases in athletics
