= Petya Pendareva =

Bulgarian sprinter (1971–2025)

Medal record

Women's athletics

Representing Bulgaria

European Championships
Bronze medal – third place	1994 Helsinki	4×100 m

Petya Pendareva (Bulgarian: Петя Москова Пендарева; 20 January 1971 – 7 January 2025) was a Bulgarian sprinter who specialised in the 100 metres.

Pendareva died on 7 January 2025, at the age of 53. It was announced that she would be buried in her native Kazanlak.

== Achievements ==
Year	Competition	Venue	Position	Event	Notes
Representing Bulgaria
1990	World Junior Championships	Plovdiv, Bulgaria	21st (sf)	100m	12.04 (wind: +1.1 m/s)
1990	World Junior Championships	Plovdiv, Bulgaria	6th	4 × 100 m relay	45.64
1994	European Championships	Helsinki, Finland	6th	100m	11.41 (wind: +0.6 m/s)
1994	European Championships	Helsinki, Finland	3rd	4 × 100 m relay	43.00
1998	European Championships	Budapest, Hungary	6th	100 m	11.12
1999	World Indoor Championships	Maebashi, Japan	6th	60 m	7.12
2000	European Indoor Championships	Ghent, Belgium	2nd	60 m	7.11
2001	World Indoor Championships	Lisbon, Portugal	6th	60 m	7.16

=== Personal bests ===
- 100 metres – 11.12 s (1998)
- 200 metres – 22.78 s (1993)
