= 1994 European Athletics Championships =

16th European Athletics Championships
- The logo of the 1994 European Athletics Championships
- Dates: 7–14 August
- Host city: Helsinki, Finland
- Venue: Helsinki Olympic Stadium
- Level: Senior
- Type: Outdoor
- Events: 44
- Participation: 1113 athletes from 44 nations

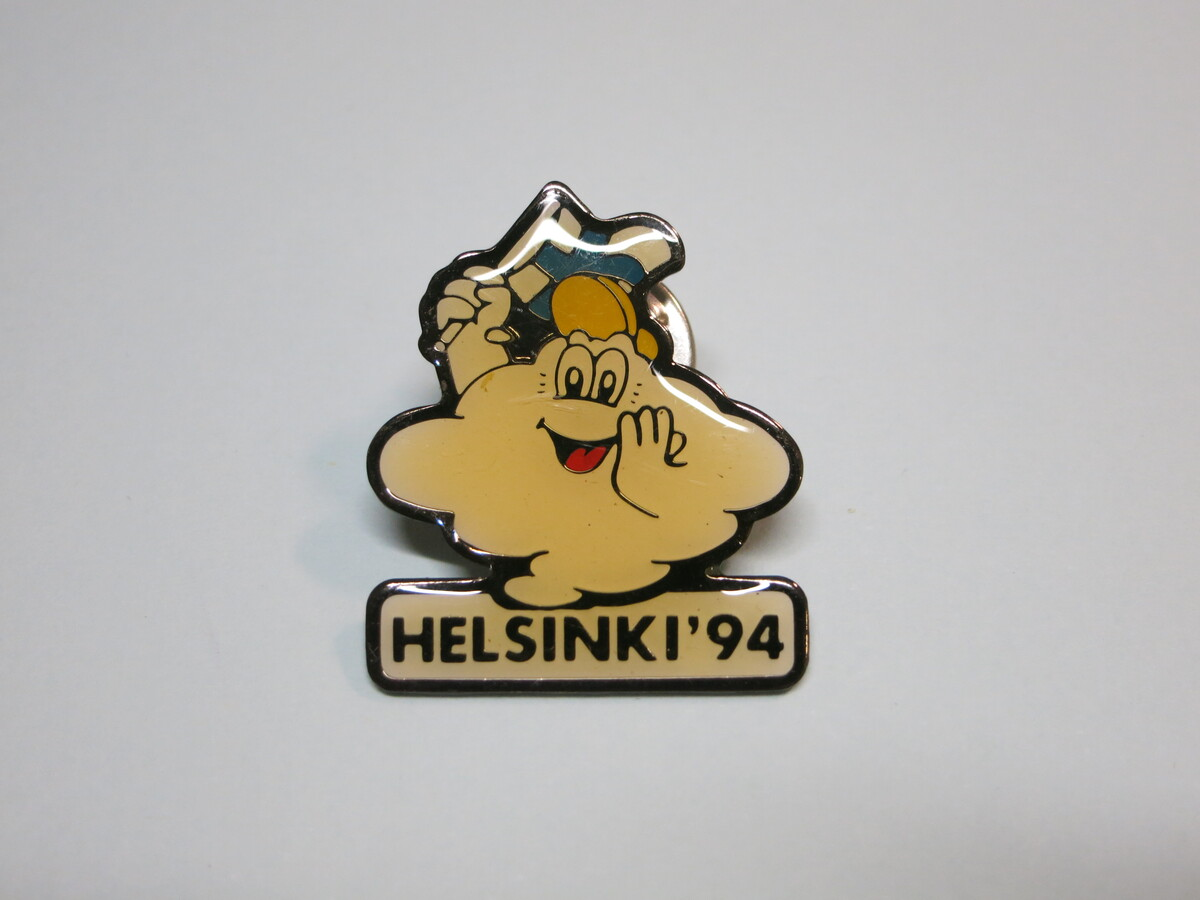
Mascot of the European Championships

The 16th European Athletics Championships were held from 7 August to 14 August 1994 in the Olympic Stadium of Helsinki, Finland.

== Men's results ==
Complete results were published.

=== Track ===
1986 |1990 |1994 |1998 |2002 |

Event	Gold		Silver		Bronze	
100 m	Linford Christie; Great Britain	10.14	Geir Moen; Norway	10.20	Aleksandr Porkhomovskiy; Russia	10.31
200 m	Geir Moen; Norway	20.30	Vladyslav Dolohodin; Ukraine	20.47	Patrick Stevens; Belgium	20.68
400 m	Du'aine Ladejo; Great Britain	45.09	Roger Black; Great Britain	45.20	Matthias Rusterholz; Switzerland	45.96
800 m	Andrea Benvenuti; Italy	1:46.12	Vebjørn Rodal; Norway	1:46.53	Tomás de Teresa; Spain	1:46.56
1500 m	Fermín Cacho; Spain	3:35.27	Isaac Viciosa; Spain	3:36.01	Branko Zorko; Croatia	3:36.88
5000 m	Dieter Baumann; Germany	13:36.93	Robert Denmark; Great Britain	13:37.50	Abel Antón; Spain	13:38.04
10,000 m	Abel Antón; Spain	28:06.03	Vincent Rousseau; Belgium	28:06.63	Stéphane Franke; Germany	28:07.95
Marathon	Martín Fiz; Spain	2:10:31	Diego Garcia; Spain	2:10:46	Alberto Juzdado; Spain	2:11:18
110 metres hurdles	Colin Jackson; Great Britain	13.08	Florian Schwarthoff; Germany	13.16	Tony Jarrett; Great Britain	13.23
400 metres hurdles	Oleg Tverdokhleb; Ukraine	48.06	Sven Nylander; Sweden	48.22	Stéphane Diagana; France	48.23
3000 metres steeplechase	Alessandro Lambruschini; Italy	8:28.68	Angelo Carosi; Italy	8:29.81	William Van Dijck; Belgium	8:30.93
20 kilometres walk	Mikhail Shchennikov; Russia	1:18:45	Yevgeniy Misyulya; Belarus	1:19:22	Valentí Massana; Spain	1:20:33
50 kilometres walk	Valeriy Spitsyn; Russia	3:41:07	Thierry Toutain; France	3:43:52	Giovanni Perricelli; Italy	3:43:55
4 × 100 metres relay	Hermann Lomba; Éric Perrot; Jean-Charles Trouabal; Daniel Sangouma; France	38.57	Serhiy Osovych; Oleh Kramarenko; Dmytro Vanyayikin; Vladyslav Dolohodin; Ukraine	38.98	Ezio Madonia; Domenico Nettis; Giorgio Marras; Sandro Floris; Italy	38.99
4 × 400 metres relay	David McKenzie; Roger Black; Brian Whittle; Du'aine Ladejo; Great Britain	2:59.13	Pierre-Marie Hilaire; Jacques Farraudiére; Jean-Louis Rapnouil; Stéphane Diagana; France	3:01.11	Mikhail Vdovin; Dmitriy Bey; Dmitriy Kosov; Dmitriy Golovastov; Russia	3:03.10
WR world record | AR area record | CR championship record | GR games record | NR national record | OR Olympic record | PB personal best | SB season best | WL world leading (in a given season)

=== Field ===
1986 |1990 |1994 |1998 |2002 |

Event	Gold		Silver		Bronze	
High jump	Steinar Hoen; Norway	2.35	Artur Partyka; Poland; Steve Smith; Great Britain	2.33		
Long jump	Ivaylo Mladenov; Bulgaria	8.09	Milan Gombala; Czech Republic	8.04	Konstantinos Koukodimos; Greece	8.01
Pole vault	Radion Gataullin; Russia	6.00	Igor Trandenkov; Russia	5.90	Jean Galfione; France	5.85
Triple jump	Denis Kapustin; Russia	17.62	Serge Hélan; France	17.55	Māris Bružiks; Latvia	17.20
Shot put	Aleksandr Klimenko; Ukraine	20.78	Oleksandr Bagach; Ukraine	20.34	Roman Virastyuk; Ukraine	19.59
Discus throw	Vladimir Dubrovshchik; Belarus	64.78	Dmitriy Shevchenko; Russia	64.56	Jürgen Schult; Germany	64.18
Javelin throw	Steve Backley; Great Britain	85.20	Seppo Räty; Finland	82.90	Jan Železný; Czech Republic	82.58
Hammer throw	Vasiliy Sidorenko; Russia	81.10	Igor Astapkovich; Belarus	80.40	Heinz Weis; Germany	78.48
Decathlon	Alain Blondel; France	8453	Henrik Dagård; Sweden	8362	Lev Lobodin; Ukraine	8201
WR world record | AR area record | CR championship record | GR games record | NR national record | OR Olympic record | PB personal best | SB season best | WL world leading (in a given season)

== Women's results ==
=== Track ===
1986 |1990 |1994 |1998 |2002 |

Event	Gold		Silver		Bronze	
100 metres	Irina Privalova; Russia	11.02	Zhanna Pintusevich; Ukraine	11.10	Melanie Paschke; Germany	11.28
200 metres	Irina Privalova; Russia	22.32	Zhanna Pintusevich; Ukraine	22.77	Galina Malchugina; Russia	22.90
400 metres	Marie-José Pérec; France	50.33	Svetlana Goncharenko; Russia	51.24	Phylis Smith; Great Britain	51.30
800 metres	Lyubov Gurina; Russia	1:58.55	Natalya Dukhnova; Belarus	1:58.55	Lyudmila Rogachova; Russia	1:58.69
1500 metres	Lyudmila Rogachova; Russia	4:18.93	Kelly Holmes; Great Britain	4:19.30	Yekaterina Podkopayeva; Russia	4:19.37
3000 metres	Sonia O'Sullivan; Ireland	8:31.84	Yvonne Murray; Great Britain	8:36.48	Gabriela Szabo; Romania	8:40.08
10,000 metres	Fernanda Ribeiro; Portugal	31:08.75	Conceição Ferreira; Portugal	31:32.82	Daria Nauer; Switzerland	31:35.96
Marathon	Manuela Machado; Portugal	2:29:54	Maria Curatolo; Italy	2:30:33	Adriana Barbu; Romania	2:30:55
100 metres hurdles	Svetla Dimitrova; Bulgaria	12.72	Yuliya Graudyn; Russia	12.93	Yordanka Donkova; Bulgaria	12.93
400 metres hurdles	Sally Gunnell; Great Britain	53.33	Silvia Rieger; Germany	54.68	Anna Knoroz; Russia	54.68
10 kilometres walk	Sari Essayah; Finland	42:37	Annarita Sidoti; Italy	42:43	Yelena Nikolayeva; Russia	42:43
4 × 100 metres relay	Melanie Paschke; Silke Knoll; Bettina Zipp; Silke Lichtenhagen; Germany	42.90	Natalya Anisimova; Marina Trandenkova; Galina Malchugina; Irina Privalova; Russia	42.96	Desislava Dimitrova; Svetla Dimitrova; Anelia Nuneva; Petya Pendareva; Bulgaria	43.00
4 × 400 metres relay	Francine Landre; Évelyne Élien; Viviane Dorsile; Marie-José Pérec; France	3:22.34	Natalya Khrushcheleva; Yelena Andreyeva; Tatyana Zakharova; Svetlana Goncharenko; Russia	3:24.06	Karin Janke; Heike Meißner; Uta Rohländer; Anja Rücker; Germany	3:24.10

=== Field ===
1986 |1990 |1994 |1998 |2002 |

Event	Gold		Silver		Bronze	
High jump	Britta Bilač; Slovenia	2.00	Yelena Gulyayeva; Russia	1.96	Nelė Žilinskienė; Lithuania	1.93
Long jump	Heike Drechsler; Germany	7.14	Inessa Kravets; Ukraine	6.99	Fiona May; Italy	6.90
Triple jump	Anna Biryukova; Russia	14.89	Inna Lasovskaya; Russia	14.85	Inessa Kravets; Ukraine	14.67
Shot put	Vita Pavlysh; Ukraine	19.61	Astrid Kumbernuss; Germany	19.49	Svetla Mitkova; Bulgaria	19.45
Discus throw	Ilke Wyludda; Germany	68.72	Ellina Zvereva; Belarus	64.46	Mette Bergmann; Norway	64.34
Javelin throw	Trine Hattestad; Norway	68.00	Karen Forkel; Germany	66.10	Felicia Moldovan; Romania	64.34
Heptathlon	Sabine Braun; Germany	6,419	Rita Ináncsi; Hungary	6,404	Urszula Włodarczyk; Poland	6,322

== Medal table ==
* Host nation (Finland)

Rank	Nation	Gold	Silver	Bronze	Total
1	Russia (RUS)	10	8	7	25
2	Great Britain (GBR)	6	5	2	13
3	Germany (GER)	5	4	5	14
4	France (FRA)	4	3	2	9
5	Ukraine (UKR)	3	6	3	12
6	Spain (ESP)	3	2	4	9
7	Norway (NOR)	3	2	1	6
8	Italy (ITA)	2	3	3	8
9	Portugal (POR)	2	1	0	3
10	Bulgaria (BUL)	2	0	3	5
11	Belarus (BLR)	1	4	0	5
12	Finland (FIN)*	1	1	0	2
13	Ireland (IRL)	1	0	0	1
13	Slovenia (SLO)	1	0	0	1
15	Sweden (SWE)	0	2	0	2
16	Belgium (BEL)	0	1	2	3
17	Czech Republic (CZE)	0	1	1	2
17	Poland (POL)	0	1	1	2
19	Hungary (HUN)	0	1	0	1
20	Romania (ROU)	0	0	3	3
21	Switzerland (SUI)	0	0	2	2
22	Croatia (CRO)	0	0	1	1
22	Greece (GRE)	0	0	1	1
22	Latvia (LAT)	0	0	1	1
22	Lithuania (LTU)	0	0	1	1
Totals (25 entries)		44	45	43	132

== Participation ==
According to an unofficial count, 1125 athletes from 43 countries participated in the event, 12 athletes more than the official number of 1113 and one country less than the official number of 44 as published. The announced athlete from Macedonia did not show.

- Albania (1)
- Armenia (1)
- Austria (12)
- Belarus (37)
- Belgium (13)
- Bosnia and Herzegovina (2)
- Bulgaria (21)
- Croatia (4)
- Cyprus (7)
- Czech Republic (23)
- Denmark (12)
- Estonia (17)
- Finland (85)
- France (78)
- Georgia (2)
- Germany (101)
- Great Britain & N.I. (90)
- Greece (18)
- Hungary (27)
- Independent European Participants (Yugoslavia) (8)
- Iceland (6)
- Ireland (21)
- Israel (6)
- Italy (73)
- Latvia (11)
- Liechtenstein (1)
- Lithuania (11)
- Luxembourg (1)
- Malta (1)
- Moldova (6)
- Netherlands (23)
- Norway (32)
- Poland (37)
- Portugal (25)
- Romania (22)
- Russia (96)
- Slovakia (11)
- Slovenia (7)
- Spain (58)
- Sweden (45)
- Switzerland (28)
- Turkey (6)
- Ukraine (39)

== See also ==
- 1994 in athletics (track and field)

== Notes ==
Differences to competition format since the 1990 European Championships:

- Women's Triple Jump was added as a new event
- East and West Germany competed as one team
- Countries that made up the Soviet Union competed as separate teams
- Countries that made up Yugoslavia competed as separate teams
- Countries that made up Czechoslovakia competed as separate teams
