= Melanie Paschke =

German sprinter

Personal information
- Full name: Melanie Paschke
- Born: 29 June 1970 (age 56) Braunschweig, West Germany
- Height: 1.68 m (5 ft 6 in)

Sport
- Country: Germany
- Sport: Athletics
- Events: 100 metres, 200 metres

Achievements and titles
- Personal best: 60 metres: 7.09 (February 1996) 100 metres: 11.04 (June 1995) 200 metres: 22.53 (July 1995)
Medal record
Women's athletics
Representing Germany
World Championships
Gold medal – first place	2001 Edmonton	4×100 m
Bronze medal – third place	1995 Gothenburg	4×100 m
World Indoor Championships
Silver medal – second place	1995 Barcelona	60 m
European Championships
Gold medal – first place	1994 Helsinki	4×100 m
Silver medal – second place	1998 Budapest	4×100 m
Silver medal – second place	2002 Munich	4×100 m
Bronze medal – third place	1994 Helsinki	100 m
Bronze medal – third place	1998 Budapest	200 m
Summer Universiade
Gold medal – first place	1995 Fukuoka	100 m

Melanie Paschke (born 29 June 1970) is a retired German sprinter, who specialised in the 100 metres, 200 metres and 4 × 100 metres relay.

== Career ==
Her personal best time in the 100 m is 11.04 seconds, achieved in June 1995 in Bremen. This places her tenth on the German all-time list, behind Marlies Göhr, Marita Koch, Silke Gladisch, Katrin Krabbe, Heike Drechsler, Bärbel Wöckel, Annegret Richter, Romy Müller, Monika Hamann, Inge Helten and Ingrid Auerswald.

Paschke competed for the clubs LG Braunschweig and TV Wattenscheid 01 during her active career.

== Achievements ==
Year	Competition	Venue	Position	Event	Notes
Representing Germany
1993	World Championships	Stuttgart, Germany	5th	4 × 100 m relay	42.79
1994	European Indoor Championships	Paris, France	3rd	60 m	7.19
1994	European Championships	Helsinki, Finland	3rd	100 m	11.28 (wind: +0.6 m/s)
1994	European Championships	Helsinki, Finland	1st	4 × 100 m relay	42.90
1994	World Cup	London, England	2nd	4 × 100 m relay	43.22
1995	World Indoor Championships	Barcelona, Spain	2nd	60 m	7.10
1995	World Championships	Gothenburg, Sweden	6th	100 m	11.10
1995	World Championships	Gothenburg, Sweden	4th	200 m	22.60
1995	World Championships	Gothenburg, Sweden	3rd	4 × 100 m relay	43.01
1995	Universiade	Fukuoka, Japan	1st	100 m	11.16
1996	Olympic Games	Atlanta, United States	semi-final	100 m	11.14
1996	Olympic Games	Atlanta, United States	semi-final	200 m	22.81
1997	World Championships	Athens, Greece	6th	100 m	11.19
1997	World Championships	Athens, Greece	4th	4 × 100 m relay	42.44
1998	European Indoor Championships	Valencia, Spain	1st	60 m	7.14
1998	European Indoor Championships	Valencia, Spain	2nd	200 m	22.50
1998	European Championships	Budapest, Hungary	3rd	200 m	22.78
1998	European Championships	Budapest, Hungary	2nd	4 × 100 m relay	42.68
1998	World Cup	Johannesburg, South Africa	6th	200 m	22.70
2001	World Championships	Edmonton, Canada	1st	4 × 100 m relay	42.32
2002	European Championships	Munich, Germany	5th	100 m	11.37 (wind: -0.7 m/s)
2002	European Championships	Munich, Germany	2nd	4 × 100 m relay	42.54
2002	World Cup	Madrid, Spain	5th	100 m	11.37

== See also ==
- German all-time top lists - 100 metres
