= Desislava Dimitrova =

Bulgarian sprinter

Personal information
- Nationality: Bulgarian
- Born: 19 June 1972 (age 54) Sofia, Bulgaria

Sport
- Sport: Sprinting
- Event: 4 × 100 metres relay
- Club: Levski Sofia
Medal record
Women's athletics
Representing Bulgaria
European Championships
Bronze medal – third place	1994 Helsinki	4×100 m

Desislava Dimitrova (Bulgarian: Десислава Димитрова) (born 19 June 1972) is a Bulgarian sprinter. She competed in the women's 4 × 100 metres relay at the 1996 Summer Olympics.
