= 1993 World Championships in Athletics =

Athletics competition in Stuttgart, Germany

4th World Championships in Athletics
- Host city: Stuttgart, Germany
- Nations: 187
- Athletes: 1689
- Dates: 13–22 August 1993
- Opened by: President Richard von Weizsäcker
- Main venue: Neckarstadium

The 4th World Championships in Athletics (German: Leichtathletik-Weltmeisterschaften 1993), under the auspices of the International Association of Athletics Federations, were held in the Neckarstadium, Stuttgart, Germany between 13 and 22 August with the participation of 187 nations. Originally held every four years in 1983, 1987 and 1991, these championships began a two-year cycle between events.

== Event ==
The 1993 World Championships was the final time the women's 3000 m would be contested. At subsequent Championships the race was replaced by the longer 5000 m.

== Men's results ==
=== Track ===
1987 | 1991 | 1993 | 1995 | 1997

Event	Gold		Silver		Bronze	
100 m	Linford Christie (GBR)	9.87 (AR)	Andre Cason (USA)	9.92	Dennis Mitchell (USA)	9.99
200 m	Frankie Fredericks (NAM)	19.85 (CR/AR)	John Regis (GBR)	19.94	Carl Lewis (USA)	19.99
400 m	Michael Johnson (USA)	43.65 (CR)	Butch Reynolds (USA)	44.13	Samson Kitur (KEN)	44.54
800 m	Paul Ruto (KEN)	1:44.71	Giuseppe D'Urso (ITA)	1:44.86	Billy Konchellah (KEN)	1:44.89
1500 m	Noureddine Morceli (ALG)	3:34.24	Fermin Cacho Ruiz (ESP)	3:35.56	Abdi Bile (SOM)	3:35.96
5000 m	Ismael Kirui (KEN)	13:02.75	Haile Gebrselassie (ETH)	13:03.17	Fita Bayisa (ETH)	13:05.40
10,000 m	Haile Gebrselassie (ETH)	27:46.02	Moses Tanui (KEN)	27:46.54	Richard Chelimo (KEN)	28:06.02
Marathon	Mark Plaatjes (USA)	2:13:57	Luketz Swartbooi (NAM)	2:14:11	Bert van Vlaanderen (NED)	2:15:12
110 m hurdles	Colin Jackson (GBR)	12.91 (WR)	Tony Jarrett (GBR)	13.00	Jack Pierce (USA)	13.06
400 m hurdles	Kevin Young (USA)	47.18	Samuel Matete (ZAM)	47.60	Winthrop Graham (JAM)	47.62
3000 m steeplech.	Moses Kiptanui (KEN)	8:06.36 (CR)	Patrick Sang (KEN)	8:07.53	Alessandro Lambruschini (ITA)	8:08.78
20 km walk	Valentí Massana (ESP)	1:22:31	Giovanni De Benedictis (ITA)	1:23:06	Daniel Plaza (ESP)	1:23:18
50 km walk	Jesus Garcia (ESP)	3:41:41	Valentin Kononen (FIN)	3:42:02	Valeriy Spitsyn (RUS)	3:42:50
4 × 100 m relay	United States (USA); Jon Drummond; Andre Cason; Dennis Mitchell; Leroy Burrell; Calvin Smith*	37.48	Great Britain (GBR); Colin Jackson; Tony Jarrett; John Regis; Linford Christie; Jason John*; Darren Braithwaite*	37.77 (AR)	Canada (CAN); Robert Esmie; Glenroy Gilbert; Bruny Surin; Atlee Mahorn	37.83 (NR)
4 × 400 m relay	United States (USA); Andrew Valmon; Quincy Watts; Butch Reynolds; Michael Johnson; Antonio Pettigrew*; Derek Mills*	2:54.29 (WR)	Kenya (KEN); Kennedy Ochieng; Simon Kemboi; Abednego Matilu; Samson Kitur	2:59.82	Germany (GER); Rico Lieder; Karsten Just; Olaf Hense; Thomas Schönlebe	2:59.99
WR world record | AR area record | CR championship record | GR games record | NR national record | OR Olympic record | PB personal best | SB season best | WL world leading (in a given season)

Note: * Indicates athletes who ran in preliminary rounds.

=== Field ===
1987 | 1991 | 1993 | 1995 | 1997

Event	Gold		Silver		Bronze	
Long jump	Mike Powell (USA)	8.59	Stanislav Tarasenko (RUS)	8.16	Vitaliy Kyrylenko (UKR)	8.15
Triple jump	Mike Conley (USA)	17.86	Leonid Voloshin (RUS)	17.65	Jonathan Edwards (GBR)	17.44
High jump	Javier Sotomayor (CUB)	2.40 (CR)	Artur Partyka (POL)	2.37	Steve Smith (GBR)	2.37
Pole vault	Sergey Bubka (UKR)	6.00 (CR)	Grigoriy Yegorov (KAZ)	5.90 (AR)	Maksim Tarasov (RUS)	5.80
Pole vault	Sergey Bubka (UKR)	6.00 (CR)	Grigoriy Yegorov (KAZ)	5.90 (AR)	Igor Trandenkov (RUS)	5.80
Shot put	Werner Günthör (SUI)	21.97	Randy Barnes (USA)	21.80	Oleksandr Bagach (UKR)	20.40^{1}
Discus throw	Lars Riedel (GER)	67.72	Dmitriy Shevchenko (RUS)	66.90	Jürgen Schult (GER)	66.12
Hammer throw	Andrey Abduvaliyev (TJK)	81.64 (AR)	Igor Astapkovich (BLR)	79.88	Tibor Gécsek (HUN)	79.54
Javelin throw	Jan Železný (CZE)	85.98 (CR)	Kimmo Kinnunen (FIN)	84.78	Mick Hill (GBR)	82.96
Decathlon	Dan O'Brien (USA)	8817 (CR)	Eduard Hämäläinen (BLR)	8724	Paul Meier (GER)	8548
WR world record | AR area record | CR championship record | GR games record | NR national record | OR Olympic record | PB personal best | SB season best | WL world leading (in a given season)

^{1} Michael Stulce of the United States originally finished third, but was disqualified after testing positive for excess testosterone and mestanolone.

== Women's results ==
=== Track ===
1987 |1991 |1993 |1995 |1997

Event	Gold		Silver		Bronze	
100 m	Gail Devers; United States	10.82; CR	Merlene Ottey; Jamaica	10.82; CR	Gwen Torrence; United States	10.89
200 m	Merlene Ottey; Jamaica	21.98	Gwen Torrence; United States	22.00	Irina Privalova; Russia	22.13
400 m	Jearl Miles; United States	49.82	Natasha Kaiser-Brown; United States	50.17	Sandie Richards; Jamaica	50.44
800 m	Maria Mutola; Mozambique	1:55.43; AR	Lyubov Gurina; Russia	1:57.10	Ella Kovacs; Romania	1:57.92
1500 m	Liu Dong; China	4:00.50	Sonia O'Sullivan; Ireland	4:03.48	Hassiba Boulmerka; Algeria	4:04.29
3000 m	Qu Yunxia; China	8:28.71; CR	Zhang Linli; China	8:29.25	Zhang Lirong; China	8:31.95
10,000 m	Wang Junxia; China	30:49.30; CR	Zhong Huandi; China	31:12.55	Sally Barsosio; Kenya	31:15.38
Marathon	Junko Asari; Japan	2:30:03	Manuela Machado; Portugal	2:30:54	Tomoe Abe; Japan	2:31:01
100 m hurdles	Gail Devers; United States	12.46; AR	Marina Azyabina; Russia	12.60	Lynda Tolbert; United States	12.67
400 m hurdles	Sally Gunnell; Great Britain	52.74; WR	Sandra Farmer-Patrick; United States	52.79; AR	Margarita Ponomaryova; Russia	53.48
10 km walk	Sari Essayah; Finland	42:59	Ileana Salvador; Italy	43:08	Encarna Granados; Spain	43:21
4 × 100 m relay	Russia; Olga Bogoslovskaya; Galina Malchugina; Natalya Voronova; Irina Privalova; Marina Trandenkova*	41.49 CR	United States; Michelle Finn; Gwen Torrence; Wendy Vereen; Gail Devers; Sheila Echols*	41.49 CR	Jamaica; Michelle Freeman; Juliet Campbell; Nikole Mitchell; Merlene Ottey; Dahlia Duhaney*	41.94=NR
4 × 400 m relay	United States; Gwen Torrence; Maicel Malone; Natasha Kaiser; Jearl Miles; Terri Dendy*; Michelle Collins*	3:16.71 CR	Russia; Yelena Rouzina; Tatyana Alekseyeva; Margarita Ponomaryova; Irina Privalova; Yelena Golesheva*; Vera Sychugova*	3:18.38	Great Britain; Linda Keough; Phylis Smith; Tracy Goddard; Sally Gunnell	3:23.41
WR world record | AR area record | CR championship record | GR games record | NR national record | OR Olympic record | PB personal best | SB season best | WL world leading (in a given season)

Note: * Indicates athletes who ran in preliminary rounds.

=== Field ===
1987 |1991 |1993 |1995 |1997

Event	Gold		Silver		Bronze	
Long jump	Heike Drechsler; Germany	7.11	Larysa Berezhna; Ukraine	6.98	Renata Nielsen; Denmark	6.76
Triple jump	Anna Biryukova; Russia	15.09; WR	Yolanda Chen; Russia	14.70	Iva Prandzheva; Bulgaria	14.23
High jump	Ioamnet Quintero; Cuba	1.99	Silvia Costa; Cuba	1.97	Sigrid Kirchmann; Austria	1.97; NR
Shot put	Huang Zhihong; China	20.57	Svetlana Krivelyova; Russia	19.97	Kathrin Neimke; Germany	19.71
Discus throw	Olga Chernyavskaya; Russia	67.40	Daniela Costian; Australia	65.36	Min Chunfeng; China	65.26
Javelin throw	Trine Hattestad; Norway	69.18	Karen Forkel; Germany	65.80	Natalya Shikolenko; Belarus	65.64
Heptathlon	Jackie Joyner-Kersee; United States	6837	Sabine Braun; Germany	6797	Svetlana Buraga; Belarus	6635
WR world record | AR area record | CR championship record | GR games record | NR national record | OR Olympic record | PB personal best | SB season best | WL world leading (in a given season)

== Medal table ==
* Host nation (Germany)

Rank	Nation	Gold	Silver	Bronze	Total
1	United States (USA)	13	7	5	25
2	China (CHN)	4	2	2	8
3	Russia (RUS)	3	8	5	16
4	Great Britain (GBR)	3	3	4	10
4	Kenya (KEN)	3	3	4	10
6	Germany (GER)*	2	2	4	8
7	Spain (ESP)	2	1	2	5
8	Cuba (CUB)	2	1	0	3
9	Finland (FIN)	1	2	0	3
10	Jamaica (JAM)	1	1	3	5
11	Ukraine (UKR)	1	1	2	4
12	Ethiopia (ETH)	1	1	1	3
13	Namibia (NAM)	1	1	0	2
14	Algeria (ALG)	1	0	1	2
14	Japan (JPN)	1	0	1	2
16	Czech Republic (CZE)	1	0	0	1
16	Mozambique (MOZ)	1	0	0	1
16	Norway (NOR)	1	0	0	1
16	Switzerland (SUI)	1	0	0	1
16	Tajikistan (TJK)	1	0	0	1
21	Italy (ITA)	0	3	1	4
22	Belarus (BLR)	0	2	2	4
23	Australia (AUS)	0	1	0	1
23	Ireland (IRL)	0	1	0	1
23	Kazakhstan (KAZ)	0	1	0	1
23	Poland (POL)	0	1	0	1
23	Portugal (POR)	0	1	0	1
23	Zambia (ZAM)	0	1	0	1
29	Austria (AUT)	0	0	1	1
29	Bulgaria (BUL)	0	0	1	1
29	Canada (CAN)	0	0	1	1
29	Denmark (DEN)	0	0	1	1
29	Hungary (HUN)	0	0	1	1
29	Netherlands (NED)	0	0	1	1
29	Romania (ROU)	0	0	1	1
29	Somalia (SOM)	0	0	1	1
Totals (36 entries)		44	44	45	133

== See also ==
- 1993 in athletics (track and field)
