= Zhanna Pintusevich-Block =

Ukrainian sprinter (born 1972)

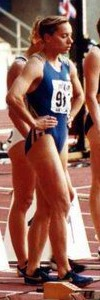

Personal information
- Native name: Жанна Пінтусевич-Блок
- Full name: Zhanna Pintusevich-Block
- Nationality: Ukrainian
- Born: Zhanna Tarnopolskaya; 6 July 1972 (age 54) Nizhyn, Ukrainian SSR, Soviet Union

Sport
- Sport: Track and field
- Events: Sprint; 60 metres, 100 metres, and 200 metres
- Coached by: Mark Block

Achievements and titles
- Highest world ranking: World champion (60 m, 100 m, 200 m)
- Personal best: 100 metres: 10.82 seconds
Medal record
Women's Athletics
Representing Ukraine
World Championships
Gold medal – first place	1997 Athens	200 m
Gold medal – first place	2001 Edmonton	100 m
Silver medal – second place	1997 Athens	100 m
Disqualified	2003 Paris	100 m
World Indoor Championships
Disqualified	Birmingham 2003	60 m
Bronze medal – third place	Toronto 1993	60 m
European Championships
Silver medal – second place	1994 Helsinki	100 m
Silver medal – second place	1994 Helsinki	200 m
Silver medal – second place	1998 Budapest	200 m
Goodwill Games
Gold medal – first place	2001 Brisbane	4 × 100 metres
Silver medal – second place	1998 New York City	100 m
Silver medal – second place	1998 New York City	200 m
Silver medal – second place	2001 Brisbane	100 m
European Cup
Gold medal – first place	1994 Birmingham	100 m
Gold medal – first place	1994 Birmingham	4 × 100 metres
Bronze medal – third place	1993 Rome	100 m
IAAF World Cup
Bronze medal – third place	1998 Johannesburg	200 m
Representing Unified Team
European Indoor Championships
Gold medal – first place	1992 Genoa	60 m
Representing Soviet Union
European Junior Championships
Gold medal – first place	1991 Thessaloniki	100 m
Gold medal – first place	1991 Thessaloniki	200 m
Silver medal – second place	1991 Thessaloniki	4 × 400 metres
- Updated on 7 July 2015

Zhanna Pintusevich-Block (Ukrainian: Жанна Пінтусевич-Блок; née Tarnopolskaya; born 6 July 1972) is a Ukrainian former world champion sprinter who competed in the Olympic Games.

== Early life ==
Zhanna Pintusevich-Block comes from a Jewish family. She was born in Nizhyn, Soviet Union and raised by her mother after her father left when she was three. They lived in a one-room house with no running water and used a coal stove for heat.

== Track career ==
In 1991, Block won the 100 metres and 200 metres at the European Junior Championships, along with a silver in the 4 × 400 metres relay while representing the USSR. In 1992, Block won the European Indoor Championships for 60 m and in 1993 won the bronze medal in the same even at the World Championships in Toronto.

She was 1997 World 200 m Champion and 2001 World 100 m champion. She also won 2 World silvers and 3 European silvers in the sprints. In 2001, she was named Person of the Year in Ukraine for Sports, ahead of former heavyweight champion boxer Wladimir Klitschko and footballer Andriy Shevchenko.

Block was identified by Victor Conte as allegedly having taken illegal performance-enhancing drugs supplied by Conte in the BALCO scandal. In 2011, she was handed a two-year ban from sports for doping violation without a hearing. While never being convicted of using illegal drugs, her results from 30 November 2002 onward were disqualified. Her husband and coach, Mark Block, was given a 10-year ban from sport for receiving performance-enhancing drugs as part of the BALCO scandal.

She took part in the 100 and 200 metres races at both the 1996 Summer Olympics and the 2000 Summer Olympics, reaching the final three times. She also took part in the 100 m and 4 × 100 metres relay at the 2004 Olympics. However, she failed to progress to the finals. She has never won an Olympic medal but she managed to finish in fourth place in the 100 m final in Sydney. Her 100 metres personal best time of 10.82 seconds was set in Edmonton, Alberta, Canada on 6 August 2001.

== Personal life ==
She has been married to her coach, Mark Block, since 1999 and has one daughter named Anna Block. Anna also runs track and competes at the national level. Anna is all-state in cross country and currently one of the best in her country in the 800m. Her current time is 2:16.

== See also ==
- List of select Jewish track and field athletes

== Sources ==
- Evans, Hilary; Gjerde, Arild; Heijmans, Jeroen; Mallon, Bill; et al. "Zhanna Pintusevych-Blok". Olympics at Sports-Reference.com. Sports Reference LLC. Archived from the original on 18 April 2020.
