= Irina Privalova =

Russian athlete (born 1968)

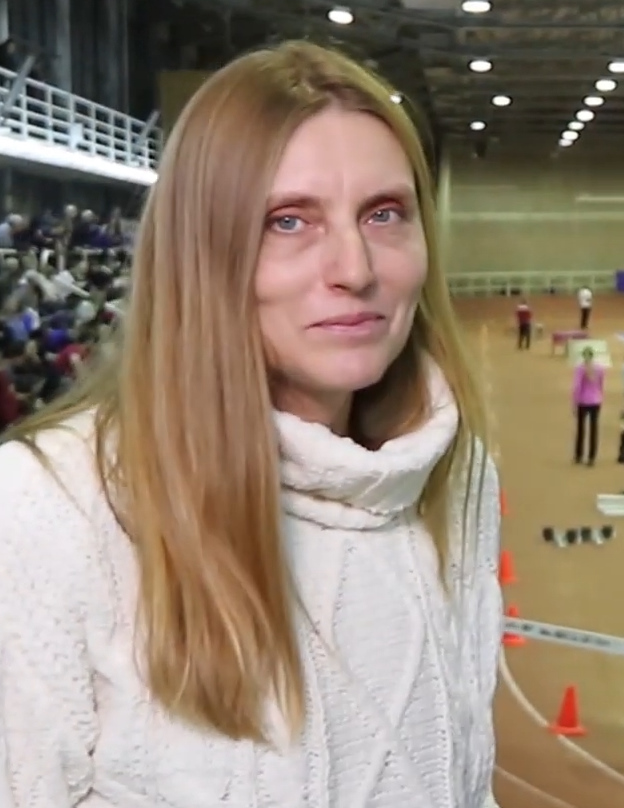
- Privalova in 2020

Personal information
- Born: 22 November 1968 (age 57) Malakhovka, Russian SFSR, Soviet Union
- Height: 174 cm (5 ft 9 in)
- Weight: 54 kg (119 lb)
Medal record
Women's athletics
Olympic Games
Representing the Unified Team
Silver medal – second place	1992 Barcelona	4 × 100 m
Bronze medal – third place	1992 Barcelona	100 m
Representing Russia
Gold medal – first place	2000 Sydney	400 m hurdles
Bronze medal – third place	2000 Sydney	4 × 400 m
World Championships
Representing Soviet Union
Silver medal – second place	1991 Tokyo	4 × 100 m relay
Representing Russia
Gold medal – first place	1993 Stuttgart	4 × 100 m
Silver medal – second place	1993 Stuttgart	4 × 400 m
Silver medal – second place	1995 Gothenburg	200 m
Bronze medal – third place	1993 Stuttgart	200 m
Bronze medal – third place	1995 Gothenburg	100 m
World Indoor Athletics Championships
Representing Soviet Union
Gold medal – first place	1991 Seville	60 m
Silver medal – second place	1991 Seville	200 m
Representing Russia
Silver medal – second place	1993 Toronto	60 m
Gold medal – first place	1993 Toronto	200 m
Gold medal – first place	1995 Barcelona	400 m
European Championships
Gold medal – first place	1994 Helsinki	100 m
Gold medal – first place	1994 Helsinki	200 m
Gold medal – first place	1998 Budapest	200 m
Silver medal – second place	1994 Helsinki	4 × 100 m
Silver medal – second place	1998 Budapest	100 m
Bronze medal – third place	1998 Budapest	4 × 100 m
IAAF World Cup
Gold medal – first place	1994 London	100 m
Silver medal – second place	1994 London	200 m
Gold medal – first place	1994 London	400 m

Irina Anatolyevna Privalova, formerly Sergeyeva, (Russian: Ирина Анатольевна Привалова; born 22 November 1968 in Malakhovka) is a Russian Olympic gold medallist athlete. Her Summer Olympics debut was in 1992 in the sprint events, where she won two medals a bronze in the 100 m and running the anchor leg in the 4 × 100 team, a silver and came fourth in the 200, representing the Unified Team. With three European individual championships and three individual world medals, Irina Privalova had been a formidable competitor during most of the 1990s (see Sprints) but had not yet won an outdoor international event gold medal (as an individual athlete, she had won relay gold in 1993).

In 2000, she switched to the 400 m hurdles discipline winning the gold medal in 53.02 s (see 400 m Hurdles) and a bronze in the 4 × 400 m relay team for Russia.

Irina Privalova is currently the world indoor record holder in the 50 m (5.96 s) and 60 m (6.92 s) sprints (See World Indoor Records). She has also been the world indoor champion at the 60 m (7.02 s in 1991), 200 m (22.15 s in 1993), and 400 m (50.23 s in 1995) events the first athlete to win titles, indoors or outdoors, at three different distances.

Privalova achieved her best time (10.77 s) in the 100 m in 1994 – the fastest time for nine years.

In 2008, aged 39, she reached the semi-finals of the 100 m at Russian championships in attempting to qualify for her fourth Olympics. She had tried moving to the 800 m to qualify for the 2004 Olympics.

In 2020, Privalova stood for the presidency of the Russian Athletics Federation. She failed to win but became vice-president. She later was called to stand-in as acting president when the elected president moved to a government agency (See Russian Athletic Federation Presidency).

== Sprints ==
Privalova came to international recognition in 1991 at the World Indoor Championships that year. Racing as Irina Privalova-Sergeyeva, in the 60 m she defeated the great Jamaican sprinter Merlene Ottey who reached the final undefeated in 82 successive races. Ottey had her revenge in the 200 m with Privalova coming second, Ottey equalling the world record in her victory.

At the 1992 Barcelona Olympics, racing as Irina Privalova, she won a bronze medal in the 100 m. The race was incredibly tight – Gail Devers won in 10.82 s, Juliet Cuthbert was second in 10.83 s, and Privalova third in 10.84 s. Privalova also came fourth in the 200 m.

At the 1993 World Indoor Championships, Privalova narrowly lost to Gail Devers in the 60 m, 6.95 s to 6.97 s, but won the 200 m title (in 22.15 s, then the second fastest time ever; she want faster in 1995 at 22.10 s, second fastest time ever to the world record of 21.87 s).

In the 1993 World Athletics Championships, Privalova won her only gold medal at a world championship in the 4 × 100 m relay. She narrowly held off the United States's Gail Devers on the anchor leg – both teams recording a championship record time of 41.49 s.

In 1994, in August at the European Championships, for Russia she won gold in the 100 and 200 m and silver in the 4 × 100 m relay; in September, at the 1994 IAAF World Cup, representing Europe, she won the 100 m and 400 m, and came third in the 200 m.

In 1995, Privalova moved up to the 400 m for the World Indoor Championships that year where she won in her first major race over the distance – she had not even contested the Russian championships at that distance.

Her campaign at the 1996 Olympics was curtailed by injury. She was eliminated at the semi-final stage in the 100 m, did not start the 200 m, but was part of the Russian team that came fourth in the 4 × 100 m relay.

In 1997, Privalova suffered a torn muscle in the final of 60 m at the World Indoor Championships. She was out for 18 months but returned to win the 200 m at the European Championships in 1998. In the individual events she came fourth in the 100 m and won bronze in the 200 m.

In 1998, at the European Championships, Privalova found a time of 10.83 s was only good enough for silver in 100 m, being defeated by Christine Arron's European record winning time of 10.73 s. However, she successfully defended her European title in the 200 m and also won Silver in the 4 × 100 m relay.

In 1999, her World Championships ended prematurely when she had to withdraw from all her events after completing the first round of the 100 m. She did not compete again until the 2000 indoor season.

== 400 m Hurdles ==
In 2000, Privalova switched to the 400 m hurdles as her main event targeting the 2000 Olympics. This followed a year out of the sport with injury, forcing her to miss the 1999 World Championships.

She worked on the switch with her coach and husband, Vladimir Paraschuk. Paraschuk chose the 400 m hurdles because it was an event that reduced the risk of injury, was within Privalova's capabilities as an existing 400 m runner, and it had at the time a comparative lack of formidable competitors. In addition, she had tried athletics multi-events so had had some experience with hurdling.

She achieved Olympic gold after running only 6 races previous to arriving at the games.

Injury and motherhood forced her retirement after 2000 and so she was never able to train to try the challenge of breaking the 400 m hurdles world record: in 2001, she suffered a knee ligament injury and then gave birth in December 2001 to her second child, forcing her to miss the 2002 season.

In 2004, she attempted a switch to 800 m to attempt to qualify for the Olympics that year but failed in her attempt. She had already stopped racing the 60 m ('her favourite event') to avoid injuries and was using the 800 m as part of her training schedule.

== Russian Athletics Federation Presidency ==
In 2020, Privalova stood for the presidency of the Russian Athletics Federation (RusAF). She was chosen as first vice-president after coming third in the vote.

In February 2021, the winner Peter Ivanov relinquished his authority until December 2022 to take up a position with a government agency with Privalova taking charge.

== World Indoor Records ==
Privalova achieved world record times indoors on six occasions:

- 6.05 s for the 50 m sprint in Moscow on 2 February 1993.
- 6.04 s for the 50 m sprint in Grenoble on 7 February 1993.
- 6.03 s for the 50 m sprint in Moscow on 1 February 1994.
- 5.96 s for the 50 m sprint in Madrid on 9 February 1995.
- 6.92 s for the 60 m sprint in Madrid on 11 February 1993.
- 6.92 s for the 60 m sprint in Madrid on 9 February 1995.

She also two other times that would have been records but were not ratified due to faults with the timing:

- 6.00 s for the 50 m sprint in Moscow on 2 February 1993 – photo-finish device was not lined up correctly.
- 5.99 s for the 50 m sprint in Vienna on 6 February 1994 – time recorded during a 60 m race.

In addition, she shares the world's best time for the unofficial distance (for record purposes) of 300 m. Her time of 35.45 s was achieved on 17 January 1993 in Moscow (it was equalled by Shaunae Miller-Uibo in 2018).

== Personal life ==
Privalova originally competed under her married name of Sergeyeva. Her first pregnancy forced her to miss the 1988 Olympics. After a separation and divorce, she competed under her maiden name of Privalova.

Privalova married her coach, Vladimir Paraschuk, and in 2000 they lived in Moscow with sons from previous marriages. Paraschuk was also, at that time, coach of track and field at Moscow State University from which Privalova has a degree in journalism (graduated in 1995). Under the tutelage of Paraschuk, Privalova trained alone, using the somewhat spartan facilities of the university, rather than attending a sports institute like most of her compatriots.

In 2008, she is described as the mother of three children: Alexei, aged 20; Maria, aged 6; and Katya, then 2 years old.

== Accolades and awards ==
In 1994, Privalova was awarded European Athlete of the Year trophy for women.

In 2001, she was awarded the Silver Order of Merit by the IAAF (World Athletics) for an 'exceptional contribution to the world athletics movement'.

== World Rankings ==
Privalova was ranked among the best in the world in both the 100 and 200 m sprint events in the 1990s, then again later in the 400 m hurdles when she switched to that event in 2000. This is according to the votes of the experts of Track and Field News.

World Rankings
Year	100 m	200 m	400 m	400 m h
1991	4th	4th	-	-
1992	1st	2nd	-	-
1993	4th	3rd	-	-
1994	3rd	3rd	9th	-
1995	3rd	3rd	-	-
1996	7th	5th	-	-
1997	–	–	-	-
1998	9th	5th	-	-
1999	-	-	-	-
2000	–	–	-	1st

Awards and achievements
Preceded by Sally Gunnell	Women's European Athlete of the Year; 1994	Succeeded by Sonia O'Sullivan
Sporting positions
Preceded by Daimí Pernía	Women's 400 m Hurdles Best Year Performance; 2000	Succeeded by Nezha Bidouane
