= Athletics at the 1996 Summer Olympics – Women's 200 metres =

Women's 200 metres at the Games of the XXVI Olympiad
- Venue: Olympic Stadium
- Dates: July 31 (heats and quarterfinals); August 1 (semifinals and final)
- Competitors: 48 from 36 nations
- Winning time: 22.12

Medalists
1st place, gold medalist(s)		Marie-José Pérec; France
2nd place, silver medalist(s)		Merlene Ottey; Jamaica
3rd place, bronze medalist(s)		Mary Onyali; Nigeria

These are the official results of the women's 200 metres event at the 1996 Summer Olympics in Atlanta, Georgia. There were a total number of 47 participating athletes, with two rounds (six heats in round 1, four heats in round 2), two semifinals and a final.

== Records ==
These were the standing world and Olympic records (in seconds) prior to the 1996 Summer Olympics.

World record	21.34	(United States) Florence Griffith Joyner	Indianapolis, Indiana (USA)	16 July 1988
Olympic record	21.34	(United States) Florence Griffith Joyner	Seoul (KOR)	29 September 1988

== Results ==
=== Heats ===
Top four in each heat and next eight fastest advanced to the quarterfinals.

Heat one

Rank	Name	Nationality	Time	Lane
1	Carlette Guidry	United States	22.37	5
2	Mary Onyali	Nigeria	22.42	8
3	Melanie Paschke	Germany	22.93	3
4	Patricia Rodríguez	Colombia	23.13	2
5	Yan Jiankui	China	23.21	1
6	Myra Mayberry	Puerto Rico	23.23	7
7	Zlatka Georgieva	Bulgaria	24.05	4
8	Laure Kuetey	Benin	25.57	6

Heat two

Rank	Name	Nationality	Time	Lane
1	Dannette Young	United States	22.65	2
2	Melinda Gainsford-Taylor	Australia	22.70	7
3	Lucrécia Jardim	Portugal	22.95	5
4	Viktoriya Fomenko	Ukraine	23.18	1
5	Sandy Myers	Spain	23.18	6
6	Calister Ubah	Nigeria	23.34	3
7	Dora Kyriakou	Cyprus	23.85	4
8	Sylla M'Mah Touré	Guinea	26.64	8

Heat three

Rank	Name	Nationality	Time	Lane
1	Juliet Cuthbert	Jamaica	23.03	6
2	Irina Privalova	Russia	23.16	2
3	Cathy Freeman	Australia	23.25	1
4	Sanna Hernesniemi	Finland	23.35	7
5	Mireille Donders	Switzerland	23.52	8
6	Maia Azarashvili	Georgia	23.63	5
7	Felipa Palacios	Colombia	24.12	4
8	Lineo Shoai	Lesotho	26.25	3

Heat four

Rank	Name	Nationality	Time	Lane
1	Merlene Ottey	Jamaica	22.92	7
2	Katharine Merry	Great Britain	23.14	1
3	Monika Gachevska	Bulgaria	23.30	6
4	Heather Samuel	Antigua and Barbuda	23.34	5
5	Ameerah Bello	Virgin Islands	23.45	4
6	Du Xiujie	China	23.69	3
7	Guilhermina da Cruz	Angola	24.92	8
8	Marina Trandenkova	Russia	DNS	2

Heat five

Rank	Name	Nationality	Time	Lane
1	Galina Malchugina	Russia	22.63	1
2	Chandra Sturrup	Bahamas	22.63	7
3	Beverly McDonald	Jamaica	23.04	6
4	Zhanna Pintusevych	Ukraine	23.15	5
5	Simmone Jacobs	Great Britain	23.36	2
6	Tara Perry	Canada	23.46	3
7	Marina Živković	FR Yugoslavia	23.51	4
8	Kaltouma Nadjina	Chad	24.47	8

Heat six

Rank	Name	Nationality	Time	Lane
1	Marie-José Pérec	France	22.62	5
2	Inger Miller	United States	22.74	3
3	Alenka Bikar	Slovenia	22.88	7
4	Katerina Koffa	Greece	23.09	4
5	Natallia Safronnikava	Belarus	23.14	8
6	Sevatheda Fynes	Bahamas	23.39	2
7	Georgette N’Koma	Cameroon	23.68	1
8	Lyudmila Dmitriady	Uzbekistan	24.88	6

=== Quarterfinals ===
Top four in each heat advanced to the semifinals.

Heat one

Rank	Name	Nationality	Time	Lane
1	Carlette Guidry	United States	22.51	3
2	Chandra Sturrup	Bahamas	22.81	6
3	Melinda Gainsford-Taylor	Australia	22.91	4
4	Natallia Safronnikava	Belarus	23.15	2
5	Sanna Hernesniemi	Finland	23.38	1
6	Monika Gachevska	Bulgaria	23.44	8
7	Ameerah Bello	Virgin Islands	23.66	7
8	Beverly McDonald	Jamaica	DNS	5

Heat two

Rank	Name	Nationality	Time	Lane
1	Merlene Ottey	Jamaica	22.61	4
2	Galina Malchugina	Russia	22.69	3
3	Melanie Paschke	Germany	22.84	5
4	Katerina Koffa	Greece	23.04	7
5	Katharine Merry	Great Britain	23.17	6
6	Sevatheda Fynes	Bahamas	23.26	8
7	Yan Jiankui	China	23.30	1
8	Viktoriya Fomenko	Ukraine	23.44	2

Heat three

Rank	Name	Nationality	Time	Lane
1	Marie-José Pérec	France	22.24	3
2	Mary Onyali	Nigeria	22.37	5
3	Inger Miller	United States	22.57	6
4	Cathy Freeman	Australia	22.74	1
5	Lucrécia Jardim	Portugal	22.88	4
6	Simmone Jacobs	Great Britain	22.96	7
7	Sandy Myers	Spain	23.20	2
8	Heather Samuel	Antigua and Barbuda	23.54	8

Heat four

Rank	Name	Nationality	Time	Lane
1	Dannette Young	United States	22.53	6
2	Juliet Cuthbert	Jamaica	22.62	4
3	Irina Privalova	Russia	22.82	3
4	Alenka Bikar	Slovenia	22.89	5
5	Myra Mayberry	Puerto Rico	23.48	8
6	Patricia Rodríguez	Colombia	23.50	1
7	Calister Ubah	Nigeria	23.62	7
8	Zhanna Pintusevych	Ukraine	23.68	2

=== Semifinals ===
Top four from each heat advanced to the finals.

Heat one

Rank	Name	Nationality	Time	Lane
1	Marie-José Pérec	France	22.07	4
2	Mary Onyali	Nigeria	22.16	3
3	Juliet Cuthbert	Jamaica	22.24	5
4	Inger Miller	United States	22.33	7
5	Dannette Young	United States	22.49	6
6	Cathy Freeman	Australia	22.78	2
7	Natallia Safronnikava	Belarus	22.98	1
8	Irina Privalova	Russia	DNS	8

Heat two

Rank	Name	Nationality	Time	Lane
1	Merlene Ottey	Jamaica	22.08	4
2	Galina Malchugina	Russia	22.35	6
3	Chandra Sturrup	Bahamas	22.54	5
4	Carlette Guidry	United States	22.56	3
5	Melinda Gainsford-Taylor	Australia	22.76	2
6	Melanie Paschke	Germany	22.81	7
7	Alenka Bikar	Slovenia	22.82	8
8	Katerina Koffa	Greece	23.20	1

=== Final ===
Rank	Name	Nationality	Time	Lane
1st place, gold medalist(s)	Marie-José Pérec	France	22.12	3
2nd place, silver medalist(s)	Merlene Ottey	Jamaica	22.24	5
3rd place, bronze medalist(s)	Mary Onyali	Nigeria	22.38	4
4	Inger Miller	United States	22.41	7
5	Galina Malchugina	Russia	22.45	6
6	Chandra Sturrup	Bahamas	22.54	8
7	Juliet Cuthbert	Jamaica	22.60	1
8	Carlette Guidry	United States	22.61	2

Wind in the finals = 0.3 m/s
Notes: DNS = did not start
