= 1996 European Athletics Indoor Championships – Women's 60 metres =

The women's 60 metres event at the 1996 European Athletics Indoor Championships was held in Stockholm Globe Arena on 8–9 March.

== Medalists ==
Gold	Silver	Bronze
Ekaterini Thanou; Greece	Odiah Sidibé; France	Jerneja Perc; Slovenia

== Results ==
=== Heats ===
First 2 from each heat (Q) and the next 2 fastest (q) qualified for the semifinals.

Rank	Heat	Name	Nationality	Time	Notes
1	1	Ekaterini Thanou	Greece	7.21	Q
2	1	Odiah Sidibé	France	7.24	Q
3	4	Natalya Merzlyakova	Russia	7.32	Q
4	2	Bev Kinch	Great Britain	7.35	Q
4	3	Nadezhda Roshchupkina	Russia	7.35	Q
6	3	Alenka Bikar	Slovenia	7.36	Q
7	3	Maria Tsoni	Greece	7.36	q
8	5	Iryna Pukha	Ukraine	7.37	Q
9	2	Jerneja Perc	Slovenia	7.38	Q
10	5	Éva Barati	Hungary	7.41	Q
11	4	Petya Pendareva	Bulgaria	7.43	Q
12	3	Mireille Donders	Switzerland	7.44	q
13	1	Therese Olofsson	Sweden	7.45	
14	2	Carme Blay	Spain	7.46	
15	5	Rahela Markt	Croatia	7.50	
16	4	Zdenka Mušínská	Czech Republic	7.51	
17	4	Geirlaug Geirlaugsdóttir	Iceland	7.54	NR
18	1	Aksel Gürcan	Turkey	7.62	
18	4	Carla Tuzzi	Italy	7.62	
18	5	Maya Azarashvili	Georgia	7.62	
21	5	Rutti Luksepp	Estonia	7.67	
22	2	Riina Suhotskaja	Estonia	7.70	
23	3	Mercedes Martín	Spain	7.71	
24	1	Sunna Gestsdóttír	Iceland	7.79	
	2	Katerina Koffa	Greece	DNS	

=== Semifinals ===
First 3 from each semifinal qualified directly (Q) for the final.

Rank	Heat	Name	Nationality	Time	Notes
1	1	Ekaterini Thanou	Greece	7.18	Q
2	1	Jerneja Perc	Slovenia	7.30	Q
3	2	Odiah Sidibé	France	7.31	Q
4	2	Alenka Bikar	Slovenia	7.31	Q
5	2	Natalya Merzlyakova	Russia	7.31	Q
6	1	Éva Barati	Hungary	7.36	Q
6	2	Maria Tsoni	Greece	7.36	
6	2	Bev Kinch	Great Britain	7.36	
9	1	Iryna Pukha	Ukraine	7.40	
10	1	Nadezhda Roshchupkina	Russia	7.41	
10	2	Petya Pendareva	Bulgaria	7.41	
12	1	Mireille Donders	Switzerland	7.46	

=== Final ===
Rank	Name	Nationality	Time	Notes
1st place, gold medalist(s)	Ekaterini Thanou	Greece	7.15	
2nd place, silver medalist(s)	Odiah Sidibé	France	7.25	
3rd place, bronze medalist(s)	Jerneja Perc	Slovenia	7.28	
4	Natalya Merzlyakova	Russia	7.29	
5	Alenka Bikar	Slovenia	7.32	
6	Éva Barati	Hungary	7.44	
