= Athletics at the 1995 Summer Universiade – Women's 100 metres =

The women's 100 metres event at the 1995 Summer Universiade was held on 31 August – 1 September at the Hakatanomori Athletic Stadium in Fukuoka, Japan.

== Medalists ==
Gold	Silver	Bronze
Melanie Paschke; Germany	Ekaterini Thanou; Greece	Mary Tombiri; Nigeria

== Results ==
=== Heats ===
Qualification: First 4 of each heat (Q) and the next 8 fastest qualified for the quarterfinals.

Wind:
Heat 1: +0.8 m/s, Heat 2: +0.4 m/s, Heat 3: +0.6 m/s, Heat 4: -1.8 m/s, Heat 5: -1.2 m/s, Heat 6: +0.7 m/s

Rank	Heat	Athlete	Nationality	Time	Notes
1	1	Mary Tombiri	Nigeria	11.34	Q
2	1	Ekaterini Thanou	Greece	11.43	Q
2	3	Natalya Anisimova	Russia	11.43	Q
4	3	Heather Samuel	Antigua and Barbuda	11.51	Q
5	3	Sharon Williams	Great Britain	11.53	Q
6	1	Inger Miller	United States	11.54	Q
7	5	Melanie Paschke	Germany	11.56	Q
8	3	Jerneja Perc	Slovenia	11.68	Q
9	4	Frédérique Bangué	France	11.69	Q
10	2	Odile Singa	France	11.71	Q
11	2	Cheryl Taplin	United States	11.71	Q
12	1	N'Deye Binta Dia	Senegal	11.73	Q
13	4	Zhanna Levacheva	Russia	11.78	Q
13	5	Marcia Richardson	Great Britain	11.78	Q
15	2	Iryna Pukha	Ukraine	11.81	Q
16	5	Natalya Vinogradova	Belarus	11.85	Q
17	3	Gabriella Szabó	Hungary	11.87	q
17	6	Toshie Kitada	Japan	11.87	Q
19	5	Patricia Rodríguez	Colombia	11.90	Q
20	5	Kaori Yoshida	Japan	11.91	q
21	4	Amabachukwu Ezem	Nigeria	11.93	Q
22	5	Galina Dikova	Bulgaria	11.94	q
23	3	Liu Shu-Hua	Chinese Taipei	12.00	q
24	1	Sonia Paquette	Canada	12.06	q
25	2	Aksel Gürcan	Turkey	12.10	Q
26	4	Anne Deller	Australia	12.11	Q
27	2	Ameerah Bello	United States Virgin Islands	12.16	q
28	6	Cindy Bousema	South Africa	12.25	Q
29	1	Lisette Rondón	Chile	12.28	q
30	4	Carme Blay	Spain	12.37	q
31	4	Patrina Allen	Jamaica	12.47	
32	6	Thelma Gilbert	Grenada	12.54	Q
33	6	France Gareau	Canada	12.55	Q
34	4	Christophine Harases	Namibia	12.58	
35	2	Veronica Wabukawo	Uganda	12.69	
36	1	Susan Coleman	New Zealand	12.76	
37	5	Louise Ayétotché	Ivory Coast	13.19	
38	3	Ruth Kgnani	Malawi	13.30	
39	2	Nguyen Thi Diem Thuong	Vietnam	13.59	
40	1	Runa Layla	Bangladesh	13.86	
41	5	Magdalena Ansue Nguema	Equatorial Guinea	13.92	
42	3	Edna Nago	Papua New Guinea	14.25	
	6	Wang Huei-Chen	Chinese Taipei	DNS	
	6	Prisca Bruno	Tanzania	DNS	
	6	Ulrike Holzner	Germany	DNS	
	6	Zlatka Georgieva	Bulgaria	DNS	

=== Quarterfinals ===
Qualification: First 4 of each heat qualified directly (Q) for the semifinals.

Wind:
Heat 1: +1.0 m/s, Heat 2: -1.1 m/s, Heat 3: -0.4 m/s, Heat 4: -2.2 m/s

Rank	Heat	Athlete	Nationality	Time	Notes
1	1	Mary Tombiri	Nigeria	11.28	Q
2	3	Melanie Paschke	Germany	11.34	Q
3	2	Ekaterini Thanou	Greece	11.41	Q
4	2	Natalya Anisimova	Russia	11.48	Q
5	1	Heather Samuel	Antigua and Barbuda	11.51	Q
6	2	Marcia Richardson	Great Britain	11.63	Q
7	3	Inger Miller	United States	11.67	Q
8	1	Natalya Vinogradova	Belarus	11.69	Q
9	2	Iryna Pukha	Ukraine	11.74	Q
10	4	Frédérique Bangué	France	11.76	Q
11	3	Zhanna Levacheva	Russia	11.77	Q
12	1	Odile Singa	France	11.78	Q
13	3	Toshie Kitada	Japan	11.83	Q
13	4	Sharon Williams	Great Britain	11.83	Q
15	2	Amabachukwu Ezem	Nigeria	11.87	
16	3	Jerneja Perc	Slovenia	11.89	
17	4	Patricia Rodríguez	Colombia	11.92	Q
18	3	Aksel Gürcan	Turkey	11.93	
18	4	N'Deye Binta Dia	Senegal	11.93	Q
20	1	Gabriella Szabó	Hungary	11.94	
21	1	Kaori Yoshida	Japan	11.95	
22	3	Galina Dikova	Bulgaria	11.96	
23	1	France Gareau	Canada	11.98	
23	4	Cheryl Taplin	United States	11.98	
25	2	Anne Deller	Australia	12.21	
26	1	Carme Blay	Spain	12.23	
26	4	Liu Shu-Hua	Chinese Taipei	12.23	
28	4	Cindy Bousema	South Africa	12.24	
29	4	Sonia Paquette	Canada	12.26	
30	2	Lisette Rondón	Chile	12.29	
31	2	Thelma Gilbert	Grenada	12.61	
	3	Ameerah Bello	United States Virgin Islands	DNS	

=== Semifinals ===
Qualification: First 4 of each semifinal qualified directly (Q) for the final.

Wind:
Heat 1: +0.5 m/s, Heat 2: +1.9 m/s

Rank	Heat	Athlete	Nationality	Time	Notes
1	1	Melanie Paschke	Germany	11.27	Q
1	2	Mary Tombiri	Nigeria	11.27	Q
3	1	Ekaterini Thanou	Greece	11.32	Q
4	2	Natalya Anisimova	Russia	11.50	Q
5	1	Heather Samuel	Antigua and Barbuda	11.51	Q
5	2	Frédérique Bangué	France	11.51	Q
7	2	Sharon Williams	Great Britain	11.62	Q
8	2	Patricia Rodríguez	Colombia	11.63	
9	1	Marcia Richardson	Great Britain	11.65	Q
10	2	Iryna Pukha	Ukraine	11.71	
11	1	Odile Singa	France	11.73	
12	2	Natalya Vinogradova	Belarus	11.74	
13	1	Inger Miller	United States	11.79	
14	2	N'Deye Binta Dia	Senegal	11.81	
15	1	Zhanna Levacheva	Russia	11.83	
16	1	Toshie Kitada	Japan	11.84	

=== Final ===
Wind: -0.7 m/s

Rank	Lane	Athlete	Nationality	Time	Notes
1st place, gold medalist(s)	4	Melanie Paschke	Germany	11.16	
2nd place, silver medalist(s)	6	Ekaterini Thanou	Greece	11.30	
3rd place, bronze medalist(s)	3	Mary Tombiri	Nigeria	11.43	
4	5	Natalya Anisimova	Russia	11.56	
5	7	Heather Samuel	Antigua and Barbuda	11.56	
6	2	Marcia Richardson	Great Britain	11.60	
7	1	Frédérique Bangué	France	11.83	
8	8	Sharon Williams	Great Britain	11.89	
