= 1995 IAAF World Indoor Championships – Women's 200 metres =

The women's 200 metres event at the 1995 IAAF World Indoor Championships was held on 10 March.

== Medalists ==
Gold	Silver	Bronze
Melinda Gainsford; Australia	Pauline Davis; Bahamas	Natalya Voronova; Russia

== Results ==
=== Heats ===
First 2 of each heat (Q) and next 4 fastest (q) qualified for the semifinals.

Rank	Heat	Name	Nationality	Time	Notes
1	1	Melinda Gainsford	Australia	22.64	Q AR
2	1	Natalya Voronova	Russia	23.27	Q
2	2	Silke Lichtenhagen	Germany	23.27	Q
4	2	Pauline Davis	Bahamas	23.29	Q
5	3	Zlatka Georgieva	Bulgaria	23.37	Q
6	4	Carlette Guidry	United States	23.38	Q
7	4	Svetlana Goncharenko	Russia	23.41	Q
8	3	Juliet Cuthbert	Jamaica	23.50	Q
9	1	Maya Azarashvili	Georgia	23.50	q
10	4	Viktoriya Fomenko	Ukraine	23.52	q
11	3	Jacqueline Poelman	Netherlands	23.58	q
12	4	Ekaterini Koffa	Greece	23.59	q
13	1	Fabienne Ficher	France	23.87	
13	2	Hana Benešová	Czech Republic	23.87	
15	4	Sharon Williams	Great Britain	24.28	
16	2	Aksel Gürcan	Turkey	24.36	
17	4	Fabé Dia	France	24.65	
18	3	Donatella Dal Bianco	Italy	24.73	
19	3	Marcela Tiscornia	Uruguay	25.07	
	1	Wendy Vereen	United States	DQ	R141.3
	3	Sanna Hernesniemi	Finland	DNF	
	2	Bernice Morton	Saint Kitts and Nevis	DNS	

=== Semifinals ===
First 3 of each semifinal qualified directly (Q) for the final.

Rank	Heat	Name	Nationality	Time	Notes
1	1	Melinda Gainsford	Australia	22.88	Q
2	1	Natalya Voronova	Russia	22.91	Q
3	2	Pauline Davis	Bahamas	22.94	Q
4	1	Juliet Cuthbert	Jamaica	22.95	Q
5	2	Zlatka Georgieva	Bulgaria	23.03	Q
6	2	Silke Lichtenhagen	Germany	23.11	Q
7	2	Svetlana Goncharenko	Russia	23.16	
8	2	Viktoriya Fomenko	Ukraine	23.47	
9	1	Ekaterini Koffa	Greece	23.82	
10	1	Maya Azarashvili	Georgia	23.88	
11	2	Jacqueline Poelman	Netherlands	24.07	
	1	Carlette Guidry	United States	DNS	

=== Final ===
Rank	Name	Nationality	Time	Notes
1st place, gold medalist(s)	Melinda Gainsford	Australia	22.64	AR=
2nd place, silver medalist(s)	Pauline Davis	Bahamas	22.68	NR
3rd place, bronze medalist(s)	Natalya Voronova	Russia	23.01	
4	Silke Lichtenhagen	Germany	23.23	
5	Zlatka Georgieva	Bulgaria	23.36	
6	Juliet Cuthbert	Jamaica	23.43	
