= 1994 European Athletics Championships – Women's 200 metres =

Women's 200 metres at the European Athletics Championships

These are the official results of the Women's 200 metres event at the 1994 European Championships in Helsinki, Finland, held at Helsinki Olympic Stadium on 10 and 11 August 1994.

== Medalists ==
Gold	Irina Privalova; Russia
Silver	Zhanna Tarnopolskaya; Ukraine
Bronze	Galina Malchugina; Russia

== Results ==
=== Final ===
11 August Wind: 0.2 m/s

Rank	Name	Nationality	Time	Notes
1st place, gold medalist(s)	Irina Privalova	Russia	22.32	
2nd place, silver medalist(s)	Zhanna Tarnopolskaya	Ukraine	22.77	
3rd place, bronze medalist(s)	Galina Malchugina	Russia	22.90	
4	Silke Knoll	Germany	22.99	
5	Maya Azarashvili	Georgia	23.01	
6	Sanna Hernesniemi	Finland	23.24	
7	Lucrécia Jardim	Portugal	23.28	
8	Zlatka Georgieva	Bulgaria	23.46	

=== Semi-finals ===
11 August

==== Semi-final 1 ====
Wind: 0.3 m/s

Rank	Name	Nationality	Time	Notes
1	Silke Knoll	Germany	22.75	Q
2	Galina Malchugina	Russia	22.90	Q
3	Lucrécia Jardim	Portugal	23.25	Q
4	Zlatka Georgieva	Bulgaria	23.36	Q
5	Yekaterina Leshchova	Russia	23.36	
6	Regula Anliker-Aebi	Switzerland	23.50	
7	Viktoriya Fomenko	Ukraine	23.52	
8	Katharine Merry	United Kingdom	23.55	

==== Semi-final 2 ====
Wind: 1.4 m/s

Rank	Name	Nationality	Time	Notes
1	Irina Privalova	Russia	22.61	Q
2	Zhanna Tarnopolskaya	Ukraine	23.01	Q
3	Maya Azarashvili	Georgia	23.24	Q
4	Sanna Hernesniemi	Finland	23.28	Q
5	Erika Suchovská	Czech Republic	23.34	
6	Paula Thomas	United Kingdom	23.41	
7	Silke Lichtenhagen	Germany	23.45	
8	Jacqueline Poelman	Netherlands	23.58	

=== Heats ===
10 August

==== Heat 1 ====
Wind: -2.1 m/s

Rank	Name	Nationality	Time	Notes
1	Zhanna Tarnopolskaya	Ukraine	23.33	Q
2	Lucrécia Jardim	Portugal	23.41	Q
3	Silke Lichtenhagen	Germany	23.42	Q
4	Regula Anliker-Aebi	Switzerland	23.48	q
5	Jacqueline Poelman	Netherlands	23.56	q
6	Simmone Jacobs	United Kingdom	23.75	
7	Maria Staafgård	Sweden	24.09	
8	Karin Solbakken	Norway	24.18	

==== Heat 2 ====
Wind: 0.3 m/s

Rank	Name	Nationality	Time	Notes
1	Galina Malchugina	Russia	23.32	Q
2	Zlatka Georgieva	Bulgaria	23.35	Q
3	Katharine Merry	United Kingdom	23.73	Q
4	Sara Wüest	Switzerland	23.89	
5	Sabine Tröger	Austria	23.91	
6	Anu Pirttimaa	Finland	24.02	
7	Yana Burtasenkova	Moldova	24.37	
8	Antonina Slyusar	Ukraine	24.50	

==== Heat 3 ====
Wind: -0.3 m/s

Rank	Name	Nationality	Time	Notes
1	Irina Privalova	Russia	22.93	Q
2	Maya Azarashvili	Georgia	23.14	Q
3	Sanna Hernesniemi	Finland	23.32	Q
4	Paula Thomas	United Kingdom	23.39	q
5	Giada Gallina	Italy	23.69	
6	Eva Barati	Hungary	23.88	
7	Birgit Rockmeier	Germany	23.89	
8	Dora Kyriacou	Cyprus	24.18	

==== Heat 4 ====
Wind: -1.7 m/s

Rank	Name	Nationality	Time	Notes
1	Silke Knoll	Germany	23.25	Q
2	Erika Suchovská	Czech Republic	23.52	Q
3	Yekaterina Leshchova	Russia	23.59	Q
4	Viktoriya Fomenko	Ukraine	23.67	q
5	Mireille Donders	Switzerland	23.97	
6	Marika Johansson	Sweden	24.05	
7	Tarja Leveelahti	Finland	24.24	
8	Aksel Gürcan	Turkey	24.40	

== Participation ==
According to an unofficial count, 32 athletes from 19 countries participated in the event.

- Austria (1)
- Bulgaria (1)
- Cyprus (1)
- Czech Republic (1)
- Finland (3)
- Georgia (1)
- Germany (3)
- Hungary (1)
- Italy (1)
- Moldova (1)
- Netherlands (1)
- Norway (1)
- Portugal (1)
- Russia (3)
- Sweden (2)
- Switzerland (3)
- Turkey (1)
- Ukraine (3)
- United Kingdom (3)

== See also ==
- 1990 Women's European Championships 200 metres (Split)
- 1991 Women's World Championships 200 metres (Tokyo)
- 1992 Women's Olympic 200 metres (Barcelona)
- 1993 Women's World Championships 200 metres (Stuttgart)
- 1995 Women's World Championships 200 metres (Gothenburg)
- 1996 Women's Olympic 200 metres (Atlanta)
- 1998 Women's European Championships 200 metres (Budapest)
