= 1998 European Athletics Championships – Women's 100 metres =

Women's 100 metres at the 1998 European Athletics Championships
- Venue: Népstadion
- Location: Budapest
- Dates: 18-19 August
- Competitors: 30 from 20 nations
- Winning time: 10.73

Medalists
gold medal	Christine Arron	France
silver medal	Irina Privalova	Russia
bronze medal	Ekaterini Thanou	Greece

The women's 100 metres at the 1998 European Athletics Championships was held at the Népstadion on 18 and 19 August.

== Results ==
KEY:	q	Fastest non-qualifiers	Q	Qualified	NR	National record	PB	Personal best	SB	Seasonal best

=== Round 1 ===
Qualification: First 3 in each heat (Q) and the next 4 fastest (q) advance to the Semifinals.

Rank	Heat	Name	Nationality	Time	Notes
1	4	Ekaterini Thanou	Greece	11.04	Q, NR
2	1	Zhanna Pintusevich	Ukraine	11.06	Q
3	3	Christine Arron	France	11.12	Q
4	4	Melanie Paschke	Germany	11.17	Q
5	2	Irina Privalova	Russia	11.22	Q
6	2	Petya Pendareva	Bulgaria	11.24	Q
7	4	Nora Ivanova	Bulgaria	11.25	Q, PB
8	4	Joice Maduaka	Great Britain	11.35	q, PB
9	1	Oksana Ekk	Russia	11.39	Q
10	1	Frédérique Bangué	France	11.41	Q
11	4	Sanna Kyllönen	Finland	11.42	q
12	1	Lucrécia Jardim	Portugal	11.47	q
13	2	Odiah Sidibé	France	11.49	Q
14	1	Birgit Rockmeier	Germany	11.50	q
15	2	Kim Gevaert	Belgium	11.53	
16	3	Natallia Safronnikava	Belarus	11.55	Q
17	3	Anzhela Kravchenko	Ukraine	11.59	Q
18	4	Saša Prokofjev	Slovenia	11.65	
19	2	Marit Nyberg-Birknes	Norway	11.67	
20	1	Aksel Gürcan	Turkey	11.68	
21	3	Natalya Ignatova	Russia	11.73	
22	2	Iryna Pukha	Ukraine	11.74	
23	3	Pavlina Vostatkova	Czech Republic	11.80	
24	2	Agnė Visockaitė	Lithuania	11.85	
24	3	Silke Lichtenhagen	Germany	11.85	
24	4	Rahela Markt	Croatia	11.85	
27	1	Éva Barati	Hungary	11.92	
28	3	Johanna Manninen	Finland	11.94	
29	2	Vukosava Đapić	Yugoslavia	11.95	
30	1	Tamara Shanidze	Georgia	12.04	

=== Semifinals ===
Qualification: First 4 in each heat (Q) advance to the Final.

Rank	Heat	Name	Nationality	Time	Notes
1	1	Christine Arron	France	10.81	Q, CR
2	2	Ekaterini Thanou	Greece	10.92	Q, NR
3	1	Zhanna Pintusevich	Ukraine	11.00	Q, SB
4	2	Irina Privalova	Russia	11.02	Q, SB
5	1	Petya Pendareva	Bulgaria	11.16	Q
5	2	Melanie Paschke	Germany	11.16	Q
7	1	Frédérique Bangué	France	11.20	Q
8	1	Oksana Ekk	Russia	11.21	PB
9	2	Anzhela Kravchenko	Ukraine	11.23	Q
9	2	Nora Ivanova	Bulgaria	11.23	PB
11	2	Natallia Safronnikava	Belarus	11.32	
12	2	Odiah Sidibé	France	11.33	
13	1	Sanna Kyllönen	Finland	11.45	
14	1	Joice Maduaka	Great Britain	11.49	
14	2	Lucrécia Jardim	Portugal	11.49	
16	1	Birgit Rockmeier	Germany	11.50	

=== Final ===
Rank	Name	Nationality	Time	Notes
1st place, gold medalist(s)	Christine Arron	France	10.73	AR
2nd place, silver medalist(s)	Irina Privalova	Russia	10.83	SB
3rd place, bronze medalist(s)	Ekaterini Thanou	Greece	10.87	NR
4	Zhanna Pintusevich	Ukraine	10.92	SB
5	Melanie Paschke	Germany	11.07	SB
6	Petya Pendareva	Bulgaria	11.12	PB
7	Anzhela Kravchenko	Ukraine	11.16	PB
8	Frédérique Bangué	France	11.27	
