= 1998 European Athletics Indoor Championships – Women's 60 metres =

The women's 60 metres event at the 1998 European Athletics Indoor Championships was held 27–28 February.

== Medalists ==
Gold	Silver	Bronze
Melanie Paschke; Germany	Frédérique Bangué; France	Odiah Sidibé; France

== Results ==
=== Heats ===
First 4 from each heat (Q) and the next 4 fastest (q) qualified for the semifinals.

Rank	Heat	Name	Nationality	Time	Notes
1	3	Frédérique Bangué	France	7.16	Q
2	2	Andrea Philipp	Germany	7.20	Q
3	3	Irina Pukha	Ukraine	7.21	Q
4	2	Katerina Koffa	Greece	7.22	Q
5	1	Melanie Paschke	Germany	7.23	Q
6	1	Ekaterini Thanou	Greece	7.27	Q
7	3	Alenka Bikar	Slovenia	7.28	Q
8	3	Manuela Levorato	Italy	7.29	Q
9	2	Petya Pendareva	Bulgaria	7.30	Q
10	1	Anzhela Kravchenko	Ukraine	7.32	Q
11	1	Annika Amundin	Sweden	7.33	Q
12	2	Joice Maduaka	Great Britain	7.34	Q
13	1	Odiah Sidibé	France	7.35	q
13	2	Sandra Citte	France	7.35	q
15	1	Carmen Blay	Spain	7.36	q
16	3	Saša Prokofjev	Slovenia	7.40	q
17	2	Karin Mayr	Austria	7.42	
18	3	Katleen De Caluwé	Belgium	7.44	
19	2	Lena Barry	Ireland	7.48	
20	3	Maria Tsoni	Greece	7.49	
21	1	Aksel Gürcan	Turkey	7.54	
22	1	Tamara Shanidze	Georgia	7.63	

=== Semifinals ===
First 4 from each semifinal qualified directly (Q) for the final.

Rank	Heat	Name	Nationality	Time	Notes
1	2	Melanie Paschke	Germany	7.17	Q
2	1	Odiah Sidibé	France	7.22	Q
3	1	Katerina Koffa	Greece	7.24	Q
4	1	Irina Pukha	Ukraine	7.25	Q
4	1	Andrea Philipp	Germany	7.25	Q
4	2	Frédérique Bangué	France	7.25	Q
7	1	Manuela Levorato	Italy	7.26	
8	1	Petya Pendareva	Bulgaria	7.27	
9	2	Ekaterini Thanou	Greece	7.31	Q
10	2	Alenka Bikar	Slovenia	7.31	Q
11	2	Carmen Blay	Spain	7.35	
12	2	Anzhela Kravchenko	Ukraine	7.35	
13	2	Annika Amundin	Sweden	7.37	
14	1	Saša Prokofjev	Slovenia	7.39	
15	1	Joice Maduaka	Great Britain	7.43	
	2	Sandra Citte	France	DNS	

=== Final ===
Rank	Name	Nationality	Time	Notes
1st place, gold medalist(s)	Melanie Paschke	Germany	7.14	
2nd place, silver medalist(s)	Frédérique Bangué	France	7.18	
3rd place, bronze medalist(s)	Odiah Sidibé	France	7.22	
4	Ekaterini Thanou	Greece	7.23	
5	Katerina Koffa	Greece	7.24	
6	Irina Pukha	Ukraine	7.28	
7	Andrea Philipp	Germany	7.28	
8	Alenka Bikar	Slovenia	7.40	
