= 1997 IAAF World Indoor Championships – Women's 60 metres =

The women's 60 metres event at the 1997 IAAF World Indoor Championships was held on March 7.

== Medalists ==
Gold	Silver	Bronze
Gail Devers; United States	Chandra Sturrup; Bahamas	Frédérique Bangué; France

== Results ==
=== Heats ===
First two of each heat (Q) and next 4 fastest (q) qualified for the semifinals.

Rank	Heat	Name	Nationality	Time	Notes
1	7	Chandra Sturrup	Bahamas	7.18	Q, PB
2	6	Gail Devers	United States	7.21	Q
3	4	Frédérique Bangué	France	7.24	Q
4	1	Ekaterini Thanou	Greece	7.27	Q
4	2	Irina Privalova	Russia	7.27	Q
4	3	Chioma Ajunwa	Nigeria	7.27	Q
4	5	Odiah Sidibé	France	7.27	Q
8	1	Marcia Richardson	Great Britain	7.29	Q, PB
8	6	Endurance Ojokolo	Nigeria	7.29	Q
10	7	Nadezhda Roshchupkina	Russia	7.30	Q
11	7	Maria Tsoni	Greece	7.32	q, PB
12	2	Jerneja Perc	Slovenia	7.33	Q
13	6	Sanna Hernesniemi	Finland	7.34	q
14	4	Aleisha Latimer	United States	7.38	Q
15	3	Eldece Clarke	Bahamas	7.39	Q
15	5	Hanitriniaina Rakotondrabe	Madagascar	7.39	Q
17	7	Sylvie Mballa Éloundou	Cameroon	7.41	q
18	3	Beverly Kinch	Great Britain	7.42	q
19	1	Saša Prokofijev	Slovenia	7.43	
20	5	Karin Knoll	Austria	7.44	
21	2	Anzhela Kravchenko	Ukraine	7.47	
21	4	Kim Gevaert	Belgium	7.47	
23	6	Sandrine Hennart	Belgium	7.51	
24	6	Elena Sordelli	Italy	7.57	
25	7	Ameerah Bello	United States Virgin Islands	7.60	
26	2	Tatiana Orcy	Brazil	7.62	
27	2	Giada Gallina	Italy	7.64	
27	6	Éva Barati	Hungary	7.64	
29	4	Elena Bobrovskaya	Kyrgyzstan	7.66	
30	4	Christina Schnohr	Denmark	7.70	
31	3	Aksel Gürcan	Turkey	7.71	
31	5	Laure Kuetey	Benin	7.71	
33	1	Elma Posadas	Philippines	7.73	
34	5	Deirdre Caruana	Malta	8.06	
35	7	Agnes Khafaja	Lebanon	8.35	
	1	Merlene Frazer	Jamaica	DNS	
	3	Michelle Freeman	Jamaica	DNS	
	3	Heather Samuel	Antigua and Barbuda	DNS	

=== Semifinals ===
First 2 of each semifinal (Q) qualified directly for the final.

Rank	Heat	Name	Nationality	Time	Notes
1	1	Irina Privalova	Russia	7.08	Q
2	3	Chandra Sturrup	Bahamas	7.10	Q, PB
3	3	Chioma Ajunwa	Nigeria	7.12	Q
4	1	Gail Devers	United States	7.15	Q
5	1	Ekaterini Thanou	Greece	7.15	=NR
6	2	Frédérique Bangué	France	7.16	Q
7	3	Odiah Sidibé	France	7.20	
8	2	Endurance Ojokolo	Nigeria	7.24	Q
9	1	Jerneja Perc	Slovenia	7.28	
9	3	Hanitriniaina Rakotondrabe	Madagascar	7.28	PB
11	2	Nadezhda Roshchupkina	Russia	7.29	
12	2	Marcia Richardson	Great Britain	7.30	
13	2	Maria Tsoni	Greece	7.32	
13	3	Aleisha Latimer	United States	7.32	
15	2	Sanna Hernesniemi	Finland	7.39	
16	3	Beverly Kinch	Great Britain	7.41	
17	1	Eldece Clarke	Bahamas	7.49	
18	1	Sylvie Mballa Éloundou	Cameroon	7.50	

=== Final ===
Rank	Lane	Name	Nationality	Time	Notes
1st place, gold medalist(s)	2	Gail Devers	United States	7.06	
2nd place, silver medalist(s)	4	Chandra Sturrup	Bahamas	7.15	
3rd place, bronze medalist(s)	5	Frédérique Bangué	France	7.17	
4	6	Chioma Ajunwa	Nigeria	7.19	
5	1	Endurance Ojokolo	Nigeria	7.38	
6	3	Irina Privalova	Russia	7.88	
