= Athletics at the 1995 Summer Universiade – Women's 200 metres =

The women's 200 metres event at the 1995 Summer Universiade was held on 29–30 August at the Hakatanomori Athletic Stadium in Fukuoka, Japan.

== Medalists ==
Gold	Silver	Bronze
Du Xiujie; China	Oksana Dyachenko; Russia	Zlatka Georgieva; Bulgaria

== Results ==
=== Heats ===
Qualification: First 4 of each heat (Q) and the next 8 fastest (q) qualified for the quarterfinals.

Wind:
Heat 1: +0.2 m/s, Heat 2: +0.7 m/s, Heat 3: +2.0 m/s, Heat 4: +2.1 m/s, Heat 5: +0.8 m/s, Heat 6: +0.8 m/s

Rank	Heat	Athlete	Nationality	Time	Notes
1	4	Zlatka Georgieva	Bulgaria	23.23	Q
2	5	Oksana Dyachenko	Russia	23.34	Q
3	5	Aspen Burkett	United States	23.39	Q
4	1	Kenya Walton	United States	23.44	Q
5	6	Maguy Nestoret	France	23.50	Q
6	4	Du Xiujie	China	23.52	Q
7	3	Natalya Vinogradova	Belarus	23.54	Q
8	1	Monika Gachevska	Bulgaria	23.57	Q
9	2	Patricia Rodríguez	Colombia	23.61	Q
10	6	Catherine Murphy	Great Britain	23.66	Q
11	6	Viktoriya Fomenko	Ukraine	23.73	Q
12	3	Joice Maduaka	Great Britain	23.81	Q
13	5	Vida Nsiah	Ghana	23.88	
14	2	Heather Samuel	Antigua and Barbuda	23.92	Q
15	4	France Gareau	Canada	24.07	Q
16	3	Natalya Khrushcheleva	Russia	24.12	Q
17	2	Ameerah Bello	United States Virgin Islands	24.13	Q
18	1	Aksel Gürcan	Turkey	24.16	Q
19	1	Yuka Fujii	Japan	24.20	Q
20	5	Marie-Joëlle Dogbo	France	24.24	Q
21	1	LaDonna Antoine	Canada	24.31	q
22	3	Cindy Bousema	South Africa	24.32	Q
23	6	Zoila Stewart	Costa Rica	24.33	Q
24	6	Gabriella Szabó	Hungary	24.36	q
25	2	Wang Huei-Chen	Chinese Taipei	24.45	Q
26	4	Makiko Yamada	Japan	24.46	Q
27	5	Louise Ayétotché	Ivory Coast	24.51	q
28	5	Alinah Mogotsi	South Africa	24.58	q
29	4	Kao Yuh-Chuan	Chinese Taipei	24.67	q
30	3	Elvira Dzhabarova	Azerbaijan	24.84	q
31	4	Lisette Rondón	Chile	24.88	q
32	6	Guilhermina da Cruz	Angola	25.30	q
33	6	Christophine Harases	Namibia	25.49	
34	3	Susan Coleman	New Zealand	25.50	
35	2	Veronica Wabukawo	Uganda	25.70	
36	3	Choi Hiu Nam	Hong Kong	26.55	
37	4	Thelma Gilbert	Grenada	26.69	
38	5	Rosa Evora	El Salvador	27.87	
39	1	Runa Layla	Bangladesh	29.13	
40	1	Edna Nago	Papua New Guinea	29.60	
	1	Faith Idehen	Nigeria	DNS	
	2	Myriam Léonie Mani	Cameroon	DNS	
	2	Elena Bobrovskaya	Kyrgyzstan	DNS	
	4	Mary Tombiri	Nigeria	DNS	

=== Quarterfinals ===
Qualification: First 4 of each heat qualified directly (Q) for the semifinals.

Wind:
Heat 1: +0.1 m/s, Heat 2: -0.5 m/s, Heat 3: -0.1 m/s, Heat 4: +0.6 m/s

Rank	Heat	Athlete	Nationality	Time	Notes
1	3	Zlatka Georgieva	Bulgaria	23.26	Q
2	2	Oksana Dyachenko	Russia	23.36	Q
3	4	Maguy Nestoret	France	23.38	Q
4	3	Du Xiujie	China	23.42	Q
5	2	Aspen Burkett	United States	23.52	Q
6	3	Patricia Rodríguez	Colombia	23.53	Q
7	4	Natalya Vinogradova	Belarus	23.63	Q
8	1	Monika Gachevska	Bulgaria	23.66	Q
9	2	Wang Huei-Chen	Chinese Taipei	23.70	Q
10	2	Catherine Murphy	Great Britain	23.77	Q
11	4	Viktoriya Fomenko	Ukraine	23.78	Q
12	1	Kenya Walton	United States	23.82	Q
13	4	Heather Samuel	Antigua and Barbuda	23.87	Q
14	3	Ameerah Bello	United States Virgin Islands	23.97	Q
15	1	Joice Maduaka	Great Britain	24.07	Q
16	3	Natalya Khrushcheleva	Russia	24.16	
17	1	Marie-Joëlle Dogbo	France	24.17	Q
18	1	Vida Nsiah	Ghana	24.17	
19	2	France Gareau	Canada	24.26	
20	1	Zoila Stewart	Costa Rica	24.38	
20	3	LaDonna Antoine	Canada	24.38	
22	2	Aksel Gürcan	Turkey	24.45	
23	4	Yuka Fujii	Japan	24.59	
24	1	Alinah Mogotsi	South Africa	24.64	
25	2	Gabriella Szabó	Hungary	24.67	
26	4	Cindy Bousema	South Africa	24.69	
27	3	Makiko Yamada	Japan	24.74	
28	4	Louise Ayétotché	Ivory Coast	24.83	
29	4	Kao Yuh-Chuan	Chinese Taipei	24.85	
30	2	Lisette Rondón	Chile	24.90	
31	3	Guilhermina da Cruz	Angola	25.50	
	1	Elvira Dzhabarova	Azerbaijan	DNF	

=== Semifinals ===
Qualification: First 4 of each semifinal qualified directly (Q) for the final.

Wind:
Heat 1: -0.7 m/s, Heat 2: +1.7 m/s

Rank	Heat	Athlete	Nationality	Time	Notes
1	1	Du Xiujie	China	23.24	Q
2	2	Oksana Dyachenko	Russia	23.26	Q
3	1	Zlatka Georgieva	Bulgaria	23.42	Q
4	1	Kenya Walton	United States	23.44	Q
4	2	Monika Gachevska	Bulgaria	23.44	Q
6	1	Patricia Rodríguez	Colombia	23.45	Q
7	1	Natalya Vinogradova	Belarus	23.45	
8	2	Aspen Burkett	United States	23.59	Q
9	2	Maguy Nestoret	France	23.60	Q
10	2	Catherine Murphy	Great Britain	23.74	
11	1	Viktoriya Fomenko	Ukraine	23.79	
12	2	Wang Huei-Chen	Chinese Taipei	23.95	
13	2	Ameerah Bello	United States Virgin Islands	24.07	
14	1	Marie-Joëlle Dogbo	France	24.93	
15	1	Joice Maduaka	Great Britain	25.08	
	2	Heather Samuel	Antigua and Barbuda	DNS	

=== Final ===
Wind: +1.7 m/s

Rank	Lane	Athlete	Nationality	Time	Notes
1st place, gold medalist(s)	4	Du Xiujie	China	22.53	
2nd place, silver medalist(s)	5	Oksana Dyachenko	Russia	22.89	
3rd place, bronze medalist(s)	6	Zlatka Georgieva	Bulgaria	23.04	
4	2	Aspen Burkett	United States	23.06	
5	8	Maguy Nestoret	France	23.23	
6	1	Patricia Rodríguez	Colombia	23.41	
7	3	Monika Gachevska	Bulgaria	23.46	
8	7	Kenya Walton	United States	23.46	
