= 1996 European Athletics Indoor Championships – Women's 200 metres =

The women's 200 metres event at the 1996 European Athletics Indoor Championships was held in Stockholm Globe Arena on 9–10 March.

== Medalists ==
| Gold | Silver | Bronze |
|---|---|---|
| Sandra Myers; Spain | Erika Suchovská; Czech Republic | Zlatka Georgieva; Bulgaria |

== Results ==
=== Heats ===
The winner of each heat (Q) and the next 6 fastest (q) qualified for the semifinals.

| Rank | Heat | Name | Nationality | Time | Notes |
|---|---|---|---|---|---|
| 1 | 1 | Erika Suchovská | Czech Republic | 23.26 | Q |
| 2 | 1 | Nora Ivanova | Bulgaria | 23.43 | q |
| 3 | 4 | Zlatka Georgieva | Bulgaria | 23.68 | Q |
| 4 | 6 | Sandra Myers | Spain | 23.71 | Q |
| 5 | 5 | Fabé Dia | France | 23.77 | Q |
| 6 | 6 | Alenka Bikar | Slovenia | 23.85 | q |
| 7 | 2 | Christine Arron | France | 23.88 | Q |
| 8 | 5 | Maya Azarashvili | Georgia | 23.91 | q |
| 9 | 2 | Marina Zhirova | Russia | 24.00 | q |
| 10 | 4 | Agnė Visockaitė | Lithuania | 24.04 | q |
| 11 | 6 | Mireille Donders | Switzerland | 24.05 | q |
| 12 | 1 | Marina Vasarmidou | Greece | 24.31 | |
| 12 | 4 | Mercedes Martín | Spain | 24.31 | |
| 13 | 3 | Monika Gachevska | Bulgaria | 24.40 | Q |
| 14 | 5 | Éva Barati | Hungary | 24.74 | |
| 15 | 5 | Aksel Gürcan | Turkey | 24.84 | |
| 16 | 3 | Virna De Angeli | Italy | 26.49 | |
| | 3 | Katerina Koffa | Greece | DQ | |
| | 2 | Öznur Dursun | Turkey | DNS | |
| | 6 | Rutti Luksepp | Estonia | DNS | |

=== Semifinals ===
The winner of each semifinal (Q) and the next 1 fastest (q) qualified for the final. The following 4 fastest qualified for the B final.

| Rank | Heat | Name | Nationality | Time | Notes |
|---|---|---|---|---|---|
| 1 | 1 | Sandra Myers | Spain | 23.21 | Q |
| 2 | 3 | Erika Suchovská | Czech Republic | 23.39 | Q |
| 3 | 3 | Alenka Bikar | Slovenia | 23.54 | q |
| 4 | 2 | Zlatka Georgieva | Bulgaria | 23.58 | Q |
| 5 | 1 | Fabé Dia | France | 23.73 | qB |
| 6 | 1 | Marina Zhirova | Russia | 23.81 | qB |
| 7 | 2 | Christine Arron | France | 23.89 | qB |
| 8 | 2 | Maya Azarashvili | Georgia | 24.12 | qB |
| 9 | 3 | Mireille Donders | Switzerland | 24.13 | |
| 10 | 2 | Agnė Visockaitė | Lithuania | 24.17 | |
| 11 | 3 | Monika Gachevska | Bulgaria | 24.22 | |
| | 1 | Nora Ivanova | Bulgaria | DQ | |

=== Final ===
| Rank | Name | Nationality | Time | Notes |
|---|---|---|---|---|
| 1st place, gold medalist(s) | Sandra Myers | Spain | 23.15 | |
| 2nd place, silver medalist(s) | Erika Suchovská | Czech Republic | 23.16 | PB |
| 3rd place, bronze medalist(s) | Zlatka Georgieva | Bulgaria | 23.40 | |
| 4 | Alenka Bikar | Slovenia | 23.68 | |

==== B final ====
| Rank | Name | Nationality | Time | Notes |
|---|---|---|---|---|
| 1 | Marina Zhirova | Russia | 23.72 | |
| 2 | Christine Arron | France | 23.74 | |
| 3 | Fabé Dia | France | 24.04 | |
| 4 | Maya Azarashvili | Georgia | 24.06 | |
