= 1995 World Championships in Athletics – Women's 200 metres =

These are the official results of the Women's 200 metres event at the 1995 IAAF World Championships in Gothenburg, Sweden. There were a total number of 37 participating athletes, with two semi-finals and five qualifying heats and the final held on Thursday 1995-08-10.

== Final ==
| RANK | FINAL Wind: -2.2 | TIME |
|---|---|---|
| | Merlene Ottey (JAM) | 22.12 |
| | Irina Privalova (RUS) | 22.12 |
| | Galina Malchugina (RUS) | 22.37 |
| 4. | Melanie Paschke (GER) | 22.60 |
| 5. | Silke Knoll (GER) | 22.66 |
| 6. | Mary Onyali (NGR) | 22.71 |
| 7. | Marina Trandenkova (RUS) | 22.84 |
| — | Gwen Torrence (USA) | DQ |

- Torrence ran a time of 21.77, but was disqualified due to a lane violation.

== Semi-finals ==
- Held on Thursday 1995-08-10

| RANK | HEAT 1 Wind: +2.3 | TIME |
|---|---|---|
| 1. | Irina Privalova (RUS) | 22.18w |
| 2. | Gwen Torrence (USA) | 22.25w |
| 3. | Mary Onyali (NGR) | 22.58w |
| 4. | Melanie Paschke (GER) | 22.60w |
| 5. | Melinda Gainsford-Taylor (AUS) | 22.61w |
| 6. | Beverly McDonald (JAM) | 22.91w |
| 7. | Petya Pendareva (BUL) | 22.92w |
| 8. | Paula Thomas (GBR) | 23.03w |

| RANK | HEAT 2 Wind: -0.7 | TIME |
|---|---|---|
| 1. | Merlene Ottey (JAM) | 22.25 |
| 2. | Galina Malchugina (RUS) | 22.45 |
| 3. | Silke Knoll (GER) | 22.57 |
| 4. | Marina Trandenkova (RUS) | 22.71 |
| 5. | Cathy Freeman (AUS) | 22.82 |
| 6. | Carlette Guidry-White (USA) | 22.91 |
| 7. | Zlatka Georgieva (BUL) | 22.98 |
| 8. | Celena Mondie-Milner (USA) | 23.33 |

== Qualifying heats ==
- Held on Wednesday 1995-08-09

| RANK | HEAT 1 Wind: +0.7 | TIME |
|---|---|---|
| 1. | Merlene Ottey (JAM) | 22.55 |
| 2. | Marina Trandenkova (RUS) | 22.69 |
| 3. | Carlette Guidry-White (USA) | 22.71 |
| 4. | Erika Suchovska (CZE) | 23.13 |
| 5. | Viktoriya Fomenko (UKR) | 23.18 |
| 6. | Heather Samuel (ATG) | 23.64 |
| 7. | Wang Huei-Chen (TPE) | 23.77 |

| RANK | HEAT 2 Wind: -0.2 | TIME |
|---|---|---|
| 1. | Mary Onyali (NGR) | 22.59 |
| 2. | Celena Mondie-Milner (USA) | 22.90 |
| 3. | Cathy Freeman (AUS) | 22.90 |
| 4. | Zhanna Tarnopolskaya-Pintusevich (UKR) | 23.30 |
| 5. | Patricia Rodríguez (COL) | 23.67 |
| 6. | Nora Ivanova (BUL) | 23.98 |
| 7. | Nadjina Kaltouma (CHA) | 24.57 |
| — | Susanthika Jayasinghe (SRI) | DQ |

| RANK | HEAT 3 Wind: -0.5 | TIME |
|---|---|---|
| 1. | Irina Privalova (RUS) | 22.23 |
| 2. | Silke Knoll (GER) | 22.46 |
| 3. | Paula Thomas (GBR) | 22.95 |
| 4. | Petya Pendareva (BUL) | 22.96 |
| 5. | Sevatheda Fynes (BAH) | 23.01 |
| 6. | Maguy Nestoret (FRA) | 23.16 |
| — | Heide Seyerling (RSA) | DQ |

| RANK | HEAT 4 Wind: +0.0 | TIME |
|---|---|---|
| 1. | Galina Malchugina (RUS) | 22.46 |
| 2. | Melinda Gainsford-Taylor (AUS) | 22.71 |
| 3. | Silke Lichtenhagen (GER) | 23.19 |
| 4. | Sanna Hernesniemi-Kyllönen (FIN) | 23.20 |
| 5. | Natalya Vinogradova-Safronnikova (BLR) | 23.33 |
| 6. | Debbie Ferguson (BAH) | 23.33 |
| 7. | Dora Kyriakou (CYP) | 23.77 |
| 8. | Marcela Tiscornia (URU) | 24.39 |

| RANK | HEAT 5 Wind: +0.7 | TIME |
|---|---|---|
| 1. | Gwen Torrence (USA) | 22.61 |
| 2. | Beverly McDonald (JAM) | 22.74 |
| 3. | Melanie Paschke (GER) | 22.81 |
| 4. | Zlatka Georgieva (BUL) | 22.95 |
| 5. | Ekaterini Koffa (GRE) | 23.16 |
| 6. | Maya Azarashvili (GEO) | 23.18 |
| 7. | Damayanthi Dharsha-Kobalavithanage (SRI) | 23.45 |
