= 1998 European Athletics Championships – Women's 200 metres =

Women's 200 metres at the European Athletics Championships

The women's 200 metres at the 1998 European Athletics Championships was held at the Népstadion on 20 and 21 August.

== Medalists ==
| Gold | Irina Privalova; Russia |
| Silver | Zhanna Pintusevich; Ukraine |
| Bronze | Melanie Paschke; Germany |

== Results ==
| KEY: | q | Fastest non-qualifiers | Q | Qualified | NR | National record | PB | Personal best | SB | Seasonal best |

=== Round 1 ===
Qualification: First 3 in each heat (Q) and the next 4 fastest (q) advance to the Semifinals.

| Rank | Heat | Name | Nationality | Time | Notes |
|---|---|---|---|---|---|
| 1 | 4 | Nora Ivanova | Bulgaria | 22.91 | Q, SB |
| 2 | 2 | Zhanna Pintusevich | Ukraine | 23.02 | Q |
| 3 | 4 | Svetlana Goncharenko | Russia | 23.06 | Q |
| 4 | 2 | Katharine Merry | Great Britain | 23.23 | Q |
| 5 | 2 | Lucrécia Jardim | Portugal | 23.24 | Q |
| 5 | 4 | Ekaterini Koffa | Greece | 23.24 | Q |
| 7 | 4 | Kim Gevaert | Belgium | 23.27 | q |
| 8 | 3 | Natallia Safronnikava | Belarus | 23.29 | Q, SB |
| 8 | 2 | Gabi Rockmeier | Germany | 23.29 | q |
| 10 | 1 | Natalya Voronova | Russia | 23.32 | Q |
| 10 | 4 | Alenka Bikar | Slovenia | 23.32 | q |
| 12 | 3 | Irina Privalova | Russia | 23.34 | Q |
| 13 | 3 | Melanie Paschke | Germany | 23.43 | Q |
| 13 | 4 | Fabe Dia | France | 23.43 | q |
| 15 | 2 | Monika Gachevska | Bulgaria | 23.50 | |
| 16 | 4 | Tetyana Lukyanenko | Ukraine | 23.51 | |
| 17 | 1 | Sabrina Mulrain | Germany | 23.53 | Q |
| 18 | 2 | Natallia Solohub | Belarus | 23.54 | |
| 19 | 1 | Erika Suchovská | Czech Republic | 23.56 | Q |
| 20 | 3 | Kinga Leszczyńska | Poland | 23.59 | |
| 21 | 3 | Katia Benth | France | 23.69 | |
| 22 | 4 | Sanna Kyllönen | Finland | 23.70 | SB |
| 23 | 1 | Delphine Combe | France | 23.82 | |
| 24 | 3 | Pavlina Vostatkova | Czech Republic | 23.98 | |
| 25 | 1 | Manuela Levorato | Italy | 24.01 | |
| 26 | 2 | Hana Benešová | Czech Republic | 24.04 | |
| 27 | 1 | Johanna Manninen | Finland | 24.10 | |
| 28 | 1 | Sarah Wilhelmy | Great Britain | 24.11 | |
| 29 | 3 | Vukosava Đapić | Yugoslavia | 24.33 | |
| 30 | 3 | Enikő Szabó | Hungary | 24.39 | |
| 31 | 2 | Rahela Markt | Croatia | 24.77 | |
| 32 | 1 | Tamara Shanidze | Georgia | 24.91 | |

=== Semifinals ===
Qualification: First 4 in each heat (Q) advance to the Final.

| Rank | Heat | Name | Nationality | Time | Notes |
|---|---|---|---|---|---|
| 1 | 2 | Zhanna Pintusevich | Ukraine | 22.92 | Q |
| 2 | 2 | Irina Privalova | Russia | 23.02 | Q |
| 3 | 1 | Natalya Voronova | Russia | 23.09 | Q |
| 4 | 2 | Melanie Paschke | Germany | 23.14 | Q |
| 5 | 1 | Nora Ivanova | Bulgaria | 23.26 | Q |
| 6 | 2 | Gabi Rockmeier | Germany | 23.36 | Q |
| 7 | 2 | Katharine Merry | Great Britain | 23.38 | |
| 8 | 1 | Sabrina Mulrain | Germany | 23.39 | Q |
| 9 | 2 | Alenka Bikar | Slovenia | 23.42 | |
| 10 | 1 | Erika Suchovská | Czech Republic | 23.43 | Q |
| 11 | 1 | Svetlana Goncharenko | Russia | 23.44 | |
| 12 | 1 | Lucrécia Jardim | Portugal | 23.47 | |
| 13 | 2 | Natallia Safronnikava | Belarus | 23.60 | |
| 14 | 1 | Fabe Dia | France | 23.66 | |
| 15 | 2 | Ekaterini Koffa | Greece | 23.68 | |
| 16 | 1 | Kim Gevaert | Belgium | 23.74 | |

=== Final ===
| Rank | Name | Nationality | Time | Notes |
|---|---|---|---|---|
| 1st place, gold medalist(s) | Irina Privalova | Russia | 22.62 | SB |
| 2nd place, silver medalist(s) | Zhanna Pintusevich | Ukraine | 22.74 | |
| 3rd place, bronze medalist(s) | Melanie Paschke | Germany | 22.78 | |
| 4 | Natalya Voronova | Russia | 22.80 | |
| 5 | Nora Ivanova | Bulgaria | 23.02 | |
| 6 | Sabrina Mulrain | Germany | 23.04 | |
| 7 | Gabi Rockmeier | Germany | 23.08 | |
| 8 | Erika Suchovská | Czech Republic | 23.18 | |
