= 1998 European Athletics Indoor Championships – Women's 200 metres =

The women's 200 metres event at the 1998 European Athletics Indoor Championships was held 28 February–1 March.

== Medalists ==
Gold	Silver	Bronze
Svetlana Goncharenko; Russia	Melanie Paschke; Germany	Katerina Koffa; Greece

== Results ==
=== Heats ===
First 2 from each heat (Q) and the next 5 fastest (q) qualified for the semifinals.

Rank	Heat	Name	Nationality	Time	Notes
1	4	Svetlana Goncharenko	Russia	22.86	Q
2	5	Melanie Paschke	Germany	22.88	Q
3	3	Katerina Koffa	Greece	22.90	Q
4	2	Mireille Donders	Switzerland	22.96	Q, NR
5	1	Birgit Rockmeier	Germany	23.05	Q
6	1	Natalya Voronova	Russia	23.11	Q
7	2	Sylviane Félix	France	23.18	Q
8	4	Lucrécia Jardim	Portugal	23.21	Q, NR
9	1	Karin Mayr	Austria	23.22	q
10	5	Donna Fraser	Great Britain	23.32	Q
11	5	Fabé Dia	France	23.35	q
12	3	Fabienne Ficher	France	23.41	Q
13	4	Alenka Bikar	Slovenia	23.51	q
14	3	Monika Gachevska	Bulgaria	23.72	q
15	3	Kinga Leszczyńska	Poland	24.17	q
16	1	Petya Pendareva	Bulgaria	24.24	
17	5	Tamara Shanidze	Georgia	24.30	
18	5	Ellen De Meyere	Belgium	24.33	
19	2	Mami Awuah-Asante	Netherlands	24.36	
20	3	Saša Prokofjev	Slovenia	24.38	
21	4	Elena Córcoles	Spain	24.44	
22	4	Aksel Gürcan	Turkey	24.45	
23	1	Lena Barry	Ireland	24.64	
24	2	Hana Benešová	Czech Republic	29.03	

=== Semifinals ===
First 2 from each semifinal qualified directly (Q) for the final.

Rank	Heat	Name	Nationality	Time	Notes
1	1	Svetlana Goncharenko	Russia	22.73	Q
2	2	Melanie Paschke	Germany	22.79	Q
3	3	Katerina Koffa	Greece	22.89	Q
4	1	Birgit Rockmeier	Germany	23.05	Q
5	1	Sylviane Félix	France	23.07	
6	2	Natalya Voronova	Russia	23.16	Q
7	2	Lucrécia Jardim	Portugal	23.37	
8	3	Donna Fraser	Great Britain	23.39	Q
9	1	Alenka Bikar	Slovenia	23.81	
10	2	Fabé Dia	France	23.92	
11	3	Fabienne Ficher	France	23.94	
12	1	Monika Gachevska	Bulgaria	24.03	
13	2	Kinga Leszczyńska	Poland	24.25	
14	3	Karin Mayr	Austria	24.33	
	3	Mireille Donders	Switzerland	DQ	

=== Final ===
Rank	Name	Nationality	Time	Notes
1st place, gold medalist(s)	Svetlana Goncharenko	Russia	22.46	
2nd place, silver medalist(s)	Melanie Paschke	Germany	22.50	
3rd place, bronze medalist(s)	Katerina Koffa	Greece	22.86	
4	Birgit Rockmeier	Germany	23.24	
5	Donna Fraser	Great Britain	23.53	
6	Natalya Voronova	Russia	24.29	
