= 1997 IAAF World Indoor Championships – Women's 200 metres =

The women's 200 metres event at the 1997 IAAF World Indoor Championships was held on March 7–8.

== Medalists ==
Gold	Silver	Bronze
Ekaterini Koffa; Greece	Juliet Cuthbert; Jamaica	Svetlana Goncharenko; Russia

== Results ==
=== Heats ===
First 2 of each heat (Q) and next 8 fastest (q) qualified for the semifinals.

Rank	Heat	Name	Nationality	Time	Notes
1	2	Juliet Cuthbert	Jamaica	22.76	Q, SB
2	5	Ekaterini Koffa	Greece	23.05	Q, NR
3	3	Svetlana Goncharenko	Russia	23.07	Q
4	1	Melinda Gainsford-Taylor	Australia	23.13	Q
5	2	Yekaterina Leshcheva	Russia	23.17	Q, SB
6	2	Svetlana Bodritskaya	Kazakhstan	23.25	q, AR
7	1	Merlene Frazer	Jamaica	23.27	Q
8	3	Pauline Davis	Bahamas	23.30	Q, SB
9	1	Virna De Angeli	Italy	23.32	q
10	5	Carlette Guidry	United States	23.43	Q
11	4	Mireille Donders	Switzerland	23.72	Q
11	5	Monika Gachevska	Bulgaria	23.72	q
13	4	Yan Jiankui	China	23.73	Q, NR
14	2	Lauren Hewitt	Australia	23.74	q
15	2	Chryste Gaines	United States	23.78	q
15	4	Donna Fraser	Great Britain	23.78	q
17	4	Erika Suchovská	Czech Republic	23.80	q
18	3	Katharine Merry	Great Britain	23.81	q
19	1	Marina Filipović	Yugoslavia	23.84	PB
20	5	Fabienne Ficher	France	23.88	
21	3	Nora Ivanova	Bulgaria	23.94	
22	4	Alenka Bikar	Slovenia	24.08	
23	5	Elena Apollonio	Italy	24.10	PB
24	5	Sabine Kirchmaier	Austria	24.29	
25	3	Delphine Combe	France	24.31	
26	1	Ameerah Bello	United States Virgin Islands	24.34	
	3	Aksel Gürcan	Turkey	DNS	
	4	Ruth Mangue Nve	Equatorial Guinea	DNS	

=== Semifinals ===
First 2 of each semifinal (Q) qualified directly for the final.

Rank	Heat	Name	Nationality	Time	Notes
1	2	Juliet Cuthbert	Jamaica	22.62	Q, SB
2	3	Svetlana Goncharenko	Russia	22.88	Q
3	1	Merlene Frazer	Jamaica	22.95	Q
4	1	Ekaterini Koffa	Greece	22.96	Q, NR
5	2	Yekaterina Leshcheva	Russia	23.00	Q, SB
6	2	Pauline Davis	Bahamas	23.04	SB
7	1	Mireille Donders	Switzerland	23.30	PB
8	1	Chryste Gaines	United States	23.31	
9	2	Virna De Angeli	Italy	23.39	
10	3	Carlette Guidry	United States	23.48	Q
11	3	Erika Suchovská	Czech Republic	23.63	
12	3	Donna Fraser	Great Britain	23.86	
13	1	Svetlana Bodritskaya	Kazakhstan	23.95	
14	1	Lauren Hewitt	Australia	23.97	
15	3	Yan Jiankui	China	24.18	
16	2	Monika Gachevska	Bulgaria	24.47	
	3	Melinda Gainsford-Taylor	Australia	DQ	
	2	Katharine Merry	Great Britain	DNS	

=== Final ===
Rank	Lane	Name	Nationality	Time	Notes
1st place, gold medalist(s)	6	Ekaterini Koffa	Greece	22.76	NR
2nd place, silver medalist(s)	3	Juliet Cuthbert	Jamaica	22.77	
3rd place, bronze medalist(s)	5	Svetlana Goncharenko	Russia	22.85	
4	4	Merlene Frazer	Jamaica	22.88	
5	1	Yekaterina Leshcheva	Russia	23.81	
	2	Carlette Guidry	United States	DNS	
