= 1994 European Athletics Indoor Championships – Women's 200 metres =

The women's 200 metres event at the 1994 European Athletics Indoor Championships was held in Palais Omnisports de Paris-Bercy on 12 and 13 March.

== Medalists ==
Gold	Silver	Bronze
Galina Malchugina; Russia	Silke Knoll; Germany	Jacqueline Poelman; Netherlands

== Results ==
=== Heats ===
First 2 from each heat (Q) and the next 4 fastest (q) qualified for the semifinals.

Rank	Heat	Name	Nationality	Time	Notes
1	2	Silke Knoll	Germany	23.19	Q
2	3	Galina Malchugina	Russia	23.20	Q
3	4	Maria Staafgård	Sweden	23.47	Q, NR
4	2	Jacqueline Poelman	Netherlands	23.55	Q
5	3	Petya Pendareva	Bulgaria	23.60	Q
6	3	Fabienne Ficher	France	23.62	q
7	3	Lucrécia Jardim	Portugal	23.71	q
8	4	Olga Bogoslovskaya	Russia	23.74	Q
9	1	Giada Gallina	Italy	23.75	Q
9	4	Hana Benešová	Czech Republic	23.75	q
11	2	Mireille Donders	Switzerland	23.78	q
12	1	Marcia Richardson	Great Britain	24.15	Q
13	2	Marika Johansson	Sweden	24.17	
14	4	Éva Barati	Hungary	24.32	
15	2	María del Carmen García	Spain	24.82	
	1	Aksel Gürcan	Turkey	DQ	
	1	Natalya Anisimova	Russia	DNS	
	1	Maia Azarashvili	Georgia	DNS	
	3	Sanna Hernesniemi	Finland	DNS	
	4	Marie-José Pérec	France	DNS	

=== Semifinals ===
First 3 from each semifinal qualified directly (Q) for the final.

Rank	Heat	Name	Nationality	Time	Notes
1	1	Silke Knoll	Germany	22.94	Q
2	2	Galina Malchugina	Russia	23.05	Q
3	1	Jacqueline Poelman	Netherlands	23.41	Q
4	2	Petya Pendareva	Bulgaria	23.67	Q
5	2	Hana Benešová	Czech Republic	23.70	Q
6	2	Maria Staafgård	Sweden	23.73	
7	1	Giada Gallina	Italy	23.84	Q
8	1	Lucrécia Jardim	Portugal	23.88	
9	1	Fabienne Ficher	France	23.91	
10	2	Marcia Richardson	Great Britain	23.95	
11	2	Mireille Donders	Switzerland	24.38	
	1	Olga Bogoslovskaya	Russia	DNF	

=== Final ===
Rank	Lane	Name	Nationality	Time	Notes
1st place, gold medalist(s)	5	Galina Malchugina	Russia	22.41	
2nd place, silver medalist(s)	4	Silke Knoll	Germany	22.96	
3rd place, bronze medalist(s)	3	Jacqueline Poelman	Netherlands	23.43	
4	2	Hana Benešová	Czech Republic	23.67	
5	6	Giada Gallina	Italy	23.79	
6	1	Petya Pendareva	Bulgaria	23.89	
