= 1995 IAAF World Indoor Championships – Women's 60 metres =

The women's 60 metres event at the 1995 IAAF World Indoor Championships was held on 10 March 1995.

Merlene Ottey's winning margin was 0.13 seconds which as of July 2024 remains the only time the women's 60 metres was won by more than a tenth of a second at these championships.

== Medalists ==
Gold	Silver	Bronze
Merlene Ottey; Jamaica	Melanie Paschke; Germany	Carlette Guidry; United States

== Results ==
=== Heats ===
First 2 of each heat (Q) and next 6 fastest (q) qualified for the semifinals.

Rank	Heat	Name	Nationality	Time	Notes
1	1	Melanie Paschke	Germany	7.12	Q
1	4	Merlene Ottey	Jamaica	7.12	Q
3	4	Lalao Ravaonirina	Madagascar	7.21	Q, NR
4	4	Nelli Fiere-Cooman	Netherlands	7.21	q
5	1	Iryna Pukha	Ukraine	7.22	Q
5	4	Liliana Allen	Cuba	7.22	q
7	1	Christy Opara-Thompson	Nigeria	7.23	q
8	2	Carlette Guidry	United States	7.25	Q
9	3	Yekaterina Leshchova	Russia	7.26	Q
9	4	Sanna Hernesniemi	Finland	7.26	q
11	3	Chryste Gaines	United States	7.28	Q
12	2	Beverly McDonald	Jamaica	7.31	Q
13	2	Stephanie Douglas	Great Britain	7.31	q
14	5	Nadezhda Rashchupkina	Russia	7.33	Q
15	1	Jerneja Perc	Slovenia	7.34	q
16	3	Éva Barati	Hungary	7.35	
16	4	Sabine Tröger	Austria	7.35	
16	5	Ekaterini Koffa	Greece	7.35	Q
19	5	Wang Huei-Chen	Chinese Taipei	7.37	NR
20	2	Dainelky Pèrez	Cuba	7.38	
20	3	Odile Singa	France	7.38	
20	5	Anelia Nuneva	Bulgaria	7.38	
23	5	Carme Blay	Spain	7.39	
24	2	Jacqueline Poelman	Netherlands	7.42	
25	3	Karen Clarke	Canada	7.44	
25	3	Aileen McGillivary	Great Britain	7.44	
25	5	Tarana Perry	Canada	7.44	
28	1	Margret Haug	Switzerland	7.45	
28	2	N'Deye Binta Dia	Senegal	7.45	
28	5	Sara Wüest	Switzerland	7.45	
31	3	Denisa Obdržálková	Czech Republic	7.48	
32	4	Alenka Bikar	Slovenia	7.50	
33	4	Aksel Gürcan	Turkey	7.50	
35	1	Rahela Markt	Croatia	7.57	
34	5	Antónia Margarete de Jesus	Angola	7.63	
36	2	Dagmar Hölbl	Austria	7.65	
37	1	Clara Phillip	Saint Lucia	7.82	
38	3	Rudina Xhaja	Albania	7.91	
	1	Desislava Dimitrova	Bulgaria	DNS	

=== Semifinals ===
First 4 of each semifinal qualified directly (Q) for the final.

Rank	Heat	Name	Nationality	Time	Notes
1	1	Merlene Ottey	Jamaica	7.04	Q
2	1	Liliana Allen	Cuba	7.13	Q
3	1	Carlette Guidry	United States	7.14	Q
4	2	Melanie Paschke	Germany	7.15	Q
5	1	Nelli Fiere-Cooman	Netherlands	7.20	Q
6	2	Beverly McDonald	Jamaica	7.21	Q
7	2	Chryste Gaines	United States	7.23	Q
8	2	Lalao Ravaonirina	Madagascar	7.24	Q
9	1	Iryna Pukha	Ukraine	7.25	
10	2	Yekaterina Leshchova	Russia	7.27	
11	2	Christy Opara-Thompson	Nigeria	7.28	
12	2	Stephanie Douglas	Great Britain	7.30	
13	2	Sanna Hernesniemi	Finland	7.31	
14	1	Nadezhda Rashchupkina	Russia	7.35	
15	1	Jerneja Perc	Slovenia	7.36	
	1	Ekaterini Koffa	Greece	DQ	R162.7

=== Final ===
Rank	Name	Nationality	Time	Notes
1st place, gold medalist(s)	Merlene Ottey	Jamaica	6.97	
2nd place, silver medalist(s)	Melanie Paschke	Germany	7.10	
3rd place, bronze medalist(s)	Carlette Guidry	United States	7.11	
4	Liliana Allen	Cuba	7.13	
5	Beverly McDonald	Jamaica	7.16	
6	Nelli Fiere-Cooman	Netherlands	7.17	
7	Chryste Gaines	United States	7.22	
8	Lalao Ravaonirina	Madagascar	7.28	
