= 1998 European Athletics Championships – Women's 4 × 100 metres relay =

Women's 4 × 100 metres relay at the European Athletics Championships

The women's 4 × 100 metres relay at the 1998 European Athletics Championships was held at the Népstadion on 22 August.

== Medalists ==
Gold	Katia Benth; Frédérique Bangué; Sylviane Félix; Christine Arron; France
Silver	Melanie Paschke; Gabi Rockmeier; Birgit Rockmeier; Andrea Philipp; Germany
Bronze	Oksana Ekk; Galina Malchugina; Natalya Voronova; Irina Privalova; Russia

== Results ==
KEY:	q	Fastest non-qualifiers	Q	Qualified	NR	National record	PB	Personal best	SB	Seasonal best

=== Heats ===
Qualification: First 3 in each heat (Q) and the next 2 fastest (q) advance to the Final.

Rank	Heat	Nation	Athlete	Time	Notes
1	2	France	Katia Benth, Frédérique Bangué, Sylviane Félix, Christine Arron	42.87	Q
2	1	Germany	Melanie Paschke, Gabi Rockmeier, Birgit Rockmeier, Andrea Philipp	43.23	
3	1	Russia	Oksana Ekk, Galina Malchugina, Natalya Voronova, Irina Privalova	43.56	Q
4	1	Ukraine	Iryna Pukha, Tetyana Lukyanenko, Anzhelika Shevchuk, Anzhela Kravchenko	43.60	Q, SB
5	2	Greece	Maria Tsoni, Ekaterini Koffa, Panayiota Koutrouli, Ekaterini Thanou	44.32	Q
6	2	Italy	Elena Apollonio, Manuela Grillo, Maria Ruggeri, Manuela Levorato	44.41	Q
6	1	Belarus	Tatyana Barashko, Margarita Molchan, Natallia Solohub, Natallia Safronnikava	44.41	q, SB
8	2	Finland	Heidi Hannula, Sanna Kyllönen, Johanna Manninen, Heli Koivula	44.59	q, SB
9	2	Spain	Carmen Blay, Elena Córcoles, Arantxa Iglesias, Susana Martin	44.64	
10	1	Hungary	Petronella Árva, Enikő Szabó, Éva Barati, Tünde Vaszi	44.76	SB
11	1	Portugal	Maria Carmo Tavares, Natalia Moura, Lucrécia Jardim, Severina Cravid	44.87	
	2	Poland	Agnieszka Rysiukiewicz, Kinga Leszczyńska, Monika Borejza, Irena Sznajder	DSQ	

=== Final ===
Rank	Nation	Athletes	Time	Notes
1st place, gold medalist(s)	France	Katia Benth, Frédérique Bangué, Sylviane Félix, Christine Arron	42.59	
2nd place, silver medalist(s)	Germany	Melanie Paschke, Gabi Rockmeier, Birgit Rockmeier, Andrea Philipp	42.68	
3rd place, bronze medalist(s)	Russia	Oksana Ekk, Galina Malchugina, Natalya Voronova, Irina Privalova	42.73	
4	Ukraine	Iryna Pukha, Tetyana Lukyanenko, Anzhelika Shevchuk, Anzhela Kravchenko	43.58	SB
5	Greece	Maria Tsoni, Ekaterini Koffa, Panayiota Koutrouli, Ekaterini Thanou	44.01	
6	Finland	Heidi Hannula, Sanna Kyllönen, Johanna Manninen, Heli Koivula	44.10	SB
7	Italy	Elena Apollonio, Manuela Grillo, Maria Ruggeri, Manuela Levorato	44.46	
8	Belarus	Tatyana Barashko, Margarita Molchan, Natallia Solohub, Natallia Safronnikava	44.76	
