= 1999 IAAF World Indoor Championships – Women's 200 metres =

The women's 200 metres event at the 1999 IAAF World Indoor Championships was held on March 5–6.

== Medalists ==
Gold	Silver	Bronze
Ionela Târlea; Romania	Svetlana Goncharenko; Russia	Pauline Davis; Bahamas

== Results ==
=== Heats ===
First 2 of each heat (Q) and next 8 fastest (q) qualified for the semifinals.

Rank	Heat	Name	Nationality	Time	Notes
1	5	Ionela Târlea	Romania	22.64	Q, NR
2	1	Oksana Dyachenko-Ekk	Russia	22.91	Q, PB
3	2	Svetlana Goncharenko	Russia	22.94	Q
3	5	Pauline Davis	Bahamas	22.94	Q, SB
5	4	Juliet Campbell	Jamaica	23.05	Q
6	3	Birgit Rockmeier	Germany	23.10	Q
7	1	Fabe Dia	France	23.13	Q, PB
8	3	Wendy Hartman	South Africa	23.16	Q, NR
9	4	Gabi Rockmeier	Germany	23.28	Q
10	3	Erika Suchovská	Czech Republic	23.35	q, SB
11	4	Zuzanna Radecka	Poland	23.36	q
12	2	Agnė Visockaitė	Lithuania	23.39	Q, NR
13	2	Alenka Bikar	Slovenia	23.40	q
14	2	Zundra Feagin-Alexander	United States	23.53	q
15	3	Nora Ivanova	Bulgaria	23.57	q
16	4	LaTasha Colander	United States	23.70	q
17	1	Shani Anderson	Great Britain	23.76	q
18	5	Fabienne Ficher	France	23.80	q
19	5	Elena Córcoles	Spain	24.05	
20	2	Marie Gnahore	Ivory Coast	24.51	
21	5	Olga Dor-Dogadedko	Israel	25.26	
22	1	Tamara Shanidze	Georgia	25.42	
	1	Monika Gachevska	Bulgaria	DNF	
	3	Ameerah Bello	United States Virgin Islands	DNS	
	4	Motoka Arai	Japan	DNS	

=== Semifinals ===
First 2 of each semifinal qualified directly (Q) for the final.

Rank	Heat	Name	Nationality	Time	Notes
1	1	Ionela Târlea	Romania	22.66	Q
2	3	Svetlana Goncharenko	Russia	22.70	Q, SB
3	1	Pauline Davis	Bahamas	22.93	Q, SB
4	3	Juliet Campbell	Jamaica	22.96	Q, PB
5	2	Oksana Dyachenko-Ekk	Russia	23.01	Q
6	2	Birgit Rockmeier	Germany	23.15	Q
7	1	Fabe Dia	France	23.19	
8	2	Wendy Hartman	South Africa	23.21	
9	3	Gabi Rockmeier	Germany	23.31	
10	1	Alenka Bikar	Slovenia	23.45	
11	2	Erika Suchovská	Czech Republic	23.58	
12	1	Zuzanna Radecka	Poland	23.67	
13	3	Agnė Visockaitė	Lithuania	23.81	
14	2	Zundra Feagin-Alexander	United States	24.16	
15	2	Fabienne Ficher	France	24.32	
16	3	LaTasha Colander	United States	24.35	
17	1	Shani Anderson	Great Britain	24.58	
	3	Nora Ivanova	Bulgaria	DNS	

=== Final ===
Rank	Lane	Name	Nationality	Time	Notes
1st place, gold medalist(s)	5	Ionela Târlea	Romania	22.39	WL, NR
2nd place, silver medalist(s)	6	Svetlana Goncharenko	Russia	22.69	SB
3rd place, bronze medalist(s)	4	Pauline Davis	Bahamas	22.70	SB
4	3	Oksana Dyachenko-Ekk	Russia	23.03	
5	2	Juliet Campbell	Jamaica	23.11	
6	1	Birgit Rockmeier	Germany	23.74	
