= Maria Tsoni =

Greek sprinter (born 1963)

Personal information
- Born: 2 May 1963 (age 62) Agrinio, Greece
- Height: 1.63 m (5 ft 4 in)
- Weight: 65 kg (143 lb)

Sport
- Sport: Track and field
- Event: 100 metres
- Club: GE Agriniou; Panellinios Gymnastikos Syllogos

Maria Tsoni (Greek: Μαρία Τσώνη; born 1 March 1963 in Agrinio) is a retired Greek athlete who specialised in the sprinting events. She represented her country at the 1988 Summer Olympics, as well as the 1997 World Championships.

== Competition record ==
Year	Competition	Venue	Position	Event	Notes
Representing Greece
1988	Olympic Games	Seoul, South Korea	15th (sf)	4 × 100 m relay	45.74
1994	European Championships	Helsinki, Finland	10th (h)	4 × 100 m relay	44.77
1996	European Indoor Championships	Stockholm, Sweden	6th (sf)	60 m	7.36
1997	World Indoor Championships	Paris, France	13th (sf)	60 m	7.32
1997	Mediterranean Games	Bari, Italy	4th	100 m	11.30
1997	Mediterranean Games	Bari, Italy	2nd	4 × 100 m relay	43.07
1997	World Championships	Athens, Greece	32nd (qf)	100 m	11.62
1997	World Championships	Athens, Greece	9th (h)	4 × 100 m relay	43.15
1998	European Indoor Championships	Valencia, Spain	20th (h)	60 m	7.49
1998	European Championships	Budapest, Hungary	5th	4 × 100 m relay	44.01

== Personal bests ==
Outdoor

- 100 metres – 11.30 (+0.4 m/s) (Bari 1997)

Indoor

- 60 metres – 7.23 (Piraeus 1998)
