= 2002 European Athletics Championships – Women's 100 metres =

Women's 100 metres at the 2002 European Athletics Championships
- Venue: Olympiastadion
- Location: Munich
- Dates: 6-7 August
- Competitors: 27 from 17 nations
- Winning time: 11.10

Medalists
gold medal	Ekaterini Thanou	Greece
silver medal	Kim Gevaert	Belgium
bronze medal	Manuela Levorato	Italy

The women's 100 metres at the 2002 European Athletics Championships were held at the Olympiastadion on August 6 and August 7.

== Results ==
=== Heats ===
Qualification: First 3 of each heat (Q) and the next 4 fastest (q) qualified for the semifinals.

Rank	Heat	Name	Nationality	Time	Notes
1	4	Ekaterini Thanou	Greece	11.07	Q
2	3	Kim Gevaert	Belgium	11.19	Q
3	3	Karin Mayr	Austria	11.35	Q
4	3	Melanie Paschke	Germany	11.36	Q
5	3	Odiah Sidibe	France	11.40	q
5	4	Abiodun Oyepitan	Great Britain	11.40	Q
7	1	Glory Alozie	Spain	11.42	Q
8	1	Yulia Bartsevich	Belarus	11.42	Q
9	1	Marina Kislova	Russia	11.45	Q
9	4	Delphine Combe	France	11.45	Q
11	2	Manuela Levorato	Italy	11.46	Q
12	4	Olena Pastushenko	Ukraine	11.47	q
13	1	Alenka Bikar	Slovenia	11.49	q
14	3	Agnė Visockaitė	Lithuania	11.50	q
15	2	Georgia Kokloni	Greece	11.51	Q
16	1	Marion Wagner	Germany	11.53	
16	2	Sina Schielke	Germany	11.53	Q
18	2	Anzhela Kravchenko	Ukraine	11.54	
19	2	Beata Szkudlarz	Poland	11.56	
20	1	Johanna Manninen	Finland	11.58	
21	2	Joice Maduaka	Great Britain	11.60	
22	4	Natalya Ignatova	Russia	11.62	
23	4	Bettina Müller-Weissina	Austria	11.62	
24	4	Enikő Szabó	Hungary	11.62	
25	3	Larisa Kruglova	Russia	11.65	
25	3	Vincenza Cali	Italy	11.66	
26	1	Daniela Bellanova	Italy	11.78	
27	2	Aksel Gürcan	Turkey	11.98	

=== Semifinals ===
Qualification: First 4 of each semifinal (Q) qualified directly for the final.

Rank	Heat	Name	Nationality	Time	Notes
1	2	Ekaterini Thanou	Greece	11.05	Q
2	2	Manuela Levorato	Italy	11.26	Q
3	1	Kim Gevaert	Belgium	11.27	Q
4	1	Glory Alozie	Spain	11.32	Q
5	1	Abiodun Oyepitan	Great Britain	11.33	Q
6	2	Melanie Paschke	Germany	11.35	Q
7	1	Alenka Bikar	Slovenia	11.37	Q
8	2	Odiah Sidibe	France	11.42	Q
9	1	Georgia Kokloni	Greece	11.44	
9	2	Yulia Bartsevich	Belarus	11.44	
9	2	Agnė Visockaitė	Lithuania	11.44	
12	1	Sina Schielke	Germany	11.48	
13	1	Marina Kislova	Russia	11.49	
14	2	Karin Mayr	Austria	11.52	
15	2	Olena Pastushenko	Ukraine	11.54	
16	1	Delphine Combe	France	11.65	

=== Final ===
Rank	Name	Nationality	Time	Notes
1st place, gold medalist(s)	Ekaterini Thanou	Greece	11.10	
2nd place, silver medalist(s)	Kim Gevaert	Belgium	11.22	
3rd place, bronze medalist(s)	Manuela Levorato	Italy	11.23	
4	Glory Alozie	Spain	11.32	
5	Melanie Paschke	Germany	11.37	
6	Abiodun Oyepitan	Great Britain	11.41	
7	Odiah Sidibe	France	11.57	
8	Alenka Bikar	Slovenia	11.63	
			Wind: -0.7 m/s	
