= Alenka Bikar =

Slovenian sprinter (born 1974)

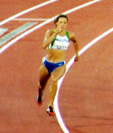
- Bikar in 2000

Member of the National Assembly of Slovenia
- In office 19 April 2012 – 2 June 2014
- Preceded by: Zoran Janković

Personal details
- Born: 7 January 1974 (age 52) Ljubljana, Slovenia
- Party: Positive Slovenia
- Occupation: Sprinter (retired)

Alenka Bikar (born 7 January 1974) is a retired female sprinter from Slovenia, born in Ljubljana. She specialised in the 200 metres, competing in three Olympic games from 1996 to 2004. She was also named Slovenian Sportswoman of the Year in 2001. Bikar won the gold medal in the 200 m in the Mediterranean Games in 2005.

On 19 April 2012, Bikar replaced Zoran Janković as a deputy of the Positive Slovenia party in the National Assembly of Slovenia.

== Competition record ==
Year	Competition	Venue	Position	Event	Notes
Representing Slovenia
1995	World Indoor Championships	Barcelona, Spain	32nd (h)	60 m	7.50
1996	European Indoor Championships	Stockholm, Sweden	5th	60 m	7.32
1996	European Indoor Championships	Stockholm, Sweden	4th	200 m	23.68
1996	Olympic Games	Atlanta, United States	13th (sf)	200 m	22.82
1997	World Indoor Championships	Paris, France	22nd (sf)	200 m	24.08
1997	Mediterranean Games	Bari, Italy	3rd	200 m	22.95
1997	World Championships	Athens, Greece	27th (qf)	200 m	23.43
1998	European Indoor Championships	Valencia, Spain	8th	60 m	7.40
1998	European Indoor Championships	Valencia, Spain	9th (sf)	200 m	23.81
1998	European Championships	Budapest, Hungary	9th (sf)	200 m	23.42
1999	World Indoor Championships	Maebashi, Japan	13th (sf)	60 m	7.24
1999	World Indoor Championships	Maebashi, Japan	10th (sf)	200 m	23.45
1999	World Championships	Seville, Spain	17th (h)	200 m	22.98
2000	European Indoor Championships	Ghent, Belgium	5th	60 m	7.20
2000	European Indoor Championships	Ghent, Belgium	2nd	200 m	23.16
2000	Olympic Games	Sydney, Australia	14th (qf)	200 m	23.01
2001	World Indoor Championships	Lisbon, Portugal	6th	200 m	23.74
2001	World Championships	Edmonton, Canada	12th (qf)	100 m	11.34
2001	World Championships	Edmonton, Canada	5th	200 m	23.00
2001	Goodwill Games	Brisbane, Australia	7th	200 m	23.47
2002	European Championships	Munich, Germany	8th	100 m	11.63
2002	European Championships	Munich, Germany	8th	200 m	23.37
2003	World Indoor Championships	Birmingham, United Kingdom	–	200 m	DQ
2003	World Championships	Paris, France		4 × 100 m relay	DQ
2004	World Indoor Championships	Budapest, Hungary	17th (sf)	60 m	7.34
2004	World Indoor Championships	Budapest, Hungary	5th (sf)	200 m	23.46
2004	Olympic Games	Athens, Greece	27th (qf)	200 m	23.38
2005	European Indoor Championships	Madrid, Spain	9th (sf)	200 m	23.82
2005	Mediterranean Games	Almería, Spain	1st	200 m	23.65
2005	World Championships	Helsinki, Finland	32nd (qf)	100 m	11.69

=== Personal bests ===
- 100 metres – 11.21s (2001)
- 200 metres – 22.76s (2001)
