= Éva Barati =

Hungarian sprinter

Personal information
- Born: 27 December 1968 (age 56) Üröm, Hungary
- Height: 1.65 m (5 ft 5 in)
- Weight: 55 kg (121 lb)

Sport
- Sport: Track and field
- Event(s): 100 metres, 200 metres
- Club: Budapest Honvéd

Éva Barati (born 27 December 1968 in Üröm) is a retired Hungarian athlete who competed in sprinting events. She represented her country at the 1992 Summer Olympics, as well as four World Indoor Championships. Her best position was sixth place in the 60 metres at the 1996 European Indoor Championships.

== Competition record ==
| Year | Competition | Venue | Position | Event | Notes |
Representing Hungary
| 1989 | World Indoor Championships | Budapest, Hungary | 13th (h) | 60 m | 7.50 |
| 1992 | Olympic Games | Barcelona, Spain | 11th (h) | 4 × 400 m relay | 3:33.81 |
| 1993 | World Indoor Championships | Toronto, Canada | 27th (h) | 60 m | 7.63 |
| 1993 | World Indoor Championships | Toronto, Canada | 17th (h) | 200 m | 24.59 |
| 1994 | European Indoor Championships | Paris, France | 9th (h) | 60 m | 7.35 |
| 1994 | European Indoor Championships | Paris, France | 14th (h) | 200 m | 24.32 |
| 1994 | European Championships | Helsinki, Finland | 21st (h) | 100 m | 11.72 |
| 1994 | European Championships | Helsinki, Finland | 19th (h) | 200 m | 23.88 |
| 1995 | World Indoor Championships | Barcelona, Spain | 16th (h) | 60 m | 7.35 |
| 1996 | European Indoor Championships | Stockholm, Sweden | 6th | 60 m | 7.44 |
| 1996 | European Indoor Championships | Stockholm, Sweden | 14th (h) | 200 m | 24.74 |
| 1997 | World Indoor Championships | Paris, France | 27th (h) | 60 m | 7.64 |
| 1998 | European Championships | Budapest, Hungary | 27th (h) | 100 m | 11.92 |
| 1998 | European Championships | Budapest, Hungary | 10th (h) | 4 × 100 m relay | 44.76 |

== Personal bests ==
Outdoor

- 100 metres – 11.52 (Budapest 1994)
- 200 metres – 23.66 (Trento 1994)

Indoor

- 60 metres – 7.22 (Budapest 1994)
- 200 metres – 24.27 (Budapest 1993)
