= Carme Blay =

Spanish sprinter (born 1973)

Personal information
- Born: 31 July 1973 (age 53) Sant Pere de Ribes, Spain

Sport
- Sport: Track and field
Medal record
Representing Spain
Mediterranean Games
Silver medal – second place	2005 Almeria	4x100m relay

Carme Blay Garbayo (born 31 July 1973) is a retired Spanish athlete who specialised in the sprinting events. She represented her country in the 4 × 100 metres relay at the 1999 and 2003 World Championships and in the 60 metres at the 1995 and 2004 World Indoor Championships. She is a seven-times national champion in the 100 metres (1995, 1997, 2000-2003) and a ten-time champion in the indoor 60 metres (1995-2004). She retired after the 2005 season.

== Competition record ==
Year	Competition	Venue	Position	Event	Notes
Representing Spain
1991	European Junior Championships	Thessaloniki, Greece	7th	4x100 m relay	47.19
1992	World Junior Championships	Seoul, South Korea	11th (sf)	4x100 m relay	46.41
1994	European Championships	Helsinki, Finland	11th (h)	4x100 m relay	45.11
1995	World Indoor Championships	Barcelona, Spain	23rd (h)	60 m	7.39
1995	Universiade	Fukuoka, Japan	26th (qf)	100 m	12.23
1996	European Indoor Championships	Stockholm, Sweden	14th (h)	60 m	7.46
1997	Mediterranean Games	Bari, Italy	8th	100 m	11.64
1997	Mediterranean Games	Bari, Italy	4th	4x100 m relay	44.55
1998	European Indoor Championships	Valencia, Spain	11th (sf)	60 m	7.35
1998	Ibero-American Championships	Lisbon, Portugal	4th	100 m	11.65
1998	Ibero-American Championships	Lisbon, Portugal	1st	4x100 m relay	44.54
1998	European Championships	Budapest, Hungary	9th (h)	4x100 m relay	44.64
1999	Universiade	Palma de Mallorca, Spain	21st (qf)	100 m	11.98
1999	Universiade	Palma de Mallorca, Spain	8th	4x100 m relay	45.95
1999	World Championships	Seville, Spain	15th (h)	4x100 m relay	45.14
2000	European Indoor Championships	Ghent, Belgium	16th (h)	60 m	7.37
2002	European Championships	Munich, Germany	10th (h)	4x100 m relay	44.32
2002	World Cup	Madrid, Spain	8th	4x100 m relay	45.07
2003	World Championships	Paris, France	14th (h)	4x100 m relay	44.08
2004	World Indoor Championships	Budapest, Hungary	27th (h)	60 m	7.52
2005	European Indoor Championships	Madrid, Spain	20th (h)	60 m	7.50
2005	Mediterranean Games	Almería, Spain	2nd	4x100 m relay	44.47

== Personal bests ==
Outdoor

- 100 metres – 11.57 (+1.1 m/s) (Salamanca 1996)
- 200 metres – 24.45 (-0.9 m/s) (Castellón 2002)

Indoor

- 60 metres – 7.35 (Valencia 1998)
