= Erika Suchovská =

Czech sprinter

Erika Suchovská (born 27 July 1967 in Hodonín) is a retired Czech athlete who competed primarily in the 200 metres. She won the silver medal in that event at the 1996 European Indoor Championships. In addition, she represented her country at the 1995 World Championships.

== Competition record ==
Year	Competition	Venue	Position	Event	Notes
Representing Czech Republic
1994	European Championships	Helsinki, Finland	9th (sf)	200 m	23.34 (wind: +1.4 m/s)
1994	European Championships	Helsinki, Finland	5th	4 × 400 m relay	3:27.95
1995	World Championships	Gothenburg, Sweden	heats	200 m	23.13
1996	European Indoor Championships	Stockholm, Sweden	2nd	200 m	23.16
1997	World Indoor Championships	Paris, France	semi-final	200 m	23.63
1998	European Championships	Budapest, Hungary	8th	200 m	23.18
1999	World Indoor Championships	Maebashi, Japan	semi-final	200 m	23.58

== Personal bests ==
Outdoor

- 100 metres – 11.34 (+2.0 m/s) (Lisbon 1996)
- 200 metres – 22.96 (Saint-Peterburg 1998)

Indoor

- 60 metres – 7.42 (Karlsruhe 1999)
- 200 metres – 23.16 (Stockholm 1996)
