= Fabienne Ficher =

French sprinter (born 1966)

Personal information
- Born: 25 April 1966 (age 59) Paris, France
- Height: 1.75 m (5 ft 9 in)
- Weight: 61 kg (134 lb)

Sport
- Sport: Athletics
- Event(s): 200 m, 400 m
- Club: Stade français

Fabienne Ficher (born 25 April 1966 in Paris) is a retired French athlete who specialised in the 400 meters. She competed at the 1988 Summer Olympics as well as one outdoor and five indoor World Championships.

== International competitions ==
Year	Competition	Venue	Position	Event	Notes
Representing France
1985	World Indoor Games	Paris, France	4th	200 m	23.75
1986	European Indoor Championships	Madrid, Spain	8th (sf)	200 m	24.38
1986	European Championships	Stuttgart, West Germany	7th	400 m	51.91
1987	European Indoor Championships	Liévin, France	8th (sf)	400 m	53.86
1987	World Championships	Rome, Italy	17th (sf)	400 m	52.58
1987	World Championships	Rome, Italy	7th	4 × 400 m relay	3:27.60
1988	European Indoor Championships	Budapest, Hungary	11th (sf)	400 m	53.17
1988	Olympic Games	Seoul, South Korea	23rd (sf)	400 m	52.95
1988	Olympic Games	Seoul, South Korea	7th	4 × 400 m relay	3:29.37
1989	European Indoor Championships	The Hague, Netherlands	6th	400 m	54.67
1990	European Championships	Split, Yugoslavia	11th (sf)	200 m	23.39
1990	European Championships	Split, Yugoslavia	5th	4 × 400 m relay	3:25.16
1991	World Indoor Championships	Seville, Spain	8th (sf)	200 m	23.63
1991	Mediterranean Games	Athens, Greece	2nd	200 m	23.40
1994	European Indoor Championships	Paris, France	9th (sf)	200 m	23.91
1994	Jeux de la Francophonie	Bondoufle, France	3rd	200 m	23.60
1994	Jeux de la Francophonie	Bondoufle, France	1st	4 × 100 m relay	43.65
1995	World Indoor Championships	Barcelona, Spain	13th (h)	200 m	23.87
1997	World Indoor Championships	Paris, France	20th (h)	200 m	23.88
1997	Jeux de la Francophonie	Antananarivo, Madagascar	2nd	400 m	52.99
1998	European Indoor Championships	Valencia, Spain	11th (sf)	200 m	23.94
1998	European Championships	Budapest, Hungary	12th (sf)	400 m	52.95
1998	European Championships	Budapest, Hungary	4th (h)	4 × 400 m relay	3:29.67
1999	World Indoor Championships	Maebashi, Japan	15th (sf)	200 m	24.32

== Personal bests ==
Outdoor

- 100 metres – 11.62 (+1.1 m/s, Montgeron 1996)
- 200 metres – 23.29 (+2.0 m/s, Montgeron 1998)
- 400 metres – 51.81 (Tours 1988)

Indoor

- 60 metres – 7.27 (Eaubonne 1999)
- 200 metres – 23.20 (Liévin 1999)
- 400 metres – 53.17 (Liévin 1988)

== See also ==
- French records in athletics
- Category:French athletes
