= Calister Ubah =

Nigerian sprinter

Personal information
- Nationality: Nigerian
- Born: 15 November 1973 (age 51)

Sport
- Sport: Sprinting
- Event: 200 metres

Calister Ubah (born 15 November 1973) is a Nigerian sprinter. She competed in the women's 200 metres at the 1996 Summer Olympics.
