= 1994 World Junior Championships in Athletics – Women's 100 metres =

The women's 100 metres event at the 1994 World Junior Championships in Athletics was held in Lisbon, Portugal, at Estádio Universitário de Lisboa on 20 and 21 July.

== Medalists ==
Gold	Sabrina Kelly; United States
Silver	Aspen Burkett; United States
Bronze	Philomena Mensah; Ghana

== Results ==
=== Final ===
21 July
Wind: +2.0 m/s

Rank	Name	Nationality	Time	Notes
1st place, gold medalist(s)	Sabrina Kelly	United States	11.36	
2nd place, silver medalist(s)	Aspen Burkett	United States	11.40	
3rd place, bronze medalist(s)	Philomena Mensah	Ghana	11.43	
4	Katerína Thánou	Greece	11.46	
5	Debbie Ferguson	Bahamas	11.48	
6	Kerry-Ann Richards	Jamaica	11.56	
7	Frédérique Bangué	France	11.57	
8	Dainelky Pérez	Cuba	11.58	

=== Semifinals ===
21 July

==== Semifinal 1 ====
Wind: +0.8 m/s

Rank	Name	Nationality	Time	Notes
1	Philomena Mensah	Ghana	11.39	Q
2	Sabrina Kelly	United States	11.48	Q
3	Debbie Ferguson	Bahamas	11.51	Q
4	Kerry-Ann Richards	Jamaica	11.52	Q
5	Huang Mei	China	11.60	
6	Heide Seÿerling	South Africa	11.62	
7	Mercy Nku	Nigeria	11.77	
8	Esther Möller	Germany	11.89	

==== Semifinal 2 ====
Wind: +1.3 m/s

Rank	Name	Nationality	Time	Notes
1	Aspen Burkett	United States	11.38	Q
2	Katerína Thánou	Greece	11.43	Q
3	Dainelky Pérez	Cuba	11.50	Q
4	Frédérique Bangué	France	11.52	Q
5	Gabriele Becker	Germany	11.66	
6	Vera Georgieva	Bulgaria	11.77	
7	Beverley Langley	Jamaica	11.80	
8	Viktoriya Tokonbayeva	Kazakhstan	12.02	

=== Quarterfinals ===
20 July

==== Quarterfinal 1 ====
Wind: +1.4 m/s

Rank	Name	Nationality	Time	Notes
1	Philomena Mensah	Ghana	11.49	Q
2	Dainelky Pérez	Cuba	11.67	Q
3	Beverley Langley	Jamaica	11.71	Q
4	Esther Möller	Germany	11.78	Q
5	Marie Joëlle Dogbo	France	11.81	
6	Tomomi Kaneko	Japan	11.91	
7	Mame Twumasi	Canada	11.95	
8	Monica Giolli	Italy	12.01	

==== Quarterfinal 2 ====
Wind: +1.0 m/s

Rank	Name	Nationality	Time	Notes
1	Aspen Burkett	United States	11.48	Q
2	Kerry-Ann Richards	Jamaica	11.66	Q
3	Huang Mei	China	11.67	Q
4	Mercy Nku	Nigeria	11.70	Q
5	Tatyana Kotelnikova	Uzbekistan	11.84	
6	Štepánka Klapácová	Czech Republic	11.89	
7	Ayanna Hutchinson	Trinidad and Tobago	11.93	
8	Kelly Miller	New Zealand	12.22	

==== Quarterfinal 3 ====
Wind: +2.4 m/s

Rank	Name	Nationality	Time	Notes
1	Sabrina Kelly	United States	11.50 w	Q
2	Frédérique Bangué	France	11.55 w	Q
3	Vera Georgieva	Bulgaria	11.56 w	Q
4	Gabriele Becker	Germany	11.64 w	Q
5	Chen Shu-Chen	Chinese Taipei	11.76 w	
6	Endurance Ojokolo	Nigeria	11.81 w	
7	Esmari Le Roux	South Africa	12.05 w	
8	Natalya Drozdova	Russia	12.06 w	

==== Quarterfinal 4 ====
Wind: +0.6 m/s

Rank	Name	Nationality	Time	Notes
1	Katerína Thánou	Greece	11.54	Q
2	Debbie Ferguson	Bahamas	11.56	Q
3	Heide Seÿerling	South Africa	11.64	Q
4	Viktoriya Tokonbayeva	Kazakhstan	11.90	Q
5	Radana Volná	Czech Republic	12.02	
6	Jane Arnott	New Zealand	12.06	
7	Roberta Bettio	Italy	12.08	
8	Tonya Vassileva	Bulgaria	12.26	

=== Heats ===
20 July

==== Heat 1 ====
Wind: 0.0 m/s

Rank	Name	Nationality	Time	Notes
1	Philomena Mensah	Ghana	11.63	Q
2	Vera Georgieva	Bulgaria	11.89	Q
3	Štepánka Klapácová	Czech Republic	11.92	Q
4	Chen Shu-Chen	Chinese Taipei	11.94	Q
5	Monica Giolli	Italy	11.98	q
6	Tomomi Kaneko	Japan	12.10	q
7	Elvira Dzhabarova	Azerbaijan	12.31	
8	Esther Foufoué	Côte d'Ivoire	12.53	

==== Heat 2 ====
Wind: +0.1 m/s

Rank	Name	Nationality	Time	Notes
1	Kerry-Ann Richards	Jamaica	11.59	Q
2	Sabrina Kelly	United States	11.61	Q
3	Katerína Thánou	Greece	11.72	Q
4	Roberta Bettio	Italy	11.98	Q
5	Tonya Vassileva	Bulgaria	12.07	q
6	Kelly Miller	New Zealand	12.14	q
7	Ulrika Larsson	Sweden	12.21	
8	Baek Myeong-Ju	South Korea	12.72	

==== Heat 3 ====
Wind: +0.1 m/s

Rank	Name	Nationality	Time	Notes
1	Marie Joëlle Dogbo	France	11.69	Q
2	Huang Mei	China	11.73	Q
3	Beverley Langley	Jamaica	11.82	Q
4	Jane Arnott	New Zealand	11.96	Q
5	Tatyana Kotelnikova	Uzbekistan	11.97	q
6	Radana Volná	Czech Republic	12.00	q
7	Sara Pelliccioni	San Marino	14.13	

==== Heat 4 ====
Wind: +0.1 m/s

Rank	Name	Nationality	Time	Notes
1	Heide Seÿerling	South Africa	11.67	Q
2	Aspen Burkett	United States	11.68	Q
3	Gabriele Becker	Germany	11.75	Q
4	Endurance Ojokolo	Nigeria	11.98	Q
5	Zinaida Loginova	Moldova	12.22	
6	Mirenda Francourt	Seychelles	12.39	
7	Sortelina Pires	São Tomé and Príncipe	13.19	

==== Heat 5 ====
Wind: -0.5 m/s

Rank	Name	Nationality	Time	Notes
1	Frédérique Bangué	France	11.63	Q
2	Dainelky Pérez	Cuba	11.80	Q
3	Mercy Nku	Nigeria	11.83	Q
4	Mame Twumasi	Canada	12.11	Q
5	Esmari Le Roux	South Africa	12.19	q
6	Alemitu Dissassa	Ethiopia	13.06	
7	Bina Shrestha	Nepal	13.78	

==== Heat 6 ====
Wind: +0.1 m/s

Rank	Name	Nationality	Time	Notes
1	Debbie Ferguson	Bahamas	11.66	Q
2	Viktoriya Tokonbayeva	Kazakhstan	11.97	Q
3	Esther Möller	Germany	12.00	Q
4	Ayanna Hutchinson	Trinidad and Tobago	12.11	Q
5	Natalya Drozdova	Russia	12.15	q
6	Ana Caicedo	Ecuador	12.51	
7	Rachel Rogers	Fiji	12.73	
8	Natalie Martindale	Saint Vincent and the Grenadines	12.92	

== Participation ==
According to an unofficial count, 45 athletes from 35 countries participated in the event.

- Azerbaijan (1)
- Bahamas (1)
- Bulgaria (2)
- Canada (1)
- China (1)
- Chinese Taipei (1)
- Côte d'Ivoire (1)
- Cuba (1)
- Czech Republic (2)
- Ecuador (1)
- Ethiopia (1)
- Fiji (1)
- France (2)
- Germany (2)
- Ghana (1)
- Greece (1)
- Italy (2)
- Jamaica (2)
- Japan (1)
- Kazakhstan (1)
- Moldova (1)
- Nepal (1)
- New Zealand (2)
- Nigeria (2)
- Russia (1)
- Saint Vincent and the Grenadines (1)
- San Marino (1)
- São Tomé and Príncipe (1)
- Seychelles (1)
- South Africa (2)
- South Korea (1)
- Sweden (1)
- Trinidad and Tobago (1)
- United States (2)
- Uzbekistan (1)
