= Karin Mayr-Krifka =

Austrian sprinter

Karin Mayr-Krifka (born 4 June 1971, in St. Valentin) is a retired Austrian sprinter who specialized in the 100 and 200 metres.

== Competition record ==
| Year | Competition | Venue | Position | Event | Notes |
Representing Austria
| 1994 | European Championships | Helsinki, Finland | — | 4 × 100 m relay | DNF |
| 1997 | World Indoor Championships | Paris, France | 20th (h) | 60 m | 7.44 |
| 1998 | European Indoor Championships | Valencia, Spain | 17th (h) | 60 m | 7.42 |
| 1998 | European Indoor Championships | Valencia, Spain | 14th (sf) | 200 m | 24.33 |
| 2000 | European Indoor Championships | Ghent, Belgium | 15th (sf) | 60 m | 7.35 |
| 2000 | Olympic Games | Sydney, Australia | 30th (h) | 100 m | 11.50 |
| 2000 | Olympic Games | Sydney, Australia | 43rd (h) | 200 m | 23.90 |
| 2001 | World Indoor Championships | Lisbon, Portugal | 15th (sf) | 60 m | 7.33 |
| 2001 | World Indoor Championships | Lisbon, Portugal | 9th (sf) | 200 m | 23.52 |
| 2001 | World Championships | Edmonton, Canada | 29th (h) | 200 m | 24.38 |
| 2002 | European Indoor Championships | Vienna, Austria | 4th | 60 m | 7.22 |
| 2002 | European Indoor Championships | Vienna, Austria | 2nd | 200 m | 22.70 |
| 2002 | European Championships | Munich, Germany | 14th (sf) | 100 m | 11.52 |
| 2002 | European Championships | Munich, Germany | 6th | 200 m | 23.06 |
| 2002 | European Championships | Munich, Germany | 13th (h) | 4 × 100 m relay | 45.05 |
| 2003 | World Indoor Championships | Birmingham, United Kingdom | 5th | 60 m | 7.23 |
| 2003 | World Championships | Paris, France | 16th (qf) | 100 m | 11.34 |
| 2003 | World Championships | Paris, France | 20th (qf) | 200 m | 23.30 |
| 2004 | World Indoor Championships | Budapest, Hungary | 3rd | 200 m | 23.18 |
| 2004 | Olympic Games | Athens, Greece | 29th (qf) | 100 m | 11.55 |
| 2004 | Olympic Games | Athens, Greece | 18th (qf) | 200 m | 23.19 |
| 2005 | European Indoor Championships | Madrid, Spain | 2nd | 200 m | 22.94 |
| 2005 | World Championships | Helsinki, Finland | 23rd (h) | 200 m | 24.61 |

=== Personal bests ===
- 100 metres - 11.15 s (2003)
- 200 metres - 22.70 s (2002)
- Long jump - 6.31 m (2002)
- 4 x 100 metres relay - 44.63 seconds, national record
