= Aksel Gürcan Demirtaş =

Turkish sprinter (born 1973)

Personal information
- Born: 2 January 1973 (age 53) Varna, Bulgaria

Sport
- Sport: Track and field

Aksel Gürcan Demirtaş (born 2 January 1973) is a Turkish athlete specialising in the sprinting events. During her long career, she has represented Turkey at multiple international competitions, including the 1997 World Championships, six World Indoor Championships, three European outdoor and five indoor championships, although with little success.

Her 50 metres personal best of 6.21 seconds is the still standing national record.

== Competition record ==
Year	Competition	Venue	Position	Event	Notes
Representing Turkey
1994	European Indoor Championships	Paris, France	24th (h)	60 m	7.61
1994	European Indoor Championships	Paris, France	–	200 m	DQ
1994	European Championships	Helsinki, Finland	30th (h)	100 m	11.81
1994	European Championships	Helsinki, Finland	31st (h)	200 m	24.40
1995	World Indoor Championships	Barcelona, Spain	33rd (h)	60 m	7.50
1995	World Indoor Championships	Barcelona, Spain	16th (h)	200 m	24.36
1995	Universiade	Fukuoka, Japan	18th (qf)	100 m	11.93
1995	Universiade	Fukuoka, Japan	22nd (qf)	200 m	24.45
1996	European Indoor Championships	Stockholm, Sweden	18th (h)	60 m	7.62
1996	European Indoor Championships	Stockholm, Sweden	15th (h)	200 m	24.84
1997	World Indoor Championships	Paris, France	31st (h)	60 m	7.71
1997	Mediterranean Games	Bari, Italy	6th	100 m	11.59
1998	European Indoor Championships	Valencia, Spain	21st (h)	60 m	7.54
1998	European Indoor Championships	Valencia, Spain	22nd (h)	200 m	24.45
1998	European Championships	Budapest, Hungary	20th (h)	100 m	11.68
2001	World Indoor Championships	Lisbon, Portugal	26th (h)	60 m	7.43
2001	Mediterranean Games	Radès, Tunisia	6th	100 m	11.74
2001	Mediterranean Games	Radès, Tunisia	7th	200 m	24.15
2002	European Indoor Championships	Vienna, Austria	19th (h)	60 m	7.49
2002	European Indoor Championships	Vienna, Austria	14th (h)	200 m	23.82^{1}
2002	European Championships	Munich, Germany	27th (h)	100 m	11.98
2004	World Indoor Championships	Budapest, Hungary	29th (h)	60 m	7.56
2006	World Indoor Championships	Moscow, Russia	23rd (sf)	60 m	7.78
2013	European Indoor Championships	Gothenburg, Sweden	22nd (h)	60 m	7.66
2013	Mediterranean Games	Mersin, Turkey	5th	4x100 m relay	46.24

^{1}Did not finish in the semifinals

== Personal bests ==
Outdoor

- 100 metres – 11.49 (+1.8 m/s) (Kalamáta 2001)
- 200 metres – 23.71 (Ankara 1999)

Indoor

- 60 metres – 7.27 (Moscow 2001)
- 200 metres – 23.79 (Piraeus 2002)
