= Galina Malchugina =

Russian sprinter

Personal information
- Born: 17 December 1962 (age 63) Bryansk, Soviet Union

Sport
- Sport: Track and field
Medal record
Representing Soviet Union / Russia
Olympic Games
Silver medal – second place	1992 Barcelona	4 × 100 m relay
Bronze medal – third place	1988 Seoul	4 × 100 m relay
World Championships
Gold medal – first place	1993 Stuttgart	4 × 100 m relay
Silver medal – second place	1991 Tokyo	4 × 100 m relay
Bronze medal – third place	1995 Gothenburg	200 m
European Championships
Silver medal – second place	1994 Helsinki	4 × 100 m relay
Bronze medal – third place	1990 Split	200 m
Bronze medal – third place	1994 Helsinki	200 m
Bronze medal – third place	1998 Budapest	4 × 100 m relay
Summer Universiade
Gold medal – first place	1989 Duisburg	200 m
Silver medal – second place	1989 Duisburg	4 x 100 m relay

Galina Vyacheslavovna Malchugina (Russian: Галина Вячеславовна Мальчугина, born 17 December 1962) is a retired sprinter from Russia. Competing for the Soviet (later Unified Team, later Russian) relay team, she won medals at the 1988 and 1992 Olympics. In the individual distance 200 metres her success came mostly on European level, although she won a bronze medal at the 1995 World Championships.

Her daughter Yuliya Chermoshanskaya won a gold medal in 4 × 100 metre relay at the 2008 Summer Olympics but was later stripped of this medal due to doping charges.

== Personal bests ==
- 100 metres - 10.96 (1992)
- 200 metres - 22.18 (1996)

== International competitions ==
Year	Competition	Venue	Position	Event	Time	Notes
Representing the Soviet Union
1988	Olympic Games	Seoul, South Korea	8th	200 m	22.42	
1988	Olympic Games	Seoul, South Korea	3rd	4 × 100 m relay	42.75	
1989	Universiade	Duisburg, Germany	1st	200 m	22.70	
1989	Universiade	Duisburg, Germany	2nd	4 × 100 m relay	43.25	
1989	World Cup	Barcelona, Spain	5th	200 m	23.12	
1989	World Cup	Barcelona, Spain	2nd	4 × 100 m relay	42.76	
1990	European Indoor Championships	Glasgow, United Kingdom	3rd	200 metres	23.04	
1990	European Championships	Split, Yugoslavia	3rd	200 m	22.23	wind: +0.3 m/s
1990	European Championships	Split, Yugoslavia	—	4 × 100 m relay	DNF	
1991	World Championships	Tokyo, Japan	5th	200 m	22.66	
1991	World Championships	Tokyo, Japan	2nd	4 × 100 m relay	42.20	
Representing Unified Team
1992	Olympic Games	Barcelona, Spain	8th	200 m	22.63	
1992	Olympic Games	Barcelona, Spain	2nd	4 × 100 m relay	42.16	
Representing Russia
1993	World Championships	Stuttgart, Germany	7th	200 m	22.50	
1993	World Championships	Stuttgart, Germany	1st	4 × 100 m relay	41.49	
1994	European Indoor Championships	Paris, France	1st	200 m	22.41	
1994	European Championships	Helsinki, Finland	3rd	200 m	22.90	wind: +0.2 m/s
1994	European Championships	Helsinki, Finland	2nd	4 × 100 m relay	42.96	
1995	World Championships	Gothenburg, Sweden	3rd	200 m	22.37	
1996	Olympic Games	Atlanta, United States	5th	200 m	22.45	
1996	Olympic Games	Atlanta, United States	4th	4 × 100 m relay	42.27	
1998	European Championships	Budapest, Hungary	3rd	4 × 100 m relay	42.73	
