= Du Xiujie =

Chinese sprinter (born 1971)

Personal information
- Nationality: Chinese
- Born: 5 November 1971 (age 54)

Sport
- Sport: Sprinting
- Event: 200 metres
Medal record
Representing China
Summer Universiade
Gold medal – first place	1995 Fukuoka	200m

Du Xiujie (born 5 November 1971) is a Chinese sprinter. She competed in the women's 200 metres at the 1996 Summer Olympics.
