= Tetyana Bonenko =

Ukrainian sprinter

Tetyana Bonenko, née Lukyanenko (born 7 June 1976) is a retired Ukrainian sprinter who specialized in the 200 metres.

In the 4 x 100 metres relay she finished fourth at the 1998 European Championships. At the same championships the competed in the 200 metres without reaching the final. She became Ukrainian champion once; in 1998.

Her personal best times are 11.50 seconds in the 100 metres, achieved in June 2000 in Kyiv; and 23.06 seconds in the 200 metres, achieved in June 2000 in Kyiv.
