= Mary Tombiri =

Nigerian sprinter

Personal information
- Born: 23 July 1972 (age 54)

Sport
- Sport: Track and field
Medal record
Representing Nigeria
Commonwealth Games
| Gold medal – first place | 1994 Victoria | 4x100 m relay |
Summer Universiade
| Silver medal – second place | 1993 Buffalo | 4x100 m relay |
| Bronze medal – third place | 1995 Fukuoka | 100 m |
| Bronze medal – third place | 1995 Fukuoka | 4x100 m relay |
African Championships
| Gold medal – first place | 1990 Cairo | 4×100 m relay |
| Silver medal – second place | 1992 Belle Vue Harel | 4×100 m relay |
| Bronze medal – third place | 1990 Cairo | 100 m |

Mary Tombiri (born 23 July 1972) is a retired female track and field sprinter from Nigeria. At the 1994 Commonwealth Games she, together with Faith Idehen, Christy Opara-Thompson and Mary Onyali, won the gold medal in 4 x 100 metres relay.

== Achievements ==
| Year | Competition | Venue | Position | Event | Notes |
Representing Nigeria
| 1990 | African Championships | Cairo, Egypt | 3rd | 100 m | 11.74 s |
| 1994 | Commonwealth Games | Victoria, Canada | 1st | 4 × 100 m relay | 42.99 s |
| 1995 | All-Africa Games | Harare, Zimbabwe | 3rd | 100 m | 11.40 s |
