= Ekaterini Thanou =

Greek sprinter (born 1975)

Personal information
- Nationality: Greek
- Born: 1 February 1975 (age 51) Athens, Greece
- Height: 1.65 m (5 ft 5 in)

Sport
- Country: Greece
- Sport: Track and field
- Events: 100 metres, 60 metres

Achievements and titles
- Personal bests: 10.83 sec, 6.96 sec
Medal record
Olympic Games
Silver medal – second place	2000 Sydney	100 m (Note: Thanou's silver medal was not upgraded to gold, because of her involvement in a doping controversy on the eve of the 2004 Summer Olympics in Athens, Greece.)
World Championships
Silver medal – second place	2001 Edmonton	100 m
Bronze medal – third place	1999 Sevilla	100 m
Bronze medal – third place	2003 Paris	100 m
World Indoor Championships
Gold medal – first place	1999 Maebashi	60 m
European Championships
Gold medal – first place	2002 Munich	100 m
Bronze medal – third place	1998 Budapest	100 m
European Indoor Championships
Gold medal – first place	1996 Stockholm	60 m
Gold medal – first place	2000 Ghent	60 m
Mediterranean Games
Gold medal – first place	1997 Bari	100 m
Silver medal – second place	1997 Bari	4 × 100 m relay
Summer Universiade
Gold medal – first place	1997 Catania	100 m
Silver medal – second place	1995 Fukuoka	100 m

Ekaterini Thanou (Greek: Αικατερίνη Θάνου, [ekateˈrini ˈθanu]; born 1 February 1975), also known as Katerina Thanou, is a Greek former sprinter. She won numerous medals in the 100 metres, including an Olympic silver medal at the 2000 Summer Olympics in Sydney, Australia, while she was the 2002 European champion in Munich, Germany. She had also been crowned world and European champion in the 60 metres at the indoor championships.

In 2007, Marion Jones, who won in the 100 metres at the 2000 Olympics leaving Thanou in the second place, admitted that she had used steroids and her gold medal was withdrawn by the International Olympic Committee, but was not reallocated to Thanou because she was also involved in doping.

She was named the Greek Female Athlete of the Year, for the years 1995, 2000, 2001 and 2002.

== Suspension ==
For the 2004 Summer Olympics, Thanou was one of the main hopes of the home crowd for winning an athletics medal. However, on the day prior to the opening ceremony, Thanou and her training partner Konstantinos Kenteris failed to attend a drugs test, and later the same night were hospitalised, claiming they had both been injured in a motorcycle accident. In the ensuing doping scandal, Kenteris and Thanou announced their withdrawal from the Games on 18 August after a hearing before the Disciplinary Commission of the IOC, for what they described to be "in the interests of the country." An official Greek investigation into their alleged accident ruled that it had been staged and the pair were criminally charged with making false statements to authorities.

The missed test in Athens was the duo's third violation of the summer and they were consequently provisionally suspended by the IAAF on 22 December 2004. In June 2005, however, the athletes were cleared of all charges by the Greek athletics federation. Their coach Christos Tzekos was blamed for the missed tests and suspended for four years, but was cleared on separate allegations of distributing banned substances. After a long legal battle, on 26 June 2006 prior to a final ruling by the Court of Arbitration for Sport, the athletes reached an out of court settlement with the IAAF accepting anti-doping rule violations of 3 missed tests between 27 July and 12 August 2004 (in breach of Rule 32.2(d)) and a failure to provide a urine and a blood sample on 12 August 2004 (in breach of Rule 32.2(c)). In return, the more serious charges against them, those of evasion and refusal to provide a sample, were dropped. They have been eligible to compete since 22 December 2006.

== Return from suspension ==
On her return to international competition at the European Athletics Indoor Championships in Birmingham, England, she was booed by the crowds before finishing sixth in the final of 60 metres with 7.26.

Following the revelations about Marion Jones's use of steroids, Thanou, who finished 2nd behind Jones in the 100 m at Sydney 2000, was in line to be awarded the American's gold medal, but due to Thanou's own tainted record the IOC, after two years of deliberation, opted to punish Jones without rewarding Thanou. Jones' gold medal was withdrawn but was withheld by the IOC, Thanou remaining a silver medallist.

Thanou was provisionally selected by the Hellenic Olympic Committee to compete at the 2008 Summer Olympics in Beijing. She had not achieved the Olympic 'A' standard (11.32 seconds), but as no other Greek woman had achieved this, she was selected as part of the team.

However, all of this became moot on 9 August 2008, when the executive board of the IOC decided to bar Thanou from competing under rule 23.2.1 of the Olympic charter. This rule allows the banning of athletes who are thought to be guilty of improper conduct or bringing the games into disrepute. Thanou claimed that she faced "intense pressure" to withdraw from the Beijing Olympics, four years after being involved in a major doping controversy at the Athens Games. Thanou qualified for the Beijing Games, and although she had threatened to sue Jacques Rogge, the IOC president, she was finally denied permission to participate.

== Conviction and subsequent acquittal ==
Thanou was tried in 2009 for making false statements to police, to avoid a doping test, on the eve of the 2004 Athens Olympics. On 9 May 2011, Thanou and Kenteris were convicted of perjury and received suspended sentences of 31 months against which they immediately appealed. The judge declared that the "motor accident at the Olympic Games in reality had never taken place". On 6 September 2011, the Guardian newspaper reported that Kostas Kenteris and Katerina Thanou had been acquitted by a Greek appeals court of faking a motorcycle crash after missing a drugs test.

== Personal bests ==
Event	Time	Venue	Date
60 metres	6.96	Maebashi, Japan	7 March 1999
100 metres	10.83	Seville, Spain	22 August 1999

== International competitions ==
Year	Competition	Venue	Position	Event	Notes
Representing Greece
1994	World Junior Championships	Lisbon, Portugal	4th	100 m	11.46 (wind: +2.0 m/s)
1994	European Championships	Helsinki, Finland	20th (qf)	100 m	11.68 (wind: 0.9 m/s)
1994	European Championships	Helsinki, Finland	10th (h)	4 × 100 m relay	44.77
1995	World University Games	Fukuoka, Japan	2nd	100 m	11.30
1995	World Championships	Gothenburg, Sweden	9th (sf)	100 m	11.09
1996	European Indoor Championships	Stockholm, Sweden	1st	60 m	7.15
1997	World Indoor Championships	Paris, France	7th (sf)	60 m	7.15
1997	World University Games	Catania, Italy	1st	100 m	11.20
1997	Mediterranean Games	Bari, Italy	1st	100 m	11.13
1997	Mediterranean Games	Bari, Italy	2nd	4 × 100 m relay	43.07 NR
1997	World Championships	Athens, Greece	9th (sf)	100 m	11.34
1997	World Championships	Athens, Greece	9th (sf)	4 × 100 m relay	43.15
1998	European Indoor Championships	Valencia, Spain	4th	60 m	7.23
1998	European Championships	Budapest, Hungary	3rd	100 m	10.87 NR
1998	European Championships	Budapest, Hungary	5th	4 × 100 m relay	44.01
1999	World Indoor Championships	Maebashi, Japan	1st	60 m	6.96 NR
1999	World Championships	Seville, Spain	3rd	100 m	10.84
2000	European Indoor Championships	Ghent, Belgium	1st	60 m	7.05
2000	Olympic Games	Sydney, Australia	2nd	100 m	11.12
2000	Olympic Games	Sydney, Australia	13th (sf)	4 × 100 m relay	43.53
2001	World Championships	Edmonton, Canada	2nd	100 m	10.91
2001	World Championships	Edmonton, Canada	6th	4 × 100 m relay	43.25 SB
2002	European Championships	Munich, Germany	1st	100 m	11.10
2002	European Championships	Munich, Germany	9th (sf)	4 × 100 m relay	44.04 SB
2003	World Championships	Paris, France	3rd	100 m	11.03
2003	World Championships	Paris, France	10th (sf)	4 × 100 m relay	43.81
2007	European Indoor Championships	Birmingham, Great Britain	6th	60 m	7.26

== See also ==
- List of doping cases in athletics
