= Frédérique Bangué =

French sprinter

Personal information
- Born: 31 December 1976 (age 49) Lyon, France

Sport
- Sport: Track and field
Medal record
Representing France
World Championships
Silver medal – second place	2001 Edmonton	4x100 m relay
World Indoor Championships
Bronze medal – third place	1997 Paris	60 m
European Championships
Gold medal – first place	1998 Budapest	4×100 m relay
European Indoor Championships
Silver medal – second place	1998 Valencia	60 m
Mediterranean Games
Gold medal – first place	1997 Bari	4x100 m relay
Silver medal – second place	1997 Bari	100 m

Frederique Bangue (born 31 December 1976) is a French sprinter who competed in the 100 metres. Her personal best being 11.16 seconds, she never reached a world-level final individually. However, when competing in the shorter distance of 60 metres (only held indoor) or relay races, she has won medals. She was the silver medallist at the 1997 Mediterranean Games.

== Achievements ==
Year	Competition	Venue	Position	Event	Notes
Representing France
1994	World Junior Championships	Lisbon, Portugal	7th	100m	11.57 (wind: +2.0 m/s)
1994	World Junior Championships	Lisbon, Portugal	—	4 × 100 m relay	DQ
1997	World Indoor Championships	Paris, France	3rd	60 m	7.17
1998	European Indoor Championships	Valencia, Spain	2nd	60 m	7.18
1998	European Championships	Budapest, Hungary	1st	4 × 100 m relay	42.59
2001	World Championships	Edmonton, Canada	2nd	4 × 100 m relay	42.39
