= Jerneja Perc =

Slovenian sprinter

Personal information
- Born: 17 February 1971 Celje, Yugoslavia
- Died: 29 November 2009 (aged 38) Celje, Slovenia

Sport
- Sport: Track and field
Medal record
Representing Slovenia
European Indoor Championships
Bronze medal – third place	1996 Stockholm	60 m

Jerneja Perc (17 February 1971 – 29 November 2009) was a Slovenian sprinter who specialized in the 100 metres. She competed in the women's 100 metres at the 1996 Summer Olympics.

She won a bronze medal in 60 metres at the 1996 European Indoor Championships.

She participated at the 1995 World Indoor Championships, the 1995 World Championships and the 1997 World Indoor Championships without reaching the finals.

She died on 29 November 2009 after a long illness.
