= Zlatka Georgieva =

Bulgarian sprinter (born 1969)

Personal information
- Born: 20 July 1969 (age 57) Varna, Bulgaria

Sport
- Sport: Track and field
Medal record
Representing Bulgaria
European Indoor Championships
| Bronze medal – third place | 1996 Stockholm | 200 m |
Summer Universiade
| Bronze medal – third place | 1995 Fukuoka | 200 m |

Zlatka Yaneva Georgieva (Bulgarian: Златка Георгиева) (born 20 July 1969) is a retired Bulgarian sprinter who specialized in the women's 200 metres.

== Achievements ==
| Year | Competition | Venue | Position | Event | Notes |
Representing Bulgaria
| 1994 | European Championships | Helsinki, Finland | 8th | 200 m | 23.46 (wind: +0.2 m/s) |
| 1995 | World Indoor Championships | Barcelona, Spain | 5th | 200 m | 23.36 |
| 1995 | Universiade | Fukuoka, Japan | 3rd | 200 m | 23.04 |
| 1996 | European Indoor Championships | Stockholm, Sweden | 3rd | 200 m | 23.40 |
