= Viktoriya Fomenko =

Ukrainian sprinter

Personal information
- Born: 2 October 1970 (age 56)

Sport
- Sport: Track and field
Medal record
Representing Ukraine
Summer Universiade
Bronze medal – third place	1995 Fukuoka	4x400m relay

Viktoriya Viktorivna Fomenko (Ukrainian: Вікторія Фоменко, born 2 October 1970) is a retired Ukrainian sprinter who specialized in the 200 metres.

She competed at the 1994 European Championships, the 1995 World Indoor Championships, and the 1996 Olympic Games without reaching the final. In the 4 x 100 metres relay she finished fourth at the 1994 European Championships. She was also a part of the disqualified Ukrainian team at the 1997 World Championships. In the 4 x 400 metres relay she competed at the 1995 World Championships and the 1996 Olympic Games without reaching the final.

Her personal best times are 11.37 seconds in the 100 metres, achieved in May 1993 in Kyiv; 22.59 seconds in the 200 metres, achieved in June 1996 in Kyiv; and 50.94 seconds in the 400 metres, achieved in May 1996 in Kyiv.
