= Tamara Shanidze =

Georgian sprinter

Personal information
- Nationality: Georgian
- Born: 5 July 1969 (age 56)
- Height: 1.70 m (5 ft 7 in)
- Weight: 66 kg (146 lb)

Sport
- Sport: Sprinting
- Event: 100 metres

Tamara Shanidze (Georgian: თამარა შანიძე; born 5 July 1969) is a Georgian sprinter. She competed in the women's 100 metres at the 2000 Summer Olympics.
