= 1996 European Athletics Indoor Championships =

- Dates: 8–10 March
- Host city: Stockholm; Sweden
- Venue: Globe Arena
- Events: 26
- Participation: 463 athletes from 44 nations

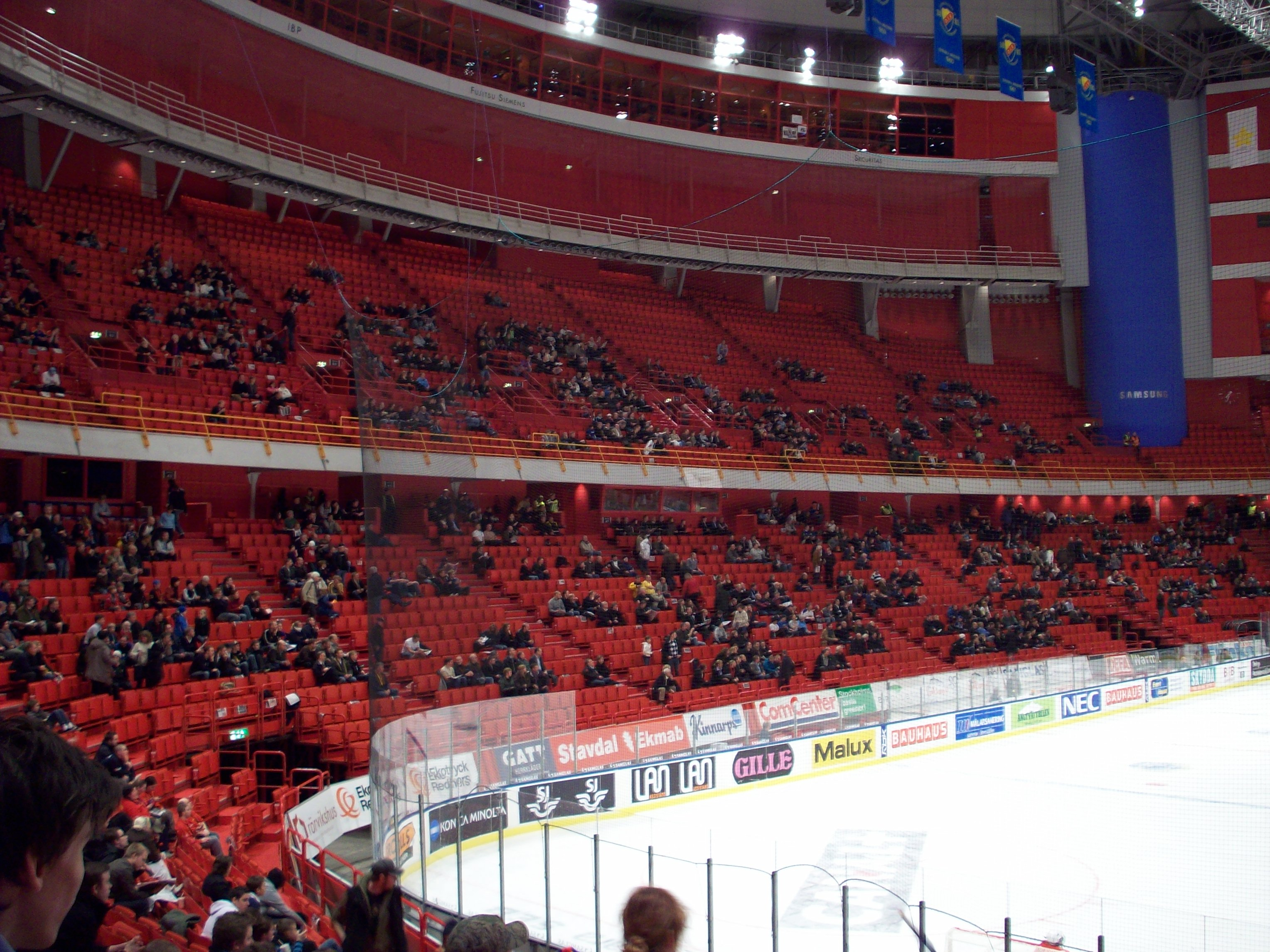
The host venue (shown during an ice hockey game)

The 1996 European Athletics Indoor Championships were held at the Globe Arena, Stockholm, the capital city of Sweden from Friday, 8 March to Sunday, 10 March 1996.

This was the first edition to feature women's pole vault.

== Medal summary ==
=== Men ===
Event	Gold		Silver		Bronze	
60 metres	Marc Blume (GER)	6.62	Jason John (GBR)	6.64	Peter Karlsson (SWE)	6.64
200 metres	Erik Wijmeersch (BEL)	21.04	Alexis Alexopoulos (GRE)	21.05	Torbjörn Eriksson (SWE)	21.07
400 metres	Du'aine Ladejo (GBR)	46.12	Pierre-Marie Hilaire (FRA)	46.82	Ashraf Saber (ITA)	46.86
800 metres	Roberto Parra (ESP)	1:47.74	Giuseppe D'Urso (ITA)	1:48.04	Wojciech Kałdowski (POL)	1:48.40
1500 metres	Mateo Cañellas (ESP)	3:44.50	Anthony Whiteman (GBR)	3:44.78	Abdelkader Chékhémani (FRA)	3:45.96
3000 metres	Anacleto Jiménez (ESP)	7:50.06	Christophe Impens (BEL)	7:50.19	Panagiotis Papoulias (GRE)	7:50.80
60 metres hurdles	Igors Kazanovs (LAT)	7.59	Guntis Peders (LAT)	7.65	Jonathan Nsenga (BEL)	7.66
High jump	Dragutin Topić (FR Yugoslavia)	2.35	Leonid Pumalainen (RUS)	2.33	Steinar Hoen (NOR)	2.31
Pole vault	Dmitriy Markov (BLR)	5.85	Viktor Chistyakov (RUS)	5.80	Pyotr Bochkaryov (RUS)	5.80
Long jump	Mattias Sunneborn (SWE)	8.06	Bogdan Tarus (ROM)	8.03	Spyridon Vasdekis (GRE)	8.03
Triple jump	Māris Bružiks (LAT)	16.97	Francis Agyepong (GBR)	16.93	Armen Martirosyan (ARM)	16.74
Shot put	Paolo Dal Soglio (ITA)	20.50	Dirk Urban (GER)	20.04	Oliver-Sven Buder (GER)	19.91
Heptathlon	Erki Nool (EST)	6188	Tomáš Dvořák (CZE)	6114	Jón Arnar Magnússon (ISL)	6069

=== Women ===
Event	Gold		Silver		Bronze	
60 metres	Ekaterini Thanou (GRE)	7.15	Odiah Sidibé (FRA)	7.15	Jerneja Perc (SLO)	7.28
200 metres	Sandra Myers (ESP)	23.15	Erika Suchovská (CZE)	23.16	Zlatka Georgieva (BUL)	23.40
400 metres	Grit Breuer (GER)	50.81	Olga Kotlyarova (RUS)	51.70	Tatyana Chebykina (RUS)	51.71
800 metres	Patricia Djaté (FRA)	2:01.71	Stella Jongmans (NED)	2:01.88	Svetlana Masterkova (RUS)	2:02.61
1500 metres	Carla Sacramento (POR)	4:08.95	Yekaterina Podkopayeva (RUS)	4:09.65	Małgorzata Rydz (POL)	4:10.50
3000 metres	Fernanda Ribeiro (POR)	8:39.48	Sara Wedlund (SWE)	8:50.32	Marta Domínguez (ESP)	8:53.34
60 metres hurdles	Patricia Girard-Léno (FRA)	7.89	Brigita Bukovec (SLO)	7.90	Monique Tourret (FRA)	8.09
High jump	Alina Astafei (GER)	1.98	Níki Bakogiánni (GRE)	1.96	Olga Bolşova (MDA)	1.94 NR
Pole vault	Vala Flosadóttir (ISL)	4.16	Christine Adams (GER)	4.05	Gabriela Mihalcea (ROM)	4.05
Long jump	Renata Nielsen (DEN)	6.76	Yelena Sinchukova (RUS)	6.75	Claudia Gerhardt (GER)	6.74
Triple jump	Iva Prandzheva (BUL)	14.54	Šárka Kašpárková (CZE)	14.50	Ólga Vasdéki (GRE)	14.30
Shot put	Astrid Kumbernuss (GER)	19.79	Irina Khudoroshkina (RUS)	19.07	Valentina Fedyushina (UKR)	18.90
Pentathlon	Yelena Lebedenko (RUS)	4685	Urszula Włodarczyk (POL)	4597	Irina Vostrikova (RUS)	4545

== Medal table ==
Rank	Nation	Gold	Silver	Bronze	Total
1	Germany (GER)	4	2	2	8
2	Spain (ESP)	4	0	1	5
3	France (FRA)	2	2	2	6
4	Latvia (LAT)	2	1	0	3
5	Portugal (POR)	2	0	0	2
6	Russia (RUS)	1	6	4	11
7	Great Britain (GBR)	1	3	0	4
8	Greece (GRE)	1	2	3	6
9	Sweden (SWE)	1	1	2	4
10	Belgium (BEL)	1	1	1	3
10	Italy (ITA)	1	1	1	3
12	Bulgaria (BUL)	1	0	1	2
12	Iceland (ISL)	1	0	1	2
14	Belarus (BLR)	1	0	0	1
14	Denmark (DEN)	1	0	0	1
14	Estonia (EST)	1	0	0	1
14	Yugoslavia (FR Yugoslavia)	1	0	0	1
18	Czech Republic (CZE)	0	3	0	3
19	Poland (POL)	0	1	2	3
20	Romania (ROM)	0	1	1	2
20	Slovenia (SLO)	0	1	1	2
22	Netherlands (NED)	0	1	0	1
23	Armenia (ARM)	0	0	1	1
23	Moldova (MDA)	0	0	1	1
23	Norway (NOR)	0	0	1	1
23	Ukraine (UKR)	0	0	1	1
Totals (26 entries)		26	26	26	78

== Participating nations ==
- Albania (1)
- Andorra (1)
- Armenia (2)
- Austria (9)
- Belarus (9)
- Belgium (7)
- Bosnia and Herzegovina (1)
- Bulgaria (15)
- Croatia (3)
- Cyprus (5)
- Czech Republic (18)
- Denmark (4)
- Estonia (8)
- Finland (7)
- France (37)
- Georgia (1)
- Germany (33)
- Great Britain (25)
- Greece (24)
- Hungary (7)
- Iceland (4)
- Israel (3)
- Ireland (12)
- Italy (23)
- Latvia (8)
- Lithuania (4)
- Macedonia (2)
- Malta (2)
- Moldova (5)
- Netherlands (6)
- Norway (8)
- Poland (12)
- Portugal (7)
- Romania (18)
- Russia (33)
- San Marino (1)
- Slovakia (2)
- Slovenia (11)
- Spain (28)
- Sweden (23)
- Switzerland (8)
- Turkey (7)
- Ukraine (15)
- Yugoslavia (4)
