= Ameerah Bello =

American sprinter (born 1975)

Personal information
- Full name: Ameerah Anakaona Bello
- Nationality: American Virgin Islander
- Born: October 3, 1975 (age 51)
- Height: 1.65 m (5 ft 5 in)
- Weight: 54 kg (119 lb)

Sport
- Sport: Sprinting
- Event: 100 metres
- College team: Morgan State Bears

Ameerah Anakaona Bello (born October 3, 1975) is a sprinter who represents the United States Virgin Islands. She competed in the women's 100 metres at the 2000 Summer Olympics.

Bello competed for the Morgan State Bears track and field team in the NCAA.
