= Odiah Sidibé =

French sprint athlete of Guinean descent (born 1970)

Medal record

Women's Athletics

Representing France

World Championships
Silver medal – second place	2001 Edmonton	4 × 100 m relay

Odiah Sidibé (born 13 January 1970 in Fréjus, Var) is a French sprint athlete of Guinean descent.

== Achievements ==
- 2002 European Championships in Athletics – gold medal (4 × 100 m relay)
- 2002 European Championships in Athletics – seventh place (100 m)
- 2001 World Championships in Athletics – silver medal (4 × 100 m relay)
- 1994 Jeux de la Francophonie – silver medal (100 m)
