= Lucrécia Jardim =

Portuguese sprinter (born 1971)

Personal information
- Full name: Maria Lucrécia Jardim
- Born: 28 January 1971 (age 55) Caconga, Portuguese Angola
- Height: 159 cm (5 ft 3 in)
- Weight: 49 kg (108 lb)

Sport
- Sport: Athletics
- Event(s): 100 metres, 200 metres

Maria Lucrécia Jardim (born 28 January 1971 in Caconga, Portuguese Angola) is a retired Portuguese sprinter who specialized in the 100 and 200 metres.

== Achievements ==
Year	Competition	Venue	Position	Event	Notes
Representing Portugal
1988	World Junior Championships	Sudbury, Canada	16th (sf)	100m	11.96 (wind: -0.7 m/s)
1988	World Junior Championships	Sudbury, Canada	17th (sf)	200m	24.32 w (wind: +2.1 m/s)
1990	World Junior Championships	Plovdiv, Bulgaria	3rd	100 m	11.52 (wind: +0.9 m/s)
1990	World Junior Championships	Plovdiv, Bulgaria	3rd	200 m	23.26 (wind: +1.3 m/s)
1990	Ibero-American Championships	Manaus, Brazil	4th	100m	11.76 (wind: +0.6 m/s)
1990	Ibero-American Championships	Manaus, Brazil	2nd	200m	23.82 (wind: -0.1 m/s)
1990	European Championships	Split, Yugoslavia	17th (h)	100 m	11.73 (wind: +0.1 m/s)
1990	European Championships	Split, Yugoslavia	15th (sf)	200 m	23.58 (wind: +0.2 m/s)
1992	Olympic Games	Barcelona, Spain	quarter-final	100 m	11.66
1992	Olympic Games	Barcelona, Spain	quarter-final	200 m	23.09
1992	Olympic Games	Barcelona, Spain	4 × 400 m	8th	3:36.85
1994	European Championships	Helsinki, Finland	17th (qf)	100 m	11.57 (wind: +1.2 m/s)
1994	European Championships	Helsinki, Finland	7th	200 m	23.28 (wind: +0.2 m/s)
1996	Olympic Games	Atlanta, United States	semi-final	100 m	11.32
1996	Olympic Games	Atlanta, United States	quarter-final	200 m	22.88
