= Maia Azarashvili =

Georgian sprinter (born 1964)

Maia Azarashvili (Georgian: მაია აზარაშვილი; born 6 April 1964) is a Georgian retired sprinter who specialized in the 200 metres, representing the USSR and Georgia (since 1992). She was born in Tbilisi.

Azarashvili was a semi-finalist at the 1987 World Championships in Rome. At the 1988 Olympic Games, she finished seventh in the 200 metres and then won a bronze medal as a member of the Soviet Union 4×100 metres relay squad (she ran in the heats but not the final).

Representing Georgia, Azarashvili went on to finish fifth at the 1994 European Championships in Helsinki. She competed at the World Championships in 1993 and 1995 without reaching the finals there.
