= Ekaterini Koffa =

Greek sprinter

Personal information
- Born: 10 April 1969 (age 57) Karditsa, Greece

Sport
- Country: Greece
- Sport: Athletics
- Events: 200 metres 100 metres, 60 metres

Achievements and titles
- Personal bests: 22.67 s, 22.71 s (i)
Medal record
Representing Greece
World Indoor Championships
| Gold medal – first place | 1997 Paris | 200 m |
European Indoor Championships
| Bronze medal – third place | 1998 Valencia | 200 m |
Mediterranean Games
| Silver medal – second place | 1997 Bari | 200 m |
| Silver medal – second place | 1997 Bari | 4x100 m relay |
| Bronze medal – third place | 1991 Athens | 4x100 m relay |
| Bronze medal – third place | 1993 Narbonne | 100 m |

Ekaterini "Katerina" Koffa (Greek: Αικατερίνη (Κατερίνα) Κόφφα, born April 10, 1969) is a retired Greek sprinter who won the 200 metres at the 1997 IAAF World Indoor Championships. Koffa still holds the indoor and outdoor Greek records in 200 metres.

== Honours ==
| Year | Competition | Venue | Position | Event | Notes |
Representing Greece
| 1991 | Mediterranean Games | Athens, Greece | 3rd | 4 × 100 m relay | 44.77 |
| 1993 | Mediterranean Games | Narbonne, France | 3rd | 100 m | 11.71 |
| 1994 | European Championships | Helsinki, Finland | 25th (h) | 100 m | 11.71 (wind: -0.6 m/s) |
| 1994 | European Championships | Helsinki, Finland | 10th (h) | 4 × 100 m relay | 44.77 |
| 1997 | World Indoor Championships | Paris, France | 1st | 200 m | 22.76 NR |
| 1997 | Mediterranean Games | Bari, Italy | 2nd | 200 m | 22.80 |
| 1997 | Mediterranean Games | Bari, Italy | 2nd | 4 × 100 m relay | 43.07 NR |
| 1997 | World Championships | Athens, Greece | 9th (sf) | 200 m | 22.70 SB |
| 1997 | World Championships | Athens, Greece | 9th (sf) | 4 × 100 m relay | 43.15 |
| 1998 | European Indoor Championships | Valencia, Spain | 5th | 60 m | 7.24 |
| 1998 | European Indoor Championships | Valencia, Spain | 3rd | 200 m | 22.86 |
| 1998 | European Championships | Budapest, Hungary | 5th | 4 × 100 m relay | 44.01 |
| 2000 | Olympic Games | Sydney, Australia | 13th (sf) | 4 × 100 m relay | 43.53 |
