= 1996 World Junior Championships in Athletics – Women's 4 × 100 metres relay =

The women's 4×100 metres relay event at the 1996 World Junior Championships in Athletics was held in Sydney, Australia, at International Athletic Centre on 25 August.

== Medalists ==
Gold	Andrea Anderson; Lakeesha White; Jernae Wright; Nanceen Perry; United States
Silver	Tulia Robinson; Peta-Gaye Dowdie; Saran Patterson; Aleen Bailey; Jamaica
Bronze	Sandra Abel; Esther Möller; Nancy Kette; Marion Wagner; Germany

== Results ==
=== Final ===
25 August

Rank	Nation	Competitors	Time	Notes
1st place, gold medalist(s)	United States	Andrea Anderson; Lakeesha White; Jernae Wright; Nanceen Perry	43.79	
2nd place, silver medalist(s)	Jamaica	Tulia Robinson; Peta-Gaye Dowdie; Saran Patterson; Aleen Bailey	44.26	
3rd place, bronze medalist(s)	Germany	Sandra Abel; Esther Möller; Nancy Kette; Marion Wagner	44.57	
4	France	Céline Thélamon; Doris Deruel; Nadine Mahobah; Fabé Dia	44.58	
5	Italy	Stefania Ferrante; Irene Daniele; Manuela Grillo; Manuela Levorato	45.27	
6	Australia	Simone Purvis; Tamsyn Lewis; Mindy Slomka; Lauren Hewitt	45.50	
7	Japan	Kozue Motohashi; Kayo Kuramoto; Emiko Toda; Ayumi Shimazaki	45.97	
	United Kingdom	Gosha Rostek; Sarah Wilhelmy; Victoria Shipman; Rebecca Drummond	DNF	

=== Heats ===
25 August

==== Heat 1 ====
Rank	Nation	Competitors	Time	Notes
1	Jamaica	Tulia Robinson; Peta-Gaye Dowdie; Saran Patterson; Aleen Bailey	44.38	Q
2	France	Céline Thélamon; Doris Deruel; Nadine Mahobah; Fabé Dia	44.88	Q
3	Italy	Stefania Ferrante; Irene Daniele; Manuela Grillo; Manuela Levorato	45.29	Q
4	Australia	Mindy Slomka; Lauren Hewitt; Simone Purvis; Rosemary Hayward	45.30	q
	Finland	Niina Saarman; Johanna Manninen; Annika Kumlin; Johanna Halkoaho	DQ	

==== Heat 2 ====
Rank	Nation	Competitors	Time	Notes
1	United States	Andrea Anderson; Lakeesha White; Jernae Wright; Nanceen Perry	44.16	Q
2	Germany	Sandra Abel; Esther Möller; Nancy Kette; Marion Wagner	45.01	Q
3	United Kingdom	Gosha Rostek; Sarah Wilhelmy; Victoria Shipman; Rebecca Drummond	45.49	Q
4	Japan	Kozue Motohashi; Kayo Kuramoto; Emiko Toda; Tomomi Suzuki	45.66	q
5	Czech Republic	Pavla Sichová; Jitka Burianová; Štepánka Klapácová; Gabriela Švecová	45.88	
6	New Zealand	Anna Smythe; Felicity Major; Bryony Barker; Rebecca Murphy	46.11	
7	Canada	Deniece Bell; Natasha Quan-Vie; Veronica Dyer; Margaret Fox	46.65	
8	Indonesia	Meivy Ratnasari; Irene Joseph; Nyoman Rae; Sih Ernawati	47.12	

== Participation ==
According to an unofficial count, 54 athletes from 13 countries participated in the event.

- Australia (5)
- Canada (4)
- Czech Republic (4)
- Finland (4)
- France (4)
- Germany (4)
- Indonesia (4)
- Italy (4)
- Jamaica (4)
- Japan (5)
- New Zealand (4)
- United Kingdom (4)
- United States (4)
