= 1996 World Junior Championships in Athletics – Women's 200 metres =

The women's 200 metres event at the 1996 World Junior Championships in Athletics was held in Sydney, Australia, at International Athletic Centre on 23 and 24 August.

== Medalists ==
Gold	Sylviane Félix; France
Silver	Lauren Hewitt; Australia
Bronze	Nora Ivanova; Bulgaria

== Results ==
=== Final ===
24 August
Wind: -2.2 m/s

Rank	Name	Nationality	Time	Notes
1st place, gold medalist(s)	Sylviane Félix	France	23.16	
2nd place, silver medalist(s)	Lauren Hewitt	Australia	23.32	
3rd place, bronze medalist(s)	Nora Ivanova	Bulgaria	23.59	
4	Agnė Visockaitė	Lithuania	23.75	
5	Fabé Dia	France	23.79	
6	Nanceen Perry	United States	23.81	
7	Kim Gevaert	Belgium	23.88	
8	Johanna Manninen	Finland	23.89	

=== Semifinals ===
24 August

==== Semifinal 1 ====
Rank	Name	Nationality	Time	Notes
1	Sylviane Félix	France	23.59	Q
2	Nora Ivanova	Bulgaria	23.69	Q
3	Johanna Manninen	Finland	23.99	Q
4	Agnė Visockaitė	Lithuania	24.00	Q
5	Crystal Cox	United States	24.24	
6	Jitka Burianová	Czech Republic	24.43	
7	Joan Ekah	Nigeria	24.51	
8	Chen Shu-Chuan	Chinese Taipei	24.60	

==== Semifinal 2 ====
Rank	Name	Nationality	Time	Notes
1	Lauren Hewitt	Australia	23.68	Q
2	Fabé Dia	France	23.76	Q
3	Kim Gevaert	Belgium	23.84	Q
4	Nanceen Perry	United States	23.89	Q
5	Aleen Bailey	Jamaica	24.33	
6	Vera Georgieva	Bulgaria	24.34	
7	Štepánka Klapácová	Czech Republic	24.43	
	Cydonie Mothersill	Cayman Islands	DNS	

=== Quarterfinals ===
23 August

==== Quarterfinal 1 ====
Wind: -0.7 m/s

Rank	Name	Nationality	Time	Notes
1	Agnė Visockaitė	Lithuania	23.68	Q
2	Nora Ivanova	Bulgaria	23.77	Q
3	Crystal Cox	United States	24.17	Q
4	Aleen Bailey	Jamaica	24.23	Q
5	Sarah Wilhelmy	United Kingdom	24.29	
6	Sabrina Mulrain	Germany	24.40	
7	Tomomi Suzuki	Japan	24.49	
	Irina Kartacheva	Ukraine	DNS	

==== Quarterfinal 2 ====
Wind: -0.3 m/s

Rank	Name	Nationality	Time	Notes
1	Fabé Dia	France	23.71	Q
2	Chen Shu-Chuan	Chinese Taipei	24.18	Q
3	Jitka Burianová	Czech Republic	24.27	Q
4	Joan Ekah	Nigeria	24.52	Q
5	Rebecca Murphy	New Zealand	24.66	
6	Tina Matul	Slovenia	24.68	
	Chen Yuxiang	China	DNS	

==== Quarterfinal 3 ====
Wind: -1.2 m/s

Rank	Name	Nationality	Time	Notes
1	Sylviane Félix	France	24.05	Q
2	Kim Gevaert	Belgium	24.11	Q
3	Johanna Manninen	Finland	24.16	Q
4	Vera Georgieva	Bulgaria	24.29	Q
5	Chrísoula Goudenoúdhi	Greece	24.77	
6	Sonia Williams	Antigua and Barbuda	24.87	
7	Isabel Roussow	South Africa	25.02	
8	Margaret Fox	Canada	25.06	

==== Quarterfinal 4 ====
Wind: -3.1 m/s

Rank	Name	Nationality	Time	Notes
1	Nanceen Perry	United States	23.94	Q
2	Lauren Hewitt	Australia	24.11	Q
3	Cydonie Mothersill	Cayman Islands	24.20	Q
4	Štepánka Klapácová	Czech Republic	24.44	Q
5	Victoria Shipman	United Kingdom	24.48	
6	Biljana Mitrović	Yugoslavia	24.72	
7	Natasha Quan-Vie	Canada	25.09	
8	Monika Gosciniak	Germany	25.27	

=== Heats ===
23 August

==== Heat 1 ====
Wind: 0.0 m/s

Rank	Name	Nationality	Time	Notes
1	Chen Yuxiang	China	23.96	Q
2	Manuela Levorato	Italy	24.10	Q
3	Sonia Williams	Antigua and Barbuda	24.39	Q
4	Jitka Burianová	Czech Republic	24.41	Q
5	Aleen Bailey	Jamaica	24.42	q
6	Rebecca Murphy	New Zealand	24.57	q
7	Marcia Daniel	Dominica	25.80	
8	Chamanthi Maligaspe	Sri Lanka	26.71	

==== Heat 2 ====
Wind: -0.3 m/s

Rank	Name	Nationality	Time	Notes
1	Nora Ivanova	Bulgaria	23.78	Q
2	Crystal Cox	United States	23.93	Q
3	Chrísoula Goudenoúdhi	Greece	24.41	Q
4	Cydonie Mothersill	Cayman Islands	24.47	Q
5	Natasha Quan-Vie	Canada	24.60	q
6	Tina Matul	Slovenia	24.63	q
7	Manuela Grillo	Italy	24.80	

==== Heat 3 ====
Wind: -0.1 m/s

Rank	Name	Nationality	Time	Notes
1	Lauren Hewitt	Australia	23.91	Q
2	Kim Gevaert	Belgium	24.00	Q
3	Joan Ekah	Nigeria	24.26	Q
4	Štepánka Klapácová	Czech Republic	24.28	Q
5	Isabel Roussow	South Africa	24.39	q
6	Biljana Mitrović	Yugoslavia	24.61	q
7	Paola Restrepo	Colombia	25.00	

==== Heat 4 ====
Rank	Name	Nationality	Time	Notes
1	Sylviane Félix	France	23.41	Q
2	Johanna Manninen	Finland	23.98	Q
3	Tomomi Suzuki	Japan	24.36	Q
4	Vera Georgieva	Bulgaria	24.49	Q
5	Margaret Fox	Canada	24.74	q
6	Desiree Cooks	Anguilla	25.71	
7	Vaso Papaioannou	Cyprus	25.81	

==== Heat 5 ====
Rank	Name	Nationality	Time	Notes
1	Fabé Dia	France	23.86	Q
2	Agnė Visockaitė	Lithuania	24.08	Q
3	Sabrina Mulrain	Germany	24.45	Q
4	Sarah Wilhelmy	United Kingdom	24.54	Q
5	Justine Bayiga	Uganda	24.75	
6	Li Xuemei	China	25.03	
7	Kasiani Dimopoúlou	Greece	25.26	

==== Heat 6 ====
Wind: -1.1 m/s

Rank	Name	Nationality	Time	Notes
1	Nanceen Perry	United States	23.95	Q
2	Monika Gosciniak	Germany	24.11	Q
3	Victoria Shipman	United Kingdom	24.18	Q
4	Chen Shu-Chuan	Chinese Taipei	24.20	Q
5	Irina Kartacheva	Ukraine	24.73	q
6	Tanya Oxley	Barbados	24.92	
7	Clara Córdoba	Colombia	25.42	

== Participation ==
According to an unofficial count, 43 athletes from 32 countries participated in the event.

- Anguilla (1)
- Antigua and Barbuda (1)
- Australia (1)
- Barbados (1)
- Belgium (1)
- Bulgaria (2)
- Canada (2)
- Cayman Islands (1)
- China (2)
- Chinese Taipei (1)
- Colombia (2)
- Cyprus (1)
- Czech Republic (2)
- Dominica (1)
- Finland (1)
- France (2)
- Germany (2)
- Greece (2)
- Italy (2)
- Jamaica (1)
- Japan (1)
- Lithuania (1)
- New Zealand (1)
- Nigeria (1)
- Slovenia (1)
- South Africa (1)
- Sri Lanka (1)
- Uganda (1)
- Ukraine (1)
- United Kingdom (2)
- United States (2)
- Yugoslavia (1)
