= 1996 World Junior Championships in Athletics – Women's 100 metres =

The women's 100 metres event at the 1996 World Junior Championships in Athletics was held in Sydney, Australia, at International Athletic Centre on 21 and 22 August.

== Medalists ==
Gold	Nora Ivanova; Bulgaria
Silver	Andrea Anderson; United States
Bronze	Esther Möller; Germany

== Results ==
=== Final ===
22 August

Wind: +0.6 m/s

Rank	Name	Nationality	Time	Notes
1st place, gold medalist(s)	Nora Ivanova	Bulgaria	11.32	
2nd place, silver medalist(s)	Andrea Anderson	United States	11.43	
3rd place, bronze medalist(s)	Esther Möller	Germany	11.46	
4	Saran Patterson	Jamaica	11.47	
5	Lakeesha White	United States	11.48	
6	Cydonie Mothersill	Cayman Islands	11.51	
7	Manuela Levorato	Italy	11.54	
8	Lauren Hewitt	Australia	11.55	

=== Semifinals ===
22 August

==== Semifinal 1 ====
Wind: ?.? m/s

Rank	Name	Nationality	Time	Notes
1	Nora Ivanova	Bulgaria	11.46	Q
2	Lakeesha White	United States	11.59	Q
3	Manuela Levorato	Italy	11.72	Q
4	Saran Patterson	Jamaica	11.72	Q
5	Johanna Manninen	Finland	11.76	
6	Agnė Visockaitė	Lithuania	11.78	
7	Marion Wagner	Germany	11.83	
8	Doris Deruel	France	12.21	

==== Semifinal 2 ====
Wind: -0.8 m/s

Rank	Name	Nationality	Time	Notes
1	Andrea Anderson	United States	11.55	Q
2	Cydonie Mothersill	Cayman Islands	11.58	Q
3	Lauren Hewitt	Australia	11.58	Q
4	Esther Möller	Germany	11.64	Q
5	Sonia Williams	Antigua and Barbuda	11.67	
6	Kim Gevaert	Belgium	11.74	
7	Joan Ekah	Nigeria	11.92	
8	Nadine Mahobah	France	11.99	

=== Quarterfinals ===
21 August

==== Quarterfinal 1 ====
Wind: -1.8 m/s

Rank	Name	Nationality	Time	Notes
1	Nora Ivanova	Bulgaria	11.53	Q
2	Cydonie Mothersill	Cayman Islands	11.76	Q
3	Sonia Williams	Antigua and Barbuda	11.84	Q
4	Nadine Mahobah	France	11.91	Q
5	Mindy Slomka	Australia	12.15	
6	Tina Matul	Slovenia	12.17	
7	Stefania Ferrante	Italy	12.22	
	Paola Restrepo	Colombia	DNS	

==== Quarterfinal 2 ====
Wind: -1.3 m/s

Rank	Name	Nationality	Time	Notes
1	Andrea Anderson	United States	11.60	Q
2	Johanna Manninen	Finland	11.79	Q
3	Kim Gevaert	Belgium	11.81	Q
4	Marion Wagner	Germany	11.92	Q
5	Gabriela Švecová	Czech Republic	12.03	
6	Isabel Roussow	South Africa	12.21	
7	Tamara Cherebin	Bahamas	12.23	
8	Rebecca Drummond	United Kingdom	12.24	

==== Quarterfinal 3 ====
Wind: -1.3 m/s

Rank	Name	Nationality	Time	Notes
1	Lakeesha White	United States	11.63	Q
2	Manuela Levorato	Italy	11.73	Q
3	Agnė Visockaitė	Lithuania	11.81	Q
4	Saran Patterson	Jamaica	11.82	Q
5	Vera Georgieva	Bulgaria	11.90	
6	Lantoniana Ramalalanirina	Madagascar	12.01	
7	Michelle Baptiste	Saint Lucia	12.08	
8	Gosha Rostek	United Kingdom	12.11	

==== Quarterfinal 4 ====
Wind: -1.1 m/s

Rank	Name	Nationality	Time	Notes
1	Lauren Hewitt	Australia	11.71	Q
2	Esther Möller	Germany	11.74	Q
3	Joan Ekah	Nigeria	11.95	Q
4	Doris Deruel	France	12.02	Q
5	Anna Voskanyan	Russia	12.20	
6	Kozue Motohashi	Japan	12.25	
7	Chen Shu-Chuan	Chinese Taipei	12.27	
8	Pavla Sichová	Czech Republic	12.30	

=== Heats ===
21 August

==== Heat 1 ====
Rank	Name	Nationality	Time	Notes
1	Lakeesha White	United States	11.51	Q
2	Agnė Visockaitė	Lithuania	11.71	Q
3	Stefania Ferrante	Italy	12.05	Q
4	Pavla Sichová	Czech Republic	12.06	Q
5	Nadia Riesen	Switzerland	12.25	
6	Margaret Fox	Canada	12.28	

==== Heat 2 ====
Wind: +0.9 m/s

Rank	Name	Nationality	Time	Notes
1	Nora Ivanova	Bulgaria	11.34	Q
2	Manuela Levorato	Italy	11.67	Q
3	Doris Deruel	France	11.67	Q
4	Rebecca Drummond	United Kingdom	11.88	Q
5	Mindy Slomka	Australia	11.93	q
6	Tamara Cherebin	Bahamas	12.04	q
7	Kozue Motohashi	Japan	12.07	q
8	Cristina Marani	San Marino	13.28	

==== Heat 3 ====
Rank	Name	Nationality	Time	Notes
1	Andrea Anderson	United States	11.64	Q
2	Johanna Manninen	Finland	11.79	Q
3	Vera Georgieva	Bulgaria	12.01	Q
4	Nadine Mahobah	France	12.10	Q
5	Gosha Rostek	United Kingdom	12.13	q
6	Irene Boldrim	Brazil	12.17	
7	Desiree Cooks	Anguilla	12.77	

==== Heat 4 ====
Wind: -0.6 m/s

Rank	Name	Nationality	Time	Notes
1	Lauren Hewitt	Australia	11.68	Q
2	Cydonie Mothersill	Cayman Islands	11.69	Q
3	Tina Matul	Slovenia	11.97	Q
4	Michelle Baptiste	Saint Lucia	12.08	Q
5	Chen Shu-Chuan	Chinese Taipei	12.11	q
6	Isabel Roussow	South Africa	12.12	q
7	Natasha Quan-Vie	Canada	12.27	
8	Chamanthi Maligaspe	Sri Lanka	13.07	

==== Heat 5 ====
Rank	Name	Nationality	Time	Notes
1	Marion Wagner	Germany	11.91	Q
2	Joan Ekah	Nigeria	11.93	Q
3	Lantoniana Ramalalanirina	Madagascar	11.93	Q
4	Gabriela Švecová	Czech Republic	12.07	Q
5	Irina Kartacheva	Ukraine	12.26	
6	Li Xuemei	China	12.43	
7	Clara Córdoba	Colombia	12.71	
8	Nurulaini Ariffin	Singapore	12.84	

==== Heat 6 ====
Rank	Name	Nationality	Time	Notes
1	Esther Möller	Germany	11.68	Q
2	Sonia Williams	Antigua and Barbuda	11.70	Q
3	Kim Gevaert	Belgium	11.71	Q
4	Anna Voskanyan	Russia	11.92	Q
5	Saran Patterson	Jamaica	11.99	q
6	Paola Restrepo	Colombia	12.13	q
7	Ayumi Shimazaki	Japan	12.18	
8	Ahlam Allali	Algeria	12.24	

== Participation ==
According to an unofficial count, 45 athletes from 34 countries participated in the event.

- Algeria (1)
- Anguilla (1)
- Antigua and Barbuda (1)
- Australia (2)
- Bahamas (1)
- Belgium (1)
- Brazil (1)
- Bulgaria (2)
- Canada (2)
- Cayman Islands (1)
- China (1)
- Chinese Taipei (1)
- Colombia (2)
- Czech Republic (2)
- Finland (1)
- France (2)
- Germany (2)
- Italy (2)
- Jamaica (1)
- Japan (2)
- Lithuania (1)
- Madagascar (1)
- Nigeria (1)
- Russia (1)
- Saint Lucia (1)
- San Marino (1)
- Singapore (1)
- Slovenia (1)
- South Africa (1)
- Sri Lanka (1)
- Switzerland (1)
- Ukraine (1)
- United Kingdom (2)
- United States (2)
