= 1996 World Junior Championships in Athletics – Women's heptathlon =

The women's heptathlon event at the 1996 World Junior Championships in Athletics was held in Sydney, Australia, at International Athletic Centre on 23 and 24 August.

== Medalists ==
Gold	Yelizaveta Shalygina; Russia
Silver	Johanna Halkoaho; Finland
Bronze	Hana Dolezelová; Czech Republic

== Results ==
=== Final ===
23/24 August

The highest mark recorded in each event is highlighted in yellow

Rank	Name	Nationality	100m H	HJ	SP	200m	LJ	JT	800m	Points	Notes
1st place, gold medalist(s)	Yelizaveta Shalygina	Russia	14.48 (w: -1.7 m/s)	1.81	12.74	25.25 (w: -0.1 m/s)	5.91	33.18	2:16.28	5711	
2nd place, silver medalist(s)	Johanna Halkoaho	Finland	14.01 (w: -1.7 m/s)	1.75	11.01	24.94 (w: -0.3 m/s)	6.23	38.30	2:27.90	5656	
3rd place, bronze medalist(s)	Hana Dolezelová	Czech Republic	14.74 (w: -1.7 m/s)	1.75	11.71	25.89 (w: -0.1 m/s)	5.77	43.36	2:25.46	5504	
4	Inga Leiwesmeier	Germany	14.54 (w: -1.7 m/s)	1.66	11.76	25.38 (w: -0.3 m/s)	5.69	41.82	2:19.81	5490	
5	Natalya Roshchupkina	Russia	15.01 (w: -1.7 m/s)	1.72	12.41	25.35 (w: -0.3 m/s)	5.64	36.32	2:18.20	5448	
6	Saskia Meijer	Netherlands	14.78 (w: -1.7 m/s)	1.72	12.32	26.49 (w: -0.1 m/s)	5.52	38.14	2:19.72	5352	
7	Sonja Kesselschläger	Germany	14.69 (w: -1.7 m/s)	1.66	11.94	26.16 (w: -0.1 m/s)	5.51	46.06	2:28.92	5322	
8	Katja Ripatti	Finland	15.65 (w: -1.7 m/s)	1.69	13.45	25.65 (w: -0.1 m/s)	5.49	45.46	2:33.11	5308	
9	Ottelien Olsthoorn	Netherlands	14.47 (w: -1.7 m/s)	1.69	10.42	24.77 (w: -0.3 m/s)	5.80	32.72	2:33.40	5188	
10	Nicola Gautier	United Kingdom	15.01 (w: -1.7 m/s)	1.66	12.89	25.43 (w: -0.3 m/s)	4.93	37.98	2:29.72	5079	
11	Alexandra Barlet	France	15.59 (w: -1.7 m/s)	1.66	12.03	26.90 (w: -0.3 m/s)	5.45	34.14	2:33.26	4848	
12	Maud Sillans	France	15.28 (w: -1.7 m/s)	1.57	9.12	25.88 (w: -0.1 m/s)	5.14	34.48	2:36.13	4564	
	Yuliya Akulenko	Ukraine	15.36 (w: -1.7 m/s)	1.75	NM	DNS	DNS	DNS	DNS	DNF	

== Participation ==
According to an unofficial count, 13 athletes from 8 countries participated in the event.

- Czech Republic (1)
- Finland (2)
- France (2)
- Germany (2)
- Netherlands (2)
- Russia (2)
- Ukraine (1)
- United Kingdom (1)
