= 1996 World Junior Championships in Athletics – Women's long jump =

The women's long jump event at the 1996 World Junior Championships in Athletics was held in Sydney, Australia, at International Athletic Centre on 22 and 23 August.

== Medalists ==
Gold	Guan Yingnan; China
Silver	Cristina Nicolau; Romania
Bronze	Johanna Halkoaho; Finland

== Results ==
=== Final ===
23 August

Rank	Name	Nationality	Attempts						Result	Notes
Rank	Name	Nationality	1	2	3	4	5	6	Result	Notes
1st place, gold medalist(s)	Guan Yingnan	China	6.16 (w: +0.8 m/s)	6.43 (w: +1.5 m/s)	6.53 (w: +0.6 m/s)	6.24 (w: +0.2 m/s)	6.44 (w: +0.4 m/s)	6.24 (w: +0.6 m/s)	6.53 (w: +0.6 m/s)	
2nd place, silver medalist(s)	Cristina Nicolau	Romania	6.39 (w: +0.3 m/s)	6.44 (w: +0.7 m/s)	6.23 (w: +0.7 m/s)	6.24 (w: +0.8 m/s)	6.41 (w: +0.7 m/s)	6.47 (w: +0.2 m/s)	6.47 (w: +0.2 m/s)	
3rd place, bronze medalist(s)	Johanna Halkoaho	Finland	x	6.38 (w: +0.5 m/s)	-	-	6.30 (w: +0.6 m/s)	x	6.38 (w: +0.5 m/s)	
4	Magdalena Khristova	Bulgaria	6.35 (w: +0.6 m/s)	5.68 (w: +0.7 m/s)	6.22 (w: +0.5 m/s)	6.01 (w: 0.0 m/s)	6.21 (w: +0.2 m/s)	6.21 (w: +1.0 m/s)	6.35 (w: +0.6 m/s)	
5	Yuliya Akulenko	Ukraine	x	6.15 (w: +0.8 m/s)	6.14 (w: +0.2 m/s)	6.26 (w: 0.0 m/s)	6.09 (w: +0.3 m/s)	6.31 w (w: +2.2 m/s)	6.31 w (w: +2.2 m/s)	
6	Tambi Jogis	Australia	6.02 (w: +0.8 m/s)	6.11 (w: +0.6 m/s)	6.18 (w: +0.5 m/s)	6.13 (w: +0.5 m/s)	x	6.07 (w: +0.8 m/s)	6.18 (w: +0.5 m/s)	
7	Olivia Wöckinger	Austria	5.90 (w: +0.1 m/s)	6.09 (w: +0.4 m/s)	6.04 (w: +0.2 m/s)	x	x	6.02 (w: +0.6 m/s)	6.09 (w: +0.4 m/s)	
8	Eva Dolezalová	Czech Republic	x	6.03 (w: +0.6 m/s)	5.99 (w: +0.5 m/s)	x	5.87 (w: +0.2 m/s)	x	6.03 (w: +0.6 m/s)	
9	Danielle Varsseveld	Netherlands	x	6.01 (w: +0.3 m/s)	5.90 (w: +0.6 m/s)				6.01 (w: +0.3 m/s)	
10	Reïna-Flor Okori	France	5.92 (w: +0.3 m/s)	5.98 (w: +0.5 m/s)	5.76 (w: +0.6 m/s)				5.98 (w: +0.5 m/s)	
11	Martina Žabková	Czech Republic	5.60 (w: -0.7 m/s)	5.78 (w: +0.3 m/s)	5.89 (w: +0.6 m/s)				5.89 (w: +0.6 m/s)	
12	Wang Kuo-huei	Chinese Taipei	5.83 (w: 0.0 m/s)	5.67 (w: +0.6 m/s)	5.74 (w: +0.2 m/s)				5.83 (w: 0.0 m/s)	

=== Qualifications ===
22 Aug

==== Group A ====
Rank	Name	Nationality	Attempts			Result	Notes
Rank	Name	Nationality	1	2	3	Result	Notes
1	Magdalena Khristova	Bulgaria	6.29 (w: +0.2 m/s)	-	-	6.29 (w: +0.2 m/s)	Q
2	Reïna-Flor Okori	France	x	6.28 (w: +0.3 m/s)	-	6.28 (w: +0.3 m/s)	Q
3	Wang Kuo-huei	Chinese Taipei	5.91 (w: +0.3 m/s)	6.01 (w: -0.2 m/s)	6.10 (w: -0.1 m/s)	6.10 (w: -0.1 m/s)	q
4	Eva Dolezalová	Czech Republic	6.05 (w: -0.4 m/s)	x	6.08 (w: -0.2 m/s)	6.08 (w: -0.2 m/s)	q
5	Sandra Stube	Germany	5.85 (w: -0.3 m/s)	5.89 (w: +0.4 m/s)	5.97 (w: +0.6 m/s)	5.97 (w: +0.6 m/s)	
6	Niina Saarman	Finland	x	5.84 (w: +0.1 m/s)	3.65 (w: -0.4 m/s)	5.84 (w: +0.1 m/s)	
7	Stephany Reid	Canada	5.03 (w: -0.1 m/s)	5.38 (w: +0.6 m/s)	5.77 (w: -0.2 m/s)	5.77 (w: -0.2 m/s)	
8	Sarah Claxton	United Kingdom	5.71 (w: +0.3 m/s)	5.65 (w: +0.3 m/s)	x	5.71 (w: +0.3 m/s)	
9	Agneta Rosenblad	Sweden	x	5.47 (w: +0.4 m/s)	x	5.47 (w: +0.4 m/s)	
10	Michelle Baptiste	Saint Lucia	5.34 (w: +0.4 m/s)	3.62 (w: +0.4 m/s)	5.18 (w: +0.1 m/s)	5.34 (w: +0.4 m/s)	
11	Francesca Green	United States	4.20 (w: +0.4 m/s)	5.33 (w: +0.1 m/s)	x	5.33 (w: +0.1 m/s)	
12	Zhong Mei	China	4.92 (w: 0.0 m/s)	4.75 (w: +0.2 m/s)	5.28 (w: +0.4 m/s)	5.28 (w: +0.4 m/s)	

==== Group B ====
Rank	Name	Nationality	Attempts			Result	Notes
Rank	Name	Nationality	1	2	3	Result	Notes
1	Cristina Nicolau	Romania	6.42 (w: +0.3 m/s)	-	-	6.42 (w: +0.3 m/s)	Q
2	Guan Yingnan	China	x	6.38 (w: +0.1 m/s)	-	6.38 (w: +0.1 m/s)	Q
3	Tambi Jogis	Australia	5.89 (w: -0.6 m/s)	5.90 (w: -0.1 m/s)	6.23 (w: -0.1 m/s)	6.23 (w: -0.1 m/s)	q
4	Yuliya Akulenko	Ukraine	6.18 (w: -0.2 m/s)	6.10 (w: -0.6 m/s)	x	6.18 (w: -0.2 m/s)	q
5	Olivia Wöckinger	Austria	x	6.12 (w: -0.4 m/s)	6.08 (w: -0.1 m/s)	6.12 (w: -0.4 m/s)	q
6	Johanna Halkoaho	Finland	6.12 (w: -0.5 m/s)	5.97 (w: -0.8 m/s)	x	6.12 (w: -0.5 m/s)	q
7	Danielle Varsseveld	Netherlands	5.90 (w: 0.0 m/s)	x	6.12 (w: -0.4 m/s)	6.12 (w: -0.4 m/s)	q
8	Martina Žabková	Czech Republic	5.45 (w: -0.7 m/s)	5.59 (w: -0.2 m/s)	6.01 (w: -0.9 m/s)	6.01 (w: -0.9 m/s)	q
9	Maryna Samborska	Ukraine	5.76 (w: -0.2 m/s)	5.85 (w: -0.9 m/s)	5.82 (w: -0.1 m/s)	5.85 (w: -0.9 m/s)	
10	Jernae Wright	United States	4.29 (w: -1.0 m/s)	5.30 (w: -1.1 m/s)	5.61 (w: -0.9 m/s)	5.61 (w: -0.9 m/s)	
11	Kim Eun-Young	South Korea	5.44 (w: -0.6 m/s)	5.60 (w: -0.7 m/s)	5.60 (w: -1.1 m/s)	5.60 (w: -0.7 m/s)	
12	Kéné Ndoye	Senegal	5.42 (w: -0.6 m/s)	5.19 (w: -0.1 m/s)	5.32 (w: 0.0 m/s)	5.42 (w: -0.6 m/s)	

== Participation ==
According to an unofficial count, 24 athletes from 19 countries participated in the event.

- Australia (1)
- Austria (1)
- Bulgaria (1)
- Canada (1)
- China (2)
- Chinese Taipei (1)
- Czech Republic (2)
- Finland (2)
- France (1)
- Germany (1)
- Netherlands (1)
- Romania (1)
- Saint Lucia (1)
- Senegal (1)
- South Korea (1)
- Sweden (1)
- Ukraine (2)
- United Kingdom (1)
- United States (2)
