= 2008 IAAF World Indoor Championships – Women's 60 metres =

== Medalists ==
Gold
Angela Williams	United States
Silver
Jeanette Kwakye	United Kingdom
Bronze
Tahesia Harrigan	British Virgin Islands

== Heats ==
Heat	Lane	Name	Country	Mark	Q
1	4	Kim Gevaert	Belgium	7.31	Q
1	6	Laura Turner	United Kingdom	7.34	Q
1	2	Svetlana Nabokina	Russia	7.38	Q
1	5	Inna Eftimova	Bulgaria	7.50	Q
1	7	Ruddy Zang Milama	Gabon	7.66	
1	3	Fabienne Weyermann	Switzerland	7.67	
1	8	Maki Samantha Lockington	Cook Islands	8.69 PB	
2	4	Ene Franca Idoko	Nigeria	7.19	Q
2	5	LaVerne Jones-Ferrette	United States Virgin Islands	7.23 SB	Q
2	2	Virgen Benavides	Cuba	7.29	Q
2	3	Ailis McSweeney	Ireland	7.43	Q
2	6	Lina Grincikaité	Lithuania	7.45	q
2	7	Affoué Amandine Allou	Ivory Coast	7.57 SB	
2	8	Martina Pretelli	San Marino	8.54	
3	7	Guzel Khubbieva	Uzbekistan	7.24 SB	Q
3	6	Yevgeniya Polyakova	Russia	7.25	Q
3	4	Verena Sailer	Germany	7.37	Q
3	5	Bettina Müller-Weissina	Austria	7.37	Q
3	8	Alexis Joyce	United States	7.50	q
3	3	Nina Kovacic	Slovenia	7.57	q
3	2	Valentina Nazarova	Turkmenistan	7.72 NR	
4	2	Tahesia Harrigan	British Virgin Islands	7.21	Q
4	5	Jeanette Kwakye	United Kingdom	7.33	Q
4	7	Ivet Lalova	Bulgaria	7.36	Q
4	8	Lena Berntsson	Sweden	7.45	Q
4	6	Feta Ahamada	Comoros	7.71	
4	1	Rosa Mystique Jone	Nauru	8.09 PB	
4	4	Hawwa Haneefa	Maldives	8.42 PB	
4	3	Nongnuch Sanrat	Thailand	DNS	
5	3	Angela Williams	United States	7.29	Q
5	4	Oludamola Osayomi	Nigeria	7.35	Q
5	5	Delphine Atangana	Cameroon	7.37	Q
5	7	Vida Anim	Ghana	7.37	Q
5	8	Ezinne Okparaebo	Norway	7.42	q
5	2	Lucimar Aparecida de Moura	Brazil	7.64	
5	6	Amando Choo	Singapore	7.74 NR	

== Semifinals ==
Heat	Lane	Name	Country	Mark	Q
1	5	Ene Franca Idoko	Nigeria	7.10	Q
1	4	Yevgeniya Polyakova	Russia	7.20	Q
1	3	LaVerne Jones-Ferrette	United States Virgin Islands	7.24	
1	1	Lena Berntsson	Sweden	7.26 PB	
1	2	Verena Sailer	Germany	7.28	
1	6	Ivet Lalova	Bulgaria	7.31 SB	
1	7	Ailis McSweeney	Ireland	7.46	
1	8	Nina Kovacic	Slovenia	7.47	
2	6	Tahesia Harrigan	British Virgin Islands	7.12 NR	Q
2	4	Jeanette Kwakye	United Kingdom	7.13 NR	Q
2	3	Kim Gevaert	Belgium	7.18	q
2	8	Alexis Joyce	United States	7.22	q
2	5	Virgen Benavides	Cuba	7.25	
2	2	Inna Eftimova	Bulgaria	7.33	
2	7	Delphine Atangana	Cameroon	7.37	
2	1	Vida Anim	Ghana	7.45	
3	5	Angela Williams	United States	7.12	Q
3	4	Oludamola Osayomi	Nigeria	7.21	Q
3	3	Guzel Khubbieva	Uzbekistan	7.27	
3	6	Laura Turner	United Kingdom	7.28 SB	
3	7	Svetlana Nabokina	Russia	7.28	
3	1	Ezinne Okparaebo	Norway	7.34 SB	
3	8	Bettina Müller-Weissina	Austria	7.35 SB	
3	2	Lina Grincikaité	Lithuania	7.41	

== Final ==
Heat	Lane	Name	Country	Mark	React
Gold medal	6	Angela Williams	United States	7.06 WL	0.142
Silver medal	5	Jeanette Kwakye	United Kingdom	7.08 NR	0.163
Bronze medal	3	Tahesia Harrigan	British Virgin Islands	7.09 NR	0.149
4	1	Kim Gevaert	Belgium	7.22	0.149
5	7	Yevgeniya Polyakova	Russia	7.24	0.156
6	8	Oludamola Osayomi	Nigeria	7.26	0.169
7	4	Ene Franca Idoko	Nigeria	7.30	0.132
8	2	Alexis Joyce	United States	7.37	0.229
