= 1996 World Junior Championships in Athletics – Women's 400 metres hurdles =

The women's 400 metres hurdles event at the 1996 World Junior Championships in Athletics was held in Sydney, Australia, at International Athletic Centre on 22 and 23 August.

== Medalists ==
Gold	Ulrike Urbansky; Germany
Silver	Vicki Jamison; United Kingdom
Bronze	Tanya Jarrett; Jamaica

== Results ==
=== Final ===
23 August

Rank	Name	Nationality	Time	Notes
1st place, gold medalist(s)	Ulrike Urbansky	Germany	56.65	
2nd place, silver medalist(s)	Vicki Jamison	United Kingdom	57.57	
3rd place, bronze medalist(s)	Tanya Jarrett	Jamaica	57.91	
4	Josephine Fowley	Australia	58.52	
5	Svetlana Badrankova	Kazakhstan	58.53	
6	Annika Kumlin	Finland	58.80	
7	Medina Tudor	Romania	58.90	
8	Yasnay Lescay	Cuba	59.40	

=== Heats ===
22 August

==== Heat 1 ====
Rank	Name	Nationality	Time	Notes
1	Josephine Fowley	Australia	58.36	Q
2	Annika Kumlin	Finland	58.45	Q
3	Svetlana Badrankova	Kazakhstan	58.48	q
4	Chou Ya-Chun	Chinese Taipei	62.28	
5	Yuko Iida	Japan	63.56	
	Astrid Joziasse	Netherlands	DNF	
	Yuliya Nosova	Russia	DNF	

==== Heat 2 ====
Rank	Name	Nationality	Time	Notes
1	Ulrike Urbansky	Germany	56.96	Q
2	Vicki Jamison	United Kingdom	57.49	Q
3	Tanya Jarrett	Jamaica	58.40	q
4	Deniece Bell	Canada	59.20	
5	Char Foster	United States	59.50	
6	Florence Delaune	France	60.35	
7	Jennifer Marshall	Australia	60.57	

==== Heat 3 ====
Rank	Name	Nationality	Time	Notes
1	Yasnay Lescay	Cuba	59.01	Q
2	Medina Tudor	Romania	59.03	Q
3	Wu Wei	China	60.08	
4	Elizabeth Ndubueze	Nigeria	60.82	
5	Ana Costa	Portugal	62.00	
6	Anika Ahrens	Germany	62.48	
7	Shontel Powell	United States	62.56	

== Participation ==
According to an unofficial count, 21 athletes from 18 countries participated in the event.

- Australia (2)
- Canada (1)
- China (1)
- Chinese Taipei (1)
- Cuba (1)
- Finland (1)
- France (1)
- Germany (2)
- Jamaica (1)
- Japan (1)
- Kazakhstan (1)
- Netherlands (1)
- Nigeria (1)
- Portugal (1)
- Romania (1)
- Russia (1)
- United Kingdom (1)
- United States (2)
