= Jessica Rodríguez (disambiguation) =

Jessica Rodríguez (born 1982) is a pageant titleholder.

Jessica Rodríguez may also refer to

- Jessica Rodríguez (hurdler) (born 1975), Spanish hurdler in 1997 European Athletics U23 Championships – Women's 100 metres hurdles
- Jessica Rodríguez (runner) (born 1976), Mexican marathon runner in Athletics at the 2007 Pan American Games – Women's marathon
- Jessica Feshbach Rodriguez, Scientology spokesperson
