= Magdalena Khristova =

Bulgarian athlete (born 1977)

Magdalena Khristova (born 25 February 1977) is a Bulgarian athlete. She formerly specialized in the long jump, but turned to the 100 metres since 2002.

She had a personal best jump of 6.94 metres, achieved in June 1996 in Kalamata. Over 100 m her personal best time is 11.39 seconds, achieved in July 2005 in Sofia.

== Achievements ==
Year	Competition	Venue	Position	Event	Notes
Representing Bulgaria
1994	World Junior Championships	Lisbon, Portugal	4th	Long jump	6.39 m w (wind: +3.5 m/s)
1994	World Junior Championships	Lisbon, Portugal	4th	4 × 100 m relay	45.22
1996	World Junior Championships	Sydney, Australia	4th	Long jump	6.35 m (wind: +0.6 m/s)
1997	World Championships	Athens, Greece	9th	Long jump	6.64 m
1998	European Indoor Championships	Valencia, Spain	4th	Long jump	6.60 m
1999	World Indoor Championships	Maebashi, Japan	7th	Long jump	6.55 m
1999	European U23 Championships	Gothenburg, Sweden	7th	Long jump	6.25 m (wind: 1.2 m/s)
2007	European Indoor Championships	Birmingham, England	8th	60 m	7.33 s
