= Manuela Levorato =

Italian sprinter

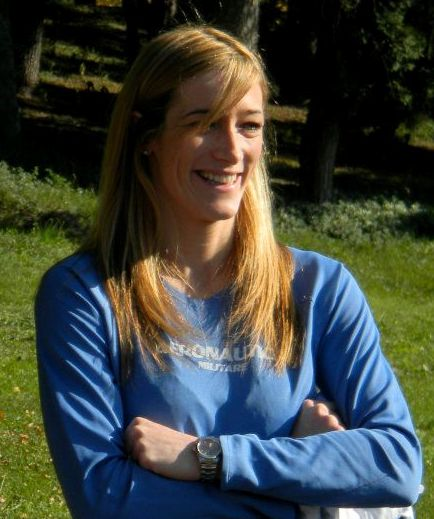
- Manuela Levorato in 2011

Personal information
- Nationality: Italian
- Born: 16 March 1977 (age 49) Dolo, Italy
- Height: 1.80 m (5 ft 11 in)
- Weight: 66 kg (146 lb)

Sport
- Country: Italy
- Sport: Athletics
- Event: Sprint
- Club: C.S. Aeronautica Militare

Achievements and titles
- Personal bests: 100 m: 11.14 (2001); 200 m: 22.60 (1999); 400 m: 52.16 (2002)
Medal record
European Championships
Bronze medal – third place	2002 Munich	100 metres
Bronze medal – third place	2002 Munich	200 metres
Mediterranean Games
Silver medal – second place	2001 Tunis	100 metres
Bronze medal – third place	1997 Bari	4x100 metres relay
European U23 Championships
Gold medal – first place	1999 Gothenburg	100 metres
Gold medal – first place	1999 Gothenburg	200 metres
Bronze medal – third place	1997 Turku	4x100 metres relay
European U23 Championships
Silver medal – second place	1995 Nyíregyháza	4x100 metres relay

Manuela Levorato (born 16 March 1977, in Dolo) is an Italian sprinter, who specializes in the 100 and 200 metres.

She won eight medals at the International athletics championships and games.

== Biography ==
At the 2002 European Championships Levorato won a bronze medal in these two events. She also competed at the World Championships in 1999, 2001 and 2005.

Her personal best times are 11.14 s (100 m, 2001) and 22.60 s (200 m, 1999).

After 2015 she was Vice Presidend and now is Honorary President of Atletica Riviera del Brenta her first team in 1994.

In 2021 she was Vice President of F.I.D.A.L. of Veneto.

In 2022 she published the book La corsa, le mie ali.

In 2024 she became Vice Presidend of F.I.D.A.L.

== Achievements ==
Year	Competition	Venue	Position	Event	Notes
Representing Italy
1996	World Junior Championships	Sydney, Australia	7th	100m	11.54
1996	World Junior Championships	Sydney, Australia	2nd (h)	200m	24.10 (wind: 0.0 m/s)
1996	World Junior Championships	Sydney, Australia	5th	4 × 100 m relay	45.27
1997	European U23 Championships	Turku, Finland	4th	100m	11.56 (wind: +1.6 m/s)
1997	European U23 Championships	Turku, Finland	3rd	4 × 100 m relay	44.73
1999	European U23 Championships	Gothenburg, Sweden	1st	100m	11.26 (wind: -0.2 m/s)
1999	European U23 Championships	Gothenburg, Sweden	1st	200m	22.68 (wind: -0.5 m/s)
2002	European Championships	Munich, Germany	3rd	100 metres	11.23
2002	European Championships	Munich, Germany	3rd	200 metres	22.75

== National titles ==
Manuela Levorato has won 15 times the individual national championship.

- 4 wins in 100 metres (1999, 2001, 2002, 2010)
- 1 wins in 200 metres (2001)
- 7 wins in 60 metres indoor (1998, 1999, 2000, 2002, 2003, 2004, 2011)
- 3 wins in 200 metres indoor (2002, 2003, 2004)

== See also ==
- Italian all-time lists - 100 metres
- Italian all-time lists - 200 metres
- Italian all-time lists - 400 metres
- Italian all-time lists - 4x100 metres relay
- Italy national relay team

== Bibliography ==
- Levorato, Manuela; et al. (2023). La Corsa, le mie Ali (in Italian). Independently published. ISBN 9798374779455.
