= 1999 European Athletics U23 Championships – Women's 200 metres =

The women's 200 metres event at the 1999 European Athletics U23 Championships was held in Gothenburg, Sweden, at Ullevi on 30 and 31 July 1999.

== Medalists ==
Gold	Manuela Levorato; Italy
Silver	Muriel Hurtis; France
Bronze	Sabrina Mulrain; Germany

== Results ==
=== Final ===
31 July
Wind: -0.5 m/s

Rank	Name	Nationality	Time	Notes
1st place, gold medalist(s)	Manuela Levorato	Italy	22.68	
2nd place, silver medalist(s)	Muriel Hurtis	France	22.85	
3rd place, bronze medalist(s)	Sabrina Mulrain	Germany	22.85	
4	Esther Möller	Germany	23.06	
5	Kim Gevaert	Belgium	23.08	
6	Fabé Dia	France	23.20	
7	Olena Pastushenko	Ukraine	23.23	
8	Vukosava Đapić	Yugoslavia	23.84	

=== Heats ===
30 July
Qualified: first 2 in each heat and 2 best to the Final

==== Heat 1 ====
Wind: 0.1 m/s

Rank	Name	Nationality	Time	Notes
1	Manuela Levorato	Italy	22.94	Q
2	Fabé Dia	France	23.14	Q
3	Vukosava Đapić	Yugoslavia	23.62	q
4	Susan Williams	United Kingdom	23.81	
5	Yekaterina Stankevich	Belarus	24.22	
6	Kinga Wéber	Hungary	24.70	

==== Heat 2 ====
Wind: 0.1 m/s

Rank	Name	Nationality	Time	Notes
1	Sabrina Mulrain	Germany	23.16	Q
2	Kim Gevaert	Belgium	23.26	Q
3	Agnė Visockaitė	Lithuania	23.82	
4	Naja Dancy	France	23.88	
5	Biljana Mitrović	Yugoslavia	24.04	
6	Elena Córcoles	Spain	24.41	
7	Jelena Savilova	Latvia	24.56	

==== Heat 3 ====
Wind: 0.9 m/s

Rank	Name	Nationality	Time	Notes
1	Muriel Hurtis	France	22.81	Q
2	Esther Möller	Germany	23.04	Q
3	Olena Pastushenko	Ukraine	23.06	q
4	Marina Kislova	Russia	23.73	
5	Melanie Purkiss	United Kingdom	23.89	
6	Renáta Balazsic	Hungary	23.92	

== Participation ==
According to an unofficial count, 19 athletes from 13 countries participated in the event.

- Belarus (1)
- Belgium (1)
- France (3)
- Germany (2)
- Hungary (2)
- Italy (1)
- Latvia (1)
- Lithuania (1)
- Russia (1)
- Spain (1)
- Ukraine (1)
- United Kingdom (2)
- Yugoslavia (2)
