= 2002 European Athletics Indoor Championships – Women's 60 metres =

The women's 60 metres event at the 2002 European Athletics Indoor Championships was held on March 2–3.

== Medalists ==
Gold	Silver	Bronze
Kim Gevaert; Belgium	Marina Kislova; Russia	Georgia Kokloni; Greece

== Results ==
=== Heats ===
First 3 of each heat (Q) and the next 4 fastest (q) qualified for the semifinals.

Rank	Heat	Name	Nationality	Time	Notes
1	2	Kim Gevaert	Belgium	7.16	Q, NR
2	2	Georgia Kokloni	Greece	7.17	Q
3	1	Karin Mayr	Austria	7.24	Q
3	4	Marina Kislova	Russia	7.24	Q
5	1	Odiah Sidibe	France	7.26	Q
6	4	Andrea Philipp	Germany	7.27	Q
7	2	Marion Wagner	Germany	7.28	Q, SB
8	2	Larisa Kruglova	Russia	7.29	q
8	3	Joice Maduaka	Great Britain	7.29	Q
10	1	Aleksandra Prokofvjev	Slovenia	7.30	Q
11	1	Severina Cravid	Portugal	7.34	q
12	3	Katleen De Caluwé	Belgium	7.35	Q
12	4	Sandra Citte	France	7.35	Q
14	3	Yuliya Tabakova	Russia	7.36	Q
14	4	Martina Feusi	Switzerland	7.36	q
14	4	Yuliya Bartsevich	Belarus	7.36	q
17	2	Katrin Käärt	Estonia	7.39	
18	4	Voula Patoulidou	Greece	7.48	
19	3	Aksel Gürcan	Turkey	7.49	
20	2	Bettina Müller	Austria	7.52	
21	4	Mirjam Liimask	Estonia	7.53	
22	3	Enikő Szabó	Hungary	7.54	
23	1	Gianoula Kafetzi	Greece	7.61	
24	2	Radmila Vukmirović	Slovenia	7.63	
25	3	Deirdre Farrugia	Malta	8.04	NR
26	3	Sara Maroncelli	San Marino	8.10	PB
	1	Aleksandra Vojnevska	Macedonia	DNS	

=== Semifinals ===
First 4 of each semifinals qualified directly (Q) for the final.

Rank	Heat	Name	Nationality	Time	Notes
1	1	Kim Gevaert	Belgium	7.17	Q
2	2	Marina Kislova	Russia	7.20	Q
3	2	Karin Mayr	Austria	7.22	Q
4	1	Marion Wagner	Germany	7.24	Q
5	1	Georgia Kokloni	Greece	7.25	Q
5	1	Larisa Kruglova	Russia	7.25	Q
5	2	Andrea Philipp	Germany	7.25	Q
8	1	Joice Maduaka	Great Britain	7.27	PB
9	1	Odiah Sidibe	France	7.28	
10	2	Aleksandra Prokofjev	Slovenia	7.29	Q
11	1	Yuliya Tabakova	Russia	7.30	
12	2	Katleen De Caluwé	Belgium	7.34	
13	2	Sandra Citte	France	7.35	
14	2	Severina Cravid	Portugal	7.38	
15	2	Yuliya Bartsevich	Belarus	7.38	
16	1	Martina Feusi	Switzerland	7.42	

=== Final ===
Rank	Lane	Name	Nationality	Time	Notes
1st place, gold medalist(s)	6	Kim Gevaert	Belgium	7.16	=NR
2nd place, silver medalist(s)	3	Marina Kislova	Russia	7.18	SB
3rd place, bronze medalist(s)	7	Georgia Kokloni	Greece	7.22	
4	5	Karin Mayr	Austria	7.22	
5	4	Marion Wagner	Germany	7.23	SB
6	8	Larisa Kruglova	Russia	7.25	
7	2	Andrea Philipp	Germany	7.27	
8	1	Aleksandra Prokofjev	Slovenia	7.37	
