= Agnė Eggerth =

Lithuanian sprinter (born 1978)

Personal information
- Born: 4 August 1978 (age 48) Kaunas, Soviet Union

Sport
- Sport: Track and field

Agnė Visockaitė-Eggerth (born 4 August 1978) is a track and field sprint athlete who competes internationally for Lithuania.

== Achievements ==
Year	Competition	Venue	Position	Event	Notes
Representing Lithuania
1994	Lithuanian Championships	Lithuania	1st	200 m	23.8
1994	World Junior Championships	Lisbon, Portugal	18th (qf)	200m	24.45 (wind: -0.4 m/s)
1995	Lithuanian Championships	Lithuania	1st	100 m	11.78
1996	Lithuanian Championships	Lithuania	1st	100 m	11.74
1996	Lithuanian Championships	Lithuania	1st	200 m	23.64
1996	World Junior Championships	Sydney, Australia	12th (sf)	100m	11.78
1996	World Junior Championships	Sydney, Australia	4th	200m	23.75 (wind: -2.2 m/s)
1997	Lithuanian Championships	Lithuania	1st	100 m	11.79
1997	European Junior Championships	Ljubljana, Slovenia	2nd	100 m	11.42
1998	Lithuanian Championships	Lithuania	1st	100 m	11.61
1998	Lithuanian Championships	Lithuania	1st	200 m	24.05
1998	Lithuanian Championships	Lithuania	1st	4 × 100 m	
1998	European Championships	Budapest, Hungary	24th	100 m	11.74
1999	European U23 Championships	Gothenburg, Sweden	13th (h)	100m	11.68 (wind: 0.4 m/s)
1999	European U23 Championships	Gothenburg, Sweden	11th (h)	200m	23.82 (wind: 0.1 m/s)
2000	Olympic Games	Sydney, Australia	56th	100 m	11.87
2002	Lithuanian Championships	Lithuania	1st	100 m	11.48
2002	European Championships	Munich, Germany	9th	100 m	11.44
2003	Lithuanian Championships	Lithuania	1st	100 m	11.37
2003	World Championships	Paris, France	19th	100 m	11.36
2004	Lithuanian Championships	Lithuania	1st	100 m	11.41
2004	Lithuanian Championships	Lithuania	1st	200 m	23.39
2004	Olympic Games	Athens, Greece	32nd	100 m	11.44

== Personal bests ==
- Indoor
  - 50 m: 6.31 (NR)
  - 55 m: 6.75 (NR)
  - 60 m: 7.23 (NR)
  - 200 m: 23.22 (NR)
- Outdoor
  - 100 m: 11.29
  - 200 m: 23.22 (NR)

== See also ==
- Lithuania at the Olympics
