= 1999 European Athletics U23 Championships – Women's long jump =

The women's long jump event at the 1999 European Athletics U23 Championships was held in Gothenburg, Sweden, at Ullevi on 29 and 30 July 1999.

== Medalists ==
Gold	Aurélie Félix; France
Silver	Inga Leiwesmeier; Germany
Bronze	Eva Miklos; Romania

== Results ==
=== Final ===
30 July

Rank	Name	Nationality	Attempts						Result	Notes
Rank	Name	Nationality	1	2	3	4	5	6	Result	Notes
1st place, gold medalist(s)	Aurélie Félix	France	x	6.34 (w: 0.3 m/s)	6.85 (w: 1.2 m/s)	6.50 (w: 0.7 m/s)	6.63 (w: 1.8 m/s)	x	6.85 (w: 1.2 m/s)	CR
2nd place, silver medalist(s)	Inga Leiwesmeier	Germany	x	6.63 (w: 0.7 m/s)	6.64 (w: 1.4 m/s)	x	–	–	6.64 (w: 1.4 m/s)	
3rd place, bronze medalist(s)	Eva Miklos	Romania	x	6.51 (w: 0.6 m/s)	6.20 (w: 1.2 m/s)	6.26 (w: 0.7 m/s)	x	–	6.51 (w: 0.6 m/s)	
4	Cristina Nicolau	Romania	6.35 (w: 1.6 m/s)	6.50 (w: 0.8 m/s)	x	6.40 (w: 0.7 m/s)	x	4.91 (w: 0.8 m/s)	6.50 (w: 0.8 m/s)	
5	Laura Gatto	Italy	6.40 (w: 1.6 m/s)	6.18 (w: 0.5 m/s)	6.33 (w: -0.9 m/s)	6.37 (w: 0.8 m/s)	6.21 (w: 1.8 m/s)	6.15 (w: 0.8 m/s)	6.40 (w: 0.7 m/s)	
6	Sarah Gautreau	France	x	6.28 (w: 1.7 m/s)	x	x	6.04 (w: 0.1 m/s)	x	6.28 (w: 1.7 m/s)	
7	Magdalena Khristova	Bulgaria	x	6.07 (w: 0.4 m/s)	6.25 (w: 1.2 m/s)	x	6.16 (w: 1.0 m/s)	x	6.25 (w: 1.2 m/s)	
8	Yuliya Akulenko	Ukraine	6.23 (w: 0.2 m/s)	x	5.96 (w: -0.1 m/s)	6.06 (w: 0.8 m/s)	6.09 (w: 0.6 m/s)	–	6.23 (w: 0.2 m/s)	
9	Lucie Komrsková	Czech Republic	x	x	5.06 (w: 0.6 m/s)				6.06 (w: 0.6 m/s)	
10	Sarah Claxton	Great Britain	x	6.02 (w: 0.9 m/s)	x				6.02 (w: 0.9 m/s)	
11	Vanessa Peñalver	Spain	5.72 (w: 0.7 m/s)	5.88 (w: 0.1 m/s)	x				5.86 (w: 0.1 m/s)	
12	Edita Sibiga	Poland	x	5.61 (w: 0.5 m/s)	x				5.61 (w: 0.5 m/s)	

=== Qualifications ===
29 July
First 12 to the Final

Rank	Name	Nationality	Result	Notes
1	Aurélie Félix	France	6.65 (w: 0.7 m/s)	Q
2	Cristina Nicolau	Romania	6.57 w (w: 2.4 m/s)	Q
3	Inga Leiwesmeier	Germany	6.56 (w: 0.6 m/s)	Q
4	Sarah Claxton	Great Britain	6.35 (w: 1.4 m/s)	Q
5	Eva Miklos	Romania	6.23 (w: 1.2 m/s)	Q
6	Yuliya Akulenko	Ukraine	6.16 (w: 1.0 m/s)	Q
7	Sarah Gautreau	France	6.15 (w: 0.3 m/s)	Q
8	Lucie Komrsková	Czech Republic	6.15 (w: 1.2 m/s)	Q
9	Laura Gatto	Italy	6.10 (w: 1.1 m/s)	Q
10	Vanessa Peñalver	Spain	6.09 (w: 1.8 m/s)	Q
11	Edita Sibiga	Poland	6.06 (w: -0.9 m/s)	Q
12	Magdalena Khristova	Bulgaria	6.06 (w: 1.8 m/s)	Q
13	Irene Charalambous	Cyprus	5.88 (w: 0.9 m/s)	
14	Natalya Budarina	Russia	5.61 (w: 0.9 m/s)	
	Bianca Kappler	Germany	NM	
	Johanna Halkoaho	Finland	NM	

== Participation ==
According to an unofficial count, 16 athletes from 13 countries participated in the event.

- Bulgaria (1)
- Cyprus (1)
- Czech Republic (1)
- Finland (1)
- France (2)
- Germany (2)
- Great Britain (1)
- Italy (1)
- Poland (1)
- Romania (2)
- Russia (1)
- Spain (1)
- Ukraine (1)
