= 1999 European Athletics U23 Championships – Women's 100 metres =

The women's 100 metres event at the 1999 European Athletics U23 Championships was held in Gothenburg, Sweden, at Ullevi on 29 and 30 July 1999.

== Medalists ==
Gold	Manuela Levorato; Italy
Silver	Olena Pastushenko; Ukraine
Bronze	Kim Gevaert; Belgium

== Results ==
=== Final ===
30 July
Wind: -0.2 m/s

Rank	Name	Nationality	Time	Notes
1st place, gold medalist(s)	Manuela Levorato	Italy	11.26	
2nd place, silver medalist(s)	Olena Pastushenko	Ukraine	11.33	
3rd place, bronze medalist(s)	Kim Gevaert	Belgium	11.39	
4	Marion Wagner	Germany	11.48	
5	Doris Deruel	France	11.49	
6	Nadine Mahobah	France	11.55	
7	Irena Sznajder	Poland	11.61	
8	Marina Kislova	Russia	11.65	

=== Heats ===
29 July
Qualified: first 2 in each heat and 2 best to the Final

==== Heat 1 ====
Wind: -0.5 m/s

Rank	Name	Nationality	Time	Notes
1	Doris Deruel	France	11.47	Q
2	Irena Sznajder	Poland	11.58	Q
3	Yekaterina Stankevich	Belarus	11.86	
4	Manuela Grillo	Italy	11.89	
5	Yuliya Lobisheva	Russia	11.96	
6	Abiodun Oyepitan	Great Britain	25.00	

==== Heat 2 ====
Wind: 0.9 m/s

Rank	Name	Nationality	Time	Notes
1	Manuela Levorato	Italy	11.20	Q, CR
2	Olena Pastushenko	Ukraine	11.24	Q
3	Marion Wagner	Germany	11.38	q
4	Nadine Mahobah	France	11.49	q
5	Annika Amundin	Sweden	11.59	
6	Agnieszka Rysiukiewicz	Poland	11.64	

==== Heat 3 ====
Wind: 0.4 m/s

Rank	Name	Nationality	Time	Notes
1	Kim Gevaert	Belgium	11.40	Q
2	Marina Kislova	Russia	11.54	Q
3	Vukosava Đapić	Yugoslavia	11.57	
4	Alice Reuss	Germany	11.63	
5	Agnė Visockaitė	Lithuania	11.68	
6	Laura Seston	Great Britain	11.73	

== Participation ==
According to an unofficial count, 18 athletes from 12 countries participated in the event.

- Belarus (1)
- Belgium (1)
- France (2)
- Germany (2)
- Great Britain (2)
- Italy (2)
- Lithuania (1)
- Poland (2)
- Russia (2)
- Sweden (1)
- Ukraine (1)
- Yugoslavia (1)
