= Halimat Ismaila =

Nigerian sprinter

Personal information
- Full name: Halimat Oyinoza Ismaila
- Nationality: Nigerian
- Born: July 3, 1984 (age 42) Ilorin, Kwara State, Nigeria

Sport
- Sport: Athletics
- Events: 100 metres, 4 × 100 metres relay
- College team: UTEP Miners

Achievements and titles
- Olympic finals: 2008 Summer Olympics

Halimat Oyinoza Ismaila (born 3 July 1984 in Ilorin, Kwara) is a Nigerian track and field athlete who won a bronze medal in 4 × 100 metres relay at the 2008 Summer Olympics.

Ismalia was an All-American sprinter for the UTEP Miners track and field team, finishing 6th in the 4 × 100 m at the 2008 NCAA Division I Outdoor Track and Field Championships.

Ismaila represented Nigeria at the 2008 Summer Olympics in Beijing competing at the 100 metres sprint. In her first round heat she placed fourth in a time of 11.72 which was not enough to advance to the second round. Together with Ene Franca Idoko, Gloria Kemasuode, Agnes Osazuwa and Oludamola Osayomi she also took part in the 4 × 100 metres relay. In their first round heat (without Ismaila) they placed fourth behind Belgium, Great Britain and Brazil. Their time of 43.43 seconds was the best non-directly qualifying time and the sixth time overall out of sixteen participating nations. With this result they qualified for the final in which they replaced Osazuwa with Ismaila. They sprinted to a time of 43.04 seconds, a third place and a bronze medal after Russia and Belgium. In 2016, the Russian team was disqualified and stripped of their gold medal due to doping violations by one of the Russian runners, Yuliya Chermoshanskaya, thereby promoting Nigeria to the silver medal position.

== Achievements ==
Year	Competition	Venue	Position	Event	Notes
Representing Nigeria
2008	Olympic Games	Beijing, PR China	2nd	4 × 100 m relay	43.04 s
