= Kim Gevaert =

Belgian sprinter

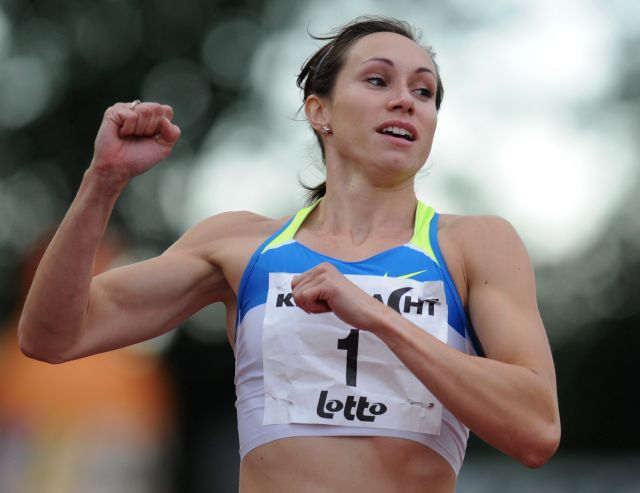
- Gevaert in 2008

Personal information
- Born: 5 August 1978 (age 48) Leuven, Belgium
- Height: 170 cm (5 ft 7 in)
- Weight: 60 kg (132 lb)
- Spouse: Djeke Mambo

Sport
- Club: V. A. C. Steenokkerzeel; CA Valencia Terra i Mar
- Coached by: Rudi Diels
- Retired: 2008

Achievements and titles
- Olympic finals: 2004, 2008
- Personal bests: 100 m – 11.04 (2006); 200 m – 22.20 (2006)
Medal record
Representing Belgium
Event	1st	2nd	3rd
Olympic Games	1	0	0
World Championships	0	0	1
World Indoor Championships	0	1	1
European Championships	2	2	0
European Indoor Championships	3	0	0
Continental Cup	0	1	0
Universiade	1	1	0
Total	7	5	2
Olympic Games
Gold medal – first place	2008 Beijing	4 × 100 m relay
World Championships
Bronze medal – third place	2007 Osaka	4 × 100 m relay
World Indoor Championships
Silver medal – second place	2004 Budapest	60 m
Bronze medal – third place	2006 Moscow	60 m
European Championships
Gold medal – first place	2006 Gothenburg	100 m
Gold medal – first place	2006 Gothenburg	200 m
Silver medal – second place	2002 Munich	100 m
Silver medal – second place	2002 Munich	200 m
European Indoor Championships
Gold medal – first place	2002 Vienna	60 m
Gold medal – first place	2005 Madrid	60 m
Gold medal – first place	2007 Birmingham	60 m
Summer Universiade
Gold medal – first place	1999 Mallorca	200 m
Silver medal – second place	2001 Beijing	200 m
Continental Cup
Silver medal – second place	2006 Athens	200 m

Kim Gevaert (born 5 August 1978 in Leuven) is a former sprinter and Olympic champion from Belgium.

== Career ==
Her closest brush with a world title came in running four hundredths of a second behind three-time champion Gail Devers at the 2004 IAAF World Indoor Championships in Athletics. At the next World Indoor Championships, in 2006, she won the bronze medal in a national record time of 7.11 seconds.

On 9 August 2006 Gevaert won the 100 metres at the European Championships in 11.06 seconds. Two days later, she also won the final of the 200 metres, which was celebrated together with fellow Belgian athlete Tia Hellebaut, who had won gold in the high jump final only minutes before Kim Gevaert. With her first medal, Gevaert became the first Belgian gold medalist at the European Championships in 35 years and the first woman to win the sprint double since 1994.

At the 2007 World Championships she won a bronze medal in the 4 × 100 metres relay, together with teammates Hanna Mariën, Olivia Borlée and Élodie Ouédraogo. With 42.75 seconds the team set a new Belgian record. A few days earlier as best European athlete she had finished 5th in a thrilling 100 m final.

On her 30th birthday, three days before the opening of the 2008 Summer Olympics in Beijing, Gevaert announced that she would retire at the end of the 2008 season.

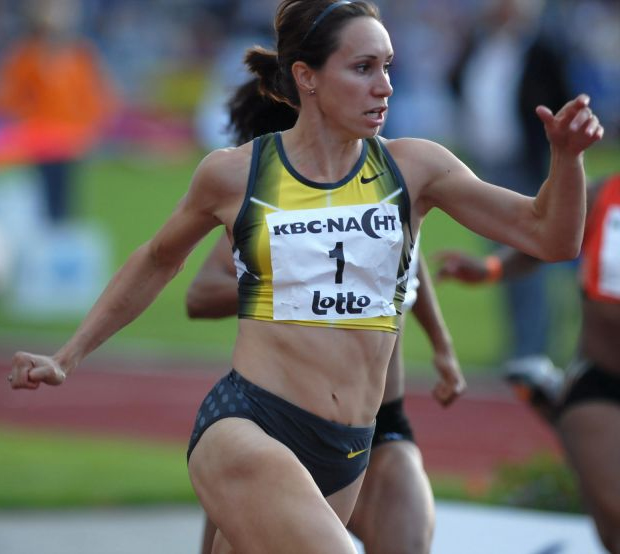
Kim Gevaert during the 2008 Night of Athletics

At the 2008 Summer Olympics, Gevaert was in the best condition of her life. She reached the 100 m semifinals by ending 3rd in her quarterfinals, but after missing her start she finished sixth and failed to proceed to the finals. In the finals of the 4 × 100 m for women a couple of days later, Gevaert ran the final leg for the Belgian team and finished in second behind the Russians to bring home the silver medal in a new Belgian record of 42.54 seconds. On 16 August 2016, it was announced that the IOC had officially disqualified the Russian 4 × 100 metres relay team after Yuliya Chermoshanskaya's re-tested samples revealed two illegal substances, awarding the gold medal to the Belgian team. She was awarded the gold medal eight years late on 10 September 2016.

On 5 September 2008, Kim Gevaert ended her career running the 100 m at the Memorial Van Damme in Brussels, Belgium, a race which she won in 11.25.

== Personal life ==
Gevaert has two brothers, Marlon and John, and a sister Sigrid. Marlon competed in sprint at the national level in Belgium before becoming a national sprint coach in New Zealand. In 2010 Gevaert married her long-time partner and a fellow athlete Djeke Mambo. They have two sons and one daughter, who are bilingual, as the principal language of their father is French and of their mother is Flemish.

== Honours and awards ==
- Golden Spike - Best female athlete: 2001, 2002, 2003, 2004, 2005, 2007
- Vlaamse Reus: 2002, 2004, 2007, nominations in 2006, 2008
- Flemish Sportsjewel: 2002
- Honorary Citizen of Kampenhout: 2002
- Belgian Sports Personality of the Year: 2004
- Belgian Sports team of the Year: Women's 4 × 100 metres relay: 2004, 2007, 2008
- Golden Medal of Honor of the Flemish Parliament: 2005
- Belgian National Sports Merit Award: 2006 (with Tia Hellebaut)
- Flemish Sportsjewel: 2007 (Women's 4 × 100 metres relay team)
- Belgian Olympic and Interfederal Committee Order of Merit: 2021
- Belgian National Sports Merit Award: 2007 (Women's 4 × 100 metres relay team)
- Honorary Citizen of Steenokkerzeel: 2006
- Dame Grand Cross of the Order of the Crown, by Royal Decree of H.M. King Albert II: 2009
- Honorary Citizen of Sint-Genesius-Rode: 2017

In 2026, the Chemin Kim Gevaert/Kim Gevaertweg in the Heysel neighbourhood of Brussels, Belgium, was named in her honour.

== Major achievements ==
Year	Competition	Venue	Position	Event	Notes
Representing Belgium
1996	World Junior Championships	Sydney, Australia	100 m	10th (sf)	11.74
1996	World Junior Championships	Sydney, Australia	200 m	7th	23.88 (wind: -2.2 m/s)
1999	European U23 Championships	Gothenburg, Sweden	100 m	3rd	11.39 (wind: -0.2 m/s)
1999	European U23 Championships	Gothenburg, Sweden	200 m	5th	23.08 (wind: -0.5 m/s)
2002	European Indoor Championship	Vienna, Austria	60 m	1st	7.16
2002	European Championships	Munich, Germany	100 m	2nd	11.22
2002	European Championships	Munich, Germany	200 m	2nd	22.53
2003	1st IAAF World Athletics Final	Monte Carlo, Monaco	200 m	4th	22.95
2004	World Indoor Championships	Budapest, Hungary	60 m	2nd	7.12 NR
2004	Olympic Games	Athens, Greece	200 m	6th	22.84
2005	European Indoor Championships	Madrid, Spain	60 m	1st	7.16
2006	World Indoor Championships	Moscow, Russia	60 m	3rd	7.11 NR
2006	European Championships	Gothenburg, Sweden	100 m	1st	11.06 (First Belgian woman to win a gold medal in this event.)
2006	European Championships	Gothenburg, Sweden	200 m	1st	22.68
2007	European Indoor Championship	Birmingham, England	60 m	1st	7.12 (7.10 in the semi-final NR)
2007	World Championships	Osaka, Japan	100 m	5th	11.05 (First European woman)
2007	World Championships	Osaka, Japan	4 × 100 m	3rd	42.75 NR
2008	Olympic Games	Beijing Olympic Stadium, Beijing, China	4 × 100 m	1st	42.54 NR
2008	Memorial Van Damme	Brussels, Belgium	100 m	1st	11.25 (last event before her retirement)

== Personal best ==
- 60 metres: 7.10 seconds (Belgian Record)
- 100 metres: 11.04 seconds (Wind: 2.0/Place: Brussels/Date:09 07 2006) (Belgian Record)
- 200 metres: 22.20 seconds (Brussels/09 07 2006) (Belgian Record)
- 400 metres: 51.45 seconds (-/Gent/08 05 2005) (Belgian Record)

Awards
Preceded by Kim Clijsters	Belgian Sports Personality of the Year; 2004	Succeeded by Tom Boonen
