= Taking Up Space =

2019 non-fiction book by Chelsea Kwakye and Ore Ogunbiyi

Taking Up Space: The Black Girl's Manifesto for Change
- Author: Chelsea Kwakye and Ore Ogunbiyi
- Language: English
- Publisher: Merky Books
- Publication date: 27 June 2019
- Publication place: United Kingdom

Taking Up Space: The Black Girl's Manifesto for Change is a 2019 book by Cambridge University graduates Chelsea Kwakye, who is British-Ghanaian, and Ore Ogunbiyi, who is Nigerian-British.

It discusses the lack of diversity in higher education, and addresses topics such as decolonising the curriculum, access, mental health, relationships and activism. The book includes interviews with students from UK universities about their experiences. Kwakye holds a degree in history and Ogunbiyi in human, social and political sciences. Taking Up Space was the first independent book to be published by #Merky Books, an imprint with the publishing house Penguin Random House in collaboration with grime artist Stormzy, who has a scholarship programme that funds black British students to go to Cambridge University.

In 2020, Sid Gentle Films acquired the television rights to the book.
