= Ulrike Urbansky =

German hurdler

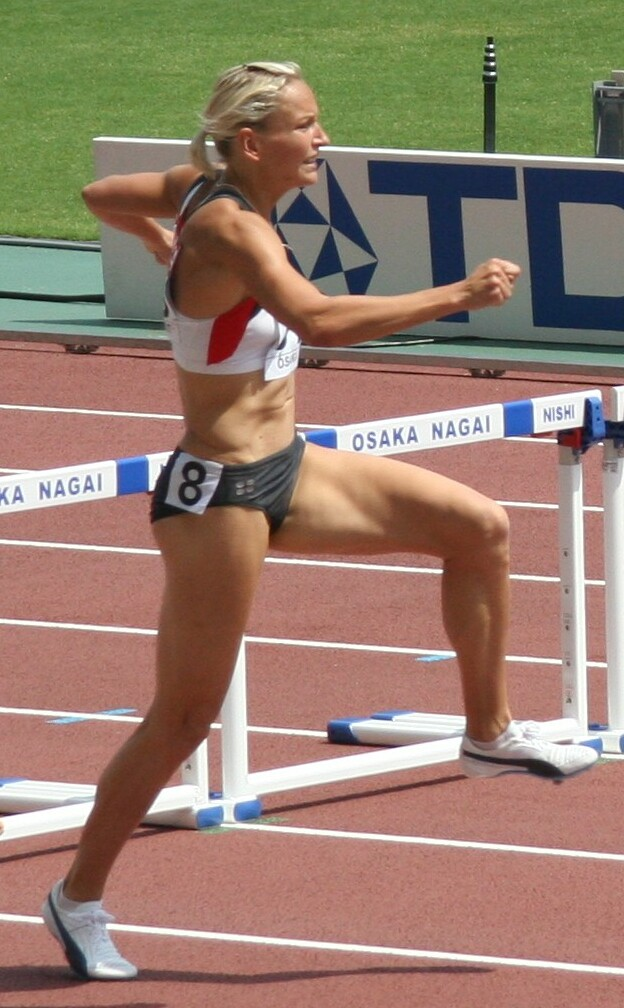
- Urbansky in Osaka, 2007

Personal information
- Born: 6 April 1977 (age 49) Jena, West Germany

Sport
- Sport: Track and field
Medal record
Representing Germany
European U23 Championships
Silver medal – second place	1999 Gothenburg	400m hurdles
Silver medal – second place	1999 Gothenburg	4x400m relay
Summer Universiade
Bronze medal – third place	1999 Palma de Mallorca	400m hurdles
World Junior Championships
Gold medal – first place	1996 Sydney	400m hurdles
Gold medal – first place	1996 Sydney	4x400m relay
Bronze medal – third place	1994 Lisbon	4x400m relay
European Junior Championships
Silver medal – second place	1995 Nyiregyhaza	400m hurdles

Ulrike Leyckes (née Urbansky, born 6 April 1977) is a German former athlete who specialized in the 400 metres hurdles. She competed in the Olympic Games in Sydney in 2000 and Athens in 2004, each time reaching the semi-final. Her personal best time is 54.57 seconds, achieved in July 2000 in Barcelona. She retired from competitive sport in 2009.

She married decathlete Dennis Leyckes in September 2008.

== Achievements ==
Year	Competition	Venue	Position	Event	Notes
Representing Germany
1994	World Junior Championships	Lisbon, Portugal	3rd	4 × 400 m relay	3:36.65
1995	European Junior Championships	Nyíregyháza, Hungary	2nd	400 m hurdles	57.21
1996	World Junior Championships	Sydney, Australia	1st	400m hurdles	56.65
1996	World Junior Championships	Sydney, Australia	1st	4 × 400 m relay	3:31.12
1998	European Championships	Budapest, Hungary	6th	400 m hurdles	55.38
1998	World Cup	Johannesburg, South Africa	1st	4 × 400 m relay	3:24.26
1999	World Indoor Championships	Maebashi, Japan	4th	4 × 400 m relay	3:29.06
1999	Universiade	Palma, Spain	3rd	400 m hurdles	54.93
1999	European U23 Championships	Gothenburg, Sweden	2nd	400m hurdles	56.08
1999	European U23 Championships	Gothenburg, Sweden	2nd	4 × 400 m relay	3:29.37
2005	World Championships	Helsinki, Finland	6th	4 × 400 m relay	3:28.39
