= Yevgeniya Polyakova =

Russian sprinter (born 1983)

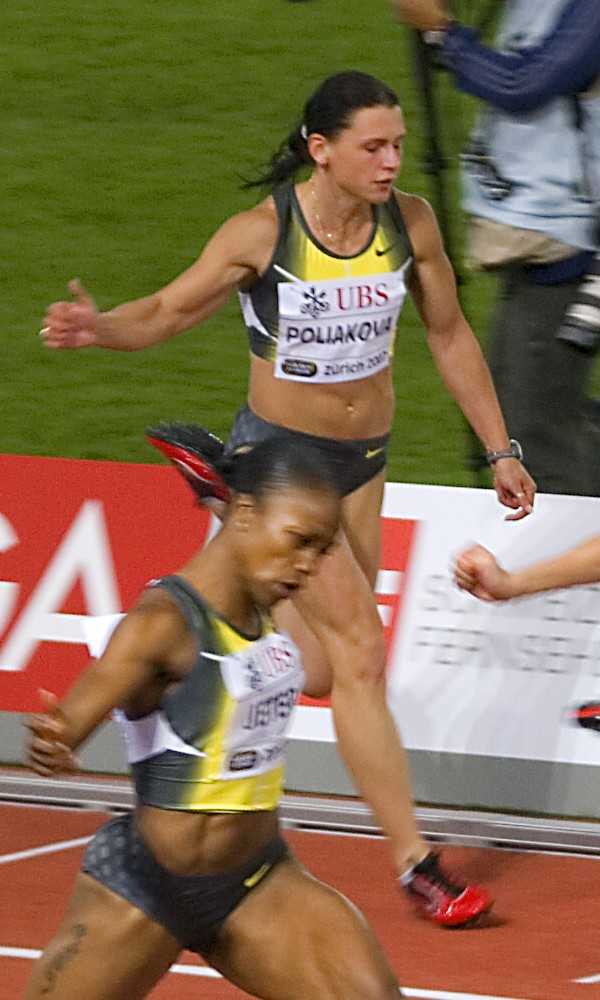

Medal record

Women's athletics

Representing Russia

Olympic Games
Disqualified	2008 Beijing	4 × 100 relay

European Indoor Championships
Gold medal – first place	2009 Torino	60 m
Silver medal – second place	2007 Birmingham	60 m

Yevgeniya Andreyevna Polyakova (Russian: Евгения Андреевна Полякова; born 29 May 1983 in Moscow) is a Russian sprinter who specializes in the 100 metres race.

Polyakova represented Russia at the 2008 Summer Olympics in Beijing competing at the 100 metres sprint. In her first round heat she placed first in front of Jade Bailey and Sherone Simpson in a time of 11.24 to advance to the second round. There she improved her time to 11.13 seconds, finishing second behind Shelly-Ann Fraser to qualify for the semi-finals. With a time of 11.38 she was unable to qualify for the final as her time was only the seventh time of her heat, causing elimination. Together with Aleksandra Fedoriva, Yulia Gushchina and Yuliya Chermoshanskaya she also took part in the 4 × 100 metres relay. In their first round heat they placed second behind Jamaica, but in front of Germany and China. Their time of 42.87 seconds was also the second time overall out of sixteen participating nations. With this result they qualified for the final in which they sprinted to 42.31 seconds, the first place and the gold medal. The Jamaican team did not finish due to a mistake in the baton exchange.

In August 2016, she and her three Russian teammates were stripped of their Olympic gold medal due to a doping violation by Chermoshanskaya.

== International competitions ==
Year	Competition	Venue	Position	Event	Notes
Representing Russia
2005	European U23 Championships	Erfurt, Germany	—	4 × 100 m relay	DNF
2007	European Indoor Championships	Birmingham, United Kingdom	2nd	60 m	7.18
2008	World Indoor Championships	Valencia, Spain	5th	60 m	7.24

== Personal bests ==
- 60 metres – 7.09 s (2008, indoor)
- 100 metres – 11.09 s (2007)
