= Nora Ivanova =

Austrian sprinter (born 1977)

Nora Ivanova Нора Иванова
Personal information
- Nationality: Austria Turkey Bulgaria
- Born: 1 June 1977 (age 49) Bulgaria
- Height: 175 cm (5 ft 9 in)
- Weight: 58 kg (128 lb) (2001)

Sport
- Sport: Sprint
- Club: LCC Wien, Fenerbahçe Athletics
- Coached by: Konstantin Milanov

Achievements and titles
- Personal bests: 100 m: 11.23 (1998); 200 m: 22.71 NR (2002); 300 m: 36.87 NR (2002)
Medal record
Women's athletics
Representing Turkey
Mediterranean Games
Gold medal – first place	2001 Tunis	100 m
Gold medal – first place	2001 Tunis	200 m
Balkan Games
Gold medal – first place	2000 Kavala	200 m
Representing Bulgaria
World Junior Championships
Gold medal – first place	1996 Sydney	100 m
Bronze medal – third place	1996 Sydney	200 m
European Junior Championships
Gold medal – first place	1995 Nyíregyháza	200 m
Silver medal – second place	1995 Nyíregyháza	100 m
European U23 Championships
Gold medal – first place	1997 Turku	100 m

Nora Ivanova (Bulgarian: Нора Иванова, born 1 June 1977), aka Nora Ivanova-Güner and later Nora Ivanova-Edletzberger, is a female sprinter of Bulgarian origin, who competed for Turkey before she obtained Austrian citizenship.

== Running for Bulgaria ==
Nora Ivanova won the silver medal in 100 m and the gold medal in 200 m at the 1995 European Athletics Junior Championships held in Nyíregyháza, Hungary. She was the gold medalist in the 100 m event and the bronze medalist in the 200 m event at the 1996 World Junior Championships held in Sydney, Australia. In 1997, she won the gold medal in 100 m at the European Athletics U23 Championships in Turku, Finland.

Ivanova became in 1996 national champion in 100 m with 11.46, and in 1997 in indoor 60 m with 7.35.

== Turkish citizen ==
During the 1997 World Championships in Athletics in Athens, Greece, she met Turkish high jumper Kemal Güner of Fenerbahçe Athletics. The couple married in 1999. She became a Turkish citizen and converted to Islam adopting the Turkish name Nur Güner. However, she became known further as Nora Güner. The 175 cm (5 ft 9 in) tall athlete at 58 kg (128 lb) competed for Fenerbahçe Athletics.

Nora Ivanova-Güner won the gold medal for Turkey in women's 200 m with 23.13 at the 55th Balkan Games held in Kavala, Greece. The next year, she earned two gold medals, one in 100 m and the other in 200 m at the 2001 Mediterranean Games held in Tunis, Tunisia.

As she had to care for her sick father Vladimir, she lived most of the time in Sofia apart from her husband. Kemal applied and obtained a residence permission to live in Bulgaria. In 2002, she decided to divorce and return to Bulgaria forever due to financial problems arisen through lack of sponsorships. After living with her husband in Sofia for a while, the couple divorced. She, however, continued to compete for Turkey.

She is the Turkey's national record holder in 100 m with 11.25 (2001) and 200 m with 22.71 (2002).

== Austrian citizen ==
Nora Ivanova obtained the Austrian citizenship in June 2006 adopting the family name Edletzberger. She became Austrian champion in 100 m and 200 m in 2007. She is a member of the club LCC Wien, where she is coached by Konstantin Milanov.

== Achievements ==
=== 100 m ===
Year	Competition	Venue	Position	Notes
Representing Bulgaria
1995	European Junior Championships	Nyíregyháza, Hungary	2nd	11.58
1996	World Junior Championships	Sydney, Australia	1st	11.32
1997	European U23 Championships	Turku, Finland	1st	11.50 (wind: 1.6 m/s)
Representing Turkey
2001	14th Mediterranean Games	Tunis, Tunisia	1st	11.25 NR
Representing Austria
2007	Austrian National Championships	Feldkirch-Gisingen, Austria	1st	11.87

=== 200 m ===
Year	Competition	Venue	Position	Notes
Representing Bulgaria
1994	World Junior Championships	Lisbon, Portugal	8th (h)	24.14 (wind: +1.0 m/s)
1995	European Junior Championships	Nyíregyháza, Hungary	1st	23.44
1996	World Junior Championships	Sydney, Australia	3rd	23.59 (wind: -2.2 m/s)
Representing Turkey
2000	55th Balkan Games	Kavala, Greece	1st	23.13
2001	14th Mediterranean Games	Tunis, Tunisia	1st	22.86
2002	European Indoor Championships	Vienna, Austria	4th	23.08
Representing Austria
2007	Austrian National Championships	Feldkirch-Gisingen, Austria	1st	23.51

=== 4×100m relay ===
Year	Competition	Venue	Position	Notes
Representing Bulgaria
1994	World Junior Championships	Lisbon, Portugal	4th	45.22
