= Athletics at the 2008 Summer Olympics – Women's 4 × 100 metres relay =

Women's 4 × 100 metres relay at the Games of the XXIX Olympiad
- Venue: Beijing National Stadium
- Dates: 21 August 2008 (heats); 22 August 2008 (final)
- Teams: 16
- Winning time: 42.54

Medalists
1st place, gold medalist(s)		Olivia Borlée; Kim Gevaert; Hanna Mariën; Élodie Ouédraogo	Belgium
2nd place, silver medalist(s)		Franca Idoko; Halimat Ismaila; Gloria Kemasuode; Oludamola Osayomi; Agnes Osazuwa*	Nigeria
3rd place, bronze medalist(s)		Rosemar Coelho Neto; Lucimar de Moura; Thaissa Presti; Rosângela Santos	Brazil

Official Video YouTube

The women's 4 × 100 metres relay event at the 2008 Olympic Games took place on 21 and 22 August at the Beijing Olympic Stadium.

There were 16 NOCs competing at this event, selected by the average of the two best marks in the qualifying period. Finland and Cuba qualified but withdrew, and were replaced by Thailand and Nigeria.

Originally, the Russian team won the gold medal but was disqualified in 2016 after Yuliya Chermoshanskaya had her blood and urine samples re-analyzed, and tested positive for two prohibited substances. One of her teammates, Yulia Guschina, was also later sanctioned for doping.

== Records ==
Prior to this competition, the existing world and Olympic records were as follows:

World record	East Germany (GDR) (Silke Gladisch, Sabine Rieger, Ingrid Auerswald, Marlies Göhr)	41.37	Canberra, Australia	6 October 1985
Olympic record	East Germany (Romy Müller, Bärbel Wöckel, Ingrid Auerswald, Marlies Göhr)	41.60	Moscow, Soviet Union	1 August 1980

No new world or Olympic records were set for this event.

== Qualification summary ==
Pos	NOC	2 races		1	2
Pos	NOC	Total	Average	1	2
1	United States	84.22	42.11	41.98	42.24
2	Jamaica	84.71	42.36	42.01	42.70
3	Russia	85.58	42.79	42.78	42.80
4	Belgium	85.60	42.80	42.75	42.85
5	Great Britain	85.69	42.85	42.82	42.87
6	Germany	86.25	43.13	43.08	43.17
7	Ukraine	86.43	43.22	43.03	43.40
8	Belarus	86.46	43.23	43.16	43.30
9	Italy	86.48	43.24	43.04	43.44
10	France	86.58	43.29	43.09	43.49
11	China	86.65	43.33	43.26	43.39
12	Poland	86.78	43.39	43.25	43.53
—	Finland	86.89	43.45	43.41	43.48
13	Brazil	86.90	43.45	43.36	43.54
14	Trinidad and Tobago	87.19	43.60	43.43	43.76
—	Cuba	87.26	43.63	43.46	43.80
15	Thailand	87.30	43.65	43.38	43.92
16	Nigeria	87.37	43.69	43.58	43.79
Reserves
17	Australia	87.53	43.77	43.62	43.91
18	Japan	87.60	43.80	43.67	43.93
18	Ghana	87.60	43.80	43.76	43.84

== Results ==
All times shown are in seconds:

- Q denotes automatic qualification
- q denotes fastest losers
- DNS denotes did not start
- DNF denotes did not finish
- DSQ denotes disqualified
- AR denotes area record
- NR denotes national record
- PB denotes personal best
- SB denotes season's best

=== Round 1 ===
First 3 in each heat(Q) and the next 2 fastest(q) advance to the Final.

Heat	Lane	Nation	Competitors	Results	Notes
2	7	Jamaica	Shelly-Ann Fraser, Sheri-Ann Brooks, Aleen Bailey, Veronica Campbell-Brown	42.24	Q, SB
2	3	Russia	Evgeniya Polyakova, Aleksandra Fedoriva, Yulia Gushchina, Yuliya Chermoshanskaya	42.87	DSQ (~~Q~~)
1	7	Belgium	Olivia Borlée, Hanna Mariën, Élodie Ouédraogo, Kim Gevaert	42.92	Q, SB
1	9	Great Britain	Jeanette Kwakye, Montell Douglas, Emily Freeman, Emma Ania	43.02	Q
1	5	Brazil	Rosemar Coelho Neto, Lucimar de Moura, Thaissa Presti, Rosângela Santos	43.38	Q
1	8	Nigeria	Franca Idoko, Gloria Kemasuode, Agnes Osazuwa, Oludamola Osayomi	43.43	q, SB
1	6	Poland	Ewelina Klocek, Daria Korczyńska, Dorota Jędrusińska, Marta Jeschke	43.47	q
2	4	Germany	Anne Möllinger, Verena Sailer, Cathleen Tschirch, Marion Wagner	43.59	Q
1	3	Belarus	Yuliya Nestsiarenka, Aksana Drahun, Nastassia Shuliak, Anna Bagdanovich	43.69	SB
2	5	China	Tao Yujia, Wang Jing, Jiang Lan, Qin Wangping	43.78	
2	9	Thailand	Sangwan Jaksunin, Orranut Klomdee, Jutamass Thavoncharoen, Nongnuch Sanrat	44.38	
2	2	France	Myriam Soumare, Muriel Hurtis-Houairi, Lina Jacques-Sebastien, Carima Louami	DNF	
1	4	Italy	Anita Pistone, Vincenza Calì, Giulia Arcioni, Audrey Alloh	DSQ	
2	6	Trinidad and Tobago	Wanda Hutson, Kelly-Ann Baptiste, Ayanna Hutchinson, Semoy Hackett	DNF	
2	8	Ukraine	Nataliya Pyhyda, Nataliya Pohrebnyak, Iryna Shepetyuk, Oksana Shcherbak	DSQ	
1	2	United States	Angela Williams, Mechelle Lewis, Torri Edwards, Lauryn Williams	DSQ	

=== Final ===
Rank	Lane	Nation	Competitors	Results	Notes
1st place, gold medalist(s)	5	Belgium	Olivia Borlée, Hanna Mariën, Élodie Ouédraogo, Kim Gevaert	42.54	NR
2nd place, silver medalist(s)	3	Nigeria	Franca Idoko, Gloria Kemasuode, Halimat Ismaila, Oludamola Osayomi	43.04	SB
3rd place, bronze medalist(s)	8	Brazil	Rosemar Coelho Neto, Lucimar de Moura, Thaissa Presti, Rosângela Santos	43.14	SB
4	9	Germany	Anne Möllinger, Verena Sailer, Cathleen Tschirch, Marion Wagner	43.28	
DNF	7	Great Britain	Jeanette Kwakye, Montell Douglas, Emily Freeman, Emma Ania	DNF	
DNF	6	Jamaica	Shelly-Ann Fraser, Sherone Simpson, Kerron Stewart, Veronica Campbell-Brown	DNF	
DSQ	2	Poland	Ewelina Klocek, Daria Korczyńska, Dorota Jędrusińska, Joanna Kocielnik	DSQ	
DSQ (1st)	4	Russia	Evgeniya Polyakova, Aleksandra Fedoriva, Yulia Gushchina, Yuliya Chermoshanskaya	DSQ (42.31)	Doping case
