= 1995 European Athletics Junior Championships =

- Level: Under 20
- Events: 41

The 1995 European Athletics Junior Championships was held in Nyíregyháza, Hungary on July 27–30.

== Men's results ==
Event	Gold		Silver		Bronze	
100 m	Dwain Chambers; Great Britain	10.41	Jamie Henthorn; Great Britain	10.41	Angelos Pavlakakis; Greece	10.47
200 m	Marlon Devonish; Great Britain	21.04	Alessio Comparini; Italy	21.21	Dan Money; Great Britain	21.29
400 m	Mark Hylton; Great Britain	45.97	Jacek Bocian; Poland	46.59	Tsvetomir Marinov; Bulgaria	46.66
800 m	Roberto Parra; Spain	1:45.90	André Bucher; Switzerland	1:46.73	Wojciech Kałdowski; Poland	1:47.67
1500 m	Reyes Estevez; Spain	3:45.74	José Redolat; Spain	3:46.70	Gert-Jan Liefers; Netherlands	3:47.17
5000 m	Benoit Zwierzchlewski; France	13:55.75	Juan José Gómez; Spain	14:15.65	Ivan Perez; Spain	14:17.83
10,000 m	Benoit Zwierzchlewski; France	29:46.42	Ivan Perez; Spain	30:06.69	Damiano Polti; Italy	30:06.91
3000 m steeplechase	Antonio Alvarez; Spain	8:50.75	Christian Knoblich; Germany	8:50.85	Jerome Cochet; France	8:52.92
110 m hurdles	Sven Pieters; Belgium	14.06	Robert Kronberg; Sweden	14.16	Tomasz Ścigaczewski; Poland	14.18
400 m hurdles	Daniel Hechler; Germany	50.42	Marcel Schelbert; Switzerland	50.44	Matthew Douglas; Great Britain	51.73
4 × 100 metres relay	Great Britain; Dwain Chambers; Marlon Devonish; Jamie Henthorn; Dan Money	39.43	Italy; Aldo Alaimo; Giulio Ibba; Michele Paggi; Alessio Comparini	39.61 (NJR)	Germany; Alexander Kosenkow; Eduard Martin; Anthony Viel; Thorsten Schulz	40.29
4 × 400 metres relay	Great Britain; Geoff Dearman; Steven McHardy; Tom Lerwill; Mark Hylton	3:07.09	France; Philippe Bouche; Ruddy Zami; Jean-Jacques Letzelter-Ebe; Robert Loubli; Loïc Lerouge	3:07.72	Poland; Jacek Bocian; Piotr Haczek; Jacek Lewandowski; Marcin Trelka	3:09.65
10,000 m walk	Andreas Erm; Germany	40:51.38	Paquillo Fernández; Spain	41:02.34	David Abellan; Spain	41:57.84
High jump	Oskari Frösén; Finland	2.19 m	Martin Buß; Germany	2.19 m	James Brierley; Great Britain	2.17 m
Pole vault	Yevgeniy Smiryagin; Russia	5.50 m	Timo Makkonen; Finland	5.45 m	Nicolas Jolivet; France	5.40 m
Long jump	Roman Shchurenko; Ukraine	7.78 m	Andrey Kislykh; Russia	7.76 m	Dmitriy Mishka; Ukraine	7.74 m
Triple jump	Ronald Servius; France	16.71 m	Dmitriy Vassilyev; Belarus	16.14 m	Paweł Zdrajkowski; Poland	15.96 m
Shot put	Tepa Reinikainen; Finland	17.20 m	René Sack; Germany	16.89 m	Iker Sukia; Spain	16.74 m
Discus throw	Andrzej Krawczyk; Poland	58.22 m	Mike Van Der Bilt; Netherlands	55.40 m	Tolga Koseoglu; Germany	52.06 m
Hammer throw	Szymon Ziółkowski; Poland	75.42 m	Nikolay Avlasevich; Belarus	68.80 m	Vassiliy Shevchenko; Ukraine	68.64 m
Javelin throw	Christian Nicolay; Germany	76.88 m	Harri Haatainen; Finland	74.28 m	Daniel Gustafsson; Sweden	72.38 m
Decathlon	Glenn Lindqvist; Finland	7363 pts	Rick Wassenaar; Netherlands	7299 pts	Jiří Ryba; Czech Republic	7271 pts

== Women's results ==
Event	Gold		Silver		Bronze	
100 m	Frédérique Bangué; France	11.48	Nora Ivanova; Bulgaria	11.58	Vyara Georgieva; Bulgaria	11.59
200 m	Nora Ivanova; Bulgaria	23.44	Fabé Dia; France	23.68	Sylviane Félix; France	23.81
400 m	Olga Kotlyarova; Russia	52.03	Andrea Burlacu; Romania	53.53	Jitka Burianová; Czech Republic	53.69
800 m	Mioara Cosulianu; Romania	2:04.15	Plamena Aleksandrova; Bulgaria	2:04.50	Anca Safta; Romania	2:04.55
1500 m	Lidia Chojecka; Poland	4:17.29	Lavinia Miroiu; Romania	4:19.11	Jolanda Steblovnik; Slovenia	4:20.22
3000 m	Denisa Costescu; Romania	9:13.44	Anita Weyermann; Switzerland	9:15.45	Olivera Jevtic; Yugoslavia	9:15.61
10,000 m	Nadia Singeorzan; Romania	33:24.94	Olivera Jevtić; Yugoslavia	33:48.61	Sadica Mihalache; Romania	34:10.22
100 m hurdles	Yelena Ovcharova; Ukraine	13.09	Natasha Danvers; Great Britain	13.46	Linda Ferga; France	13.61
400 m hurdles	Ionela Tîrlea; Romania	56.04	Ulrike Urbansky; Germany	57.21	Rikke Ronholt; Denmark	57.71
4 × 100 metres relay	Germany; Caroline Elmers; Esther Möller; Carmen Bertmaring; Marion Wagner	44.77	Italy; Elena Sordelli; Manuela Grillo; Fabiana Cosolo; Manuela Levorato	45.37	Poland; Magdalena Kamińska; Justyna Dybowska; Anna Głowacka; Aurelia Trywiańska	45.56
4 × 400 metres relay	France; Sandrine Thiébaud; Cindy Ega; Pierre-Marie Marival; Sylviane Félix	3:32.79	Russia; Marina Kozlova; Irina Mistyukevich; Natalya Misyakova; Olga Kotlyarova	3:36.10	Great Britain; Liz Williams; Joanne Sloane; Allison Curbishley; Louretta Thorne	3:38.23
5000 m walk	Sofia Avoila; Portugal	22:13.23	Olga Panfyorova; Russia	22:24.95	Jana Weidemann; Germany	22:30.90
High jump	Viktoriya Styopina; Ukraine	1.91 m	Kajsa Bergqvist; Sweden Yuliya Lyakhova; Russia	1.89 m		
Long jump	Linda Ferga; France	6.56 m	Cristina Nicolau; Romania	6.35 m	Iliana Ilieva; Bulgaria	6.25 m
Triple jump	Teresa Marinova; Bulgaria	13.90 m	Tatyana Lebedeva; Russia	13.88 m	Melinda Marton; Romania	13.71 m
Shot put	Corrie De Bruin; Netherlands	17.76 m	Yanina Korolchik; Belarus	16.95 m	Olga Ryabinkina; Russia	16.55 m
Discus throw	Corrie De Bruin; Netherlands	57.46 m	Olga Tsander; Belarus	54.66 m	Lieja Koeman; Netherlands	53.24 m
Javelin throw	Taina Uppa; Finland	60.72 m	Miréla Manjani; Albania	59.36 m	Angeliki Tsiolakoudi; Greece	54.76 m
Heptathlon	Annu Montell; Finland	5546 pts	Yelizaveta Shalygina; Russia	5476 pts	Katja Ripatti; Finland	5394 pts

== Medal table ==
Rank	Nation	Gold	Silver	Bronze	Total
1	France (FRA)	6	2	4	12
2	Great Britain (GBR)	5	2	4	11
3	Finland (FIN)	5	2	1	8
4	Germany (GER)	4	4	3	11
5	Romania (ROM)	4	3	3	10
6	Spain (ESP)	3	4	3	10
7	Poland (POL)	3	1	5	9
8	Ukraine (UKR)	3	0	2	5
9	Russia (RUS)	2	6	1	9
10	Bulgaria (BUL)	2	2	3	7
11	Netherlands (NED)	2	2	2	6
12	Belgium (BEL)	1	0	0	1
12	Portugal (POR)	1	0	0	1
14	Belarus (BLR)	0	4	0	4
15	Italy (ITA)	0	3	1	4
16	Switzerland (SUI)	0	3	0	3
17	Sweden (SWE)	0	2	1	3
18	Yugoslavia (YUG)	0	1	1	2
19	Albania (ALB)	0	1	0	1
20	Czech Republic (CZE)	0	0	2	2
20	Greece (GRE)	0	0	2	2
22	Denmark (DEN)	0	0	1	1
22	Slovenia (SLO)	0	0	1	1
Totals (23 entries)		41	42	40	123
