= 2007 European Athletics Indoor Championships – Women's 60 metres =

The Women's 60 metres event at the 2007 European Athletics Indoor Championships was held on March 3–4.

== Medalists ==
| Gold | Silver | Bronze |
|---|---|---|
| Kim Gevaert; Belgium | Yevgeniya Polyakova; Russia | Daria Onyśko; Poland |

== Results ==
=== Heats ===
First 2 of each heat (Q) and the next 6 fastest (q) qualified for the semifinals.

| Rank | Heat | Name | Nationality | Time | Notes |
|---|---|---|---|---|---|
| 1 | 3 | Kim Gevaert | Belgium | 7.17 | Q |
| 2 | 4 | Yevgeniya Polyakova | Russia | 7.18 | Q |
| 3 | 2 | Tezdzhan Naimova | Bulgaria | 7.22 | Q |
| 4 | 2 | Johanna Manninen | Finland | 7.23 | Q, SB |
| 5 | 1 | Susanna Kallur | Sweden | 7.25 | Q |
| 6 | 5 | Ekaterini Thanou | Greece | 7.26 | Q |
| 7 | 2 | Jeanette Kwakye | Great Britain | 7.27 | Q |
| 7 | 5 | Bettina Müller-Weissina | Austria | 7.27 | Q, SB |
| 9 | 4 | Verena Sailer | Germany | 7.28 | Q |
| 10 | 1 | Marina Kislova | Russia | 7.29 | Q |
| 10 | 4 | Montell Douglas | Great Britain | 7.29 | q |
| 12 | 1 | Joice Maduaka | Great Britain | 7.30 | q |
| 12 | 1 | Yeoryia Kokloni | Greece | 7.30 | q, SB |
| 12 | 5 | Anna Boyle | Ireland | 7.30 | q, NR |
| 15 | 1 | Daria Onyśko | Poland | 7.31 | q |
| 15 | 3 | Magdalena Khristova | Bulgaria | 7.31 | Q |
| 17 | 3 | Yuliya Gushchina | Russia | 7.31 | |
| 18 | 4 | Alena Neumiarzhytskaya | Belarus | 7.32 | |
| 19 | 1 | Ezinne Okparaebo | Norway | 7.33 | NR |
| 19 | 5 | Merlene Ottey | Slovenia | 7.33 | |
| 21 | 2 | Dorota Jędrusińska | Poland | 7.35 | |
| 22 | 4 | Daniela Graglia | Italy | 7.36 | |
| 23 | 5 | Ilona Ranta | Finland | 7.37 | |
| 24 | 5 | Sina Schielke | Germany | 7.38 | |
| 25 | 3 | Iryna Shtanhyeyeva | Ukraine | 7.40 | |
| 26 | 3 | Anita Pistone | Italy | 7.43 | |
| 27 | 4 | Sari Keskitalo | Finland | 7.44 | |
| 28 | 4 | Nina Kovačič | Slovenia | 7.45 | |
| 29 | 2 | Lina Grinčikaitė | Lithuania | 7.47 | |
| 30 | 3 | Pia Tajnikar | Slovenia | 7.48 | |
| 31 | 2 | Fabienne Weyermann | Switzerland | 7.49 | |
| 31 | 3 | Belén Recio | Spain | 7.49 | |
| 33 | 2 | Sónia Tavares | Portugal | 7.58 | |
| 33 | 5 | Zanda Grava | Latvia | 7.58 | |
| 35 | 1 | Diane Borg | Malta | 7.60 | NR |
| 36 | 5 | Charlene Attard | Malta | 7.82 | SB |

=== Semifinals ===
First 4 of each semifinals qualified directly (Q) for the final.

| Rank | Heat | Name | Nationality | Time | Notes |
|---|---|---|---|---|---|
| 1 | 2 | Kim Gevaert | Belgium | 7.10 | Q, NR |
| 2 | 1 | Jeanette Kwakye | Great Britain | 7.17 | Q, SB |
| 3 | 1 | Yevgeniya Polyakova | Russia | 7.22 | Q |
| 3 | 2 | Ekaterini Thanou | Greece | 7.22 | Q |
| 5 | 1 | Daria Onyśko | Poland | 7.24 | Q |
| 5 | 1 | Tezdzhan Naimova | Bulgaria | 7.24 | Q |
| 5 | 1 | Johanna Manninen | Finland | 7.24 | |
| 5 | 2 | Susanna Kallur | Sweden | 7.24 | Q, PB |
| 9 | 2 | Magdalena Khristova | Bulgaria | 7.27 | Q |
| 10 | 2 | Montell Douglas | Great Britain | 7.28 | |
| 11 | 2 | Marina Kislova | Russia | 7.29 | |
| 12 | 2 | Joice Maduaka | Great Britain | 7.30 | SB |
| 13 | 2 | Verena Sailer | Germany | 7.32 | |
| 14 | 1 | Anna Boyle | Ireland | 7.36 | |
| 15 | 1 | Bettina Müller-Weissina | Austria | 7.36 | |
| 16 | 1 | Yeoryia Kokloni | Greece | 7.37 | |

=== Final ===
| Rank | Lane | Name | Nationality | Time | Notes |
|---|---|---|---|---|---|
| 1st place, gold medalist(s) | 3 | Kim Gevaert | Belgium | 7.12 | |
| 2nd place, silver medalist(s) | 6 | Yevgeniya Polyakova | Russia | 7.18 | |
| 3rd place, bronze medalist(s) | 1 | Daria Onyśko | Poland | 7.20 | PB |
| 4 | 4 | Jeanette Kwakye | Great Britain | 7.20 | |
| 5 | 8 | Tezdzhan Naimova | Bulgaria | 7.22 | |
| 6 | 5 | Ekaterini Thanou | Greece | 7.26 | |
| 7 | 7 | Susanna Kallur | Sweden | 7.29 | |
| 8 | 2 | Magdalena Khristova | Bulgaria | 7.33 | |
