= Edith Eduviere =

Nigerian footballer

Personal information
- Date of birth: 18 June 1986 (age 40)
- Place of birth: Nigeria
- Position: Midfielder

Senior career*
Years	Team	Apps	(Gls)
2008	FCT Queens		

International career
2002	Nigeria U-19		
2008	Nigeria	0 (?)	(0)
- * Club domestic league appearances and goals

Edith Eduviere (born 18 June 1986) is a female Nigerian football midfielder.

She was part of the Nigeria women's national football team at the 2008 Summer Olympics. She was also selected in the Nigeria U-19 squad.

== See also ==
- Nigeria at the 2008 Summer Olympics
