= 1997 European Athletics U23 Championships – Women's 100 metres =

The women's 100 metres event at the 1997 European Athletics U23 Championships was held in Turku, Finland, on 10 and 11 July 1997.

== Medalists ==
Gold	Nora Ivanova; Bulgaria
Silver	Esther Möller; Germany
Bronze	Marie Joëlle Dogbo; France

== Results ==
=== Final ===
11 July
Wind: 1.6 m/s

Rank	Name	Nationality	Time	Notes
1st place, gold medalist(s)	Nora Ivanova	Bulgaria	11.50	
2nd place, silver medalist(s)	Esther Möller	Germany	11.53	
3rd place, bronze medalist(s)	Marie Joëlle Dogbo	France	11.54	
4	Manuela Levorato	Italy	11.56	
5	Katia Benth	France	11.56	
6	Tatyana Lukyanenko	Ukraine	11.66	
7	Yelena Tishkova	Russia	11.79	
8	Vyara Georgieva	Bulgaria	11.80	

=== Heats ===
10 July
Qualified: first 3 in each heat and 2 best to the Final

==== Heat 1 ====
Wind: 2.5 m/s

Rank	Name	Nationality	Time	Notes
1	Esther Möller	Germany	11.44 w	Q
2	Manuela Levorato	Italy	11.52 w	Q
3	Marie Joëlle Dogbo	France	11.56 w	Q
4	Vyara Georgieva	Bulgaria	11.62 w	q
5	Yelena Tishkova	Russia	11.64 w	q
6	Annika Amundin	Sweden	11.81 w	
7	Kristina Lörincz	Hungary	11.94 w	

==== Heat 2 ====
Wind: 1.6 m/s

Rank	Name	Nationality	Time	Notes
1	Katia Benth	France	11.43	Q
2	Nora Ivanova	Bulgaria	11.44	Q
3	Tatyana Lukyanenko	Ukraine	11.56	Q
4	Yuliya Vertyanova	Russia	11.72	
5	Monica Giolli	Italy	11.81	
6	Victoria Gunnarsson	Sweden	11.85	
7	Raquel Fraguas	Spain	11.86	

== Participation ==
According to an unofficial count, 14 athletes from 9 countries participated in the event.

- Bulgaria (2)
- France (2)
- Germany (1)
- Hungary (1)
- Italy (2)
- Russia (2)
- Spain (1)
- Sweden (2)
- Ukraine (1)
