= 1999 European Athletics U23 Championships – Women's 100 metres hurdles =

The women's 100 metres hurdles event at the 1999 European Athletics U23 Championships was held in Gothenburg, Sweden, at Ullevi on 31 July and 1 August 1999.

== Medalists ==
Gold	Agnieszka Karaczun; Poland
Silver	Julie Pratt; United Kingdom
Bronze	Eva Miklos; Romania

== Results ==
=== Final ===
1 August
Wind: -0.4 m/s

Rank	Name	Nationality	Time	Notes
1st place, gold medalist(s)	Agnieszka Karaczun	Poland	13.32	
2nd place, silver medalist(s)	Julie Pratt	United Kingdom	13.40	
3rd place, bronze medalist(s)	Eva Miklos	Romania	13.40	
4	Tessy Prediger	Germany	13.43	
5	Juliane Sprenger	Germany	13.46	
6	Urška Beti	Slovenia	13.52	
7	Hanna Korell	Finland	13.63	
8	Johanna Halkoaho	Finland	13.75	

=== Heats ===
31 July
Qualified: first 2 in each heat and 2 best to the Final

==== Heat 1 ====
Wind: -1.2 m/s

Rank	Name	Nationality	Time	Notes
1	Eva Miklos	Romania	13.42	Q
2	Juliane Sprenger	Germany	13.44	Q
3	Karin Jönsson	Sweden	13.75	
4	Nadia Weber	Switzerland	13.76	
5	Bianca Liston	United Kingdom	13.94	
6	Petra Lam	Finland	14.05	
7	Joanna Bujak	France	23.80	

==== Heat 2 ====
Wind: 2.6 m/s

Rank	Name	Nationality	Time	Notes
1	Julie Pratt	United Kingdom	13.29 w	Q
2	Tessy Prediger	Germany	13.43 w	Q
3	Hanna Korell	Finland	13.46 w	q
4	Lydie Potin	France	13.62 w	
5	Natalya Chulkova	Russia	13.73 w	
6	Miriam Tschomba	Belgium	13.74 w	

==== Heat 3 ====
Wind: 1.5 m/s

Rank	Name	Nationality	Time	Notes
1	Urška Beti	Slovenia	13.32	Q
2	Agnieszka Karaczun	Poland	13.33	Q
3	Johanna Halkoaho	Finland	13.55	q
4	Sarah Claxton	United Kingdom	13.59	
5	Tetyana Ledovska	Ukraine	13.67	
6	Cynthia Octavia	France	14.09	

== Participation ==
According to an unofficial count, 19 athletes from 12 countries participated in the event.

- Belgium (1)
- Finland (3)
- France (3)
- Germany (2)
- Poland (1)
- Romania (1)
- Russia (1)
- Slovenia (1)
- Sweden (1)
- Switzerland (1)
- Ukraine (1)
- United Kingdom (3)
