= Osazuwa =

- Gender: Male
- Language(s): Edo

Origin
- Word/name: Nigeria
- Meaning: God allocates wealth

Osazuwa is a Bini surname. Notable people with the surname include:

- Agnes Osazuwa (born 1989), Nigerian sprinter
- Uhunoma Osazuwa (born 1987), Nigerian heptathlete
