= 1999 European Athletics U23 Championships – Women's 400 metres hurdles =

The women's 400 metres hurdles event at the 1999 European Athletics U23 Championships was held in Gothenburg, Sweden, at Ullevi on 29 and 30 July 1999.

== Medalists ==
Gold	Natasha Danvers; Great Britain
Silver	Ulrike Urbansky; Germany
Bronze	Anika Ahrens; Germany

== Results ==
=== Final ===
30 July

Rank	Name	Nationality	Time	Notes
1st place, gold medalist(s)	Natasha Danvers	Great Britain	56.00	CR
2nd place, silver medalist(s)	Ulrike Urbansky	Germany	56.08	
3rd place, bronze medalist(s)	Anika Ahrens	Germany	57.34	
4	Irina Yemelyanova	Russia	57.36	
5	Cindy Éga	France	57.93	
6	Nadja Petersen	Sweden	58.37	
7	Aleksandra Pielużek	Poland	59.16	
8	Olivia Abderrhamane	France	59.34	

=== Heats ===
29 July
Qualified: first 2 in each heat and 2 best to the Final

==== Heat 1 ====
Rank	Name	Nationality	Time	Notes
1	Ulrike Urbansky	Germany	56.66	Q, CR
2	Olivia Abderrhamane	France	58.18	Q
3	Nadja Petersen	Sweden	58.23	q
4	Chrisoula Goudenoúidi	Greece	58.28	
5	Ieva Zunda	Latvia	58.32	
6	Elke Bogemans	Belgium	58.33	
7	Anja Rantanen	Finland	59.39	

==== Heat 2 ====
Rank	Name	Nationality	Time	Notes
1	Cindy Éga	France	58.11	Q
2	Aleksandra Pielużek	Poland	58.37	Q
3	Christina Panádou	Greece	58.44	
4	Inna Konovalenko	Belarus	58.92	
5	Anna Olichwierczuk	Poland	59.60	
6	Beatriz Moreno	Spain	60.65	

==== Heat 3 ====
Rank	Name	Nationality	Time	Notes
1	Irina Yemelyanova	Russia	57.33	Q
2	Natasha Danvers	Great Britain	58.21	Q
3	Anika Ahrens	Germany	58.21	q
4	Thelma Joziasse	Netherlands	58.90	
5	Florence Delaune	France	58.94	
6	Sanja Tripković	Yugoslavia	60.60	

== Participation ==
According to an unofficial count, 19 athletes from 14 countries participated in the event.

- Belarus (1)
- Belgium (1)
- Finland (1)
- France (3)
- Germany (2)
- Great Britain (1)
- Greece (2)
- Latvia (1)
- Netherlands (1)
- Poland (2)
- Russia (1)
- Spain (1)
- Sweden (1)
- Yugoslavia (1)
