= Johanna Halkoaho =

Finnish 100m hurdler and long jumper (born 1977)

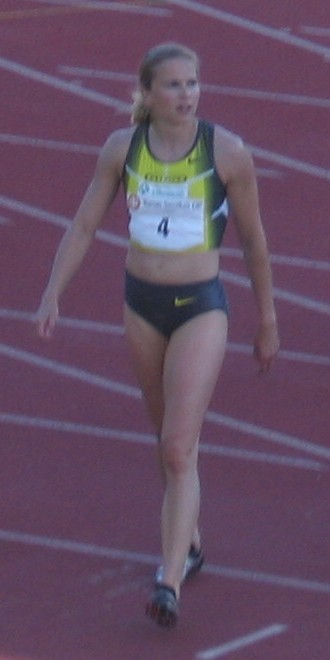
- Johanna Halkoaho in 2009

Personal information
- Born: 13 January 1997 (age 29) Suodenniemi, Finland
- Height: 165 cm (5 ft 5 in)
- Weight: 55 kg (121 lb)

Sport
- Club: Suodenniemen Urheilijat
Medal record
Women's athletics
Representing Finland
World Junior Championships
Silver medal – second place	1996 Sydney	Heptathlon
Bronze medal – third place	1996 Sydney	Long jump
European Athletics U23 Championships
Bronze medal – third place	1997 Turku	100 m hurdles

Johanna Miia Maria Halkoaho (born 13 January 1977) is a Finnish athlete. She won two medals at the 1996 World Junior Championships: a bronze in long jump and a silver in heptathlon. She is also the national indoor champion in the 60 meters hurdles and long jump in 2003, 2004 & 2006 national champion in 100 meters hurdles.

Halkoaho's 100 meters hurdles personal best is 13:23, which she achieved in Lappeenranta on 21 July 2005 with a 0.2 m/s wind. Her 2006 season best is 13:24, which she achieved in Helsinki on 26 July 2006 in the IAAF Grand Prix GE Money Grand Prix, with a 0.6 m/s wind.

Halkoaho's long jump personal best is 6.79 meters, which she achieved in Budapest on 28 August 1998 with a 0.2 m/s wind. She has not competed in the long jump in the 2006 season but her best from 2005 was 6.21, her best jump aside from her PB in 1998 is 6.63 meters, which came on 13 July 2003 in Lapinlahti (1.5 m/s wind).

== Personal life ==
She has a younger sister called Jenniina, who is also an athlete.

== Achievements ==
Year	Competition	Venue	Position	Event	Notes
Representing Finland
1994	World Junior Championships	Lisbon, Portugal	15th (q)	Long jump	6.01 m (wind: +1.8 m/s)
1996	World Junior Championships	Sydney, Australia	3rd	Long jump	6.38 m (wind: +0.5 m/s)
1996	World Junior Championships	Sydney, Australia	2nd	Heptathlon	5656 pts
1996	World Junior Championships	Sydney, Australia	—	4 × 100 m relay	DQ
1997	European U23 Championships	Turku, Finland	3rd	100m hurdles	13.35 (wind: 1.9 m/s)
1997	European U23 Championships	Turku, Finland	—	Long jump	NM
1997	World Championships	Athens, Greece	31st (h)	100 m hurdles	13.52
1998	European Championships	Budapest, Hungary	19th (h)	100 m hurdles	13.69
1998	European Championships	Budapest, Hungary	10th (q)	Long jump	6.54 m
1999	European U23 Championships	Gothenburg, Sweden	8th	100m hurdles	13.75 (wind: -0.4 m/s)
1999	European U23 Championships	Gothenburg, Sweden	—	Long jump	NM
2002	European Championships	Munich, Germany	21st (h)	100 m hurdles	13.45
2003	World Championships	Paris, France	15th (q)	Long jump	6.41 m
2005	Universiade	İzmir, Turkey	13th (sf)	100 m hurdles	13.69
2005	Universiade	İzmir, Turkey	7th	Long jump	6.21 m
2006	European Championships	Gothenburg, Sweden	25th (h)	100 m hurdles	13.47
2007	European Indoor Championships	Birmingham, United Kingdom	15th (h)	60 m hurdles	8.41
