= Irena Sznajder =

Polish sprinter

Personal information
- Born: 7 January 1977 (age 49) Bydgoszcz, Poland

Sport
- Sport: Track and field
Medal record
Representing Poland
Summer Universiade
Silver medal – second place	1999 Palma de Mallorca	4x100m relay
European U23 Championships
Bronze medal – third place	1999 Gothenburg	4x100m relay

Irena Sznajder (born 7 January 1977) is a retired Polish sprinter who specialized in the 100 metres.

She finished seventh in 4 x 100 metres relay at the 1999 World Championships, together with teammates Zuzanna Radecka, Monika Borejza and Joanna Balcerczak.

Her personal best time is 11.54 seconds, achieved in July 1999 in Kraków.
