= Martina Feusi =

Swiss bobsledder (born 1974)

Personal information
- Nationality: Swiss
- Born: 17 June 1974 (age 50); Zürich, Switzerland

Sport
- Sport: Bobsleigh

Martina Feusi (born 17 June 1974) is a Swiss bobsledder. She competed in the two woman event at the 2006 Winter Olympics.
