= Alexis Joyce =

American sprinter (born 1983)

Alexis Joyce (born September 5, 1983) is an American sprinter who specialized in the 100 metres.

Joyce competed for the South Carolina Gamecocks track and field team in the NCAA.

In 60 metres she finished eighth at the 2008 IAAF World Indoor Championships.

Her personal best time over 100 m is 11.45 seconds, achieved in April 2001 in Denver. Her personal best time over 60 m is 7.21 seconds, achieved in February 2008 in Boston.
