= 1997 European Athletics U23 Championships – Women's 100 metres hurdles =

The women's 100 metres hurdles event at the 1997 European Athletics U23 Championships was held in Turku, Finland, on 11 July 1997.

== Medalists ==
Gold	Irina Korotya; Russia
Silver	Diane Allahgreen; Great Britain
Bronze	Johanna Halkoaho; Finland

== Results ==
=== Final ===
11 July
Wind: 1.9 m/s

Rank	Name	Nationality	Time	Notes
1st place, gold medalist(s)	Irina Korotya	Russia	12.97	
2nd place, silver medalist(s)	Diane Allahgreen	Great Britain	13.03	
3rd place, bronze medalist(s)	Johanna Halkoaho	Finland	13.35	
4	Aurelia Trywiańska	Poland	13.50	
5	Sandra Turpin	Portugal	13.53	
6	Evelina Peltola	Finland	13.56	
7	Natalya Davydenko	Russia	13.82	
	Yelena Ovcharova	Ukraine	DNF	

=== Heats ===
11 July
Qualified: first 2 in each heat and 2 best to the Final

==== Heat 1 ====
Wind: 1.8 m/s

Rank	Name	Nationality	Time	Notes
1	Irina Korotya	Russia	13.34	Q
2	Sandra Turpin	Portugal	13.58	Q
3	Nikola Špinová	Czech Republic	13.65	
4	Nadia Waeber	Switzerland	13.70	
5	Anna Pettersson	Sweden	13.87	
6	Dragana Ciganović	Croatia	14.33	

==== Heat 2 ====
Wind: 1.3 m/s

Rank	Name	Nationality	Time	Notes
1	Yelena Ovcharova	Ukraine	13.43	Q
2	Evelina Peltola	Finland	13.55	Q
3	Aurelia Trywiańska	Poland	13.59	q
4	Natalya Davydenko	Russia	13.59	q
5	Raquel Fraguas	Spain	14.19	
	Deborah den Boer	Netherlands	DNF	

==== Heat 3 ====
Wind: 1.0 m/s

Rank	Name	Nationality	Time	Notes
1	Diane Allahgreen	Great Britain	13.27	Q
2	Johanna Halkoaho	Finland	13.48	Q
3	Alexandra Keil	Germany	13.96	
4	Miriam Tschomba	Belgium	14.04	
5	Jessica Rodríguez	Spain	14.12	
6	Edit Vári	Hungary	14.35	

== Participation ==
According to an unofficial count, 18 athletes from 15 countries participated in the event.

- Belgium (1)
- Croatia (1)
- Czech Republic (1)
- Finland (2)
- Germany (1)
- Great Britain (1)
- Hungary (1)
- Netherlands (1)
- Poland (1)
- Portugal (1)
- Russia (2)
- Spain (2)
- Sweden (1)
- Switzerland (1)
- Ukraine (1)
