= Andrea Anderson =

American sprinter

Personal information
- Full name: Andrea Arlene Anderson
- Born: September 17, 1977 (age 49) Harbor City, Los Angeles, U.S.
Medal record
Women's athletics
Representing United States
Olympic Games
Gold medal – first place	Sydney 2000	4 × 400 m relay
Pan American Games
Silver medal – second place	1999 Winnipeg	4 × 400 m relay
World Junior Championships
Gold medal – first place	1996 Sydney	4 × 100 m relay
Silver medal – second place	1996 Sydney	100 metres
World University Games
Gold medal – first place	1997 Catania	4 × 100 m relay

Andrea Arlene Anderson (born September 17, 1977) is an American track and field athlete best remembered for winning a gold medal on the 4 × 400 meters relay team at the 2000 Summer Olympics in Sydney, Australia. She ran in the preliminaries and semi-finals. Anderson subsequently had to return her medal along with the rest of the team after Marion Jones was disqualified following her admission to using performance-enhancing drugs. On July 16, 2010, the Court of Arbitration for Sport ruled in favor of the other American teammates and returned the medals.

Anderson has had rare success at both long sprints and short sprint races. She ran in high school for Long Beach Polytechnic High School, joining Aminah Haddad to make for a powerful 1-2 sprinting punch. The two finished just behind Jones in both the 1992 and 1993 CIF California State Meet 100 metres and 200 metres, while teaming up on the 4 × 100 metres relay team that won the state title in 1993 and the 4 × 400 metres relay that won three straight championships 1991 to 1993.

She ran collegiately at the University of California, Los Angeles (UCLA) under Bob Kersee. Running for UCLA, she won the Pac-10 championships at 200 metres in 1997, 400 metres in 1998 and 1999. Her 4 × 100 m relay team finished as high as 3rd at the NCAA Women's Outdoor Track and Field Championship in 1998 and the 4 × 400 m relay team finished 2nd in 1999.

At the 1995 Pan American Junior Games, she ran on the winning 4 × 100 m relay and the silver medal-winning 4 × 400 m relay. The following year at the 1996 World Junior Championships in Athletics she got a preview of the Sydney track while winning a gold medal on the USA 4 × 100 m relay and taking an individual silver medal in the 100 metres, setting her lifetime PR of 11.43. In 1997 she was on the winning 4 × 100 m relay at the World University Games. In 1999, she ran on the 4 × 400 m relay team that took the silver medal at the Pan American Games. In 2000, at the US Olympic Trials, she ran her personal best of 51.18 in the 400 to make the team. Earlier that season she also set her personal record in the 200 metres of 23.44 at the Modesto Relays.

She is the older sister of football's Marques Anderson.
