= Yuliya Chermoshanskaya =

Russian sprinter (born 1986)

Yulia Chermoshanskaya
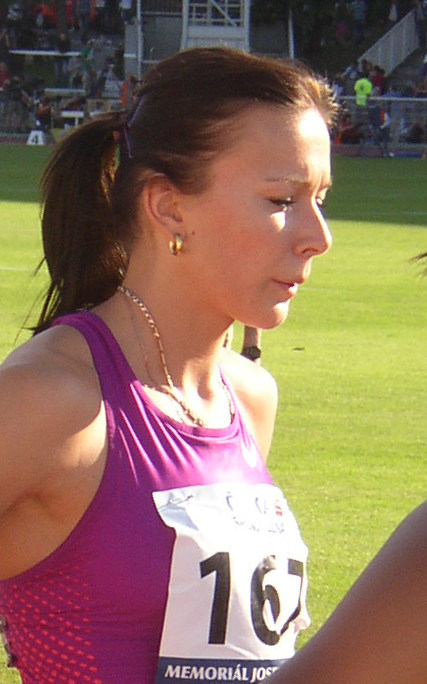
- Chermoshanskaya at the 2010 Josef Odložil Memorial in Prague

Personal information
- Native name: Юлия Игоревна Чермошанская
- Full name: Yuliya Igorevna Chermoshanskaya
- Born: 6 January 1986 (age 40) Bryansk, Russian SFSR
- Height: 1.74 m (5 ft 9 in)
Medal record
Women's athletics
Representing Russia
Olympic Games
Disqualified	2008 Beijing	4 × 100 relay
European U23 Championships
Gold medal – first place	2007 Debrecen	200 m
Gold medal – first place	2007 Debrecen	4 × 100 m relay
Summer Universiade
Gold medal – first place	2005 Izmir	4 × 100 m relay
European Junior Championships
Gold medal – first place	2005 Kaunas	200 m
Silver medal – second place	2005 Kaunas	4 × 100 m relay

Yuliya Igorevna Chermoshanskaya (Russian: Юлия Игоревна Чермошанская; born 6 January 1986 in Bryansk, Russian SFSR) is a Russian track and field athlete. She competed at the 2008 Summer Olympics in the 4 × 100 metres relay. She is the daughter of former sprinter Galina Malchugina.

== Career ==
Chermoshanskaya represented Russia at the 2008 Summer Olympics in Beijing, competing in the 4 × 100 metres relay with partners Aleksandra Fedoriva, Yulia Gushchina and Yevgeniya Polyakova. In their first round heat, they placed second behind Jamaica. Their time of 42.87 seconds was also the second time overall out of sixteen participating nations. With this result, they qualified for the final, in which they sprinted to 42.31 seconds, the first place and the gold medal. Belgium and Nigeria took the other medals.

Chermoshanskaya participated in the 2010 European Championships in the 4 × 100 metres relay and the 200 metres. In the relay final, along with Yuna Mekhti-Zade, Aleksandra Fedoriva and Yulia Gushchina, they finished fourth behind Ukraine, France and Poland. In the 200 metre competition, she won her heat in a time of 23.10 secs, which was good enough to advance. In her semifinal, she finished second in an improved time of 22.88, behind Ukrainian Yelizaveta Bryzhina. She then went into the final as the overall, fifth fastest athlete. In the final, she ran a season's best of 22.67 which finished her in seventh place, and last of the actual race finishes as Véronique Mang was disqualified for a false start.

=== Doping case ===
In May 2016, it was reported that Chermoshanskya was one of 14 Russian athletes, and nine medalists, implicated in doping following the retesting of urine from the 2008 Olympic Games. Chermoshanskya was named by Russian press agency TASS as having failed the retest, which was undertaken following the Russian doping scandal of 2015 and 2016. Under IOC and IAAF rules, Chermonshanskya stood to lose all results, medals and records from the date of the original test to May 2016. In August 2016, she and her three Russian teammates were stripped of their Olympic gold medal.

In May 2017, she was disqualified for two years.
