= Fabé Dia =

Italian sprinter

Personal information
- Full name: Amy Fabé Dia-Longo
- Nationality: French (until 2009); Italian (since 2009)
- Born: 14 February 1977 (age 49) Creil, France
- Height: 172 cm (5 ft 8 in)
- Weight: 64 kg (141 lb)
- Spouse: Andrea Longo

Sport
- Sport: Athletics
- Event: Sprinting
Medal record
Women's athletics
Representing France
World Championships
Silver medal – second place	1999 Seville	4 x 100 m relay
European U23 Championships
Gold medal – first place	1999 Gothenburg	4 x 100 m relay
Mediterranean Games
Gold medal – first place	2001 Radès	4 x 100 m relay
Gold medal – first place	2005 Almería	4 x 100 m relay
Silver medal – second place	2001 Radès	200 m
Bronze medal – third place	2005 Almería	200 m

Amy Fabé Dia-Longo (born 14 February 1977) is a French-Italian sprint athlete who specializes in the 200 metres.

She became an Italian citizen on 12 May 2009 through her marriage to Italian middle-distance runner Andrea Longo.

== Biography ==
Dia won the silver medal at the 1995 European Junior Championships. She competed at the 1995 World Indoor Championships, the 1998 European Championships, the 1999 World Indoor Championships, the 2001 World Indoor Championships, the 2001 World Championships, the 2002 European Indoor Championships and the 2002 European Championships without reaching the final. Then, she finally reached the final at the 2002 European Indoor Championships and finished sixth. She won the silver medal at the 2001 Mediterranean Games and the bronze medal at the 2005 Mediterranean Games.

In the 4 × 100 metres relay she finished fourth at the 2000 Olympic Games, and fourth at the 2005 World Championships. At the 1999 World Championships she ran in the heats, but not in the final.

Her personal best times are 7.33 seconds in the 60 metres (indoor), achieved in January 2000 in Eaubonne; 11.54 seconds in the 100 metres, achieved in June 2005 in Florence; and 23.02 seconds in the 200 metres, achieved in June 1999 in Villeneuve-d'Ascq.
