= Yuliya Akulenko =

Ukrainian heptathlete

Personal information
- Full name: Yuliya Yuriïvna Akulenko
- Nationality: Ukraine
- Born: 3 July 1977 (age 49) Dnipropetrovsk, Ukrainian; SSR, Soviet Union
- Height: 1.73 m (5 ft 8 in)
- Weight: 53 kg (117 lb)

Sport
- Sport: Athletics
- Event: Heptathlon
- Club: Dynamo Dnipropetrovsk

Achievements and titles
- Personal bests: Heptathlon: 6203 points (2004)

Yuliya Yuriïvna Akulenko (Ukrainian: Юлiя Юрiївна Акуленко; born 3 July 1977 in Dnipropetrovsk) is a retired Ukrainian heptathlete. She represented her nation Ukraine at the 2004 Summer Olympics, finishing in twenty-third position, and also set her own personal best of 6203 points at a national meeting in Kyiv. Akulenko is also a member of the track and field squad for Dynamo Dnipropetrovsk.

Akulenko qualified for the Ukrainian squad in the women's heptathlon at the 2004 Summer Olympics in Athens, by attaining an IAAF A-standard and a personal best of 6203 points at the national meet in Kyiv. Despite that she threw the javelin for a higher position to spare herself from behind, Akulenko managed to finish a respectable twenty-third with a total score of 5996, trailing her teammate Nataliya Dobrynska by a wide 259-point gap.
