= Nanceen Perry =

American sprinter

Personal information
- Born: April 19, 1977 (age 49) Fairfield, Texas, United States

Sport
- Sport: Track and field
Medal record
Representing United States
Olympic Games
Bronze medal – third place	2000 Sydney	4×100m relay
Summer Universiade
Gold medal – first place	1999 Palma de Mallorca	4x100m relay
Bronze medal – third place	1999 Palma de Mallorca	200m

Nanceen Lavern Perry (born April 19, 1977) is a former sprinter from the United States.

She competed in the 4×100 meters relay in Sydney 2000, but her bronze medal was stripped after confessions of steroid doping by teammate Marion Jones. Seven relay teammates successfully appealed the IOC decision, and the medals were restored in July, 2010. Nanceen Perry did not participate in the appeal. Nonetheless, the overturn of the IOC decision restored Perry's bronze medal. Perry also ran in the 200 meters, but finished last in her semi-final round race.

Perry ran for the University of Texas, where she holds the school record in the 200 meters. She was the 2000 American Indoor champion in the event.

I didn't have any form, I just got out there and turned left.

She was inducted into the Longhorn Hall of Fame in 2009.

== Personal bests ==
- 100 metres - 11.15 s (1999)
- 200 metres - 22.38 s (2000)
