= 1996 World Junior Championships in Athletics =

- Host city: Sydney, Australia
- Nations: 142
- Athletes: 1049
- Events: 41
- Dates: August 20–25
- Main venue: Sydney International Athletic Centre

The 1996 World Junior Championships in Athletics were held in Sydney, Australia on August 20–25.

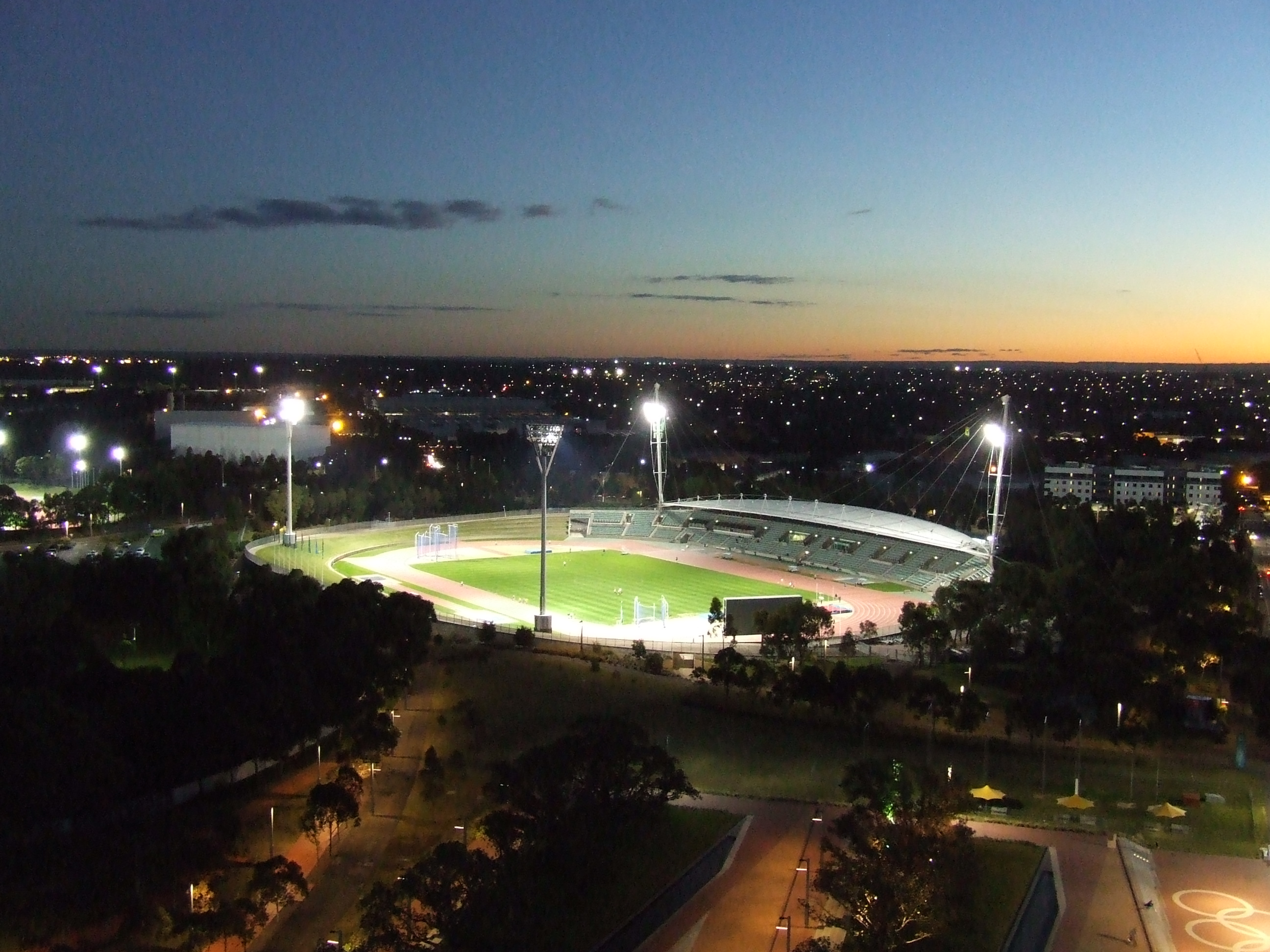
The host stadium in Sydney.

== Results ==
=== Men ===
Event	Gold		Silver		Bronze	
100 metres	Francis Obikwelu; Nigeria	10.21	Seun Ogunkoya; Nigeria	10.25	Francesco Scuderi; Italy	10.43
200 metres	Francis Obikwelu; Nigeria	20.47	Riaan Dempers; South Africa	20.96	Bryan Harrison; United States	21.10
400 metres	Obea Moore; United States	45.27	Jerome Davis; United States	45.86	Shane Niemi; Canada	45.94
800 metres	Joseph Mutua; Kenya	1:48.21	Tom Lerwill; Great Britain	1:48.40	Grant Cremer; Australia	1:48.46
1500 metres	Shadrack Langat; Kenya	3:38.96	Mohamed Yagoub Babiker; Sudan	3:39.17	Miloud Abaoub; Algeria	3:39.37
5000 metres	Assefa Mezgebu; Ethiopia	13:35.30 CR	David Chelule; Kenya	13:36.27	Aaron Gabonewe; South Africa	13:46.19
10,000 metres	Assefa Mezgebu; Ethiopia	28:27.78	David Chelule; Kenya	28:29.14	Tetsuhiro Furuta; Japan	28:31.61
110 metres hurdles	Yoel Hernández; Cuba	13.83	Tomasz Scigaczewski; Poland	13.88	Jovesa Naivalu; Fiji	13.91
400 metres hurdles	Mubarak Al-Nubi; Qatar	49.07 CR	Llewellyn Herbert; South Africa	49.15	Angelo Taylor; United States	50.18
3000 metres steeplechase	Julius Chelule; Kenya	8:33.09	Kipkurui Misoi; Kenya	8:33.31	Ali Ezzine; Morocco	8:35.60
10,000 metres walk	Paquillo Fernández; Spain	40:38.25	David Márquez; Spain	41:03.73	Nathan Deakes; Australia	41:11.44
4 × 100 metres relay	United States; Vince Williams; Jerome Davis; Obea Moore; Lawrence Armstrong	39.36	France; Vincent Caure; Didier Héry; Ruddy Zami; David Patros	39.47	Australia; Peter Missingham; David Baxter; Paul Pearce; Paul Di Bella	39.62
4 × 400 metres relay	United States; Desmond Johnson; Jerome Davis; Robin Martin; Obea Moore	3:03.65	Japan; Hiroki Takahashi; Dai Tamesue; Masayuki Okusako; Shinji Morita	3:06.01	Great Britain; Kris Stewart; Tom Lerwill; Mark Rowlands; Geoff Dearman	3:06.76
High jump	Mark Boswell; Canada	2.24	Ben Challenger; Great Britain; Svatoslav Ton; Czech Republic	2.21	None awarded	None awarded
Pole vault	Paul Burgess; Australia	5.35	Patrik Kristiansson; Sweden	5.30	Danny Ecker; Germany	5.30
Long jump	Olexiy Lukashevych; Ukraine	7.91	Raúl Fernández; Spain	7.75	Nathan Morgan; Great Britain	7.74
Triple jump	René Hernández; Cuba	16.50	Michael Calvo; Cuba	16.17	Ionut Punga; Romania	16.15
Shot put	Ralf Bartels; Germany	18.71	Justin Anlezark; Australia	18.21	Clay Cross; Australia	17.69
Discus throw	Casey Malone; United States	56.22	Roland Varga; Hungary	55.20	Frank Casañas; Cuba	54.86
Javelin throw	Sergey Voynov; Uzbekistan	79.78	Harri Haatainen; Finland	76.12	Steven Madeo; Australia	73.88
Hammer throw	Maciej Palyszko; Poland	71.24	Vadim Devyatovskiy; Belarus	70.88	Roman Konevtsov; Russia	70.32
Decathlon	Attila Zsivoczky; Hungary	7582	Dean Macey; Great Britain	7480	Chiel Warners; Netherlands	7368
WR world record | AR area record | CR championship record | GR games record | NR national record | OR Olympic record | PB personal best | SB season best | WL world leading (in a given season)

=== Women ===
Event	Gold		Silver		Bronze	
100 metres	Nora Ivanova; Bulgaria	11.32	Andrea Anderson; United States	11.43	Esther Möller; Germany	11.46
200 metres	Sylviane Félix; France	23.16	Lauren Hewitt; Australia	23.32	Nora Ivanova; Bulgaria	23.59
400 metres	Andrea Burlacu; Romania	52.32	Suziann Reid; United States	53.17	Rosemary Hayward; Australia	53.28
800 metres	Claudia Gesell; Germany	2:02.67	Kathleen Friedrich; Germany	2:02.70	Jebet Langat; Kenya	2:03.21
1500 metres	Kutre Dulecha; Ethiopia	4:08.65	Jackline Maranga; Kenya	4:08.98	Shura Hutesa; Ethiopia	4:09.49
3000 metres	Anita Weyermann; Switzerland	8:50.73	Edna Kiplagat; Kenya	8:53.06	Etaferahu Tarekegne; Ethiopia	8:53.77
5000 metres	Ayelech Worku; Ethiopia	15:40.03	Olivera Jevtić; Yugoslavia	15:40.59	Cristina Iloc; Romania	15:41.44
100 metres hurdles	Joyce Bates; United States	13.27	Glory Alozie; Nigeria	13.30	Tan Yali; China	13.37
400 metres hurdles	Ulrike Urbansky; Germany	56.65	Vicki Jamison; Great Britain	57.57	Tanya Jarrett; Jamaica	57.91
5000 metres walk	Irina Stankina; Russia	21:31.85	Olga Panfyorova; Russia	21:52.27	Claudia Iovan; Romania	21:57.11
4 × 100 metres relay	United States; Andrea Anderson; Lakeesha White; Jernae Wright; Nanceen Perry	43.79	Jamaica; Tulia Robinson; Peta-Gaye Dowdie; Saran Patterson; Aleen Bailey	44.26	Germany; Sandra Abel; Esther Möller; Nancy Kette; Marion Wagner	44.57
4 × 400 metres relay	Germany; Peggy Müller; Claudia Gesell; Doreen Harstick; Ulrike Urbansky	3:31.12	Romania; Medina Tudor; Anca Safta; Otilia Ruicu; Andrea Burlacu	3:32.16	Australia; Jennifer Marshall; Tamsyn Lewis; Josephine Fowley; Rosemary Hayward	3:32.47
High jump	Yuliya Lyakhova; Russia	1.93	Dóra Győrffy; Hungary	1.91	Svetlana Lapina; Russia	1.91
Long jump	Guan Yingnan; China	6.53	Cristina Nicolau; Romania	6.47	Johanna Halkoaho; Finland	6.38
Triple jump	Tereza Marinova; Bulgaria	14.62 CR	Cristina Nicolau; Romania	13.64	Adelina Gavrilă; Romania	13.50
Shot put	Song Feina; China	16.58	Nadine Beckel; Germany	16.39	Yelena Ivanenko; Belarus	16.22
Discus throw	Ma Shuli; China	56.32	Seilala Sua; United States	56.32	Zhang Yaqing; China	55.70
Javelin throw	Osleidys Menéndez; Cuba	60.96	Nikolett Szabó; Hungary	58.34	Bina Ramesh; France	57.70
Heptathlon	Yelizaveta Shalygina; Russia	5711	Johanna Halkoaho; Finland	5656	Hana Doleželová; Czech Republic	5504
WR world record | AR area record | CR championship record | GR games record | NR national record | OR Olympic record | PB personal best | SB season best | WL world leading (in a given season)

== Medal table ==
* Host nation (Australia)

Rank	Nation	Gold	Silver	Bronze	Total
1	United States	6	4	2	12
2	Germany	4	2	3	9
3	Ethiopia	4	0	2	6
4	Kenya	3	5	1	9
5	Russia	3	1	2	6
6	Cuba	3	1	1	5
7	China	3	0	3	6
8	Nigeria	2	2	0	4
9	Bulgaria	2	0	1	3
10	Romania	1	3	4	8
11	Hungary	1	3	0	4
12	Australia*	1	2	7	10
13	Spain	1	2	0	3
14	France	1	1	1	3
15	Poland	1	1	0	2
16	Canada	1	0	1	2
17	Qatar	1	0	0	1
17	Switzerland	1	0	0	1
17	Ukraine	1	0	0	1
17	Uzbekistan	1	0	0	1
21	Great Britain	0	4	2	6
22	Finland	0	2	1	3
22	South Africa	0	2	1	3
24	Belarus	0	1	1	2
24	Jamaica	0	1	1	2
24	Japan	0	1	1	2
27	Czech Republic	0	1	0	1
27	Sudan	0	1	0	1
27	Sweden	0	1	0	1
27	Yugoslavia	0	1	0	1
31	Algeria	0	0	1	1
31	Fiji	0	0	1	1
31	Italy	0	0	1	1
31	Morocco	0	0	1	1
31	Netherlands	0	0	1	1
Totals (35 entries)		41	42	40	123

== Participation ==
According to an unofficial count through an unofficial result list, 1049 athletes from 142 countries participated in the event. This is in agreement with the official numbers as published.

- Albania (2)
- Algeria (12)
- Andorra (1)
- Anguilla (1)
- Antigua and Barbuda (1)
- Argentina (2)
- Armenia (1)
- Australia (54)
- Austria (5)
- Bahamas (5)
- Barbados (3)
- Belarus (9)
- Belgium (6)
- Benin (1)
- Bermuda (1)
- Bosnia and Herzegovina (2)
- Botswana (2)
- Brazil (24)
- Bulgaria (6)
- Burundi (2)
- Canada (12)
- Cayman Islands (1)
- Chile (1)
- China (28)
- Chinese Taipei (10)
- Colombia (5)
- Cook Islands (2)
- Costa Rica (1)
- Croatia (5)
- Cuba (17)
- Cyprus (4)
- Czech Republic (15)
- Denmark (4)
- Dominica (1)
- Egypt (2)
- El Salvador (1)
- Estonia (6)
- Ethiopia (9)
- Fiji (1)
- Finland (36)
- France (43)
- Gabon (1)
- Gambia (1)
- Georgia (2)
- Germany (65)
- Great Britain (36)
- Greece (25)
- Guam (1)
- Guatemala (1)
- Haiti (1)
- Honduras (1)
- Hong Kong (2)
- Hungary (24)
- India (2)
- Indonesia (7)
- Ireland (7)
- Israel (4)
- Italy (20)
- Jamaica (19)
- Japan (40)
- Kazakhstan (4)
- Kenya (19)
- Kuwait (1)
- Kyrgyzstan (1)
- Laos (1)
- Latvia (3)
- Lithuania (2)
- Luxembourg (1)
- Macedonia (1)
- Madagascar (1)
- Malawi (1)
- Malaysia (6)
- Maldives (1)
- Mauritania (1)
- Mauritius (1)
- Mexico (8)
- Moldova (2)
- Mongolia (1)
- Morocco (6)
- Myanmar (1)
- Namibia (5)
- Netherlands (9)
- Netherlands Antilles (1)
- New Zealand (13)
- Nigeria (7)
- Northern Mariana Islands (1)
- Norway (8)
- Pakistan (2)
- Palestine (1)
- Panama (1)
- Papua New Guinea (1)
- Paraguay (1)
- Peru (1)
- Philippines (2)
- Poland (21)
- Portugal (9)
- Puerto Rico (1)
- Qatar (8)
- Romania (19)
- Russia (43)
- Rwanda (3)
- Saint Lucia (1)
- San Marino (1)
- Senegal (1)
- Seychelles (2)
- Singapore (2)
- Slovakia (7)
- Slovenia (11)
- Solomon Islands (1)
- Somalia (1)
- South Africa (17)
- South Korea (10)
- Spain (32)
- Sri Lanka (1)
- Sudan (1)
- Swaziland (1)
- Sweden (12)
- Switzerland (7)
- Syria (1)
- Tajikistan (2)
- Tahiti (1)
- Tanzania (2)
- Thailand (4)
- Tonga (1)
- Trinidad and Tobago (2)
- Tunisia (2)
- Turkey (2)
- Turkmenistan (1)
- Turks and Caicos Islands (1)
- Uganda (4)
- Ukraine (12)
- United Arab Emirates (1)
- United States (62)
- Uruguay (2)
- Uzbekistan (1)
- Vanuatu (1)
- Western Samoa (1)
- Yemen (1)
- Yugoslavia (12)
- Zaire (1)
- Zambia (1)
- Zimbabwe (1)
