= Athletics at the 1997 Summer Universiade – Women's 100 metres =

The women's 100 metres event at the 1997 Summer Universiade was held on 28 and 29 August at the Stadio Cibali in Catania, Italy.

== Medalists ==
Gold	Silver	Bronze
Ekaterini Thanou; Greece	Anzhela Kravchenko; Ukraine	Katia Benth; France

== Results ==
=== Heats ===
Wind:
Heat 2: -1.7 m/s, Heat 3: +0.6 m/s

Rank	Heat	Name	Nationality	Time	Notes
1	1	Melinda Sergent	United States	11.54	Q
2	1	Amara Ezem-Wallace	Nigeria	11.98	Q
2	1	Natalya Ignatova	Russia	11.98	Q
4	1	Rose Abo	Nigeria	12.10	Q
5	1	Chen Shu-chen	Chinese Taipei	12.24	Q
6	1	Lucy Nyadenga	Zimbabwe	13.24	
7	1	Adriana Lewis	Peru	13.50	
1	2	Tara Perry	Canada	11.78	Q
2	2	Agnė Visockaitė	Lithuania	11.94	Q
3	2	Wan Kin Yee	Hong Kong	12.10	Q
4	2	Rutti Luksepp	Estonia	12.24	Q
5	2	Elena Sordelli	Italy	12.30	Q
1	3	Ekaterini Thanou	Greece	11.23	Q
2	3	Natallia Safronnikava	Belarus	11.71	Q
3	3	Olga Povtaryova	Russia	11.85	Q
4	3	Mireille Donders	Switzerland	11.89	Q
5	3	Annemarie Kramer	Netherlands	11.96	Q
6	3	Adriana Francisco	Brazil	12.09	q
1	4	Anzhela Kravchenko	Ukraine	11.75	Q
2	4	Karen Clarke	Canada	11.86	Q
3	4	Marit Nyberg-Birknes	Norway	11.92	Q
4	4	Sarah Oxley	Great Britain	11.98	Q
5	4	Anna Smythe	New Zealand	12.08	Q
1	5	Katia Benth	France	11.64	Q
2	5	Kim Gevaert	Belgium	11.94	Q
3	5	Rahela Markt	Croatia	11.98	Q
4	5	Manuela Grillo	Italy	12.08	Q
5	5	Lena Barry	Ireland	12.15	Q
6	5	Lorena de Oliveira	Brazil	12.31	
7	5	Seynabou N'Diaye	Senegal	12.62	
1	6	Passion Richardson	United States	11.87	Q
2	6	Mia Prinsloo	South Africa	11.96	Q
3	6	Monika Gachevska	Bulgaria	12.05	Q
4	6	Mónica Castro	Chile	12.35	Q
5	6	Veronica Wabukawo	Uganda	12.35	Q
	6	Zannatun Nessa	Bangladesh	DNF	

=== Quarterfinals ===
Wind:
Heat 1: ? m/s, Heat 2: +0.4 m/s, Heat 3: ? m/s, Heat 4: -1.1 m/s

Rank	Heat	Name	Nationality	Time	Notes
1	1	Tara Perry	Canada	11.59	Q
2	1	Anzhela Kravchenko	Ukraine	11.60	Q
3	1	Sarah Oxley	Great Britain	11.81	Q
4	1	Marit Nyberg-Birknes	Norway	11.81	Q
5	1	Amara Ezem-Wallace	Nigeria	11.85	
5	1	Natalya Ignatova	Russia	11.85	
7	1	Manuela Grillo	Italy	11.99	
8	1	Lena Barry	Ireland	12.07	
1	2	Ekaterini Thanou	Greece	11.25	Q
2	2	Agnė Visockaitė	Lithuania	11.71	Q
3	2	Karen Clarke	Canada	11.80	Q
4	2	Rose Abo	Nigeria	11.90	Q
5	2	Veronica Wabukawo	Uganda	12.30	
6	2	Mónica Castro	Chile	12.35	
1	3	Katia Benth	France	11.57	Q
2	3	Mireille Donders	Switzerland	11.78	Q
3	3	Passion Richardson	United States	11.87	Q
4	3	Olga Povtaryova	Russia	12.03	Q
5	3	Mia Prinsloo	South Africa	12.04	
6	3	Chen Shu-chen	Chinese Taipei	12.04	
7	3	Adriana Francisco	Brazil	12.12	
1	4	Melinda Sergent	United States	11.45	Q
2	4	Natallia Safronnikava	Belarus	11.74	Q
3	4	Kim Gevaert	Belgium	11.83	Q
4	4	Rahela Markt	Croatia	11.85	Q
5	4	Anna Smythe	New Zealand	12.01	
6	4	Rutti Luksepp	Estonia	12.02	
7	4	Wan Kin Yee	Hong Kong	12.03	

=== Semifinals ===
Wind:
Heat 1: +1.3 m/s, Heat 2: +2.4 m/s

Rank	Heat	Name	Nationality	Time	Notes
1	1	Ekaterini Thanou	Greece	11.22	Q
2	1	Anzhela Kravchenko	Ukraine	11.39	Q
3	1	Tara Perry	Canada	11.60	Q
4	1	Mireille Donders	Switzerland	11.68	Q
?	1	Marit Nyberg-Birknes	Norway	11.87	
?	1	Olga Povtaryova	Russia	11.89	
1	2	Melinda Sergent	United States	11.30	Q
2	2	Katia Benth	France	11.30	Q
3	2	Agnė Visockaitė	Lithuania	11.53	Q
4	2	Karen Clarke	Canada	11.65	Q
5	2	Kim Gevaert	Belgium	11.66	
6	2	Rahela Markt	Croatia	11.68	
7	2	Natallia Safronnikava	Belarus	11.69	

=== Final ===
Wind: +1.5 m/s

Rank	Athlete	Nationality	Time	Notes
1st place, gold medalist(s)	Ekaterini Thanou	Greece	11.20	
2nd place, silver medalist(s)	Anzhela Kravchenko	Ukraine	11.34	
3rd place, bronze medalist(s)	Katia Benth	France	11.35	
4	Tara Perry	Canada	11.47	
5	Agnė Visockaitė	Lithuania	11.53	
6	Melinda Sergent	United States	11.57	
7	Mireille Donders	Switzerland	11.65	
8	Karen Clarke	Canada	11.80	
