= Athletics at the 1997 Summer Universiade – Women's 200 metres =

The women's 200 metres event at the 1997 Summer Universiade was held on 26 and 27 August at the Stadio Cibali in Catania, Italy.

== Medalists ==
Gold	Silver	Bronze
Yekaterina Leshcheva; Russia	Katia Benth; France	Monika Gachevska; Bulgaria

== Results ==
=== Heats ===
Wind:
Heat 1: +1.2 m/s, Heat 2: +1.5 m/s, Heat 3: -1.2 m/s, Heat 4: +0.8 m/s, Heat 5: ? m/s, Heat 6: ? m/s

Rank	Heat	Athlete	Nationality	Time	Notes
1	1	Mireille Donders	Switzerland	23.31	Q
2	1	Natallia Safronnikava	Belarus	23.73	Q
3	1	LaDonna Antoine	Canada	23.94	Q
4	1	Ameerah Bello	United States Virgin Islands	23.96	Q
5	1	Michelle Thomas	Great Britain	23.98	q
6	1	Wan Kin Yee	Hong Kong	24.30	q
7	1	Chen Shu-chen	Chinese Taipei	24.49	
8	1	Adriana Francisco	Brazil	24.58	
1	2	Anke Feller	Germany	23.76	Q
2	2	Kim Gevaert	Belgium	23.92	Q
3	2	LaTasha Jenkins	United States	24.12	Q
4	2	Olivia Haddon	New Zealand	25.97	Q
1	3	Katia Benth	France	23.51	Q
2	3	Svetlana Goncharenko	Russia	23.84	Q
3	3	Sarah Oxley	Great Britain	23.89	Q
4	3	Mia Prinsloo	South Africa	24.28	Q
5	3	Rose Abo	Nigeria	24.49	q
6	3	Rahela Markt	Croatia	24.67	
7	3	Jane Arnott	New Zealand	24.78	
8	3	Andrea Pinnock	Canada	25.21	
1	4	Yekaterina Leshcheva	Russia	23.29	Q
2	4	Elona Reinalda	Australia	24.16	Q
3	4	Elena Apollonio	Italy	24.42	Q
4	4	Biljana Mitrović	Yugoslavia	24.54	Q
5	4	Rutti Luksepp	Estonia	24.80	
5	4	Veronica Wabukawo	Uganda	25.45	
6	4	Lisbeth Nielsen	Denmark	26.50	
1	5	Monika Gachevska	Bulgaria	23.74	Q
2	5	Kelli White	United States	24.10	Q
3	5	Shanta Ghosh	Germany	24.23	Q
4	5	Lorena de Oliveira	Brazil	24.65	Q
5	5	Seynabou N'Diaye	Senegal	25.58	
6	5	Lucy Nyadenga	Zimbabwe	26.42	
	5	Olajide Olusola	Nigeria	DQ	
1	6	Annemarie Kramer	Netherlands	24.12	q
2	6	Irene Daniele	Italy	24.60	
3	6	Lena Barry	Ireland	24.66	

=== Quarterfinals ===
Wind:
Heat 1: +1.0 m/s, Heat 2: ? m/s, Heat 3: +0.8 m/s

Rank	Heat	Athlete	Nationality	Time	Notes
1	3	Yekaterina Leshcheva	Russia	23.13	Q
2	1	Katia Benth	France	23.36	Q
3	2	Mireille Donders	Switzerland	23.46	Q
4	3	LaDonna Antoine	Canada	23.50	Q
5	2	Sarah Oxley	Great Britain	23.55	Q
6	1	Monika Gachevska	Bulgaria	23.57	Q
7	1	Elona Reinalda	Australia	23.60	Q
8	2	Anke Feller	Germany	23.61	Q
9	1	Shanta Ghosh	Germany	23.75	Q
10	3	Natallia Safronnikava	Belarus	23.83	Q
11	2	Svetlana Goncharenko	Russia	23.90	Q
12	3	Kim Gevaert	Belgium	23.95	Q
13	1	Ameerah Bello	United States Virgin Islands	23.97	q
13	1	Annemarie Kramer	Netherlands	23.97	q
15	1	Michelle Thomas	Great Britain	24.02	q
16	2	Elena Apollonio	Italy	24.15	q
17	2	Mia Prinsloo	South Africa	24.17	
18	3	LaTasha Jenkins	United States	24.20	
19	3	Lorena de Oliveira	Brazil	24.41	
20	3	Biljana Mitrović	Yugoslavia	24.42	
21	3	Rose Abo	Nigeria	24.53	
22	2	Wan Kin Yee	Hong Kong	24.54	
23	2	Olivia Haddon	New Zealand	26.03	
	1	Kelli White	United States	?	

=== Semifinals ===
Wind:
Heat 1: -0.9 m/s, Heat 2: -0.6 m/s

Rank	Heat	Athlete	Nationality	Time	Notes
1	1	Yekaterina Leshcheva	Russia	23.23	Q
2	2	Katia Benth	France	23.26	Q
3	2	Monika Gachevska	Bulgaria	23.37	Q
4	2	Mireille Donders	Switzerland	23.53	Q
5	1	Anke Feller	Germany	23.62	Q
6	1	Sarah Oxley	Great Britain	23.70	Q
7	2	Elona Reinalda	Australia	23.74	Q
8	1	LaDonna Antoine	Canada	23.76	Q
9	2	Shanta Ghosh	Germany	23.84	
10	1	Natallia Safronnikava	Belarus	23.86	
11	1	Kim Gevaert	Belgium	24.03	
12	2	Annemarie Kramer	Netherlands	24.06	
13	2	Svetlana Goncharenko	Russia	24.09	
14	1	Ameerah Bello	United States Virgin Islands	24.12	
15	1	Elena Apollonio	Italy	24.13	
16	2	Michelle Thomas	Great Britain	24.23	

=== Final ===
Wind: -0.6 m/s

Rank	Athlete	Nationality	Time	Notes
1st place, gold medalist(s)	Yekaterina Leshcheva	Russia	23.18	
2nd place, silver medalist(s)	Katia Benth	France	23.31	
3rd place, bronze medalist(s)	Monika Gachevska	Bulgaria	23.60	
4	Anke Feller	Germany	23.61	
5	Sarah Oxley	Great Britain	23.66	
6	LaDonna Antoine	Canada	23.73	
7	Mireille Donders	Switzerland	23.74	
8	Elona Reinalda	Australia	24.31	
