= Athletics at the 1999 Summer Universiade – Women's 100 metres =

The women's 100 metres event at the 1999 Summer Universiade was held on 10 and 11 July at the Estadio Son Moix in Palma de Mallorca, Spain.

== Medalists ==
Gold	Silver	Bronze
Angela Williams; United States	Katia Benth; France	Virgen Benavides; Cuba

== Results ==
=== Heats ===
Wind:
Heat 1: -1.6 m/s, Heat 2: -1.2 m/s, Heat 3: -1.2 m/s, Heat 4: -1.8 m/s, Heat 5: -2.0 m/s

Rank	Heat	Athlete	Nationality	Time	Notes
1	4	Katia Benth	France	11.49	Q
2	4	Virgen Benavides	Cuba	11.50	Q
3	1	Aminata Diouf	Senegal	11.65	Q
3	3	Kim Gevaert	Belgium	11.65	Q
5	2	Rahela Markt	Croatia	11.67	Q, SB
6	3	Shanta Gosh	Germany	11.73	Q
7	2	Yelena Anisimova	Russia	11.78	Q
8	5	Torri Edwards	United States	11.82	Q
9	2	Annika Amundin	Sweden	11.86	Q
10	4	Manuela Grillo	Italy	11.88	Q
11	1	Angela Williams	United States	11.89	Q
12	1	Esi Benyarku	Canada	11.95	Q
12	1	Elena Sordelli	Italy	11.95	Q
14	4	Katleen De Caluwé	Belgium	11.96	Q
15	2	Lisette Rondón	Chile	11.97	Q, SB
16	5	Mireille Donders	Switzerland	12.01	Q
17	1	Wan Kin Yee	Hong Kong	12.03	q
17	3	Carmen Blay	Spain	12.03	Q
19	4	Marit Nyberg Birknes	Norway	12.04	q
20	4	Arantxa Iglesias	Spain	12.05	q
20	5	Ann Helen Rinden	Norway	12.05	Q
22	5	Abiodun Oyepitan	Great Britain	12.06	Q
23	1	Yuliya Vertyanova	Russia	12.10	q
24	3	Yessica Torres	Mexico	12.19	Q
25	5	Suzaan Louwrens	South Africa	12.19	
26	3	Gloria Kemasuode	Nigeria	12.22	
27	2	Anais Oyembo	Gabon	12.24	
28	2	Juliet Tajiri	Uganda	12.38	
29	2	Seynabou Ndiaye	Senegal	12.41	
30	5	Nancy Castillo	Mexico	12.56	
31	3	Maritza Figueroa	Nicaragua	12.57	
32	4	Adriana Lewis	Peru	12.62	
33	5	Yemi Ogunbanwo	Nigeria	12.66	
34	5	Zuleyka Almodovar	Puerto Rico	12.78	
35	2	Monika Gachevska	Bulgaria	12.87	
36	4	Diana Fournouzlian	Lebanon	13.20	
37	1	Christine Sciberras	Malta	13.42	
38	1	Dinh Thi Thuy	Vietnam	13.97	
	3	Denia Barton	Costa Rica	DNS	
	3	Sazie Nicolas	France	DNS	

=== Quarterfinals ===
Wind:
Heat 1: -0.1 m/s, Heat 2: +0.1 m/s, Heat 3: +0.3 m/s

Rank	Heat	Athlete	Nationality	Time	Notes
1	2	Virgen Benavides	Cuba	11.29	Q
2	2	Katia Benth	France	11.35	Q
3	3	Aminata Diouf	Senegal	11.39	Q
4	3	Angela Williams	United States	11.44	Q
5	1	Kim Gevaert	Belgium	11.51	Q
6	2	Shanta Gosh	Germany	11.56	Q
7	1	Torri Edwards	United States	11.57	Q
8	1	Manuela Grillo	Italy	11.73	Q, SB
9	2	Abiodun Oyepitan	Great Britain	11.74	Q
9	2	Annika Amundin	Sweden	11.74	q
9	3	Mireille Donders	Switzerland	11.74	Q
12	1	Yelena Anisimova	Russia	11.75	Q
13	3	Rahela Markt	Croatia	11.77	Q
14	3	Katleen De Caluwé	Belgium	11.79	q
15	2	Elena Sordelli	Italy	11.83	q
16	1	Arantxa Iglesias	Spain	11.86	
16	2	Esi Benyarku	Canada	11.86	q
18	1	Ann Helen Rinden	Norway	11.92	
18	3	Marit Nyberg Birknes	Norway	11.92	
20	3	Wan Kin Yee	Hong Kong	11.97	
21	3	Carmen Blay	Spain	11.98	
22	1	Lisette Rondón	Chile	12.00	
23	1	Yessica Torres	Mexico	12.11	
24	2	Yuliya Vertyanova	Russia	12.18	

=== Semifinals ===
Wind:
Heat 1: -0.9 m/s, Heat 2: +0.5 m/s

Rank	Heat	Athlete	Nationality	Time	Notes
1	2	Katia Benth	France	11.27	Q, SB
2	2	Virgen Benavides	Cuba	11.32	Q
3	2	Angela Williams	United States	11.35	Q
4	1	Aminata Diouf	Senegal	11.41	Q
5	1	Kim Gevaert	Belgium	11.44	Q
6	1	Torri Edwards	United States	11.45	Q
7	1	Shanta Gosh	Germany	11.59	Q
8	2	Mireille Donders	Switzerland	11.61	Q
9	2	Manuela Grillo	Italy	11.71	SB
10	1	Yelena Anisimova	Russia	11.73	
11	1	Annika Amundin	Sweden	11.77	
11	2	Katleen De Caluwé	Belgium	11.77	
13	1	Abiodun Oyepitan	Great Britain	11.81	
14	1	Elena Sordelli	Italy	11.92	
15	2	Esi Benyarku	Canada	11.93	
16	2	Rahela Markt	Croatia	11.94	

=== Final ===
Rank	Athlete	Nationality	Time	Notes
1st place, gold medalist(s)	Angela Williams	United States	11.19	
2nd place, silver medalist(s)	Katia Benth	France	11.23	
3rd place, bronze medalist(s)	Virgen Benavides	Cuba	11.25	
4	Kim Gevaert	Belgium	11.32	
5	Torri Edwards	United States	11.34	
6	Aminata Diouf	Senegal	11.37	
7	Mireille Donders	Switzerland	11.55	
8	Shanta Gosh	Germany	11.60	
