= Athletics at the 2001 Summer Universiade – Women's 100 metres =

The women's 100 metres event at the 2001 Summer Universiade was held at the Workers Stadium in Beijing, China. The final took place on 27 and 28 August.

== Medalists ==
Gold	Silver	Bronze
Abiodun Oyepitan; Great Britain	Zeng Xiujun; China	Mireille Donders; Switzerland

== Results ==
=== Heats ===
Wind:
Heat 1: 0.0 m/s, Heat 2: 0.0 m/s, Heat 3: +1.3 m/s, Heat 4: +1.3 m/s, Heat 5: +1.7 m/s

Rank	Heat	Athlete	Nationality	Time	Notes
1	4	Abiodun Oyepitan	Great Britain	11.31	Q
2	5	Chen Yueqin	China	11.38	Q
3	5	Amanda Forrester	Great Britain	11.40	Q
4	2	Mireille Donders	Switzerland	11.48	Q
5	3	Katia Benth	France	11.49	Q
6	4	Zeng Xiujun	China	11.50	Q
7	2	Lucimar Moura	Brazil	11.57	Q
7	3	Teneeshia Jones	United States	11.57	Q
7	5	Rosemar Coelho Neto	Brazil	11.57	Q
10	2	Jacqueline Poelman	Netherlands	11.59	Q
11	5	Natalya Mikhaylovskaya	Russia	11.62	Q
12	5	Céline Thelamon	France	11.63	q
13	4	Katleen De Caluwé	Belgium	11.64	Q
14	4	Francesca Cola	Italy	11.67	Q
15	3	Alice Reuss	Germany	11.73	Q
16	1	Caro Hunt	New Zealand	11.77	Q
16	5	Viktoriya Koviyreva	Kazakhstan	11.77	q
18	2	Tonya Carter	United States	11.85	Q
19	1	Ruth Grajeda	Mexico	11.87	Q
20	4	Mariya Enkina	Russia	11.92	q
21	1	Manuela Grillo	Italy	11.96	Q
22	5	Amorette Bradshaw	Canada	11.97	q
23	5	Ilze Jordaan	South Africa	12.04	
24	4	Nathalie Saikaly	Lebanon	12.48	
25	4	Julia Krasnova	Estonia	12.52	
26	3	Lina Bejjani	Lebanon	12.55	Q
27	3	Adriana Lewis	Peru	12.69	
28	1	Houria Moussa	Algeria	12.89	Q
29	2	Candyss Odle	Guyana	13.13	
30	3	Diane Noa	Tonga	13.54	
31	2	K. Matsebula	Swaziland	13.75	
32	2	Hamadi Nadhufa	Comoros	13.81	
33	1	Hermine Eigairma	Rwanda	14.35	
34	4	Yolani Manuel	Federated States of Micronesia	14.75	
35	1	Marcelline Tolno	Guinea	18.26	

=== Quarterfinals ===
Wind:
Heat 1: ? m/s, Heat 2: -1.5 m/s, Heat 3: -1.4 m/s

Rank	Heat	Athlete	Nationality	Time	Notes
1	3	Abiodun Oyepitan	Great Britain	11.47	Q
2	2	Zeng Xiujun	China	11.57	Q
3	1	Mireille Donders	Switzerland	11.61	Q
4	3	Chen Yueqin	China	11.62	Q
5	2	Lucimar Moura	Brazil	11.64	Q
6	2	Jacqueline Poelman	Netherlands	11.65	Q
6	2	Amanda Forrester	Great Britain	11.65	Q
8	1	Katia Benth	France	11.67	Q
9	2	Katleen De Caluwé	Belgium	11.75	q
10	3	Rosemar Coelho Neto	Brazil	11.79	Q
11	2	Céline Thelamon	France	11.80	q
12	1	Teneeshia Jones	United States	11.83	Q
12	3	Francesca Cola	Italy	11.83	Q
14	1	Natalya Mikhaylovskaya	Russia	11.87	Q
14	3	Alice Reuss	Germany	11.87	q
14	3	Caro Hunt	New Zealand	11.87	q
17	1	Ruth Grajeda	Mexico	11.89	
18	1	Viktoriya Koviyreva	Kazakhstan	11.94	
19	3	Mariya Enkina	Russia	12.00	
20	1	Manuela Grillo	Italy	12.03	
20	2	Tonya Carter	United States	12.03	
22	2	Amorette Bradshaw	Canada	12.31	
23	1	Lina Bejjani	Lebanon	12.70	
24	3	Houria Moussa	Algeria	13.05	

=== Semifinals ===
Wind:
Heat 1: -0.3 m/s, Heat 2: 0.0 m/s

Rank	Heat	Athlete	Nationality	Time	Notes
1	2	Abiodun Oyepitan	Great Britain	11.29	Q
2	1	Zeng Xiujun	China	11.45	Q
3	1	Mireille Donders	Switzerland	11.47	Q
4	1	Jacqueline Poelman	Netherlands	11.50	Q
5	2	Katia Benth	France	11.59	Q
6	1	Amanda Forrester	Great Britain	11.61	Q
7	2	Chen Yueqin	China	11.62	Q
8	2	Lucimar Moura	Brazil	11.65	Q
9	1	Rosemar Coelho Neto	Brazil	11.69	
10	1	Francesca Cola	Italy	11.74	
11	1	Alice Reuss	Germany	11.76	
12	2	Katleen De Caluwé	Belgium	11.77	
12	1	Céline Thelamon	France	11.77	
14	2	Natalya Mikhaylovskaya	Russia	11.83	
15	2	Teneeshia Jones	United States	11.84	
16	2	Caro Hunt	New Zealand	11.87	

=== Final ===
Wind : +1.1 m/s

Rank	Athlete	Nationality	Time	Notes
1st place, gold medalist(s)	Abiodun Oyepitan	Great Britain	11.42	
2nd place, silver medalist(s)	Zeng Xiujun	China	11.58	
3rd place, bronze medalist(s)	Mireille Donders	Switzerland	11.59	
4	Lucimar Moura	Brazil	11.62	
5	Jacqueline Poelman	Netherlands	11.62	
6	Katia Benth	France	11.72	
7	Chen Yueqin	China	11.77	
8	Amanda Forrester	Great Britain	11.77	
