= Athletics at the 1999 Summer Universiade – Women's 200 metres =

The women's 200 metres event at the 1999 Summer Universiade was held on 8, 9 and 10 July at the Estadio Son Moix in Palma de Mallorca, Spain.

== Medalists ==
Gold	Silver	Bronze
Kim Gevaert; Belgium	Zuzanna Radecka; Poland	Nanceen Perry; United States

== Results ==
=== Heats ===
Wind:
Heat 1: -2.0 m/s, Heat 2: -3.5 m/s, Heat 3: -2.1 m/s, Heat 4: ? m/s, Heat 5: -1.6 m/s, Heat 6: +0.5 m/s

Rank	Heat	Athlete	Nationality	Time	Notes
1	1	Fabienne Feraez	France	23.80	Q
2	1	Shani Anderson	Great Britain	23.84	Q
3	1	Fabé Dia	France	23.90	Q
4	1	Rahela Markt	Croatia	24.28	Q
5	1	Elena Córcoles	Spain	24.66	q
6	1	Anita Sutherland	New Zealand	25.17	q
7	1	Vickie Nakibuka	Uganda	27.59	
1	2	Julia Alba	Spain	24.20	Q
2	2	Andrea Bornscheuer	Germany	24.28	Q
3	2	Francesca Cola	Italy	24.30	Q
4	2	Lisette Rondón	Chile	24.62	Q
5	2	Juliet Tajiri	Uganda	26.02	
6	2	Monika Gachevska	Bulgaria	26.76	
7	2	Morzina Musammat	Bangladesh	31.80	
1	3	Kim Gevaert	Belgium	23.68	Q
2	3	Zuzanna Radecka	Poland	23.98	Q
3	3	Mireille Donders	Switzerland	24.04	Q
4	3	Katleen De Caluwé	Belgium	24.33	Q
5	3	Melanie Purkiss	Great Britain	24.33	q
6	3	Natalie O'Hara	Australia	25.04	
7	3	Maritza Figueroa	Nicaragua	25.82	q
	3	Theresa Okang	Cameroon	DQ	R141.2
1	4	Aminata Diouf	Senegal	NM	Q
2	4	Yelena Anisimova	Russia	NM	Q
3	4	Daniela Graglia	Italy	NM	Q
4	4	Marcela Sarabia	Mexico	NM	Q
5	4	Denia Barton	Costa Rica	NM	q
6	4	Rossana Rodríguez	Guatemala	NM	q
	4	Seynabou Ndiaye	Senegal	?	
1	5	Sigvor Melve	Norway	24.05	Q
2	5	LaKeisha Backus	United States	23.47	Q
3	5	Nicole Marahrens	Germany	24.29	Q
4	5	Charlene Lawrence	South Africa	24.39	Q
5	5	Fabiola Reyes	Mexico	25.87	q
	5	Rutti Luksepp	Estonia	DNF	
	5	Adriana Lewis	Peru	DNS	
1	6	Nanceen Perry	United States	23.35	Q
2	6	Tanya Oxley	Barbados	23.81	Q
3	6	Marina Vasarmidou	Greece	24.04	Q
4	6	Ann Helen Rinden	Norway	24.04	Q
5	6	Wan Kin Yee	Hong Kong	24.13	q
6	6	Yemi Ogunbanwo	Nigeria	25.51	q
	6	Rita Sulialiskaite	Lithuania	DNS	

=== Quarterfinals ===
Wind:
Heat 1: +0.2 m/s, Heat 2: +0.6 m/s, Heat 3: +2.3 m/s, Heat 4: +1.6 m/s, Heat 5: +1.5 m/s

Rank	Heat	Athlete	Nationality	Time	Notes
1	1	Nanceen Perry	United States	23.17	Q
2	2	Kim Gevaert	Belgium	23.27	Q
3	5	Aminata Diouf	Senegal	23.28	Q
4	3	Fabienne Feraez	France	23.33	Q
5	1	Zuzanna Radecka	Poland	23.42	Q
6	2	LaKeisha Backus	United States	23.47	Q
7	3	Shani Anderson	Great Britain	23.33	Q
8	5	Mireille Donders	Switzerland	23.56	Q
9	4	Fabé Dia	France	23.61	Q
10	4	Tanya Oxley	Barbados	23.67	Q
11	5	Nicole Marahrens	Germany	23.70	q
12	5	Julia Alba	Spain	23.76	q
13	2	Yelena Anisimova	Russia	23.85	q
14	3	Marina Vasarmidou	Greece	23.90	q
15	4	Sigvor Melve	Norway	23.91	q
16	1	Katleen De Caluwé	Belgium	23.95	q
17	1	Andrea Bornscheuer	Germany	23.95	
18	2	Melanie Purkiss	Great Britain	24.00	
19	4	Francesca Cola	Italy	24.05	
20	2	Ann Helen Rinden	Norway	24.17	
21	3	Daniela Graglia	Italy	24.19	
22	4	Wan Kin Yee	Hong Kong	24.20	
23	3	Lisette Rondón	Chile	24.38	
24	3	Elena Córcoles	Spain	24.43	
25	4	Marcela Sarabia	Mexico	24.69	
26	1	Natalie O'Hara	Australia	24.90	
27	1	Anita Sutherland	New Zealand	25.06	
28	4	Maritza Figueroa	Nicaragua	25.35	
29	2	Yemi Ogunbanwo	Nigeria	25.53	
30	5	Rossana Rodríguez	Guatemala	27.28	
31	5	Denia Barton	Costa Rica	27.36	
	1	Rahela Markt	Croatia	DQ	R141.2
	2	Charlene Lawrence	South Africa	DNF	
	3	Fabiola Reyes	Mexico	DNS	

=== Semifinals ===
Wind:
Heat 1: -1.3 m/s, Heat 2: -1.0 m/s

Rank	Heat	Athlete	Nationality	Time	Notes
1	1	Nanceen Perry	United States	23.09	Q
2	1	Zuzanna Radecka	Poland	23.17	Q
3	1	Fabienne Feraez	France	23.19	Q
4	2	Kim Gevaert	Belgium	23.23	Q
5	2	Aminata Diouf	Senegal	23.24	Q
6	2	LaKeisha Backus	United States	23.38	Q
7	1	Mireille Donders	Switzerland	23.44	Q
8	2	Fabé Dia	France	23.52	Q
9	1	Yelena Anisimova	Russia	23.54	
10	1	Shani Anderson	Great Britain	23.76	
11	1	Julia Alba	Spain	23.84	
12	2	Sigvor Melve	Norway	23.90	
13	2	Nicole Marahrens	Germany	24.03	
14	1	Katleen De Caluwé	Belgium	24.06	
15	2	Marina Vasarmidou	Greece	24.09	
16	2	Tanya Oxley	Barbados	24.12	

=== Final ===
Wind: -1.1 m/s

Rank	Athlete	Nationality	Time	Notes
1st place, gold medalist(s)	Kim Gevaert	Belgium	23.10	
2nd place, silver medalist(s)	Zuzanna Radecka	Poland	23.14	
3rd place, bronze medalist(s)	Nanceen Perry	United States	23.27	
4	Aminata Diouf	Senegal	23.37	
5	Fabienne Feraez	France	23.45	
6	LaKeisha Backus	United States	23.57	
7	Mireille Donders	Switzerland	23.83	
8	Fabé Dia	France	24.04	
