= Athletics at the 2001 Summer Universiade – Women's 200 metres =

The women's 200 metres event at the 2001 Summer Universiade was held at the Workers Stadium in Beijing, China on 30–31 August.

== Medalists ==
Gold	Silver	Bronze
Li Xuemei; China	Kim Gevaert; Belgium	Natallia Safronnikava; Belarus

== Results ==
=== Heats ===
Wind:
Heat 1: ? m/s, Heat 2: +2.2 m/s, Heat 3: +1.1 m/s, Heat 4: +1.5 m/s, Heat 5: ? m/s

Rank	Heat	Athlete	Nationality	Time	Notes
1	4	Li Xuemei	China	23.21	Q
2	4	Kim Gevaert	Belgium	23.35	Q
3	4	Jacqueline Poelman	Netherlands	23.36	Q
4	5	Mireille Donders	Switzerland	23.37	Q
5	2	Shanta Ghosh	Germany	23.48	Q
6	2	Yan Jiankui	China	23.50	Q
7	3	Natallia Safronnikava	Belarus	23.60	Q
7	5	Mary Onyemuwa	Nigeria	23.60	Q
9	2	Rosemar Coelho Neto	Brazil	23.72	Q
10	5	Nicole Marahrens	Germany	23.75	Q
11	4	Tania Woods	United States	23.81	Q
12	3	Katleen De Caluwé	Belgium	23.82	Q
13	1	Caro Hunt	New Zealand	23.84	Q
14	2	Aminata Diouf	Senegal	23.92	Q
15	1	Lucimar Moura	Brazil	24.08	Q
16	3	Jimyria Hicks	United States	24.08	Q
17	5	Rebecca Wardell	New Zealand	24.09	Q
18	3	Mariya Enkina	Russia	24.12	Q
18	4	Viktoriya Kovyreva	Kazakhstan	24.12	q
20	2	Susan Burnside-Deacon	Great Britain	24.15	q
21	3	Helen Roscoe	Great Britain	24.30	q
22	5	Žana Minina	Lithuania	24.32	q
23	1	Ruth Grajeda	Mexico	24.37	Q
24	1	Carole Kaboud Mebam	Cameroon	24.49	Q
25	5	Mary Apio	Uganda	24.58	
26	3	Judith Baarssen	Netherlands	24.69	
27	5	Amorette Bradshaw	Canada	24.73	
28	1	Christina Schnohr	Denmark	24.80	
29	4	Pauline Ibeagha	Nigeria	24.95	
30	4	Anne Mooney	Papua New Guinea	25.31	
31	3	Ilze Jordaan	South Africa	25.41	
32	1	Vasiti Vatureba	Fiji	25.63	
33	2	Lina Bejjani	Lebanon	25.68	
34	5	Nathalie Saikaly	Lebanon	25.75	
35	1	Eleana Leung	Hong Kong	26.19	
36	2	Adriana Lewis	Peru	26.79	
37	3	K. Matsebula	Swaziland	28.74	
38	4	Mwawi Mkandawire	Malawi	29.39	

=== Quarterfinals ===
Wind:
Heat 1: 0.0 m/s, Heat 2: -0.4 m/s, Heat 3: +0.9 m/s

Rank	Heat	Athlete	Nationality	Time	Notes
1	1	Kim Gevaert	Belgium	23.27	Q
2	3	Natallia Safronnikava	Belarus	23.33	Q
3	1	Li Xuemei	China	23.38	Q
4	3	Shanta Ghosh	Germany	23.39	Q
5	2	Mireille Donders	Switzerland	23.43	Q
6	2	Yan Jiankui	China	23.51	Q
7	2	Mary Onyemuwa	Nigeria	23.53	Q
8	3	Lucimar Moura	Brazil	23.54	Q
9	3	Tania Woods	United States	23.57	Q
10	1	Jacqueline Poelman	Netherlands	23.60	Q
11	1	Rosemar Coelho Neto	Brazil	23.81	Q
12	1	Nicole Marahrens	Germany	23.85	q
13	3	Katleen De Caluwé	Belgium	23.86	q
14	3	Ruth Grajeda	Mexico	24.01	q
15	2	Aminata Diouf	Senegal	24.03	Q
16	3	Viktoriya Kovyreva	Kazakhstan	24.10	q
17	1	Mariya Enkina	Russia	24.12	
18	2	Jimyria Hicks	United States	24.15	
19	2	Caro Hunt	New Zealand	24.16	
20	3	Susan Burnside-Deacon	Great Britain	24.42	
21	1	Rebecca Wardell	New Zealand	24.43	
22	2	Helen Roscoe	Great Britain	24.55	
23	2	Carole Kaboud Mebam	Cameroon	24.91	
	1	Žana Minina	Lithuania	DNF	

=== Semifinals ===
Wind:
Heat 1: +2.0 m/s, Heat 2: +0.7 m/s

Rank	Heat	Athlete	Nationality	Time	Notes
1	1	Li Xuemei	China	22.76	Q
2	1	Kim Gevaert	Belgium	23.00	Q
3	1	Mireille Donders	Switzerland	23.13	Q
4	2	Jacqueline Poelman	Netherlands	23.20	Q
5	2	Natallia Safronnikava	Belarus	23.27	Q
6	2	Tania Woods	United States	23.34	Q
7	1	Mary Onyemuwa	Nigeria	23.35	Q
8	2	Yan Jiankui	China	23.41	Q
9	2	Nicole Marahrens	Germany	23.48	
10	1	Shanta Ghosh	Germany	23.55	
11	1	Aminata Diouf	Senegal	24.02	
12	1	Viktoriya Kovyreva	Kazakhstan	24.09	
13	2	Lucimar Moura	Brazil	24.16	
14	2	Katleen De Caluwé	Belgium	24.17	
15	2	Ruth Grajeda	Mexico	24.24	
	1	Rosemar Coelho Neto	Brazil	DNF	

=== Final ===
Wind: +0.5

Rank	Athlete	Nationality	Time	Notes
1st place, gold medalist(s)	Li Xuemei	China	22.86	
2nd place, silver medalist(s)	Kim Gevaert	Belgium	22.94	
3rd place, bronze medalist(s)	Natallia Safronnikava	Belarus	23.16	
4	Mireille Donders	Switzerland	23.31	
5	Mary Onyemuwa	Nigeria	23.49	
6	Jacqueline Poelman	Netherlands	23.58	
7	Tania Woods	United States	23.83	
8	Yan Jiankui	China	23.99	
