= Athletics at the 1999 Summer Universiade – Women's 4 × 100 metres relay =

The women's 4 × 100 metres relay event at the 1999 Summer Universiade was held on 12 and 13 July at the Estadio Son Moix in Palma de Mallorca, Spain.

== Results ==
=== Heats ===
Rank	Heat	Nation	Athletes	Time	Notes
1	2	Poland	Agnieszka Rysiukiewicz, Irena Sznajder, Monika Borejza, Zuzanna Radecka	43.46	Q
2	1	United States	Angela Williams, Torri Edwards, LaKeisha Backus, Nanceen Perry	43.49	Q
3	2	France	Natacha Casy, Fabienne Feraez, Fabé Dia, Katia Benth	43.64	Q
4	2	Germany	Shanta Gosh, Kirsten Bolm, Andrea Bornscheuer, Nicole Mahrarens	43.75	Q
5	1	Spain	Carme Blay, Elena Córcoles, Arantxa Iglesias, Julia Alba	44.48	Q
6	2	Great Britain	Abiodun Oyepitan, Melanie Purkiss, Diane Allahgreen, Shani Anderson	44.56	q
7	1	Italy	Elena Maria Apollonio, Elena Sordelli, Manuela Grillo, Daniela Graglia	44.65	Q
8	2	Puerto Rico	Zuleyka Almodovar, Militza Castro, Yesenia Rivera, Jennifer Caraballo	45.09	q
9	1	Mexico	Yessica Torres, Marcela Sarabia, Fabiola Reyes, Nancy Castillo	45.65	
10	1	Senegal	Faton Fall, Ndeye Niang, Seynabou Ndiaye, Aminata Diouf	47.21	
	2	Nigeria		DNS	

=== Final ===
Rank	Nation	Athletes	Time	Notes
1st place, gold medalist(s)	United States	Angela Williams, Torri Edwards, LaKeisha Backus, Nanceen Perry	43.49	
2nd place, silver medalist(s)	Poland	Agnieszka Rysiukiewicz, Irena Sznajder, Monika Borejza, Zuzanna Radecka	43.74	
3rd place, bronze medalist(s)	Germany	Shanta Gosh, Kirsten Bolm, Andrea Bornscheuer, Nicole Mahrarens	43.96	
4	France	Natacha Casy, Fabienne Feraez, Fabé Dia, Katia Benth	44.03	
5	Great Britain	Abiodun Oyepitan, Melanie Purkiss, Diane Allahgreen, Shani Anderson	44.71	
6	Italy	Elena Maria Apollonio, Elena Sordelli, Manuela Grillo, Daniela Graglia	44.80	
7	Puerto Rico	Zuleyka Almodovar, Militza Castro, Yesenia Rivera, Jennifer Caraballo	45.49	
8	Spain	Carme Blay, Elena Córcoles, Arantxa Iglesias, Julia Alba	45.95	
