= Bejjani =

Bejjani is a surname. Notable people with the surname include:

- Alain Bejjani, Lebanese business executive
- Lina Bejjani (born 1984), Lebanese sprinter
