= 1997 European Athletics U23 Championships – Women's 200 metres =

The women's 200 metres event at the 1997 European Athletics U23 Championships was held in Turku, Finland, on 12 and 13 July 1997.

== Medalists ==
Gold	Hana Benešová; Czech Republic
Silver	Shanta Ghosh; Germany
Bronze	Katia Benth; France

== Results ==
=== Final ===
13 July
Wind: 1.7 m/s

Rank	Name	Nationality	Time	Notes
1st place, gold medalist(s)	Hana Benešová	Czech Republic	22.57	PB
2nd place, silver medalist(s)	Shanta Ghosh	Germany	22.80	
3rd place, bronze medalist(s)	Katia Benth	France	23.19	
4	Annemarie Kramer	Netherlands	23.24	
5	Fabé Dia	France	23.29	
6	Tatyana Lukyanenko	Ukraine	23.31	
7	Olga Maksimova	Russia	23.87	
8	Natalya Sologub	Belarus	23.93	

=== Heats ===
12 July
Qualified: first 3 in each heat and 2 best to the Final

==== Heat 1 ====
Wind: 1.9 m/s

Rank	Name	Nationality	Time	Notes
1	Fabé Dia	France	23.70	Q
2	Tatyana Lukyanenko	Ukraine	23.78	Q
3	Annemarie Kramer	Netherlands	23.90	Q
4	Nancy Kette	Germany	24.13	
5	Yuliya Vertyanova	Russia	24.29	
6	Manuela Grillo	Italy	24.70	
7	Elena Corcoles	Spain	24.76	

==== Heat 2 ====
Wind: 1.9 m/s

Rank	Name	Nationality	Time	Notes
1	Shanta Ghosh	Germany	23.09	Q
2	Katia Benth	France	23.42	Q
3	Hana Benešová	Czech Republic	23.55	Q
4	Natalya Sologub	Belarus	23.82	q
5	Olga Maksimova	Russia	23.91	q
6	Elena Apollonio	Italy	24.00	
7	Vyara Georgieva	Bulgaria	24.10	
8	Kristina Lörincz	Hungary	24.44	

== Participation ==
According to an unofficial count, 15 athletes from 11 countries participated in the event.

- Belarus (1)
- Bulgaria (1)
- Czech Republic (1)
- France (2)
- Germany (2)
- Hungary (1)
- Italy (2)
- Netherlands (1)
- Russia (2)
- Spain (1)
- Ukraine (1)
