= 1997 World Championships in Athletics – Women's 200 metres =

These are the results of the women's 200 metres event at the 1997 World Championships in Athletics in Athens, Greece.

== Medalists ==
| Gold | Zhanna Pintusevich; Ukraine (UKR) |
| Silver | Susanthika Jayasinghe; Sri Lanka (SRI) |
| Bronze | Merlene Ottey; Jamaica (JAM) |

== Records ==
| World Record | Florence Griffith Joyner (USA) | 21.34 | Seoul, South Korea | 29 September 1988 |
| Championship Record | Silke Gladisch-Möller (GDR) | 21.74 | Rome, Italy | 3 September 1987 |

== Results ==
=== Heats ===
6 August

| Heat | Rank | Name | Result | Notes |
|---|---|---|---|---|
| 4 | 1 | Susanthika Jayasinghe (SRI) | 22.44 Q | AR |
| 7 | 1 | Li Xuemei (CHN) | 22.44 Q | =AR |
| 4 | 3 | Yekaterina Leshchova (RUS) | 22.47 Q | PB |
| 4 | 4 | Merlene Ottey (JAM) | 22.47 Q | |
| 6 | 5 | Inger Miller (USA) | 22.55 Q | |
| 4 | 6 | Sylviane Félix (FRA) | 22.71 Q | PB |
| 2 | 7 | Melinda Gainsford-Taylor (AUS) | 22.76 Q | |
| 7 | 7 | Hana Benešová (CZE) | 22.76 Q | |
| 7 | 9 | Chandra Sturrup (BAH) | 22.77 Q | SB |
| 7 | 10 | Alenka Bikar (SLO) | 22.81 Q | NR |
| 1 | 11 | Zhanna Pintusevich (UKR) | 22.85 Q | |
| 3 | 12 | Marie-Jose Perec (FRA) | 22.87 Q | |
| 2 | 13 | Merlene Frazer (JAM) | 22.91 Q | |
| 3 | 14 | Marina Trandenkova (RUS) | 22.94 Q | |
| 3 | 15 | Ekaterini Koffa (GRE) | 22.97 Q | |
| 1 | 16 | Zundra Feagin-Alexander (USA) | 22.99 Q | SB |
| 6 | 16 | Liu Xiaomei (CHN) | 22.99 Q | |
| 6 | 18 | Juliet Campbell (JAM) | 23.00 Q | |
| 4 | 19 | Petya Pendareva (BUL) | 23.02 q | |
| 6 | 20 | Lucrecia Jardim (POR) | 23.04 Q | SB |
| 5 | 21 | Juliet Cuthbert (JAM) | 23.08 Q | |
| 1 | 22 | Melanie Paschke (GER) | 23.10 Q | |
| 3 | 23 | Yan Jiankui (CHN) | 23.11 Q | SB |
| 3 | 24 | Felipa Palacios (COL) | 23.15 q | |
| 6 | 25 | Sanna Hernesniemi-Kyllonen (FIN) | 23.17 q | |
| 1 | 26 | Lauren Hewitt (AUS) | 23.18 Q | |
| 1 | 27 | Katharine Merry (GBR) | 23.20 q | |
| 4 | 28 | Gabi Rockmeier (GER) | 23.22 | |
| 2 | 29 | Simmone Jacobs (GBR) | 23.23 Q | SB |
| 5 | 30 | Pauline Davis-Thompson (BAH) | 23.26 Q | |
| 5 | 31 | Cheryl Taplin (USA) | 23.28 Q | |
| 5 | 32 | Katia Benth (FRA) | 23.33 Q | |
| 1 | 33 | Melissa Straker (BAR) | 23.45 | SB |
| 4 | 33 | Patricia Rodríguez (COL) | 23.45 | |
| 5 | 35 | Marina Filipović (YUG) | 23.54 | |
| 6 | 36 | Monika Gachevska (BUL) | 23.55 | |
| 2 | 37 | Shanta Ghosh (GER) | 23.58 Q | |
| 3 | 38 | Natalya Vinogradova-Safronnikova (BLR) | 23.66 | |
| 2 | 39 | Aïda Diop (SEN) | 23.71 | |
| 7 | 40 | Ladonna Antoine (CAN) | 23.86 | |
| 5 | 41 | Heather Samuel (ATG) | 23.93 | |
| 2 | 42 | Danielle Perpoli (ITA) | 23.96 | |
| 3 | 42 | Svetlana Bodritskaya (KAZ) | 23.96 | |
| 6 | 44 | Dora Kyriakou (CYP) | 24.08 | |
| 4 | 45 | Vernetta Lesforis (LCA) | 24.27 | |
| 1 | 46 | Ameerah Bello (ISV) | 24.31 | |
| 7 | 47 | Georgette Nkoma (CMR) | 24.53 | |
| 7 | 48 | Rossa Maira (PNG) | 25.02 | SB |
| 6 | 49 | Laure Kuetey (BEN) | 25.15 | PB |
| 7 | 50 | Fanta Dao (MLI) | 25.35 | |
| 5 | 51 | Sittina Djabiri (COM) | 30.88 | |
| 5 | | Natalya Pomoshchnikova-Voronova (RUS) | DNF | |
| 2 | | Nadjina Kaltouma (CHA) | DNS | |

=== Second round ===
6 August

| Heat | Rank | Name | Result | Notes |
|---|---|---|---|---|
| 4 | 1 | Melinda Gainsford (AUS) | 22.45 Q | |
| 2 | 2 | Susanthika Jayasinghe (SRI) | 22.47 Q | |
| 4 | 3 | Sylviane Félix (FRA) | 22.56 Q | PB |
| 4 | 3 | Zhanna Pintusevich (UKR) | 22.56 Q | |
| 2 | 5 | Marina Trandenkova (RUS) | 22.63 Q | |
| 1 | 6 | Merlene Ottey (JAM) | 22.65 Q | |
| 3 | 7 | Marie-José Pérec (FRA) | 22.69 Q | |
| 4 | 8 | Juliet Campbell (JAM) | 22.75 q | |
| 4 | 9 | Zundra Feagin (USA) | 22.81 q | SB |
| 2 | 10 | Juliet Cuthbert (JAM) | 22.83 Q | |
| 3 | 11 | Inger Miller (USA) | 22.85 Q | |
| 4 | 12 | Petya Pendareva (BUL) | 22.90 q | SB |
| 1 | 13 | Yekaterina Leshchova (RUS) | 22.91 Q | |
| 3 | 14 | Merlene Frazer (JAM) | 22.92 Q | |
| 4 | 15 | Liu Xiaomei (CHN) | 22.95 q | |
| 2 | 16 | Yan Jiankui (CHN) | 22.97 | SB |
| 1 | 17 | Ekaterini Koffa (GRE) | 23.05 Q | |
| 1 | 18 | Li Xuemei (CHN) | 23.06 | |
| 2 | 19 | Cheryl Taplin (USA) | 23.07 | |
| 2 | 19 | Chandra Sturrup (BAH) | 23.07 | |
| 3 | 21 | Pauline Davis (BAH) | 23.13 | |
| 1 | 22 | Lucrecia Jardim (POR) | 23.16 | |
| 2 | 23 | Katia Benth (FRA) | 23.20 | |
| 3 | 24 | Melanie Paschke (GER) | 23.22 | |
| 1 | 25 | Hana Benešová (CZE) | 23.34 | |
| 3 | 25 | Felipa Palacios (COL) | 23.34 | |
| 3 | 27 | Alenka Bikar (SLO) | 23.43 | |
| 2 | 28 | Simmone Jacobs (GBR) | 23.49 | |
| 3 | 29 | Sanna Hernesniemi (FIN) | 23.52 | |
| 1 | 30 | Lauren Hewitt (AUS) | 23.53 | |
| 4 | 31 | Shanta Ghosh (GER) | 23.62 | |
| 1 | 32 | Katharine Merry (GBR) | 23.98 | |

=== Semifinals ===
7 August

| Heat | Rank | Name | Result | Notes |
|---|---|---|---|---|
| 2 | 1 | Merlene Ottey (JAM) | 22.26 Q | SB |
| 2 | 2 | Susanthika Jayasinghe (SRI) | 22.33 Q | AR |
| 2 | 3 | Sylviane Félix (FRA) | 22.57 Q | |
| 2 | 4 | Yekaterina Leshchova (RUS) | 22.59 Q | |
| 1 | 4 | Inger Miller (USA) | 22.59 Q | |
| 1 | 6 | Zhanna Pintusevich (UKR) | 22.65 Q | |
| 1 | 7 | Marina Trandenkova (RUS) | 22.69 Q | |
| 1 | 8 | Melinda Gainsford (AUS) | 22.70 Q | |
| 2 | 8 | Ekaterini Koffa (GRE) | 22.70 | SB |
| 1 | 10 | Merlene Frazer (JAM) | 22.81 | |
| 2 | 11 | Zundra Feagin (USA) | 22.92 | |
| 1 | 12 | Juliet Campbell (JAM) | 22.94 | |
| 2 | 13 | Juliet Cuthbert (JAM) | 23.03 | |
| 1 | 13 | Liu Xiaomei (CHN) | 23.03 | |
| 2 | — | Petya Pendareva (BUL) | DNS | |
| 1 | — | Marie-José Pérec (FRA) | DNS | |

=== Final ===
8 August

| Rank | Name | Result | Notes |
|---|---|---|---|
| Gold medal | Zhanna Pintusevich (UKR) | 22.32 | |
| Silver medal | Susanthika Jayasinghe (SRI) | 22.39 | |
| Bronze medal | Merlene Ottey (JAM) | 22.40 | |
| 4 | Yekaterina Leshchova (RUS) | 22.50 | |
| 5 | Inger Miller (USA) | 22.52 | |
| 6 | Marina Trandenkova (RUS) | 22.65 | |
| 7 | Melinda Gainsford (AUS) | 22.73 | |
| 8 | Sylviane Félix (FRA) | 22.81 | |
