= Athletics at the 1997 Summer Universiade – Women's 4 × 100 metres relay =

The women's 4 × 100 metres relay event at the 1997 Summer Universiade was held on 31 August at the Stadio Cibali in Catania, Italy.

== Results ==
Rank	Nation	Athletes	Time	Notes
1st place, gold medalist(s)	United States	Juan Ball, Melinda Sergent, Andrea Anderson, Passion Richardson	44.04	
2nd place, silver medalist(s)	Russia	Yekaterina Leshcheva, Irina Korotya, Olga Povtoryova, Natalya Ignatova	44.37	
3rd place, bronze medalist(s)	Canada	Sonia Paquette, Tara Perry, LaDonna Antoine, Karen Clarke	44.59	
4	Nigeria	Amara Ezem-Wallace, Angela Atede, Rose Abo, Patience Itanyi	45.03	
5	Italy	Elena Apollonio, Irene Daniele, Manuela Grillo, Anita Pistone	45.75	
6	Brazil	Lorena de Oliveira, Maria Aparecida de Souza, Luciana dos Santos, Adriana Francisco	46.31	
