= 2001 IAAF World Indoor Championships – Women's 200 metres =

The women's 200 metres event at the 2001 IAAF World Indoor Championships was held on March 9–10.

== Medalists ==
Gold	Silver	Bronze
Juliet Campbell; Jamaica	LaTasha Jenkins; United States	Natalya Vinogradova-Safronnikova; Belarus

== Results ==
=== Heats ===
The winner of each heat (Q) and next 6 fastest (q) qualified for the semifinals.

Rank	Heat	Name	Nationality	Time	Notes
1	1	Susanthika Jayasinghe	Sri Lanka	22.99	Q, AR
2	6	Juliet Campbell	Jamaica	23.06	Q
3	2	Natalya Vinogradova-Safronnikova	Belarus	23.23	Q
4	2	Birgit Rockmeier	Germany	23.28	q
5	3	Muriel Hurtis	France	23.29	Q
6	5	LaTasha Jenkins	United States	23.30	Q
7	4	Alenka Bikar	Slovenia	23.43	Q
8	5	Fabe Dia	France	23.45	q
9	1	Nora Ivanova-Güner	Turkey	23.46	q
10	4	Karin Mayr	Austria	23.52	q
11	3	Anastasiya Kapachinskaya	Russia	23.53	q
12	5	Damayanthi Dharsha	Sri Lanka	23.78	q
13	4	Natalya Mikhaylovskaya	Russia	23.79	
14	6	Kelli White	United States	23.81	
15	6	Liu Xiaomei	China	24.20	
16	3	Enikő Szabó	Hungary	24.49	
17	1	Alena Petrova	Turkmenistan	24.68	
18	1	Hazel Mthetfwa	Swaziland	28.19	
19	2	Shamila Abdul Majeed	Maldives	28.71	
	2	Myriam Léonie Mani	Cameroon	DNS	

=== Semifinals ===
First 2 of each semifinal (Q) qualified directly for the final.

Rank	Heat	Name	Nationality	Time	Notes
1	1	Juliet Campbell	Jamaica	22.72	Q, WL
2	3	Natalya Vinogradova-Safronnikova	Belarus	23.02	Q, NR
3	1	LaTasha Jenkins	United States	23.03	Q
4	2	Susanthika Jayasinghe	Sri Lanka	23.04	Q
5	3	Muriel Hurtis	France	23.06	Q, SB
6	2	Alenka Bikar	Slovenia	23.27	Q, SB
7	2	Birgit Rockmeier	Germany	23.35	
8	1	Fabe Dia	France	23.39	
9	3	Karin Mayr	Austria	23.52	
10	1	Anastasiya Kapachinskaya	Russia	23.61	
11	3	Nora Ivanova-Güner	Turkey	23.62	
12	2	Damayanthi Dharsha	Sri Lanka	24.00	

=== Final ===
Rank	Name	Nationality	Time	Notes
1st place, gold medalist(s)	Juliet Campbell	Jamaica	22.64	WL
2nd place, silver medalist(s)	LaTasha Jenkins	United States	22.96	PB
3rd place, bronze medalist(s)	Natalya Vinogradova-Safronnikova	Belarus	23.17	
4	Susanthika Jayasinghe	Sri Lanka	23.24	
5	Muriel Hurtis	France	23.63	
6	Alenka Bikar	Slovenia	23.74	
