= 2001 World Championships in Athletics – Women's 200 metres =

These are the official results of the Women's 200 metres event at the 2001 IAAF World Championships in Edmonton, Canada.

== Medalists ==
Gold	(The Bahamas) Debbie Ferguson; Bahamas (BAH)
Silver	LaTasha Jenkins; United States (USA)
Bronze	Cydonie Mothersill; Cayman Islands (CAY)

== Results ==
=== Heats ===
First 4 of each Heat (Q) and the next 4 fastest (q) qualified for the semifinals.

Rank	Heat	Name	Nationality	Time	Notes
1	5	Cydonie Mothersill	Cayman Islands	22.54	Q, NR
2	2	Beverly McDonald	Jamaica	22.70	Q, SB
3	4	LaTasha Jenkins	United States	22.82	Q
4	4	Myriam Léonie Mani	Cameroon	22.82	Q
5	4	Mary Onyali-Omagbemi	Nigeria	22.87	Q, SB
6	1	K.V.Damayanthi Dharsha	Sri Lanka	22.88	Q
6	5	Juliet Campbell	Jamaica	22.88	Q
8	2	Aïda Diop	Senegal	22.91	Q, SB
9	4	Johanna Manninen	Finland	22.93	Q, PB
9	5	Alenka Bikar	Slovenia	22.93	Q
11	4	Gabi Rockmeier	Germany	22.95	q
12	5	Inger Miller	United States	22.98	Q, SB
13	3	Debbie Ferguson	Bahamas	23.00	Q
14	1	Birgit Rockmeier	Germany	23.01	Q
15	3	Sarah Reilly	Ireland	23.02	Q, NR
16	2	Lauren Hewitt	Australia	23.07	Q
16	4	Fabe Dia	France	23.07	q, SB
18	1	Kim Gevaert	Belgium	23.10	Q
19	3	Louise Ayetotche	Ivory Coast	23.15	Q
20	5	Manuela Levorato	Italy	23.23	q
21	1	Irina Khabarova	Russia	23.25	Q
22	1	Natalya Safronnikova	Belarus	23.30	q
23	1	Liliana Allen	Mexico	23.32	
24	5	Felipa Palacios	Colombia	23.40	
25	1	Aleen Bailey	Jamaica	23.70	
26	2	LaDonna Antoine	Canada	23.76	
27	3	Lyubov Perepelova	Uzbekistan	24.03	
28	2	Gabriela Patterson	Costa Rica	24.37	PB
29	3	Karin Mayr	Austria	24.38	
30	5	Natasha Mayers	Saint Vincent and the Grenadines	24.91	
31	5	Marcia Daniel	Dominica	25.04	
32	2	Ann Mooney	Papua New Guinea	25.34	
33	3	Ekundayo Williams	Sierra Leone	25.35	
34	1	Kaitinano Mwemweata	Kiribati	28.76	NR
	2	Susanthika Jayasinghe	Sri Lanka	DQ	
	2	Kelli White	United States	DQ	
	3	Marion Jones	United States	DQ	
	3	Yekaterina Leshchova	Russia	DQ	
	4	Valma Bass	Saint Kitts and Nevis	DNS	
	4	Nadjina Kaltouma	Chad	DNS	

=== Semifinals ===
First 2 of each Heat (Q) and the next 2 fastest (q) qualified for the final.

Rank	Heat	Name	Nationality	Time	Notes
1	3	Debbie Ferguson	Bahamas	22.39	Q, SB
2	2	Myriam Léonie Mani	Cameroon	22.59	Q, SB
3	2	LaTasha Jenkins	United States	22.63	Q
4	2	Cydonie Mothersill	Cayman Islands	22.63	q
5	1	Juliet Campbell	Jamaica	22.68	Q
6	2	Alenka Bikar	Slovenia	22.76	q, NR
7	3	Mary Onyali-Omagbemi	Nigeria	22.80	SB
8	3	Inger Miller	United States	22.80	SB
9	3	Beverly McDonald	Jamaica	22.84	
10	1	K.V.Damayanthi Dharsha	Sri Lanka	22.88	SB
11	2	Aïda Diop	Senegal	22.94	
12	1	Birgit Rockmeier	Germany	22.97	
13	2	Natalya Safronnikova	Belarus	23.02	
14	2	Lauren Hewitt	Australia	23.05	
15	1	Johanna Manninen	Finland	23.11	
16	1	Manuela Levorato	Italy	23.13	
17	1	Fabe Dia	France	23.14	
18	3	Sarah Reilly	Ireland	23.24	
19	1	Kim Gevaert	Belgium	23.29	
20	3	Irina Khabarova	Russia	23.43	
21	2	Louise Ayetotche	Ivory Coast	23.47	
	3	Gabi Rockmeier	Germany	DNF	
	1	Marion Jones	United States	DQ	
	3	Kelli White	United States	DQ	

=== Final ===
Rank	Lane	Name	Nationality	React	Time	Notes
1st place, gold medalist(s)	4	Debbie Ferguson	Bahamas	0.176	22.52	
2nd place, silver medalist(s)	7	LaTasha Jenkins	United States	0.157	22.85	
3rd place, bronze medalist(s)	1	Cydonie Mothersill	Cayman Islands	0.164	22.88	
4	2	Juliet Campbell	Jamaica	0.169	22.99	
5	8	Alenka Bikar	Slovenia	0.160	23.00	
6	6	Myriam Léonie Mani	Cameroon	0.140	23.15	
	5	Marion Jones	United States	0.186	DQ	
	3	Kelli White	United States	0.147	DQ	
