= Gigandet =

Gigandet is a surname. Notable people with the surname include:

- Cam Gigandet (born 1982), American actor
- Xavier Gigandet (born 1966), Swiss alpine skier

== See also ==
- Mireille Gigandet-Donders (born 1974), retired Swiss athlete who specialised in sprinting events
