= 1997 European Athletics U23 Championships – Women's 4 × 100 metres relay =

The women's 4 x 100 metres relay event at the 1997 European Athletics U23 Championships was held in Turku, Finland, on 13 July 1997.

== Medalists ==
Gold	Esther Möller; Shanta Ghosh; Nancy Kette; Silke Eichmann; Germany
Silver	Yelena Tishkova; Irina Korotya; Olga Maksimova; Yuliya Vertyanova; Russia
Bronze	Elena Apollonio; Elena Sordelli; Manuela Grillo; Manuela Levorato; Italy

== Results ==
=== Final ===
13 July

Rank	Nation	Competitors	Time	Notes
1st place, gold medalist(s)	Germany	Esther Möller; Shanta Ghosh; Nancy Kette; Silke Eichmann	43.94	
2nd place, silver medalist(s)	Russia	Yelena Tishkova; Irina Korotya; Olga Maksimova; Yuliya Vertyanova	44.41	
3rd place, bronze medalist(s)	Italy	Elena Apollonio; Elena Sordelli; Manuela Grillo; Manuela Levorato	44.73	
4	Sweden	Sofi Hildenborg; Victoria Gunnarsson; Camilla Johansson; Annika Amundin	45.17	
	France	Doris Deruel; Sandra Citté; Marie Joëlle Dogbo; Katia Benth	DNF	

== Participation ==
According to an unofficial count, 20 athletes from 5 countries participated in the event.

- France (4)
- Germany (4)
- Italy (4)
- Russia (4)
- Sweden (4)
