= Zuzanna Radecka =

Polish sprinter

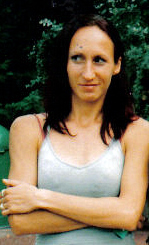
- Radecka in 2007

Personal information
- Nationality: Polish
- Born: 2 April 1975 (age 51) Ruda Śląska, Poland

Sport
- Sport: Athletics
- Event: 400 m hurdles
Medal record
Women's athletics
Representing Poland
European Championships
Bronze medal – third place	2002 Munich	4 x 400 m relay
Summer Universiade
Silver medal – second place	1999 Palma de Mallorca	100 m

Zuzanna Anna Radecka-Pakaszewska (born 2 April 1975) is a retired Polish sprinter. She represented her country at two Summer Olympics, in 2000 and 2004, as well as three outdoor and two indoor World Championships. Most of her success came in the relay, her biggest individual achievement being a silver medal at the 1999 Summer Universiade.

== Achievements ==
Year	Competition	Venue	Position	Event	Notes
Representing Poland
1999	World Indoor Championships	Maebashi, Japan	15th (sf)	60 m	7.37
1999	World Indoor Championships	Maebashi, Japan	12th (sf)	200 m	23.67
1999	Universiade	Palma de Mallorca, Spain	2nd	200 m	23.14
1999	Universiade	Palma de Mallorca, Spain	2nd	4 × 100 m relay	43.74
1999	World Championships	Seville, Spain	22nd (qf)	200 m	22.96
1999	World Championships	Seville, Spain	7th	4 × 100 m relay	43.51
2000	European Indoor Championships	Ghent, Belgium	9th (sf)	200 m	23.55
2000	Olympic Games	Sydney, Australia	38th (h)	200 m	23.57
2000	Olympic Games	Sydney, Australia	15th (sf)	4 × 400 m relay	44.07
2002	European Championships	Munich, Germany	20th (h)	200 m	23.71
2002	European Championships	Munich, Germany	8th (h)	4 × 100 m relay	43.97
2002	European Championships	Munich, Germany	3rd	4 × 400 m relay	3:26.15
2004	World Indoor Championships	Budapest, Hungary	4th	4 × 400 m relay	3:30.52 (NR)
2004	Olympic Games	Athens, Greece	5th	4 × 400 m relay	3:25.22
2005	World Championships	Osaka, Japan	4th	4 × 400 m relay	3:24.49 (NR)
2007	European Indoor Championships	Birmingham, United Kingdom	11th (sf)	400 m	53.18
2007	European Indoor Championships	Birmingham, United Kingdom	4th	4 × 400 m relay	3:30.31
2007	World Championships	Osaka, Japan	25th (h)	400 m	52.19
2007	World Championships	Osaka, Japan	6th	4 × 400 m relay	3:26.49

== Personal bests ==
Outdoor

- 100 metres – 11.29 (2000)
- 200 metres – 22.96 (1999 & 2000)
- 400 metres – 51.58 (2005)
- 100 metres hurdles – 13.83 (1998)

Indoor

- 60 metres – 7.28 (2000)
- 200 metres – 23.36 (1999)
- 400 metres – 52.54 (2007)
