= Akonga Nsimbo =

Congolese sprinter

Personal information
- Nationality: Congolese
- Born: 9 January 1982 (age 43)

Sport
- Sport: Sprinting
- Event: 100 metres

Akonga Nsimbo (born 9 January 1982) is a Congolese sprinter. She competed in the women's 100 metres at the 2000 Summer Olympics.
