= Joan van den Akker =

Dutch sprinter

Personal information
- Full name: Joan van den Akker
- Born: 16 January 1984 (age 42) Delft, Netherlands
- Years active: 1990–2007
- Height: 1.64 m (5 ft 5 in)
- Weight: 58 kg (128 lb)

Achievements and titles
- Personal best(s): 100m - 11.35 (2004); 200m - 24.33 (2002)
- Updated on 20 March 2008

Joan van den Akker (born 16 January 1984 in Delft) is a former Dutch sprinter.

Already at the age of six Van den Akker became interested in athletics, although she loved riding, tennis and streetdance as well. When she was twelve years old she started competing in the heptathlon, because she liked doing all the events. Gradually her sprinting talent came to the surface, however and in 2002 she was present at the World Junior Championships in Kingston, Jamaica, finishing a good 6th and 7th in the 100 and 200 metres respectively.

In 2003 Joan van den Akker participated in the World Championships in Paris as a member of the Dutch 4 x 100 metres relay team, together with Jacqueline Poelman, Pascal van Assendelft and Annemarie Kramer. The team nominated itself for the 2004 Summer Olympics, realising the twelfth time out of twenty teams in competition. And although the final remained beyond reach, the Dutch four set a season's fastest time, scoring 43.96.

The same relay formation as in the preceding year participated at the Summer Olympics in Athens. They were however eliminated in the series due to a mistake in the changing area.

In April 2007 Van den Akker, who became Dutch 100 metres champion in 2004, announced her withdrawal from athletics. She claimed no longer to be able to cope with the continuous series of foot injuries, since all kinds of treatments had brought no improvements.

== Personal bests ==
Outdoor

- 100 metres - 11.35 (2004)
- 200 metres - 24.33 (2002)

Indoor

- 60 metres - 7.44 (2004)

== Bibliography ==
- Werkgroep Statistiek KNAU (2005). Statistisch jaarboek indooratletiek, Seizoen 2003-2004. IJsselstein: KNAU.
