= Foujia Huda =

Bangladeshi sprinter

Personal information
- Nationality: Bangladeshi
- Born: 21 February 1985 (age 40)

Sport
- Sport: Sprinting
- Event: 100 metres

Foujia Huda (born 21 February 1985) is a Bangladeshi sprinter. She competed in the women's 100 metres at the 2000 Summer Olympics.
