= Pascal van Assendelft =

Dutch sprinter (born 1979)

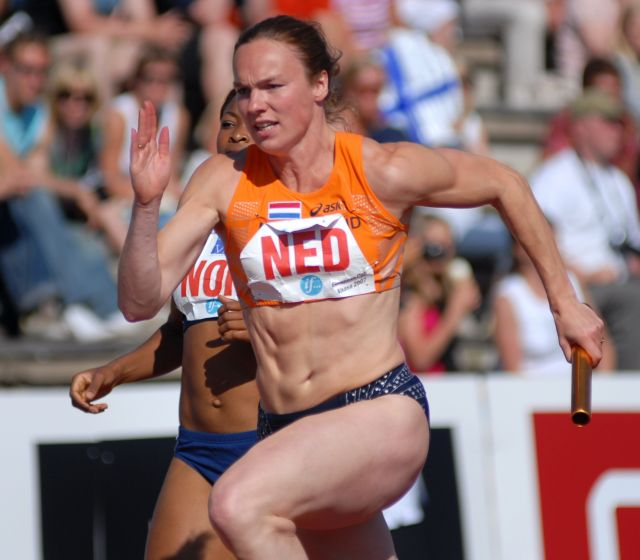

Personal information
- Full name: Pascal van Assendelft
- Born: 6 October 1979 (age 46) Leidschendam, Netherlands
- Years active: 2001-2007
- Height: 1.76 m (5 ft 9 in)
- Weight: 64 kg (141 lb)

Achievements and titles
- Personal bests: 100m - 11.50 (2002); 200m - 23.65 (2002)
- Updated on 19 March 2008

Pascal van Assendelft (born October 6, 1979, in Leidschendam) is a former Dutch sprinter. She started her career in athletics at the age of thirteen and was to become a sprinting athlete, competing at European and Olympic level.

In 2001, she took part in the European Championships for athletes younger than 23 years, starting in the 100 and 200 metres and reaching the semi-final on both occasions. Two years later Pascal van Assendelft participated in the World Championships in Paris as a member of the Dutch 4 x 100 metres relay team, together with Jacqueline Poelman, Annemarie Kramer and Joan van den Akker. Although the team did not reach the final, it nominated itself for the 2004 Summer Olympics, realising the twelfth time out of twenty teams in competition. The 43.96 was the season's fastest time of the Dutch four.

One year later the same relay formation participated at the Athens Olympic Games. They were however eliminated in the series due to a mistake in the changing area.

Van Assendelft became Dutch champion 60 metres indoor in 2007, having obtained this title five times before, from 2001 until 2005. She also won the 100 and 200 metres at the Dutch National Championships in 2007.

On December 18, 2007, Pascal van Assendelft announced her withdrawal from athletics. The 28-year-old athlete had taken her decision after being unable to improve her personal bests in the preceding season.

During her career in athletics she was sponsored by ASICS, Franco Canadian Holland.

Van Assendelft is a 2005 graduate from the Utrecht School of the Arts. She is a professional Interaction Designer.

== Personal bests ==
Outdoor

- 100 metres - 11.50 (2002)
- 200 metres - 23.65 (2002)

Indoor

- 60 metres - 7.40 (2004)

== Bibliography ==
- Werkgroep Statistiek KNAU (2005). Statistische jaarboeken indooratletiek, Seizoenen 2002-2003 en 2003-2004. IJsselstein: KNAU.
- Bijkerk, Ton (2004). Olympisch Oranje. Haarlem: De Vrieseborch. ISBN 90-6076-522-2.
