= 2019 Cricket World Cup opening ceremony =

The Opening Ceremony of the Cricket World Cup 2019 took place on 29 May 2019, at The Mall in central London. The ICC promised that the opening ceremony would be the ‘most celebrated start to a Cricket World Cup ever’. The ceremony included live sport, music and entertainment for a planned 4,000 fans. Cricket journalist Andy Bull estimated that "there cannot have been many more than 400" fans actually present, which he ascribed in part to heavy rain. It ended with the official World Cup song, "Stand By", performed by Loryn and Rudimental.

== Theme song ==
On 17 May 2019, ICC unveiled its official theme song for the World Cup, titled "Stand By". The song was performed by the Canadian singer Loryn and the British band Rudimental.

== Ceremony ==
The ceremony was held on The Mall, with Buckingham Palace as the backdrop. It featured the team captains, former cricketers, dignitaries, celebrities and singers.

The ceremony was hosted by ex-England cricketer Andrew Flintoff, Indian actress and presenter Shibani Dandekar and English TV presenter Paddy McGuinness.

The captains of the ten participating nations were introduced on the stage. Then the nations were represented in a ten-team celebrity street cricket game, with each team formed of a former cricketer and a celebrity from their country.

The participants were: Afghanistan's Mirwais Ashraf and singer songwriter Aryana Sayeed, Sri Lanka's Mahela Jayawardene and athlete Damayanthi Dharsha, West Indies' Viv Richards and Jamaican sprinter Yohan Blake, Bangladesh's Abdur Razaak and actress Jaya Ahsan, Pakistan's Azhar Ali and 2014 Nobel Peace Prize laureate Malala Yousafzai, Australia's Brett Lee and former tennis player Pat Cash, New Zealand's James Franklin and former Rugby player Sean Fitzpatrick, South Africa's Jacques Kallis and former footballer Steven Pienaar, India's Anil Kumble and actor-director Farhan Akhtar, and England's Kevin Pietersen and TV personality Chris Hughes.

The hour-long show closed with a live performance of the official tournament song, "Stand By", by Loryn and Rudimental.
