= Athletics at the 2000 Summer Olympics – Women's 100 metres =

Women's 100 metres at the Games of the XXVII Olympiad
- Venue: Stadium Australia
- Date: 22–23 September
- Competitors: 84 from 63 nations

Medalists
1st place, gold medalist(s)		not awarded	
2nd place, silver medalist(s)		Ekaterini Thanou	Greece
2nd place, silver medalist(s)		Tayna Lawrence	Jamaica
3rd place, bronze medalist(s)		Merlene Ottey	Jamaica

The women's 100 metres at the 2000 Summer Olympics as part of the athletics program were held at the Stadium Australia on 22 September 2000 and 23 September 2000.

The top three runners in each of the initial ten heats automatically qualified for the second round. The next two fastest runners from across the heats also qualified for the second round. The top four runners in each of the four second round heats automatically qualified for the semi-final.

The gold medal was originally won by Marion Jones of the United States. However, on 5 October 2007, she admitted to having used performance-enhancing drugs prior to the 2000 Olympics. On 9 October she relinquished her medals to the United States Olympic Committee, and on 12 December the International Olympic Committee formally stripped her of her medals.

The IOC did not initially decide to regrade the results, as silver medalist Ekaterini Thanou had herself been subsequently involved in a doping scandal in the run-up to the 2004 Summer Olympics. After two years of deliberation, in late 2009 the IOC decided to upgrade Lawrence and Ottey to silver and bronze respectively, and leave Thanou as a silver medallist, with the gold medal withheld.

== Records ==
Prior to this competition, the existing world and Olympic records were as follows:

World record	Florence Griffith Joyner (USA)	10.49 s	Indianapolis, United States	16 July 1988
Olympic record	Florence Griffith Joyner (USA)	10.62 s	Seoul, South Korea	24 September 1988

No new world or Olympic records were set for this event.

== Results ==
=== Heats ===
The heats were held on Friday, 22 September 2000.

==== Heat 1 ====
Rank	Lane	Athlete	Nation	Reaction	Time	Notes
1	6	Sevatheda Fynes	Bahamas	0.164	11.18	Q
2	5	Leonie Mani	Cameroon	0.152	11.24	Q
3	4	Valma Bass	Saint Kitts and Nevis	0.174	11.45	Q
4	3	Karin Mayr	Austria	0.166	11.50	
5	1	Joice Maduaka	Great Britain	0.230	11.51	
6	7	Martha Adusei	Canada	0.254	11.82	
7	2	Mari Paz Mosana Motanga	Equatorial Guinea	0.281	12.91	
8	8	Isménia do Frederico	Cape Verde	0.190	12.99	

==== Heat 2 ====
Rank	Lane	Athlete	Nation	Reaction	Time	Notes
1	8	Christine Arron	France	0.261	11.42	Q
2	1	Lyubov Perepelova	Uzbekistan	0.256	11.48	Q
3	2	Sarah Reilly	Ireland	0.181	11.56	Q
4	6	Natasha Laren Mayers	Saint Vincent and the Grenadines	0.215	11.61	
5	3	Aminata Diouf	Senegal	0.234	11.65	
6	7	Fana Ashby	Trinidad and Tobago	0.243	11.85	
7	4	Peoria Koshiba	Palau	0.239	12.66	NR
8	5	Jenny Keni	Solomon Islands	0.275	13.01	

==== Heat 3 ====
Rank	Lane	Athlete	Nation	Reaction	Time	Notes
1	1	Zhanna Pintusevych	Ukraine	0.215	11.27	Q
2	8	Beverly McDonald	Jamaica	0.181	11.36	Q
3	3	Joan Uduak Ekah	Nigeria	0.173	11.60	Q
4	7	Ayanna Hutchinson	Trinidad and Tobago	0.248	11.78	
5	6	Lerma Elmira Bulauitan	Philippines	0.261	12.08	
6	2	Vukosava Đapić	FR Yugoslavia	0.183	12.12	
7	5	Emma Wade	Belize	0.164	12.25	PB
8	4	Luz Marina Geerman	Aruba	0.242	12.96	

==== Heat 4 ====
Rank	Lane	Athlete	Nation	Reaction	Time	Notes
1	5	Susanthika Jayasinghe	Sri Lanka	0.206	11.15	Q
2	6	Anzhela Kravchenko	Ukraine	0.234	11.35	Q
3	1	Mary Onyali-Omagbemi	Nigeria	0.192	11.36	Q
4	8	Lauren Hewitt	Australia	0.202	11.42	q
5	3	Mireille Donders	Switzerland	0.169	11.63	
6	4	Heidi Hannula	Finland	0.228	11.68	
7	4	Lina Bejjani	Lebanon		12.98	
8	2	Regina Shotaro	Federated States of Micronesia	0.272	13.69	

==== Heat 5 ====
Rank	Lane	Athlete	Nation	Reaction	Time	Notes
1	6	Ekaterini Thanou	Greece	0.155	11.10	Q
2	8	Iryna Pukha	Ukraine	0.154	11.41	Q
3	2	Hanitriniaina Rakotondrabe	Madagascar	0.190	11.50	Q
4	4	Heather Samuel	Antigua and Barbuda	0.169	11.62	
5	5	Viktoriya Kovyreva	Kazakhstan	0.225	11.72	
6	3	Agnė Visockaitė	Lithuania	0.277	11.87	
7	7	Devi Maya Paneru	Nepal	0.170	12.74	
8	9	Foujia Huda	Bangladesh	0.214	12.75	
9	1	Sylla M'Mah Touré	Guinea	0.259	12.82	

==== Heat 6 ====
Rank	Lane	Athlete	Nation	Reaction	Time	Notes
1	5	Marion Jones	United States	0.165	11.20	Q
2	7	Sandra Citte	France	0.182	11.47	Q
3	4	Monica Afia Twum	Ghana	0.172	11.48	Q
4	3	Marina Trandenkova	Russia	0.178	11.51	
5	1	Shani Anderson	Great Britain	0.190	11.55	
6	6	Ekundayo Williams	Sierra Leone	0.256	12.19	
7	8	Laure Kuetey	Benin	0.201	12.40	
8	2	Suzanne Spiteri	Malta	0.207	12.57	
9	9	Shamha Ahmed	Maldives		12.87	

==== Heat 7 ====
Rank	Lane	Athlete	Nation	Reaction	Time	Notes
1	1	Chandra Sturrup	Bahamas	0.180	11.31	Q
2	3	Mercy Nku	Nigeria	0.196	11.41	Q
3	8	Nataliya Ignatova	Russia	0.187	11.54	Q
4	5	Marcia Richardson	Great Britain	0.201	11.62	
5	6	Paraskevi Patoulidou	Greece	0.216	11.65	
6	4	Joanna Hoareau	Seychelles	0.261	12.01	
7	2	Akonga Nsimbo	Democratic Republic of the Congo	0.234	12.51	NR
8	9	Tamara Shanidze	Georgia	0.273	12.56	
9	7	Fatou Dieng	Mauritania	0.201	13.69	

==== Heat 8 ====
Rank	Lane	Athlete	Nation	Reaction	Time	Notes
1	7	Debbie Ferguson	Bahamas	0.190	11.10	Q
2	4	Li Xuemei	China	0.185	11.25	Q, SB
3	5	Torri Edwards	United States	0.159	11.34	Q
4	2	Cydonie Mothersill	Cayman Islands	0.226	11.38	q
5	1	Ameerah Bello	Virgin Islands	0.245	11.64	
6	3	Grace Dinkins	Liberia	0.174	11.79	
7	8	Anais Oyembo	Gabon	0.158	12.19	SB
8	6	Mariam Mohamed Hadi Al Hilli	Bahrain		13.98	SB

==== Heat 9 ====
Rank	Lane	Athlete	Nation	Reaction	Time	Notes
1	3	Merlene Ottey	Jamaica	0.235	11.24	Q
2	4	Petya Pendareva	Bulgaria	0.198	11.30	Q
3	6	Melinda Gainsford-Taylor	Australia	0.191	11.34	Q
4	7	Natalya Voronova	Russia	0.188	11.47	
5	5	Louise Ayetotche	Ivory Coast	0.267	11.52	
6	8	Irene Joseph	Indonesia	0.233	11.93	
7	1	Chen Shu-chuan	Chinese Taipei	0.241	12.22	
8	2	Sarah Tonde	Burkina Faso	0.216	12.56	
9	9	Sandjema Batouli	Comoros	0.253	13.58	

==== Heat 10 ====
Rank	Lane	Athlete	Nation	Reaction	Time	Notes
1	3	Chryste Gaines	United States	0.208	11.06	Q
2	8	Tayna Lawrence	Jamaica	0.165	11.14	Q
3	5	Vida Nsiah	Ghana	0.217	11.18	Q, NR
4	6	Esi Benyarku	Canada	0.185	11.55	
5	4	Zeng Xiujun	China	0.284	11.63	
6	1	Kadiatou Camara	Mali	0.249	11.65	NR
7	7	Joanne Durant	Barbados	0.242	11.82	
8	2	Chan Than Ouk	Cambodia		14.13	

=== Quarterfinals ===
The quarterfinals were held on Friday, 22 September 2000.

==== Quarterfinal 1 ====
Rank	Lane	Athlete	Nation	Reaction	Time	Notes
1	4	Merlene Ottey	Jamaica	0.203	11.08	Q
2	5	Debbie Ferguson	Bahamas	0.192	11.18	Q
3	2	Mercy Nku	Nigeria	0.172	11.26	Q
4	3	Christine Arron	France	0.214	11.26	Q
5	7	Torri Edwards	United States	0.168	11.32	
6	6	Anzhela Kravchenko	Ukraine	0.216	11.32	
7	8	Monica Afia Twum	Ghana	0.223	11.70	
8	1	Cydonie Mothersill	Cayman Islands	0.280	11.81	

==== Quarterfinal 2 ====
Rank	Lane	Athlete	Nation	Reaction	Time	Notes
1	3	Marion Jones	United States	0.215	10.83	Q
2	4	Ekaterini Thanou	Greece	0.180	10.99	Q
3	6	Tayna Lawrence	Jamaica	0.190	11.11	Q
4	1	Melinda Gainsford-Taylor	Australia	0.221	11.24	Q, SB
5	5	Petya Pendareva	Bulgaria	0.231	11.36	
6	2	Hanitriniaina Rakotondrabe	Madagascar	0.225	11.51	
7	7	Iryna Pukha	Ukraine	0.215	11.54	
8	8	Joan Uduak Ekah	Nigeria	0.265	11.67	

==== Quarterfinal 3 ====
Rank	Lane	Athlete	Nation	Reaction	Time	Notes
1	3	Zhanna Pintusevych	Ukraine	0.191	11.08	Q
2	6	Chryste Gaines	United States	0.216	11.21	Q
3	4	Chandra Sturrup	Bahamas	0.234	11.22	Q
4	5	Beverly McDonald	Jamaica	0.194	11.26	Q
5	7	Mary Onyali-Omagbemi	Nigeria	0.222	11.40	
6	1	Lauren Hewitt	Australia	0.196	11.54	
7	8	Valma Bass	Saint Kitts and Nevis	0.170	11.60	
8	2	Sandra Citte	France	0.253	11.63	

==== Quarterfinal 4 ====
Rank	Lane	Athlete	Nation	Reaction	Time	Notes
1	4	Sevatheda Fynes	Bahamas	0.175	11.10	Q
2	1	Vida Nsiah	Ghana	0.181	11.19	Q
3	3	Leonie Mani	Cameroon	0.157	11.23	Q
4	5	Susanthika Jayasinghe	Sri Lanka	0.226	11.23	Q
5	6	Li Xuemei	China	0.220	11.46	
6	8	Natalya Ignatova	Russia	0.198	11.47	
7	7	Sarah Reilly	Ireland	0.175	11.53	
8	2	Lyubov Perepelova	Uzbekistan	0.250	11.59	

=== Semifinals ===
The semifinals were held on Saturday, 23 September 2000.

==== Semifinal 1 ====
Rank	Lane	Athlete	Nation	Reaction	Time	Notes
1	4	Merlene Ottey	Jamaica	0.206	11.22	Q
2	7	Chandra Sturrup	Bahamas	0.202	11.31	Q
3	5	Zhanna Pintusevych	Ukraine	0.227	11.32	Q
4	3	Debbie Ferguson	Bahamas	0.281	11.34	Q
5	6	Vida Nsiah	Ghana	0.173	11.37	
6	2	Leonie Mani	Cameroon	0.196	11.40	
7	8	Christine Arron	France	0.253	11.42	
8	1	Melinda Gainsford-Taylor	Australia	0.210	11.45	

==== Semifinal 2 ====
Rank	Lane	Athlete	Nation	Reaction	Time	Notes
DSQ	5	Marion Jones	United States	0.192	~~11.01~~	Q
1	3	Ekaterini Thanou	Greece	0.205	11.10	Q
2	2	Tayna Lawrence	Jamaica	0.171	11.12	Q
3	6	Sevatheda Fynes	Bahamas	0.172	11.16	Q
4	4	Chryste Gaines	United States	0.201	11.23	
5	7	Beverly McDonald	Jamaica	0.193	11.31	
6	1	Susanthika Jayasinghe	Sri Lanka	0.188	11.33	
7	8	Mercy Nku	Nigeria	0.228	11.56	

=== Final ===
The final was held on Saturday, 23 September 2000.

Rank	Lane	Athlete	Nation	Reaction	Time	Notes
2nd place, silver medalist(s)	4	Ekaterini Thanou	Greece	0.206	11.12	
2nd place, silver medalist(s)	1	Tayna Lawrence	Jamaica	0.163	11.18	
3rd place, bronze medalist(s)	3	Merlene Ottey	Jamaica	0.179	11.19	
4	7	Zhanna Pintusevych	Ukraine	0.223	11.20	
5	6	Chandra Sturrup	Bahamas	0.193	11.21	
6	8	Sevatheda Fynes	Bahamas	0.253	11.22	
7	2	Debbie Ferguson	Bahamas	0.238	11.29	
—	5	Marion Jones	United States	0.189	~~10.75~~ DSQ	SB

Note: Thanou not awarded gold medal

== Results summary ==
=== Overall results for heats ===
Rank	Athlete	Nation	Heat	Lane	Place	Time	Qual.	Record
1	Chryste Gaines	United States	10	3	1	11.06	Q	
2	Debbie Ferguson	Bahamas	8	7	1	11.10	Q	
2	Ekaterini Thanou	Greece	5	6	1	11.10	Q	
4	Tayna Lawrence	Jamaica	10	8	2	11.14	Q	
5	Susanthika Jayasinghe	Sri Lanka	4	5	1	11.15	Q	
6	Sevatheda Fynes	Bahamas	1	6	1	11.18	Q	
6	Vida Nsiah	Ghana	10	5	3	11.18	Q	NR
8	Marion Jones	United States	6	5	1	11.20	Q	
9	Leonie Mani	Cameroon	1	5	2	11.24	Q	
9	Merlene Ottey	Jamaica	9	3	1	11.24	Q	
11	Li Xuemei	China	8	4	2	11.25	Q	SB
12	Zhanna Pintusevych	Ukraine	3	1	1	11.27	Q	
13	Petya Pendareva	Bulgaria	9	4	2	11.30	Q	
14	Chandra Sturrup	Bahamas	7	1	1	11.31	Q	
15	Torri Edwards	United States	8	5	3	11.34	Q	
15	Melinda Gainsford-Taylor	Australia	9	6	3	11.34	Q	
17	Anzhela Kravchenko	Ukraine	4	6	2	11.35	Q	
18	Beverly McDonald	Jamaica	3	8	2	11.36	Q	
18	Mary Onyali-Omagbemi	Nigeria	4	1	3	11.36	Q	
20	Cydonie Mothersill	Cayman Islands	8	2	4	11.38	q	
21	Mercy Nku	Nigeria	7	3	2	11.41	Q	
21	Iryna Pukha	Ukraine	5	8	2	11.41	Q	
23	Christine Arron	France	2	8	1	11.42	Q	
23	Lauren Hewitt	Australia	4	8	4	11.42	q	
25	Valma Bass	Saint Kitts and Nevis	1	4	3	11.45	Q	
26	Sandra Citte	France	6	7	2	11.47	Q	
26	Natalya Voronova	Russia	9	7	4	11.47		
28	Lyubov Perepelova	Uzbekistan	2	1	2	11.48	Q	
28	Monica Afia Twum	Ghana	6	4	3	11.48	Q	
30	Hanitriniaina Rakotondrabe	Madagascar	5	2	3	11.50	Q	
30	Karin Mayr	Austria	1	3	4	11.50		
32	Joice Maduaka	Great Britain	1	1	5	11.51		
32	Marina Trandenkova	Russia	6	3	4	11.51		
34	Louise Ayetotche	Ivory Coast	9	5	5	11.52		
35	Natalya Ignatova	Russia	7	8	3	11.54	Q	
36	Shani Anderson	Great Britain	6	1	5	11.55		
36	Esi Benyarku	Canada	10	6	4	11.55		
38	Sarah Reilly	Ireland	2	2	3	11.56	Q	
39	Joan Uduak Ekah	Nigeria	3	3	3	11.60	Q	
40	Natasha Laren Mayers	Saint Vincent and the Grenadines	2	6	4	11.61		
41	Marcia Richardson	Great Britain	2	5	4	11.62		
41	Heather Samuel	Antigua and Barbuda	5	4	4	11.62		
43	Mireille Donders	Switzerland	4	3	5	11.63		
43	Zeng Xiujun	China	10	4	5	11.63		
45	Ameerah Bello	Virgin Islands	8	1	5	11.64		
46	Kadiatou Camara	Mali	10	1	6	11.65		NR
46	Aminata Diouf	Senegal	2	3	5	11.65		
46	Paraskevi Patoulidou	Greece	7	6	5	11.65		
49	Heidi Hannula	Finland	4	4	6	11.68		
50	Viktoria Kovyreva	Kazakhstan	5	5	5	11.72		
51	Ayanna Hutchinson	Trinidad and Tobago	3	7	4	11.78		
52	Grace Dinkins	Liberia	8	3	6	11.79		
53	Martha Adusei	Canada	1	7	6	11.82		
53	Joanne Durant	Barbados	10	7	7	11.82		
55	Fana Ashby	Trinidad and Tobago	2	7	6	11.85		
56	Agnė Visockaitė	Lithuania	5	3	6	11.87		
57	Irene Truitje Joseph	Indonesia	9	8	6	11.93		
58	Joanna Hoareau	Seychelles	7	4	6	12.01		
59	Lerma Elmira Bulauitan	Philippines	3	6	5	12.08		
60	Vukosava Djapic	FR Yugoslavia	3	2	6	12.12		
61	Anais Oyembo	Gabon	8	8	7	12.19		SB
61	Ekundayo Williams	Sierra Leone	6	6	6	12.19		
63	Chen Shu-chuan	Chinese Taipei	9	1	7	12.22		
64	Emma Wade	Belize	3	5	7	12.25		PB
65	Laure Kuetey	Benin	6	8	7	12.40		
66	Akonga Nsimbo	Democratic Republic of the Congo	7	2	7	12.51		NR
67	Tamara Shanidze	Georgia	7	9	8	12.56		
67	Sarah Tonde	Burkina Faso	9	2	8	12.56		
69	Suzanne Spiteri	Malta	6	2	8	12.57		
70	Peoria Koshiba	Palau	2	4	7	12.66		NR
71	Devi Maya Paneru	Nepal	5	7	7	12.74		
72	Foujia Huda	Bangladesh	5	9	8	12.75		
73	M'Mah Toure	Guinea	6	1	9	12.82		
74	Shamha Ahmed	Maldives	6	9	9	12.87		
75	Mari Paz Mosana Motanga	Equatorial Guinea	1	2	7	12.91		
76	Luz Marina Geerman	Aruba	3	4	8	12.96		
77	Lina Bejjani	Lebanon	4	7	7	12.98		
78	Isménia do Frederico	Cape Verde	1	8	8	12.99		
79	Jenny Keni	Solomon Islands	2	5	8	13.01		
80	Sandjema Batouli	Comoros	9	9	9	13.58		
81	Fatou Dieng	Mauritania	7	7	9	13.69		
81	Regina Shotaro	Federated States of Micronesia	4	2	8	13.69		
83	Mariam Mohamed Hadi Al Hilli	Bahrain	8	6	8	13.98		SB
84	Chan Than Ouk	Cambodia	10	2	8	14.13		

=== Overall results for quarterfinals ===
Rank	Athlete	Nation	Heat	Lane	Place	Time	Qual.	Record
1	Marion Jones	United States	2	3	1	10.83	Q	
2	Ekaterini Thanou	Greece	2	4	2	10.99	Q	
3	Merlene Ottey	Jamaica	1	4	1	11.08	Q	
3	Zhanna Pintusevych	Ukraine	10	8	2	11.14	Q	
5	Sevatheda Fynes	Bahamas	4	4	1	11.10	Q	
6	Tayna Lawrence	Jamaica	2	6	3	11.11	Q	
7	Debbie Ferguson	Bahamas	1	5	2	11.18	Q	
8	Vida Nsiah	Ghana	4	1	2	11.19	Q	
9	Chryste Gaines	United States	3	6	2	11.21	Q	
10	Chandra Sturrup	Bahamas	3	4	3	11.22	Q	
11	Susanthika Jayasinghe	Sri Lanka	4	5	4	11.23	Q	
11	Leonie Mani	Cameroon	4	3	3	11.23	Q	
13	Melinda Gainsford-Taylor	Australia	2	1	4	11.24	Q	SB
14	Christine Arron	France	1	3	4	11.26	Q	
14	Beverly McDonald	Jamaica	3	5	4	11.26	Q	
14	Mercy Nku	Nigeria	1	2	3	11.26	Q	
17	Torri Edwards	United States	1	7	5	11.32		
17	Anzhela Kravchenko	Ukraine	1	6	6	11.32		
19	Petya Pendareva	Bulgaria	2	5	5	11.36		
20	Mary Onyali-Omagbemi	Nigeria	3	7	5	11.40		
21	Li Xuemei	China	4	6	5	11.46		
22	Natalya Ignatova	Russia	4	8	6	11.47		
23	Hanitriniaina Rakotondrabe	Madagascar	2	2	6	11.51		
24	Sarah Reilly	Ireland	4	7	7	11.53		
25	Lauren Hewitt	Australia	3	1	6	11.54		
25	Iryna Pukha	Ukraine	2	7	7	11.54		
27	Lyubov Perepelova	Uzbekistan	4	2	8	11.59		
28	Valma Bass	Saint Kitts and Nevis	3	8	7	11.60		
29	Sandra Citte	France	3	2	8	11.63		
30	Joan Uduak Ekah	Nigeria	2	8	8	11.67		
31	Monica Afia Twum	Ghana	1	8	7	11.70		
32	Cydonie Mothersill	Cayman Islands	1	1	8	11.81		

=== Overall results for semifinals ===
Rank	Athlete	Nation	Heat	Lane	Place	Time	Qual.	Record
DSQ	Marion Jones	United States	2	5	1	~~11.01~~	Q	
1	Ekaterini Thanou	Greece	2	3	2	11.10	Q	
2	Tayna Lawrence	Jamaica	2	2	3	11.12	Q	
3	Sevatheda Fynes	Bahamas	2	6	4	11.16	Q	
4	Merlene Ottey	Jamaica	1	4	1	11.22	Q	
5	Chryste Gaines	United States	2	4	5	11.23		
6	Chandra Sturrup	Bahamas	1	7	2	11.31	Q	
6	Beverly McDonald	Jamaica	2	7	6	11.31		
8	Zhanna Pintusevych	Ukraine	1	5	3	11.32	Q	
9	Susanthika Jayasinghe	Sri Lanka	2	1	7	11.33		
10	Debbie Ferguson	Bahamas	1	3	4	11.34	Q	
11	Vida Nsiah	Ghana	1	6	5	11.37		
12	Leonie Mani	Cameroon	1	2	6	11.40		
13	Christine Arron	France	1	8	7	11.42		
14	Melinda Gainsford-Taylor	Australia	1	1	8	11.45		
15	Mercy Nku	Nigeria	2	8	8	11.56		

== See also ==
- 1998 European Athletics Championships – Women's 100 metres
- 1999 World Championships in Athletics – Women's 100 metres
- 2001 World Championships in Athletics – Women's 100 metres
- 2002 European Athletics Championships – Women's 100 metres
