= Alain Bejjani =

Lebanese businessman

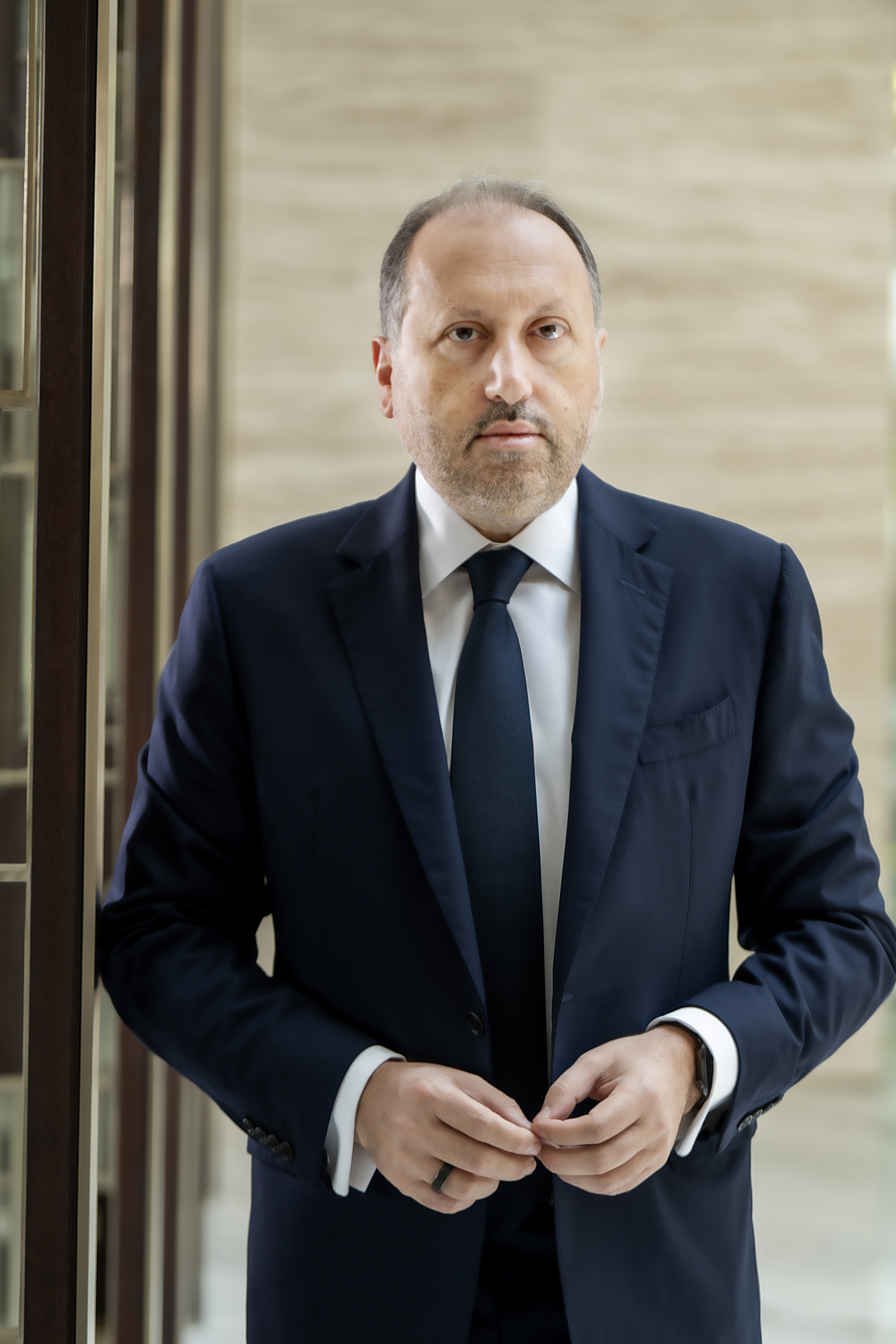
- Bejjani 2026
- Born: 1973 (age 52–53); Beirut, Lebanon
- Citizenship: Lebanese
- Website: https://alainbejjani.com/

Alain Bejjani is a Lebanese business executive and investor. He was chief executive officer (CEO) of Majid Al Futtaim Holding.

== Early life and education ==
Bejjani was born in Beirut, Lebanon, in 1973. He attended Collège Notre‑Dame de Jamhour in Beirut and later studied abroad in France at Lycée Champlain in Paris. Bejjani earned a Bachelor’s in Civil Law and a Master’s in Civil and Corporate Law from Université Paris XII in 1994. He also completed a Master’s in Lebanese Law from Lebanese Law University in 1995 and was admitted to the bar in Lebanon in 1997.

== Career ==
Bejjani began his career in law as a founding partner of the Lebanese firm Melkane, Rached, Bejjani & Associates, where he practiced from 1999 to 2006. During this period, he also was Executive Vice Chairman of the Investment Development Authority of Lebanon (IDAL) between 2001 and 2005.

In 2006, Bejjani joined Majid Al Futtaim Group as Vice President of Legal. He later advanced to Head of Business Development for Majid Al Futtaim Properties in 2009, overseeing acquisitions and expansion projects. By 2014, he was appointed Chief Corporate Development Officer and Brand Officer. In February 2015, he was appointed chief executive officer of Majid Al Futtaim Holding, and in 2023, he was replaced with Ismail. In 2025, Bejjani joined the panel of investors (“sharks”) on Shark Tank Lebanon.

== Honors and recognition ==
- Ranked number 2 in Forbes Middle East’s list of the 50 Most Influential Expats in the UAE (2018)
- listed in the BOF 500, an index of influancial people in the global fashion industry published by the Business of Fashion (2017, 2018)

== Bibliography ==
- Bejjani, Alain (2026). NEXT: Leading Through the New Realities. London: Whitefox Publishing.ISBN 978-1918191691

== Personal life ==
Bejjani has two children
