= Mireille Gigandet-Donders =

Swiss sprinter

Personal information
- Born: 7 July 1974 (age 52) Bern, Switzerland

Sport
- Sport: Track and field
Medal record
Representing Switzerland
Summer Universiade
Bronze medal – third place	2001 Beijing	100m

Mireille Gigandet-Donders (née Donders; born 7 July 1974) is a retired Swiss athlete who specialised in sprinting events. She represented her country at the 1996 and 2000 Summer Olympics without reaching the second round. She won the bronze medal in the 100 metres at the 2001 Summer Universiade.

She broke the Swiss record in several events. Her record in the indoor 200 metres is still standing.

== Competition record ==
Year	Competition	Venue	Position	Event	Notes
Representing Switzerland
1991	European Junior Championships	Thessaloniki, Greece	20th (h)	200 m	12.40
1992	World Junior Championships	Seoul, South Korea	28th (qf)	100 m	12.12
1992	World Junior Championships	Seoul, South Korea	21st (sf)	200 m	24.52
1993	European Junior Championships	San Sebastián, Spain	8th	200 m	23.98
1993	European Junior Championships	San Sebastián, Spain	7th	4 × 100 m relay	46.06
1994	European Indoor Championships	Paris, France	11th (sf)	200 m	24.38
1994	European Championships	Helsinki, Finland	23rd (h)	200 m	23.97
1994	European Championships	Helsinki, Finland	9th (h)	4 × 100 m relay	44.43
1996	European Indoor Championships	Stockholm, Sweden	12th (sf)	60 m	7.46
1996	European Indoor Championships	Stockholm, Sweden	9th (sf)	200 m	24.13
1996	Olympic Games	Atlanta, United States	38th (h)	100 m	11.67
1996	Olympic Games	Atlanta, United States	25th (h)	200 m	23.52
1997	World Indoor Championships	Paris, France	7th (sf)	200 m	23.30
1997	Universiade	Catania, Italy	7th	100 m	11.65
1997	Universiade	Catania, Italy	7th	200 m	23.74
1997	Universiade	Catania, Italy	9th (h)	4 × 400 m relay	3:41.45
1998	European Indoor Championships	Valencia, Spain	4th (h)	200 m	22.96
1999	Universiade	Palma de Mallorca, Spain	7th	100 m	11.55
1999	Universiade	Palma de Mallorca, Spain	7th	200 m	23.83
2000	European Indoor Championships	Ghent, Belgium	8th (sf)	200 m	23.47
2000	Olympic Games	Sydney, Australia	43rd (h)	100 m	11.63
2000	Olympic Games	Sydney, Australia	33rd (h)	200 m	23.44
2001	Universiade	Beijing, China	3rd	100 m	11.59
2001	Universiade	Beijing, China	4th	200 m	23.31

== Personal bests ==
Outdoor

- 100 metres – 11.34 (+0.8 m/s) (Geneva 2001) former NR
- 200 metres – 23.06 (+1.2 m/s) (Lugano 2000)

Indoor

- 60 metres – 7.27 (Magglingen 1998) former NR
- 200 metres – 22.96 (Valencia 1998) former NR
