= Esi Benyarku =

Canadian sprinter

Personal information
- Nationality: Canadian
- Born: 28 November 1976 (age 49) Tema, Ghana

Sport
- Sport: Sprinting
- Event: 100 metres

Esi Benyarku (born 28 November 1976) is a Canadian sprinter. She competed in the women's 100 metres at the 2000 Summer Olympics.

Benyarku was an All-American sprinter for the USC Trojans track and field team, anchoring their runner-up 4 × 100 meters relay at the 1999 NCAA Division I Outdoor Track and Field Championships.
