= Yekaterina Grigoryeva =

Russian sprinter (born 1974)

Personal information
- Born: April 21, 1974 (age 52) Volgograd, Soviet Union

Sport
- Sport: Track and field
Medal record
Representing Russia
Summer Universiade
| Gold medal – first place | 1997 Catania | 200m |
| Silver medal – second place | 1997 Catania | 4x100m relay |
European Championships
| Gold medal – first place | 2006 Gothenburg | 4x100m relay |
| Silver medal – second place | 1994 Helsinki | 4x100m relay |
| Silver medal – second place | 2006 Gothenburg | 200m |
European Indoor Championships
| Bronze medal – third place | 2000 Ghent | 200m |

Yekaterina Grigoryeva, née Yekaterina Leshcheva, (Russian: Екатерина Григорьева; born April 21, 1974) is a Russian sprint athlete. She became the Summer Universiade champion in the 200 metres at the 1997 Summer Universiade. She reached the European podium at the 2000 European Athletics Indoor Championships, taking the bronze medal in the women's 200 m. She was given a two-year ban from competition in 2001.

== International competitions ==
| Year | Competition | Venue | Position | Event | Notes |
Representing the Commonwealth of Independent States
| 1992 | World Junior Championships | Seoul, South Korea | — | 4 × 100 m relay | DNF |
| 1992 | World Junior Championships | Seoul, South Korea | 8th | 4 × 400 m relay | 3:39.76 |
Representing Russia
| 1994 | European Championships | Helsinki, Finland | 10th (semis) | 200 m | 23.36 (wind: 0.3 m/s) |
| 1995 | World Indoor Championships | Barcelona, Spain | 5th (semis) | 60 m | 7.27 |
| 1995 | World Championships | Gothenburg, Sweden | 8th (semis) | 100 m | 11.34 |
| 1996 | Olympic Games | Atlanta, Georgia, United States | 4th | 4 × 100 m relay | 42.27 |
| 1997 | Summer Universiade | Catania, Italy | 1st | 200 metres | 23.18 |
| 1997 | World Championships | Athens, Greece | 4th | 200 m | 22.50 |
| 1997 | World Championships | Athens, Greece | 5th | 4 × 100 m relay | 42.50 |
| 1998 | Goodwill Games | Uniondale, New York, United States | 8th | 200 m | 23.33 |
| 1998 | Goodwill Games | Uniondale, New York, United States | 3rd | 4 × 100 m relay | 42.62 |
| 2000 | European Indoor Championships | Ghent, Belgium | 3rd | 200 m | 23.20 |
| 2001 | World Championships | Edmonton, Canada | DQ | 200 m | |
| 2005 | European Indoor Championships | Madrid, Spain | 10th (semis) | 60 m | 7.32 |
| 2006 | European Championships | Gothenburg, Sweden | 2nd | 100 metres | 11.22 |
| 2006 | European Championships | Gothenburg, Sweden | 1st | 4 × 100 m relay | 42.71 |
| 2006 | IAAF World Cup | Athens, Greece | 2nd | 4 × 100 m relay | 42.36 |
| 2007 | World Championships | Osaka, Japan | 7th (q-finals) | 100 m | 11.49 |

== See also ==
- List of doping cases in athletics
