= Jacqueline Poelman =

Dutch sprinter

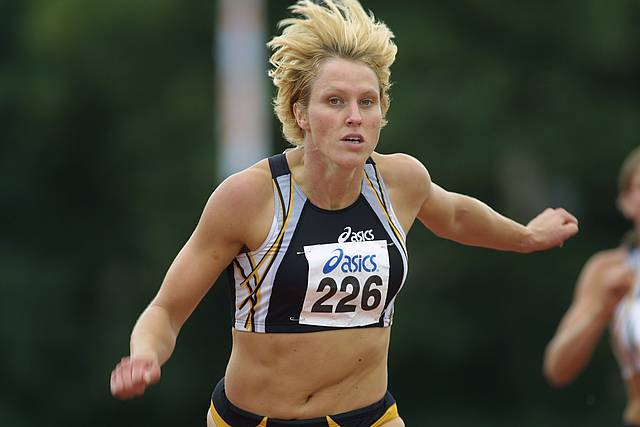

Personal information
- Full name: Helina Jacomina Poelman
- Born: 5 October 1973 (age 52) Leek, Netherlands
- Years active: 1984-2006
- Height: 1.71 m (5 ft 7 in)
- Weight: 63 kg (139 lb)

Achievements and titles
- Personal bests: 100 m - 11.27 (1994); 200 m - 23.00 (2002); 400 m - 52.84 (2001)
Medal record
Women's athletics
World Championships
Silver medal – second place	1992 Junior	100 m
European Championships
Bronze medal – third place	1994 Paris - Indoor	200 m
Bronze medal – third place	2005 - Indoor	200 m
- Updated on 20 March 2008

Helina Jacomina (Jacqueline) Poelman (October 5, 1973) is a former Dutch sprinter.

Poelman was born and raised in Leek and trained at an athletics club in Roden. Her first major international tournament were the 1991 European Junior Championships in Thessaloniki, where she did not reach the final on the 100 nor the 200 m. Only a year later at the World Junior Championships she won the silver medal on the 100 m, finishing second, while she became fourth on the 200 m. In the same year, she was part of the Dutch 4 × 100 m relay team during the Olympics in Barcelona, which was eliminated in the series.

Poelman won the bronze medal in the 200 m at the 1994 European Championships, held in Paris. For a long time, this was her last international achievement.

Only in 2002 Poelman worked on her comeback after a few years without hardly any competition, because she finished her study. At the European Championships however, she reached the seventh position on the 200 m. In 2003 Jacqueline Poelman was a member of the Dutch 4 × 100 m relay team that participated in the World Championships in Paris. Together with Joan van den Akker, Pascal van Assendelft and Annemarie Kramer the team nominated itself for the 2004 Summer Olympics, realising the twelfth time out of twenty teams in competition. It is true the final remained beyond reach, but the Dutch four set a season's fastest time, scoring 43.96.

During the Olympic Games in Athens in 2004 she was again part of the same Dutch 4 × 100 m relay team. Unfortunately, they did not finish, because of a disqualification after a wrong baton change. A year later at the European Indoor Championships she won another bronze medal on the 200 m.

On 3 September 2006, Poelman ran her last race at the Arena Games in Hilversum.

== Personal bests ==
Outdoor

- 100 metres – 11.27 (1994)
- 200 metres – 23.00 (2002)
- 400 metres – 52.84 (2001)

Indoor

- 60 metres – 7.26 (1994)
- 200 metres – 23.36 (1995)

== Bibliography ==
- Heere, Aad; Kappenburg, Bart (2000). 1870–2000, 130 jaar atletiek in Nederland. Landgraaf: Groenevelt b.v. ISBN 90-901286-7-0.
- Bijkerk, Ton (2004). Olympisch Oranje. Haarlem: De Vrieseborch. ISBN 90-6076-522-2.
- Werkgroep Statistiek KNAU (2006). Statistisch jaarboek 2006. Arnhem: KNAU.

Awards
Preceded by Letitia Vriesde	KNAU Cup; 2002	Succeeded by Lornah Kiplagat
