= Julia Alba =

Spanish sprinter

Personal information
- Born: May 30, 1972 (age 54) Seville, Spain

Sport
- Sport: Track and field
Medal record
Representing Spain
Mediterranean Games
Gold medal – first place	2005 Almeria	4x400m relay

Julia María Alba Alarcó (born May 30, 1972) is a retired Spanish sprinter.

Alba was born in Seville. She finished ninth in the 200 metres in the 2002 IAAF World Cup, and competed at the 1999 World Championships without reaching the final. She also competed in 400 metres at the 2001 World Championships.

Alba has 23.56 seconds in the 200 metres, achieved at the 1999 World Championships in Seville; 52.28 seconds in the 400 metres, achieved in July 2001 in Madrid; and 11.78 seconds in the 100 metres, achieved in August 1999 in Monachil.
