= Monika Gachevska =

Bulgarian sprinter (born 1974)

Personal information
- Born: 30 January 1974 (age 52) Pleven, Bulgaria
- Height: 1.74 m (5 ft 9 in)
- Weight: 57 kg (126 lb)

Sport
- Sport: Track and field
- Event: 200 metres
- Club: Spartak Pleven
Medal record
Representing Bulgaria
Summer Universiade
Bronze medal – third place	1997 Catania	200 m

Monika Georgieva Gachevska (Bulgarian: Моника Георгиева Гачевска; born 30 January 1974 in Pleven) is a retired Bulgarian athlete who competed in the sprinting events. She represented her country at three consecutive Olympic Games, starting in 1996, as well as three outdoor and three indoor World Championships. Her biggest achievement is the bronze medal secured at the 1997 Summer Universiade.

== Competition record ==
Year	Competition	Venue	Position	Event	Notes
Representing Bulgaria
1992	World Junior Championships	Seoul, South Korea	29th (h)	200 m	24.79
1995	Universiade	Fukuoka, Japan	7th	200 m	23.46
1995	Universiade	Fukuoka, Japan	20th (h)	400 m	55.86
1996	European Indoor Championships	Stockholm, Sweden	11th (sf)	200 m	24.22
1996	Olympic Games	Atlanta, United States	22nd (qf)	200 m	23.44
1996	Olympic Games	Atlanta, United States	10th (h)	4 × 100 m relay	44.19
1997	World Indoor Championships	Paris, France	16th (sf)	200 m	24.47
1997	World Championships	Athens, Greece	36th (h)	200 m	23.55
1997	Universiade	Catania, Italy	3rd	200 m	23.60
1998	European Indoor Championships	Valencia, Spain	12th (sf)	200 m	24.03
1998	European Championships	Budapest, Hungary	15th (h)	200 m	23.50
1999	World Indoor Championships	Maebashi, Japan	–	200 m	DNF
1999	Universiade	Palma de Mallorca, Spain	35th (h)	100 m	12.87
2000	Olympic Games	Sydney, Australia	47th (h)	200 m	24.16
2002	European Championships	Munich, Germany	18th (h)	200 m	23.62
2003	World Championships	Paris, France	17th (h)	4 × 400 m relay	3:33.92
2004	Olympic Games	Athens, Greece	38th (h)	200 m	23.71
2005	World Championships	Helsinki, Finland	13th (h)	4 × 400 m relay	3:38.96
2006	World Indoor Championships	Moscow, Russia	7th (h)	4 × 400 m relay	3:34.47
2006	European Championships	Gothenburg, Sweden	26th (h)	200 m	24.53
2006	European Championships	Gothenburg, Sweden	8th	4 × 400 m relay	3:33.75
2010	European Championships	Barcelona, Spain	15th (h)	4 × 100 m relay	44.72

== Personal bests ==
Outdoor

- 100 metres – 11.36 (+1.7 m/s) (Sofia 2002)
- 200 metres – 22.73 (+0.9 m/s) (Sofia 2004)
- 400 metres – 53.20 (Sofia 2004)

Indoor

- 60 metres – 7.32 (Budapest 1998)
- 200 metres – 23.43 (Budapest 1999)
