= Natallia Safronnikava =

Belarusian sprinter

Personal information
- Born: 28 February 1973 (age 53) Vawkavysk, Soviet Union

Sport
- Sport: Track and field
Medal record
Representing Belarus
World Indoor Championships
Gold medal – first place	2004 Budapest	200m
Bronze medal – third place	2001 Lisbon	200m
European Championships
Bronze medal – third place	2006 Gothenburg	200m
Summer Universiade
Bronze medal – third place	2001 Beijing	200m
Bronze medal – third place	2001 Beijing	4x400m relay

Natallia Safronnikava (Belarusian: Натальля Сафроньнікава), née Vinogradova (born 28 February 1973) is a retired Belarusian sprinter, who mainly competed in the 200 metres.

Safronnikava won her first international medal (a bronze) at the 2001 IAAF World Indoor Championships, and won a gold medal in 2004 - Anastasiya Kapachinskaya of Russia originally finished first, but was disqualified after she tested positive for the anabolic steroid stanozolol.

Safronnikava's winning time of 23.13 seconds was the slowest the title had been won in, and as the event has not been contested since, she is the most recent champion as of 2021.

She retired from international athletics in June 2010.

== Achievements ==
Year	Competition	Venue	Position	Notes
Representing Belarus
1995	World Championships	Gothenburg, Sweden	5th (heats)	200 m
1997	World Championships	Athens, Greece	6th (heats)	200 m
1999	World Indoor Championships	Maebashi, Japan	4th (heats)	60 m
1999	World Championships	Seville, Spain	8th (semis)	100 m
1999	World Championships	Seville, Spain	7th (semis)	200 m
2001	World Indoor Championships	Lisbon, Portugal	6th (semis)	60 m
2001	World Indoor Championships	Lisbon, Portugal	3rd	200 m
2001	World Championships	Edmonton, Canada	4th (quarter-finals)	100 m
2001	World Championships	Edmonton, Canada	6th (semis)	200 m
2001	Universiade	Beijing, China	3rd	200 m
2002	European Championships	Munich, Germany	6th (heats)	200 m
2002	European Championships	Munich, Germany	8th	4 × 100 m relay
2003	World Indoor Championships	Birmingham, England	5th	200 m
2003	World Championships	Paris, France	6th	200 m
2003	World Championships	Paris, France	6th	4 × 100 m relay
2003	World Athletics Final	Monte Carlo, Monaco	5th	200 m
2004	World Indoor Championships	Budapest, Hungary	8th	60 m
2004	World Indoor Championships	Budapest, Hungary	1st	200 m
2004	Olympic Games	Athens, Greece	8th (quarter-finals)	200 m
2004	Olympic Games	Athens, Greece	5th	4 × 100 m relay, 42.94 s NR
2005	European Indoor Championships	Madrid, Spain	6th	Triple jump, 14.31 m PB
2006	European Championships	Gothenburg, Sweden	3rd	4 × 100 m relay

== Personal bests ==
- 60 metres - 7.04 s (2001, indoor)
- 100 metres - 11.05 s (2003)
- 200 metres - 22.68 s (2001)
- Triple jump - 14.31 m (2006, indoor)
