= Lina Bejjani =

Lebanese sprinter (born 1984)

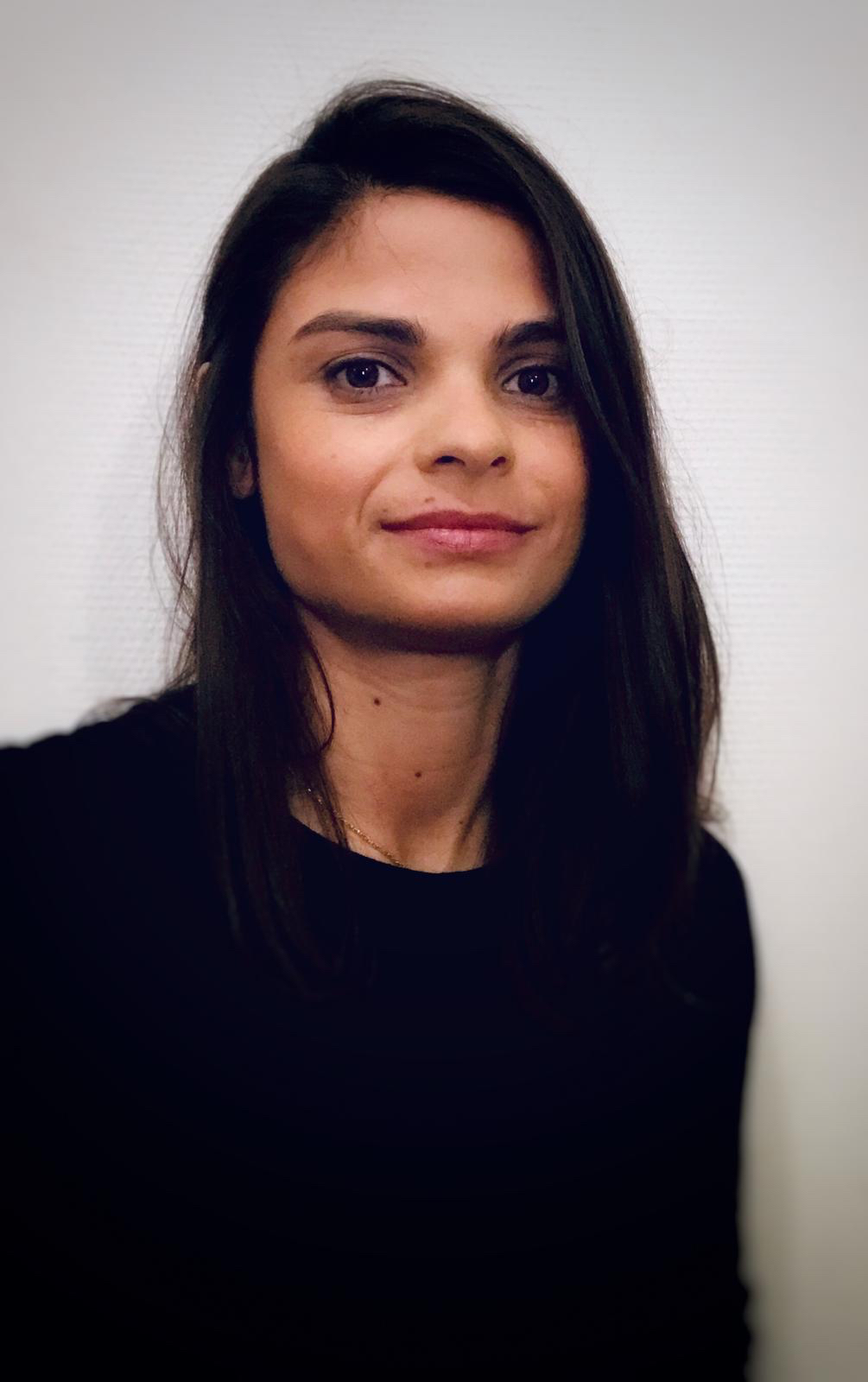

Personal information
- Nationality: Lebanese
- Born: 29 August 1984 (age 41)

Sport
- Sport: Sprinting
- Event: 100 metres

Lina Bejjani (born 29 August 1984) is a Lebanese sprinter. She competed in the women's 100 metres at the 2000 Summer Olympics, and was eliminated after coming in 7th in her heat in round one.
