= Shanta Ghosh =

German sprinter

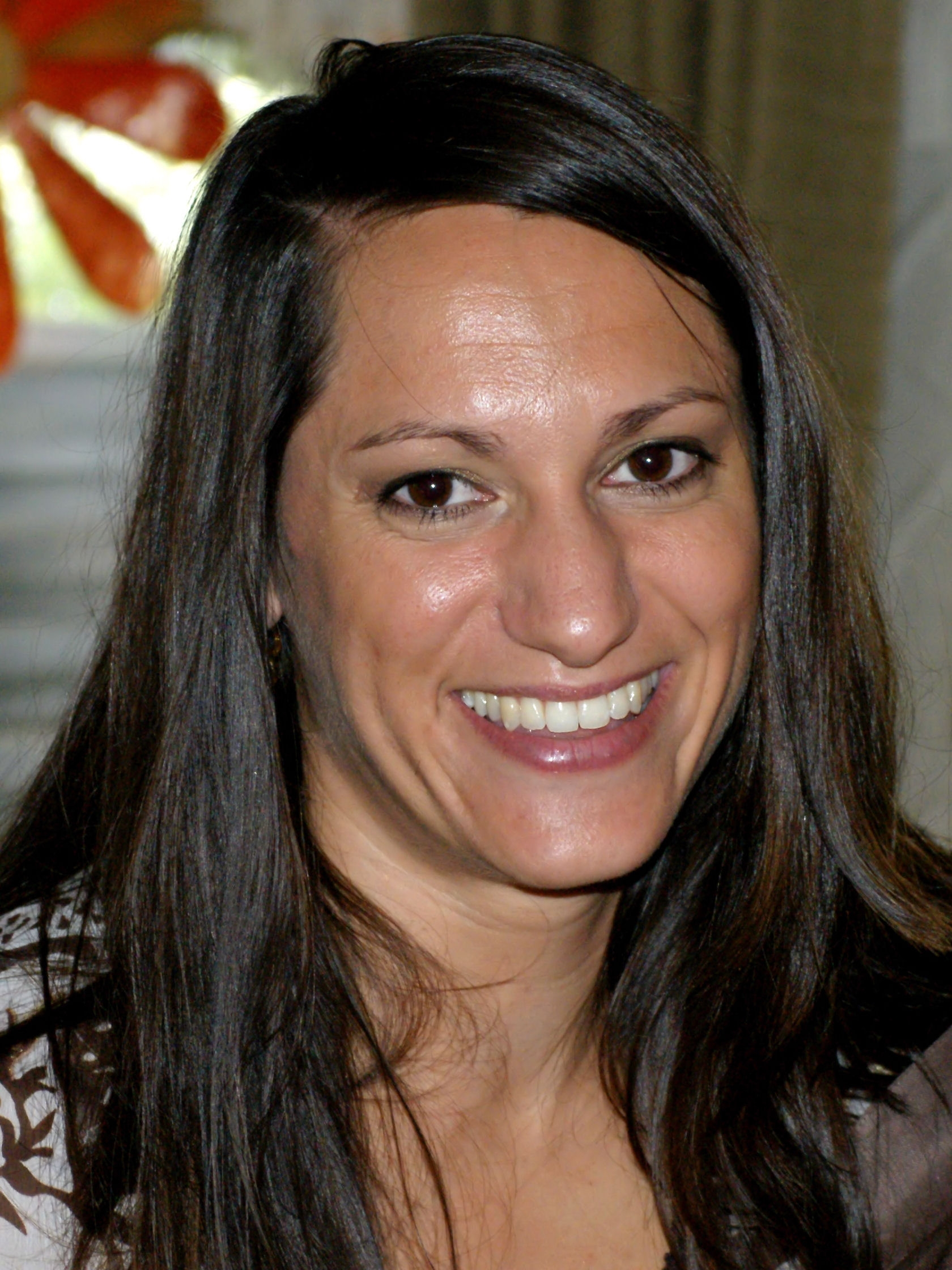
- Shanta Ghosh in 2008

Personal information
- Born: January 3, 1975 (age 51) Neunkirchen, Saarland, West Germany

Sport
- Country: Germany
- Sport: Athletics
- Event: 4 × 400m relay
Medal record
Representing Germany
World Championships
Silver medal – second place	2001 Edmonton	4x400m relay
World Indoor Championships
Bronze medal – third place	2001 Lisbon	4x400m relay
Summer Universiade
Bronze medal – third place	1999 Palma de Mallorca	4x100m relay
European U23 Championships
Gold medal – first place	1997 Turku	4x100m relay
Silver medal – second place	1997 Turku	200m
Silver medal – second place	1997 Turku	4x400m relay

Arnoldine Shanta Ghosh-Broderius (born 3 January 1975) is a retired German sprinter who specialized in the 400 metres.

== Achievements ==
Year	Competition	Venue	Position	Event	Notes
Representing Germany
1997	European U23 Championships	Turku, Finland	2nd	200m	22.80 (wind: 1.7 m/s)
1997	European U23 Championships	Turku, Finland	1st	4 × 100 m relay	43.94
1997	European U23 Championships	Turku, Finland	2nd	4 × 400 m relay	3:33.77
2001	World Indoor Championships	Lisbon, Portugal	3rd	4 × 400 m relay	3:31.00
2001	World Championships	Edmonton, Canada	2nd	4 × 400 m relay	3:21.97

=== Personal bests ===
- 100 metres - 11.46 s (2000)
- 200 metres - 22.80 s (2000)
- 400 metres - 51.25 s (2001)
