= Annemarie Kramer =

Dutch sprinter (born 1975)

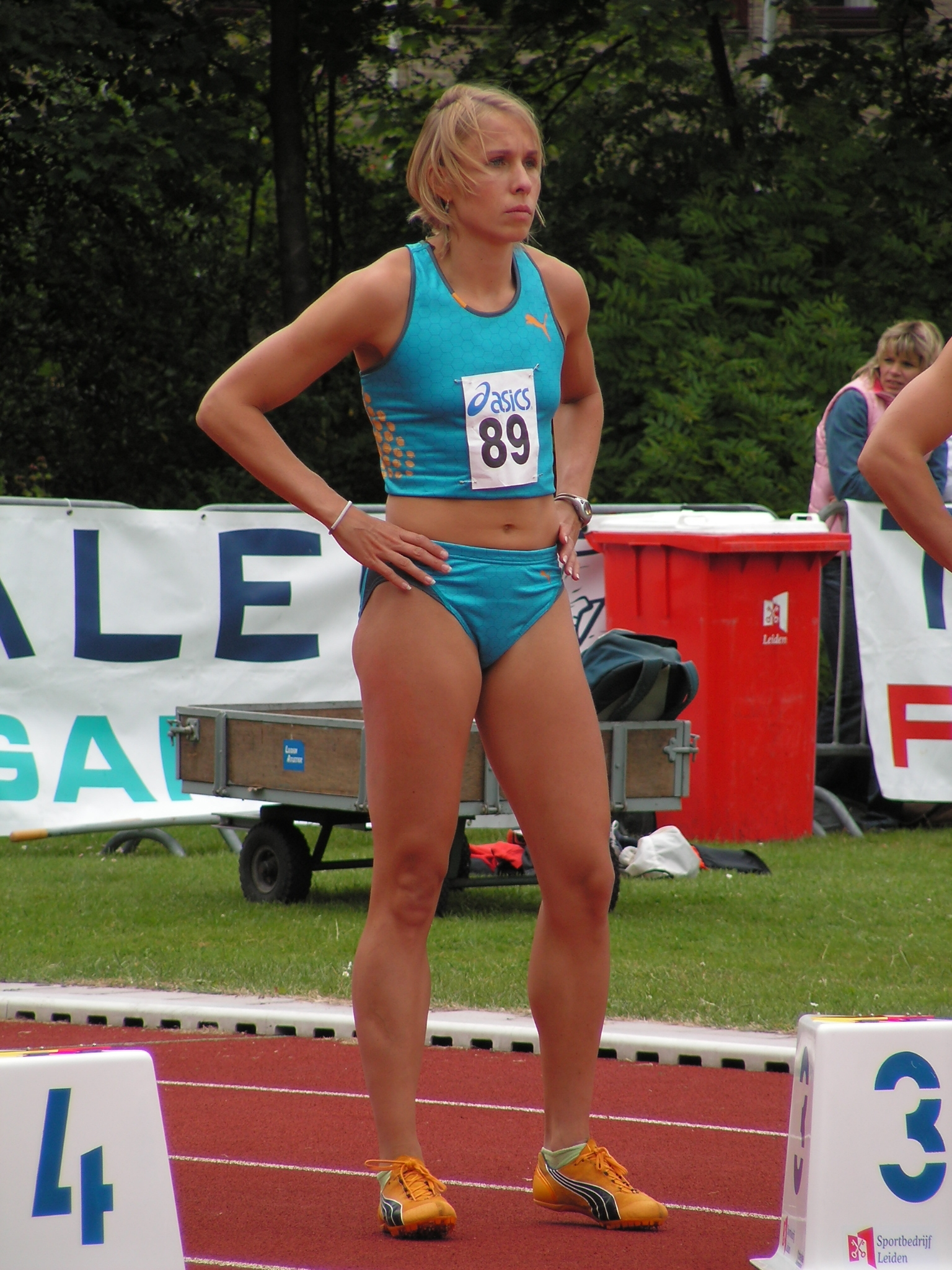
- Kramer in 2005

Personal information
- Full name: Anna Maria Kramer
- Born: 15 February 1975 (age 51) Haarlem, Netherlands
- Years active: 1987-2007
- Height: 1.69 m (5 ft 7 in)
- Weight: 61 kg (134 lb)

Achievements and titles
- Personal bests: 100m - 11.44 (1997); 200m - 23.24 (1997)
- Updated on 18 November 2008

Anna Maria 'Annemarie' Kramer (born 15 February 1975 in Haarlem) is a former Dutch sprinter. She started with athletics at the age of twelve and soon found out that she had a special talent for the sprinting events. She was a five-time Dutch sprinting champion.

In 2003 Annemarie Kramer participated in the World Championships in Paris as a member of the Dutch 4 x 100 metres relay team, together with Jacqueline Poelman, Pascal van Assendelft and Joan van den Akker. The team finished twelfth out of twenty teams in competition. The final remained beyond reach, but the Dutch four set a season's fastest time of 43.96 seconds.

The same relay team as in the preceding year participated at the Summer Olympics in Athens. They were however eliminated in the series after failing to correctly pass on the baton.

In May 2007, Annemarie Kramer announced that she had put a stop to her career in athletics in the meantime. She stated that she no longer had any realistic goal could give her the incentive to carry on. During all 2006 a former back injury had given her a lot of trouble. From then on, she intended to build up her social career.

== Personal bests ==
Outdoor

- 100 metres - 11.44 (1997)
- 200 metres - 23.24 (1997)

Indoor

- 60 metres - 7.43 (1997)
- 200 metres - 23.59 (1997)
