= LaTasha Jenkins =

American former track and field sprinter (born 1977)

Personal information
- Born: December 19, 1977 (age 48) Chicago, Illinois, United States

Sport
- Sport: Track and field
Medal record
Representing United States
World Championships
Silver medal – second place	2001 Edmonton	200 m
World Indoor Championships
Silver medal – second place	2001 Lisbon	200 m

LaTasha Jenkins (born December 19, 1977) is an American former track and field sprinter. Having won international medals in the 200 m, she won a silver medal at the 2001 World Indoor Championships and a silver medal at the 2001 Outdoor Championships. Other career highlights include 2001 U.S. Indoor 200m champion; 1999 and 2001 US Outdoor runner-up, 200m; 1998 she was an NCAA silver medalist in the 200 meter dash; 1999 NCAA 200m champion; four-time NCAA All-American; member of world record-holding 4 × 200 m relay team. She was born in Chicago and attended Oak Lawn Polaris High School. During her time as a Richards Bulldog, she placed 7th in the Illinois State Finals her Junior Year in 1994 and later went on to place 3rd in State her Senior year in 1995. She was MVP of the team and consistently All Conference. She was inducted into the Harold L. Richards Hall of Fame on 18-Oct-2026.

After winning the 1999 NCAA 200m title and finishing second to Marion Jones at the U.S. Championships, Jenkins was poised to make her mark on the international scene, but a collapsed lung she suffered on the flight to the 1999 World University Games forced her to with withdraw from that meet as well as the World Championships. She recovered in 2000 and in 2001 had terrific results under new coach Norbert Elliott in Georgia, winning her first U.S. title indoors and winning silver at the 2001 World Indoor Championships. She went on to finish runner-up to Jones outdoors at 200m and was fourth at the World Outdoor Championships. She graduated from Ball State University with a degree in English and a minor in counseling psychology. She scored 25 points at the Mid-American meet in 1998, and her 1999 NCAA crown was the first ever national championship for Ball State women's track & field.She was MVP of her team and a 4 time Mid American Conference Champion.

Jenkins holds a world record, as a member of the American 4 × 200 m relay team that ran 1:27.46 on April 29, 2000, in Philadelphia, Pennsylvania, the other team members being LaTasha Colander-Richardson, Nanceen Perry and Marion Jones. Note that 4 × 200 m is not a regular track event and not a part of the program for any major international championship.

Latasha Jenkins is the only athlete in history to win an anti-doping case against USADA. WADA agreed with the findings of the USADA verdict and dropped their appeal; exonerated of any and all charges.

Latasha Jenkins was inducted in the Ball State University Sports Hall of Fame in February 2010.

Sporting positions
Preceded by Marion Jones	Women's 200 m Season's Best Performance alongside Debbie Ferguson; 2001	Succeeded by Allyson Felix
