= Wan Kin Yee =

Hong Kong sprinter

Personal information
- Born: July 20, 1975 (age 51) Hong Kong

Sport
- Sport: Track and field
Medal record
Representing Hong Kong
East Asian Games
Bronze medal – third place	2005 Macau	200m
Bronze medal – third place	2005 Macau	4x100m relay
Bronze medal – third place	2009 Hong Kong	4x100m relay

Wan Kin Yee (Chinese: 溫健儀; Jyutping: wan^{1} gin^{6} ji^{4}; born July 20, 1975) is a track and field sprint athlete who competes internationally for Hong Kong.

Wan represented Hong Kong at the 2008 Summer Olympics in Beijing. She competed at the 100 metres sprint and placed sixth in her heat without advancing to the second round. She ran the distance in a time of 12.37 seconds.

She married fellow sprinter Pat Kwok Wai in 2002. She held the Hong Kong record for the women's 100 metres sprint from 1999 until February 2017, when it was broken by Chan Pui-kei (陳佩琦).
