= Katleen De Caluwé =

Belgian sprinter (born 1976)

Personal information
- Born: 22 December 1976 (age 49) Rumst, Antwerp Province, Belgium

Sport
- Sport: Track and field

Katleen De Caluwé (born 22 December 1976) is a Belgian sprinter, who specializes in the 100 metres. Her personal best time is 11.49 seconds, achieved in May 2002 in Oordegem.

De Caluwé finished sixth in 4 x 100 metres relay at the 2004 Summer Olympics, with teammates Lien Huyghebaert, Élodie Ouédraogo and Kim Gevaert. This team set a national record of 43.08 seconds in the heat.
