= Rahela Markt =

Croatian sprinter

Personal information
- Born: 1 March 1973 (age 53) Zagreb, Yugoslavia

Sport
- Sport: Track and field

Marisa Rahela Markt (born 1 March 1973) is a retired Croatian sprinter who specialized in the 100 metres.

She competed at the 1995 World Indoor Championships and the 1990 World Championships, but did not reach the final in either event. She became Croatian 100 metres champion in 1994, 1995, 1997, 1998, 1999, 2000 and 2001, and 200 metres champion in 1994, 1995, 1998 and 1999.

Her personal best time was 11.58 seconds, achieved in September 1998 in Biella, Italy. Her 60 metres personal best of 7.46 seconds, set in February 2001, was a national record until 2008.
