= Manuela Grillo =

Italian sprinter (born 1977)

Personal information
- Nationality: Italian
- Born: 9 May 1977 (age 49) Pavia, Italy

Sport
- Country: Italy
- Sport: Athletics
- Event: Sprint
- Club: G.S. Forestale
- Coached by: Andrea Nuti

Achievements and titles
- Personal bests: 100 m: 11.50 (1997); 200 m: 23.78 (2000); 400 m: 54.88 (2007); 60 m indoor: 7.41 (2001); 200 m indoor: 24.06 (2001)
Medal record
Mediterranean Games
| Silver medal – second place | 2001 Tunis | 4x100 metres relay |
| Bronze medal – third place | 2005 Almeria | 4x100 metres relay |
European Cup
| Bronze medal – third place | 2005 Florence | 4x100 metres relay |
European U23 Championships
| Bronze medal – third place | 1997 Turku | 4x100 metres relay |

Manuela Grillo (born 9 May 1977 in Pavia) is a former Italian sprinter.

She won three medals, at the senior level, with the national relay team at the International athletics competitions.

== Biography ==
Manuela Grillo also participated, at an individual level, at one edition of the IAAF World Indoor Championships in Athletics (2001). She has 22 caps in the national team from 1995 to 2007.

In 2011, after her athlete career, she is dedicated to cycling, touching, but not reaching, the qualification to the 2012 Summer Olympics.

== Achievements ==
| Year | Competition | Venue | Position | Event | Notes |
Representing Italy
| 1996 | World Junior Championships | Sydney, Australia | 34th (h) | 200m | 24.80 (wind: -0.3 m/s) |
| 1996 | World Junior Championships | Sydney, Australia | 5th | 4 × 100 m relay | 45.27 |
| 1997 | European U23 Championships | Turku, Finland | 14th (h) | 200m | 24.70 (wind: 1.9 m/s) |
| 1997 | European U23 Championships | Turku, Finland | 3rd | 4 × 100 m relay | 44.73 |
| 1999 | European U23 Championships | Gothenburg, Sweden | 16th (h) | 100m | 11.89 (wind: -0.2 m/s) |
| 2001 | World Indoor Championships | Lisbon, Portugal | Heat | 60 metres | 7.59 |

== National titles ==
Manuela Grillo has won two times the individual national championship.

- 2 wins in the 60 metres indoor (2001, 2006)

== See also ==
- Italy national relay team
- Italian all-time lists - 4x100 metres relay
