= Katia Benth =

French sprinter

Personal information
- Full name: Katia Benth
- Born: 16 November 1975 Cayenne, French Guiana

Sport
- Sport: Athletics
Medal record
Women's athletics
Representing France
World Championships
Silver medal – second place	1999 Seville	4 × 100 m relay
European Championships
Gold medal – first place	1998 Budapest	4×100 m relay
Summer Universiade
Silver medal – second place	1997 Catania	200 m
Silver medal – second place	1999 Palma de Mallorca	100 m
Bronze medal – third place	1997 Catania	100 m
Bronze medal – third place	2001 Beijing	4 x 100 m relay
Representing French Guiana
Central American and Caribbean Championships
Gold medal – first place	1999 Bridgetown	100 m
Gold medal – first place	1999 Bridgetown	200 m

Katia Benth (born 16 November 1975) is a French retired sprinter. Born in French Guiana, she started athletics at the age of 12. She later competed in and for France, becoming the French university-level national champion in the women's 100 and 200 metres on multiple occasions. During her career, she has won medals for France at the World Championships and European Championships. Representing French Guiana, she won two gold medals at the 1999 Central American and Caribbean Championships in Athletics. In her later life, she became a marine for the French army and a coach.

== Biography ==
Katia Benth was born on 16 February 1975 in Cayenne, French Guiana. She was the youngest in a family of four siblings. Her athletics talent was discovered by her uncle and thus she started the sport at the age of twelve.

She started her senior level athletics career in 1996. During that time, she became the French university-level national champion and French junior champion in both the women's 100 and 200 metres. She then started her international career the following year competing for France but first became the French university-level national champion and French indoor champion in the women's 100 and 200 metres. At the 1997 European Athletics U23 Championships, she won the bronze medal in the women's 200 metres with a time of 23.19 seconds. She then competed in the women's 200 metres at the 1997 World Championships in Athletics held in August, reaching the quarterfinals. A few weeks later, she won a silver medal in the 200 metres and bronze in the 100 metres at the 1997 Summer Universiade.

In 1998, she won her first and only European Athletics Championships medal, doing so at the 1998 European Athletics Championships. With her teammates, they won the gold medal in the women's 4 × 100 m relay. In the same year, Benth was the silver medalist in the women's 200 metres at the French national championships and French indoor championships. She had more success in the following year, becoming the French university-level national championships gold medalist in the 100 metres and silver medalist in the 200 metres. She also became the French national champion in the women's 100 metres and silver medalist in the women's 200 metres. At the 1999 Summer Universiade, she earned her first gold medal at the Universiade, doing so in the 100 metres. The following month, with her teammates they became the silver medalist in the women's 4 × 100 m relay at the 1999 World Championships in Athletics, her only World Championships medal. She was also a quarterfinalist in the women's 100 metres.

Representing French Guiana, she became the women's 100 metres and 200 metres gold medalist at the 1999 Central American and Caribbean Championships in Athletics. She continued to represent France internationally until 2004 for her retirement. After her career, she became a marine in the 9th Marine Infantry Regiment, a teacher, and worked for the French Ministry of Youth and Sports.

In 2019, she had a part of her left leg that had to be amputated after a blood problem occurred in the foot. Later in her career, she became a coach for athletes such as Olympian Gémima Joseph.
