= 2003 IAAF World Indoor Championships – Women's 200 metres =

The women's 200 metres event at the 2003 IAAF World Indoor Championships was held on March 14–15.

== Medalists ==
Gold	Silver	Bronze
Muriel Hurtis-Houairi; France	Anastasiya Kapachinskaya; Russia	Juliet Campbell; Jamaica

Note: Michelle Collins of the USA originally won the gold medal but lost it due to a doping case.

== Results ==
=== Heats ===
First 2 of each heat (Q) qualified directly for the semifinals.

Rank	Heat	Name	Nationality	Time	Notes
1	1	Muriel Hurtis-Houairi	France	22.75	Q
2	2	Anastasiya Kapachinskaya	Russia	22.80	Q
DQ	6	Michelle Collins	United States	~~23.01~~	Q, Doping
3	5	Juliet Campbell	Jamaica	23.12	Q
4	3	Cydonie Mothersill	Cayman Islands	23.16	Q
5	4	Natallia Safronnikava	Belarus	23.26	Q
6	2	Maryna Maydanova	Ukraine	23.30	Q
7	3	Allyson Felix	United States	23.36	Q
8	4	Manuela Levorato	Italy	23.46	Q
9	6	Ciara Sheehy	Ireland	23.46	Q
10	4	Lucia Ivanová	Slovakia	23.47	NR
11	5	Yuliya Tabakova	Russia	23.58	Q
12	1	Amy Spencer	Great Britain	23.59	Q
13	1	Daniela Graglia	Italy	23.66	
14	3	Olena Pastushenko-Sinyavina	Ukraine	23.80	
15	6	Solen Désert-Mariller	France	23.82	
16	5	Céline Pace	Malta	25.93	
	2	Alenka Bikar	Slovenia	DQ	
	3	Mary Onyali-Omagbemi	Nigeria	DQ	
	4	Gretta Taslakian	Lebanon	DQ	
	5	Roxana Díaz	Cuba	DQ	

=== Semifinals ===
First 2 of each semifinal (Q) qualified directly for the final.

Rank	Heat	Name	Nationality	Time	Notes
DQ	2	Michelle Collins	United States	~~22.31~~	Q, Doping
1	1	Muriel Hurtis-Houairi	France	22.49	Q, WL, NR
2	3	Anastasiya Kapachinskaya	Russia	22.76	Q
3	2	Juliet Campbell	Jamaica	22.84	Q, SB
4	3	Cydonie Mothersill	Cayman Islands	22.85	Q
5	1	Natallia Safronnikava	Belarus	22.91	Q, NR
6	2	Ciara Sheehy	Ireland	23.23	
7	1	Maryna Maydanova	Ukraine	23.26	PB
8	3	Allyson Felix	United States	23.29	
9	2	Manuela Levorato	Italy	23.52	
10	1	Yuliya Tabakova	Russia	23.64	
11	3	Amy Spencer	Great Britain	23.73	

=== Final ===
Rank	Lane	Name	Nationality	Time	React	Notes
DQ	6	Michelle Collins	United States	~~22.18~~		Doping
1st place, gold medalist(s)	5	Muriel Hurtis-Houairi	France	22.54	0.160	
2nd place, silver medalist(s)	3	Anastasiya Kapachinskaya	Russia	22.80	0.249	
3rd place, bronze medalist(s)	4	Juliet Campbell	Jamaica	22.81	0.146	SB
4	2	Cydonie Mothersill	Cayman Islands	23.18	0.172	
5	1	Natallia Safronnikava	Belarus	23.61	0.171	
