= Athletics at the 2000 Summer Olympics – Women's 200 metres =

Women's 200 metres at the Games of the XXVII Olympiad
- Venue: Stadium Australia
- Date: 27 September 2000 (heats and quarter-finals); 28 September 2000 (semi-finals and final)
- Competitors: 52 from 38 nations
- Winning time: 22.27

Medalists
1st place, gold medalist(s)		Pauline Davis-Thompson; Bahamas
2nd place, silver medalist(s)		Susanthika Jayasinghe; Sri Lanka
3rd place, bronze medalist(s)		Beverly McDonald; Jamaica

The Women's 200 metres at the 2000 Summer Olympics as part of the athletics programme was held at Stadium Australia on Wednesday 27 September, and Thursday 28 September 2000. The winning margin was 0.01 seconds which as of 2023 remains the only time the women's Olympic 200 metres was won by less than 0.02 seconds. The winner had the third fastest reaction time in the final.

The top four runners in each of the initial seven heats automatically qualified for the second round. The next four fastest runners from across the heats also qualified for the second round, and the top four runners in each of the four second round heats automatically qualified for the semi-final.

The top four runners in each semi-final automatically qualified for the final. There were a total number of 54 participating athletes.

U.S. sprinter Marion Jones was stripped of her gold medal following her 2007 admission of taking performance-enhancing steroids. Medals were reallocated accordingly.

== Records ==
Prior to this competition, the existing world and Olympic records were as follows:

World Record	21.34 s	Florence Griffith-Joyner	United States	Seoul, South Korea	29 September 1988
Olympic Record	21.34 s	Florence Griffith-Joyner	United States	Seoul, South Korea	29 September 1988

No new world or Olympic records were set for this event.

== Medals ==
Gold:	Silver:	Bronze:
Pauline Davis-Thompson, Bahamas	Susanthika Jayasinghe, Sri Lanka	Beverly McDonald, Jamaica

== Results ==
All times shown are in seconds.

- Q denotes qualification by place in heat.
- q denotes qualification by overall place.
- DNS denotes did not start.
- DNF denotes did not finish.
- DQ denotes disqualification.
- NR denotes national record.
- OR denotes Olympic record.
- WR denotes world record.
- PB denotes personal best.
- SB denotes season best.

== Qualifying heats ==
=== Round 1 ===
Heat 1 of 7 Date: Wednesday 27 September 2000
Place		Athlete	Nation	Lane	Reaction	Time	Qual.	Record
Heat	Overall	Athlete	Nation	Lane	Reaction	Time	Qual.	Record
1	6	Marion Jones	United States	5	0.225	22.75	Q	
2	7	Cydonie Mothersill	Cayman Islands	4	0.246	22.78	Q	
3	12	Felipa Palacios	Colombia	6	0.215	23.08	Q	SB
4	17	Oksana Ekk	Russia	3	0.159	23.17	Q	
5	21T	Fatima Yusuf-Olukoju	Nigeria	2	0.222	23.21	q	
6	23	Alenka Bikar	Slovenia	8	0.191	23.26	q	
7	35	Monica Afia Twum	Ghana	7	0.164	23.51		

Heat 2 of 7 Date: Wednesday 27 September 2000
Place		Athlete	Nation	Lane	Reaction	Time	Qual.	Record
Heat	Overall	Athlete	Nation	Lane	Reaction	Time	Qual.	Record
1	4	Leonie Mani	Cameroon	5	0.150	22.68	Q	
2	10	Muriel Hurtis	France	6	0.220	23.04	Q	
3	14	Cathy Freeman	Australia	2	0.261	23.11	Q	
4	18T	Juliet Campbell	Jamaica	3	0.289	23.18	Q	
5	32	Sarah Reilly	Ireland	1	0.175	23.43		
6	38	Zuzanna Radecka	Poland	7	0.157	23.57		
7	41	Nadjina Kaltouma	Chad	8	0.344	23.81		
8	51	Hana Ali Salah	Yemen	4		30.46		

Heat 3 of 7 Date: Wednesday 27 September 2000
Place		Athlete	Nation	Lane	Reaction	Time	Qual.	Record
Heat	Overall	Athlete	Nation	Lane	Reaction	Time	Qual.	Record
1	11	Lauren Hewitt	Australia	3	0.226	23.07	Q	
2	16	Mercy Nku	Nigeria	2	0.180	23.14	Q	
3	18T	Nanceen Perry	United States	7	0.179	23.18	Q	
4	31	Johanna Manninen	Finland	8	0.222	23.40	Q	
5	36	Ekaterini Koffa	Greece	6	0.245	25.53		
6	50	Dineo Shoal	Lesotho	1	0.171	25.57		
		Manuela Levorato	Italy	4		DNS		
		Andrea Philipp	Germany	5		DNS		

Heat 4 of 7 Date: Wednesday 27 September 2000
Place		Athlete	Nation	Lane	Reaction	Time	Qual.	Record
Heat	Overall	Athlete	Nation	Lane	Reaction	Time	Qual.	Record
1	5	Melinda Gainsford-Taylor	Australia	7	0.251	22.71	Q	
2	8	Louise Ayetotche	Ivory Coast	5	0.283	22.85	Q	NR
3	13	Chandra Sturrup	Bahamas	2	0.181	23.09	Q	
4	39T	Olena Pastushenko	Ukraine	8	0.208	23.64	Q	
5	42	Lyubov Perepelova	Uzbekistan	3	0.300	23.83		
6	43T	Karin Mayr	Austria	6	0.164	23.90		
7	49	Akonga Nsimbo	Democratic Republic of the Congo	4	0.240	25.35		NR
		Ameerah Bello	Virgin Islands	1	0.240	DNF		

Heat 5 of 7 Date: Wednesday 27 September 2000
Place		Athlete	Nation	Lane	Reaction	Time	Qual.	Record
Heat	Overall	Athlete	Nation	Lane	Reaction	Time	Qual.	Record
1	1	Beverly McDonald	Jamaica	5	0.198	22.50	Q	
2	3	Pauline Davis-Thompson	Bahamas	4	0.214	22.61	Q	
3	21T	Irina Khabarova	Russia	3	0.278	23.21	Q	
4	30	Valma Bass	Saint Kitts and Nevis	8	0.209	23.37	Q	
5	33	Mireille Donders	Switzerland	1	0.186	23.44		
6	37	Liu Xiaomei	China	6	0.230	23.56		
7	43T	Joanne Durant	Barbados	7	0.265	23.90		
8	48	Heather Samuel	Antigua and Barbuda	2	0.189	24.44		

Heat 6 of 7 Date: Wednesday 27 September 2000
Place		Athlete	Nation	Lane	Reaction	Time	Qual.	Record
Heat	Overall	Athlete	Nation	Lane	Reaction	Time	Qual.	Record
1	9	Mary Onyali-Omagbemi	Nigeria	8	0.243	22.90	Q	
2	20	Debbie Ferguson	Bahamas	1	0.237	23.31	Q	
3	25T	Sabrina Mulrain	Germany	7	0.216	23.31	Q	
4	27	Astia Walker	Jamaica	5	0.203	23.30	Q	
5	28T	Samantha Davies	Great Britain	4	0.215	23.36	q	
6	45	Qin Wangping	China	3	0.271	24.10		
7	46	Mila Savić	FR Yugoslavia	2	0.330	24.12		
8	47	Monika Gachevska	Bulgaria	6	0.176	24.16		

Heat 7 of 7 Date: Wednesday 27 September 2000
Place		Athlete	Nation	Lane	Reaction	Time	Qual.	Record
Heat	Overall	Athlete	Nation	Lane	Reaction	Time	Qual.	Record
1	2	Susanthika Jayasinghe	Sri Lanka	6	0.229	22.53	Q	
2	15	Zhanna Pintusevych	Ukraine	5	0.213	23.13	Q	
3	24	Torri Edwards	United States	3	0.164	23.29	Q	
4	25T	Marina Trandenkova	Russia	8	0.176	23.31	Q	
5	28T	Joice Maduaka	Great Britain	7	0.196	23.36	q	
6	34	Aïda Diop	Senegal	4	0.196	23.46		
7		Hellena Wrappah	Ghana	2		23.64		

Overall Results Round 1

Round 1 Overall Results
Place	Athlete	Nation	Heat	Lane	Place	Time	Qual.	Record
1	Beverly McDonald	Jamaica	5	5	1	22.50	Q	
2	Susanthika Jayasinghe	Sri Lanka	7	6	1	22.53	Q	
3	Pauline Davis-Thompson	Bahamas	5	4	2	22.61	Q	
4	Leonie Mani	Cameroon	2	5	1	22.68	Q	
5	Melinda Gainsford-Taylor	Australia	4	7	1	22.71	Q	
6	Marion Jones	United States	1	5	1	22.75	Q	
7	Cydonie Mothersill	Cayman Islands	1	4	2	22.78	Q	
8	Louise Ayetotche	Ivory Coast	4	5	2	22.85	Q	NR
9	Mary Onyali-Omagbemi	Nigeria	6	8	1	22.90	Q	
10	Muriel Hurtis	France	2	6	2	23.04	Q	
11	Lauren Hewitt	Australia	3	3	1	23.07	Q	
12	Felipa Palacios	Colombia	1	6	3	23.08	Q	SB
13	Chandra Sturrup	Bahamas	4	2	3	23.09	Q	
14	Cathy Freeman	Australia	2	2	3	23.11	Q	
15	Zhanna Pintusevych	Ukraine	7	5	2	23.13	Q	
16	Mercy Nku	Nigeria	3	2	2	23.14	Q	
17	Oxana Ekk	Russia	1	3	4	23.17	Q	
18	Juliet Campbell	Jamaica	2	3	4	23.18	Q	
18	Nanceen Perry	United States	3	7	3	23.18	Q	
20	Debbie Ferguson	Bahamas	6	1	2	23.19	Q	
21	Irina Khabarova	Russia	5	3	3	23.21	Q	
21	Fatima Yusuf-Olukoju	Nigeria	1	2	5	23.21	q	
23	Alenka Bikar	Slovenia	1	8	6	23.26	q	
24	Torri Edwards	United States	4	3	3	23.29	Q	
25	Sabrina Mulrain	Germany	6	7	3	23.31	Q	
25	Marina Trandenkova	Russia	7	8	4	23.31	Q	
27	Astia Walker	Jamaica	6	5	4	23.33	Q	
28	Samantha Davies	Great Britain	6	4	5	23.36	q	
28	Joice Maduaka	Great Britain	7	7	5	23.36	q	
30	Valma Bass	Saint Kitts and Nevis	5	8	4	23.37	Q	
31	Johanna Manninen	Finland	3	8	4	23.40	Q	
32	Sarah Reilly	Ireland	2	1	5	23.43		
33	Mireille Donders	Switzerland	5	1	5	23.44		
34	Aïda Diop	Senegal	7	4	6	23.46		
35	Monica Afia Twum	Ghana	1	7	7	23.51		
36	Ekaterini Koffa	Greece	3	6	5	23.53		
37	Liu Xiaomei	China	5	6	6	23.56		
38	Zuzanna Radecka	Poland	2	7	6	23.57		
39	Olena Pastushenko	Ukraine	4	8	4	23.64	Q	
39	Hellena Wrappah	Ghana	7	2	7	23.64		
41	Nadjina Kaltouma	Chad	2	8	7	23.81		
42	Lyubov Perepelova	Uzbekistan	4	3	5	23.83		
43	Joanne Durant	Barbados	5	7	7	23.90		
43	Karin Mayr	Austria	4	6	6	23.90		
45	Qin Wangping	China	6	3	6	24.10		
46	Mila Savic	FR Yugoslavia	6	2	7	24.12		
47	Monika Gachevska	Bulgaria	6	6	8	24.16		
48	Heather Samuel	Antigua and Barbuda	5	2	8	24.44		
49	Akonga Nsimbo	Democratic Republic of the Congo	4	4	7	25.35		NR
50	Dineo Shoal	Lesotho	3	1	6	25.57		
51	Hana Ali Salah	Yemen	2	4	8	30.36		
	Ameerah Bello	Virgin Islands	4	1		DNS		
	Manuela Levorato	Italy	3	4		DNS		
	Andrea Philipp	Germany	3	5		DNS		

=== Round 2 ===
Heat 1 of 4 Date: Wednesday 27 September 2000
Place		Athlete	Nation	Lane	Reaction	Time	Qual.	Record
Heat	Overall	Athlete	Nation	Lane	Reaction	Time	Qual.	Record
1	1	Beverly McDonald	Jamaica	5	0.192	22.44	Q	
2	6T	Pauline Davis-Thompson	Bahamas	3	0.228	22.72	Q	
3	8	Cathy Freeman	Australia	7	0.245	22.75	Q	
4	11T	Nanceen Perry	United States	6	0.168	22.95	Q	
5	17	Marina Trandenkova	Russia	2	0.173	23.10		
6	27	Johanna Manninen	Finland	1	0.157	23.41		
7	28T	Joice Maduaka	Great Britain	8	0.208	23.57		
		Cydonie Mothersill	Cayman Islands	4		DNS		

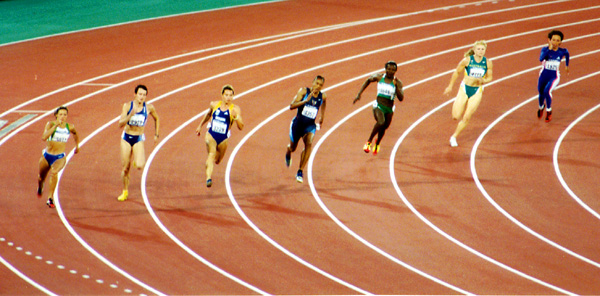
Round 2 Heat 2

Heat 2 of 4 Date: Wednesday 27 September 2000
Place		Athlete	Nation	Lane	Reaction	Time	Qual.	Record
Heat	Overall	Athlete	Nation	Lane	Reaction	Time	Qual.	Record
1	2	Melinda Gainsford-Taylor	Australia	3	0.231	22.49	Q	
2	3	Marion Jones	United States	5	0.221	22.50	Q	
3	5	Zhanna Pintusevych	Ukraine	6	0.181	22.79	Q	SB
4	11T	Mercy Nku	Nigeria	4	0.179	22.95	Q	PB
5	15	Alenka Bikar	Slovenia	8	0.167	23.01		
6	19	Oxana Ekk	Russia	7	0.153	23.17		
7	21	Samantha Davies	Great Britain	2	0.213	23.20		
8	24	Sabrina Mulrain	Germany	1	0.209	23.24		

Heat 3 of 4 Date: Wednesday 27 September 2000
Place		Athlete	Nation	Lane	Reaction	Time	Qual.	Record
Heat	Overall	Athlete	Nation	Lane	Reaction	Time	Qual.	Record
1	6T	Debbie Ferguson	Bahamas	3	0.180	22.72	Q	
2	10	Leonie Mani	Cameroon	6	0.166	22.88	Q	
3	13T	Torri Edwards	United States	7	0.186	22.98	Q	
4	13T	Muriel Hurtis	France	5	0.196	22.98	Q	
5	16	Mary Onyali-Omagbemi	Nigeria	4	0.252	23.03		
6	25	Irina Khabarova	Russia	2	0.204	23.27		
7	30	Olena Pastushenko	Ukraine	1	0.145	23.63		
		Astia Walker	Jamaica	8	0.184	DNF		

Heat 4 of 4 Date: Wednesday 27 September 2000
Place		Athlete	Nation	Lane	Reaction	Time	Qual.	Record
Heat	Overall	Athlete	Nation	Lane	Reaction	Time	Qual.	Record
1	4	Susanthika Jayasinghe	Sri Lanka	6	0.211	22.54	Q	
2	9	Louise Ayetotche	Ivory Coast	3	0.222	22.86	Q	
3	18	Lauren Hewitt	Australia	5	0.180	23.12	Q	
4	20	Felipa Palacios	Colombia	4	0.185	23.19	Q	
5	22T	Chandra Sturrup	Bahamas	7	0.169	23.21		
6	22T	Fatima Yusuf-Olukoju	Nigeria	2	0.229	23.21		
7	26	Juliet Campbell	Jamaica	1	0.190	23.34		
8	28T	Valma Bass	Saint Kitts and Nevis	8	0.268	23.57		

Overall Results Round 2

Round 2 Overall Results
Place	Athlete	Nation	Heat	Lane	Place	Time	Qual.	Record
1	Beverly McDonald	Jamaica	1	5	1	22.44	Q	
2	Melinda Gainsford-Taylor	Australia	2	3	1	22.49	Q	
3	Marion Jones	United States	2	5	2	22.50	Q	
4	Susanthika Jayasinghe	Sri Lanka	4	6	1	22.54	Q	
5	Zhanna Pintusevych	Ukraine	2	6	3	22.70	Q	SB
6	Pauline Davis-Thompson	Bahamas	3	3	1	22.72	Q	
6	Debbie Ferguson	Bahamas	3	3	1	22.72	Q	
8	Cathy Freeman	Australia	1	7	3	22.75	Q	
9	Louise Ayetotche	Ivory Coast	4	3	2	22.86	Q	
10	Leonie Mani	Cameroon	3	6	2	22.86	Q	
11	Mercy Nku	Nigeria	2	4	4	22.95	Q	PB
11	Nanceen Perry	United States	1	6	4	22.95	Q	
13	Torri Edwards	United States	3	7	3	22.98	Q	
13	Muriel Hurtis	France	3	5	4	22.98	Q	
15	Alenka Bikar	Slovenia	2	8	5	23.01		
16	Mary Onyali-Omagbemi	Nigeria	3	4	5	23.03		
17	Marina Trandenkova	Russia	1	2	5	23.10		
18	Lauren Hewitt	Australia	4	5	3	23.12	Q	
19	Oxana Ekk	Russia	2	7	6	23.17		
20	Felipa Palacios	Colombia	4	4	4	23.19	Q	
21	Samantha Davies	Great Britain	2	2	7	23.20		
22	Chandra Sturrup	Bahamas	4	7	5	23.21		
22	Fatima Yusuf-Olukoju	Nigeria	4	2	6	23.21		
24	Sabrina Mulrain	Germany	2	1	8	23.24		
25	Irina Khabarova	Russia	3	2	6	23.27		
26	Juliet Campbell	Jamaica	4	1	7	23.34		
27	Johanna Manninen	Finland	1	1	6	23.41		
28	Valma Bass	Saint Kitts and Nevis	4	8	8	23.57		
28	Joice Maduaka	Great Britain	1	8	7	23.57		
30	Olena Pastushenko	Ukraine	3	1	7	23.63		
	Astia Walker	Jamaica	3	8		DNF		
	Cydonie Mothersill	Cayman Islands	1	4		DNS		

=== Semi-finals ===
Heat 1 of 2 Date: Thursday 28 September 2000
Place		Athlete	Nation	Lane	Reaction	Time	Qual.	Record
Heat	Overall	Athlete	Nation	Lane	Reaction	Time	Qual.	Record
1	2	Marion Jones	United States	5	0.233	22.40	Q	
2	5	Debbie Ferguson	Bahamas	4	0.191	22.62	Q	
3	6	Beverly McDonald	Jamaica	3	0.250	22.70	Q	
4	8	Zhanna Pintusevych	Ukraine	2	0.171	22.74	Q	
5	11	Felipa Palacios	Colombia	1	0.189	23.11		
6	14	Mercy Nku	Nigeria	8	0.222	23.40		
7	15	Lauren Hewitt	Australia	7	0.290	23.44		
8	16	Leonie Mani	Cameroon	6	0.180	23.47		

Heat 2 of 2 Date: Thursday 28 September 2000
Place		Athlete	Nation	Lane	Reaction	Time	Qual.	Record
Heat	Overall	Athlete	Nation	Lane	Reaction	Time	Qual.	Record
1	1	Pauline Davis-Thompson	Bahamas	5	0.227	22.38	Q	PB
2	3	Susanthika Jayasinghe	Sri Lanka	6	0.253	22.45	Q	
3	4	Melinda Gainsford-Taylor	Australia	3	0.226	22.61	Q	
4	7	Cathy Freeman	Australia	2	0.262	22.71	Q	
5	9	Louise Ayetotche	Ivory Coast	4	0.219	22.76		NR
6	10	Torri Edwards	United States	7	0.170	23.06		
7	12	Muriel Hurtis	France	8	0.208	23.13		
8	13	Nanceen Perry	United States	1	0.159	23.16		

Overall Results Semi-Finals

Semi-Finals Overall Results
Place	Athlete	Nation	Heat	Lane	Place	Time	Qual.	Record
1	Pauline Davis-Thompson	Bahamas	2	5	1	22.38	Q	PB
2	Marion Jones	United States	1	5	1	22.40	Q	
3	Susanthika Jayasinghe	Sri Lanka	2	6	2	22.45	Q	
4	Melinda Gainsford-Taylor	Australia	2	3	3	22.62	Q	
5	Debbie Ferguson	Bahamas	1	4	2	22.62	Q	
6	Beverly McDonald	Jamaica	1	3	3	22.70	Q	
7	Cathy Freeman	Australia	2	2	4	22.71	Q	
8	Zhanna Pintusevych	Ukraine	1	2	4	22.74	Q	
9	Louise Ayetotche	Ivory Coast	2	4	5	22.76		
10	Torri Edwards	United States	2	7	6	23.06		
11	Felipa Palacios	Colombia	1	1	5	23.11		
12	Muriel Hurtis	France	2	8	7	23.13		
13	Nanceen Perry	United States	2	1	8	23.16		
14	Mercy Nku	Nigeria	1	8	6	23.40		
15	Lauren Hewitt	Australia	1	1	7	23.44		
16	Leonie Mani	Cameroon	1	6	8	23.47		

=== Final ===
Date: Thursday 28 September 2000
Place	Athlete	Nation	Lane	Reaction	Time	Record
1st place, gold medalist(s)	Pauline Davis-Thompson	Bahamas	3	0.185	22.27	PB
2nd place, silver medalist(s)	Susanthika Jayasinghe	Sri Lanka	6	0.207	22.28	NR
3rd place, bronze medalist(s)	Beverly McDonald	Jamaica	1	0.151	22.35	SB
4	Debbie Ferguson	Bahamas	5	0.196	22.37	SB
5	Melinda Gainsford-Taylor	Australia	7	0.178	22.42	SB
6	Cathy Freeman	Australia	2	0.235	22.53	SB
7	Zhanna Pintusevich	Ukraine	8	0.190	22.66	SB
DSQ	Marion Jones	United States	4	0.174	~~21.84~~	~~SB~~

== See also ==
- 1998 Women's European Championships 200 metres (Budapest)
- 1999 Women's World Championships 200 metres (Seville)
- 2001 Women's World Championships 200 metres (Edmonton)
- 2002 Women's European Championships 200 metres (Munich)
