= 2002 European Athletics Indoor Championships – Women's 200 metres =

The men's 200 metres event at the 2002 European Athletics Indoor Championships was held on March 1–2.

== Medalists ==
Gold	Silver	Bronze
Muriel Hurtis; France	Karin Mayr; Austria	Gabi Rockmeier; Germany

== Results ==
=== Heats ===
First 2 of each heat (Q) and the next 3 fastest (q) qualified for the semifinals.

Rank	Heat	Name	Nationality	Time	Notes
1	4	Muriel Hurtis	France	22.74	Q
2	5	Karin Mayr	Austria	22.82	Q
3	2	Gabi Rockmeier	Germany	22.99	Q, PB
4	3	Nora Ivanova-Güner	Turkey	23.15	Q, SB
5	3	Ciara Sheehy	Ireland	23.34	q, PB
6	2	Yuliya Tabakova	Russia	23.35	Q, PB
7	3	Fabe Dia	France	23.27	Q
8	1	Sylviane Félix	France	23.36	Q
9	6	Ekaterina Tosheva-Mashova	Bulgaria	23.39	Q, PB
10	4	Katrin Käärt	Estonia	23.61	Q, NR
11	1	Sarah Reilly	Ireland	23.72	Q
12	5	Marina Vasarmidou	Greece	23.74	Q
13	3	Olga Halandyreva	Russia	23.77	q, SB
14	4	Aksel Gürcan	Turkey	23.82	q
15	1	Enikő Szabó	Hungary	23.88	PB
16	5	Štěpánka Klapáčová	Czech Republic	23.97	
17	6	Anna Pacholak	Poland	24.03	Q, PB
18	2	Maja Nose	Slovenia	24.24	
19	1	Sandra Rehrl	Austria	24.76	
	6	Svetlana Goncharenko	Russia	DNS	
	6	Aleksandra Vojnevska	Macedonia	DNS	

=== Semifinals ===
First 2 of each semifinal qualified directly (Q) for the final.

Rank	Heat	Name	Nationality	Time	Notes
1	3	Muriel Hurtis	France	22.71	Q
2	1	Karin Mayr	Austria	22.77	Q, NR
3	2	Gabi Rockmeier	Germany	23.06	Q
4	2	Nora Ivanova-Güner	Turkey	23.19	Q
5	1	Sylviane Félix	France	23.31	Q
6	3	Ekaterina Tosheva-Mashova	Bulgaria	23.48	Q
7	2	Fabe Dia	France	23.51	
8	3	Ciara Sheehy	Ireland	23.62	
9	1	Yuliya Tabakova	Russia	23.78	
9	2	Olga Halandyreva	Russia	23.78	
9	3	Katrin Käärt	Estonia	23.78	
12	1	Marina Vasarmidou	Greece	23.80	
13	2	Sarah Reilly	Ireland	23.90	
14	3	Anna Pacholak	Poland	24.06	
	1	Aksel Gürcan	Turkey	DNF	

=== Final ===
Rank	Lane	Name	Nationality	Time	Notes
1st place, gold medalist(s)	5	Muriel Hurtis	France	22.52	
2nd place, silver medalist(s)	6	Karin Mayr	Austria	22.70	NR
3rd place, bronze medalist(s)	3	Gabi Rockmeier	Germany	23.05	
4	4	Nora Ivanova-Güner	Turkey	23.08	=NR
5	1	Sylviane Félix	France	23.87	
6	2	Ekaterina Tosheva-Mashova	Bulgaria	23.99	
