= Athletics at the 2006 Commonwealth Games – Women's 100 metres =

Women's 100 metres at the Commonwealth Games

The women's 100 metres event at the 2006 Commonwealth Games was held on March 19–20.

== Medalists ==
Gold	Silver	Bronze
Sheri-Ann Brooks; Jamaica	Geraldine Pillay; South Africa	Delphine Atangana; Cameroon

== Results ==
=== Heats ===
Qualification: First 3 of each heat (Q) and the next 9 fastest (q) qualified for the semifinals.

Wind:
Heat 1: 0.0 m/s, Heat 2: +0.5 m/s, Heat 3: +1.6 m/s, Heat 4: +0.6 m/s, Heat 5: +1.2 m/s

Rank	Heat	Name	Nationality	Time	Notes
1	4	Sheri-Ann Brooks	Jamaica	11.30	Q, SB
2	3	Delphine Atangana	Cameroon	11.35	Q, PB
3	5	Myriam Léonie Mani	Cameroon	11.40	Q, SB
4	2	Laura Turner	England	11.43	Q, PB
4	5	Peta Dowdie	Jamaica	11.43	Q
6	3	Emma Ania	England	11.44	Q
7	4	Tahesia Harrigan	British Virgin Islands	11.48	Q
8	4	Ayanna Hutchinson	Trinidad and Tobago	11.49	Q
9	1	Sally McLellan	Australia	11.51	Q
9	2	Geraldine Pillay	South Africa	11.51	Q
9	4	Vida Anim	Ghana	11.51	q
9	5	Erica Broomfield	Canada	11.51	Q
13	5	Fana Ashby	Trinidad and Tobago	11.54	q
14	4	Endurance Ojokolo	Nigeria	11.57	q
15	1	Anyika Onuora	England	11.59	Q
16	2	Danielle Browning	Jamaica	11.61	Q
17	3	Mercy Nku	Nigeria	11.62	Q
18	2	Funmilola Ogundana	Nigeria	11.65	q, SB
18	3	Anna Boyle	Northern Ireland	11.65	q
20	5	Gifty Addy	Ghana	11.84	q
21	1	Mae Koime	Papua New Guinea	11.88	Q
22	1	Eleni Artymata	Cyprus	12.04	q
23	2	Sonia Williams	Antigua and Barbuda	12.27	q
24	5	Isha Conteh	Sierra Leone	12.56	q
25	4	Susan Tengatenga	Malawi	12.60	
26	5	Fatmata Bangura	Sierra Leone	12.62	
27	5	Tricia Flores	Belize	12.63	
28	3	Tahitia Kamea	Fiji	12.64	
29	1	Curlee Gumbs	Anguilla	12.73	
30	4	Marion Bangura	Sierra Leone	13.29	
31	3	Jauna Nafiz	Maldives	13.75	
32	4	Hawwa Haneefa	Maldives	13.91	
	1	Sylvie Mballa Eloundou	Cameroon	DNS	
	3	Tamica Clarke	Bahamas	DNS	

=== Semifinals ===
Qualification: First 2 of each semifinal (Q) and the next 2 fastest (q) qualified for the final.

Wind:
Heat 1: +1.4 m/s, Heat 2: –0.3 m/s, Heat 3: +1.9 m/s

Rank	Heat	Name	Nationality	Time	Notes
1	2	Geraldine Pillay	South Africa	11.32	Q
2	1	Sheri-Ann Brooks	Jamaica	11.35	Q, SB
3	1	Sally McLellan	Australia	11.38	Q, PB
4	1	Delphine Atangana	Cameroon	11.38	q
4	2	Laura Turner	England	11.38	Q
6	3	Erica Broomfield	Canada	11.43	Q, SB
7	3	Tahesia Harrigan	British Virgin Islands	11.44	Q
8	3	Emma Ania	England	11.45	q
9	1	Anyika Onuora	England	11.46	
10	2	Myriam Léonie Mani	Cameroon	11.49	
10	3	Peta Dowdie	Jamaica	11.49	
12	2	Vida Anim	Ghana	11.51	
13	2	Ayanna Hutchinson	Trinidad and Tobago	11.53	
14	1	Fana Ashby	Trinidad and Tobago	11.57	
15	1	Mercy Nku	Nigeria	11.58	
16	3	Endurance Ojokolo	Nigeria	11.61	
17	3	Anna Boyle	Northern Ireland	11.67	
18	3	Mae Koime	Papua New Guinea	11.71	PB
19	2	Funmilola Ogundana	Nigeria	11.76	
20	2	Danielle Browning	Jamaica	11.76	
21	2	Eleni Artymata	Cyprus	11.84	
22	1	Gifty Addy	Ghana	11.92	
23	1	Sonia Williams	Antigua and Barbuda	12.05	
24	3	Isha Conteh	Sierra Leone	13.00	

=== Final ===
Wind: +0.2 m/s

Rank	Lane	Name	Nationality	Time	Notes
1st place, gold medalist(s)	3	Sheri-Ann Brooks	Jamaica	11.19	PB
2nd place, silver medalist(s)	6	Geraldine Pillay	South Africa	11.31	
3rd place, bronze medalist(s)	8	Delphine Atangana	Cameroon	11.39	
4	1	Laura Turner	England	11.46	
5	2	Tahesia Harrigan	British Virgin Islands	11.48	
6	5	Erica Broomfield	Canada	11.49	
7	4	Sally McLellan	Australia	11.50	
8	7	Emma Ania	England	11.51	
