= 2001 European Athletics U23 Championships – Women's 200 metres =

The women's 200 metres event at the 2001 European Athletics U23 Championships was held in Amsterdam, Netherlands, at Olympisch Stadion on 14 July.

== Medalists ==
Gold	Johanna Manninen; Finland
Silver	Sina Schielke; Germany
Bronze	Ciara Sheehy; Ireland

== Results ==
=== Final ===
14 July
Wind: -0.3 m/s

Rank	Name	Nationality	Time	Notes
1st place, gold medalist(s)	Johanna Manninen	Finland	23.30	
2nd place, silver medalist(s)	Sina Schielke	Germany	23.45	
3rd place, bronze medalist(s)	Ciara Sheehy	Ireland	23.54	
4	Yuliya Tabakova	Russia	23.58	
5	Olga Kaidantzi	Greece	23.79	
6	Emily Maher	Ireland	23.80	
7	Helen Roscoe	United Kingdom	23.96	
8	Emily Freeman	United Kingdom	24.03	

=== Heats ===
14 July
Qualified: first 3 in each heat and 2 best to the Final

==== Heat 1 ====
Wind: -0.6 m/s

Rank	Name	Nationality	Time	Notes
1	Johanna Manninen	Finland	23.57	Q
2	Emily Maher	Ireland	23.79	Q
3	Yuliya Tabakova	Russia	23.90	Q
4	Olena Pastushenko	Ukraine	24.55	
5	Silja Úlfarsdóttir	Iceland	24.60	
6	Melanie Purkiss	United Kingdom	26.98	

==== Heat 2 ====
Wind: -0.6 m/s

Rank	Name	Nationality	Time	Notes
1	Ciara Sheehy	Ireland	23.71	Q
2	Sina Schielke	Germany	23.74	Q
3	Olga Kaidantzi	Greece	23.84	Q
4	Helen Roscoe	United Kingdom	24.01	q
5	Emily Freeman	United Kingdom	24.12	q
6	Pascal van Assendelft	Netherlands	24.54	

== Participation ==
According to an unofficial count, 12 athletes from 9 countries participated in the event.

- Finland (1)
- Germany (1)
- Greece (1)
- Iceland (1)
- Ireland (2)
- Netherlands (1)
- Russia (1)
- Ukraine (1)
- United Kingdom (3)
