= 1998 World Junior Championships in Athletics – Women's 4 × 100 metres relay =

The women's 4×100 metres relay event at the 1998 World Junior Championships in Athletics was held in Annecy, France, at Parc des Sports on 2 August.

== Medalists ==
Gold	Angela Williams; Keyon Soley; Myra Combs; Shakedia Jones; United States
Silver	Céline Thélamon; Muriel Hurtis; Nadia Imalouan; Anne Carole Rapp; France
Bronze	Tulia Robinson; Aleen Bailey; Melaine Walker; Lisa Sharpe; Jamaica

== Results ==
=== Final ===
2 August

Rank	Nation	Competitors	Time	Notes
1st place, gold medalist(s)	United States	Angela Williams; Keyon Soley; Myra Combs; Shakedia Jones	43.52	
2nd place, silver medalist(s)	France	Céline Thélamon; Muriel Hurtis; Nadia Imalouan; Anne Carole Rapp	44.07	
3rd place, bronze medalist(s)	Jamaica	Tulia Robinson; Aleen Bailey; Melaine Walker; Lisa Sharpe	44.61	
4	United Kingdom	Abi Oyepitan; Sarah Wilhelmy; Samantha Davies; Rebecca White	44.65	
5	Poland	Malgorzata Górecka; Edyta Rela; Monika Giemzo; Anna Pacholak	44.75	
6	South Africa	Arnella Jacobs; Estie Wittstock; Carika Potgieter; Isabel Roussow	45.67	
7	Italy	Erica Marchetti; Cornelia Kupa; Maria Chiara Baccini; Silvia Favre	45.94	
	Finland	Manuela Bosco; Katja Salivaara; Johanna Manninen; Heidi Hannula	DNF	

=== Heats ===
2 August

==== Heat 1 ====
Rank	Nation	Competitors	Time	Notes
1	United States	Angela Williams; Keyon Soley; Myra Combs; Miesha Withers	44.14	Q
2	Finland	Manuela Bosco; Katja Salivaara; Johanna Manninen; Heidi Hannula	45.36	Q
3	United Kingdom	Abi Oyepitan; Sarah Wilhelmy; Samantha Davies; Melanie Purkiss	45.43	Q
4	Poland	Malgorzata Górecka; Edyta Rela; Monika Giemzo; Anna Pacholak	45.56	q
5	Italy	Erica Marchetti; Cornelia Kupa; Maria Chiara Baccini; Silvia Favre	45.62	q
6	Bahamas	Juanita Ferguson; Tamicka Clarke; Tamara Cherebin; Marcia Dorsett	45.98	

==== Heat 2 ====
Rank	Nation	Competitors	Time	Notes
1	France	Céline Thélamon; Muriel Hurtis; Nadia Imalouan; Anne Carole Rapp	44.23	Q
2	Jamaica	Tulia Robinson; Aleen Bailey; Melaine Walker; Lisa Sharpe	44.85	Q
3	South Africa	Arnella Jacobs; Carika Potgieter; Charlene Lawrence; Isabel Roussow	46.29	Q
4	Spain	Vanessa Peñalver; Marta Prado; Laura Amo; Concepción Montaner	47.17	
	Germany	Cathleen Tschirch; Annegret Dietrich; Sina Schielke; Katrin Wilts	DQ	IAAF rule 170.14

== Participation ==
According to an unofficial count, 47 athletes from 11 countries participated in the event.

- Bahamas (4)
- Finland (4)
- France (4)
- Germany (4)
- Italy (4)
- Jamaica (4)
- Poland (4)
- South Africa (5)
- Spain (4)
- United Kingdom (5)
- United States (5)
