= 1999 European Athletics U23 Championships – Women's 4 × 100 metres relay =

The women's 4 x 100 metres relay event at the 1999 European Athletics U23 Championships was held in Gothenburg, Sweden, at Ullevi on 1 August 1999.

== Medalists ==
Gold	Nadine Mahobah; Muriel Hurtis; Fabé Dia; Doris Deruel; France
Silver	Alice Reuss; Marion Wagner; Esther Möller; Sabrina Mulrain; Germany
Bronze	Monika Długa; Irena Sznajder; Agnieszka Rysiukiewicz; Magdalena Haszczyc; Poland

== Results ==
=== Final ===
1 August

Rank	Nation	Competitors	Time	Notes
1st place, gold medalist(s)	France	Nadine Mahobah; Muriel Hurtis; Fabé Dia; Doris Deruel	43.39	CR
2nd place, silver medalist(s)	Germany	Alice Reuss; Marion Wagner; Esther Möller; Sabrina Mulrain	43.53	
3rd place, bronze medalist(s)	Poland	Monika Długa; Irena Sznajder; Agnieszka Rysiukiewicz; Magdalena Haszczyc	44.47	
4	Great Britain	Laura Seston; Melanie Purkiss; Samantha Davies; Susan Williams	44.55	
5	Spain	Laura Antón; Elena Córcoles; Cristina Sanz; Cristina Calvo	44.86	
6	Sweden	Linda Skoglund; Veronica Fransson; Karin Jönsson; Annika Amundin	45.28	
7	Hungary	Kinga Wéber; Enikő Szabó; Renáta Balazsic; Barbara Petráhn	45.47	

== Participation ==
According to an unofficial count, 28 athletes from 7 countries participated in the event.

- France (4)
- Germany (4)
- Great Britain (4)
- Hungary (4)
- Poland (4)
- Spain (4)
- Sweden (4)
