= 1998 World Junior Championships in Athletics – Women's 200 metres =

The women's 200 metres event at the 1998 World Junior Championships in Athletics was held in Annecy, France, at Parc des Sports on 31 July and 1 August.

== Medalists ==
Gold	Muriel Hurtis; France
Silver	Shakedia Jones; United States
Bronze	Sarah Wilhelmy; United Kingdom

== Results ==
=== Final ===
1 August
Wind: -1.1 m/s

Rank	Name	Nationality	Time	Notes
1st place, gold medalist(s)	Muriel Hurtis	France	23.22	
2nd place, silver medalist(s)	Shakedia Jones	United States	23.39	
3rd place, bronze medalist(s)	Sarah Wilhelmy	United Kingdom	23.56	
4	Johanna Manninen	Finland	23.68	
5	Melaine Walker	Jamaica	23.72	
6	Joan Ekah	Nigeria	23.76	
7	Edyta Rela	Poland	23.80	
8	Funmilola Ogundana	Nigeria	23.99	

=== Semifinals ===
1 August

==== Semifinal 1 ====
Wind: -0.6 m/s

Rank	Name	Nationality	Time	Notes
1	Johanna Manninen	Finland	23.58	Q
2	Sarah Wilhelmy	United Kingdom	23.62	Q
3	Melaine Walker	Jamaica	23.67	Q
4	Joan Ekah	Nigeria	23.79	Q
5	Petronella Árva	Hungary	23.81	
6	Myra Combs	United States	23.84	
7	Anna Pacholak	Poland	24.21	
8	Nadia Imalouan	France	24.24	

==== Semifinal 2 ====
Wind: -0.7 m/s

Rank	Name	Nationality	Time	Notes
1	Muriel Hurtis	France	23.26	Q
2	Shakedia Jones	United States	23.35	Q
3	Edyta Rela	Poland	23.75	Q
4	Funmilola Ogundana	Nigeria	23.79	Q
5	Atia Weekes	Canada	23.81	
6	Enikő Szabó	Hungary	23.93	
7	Jenny Kallur	Sweden	24.01	
8	Ólga Kaidantzí	Greece	24.63	

=== Quarterfinals ===
31 July

==== Quarterfinal 1 ====
Wind: +0.7 m/s

Rank	Name	Nationality	Time	Notes
1	Atia Weekes	Canada	23.45	Q
2	Funmilola Ogundana	Nigeria	23.56	Q
3	Myra Combs	United States	23.59	Q
4	Ólga Kaidantzí	Greece	24.02	Q
5	Olga Nikitenko	Kazakhstan	24.28	
6	Lucy-Ann Richards	Barbados	24.44	
7	Hazel-Ann Regis	Grenada	24.56	
8	Paula Osorio	Chile	24.65	

==== Quarterfinal 2 ====
Wind: +0.7 m/s

Rank	Name	Nationality	Time	Notes
1	Sarah Wilhelmy	United Kingdom	23.69	Q
2	Petronella Árva	Hungary	23.81	Q
3	Anna Pacholak	Poland	23.85	Q
4	Nadia Imalouan	France	23.91	Q
5	Cathleen Tschirch	Germany	24.14	
6	Emily Maher	Ireland	24.28	
	Fana Ashby	Trinidad and Tobago	DNS	
	Leticia Mutta	Tanzania	DNS	

==== Quarterfinal 3 ====
Wind: +0.7 m/s

Rank	Name	Nationality	Time	Notes
1	Joan Ekah	Nigeria	23.50	Q
2	Muriel Hurtis	France	23.52	Q
3	Enikő Szabó	Hungary	23.70	Q
4	Jenny Kallur	Sweden	23.80	Q
5	Isabel Roussow	South Africa	23.84	
6	Lyubov Perepelova	Uzbekistan	24.36	
7	Tamicka Clarke	Bahamas	24.62	
8	Sonia Williams	Antigua and Barbuda	24.79	

==== Quarterfinal 4 ====
Wind: -1.1 m/s

Rank	Name	Nationality	Time	Notes
1	Shakedia Jones	United States	23.70	Q
2	Johanna Manninen	Finland	23.80	Q
3	Edyta Rela	Poland	23.90	Q
4	Melaine Walker	Jamaica	24.00	Q
5	Zeng Xiujun	China	24.07	
6	Rebecca White	United Kingdom	24.40	
7	Delphine Carmagnole	Mauritius	24.64	
8	Ciara Sheehy	Ireland	24.71	

=== Heats ===
31 July

==== Heat 1 ====
Wind: -0.2 m/s

Rank	Name	Nationality	Time	Notes
1	Muriel Hurtis	France	23.14	Q
2	Isabel Roussow	South Africa	24.01	Q
3	Enikő Szabó	Hungary	24.10	Q
4	Cathleen Tschirch	Germany	24.34	Q
5	Delphine Carmagnole	Mauritius	24.48	q
6	Sandra Reategui	Peru	24.85	
7	Kadiatou Camara	Mali	25.88	

==== Heat 2 ====
Wind: -1.0 m/s

Rank	Name	Nationality	Time	Notes
1	Johanna Manninen	Finland	24.05	Q
2	Shakedia Jones	United States	24.39	Q
3	Ólga Kaidantzí	Greece	24.60	Q
4	Hazel-Ann Regis	Grenada	25.07	Q
5	Bozidarka Crncan	Croatia	25.18	
6	Aminata Bangura	Sierra Leone	26.70	

==== Heat 3 ====
Wind: +0.7 m/s

Rank	Name	Nationality	Time	Notes
1	Sarah Wilhelmy	United Kingdom	23.52	Q
2	Joan Ekah	Nigeria	23.63	Q
3	Jenny Kallur	Sweden	23.89	Q
4	Sonia Williams	Antigua and Barbuda	24.36	Q
5	Paula Osorio	Chile	24.45	q
6	Tamicka Clarke	Bahamas	24.71	q

==== Heat 4 ====
Wind: +0.5 m/s

Rank	Name	Nationality	Time	Notes
1	Anna Pacholak	Poland	23.96	Q
2	Myra Combs	United States	24.11	Q
3	Leticia Mutta	Tanzania	24.40	Q
4	Lyubov Perepelova	Uzbekistan	24.44	Q
5	Nino Bagashvili	Georgia	24.75	

==== Heat 5 ====
Wind: -0.9 m/s

Rank	Name	Nationality	Time	Notes
1	Funmilola Ogundana	Nigeria	23.84	Q
2	Olga Nikitenko	Kazakhstan	24.50	Q
3	Rebecca White	United Kingdom	24.57	Q
4	Emily Maher	Ireland	24.60	Q
5	Cornelia Kupa	Italy	24.72	
	Justine Bayiga	Uganda	DNF	

==== Heat 6 ====
Wind: 0.0 m/s

Rank	Name	Nationality	Time	Notes
1	Atia Weekes	Canada	23.84	Q
2	Melaine Walker	Jamaica	24.06	Q
3	Lucy-Ann Richards	Barbados	24.67	Q
4	Ciara Sheehy	Ireland	24.74	Q
5	Carika Potgieter	South Africa	24.97	
6	Hung Siu-Ting	Chinese Taipei	25.35	
7	Hiranisha Rasimuddin	Singapore	25.93	

==== Heat 7 ====
Wind: +0.5 m/s

Rank	Name	Nationality	Time	Notes
1	Edyta Rela	Poland	23.65	Q
2	Nadia Imalouan	France	23.79	Q
3	Petronella Árva	Hungary	23.80	Q
4	Zeng Xiujun	China	23.84	Q
5	Fana Ashby	Trinidad and Tobago	24.50	q
6	Rondelle Ryan	Australia	24.82	
7	Bernardette Damgoua	Cameroon	25.80	
8	Phetsamone Paseuthxay	Laos	27.58	

== Participation ==
According to an unofficial count, 45 athletes from 37 countries participated in the event.

- Antigua and Barbuda (1)
- Australia (1)
- Bahamas (1)
- Barbados (1)
- Cameroon (1)
- Canada (1)
- Chile (1)
- China (1)
- Chinese Taipei (1)
- Croatia (1)
- Finland (1)
- France (2)
- Georgia (1)
- Germany (1)
- Greece (1)
- Grenada (1)
- Hungary (2)
- Ireland (2)
- Italy (1)
- Jamaica (1)
- Kazakhstan (1)
- Laos (1)
- Mali (1)
- Mauritius (1)
- Nigeria (2)
- Peru (1)
- Poland (2)
- Sierra Leone (1)
- Singapore (1)
- South Africa (2)
- Sweden (1)
- Tanzania (1)
- Trinidad and Tobago (1)
- Uganda (1)
- United Kingdom (2)
- United States (2)
- Uzbekistan (1)
