= 2004 European Cup (athletics) =

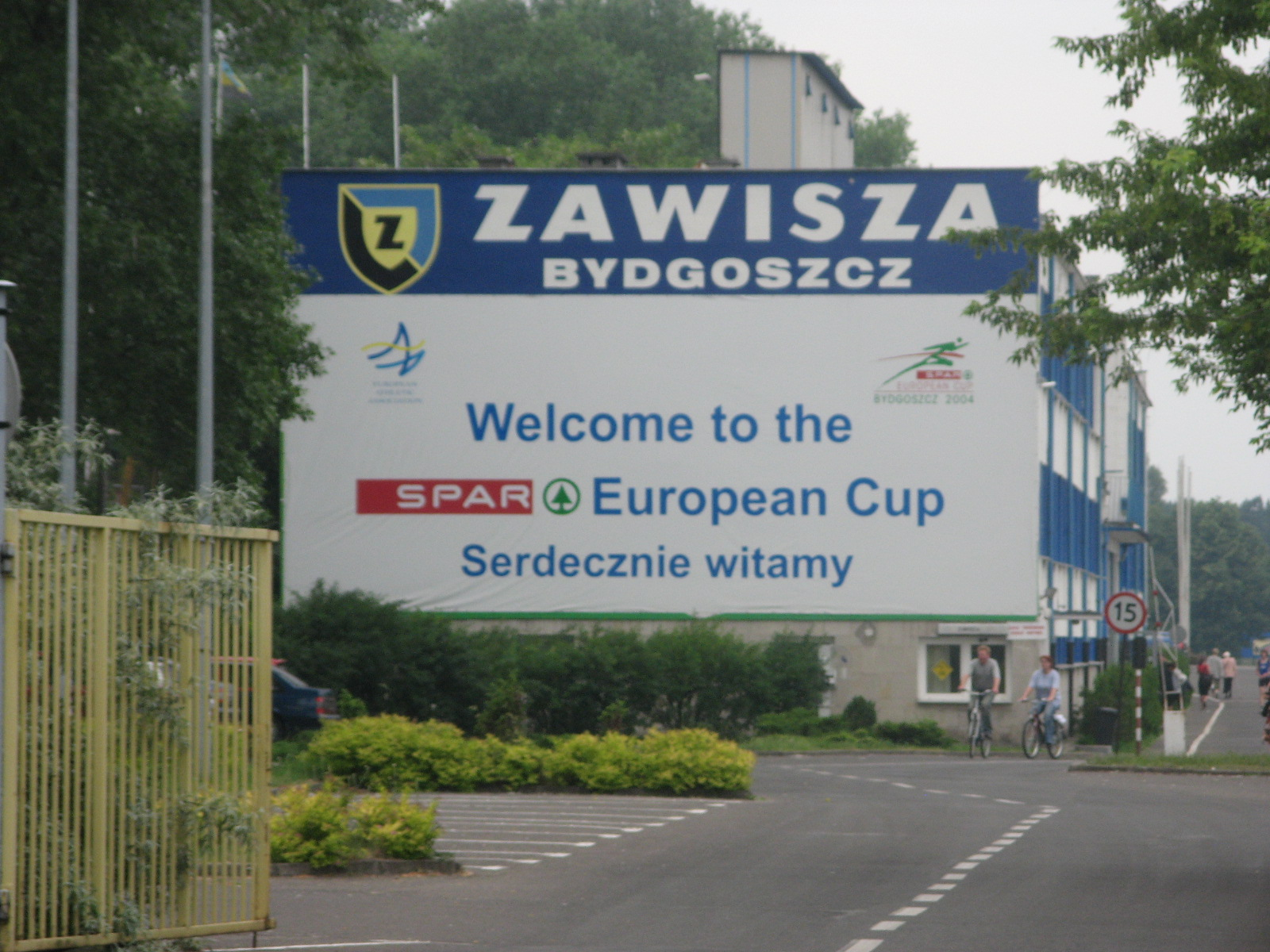
- Dates: 19–20 June
- Host city: Bydgoszcz, Poland
- Venue: Zdzisław Krzyszkowiak Stadium
- Level: Senior
- Type: Outdoor
- Events: 40

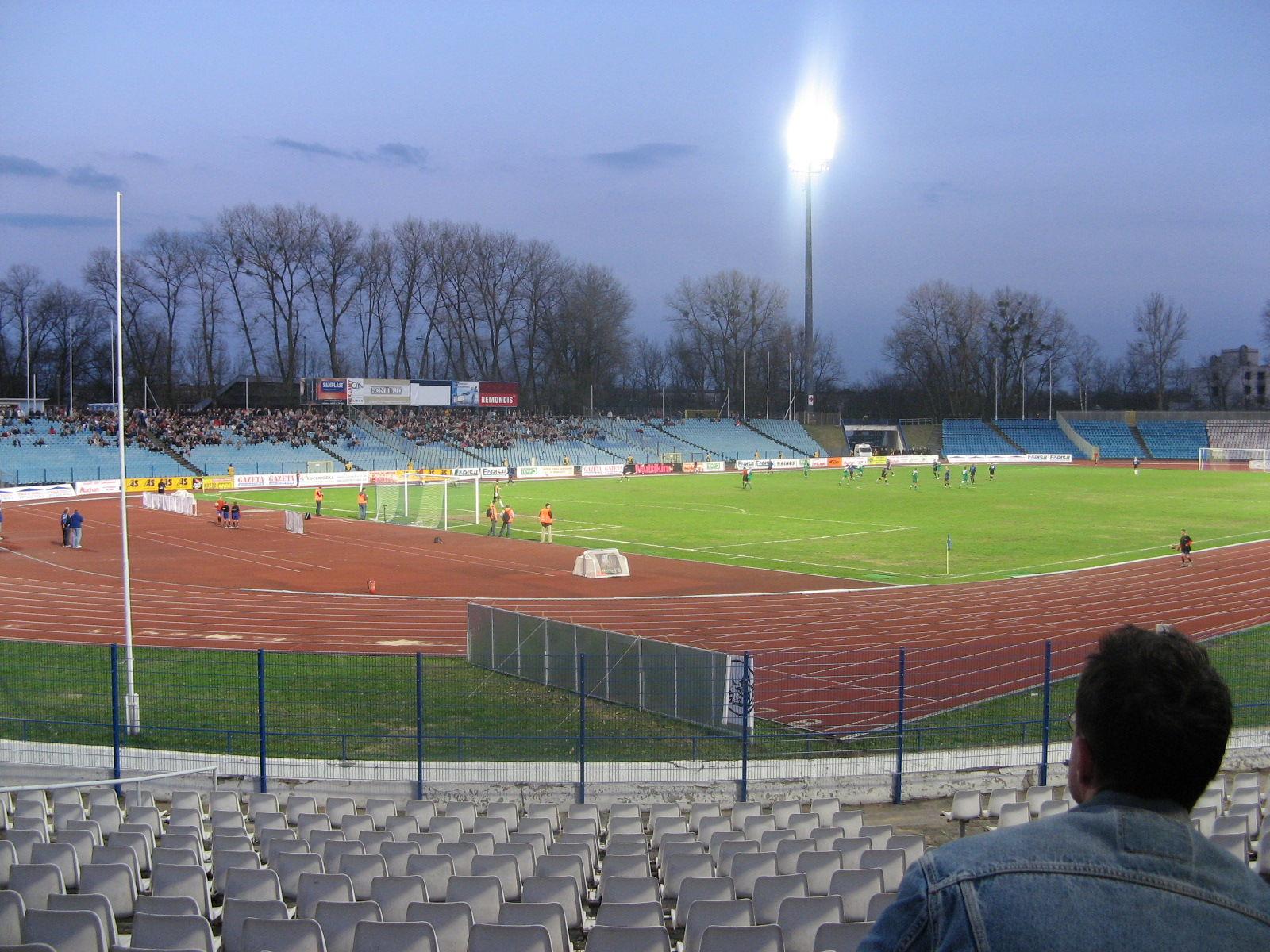
Zdzisław Krzyszkowiak Stadium (photo 2006).

The 2004 Spar European Cup took place on 19 and 20 June 2004 at the Zdzisław Krzyszkowiak Stadium in Bydgoszcz, Poland. This was the 25th European Cup and the first time the event was hosted by Poland.

== Events ==
League	Group	Venue	Men Winner	Women Winner
Super League		(Poland) Bydgoszcz	Germany	Russia
1st	A	(Bulgaria) Plovdiv	Czech Republic	Romania
1st	B	(Turkey) Istanbul	Spain	Italy
2nd	A	(Iceland) Reykjavík	Estonia	Ireland
2nd	B	(Serbia and Montenegro) Novi Sad	Serbia and Montenegro	Croatia

== Super League ==
=== Final standings ===
Men
Pos.	Team	Points
1	Germany	107.5
2	France	105
3	Poland	104
4	Great Britain	102.5
5	Russia	99
6	Italy	72
7	Sweden	67
8	Netherlands	62

Women
Pos.	Team	Points
1	Russia	142
2	Ukraine	97
3	France	92.5
4	Germany	92
5	Poland	86.5
6	Greece	79
7	Spain	66
8	Great Britain	63

=== Men's events ===
Event	Gold		Silver		Bronze	
100 m (Wind: -3.2 m/s)	Łukasz Chyła; Poland	10.42	Ronald Pognon; France	10.43	Ronny Ostwald; Germany	10.49
200 m (Wind: 0.0 m/s)	Christian Malcolm; Great Britain	20.56	Johan Wissman; Sweden	20.61	Marco Torrieri; Italy	20.62
400 m	Tim Benjamin; Great Britain	45.37	Ingo Schultz; Germany	45.50	Leslie Djhone; France	45.73
800 m	Florent Lacasse; France	1:45.19	René Herms; Germany	1:45.27	Arnoud Okken; Netherlands	1:45.64
1500 m	Mehdi Baala; France	3:49.13	Michael East; Great Britain	3:49.53	Yuriy Borzakovskiy; Russia	3:50.99
3000 m	Wolfram Müller; Germany	8:04.37	Gert-Jan Liefers; Netherlands	8:04.41	Vyacheslav Shabunin; Russia	8:05.92
5000 m	John Mayock; Great Britain	14:44.71	Sergey Ivanov; Russia	14:44.75	Mokhtar Benhari; France	14:44.78
3000 m steeplechase	Bouabdellah Tahri; France	8:23.40	Jakub Czaja; Poland	8:25.51	Giuseppe Maffei; Italy	8:27.53
110 m hurdles (Wind: -1.0 m/s)	Robert Kronberg; Sweden	13.58	Mike Fenner; Germany	13.66	Andrea Giaconi; Italy	13.66
400 m hurdles	Chris Rawlinson; Great Britain	48.59	Naman Keïta; France	49.04	Boris Gorban; Russia	49.71
4 × 100 m	Great Britain; Christian Malcolm; Darren Campbell; Chris Lambert; Mark Lewis-Francis	38.67	Poland; Zbigniew Tulin; Łukasz Chyła; Marcin Jędrusiński; Marcin Urbaś	38.68	Germany; Alexander Kosenkow; Ronny Ostwald; Tobias Unger; Till Helmke	38.76
4 × 400 m	Germany; Ingo Schultz; Kamghe Gaba; Ruwen Faller; Bastian Swillims	3:01.78	Russia; Anton Galkin; Andrey Rudnitskiy; Aleksandr Usov; Ruslan Mashchenko	3:01.88	Poland; Piotr Klimczak; Artur Gąsiewski; Marcin Marciniszyn; Robert Maćkowiak	3:02.05
High jump	Stefan Holm; Sweden	2.32	Grzegorz Sposób; Poland	2.32	Roman Fricke; Germany	2.27
Pole vault	Romain Mesnil; France	5.75	Patrik Kristiansson; Sweden	5.70	Lars Börgeling; Germany; Yevgeniy Mikhailichenko; Russia	5.65
Long jump	Chris Tomlinson; Great Britain	8.28w	Salim Sdiri; France	8.24	Vitaliy Shkurlatov; Russia	8.13
Triple jump	Christian Olsson; Sweden	17.30	Danila Burkenya; Russia	17.28	Phillips Idowu; Great Britain	17.10w
Shot put	Carl Myerscough; Great Britain	20.85	Rutger Smith; Netherlands	20.56	Ralf Bartels; Germany	20.54
Discus throw	Michael Möllenbeck; Germany	64.42	Rutger Smith; Netherlands	63.68	Carl Myerscough; Great Britain	61.68
Hammer throw	Szymon Ziółkowski; Poland	77.27	Markus Esser; Germany	76.97	Nicola Vizzoni; Italy	76.16
Javelin throw	Aleksandr Ivanov; Russia	82.55	Peter Esenwein; Germany	82.43	Francesco Pignata; Italy	76.87
WR world record | AR area record | CR championship record | GR games record | NR national record | OR Olympic record | PB personal best | SB season best | WL world leading (in a given season)

=== Women's events ===
Event	Gold		Silver		Bronze	
100 m (Wind: -1.9 m/s)	Christine Arron; France	11.23	Yuliya Tabakova; Russia	11.39	Glory Alozie; Spain	11.49
200 m (Wind: 0.6 m/s)	Muriel Hurtis; France	22.78	Natalya Antyukh; Russia	22.83	Anzhela Kravchenko; Ukraine	23.10
400 m	Olga Kotlyarova; Russia	50.09	Antonina Yefremova; Ukraine	51.79	Solen Désert; France	52.09
800 m	Olga Raspopova; Russia	2:00.24	Claudia Gesell; Germany	2:01.27	Susan Scott; Great Britain	2:01.35
1500 m	Iris María Fuentes-Pila; Spain	4:08.05	Maria Martins; France	4:08.12	Yuliya Kosenkova; Russia	4:08.59
3000 m	Gulnara Samitova; Russia	8:49.48	Lidia Chojecka; Poland	8:52.60	Zulema Fuentes-Pila; Spain	8:59.20
5000 m	Paula Radcliffe; Great Britain	14:29.11; CR, NR	Liliya Shobukhova; Russia	14:52.19	Sabrina Mockenhaupt; Germany	15:23.50
3000 m steeplechase	Élodie Olivarès; France	9:41.81	Lyubov Ivanova; Russia	9:44.95	Rosa María Morató; Spain	9:51.08
100 m hurdles (Wind: -1.0 m/s)	Yelena Krasovska; Ukraine	12.78	Irina Shevchenko; Russia	12.91	Glory Alozie; Spain	12.95
400 m hurdles	Fani Halkia; Greece	54.16	Yekaterina Bikert; Russia	54.60	Małgorzata Pskit; Poland	55.68
4 × 100 m	France; Véronique Mang; Muriel Hurtis; Sylviane Félix; Christine Arron	42.41	Russia; Olga Fedorova; Yuliya Tabakova; Irina Khabarova; Larisa Kruglova	42.93	Ukraine; Tetyana Tkalich; Anzhela Kravchenko; Oksana Kaydash; Iryna Shepetyuk	43.43
4 × 400 m	Russia; Yuliya Gushchina; Natalya Ivanova; Yekaterina Bakhvalova; Tatyana Levina	3:26.04	Ukraine; Oleksandra Ryzhkova; Oksana Ilyushkina; Antonina Yefremova; Nataliya Pyhyda	3:26.28	Greece; Olga Kaidantzi; Hrisoula Goudenoudi; Hariklia Bouda; Fani Halkia	3:26.33; NR
High jump	Yelena Slesarenko; Russia	2.04	Irina Mikhalchenko; Ukraine	1.92	Ariane Friedrich; Germany	1.92
Pole vault	Anzhela Balakhonova; Ukraine	4.50	Monika Pyrek; Poland	4.40	Tatyana Polnova; Russia	4.30
Long jump	Irina Simagina; Russia	6.91	Kelly Sotherton; Great Britain	6.68	Ioanna Kafetzi; Greece	6.56
Triple jump	Anna Pyatykh; Russia	14.85	Chrysopigi Devetzi; Greece	14.81w	Yelena Govorova; Ukraine	14.78
Shot put	Olga Ryabinkina; Russia	18.92	Kalliopi Ouzouni; Greece	18.45	Nadine Kleinert; Germany	18.44
Discus throw	Ekaterini Vogoli; Greece	64.25	Franka Dietzsch; Germany	61.42	Joanna Wiśniewska; Poland	60.51
Hammer throw	Irina Sekachova; Ukraine	71.91	Olga Kuzenkova; Russia	70.89	Betty Heidler; Germany	70.05
Javelin throw	Angeliki Tsiolakoudi; Greece	62.80	Steffi Nerius; Germany	59.42	Valeriya Zabruskova; Russia	58.88
WR world record | AR area record | CR championship record | GR games record | NR national record | OR Olympic record | PB personal best | SB season best | WL world leading (in a given season)

== First League ==
=== Group A ===
19–20 June 2004 (Bulgaria) Plovdiv

Men
Pos.	Team	Points
1	Czech Republic	110
2	Ukraine	108
3	Romania	104.5
4	Belgium	101
5	Greece	97
6	Croatia	76
7	Belarus	72.5
8	Bulgaria	47

Women
Pos.	Team	Points
1	Romania	130
2	Bulgaria	122
3	Belarus	104
4	Czech Republic	94
5	Sweden	90
6	Belgium	81
7	Estonia	48
8	Latvia	45

=== Group B ===
19–20 June 2004 (Turkey) Istanbul

Men
Pos.	Team	Points
1	Spain	129
2	Finland	103
3	Hungary	95.5
4	Slovenia	94
5	Portugal	82
6	Switzerland	80.5
7	Norway	67.5
8	Austria	63.5

Women
Pos.	Team	Points
1	Italy	126.5
2	Finland	104
3	Hungary	101
4	Portugal	88
5	Netherlands	82
6	Slovenia	79
7	Switzerland	77
8	Turkey	62.5

== Second League ==
=== Group A ===
19–20 June 2004 (Iceland) Reykjavík

Men
Pos.	Team	Points
1	Estonia	126.5
2	Ireland	121
3	Denmark	104
4	Cyprus	94
5	Iceland	80
6	Luxembourg	67.5
7	Lithuania	58
8	AASSE	49

Women
Pos.	Team	Points
1	Ireland	118
2	Norway	109.5
3	Austria	103
4	Denmark	98
5	Cyprus	92.5
6	Lithuania	76
7	Iceland	70
8	AASSE	42

=== Group B ===
19–20 June 2004 (Serbia and Montenegro) Novi Sad

Men
Pos.	Team	Points
1	Serbia and Montenegro	193.5
2	Slovakia	183.5
3	Latvia	172.5
4	Israel	164
5	Turkey	164
6	Moldova	143
7	Bosnia and Herzegovina	113
8	Azerbaijan	110
9	Armenia	84.5
10	Albania	82.5
11	Georgia	80
12	Macedonia	44.5

Women
Pos.	Team	Points
1	Serbia and Montenegro	185
2	Croatia	184
3	Slovakia	181
4	Moldova	128
5	Israel	121.5
6	Bosnia and Herzegovina	109
7	Georgia	104
8	Albania	88
9	Armenia	80
10	Macedonia	54.5
11	Azerbaijan	49
