= 2002 European Athletics Championships – Women's 200 metres =

Women's 200 metres at the European Athletics Championships

The women's 200 metres at the 2002 European Athletics Championships were held at the Olympic Stadium on August 8–9.

== Medalists ==
Gold	Silver	Bronze
Muriel Hurtis; France	Kim Gevaert; Belgium	Manuela Levorato; Italy

== Results ==
=== Heats ===
Qualification: First 3 of each heat (Q) and the next 4 fastest (q) qualified for the semifinals.

Wind:
Heat 1: -1.1 m/s, Heat 2: -0.6 m/s, Heat 3: 0.0 m/s, Heat 4: -0.8 m/s

Rank	Heat	Name	Nationality	Time	Notes
1	1	Muriel Hurtis	France	22.86	Q
2	4	Kim Gevaert	Belgium	22.97	Q
3	2	Karin Mayr	Austria	23.03	Q
3	3	Sylviane Félix	France	23.03	Q
5	3	Manuela Levorato	Italy	23.10	Q
6	1	Gabi Rockmeier	Germany	23.24	Q
6	3	Yuliya Tabakova	Russia	23.24	Q
8	1	Ciara Sheehy	Ireland	23.25	Q
9	2	Daniela Graglia	Italy	23.33	Q, PB
9	3	Ekaterina Tosheva-Mashova	Bulgaria	23.33	q
11	4	Alenka Bikar	Slovenia	23.35	Q
12	3	Olga Kaidantzi	Greece	23.37	q
13	2	Fabe Dia	France	23.39	Q
14	2	Jacqueline Poelman	Netherlands	23.41	q
15	1	Shani Anderson	Great Britain	23.42	q
16	2	Johanna Manninen	Finland	23.47	
17	4	Irina Khabarova	Russia	23.53	Q
18	4	Monika Gachevska	Bulgaria	23.62	
19	2	Natallia Safronnikava	Belarus	23.69	
20	1	Zuzanna Radecka	Poland	23.71	
21	2	Enikő Szabó	Hungary	23.78	
22	1	Jenny Kallur	Sweden	23.96	
23	3	Sarah Reilly	Ireland	24.03	
23	1	Barbara Petráhn	Hungary	24.31	
24	3	Klodiana Shala	Albania	24.93	
	4	Ionela Târlea	Romania	DNF	
	4	Jovana Miljković	Yugoslavia	DNS	

=== Semifinals ===
Qualification: First 4 of each semifinal (Q) qualified directly for the final.

Wind:
Heat 1: +1.0 m/s, Heat 2: 0.0 m/s

Rank	Heat	Name	Nationality	Time	Notes
1	1	Muriel Hurtis	France	22.46	Q
2	2	Kim Gevaert	Belgium	22.73	Q
3	2	Sylviane Félix	France	22.78	Q
4	1	Manuela Levorato	Italy	22.93	Q
5	1	Karin Mayr	Austria	22.99	Q
6	2	Gabi Rockmeier	Germany	23.07	Q
7	2	Jacqueline Poelman	Netherlands	23.14	Q
8	1	Alenka Bikar	Slovenia	23.18	Q
9	2	Daniela Graglia	Italy	23.20	
10	2	Yuliya Tabakova	Russia	23.32	
11	2	Olga Kaidantzi	Greece	23.39	
12	1	Ciara Sheehy	Ireland	23.47	
13	1	Ekaterina Tosheva-Mashova	Bulgaria	23.48	
14	2	Fabe Dia	France	23.50	
15	1	Irina Khabarova	Russia	23.59	
16	1	Shani Anderson	Great Britain	23.60	

=== Final ===
Wind: -0.3 m/s

Rank	Name	Nationality	Time	Notes
1st place, gold medalist(s)	Muriel Hurtis	France	22.43	
2nd place, silver medalist(s)	Kim Gevaert	Belgium	22.53	
3rd place, bronze medalist(s)	Manuela Levorato	Italy	22.75	
4	Sylviane Félix	France	22.89	
5	Gabi Rockmeier	Germany	23.00	
6	Karin Mayr	Austria	23.06	
7	Jacqueline Poelman	Netherlands	23.31	
8	Alenka Bikar	Slovenia	23.37	
