= 1998 World Junior Championships in Athletics – Women's 100 metres =

The women's 100 metres event at the 1998 World Junior Championships in Athletics was held in Annecy, France, at Parc des Sports on 28 and 29 July.

== Medalists ==
Gold	Shakedia Jones; United States
Silver	Angela Williams; United States
Bronze	Joan Ekah; Nigeria

== Results ==
=== Final ===
29 July
Wind: +1.7 m/s

Rank	Name	Nationality	Time	Notes
1st place, gold medalist(s)	Shakedia Jones	United States	11.19	
2nd place, silver medalist(s)	Angela Williams	United States	11.27	
3rd place, bronze medalist(s)	Joan Ekah	Nigeria	11.50	
4	Céline Thélamon	France	11.58	
5	Tulia Robinson	Jamaica	11.63	
6	Fana Ashby	Trinidad and Tobago	11.65	
7	Funmilola Ogundana	Nigeria	11.68	
8	Olesya Zykina	Russia	11.88	

=== Semifinals ===
29 July

==== Semifinal 1 ====
Wind: +1.1 m/s

Rank	Name	Nationality	Time	Notes
1	Shakedia Jones	United States	11.40	Q
2	Joan Ekah	Nigeria	11.59	Q
3	Fana Ashby	Trinidad and Tobago	11.63	Q
4	Céline Thélamon	France	11.65	Q
5	Sonia Williams	Antigua and Barbuda	11.70	
6	Johanna Manninen	Finland	11.75	
7	Petronella Árva	Hungary	11.79	
8	Sina Schielke	Germany	11.82	

==== Semifinal 2 ====
Wind: +0.7 m/s

Rank	Name	Nationality	Time	Notes
1	Angela Williams	United States	11.40	Q
2	Tulia Robinson	Jamaica	11.60	Q
3	Funmilola Ogundana	Nigeria	11.75	Q
4	Olesya Zykina	Russia	11.88	Q
5	Zeng Xiujun	China	11.88	
6	Enikő Szabó	Hungary	11.88	
7	Anne Carole Rapp	France	11.93	
8	Lyubov Perepelova	Uzbekistan	12.15	

=== Quarterfinals ===
28 July

==== Quarterfinal 1 ====
Wind: -0.3 m/s

Rank	Name	Nationality	Time	Notes
1	Angela Williams	United States	11.69	Q
2	Fana Ashby	Trinidad and Tobago	11.70	Q
3	Tulia Robinson	Jamaica	11.84	Q
4	Enikő Szabó	Hungary	11.89	Q
5	Sina Schielke	Germany	11.93	q
6	Nathalie Beaubrun	Canada	12.06	
7	Erica Marchetti	Italy	12.11	
8	Heidi Hannula	Finland	12.19	

==== Quarterfinal 2 ====
Wind: -0.1 m/s

Rank	Name	Nationality	Time	Notes
1	Joan Ekah	Nigeria	11.64	Q
2	Sonia Williams	Antigua and Barbuda	11.68	Q
3	Shakedia Jones	United States	11.70	Q
4	Olesya Zykina	Russia	11.84	Q
5	Anne Carole Rapp	France	11.99	q
6	Lyubov Perepelova	Uzbekistan	12.00	q
7	Tamicka Clarke	Bahamas	12.14	
8	Olga Nikitenko	Kazakhstan	12.17	

==== Quarterfinal 3 ====
Wind: -0.7 m/s

Rank	Name	Nationality	Time	Notes
1	Zeng Xiujun	China	11.74	Q
2	Funmilola Ogundana	Nigeria	11.84	Q
3	Céline Thélamon	France	11.88	Q
4	Johanna Manninen	Finland	11.92	Q
5	Petronella Árva	Hungary	11.99	q
6	Veronica Campbell	Jamaica	12.04	
7	Annegret Dietrich	Germany	12.15	
8	Edyta Rela	Poland	42.31	

=== Heats ===
28 July

==== Heat 1 ====
Wind: -1.9 m/s

Rank	Name	Nationality	Time	Notes
1	Zeng Xiujun	China	11.97	Q
2	Joan Ekah	Nigeria	12.05	Q
3	Anne Carole Rapp	France	12.19	Q
4	Veronica Campbell	Jamaica	12.25	Q
5	Anais Oyembo	Gabon	12.84	
6	Cristina Marani	San Marino	13.44	

==== Heat 2 ====
Wind: +0.3 m/s

Rank	Name	Nationality	Time	Notes
1	Angela Williams	United States	11.66	Q
2	Sina Schielke	Germany	11.74	Q
3	Petronella Árva	Hungary	11.80	Q
4	Olga Nikitenko	Kazakhstan	12.06	Q
5	Tamicka Clarke	Bahamas	12.19	q
6	Desiree Cooks	Anguilla	12.67	
7	Aminata Bangura	Sierra Leone	13.11	
8	Phetsamone Paseuthxay	Laos	13.62	

==== Heat 3 ====
Wind: -1.3 m/s

Rank	Name	Nationality	Time	Notes
1	Shakedia Jones	United States	11.86	Q
2	Johanna Manninen	Finland	11.88	Q
3	Tulia Robinson	Jamaica	11.95	Q
4	Enikő Szabó	Hungary	12.08	Q
5	Erica Marchetti	Italy	12.30	q
6	Jineill O'Neil	Saint Lucia	12.80	
7	Shamha Ahmed	Maldives	13.58	

==== Heat 4 ====
Wind: +1.1 m/s

Rank	Name	Nationality	Time	Notes
1	Edyta Rela	Poland	11.79	Q
2	Olesya Zykina	Russia	11.93	Q
3	Annegret Dietrich	Germany	11.94	Q
4	Funmilola Ogundana	Nigeria	11.98	Q
5	Céline Thélamon	France	12.00	q
6	Lyubov Perepelova	Uzbekistan	12.03	q
7	Hiranisha Rasimuddin	Singapore	12.69	

==== Heat 5 ====
Wind: -1.3 m/s

Rank	Name	Nationality	Time	Notes
1	Sonia Williams	Antigua and Barbuda	11.80	Q
2	Fana Ashby	Trinidad and Tobago	11.83	Q
3	Heidi Hannula	Finland	12.06	Q
4	Nathalie Beaubrun	Canada	12.12	Q
5	Juanita Ferguson	Bahamas	12.33	
6	Nino Bagashvili	Georgia	12.35	
7	Karen Richards	Saint Vincent and the Grenadines	12.93	

== Participation ==
According to an unofficial count, 35 athletes from 27 countries participated in the event.

- Anguilla (1)
- Antigua and Barbuda (1)
- Bahamas (2)
- Canada (1)
- China (1)
- Finland (2)
- France (2)
- Gabon (1)
- Georgia (1)
- Germany (2)
- Hungary (2)
- Italy (1)
- Jamaica (2)
- Kazakhstan (1)
- Laos (1)
- Maldives (1)
- Nigeria (2)
- Poland (1)
- Russia (1)
- Saint Lucia (1)
- Saint Vincent and the Grenadines (1)
- San Marino (1)
- Sierra Leone (1)
- Singapore (1)
- Trinidad and Tobago (1)
- United States (2)
- Uzbekistan (1)
