= 2004 IAAF World Indoor Championships – Women's 200 metres =

The women's 200 metres event at the 2004 IAAF World Indoor Championships was held on March 6–7.

== Medalists ==
Gold	Silver	Bronze
Natallia Safronnikava; Belarus	Svetlana Goncharenko; Russia	Karin Mayr-Krifka; Austria

Note: Anastasiya Kapachinskaya of Russia originally won the gold medal, but was disqualified after she tested positive for performance enhancing drugs.

== Results ==
=== Heat ===
First 2 of each heat (Q) and next 2 fastest (q) qualified for the semifinals.

Rank	Heat	Name	Nationality	Time	Notes
1	4	Natallia Safronnikava	Belarus	23.03	Q, SB
2	2	Svetlana Goncharenko	Russia	23.08	Q, SB
DQ	1	Anastasiya Kapachinskaya	Russia	~~23.10~~	Doping
DQ	2	Crystal Cox	United States	~~23.23~~	Doping
3	4	Maryna Maydanova	Ukraine	23.34	Q
4	4	Alenka Bikar	Slovenia	23.36	q, SB
5	3	Karin Mayr-Krifka	Austria	23.38	Q
6	1	Nataliya Pyhyda	Ukraine	23.39	Q
7	3	Juliet Campbell	Jamaica	23.51	Q
8	3	Rachelle Boone-Smith	United States	23.59	q
9	2	Nikolett Listár	Hungary	23.71	PB
10	2	Johanna Manninen	Finland	23.79	
11	1	Ciara Sheehy	Ireland	23.86	
12	1	Gretta Taslakian	Lebanon	25.80	NR
13	3	Yulia Novita Novita	Indonesia	26.69	NR
	4	Vida Anim	Ghana	DNS	

=== Semifinals ===
First 3 of each semifinal (Q) qualified for the final.

Rank	Heat	Name	Nationality	Time	Notes
DQ	2	Anastasiya Kapachinskaya	Russia	~~22.86~~	Doping
1	2	Natallia Safronnikava	Belarus	22.96	Q, SB
2	1	Karin Mayr-Krifka	Austria	23.11	Q
3	1	Svetlana Goncharenko	Russia	23.13	Q
4	2	Nataliya Pyhyda	Ukraine	23.46	Q
5	2	Alenka Bikar	Slovenia	23.46	
6	1	Maryna Maydanova	Ukraine	23.47	Q
7	1	Rachelle Boone-Smith	United States	23.53	
DQ	2	Crystal Cox	United States	~~23.55~~	Doping
	1	Juliet Campbell	Jamaica	DNS	

=== Final ===
Rank	Lane	Name	Nationality	Time	React	Notes
DQ	6	Anastasiya Kapachinskaya	Russia	~~22.78~~	0.242	Doping
1st place, gold medalist(s)	3	Natallia Safronnikava	Belarus	23.13	0.149	
2nd place, silver medalist(s)	4	Svetlana Goncharenko	Russia	23.15	0.139	
3rd place, bronze medalist(s)	5	Karin Mayr-Krifka	Austria	23.18	0.179	
4	2	Maryna Maydanova	Ukraine	23.64	0.218	
5	1	Nataliya Pyhyda	Ukraine	23.80	0.174	
