= 2000 European Athletics Indoor Championships – Women's 200 metres =

The women's 200 metres event at the 2000 European Athletics Indoor Championships was held on February 25–26.

== Medalists ==
Gold	Silver	Bronze
Muriel Hurtis; France	Alenka Bikar; Slovenia	Yekaterina Leshcheva; Russia

== Results ==
=== Heats ===
First 2 of each heat (Q) and the next 5 fastest (q) qualified for the semifinals.

Rank	Heat	Name	Nationality	Time	Notes
1	5	Yekaterina Leshcheva	Russia	23.21	Q
2	3	Muriel Hurtis	France	23.23	Q
3	1	Nora Güner	Turkey	23.29	Q
4	2	Birgit Rockmeier	Germany	23.33	Q
4	3	Natalya Voronova	Russia	23.33	Q
6	2	Irina Khabarova	Russia	23.35	Q
7	2	Alenka Bikar	Slovenia	23.40	q
8	4	Fabé Dia	France	23.50	Q
9	4	Mireille Donders	Switzerland	23.56	Q
10	1	Catherine Murphy	Great Britain	23.57	Q
11	4	Joice Maduaka	Great Britain	23.58	q
12	5	Zuzanna Radecka	Poland	23.60	Q
13	3	Johanna Manninen	Finland	23.62	q
14	4	Olena Pastushenko	Ukraine	23.89	q
15	1	Ciara Sheehy	Ireland	23.93	q, PB
16	5	Christine Bloomfield	Great Britain	23.99	
17	3	Daniela Graglia	Italy	24.23	
18	2	Ekaterini Koffa	Greece	24.32	
19	5	Irina Lenskiy	Israel	25.13	
	1	Esther Möller	Germany	DNF	

=== Semifinals ===
First 2 of each semifinals qualified directly (Q) for the final.

Rank	Heat	Name	Nationality	Time	Notes
1	2	Muriel Hurtis	France	23.03	Q, SB
2	1	Birgit Rockmeier	Germany	23.17	Q
2	3	Yekaterina Leshcheva	Russia	23.17	Q
4	2	Alenka Bikar	Slovenia	23.19	Q, NR
5	2	Natalya Voronova	Russia	23.25	
6	3	Fabé Dia	France	23.34	Q
7	1	Irina Khabarova	Russia	23.44	Q
8	2	Mireille Donders	Switzerland	23.47	
9	3	Zuzanna Radecka	Poland	23.55	
10	1	Catherine Murphy	Great Britain	23.60	
11	3	Joice Maduaka	Great Britain	23.63	
12	3	Johanna Manninen	Finland	23.83	
13	1	Ciara Sheehy	Ireland	23.92	
14	2	Olena Pastushenko	Ukraine	24.15	
	1	Nora Güner	Turkey	DQ	

=== Final ===
Rank	Name	Nationality	Reaction	Time	Notes
1st place, gold medalist(s)	Muriel Hurtis	France	0.136	23.06	
2nd place, silver medalist(s)	Alenka Bikar	Slovenia	0.178	23.16	NR
3rd place, bronze medalist(s)	Yekaterina Leshcheva	Russia	0.172	23.10	
4	Birgit Rockmeier	Germany	0.121	23.29	
5	Irina Khabarova	Russia	0.172	23.64	
6	Fabé Dia	France	0.156	24.38	
