= Olga Kaidantzi =

Greek sprinter (born 1979)

Olga Kaidantzi (Greek: Όλγα Καϊδαντζή; born 17 July 1979) is a Greek sprinter who specialized in 200 metres competitions.

She reached the semi-finals in Athletics at the 2004 Summer Olympics – Women's 200 metres, and was a member of the Greek 4×100 metres relay team which finished sixth in the 2001 World Championships in Athletics along with Georgia Kokloni, Frosso Patsou, and Ekaterini Thanou. She participated in the 2002 European Athletics Championships and made it through the semi-finals.

After a long break (2005–2008) due to various serious injuries, Kaidantzi came back in 2009 to become the best Greek sprinter in the 200 metre event, winning the title of Greek outdoor champion with a time of 23.93 seconds. She is a five-time Greek champion in the 200 metre race (2001, 2002, 2003, 2004 & 2009). Her personal best time since 12 June 2004 is 22.88 seconds. This places her second in the list of all-time Greek performers behind Ekaterini Koffa.

== Honours ==
Year	Competition	Venue	Position	Event	Notes
Representing Greece
1998	World Junior Championships	Annecy, France	16th (sf)	200m	24.63 (wind: -0.7 m/s)
2001	European U23 Championships	Amsterdam, Netherlands	5th	200m	23.79 (wind: -0.3 m/s)
2001	European U23 Championships	Amsterdam, Netherlands	5th	4x100 m relay	45.11
2001	Mediterranean Games	Rades, Tunisia	4th	200 m	23.71 w
2001	Mediterranean Games	Rades, Tunisia	3rd	4 x 100 m relay	44.97
2001	World Championships	Edmonton, Canada	6th	4 x 100 m relay	43.25 SB
2002	European Athletics Championships	Munich, Germany	11th (sf)	200 m	23.39
2004	European Cup	Bydgoszcz, Poland	6th	200 m	
2004	Olympic Games	Athens, Greece	15th (sf)	200 m	23.30

=== Personal information ===
Place of birth: Athina, Attiki, Greece
Height: 5'8" (172 cm)
Weight: 128 lbs (58 kg)

=== Personal bests ===
60 metres	100 metres	200 metres
7,43 sec	11,56 sec	22,88 sec
