= Michelle Collins (sprinter) =

American sprinter

Personal information
- Nationality: American
- Born: February 12, 1971 (age 55)
- Height: 1.77 m (5 ft 10 in)

Sport
- Sport: Running
- Events: 200 meters, 400 meters,

Achievements and titles
- Personal best: 200 m: 22.18 s (indoor) 400 m: 50.02 s
Medal record
Women's athletics
Representing the United States
World Championships
Gold medal – first place	1993 Stuttgart	4x400 m relay
Gold medal – first place	1997 Athens	4x400 m relay
Silver medal – second place	1999 Seville	4x400 m relay
Summer Universiade
Gold medal – first place	1993 Buffalo	400 m
Gold medal – first place	1993 Buffalo	4x400 m relay
Bronze medal – third place	1991 Sheffield	200 m
Pan American Games
Silver medal – second place	1999 Winnipeg	400 m
Silver medal – second place	1999 Winnipeg	4x400 m relay
World Indoor Championships
Disqualified	2003 Birmingham	200 metres

Michelle Collins (also spelled Michele; born February 12, 1971) is an American track and field athlete, known for long sprints. She was the 2003 World Indoor Champion at 200 metres. Her 22.18 from that meet would clearly be an American record, but it was never ratified. Her career came to an apparent end when she was handed an 8-year suspension for using performance-enhancing drugs, after she was linked to the BALCO scandal. She never tested positive but admitted using THG and EPO. Her results were retroactively disqualified. After some legal wrangling, Collins threatened to appeal the decision by USADA. She agreed to drop her appeal and her suspension was reduced to the more conventional 4-year ban.
