= Ciara Sheehy =

Irish sprinter

Personal information
- Born: 12 August 1980 (age 46) Dublin, Ireland
- Height: 1.69 m (5 ft 7 in)
- Weight: 59 kg (130 lb)

Sport
- Sport: Athletics
- Events: 60m, 100 m, 200 m
- Club: Dublin City Harriers

Ciara Sheehy (born 12 August 1980, in Dublin) is a retired Irish sprinter who competed primarily in the 200 metres. She represented her country at the 2000 Summer Olympics, as well as one outdoor and two indoor World Championships.

== Competition record ==
Year	Competition	Venue	Position	Event	Notes
Representing Ireland
1997	European Youth Olympic Days	Lisbon, Portugal	1st	200 m	24.11 (w)
1998	World Junior Championships	Annecy, France	29th (qf)	200 m	24.71
1999	European Junior Championships	Riga, Latvia	3rd	200 m	23.49
1999	World Championships	Seville, Spain	36th (h)	200 m	23.54
2000	European Indoor Championships	Ghent, Belgium	13th (sf)	200 m	23.92
2000	Olympic Games	Sydney, Australia	16th (h)	4 × 400 m relay	3:32.24
2001	European U23 Championships	Amsterdam, Netherlands	3rd	200 m	23.54
2002	European Indoor Championships	Vienna, Austria	8th (sf)	200 m	23.62
2002	European Championships	Munich, Germany	12th (sf)	200 m	23.47
2003	World Indoor Championships	Birmingham, United Kingdom	6th (sf)	200 m	23.23
2004	World Indoor Championships	Budapest, Hungary	11th (h)	200 m	23.86
2004	World Indoor Championships	Budapest, Hungary	9th (h)	4 × 400 m relay	3:34.61
2005	European Indoor Championships	Madrid, Spain	10th (h)	200 m	23.73
2006	European Championships	Gothenburg, Sweden	–	200 m	DNF

== Personal bests ==
Outdoor

- 100 metres – 11.52 (+1.2 m/s) (Fribourg 2003)
- 200 metres – 23.21 (+0.9 m/s) (Germiston 2002)

Indoor

- 60 metres – 7.45 (Belfast 2003)
- 200 metres – 23.17 (Birmingham 2003) NR
