= Daniela Graglia =

Italian sprinter and runner (born 1976)

Personal information
- Nationality: Italian
- Born: 26 May 1976 (age 50) Fossano, Italy
- Height: 1.63 m (5 ft 4 in)
- Weight: 50 kg (110 lb)

Sport
- Country: Italy
- Sport: Athletics
- Events: Sprint; Middle distance running
- Club: Cus Torino

Achievements and titles
- Personal bests: 100 m: 11.51 (2002); 200 m: 23.20 (2002); 400 m: 52.79 (2000); 60 m indoor: 7.31 (2007); 200 m indoor: 23.54 (2003)
Medal record
European Cup
Bronze medal – third place	2002 Annecy	4x400 m relay

Daniela Graglia (born 26 May 1976 in Fossano) is a former Italian sprinter and middle distance runner.

== Biography ==
Daniela Graglia participated at one edition of the Summer Olympics (2000), she has 24 caps in national team from 2000 to 2008.

== Achievements ==
Year	Competition	Venue	Position	Event	Performance	Note
2000	European Indoor Championships	(Spain) Madrid	Heat	200 metres	24.23	
2000	Olympic Games	(Australia) Sydney	Heat	4x400 metres relay	3:27.23	
2001	World Indoor Championships	(Portugal) Lisbon	SF	60 metres	7.42	
2002	European Championships	(Germany) Munich	SF	200 metres	23.33	
2002	European Championships	(Germany) Munich	6th	4x100 metres relay	43.46	
2003	World Indoor Championships	(United Kingdom) Birmingham	Heat	200 metres	23.66	
2005	European Indoor Championships	(Spain) Madrid	Heat	200 metres	23.90	
2007	European Indoor Championships	(United Kingdom) Birmingham	Heat	60 metres	7.42	

== National titles ==
Daniela Graglia has won 11 times the individual national championship.

- 1 win on 100 metres (2003)
- 3 wins on 200 metres (2000, 2003, 2006)
- 2 wins on 400 metres (2001, 2002)
- 2 wins on 60 metres indoor (2005, 2007)
- 3 wins on 200 metres indoor (2000, 2001, 2005)

== See also ==
- Italy national relay team
- Italian all-time lists - 200 metres
- Italian all-time lists - 4x100 metres relay
