= Sonia Williams =

Track and field athlete from Antigua and Barbuda

Personal information
- Born: May 28, 1979 (age 46) St. John's, Antigua and Barbuda

Sport
- Sport: Track and field

Sonia Olivia Williams (born May 28, 1979) is a female track and field sprint athlete who competes internationally for Antigua and Barbuda.

Williams competed for the Barton Cougars track and field team in the NJCAA before transferring to Texas Christian University to compete for the TCU Horned Frogs track and field team in the NCAA.

Williams was born in St. Johns, and represented Antigua and Barbuda at the 2008 Summer Olympics in Beijing. She competed in the 100 metres sprint and placed sixth in her heat without advancing to the second round. She ran the distance in a time of 12.04 seconds.

== International competitions ==
Year	Competition	Venue	Position	Event	Notes
Representing Antigua and Barbuda
1994	CARIFTA Games (U-17)	Bridgetown, Barbados	8th	200 m	24.71
1994	CAC Junior Championships (U-17)	Port of Spain, Trinidad and Tobago	7th	100 m	11.9 (−0.4 m/s)
1994	CAC Junior Championships (U-17)	Port of Spain, Trinidad and Tobago	7th	200 m	25.5 (−2.3 m/s)
1995	CARIFTA Games (U-17)	George Town, Cayman Islands	1st	100 m	11.76 (0.2 m/s)
1995	CARIFTA Games (U-17)	George Town, Cayman Islands	1st	200 m	23.99 (0.2 m/s)
1996	CARIFTA Games (U-20)	Kingston, Jamaica	4th	100 m	11.53 (0.9 m/s)
1996	CARIFTA Games (U-20)	Kingston, Jamaica	4th	200 m	24.49 (−4.4 m/s)
1996	CAC Junior Championships (U-20)	San Salvador, El Salvador	1st	100 m	11.49 (0.7 m/s)
1996	CAC Junior Championships (U-20)	San Salvador, El Salvador	1st	200 m	23.96 (0.6 m/s)
1996	Olympic Games	Atlanta, United States	—	4 × 100 m relay	DSQ
1996	Olympic Games	Atlanta, United States	6th (h)	4 × 400 m relay	3:44.98
1996	World Junior Championships	Sydney, Australia	7th (sf)	100m	11.67
1996	World Junior Championships	Sydney, Australia	25th (qf)	200m	24.87 (wind: -1.2 m/s)
1997	CARIFTA Games (U-20)	Bridgetown, Barbados	3rd	100 m	11.83 (0.0 m/s)
1998	CARIFTA Games (U-20)	Port of Spain, Trinidad and Tobago	5th	100 m	11.68
1998	CARIFTA Games (U-20)	Port of Spain, Trinidad and Tobago	5th	200 m	24.08 w (2.4 m/s)
1998	CAC Junior Championships (U-20)	George Town, Cayman Islands	3rd	100 m	11.68 (0.7 m/s)
1998	CAC Junior Championships (U-20)	George Town, Cayman Islands	2nd	200 m	23.86 (0.7 m/s)
1998	World Junior Championships	Annecy, France	7th (sf)	100 m	11.70 (wind: +1.1 m/s)
1998	World Junior Championships	Annecy, France	30th (qf)	200 m	24.79 (wind: +0.7 m/s)
1998	Central American and Caribbean Games	Maracaibo, Venezuela	10th (h)	100 m	11.62
1998	Central American and Caribbean Games	Maracaibo, Venezuela	10th (h)	200 m	24.35
2006	Commonwealth Games	Melbourne, Australia	8th (sf)	100 m	12.05 (1.4 m/s)
2007	Pan American Games	Rio de Janeiro, Brazil	6th (h)	100 m	11.89 w (2.1 m/s)
2008	Olympic Games	Beijing, PR China	6th (h)	100 m	12.04 (−1.4 m/s)
