= Sarah Wilhelmy =

British former sprinter (born 1980)

Personal information
- Nationality: British (English)
- Born: 2 February 1980 (age 46) Stepney, Greater London, England
- Height: 178 cm (5 ft 10 in)
- Weight: 62 kg (137 lb)

Sport
- Sport: Athletics
- Event: Sprints
- Club: Southend AC
Medal record
Representing Great Britain
Athletics
World Junior Championships
Bronze medal – third place	1998 Annecy	200 metres
European Junior Championships
Silver medal – second place	1997 Ljubljana	4 × 100 metres relay

Sarah Joanne Wilhelmy (born 2 February 1980) is a British former sprinter who competed at two Olympic Games.

== Biography ==
Born in Stepney, Greater London, Wilhelmy attended Southend High School for Girls, which is a grammar school with academy status, situated on Southchurch Boulevard in the east of Southend-on-Sea England.

Wilhelmy won the English Schools Under 15 Long jump title in 1993, with a jump of 5.70 metres, and went on to win the 200 metres at the English Schools in 1994 (U15) and 1996 (U17). She also won four AAAs junior titles: 60 metres indoors (U15 1994), (U17 1995) and 200 metres (U15 1994), (U20 1997). The highlight of her junior career was winning a bronze medal in the 200m at the 1998 IAAF World Junior Championships, in a race won by France's Muriel Hurtis.

Wilhelmy became the British 200 metres champion after winning the British AAA Championships title at the 2000 AAA Championships but failed to gain Olympic selection in that event as she didn't have the qualifying standard. She did however earn Olympic selection as part of the 4 × 100 m relay squad.

At the Olympic Games in Sydney, she represented the Great Britain team and ran in the first round heats before being replaced by Sam Davies for the semifinals.

Wilhelmy won the 2001 AAA Championships 100 metres title and at the 2001 World Championships in Athletics, she ran the second leg of the British 4 × 100 m team that finished fifth in the final in 42.60 seconds.

== International competitions ==
Year	Competition	Venue	Position	Event	Notes
Representing Great Britain
1997	European Junior Championships	Ljubljana, Slovenia	7th	200 m	23.92
1997	European Junior Championships	Ljubljana, Slovenia	2nd	4 × 100 m	45.55
1998	World Junior Championships	Annecy, France	3rd	200 m	23.56
1998	World Junior Championships	Annecy, France	4th	4 × 100 m	44.65
2000	Olympic Games	Sydney, Australia	heats	4 × 100 m	43.26
2001	World Championships	Edmonton, Canada	5th	4 × 100 m	42.60
