= Lineo Shoai =

Personal information
- Nationality: Lesotho
- Born: 10 March 1979 (age 46)

Sport
- Event: 200 metres

Lineo Florence Shoai (born 10 January 1979) is a Lesotho sprinter.

She competed in the 1996 Olympic Games, the 1999 World Championships, the 1999 All-Africa Games, the 2000 Olympic Games, the 2002 Commonwealth Games and the 2003 World Championships without progressing from the heat on either occasion.

With the Lesotho team she also participated in the 4 × 100 metres relay at the 1996 Olympic Games, but the team was disqualified.
