= Zeng Xiujun =

Chinese sprinter (born 1979)

Zeng Xiujun (born 10 February 1979) is a Chinese sprinter who specialized in the 100 metres. Her personal best time is 11.25 seconds, achieved in April 1998 in Chengdu.

She finished eighth in 4 × 100 m relay at the 2000 Olympic Games, together with teammates Liu Xiaomei, Qin Wangping and Li Xuemei. At the 2002 Asian Games she won a gold medal in relay; at the 2002 World Cup she finished seventh in the same event.

== Achievements ==
Year	Competition	Venue	Position	Event	Notes
Representing China
1998	World Junior Championships	Annecy, France	13th (sf)	100m	11.88 (wind: +0.7 m/s)
1998	World Junior Championships	Annecy, France	18th (qf)	200m	24.07 (wind: -1.1 m/s)
2001	East Asian Games	Osaka, Japan	1st	100 m	11.48
2001	East Asian Games	Osaka, Japan	1st	4 × 100 m relay	44.08
2001	World Student Games	Beijing, China	2nd	100 m	11.58
