= Joan Uduak Ekah =

Nigerian sprinter

Joan Uduak Ekah (born 16 December 1980 in Kaduna) is a retired Nigerian athlete specializing in the sprinting events. She competed in the 100 metres at the 2000 Summer Olympics reaching the second round.

With 7.09 she was the world junior record holder in the indoor 60 metres between 1999 and 2016 when the record was lowered to 7.07 by Ewa Swoboda.

== Competition record ==
Year	Competition	Venue	Position	Event	Notes
Representing Nigeria
1998	World Junior Championships	Annecy, France	3rd	100m	11.50 (wind: +1.7 m/s)
1998	World Junior Championships	Annecy, France	6th	200m	23.76 (wind: -1.1 m/s)
1999	World Indoor Championships	Maebashi, Japan	5th	60 m	7.10
1999	World Championships	Seville, Spain	–	4 × 100 m relay	DQ
1999	All-Africa Games	Johannesburg, South Africa	4th	100 m	11.26
2000	Olympic Games	Sydney, Australia	30th (qf)	100 m	11.67
2002	Commonwealth Games	Manchester, United Kingdom	12th (sf)	100 m	11.54
2002	Commonwealth Games	Manchester, United Kingdom	5th	4 × 100 m relay	44.10
2003	All-Africa Games	Abuja, Nigeria	7th	200 m	23.84

== Personal bests ==
Outdoor

- 100 metres – 11.11 (+1.1 m/s) (Lausanne 1999)
- 200 metres – 23.27 (-0.5 m/s) (Dijon 2000)

Indoor

- 60 metres – 7.09 (Maebashi 1999)
- 200 metres – 24.10 (Valencia 1999)
