= Hellena Wrappah =

Ghanaian sprinter (born 1973)

Personal information
- Nationality: Ghanaian
- Born: 12 September 1973 (age 52)

Sport
- Sport: Sprinting
- Event: 200 metres
Medal record
Women's athletics
Representing Ghana
African Championships
Bronze medal – third place	1993 Durban	4×400 m

Hellena Wrappah (born 12 September 1973) is a Ghanaian sprinter. She competed in the women's 200 metres at the 2000 Summer Olympics.
