= Fana Ashby =

Trinidad and Tobago sprinter

Personal information
- Born: 15 June 1981 (age 45) Diego Martin, Trinidad and Tobago

Sport
- Sport: Track and field
- Club: Auburn Tigers
Medal record
Representing Trinidad and Tobago
World Junior Championships
Bronze medal – third place	2000 Santiago	100m hurdles

Fana Ashby (born 15 June 1981) is a retired athlete from Trinidad and Tobago who specialised in the 100m sprint. She won the bronze medal in the 100 metres at the 2000 World Junior Championships. Ashby later won the 100m title at the 2003 CAC Championships in Athletics. She also copped 100m bronze medals at the 2005 CAC Games and the 2007 NACAC Championships.

Ashby was coached by coach Henry Rolle.

Running for the Auburn Tigers track and field team, Ashby won the 2005 60 meters at the NCAA Division I Indoor Track and Field Championships.

== Personal life ==
As a teenager Ashby attended Tranquility Government Secondary School. She was later bestowed with one of the school's sporting houses being named in her honour. Ashby later studied at Kansas City Community College where she competed in the NJCAA.

== Competition record ==
Year	Competition	Venue	Position	Event	Notes
Representing Trinidad and Tobago
1998	World Junior Championships	Annecy, France	6th	100m	11.65 (wind: +1.7 m/s)
1998	World Junior Championships	Annecy, France	24th (h)	200m	24.50 (wind: +0.5 m/s)
2000	Olympic Games	Sydney, Australia	55th (h)	100 m	11.85
2000	World Junior Championships	Santiago, Chile	3rd	100m	11.47 (wind: +2.0 m/s)
2000	World Junior Championships	Santiago, Chile	14th (h)	200m	24.46 (wind: -0.4 m/s)
2002	Commonwealth Games	Manchester, United Kingdom	10th (sf)	100 m	11.46
2002	Commonwealth Games	Manchester, United Kingdom	7th	4 × 400 m	3:39.14
2003	World Indoor Championships	Birmingham, United Kingdom	28th (sf)	60 m	7.43
2003	Central American and Caribbean Championships	St. George's, Grenada	1st	100 m	11.32
2003	Pan American Games	Santo Domingo, Dominican Republic	8th	100 m	11.52
2003	Pan American Games	Santo Domingo, Dominican Republic	12th (h)	200 m	23.97
2003	Pan American Games	Santo Domingo, Dominican Republic	4th	4 × 100 m	43.97
2004	South American U23 Championships	Barquisimeto, Venezuela	3rd	4 × 100 m relay	43.89
2004	Olympic Games	Athens, Greece	28th (qf)	100 m	11.54
2004	Olympic Games	Athens, Greece	–	4 × 100 m	DNF
2005	Central American and Caribbean Championships	Nassau, Bahamas	3rd	100 m	11.40
2005	Central American and Caribbean Championships	Nassau, Bahamas	–	4 × 100 m	DNF
2006	Commonwealth Games	Melbourne, Australia	14th (sf)	100 m	11.57
2007	NACAC Championships	San Salvador, El Salvador	3rd	4 × 100 m	43.98
2007	Pan American Games	Rio de Janeiro, Brazil	7th	4 × 100 m	44.33

== Personal bests ==
Outdoor

- 100 metres – 11.12 (Port-of-Spain 2004)
- 200 metres – 23.05 (Port-of-Spain 2003)

Indoor

- 60 metres – 7.18 (Fayetteville 2005)
- 200 metres – 22.91 (Fayetteville 2005)
