= Enikő Szabó =

Hungarian sprinter (born 1979)

Enikő Szabó (born 10 November 1979) is a Hungarian athlete specialising in the sprinting events. She won the silver in the 100 metres at the 2003 Summer Universiade.

== Competition record ==
Year	Competition	Venue	Position	Event	Notes
Representing Hungary
1997	European Junior Championships	Ljubljana, Slovenia	20th (h)	100 m	12.32
1997	European Junior Championships	Ljubljana, Slovenia	2nd	4 × 400 m relay	3:34.90
1998	World Junior Championships	Annecy, France	14th (sf)	100 m	11.88 (wind: +0.7 m/s)
1998	World Junior Championships	Annecy, France	12th (sf)	200 m	23.93 (wind: -0.7 m/s)
1998	European Championships	Budapest, Hungary	30th (h)	200 m	24.39
1998	European Championships	Budapest, Hungary	10th (h)	4 × 100 m relay	44.76
1999	European U23 Championships	Gothenburg, Sweden	7th	4 × 100 m relay	45.47
1999	European U23 Championships	Gothenburg, Sweden	9th (h)	4 × 400 m relay	3:35.08
2001	World Indoor Championships	Lisbon, Portugal	28th (h)	60 m	7.45
2001	World Indoor Championships	Lisbon, Portugal	16th (h)	200 m	24.49
2002	European Championships	Munich, Germany	24th (h)	100 m	11.62
2002	European Championships	Munich, Germany	21st (h)	200 m	23.78
2003	Universiade	Daegu, South Korea	2nd	100 m	11.61
2004	World Indoor Championships	Budapest, Hungary	20th (sf)	60 m	7.40
