= Samantha Davies (sprinter) =

British sprinter

Personal information
- Nationality: British (English)
- Born: 20 September 1979 (age 46) Liverpool, England
- Height: 157 cm (5 ft 2 in)
- Weight: 52 kg (115 lb)

Sport
- Sport: Athletics
- Event: Sprinting
- Club: Birchfield Harriers

Samantha Dawn Davies (born 20 September 1979) is a British sprinter who at the 2000 Summer Olympics.

== Biography ==
Davies finished third behind Marcia Richardson in the 100 metres event and second behind at Sarah Wilhelmy in the 200 metres event the 2000 AAA Championships, which qualified her to compete at the Olympic Games.

At the 2000 Olympic Games in Sydney, Davies represented Great Britain in the women's 200 metres event and the 4 x 100 metres relay.

Davies met baseball player Royce Clayton in 2000. They married the next year. Clayton credited Davies with teaching him to keep his legs in condition with the longevity of his baseball career; he ran 200-metre (660 ft) sprints during the offseason to maintain his speed. They have two daughters and two sons, including triplets.

Davies is a sprinting coach at Pepperdine University.

== International competitions ==
Year	Competition	Venue	Position	Event	Notes
Representing Great Britain
1998	World Junior Championships	Annecy, France	4th	4 × 100 m	44.65
2000	Olympic Games	Sydney, Australia	21st (qf)	200 m	23.20
2000	Olympic Games	Sydney, Australia	9th (sf)	4 × 100 m	43.19
(#) Indicats overall position in quarterfinals (qf) or semifinals (sf)
