= Funmilola Ogundana =

Nigerian sprinter (1980–2013)

Medal record

Women's athletics

Representing Nigeria

African Championships
Gold medal – first place	1998 Dakar	4×100 m

Funmilola "Funmi" Ogundana (26 December 1980 – 8 February 2013) was a Nigerian sprinter and hurdler. She died in childbirth in Abuja, Nigeria.

== Achievements ==
Year	Competition	Venue	Position	Event	Notes
Representing Nigeria
1997	West African Championships	Cotonou, Benin	3rd	400m hurdles	
1997	West African Championships	Cotonou, Benin	2nd	100m hurdles	
1997	African U20 Athletics Championships	Ibadan, Nigeria	1st	100m	
1997	African U20 Athletics Championships	Ibadan, Nigeria	1st	200m	
1997	African U20 Athletics Championships	Ibadan, Nigeria	2nd	100m hurdles	
1998	World Junior Championships	Annecy, France	7th	100m	11.68 (wind: +1.7 m/s)
1998	World Junior Championships	Annecy, France	8th	200m	23.99 (wind: -1.1 m/s)
1998	African Championships	Dakar, Senegal	1st	4 × 100 m relay	
2001	West African Championships	Lagos, Nigeria]	2nd	100m hurdles	
2006	Commonwealth Games	Melbourne, Australia	4th	4 × 100 m relay	44.37

=== Personal bests ===
- 100 metres - 11.58 s (2005)
- 200 metres - 23.56 s (1998)
- 100 metres hurdles - 14.17 s (2007)
