= Maryna Maydanova =

Ukrainian sprinter

Medal record
Women's athletics
Representing Ukraine
World Youth Championships
Bronze medal – third place	1999 Bydgoszcz	4x400 m relay
European U23 Championships
Gold medal – first place	2003 Bydgoszcz	200 m
Gold medal – first place	2003 Bydgoszcz	4x100 m relay

Maryna Maydanova (Ukrainian: Марина Майданова, born 22 February 1982) is a Ukrainian sprinter who specializes in the 200 metres.

She won the gold medal at the 2003 European U23 Championships, finished fourth at the 2004 World Indoor Championships and eighth at the 2004 World Athletics Final. She competed at the 1999 World Youth Championships, the 2003 World Indoor Championships, the 2003 World Championships, the 2004 Olympic Games and the 2005 World Championships without reaching the final.

Maydanova won a bronze medal in the medley relay at the 1999 World Youth Championships. In the 4 x 100 metres relay she competed at the 2004 Olympic Games without reaching the final.

Her personal best times are 7.48 seconds in the 60 metres (indoor), achieved in March 2001 in Gomel; 11.37 seconds in the 100 metres, achieved in June 2004 in Kyiv and 22.70 seconds in the 200 metres, achieved in June 2003 in Velenje. She co-holds the Ukrainian record in the 4 x 100 metres relay.
