= Olena Pastushenko-Sinyavina =

Ukrainian sprinter

Olena Pastushenko-Sinyavina (Ukrainian: Олена Пастушенко-Синявіна, born 14 July 1979) is a retired Ukrainian sprinter who specialized in the 100 metres and 200 metres.

She won the silver medal in the 100 metres at the 1999 European U23 Championships. She competed in the 200 metres at the 2000 Olympic Games and the 2003 World Indoor Championships without reaching the final, and in the 100 metres at the 2002 European Championships and the 2003 World Championships without reaching the final.

In the 4 x 100 metres relay she finished fifth at the 2002 European Championships, and fourth at the 2003 World Championships. She also competed at the 2000 Olympic Games and the 2005 World Championships without reaching the final.

Her personal best times are 7.23 seconds in the 60 metres (indoor), achieved in January 2000 in Kyiv; and 11.24 seconds in the 100 metres, achieved in July 1999 in Gothenburg; and 22.85 seconds in the 200 metres, achieved in July 2000 in Dortmund. She co-holds the Ukrainian record in the 4 x 100 metres relay.
