= Sarah Reilly =

Irish sprinter

Sarah Reilly née Oxley
Personal information
- Nationality: Irish
- Born: 3 July 1973 (age 52) Leeds, England
- Height: 165 cm (5 ft 5 in)
- Weight: 56 kg (123 lb)
- Spouse: Brendan Reilly (m. 2000)

Sport
- Sport: Athletics
- Event: Sprinting
- Club: Birchfield Harriers

Sarah Elizabeth Reilly née Oxley (born 3 July 1973) is an English-born Irish sprinter who competed at the 2000 Summer Olympics.

== Biography ==
Oxley married Irish high jumper Brendan Reilly and adopted Irish nationality on 7 June 2000.

As Sarah Reilly she won the British AAA Championships title in the 200 metres event at the 2001 AAA Championships. Shortly afterwards she represented Ireland in the women's 100 metres at the 2000 Olympic Games in Sydney.

== See also ==
- List of eligibility transfers in athletics
