= Tamicka Clarke =

Bahamian sprinter

Personal information
- Born: 9 November 1980 (age 45)

Sport
- Sport: Track and field
- Club: Auburn Tigers
Medal record
Athletics
Representing Bahamas
Commonwealth Games
Gold medal – first place	2002 Manchester	4x100 m relay
Central American and Caribbean Games
Bronze medal – third place	2006 Cartagena	4x100 m relay
CAC Championships
Gold medal – first place	2003 St. George's	4x100 m relay
Silver medal – second place	2003 St. George's	100 m
Bronze medal – third place	2008 Cali	4x100 m relay
CAC Junior Championships (U20)
Silver medal – second place	1998 George Town	4x100 m relay

Tamicka Clarke (born 9 November 1980) is a Bahamian sprinter who specializes in the 100 metres. Her personal best time is 11.26 seconds, achieved in June 2007 in Atlanta, Georgia.

She finished fourth in 4 x 100 metres relay at the 2004 Summer Olympics, with teammates Chandra Sturrup, Shandria Brown and Debbie Ferguson.

Clarke represented the Bahamas at the 2008 Summer Olympics in Beijing competing at the 100 metres sprint. In her first round heat she placed sixth in a time of 12.16 which was not enough to advance to the second round.

Clarke was coached by coach Henry Rolle.
