= Yuliya Tabakova =

Russian sprinter

Medal record

Women's athletics

Representing Russia

Olympic Games
Silver medal – second place	2004 Athens	4×100 m relay

World Championships
Bronze medal – third place	2003 Paris	4x100 m relay

Yuliya Gennadiyevna Tabakova (Russian: Юлия Геннадьевна Табакова; born 1 May 1980, in Kaluga) is a Russian track and field sprint athlete, competing internationally for Russia.

She won the silver medal in the 4 × 100 m relay at the 2004 Olympic Games in Athens, Greece.
