= Muriel Hurtis-Houairi =

French sprinter (born 1979)

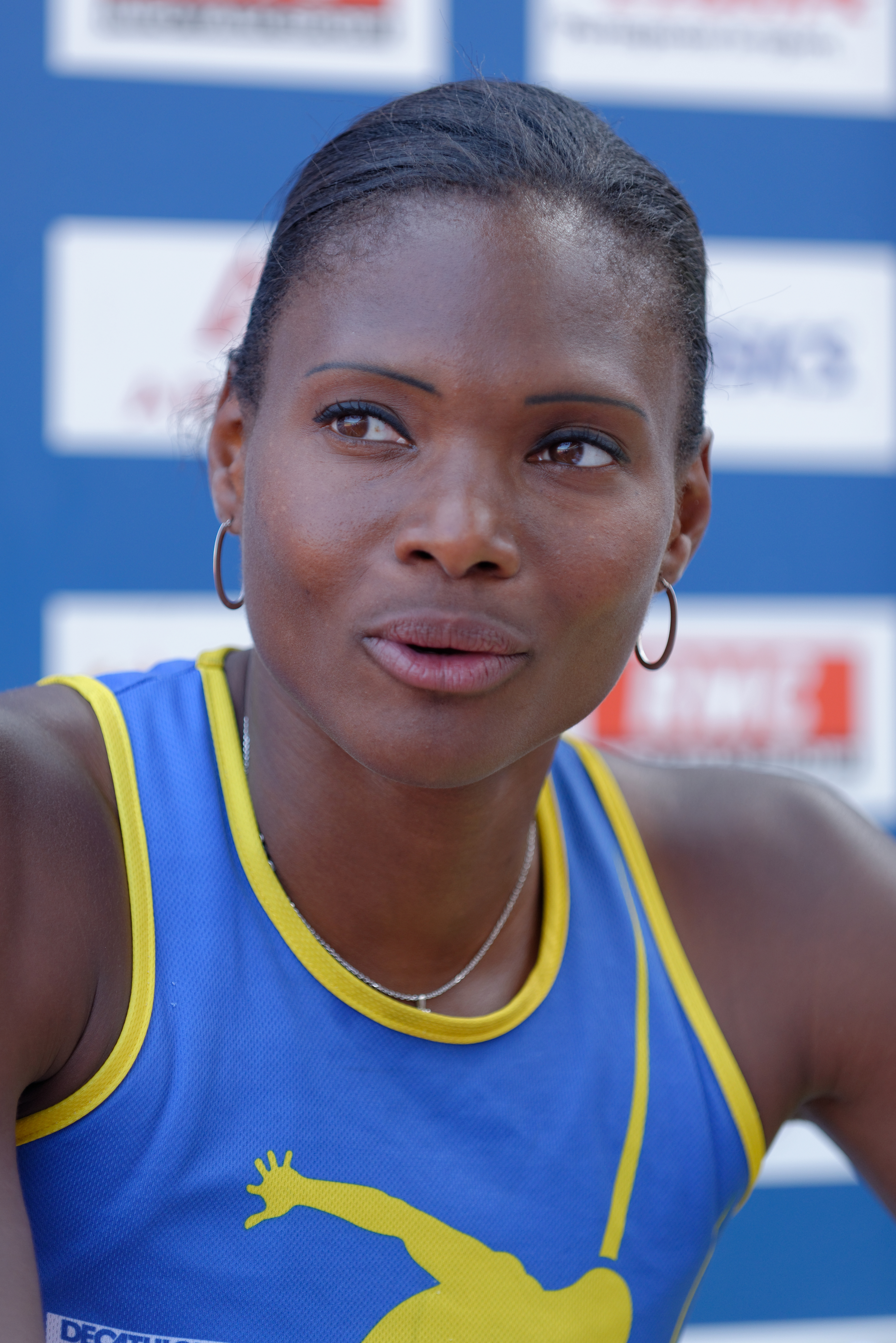
- Hurtis at the 2013 French Athletics Championships

Personal information
- Born: 25 March 1979 (age 47) Bondy, France
- Height: 1.8 m (5 ft 11 in)
- Weight: 65 kg (143 lb)

Sport
- Country: France
- Sport: Athletics
- Event: 4 × 400 m Relay
Medal record
Olympic Games
Bronze medal – third place	2004 Athens	4 × 100 m relay
World Championships
Silver medal – second place	1999 Seville	4 × 100 m relay
Silver medal – second place	2001 Edmonton	4 × 100 m relay
Gold medal – first place	2003 Paris	4 × 100 m relay
Bronze medal – third place	2003 Paris	200 m
Bronze medal – third place	2013 Moscow	4 × 400 m relay
European Championships
Gold medal – first place	2002 Munich	200 m
Gold medal – first place	2002 Munich	4 × 100 m relay
Gold medal – first place	2014 Zürich	4 × 400 m
Continental Cup
Silver medal – second place	2002 Madrid	200 m
Bronze medal – third place	2002 Madrid	4 × 100 m relay
World Indoor Championships
Gold medal – first place	2003 Birmingham	200 m
European Indoor Championships
Gold medal – first place	2000 Ghent	200 m
Gold medal – first place	2002 Vienna	200 m
Bronze medal – third place	2011 Paris	4 × 400 m relay
European U23 Championships
Gold medal – first place	1999 Gothenburg	4 × 400 m relay
Silver medal – second place	1999 Gothenburg	200 m
World Junior Championships
Gold medal – first place	1998 Annecy	200 m
Silver medal – second place	1998 Annecy	4 × 100 m relay
European Junior Championships
Gold medal – first place	1997 Ljubljana	4 × 400 m relay
Silver medal – second place	1997 Ljubljana	200 m

Muriel Hurtis-Houairi, née Muriel Hurtis, (25 March 1979) is a French track and field athlete. She came to prominence in 2002 when she won the 200 m gold medals at both the European Indoor Championships and the European Athletics Championships. The following year she added the World Indoor title and won a bronze medal at the 2003 World Championships in Athletics and a gold in the 4 × 100 metres relay with France.

Her form faltered over the next few years and she failed to get past the quarter-final stage at the 2004 Olympic Games, although she won Olympic bronze in the relay. She failed to retain her European title at the 2006 European Athletics Championships and was knocked out at the quarter-finals of the 2007 World Championships. She missed out on the 200 m final at the 2008 Summer Olympics by one place. She is the French indoor record holder over 200 m.

== Career ==
Her first major success came at the 1998 IAAF World Junior Championships in Annecy, France, where she won the 200 m gold medal. She made her first senior global appearance at age 20 at the 1999 World Championships in Athletics and, after running a personal best of 22.31 seconds in the qualifiers, she finished fifth in the 200 m semi-finals. She ran with the women's 4 × 100 metres relay team and scored a silver medal alongside Sylviane Félix, Frédérique Bangué, and Odiah Sidibé. Hurtis made her Olympic debut the following year at the 2000 Summer Olympics and again she reached the semi-finals, this time finishing in seventh place. Hurtis's first global final came at the 2001 IAAF World Indoor Championships, where she finished in fifth. She also helped the French relay team to the World silver medal at the 2001 World Championships in Athletics later that year.

=== European and World medals ===
The 2002 season marked a significant career progression for Hurtis, beginning with the gold medal at the European Indoor Championships. She ran a 100 metres personal best that summer, recording a time of 10.96 seconds, making her the joint second-fastest French woman over the distance alongside Marie-José Pérec. She became the 200 m European Champion at the 2002 European Athletics Championships, winning in a season's best time of 22.43 seconds, and won a second gold with France as part of the 4 × 100 metres relay team. She closed the year with a fourth place in the 100 m at the 2002 IAAF Grand Prix Final and by winning the 200 m silver medal at the 2002 IAAF World Cup behind Debbie Ferguson.

She continued her strong form into 2003, recording a French indoor record of 22.49 seconds in the 200 m at the 2003 IAAF World Indoor Championships before going on to win the gold medal. At the 2003 World Championships in Athletics she finished in fourth place, but the original winner (Kelli White) was stripped of her medal for using banned substances and Hurtis was upgraded to the bronze medal. Further complicating the situation, Anastasiya Kapachinskaya, who was upgraded to the gold medal was banned six months later for steroid use. Hurtis went on to win her second medal of the competition by winning the relay with Sylviane Félix, Christine Arron and Patricia Girard. At the inaugural 2003 IAAF World Athletics Final, she won the 200 m gold and took fifth in the 100 m.

=== Drop in form ===
With the removal of the 200 m from the World Indoor programme, Hurtis took part in her first global 60 metres race at the 2004 IAAF World Indoor Championships as was fifth with a season's best of 7.17 seconds. In the 2004 Olympics she failed to qualify for the semi-finals of the 200 metres. She won the bronze medal in the 4 × 100 m relay at the 2004 Olympic Games in Athens, Greece.

Hurtis-Houairi represented France at the 2008 Summer Olympics in Beijing. She competed at the 4 × 100 metres relay together with Myriam Soumaré, Lina Jacques-Sebastien and Carima Louami. In their first round heat they did not finish and were eliminated due to a mistake with the baton exchange.

A number of injuries to her hamstring interrupted her career in 2009 and 2010, but she returned to the track in May 2010 and ran the 400 metres in 53.65 seconds. Encouraged by her quick performance, given that she had not attempted distance competitively since 1998, she did not rule out a switch to the longer distance. However, she said her main focus remained the 200 m.

== Personal bests ==
Event	Time (sec)	Venue	Date
50 metres	6.14	Liévin, France	23 February 2003
60 metres	7.09	Liévin, France	23 February 2003
100 metres	10.96	Annecy, France	22 June 2002
150 metres	17.35	Nantes, France	22 September 1999
200 metres	22.31	Seville, Spain	24 August 1999
400 metres	51.41	Antony, Hauts-de-Seine, France	22 May 2010
100 metres (indoor)	11.28	Tampere, Finland	4 February 2002
200 metres (indoor)	22.49 NR	Birmingham, United Kingdom	14 March 2003

- All information taken from IAAF profile.
