= Douglas Wilkie Medal =

The Douglas Wilkie Medal was an award presented to those who did the least for Australian rules football in the best and fairest manner. An accolade presented by the Anti-Football League, it was named after Douglas Wilkie, a Sun News-Pictorial columnist active between 1946 and 1986. It was Douglas Wilkie who first suggested the notion of an Anti-Football League, which was brought into being by Keith Dunstan. The League existed as a response to the overwhelming obsession of football by the Melbourne public.

The award was the League's answer to the Australian Football League's Brownlow Medal, an honour bestowed on footballers who throughout the season play in a skilled and sportsmanlike fashion.

Following the suggestion of Wilkie's fellow writer Cyril Pearl, who wished to burn a football to express his disaffection for the game, the winner must destroy a football in a unique and creative manner on receiving their medal.

== Previous winners ==
- 1967 – Harold Holt, Prime Minister of Australia
- 1968 – Bob Skilton, football player
- 1969 – Ron Frazer, actor
- 1970 – Barry Oakley, author A Salute to the Great McCarthy: a Novel (1970) ISBN 0-85561-008-5; the book was filmed in 1975 under the same name.
- 1972 – Cyril Pearl, author
- 1973 – Doug McClelland, politician
- 1974 – Leon Hill, former General Manager of GTV-9
- 1975 – Barry Humphries, writer, actor and satirist
- 1977 – Kate Baillieu, former GTV-9 personality
- 1979 – Pete Smith, television announcer
- 1980 – Jack Elliot, racing writer
- 1981 – Lindsay Thompson, Premier of Victoria
- 1983 – Julie Clarke, a suffering housewife
- 1985 – Shelley Dye, another suffering housewife
- 1986 – Sir Les Patterson, alter-ego of Barry Humphries
- 1987 – Peter Russell-Clarke, celebrity chef
- 1988 – Terry Lane, radio broadcaster
- 1989 – Raelene Boyle, athlete
- 1990 – Tim Bowden, ABC broadcaster and author
- 1991 - John Colwill, ABC broadcaster and plantsman
- 1992 – Wendy Harmer, broadcaster and comedian
- 1993 – Tim Bowden, broadcaster
- 1994 – Dennis Pryor, author and broadcaster
- 2007 – Barry Jones, former quiz champion, politician and author
- 2008 – Michael Leunig, cartoonist
- 2010 – Catherine Deveny, columnist
- 2011 – Brian Troy, a 74-year-old Melburnian who has never attended an Australian rules football match.
