= Keith Dunstan =

Australian writer (1925–2013)

Keith Dunstan OAM
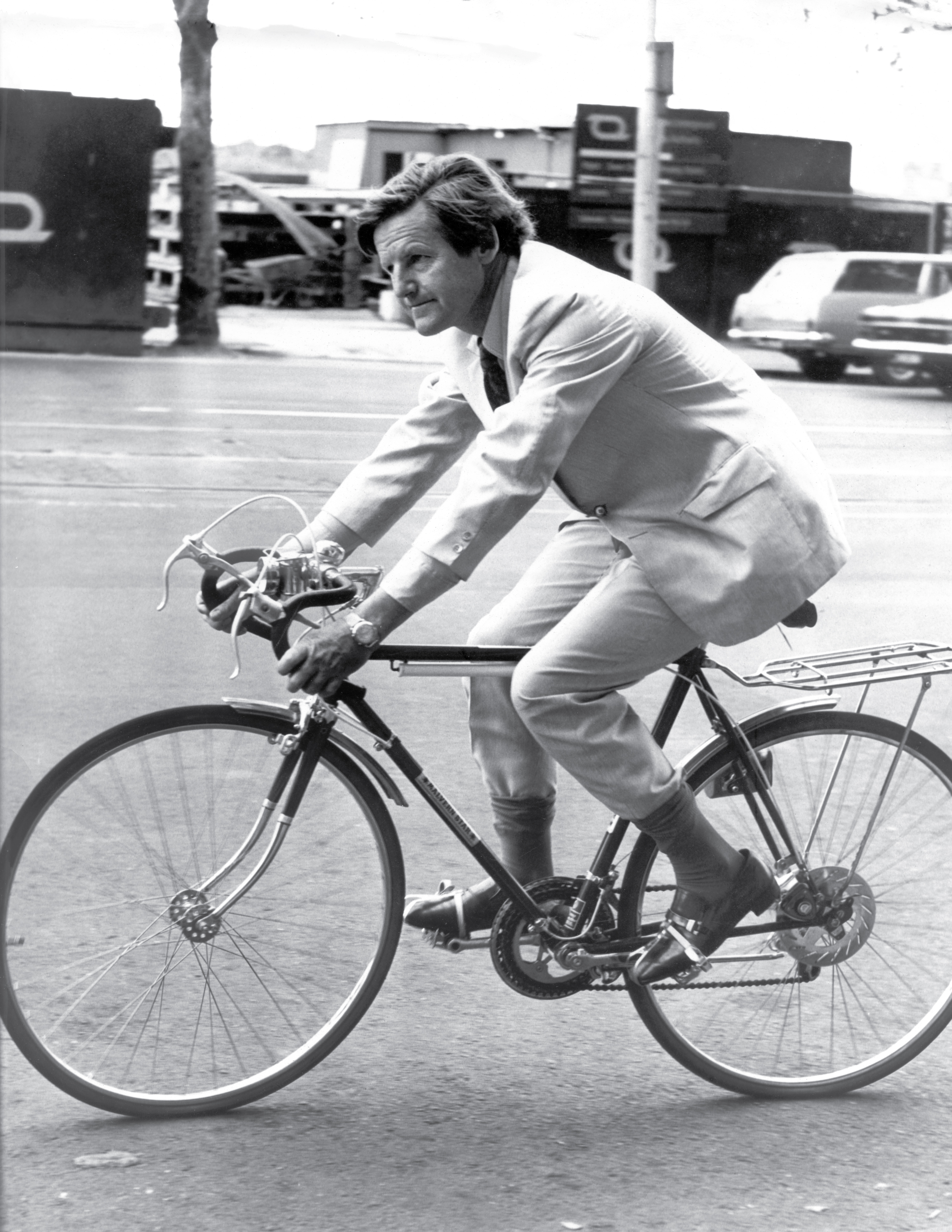
- Dunstan on his bicycle in the 1970s
- Born: 3 February 1925; Malvern East, Victoria, Australia
- Died: 11 September 2013 (aged 88); Melbourne, Victoria
- Occupations: Journalist and author
- Parent: William Dunstan
- Website: keithdunstan.org

John Keith Dunstan OAM (3 February 1925 – 11 September 2013), known as Keith Dunstan, was an Australian journalist and author. He was a prolific writer and the author of more than 35 books.

== Early life ==
Dunstan was born in East Malvern, Victoria, the son of journalist and a Victoria Cross recipient, William Dunstan, and his wife Marjorie. He attended Melbourne Grammar School and Geelong Grammar School and was a flight lieutenant in the Royal Australian Air Force from 1943 to 1946, stationed at Labuan in the Pacific.

== Journalism ==
In 1946, Dunstan joined The Herald and Weekly Times Ltd, publishers of The Sun News-Pictorial and The Herald (since merged as the Herald Sun). He was Foreign Correspondent for the H&WT with posts in New York (1949–1952) and London (1952–1954). This period was followed by a position with The Courier-Mail, for which he wrote a column "Day by Day". He returned to Melbourne and, from 1958 to 1978, contributed a daily column, "A Place in the Sun" for The Sun News-Pictorial, the city's largest circulating daily newspaper. During these years his popularity grew, and he became a Melbourne institution.

From 1962, he wrote regularly for the Sydney-based weekly magazine The Bulletin under the pseudonym of Batman (after the founder of Melbourne, John Batman) and for the travel magazine Walkabout. In 1976 and 1977, he was president of the Melbourne Press Club, succeeding Rohan Rivett. He was the United States West Coast Correspondent (1979–1982) for The Herald and Weekly Times. Later, he was a regular columnist and occasional contributor to The Age newspaper.

== Author ==
He published a quartet of books on Australian character: Wowsers (1968), Knockers (1972), Sports (1973), and Ratbags (1979), and many works of history on popular subjects ranging from wine, to sport, to retailing, and including an unfashionably critical study of the Australian outlaw Ned Kelly, Saint Ned (1980). His pioneering works of Australian sports history included The Paddock That Grew (1962) on the Melbourne Cricket Ground, which has now seen several editions and updates. He also wrote an autobiography, No Brains at All (1990). Other publications included The Melbourne I Remember (2004) and Moonee Ponds to Broadway (2006), a study of one of his friends and a fellow Melburnian, the satirist Barry Humphries.

== Other activities ==
In 1967, he became founding secretary of the Anti-Football League, a tongue-in-cheek organisation that pokes fun at the Australian rules football obsession.

An enthusiastic commuter and recreational cyclist, he was the first president of the Bicycle Institute of Victoria (now known as Bicycle Network) from its founding in 1974 to 1978. He was a bicycle touring enthusiast who with his wife Marie cycled across the United States in the 1970s and through China in the 1980s.

Whilst living on Victoria's Mornington Peninsula he was an enthusiastic grower and maker of pinot noir wine.

== Honours and awards ==
In the 2002 Australia Day Honours, Dunstan was awarded a Medal of the Order of Australia (OAM) "for service as a journalist and author, and to the community, particularly as a supporter of the Berry Street Babies Home".

On 26 May 2009, he became Patron of the Prahran Mechanics' Institute.

On 11 October 2013, Dunstan was posthumously inducted into the Melbourne Press Club's Victorian Media Hall of Fame. He was told of his forthcoming induction before his death.

== Personal life ==
Dunstan and his wife Marie (daughter of Charles McFadyen) had four children. Dunstan died of cancer on 11 September 2013. Dunstan's son, David, reported that his father had written his own, self-effacing, obituary.

== Books ==
Year	Title	Publisher	ISBN	Notes
1962	The paddock that grew: the story of the Melbourne Cricket Club	Cassell		Research by Hugh Field
1966	Supporting a column	Cassell		
1968	Wowsers; being an account of the prudery exhibited by certain outstanding men and women in such matters as drinking, smoking, prostitution, censorship and gambling	Cassell		
1971	The Australian uppercrust book	Sun Books	0-7251-0132-6	Edited by Geoffrey Dutton and Lee White
1972	Knockers	Cassell	0-304-93921-8	
1973	Sports	Cassell	0-304-29957-X	
1979	It's all up hill	Pegasus Books	0-908131-19-4	Joint author Jeff Hook
1979	Moomba, the first 25 years	Sun News-Pictorial and Melbourne Moomba Festival	0-9595453-0-1	
1979	Ratbags	Golden Press	0-85558-784-9	Foreword by Barry Humphries
1979	The store on the hill	Macmillan		
1979	Make friends for Australia and for Victoria	Australian Tourist Commission		Booklet
1980	Saint Ned: the story of the near sanctification of an Australian outlaw	Methuen Australia	0-454-00198-3	
1983	A cricket dictionary	Sun Books	0-7251-0432-5	Illustrated by Jeff Hook
1983	Footy, an Aussie rules dictionary	Sun Books	0-7251-0404-X	Illustrated by Jeff Hook
1984	Tennis: a tennis dictionary	Sun Books	0-7251-0450-3	Illustrated by Jeff Hook
1985	Above Australia: a salute to our cities	Weldons	0-949708-20-8	Author of text, photography by Leo Meier
1985	Health and fitness: the dictionary	Sun Books	0-7251-0488-0	Illustrated by Jeff Hook
1985	Racing: the horse-racing dictionary	Sun Books	0-7251-0463-5	Illustrated by Jeff Hook
1985	Wine, the wine dictionary	Sun Books	0-7251-0482-1	Illustrated by Jeff Hook
1986	Bowls – the lawn bowls dictionary	Sun Books	0-7251-0522-4	Illustrated by Jeff Hook
1986	Gurney & Bluey & Curley: Alex Gurney and his greatest cartoons	Macmillan Company of Australia	0-7251-0504-6	John Gurney with Keith Dunstan
1986	Hook, line and sinker: the dictionary	Sun Books	0-7251-0510-0	Illustrated by Jeff Hook
1987	Skiing, the skiing dictionary	Sun Books	0-7251-0539-9	
1987	The amber nectar: a celebration of beer and brewing in Australia	Viking O'Neil	0-670-90044-3	
1988	Bundy: a centenary history	Bundaberg Distilling Company		
1989	A day in the life of Australia: the complete collection of his Age column	Macmillan Co. of Australia	0-7329-0185-5	Compiler
1989	The perfect cup: the story of coffee	David Ell Press for Andronicus	0-7316-6588-0	With Sue Fairlie-Cuninghame
1990	No brains at all: an autobiography	Viking	0-670-83273-1	
1991	Flag, the first 30 years: the growth and experiences of the hospitality industry in Australasia	Flag International	0-646-05377-9	
1991	No brains on Tuesday: the collected wit & wisdom of Keith Dunstan	Schwarts & Wilkinson	1-86337-067-6	
1994	My life with the demon	Wilkinson Books	1-86350-186-X	
1995	Just Jeans: the story 1970-1995	Australian Scholarly Publishing	1-875606-31-9	
1999	Not a bad drop: Brown Brothers	Australian Scholarly Publishing	1-875606-66-1	
1999	The confessions of a bicycle nut	Information Australia	1-86350-252-1	
2000	The people's ground: the MCG	Australian Scholarly Publishing	1-875606-78-5	
2001	Informed sources: a history of the Melbourne Press Club 1971-2001	Melbourne Press Club	0-9579503-0-6	
2003	1853-2003, Victoria Police Australia: celebrating 150 years in the community	Victoria Police	0-9581712-0-3	Writer of introduction
2003	The tapestry story: celebrating 150 years of the Melbourne cricket ground	Lothian Books	0-7344-0605-3	Biographies by Ken Williams and David Allen, with illustrations by Robert Ingpen
2004	Batman in the Bulletin: the Melbourne I remember	Australian Scholarly Publishing	1-74097-062-4	Foreword by Barry Humphries, selected and edited by David Dunstan
2005	Collins: the story of Australia's premier street	Australian Scholarly Publishing	1-74097-057-8	By Judith Raphael Buckrich with Keith Dunstan, Rohan Storey & Marc Strizic
2006	Moonee Ponds to Broadway	Australian Postal Corporation	0-642-36824-4	
2011	Two old geezers tell you about bridge, the A-Z	Wilkinson Publishing	978-1-921804-30-4	With Jeff Hook
2017	Kiwi: the Australian brand that brought a shine to the world: a history of the Kiwi Polish Company	Allen & Unwin	978-1-76029-728-2	Foreword by Geoffrey Blainey Published posthumously
