= Douglas Wilkie =

Australian journalist (1909–2002)

Douglass Wilkie
- Born: 1909
- Died: 10 April 2002 (aged 92–93)
- Occupation: Newspaper journalist
- Parents: Allan Wilkie (father); Frediswyde Hunter-Watts (mother)

Douglas Wilkie (1909 – 10 April 2002) was an Australian journalist, a respected columnist for The Sun News-Pictorial.

== History ==
The son of travelling Shakespearean actors Allan Wilkie and Frediswyde Hunter-Watts, he began his newspaper career as a copy boy with the Hobart Mercury. This period was followed by Keith Murdoch appointing him as Geelong correspondent for The Herald.

By 1935 he was a foreign correspondent for The Herald in China, reporting on the Japanese "consolidation" of Manchukuo as the White Russians departed west. In 1942 he was in Singapore, reporting for the Adelaide Advertiser on the Japanese invasion, followed by Rangoon, Delhi, and London, from where he reported on the Blitz and the Invasion of Europe. He was in Berlin to report on the Occupation and the post-war shortages. Around this time he was condemned in the Catholic press for criticising General MacArthur, for favoring peace with Russia and recognition of China, and preferring Moslem values to Christian.

Wilkie is best remembered for his regular political commentary for The Sun News-Pictorial which he wrote during 1946–1986. His columns were syndicated across Australia, in Adelaide as "As I See It".

He was notoriously critical of Melbourne's obsession with Australian rules football. The Douglas Wilkie Medal, a mock award of the Anti-Football League, was named in his honour.

== Sources ==
- Obituary, Herald Sun, 11 April 2002.
- Obituary, The Age, 18 April 2002.
