= Terry Lane =

Australian journalist

- Born: 1939 (age 86–87); Williamstown, South Australia
- Occupations: Minister, broadcaster, columnist
- Known for: Radio National broadcaster
- Awards: Douglas Wilkie Medal (1988); Rostrum Award of Merit (1979)

Terry Lane (born 1939) is a retired Australian radio broadcaster and newspaper columnist based in Melbourne.

Lane was born at Williamstown in South Australia and was educated at Gawler High School. After studying for the ministry at the Churches of Christ College of the Bible in Melbourne, Lane was a minister for six years before working for the Methodist Department of Christian Education and the ABC's religious department. He began a radio talk-back program for the ABC in Melbourne in 1977, which ran for eleven months.

The Monash Biographical Dictionary of 20th Century Australia describes Lane as "a capable and empathetic interviewer, though often expounding controversial views". Geraldine Doogue has called him "an interviewer's interviewer; he's self-effacing, but probing, and these days [2005], certainly not afraid of expressing his own opinions. He's gloriously unpredictable, offends listeners of both liberal and conservative inclinations, and delights just as many others."

Lane is probably best known for his daily radio program, which ran from 1982 to 1993 on 3LO, 2BL, 7ZR and 2NC. In 1995, he returned to the ABC's Radio National to present a weekly program, The National Interest, from which he retired in 2005 after 10 years of hosting the program.

He published a collection of his interviews with famous Australians about their childhood experiences in As the Twig is Bent (1979) and is also the author of More than Meets the Ear (1987), Hobbyhorses (1990) and God: The Interview (1993, second edition 2004). In 1993 he published his first novel, Hectic, which was followed by Tit for Tat (1994) and Sparrows Fall (1995). The First Century, a history of Australia's federal elections co-authored with fellow broadcaster Doug Aiton, was published in June 2000.

In 1979, Lane was awarded the Rostrum Award of Merit, for excellence in the art of public speaking over a considerable period and his demonstration of an effective contribution to society through the spoken word.

From 2003 he reviewed digital photography hardware and software for The Age and The Sydney Morning Herald, a position from which he retired in December 2016.

Lane was secretary of the anti-censorship organisation Free Speech Victoria. He also is the winner of the Douglas Wilkie Medal, awarded by the Anti-Football League for doing the least for Australian rules football in the best and fairest manner.
