= Kate Baillieu =

Australian journalist (born 1946)

- Born: Katherine Jean Baillieu; 17 January 1946 (age 80); Australia
- Occupations: Former Journalist, assistant to Kerry Packer

Katharine Jean Baillieu (born 17 January 1946) is an Australian former journalist.

== Early career ==
Baillieu worked as a journalist and later as a personal assistant to Kerry Packer. In 1977, Baillieu was awarded the Douglas Wilkie Medal by the Anti-Football League. In an interview with The Australian in February 2009, Baillieu revealed that she almost became a reporter for 60 Minutes and said that after she resigned, her role as an investigative journalist into asbestos was "ever so delicately erased... they airbrushed me out".

== Public controversies ==
Baillieu has been involved in public controversies against development in and around Portsea. She has been described in the press as the "general for the old money push" in "a struggle of old and new money" about development in the area. However, Baillieu has stated: "This is a neighbourly, peaceful place. Portsea conjures up an image. But we are not exclusive. Anyone can come here."

=== Lindsay Fox ===
Baillieu was described as a "dogged nemesis" of Lindsay Fox who is her Portsea neighbour. However, Baillieu failed in a court bid to prevent him landing his helicopter at his Portsea house. During court proceedings Baillieu was forced to admit under cross examination that she had landed helicopters in Portsea when she was Kerry Packer's personal assistant.

She is currently embroiled in a new battle with Fox over his claims on the Portsea beach in front of his holiday house.

=== Point Nepean ===
In late 2002 and in 2003, the Federal Government considered selling or leasing part of Point Nepean. Baillieu became an activist against the proposed redevelopment saying "We could end up with is one rich bloke building a couple of houses there. It will be a bloody tragedy, I can tell you." and "If this priceless heritage land falls into private hands there will undoubtedly be a local electoral backlash and I think it will be a matter of national shame, deep shame". The sale of parts of Point Nepean was prevented by a very strong community campaign which eventually led to Point Nepean being declared a National Park and Heritage listed.

=== Sorrento Post Office ===
In May 2012, Baillieu opposed the plans to close or relocate the Sorrento Post Office. Despite Baillieu's intervention to stop the relocation, it has been reported that the Sorrento Post Office, built in 1905, is now expected to be sold.

== Political ambitions ==
The Age reported in 2003 that Baillieu was considering entering politics as an independent. As yet, however, she has not made a run for public office.

== Personal life ==
Baillieu is the fourth of seven children of Darren and Diana Baillieu (née Knox). She is a sister of Ted Baillieu, the former Premier of the State of Victoria. Baillieu is a resident of both Toorak, Melbourne (Hawksburn) and Portsea, Victoria.

Baillieu married Victorian politician and businessman Julian Doyle in October 1983. The marriage to Baillieu was Doyle's second marriage. They had one child together, a daughter, Amy, born in 1986.
