= William Dunstan =

Australian soldier

William Dunstan VC
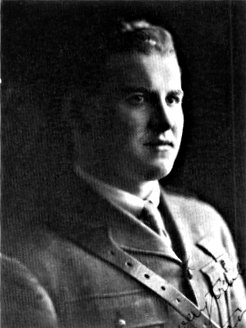
- William Dunstan in c. 1916
- Born: 8 March 1895; Ballarat, Victoria
- Died: 2 March 1957 (aged 61); Toorak, Victoria
- Relatives: Keith Dunstan (son)
- Military career
- Allegiance: Australia
- Branch: Citizens Military Force; Australian Imperial Force
- Service years: 1914–1928
- Rank: Lieutenant
- Units: 7th Battalion
- Conflicts: First World War; Gallipoli Campaign; Battle of Lone Pine
- Awards: Victoria Cross; Mentioned in Despatches

William Dunstan, VC (2 March 1895 – 8 March 1957) was an Australian recipient of the Victoria Cross, the highest award for gallantry "in the face of the enemy" that can be awarded to members of the British and Commonwealth armed forces.

== Biography ==
Dunstan was born on 8 March 1895. He was 20 years old and a corporal in the 7th Battalion, Australian Imperial Force during the First World War when he was awarded the VC for his actions on 9 August 1915, during the Battle of Lone Pine on Gallipoli, Turkey. During the action Turkish forces had made a determined counter-attack on the centre of the newly captured trench held by a lieutenant, Frederick Harold Tubb, two corporals (Alexander Stewart Burton and Corporal Dunstan), and a few men. The Turkish blew in the sand-bag barricade, leaving only a foot standing, but Tubb, Burton and Dunstan repelled them and rebuilt the barricade. Twice more the Turkish blew in the barricade and on each occasion they were repelled and the barricade rebuilt.

Dunstan was blind for almost a year after Lone Pine. He later achieved the rank of lieutenant. Before the war, Dunstan had been a messenger boy in a draper's shop. After the war he worked for the Repatriation Department in Melbourne and in 1921 joined the staff of The Herald and Weekly Times as an accountant. He rose to become its general manager. He died on 2 March 1957.

His Victoria Cross is displayed at the Australian War Memorial, Canberra. In 1995 a Memorial to Dunstan was erected in Sturt St, Ballarat, Victoria, Australia. The "Dunstan VC Club" at Puckapunyal is named in his honour. He was survived by his wife, Marjorie, and three children, William "Bill" Dunstan, Helen McIntosh and the prominent journalist and writer Keith Dunstan.

== Medals ==
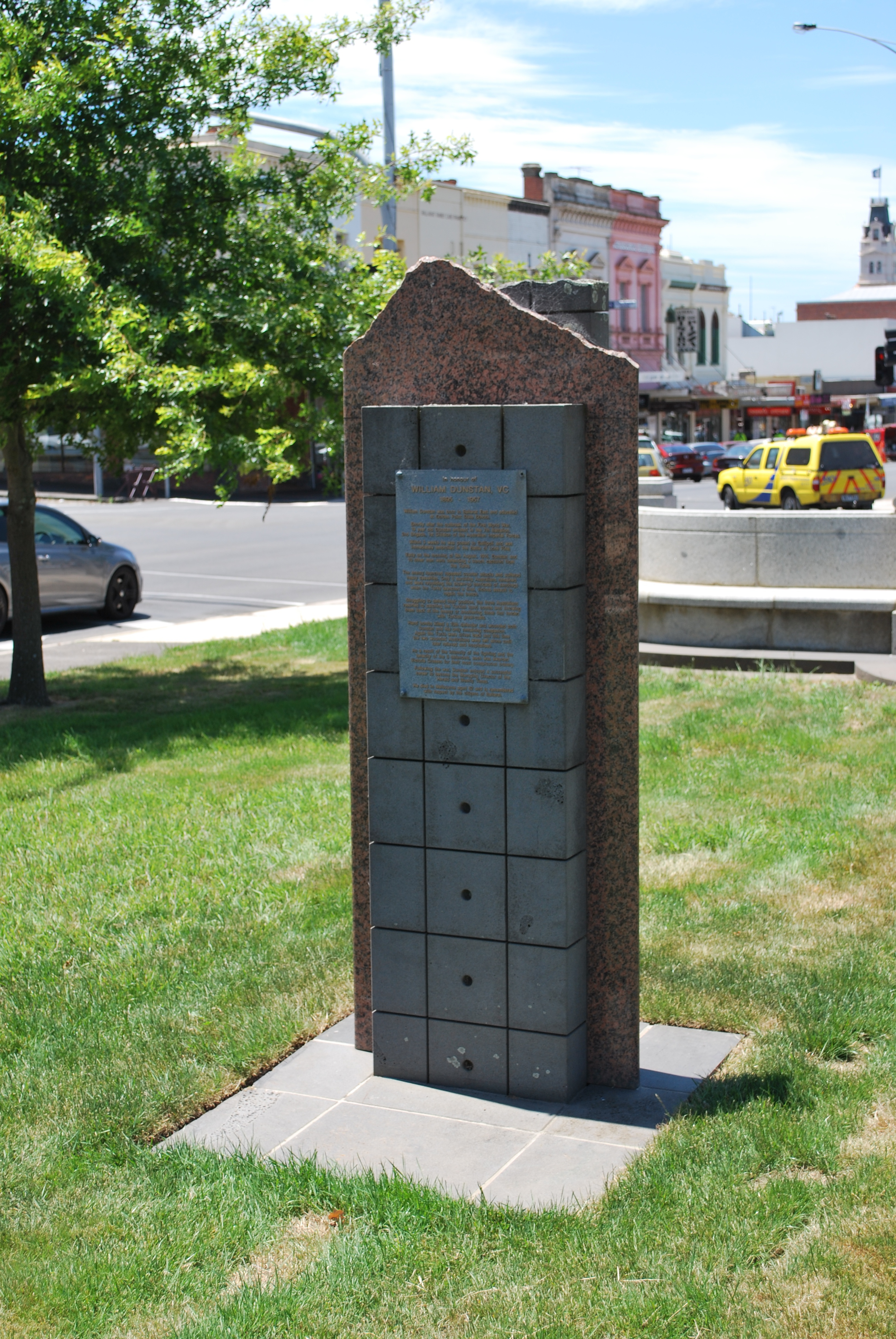
Memorial to Dunstan in Ballarat

Dunstan was awarded:

- Victoria Cross
- 1914–15 Star
- British War Medal
- Victory Medal with oakleaf (MID)
- George VI Coronation Medal
- Elizabeth II Coronation Medal

== Bibliography ==
- Snelling, Stephen (2012) [1995]. Gallipoli. VCs of the First World War. The History Press. ISBN 978-0752456539.
