= The National Interest (Radio National) =

Former Australian radio program

The National Interest was an Australian weekly radio program on the Australian Broadcasting Corporation's Radio National network, covering national issues of interest in depth, with a focus on Australian politics. It ran from 1995 until 16 December 2011.

Terry Lane presented the program from 1995, and retired in 2005, when Peter Mares took over as presenter.
