= Lijssenthoek Military Cemetery =

CWGC cemetery in Belgium

- Commonwealth War Graves Commission
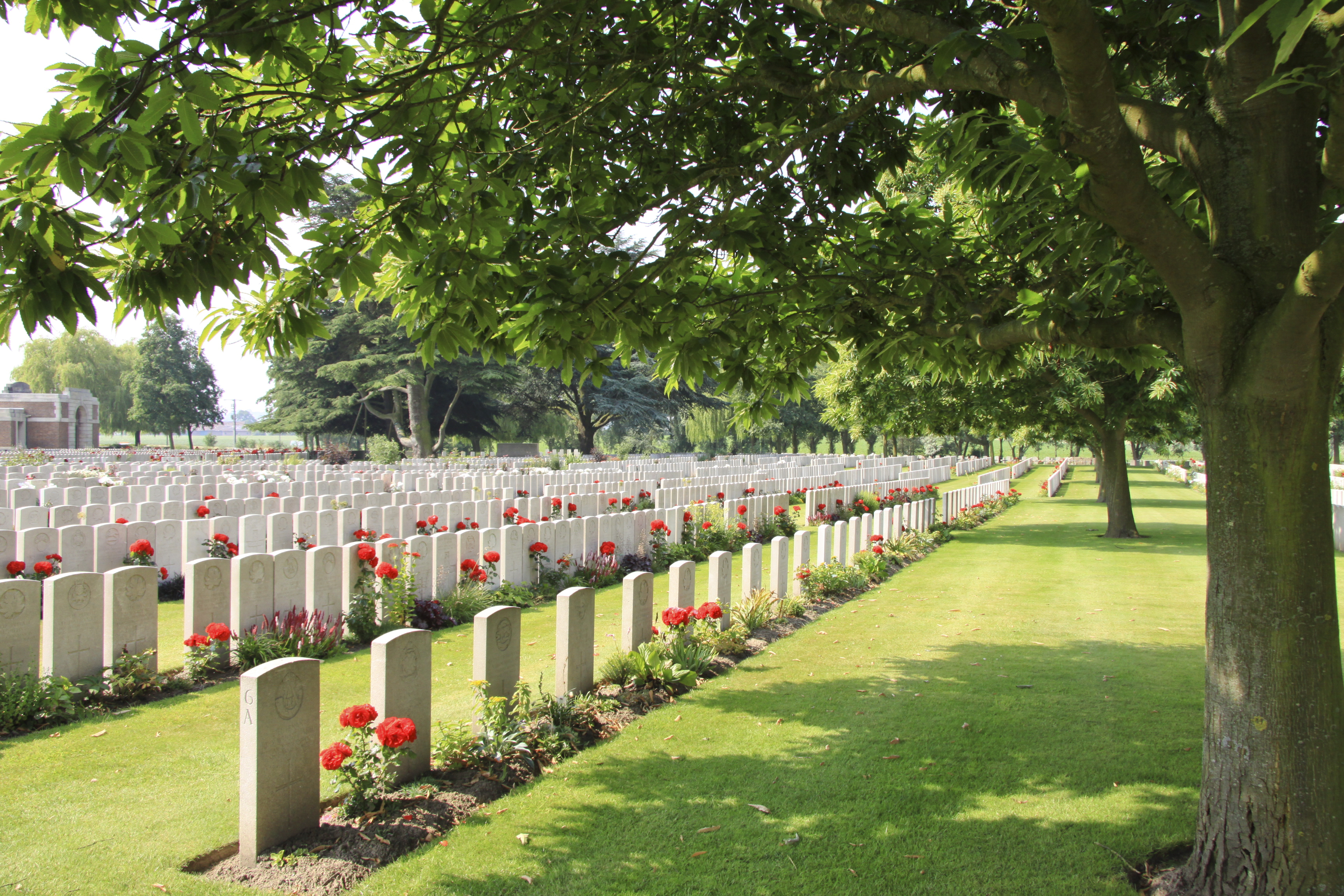
- Used for those deceased 1914–1919
- Established: 1914
- Location: 50°49′45″N 02°42′04″E near Poperinge, West Flanders, Belgium
- Designed by: Sir Reginald Blomfield
- Total burials: 10,785 of which 35 are unnamed

Burials by nation
- * Commonwealth: 9,901 of which 24 are unnamed: United Kingdom: 7,386; Canada: 1,058; Australia: 1,131; New Zealand: 291; South Africa: 29; India: 3; other nationalities: 883 of which 11 are unnamed

Burials by war
- World War I: 10,784 (plus 1 non World War burial)

UNESCO World Heritage Site
- Official name: Funerary and memory sites of the First World War (Western Front)
- Type: Cultural
- Criteria: i, ii, vi
- Designated: 2023 (45th session)
- Reference no.: 1567-FL27

Lijssenthoek Military Cemetery is a Commonwealth War Graves Commission (CWGC) burial ground for the dead of the First World War in the Ypres Salient on the Western Front. After Tyne Cot, it is the second largest cemetery for Commonwealth forces in Belgium. Lijssenthoek Military Cemetery is located near Poperinge in the province of West Flanders. Most of those buried in the cemetery are war casualties who had been wounded near Ypres and later died in the four large Allied casualty clearing stations located in this area.

== History ==
During the First World War, the village of Lijssenthoek was situated on the main communication line between the Allied military bases and the Ypres battlefields. Because of its location close to the Ypres frontline, but out of the range of most German field artillery, Lijssenthoek was chosen as the site of Allied casualty clearing stations. A farm called Remi Quaghebeur became the centre point at Lijssenthoek around which a number of field hospitals were established. During the war, the location was also known as Remy Farm, and many structures in the vicinity were used for medical purposes. Farm buildings also stood just north-west of the modern-day cemetery, and this site was known as Corfu Farm during the war. Rail tracks were constructed from the main railway line to enable ambulance trains to bring Allied wounded into these medical units from Poperinge and to take them from there on to the large military hospitals on the French coast.

The cemetery was originally established at the start of the war by the French Army's 15th Hopital D'Evacuation. Between autumn 1914 and early summer 1915, this unit began to bury casualties who had been treated at their Lijssenthoek field hospital but had not survived their wounds. At this time French military forces were present in the Ypres Salient, holding the Allied front line positions to the north and to the south-east of Ypres.

From June 1915, the cemetery began to be used for dead from British and Commonwealth military medical units. Four Allied casualty clearing stations were located at Lijssenthoek by 1917. Together, they eventually accommodated some 4,000 hospital beds and formed the biggest evacuation hospital in the Ypres Salient. The growing size of the medical facilities reflected the growing scale of injuries and number of casualties being brought back from the Ypres frontline as major offensives were carried out.

In the period of the German advance following the German spring offensive of 1918, the Allied casualty clearing stations at Lijssenhoek were evacuated between April and August 1918. During that time, field ambulances (including a French ambulance unit) took their places.

The first plans to lay out the war cemetery site at Lijssenhoek in its present shape date from 1918. After the end of the war, the original wooden grave markers were replaced with standard Commonwealth War Grave markers made of Portland stone, and the area was carefully landscaped.

In the years since the First World War, a further 41 graves have been added to Lijssenthoek Military Cemetery. These include 24 war dead from several isolated positions near Poperinge, which were reburied in Plot XXXI in 1920, and 17 war dead from St. Denijs Churchyard, which were reburied in Plot XXXII in 1981. There is also one non World War burial here.

In June 2009, a research project on military medicine during the First World War was started at Lijssenthoek Military Cemetery, with a focus on medical assistance behind the front line.

A new Visitor Centre at Lijssenthoek Military Cemetery was opened in September 2012. It is a modern design of glass, steel and concrete that is used for the briefing of groups before they enter the cemetery. There is also a presentation of the history of Remy Farm at Lijssenthoek and the casualty clearing stations once located there.

== Description ==
Lijssenthoek Military Cemetery, designed by Sir Reginald Blomfield, is the second largest Commonwealth war cemetery in Belgium.

The cemetery can be reached via the new Visitor Centre and is accessed through an imposing entrance way with large cast iron gates. The dates 1914-1920 are inscribed above the entrance. There is also an inscription commemorating the fact that the cemetery grounds were assigned to the United Kingdom in perpetuity by King Albert I of Belgium in recognition of the sacrifices made by the British Empire in the defence and liberation of Belgium during the war. Just inside the entrance way are French graves to the left and German graves at the front right, but most of the French and German graves are located towards the rear of the cemetery. As in many other war cemeteries looked after by the Commonwealth War Graves Commission, a Cross of Sacrifice stands in the corner of Lijssenthoek Military Cemetery, and there is also a Stone of Remembrance.

The cemetery is organised into 35 sections (Plots I-XXXV) and contains a total of 10,785 graves, of which 35 are unnamed (for a war cemetery of this size, this is a relatively small number). All but 41 of those buried here are war casualties who died while being treated at the medical facilities in the area during the period 1914–1919. There are 9,901 graves of soldiers from the United Kingdom, Canada, Australia, New Zealand, South Africa and India (24 of the 9,901 Commonwealth war dead are unidentified), and 883 graves of soldiers from 30 other nationalities including France, Germany and the United States (11 of these 883 war dead are unidentified). Eight of the headstones are memorials to men known to be buried in this cemetery, these are located in Plot XXXII near the Stone of Remembrance. A section with 35 graves is for workers of the Chinese Labour Corps who died in the area of Ypres and Poperinge during and just after the First World War. The Chinese Labour Corps was recruited during the war by the British government to free troops for front line duty by performing support work and manual labour. In this role, the Chinese Labour Corps cleared battlefields, dug graves as well as trenches and carried out other such tasks which were often difficult and dangerous.

== Notable graves ==
- Brigadier-General Hugh Fitton CB, DSO, commanding officer of the 101st Infantry Brigade (Plot II, grave A 27)
- Brigadier-General Alister Gordon CMG, DSO, commanding officer of the 153rd Infantry Brigade (Plot XIV, grave A 13)
- Major Henry Barnes, 2nd Baron Gorell DSO (Plot IX, grave B 20)
- Lieutenant-Colonel George Dobbs, English international rugby player (Plot XIII, grave A 25)
- Lieutenant Fred McIntosh, Australian rules footballer (Plot XXV, grave D 17)
- Major-General Malcolm Mercer CB, commanding officer of the 3rd Canadian Division (Plot VI, grave A 38)
- Lieutenant John Raphael, cricketer who captained the 1910 British Lions tour to Argentina (Plot XIII, grave A 30)
- Lieutenant-Colonel Ronald Sanderson, rower and gold medalist in the 1908 Summer Olympics (Plot XXVII, grave G 3)
- Captain James Ogilvie-Grant, 11th Earl of Seafield (Plot II, grave A 4)
- Staff Nurse Nellie Spindler (Plot XVI, grave A 3)
- Major Frederick Tubb VC (Plot XIX, grave C 5)
- Lieutenant-Colonel Donald Swain Lewis DSO (Plot V, grave A 25)
- Brigadier-General Robert Clements Gore CB, CMG (Plot XXVI, grave FF 1)
- Lieutenant-Colonel Jim Nicholas (Plot XIX, grave C 4)
- Major Sir Schomberg Kerr McDonnell GCVO, KCB (Plot II, grave A 7)

== Gallery ==
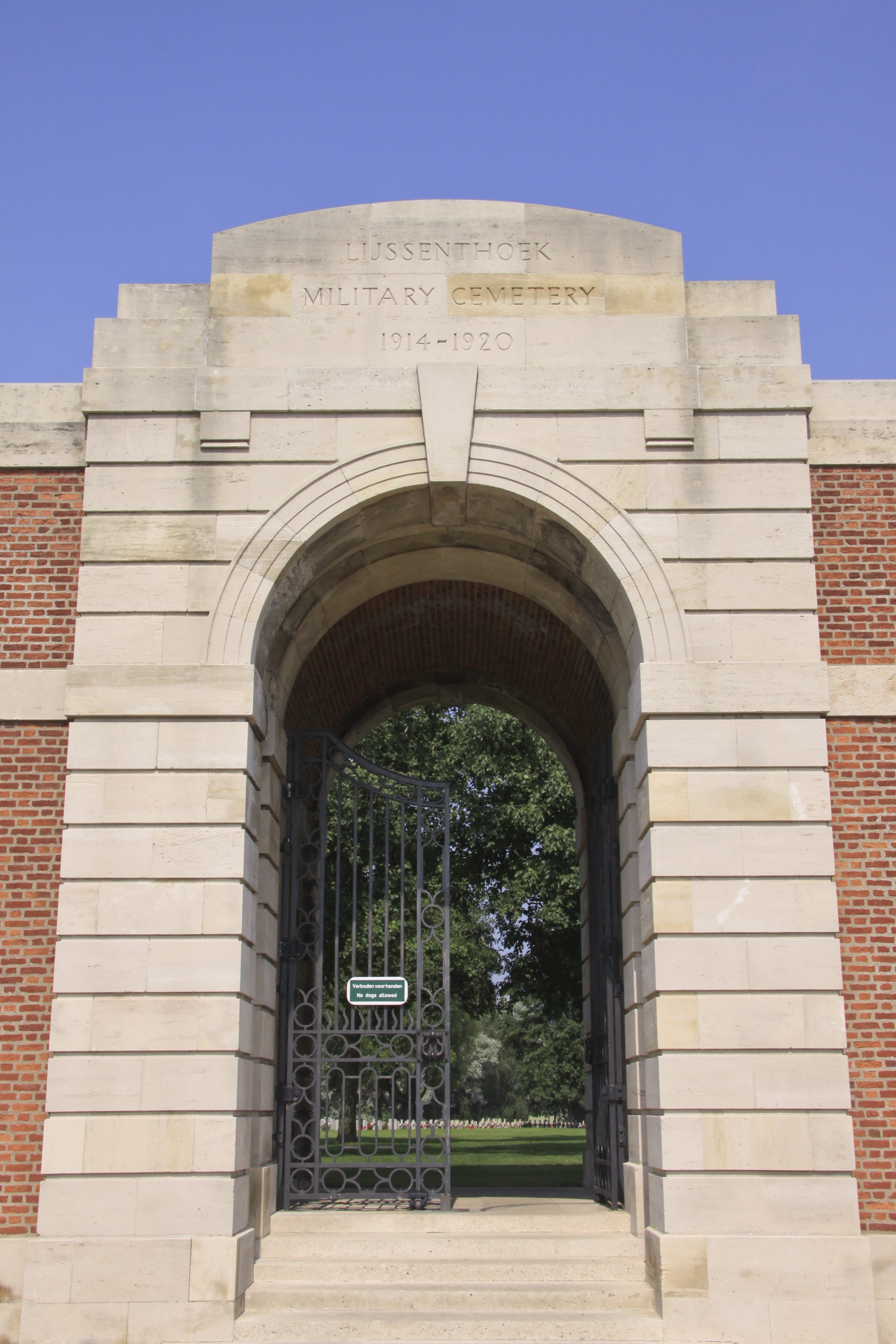
Main gate at Lijssenthoek Military Cemetery

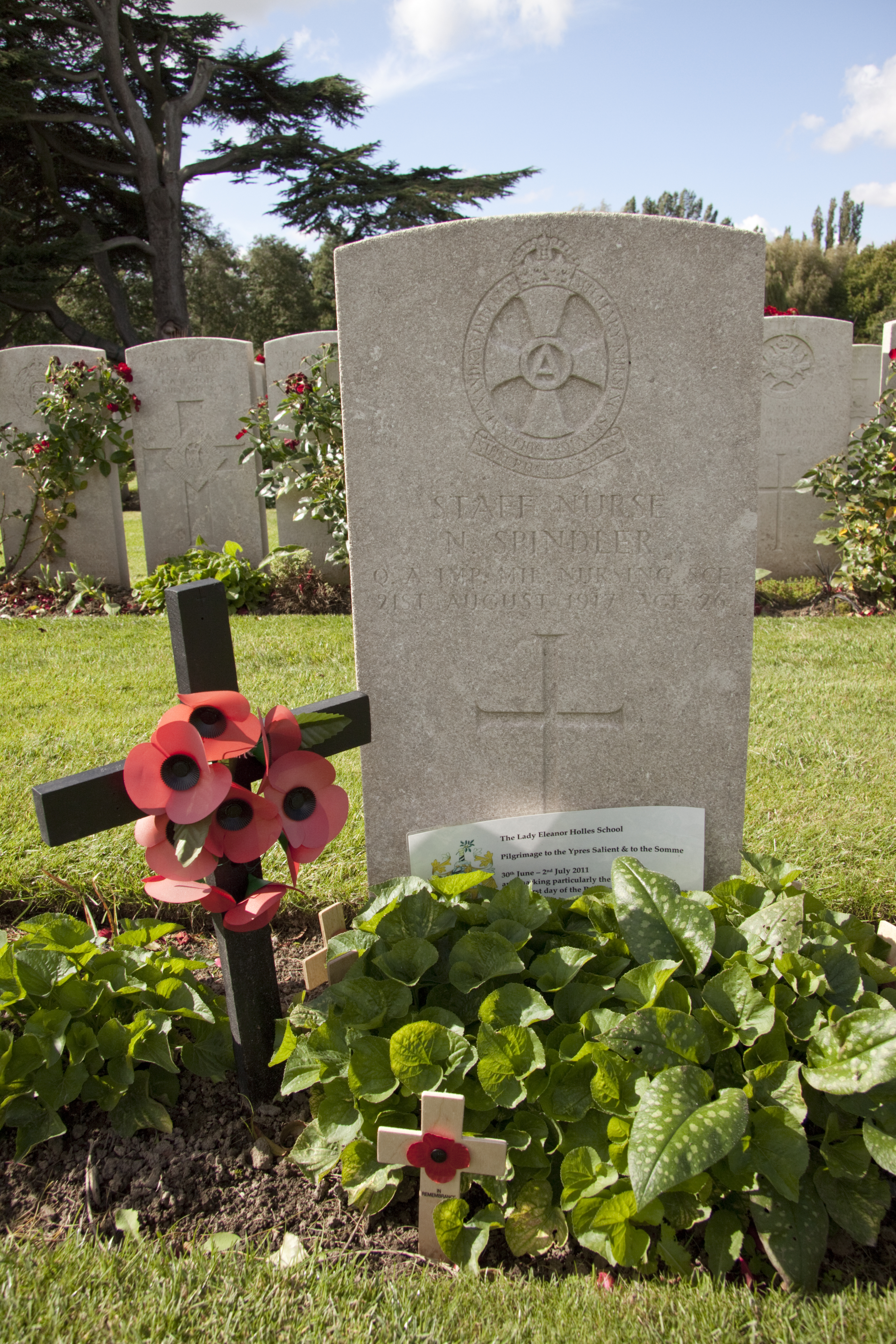
The grave of Staff Nurse Nellie Spindler

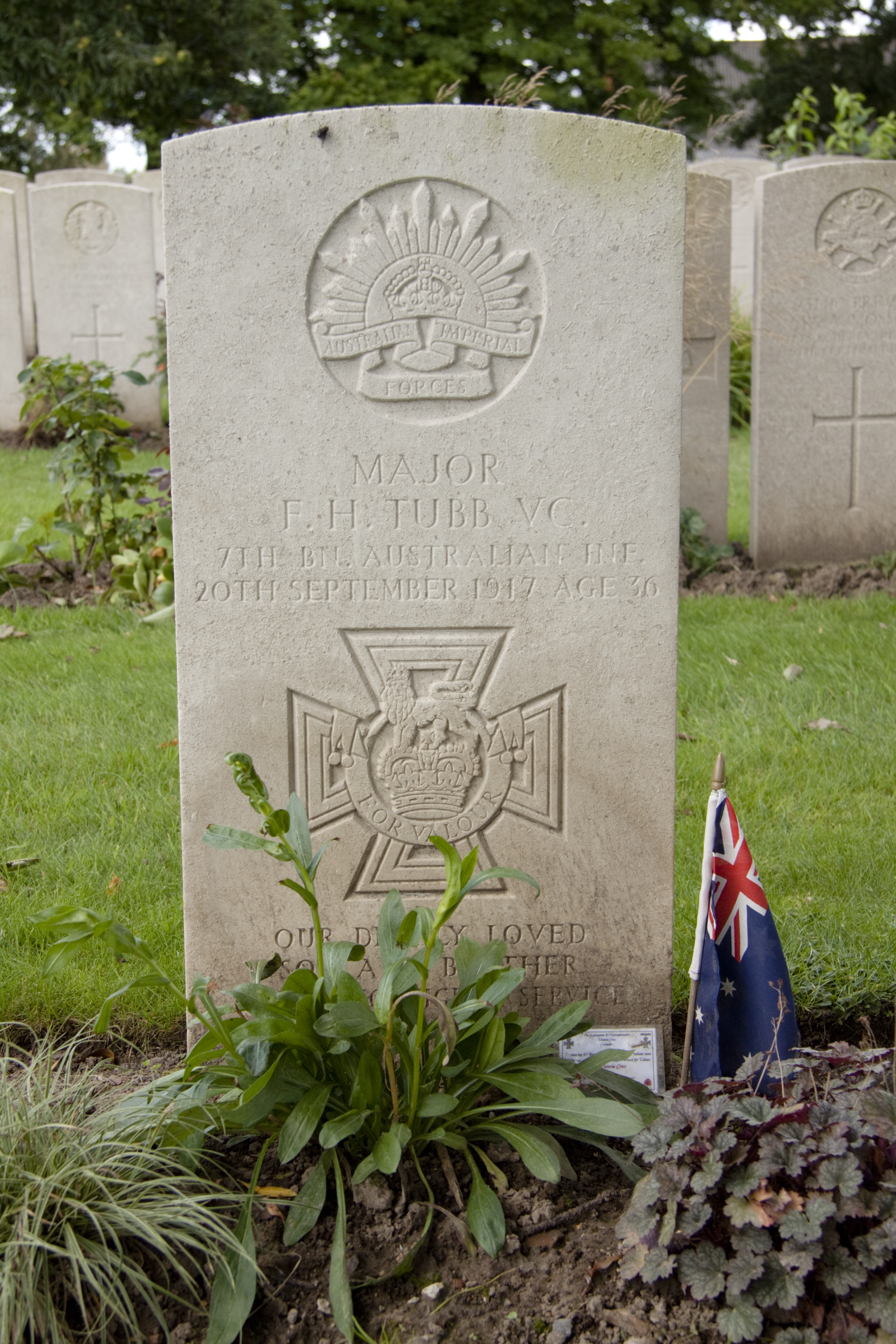
The grave of Major Frederick Tubb VC

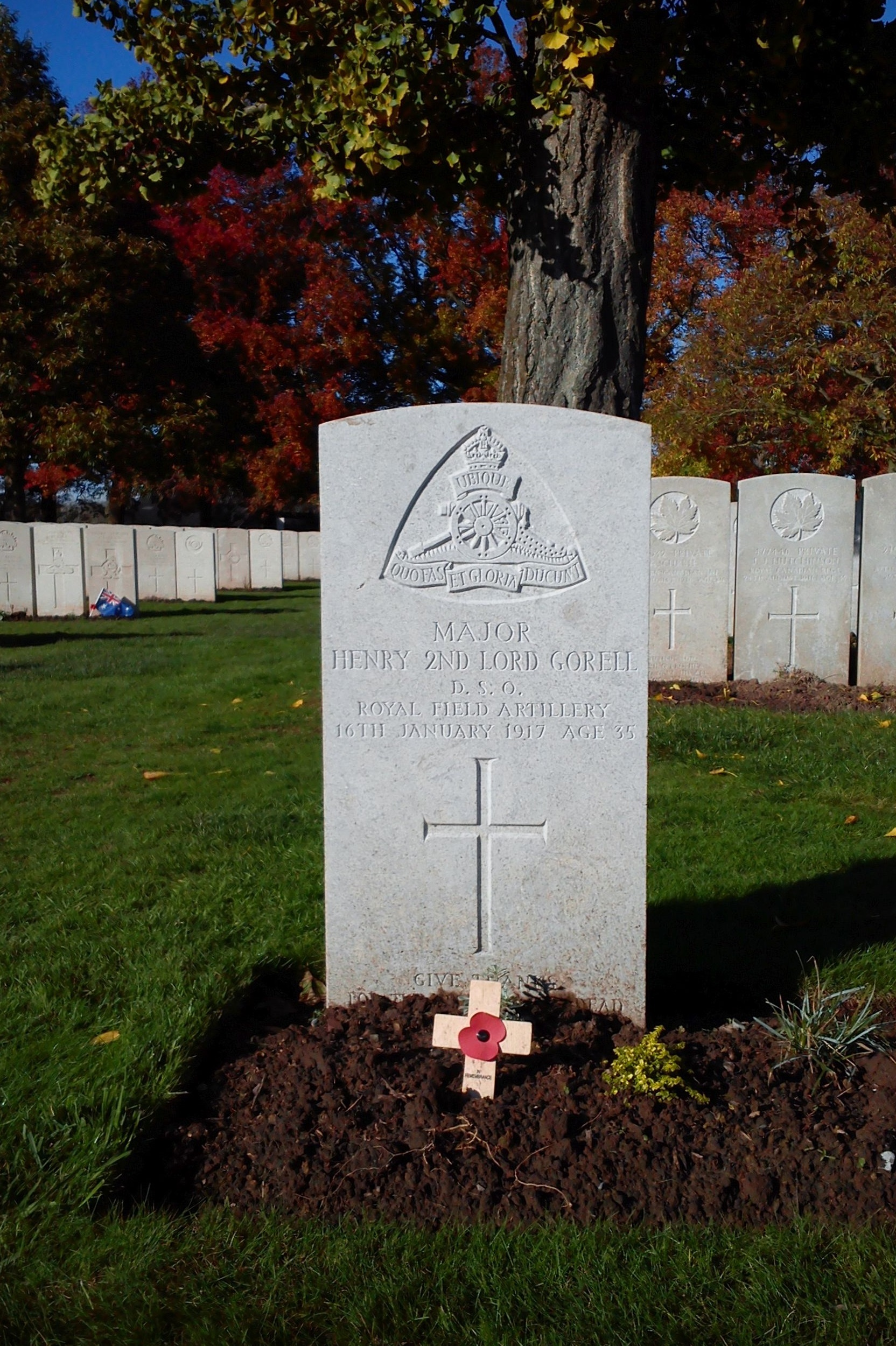
The grave of Major The 2nd Lord Gorell

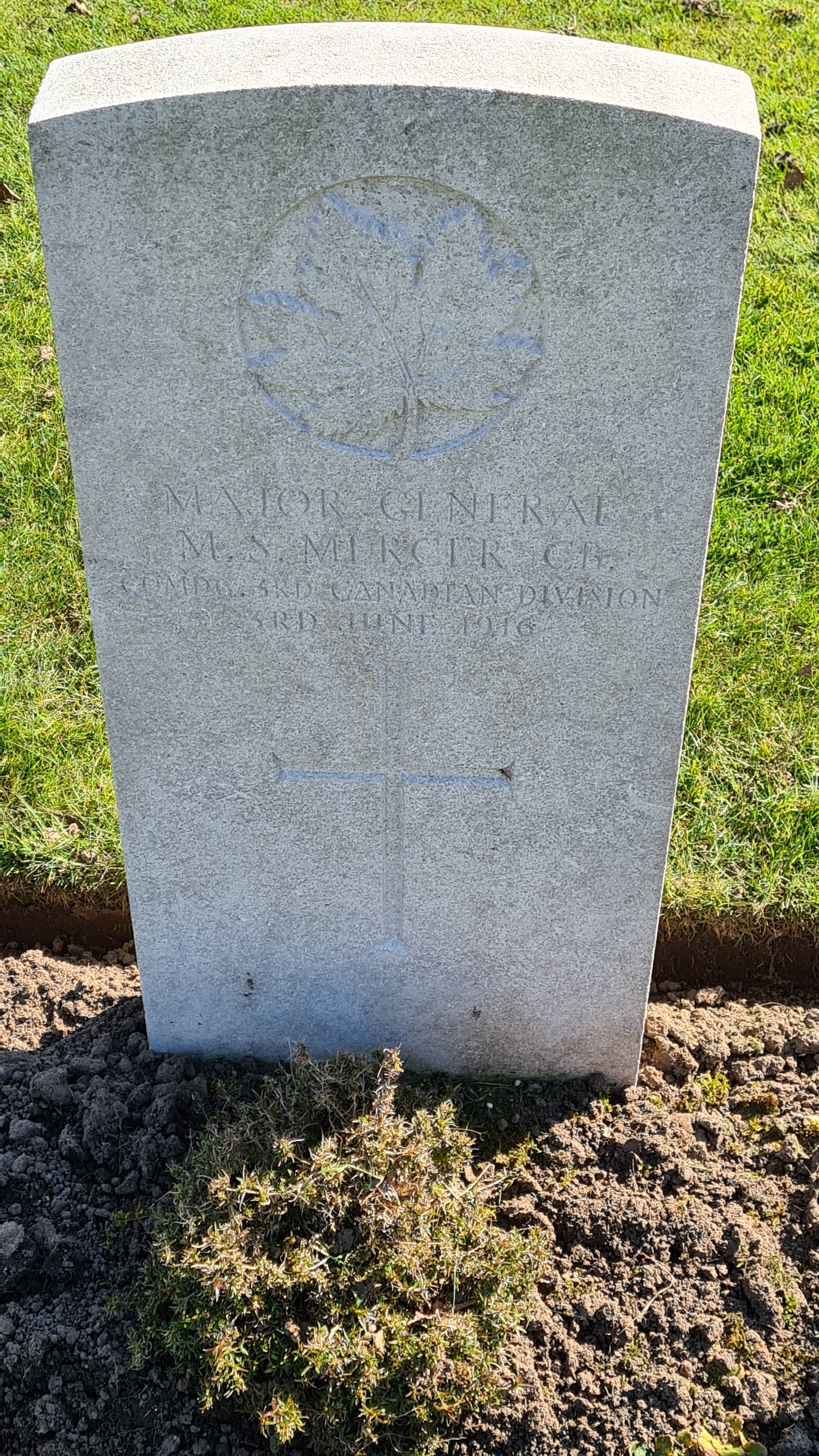
The grave of Major General Malcolm Mercer

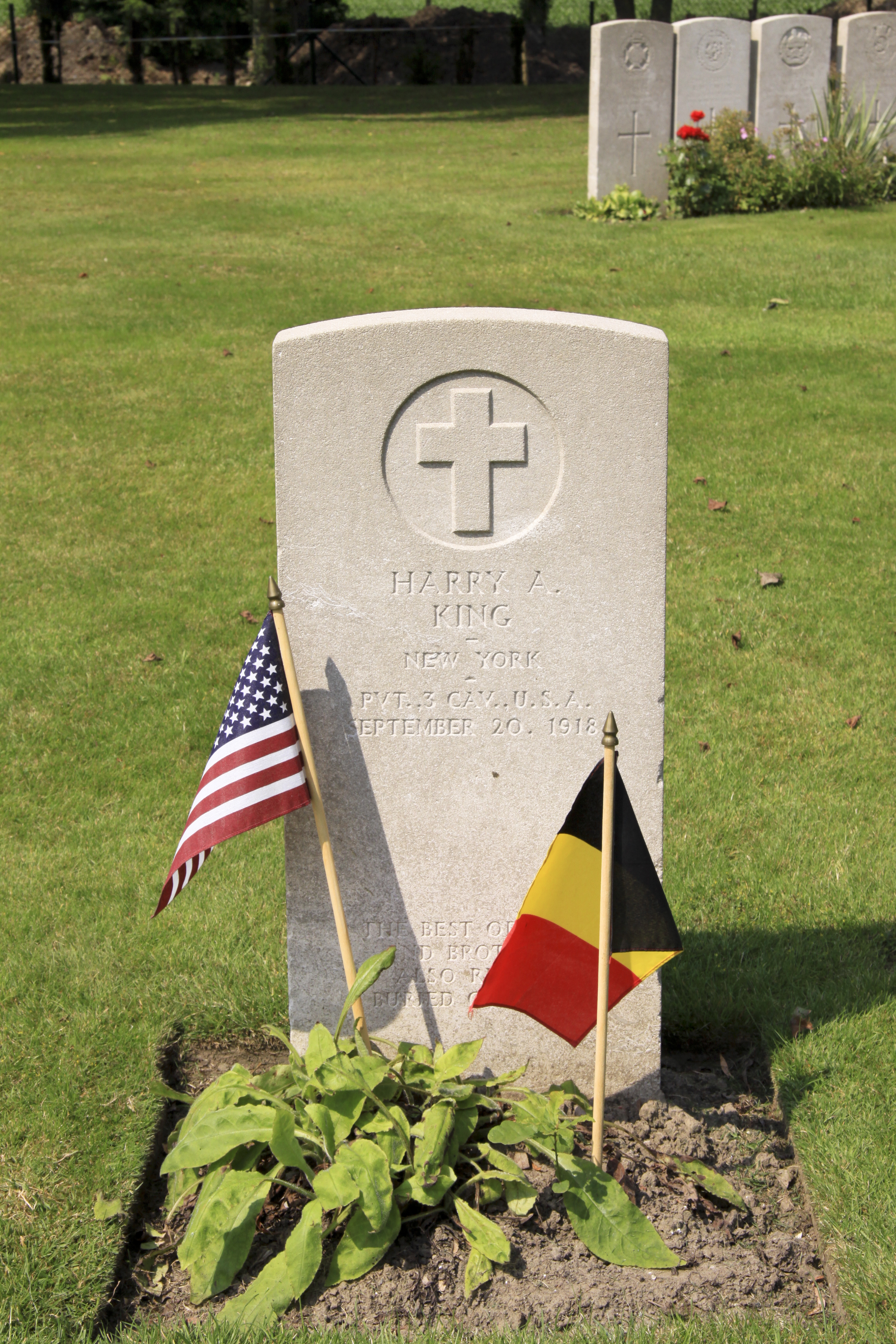
The grave of Private Harry A. King, United States Army

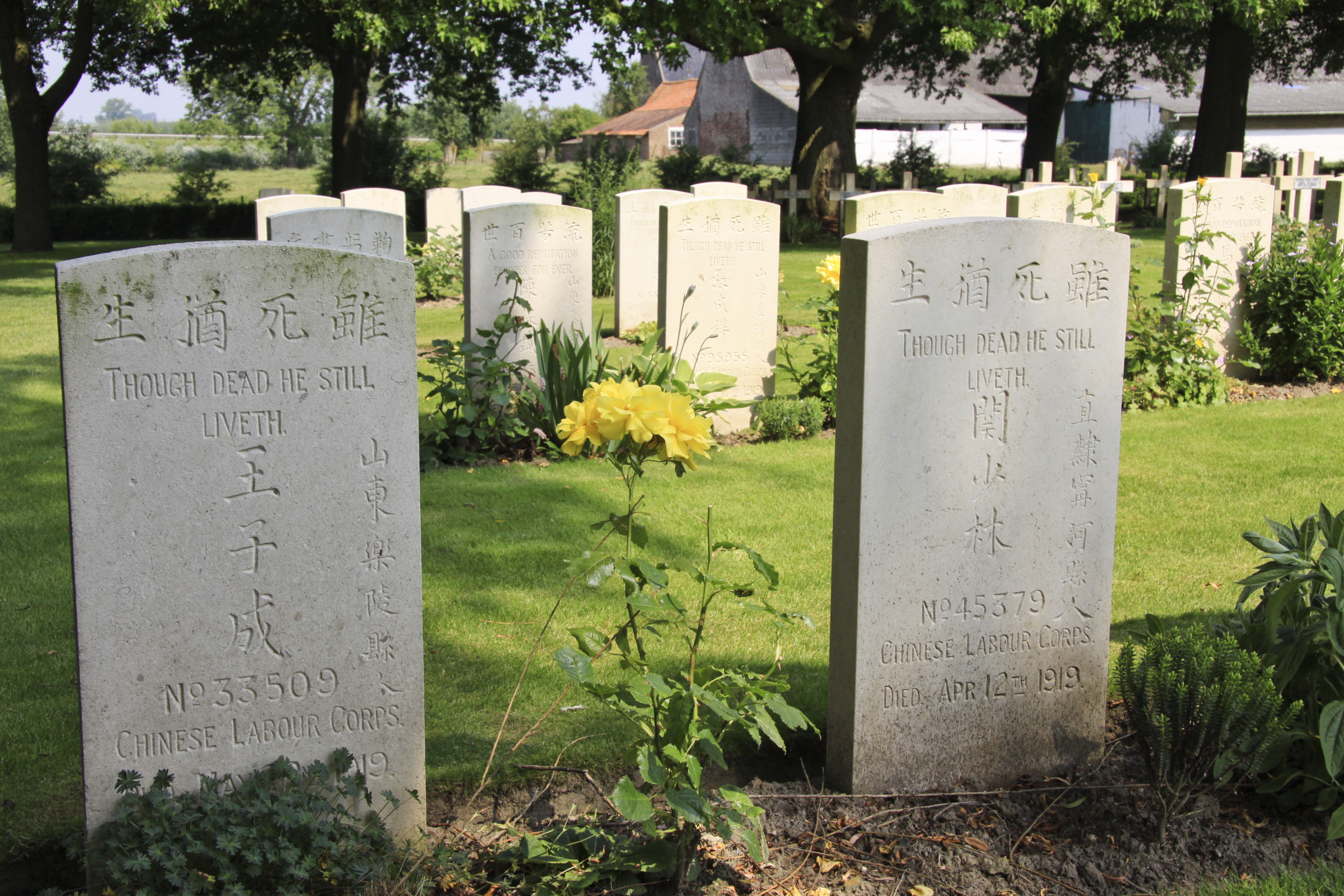
Graves of workers with the Chinese Labour Corps

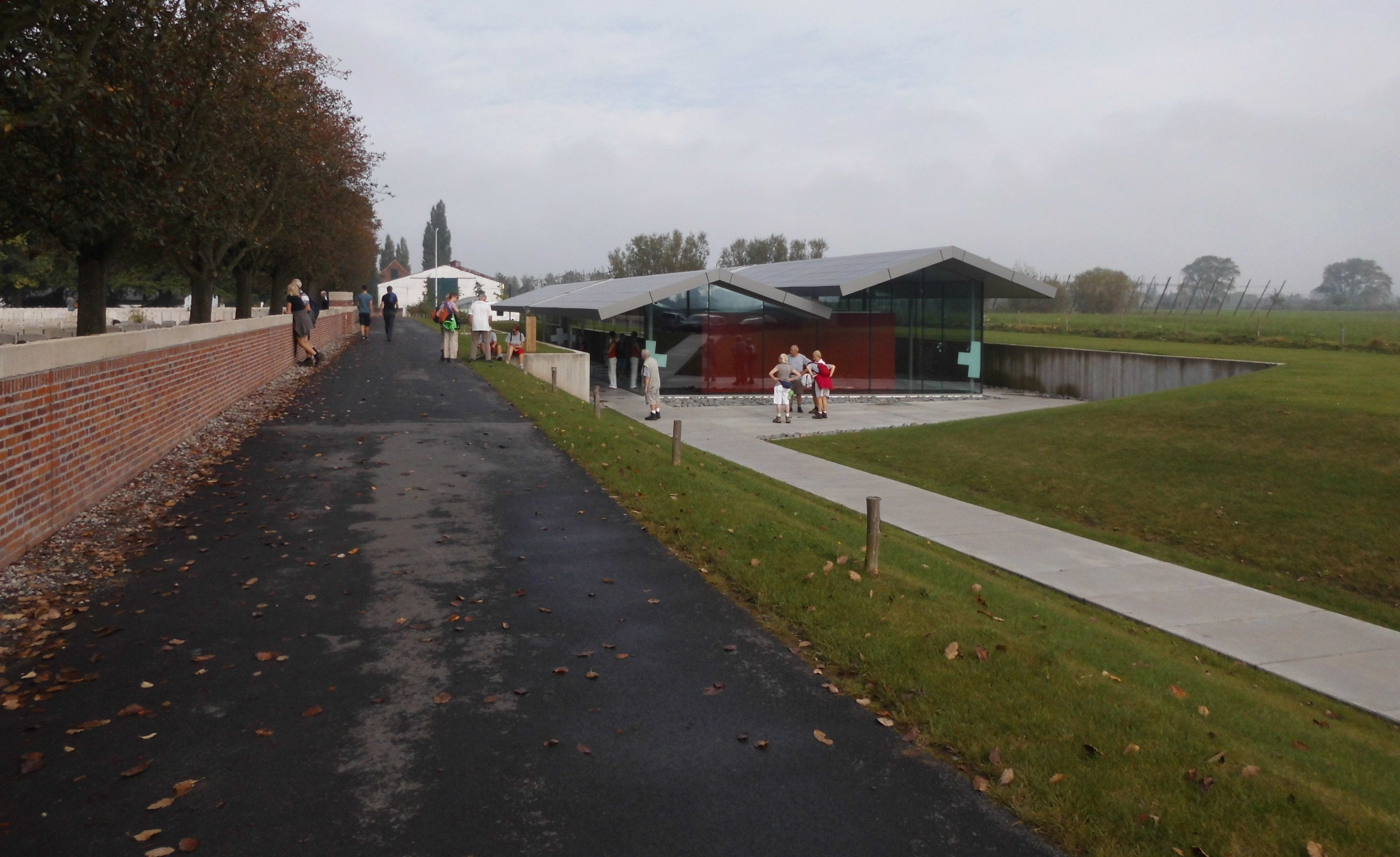
The Visitor Centre at Lijssenthoek Military Cemetery, opened in 2012

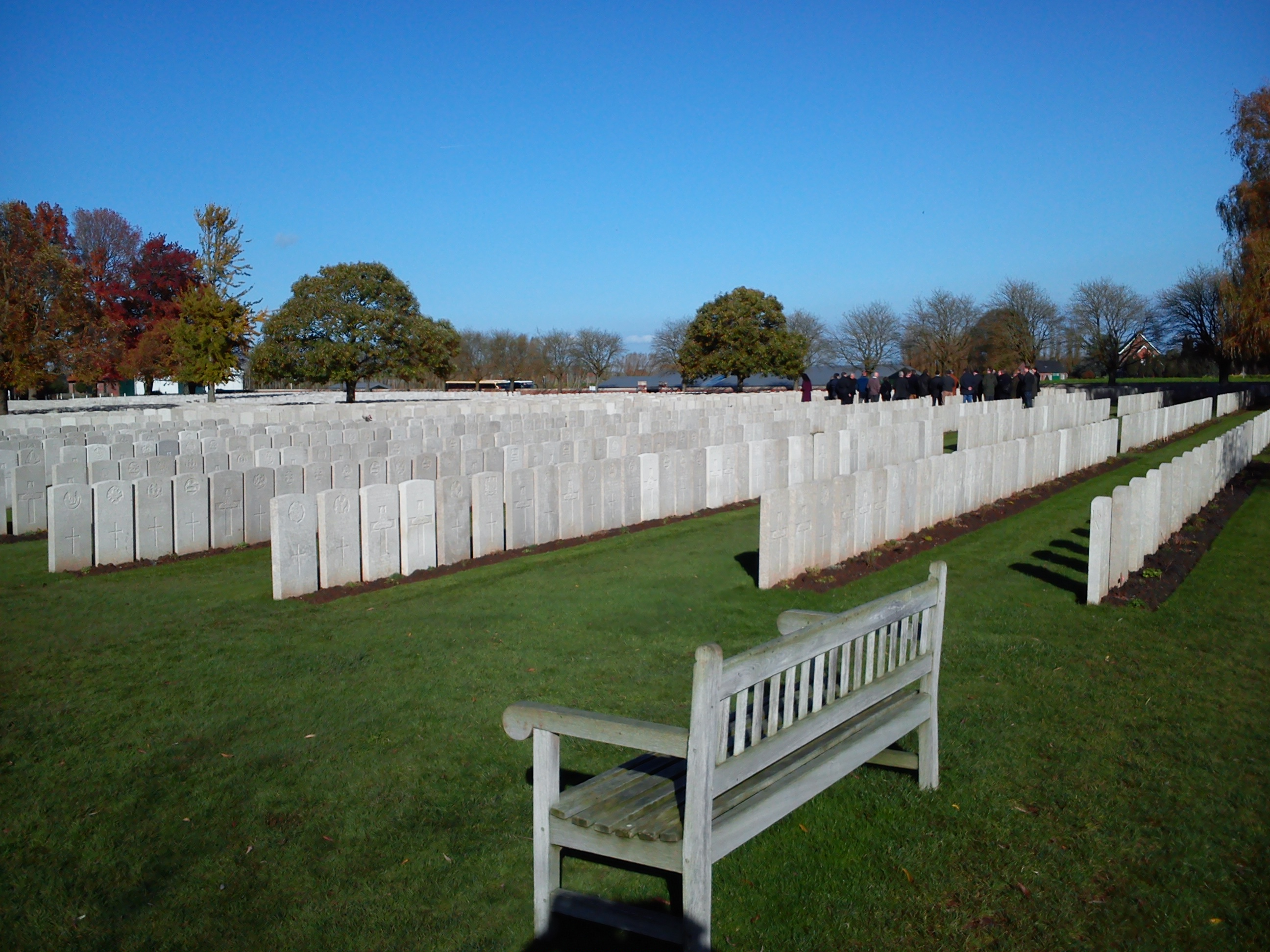
cemetery view

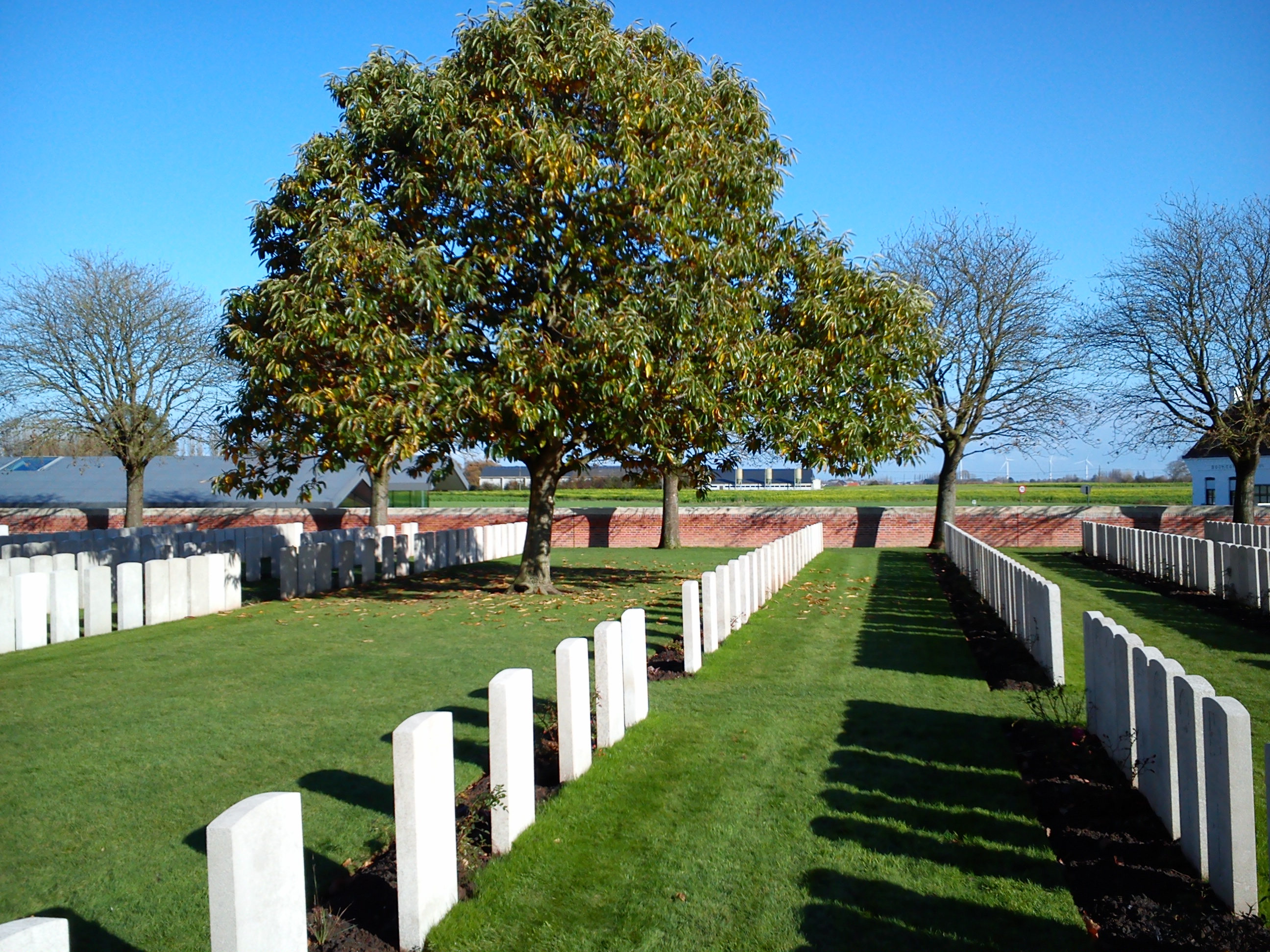
cemetery view

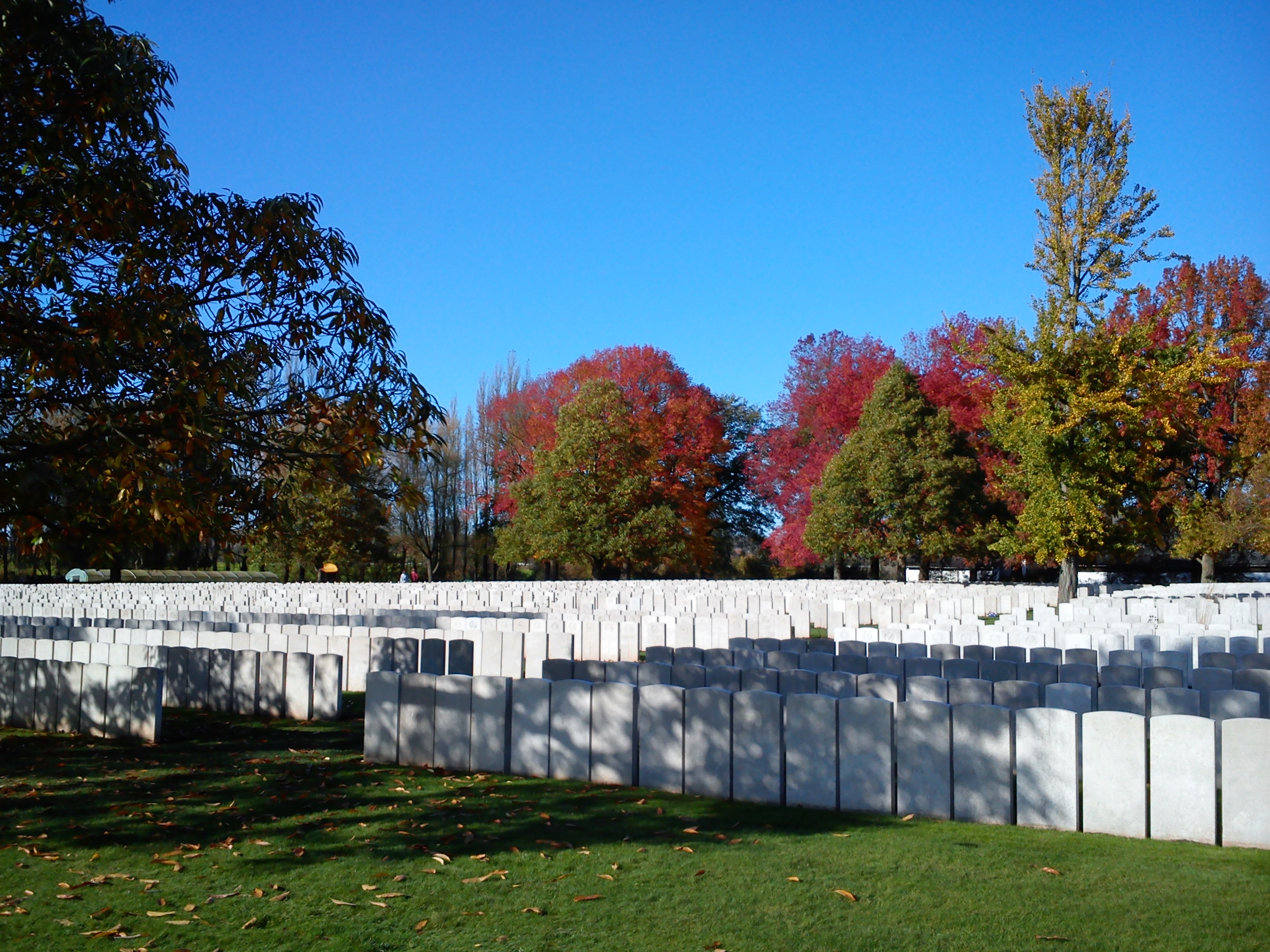
cemetery view

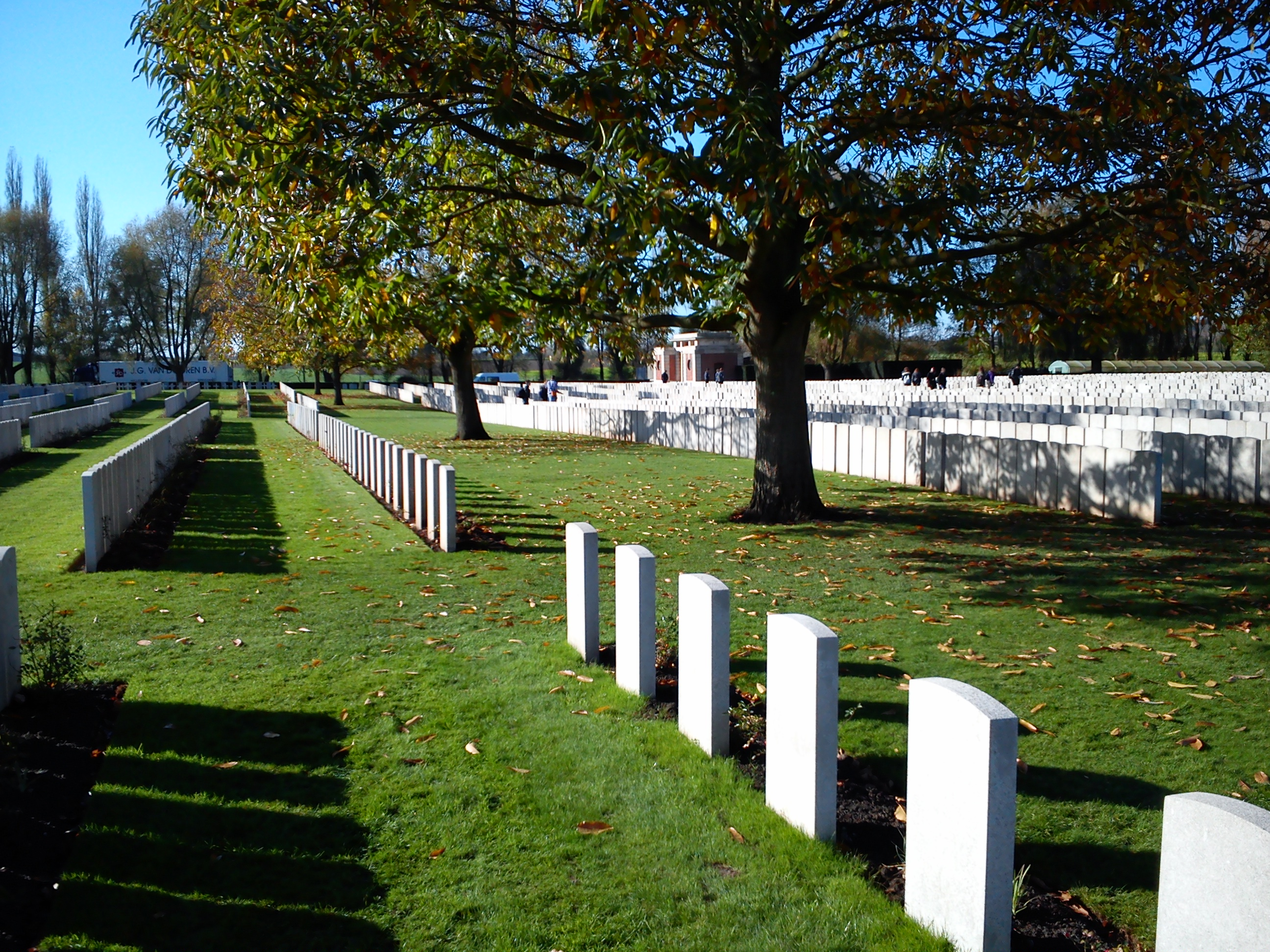
cemetery view

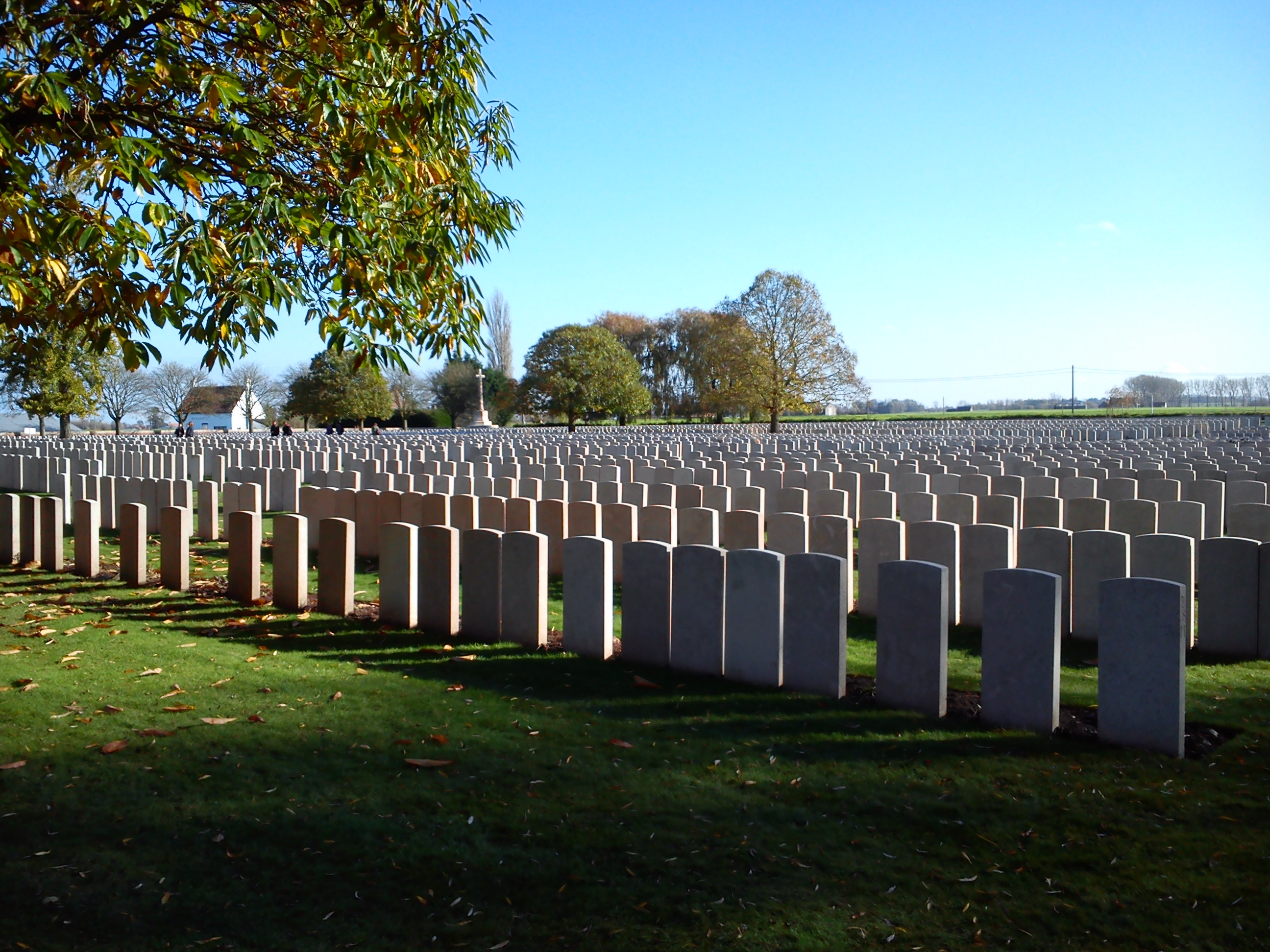
cemetery view

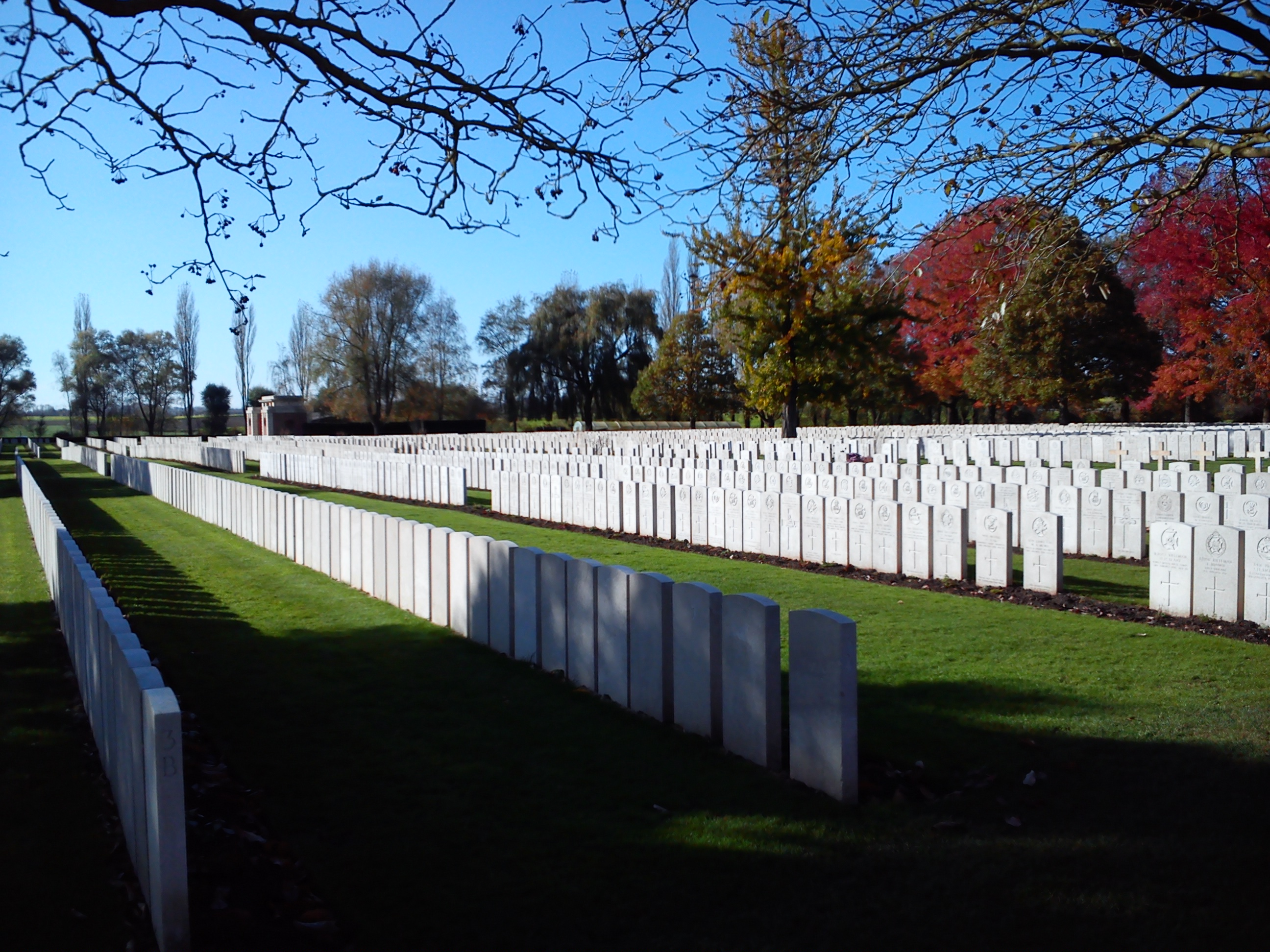
cemetery view

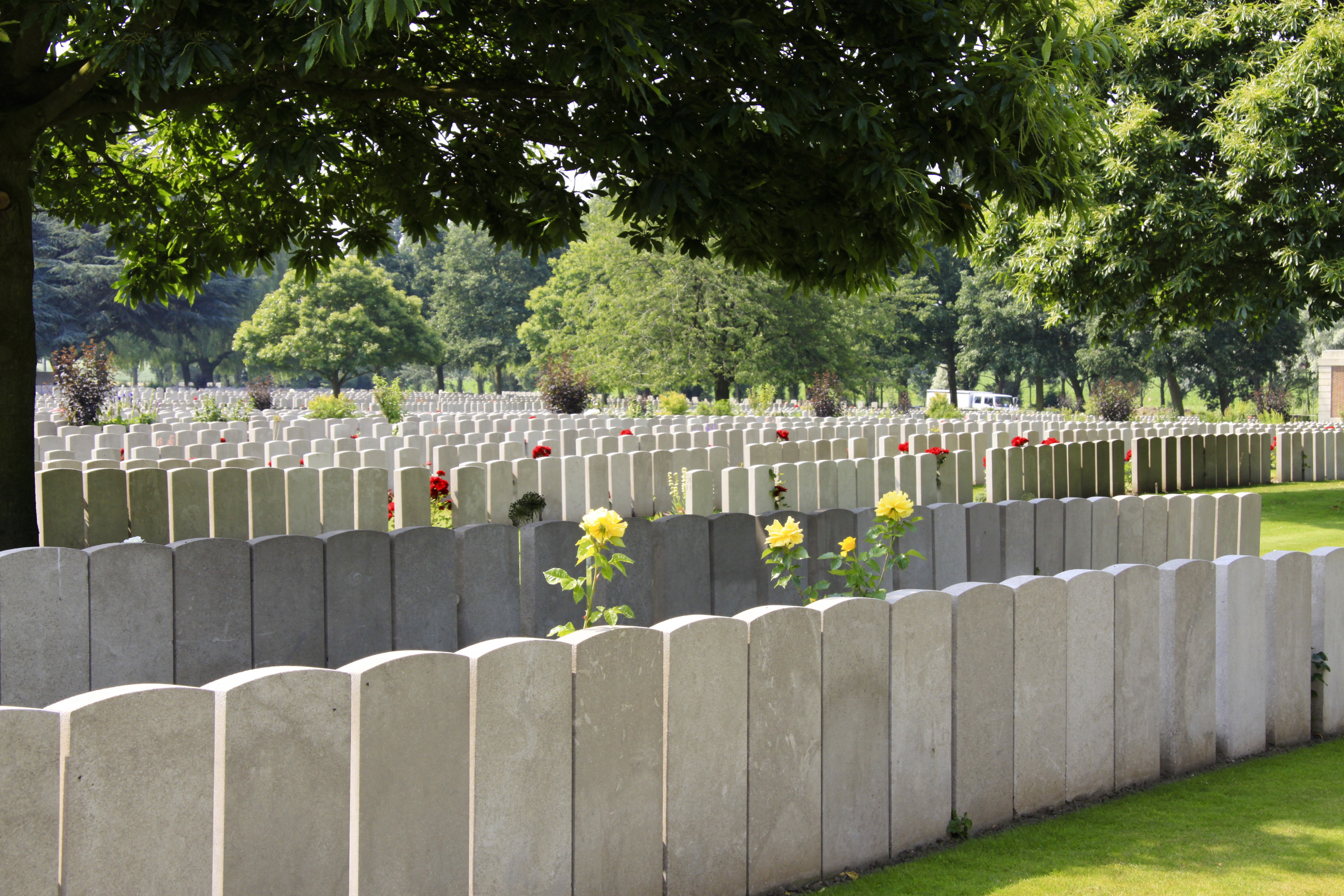
cemetery view

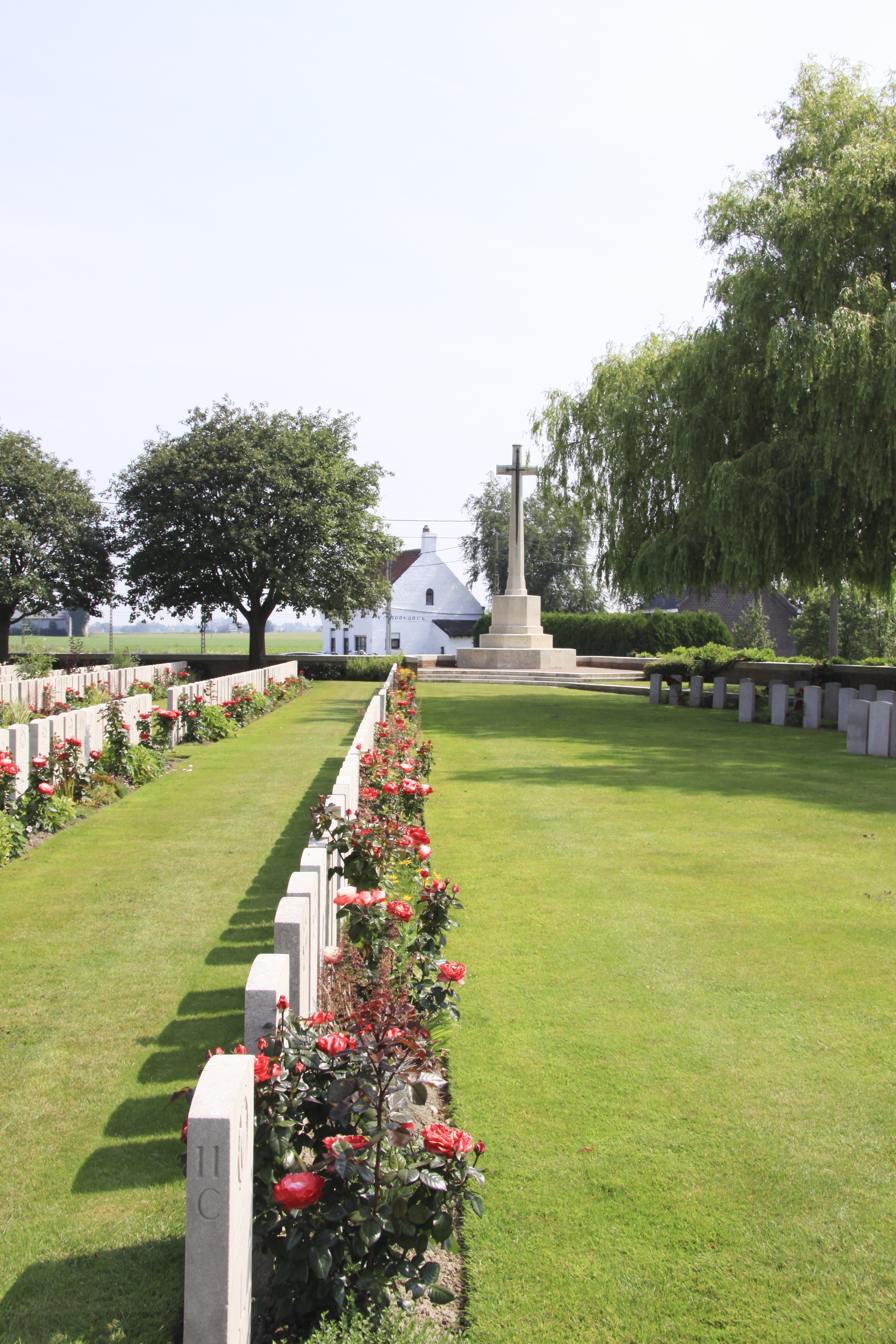
cemetery view
