= Jeff Hook =

Australian editorial cartoonist (1928–2018)

Jeff Hook OAM
- Born: Geoffrey Raynor Hook; 27 December 1928; Hobart, Tasmania, Australia
- Died: 20 July 2018 (aged 89); Frankston, Victoria, Australia
- Website: geoffhook.com

Geoffrey Raynor Hook OAM (27 December 1928 – 20 July 2018) was an Australian artist and editorial cartoonist.

Hook was married to Pauline from 1961 and had five children.

== Career ==
After attending St Virgil's College, Hobart, Hook started as a cadet press artist on the Hobart Mercury and completed a course in graphic arts at the Hobart Technical College (now Tasmanian School of Art, a faculty of the University of Tasmania) which included tuition in fine arts under Jack Carington Smith, Margaret Chandler, Harry Buckey and Edith Holmes.

He started his career as a press artist and part-time cartoonist on The Mercury, drawing under the name "Jeff". He moved to Melbourne and started at The Sun News-Pictorial in 1964. Hook became the full-time cartoonist for The Sun News-Pictorial (later to be merged with the afternoon newspaper The Herald to become the Herald Sun). Jeff was famous for hiding a fishhook in his cartoons, which became his "trademark", and looking for the hidden fishhook became a widespread morning pastime amongst readers of The Sun News-Pictorial.

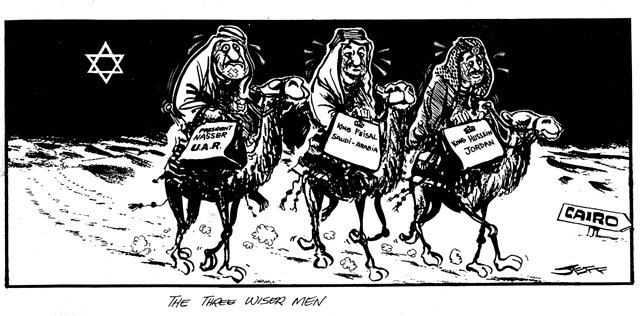
The Three Wiser Men by Jeff Hook. Depicts the end of the 1967 "Six-Day War" with caricatures of Gamal Abdel Nasser (President of United Arab Republic), Faisal (King of Saudi Arabia) and Hussein (King of Jordan). The cartoon includes the artist's trademark fish hook. The cartoon provided Hook with international recognition when it was re-published in The Times.

Hook first gained international recognition in 1967 for his cartoon about the end of the Six-Day War, "The three wiser men", which was re-published widely outside Australia, including in The London Times.

In 1987, Hook won the award for Humorous Illustration in the Australian Black and White Artists Club's Bulletin Awards. Also in 1987, Geoff won the award for the Best Political Cartoon at The International Cartoon Festival at Knokke-Heist, Belgium, and in 1991 he won the award for Best Press Cartoon at the same Festival.

Hook retired from the Herald Sun in early 1993, but continued to freelance, doing a regular editorial cartoon for the Sunday Herald Sun while devoting his time primarily to painting. That continued until the year 2000, when he largely stopped cartooning after holding his first exhibition at the Australian Guild of Realist Artists (AGRA) gallery and pursued his love of painting full-time. After that, Hook exhibited widely at regional art shows and galleries in Australia and held a second exhibition at the AGRA Gallery in 2005.

Over the course of his career, Hook did numerous cartoons and illustrations for papers, magazines and 46 books, including two children's books Harry the Honkerzoid and Planet of the Honkerzoids, written by one of his sons, Brendan, and a children's book of his own, Jamie the Jumbo Jet, which was first published in the mid-1970s, and was revised and reprinted in 1998.

After retiring from full-time cartooning, Hook was awarded the Australian Black and White Artists Club's Silver Stanley Award for lifetime achievement in 1998; and, on 20 March 2009, he was awarded a lifetime achievement award by the Melbourne Press Club. In January 2012, he was awarded an Order of Australia Medal for "services to the print media as a political and social commentator, and as a cartoonist".

== Affiliations ==
Hook was a Life Member of the Australian Black and White Artists Club (now Australian Cartoonists' Association), a life Member of The Melbourne Press Club, a life member of the Media, Entertainment and Arts Alliance, a life governor of the Royal Victorian Institute for the Blind, and a patron of the Amputees Association of Victoria. He was also a member of the Australian Guild of Realist Artists and the Peninsula Arts Society.
