= David Dunstan =

David Dunstan (born 1950) is an Australian writer, journalist and historian.

Dunstan was born in New York of Australian parents, journalist Keith Dunstan and his wife Marie. He was educated at Monash, Melbourne and RMIT universities. He is currently senior research associate with the School of Philosophical, Historical and International Studies at Monash University.

== Publications ==
His books include Governing the Metropolis: Melbourne 1850-1891 (1984), Better Than Pommard! A History of Wine in Victoria (1994), Victorian Icon: The Royal Exhibition Building, Melbourne (1996), Owen Suffolk's Days of Crime and Years of Suffering (2001). His most recent book is A Vision for Wine: a History of the Viticultural Society of Victoria (2013). Together with Tom Heenan he wrote the chapter 'Don Bradman: Just a Boy From Bowral' for the Cambridge Companion to Cricket. He was a founding editor and contributor to the Encyclopedia of Melbourne.

== Activities ==
Dunstan taught Public History and Australian Studies at Monash University from 1994 until 2014. He was Senior Historian with the Historic Buildings Council (now the Victorian Heritage Council) from 1984 to 1989 and subsequently Senior Exhibitions Developer with Museum Victoria. In 2010 he was the Menzies Fellow at the Menzies Centre for Australian Studies, King's College London. He lives in Melbourne.

He has worked as a freelance journalist, writing for newspapers and magazines such as The Age, Business Review Weekly, and The Sun-Herald, and extensively in scholarly journals. He has research interests in the history of Melbourne, the social history of wine and viticulture, the history of newspapers, international sport, international exhibitions, and Australian national identity.
