= Alexander Burton =

Australian recipient of the Victoria Cross

Alexander Stewart Burton VC
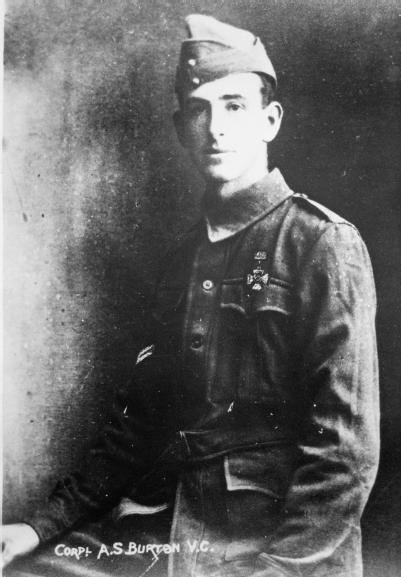
- Born: 20 January 1893; Kyneton, Victoria, Australia
- Died: 9 August 1915 (aged 22); Lone Pine, Gallipoli Peninsula, Turkey
- Military career
- Allegiance: Australia
- Branch: Australian Imperial Force
- Service years: 1914–1915
- Rank: Corporal
- Units: 7th Battalion
- Conflicts: First World War; Gallipoli Campaign; Battle of Lone Pine †
- Awards: Victoria Cross; Mentioned in Despatches

Alexander Stewart Burton, VC (20 January 1893 – 9 August 1915) was an Australian recipient of the Victoria Cross, the highest award for gallantry in the face of the enemy that can be awarded to British and Commonwealth forces.

== Early life ==
Burton was born at Kyneton, in the state of Victoria, on 20 January 1893. His father, a grocer, moved his family to Euroa where he commenced working for a department store. After completing his schooling, Alexander joined his father at the store, working in the ironmongers section.

== First World War ==
Shortly after the outbreak of the First World War, Burton enlisted in the Australian Imperial Force on 18 August 1914 and posted to the 7th Battalion. He embarked with the battalion for the Middle East on 19 October 1914. On 25 April 1915, 7th Battalion landed at Gallipoli but Burton was sick and did not reach the frontlines until a week later. He was promoted to the rank of lance corporal on 10 July 1915 for "having volunteered and taken part in the forcing of Saphead D21 in the face of the enemy".

On 9 August 1915, Burton fought in the Battle of Lone Pine when his company reinforced newly captured Turkish trenches. Burton was one of a party of men that manned a barricade against attacking Turkish soldiers. Killed in this action, he was recommended by his battalion commander, Lieutenant Colonel Harold "Pompey" Elliott, for the award of the Victoria Cross (VC). Two other members of the party, Lieutenant Frederick Tubb and Corporal William Dunstan, were also awarded VCs. Burton's VC was gazetted on 15 October 1915; the citation read as follows:

For most conspicuous bravery at Lone Pine Trenches on the 9th August, 1915. In the early morning the enemy made a determined counter-attack on the centre of the newly captured trench held by Lieutenant Tubb, Corporals Burton and Dunstan and a few men. They [the enemy] advanced up a sap and blew in a sandbag barricade, leaving only one foot of it standing, but Lieutenant Tubb with the two Corporals repulsed the enemy and rebuilt the barricade. Supported by strong bombing parties the enemy twice again succeeded in blowing the barricade, but on each occasion they were repulsed and the barricade rebuilt, although Lieutenant Tubb was wounded in the head and arm and Corporal Burton was killed by a bomb while most gallantly building up the parapet under a hail of bombs.

— The London Gazette, 15 October 1915

Burton has no known grave and is commemorated on the Lone Pine Memorial. He was subsequently mentioned in dispatches by General Sir Ian Hamilton on 28 January 1916.

== The medal ==
In early 1916, the VC, along with a cover letter from King George V, was presented to Burton's father who later wore it for the homecoming of Frederick Tubb, who was a friend of Burton's, and had returned to Australia to convalesce from the wounds received at Lone Pine. Burton's VC remained in his family for many years but in 1967, it was donated to the Australian War Memorial in Canberra, where it is on display.

== Honours and awards ==

| Ribbon | Description | Notes |
| Ribbon for the VC | Victoria Cross (VC) | 9 August 1915 |
| Ribbon for the 1914–15 Star | 1914–15 Star | |
| Ribbon for the BWM | British War Medal | |
| Ribbon for the Victory Medal | Victory Medal | |
| Ribbon for the Victory Medal | Mentioned in Despatches | 28 January 1916 |
