= Nellie Spindler =

English nurse

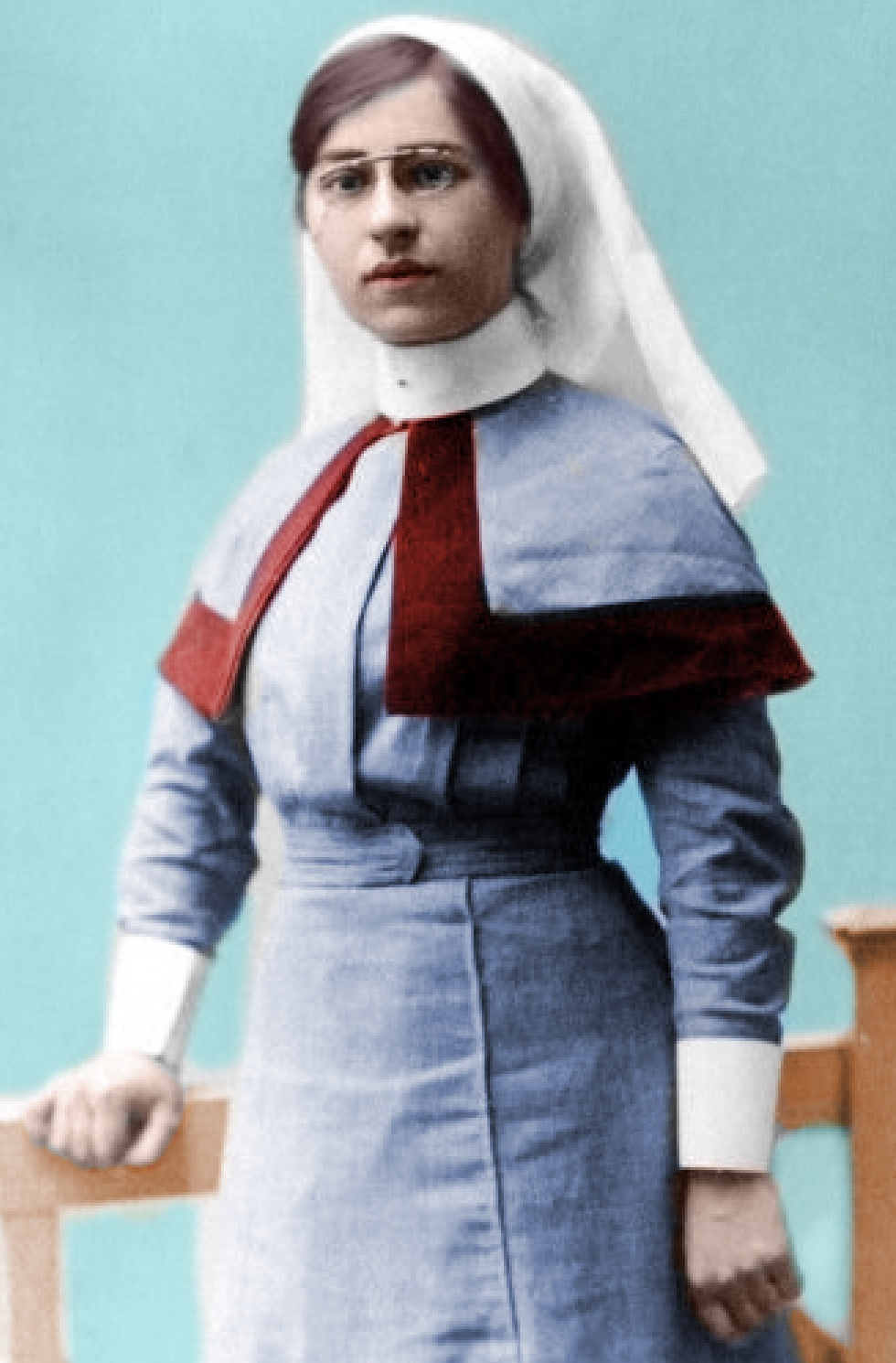
- Colourised version of an undated photograph
- Born: August 10, 1891; Wakefield, Yorkshire, England
- Died: 21 August 1917 (aged 25); Brandhoek, Passchendaele salient, Belgium
- Cause of death: Killed in action
- Years active: 1911–1917
- Medical career
- Profession: Nurse
- Institutions: City Fever Hospital; Leeds Township Infirmary

Nellie Spindler (10 August 1891 – 21 August 1917) was a staff nurse who was killed during the Battle of Passchendaele. She is one of only two British female casualties of World War I buried in Belgium (Note: The other woman casualty to be buried in Belgium is Sister Elsie Mabel Gladstone ARRC, who died of pneumonia on 24 January 1919, age 32 and is buried at Namur.) and the only woman buried among more than 10,000 men at Lijssenthoek Military Cemetery.

== Life ==
Nellie Spindler was born to Elizabeth Snowdon and George Kealey Spindler in Wakefield, Yorkshire. Her father was a police sergeant, and later inspector, in Wakefield City Police.

Spindler entered nursing in 1911 at the City Fever Hospital, Wakefield and trained at Leeds Township Infirmary from 1912 to 1915. She joined the Queen Alexandra's Imperial Military Nursing Service (QAIMNS) in October 1915. To join the Queen Alexandra's Imperial Military Nursing Service it was necessary to be single or recently widowed, to have completed a three-year training course in a hospital approved by the War Office and to be over 25 years old; Spindler was only 24 at the time she signed up. On her application form, she said her year of birth was 1889 rather than 1891. It is possible that this was a mistake, but she may have concealed her true age so she would appear to be old enough to serve.

== Career ==
After being accepted into the QAIMNS, from 10 November 1915 until 24 April 1917 she worked at Whittington Military Hospital, Lichfield. While there she was declared fit for service overseas. In May 1917, she travelled to France and worked in No. 2 General Hospital at Le Havre in the Somme before being transferred to No. 44 Casualty Clearing Station (CCS) which moved to Brandhoek, Belgium, in July 1917. This CCS specialised in abdominal, chest and thigh wounds which needed urgent treatment and so was stationed relatively close to the front line. Though about three miles from the frontlines, Brandhoek was within range of the larger German guns, and with its railway sidings and munitions dumps was the target of frequent German shelling.

On 21 August 1917, the CCS was bombarded and at 11.00am Spindler was hit by an exploding shell along with four other nurses who were concussed. She died 20 minutes later in the arms of Sister Minnie Wood, the sister-in-charge. In a letter home, Sister Kate Luard (Note: Katherine Evelyn Luard was awarded the Royal Red Cross & Bar and was twice mentioned in dispatches; she left nursing in November 1918 to look after her ailing father.) recalled:

Bits came over everywhere, pitching at one's feet as we rushed to the scene. A group of stricken MOs were standing about and in one tent the sister was dying. The piece went through her from back to front near her heart. She was only conscious for a few minutes and only lived 20 minutes. She was in bed asleep. It all made one feel sick.

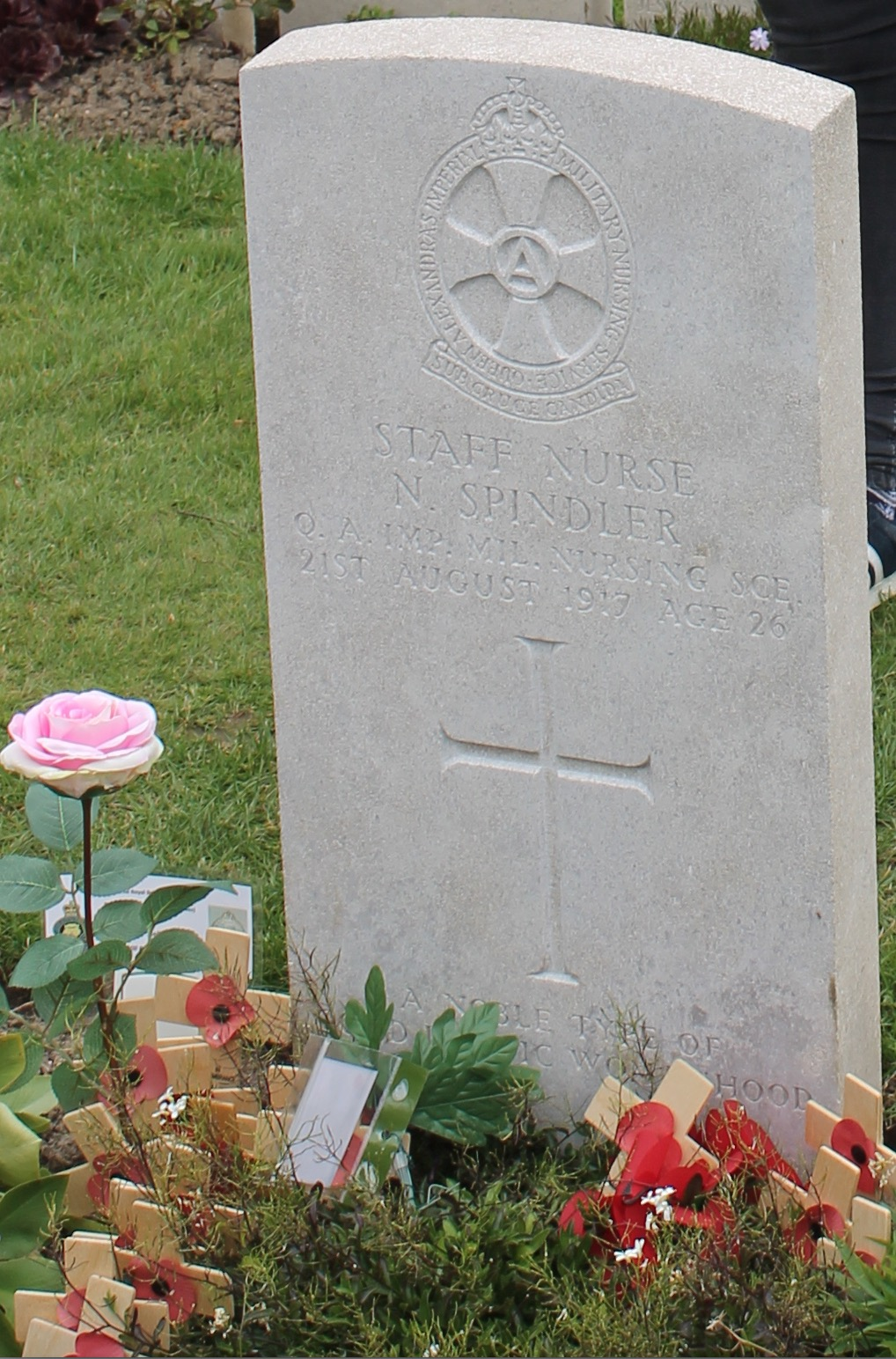
Gravestone of Nellie Spindler at Lijssenthoek Military Cemetery; reference XVI. A. 3.

The British Journal of Nursing on 8 September 1917 stated:

Private communications from Abbeville state that the hospital was shelled all day, that Miss Spindler was struck at 11 a.m., became unconscious immediately and died twenty minutes later in the arms of Nurse Wood of Wakefield, which is also Miss Spindler’s native city, her father being inspector of police.

She was given a full military funeral and the "Last Post" was sounded over her grave, which is quite near the hospital and will be well looked after.

Miss Spindler was 26 years of age, and was trained at the Township Infirmary, Leeds from 1912 to 1915.

From November 1915 to May 1917, she was Staff Nurse at Whittington Military Hospital, Lichfield.

Since May, 1917, Staff Nurse at Stationary Hospital, Abbeville, France.

She was right in the danger zone, but while recognising it her letters were hopeful and cheery. ...

Miss Spindler was very popular during her training, and her loss is deplored by the many friends she made who deeply sympathise with her family in their sorrow.

Patients and personnel were evacuated from Brandhoek to Remy Siding at Lijssenthoek, south of Poperinge. Spindler's body was then taken to Lijssenthoek Military Cemetery. Her death was registered as having been killed in action on a casualty form for officers. She was given a full military funeral the next day. The "Last Post" was sounded and in attendance were General Hubert Gough, C.O. of Fifth Army, three other generals, the Director of Medical Services of the Army, the Surgeon General and over 100 other officers. The condolence card on General Gough's wreath read 'with deepest respect' and was sent to her mother on 3 September.

Her gravestone bears the inscription "A noble type of good heroic womanhood". Her name is included in the memorial screens at York Minster's Five Sisters window.

== Recognition ==
In 2018 a half-mile long new road linking to Wakefield's new Eastern Relief Road in Stanley was named Nellie Spindler Drive following a public vote.
