= Melbourne Press Club =

Journalists organisation in Melbourne, Victoria, Australia

The Melbourne Press Club (MPC), is a not-for-profit association of journalists in the city of Melbourne, Australia. It runs the annual Quill Awards for Excellence in Victorian Journalism.

== Governance ==
MPC is a not-for-profit association of journalists.

As of October 2024, Michael Bachelard was elected as the new President of the organisation. This followed the resignation of ABC reporter Ashlynne McGhee after her tenure as President of more than two years, as well as nearly ten years as a board member.

One of the former Presidents of the club was the legendary Melbourne journalist, columnist and writer Keith Dunstan, who in 1991 wrote the book Informed Sources, a history of the club, its origins, and its predecessors. The club's website hosts an updated version of Dunstan's work.

== Awards and events ==
=== Quill Awards ===
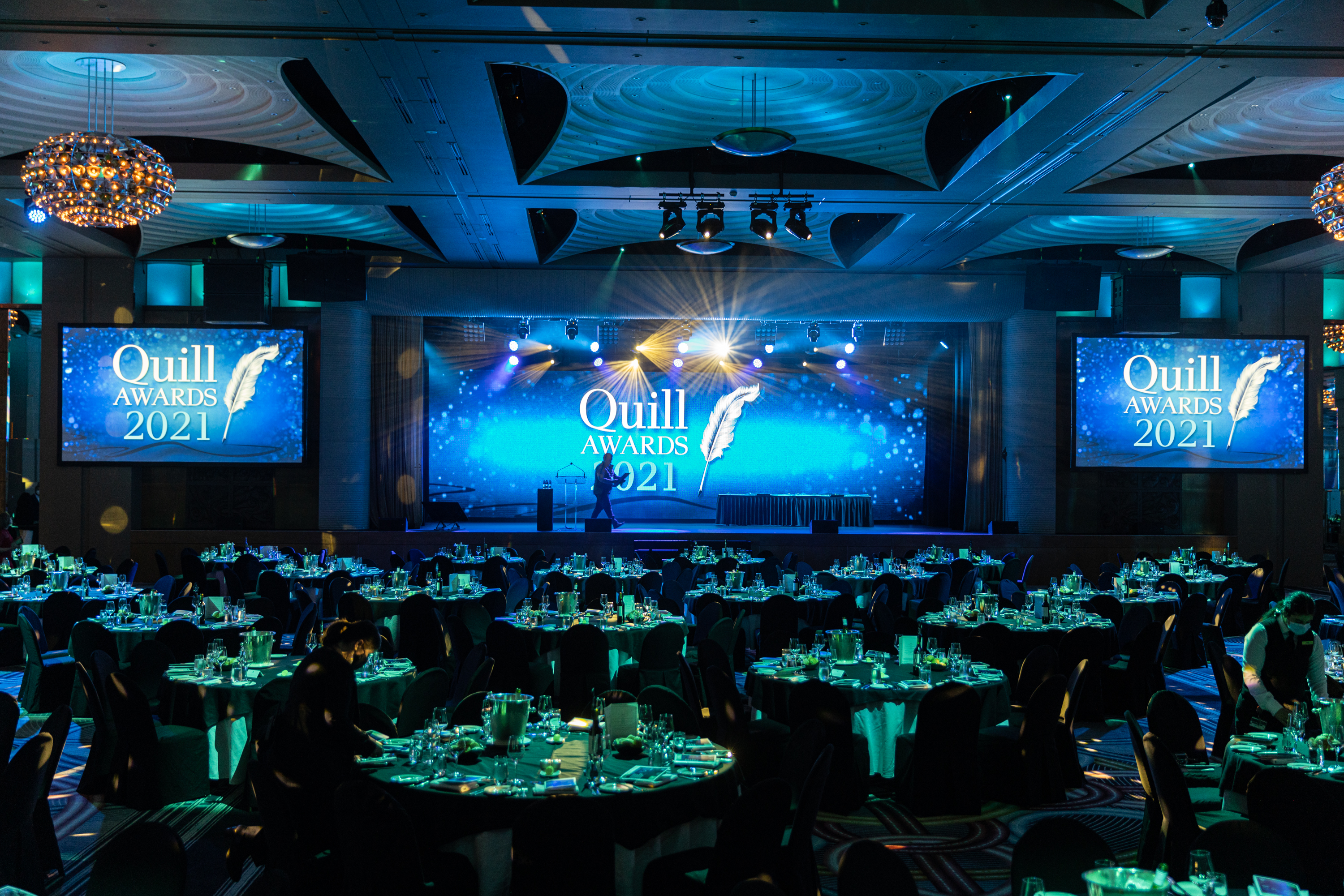
The 2021 Melbourne Press Club Quill Awards room pre-event

The Melbourne Press Club provides awards in the state of Victoria for outstanding journalism, presenting the annual Quill Awards for Excellence in Victorian Journalism (usually referred to as simply the Quill Awards, or Quills). The Young Journalist of the Year Award was created in 1993.

As of 2024 the Quill Awards has the following categories:

- Artwork
- Best Breaking News or Live Coverage, sponsored by The Lottery Corporation
- Best Coverage of an Issue
- Business News/Feature, sponsored by McGrathNicol
- Cartoon
- Coverage of Women in Sport, sponsored by the Office for Women in Sport and Recreation
- Excellence in Indigenous Affairs Reporting, sponsored by the Federation of
- Traditional Owners
- Excellence in Science, Medical and Health Reporting, sponsored by University of Melbourne
- Feature Writing
- Features Photograph
- Grant Hattam Quill for Investigative Journalism, sponsored by the Herald & Weekly Times
- Innovation in Journalism, sponsored by Ryman Healthcare
- Keith Dunstan Quill for Commentary
- Multicultural Affairs and Media, in partnership with Gandel Foundation
- News Photograph
- News Reporting in Writing
- Podcasting
- Radio Current Affairs
- Radio News
- Regional and Rural Journalism, sponsored by TAC
- Reporting on Disability Issues, sponsored by the Victorian Government
- Scoop of the Year
- Sports Feature
- Sports News
- Sports Photograph
- TV Camera Work (Creative)
- TV Camera Work (Shot of the Year)
- TV/Video Feature
- TV/Video News
- Young Journalist of the Year, sponsored by Wilnic Family Trust

The Gold Quill is presented to the best category winner.

=== Other awards and events ===
At the annual Quills awards events, MPC also presents two national awards:

- Graham Perkin Australian Journalist of the Year Award
- Harry Gordon Australian Sports Journalist of The Year

From 2011 until 2018, MPC hosted the Australian Media Hall of Fame, which honours "reporters, editors, broadcasters, photographers, cartoonists and commentators who have made a significant contribution to the development of Australian media".

The MPC holds lunches for the press to meet with high-profile political leaders, business leaders and figures relevant to significant public issues. The Journalism 2007 Conference was sponsored by MPC in 2007, and in 2007, Prime Minister John Howard made an address to the MPC regarding Australia's Climate Change Policy.

== External sources ==
- Official website
- About the Australian Media Hall of Fame
