= Frederick Tubb =

Recipient of the Victoria Cross

Frederick Harold Tubb
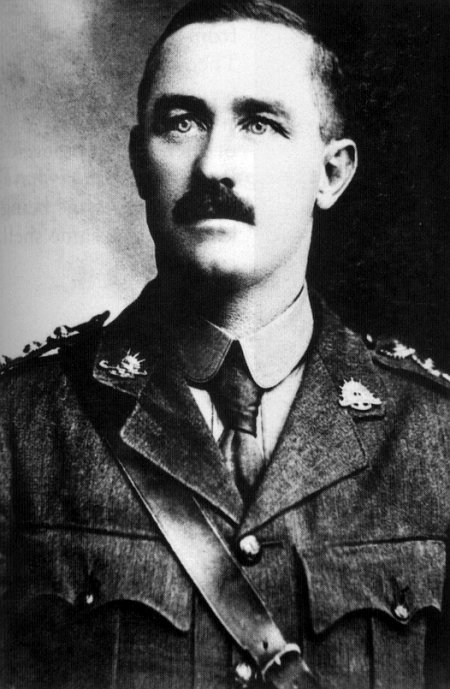
- Captain Frederick Tubb c.1916
- Born: 28 November 1881; Longwood, Australia
- Died: 20 September 1917 (aged 35); Lijssenthoek, Belgium
- Burial place: Lijssenthoek Military Cemetery
- Military career
- Allegiance: Australia
- Branch: Australian Army
- Service years: 1900–17
- Rank: Major
- Units: 7th Battalion
- Conflicts: First World War; Gallipoli Campaign; Battle of Lone Pine; Western Front; Battle of Passchendaele; Battle of the Menin Road Ridge (DOW)
- Awards: Victoria Cross

Major Frederick Harold Tubb, VC (28 November 1881 – 20 September 1917) was an Australian recipient of the Victoria Cross, the highest award for gallantry in the face of the enemy that can be awarded to British and Commonwealth forces.

== Life and military ==
Tubb was born on 28 November 1881 to Harry and Emma E. Tubb, of St. Helena, Longwood East, Victoria, Australia.

He was 33 years old, and a lieutenant in the 7th Battalion, Australian Imperial Force, during the First World War, when he was awarded the VC for his actions on 9 August 1915 at Lone Pine, Gallipoli. Lieutenant Tubb held a newly captured trench which was being counter-attacked by the enemy, who blew in a sand-bag barricade, leaving only a foot of it standing. Tubb led his men back, repulsed the enemy and rebuilt the barricade. Twice more the enemy blew in the barricade, but on each occasion this officer, although wounded in the head and arm, held his ground and assisted by corporals Alexander Burton and William Dunstan, rebuilt it, and maintained the position under heavy bombardment.

=== Citation ===
For most conspicuous bravery and devotion to duty at Lone Pine trenches, in the Gallipoli Peninsula, on 9th August, 1915. In the early morning the enemy made a determined counter attack on the centre of the newly captured trench held by Lieutenant Tubb. They advanced up a sap and blew in a sandbag barricade, leaving only one foot of it standing, but Lieutenant Tubb led his men back, repulsed the enemy, and rebuilt the barricade. Supported by strong bombing parties, the enemy succeeded in twice again blowing in the barricade, but on each occasion Lieutenant Tubb, although wounded in the head and arm, held his ground with the greatest coolness and rebuilt it, and finally succeeded in maintaining his position under very heavy bomb fire.

— The London Gazette, No. 29328 15 October 1915

On 27 March 1916, the Honolulu Star-Bulletin published a story that Tubb was one of four Australians who survived from a regiment of 1128 men wiped out on the "bloody slopes of Anzac Cove in the Dardanelles campaign." He later achieved the rank of major and died of wounds suffered in battle at Polygon Wood, in the Third Battle of Ypres, on 20 September 1917. In that action, Major Tubb was serving with 7th Battalion, 2nd Brigade, 1st Australian Division when he was shot by a German sniper during the Battle of the Menin Road Ridge. While being carried to the rear he was struck by British artillery shells. He died at the dressing station at Lijssenthoek and was buried at Lijssenthoek Military Cemetery, Belgium.

== Medals ==
His Victoria Cross is displayed at the Australian War Memorial in Canberra, along with the eight other Australian Gallipoli VCs.

Tubb was awarded:

- Victoria Cross
- 1914-15 Star
- British War Medal
- Victory Medal

== Bibliography ==
- Snelling, Stephen (2012) [1995]. Gallipoli. VCs of the First World War. The History Press. ISBN 978-0752456539.
