= Raelene Boyle =

Australian sprinter (born 1951)

Raelene Boyle AM MBE
Personal information
- Nationality: Australian
- Born: Raelene Ann Boyle; 24 June 1951 (age 75) Coburg, Victoria, Australia

Sport
- Sport: Running
Medal record
Women's athletics
Representing Australia
Olympic Games
| Silver medal – second place | 1968 Mexico City | 200 metres |
| Silver medal – second place | 1972 Munich | 100 metres |
| Silver medal – second place | 1972 Munich | 200 metres |
Commonwealth Games
| Gold medal – first place | 1970 Edinburgh | 100 metres |
| Gold medal – first place | 1970 Edinburgh | 200 metres |
| Gold medal – first place | 1970 Edinburgh | 4×100m relay |
| Gold medal – first place | 1974 Christchurch | 100 metres |
| Gold medal – first place | 1974 Christchurch | 200 metres |
| Gold medal – first place | 1974 Christchurch | 4×100m relay |
| Gold medal – first place | 1982 Brisbane | 400 metres |
| Silver medal – second place | 1978 Edmonton | 100 metres |
| Silver medal – second place | 1982 Brisbane | 4×400m relay |

Raelene Ann Boyle AM, MBE (born 24 June 1951) is an Australian retired athlete, who represented Australia at three Olympic Games as a sprinter, winning three silver medals, and was named one of 100 National Living Treasures by the National Trust of Australia in 1998. Boyle was diagnosed with breast cancer in 1996 and subsequently became a board member of Breast Cancer Network Australia (BCNA). In 2017, she was named a Legend in the Sport Australia Hall of Fame.

== Early life ==
Boyle was born on 24 June 1951, the daughter of Gilbert and Irene Boyle, in Coburg, a suburb of Melbourne. She was educated at Coburg High School in Melbourne.

== Sporting career ==
After strong performances in the 1968 Australian Championships and Olympic trials, Boyle was selected to represent Australia at the 1968 Summer Olympics in Mexico City, at the age of 16. At 17, she won a silver medal in the 200-metre sprint and placed 4th in the 100 metres. Setting world junior records in both distances, of 22.73 and 11.20 seconds. The 200-metre record lasted 12 years before being broken; the 100-metre 8 years. The 100-metre time stood as an Australian junior record for five and half decades until it was broken in 2025 by Leah O'Brien in Perth. Boyle and O'Brien met after the race and Boyle congratulated her for breaking her 57 year-old record.

Boyle competed in the 1970 British Commonwealth Games in Edinburgh, where she contributed to Australia's number one position on the medal tally with three gold medals, in the 100 and 200-metre sprints and the 4 × 100-metre relay.

At the 1972 Olympics in Munich, Boyle collected two more silver medals, in the 100-metre and 200-metre sprints. In both races, she came second to East German Renate Stecher.

In 1974, at the Christchurch British Commonwealth Games, Boyle duplicated her results at the Edinburgh Games, winning three more gold medals in the same three events. Breaking the games record in both the 100 metres 11.27 and 200 metres with a 22.50 clocking. Later that year in July, Boyle won both the 100 and 200 metres British WAAA Championships titles at the 1974 WAAA Championships.

In January 1976, she and her team-mates beat an eight year old world record for the 4 × 200 metre relay in Brisbane.

At the 1976 Olympics in Montreal, Boyle finished fourth in the final of the 100-metre sprint, but was disqualified from the 200-metre-race for making two false starts. A video replay later showed that she had not false started on her first start. However, Boyle did receive the honour of acting as the flag bearer for the Australian team, the first woman to do so.

Boyle was unable to replicate her previous Commonwealth success at the 1978 Commonwealth Games in Edmonton, placing second in the 100-metre sprint before withdrawing from the 200m and relay due to injury.

Boyle was selected to compete in the 1980 Olympics in Moscow but eventually withdrew from the team for what she stated were personal reasons, during the long dispute within Australian sporting circles over whether to join the USA led boycott of the Games.

Her final major competitive appearance was at the 1982 Commonwealth Games in Brisbane, where she won the 400-metre sprint, and silver in the 4 × 400-metre relay.

Through her successful career, Boyle won seven gold and two silver medals at the Commonwealth Games, in addition to her three silver medals at the Olympic Games.

Many East German athletes were later revealed to have used anabolic steroids within a systematic state-sponsored doping program. Boyle has stated she believes that she would have won at the 1972 Olympics if not for drug use by her competitor. The IOC only banned the use of anabolic steroids in 1975.

== Honours ==
- 15 June 1974 – appointed a Member of the Order of the British Empire (MBE) for services to sport.
- 1974 – awarded the ABC Sportsman of the Year Award
- 1985 – inducted into the Sport Australia Hall of Fame.
- 1991 – received an "award for excellence" in her sport, and for contributions to the Commonwealth Games by the Australian Commonwealth Games Association
- 25 September 1989 – awarded the Douglas Wilkie Medal by the Anti-Football League, for doing the least for football in the best and fairest manner.
- 2000 – Boyle pushed Betty Cuthbert in her wheelchair in the torch relay during the 2000 Sydney Olympics Opening Ceremony.
- 2000 – awarded Australian Sports Medal.
- 2001 – awarded Centenary Medal.
- 2004 – inducted into the Athletics Australia Hall of Fame.
- 2007 – appointed as a Member of the Order of Australia (AM) for service to the community through a range of roles with organisations that support people with cancer, particularly Breast Cancer Network Australia.
- 2013 – named in Australia's Top 100 Sportswomen of All Time.
- 2017 – upgraded to a Sport Australia Hall of Fame Legend.

== Personal life ==
Boyle was diagnosed with cancer in 1996 and ovarian cancer in 2000 and 2001.

Boyle works to raise community awareness about breast cancer and has been a very active board member of Breast Cancer Network Australia (BCNA) since 1999.

Boyle currently lives on the Sunshine Coast in Queensland with her partner Judy Wild.

== See also ==
- List of Olympic medalists in athletics (women)
- Australian athletics champions (Women)
