= Fred McIntosh =

Australian rules footballer

Personal information
- Full name: Frederick Richard McIntosh
- Born: 23 July 1893; Fitzroy, Victoria
- Died: 28 September 1917 (aged 24); Polygon Wood, Passchendaele salient, Belgium
- Original team: Scotch College

Playing career^{1}
Years	Club	Games (Goals)
1913–14	University	25 (4)
1915	Essendon	14 (1)
Total		39 (5)
- ^{1} Playing statistics correct to the end of 1915.

Frederick Richard McIntosh (23 July 1893 – 28 September 1917) was an Australian rules footballer who played with University and Essendon in the Victorian Football League.

== Family ==
The son of Frederick Bury McIntosh (1861–1896), and Pamela Pascoe McIntosh (−1902), née Poole, Frederick Richard McIntosh was born in Fitzroy, Victoria on 23 July 1893.

His father played 36 games in six seasons (1881–1886) for Carlton in the Victorian Football Association (VFA).

== Playing career ==
McIntosh played for University in the Victorian Football League, making his debut in 1913. After 25 games with University he moved to Essendon where he played 14 games in the 1915 VFL season.

== Military service ==
After the outbreak of World War I McIntosh enlisted with the 59th Battalion, 6th Reinforcement of the Australian Imperial Force in July 1915. He left Melbourne on HMAT Nestor on 2 October 1916. On arriving in Europe he saw service at the Western Front. While fighting at Polygon Wood in Belgium he was severely wounded at and died two days later. He was buried at the Lijssenthoek Military Cemetery.

== See also ==
- List of Victorian Football League players who died on active service

== Sources ==
- Holmesby, Russell; Main, Jim (2014). The Encyclopedia of AFL Footballers: every AFL/VFL player since 1897 (10th ed.). Melbourne, Victoria: Bas Publishing. p. 582. ISBN 978-1-921496-32-5.
- Maplestone, M., Flying Higher: History of the Essendon Football Club 1872–1996, Essendon Football Club, (Melbourne), 1996. ISBN 0-9591740-2-8
