= Sun Books =

Australian book publisher

- Status: Inactive
- Founded: 1965
- Founders: Geoffrey Dutton; Max Harris; Brain Stonier
- Country of origin: Australia
- Distribution: Australia
- Publication types: Paperbacks
- Nonfiction topics: Literature; History; Cultural Studies; Politics etc.
- Fiction genres: Literary fiction Poetry

Sun Books was an Australian publisher of paperback books, founded in Melbourne in 1965 by Geoffrey Dutton, Max Harris and Brian Stonier. Sun's three founders were all former employees of Penguin Australia who, having grown frustrated by the latter's tepid interest in home-grown content, had resigned in order to establish the imprint, envisioned as a publisher of “quality paperbacks for the sophisticated Australian reader”, and a platform for local literary talent. Prior to its acquisition by Macmillan in 1981, Sun had published over 330 titles, of which 187 were first editions.

Sun’s non-fiction collection was wide-ranging, encompassing politics, sport, the environment, travel, social justice, gender politics, aboriginal mythology, censorship, and homelessness. However, as evinced by the prominence in the catalogue of parochial satirists and cultural commentators like Donald Horne and Barry Humphries, this diversity was subsumed by a unifying (and self-consciously indigenous) cultural agenda, as summarised by John Arnold in commentary accompanying a 2005 Monash University retrospective:

The Menzies era was coming to an end, and there was a questioning of established values… Sun Books was both a product of, and a contributing player, to the sixties movement to change and reform Australian society.”

Among Sun’s most successful original non-fiction first editions was Geoffrey Blainey’s classic interpretive history of colonial Australia, The Tyranny of Distance first published by Sun in 1966, and still in publication by 2001

Sun’s literary ventures included the acquisition (and subsequent repeated reissue) of Thomas Keneally’s Miles Franklin Award-winning Bring Larks and Heroes, Christina Stead’s House of All Nations, as well as Australian verse, including works by Judith Wright, and the transgressive Drug Poems of Michael Dransfield.

A selection of Sun’s epochal cover designs (including those by Brian Sandgrove, who also adapted the publisher’s colophon from Lawrence Daws’ reproduction of a cave painting of the Wandjina) are preserved and curated online by the Australian Book Designers Association, and in print in Paperback Pioneers: Sun Books 1965–8 by Dominic Hostede.

== Book series ==
- Sun Academy Series
- Sun Books Australian Crime Fiction Series
- Sun Cookery Series
- Sun Poetry Series
- Three Colonial Poets
