= The Sun News-Pictorial =

Daily newspaper in Melbourne, Victoria, Australia (1922–1990)

- Type: Daily newspaper
- Owner: News Limited
- Founded: 11 September 1922
- Ceased publication: 6 October 1990
- Language: English
- City: Melbourne
- Country: Australia
- Sister newspapers: The Herald
- ISSN: 2206-2343

The Sun News-Pictorial (known as The Sun) was a morning daily tabloid newspaper published in Melbourne, Victoria, from 1922 until its merger in 1990 with The Herald to form the Herald-Sun.

The Sun News-Pictorial was part of The Herald and Weekly Times stable of Melbourne newspapers. For more than fifty years it was the newspaper with the largest circulation in Australia. In 1930, more than 650,000 copies were sold each day.

== Character ==
Along with its extensive coverage of Australian rules football (for example, it was responsible for the competition that produced the original VFL/AFL team songs), The Sun News-Pictorial distinguished itself with its photography, columns, and cartoons. Its longest-running column was "A Place in the Sun", originally written by Keith Dunstan, founder of the Anti-Football League, and later Graeme "Jacko" Johnstone. The award-winning cartoonist Jeff Hook became the full-time cartoonist for The Sun News-Pictorial in 1964.

== History ==
=== Origin ===
Keith Murdoch became editor-in-chief of The Herald in January 1921. When the proprietor of the Sydney Sun tried to break into the Melbourne market in 1922 with the launch of The Evening Sun and The Sun News-Pictorial, Murdoch fought a long campaign which eventually resulted in the formation of The Herald and Weekly Times (HWT), with the circulation of The Herald up by 50%, taking over the two tabloids in 1925. Murdoch closed the afternoon rival The Evening Sun. In 1928, Murdoch became managing director of the HWT, by which time The Sun News-Pictorial was on its way to becoming Australia's highest-selling newspaper.

An early editor who has been given much of the credit for the paper's success was Lloyd Dumas.

=== Competition ===
The Sun News-Pictorial's main competitors were the broadsheets The Argus and The Age. The Argus was a morning daily newspaper in Melbourne, published since 1846 and considered to be the general Australian newspaper of record for this period. Widely known as a conservative newspaper for most of its history, it adopted a left-leaning approach in 1949, and after twenty years of financial losses, closed on 19 January 1957.

The other competitor over the life of the newspaper was the more liberal-minded The Age, a daily newspaper that had been published in Melbourne since 1854. David Syme became sole proprietor of the paper in 1891, and he built it up into Victoria's leading newspaper, soon overtaking its rivals The Herald and The Argus.

By 1890 it was selling 100,000 copies a day, making it one of the world's most successful newspapers, but Syme's will prevented the sale of any equity in the paper during his sons' lifetimes, which had the unintended consequence of starving the paper of investment capital for 40 years; The Age was unable to modernise, and gradually lost market share to The Argus and The Sun News-Pictorial, with only its classified advertisement sections keeping the paper profitable.

By the 1940s, the paper's circulation was lower than it had been in 1900, and its political influence had also declined to the extent that while it remained more liberal than the extremely conservative Argus, it lost much of its distinct political identity.

After David Syme's last surviving son, Oswald Syme, took over the paper, he modernised its appearance and standards of news coverage by removing classified advertisements from the front page and introducing photographs long after other papers had done so. In 1948, realising the paper needed outside the capital, Oswald persuaded the courts to overturn his father's will and floated David Syme and Co. as a public company, selling £400,000 worth of shares to enable a badly needed technical upgrade of the newspaper's production.

The Sun News-Pictorial became the highest-circulating daily in Australia, and at times the world, outselling its rivals three to one. One substantial reason for its high level of daily sales was that The Sun News-Pictorial offered a free life-insurance policy to each of those who subscribed for regular daily home delivery of the newspaper (i.e., rather than those who bought it occasionally from street vendors or newsagents), and the insurance policy (valued at somewhere near 12 months' average wages) was current for the duration of that household's subscription.

=== 1990 merger ===
The Sun News-Pictorial ceased publication on 6 October 1990 and merged with sister evening newspaper The Herald to form the Herald-Sun, which contained columns and features from both of its predecessors.

== Notable journalists, columnists, cartoonists and editors ==
- Jeff Hook
- Keith Dunstan
- Pat Jarrett, women's editor from 1946 to 1983 (then a consultant)
- Kitty McEwan, women's sports journalist from 1946-1966.

== See also ==
- List of newspapers in Australia
