= Anti-Football League =

Australian humorous organisation

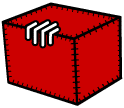
- Founded: 16 April 1967
- Founder: Keith Dunstan
- Dissolved: c. 2012
- Location: Melbourne, Victoria, Australia
- Website: antifootballleague.org/

The Anti-Football League (AFL) was an Australian organisation which poked fun at the obsession with Australian rules football. It was founded by Melbourne journalist Keith Dunstan in 1967.

== Origins ==
The Anti-Football League was created in response to a remark made by journalist Douglas Wilkie in the offices of The Sun News-Pictorial on Sunday, 16 April 1967. On that day, the building was filled with sports writers and ex-footballers – along with their ghost writers – preparing the Monday edition of the football round-up for the weekend. Amongst the relentless discussions pertaining to football, Wilkie, the Sun's foreign correspondent, made a remark to Dunstan that he had had enough. "There must be a better life than this. Couldn't we start an anti-football organisation?"

Dunstan suggested that a badge should be devised so that league members could recognise each other and that intelligent non-football discussion could take place. The badge was to be in the shape of a red cube, symbolic of an object that would not bounce. The firm of K. G. Luke and Company – which was chaired by Sir Kenneth Luke, the president of the Victorian Football League – volunteered to make the badges, and by July 1967, 5,600 of them had been sold.

The Anti-Football League was known unambiguously as the "AFL" when it was established. This became ambiguous in 1990 when the Victorian Football League changed its name to the Australian Football League.

== Wilkie Award ==
The Douglas Wilkie Medal was established as the Anti-Football League's answer to the Brownlow Medal. Wilkie was a former war correspondent and much admired columnist on The Sun, specialising in political and social commentary. Each year the Wilkie Medal honoured the person who has done the least for football in the best and fairest manner. Winners included former prime minister Harold Holt, satirist Barry Humphries (once as himself and once in his Sir Les Patterson comic persona), Olympic champion Raelene Boyle and comedian Wendy Harmer. The award was presented on Anti-Football Day, and the recipient was expected to destroy a football in a unique and creative manner to show their allegiance to the cause. Barry Humphries would later perform in his stage persona of Dame Edna Everage during an AFL Grand Final pre-match, drawing criticism from the organisation for hypocrisy.

== Re-formation ==
The organisation's website was launched in 2006, giving the organisation new impetus. In an article in the Herald Sun newspaper on 12 May 2007, Dunstan is quoted as declaring that "the AFL is back" after a hiatus of 10 years. He cited recent behaviour of the players as a reason to start the league again. Along with the league re-forming, the Douglas Wilkie Medal was awarded for the first time since 1994.

In 2008 the organisation announced the Newman Award to be "presented to a footballer who displays the worst off-field performance, in the preceding 12 months". Sam Newman was among those nominated for the inaugural award. The organisation also held an Anti-Grand Final Day Lunch to celebrate the end of the football season and the return to more civilised pursuits. No mention of football was allowed, with the penalty being eviction from the lunch.

The website stopped being updated in 2012 after the grand final that year; there was an Anti-Grand Final Day Lunch but there is no recorded 2012 Wilkie Medal winner. Dunstan died of cancer in September 2013. The website domain expired at the start of 2021.
