= The Herald and Weekly Times =

Australian newspaper publisher

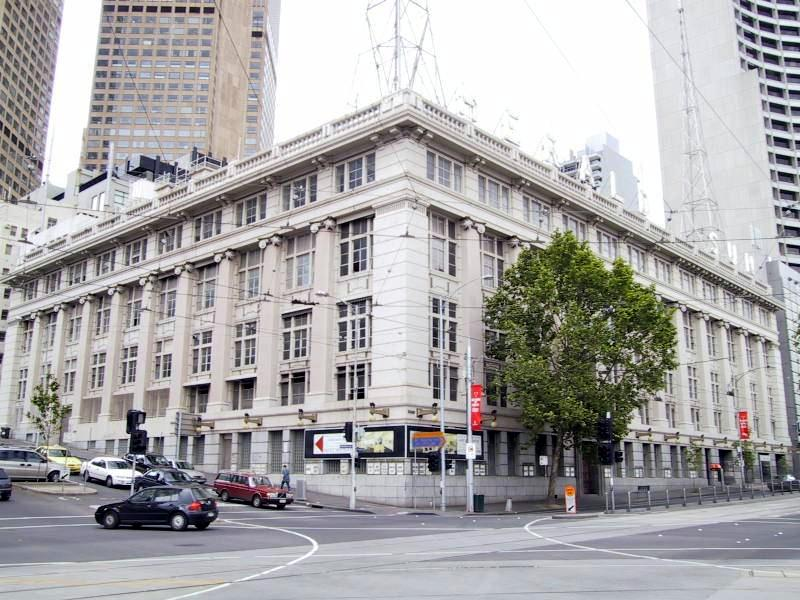
The old Herald and Weekly Times building in Flinders Street, Melbourne.

The Herald and Weekly Times Pty Ltd (HWT) is a newspaper publishing company based in Melbourne, Australia. It is owned and operated by News Pty Ltd, which as News Ltd, purchased the HWT in 1987.

== Newspapers ==
The HWT's newspaper interests date back to 1840 and the launch of The Port Phillip Herald. The company publishes the morning daily tabloid Herald Sun, which was created in 1990 from a merger of the company's morning tabloid paper, The Sun News-Pictorial, with its afternoon broadsheet paper, The Herald. The Herald had a 150-year history, and The Sun News-Pictorial a 68-year history, in Melbourne. The HWT had bought The Sun News-Pictorial in 1925.

The HWT also publishes The Weekly Times, aimed at farmers and rural businesses.

The HWT bought a controlling stake in The Advertiser of Adelaide in 1929. From 1929 until 1987, HWT owned and operated Melbourne radio station 3DB. In 1929, 3DB along with 3UZ participated in experimental television broadcasts using the Radiovision system. The Advertiser took a stake in The News two years later. The News was sold in 1949.

The HWT bought The West Australian in 1969.

By 1986 Queensland Press was the largest shareholder of HWT which was targeted for a takeover by the media tycoon Rupert Murdoch in the course of the big media shake-up of 1986/87, which was enabled by the Australian Federal Government under Prime Minister Bob Hawke to curry favour with the nation's major media and their owners in order to foster its re-election chances in the 1987 Australian federal election. In the end, some major assets of HWT were divided up between Murdoch's rival Robert Holmes à Court. Holmes à Court agreed to drop his $1.4 billion bid for the Melbourne-based Herald and Weekly Times in return for the right to buy its two Perth newspapers, The West Australian and its afternoon counterpart, The Daily News, as well as the Melbourne television station of Channel 7, HSV-7. Murdoch in turn acquired Queensland Press in January 1987 via his family company Cruden Investments for $700 million.

== See also ==
- HSV-7 – owned and operated by the HWT from 1956 to 1986
