= List of Australian athletics champions (women) =

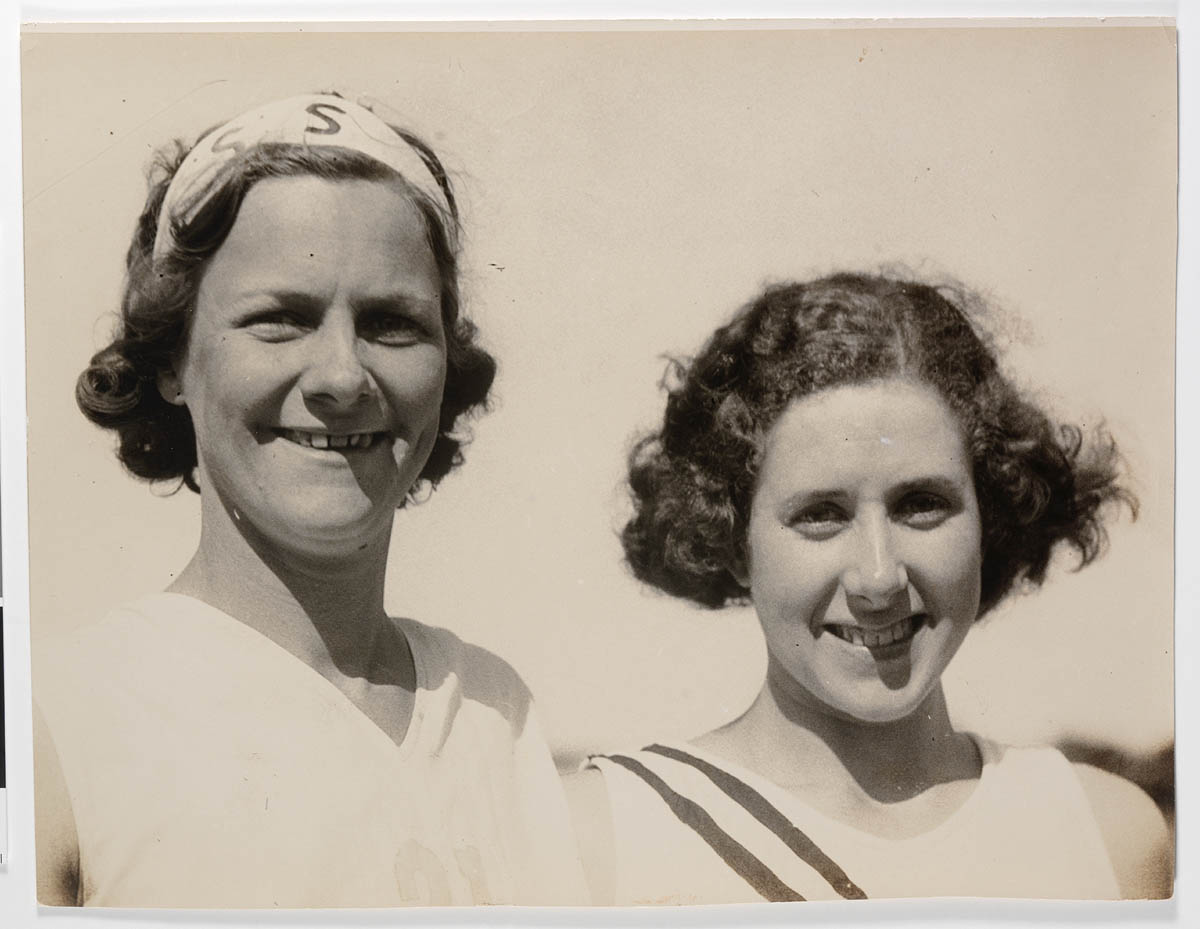
Sprinters Edith Robinson (left) and Eileen Wearne won Australian Championships in the 1930s

Australian Athletics Championships for women have been conducted since 1930.

At the first national championships, only 3 events (100 yards, 80 metres hurdles, and High Jump) were contested, but the programme has since expanded to include the full track and field programme. Until 1963, championships were only held once every two years.

The most successful athlete at the Championships has been thrower Gael Martin who won 20 events in the 1970s and 1980s.

Australia's national champions in athletics are listed below, by event.

== 100 metres ==
Note: 100 yards until 1967

- 1930: Chrissie Dahm
- 1931: Not held
- 1932: Eileen Wearne
- 1933: Emily Brookes
- 1934: Not held
- 1935: Edith Robinson
- 1936: Edith Robinson
- 1937: Decima Norman
- 1938: Not held
- 1939: Not held
- 1940: Lola Forster
- 1941: Not held
- 1942: Not held
- 1943: Not held
- 1944: Not held
- 1945: Not held
- 1946: Not held
- 1947: Not held
- 1948: Joyce King
- 1949: Not held
- 1950: Marjorie Jackson
- 1951: Not held
- 1952: Marjorie Jackson
- 1953: Not held
- 1954: Marjorie Jackson
- 1955: Not held
- 1956: Wendy Hayes
- 1957: Not held
- 1958: Marlene Mathews
- 1959: Not held
- 1960: Pat Duggan
- 1961: Not held
- 1962: Glenys Beasley
- 1963: Dianne Bowering
- 1964: Joyce Bennett
- 1965: Debbie Thompson (USA)
- 1966: Joan Henricksen
- 1967: Dianne Burge

- 1968: Dianne Burge
- 1969: Jenny Lamy
- 1970: Raelene Boyle
- 1971: Raelene Boyle
- 1972: Raelene Boyle
- 1973: Raelene Boyle
- 1974: Denise Boyd
- 1975: Denise Boyd
- 1976: Raelene Boyle
- 1977: Raelene Boyle
- 1978: Debbie Wells
- 1979: Denise Boyd
- 1980: Denise Boyd
- 1981: Debbie Wells
- 1982: Helen Davey
- 1983: Diane Holden
- 1984: Debbie Wells
- 1985: Jenny Flaherty (dead-heat with Diane Holden)
- 1986: Diane Holden
- 1987: Diane Holden
- 1988: Jane Flemming
- 1989: Sue Broadrick
- 1990: Jane Flemming
- 1991: Monique Dunstan
- 1992: Melinda Gainsford
- 1993: Melinda Gainsford
- 1994: Gwen Torrence (USA)
- 1995: Melinda Gainsford
- 1996: Cathy Freeman
- 1997: Melinda Gainsford
- 1998: Melinda Gainsford
- 1999: Lauren Hewitt
- 2000: Melinda Gainsford
- 2001: Lauren Hewitt
- 2002: Lauren Hewitt
- 2003: Sharon Cripps
- 2004: Gloria Kemasuode (NGR)
- 2005: Sally McLellan
- 2006: Sally McLellan
- 2007: Sally McLellan
- 2008: Fiona Cullen
- 2009: Sally McLellan

- 2010: Melissa Breen
- 2011: Sally McLellan
- 2012: Melissa Breen
- 2013: Toea Wisil
- 2014: Sally Pearson
- 2015: Melissa Breen
- 2016: Melissa Breen
- 2017: Toea Wisil
- 2018: Riley Day
- 2019: Naa Anang
- 2020: Not held
- 2021: Hana Basic
- 2022: Zoe Hobbs
- 2023: Torrie Lewis
- 2024: Naa Anang
- 2025: Torrie Lewis

== 200 metres ==
Note: 220 yards until 1967

- 1930: Not held
- 1931: Not held
- 1932: Not held
- 1933: Amy Bremer
- 1934: Not held
- 1935: Edith Robinson
- 1936: Edith Robinson
- 1937: Decima Norman
- 1938: Not held
- 1939: Not held
- 1940: Jean Coleman
- 1941: Not held
- 1942: Not held
- 1943: Not held
- 1944: Not held
- 1945: Not held
- 1946: Not held
- 1947: Not held
- 1948: Joyce King
- 1949: Not held
- 1950: Marjorie Jackson
- 1951: Not held
- 1952: Marjorie Jackson
- 1953: Not held
- 1954: Marjorie Jackson
- 1955: Not held
- 1956: Betty Cuthbert
- 1957: Not held
- 1958: Marlene Mathews
- 1959: Not held
- 1960: Betty Cuthbert
- 1961: Not held
- 1962: Glennys Beasley
- 1963: Joyce Bennett
- 1964: Joyce Bennett
- 1965: Dianne Bowering
- 1966: Joyce Bennett
- 1967: Jenny Lamy
- 1968: Dianne Burge
- 1969: Jenny Lamy

- 1970: Raelene Boyle
- 1971: Raelene Boyle
- 1972: Raelene Boyle
- 1973: Raelene Boyle
- 1974: Denise Boyd
- 1975: Denise Boyd
- 1976: Raelene Boyle
- 1977: Raelene Boyle
- 1978: Denise Boyd
- 1979: Denise Boyd
- 1980: Denise Boyd
- 1981: Debbie Wells
- 1982: Sharon Ruxton
- 1983: Denise Boyd
- 1984: Debbie Wells
- 1985: Maree Holland
- 1986: Diane Holden
- 1987: Diane Holden
- 1988: Kerry Johnson
- 1989: Sue Broadrick
- 1990: Cathy Freeman
- 1991: Cathy Freeman (dead-heat with Esther Paolo)
- 1992: Melinda Gainsford
- 1993: Melinda Gainsford
- 1994: Cathy Freeman
- 1995: Melinda Gainsford
- 1996: Cathy Freeman
- 1997: Melinda Gainsford
- 1998: Melinda Gainsford
- 1999: Lauren Hewitt
- 2000: Cathy Freeman
- 2001: Lauren Hewitt
- 2002: Lauren Hewitt
- 2003: Sharon Cripps
- 2004: Lauren Hewitt
- 2005: Lauren Hewitt
- 2006: Melanie Kleeberg
- 2007: Monique Williams (NZL)
- 2008: Makilesi Batimala (FIJ)
- 2009: Monique Williams (NZL)

- 2010: Jody Henry
- 2011: Sally McLellan
- 2012: Melissa Breen
- 2013: Monica Brennan
- 2014: Ella Nelson
- 2015: Ella Nelson
- 2016: Ella Nelson
- 2017: Toea Wisil
- 2018: Riley Day
- 2019: Zoe Hobbs (NZL)
- 2020: Not held
- 2021: Riley Day
- 2022: Georgia Hulls
- 2023: Torrie Lewis
- 2024: Torrie Lewis
- 2025: Jessica Milat

== 400 metres ==
Note: 440 yards until 1967

- 1930: Not held
- 1931: Not held
- 1932: Not held
- 1933: Not held
- 1934: Not held
- 1935: Not held
- 1936: Not held
- 1937: Jean Coleman
- 1938: Not held
- 1939: Not held
- 1940: Irene Talbot
- 1941: Not held
- 1942: Not held
- 1943: Not held
- 1944: Not held
- 1945: Not held
- 1946: Not held
- 1947: Not held
- 1948: Shirley McConnachie
- 1949: Not held
- 1950: Shirley Strickland
- 1951: Not held
- 1952: Shirley Strickland
- 1953: Not held
- 1954: Pam Bryant
- 1955: Not held
- 1956: Shirley Strickland
- 1957: Not held
- 1958: Brenda Jones
- 1959: Not held
- 1960: Dixie Willis
- 1961: Not held
- 1962: Dixie Willis
- 1963: Betty Cuthbert
- 1964: Dixie Willis
- 1965: Judy Pollock
- 1966: Judy Pollock
- 1967: Judy Pollock
- 1968: Sandra Brown
- 1969: Elaine Frawley

- 1970: Sandra Brown
- 1971: Cheryl Peasley
- 1972: Judy Pollock
- 1973: Charlene Rendina
- 1974: Marg Sargant
- 1975: Charlene Rendina
- 1976: Bethanie Nail
- 1977: Marian Fisher
- 1978: Maxine Corcoran
- 1979: Maxine Corcoran
- 1980: Raelene Boyle
- 1981: Terri Cater
- 1982: Raelene Boyle
- 1983: Denise Boyd
- 1984: Kim Robertson (NZL)
- 1985: Debbie Flintoff-King
- 1986: Debbie Flintoff-King
- 1987: Sally Fleming
- 1988: Maree Holland
- 1989: Maree Holland
- 1990: Sharon Stewart
- 1991: Renee Poetschka
- 1992: Sharon Stewart
- 1993: Renee Poetschka
- 1994: Renee Poetschka
- 1995: Cathy Freeman
- 1996: Renee Poetschka
- 1997: Cathy Freeman
- 1998: Cathy Freeman
- 1999: Cathy Freeman
- 2000: Cathy Freeman
- 2001: Nova Peris
- 2002: Catherine Murphy (GBR)
- 2003: Cathy Freeman
- 2004: Annabelle Smith
- 2005: Tamsyn Manou
- 2006: Jane Arnott (NZL)
- 2007: Tamsyn Manou
- 2008: Tamsyn Manou
- 2009: Tamsyn Manou

- 2010: Joanne Cuddihy (IRL)
- 2011: Tamsyn Manou
- 2012: Joanne Cuddihy (IRL)
- 2013: Caitlin Sargent-Jones
- 2014: Morgan Mitchell
- 2015: Anneliese Rubie
- 2016: Morgan Mitchell
- 2017: Morgan Mitchell
- 2018: Anneliese Rubie
- 2019: Bendere Oboya
- 2020: Not held
- 2021: Bendere Oboya
- 2022: Isabel Neal
- 2023: Jessie Andrew
- 2024: Ellie Beer
- 2025: Ellie Beer

== 800 metres ==
Note: 880 yards until 1967

- 1930: Not held
- 1931: Not held
- 1932: Not held
- 1933: Not held
- 1934: Not held
- 1935: Not held
- 1936: Not held
- 1937: Audrey Bradfield
- 1938: Not held
- 1939: Not held
- 1940: Betty Judge
- 1941: Not held
- 1942: Not held
- 1943: Not held
- 1944: Not held
- 1945: Not held
- 1946: Not held
- 1947: Not held
- 1948: Kit Mears
- 1949: Not held
- 1950: Mavis Monaghan
- 1951: Not held
- 1952: Stella Massey
- 1953: Not held
- 1954: Beris Folland
- 1955: Not held
- 1956: Joyce Hanger
- 1957: Not held
- 1958: Brenda Jones
- 1959: Not held
- 1960: Dixie Willis
- 1961: Not held
- 1962: Dixie Willis
- 1963: Dixie Willis
- 1964: Dixie Willis
- 1965: Judy Pollock
- 1966: Judy Pollock
- 1967: Judy Pollock
- 1968: Sandra Brown
- 1969: Cheryl Peasley

- 1970: Cheryl Peasley
- 1971: Cheryl Peasley
- 1972: Judy Pollock
- 1973: Charlene Rendina
- 1974: Charlene Rendina
- 1975: Charlene Rendina
- 1976: Charlene Rendina
- 1977: Penny Gray
- 1978: Julie Schwass
- 1979: Charlene Rendina
- 1980: Terri Cater
- 1981: Terri Cater
- 1982: Heather Barralet
- 1983: Heather Barralet
- 1984: Heather Barralet
- 1985: Bronwyn Fleming
- 1986: Wendy Old
- 1987: Sarah Collins
- 1988: Sharon Stewart
- 1989: Sharon Stewart
- 1990: Wendy Old
- 1991: Sharon Stewart
- 1992: Jodie Nykvist-Hebbard
- 1993: Narelle Parr
- 1994: Sandy Dawson
- 1995: Sandy Dawson
- 1996: Lisa Lightfoot
- 1997: Saleena Roberts
- 1998: Tamsyn Manou
- 1999: Tamsyn Manou
- 2000: Tamsyn Manou
- 2001: Tamsyn Manou
- 2002: Tamsyn Manou
- 2003: Tamsyn Manou
- 2004: Rikke Ronholt (DEN)
- 2005: Katherine Katsanavakis
- 2006: Suzy Walsham
- 2007: Tamsyn Manou
- 2008: Tamsyn Manou
- 2009: Madeleine Pape

- 2010: Katherine Katsanavakis
- 2011: Tamsyn Manou
- 2012: Tamsyn Manou
- 2013: Kelly Hetherington
- 2014: Brittany McGowan
- 2015: Brittany McGowan
- 2016: Brittany McGowan
- 2017: Lora Storey
- 2018: Brittany McGowan
- 2019: Catriona Bisset
- 2020: Not held
- 2021: Catriona Bisset
- 2022: Catriona Bisset
- 2023: Catriona Bisset
- 2024: Claudia Hollingsworth
- 2025: Abbey Caldwell

== 1500 metres ==
Note: One mile until 1967

- 1960: Not held
- 1961: Not held
- 1962: Not held
- 1963: Not held
- 1964: Not held
- 1965: Beth Stanford
- 1966: Beth Stanford
- 1967: Margaret Clifford
- 1968: Brenda Carr
- 1969: Cheryl Peasley
- 1970: Raie Thompson
- 1971: Jenny Orr
- 1972: Jenny Orr
- 1973: Jenny Orr
- 1974: Jenny Orr
- 1975: Angela Cook
- 1976: Judy Pollock
- 1977: Angela Cook
- 1978: Alison Wrench
- 1979: Penny Gray
- 1980: Sue Muir
- 1981: Margaret Reddish
- 1982: Sharon Dalton
- 1983: Linda Gray (NZL)
- 1984: Anne McKenzie (NZL)
- 1985: Geng Ziunuan (CHN)
- 1986: Penny Just
- 1987: Jackie Perkins
- 1988: Marg Leaney
- 1989: Liz Miller
- 1990: Wendy Old
- 1991: Suzy Walsham
- 1992: Jodie Nykvist-Hebbard
- 1993: Susie Power
- 1994: Marg Leaney
- 1995: Sonia O'Sullivan (IRE)
- 1996: Marg Crowley
- 1997: Mandy Giblin
- 1998: Liz Miller
- 1999: Sarah Jamieson

- 2000: Naomi Mugo (KEN)
- 2001: Suzy Walsham
- 2002: Georgie Clarke
- 2003: Suzy Walsham
- 2004: Sarah Jamieson
- 2005: Sarah Jamieson
- 2006: Sarah Jamieson
- 2007: Lisa Corrigan
- 2008: Veronique Molan
- 2009: Sarah Jamieson
- 2010: Kaila McKnight
- 2011: Zoe Buckman
- 2012: Kaila McKnight
- 2013: Zoe Buckman
- 2014: Zoe Buckman
- 2015: Heidi See
- 2016: Heidi See
- 2017: Heidi See
- 2018: Linden Hall
- 2019: Chloe Tighe
- 2020: Not held
- 2021: Linden Hall
- 2022: Abbey Caldwell
- 2023: Jessica Hull
- 2024: Jessica Hull
- 2025: Jessica Hull

== 3000 metres ==
- 1970: Not held
- 1971: Not held
- 1972: Not held
- 1973: Not held
- 1974: Jenny Orr
- 1975: Angela Cook
- 1976: Irene Cooke
- 1977: Phyllis Lazarakis
- 1978: Phyllis Lazarakis
- 1979: Rhonda Taylor
- 1980: Sue Muir
- 1981: Jenny Lund
- 1982: Megan Sloane
- 1983: Anne Lord
- 1984: Donna Gould
- 1985: Jackie Perkins
- 1986: Jackie Perkins
- 1987: Jackie Perkins
- 1988: Jackie Perkins
- 1989: Ann Hare (NZL)
- 1990: Krishna Stanton
- 1991: Jenny Lund
- 1992: Rhona Makepeace
- 1993: Krishna Stanton
- 1994: Liz Miller
- 1995: Not held
- 1996: Not held
- 1997: Not held
- 1998: Not held
- 1999: Not held
- 2000: Not held
- 2001: Not held
- 2002: Not held
- 2003: Anna Thompson
- 2004: Not held
- 2005: Not held
- 2006: Not held
- 2007: Lauren Fleshman (USA)
- 2008: Chloe Tighe
- 2009: Melanie Daniels

- 2010: Not held
- 2011: Not held
- 2012: Not held
- 2013: Not held
- 2014: Not held
- 2015: Bridey Delaney
- 2016: Not held
- 2017: Not held
- 2018: Not held
- 2019: Not held
- 2020: Not held
- 2021: Genevieve Gregson
- 2022: Rose Davies

== 5000 metres ==
- 1995: Carolyn Schuwalow
- 1996: Kate Anderson
- 1997: Kate Anderson
- 1998: Anne Cross
- 1999: Natalie Harvey
- 2000: Anne Cross
- 2001: Elizabeth Miller
- 2002: Hayley McGregor
- 2003: Benita Johnson
- 2004: Georgie Clarke
- 2005: Benita Johnson
- 2006: Eloise Wellings
- 2007: Benita Johnson
- 2008: Georgie Clarke
- 2009: Sarah Jamieson
- 2010: Eloise Wellings
- 2011: Belinda Martin
- 2012: Kaila McKnight
- 2013: Kaila McKnight
- 2014: Emily Brichacek
- 2015: Magdalene Masai (KEN)
- 2016: Genevieve Lacaze
- 2017: Heidi See
- 2018: Celia Sullohern
- 2019: Melissa Duncan
- 2020: Jessica Hull
- 2021: Andrea Seccafien (CAN)
- 2022: Jessica Hull
- 2023: Jessica Hull
- 2024: Rose Davies
- 2025: Jessica Hull

== 10,000 metres ==
- 1980: Not held
- 1981: Not held
- 1982: Not held
- 1983: Maureen Moyle
- 1984: Sally Pearson
- 1985: Mary O'Connor (NZL)
- 1986: Tania Turney
- 1987: Jackie Perkins
- 1988: Carolyn Schuwalow
- 1989: Coral Farr
- 1990: Sue Mahony
- 1991: Jenny Lund
- 1992: Sue Hobson
- 1993: Sue Hobson
- 1994: Sue Hobson
- 1995: Lisa Martin
- 1996: Not held
- 1997: Kylie Risk
- 1998: Natalie Harvey
- 1999: Natalie Harvey
- 2000: Sonia O'Sullivan (IRE)
- 2001: Sonia O'Sullivan (IRE)
- 2002: Kerryn McCann
- 2003: Anna Thompson
- 2004: Benita Johnson
- 2005: Hayley McGregor
- 2006: Benita Johnson
- 2007: Jessica Ruthe (NZL)
- 2008: Melinda Vernon
- 2009: Lara Tamsett
- 2010: Eloise Wellings
- 2011: Eloise Wellings
- 2012: Joyce Chepkirui (KEN)
- 2013: Neely Spence Gracey (USA)
- 2014: Nikki Chapple
- 2015: Veronica Wanjiru (KEN)
- 2016: Eloise Wellings
- 2017: Camille Buscomb (NZL)
- 2018: Celia Sullohern
- 2019: Hitomi Niiya (JPN)

- 2020: Genevieve Gregson
- 2021: Rose Davies
- 2022: Rose Davies
- 2024: Lauren Ryan
- 2025: Rose Davies

== 100 metres hurdles ==
Note: 90 yards or 80 metres hurdles until 1967

- 1930: Clarice Kennedy
- 1931: Not held
- 1932: Jean Manson
- 1933: Clarice Kennedy
- 1934: Not held
- 1935: Clarice Kennedy
- 1936: Clarice Kennedy
- 1937: Isabel Grant
- 1938: Not held
- 1939: Not held
- 1940: Decima Norman
- 1941: Not held
- 1942: Not held
- 1943: Not held
- 1944: Not held
- 1945: Not held
- 1946: Not held
- 1947: Not held
- 1948: Shirley Strickland
- 1949: Not held
- 1950: Shirley Strickland
- 1951: Not held
- 1952: Shirley Strickland
- 1953: Not held
- 1954: Gwen Wallace
- 1955: Not held
- 1956: Norma Austin
- 1957: Not held
- 1958: Norma Thrower
- 1959: Not held
- 1960: Norma Thrower
- 1961: Not held
- 1962: Jackie Dufall
- 1963: Pam Kilborn
- 1964: Pam Kilborn
- 1965: Pam Kilborn
- 1966: Pam Kilborn
- 1967: Pam Kilborn
- 1968: Pam Kilborn
- 1969: Pam Kilborn

- 1970: Maureen Caird
- 1971: Diane Pease
- 1972: Penny Gillies
- 1973: Gaye Dell
- 1974: Gaye Dell
- 1975: Gaye Dell
- 1976: Gaye Dell
- 1977: Penny Gillies
- 1978: Cheryl Boswell
- 1979: Penny Gillies
- 1980: Penny Gillies
- 1981: Penny Gillies
- 1982: Glynis Nunn
- 1983: Glynis Nunn
- 1984: Glynis Nunn
- 1985: Glynis Nunn
- 1986: Glynis Nunn
- 1987: Jenny Laurendet
- 1988: Jane Flemming
- 1989: Helen Pirovano (NZL)
- 1990: Jenny Laurendet
- 1991: Jayne Moyes
- 1992: Jayne Moyes
- 1993: Jane Flemming
- 1994: Jane Flemming
- 1995: Jane Flemming
- 1996: Sam Farquharson (GBR)
- 1997: Jane Flemming
- 1998: Debbi Edwards
- 1999: Eunice Barber (FRA)
- 2000: Valerie Manning (USA)
- 2001: Jacqui Munro
- 2002: Jacqui Munro
- 2003: Jacqui Munro
- 2004: Jacqui Munro
- 2005: Sally Pearson (dead-heat with Fiona Cullen)
- 2006: Sally Pearson
- 2007: Sally Pearson
- 2008: Andrea Miller (NZL)
- 2009: Sally Pearson

- 2010: Hayley Butler
- 2011: Sally Pearson
- 2012: Shannon McCann
- 2013: Shannon McCann
- 2014: Sally Pearson
- 2015: Sally Pearson
- 2016: Michelle Jenneke
- 2017: Sally Pearson
- 2018: Sally Pearson
- 2019: Celeste Mucci
- 2020: Not held
- 2021: Elizabeth Clay
- 2022: Elizabeth Clay
- 2023: Michelle Jenneke
- 2024: Michelle Jenneke
- 2025: Elizabeth Clay

== 200 metres hurdles ==
- 1968: Not held
- 1969: Not held
- 1970: Maureen Caird
- 1971: Maureen Caird
- 1972: Pam Ryan
- 1973: Gaye Dell
- 1974: Gaye Dell
- 1975: Gaye Dell

== 400 metres hurdles ==
- 1970: Not held
- 1971: Not held
- 1972: Not held
- 1973: Not held
- 1974: Not held
- 1975: Lyn Young
- 1976: Marian Fisher
- 1977: Marian Fisher
- 1978: Marian Fisher
- 1979: Lyn Foreman
- 1980: Lyn Foreman
- 1981: Lyn Foreman
- 1982: Lyn Foreman
- 1983: Debbie Flintoff
- 1984: Debbie Flintoff
- 1985: Debbie Flintoff
- 1986: Debbie Flintoff-King
- 1987: Sally Flemming
- 1988: Debbie Flintoff-King
- 1989: Helen Graham
- 1990: Jenny Laurendet
- 1991: Debbie Flintoff-King
- 1992: Gail Millar-Luke
- 1993: Renee Poetschka
- 1994: Lauren Poetschka
- 1995: Jacqueline Parker (GBR)
- 1996: Rebecca Campbell
- 1997: Evette Cordy
- 1998: Stephanie Price
- 1999: Lauren Poetschka
- 2000: Lauren Poetschka
- 2001: Jana Pittman
- 2002: Jana Pittman
- 2003: Jana Pittman
- 2004: Rebecca Wardell
- 2005: Lauren Wells
- 2006: Sonia Brito
- 2007: Lauren Wells
- 2008: Lauren Wells
- 2009: Tamsyn Lewis

- 2010: Lauren Wells
- 2011: Lauren Wells
- 2012: Jess Gulli
- 2013: Lauren Wells
- 2014: Lauren Wells
- 2015: Lauren Wells
- 2016: Lauren Wells
- 2017: Lauren Wells
- 2018: Lauren Wells
- 2019: Lauren Wells
- 2020: Not held
- 2021: Lauren Wells
- 2022: Sarah Carli
- 2023: Sarah Carli
- 2024: Sarah Carli
- 2025: Sarah Carli

== 3000 metres steeplechase ==
- 1999: Melissa Rollison
- 2000: Melissa Rollison
- 2001: Rachel Penney (NZL)
- 2002: Melissa Rollison
- 2003: Victoria Mitchell
- 2004: Marnie Ponton
- 2005: Kristy Villis
- 2006: Melissa Rollison
- 2007: Donna MacFarlane
- 2008: Donna MacFarlane
- 2009: Donna MacFarlane
- 2010: Melissa Rollison
- 2011: Victoria Mitchell
- 2012: Milly Clark
- 2013: Genevieve Gregson
- 2014: Victoria Mitchell
- 2015: Genevieve Gregson
- 2016: Madeline Hills
- 2017: Victoria Mitchell
- 2018: Victoria Mitchell
- 2019: Paige Campbell
- 2020: Not held
- 2021: Genevieve Gregson
- 2021: Rose Davies
- 2022: Amy Cashin
- 2023: Cara Feain-Ryan
- 2024: Amy Cashin
- 2025: Cara Feain-Ryan

== Marathon ==
- 1980: Jane Kuchins
- 1981: Rosemary Longstaff
- 1982: Barbara McKerrow (NZL)
- 1983: Annick Loir-Lebreton (FRA)
- 1984: Ngaire Drake (NZL)
- 1985: Ngaire Drake (NZL)
- 1986: Ngaire Drake (NZL)
- 1987: Tani Ruckle
- 1988: Ngaire Drake (NZL)
- 1989: Jan Fedrick
- 1990: Hiromi Satoyama (JPN)
- 1991: Jackie Hallam
- 1992: Mari Tanigawa (JPN)
- 1993: Eriko Asai (JPN)
- 1994: Joanne Cowan
- 1995: Julie Rose
- 1996: Sylvia Rose
- 1997: Susan Hobson
- 1998: Lisa Dick
- 1999: Carolyn Schuwalow
- 2000: Krishna Stanton
- 2001: Krishna Stanton
- 2002: Heather Turland
- 2003: Helen Verity-Tolhurst
- 2004: Jenny Wickham
- 2005: Jackie Fairweather
- 2006: Jennifer Gillard
- 2007: Eliza Mayger
- 2008: Lisa Flint
- 2009: Lisa Flint
- 2010: Roxie Fraser
- 2011: Kirsten Molloy
- 2012: Lauren Shelley
- 2013: Sharon Ryder
- 2014: Tarli Bird
- 2015: Kelly-Ann Varey
- 2016: Virginia Moloney
- 2017: Makda Harun
- 2018: Kerri Hodge
- 2019: Ingrid Cleland

== 10 kilometre road walk ==
- 1982: Not held
- 1983: Sue Cook
- 1984: Sally Pierson
- 1985: Kerry Saxby
- 1986: Kerry Saxby
- 1987: Kerry Saxby
- 1988: Kerry Saxby
- 1989: Miriam Harding
- 1990: Kerry Saxby-Junna
- 1991: Jane Saville
- 1992: Jane Saville
- 1993: Kerry Saxby-Junna
- 1994: Kerry Saxby-Junna
- 1995: Kerry Saxby-Junna
- 1996: Kerry Saxby-Junna
- 1997: Jane Saville
- 1998: Jane Saville
- 1999: Kerry Saxby-Junna
- 2000: Lisa Paolini
- 2001: Lyn Ventris
- 2002: Claire Woods
- 2003: Simone Wolowiec
- 2004: Claire Woods
- 2005: Simon Wolowiec
- 2006: Natalie Saville
- 2007: Megan Szirom
- 2008: Not held
- 2009: Not held
- 2023: Olivia Sandery
- 2024: Jemima Montag
- 2025: Allanah Pitcher

== 20 kilometre road walk ==
- 1980: Not held
- 1981: Not held
- 1982: Not held
- 1983: Sally Pierson
- 1984: Kerry Saxby
- 1985: Kerry Saxby
- 1986: Kerry Saxby
- 1987: Kerry Saxby
- 1988: Bev Hayman
- 1989: Kerry Saxby-Junna
- 1990: Sue Cook
- 1991: Sharon Schnyder
- 1992: Gabriele Blythe
- 1993: Anne Manning
- 1994: Anne Manning
- 1995: Anne Manning
- 1996: Simone Wolowiec
- 1997: Jill Maybir-Barrett
- 1998: Wendy Muldoon
- 1999: Not held
- 2000: Erica Alfredi (ITA)
- 2001: Kerry Saxby-Junna
- 2002: Jane Saville
- 2003: Jane Saville
- 2004: Jane Saville
- 2005: Jane Saville
- 2006: Jane Saville
- 2007: Claire Tallent
- 2008: Johanna Jackson (GBR)
- 2009: Cheryl Webb
- 2010: Claire Tallent
- 2011: Claire Tallent
- 2012: Claire Tallent
- 2013: Tanya Holliday
- 2014: Kelly Ruddick
- 2015: Tanya Holliday
- 2016: Rachel Tallent
- 2017: Regan Lamble

== Pole vault ==
- 1995: Emma George
- 1996: Melissa Harris
- 1997: Emma George
- 1998: Emma George
- 1999: Tatiana Grigorieva
- 2000: Emma George
- 2001: Jenni Dryburgh (NZL)
- 2002: Tatiana Grigorieva
- 2003: Melina Hamilton (NZL)
- 2004: Kym Howe
- 2005: Melina Hamilton (NZL)
- 2006: Tatiana Grigorieva
- 2007: Kym Howe
- 2008: Alana Boyd
- 2009: Alana Boyd
- 2010: Elizabeth Parnov
- 2011: Charmaine Lucock
- 2012: Vicky Parnov
- 2013: Alana Boyd
- 2014: Elizabeth Parnov
- 2015: Alana Boyd
- 2016: Elizabeth Parnov
- 2017: Eliza McCartney (NZL)
- 2018: Nina Kennedy
- 2019: Olivia McTaggart (NZL)
- 2020: Not held
- 2021: Nina Kennedy
- 2022: Nina Kennedy

== High jump ==
- 1930: Rosa Winter
- 1931: Not held
- 1932: Doris Carter
- 1933: Doris Carter
- 1934: Not held
- 1935: Doris Carter
- 1936: Doris Carter
- 1937: Doris Carter
- 1938: Not held
- 1939: Not held
- 1940: Doris Carter
- 1941: Not held
- 1942: Not held
- 1943: Not held
- 1944: Not held
- 1945: Not held
- 1946: Not held
- 1947: Not held
- 1948: Coral Stewart
- 1949: Not held
- 1950: Jacqueline Baumann
- 1951: Not held
- 1952: Mary Grace
- 1953: Not held
- 1954: Carol Bernoth
- 1955: Not held
- 1956: Jan Cooper
- 1957: Not held
- 1958: Michele Mason
- 1959: Not held
- 1960: Helen Frith
- 1961: Not held
- 1962: Carolyn Wright
- 1963: Robyn Woodhouse
- 1964: Michele Brown
- 1965: Robyn Woodhouse
- 1966: Michele Brown
- 1967: Robyn Woodhouse
- 1968: Carolyn Wright
- 1969: Carolyn Wright

- 1970: Carolyn Wright
- 1971: Carolyn Wright
- 1972: Raylene Parke
- 1973: Carolyn Lewis
- 1974: Raylene Parke
- 1975: Raylene Parke
- 1976: Christine Annison
- 1977: Christine Annison
- 1978: Katrina Gibbs
- 1979: Vanessa Browne
- 1980: Christine Stanton
- 1981: Christine Stanton
- 1982: Katrina Gibbs
- 1983: Christine Stanton
- 1984: Vanessa Browne
- 1985: Christine Stanton
- 1986: Christine Stanton
- 1987: Christine Stanton
- 1988: Vanessa Browne
- 1989: Vanessa Ward
- 1990: Vanessa Ward
- 1991: Alison Inverarity
- 1992: Tania Murray (NZL)
- 1993: Alison Inverarity
- 1994: Alison Inverarity
- 1995: Alison Inverarity
- 1996: Lea Haggett (GBR)
- 1997: Alison Inverarity
- 1998: Alison Inverarity
- 1999: Alison Inverarity
- 2000: Alison Inverarity
- 2001: Carmen Hunter
- 2002: Petrina Price
- 2003: Miyuki Aoyama (JPN)
- 2004: Petrina Price
- 2005: Sophia Begg
- 2006: Ellen Pettitt
- 2007: Ellen Pettitt
- 2008: Catherine Drummond
- 2009: Petrina Price

- 2010: Petrina Price
- 2011: Ellen Pettitt
- 2012: Miyuki Fukumoto (JPN)
- 2013: Miyuki Fukumoto (JPN)
- 2014: Eleanor Patterson
- 2015: Eleanor Patterson
- 2016: Eleanor Patterson
- 2017: Eleanor Patterson
- 2018: Cassie Purdon
- 2019: Nicola McDermott
- 2020: Not held
- 2021: Nicola McDermott
- 2022: Nicola Olyslagers
- 2023: Nicola Olyslagers
- 2024: Nicola Olyslagers
- 2025: Nicola Olyslagers

== Long jump ==
- 1930: Not held
- 1931: Not held
- 1932: Not held
- 1933: Connie Hudson
- 1934: Not held
- 1935: Thelma Peake
- 1936: Thelma Peake
- 1937: Thelma Peake
- 1938: Not held
- 1939: Not held
- 1940: Decima Norman
- 1941: Not held
- 1942: Not held
- 1943: Not held
- 1944: Not held
- 1945: Not held
- 1946: Not held
- 1947: Not held
- 1948: Judy Canty
- 1949: Not held
- 1950: Judy Canty
- 1951: Not held
- 1952: Verna Johnston
- 1953: Not held
- 1954: Valerie Schwarzinger
- 1955: Not held
- 1956: Erica Willis
- 1957: Not held
- 1958: Beverley Watson
- 1959: Not held
- 1960: Sylvia Mitchell
- 1961: Not held
- 1962: Pam Kilborn
- 1963: Pam Kilborn
- 1964: Helen Frith
- 1965: Willye White (USA)
- 1966: Helen Frith
- 1967: Pam Kilborn
- 1968: Lenore Liscombe
- 1969: Diane Pease

- 1970: Diane Pease
- 1971: Diane Pease
- 1972: Lyn Tillett
- 1973: Erica Nixon
- 1974: Erica Nixon
- 1975: Erica Nixon
- 1976: Erica Nixon
- 1977: Lyn Jacenko
- 1978: Lyn Jacenko
- 1979: Lyn Jacenko
- 1980: Linda Garden
- 1981: Chris Stanton
- 1982: Linda Garden
- 1983: Robyn Strong
- 1984: Robyn Strong
- 1985: Linda Garden
- 1986: Robyn Lorraway
- 1987: Nicole Boegman
- 1988: Nicole Boegman
- 1989: Jayne Moffitt (NZL)
- 1990: Peta Kennedy
- 1991: Jayne Moffitt (NZL)
- 1992: Nicole Boegman
- 1993: Nicole Boegman
- 1994: Nicole Boegman
- 1995: Nicole Boegman
- 1996: Chantal Brunner (NZL)
- 1997: Chantal Brunner (NZL)
- 1998: Nicole Boegman
- 1999: Eunice Barber (FRA)
- 2000: Kylie Reed
- 2001: Chantal Brunner (NZL)
- 2002: Bronwyn Thompson
- 2003: Bronwyn Thompson
- 2004: Kerrie Taurima
- 2005: Kerrie Taurima
- 2006: Bronwyn Thompson
- 2007: Bronwyn Thompson
- 2008: Bronwyn Thompson
- 2009: Jacinta Boyd

- 2010: Jessica Penney
- 2011: Kerrie Perkins
- 2012: Kerrie Perkins
- 2013: Kerrie Perkins
- 2014: Brooke Stratton
- 2015: Chelsea Jaensch
- 2016: Brooke Stratton
- 2017: Naa Anang
- 2018: Brooke Stratton
- 2019: Naa Anang
- 2020: Not held
- 2021: Brooke Stratton
- 2022: Samantha Dale

== Triple jump ==
- 1986: Anne Turnbull
- 1987: Lynette Smith
- 1988: Lynette Smith
- 1989: Karen Charlton
- 1990: Karen Charlton
- 1991: Jayne Moffitt (NZL)
- 1992: Leanne Stapylton-Smith (NZL)
- 1993: Nicole Boegman
- 1994: Yoko Morioka (JPN)
- 1995: Mariklud Viduka
- 1996: Shelley Stoddart (NZL)
- 1997: Tania Dixon (NZL)
- 1998: Connie Henry (GBR)
- 1999: Carmen Miller
- 2000: Nicole Mladenis
- 2001: Nicole Mladenis
- 2002: Nicole Mladenis
- 2003: Jeanette Bowles
- 2004: Nicole Mladenis
- 2005: Jeanette Bowles
- 2006: Linda Allen
- 2007: Jeanette Bowles
- 2008: Emma Knight
- 2009: Linda Allen
- 2010: Meggan O'Riley
- 2011: Emma Knight
- 2012: Ellen Pettitt
- 2013: Linda Leverton
- 2014: Linda Leverton
- 2015: Nneka Okpala (NZL)
- 2016: Nneka Okpala (NZL)
- 2017: Meggan O'Riley
- 2018: Meggan O'Riley
- 2019: Ellen Pettitt
- 2020: Not held
- 2021: Aliyah Parker
- 2022: Roksana Khudoyarova (UZB)

== Shot put ==
- 1930: Not held
- 1931: Not held
- 1932: Not held
- 1933: Cora Hannan
- 1934: Not held
- 1935: Vera Cowan
- 1936: Vera Cowan
- 1937: Vera Cowan
- 1938: Not held
- 1939: Not held
- 1940: Cora Hannan
- 1941: Not held
- 1942: Not held
- 1943: Not held
- 1944: Not held
- 1945: Not held
- 1946: Not held
- 1947: Not held
- 1948: Pat Lucas
- 1949: Not held
- 1950: Ann Shanley
- 1951: Not held
- 1952: Val Lawrence
- 1953: Not held
- 1954: Val Lawrence
- 1955: Not held
- 1956: Mary Breen
- 1957: Not held
- 1958: Margaret Woodlock
- 1959: Not held
- 1960: Margaret Woodlock
- 1961: Not held
- 1962: Mary Breen
- 1963: Jean Roberts
- 1964: Jean Roberts
- 1965: Jean Roberts
- 1966: Jean Roberts
- 1967: Jean Roberts
- 1968: Jean Roberts
- 1969: Jean Roberts

- 1970: Jean Roberts
- 1971: Anne Karner
- 1972: Anne Karner
- 1973: Christine Schultz
- 1974: Anne Karner
- 1975: Anne Karner
- 1976: Gael Mulhall
- 1977: Gael Mulhall
- 1978: Gael Mulhall
- 1979: Gael Mulhall
- 1980: Gael Mulhall
- 1981: Gael Mulhall
- 1982: Bev Francis
- 1983: Gael Mulhall
- 1984: Gael Martin
- 1985: Gael Martin
- 1986: Gael Martin
- 1987: Gael Martin
- 1988: Astra Vitols
- 1989: Astra Vitols
- 1990: Nicole Carkeek
- 1991: Daniela Costian
- 1992: Christine King (NZL)
- 1993: Daniela Costian
- 1994: Daniela Costian
- 1995: Lisa-Marie Vizaniari
- 1996: Georgette Reed (CAN)
- 1997: Beatrice Faumuina (NZL)
- 1998: Beatrice Faumuina (NZL)
- 1999: Tressa Thompson (USA)
- 2000: Helen Toussis
- 2001: Yoko Toyonaga (JPN)
- 2002: Michelle Haage
- 2003: Sumi Ichioka (JPN)
- 2004: Valerie Adams (NZL)
- 2005: Valerie Adams (NZL)
- 2006: Ana Pouhila (TGA)
- 2007: Ana Pouhila (TGA)
- 2008: Valerie Adams (NZL)
- 2009: Valerie Adams (NZL)

- 2010: Joanne Mirtschin
- 2011: Margaret Satupai
- 2012: Dani Stevens
- 2013: Terina Keenan (NZL)
- 2014: Terina Keenan (NZL)
- 2015: Chelsea Lenarduzzi
- 2016: Chelsea Lenarduzzi
- 2017: Alifatou Djibril
- 2018: Maddi Wesche (NZL)
- 2019: Victoria Owers (NZL)
- 2020: Not held
- 2021: Lyvante Su'Emai
- 2022: Emma Berg

== Discus ==
- 1930: Not held
- 1931: Not held
- 1932: Not held
- 1933: Cora Hannan
- 1934: Not held
- 1935: Cora Hannan
- 1936: Doris Carter
- 1937: Cora Hannan
- 1938: Not held
- 1939: Not held
- 1940: Doris Carter
- 1941: Not held
- 1942: Not held
- 1943: Not held
- 1944: Not held
- 1945: Not held
- 1946: Not held
- 1947: Not held
- 1948: Charlotte MacGibbon
- 1949: Not held
- 1950: Charlotte MacGibbon
- 1951: Not held
- 1952: Jeanette Joy
- 1953: Not held
- 1954: Lorraine Murphy
- 1955: Not held
- 1956: Lois Jackman
- 1957: Not held
- 1958: Lois Jackman
- 1959: Not held
- 1960: Isabel De Neefe
- 1961: Not held
- 1962: Rosslyn Williams
- 1963: Mary McDonald
- 1964: Mary McDonald
- 1965: Jean Roberts
- 1966: Jane Adams
- 1967: Jean Roberts
- 1968: Jean Roberts
- 1969: Jean Roberts

- 1970: Jean Roberts
- 1971: Anne Karner
- 1972: Sue Culley
- 1973: Sue Culley
- 1974: Anne Karner
- 1975: Anne Karner
- 1976: Denise Ashford
- 1977: Gael Mulhall
- 1978: Gael Mulhall
- 1979: Gael Mulhall
- 1980: Gael Mulhall
- 1981: Gael Mulhall
- 1982: Andrina Rovis-Herman
- 1983: Gael Mulhall
- 1984: Gael Martin
- 1985: Sue Reinwald
- 1986: Gael Martin
- 1987: Gael Martin
- 1988: Astra Vitols
- 1989: Daniela Costian
- 1990: Daniela Costian
- 1991: Daniela Costian
- 1992: Daniela Costian
- 1993: Daniela Costian
- 1994: Daniela Costian
- 1995: Daniela Costian
- 1996: Lisa-Marie Vizaniari
- 1997: Beatrice Faumuina (NZL)
- 1998: Beatrice Faumuina (NZL)
- 1999: Lisa-Marie Vizaniari
- 2000: Alison Lever
- 2001: Alison Lever
- 2002: Beatrice Faumuina (NZL)
- 2003: Beatrice Faumuina (NZL)
- 2004: Beatrice Faumuina (NZL)
- 2005: Beatrice Faumuina (NZL)
- 2006: Beatrice Faumuina (NZL)
- 2007: Dani Stevens
- 2008: Dani Stevens
- 2009: Dani Stevens

- 2010: Dani Stevens
- 2011: Dani Stevens
- 2012: Dani Stevens
- 2013: Terina Keenan (NZL)
- 2014: Dani Stevens
- 2015: Dani Stevens
- 2016: Dani Stevens
- 2017: Dani Stevens
- 2018: Dani Stevens
- 2019: Taryn Gollshewsky
- 2020: Not held
- 2021: Dani Stevens
- 2022: Jade Lally (GBR)

== Javelin ==
- 1930: Not held
- 1931: Not held
- 1932: Not held
- 1933: Clarice Kennedy
- 1934: Not held
- 1935: Clarice Kennedy
- 1936: Clarice Kennedy
- 1937: Elsie Jones
- 1938: Not held
- 1939: Not held
- 1940: Charlotte MacGibbon
- 1941: Not held
- 1942: Not held
- 1943: Not held
- 1944: Not held
- 1945: Not held
- 1946: Not held
- 1947: Not held
- 1948: Charlotte MacGibbon
- 1949: Not held
- 1950: Charlotte MacGibbon
- 1951: Not held
- 1952: Charlotte MacGibbon
- 1953: Not held
- 1954: Vera Pepper
- 1955: Not held
- 1956: Patricia O'Neill
- 1957: Not held
- 1958: Anna Pazera
- 1959: Not held
- 1960: Anna Pazera
- 1961: Not held
- 1962: Maureen Wright
- 1963: Anna Pazera
- 1964: Anna Pazera
- 1965: Pam Telfer
- 1966: Anna Pazera
- 1967: Anna Pazera
- 1968: Barbara Friedrich (USA)
- 1969: Mary Thomas

- 1970: Petra Rivers
- 1971: Petra Rivers
- 1972: Jenny Symon
- 1973: Jenny Symon
- 1974: Petra Rivers
- 1975: Chris Hunt
- 1976: Chris Hunt
- 1977: Pam Matthews
- 1978: Pam Matthews
- 1979: Pam Matthews
- 1980: Pam Matthews
- 1981: Petra Rivers
- 1982: Petra Rivers
- 1983: Petra Rivers
- 1984: Petra Rivers
- 1985: Jeanette Kieboom
- 1986: Sue Howland
- 1987: Sue Howland
- 1988: Kate Farrow
- 1989: Kaye Nordstrom (NZL)
- 1990: Louise McPaul
- 1991: Louise McPaul
- 1992: Akiko Mayajima (JPN)
- 1993: Louise McPaul
- 1994: Joanna Stone
- 1995: Kirsten Hellier (NZL)
- 1996: Tanja Damaske (GER)
- 1997: Joanna Stone
- 1998: Louise McPaul
- 1999: Hayley Wilson (NZL)
- 2000: Sueli Dos Santos (BRA)
- 2001: Bina Ramesh (FRA)
- 2002: Bina Ramesh (FRA)
- 2003: Bina Ramesh (FRA)
- 2004: Bina Ramesh (FRA)
- 2005: Kimberley Mickle
- 2006: Kimberley Mickle
- 2007: Kimberley Mickle
- 2008: Katherine Mitchell
- 2009: Kimberley Mickle

- 2010: Kimberley Mickle
- 2011: Kimberley Mickle
- 2012: Kimberley Mickle
- 2013: Kimberley Mickle
- 2014: Kimberley Mickle
- 2015: Sunette Viljoen (RSA)
- 2016: Lu Huihui (CHN)
- 2017: Kelsey-Lee Roberts
- 2018: Katherine Mitchell
- 2019: Kelsey-Lee Barber
- 2020: Not held
- 2021: Kathryn Mitchell
- 2022: Mackenzie Little

== Hammer throw ==
- 1980: Not held
- 1981: Not held
- 1982: Not held
- 1983: Not held
- 1984: Not held
- 1985: Not held
- 1986: Not held
- 1987: Bernadette Serone
- 1988: Bernadette Serone
- 1989: Joanne Capper
- 1990: Bernadette Serone
- 1991: Bernadette Serone
- 1992: Deborah Sosimenko
- 1993: Deborah Sosimenko
- 1994: Deborah Sosimenko
- 1995: Deborah Sosimenko
- 1996: Olga Kuzenkova (RUS)
- 1997: Deborah Sosimenko
- 1998: Deborah Sosimenko
- 1999: Deborah Sosimenko
- 2000: Lisa Misipeka (ASA)
- 2001: Bronwyn Eagles
- 2002: Bronwyn Eagles
- 2003: Brooke Billett
- 2004: Bronwyn Eagles
- 2005: Bronwyn Eagles
- 2006: Brooke Billett
- 2007: Karyne Di Marco
- 2008: Bronwyn Eagles
- 2009: Bronwyn Eagles
- 2010: Gabrielle Neighbour
- 2011: Gabrielle Neighbour
- 2012: Gabrielle Neighbour
- 2013: Lara Nielsen
- 2014: Lara Nielsen
- 2015: Lara Nielsen
- 2016: Akane Watanabe (JPN)
- 2017: Lara Nielsen
- 2018: Alexandra Hulley
- 2019: Alexandra Hulley
- 2020: Not held
- 2021: Alexandra Hulley
- 2022: Alexandra Hulley

== Pentathlon ==
Events: 80 metres hurdles, high jump, shot put, long jump, 200 m until 1970
Events: 100 metres hurdles, high jump, shot put, long jump, 200 m until 1977
Events: 100 metres hurdles, high jump, shot put, long jump, 800 m until discontinuation

- 1953: Not held
- 1954: Not held
- 1955: Not held
- 1956: Norma Rose
- 1957: Not held
- 1958: Marlene Middlemiss
- 1959: Not held
- 1960: Helen Frith
- 1961: Not held
- 1962: Helen Frith
- 1963: Pam Kilborn
- 1964: Helen Frith
- 1965: Helen Frith
- 1966: Helen Frith
- 1967: Pam Kilborn
- 1968: Pam Kilborn
- 1969: Jeanette Tandy
- 1970: Jeanette Tandy
- 1971: Diane Pease
- 1972: Lyn Tillett
- 1973: Erica Nixon
- 1974: Erica Nixon
- 1975: Erica Nixon
- 1976: Erica Nixon
- 1977: Erica Hooker
- 1978: Glynis Nunn
- 1979: Margaret Hamley
- 1980: Glynis Nunn

== Heptathlon ==
Events: 100 metres hurdles, shot put, high jump, 200 m, long jump, javelin, 800 m

- 1980: Not held
- 1981: Glynis Nunn
- 1982: Glynis Nunn
- 1983: Terri Genge (NZL)
- 1984: Glynis Nunn
- 1985: Jocelyn Millar-Cubit
- 1986: Jane Flemming
- 1987: Jane Flemming
- 1988: Jane Flemming
- 1989: Sharon Jaklofsky-Smith
- 1990: Katie Ackerman
- 1991: Leisa Bruce
- 1992: Kylie Coombe
- 1993: Jane Flemming
- 1994: Jane Flemming
- 1995: Jane Jamieson
- 1996: Jane Jamieson
- 1997: Clare Thompson
- 1998: Jane Jamieson
- 1999: Sherryl Morrow
- 2000: Sherryl Morrow
- 2001: Jane Jamieson
- 2002: Clare Thompson
- 2003: Kylie Wheeler
- 2004: Kylie Wheeler
- 2005: Kylie Wheeler
- 2006: Kylie Wheeler
- 2007: Kylie Wheeler
- 2008: Kylie Wheeler
- 2009: Lauren Foote
- 2010: Rebecca Robinson
- 2011: Lauren Foote
- 2012: Megan Wheatley
- 2013: Portia Bing (NZL)
- 2014: Sophie Stanwell
- 2015: Veronica Torr (NZL)
- 2016: Sophie Stanwell
- 2017: Alysha Burnett
- 2018: Celeste Mucci
- 2019: Celeste Mucci
- 2020: Tori West
- 2021: Taneille Crase
- 2022: Taneille Crase

== See also ==
- Australian athletics champions (men)
- Australian Championships in Athletics
- Athletics Australia
