= 1969 Pacific Conference Games =

I Pacific Conference Games
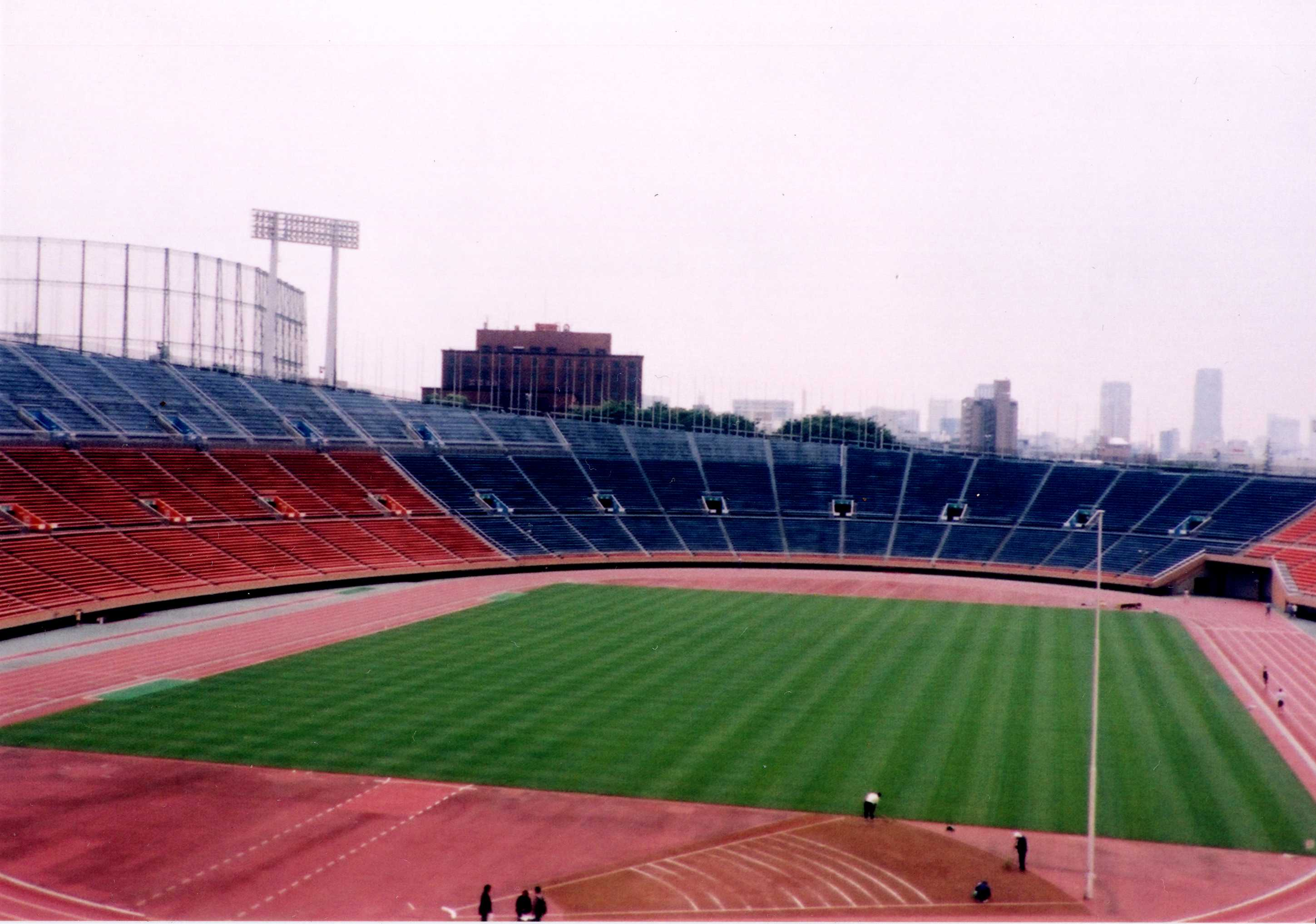
- The host stadium
- Dates: 26–27 September
- Host city: Tokyo, Japan
- Venue: National Olympic Stadium
- Events: 32

The 1969 Pacific Conference Games was the first edition of the international athletics competition between five Pacific coast nations: Australia, Canada, Japan, New Zealand and the United States. It was held from 26–27 September at the National Olympic Stadium in Tokyo, Japan. A total of 20 men's and 12 women's athletics events were contested.

== Medal summary ==
=== Men ===
| Event | Gold | | Silver | | Bronze | |
|---|---|---|---|---|---|---|
| 100 metres | Ivory Crockett (USA) | 10.4 | Greg Lewis (AUS) | 10.6 | Masahide Jinno (JPN) | 10.6 |
| 200 metres | Peter Norman (AUS) | 21.0 | Greg Lewis (AUS) | 21.0 | Ivory Crockett (USA) | 21.3 |
| 400 metres | Len van Hofwegen (USA) | 46.6 | Jay Elbel (USA) | 47.6 | Tony Powell (CAN) | 48.1 |
| 800 metres | Ralph Doubell (AUS) | 1:48.0 | Keith Wheeler (AUS) | 1:48.9 | Lowell Paul (USA) | 1:48.9 |
| 1500 metres | Tony Benson (AUS) | 3:43.8 | Dick Tayler (NZL) | 3:44.7 | Norm Trerise (CAN) | 3:45.4 |
| 5000 metres | Tracy Smith (USA) | 13:40.2 | Rex Maddaford (NZL) | 13:45.8 | John Coyle (AUS) | 13:48.0 |
| 10,000 metres | Kenny Moore (USA) | 29:01.2 | Tsugumichi Suzuki (JPN) | 29:01.4 | Dave Lotty (AUS) | 29:02.4 |
| 110 m hurdles | Gary Power (USA) | 14.1 | Mal Baird (AUS) | 14.4 | Dale Frederick (AUS) | 14.5 |
| 400 m hurdles | Gary Knoke (AUS) | 51.0 | Bill Hooker (AUS) | 52.7 | Brian Donnelly (CAN) | 52.9 |
| 3000 metres steeplechase | Kerry O'Brien (AUS) | 8:35.4 | Tony Manning (AUS) | 8:35.6 | Taketsugu Saruwatari (JPN) | 8:35.8 |
| 4 × 100 m relay | Australia (AUS); Greg Lewis; Phil May; Peter Norman; Murray Tolbert | 40.8 | Japan (JPN) | 40.9 | United States (USA) | 41.2 |
| 4 × 400 m relay | United States (USA) | 3:07.4 | Canada (CAN) | 3:12.7 | Australia (AUS); Ralph Doubell; Bill Hooker; Phil King; Gary Knoke | 3:13.3 |
| High jump | Lawrie Peckham (AUS) | 2.14 m | Phil Shinnick (USA) | 2.06 m | Hidehiko Tomizawa (JPN) | 2.06 m |
| Pole vault | Kyoichiro Inoue (JPN) | 5.10 m | Bob Seagren (USA) | 4.90 m | Kiyoshi Niwa (JPN) | 4.90 m |
| Long jump | Phil May (AUS) | 7.74 m | Shinji Ogura (JPN) | 7.58 m | Hiroomi Yamada (JPN) | 7.56 m |
| Triple jump | Phil May (AUS) | 16.53 m | Yukito Muraki (JPN) | 16.36 m | Toshiaki Inoue (JPN) | 15.88 m |
| Shot put | Les Mills (NZL) | 18.90 m | Brian Oldfield (USA) | 18.85 m | Dave Steen (CAN) | 18.54 m |
| Discus throw | George Puce (CAN) | 56.00 m | Tim Vollmer (USA) | 54.96 m | Dave Steen (CAN) | 54.94 m |
| Hammer throw | George Frenn (USA) | 65.00 m | Yoshihisa Ishida (JPN) | 64.74 m | Shigenobu Murofushi (JPN) | 63.32 m |
| Javelin throw | Milt Sonsky (USA) | 80.36 m | Hisao Yamamoto (JPN) | 75.34 m | Sig Koscik (AUS) | 73.84 m |

=== Women ===
| Event | Gold | | Silver | | Bronze | |
|---|---|---|---|---|---|---|
| 100 metres | Marion Hoffman (AUS) | 11.7 | Penny Haworth (NZL) | 11.9 | Stephanie Berto (CAN) | 11.9 |
| 200 metres | Raelene Boyle (AUS) | 23.9 | Marion Hoffman (AUS) | 24.1 | Penny Haworth (NZL) | 24.3 |
| 400 metres | Kathy Hammond (USA) | 53.4 | Lorraine Wilson (NZL) | 54.5 | Nancy Shafer (USA) | 54.6 |
| 800 metres | Cheryl Peasley (AUS) | 2:04.7 | Doris Brown (USA) | 2:05.4 | Nancy Shafer (USA) | 2:06.5 |
| 1500 metres | Doris Brown (USA) | 4:19.9 | Val Robinson (NZL) | 4:23.0 | Francie Larrieu (USA) | 4:28.5 |
| 100 m hurdles | Pam Kilborn (AUS) | 13.3 | Penny McCallum (AUS) | 14.0 | Mamie Rallins (USA) | 14.2 |
| 4 × 100 m relay | Australia (AUS); Raelene Boyle; Marion Hoffman; Jenny Lamy; Diane Pease | 45.1 | Canada (CAN) | 46.0 | New Zealand (NZL) | 46.4 |
| High jump | Debbie Brill (CAN) | 1.71 m | Carolyn Wright (AUS) | 1.71 m | Susan Baster (NZL) Diane Jones (CAN) | 1.60 m |
| Long jump | Willye White (USA) | 6.26w m | Hiroko Yamashita (JPN) | 6.11 m | Brenda Eisler (CAN) | 5.98 m |
| Shot put | Barbara Poulsen (NZL) | 14.90 m | Lynn Graham (USA) | 14.84 m | Diane Charteris (NZL) | 14.48 m |
| Discus throw | Jean Roberts (AUS) | 51.14 m | Carol Martin (CAN) | 45.72 m | Diane Charteris (NZL) | 45.28 m |
| Javelin throw | Jay Dahlgren (CAN) | 54.40 m | Petra Rivers (AUS) | 52.58 m | Chris Thompson (AUS) | 50.76 m |
