= 1973 Pacific Conference Games =

II Pacific Conference Games
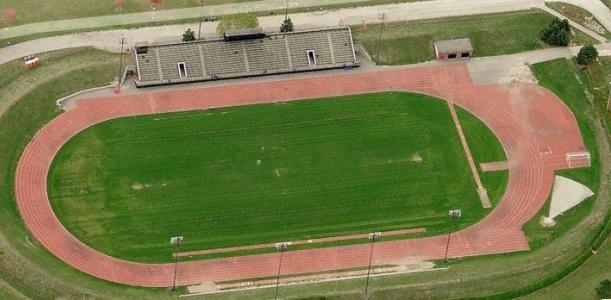
- The host stadium
- Dates: 27–28 June
- Host city: Toronto, Canada
- Venue: Centennial Park Stadium
- Events: 32

The 1973 Pacific Conference Games was the second edition of the international athletics competition between five Pacific coast nations: Australia, Canada, Japan, New Zealand and the United States. It was held on June 27 and 28 in Toronto. A total of 20 men's and 12 women's athletics events were contested.

== Medal summary ==
=== Men ===
Event	Gold		Silver		Bronze	
100 metres	Herb Washington (USA)	10.5	Masahide Jinno (JPN)	10.6	Ivory Crockett (USA)	10.6
200 metres	Marshall Dill (USA)	21.2	Mark Lutz (USA)	21.2	Bevan Smith (NZL)	21.5
400 metres	Maurice Peoples (USA)	45.5	Carl Farmer (USA)	46.9	Bill Hooker (AUS)	47.1
800 metres	Rick Wohlhuter (USA)	1:49.2	Bill Hooker (AUS)	1:49.6	John Walker (NZL)	1:50.0
1500 metres	Rod Dixon (NZL)	3:42.0	Tony Polhill (NZL)	3:42.5	Chuck LaBenz (USA)	3:42.9
5000 metres	Grant McLaren (CAN)	13:38.4	Dick Quax (NZL)	13:38.8	Dick Buerkle (USA)	13:48.8
10,000 metres	Ichio Sato (JPN)	29:21.0	Dan Shaughnessy (CAN)	29:23.0	Dick Tayler (NZL)	29:34.6
110 m hurdles	Thomas Hill (USA)	13.7	Warren Parr (AUS)	14.2	Mal Baird (AUS)	14.4
400 m hurdles	Robert Primeaux (USA)	50.8	Gary Knoke (AUS)	51.6	David Jarvis (CAN)	52.5
3000 metres steeplechase	Kerry O'Brien (AUS)	8:36.6	Barry Brown (USA)	8:37.4	Takaharu Koyama (JPN)	8:39.2
4×100 m relay	United States (USA)	39.7	New Zealand (NZL)	40.6	Japan (JPN)	40.6
4×400 m relay	United States (USA)	3:07.0	New Zealand (NZL)	3:10.0	Canada (CAN)	3:11.0
High jump	John Hawkins (CAN)	2.18 m	Chris Dunn (USA)	2.14 m	Claude Ferragne (CAN) Lawrie Peckham (AUS) Hidehiko Tomizawa (JPN)	2.09 m
Pole vault	Vic Dias (USA)	5.15 m	Bruce Simpson (CAN)	5.10 m	Ray Boyd (AUS)	5.00 m
Long jump	Al Lanier (USA)	7.98 m	Chris Commons (AUS)	7.91 m	Rick Cuttell (CAN)	7.59 m
Triple jump	John Craft (USA)	16.39 m	Mick McGrath (AUS)	15.75 m	Phil May (AUS)	15.71 m
Shot put	Sam Walker (USA)	19.04 m	Bruce Pirnie (CAN)	18.04 m	Ray Rigby (AUS)	17.19 m
Discus throw	Mac Wilkins (USA)	61.26 m	Ain Roost (CAN)	55.68 m	Tony Pervan (NZL)	51.32 m
Hammer throw	Peter Farmer (AUS)	64.94 m	Yoshihisa Ishida (JPN)	62.96 m	Al Hall (USA)	62.66 m
Javelin throw	Cary Feldmann (USA)	82.50 m	Sig Koscik (AUS)	69.36 m	Minoru Onda (JPN)	68.28 m

=== Women ===
Event	Gold		Silver		Bronze	
100 metres	Raelene Boyle (AUS)	11.8	Wendy Brown (NZL)	11.8	Denise Robertson (AUS)	11.8
200 metres	Denise Robertson (AUS)	23.6	Raelene Boyle (AUS)	23.7	Jackie Thompson (USA)	24.0
400 metres	Judy Canty (AUS)	52.9	Charlene Rendina (AUS)	52.9	Joyce Sadowick (CAN)	54.0
800 metres	Mary Decker (USA)	2:05.1	Charlene Rendina (AUS)	2:05.2	Glenda Reiser (CAN)	2:05.2
1500 metres	Francie Larrieu (USA)	4:12.5	Glenda Reiser (CAN)	4:13.4	Thelma Wright (CAN)	4:16.9
100 m hurdles	Patty Johnson (USA)	13.5	Gaye Dell (AUS)	14.0	Wendy Taylor (CAN)	14.1
4×100 m relay	Australia (AUS); Denise Robertson; Raelene Boyle; Gaye Dell; Lyn Jacenko	45.3	Canada (CAN)	45.3	United States (USA)	45.4
High jump	Louise Hanna (CAN)	1.74 m	Mikiko Sone (JPN) Debbie Van Kiekebelt (CAN)	1.71 m	Not awarded	
Long jump	Martha Watson (USA)	6.37 m	Lyn Tillett (AUS)	6.34 m	Erica Nixon (AUS)	6.28 m
Shot put	Maren Seidler (USA)	15.61 m	Kayoko Hayashi (JPN)	15.14 m	Valerie Young (NZL)	14.62 m
Discus throw	Carol Martin (CAN)	50.60 m	Joan Pavelich (CAN)	47.48 m	Kayoko Hayashi (JPN)	44.68 m
Javelin throw	Kate Schmidt (USA)	57.94 m	Mieko Takasaka (JPN)	49.62 m	Petra Rivers (AUS)	47.14 m
