= 1981 Pacific Conference Games =

IV Pacific Conference Games
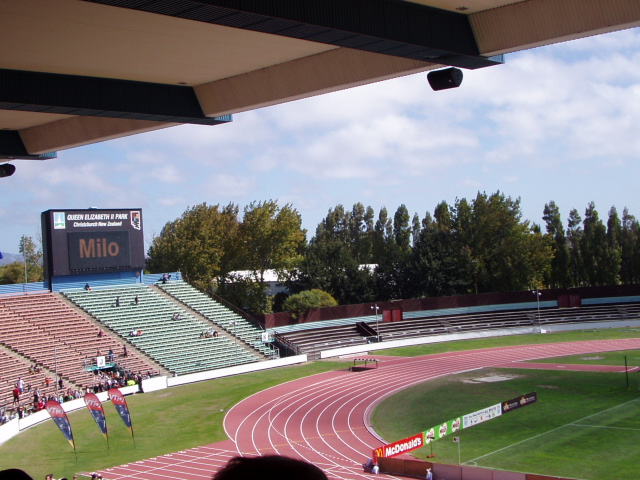
- The host stadium
- Dates: 31 January and 1 February
- Host city: Christchurch, New Zealand
- Venue: Queen Elizabeth II Park
- Events: 37

The 1981 Pacific Conference Games was the fourth edition of the international athletics competition between five Pacific coast nations: Australia, Canada, Japan, New Zealand and the United States. This was the first occasion that athletes from beyond the Pacific grouping were allowed to compete at the tournament. A total of 21 men's and 16 women's athletics events were contested. Combined track and field events were included for the first time, in the form of the men's decathlon and the women's pentathlon. The women's 3000 metres was also a new addition to the programme.

It was held at Queen Elizabeth II Park on 31 January and 1 February in Christchurch, New Zealand. The host stadium was built for and hosted 1974 British Commonwealth Games.

The competition had mandatory drug testing and two gold medallists were banned from the sport by the International Amateur Athletic Federation (IAAF) after anabolic steroids were detected in their urine. Ben Plucknett, an American who broke the men's discus world record twice that year, was stripped of his win in that event and later tried to sue the IAAF. Four-time Olympic champion Al Oerter stated that Plucknett had been made an example of due to his record breaking. Another American Olympian John Powell—who was consequently elevated to the Pacific Conference discus gold—criticised the fact that bans came top-down from the federation, rather than being seen before a judge or jury.

Australia's Gael Mulhall similarly had her shot put and discus titles removed for the same doping violation. Mulhall considered a legal appeal and team mate Bev Francis (who was promoted to the shot put gold) criticised the testing procedure, which had no team officials or doctors present. Ultimately Mulhall accepted a reduced 18-month ban, but did not publicly confirm whether she had taken steroids or not. Mulhall was criticised by Australian officials and members of the public as a drug cheat. She argued that testing was not of a reliable standard given the gravity of the sanctions and damage to her reputation, as well as saying that athletes needed more information on drugs and their effects.

== Medal summary ==
=== Men ===
Event	Gold		Silver		Bronze	
100 metres	Peter Gandy (AUS)	10.42	Desai Williams (CAN)	10.50	Steve Williams (USA)	10.59
200 metres	Peter Gandy (AUS)	20.89	Bruce Frayne (AUS)	21.03	Desai Williams (CAN)	21.07
400 metres	Ed Yearwood (USA)	46.53	Palmer Simmons (USA)	46.78	Mike Willis (AUS)	46.95
800 metres	András Paróczai (HUN)	1:48.17	Peter Bourke (AUS)	1:49.06	John Walker (NZL)	1:49.41
1500 metres	Mike Hillardt (AUS)	3:41.74	Richie Harris (USA)	3:41.77	Mirosław Żerkowski (POL)	3:42.15
5000 metres	Dave Moorcroft (GBR)	13:36.79	Dick Buerkle (USA)	13:46.19	Masami Otsuka (JPN)	13:57.04
10,000 metres	Rod Dixon (NZL)	28:35.69	Peter Butler (CAN)	28:39.58	John Andrews (AUS)	28:41.70
110 m hurdles	Sam Turner (USA)	13.80	Max Binnington (AUS)	13.88	Pat Fogarty (CAN)	14.22
400 m hurdles	Harald Schmid (FRG)	50.35	Lloyd Guss (CAN)	50.79	Yukihiro Yoshimatsu (JPN)	50.83
3000 metres steeplechase	Bronisław Malinowski (POL)	8:24.02	Bogusław Mamiński (POL)	8:24.04	Greg Duhaime (CAN)	8:26.51
4×100 m relay	Canada (CAN); Mark McKoy; Tony Sharpe; Desai Williams; Ben Johnson	39.6	Australia (AUS); Max Binnington; Bruce Frayne; Gerrard Keating; Peter Gandy	39.8	New Zealand (NZL); Ian Ferguson; Murray Cumberpatch; John Enright; Shane Downey	41.4
4×400 m relay	Australia (AUS); Garry Brown; John Fleming; Bruce Frayne; Mike Willis	3:07.03	Canada (CAN)	3:08.16	United States (USA)	3:08.18
High jump	Dean Bauck (CAN)	2.21 m	Nat Page (USA)	2.21 m	Cai Shu (CHN)	2.15 m
Pole vault	Tomomi Takahashi (JPN)	5.25 m	Charlie Brown (USA)	5.05 m	Ray Boyd (AUS)	5.05 m
Long jump	Mike Marlow (USA)	7.64 m	Steven Knott (AUS)	7.49 m	Ikko Omura (JPN)	7.36 m
Triple jump	Mike Marlow (USA)	16.49 m	Ken Lorraway (AUS)	16.32 m	Masami Nakanishi (JPN)	16.21 m
Shot put	Colin Anderson (USA)	19.76 m	Bishop Dolegiewicz (CAN)	18.67 m	Mike Mercer (CAN)	17.62 m
Discus throw^{[nb1]}	John Powell (USA)	59.54 m	Robin Tait (NZL)	56.08 m	Rob Gray (CAN)	55.42 m
Hammer throw	Shigenobu Murofushi (JPN)	69.52 m	Dave McKenzie (USA)	67.68 m	Gus Puopolo (AUS)	62.62 m
Javelin throw	Miklós Németh (HUN)	84.56 m	Phil Olsen (CAN)	77.36 m	Mike O'Rourke (NZL)	76.86 m
Decathlon	John Crist (USA)	7869 pts	Mauricio Bardales (USA)	7778 pts	Peter Hadfield (AUS)	7672 pts

- ^{nb1} Ben Plucknett of the United States was the original men's discus throw winner but his title was removed and his marks erased from the record due to his failing a doping test at the competition.

=== Women ===
Event	Gold		Silver		Bronze	
100 metres	Angela Bailey (CAN)	11.46	Diane Holden (AUS)	11.65	Helen Edwards (AUS)	11.67
200 metres	Angela Bailey (CAN)	23.37	Diane Holden (AUS)	23.47	Helen Edwards (AUS)	23.50
400 metres	Michelle Baumgartner (AUS)	52.85	Molly Killingbeck (CAN)	54.01	Marian O'Shaughnessy (AUS)	54.30
800 metres	Leann Warren (USA)	2:03.52	Terri Cater (AUS)	2:04.02	Liz Laban (GBR)	2:04.25
1500 metres	Brit McRoberts (CAN)	4:11.87	Cindy Bremser (USA)	4:12.21	Anna Bukis (POL)	4:14.65
3000 metres	Lorraine Moller (NZL)	9:07.86	Cindy Bremser (USA)	9:09.22	Barbara Moore (NZL)	9:14.94
100 m hurdles	Grażyna Rabsztyn (POL)	13.25	Linda Weekly (USA)	13.77	Emi Akimoto (JPN)	13.83
400 m hurdles	Lyn Foreman (AUS)	57.73	Yumiko Aoi (JPN)	59.74	Terry Yaxley (NZL)	60.10
4×100 m relay	Canada (CAN)	44.5	United States (USA)	45.4	Japan (JPN)	45.7
4×400 m relay	Australia (AUS); Michelle Baumgartner; Terri Cater; Lyn Foreman; Marian O'Shaughnessy	3:34.20	United States (USA)	3:38.81	Canada (CAN)	3:40.56
High jump	Hisayo Fukumitsu (JPN)	1.89 m	Brigitte Reid (CAN)	1.86 m	Chris Stanton (AUS)	1.83 m
Long jump	Linda Garden (AUS)	6.53 m	Pamela Hendren (NZL)	6.25 m	Jodi Anderson (USA)	6.16 m
Shot put^{[nb2]}	Bev Francis (AUS)	16.17 m	Denise Wood (USA)	14.79 m	Sandy Burke (USA)	14.72 m
Discus throw^{[nb2]}	Zhu Junfang (CHN)	55.48 m	Denise Wood (USA)	52.60 m	Lucette Moreau (CAN)	50.60 m
Javelin throw	Tessa Sanderson (GBR)	61.56 m	Sue Howland (AUS)	60.36 m	Karen Smith (USA)	59.92 m
Pentathlon	Karen Page (NZL)	4348 pts	Glynis Saunders (AUS)	4290 pts	Jill Ross (CAN)	4288 pts

- ^{nb2} Australia's Gael Mulhall was the original women's shot put and discus throw winner but her titles were removed and her marks erased from the record due to her failing a doping test at the competition.
