= Athletics at the 1978 Commonwealth Games – Women's long jump =

Women's long jump at the Commonwealth Games

The women's long jump event at the 1978 Commonwealth Games was held on 10 and 11 August at the Commonwealth Stadium in Edmonton, Alberta, Canada.

== Medalists ==
Gold	Silver	Bronze
Sue Reeve; England	Erica Hooker; Australia	June Griffith; Guyana

== Results ==
=== Qualification ===
Held on 10 August

Rank	Name	Nationality	Result	Notes
	Erica Hooker	Australia	6.16	q
	Lynette Jacenko	Australia	6.16	q
13	Jennifer Swanston	Barbados	5.52	
	Charity Muhuhe	Kenya	DNS	
	Hannah Bantamoi	Sierra Leone	DNS	

=== Final ===
Held on 11 August

Rank	Name	Nationality	Result	Notes
1st place, gold medalist(s)	Sue Reeve	England	6.59	
2nd place, silver medalist(s)	Erica Hooker	Australia	6.58	
3rd place, bronze medalist(s)	June Griffith	Guyana	6.52	
4	Susan Hearnshaw	England	6.40	
5	Shonel Ferguson	Bahamas	6.24	
6	Jeanette Yawson	Ghana	6.19	
7	Ruth Howell	Wales	6.17	
8	Lynette Jacenko	Australia	6.14	
9	Jill Ross	Canada	6.07	
10	Diane Jones-Konihowski	Canada	6.05	
11	Noeline Hodgins	New Zealand	5.86	
12	Esther Otieno	Kenya	5.84	
