= Stephanie Berto =

Canadian sprinter (born 1953)

Personal information
- Born: March 13, 1953 (age 73) Vancouver, Canada
- Height: 161 cm (5 ft 3 in)
- Weight: 55 kg (121 lb)

Sport
- Sport: Athletics
- Event: Sprints
- Club: West Vancouver
Medal record
Women's athletics
Representing Canada
British Commonwealth Games
Bronze medal – third place	1970 Edinburgh	4 x 100 m relay
Pan American Games
Gold medal – first place	1971 Cali	200 metres
Silver medal – second place	1971 Cali	100 metres
Pacific Conference Games
Silver medal – second place	1969 Tokyo	4 x 100 m relay
Bronze medal – third place	1969 Tokyo	100 meters

Stephanie Berto (born March 13, 1953) is a Canadian retired track and field athlete.

== Biography ==
At the 1968 Olympic Games in Mexico City, she represented Canada in the women's 100 metres and 4 × 100 m relay, while becoming the youngest member of the Olympic team at age 15. At 16, she captured a bronze medal in 100 meters and a silver medal in the 4 x 100 meter relay at the 1969 Pacific Conference Games in Tokyo, Japan.

Berto won a bronze medal at the 1970 British Commonwealth Games in Edinburgh, Scotland, as a member of the 4 x 100 meter relay team.

Berto won a 100/200 metres sprint double at the Canadian Track and Field Championships in 1971. She also won both British WAAA Championships sprint events at the 1971 WAAA Championships.

Berto claimed the gold medal in the women's 200 metres event at the 1971 Pan American Games in Cali, Colombia, and silver in the 100 metres.

== National titles ==
- Canadian Track and Field Championships
  - 100 m: 1971
  - 200 m: 1971

== See also ==
- List of 100 metres national champions (women)
