= Peter Gandy =

Peter Gandy may refer to:

- Peter Gandy (author), British author who focuses on mysticism
- Peter Gandy (athlete) (born 1961), former Australian sprinter
