= Tony Benson =

Tony Benson is the name of

- Tony Benson (athlete) (born 1942), Australian long-distance runner
- Tony Benson (rugby league) (born 1965), New Zealand rugby league coach
