= Jennifer Frank =

Jennifer Frank may refer to

- Jenny Lamy (later Frank, born 1949), Australian sprinter
- Jenny Orr (later Frank, born 1953), Australian runner
