= Glenda Reiser =

Canadian middle-distance runner

Personal information
- Born: 16 June 1955 Ottawa, Ontario, Canada
- Died: 6 January 2008 (aged 52) Ottawa, Ontario, Canada
- Height: 167 cm (5 ft 6 in)
- Weight: 53 kg (117 lb)

Sport
- Sport: Athletics
- Event: middle-distance
- Club: Ottawa Kinsmen Harriers
Medal record
Women's athletics
Representing Canada
Summer Universiade
Silver medal – second place	1973 Moscow	1500 m
Pacific Conference Games
Silver medal – second place	1973 Toronto	1500 m
Bronze medal – third place	1973 Toronto	800 m
Commonwealth Games
Gold medal – first place	1974 Christchurch	1500 m

Glenda Reiser (16 June 1955 – 6 January 2008) was a Canadian middle-distance runner who competed at the 1972 Summer Olympics.

== Biography ==
Reiser was born in Ottawa and was a member of the Ottawa Kinsmen Harriers. She switched from swimming to track and field aged 15. She then progressed very rapidly in the sport and excelled as a junior, running the 1500 metres in 4 minutes 15.9 seconds.

Reiser competed in the inaugural women's 1500 metre Olympic event at the 1972 Summer Olympics in Munich, where she finished second in her heat with a time of 4 minutes 6.7 seconds to Lyudmila Bragina who broke the world record. Reiser's time was a World Junior Record. She was then eliminated in the semifinals.

On September 15, 1973 Glenda broke the world record for the women's mile. At the summer Universiade held in Moscow in 1973, Glenda took home a silver medal in the 1500 metres. She also took a silver medal in the 1500 metres, and a bronze medal in the 800 metres at 1973 Pacific Conference Games in Toronto; where she had a tight finish with Mary Decker (USA) and Charlene Rendina (Aus), in which all 3 medalist finished within 1/10 of a second of one other. She was the three time Canadian 1500-metre champion, won a gold medal at the distance at the 1974 Commonwealth Games in Christchurch, New Zealand breaking the games record twice along the way. Reiser finished third behind Grete Andersen in the 1500 metres event at the British 1974 WAAA Championships.

Reiser retired from running following the 1979 season and entered medicine, studying at the University of Ottawa. She became a family physician and later a psychotherapist for women. She was inducted into the Ottawa Sport Hall of Fame in 1988, and the Athletics Ontario Hall of Fame in 2013.

As of 2025, Reiser still holds the Canadian U18 indoor and outdoor records in the 1500m (4:21.0h and 4:06.71, respectively), and the U20 outdoor records in the 800m (2:03.17), 1000m (2:41.4h), 1500m (4:06.71).

Reiser died on January 6, 2008, age 52, after a long illness.
