= Molly Killingbeck =

Canadian sprinter (born 1959)

Personal information
- Born: March 2, 1959 (age 67) Clarendon Parish, Jamaica

Sport
- Sport: Track and field
Medal record
Representing Canada
Olympic Games
Silver medal – second place	1984 Los Angeles	4x400 m
Commonwealth Games
Gold medal – first place	1982 Brisbane	4 x400 m
Silver medal – second place	1982 Brisbane	4x100 m
Gold medal – first place	1986 Edinburgh	4x400 m
Pan American Games
Silver medal – second place	1983 Caracas	4x400 m
Silver medal – second place	1987 Indianapolis	4x400 m
Pacific Conference Games
Gold medal – first place	1981 Christchurch	4x100 m
Silver medal – second place	1981 Christchurch	400m
Bronze medal – third place	1981 Christchurch	4x400 m
Summer Universiade
Silver medal – second place	1983 Edmonton	400 m
Silver medal – second place	1983 Edmonton	4x100 m
Silver medal – second place	1983 Edmonton	4x400m
Silver medal – second place	1985 Kobe	4x400m

Mary Elizabeth "Molly" Killingbeck (born March 2, 1959) is a Canadian athlete who competed in two consecutive Summer Olympics for Canada, starting in 1984.

In 1981, Molly took the silver medal in the 400 metres at the Pacific Conference Games in New Zealand, she also took a gold in the 4 x 100 metre relay and a bronze in the 4 x 400 metre relay.

She won gold medals at the 1982 and 1986 Commonwealth games as a member of the 4 x 400 metre relay team, and a silver as part of the 4 x 100 metre relay team in 1982. She also won 3 silver medals at the Summer Universiade in 1983 as a member of both of Canada's 4 x 100 and 4 x 400 metre relay teams, and in the individual 400 meter race, as well as 2 Pan Am Games silver medals in the 1983 and 1987 games in the 4 x 400 metre relay.

At the 1984 Summer Olympics held in Los Angeles, U.S. she won the silver medal in the 4 x 400 metres with her teammates Charmaine Crooks, Jillian Richardson and Marita Payne.

== Admission of doping ==
Killingbeck admitted to using performance-enhancing drugs at the Dubin Inquiry in 1989 and subsequently had her funding suspended.
