= Carol Martin (athlete) =

Canadian track and field athlete

Personal information
- Nationality: Canadian
- Born: April 19, 1948 (age 78) Barrie, Ontario, Canada
- Education: York University
- Occupation: Massage therapist

Sport
- Sport: Athletics
- Event: discus throw
Medal record
Representing Canada
Women's Athletics
Commonwealth Games
| Bronze medal – third place | 1966 Kingston | discus |
| Bronze medal – third place | 1970 Edinburgh | discus |
| Bronze medal – third place | 1974 Christchurch | discus |
Pan-American Games
| Silver medal – second place | 1967 Winnipeg | discus |
| Bronze medal – third place | 1971 Cali | discus |
Pacific Conference Games
| Silver medal – second place | 1969 Tokyo | discus |
| Gold medal – first place | 1973 Toronto | discus |

Carol Lynne Martin (born April 19, 1948) is a former track-and-field athlete in discus, shot put and javelin.

== Biography ==
Martin represented Canada at the Commonwealth Games in 1966, 1970 and 1974, on each occasion winning the bronze medal for women's discus throw. She also represented Canada at the Pan-American Games, earning the silver medal for discus in 1967 and the bronze in 1971. Martin competed in discus at the Pacific Conference Games, winning silver in 1969 and gold in 1973. Martin competed on Canada's national track and field team for 10 years and held the Canadian women's title in discus for seven years.

Martin finished third behind fellow Canadian Jane Haist in the discus throw event at the British 1974 WAAA Championships.

Martin trained at the Don Mills Track Club in Toronto, Ontario, where she was coached by Lloyd Percival, an early adopter of interval training and massage.

In the early 1970s she enrolled at Simon Fraser University, helping to bring attention to the underfunded women's athletics programs there. She returned to Toronto and completed her B.A. at York University in 1975.

Following her athletic career, Martin coached and taught fitness classes, and became a registered massage therapist (RMT) in 1982. She became associated with the International Network of Esoteric Healing, and after 25 years of practise published Breathe: An Enlightened Living Hand Book in 2014.

== Works ==
- Martin, Carol (2014). Breathe: An Enlightened Living Hand Book. CreateSpace Publishing. ISBN 9781497531727.
