= Saruwatari =

Saruwatari (Japanese: 猿渡) is a Japanese surname. Notable people with the surname include:

- Taketsugu Saruwatari (猿渡 武嗣, born 1942), Japanese middle-distance runner
- Tetsuya Saruwatari (猿渡 哲也, born 1958), Japanese manga artist

== Fictional characters ==
- Goh Saruwatari (猿渡 ゴオ), protagonist of the anime series Godannar
- Gorou Saruwatari (猿渡 吾郎), a protagonist of the manga and anime series Moonlight Mile
- Shunsuke Saruwatari (猿渡 俊助), a character in the light novel series Hakata Tonkotsu Ramens
