= Athletics at the 1974 British Commonwealth Games – Women's 100 metres hurdles =

Women's 100 metres hurdles at the Commonwealth Games

The women's 100 metres hurdles event at the 1974 British Commonwealth Games was held on 29 and 31 January at the Queen Elizabeth II Park in Christchurch, New Zealand.

== Medalists ==
Gold	Silver	Bronze
Judy Vernon; England	Gaye Dell; Australia	Modupe Oshikoya; Nigeria

== Results ==
=== Heats ===
Held on 29 January

Qualification: First 5 in each heat (Q) and the next 1 fastest (q) qualify for the semifinals.

Wind:
Heat 1: +0.6 m/s, Heat 2: +1.0 m/s, Heat 3: +1.3 m/s

Rank	Heat	Name	Nationality	Time	Notes
1	1	Modupe Oshikoya	Nigeria	13.5	Q
2	1	Judy Vernon	England	13.8	Q
3	1	Sally Moir	Australia	13.87	Q, pb
4	1	Michelle Miles	New Zealand	14.1	Q
5	1	Ann Wilson	England	14.1	Q
6	1	Elizabeth Bruce	Ghana	14.9	q
	1	Myra Nimmo	Scotland	DNS	
1	2	Brenda Matthews	New Zealand	13.69	Q, pb
2	2	Jennifer Jones	Australia	13.79	Q
3	2	Elizabeth Damman	Canada	14.0	Q
4	2	Janet Honour	England	14.2	Q
5	2	Miriama Tuisorisori	Fiji	14.8	Q
1	3	Gaye Dell	Australia	13.33	Q, pb
2	3	Jan Lothian	New Zealand	14.0	Q
3	3	Mary Peters	Northern Ireland	14.35	Q
4	3	Ruth Kyalisima	Uganda	14.5	Q
5	3	Wendy Taylor	Canada	14.6	Q
6	3	Keta Iongi	Tonga	15.19	
	3	Eleanor Phillips	Fiji	DNS	

=== Semifinals ===
Held on 29 January

Qualification: First 4 in each semifinal (Q) qualify directly for the final.

Wind:
Heat 1: +0.2 m/s, Heat 2: -0.2 m/s

Rank	Heat	Name	Nationality	Time	Notes
1	1	Judy Vernon	England	13.7	Q
2	1	Jennifer Jones	Australia	13.92	Q
3	1	Sally Moir	Australia	13.99	Q
4	1	Elizabeth Damman	Canada	14.0	Q
5	1	Jan Lothian	New Zealand	14.26	
6	1	Janet Honour	England	14.37	
7	1	Ruth Kyalisima	Uganda	14.50	
8	1	Miriama Tuisorisori	Fiji	18.34	
1	2	Gaye Dell	Australia	13.58	Q
2	2	Modupe Oshikoya	Nigeria	13.6	Q
3	2	Brenda Matthews	New Zealand	13.9	Q
4	2	Michelle Miles	New Zealand	13.9	Q
5	2	Ann Wilson	England	14.29	
6	2	Wendy Taylor	Canada	14.59	
7	2	Elizabeth Bruce	Ghana	14.65	
8	2	Mary Peters	Northern Ireland	14.75	

=== Final ===
Held on 31 January

Wind: +1.0 m/s

Rank	Lane	Name	Nationality	Time	Notes
1st place, gold medalist(s)	4	Judy Vernon	England	13.45	
2nd place, silver medalist(s)	7	Gaye Dell	Australia	13.54	
3rd place, bronze medalist(s)	1	Modupe Oshikoya	Nigeria	13.69	
4	8	Jennifer Jones	Australia	13.83	
5	3	Michelle Miles	New Zealand	13.89	pb
6	5	Sally Moir	Australia	13.93	
7	2	Brenda Matthews	New Zealand	13.95	
8	6	Elizabeth Damman	Canada	13.97	
