= Wally Foreman =

Australian broadcaster and sports administrator

Wally Foreman AM
- Born: 5 January 1948; Kalgoorlie, Western Australia
- Died: 2 November 2006 (aged 58); Perth, Western Australia
- Occupation: Sports administrator

Walter John Foreman AM (5 January 1948 – 2 November 2006) was an Australian sports administrator and commentator for ABC Radio program "Grandstand" based in Perth, Western Australia.

== Life ==
Born in Kalgoorlie, Western Australia, but raised in Bruce Rock, Foreman worked in the sports media for more than 30 years. He started his career in the media when he was a journalist at the West Australian newspaper in 1972 and joined the ABC Sports Department in 1975. He left the ABC briefly to work in TV for Channel 9, before taking up a position with the ABC in Adelaide.

During his career, he covered a wide range of domestic and international sporting events including four Olympic Games, five Commonwealth Games, the Australian Open tennis tournament, World Cup athletics, Hockey World Cup tournaments and the Pacific Conference Games. He was a familiar voice throughout Australia, having commentated on AFL football, NBL basketball and various national championships.

Foreman was appointed to become the inaugural director of the Western Australian Institute of Sport (WAIS) in 1984 and held the position for more than 17 years.

In the lead up to the Sydney Olympic Games, he was involved in the development and implementation of the Olympic Athlete Program and acted as a consultant to both the Queensland and Tasmanian government with regards sports institutes being established in these states.

He resigned as WAIS director in 2001 and returned to work within the ABC Sports Department in Perth.

In 2003, he was appointed as a Member of the Order of Australia for his services to sport and was named Western Australia Citizen of the Year (Sport) in 2000. In 2000 he has also awarded the Australian Sports Medal (ASM).

He was married to Lyn Foreman, who is head coach (track) at the WAIS and is a national athletics champion, and had two sons.

Foreman suffered a heart attack on 31 October 2006 and died in Perth on the afternoon of 2 November 2006. His funeral service was held at Challenge Stadium and was attended by an estimated 3000 people, including the Premier of Western Australia, Alan Carpenter, sports stars Graham Moss, Dennis Lillee and Justin Langer, media colleagues Dennis Cometti, George Grljusich and Glenn Mitchell.

His biography, The Legend from Bruce Rock: The Wally Foreman Story, was released on 29 July 2017 by FFPress. It was written by his son, Glen Foreman, to Glen's daughter Charlotte, who would have been Foreman's first grandchild.
