= Terri Cater =

Australian athletics competitor

Terri Cater OAM
Personal information
- Nationality: Australian
- Born: Terri Anne Wangman; 25 September 1956 (age 70)
- Occupation: Police officer

Sport
- Sport: Track and field
Medal record
Athletics
Representing Australia
Commonwealth Games
Silver medal – second place	1974 Christchurch	4 × 400 m relay
Pacific Conference Games
Gold medal – first place	1981 Christchurch	4 × 400 m relay
Silver medal – second place	1981 Christchurch	800 m

Terri Anne Cater OAM (née Wangman; born 25 September 1956) is an Australian former sprinter and middle-distance runner. She was Australian women's 400 metres champion in 1981 and 800 metres champion in 1981 and 1982.

== Commonwealth Games ==
Cater competed at two Commonwealth Games: the 1974 British Commonwealth Games in Christchurch, New Zealand where she won a silver medal as part of the women's 4 × 400 metres relay team. Eight years later, she competed in the 1982 Commonwealth Games in Brisbane, Australia where she placed 4th in the final of the women's 800 metres.

== 1976 Olympic selection ==
In March 1976, Cater (as Terri Wangman) was selected for the 1976 Summer Olympics in Montreal, however there was subsequent controversy as she was selected over Barbara Wilson of Queensland, who ranked 4th in Australian athletic rankings compared to Wangman's 19th. Queensland MP Des Frawley raised the issue in the Queensland Parliament, asserting that the selection panel was "dominated by Victorians" whose "rotten, unprincipled actions" would deprive Australia of a certain medal win in Montreal. Selector Paul Jenes responded that the selected athlete would have to cover both relay events (4 × 100 and 4 × 400), and that Wangman as the 400 metre specialist would have a better chance than Wilson. In April, the men's and women's head selectors met with the Australian Olympic Federation justification committee, where they acknowledged they should have ranked the relay teams rather than individual runners, and Wilson was added to the Olympic team. This lowered Wangman's chances of competing by half, and she did not end up competing in Montreal.

== Other ==
Cater won the British WAAA Championships title in the 800 metres event at the 1982 WAAA Championships.

== Personal life ==
Outside of her athletics career, Cater was a police officer with Victoria Police.
