= Jean Roberts (athlete) =

Australian shot putter and discus thrower (1943–2024)

Personal information
- Nationality: Australian
- Born: Jean Evelyn Roberts; 18 August 1943 Geelong, Victoria, Australia
- Died: 17 September 2024 (aged 81) Canberra, Australia
- Height: 1.70 m (5 ft 7 in)
- Weight: 69 kg (152 lb)

Sport
- Sport: Athletics
- Events: Discus throw, shot put
- Club: Coburg Harriers, Coburg; Birchfield Harriers, Birmingham; Delaware Sports Club, Delaware USA
- Coached by: John Cheffers(1958-1968), Wilf Paish(1971-1972)

Achievements and titles
- Personal bests: DT – 55.91 m (1974); SP – 16.38 m (1972)
Medal record
Representing Australia
Commonwealth Games
Silver medal – second place	1962 Perth	Shot put
Silver medal – second place	1966 Kingston	Discus
Silver medal – second place	1970 Edinburgh	Discus
Bronze medal – third place	1970 Edinburgh	Shot put
Bronze medal – third place	1974 Christchurch	Shot put

Jean Evelyn Roberts (18 August 1943 – 17 September 2024) was an Australian Olympic athlete who competed in the shot put and discus throw events.

== Biography ==
Roberts competed for the Coburg club, alongside athletes such as Raelene Boyle and Carolyn Lewis.

Roberts won a total of 13 Australian Championships in Athletics between 1962 and 1970, including eight in the Shot Put. She also won two British Championships in the Shot Put in 1971 and 1972.

Roberts was a versatile athlete, winning the 1967 Victorian State Pentathlon championship with 3985 points and placing second in 1969.

She competed at four Commonwealth Games between 1962 and 1974, winning medals on each occasion, and represented Australia at the 1968 Olympic Games in Mexico City. Her elder sister Val Roberts competed in gymnastics at the 1960 and 1964 Olympics.

Roberts won the discus throw at the Pacific Conference Games in 1969 at Tokyo and won the British WAAA Championships title in the shot put event at the 1971 WAAA Championships.

Roberts also won the 1973 and 1975 American Athletic Union championships in the discus.

Roberts received her Doctorate of Education from Temple University in the mid 1970s and then coached and taught at the University of New Hampshire.

She coached thrower Gael Martin to two gold medals at the 1986 Commonwealth Games.

She was the first Director of Coaching for the Australian Athletic Union from 1979 -1985. She was appointed an administrator at the Australian Institute of Sport (AIS) in 1985 and worked there until 2001. Whilst at the AIS, she managed the Olympic Training Centre Programs in the lead up to the Sydney 2000 Olympics for athletes, coaches and sports medicine practitioners from Oceania and ten African countries.

Roberts career was recognised through several awards - Australian Olympic Committee Order of Merit (1996), Oceania Athletics’ Merit Award (1997) and the Australian Sports Medal (2000).

Roberts died in Canberra on 17 September 2024, at the age of 81.

== See also ==
- Australian athletics champions (Women)
