= Clarice Kennedy =

Australian athletics competitor

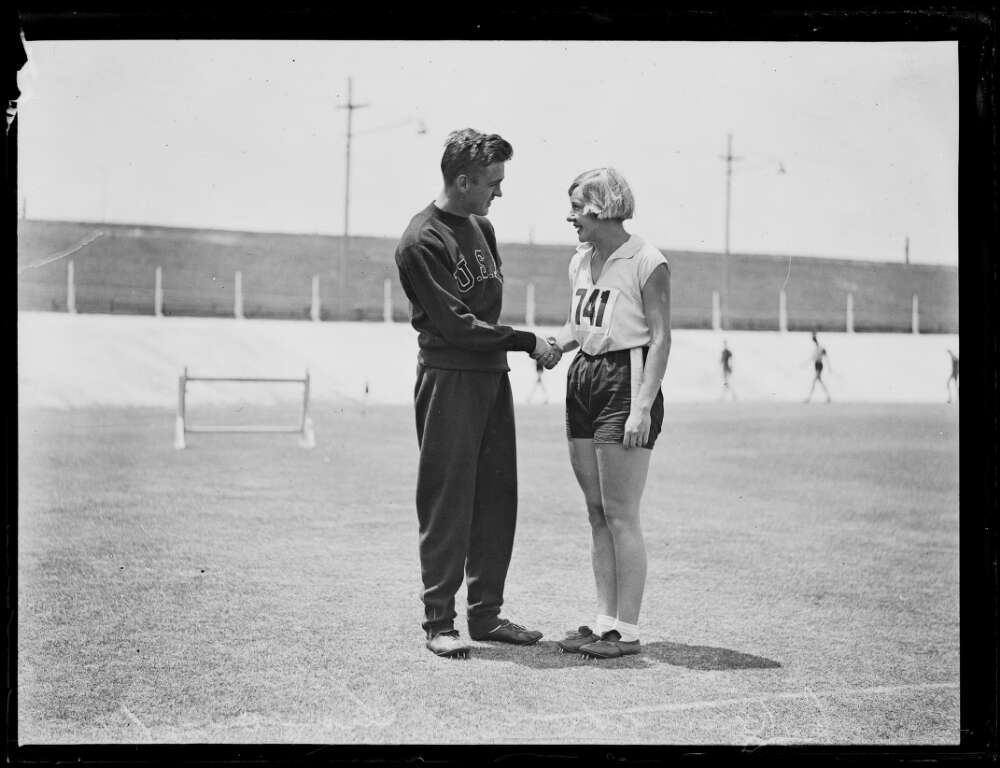
- Clarice Kennedy shaking hands with American athlete Leo Lermond, New South Wales, 11 January 1930

Personal information
- Full name: Clarice Mary Araluen Kennedy
- Died: 1998 (aged 87–88)

Sport
- Country: Australia

Clarice Mary Araluen Kennedy (4 September 1910 – 1998) was an Australian athlete who competed in a range of athletics events.

A student at Fort Street High School in Sydney, Kennedy was a versatile athlete in the late 1920s and 1930s, successful in swimming, diving, vigoro, hockey, tennis and basketball.

She set a range of Australian records in sprints, hurdles, 400 metres, 800 metres, Shot Put and Javelin and also won the inaugural NSW State Two-Mile Cross country championship. Her time of 12.2 for 80 metres hurdles in 1930 broke the world record but her performance was not ratified which greatly disappointed Kennedy. In the same year, Kennedy saved the life of a drowning boy.

In 1936 she won four events at the National Games (and Olympic trials) in Adelaide but she was not selected for the 1936 Berlin Games. Her omission caused an outrage with questions even asked in parliament.

In her career she won seven Australian championship at hurdles and javelin but only represented Australia at one international event, the 1938 British Empire Games in Sydney.

At the age of 59, Kennedy enrolled at University and went on to complete a Masters of Science degree with honours before completing a PhD. She had completed the first year of her Bachelor of Divinity when she died of cancer in 1998.

== See also ==
- Australian athletics champions (Women)
