= Cary Feldmann =

American track and field athlete

Cary Feldmann (born July 11, 1950) is an American former track and field athlete who competed in the javelin throw. He won two international gold medals in his career: at the 1971 Pan American Games with a games record of 81.52 m (267 ft 5 1/4 in) and at the 1973 Pacific Conference Games in a championship record of 82.50 m (270 ft 8 in).

At national level he won one American title at the USA Outdoor Track and Field Championships, topping the podium at the 1973 event. He had been runner-up nationally in 1971. Collegiately he competed for the Washington Huskies and was the 1971 winner at the NCAA Outdoor Championships, having placed third the year before. He achieved a personal record of 90.94 m (298 ft 4 1/4 in) on May 19, 1973. This ranked him fourth globally for that season.

== International competitions ==
Year	Competition	Venue	Position	Notes
1971	Pan American Games	Cali, Colombia	1st	81.52 m GR
1973	Pacific Conference Games	Toronto, Canada	1st	82.50 m CR

== National titles ==
- USA Outdoor Track and Field Championships
  - Javelin throw: 1973
