= Val Roberts =

Australian gymnast

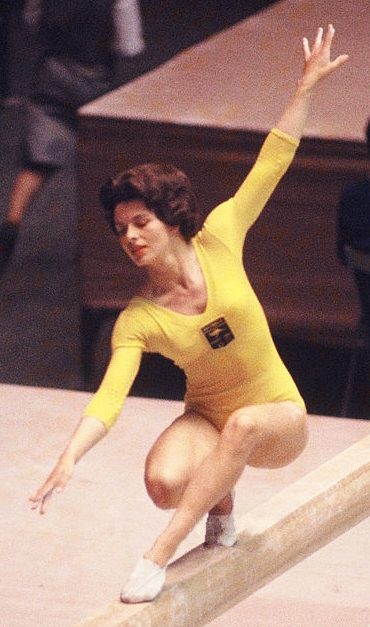
- Val Roberts at the 1964 Olympics

Personal information
- Nationality: Australia
- Born: 10 July 1938 Ballarat, Victoria, Australia
- Died: August 23, 2008 (aged 70)
- Height: 1.57 m (5 ft 2 in)
- Weight: 61 kg (134 lb)

Sport
- Sport: Artistic gymnastics

Valerie Lois "Val" Roberts (10 July 1938 – 23 August 2008) was an Australian gymnast. She competed at the 1960 and 1964 Olympics in all artistic gymnastics events and finished in 10th place with the Australian team in 1964. Her best individual result was 66th place on the balance beam in 1964. Her younger sister Jean Roberts was an Olympic discus thrower.

== Personal life ==
Val married Ray Beitzel, a chemical engineer, and had two children: Matthew, and Felice.
