= Lynn Graham =

American athlete (born 1947)

Medal record

Women's athletics

Representing the United States

Pan American Games
Silver medal – second place	1967 Winnipeg	Shot put
Gold medal – first place	1971 Cali	Shot put

Lynn Graham (born November 3, 1947) is an American former track and field athlete who specialized in the shot put. Graham was the Pan American Games gold medalist in 1971. She won six national titles in the shot put and one in the discus. Her lifetime personal record is 16.18 m (53 ft 1 in), set in Garden Grove, California on May 28, 1971.

== Career ==
Graham, born in an African-American family in California grew up in Los Angeles. Her talent for throwing events was quickly identified and a sixteen-year-old Graham was runner-up at the 1964 United States Olympic Trials and also third at the national Amateur Athletic Union meet. At the age of seventeen she won national titles in both the shot put and discus throw at the USA Outdoor Track and Field Championships. After 1965 she decided to focus mainly on the shot put instead, as it was her best event.

She defended her shot put national title in 1966 and claimed her first indoor American title at the USA Indoor Track and Field Championships the following year. Outdoors, she was beaten at the 1967 nationals by Maren Seidler, but still she was selected to represent the United States at the 1967 Pan American Games held in Winnipeg. Still a teenager, Graham claimed her first major international medal – a silver – behind Canada's Nancy McCredie, who had entered as the defending champion.

Graham's teenage shot put exploits remained the best of the nation for over two decades, with her national high school record lasting until 1990, when it was bettered by Stephanie Wadsworth. In 1968 Graham aimed to make her first Olympic team, but losses to Seidler at both the Olympic trials event and the national championships meant her younger rival was selected instead. The standard of American women's throwing was some way behind Europeans during the period – Graham's best throws were around fifteen while Margitta Gummel won the Olympic title that year with a world record of 19.61 m (64 ft 4 in).

Graham moved around clubs after this period, going from a Los Angeles-based club to the Millbrae Lions, then the Fresno Elans. This coincided with the best years of her career. She won three straight national titles from 1969 to 1971, upturning Seidler's position as America's top shot putter, and set a championship record mark of 15.85 m (52 ft 0 in). Her best international results followed at the inaugural 1969 Pacific Conference Games in Tokyo she was silver medallist behind Barbara Poulsen of New Zealand. The greatest win of her shot putting career came at the 1971 Pan American Games in Cali, Colombia. There she defeated Cuba's Grecia Hamilton to win the gold medal in a Pan American Games mark of 15.76 m (51 ft 8 1/4 in). That same year she achieved her personal record of 16.18 m (53 ft 1 in).

Graham's last year of high level competition was in 1972. Aiming yet again for the Olympic team, her perennial rival Maren Seidler emerged the better thrower and defeated her at both the Olympic trials and national championships. Graham retired from the sport thereafter while Seidler ultimately pushing American women's throwing to near European standards – her 1972 national win was the first of a nine-year streak which included in a championship record of 19.09 m (62 ft 7 1/2 in) in 1979.

== International competitions ==
Year	Competition	Venue	Position	Event	Notes
1967	Pan American Games	Winnipeg, Canada	2nd	Shot put	14.88 m
1969	Pacific Conference Games	Tokyo, Japan	2nd	Shot put	14.84 m
1971	Pan American Games	Cali, Colombia	1st	Shot put	15.76 m GR

== National titles ==
- USA Outdoor Track and Field Championships
  - Shot put: 1965, 1966, 1969, 1970, 1971
  - Discus throw: 1965
- USA Indoor Track and Field Championships
  - Shot put: 1967
