= Gaye Dell =

Personal information
- Nickname: Gaye Dell
- Nationality: United States; Australia
- Born: Dorothy Gaye Dell; 22 October 1948 (age 77) Australia

Boxing career
Medal record
Women's athletics
Representing Australia
Commonwealth Games
Silver medal – second place	1974 Christchurch	100 m hurdles

Dorothy Gaye Dell (née Murphy, born 22 October 1948) is an Australian Olympic athlete, author, and artist.

== Athletic career ==
Dell was the Australian National Champion in both 100 & 200 metres hurdles for five years running, from 1971 to 1976. She placed first in the Australian Open Track & Field Championships for Women's 200 metres hurdles for three consecutive years, from 1972 to 1975. At the 1973 Pacific Conference Games, she placed first in the 4 × 100 metres relay and second in the 100 metres hurdles. She received the silver medal at the 1974 British Commonwealth Games at Christchurch after representing Australia in the 100 metres hurdles. Also, in 1974, she achieved a personal best time of 13.33 seconds in the 100 metres hurdles. In 1976, she represented Australia in the Montreal Olympics, where, with a time of 13.68 seconds, she ranked 5th in round one, heat two of Women's 100 metres hurdles.

== Literary career ==
Dell has written several books for children. These include Bidge's Mob, 100+ Answers About Puberty, and 400+ Questions Kids Have About Relationships. As Senior Manager of Interrelate Family Centres, she has also written a series of books featuring the Listener SockPuppet Family, which includes The Listeners Go to a Family Centre, The Listeners Go to Counselling, and The Listeners Get a Parenting Plan. Dell has also illustrated several books, including Marilyn Maple's Two Bunny Tails.

== Other work ==
In 1971, she worked as an art teacher at Preston Girls School in Victoria, Australia. She worked at Lowther Hall Church of England Girls' Grammar School in Victoria, and later, while living in the United States, she taught graphic design at Santa Fe College, in Gainesville, Florida. In the 1980s, she worked as a graphic artist in Florida, where her work included designing restaurants for Holiday Inn and decorating dentist offices, as well as creating calendars, posters, T-shirts, menus, caricatures, and newsletters. In 1991, she collaborated with Jim Bohart and John King to create SunBuddys, animal-decorated static cling shades for car windows.

== Personal life & education ==
Dell was born in Victoria, Australia. In Victoria, she received a Bachelor of Arts for fine arts with a major in photography; she also received a Bachelor of Education. She attended the University of Florida on a full track and field athletic scholarship from 1977 to 1981, where she earned another Bachelor of Arts, majoring in drawing & creative writing. She holds dual nationality, being a citizen of both the United States and Australia.

== Bibliography ==
- Bidge's Mob
- 100+ Answers About Puberty
- 400+ Questions Kids Have About Relationships
- 500+ Questions Kids Have About Sex (co-authored with Lyndall Caldwell)
- The Listeners Get Two Homes
- The Listeners Go to a Family Centre
- The Listeners Go to Counselling
- The Listeners Get a Parenting Plan
- The Listeners Go to the Contact Centre
- The Listeners Change Homes

== See also ==
- Hurdling
- List of Australian athletics champions (Women)
- Athletics at the 1976 Summer Olympics
