= Katherine Mitchell =

American artist (born 1944)

Katherine Mitchell (born 1944) is an American artist, best known for her abstract painting.

== Education ==
Katherine Mitchell was born in Memphis, Tennessee, in 1944. She received her artist education in Atlanta, Georgia, first at the Atlanta College of Art, where she received a BFA degree (1968), then at Georgia State University, where she received an MFA degree (1977). She also attended the Tyler School of Art in Rome in 1968. She spent her career in Atlanta, where she continues to reside.

== Painting career ==
A proponent of minimalism, Mitchell's geometric drawings and paintings are meditative and seek to provide the viewer with a spiritual experience. She has participated in over 100 group and twenty solo exhibitions including those at the Museum of Contemporary Art of Georgia, Atlanta Contemporary Art Center, Galerie Stil und Bruch, Berlin, Germany and the Factory, Kunsthalle, Krems, Austria. She lectured in drawing and painting at Emory University from 1980 until her retirement in 2009. Mitchell's Variations on a Theme of Modules (1995-2000), is a mural made of 15,000 square feet of ceramic tile in the Sandy Springs station of the Metropolitan Atlanta Rapid Transit Authority (MARTA). Embedded in the walls of the underground station, the geometric tesserae create visual columns upon the station's structural columns. Her artwork often makes use of an architectural vocabulary to explore psychological space, depicting vaults, stairs, and ziggurats in her paintings and drawings.

Mitchell works abstractly in drawing and painting in various media, and has exhibited in museums and galleries, both nationally and abroad, including The American Academy and Institute of Arts & Letters in New York, 1979, and the National Museum of Women in the Arts in Washington, D. C., 1996.

== Personal life ==
Mitchell married Edward Ross, a fellow painter, who also served as Mitchell's teacher. Ross died in 1976.
