= Penny Gillies =

Australian hurdler (1951–2026)

Penny Gillies OAM

Personal information
- Nationality: Australian
- Born: Penelope Elizabeth McCallum; 20 July 1951 Sydney, Australia
- Died: 10 September 2026 (aged 75) Sydney, Australia

Sport
- Sport: Track and field
- Event: 100 metres hurdles

Penelope Elizabeth Gillies (née McCallum; 20 July 1951 – 10 September 2026) was an Australian hurdler. She represented Australia at multiple international events, and won a silver medal at the 1969 Pacific Conference Games. She competed in the 100 metres hurdles and pentathlon at the 1970 British Commonwealth Games, the 100m hurdles and 4x100 relay at the 1972 Summer Olympics and the 100m hurdles at the 1980 Summer Olympics, where she was team captain. Gillies won five Australian National Championships in the 100-metre hurdles.

After retiring as an athlete, Gillies achieved "success at the highest levels" as a coach." She was awarded the Australian Sports Medal in 2000 for outstanding service as an athlete, coach and team official for more than 30 years. For the 2024 King's Birthday Honours, she received the Medal of the Order of Australia for service to athletics as a coach and competitor.

Gillies died on 10 September 2026, at the age of 75.
