= Tamsyn Manou =

Australian sprinter (born 1978)

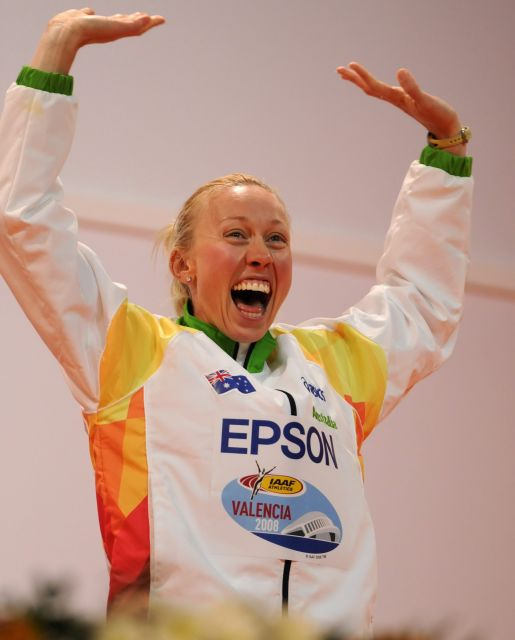

Medal record

Women's athletics

Representing Australia

World Indoor Championships
Gold medal – first place	Valencia 2008	800 metres
Silver medal – second place	Maebashi 1999	4 × 400 m relay

Commonwealth Games
Gold medal – first place	Kuala Lumpur 1998	4 × 400 m relay
Gold medal – first place	Manchester 2002	4 × 400 m relay
Gold medal – first place	Melbourne 2006	4 × 400 m relay

World Junior Championships
Bronze medal – third place	Sydney 1996	4 × 400 m relay

Tamsyn Carolyn Lewis (born 20 July 1978) is an Australian media personality and former track and field athlete who won a total of eighteen Australian Championships across the 400 metres, 800 metres and 400 m hurdles. She first represented Australia in 1994, and won the 800 metres in the 2008 World Indoor Championships. Lewis has been Australia's pre-eminent athletics expert commentator on television for the past decade replacing Melinda Gainsford-Taylor, including multiple Olympics and Commonwealth Games since 2016, working for the Seven, Nine and SBS networks.

== Personal life ==
Lewis was born and raised in Melbourne, Victoria and attended Methodist Ladies' College and Caulfield Grammar School. Her mother Carolyn Wright was a six-time national high jump champion, while her father, Greg Lewis, was a semi-finalist in the 200 metres at the Summer 1968 Olympics. She married Australian cricketer Graham Manou in 2011.

== Athletics career ==
Lewis emerged onto the national athletics scene in 1994, winning several events at the Australian Championships: the Under-16 100 m/200 m double and the Under-20 400 m. After these performances she was chosen, aged 15, for the 1994 Commonwealth Games as a 4 × 400 metres relay runner, though she did not eventually compete in the event. Her next international selection was for the 1996 World Junior Championships in Sydney, where she won a bronze medal as part of the Australian 4 × 400 metres relay team.

In 1998, Lewis moved up to the 800 metres, winning the National Championship and gaining a place in the 1998 Commonwealth Games team. Though she did not win a medal in the 800 metres, she contributed to Australia's gold medal winning 4 × 400 metres relay team. She next ran internationally in the 800 metres and 4 × 400 metres relay at the 1999 World Indoor Championships in Maebashi, where she set an Australian indoor record of 2:02.42 in her individual event and again won a medal as part of Australia's 4 × 400 metres relay team.

Leading up to the 2000 Sydney Summer Olympics, Lewis set new personal bests in the 400 and 800 metres to qualify for the Australian team. At the Olympics, she missed the Olympic final in the 800 metres by less than a tenth of a second, but ran in Australia's 4 × 400 metres relay team which set two national records.

In the following years, Lewis did not improve her personal best performances and gained a reputation as an underachiever in international competitions. She stopped running the 800 metres in 2005 to focus on the 400 metres and develop her speed. She competed only in the 400 metres at the 2006 Commonwealth Games, where she missed making the final, and in the 4 × 400 metres relay event, where she won her third successive gold medal amidst a major controversy, as part of the victorious Australian quartet.

In 2007 Lewis made a return to the 800 metres under new coach, and brother, Justin Lewis, winning the national championships, placing in several European Meetings and qualifying for the 2007 World Championships, where she finished fourth in her heat in 2:01.21 and again missed the final.

Lewis enjoyed a return to her best form in early 2008, remaining undefeated over 400 metres and 800 metres in Australia. She ran a personal best time of 51.44 to win the national 400 metres titles and comfortably retained her 800 metres crown. These performances earned Lewis selection in her third consecutive Australian Olympic team.

At the 2008 World Indoor Championships, held in Valencia, Spain, Lewis qualified for the final by running an Australian record of 2:01.85 in her heat. In a tactical final, Lewis broke away from perennial champion Maria de Lurdes Mutola and Ukrainian Tetiana Petlyuk to win the gold medal in a major upset. Lewis said "I was wondering what I was doing out there. Then I realised that I could win the race. This is amazing. I still can't believe it."

Lewis represented Australia at the 2008 Olympics in Beijing. Here she made the semi-final of the 800 metres and narrowly missed qualifying for the semi-final of the 400 metres.

At the 2009 Australian Championships, Lewis won both the 400 metres and the 400 m hurdles.

Over her athletics career, Lewis won a total of 18 national titles, and her coaches included Peter Fortune (Cathy Freeman's coach), Sebastian Coe and Daley Thompson.

=== Relay teams ===
Lewis won a number of international medals in the 4 × 400 m relay:

- At the 1996 World Junior Championships in Sydney, Lewis, Rosemary Hayward, Josephine Fowley and Jennifer Marshall won a bronze medal, recording a time of 3:32.47.
- At the 1999 World Indoor Championships in Maebashi, Lewis combined with Susan Andrews, Tania Van-Heer and Cathy Freeman to win a silver medal in an Australian record of 3:26.87.
- Lewis is also a three-time gold medal winner in the Commonwealth Games 4 × 400 m relay event.
- At Kuala Lumpur 1998, Lewis joined Lee Naylor, Tania Van-Heer and Susan Andrews to win in a time of 3:27.28.
- At Manchester 2002, Lewis ran the third leg in a team which featured Olympic 400 metres champion Cathy Freeman, Lauren Hewitt and, anchoring, 400 m hurdles champion Jana Pittman. Lewis leg saw Australia move from second into first place, and their time was a Games record 3:25.63.
- At Melbourne 2006, Lewis and her teammates Pittman, Caitlin Willis and Rosemary Hayward were second across the line being beaten by England; again Lewis had run the third leg. After consultation with her fellow runners, both Lewis and Pittman informed officials of a rule breach by England's Natasha Danvers (IAAF Rule 170 – Item 9), which the officials had already noted. England was subsequently disqualified and Australia awarded the gold medal; the time 3:28.66. Afterwards, Australian track legend Ron Clarke called on the Australian team to return their gold medal.

== Media career ==
Lewis began her media career with Melbourne radio station Triple M, as part of the 'Dead Set Legends' crew, in 2005.

In 2006, she appeared on the Australian television series Dancing with the Stars. Partnered by Arsen Kishishian, Lewis finished third.

From December 2007, with Jules Lund and Ryan Shelton, Lewis presented the Summer Fling breakfast show across the Austereo Today Network.

Lewis joined the Seven Network coverage alongside Bruce McAvaney providing the expert technical analysis for the athletics track events starting with the 2016 Summer Olympics in Rio de Janeiro, the Gold Coast 2018 Commonwealth Games, the 2021 Summer Olympics in Tokyo, Birmingham 2022 Commonwealth Games, the Nine Network Paris 2024 Olympics with Gerard Whateley and Seven's Glasgow 2026 Commonwealth Games with McAvaney.

== Controversies ==
In 2004, Lewis posed in bikinis for Ralph magazine, prompting criticism from the media for losing focus on her preparation for the Athens Olympics. After Lewis failed to progress past the heats of her individual event, the 800 metres, she and her coaches defended the photoshoot saying it was undertaken in five hours on one day and was not to blame for her result.

In February 2006, Lewis and fellow Australian runner Jana Pittman were involved in a public feud after the Australian athletics trials for the 2006 Commonwealth Games. Pittman, in answer to a media question following her heat win, had stated she had "no competition" in Australia; Lewis responded "I was standing behind the blocks [for the final] going, 'I'll give you no competition, bitch.'" in a radio interview after she won the final with Pittman finishing last. The media later described their relationship as a "catfight" and a "bitchfight."

In the 29 May 2006 edition of Australian "Zoo Weekly" magazine, Lewis again posed in what Nova 100 afternoon DJ's described as "incredibly racy" lingerie. In the accompanying article, Lewis went into detail about her relationship with Jana Pittman and the furore caused over comments by Pittman that the team should all return their medals.

In the lead-up to the Beijing Olympics she stated she would be running against drug cheats: "I have no doubts that when I line up next week, I will look left and right and know the other girls aren't all clean".

== Statistics ==
=== Personal bests ===
Event	Time	Place	Date
400 m	51.42	Brisbane, Australia	20 March 2009
400 m hurdles	56.27	Brisbane, Australia	21 March 2009
800 m	1:59.21	Canberra, Australia	15 January 2000
800 m indoor	2:01.85	Valencia, Spain	7 March 2008

=== Australian Championships titles ===
Year	400 m	800 m	400 m Hurdles
1998	–	1	–
1999	–	1	–
2000	–	1	–
2001	–	1	–
2002	–	1	–
2003	–	1	–
2004	–	2 (1st Australian)	–
2005	1	–	–
2006	2 (1st Australian)	–	–
2007	1	1	–
2008	1	1	–
2009	1	–	1
2010	4 (3rd Australian)	–	2
2011	1	1	–
2012	-	1	–

=== Yearly progression ===
Year	400 m	800 m	400 m Hurdles
1993	54.84	–	–
1994	52.90	–	–
1995	53.01	–	–
1996	53.34	–	–
1997	–	–	–
1998	52.60	2:01.71	–
1999	52.58	2:00.95	–
2000	51.51	1:59.21	–
2001	53.07	2:00.86	–
2002	52.21	1:59.73	–
2003	52.85	1:59.35	–
2004	53.72	2:00.96	–
2005	52.44	2:11.37	–
2006	52.36	2:06.52	–
2007	51.71	1:59.37	–
2008	51.44	1:59.43	–
2009	51.42	–	56.27

== See also ==
- List of Caulfield Grammar School people

Preceded by Toby Allen & Leanne Bampton	Dancing with the Stars (Australia) third place contestant Season 5 (Late 2006 with Arsen Kishishian)	Succeeded by Tim Campbell & Natalie Lowe
