= Jane Flemming =

Australian former Olympic track and field athlete

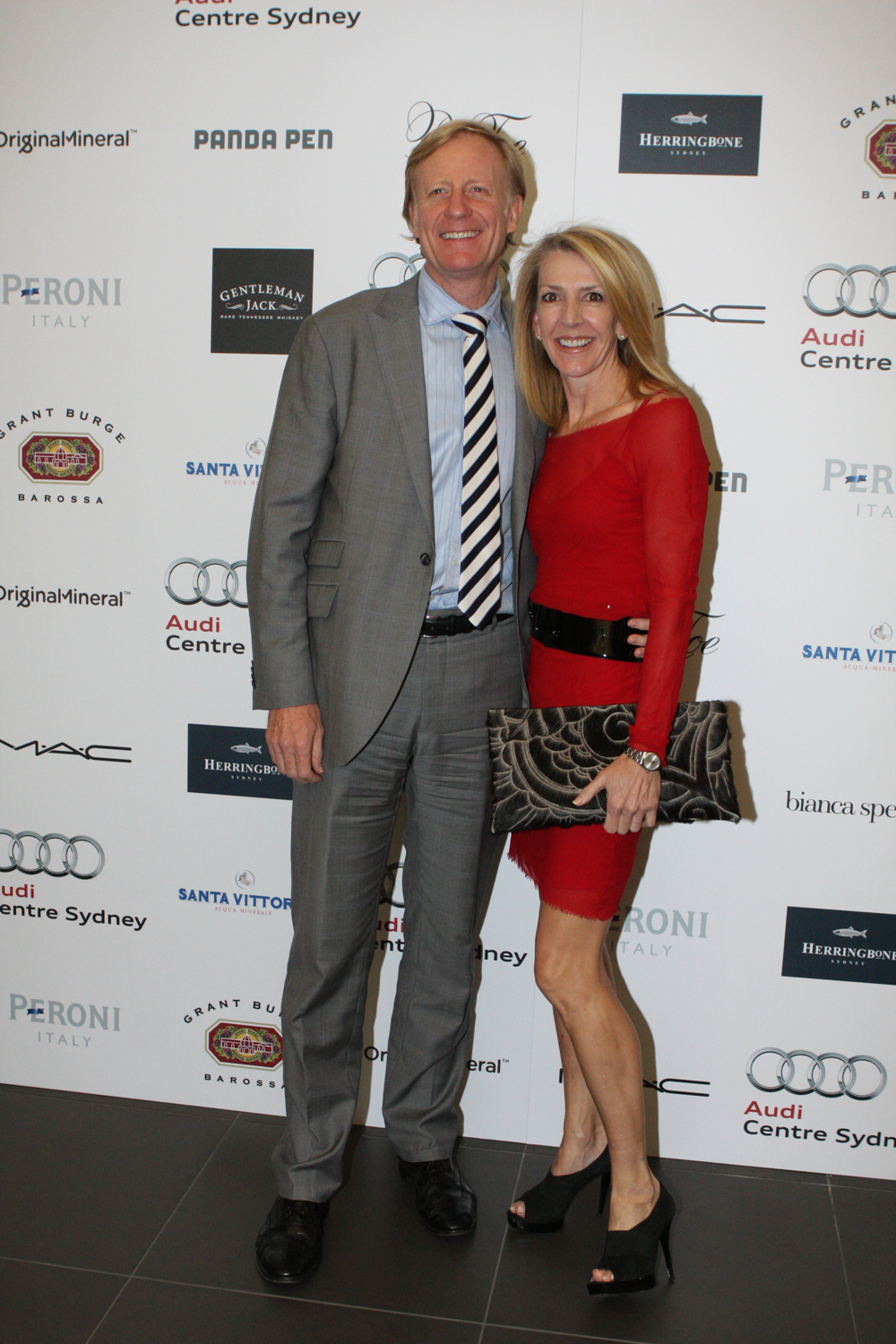

Personal information
- Born: 14 April 1965 (age 61) Horsham, Australia
Medal record
Women's Athletics
Representing Australia
Commonwealth Games
Gold medal – first place	1990 Auckland	Heptathlon
Gold medal – first place	1990 Auckland	Long Jump
Silver medal – second place	1986 Edinburgh	Heptathlon
Silver medal – second place	1994 Victoria	Heptathlon
Summer Universiade
Bronze medal – third place	1989 Duisburg	Heptathlon

Jane Christina Flemming OAM (born 14 April 1965) is an Australian former Olympic track and field athlete. She completed her HSC in 1982 at Mater Christi College, Belgrave. She was the 1990 Commonwealth Games champion at heptathlon and long jump and also represented Australia internationally at 100 m hurdles.

== Athletics career ==
Flemming started her athletics career competing for the Fairpark Little Athletics Club at the Knox Little Athletics Centre.

In Australian National Championships, she won thirteen open titles at heptathlon (5), 100 m hurdles (5), 100 m (2) and 100 y (1) events. She was named the Australian female athlete of the year in 1993.

A two-time Olympian, she also competed at the 1986, 1990 and 1994 Commonwealth Games. Her highest score in the heptathlon - 6695 points - set winning the 1990 Commonwealth gold medal still stands as the Australian and Commonwealth Games record at February 2016.

Flemming's individual performances during this competition were:

- 100 m hurdles - 13.21 (+1.4 m/s)
- high jump - 1.82 m
- shot put - 13.76 m
- 200 m - 23.62 (+2.4 m/s)
- long jump - 6.57 m (+1.6 m/s)
- javelin throw - 49.28 m
- 800 m - 2:12.53

In Auckland, Flemming also won the long jump gold medal, with a career best of 6.78 m.

Her best performance at the Olympic Games was 7th in Seoul 1988. Flemming also placed 7th at the 1993 World Athletics Championships.

At the Ulster Games in Belfast on 30 June 1986 Flemming, on request of Australian team manager Maurie Plant, provided a urine sample to allow another athlete, Sue Howland, to use Flemming's urine to pass a drug test. The Australian Senate report into drugs in sport (known as the "Black" report after Senator John Black) later gave Jane Flemming an official warning, and also banned Maurie Plant from managing any athletes in the future.

== Post-athletics career ==
After retiring from international competition, Flemming has worked as an athletics commentator in Australia for the Seven Network and SBS Television. She has also represented British Olympians Sebastian Coe and Daley Thompson, USA Olympian Michael Johnson and other athletes as a business manager, working in both Australia and Great Britain.

In 2006, Flemming was a commentator on Nine Network's coverage of the 2006 Commonwealth Games, and also appeared on a celebrity special of Temptation.

Awarded the Order of Australia on 26 January 2014 for services to athletics and to the community.

in 2013, Flemming helped Live Life Get Active, a private social initiative that offers free health, fitness and nutritional education online and in local parks around Australia with the help of local governments and corporations.

== Personal life ==
Flemming is married to Ian Purchas and has twin boys, James and Samuel.
