= Brenda Matthews =

New Zealand hurdler and sprinter

Brenda Patricia Matthews (born 19 February 1949, in Auckland) is a former female track and field sprinter and hurdler from New Zealand. She represented her native country at the 1972 Summer Olympics in Munich, West Germany.
