= Katrina Gibbs =

Australian high jumper

Medal record

Women's Athletics

Representing Australia

Commonwealth Games
Gold medal – first place	1978 Edmonton	High Jump

Katrina Gibbs (born 7 April 1959 in Hay, New South Wales) is a retired Australian track and field athlete, who specialised in the High Jump. She married fellow nationally ranked High Jumper, David Morrow (Retired).

Gibbs won two Australian High Jump national championships - in 1978 and 1982. In both years, she was duly selected in Australia's Commonwealth Games team.

In the 1978 Edmonton Games Gibbs achieved her career highlight, winning the High Jump in an Australian and Commonwealth record of 1.93m and defeating local Canadian favourite Debbie Brill. This also gave her the Australian Junior Record, which stood for 35 years until being bettered in 2013.

As a result of this achievement she was ranked seventh in the world by Track and Field News magazine.

A trained school teacher, Gibbs currently teaches at Eastwood Public School in Sydney.

Along with David Morrow, Gibbs coached High Jump with the Sydney Boys High School Athletics team for 9 years from 2006 to 2015. She has been an active athletics official since 2013 at State, National and Oceania level, including officiating at the 2018 Commonwealth Games on the Gold Coast.
