= Pam Matthews =

Australian javelin thrower

Personal information
- Full name: Pamela Marry Matthews
- Nationality: Australian
- Born: 8 February 1958 (age 68)

Sport
- Sport: Athletics/Powerlifting
- Event: Javelin throw

Pamela 'Pam' Matthews (born 8 February 1958) is an Australian athlete. She competed in the women's javelin throw at the 1980 Summer Olympics.
