= Edith Robinson =

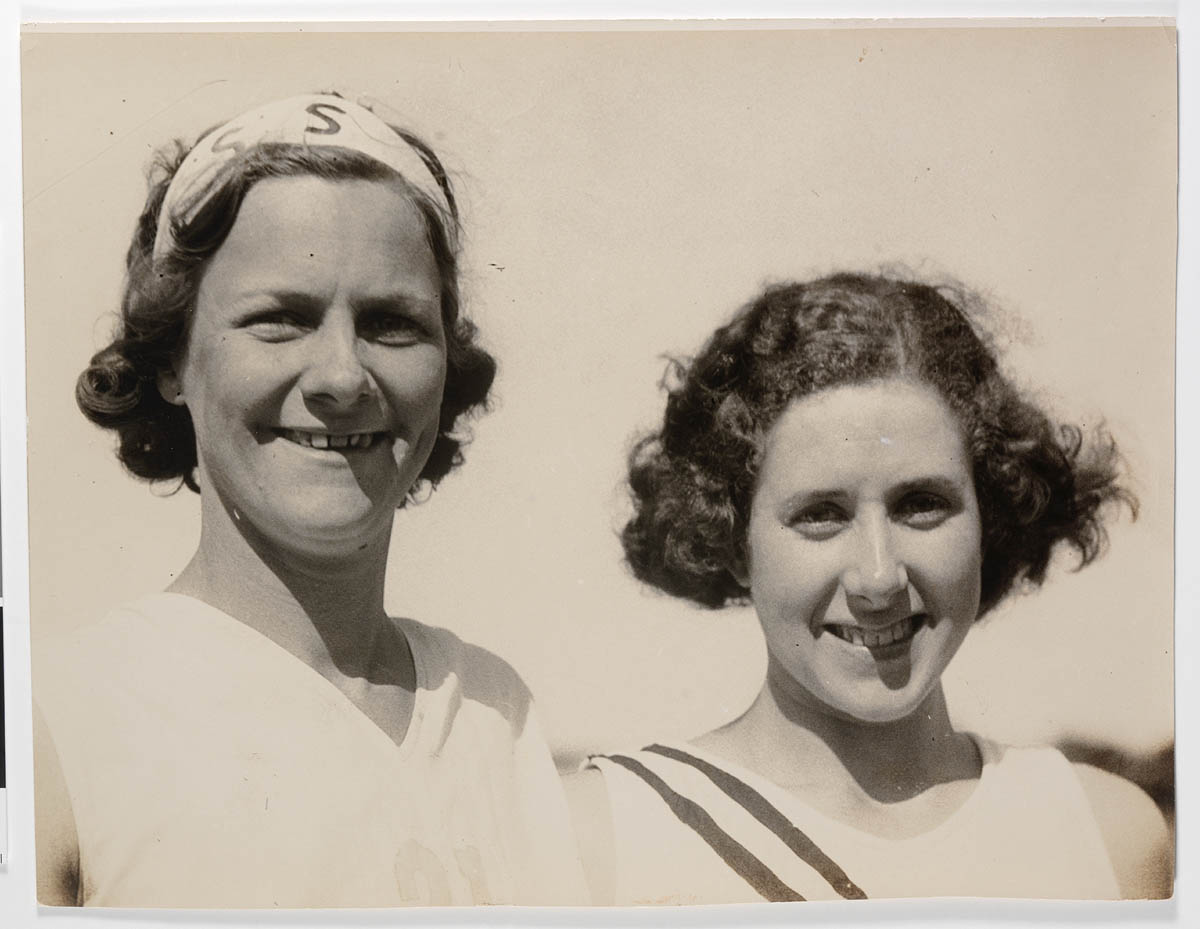
Australia's first female Olympic sprinters: Edith Robinson (left) and Eileen Wearne

Edith Frances "Edie" Robinson (26 February 1906 – 7 October 2000) was an Australian sprinter who was the first Australian female track and field athlete to compete at an Olympic Games.

In the 1928 Amsterdam Games, the first to feature women's athletics events, Robinson was run out in the semi-finals of the 100 metres and the heats of the 800 metres. Though Robinson had never before competed in an 800m race, she was urged to run by her male Olympic colleagues.

Later, Robinson won Australian Championships over 100 yards (1935) and 220 yards (1933/1935/1936), but never again represented Australia. In 1934, she unofficially tied the world record for 100 yards of 11.0 seconds and, through her career, set Australian records from 100 to 440 yards.

During the Sydney 2000 Olympic Games, as Australia's oldest living Olympian, Robinson was awarded the honour of officially opening the Olympic Village. She died on 7 October 2000, six days after the end of the Games .
