= Margaret Woodlock =

Australian shot putter

Personal information
- Nationality: Australian
- Born: Margaret Joy Woodlock; 20 May 1938 (age 88)

Sport
- Sport: Athletics
- Event: Shot put

Margaret Joy "Marg" Woodlock McLean OAM (born 20 May 1938) is an Australian athlete. She competed in the women's shot put at the 1956 Summer Olympics.

== Professional career ==
She was Australian shot put champion for six years between 1957 and 1962, and Victorian champion in shot put and javelin between 1956 and 1960.

In the 1990s and early 2000s she competed in Masters Games, winning gold, silver and bronze medals in shot put, discus and javelin at Melbourne and Brisbane.

She was a Gold Medallist in shot put at the World Masters Games in Melbourne in 2002.

== Personal Life ==
She has two children, James McLean and Melbourne actor and filmmaker, Sally McLean.

== Awards ==
She was awarded a Medal of the Order of Australia (OAM) for service to masters sport, and the community in the 2017 Queens Birthday Honours List.

St Catherine's School, where she was School Captain in 1956, honours her legacy with the Margaret Woodlock Award for Outstanding Sporting Achievement, an occasional award presented to exceptional Year 12 student-athletes.
