= Jacqueline Perkins (runner) =

Australian long-distance runner

Personal information
- Nationality: Australian
- Born: 29 August 1965 (age 60)

Sport
- Sport: Long-distance running
- Events: 3000 metres 10,000 metres

Jacqueline Perkins (born 29 August 1965) is an Australian long-distance runner. She competed in the women's 3000 metres and the women's 10,000 metres at the 1988 Summer Olympics.
