= Lynette Foreman =

Australian hurdler

- Born: Lynette May Young; March 5, 1957 (age 68)
- Occupations: Hurdler, athletics coach
- Spouse: Wally Foreman (deceased)
- Awards: Order of Australia (2018); Australian Sports Medal (2000)

Lynette May "Lyn" Foreman OAM (née Young; born 5 March 1957) is a former champion hurdler who competed for Western Australia and Australia from 1979 to 1982. She was the national 400m hurdles champion three times between 1979 and 1981.

In the IAAF World Championships event in 1980, Young-Foreman made the final of the 400m hurdles, finishing 7th with continuing good form for the next two seasons. At the 1982 Commonwealth Games, she ran as the nominal favourite but was beaten by rising star Debbie Flintoff, who set a personal best and new Commonwealth Record to win a gold medal at her international debut.

Forman qualified for the 800m in the 1988 Summer Olympics in Seoul and in 2000 was awarded the Australian Sports Medal for "Outstanding service as an international athlete and since as a coach and team official".

Currently she is an elite Level 5 coach and the head track coach at the Western Australian Institute of Sport.

Foreman received the Medal of the Order of Australia (OAM) in the 2018 Queen's Birthday Honours for service to athletics.

Foreman was married to ABC commentator and sports administrator Wally Foreman until his death in 2006. They have two children.
