= Erica Hooker =

Australian long jumper and pentathlete

Medal record

Women's athletics

Representing Australia

Commonwealth Games
Silver medal – second place	1978 Edmonton	Long Jump

Erica Hooker (née Nixon; born 15 December 1953) is a retired Australian athlete who was best known as a long jumper and pentathlete.

She competed for Australia at one Olympic Games and two Commonwealth Games, winning a silver medal at the 1978 Commonwealth Games in Edmonton.

Erica won 4 National Long Jump titles, from 1973-76. Also she won 5 Heptathlon Australian titles as well.

Nixon married Australian 800 metres runner Bill Hooker in the mid 1970s. Their son Steven Hooker has become a highly regarded pole vaulter.

== See also ==
- List of Australian athletics champions (women)
