= Carolyn Wright =

Australian high jumper

Carolyn Jean Lewis (née Wright; born 16 January 1946) is an Australian former athlete who competed in the high jump.

She competed for the Novacastrians club in Newcastle and the Ryde Athletics Club in Sydney. Upon marriage she moved to Melbourne where she competed for the Coburg Athletics Club alongside athletes such as Raelene Boyle and Jean Roberts.

At the age of 16, Wright was selected to compete in the 1962 British Empire and Commonwealth Games in Perth where she placed sixth. Through her career, she won six Australian Championships and had a personal best of 1.74 metres, set in 1962.

In 1972, Wright married Olympic sprinter Greg Lewis. Their daughter Tamsyn is a three-time Olympian, specialising in the 800 metres, who has won three Commonwealth Games Relay Gold Medals and a World Indoor 800m gold medal in athletics.
