= Jenny Orr =

Australian middle-distance runner

- Orr at the 1972 Olympics

Personal information
- Born: 21 January 1953 (age 73)
- Height: 172 cm (5 ft 8 in)
- Weight: 54 kg (119 lb)

Sport
- Sport: Athletics
- Events: 800 m, 1500 m
- Club: Ringwood AC, Victoria

Achievements and titles
- Personal bests: 800 m – 2:04.5 (1972); 1500 m – 4:08.06 (1972)

Jennifer Louise Orr (later McConnell, later Frank, born 21 January 1953) is a retired Australian middle-distance runner. She competed in the 800 m and 1500 m events at the 1972 Summer Olympics and placed eighth over 1500 m. Her son Daniel McConnell became an Olympic mountain biker.
