= Peter Gandy (athlete) =

Australian sprinter

Peter Gandy (born 2 September 1961) Wollongong, New South Wales, Australia, is a former Australian sprinter who competed in the 100 metres and 200 metres.

He was Australian Junior Champion in the 100 and 200, then in 1980 still only 18 in the Sun/KB Games at the Sydney Athletics Field he raced against an international field in the 100, including Allan Wells UK, Clancy Edwards USA, Ernest Obeng, Ghana and Trevor Hoyte UK, Gandy finished 2nd, only beaten by Wells, but got the biggest cheer of the day.

1981 he then competed at the Pacific Conference Games in Christchurch, New Zealand where he won 2 Gold Medals in the 100m and 200m, he also added a Silver medal in the 4 × 100 m for the Australian relay team.

Gandy still in New Zealand, and again faced Allan Wells in both sprints, finishing 2nd again.

In 1981, Gandy clocked 9.73 in the 100 yards.

He then was Australian 100m champion, and also clocked a manual 20.3 in the 200 in Hobart, Tasmania, which is still Tasmanian hand time record to present.

In 1982 he won the Australian 200 metres title, and finished 2nd in the 100 metres to Paul Narracott.

He then competed at the 1982 Commonwealth Games in Brisbane where he reached the semi-finals of the 100 metres, but was a member of the sprint relay team that finished 4th in the final.

Peter Gandys pbs 100y 9.73

100m 10.34

200m 20.66
