= Tony Benson (runner) =

Australian runner (born 1942)

Anthony Charles Benson (born 20 May 1942) is an Australian former long-distance runner who competed in the 1972 Summer Olympics.

As an athlete, Benson won the 1969 Pacific Conference Games 1500m, set Australian 2000m and 3000m records, ran a sub 4 minute mile and the world’s 8th fastest ever time for 3000m, recorded a world-best time of 27:37 for a road 10 kilometres, was ranked 5th in the world over 5000m, and represented Australia at the 1972 Munich Olympics.

Benson was a high school teacher during his athletic career but was later employed as the national coach of the Philippines (1979-1983) and Australia (1988-1993) teams. In addition, he has been the head coach for Asian Games (1983), Commonwealth Games (1990), World Championship (1991), and Olympic Games (1992) teams. He lectured for the International Association of Athletic Federation in Africa, Asia, and the Pacific between 1984 and 2004, co-authored a coaching book entitled "Run With The Best" with US Coach Irv Ray in 1998 and directed International Athletic Exchange (a sports travel company) and Benson’s Running & Triathlon (a coaching company) between 1986 and 2006.

Benson is currently involved with Run Out of Poverty, providing free coaching to students who are interested in running, from three elementary schools in the Ma-a District of Davao City. This gives them the opportunity to qualify for a university track and field scholarship.

In 1967, Benson married Raylene Marie (Nee Paull) who was born on 20 October 1946. They have three children: Jacqueline (b. 1968), Christopher (b. 1969), and Virginia (b.1971), and nine grandchildren: Sam, Mikala, Ben, Georgia, Aly, Amelda, Liam, Shae, and Imogen.
