= Petra Rivers =

Australian javelin thrower

Personal information
- Born: 11 December 1952 (age 73)
Medal record
Women's athletics
Representing Australia
Commonwealth Games
Gold medal – first place	1970 Edinburgh	Javelin
Gold medal – first place	1974 Christchurch	Javelin
Silver medal – second place	1982 Brisbane	Javelin

Petra Rivers (born 11 December 1952) is a retired Australian athlete who specialised in the javelin throw.

At the 1970 National Championships, she won both the Open and Junior javelin titles. Still only seventeen, it was her fourth national junior javelin championship win. Her performances earned her a place in the Australian team for the 1970 Commonwealth Games where she comfortably won the gold medal in Edinburgh.

In late 1971, she threw Australian and World Junior records of 61.76 and 62.24 metres, in quick succession but injury kept her out of the 1972 national titles and Olympic Games. She recovered to repeat her Commonwealth Games gold medal win in Auckland but continuing injuries forced her retirement from the sport, at age 22, in 1975.

Four years later, Rivers returned from retirement and gained Olympic selection for the 1980 Moscow Olympics. She won the 1982 national championships with a huge national record throw of 69.28 metres and took the silver medal at the Brisbane Commonwealth Games behind team-mate Sue Howland.

Rivers went on to compete in the 1984 LA Olympics and 1986 Commonwealth Games.

== See also ==
- Australian athletics champions (Women)
