= Lyn Jacenko =

Australian long jumper (born 1953)

Medal record

Women's athletics

Representing Australia

IAAF World Cup
Gold medal – first place	1977 Düsseldorf	Long Jump

Commonwealth Games
Bronze medal – third place	1978 Edmonton	4 x 100 m relay

Lynette "Lyn" Jacenko (née Tillett) (born 15 August 1953) is a retired Australian long jumper.

A star junior champion in high jump, long jump, sprints and hurdles, she was selected to represent Australia in the 1972 Summer Olympics in long jump and pentathlon at age 18. Just prior to the Games in Munich, she jumped an Australian and Under 20 long jump record of 6.60 metres, but could not qualify for the finals of the Olympic event.

In 1977, she won the inaugural World Cup event and was ranked in the top ten in the world.

She represented Australia at the 1974 Auckland and 1978 Edmonton Commonwealth Games.

== See also ==
- Australian athletics champions (Women)
