= Cheryl Peasley =

Australian athletics competitor

Personal information
- Nationality: Australian
- Born: 5 January 1951 (age 75)

Sport
- Sport: Sprinting
- Event: 4 × 400 metres relay
Medal record
Women's athletics
Representing Australia
Commonwealth Games
Bronze medal – third place	1970 Edinburgh	800 m

Cheryl Peasley (born 5 January 1951) is an Australian sprinter. She competed in the women's 4 × 400 metres relay at the 1972 Summer Olympics.
