= Taketsugu Saruwatari =

Japanese middle-distance runner

Taketsugu Saruwatari (猿渡 武嗣, Saruwatari Taketsugu; born 23 December 1942) is a Japanese former middle distance runner who competed in the 1964 Summer Olympics and in the 1968 Summer Olympics.
