= Pacific Conference Games =

The Pacific Conference Games were a quadrennial athletics competition, held between 1969 and 1985 and contested by Australia, Canada, Japan, New Zealand and the United States. Each of the five nations hosted an edition of the competition before its dissolution in 1985. The 1981 and 1985 events were open to athletes from all nations.

The event was proposed at the 1967 Summer Universiade in a specially scheduled meeting by Japanese national sports officials to their counterparts for the four other developed, Western nations with Pacific coasts. The intention was to hold a high level, two-day international track and field competition one year after each Summer Olympic Games. It was suggested in contemporary reports that the limited invitational format was designed to exclude the Soviet Union (which had boycotted the Tokyo Summer Universiade.

The idea of a Pacific region sports competition was revived at the Pacific Ocean Games and an athletics competition featured at the sole edition in 1995. The games were abandoned after their first edition, however.

== Editions ==
Games	Year	Dates	Host stadium	Host city	Host country	Events
I	1969	26–27 September	National Olympic Stadium	Tokyo	Japan	32
II	1973	27–28 June	Centennial Park Stadium	Toronto	Canada	32
III	1977	3–4 December	Bruce Stadium	Canberra	Australia	34
IV	1981	31 January–1 February	Queen Elizabeth II Park	Christchurch	New Zealand	37
V	1985	22–23 June	Edwards Stadium	Berkeley, California	United States	37
