= List of Canadian Track and Field Championships winners =

The Canadian Track and Field Championships (French: Championnats Canadiens d'Athlétisme) is an annual outdoor track and field competition organised by Athletics Canada, which serves as the Canadian national championship for the sport. The competition was first held in 1884 as a men's only event, with women's events being introduced in 1925. The event is typically reserved for Canadian nationals, though foreign athletes have entered (and won) as invited guests. The vast majority of foreign winners have come from either Great Britain or the United States.

== Men ==
=== 100 metres ===
Prior to 1967, the event was variously held over 100 metres or 100 yards.

- 1946: ?
- 1947: Roger Wellman
- 1948: Jack Parry
- 1949: Don Pettie
- 1950: Ted Haggis
- 1951: Raphael Duke
- 1952: Don McFarlane
- 1953: Don McFarlane
- 1954: James Gathers (USA)
- 1955: Joe Foreman
- 1956: Stan Levenson
- 1957: Adrian Metcalfe (GBR)
- 1958: Mike Agostini (TRI)
- 1959: Harry Jerome
- 1960: Harry Jerome
- 1961: Robert Fisher-Smith
- 1962: Harry Jerome
- 1963: Larry Dunn
- 1964: Harry Jerome
- 1965: Ed Hearne
- 1966: Harry Jerome
- 1967: Ed Hearne
- 1968: Harry Jerome
- 1969: Harry Jerome
- 1970: Charlie Francis
- 1971: Charlie Francis
- 1972: Herman Carter
- 1973: Charlie Francis
- 1974: Hugh Fraser
- 1975: Hugh Fraser
- 1976: Cole Doty
- 1977: Hugh Fraser
- 1978: Hugh Fraser
- 1979: Desai Williams
- 1980: Desai Williams
- 1981: Desai Williams
- 1982: Tony Sharpe
- 1983: Desai Williams
- 1984: Ben Johnson
- 1985: Ben Johnson
- 1986: Ben Johnson
- 1987: Ben Johnson
- 1988: Ben Johnson
- 1989: Bruny Surin
- 1990: Bruny Surin
- 1991: Bruny Surin
- 1992: Glenroy Gilbert
- 1993: Atlee Mahorn
- 1994: Glenroy Gilbert
- 1995: Donovan Bailey
- 1996: Robert Esmie
- 1997: Donovan Bailey
- 1998: Bruny Surin
- 1999: Bruny Surin
- 2000: Bruny Surin
- 2001: Donovan Bailey
- 2002: Nicolas Macrozonaris
- 2003: Nicolas Macrozonaris
- 2004: Pierre Browne
- 2005: Pierre Browne
- 2006: Nicolas Macrozonaris
- 2007: Nicolas Macrozonaris
- 2008: Pierre Browne
- 2009: Bryan Barnett
- 2010: Sam Effah
- 2011: Sam Effah
- 2012: Justyn Warner
- 2013: Aaron Brown
- 2014: Gavin Smellie
- 2015: Andre De Grasse
- 2016: Andre De Grasse
- 2017: Andre De Grasse
- 2018: Aaron Brown
- 2019: Aaron Brown
- 2020: Not held
- 2021: Aaron Brown
- 2022: Aaron Brown
- 2023: Aaron Brown
- 2024: Andre De Grasse
- 2025: Duan Asemota
- 2026: Andre De Grasse

=== 200 metres ===
Prior to 1967, the event was variously held over 200 metres or 220 yards.

- 1946: Don McFarlane
- 1947: John Turner
- 1948: Jack Parry
- 1949: Don Pettie
- 1950: Ted Haggis
- 1951: Robert Hutchison
- 1952: Peter Sutton
- 1953: Bruce Springbett
- 1954: Art Bragg (USA)
- 1955: Joe Foreman
- 1956: Stan Levenson
- 1957: Laird Sloan
- 1958: Stan Levenson
- 1959: Harry Jerome
- 1960: Harry Jerome
- 1961: Adrian Metcalfe (GBR)
- 1962: Harry Jerome
- 1963: Larry Dunn
- 1964: Harry Jerome
- 1965: Jeffrey Archer (GBR)
- 1966: Harry Jerome
- 1967: Don Domansky
- 1968: Harry Jerome
- 1969: Tony Powell
- 1970: Charlie Francis
- 1971: Charlie Francis
- 1972: Robert Martin
- 1973: Robert Martin
- 1974: Robert Martin
- 1975: Hugh Fraser
- 1976: Dacre Brown
- 1977: Desai Williams
- 1978: Dan Biocchi
- 1979: Desai Williams
- 1980: Desai Williams
- 1981: Desai Williams
- 1982: Desai Williams
- 1983: Desai Williams
- 1984: Tony Sharpe
- 1985: Ben Johnson
- 1986: Atlee Mahorn
- 1987: Ben Johnson
- 1988: Cyprian Enweani
- 1989: Cyprian Enweani
- 1990: Bradley McCuaig
- 1991: Atlee Mahorn
- 1992: Ricardo Greenidge
- 1993: Glenroy Gilbert
- 1994: Robert Esmie
- 1995: Atlee Mahorn
- 1996: Dave Tomlin
- 1997: Robert Esmie
- 1998: O'Brian Gibbons
- 1999: Glenn Smith
- 2000: Pierre Browne
- 2001: Shane Niemi
- 2002: Jermaine Joseph
- 2003: Nicolas Macrozonaris
- 2004: Anson Henry
- 2005: Anson Henry
- 2006: Bryan Barnett
- 2007: Bryan Barnett
- 2008: Jared Connaughton
- 2009: Bryan Barnett
- 2010: Jared Connaughton
- 2011: Bryan Barnett
- 2012: Tremaine Harris
- 2013: Tremaine Harris
- 2014: Brendon Rodney
- 2015: Aaron Brown
- 2016: Brendon Rodney
- 2017: Andre De Grasse
- 2018: Aaron Brown
- 2019: Aaron Brown
- 2020: Not held
- 2021: Aaron Brown
- 2022: Aaron Brown
- 2023: Andre De Grasse
- 2024: Aaron Brown
- 2025: Jerome Blake
- 2026: Aaron Brown

=== 400 metres ===
Prior to 1967, the event was variously held over 400 metres or 440 yards.

- 1946: Ernie McCullough
- 1947: Paul Chinette
- 1948: Bob McFarlane
- 1949: Ezra Henniger
- 1950: Bob McFarlane
- 1951: Jack Hutchins
- 1952: Jim Lavery
- 1953: Murray Cockburn
- 1954: Reggie Pearman (USA)
- 1955: Dick Harding
- 1956: Terry Tobacco
- 1957: Laird Sloan
- 1958: Terry Tobacco
- 1959: Stan Worsfold
- 1960: Terry Tobacco
- 1961: Bill Crothers
- 1962: Bill Crothers
- 1963: Sig Ohleman
- 1964: Don McGarten
- 1965: Bill Crothers
- 1966: Ross MacKenzie
- 1967: Don Domansky
- 1968: Don Domansky
- 1969: Tony Powell
- 1970: Tony Powell
- 1971: Leighton Hope
- 1972: Craig Blackman
- 1973: Glenn Bogue
- 1974: Randy Jackson
- 1975: Brian Saunders
- 1976: Vic Remple
- 1977: Frank Van Doorn
- 1978: Brian Saunders
- 1979: Brian Saunders
- 1980: Peter Harper
- 1981: Tim Bethune
- 1982: Doug Hinds
- 1983: Brian Saunders
- 1984: Doug Hinds
- 1985: Andre Smith
- 1986: John Graham
- 1987: Anton Skerritt
- 1988: Carl Folkes
- 1989: Anton Skerritt
- 1990: Mike McLean
- 1991: Anthony Wilson
- 1992: Rayton Archer
- 1993: Troy Jackson
- 1994: Byron Goodwin
- 1995: Charles Allen
- 1996: Christopher Semenuk
- 1997: Alexandre Marchand
- 1998: Shane Niemi
- 1999: Shane Niemi
- 2000: Shane Niemi
- 2001: Shane Niemi
- 2002: Shane Niemi
- 2003: Shane Niemi
- 2004: Tyler Christopher
- 2005: Nathan Vadeboncoeur
- 2006: Tyler Christopher
- 2007: Tyler Christopher
- 2008: Tyler Christopher
- 2009: Nathan Vadeboncoeur
- 2010: Daniel Harper
- 2011: Tremaine Harris
- 2012: Daundre Barnaby
- 2013: Philip Osei
- 2014: Daundre Barnaby
- 2015: Philip Osei

=== 800 metres ===
Prior to 1967, the event was variously held over 800 metres or 880 yards.

- 1946: ?
- 1947: Jack Hutchins
- 1948: Jack Hutchins
- 1949: Bob McFarlane
- 1950: Bob McFarlane
- 1951: Bill Parnell
- 1952: John Ross
- 1953: Richard Carmichael
- 1954: Reggie Pearman (USA)
- 1955: Jack McRoberts
- 1956: Lyle Garbe
- 1957: Donald Gorrie (GBR)
- 1958: Joe Mullins
- 1959: Sig Ohleman
- 1960: Sig Ohleman
- 1961: Bill Crothers
- 1962: Bill Crothers
- 1963: Bill Crothers
- 1964: Bill Crothers
- 1965: Bill Crothers
- 1966: Bill Crothers
- 1967: Bill Crothers
- 1968: Lowell Paul (USA)
- 1969: Ergas Leps
- 1970: Ergas Leps
- 1971: Kenneth Elmer
- 1972: Bill Smart
- 1973: Randy Makolosky
- 1974: John Craig
- 1975: Kenneth Elmer
- 1976: Tom Griffin
- 1977: Bob Reindl
- 1978: Peter Favell
- 1979: Allan Godfrey
- 1980: Bruce Roberts
- 1981: Doug Wournell
- 1982: Cornell Messam
- 1983: Simon Hoogewerf
- 1984: Bruce Roberts
- 1985: Simon Hoogewerf
- 1986: Simon Hoogewerf
- 1987: Simon Hoogewerf
- 1988: Simon Hoogewerf
- 1989: Freddie Williams
- 1990: Mike McLean
- 1991: Freddie Williams
- 1992: Sasha Smiljanic
- 1993: Freddie Williams
- 1994: Freddie Williams
- 1995: William Best
- 1996: Freddie Williams
- 1997: Zach Whitmarsh
- 1998: Zach Whitmarsh
- 1999: Zach Whitmarsh
- 2000: Zach Whitmarsh
- 2001: Achraf Tadili
- 2002: Zach Whitmarsh
- 2003: Gary Reed
- 2004: Gary Reed
- 2005: Gary Reed
- 2006: Nathan Vadeboncoeur
- 2007: Gary Reed
- 2008: Gary Reed
- 2009: Gary Reed

=== 1500 metres ===
Prior to 1967, the event was variously held over 1500 metres or one mile.

- 1946: ?
- 1947: Cliff Salmond
- 1948: Bill Parnell
- 1949: Jack Hutchins
- 1950: John Ross
- 1951: Bill Parnell
- 1952: John Ross
- 1953: Selwyn Jones
- 1954: Rich Ferguson
- 1955: L. Weiss
- 1956: John Moule
- 1957: Donald Gorrie (GBR)
- 1958: Ed Morton
- 1959: Randy Mason
- 1960: Geoff Eales
- 1961: John Boulter (GBR)
- 1962: Jim Irons
- 1963: Ergas Leps
- 1964: Ergas Leps
- 1965: Ergas Leps
- 1966: Ergas Leps
- 1967: Dave Bailey
- 1968: Norm Trerise
- 1969: Norm Trerise
- 1970: Ergas Leps
- 1971: Ergas Leps
- 1972: Bill Smart
- 1973: Paul Craig
- 1974: Dave Hill
- 1975: Peter Spir
- 1976: Dave Weicker
- 1977: Paul Craig
- 1978: Paul Craig
- 1979: John Craig
- 1980: John Craig
- 1981: John Craig
- 1982: Peter Spir
- 1983: Dave Reid
- 1984: Paul Williams
- 1985: Dave Reid
- 1986: Dave Campbell
- 1987: Dave Campbell
- 1988: Dave Campbell
- 1989: Colin Mathieson
- 1990: Dan Bertoia
- 1991: Graham Hood
- 1992: Kevin Sullivan
- 1993: Kevin Sullivan
- 1994: Kevin Sullivan
- 1995: Kevin Sullivan
- 1996: Allan Klassen
- 1997: Graham Hood
- 1998: Allan Klassen
- 1999: Graham Hood
- 2000: Kevin Sullivan
- 2001: Graham Hood
- 2002: Ryan McKenzie
- 2003: Kevin Sullivan
- 2004: Kevin Sullivan
- 2005: Kevin Sullivan

=== 5000 metres ===
Prior to 1967, the event was variously held over 5000 metres or three miles.

- 1946: ?
- 1947: Adrien Pronovost
- 1948: Cliff Salmond
- 1949: Rich Ferguson
- 1950: Rich Ferguson
- 1951: Lyle Garbe
- 1952: Rich Ferguson
- 1953: Selwyn Jones
- 1954: Henry Kennedy
- 1955: Roland Michaud
- 1956: Ron Wallingford
- 1957: Doug Kyle
- 1958: Doug Kyle
- 1959: Doug Kyle
- 1960: Geoff Eales
- 1961: Bruce Kidd
- 1962: Bruce Kidd
- 1963: Jim Keefe (USA)
- 1964: Bruce Kidd
- 1965: Dave Ellis
- 1966: Ray Haswell
- 1967: Dave Ellis
- 1968: Bob Finlay
- 1969: Bob Finlay
- 1970: Jerome Drayton
- 1971: Ken French
- 1972: Grant McLaren
- 1973: Dan Shaughnessy
- 1974: John Sharp
- 1975: Grant McLaren
- 1976: Louis Groarke
- 1977: Paul Bannon
- 1978: Peter Butler
- 1979: Paul Williams
- 1980: Greg Duhaime
- 1981: Peter Butler
- 1982: Phil Laheurte
- 1983: Paul Williams
- 1984: Paul Williams
- 1985: Rob Lonergan
- 1986: Paul Williams
- 1987: Paul McCloy
- 1988: Paul Williams
- 1989: John Castellano
- 1990: Chris Weber
- 1991: Marc Oleson
- 1992: Phil Ellis
- 1993: Dave Reid
- 1994: Jeff Schiebler
- 1995: Jeff Schiebler
- 1996: Jason Bunston
- 1997: Jeff Schiebler
- 1998: Jeff Schiebler
- 1999: Jeff Schiebler
- 2000: Sean Kaley
- 2001: Jeremy Deere
- 2002: Sean Kaley
- 2003: Sean Kaley
- 2004: Reid Coolsaet
- 2005: Reid Coolsaet

=== 10,000 metres ===
Prior to 1967, the event was variously held over 10,000 metres, five miles or six miles.

- 1946: Walter Fedorick
- 1947: Ray Martin
- 1948: Don James
- 1949: Walter Fedorick
- 1950: Selwyn Jones
- 1951: Lyall Sundberg
- 1952: Lyle Garbe
- 1953: Selwyn Jones
- 1954: Selwyn Jones
- 1955: Roland Michaud
- 1956: Doug Kyle
- 1957: Doug Kyle
- 1958: Gordon Dickson
- 1959: Doug Kyle
- 1960: Doug Kyle
- 1961: Orville Atkins
- 1962: Bruce Kidd
- 1963: Dave Ellis
- 1964: Bruce Kidd
- 1965: Alasdair Heron (GBR)
- 1966: Dave Ellis
- 1967: Dave Ellis
- 1968: Jerome Drayton
- 1969: Jerome Drayton
- 1970: Jerome Drayton
- 1971: Jerome Drayton
- 1972: Dan Shaughnessy
- 1973: Dan Shaughnessy
- 1974: Dan Shaughnessy
- 1975: Jerome Drayton
- 1976: Doug Scorrar
- 1977: Paul Bannon
- 1978: Jerome Drayton
- 1979: Roger Martindill
- 1980: Peter Butler
- 1981: Peter Butler
- 1982: Peter Butler
- 1983: Peter Butler
- 1984: Alain Bordeleau
- 1985: Paul McCloy
- 1986: Paul McCloy
- 1987: Peter Maher
- 1988: Art Boileau
- 1989: Paul McCloy
- 1990: Carey Nelson
- 1991: Carey Nelson
- 1992: Janik Lambert
- 1993: Dave Reid
- 1994: Brendan Matthias
- 1995: Bruce Deacon
- 1996: Jason Bunston
- 1997: Margarito Zamora (MEX)
- 1998: Steve Boyd
- 1999: Sean Kaley
- 2000: Jeff Schiebler
- 2001: Jeff Schiebler
- 2002: Jeff Schiebler
- 2003: Jeff Schiebler
- 2004: Jeff Schiebler
- 2005: Mark Bomba
- 2006: Scott Simpson

=== Half marathon ===
- 2004: Steve Osadiuk
- 2005: Mark Bomba

=== Marathon ===
The 1946 marathon was an unofficial event. The 1972 marathon course was overly long by one kilometre.

- 1946: Gérard Côté
- 1947: Albert Morton
- 1948: Gérard Côté
- 1949: Paul Collins
- 1950: Paul Collins
- 1951: Walter Fedorick
- 1952: Paul Collins
- 1953: Gérard Côté
- 1954: ?
- 1955: Gordon Dickson
- 1956: George Hillier
- 1957: Gordon Dickson
- 1958: Gordon Dickson
- 1959: Gordon Dickson
- 1960: Gordon Dickson
- 1961: Johnny J. Kelley (USA)
- 1962: Frederick Norris (GBR)
- 1963: Doug Kyle
- 1964: Gordon Dickson
- 1965: John Booras (USA)
- 1966: Andy Boychuk
- 1967: Andy Boychuk
- 1968: Andy Boychuk
- 1969: Chris Steer
- 1970: Andy Boychuk
- 1971: John Cliff
- 1972: Jerome Drayton
- 1973: Jerome Drayton
- 1974: Tom Howard
- 1975: Brian Maxwell
- 1976: Doug Scorrar
- 1977: Mike Dyon
- 1978: Rich Hughson
- 1979: Ken Inglis
- 1980: Brian Maxwell
- 1981: John Hill
- 1982: Mike Dyon
- 1983: Art Boileau
- 1984: Dave Edge
- 1985: Roger Schwegel
- 1986: Mike Dyon
- 1987: Mike Dyon
- 1988: Gordon Christie
- 1989: Peter Maher
- 1990: Ashley Dustow
- 1991: Michael Petrocci
- 1992: Not held
- 1993: Not held
- 1994: Not held
- 1995: Not held
- 1996: Not held
- 1997: Not held
- 1998: Not held
- 1999: Not held
- 2000: Bruce Deacon
- 2001: Bruce Deacon
- 2002: Bruce Deacon
- 2003: Not held
- 2004: Matthew McInnes
- 2005: Jim Finlayson
- 2006: Charles Bedley

=== 3000 metres steeplechase ===
- 1959: Ron Wallingford
- 1960: Ron Wallingford
- 1961: Heike Vanderwal
- 1962: Heike Vanderwal
- 1963: Pat Traynor (USA)
- 1964: John Valiant
- 1965: Heike Vanderwal
- 1966: Heike Vanderwal
- 1967: Heike Vanderwal
- 1968: Ray Varey
- 1969: Ray Varey
- 1970: Ray Varey
- 1971: Chris McCubbins
- 1972: Chris McCubbins
- 1973: Graham Hutchison
- 1974: Joe Sax
- 1975: Brian Stride
- 1976: Peter Spir
- 1977: Joe Sax
- 1978: Dean Child
- 1979: Phil Laheurte
- 1980: Greg Duhaime
- 1981: Greg Duhaime
- 1982: Greg Duhaime
- 1983: Marc Adam
- 1984: Greg Duhaime
- 1985: Graeme Fell
- 1986: Graeme Fell
- 1987: Graeme Fell
- 1988: Graeme Fell
- 1989: Graeme Fell
- 1990: Alain Boucher
- 1991: Zeba Crook
- 1992: Jeff Schiebler
- 1993: Graeme Fell
- 1994: Zeba Crook
- 1995: Graeme Fell
- 1996: Henry Klassen
- 1997: Joël Bourgeois
- 1998: Joël Bourgeois
- 1999: Joël Bourgeois
- 2000: Joël Bourgeois
- 2001: Joël Bourgeois
- 2002: Joël Bourgeois
- 2003: Matt Kerr
- 2004: David Milne
- 2005: Matt Kerr

=== 110 metres hurdles ===
Prior to 1967, the event was variously held over 110 metres or 120 yards.

- 1946: ?
- 1947: Jack Burke (USA)
- 1948: Kim Kimbark
- 1949: Gordon Crosby
- 1950: Gordon Crosby
- 1951: Pete Steward
- 1952: Gordon Crosby
- 1953: Gordon Crosby
- 1954: Norman Williams
- 1955: Norman Williams
- 1956: Peter Stanger
- 1957: Malcolm Ash (GBR)
- 1958: Peter Stanger
- 1959: Bob Meldrum
- 1960: Bob Meldrum
- 1961: Mike Parker (GBR)
- 1962: Bill Gairdner
- 1963: Bill Gairdner
- 1964: Chris Nuttall
- 1965: Geoffrey Day (GBR)
- 1966: Bill Gairdner
- 1967: George Neeland
- 1968: Brian Donnelly
- 1969: George Neeland
- 1970: Tony Nelson
- 1971: Brian Donnelly
- 1972: Tony Nelson
- 1973: George Neeland
- 1974: George Neeland
- 1975: George Neeland
- 1976: Daniel Taillon
- 1977: Pat Fogarty
- 1978: Harold Gretzinger
- 1979: Pat Fogarty
- 1980: Pat Fogarty
- 1981: Mark McKoy
- 1982: Mark McKoy
- 1983: Mark McKoy
- 1984: Mark McKoy
- 1985: Mark McKoy
- 1986: Mark McKoy
- 1987: Mark McKoy
- 1988: Mark McKoy
- 1989: Michael Brodeur
- 1990: Mark McKoy
- 1991: Mark McKoy
- 1992: Tim Kroeker
- 1993: Tim Kroeker
- 1994: Tim Kroeker
- 1995: Tim Kroeker
- 1996: Shaun Wilcox
- 1997: Tony Branch
- 1998: Andrew Lissade
- 1999: Adrian Woodley
- 2000: Adrian Woodley
- 2001: Adrian Woodley
- 2002: Charles Allen
- 2003: Charles Allen
- 2004: Charles Allen
- 2005: Karl Jennings

=== 220 yards hurdles ===
- 1950: Bruce Springbett
- 1951: Pete Steward
- 1952: ?
- 1953: Gordon Crosby

=== 400 metres hurdles ===
Prior to 1967, the event was variously held over 400 metres or 440 yards.

- 1946: ?
- 1947: ?
- 1948: Bill Larochelle
- 1949: Bill Larochelle
- 1950: J. Hayden (USA)
- 1951: Pete Steward
- 1952: Keith Holmes
- 1953: ?
- 1954: Murray Gaziuk
- 1955: Jack McRoberts
- 1956: B. Ingley
- 1957: Malcolm Ash (GBR)
- 1958: George Shepherd
- 1959: George Shepherd
- 1960: George Shepherd
- 1961: George Shepherd
- 1962: George Shepherd
- 1963: John Passmore
- 1964: Bill Gairdner
- 1965: Wesley Brown
- 1966: Bill Gairdner
- 1967: Robert McLaren
- 1968: Val Schierling (USA); Wes Brooker (Canadian Champion)
- 1969: Brian Donnelly
- 1970: Glen Smith
- 1971: Bill Gairdner
- 1972: John Konihowski
- 1973: David Jarvis
- 1974: Gladstone Williams
- 1975: Hamlin Grange
- 1976: Mike Forgrave
- 1977: Mike Forgrave
- 1978: Gladstone Williams
- 1979: Ian Newhouse
- 1980: Bill Siegman
- 1981: Ian Newhouse
- 1982: Ian Newhouse
- 1983: Lloyd Guss
- 1984: Lloyd Guss
- 1985: John Graham
- 1986: Pierre Leveille
- 1987: John Graham
- 1988: John Graham
- 1989: John Graham
- 1990: Craig Hutton
- 1991: Mark Jackson
- 1992: Aaron Derouin
- 1993: Mark Jackson
- 1994: Monte Raymond
- 1995: Michel Genest-Lahaye
- 1996: Monte Raymond
- 1997: Laurier Primeau
- 1998: Alexandre Marchand
- 1999: Alexandre Marchand
- 2000: Nick Stewart
- 2001: Monte Raymond
- 2002: Nick Stewart
- 2003: Adam Kunkel
- 2004: Adam Kunkel
- 2005: Adam Kunkel

=== High jump ===
- 1946: ?
- 1947: Wayne Mann (USA)
- 1948: Art Jackes
- 1949: Art Jackes
- 1950: Art Jackes
- 1951: David Blair
- 1952: A. Patterson
- 1953: Terry Anderson
- 1954: Doug Stuart (AUS)
- 1955: Ian Hume
- 1956: Ken Money
- 1957: Ken Money
- 1958: Ken Money
- 1959: Will Foss
- 1960: Ken Money
- 1961: Dave Dorman
- 1962: Mike Penny
- 1963: Roger Olsen (USA)
- 1964: Steve Spencer
- 1965: John Hunter
- 1966: Steve Spencer
- 1967: Wilf Wedmann
- 1968: Wilf Wedmann
- 1969: Wilf Wedmann
- 1970: Michel Portman
- 1971: Wilf Wedmann
- 1972: John Beers
- 1973: John Beers
- 1974: John Beers
- 1975: Rick Cuttell
- 1976: Greg Joy
- 1977: Greg Joy
- 1978: Greg Joy
- 1979: Milton Ottey
- 1980: Claude Ferragne
- 1981: Milton Ottey
- 1982: Milton Ottey
- 1983: Milton Ottey
- 1984: Milton Ottey
- 1985: Alain Metellus
- 1986: Milton Ottey
- 1987: Milton Ottey
- 1988: Milton Ottey
- 1989: Alain Metellus
- 1990: Cory Siermachesky
- 1991: Vinton Bennett
- 1992: Cory Siermachesky
- 1993: Alex Zaliauskas
- 1994: Cory Siermachesky
- 1995: Charles Lefrançois
- 1996: Kwaku Boateng
- 1997: Mark Boswell
- 1998: Kwaku Boateng
- 1999: Kwaku Boateng
- 2000: Mark Boswell
- 2001: Mark Boswell
- 2002: Mark Boswell
- 2003: Mark Boswell
- 2004: Mark Boswell
- 2005: Kwaku Boateng

=== Pole vault ===
- 1946: ?
- 1947: George Rasmussen (USA)
- 1948: Murray Gayman
- 1949: Ron Miller
- 1950: Eddie Bretta
- 1951: Charles Brigham (USA)
- 1952: Ron Miller
- 1953: Ron Miller
- 1954: Ron Miller
- 1955: Ron Miller
- 1956: Ron Miller
- 1957: B. Land
- 1958: Robert Reid
- 1959: Robert Reid
- 1960: Al Groom
- 1961: Al Groom
- 1962: Al Groom
- 1963: Don Meyers (USA)
- 1964: Gerry Moro
- 1965: Jean Lépine
- 1966: Gerry Moro
- 1967: Bob Raftis
- 1968: Gerry Moro
- 1969: Bob Raftis
- 1970: Bruce Simpson
- 1971: Bruce Simpson
- 1972: Bruce Simpson
- 1973: Allan Kane
- 1974: Ken Wenman
- 1975: Bruce Simpson
- 1976: Ken Wenman
- 1977: Harold Heer
- 1978: Glen Colivas
- 1979: Dave Parker
- 1980: Bruce Simpson
- 1981: Bruce Simpson
- 1982: Bruce Simpson
- 1983: George Barber
- 1984: Mark Baker
- 1985: Frank Bolduc
- 1986: Bob Ferguson
- 1987: Dave Steen
- 1988: Paul Just
- 1989: Doug Wood
- 1990: Doug Wood
- 1991: Doug Wood
- 1992: Paul Just
- 1993: Doug Wood
- 1994: Owen Clements
- 1995: Curt Heywood
- 1996: Paul Just
- 1997: Jeff Hayhoe
- 1998: Rob Pike
- 1999: Jason Pearce
- 2000: Jason Pearce
- 2001: Rob Pike
- 2002: Rob Pike
- 2003: John Zubyck
- 2004: Todd Zubyck
- 2005: Rob Hanson

=== Long jump ===
- 1946: ?
- 1947: Ed Catalano
- 1948: Lionel Fournier
- 1949: Robert Pierce
- 1950: Robert Pierce
- 1951: Alan Craib
- 1952: Pat Galasso
- 1953: Pat Galasso
- 1954: George Shaw (USA)
- 1955: Graham Turnbull
- 1956: David Stafford
- 1957: R. Campbell
- 1958: Jack Smyth
- 1959: Jack Smyth
- 1960: Emmett Smith
- 1961: Patrick Liles (USA)
- 1962: Emmett Smith
- 1963: Roger Mercier
- 1964: Sonny Akpata (NGR)
- 1965: George Britten
- 1966: Emmett Smith
- 1967: Bill Greenough
- 1968: Bill Greenough
- 1969: Michel Charland
- 1970: Mike Mason
- 1971: Mike Mason
- 1972: Jim Buchanan
- 1973: Rick Cuttell
- 1974: Barry Boyd
- 1975: Rick Cuttell
- 1976: Richard Rock
- 1977: Dave Steen
- 1978: Richard Rock
- 1979: Richard Rock
- 1980: Richard Rock
- 1981: Dave Burton
- 1982: Michel Boutet
- 1983: Ian James
- 1984: Richard Rock
- 1985: Kyle McDuffie
- 1986: Ian James
- 1987: Kyle McDuffie
- 1988: Glenroy Gilbert
- 1989: Edrick Floréal
- 1990: Edrick Floréal
- 1991: Ian James
- 1992: Ian James
- 1993: Edrick Floréal
- 1994: Ian James
- 1995: Ian Lowe
- 1996: Trevino Betty
- 1997: Ran Huget
- 1998: Maurice Ennis
- 1999: Richard Duncan
- 2000: Ian Lowe
- 2001: Richard Duncan
- 2002: Kevin Grant
- 2003: Craig Cavanagh
- 2004: Maurice Ennis
- 2005: Maurice Ennis

=== Triple jump ===
- 1946: ?
- 1947: Mike Scanlan (USA)
- 1948: Wallace Brown
- 1949: Earl Carey
- 1950: Bill Robinson
- 1951: Clinton Richardson (USA)
- 1952: Alan Craib
- 1953: Vic Cassis
- 1954: Robert McLaughlin
- 1955: Robert McLaughlin
- 1956: Jack Smyth
- 1957: P. Cadeau
- 1958: Jack Smyth
- 1959: Jack Smyth
- 1960: Jack Smyth
- 1961: B. McKague
- 1962: Howard Jackson
- 1963: Fred Wyers
- 1964: Sonny Akpata (NGR)
- 1965: George Britten
- 1966: Bill Greenough
- 1967: Bill Greenough
- 1968: Bill Greenough
- 1969: Barrie Johnson
- 1970: John Konihowski
- 1971: David Watt
- 1972: Jim Buchanan
- 1973: David Vine
- 1974: Gerry Bell
- 1975: David Watt
- 1976: David Watt
- 1977: David Watt
- 1978: Michael Nepinak
- 1979: Ossie Sargent
- 1980: Michael Nepinak
- 1981: George Wright
- 1982: Lew Golding
- 1983: Lew Golding
- 1984: George Wright
- 1985: George Wright
- 1986: Edrick Floréal
- 1987: Edrick Floréal
- 1988: Edrick Floréal
- 1989: Edrick Floréal
- 1990: Edrick Floréal
- 1991: Edrick Floréal
- 1992: Karl Dyer
- 1993: Karl Dyer
- 1994: George Wright
- 1995: Richard Duncan
- 1996: Jean-Robert Morin
- 1997: Oral Ogilvie
- 1998: Oral Ogilvie
- 1999: Richard Duncan
- 2000: Oral Ogilvie
- 2001: Evgueni Timofeev
- 2002: Shawn Peters
- 2003: Patrick Massok
- 2004: Shawn Peters
- 2005: Marlon Nangle

=== Shot put ===
- 1946: ?
- 1947: Bob Bartlett
- 1948: Eric Coy
- 1949: Eric Coy
- 1950: Vic Frank (USA)
- 1951: George Hills
- 1952: Fred Ruish
- 1953: Stan Raike
- 1954: Stan Raike
- 1955: Stan Raike
- 1956: Stan Raike
- 1957: A. Silver (GBR)
- 1958: Stan Raike
- 1959: Stan Raike
- 1960: Stan Raike
- 1961: David Harrison (GBR)
- 1962: Dave Steen
- 1963: Jack Christopher
- 1964: Ain Roost
- 1965: Dave Steen
- 1966: Dave Steen
- 1967: Dave Steen
- 1968: Dave Steen
- 1969: Dave Steen
- 1970: Bruce Pirnie
- 1971: Mike Mercer
- 1972: Bruce Pirnie
- 1973: Bruce Pirnie
- 1974: Bruce Pirnie
- 1975: Bruce Pirnie
- 1976: Bishop Dolegiewicz
- 1977: Bishop Dolegiewicz
- 1978: Bruno Pauletto
- 1979: Bishop Dolegiewicz
- 1980: Bruno Pauletto
- 1981: Bishop Dolegiewicz
- 1982: Bishop Dolegiewicz
- 1983: Bruno Pauletto
- 1984: Luby Chambul
- 1985: Mike Spiritoso
- 1986: Luby Chambul
- 1987: Rob Venier
- 1988: Rob Venier
- 1989: Lorne Hilton
- 1990: Peter Dajia
- 1991: Peter Dajia
- 1992: Scott Cappos
- 1993: Scott Cappos
- 1994: Scott Cappos
- 1995: Scott Cappos
- 1996: Brad Snyder
- 1997: Jason Tunks
- 1998: Brad Snyder
- 1999: Brad Snyder
- 2000: Jason Gervais
- 2001: Brad Snyder
- 2002: Brad Snyder
- 2003: Brad Snyder
- 2004: Brad Snyder
- 2005: Dylan Armstrong

=== Discus throw ===
- 1946: ?
- 1947: Svein Sigfusson
- 1948: Eric Coy
- 1949: Svein Sigfusson
- 1950: Vic Frank (USA)
- 1951: Robert Adams
- 1952: Roy Pella
- 1953: Stan Raike
- 1954: Roy Pella
- 1955: Bob Bazos
- 1956: Roy Pella
- 1957: A. Silver (GBR)
- 1958: Fred Sontag
- 1959: John Pavelich
- 1960: Stan Raike
- 1961: Fred Sontag
- 1962: Stan Raike
- 1963: Bob Simmons
- 1964: Len Flately
- 1965: Dave Steen
- 1966: George Puce
- 1967: Dave Steen
- 1968: George Puce
- 1969: George Puce
- 1970: Dave Harrington
- 1971: Ain Roost
- 1972: Ain Roost
- 1973: Ain Roost
- 1974: Ain Roost
- 1975: Bishop Dolegiewicz
- 1976: Borys Chambul
- 1977: Borys Chambul
- 1978: Borys Chambul
- 1979: Robert Gray
- 1980: Borys Chambul
- 1981: Jack Harkness
- 1982: Borys Chambul
- 1983: Robert Gray
- 1984: Robert Gray
- 1985: Robert Gray
- 1986: Ray Lazdins
- 1987: Ray Lazdins
- 1988: Ray Lazdins
- 1989: Ray Lazdins
- 1990: Ray Lazdins
- 1991: Ray Lazdins
- 1992: Ray Lazdins
- 1993: Ray Lazdins
- 1994: Ray Lazdins
- 1995: Jason Tunks
- 1996: Jason Tunks
- 1997: Jason Tunks
- 1998: Jason Tunks
- 1999: Jason Tunks
- 2000: Jason Tunks
- 2001: Jason Tunks
- 2002: Jason Tunks
- 2003: Jason Tunks
- 2004: Jason Tunks
- 2005: Jason Tunks

=== Hammer throw ===
- 1946: ?
- 1947: Ross McIssac
- 1948: Svein Sigfusson
- 1949: Svein Sigfusson
- 1950: ?
- 1951: Bob Johnson
- 1952: T. Waugh
- 1953: Not held
- 1954: Marty Engel (USA)
- 1955: Not held
- 1956: Stan Raike
- 1957: Not held
- 1958: Wally Dixon (GBR)
- 1959: Stan Raike
- 1960: Dave Steen
- 1961: David Harrison (GBR)
- 1962: Bill Kerr
- 1963: Bill McIntyre
- 1964: S. Patterson (USA)
- 1965: Jan Versteeg
- 1966: Gerry Wohlfarth
- 1967: Mike Cairns
- 1968: Mike Cairns
- 1969: Gary Salmond
- 1970: Gary Salmond
- 1971: Rob Roeder
- 1972: Gary Salmond
- 1973: Gary Salmond
- 1974: Gary Salmond
- 1975: Murray Keating
- 1976: Scott Neilson
- 1977: Murray Keating
- 1978: Scott Neilson
- 1979: Scott Neilson
- 1980: Scott Neilson
- 1981: Harold Willers
- 1982: Harold Willers
- 1983: Harold Willers
- 1984: Harold Willers
- 1985: Valentin Chumak
- 1986: Darren McFee
- 1987: Darren McFee
- 1988: Darren McFee
- 1989: Darren McFee
- 1990: Evan Brown
- 1991: Evan Brown
- 1992: Boris Stoikos
- 1993: Boris Stoikos
- 1994: Boris Stoikos
- 1995: James Fahie
- 1996: Wes Boudreau
- 1997: John Stoikos
- 1998: John Stoikos
- 1999: Ian Maplethorpe
- 2000: Dylan Armstrong
- 2001: Dylan Armstrong
- 2002: Dylan Armstrong
- 2003: Derek Woodske
- 2004: Jim Steacy
- 2005: Jim Steacy

=== Javelin throw ===
- 1946: Wallace Brown
- 1947: Carl Feneman (USA)
- 1948: Leo Roininen
- 1949: Leo Roininen
- 1950: Leo Roininen
- 1951: John Pavelich
- 1952: Hans Moks
- 1953: Hans Moks
- 1954: Paul Pvuuasalo
- 1955: Hans Moks
- 1956: Olav Mask
- 1957: Hans Moks
- 1958: Hans Moks
- 1959: Lou Liepins
- 1960: Norman Walters
- 1961: Roger Lane (GBR)
- 1962: Dave Baxter
- 1963: Steve Baker
- 1964: Glenn Arbeau
- 1965: Francis Brown (GBR)
- 1966: Zenon Andrusyshyn
- 1967: William Heikkila
- 1968: William Heikikla
- 1969: Stu Hennings
- 1970: Karlo Heiskanen (FIN)
- 1971: Rick Dowswell
- 1972: André Claude
- 1973: Phil Olsen
- 1974: Phil Olsen
- 1975: Phil Olsen
- 1976: Phil Olsen
- 1977: Gheorghe Megelea
- 1978: Gheorghe Megelea
- 1979: John Corazza
- 1980: Gheorghe Megelea
- 1981: Gheorghe Megelea
- 1982: Phil Olsen
- 1983: Phil Olsen
- 1984: Laslo Babits
- 1985: Laslo Babits
- 1986: Peter Massfeller
- 1987: Mike Olma
- 1988: Mike Mahovlich
- 1989: Mike Mahovlich
- 1990: Stephen Feraday
- 1991: Louis Breault
- 1992: Stephen Feraday
- 1993: Stephen Feraday
- 1994: Larry Steinke
- 1995: Erin Bevans
- 1996: Erin Bevans
- 1997: Erin Bevans
- 1998: Erin Bevans
- 1999: Erin Bevans
- 2000: Scott Russell
- 2001: Scott Russell
- 2002: Scott Russell
- 2003: Scott Russell
- 2004: Scott Russell
- 2005: Scott Russell
- 2006 Trevor Snyder

=== Weight throw ===
- 1953: Frank Berst (USA)
- 1955: ?. D'Hondt

=== Decathlon ===
- 1946: Lionel Fournier
- 1947: ?
- 1948: Lionel Fournier
- 1949: ?
- 1950: ?
- 1951: ?
- 1952: Bob Adams
- 1953: ?
- 1954: ?
- 1955: Don Steen
- 1956: Don Steen
- 1957: ?
- 1958: ?
- 1959: George Stulac
- 1960: George Stulac
- 1961: ?
- 1962: Bill Gairdner
- 1963: ?
- 1964: Bill Gairdner
- 1965: Gerry Moro
- 1966: Ron Parker
- 1967: Dave Dorman
- 1968: Dave Dorman
- 1969: Steve Spencer
- 1970: Gordon Stewart
- 1971: Toni Putzi
- 1972: Gerry Moro
- 1973: Barry Lange
- 1974: Gordon Stewart
- 1975: John Gamble
- 1976: Zenon Smiechowski
- 1977: Zenon Smiechowski
- 1978: Zenon Smiechowski
- 1979: Zenon Smiechowski
- 1980: Steve Kemp
- 1981: Rob Town
- 1982: Dave Steen
- 1983: Milan Popadich
- 1984: Milan Popadich
- 1985: Greg Haydenluck
- 1986: Dave Steen
- 1987: Greg Haydenluck
- 1988: Richard Hesketh
- 1989: Mike Smith
- 1990: Mike Smith
- 1991: Garth Peet
- 1992: Garth Peet
- 1993: David Cook
- 1994: Mike Smith
- 1995: Mike Smith
- 1996: Matt Jeffrey
- 1997: Antonie Scholtz
- 1998: Dave Stewart
- 1999: Mike Nolan
- 2000: Mike Nolan
- 2001: Mike Nolan
- 2002: Mike Nolan
- 2003: Mike Nolan
- 2004: Josef Karas
- 2005: James Holder

=== 10 kilometres walk ===
The 1952 event was held on a track.

- 1952: Ferd Hayward

=== 20 kilometres walk ===
From 1973 to 1988, plus 1997, the event was held on a track. In 1984 and 1987, both track and road championships were contested at this distance.

- 1965: Karl-Heinz Merschenz
- 1966: Ron Daniel (USA) & Karl-Heinz Merschenz
- 1967: Felix Cappella
- 1968: Felix Cappella
- 1969: Felix Cappella
- 1970: Not held
- 1971: Frank Johnson
- 1972: Karl-Heinz Merschenz
- 1973: Marcel Jobin
- 1974: Marcel Jobin
- 1975: Marcel Jobin
- 1976: Marcel Jobin
- 1977: Marcel Jobin
- 1978: Marcel Jobin
- 1979: Marcel Jobin
- 1980: Marcel Jobin
- 1981: Marcel Jobin
- 1982: Marcel Jobin
- 1983: Marcel Jobin
- 1984: Marcel Jobin (track) & Daniel Lévesque (road)
- 1985: Guillaume LeBlanc
- 1986: Guillaume LeBlanc
- 1987: Michel Lafortune (track) & Daniel Lévesque (road)
- 1988: Guillaume LeBlanc
- 1989: Guillaume LeBlanc
- 1990: Guillaume LeBlanc
- 1991: Guillaume LeBlanc
- 1992: Tim Berrett
- 1993: Tim Berrett
- 1994: Not held
- 1995: Martin St. Pierre
- 1996: Arturo Huerta
- 1997: Tim Berrett
- 1998: Tim Berrett
- 1999: Arturo Huerta
- 2000: Arturo Huerta
- 2001: Tim Berrett
- 2002: Arturo Huerta
- 2003: Tim Berrett
- 2004: Tim Berrett
- 2005: Tim Berrett

=== 20-mile walk ===
- 1966: Felix Cappella

=== 50 kilometres walk ===
The event was held on a track in 1965.

- 1952: Ferd Hayward
- 1953: Not held
- 1954: Not held
- 1955: Not held
- 1956: Not held
- 1957: Not held
- 1958: Not held
- 1959: Not held
- 1960: Not held
- 1961: Not held
- 1962: Not held
- 1963: Alex Oakley
- 1964: Not held
- 1965: Karl-Heinz Merschenz
- 1966: Alex Oakley
- 1967: Karl-Heinz Merschenz
- 1968: Felix Cappella
- 1969: Not held
- 1970: Pat Farrelly
- 1971: Felix Cappella
- 1972: John Knifton (USA)
- 1973: Pat Farrelly
- 1974: Not held
- 1975: Not held
- 1976: Not held
- 1977: Not held
- 1978: Not held
- 1979: Glen Sweazy
- 1980: Not held
- 1981: Not held
- 1982: Not held
- 1983: Guillaume LeBlanc
- 1984: François Lapointe
- 1985: Not held
- 1986: Mark Henderson
- 1987: Martin Archambault
- 1988: Martín Bermúdez (MEX)
- 1989: Not held
- 1990: Not held
- 1991: Not held
- 1992: Not held
- 1993: Not held
- 1994: Not held
- 1995: Not held
- 1996: Tim Berrett
- 1997: Gordon Mosher
- 1998: Not held
- 1999: Not held
- 2000: Not held
- 2001: Not held
- 2002: Not held
- 2003: Not held
- 2004: Not held
- 2005: Not held

=== Cross country ===
- 1952: ?
- 1953: ?
- 1954: Harry Kennedy
- 1955: ?
- 1956: ?
- 1957: Gordon Dickson
- 1958: ?
- 1959: Gordon Dickson
- 1960: Bruce Kidd
- 1961: Doug Kyle
- 1962: Dave Ellis
- 1963: Bruce Kidd
- 1964: Doug Kyle
- 1965: John Cliff
- 1966: Dave Ellis
- 1967: Bob Fahy
- 1968: ?
- 1969: Jerome Drayton
- 1970: Bob Finlay
- 1971: Richard Munro
- 1972: Grant McLaren
- 1973: Grant McLaren
- 1974: Neil Cusack (IRL)
- 1975: Louis Groarke
- 1976: Dave Slater (GBR)
- 1977: Chris McCubbins
- 1978: Peter Butler
- 1979: Greg Meyer (USA)
- 1980: Vernon Iwancin
- 1981: Peter Butler
- 1982: Vernon Iwancin
- 1983: Paul McCloy
- 1984: Paul McCloy
- 1985: Paul McCloy
- 1986: Paul McCloy
- 1987: Paul McCloy
- 1988: John Halvorsen (NOR)
- 1989: John Halvorsen (NOR)
- 1990: Paul McCloy
- 1991: Richard Charette
- 1992: Richard Charette
- 1993: Joseph Kibur
- 1994: Jeff Schiebler
- 1995: Jason Bunston
- 1996: Jason Bunston
- 1997: Christian Weber
- 1998: Jeff Schiebler
- 1999: Kevin Sullivan
- 2000: Mark Bomba
- 2001: Jean-Paul Niyonsaba (BDI)
- 2002: Simon Bairu
- 2003: Simon Bairu
- 2004: Simon Bairu
- 2005: Simon Bairu

== Women ==
=== 60 metres/yards ===
The event was held variously over 60 metres or 60 yards, depending on the venue.

- 1947: Millie Cheater
- 1948: Not held
- 1949: Not held
- 1950: Not held
- 1951: Not held
- 1952: Not held
- 1953: Eleanor Miller
- 1954: Not held
- 1955: Maureen Rever
- 1956: Not held
- 1957: Eleanor Haslam
- 1958: Not held
- 1959: Valerie Jerome
- 1960: Not held
- 1961: Gillian Harding

=== 75 yards ===
- 1951: Ann Reid
- 1954: Alfrances Lyman (USA)

=== 100 metres ===
- 1947: Jean Atkinson
- 1948: Pat Jones
- 1949: Eleanor McKenzie
- 1951: Eleanor McKenzie
- 1952: Eleanor McKenzie
- 1953: Eleanor Miller
- 1954: Barbara Jones (USA)
- 1955: Maureen Rever
- 1956: Eleanor Haslam
- 1957: Diane Matheson
- 1958: Eleanor Haslam
- 1959: Valerie Jerome
- 1960: Nancy Lewington
- 1961: Gillian Harding
- 1962: Yvonne Breeden
- 1963: Joanne Rootsaert
- 1964: Irene Piotrowski
- 1965: Judy Dallimore
- 1966: Marjorie Bailey
- 1967: Irene Piotrowski
- 1968: Irene Piotrowski
- 1969: Irene Piotrowski
- 1970: Patty Loverock
- 1971: Stephanie Berto
- 1972: Patty Loverock
- 1973: Marjorie Bailey
- 1974: Marjorie Bailey
- 1975: Patty Loverock
- 1976: Patty Loverock
- 1977: Margot Howe
- 1978: Patty Loverock
- 1979: Angella Taylor-Issajenko
- 1980: Angella Taylor-Issajenko
- 1981: Angella Taylor-Issajenko
- 1982: Angella Taylor-Issajenko
- 1983: Angella Taylor-Issajenko
- 1984: Angella Taylor-Issajenko
- 1985: Angela Bailey
- 1986: Angella Taylor-Issajenko
- 1987: Angella Taylor-Issajenko
- 1988: Angella Taylor-Issajenko
- 1989: France Gareau
- 1990: Angela Bailey
- 1991: Karen Clarke
- 1992: Angella Taylor-Issajenko
- 1993: Karen Clarke
- 1994: Simone Tomlinson
- 1995: Karen Clarke
- 1996: Tarama Perry
- 1997: Philomena Mensah
- 1998: Philomena Mensah
- 1999: Philomena Mensah
- 2000: Esi Benyarku
- 2001: Venolyn Clarke
- 2002: Atia Weekes
- 2003: Erica Witter
- 2004: Krysha Bailey
- 2005: Toyin Olupona
- 2006: Genevieve Thibault
- 2007: Toyin Olupona
- 2008: Toyin Olupona
- 2009: Toyin Olupona
- 2010: Toyin Olupona
- 2011: Crystal Emmanuel-Ahye
- 2012: Phylicia George
- 2013: Crystal Emmanuel-Ahye
- 2014: Crystal Emmanuel-Ahye
- 2015: Khamica Bingham
- 2016: Crystal Emmanuel-Ahye
- 2017: Crystal Emmanuel-Ahye
- 2018: Crystal Emmanuel-Ahye
- 2019: Crystal Emmanuel-Ahye
- 2020: Not held
- 2021: Crystal Emmanuel-Ahye
- 2022: Khamica Bingham
- 2023: Khamica Bingham
- 2024: Audrey Leduc
- 2025: Audrey Leduc
- 2026: Audrey Leduc

=== 200 metres ===
- 1947: Betty Mitchell
- 1948: Diane Foster
- 1949: Eleanor McKenzie
- 1950: Not held
- 1951: Eleanor McKenzie
- 1952: Louelle Law
- 1953: Joan Wood
- 1954: Gwen Hobbins
- 1955: Dorothy Kozak
- 1956: Diane Matheson
- 1957: Diane Matheson
- 1958: Eleanor Haslam
- 1959: Heather Campbell
- 1960: Eleanor Haslam
- 1961: Maureen Bardoe
- 1962: Yvonne Breeden
- 1963: Maureen Bardoe
- 1964: Yvonne Breeden
- 1965: Judy Dallimore
- 1966: Jan Maddin
- 1967: Irene Piotrowski
- 1968: Joan Fisher
- 1969: Irene Piotrowski
- 1970: Patty Loverock
- 1971: Stephanie Berto
- 1972: Joyce Yakubowich
- 1973: Patty Loverock
- 1974: Marjorie Bailey
- 1975: Joyce Yakubowich
- 1976: Patty Loverock
- 1977: Margot Howe
- 1978: Patty Loverock
- 1979: Angella Taylor-Issajenko
- 1980: Angella Taylor-Issajenko
- 1981: Angella Taylor-Issajenko
- 1982: Angella Taylor-Issajenko
- 1983: Angella Taylor-Issajenko
- 1984: Angella Taylor-Issajenko
- 1985: Angela Bailey
- 1986: Angella Taylor-Issajenko
- 1987: Angella Taylor-Issajenko
- 1988: Jillian Richardson
- 1989: Jillian Richardson
- 1990: Stacey Bowen
- 1991: Karen Clarke
- 1992: Karen Clarke
- 1993: Stacey Bowen
- 1994: Stacey Bowen
- 1995: Karen Clarke
- 1996: Foy Williams
- 1997: Philomena Mensah
- 1998: Philomena Mensah
- 1999: Philomena Mensah
- 2000: LaDonna Antoine-Watkins
- 2001: LaDonna Antoine-Watkins
- 2002: Kaltouma Nadjina (CHA)
- 2003: Erica Witter
- 2004: Lami Oyewumi
- 2005: Adrienne Power
- 2006: Esther Akinsulie
- 2007: Esther Akinsulie
- 2008: Adrienne Power
- 2009: Adrienne Power
- 2010: Adrienne Power
- 2011: Crystal Emmanuel-Ahye
- 2012: Crystal Emmanuel-Ahye
- 2013: Kimberly Hyacinthe
- 2014: Kimberly Hyacinthe
- 2015: Kimberly Hyacinthe
- 2016: Crystal Emmanuel-Ahye
- 2017: Crystal Emmanuel-Ahye
- 2018: Crystal Emmanuel-Ahye
- 2019: Leya Buchanan
- 2020: Not held
- 2021: Crystal Emmanuel-Ahye
- 2022: Natassha McDonald
- 2023: Jacqueline Madogo
- 2024: Audrey Leduc
- 2025: Audrey Leduc
- 2026: Audrey Leduc

=== 400 metres ===
- 1963: Abby Hoffman
- 1964: Abby Hoffman
- 1965: Cecelia Carter
- 1966: Jan Maddin
- 1967: Margaret Cheskin
- 1968: Joan Fisher
- 1969: Gayle Olinekova
- 1970: Yvonne Saunders
- 1971: Marg MacGowan
- 1972: Joyce Yakubowich
- 1973: Yvonne Saunders
- 1974: Maureen de St. Croix
- 1975: Marg MacGowan
- 1976: Ann Mackie
- 1977: Bev Krotowski
- 1978: Rachelle Campbell
- 1979: Charmaine Crooks
- 1980: Charmaine Crooks
- 1981: Marita Payne
- 1982: Molly Killingbeck
- 1983: Molly Killingbeck
- 1984: Marita Payne
- 1985: Molly Killingbeck
- 1986: Charmaine Crooks
- 1987: Jillian Richardson
- 1988: Charmaine Crooks
- 1989: Charmaine Crooks
- 1990: Charmaine Crooks
- 1991: Charmaine Crooks
- 1992: Camille Noel
- 1993: Camille Noel
- 1994: Stacey Bowen
- 1995: Charmaine Crooks
- 1996: Foy Williams
- 1997: LaDonna Antoine-Watkins
- 1998: LaDonna Antoine-Watkins
- 1999: Foy Williams
- 2000: LaDonna Antoine-Watkins
- 2001: Foy Williams
- 2002: Kaltouma Nadjina (CHA)
- 2003: Foy Williams
- 2004: Danielle Kot
- 2005: Esther Akinsulie
- 2006: Esther Akinsulie
- 2007: Esther Akinsulie
- 2008: Carline Muir
- 2009: Esther Akinsulie
- 2010: Carline Muir
- 2011: Jenna Martin
- 2012: Jenna Martin
- 2010: Alicia Brown
- 2014: Carline Muir
- 2015: Carline Muir

=== 800 metres ===
- 1959: Noreen Deuling
- 1960: Pat Cole
- 1961: Joan Barnicott
- 1962: Abby Hoffman
- 1963: Abby Hoffman
- 1964: Abby Hoffman
- 1965: Abby Hoffman
- 1966: Abby Hoffman
- 1967: Roberta Picco
- 1968: Abby Hoffman
- 1969: Abby Hoffman
- 1970: Penny Werthner
- 1971: Penny Werthner
- 1972: Glenda Reiser
- 1973: Maureen de St. Croix
- 1974: Abby Hoffman
- 1975: Joan Wenzel
- 1976: Maureen McDermott
- 1977: Francine Gendron
- 1978: Debbie Campbell
- 1979: Ann Mackie-Morelli
- 1980: Ann Mackie-Morelli
- 1981: Brit McRoberts
- 1982: Grace Verbeek
- 1983: Brit McRoberts
- 1984: Camille Cato
- 1985: Renée Bélanger
- 1986: Renée Bélanger
- 1987: Mary Burzminski
- 1988: Renée Bélanger
- 1989: Ranza Clark
- 1990: Jeanette Wood
- 1991: Nicole Masil
- 1992: Sarah Howell
- 1993: Nicola Knapp
- 1994: Charmaine Crooks
- 1995: Rita Paulavičienė (LTU)
- 1996: Jean Fletcher
- 1997: Charmaine Crooks
- 1998: Diane Cummins
- 1999: Vicky Lynch-Pounds
- 2000: Diane Cummins
- 2001: Diane Cummins
- 2002: Diane Cummins
- 2003: Diane Cummins
- 2004: Diane Cummins
- 2005: Diane Cummins

=== 1500 metres ===
- 1966: Roberta Picco
- 1967: Roberta Picco
- 1968: Cheryl Somers
- 1969: Noreen Leipens
- 1970: Penny Werthner
- 1971: Thelma Wright
- 1972: Glenda Reiser
- 1973: Glenda Reiser
- 1974: Thelma Wright
- 1975: Thelma Wright
- 1976: Donna Valaitis
- 1977: Debbie Pearson
- 1978: Penny Werthner
- 1979: Francine Gendron
- 1980: Brit McRoberts
- 1981: Debbie Scott-Bowker
- 1982: Debbie Scott-Bowker
- 1983: Debbie Scott-Bowker
- 1984: Debbie Scott-Bowker
- 1985: Debbie Scott-Bowker
- 1986: Brit McRoberts
- 1987: Debbie Scott-Bowker
- 1988: Lynn Kanuka-Williams
- 1989: Angela Chalmers
- 1990: Angela Chalmers
- 1991: Debbie Scott-Bowker
- 1992: Sarah Howell
- 1993: Angela Chalmers
- 1994: Angela Chalmers
- 1995: Leah Pells
- 1996: Sarah Howell
- 1997: Leah Pells
- 1998: Leah Pells
- 1999: Leah Pells
- 2000: Leah Pells
- 2001: Leah Pells
- 2002: Émilie Mondor
- 2003: Carmen Douma-Hussar
- 2004: Malindi Elmore
- 2005: Carmen Douma-Hussar

=== 3000 metres ===
- 1974: Thelma Wright
- 1975: Kathy Prosser
- 1976: Donna Valaitis
- 1977: Debbie Pearson
- 1978: Shauna Miller
- 1979: Shauna Miller
- 1980: Geri Fitch
- 1981: Alison Wiley
- 1982: Debbie Scott-Bowker
- 1983: Lynn Kanuka-Williams
- 1984: Lynn Kanuka-Williams
- 1985: Ulla Marquette
- 1986: Lynn Kanuka-Williams
- 1987: Lynn Kanuka-Williams
- 1988: Alison Wiley
- 1989: Paula Schnurr
- 1990: Leah Pells
- 1991: Robyn Meagher
- 1992: Ulla Marquette
- 1993: Leah Pells
- 1994: Angela Chalmers

=== 5000 metres ===
- 1995: Kathy Butler
- 1996: Tina Connelly
- 1997: Carol Howe
- 1998: Sherri Smith
- 1999: Kathy Butler
- 2000: Tina Connelly
- 2001: Courtney Babcock-Key
- 2002: Courtney Babcock-Key
- 2003: Émilie Mondor
- 2004: Émilie Mondor
- 2005: Megan Wright

=== 10,000 metres ===
- 1982: Anne-Marie Malone
- 1983: Bev Bush
- 1984: Colette Desrosiers
- 1985: Jacqueline Gareau
- 1986: Carole Rouillard
- 1987: Nancy Tinari
- 1988: Carole Rouillard
- 1989: Carole Rouillard
- 1990: Carole Rouillard
- 1991: Carole Rouillard
- 1992: Jackie Mota
- 1993: Lisa Harvey
- 1994: Ulla Marquette
- 1995: Lyudmila Alexeef
- 1996: Lyudmila Alexeef
- 1997: Jackie Mota
- 1998: Jackie Mota
- 1999: Tina Connelly
- 2000: Lisa Harvey
- 2001: Tina Connelly
- 2002: Courtney Babcock-Key
- 2003: Courtney Babcock-Key
- 2004: Lucy Smith
- 2005: Tara Quinn-Smith
- 2006: Tara Quinn-Smith

=== Half marathon ===
- 2004: Tina Connelly
- 2005: Tara Quinn-Smith

=== Marathon ===
- 1976: Eleanor Thomas
- 1977: ?
- 1978: Chris Lavalee
- 1979: Sandra Davis
- 1980: Janet Welshaupt
- 1981: Linda Staudt
- 1982: Cindy Hamilton
- 1983: Cindy Hamilton
- 1984: Silvia Ruegger
- 1985: Bernadette Duffy
- 1986: Ellen Rochefort
- 1987: Marjory Stewart
- 1988: Jean Payette
- 1989: Ellen Rochefort
- 1990: Claire Kroshus
- 1991: Laura Konantz
- 1992: Not held
- 1993: Not held
- 1994: Not held
- 1995: Not held
- 1996: Not held
- 1997: Not held
- 1998: Not held
- 1999: Not held
- 2000: Véronique Vandersmissen
- 2001: Danuta Bartoszek
- 2002: Tania Jones
- 2003: Not held
- 2004: Nicole Stevenson
- 2005: Lyudmila Korchagina
- 2006: Lyudmila Korchagina

=== 3000 metres steeplechase ===
- 1999: Karen Harvey
- 2000: Kristen Brennand
- 2001: Karen Sullivan
- 2002: Margaret Butler
- 2003: Tania Vander Meulen
- 2004: Haley Digel
- 2005: Lise Ogrodnick

=== 80 metres hurdles ===
- 1947: Edith Skitch
- 1948: Rosella Thorne
- 1949: Rosella Thorne
- 1950: Not held
- 1951: Alice Foltz
- 1952: Shirley Eckel
- 1953: Shirley Eckel
- 1954: Gwen Hobbins
- 1955: May Saunders
- 1956: Shirley Eckel
- 1957: Sheila Hood
- 1958: Pat Power
- 1959: Pat Power
- 1960: Sally McCallum
- 1961: Gillian Harding
- 1962: Jenny Meldrum
- 1963: Jenny Meldrum
- 1964: Jenny Meldrum
- 1965: Jenny Meldrum
- 1966: Cathy Chapman
- 1967: Jenny Meldrum
- 1968: Mamie Rallins (USA)

=== 100 metres hurdles ===
- 1969: Penny May
- 1970: Liz Damman
- 1971: Penny May
- 1972: Linda Wilson
- 1973: Wendy Taylor
- 1974: Sue Bradley
- 1975: Liz Damman
- 1976: Joanne MacLeod
- 1977: Diane Jones-Konihowski
- 1978: Sharon Lane
- 1979: Sharon Lane
- 1980: Sue Bradley
- 1981: Sharon Lane
- 1982: Sue Kameli
- 1983: Sue Kameli
- 1984: Sylvia Malgadey-Forgrave
- 1985: Cecilia Branch
- 1986: Faye Blackwood
- 1987: Karen Nelson
- 1988: Karen Nelson
- 1989: Karen Nelson
- 1990: Karen Nelson
- 1991: Karen Nelson
- 1992: Sonia Paquette
- 1993: Donalda Duprey
- 1994: Donalda Duprey
- 1995: Lesley Tashlin
- 1996: Sonia Paquette
- 1997: Keturah Anderson
- 1998: Keturah Anderson
- 1999: Keturah Anderson
- 2000: Perdita Felicien
- 2001: Angela Whyte
- 2002: Perdita Felicien
- 2003: Perdita Felicien
- 2004: Perdita Felicien
- 2005: Perdita Felicien

=== 200 metres hurdles ===
- 1969: Peggy Busch
- 1970: Jill Pelland
- 1971: Penny May
- 1972: Jean Sparling
- 1973: Jean Sparling

=== 400 metres hurdles ===
- 1974: Francine Gendron
- 1975: Francine Gendron
- 1976: Eleanor Mahal
- 1977: Francine Gendron
- 1978: Eleanor Mahal
- 1979: Wendy Davies
- 1980: Andrea Wachter
- 1981: Andrea Page
- 1982: Andrea Page
- 1983: Gwen Wall
- 1984: Andrea Page
- 1985: Gwen Wall
- 1986: Gwen Wall
- 1987: Gwen Wall
- 1988: Rosey Edeh
- 1989: Rosey Edeh
- 1990: Caroline Fontin
- 1991: Rosey Edeh
- 1992: Erica Peterson
- 1993: Rosey Edeh
- 1994: Donalda Duprey
- 1995: Rosey Edeh
- 1996: Donalda Duprey
- 1997: Donalda Duprey
- 1998: Karlene Haughton
- 1999: Karlene Haughton
- 2000: Karlene Haughton
- 2001: Karlene Haughton
- 2002: Karlene Haughton
- 2003: Tawa Babatunde
- 2004: Tawa Babatunde
- 2005: Tawa Dortch

=== High jump ===
- 1947: Pat Flemming
- 1948: Doreen Dredge
- 1949: Shirley Gordon Olafsson
- 1950: Not held
- 1951: Alice Whitty
- 1952: Alice Whitty
- 1953: Arlene Weeks
- 1954: Ruth Hendron
- 1955: Carol Hemming
- 1956: Alice Whitty
- 1957: Carol Hemming
- 1958: Alice Whitty
- 1959: Alice Whitty
- 1960: Alice Whitty
- 1961: Francis Wigson
- 1962: Sandra Barr
- 1963: Dianne Gerace
- 1964: Dianne Gerace
- 1965: Susan Nigh
- 1966: Susan Nigh
- 1967: Susan Nigh
- 1968: Debbie Brill
- 1969: Debbie Brill
- 1970: Debbie Brill
- 1971: Debbie Brill
- 1972: Louise Hanna-Walker
- 1973: Louise Hanna-Walker
- 1974: Debbie Brill
- 1975: Louise Hanna-Walker
- 1976: Debbie Brill
- 1977: Maggie Woods
- 1978: Debbie Brill
- 1979: Brigitte Reid
- 1980: Debbie Brill
- 1981: Scarlet Vanden Bos
- 1982: Debbie Brill
- 1983: Debbie Brill
- 1984: Debbie Brill
- 1985: Jeannie Cockroft
- 1986: Shari Orders
- 1987: Leslie Estwick
- 1988: Linda Cameron
- 1989: Leslie Estwick
- 1990: Roberta Thoen
- 1991: Leslie Estwick
- 1992: Nathalie Belfort
- 1993: Wanita Dykstra
- 1994: Sara McGladdery
- 1995: Sara McGladdery
- 1996: Christina Livingston
- 1997: Christina Livingston
- 1998: Nicole Forrester
- 1999: Nicole Forrester
- 2000: Wanita May
- 2001: Wanita May
- 2002: Nicole Forrester
- 2003: Wanita May
- 2004: Wanita May
- 2005: Whitney Evans

=== Pole vault ===
- 1995: Rebecca Chambers
- 1996: Jackie Honey
- 1997: Trista Bernier
- 1998: Trista Bernier
- 1999: Rebecca Chambers
- 2000: Ardin Harrison
- 2001: Stephanie McCann
- 2002: Stephanie McCann
- 2003: Stephanie McCann
- 2004: Dana Ellis
- 2005: Dana Ellis

=== Long jump ===
- 1947: Elaine Silburn
- 1948: Elaine Silburn
- 1949: Elaine Silburn
- 1950: Not held
- 1951: Dawn Josephs
- 1952: Dawn Josephs
- 1953: Rosella Thorne
- 1954: Rosella Thorne
- 1955: Annabelle Murray
- 1956: Annabelle Murray
- 1957: Maureen Rever
- 1958: Maureen Rever
- 1959: Valerie Jerome
- 1960: Sally McCallum
- 1961: Jenny Meldrum
- 1962: Joanne Rootsaert
- 1963: Dianne Gerace
- 1964: Dianne Gerace
- 1965: Jenny Meldrum
- 1966: Jenny Meldrum
- 1967: Jenny Meldrum
- 1968: Joan Hendry
- 1969: Brenda Eisler
- 1970: Yvonne Saunders
- 1971: Penny May
- 1972: Brenda Eisler
- 1973: Brenda Eisler
- 1974: Ann Bryan
- 1975: Brenda Eisler
- 1976: Diane Jones-Konihowski
- 1977: Diane Jones-Konihowski
- 1978: Diane Jones-Konihowski
- 1979: Jill Ross-Giffen
- 1980: Jill Ross-Giffen
- 1981: Nicole Ali
- 1982: Karen Nelson
- 1983: Carol Galloway
- 1984: Carol Galloway
- 1985: Donna Smellie
- 1986: Sharon Clarke
- 1987: Tracy Smith
- 1988: Tracy Smith
- 1989: Tania Redhead
- 1990: Tania Redhead
- 1991: Angela Taylor (USA)
- 1992: Vanessa Monar
- 1993: Vanessa Monar-Enweani
- 1994: Catherine Bond-Mills
- 1995: Nicole Devonish
- 1996: Leslie Estwick
- 1997: Jackie Edwards (BAH)
- 1998: Vanessa Monar-Enweani
- 1999: Vanessa Monar-Enweani
- 2000: Alice Falaiye
- 2001: Alice Falaiye
- 2002: Tracy Dulmage-Sprague
- 2003: Alice Falaiye
- 2004: Alice Falaiye
- 2005: Alice Falaiye

=== Triple jump ===
From 1987 to 1989 the women's triple jump was held but did not have championship status.

- 1987: Pam Prophet
- 1988: Laverne Clarke
- 1989: Laverne Clarke
- 1990: Laverne Clarke
- 1991: Laverne Clarke
- 1992: Kelly Dinsmore
- 1993: Kelly Dinsmore
- 1994: Michelle Hastick
- 1995: Kelly Dinsmore
- 1996: Kelly Dinsmore
- 1997: Michelle Hastick
- 1998: Michelle Hastick
- 1999: Michelle Hastick
- 2000: Althea Williams
- 2001: Michelle Hastick
- 2002: Althea Williams
- 2003: Althea Williams
- 2004: Althea Williams
- 2005: Althea Williams

=== Shot put ===
- 1947: Patricia Lawson
- 1948: Doreen Clough
- 1949: Joyce Brennan
- 1950: Not held
- 1951: ?
- 1952: Mary Lawrence
- 1953: Jackie MacDonald
- 1954: Jackie MacDonald
- 1955: Jackie MacDonald
- 1956: Jackie MacDonald
- 1957: Pat Dobie
- 1958: Jackie MacDonald
- 1959: Pat Dobie
- 1960: Sharon Cliffe
- 1961: Pat Dobie
- 1962: Nancy McCredie
- 1963: Nancy McCredie
- 1964: Nancy McCredie
- 1965: Nancy McCredie
- 1966: Nancy McCredie
- 1967: Nancy McCredie
- 1968: Maureen Dowds
- 1969: Joan Pavelich
- 1970: Marlene Kurt
- 1971: Diane Jones-Konihowski
- 1972: Joan Pavelich
- 1973: Diane Jones-Konihowski
- 1974: Jane Haist
- 1975: Carmen Ionesco (ROM)
- 1976: Lucette Moreau
- 1977: Diane Jones-Konihowski
- 1978: Carmen Ionesco
- 1979: Rose Hauch
- 1980: Diane Jones-Konihowski
- 1981: Carmen Ionesco
- 1982: Carmen Ionesco
- 1983: Rose Hauch
- 1984: Rose Hauch
- 1985: Rose Hauch
- 1986: Melody Torcolacci
- 1987: Melody Torcolacci
- 1988: Shannon Kekula
- 1989: Melody Torcolacci
- 1990: Georgette Reed
- 1991: Melody Torcolacci
- 1992: Georgette Reed
- 1993: Georgette Reed
- 1994: Georgette Reed
- 1995: Georgette Reed
- 1996: Beth Bunge (USA)
- 1997: Georgette Reed
- 1998: Georgette Reed
- 1999: Georgette Reed
- 2000: Georgette Reed
- 2001: Georgette Reed
- 2002: Georgette Reed
- 2003: Georgette Reed
- 2004: Caroline Larose
- 2005: Caroline Larose

=== Discus throw ===
- 1947: Hazel Braithwaite
- 1948: Joyce Brennan
- 1949: Joyce Brennan
- 1950: Not held
- 1951: ?
- 1952: Joyce Brennan
- 1953: Joyce Brennan
- 1954: Helen Metchuk
- 1955: Jackie MacDonald
- 1956: Jackie MacDonald
- 1957: Pat Dobie
- 1958: Marie Depree
- 1959: Marie Depree
- 1960: Lydia Terry
- 1961: Marie Depree
- 1962: Pat Dobie
- 1963: Nancy McCredie
- 1964: Nancy McCredie
- 1965: Nancy McCredie
- 1966: Nancy McCredie
- 1967: Carol Martin
- 1968: Carol Martin
- 1969: Carol Martin
- 1970: Marlene Kurt
- 1971: Marlene Kurt
- 1972: Carol Martin
- 1973: Carmen Ionesco (ROM)
- 1974: Jane Haist
- 1975: Carmen Ionesco (ROM)
- 1976: Lucette Moreau
- 1977: Doreen Garner
- 1978: Carmen Ionesco
- 1979: Carmen Ionesco
- 1980: Lucette Moreau
- 1981: Carmen Ionesco
- 1982: Carmen Ionesco
- 1983: Sharon Curik
- 1984: Carmen Ionesco
- 1985: Gale Dolegiewicz
- 1986: Gale Dolegiewicz
- 1987: Gale Dolegiewicz
- 1988: Gale Dolegiewicz
- 1989: Gale Dolegiewicz
- 1990: Gale Dolegiewicz
- 1991: Anna Mosdell
- 1992: Jackie McKernan (GBR)
- 1993: Theresa Brick
- 1994: Anna Mosdell
- 1995: Georgette Reed
- 1996: Theresa Brick
- 1997: Georgette Reed
- 1998: Nicole Chimko
- 1999: Robin Lyons
- 2000: Tina McDonald
- 2001: Nicole Chimko
- 2002: Marie-Josée LeJour
- 2003: Tina McDonald
- 2004: Julie Bourgon
- 2005: Marie-Josée LeJour-McDonagh

=== Hammer throw ===
From 1987 to 1989 the women's hammer throw was held but did not have championship status.

- 1987: Theresa Brick
- 1988: Theresa Brick
- 1989: Theresa Brick
- 1990: Theresa Brick
- 1991: Theresa Brick
- 1992: Cathy Griffin
- 1993: Theresa Brick
- 1994: Theresa Brick
- 1995: Theresa Brick
- 1996: Theresa Brick
- 1997: Caroline Wittrin
- 1998: Caroline Wittrin
- 1999: Caroline Wittrin
- 2000: Michelle Fournier
- 2001: Caroline Wittrin
- 2002: Michelle Fournier
- 2003: Jennifer Joyce
- 2004: Jennifer Joyce
- 2005: Jennifer Joyce

=== Javelin throw ===
- 1947: Sylvia Fedoruk
- 1948: Rhoda Wurtele
- 1949: Nora Young
- 1950: Not held
- 1951: ?
- 1952: Mary Lawrence
- 1953: Joyce Brennan
- 1954: Mary Lawrence
- 1955: Margaret George
- 1956: Margaret George
- 1957: Pat Dobie
- 1958: Margaret George
- 1959: Wendy Kellond
- 1960: Pat Dobie
- 1961: Pat Dobie
- 1962: Pat Dobie
- 1963: Valerie Jensen
- 1964: Christa Leipert
- 1965: Nancy McCredie
- 1966: Jay Dahlgren
- 1967: Jay Dahlgren
- 1968: Jay Dahlgren
- 1969: Jay Dahlgren
- 1970: Val Peterson
- 1971: Val Peterson
- 1972: Jay Dahlgren
- 1973: Laurie Kern
- 1974: Jay Dahlgren
- 1975: Jay Dahlgren
- 1976: Alison Hayward
- 1977: Sue Gibson
- 1978: Alison Hayward
- 1979: Laurie Kern
- 1980: Laurie Kern
- 1981: Sue Gibson
- 1982: Monique Laprés
- 1983: Monique Laprés
- 1984: Cindy Crapper
- 1985: Céline Chartrand
- 1986: Kristy Evans
- 1987: Faye Roblin
- 1988: Isabelle Surprenant
- 1989: Cheryl Coker
- 1990: Lori LaRowe
- 1991: Isabelle Surprenant
- 1992: Isabelle Surprenant
- 1993: Eileen Volpatti
- 1994: Valerie Tulloch
- 1995: Isabelle Surprenant
- 1996: Signi MacNeil
- 1997: Sandy Taylor
- 1998: Nicole Chimko
- 1999: Andrea Bulat
- 2000: Dominique Bilodeau
- 2001: Dominique Bilodeau
- 2002: Dominique Bilodeau
- 2003: Dominique Bilodeau
- 2004: Dominique Bilodeau
- 2005: Dominique Bilodeau

=== Pentathlon ===
- 1964: Dianne Gerace
- 1965: Jenny Meldrum
- 1966: Joyce Madden
- 1967: Jenny Meldrum
- 1968: ?
- 1969: Diane Jones-Konihowski
- 1970: Jenny Meldrum
- 1971: ?
- 1972: ?
- 1973: Diane Jones-Konihowski
- 1974: Diane Jones-Konihowski
- 1975: Diane Jones-Konihowski
- 1976: Diane Jones-Konihowski
- 1977: Diane Jones-Konihowski
- 1978: Diane Jones-Konihowski
- 1979: Jill Ross-Giffen
- 1980: Karen Page (NZL)

=== Heptathlon ===
- 1981: Diane Jones-Konihowski
- 1982: Jill Ross-Giffen
- 1983: Jill Ross-Giffen
- 1984: Jill Ross-Giffen
- 1985: Alison Armstrong
- 1986: Linda Spenst
- 1987: Janet Scott
- 1988: Donna Smellie
- 1989: Catherine Bond-Mills
- 1990: Catherine Bond-Mills
- 1991: Catherine Bond-Mills
- 1992: Catherine Bond-Mills
- 1993: Catherine Bond-Mills
- 1994: Catherine Bond-Mills
- 1995: Catherine Bond-Mills
- 1996: Esther Medema
- 1997: Catherine Bond-Mills
- 1998: Catherine Bond-Mills
- 1999: Catherine Bond-Mills
- 2000: Nicole Haynes
- 2001: Jessica Zelinka
- 2002: Nicole Haynes
- 2003: Nicole Haynes
- 2004: Jessica Zelinka
- 2005: Jessica Zelinka

=== 5000 metres walk ===
- 1970: Jocelyn Richard
- 1971: Not held
- 1972: Not held
- 1973: Not held
- 1974: Jacqueline Sauve
- 1975: Not held
- 1976: Jacinthe Théberge
- 1977: Lilly Whalen
- 1978: Lilly Whalen
- 1979: Hélène Daviau
- 1980: Ann Peel
- 1981: Ann Peel
- 1982: Ann Peel
- 1983: Sue Cook (AUS)
- 1984: Ann Peel
- 1985: Janice McCaffrey
- 1986: Ann Peel
- 1987: Ann Peel

=== 10 kilometres walk ===
In 1988 two events were held, one on the track and one on roads. The 1997 event was held on a track.

- 1983: Ann Peel
- 1984: Ann Peel
- 1985: Not held
- 1986: Ann Peel
- 1987: Janice McCaffrey
- 1988: Ann Peel (track) & Alison Baker (road)
- 1989: Janice McCaffrey
- 1990: Pascale Grand
- 1991: Tina Poitras
- 1992: Corinne Whissel
- 1993: Alison Baker
- 1994: Janice McCaffrey
- 1995: Tina Poitras
- 1996: Tina Poitras
- 1997: Tina Poitras
- 1998: Janice McCaffrey
- 1999: Not held
- 2000: Not held
- 2001: Kim Cathro
- 2002: Holly Gerke
- 2003: Karen Foan
- 2004: Holly Gerke

=== 20 kilometres walk ===
- 1997: Susan Hornung
- 1998: Holly Gerke
- 1999: Janice McCaffrey
- 2000: Janice McCaffrey
- 2001: Karen Foan
- 2002: Marina Crivello
- 2003: Karen Foan
- 2004: Marina Crivello
- 2005: Marina Crivello

=== Cross country ===
- 1962: ?
- 1963: Abby Hoffman
- 1964: Abby Hoffman
- 1965: Roberta Picco
- 1966: Brenda Mah
- 1967: Thelma Wright
- 1968: Thelma Wright
- 1969: Doris Brown Heritage (USA)
- 1970: Shauna Miller
- 1971: Glenda Reiser
- 1972: Glenda Reiser
- 1973: Thelma Wright
- 1974: Thelma Wright
- 1975: Sheila Currie
- 1976: Donna Valaitis
- 1977: Magda Kubasiewicz
- 1978: Nancy Rooks
- 1979: Veronica Poryckyj
- 1980: Silvia Ruegger
- 1981: Tracy Kelly
- 1982: Nancy Rooks
- 1983: Wendy van Mierlo
- 1984: Carole Rouillard
- 1985: Elena Evanoff
- 1986: Nancy Rooks
- 1987: Brenda Shackleton
- 1988: Lucille Smith
- 1989: Lucille Smith
- 1990: Annick de Gooyer
- 1991: Lucille Smith
- 1992: Lucille Smith
- 1993: Paula Schnurr
- 1994: Leah Pells
- 1995: Kathy Butler
- 1996: Kathy Butler
- 1997: Lucille Smith
- 1998: Tina Connelly
- 1999: Tina Connelly
- 2000: Courtney Babcock-Key
- 2001: Sarah Dupre
- 2002: Émilie Mondor
- 2003: Émilie Mondor
- 2004: Rebecca Stallwood
- 2005: Carmen Douma-Hussar
