= Dave Steen (shot putter) =

Canadian track and field athlete (born 1942)

Medal record

Men's athletics

Representing Canada

Commonwealth Games
Bronze medal – third place	1962 Perth	Shot put
Gold medal – first place	1966 Kingston	Shot put
Gold medal – first place	1970 Edinburgh	Shot put

Pan American Games
Bronze medal – third place	1967 Winnipeg	Shot put

David Lorne Steen (born 2 January 1942) is a Canadian former track and field athlete who specialised in the shot put. He was a two-time gold medallist in the event at the Commonwealth Games in 1966 and 1970, breaking games records both times. He had won the bronze medal at the 1962 event. His personal record was 19.21 m (63 ft 1/4 in), set in 1970.

He was a nine-time national champion in throwing events at the Canadian Track and Field Championships. Also among his honours were a shot put bronze at the 1967 Pan American Games and two bronze medals in the shot and discus at the 1969 Pacific Conference Games. He was coached by Bill Bowerman within the Oregon Ducks track and field program and was part of the winning team for the 1962 American collegiate NCAA title.

After retiring from sport, he became a writer. He was a journalist at the Toronto Star from 1968 to 1994, wrote several non-fiction books on exercise, and published his first novel A Bicycle Story in 2022.

== Career ==
=== Early life ===
A native of Burnaby, British Columbia, he became interested in athletics through the exploits of his older brother Don Steen, who became the national decathlon champion in 1955. - Oct 20, 1966 His brother later named his son David Steen, who continued the family's athletic tradition.

He had his first achievements in the shot put while at Douglas Road Elementary School in Burnaby, winning the school title at age eleven. At Burnaby South Secondary School he established himself as one of Canada's best young throwers by setting a national age-group record in the shot put. Steen grew to be a tall man, at six-foot and four and a half inches, and as his physique developed he reached a weight of 235 pounds. He went on to study at the University of Oregon, where he became part of the Oregon Ducks track and field led by coach Bill Bowerman. A central team member in the throw events, Steen placed fifth at the NCAA Men's Division I Outdoor Track and Field Championships in 1962 and competed in the preliminaries of the discus throw. His contribution helped Oregon to the NCAA team title. The following year he had his best placing in NCAA competition, coming second in the shot put final.

=== International career ===
Steen won his first national title as a teenager in 1960, winning the hammer throw, which was not very developed at a national level at that point. His first national title in the shot put came at the Canadian Track and Field Championships in 1962. His winning mark of 17.20 m (56 ft 5 in) was by far the best ever performance in the competition's history at that point. This earned him his first major international call-up for the 1962 British Empire and Commonwealth Games, held in Perth, Western Australia. There he had a throw of 17.90 m (58 ft 8 1/2 in), which would have won all previous titles but on this occasion was a close third behind Martyn Lucking and Mike Lindsay.

In the 1963 track and field season he achieved a Canadian record of 18.88 m (61 ft 11 1/4 in), having previously become the first Canadian to throw sixty feet, achieved earlier that year in a Portland, Oregon meet where he defeated Parry O'Brien a two-time Olympic champion and world record holder. For a few weeks in 1963 Steen's top throw was ranked first in the world; he finished the year seventh globally. He was among Canada's top prospects for the 1964 Summer Olympics, but in 1963 he criticized the attitude of officials at the Canadian Amateur Athletic Union, saying that they were not sufficiently concerned with the well-being of the nation's athletes. Suffering heavily from infectious mononucleosis, he ultimately missed the entire 1964 season, including the Olympic competition.

Steen returned to form in 1965 with a second career title at the Canadian Championships and a season's best of 18.52 m (60 ft 9 in). He also won his first national title in the discus throw, doing so with 51.62 m (169 ft 4 1/4 in). The following year he set a new shot put personal best of 19.12 m (62 ft 8 3/4 in) to win the Canadian title in a championship record. This mark ranked him eleventh in the world that season and went unbettered nationally until Bruce Pirnie's 1972 win. The 1966 British Empire and Commonwealth Games in Kingston, Jamaica saw Steen became Canada's first ever shot put gold medallist at the competition. His winning throw of 18.79 m (61 ft 7 3/4 in) was a large improvement on the Commonwealth Games record set by Lucking four years earlier. In addition to the shot put, he competed in the discus event and placed fourth.

He took a shot put and discus double at the 1967 national championships and his best throw that year was 18.55 m (60 ft 10 1/4 in). He came close to that seasonal peak at the 1967 Pan American Games, which were held on home turf in Winnipeg, Manitoba, Canada. He was the bronze medallist behind two Americans who were world leaders at that point: Randy Matson, who was Olympic champion the year after, and Neal Steinhauer, the top ranked putter in 1969. Steen's 1967 medal was Canada's first in the Pan American men's shot put (his compatriot Nancy McCredie won the women shot that year).

Steen was Canadian champion in the shot put in both 1968 and 1969, solidifying an unbeaten run from 1965. The latter title was his last at national level. He was selected for the Canadian team for the inaugural 1969 Pacific Conference Games and a performance of 18.54 m (60 ft 9 3/4 in) in the shot put and 54.94 m (180 ft 2 3/4 in) in the discus brought him two bronze medals. His teammate George Puce was the discus winner at the event in Tokyo.

He returned to defend his shot put title at the 1970 British Commonwealth Games. The 28-year-old successfully topped the podium again, winning the gold medal with a new games record (and lifetime best) of 19.21 m (63 ft 1/4 in). He was the first man to defend that title since Harry Hart did so in 1934. He again competed in the discus throw as well, and ranked tenth with a mark of 50.64 m (166 ft 1 1/2 in). This was the last major competition of his career. He was inducted into the Canadian Olympic Hall of Fame in 1977.

=== Writing and coaching ===
After his retirement from competition he began coaching young athletes in the 1970s. This included novelist Lawrence Hill—a keen teenage runner—whom Steen advised to focus on writing after a poor outcome of a fitness test. His athletes also included three Olympians - John Craig, Paul Craig, and Brian Maxwell. Maxwell went on to be the co-inventor of Power Bars.

He was a writer and editor for the Toronto Star from 1968 to 1994. Steen wrote several books, including the Canadian Pilot's Fitness Manual in 1979 before moving into youth sport with Aerobic fun for kids in 1982 and Exercise is fun a decade later. He published A Bicycle Story in 2022, a mystery novel covering cycling, ageing and crime.

== Personal life ==
He married Margaret Daly, also a journalist, in Chicago in late 1963, though this was short-lived. Steen married for a second time in 1967 to Cassie Gairdner, a former Eastern Canadian junior champion discus thrower (introduced by Cassie’s brother and then Steen's teammate, Olympic decathlete Bill Gairdner). They had 3 children: Laura Jane, Heather and Stefan. In 1996 he moved back to British Columbia to live by the ocean, write, and take up competitive cycling.

== International competitions ==
Year	Competition	Venue	Position	Event	Notes
1962	British Empire and Commonwealth Games	Perth, Western Australia	3rd	Shot put	17.90 m
1966	British Empire and Commonwealth Games	Kingston, Jamaica	1st	Shot put	18.79 m GR
1966	British Empire and Commonwealth Games	Kingston, Jamaica	4th	Discus throw	54.24 m
1967	Pan American Games	Winnipeg, Manitoba, Canada	3rd	Shot put	18.51 m
1969	Pacific Conference Games	Tokyo, Japan	3rd	Shot put	18.54 m
1969	Pacific Conference Games	Tokyo, Japan	3rd	Discus throw	54.94 m
1970	British Commonwealth Games	Edinburgh, Scotland	1st	Shot put	19.21 m GR
1970	British Commonwealth Games	Edinburgh, Scotland	10th	Discus throw	50.64 m

== National titles ==
- Canadian Track and Field Championships
  - Shot put: 1962, 1965, 1966, 1967, 1968, 1969
  - Discus throw: 1965, 1967
  - Hammer throw: 1960
