= Athletics at the 1994 Commonwealth Games – Men's shot put =

Men's shot put at the Commonwealth Games

The men's shot put event at the 1994 Commonwealth Games was held on 28 August at the Centennial Stadium in Victoria, British Columbia.

== Results ==
Rank	Name	Nationality	#1	#2	#3	#4	#5	#6	Result	Notes
1st place, gold medalist(s)	Matt Simson	England	19.05	x	19.01	19.47	19.49	19.25	19.49	PB
2nd place, silver medalist(s)	Courtney Ireland	New Zealand	18.98	18.84	18.61	19.12	18.56	19.38	19.38	
3rd place, bronze medalist(s)	Chima Ugwu	Nigeria	18.50	18.84	19.09	18.57	19.26		19.26	
4	Carel Le Roux	South Africa							18.50	
5	Scott Cappos	Canada	17.37	18.06	17.66	18.35	17.85	x	18.35	
6	Burger Lambrechts	South Africa							18.15	
7	Nigel Spratley	England							17.96	
8	John Minns	Australia	17.82	x	17.96	x			17.96	
9	Elias Louca	Cyprus							17.67	
10	Mihalis Louca	Cyprus							17.41	
11	Peter Dajia	Canada							16.26	
12	Stephen Whyte	Scotland							16.17	
13	Felix Hyde	Ghana							15.82	
14	Lee Wiltshire	Wales							15.22	
	Adewale Olukoju	Nigeria							DNS	
