= Sue Gibson =

Sue Gibson may refer to:

- Sue Gibson (skier) (born 1955), alpine skier from New Zealand
- Sue Gibson (cinematographer) (1952–2016), British cinematographer
- Sue Gibson (chemist) (born 1960), British research chemist
- Sue Gibson (javelin thrower), Canadian javelin thrower, 1977 and 1981 Canadian champion

== See also ==
- Susan Gibson, American singer and songwriter
