= Grant MacLaren =

Grant MacLaren may refer to:

- Grant MacLaren (Travelers)
- Grant MacLaren, president of BC Lions

== See also ==
- Grant McLaren, athlete
