= Margaret George (disambiguation) =

Margaret George may refer to:

- Margaret George (born 1943), historical novelist
- Margaret George (athlete) (born 1937), Canadian Olympic athlete
- Margaret George Shello (1941–1969), Assyrian guerrilla fighter
- Margaret H. George (born 1928), American author and former politician
- Margaret Lloyd George (1866–1941), first wife of British Prime Minister David Lloyd George
