= Athletics at the 1983 Pan American Games – Men's hammer throw =

Men's hammer throw at the Pan American Games

The men's hammer throw event at the 1983 Pan American Games was held in Caracas, Venezuela on 24 August.

== Results ==
Rank	Name	Nationality	Result	Notes
1st place, gold medalist(s)	Genovevo Morejón	Cuba	65.34	
2nd place, silver medalist(s)	Harold Willers	Canada	64.22	
3rd place, bronze medalist(s)	Alfredo Luis Guillot	Cuba	63.16	
4	Luis Martínez	Puerto Rico	56.52	
5	Andrés Polemil	Dominican Republic	56.12	
	Dave McKenzie	United States	DNS	
	John McArdle	United States	DNS	
