= Harold Willers =

Canadian hammer thrower (born 1958)

Personal information
- Born: Harold Willers; September 2, 1958 (age 67)

Sport
- Sport: Athletics
- Event: Hammer throw
Medal record
Representing Canada
Pan American Games
Silver medal – second place	1983 Caracas	Hammer throw

Harold Willers (born September 2, 1958) is a Canadian former athlete who specialised in the hammer throw.

A Victoria, British Columbia native, Willers attended Claremont Secondary School and took up the hammer throw as a varsity athlete at Simon Fraser University, where he set a record throw of 67.28 m and won three NAIA titles.

Willers was the Canadian national hammer throw champion every year from 1981 to 1984. He featured in two editions of the Commonwealth Games, with his best placing sixth in Brisbane in 1982. At the 1983 Pan American Games in Caracas, Willers claimed a silver medal, behind Cuban Genovevo Morejón.

For over 30 years, Willers was a throwing coach with the Valley Royals Track & Field Club in Abbotsford. He won Athletics Canada's Development Coach of the Year award in 2018 and trained 2024 Olympic finalist Rowan Hamilton.
