= John Pavelich =

Canadian athlete

Personal information
- Born: John Ivan Pavelich; 1924 or 1925 Yugoslavia
- Died: June 1, 1999 (aged 74) British Columbia, Canada

Sport
- Country: Canada
- Sport: Athletics
- Event: Discus / Javelin / Shot put
Medal record
British Empire and Commonwealth Games
Silver medal – second place	1954 Vancouver	Shot put

John Ivan Pavelich (1924/1925 – June 1, 1999) was a Canadian athlete who competed in throwing events.

Pavelich, born in Yugoslavia, was a 1949 graduate of the University of British Columbia and a member of the Vancouver Olympic Club. He was a Canadian national champion in javelin and discus. In 1954, he won a silver medal for shot put at the British Empire and Commonwealth Games, which were being hosted by Vancouver. At the 1955 Pan American Games, Pavelich finished in the top six in both discus and shot put. He also competed at the 1959 Pan American Games.

A physical education teacher by profession, Pavelich married university lecturer Joan (Johnson) and they had three children. One of their daughters, also named Joan, was a national champion in shot put.

== See also ==
- List of Commonwealth Games medallists in athletics (men)
