= Dave Edge =

Canadian long-distance runner

Personal information
- National team: Canada
- Born: November 2, 1954 (age 71) Blackpool, Lancashire, United Kingdom
- Occupation: policeman
- Employer: Royal Canadian Mounted Police
- Spouse: Carey May

Sport
- Sport: Running
Medal record
Men's Athletics
Representing Canada
Maccabiah Games
Silver medal – second place	Israel 1981
Bronze medal – third place	Israel 1981

David Edge (born November 12, 1954, in Blackpool, Lancashire, United Kingdom) is a former long-distance runner, who represented Canada at two consecutive Summer Olympics in the men's marathon.

== Biography ==
In Blackpool, he had been a policeman. He moved to Canada in 1981, and joined the Royal Canadian Mounted Police.

At the 1984 Summer Olympics in Los Angeles, California, he did not finish. Four years later in Seoul, South Korea he finished in 67th place.

He is Jewish, and competed in the 1981 Maccabiah Games, winning a silver medal in the 10,000 m and a bronze medal in the mini-marathon, and in the 1989 Maccabiah Games. Edge won the silver medal at the 1986 Commonwealth Games in the marathon, behind Australia's Robert de Castella.

In 1984, he won the Ottawa Race Weekend marathon, and was the Canadian national marathon champion.

A resident of Newport Beach, California USA, Edge is married to Ireland's former long-distance runner Carey May.

== Achievements ==
Year	Competition	Venue	Position	Event	Notes
Representing Canada
1981	World Cross Country Championships	Madrid	182nd	Senior men's race	38:04
1982	Chicago Marathon	Chicago	4th	Marathon	2:12:25
1982	Fukuoka Marathon	Fukuoka	7th	Marathon	2:12:40
1983	Boston Marathon	Boston	6th	Marathon	2:11:04
1983	Australian Marathon	Sydney	3rd	Marathon	2:14:26
1983	World Championships	Helsinki	24th	Marathon	2:15:43
1983	Fukuoka Marathon	Fukuoka	8th	Marathon	2:11:48
1984	Ottawa Marathon	Ottawa	1st	Marathon (NC)	2:13:19
1984	Olympic Games	Los Angeles	—	Marathon	DNF
1985	Grandma's Marathon	Duluth	2nd	Marathon	2:12:24
1986	Houston Marathon	Houston	2nd	Marathon	2:11:40
1986	Commonwealth Games	Edinburgh	2nd	Marathon	2:11:08
1986	Fukuoka Marathon	Fukuoka	8th	Marathon	2:12:26
1987	London Marathon	London	9th	Marathon	2:11:51
1988	London Marathon	London	17th	Marathon	2:14:10
1988	Olympic Games	Seoul	67th	Marathon	2:32:19

== See also ==
- List of Canadian Track and Field Championships winners
- List of Commonwealth Games medallists in athletics (men)
- List of marathon national champions (men)
