= Scott Cappos =

Canadian shot putter (born 1969)

Personal information
- Born: 13 April 1969 (age 57) Toronto, Canada

Sport
- Sport: Track and field
- Club: Indiana Hoosiers

Scott Cappos (born 13 April 1969) is a retired Canadian shot putter.

Born in Canada, his family migrated to the US and he became a naturalized US citizen. After graduating from Oak Lawn Community High School he competed collegiately for Indiana University Bloomington (Hoosiers), won the Big Ten Conference in 1990 and 1991 and was a three-time All-American.

He won the silver medal at the 1994 Jeux de la Francophonie, finished fifth at the 1994 Commonwealth Games and fifth at the 1995 Pan American Games. He became Canadian champion in 1992, 1993, 1994 and 1995, in between Peter Dajia and Brad Snyder.

Cappos coached the Iowa Hawkeyes for eighteen years before joining the Nebraska Cornhuskers as assistant throwing coach.
