= Lucille Elizabeth Bishop Smith =

African American entrepreneur, chef and inventor

- Born: Lucille Elizabeth Bishop; September 5, 1892; Crockett, Texas, U.S.
- Died: January 12, 1985 (aged 92); Brenham, Texas, U.S.
- Education: Huston–Tillotson University
- Occupation: Entrepreneur
- Spouse: Ulysses Samuel Smith
- Children: 3

Lucille Elizabeth Bishop Smith (1892–1985) was an African American entrepreneur, chef, and inventor. She invented the first hot biscuit mix, and has been called "the first African American businesswoman in Texas".

== Early life ==
Lucille Elizabeth Bishop was born September 5, 1892, in Crockett, Texas, to Mary Jackson Bishop and Jesse Bishop. She graduated from Huston–Tillotson University in about 1912 and married her college sweetheart, Ulysses Samuel Smith, who eventually became known as the "Barbecue King of the Southwest." The couple moved to Fort Worth and established a catering business. They had three children together.

== Career ==
In 1927, Lucille was appointed the coordinator of Fort Worth's vocational education program. She also managed the kitchen at Camp Waldemar, a summer camp for well off girls. Ten years later, she received a similar position at Prairie View A&M, and in 1952 established one of the first college commercial food & technology programs. In 1941, Smith published her first cookbook, Lucille's Treasure Chest of Fine Foods.

For a fundraiser, Smith developed "Lucille's All Purpose Hot Roll Mix" which became a commercial success. In one month, she made about $800 in profits, which she donated to St. Andrew's Methodist Church in Fort Worth. The mix became such a success that she was soon selling 200 cases of it a week. The Cleburne Times-Review reported, "Grocery stores began placing orders for cases of the mix. By April of '48, the orders were for more than 200 cases per week of the 14-ounce boxes. Twenty-one different products [recipes] could be made from the base. The product paved the way for the convenience cooking we know today." She also marketed chili biscuits that were offered on American Airlines flights and in Lyndon Johnson's White House. Smith was the first food editor of Sepia magazine, a Fort Worth-based publication aimed at Black Americans.

In 1965, Smith baked more than 300 fruit cakes in one week to send to every enlisted person serving in the Vietnam War from Tarrant County. Fort Worth proclaimed a "Lucille B. Smith day" in her honor in 1966. Smith became the first African American woman on the Fort Worth Chamber of Commerce, and served on a committee to decorate the Chamber's room at the new Tarrant County Convention Center in 1968. In 1969, she was named to the Governor's Commission on the Status of Women.

Throughout her life, Smith fundraised for various causes, and advocated for better conditions for the urban poor. Lucille Smith founded Lucille B. Smith's Fine Foods, Inc. in 1974 when she was 82 years old. She counted Eleanor Roosevelt and Joe Lewis as her customers. Smith was twice named a Merit Mother of Texas by the Texas Mothers Association and received Prairie View A&M's Distinguished Partner in Progress Award.

== Death and legacy ==
Lucille Bishop Smith died January 12, 1985, in Brenham, Texas. Following a service at St. Andrew's Methodist Church, where she had been a member for over seventy years, she was buried in the Smith family plot in the New Trinity Cemetery in Haltom City, Texas.

In 1941, Smith published a cookbook Lucille’s Treasure Chest of Fine Foods, which was reprinted many times, and the 1960s version was printed on 400 index cards and sold in a recipe box. It is a collector's item and hard to find.

== Commemoration ==
In 2012, the restaurant Lucille’s opened in Houston, founded by Smith's great-grandchildren, Chris and Ben Williams, grandchildren of her daughter Gladys Hogan as a dedication to her. Additionally a non-profit, Lucille’s 1913, helping feed the indigent community in Houston and training people for jobs.

The Texas Institute for the Preservation of History and Culture created an exhibition called “Biscuits and Business: The Legacy of Lucille Smith and Southern Black Chefs” in her memory in 2019.

== Publications ==
- Smith, Lucille E. (1945). Lucille's Treasure Chest of Fine Foods. Fort Worth, TX: Lucille Smith. OCLC 225884947.

== See also ==
- History of African Americans in Dallas–Fort Worth
