= Paul Just =

Canadian pole vaulter

Personal information
- Born: February 29, 1964 (age 62) Toronto, Ontario, Canada

Sport
- Sport: Track and field

Paul Just (born February 29, 1964) is a retired pole vaulter from Canada, who was born in Germany. He represented Canada in the men's pole vault event at the 1988 Summer Olympics, finishing in 17th place (5.30 m). Just is a resident of Toronto, Ontario.
