= Karl-Heinz Merschenz =

Canadian racewalker

Personal information
- Nationality: Canadian
- Born: 1 November 1936 (age 88) Berlin, Germany

Sport
- Sport: Athletics
- Event: Racewalking

Karl-Heinz Merschenz (born 1 November 1936) is a Canadian racewalker. He competed at the 1968 Summer Olympics and the 1972 Summer Olympics. He competed at the Pan American Games in 1967 and positioned fourth place in the 50km walk. At the 1968 Summer Olympics in Mexico City, he positioned 18 in the 20km walk and positioned 9 in the 50km walk. At the 1972 Summer Olympics in Munich, he did not complete the race.
