= Michelle Hastick =

Canadian triple jumper

Personal information
- Nationality: Canadian
- Born: September 16, 1973 (age 53)

Sport
- Country: Canada
- Sport: Track and field
- Event: Triple jump

Michelle Hastick (born September 16, 1973) is a Canadian athletics competitor. In 2001, she competed in the women's triple jump event at the 2001 World Championships in Athletics held in Edmonton, Canada. She did not qualify to compete in the final.

In 1998, she finished in 6th place in the women's triple jump at the 1998 Commonwealth Games held in Kuala Lumpur, Malaysia. She also competed in the women's long jump event.
