= Diane Jones-Konihowski =

Canadian pentathlete (born 1951)

Personal information
- Nationality: Canadian
- Born: Diane Jones; March 7, 1951 (age 75) Vancouver, British Columbia, Canada

Sport
- Country: Canada
- Sport: Women's pentathlon
- Retired: 1983
Medal record
Women's Athletics
Representing Canada
Commonwealth Games
Gold medal – first place	1978 Edmonton	Pentathlon
Pan American Games
Gold medal – first place	1975 Mexico City	Pentathlon
Gold medal – first place	1979 San Juan	Pentathlon
Universiade
Bronze medal – third place	1973 Moscow	Pentathlon

Diane Jones-Konihowski, CM (born March 7, 1951) is a former Canadian pentathlete who was the 1978 Commonwealth Champion and won two gold medals at two Pan-American Games, as well as representing Canada at two Summer Olympics.

== Biography ==
Jones-Konihowski was born in Vancouver, British Columbia, and raised in Saskatoon, Saskatchewan. She graduated from the College of Education at the University of Saskatchewan. Diane took her first international medal at the 1969 Pacific Conference Games, a bronze in the high jump. She competed for Canada at the 1972 Summer Olympics, placing tenth she took the bronze medal at the World Student Games in Moscow in 1973; and the 1976 Summer Olympics, placing sixth. Considered to be a medal contender for the 1980 Summer Olympics in Moscow, a third appearance at the Olympics failed to materialize as Canada was one of the countries that chose to boycott the games due to the Soviet intervention in Afghanistan. Although Jones-Konihowski considered competing as an individual, she ultimately decided against it. She won a gold medal in the pentathlon at the 1975 and 1979 Pan Am Games and 1978 Commonwealth Games. She was also the winner of the pentathlon at the Liberty Bell Classic (alternate Olympic competition) in 1980. Two weeks after the Moscow Olympics, Diane competed in the pentathlon in Germany; she won the gold beating all the Olympic Medallist. She retired from competition in 1983. She was Chef de Mission of the 2000 Canadian Olympic Team in Sydney, Australia.

In 1978, she was made a Member of the Order of Canada. She was inducted into the Saskatchewan Sports Hall of Fame in 1980, the Canadian Olympic Sports Hall of Fame in 1996, and the Alberta Sports Hall of Fame and Museum in 2002. She was also awarded the Bobbie Rosenfeld Award and the Velma Springstead Trophy. In 2002, she was awarded an honorary degree from the University of Saskatchewan. In 2020/21, she was awarded the Order of Sport, marking her induction into Canada's Sports Hall of Fame.

In 1977, she married John Konihowski, a professional football player for the Edmonton Eskimos and the Winnipeg Blue Bombers.

She lives in Calgary, Alberta, where she is the President and partner of Premiere Executive Suites. In 2005, she was elected to the board of directors of the Canadian Olympic Committee.
