= Gordon Crosby =

Canadian sprinter (1927–2019)

Personal information
- Born: 21 March 1927 Toronto, Ontario, Canada
- Died: 3 January 2019 (aged 91) Kitchener, Ontario, Canada

Sport
- Sport: Athletics
- Event: 4 × 100 metres relay

Gordon Crosby (21 March 1927 – 3 January 2019) was a Canadian sprinter. He competed in the men's 4 × 100 metres relay at the 1952 Summer Olympics.
