= Ron Miller (pole vaulter) =

Canadian pole vaulter

Personal information
- Nationality: Canadian
- Born: 28 August 1929
- Died: 18 April 2010 (aged 80)

Sport
- Sport: Athletics
- Event: Pole vault

Ronald Rowan Miller (28 August 1929 – 18 April 2010) was a Canadian athlete. He competed in the men's pole vault at the 1952 Summer Olympics.
