= Wilf Wedmann =

Canadian high jumper (1948–2021)

Medal record

Representing Canada

Men's Athletics

Pan American Games
Silver medal – second place	Cali 1971	High Jump

Wilf Wedmann (April 17, 1948 – November 2021) was a Canadian high jumper, who represented his native country at the 1968 Summer Olympics in Mexico City, Mexico. A resident of Gloucester, British Columbia, he claimed the silver medal in the men's high jump event at the 1971 Pan American Games in Cali, Colombia. Wedmann died in November 2021, at the age of 73.
