= Jim Buchanan (long jumper) =

Canadian long jumper

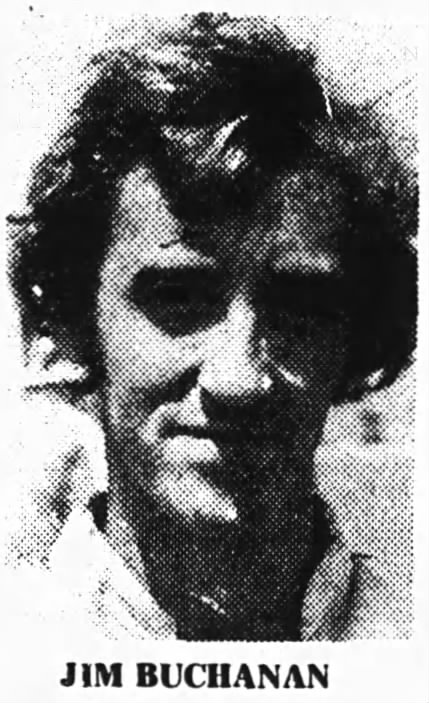

Personal information
- Born: 22 July 1955 Ottawa, Ontario, Canada
- Died: 7 June 1977 (aged 21)

Sport
- Sport: Athletics
- Event: Long jump

Jim Buchanan (22 July 1955 – 7 June 1977) was a Canadian athlete. He competed in the men's long jump at the 1976 Summer Olympics.

Buchanan died in a car accident near Sharbot Lake on 7 June 1977, just before leaving on a European tour to prepare for the 1980 Summer Olympics.
