= Walter Fedorick =

Canadian long-distance runner

Personal information
- Born: Walter Alexander Fedorick; 30 January 1918 Hamilton, Ontario, Canada
- Died: 18 March 1989 (aged 71) Hamilton, Ontario, Canada

Sport
- Sport: Long-distance running
- Event: Marathon

Walter Alexander Fedorick (30 January 1918 – 18 March 1989) was a Canadian long-distance runner. He competed in the marathon at the 1948 Summer Olympics. Fedorick finished tenth in the 1950 British Empire Games marathon and twelfth in the 1950 British Empire Games 6 miles.
