= Tina Connelly =

Canadian long-distance runner

Personal information
- Born: August 16, 1970 (age 55) New Westminster, British Columbia, Canada

Sport
- Sport: Track and field
Medal record
Women's athletics
Representing Canada
Pan American Games
Bronze medal – third place	1999 Winnipeg	10,000 metres

Tina Connelly (born August 16, 1970) is a retired female track and field athlete from Canada, who competed in the long-distance events. She represented her native country at the 2000 Summer Olympics, finishing in 37th place in the women's 10,000 metres. Connelly claimed the bronze medal in the women's 10,000 metres at the 1999 Pan American Games in Winnipeg.

== Achievements ==
- All results regarding marathon, unless stated otherwise

Year	Competition	Venue	Position	Notes
Representing Canada
2001	World Championships	Edmonton, Canada	33rd	2:40:16
