= Genovevo Morejón =

Cuban hammer thrower

Genovevo Morejón (born 3 January 1954) is a Cuban former track and field athlete who competed in the hammer throw. His personal best was 70.22 m (230 ft 4 1/2 in), set in Havana on 20 June 1980. His greatest honour was the gold medal at the Pan American Games in 1983, becoming the first Caribbean man to win that title.

Morejón was also a gold medallist at the 1982 Central American and Caribbean Games and 1983 Central American and Caribbean Championships in Athletics – the latter included a championship record of 67.60 m (221 ft 9 1/4 in). He also won minor medals at Pan American and Central American and Caribbean level, as well as a silver at the 1983 Ibero-American Championships in Athletics.

== International competitions ==
Year	Competition	Venue	Position	Notes
1974	Central American and Caribbean Games	Santo Domingo, Dominican Republic	3rd	57.58 m
1978	Central American and Caribbean Games	Medellín, Colombia	2nd	69.14 m
1979	Pan American Games	San Juan, Puerto Rico	3rd	67.66 m
1982	Central American and Caribbean Games	Havana, Cuba	1st	67.10 m
1983	Central American and Caribbean Championships	Havana, Cuba	1st	67.60 m CR
1983	Pan American Games	Caracas, Venezuela	1st	65.34 m
1983	Ibero-American Championships	Barcelona, Spain	2nd	65.28 m
