= Oral Ogilvie =

Canadian triple jumper (born 1969)

Personal information
- Nationality: Canadian
- Born: 21 January 1969 (age 57) Jamaica

Sport
- Sport: Athletics
- Event: Triple jump

Oral Ogilvie (born 21 January 1969) is a Canadian athlete. He competed in the men's triple jump at the 1992 Summer Olympics.
