= Fred Ruish =

Canadian football player and track and field athlete

Profile
- Position: Fullback

Personal information
- Born: November 10, 1933
- Died: February 15, 2009 (aged 75); Niagara Falls, Ontario, Canada
- Listed height: 6 ft 2 in (1.88 m)
- Listed weight: 205 lb (93 kg)

Career history
- 1953–1954: Hamilton Tiger-Cats

Awards and highlights
- Grey Cup champion (1953)

Alfred Ruish (November 10, 1933 – February 15, 2009) was a Canadian professional football player who played for the Hamilton Tiger-Cats. He won the Grey Cup with Hamilton in 1953. He previously played football at Stamford Collegiate in Niagara Falls. He is a member of the Niagara Sports Wall of Fame.

He also competed in track and field, setting Canadian records in the shot put and discus throw. He won the shot put title at the Canadian Track and Field Championships in 1952.
