= Borys Chambul =

Canadian discus thrower (born 1953)

Personal information
- Born: February 17, 1953 (age 73) Toronto, Ontario, Canada
Medal record
Men's athletics
Representing Canada
Commonwealth Games
Gold medal – first place	1978 Edmonton	Discus throw

Borys Chambul (born February 17, 1953) is a retired discus thrower, who represented Canada at the 1976 Summer Olympics. He won the gold medal in the men's discus throw event at the 1978 Commonwealth Games.

Competing for the Washington Huskies track and field team, Chambul won the discus throw at the 1976 NCAA Division I Outdoor Track and Field Championships.
