= Vic Frank =

American discus thrower (1927–2010)

Personal information
- Nationality: American
- Born: April 4, 1927
- Died: April 6, 2010 (aged 83)

Sport
- Sport: Athletics
- Event: Discus throw

Vic Frank (April 4, 1927 – April 6, 2010) was an American athlete. He competed in the men's discus throw at the 1948 Summer Olympics.

He competed at the 1953 Maccabiah Games.

Competing for the Yale Bulldogs track and field team, Frank won the 1949 NCAA Track and Field Championships in the discus throw.
