= Dianne Gerace =

Canadian pentathlete, high and long jumper (born 1943)

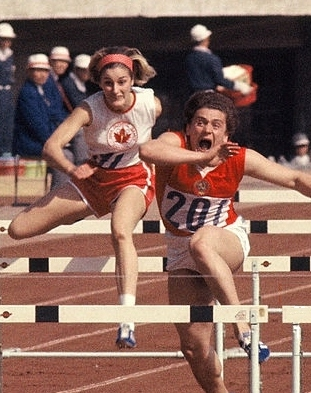
- Gerace behind Irina Press at the 1964 Olympics

Personal information
- Born: October 26, 1943 (age 82) Trail, British Columbia, Canada
- Height: 1.78 m (5 ft 10 in)
- Weight: 68 kg (150 lb)

Sport
- Sport: Athletics
- Event(s): high jump, pentathlon
- Club: Trail
- Coached by: Willi Krause

Achievements and titles
- Personal best(s): 1.75 m (1964 HJ); 4716 (1964, pentathlon)
Medal record
Representing Canada
Pan American Games
Silver medal – second place	1963 São Paulo	High jump

Dianne Roberta Gerace (born October 26, 1943) is a Canadian retired track athlete. She competed at the 1964 Summer Olympics in the high jump and pentathlon and finished in 5th and 15th place, respectively. She won a silver medal in the high jump and finished sixth in the long jump at the 1963 Pan American Games. She is of Italian and Scottish descent.

Gerace is married to Ulrick Fox Sr. They have a son, the actor and former NBA player Rick Fox, and two daughters, model and actress Jeanene Fox and artist and art curator Sarah Fox.
