= Gordon Dickson (athlete) =

Canadian long-distance runner

Personal information
- Born: 2 January 1932 Calgary, Alberta, Canada
- Died: 19 January 2015 (aged 83) Burlington, Ontario, Canada

Sport
- Sport: Long-distance running
- Event: Marathon
Medal record
Men's athletics
Representing Canada
Pan American Games
| Bronze medal – third place | 1959 Chicago | Marathon |

Gordon Elford Dickson (2 January 1932 – 19 January 2015) was a Canadian long-distance runner. He competed in the marathon at the 1960 Summer Olympics. Dickson ran at both the 1958 and 1962 Commonwealth Games, placing 5th in 1958 and 12th in 1962 in the marathon. He won a bronze medal in the marathon at the 1959 Pan American Games.
