= Elaine Silburn =

Canadian sprinter (1928–2022)

Personal information
- Nationality: Canadian
- Born: 29 July 1928 Victoria, British Columbia, Canada
- Died: November 2022 (aged 94)

Sport
- Sport: Athletics
- Events: Long jump High jump

Elaine Silburn (29 July 1928 – November 2022) was a Canadian athlete. She competed in the women's long jump and the women's high jump at the 1948 Summer Olympics. Her granddaughter, Katrina Young, participated at the 2016 Summer Olympics in the diving competition representing the United States.
