= Peter Spir =

Canadian middle-distance runner

Personal information
- Nationality: Canadian
- Born: 6 November 1955 (age 70) Manchester, Great Britain

Sport
- Sport: Middle-distance running
- Event: 1500 metres

Peter Spir (born 6 November 1955) is a Canadian middle-distance runner. He competed in the men's 1500 metres at the 1976 Summer Olympics.
