= Hans Moks =

Canadian-Estonian javelin thrower

Hans Moks (15 October 1923 – 11 October 2011) was an Estonian-Canadian athletics competitor.

He was born in Sootaga Rural Municipality. In 1942 he graduated from Hugo Treffner Gymnasium. In 1944 he fled to Sweden. In 1954 he moved to Canada.

He began his sporting career at the age of 14. He focused on javelin throw. 1952–1958 he was the best javelin thrower in Canada. He won bronze medal at 1958 British Empire and Commonwealth Games. His record was 72.78 (1955).
