= Ken Wenman =

Canadian pole vaulter

Personal information
- Born: 9 March 1955 (age 71) Vancouver, Canada

Sport
- Sport: Athletics
- Event: Pole vault

Ken Wenman (born 9 March 1955) is a Canadian athlete. He competed in the men's pole vault at the 1976 Summer Olympics.
