= John Ross (runner) =

Canadian middle-distance runner (1931–2022)

Personal information
- Born: 13 November 1931 Oakville, Canada
- Died: 1 November 2022 (aged 90) Sarasota, Florida

Sport
- Sport: Middle-distance running
- Event: 800 metres

John Ross (13 November 1931 – 1 November 2022) was a Canadian middle-distance runner. He competed in the men's 800 metres at the 1952 Summer Olympics.

Ross ran for the Michigan Wolverines track and field team at the University of Michigan.
