= Paul Collins (runner) =

Canadian long-distance runner (1926–1995)

Paul Albert Collins (July 22, 1926 – January 31, 1995) was a long-distance runner from Canada, who was born in the London Borough of Lewisham. He represented his native country in the men's marathon at the 1952 Summer Olympics in Helsinki, Finland, where he finished in 40th place.

Collins won the national title in the classic distance three times: in 1949 (Toronto), 1950 (Verdun, Quebec) and 1952 (Saint Hyacinthe). He finished sixth in the 1950 British Empire Games marathon and tenth in the 1950 British Empire Games six miles event.

== Achievements ==
| Year | Competition | Venue | Position | Event | Notes |
Representing Canada
| 1952 | Olympic Games | Helsinki, Finland | 40th | Marathon | 2:45:58.0 |
