= Jay Dahlgren =

Canadian javelin thrower (born 1948)

Personal information
- Born: December 7, 1948 (age 77) Vancouver, British Columbia
Medal record
Women's athletics
Representing Canada
Pan American Games
Bronze medal – third place	Winnipeg 1967	Javelin Throw

Judith "Jay" Dahlgren (born December 7, 1948, in Vancouver, British Columbia) is a retired javelin thrower from Canada, who represented her native country at the 1968 Summer Olympics. She claimed the bronze medal in the women's javelin throw event at the 1967 Pan American Games in Winnipeg, Manitoba, Canada.

She also competed at the Commonwealth Games, winning the bronze medal at the 1966 and 1970 Games.
