= Georgette Reed =

Canadian athlete

Personal information
- Born: 26 January 1967 (age 59) Regina, Saskatchewan, Canada

Sport
- Sport: Athletics
- Events: Shot put, discus

Georgette Reed (born 26 January 1967) is a Canadian former athlete. She competed in the women's shot put at the 1992 Summer Olympics. She is the daughter of former Saskatchewan Roughriders football player George Reed.

Reed competed for the Washington State Cougars track and field team in the NCAA.
