= Michael Nepinak =

Canadian athletics competitor

Personal information
- Born: May 3, 1953 (age 73) Windsor, Ontario, Canada

Sport
- Sport: Track and field

Michael Nepinak (born May 3, 1953) is a Canadian former track and field athlete who competed in triple jump and is a member of the Pine Creek First Nation. He excelled in his sport while attending the University of Pennsylvania in Philadelphia, Pennsylvania. In 1978 he set a new Canadian record in triple jump at the Commonwealth Games with a jump of 16.24 metres; this record stood for eight years until it was broken by George Wright in 1987. In 1980, he was named to the Canadian Olympic Team for the 1980 Summer Olympics in Moscow, Russia. He was twice champion at the Canadian Track and Field Championships, winning in 1978 and 1980.

== Career ==
=== University of Pennsylvania ===
Michael Nepinak became a star track and field athlete while attending the University of Pennsylvania in 1977. As a third year student, Nepinak set an Ivy League outdoor track and field record in the triple jump, with a jump of 16.02 metres. During the next indoor season he continued his dominance, breaking the indoor record with a jump of 15.85 metres. One of Nepinak's biggest honours was when he was named to All-American status as he was voted the Outstanding Performer of the Heptagonal Indoor meet in 1978.

=== Commonwealth Games ===
After his record-breaking season at the University of Pennsylvania, he competed for Team Canada at the Commonwealth Games in 1978. At the games, he managed to jump 16.24m which set a Canadian national record that stood for 8 years, only to be broken by George Wright in 1987. This performance was the best of Nepinak's career, and ranks him 6th all-time for outdoor triple jump in Canada. This performance also stood for twenty-four years as the University of Pennsylvania's outdoor triple jump record before being passed by Tuan Wreh in 2002. This performance still stands 2nd overall at the University of Pennsylvania.

=== 1980 Summer Olympics ===
In 1980, Nepinak became a member of Canada's Olympic Team. Unfortunately, Nepinak was never able to compete in the Olympics due to the boycott over the Soviet–Afghan War.

== Results ==
Year	Competition	Location	Result
1976	Canadian Track and Field Championships	Regina	15.05m
1977	Canadian Track and Field Championships	Sudbury	15.62m
1977	USA–USSR Track and Field Dual Meet Series	Toronto	15.70m
1978	Canadian Track and Field Championships	Montreal	15.28m
1978	Commonwealth Games	Edmonton	5th – 16.24m
1979	Canadian Track and Field Championships	Sherbrooke	15.26m
1980	Canadian Track and Field Championships	Sherbrooke	16.39m

== Personal life ==
Nepinak is a member of the Pine Creek First Nation and spent the first 18 years of his life as a ward of the Children's Aid Society. He was invited to a tryout with the Toronto Argonauts of the Canadian Football League in 1979 despite not playing a game of organised football in four years. However, he did play on the junior varsity team at the University of Illinois prior to transferring to the University of Pennsylvania.

== Awards and achievements ==
In 2002, Nepinak was a National Aboriginal Achievement Award recipient. Now called Indspire Awards, they are given out to individuals who encourage excellence in the Aboriginal community. One year later in 2003, Nepinak was given an Honorary Doctor of Laws from the University of Windsor.
