= Phil Olsen (javelin thrower) =

Canadian javelin thrower (1957–2020)

Personal information
- Born: Philip Einar Olsen; 31 January 1957 Nanaimo, British Columbia
- Died: 15 March 2020 (aged 63) Nanaimo, British Columbia

Sport
- Country: Canada
- Sport: Men's athletics
Medal record
Commonwealth Games
Gold medal – first place	1978 Edmonton	Javelin

Philip Einar Olsen (31 January 1957 – 15 March 2020) was a Canadian athlete, a javelin thrower who competed in the finals in the 1976 Summer Olympics and won a gold medal at the 1978 Commonwealth Games. One of the most decorated track and field athletes in Canada, Olsen still holds numerous provincial and national records in the javelin.

== Biography ==
Born in Nanaimo, British Columbia, Olsen's career began in 1970 while he attended Woodlands Secondary School. His meteoric rise started in 1973 with a gold medal performance at the Canada Summer Games in Burnaby, British Columbia. Olsen broke a world junior record and was named the most outstanding athlete of the Canada Games. That same year, Olsen also won the prestigious Viscount Alexander Award for being the outstanding junior athlete in Canada. In 1974 as a grade 11 student, Olsen won the BC high school javelin gold medal with a record throw that still stands today.

Upon graduation from Nanaimo District Secondary School, Olsen was recruited by the University of Tennessee — one of the elite track and field programs in the United States. During his brilliant four-year career at university, Olsen was a four-time All South Eastern Conference performer and four-time All-American. His college highlight was his National Collegiate Athletic Association (NCAA) gold medal championship performance in 1976. Olsen represented Canada on the international stage while attending Tennessee. As 11 times Canadian champion, Olsen represented Canada at many international events. At the 1976 Summer Olympics in Montreal, Quebec, Olsen's preliminary and qualifying throw of over 89 meters put him in the top three of the 37 competitors. He placed 11th in the finals the following day but at the age of 19 much more was to come.

Following his senior season at Tennessee, Olsen represented Canada at the 1978 Commonwealth Games in Edmonton, Alberta. His gold performance solidified his stature as one of the world's best javelin throwers. Queen Elizabeth presented Olsen with his gold medal. Only the boycott of the 1980 Summer Olympics in Moscow, Russia, stopped Olsen from possibly winning an Olympic medal. As the number three-ranked javelin thrower in the world at that time, Olsen had a legitimate chance of winning an Olympic medal. Olsen would go on to compete at the 1982 Commonwealth Games in Brisbane, Australia, placing fourth. Only an injury to his right shoulder prevented him from competing at the 1984 Summer Olympics in Los Angeles, California. He officially retired from the sport he loved in August 1985.

In 1994 a panel of Canadian sports writers named Olsen the greatest javelin thrower in Canadian history. In 2008, Olsen joined Gerald Kazanowski and Brenda Taylor—among others—as inaugural inductees into his home town's Sports Hall of Fame. Olsen was NCAA champion and four-time All-American at the University of Tennessee.

Olsen died 15 March 2020 in Nanaimo from a heart attack.
