= Ergas Leps =

Canadian athlete (born 1939)

Personal information
- Nationality: Canadian
- Born: 25 August 1939 (age 86) Pärnu, Estonia

Sport
- Sport: Middle-distance running
- Event(s): 800m, 1500m

Ergas Leps (born 25 August 1939) is an Estonian-born Canadian athlete. He competed at the 1960 Summer Olympics and the 1964 Summer Olympics.
