= Bob Finlay =

Canadian long-distance runner

Personal information
- Full name: Robert Finlay
- Nationality: Canadian
- Born: 3 August 1943 (age 82) London, Great Britain

Sport
- Sport: Long-distance running
- Event: 5000 metres

Robert Finlay (born 3 August 1943) is a Canadian long-distance runner. He competed in the 5000 metres at the 1968 Summer Olympics and the 1972 Summer Olympics.
