= John Konihowski =

Canadian football player (born 1950)

Profile
- Position: Wide receiver

Personal information
- Born: January 6, 1950 (age 76); Moose Jaw, Saskatchewan, Canada
- Listed height: 6 ft 3 in (1.91 m)
- Listed weight: 190 lb (86 kg)

Career information
- College: Saskatchewan

Career history
- 1974–1980: Edmonton Eskimos
- 1981–1982: Winnipeg Blue Bombers

Awards and highlights
- 4× Grey Cup champion (1975, 1978−1980)

John Konihowski (born January 6, 1950) is a former Canadian Football League (CFL) wide receiver who played nine seasons for the Edmonton Eskimos and Winnipeg Blue Bombers. He was a part of four Grey Cup championships with the Eskimos. Konihowski played college football at Brigham Young University and at the University of Saskatchewan, where he was also a track star. He is married to former Canadian pentathlete Diane Jones-Konihowski.

In track and field, he won two national titles at the Canadian Track and Field Championships: taking gold in the 400-meter hurdles in 1972 and the triple jump in 1970.
