= Cory Siermachesky =

Canadian retired high jumper (born 1969)

Personal information
- Born: 20 August 1969 (age 56) Temiskaming Shores, Ontario, Canada

Sport
- Sport: Track and field

Cory Siermachesky (born 20 August 1969) is a Canadian retired high jumper.

He finished fourth at the 1994 Commonwealth Games, in a new career best jump of 2.28 metres.
