= Alice Whitty =

Canadian high jumper

Medal record

Women's athletics

Representing Canada

Pan American Games
Silver medal – second place	1959 Chicago	High Jump

Commonwealth Games
Bronze medal – third place	1954 Vancouver	High Jump

Alice Ann Doreen Simicak (née Whitty; March 24, 1934 – January 7, 2017) was a female high jumper from Canada, who represented her native country at the 1956 Summer Olympics in Melbourne, Australia. A resident of Richmond, British Columbia, she claimed the silver medal in the women's high jump event at the 1959 Pan American Games, alongside Chile's Renata Friedrichs.

Whitty died on January 7, 2017, in Richmond at the age of 82.
