= Leo Roininen =

Canadian javelin thrower and shot putter

Leo Johannes Roininen (16 July 1928 – 21 April 2002) was a Canadian javelin thrower and shot putter who competed in the 1948 Summer Olympics. He was born in Toronto and died in Sudbury.
