= Catherine Bond-Mills =

Canadian heptathlete

Personal information
- Born: 20 September 1967 (age 58) Woodstock, Ontario, Canada

Sport
- Sport: Track and field
Medal record
Representing Canada
Commonwealth Games
Bronze medal – third place	1994 Victoria	Heptathlon

Catherine Louise Bond-Mills (born 20 September 1967) is a Canadian retired track and field athlete who specialised in the heptathlon. She represented her country at two Summer Olympics, in 1992 and 1996, as well as three World Championships.

== Competition record ==
Year	Competition	Venue	Position	Event	Notes
Representing Canada
1989	Jeux de la Francophonie	Casablanca, Morocco	2nd	Heptathlon	5588 pts
1990	Commonwealth Games	Auckland, New Zealand	7th	Heptathlon	5760 pts
1991	Pan American Games	Havana, Cuba	7th	High jump	1.75 m
1991	Pan American Games	Havana, Cuba	–	Heptathlon	DNF
1992	Olympic Games	Barcelona, Spain	21st	Heptathlon	5897 pts
1993	World Championships	Stuttgart, Germany	–	Heptathlon	DNF
1994	Hypo-Meeting	Götzis, Austria	8th	Heptathlon	6206 pts
1994	Commonwealth Games	Victoria, British Columbia, Canada	13th (q)	Long jump	6.01 m
1994	Commonwealth Games	Victoria, British Columbia, Canada	3rd	Heptathlon	6193 pts
1995	World Championships	Gothenburg, Sweden	–	Heptathlon	DNF
1996	Olympic Games	Atlanta, United States	25th	Heptathlon	5235 pts
1998	Commonwealth Games	Kuala Lumpur, Malaysia	4th	Heptathlon	5875 pts
1999	Pan American Games	Winnipeg, Manitoba, Canada	5th	Heptathlon	5714 pts
1999	World Championships	Seville, Spain	18th	Heptathlon	5730 pts

== Personal bests ==
Outdoor

- 200 metres – 24.79 (-0.2 m/s) (Stuttgart 1993)
- 800 metres – 2:12.57 (Seville 1999)
- 100 metres hurdles – 13.92 (-0.2 m/s) (Gothenburg 1995)
- High jump – 1.80 (Gothenburg 1995)
- Long jump – 5.61 (-0.4 m/s) (Seville 1999)
- Shot put – 13.56 (Seville 1999)
- Javelin throw – 37.28 (Seville 1999)
- Heptathlon – 6193 (Victoria 1994)

Indoor

- Pentathlon – 4309 (Edmonton 1999)
