= Daundre Barnaby =

Canadian runner (1990–2015)

Personal information
- Born: 9 December 1990 Saint Ann's Bay, Jamaica
- Died: 27 March 2015 (aged 24) Saint Kitts, Saint Kitts and Nevis
- Height: 1.85 m (6 ft 1 in)

Sport
- Country: Canada
- Sport: Athletics
- Event: 400m
- Club: Project Athletics

Daundre Barnaby (9 December 1990 – 27 March 2015) was a Canadian track runner who specialised in the 400m. Born in Jamaica, he competed for the Mississippi State Bulldogs and ran for Canada at the 2012 Summer Olympics in London, finishing 6th in his heat in the 400m. He also competed for Canada at the 2014 Commonwealth Games, reaching the semifinals.

Barnaby disappeared on March 27, 2015 while swimming in the ocean at a training camp in Saint Kitts, and was declared dead later that same day.

His personal best time in the 400 metres was 45.47 seconds, achieved in May 2013 in Greensboro, NC.
