= Dominique Bilodeau =

Canadian javelin thrower (born 1979)

Personal information
- Born: 14 May 1979 (age 46)

Sport
- Country: Canada
- Sport: Track and field
- Event: Javelin throw

Dominique Bilodeau (born 14 May 1979) is a Canadian javelin thrower. In 2001, she competed in the women's javelin throw at the 2001 World Championships in Athletics held in Edmonton, Alberta, Canada. She did not qualify to compete in the final.
