= Dan Shaughnessy (athlete) =

Canadian long-distance runner

Personal information
- Full name: Daniel Shaughnessy
- Nationality: Canadian
- Born: 8 September 1944 (age 81)

Sport
- Sport: Long-distance running
- Event: 10,000 metres

Daniel Shaughnessy (born 8 September 1944) is a Canadian long-distance runner. He competed in the men's 10,000 metres at the 1976 Summer Olympics.
