= Carmen Ionesco =

Romanian-Canadian shot putter and discus thrower

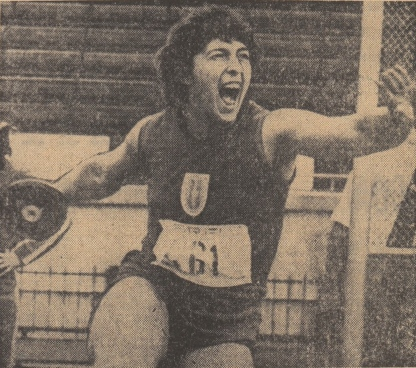
Carmen Ionescu

Carmen Ionesco (birth name Carmen Ionescu; born July 28, 1951, in Bucharest, Romania) is a retired discus thrower and shot putter, who competed for Romania and Canada at the Summer Olympics.

She represented Romania in her first Olympic appearance, at Munich in 1972. Following her emigration to Canada, Ionesco competed for Canada at two Commonwealth Games (1978 and 1982), the 1979 Pan American Games, and the 1984 Summer Olympic Games in Los Angeles.

Her younger sister Florența competed for Romania in the 1980 and 1984 Summer Olympics.

== Achievements ==
Year	Competition	Venue	Position	Event
Representing Romania
1972	Olympic Games	Munich, West Germany	7th	Discus
Representing Canada
1978	Commonwealth Games	Edmonton, Canada	2nd	Shot Put
1978	Commonwealth Games	Edmonton, Canada	1st	Discus
1979	Pan American Games	San Juan, Puerto Rico	3rd	Shot Put
1979	Pan American Games	San Juan, Puerto Rico	3rd	Discus
1982	Commonwealth Games	Brisbane, Australia	6th	Shot Put
1982	Commonwealth Games	Brisbane, Australia	4th	Discus
1984	Olympic Games	Los Angeles, United States	12th	Shot Put
1984	Olympic Games	Los Angeles, United States	13th	Discus
