= Art Jackes =

Canadian high jumper

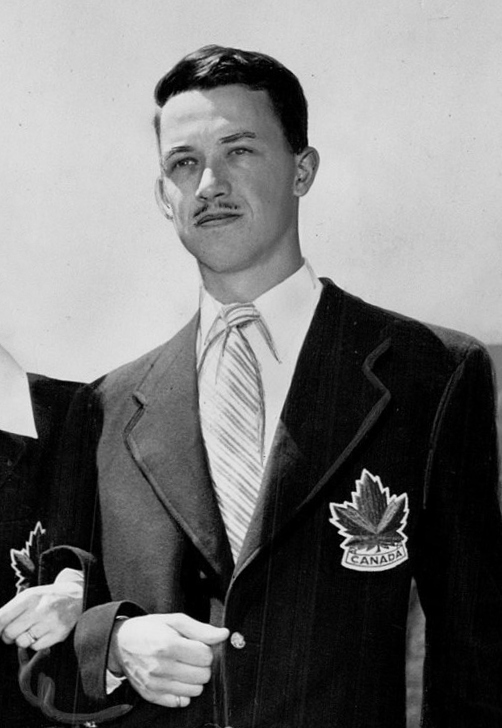
- Jackes in 1948

Personal information
- Nickname: Art
- Born: 26 June 1924 Toronto, Canada
- Died: 10 November 2000 (aged 76) Greenbank, Washington, United States
- Education: University of Toronto

Sport
- Sport: Athletics
- Event: High jump
- Club: Toronto West End YMCA

Achievements and titles
- Personal best: 1.955 m (1949)

Arthur M. 'Art' Jackes (26 June 1924 – 10 November 2000) was a Canadian high jumper, 1948–1950.

Whilst at University of Toronto, he cleared 6 feet (1.8 m) in a high-jump demonstration.

In the 1948 Summer Olympics at Wembley Stadium, Jackes came sixth in high jump, behind the winner Australian John Winter.

In the February 1950 British Empire Games, Jackes was the Canadian individual high jump entry, but finished tenth.

He retired around 1950 and later moved to the United States.
