= Lionel Fournier =

Canadian decathlete

Personal information
- Born: 19 March 1917; Pincher Creek, Alberta, Canada
- Died: 3 September 1993 (aged 76); Canmore, Alberta, Canada

Sport
- Sport: Athletics
- Event: Decathlon

Lionel Fournier (19 March 1917 – 3 September 1993) was a Canadian athlete. He competed in the men's decathlon at the 1948 Summer Olympics.
