= Jill Ross-Giffen =

Canadian retired track and field athlete (born 1958)

Personal information
- Nationality: Canadian
- Born: 23 February 1958 (age 68) London, Ontario
- Height: 1.76 m (5 ft 9 1/2 in)
- Weight: 65 kg (143 lb)

Sport
- Country: Canada
- Sport: Athletics
- Event: Heptathlon

Achievements and titles
- Personal best: Heptathlon: 6038 points
Medal record
Representing Canada
Commonwealth Games
Bronze medal – third place	1982 Brisbane	Heptathlon
Pan American Games
Bronze medal – third place	1979 San Juan	Pentathlon

Jill Margaret Ross-Giffen (born 23 February 1958) is a Canadian retired track and field athlete who competed in the heptathlon and women's pentathlon. She represented Canada in the heptathlon at the 1984 Summer Olympics. Ross-Giffen won a bronze medal at the 1979 Pan American Games and at the 1982 Commonwealth Games. She was the former Canadian national record holder in the pentathlon before that record was broken by Brianne Theisen-Eaton.
