= Wanita May =

Canadian high jumper (born 1975)

Personal information
- Born: January 30, 1975 (age 51) Grimsby, Ontario, Canada

Sport
- Sport: Track and field

Wanita May (née Dykstra; born January 30, 1975) is a Canadian high jumper. She started competing at age 16 and participated in World Junior Championships in 1992. She went on to place first in the Canadian Championships in 2000, 2001 and 2003. She holds the U20 Canadian record, U23 Canadian Record of 1.92 m and also the Ontario U20, U23 and U24 records.

== Career ==
May started competing at the age of 16. She broke the Canadian U20 record at the age of 18, jumping 1.92 m, which still currently stands. She attended Kansas State University on a track scholarship, graduating with a bachelor of science degree in Kinesiology. She also competed in the women's pentathlon, breaking the Canadian high jump pentathlon record, and the heptathlon. She was runner-up at the 1994 NCAA Division I Indoor Track and Field Championships, also placing 4th and 6th at NCAAs. She continued to compete after college, representing Canada on numerous occasions. She was elected into the St. Catharines Sports Hall of Fame. Wanita is 1.70 cm tall with a personal best of 1.92 cm. She holds the Canadian women's record for greatest physical height to jump height differential.

She retired in 2005, after the birth of her first child. May is also a writer, publishing under the name of W.J. May. Her debut novel Rae of Hope is the first book in the Chronicles of Kerrigan. She is a USA Today best-selling author.

== Results ==
- 2004 Canadian Olympic Trials 1st
- 2003 Canadian Championships 1st
- 2002 Canadian Championships 4th
- 2001 Canadian Championships 1st
- 2001 Francophone Games 1st
- 2001 World Championships 15th
- 2001 Canadian Championships 1st
- 2000 Canadian Championships 1st
- 1999 Canadian Championships 2nd
- 1997 Canadian Championships 5th
- 1993 Canadian Championships 1st

=== Records ===
- Canadian Jr Record 1.92m
- Canadian U23 Record 1.92m
- Ontario Indoor Record 1.91 (Sr)
