= Nancy McCredie =

Canadian athlete (1945–2021)

Personal information
- Born: February 5, 1945 Belleville, Ontario
- Died: May 1, 2021 (aged 76)
- Height: 177 cm (5 ft 10 in)
- Weight: 172 lb (78 kg)

Sport
- Retired: 1996
Medal record
Women's Athletics
Representing Canada
Pan American Games
Gold medal – first place	1963 São Paulo	Shot Put
Gold medal – first place	1963 São Paulo	Discus Throw
Gold medal – first place	1967 Winnipeg	Shot Put
British Empire and Commonwealth Games
Bronze medal – third place	1966 Kingston	Shot Put

Nancy McCredie (February 5, 1945 – May 1, 2021) was a Canadian female track and field athlete. During her athletic career, she won three gold medals at the Pan American Games and one bronze medal at the Commonwealth Games. McCredie was awarded the Velma Springstead Trophy as the best Canadian female athlete of the year in 1963.

== Career ==
McCredie claimed two gold medals at the 1963 Pan American Games in Brazil and was awarded the Velma Springstead Trophy. McCredie also represented her native country of Canada in two events (discus and shot put) at the 1964 Summer Olympics in Tokyo, Japan.

In 1966, McCredie reported that she was going to retire from sports. At the time of her announcement, she was singing alongside the Benny Louis Orchestra. Before her retirement, McCredie won two final medals in shot put. She was awarded a bronze medal at the 1966 British Empire and Commonwealth Games and a gold at the 1967 Pan American Games. McCredie officially retired in 1968, stating a knee injury as her reason for retirement. During her career, she held the Canadian record in shot put and discus.

In 2001, McCredie moved to Bristol, Quebec and became an artist.

== Awards and achievements ==
In 1968, McCredie was inducted into the Canadian Olympic Hall of Fame. She was also added to the Brampton Sports Hall of Fame in 1983 and the Athletics Ontario Hall of Fame in 2016.

McCredie lived in Brampton during the height of her athletic career, and became the namesake of Nancy McCredie Drive and Nancy McCredie Park.
