= Bill Gairdner =

Canadian athlete (1940–2024)

Personal information
- Born: William Douglas Gairdner; October 19, 1940 Oakville, Ontario, Canada
- Died: January 12, 2024 (aged 83)
Medal record
Men's athletics
Representing Canada
Pan American Games
Silver medal – second place	1963 Sao Paulo	Decathlon

William Douglas Gairdner (October 19, 1940 – January 12, 2024) was a Canadian track and field athlete in the men's 400 m hurdles and the men's decathlon at the 1964 Summer Olympics in Tokyo, Japan. He was awarded a silver medal in decathlon event at the 1963 Pan American Games in Brazil.

Gairdner attended Appleby College in Oakville, and was a resident of Toronto. Following his hurdling career, he applied himself to the field of academia. He gained his first M.A. in 1967 (studying Structural Linguistics at Stanford University) and then earned a second one at the institution in 1969 in English Literature and Creative Writing. A year later he graduated with a Ph.D. in English Literature from Stanford. He was a published author and, among his works, BPS Books have published The Trouble with Canada, The Trouble with Democracy and Oh, Oh, Canada!.

Gairdner died on January 12, 2024, at the age of 83.

== Bibliography ==
- The Trouble with Canada: A Citizen Speaks Out (1990)
- The War Against Family: A Parent Speaks Out (1992)
- The Trouble with Democracy: A Citizen Speaks Out (2001)
- The Book of Absolutes: A Critique of Relativism and a Defence of Universals (2008)
- The Trouble with Canada... Still! : A Citizen Speaks Out (2011)
- The Great Divide: Why Liberals and Conservatives Will Never Agree (2015)
