= Bruce Pirnie =

Canadian shot putter (1942–2024)

Personal information
- Nationality: American
- Citizenship: Canada
- Born: September 20, 1942 Boston, Massachusetts, U.S.
- Died: August 8, 2024 (aged 81)
- Height: 6 ft 6.5 in (199 cm)
- Weight: 309 lb (140 kg)

Sport
- Country: Canada
- Sport: Shot Put
Medal record
Shot Put
1975 Pan American Games
Gold medal – first place	1975 Pan American Games	Shot Put

Bruce Pirnie (September 20, 1942 – August 8, 2024) was a Canadian shot putter who competed in the 1972 Summer Olympics and in the 1976 Summer Olympics. He was a member of the Manitoba Sports Hall of Fame. Pirnie died on August 8, 2024, at the age of 81.
