= Grant McLaren =

Canadian long-distance runner

Personal information
- Nationality: Canadian
- Born: 19 August 1948 (age 77) Toronto, Canada

Sport
- Sport: Long-distance running
- Event: 5000 metres

Grant McLaren (born 19 August 1948) is a Canadian long-distance runner. He competed in the 5000 metres at the 1972 Summer Olympics and the 1976 Summer Olympics.
