= Margaret Tosh =

Canadian javelin thrower

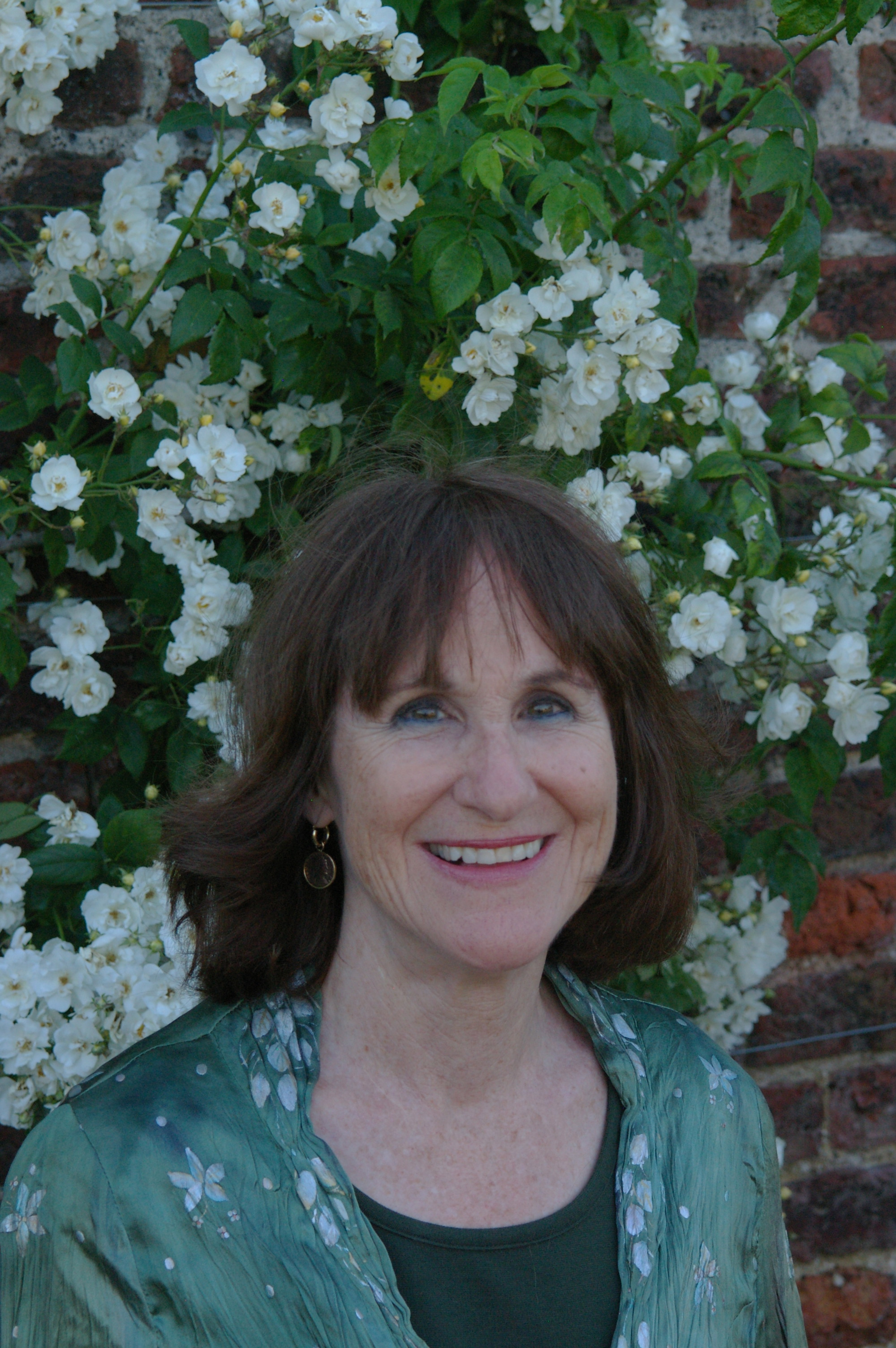
- Tosh in 2009

Personal information
- Full name: Ida Margaret Tosh
- Born: 13 September 1937 (age 88) Mervin, Saskatchewan, Canada

Sport
- Sport: Athletics
- Event: Javelin throw

Ida Margaret Tosh (née George; born 13 September 1937) is a Canadian athlete. She competed in the women's javelin throw at the 1956 Summer Olympics. She continued to compete in athletics throughout her life, setting multiple records in Masters' events.

== Biography ==
Margaret George was born in Mervin, Saskatchewan in 1937. Living in a log cabin on a rural farm, George had to chop wood and walk nearly three miles to school each day. As a child, she played soccer and fastball. While in eighth grade, she began to take up field athletics. Four years later, she set a new school record for the javelin throw, breaking the old record by 18 feet. That throw got her enrolled in an athletics programme with the Young Women's Christian Association. This would then lead to George being selected for the Canadian Olympic Training Program. At the Olympic trials, George set a new Canadian record in the javelin which stood until 1964.

At the 1956 Summer Olympics in Melbourne, George competed in the women's javelin throw, finishing in 16th place.

Following the Olympics, George became a teacher and taught in Harris, Saskatchewan for three years, and married her husband, George Tosh. For the next twenty years, Tosh became a coach and also trained other coaches. Tosh went on to set multiple World Masters' records in several events including javelin, discus, shot put and the hammer throw. In October 2012, Tosh was named the Canadian Masters Athlete of the Month for September, after setting two world records and six national records. The following year, Tosh was bestowed with a Lifetime Achievement Award. In September 2018, Tosh set six national and three world records.
