= Peter Dajia =

Canadian shot putter

Peter Dajia (born January 27, 1964) is a Canadian shot putter.

He was born in Toronto and is Canadian of Greek and Albanian descent.

He competed for Clemson University in 1984, later transferring to the University of Texas, Arlington.

He was banned for doping in June 1986 after failing a drug test, which he appealed. His appeal was rejected and he served an 18-month suspension from the Canadian Track and Field Association. He testified in April 1989 at the Canadian government's inquiry into drug use by athletes that he had been on muscle-building drugs since 1983 but that he appealed the June 1986 drug test because it indicated that he and two teammates used a specific substance they had not taken. He also stated that it was widespread among athletes at the University of Texas, Arlington which he attended. He also claimed he was reinstated by the Canadian Track and Field Assn. only after he threatened to expose anabolic steroid use by sprinter Ben Johnson and other athletes. He spoke with Steve Findlay, an athletes' representative at the CTFA in Ottawa; "I threatened to turn in the world's fastest human being," Dajia said. "I told him I had some information about Ben and Angella (Taylor Issajenko), and Dr. (Jamie) Astaphan, also, and that I'd be speaking to a reporter. I had nothing to lose." Dajia was allowed to compete at the 1988 national championships a month later at Ottawa, where he finished second, but was still banned from competing internationally by the federal government and was not allowed to participate in the Olympics at Seoul.

He became Canadian shot put champion in 1990 and 1991.

Dajia competed at the 1992 Barcelona Olympics, where he placed fourteenth in the shot put.

Dajia later represented Canada at the 2000 Commonwealth Games in Victoria, where he finished eleventh.

After retirement, Dajia coached other athletes and worked with the Phoenix Track Club and South Simcoe Dufferin Track and Field Club in Ontario.

He is a teacher Cardinal Carter Catholic High School in Aurora, Ontario.
