= List of Commonwealth Games medallists in athletics (women) =

This is the complete list of Commonwealth Games medallists in women's athletics from 1934 to 2022.

== Current events ==
=== 100 metres ===
Games	Gold		Silver		Bronze	
1970 (wind: 5.3 m/s)	Raelene Boyle; Australia	11.26 w	Alice Annum; Ghana	11.32 w	Marion Hoffman; Australia	11.36 w
1974	Raelene Boyle; Australia	11.27 GR	Andrea Lynch; England	11.31	Denise Robertson; Australia	11.50
1978 (wind: 2.9 m/s)	Sonia Lannaman; England	11.27 w	Raelene Boyle; Australia	11.35 w	Denise Boyd; Australia	11.37 w
1982	Angella Taylor; Canada	11.00 GR	Merlene Ottey; Jamaica	11.03	Colleen Pekin; Australia	11.24
1986	Heather Oakes; England	11.20	Paula Dunn; England	11.21	Angella Issajenko; Canada	11.21
1990	Merlene Ottey; Jamaica	11.02 w	Kerry Johnson; Australia	11.17 w	Pauline Davis-Thompson; Bahamas	11.20w
1994	Mary Onyali; Nigeria	11.06	Christy Opara-Thompson; Nigeria	11.22	Paula Thomas; England	11.23
1998	Chandra Sturrup; Bahamas	11.06	Philomena Mensah; Canada	11.19	Tania Van Heer; Australia	11.29
2002	Debbie Ferguson; Bahamas	10.91 GR	Veronica Campbell; Jamaica	11.00	Savatheda Fynes; Bahamas	11.07
2006	Sheri-Ann Brooks; Jamaica	11.19	Geraldine Pillay; South Africa	11.31	Delphine Atangana; Cameroon	11.39
2010	Natasha Mayers; Saint Vincent and the Grenadines	11.37	Katherine Endacott; England	11.44	Delphine Atangana; Cameroon	11.48
2014	Blessing Okagbare; Nigeria	10.85 GR	Veronica Campbell-Brown; Jamaica	11.03	Kerron Stewart; Jamaica	11.07
2018	Michelle-Lee Ahye; Trinidad and Tobago	11.14	Christania Williams; Jamaica	11.21	Gayon Evans; Jamaica	11.22
2022	Elaine Thompson-Herah; Jamaica	10.95	Julien Alfred; Saint Lucia	11.01	Daryll Neita; England	11.07

=== 200 metres ===
Games	Gold		Silver		Bronze	
1970 (wind: 4.0 m/s)	Raelene Boyle; Australia	22.75 w	Alice Annum; Ghana	22.86 w	Margaret Critchley; England	23.16 w
1974	Raelene Boyle; Australia	22.50 GR	Denise Robertson; Australia	22.73	Alice Annum; Ghana	22.90
1978 (wind: 5.1 m/s)	Denise Boyd; Australia	22.82 w	Sonia Lannaman; England	22.89 w	Colleen Beazley; Australia	22.93 w
1982 (wind 2.5 m/s)	Merlene Ottey; Jamaica	22.19 w	Kathy Smallwood; England	22.21 w	Angella Taylor; Canada	22.48 w
1986	Angella Issajenko; Canada	22.91	Kathy Cook; England	23.18	Sandra Whittaker; Scotland	23.46
1990	Merlene Ottey; Jamaica	22.76	Kerry Johnson; Australia	22.88	Pauline Davis-Thompson; Bahamas	23.15
1994	Cathy Freeman; Australia	22.25 GR	Mary Onyali; Nigeria	22.35	Melinda Gainsford; Australia	22.68
1998	Nova Peris-Kneebone; Australia	22.77	Juliet Campbell; Jamaica	22.79	Lauren Hewitt; Australia	22.83
2002	Debbie Ferguson; Bahamas	22.20 GR	Juliet Campbell; Jamaica	22.54	Lauren Hewitt; Australia	22.69
2006	Sherone Simpson; Jamaica	22.59	Veronica Campbell; Jamaica	22.72	Geraldine Pillay; South Africa	22.92
2010	Cydonie Mothersille; Cayman Islands	22.89	Abi Oyepitan; England	23.26	Adrienne Power; Canada	23.52
2014	Blessing Okagbare; Nigeria	22.25	Jodie Williams; England	22.50	Bianca Williams; England	22.58
2018	Shaunae Miller-Uibo; Bahamas	22.09 GR	Shericka Jackson; Jamaica	22.18	Dina Asher-Smith; England	22.29
2022	Elaine Thompson-Herah; Jamaica	22.02 GR	Favour Ofili; Nigeria	22.51	Christine Mboma; Namibia	22.80

=== 400 metres ===
Games	Gold		Silver		Bronze	
1970	Marilyn Neufville; Jamaica	51.02 WR	Sandra Brown; Australia	53.66	Judith Ayaa; Uganda	53.77
1974	Yvonne Saunders; Canada	51.67	Verona Bernard; England	51.94	Charlene Rendina; Australia	52.08
1978	Donna Hartley; England	51.69	Verona Elder; England	52.94	Bethanie Nail; Australia	53.06
1982	Raelene Boyle; Australia	51.26	Michelle Scutt; Wales	51.97	Joslyn Hoyte-Smith; England	52.53
1986	Debbie Flintoff; Australia	51.29	Jillian Richardson; Canada	51.62	Kathy Cook; England	51.88
1990	Fatima Yusuf; Nigeria	51.08	Linda Keough; England	51.63	Charity Opara; Nigeria	52.01
1994	Cathy Freeman; Australia	50.38 GR	Fatima Yusuf; Nigeria	50.53	Sandie Richards; Jamaica	50.69
1998	Sandie Richards; Jamaica	50.17 GR	Allison Curbishley; Scotland	50.71	Donna Fraser; England	51.01
2002	Aliann Pompey; Guyana	51.63	Lee McConnell; Scotland	51.68	Sandie Richards; Jamaica	51.79
2006	Christine Ohuruogu; England	50.28	Tonique Williams-Darling; Bahamas	50.76	Novlene Williams; Jamaica	51.12
2010	Amantle Montsho; Botswana	50.10 GR	Aliann Pompey; Guyana	51.65	Christine Amertil; Bahamas	51.96
2014	Stephenie Ann McPherson; Jamaica	50.67	Novlene Williams-Mills; Jamaica	50.86	Christine Day; Jamaica	51.09
2018	Amantle Montsho; Botswana	50.15	Anastasia Le-Roy; Jamaica	50.57	Stephenie Ann McPherson; Jamaica	50.93
2022	Sada Williams; Barbados	49.90 GR	Victoria Ohuruogu; England	50.72	Jodie Williams; England	51.26

=== 800 metres ===
Games	Gold		Silver		Bronze	
1970	Rosemary Stirling; Scotland	2:06.24	Pat Lowe; England	2:06.27	Cheryl Peasley; Australia	2:06.33
1974	Charlene Rendina; Australia	2:01.11	Sue Haden; New Zealand	2:02.04	Sabina Chebichi; Kenya	2:02.61
1978	Judy Peckham; Australia	2:02.82	Tekla Chemabwai; Kenya	2:02.87	Jane Colebrook; England	2:03.10
1982	Kirsty McDermott; Wales	2:01.31	Anne Clarkson; Scotland	2:01:52	Heather Barralet; Australia	2:01:70
1986	Kirsty Wade; Wales	2:00.94	Diane Edwards; England	2:01.12	Lorraine Baker; England	2:01.79
1990	Diane Edwards; England	2:00.25 GR	Ann Williams; England	2:00.40	Sharon Stewart; Australia	2:00.87
1994	Inez Turner; Jamaica	2:01.74	Charmaine Crooks; Canada	2:02.35	Gladys Wamuyu; Kenya	2:03.12
1998	Maria Mutola; Mozambique	1:57.60	Tina Paulino; Mozambique	1:58.39	Diane Modahl; England	1:58.81
2002	Maria Mutola; Mozambique	1:57.35 GR	Diane Cummins; Canada	1:58.82	Agnes Samaria; Namibia	1:59.15
2006	Janeth Jepkosgei; Kenya	1:57.88	Kenia Sinclair; Jamaica	1:58.16	Maria Mutola; Mozambique	1:58.77
2010	Nancy Langat; Kenya	2:00.01	Nikki Hamblin; New Zealand	2:00.05	Diane Cummins; Canada	2:00.13
2014	Eunice Sum; Kenya	2:00.51	Lynsey Sharp; Scotland	2:01.34	Winnie Nanyondo; Uganda	2:01.38
2018	Caster Semenya; South Africa	1:56.68 GR	Margaret Wambui; Kenya	1:58.07	Natoya Goule; Jamaica	1:58.82
2022	Mary Moraa; Kenya	1:57.07	Keely Hodgkinson; England	1:57.40	Laura Muir; Scotland	1:57.87

=== 1500 metres ===
Games	Gold		Silver		Bronze	
1970	Rita Ridley; England	4:18.8	Joan Page; England	4:19.0	Thelma Fynn; Canada	4:19.1
1974	Glenda Reiser; Canada	4:07.08 GR	Joan Allison; England	4:10.66	Thelma Wright; Canada	4:12.26
1978	Mary Stewart; England	4:06.34 GR	Christine Benning; England	4:07.53	Penny Werthner; Canada	4:08.14
1982	Christina Boxer; England	4:08.28	Gillian Dainty; England	4:10.80	Lorraine Moller; New Zealand	4:12:67
1986	Kirsty Wade; Wales	4:10.91	Debbie Bowker; Canada	4:11.94	Lynn Williams; Canada	4:12.66
1990	Angela Chalmers; Canada	4:08.41	Christina Cahill; England	4:08.71	Bev Nicholson; England	4:09.00
1994	Kelly Holmes; England	4:08.86	Paula Schnurr; Canada	4:09.65	Gwen Griffiths; South Africa	4:10.16
1998	Jackline Maranga; Kenya	4:05.27 GR	Kelly Holmes; England	4:06.10	Julia Sakara; Zimbabwe	4:07.82
2002	Kelly Holmes; England	4:05.99	Hayley Tullett; Wales	4:07.52	Helen Pattinson; England	4:07.62
2006	Lisa Dobriskey; England	4:06.21	Sarah Jamieson; Australia	4:06.64	Hayley Tullett; Wales	4:06.76
2010	Nancy Langat; Kenya	4:05.26 GR	Nikki Hamblin; New Zealand	4:05.97	Stephanie Twell; Scotland	4:06.15
2014	Faith Kipyegon; Kenya	4:08.94	Laura Weightman; England	4:09.24	Kate Van Buskirk; Canada	4:09.41
2018	Caster Semenya; South Africa	4:00.71 GR	Beatrice Chepkoech; Kenya	4:03.09	Melissa Courtney; Wales	4:03.44
2022	Laura Muir; Scotland	4:02.75	Ciara Mageean; Northern Ireland	4:04.14	Abbey Caldwell; Australia	4:04.79

=== 5000 metres ===
Games	Gold		Silver		Bronze	
1998	Kate Anderson; Australia	15:52.74	Andrea Whitcombe; England	15:56.85	Samukeliso Moyo; Zimbabwe	15:57.57
2002	Paula Radcliffe; England	14.31.42 GR	Edith Masai; Kenya	14:53.76	Iness Chenonge; Kenya	15:06.06
2006	Isabella Ochichi; Kenya	14:57.84	Jo Pavey; England	14:59.08	Lucy Wangui Kabuu; Kenya	15:00.20
2010	Vivian Cheruiyot; Kenya	15:55.12	Sylvia Kibet; Kenya	15:55.61	Ines Chenonge; Kenya	16:02.47
2014	Mercy Cherono; Kenya	15:07.21	Janet Kisa; Kenya	15:08.90	Jo Pavey; England	15:08.96
2018	Hellen Obiri; Kenya	15:13.11	Margaret Chelimo Kipkemboi; Kenya	15:15.28	Laura Weightman; England	15:25.84
2022	Beatrice Chebet; Kenya	14:38.21	Eilish McColgan; Scotland	14:42.14	Selah Busieni; Kenya	14:48.24

=== 10,000 metres ===
Games	Gold		Silver		Bronze	
1986	Liz Lynch; Scotland	31:41.42	Anne Audain; New Zealand	31:53.31	Angela Tooby; Wales	32:25.38
1990	Liz McColgan; Scotland	32:23.56	Jill Hunter; England	32:33.21	Barbara Moore; New Zealand	32:44.73
1994	Yvonne Murray; Scotland	31:56.97	Elana Meyer; South Africa	32:06.02	Jane Omoro; Kenya	32:13.01
1998	Esther Wanjiru; Kenya	33:40.13	Kylie Risk; Australia	33:42.11	Clair Fearnley; Australia	33:52.13
2002	Salina Kosgei; Kenya	31:27.83 GR	Susan Chepkemei; Kenya	31:32.04	Susie Power; Australia	31:32.20
2006	Lucy Kabuu; Kenya	31:29.66	Evelyne Nganga; Kenya	31:30.86	Mara Yamauchi; England	31:49.40
2010	Grace Momanyi; Kenya	32:34.11	Doris Changeywo; Kenya	32:36.97	Kavita Raut; India	33:05.28
2014	Joyce Chepkirui; Kenya	32:09.35	Florence Kiplagat; Kenya	32:09.48	Emily Chebet; Kenya	32:10.82
2018	Stella Chesang; Uganda	31:45.30	Stacey Chepkemboi Ndiwa; Kenya	31:46.36	Mercyline Chelangat; Uganda	31:48.41
2022	Eilish McColgan; Scotland	30:48.60 GR	Irene Chepet Cheptai; Kenya	30:49.52	Sheila Chepkirui; Kenya	31:09.46

=== 100 metres hurdles ===
Games	Gold		Silver		Bronze	
1970	Pam Kilborn; Australia	13.27	Maureen Caird; Australia	13.73	Christine Bell; England	13.82
1974	Judy Vernon; England	13.45	Gaye Dell; Australia	13.54	Modupe Oshikoya; Nigeria	13.69
1978 (wind: 3.6 m/s)	Lorna Boothe; England	12.98 w	Shirley Strong; England	13.08 w	Sharon Colyear; England	13.17 w
1982	Shirley Strong; England	12.78	Lorna Boothe; England	12.90	Sue Kameli; Canada	13.10
1986	Sally Gunnell; England	13.29	Wendy Jeal; England	13.41	Glynis Nunn; Australia	13.44
1990	Kay Morley; Wales	12.91	Sally Gunnell; England	13.12	Lesley-Ann Skeete; England	13.31
1994	Michelle Freeman; Jamaica	13.12	Jacqui Agyepong; England	13.14	Sam Farquharson; England	13.38
1998	Gillian Russell; Jamaica	12.70 GR	Sriyani Kulawansa; Sri Lanka	12.95	Katie Anderson; Canada	13.04
2002	Lacena Golding-Clarke; Jamaica	12.77	Vonette Dixon; Jamaica	12.83	Angela Atede; Nigeria	12.98
2006	Brigitte Foster-Hylton; Jamaica	12.75	Angela Whyte; Canada	12.94	Delloreen Ennis-London; Jamaica	13.00
2010	Sally Pearson; Australia	12.67	Angela Whyte; Canada	12.98	Andrea Miller; New Zealand	13.25
2014	Sally Pearson; Australia	12.67	Tiffany Porter; England	12.80	Angela Whyte; Canada	13.02
2018	Oluwatobiloba Amusan; Nigeria	12.68	Danielle Williams; Jamaica	12.78	Yanique Thompson; Jamaica	12.97
2022	Tobi Amusan; Nigeria	12.30 GR	Devynne Charlton; Bahamas	12.58	Cindy Sember; England	12.59

=== 400 metres hurdles ===
Games	Gold		Silver		Bronze	
1982	Debbie Flintoff; Australia	55.89	Ruth Kyalisima; Uganda	57.10	Yvette Wray; England	57.17
1986	Debbie Flintoff; Australia	54.94	Donalda Duprey; Canada	56.55	Jenny Laurendet; Australia	56.57
1990	Sally Gunnell; England	55.38	Debbie Flintoff-King; Australia	56.00	Jenny Laurendet; Australia	56.74
1994	Sally Gunnell; England	54.51	Deon Hemmings; Jamaica	55.11	Debbie-Ann Parris; Jamaica	55.25
1998	Andrea Blackett; Barbados	53.91	Gowry Retchakan-Hodge; England	55.25	Karlene Haughton; Canada	55.53
2002	Jana Pittman; Australia	54.40	Debbie-Ann Parris; Jamaica	55.24	Karlene Haughton; Canada	56.13
2006	Jana Pittman; Australia	53.82 GR	Tasha Danvers Smith; England	55.17	Lee McConnell; Scotland	55.25
2010	Muizat Ajoke Odumosu; Nigeria	55.28	Eilidh Child; Scotland	55.62	Nickiesha Wilson; Jamaica	56.06
2014	Kaliese Spencer; Jamaica	54.10	Eilidh Child; Scotland	55.02	Janieve Russell; Jamaica	55.64
2018	Janieve Russell; Jamaica	54.33	Eilidh Doyle; Scotland	54.80	Wenda Nel; South Africa	54.96
2022	Janieve Russell; Jamaica	54.14	Shiann Salmon; Jamaica	54.47	Zeney van der Walt; South Africa	54.47

=== 3000 metres steeplechase ===
Games	Gold		Silver		Bronze	
2006	Dorcus Inzikuru; Uganda	9:19.51 GR	Melissa Rollison; Australia	9:24.29	Donna MacFarlane; Australia	9:25.05
2010	Milcah Chemos Cheywa; Kenya	9:40.96	Mercy Wanjiru Njoroge; Kenya	9:41.54	Gladys Jerotich Kipkemoi; Kenya	9:52.51
2014	Purity Kirui; Kenya	9:30.96	Milcah Cheywa; Kenya	9:31.30	Joan Kipkemoi; Kenya	9:33.34
2018	Aisha Praught-Leer; Jamaica	9:21.00	Celliphine Chespol; Kenya	9:22.61	Purity Cherotich Kirui; Kenya	9:25.74
2022	Jackline Chepkoech; Kenya	9:15.68 GR	Elizabeth Bird; England	9:17.79	Peruth Chemutai; Uganda	9:23.24

=== 4 × 100 metres relay ===
Games	Gold		Silver		Bronze	
1970	Australia; Pam Ryan; Jenny Lamy; Marion Hoffman; Raelene Boyle	44.14	England; Anita Neil; Margaret Critchley; Madeleine Cobb; Val Peat	44.28	Canada; Joan Hendry; Joyce Sadowick; Patty Loverock; Stephanie Berto	44.68
1974	Australia; Denise Robertson; Jenny Lamy; Raelene Boyle; Robyn Boak	43.51 GR	England; Barbara Martin; Andrea Lynch; Judy Vernon; Sonia Lannaman	44.30	Ghana; Alice Annum; Hannah Afriyie; Josephine Ocran; Rose Asiedua	44.35
1978	England; Beverley Goddard; Kathy Smallwood; Sharon Colyear; Sonia Lannaman	43.70	Canada; Angela Bailey; Margaret Howe; Marjorie Bailey; Patty Loverock	44.26	Australia; Colleen Beazley; Denise Boyd; Lyn Jacenko; Roxanne Gelle	44.78
1982	England; Wendy Hoyte; Kathy Smallwood; Beverley Goddard; Sonia Lannaman	43.15 GR	Canada; Angela Bailey; Marita Payne; Angella Taylor; Molly Killingbeck	43.66	Jamaica; Cathy Rattray-Williams; Grace Jackson; Leleith Hodges; Merlene Ottey	43.69
1986	England; Paula Dunn; Kathy Cook; Joan Baptiste; Heather Oakes	43.39	Canada; Angela Bailey; Esmie Lawrence; Angela Phipps; Angella Issajenko	43.83	Wales; Helen Miles; Sian Morris; Sallyanne Short; Carmen Smart	45.37
1990	Australia; Monique Dunstan; Kathy Sambell; Cathy Freeman; Kerry Johnson	43.87	England; Stephi Douglas; Jennifer Stoute; Simmone Jacobs; Paula Dunn	44.15	Nigeria; Beatrice Utondu; Fatima Yusuf; Charity Opara; Chioma Ajunwa	44.67
1994	Nigeria; Faith Idehen; Mary Tombiri; Christy Opara-Thompson; Mary Onyali	42.99	Australia; Monique Miers; Cathy Freeman; Melinda Gainsford; Kathy Sambell	43.43	England; Stephi Douglas; Geraldine McLeod; Simmone Jacobs; Paula Thomas	43.46
1998	Australia; Tania Van Heer; Lauren Hewitt; Nova Peris-Kneebone; Sharon Cripps	43.39	Jamaica; Donnette Brown; Juliet Campbell; Gillian Russell; Brigitte Foster	43.49	England; Marcia Richardson; Donna Fraser; Simmone Jacobs; Joice Maduaka	43.69
2002	Bahamas; Tamicka Clarke; Savatheda Fynes; Chandra Sturrup; Debbie Ferguson	42.44 GR	Jamaica; Elva Goulbourne; Juliet Campbell; Astia Walker; Veronica Campbell	42.73	England; Joice Maduaka; Shani Anderson; Vernicha James; Abi Oyepitan	42.84
2006	Jamaica; Danielle Browning; Sheri-Ann Brooks; Peta-Gaye Dowdie; Sherone Simpson	43.10	England; Anyika Onuora; Kimberly Wall; Laura Turner; Emma Ania	43.43	Australia; Sally McLellan; Melanie Kleeberg; Lauren Hewitt; Crystal Attenborough	44.25
2010	England; Katherine Endacott; Montell Douglas; Laura Turner; Abi Oyepitan	44.19	Ghana; Rosina Amenebede; Elizabeth Amolofo; Beatrice Gyaman; Janet Amponsah	45.24	India; Geetha Saati; Srabani Nanda; P. K. Priya; H. M. Jyothi	45.25
2014	Jamaica; Kerron Stewart; Veronica Campbell-Brown; Schillonie Calvert; Shelly-Ann Fraser-Pryce; Elaine Thompson^{†}	41.83 GR	Nigeria; Gloria Asumnu; Blessing Okagbare; Dominique Duncan; Lawretta Ozoh; Patience Okon George^{†}	42.92	England; Asha Philip; Bianca Williams; Jodie Williams; Ashleigh Nelson; Anyika Onuora^{†} Louise Bloor^{†}	43.10
2018	England; Asha Philip; Dina Asher-Smith; Bianca Williams; Lorraine Ugen	42.46	Jamaica; Gayon Evans; Elaine Thompson; Natasha Morrison; Christania Williams	42.52	Nigeria; Oluwatobiloba Amusan; Rosemary Chukwuma; Blessing Okagbare-Ighoteguonor; Joy Udo-Gabriel	42.75
2022	England; Asha Philip; Imani-Lara Lansiquot; Bianca Williams; Daryll Neita	42.41	Jamaica; Kemba Nelson; Natalliah Whyte; Remona Burchell; Elaine Thompson-Herah	43.08	Australia; Ella Connolly; Bree Masters; Jacinta Beecher; Naa Anang	43.16

=== 4 × 400 metres relay ===
Games	Gold		Silver		Bronze	
1974	England; Jannette Roscoe; Ruth Kennedy; Sue Pettett; Verona Elder	3:29.23	Australia; Charlene Rendina; Judy Peckham; Margaret Ramsay; Terri Cater	3:30.72	Canada; Brenda Walsh; Margaret McGowen; Maureen Crowley; Yvonne Saunders	3:33.92
1978	England; Donna Hartley; Joslyn Hoyte-Smith; Ruth Kennedy; Verona Elder	3:27.19 GR	Australia; Bethanie Nail; Denise Boyd; Judy Peckham; Maxine Corcoran	3:28.65	Canada; Anne Mackie-Morelli; Debbie Campbell; Margaret Stride; Rachelle Campbell	3:35.83
1982	Canada; Charmaine Crooks; Jillian Richardson; Molly Killingbeck; Angella Taylor	3:27.70	Australia; Leanne Evans; Denise Boyd; Debbie Flintoff-King; Raelene Boyle	3:27.72	Scotland; Sandra Whittaker; Angela Bridgeman; Anne Clarkson; Linsey MacDonald	3:32.92
1986	Canada; Charmaine Crooks; Marita Payne; Molly Killingbeck; Jillian Richardson	3:28.92	England; Jane Parry; Linda Keough; Angela Piggford; Kathy Cook	3:32.82	Australia; Maree Chapman; Sharon Stewart; Julie Schwass; Debbie Flintoff	3:32.86
1990	England; Angela Piggford; Jennifer Stoute; Sally Gunnell; Linda Keough	3:28.08	Australia; Maree Holland; Sharon Stewart; Susan Andrews; Debbie Flintoff-King	3:30.74	Canada; Rosey Edeh; France Gareau; Cheryl Allen; Gail Harris	3:33.26
1994	England; Phylis Smith; Tracy Goddard; Linda Keough; Sally Gunnell	3:27.06 GR	Jamaica; Revoli Campbell; Deon Hemmings; Inez Turner; Sandie Richards	3:28.63	Canada; Alanna Yakiwchuck; Stacey Bowen; Donalda Duprey; Charmaine Crooks	3:33.52
1998	Australia; Susan Andrews; Tamsyn Lewis; Lee Naylor; Tania Van Heer	3:27.28	England; Michelle Thomas; Michelle Pierre; Victoria Day; Donna Fraser	3:29.28	Canada; Karlene Haughton; Diane Cummins; LaDonna Antoine; Foy Williams	3:29.97
2002	Australia; Lauren Hewitt; Cathy Freeman; Tamsyn Lewis; Jana Pittman	3:25.63 GR	England; Helen Frost; Helen Karagounis; Melanie Purkiss; Lisa Miller; Jenny Meadows*	3:26.73	Nigeria; Olabisi Afolabi; Kudirat Akhigbe; Hajarat Yusuf; Doris Jacob	3:29.16
2006	Australia; Jana Pittman; Caitlin Willis; Tamsyn Lewis; Rosemary Hayward	3:28.66	India; Rajwinder Kaur; Chitra Soman; Manjeet Kaur; Pinki Pramanik	3:29.57	Nigeria; Kudirat Akhigbe; Joy Eze; Folashade Abugan; Christy Ekpukhon	3:31.83
2010	India; Manjeet Kaur; Sini Jose; Ashwini Akkunji; Mandeep Kaur; Jauna Murmu*; Chitra Soman*	3:27.77	England; Kelly Massey; Vicki Barr; Meghan Beesley; Nadine Okyere; Joice Maduaka*	3:29.51	Canada; Amonn Nelson; Adrienne Power; Vicki Tolton; Carline Muir; Ruky Abdulai*,	3:30.20
2014	Jamaica; Christine Day; Novlene Williams-Mills; Anastasia Le-Roy; Stephenie Ann McPherson; Janieve Russell^{†} Shericka Williams^{†}	3:23.82 GR	Nigeria; Patience Okon George; Regina George; Ada Benjamin; Folashade Abugan; Funke Oladoye^{†} Omolara Omotosho^{†}	3:24.71	England; Christine Ohuruogu; Shana Cox; Kelly Massey; Anyika Onuora; Emily Diamond^{†} Margaret Adeoye^{†}	3:27.24
2018	Jamaica; Christine Day; Anastasia Le-Roy; Janieve Russell; Stephenie Ann McPherson	3:24.00	Nigeria; Patience Okon George; Glory Onome Nathaniel; Praise Idamadudu; Yinka Ajayi	3:25.29	Botswana; Galefele Moroko; Christine Botlogetswe; Loungo Matlhaku; Amantle Montsho	3:26.86
2022	Canada; Natassha McDonald; Aiyanna Stiverne; Micha Powell; Kyra Constantine	3:25.84	Jamaica; Shiann Salmon; Junelle Bromfield; Roneisha McGregor; Natoya Goule	3:26.93	Scotland; Zoey Clark; Beth Dobbin; Jill Cherry; Nicole Yeargin	3:30.15

=== Marathon ===
Games	Gold		Silver		Bronze	
1986	Lisa Martin; Australia	2:26:07	Lorraine Moller; New Zealand	2:28:17	Odette Lapierre; Canada	2:31:48
1990	Lisa Martin; Australia	2:25:28	Tani Ruckle; Australia	2:33:15	Angie Pain; England	2:36:35
1994	Carole Rouillard; Canada	2:30:41	Lizanne Bussières; Canada	2:31:07	Yvonne Danson; England	2:32:24
1998	Heather Turland; Australia	2:41.24	Lisa Dick; Australia	2:41.48	Elizabeth Mongudhi; Namibia	2:43.28
2002	Kerryn McCann; Australia	2:30.05 GR	Krishna Stanton; Australia	2:34.52	Jackie Gallagher; Australia	2:36.37
2006	Kerryn McCann; Australia	2:30:54	Hellen Cherono Koskei; Kenya	2:30:56	Liz Yelling; England	2:32:19
2010	Irene Jerotich; Kenya	2:34:32	Irene Mogaka; Kenya	2:34:43	Lisa Jane Weightman; Australia	2:35:25
2014	Philomena Cheyech Daniel; Kenya	2:26:45	Caroline Kilel; Kenya	2:27:10	Jessica Trengove; Australia	2:30:12
2018	Helalia Johannes; Namibia	2:32:40	Lisa Jane Weightman; Australia	2:33:23	Jessica Trengove; Australia	2:34:09
2022	Jessica Stenson; Australia	2:27:31	Margaret Wangari Muriuki; Kenya	2:28:00	Helalia Johannes; Namibia	2:28:39

=== 10 km walk ===
Games	Gold		Silver		Bronze	
1990	Kerry Saxby; Australia	45:03	Anne Judkins; New Zealand	47:03	Lisa Langford; England	47:23
1994	Kerry Saxby-Junna; Australia	44:25	Anne Manning; Australia	44:37	Janice McCaffrey; Canada	44:54
1998	Jane Saville; Australia	43:57 GR	Kerry Saxby-Junna; Australia	44:27	Lisa Kehler; England	45:03
2022	Jemima Montag; Australia	42:34.30 GR	Priyanka Goswami; India	43:38.83	Emily Wamusyi Ngii; Kenya	43:50.86

=== High jump ===
Games	Gold		Silver		Bronze	
1934	Marjorie Clark (SAF)	1.60	Eva Dawes (CAN)	1.57	Margaret Bell (CAN)	1.52
1938	Dorothy Odam; England	1.60	Dora Gardner; England	1.57	Betty Forbes; New Zealand	1.57
1950	Dorothy Odam; England	1.60 GR=	Bertha Crowther; England	1.60 m	Noelene Swinton; New Zealand	1.55 m
1954	Thelma Hopkins; Northern Ireland	1.67 m GR	Dorothy Tyler; England	1.60 m	Alice Whitty (CAN)	1.60 m
1958	Michele Mason; Australia	1.70 m	Mary Donaghy; New Zealand	1.70 m	Helen Frith; Australia	1.65 m
1962	Robyn Woodhouse; Australia	5 ft 10 in (1.78 m) GR	Helen Frith; Australia	5 ft 8 in (1.73 m)	Michele Mason; Australia	5 ft 8 in (1.73 m)
1966	Michele Brown; Australia	1.73 m	Dorothy Shirley; England	1.70 m	Robyn Woodhouse; Australia	1.70 m
1970	Debbie Brill; Canada	1.78 m	Ann Wilson; England	1.70 m	Moira Walls; Scotland	1.70 m
1974	Barbara Lawton; England	1.84	Louise Hanna; Canada	1.82	Brigitte Bittner; Canada	1.80
1978	Katrina Gibbs; Australia	1.93 m GR	Debbie Brill; Canada	1.90 m	Julie White; Canada	1.83 m
1982	Debbie Brill; Canada	1.88 m	Christine Stanton; Australia	1.88 m	Barbara Simmonds; England	1.83 m
1986	Christine Stanton; Australia	1.92 m	Sharon McPeake; Northern Ireland	1.90 m	Janet Boyle; Northern Ireland	1.90 m
1990	Tania Murray; New Zealand	1.88 m	Janet Boyle; Northern Ireland	1.88 m	Tracy Phillips; New Zealand	1.88 m
1994	Alison Inverarity; Australia	1.94 m	Charmaine Weavers; South Africa	1.94 m	Debbie Marti; England	1.91 m
1998	Hestrie Storbeck; South Africa	1.91 m	Joanne Jennings; England	1.91 m	Alison Inverarity; Australia	1.88 m
2002	Hestrie Cloete; South Africa	1.96 m GR	Susan Jones; England	1.90 m	Nicole Forrester; Canada	1.87 m
2006	Anika Smit; South Africa	1.91 m	Julie Crane; Wales	1.88 m	Karen Beautle; Jamaica; Angela McKee; New Zealand	1.83 m
2010	Nicole Forrester; Canada	1.91 m	Sheree Francis; Jamaica	1.88 m	Levern Spencer; Saint Lucia	1.88 m
2014	Eleanor Patterson; Australia	1.94 m	Isobel Pooley; England	1.92 m	Levern Spencer; Saint Lucia	1.92 m
2018	Levern Spencer; Saint Lucia	1.95 m	Morgan Lake; England	1.93 m	Nicola McDermott; Australia	1.91 m
2022	Lamara Distin; Jamaica	1.95 m	Eleanor Patterson; Australia	1.92 m	Kimberly Williamson; Jamaica	1.92 m

=== Pole vault ===
Games	Gold		Silver		Bronze	
1998	Emma George; Australia	4.20 m	Elmarie Gerryts; South Africa	4.15 m	Trista Bernier; Canada	4.15 m
2002	Tatiana Grigorieva; Australia	4.35 m	Kym Howe; Australia	4.15 m	Irie Hill; England; Bridgid Isworth; Australia; Stephanie McCann; Canada	4.10 m
2006	Kym Howe; Australia	4.62 m GR	Tatiana Grigorieva; Australia	4.35 m	Stephanie McCann; Canada	4.25 m
2010	Alana Boyd; Australia	4.40 m	Marianna Zachariadi; Cyprus	4.40 m	Kate Dennison; England; Carly Dockendorf; Canada; Kelsie Hendry; Canada	4.25 m
2014	Alana Boyd; Australia	4.50 m	Sally Peake; Wales	4.25 m	Alysha Newman; Canada; Sally Scott; England	3.80 m
2018	Alysha Newman; Canada	4.75 m GR	Eliza McCartney; New Zealand	4.70 m	Nina Kennedy; Australia	4.60 m
2022	Nina Kennedy; Australia	4.60 m	Molly Caudery; England	4.45 m	Imogen Ayris; New Zealand	4.45 m

=== Long jump ===
Games	Gold		Silver		Bronze	
1934	Phyllis Bartholomew; England	5.47	Evelyn Goshawk (CAN)	5.41	Violet Webb; England	5.23
1938	Decima Norman; Australia	5.80	Ethel Raby; England	5.65	Thelma Peake; Australia	5.55
1950	Yvette Williams; New Zealand	5.90 m GR	Judy Canty; Australia	5.78 m	Ruth Dowman; New Zealand	5.74 m
1954	Yvette Williams; New Zealand	6.08 m GR	Thelma Hopkins; Northern Ireland	5.84 m	Jean Desforges; England	5.84 m
1958	Sheila Hoskin; England	6.02 m (w)	Mary Bignal; England	5.97 m (w)	Bev Watson; Australia	5.97 m (w)
1962	Pam Kilborn; Australia	20 ft 6 3/4 in (6.27 m)	Helen Frith; Australia	20 ft 5 3/4 in (6.24 m)	Janet Knee; Australia	20 ft 1 1/4 in (6.13 m)
1966	Mary Rand; England	6.36 m	Sheila Parkin; England	6.30 m	Violet Odogwu; Nigeria	6.15 m
1970	Sheila Sherwood; England	6.73 m	Ann Wilson; England	6.50 m	Joan Hendry; Canada	6.28 m
1974	Modupe Oshikoya; Nigeria	6.46	Brenda Eisler; Canada	6.38	Ruth Martin-Jones; Wales	6.38
1978	Sue Reeve; England	6.59 m	Erica Hooker; Australia	6.58 m	June Griffith; Guyana	6.52 m
1982	Shonel Ferguson; Bahamas	6.91 m	Robyn Strong; Australia	6.88 m	Beverly Kinch; England	6.78 m
1986	Joyce Oladapo; England	6.43 m	Mary Berkeley; England	6.40 m	Robyn Lorraway; Australia	6.35 m
1990	Jane Flemming; Australia	6.78 m	Beatrice Utondu; Nigeria	6.65 m (w)	Fiona May; England	6.55 m
1994	Nicole Boegman; Australia	6.82 m	Oluyinka Idowu; England	6.73 m	Christy Opara-Thompson; Nigeria	6.72 m
1998	Joanne Wise; England	6.63 m	Jackie Edwards; Bahamas	6.59 m	Nicole Boegman; Australia	6.58 m
2002	Elva Goulbourne; Jamaica	6.70 m	Jade Johnson; England	6.58 m	Anju Bobby George; India	6.49 m
2006	Bronwyn Thompson; Australia	6.97 m GR	Kerrie Taurima; Australia	6.57 m	Céline Laporte; Seychelles	6.57 m
2010	Alice Falaiye; Canada	6.50 m	Prajusha Maliakkal; India	6.47 m	Tabia Charles; Canada	6.44 m
2014	Ese Brume; Nigeria	6.56 m	Jazmin Sawyers; England	6.54 m	Christabel Nettey; Canada	6.49 m
2018	Christabel Nettey; Canada	6.84 m	Brooke Stratton; Australia	6.77 m	Shara Proctor; England	6.75 m
2022	Ese Brume; Nigeria	7.00 m GR	Brooke Buschkuehl; Australia	6.95 m	Deborah Acquah; Ghana	6.94 m

=== Triple jump ===
Games	Gold		Silver		Bronze	
1998	Ashia Hansen; England	14.32 m	Françoise Mbango; Cameroon	13.95 m	Connie Henry; England	13.94 m
2002	Ashia Hansen; England	14.86 m GR	Françoise Mbango; Cameroon	14.82 m	Trecia Smith; Jamaica	14.32 m
2006	Trecia Smith; Jamaica	14.39 m	Otonye Iworima; Nigeria	13.53 m	Nadia Williams; England	13.42 m
2010	Trecia-Kaye Smith; Jamaica	14.19 m	Ayanna Alexander; Trinidad and Tobago	13.91 m	Tabia Charles; Canada	13.84 m
2014	Kimberly Williams; Jamaica	14.21 m	Laura Samuel; England	14.09 m	Ayanna Alexander; Trinidad and Tobago	14.01 m
2018	Kimberly Williams; Jamaica	14.64 m	Shanieka Ricketts; Jamaica	14.52 m	Thea LaFond; Dominica	13.92 m
2022	Shanieka Ricketts; Jamaica	14.94 m GR	Thea LaFond; Dominica	14.39 m	Naomi Metzger; England	14.37 m

=== Shot put ===
Games	Gold		Silver		Bronze	
1954	Yvette Williams; New Zealand	13.96 m GR	Jackie MacDonald (CAN)	12.98 m	Magdalena Swanepoel (SAF)	12.81 m
1958	Val Sloper; New Zealand	15.54 m	Suzanne Allday; England	14.44 m	Jackie Gelling (CAN)	14.03 m
1962	Valerie Young; New Zealand	49 ft 11 1/2 in (15.23 m)	Jean Roberts; Australia	47 ft 7 1/2 in (14.52 m)	Suzanne Allday; England	44 ft 6 in (13.56 m)
1966	Val Young; New Zealand	16.50 m	Mary Peters; Northern Ireland	16.29 m	Nancy McCredie; Canada	15.34 m
1970	Mary Peters; Northern Ireland	15.93 m	Barbara Poulsen; New Zealand	15.87 m	Jean Roberts; Australia	15.32 m
1974	Jane Haist; Canada	16.12	Valerie Young; New Zealand	15.29	Jean Roberts; Australia	15.24
1978	Gael Mulhall; Australia	17.31 m	Carmen Ionesco; Canada	16.45 m	Judy Oakes; England	16.14 m
1982	Judy Oakes; England	17.92 m	Gael Mulhall; Australia	17.68 m	Rose Hauch; Canada	16.71 m
1986	Gael Martin; Australia	19.00 m	Judy Oakes; England	18.75 m	Myrtle Augee; England	17.52 m
1990	Myrtle Augee; England	18.48 m	Judy Oakes; England	18.43 m	Yvonne Hanson-Nortey; England	16.00 m
1994	Judy Oakes; England	18.16 m	Myrtle Augee; England	17.64 m	Lisa-Marie Vizaniari; Australia	16.61 m
1998	Judy Oakes; England	18.83 m	Myrtle Augee; England	17.16 m	Veronica Abrahamse; South Africa	16.52 m
2002	Vivian Chukwuemeka; Nigeria	17.53 m	Valerie Adams; New Zealand	17.45 m	Veronica Abrahamse; South Africa	16.77 m
2006	Valerie Vili; New Zealand	19.66 m GR	Vivian Chukwuemeka; Nigeria	18.75 m	Cleopatra Borel-Brown; Trinidad and Tobago	17.54 m
2010	Valerie Adams; New Zealand	20.47 m GR	Cleopatra Borel-Brown; Trinidad and Tobago	19.03 m	Margaret Satupai; Samoa	16.43 m
2014	Valerie Adams; New Zealand	19.88 m	Cleopatra Borel; Trinidad and Tobago	18.57 m	Julie Labonté; Canada	17.58 m
2018	Danniel Thomas-Dodd; Jamaica	19.36 m	Valerie Adams; New Zealand	18.70 m	Brittany Crew; Canada	18.32 m
2022	Sarah Mitton; Canada	19.03 m	Danniel Thomas-Dodd; Jamaica	18.98 m	Maddison-Lee Wesche; New Zealand	18.84 m

=== Discus throw ===
Games	Gold		Silver		Bronze	
1954	Yvette Williams; New Zealand	45.01 m GR	Suzanne Allday; England	40.02 m	Marie Dupree (CAN)	38.66 m
1958	Suzanne Allday; England	45.91 m	Jennifer Thompson; New Zealand	45.29 m	Val Sloper; New Zealand	44.93 m
1962	Valerie Young; New Zealand	164 ft 8 1/2 in (50.20 m)	Rosslyn Williams; Australia	153 ft 1 in (46.66 m)	Mary McDonald; Australia	151 ft 8 in (46.23 m)
1966	Val Young; New Zealand	49.78 m	Jean Roberts; Australia	49.20 m	Carol Martin; Canada	48.70 m
1970	Rosemary Payne; Scotland	54.46 m	Jean Roberts; Australia	51.02 m	Carol Martin; Canada	48.42 m
1974	Jane Haist; Canada	55.52	Rosemary Payne; Scotland	53.94	Carol Martin; Canada	53.16
1978	Carmen Ionesco; Canada	62.16 m	Gael Mulhall; Australia	57.60 m	Lucette Moreau; Canada	56.64 m
1982	Meg Ritchie; Scotland	62.98 m	Gael Mulhall; Australia	58.64 m	Lynda Whiteley; England	54.78 m
1986	Gael Martin; Australia	56.42 m	Venissa Head; Wales	56.20 m	Karen Pugh; England	54.72 m
1990	Lisa-Marie Vizaniari; Australia	56.38 m	Jackie McKernan; Northern Ireland	54.86 m	Astra Vitols; Australia	53.84 m
1994	Daniela Costian; Australia	63.72 m	Beatrice Faumuina; New Zealand	57.12 m	Lizette Etsebeth; South Africa	55.74 m
1998	Beatrice Faumuina; New Zealand	65.92 m GR	Lisa-Marie Vizaniari; Australia	62.14 m	Alison Lever; Australia	59.80 m
2002	Beatrice Faumuina; New Zealand	60.82 m	Neelam Jaswant Singh; India	58.49 m	Shelley Newman; England	58.13 m
2006	Elizna Naudé; South Africa	61.55 m	Seema Antil; India	60.56 m	Dani Samuels; Australia	59.44 m
2010	Krishna Poonia; India	61.51 m	Harwant Kaur; India	60.16 m	Seema Antil; India	58.46 m
2014	Dani Samuels; Australia	64.88 m	Seema Antil Punia; India	61.61 m	Jade Lally; England	60.48 m
2018	Dani Stevens; Australia	68.26 m GR	Seema Punia; India	60.41 m	Navjeet Dhillon; India	57.43 m
2022	Chioma Onyekwere; Nigeria	61.70 m	Jade Lally; England	58.42 m	Obiageri Amaechi; Nigeria	56.99 m

=== Hammer throw ===
Games	Gold		Silver		Bronze	
1998	Deborah Sosimenko; Australia	66.56 m	Lorraine Shaw; England	62.66 m	Caroline Wittrin; Canada	61.67
2002	Lorraine Shaw; England	66.83 m	Bronwyn Eagles; Australia	65.24 m	Karyne Di Marco; Australia	63.40 m
2006	Brooke Krueger; Australia	67.90 m GR	Jennifer Joyce; Canada	67.29 m	Lorraine Shaw; England	66.00 m
2010	Sultana Frizell; Canada	68.57 m GR	Carys Parry; Wales	64.93 m	Zoe Derham; England	64.04 m
2014	Sultana Frizell; Canada	71.97 m GR	Julia Ratcliffe; New Zealand	69.96 m	Sophie Hitchon; England	68.72 m
2018	Julia Ratcliffe; New Zealand	69.94 m	Alexandra Hulley; Australia	68.20 m	Lara Nielsen; Australia	65.03 m
2022	Camryn Rogers; Canada	74.08 m	Julia Ratcliffe; New Zealand	69.63 m	Jillian Weir; Canada	67.35 m

=== Javelin throw ===
Games	Gold		Silver		Bronze	
1934	Gladys Lunn; England	32.19	Edith Halstead; England	30.94	Margaret Cox; England	30.08
1938	Robina Higgins (CAN)	38.28	Antonia Robertson (SAF)	36.98	Gladys Lunn; England	36.41
1950	Charlotte MacGibbon; Australia	38.84 GR	Yvette Williams; New Zealand	37.96	Cleone Rivett-Carnac; New Zealand	34.43
1954	Magdalena Swanepoel (SAF)	43.83 m GR	Pearl Fisher; Northern Rhodesia	41.97 m	Shirley Couzens (CAN)	38.98 m
1958	Anna Pazera; Australia	57.40 m WR	Magdalena Swanepoel (SAF)	48.73 m	Averil Williams; England	46.78 m
1962	Sue Platt; England	164 ft 10 1/2 in (50.25 m)	Rosemary Morgan; England	162 ft 9 1/2 in (49.62 m)	Anna Pazera; Australia	159 ft 8 1/2 in (48.68 m)
1966	Margaret Parker; Australia	51.38 m	Anna Bocson; Australia	47.80 m	Jay Dahlgren; Canada	47.68 m
1970	Petra Rivers; Australia	52.00 m	Anne Farquhar; England	50.82 m	Jay Dahlgren; Canada	49.54 m
1974	Petra Rivers; Australia	55.48	Jenny Symon; Australia	52.14	Sharon Corbett; England	50.26
1978	Tessa Sanderson; England	61.34 m	Alison Hayward; Canada	54.52 m	Laurie Kern; Canada	53.60 m
1982	Sue Howland; Australia	64.46 m	Petra Rivers; Australia	62.28 m	Fatima Whitbread; England	58.86 m
1986	Tessa Sanderson; England	69.80 m GR	Fatima Whitbread; England	68.54 m	Sue Howland; Australia	64.74 m
1990	Tessa Sanderson; England	65.72 m	Sue Howland; Australia	61.18 m	Kate Farrow; Australia	58.98 m
1994	Louise McPaul; Australia	63.76 m	Kirsten Hellier; New Zealand	60.40 m	Sharon Gibson; England	58.20 m
1998	Louise McPaul; Australia	66.96 m	Karen Martin; England	57.82 m	Kirsty Morrison; England	56.34 m
2002	Laverne Eve; Bahamas	58.46 m	Cecilia McIntosh; Australia	57.42 m	Kelly Morgan; England	57.09 m
2006	Sunette Viljoen; South Africa	60.72 m	Laverne Eve; Bahamas	60.54 m	Olivia McKoy; Jamaica	58.27 m
2010	Sunette Viljoen; South Africa	62.34 m GR	Kim Mickle; Australia	60.90 m	Justine Robbeson; South Africa	60.03 m
2014	Kim Mickle; Australia	65.96 m GR	Sunette Viljoen; South Africa	63.19 m	Kelsey-Lee Roberts; Australia	62.95 m
2018	Kathryn Mitchell; Australia	68.92 m GR	Kelsey-Lee Roberts; Australia	63.89 m	Sunette Viljoen; South Africa	62.08 m
2022	Kelsey-Lee Barber; Australia	64.34 m	Mackenzie Little; Australia	64.27 m	Annu Rani; India	60.00 m

=== Heptathlon ===
Games	Gold		Silver		Bronze	
1982	Glynis Nunn; Australia	6282 pts	Judy Livermore; England	6214 pts	Jill Ross-Giffen; Canada	5981 pts
1986	Judy Simpson; England	6282 pts	Jane Flemming; Australia	6278 pts	Kim Hagger; England	5823 pts
1990	Jane Flemming; Australia	6695 pts GR	Sharon Jaklofsky-Smith; Australia	6115 pts	Judy Simpson; England	6085 pts
1994	Denise Lewis; England	6325 pts	Jane Flemming; Australia	6317 pts	Catherine Bond-Mills; Canada	6193 pts
1998	Denise Lewis; England	6513 pts	Jane Jamieson; Australia	6354 pts	Joanne Henry; New Zealand	6096 pts
2002	Jane Jamieson; Australia	6059 pts	Kylie Wheeler; Australia	5962 pts	Margaret Simpson; Ghana	5906 pts
2006	Kelly Sotherton; England	6396 pts	Kylie Wheeler; Australia	6298 pts	Jessica Ennis; England	6269 pts
2010	Louise Hazel; England	6156 pts	Jessica Zelinka; Canada	6100 pts	Grace Clements; England	5819 pts
2014	Brianne Theisen-Eaton; Canada	6597 pts	Jessica Zelinka; Canada	6270 pts	Jessica Taylor; England	5826 pts
2018	Katarina Johnson-Thompson; England	6255 pts	Nina Schultz; Canada	6133 pts	Niamh Emerson; England	6043 pts
2022	Katarina Johnson-Thompson; England	6377 pts	Kate O'Connor; Northern Ireland	6233 pts	Jade O'Dowda; England	6212 pts

== Disability events ==
=== 100 metres T12 ===
Games	Gold		Silver		Bronze	
2014	Libby Clegg; Scotland	12.20	Maria Muchavo; Mozambique	13.33	Lahja Ishitile; Namibia	13.48

=== 100 metres T37 ===
Games	Gold		Silver		Bronze	
2006	Elizabeth McIntosh; Australia	14.38	Katrina Webb; Australia	14.51	Beverley Jones; Wales	14.81
2010	Katrina Hart; England	14.36	Jenny McLoughlin; Wales	14.68	Johanna Benson; Namibia	14.81

=== 800 metres T54 ===
Games	Gold		Silver		Bronze	
2002	Chantal Petitclerc; Canada	1:52.93	Louise Sauvage; Australia	1:53.30	Eliza Stankovic; Australia	1:54.20
2006	Chantal Petitclerc; Canada	1:48.98	Eliza Stankovic; Australia	1:49.62	Diane Roy; Canada	1:53.76

=== 1500 metres T54 ===
Games	Gold		Silver		Bronze	
2010	Diane Roy; Canada	3:53.95	Chineme Obeta; Nigeria	4:09.29	Anita Fordjour; Ghana	4:18.83
2014	Angie Ballard; Australia	3:59.20	Diane Roy; Canada	3:59.55	Jade Jones; England	4:00.19
2018	Madison de Rozario; Australia	3:34.06	Angie Ballard; Australia	3:36.85	Diane Roy; Canada	3:36.97

=== Long jump F37/38 ===
Games	Gold		Silver		Bronze	
2014	Jodi Elkington; Australia	4.39 m	Bethy Woodward; England	4.00 m	Johanna Benson; Namibia	3.82 m

=== Shot put seated ===
Games	Gold		Silver		Bronze	
2006	Eucharia Njideka Iyiazi; Nigeria	6.78 m	Virginia Ohagwu; Nigeria	6.08 m	Asti Poole; Australia	5.33 m

=== Shot put F32-34/52/53 ===
Games	Gold		Silver		Bronze	
2010	Louise Ellery; Australia	1110 (6.17 m)	Jess Hamill; New Zealand	979 (7.17 m)	Gemma Prescott; England	952 (5.54 m)

== Discontinued events ==
=== 80 metres hurdles ===
Games	Gold		Silver		Bronze	
1934	Marjorie Clark (SAF)	11.8	Betty Taylor (CAN)	11.9	Elsie Green; England	12.2
1938	Barbara Burke (SAF)	11.7 w	Isabel Grant; Australia	11.7ew	Rona Tong; New Zealand	11.8ew
1950	Shirley Strickland; Australia	11.6 GR	June Schoch; New Zealand	11.6	Janet Shackleton; New Zealand	11.7
1954	Edna Maskell; Northern Rhodesia	10.9 w	Gwen Hobbins (CAN)	11.2 w	Jean Desforges; England	11.2 w
1958	Norma Thrower; Australia	10.72 w GR	Carole Quinton; England	10.77 w	Gloria Wigney; Australia	10.94 w
1962	Pam Kilborn; Australia	11.07	Betty Moore; England	11.40	Avis McIntosh; New Zealand	11.47
1966	Pam Kilborn; Australia	10.9	Carmen Smith; Jamaica	11.0	Jenny Wingerson; Canada	11.0

=== 100 yards ===
Games	Gold		Silver		Bronze	
1934	Eileen Hiscock; England	11.3	Hilda Strike (CAN)	11.5	Leonard Chalmers; England	11.6
1938	Decima Norman; Australia	11.1	Joyce Walker; Australia	11.3e	Jeanette Dolson (CAN)	11.4e
1950	Marjorie Jackson; Australia	10.8 GR	Shirley Strickland; Australia	11.0	Verna Johnston; Australia	11.1
1954	Marjorie Nelson; Australia	10.7 w	Winsome Cripps; Australia	10.8 w	Edna Maskell; Northern Rhodesia	10.8 w
1958	Marlene Willard; Australia	10.7	Heather Young; England	10.73	Madeleine Weston; England	10.81
1962	Dorothy Hyman; England	11.2	Doreen Porter; New Zealand	11.3	Brenda Cox; Australia	11.4
1966	Dianne Burge; Australia	10.6 GR	Irene Piotrowski; Canada	10.8	Jill Hall; England	10.8

=== 220 yard ===
Games	Gold		Silver		Bronze	
1934	Eileen Hiscock; England	25.0	Aileen Meagher (CAN)	25.4	Nellie Halstead; England	25.6
1938	Decima Norman; Australia	24.7	Jean Coleman; Australia	25.1e	Eileen Wearne; Australia	25.3e
1950	Marjorie Jackson; Australia	24.3 GR	Shirley Strickland; Australia	24.5	Daphne Robb (SAF)	24.7
1954	Marjorie Nelson; Australia	24.0 GR	Winsome Cripps; Australia	24.5	Shirley Hampton; England	25.0
1958	Marlene Willard; Australia	23.65 GR	Betty Cuthbert; Australia	23.77	Heather Young; England	23.9
1962	Dorothy Hyman; England	24.00	Joyce Bennett; Australia	24.21	Margaret Burvill; Australia	24.42
1966	Dianne Burge; Australia	23.73	Jenny Lamy; Australia	23.86	Irene Piotrowski; Canada	23.92

=== 440 yard ===
Games	Gold		Silver		Bronze	
1966	Judy Pollock; Australia	53.0	Deidre Watkinson; England	54.1	Una Morris; Jamaica	54.2

=== 880 yard ===
Games	Gold		Silver		Bronze	
1934	Gladys Lunn; England	2:19.4	Ida Jones; England	2:21.0	Dorothy Butterfield; England	2:21.4
1962	Dixie Willis; Australia	2:03.85; GR	Marise Chamberlain; New Zealand	2:05.66	Joy Jordan; England	2:05.96
1966	Abby Hoffman; Canada	2:04.3	Judy Pollock; Australia	2:04.5	Anne Smith; England	2:05.0

=== 20 kilometres race walk ===
Games	Gold		Silver		Bronze	
2002	Jane Saville; Australia	1:36.34 GR	Lisa Kehler; England	1:36.45	Yuan Yufang; Malaysia	1:40.00
2006	Jane Saville; Australia	1:32:46 GR	Natalie Saville; Australia	1:33:33	Cheryl Webb; Australia	1:36:03
2010	Johanna Jackson; England	1:34:22	Claire Tallent; Australia	1:36:55	Grace Njue; Kenya	1:37:49
2018	Jemima Montag; Australia	1:32:50	Alana Barber; New Zealand	1:34:18	Bethan Davies; Wales	1:36:08

=== 4 × 110 yards relay ===
Games	Gold		Silver		Bronze	
1954	Australia; Gwen Wallace; Marjorie Nelson; Nancy Fogarty; Winsome Cripps	46.8 GR	England; Anne Pashley; Heather Young; Shirley Burgess; Shirley Hampton	46.9	Canada; Annabelle Murray; Dorothy Kozak; Geraldine Bemister; Margery Squires	47.8
1958	England; Madeleine Weston; Dorothy Hyman; June Paul; Heather Young	45.37 (WR)	Australia; Betty Cuthbert; Kay Johnson; Marlene Mathews-Willard; Wendy Hayes	46.12	Canada; Diane Matheson; Eleanor Haslam; Freyda Berman; Maureen Rever	47.21
1962	Australia; Brenda Cox; Betty Cuthbert; Glenys Beasley; Joyce Bennett	46.71	England; Ann Packer; Dorothy Hyman; Daphne Arden; Betty Moore	46.81	New Zealand; Avis McIntosh; Doreen Porter; Yvonne Cowan; Nola Bond	46.93
1966	Australia; Dianne Burge; Jenny Lamy; Joyce Bennett; Pamela Ryan	45.3 GR	England; Daphne Slater; Janet Simpson; Jill Hall; Maureen Tranter	45.6	Jamaica; Adlin Mair-Clarke; Carmen Smith; Una Morris; Vilma Charlton	45.6

=== 110-220-110 yards relay ===
Games	Gold		Silver		Bronze	
1934	England; Eileen Hiscock; Nellie Halstead; Elsie Maguire	49.4	Canada; Audrey Dearnley; Aileen Meagher; Hilda Strike	50.2e	Southern Rhodesia; Cynthia Keay; Dorothy Ballantyne; Mollie Bragg	52.0e
1938	Australia; Eileen Wearne; Decima Norman; Jean Coleman	49.1	Canada; Barbara Howard; Aileen Meagher; Jeanette Dolson	49.9e	England; Dorothy Saunders; Kathleen Stokes; Winifred Jeffrey	51.3e
1950	Australia; Marjorie Jackson; Shirley Strickland; Verna Johnston	47.9 GR	New Zealand; Lesley Rowe; Dorothea Parker; Shirley Hardman	48.7	England; Dorothy Hall; Margaret Walker; Sylvia Cheeseman	50.0

=== 220-110-220-110 relay ===
Games	Gold		Silver		Bronze	
1934	Canada; Audrey Dearnley; Betty White; Aileen Meagher; Lillian Palmer	1:14.4	England; Eileen Hiscock; Nellie Halstead; Ethel Johnson; Ivy Walker	?	Scotland; Cathie Jackson; Joan Cunningham; Margaret Mackenzie; Sheena Dobbie	
1938	Australia; Decima Norman; Jean Coleman; Joan Woodland; Thelma Peake	1:15.2	England; Dorothy Saunders; Ethel Raby; Kathleen Stokes; Winifred Jeffrey	1:17.2e	Canada; Barbara Howard; Aileen Meagher; Jeanette Dolson; Violet Montgomery	1:19.0e
1950	Australia; Ann Shanley; Marjorie Jackson; Shirley Strickland; Verna Johnston	1:13.4 GR	England; Doris Batter; Dorothy Hall; Margaret Walker; Sylvia Cheeseman	1:17.5	Canada; Elaine Silburn; Eleanor McKenzie; Gerry Bemister; Patricia Jones	Unknown

=== Pentathlon ===
Games	Gold		Silver		Bronze	
1970	Mary Peters; Northern Ireland	5148 pts GR	Ann Wilson; England	5037 pts	Jenny Meldrum; Canada	4736 pts
1974	Mary Peters; Northern Ireland	4455 pts	Modupe Oshikoya; Nigeria	4423 pts	Ann Wilson; England	4236 pts
1978	Diane Konihowski; Canada	4768 pts GR	Sue Mapstone; England	4222 pts	Yvette Wray; England	4211 pts
