= Athletics at the 1962 British Empire and Commonwealth Games – Women's 220 yards =

Women's 220 yards at the 1962 British Empire and Commonwealth Games
- Venue: Perry Lakes Stadium
- Date: 26 November 1962 (round 1 and semis); 29 November 1962 (final)
- Competitors: 22 from 10 nations
- Winning time: 23.8 s

Medalists
gold medal	Dorothy Hyman	England
silver medal	Joyce Bennett	Australia
bronze medal	Margaret Burvill	Australia

The women's 220 yards at the 1962 British Empire and Commonwealth Games as part of the athletics programme was held at the Perry Lakes Stadium on Monday 26 November and Thursday 29 November 1962.

22 runners competed in four heats in the first round, with the top three runners from each heat qualifying for the semifinals. There were two semifinals, and only the top three from each heat advanced to the final.

The event was won by England's Dorothy Hyman in 23.8 seconds, who also won the 100 yard event earlier in the meet. Hyman finished ahead of the Australian pair of Joyce Bennett and Margaret Burvill. It was the first time since 1938 that this event was not won by an Australian.

== Records ==
World record	Betty Cuthbert (AUS)	23.2	Hobart, Australia	7 March 1960
Commonwealth record				
Games record	Marlene Mathews (AUS)	23.6	Cardiff, Wales	24 July 1958

== Round 1 ==
=== Heat 1 ===
Rank	Name	Nationality	Time	Notes
1	Joyce Bennett	Australia	24.4	Q
2	Dorothy Hyman	England	24.5	Q
3	Yvonne Cowan	New Zealand	25.0	Q
4	Carmen Williams	Jamaica	26.8	
5	Maca Vakalala	Fiji	27.1	
	Janette Neil	Scotland		DNS

=== Heat 2 ===
Rank	Name	Nationality	Time	Notes
1	Margaret Burvill	Australia	24.4	Q
2	Ann Packer	England	24.8	Q
3	Nola Bond	New Zealand	25.5	Q
4	Joan Atkinson	Northern Ireland	25.6	
5	Carmen Smith	Jamaica	25.9	
6	Patricia Dalton	Rhodesia and Nyasaland	26.2	

=== Heat 3 ===
Rank	Name	Nationality	Time	Notes
1	Doreen Porter	New Zealand	24.7	Q
2	Betty Cuthbert	Australia	24.9	Q
3	Joy Grieveson	England	25.2	Q
4	Christiana Boateng	Ghana	25.5	
5	Adlin Mair	Jamaica	26.5	

=== Heat 4 ===
Rank	Name	Nationality	Time	Notes
1	Brenda Cox	Australia	24.7	Q
2	Daphne Arden	England	24.8	Q
3	Yvonne Breeden	Canada	25.3	Q
4	Rose Hart	Ghana	25.6	
5	Ouida Walker	Jamaica	26.0	

== Semifinals ==
=== Semifinal 1 ===
Rank	Name	Nationality	Time	Notes
1	Dorothy Hyman	England	24.0	Q
2	Margaret Burvill	Australia	24.1	Q
3	Brenda Cox	Australia	24.1	Q
4	Ann Packer	England	24.5	
5	Nola Bond	New Zealand	25.4	
6	Yvonne Breeden	Canada	25.5	

=== Semifinal 2 ===
Rank	Name	Nationality	Time	Notes
1	Joyce Bennett	Australia	24.0	Q
2	Betty Cuthbert	Australia	24.3	Q
3	Doreen Porter	New Zealand	24.6	Q
4	Daphne Arden	England	24.7	
5	Yvonne Cowan	New Zealand	25.0	
6	Joy Grieveson	England	25.1	

== Final ==
Rank	Name	Nationality	Time	Notes
1st place, gold medalist(s)	Dorothy Hyman	England	23.8	
2nd place, silver medalist(s)	Joyce Bennett	Australia	24.2	
3rd place, bronze medalist(s)	Margaret Burvill	Australia	24.5	
4	Brenda Cox	Australia	24.5	
5	Betty Cuthbert	Australia	24.6	
6	Doreen Porter	New Zealand	24.8	
			Wind: +3.0 m/s	
