= Athletics at the 1962 British Empire and Commonwealth Games – Women's 4 × 110 yards relay =

Women's 4 × 110 yards relay at the 1962 British Empire and Commonwealth Games
- Venue: Perry Lakes Stadium
- Date: 1 December 1962
- Teams: 5
- Winning time: 46.6

Medalists
gold medal	Joyce Bennett; Glenys Beasley; Brenda Cox; Betty Cuthbert	Australia
silver medal	Ann Packer; Dorothy Hyman; Daphne Arden; Betty Moore	England
bronze medal	Nola Bond; Yvonne Cowan; Doreen Porter; Avis McIntosh	New Zealand

The women's 4 × 110 yards relay at the 1962 British Empire and Commonwealth Games as part of the athletics programme was held at the Perry Lakes Stadium on Saturday 1 December 1962.

The event was won Australian team of Joyce Bennett, Glenys Beasley, Brenda Cox and Betty Cuthbert in a time of 46.6. They narrowly finished ahead of English team of Ann Packer, Dorothy Hyman, Daphne Arden and Betty Moore and the New Zealand quartet of Nola Bond, Yvonne Cowan, Doreen Porter and Avis McIntosh who won bronze. England was leading by five yards coming in the final baton change, however Moore started her run too early and had to stop almost dead before receiving the baton. This cost England dearly as Cuthbert caught Moore two yards from the finish.

== Records ==
World record	England (Madeleine Weston, Dorothy Hyman, June Paul, Heather Young)	45.3	Cardiff, Wales	27 July 1958
Commonwealth record				
Games record	England (Madeleine Weston, Dorothy Hyman, June Paul, Heather Young)	45.3	Cardiff, Wales	27 July 1958

== Final ==
Rank	Nation	Competitors	Time	Notes
1st place, gold medalist(s)	Australia	Joyce Bennett, Glenys Beasley, Brenda Cox, Betty Cuthbert	46.6	
2nd place, silver medalist(s)	England	Ann Packer, Dorothy Hyman, Daphne Arden, Betty Moore	46.6	
3rd place, bronze medalist(s)	New Zealand	Nola Bond, Yvonne Cowan, Doreen Porter, Avis McIntosh	46.9	
4	Jamaica	Ouida Walker, Carmen Smith, Carmen Williams, Adlin Mair	48.6	
5	Ghana	Christiana Boateng, Rose Hart, Matilda Adjei, Victoria Chinery	49.0	
