= Athletics at the 1962 British Empire and Commonwealth Games – Women's 100 yards =

Athletics event

Women's 100 yards at the 1962 British Empire and Commonwealth Games
- Venue: Perry Lakes Stadium, Floreat, Western Australia
- Date: 24 November 1962 (round 1 and semis); 26 November 1962 (final)
- Competitors: 23 from 10 nations
- Winning time: 11.2 s

Medalists
gold medal	Dorothy Hyman	England
silver medal	Doreen Porter	New Zealand
bronze medal	Brenda Cox	Australia

Official video

The women's 100 yards at the 1962 British Empire and Commonwealth Games as part of the athletics programme was held at the Perry Lakes Stadium on Saturday 24 November and Monday 26 November 1962.

23 runners competed in four heats in the first round, with the top three runners from each heat qualifying for the semifinals. There were two semifinals, and only the top three from each heat advanced to the final.

The event was won by England's Dorothy Hyman ahead of Doreen Porter from New Zealand and Australian Brenda Cox who won bronze. Hyman won the final in a slow time of 11.2 seconds running into a headwind of 5.8 m/s. It was the first time since 1934 that this event was not won by an Australian.

== Records ==
World record	Marlene Mathews (AUS)	10.3	Sydney, Australia	20 March 1958
Commonwealth record				
Games record	Marlene Mathews (AUS)	10.6	Cardiff, Wales	22 July 1958

== Round 1 ==
=== Heat 1 ===
Rank	Name	Nationality	Time	Notes
1	Glenys Beasley	Australia	11.0	Q
2	Ann Packer	England	11.3	Q
3	Yvonne Breeden	Canada	11.4	Q
4	Carmen Williams	Jamaica	11.9	
5	Janette Neil	Scotland	12.0	
6	Grace Hogan	Ghana	12.5	

=== Heat 2 ===
Rank	Name	Nationality	Time	Notes
1	Dorothy Hyman	England	11.0	Q
2	Brenda Cox	Australia	11.1	Q
3	Christiana Boateng	Ghana	11.2	Q
4	Yvonne Cowan	New Zealand	11.6	
5	Joan Atkinson	Northern Ireland	11.6	
6	Adlin Mair	Jamaica	11.7	

=== Heat 3 ===
Rank	Name	Nationality	Time	Notes
1	Betty Moore	England	11.0	Q
2	Betty Cuthbert	Australia	11.1	Q
3	Nola Bond	New Zealand	11.2	Q
4	Carmen Smith	Jamaica	11.4	
5	Maca Vakalala	Fiji	11.6	
6	Patricia Dalton	Rhodesia and Nyasaland	11.8	

=== Heat 4 ===
Rank	Name	Nationality	Time	Notes
1	Doreen Porter	New Zealand	10.9	Q
2	Joyce Bennett	Australia	11.1	Q
3	Daphne Arden	England	11.1	Q
4	Rose Hart	Ghana	11.4	
5	Ouida Walker	Jamaica	11.5	

== Semifinals ==
=== Semifinal 1 ===
Rank	Name	Nationality	Time	Notes
1	Dorothy Hyman	England	10.7	Q
2	Christiana Boateng	Ghana	10.9	Q
3	Daphne Arden	England	10.9	Q
4	Glenys Beasley	Australia	11.0	
5	Betty Cuthbert	Australia	11.0	
6	Nola Bond	New Zealand	11.2	

=== Semifinal 2 ===
Rank	Name	Nationality	Time	Notes
1	Brenda Cox	Australia	10.9	Q
2	Doreen Porter	New Zealand	11.0	Q
3	Betty Moore	England	11.0	Q
4	Joyce Bennett	Australia	11.1	
5	Ann Packer	England	11.2	
6	Yvonne Breeden	Canada	11.5	

== Final ==
Rank	Name	Nationality	Time	Notes
1st place, gold medalist(s)	Dorothy Hyman	England	11.2	
2nd place, silver medalist(s)	Doreen Porter	New Zealand	11.3	
3rd place, bronze medalist(s)	Brenda Cox	Australia	11.4	
4	Christiana Boateng	Ghana	11.6	
5	Daphne Arden	England	11.6	
6	Betty Moore	England	11.7	
			Wind: -5.8 m/s	
