= Athletics at the 1966 British Empire and Commonwealth Games – Women's 80 metres hurdles =

Women's 80 metres hurdles at the 1966 British Empire and Commonwealth Games
- Venue: Independence Park, Kingston
- Dates: August 11 and 13, 1966

Medalists
gold medal	Pam Kilborn	Australia
silver medal	Carmen Smith	Jamaica
bronze medal	Jenny Wingerson	Canada

The women's 80 metres hurdles event at the 1966 British Empire and Commonwealth Games was held on 11 and 13 August at the Independence Park in Kingston, Jamaica. It was the last time that the distance was contested at the Games: in 1970 it was replaced by the 100 metres hurdles.

== Medalists ==
Medallists
Gold	Silver	Bronze
Pam Kilborn; Australia	Carmen Smith; Jamaica	Jenny Wingerson; Canada

== Results ==
=== Heats ===
==== Qualification for final ====
The first 4 in each heat (Q) qualified directly for the final.

==== Wind speed ====
Heat 1: ? m/s, Heat 2: +0.5 m/s

Heats results
Rank	Heat	Name	Nationality	Time	Notes
1	1	Catherine Chapman	Canada	11.1	Q
2	1	Carmen Smith	Jamaica	11.1	Q
3	1	Patricia Pryce	England	11.3	Q
4	1	Violet Odogwu	Nigeria	11.5	Q
5	1	Diana Monks	Kenya	11.6	
6	1	Thora Best	Trinidad and Tobago	11.9	
	1	Mary Rand	England	DNS	
	1	Millicent Jackson	Sierra Leone	DNS	
1	2	Pam Kilborn	Australia	10.8	Q
2	2	Jenny Wingerson	Canada	11.0	Q
3	2	Brenda Matthews	New Zealand	11.1	Q
4	2	Ann Wilson	England	11.2	Q
5	2	Rose Hart	Ghana	11.3	
6	2	Doreldene Pagan	Jamaica	11.4	

=== Final ===
==== Wind speed ====
0.0 m/s

Final results
Rank	Name	Nationality	Time	Notes
1st place, gold medalist(s)	Pam Kilborn	Australia	10.9	
2nd place, silver medalist(s)	Carmen Smith	Jamaica	11.0	
3rd place, bronze medalist(s)	Jenny Wingerson	Canada	11.0	
4	Catherine Chapman	Canada	11.1	
5	Patricia Pryce	England	11.1	
6	Ann Wilson	England	11.2	
7	Brenda Matthews	New Zealand	11.3	
8	Violet Odogwu	Nigeria	11.5	
