= Jamaica at the 1962 British Empire and Commonwealth Games =

- CG code: JAM
- CGA: Jamaica Olympic Association
- Website: www.joa.org.jm

in Perth, Western Australia
- Flag bearers: Opening: Closing:
- Medals Ranked 8thth: Gold 3 Silver 1 Bronze 1 Total 5

British Empire and Commonwealth Games appearances
- 1934; 1938–1950; 1954; 1958; 1962; 1966; 1970; 1974; 1978; 1982; 1986; 1990; 1994; 1998; 2002; 2006; 2010; 2014; 2018; 2022; 2026; 2030

Jamaica competed at the 1962 British Empire and Commonwealth Games in Perth, Western Australia, from 22 November to 1 December 1962.

== Medalists ==
Medal	Name	Sport	Event	Date
Gold	George Kerr	Athletics	Men's 440 yards	29 November
Gold	George Kerr; Laurie Khan; Malcolm Spence; Mel Spence	Athletics	Men's 4 × 440 yards relay	1 December
Silver	George Kerr	Athletics	Men's 880 yards	26 November
Bronze	Wellesley Clayton	Athletics	Men's long jump	26 November

== Athletics ==
Men
Track events

Athlete	Event	Round 1		Round 2		Semifinal		Final	
Athlete	Event	Result	Rank	Result	Rank	Result	Rank	Result	Rank
Dennis Johnson	100 yd	9.6	1 Q	9.8	1 Q	9.7	3 Q	9.9	5
Dennis Johnson	220 yd	DNS		Did not advance					
George Kerr	440 yd	47.5	1 Q	—N/a		46.9	1 Q	46.7	1st place, gold medalist(s)
Laurie Khan	440 yd	48.8	3	—N/a		Did not advance			
Malcolm Spence	440 yd	47.0	1 Q	—N/a		47.8	2 Q	47.7	5
Mel Spence	440 yd	47.9	2 Q	—N/a		47.2	3	47.8	6
George Kerr	880 yd	1:51.3	2 Q	—N/a		1:50.4	1 Q	1:47.8	2nd place, silver medalist(s)
Mel Spence	880 yd	1:52.3	3	—N/a		Did not advance			
George Kerr; Laurie Khan; Malcolm Spence; Mel Spence	4×440 yd relay	3:12.1	1 Q	—N/a				3:10.2	1st place, gold medalist(s)

Field events

Athlete	Event	Final	
Athlete	Event	Distance	Rank
Victor Brooks	Long jump	23 ft 8 1/2 in (7.23 m)	13
Wellesley Clayton	Long jump	25 ft 4 1/4 in (7.73 m)	3rd place, bronze medalist(s)
Mahoney Samuels	Triple jump	50 ft 10 1/4 in (15.50 m)	5

Women
Track events

Athlete	Event	Round 1		Semifinal		Final	
Athlete	Event	Result	Rank	Result	Rank	Result	Rank
Adlin Mair	100 yd	11.7	6	Did not advance			
Carmen Smith	100 yd	11.4	4	Did not advance			
Ouida Walker	100 yd	11.5	5	Did not advance			
Carmen Williams	100 yd	11.9	4	Did not advance			
Adlin Mair	220 yd	26.5	5	Did not advance			
Carmen Smith	220 yd	25.9	5	Did not advance			
Ouida Walker	220 yd	26.0	5	Did not advance			
Carmen Williams	220 yd	26.8	4	Did not advance			
Adlin Mair	80 m hurdles	12.1	5	—N/a		Did not advance	
Carmen Smith	80 m hurdles	DNF		—N/a		Did not advance	
Adlin Mair; Carmen Smith; Ouida Walker; Carmen Williams	4×110 yd relay	—N/a				48.6	4

Field events

Athlete	Event	Final	
Athlete	Event	Distance	Rank
Dorothy Yates	Long jump	16 ft 4 1/2 in (4.99 m)	10

== See also ==
- British West Indies at the 1960 Summer Olympics
- Jamaica at the 1964 Summer Olympics
