= Athletics at the 1962 British Empire and Commonwealth Games – Women's 80 metres hurdles =

80 metres hurdles at the 1962 British Empire and Commonwealth Games
- Venue: Perry Lakes Stadium
- Date: 29 November 1962 (round 1); 1 December 1962 (final)
- Competitors: 13 from 7 nations
- Winning time: 10.9 s

Medalists
gold medal	Pam Kilborn	Australia
silver medal	Betty Moore	England
bronze medal	Avis McIntosh	New Zealand

The women's 80 metres hurdles at the 1962 British Empire and Commonwealth Games as part of the athletics programme was held at the Perry Lakes Stadium on Thursday 29 November and Saturday 1 December 1962.

13 runners competed in two heats in the first round, with the top three runners from each heat qualifying for the final.

The event was won by Australia's Pam Kilborn ahead of the joint world record holder Betty Moore from England and New Zealander Avis McIntosh who won bronze. Kilborn won the final in a slow time of 10.9 seconds running into a headwind of 7.0 m/s.

== Records ==
World record	Gisela Birkemeyer (GDR); Betty Moore (GBR)	10.5	Leipzig, East Germany; Kassel, West Germany	24 July 1960; 25 August 1962
Commonwealth record				
Games record	Norma Thrower (AUS)	10.7	Cardiff, Wales	27 July 1958

== Round 1 ==
=== Heat 1 ===
Rank	Name	Nationality	Time	Notes
1	Avis McIntosh	New Zealand	10.8	Q
2	Betty Moore	England	10.8	Q
3	Margot Evans	Australia	11.2	Q
4	Rose Hart	Ghana	11.4	
5	Frances Slaap	England	12.0	
	Carmen Smith	Jamaica		DNF

=== Heat 2 ===
Rank	Name	Nationality	Time	Notes
1	Pam Kilborn	Australia	10.8	Q
2	Pat Nutting	England	11.4	Q
3	Ann Packer	England	11.4	Q
4	Patricia Dalton	Rhodesia and Nyasaland	11.9	
5	Adlin Mair	Jamaica	12.1	
6	Victoria Chinery	Ghana	12.4	
	Thelma Hopkins	Northern Ireland		DNS

== Final ==
Rank	Name	Nationality	Time	Notes
1st place, gold medalist(s)	Pam Kilborn	Australia	10.9	
2nd place, silver medalist(s)	Betty Moore	England	11.3	
3rd place, bronze medalist(s)	Avis McIntosh	New Zealand	11.4	
4	Pat Nutting	England	11.5	
5	Margot Evans	Australia	11.9	
6	Ann Packer	England	11.9	
			Wind: -7.0 m/s	
