= Athletics at the 1970 British Commonwealth Games – Women's 4 × 100 metres relay =

Women's 4 × 100 metres relay at the 1970 British Commonwealth Games
- Venue: Meadowbank Stadium, Edinburgh
- Dates: 25 July

Medalists
gold medal	Jennifer Lamy, Pam Kilborn, Marion Hoffman, Raelene Boyle	Australia
silver medal	Anita Neil, Margaret Critchley, Madeleine Cobb, Val Peat	England
bronze medal	Joan Hendry, Joyce Sadowick, Patty Loverock, Stephanie Berto	Canada

The women's 4 × 100 metres relay event at the 1970 British Commonwealth Games was held on 25 July at the Meadowbank Stadium in Edinburgh, Scotland. It was the first time that the metric distance was contested at the Games, replacing the 4 × 110 yards relay.

== Results ==
Final result
Rank		Athletes	Time	Notes
1st place, gold medalist(s)	Australia	Jennifer Lamy, Pam Kilborn, Marion Hoffman, Raelene Boyle	44.14	
2nd place, silver medalist(s)	England	Anita Neil, Margaret Critchley, Madeleine Cobb, Val Peat	44.28	
3rd place, bronze medalist(s)	Canada	Joan Hendry, Joyce Sadowick, Patty Loverock, Stephanie Berto	44.68	
4	Scotland	Anne Wilson, Elizabeth Sutherland, Helen Golden, Patricia Pennycook	45.4	
5	Jamaica	Adlin Mair-Clarke, Carmen Smith-Brown, Marilyn Neufville, Yvonne Saunders	45.5	
6	Wales	Hillary Davies, Michelle Smith, Pat Shiels, Ruth Martin-Jones	46.5	
7	Northern Ireland	Adrienne Smyth, Linda Teskey, Maeve Kyle, Nooline McGarvey	46.7	
8	Nigeria	Emille Edet, Evelyn Urhobo, Modupe Oshikoya, Olajumoke Bodunrin	47.0	
