= Athletics at the 1958 British Empire and Commonwealth Games – Women's high jump =

Women's high jump at the Commonwealth Games

The women's high jump event at the 1958 British Empire and Commonwealth Games was held on 22 July at the Cardiff Arms Park in Cardiff, Wales.

== Results ==
Rank	Name	Nationality	Result	Notes
1st place, gold medalist(s)	Michele Mason	Australia	5 ft 7 in (1.70 m)	
2nd place, silver medalist(s)	Mary Donaghy	New Zealand	5 ft 7 in (1.70 m)	
3rd place, bronze medalist(s)	Helen Frith	Australia	5 ft 5 in (1.65 m)	
4	Dorothy Shirley	England	5 ft 5 in (1.65 m)	
5	Mary Rand	England	5 ft 4 in (1.63 m)	
6	Audrey Banfield	England	5 ft 4 in (1.63 m)	
7	Jean Card	England	5 ft 2 in (1.57 m)	
8	Thelma Hopkins	Northern Ireland	5 ft 2 in (1.57 m)	
9	Violet Odogwu	Nigeria	5 ft 2 in (1.57 m)	
10	Amelia Okoli	Nigeria	4 ft 10 in (1.47 m)	
10	Mary Peters	Northern Ireland	4 ft 10 in (1.47 m)	
10	Alix Jamieson	Scotland	4 ft 10 in (1.47 m)	
13	Jestina Ashwood	Sierra Leone	4 ft 10 in (1.47 m)	
	Florette Iyo	Nigeria	NM	
