= Athletics at the 1962 British Empire and Commonwealth Games – Women's long jump =

Women's long jump at the 1962 British Empire and Commonwealth Games
- Venue: Perry Lakes Stadium
- Date: 1 December 1962
- Competitors: 10 from 6 nations
- Winning distance: 20 ft 6 3/4 in (6.27 m)

Medalists
gold medal	Pam Kilborn	Australia
silver medal	Helen Frith	Australia
bronze medal	Janet Knee	Australia

The women's long jump at the 1962 British Empire and Commonwealth Games as part of the athletics programme was held at the Perry Lakes Stadium on Saturday 1 December 1962.

The event was won by 23-year-old Australian Pam Kilborn with a jump of 20 ft 6 3/4 in (6.27 m). Kilborn won by one inch ahead of her fellow countrywomen Helen Frith, her training partner and Janet Knee. Bickle's jump was well ahead of the games record set by Yvette Williams of New Zealand set in Vancouver eight years prior but due to the tailwind could not be ratified.

This was one five events at the 1962 Games where Australia won the clean sweep of medals. The others were the women's high jump, the men's 440 yard and 1650 yard freestyles and the men's 220 yard butterfly.

== Records ==
World record	Tatyana Shchelkanova (URS)	21 ft 3 in (6.48 m)	Moscow, Soviet Union	16 July 1961
Commonwealth record				
Games record	Yvette Williams (NZL)	19 ft 11 1/2 in (6.08 m)	Vancouver, Canada	7 August 1954

== Final ==
Rank	Name	Nationality	Result	Notes
1st place, gold medalist(s)	Pam Kilborn	Australia	20 ft 6 3/4 in (6.27 m)	
2nd place, silver medalist(s)	Helen Frith	Australia	20 ft 5 3/4 in (6.24 m)	
3rd place, bronze medalist(s)	Janet Knee	Australia	20 ft 1 1/4 in (6.13 m)	
4	Eva Kampe	Australia	19 ft 3 3/4 in (5.89 m)	
5	Sheila Sherwood	England	19 ft 3 1/4 in (5.87 m)	
6	Thelma Hopkins	Northern Ireland	18 ft 9 1/4 in (5.72 m)	
7	Pat Nutting	England	18 ft 4 in (5.59 m)	
8	Janette Neil	Scotland	17 ft 10 in (5.44 m)	
9	Christiana Boateng	Ghana	17 ft 1 1/4 in (5.21 m)	
10	Dorothy Yates	Jamaica	16 ft 4 1/2 in (4.99 m)	
