= Athletics at the 1962 British Empire and Commonwealth Games – Women's high jump =

Women's high jump at the 1962 British Empire and Commonwealth Games
- Venue: Perry Lakes Stadium
- Date: 26 November 1962
- Competitors: 11 from 4 nations
- Winning height: 5 ft 10 in (1.78 m) GR CR Aust.R WA. R

Medalists
gold medal	Robyn Woodhouse	Australia
silver medal	Helen Frith	Australia
bronze medal	Michele Mason	Australia

The women's high jump at the 1962 British Empire and Commonwealth Games as part of the athletics programme was held at the Perry Lakes Stadium on Monday 26 November 1962.

The event was won by 19-year-old Australian Robyn Woodhouse in her first international competition. Woodhouse won by two inches ahead of her fellow countrywomen Helen Frith and Michele Mason, the defending champion. Woodhouse's jump of 5 ft 10 in (1.78 m) set four new records. It broke the British Empire and Commonwealth record by one inch, Mason's Games record set in Cardiff by three inches, the Australian open (all-comers) record of American Mildred McDaniel by 3/4 of an inch and Mason's Australian national record by one inch. The jump placed Woodhouse only behind the world record holder, Romania's Iolanda Balaș, who had cleared 6 ft 3 in (1.91 m).

This was one five events at the 1962 Games where Australia won the clean sweep of medals. The others were the women's long jump, the men's 440 yard freestyle, men's 1650 yard freestyle and the men's 220 yard butterfly.

== Records ==
World record	Iolanda Balaș (ROM)	6 ft 3 in (1.91 m)	Sofia, Bulgaria	16 July 1961
Commonwealth record				
Games record	Michele Mason (AUS); Mary Donaghy (NZL)	5 ft 7 in (1.70 m)	Cardiff, Wales	23 July 1958

== Final ==
Rank	Name	Nationality	Result	Notes
1st place, gold medalist(s)	Robyn Woodhouse	Australia	5 ft 10 in (1.78 m)	GR, CR
2nd place, silver medalist(s)	Helen Frith	Australia	5 ft 8 in (1.73 m)	
3rd place, bronze medalist(s)	Michele Mason	Australia	5 ft 8 in (1.73 m)	
4	Linda Knowles	England	5 ft 8 in (1.73 m)	
5	Frances Slaap	England	5 ft 7 in (1.70 m)	
6	Carolyn Wright	Australia	5 ft 7 in (1.70 m)	
7	Dorothy Shirley	England	5 ft 6 in (1.68 m)	
8	Lorraine Curtis	New Zealand	5 ft 5 in (1.65 m)	
9	Thelma Hopkins	Northern Ireland	5 ft 5 in (1.65 m)	
10	Pamela Burnett	New Zealand	5 ft 3 in (1.60 m)	
	Mary Peters	Northern Ireland		DNS
