= Paul Gibbons (athlete) =

New Zealand pole vaulter (born 1971)

Personal information
- Born: Paul Kendall Gibbons; 25 June 1971 (age 55) New Plymouth, New Zealand
- Height: 1.78 m (5 ft 10 in)
- Weight: 62 kg (137 lb)
- Relative: Yvonne Cowan (mother)

Sport
- Country: New Zealand
- Sport: Track and field
- Event: Pole vault

Achievements and titles
- National finals: Pole vault champion (1991, 1993, 1994, 1996, 1997, 1999, 2000, 2001, 2003, 2004)
- Personal best: 5.51 m

Paul Kendall Gibbons (born 25 June 1971) is a former New Zealand pole vaulter. He competed for his native country at the 1990 Commonwealth Games and the 1992 Summer Olympics. He set his personal best (5.51 metres) in 1992 and equalled it in 1997. He won the New Zealand pole vault title ten times between 1991 and 2004.

== Early life and family ==
Gibbons was born in New Plymouth on 25 June 1971, the son of Yvonne and Kevin Gibbons. His father was also a pole vaulter, and won the national championship in that event on seven occasions between 1963 and 1970.

Gibbons was educated at Palm Beach Currumbin State High School in Queensland, Australia, and at Howick College in Auckland.

== Pole vault ==
In 1990, Gibbons represented New Zealand in the pole vault at the 1990 Commonwealth Games in Auckland. He placed 7th, with a height of 5.10 metres. Also in 1990, he competed in the pole vault at the 1990 World Junior Championships in Athletics, but did not progress beyond the qualifying round after recording no height. Gibbons was awarded the New Zealand 1990 Commemoration Medal.

The following year, Gibbons broke the national pole vault record, with a vault of 5.26 metres, and it was the first time that a father and son had held a New Zealand senior athletics record in the same event. He went to the 1991 World Championships in Athletics in Tokyo, where he cleared 5.40 metres in qualifying but did not progress to the final.

On 25 January 1992, Gibbons became the first New Zealander to clear 5.50 metres in the pole vault, when he recorded a height of 5.51 m. He would equal this personal best five years later, on 9 July 1997. Competing in the pole vault at the 1992 Summer Olympics, Gibbons was eliminated in the qualifying round with no official mark.

Gibbons won the pole vault title at the New Zealand Athletics Championships ten times between 1991 and 2004.

=== Personal bests ===
Event	Height	Place	Date
Pole vault	5.51 m NR	North Shore	25 January 1992
Pole vault	5.51 m NR	Blackburn	9 July 1997
