= Mary Breen =

Australian shot putter

Personal information
- Nationality: Australian
- Born: 3 January 1933
- Died: 1 October 1977 (aged 44)

Sport
- Sport: Athletics
- Event: Shot put

Mary Breen (3 January 1933 – 1 October 1977) was an Australian athlete. She competed in the women's shot put at the 1956 Summer Olympics.
