= Jamaica at the Commonwealth Games =

- CGF code: JAM
- CGA: Jamaica Olympic Association
- Website: joa.org.jm
- Officials: 0
- Medals Ranked 12th: Gold 59 Silver 47 Bronze 55 Total 161

Commonwealth Games appearances (overview)
- 1934; 1938–1950; 1954; 1958; 1962; 1966; 1970; 1974; 1978; 1982; 1986; 1990; 1994; 1998; 2002; 2006; 2010; 2014; 2018; 2022; 2026; 2030

Jamaica has competed in seventeen of the twenty previous Commonwealth Games; starting at the second Games in 1934.

== Host nation ==
Jamaica has hosted the Games once, in 1966 at Kingston. This was the first time a non-white Commonwealth nation has hosted the Games.

== Overall medal tally ==
At the 2006 Commonwealth Games, Jamaica was seventh in the medal tally, and was tenth in the All-time tally of medals, with an overall total of 105 medals (40 Gold, 30 Silver and 35 Bronze).

* Host nation (Host country (Jamaica))

Games	Gold	Silver	Bronze	Total
1934 London	0	1	1	2
1954 Vancouver	1	0	0	1
1958 Cardiff	4	2	1	7
1962 Perth	3	1	1	5
1966 Kingston*	0	4	8	12
1970 Edinburgh	4	2	1	7
1974 Christchurch	2	1	0	3
1978 Edmonton	2	2	3	7
1982 Brisbane	2	1	1	4
1990 Auckland	2	0	2	4
1994 Victoria	2	4	2	8
1998 Kuala Lumpur	4	2	0	6
2002 Manchester	4	6	7	17
2006 Melbourne	10	4	8	22
2010 Delhi	2	4	1	7
2014 Glasgow	10	4	8	22
2018 Gold Coast	7	9	11	27
Totals (17 entries)	59	47	55	161
