= Brenda Cox =

Australian sprinter

Personal information
- Born: Brenda Cox; 17 April 1944 Queensland
- Died: 6 May 2016 (aged 72) Queensland

Sport
- Country: Australia
Medal record
Women's athletics
Representing Australia
Commonwealth Games
Gold medal – first place	1962 Perth	Women's 4 × 110 yards relay
Bronze medal – third place	1962 Perth	Women's 100 yards

Brenda Cox (17 April 1944 – 6 May 2016) was an Australian sprinter. At the 1962 British Empire and Commonwealth Games in Perth she won bronze over 100 yards, finished fourth over 220 yards and won gold with the Australian 4 x 110-yard team. She died in May 2016 at age 72.

== Personal bests ==
- 100 yards: 10.5s, 18 March 1961, Sydney, Australia
- 220 yards: 23.9s, 23 March 1963, Brisbane, Australia
