= Pam Kilborn =

Australian hurdler (born 1939)

Pam Kilborn née Ryan AM MBE
Personal information
- Full name: Pamela Kilborn
- Born: 12 August 1939 (age 87) Melbourne, Victoria, Australia
- Height: 5 ft 1 1/2 in (156 cm)
- Weight: 115 lb (52 kg)

Sport
- Sport: Track & Field
- Event: Hurdles
Medal record
Women's Athletics
Representing Australia
Olympic Games
Silver medal – second place	1968 Mexico City	80 m hurdles
Bronze medal – third place	1964 Tokyo	80 m hurdles
British Empire and Commonwealth Games
Gold medal – first place	1962 Perth	80 m hurdles
Gold medal – first place	1962 Perth	Long jump
Gold medal – first place	1966 Kingston	80 m hurdles
Gold medal – first place	1966 Kingston	4 × 110 yd relay
Gold medal – first place	1970 Edinburgh	100 m hurdles
Gold medal – first place	1970 Edinburgh	4 × 100 m relay
- Updated on 13 September 2015

Pamela Kilborn, née Pamela Ryan, AM, MBE (12 August 1939) is an Australian former athlete who set world records as a hurdler. For three years, she was ranked as the world's top woman hurdler.

Kilborn was also an Olympic class sprinter, Long Jumper and pentathlete, and loved shot put, she also won a total of 17 individual Australian Championships between 1962 and 1972.

== Career ==
=== Early career ===
Kilborn was born on 12 August 1939 in Melbourne. She began competing in athletics there during the late 1950s. She competed for the University High School team, under coach Henri Schubert alongside her good friend Judy Amoore (later Pollock).

In 1960 she attempted to gain selection for the 1960 Summer Olympics but could only place third in the Australian Championships with only the first two athletes chosen. She was reputedly so ill during these Championships that she had to be assisted on the medal dais.

During 1961 her performances at both hurdles and long jump had improved substantially and she was ranked No. 4 and No. 10 in the world, respectively, at the end of the year.

=== International career ===
At the 1962 British Empire and Commonwealth Games in Perth, Western Australia, Kilborn became one of the stars of the Games, upsetting world-record holder Betty Moore in the 80 m hurdles race before winning the long jump contest ahead of two countrywomen Helen Frith (silver) and Janet Knee (bronze).

Two years later, at the Summer Olympics in Tokyo, she won the bronze medal behind Karin Balzer (gold) and Teresa Ciepły (silver) after having equalled the Olympic record in the semi-final.

Soon after the Games, on 5 October 1964, she equalled the World Record for 80 m Hurdles, running 10.5 in Tokyo. On 6 February 1965 in Melbourne, she bettered her record with a 10.4 time.

At the 1966 Commonwealth Games in Kingston, Jamaica she won gold medals in 80 m hurdles and 4×110 yards relay.

In 1967 she broke Christine Perera's unofficial 100 m hurdles world record of 13.7 seconds and improved it twice up to 13.3 seconds in 1969.

Having been undefeated since the 1964 Olympics, Kilborn was the favourite for the 1968 Summer Olympics in Mexico City. At the Games she was hampered by a shoulder injury and could not overcome her surprising teenage countrywoman Maureen Caird in the rain-affected final. She won silver in the 80 metre hurdles.

In 1970 the international hurdling distance was extended to 100 metres and, competing at the British Commonwealth Games, she beat Caird to take yet another gold medal. Her three successive golds was the most ever won by any athlete at the Commonwealth Games. Earlier in the Games she was chosen to carry the Australian standard in the Opening Ceremony; the first time a woman had been awarded this honour.

After a brief retirement, she returned to the track and won the British 200 and 200 metres hurdles WAAA Championships titles at the 1972 WAAA Championships and then had one last Olympic campaign in 1972. She set a World Record of 12.5 (12.93 automatic timing) shortly before the 1972 Olympics in Munich, but could only run fourth in the Olympic final.

== Honours ==
Kilborn was made a Member of the Order of the British Empire (MBE) in the 1971 New Year Honours for services in sporting and international spheres, and a Member of the Order of Australia (AM) in 2008. She was inducted into the Sport Australia Hall of Fame in 1985 and received a Centenary Medal in 2001.

== Statistics ==
National Records
Kilborn set multiple Australian records in seven different events during her career: 80 metre hurdles, 100 metres hurdles, 200 metres hurdles, Long Jump, Pentathlon, 4 × 200 metres relay, and 4 × 220 yards relay.

World Records

Over 80 metres hurdles, Kilborn set two official world records in 1964 and 1965.

In the 100 metres hurdles, she set one official world record at Warsaw on 28 June 1972.

At 200 m hurdles, Kilborn-Ryan set four official world records between 1969 and 1971, with a best of 25.7.

In team events, she set a world record for 4 × 220 yards relay of 1:35.8 in Brisbane on 9 November 1969, teaming with Raelene Boyle, Jenny Lamy and Marion Hoffman.

Personal Bests

Event	Time	Wind	Place	Date
100 m	11.50	+0.6	Mexico City, Mexico	14 October 1968
80 m Hurdles	10.4	–	Melbourne	6 February 1965
100 m Hurdles	12.5	+0.9	Warsaw, Poland	28 June 1972
200 m Hurdles	25.7	–	Melbourne	25 November 1971
Long Jump	6.24m	–	Melbourne	21 May 1966

World Rankings – Hurdles and Long Jump

Year	Event	Ranking
1961	80 m Hurdles	4
	Long Jump	10
1962	80 m Hurdles	2
	Long Jump	9
1963	80 m Hurdles	1
1964	80 m Hurdles	3
1965	80 m Hurdles	1
1966	80 m Hurdles	1
1967	80 m Hurdles	1
1968	80 m Hurdles	2
1969	80 m Hurdles	2
1970	100 m Hurdles	4
1972	100 m Hurdles	4

Australian Championships Record – prior to 1963 Championships were held every two years

Year	100 yds/metres	80 m Hurdles	100 m Hurdles	200 m Hurdles	Long Jump	Pentathlon
1960	–	3	–	–	–	–
1962	DNQ	5	–	–	1	–
1963	6	1	–	–	1	1
1964	6	1	–	–	1	–
1965	2	1	–	–	3	–
1966	6	1	–	–	2	–
1967	4	1	–	–	1	1
1968	2	1	1	–	2	1
1969	4	1	1	–	2	–
1970	5	–	2	2	–	–
1971	–	–	–	–	–	–
1972	5	2	1	–	–	–

Records
Preceded by Karin Balzer	Women's 100 m Hurdles World Record Holder; 28 June 1972 – 13 August 1972	Succeeded by Annelie Ehrhardt
