= Carmen Williams =

American obstetrician-gynecologist and reproductive biologist

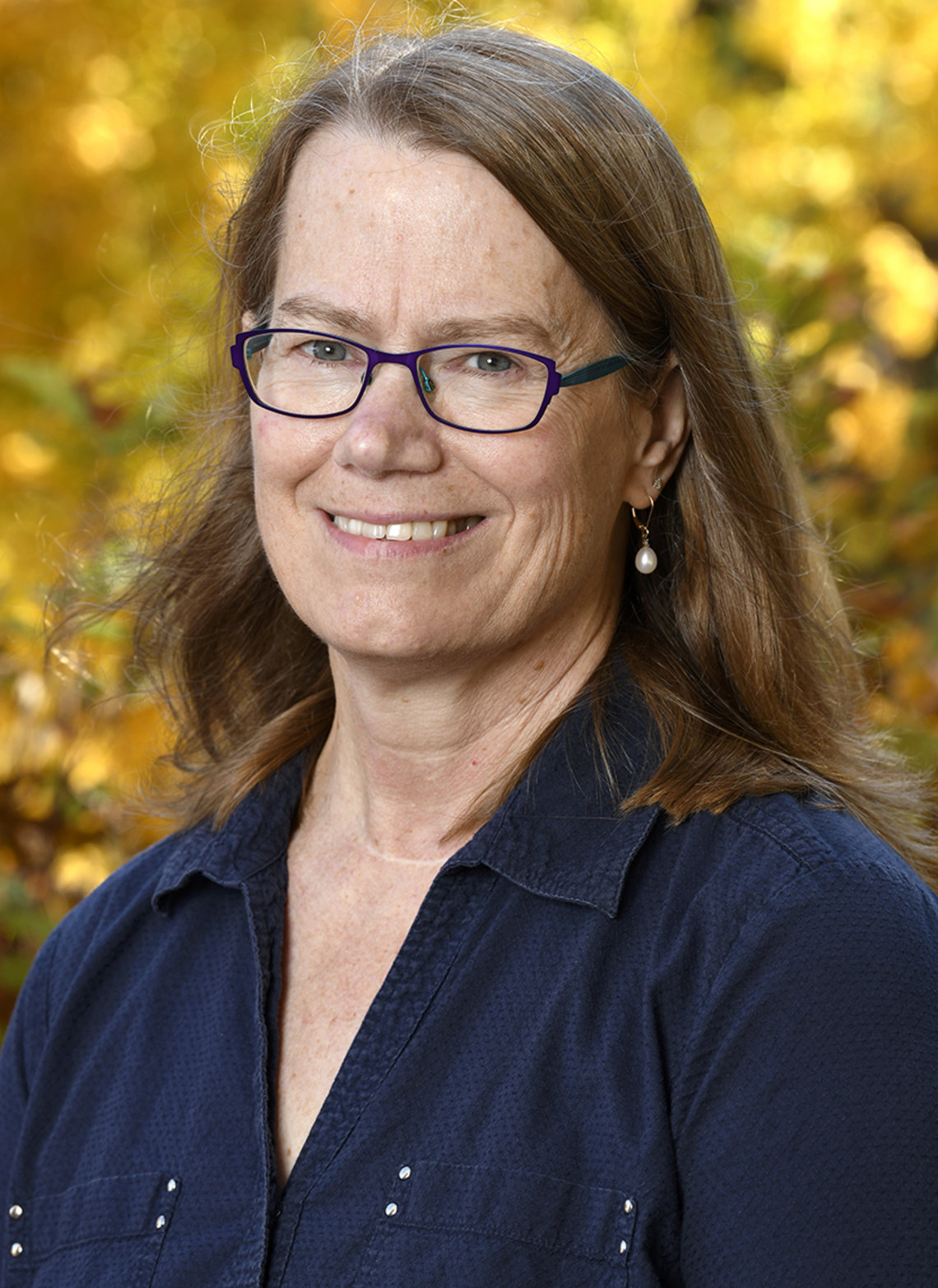
- Williams in 2021
- Education: Duke University
- Scientific career
- Fields: Reproductive developmental biology
- Workplaces: University of Pennsylvania; National Institute of Environmental Health Sciences

Carmen J. Williams is an American obstetrician-gynecologist and reproductive biologist. She has served as the deputy chief of the Reproductive Developmental Biology Laboratory at the National Institute of Environmental Health Sciences since 2017.

== Life ==
Williams earned a B.S.E., magna cum laude, in electrical engineering from Duke University in 1981. From 1981 to 1982, she was an engineer in the Computer Graphics Design Division at the IBM in Poughkeepsie, New York. She completed an M.D. from the Duke University School of Medicine in 1986. She conducted a residency in obstetrics and gynecology at the Pennsylvania Hospital from 1986 to 1990. Williams completed a clinical fellowship in reproductive endocrinology and infertility at the University of Pennsylvania from 1990 to 1992. She earned a Ph.D. in molecular and cell biology from the University of Pennsylvania in 1997. From 1997 to 2000, she was a postdoctoral fellow in the Department of Biology under Richard M. Schultz at the University of Pennsylvania.

From 2000 to 2007, Williams was an assistant professor in the Division of Reproductive Endocrinology and Infertility in the Department of Obstetrics and Gynecology at the University of Pennsylvania. In 2007, she became a tenure-track clinical investigator in the Reproductive Medicine Group in the Reproductive Developmental Biology Laboratory at the National Institute of Environmental Health Sciences. She was promoted to senior investigator in 2016 and deputy chief of the laboratory the following year. The focus of Williams' research is on the basic reproductive biology of embryo development and how the environment impacts reproduction. Among her most important research accomplishments is the discovery of mechanisms that control how well calcium signaling works in very early embryos just after fertilization. In 2022, Williams was elected a fellow of the American Association for the Advancement of Science. Her current research endeavors include exploring and elucidating the role of epigenetics in the reproductive consequences of neonatal exposure to xenoestrogens.
