= Robyn Woodhouse =

Australian high jumper (1943–2026)

Personal information
- Born: 26 July 1943 New South Wales, Australia
- Died: 29 April 2026 (aged 82) Wollongong, New South Wales, Australia
Medal record
Women's Athletics
Representing Australia
British Empire and Commonwealth Games
| Gold medal – first place | 1962 Perth | High Jump |
| Bronze medal – third place | 1966 Kingston | High Jump |

Robyn Woodhouse (26 July 1943 – 29 April 2026) was an Australian track and field athlete, who mainly competed in the high jump event during her career. She represented her native country at the 1964 Summer Olympics, and won the gold medal in high jump at the 1962 British Empire and Commonwealth Games in Perth, Western Australia.

Woodhouse was born in New South Wales on 26 July 1943, and died in Wollongong on 29 April 2026, at the age of 82.
