= Nigeria at the Commonwealth Games =

- CG code: NGR
- CGA: Nigeria Olympic Committee
- Website: nigeriaolympic.org
- Medals Ranked 9th: Gold 70 Silver 75 Bronze 91 Total 236

Commonwealth Games appearances (overview)
- 1950; 1954; 1958; 1962; 1966; 1970; 1974; 1978; 1982; 1986; 1990; 1994; 1998; 2002; 2006; 2010; 2014; 2018; 2022; 2026; 2030

Nigeria has competed at fourteen Commonwealth Games, from 1950. Nigeria did not attend four Games, in 1962, 1978 (in protest at New Zealand's sporting policies towards South Africa during apartheid), 1986 and 1998 (due to suspension).

Nigeria has won at least one medal at every Games attended, including a high of thirty-seven in 1994. The first medal in 1950 was won by Joshua Majekodunmi in the High Jump.

== Medals ==
| Games | Gold | Silver | Bronze | Total |
|---|---|---|---|---|
| 1950 Auckland | 0 | 1 | 0 | 1 |
| 1954 Vancouver | 1 | 3 | 3 | 7 |
| 1958 Cardiff | 0 | 1 | 1 | 2 |
| 1962 Perth | did not attend | | | |
| 1966 Kingston | 3 | 4 | 3 | 10 |
| 1970 Edinburgh | 2 | 0 | 0 | 2 |
| 1974 Christchurch | 3 | 3 | 4 | 10 |
| 1978 Edmonton | did not attend | | | |
| 1982 Brisbane | 5 | 0 | 8 | 13 |
| 1986 Edinburgh | did not attend | | | |
| 1990 Auckland | 5 | 13 | 7 | 25 |
| 1994 Victoria | 11 | 13 | 13 | 37 |
| 1998 Kuala Lumpur | did not attend (suspended) | | | |
| 2002 Manchester | 5 | 3 | 11 | 19 |
| 2006 Melbourne | 4 | 6 | 7 | 17 |
| 2010 Delhi | 11 | 8 | 14 | 33 |
| 2014 Glasgow | 11 | 11 | 14 | 36 |
| 2018 Gold Coast | 9 | 9 | 6 | 24 |
| 2022 Birmingham | 12 | 8 | 14 | 34 |
| Total | 82 | 83 | 105 | 270 |
