= Kenya at the Commonwealth Games =

- CG code: KEN
- CGA: National Olympic Committee of Kenya
- Medals Ranked 8th: Gold 85 Silver 75 Bronze 74 Total 234

Commonwealth Games appearances (overview)
- 1954; 1958; 1962; 1966; 1970; 1974; 1978; 1982; 1986; 1990; 1994; 1998; 2002; 2006; 2010; 2014; 2018; 2022; 2026; 2030

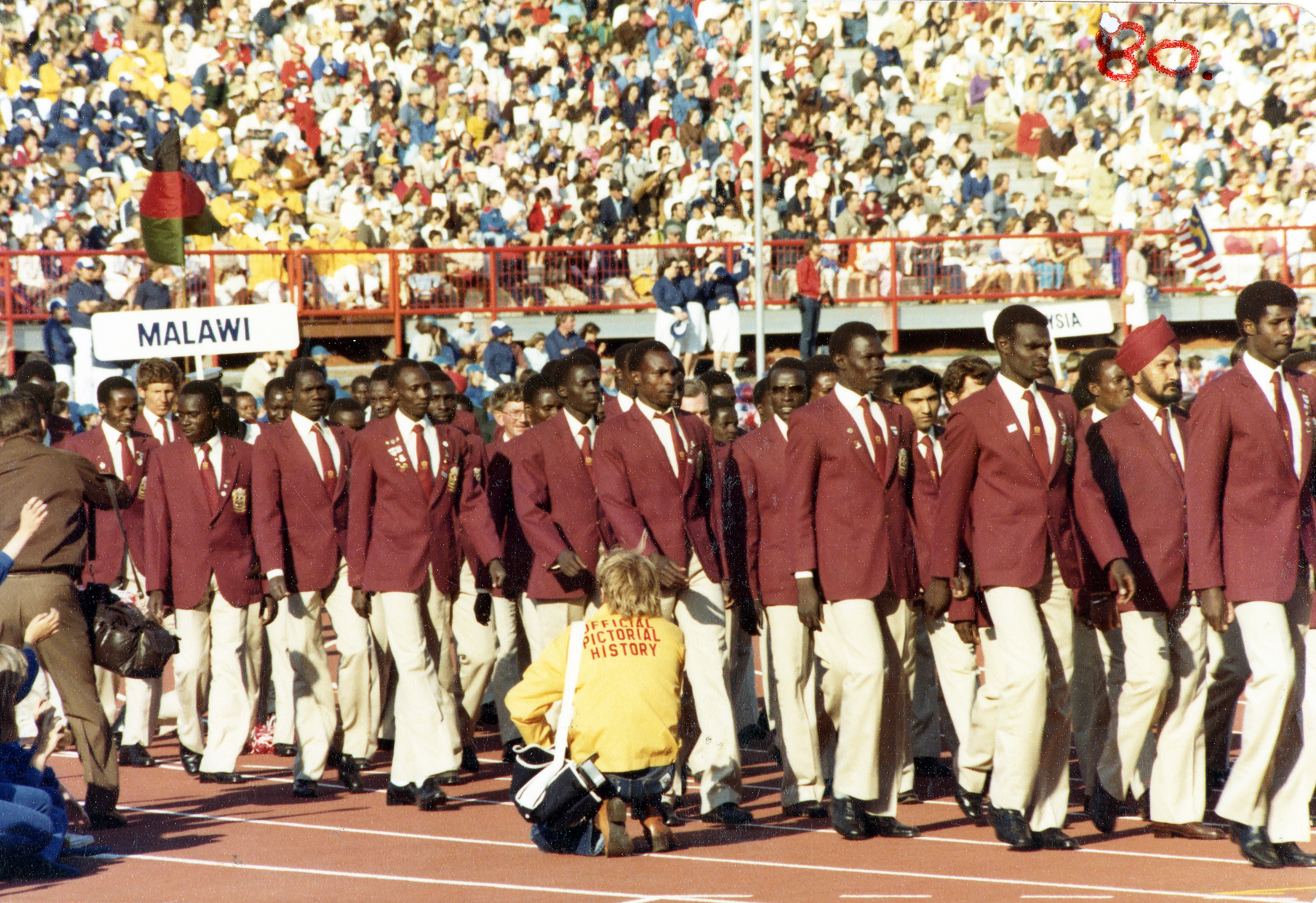
The Kenyan team at the opening ceremony in Brisbane, 1982

Kenya has attended seventeen Commonwealth Games, beginning in 1954 and missing only the 1986 Games. Kenya has won 258 Commonwealth Games medals, mostly in athletics and boxing, with thirty-four coming from a single event, the 3000 metre steeplechase, an event in which no athlete but a Kenyan won a medal between 1994 and 2022.

== Medals ==
| Games | Gold | Silver | Bronze | Total |
|---|---|---|---|---|
| 1954 Vancouver | 0 | 0 | 0 | 0 |
| 1958 Cardiff | 0 | 0 | 2 | 2 |
| 1962 Perth | 2 | 2 | 1 | 5 |
| 1966 Kingston | 4 | 1 | 3 | 8 |
| 1970 Edinburgh | 5 | 3 | 6 | 14 |
| 1974 Christchurch | 7 | 2 | 9 | 18 |
| 1978 Edmonton | 7 | 6 | 5 | 18 |
| 1982 Brisbane | 4 | 2 | 4 | 10 |
| 1986 Edinburgh | did not attend | | | |
| 1990 Auckland | 6 | 9 | 3 | 18 |
| 1994 Victoria | 7 | 4 | 5 | 16 |
| 1998 Kuala Lumpur | 7 | 5 | 4 | 16 |
| 2002 Manchester | 4 | 8 | 4 | 16 |
| 2006 Melbourne | 6 | 5 | 7 | 18 |
| 2010 Delhi | 12 | 11 | 10 | 33 |
| 2014 Glasgow | 10 | 10 | 5 | 25 |
| 2018 Gold Coast | 4 | 7 | 6 | 17 |
| 2022 Birmingham | 6 | 5 | 10 | 21 |
| Total | 91 | 81 | 84 | 255 |
