= Janette Neil =

Scottish athlete

Personal information
- Nationality: British (Scottish)
- Born: 1941
- Died: 2010

Sport
- Sport: Athletics
- Event: Sprints / Long jump
- Club: Mitcham AC

Janette Neil married name Towl (1941 – 2010) was a track and field athlete from Scotland who competed at the 1962 British Empire and Commonwealth Games (now Commonwealth Games).

== Biography ==
Neil was a member of the Mitcham AC and in 1961 was an insurance clerk living at West Barnes Avenue in Mitcham, London.

She won the 1961 Scottish 220 yards AAA Championship title. and represented the Scottish Empire and Commonwealth Games team at the 1962 British Empire Games in Perth, Australia, participating in two events, the 100 yards and the long jump.

In 1963 she married Tony Towl of the Herne Hill Harriers and returned to action for the 1964 season under her married name, following the birth of a son. She missed another season in 1965 because of a giving birth to a second son.
