= Glenys Beasley =

Australian sprinter (born 1944)

Personal information
- Full name: Glenys Anne Nall
- Nationality: Australian
- Born: Glenys Anne Beasley; 12 February 1944 (age 82) Victoria, Australia

Sport
- Sport: Track and field
Medal record
Representing Australia
British Empire and Commonwealth Games
Gold medal – first place	1962 Perth	4 × 110 yards relay

Glenys Anne Nall (née Beasley; born 12 February 1944) is a retired Australian sprinter. During the 1962 British Empire and Commonwealth Games in Perth, she won a gold medal in the 4 × 110 yards relay, and also competed in the 100 yards event. She was also the Australian national champion in the women's 100 yards in 1962.

Born in Victoria, Beasley attended Camberwell High School from 1958 to 1961.
