= Joan Hendry =

Canadian athlete (born 1945)

Joan Hendry (born 14 May 1945) is a Canadian athlete. She was a member of the Canadian 1968 Olympic and 1970 Commonwealth Games team. She also qualified for the 1972 Olympics but could not compete as she was injured. She won two Commonwealth Games bronze medals in long jump and the 4x100 relay and was the only member of Canadian team to win two medals. She was the Canadian long jump champion in 1968, and the silver medallist in 1964, 1967 and 1969, and the bronze medallist in 1966. Hendry was born in Glasgow, Scotland.

She won two silver medals and two bronze medals at the Canadian Championships in the 100 metre run. She was the first Canadian woman to jump over 6 metres in the long jump.

Hendry later became an elementary school teacher and amateur track and field coach in Ottawa. She retired from teaching in 1999.

In May 2009, she was inducted into the Ottawa Sports Hall of Fame.
