= Avis McIntosh =

New Zealand hurdler (1938–2025)

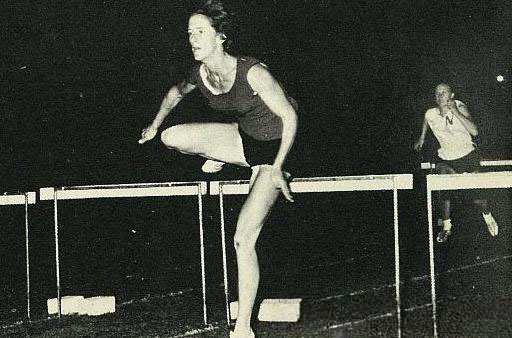
- McIntosh well ahead in the 80 metre hurdles

Personal information
- Born: Avis Helen Brain; 19 May 1938
- Died: 6 April 2025 (aged 86)
- Occupation: Farmer
- Height: 1.66 m (5 ft 5 in)
- Weight: 57 kg (126 lb)

Sport
- Country: New Zealand
- Sport: Athletics
- Events: Hurdles; sprint; long jump
- Club: Lynndale Amateur Athletic and Harrier Club

Achievements and titles
- National finals: 80 m hurdles champion (1958, 1959, 1960, 1961, 1962, 1963, 1964, 1965); 100 yd champion (1963); Long jump champion (1966)
- Personal bests: 100 yd – 10.8 (1961); 80 yd hurdles – 10.88 (1962)
Medal record
Women's athletics
Representing New Zealand
British Empire and Commonwealth Games
Bronze medal – third place	1962 Perth	80 m hurdles
Bronze medal – third place	1962 Perth	4 x 110 yards relay

Avis Helen Fletcher (formerly McIntosh, née Brain; 19 May 1938 – 6 April 2025) was a New Zealand hurdler and sprinter.

== Biography ==
Brain joined Lynndale Amateur Athletic and Harrier Club in the children's division in the 12- to 13-year-old age group. She also ran for Glen Eden, Waitemata and Owairaka Athletic Club. At Avondale College in 1953, she won the 100 yards senior girls when she was 14. From 1954 to 1956 Brain won the Auckland Championship two-and-a-half-mile cross country and the Hamilton road race.

After winning her first New Zealand title in 1958, and not being selected for Cardiff's British Empire and Commonwealth Games, McIntosh was chosen to represent New Zealand from 1959 to 1965. In 1962, McIntosh was selected for the 7th British Empire and Commonwealth Games at Perth. She competed in the 80 m hurdles and relay. McIntosh was first in the 80 m hurdles heat, beating the world record holder in 10.8 sec, the new Games record. At the 1962 British Empire and Commonwealth Games she won the bronze medal in the women's 80 m hurdles. She also won a bronze medal as part of the women's 4 x 110 yards relay team. Her teammates in the relay were Nola Bond, Yvonne Cowan and Doreen Porter. An interesting tale is that Murray Halberg lost her medal in the toilets and had to be told to go back and find it.

On 18 March 1964 at the Lovelock track in Auckland, McIntosh won the 80 m hurdles in 10.7 sec. It was the fastest time ever by a New Zealand women's athlete.

At the 1964 Tokyo Olympics, McIntosh was third in the 80 m hurdles heat in 10.8 sec. She was fifth in the semi-final in 10.9 sec and 10th fastest overall. In the 100 yards, McIntosh was fourth in her heat and sixth in the quarter final.

An all-round athlete, her skills ranged from hurdling, running, jumping, cross-country and pentathlon. She won 24 Auckland titles including 10 straight in the 80 m hurdles from 1956 to 1965. She also won the long jump five times, pentathlon three times and high jump, 75 yards and 100 yards once each.

When she was 40, McIntosh competed in the World Veteran Games and won the 80 m hurdles and was second in the 100 yards. McIntosh has records for long jump, high jump, 100 metres, hammer, and discus all achieved at 50 years of age. She then went on to get the records for discus, high jump, hammer, javelin and long jump at 60 years old!

In 2009, then named Avis Fletcher, she was honoured again in a ceremony to recognise New Zealand's Olympians. She was married to Matty with three children and she had run three farms.

Fletcher died on 6 April 2025, at the age of 86.
