= Margaret Burvill =

Australian sprinter (1941–2009)

Margaret Ann Burvill (2 October 1941 – 28 February 2009) was an athlete who twice set world 220 yard (201.17 m) running records, both at Perry Lakes Stadium in her home town of Perth, Western Australia.

The first was at the Australian National Athletics Championships on 12 January 1963 in a time of 23.2 seconds the second was during the Western Australian Athletics titles on 22 February 1964 in 22.9 seconds. In 1967 she married Olympic hopeful sculler Ian Edwards.
