= Jenny Meldrum =

Jenny Wingerson
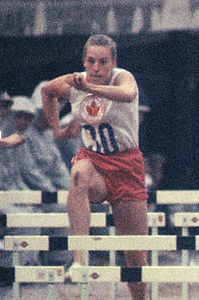
- Jenny Meldrum at the 1964 Olympics

Personal information
- Born: 12 April 1943 (age 83) Northampton, England
- Height: 1.78 m (5 ft 10 in)
- Weight: 68 kg (150 lb)

Sport
- Sport: Athletics
- Event(s): Hurdles, pentathlon

Achievements and titles
- Personal best(s): 80 mH – 10.8 (1964); Pentathlon – 4774 (1968)
Medal record
Representing Canada
Pan American Games
Silver medal – second place	1963 São Paulo	80 m hurdles
Silver medal – second place	1967 Winnipeg	Pentathlon
Silver medal – second place	1967 Winnipeg	4×100 m relay
British Empire and Commonwealth Games
Bronze medal – third place	1966 Kingston	80 m Hurdles
Bronze medal – third place	1970 Edinburgh	Pentathlon

Jennifer Anne "Jenny" Meldrum (née Wingerson on 12 April 1943) is a retired hurdler, shotputter, long jumper and pentathlete from England, who represented Canada at the 1964 and 1968 Olympics in the 80 metre hurdles and pentathlon. She won a silver medal at the 1963 Pan American Games and a bronze at the 1966 Commonwealth Games in the 80 m hurdles. She won two more silver medals at the 1967 Pan American Games in the pentathlon and 4×100 metre relay. At the 1970 Commonwealth Games Meldrum won a bronze in the pentathlon. Jenny Meldrum's son, Greg Meldrum, played for the Canadian Men's National Basketball team in the early 2000s.
