= Helen Frith =

Australian athlete (born 1939)

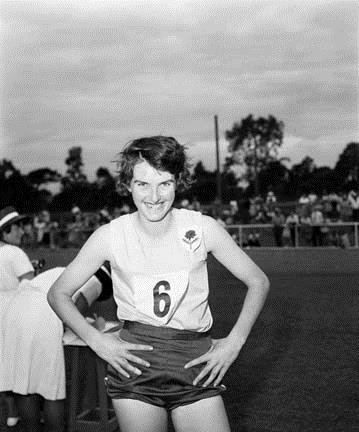

Personal information
- Born: Helen Audrey Ray Frith; 12 July 1939 (age 87) Roseville, New South Wales, Australia
Medal record
Women's Athletics
Representing Australia
British Empire and Commonwealth Games
Bronze medal – third place	1958 Cardiff	High Jump
Silver medal – second place	1962 Perth	Long Jump
Silver medal – second place	1962 Perth	High Jump

Helen Audrey Ray Frith (born 12 July 1939) is an Australian athlete. She competed in the 1960 and 1964 Olympics, representing her native country in the long jump, high jump and pentathlon. She won silver medals at the 1962 British Empire and Commonwealth Games in both the long jump and high jump and a bronze medal in the high jump at 1958 British Empire and Commonwealth Games.

She was born in Roseville, New South Wales, the daughter of masters athletics legend Ruth Frith, who also coached her. She joined her mother in masters competition, under her married name Helen Searle she holds masters W60 world records in the hammer throw and throws pentathlon.

Frith was the 1960 Australian champion in the high jump, the 1964 and 1966 champion in the long jump, and five-time champion in the pentathlon, 1960, 1962, 1964–6.
