= Carmen Smith-Brown =

Jamaican sprinter (born 1943)

Personal information
- Born: 16 February 1943 (age 83) Saint Catherine Parish, Colony of Jamaica, British Empire
- Height: 1.60 m (5 ft 3 in)
- Weight: 54 kg (119 lb)

Sport
- Sport: Sprinting
- Events: 100 metres, 80 metres hurdles
Medal record
Women's Athletics
Representing Jamaica
Central American and Caribbean Games
Gold medal – first place	1962 Kingston	4x100 m relay
Gold medal – first place	1966 San Juan	80 m hurdles
Gold medal – first place	1966 San Juan	4x100 m relay
Bronze medal – third place	1962 Kingston	80 m hurdles
Bronze medal – third place	1966 San Juan	100 metres

Carmen Smith-Brown (born 16 February 1943) is a Jamaican sprinter. She competed in the 100 metres at the 1964 Summer Olympics and the 1968 Summer Olympics.

== International competitions ==
Year	Competition	Venue	Position	Event	Notes
Representing Jamaica
1962	Central American and Caribbean Games	Kingston, Jamaica	5th	100 m	12.2
1962	Central American and Caribbean Games	Kingston, Jamaica	3rd	80 m hurdles	11.8
1962	Central American and Caribbean Games	Kingston, Jamaica	1st	4 × 100 m relay	47.0
1962	British Empire and Commonwealth Games	Perth, Australia	12th (h)	100 y	11.4
1962	British Empire and Commonwealth Games	Perth, Australia	16th (h)	220 y	25.9
1962	British Empire and Commonwealth Games	Perth, Australia	–	80 m hurdles	DNF
1962	British Empire and Commonwealth Games	Perth, Australia	4th	4 × 110 y relay	48.6
1964	British West Indies Championships	Kingston, Jamaica	1st	100 m	11.8
1964	British West Indies Championships	Kingston, Jamaica	3rd	200 m	24.5
1964	British West Indies Championships	Kingston, Jamaica	1st	80 m hurdles	11.4
1964	Olympic Games	Tokyo, Japan	16th (sf)	100 m	11.9
1964	Olympic Games	Tokyo, Japan	24th (h)	80 m hurdles	11.8
1964	Olympic Games	Tokyo, Japan	8th (h)	4 × 100 m relay	46.0
1965	British West Indies Championships	Bridgetown, Barbados	1st	100 m	11.9
1965	British West Indies Championships	Bridgetown, Barbados	2nd	80 m hurdles	11.5
1966	Central American and Caribbean Games	San Juan, Puerto Rico	3rd	100 m	11.86
1966	Central American and Caribbean Games	San Juan, Puerto Rico	1st	80 m hurdles	11.1
1966	Central American and Caribbean Games	San Juan, Puerto Rico	1st	4 × 100 m relay	46.2
1966	British Empire and Commonwealth Games	Kingston, Jamaica	12th (h)	100 y	11.0
1966	British Empire and Commonwealth Games	Kingston, Jamaica	2nd	80 m hurdles	11.0
1966	British Empire and Commonwealth Games	Kingston, Jamaica	3rd	4 × 110 y relay	45.6
1968	Olympic Games	Mexico City, Mexico	34th (h)	100 m	11.9
1968	Olympic Games	Mexico City, Mexico	20th (h)	80 m hurdles	11.0
1968	Olympic Games	Mexico City, Mexico	–	4 × 100 m relay	DQ
1970	British Commonwealth Games	Edinburgh, United Kingdom	16th (sf)	100 m	12.06 (w)
1970	British Commonwealth Games	Edinburgh, United Kingdom	7th	100 m hurdles	14.44
1970	British Commonwealth Games	Edinburgh, United Kingdom	5th	4 × 100 m relay	45.5
1971	Central American and Caribbean Championships	Kingston, Jamaica	3rd	100 m hurdles	14.1
1975	Pan American Games	Mexico City, Mexico	5th	100 m hurdles	14.08

== Personal bests ==
- 100 metres – 11.6 (1964)
- 80 metres hurdles – 11.09 (1968)
