= Adlin Mair-Clarke =

Jamaican sprinter and hurdler (1941–2020)

Personal information
- Full name: Adlin Victoria Mair-Clarke
- Born: Adlin Victoria Mair; 15 November 1941 Kingston, Colony of Jamaica, British Empire
- Died: 6 April 2020 (aged 78) New York City, United States
- Height: 5 ft 5 in (165 cm)

Sport
- Country: Jamaica
- Sport: Athletics
- Events: Hurdling, sprint

Achievements and titles
- Personal best: 100 m – 11.7 (1966)
Medal record
Women's athletics
Representing Jamaica
British Empire and Commonwealth Games
Bronze medal – third place	1966 Kingston	4 x 110 yards relay
Central American and Caribbean Games
Gold medal – first place	1966 San Juan	4 × 100 metres relay

Adlin Mair-Clarke (15 November 1941 – 6 April 2020) was an athlete from Jamaica specializing in hurdles and sprinting. She was born Adlin Victoria Mair in Manchester Parish, Jamaica. Mair-Clarke participated in the British Empire & Commonwealth Games in 1962, 1966 and 1970 as well as the Olympic Games in 1964 and 1968.

== International competitions ==
Year	Competition	Venue	Position	Event	Notes
Representing Jamaica
1962	Central American and Caribbean Games	Kingston, Jamaica	6th	100 m	12.4
1962	Central American and Caribbean Games	Kingston, Jamaica	5th	80 m hurdles	11.9
1962	British Empire and Commonwealth Games	Perth, Australia	19th (h)	100 y	11.7
1962	British Empire and Commonwealth Games	Perth, Australia	19th (h)	220 y	26.5
1962	British Empire and Commonwealth Games	Perth, Australia	10th (h)	80 m hurdles	12.1
1962	British Empire and Commonwealth Games	Perth, Australia	5th	4 × 110 y relay	48.6
1964	British West Indies Championships	Kingston, Jamaica	2nd	100 m	11.9
1964	British West Indies Championships	Kingston, Jamaica	2nd	200 m	24.5
1964	British West Indies Championships	Kingston, Jamaica	2nd	80 m hurdles	11.4
1964	Olympic Games	Tokyo, Japan	21st (h)	200 m	25.0
1964	Olympic Games	Tokyo, Japan	8th (h)	4 × 100 m relay	46.0
1965	British West Indies Championships	Bridgetown, Barbados	2nd	100 m	12.0
1965	British West Indies Championships	Bridgetown, Barbados	3rd	80 m hurdles	11.6
1966	Central American and Caribbean Games	San Juan, Puerto Rico	3rd (sf)	100 m	11.7^{1}
1966	Central American and Caribbean Games	San Juan, Puerto Rico	1st	4 × 100 m relay	46.2
1966	British Empire and Commonwealth Games	Kingston, Jamaica	7th	100 y	10.9
1966	British Empire and Commonwealth Games	Kingston, Jamaica	3rd	4 × 110 y relay	45.6
1968	Olympic Games	Mexico City, Mexico	–	4 × 100 m relay	DQ
1970	Central American and Caribbean Games	Panama City, Panama	4th	100 m	12.0 (w)
1970	Central American and Caribbean Games	Panama City, Panama	6th (h)	200 m	25.0
1970	British Commonwealth Games	Edinburgh, United Kingdom	15th (sf)	100 m	11.99 (w)
1970	British Commonwealth Games	Edinburgh, United Kingdom	15th (h)	200 m	24.7
1970	British Commonwealth Games	Edinburgh, United Kingdom	5th	4 × 100 m relay	45.5

^{1}Did not start in the final
