= Michele Brown (high jumper) =

Australian athlete (born 1939)

Personal information
- Full name: Michele Mary Brown
- Born: 3 July 1939 (age 87)
Medal record
Women's athletics
Representing Australia
Olympic Games
Silver medal – second place	1964 Tokyo	High Jump
Commonwealth Games
Gold medal – first place	1958 Cardiff	High Jump
Gold medal – first place	1966 Kingston	High Jump
Bronze medal – third place	1962 Perth	High jump

Michele Mary Brown (née Mason; born 3 July 1939) is an Australian athlete, who competed mainly in the high jump during her career.

She competed for Australia at the 1964 Summer Olympics held in Tokyo, Japan where she won the silver medal in the women's high jump event. She was the second female athlete ever to jump over six feet, after Iolanda Balaș.

Brown was inducted into the Athletics Australia Hall of Fame in 2010.
