= Violet Odogwu =

Nigerian track and field athlete

Personal information
- Born: May 15, 1942 (age 84) Asaba, Nigeria

Sport
- Country: Nigeria
- Sport: Track and Field

Violet Obiamaka Odogwu-Nwajei (born May 15, 1942) is a former Nigerian track and field athlete. She is a former president of the Athletic Federation of Nigeria and a vice-president of the Confederation of African Athletics.

== Life ==
Odogwu was born in Asaba, Delta State. She started her education in the city before moving to Lagos, where she completed her secondary education.

In the 1950s, Violet and her sister Juliet ran for the Ladies Sports Club. In 1958, she represented Nigeria at the 1958 Commonwealth Games. Her progressive performance at the event earned her the 'Sports Woman of the Year' award. After the games, she continued with her studies, taking courses in secretarial studies. In 1963, she went back to athletics and represented Nigeria at the first All-African Games in the 80-metre hurdle.

Odogwu was a member of the Nigerian contingent at the 1966 Commonwealth Games in Kingston. At the Kingston Games, she earned a bronze medal by jumping 20 feet, 2 1/2 inches, in the long jump event to become the first female African medalist at the Commonwealth Games.

In 1968, she captained the Nigerian women's athletics team to the 1968 Olympics. She did not win a medal but was a finalist in long jump She was a bronze medalist at the Little Olympics, held a year earlier in preparation for the main event.

== Sources ==
- Amadiume, Ifi (2000). Daughters of the Goddess, Daughters of Imperialism: African Women Struggle for Culture, Power and Democracy. Zed Books.
- Ogunbiyi, Ogungbenjo (1978). The Development of Nigeria's Participation in International Sports Competition and Its Effects on the Nation (Thesis). Ohio State University.
- Oduyale, Amos (1979). TWENTY-FIVE YEARS HISTORY OF OLYMPIC MOVEMENT IN NIGERIA, 1951-1976 (Thesis). OPennsylvania Stale University.
- Ikhazuagbe, Duro (19 April 2011). "Kalkaba, Odogwu Re-Elected to Lead African Athletics". This day. lagos.
- "Profile of Violet Odogwu". Spear Magazine. Lagos: Daily Times. October 1967.
