= Doreen Porter =

New Zealand sprinter (born 1941)

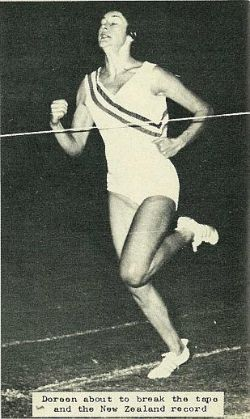
- Porter breaking the tape and the New Zealand record

Personal information
- Born: 21 July 1941 (age 85) Auckland, New Zealand

Sport
- Sport: Athletics
- Event: 100 yards
Medal record
Women's athletics
Representing New Zealand
Commonwealth Games
Silver medal – second place	1962 Perth	100 yards
Bronze medal – third place	1962 Perth	4 x 110 yards relay

Doreen Helen Porter (born 21 July 1941), later Doreen Porter-Shann, is a former sprinter from New Zealand. She won a silver medal in the women's 100 yards and was a member of the bronze medal winning 4 x 100 yards relay team at the 1962 British Empire and Commonwealth Games. In April 1964 Porter set the record for the fastest women's 220 yard race held in the United States. In October of that year she also competed in the Olympic Games in Tokyo.

== Early life ==
Porter was born in Auckland on the 21st of July 1941. While in high school she competed in gymnastics, diving and in 100- and 220-yard races. While a teenager she joined the Western Suburbs Athletic & Harrier Club.

== Sports career ==
In 1961, Porter set the New Zealand resident record for the 100 yard sprint. At the 1962 British Empire and Commonwealth Games she won the silver medal in the women's 100 yards. She also won a bronze medal as part of the women's 4 x 110 yards relay team. Her teammates in the relay were Nola Bond, Yvonne Cowan and Avis McIntosh. In 1963 she was unable to take up an invitation to attend a running meet in Los Angeles with Peter Snell as New Zealand athletics administrators required her to be accompanied by a chaperone. The Auckland Star newspaper then started a fund raising campaign to send her to compete with the New Zealand Amateur Athletics Association agreeing to the trip if her expenses were paid by subscription. The fundraising campaign successfully obtained the necessary funds to send Porter to the United States.

In April 1964, Porter competed in Los Angeles and set the United States record for women for the 220 yard race.

Porter competed in one Olympic Games in Tokyo in 1964 making the quarter-final and semi-final of the 100 and 200 metres respectively.

Porter's competitive running career was halted as a result of injury.

== Later life ==
In 1980, she married and moved with her husband to the United States. She is now an artist.
