= Joyce Bennett =

Australian sprinter (born 1945)

Personal information
- Born: Joyce Bennett; 11 May 1945 (age 81)

Sport
- Country: Australia
Medal record
Men's athletics
Representing Australia
Commonwealth Games
Gold medal – first place	1962 Perth	Women's 4 × 110 yards relay
Gold medal – first place	1966 Kingston	Women's 4 × 110 yards relay

Joyce Bennett (Sala Tenna) (born 11 May 1945 in Guildford, Western Australia) is a former Australian sprinter.

At the 1962 British Empire and Commonwealth Games in Perth she won silver in the 220 Yards and gold in the 4 × 110 yards relay. Four years later at the 1966 British Empire and Commonwealth Games in Kingston she defended her title in the 4 × 110 yards relay.

She participated in the 1964 Summer Olympics (half-final in the 200 m, sixth in the 4 × 100 metres relay) and in the 1968 Summer Olympics (heat in the 400 m, fifth in the 4 × 100 metres relay).
