= Betty R. Moore =

British/Australian athlete (born 1934)

Betty Moore (née McReavie)
Personal information
- Nationality: British/Australian
- Born: 21 November 1934 (age 91) New South Wales, Australia

Sport
- Sport: Athletics
- Event: hurdles
- Club: Salford Harriers
Medal record
Women's Athletics
Representing England
British Empire and Commonwealth Games
Silver medal – second place	1962 Perth	80 metres hurdles
Silver medal – second place	1962 Perth	4×110 yards relay

Betty R. Moore (née McReavie; born 21 November 1934) is an Australian athlete who ran for Great Britain.

== Biography ==
Moore set hurdles records for New South Wales during the 1950s while completing her MSc in chemistry, with Arthur Birch at the University of Sydney. She travelled to Manchester, England and started training with the British athletics team.

Moore finished second behind Carole Quinton in the 80 metres hurdles event at the British 1960 WAAA Championships. Shortly afterwards Moore was selected to represent Great Britain in the 1960 Olympic Games in Rome, but was disqualified from competing because she had resided in Britain for only 22 months instead of the required 24.

Moore became the national 80 metres hurdles champion after winning the British WAAA Championships title at the 1961 WAAA Championships and retained her title one year later at the 1962 WAAA Championships. On 25 August 1962, she set a world record for the 80 metres hurdles, recording a time of 10.5 seconds.

She was duly selected for the England team that travelled to Perth, Western Australia for the 1962 British Empire and Commonwealth Games, where she won two silver medals in the 80 metres hurdles and the 4 x 110 yard relay.

She later returned to Australia to resume her career in chemistry and retired in 1999. Moore was an accredited coach and official and served as a technical official at the 2000 Olympic Games in Sydney, where she also serves as a board member at Athletics New South Wales.

Moore's world record qualified her for inclusion on the Athletic Centre Path of Champions at Sydney Olympic Park Athletics Centre.

CV from NSW Athletics

- Life Member Athletics Australia, Athletics NSW, Ryde Athletics Centre and Salford Harriers (UK)
- 2001: Centenary Award for contribution to Youth
- 2007: Olympic Council Order of Merit
- 2004: NSW Sports Federation Award for Distinguished Service to Athletics
- 1994: Athletics NSW Board member
- NSW Olympic Council member
- Member Executive Committee Girls' Brigade NSW for 16 years
- Committee Member NSW Duke of Edinburgh Award Scheme for five years
- Holds MSc, Grad. Dip. Ch. Studies, MRACI, C. Chem., Reg. Public Analyst.
- 1984–1999: Former Manager of Consulting Analytical Laboratory
- 2001–2003: Project Officer in Intellectual Property Management for CSIRO
- Technical Official 2000 Olympic Games
- NPA to Great Britain Chef de Mission 2000 Paralympic Games.
- Level 4 coach
