= Christiana Boateng =

Ghanaian sprinter

Personal information
- Nationality: Ghanaian
- Born: 24 February 1943

Sport
- Sport: Sprinting
- Event: 100 metres

Christiana Boateng (born 24 February 1943, date of death unknown) was a Ghanaian sprinter. She competed in the women's 100 metres at the 1964 Summer Olympics.
