= Nola Bond =

New Zealand sprinter

Medal record

Women's athletics

Representing New Zealand

Commonwealth Games
Bronze medal – third place	1962 Perth	4 x 110 yards relay

Nola Margaret Bond is a former New Zealand sprinter. At the 1962 British Empire and Commonwealth Games she won the bronze medal in the women's 4 x 110 yards relay. Her teammates in the relay were Yvonne Cowan, Avis McIntosh and Doreen Porter. At the Games she also competed individually in the 100 and 200 metres.
