= Yvonne Cowan =

New Zealand sprinter

Yvonne Gibbons
Personal information
- Born: Molly Yvonne Cowan; 1939 or 1940 (age 86–87)
- Spouse: Kevin Gibbons (m. 1965; died 2026)
- Children: 3
- Relative: Paul Gibbons (son)

Sport
- Country: New Zealand
- Sport: Track and field
- Events: 100 yd; 220 yd
Medal record
Women's athletics
Representing New Zealand
British Empire and Commonwealth Games
Bronze medal – third place	1962 Perth	4 × 110 yards relay

Molly Yvonne Gibbons (née Cowan; born 1939 or 1940) is a former New Zealand sprinter who won a bronze medal at representing her country at the 1962 British Empire and Commonwealth Games in Perth.

== Biography ==
Gibbons was born Molly Yvonne Cowan, the second daughter of Myra Cowan (née Hansen) and Robert Milne Cowan, in 1939 or 1940.

At the 1962 British Empire and Commonwealth Games, Cowan won a bronze medal in the women's 4 × 110 yards relay, alongside Nola Bond, Avis McIntosh and Doreen Porter. At the Games she also competed individually in the 100 and 220 yards, making the semi-finals of the latter.

In 1963, Cowan became engaged to pole vaulter Kevin Gibbons, who also represented New Zealand at the 1962 British Empire and Commonwealth Games. The couple married in 1965 at St Mary's Church, New Plymouth, and went on to have three children. In 1992, their son, Paul Gibbons, became the first New Zealand pole vaulter to compete an Olympic Games. Kevin Gibbons died in New Plymouth in 2026.
