= Ann Packer =

English athlete

Ann Packer MBE
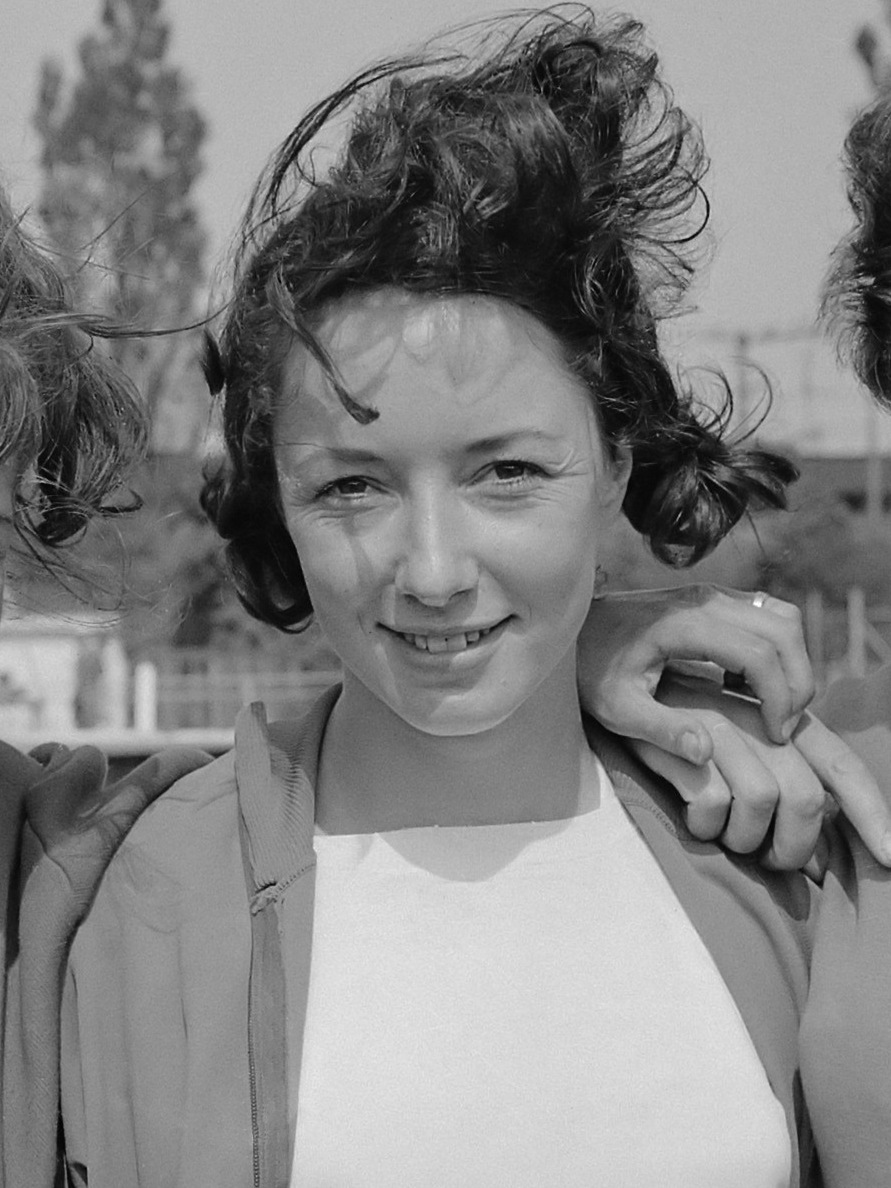
- Packer in 1964

Personal information
- Born: 8 March 1942 (age 84) Moulsford, Oxfordshire, England
- Height: 1.69 m (5 ft 7 in)
- Weight: 57 kg (126 lb)

Sport
- Sport: Athletics
- Events: 200 m, 400 m, 800 m, hurdles, long jump
- Club: Reading Athletic Club

Achievements and titles
- Personal bests: 200 m – 23.8s (1964); 400 m – 52.20 (1964); 800 m – 2:01.1 (1964)
Medal record
Women's athletics
Representing Great Britain
Olympic Games
Gold medal – first place	1964 Tokyo	800 m (WR)
Silver medal – second place	1964 Tokyo	400 m
European Championships
Bronze medal – third place	1962 Belgrade	4 × 100 m relay
Representing England
British Empire and Commonwealth Games
Silver medal – second place	1962 Perth	4 × 110 yd relay

Ann Elizabeth Packer MBE (born 8 March 1942) is an English former sprinter, hurdler and long jumper. She won a gold medal in the 800 metres and a silver in the 400 metres at the 1964 Summer Olympics.

== Biography ==
In 1959 Packer won the English Schools 100 yards title. Next year she competed internationally in the long jump. She attended Didcot Girls' Grammar School (now Didcot Girls' School).

In 1962, she reached the finals in the 200 metres at the European Championships and in the 80 metres hurdles at the Commonwealth Games; she was also part of the 4 × 110 yards relay team that won two medals at these competitions. In 1963 she focused on the 400 metres, and already by her fourth 400 m race ran a world-level time of 53.6 seconds.

Packer became the national 440 yards champion after winning the British WAAA Championships title at the 1964 WAAA Championships.

When she was selected for the 1964 British Olympic team Packer worked as a physical education teacher at Coombe County Girls' School, New Malden, Surrey. At the Olympics she shared a room with long jump gold medallist Mary Rand. Packer was hoping to win the 400 metres, but was beaten into second place by Betty Cuthbert of Australia, despite setting a new European record at 52.20 seconds. Disappointed, Packer planned to skip the 800 m event and have a shopping trip instead, until her fiancé, Robbie Brightwell persuaded her to compete. Before the Olympics, Packer only had five domestic 800 m races; she had taken up a longer distance to improve her stamina, and earned the third British spot at the last minute.

In her heat and semi-final Packer finished fifth and third, running 2:12.6 and 2:06.0 respectively, being beaten by French runner Maryvonne Dupureur, clocking 2:04.5 and 2:04.1. She thus started the final the second slowest of the eight contestants, having raced at the distance only seven times before. Packer was sixth at 400 m, lying behind Dupureur. She began her sprint to the finish with about 150 m to go, moved up to third at 100 m and took the lead in the final straight, using her sprinting speed to take the gold. She broke the world record with a time of 2:01.1 minutes. Commenting on her win, Packer said "Middle-distance running for women was still in its infancy and the 800 m had only been run in Rome four years earlier for the first time. I knew nothing about the event but being so naive was probably to my advantage; it meant I did not have any limitations in my head regarding what I should or could do. Ignorance proved to be bliss." Packer's winning performance is featured in Tokyo Olympiad, the official documentary of the games directed by Kon Ichikawa.

After winning the gold medal, she announced her retirement at the age of 22 and so had one of the shortest athletics careers of any Olympic gold medallist. It would be another forty years before another British woman, Kelly Holmes, would win the 800 m, despite British men being successful at the distance.

Later in the same Games, Robbie Brightwell won a silver medal in the 4 × 400 m relay. They married on 19 December 1964 and had three sons, Gary, a 400 m runner like his mother, and Ian and David, the latter two becoming footballers with Manchester City. She and Brightwell were each appointed Member of the Order of the British Empire (MBE) in the 1965 New Year Honours for services to athletics. In 2011 Brightwell published a book detailing their careers: Robbie Brightwell and his Golden Girl: The Posh and Becks of Yesteryear. Packer now lives in Congleton in Cheshire. She was widowed following Robbie's death in March 2022.

In 2009, Packer was inducted into the England Athletics Hall of Fame. Ann was coached by Denis Watts and was a member of Reading Athletic Club when she was selected for the British Olympic team.

In 1966 Packer appeared in an experiment for the BBC TV history programme, Chronicle to see how far geese could walk in a day. She was chosen because however far the geese went, she would still be with them at the end.

Packer's 800 m gold medal win at the Tokyo 1964 Summer Olympics is dramatically captured in the stunning documentary film Tokyo Olympiad (1965) directed by Kon Ichikawa. The race (and Packer celebrating with friends and loved ones after winning) is shown in its entirety starting at minute 59:30 of the film.

Athletic personal bests: 100 y 10.9 (1963), 10.8w (1960); 100 m 11.7w, 12.0 (1960), 200 m 23.7 (1964), 400 m 52.20 (1964), 800 m 2:01.1 (1964), 80 m h 11.4 (1960), HJ 1.60 (1959), LJ 5.92 (1960), Pen 4294 (old tables) (1963).

== Honours ==
During the celebrations marking 750 years of Congleton's charter in 2022, a postbox in Congleton was painted gold by Royal Mail in Packer's honour.

In 2023 a meeting room at the reopened Congleton leisure centre was named the Brightwell suite in honour of Ann and her late husband Robbie Brightwell.

Records
Preceded by (Australia) Dixie Willis	Women's 800 metres World Record Holder; 1964-10-20 – 1967-06-28	Succeeded by (Australia) Judy Pollock
