= Rose Hart =

Ghanaian athletics competitor

Medal record

Women's Athletics

Representing Ghana

All-Africa Games
Gold medal – first place	1965 Brazzaville	100 m Hurdles
Gold medal – first place	1973 Lagos	Discus Throw

Rose Hart (January 9, 1942 – September 2012) was a female track and field athlete from Ghana. She specialised in the hurdling, the sprints and the discus throw events during her career.

Hart represented Ghana at the 1964 Olympic Games. She twice claimed a gold medal for her native West African country at the All-Africa Games: 1965 and 1973.
