= 1995 European Cup Super League =

These are the full results of the 1995 European Cup Super League in athletics which was held on 24 and 25 June 1995 at the Stadium Lille Métropole in Villeneuve-d'Ascq, France.

== Team standings ==
Men
Pos.	Nation	Points
1	Germany	117
2	Great Britain	107
3	Russia	105
4	Italy	96.5
5	Ukraine	82
6	Sweden	78.5
7	Spain	67
8	Poland	66

Women
Pos.	Nation	Points
1	Russia	117
2	Germany	100
3	Great Britain	85
4	France	75
5	Ukraine	75
6	Belarus	71
7	Italy	52
8	Poland	37

Spain was not relegated from the men's Super League being the host of the next edition.

== Men's results ==
=== 100 metres ===
24 June
Wind: +2.0 m/s

Rank	Name	Nationality	Time	Notes	Points
1	Linford Christie	Great Britain	10.05	CR	8
2	Andrey Grigoryev	Russia	10.27		7
3	Ezio Madonia	Italy	10.27		6
4	Matias Ghansah	Sweden	10.32		5
5	Marc Blume	Germany	10.37		4
6	Jordi Mayoral	Spain	10.46		3
7	Dmytro Vanyaikin	Ukraine	10.48		2
8	Marek Zalewski	Poland	10.64		1

=== 200 metres ===
25 June
Wind: +1.9 m/s

Rank	Name	Nationality	Time	Notes	Points
1	Linford Christie	Great Britain	20.11	CR	8
2	Vladyslav Dolohodin	Ukraine	20.35		7
3	Aleksandr Sokolov	Russia	20.64		6
4	Christian Konieczny	Germany	20.65		5
5	Torbjörn Eriksson	Sweden	20.81		4
6	Krzysztof Sieńko	Poland	20.95		3
7	Francisco Navarro	Spain	21.00		2
8	Andrea Colombo	Italy	21.00		1

=== 400 metres ===
24 June

Rank	Name	Nationality	Time	Notes	Points
1	Mark Richardson	Great Britain	45.43		8
2	Andrea Nuti	Italy	46.40		7
3	Karsten Just	Germany	46.42		6
4	Valentin Kulbatskiy	Ukraine	46.47		5
5	Dmitriy Kosov	Russia	46.84		4
6	Marko Granat	Sweden	47.18		3
7	Paweł Januszewski	Poland	47.44		2
8	Cayetano Cornet	Spain	47.56		1

=== 800 metres ===
25 June

Rank	Name	Nationality	Time	Notes	Points
1	Nico Motchebon	Germany	1:46.75		8
2	Andrzej Jakubiec	Poland	1:47.15		7
3	Andrea Giocondi	Italy	1:47.33		6
4	Andrey Loginov	Russia	1:47.33		5
5	José Manuel Cerezo	Spain	1:47.54		4
6	Torbjörn Johansson	Sweden	1:48.01		3
7	Anatoliy Yakimovich	Ukraine	1:48.76		2
8	Craig Winrow	Great Britain	1:48.84		1

=== 1500 metres ===
24 June

Rank	Name	Nationality	Time	Notes	Points
1	Rüdiger Stenzel	Germany	3:42.58		8
2	Vyacheslav Shabunin	Russia	3:42.59		7
3	Fermín Cacho	Spain	3:44.20		6
4	Gary Lough	Great Britain	3:45.11		5
5	Andrey Bulkovskiy	Ukraine	3:45.87		4
6	Piotr Rostkowski	Poland	3:46.08		3
7	Giuseppe D'Urso	Italy	3:49.46		2
8	Jörgen Zaki	Sweden	3:50.96		1

=== 5000 metres ===
25 June

Rank	Name	Nationality	Time	Notes	Points
1	Gennaro Di Napoli	Italy	13:45.57		8
2	John Nuttall	Great Britain	13:46.82		7
3	Manuel Pancorbo	Spain	13:48.93		6
4	Vener Kashayev	Russia	13:49.69		5
5	Michał Bartoszak	Poland	13:53.57		4
6	Thorsten Naumann	Germany	13:55.91		3
7	Claes Nyberg	Sweden	14:00.66		2
8	Viktor Rogovoy	Ukraine	14:36.67		1

=== 10,000 metres ===
24 June

Rank	Name	Nationality	Time	Notes	Points
1	Stefano Baldini	Italy	28:45.77		8
2	Stephan Freigang	Germany	28:46.34		7
3	Alejandro Gómez	Spain	28:46.76		6
4	Oleg Strizhakov	Russia	29:00.78		5
5	Valeriy Chesak	Ukraine	29:22.07		4
6	Justin Hobbs	Great Britain	29:25.92		3
7	Bjarne Thysell	Sweden	29:48.42		2
8	Piotr Gładki	Poland	30:52.47		1

=== 110 metres hurdles ===
25 June
Wind: +1.0 m/s

Rank	Name	Nationality	Time	Notes	Points
1	Florian Schwarthoff	Germany	13.28		8
2	Andrew Tulloch	Great Britain	13.64		7
3	Dmitriy Kolesnichenko	Ukraine	13.67		6
4	Niklas Eriksson	Sweden	13.69		5
5	Gennadiy Dakshevich	Russia	13.76		4
6	Ronald Mehlich	Poland	13.79		3
7	Miguel de los Santos	Spain	13.92		2
8	Dario Volturara	Italy	14.12		1

=== 400 metres hurdles ===
24 June

Rank	Name	Nationality	Time	Notes	Points
1	Laurent Ottoz	Italy	49.30		8
2	Ruslan Mashchenko	Russia	49.49		7
3	Sven Nylander	Sweden	49.64		6
4	Gary Jennings	Great Britain	50.43		5
5	Gennadiy Gorbenko	Ukraine	50.54		4
6	Michael Kaul	Germany	50.63		3
7	Piotr Kotlarski	Poland	50.84		2
8	Iñigo Monreal	Spain	51.86		1

=== 3000 metres steeplechase ===
25 June

Rank	Name	Nationality	Time	Notes	Points
1	Alessandro Lambruschini	Italy	8:21.94		8
2	Steffen Brand	Germany	8:24.00		7
3	Javier Rodríguez	Spain	8:25.03		6
4	Vladimir Pronin	Russia	8:25.93		5
5	Justin Chaston	Great Britain	8:26.82		4
6	Rafał Wójcik	Poland	8:38.98		3
7	Aleksey Patserin	Ukraine	8:42.32		2
8	Magnus Bengtsson	Sweden	8:58.87		1

=== 4 × 100 metres relay ===
24 June

Rank	Nation	Athletes	Time	Note	Points
1	Great Britain	Jason Gardener, Tony Jarrett, Darren Braithwaite, Linford Christie	38.73		8
2	Germany	Christian Konieczny, Robert Kurnicki, Michael Huke, Marc Blume	39.12		7
3	Italy	Angelo Cipolloni, Alessandro Orlandi, Ezio Madonia, Andrea Colombo	39.19		6
4	Sweden	Patrik Strenius, Matias Ghansah, Lars Hedner, Peter Karlsson	39.31		5
5	Ukraine	Konstantin Rurak, Dmytro Vanyaikin, Aleksey Chikhachev, Vladyslav Dolohodin	39.31		4
6	Spain	Luis Turón, Francisco Navarro, Jordi Mayoral, Pedro Pablo Nolet	39.77		3
7	Poland	Marcin Krzywański, Piotr Wrotek, Marek Zalewski, Michał Michalski	39.86		2
8	Russia	Aleksandr Porkhomovskiy, Aleksandr Sokolov, Andrey Grigoryev, Konstantin Dyomin	40.93		1

=== 4 × 400 metres relay ===
25 June

Rank	Nation	Athletes	Time	Note	Points
1	Great Britain	Iwan Thomas, Adrian Patrick, Mark Richardson, Roger Black	3:00.34		8
2	Italy	Marco Vaccari, Fabrizio Mori, Alessandro Aimar, Andrea Nuti	3:04.27		7
3	Germany	Kai Karsten, Daniel Bittner, Markus Rau, Uwe Jahn	3:04.28		6
4	Poland	Piotr Rysiukiewicz, Paweł Januszewski, Robert Maćkowiak, Tomasz Jędrusik	3:04.42		5
5	Russia	Dmitriy Kosov, Mikhail Vdovin, Ruslan Mashchenko, Dmitriy Golovastov	3:04.46		4
6	Ukraine	Roman Galkin, Gennadiy Gorbenko, Valentin Kulbatskiy, Oleh Tverdokhlib	3:05.54		3
7	Sweden	Marko Granat, Sven Nylander, Johan Lannefors, Niklas Wallenlind	3:06.96		2
8	Spain	Pablo Escribá, Iñigo Monreal, Manuel Moreno, Cayetano Cornet	3:07.67		1

=== High jump ===
24 June

Rank	Name	Nationality	2.10	2.15	2.18	2.21	2.23	2.25	2.27	2.29	2.31	2.33	2.35	Result	Notes	Points
1	Steve Smith	Great Britain	–	o	–	–	o	–	xo	–	xxo	–	xx	2.31		8
2	Patrik Sjöberg	Sweden	–	–	–	o	–	xxo	xo	–	xxo	xxx		2.31		7
3	Artur Partyka	Poland	–	o	–	–	–	xo	–	xxx				2.25		6
4	Wolf-Hendrik Beyer	Germany	–	xo	x–	o	xo	xo	xxx					2.25		5
5	Vyacheslav Tyrtyshnik	Ukraine	xo	o	o	o	xxo	xxx						2.23		4
6	Arturo Ortiz	Spain	o	xo	–	xo	–	xx–	x					2.21		3
7	Grigory Fyodorkov	Russia	xo	o	–	xxx								2.15		2
8	Ettore Ceresoli	Italy	o	xo	–	xxx								2.15		1

=== Pole vault ===
25 June

Rank	Name	Nationality	5.00	5.20	5.40	5.50	5.60	5.65	5.75	5.80	6.00	Result	Notes	Points
1	Igor Trandenkov	Russia	–	–	–	–	o	–	–	xxo	xxx	5.80		8
2	Patrik Stenlund	Sweden	–	o	xo	o	xo	–	xxx			5.60		7
3	Javier García	Spain	–	o	o	o	x–	xx				5.50		6
4	Andrea Pegoraro	Italy	–	xo	xo	o	xxx					5.50		5
5	Vyacheslav Shuteyev	Ukraine	–	xo	o	xxo	xxx					5.50		4
6	Nick Buckfield	Great Britain	–	o	xxx							5.50		3
7	Adam Kolasa	Poland	o	xo	xxx							5.20		2
	Tim Lobinger	Germany	–	xxx								NM		0

=== Long jump ===
24 June

Rank	Name	Nationality	#1	#2	#3	#4	#5	#6	Result	Notes	Points
1	Stanislav Tarasenko	Russia	7.96	8.14	8.01	8.32w	x	x	8.32w		8
2	Konstantin Krause	Germany	x	x	8.11	x	x	8.07	8.11		7
3	Vitaliy Kirilenko	Ukraine	7.48	7.49w	7.85w	8.00w	8.04w	8.11w	8.11w		6
4	Roberto Coltri	Italy	7.60	x	x	8.01w	7.91w	8.11	8.11		5
5	Krzysztof Łuczak	Poland	7.71w	6.93	7.96w	x	x	7.73	7.96w		4
6	Jesús Oliván	Spain	7.67w	7.86w	7.59w	7.79w	7.73w	x	7.86w		3
7	Peter Oldin	Sweden	7.63w	x	x	x	x	7.69w	7.69w		2
8	John Munroe	Great Britain	7.55	7.64	7.54w	7.51w	7.42	7.50	7.64		1

=== Triple jump ===
25 June

Rank	Name	Nationality	#1	#2	#3	#4	#5	#6	Result	Notes	Points
1	Jonathan Edwards	Great Britain	17.90w	18.43w (Note: Wind: +2.4 m/s – longest jump ever all conditions.)	17.72	18.39w	–	–	18.43w		8
2	Jacek Butkiewicz	Poland	16.49	16.29w	17.14w	17.05	x	–	17.14w		7
3	Arne Holm	Sweden	15.60	16.64	16.64w	15.69	16.70w	16.70w	16.70w		6
4	Julio López	Spain	14.53	16.63w	x	x	15.67	16.67w	16.67w		5
5	Volker Mai	Germany	15.92w	16.56	16.33	16.57	16.24	16.42	16.57		4
6	Andrea Matarazzo	Italy	15.72	x	16.40	15.80	15.89w	16.44	16.44		3
7	Viktor Sotnikov	Russia	15.60	16.28w	15.68w	15.77	15.74	14.97	16.28		2
8	Gennadiy Glushenko	Ukraine	15.86w	13.41	15.66w	x	16.09	16.20w	16.20w		1

=== Shot put ===
24 June

Rank	Name	Nationality	#1	#2	#3	#4	#5	#6	Result	Notes	Points
1	Oleksandr Bagach	Ukraine	20.26	x	20.18	20.24	20.65	x	20.65		8
2	Oliver-Sven Buder	Germany	20.15	20.28	20.12	20.26	20.25	20.22	20.28		7
3	Paolo Dal Soglio	Italy	19.80	x	x	x	x	x	19.80		6
4	Manuel Martínez	Spain	18.54	18.92	18.37	18.09	x	18.97	18.97		5
5	Thomas Hammarsten	Sweden	18.54	18.27	17.97	x	18.21	?	18.54		4
6	Sergey Nikolayev	Russia	18.35	18.49	18.30	18.31	x	x	18.49		3
7	Piotr Perżyło	Poland	x	x	17.60	18.00	18.11	x	18.11		2
8	Matt Simson	Great Britain							17.72		1

=== Discus throw ===
25 June

Rank	Name	Nationality	#1	#2	#3	#4	#5	#6	Result	Notes	Points
1	Lars Riedel	Germany	67.12	67.42	x	68.76	66.90	x	68.76	CR	8
2	Sergey Lyakhov	Russia	61.48	61.48	63.82	x	x	x	63.82		7
3	Robert Weir	Great Britain	58.70	62.94	60.26	59.72	59.34	61.04	62.94		6
4	Kristian Petterson	Sweden	62.52	x	59.54	x	x	62.52	62.52		5
5	Volodymyr Zinchenko	Ukraine	57.64	58.26	57.32	56.50	58.06	59.74	59.74		4
6	Diego Fortuna	Italy	x	57.14	53.56	56.24	57.20	58.52	58.52		3
7	David Martínez	Spain	54.92	x	52.96	55.10	56.22	57.48	57.48		2
8	Andrzej Krawczyk	Poland	52.82	54.92	x	55.62	x	x	55.62		1

=== Hammer throw ===
25 June

Rank	Name	Nationality	#1	#2	#3	#4	#5	#6	Result	Notes	Points
1	Ilya Konovalov	Russia	77.90	79.66	77.62	75.28	76.64	76.70	79.66		8
2	Vadim Kolesnik	Ukraine	75.54	x	77.46	74.60	77.60	x	77.60		7
3	Karsten Kobs	Germany	74.54	76.32	x	74.40	74.98	76.18	76.32		6
4	Per Karlsson	Sweden	71.66	74.76	x	x	x	75.22	75.22		5
5	Enrico Sgrulletti	Italy	72.48	74.10	x	73.06	75.14	70.16	75.14		4
6	Szymon Ziółkowski	Poland	x	70.46	70.48	x	70.82	72.66	72.66		3
7	Peter Vivian	Great Britain	69.74	x	70.72	x	71.28	71.16	71.28		2
8	José Manuel Pérez	Spain	x	x	x	x	66.76	x	66.76		1

=== Javelin throw ===
24 June

Rank	Name	Nationality	#1	#2	#3	#4	#5	#6	Result	Notes	Points
1	Raymond Hecht	Germany	87.24	–	–	–	–	–	87.24		8
2	Andrey Moruyev	Russia	79.94	79.12	80.42	79.40	81.40	82.80	82.80		7
3	Steve Backley	Great Britain	80.84	80.60	81.10	81.96	80.46	80.54	81.96		6
4	Mirosław Witek	Poland	x	73.80	78.00	x	77.56	77.42	78.00		5
5	Andriy Uglov	Ukraine	63.56	71.96	75.82	x	–	–	75.82		4
6	Peter Borglund	Sweden	72.24	68.94	69.26	73.76	70.62	x	73.76		3
7	Carlo Sonego	Italy	67.08	68.60	68.92	x	67.84	x	68.92		2
8	Julián Sotelo	Spain	63.86	63.58	x	64.58	61.22	63.04	64.58		1

== Women's results ==
=== 100 metres ===
24 June
Wind: +2.0 m/s

Rank	Name	Nationality	Time	Notes	Points
1	Melanie Paschke	Germany	11.08		8
2	Yekaterina Leshcheva	Russia	11.16		7
3	Delphine Combe	France	11.30		6
4	Stephi Douglas	Great Britain	11.30		5
5	Irina Pukha	Ukraine	11.35		4
6	Natalya Vinogradova	Belarus	11.49		3
7	Laura Ardissone	Italy	11.55		2
8	Izabela Czajko	Poland	11.64		1

=== 200 metres ===
25 June
Wind: +0.8 m/s

Rank	Name	Nationality	Time	Notes	Points
1	Silke Knoll	Germany	22.45		8
2	Marina Trandenkova	Russia	22.67		7
3	Viktoriya Fomenko	Ukraine	22.75		6
4	Paula Thomas	Great Britain	22.89		5
5	Delphine Combe	France	23.11		4
6	Natalya Vinogradova	Belarus	23.15		3
7	Giada Gallina	Italy	23.53		2
8	Izabela Czajko	Poland	23.93		1

=== 400 metres ===
24 June

Rank	Name	Nationality	Time	Notes	Points
1	Melanie Neef	Great Britain	51.35		8
2	Yuliya Sotnikova	Russia	51.81		7
3	Yelena Rurak	Ukraine	52.92		6
4	Evelyne Elien	France	52.92		5
5	Linda Kisabaka	Germany	53.06		4
6	Danielle Perpoli	Italy	53.12		3
7	Anna Kozak	Belarus	53.59		2
8	Barbara Grzywocz	Poland	54.90		1

=== 800 metres ===
24 June

Rank	Name	Nationality	Time	Notes	Points
1	Yelena Afanasyeva	Russia	1:59.26		8
2	Patricia Djaté	France	1:59.73		7
3	Natalya Dukhnova	Belarus	2:00.07		6
4	Sonya Bowyer	Great Britain	2:01.67		5
5	Lidia Chojecka	Poland	2:02.42		4
6	Kati Kovacs	Germany	2:02.95		3
7	Eleonora Berlanda	Italy	2:04.63		2
8	Svetlana Tverdokhleb	Ukraine	2:04.87		1

=== 1500 metres ===
25 June

Rank	Name	Nationality	Time	Notes	Points
1	Kelly Holmes	Great Britain	4:07.02		8
2	Yekaterina Podkopayeva	Russia	4:07.88		7
3	Svetlana Miroshnik	Ukraine	4:07.94		6
4	Carmen Wüstenhagen	Germany	4:09.77		5
5	Yelena Bychkovskaya	Belarus	4:10.79		4
6	Frédérique Quentin	France	4:11.95		3
7	Małgorzata Rydz	Poland	4:14.78		2
8	Serenella Sbrissa	Italy	4:16.52		1

=== 5000 metres ===
24 June

Rank	Name	Nationality	Time	Notes	Points
1	Viktoriya Nenasheva	Russia	15:16.06		8
2	Alison Wyeth	Great Britain	15:19.44		7
3	Tamara Koba	Ukraine	15:20.97		6
4	Silvia Sommaggio	Italy	15:32.20		5
5	Rosario Murcia	France	15:32.80		4
6	Yelena Mazovka	Belarus	15:36.09		3
7	Claudia Dreher	Germany	15:54.93		2
8	Renata Sobiesiak	Poland	16:56.87		1

=== 10,000 metres ===
25 June

Rank	Name	Nationality	Time	Notes	Points
1	Maria Guida	Italy	32:01.75		8
2	Uta Pippig	Germany	32:14.66		7
3	Alla Zhilyayeva	Russia	32:17.62		6
4	Liz McColgan	Great Britain	32:22.09		5
5	Natalya Galushko	Belarus	32:50.12		4
6	Nicole Lévêque	France	33:57.31		3
7	Yuliya Kovalyova	Ukraine	34:29.74		2
8	Dorota Gruca	Poland	35:50.11		1

=== 100 metres hurdles ===
25 June
Wind: +1.5 m/s

Rank	Name	Nationality	Time	Notes	Points
1	Yuliya Graudyn	Russia	12.86		8
2	Yelena Ovcharova	Ukraine	12.88		7
3	Jacqui Agyepong	Great Britain	12.90		6
4	Monique Tourret	France	12.92		5
5	Lidiya Yurkova	Belarus	13.01		4
6	Caren Jung	Germany	13.13		3
7	Carla Tuzzi	Italy	13.16		2
8	Urszula Włodarczyk	Poland	13.56		1

=== 400 metres hurdles ===
24 June

Rank	Name	Nationality	Time	Notes	Points
1	Marie-José Pérec	France	54.51		8
2	Tatyana Kurochkina	Belarus	55.59		7
3	Tetyana Tereshchuk	Ukraine	56.05		6
4	Heike Meißner	Germany	56.25		5
5	Monika Warnicka	Poland	57.35		4
6	Olga Nazarova	Russia	57.61		3
7	Louise Fraser	Great Britain	57.91		2
8	Virna De Angeli	Italy	58.16		1

=== 4 × 100 metres relay ===
24 June

Rank	Nation	Athletes	Time	Note	Points
1	Russia	Natalya Voronova, Galina Malchugina, Marina Trandenkova, Yekaterina Leshcheva	42.74		8
2	Germany	Melanie Paschke, Birgit Rockmeier, Silke-Beate Knoll, Silke Lichtenhagen	43.15		7
3	France	Patricia Girard, Odiah Sidibe, Delphine Combe, Maguy Nestoret	43.63		6
4	Great Britain	Stephi Douglas, Katharine Merry, Simmone Jacobs, Paula Thomas	44.10		5
5	Italy	Laura Ardissone, Carla Tuzzi, Giada Gallina, Manuela Levorato	44.27		4
6	Ukraine	Anzhelika Shevchuk, Viktoriya Fomenko, Anzhela Balakhonova, Irina Pukha	44.35		3
7	Belarus	Margarita Molchan, Natalya Vinogradova, Natalya Vorobyev, Natallia Solohub	44.85		2
8	Poland	Anna Głowacka, Dorota Krawczak, Monika Borejza, Izabela Czajko	45.47		1

=== 4 × 400 metres relay ===
25 June

Rank	Nation	Athletes	Time	Note	Points
1	Russia	Yelena Andreyeva, Tatyana Chebykina, Yuliya Sotnikova, Olga Nazarova	3:24.69		8
2	Germany	Karin Janke, Jana Schönenberger, Sandra Kuschmann, Uta Rohländer	3:26.23		7
3	Ukraine	Viktoriya Fomenko, Yana Manuylova, Olga Moroz, Yelena Rurak	3:27.33		6
4	Great Britain	Melanie Neef, Lorraine Hanson, Sharon Tunaley, Georgina Oladapo	3:28.34		5
5	Italy	Francesca Carbone, Patrizia Spuri, Danielle Perpoli, Virna De Angeli	3:29.39	NR	4
6	France	Evelyne Elien, Sophie Domenech, Francine Landre, Marie-Line Scholent	3:29.64		3
7	Belarus	Anna Kozak, Tamara Kupriyanovich, Tatyana Kurochkina, Natalya Dukhnova	3:29.65		2
8	Poland	Barbara Grzywocz, Sylwia Kwilińska, Inga Tarnawska, Sylwia Pachut	3:34.72		1

=== High jump ===
25 June

Rank	Name	Nationality	1.70	1.75	1.80	1.83	1.86	1.89	1.92	1.94	1.96	1.98	2.00	2.04	Result	Notes	Points
1	Alina Astafei	Germany	–	–	–	–	o	o	x–	o	–	o	o	xxx	2.00		8
2	Tatyana Motkova	Russia	–	–	–	–	o	o	o	o	o	xo	xxx		1.98		7
3	Tatyana Shevchik	Belarus	–	–	–	o	o	o	o	o	o	xxx			1.96		6
4	Katarzyna Majchrzak	Poland	–	–	o	–	o	o	o	xxx					1.92		5
5	Larisa Serebryanskaya	Ukraine	–	o	xo	xo	o	xxo	xxx						1.89		4
6	Lea Haggett	Great Britain	–	o	o	o	xo	xxx							1.86		3
7	Isabelle Jeanne	France	–	xo	o	xo	xo	xxx							1.86		2
8	Stefania Lovison	Italy	o	xo	xo	xxx									1.80		1

=== Long jump ===
25 June

Rank	Name	Nationality	#1	#2	#3	#4	#5	#6	Result	Notes	Points
1	Heike Drechsler	Germany	7.04w	x	–	x	–	–	7.04w		8
2	Fiona May	Italy	6.57	6.96	6.77	6.98w	6.74w	6.73	6.98w	NR (Note: 6.96 metres with legal wind)	7
3	Nadine Caster	France	6.86w	x	6.72	6.94	6.67w	x	6.94	NR	6
4	Olga Rubleva	Russia	6.93w	6.67w	6.90	6.91w	6.87	6.80	6.93w		5
5	Agata Karczmarek	Poland	6.67w	6.72	6.66w	x	6.63w	x	6.72		4
6	Olena Khlopotnova	Ukraine	6.69	6.53	6.62w	3.78	6.44w	6.21w	6.69		3
7	Anzhela Atroshchenko	Belarus	6.46w	4.61	6.47w	x	6.21	6.51w	6.51w		2
8	Denise Lewis	Great Britain	6.22	6.51	6.17	x	6.22w	6.28	6.51		1

=== Triple jump ===
24 June

Rank	Name	Nationality	#1	#2	#3	#4	#5	#6	Result	Notes	Points
1	Ashia Hansen	Great Britain	14.22w	14.37	x	14.32w	–	x	14.37	CR, NR	8
2	Yelena Sinchukova	Russia	13.98w	x	13.92	14.02w	13.86w	14.30w	14.30w		7
3	Zhanna Gureyeva	Belarus	x	13.17	14.02w	14.25	14.17	14.18w	14.25	NR	6
4	Olena Khlusovych	Ukraine	13.89w	13.93	14.08	13.92w			14.08		5
5	Barbara Lah	Italy	13.89	x	13.70	14.06w	x	13.86w	14.06w		4
6	Caroline Honoré	France	13.43w	13.73w	13.54	13.55	13.45	13.51w	13.73w		3
7	Ramona Molzan	Germany	13.20w	x	x	13.39w	12.72w	x	13.39w		2
8	Ilona Pazola	Poland	12.95	13.05	12.96	13.10	13.09w	13.31	13.31		1

=== Shot put ===
24 June

Rank	Name	Nationality	#1	#2	#3	#4	#5	#6	Result	Notes	Points
1	Astrid Kumbernuss	Germany	19.67	19.90	19.91	19.83	20.00	19.97	20.00		8
2	Irina Korzhanenko	Russia	x	17.66	18.32	18.31	17.87	18.02	18.32		7
3	Judy Oakes	Great Britain	18.17	x	x	x	18.00	17.94	18.17		6
4	Nadezhda Lukyniv	Ukraine	x	17.22	17.14	17.40	x	17.06	17.40		5
5	Natalya Gurskaya	Belarus	16.63	16.66	16.77	16.47	x	16.51	16.77		4
6	Mara Rosolen	Italy	x	x	15.00	16.29	16.57	x	16.57		3
7	Laurence Manfredi	France	14.78	15.67	x	15.47	x	x	15.67		2
8	Katarzyna Żakowicz	Poland	15.30	x	15.13	15.59	x	15.23	15.59		1

=== Discus throw ===
24 June

Rank	Name	Nationality	#1	#2	#3	#4	#5	#6	Result	Notes	Points
1	Natalya Sadova	Russia	61.00	x	66.86	64.70	65.52	64.48	66.86		8
2	Ilke Wyludda	Germany	64.40	62.98	60.56	64.80	63.72	66.04	66.04		7
3	Irina Yatchenko	Belarus	63.48	64.46	62.96	x	x	61.64	64.46		6
4	Renata Katewicz	Poland	x	56.98	60.00	61.68	61.70	x	61.70		5
5	Jackie McKernan	Great Britain	59.06	x	x	55.48	56.08	55.38	59.06		4
6	Isabelle Devaluez	France	55.04	57.68	55.98	56.00	x	55.98	57.68		3
7	Agnese Maffeis	Italy	57.26	56.28	53.58	57.16	57.22	x	57.26		2
8	Viktoriya Boyko	Ukraine	54.72	51.66	54.12	55.24	x	x	55.24		1

=== Javelin throw ===
25 June – Old model

Rank	Name	Nationality	#1	#2	#3	#4	#5	#6	Result	Notes	Points
1	Steffi Nerius	Germany	61.96	x	63.56	63.22	x	68.42	68.42		8
2	Natalya Shikolenko	Belarus	59.34	63.42	x	63.08	61.42	x	63.42		7
3	Yekaterina Ivakina	Russia	58.40	61.36	60.64	x	58.26	59.20	61.36		6
4	Martine Bègue	France	54.76	x	55.86	52.96	x	54.40	55.86		5
5	Olha Ivankova	Ukraine	55.78	49.98	55.82	50.7x	52.72	x	55.82		4
6	Ewa Rybak	Poland	53.92	54.84	51.76	50.32	49.00	54.44	54.84		3
7	Sharon Gibson	Great Britain	52.52	52.86	50.28	52.66	54.38	51.82	54.38		2
8	Claudia Coslovich	Italy	53.48	49.18	x	x	x	51.12	53.48		1
