= 1995 IAAF World Indoor Championships – Women's 400 metres =

The women's 400 metres event at the 1995 IAAF World Indoor Championships was held on 10–12 March.

== Medalists ==
Gold	Silver	Bronze
Irina Privalova; Russia	Sandie Richards; Jamaica	Daniela Georgieva; Bulgaria

== Results ==
=== Heats ===
First 2 of each heat (Q) and next 4 fastest (q) qualified for the semifinals.

Rank	Heat	Name	Nationality	Time	Notes
1	1	Jearl Miles	United States	52.48	Q
2	4	Daniela Georgieva	Bulgaria	52.67	Q
3	3	Irina Privalova	Russia	52.78	Q
4	1	Marie-Louise Bévis	France	52.79	Q
5	1	Tatyana Chebykina	Russia	52.84	q
6	4	Deon Hemmings	Jamaica	52.91	Q
7	4	Helena Dziurová	Czech Republic	53.05	q
8	2	Magdalena Nedelcu	Romania	53.10	Q
9	2	Sandie Richards	Jamaica	53.14	Q
10	2	Sandra Myers	Spain	53.22	q
11	3	Kim Graham	United States	53.23	Q
12	3	Naděžda Koštovalová	Czech Republic	53.33	q
12	2	Melanie Neef	Great Britain	53.34	
13	4	Theodora Kyriakou	Cyprus	53.46	
14	1	Yolanda Reyes	Spain	53.56	
15	3	Linda Kisabaka	Germany	53.68	
16	3	Susan Earnshaw	Great Britain	53.85	
17	1	Zhang Hengyun	China	54.27	
18	2	Cao Chunying	China	55.32	
	4	Myadagmaa Otgontuya	Mongolia	DNS	

=== Semifinals ===
First 3 of each semifinal qualified directly (Q) for the final.

Rank	Heat	Name	Nationality	Time	Notes
1	1	Irina Privalova	Russia	51.82	Q
2	1	Daniela Georgieva	Bulgaria	52.34	Q
3	2	Sandie Richards	Jamaica	52.56	Q
4	2	Jearl Miles	United States	52.61	Q
5	1	Deon Hemmings	Jamaica	52.77	Q
6	2	Marie-Louise Bévis	France	52.85	Q
7	2	Tatyana Chebykina	Russia	53.13	
8	2	Magdalena Nedelcu	Romania	53.17	
9	1	Helena Dziurová	Czech Republic	53.18	
10	2	Naděžda Koštovalová	Czech Republic	53.38	
11	1	Kim Graham	United States	53.46	
12	1	Sandra Myers	Spain	53.75	

=== Final ===
Rank	Name	Nationality	Time	Notes
1st place, gold medalist(s)	Irina Privalova	Russia	50.23	CR
2nd place, silver medalist(s)	Sandie Richards	Jamaica	51.38	
3rd place, bronze medalist(s)	Daniela Georgieva	Bulgaria	51.78	
4	Deon Hemmings	Jamaica	52.01	
5	Jearl Miles	United States	52.01	
6	Marie-Louise Bévis	France	53.27	
