= 1995 World Championships in Athletics – Women's 400 metres =

These are the results of the Women's 400 metres event at the 1995 World Championships in Athletics in Gothenburg, Sweden.

== Medalists ==
Gold	Marie-José Pérec; France (FRA)
Silver	(The Bahamas) Pauline Davis; Bahamas (BAH)
Bronze	Jearl Miles; United States (USA)

== Results ==
=== Heats ===
First 3 of each heat (Q) and the next 3 fastest (q) qualified for the semifinals.

Rank	Heat	Name	Nationality	Time	Notes
1	7	Fatima Yusuf	Nigeria	50.60	Q
2	5	Falilat Ogunkoya	Nigeria	50.72	Q
3	5	Jearl Miles	United States	50.94	Q
4	4	Sandra Myers	Spain	51.14	Q
5	4	Pauline Davis	Bahamas	51.21	Q
6	2	Maicel Malone-Wallace	United States	51.22	Q
7	3	Marie-José Pérec	France	51.24	Q
8	7	Renee Poetschka	Australia	51.26	Q
9	1	Cathy Freeman	Australia	51.29	Q
10	6	Sandie Richards	Jamaica	51.30	Q
11	5	Claudine Williams	Jamaica	51.32	Q
11	6	Yelena Rurak	Ukraine	51.32	Q
13	6	Daniela Georgieva	Bulgaria	51.37	Q
14	1	Melanie Neef	Great Britain	51.39	Q
14	3	Yuliya Sotnikova	Russia	51.39	Q
14	4	Kim Graham	United States	51.39	Q
14	5	Nancy McLeón	Cuba	51.39	q
18	4	Li Jing	China	51.50	q
19	3	Zhang Hengyun	China	51.51	Q
20	2	Julia Duporty	Cuba	51.55	Q
21	2	Olga Nazarova	Russia	51.55	Q
22	7	Ximena Restrepo	Colombia	51.57	Q
23	1	Tatyana Chebykina	Russia	51.58	Q, PB
24	3	Uta Rohländer	Germany	51.68	q
25	2	Olabisi Afolabi	Nigeria	51.79	
26	1	Linda Kisabaka	Germany	51.96	
26	3	Norfalia Carabalí	Colombia	51.96	
26	6	Helena Fuchsová	Czech Republic	51.96	
29	4	Sandra Kuschmann	Germany	51.99	
30	7	Ludmila Formanová	Czech Republic	52.05	
31	1	Idalmis Bonne	Cuba	52.10	
32	7	Merlene Frazer	Jamaica	52.24	
33	4	Olga Moroz	Ukraine	52.31	
34	6	Lee Naylor	Australia	52.37	
35	7	Dora Kyriakou	Cyprus	52.81	
36	5	Evelyne Elien	France	53.34	
37	1	Zoila Stewart	Costa Rica	53.48	
38	2	Grace Birungi	Uganda	53.92	
38	2	Ngozi Mwanamwambwa	Zambia	53.92	NR
38	7	Mary-Estelle Kapalu	Vanuatu	53.92	NR
41	3	Öznur Dursun	Turkey	54.21	
42	5	Mercy Addy	Ghana	54.28	
43	1	Hsu Pei-Chin	Chinese Taipei	54.93	
44	6	Vernetta Lesforis	Saint Lucia	56.43	
45	2	Lu Xifang	China	56.64	
46	6	Mirna El-Laz	Lebanon	59.96	
47	4	Sharron Celecia	Gibraltar	1:01.03	
48	7	Bipendu Mbombo	Zaire	1:01.60	
	5	Bernice Morton	Saint Kitts and Nevis	DQ	
	6	Francine Landre	France	DNF	
	3	Kannan Solaimathi	India	DNS	
	4	Kate Clarke	Liberia	DNS	

=== Semifinals ===
First 2 of each heat (Q) and the next 2 fastest (q) qualified for the final.

Rank	Heat	Name	Nationality	Time	Notes
1	3	Jearl Miles	United States	50.39	Q
2	3	Marie-José Pérec	France	50.42	Q
3	2	Pauline Davis	Bahamas	50.43	Q
4	1	Cathy Freeman	Australia	50.49	Q
5	1	Fatima Yusuf	Nigeria	50.56	Q
6	1	Sandie Richards	Jamaica	50.64	q
7	2	Maicel Malone-Wallace	United States	50.77	Q
8	3	Falilat Ogunkoya	Nigeria	50.85	q
9	2	Renee Poetschka	Australia	51.00	
10	2	Sandra Myers	Spain	51.03	
11	1	Melanie Neef	Great Britain	51.18	
12	1	Yuliya Sotnikova	Russia	51.41	
13	2	Nancy McLeón	Cuba	51.46	
14	2	Daniela Georgieva	Bulgaria	51.65	
15	2	Tatyana Chebykina	Russia	51.67	
16	1	Kim Graham	United States	51.77	
17	1	Ximena Restrepo	Colombia	51.82	
18	3	Olga Nazarova	Russia	51.83	
19	3	Julia Duporty	Cuba	51.85	
20	3	Uta Rohländer	Germany	51.99	
21	3	Yelena Rurak	Ukraine	52.01	
22	3	Zhang Hengyun	China	52.59	
23	2	Claudine Williams	Jamaica	52.99	
24	1	Li Jing	China	53.46	

=== Final ===
Rank	Lane	Name	Nationality	Time	Notes
1st place, gold medalist(s)	6	Marie-José Pérec	France	49.28	
2nd place, silver medalist(s)	5	Pauline Davis	Bahamas	49.96	NR
3rd place, bronze medalist(s)	3	Jearl Miles	United States	50.00	
4	4	Cathy Freeman	Australia	50.60	
5	1	Fatima Yusuf	Nigeria	50.70	
6	8	Falilat Ogunkoya	Nigeria	50.77	
7	7	Maicel Malone-Wallace	United States	50.99	
8	2	Sandie Richards	Jamaica	51.13	
