= Athletics at the 1995 Summer Universiade – Women's 400 metres =

The women's 400 metres event at the 1995 Summer Universiade was held on 31 August – 1 September at the Hakatanomori Athletic Stadium in Fukuoka, Japan.

== Medalists ==
Gold	Silver	Bronze
Olabisi Afolabi; Nigeria	Tatyana Chebykina; Russia	Olena Rurak; Ukraine

Note: Du Xiujie of China originally won the silver with 50.72 but was later disqualified for doping.

== Results ==
=== Heats ===
Qualification: First 3 of each heat (Q) and the next 1 fastest (q) qualified for the semifinals.

Rank	Heat	Athlete	Nationality	Time	Notes
1	2	Yelena Andreyeva	Russia	52.29	Q
2	2	Nicole Green	United States	52.47	Q
3	1	Olabisi Afolabi	Nigeria	53.01	Q
4	4	Tatyana Chebykina	Russia	53.15	Q
5	3	Camara Jones	United States	53.27	Q
6	3	Naděžda Koštovalová	Czech Republic	53.49	Q
7	4	Tatyana Movchan	Ukraine	53.51	Q
8	5	Olena Rurak	Ukraine	54.10	Q
9	3	Lee Naylor	Australia	54.25	Q
10	5	LaDonna Antoine	Canada	54.26	Q
11	2	Zoila Stewart	Costa Rica	54.30	Q
12	4	Nicole Commissiong	Canada	54.44	q
13	3	Satomi Kasashima	Japan	54.45	
14	5	Sandra Kuschmann	Germany	54.57	Q
15	3	Omotayo Akinyemi	Nigeria	54.68	
16	5	Louise Whitehead	Great Britain	54.92	
17	1	Yolanda Reyes	Spain	54.97	Q
18	1	Danielle Perpoli	Italy	55.37	Q
19	4	Kazue Kakinuma	Japan	55.81	
20	5	Monika Gachevska	Bulgaria	55.86	
21	3	Guilhermina da Cruz	Angola	55.89	
22	1	Denise Ouabangui	Central African Republic	56.38	
23	5	Merci Colorado	Ecuador	56.88	
24	4	Shanti Ramachandran	Malaysia	57.09	
25	1	Agnes Samaria	Namibia	57.63	
26	2	Rachael Rowberry	New Zealand	57.77	
27	1	Choi Hiu Nam	Hong Kong	58.74	
28	4	Rosa Evora	El Salvador	1:03.13	
29	5	Prisca Bruno	Tanzania	1:14.54	
	4	Du Xiujie	China	DQ	
	1	Myriam Léonie Mani	Cameroon	DNS	
	2	Delia Castro	Mexico	DNS	
	2	Sandra Moya	Puerto Rico	DNS	
	2	Patricia Rodríguez	Colombia	DNS	
	3	Martha Ludeña	Peru	DNS	
	5	Aksel Gürcan	Turkey	DNS	

=== Semifinals ===
Qualification: First 4 of each semifinal qualified directly (Q) for the final.

Rank	Heat	Athlete	Nationality	Time	Notes
1	2	Olabisi Afolabi	Nigeria	52.50	Q
2	1	Yelena Andreyeva	Russia	52.51	Q
3	1	Camara Jones	United States	52.57	Q
4	1	Olena Rurak	Ukraine	52.61	Q
5	1	Naděžda Koštovalová	Czech Republic	52.67	Q
6	1	Sandra Kuschmann	Germany	53.05	
7	2	Tatyana Chebykina	Russia	53.11	Q
8	2	Nicole Green	United States	53.51	Q
9	1	Zoila Stewart	Costa Rica	53.59	
10	2	Tatyana Movchan	Ukraine	53.66	
11	1	Lee Naylor	Australia	54.13	
12	1	LaDonna Antoine	Canada	54.43	
13	2	Yolanda Reyes	Spain	54.68	
14	2	Nicole Commissiong	Canada	55.06	
15	2	Danielle Perpoli	Italy	55.53	
	2	Du Xiujie	China	DQ	

=== Final ===
Rank	Lane	Athlete	Nationality	Time	Notes
1st place, gold medalist(s)	6	Olabisi Afolabi	Nigeria	50.50	
2nd place, silver medalist(s)	1	Tatyana Chebykina	Russia	51.01	
3rd place, bronze medalist(s)	7	Olena Rurak	Ukraine	51.76	
4	4	Yelena Andreyeva	Russia	51.85	
5	5	Camara Jones	United States	52.07	
6	2	Naděžda Koštovalová	Czech Republic	52.08	
7	8	Nicole Green	United States	53.21	
	3	Du Xiujie	China	DQ	
