= Athletics at the 1996 Summer Olympics – Women's 400 metres =

Women's 400 metres at the Games of the XXVI Olympiad
- Venue: Centennial Olympic Stadium
- Dates: 26 July 1996 (heats); 27 July 1996 (quarter-finals); 28 July 1996 (semi-finals); 29 July 1996 (final)
- Competitors: 49 from 35 nations
- Winning time: 48.25 OR

Medalists
| 1st place, gold medalist(s) | | Marie-José Pérec; France |
| 2nd place, silver medalist(s) | | Cathy Freeman; Australia |
| 3rd place, bronze medalist(s) | | Falilat Ogunkoya; Nigeria |

Official Video Highlights

These are the official results of the Women's 400 metres event at the 1996 Summer Olympics in Atlanta, Georgia. There were a total of 49 competitors. The winning margin was 0.38 seconds.

Pérec's winning time remains the #4 time in history. Freeman's second place time remains the #8 time in history. Ogunkoya and Davis also still rank on the all-time top 20. Places 3 through 6 are all the fastest times for those places in history and all of the top six, except Miles set their lifetime personal bests in this race.

== Results ==
=== Heats ===
Qualification: First 4 in each heat (Q) and the next 4 fastest (q) qualified to the quarterfinals.

| Rank | Heat | Name | Nationality | Time | Notes |
|---|---|---|---|---|---|
| 1 | 1 | Pauline Davis | Bahamas | 51.00 | Q |
| 2 | 1 | Svetlana Goncharenko | Russia | 51.07 | Q |
| 3 | 2 | Maicel Malone | United States | 51.28 | Q |
| 4 | 1 | Phylis Smith | Great Britain | 51.29 | Q |
| 5 | 1 | Renee Poetschka | Australia | 51.55 | Q |
| 6 | 2 | Juliet Campbell | Jamaica | 51.57 | Q |
| 7 | 4 | Virna de Angeli | Italy | 51.68 | Q |
| 8 | 3 | Kim Graham | United States | 51.70 | Q |
| 9 | 3 | Helena Fuchsová | Czech Republic | 51.71 | Q |
| 10 | 4 | Sandie Richards | Jamaica | 51.79 | Q |
| 11 | 7 | Bisi Afolabi | Nigeria | 51.80 | Q |
| 12 | 4 | Marie-José Pérec | France | 51.82 | Q |
| 13 | 2 | Grace-Ann Dinkins | Liberia | 51.83 | Q |
| 14 | 2 | Olga Kotlyarova | Russia | 51.90 | Q |
| 15 | 5 | Jearl Miles | United States | 51.96 | Q |
| 16 | 4 | Ladonna Antoine | Canada | 51.99 | Q |
| 16 | 7 | Cathy Freeman | Australia | 51.99 | Q |
| 18 | 1 | Dora Kyriakou | Cyprus | 52.09 | q |
| 19 | 5 | Grit Breuer | Germany | 52.20 | Q |
| 20 | 5 | Merlene Frazer | Jamaica | 52.20 | Q |
| 21 | 3 | Fatima Yusuf | Nigeria | 52.25 | Q |
| 22 | 2 | Hana Benešová | Czech Republic | 52.28 | q |
| 23 | 7 | Anna Kozak | Belarus | 52.39 | Q |
| 24 | 5 | Maria Magnolia Figueiredo | Brazil | 52.41 | Q |
| 25 | 7 | Patrizia Spuri | Italy | 52.45 | Q |
| 26 | 5 | Diane Francis | Saint Kitts and Nevis | 52.48 | q |
| 27 | 2 | Yana Manuylova | Ukraine | 52.51 | q |
| 28 | 3 | Lee Naylor | Australia | 52.53 | Q |
| 29 | 6 | Sandra Myers | Spain | 52.54 | Q |
| 30 | 6 | Falilat Ogunkoya | Nigeria | 52.65 | Q |
| 31 | 7 | Zoila Stewart | Costa Rica | 52.66 | |
| 32 | 6 | Donna Fraser | Great Britain | 52.78 | Q |
| 33 | 3 | Olena Rurak | Ukraine | 52.92 | |
| 33 | 5 | Melissa Straker | Barbados | 52.92 | |
| 35 | 6 | Naděžda Koštovalová | Czech Republic | 53.03 | Q |
| 36 | 3 | Marina Živković | FR Yugoslavia | 53.10 | |
| 37 | 1 | Grace Birungi | Uganda | 53.12 | |
| 38 | 6 | Svetlana Bodritskaya | Kazakhstan | 53.24 | |
| 39 | 2 | Ameerah Bello | Virgin Islands | 53.40 | |
| 40 | 7 | Corinne Simasotchi | Switzerland | 53.69 | |
| 41 | 6 | Du Xiujie | China | 53.95 | |
| 42 | 4 | Ngozi Mwanamwambwa | Zambia | 54.12 | |
| 43 | 3 | Melrose Mansaray | Sierra Leone | 54.37 | |
| 44 | 4 | Mercy Addy | Ghana | 54.92 | |
| 45 | 5 | Guilhermina Cruz | Angola | 55.42 | |
| 46 | 7 | Denise Ouabangui | Central African Republic | 55.74 | |
| 47 | 6 | Arely Franco | El Salvador | 1:01:38 | |
| 48 | 1 | Ahamada Haoulata | Comoros | 1:03.44 | |
| | 4 | Ximena Restrepo | Colombia | DNF | |

=== Quarterfinals ===
Qualification: First 4 in each heat (Q) qualified directly to the semifinals.

| Rank | Heat | Name | Nationality | Time | Notes |
|---|---|---|---|---|---|
| 1 | 1 | Cathy Freeman | Australia | 50.43 | Q |
| 2 | 1 | Grit Breuer | Germany | 50.57 | Q |
| 3 | 3 | Falilat Ogunkoya | Nigeria | 50.65 | Q |
| 4 | 3 | Jearl Miles | United States | 50.84 | Q |
| 5 | 1 | Kim Graham | United States | 50.96 | Q |
| 6 | 2 | Marie-José Pérec | France | 51.00 | Q |
| 7 | 1 | Bisi Afolabi | Nigeria | 51.07 | Q |
| 8 | 2 | Pauline Davis | Bahamas | 51.08 | Q |
| 9 | 4 | Maicel Malone | United States | 51.16 | Q |
| 10 | 2 | Juliet Campbell | Jamaica | 51.17 | Q |
| 11 | 3 | Sandie Richards | Jamaica | 51.22 | Q |
| 12 | 4 | Fatima Yusuf | Nigeria | 51.27 | Q |
| 13 | 1 | Hana Benešová | Czech Republic | 51.30 | |
| 14 | 3 | Renee Poetschka | Australia | 51.33 | Q |
| 15 | 2 | Svetlana Goncharenko | Russia | 51.35 | Q |
| 16 | 1 | Olga Kotlyarova | Russia | 51.36 | |
| 17 | 4 | Sandra Myers | Spain | 51.53 | Q |
| 18 | 4 | Merlene Frazer | Jamaica | 51.57 | Q |
| 19 | 1 | Donna Fraser | Great Britain | 51.58 | |
| 20 | 4 | Helena Fuchsová | Czech Republic | 51.70 | |
| 21 | 3 | Virna de Angeli | Italy | 51.77 | |
| 22 | 2 | Maria Magnolia Figueiredo | Brazil | 51.98 | |
| 23 | 2 | Ladonna Antoine | Canada | 52.03 | |
| 24 | 3 | Anna Kozak | Belarus | 52.14 | |
| 25 | 4 | Phylis Smith | Great Britain | 52.16 | |
| 26 | 3 | Diane Francis | Saint Kitts and Nevis | 52.24 | |
| 27 | 1 | Dora Kyriakou | Cyprus | 52.26 | |
| 28 | 2 | Grace-Ann Dinkins | Liberia | 52.53 | |
| 29 | 4 | Patrizia Spuri | Italy | 52.78 | |
| 30 | 2 | Yana Manuylova | Ukraine | 52.82 | |
| 31 | 3 | Naděžda Koštovalová | Czech Republic | 53.21 | |
| 32 | 4 | Lee Naylor | Australia | 53.75 | |

=== Semifinals ===
Qualification: First 4 in each heat (Q) qualified directly to the final.

| Rank | Heat | Name | Nationality | Time | Notes |
|---|---|---|---|---|---|
| 1 | 2 | Marie-José Pérec | France | 49.19 | Q |
| 2 | 2 | Falilat Ogunkoya | Nigeria | 49.57 | Q |
| 3 | 2 | Pauline Davis | Bahamas | 49.85 | Q |
| 4 | 2 | Jearl Miles | United States | 50.21 | Q |
| 5 | 1 | Cathy Freeman | Australia | 50.32 | Q |
| 6 | 1 | Fatima Yusuf | Nigeria | 50.36 | Q |
| 7 | 1 | Sandie Richards | Jamaica | 50.74 | Q |
| 8 | 1 | Grit Breuer | Germany | 50.75 | Q |
| 9 | 2 | Svetlana Goncharenko | Russia | 50.84 | |
| 10 | 1 | Kim Graham | United States | 51.13 | |
| 11 | 1 | Maicel Malone | United States | 51.16 | |
| 12 | 1 | Merlene Frazer | Jamaica | 51.18 | |
| 13 | 1 | Bisi Afolabi | Nigeria | 51.40 | |
| 14 | 2 | Sandra Myers | Spain | 51.42 | |
| 15 | 2 | Renee Poetschka | Australia | 51.49 | |
| 16 | 2 | Juliet Campbell | Jamaica | 51.65 | |

=== Final ===
| Rank | Lane | Name | Nationality | Time | Notes |
|---|---|---|---|---|---|
| 1st place, gold medalist(s) | 3 | Marie-José Pérec | France | 48.25 | |
| 2nd place, silver medalist(s) | 4 | Cathy Freeman | Australia | 48.63 | |
| 3rd place, bronze medalist(s) | 5 | Falilat Ogunkoya | Nigeria | 49.10 | |
| 4 | 2 | Pauline Davis | Bahamas | 49.28 | |
| 5 | 8 | Jearl Miles | United States | 49.55 | |
| 6 | 6 | Fatima Yusuf | Nigeria | 49.77 | |
| 7 | 7 | Sandie Richards | Jamaica | 50.45 | |
| 8 | 1 | Grit Breuer | Germany | 50.71 | |

== See also ==
- Men's 400 metres
