= Athletics at the 1995 Summer Universiade – Women's 4 × 400 metres relay =

The women's 4 × 400 metres relay event at the 1995 Summer Universiade was held on 3 September at the Hakatanomori Athletic Stadium in Fukuoka, Japan.

== Results ==
Rank	Nation	Athletes	Time	Notes
1st place, gold medalist(s)	Russia	Yuliya Sotnikova, Natalya Khrushcheleva, Yelena Andreyeva, Tatyana Chebykina	3:28.32	
2nd place, silver medalist(s)	United States	Nicole Green, Camara Jones, Janeen Jones, Youlanda Warren	3:30.25	
3rd place, bronze medalist(s)	Ukraine	Viktoriya Fomenko, Svetlana Tverdokhleb, Tatyana Movchan, Olena Rurak	3:30.57	
4	Germany	Sandra Kuschmann, Heike Meißner, Mona Steigauf, Uta Rohlander	3:30.97	
5	Nigeria	Omolade Akinremi, Omontayo Akinremi, Amabachukwu Ezem, Olabisi Afolabi	3:33.30	
6	Canada	Nicole Commissiong, France Gareau, Terra Barter, LaDonna Antoine	3:35.46	
7	Japan	Makiko Yamada, Satomi Kasashima, Yuko Tamate, Kazue Kakinuma	3:38.91	
8	Switzerland	Martina Stoop, Patricia Nadler, Bettina Stähli, Celine Jeannet	3:43.86	
