= Yelena Andreyeva =

Russian sprinter

Personal information
- Born: 9 May 1969 (age 57)

Sport
- Sport: Track and field
Medal record
Representing Russia
World Championships
Silver medal – second place	1995 Gothenburg	4×400 m relay
European Championships
Silver medal – second place	1994 Helsinki	4×400 m relay
Summer Universiade
Gold medal – first place	1995 Fukuoka	4x400 m relay

Yelena Leonidovna Andreyeva (Russian: Елена Андреева; born 9 May 1969) is a Russian former track and field sprinter who specialised in the 400 metres. Her personal best for the distance was 51.30 seconds, set in 1994. She was a one-time Russian champion and took relay silver medals with Russia at the 1995 World Championships in Athletics and 1994 European Athletics Championships.

== Career ==
Her career at the top level of athletics lasted only two years. She rose to prominence at age twenty-five, winning the 400 m title at the Russian Athletics Championships. This was the sole national title of her career, although her winning time of 51.61 seconds was the slowest ever time to merit the title.

She made her international debut at the Goodwill Games in Saint Petersburg that year, running a lifetime best of 51.30 seconds to take fifth in the 400 m before securing a 4×400 metres relay silver medal behind the United States with the Russian team of Yelena Golesheva, Yelena Ruzina, and Tatyana Zakharova. At the 1994 European Athletics Championships she was the fastest 400 m qualifier in the heats and reached the final, where she missed out on the bronze medal in fourth, beaten by Phylis Smith of Great Britain. Another relay silver medal came for her, running alongside Natalya Khrushchelyova, Zakharova and Svetlana Goncharenko, but they were some way behind the French winning team.

In her second and last year of international competition she first competed at the 1995 Summer Universiade. She repeated her European performance, topping the heats round but ending the final in fourth, this time beaten by Ukrainian rival Olena Rurak. Her first international title followed in the 4×400 m relay, as she, Yuliya Sotnikova, Khrushcheleva, and Tatyana Chebykina topped the podium. Andreyeva's final outing proved to be her highest honour as she ran the anchor leg for the Russian women's relay team of Chebykina, Goncharenko, and Sotnikova to earn the silver medal at the 1995 World Championships in Athletics (again runner-up to perennial rivals the United States).

Andreyeva did not compete internationally after 1995, although she ran at national level until 2003.

== National titles ==
- Russian Athletics Championships
  - 400 metres: 1994

== International competitions ==
Year	Competition	Venue	Position	Event	Notes
Representing Russia
1994	Goodwill Games	Saint Petersburg, Russia	5th	400 m	51.30 PB
1994	Goodwill Games	Saint Petersburg, Russia	2nd	4 × 400 m relay	3:25.00
1994	European Championships	Helsinki, Finland	4th	400 m	51.65
1994	European Championships	Helsinki, Finland	2nd	4 × 400 m relay	3:24.06
1995	Universiade	Fukuoka, Japan	4th	400 m	51.85
1995	Universiade	Fukuoka, Japan	1st	4 × 400 m relay	3:28.32
1995	World Championships	Gothenburg, Sweden	2nd	4 × 400 m relay	3:23.98
