= 1995 World Championships in Athletics – Women's 4 × 400 metres relay =

These are the results of the women's 4 × 400 metres relay event at the 1995 World Championships in Athletics in Gothenburg, Sweden.

== Medalists ==
| Gold | Silver | Bronze |
|---|---|---|
| United States; Kim Graham; Rochelle Stevens; Camara Jones; Jearl Miles Clark; Nicole Green* | Russia; Tatyana Chebykina; Svetlana Goncharenko; Yuliya Sotnikova; Yelena Andreyeva; Tatyana Zakharova* | Australia; Lee Naylor; Renee Poetschka; Melinda Gainsford-Taylor; Cathy Freeman |

* Runners who participated in the heats only and received medals.

== Results ==
=== Heats ===
Qualification: First 3 of each heat (Q) plus the 2 fastest times (q) advance to the final.

| Rank | Heat | Nation | Athletes | Time | Notes |
|---|---|---|---|---|---|
| 1 | 1 | Russia | Tatyana Chebykina, Svetlana Goncharenko, Tatyana Zakharova, Yelena Andreyeva | 3:22.24 | Q |
| 2 | 2 | United States | Kim Graham, Rochelle Stevens, Nicole Green, Camara Jones | 3:23.29 | Q |
| 3 | 2 | Jamaica | Claudine Williams, Merlene Frazer, Revoli Campbell, Sandie Richards | 3:23.29 | Q |
| 4 | 2 | Germany | Linda Kisabaka, Karin Janke, Sandra Kuschmann, Uta Rohländer | 3:23.84 | Q |
| 5 | 2 | Nigeria | Falilat Ogunkoya, Olabisi Afolabi, Omolade Akinremi, Fatima Yusuf | 3:25.42 | q |
| 6 | 2 | Great Britain | Melanie Neef, Stephanie Llewellyn, Lorraine Hanson, Georgina Oladapo | 3:25.50 | q |
| 7 | 1 | Australia | Lee Naylor, Renee Poetschka, Melinda Gainsford-Taylor, Cathy Freeman | 3:26.08 | Q |
| 8 | 2 | Czech Republic | Naděžda Koštovalová, Hana Benešová, Ludmila Formanová, Helena Dziurová-Fuchsová | 3:26.27 | |
| 9 | 1 | Cuba | Surella Morales, Nancy McLeón, Idalmis Bonne, Julia Duporty | 3:26.32 | Q |
| 10 | 1 | Ukraine | Viktoriya Fomenko, Olga Moroz, Irina Lenskaya, Yelena Rurak | 3:26.43 | |
| 11 | 1 | France | Marie-Louise Bévis, Viviane Dorsile-El Haddad, Evelyne Elien, Marie-José Pérec | 3:27.11 | |
| 12 | 2 | Italy | Francesca Carbone, Patrizia Spuri, Danielle Perpoli, Virna de Angeli | 3:30.88 | |
| 13 | 1 | Spain | Esther Lahoz, Sandra Myers, Miriam Bravo, Yolanda Reyes | 3:31.71 | |
| —N/a | 1 | Colombia | Patricia Rodríguez, Elia Mera, Mirtha Brock, Norfalia Carabalí | DNF | |

=== Final ===
| Rank | Nation | Athletes | Time | Notes |
|---|---|---|---|---|
| 1st place, gold medalist(s) | United States | Kim Graham, Rochelle Stevens, Camara Jones, Jearl Miles Clark | 3:22.39 | |
| 2nd place, silver medalist(s) | Russia | Tatyana Chebykina, Svetlana Goncharenko, Yuliya Sotnikova, Yelena Andreyeva | 3:23.98 | |
| 3rd place, bronze medalist(s) | Australia | Lee Naylor, Renee Poetschka, Melinda Gainsford-Taylor, Cathy Freeman | 3:25.88 | |
| 4 | Germany | Karin Janke, Silke-Beate Knoll, Linda Kisabaka, Uta Rohländer | 3:26.10 | |
| 5 | Great Britain | Melanie Neef, Stephanie Llewellyn, Lorraine Hanson, Georgina Oladapo | 3:26.89 | |
| 6 | Nigeria | Olabisi Afolabi, Falilat Ogunkoya, Omolade Akinremi, Fatima Yusuf | 3:27.85 | |
| 7 | Cuba | Idalmis Bonne, Ana Fidelia Quirot, Nancy McLeón, Julia Duporty | 3:29.27 | |
| —N/a | Jamaica | Revoli Campbell, Merlene Frazer, Sandie Richards, Deon Hemmings | DQ | |
