= 1996 European Athletics Indoor Championships – Women's 400 metres =

The women's 400 metres event at the 1996 European Athletics Indoor Championships was held in Stockholm Globe Arena on 8–9 March.

== Medalists ==
Gold	Silver	Bronze
Grit Breuer; Germany	Olga Kotlyarova; Russia	Tatyana Chebykina; Russia

== Results ==
=== Heats ===
The first 2 from each heat (Q) and the next 2 fastest (q) qualified for the semifinals.

Rank	Heat	Name	Nationality	Time	Notes
1	5	Grit Breuer	Germany	52.55	Q
2	5	Virna De Angeli	Italy	53.08	Q
3	2	Olga Kotlyarova	Russia	53.09	Q
4	1	Helena Fuchsová	Czech Republic	53.19	Q
5	2	Hana Benešová	Czech Republic	53.29	Q
6	3	Ionela Târlea	Romania	53.49	Q
7	4	Tatyana Chebykina	Russia	53.54	Q
8	3	Naděžda Koštovalová	Czech Republic	53.64	Q
9	4	Öznur Dursun	Turkey	53.78	Q
10	2	Marina Živković	Yugoslavia	53.89	q
11	3	Emma Nicholson	Ireland	54.13	q
12	5	Dora Kyriacou	Cyprus	54.52	q
13	5	Žana Minina	Lithuania	55.40	
	1	Brigita Langerholc	Slovenia	DQ	
	1	Marie-Louise Bévis	France	DQ	
	4	Yana Manuylova	Ukraine	DQ	

=== Semifinals ===
The winner of each semifinal (Q) and the next 1 fastest (q) qualified for the final. The subsequent 4 fastest qualified for the B final.

Rank	Heat	Name	Nationality	Time	Notes
1	2	Grit Breuer	Germany	51.33	Q
2	2	Tatyana Chebykina	Russia	52.03	q
3	3	Olga Kotlyarova	Russia	52.29	Q
4	1	Ionela Târlea	Romania	52.30	Q
5	1	Helena Fuchsová	Czech Republic	52.35	qB
6	3	Virna De Angeli	Italy	52.35	qB
7	3	Naděžda Koštovalová	Czech Republic	52.35	qB
8	2	Hana Benešová	Czech Republic	52.75	qB
9	2	Dora Kyriacou	Cyprus	53.47	
10	3	Emma Nicholson	Ireland	53.63	
11	1	Marina Živković	Yugoslavia	53.85	
12	1	Öznur Dursun	Turkey	53.91	

=== Final ===
Rank	Name	Nationality	Time	Notes
1st place, gold medalist(s)	Grit Breuer	Germany	50.81	
2nd place, silver medalist(s)	Olga Kotlyarova	Russia	51.70	
3rd place, bronze medalist(s)	Tatyana Chebykina	Russia	51.71	
4	Ionela Târlea	Romania	52.90	

==== B final ====
Rank	Name	Nationality	Time	Notes
1	Virna De Angeli	Italy	52.17	NR
2	Hana Benešová	Czech Republic	52.23	
3	Helena Fuchsová	Czech Republic	52.37	
4	Naděžda Koštovalová	Czech Republic	53.02	
