= 1993 World Championships in Athletics – Women's 4 × 400 metres relay =

These are the official results of the Women's 4 × 400 metres event at the 1993 IAAF World Championships in Stuttgart, Germany. Their final was held on Sunday 1993-08-22.

== Final ==
RANK	NATION	ATHLETES	TIME
	United States (USA)	• Gwen Torrence • Maicel Malone • Natasha Kaiser-Brown • Jearl Miles	3:16.71 (CR)
	Russia (RUS)	• Yelena Ruzina • Tatyana Alekseyeva • Margarita Ponomaryova • Irina Privalova	3:18.38
	Great Britain (GBR)	• Linda Keough • Phylis Smith • Tracy Goddard • Sally Gunnell	3:23.41
4.	Jamaica (JAM)	• Deon Hemmings • Inez Turner • Juliet Campbell • Sandie Richards	3:23.83
5.	Germany (GER)	• Heike Meißner • Sandra Seuser • Anja Rücker • Linda Kisabaka	3:25.49
6.	France (FRA)	• Elsa Devassoigne • Evelyne Elien • Francine Landre • Marie-Louise Bévis	3:27.08
7.	Czech Republic (CZE)	• Naděžda Koštovalová • Helena Fuchsová • Hana Benešová • Ludmila Formanová	3:27.94
8.	Switzerland (SUI)	• Helen Burkart • Regula Zürcher • Marquita Brillante • Kathrin Lüthi	3:28.52

== Heats ==
- Held on Saturday 1993-08-21

=== Heat 1 ===
RANK	NATION	ATHLETES	TIME
1.	Jamaica (JAM)	• Beverly Grant • Inez Turner • Deon Hemmings • Sandie Richards	3:23.82
2.	Russia (RUS)	• Yelena Golesheva-Scheers • Yelena Ruzina • Vera Sychugova • Tatyana Alekseyeva	3:24.67
3.	Czech Republic (CZE)	• Naděžda Koštovalová • Helena Fuchsová • Hana Benešová • Ludmila Formanová	3:29.25
4.	Switzerland (SUI)	• Marquita Brillante • Regula Zürcher • Helen Burkart • Kathrin Luthi	3:29.67
5.	Ukraine (UKR)	• Olga Lisakova • Aelita Yurchenko • Yelena Nasonkina • Yelena Storchovaya	3:30.37
–	Cuba (CUB)	• Lency Montelier • Julia Duporty • Idalmis Bonne • Odalmis Limonta	DNF
–	Canada (CAN)		DNS

=== Heat 2 ===
RANK	NATION	ATHLETES	TIME
1.	United States (USA)	• Terri Dendy • Michele Collins • Maicel Malone • Natasha Kaiser-Brown	3:24.08
2.	Great Britain (GBR)	• Linda Keough • Phylis Smith • Tracy Goddard • Sally Gunnell	3:27.04
3.	Germany (GER)	• Heike Meißner • Sandra Seuser • Anja Rücker • Linda Kisabaka	3:27.44
4.	France (FRA)	• Elsa Devassoigne • Evelyne Elien • Francine Landre • Marie-Louise Bévis	3:28.62
5.	Nigeria (NGR)	• Omolade Akinremi • Omotayo Akinremi • Olabisi Afolabi • Emily Odoemenam	3:33.12
6.	Portugal (POR)	• Marta Moreira • Elsa Amaral • Cristina Regalo • Natalia Moura	3:34.76
7.	Spain (ESP)	• Blanca Lacambra • Esther Lahoz • Yolanda Reyes • Miriam Alonso	3:38.61

== See also ==
- 1988 Women's Olympic 4 × 400 m Relay (Seoul)
- 1990 Women's European Championships 4 × 400 m Relay (Split)
- 1991 Women's World Championships 4 × 400 m Relay (Tokyo)
- 1992 Women's Olympic 4 × 400 m Relay (Barcelona)
- 1994 Women's European Championships 4 × 400 m Relay (Helsinki)
- 1995 Women's World Championships 4 × 400 m Relay (Gothenburg)

== Sources ==
- Results
