= Rurak =

Rurak is a surname. Notable people with the surname include:

- Kostyantyn Rurak (born 1974), Ukrainian sprinter
- Olena Rurak (born 1972), Ukrainian sprinter
