= Phyllis Smith (disambiguation) =

Phyllis Smith (born 1949) is an American actress.

Phyllis Smith or Phylis Smith may also refer to:

- Phyllis Curtin (1921–2016), née Phyllis Smith, American classical soprano
- Phylis Smith (born 1965), British Olympic sprinter and bronze medallist
