= 1994 European Athletics Championships – Women's 400 metres =

Women's 400 metres at the European Athletics Championships
- Venue: Helsinki Olympic Stadium
- Location: Helsinki, Finland
- Dates: 8, 9, and 11 August 1994
- Competitors: 24 from 14 nations
- Winning time: 50.33 s

Medalists
gold medal	Marie-José Pérec	France
silver medal	Svetlana Goncharenko	Russia
bronze medal	Phylis Smith	United Kingdom

The women's 400 metres event at the 1994 European Athletics Championships was held in Helsinki, Finland, at Helsinki Olympic Stadium on 8, 9, and 11 August 1994.

== Results ==
=== Heats ===
8 August

==== Heat 1 ====
Rank	Name	Nationality	Time	Notes
1	Phylis Smith	United Kingdom	51.87	Q
2	Marie-José Pérec	France	51.87	Q
3	Daniela Spasova	Bulgaria	52.56	Q
4	Charlotta Johansson	Sweden	52.91	Q
5	Tatyana Zakharova	Russia	53.18	q
6	Elżbieta Kilińska	Poland	53.19	
7	Tamara Kupriyanovich	Belarus	53.42	
8	Dora Kyriacou	Cyprus	53.75	

==== Heat 2 ====
Rank	Name	Nationality	Time	Notes
1	Yelena Andreyeva	Russia	51.73	Q
2	Sandra Myers	Spain	51.93	Q
3	Melanie Neef	United Kingdom	52.44	Q
4	Évelyne Élien	France	52.54	Q
5	Nadezda Kostovalová	Czech Republic	52.75	q
6	Uta Rohländer	Germany	53.30	
7	Heidi Suomi	Finland	53.50	
8	Patrizia Spuri	Italy	54.35	

==== Heat 3 ====
Rank	Name	Nationality	Time	Notes
1	Francine Landre	France	51.92	Q
2	Svetlana Goncharenko	Russia	51.56	Q
3	Anja Rücker	Germany	52.09	Q
4	Sølvi Meinseth	Norway	52.49	Q
5	Hana Benešová	Czech Republic	52.87	q
6	Linda Keough	United Kingdom	52.95	q
7	Danielle Perpoli	Italy	53.81	
8	Anna Kozak	Belarus	53.83	

=== Semi-finals ===
9 August

==== Semi-final 1 ====
Rank	Name	Nationality	Time	Notes
1	Marie-José Pérec	France	51.96	Q
2	Yelena Andreyeva	Russia	52.36	Q
3	Daniela Spasova	Bulgaria	52.43	Q
4	Melanie Neef	United Kingdom	52.55	Q
5	Charlotta Johansson	Sweden	52.89	
6	Linda Keough	United Kingdom	53.63	
7	Nadezda Kostovalová	Czech Republic	53.75	
	Sandra Myers	Spain	DNF	

==== Semi-final 2 ====
Rank	Name	Nationality	Time	Notes
1	Svetlana Goncharenko	Russia	51.84	Q
2	Anja Rücker	Germany	51.84	Q
3	Phylis Smith	United Kingdom	51.90	Q
4	Francine Landre	France	51.92	Q
5	Sølvi Meinseth	Norway	52.60	
6	Tatyana Zakharova	Russia	52.99	
7	Évelyne Élien	France	53.05	
8	Hana Benešová	Czech Republic	53.66	

=== Final ===
11 August

Rank	Name	Nationality	Time	Notes
1st place, gold medalist(s)	Marie-José Pérec	France	50.33	
2nd place, silver medalist(s)	Svetlana Goncharenko	Russia	51.24	
3rd place, bronze medalist(s)	Phylis Smith	United Kingdom	51.30	
4	Yelena Andreyeva	Russia	51.65	
5	Anja Rücker	Germany	51.85	
6	Melanie Neef	United Kingdom	52.10	
7	Daniela Spasova	Bulgaria	52.25	
8	Francine Landre	France	52.57	
