= Anja Knippel =

German middle-distance runner

Personal information
- Full name: Anja Knippel
- Born: 19 August 1974 (age 52) Schmalkalden, East Germany
- Height: 1.66 m (5 ft 5 in)

Sport
- Country: Germany
- Sport: Athletics
- Event: 800 metres

Achievements and titles
- Personal bests: 800 metres: 2:00.11 (Cuxhaven; July 2002)

Anja Knippel (born 19 August 1974) is a retired German runner who specialised in the 800 metres. She was born in Schmalkalden.

At the 1999 World Indoor Championships she finished fourth in the 4 × 400 metres relay, together with teammates Anja Rücker, Ulrike Urbansky and Grit Breuer. At the 1999 World Championships she ran in the heats for the German team, helping to qualify for the final.

Her personal best time is 2:00.11 minutes, achieved in July 2002 in Cuxhaven.
