= 1999 World Championships in Athletics – Women's 4 × 400 metres relay =

The Women's 4 × 400 metres relay event at the 1999 World Championships in Athletics was held at the Estadio Olímpico de Sevilla on August 28 and August 29.

== Medals ==
Gold	Silver	Bronze
Russia; Tatyana Chebykina; Svetlana Goncharenko; Olga Kotlyarova; Natalya Nazarova	United States; Suziann Reid; Maicel Malone-Wallace; Michelle Collins; Jearl Miles Clark	Germany; Anke Feller; Uta Rohländer-Fromm; Anja Rücker; Grit Breuer

== Results ==
=== Heats ===
All times shown are in minutes.

AR area record | CR championship record | GR games record | NR national record | OR Olympic record | PB personal best | SB season best | WL world leading (in a given season)
DNS = did not start | DQ = disqualification | NM = no mark (i.e. no valid result) | Q = qualification by place in heat | q = qualification by overall place

==== Heat 1 ====
1. Russia (Natalya Sharova, Yekaterina Bakhvalova, Tatyana Chebykina, Svetlana Goncharenko) 3:24.51 Q (WL)
2. Australia (Tamsyn Lewis, Lee Naylor, Susan Andrews, Cathy Freeman) 3:27.31 Q
3. Cuba (Julia Duporty, Zulia Calatayud, Yudalis Díaz, Idalmis Bonne) 3:27.54 q
4. Canada (Karlene Haughton, LaDonna Antoine-Watkins, Candice Jones, Foy Williams) 3:28.47 (SB)
5. Senegal (Aïda Diop, Mame Tacko Diouf, Aminata Diouf, Amy Mbacké Thiam) 3:30.99 (NR)
6. Spain (Elena Córcoles, Yolanda Reyes, Miriam Bravo, Lisette Ferri) 3:36.28

==== Heat 2 ====
1. Germany (Anke Feller, Uta Rohländer-Fromm, Anja Knippel, Anja Rücker) 3:24.80 Q (SB)
2. Czech Republic (Jitka Burianová, Hana Benešová, Ludmila Formanová, Helena Fuchsová) 3:25.58 Q (SB)
3. Jamaica (Beverly Grant, Charmaine Howell, Tracey Barnes, Claudine Williams) 3:27.78 q (SB)
4. Great Britain (Donna Fraser, Helen Frost, Michelle Thomas, Sinead Dudgeon) 3:27.99 (SB)
5. Cameroon (Mireille Nguimgo, Myriam Léonie Mani, Stéphanie Nicole Zanga, Claudine Komgang) 3:33.51 (NR)
6. Liberia (Jocelyn Harris, Grace Dinkins, Joetta Dweh, Hannah Cooper) 3:55.30 (NR)

==== Heat 3 ====
1. United States (Suziann Reid, Maicel Malone-Wallace, Andrea Anderson, Michelle Collins) 3:25.10 Q (SB)
2. Italy (Danielle Perpoli, Patrizia Spuri, Monika Niederstätter, Virna De Angeli) 3:31.67 Q
3. Barbados (Andrea Blackett, Melissa Straker, Lucy-Ann Richards, Joanne Durant) 3:34.37
4. India (M. K. Asha, K. Mathews Beenamol, Rosa Kutty, Jincy Phillip) 3:36.54
  - Nigeria (Falilat Ogunkoya, Charity Opara, Olabisi Afolabi, Mabel Madojemu) DNS
  - Romania (Otilia Ruicu-Esanu, Ionela Târlea, Andrea Burlacu, Ana Maria Barbu) DNS

=== Final ===
Rank	Nation	Athletes	Time	Notes
1st place, gold medalist(s)	Russia	Tatyana Chebykina, Svetlana Goncharenko, Olga Kotlyarova, Natalya Nazarova	3:21.98	WL
2nd place, silver medalist(s)	United States	Suziann Reid, Maicel Malone-Wallace, Michelle Collins, Jearl Miles Clark	3:22.09	SB
3rd place, bronze medalist(s)	Germany	Anke Feller, Uta Rohländer-Fromm, Anja Rücker, Grit Breuer	3:22.43	SB
4	Czech Republic	Jitka Burianová, Hana Benešová, Ludmila Formanová, Helena Fuchsová	3:23.82	SB
5	Jamaica	Beverly Grant, Lorraine Fenton, Claudine Williams, Deon Hemmings	3:24.83	SB
6	Australia	Tania Van Heer, Lee Naylor, Susan Andrews, Cathy Freeman	3:28.04	
7	Cuba	Julia Duporty, Zulia Calatayud, Yudalis Díaz, Idalmis Bonne	3:29.19	
8	Italy	Virna De Angeli, Patrizia Spuri, Francesca Carbone, Monika Niederstätter	3:29.56	
