= Athletics at the 1981 Summer Universiade – Women's 400 metres =

The women's 400 metres event at the 1981 Summer Universiade was held at the Stadionul Naţional in Bucharest on 23 and 24 July 1981.

== Medalists ==
Gold	Silver	Bronze
Irina Baskakova; Soviet Union	Nadezhda Lyalina; Soviet Union	Sophie Malbranque; France

== Results ==
=== Heats ===
Rank	Heat	Athlete	Nationality	Time	Notes
1	2	Nadezhda Lyalina	Soviet Union	52.45	Q
2	3	Irina Baskakova	Soviet Union	52.46	Q
3	3	Sophie Malbranque	France	52.76	Q
4	2	Elena Tărîță	Romania	52.80	Q
5	3	Delisa Walton	United States	52.89	q
6	2	Judit Forgács	Hungary	53.34	q
7	1	Tânia Miranda	Brazil	53.43	Q
8	1	Marie-Christine Champenois	France	53.54	Q
9	3	Ibolya Petrika	Hungary	53.62	
10	1	Niculina Lazarciuc	Romania	53.65	
11	2	Erika Rossi	Italy	53.68	
12	2	Leanne Evans	Australia	54.41	
13	1	Andrea Decker	West Germany	54.95	
14	3	Heather Wright	Australia	55.51	
15	2	Georgia Troubouki	Greece	55.88	
16	1	Gloria Ayanlaja	Nigeria	58.28	
17	2	Hala El-Moughrabi	Syria	59.61	
18	2	Long Pham Kieu	Vietnam	1:01.06	
19	3	Reine Bejjani	Lebanon	1:07.31	

=== Final ===
Rank	Athlete	Nationality	Time	Notes
1st place, gold medalist(s)	Irina Baskakova	Soviet Union	51.45	
2nd place, silver medalist(s)	Nadezhda Lyalina	Soviet Union	51.56	
3rd place, bronze medalist(s)	Sophie Malbranque	France	52.52	
4	Judit Forgács	Hungary	52.61	
5	Delisa Walton	United States	52.97	
6	Tânia Miranda	Brazil	53.19	
7	Elena Tărîță	Romania	53.53	
8	Marie-Christine Champenois	France	53.53	
