= Melanie Neef =

British sprinter

Personal information
- Nationality: British (Scottish)
- Born: 26 May 1970 (age 56) Glasgow, Scotland

Sport
- Sport: Athletics
- Event: 400m
Medal record
Representing Great Britain
Athletics
IAAF World Cup
Gold medal – first place	1994 London	4 × 400 m relay
Summer Universiade
Silver medal – second place	1991 Sheffield	4 × 100 m relay

Melanie Neef (born 26 May 1970) is a British former track and field sprinter who specialised in the 400 metres. She represented her country at the 1995 World Championships in Athletics and 1995 IAAF World Indoor Championships. She set her lifetime best of 51.18 seconds at the outdoor event.

== Biography ==
Born in Scotland to German footballer Gerhardt Neef, who was playing for Rangers F.C., she became involved in athletics with the City of Glasgow AC. Her first international medal came at the 1991 Summer Universiade where she was runner-up with the British women's 4 × 100 metres relay team. She won senior gold medals with the 4 × 400 metres relay team at the 1994 European Cup and 1994 IAAF World Cup, as well as a fourth place at the 1994 European Athletics Championships.

Neef took an individual silver medal at the 1994 European Cup behind Russia's Svetlana Goncharenko and returned the following year to win gold. She was a finalist individually at the 1994 European Championships and came sixth for Scotland at the 1994 Commonwealth Games. Her last individual international outing was at the 1995 World Championships in Athletics, where she was fourth in her semi-final.

She was a four-time British 400 metres champion during her brief career, taking 400 m title outdoors at the AAA Championships in 1994 and 1995, and the national indoor title at the AAA Indoor Championships in 1995 and 1996.

== International competitions ==
Year	Competition	Venue	Position	Event	Notes
1991	Universiade	Sheffield, United Kingdom	10th (sf)	100 m	11.88
1991	Universiade	Sheffield, United Kingdom	9th (sf)	200 m	24.14
1991	Universiade	Sheffield, United Kingdom	2nd	4 × 100 m relay	44.97
1993	Universiade	Buffalo, United States	26th (h)	100 m	12.39
1993	Universiade	Buffalo, United States	16th (sf)	200 m	24.00
1993	Universiade	Buffalo, United States	–	4 × 100 m relay	DNF
1994	European Cup	Birmingham, United Kingdom	2nd	400 m	52.43
1994	European Cup	Birmingham, United Kingdom	1st	4 × 400 m relay	3:27.33
1994	Commonwealth Games	Victoria, Canada	6th	400 m	52.09
1994	European Championships	Helsinki, Finland	6th	400 m	52.10
1994	European Championships	Helsinki, Finland	4th	4 × 400 m relay	3:24.14
1994	World Cup	London, United Kingdom	1st	4 × 400 m relay	3:27.36
1995	World Indoor Championships	Barcelona, Spain	4th (h)	400 m	53.34
1995	World Indoor Championships	Barcelona, Spain	4th	4 × 400 m relay	3:35.39
1995	European Cup	Villeneuve d'Ascq, France	1st	400 m	51.35
1995	World Championships	Gothenburg, Sweden	4th (semis)	400 m	51.18
1995	World Championships	Gothenburg, Sweden	5th	4 × 400 m relay	3:26.89

== National titles ==
- AAA Championships
  - 400 m: 1994, 1995
- AAA Indoor Championships
  - 400 m: 1995, 1996
