= Steve Day =

British deaf stand-up comedian

Day in 2018

Steve Day is a British deaf stand-up comedian.

== Stand-up comedy ==
Day was a finalist in the Daily Telegraph Open Mic Award in 2000, and a finalist in the Hackney Empire New Act of the Year in 2002.

Day has had several one-man shows at the Edinburgh Festival Fringe: "Deaf in the Afternoon" (2002), "A Night at the Pictures" (2005), "Comprehensive Steve Day" (2006), "A Night at the Pictures (2007), Should I Stay or Should I Go? (2008)", and "Run, deaf Boy, Run" (2011).

In 2005, Day performed as part of "Abnormally Funny People", with Steve Best, Liz Carr, Tanyalee Davis, Chris McCausland and Simon Minty. He still makes occasional performances as part of the group, most recently a promotional video for the Disability Rights Commission. He tours extensively around the UK.

== Radio ==
Day has appeared on and written for several BBC Radio 4 shows.

== Personal life ==
Day lives in Sutton Coldfield, West Midlands. He has three children and two step-children with his wife, former Olympic athlete, Georgina Oladapo Day.
