= Dora Kyriakou =

Cypriot sprinter (born 1967)

Personal information
- Born: 3 July 1967 (age 58)
- Height: 1.67 m (5 ft 6 in)
- Weight: 60 kg (132 lb)

Sport
- Sport: Track and field
- Event(s): 200 metres, 400 metres

Theodora "Dora" Kyriakou (Greek: Θεοδώρα "Δώρα" Κυριάκου; born 3 July 1967) is a retired Cypriot sprinter who competed primarily in the 200 and 400 metres. She represented her country at the 1996 Summer Olympics as well as three consecutive World Championships starting in 1993. In addition, she won the silver medal in the 400 metres at the 1997 Mediterranean Games setting a new national record of 52.02 seconds.

== Competition record ==
Year	Competition	Venue	Position	Event	Notes
Representing Cyprus
1985	Games of the Small States of Europe	Serravalle, San Marino	2nd	200 m	24.87
1985	Games of the Small States of Europe	Serravalle, San Marino	1st	200 m	55.45
1985	Games of the Small States of Europe	Serravalle, San Marino	1st	4 × 100 m relay	48.26
1991	Games of the Small States of Europe	Andorra la Vella, Andorra	1st	4 × 400 m relay	3:56.75
1993	Games of the Small States of Europe	Valletta, Malta	1st	200 m	24.47
1993	Games of the Small States of Europe	Valletta, Malta	1st	400 m	54.55
1993	Games of the Small States of Europe	Valletta, Malta	1st	4 × 400 m relay	3:52.62
1993	Mediterranean Games	Narbonne, France	7th	400 m	55.36
1993	Mediterranean Games	Narbonne, France	4th	4 × 100 m relay	48.27
1993	World Championships	Stuttgart, Germany	32nd (h)	200 m	24.47
1993	World Championships	Stuttgart, Germany	23rd (h)	400 m	54.49
1994	European Championships	Helsinki, Finland	21st (h)	200 m	53.75
1994	European Championships	Helsinki, Finland	23rd (h)	400 m	53.75
1994	Commonwealth Games	Victoria, Canada	20th (h)	200 m	23.83
1994	Commonwealth Games	Victoria, Canada	11th (sf)	400 m	53.80
1995	World Indoor Championships	Barcelona, Spain	13th (h)	400 m	53.46
1995	World Championships	Gothenburg, Sweden	31st (h)	200 m	23.77
1995	World Championships	Gothenburg, Sweden	35th (h)	400 m	52.81
1996	European Indoor Championships	Stockholm, Sweden	9th (sf)	400 m	53.47
1996	Olympic Games	Atlanta, United States	39th (h)	200 m	23.85
1996	Olympic Games	Atlanta, United States	27th (qf)	400 m	52.26
1997	Mediterranean Games	Bari, Italy	2nd	400 m	52.02
1997	World Championships	Athens, Greece	44th (h)	200 m	24.08
1998	European Championships	Budapest, Hungary	–	400 m	DNF
1998	Commonwealth Games	Kuala Lumpur, Malaysia	16th (sf)	400 m	54.04
2001	Mediterranean Games	Radès, Tunisia	5th	4 × 400 m relay	3:43.20
2002	Commonwealth Games	Manchester, United Kingdom	25th (h)	400 m	56.13
2002	Commonwealth Games	Manchester, United Kingdom	9th (h)	4 × 400 m relay	3:46.27
2003	Games of the Small States of Europe	Marsa, Malta	1st	4 × 400 m relay	3:44.48

== Personal bests ==
Outdoor

- 200 metres – 23.52 (Pátra 1995)
- 400 metres – 52.02 (Bari 1997)

Indoor

- 400 metres – 53.14 (Pireás 1995)
