= 1987 European Athletics Indoor Championships – Women's 400 metres =

The women's 400 metres event at the 1987 European Athletics Indoor Championships was held on 21 and 22 February.

== Medalists ==
Gold	Silver	Bronze
Mariya Pinigina; Soviet Union	Gisela Kinzel; West Germany	Cristina Pérez; Spain

== Results ==
=== Heats ===
First 2 from each heat (Q) and the next 2 fastest (q) qualified for the final.

Rank	Heat	Name	Nationality	Time	Notes
1	1	Mariya Pinigina	Soviet Union	52.09	Q
2	1	Helga Arendt	West Germany	52.61	Q
3	1	Judit Forgács	Hungary	52.61	q, NR
4	2	Gisela Kinzel	West Germany	52.76	Q
5	2	Marzena Wojdecka	Poland	52.77	Q, NR
6	1	Cristina Pérez	Spain	52.83	q, NR
7	2	Rositsa Stamenova	Bulgaria	53.18	
8	1	Fabienne Ficher	France	53.86	
9	2	Gerda Haas	Austria	53.89	NR
10	2	Nathalie Simon	France	54.22	
11	1	Semra Aksu	Turkey	55.17	
	2	Ann-Louise Skoglund	Sweden	DNS	

=== Final ===
Rank	Name	Nationality	Time	Notes
1st place, gold medalist(s)	Mariya Pinigina	Soviet Union	51.27	
2nd place, silver medalist(s)	Gisela Kinzel	West Germany	52.29	
3rd place, bronze medalist(s)	Cristina Pérez	Spain	52.63	NR
4	Helga Arendt	West Germany	52.64	
5	Judit Forgács	Hungary	52.87	
6	Marzena Wojdecka	Poland	52.97	
