= Gloria Burgos =

Bolivian sprinter

Personal information
- Nationality: Bolivian
- Born: 28 January 1970 (age 55)

Sport
- Sport: Sprinting
- Event: 4 × 400 metres relay

Gloria Amparo Burgos Panoso (born 28 January 1970) is a Bolivian sprinter. She competed in the women's 4 × 400 metres relay at the 1992 Summer Olympics.
