= Naděžda Koštovalová =

Czech runner

Personal information
- Born: 10 September 1971 (age 55) Tábor, Czechoslovakia

Sport
- Sport: Track and field
Medal record
Representing Czech Republic
World Indoor Championships
Silver medal – second place	1995 Barcelona	4x400m relay

Naděžda Koštovalová (née Tomšová; born 10 September 1971) is a retired Czech athlete who specialised in the 400 metres. She won a silver medal in the 4 x 400 metres relay at the 1995 World Indoor Championships. In addition, she represented her country at the 1996 Summer Olympics, as well as three outdoor World Championships.

Her personal best in the event is 51.84 seconds outdoors (Ostrava 1996) and 52.70 seconds indoors (Vienna 1995).

== Competition record ==
Year	Competition	Venue	Position	Event	Notes
Representing Czechoslovakia
1988	World Junior Championships	Sudbury, Canada	7th	400 m	54.21
1989	European Junior Championships	Varaždin, Yugoslavia	13th (sf)	400 m	55.07
1989	European Junior Championships	Varaždin, Yugoslavia	6th	4 × 100 m relay	46.60
Representing Czech Republic
1993	World Championships	Stuttgart, Germany	17th (h)	400 m	52.69
1993	World Championships	Stuttgart, Germany	7th	4 × 400 m relay	3:27.94
1994	European Indoor Championships	Paris, France	8th (h)	400 m	53.71
1994	European Championships	Helsinki, Finland	15th (sf)	400 m	53.75
1994	European Championships	Helsinki, Finland	5th	4 × 400 m relay	3:27.95
1995	World Indoor Championships	Barcelona, Spain	10th (sf)	400 m	53.38
1995	World Indoor Championships	Barcelona, Spain	2nd	4 × 400 m relay	3:30.27
1995	World Championships	Gothenburg, Sweden	8th (h)	4 × 400 m relay	3:26.27
1995	Universiade	Fukuoka, Japan	6th	400 m	52.08
1996	European Indoor Championships	Stockholm, Sweden	4th (B)	400 m	53.02
1996	Olympic Games	Athens, Greece	33rd (qf)	400 m	53.21
1996	Olympic Games	Athens, Greece	7th	4 × 400 m relay	3:26.99
1997	World Indoor Championships	Paris, France	4th	4 × 400 m relay	3:28.47
1997	World Championships	Athens, Greece	21st (sf)	400 m	52.61
1997	World Championships	Athens, Greece	5th	4 × 400 m relay	3:23.73
1997	Universiade	Catania, Italy	4th	400 m	52.32
