= Eduarda Coelho =

Portuguese sprinter

Personal information
- Nationality: Portuguese
- Born: 2 March 1968 (age 58) Porto, Portugal

Sport
- Sport: Running
- Event: 800 metres

Eduarda Maria Rochateles Castro Coelho (born 2 March 1968) is a retired Portuguese middle-distance runner. She competed in the women's 4 × 400 metres relay at the 1992 Summer Olympics as well as the women's 800 metres in the 1996 Summer Olympics.
