= 1990 European Athletics Indoor Championships – Women's 400 metres =

The women's 400 metres event at the 1990 European Athletics Indoor Championships was held in Kelvin Hall on 3 and 4 March.

== Medalists ==
Gold	Silver	Bronze
Marina Shmonina; Soviet Union	Iolanda Oanță; Romania	Judit Forgács; Hungary

== Results ==
=== Heats ===
The winner of each heat (Q) and the next 2 fastest (q) qualified for the final.

Rank	Heat	Name	Nationality	Time	Notes
1	3	Marina Shmonina	Soviet Union	52.53	Q
2	1	Sally Gunnell	Great Britain	52.92	Q
3	1	Iolanda Oanță	Romania	53.27	q
4	1	Judit Forgács	Hungary	53.30	q
5	3	Linda Kisabaka	West Germany	53.41	
6	3	Linda Keough	Great Britain	53.74	
7	2	Angela Piggford	Great Britain	54.01	Q
8	2	Noémi Bátori	Hungary	54.35	
9	1	Cristina Pérez	Spain	54.53	
10	2	Irmgard Trojer	Italy	54.90	
11	2	Marina Vasarmidou	Greece	55.38	
	3	Anita Protti	Switzerland	DNS	

=== Final ===
Rank	Lane	Name	Nationality	Time	Notes
1st place, gold medalist(s)	2	Marina Shmonina	Soviet Union	51.22	
2nd place, silver medalist(s)	1	Iolanda Oanță	Romania	52.22	
3rd place, bronze medalist(s)	4	Judit Forgács	Hungary	53.02	
4	3	Sally Gunnell	Great Britain	53.38	
5	5	Angela Piggford	Great Britain	53.82	
