= Luminita Zaituc =

German long-distance runner

Luminita Zaituc-Zelaskowski (originally Luminița Zaițuc; born October 9, 1968, in Bucharest) is a retired German long-distance runner of Romanian descent. She has lived in Germany since 1990, and, since 1996, she has been a German citizen.

== Career ==
Zaituc represented her new country in the women's marathon at the 2004 Summer Olympics in Athens, Greece, where she finished in 18th position (2:36:45). She had won the silver medal in the same event at the 2002 European Championships in Athletics. At the national stage, she represented the sports club LG Braunschweig.

She won the Berlin Half Marathon in 2005.

In 2009, Luminita Zaituc put a stop to her athletics career, after having finished in tenth place in the Frankfurt Marathon.

== Achievements ==
- All results regarding marathon, unless stated otherwise

Year	Competition	Venue	Position	Event	Notes
Representing Romania
1986	World Junior Championships	Athens, Greece	5th	4 × 400 m relay	3:38.63
Representing Germany
2001	Frankfurt Marathon	Frankfurt, Germany	1st	Marathon	2:26:01
2002	European Championships	Munich, Germany	2nd	Marathon	2:26:58
2003	Frankfurt Marathon	Frankfurt, Germany	1st	Marathon	2:29:41
2004	Olympic Games	Athens, Greece	18th	Marathon	2:36:45
2006	European Championships	Gothenburg, Sweden	—	Marathon	DNF
