= Athletics at the 2003 All-Africa Games – Women's 4 × 400 metres relay =

The women's 4 × 400 metres relay event at the 2003 All-Africa Games was held on October 15. Only two teams contested the title.

== Results ==
| Rank | Lane | Nation | Athletes | Time | Notes |
|---|---|---|---|---|---|
| 1st place, gold medalist(s) | 4 | Nigeria | Olabisi Afolabi, Glory Nwosu, Doris Jacob, Rosemary Onochie | 3:27.76 | |
| 2nd place, silver medalist(s) | 2 | Cameroon | Hortense Béwouda, Carole Kaboud Mebam, Mireille Nguimgo, Muriel Noah Ahanda | 3:31.52 | |
| | 3 | Senegal | | DNS | |
| | 5 | Mali | | DNS | |
| | 6 | Zimbabwe | | DNS | |
