= Srirat Chimrak =

Thai sprinter

Personal information
- Nationality: Thai
- Born: 19 March 1972 (age 54)

Sport
- Sport: Sprinting
- Event: 4 × 400 metres relay
Medal record
Women's athletics
Representing Thailand
Asian Championships
Bronze medal – third place	1995 Jakarta	4×400 m

Srirat Chimrak (born 19 March 1972) is a Thai sprinter. She competed in the women's 4 × 400 metres relay at the 1992 Summer Olympics.
