= Athletics at the 1991 Summer Universiade – Women's 4 × 100 metres relay =

The women's 4 × 100 metres relay event at the 1991 Summer Universiade was held at the Don Valley Stadium in Sheffield on 25 July 1991.

== Results ==
Rank	Nation	Athletes	Time	Notes
1st place, gold medalist(s)	United States	Andrea James, Tamela Saldana, Chryste Gaines, Anita Howard	44.45	
2nd place, silver medalist(s)	Great Britain	Rachel Kirby, Louise Stuart, Melanie Neef, Christine Bloomfield	44.97	
3rd place, bronze medalist(s)	Italy	Annarita Balzani, Lara Sinico, Laura Galligani, Cristina Picchi	45.24	
4	Chinese Taipei	Wang Huei-chen, Wang Shu-hua, Kuan Yuh-hsiu, Lin Shu-huei	45.70	
5	Nigeria	Beatrice Utondu, Joke Okunade, Mary Tombiri, Ime Akpan	46.95	
