= Athletics at the 1991 Summer Universiade – Women's 200 metres =

The women's 200 metres event at the 1991 Summer Universiade was held at the Don Valley Stadium in Sheffield on 23 and 24 July 1991.

== Medalists ==
Gold	Silver	Bronze
Wang Huei-Chen; Chinese Taipei	Sølvi Olsen; Norway	Michelle Collins; United States

== Results ==
=== Heats ===
Wind:
Heat 1: +1.8 m/s, Heat 2: +2.3 m/s, Heat 3: +3.9 m/s

Rank	Heat	Athlete	Nationality	Time	Notes
1	3	Sølvi Olsen	Norway	23.47	Q
2	2	Michelle Collins	United States	23.71	Q
3	2	Melissa Moore	Australia	23.88	Q
4	3	Tatyana Papilina	Soviet Union	23.91	Q
5	2	Wang Huei-Chen	Chinese Taipei	23.98	q
6	2	Mary Tombiri	Nigeria	24.02	q
7	1	Tamela Saldana	United States	24.09	Q
8	2	Orit Kolodny	Israel	24.09	
9	3	Melanie Neef	Great Britain	24.14	
10	1	Louise Stuart	Great Britain	24.19	Q
11	3	Laura Galligani	Italy	24.42	
12	1	Cristiana Picchi	Italy	24.58	
13	3	Liu Shu-hua	Chinese Taipei	24.88	
14	1	Jacqueline Solíz	Bolivia	26.27	
15	3	Fan Yuk	Hong Kong	26.57	
16	1	Fanta Dao	Mali	27.30	
17	1	Farhad Jasmin Liti	Bangladesh	28.76	
18	2	Mariyam Shifa	Maldives	29.54	

=== Final ===
Wind: +1.6 m/s

Rank	Athlete	Nationality	Time	Notes
1st place, gold medalist(s)	Wang Huei-Chen	Chinese Taipei	23.22	
2nd place, silver medalist(s)	Sølvi Olsen	Norway	23.41	
3rd place, bronze medalist(s)	Michelle Collins	United States	23.41	
4	Tamela Saldana	United States	23.55	
5	Melissa Moore	Australia	23.84	
6	Louise Stuart	Great Britain	23.89	
7	Mary Tombiri	Nigeria	23.99	
8	Tatyana Papilina	Soviet Union	24.10	
