= 1986 World Junior Championships in Athletics – Women's 4 × 400 metres relay =

The women's 4×400 metres relay event at the 1986 World Junior Championships in Athletics was held in Athens, Greece, at Olympic Stadium on 19 and 20 July.

== Medalists ==
Gold	Gisele Harris; Kandice Princhett; Tasha Downing; Janeene Vickers; United States
Silver	Heike Böckmann; Claudia Bartl; Katja Prochnow; Susanne Sieger; East Germany
Bronze	Svetlana Lukashevich; Marina Khripankova; Tatyana Chebykina; Olga Pesnopevtseva; Soviet Union

== Results ==
=== Final ===
20 July

Rank	Nation	Competitors	Time	Notes
1st place, gold medalist(s)	United States	Gisele Harris; Kandice Princhett; Tasha Downing; Janeene Vickers	3:30.45	
2nd place, silver medalist(s)	East Germany	Heike Böckmann; Claudia Bartl; Katja Prochnow; Susanne Sieger	3:30.90	
3rd place, bronze medalist(s)	Soviet Union	Svetlana Lukashevich; Marina Khripankova; Tatyana Chebykina; Olga Pesnopevtseva	3:32.35	
4	Canada	Cheryl Allen; Jill McDermid; Stephanie Taylor; Maxine Scringer	3:36.61	
5	Romania	Ana Maria Draghia; Luminita Zaituc; Denisa Zavelca; Lacramioara Andrei	3:38.63	
6	Hungary	Judit Koczian; Timea Kovács; Mónika Mádai; Noemi Batori	3:40.62	
7	Australia	Jenny Walker; Jodi Allen; Michelle O'Rourke; Sophie Scamps	3:42.58	
8	Greece	Hristína Konstadinídou; Hristína Savváti; María Belehrí; Sotiría Mavromáti	3:50.03	

=== Heats ===
19 July

==== Heat 1 ====
Rank	Nation	Competitors	Time	Notes
1	East Germany	Heike Böckmann; Ellen Kiessling; Susanne Sieger; Katja Prochnow	3:35.92	Q
2	Canada	Cheryl Allen; Jill McDermid; Stephanie Taylor; Maxine Scringer	3:37.92	Q
3	Hungary	Mónika Mádai; Timea Kovács; Judit Koczian; Noemi Batori	3:40.99	Q
4	Greece	Hristína Konstadinídou; Hristína Savváti; María Belehrí; Sotiría Mavromáti	3:49.71	q
5	Yugoslavia	Branka Jošić; Dejana Rakita; Gordana Čotrić; Sanja Beckei	3:52.27	

==== Heat 2 ====
Rank	Nation	Competitors	Time	Notes
1	United States	Gisele Harris; Kandice Princhett; Tasha Downing; Janeene Vickers	3:36.17	Q
2	Soviet Union	Svetlana Lukashevich; Marina Khripankova; Tatyana Chebykina; Olga Pesnopevtseva	3:38.91	Q
3	Romania	Ana Maria Draghia; Luminita Zaituc; Denisa Zavelca; Lacramioara Andrei	3:39.68	Q
4	Australia	Jenny Walker; Jodi Allen; Michelle O'Rourke; Sophie Scamps	3:42.82	q

== Participation ==
According to an unofficial count, 37 athletes from 9 countries participated in the event.

- Australia (4)
- Canada (4)
- East Germany (5)
- Greece (4)
- Hungary (4)
- Romania (4)
- Soviet Union (4)
- United States (4)
- Yugoslavia (4)
