= Athletics at the 1992 Summer Olympics – Women's 4 × 400 metres relay =

Women's 4 × 400 metres relay at the Games of the XXV Olympiad
- Venue: Estadi Olímpic de Montjuïc
- Date: 7 August 1992 (round 1); 8 August 1992 (final)
- Competitors: 62 from 14 nations
- Teams: 62
- Winning time: 3:20.20

Medalists
1st place, gold medalist(s)		Yelena Ruzina, Lyudmila Dzhigalova, Olga Nazarova, Olga Bryzgina, Liliya Nurutdinova*, Marina Shmonina*	Unified Team
2nd place, silver medalist(s)		Natasha Kaiser, Gwen Torrence, Jearl Miles, Rochelle Stevens, Denean Hill*, Dannette Young*	United States
3rd place, bronze medalist(s)		Phylis Smith, Sandra Douglas, Jennifer Stoute, Sally Gunnell * only competed in the preliminary heats.	Great Britain

These are the official results of the women's 4 × 400 metres relay event at the 1992 Summer Olympics in Barcelona, Spain. There were a total of fourteen nations competing.

== Records ==
These were the standing world and Olympic records (in minutes) prior to the 1992 Summer Olympics.

World record	3:15.17	(Soviet Union) Tatyana Ledovskaya (Soviet Union) Olga Nazarova (Soviet Union) Mariya Pinigina (Soviet Union) Olga Bryzgina	Seoul (KOR)	October 1, 1988
Olympic record	3:15.17	(Soviet Union) Tatyana Ledovskaya (Soviet Union) Olga Nazarova (Soviet Union) Mariya Pinigina (Soviet Union) Olga Bryzgina	Seoul (KOR)	October 1, 1988

== Results ==
=== Final ===
RANK	NATION	ATHLETES	TIME
	Unified Team	• Yelena Ruzina • Lyudmila Dzhigalova • Olga Nazarova • Olga Bryzgina	3:20.20
	United States	• Natasha Kaiser • Gwen Torrence • Jearl Miles • Rochelle Stevens	3:20.92
	Great Britain	• Phylis Smith • Sandra Douglas • Jennifer Stoute • Sally Gunnell	3:24.23
4.	Canada	• Rosey Edeh • Charmaine Crooks • Camille-Anise Noel • Jill Richardson-Briscoe	3:25.20
5.	Jamaica	• Catherine Scott • Cathy Ann Rattray • Juliet Campbell • Sandie Richards	3:25.68
6.	Germany	• Uta Rohländer • Heike Meissner • Linda Kisabaka • Anja Rücker	3:26.37
7.	Australia	• Cathy Freeman • Susan Andrews • Renee Poetschka • Michelle Lock	3:26.42
8.	Portugal	• Marta Moreira • Lucrécia Jardim • Elsa Amaral • Eduarda Coelho	3:36.85

=== Heats ===
Qualification: First 3 of each heat (Q) plus the 2 fastest times (q) advanced to the final.

Rank	Heat	Nation	Athletes	Time	Notes
1	1	United States	Denean Hill, Jearl Miles, Dannette Young, Natasha Kaiser	3:22.29	Q
2	2	Unified Team	Marina Shmonina, Lyudmila Dzhigalova, Yelena Ruzina, Liliya Nurutdinova	3:22.91	Q
3	2	Great Britain	Sandra Douglas, Phylis Smith, Jennifer Stoute, Sally Gunnell	3:25.20	Q
4	1	Jamaica	Catherine Scott, Cathy Ann Rattray, Claudine Williams, Juliet Campbell	3:25.55	Q
5	1	Australia	Susan Andrews, Renee Poetschka, Cathy Freeman, Michelle Lock	3:25.68	Q
6	1	Canada	Rosey Edeh, Karen Clarke, Camille-Anise Noel, Charmaine Crooks	3:26.09	q
7	2	Germany	Uta Rohländer, Heike Meissner, Linda Kisabaka, Anja Rücker	3:26.25	Q
8	2	Portugal	Marta Moreira, Eduarda Coelho, Elsa Amaral, Lucrecia Jardim	3:29.38	q, NR
9	2	Switzerland	Kathrin Lüthi, Regula Scalabrin, Martha Grossenbacher, Helen Burkart	3:31.26	
10	2	Spain	Esther Lahoz, Cristina Pérez, Gregoria Ferrer, Julia Merino	3:31.35	
11	1	Hungary	Edit Molnár, Agnes Kozary, Eva Barati, Judit Forgács	3:33.81	
12	1	Thailand	Saleerat Srimek, Sukanya Sang-Nguen, Srirat Chimrak, Noodang Pimpol	3:35.48	
13	2	Bolivia	Jacqueline Soliz, Sandra Antelo, Gloria Burgos, Moré Galetovic	3:53.65	
	1	Cuba	Nancy McLeón, Odalmis Limonta, Daysi Duporty, Ana Fidelia Quirot	DQ	

== See also ==
- 1988 Women's Olympic 4 × 400 m Relay (Seoul)
- 1990 Women's European Championships 4 × 400 m Relay (Split)
- 1991 Women's World Championships 4 × 400 m Relay (Tokyo)
- 1993 Women's World Championships 4 × 400 m Relay (Stuttgart)
- 1994 Women's European Championships 4 × 400 m Relay (Helsinki)
