= Anja Rücker =

German sprinter

Medal record

Women's athletics

Representing Germany

European Championships
Bronze medal – third place	1994 Helsinki	4×400 m

Anja Rücker (born 20 December 1972) is a retired German sprinter who specialized in the 400 metres.

Rücker was born in Bad Lobenstein, Bezirk Gera. At the 1996 Summer Olympics in Atlanta, she won a bronze medal in the 4 × 400 metres relay with her teammates Uta Rohländer, Linda Kisabaka and Grit Breuer. Her personal best time is 49.74 seconds, achieved at the 1999 World Championships in Seville.

== Achievements ==
Year	Competition	Venue	Position	Event	Notes
Representing East Germany
1989	European Junior Championships	Varaždin, Yugoslavia	1st	4 × 400 m relay	3:33.38
1990	World Junior Championships	Plovdiv, Bulgaria	8th	400 m	54.16
1990	World Junior Championships	Plovdiv, Bulgaria	4th	4 × 400 m relay	3:32.37
Representing Germany
1991	European Junior Championships	Thessaloniki, Greece	2nd	400 m	52.73
1991	European Junior Championships	Thessaloniki, Greece	1st	4 × 400 m relay	3:35.24
1992	Olympic Games	Barcelona, Spain	6th	4 × 400 m relay	3:26.37
1992	World Cup	Havana, Cuba	6th	400 m	53.81
1993	World Championships	Stuttgart, Germany	5th	4 × 400 m relay	3:25.49
1994	European Championships	Helsinki, Finland	5th	400 m	51.85
1994	European Championships	Helsinki, Finland	3rd	4 × 400 m relay	3:24.10
1994	World Cup	London, England	8th	400 m	54.21
1996	Olympic Games	Atlanta, United States	3rd	4 × 400 m relay	3:21.14
1997	World Indoor Championships	Paris, France	3rd	4 × 400 m relay	3:28.39
1997	World Championships	Athens, Greece	1st	4 × 400 m relay	3:20.92
1999	World Indoor Championships	Maebashi, Japan	4th	4 × 400 m relay	3:29.06
1999	World Championships	Seville, Spain	2nd	400 m	49.74
1999	World Championships	Seville, Spain	3rd	4 × 400 m relay	3:22.43
