= Marta Moreira =

Portuguese sprinter

Personal information
- Nationality: Portuguese
- Born: 29 November 1966 (age 58)

Sport
- Sport: Sprinting
- Event: 4 × 400 metres relay

Marta Moreira (born 29 November 1966) is a Portuguese sprinter. She competed in the women's 4 × 400 metres relay at the 1992 Summer Olympics.
