= Uta Rohländer =

German sprinter

Personal information
- Full name: Uta Rohländer
- Born: 30 June 1969 (age 57) Merseburg, East Germany
- Height: 1.73 m (5 ft 8 in)

Sport
- Country: Germany
- Sport: Athletics
- Event: 400 metres

Achievements and titles
- Personal bests: 400 metres: 50.33 (Stuttgart; July 1998)
Medal record
Women's athletics
Representing Germany
European Championships
Gold medal – first place	1998 Budapest	4×400 m
Bronze medal – third place	1994 Helsinki	4×400 m

Uta Rohländer (née Fromm; born 30 June 1969 in Merseburg) is a retired German sprinter who specialised in the 400 metres.

At the 1996 Summer Olympics in Atlanta, she won a bronze medal in the 4 × 400 metres relay with her teammates Linda Kisabaka, Anja Rücker and Grit Breuer.

At the 1997 World Championships in Athens, she won a gold medal in the 4 × 400 metres relay with her teammates Anke Feller, Rücker and Breuer.

Her personal best time is 50.33 seconds, achieved in July 1998 in Stuttgart.

She represented the sports club SV Halle. She married Alexander Fromm, son of Dieter Fromm.

== Achievements ==
Year	Competition	Venue	Position	Event	Notes
Representing East Germany
1987	European Junior Championships	Birmingham, United Kingdom	1st	400 m	52.46
1987	European Junior Championships	Birmingham, United Kingdom	1st	4 × 400 m relay	3:32.17
Representing Germany
1991	World Championships	Tokyo, Japan	3rd	4 × 400 m relay	3:21.25
1992	Olympic Games	Barcelona, Spain	6th	4 × 400 m relay	3:26.37
1994	European Championships	Helsinki, Finland	heats (18th)	400 m	53.30
1994	European Championships	Helsinki, Finland	3rd	4 × 400 m relay	3:24.10
1995	World Championships	Gothenburg, Sweden	semi-final (20th)	400 m	51.99
1995	World Championships	Gothenburg, Sweden	4th	4 × 400 m relay	3:26.10
1995	Universiade	Fukuoka, Japan	4th	4 × 400 m relay	3:30.97
1996	Olympic Games	Atlanta, United States	3rd	4 × 400 m relay	3:21.14
1997	World Championships	Athens, Greece	1st	4 × 400 m relay	3:20.92
1998	European Championships	Budapest, Hungary	4th	400 m	50.48
1998	European Championships	Budapest, Hungary	1st	4 × 400 m relay	3:23.03
1998	World Cup	Johannesburg, South Africa	1st	4 × 400 m relay	3:24.26
1999	World Championships	Seville, Spain	3rd	4 × 400 m relay	3:22.43

Note: Results in parentheses indicate overall position in that round
