= Krzysztof Sieńko =

Polish bobsledder

Personal information
- Nationality: Polish
- Born: 15 June 1976 (age 48); Wałbrzych, Poland

Sport
- Sport: Bobsleigh

Krzysztof Sieńko (born 15 June 1976) is a Polish bobsledder. He competed at the 1998 Winter Olympics and the 2002 Winter Olympics.
