= Nicole Green =

American sprinter

Personal information
- Born: October 28, 1971 (age 54) St. Louis, Missouri, United States
Medal record
Women's athletics
Representing United States
World Athletics Championships
Gold medal – first place	1995 Gothenburg	4 × 400 m relay
Summer Universiade
Silver medal – second place	1995 Fukuoka	4 × 400 m relay

Nicole Green (born October 28, 1971) is a retired professional sprinter sponsored by Nike and Powerade. She won the gold medal in the 4 × 400 m relay at the 1995 World Championships in Athletics by virtue of running in the preliminary rounds representing the United States, and she also won the silver medal in the 4 × 400 m at the 1995 Summer Universiade.

Competing for the Kansas State Wildcats track and field team, Green won the 1995 NCAA Division I Outdoor Track and Field Championships in the 400 m.

In 1995, Green was once hospitalized alongside sprinter Quincy Watts for suspected dehydration at a track meet. Green would recover and go on to set the American record in the 4x100m at the 1998 Penn Relays.

== Major international competitions ==
Year	Competition	Venue	Position	Event	Notes
1996	Prefontaine Classic	Eugene, Oregon	7th	400 m	52.5h
