= Sophie Malbranque =

French sprinter (born 1959)

Personal information
- Nationality: France
- Born: 24 December 1959 (age 66) Arras, France

Sport
- Event: 400 metres
Medal record
Representing France
Summer Universiade
Bronze medal – third place	1981 Bucharest	400m

Sophie Malbranque (born 24 December 1959) is a former French athlete, who specialised in the 400 meters.

== Biography ==
She won three French 400m championship titles, two outdoor in 1980 and 1981, and one indoor in 1981, and participated in the 1980 Olympics in Moscow, where she was eliminated in the heats of the 400m. The following year, she came in third at the 1981 Summer Universiade in Bucharest, Romania.

=== Prize list ===
- French Championships in Athletics :
  - two times winner of the 400m 1980 and 1981
- French Athletics Indoor Championships :
  - winner of the 400 m in 1981

=== Records ===
Personal records
Event	Performance	Location	Date
400 m	51 s 81		1980
