= Jearl Miles Clark =

American athlete (born 1966)

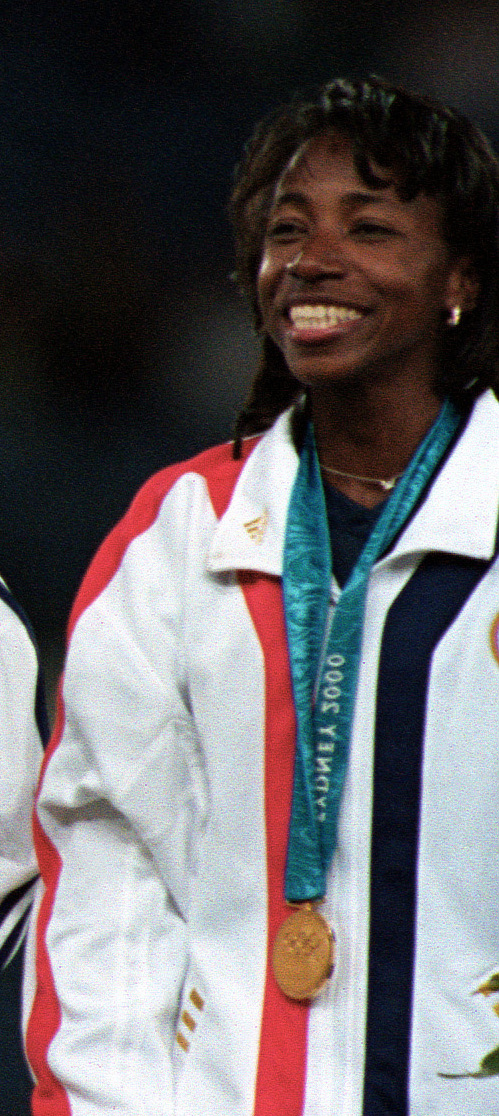
- Jearl Miles Clark on the awards stand in Sydney

Personal information
- Born: September 4, 1966 (age 60) Gainesville, Florida, U.S.
Medal record
Women's athletics
Representing the United States
Olympic Games
Gold medal – first place	1996 Atlanta	4 × 400 m relay
Gold medal – first place	2000 Sydney	4 × 400 m relay
Silver medal – second place	1992 Barcelona	4 × 400 m relay
World Championships
Gold medal – first place	1993 Stuttgart	400 m
Gold medal – first place	1993 Stuttgart	4 × 400 m relay
Gold medal – first place	1995 Gothenburg	4 × 400 m relay
Gold medal – first place	2003 Paris	4 × 400 m relay
Silver medal – second place	1991 Tokyo	4 × 400 m relay
Silver medal – second place	1997 Athens	4 × 400 m relay
Silver medal – second place	1999 Seville	4 × 400 m relay
Bronze medal – third place	1995 Gothenburg	400 m
Bronze medal – third place	1997 Athens	400 m
Summer Universiade
Gold medal – first place	1989 Duisburg	4 x 400 m relay
Silver medal – second place	1989 Duisburg	400 m

Jearl Atawa Miles Clark (née Miles; born September 4, 1966, in Gainesville, Florida) is an American athlete who competed mainly in the 400 and 800 meters.

She held the American record in the women's 800 m at 1:56.40.

She competed for the United States in the 1992 Summer Olympics held in Barcelona, Spain in the 4 × 400 meters where she won the silver medal with her teammates Natasha Kaiser, Gwen Torrence and Rochelle Stevens.

She returned to the 1996 Summer Olympics in Atlanta, U.S. where she again ran with Rochelle Stevens and fellow Americans Maicel Malone and Kim Graham to win the gold medal in the 4 × 400 meters.

She made a third appearance in the Olympics in the 2000 Summer Olympics held in Sydney, Australia and again walked off with the gold medal in the 4 × 400 metres with her teammates Monique Hennagan, Marion Jones and LaTasha Colander-Richardson. This medal was later stripped due to steroid doping admissions of Marion Jones. However, she and 6 other members of the team would successfully appeal the decision to strip them of their medals in July 2010.

She is married to J. J. Clark, brother of Olympians Joetta Clark and Hazel Clark. Her father-in-law was Joe Louis Clark.

She was a volunteer track and field coach at the University of Connecticut, where her husband worked as head coach for track and field. She was inducted into the National Track and Field Hall of Fame in 2010.

Miles-Clark is a 1989 graduate of Alabama A&M University.

She currently resides with her husband, J.J. and their son, Jorell in California.
