= Yana Manuylova =

Ukrainian sprinter

Personal information
- Nationality: Ukrainian
- Born: 9 December 1971 (age 54)

Sport
- Sport: Sprinting
- Event: 400 metres

Yana Manuylova (born 9 December 1971) is a Ukrainian sprinter. She competed in the women's 400 metres at the 1996 Summer Olympics.
