= Georgina Oladapo =

English athlete (born 1967)

Georgina Day née Oladapo
Personal information
- Nationality: British (English)
- Born: 15 May 1967 (age 58) Lewisham, London, England

Sport
- Sport: Athletics
- Event(s): Sprints, 400m, long jump
- Club: Borough of Hounslow AC

Georgina Esther Day (née Oladapo; born 15 May 1967) is a former English sprinter and long jumper who represented Great Britain in the women's 4 × 400 metres relay at the 1996 Atlanta Olympics.

== Biography ==
Oladapo was born on 15 May 1967 in Lewisham, London. She finished second behind Sue Hearnshaw in the long jump event at the 1984 WAAA Championships, where she set a personal best of 6.52 metres.

Oladapo was a bronze medallist in the 4 × 100 metres relay at the 1985 European Junior Championships and achieved her best times in the 100 metres and 200 metres with 11.64 and 23.65 secs in 1985. Also in 1985 Oladapo finished second behind Kathy Cook in the 200 metres event at the 1985 WAAA Championships.

Oladapo was a member of the British quartet that finished fifth in the 4 × 400 metres relay final at the 1995 World Championships, while her 400 metres best of 50.6 secs was set when finishing second at the 1996 AAA Championships.

At the 1996 Olympic Games in Atlanta, she represented Great Britain in the 4 × 400 metres relay.

Oladapo married comedian Steve Day and has five children.

== International competitions ==
Year	Competition	Venue	Position	Event	Notes
Representing England
1982	World Gymnasiade	Lille, France	3rd	Long jump	5.76 m
1982	World Gymnasiade	Lille, France	2nd	4 × 100 m	47.38
Representing Great Britain
1985	European Junior Championships	Cottbus, Germany	4th	100 m	11.64
1985	European Junior Championships	Cottbus, Germany	3rd	4 × 100 m	44.78
1995	European Cup	Villeneuve-d'Ascq, France	4th	4 × 400 m	3:28.34
1995	World Championships	Gothenburg, Sweden	5th	4 × 400 m	3:26.89
1996	Olympic Games	Atlanta, United States	9th (h)	4 × 400 m	3:28.13
(h) Indicates overall position in qualifying heats
