= Phylis Smith =

British sprinter

Phylis Smith (née Watt)
Personal information
- Nationality: British (English)
- Born: 29 September 1965 (age 60) Birmingham, West Midlands, England
- Height: 169 cm (5 ft 7 in)
- Weight: 62 kg (137 lb)

Sport
- Sport: Athletics
- Club: Trafford AC
Medal record
Representing Great Britain
Olympic Games
Bronze medal – third place	1992 Barcelona	4x400 m
World Championships
Bronze medal – third place	1993 Stuttgart	4x400 m
European Championships
Bronze medal – third place	1994 Helsinki	400 m
Representing England
Commonwealth Games
Gold medal – first place	1994 Victoria	4x400 m

Phylis Smith, née Phylis Watt, (29 September 1965) is a female former sprinter from Great Britain who won an Olympic bronze medal in the 4 x 400 metres relay in Barcelona 1992. In 1994, she won a European Championships bronze medal in the 400 metres.

== Biography ==
Smith was born in Birmingham, England. She placed third over 100 metres at the 1989 AAAs National Championships and won the 1990 UK National title at 200m (also 2nd in the 100 m). However, it would be in the 400 metres that she would find international success. In 1991, along with Lorraine Hanson, Linda Keough and Sally Gunnell she was a member of the UK 4 × 400 m relay quartet that finished fourth in the final of the World Championships in Tokyo, setting a UK national record that would stand for 16 years.

Smith's individual breakthrough came at the 1992 Olympic Games in Barcelona, when she ran a lifetime best of 50.40 secs in her semi-final to move to second on the UK all-time list behind Kathy Cook and reach the Olympic final. In the final she placed eighth in 50.87. Later she teamed up with Sandra Douglas, Jennifer Stoute and Gunnell, to win a bronze medal in the 4 × 400 m relay. Smith ran a fine first leg to put the UK in the lead.

At the 1993 World Championships in Stuttgart, she withdrew from the individual 400 m but returned for the relay to win a bronze medal with Tracy Goddard, Keough and Gunnell.

Smith won another bronze medal at the 1994 European Championships in Helsinki, this time in the individual 400 metres, in 51.30 secs. The race was won by the Olympic Champion Marie-Jose Perec. The British 4 × 400 m relay squad narrowly missed a medal finishing fourth. At the Commonwealth Games she was fourth in the 400m final in 51.49, before winning a gold medal in the relay, after the disqualification of original winners, Australia. She concluded the 1994 season at the World Cup in London, placing fourth in the 400 metres, in 51.36, before teaming up with Linda Keough, Melanie Neef and Sally Gunnell to win the 4 × 400 m relay. The British squad were well in front at the first changeover, after another excellent first leg by Smith.

Smith returned from injury to earn selection for her second Olympic Games in 1996. In Atlanta, she reached the quarter-finals of the 400 metres. Her last major championships was the 1997 World Indoors in Paris, where she reached the 400m semi-finals and finished sixth in the 4 × 400 m final in a new UK record. Earlier in the 1997 indoor season, she had broken the UK indoor record for 400 metres with 51.69 in Birmingham, to improve Sally Gunnell's three-year-old mark of 51.72. Smith's record would last for four years until Katharine Merry ran 50.53 in 2001.

As of 2015, Smith's 50.40 best, ranks her 6th on the UK all-time list over 400 metres.

== National titles ==
- AAA Championships
  - 400 m: 1993, 1996
- UK Athletics Championships
  - 200 m: 1989, 1992
  - 400 m: 1993
- AAA Indoor Championships
  - 400 m: 1997

== International competitions ==
Year	Competition	Venue	Position	Event	Notes
Representing Great Britain / England
1991	World Championships	Tokyo, Japan	4th	4 × 400 m	3:22.01
1992	Olympic Games	Barcelona, Spain	8th	400 m	50.87 (50.40 sf)
1992	Olympic Games	Barcelona, Spain	3rd	4 × 400 m	2:24.23
1993	World Championships	Stuttgart, Germany	3rd	4 × 400 m	3:23.41
1994	European Championships	Helsinki, Finland	3rd	400 m	51.30
1994	European Championships	Helsinki, Finland	4th	4 × 400 m	3:24.14
1994	Commonwealth Games	Victoria, Canada	4th	400 m	51.49
1994	Commonwealth Games	Victoria, Canada	1st	4 × 400 m	3:27.06
1994	World Cup	London, England	4th	400 m	51.36
1994	World Cup	London, England	1st	4 × 400 m	3:27.36
1996	Olympic Games	Atlanta, United States	quarter-final	400 m	52.16 (51.29 ht)
1996	Olympic Games	Atlanta, United States	heats	4 × 400 m	3:28.13
1997	World Indoor Championships	Paris (Bercy), France	semi-final	400 m	52.86
1997	World Indoor Championships	Paris (Bercy), France	6th	4 × 400 m	3:32.25
