= Marie-Louise Bévis =

French sprinter

Marie-Louise Bévis (born 12 October 1972 in Morne-à-l'Eau, Guadeloupe) is a retired French sprinter who specialized in the 400 metres.

She finished fifth at the 1995 World Indoor Championships, won the gold medal at the 1997 Jeux de la Francophonie, and the gold medal at the 2001 Mediterranean Games. She also competed at the 2000 European Indoor Championships without reaching the final.

In the 4 × 400 metres relay she finished sixth at the 1993 World Championships, and fifth at the 2002 European Championships. She also competed at the 1995 World Championships and the 2003 World Championships.

Her personal best times are 11.89 seconds in the 100 metres, achieved in September 2003 in Saint-Florentin; 23.95 seconds in the 200 metres, achieved in May 2002 in Lisbon; and 52.06 seconds in the 400 metres, achieved in June 2003 in Nogent-sur-Marne.

== Biography ==
In the 400-meter race, she finished sixth at the 1995 IAAF World Indoor Championships and won the 1997 Francophonie Games and the 2001 Mediterranean Games. She also competed in several international finals in the 4 × 400-meter relay. She placed sixth at the 1993 World Championships and sixth at the 2001 edition, and took fifth place at the 2002 European Championships.

Marie-Louise Bévis has won seven French 400-meter titles: three outdoor titles in 1997, 2000, and 2003, and four indoor titles in 1993, 1996, 1998, and 2000.
