= Olabisi Afolabi =

Nigerian sprinter (born 1975)

Personal information
- Born: 31 October 1975 (age 50) Ilorin, Kwara State, Nigeria

Sport
- Sport: Track and field
Medal record
Representing Nigeria
Summer Olympics
Silver medal – second place	1996 Atlanta	4x400 m relay
Commonwealth Games
Bronze medal – third place	2002 Manchester	4x400 m relay
Summer Universiade
Gold medal – first place	1995 Fukuoka	400 m
Bronze medal – third place	1993 Buffalo	4x400 m relay

Olabisi "Bisi" Afolabi (born 31st October 1975) is a retired female track and field athlete from Nigeria, who specialized in the 400 metres during her career. She was a member of the Nigerian team that won the silver medal in the 4 x 400 metres relay at the 1996 Summer Olympics.

She won the World Junior Championships in 1994. She also has a silver medal from the 1999 All-Africa Games and a bronze medal from the 1995 All-Africa Games.

She is now married and has children.

== Competition record ==
Year	Competition	Venue	Position	Event	Notes
Representing Nigeria
1993	Universiade	Buffalo, United States	3rd	4 × 400 m relay	3:34.97
1993	World Championships	Stuttgart, Germany	10th (h)	4 × 400 m relay	3:33.12
1994	African Junior Championships	Algiers, Algeria	1st	400 m	53.59
1994	African Junior Championships	Algiers, Algeria	1st	4 × 100 m relay	46.15
1994	African Junior Championships	Algiers, Algeria	2nd	4 × 400 m relay	3:45.41
1994	World Junior Championships	Lisbon, Portugal	1st	400 m	51.97
1994	World Junior Championships	Lisbon, Portugal	14th (h)	4 × 400 m relay	3:49.16
1994	Commonwealth Games	Victoria, Canada	7th	400 m	52.21
1994	Commonwealth Games	Victoria, Canada	–	4 × 400 m relay	DQ
1995	World Championships	Gothenburg, Sweden	25th (h)	400 m	51.79
1995	World Championships	Gothenburg, Sweden	6th	4 × 400 m relay	3:27.85
1995	Universiade	Fukuoka, Japan	1st	400 m	50.50
1995	All-Africa Games	Harare, Zimbabwe	3rd	400 m	51.53
1996	Olympic Games	Atlanta, United States	13th (sf)	400 m	51.40
1996	Olympic Games	Atlanta, United States	2nd	4 × 400 m relay	3:21.04
1997	World Indoor Championships	Paris, France	12th (sf)	400 m	53.33
1997	World Championships	Athens, Greece	13th (sf)	400 m	51.44
1997	World Championships	Athens, Greece	7th	4 × 400 m relay	3:30.04
1999	World Championships	Seville, Spain	8th (sf)	400 m	50.40
1999	All-Africa Games	Johannesburg, South Africa	2nd	400 m	50.34
2000	Olympic Games	Sydney, Australia	20th (qf)	400 m	51.87
2000	Olympic Games	Sydney, Australia	4th	4 × 400 m relay	3:23.80
2002	Commonwealth Games	Manchester, United Kingdom	3rd	4 × 400 m relay	3:29.16
2003	World Championships	Paris, France	12th (sf)	400 m	51.38
2003	All-Africa Games	Abuja, Nigeria	8th	400 m	52.77
2003	All-Africa Games	Abuja, Nigeria	1st	4 × 400 m relay	3:27.76
