= Camara Jones =

American sprinter

Personal information
- Born: May 15, 1972 (age 54) Vancouver, Washington, United States

Sport
- Sport: Track and field
Medal record
Representing United States
World Championships
Gold medal – first place	1995 Gothenburg	4 × 400 m relay
Summer Universiade
Silver medal – second place	1995 Fukuoka	4 x 400 m relay

Camara Jones (born May 15, 1972) was an American sprinter who specialized in the 400 metres.

Jones competed for the Oregon Ducks track and field team in the NCAA.

Her foremost achievement was a gold medal in the 4 × 400 metres relay at the 1995 World Championships. Her personal best time was 51.44 seconds, achieved in May 1995 in Tucson.
