= Marie-José Pérec =

French sprinter (born 1968)

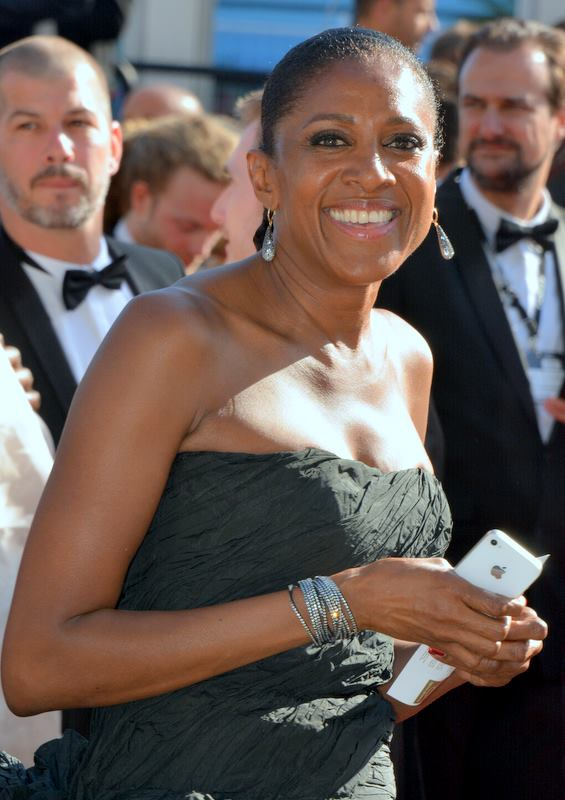
- Pérec at the 2016 Cannes Film Festival

Personal information
- Born: 9 May 1968 (age 58) Basse-Terre, Guadeloupe, France
- Years active: 1984–2004
- Height: 5 ft 10 1/2 in (179 cm)
- Weight: 132 lb (60 kg)

Sport
- Country: France
- Sport: Athletics
- Event(s): 200 metres, 400 metres
Medal record
Women's athletics
Representing France
Olympic Games
Gold medal – first place	1992 Barcelona	400 m
Gold medal – first place	1996 Atlanta	200 m
Gold medal – first place	1996 Atlanta	400 m
World Championships
Gold medal – first place	1991 Tokyo	400 m
Gold medal – first place	1995 Gothenburg	400 m
European Championships
Gold medal – first place	1994 Helsinki	400 m
Gold medal – first place	1994 Helsinki	4 × 400 m relay
Bronze medal – third place	1990 Split	400 m

Marie-José Pérec (French: [maʁi ʒoze peʁɛk]; born 9 May 1968) is a retired French track and field sprinter who specialised in the 200 and 400 metres and is a three-time Olympic gold medalist. She was born in the French overseas department of Guadeloupe and moved to Paris when she was 16 years old.

== Athletics career ==
Pérec first represented France in the 200 metres event at the 1988 Summer Olympics in Seoul, reaching the quarter-finals. She won the 400 metres world title at the 1991 World Championships in Tokyo and repeated the feat at the 1995 World Championships in Gothenburg. She won her first Olympic gold medal in the 400 metres event at the 1992 Summer Olympics in Barcelona.

She entered the 200 metres and 400 metres events at the 1996 Atlanta Games and won both, achieving the second-ever Olympic 200 metres/400 metres gold medal double, after Valerie Brisco-Hooks in Los Angeles 1984. Pérec won the 400 metres title in an Olympic record time of 48.25 seconds, which ranked her as the third-fastest woman of all time. It took another 23 years before Salwa Eid Naser, in October 2019, surpassed her mark to demote Pérec to fourth in the list of world's fastest-ever female 400-metre sprinters.

In addition to her Olympic and World titles, Pérec won the 400 metres title and was part of the gold medal-winning 4 × 400 metres relay team at the 1994 European Championships in Helsinki. The two 1996 Olympic golds were Pérec's last international titles. In 1997, she shifted to the 200 metres but withdrew at the semi-finals stage in the World Championships that year after sustaining a thigh muscle injury while warming up. She was diagnosed with glandular fever in March 1998, and the long recovery forced her to take time out from competitions until the following year.

On 8 July 2000, having not run a 400 metres race since 1996, Pérec began her Olympic title defence by finishing third in Nice (at the Nikaia meeting of the 2000 IAAF Grand Prix), behind eventual Olympic silver and bronze medalists Lorraine Graham and Katharine Merry. This was the last significant race Pérec took part in. On 22 September 2000, she pulled out of the 200 metres and 400 metres events of the 2000 Sydney Games, several days before they were due to start. Pérec claimed that she had been threatened and insulted several times since arriving in Australia and that the local press, who were supporting Australian athlete Cathy Freeman, had been trying to sabotage her chances of winning 400 metres gold.

Pérec trained in Los Angeles with the HSI track team and is listed as a legend on the team's page. She officially retired from competitive athletics in June 2004 at the age of 36.

== Life after retirement from athletics ==
Pérec enrolled in the top French business school ESSEC and graduated in 2007 with a Master's in Sports Management.

She is a member of the 'Champions for Peace' club, a group of more than 70 famous elite athletes committed to promoting peace in the world through sports, created by Peace and Sport, a Monaco-based international organisation.

On 21 October 2012, Pérec was elected president of the Ligue Régionale d'Athlétisme de la Guadeloupe, the governing body for athletics in Guadeloupe.

Pérec participated in the French reality music competition Mask Singer as the Red Panther, performing Stromae's "Papaoutai" and Angèle's "Balance ton quoi" before being eliminated in the first episode.

On 26 July 2024, Pérec and judoka Teddy Riner lit the Olympic cauldron at the 2024 Summer Olympics opening ceremony in Paris.

== Family ==
Pérec's partner is French freestyle skier Sébastien Foucras. They have one child, a son named Nolan, born on 30 March 2010.

== Awards ==
Pérec was chosen as the French Champion of Champions in 1992 and 1996 by the French sports daily L'Équipe.

On 9 October 2013, she was awarded the Officier de la Légion d'honneur by French President François Hollande in the Élysée Palace. Just before presenting the insignia to Pérec during the award ceremony, Hollande described her as "one of the most brilliant athletes in the history of French athletics". She had received the Chevalier de la Légion d'honneur in 1996.

Pérec was inducted into the IAAF Hall of Fame in November 2013.

== Personal bests ==
Event	Time (seconds)	Wind (m/s)	Date	Venue	All-time ranking
100 m	10.96	+1.2	27 July 1991	Dijon, France	43rd (15th)
200 m	21.99 (FR)	+1.1	2 July 1993	Villeneuve-d'Ascq, France	21st (9th)
400 m	48.25 (FR), (OR)		29 July 1996	Atlanta, Georgia	4th (3rd)
400 m hurdles	53.21 (FR)		16 August 1995	Zürich, Switzerland	20th (6th)

- Rankings outside the brackets are world rankings
- Rankings inside the brackets are European
- FR = French record
- OR = Olympic record

Awards and achievements
Preceded by (United States) Kim Batten	Women's Track & Field ESPY Award; 1997	Succeeded by (United States) Marion Jones
Sporting positions
Preceded by (United States) Gwen Torrence	Women's 200 m Best Year Performance alongside (Nigeria) Mary Onyali; 1996	Succeeded by (United States) Marion Jones
Olympic Games
Preceded by Jean-François Lamour	Flagbearer for France; Atlanta 1996	Succeeded by David Douillet
Preceded by (China) Dinigeer Yilamujiang and Zhao Jiawen	Final Olympic torchbearer Paris 2024 along Teddy Riner	Succeeded by (Italy) Deborah Compagnoni, Sofia Goggia, and Alberto Tomba
Preceded by (Japan) Naomi Osaka	Final Summer Olympic torchbearer Paris 2024 along Teddy Riner	Succeeded by (United States) TBA 2028
