= Daniela Georgieva =

Bulgarian sprinter (born 1969)

Personal information
- Born: 1969 (age 56–57) Sofia, Bulgaria

Sport
- Country: Bulgaria
- Sport: Track and Field
- Event(s): 400 meters, 200 meters
Medal record
Representing Bulgaria
Women's athletics
Bronze medal – third place	1995 Barcelona	400 metres

Daniela Georgieva (Bulgarian: Даниела Георгиева, née Spasova - Спасова; born 1969) is a retired Bulgarian sprinter. She won a bronze medal at the 1995 IAAF World Indoor Championships and holds the Bulgarian record for 400 metres indoor (51.74 s) and the former national record outdoor (50.25 seconds). She also represented Bulgaria by running in the 400 metres at the 2000 Summer Olympics in Sydney and is a three-time European Cup Champion. She is currently on the coaching staff of the Missouri Tigers athletics team at the University of Missouri in Columbia, Missouri.

== Biography ==
Georgieva ran the 400 metres at Alexandroupolis on 9 July 1988 in a time of 52.46 seconds. On 1 June 1994 she ran 23.84 in the 200 metres in Bratislava and that year also competed at the European Athletics Championships in Helsinki where she finished seventh. On 20 May 1995 she ran a personal best of 50.25 in the 400 metres in Sofia and won bronze at the 1995 IAAF World Indoor Championships in Barcelona, Spain, behind Irina Privalova of Russia who took Gold and Sandy Richards of Jamaica who took silver. On 1 June 1995, Georgieva set her personal best in the 200 metres in Saint-Denis with a time of 23.26.

In 1996, Georgieva studied for a Bachelor of Sport degree at the National Sport Academy in Sofia. On 9 May 1998 she competed in the 400 metres in Osaka, with a time of 55.38 seconds. She ran 52.72 in Ankara on 22 May 1999 and in February 2000 she was disqualified from the 2000 European Athletics Indoor Championships in Ghent in a run in with Claudia Marx. Georgieva then narrowly missed winning a bronze medal and beating her personal best with a time of 51.27 in Nürnberg on 25 June 2000. She represented Bulgaria at the 2000 Summer Olympics in Sydney in the 400 metres, but she finished 6th in Heat 7 of the first round with a time of 54.46 and did not proceed further. Georgieva ran 52.73 in the 400 metres in Madrid on 7 July 2001, but following that event, her performances declined as her career reached a close, running 53.65 in the 400 metres at Olathe on 25 May 2002 and 23.90 in Houston, Texas on 25 May 2002.

Georgieva moved to the United States in 2001, graduating with a Bachelor of Arts degree from Central Methodist University in 2005. She later joined the coaching staff of the Missouri Tigers athletics team. She is married to sprinter Stanislav Georgiev.
