= Svetlana Goncharenko =

Russian sprinter (born 1971)

Medal record

Representing Russia

Olympic Games
Bronze medal – third place	2000 Sydney	4×400 m

European Championships
Silver medal – second place	1994 Helsinki	400 m
Silver medal – second place	1994 Helsinki	4×400 m
Silver medal – second place	1998 Budapest	4×400 m

Svetlana Valentinovna Goncharenko (Russian: Светлана Валентиновна Гончаренко; born May 28, 1971, in Rostov-on-Don as Svetlana Doronina) is a former Russian athlete who mainly competed in the 200 metres. In addition to winning medals in individual contests, she has been a very successful relay runner, winning the bronze medal in 4 × 400 metres relay at the 2000 Olympics.

== Personal bests ==
- 100 metres - 11.13 (1998)
- 200 metres - 22.46 (1998)
- 400 metres - 50.23 (2000)

== International competitions ==
Representing Russia
Year	Competition	Venue	Position	Event	Notes
1994	European Indoor Championships	Paris, France	1st	400 m	51.62
1994	European Championships	Helsinki, Finland	2nd	400 m	51.24
1994	European Championships	Helsinki, Finland	2nd	4 × 400 m relay	3:24.06
1995	World Indoor Championships	Barcelona, Spain	1st	4 × 400 m relay	3:29.29
1995	World Championships	Gothenburg, Sweden	2nd	4 × 400 m relay	3:23.98
1997	World Indoor Championships	Paris, France	3rd	200 metres	22.85
1997	World Indoor Championships	Paris, France	1st	4 × 400 m relay	3:26.84 WR
1998	European Indoor Championships	Valencia, Spain	1st	200 metres	22.46
1998	European Championships	Budapest, Hungary	2nd	4 × 400 m relay	3:23.56
1999	World Indoor Championships	Maebashi, Japan	2nd	200 metres	22.69
1999	World Indoor Championships	Maebashi, Japan	1st	4 × 400 m relay	3:24.25 WR
1999	World Championships	Seville, Spain	1st	4 × 400 m relay	3:21.98
2000	Summer Olympics	Sydney, Australia	3rd	4 × 400 m relay	3:23.46
2004	World Indoor Championships	Budapest, Hungary	2nd	200 metres	23.15
