= Linda Kisabaka =

German middle-distance runner

Personal information
- Born: 9 April 1969 (age 57) Wuppertal, West Germany

Sport
- Sport: Track and field
Medal record
Representing Germany
Olympic Games
Bronze medal – third place	1996 Atlanta	4x400m relay
European Championships
Bronze medal – third place	1994 Helsinki	4x400m relay
Representing West Germany
Summer Universiade
Silver medal – second place	1989 Duisburg	4x400m relay

Linda Kisabaka (born 9 April 1969) is a retired German middle distance runner. She ran the 400 metres until 1996, when she began specialising in the 800 metres. She retired in 2001, having represented the sports clubs Bayer 04 Leverkusen and LAZ Leipzig during her active career.

Her personal best time is 1:58.24 minutes, achieved in August 1996 in Zürich. The same year she won a bronze medal in the 4 × 400 metres relay at the 1996 Summer Olympics in Atlanta, with teammates Uta Rohländer, Anja Rücker and Grit Breuer.

== Achievements ==
Year	Competition	Venue	Position	Event	Notes
Representing West Germany
1987	European Junior Championships	Birmingham, England	3rd	400 m	53.89
1987	European Junior Championships	Birmingham, England	2nd	4 × 400 m relay	3:38.49
1988	World Junior Championships	Sudbury, Canada	16th (h)	400 m	54.88
1988	World Junior Championships	Sudbury, Canada	15th (h)	4 × 400 m relay	3:55.49
1990	European Indoor Championships	Glasgow, United Kingdom	5th (h)	400 m	53.41
1990	European Championships	Split, Yugoslavia	17th (h)	400 m	53.09
Representing Germany
1992	Olympic Games	Barcelona, Spain	6th	4 × 400 m relay	3:26.37
1993	Universiade	Buffalo, United States	4th	400 m hurdles	57.18
1993	World Championships	Stuttgart, Germany	5th	4 × 400 m relay	3:25.49
1994	European Championships	Helsinki, Finland	2nd (h)	4 × 400 m relay	3:27.50
1995	World Championships	Gothenburg, Sweden	4th	4 × 400 m relay	3:26.10
1996	Olympic Games	Atlanta, United States	3rd	4 × 400 m relay	3:21.14
