= Tatyana Chebykina =

Russian sprinter

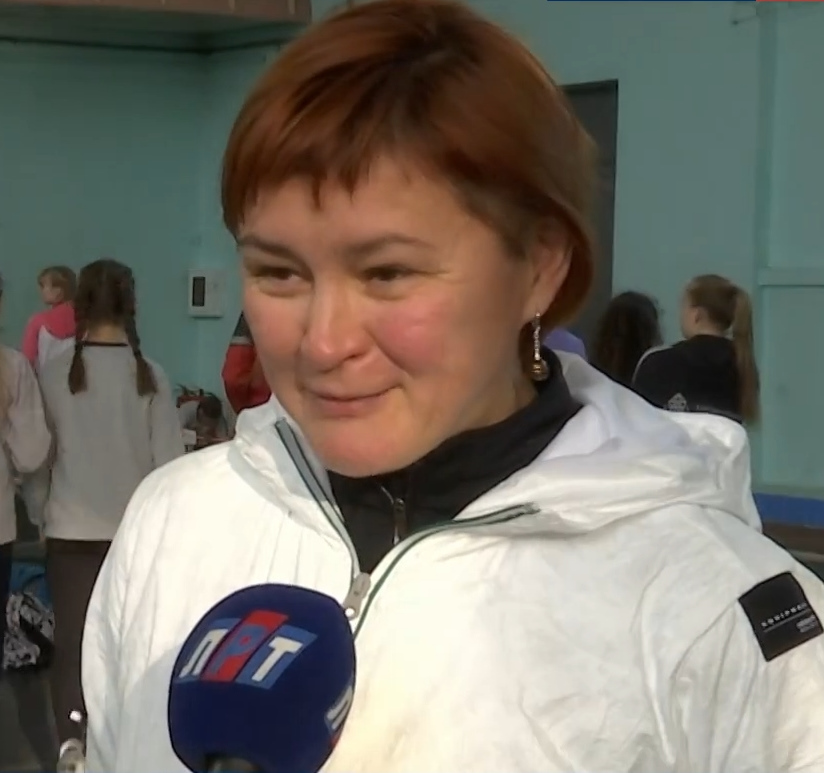
- Tatyana Chebykina in 2018

Personal information
- Born: November 22, 1968 (age 57) Yekaterinburg, Soviet Union

Sport
- Sport: Track and field
Medal record
Representing Russia
World Championships
Gold medal – first place	1999 Seville	4x400m relay
Silver medal – second place	1995 Gothenburg	4x400m relay
World Indoor Championships
Gold medal – first place	1995 Barcelona	4x400m relay
Gold medal – first place	1997 Paris	4x400m relay
Gold medal – first place	1999 Maebashi	4x400m relay
European Indoor Championships
Bronze medal – third place	1996 Stockholm	400m
Summer Universiade
Gold medal – first place	1995 Fukuoka	4x400m relay
Silver medal – second place	1995 Fukuoka	400m

Tatyana Gennadyevna Chebykina (Russian: Татьяна Геннадьевна Чебыкина; born November 22, 1968) is a former Russian athlete who mainly competed in the 400 metres. Over the course of her career her greatest success came in relay races.

She is married to the race walker Nikolay Matyukhin.

== Achievements ==
Year	Competition	Venue	Position	Event	Notes
Representing the Soviet Union
1986	World Junior Championships	Athens, Greece	9th (sf)	200 m	23.96 (wind: -0.8 m/s)
1986	World Junior Championships	Athens, Greece	5th	4 × 100 m relay	44.58
1986	World Junior Championships	Athens, Greece	3rd	4 × 400 m relay	3:32.35
Representing Russia
1995	World Indoor Championships	Barcelona, Spain	1st	4 × 400 m relay	3:29.29
1995	World Championships	Gothenburg, Sweden	2nd	4 × 400 m relay	3:23.98
1996	European Indoor Championships	Stockholm, Sweden	3rd	400 metres	51.71
1997	World Indoor Championships	Paris, France	1st	4 × 400 m relay	3:26.84
1999	World Indoor Championships	Maebashi, Japan	1st	4 × 400 m relay	3:24.25
1999	World Championships	Seville, Spain	1st	4 × 400 m relay	3:21.98

== Personal bests ==
- 200 metres - 23.20 (1996)
- 400 metres - 51.01 (1995)
