= Olena Rurak =

Ukrainian sprinter

Personal information
- Nationality: Ukrainian
- Born: 7 February 1972 (age 54) Dnipro, Soviet Union

Sport
- Sport: Sprinting
- Event: 400 metres
Medal record
Women's athletics
Representing Ukraine
European Cup
Silver medal – second place	1996 Madrid	4×400 m relay
Summer Universiade
Bronze medal – third place	1995 Fukuoka	400 m
Bronze medal – third place	1995 Fukuoka	4x400 m relay

Olena Rurak (born 7 February 1972) is a Ukrainian sprinter. She competed in the 400 metres at the 1996 Summer Olympics and the 2000 Summer Olympics.

== See also ==
- List of Maccabiah records in athletics
