= 1991 IAAF World Indoor Championships – Women's 4 × 400 metres relay =

The women's 4 × 400 metres relay at the 1991 IAAF World Indoor Championships was held on 10 March. It was the first time that this event was contested at the World Indoor Championships.

== Results ==
Rank	Nation	Athletes	Time	Notes
1st place, gold medalist(s)	Germany	Sandra Seuser, Katrin Schreiter, Annett Hesselbarth, Grit Breuer	3:27.22	WR, CR
2nd place, silver medalist(s)	Soviet Union	Marina Shmonina, Lyudmila Dzhigalova, Margarita Ponomaryova, Aelita Yurchenko	3:27.95	NR
3rd place, bronze medalist(s)	United States	Terri Dendy, Lillie Leatherwood, Jearl Miles, Diane Dixon	3:29.00	AR
4	Spain	Sandra Myers, Julia Merino, Gregoria Ferrer, Esther Lahoz	3:31.86	NR
5	France	Elsa Devassoigne, Marie-Christine Cazier, Evelyne Elien, Viviane Dorsile	3:34.05	
