= 1991 World Championships in Athletics – Women's 400 metres =

Video on YouTube Official Video

These are the official results of the Women's 400 metres event at the 1991 IAAF World Championships in Tokyo, Japan. There were a total of 37 participating athletes, with five qualifying heats and the final held on Tuesday 27 August 1991.

== Medalists ==
Gold	Marie-José Pérec; France (FRA)
Silver	Grit Breuer; Germany (GER)
Bronze	Sandra Myers; Spain (ESP)

== Schedule ==
- All times are Japan Standard Time (UTC+9)

Heats
24.08.1991 – 16:00h
Quarterfinals
25.08.1991 – 18:20h
Semifinals
26.08.1991 – 17:55h
Final
27.08.1991 – 19:30h

== Final ==
RANK	FINAL	TIME
	Marie-José Pérec (FRA)	49.13
	Grit Breuer (GER)	49.42
	Sandra Myers (ESP)	49.78
4.	Olga Bryzgina (URS)	49.82
5.	Jearl Miles (USA)	50.50
6.	Ximena Restrepo (COL)	50.79
7.	Lillie Leatherwood (USA)	51.53
8.	Diane Dixon (USA)	51.73

== Semifinals ==
- Held on Monday 1991-08-26

RANK	HEAT 1	TIME
1.	Marie-José Pérec (FRA)	49.94
2.	Grit Breuer (GER)	50.14
3.	Olga Bryzgina (URS)	50.26
4.	Diane Dixon (USA)	50.75
5.	Lorraine Hanson (GBR)	50.93
6.	Norfalia Carabalí (COL)	52.40
7.	Renee Poetschka (AUS)	52.76
8.	Julia Merino (ESP)	53.41

RANK	HEAT 2	TIME
1.	Sandra Myers (ESP)	50.64
2.	Lillie Leatherwood (USA)	50.68
3.	Jearl Miles Clark (USA)	50.79
4.	Ximena Restrepo (COL)	50.82
5.	Lyudmila Dzhigalova (URS)	50.85
6.	Fatima Yusuf (NGR)	50.91
7.	Linda Keough (GBR)	50.98
8.	Solvi Olsen-Meinseth (NOR)	53.63

== Quarterfinals ==
- Held on Sunday 1991-08-25

RANK	HEAT 1	TIME
1.	Jearl Miles Clark (USA)	51.88
2.	Sandra Myers (ESP)	52.01
3.	Grit Breuer (GER)	52.16
4.	Fatima Yusuf (NGR)	52.46
5.	Solvi Olsen-Meinseth (NOR)	52.95
6.	Aïssatou Tandian (SEN)	53.06
7.	Cheryl Allen (CAN)	53.21
–	Aelita Yurchenko (URS)	DNF

RANK	HEAT 2	TIME
1.	Lyudmila Dzhigalova (URS)	50.76
2.	Diane Dixon (USA)	50.84
3.	Linda Keough (GBR)	51.13
4.	Renee Poetschka (AUS)	51.65
5.	Julia Merino (ESP)	51.82
6.	Norfalia Carabalí (COL)	52.38
7.	Judit Forgacs (HUN)	53.79
–	Charity Opara (NGR)	DQ

RANK	HEAT 3	TIME
1.	Marie-José Pérec (FRA)	50.61
2.	Ximena Restrepo (COL)	50.66
3.	Lillie Leatherwood (USA)	50.75
4.	Olga Bryzgina (URS)	50.79
5.	Lorraine Hanson (GBR)	51.02
6.	Karin Janke (GER)	53.08
7.	Nancy McLeon (CUB)	53.72
–	Martha Grossenbacher (SUI)	DNS

== Qualifying heats ==
- Held on Saturday 1991-08-24

RANK	HEAT 1	TIME
1.	Marie-José Pérec (FRA)	51.00
2.	Olga Bryzgina (URS)	51.36
3.	Linda Keough (GBR)	51.51
4.	Solvi Olsen-Meinseth (NOR)	52.84
5.	Cheryl Allen (CAN)	53.17
6.	Huang Yanhong (CHN)	54.51
7.	Lasnet Nkouka (CGO)	57.85

RANK	HEAT 2	TIME
1.	Sandra Myers (ESP)	52.70
2.	Fatima Yusuf (NGR)	52.81
3.	Nancy McLeon (CUB)	52.87
4.	Norfalia Carabalí (COL)	53.31
5.	Aïssatou Tandian (SEN)	53.65
6.	Vaciseva Tavaga (FIJ)	58.82
7.	Obieng Juliana Nzang (GEQ)	1:04.13

RANK	HEAT 3	TIME
1.	Jearl Miles Clark (USA)	51.88
2.	Lorraine Hanson (GBR)	52.08
3.	Ximena Restrepo (COL)	52.41
4.	Karin Janke (GER)	53.73
5.	Reawadee Srithoa (THA)	54.94
6.	Zeinabou Jean-Wali (NIG)	1:05.03
–	Sharmaine Williams (TCA)	DQ
–	Suzie Tanefo (CMR)	DNS

RANK	HEAT 4	TIME
1.	Diane Dixon (USA)	52.43
2.	Grit Breuer (GER)	52.56
3.	Aelita Yurchenko (URS)	52.65
4.	Renee Poetschka (AUS)	52.65
5.	Julia Merino (ESP)	53.04
6.	Orit Kolodni (ISR)	54.26
7.	Claudia Acerenza (URU)	55.82
8.	Graciela von Schmeling (PAR)	57.37

RANK	HEAT 5	TIME
1.	Charity Opara (NGR)	51.07
2.	Lyudmila Dzhigalova (URS)	51.45
3.	Lillie Leatherwood (USA)	53.04
4.	Judit Forgacs (HUN)	53.24
5.	Martha Grossenbacher (SUI)	53.77
6.	Shermaine Ross (GRN)	55.90
7.	Mary-Estelle Kapalu (VAN)	56.47

== See also ==
- 1987 Women's World Championships 400 metres (Rome)
- 1988 Women's Olympic 400 metres (Seoul)
- 1990 Women's European Championships 400 metres (Split)
- 1992 Women's Olympic 400 metres (Barcelona)
- 1993 Women's World Championships 400 metres (Stuttgart)
