= 1991 World Championships in Athletics – Women's 4 × 400 metres relay =

These are the official results of the Women's 4 × 400 metres event at the 1991 IAAF World Championships in Tokyo, Japan. Their final was held on Sunday September 1, 1991.

== Schedule ==
- All times are Japan Standard Time (UTC+9)

Semi-Final
31.08.1991 – 19:45h
Final
01.09.1991 – 17:50h

== Final ==
RANK	NATION	ATHLETES	TIME
	Soviet Union (URS)	• Tatyana Ledovskaya • Lyudmila Dzhigalova • Olga Nazarova • Olha Bryzhina	3:18.43
	United States (USA)	• Rochelle Stevens • Diane Dixon • Jearl Miles • Lillie Leatherwood	3:20.15
	Germany (GER)	• Uta Rohländer • Katrin Krabbe • Christine Wachtel • Grit Breuer	3:21.25
4.	Great Britain (GBR)	• Lorraine Hanson • Phylis Smith • Sally Gunnell • Linda Keough	3:22.01
5.	Nigeria (NGR)	• Fatima Yusuf • Mary Onyali • Airat Bakare • Charity Opara	3:24.45
6.	Canada (CAN)	• Rosey Edeh • Karen Clarke • Cheryl Allen • Charmaine Crooks	3:27.42
7.	Spain (ESP)	• Julia Merino • Blanca Lacambra • Sandra Myers • Gregoria Ferrer	3:27.57
8.	Hungary (HUN)	• Edit Molnár • Agnes Kozary • Noémi Bátori • Judit Forgács	3:29.07

== Heats ==
- Held on Saturday 1991-08-31

RANK	HEAT 1	ATHLETES	TIME
1.	United States (USA)	• Rochelle Stevens • Diane Dixon • Natasha Kaiser-Brown • Lillie Leatherwood	3:24.92
2.	Germany (GER)	• Uta Rohlander • Annett Hesselbarth • Christine Wachtel • Katrin Schreiter	3:25.93
3.	Canada (CAN)	• Rosey Edeh • Karen Clarke • Cheryl Allen • Charmaine Crooks	3:27.15
4.	Hungary (HUN)	• Edit Molnar • Agnes Kozary • Noemi Batori • Judit Forgacs	3:28.38
5.	Switzerland (SUI)	• Kathrin Luthi • Regula Scalabrin • Martha Grossenbacher • Anita Protti	3:30.32
6.	Norway (NOR)	• Trine Rugsveen • Lisbeth Pettersen • MonaKarin Riisnes • Solvi Olsen-Meinseth	3:32.76

RANK	HEAT 2	ATHLETES	TIME
1.	Soviet Union (URS)	• Anna Chuprina • Lyudmila Dzhigalova • Tatyana Alekseyeva • Olga Nazarova	3:23.38
2.	Great Britain (GBR)	• Phylis Smith • Lorraine Hanson • Linda Keough • Sally Gunnell	3:23.89
3.	Nigeria (NGR)	• Charity Opara • Airat Bakare • Omotayo Akinremi • Fatima Yusuf	3:26.29
4.	Spain (ESP)	• Blanca Lacambra • Julia Merino • Esther Lahoz • Sandra Myers	3:29.12
5.	Cuba (CUB)	• Lency Montelier • Odalmis Limonta • Nancy McLeon • Ana Fidelia Quirot	3:31.43
6.	Japan (JPN)	• Yumiko Tokuda • Masayo Kitagawa • Ryoko Sato • Keiko Amano	3:35.82
7.	India (IND)	• Ashwini Nachappa • Alphonsa Rayen • Sylvina Cecil Pais • Saramma Kutty	3:38.54

== See also ==
- 1988 Women's Olympic 4 × 400 m Relay (Seoul)
- 1990 Women's European Championships 4 × 400 m Relay (Split)
- 1992 Women's Olympic 4 × 400 m Relay (Barcelona)
- 1993 Women's World Championships 4 × 400 m Relay (Stuttgart)
- 1994 Women's European Championships 4 × 400 m Relay (Helsinki)
