= 1990 European Athletics Championships – Women's 400 metres =

Women's 400 metres at the European Athletics Championships
- Venue: Stadion Poljud
- Location: Split, Yugoslavia
- Dates: 27, 28, and 29 August 1990
- Competitors: 26 from 12 nations
- Winning time: 49.50 s

Medalists
gold medal	Grit Breuer	East Germany
silver medal	Petra Schersing	East Germany
bronze medal	Marie-José Pérec	France

These are the official results of the Women's 400 metres event at the 1990 European Championships in Split, Yugoslavia, held at Stadion Poljud on 27, 28, and 29 August 1990.

== Results ==
=== Heats ===
27 August

==== Heat 1 ====
Rank	Name	Nationality	Time	Notes
1	Grit Breuer	East Germany	52.50	Q
2	Marie-José Pérec	France	52.56	Q
3	Linda Keough	United Kingdom	52.60	Q
4	Lisbeth Andersen	Norway	53.01	q
5	Judit Forgács	Hungary	53.06	q
6	Linda Kisabaka	West Germany	53.09	
7	Julia Merino	Spain	53.74	

==== Heat 2 ====
Rank	Name	Nationality	Time	Notes
1	Lyudmila Dzhigalova	Soviet Union	52.42	Q
2	Annette Hesselbarth	East Germany	52.72	Q
3	Helga Arendt	West Germany	53.01	Q
4	Lorraine Hanson	United Kingdom	53.57	
5	Erzsébet Szabó	Hungary	54.08	
6	Gordana Čotrić	Yugoslavia	54.46	
7	Regula Scalabrin	Switzerland	54.88	

==== Heat 3 ====
Rank	Name	Nationality	Time	Notes
1	Marina Shmonina	Soviet Union	52.18	Q
2	Petra Schersing	East Germany	52.44	Q
3	Martha Grossenbacher	Switzerland	52.76	Q
4	Viviane Dorsile	France	52.91	q
5	Angela Piggford	United Kingdom	53.00	q
6	Gretha Tromp	Netherlands	55.64	

==== Heat 4 ====
Rank	Name	Nationality	Time	Notes
1	Yelena Ruzina	Soviet Union	51.64	Q
2	Karin Janke	West Germany	52.83	Q
3	Evelyne Elien	France	52.95	Q
4	Sonja Finell	Finland	53.47	
5	Ágnes Kozáry	Hungary	54.13	
6	Blanca Lacambra	Spain	54.61	

=== Semi-finals ===
28 August

==== Semi-final 1 ====
Rank	Name	Nationality	Time	Notes
1	Grit Breuer	East Germany	50.89	Q
2	Petra Schersing	East Germany	51.05	Q
3	Linda Keough	United Kingdom	51.20	Q
4	Viviane Dorsile	France	52.06	Q
5	Helga Arendt	West Germany	52.16	
6	Judit Forgács	Hungary	52.77	
7	Martha Grossenbacher	Switzerland	53.57	
	Yelena Ruzina	Soviet Union	DNF	

==== Semi-final 2 ====
Rank	Name	Nationality	Time	Notes
1	Annette Hesselbarth	East Germany	51.43	Q
2	Marina Shmonina	Soviet Union	51.45	Q
3	Lyudmila Dzhigalova	Soviet Union	51.56	Q
4	Marie-José Pérec	France	51.63	Q
5	Karin Janke	West Germany	51.65	
6	Evelyne Elien	France	53.05	
7	Lisbeth Andersen	Norway	53.26	
8	Angela Piggford	United Kingdom	53.53	

=== Final ===
29 August

Rank	Name	Nationality	Time	Notes
1st place, gold medalist(s)	Grit Breuer	East Germany	49.50	
2nd place, silver medalist(s)	Petra Schersing	East Germany	50.51	
3rd place, bronze medalist(s)	Marie-José Pérec	France	50.84	
4	Annette Hesselbarth	East Germany	51.14	
5	Linda Keough	United Kingdom	51.22	
6	Lyudmila Dzhigalova	Soviet Union	51.31	
7	Marina Shmonina	Soviet Union	51.67	
8	Viviane Dorsile	France	52.11	
