= 1987 World Championships in Athletics – Women's 400 metres =

These are the official results of the Women's 400 metres event at the 1987 IAAF World Championships in Rome, Italy. There were a total number of 41 participating athletes, with six qualifying heats and the final held on 31 August 1987.

== Results ==
=== Final ===
Monday, 31 August 1987

| Rank | Name | Result | Notes |
|---|---|---|---|
| Gold medal | Olga Bryzgina (URS) | 49.38 | |
| Silver medal | Petra Müller (GDR) | 49.94 | |
| Bronze medal | Kirsten Emmelmann (GDR) | 50.20 | |
| 4 | Mariya Pinigina (URS) | 50.53 | |
| 5 | Lillie Leatherwood (USA) | 50.82 | |
| 6 | Jillian Richardson (CAN) | 51.03 | |
| 7 | Diane Dixon (USA) | 51.13 | |
| 8 | Olga Nazarova (URS) | 51.20 | |

=== Semifinals ===
Sunday, 30 August 1987

| Rank | Heat | Name | Result | Notes |
|---|---|---|---|---|
| 1 | 2 | Petra Müller (GDR) | 50.15 | Q |
| 2 | 3 | Kirsten Emmelmann (GDR) | 50.53 | Q |
| 3 | 1 | Mariya Pinigina (URS) | 50.83 | Q |
| 4 | 3 | Diane Dixon (USA) | 50.83 | Q |
| 5 | 2 | Olga Bryzgina (URS) | 50.88 | Q |
| 6 | 1 | Jillian Richardson (CAN) | 50.91 | Q |
| 7 | 1 | Lillie Leatherwood (USA) | 50.95 | q |
| 8 | 3 | Olga Nazarova (URS) | 51.07 | q |
| 9 | 3 | Ute Thimm (FRG) | 51.23 | |
| 10 | 2 | Denean Howard (USA) | 51.28 | |
| 11 | 3 | Sandie Richards (JAM) | 51.54 | |
| 12 | 2 | Charmaine Crooks (CAN) | 51.69 | |
| 13 | 3 | Marita Payne-Wiggins (CAN) | 51.75 | |
| 14 | 1 | Dagmar Neubauer (GDR) | 52.15 | |
| 15 | 2 | Maria Magnolia Figueiredo (BRA) | 52.24 | |
| 16 | 1 | Cathy Rattray-Williams (JAM) | 52.51 | |
| 17 | 1 | Fabienne Ficher (FRA) | 52.58 | |
| 18 | 2 | Gisela Kinzel (FRG) | 52.66 | |
| 19 | 1 | Helga Arendt (FRG) | 52.80 | |
| 20 | 3 | Francisca Chepkurui (KEN) | 52.86 | |
| 21 | 2 | Judit Forgács (HUN) | 52.99 | |
| 22 | 2 | Ilrey Oliver (JAM) | 53.35 | |
| 23 | 1 | Blanca Lacambra (ESP) | 54.72 | |
| 24 | 3 | Maria Usifo (NGR) | DNS | |

=== Heats ===
Saturday, 29 August 1987

| Rank | Heat | Name | Result | Notes |
|---|---|---|---|---|
| 1 | 3 | Mariya Pinigina (URS) | 51.38 | Q |
| 2 | 1 | Olga Bryzgina (URS) | 51.62 | Q |
| 2 | 6 | Kirsten Emmelmann (GDR) | 51.62 | Q |
| 4 | 2 | Petra Muller (GDR) | 51.68 | Q |
| 5 | 6 | Diane Dixon (USA) | 51.72 | Q |
| 6 | 5 | Jillian Richardson (CAN) | 51.94 | Q |
| 7 | 4 | Dagmar Neubauer (GDR) | 51.96 | Q |
| 8 | 5 | Olga Nazarova (URS) | 52.04 | Q |
| 9 | 3 | Denean Howard (USA) | 52.06 | Q |
| 10 | 1 | Sandie Richards (JAM) | 52.07 | Q |
| 11 | 4 | Lillie Leatherwood (USA) | 52.16 | Q |
| 12 | 4 | Marita Payne-Wiggins (CAN) | 52.21 | Q |
| 13 | 5 | Maria Magnolia Figueiredo (BRA) | 52.29 | Q |
| 14 | 2 | Gisela Kinzel (FRG) | 52.34 | Q |
| 15 | 2 | Blanca Lacambra (ESP) | 52.46 | Q |
| 16 | 3 | Ute Thimm (FRG) | 52.48 | Q |
| 17 | 1 | Charmaine Crooks (CAN) | 52.49 | Q |
| 18 | 2 | Fabienne Ficher (FRA) | 52.59 | q |
| 19 | 3 | Cathy Rattray-Williams (JAM) | 52.64 | q |
| 20 | 5 | Helga Arendt (FRG) | 52.80 | q |
| 21 | 5 | Judit Forgacs (HUN) | 53.15 | q |
| 22 | 1 | Francisca Chepkurui (KEN) | 53.21 | q |
| 23 | 6 | Ilrey Oliver (JAM) | 53.59 | Q |
| 24 | 2 | Maria Usifo (NGR) | 53.64 | q |
| 25 | 3 | Mercy Addy (GHA) | 54.13 | |
| 26 | 1 | Bei Assumpta Achuo (CMR) | 54.18 | |
| 27 | 5 | Ester Petitón (CUB) | 54.50 | |
| 28 | 4 | Josephine Mary Singarayar (MAS) | 54.56 | |
| 29 | 2 | Jocelyn Joseph (ATG) | 55.61 | |
| 30 | 6 | Ruth Morris (ISV) | 56.36 | |
| 31 | 2 | Anna Cherry (LCA) | 57.20 | |
| 32 | 3 | Diane Dunrod-Francis (SKN) | 57.64 | |
| 33 | 5 | Vanessa Barlow (SAM) | 1:01.53 | |
| 34 | 4 | Nadine Mbitoloum (CHA) | 1:01.71 | |
| – | 3 | Mariam Zewde (ETH) | DNF | |
| – | 1 | Kungu Bakombo (ZAI) | DNS | |
| – | 1 | P.T. Usha (IND) | DNS | |
| – | 4 | Nawal El Moutawakil (MAR) | DNS | |
| – | 4 | Adina Valdez (TRI) | DNS | |
| – | 6 | Cosetta Campana (ITA) | DNS | |
| – | 6 | Chakma Sharmila Ray (BAN) | DNS | |
