= Yelena Golesheva =

Russian track and field sprinter (born 1966)

Personal information
- Born: 12 July 1966 (age 60)

Sport
- Sport: Track and field
Medal record
Representing Soviet Union
Summer Universiade
Silver medal – second place	1991 Sheffield	4x400m relay
Bronze medal – third place	1989 Duisburg	4x400m relay
European Indoor Championships
Bronze medal – third place	1992 Genoa	400m
Representing Russia
World Championships
Silver medal – second place	1993 Stuttgart	4x400m relay
European Championships
Gold medal – first place	1994 Helsinki	4x400m relay

Yelena Golesheva (Russian: Елена Голешева, married Scheers; born 12 July 1966) is a Russian-born female former track and field sprinter who competed for the Soviet Union and Russia, before obtaining Belgian citizenship. She has a personal best of 51.28 seconds for the 400 metres, set on 21 June 1989. She won a bronze medal in the 400 metres at the 1992 European Indoor Championships, and a silver medal at the 1993 World Championships in the 4 × 400 metres relay (ran in the heats only).

== Career ==
She had most of her success in the national 4 × 400 metres relay teams. She had her first medals in 1989, taking bronze medals at the Summer Universiade (with Yelena Vinogradova, Margarita Ponomaryova and Lyudmila Dzhigalova) and World Cup (with Dzhigalova, Marina Shmonina and Yelena Ruzina). At the 1991 Universiade she took fifth in the individual 400 metres and shared in the relay silver alongside Inna Yevseyeva, Galina Moskvina and Anna Knoroz.

Her greatest individual achievement was at the 1992 European Athletics Indoor Championships, where she won a bronze medal behind Sandra Myers and fellow Soviet Olga Bryzgina. She took two major medals as a heats alternate runner at the 1993 World Championships in Athletics and the 1994 European Athletics Championships, being switched out for Irina Privalova and Svetlana Goncharenko, respectively. Her last medal as a finalist came at the 1994 Goodwill Games, where she, Yelena Andreyeva, Yelena Ruzina, and Tatyana Zakharova were the runners-up behind the United States.

She married a Belgian man named Scheers and took Belgian nationality, even going on to win a 400 m title at the Belgian Athletics Championships in 1997.

== International competitions ==
Year	Competition	Venue	Position	Event	Notes
Representing Soviet Union
1989	Universiade	Duisburg, West Germany	3rd	4 × 400 m relay	3:28.60
1989	World Cup	Barcelona, Spain	3rd	4 × 400 m relay	3:26.15
1991	Universiade	Sheffield, United Kingdom	5th	400 m	52.74
1991	Universiade	Sheffield, United Kingdom	2nd	4 × 400 m relay	3:29.64
1992	European Indoor Championships	Genoa, Italy	3rd	400 m	52.07
Representing Russia
1993	World Championships	Stuttgart, Germany	2nd	4 × 400 m relay	(heats runner)
1994	Goodwill Games	Saint Petersburg, Russia	2nd	4 × 400 m relay	3:25.00
1994	European Championships	Helsinki, Finland	1st	4 × 400 m relay	(heats runner)

== National titles ==
- Belgian Athletics Championships
  - 400 m: 1997

== See also ==
- List of World Championships in Athletics medalists (women)
- List of European Athletics Indoor Championships medalists (women)
- List of eligibility transfers in athletics
