= Julia Merino =

Spanish sprinter (born 1971)

Personal information
- Born: 3 March 1971 (age 54) Valladolid, Spain
- Height: 1.71 m (5 ft 7 in)
- Weight: 61 kg (134 lb)

Sport
- Sport: Track and field
- Event: 400 metres

María Julia Merino García (born 3 March 1971 in Valladolid) is a retired Spanish sprinter who specialised in the 400 metres. She represented her country at the 1992 Summer Olympics and 1991 World Championships. In addition she won the gold medal at the 1991 Mediterranean Games.

Her personal bests in the event are 51.82 seconds outdoors (Tokyo 1991) and 52.22 seconds indoors (Genoa 1992).

== Competition record ==
| Year | Competition | Venue | Position | Event | Notes |
Representing Spain
| 1986 | World Junior Championships | Athens, Greece | 9th (sf) | 400 m | 54.84 |
| 1987 | European Junior Championships | Birmingham, United Kingdom | 7th | 400 m | 55.94 |
| 1987 | European Junior Championships | Birmingham, United Kingdom | 5th | 4 × 400 m relay | 3:41.26 |
| 1988 | World Junior Championships | Sudbury, Canada | 17th (sf) | 400 m | 55.12 |
| 1988 | World Junior Championships | Sudbury, Canada | 7th | 4 × 400 m relay | 3:38.94 |
| 1989 | European Indoor Championships | The Hague, Netherlands | 10th (h) | 800 m | 2:07.23 |
| 1989 | European Junior Championships | Varaždin, Yugoslavia | 3rd | 400 m | 53.57 |
| 1989 | European Junior Championships | Varaždin, Yugoslavia | 8th | 4 × 400 m relay | 3:42.47 |
| 1989 | World Cup | Barcelona, Spain | 6th | 400 m | 53.63 |
| 1989 | World Cup | Barcelona, Spain | 8th | 4 × 400 m relay | 3:36.50 |
| 1990 | World Junior Championships | Plovdiv, Bulgaria | 5th | 400 m | 53.48 |
| 1990 | European Championships | Split, Yugoslavia | 20th (h) | 400 m | 53.74 |
| 1990 | European Championships | Split, Yugoslavia | 9th (h) | 4 × 400 m relay | 3:31.76 |
| 1991 | World Indoor Championships | Seville, Spain | 10th (sf) | 400 m | 53.51 |
| 1991 | World Indoor Championships | Seville, Spain | 4th | 4 × 400 m relay | 3:31.86 |
| 1991 | Mediterranean Games | Athens, Greece | 1st | 400 m | 51.88 |
| 1991 | World Championships | Tokyo, Japan | 15th (sf) | 400 m | 53.41 |
| 1991 | World Championships | Tokyo, Japan | 8th (h) | 4 × 400 m relay | 3:29.12 |
| 1992 | European Indoor Championships | Genoa, Italy | 4th | 400 m | 52.22 |
| 1992 | Olympic Games | Barcelona, Spain | 22nd (qf) | 400 m | 52.43 |
| 1992 | Olympic Games | Barcelona, Spain | 10th (h) | 4 × 400 m relay | 3:31.35 |
