= 1989 IAAF World Indoor Championships – Women's 400 metres =

The women's 400 metres event at the 1989 IAAF World Indoor Championships was held at the Budapest Sportcsarnok in Budapest on 3 and 4 March.

== Medalists ==
Gold	Silver	Bronze
Helga Arendt; West Germany	Diane Dixon; United States	Jillian Richardson; Canada

== Results ==
=== Heats ===
The first 2 of each heat (Q) and next 2 fastest (q) qualified for the semifinals.

Rank	Heat	Name	Nationality	Time	Notes
1	1	Maree Holland	Australia	52.90	Q, AR
2	3	Sally Gunnell	Great Britain	52.91	Q
3	1	Marina Shmonina	Soviet Union	53.03	Q
4	2	Diane Dixon	United States	53.15	Q
5	3	Charmaine Crooks	Canada	53.22	Q
6	3	Helga Arendt	West Germany	53.31	q
7	1	Judit Forgács	Hungary	53.33	q
8	1	Jearl Miles	United States	53.33	q
9	2	Jillian Richardson	Canada	53.36	Q
10	2	Erzsébet Szabó	Hungary	53.41	q
11	3	Marina Kharlamova	Soviet Union	53.44	q
12	3	Iolanda Oanță	Romania	53.50	q
13	2	Marcia Tate	Jamaica	53.53	
14	2	Angela Piggford	Great Britain	53.69	

=== Semifinals ===
First 3 of each semifinal (Q) qualified directly for the final.

Rank	Heat	Name	Nationality	Time	Notes
1	1	Diane Dixon	United States	52.12	Q
2	1	Jillian Richardson	Canada	52.17	Q
3	1	Maree Holland	Australia	52.21	Q, AR
4	1	Marina Kharlamova	Soviet Union	52.23	PB
5	2	Helga Arendt	West Germany	52.29	Q
6	2	Marina Shmonina	Soviet Union	52.33	Q
7	2	Sally Gunnell	Great Britain	52.35	Q
8	1	Charmaine Crooks	Canada	52.52	
9	2	Iolanda Oanță	Romania	52.93	
10	2	Erzsébet Szabó	Hungary	52.93	
11	2	Jearl Miles	United States	53.28	
12	1	Judit Forgács	Hungary	53.86	

=== Final ===
Rank	Lane	Name	Nationality	Time	Notes
1st place, gold medalist(s)	3	Helga Arendt	West Germany	51.52	CR
2nd place, silver medalist(s)	4	Diane Dixon	United States	51.77	AR
3rd place, bronze medalist(s)	5	Jillian Richardson	Canada	52.02	
4	6	Maree Holland	Australia	52.17	AR
5	2	Marina Shmonina	Soviet Union	52.44	
6	1	Sally Gunnell	Great Britain	52.60	
