= 1991 IAAF World Indoor Championships – Women's 400 metres =

The women's 400 metres event at the 1991 IAAF World Indoor Championships was held on 8, 9 and 10 March.

== Medalists ==
Gold	Silver	Bronze
Diane Dixon; United States	Sandra Myers; Spain	Anita Protti; Switzerland

== Results ==
=== Heats ===
First 2 of each heat (Q) and next 6 fastest (q) qualified for the semifinals.

Rank	Heat	Name	Nationality	Time	Notes
1	3	Aelita Yurchenko	Soviet Union	52.15	Q
2	3	Noémi Bátori	Hungary	52.60	Q, PB
3	3	Julia Merino	Spain	52.68	q
4	2	Diane Dixon	United States	52.72	Q
5	2	Sandra Myers	Spain	53.01	Q
6	2	Vivienne Spence-Gardner	Jamaica	53.34	q
7	2	Lyudmila Dzhigalova	Soviet Union	53.87	q
8	1	Jearl Miles	United States	53.88	Q
9	1	Katrin Schreiter	Germany	54.00	Q
10	1	Anita Protti	Switzerland	54.01	q
11	1	Iolanda Oanță	Romania	54.26	q
12	2	Rosey Edeh	Canada	54.53	q
13	3	Norfalia Carabalí	Colombia	54.78	
14	3	Nezha Bidouane	Morocco	55.69	
15	1	Claudia Acerenza	Uruguay	56.57	NR
16	1	Lasnet Nkouka	Republic of the Congo	58.50	NR
	3	Fatima Yusuf	Nigeria	DQ	

=== Semifinals ===
First 3 of each semifinal (Q) qualified directly for the final.

Rank	Heat	Name	Nationality	Time	Notes
1	2	Diane Dixon	United States	51.97	Q
2	2	Aelita Yurchenko	Soviet Union	52.14	Q
3	1	Sandra Myers	Spain	52.16	Q
4	2	Anita Protti	Switzerland	52.18	Q, NR
5	1	Jearl Miles	United States	52.43	Q
6	1	Lyudmila Dzhigalova	Soviet Union	52.68	Q
7	1	Vivienne Spence-Gardner	Jamaica	52.84	PB
8	2	Katrin Schreiter	Germany	53.05	
9	2	Iolanda Oanță	Romania	53.40	
10	2	Julia Merino	Spain	53.51	
11	1	Rosey Edeh	Canada	54.51	
	1	Noémi Bátori	Hungary	DNF	

=== Final ===
Rank	Name	Nationality	Time	Notes
1st place, gold medalist(s)	Diane Dixon	United States	50.64	CR, AR
2nd place, silver medalist(s)	Sandra Myers	Spain	50.99	NR
3rd place, bronze medalist(s)	Anita Protti	Switzerland	51.41	NR
4	Aelita Yurchenko	Soviet Union	51.59	PB
5	Jearl Miles	United States	52.00	PB
6	Lyudmila Dzhigalova	Soviet Union	52.19	PB
