= Norfalia Carabalí =

Personal information
- Born: 21 January 1964 (age 62) Santander de Quilichao, Colombia

Sport
- Sport: Track and field
Medal record
Representing Colombia
Central American and Caribbean Games
Silver medal – second place	1986 Santiago	400m
Silver medal – second place	1990 Mexico City	200m
Silver medal – second place	1990 Mexico City	400m
Silver medal – second place	1990 Mexico City	4x100m relay
Silver medal – second place	1993 Ponce	4x100m relay
Silver medal – second place	1993 Ponce	4x400m relay
Silver medal – second place	1998 Maracaibo	4x100m relay
Bronze medal – third place	1998 Maracaibo	400m

Norfalia Carabalí Villegas (born 21 January 1964) is a retired sprinter who competed predominantly in the 400 metres. She represented her native Colombia for most of her career before changing allegiance to Spain in 2000. She competed at three Summer Olympics, in 1988, 1992 and 2000, as well as five World Championships. Her biggest success was reaching the final at the 1993 World Championships in Stuttgart. In addition, she won multiple medals at regional level.

== Competition record ==
Year	Competition	Venue	Position	Event	Notes
Representing Colombia
1982	Southern Cross Games	Santa Fe, Argentina	2nd	800 m	2:11.55
1982	Southern Cross Games	Santa Fe, Argentina	6th	1500 m	4:51.65
1982	Southern Cross Games	Santa Fe, Argentina	3rd	4 × 100 m	49.3
1983	South American Junior Championships	Medellín, Colombia	1st	800 m	2:08.72
1983	South American Junior Championships	Medellín, Colombia	2nd	4 × 400 m	3:49.91
1983	South American Championships	Santiago, Chile	3rd	400 m	54.8
1983	South American Championships	Santiago, Chile	3rd	800 m	2:07.2
1985	Central American and Caribbean Championships	Nassau, Bahamas	3rd	800 m	2:05.40
1985	South American Championships	Santiago, Chile	1st	400 m	53.25
1985	World Cup	Canberra, Australia	4th	4 × 400 m	3:29.34^{1}
1986	Central American and Caribbean Games	Santiago, Dominican Republic	2nd	400 m	52.46
1986	Central American and Caribbean Games	Santiago, Dominican Republic	6th	800 m	2:09.23
1986	Ibero-American Championships	Havana, Cuba	2nd	400 m	53.38
1986	Ibero-American Championships	Havana, Cuba	5th	800 m	2:06.16
1987	World Indoor Championships	Indianapolis, United States	12th (sf)	200 m	24.76
1987	World Indoor Championships	Indianapolis, United States	14th (h)	400 m	55.36
1987	Central American and Caribbean Championships	Caracas, Venezuela	1st	400 m	51.70
1987	Central American and Caribbean Championships	Caracas, Venezuela	3rd	800 m	2:07.67
1987	Central American and Caribbean Championships	Caracas, Venezuela	1st	4 × 100 m	45.29
1987	Pan American Games	Indianapolis, United States	6th	400 m	52.13
1987	Pan American Games	Indianapolis, United States	8th	800 m	2:09.72
1987	Pan American Games	Indianapolis, United States	4th	4 × 100 m	45.94
1988	Olympic Games	Seoul, South Korea	31st (qf)	200 m	23.96
1988	Olympic Games	Seoul, South Korea	16th (sf)	400 m	52.65
1988	Olympic Games	Seoul, South Korea	–	4 × 400 m	DQ
1989	South American Championships	Medellín, Colombia	1st	400 m	52.10 A
1989	South American Championships	Medellín, Colombia	2nd	4 × 100 m	45.26
1989	South American Championships	Medellín, Colombia	1st	4 × 400 m	3:37.0
1990	Central American and Caribbean Games	Mexico City, Mexico	2nd	200 m	23.75 A
1990	Central American and Caribbean Games	Mexico City, Mexico	2nd	400 m	52.57 A
1990	Central American and Caribbean Games	Mexico City, Mexico	2nd	4 × 100 m	45.29
1991	World Indoor Championships	Seville, Spain	15th (h)	200 m	24.16
1991	World Indoor Championships	Seville, Spain	13th (h)	400 m	54.78
1991	Pan American Games	Havana, Cuba	5th	400 m	51.39
1991	Pan American Games	Havana, Cuba	4th	4 × 100 m	44.68
1991	Pan American Games	Havana, Cuba	4th	4 × 400 m	3:31.39
1991	World Championships	Tokyo, Japan	13th (sf)	400 m	52.40
1992	Ibero-American Championships	Seville, Spain	2nd	100 m	11.72 (-0.8 m/s)
1992	Ibero-American Championships	Seville, Spain	1st	200 m	23.97 (-2.9 m/s)
1992	Ibero-American Championships	Seville, Spain	3rd	4 × 100 m	45:54
1992	Olympic Games	Barcelona, Spain	13th (sf)	400 m	51.75
1993	Central American and Caribbean Championships	Cali, Colombia	1st	400 m	51.33
1993	Central American and Caribbean Championships	Cali, Colombia	3rd	4 × 400 m	3:34.29
1993	World Championships	Stuttgart, Germany	7th (sf)	400 m	51.17
1993	Central American and Caribbean Games	Ponce, Puerto Rico	2nd	4 × 100 m	44.62
1993	Central American and Caribbean Games	Ponce, Puerto Rico	2nd	4 × 400 m	3:36.82
1995	World Championships	Gothenburg, Sweden	26th (h)	400 m	51.96
1995	World Championships	Gothenburg, Sweden	–	4 × 400 m	DNF
1996	Ibero-American Championships	Medellín, Colombia	1st	4 × 400 m	3:33.69
1997	South American Championships	Mar del Plata, Argentina	3rd	400 m	54.47
1997	South American Championships	Mar del Plata, Argentina	1st	4 × 100 m	44.58
1997	South American Championships	Mar del Plata, Argentina	1st	4 × 400 m	3:36.71
1997	World Championships	Athens, Greece	16th (qf)	400 m	51.42
1998	Ibero-American Championships	Lisbon, Portugal	2nd	400 m	51.95
1998	Ibero-American Championships	Lisbon, Portugal	2nd	4 × 400 m	23:33.69
1998	Central American and Caribbean Games	Maracaibo, Venezuela	3rd	400 m	51.52
1998	Central American and Caribbean Games	Maracaibo, Venezuela	2nd	4 × 100 m	44.39
1999	South American Championships	Bogotá, Colombia	1st	400 m	52.92 A
1999	South American Championships	Bogotá, Colombia	1st	4 × 100 m	44.12 A
1999	South American Championships	Bogotá, Colombia	1st	4 × 400 m	3:32.74 A
1999	Pan American Games	Winnipeg, Canada	6th	400 m	53.06
1999	Pan American Games	Winnipeg, Canada	5th	4 × 100 m	43.86
1999	Pan American Games	Winnipeg, Canada	6th	4 × 400 m	3:32.87
Representing Spain
2000	Olympic Games	Sydney, Australia	27th (qf)	400 m	52.63
2000	Olympic Games	Sydney, Australia	17th (h)	4 × 400 m	3:32.45
2001	World Championships	Edmonton, Canada	14th (h)	4 × 400 m	3:33.78

^{1}Representing the Americas

== Personal bests ==
Outdoor

- 100 metres – 11.89 (Castellón 2000)
- 200 metres – 23.37 (+1.8 m/s) (Maracaibo 1989)
- 400 metres – 51.17 (Stuttgart 1993)
- 800 metres – 2:05.23 (Växjö 1986)

Indoor

- 200 metres – 24.16 (Seville 1991)
- 400 metres – 54.78 (Seville 1991)
- 800 metres – 2:09.95 (Seville 1993)
