= Sølvi Olsen Meinseth =

Norwegian sprinter (born 1967)

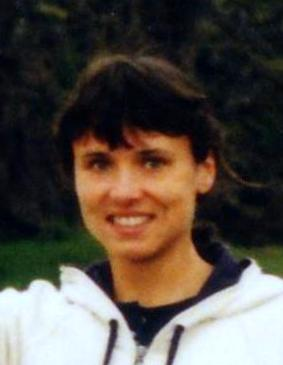
- Sølvi Olsen in 1994

Personal information
- Born: 27 March 1967 (age 59) Rykene, Norway

Sport
- Sport: Athletics
- Events: 60 m, 100 m, 200 m, 400 m
- Club: Lia IL (–1984); Sørild FIK (1985–1986); IL Gular (1988–1990); SK Vidar (1991–1994); Sørild FIK (1995)
Medal record
Representing Norway
Summer Universiade
Silver medal – second place	1991 Sheffield	200 m
Bronze medal – third place	1991 Sheffield	100 m

Sølvi Olsen Meinseth (born 27 March 1967) is a retired Norwegian athlete who competed in sprinting events. She is best known for winning two medals at the 1991 Summer Universiade. In addition, she represented her country at the 1991 World Indoor Championships and 1991 World Championships.

As a junior sprinter she competed on European level. At the 1983 European Junior Championships she reached the semi-final of the 100 metres (12.29) and finished seventh in the 4 × 100 metres relay. At the next edition in 1985 she reached the semi-finals of both the 100 and 200 metres. She also competed in 60 and 200 metres at the 1985 European Indoor Championships, and the 100 and 200 metres at the 1986 European Championships. Only one more international competition in the 1980s followed, the 1989 European Indoor Championships when she did not progress past the heats of the 60 metres.

In 1991 she once again reached the semi-final of an international 200 metres competition, but now at the World Indoor Championships (24.70 seconds). She also ran 7.48 in the 60 metres, competing in the heats. At the World Championships she made her international debut in the 400 metres, placing 16th overall after exiting the semi-finals with a time of 53.63 seconds. The semi final was the third round (as opposite of the second round), and she actually ran faster in the first round, with 52.84 seconds. Olsen also helped running the 4 × 400 metres relay in 3:32.76 minutes. The 1991 Universiade became a great success, as she won the 100 metres bronze medal in 11.61 seconds and the 200 metres silver medal in 23.41 seconds.

The next year she competed at the 1992 European Indoor Championships, reaching the semi-finals of both the 60 metres (7.53) and 200 metres (24.16). In her last major international outing in the 400 metres, she reached the semi-finals at the 1994 European Championships.

Sølvi Olsen Meinseth became national champion numerous times. She won the 100 metres title in 1986, 1988, 1989, 1990, 1991 and 1993 in addition to five silver medals. She won the 200 metres title in 1985, 1986, 1989, 1990, 1991, 1992, 1993, 1994 and 1995 in addition to one silver medal. She won five straight 400 metres titles in 1991–1995.

She married Frank Otto Meinseth, brother of former football international Børre Meinseth. Their son Even and daughter Ingvild are both sprinters, and they are both coaches.

== Personal bests ==
Outdoor

- 100 metres – 11.61 (1991)
- 200 metres – 23.41 (1991)
- 400 metres – 52.45 (Bergen 1991) NR
- 4 x 400 metres relay – 3:32.76 (Tokyo 1991) NR
- Swedish relay – 2:06.92 (Portsmouth 1993) NR

Indoor

- 60 metres – 7.45 (Luleå 1991), former NR
- 200 metres – 23.84 (Genoa 1992)
