= Judit Forgács =

Hungarian sprinter

Personal information
- Born: 25 May 1959 (age 67) Budapest, Hungary
- Height: 1.68 m (5 ft 6 in)
- Weight: 58 kg (128 lb)

Sport
- Sport: Athletics
- Event: 400 metres
- Club: TFSE; Tatabányai SC
Medal record
Representing Hungary
World Indoor Championships
Bronze medal – third place	1987 Rome	400 m
European Indoor Championships
Bronze medal – third place	1990 Glasgow	400 m

Judit Forgács (born 25 May 1959) is a Hungarian former sprinter who specialised in the 400 metres. She won bronze medals at the 1987 World Indoor Championships and 1990 European Indoor Championships. In addition she competed at the 1980 and 1992 Summer Olympics.

== International competitions ==
Year	Competition	Venue	Position	Event	Notes
Representing Hungary
1977	European Junior Championships	Donetsk, Soviet Union	5th	400 m	54.87
1977	European Junior Championships	Donetsk, Soviet Union	6th	4 × 400 m relay	3:41.7
1980	Olympic Games	Moscow, Soviet Union	26th (h)	400 m	53.06
1980	Olympic Games	Moscow, Soviet Union	5th	4 × 400 m relay	3:27.9
1981	Universiade	Bucharest, Romania	4th	400 m	52.61
1982	European Championships	Athens, Greece	8th	400 m	52.49
1983	European Indoor Championships	Budapest, Hungary	4th	400 m	53.86
1983	World Championships	Helsinki, Finland	15th (sf)	400 m	52.74
1987	European Indoor Championships	Liévin, France	5th	400 m	52.87
1987	World Indoor Championships	Indianapolis, United States	3rd	400 m	52.68
1987	World Championships	Rome, Italy	21st (sf)	400 m	52.99
1987	World Championships	Rome, Italy	13th (h)	4 × 400 m relay	3:31.56
1988	European Indoor Championships	Budapest, Hungary	10th (sf)	400 m	53.16
1989	World Indoor Championships	Budapest, Hungary	12th (sf)	400 m	53.86
1989	World Cup	Barcelona, Spain	–	4 × 400 m relay	DQ^{1}
1990	European Indoor Championships	Glasgow, United Kingdom	3rd	400 m	53.02
1990	European Championships	Split, Yugoslavia	11th (sf)	400 m	52.77
1990	European Championships	Split, Yugoslavia	7th	4 × 400 m relay	3:32.30
1991	World Championships	Tokyo, Japan	21st (qf)	400 m	53.79
1991	World Championships	Tokyo, Japan	8th	4 × 400 m relay	3:29.07
1992	Olympic Games	Barcelona, Spain	31st (qf)	400 m	54.24
1992	Olympic Games	Barcelona, Spain	11th (h)	4 × 400 m relay	3:33.81

^{1}Representing Europe

== Personal bests ==
Outdoor

- 100 metres – 11.95 (Budapest 1983)
- 200 metres – 23.46 (Sofia 1983)
- 400 metres – 51.55 (Budapest 1983)

Indoor

- 60 metres – 7.54 (Budapest 1984)
- 200 metres – 23.78 (Budapest 1987)
- 400 metres – 52.29 (Budapest 1987)
