= Athletics at the 1987 Pan American Games – Women's 400 metres =

Women's 400 metres at the Pan American Games

The women's 400 metres event at the 1987 Pan American Games was held in Indianapolis, United States on 12 and 13 August.

== Medalists ==
Gold	Silver	Bronze
Ana Fidelia Quirot; Cuba	Jillian Richardson; Canada	Denean Howard; United States

== Results ==
=== Heats ===
Rank	Heat	Name	Nationality	Time	Notes
1	1	Ana Fidelia Quirot	Cuba	50.12	Q, GR
2	3	Diane Dixon	United States	51.56	Q
3	3	Jillian Richardson	Canada	51.69	Q
4	2	Denean Howard	United States	51.83	Q
5	2	Sandie Richards	Jamaica	52.12	Q
6	2	Norfalia Carabalí	Colombia	52.14	q
7	2	Marita Payne	Canada	52.38	q
8	1	Maria Magnólia Figueiredo	Brazil	52.49	Q
9	1	Cathy Rattray-Williams	Jamaica	52.62	
10	2	Maria Bortolocci	Brazil	54.51	
11	3	Soledad Acerenza	Uruguay	55.30	
12	1	Deborah Ross	Barbados	55.71	
13	1	Olga Escalante	Colombia	55.89	
14	3	Danyel Simmons	Barbados	56.81	
15	2	Virginia Guerra	Uruguay	58.98	
	3	Maureen Stewart	Costa Rica	DNS	

=== Final ===
Rank	Name	Nationality	Time	Notes
1st place, gold medalist(s)	Ana Fidelia Quirot	Cuba	50.27	
2nd place, silver medalist(s)	Jillian Richardson	Canada	50.35	
3rd place, bronze medalist(s)	Denean Howard	United States	50.72	
4	Diane Dixon	United States	50.79	
5	Maria Magnólia Figueiredo	Brazil	51.93	
6	Norfalia Carabalí	Colombia	52.13	
7	Marita Payne	Canada	52.14	
8	Sandie Richards	Jamaica	52.89	
