= 1992 European Athletics Indoor Championships – Women's 400 metres =

The women's 400 metres event at the 1992 European Athletics Indoor Championships was held in Palasport di Genova on 29 February and 1 March.

== Medalists ==
Gold	Silver	Bronze
Sandra Myers; Spain	Olga Bryzgina; Unified Team	Yelena Golesheva; Unified Team

== Results ==
=== Heats ===
First 2 from each heat (Q) and the next 2 fastest (q) qualified for the final.

Rank	Heat	Name	Nationality	Time	Notes
1	2	Olga Bryzgina	Unified Team	52.29	Q
2	2	Yelena Golesheva	Unified Team	52.64	Q
3	1	Marina Shmonina	Unified Team	52.67	Q
4	2	Sandra Myers	Spain	52.85	q
5	1	Julia Merino	Spain	52.87	Q
6	1	Iolanda Oanta	Romania	52.96	q
7	2	Irmgard Trojer	Italy	53.27	

=== Final ===
Rank	Name	Nationality	Time	Notes
1st place, gold medalist(s)	Sandra Myers	Spain	51.21	WL
2nd place, silver medalist(s)	Olga Bryzgina	Unified Team	51.48	
3rd place, bronze medalist(s)	Yelena Golesheva	Unified Team	52.07	
4	Julia Merino	Spain	52.22	PB
5	Marina Shmonina	Unified Team	52.26	
	Iolanda Oanta	Romania	DNS	
