= 1993 World Championships in Athletics – Women's 400 metres =

These are the official results of the Women's 400 metres event at the 1993 IAAF World Championships in Stuttgart, Germany. There were a total of 37 participating athletes, with five qualifying heats and the final held on Tuesday 1993-08-17.

== Final ==
RANK	FINAL	TIME
	Jearl Miles (USA)	49.82
	Natasha Kaiser-Brown (USA)	50.17
	Sandie Richards (JAM)	50.44
4.	Tatyana Alekseyeva (RUS)	50.52
5.	Ximena Restrepo (COL)	50.91
6.	Sandra Myers (ESP)	51.22
7.	Juliet Campbell (JAM)	51.40
—	Norfalia Carabalí (COL)	DSQ

== Semifinals ==
- Held on Monday 1993-08-16

RANK	HEAT 1	TIME
1.	Natasha Kaiser-Brown (USA)	50.41
2.	Tatyana Alekseyeva (RUS)	50.49
3.	Juliet Campbell (JAM)	50.89
4.	Norfalia Carabalí (COL)	51.17
5.	Aelita Yurchenko (UKR)	51.55
6.	Inez Turner (JAM)	52.25
7.	Anja Rucker (GER)	52.32
8.	Aissatou Tandian (SEN)	52.77

RANK	HEAT 2	TIME
1.	Jearl Miles (USA)	50.45
2.	Sandie Richards (JAM)	50.65
3.	Sandra Myers (ESP)	50.83
4.	Ximena Restrepo (COL)	50.89
5.	Yelena Ruzina (RUS)	51.14
6.	Linda Keough (GBR)	52.56
7.	Michele Collins (USA)	52.60
8.	Francine Landre (FRA)	52.72

== Qualifying heats ==
- Held on Monday 1993-08-15

RANK	HEAT 1	TIME
1.	Tatyana Alekseyeva (RUS)	50.88
2.	Sandie Richards (JAM)	51.01
3.	Naděžda Koštovalová (CZE)	52.69
4.	Elsa Devassoigne (FRA)	52.81
5.	Regula Zürcher (SUI)	52.84
6.	Guilhermina da Cruz (ANG)	55.34
7.	Nadjina Kaltouma (CHA)	59.76

RANK	HEAT 2	TIME
1.	Natasha Kaiser-Brown (USA)	51.80
2.	Yelena Ruzina (RUS)	52.23
3.	Linda Keough (GBR)	52.61
4.	Dora Kyriakou (CYP)	54.49
5.	Lorie Ann Adams (GUY)	55.54
6.	Shermaine Ross (GRN)	55.80
7.	Yaznee Nasheeda (MDV)	1:07.87
–	Nve Ruth Mangue (GEQ)	DNS

RANK	HEAT 3	TIME
1.	Ximena Restrepo (COL)	51.59
2.	Sandra Myers (ESP)	51.77
3.	Aelita Yurchenko (UKR)	52.22
4.	Noodang Phimphoo (THA)	54.01
5.	Denise Ouabangui (CAF)	57.18
6.	Lasnet Nkouka (CGO)	57.95
–	Grace Birungi (UGA)	DNS

RANK	HEAT 4	TIME
1.	Norfalia Carabalí (COL)	51.65
2.	Juliet Campbell (JAM)	51.76
3.	Michele Collins (USA)	52.03
4.	Aissatou Tandian (SEN)	52.59
5.	Yana Burtasenkova (MDA)	53.12
6.	Manda Kanoute (MLI)	55.72
7.	Rachelle Godonou (BEN)	1:03.39

RANK	HEAT 5	TIME
1.	Jearl Miles (USA)	51.24
2.	Inez Turner (JAM)	52.04
3.	Anja Rucker (GER)	52.10
4.	Francine Landre (FRA)	52.53
5.	Camille Noel (CAN)	53.11
6.	Mary-Estelle Kapalu (VAN)	56.06
7.	Mirna El-Laz (LIB)	59.76
–	Lyudmila Dzhigalova (UKR)	DNS

== See also ==
- 1990 Women's European Championships 400 metres (Split)
- 1991 Women's World Championships 400 metres (Tokyo)
- 1992 Women's Olympic 400 metres (Barcelona)
- 1994 Women's European Championships 400 metres (Helsinki)
- 1995 Women's World Championships 400 metres (Gothenburg)
