= Athletics at the 1987 Pan American Games – Women's 4 × 400 metres relay =

Women's 4 × 400 metres relay at the Pan American Games

The women's 4 × 400 metres relay event at the 1987 Pan American Games was held in Indianapolis, United States on 16 August.

== Results ==
Rank	Nation	Athletes	Time	Notes
1st place, gold medalist(s)	United States	Rochelle Stevens, Denean Howard, Valerie Brisco-Hooks, Diane Dixon	3:23.35	GR
2nd place, silver medalist(s)	Canada	Charmaine Crooks, Marita Payne, Molly Killingbeck, Jillian Richardson	3:29.18	
3rd place, bronze medalist(s)	Jamaica	Cathy Rattray, Vivienne Spence, Ilrey Oliver, Sandie Richards	3:29.50	
4	Cuba	Ester Petitón, Mercedes Álvarez, Tania Fernández, Ana Fidelia Quirot	3:29.70	NR
5	Ecuador	Ingrid Rosero, Adriana Andrade, Nancy Vallecilla, Liliana Chala	3:49.74	NR
6	Uruguay	Margarita Martirena, Virginia Guerra, Soledad Acerenza, Claudia Acerenza	3:53.76	
	United States Virgin Islands		DNS	
