= 1991 IAAF World Indoor Championships – Women's 200 metres =

The women's 200 metres event at the 1991 IAAF World Indoor Championships was held on 9 and 10 March.

== Medalists ==
Gold	Silver	Bronze
Merlene Ottey; Jamaica	Irina Sergeyeva; Soviet Union	Grit Breuer; Germany

== Results ==
=== Heats ===
First 2 of each heat (Q) and next 2 fastest (q) qualified for the semifinals.

Rank	Heat	Name	Nationality	Time	Notes
1	5	Andrea Thomas	Germany	22.95	Q
2	3	Merlene Ottey	Jamaica	23.30	Q
3	2	Irina Sergeyeva	Soviet Union	23.35	Q
4	1	Grit Breuer	Germany	23.49	Q
5	1	Fabienne Ficher	France	23.56	Q
5	5	Sisko Hanhijoki	Finland	23.56	Q, NR
7	1	Celena Mondie-Milner	United States	23.64	q
8	5	Renata Kubalová	Czechoslovakia	23.73	q, PB
9	3	Angela Williams	Trinidad and Tobago	23.75	Q
10	4	Galina Malchugina	Soviet Union	23.77	Q
11	2	Pauline Davis	Bahamas	23.78	Q
12	5	Wang Huei-chen	Chinese Taipei	23.81	AR
13	4	Sølvi Olsen	Norway	24.01	Q, NR
14	2	Monika Špičková	Czechoslovakia	24.06	
15	1	Norfalia Carabalí	Colombia	24.16	
16	5	France Gareau	Canada	24.18	
17	4	Karen Clarke	Canada	24.28	
18	2	Tian Yumei	China	25.04	NR
19	2	Claudia Acerenza	Uruguay	25.69	
20	1	Juana Mejía	Dominican Republic	26.34	
	3	Mamaissata Cisse	Guinea	DQ	
	3	Rochelle Stevens	United States	DNS	
	3	Lasnet Nkouka	Republic of the Congo	DNS	
	4	Juliet Cuthbert	Jamaica	DNS	

=== Semifinals ===
First 3 of each semifinal (Q) qualified directly for the final.

Rank	Heat	Name	Nationality	Time	Notes
1	1	Merlene Ottey	Jamaica	22.64	Q
2	2	Irina Sergeyeva	Soviet Union	22.86	Q
3	1	Andrea Thomas	Germany	22.98	Q
4	1	Galina Malchugina	Soviet Union	23.07	Q
5	2	Grit Breuer	Germany	23.10	Q
6	2	Sisko Hanhijoki	Finland	23.55	Q, NR
7	1	Pauline Davis	Bahamas	23.58	
8	2	Fabienne Ficher	France	23.63	
9	1	Angela Williams	Trinidad and Tobago	23.66	
10	2	Celena Mondie-Milner	United States	23.73	
11	1	Renata Kubalová	Czechoslovakia	23.74	
12	2	Sølvi Olsen	Norway	24.70	

=== Final ===
Rank	Lane	Name	Nationality	Time	Notes
1st place, gold medalist(s)	4	Merlene Ottey	Jamaica	22.24	=WR
2nd place, silver medalist(s)	6	Irina Sergeyeva	Soviet Union	22.41	NR
3rd place, bronze medalist(s)	3	Grit Breuer	Germany	22.58	WJR
4	5	Andrea Thomas	Germany	22.94	
5	2	Galina Malchugina	Soviet Union	23.20	
6	1	Sisko Hanhijoki	Finland	24.10	
