= Lasnet Nkouka =

Congolese sprinter

Personal information
- Nationality: Congolese
- Born: Lasnet Lellise Nkouka; 28 January 1970 (age 55) Bacongo (Congo Brazzaville)

Sport
- Sport: Sprinting
- Event: 400 metres

Lasnet Lelisse Nkouka (born 28 January 1970) is a Congolese sprinter. She set national records for the Republic of Congo and was a regional champion in France despite being banned from international competition while fighting deportation. She competed in the women's 400 metres at the 1988 Summer Olympics.

== Career ==
At only the age of 16, Nkouka was selected to represent the Republic of the Congo at the 1988 Summer Olympics, seeded in the 5th heat of the 400 metres. She ran 57.19 seconds to finish 7th, failing to advance.

Nkouka competed at the indoor and outdoor world championships in 1991. At the 1991 IAAF World Indoor Championships in Seville, she placed 6th in her 400 metres heat in 58.50 seconds. Nkouka also entered in the 200 m and 800 m, but did not start those events. At the outdoor championships in Tokyo, Nkouka finished 7th in her 400 m heat in 57.85 seconds.

Nkouke entered in both the 200 m and 400 m at the 1993 World Championships in Athletics in Stuttgart, Germany. She finished 6th in her heat in both events, running 26.64 seconds and 57.95 seconds respectively.

Nkouke traveled with the Congolese team to the 1994 Francophone Games in Bondoufle, but she did not compete in the athletics events.

On 19 February 1995 in Bordeaux, Nkouka ran a Republic of the Congo national indoor record in the 400 m of 56.07 seconds.

After moving to France, Nkouka became the Île-de-France champion over 800 metres. She competed in the 1995 and 1996 French Athletics Championships.

In 1996, Nkouka ran a 400 m personal best of 54.48 seconds.

As of 1997, Nkouka held the Republic of the Congo national record in the outdoor 400 m with a time of 54.45 seconds.

== Personal life ==
The 400 m and 800 m were Nkouka's favorite distances. Nkouka's uncle is Jean-Claude N'Ganga, member of the International Olympic Committee and president of the Congolese National Olympic and Sports Committee.

Nkouka lived in the Republic of Congo, but after the 1994 Francophone Games, she decided to stay in France, negotiating for a visa and staying with her sister in Paris. Nkouka said that she moved because she lacked competition in Africa, but her request for a long-term visa was denied. Still staying in France, she was not able to contact her family in Congo while awaiting deportation as of 1997, and was banned from international competition.

She trained with the Entente Athlétique Saint-Quentin-en-Yvelines club in Yvelines while being coached by Stéphane Cavillier.
