= 1987 IAAF World Indoor Championships – Women's 400 metres =

The women's 400 metres event at the 1987 IAAF World Indoor Championships was held at the Hoosier Dome in Indianapolis on 6 and 8 March.

== Medalists ==
Gold	Silver	Bronze
Sabine Busch; East Germany	Lillie Leatherwood; United States	Judit Forgács; Hungary

== Results ==
=== Heats ===
The first 2 of each heat (Q) and next 4 fastest (q) qualified for the semifinals.

Rank	Heat	Name	Nationality	Time	Notes
1	2	Rositsa Stamenova	Bulgaria	53.47	Q
2	4	Sabine Busch	East Germany	53.50	Q
3	4	Olga Nazarova	Soviet Union	53.68	Q
4	2	Esmie Lawrence	Canada	53.74	Q
5	3	Judit Forgács	Hungary	53.80	Q
6	2	Airat Bakare	Nigeria	53.83	q, NR
7	4	Cristina Pérez	Spain	53.84	q
8	3	Marzena Wojdecka	Poland	54.13	Q
9	1	Petra Müller	East Germany	54.40	Q
10	1	Lillie Leatherwood	United States	54.69	Q
11	3	Marina Stepanova	Soviet Union	54.78	q
12	1	Charmaine Crooks	Canada	55.00	q
13	3	Janice Kelly	Saint Kitts and Nevis	55.20	NR
14	4	Norfalia Carabalí	Colombia	55.36	AR
15	2	Josephine Mary Singarayar	Malaysia	56.05	AR
16	1	Kehinde Vaughan	Nigeria	56.72	
17	1	Esther Kavaya	Kenya	58.23	
18	4	Adriana Martínez	Ecuador	59.02	NR
19	4	Rowan Maynard	Antigua and Barbuda	59.75	
	2	Ana María Luzio	Bolivia	DNS	
	3	Nawal El Moutawakel	Morocco	DNS	

=== Semifinals ===
First 3 of each semifinal (Q) qualified directly for the final.

Rank	Heat	Name	Nationality	Time	Notes
1	2	Sabine Busch	East Germany	52.27	Q
2	1	Rositsa Stamenova	Bulgaria	52.69	Q
3	2	Lillie Leatherwood	United States	52.74	Q
4	1	Judit Forgács	Hungary	52.83	Q
5	1	Esmie Lawrence	Canada	52.85	Q
6	2	Olga Nazarova	Soviet Union	52.88	Q
7	2	Petra Müller	East Germany	52.92	
8	1	Marzena Wojdecka	Poland	53.27	
9	2	Cristina Pérez	Spain	53.36	
10	1	Charmaine Crooks	Canada	53.53	
11	2	Airat Bakare	Nigeria	54.12	
	1	Marina Stepanova	Soviet Union	DNS	

=== Final ===
Rank	Lane	Name	Nationality	Time	Notes
1st place, gold medalist(s)	4	Sabine Busch	East Germany	51.66	CR
2nd place, silver medalist(s)	5	Lillie Leatherwood	United States	52.54	PB
3rd place, bronze medalist(s)	2	Judit Forgács	Hungary	52.68	
4	6	Olga Nazarova	Soviet Union	52.76	
5	3	Rositsa Stamenova	Bulgaria	53.56	
6	1	Esmie Lawrence	Canada	54.38	
