= 1987 World Championships in Athletics – Women's 4 × 400 metres relay =

Championship

The 4 × 400 metres relay at the 1987 World Championships in Athletics was held at the Stadio Olimpico on September 5 and September 6.

== Medals ==
Gold:	Silver:	Bronze:
East Germany; Dagmar Neubauer; Kirsten Emmelmann; Petra Muller; Sabine Busch; Cornelia Ullrich*	Soviet Union; Aelita Yurchenko; Olga Nazarova; Mariya Pinigina; Olga Bryzgina	United States; Diane Dixon; Denean Howard; Valerie Brisco-Hooks; Lillie Leatherwood

Note: * Indicates athletes who ran in preliminary rounds.

== Results ==
All times shown are in minutes.

AR area record | CR championship record | GR games record | NR national record | OR Olympic record | PB personal best | SB season best | WL world leading (in a given season)
DNS = did not start | DQ = disqualification | NM = no mark (i.e. no valid result) | Q = qualification by place in heat | q = qualification by overall place

=== Final ===
Rank	Team	Name	Result	Notes
Gold medal	East Germany	Dagmar Neubauer, Kirsten Emmelmann, Petra Muller, Sabine Busch	3:18.63	CR
Silver medal	Soviet Union	Aelita Yurchenko, Olga Nazarova, Mariya Pinigina, Olga Bryzgina	3:19.50	
Bronze medal	United States	Diane Dixon, Denean Howard, Valerie Brisco-Hooks, Lillie Leatherwood	3:21.04	
4	Canada	Charmaine Crooks, Molly Killingbeck, Marita Payne-Wiggins, Jillian Richardson	3:24.11	
5	West Germany	Ute Thimm, Helga Arendt, Gudrun Abt, Gisela Kinzel	3:24.94	
6	Jamaica	Cathy Rattray-Williams, Sandra Farmer, Ilrey Oliver, Sandie Richards	3:27.51	
7	France	Nathalie Simon, Nadine Debois, Hélène Huart, Fabienne Ficher	3:27.60	
8	Bulgaria	Tsvetanka Ilieva, Rositsa Stamenova, Pepa Pavlova, Yuliana Marinova	3:30.24	

=== Heats ===
==== Heat 1 ====
Rank	Team	Name	Result	Notes
1	Soviet Union	Aelita Yurchenko, Olga Nazarova, Mariya Pinigina, Olga Bryzgina	3:20.75	Q
2	United States	Diane Dixon, Denean Howard, Valerie Brisco-Hooks, Lillie Leatherwood	3:22.32	Q
3	Canada	Charmaine Crooks, Molly Killingbeck, Marita Payne-Wiggins, Jillian Richardson	3:24.50	Q
4	France	Nathalie Simon, Nadine Debois, Hélène Huart, Fabienne Ficher	3:27.76	q
5	Cuba	Ester Petitón, Odalys Hernandez, Tania Fernández, Ana Fidelia Quirot	3:29.78	
6	Kenya	Geraldine Shitandayi, Florence Wanjiru, Esther Kavaya, Francisca Chepkurui	3:30.16	
7	Brazil	Suzete Montalvão, Maria do Carmo Fialho, Soraya Vieira Telles, Maria Magnólia Souza Figueiredo	3:30.91	AR
8	India	Vandana Shanbag, Vandana Rao, Shiny Wilson, P.T. Usha	3:31.55	AR

==== Heat 2 ====
Rank	Team	Name	Result	Notes
1	East Germany	Kirsten Emmelmann, Dagmar Neubauer, Cornelia Ullrich, Petra Muller	3:22.97	Q
2	Bulgaria	Malena Andonova, Rositsa Stamenova, Pepa Pavlova, Yuliana Marinova	3:25.85	Q
3	West Germany	Karin Lix, Helga Arendt, Gudrun Abt, Gisela Kinzel	3:26.75	Q
4	Jamaica	Cathy Rattray-Williams, Sandie Richards, Sandra Farmer, Ilrey Oliver	3:27.13	q
5	Hungary	Erzsebet Szabo, Erika Szopori, Noémi Bátori, Judit Forgács	3:31.56	
6	Italy	Rossana Morabito, Cosetta Campana, Nevia Pistrino, Erica Rossi	3:31.72	
7	Spain	Rosa Colorado, Cristina Pérez, Montserrat Pujol, Blanca Lacambra	3:32.01	
8	Ireland	Michelle Walsh-Carroll, Barbara Johnson, Patricia Walsh, Patricia Amond	3:32.56	
