= 1994 European Athletics Championships – Women's 4 × 400 metres relay =

Women's 4 × 400 metres relay at the European Athletics Championships

The women's 4 × 400 metres relay event at the 1994 European Athletics Championships was held in Helsinki, Finland, at Helsinki Olympic Stadium on 13 and 14 August 1994.

== Medalists ==
Gold	Francine Landre; Viviane Dorsile; Évelyne Élien; Marie-José Pérec; France
Silver	Natalya Khrushchelyova; Yelena Andreyeva; Tatyana Zakharova; Svetlana Goncharenko; Russia
Bronze	Karin Janke; Uta Rohländer; Heike Meißner; Anja Rücker; Germany

== Results ==
=== Final ===
14 August

Rank	Nation	Competitors	Time	Notes
1st place, gold medalist(s)	France	Francine Landre; Viviane Dorsile; Évelyne Élien; Marie-José Pérec	3:22.34	NR
2nd place, silver medalist(s)	Russia	Natalya Khrushchelyova; Yelena Andreyeva; Tatyana Zakharova; Svetlana Goncharenko	3:24.06	
3rd place, bronze medalist(s)	Germany	Karin Janke; Uta Rohländer; Heike Meißner; Anja Rücker	3:24.10	
4	Great Britain	Melanie Neef; Linda Keough; Phylis Smith; Sally Gunnell	3:24.14	
5	Czech Republic	Nadezda Kostovalová; Hana Benešová; Erika Suchovská; Ludmila Formanová	3:27.95	
6	Switzerland	Regula Anliker-Aebi; Kathrin Lüthi; Martha Grossenbacher; Anita Protti	3:28.78	
7	Poland	Barbara Grzywocz; Monika Warnicka; Sylwia Pachut; Elżbieta Kilińska	3:29.75	
8	Finland	Aila Haikkonen; Heidi Suomi; Satu Jääskeläinen; Sonja Finell	3:32.97	

=== Heats ===
13 August

==== Heat 1 ====
Rank	Nation	Competitors	Time	Notes
1	Great Britain	Melanie Neef; Linda Keough; Phylis Smith; Sally Gunnell	3:27.25	Q
2	Germany	Karin Janke; Uta Rohländer; Linda Kisabaka; Anja Rücker	3:27.50	Q
3	Switzerland	Michèle Schenk; Kathrin Lüthi; Martha Grossenbacher; Anita Protti	3:31.15	Q
4	Finland	Aila Haikkonen; Heidi Suomi; Satu Jääskeläinen; Sonja Finell	3:31.78	q
5	Poland	Barbara Grzywocz; Monika Warnicka; Sylwia Pachut; Elżbieta Kilińska	3:32.20	q

==== Heat 2 ====
Rank	Nation	Competitors	Time	Notes
1	France	Marie-Line Scholent; Viviane Dorsile; Évelyne Élien; Francine Landre	3:29.46	Q
2	Russia	Yelena Golesheva; Natalya Khrushchelyova; Tatyana Zakharova; Yelena Andreyeva	3:29.51	Q
3	Czech Republic	Nadezda Kostovalová; Helena Dziurová; Hana Benešová; Ludmila Formanová	3:30.91	Q
4	Sweden	Monica Westén; Emma Holmqvist; Maria Staafgård; Charlotta Johansson	3:32.36	NR
5	Italy	Francesca Carbone; Patrizia Spuri; Virna De Angeli; Danielle Perpoli	3:33.31	

== Participation ==
According to an unofficial count, 44 athletes from 10 countries participated in the event.

- Czech Republic (5)
- Finland (4)
- France (5)
- Germany (5)
- Great Britain (4)
- Italy (4)
- Poland (4)
- Russia (5)
- Sweden (4)
- Switzerland (5)
