= Cheryl Allen (sprinter) =

Canadian sprinter (born 1972)

Personal information
- Born: 8 March 1972 (age 54) Greater Sudbury, Canada

Sport
- Sport: Track and field
Medal record
Representing Canada
Commonwealth Games
Bronze medal – third place	1990 Auckland	4x400m relay

Cheryl Allen (born 8 March 1972) is a Canadian retired sprinter who specialized in the 400 metres.

Allen had an illustrious junior career, winning the 1989 and 1991 Pan American Junior Championships. She also achieved the rare feat of competing in three World Junior Championships. She never reached the final of the 400 metres, neither in 1986, 1988 or 1990. In the 4 × 400 metres relay she finished fourth in 1986 and 1988 and did not reach the final in 1990. Her six event participations at the World Junior Championships were unmatched for many years.

Together with Rosey Edeh, France Gareau and Gail Harris she won a bronze medal in the 4 × 400 metres relay at the 1990 Commonwealth Games. Together with Rosey Edeh, Karen Clarke and Charmaine Crooks she finished sixth in the 4 × 400 metres relay at the 1991 World Championships. She also competed at the 400 metres, reaching the quarter-final.

Allen was later an All-American sprinter for the UNLV Rebels track and field team, finishing 5th in the 4 × 400 m relay at the 1994 NCAA Division I Indoor Track and Field Championships.
