= Viktor Ryzhenkov =

Uzbekistani pole vaulter (born 1966)

Medal record

Men's athletics

Representing the Soviet Union

IAAF World Indoor Championships
Silver medal – second place	1991 Seville	Pole vault

Viktor Ryzhenkov (born 25 August 1966) is an Uzbekistani former track and field athlete who competed for the Soviet Union in the pole vault. His career briefly flourished around 1990 and 1991.

He entered the ranking of the top ten athletes in the world in the 1990 season, setting a best of 5.80 m (19 ft 1/4 in). Following a second-place finish at the Soviet Indoor Athletics Championships, Ryzhenkov was then chosen to represent the Soviet Union at the 1991 IAAF World Indoor Championships. On his first major appearance he claimed the silver medal with a vault of 5.80 m (19 ft 1/4 in), beaten only by his more illustrious compatriot Sergey Bubka.

Later that month in San Sebastián he cleared a new best of 5.91 m (19 ft 4 1/2 in), while finishing runner-up to Bubka again, who broke the world record. Ryzhenkov's mark made him the second best performer in the world that indoor season. He continued to compete on the circuit alongside Bubka and placed third in Malmö while his countryman again broke the world record.

Ryzhenkov's personal best ranks him within the top twenty all-time performers in the indoor pole vault. He did not compete internationally after the dissolution of the Soviet Union at the end of 1991.
