= Olga Nazarova =

Soviet sprinter

Medal record

Women's athletics

Olympic Games

Representing Soviet Union
Gold medal – first place	1988 Seoul	4 × 400 m relay
Bronze medal – third place	1988 Seoul	400 m

Representing the Unified Team
Gold medal – first place	1992 Barcelona	4 × 400 m relay

World Championships

Representing Soviet Union
Gold medal – first place	1991 Tokyo	4 × 400 m relay
Silver medal – second place	1987 Rome	4 × 400 m relay

Olga Vladimirovna Nazarova (Ольга Владимировна Назарова; born 1 June 1965) is a Russian former track and field athlete who competed mainly in the 400 metres. She represented the Soviet Union. She won two Olympic gold medals in the 4 × 400 metres relay, in 1988 and 1992. Her 1988 split time of 47.8, remains one of the fastest relay splits of all-time. She also won World Championship gold (1991) and silver (1987) in the relay, and a 1988 Olympic bronze medal in the 400 metres.

== Career ==
Nazarova competed for the Soviet Union at the 1987 World Championships in Rome, finishing eighth in the 400 metres final and winning a silver medal in the 4 × 400 m relay, with 400 m gold medallist Olga Bryzgina, Aelita Yurchenko and Mariya Pinigina. She went on to compete for the Soviet Union at the 1988 Summer Olympics held in Seoul, winning the bronze medal in the 400 metres. She then joined with gold medalist Olga Bryzgina, 400 m hurdles silver medalist Tatyana Ledovskaya and Mariya Pinigina to win gold in the 4 × 400 m relay. That USSR relay team set a new world record of 3:15.17 minutes which is still unbeaten (as of 2023).

Nazarova competed only in the relay at the 1991 World Championships, winning a gold medal, along with Bryzgina, Ledovskaya and Lyudmila Dzhigalova. She competed for the Commonwealth of Independent States at the 1992 Summer Olympics held in Barcelona, finishing fourth in the 400 m final. In the 4 × 400 metres, she won the gold medal, along with Bryzgina (who had this time won the silver medal in the 400 m), Dzhigalova and Yelena Ruzina.

== International competitions ==
Year	Competition	Venue	Position	Event	Notes
Representing Soviet Union
1986	European Championships	Stuttgart, Germany	semi-final	400 m	52.11
1986	European Championships	Stuttgart, Germany	—	4 × 400 m	DQ
1987	World Indoor Championships	Indianapolis, United States	4th	400 m	52.76
1987	World Championships	Rome, Italy	8th	400 m	51.20
1987	World Championships	Rome, Italy	2nd	4 × 400 m	3:19.50
1988	Olympic Games	Seoul, South Korea	3rd	400 m	49.90
1988	Olympic Games	Seoul, South Korea	1st	4 × 400 m	3:15.17 WR
1991	World Championships	Tokyo, Japan	1st	4 × 400 m	3:18.43
Representing Unified Team
1992	Olympic Games	Barcelona, Spain	4th	400 m	49.69
1992	Olympic Games	Barcelona, Spain	1st	4 × 400 m	3:20.20
1995	World Championships	Gothenburg, Sweden	18th (sf)	400 m	51.83

Note: The Soviet Union originally finished 2nd in the 4 × 400 m at the 1986 European Championships, before being disqualified for a lane infringement.

== See also ==
- List of Olympic medalists in athletics (women)
- List of 1988 Summer Olympics medal winners
- List of 1992 Summer Olympics medal winners
- List of World Athletics Championships medalists (women)
- List of Russian sportspeople
- 400 metres at the Olympics
- 4 × 400 metres relay at the Olympics
