= 1989 IAAF World Cup =

Track and field sporting event

The 5th IAAF World Cup in Athletics was an international track and field sporting event sponsored by the International Association of Athletics Federations, held on September 8–10, 1989, at the Estadi Olímpic Lluís Companys in Barcelona, Spain.

== Overall results ==
=== Men ===
| Pos. | Team | Result |
|---|---|---|
| 1 | United States | 133 |
| 2 | Europe | 127 |
| 3 | Great Britain | 119 |
| 4 | East Germany | 116,5 |
| 5 | Africa | 107 |
| 6 | America | 97 |
| 7 | Asia | 68,5 |
| 8 | Spain | 64,5 |
| 8 | Oceania | 64,5 |

=== Women ===
| Pos. | Team | Result |
|---|---|---|
| 1 | East Germany | 124 |
| 2 | Soviet Union | 106 |
| 3 | Americas | 94 |
| 4 | Europe | 89 |
| 5 | United States | 84,5 |
| 6 | Asia | 67,5 |
| 7 | Africa | 58 |
| 8 | Spain | 48 |
| 9 | Oceania | 40 |

== Medal summary ==
=== Men ===
| Event | Gold | | Silver | | Bronze | |
|---|---|---|---|---|---|---|
| 100 metres | Linford Christie (GBR); Great Britain | 10.10 | Leroy Burrell (USA); United States | 10.15 | Daniel Sangouma (FRA); Europe | 10.17 |
| 200 metres | Robson da Silva (BRA); Americas | 20.00 | Floyd Heard (USA); United States | 20.36 | Olapade Adeniken (NGR); Africa | 20.38 |
| 400 metres | Roberto Hernández (CUB); Americas | 44.58 | Jens Carlowitz (GDR); East Germany | 44.86 | Gabriel Tiacoh (CIV); Africa | 44.97 |
| 800 metres | Tom McKean (GBR); Great Britain | 1:44.95 | Jens-Peter Herold (GDR); East Germany | 1:45.04 | Nixon Kiprotich (KEN); Africa | 1:45.08 |
| 1500 metres | Abdi Bile (SOM)} Africa | 3:35.56 | Sebastian Coe (GBR); Great Britain | 3:35.79 | Jens-Peter Herold (GDR); East Germany | 3:35.87 |
| 5000 metres | Saïd Aouita (MAR); Africa | 13:23.14 | John Doherty (IRL); Europe | 13:25.39 | José Luis Carreira (ESP); Spain | 13:25.94 |
| 10,000 metres | Salvatore Antibo (ITA); Europe | 28:05.26 | Addis Abebe (ETH); Africa | 28:06.43 | Antonio Prieto (ESP); Spain | 28:07.42 |
| 110 metre hurdles | Roger Kingdom (USA); United States | 12.87 | Colin Jackson (GBR); Great Britain | 12.95 | Emilio Valle (CUB); Americas | 13.21 |
| 400 metre hurdles | David Patrick (USA); United States | 48.74 | Henry Amike (NGR); Africa | 49.24 | Kriss Akabusi (GBR); Great Britain | 49.42 |
| 3000 metre steeplechase | Julius Kariuki (KEN); Africa | 8:20.84 | Alessandro Lambruschini (ITA); Europe | 8:21.75 | Hagen Melzer (GDR); East Germany | 8:23.21 |
| 4×100 metre relay | United States; Andre Cason; Tony Dees; Daron Council; Slip Watkins | 38.29 | Great Britain; Clarence Callender; John Regis; Marcus Adam; Linford Christie | 38.34 | Europe; Max Morinière; Gilles Quénéhervé; Bruno Marie-Rose; Daniel Sangouma | 38.47 |
| 4×400 metre relay | Americas; Lázaro Martínez; Sérgio Menezes; Howard Burnett; Roberto Hernández | 3:00.65 | United States; Clarence Daniel; Oliver Bridges; Raymond Pierre; Antonio Pettigrew | 3:00.99 | Africa; Simeon Kipkemboi; Lucas Sang; David Kitur; Gabriel Tiacoh | 3:01.88 |
| High jump | Patrik Sjöberg (SWE); Europe | 2.34 | Dalton Grant (GBR); Great Britain | 2.31 | Javier Sotomayor (CUB); Americas | 2.25 |
| Pole vault | Philippe Collet (FRA); Europe | 5.75 | Tim Bright (USA); United States | 5.70 | Uwe Langhammer (GDR); East Germany | 5.55 |
| Long jump | Larry Myricks (USA); United States | 8.29 | Yusuf Alli (NGR); Africa | 8.00 | Stewart Faulkner (GBR); Great Britain | 7.84 |
| Triple jump | Mike Conley (USA); United States | 17.49 | Volodymyr Inozemtsev (URS); Soviet Union | 17.31 | Jonathan Edwards (GBR); Great Britain | 17.28 |
| Shot put | Ulf Timmermann (GDR); East Germany | 21.68 | Werner Günthör (SUI); Europe | 21.40 | Randy Barnes (USA); United States | 21.10 |
| Discus throw | Jürgen Schult (GDR); East Germany | 67.12 | Luis Delís (CUB); Americas | 66.72 | Rolf Danneberg (FRG); Europe | 65.30 |
| Hammer throw | Heinz Weis (FRG); Europe | 77.68 | Lance Deal (USA); United States | 76.38 | Ralf Haber (GDR); East Germany | 76.28 |
| Javelin throw | Steve Backley (GBR); Great Britain | 85.90 | Kazuhiro Mizoguchi (JPN); Asia | 82.56 | Volker Hadwich (GDR); East Germany | 80.30 |

=== Women ===
| Event | Gold | | Silver | | Bronze | |
|---|---|---|---|---|---|---|
| 100 metres | Sheila Echols (USA); United States | 11.18 | Mary Onyali (NGR); Africa | 11.23 | Silke Möller (GDR); East Germany | 11.24 |
| 200 metres | Silke Möller (GDR); East Germany | 22.46 | Mary Onyali (NGR); Africa | 22.82 | Grace Jackson (JAM); Americas | 22.87 |
| 400 metres | Ana Fidelia Quirot (CUB); Americas | 50.60 | Grit Breuer (GDR); East Germany | 50.67 | Falilat Ogunkoya (NGR); Africa | 51.67 |
| 800 metres | Ana Fidelia Quirot (CUB); Americas | 1:54.44 | Sigrun Wodars (GDR); East Germany | 1:55.70 | Doina Melinte (ROU); Europe | 1:56.55 |
| 1500 metres | Paula Ivan (ROU); Europe | 4:18.60 | Yekaterina Podkopayeva (URS); Soviet Union | 4:19.44 | Yvonne Mai (GDR); East Germany | 4:20.30 |
| 3000 metres | Yvonne Murray (GBR); Europe | 8:44.32 | Tatyana Pozdnyakova (URS); Soviet Union | 8:49.42 | PattiSue Plumer (USA); United States | 8:54.33 |
| 10,000 metres | Kathrin Ullrich (GDR); East Germany | 31:33.92 | Ingrid Kristiansen (NOR); Europe | 31:42.01 | Natalya Sorokivskaya (URS); Soviet Union | 32:15.53 |
| 100 metre hurdles | Cornelia Oschkenat (GDR); East Germany | 12.60 | Lyudmila Narozhilenko (URS); Soviet Union | 12.80 | Lynda Tolbert (USA); United States | 12.86 |
| 400 metre hurdles | Sandra Farmer-Patrick (USA); United States | 53.84 | Tatyana Ledovskaya (URS); Soviet Union | 54.86 | Sally Gunnell (GBR); Europe | 55.25 |
| 4×100 metre relay | East Germany; Kerstin Behrendt; Sabine Günther; Silke Möller; Cornelia Oschkenat | 42.21 | Soviet Union; Natalya Kovtun; Galina Malchugina; Tatyana Papilina; Natalya Voronova | 42.76 | United States; Sheila Echols; Esther Jones; Dawn Sowell; Wenda Vereen | 42.83 |
| 4×400 metre relay | Americas; Charmaine Crooks; Pauline Davis; Grace Jackson; Ana Fidelia Quirot | 3:23.05 | East Germany; Annett Hesselbarth; Katrin Schreiter; Christine Wachtel; Grit Breuer | 3:23.97 | Soviet Union; Lyudmila Dzhigalova; Yelena Golesheva; Marina Shmonina; Yelena Ruzina | 3:26.15 |
| High jump | Silvia Costa (CUB); Americas | 2.04 | Tamara Bykova (URS); Soviet Union | 1.97 | Alina Astafei (ROU); Europe | 1.94 |
| Long jump | Galina Chistyakova (URS); Soviet Union | 7.10 | Marieta Ilcu (ROU); Europe | 6.71 | Nicole Boegman (AUS); Oceania | 6.64 |
| Shot put | Huang Zhihong (CHN); Asia | 20.73 | Heike Hartwig (GDR); East Germany | 20.62 | Claudia Losch (FRG); Europe | 20.10 |
| Discus throw | Ilke Wyludda (GDR); East Germany | 71.54 | Hou Xuemei (CHN); Asia | 66.04 | Maritza Martén (CUB); Americas | 65.40 |
| Javelin throw | Petra Felke (GDR); East Germany | 70.32 | Zhang Li (CHN); Asia | 61.50 | Laverne Eve (BAH); Americas | 60.32 |
