= Sandra Myers =

American sprinter (b1961)

Sandra Myers (born January 9, 1961, in Little River, Kansas) is a retired 400 metres sprinter who represented Spain after switching from the United States. She became US champion at 400 metres hurdles in 1981, but received Spanish nationality in 1987 and competed for Spain since. In 1991 she won a silver medal at the World Indoor Championships and a bronze medal at the World Championships.

Myers attended college at California State University, Northridge

== Achievements ==
Year	Competition	Venue	Position	Event	Notes
Representing United States
1981	World Cup	Rome, Italy	7th	400 m hurdles	59.95
Representing Spain
1988	European Indoor Championships	Budapest, Hungary	9th (sf)	60 m	7.32
1988	European Indoor Championships	Budapest, Hungary	12th	Long jump	6.12 m
1988	Ibero-American Championships	Mexico City, Mexico	1st	100m	11.47 (+0.0 m/s) A
1988	Ibero-American Championships	Mexico City, Mexico	3rd	Long jump	6.38 m A
1988	Ibero-American Championships	Mexico City, Mexico	1st	4 × 100 m relay	44.47 A
1988	Olympic Games	Seoul, South Korea	43rd (h)	100 m	11.86
1989	World Cup	Barcelona, Spain	6th	100 m	11.36
1989	World Cup	Barcelona, Spain	5th	4 × 100 m relay	44.62
1990	European Indoor Championships	Glasgow, United Kingdom	4th	200 m	23.08
1990	European Championships	Split, Yugoslavia	4th	200 m	22.38
1990	Ibero-American Championships	Manaus, Brazil	1st	100m	11.50 (+0.6 m/s)
1990	Ibero-American Championships	Manaus, Brazil	2nd	4 × 100 m relay	45.60
1990	Ibero-American Championships	Manaus, Brazil	2nd	4 × 400 m relay	3:35.2
1991	World Indoor Championships	Seville, Spain	2nd	400 m	50.99
1991	World Indoor Championships	Seville, Spain	4th	4 × 400 m relay	3:31.86
1991	World Championships	Tokyo, Japan	3rd	400 m	49.78
1991	World Championships	Tokyo, Japan	11th (h)	4 × 100 m relay	44.08
1991	World Championships	Tokyo, Japan	7th	4 × 400 m relay	3:27.57
1992	European Indoor Championships	Genoa, Italy	1st	400 m	51.21
1993	World Indoor Championships	Toronto, Canada	4th	400 m	51.45
1993	World Championships	Stuttgart, Germany	6th	400 m	51.22
1994	European Championships	Helsinki, Finland	6th (h)	400 m	51.93^{1}
1995	World Indoor Championships	Barcelona, Spain	12th (sf)	400 m	51.45
1995	World Championships	Gothenburg, Sweden	10th (sf)	400 m	51.03
1995	World Championships	Gothenburg, Sweden	13th (h)	4 × 400 m relay	3:31.71
1996	European Indoor Championships	Stockholm, Sweden	1st	200 m	23.15
1996	Olympic Games	Atlanta, United States	20th (qf)	200 m	23.20
1996	Olympic Games	Atlanta, United States	14th (sf)	400 m	51.42

^{1}Did not finish in the semifinals

=== Personal bests ===
- 100 metres: 11.06 s (1991)
- 200 metres: 22.38 s (1990)
- 400 metres: 49.67 s (1991)
- Long jump: 6.60 m (1988)
