= Yuliana Marinova =

Bulgarian sprinter

Yuliana Marinova (Bulgarian: Юлиянa Маринова) (born 24 July 1967) is a retired Bulgarian sprinter who specialized in the 400 metres.

She finished eighth in the 4 x 400 metres relay at the 1987 World Championships, with teammates Tsvetanka Ilieva, Rositsa Stamenova and Pepa Pavlova.

Her personal best time was 50.82 seconds, achieved in August 1987 in Sofia.
