= Helga Arendt =

German sprinter (1964–2013)

Personal information
- Born: 24 April 1964 Cologne, West Germany
- Died: 11 March 2013 (aged 48) Pulheim, Germany

Sport
- Sport: Track and field
Medal record
Representing West Germany
World Indoor Championships
Gold medal – first place	1989 Budapest	400 m
European Indoor Championships
Silver medal – second place	1988 Budapest	400 m
Summer Universiade
Silver medal – second place	1989 Duisburg	4x400 m relay

Helga Arendt (24 April 1964 – 11 March 2013) was a West German sprinter who competed mainly in the 400 metres.

== Biography ==
Arendt was born in Cologne, North Rhine-Westphalia. In 1987 she finished fourth at the 1987 European Indoor Championships, only 0.01 second behind bronze medalist Cristina Pérez. Later that year she competed at the 1987 World Championships. In the 4 × 400 metres relay she finished fifth with teammates Ute Thimm, Gudrun Abt and Gisela Kinzel. She also competed in the individual 400 metres distance, but did not reach the final round of competition.

On 20 February the next year Arendt helped set a world indoor record of 1:32.55 minutes in the 4 × 200 metres relay, with Silke Knoll, Mechthild Kluth and Gisela Kinzel of the sports club SC Eintracht Hamm. At the 1988 European Indoor Championships she won a silver medal in the 400 metres, placing between East Germans Petra Müller and Dagmar Neubauer. At the 1988 Olympic Games she finished seventh in the 400 metres and fourth in the 4 × 400 m relay, with Ute Thimm, Andrea Thomas and Gudrun Abt.

In 1989 came the highlight of Arendt's career as she won the gold medal at the World Indoor Championships. She finished ahead of American Diane Dixon, who had finished fifth at the Olympics, with a margin of 0.25 seconds. At the 1990 European Championships, however, Arendt was again knocked out before the final round of the 400 metres competition, only reaching the semi-final. She finished fourth in the 4 × 400 metres relay with teammates Karin Janke, Andrea Thomas and Silke Knoll.

Arendt represented the sports clubs Pulheimer SC, ASV Köln, SC Eintracht Hamm and LG Olympia Dortmund during her active career. She became West German champion in 1988 and 1989, as well as West German indoor champion in 1987, 1988 and 1989. Her personal best times were 23.13 in the 200 metres, achieved in July 1988 in Frankfurt am Main, and 50.36 in the 400 metres, achieved in the 1988 Olympic semi-final in Seoul.

Arendt was 1.78 metres tall; during her active career she weighed 66 kilograms.
