= Athletics at the 1999 Pan American Games – Women's 4 × 100 metres relay =

Women's 4 × 100 metres relay at the Pan American Games

The women's 4 × 100 metres relay event at the 1999 Pan American Games was held on July 30.

== Results ==
Rank	Nation	Athletes	Time	Notes
1st place, gold medalist(s)	Jamaica	Kerry-Ann Richards, Aleen Bailey, Beverly Grant, Peta-Gaye Dowdie	42.62	GR
2nd place, silver medalist(s)	United States	Shelia Burrell, Passion Richardson, Angela Williams, Torri Edwards	43.27	
3rd place, bronze medalist(s)	Cuba	Misleidys Lazo, Idalia Hechavarría, Mercedes Carnesolta, Virgen Benavides	43.52	
4	Canada	Philomena Mensah, Angela Bailey, Tara Perry, Venolyn Clarke	43.73	
5	Colombia	Mirtha Brock, Norfalia Carabalí, Felipa Palacios, Patricia Rodríguez	43.86	
6	Ecuador	Ana Mariuxi Caicedo, Zulay Nazareno, Maritza Valencia, Ondina Rodríguez	46.86	
