= Cathy Rattray-Williams =

Jamaican sprinter

Cathy Rattray-Williams OLY
Personal information
- Born: 19 August 1963 (age 62)

Sport
- Sport: Track and field
Medal record
Representing Jamaica
World Indoor Championships
Gold medal – first place	1993 Toronto	4x400m relay
Commonwealth Games
Bronze medal – third place	1982 Brisbane	4x100m relay
Pan American Games
Bronze medal – third place	1987 Indianapolis	4x400m relay
Bronze medal – third place	1991 Havana	4x400m relay
Central American and Caribbean Games
Silver medal – second place	1982 Havana	4x100m relay
Bronze medal – third place	1982 Havana	400m
Bronze medal – third place	1982 Havana	4x400m relay
Bronze medal – third place	1986 Santiago	400m

Cathy Ann Rattray-Williams (born 19 August 1963) is a retired female sprinter from Jamaica, who mainly competed in the women's 400 metres during her career. She is a four-time Olympian, making her debut in 1980 (Moscow, Soviet Union). She won 17 All-American honors while competing in college for the University of Tennessee.

== International competitions ==
Year	Competition	Venue	Position	Event	Notes
Representing Jamaica
1980	Olympic Games	Moscow, Soviet Union	9th (h)	4 × 400 m relay	3:31.5
1980	Central American and Caribbean; Junior Championships (U20)	Nassau, Bahamas	1st	400 m	54.6
1980	Pan American Junior Championships	Sudbury, Canada	3rd	400 m	54.01
1981	Central American and Caribbean Championships	Santo Domingo, Dominican Republic	2nd	4 × 400 m relay	3:40.00
1982	Central American and Caribbean; Junior Championships (U20)	Bridgetown, Barbados	1st	400 m	54.53
1982	Central American and Caribbean; Junior Championships (U20)	Bridgetown, Barbados	3rd	4 × 100 m relay	47.56
1982	Central American and Caribbean; Junior Championships (U20)	Bridgetown, Barbados	2nd	4 × 400 m relay	3:51.24
1982	Central American and Caribbean Games	Havana, Cuba	3rd	400 m	52.39
1982	Central American and Caribbean Games	Havana, Cuba	4th	800 m	2:06.68
1982	Central American and Caribbean Games	Havana, Cuba	2nd	4 × 100 m relay	45.77
1982	Central American and Caribbean Games	Havana, Cuba	3rd	4 × 400 m relay	3:37.86
1982	Commonwealth Games	Brisbane, Australia	11th (sf)	400 m	53.60
1982	Commonwealth Games	Brisbane, Australia	10th (h)	800 m	2:10.22
1982	Commonwealth Games	Brisbane, Australia	3rd	4 × 100 m relay	43.69
1983	Pan American Games	Caracas, Venezuela	4th	400 m	52.91
1983	World Championships	Helsinki, Finland	20th (qf)	400 m	53.78
1983	World Championships	Helsinki, Finland	9th (h)	4 × 400 m relay	3:34.17
1984	Olympic Games	Los Angeles, United States	14th (sf)	400 m	53.23
1984	Olympic Games	Los Angeles, United States	5th	4 × 400 m relay	3:27.51
1986	Central American and Caribbean Games	Santiago, Dominican Republic	3rd	400 m	52.67
1986	Central American and Caribbean Games	Santiago, Dominican Republic	4th	800 m	2:03.96
1987	Central American and Caribbean Championships	Caracas, Venezuela	2nd	400 m	51.83
1987	Central American and Caribbean Championships	Caracas, Venezuela	2nd	800 m	2:05.85
1987	Pan American Games	Indianapolis, United States	9th (h)	400 m	52.62
1987	Pan American Games	Indianapolis, United States	3rd	4 × 400 m relay	3:29.50
1987	World Championships	Rome, Italy	16th (sf)	400 m	52.51
1987	World Championships	Rome, Italy	6th	4 × 400 m relay	3:27.51
1988	Olympic Games	Seoul, South Korea	13th (sf)	400 m	50.82
1988	Olympic Games	Seoul, South Korea	5th	4 × 400 m relay	3:23.13
1990	Goodwill Games	Seattle, United States	4th	4 × 400 m relay	3:33.11
1991	Central American and Caribbean Championships	Xalapa, Mexico	1st	400 m	53.37
1991	Central American and Caribbean Championships	Xalapa, Mexico	2nd	800 m	2:07.43
1991	Central American and Caribbean Championships	Xalapa, Mexico	1st	4 × 400 m relay	3:38.18
1991	Pan American Games	Havana, Cuba	8th	800 m	2:08.21
1991	Pan American Games	Havana, Cuba	3rd	4 × 400 m relay	3:28.33
1992	Olympic Games	Barcelona, Spain	5th	4 × 400 m relay	3:25.68
1993	World Indoor Championships	Toronto, Canada	1st	4 × 400 m relay	3:32.32
