= Francisca Chepkurui =

Kenyan runner

Personal information
- Born: September 11, 1963 (age 62)

Sport
- Sport: Athletics
- Event(s): 400 metres, 800 metres

Achievements and titles
- Personal best(s): 400 m: 51.99 (1987); 800 m: 1:58.1 (1988)
Medal record
Representing Kenya
African Games
| Gold medal – first place | 1987 Nairobi | 400 m |
| Silver medal – second place | 1987 Nairobi | 4 × 400 m |

Francisca Chepkurui, HSC (born 11 September 1963) is a retired Kenyan middle-distance runner. She won the gold medal in the 400 metres at the 1987 All-Africa Games in Nairobi. Later in those games she anchored Kenya to a silver medal in set the 4 × 400 metres relay, setting a still-standing Kenyan record of 3:28.94.

Later in the 1987 season, Chepkurui competed in the second-ever World Championships in Athletics in both the 400 m and the 4 × 400 m. She did not advance to the finals in either event.

In 1988, Chepkurui moved up to the 800 metres, culminating in August with a 1:58.1 hand-timed personal best which at the time was a Kenyan record and African record. Her national record stood until 2007. She was viewed as a gold medal favorite for the 1988 Summer Olympics, but she was withdrawn from competition before the Games started. The IAAF does not list any results for Chepkurui past 1988.
