= Aelita Yurchenko =

Ukrainian sprinter

Personal information
- Born: 1 January 1965 (age 61) Mogilev, Byelorussian SSR, Soviet Union
- Height: 1.65 m (5 ft 5 in)
- Weight: 64 kg (141 lb)

Sport
- Sport: Track and field
- Event: 400 metres
Medal record
Women's athletics
World Championships
Representing the Soviet Union
| Silver medal – second place | 1987 Rome | 4 × 400 metres relay |
World Indoor Championships
Representing the Soviet Union
| Silver medal – second place | 1991 Seville | 4 × 400 metres relay |
European Cup
Representing Ukraine
| Silver medal – second place | 1993 Rome | 4 × 400 metres relay |

Aelita Vyacheslavovna Yurchenko (Ukrainian: Аеліта В'ячеславівна Юрченко; born 1 January 1965) is a retired Ukrainian sprinter who specialised in the 400 metres. She represented the Soviet Union and later Ukraine at three outdoor and two indoor World Championships.

== Competition record ==
| Year | Competition | Venue | Position | Event | Notes |
Representing the Soviet Union
| 1987 | World Championships | Rome, Italy | 2nd | 4 × 400 m relay | 3:19.50 |
| 1991 | World Indoor Championships | Seville, Spain | 4th | 400 m | 51.59 |
| 1991 | World Indoor Championships | Seville, Spain | 2nd | 4 × 400 m relay | 3:27.95 |
| 1991 | World Championships | Tokyo, Japan | 11th (h) | 400 m | 52.65 |
Representing Ukraine
| 1993 | World Championships | Stuttgart, Germany | 10th (sf) | 400 m | 51.55 |
| 1993 | World Championships | Stuttgart, Germany | 9th (h) | 4 × 400 m relay | 3:30.37 |
| 1997 | World Indoor Championships | Paris, France | 5th | 4 × 400 m relay | 3:30.43 |

== Personal bests ==
Outdoor

- 200 metres – 22.67 (Simferopol 1988)
- 400 metres – 49.47 (Moscow 1988)

Indoor

- 400 metres – 51.59 (Seville 1991)
