= Athletics at the 1991 Summer Universiade – Women's 400 metres =

The women's 400 metres event at the 1991 Summer Universiade was held at the Don Valley Stadium in Sheffield on 21 and 22 July 1991.

== Medalists ==
Gold	Silver	Bronze
Maicel Malone; United States	Gretha Tromp; Netherlands	Galina Moskvina; Soviet Union

== Results ==
=== Heats ===
Rank	Heat	Athlete	Nationality	Time	Notes
1	3	Maicel Malone	United States	51.50	Q
2	1	Yelena Golesheva	Soviet Union	52.30	Q
3	2	Galina Moskvina	Soviet Union	53.17	Q
4	3	Gretha Tromp	Netherlands	53.20	Q
5	1	Renee Poetschka	Australia	53.55	Q
6	1	Sylwia Pachut	Poland	53.66	q
7	2	Tasha Downing	United States	53.85	Q
8	1	Orit Kolodni	Israel	54.70	q
9	1	Camelia Jianu	Romania	54.71	
10	3	Barbara Grzywocz	Poland	54.82	
11	3	Francesca Carbone	Italy	54.99	
12	2	Maria Vicenza Marasco	Italy	55.75	
12	3	Emma Nicholson	Ireland	55.75	
14	2	Ester Sumah	Indonesia	56.92	
15	2	Lin Shu-huei	Chinese Taipei	57.29	
16	1	Jacqueline Solíz	Bolivia	59.10	
17	2	Mirta Jackson	Costa Rica	1:01.61	
18	3	Mariyam Shifa	Maldives	1:10.67	

=== Final ===
Rank	Athlete	Nationality	Time	Notes
1st place, gold medalist(s)	Maicel Malone	United States	50.65	
2nd place, silver medalist(s)	Gretha Tromp	Netherlands	52.06	
3rd place, bronze medalist(s)	Galina Moskvina	Soviet Union	52.34	
4	Renee Poetschka	Australia	52.66	
5	Yelena Golesheva	Soviet Union	52.74	
6	Tasha Downing	United States	52.99	
7	Sylwia Pachut	Poland	53.59	
8	Orit Kolodni	Israel	53.66	
