= Sandra Seuser =

German sprinter (born 1966)

Sandra Maria Seuser (born 17 April 1966 in Berlin) is a retired German sprinter who specialized in the 400 metres.

At the 1991 IAAF World Indoor Championships in Seville Seuser helped win the gold medal in an indoor world record time of 3:27.22 minutes. Her teammates were Katrin Schreiter, Annett Hesselbarth and Grit Breuer. At the 1993 World Championships in Athletics Seuser finished fifth in the same event.
