= Natasha Kaiser-Brown =

American sprinter (born 1967)

Personal information
- Born: May 14, 1967 (age 59) Des Moines, Iowa, U.S.
- Education: University of Missouri
Medal record
Women's athletics
Representing United States
Olympic Games
Silver medal – second place	1992 Barcelona	4×400 m relay
World Championships
Gold medal – first place	1993 Stuttgart	4×400 m relay
Silver medal – second place	1993 Stuttgart	400 m
World Indoor Championships
Silver medal – second place	1993 Toronto	4×400 m relay
Silver medal – second place	1997 Paris	4×400 m relay
Summer Universiade
Gold medal – first place	1989 Duisburg	4x400 m relay

Natasha Kaiser-Brown, née Natasha Kaiser, (born May 14, 1967) is an American sprinter who specialized in the 400 meter run. As of 2022, she is the head coach of track and field at the University of Missouri in Columbia, Missouri.

Kaiser-Brown was born in Des Moines, Iowa. In high school, she was a nine-time state champion for Des Moines Roosevelt and is the previous record-holder for the 100 meter and sprint medley relay events (both broken in the 2018 track season).

As a member of the Missouri Tigers track and field team from 1985 to 1989, she won five individual conference titles, earned NCAA All-American honors in the 400 m dash six times, and named Big 8 Female Athlete of the Year in 1989. In 1989, she also was the 400 m dash Indoor National Champion with a collegiate record time of 51.92 seconds, which still stands as the school record.

At the 1991 Pan American Games she finished fourth in the 400 meter run and won a gold medal in 4 × 400 meter relay. She won a silver medal in the relay at the 1992 Summer Olympics with her teammates Gwen Torrence, Jearl Miles and Rochelle Stevens. In 1993 she won a relay silver medal at the 1993 World Indoor Championships as well as two medals at the 1993 World Championships. She won the 400 meter event at the 1994 Nationals and was a member of the 1996 USA Olympic team in Atlanta.

Her personal best time is 50.17 seconds, achieved in 1993.

She is married to Brian Brown and coached alongside him at Drake University. The pair have a daughter, Elle Brown, who is a basketball player at the University of Missouri.
