= Viviane Dorsile =

French athlete (born 1967)

Medal record

Women's athletics

Representing France

European Championships
| Gold medal – first place | 1994 Helsinki | 4×400 m |

Viviane Dorsile (born 1 June 1967 in Sainte Anne, Guadeloupe) is a French athlete who specialises in the 800 meters and the 4 × 400 meter relay. She competed at the 1992 Summer Olympics and 1996 Summer Olympics. She was part of the French relay team that won the gold in the 1994 European Athletics Championships held at Helsinki.

== Biography ==
Viviane Dorsile was born in Sainte Anne, Guadeloupe on 1 June 1967. She set a personal best time of 1:59.29 in the women's 800 metres in France on 27 June 1992 and qualified for the Olympics. She made her Olympic debut for France at the women's 800 metres event in the 1992 Summer Olympics. She finished fourth in the fifth preliminary heats with a time of 2:01.54 and did not advance further. In the 1994 European Athletics Championships held at Helsinki, she was part of the French relay team that won the gold medal with a personal best time of 3:22.34. She won a bronze medal in the 400 metres event in the European Indoor Championships in 1994.

She took part in her second consecutive Olympic Games in the 1996 Summer Olympics. She took part in two events in what was her final Olympic appearance. In the women's 800 metres event, she finished fourth in the preliminary heat with her personal best Olympic time of 2:00.02 to qualify for the semifinals. In the semifinals, she came seventh with a time of 2:00.68 and did not make it to the finals. She was part of the French team, that took part in the women's 4 x 400 metres relay event. The French team made it to the finals after taking the final qualifying place from the heats with a time of 3:28.07. However, the team finished eighth and last in the finals. Her last major medal was a bronze won in the 800 metres event at the European Cup in 1999.
