= Iolanda Oanță =

Romanian athlete (born 1965)

Personal information
- Nationality: Romanian
- Born: 11 October 1965 (age 60)

Sport
- Sport: Athletics
- Event(s): 200 metres, 400 metres Triple jump

Iolanda Oanță (born 11 October 1965) is a Romanian track and field athlete who competed mainly in the 200 metres and 400 metres. She is a two-time silver medallist at the European Indoor Championships, and reached the quarterfinals of the 200 metres at the 1992 Barcelona Olympics.

== International competitions ==
Year	Competition	Venue	Position	Event	Notes
1989	World Indoor Championships	Budapest, Hungary	9th (sf)	400 m	52.93
1990	European Indoor Championships	Glasgow, United Kingdom	2nd	400 m	52.22
1991	World Indoor Championships	Seville, Spain	9th (sf)	400 m	53.40
1992	European Indoor Championships	Genoa, Italy	2nd	200 m	23.23
1992	European Indoor Championships	Genoa, Italy	DNS (final)	400 m	52.96 (heat)
1992	Olympic Games	Barcelona, Spain	27th (qf)	200 m	23.75
1993	World Indoor Championships	Toronto, Canada	13th (q)	Triple jump	13.32 m
(#) Indicates overall position in semifinals (sf) quarterfinals (qf) or qualifying round (q). DNS = did not start
