= Lorraine Hanson (sprinter) =

British athlete

Personal information
- Nationality: British (English)
- Born: 22 April 1965 (age 60) Manchester, England

Sport
- Sport: Athletics
- Event: Sprinting/400 m
- Club: Birchfield Harriers

Lorraine Hanson (born 22 April 1965) is a British female former sprinter who competed mainly in the 400 metres and hurdles.

== Biography ==
Hanson finished third behind Sally Fleming in the 400 metres hurdle event at the 1987 WAAA Championships and second behind Wendy Cearns at the 1989 AAA Championships.

Hanson ran her lifetime best of 50.93 secs at the 1991 World Championships in Tokyo, which at the time moved her to fourth on the British all-time list, and as of 2018 ranks her 13th. At the same championship, she was a member of the British 4 x 400 metres relay quartet (along with Phylis Smith, Sally Gunnell and Linda Keough) that finished fourth in the British record time of 3:22.01; a time that would stand as the British record for 16 years.

She also competed in the women's 400 metres at the 1992 Barcelona Olympics.

She represented England in the 400 metres hurdles event, at the 1990 Commonwealth Games in Auckland, New Zealand.

Hanson later won the 400 metres AAA title at the 1997 AAA Championships.

== International competitions ==
Year	Competition	Venue	Position	Event	Notes
Representing England
1990	Commonwealth Games	Auckland, New Zealand	6th	400 m hurdles	57.58 (57.14 heat)
Representing Great Britain
1990	European Championships	Split, Yugoslavia	19th (h)	400 m	53.57
1991	World Championships	Tokyo, Japan	11th (sf)	400m	50.93
1991	World Championships	Tokyo, Japan	4th	4 x 400 m relay	3:22.01
1992	Olympic Games	Barcelona, Spain	26th (qf)	400 m	53.60 (52.66 heat)
(#) Indicates overall position in qualifying heats (h) quarterfinals (qf) or semifinals (sf)
