= Evelyne Elien =

French sprinter (born 1964)

Medal record

Women's athletics

Representing France

European Championships
| Gold medal – first place | 1994 Helsinki | 4×400 m |

Evelyne Elien (born 24 March 1964 in Basse-Terre, Guadeloupe) is a French former athlete who specialised in the 400 meters. Elien competed at the 1988 Summer Olympics and 1996 Summer Olympics.

== Bibliography ==
- Evans, Hilary; Gjerde, Arild; Heijmans, Jeroen; Mallon, Bill; et al. "Evelyne Elien". Olympics at Sports-Reference.com. Sports Reference LLC. Archived from the original on 2020-04-17.
