= Kathrin Lüthi =

Swiss sprinter

Personal information
- Nationality: Swiss
- Born: 7 October 1969 (age 57)

Sport
- Sport: Sprinting
- Event: 4 × 400 metres relay

Kathrin Lüthi (born 7 October 1969) is a Swiss sprinter. She competed in the women's 4 × 400 metres relay at the 1992 Summer Olympics.
