= Karin Janke =

German sprinter

Personal information
- Born: 14 October 1963 (age 62) Wolfsburg, West Germany

Sport
- Sport: Track and field
Medal record
Representing West Germany
Summer Universiade
Silver medal – second place	1989 Duisburg	4x400 m relay
Bronze medal – third place	1989 Duisburg	4x100 m relay
Representing Germany
European Championships
Bronze medal – third place	1994 Helsinki	4×400 m relay

Karin Johanna Maria Janke (born 14 October 1963) is a retired German sprinter who specialized in the 400 metres. She represented the sports club VfL Wolfsburg.

== Achievements ==
Year	Competition	Venue	Position	Event	Notes
Representing West Germany
1989	Universiade	Duisburg, West Germany	4th	400 m	
1989	Universiade	Duisburg, West Germany	1st	4 x 100 m relay	
1990	European Championships	Split, Yugoslavia	8th (sf)	400 m	51.65
1990	European Championships	Split, Yugoslavia	4th	4 × 400 m relay	3:25.12
Representing Germany
1994	European Championships	Helsinki, Finland	3rd	4 × 400 m relay	3:24.10
1995	World Championships	Gothenburg, Sweden	4th	4 × 400 m relay	3:26.10
