= Marina Shmonina =

Uzbek sprinter (born 1965)

Marina Shmonina (born 9 February 1965) is an athlete who represented the Soviet Union, and later Russia. She specialized in the 400 metres and 4 × 400 metres relay.

Born in Tashkent, Uzbek SSR, Shmonina competed for the Unified Team at the 1992 Summer Olympics, in the heats of the relay competition. When the team of Yelena Ruzina, Lyudmila Dzhigalova, Olga Nazarova and Olga Bryzgina won the final, Shmonina was also awarded the gold medal. Shmonina was hailed in Uzbekistan as the first Uzbek athlete to win an Olympic gold medal.

== Doping ==
At the 1993 IAAF World Indoor Championships Shmonina tested positive for the anabolic steroid stanozolol and the Russian 4 × 400 relay team lost the gold medal. Shmonina was also handed a four-year ban from sports for the anti-doping rule violation.

== Achievements ==
Year	Competition	Venue	Position	Event	Notes
Representing Soviet Union
1989	European Indoor Championships	The Hague, Netherlands	2nd	400 m	52.36
1989	World Indoor Championships	Budapest, Hungary	5th	400 m	52.44
1990	European Indoor Championships	Glasgow, Scotland	1st	400 m	51.22
1990	Goodwill Games	Seattle, United States	7th	400 m	
1990	Goodwill Games	Seattle, United States	1st	4 × 400 m relay	3:23.70
1990	European Championships	Split, Yugoslavia	7th	400 m	51.67
1990	European Championships	Split, Yugoslavia	1st	4 × 400 m relay	
1991	World Indoor Championships	Seville, Spain	2nd	4 × 400 m relay	3:27.95
Representing Unified Team
1992	European Indoor Championships	Genoa, Italy	5th	400 m	52.26
1992	Olympic Games	Barcelona, Spain	1st	4 × 400 m relay	
Representing Russia Russia
1993	World Indoor Championships	Toronto, Canada	DSQ (1st)	4 × 400 m relay	DSQ (3:28.90)

- At both the 1990 Europeans and 1992 Olympics Shmonina ran in the heats but not the final.
- At the 1993 World Indoors, the Russians were the original winners in 3:28.90. They were disqualified due to Shmonina failing a drugs test.
