= Annett Hesselbarth =

German sprinter (born 1966)

Medal record

Women's athletics

Representing East Germany

European Championships
Gold medal – first place	1990 Split	4×400 m

Annett Hesselbarth (born 4 June 1966 in Halle) is a retired German sprinter who specialized in the 400 metres.

At the 1990 European Championships in Athletics in Split, she finished fourth in 400 m and won the 4 × 400 m relay for East Germany together with Grit Breuer, Manuela Derr and Petra Schersing. At the 1991 IAAF World Indoor Championships in Seville, Hesselbarth helped win the gold medal in an indoor world record time of 3:27.22 minutes. The teammates were Sandra Seuser, Katrin Schreiter and Grit Breuer. At the 1991 World Championships in Athletics she ran in the heats for the German team who finished third in the final.

== Achievements ==
Year	Competition	Venue	Position	Event	Notes
Representing East Germany / Germany
1989	World Cup	Barcelona, Spain	1st	4 × 400 m	3:23.97
1990	European Championships	Split, Yugoslavia	4th	400 m	51.14
1990	European Championships	Split, Yugoslavia	1st	4 × 400 m	3:21.02
1991	World Indoor Championships	Seville, Spain	1st	4 × 400 m	3:27.22
1991	World Championships	Tokyo, Japan	3rd	4 × 400 m	3:25.93 (3:21.25 in final)

Note: At the 1991 World Championships, Hesselbarth ran in the 4 × 400 m heats, but not the final.
