= Rochelle Stevens =

American athlete

Personal information
- Born: September 8, 1966 (age 59) Memphis, Tennessee, U.S.
- Education: Melrose High School (Memphis, Tennessee)
Medal record
Women's athletics
Representing the United States
Olympic Games
| Gold medal – first place | 1996 Atlanta | 4 × 400 m relay |
| Silver medal – second place | 1992 Barcelona | 4 × 400 m relay |
World Championships
| Gold medal – first place | 1995 Gothenburg | 4 × 400 m relay |
| Silver medal – second place | 1991 Tokyo | 4 × 400 m relay |
Goodwill Games
| Silver medal – second place | 1990 Seattle | 4 × 400 m relay |
| Bronze medal – third place | 1990 Seattle | 400 m |
Pan American Games
| Gold medal – first place | 1987 Indianapolis | 4 × 400 m relay |
Summer Universiade
| Gold medal – first place | 1987 Zagreb | 4 x 400 m relay |

Rochelle Stevens (born September 8, 1966) is a former 1996 Olympic gold medalist for the United States in the women's 4 × 400-meter relay. She was also part of the team that won the silver medal in the same event and 6th in the world at 400 meters at the 1992 Summer Olympics in Barcelona, Spain. Track and Field Head Coach at LeMoyne-Owen College since 2021.

== Biography ==
At college-level, she was an NCAA Division I 400 m champion and won NCAA All-American honours eleven times for the Morgan State Lady Bears track and field team. She won at the USA Outdoor Track and Field Championships on four occasions and was the 400 m champion at the 1992 US Olympic Trials. Over the course of her career she placed in the season's top-ten 400 m runners a total of six times.

Since 1999, Stevens helped thousands of clients lose weight and get healthy with her weight loss and cardio DVD at Rochelle's Health and Wellness Spa. The Memphis City Council renamed a street in front of Stevens alma mater Melrose High School (Memphis, Tennessee) to Olympian Rochelle Stevens Avenue.

In 2021, LeMoyne-Owen College hired Stevens as Track and Field Head Coach and Director of Operations.
