= Katrin Schreiter =

German sprinter

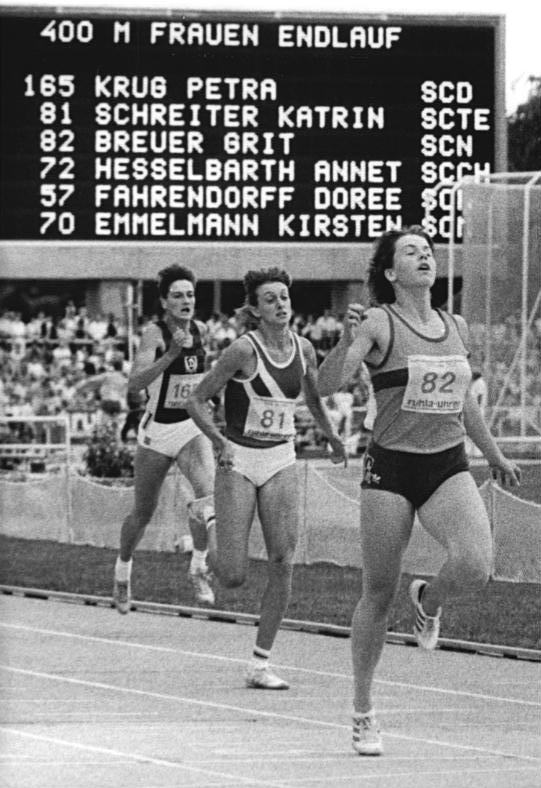
1989 GDR championships, L-R: Petra Krug, Katrin Schreiter, Grit Breuer

Katrin Schreiter (born 24 February 1969 in Arnstadt) is a retired German sprinter who specialized in the 400 metres.

At the 1991 IAAF World Indoor Championships in Seville Schreiter helped win the gold medal in an indoor world record time of 3:27.22 minutes. The teammates were Sandra Seuser, Annett Hesselbarth and Grit Breuer. At the 1991 World Championships in Athletics Schreiter ran in the heats for the German team who later finished third in the final.
