= Jillian Richardson =

Canadian sprinter (born 1965)

Personal information
- Born: March 10, 1965 (age 61) San Fernando, Trinidad and Tobago

Sport
- Sport: Track and field
Medal record
Representing Canada
Olympic Games
Silver medal – second place	1984 Los Angeles	4 x 400 metres
World Indoor Championships
Bronze medal – third place	1989 Budapest	400 metres
Commonwealth Games
Gold medal – first place	1982 Brisbane	4 x 400 metres
Gold medal – first place	1986 Edinburgh	4 x 400 metres
Silver medal – second place	1986 Edinburgh	400 metres
Pan American Games
Silver medal – second place	1987 Indianapolis	400 metres
Silver medal – second place	1987 Indianapolis	4 x 400 metres
Silver medal – second place	1983 Caracas	4 x 400 metres
Bronze medal – third place	1983 Caracas	4 x 100 metres
Summer Universiade
Silver medal – second place	1983 Edmonton	4 x 400 metres

Jillian Cheryl Richardson-Briscoe (born March 10, 1965) is a Canadian athlete who competed mainly in the 400 metres. She is a three-time Olympian. In 1988, she equalled Marita Payne's Canadian 400 metres record of 49.91 secs. The record (as of 2022) still stands. She was inducted into the Athletics Canada Hall of Fame in 2017.

Richardson won a gold medal at the 1982 Commonwealth Games as a member of the 4 x 400 meter relay team. She repeated that feat at the 1986 Commonwealth Games, as well as winning a silver in the 400 meters. She was a member of the 4 x 400 metre relay that took a silver medal in the 1983 Pan American Games. She won a silver in the 400 meters at the 1987 Pan American Games, and as part of the Canadian 4 x 400 meter relay team. She took a gold medal in the 400 metres and a silver medal in the 4 x 400 metre relay at the 1989 Francophone Games.

She competed for Canada at three Olympic Games. At the 1984 Summer Olympics in Los Angeles, she won the silver medal in the 4 x 400 metres relay with her teammates Charmaine Crooks, Molly Killingbeck and Marita Payne. At the 1988 Summer Olympics in Seoul, she was eliminated in the 400 metres semi-finals, running 49.91. It was the first time someone had broken 50 seconds and failed to reach the final. Canada failed to finish the 4 × 400 m relay final due to an injury to Molly Killingbeck. At the 1992 Summer Olympics in Barcelona, she finished fifth in the 400 m final, in 49.93 and fourth in the 4 × 400 m relay final.

== Achievements ==
- Three-time Canadian Champion - 400 m (1987) 200 m (1988, 1989)
- Canadian 400m record holder - 49.91 in 1988 (shared with Marita Payne)

Year	Competition	Venue	Position	Event	Notes
Representing Canada
1982	Commonwealth Games	Brisbane, Australia	1st	4 × 400 m	3:27.70
1983	World Championships	Helsinki, Finland	4th	4 × 400 m	3:27.41
1984	Olympic Games	Los Angeles, United States	2nd	4 × 400 m	3:21.21
1986	Commonwealth Games	Edinburgh, Scotland	2nd	400 m	51.62
1986	Commonwealth Games	Edinburgh, Scotland	1st	4 × 400 m	3:28.92
1987	Pan American Games	Indianapolis, United States	2nd	400 m	50.35
1987	Pan American Games	Indianapolis, United States	2nd	4 × 400 m	3:29.18
1987	World Championships	Rome, Italy	6th	400 m	51.03
1987	World Championships	Rome, Italy	4th	4 × 400 m	3:24.11
1988	Olympic Games	Seoul, South Korea	semi-final	400 m	49.91
1988	Olympic Games	Seoul, South Korea	DNF	4 × 400 m	
1989	World Indoor Championships	Budapest, Hungary	3rd	400 m	52.02
1989	Francophonie Games	Casablanca, Morocco	1st	400 m	51.79
1989	Francophonie Games	Casablanca, Morocco	2nd	4 × 400 m	3:32.96
1992	Olympic Games	Barcelona, Spain	5th	400 m	49.93
1992	Olympic Games	Barcelona, Spain	4th	4 × 400 m	3:25.20
1993	World Indoor Championships	Toronto, Canada	heats	400 m	

== See also ==
- Canadian records in track and field
