= Diane Dixon (sprinter) =

American athlete (born 1964)

Personal information
- Full name: Diane Lynn Dixon
- Born: September 23, 1964 (age 62) Brooklyn, New York, U.S.
- Height: 5 ft 5 in (1.65 m)
- Weight: 119 lb (54 kg)

Sport
- Country: United States
- Sport: Athletics (track and field)
- Events: 400 m, 4 × 400 m relay
- Club: Atoms Track Club
Medal record
Women's athletics
Representing United States
Olympic Games
Gold medal – first place	1984 Los Angeles	4 × 400 m relay
Silver medal – second place	1988 Seoul	4 × 400 m relay
World Championships
Silver medal – second place	1991 Tokyo	4 × 400 m relay
Bronze medal – third place	1987 Rome	4 × 400 m relay
World Indoor Championships
Gold medal – first place	1985 Paris	400 m
Gold medal – first place	1991 Seville	400 m
Silver medal – second place	1989 Budapest	400 m
Bronze medal – third place	1991 Seville	4 × 400 m relay
Pan American Games
Gold medal – first place	1987 Indianapolis	4 × 400 metres relay

Diane Lynn Dixon (born September 23, 1964) is an American athlete who competed mainly in the 400 metres. She was born in Brooklyn, New York. She has an Olympic gold medal for running with the American 4 × 400 meters relay team at the 1984 Olympics, running in the preliminary rounds.

She competed for the United States in the 1988 Summer Olympics held in Seoul, South Korea in the 4 × 400 metres where she won the silver medal with her teammates Denean Howard, Valerie Brisco-Hooks and Florence Griffith Joyner. Second place in that race is still the second fastest time ever run in that event behind the winning Soviet team and the current American record. She set her personal record of 49.84 while finishing third in an open semi-final in Seoul. Four years earlier she ran in the qualifying heat for the same relay that eventually took gold.

Dixon was also a part of two medal-winning teams in the 4 × 400 relay at the IAAF World Championships, taking a bronze in 1987 in Rome and a silver in 1991 in Tokyo.

Dixon was known for her aggressive frontrunning style indoors, where she could take the lead at the break (after the first 50 meters) and hold off her competitors who would then be forced to try to run around her. In 1981 she won her first of her USA Indoor Track and Field Championships at the (then) Imperial distance of 440 yards. In 1983 she won again and began an unprecedented streak of ten consecutive wins in the 440 or 400 metres. In 1985, Dixon won the 400 metres at the IAAF World Indoor Championships. She repeated the feat again in 1991, setting the American Record at 50.64 seconds in the event. That record stood until March 13, 2010, when it was broken by Francena McCorory from Hampton University at the NCAA Championships.

Dixon attended Brooklyn Technical High School and graduated in 1982.

Dixon owns the distinction of being the first Ohio State Buckeyes track and field women's student-athlete to capture an individual national track championship in the 400 meters at the 1983 indoor championships.

After retiring, Dixon worked to help other athletes with career guidance by founding Retired Elite Athletes Need Career Opportunities.
