= Yelena Ruzina =

Russian sprinter

Medal record

Women's athletics

Representing Unified Team

Olympic Games
| Gold medal – first place | 1992 Barcelona | 4×400 m |

Representing Russia

World Championships
| Silver medal – second place | 1993 Stuttgart | 4×400 m |

World Indoor Championships
| Gold medal – first place | 1995 Barcelona | 4×400 m |

Representing Soviet Union

European Championships
| Silver medal – second place | 1990 Split | 4×400 m |

Yelena Ivanovna Ruzina (Елена Ивановна Рузина) (born 3 April 1964 in Voronezh) is a retired athlete who competed mainly in the 400 metres. She represented the Soviet Union and later, Russia.

She competed for Commonwealth of Independent States at the 1992 Summer Olympics held in Barcelona, Spain in the 4 × 400 metres where she won the gold medal with her teammates Lyudmila Dzhigalova, Olga Nazarova, and 400 metres silver medalist Olga Bryzgina. She won another relay gold medal at the 1995 IAAF World Indoor Championships.
