= Lillie Leatherwood =

American athlete (born 1964)

Personal information
- Full name: Lillie Mae Leatherwood
- Born: July 6, 1964 (age 62) Tuscaloosa, Alabama, U.S.
Medal record
Women's athletics
Representing United States
Olympic Games
Gold medal – first place	1984 Los Angeles	4 × 400 m relay
Silver medal – second place	1988 Seoul	4 × 400 m relay
World Championships
Silver medal – second place	1991 Tokyo	4 × 400 m relay
Bronze medal – third place	1987 Rome	4 × 400 m relay

Lillie Mae Leatherwood (born July 6, 1964) is an American athlete who competed mainly in the 400 metres.

== Biography ==
Leatherwood was born in Tuscaloosa, Alabama and brought up in Ralph, Alabama. She attended the University of Alabama and joined the Zeta Phi Beta sorority via the Iota Eta chapter in 1986.

At the 1986 NCAA Indoor Track and Field Championships, she placed first over 400 m, setting an indoor collegiate record with a time of 51.23 seconds. She was also the National Champion in the 400-meter dash at the 1985 NCAA Indoor Track & Field Championships, finishing with a time of 53.12 seconds.

Leatherwood competed for the United States in the 1984 Summer Olympics held in Los Angeles. Together with her teammates, Sherri Howard, Olympic 400 m champion Valerie Brisco-Hooks, and 400 m silver medalist Chandra Cheeseborough, she won gold in the 4 × 400 m relay.

On November 20, 1986, Leatherwood married her teammate and fellow Olympian, Emmit King, a member of Phi Beta Sigma.

She won the British AAA Championships title in the 400 metres event at the 1990 AAA Championships.

Leatherwood now resides in Tuscaloosa, Alabama and is no longer married to Emmit King. She retired after a career in the Tuscaloosa City Police Department.
