= 1991 IAAF World Indoor Championships =

3rd IAAF World Indoor Championships
- Dates: 8 March–10 March
- Host city: Seville, Spain
- Venue: Palacio Municipal de Deportes San Pablo
- Events: 26 (+1 non-championship)
- Participation: 518 athletes from 80 nations

The 3rd IAAF World Indoor Championships in Athletics were held at the Palacio Municipal de Deportes San Pablo in Seville, Spain from March 8 to March 10, 1991. It was the first Indoor Championships to include relay races as well as women's triple jump, albeit as a non-championship event. There were a total number of 518 athletes participated from 80 countries.

== Results ==
=== Men ===
1987 | 1989 | 1991 | 1993 | 1995

Event	Gold		Silver		Bronze	
60 metres	Andre Cason; United States	6.54	Linford Christie; Great Britain	6.55	Chidi Imoh; Nigeria	6.60
200 metres	Nikolay Antonov; Bulgaria	20.67	Linford Christie; Great Britain	20.72	Ade Mafe; Great Britain	20.92
400 metres	Devon Morris; Jamaica	46.17	Samson Kitur; Kenya	46.21	Cayetano Cornet; Spain	46.52
800 metres	Paul Ereng; Kenya	1:47.08	Tomás de Teresa; Spain	1:47.82	Simon Hoogewerf; Canada	1:47.88
1500 metres	Noureddine Morceli; Algeria	3:41.57	Fermín Cacho; Spain	3:42.68	Mário Silva; Portugal	3:43.85
3000 metres	Frank O'Mara; Ireland	7:41.14 (CR)	Hammou Boutayeb; Morocco	7:43.64	Robert Denmark; Great Britain	7:43.90
60 metres hurdles	Greg Foster; United States	7.45	Igors Kazanovs; Soviet Union	7.47	Mark McKoy; Canada	7.49
5000 metres walk	Mikhail Shchennikov; Soviet Union	18:23.55 (CR)	Giovanni De Benedictis; Italy	18:23.60	Frants Kostyukevich; Soviet Union	18:47.05
4 × 400 metres relay	Germany (GER); Rico Lieder, Jens Carlowitz, Karsten Just, Thomas Schönlebe	3:03.05 (WR)	United States (USA); Raymond Pierre, Charles Jenkins, Andrew Valmon, Antonio McKay, Clifton Campbell, Willie Smith	3:03.24 (AR)	Italy (ITA); Marco Vaccari, Vito Petrella, Alessandro Aimar, Andrea Nuti	3:05.51 (NR)
High jump	Hollis Conway; United States	2.40	Artur Partyka; Poland	2.37	Javier Sotomayor; Cuba	2.31
High jump	Hollis Conway; United States	2.40	Artur Partyka; Poland	2.37	Aleksey Yemelin; Soviet Union	2.31
Pole vault	Sergey Bubka; Soviet Union	6.00	Viktor Ryzhenkov; Soviet Union	5.80	Ferenc Salbert; France	5.70
Long jump	Dietmar Haaf; Germany	8.15	Jaime Jefferson; Cuba	8.04	Giovanni Evangelisti; Italy	7.93
Triple jump	Igor Lapshin; Soviet Union	17.31	Leonid Voloshin; Soviet Union	17.04	Tord Henriksson; Sweden	16.80
Shot put	Werner Günthör; Switzerland	21.17	Klaus Bodenmüller; Austria	20.42	Ron Backes; United States	20.06

=== Women ===
1987 | 1989 | 1991 | 1993 | 1995

Event	Gold		Silver		Bronze	
60 metres	Irina Sergeyeva; Soviet Union	7.02 (CR)	Merlene Ottey; Jamaica	7.08	Liliana Allen; Cuba	7.12 (NR)
200 metres	Merlene Ottey; Jamaica	22.24 (CR)	Irina Sergeyeva; Soviet Union	22.41	Grit Breuer; Germany	22.58
400 metres	Diane Dixon; United States	50.64 (CR)	Sandra Myers; Spain	50.99	Anita Protti; Switzerland	51.41 (NR)
800 metres	Christine Wachtel; Germany	2:01.51	Violeta Beclea; Romania	2:01.75	Ella Kovacs; Romania	2:01.79
1500 metres	Lyudmila Rogachova; Soviet Union	4:05.09	Ivana Kubešová; Czechoslovakia	4:06.22	Tudorița Chidu; Romania	4:06.27
3000 metres	Marie-Pierre Duros; France	8:50.69	Margareta Keszeg; Romania	8:51.51	Lyubov Kremlyova; Soviet Union	8:51.90
60 metres hurdles	Lyudmila Narozhilenko; Soviet Union	7.88	Monique Ewanjé-Épée; France	7.90	Aliuska López; Cuba	8.03
3000 metres walk	Beate Anders; Germany	11:50.90 (CR)	Kerry Saxby; Australia	12:03.21	Ileana Salvador; Italy	12:07.67
4 × 400 metres relay	Germany (GER); Sandra Seuser, Katrin Schreiter, Annett Hesselbarth, Grit Breuer	3:27.22 (WR)	Soviet Union (URS); Marina Shmonina, Lyudmila Dzhigalova, Margarita Ponomaryova, Aelita Yurchenko	3:27.95 (NR)	United States (USA); Terri Dendy, Lillie Leatherwood, Jearl Miles, Diane Dixon	3:29.00 (AR)
High jump	Heike Henkel; Germany	2.00	Tamara Bykova; Soviet Union	1.97	Heike Balck; Germany	1.94
Long jump	Larisa Berezhnaya; Soviet Union	6.84	Heike Drechsler; Germany	6.82	Marieta Ilcu; Romania	6.74
Shot put	Sui Xinmei; China	20.54 (CR)	Huang Zhihong; China	20.33	Natalya Lisovskaya; Soviet Union	20.00

==== Non-championship event ====
Games	Gold		Silver		Bronze	
Triple jump	Inessa Kravets; Soviet Union	14.44 (CR)	Li Huirong; China	13.98	Sofiya Bozhanova; Bulgaria	13.62

=== Medal table ===
Rank	Nation	Gold	Silver	Bronze	Total
1	Soviet Union (URS)	7	6	4	17
2	Germany (GER)	6	1	2	9
3	United States (USA)	4	1	2	7
4	Jamaica (JAM)	2	1	0	3
5	France (FRA)	1	1	1	3
6	China (CHN)	1	1	0	2
6	Kenya (KEN)	1	1	0	2
8	Switzerland (SUI)	1	0	1	2
9	Algeria (ALG)	1	0	0	1
9	Bulgaria (BUL)	1	0	0	1
9	Ireland (IRL)	1	0	0	1
12	Spain (ESP)	0	3	1	4
13	Romania (ROM)	0	2	3	5
14	Great Britain (GBR)	0	2	2	4
15	Cuba (CUB)	0	1	3	4
15	Italy (ITA)	0	1	3	4
17	Australia (AUS)	0	1	0	1
17	Austria (AUT)	0	1	0	1
17	Czechoslovakia (TCH)	0	1	0	1
17	Morocco (MAR)	0	1	0	1
17	Poland (POL)	0	1	0	1
22	Canada (CAN)	0	0	2	2
23	Nigeria (NGR)	0	0	1	1
23	Portugal (POR)	0	0	1	1
23	Sweden (SWE)	0	0	1	1
Totals (25 entries)		26	26	27	79

== Participating nations ==
- Algeria (4)
- Andorra (1)
- Angola (2)
- Anguilla (1)
- Argentina (2)
- Australia (12)
- Austria (9)
- Bahamas (3)
- Belgium (3)
- Bermuda (1)
- Bolivia (2)
- Botswana (1)
- Brazil (6)
- Bulgaria (8)
- Burundi (2)
- Cameroon (2)
- Canada (14)
- Chile (3)
- China (13)
- Chinese Taipei (2)
- Colombia (2)
- Cuba (13)
- Cyprus (1)
- Czechoslovakia (16)
- Denmark (2)
- Dominican Republic (2)
- Ecuador (2)
- Ethiopia (2)
- Finland (6)
- France (17)
- Germany (43)
- Ghana (2)
- Great Britain (21)
- Greece (4)
- Guinea (1)
- Hungary (7)
- Iceland (3)
- Ireland (6)
- Israel (2)
- Italy (17)
- Ivory Coast (2)
- Jamaica (10)
- Japan (4)
- Kenya (6)
- Luxembourg (1)
- Madagascar (1)
- Malaysia (1)
- Mauritius (1)
- Morocco (8)
- Netherlands (8)
- Netherlands Antilles (1)
- New Zealand (2)
- Nigeria (5)
- Norway (5)
- Pakistan (1)
- Paraguay (1)
- Peru (2)
- Poland (10)
- Portugal (5)
- Republic of the Congo (2)
- Romania (18)
- Rwanda (1)
- Senegal (3)
- Sierra Leone (1)
- South Korea (1)
- Soviet Union (42)
- Spain (36)
- Swaziland (2)
- Sweden (5)
- Switzerland (3)
- Tanzania (2)
- Trinidad and Tobago (5)
- Tunisia (1)
- Turkey (1)
- Turks and Caicos Islands (1)
- United States (49)
- United States Virgin Islands (2)
- Uruguay (2)
- Yugoslavia (5)
- Zambia (2)

== See also ==
- 1991 in athletics (track and field)
