= 1991 World Championships in Athletics =

Athletics competition in Tokyo, Japan

3rd World Championships in Athletics
- Host city: Tokyo, Japan
- Nations: 167
- Athletes: 1517
- Dates: August 23 – September 1, 1991
- Opened by: Emperor Akihito
- Main venue: Olympic Stadium

The 3rd World Championships in Athletics (Japanese: 1991年世界陸上競技選手権大会), under the auspices of the International Association of Athletics Federations, were held in the Olympic Stadium in Tokyo, Japan between August 23 and September 1, 1991. 1,517 athletes from 167 countries participated in the event. Japan hosted again the championship in 2007 in Osaka and Tokyo hosted the event again in 2025 in a new venue built at the same location.

The event is best-remembered for the men's long jump competition, when Carl Lewis made the best six-jump series in history, only to be beaten by Mike Powell, whose 8.95 m (29 ft 4.36 in) jump broke Bob Beamon's long-standing world record from the 1968 Summer Olympics.

East and West Germany reunified into a single nation in 1990. As a result, this was the first global athletics championship since the 1964 Summer Olympics in which all German athletes competed as a single team.

== Men's results ==
=== Track ===
1983 | 1987 | 1991 | 1993 | 1995

Games	Gold		Silver		Bronze	
100 m	Carl Lewis (USA)	9.86 (WR)	Leroy Burrell (USA)	9.88 (PB)	Dennis Mitchell (USA)	9.91 (PB)
200 m	Michael Johnson (USA)	20.01 (CR)	Frankie Fredericks (NAM)	20.34	Atlee Mahorn (CAN)	20.49
400 m	Antonio Pettigrew (USA)	44.57	Roger Black (GBR)	44.62	Danny Everett (USA)	44.63
800 m	Billy Konchellah (KEN)	1:43.99	José Luíz Barbosa (BRA)	1:44.24	Mark Everett (USA)	1:44.67
1500 m	Noureddine Morceli (ALG)	3:32.84 (CR)	Wilfred Kirochi (KEN)	3:34.84	Hauke Fuhlbrügge (GER)	3:35.28
5000 m	Yobes Ondieki (KEN)	13:14.45 (CR)	Fita Bayisa (ETH)	13:16.64	Brahim Boutayeb (MAR)	13:22.70
10,000 m	Moses Tanui (KEN)	27:38.74	Richard Chelimo (KEN)	27:39.41	Khalid Skah (MAR)	27:41.74
Marathon	Hiromi Taniguchi (JPN)	2:14:57	Hussein Ahmed Salah (DJI)	2:15:26	Steve Spence (USA)	2:15:36
110 m hurdles	Greg Foster (USA)	13.06	Jack Pierce (USA)	13.06	Tony Jarrett (GBR)	13.25
400 m hurdles	Samuel Matete (ZAM)	47.64	Winthrop Graham (JAM)	47.74 (NR)	Kriss Akabusi (GBR)	47.86 (NR)
3000 m st.	Moses Kiptanui (KEN)	8:12.59	Patrick Sang (KEN)	8:13.44	Azzedine Brahmi (ALG)	8:15.54
20 km walk	Maurizio Damilano (ITA)	1:19:37 (CR)	Mikhail Shchennikov (URS)	1:19:46	Yevgeniy Misyulya (URS)	1:20:22
50 km walk	Aleksandr Potashov (URS)	3:53:09	Andrey Perlov (URS)	3:53:09	Hartwig Gauder (GER)	3:55:14
4 × 100 m relay	United States (USA); Andre Cason; Leroy Burrell; Dennis Mitchell; Carl Lewis; Michael Marsh*	37.50 (WR)	France (FRA); Max Morinière; Daniel Sangouma; Jean-Charles Trouabal; Bruno Marie-Rose	37.87	Great Britain (GBR); Tony Jarrett; John Regis; Darren Braithwaite; Linford Christie	38.09
4 × 400 m relay	Great Britain (GBR); Roger Black; Derek Redmond; John Regis; Kriss Akabusi; Ade Mafe*; Mark Richardson*	2:57.53 (AR)	United States (USA); Andrew Valmon; Quincy Watts; Danny Everett; Antonio Pettigrew; Jeff Reynolds*; Mark Everett*	2:57.57	Jamaica (JAM); Patrick O'Connor; Devon Morris; Winthrop Graham; Seymour Fagan; Howard Burnett*	3:00.10
WR world record | AR area record | CR championship record | GR games record | NR national record | OR Olympic record | PB personal best | SB season best | WL world leading (in a given season)

Note: * Indicates athletes who ran in preliminary rounds.

=== Field ===
1983 | 1987 | 1991 | 1993 | 1995

Games	Gold		Silver		Bronze	
Long jump	Mike Powell (USA)	8.95 (WR)	Carl Lewis (USA)	8.91w	Larry Myricks (USA)	8.42
Triple jump	Kenny Harrison (USA)	17.78	Leonid Voloshin (URS)	17.75	Mike Conley (USA)	17.62
High jump	Charles Austin (USA)	2.38 (CR)	Javier Sotomayor (CUB)	2.36	Hollis Conway (USA)	2.36
Pole vault	Sergey Bubka (URS)	5.95 (CR)	István Bagyula (HUN)	5.90	Maksim Tarasov (URS)	5.85
Shot put	Werner Günthör (SUI)	21.67	Lars Arvid Nilsen (NOR)	20.75^{1}	Aleksandr Klimenko (URS)	20.34
Discus throw	Lars Riedel (GER)	66.20	Erik de Bruin (NED)	65.82	Attila Horváth (HUN)	65.32
Hammer throw	Yuriy Sedykh (URS)	81.70	Igor Astapkovich (URS)	80.94	Heinz Weis (GER)	80.44
Javelin throw	Kimmo Kinnunen (FIN)	90.82	Seppo Räty (FIN)	88.12	Uladzimir Sasimovich (URS)	87.08
Decathlon	Dan O'Brien (USA)	8812 (CR)	Mike Smith (CAN)	8549	Christian Schenk (GER)	8394
WR world record | AR area record | CR championship record | GR games record | NR national record | OR Olympic record | PB personal best | SB season best | WL world leading (in a given season)

^{1} Georg Andersen of Norway originally won the silver medal, but he was disqualified after he tested positive for steroids.

== Women's results ==
=== Track ===
1983 | 1987 | 1991 | 1993 | 1995

Games	Gold		Silver		Bronze	
100 m	Katrin Krabbe (GER)	10.99	Gwen Torrence (USA)	11.03	Merlene Ottey (JAM)	11.06
200 m	Katrin Krabbe (GER)	22.09	Gwen Torrence (USA)	22.16	Merlene Ottey (JAM)	22.21
400 m	Marie-José Pérec (FRA)	49.13	Grit Breuer (GER)	49.42	Sandra Myers (ESP)	49.78
800 m	Liliya Nurutdinova (URS)	1:57.50	Ana Fidelia Quirot (CUB)	1:57.55	Ella Kovacs (ROU)	1:57.58
1500 m	Hassiba Boulmerka (ALG)	4:02.21	Tetyana Dorovskikh (URS)	4:02.58	Lyudmila Rogachova (URS)	4:02.72
3000 m	Tetyana Dorovskikh (URS)	8:35.82	Yelena Romanova (URS)	8:36.06	Susan Sirma (KEN)	8:39.41 (AR)
10,000 m	Liz McColgan (GBR)	31:14.31	Zhong Huandi (CHN)	31:35.08	Wang Xiuting (CHN)	31:35.99
Marathon	Wanda Panfil (POL)	2:29:53	Sachiko Yamashita (JPN)	2:29:57	Katrin Dörre (GER)	2:30:10
100 m hurdles	Ludmila Narozhilenko (URS)	12.59	Gail Devers (USA)	12.63	Nataliya Grygoryeva (URS)	12.69
400 m hurdles	Tatyana Ledovskaya (URS)	53.11 (CR)	Sally Gunnell (GBR)	53.16; NR	Janeene Vickers (USA)	53.47
10 km walk	Alina Ivanova (URS)	42:57 (CR)	Madelein Svensson (SWE)	43:13	Sari Essayah (FIN)	43:13
4 × 100 m relay	Jamaica (JAM); Dahlia Duhaney; Juliet Cuthbert; Beverly McDonald; Merlene Ottey; Merlene Frazer*	41.94 (NR)	Soviet Union (URS); Natalya Kovtun; Galina Malchugina; Yelena Vinogradova; Irina Privalova	42.20	Germany (GER); Grit Breuer; Katrin Krabbe; Sabine Richter; Heike Drechsler	42.33
4 × 400 m relay	Soviet Union (URS); Tatyana Ledovskaya; Lyudmila Dzhigalova; Olga Nazarova; Olha Bryzhina; Anna Chuprina*; Tatyana Alekseyeva*	3:18.43	United States (USA); Rochelle Stevens; Diane Dixon; Jearl Miles; Lillie Leatherwood; Natasha Kaiser-Brown*	3:20.15	Germany (GER); Uta Rohländer; Katrin Krabbe; Christine Wachtel; Grit Breuer; Annett Hesselbarth*; Katrin Schreiter*	3:21.25
WR world record | AR area record | CR championship record | GR games record | NR national record | OR Olympic record | PB personal best | SB season best | WL world leading (in a given season)

Note: * Indicates athletes who ran in preliminary rounds.

=== Field ===
1983 | 1987 | 1991 | 1993 | 1995

Games	Gold		Silver		Bronze	
Long jump	Jackie Joyner-Kersee (USA)	7.32	Heike Drechsler (GER)	7.29	Larysa Berezhna (URS)	7.11
High jump	Heike Henkel (GER)	2.05	Yelena Yelesina (URS)	1.98	Inha Babakova (URS)	1.96
Shot put	Huang Zhihong (CHN)	20.83	Natalya Lisovskaya (URS)	20.29	Svetlana Krivelyova (URS)	20.16
Discus throw	Tsvetanka Khristova (BUL)	71.02	Ilke Wyludda (GER)	69.12	Larisa Mikhalchenko (URS)	68.26
Javelin throw	Xu Demei (CHN)	68.78	Petra Meier (GER)	68.68	Silke Renk (GER)	66.80
Heptathlon	Sabine Braun (GER)	6672	Liliana Năstase (ROU)	6493	Irina Belova (URS)	6448
WR world record | AR area record | CR championship record | GR games record | NR national record | OR Olympic record | PB personal best | SB season best | WL world leading (in a given season)

Note: * Indicates athletes who only ran in the preliminary round and also received medals.

== Medal table ==
* Host nation (Japan)

Rank	Nation	Gold	Silver	Bronze	Total
1	United States (USA)	10	8	8	26
2	Soviet Union (URS)	9	9	11	29
3	Germany (GER)	5	4	8	17
4	Kenya (KEN)	4	3	1	8
5	Great Britain (GBR)	2	2	3	7
6	China (CHN)	2	1	1	4
7	Algeria (ALG)	2	0	1	3
8	Jamaica (JAM)	1	1	3	5
9	Finland (FIN)	1	1	1	3
10	France (FRA)	1	1	0	2
10	Japan (JPN)*	1	1	0	2
12	Bulgaria (BUL)	1	0	0	1
12	Italy (ITA)	1	0	0	1
12	Poland (POL)	1	0	0	1
12	Switzerland (SUI)	1	0	0	1
12	Zambia (ZAM)	1	0	0	1
17	Cuba (CUB)	0	2	0	2
18	Canada (CAN)	0	1	1	2
18	Hungary (HUN)	0	1	1	2
18	Romania (ROU)	0	1	1	2
21	Brazil (BRA)	0	1	0	1
21	Djibouti (DJI)	0	1	0	1
21	Ethiopia (ETH)	0	1	0	1
21	Namibia (NAM)	0	1	0	1
21	Netherlands (NED)	0	1	0	1
21	Norway (NOR)	0	1	0	1
21	Sweden (SWE)	0	1	0	1
28	Morocco (MAR)	0	0	2	2
29	Spain (ESP)	0	0	1	1
Totals (29 entries)		43	43	43	129

== See also ==
- 1991 in athletics (track and field)
