= 1998 European Cup (athletics) =

- Dates: 27–28 June (Super Leagues); 5–7 June (First & Second Leagues)
- Host city: St. Petersburg, Russia
- Level: Senior
- Type: Outdoor
- Events: 39

The 1998 European Cup was the 19th edition of the European Cup of athletics.

The Super League Finals were held in St. Petersburg, Russia. The first two teams qualified for the 1998 IAAF World Cup

== Super League ==
Held on 27 and 28 June in St. Petersburg, Russia

=== Team standings ===
Men
Pos.	Nation	Points
1	Great Britain	111
2	Germany	108.5
3	Russia	102
4	Italy	101
5	France	89.5
6	Czech Republic	87
7	Spain	67.5
8	Finland	52.5

Women
Pos.	Nation	Points
1	Russia	124
2	Germany	108
3	France	93
4	Czech Republic	89
5	Great Britain	81
6	Italy	78
7	Ukraine	64
8	Slovenia	45

=== Results summary ===
==== Men's events ====
Event	Gold		Silver		Bronze	
100 m (Wind: -0.4 m/s)	Stéphane Cali; France	10.32	Aleksandr Porkhomovskiy; Russia	10.40	Colin Jackson; Great Britain	10.41
200 m (Wind: +1.4 m/s)	Douglas Walker; Great Britain	20.42	Christophe Cheval; France	20.61	Alessandro Attene; Italy	20.69
400 m	Mark Richardson; Great Britain	45.81	Jan Podebradský; Czech Republic	46.10	Dmitriy Golovastov; Russia	46.50
800 m	Andrea Longo; Italy	1:45.40	Lukáš Vydra; Czech Republic	1:45.92	Andy Hart; Great Britain	1:46.19
1500 m	Giuseppe D'Urso; Italy	3:44.58	Reyes Estévez; Spain	3:44.91	John Mayock; Great Britain	3:45.09
3000 m	Dieter Baumann; Germany	7:41.92	Manuel Pancorbo; Spain	7:42.24	Anthony Whiteman; Great Britain	7:43.61
5000 m	Alberto García; Spain	13:37.45	Mustapha Essaïd; France	13:37.79	Stéphane Franke; Germany	13:38.90
3000 m steeplechase	Alessandro Lambruschini; Italy	8:32.96	André Green; Germany	8:34.21	Mohamed Bélabbès; France	8:35.12
110 m hurdles (Wind: 0.0 m/s)	Colin Jackson; Great Britain	13.17	Falk Balzer; Germany	13.22	Jean-Marc Grava; France	13.63
400 m hurdles	Ruslan Mashchenko; Russia	48.49	Fabrizio Mori; Italy	48.57	Steffen Kolb; Germany	49.43
4 × 100 m	Great Britain; Allyn Condon; Darren Campbell; Doug Walker; Julian Golding	38.56	France; Emmanuel Bangué; Frédéric Krantz; Christophe Cheval; Stéphane Cali	38.90	Russia; Sergey Bychkov; Aleksandr Porkhomovskiy; Andrey Grigoriev; Andrey Fedoriv	39.13
4 × 400 m	Great Britain; Roger Black; Jamie Baulch; Iwan Thomas; Mark Richardson	3:00.95	Italy; Walter Pirovano; Marco Vaccari; Edoardo Vallet; Fabrizio Mori	3:03.45	France; Bruno Wavelet; Marc Foucan; Marc Raquil; Fred Mango	3:03.57
High jump	Sergey Klyugin; Russia	2.28	Ben Challenger; Great Britain	2.28	Tomáš Janku; Czech Republic	2.25
Pole vault	Yevgeniy Smiryagin; Russia	5.60	Javier García; Spain; Heikki Vääräniemi; Finland	5.50		
Long jump	Kirill Sosunov; Russia	8.38	Milan Kovár; Czech Republic	8.14	Nathan Morgan; Great Britain	7.85
Triple jump	Jonathan Edwards; Great Britain	17.29	Jirí Kuntoš; Czech Republic	16.91	Hrvoje Verzi; Germany	16.74
Shot put	Mika Halvari; Finland	20.79	Oliver-Sven Buder; Germany	19.97	Manuel Martínez; Spain	19.86
Discus throw	Dmitriy Shevchenko; Russia	65.14	Jürgen Schult; Germany	64.37	Diego Fortuna; Italy	62.49
Hammer throw	Heinz Weis; Germany	79.68	Ilya Konovalov; Russia	79.68	Enrico Sgrulletti; Italy	78.13
Javelin throw	Boris Henry; Germany	84.77	Sergey Makarov; Russia	84.37	Aki Parviainen; Finland	84.33
WR world record | AR area record | CR championship record | GR games record | NR national record | OR Olympic record | PB personal best | SB season best | WL world leading (in a given season)

==== Women's events ====
Event	Gold		Silver		Bronze	
100 m (Wind: +1.2 m/s)	Irina Privalova; Russia	11.04	Christine Arron; France	11.14	Andrea Philipp; Germany	11.26
200 m (Wind: -0.9 m/s)	Erika Suchovská; Czech Republic	22.96	Sylviane Félix; France	22.96	Melanie Paschke; Germany	22.98
400 m	Helena Fuchsová; Czech Republic	51.33	Irina Rosikhina; Russia	51.48	Allison Curbishley; Great Britain	51.48
800 m	Larisa Mikhaylova; Russia	1:58.01	Irina Lishchinskaya; Ukraine	1:59.15	Ludmila Formanová; Czech Republic	1:59.44
1500 m	Olga Komyagina; Russia	4:05.88	Paula Radcliffe; Great Britain	4:05.92	Andrea Šuldesová; Czech Republic	4:06.25
3000 m	Olga Yegorova; Russia	9:04.03	Blandine Bitzner-Ducret; France	9:06.74	Luminita Zaituc; Germany	9:10.18
5000 m	Paula Radcliffe; Great Britain	15:06.87	Kristina da Fonseca-Wollheim; Germany	15:10.33	Joalsiae Llado; France	15:17.58
100 m hurdles (Wind: 0.0 m/s)	Brigita Bukovec; Slovenia	12.89	Patricia Girard; France	12.89	Tatyana Reshetnikova; Russia	13.06
400 m hurdles	Tatyana Tereshchuk; Ukraine	54.15	Yekaterina Bakhvalova; Russia	54.72	Silvia Rieger; Germany	54.93
4 × 100 m	Russia; Yekaterina Grigoryeva; Galina Malchugina; Natalya Voronova; Irina Privalova	42.49	Germany; Melanie Paschke; Gabi Rockmeier; Birgit Rockmeier; Andrea Philipp	42.59	France; Linda Khodadin; Christine Arron; Patricia Girard; Sylviane Félix	42.61
4 × 400 m	Russia; Tatyana Chebykina; Natalya Khrushchelyova; Yekaterina Bakhvalova; Irina Rosikhina	3:25.52	Czech Republic; Jitka Burianová; Ludmila Formanová; Hana Benešová; Helena Fuchsová	3:28.05	Great Britain; Michelle Pierre; Donna Fraser; Michelle Thomas; Allison Curbishley	3:28.07
High jump	Zuzana Kováčiková; Czech Republic	1.98	Alina Astafei; Germany	1.95	Yelena Gulyayeva; Czech Republic	1.95
Pole vault	Daniela Bártová; Czech Republic	4.35; CR	Janine Whitlock; Great Britain	4.30	Nicole Rieger; Germany	4.20
Long jump	Fiona May; Italy	7.08	Lyudmila Galkina; Russia	6.84	Linda Ferga; France	6.75
Triple jump	Fiona May; Italy	14.65	Šárka Kašpárková; Czech Republic	14.63	Yelena Govorova; Ukraine	14.13
Shot put	Irina Korzhanenko; Russia	20.65	Judy Oakes; Great Britain	18.38	Stephanie Storp; Germany	18.38
Discus throw	Natalya Sadova; Russia	64.18	Anja Möllenbeck; Germany	60.80	Yelena Antonova; Ukraine	59.28
Hammer throw	Olga Kuzenkova; Russia	65.89	Kirsten Münchow; Germany	64.86	Cécile Lignot; France	61.12
Javelin throw	Tanja Damaske; Germany	62.30	Nikola Tomecková; Czech Republic	60.82	Oksana Makarova; Russia	58.38
WR world record | AR area record | CR championship record | GR games record | NR national record | OR Olympic record | PB personal best | SB season best | WL world leading (in a given season)

== First League ==
The First League was held on 5 and 6 June

=== Men ===
Group A
Held in Budapest, Hungary

Pos.	Nation	Points
1	Greece	120.5
2	Hungary	107.5
3	Ukraine	105
4	Romania	88
5	Switzerland	88
6	Slovenia	74
7	Portugal	68.5
8	Slovakia	63.5

Group B
Held in Malmö, Sweden

Pos.	Nation	Points
1	Poland	125.5
2	Sweden	106.5
3	Norway	97.5
4	Netherlands	96.5
5	Belarus	86
6	Belgium	74
7	Latvia	70
8	Denmark	63

=== Women ===
Group A
Held in Budapest, Hungary

Pos.	Nation	Points
1	Romania	135
2	Greece	102.5
3	Hungary	94
4	Spain	89
5	Bulgaria	82
6	Switzerland	74
7	Portugal	69.5
8	Slovakia	37

Group B
Held in Malmö, Sweden

Pos.	Nation	Points
1	Poland	117
2	Belarus	108
3	Finland	95
4	Sweden	88
5	Netherlands	78
6	Denmark	69
7	Latvia	68
8	Norway	58

== Second League ==
The Second League was held on 6 and 7 June

=== Men ===
Group A
Held in Kaunas, Lithuania

Pos.	Nation	Points
1	Ireland	89
2	Austria	83.5
3	Croatia	79.5
4	Estonia	68
5	Lithuania	62
6	AASSE	38

Group B
Held in Belgrade, Yugoslavia

Pos.	Nation	Points
1	Yugoslavia	129
2	Cyprus	110
3	Turkey	107
4	Israel	101
5	Bulgaria	99
6	Moldova	75
7	Albania	46
8	Armenia	37

=== Women ===
Group A
Held in Kaunas, Lithuania

Pos.	Nation	Points
1	Belgium	105
2	Ireland	98
3	Lithuania	89
4	Austria	79
5	Estonia	76
6	Croatia	57
7	AASSE	25

Group B
Held in Belgrade, Yugoslavia

Pos.	Nation	Points
1	Yugoslavia	136
2	Turkey	125
3	Moldova	95
4	Israel	92
5	Cyprus	89
6	Albania	62
7	Macedonia	41
8	Armenia	16
