= 1999 European Cup Super League =

These are the full results of the 1999 European Cup Super League in athletics which was held on 19 and 20 June 1999 at the Stade Charléty in Paris, France.

== Team standings ==
Men
Pos.	Nation	Points
1	Germany	122
2	Italy	98.5
3	Great Britain	97
4	Russia	95
5	France	81.5
6	Greece	80
7	Poland	79
8	Czech Republic	62

Women
Place	Pays	Points
1	Russia	127
2	Romania	99
3	France	97
4	Germany	93.5
5	Italy	71
6	Great Britain	68.5
7	Poland	65
8	Czech Republic	62

== Men's results ==
=== 100 metres ===
19 June
Wind: -0.8 m/s

Rank	Name	Nationality	Time	Notes	Points
1	Dwain Chambers	Great Britain	10.21		8
2	Stefano Tilli	Italy	10.32		7
3	Piotr Balcerzak	Poland	10.35		6
4	Hristoforos Hoidis	Greece	10.38		5
5	Stéphane Cali	France	10.47		4
6	Martin Duda	Czech Republic	10.49		3
7	Patrick Schneider	Germany	10.54		2
8	Sergey Slukin	Russia	10.60		1

=== 200 metres ===
20 June
Wind: +0.2 m/s

Rank	Name	Nationality	Time	Notes	Points
1	Marcin Urbas	Poland	20.34		8
2	Alexios Alexopoulos	Greece	20.36		7
3	Julian Golding	Great Britain	20.49		6
4	Holger Blume	Germany	20.82		5
5	Aleksandr Ryabov	Russia	20.84		4
6	Alessandro Attene	Italy	21.05		3
7	Martin Morkes	Czech Republic	21.36		2
	Frédéric Krantz	France	DQ		0

=== 400 metres ===
19 June

Rank	Name	Nationality	Time	Notes	Points
1	Mark Richardson	Great Britain	44.96		8
2	Dmitriy Golovastov	Russia	45.59		7
3	Konstantinos Kenteris	Greece	45.66		6
4	Robert Mackowiak	Poland	45.69		5
5	Stefan Holz	Germany	45.81		4
6	Marc Raquil	France	45.82		3
7	Jirí Mužík	Czech Republic	46.82		2
8	Edoardo Vallet	Italy	46.92		1

=== 800 metres ===
20 June

Rank	Name	Nationality	Time	Notes	Points
1	Yuriy Borzakovskiy	Russia	1:48.53		8
2	Nico Motchebon	Germany	1:48.75		7
3	Roman Oravec	Czech Republic	1:48.87		6
4	Davide Cadoni	Italy	1:48.89		5
5	Wojciech Kaldowski	Poland	1:49.16		4
6	David Divad	France	1:49.35		3
7	Andrew Hart	Great Britain	1:49.38		2
8	Panagiotis Stroubakos	Greece	1:50.94		1

=== 1500 metres ===
19 June

Rank	Name	Nationality	Time	Notes	Points
1	Giuseppe D'Urso	Italy	3:46.01		8
2	Rüdiger Stenzel	Germany	3:46.58		7
3	Nadir Bosch	France	3:46.75		6
4	John Mayock	Great Britain	3:47.08		5
5	Roman Oravec	Czech Republic	3:47.08		4
6	Panagiotis Stroubakos	Greece	3:47.56		3
7	Leszek Zblewski	Poland	3:48.18		2
8	Andrey Zadorozhnyi	Russia	3:48.21		1

=== 3000 metres ===
20 June

Rank	Name	Nationality	Time	Notes	Points
1	Salvatore Vincenti	Italy	7:59.12		8
2	Vyacheslav Shabunin	Russia	7:59.47		7
3	Driss Maazouzi	France	7:59.52		6
4	Dieter Baumann	Germany	8:01.03		5
5	Glen Stewart	Great Britain	8:02.39		4
6	Panagiotis Papoulias	Greece	8:02.95		3
7	Lubomír Pokorný	Czech Republic	8:04.95		2
8	Adam Draczyński	Poland	8:16.80		1

=== 5000 metres ===
19 June

Rank	Name	Nationality	Time	Notes	Points
1	Gennaro Di Napoli	Italy	13:53.37		8
2	Halez Taguelmint	France	13:57.35		7
3	Sergey Drygin	Russia	14:00.99		6
4	Mike Openshaw	Great Britain	14:01.37		5
5	Sebastian Hallmann	Germany	14:02.78		4
6	Piotr Gladki	Poland	14:03.58		3
7	Adonis Papadonis	Greece	14:04.94		2
8	Tomáš Krutský	Czech Republic	14:36.39		1

=== 110 metres hurdles ===
20 June
Wind: +0.5 m/s

Rank	Name	Nationality	Time	Notes	Points
1	Falk Balzer	Germany	13.21		8
2	Tony Jarrett	Great Britain	13.31		7
3	Tomasz Scigaczewski	Poland	13.48		6
4	Dan Philibert	France	13.49		5
5	Andrea Giaconi	Italy	13.66		4
6	Roman Šebrle	Czech Republic	13.92		3
7	Stamatios Magos	Greece	13.97		2
8	Yevgeniy Pechenkin	Russia	14.34		1

=== 400 metres hurdles ===
19 June

Rank	Name	Nationality	Time	Notes	Points
1	Fabrizio Mori	Italy	48.68		8
2	Thomas Goller	Germany	48.88		7
3	Pawel Januszewski	Poland	48.94		6
4	Ruslan Mashchenko	Russia	49.39		5
5	Chris Rawlinson	Great Britain	49.65		4
6	Stéphane Diagana	France	49.66		3
7	Jirí Mužík	Czech Republic	50.26		2
8	Periklis Iakovakis	Greece	50.33		1

=== 3000 metres steeplechase ===
20 June

Rank	Name	Nationality	Time	Notes	Points
1	Gaël Pencreach	France	8:27.78		8
2	Damian Kallabis	Germany	8:27.85		7
3	Giuseppe Maffei	Italy	8:27.94		6
4	Rafal Wójcik	Poland	8:34.14		5
5	Vladimir Pronin	Russia	8:38.31		4
6	Chris Stephenson	Great Britain	8:39.12		3
7	Michael Nejedlý	Czech Republic	8:42.57		2
8	Adonios Vouzis	Greece	8:45.24		1

=== 4 × 100 metres relay ===
19 June

Rank	Nation	Athletes	Time	Note	Points
1	Great Britain	Jason Gardener, Darren Campbell, Marlon Devonish, Julian Golding	38.16	CR	8
2	Greece	Vasilios Segos, Alexios Alexopoulos, Georgios Panagiotopoulos, Hristoforos Hoidis	38.61	NR	7
3	Germany	Alexander Kosenkow, Patrick Schneider, Holger Blume, Christian Schacht	38.88		6
4	France	David Patros, Frédéric Krantz, Christophe Cheval, Stéphane Cali	38.94		5
5	Czech Republic	Martin Morkes, Ludvík Bohman, Tomáš Drímal, Martin Duda	39.17		4
6	Russia	Valeriy Kirdyashev, Aleksandr Ryabov, Denis Nikolayev, Sergey Slukin	39.18		3
7	Italy	Andrea Amici, Giovanni Puggioni, Alessandro Attene, Stefano Tilli	39.25		2
8	Poland	Adam Forgheim, Marcin Urbas, Piotr Balcerzak, Ryszard Pilarczyk	39.29		1

=== 4 × 400 metres relay ===
20 June

Rank	Nation	Athletes	Time	Note	Points
1	Great Britain	Mark Hylton, Jamie Baulch, Solomon Wariso, Mark Richardson	3:00.61		8
2	Poland	Piotr Rysiukiewicz, Robert Mackowiak, Tomasz Czubak, Piotr Haczek	3:01.06		7
3	Russia	Daniyil Shekin, Mikhail Vdovin, Andrey Semenov, Dmitriy Golovastov	3:03.22		6
4	France	Philippe Bouche, Marc Foucan, Willy Migerel, Marc Raquil	3:03.22		5
5	Greece	Stilianos Dimotsios, Anastasios Gousis, Periklis Iakovakis, Konstantinos Kenteris	3:03.22		4
6	Italy	Edoardo Vallet, Marco Vaccari, Alessandro Bracciali, Fabrizio Mori	3:07.13		3
7	Czech Republic	Jan Hanzl, Karel Bláha, Pavel Jelínek, Jirí Mužík	3:09.06		2
8	Germany	Stefan Holz, Marco Krause, Lars Figura, Thomas Goller	3:09.07		1

=== High jump ===
19 June

Rank	Name	Nationality	2.10	2.15	2.19	2.22	2.25	2.28	2.30	2.32	2.34	Result	Notes	Points
1	Martin Buß	Germany	–	–	o	o	o	o	xo	xxo	xxo	2.34		8
2	Vyacheslav Voronin	Russia	–	–	–	o	o	xo	o	o	xxx	2.32		7
3	Tomáš Janku	Czech Republic	o	o	o	xxo	xo	o	xxx			2.28		6
4	Steve Smith	Great Britain	–	xo	–	xo	o	xo	x–	xx		2.28		5
5	Dimitrios Kokotis	Greece	o	–	x–	o	x–	xx				2.22		4
6	Didier Detchénique	France	o	o	o	xxx						2.19		2.5
6	Ivan Bernasconi	Italy	o	o	o	xxx						2.19		2.5
8	Szymon Kuzma	Poland	o	xxo	xxx							2.15		1

=== Pole vault ===
20 June

Rank	Name	Nationality	4.80	5.00	5.15	5.30	5.45	5.55	5.60	5.65	Result	Notes	Points
1	Michael Stolle	Germany	–	–	–	–	o	–	–	xo	5.65		8
2	Radion Gataullin	Russia	–	–	–	–	o	–	xx–	x	5.45		7
3	Štepán Janácek	Czech Republic	–	–	o	o	xo	xxx			5.45		6
4	Stavros Tsitouras	Greece	–	?	xxo	o	xo	xxx			5.45		5
5	Przemyslaw Gurin	Poland	o	o	xo	o	xxx				5.30		4
6	Kevin Hughes	Great Britain	–	o	o	xxx					5.15		3
	Jean Galfione	France	–	–	–	–	xxx				NM		0
	Andrea Giannini	Italy	–	–	xxx						NM		0

=== Long jump ===
19 June

Rank	Name	Nationality	#1	#2	#3	#4	Result	Notes	Points
1	Emmanuel Bangué	France	7.76	7.73	7.97	7.97	7.97		8
2	Kofi Amoah Prah	Germany	7.75	x	7.85	x	7.85		7
3	Roberto Coltri	Italy	x	7.56	7.67	7.85	7.85		6
4	Konstadinos Koukodimos	Greece	7.84	7.53	–	x	7.84		5
5	Darren Ritchie	Great Britain	7.58	7.63	7.63	7.47	7.63		4
6	Grzegorz Marciniszyn	Poland	7.48	7.25	7.49	7.56	7.56		3
7	Kirill Sosunov	Russia	7.55	x	–	7.34	7.55		2
8	Tomáš Votava	Czech Republic	7.22	7.49	7.10	7.53	7.53		1

=== Triple jump ===
20 June

Rank	Name	Nationality	#1	#2	#3	#4	Result	Notes	Points
1	Denis Kapustin	Russia	17.28	x	17.40	–	17.40		8
2	Jonathan Edwards	Great Britain	16.89	17.10	17.20	17.24	17.24		7
3	Charles Michael Friedek	Germany	16.53	16.97	x	x	16.97		6
4	Paolo Camossi	Italy	16.21	16.77	16.88	x	16.88		5
5	Jérôme Romain	France	16.78	16.84	16.71	16.79	16.84		4
6	Hristos Meletoglou	Greece	16.65	x	16.79	x	16.79		3
7	Jirí Kuntoš	Czech Republic	16.30	x	x	16.55	16.55		2
	Jacek Kazimierowski	Poland	x	x	x	x	NM		0

=== Shot put ===
19 June

Rank	Name	Nationality	#1	#2	#3	#4	Result	Notes	Points
1	Oliver-Sven Buder	Germany	20.53	20.03	x	–	20.53		8
2	Paolo Dal Soglio	Italy	18.77	19.19	x	19.38	19.38		7
3	Vaios Tigas	Greece	18.41	18.71	18.24	18.22	18.71		6
4	Przemyslaw Zabawski	Poland	18.34	17.57	18.40	18.16	18.40		5
5	Stéphane Vial	France	17.94	18.38	18.22	18.17	18.38		4
6	Josef Rosulek	Czech Republic	18.06	17.87	18.18	18.17	18.18		3
7	Yevgeniy Palchikov	Russia	17.31	17.87	17.96	17.20	17.96		2
8	Mark Edwards	Great Britain	17.37	x	16.88	x	17.37		1

=== Discus throw ===
20 June

Rank	Name	Nationality	#1	#2	#3	#4	Result	Notes	Points
1	Jürgen Schult	Germany	64.08	63.69	64.86	65.68	65.68		8
2	Aleksandr Borichevskiy	Russia	60.78	62.22	63.26	61.01	63.26		7
3	Diego Fortuna	Italy	61.06	63.03	62.50	62.76	63.03		6
4	Libor Malina	Czech Republic	57.28	57.35	57.81	61.97	61.97		5
5	Jean-Claude Retel	France	60.68	58.24	58.85	59.47	60.68		4
6	Perris Wilkins	Great Britain	60.64	x	60.51	x	60.64		3
7	Andrzej Krawczyk	Poland	x	57.83	58.08	x	58.08		2
8	Savvas Panavoglou	Greece	47.64	53.38	54.60	54.15	54.60		1

=== Hammer throw ===
19 June

Rank	Name	Nationality	#1	#2	#3	#4	Result	Notes	Points
1	Hristos Polihroniou	Greece	x	75.84	79.72	78.78	79.72		8
2	Szymon Ziólkowski	Poland	74.41	76.68	78.67	76.28	78.67		7
3	Karsten Kobs	Germany	76.36	78.14	77.89	x	78.14		6
4	Nicola Vizzoni	Italy	74.32	75.74	75.12	x	75.74		5
5	Vladimír Maška	Czech Republic	75.21	74.65	73.79	73.69	75.21		4
6	David Chaussinand	France	74.69	73.17	74.90	x	74.90		3
7	Sergey Kirmasov	Russia	72.33	x	71.35	x	72.33		2
8	Mick Jones	Great Britain	72.04	70.12	69.65	70.77	72.04		1

=== Javelin throw ===
20 June

Rank	Name	Nationality	#1	#2	#3	#4	Result	Notes	Points
1	Raymond Hecht	Germany	86.05	x	84.39	81.33	86.05		8
2	Sergey Makarov	Russia	85.05	83.88	85.44	81.04	85.44		7
3	Kostas Gatsioudis	Greece	84.26	82.00	84.87	x	84.87		6
4	Mick Hill	Greece	77.47	78.80	79.65	x	79.65		5
5	Carlo Sonego	Italy	76.43	70.84	x	75.38	76.43		4
6	Dariusz Trafas	Poland	71.36	x	74.03	x	74.03		3
7	Miloš Steigauf	Czech Republic	73.82	69.51	x	x	73.82		2
8	David Brisseaud	France	72.44	69.65	71.61	73.10	73.10		1

== Women's results ==
=== 100 metres ===
19 June
Wind: +0.5 m/s

Rank	Name	Nationality	Time	Notes	Points
1	Christine Arron	France	10.97		8
2	Natalya Ignatova	Russia	11.22		7
3	Joice Maduaka	Great Britain	11.24		6
4	Ionela Târlea	Romania	11.30	NR	5
5	Manuela Levorato	Italy	11.30		4
6	Zuzanna Radecka	Poland	11.42		3
7	Andrea Philipp	Germany	11.42		2
8	Erika Suchovská	Czech Republic	11.56		1

=== 200 metres ===
20 June
Wind: +0.7 m/s

Rank	Name	Nationality	Time	Notes	Points
1	Svetlana Goncharenko	Russia	22.59		8
2	Sabrina Mulrain	Germany	22.73		7
3	Muriel Hurtis	France	22.83		6
4	Ionela Târlea	Romania	22.85		5
5	Manuela Levorato	Italy	22.90		4
6	Zuzanna Radecka	Poland	23.04		3
7	Hana Benešová	Czech Republic	23.13		2
8	Katharine Merry	Great Britain	23.25		1

=== 400 metres ===
19 June

Rank	Name	Nationality	Time	Notes	Points
1	Ionela Târlea	Romania	50.69		8
2	Olga Kotlyarova	Russia	51.19		7
3	Anja Rücker	Germany	51.28		6
4	Jitka Burianová	Czech Republic	51.72		5
5	Francine Landre	France	51.90		4
6	Virna De Angeli	Italy	52.19		3
7	Donna Fraser	Great Britain	52.48		2
8	Grazyna Prokopek	Poland	53.72		1

=== 800 metres ===
19 June

Rank	Name	Nationality	Time	Notes	Points
1	Natalya Tsyganova	Russia	1:58.18		8
2	Helena Fuchsová	Czech Republic	1:58.81		7
3	Viviane Dorsile	France	2:00.37		6
4	Elena Buhaianu	Romania	2:00.79		5
5	Diane Modahl	Great Britain	2:00.80		4
6	Claudia Salvarani	Italy	2:01.23		3
7	Heike Meißner	Germany	2:01.79		2
8	Aleksandra Deren	Poland	2:07.34		1

=== 1500 metres ===
20 June

Rank	Name	Nationality	Time	Notes	Points
1	Gabriela Szabo	Romania	4:13.63		8
2	Anna Jakubczak	Poland	4:13.90		7
3	Margarita Marusova	Russia	4:15.40		6
4	Hayley Tullett	Great Britain	4:15.70		5
5	Frédérique Quentin	France	4:16.36		4
6	Luminita Zaituc	Germany	4:17.41		3
7	Andrea Šuldesová	Czech Republic	4:18.29		2
8	Ilaria Di Santo	Italy	4:20.40		1

=== 3000 metres ===
19 June

Rank	Name	Nationality	Time	Notes	Points
1	Gabriela Szabo	Romania	8:36.35		8
2	Lidia Chojecka	Poland	8:38.77		7
3	Olga Yegorova	Russia	8:40.51		6
4	Yamna Belkacem	France	8:42.54		5
5	Silvia Sommaggio	Italy	8:59.05		4
6	Luminita Zaituc	Germany	9:02.07		3
7	Angela Newport	Great Britain	9:13.71		2
8	Renata Hoppová	Czech Republic	9:52.53		1

=== 5000 metres ===
20 June

Rank	Name	Nationality	Time	Notes	Points
1	Paula Radcliffe	Great Britain	14:48.79	CR	8
2	Irina Mikitenko	Germany	15:05.43		7
3	Iullia Olteanu	Romania	15:06.73		6
4	Maria Pantyukhova	Russia	15:08.73		5
5	Blandine Bitzner	France	15:13.96		4
6	Dorota Gruca	Poland	15:37.74		3
7	Maria Guida	Italy	15:40.26		2
8	Petra Drajzajtlová	Czech Republic	16:29.34		1

=== 100 metres hurdles ===
20 June
Wind: -0.4 m/s

Rank	Name	Nationality	Time	Notes	Points
1	Patricia Girard	France	12.96		8
2	Keri Maddox	Great Britain	12.97		7
3	Svetlana Laukhova	Russia	12.99		6
4	Iveta Rudová	Czech Republic	13.26		5
5	Margaret Macchiut	Italy	13.27		4
6	Kirsten Bolm	Germany	13.42		3
7	Anna Leszczyńska	Poland	13.46		2
8	Erica Niculaie	Romania	13.56		1

=== 400 metres hurdles ===
19 June

Rank	Name	Nationality	Time	Notes	Points
1	Silvia Rieger	Germany	55.09		8
2	Yekaterina Bakhvalova	Russia	55.61		7
3	Monika Niederstätter	Italy	56.09		6
4	Sinead Dudgeon	Great Britain	56.09		5
5	Cindy Ega	France	57.61		4
6	Georgeta Lazar	Romania	57.88		3
7	Anna Olichwierczuk	Poland	57.92		2
8	Martina Blažková	Czech Republic	1:00.77		1

=== 4 × 100 metres relay ===
19 June

Rank	Nation	Athletes	Time	Note	Points
1	France	Patricia Girard, Muriel Hurtis, Fabé Dia, Christine Arron	42.90		8
2	Russia	Natalya Ignatova, Oksana Ekk, Irina Khabarova, Svetlana Goncharenko	42.91		7
3	Germany	Gabi Rockmeier, Andrea Philipp, Birgit Rockmeier, Sabrina Mulrain	43.47		6
4	Poland	Marzena Pawlak, Joanna Nielacna, Monika Borejza, Zuzanna Radecka	43.99		5
5	Czech Republic	Pavlina Dlouhá, Erika Suchovská, Denisa Krejcová, Hana Benešová	44.35		4
6	Italy	Elena Apollonio, Annarita Luciano, Manuela Grillo, Manuela Levorato	44.43		3
7	Romania	Georgeta Lazar, Erica Niculaie, Evelina Lisenco, Eva Miklos	44.83		2
	Great Britain	Marcia Richardson, Shani Anderson, Christine Bloomfield, Joice Maduaka	DNF		2

=== 4 × 400 metres relay ===
20 June

Rank	Nation	Athletes	Time	Note	Points
1	Russia	Yekaterina Kulikova, Natalya Nazarova, Tatyana Chebykina, Olga Kotlyarova	3:24.61		8
2	Romania	Otilia Ruicu, Alina Rîpanu, Ana Maria Barbu, Ionela Târlea	3:25.68	NR	7
3	Romania	Jitka Burianová, Hana Benešová, Denisa Krejcová, Helena Fuchsová	3:25.76		6
4	Germany	Anja Knippel, Anke Feller, Martina Breu, Uta Rohländer	3:25.76		5
5	Italy	Danielle Perpoli, Patrizia Spuri, Francesca Carbone, Virna De Angeli	3:26.69	NR	4
6	France	Francine Landre, Sandrine Thiebaud, Viviane Dorsile, Fabienne Ficher	3:27.28		3
7	Great Britain	Sinead Dudgeon, Natasha Danvers, Helen Frost, Donna Fraser	3:28.59		2
8	Poland	Aneta Skarba, Aleksandra Pieluzek, Inga Tarnawska, Grazyna Prokopek	3:34.66		1

=== High jump ===
20 June

Rank	Name	Nationality	1.70	1.75	1.80	1.84	1.88	1.91	1.93	1.95	1.97	1.99	2.01	Result	Notes	Points
1	Yelena Gulyayeva	Russia	–	–	o	xo	o	o	xo	xo	o	xxo	–	1.99		8
2	Monica Dinescu	Romania	–	–	o	o	xo	o	xx–	o	o	xx–	x	1.97		7
3	Zuzana Hlavonová	Czech Republic	–	–	–	o	xo	o	o	o	x–	xx		1.95		6
4	Antonella Bevilacqua	Italy	–	–	o	o	o	xo	xxx					1.91		5
5	Amewu Mensah	Germany	–	o	o	o	xxo	xxx						1.88		3.5
5	Susan Jones	Great Britain	–	o	o	o	xxo	xxx						1.88		3.5
7	Guilaine Graw	France	o	o	o	xxx								1.80		2
8	Donata Jancewicz	Poland	–	–	xo	–	xxx							1.80		1

=== Pole vault ===
19 June

Rank	Name	Nationality	3.40	3.55	3.70	3.85	3.95	4.05	4.10	4.15	4.20	4.25	4.30	4.35	4.40	Result	Notes	Points
1	Nicole Humbert	Germany	–	–	–	–	–	–	–	–	o	–	xxo	xo	xxx	4.35		8
2	Marie Poissonnier	France	–	–	–	xxo	xxo	o	–	xo	xxo	xxo	o	x–	xx	4.30		7
3	Pavla Hamácková	Czech Republic	–	–	–	o	–	o	–	xo	–	o	xxx			4.25		6
4	Yelena Belyakova	Russia	–	–	–	–	–	o	–	–	o	–	xxx			4.20		5
5	Francesca Dolcini	Italy	o	–	o	o	xo	o	–	xxo	xxo	xx–	x			4.20		4
6	Gabriela Mihalcea	Romania	–	–	–	–	xo	xxo	xxo	xo	xxx					4.15		3
7	Janine Whitlock	Great Britain	–	–	–	xo	o	xxo	–	xxx						4.05		2
8	Aleksandra Granda	Poland	o	xo	o	xo	xxx									3.85	PB	1

=== Long jump ===
20 June

Rank	Name	Nationality	#1	#2	#3	#4	Result	Notes	Points
1	Fiona May	Italy	6.74	6.62	x	6.88	6.88		8
2	Eunice Barber	France	6.72	6.70	6.49	6.82	6.82		7
3	Lyudmila Galkina	Russia	6.54	6.66	6.64	6.64	6.66		6
4	Lucie Komrsková	Czech Republic	6.07	6.11	5.95	6.22	6.22		5
5	Bozena Trzcinska	Poland	6.01	6.17	5.99	x	6.17		4
6	Sarah Claxton	Great Britain	6.06	4.93	x	6.12	6.12		3
7	Nkechi Madubuko	Germany	5.97	5.71	r		5.97		2
8	Eva Miklos	Romania	5.94	5.83	5.78	5.80	5.94		1

=== Triple jump ===
19 June

Rank	Name	Nationality	#1	#2	#3	#4	Result	Notes	Points
1	Cristina Nicolau	Romania	14.25	14.34	14.61	x	14.61		8
2	Ashia Hansen	Great Britain	13.84	14.29	14.58	x	14.58		7
3	Fiona May	Italy	14.07	14.28	x	14.33	14.33		6
4	Yelena Lebedenko	Russia	13.09	14.16	x	14.04w	14.16		5
5	Sylvie Borda	France	13.80	13.73	13.81	13.51	13.81		4
6	Nkechi Madubuko	Germany	13.35	13.62	13.35	x	13.62		3
7	Eva Doležalová	Czech Republic	x	13.32	x	13.45	13.45		2
8	Ilona Pazola	Poland	13.27	13.00	13.24	12.83	13.27		1

=== Shot put ===
20 June

Rank	Name	Nationality	#1	#2	#3	#4	Result	Notes	Points
1	Krystyna Danilczyk	Poland	16.70	17.31	17.93	18.58	18.58		8
2	Nadine Kleinert	Germany	18.18	18.47	18.39	x	18.47		7
3	Svetlana Krivelyova	Russia	17.24	18.31	18.36	18.22	18.36		6
4	Mara Rosolen	Italy	17.49	18.16	17.76	17.77	18.16		5
5	Elena Hila	Romania	16.95	17.98	x	17.36	17.98		4
6	Judy Oakes	Great Britain	17.75	17.93	x	17.72	17.93		3
7	Laurence Manfredi	France	17.80	17.21	x	17.61	17.80		2
8	Zdenka Šilhavá	Czech Republic	15.72	15.51	x	15.99	15.99		1

=== Discus throw ===
19 June

Rank	Name	Nationality	#1	#2	#3	#4	Result	Notes	Points
1	Natalya Sadova	Russia	65.77	66.84	x	63.42	66.84		8
2	Nicoleta Grasu	Romania	x	62.95	65.04	65.85	65.85		7
3	Franka Dietzsch	Germany	65.14	63.80	x	65.72	65.72		6
4	Joanna Wisniewska	Poland	60.63	59.13	60.48	x	60.63		5
5	Shelley Drew	Great Britain	55.11	52.91	57.05	57.82	57.82		4
6	Isabelle Devaluez	France	57.18	x	x	55.66	57.18		3
7	Zdenka Šilhavá	Czech Republic	55.45	55.10	x	55.03	55.45		2
8	Mara Rosolen	Italy	x	54.26	53.30	53.14	54.26		1

=== Hammer throw ===
20 June

Rank	Name	Nationality	#1	#2	#3	#4	Result	Notes	Points
1	Mihaela Melinte	Romania	71.48	71.83	74.48	71.97	74.48	CR	8
2	Olga Kuzenkova	Russia	68.66	x	x	69.05	69.05		7
3	Florence Ezeh	France	65.64	x	x	x	65.64		6
4	Kamila Skolimowska	Poland	65.00	62.75	61.58	x	65.00		5
5	Kirsten Munchow	Germany	62.78	64.63	63.39	x	64.63		4
6	Lorraine Shaw	Great Britain	56.86	59.85	61.68	62.51	62.51		3
7	Ester Balassini	Italy	57.62	57.46	59.01	61.60	61.60		2
8	Lucie Vrbenská	Czech Republic	47.92	48.00	48.29	44.84	48.29		1

=== Javelin throw ===
19 June

Rank	Name	Nationality	#1	#2	#3	#4	Result	Notes	Points
1	Tanja Damaske	Germany	59.16	62.94	65.44	64.77	65.44		8
2	Oksana Makarova	Russia	59.31	59.33	61.41	64.61	64.61		7
3	Nadine Auzeil	France	x	52.39	61.08	x	61.08		6
4	Genowefa Patla	Poland	55.18	61.05	52.25	x	61.05		5
5	Nikola Tomecková	Czech Republic	57.72	x	58.93	x	58.93		4
6	Ana Mirela ?ermure	Romania	55.56	55.13	52.35	56.22	56.22		3
7	Claudia Coslovich	Italy	53.80	50.72	51.18	x	53.80		2
8	Lorna Jackson	Great Britain	50.82	47.17	48.77	49.27	50.82		1
