= Athletics at the 1997 Summer Universiade – Women's 400 metres =

The women's 400 metres event at the 1997 Summer Universiade was held on 28, 29 and 30 August at the Stadio Cibali in Catania, Italy.

== Medalists ==
Gold	Silver	Bronze
Allison Curbishley; Great Britain	Olga Kotlyarova; Russia	Idalmis Bonne; Cuba

== Results ==
=== Heats ===
Rank	Heat	Athlete	Nationality	Time	Notes
1	3	Allison Curbishley	Great Britain	52.68	Q
2	1	Olga Kotlyarova	Russia	53.10	Q
2	2	Natalya Sharova	Russia	53.10	Q
4	3	Foy Williams	Canada	53.11	Q
5	2	Idalmis Bonne	Cuba	53.29	Q
6	4	Julia Duporty	Cuba	53.32	Q
7	1	Naděžda Koštovalová	Czech Republic	53.37	Q
8	3	Jessica Hudson	New Zealand	53.41	Q
9	4	Tatyana Movchan	Ukraine	53.46	Q
10	4	Michelle Pierre	Great Britain	53.87	Q
11	2	Carmo Tavares	Portugal	53.88	Q
12	3	Yana Manuylova	Ukraine	53.95	q
13	1	Žana Minina	Lithuania	54.17	Q
13	3	Jane Arnott	New Zealand	54.17	q
15	2	Andrea Pinnock	Canada	54.30	q
16	1	Yolanda Reyes	Spain	54.47	q
17	3	María Laura Almirão	Brazil	54.86	
18	4	Biljana Mitrović	Yugoslavia	55.15	
19	4	Nathalie Zamboni	Switzerland	56.02	
20	2	Chandra Burns	United States	56.45	
21	1	Charmaine Smit	Namibia	57.11	
22	2	Madeleine Ndongo	Cameroon	58.32	
23	1	Olivia Haddon	New Zealand	59.99	
24	1	Devota John	Tanzania	1:14.29	
25	3	Zannatun Nessa	Bangladesh	1:11.20	
	4	Evelina Nhassengo	Mozambique	DNF	
	?	Olabisi Afolabi	Nigeria	DNS	
	?	Anke Feller	Germany	DNS	

=== Semifinals ===
Rank	Heat	Athlete	Nationality	Time	Notes
1	2	Allison Curbishley	Great Britain	52.51	
2	1	Olga Kotlyarova	Russia	52.70	
3	2	Idalmis Bonne	Cuba	52.72	
4	1	Tatyana Movchan	Ukraine	53.16	
5	2	Natalya Sharova	Russia	53.17	
6	1	Naděžda Koštovalová	Czech Republic	53.18	
7	1	Julia Duporty	Cuba	53.29	
8	2	Foy Williams	Canada	53.60	
9	1	Michelle Pierre	Great Britain	53.53	
10	2	Jessica Hudson	New Zealand	53.68	
11	1	Carmo Tavares	Portugal	54.30	
12	2	Žana Minina	Lithuania	54.53	
13	2	Yana Manuylova	Ukraine	54.55	
14	2	Yolanda Reyes	Spain	54.63	
15	1	Andrea Pinnock	Canada	55.43	
16	1	Jane Arnott	New Zealand	56.10	

=== Final ===
Rank	Athlete	Nationality	Time	Notes
1st place, gold medalist(s)	Allison Curbishley	Great Britain	50.84	
2nd place, silver medalist(s)	Olga Kotlyarova	Russia	51.35	
3rd place, bronze medalist(s)	Idalmis Bonne	Cuba	51.72	
4	Naděžda Koštovalová	Czech Republic	52.32	
5	Tatyana Movchan	Ukraine	52.97	
6	Foy Williams	Canada	53.13	
7	Natalya Sharova	Russia	53.52	
	Julia Duporty	Cuba	DNS	
