= Athletics at the 2001 Summer Universiade – Women's 400 metres =

The women's 400 metres event at the 2001 Summer Universiade was held at the Workers Stadium in Beijing, China. The final took place on 28 and 29 August.

== Medalists ==
Gold	Silver	Bronze
Demetria Washington; United States	Otilia Ruicu; Romania	Mikele Barber; United States

== Results ==
=== Heats ===
Held on 28 August

Rank	Heat	Athlete	Nationality	Time	Notes
1	1	Demetria Washington	United States	51.05	Q
2	1	Hanna Kazak	Belarus	51.87	Q
3	4	Mikele Barber	United States	52.53	Q
4	3	Žana Minina	Lithuania	52.60	Q
5	1	Tayana Levina	Russia	52.81	Q
6	4	Lee McConnell	Great Britain	52.99	Q
7	1	Maria Laura Almirão	Brazil	53.01	Q
8	3	Lesley Owusu	Great Britain	53.02	Q
9	4	Natalya Khrushcheleva	Russia	53.16	Q
10	1	Rebecca Wardell	New Zealand	53.34	q
11	2	Otilia Ruicu	Romania	53.35	Q
12	2	Allison Beckford	Jamaica	53.44	Q
13	4	Chen Yuxiang	China	53.86	q
14	4	Mary Apio	Uganda	54.63	q
15	4	Carole Kaboud Mebam	Cameroon	54.71	
16	1	Lotte Visschers	Netherlands	55.32	
17	3	Bu Fanfang	China	55.79	Q
18	4	Oksana Luneva	Kyrgyzstan	55.93	
19	2	Krissy Liphardt	Canada	56.03	Q
20	2	Anne Mooney	Papua New Guinea	56.35	
21	2	Nguyen Thi Thu Trang	Vietnam	57.47	
22	2	Vasiti Vatureba	Fiji	59.05	
23	4	Eleana Leung	Hong Kong	59.50	
24	1	Rossana Rodríguez	Guatemala	59.55	
25	3	Mst. Shoma	Bangladesh	1:00.18	
26	3	Evodie Lydie Saramandji	Central African Republic	1:00.32	
27	2	Miriam Illes	Suriname	1:15.11	

=== Semifinals ===
Held on 29 August

Rank	Heat	Athlete	Nationality	Time	Notes
1	2	Demetria Washington	United States	51.66	Q
2	2	Otilia Ruicu	Romania	51.94	Q
3	1	Mikele Barber	United States	51.97	Q
4	2	Lee McConnell	Great Britain	52.05	Q
5	1	Hanna Kazak	Belarus	52.07	Q
6	1	Žana Minina	Lithuania	52.12	Q
7	1	Natalya Khrushcheleva	Russia	52.31	Q
8	2	Maria Laura Almirão	Brazil	52.72	Q
9	2	Allison Beckford	Jamaica	52.91	
10	2	Tayana Levina	Russia	53.10	
11	1	Lesley Owusu	Great Britain	53.20	
12	1	Rebecca Wardell	New Zealand	53.20	
13	1	Chen Yuxiang	China	53.83	
14	1	Mary Apio	Uganda	54.57	
15	2	Bu Fanfang	China	55.09	
16	2	Krissy Liphardt	Canada	56.50	

=== Final ===
Held on 29 August

Rank	Athlete	Nationality	Time	Notes
1st place, gold medalist(s)	Demetria Washington	United States	51.22	
2nd place, silver medalist(s)	Otilia Ruicu	Romania	51.82	
3rd place, bronze medalist(s)	Mikele Barber	United States	51.92	
4	Hanna Kazak	Belarus	52.00	
5	Žana Minina	Lithuania	52.22	
6	Lee McConnell	Great Britain	52.44	
7	Natalya Khrushcheleva	Russia	52.54	
8	Maria Laura Almirão	Brazil	52.71	
