= 1998 European Athletics Championships – Women's 400 metres =

Women's 400 metres at the European Athletics Championships
- Venue: Népstadion
- Location: Budapest, Hungary
- Dates: 19, 20 and 21 August
- Winning time: 49.93 s

Medalists
gold medal	Grit Breuer	Germany
silver medal	Helena Fuchsová	Czech Republic
bronze medal	Olga Kotlyarova	Russia

The women's 400 metres at the 1998 European Athletics Championships was held at the Népstadion on 19, 20 and 21 August.

== Results ==
KEY:	q	Fastest non-qualifiers	Q	Qualified	NR	National record	PB	Personal best	SB	Seasonal best

=== Round 1 ===
Qualification: First 3 in each heat (Q) and the next 4 fastest (q) advance to the Semifinals.

Rank	Heat	Name	Nationality	Time	Notes
1	2	Grit Breuer	Germany	51.60	Q
2	4	Helena Fuchsová	Czech Republic	51.61	Q
3	3	Olga Kotlyarova	Russia	51.62	Q
4	2	Patrizia Spuri	Italy	51.82	Q
5	4	Allison Curbishley	Great Britain	52.05	Q
6	4	Karen Shinkins	Ireland	52.13	Q
7	3	Donna Fraser	Great Britain	52.20	Q
8	1	Uta Rohländer	Germany	52.37	Q
9	4	Olena Rurak	Ukraine	52.49	q
10	2	Jitka Burianová	Czech Republic	52.62	Q
11	2	Otilia Ruicu	Romania	52.66	q, PB
12	3	Annamaria Bori	Hungary	52.69	Q, PB
13	2	Yekaterina Kulikova	Russia	52.83	q
14	3	Lana Jekabsone	Latvia	52.84	q
15	4	Christina Panagou	Greece	52.89	
16	1	Irina Rosikhina	Russia	52.97	Q
17	1	Fabienne Ficher	France	53.05	Q
18	1	Mariana Florea	Romania	53.22	SB
19	2	Anna Kozak	Belarus	53.30	
20	1	Carmo Tavares	Portugal	53.32	
21	3	Alina Ripanu	Romania	53.35	
22	1	Virna De Angeli	Italy	53.42	
23	4	Barbara Petráhn	Hungary	53.43	
24	3	Francesca Carbone	Italy	53.72	
25	2	Kristina Perica	Croatia	53.93	
	1	Dijana Kojić	Bosnia and Herzegovina	DNF	
	3	Dora Kyriakou	Cyprus	DNF	

=== Semifinals ===
Qualification: First 4 in each heat (Q) advance to the Final.

Rank	Heat	Name	Nationality	Time	Notes
1	1	Grit Breuer	Germany	50.79	Q
2	2	Helena Fuchsová	Czech Republic	50.87	Q
3	2	Uta Rohländer	Germany	51.04	Q
4	2	Olga Kotlyarova	Russia	51.08	Q
5	1	Allison Curbishley	Great Britain	51.43	Q
6	1	Patrizia Spuri	Italy	51.74	Q, SB
7	2	Donna Fraser	Great Britain	52.05	Q
8	1	Olena Rurak	Ukraine	52.36	Q
9	1	Karen Shinkins	Ireland	52.40	
10	1	Jitka Burianová	Czech Republic	52.41	
11	1	Lana Jekabsone	Latvia	52.76	
12	2	Fabienne Ficher	France	52.95	
13	2	Annamaria Bori	Hungary	53.11	
14	2	Otilia Ruicu	Romania	53.17	
15	2	Yekaterina Kulikova	Russia	53.25	
16	1	Irina Rosikhina	Russia	53.62	

=== Final ===
Rank	Name	Nationality	Time	Notes
1st place, gold medalist(s)	Grit Breuer	Germany	49.93	
2nd place, silver medalist(s)	Helena Fuchsová	Czech Republic	50.21	PB
3rd place, bronze medalist(s)	Olga Kotlyarova	Russia	50.38	PB
4	Uta Rohländer	Germany	50.48	
5	Allison Curbishley	Great Britain	51.05	
6	Donna Fraser	Great Britain	51.54	
7	Olena Rurak	Ukraine	51.92	SB
8	Patrizia Spuri	Italy	51.94	
