= Athletics at the 1999 Summer Universiade – Women's 400 metres =

The women's 400 metres event at the 1999 Summer Universiade was held on 9, 10 and 12 July at the Estadio Son Moix in Palma de Mallorca, Spain.

== Medalists ==
| Gold | Silver | Bronze |
|---|---|---|
| Ionela Târlea; Romania | Mikele Barber; United States | Doris Jacob; Nigeria |

== Results ==
=== Heats ===
| Rank | Heat | Athlete | Nationality | Time | Notes |
|---|---|---|---|---|---|
| 1 | 4 | Otilia Ruicu | Romania | 52.69 | Q |
| 2 | 4 | Karen Shinkins | Ireland | 52.72 | Q |
| 3 | 1 | Ionela Târlea | Romania | 52.73 | Q |
| 4 | 4 | Yulanda Nelson | United States | 52.74 | Q |
| 5 | 1 | Doris Jacob | Nigeria | 53.01 | Q |
| 6 | 2 | Anna Tkach | Russia | 53.02 | Q |
| 7 | 4 | Carmo Tavares | Portugal | 53.18 | q |
| 8 | 3 | Mikele Barber | United States | 53.24 | Q |
| 9 | 3 | Natalya Khrushcheleva | Russia | 53.43 | Q |
| 10 | 1 | Kristina Perica | Croatia | 53.46 | Q |
| 11 | 2 | Olga Mishchenko | Ukraine | 53.62 | Q |
| 12 | 3 | Federica Selis | Italy | 53.78 | Q |
| 13 | 3 | Cecilia Eksteen | South Africa | 53.80 | q |
| 14 | 4 | Dawn Higgins | Great Britain | 54.06 | |
| 15 | 2 | Jane Arnott | New Zealand | 54.15 | Q |
| 16 | 4 | María Paz Maqueda | Spain | 54.23 | |
| 17 | 1 | Yudalis Díaz | Cuba | 54.35 | |
| 18 | 2 | Yolanda Reyes | Spain | 54.61 | |
| 19 | 1 | Oksana Luneva | Kyrgyzstan | 54.73 | |
| 20 | 4 | Sigvor Melve | Norway | 54.77 | |
| 21 | 3 | Alice Nwosu | Nigeria | 55.10 | |
| 22 | 3 | Ndeye Niang | Senegal | 55.78 | |
| 23 | 1 | Maritza Figueroa | Nicaragua | 55.94 | |
| 24 | 2 | Yolandi Neethling | South Africa | 56.35 | |
| 25 | 2 | Diala El Chab | Lebanon | 57.15 | |
| 26 | 1 | Therese Okang | Cameroon | 58.44 | |
| 27 | 2 | Helen Muga | Papua New Guinea | 58.48 | |
| 28 | 3 | Vickie Nakibuka | Uganda | 1:00.91 | |
| 29 | 4 | Rossana Rodríguez | Guatemala | 1:01.93 | |
| | 3 | Denia Barton | Costa Rica | DNS | |

=== Semifinals ===
| Rank | Heat | Athlete | Nationality | Time | Notes |
|---|---|---|---|---|---|
| 1 | 1 | Ionela Târlea | Romania | 51.05 | Q |
| 2 | 2 | Mikele Barber | United States | 51.57 | Q |
| 3 | 2 | Karen Shinkins | Ireland | 51.80 | Q, PB |
| 4 | 2 | Otilia Ruicu | Romania | 51.80 | Q |
| 5 | 1 | Doris Jacob | Nigeria | 51.99 | Q, PB |
| 6 | 1 | Yulanda Nelson | United States | 52.41 | Q |
| 7 | 2 | Carmo Tavares | Portugal | 52.45 | Q, PB |
| 8 | 1 | Anna Tkach | Russia | 52.48 | Q |
| 9 | 2 | Kristina Perica | Croatia | 52.58 | PB |
| 10 | 2 | Natalya Khrushcheleva | Russia | 52.78 | |
| 11 | 1 | Olga Mishchenko | Ukraine | 53.38 | |
| 12 | 1 | Cecilia Eksteen | South Africa | 53.49 | |
| 13 | 2 | Jane Arnott | New Zealand | 54.08 | |
| 14 | 1 | Federica Selis | Italy | 54.10 | |
| 15 | 1 | Dawn Higgins | Great Britain | 54.23 | SB |
| 16 | 2 | María Paz Maqueda | Spain | 54.62 | |

=== Final ===
| Rank | Athlete | Nationality | Time | Notes |
|---|---|---|---|---|
| 1st place, gold medalist(s) | Ionela Târlea | Romania | 49.88 | UR, NR |
| 2nd place, silver medalist(s) | Mikele Barber | United States | 51.03 | |
| 3rd place, bronze medalist(s) | Doris Jacob | Nigeria | 51.04 | |
| 4 | Karen Shinkins | Ireland | 51.07 | |
| 5 | Otilia Ruicu | Romania | 51.50 | |
| 6 | Carmo Tavares | Portugal | 51.92 | NR |
| 7 | Yulanda Nelson | United States | 51.98 | |
| 8 | Anna Tkach | Russia | 52.68 | |
