= 1999 World Championships in Athletics – Women's 400 metres =

These are the official results of the Women's 400 metres event at the 1999 IAAF World Championships in Seville, Spain. There were a total number of 52 participating athletes, with seven qualifying heats, four quarter-finals, two semi-finals and the final held on Thursday 26 August 1999 at 20:30h.

== Final ==
RANK	FINAL	TIME
	Cathy Freeman (AUS)	49.67
	Anja Rücker (GER)	49.74
	Lorraine Graham (JAM)	49.92
4.	Falilat Ogunkoya (NGR)	50.03
5.	Katharine Merry (GBR)	50.52
6.	Natalya Nazarova (RUS)	50.61
7.	Grit Breuer (GER)	50.67
8.	Olga Kotlyarova (RUS)	50.72

== Semi-final ==
- Held on Tuesday 24 August 1999

RANK	HEAT 1	TIME
1.	Falilat Ogunkoya (NGR)	49.96
2.	Lorraine Graham (JAM)	50.05
3.	Anja Rücker (GER)	50.09
4.	Natalya Nazarova (RUS)	50.48
5.	Michelle Collins (USA)	50.67
6.	Ana Guevara (MEX)	50.70
7.	Helena Fuchsová (CZE)	50.84
8.	Suziann Reid (USA)	50.90

RANK	HEAT 2	TIME
1.	Cathy Freeman (AUS)	49.76
2.	Grit Breuer (GER)	50.16
3.	Katharine Merry (GBR)	50.21
4.	Olga Kotlyarova (RUS)	50.32
5.	Olabisi Afolabi (NGR)	50.40
6.	Charity Opara (NGR)	50.52
7.	Amy Mbacké Thiam (SEN)	50.77
8.	Maicel Malone-Wallace (USA)	50.93

== Quarter-finals ==
- Held on Monday 23 August 1999

RANK	HEAT 1	TIME
1.	Charity Opara (NGR)	50.82
2.	Katharine Merry (GBR)	50.86
3.	Helena Fuchsová (CZE)	51.18
4.	Suziann Reid (USA)	51.19
5.	Claudine Williams (JAM)	51.40
6.	Otilia Ruicu (ROM)	51.86
7.	Mireille Ngiumgo (CMR)	51.98
8.	Foy Williams (CAN)	54.34

RANK	HEAT 2	TIME
1.	Anja Rücker (GER)	50.62
2.	Michelle Collins (USA)	50.75
3.	Lorraine Graham (JAM)	51.02
4.	Olga Kotlyarova (RUS)	51.21
5.	Claudine Komgang (CMR)	51.73
6.	Susan Andrews (AUS)	52.05
7.	Karen Shinkins (IRL)	52.08
8.	Chen Yuxiang (CHN)	52.93

RANK	HEAT 3	TIME
1.	Grit Breuer (GER)	50.41
2.	Olabisi Afolabi (NGR)	50.47
3.	Cathy Freeman (AUS)	50.49
4.	Ana Guevara (MEX)	51.08
5.	Francine Landre (FRA)	52.07
6.	Nadjina Kaltouma (CHA)	52.47
7.	Virna de Angeli (ITA)	52.78
8.	Maria do Carmo Tavares (POR)	52.86

RANK	HEAT 4	TIME
1.	Falilat Ogunkoya (NGR)	50.59
2.	Natalya Nazarova (RUS)	50.77
3.	Maicel Malone-Wallace (USA)	50.82
4.	Amy Mbacké Thiam (SEN)	51.05
5.	Uta Rohländer (GER)	51.45
6.	Donna Fraser (GBR)	52.01
7.	Jitka Burianová (CZE)	52.52
8.	Damayanthi Darsha-Kobalavithanage (SRI)	53.33

== Heats ==
- Held on Tuesday 24 August 1999

RANK	HEAT 1	TIME
1.	Grit Breuer (GER)	51.13
2.	Michelle Collins (USA)	51.14
3.	Ana Guevara (MEX)	51.23
4.	Virna de Angeli (ITA)	52.60
5.	Leanie van der Walt (RSA)	53.53
6.	Zoila Stewart (CRC)	54.55
7.	Yelena Piskunova (UZB)	55.44

RANK	HEAT 2	TIME
1.	Maicel Malone-Wallace (USA)	51.13
2.	Lorraine Graham (JAM)	51.32
3.	Uta Rohländer (GER)	51.87
4.	Francine Landre (FRA)	52.07
5.	Tonique Williams (BAH)	52.95
6.	Svetlana Bodritskaya (KAZ)	53.74
7.	Ann Mooney (PNG)	57.30

RANK	HEAT 3	TIME
1.	Charity Opara (NGR)	51.42
2.	Natalya Nazarova (RUS)	52.25
3.	Jitka Burianová (CZE)	52.49
4.	Damayanthi Darsha-Kobalavithanage (SRI)	52.68
5.	Tracey Barnes (JAM)	53.41
6.	Kristina Perica (CRO)	53.52
7.	Diala Al Chabi (LIB)	57.22
8.	Donata Mutegwamaso (RWA)	1:00.04

RANK	HEAT 4	TIME
1.	Falilat Ogunkoya (NGR)	51.43
2.	Amy Mbacké Thiam (SEN)	51.59
3.	Claudine Komgang (CMR)	51.68
4.	Karen Shinkins (IRL)	52.12
5.	Maria do Carmo Tavares (POR)	52.74
6.	Louise Ayetotche (CIV)	55.44
7.	Hazel-Ann Regis (GRN)	57.64

RANK	HEAT 5	TIME
1.	Katharine Merry (GBR)	51.48
2.	Helena Fuchsová (CZE)	51.71
3.	Nadjina Kaltouma (CHA)	51.90
4.	Susan Andrews (AUS)	51.99
5.	Otilia Ruicu (ROM)	52.04
6.	Chen Yuxiang (CHN)	52.76
7.	Maritza Figueroa (NCA)	57.64
	Ony Paule Ratsimbazafy (MAD)	DNS

RANK	HEAT 6	TIME
1.	Cathy Freeman (AUS)	51.49
2.	Olabisi Afolabi (NGR)	51.50
3.	Olga Kotlyarova (RUS)	51.70
4.	Mireille Ngiumgo (CMR)	51.89
5.	Donna Fraser (GBR)	52.38
6.	Lisette Ferri (ESP)	54.50
7.	Dijana Kojić (BIH)	56.08

RANK	HEAT 7	TIME
1.	Anja Rücker (GER)	51.09
2.	Suziann Reid (USA)	51.94
3.	Claudine Williams (JAM)	52.01
4.	Foy Williams (CAN)	53.07
5.	Grace Dinkins (LBR)	53.25
6.	Melissa Straker (BAR)	53.97
	Ahamada Haoulata (COM)	DQ
	Lee Naylor (AUS)	DQ
