= Yekaterina Bakhvalova =

Russian hurdler (born 1972)

Personal information
- Born: 8 March 1972 (age 54) Leningrad, Soviet Union

Sport
- Sport: Track and field
Medal record
Representing Russia
World Championships
Gold medal – first place	1999 Seville	4x400 m relay
World Indoor Championships
Gold medal – first place	1997 Paris	4x400 m relay
European Championships
Silver medal – second place	1998 Budapest	4×400 m relay
Summer Universiade
Gold medal – first place	1997 Catania	4x400 m relay
Silver medal – second place	1997 Catania	400 m hurdles

Yekaterina Aleksandrovna Bakhvalova (Russian: Екатерина Александровна Бахвалова; born 8 March 1972) is a retired Russian athlete who specialised in the 400 metres hurdles. She represented her country at the 2004 Summer Olympics narrowly missing the final.

Her personal best in the event is 54.65 seconds, set in 1999.

== International competitions ==
Representing Russia
Year	Competition	Venue	Position	Event	Notes
1997	World Indoor Championships	Paris, France	1st (h)	4 × 400 m relay	3:29.85
1997	World Championships	Athens, Greece	10th (sf)	400 m hurdles	55.02
1997	Universiade	Catania, Italy	2nd	400 m hurdles	55.91
1997	Universiade	Catania, Italy	1st	4 × 400 m relay	3:27.93
1998	Goodwill Games	Uniondale, United States	6th	400 m hurdles	55.69
1998	Goodwill Games	Uniondale, United States	3rd	4 × 400 m relay	3:25.58
1998	European Championships	Budapest, Hungary	9th (h)	400 m hurdles	55.69
1998	European Championships	Budapest, Hungary	2nd	4 × 400 m relay	3:23.56
1999	World Championships	Seville, Spain	15th (sf)	400 m hurdles	55.76
1999	World Championships	Seville, Spain	1st (h)	4 × 400 m relay	3:24.51
2002	European Championships	Munich, Germany	5th	400 m hurdles	56.39
2002	European Championships	Munich, Germany	3rd (h)	4 × 400 m relay	3:30.94
2004	Olympic Games	Athens, Greece	9th (sf)	400 m hurdles	54.98

== See also ==
- List of World Athletics Championships medalists (women)
- List of European Athletics Championships medalists (women)
- 4 × 400 metres relay at the World Championships in Athletics
