= 1999 European Athletics U23 Championships – Women's 400 metres =

The women's 400 metres event at the 1999 European Athletics U23 Championships was held in Gothenburg, Sweden, at Ullevi on 29 and 31 July 1999.

== Medalists ==
Gold	Otilia Ruicu; Romania
Silver	Jitka Burianová; Czech Republic
Bronze	Grażyna Prokopek; Poland

== Results ==
=== Final ===
31 July

Rank	Name	Nationality	Time	Notes
1st place, gold medalist(s)	Otilia Ruicu	Romania	51.93	
2nd place, silver medalist(s)	Jitka Burianová	Czech Republic	52.01	
3rd place, bronze medalist(s)	Grażyna Prokopek	Poland	52.28	
4	Claudia Marx	Germany	52.46	
5	Andrea Burlacu	Romania	52.53	
6	Kristina Perica	Croatia	53.00	
7	Nicole Marahrens	Germany	53.20	
8	Tsvetelina Kirilova	Bulgaria	53.26	

=== Heats ===
29 July
Qualified: first 2 in each heat and 2 best to the Final

==== Heat 1 ====
Rank	Name	Nationality	Time	Notes
1	Nicole Marahrens	Germany	52.77	Q
2	Tsvetelina Kirilova	Bulgaria	52.97	Q
3	Zana Minina	Lithuania	53.59	
4	Svetlana Pospelova	Russia	54.05	
5	Barbara Petráhn	Hungary	54.12	
6	Katiana René	France	54.25	
7	Ramona Popovici	Romania	54.64	
7	Louretta Thorne	United Kingdom	54.64	

==== Heat 2 ====
Rank	Name	Nationality	Time	Notes
1	Otilia Ruicu	Romania	52.61	Q
2	Grażyna Prokopek	Poland	53.12	Q
3	Kristina Perica	Croatia	53.52	q
4	Lotte Visschers	Netherlands	53.68	
5	Martina Morawska	Czech Republic	54.20	
6	Carey Easton	United Kingdom	54.95	
7	Sylvanie Morandais	France	55.10	
8	Biljana Mitrović	Yugoslavia	DQ	

==== Heat 3 ====
Rank	Name	Nationality	Time	Notes
1	Andrea Burlacu	Romania	52.73	Q
2	Claudia Marx	Germany	52.78	Q
3	Jitka Burianová	Czech Republic	53.03	q
4	Marina Grishakova	Russia	53.97	
5	Lesley Owusu	United Kingdom	55.00	
6	Jovana Miljković	Yugoslavia	55.36	
7	Dado Kamissoko	France	55.77	
8	Fiona Nonwood	Ireland	57.09	

== Participation ==
According to an unofficial count, 24 athletes from 14 countries participated in the event.

- Bulgaria (1)
- Croatia (1)
- Czech Republic (2)
- France (3)
- Germany (2)
- Hungary (1)
- Ireland (1)
- Lithuania (1)
- Netherlands (1)
- Poland (1)
- Romania (3)
- Russia (2)
- United Kingdom (3)
- Yugoslavia (2)
