= Athletics at the 1997 Summer Universiade – Women's 4 × 400 metres relay =

The women's 4 × 400 metres relay event at the 1997 Summer Universiade was held on 30 and 31 August at the Stadio Cibali in Catania, Italy.

== Results ==
=== Heats ===
Rank	Heat	Nation	Athletes	Time	Notes
1	1	United States	Saidah Jones, Donna Arnett, Chandra Burns, Darlene Malco	3:34.70	Q
2	1	Russia	Natalya Shevtsova, Mariya Sinusova, Svetlana Goncharenko, Natalya Sharova	3:37.23	Q
3	1	Italy	Francesca Cola, Monika Niederstätter, Elisabetta Artuso, Lara Rocco	3:39.25	Q
4	1	Switzerland	Mireille Donders, Michèle Schenk, Nathalie Zamboni, Martina Stoop	3:41.45	
5	1	Brazil	Andrea da Silva, Maria Laura Almirão, Lorena de Oliveira, Célia dos Santos	3:43.05	
1	2	Cuba	Nancy McLeón, Julia Duporty, Daimí Pernía, Idalmis Bonne	3:33.73	Q
2	2	Canada	Karen Clarke, Foy Williams, Andrea Pinnock, LaDonna Antoine	3:33.74	Q
3	2	Germany	Ulrike Ahlborn, Karla Faulhaber, Mona Steigauf, Anke Feller	3:34.03	Q
4	2	Great Britain	Jeina Mitchell, Michelle Thomas, Vicki Jamison, Michelle Pierre	3:33.83	q
5	2	Mexico	Sandra Romo, Jeannette Castro, Marcela Sarabia, Ana Guevara	3:38.26	q
6	2	New Zealand	Olivia Haddon, Anna Smythe, Jane Arnott, Nicola Kidd-de Jong	3:43.35	

=== Final ===
Rank	Nation	Athletes	Time	Notes
1st place, gold medalist(s)	Russia	Natalya Sharova, Svetlana Goncharenko, Yekaterina Bakhvalova, Olga Kotlyarova	3:27.93	
2nd place, silver medalist(s)	Cuba	Nancy McLeón, Julia Duporty, Daimí Pernía, Idalmis Bonne	3:29.00	
3rd place, bronze medalist(s)	Great Britain	Vicki Jamison, Michelle Pierre, Michelle Thomas, Allison Curbishley	3:30.57	
4	Canada	Karen Clarke, LaDonna Antoine, Foy Williams, Andrea Pinnock	3:31.94	
5	United States	Donna Arnett, Chandra Burns, Saidah Jones, Darlene Malco	3:32.58	
6	Germany	Anke Feller, Shanta Ghosh, Ulrike Ahlborn, Karla Faulhaber	3:32.72	
7	Mexico	Marcela Sarabia, Ana Guevara, Sandra Romo, Jeannette Castro	3:34.63	
8	Italy	Francesca Cola, Elisabetta Artuso, Monika Niederstätter, Lara Rocco	3:39.47	
