= 1997 World Championships in Athletics – Women's 400 metres =

These are the results of the Women's 400 metres event at the 1997 World Championships in Athletics in Athens, Greece.

== Medalists ==
Gold	Cathy Freeman; Australia (AUS)
Silver	Sandie Richards; Jamaica (JAM)
Bronze	Jearl Miles Clark; United States (USA)

== Results ==
=== Heats ===
First 4 of each Heat (Q) and the next 4 fastest (q) qualified for the quarterfinals.

Rank	Heat	Name	Nationality	Time	Notes
1	1	Helena Dziurova-Fuchsová	Czech Republic	51.05	Q, PB
2	4	Grit Breuer	Germany	51.43	Q
3	5	Lorraine Graham	Jamaica	51.45	Q
4	5	Cathy Freeman	Australia	51.53	Q
5	4	Olga Kotlyarova	Russia	51.55	Q
6	2	Sandie Richards	Jamaica	51.57	Q
6	5	Maicel Malone-Wallace	United States	51.57	Q
8	1	Tatyana Alekseyeva	Russia	51.61	Q
8	5	Pauline Davis-Thompson	Bahamas	51.61	Q
10	2	Jearl Miles Clark	United States	51.77	Q
10	4	Falilat Ogunkoya	Nigeria	51.77	Q
12	5	Anja Rucker	Germany	51.84	q
13	3	Kim Graham	United States	51.92	Q
14	2	Allison Curbishley	Great Britain	51.97	Q
15	1	Damayanthi Dharsha	Sri Lanka	51.99	Q, NR
16	1	Olabisi Afolabi	Nigeria	52.13	Q
17	4	Naděžda Koštovalová	Czech Republic	52.15	Q
18	2	Norfalia Carabalí	Colombia	52.18	Q
19	3	Donna Fraser	Great Britain	52.21	Q
20	1	Tonique Williams	Bahamas	52.30	q
21	1	Ladonna Antoine	Canada	52.44	q
22	4	Adri de Jongh	South Africa	52.47	q
23	3	Patrizia Spuri	Italy	52.54	Q
24	3	Tatyana Chebykina	Russia	52.57	Q
25	2	Hana Benešová	Czech Republic	52.74	
26	5	Marina Filipović	Yugoslavia	53.16	
27	5	Svetlana Bodritskaya	Kazakhstan	53.28	
28	3	Inez Turner	Jamaica	53.34	
29	2	Mayra González	Mexico	53.63	
30	1	Maria Figueiredo	Brazil	53.95	
31	4	Zoila Stewart	Costa Rica	54.03	
32	3	Christina Panagou	Greece	54.23	
33	2	Nadjina Kaltouma	Chad	54.49	
34	4	Dijana Kojić	Bosnia and Herzegovina	55.06	PB
35	3	Grace Dinkins	Liberia	55.19	
36	2	Cathalina Staye	Saint Lucia	55.54	NR
37	1	Charmaine Smit	Namibia	55.67	
38	4	Olga Conte	Argentina	55.82	
	3	Charity Opara	Nigeria	DNS	

=== Quarterfinals ===
First 4 of each Heat (Q) and the next 4 fastest (q) qualified for the semifinals.

Rank	Heat	Name	Nationality	Time	Notes
1	1	Sandie Richards	Jamaica	50.08	Q, PB
2	1	Helena Dziurova-Fuchsová	Czech Republic	50.36	Q, PB
3	2	Falilat Ogunkoya	Nigeria	50.39	Q
4	1	Pauline Davis-Thompson	Bahamas	50.53	Q, SB
5	1	Olga Kotlyarova	Russia	50.63	Q, PB
6	2	Grit Breuer	Germany	50.65	Q
7	3	Jearl Miles Clark	United States	50.66	Q
8	3	Cathy Freeman	Australia	50.75	Q
9	1	Maicel Malone-Wallace	United States	50.77	q
10	1	Allison Curbishley	Great Britain	50.78	q
11	2	Tatyana Alekseyeva	Russia	50.90	Q
12	3	Lorraine Graham	Jamaica	51.03	Q
13	3	Olabisi Afolabi	Nigeria	51.07	Q
14	3	Donna Fraser	Great Britain	51.11	q, PB
15	1	Anja Rucker	Germany	51.36	q, SB
16	3	Norfalia Carabalí	Colombia	51.42	SB
17	3	Tatyana Chebykina	Russia	51.57	
18	2	Kim Graham	United States	51.72	Q
19	3	Patrizia Spuri	Italy	52.15	SB
20	2	Ladonna Antoine	Canada	52.37	
21	2	Naděžda Koštovalová	Czech Republic	52.61	
22	2	Damayanthi Darsha	Sri Lanka	53.49	
23	2	Tonique Williams	Bahamas	54.23	
	1	Adri de Jongh	South Africa	DNF	

=== Semifinals ===
First 4 of each Semifinal qualified directly (Q) for the final.

Rank	Heat	Name	Nationality	Time	Notes
1	1	Jearl Miles Clark	United States	50.05	Q
2	1	Falilat Ogunkoya	Nigeria	50.06	Q
3	1	Cathy Freeman	Australia	50.11	Q
4	2	Sandie Richards	Jamaica	50.21	Q
5	2	Grit Breuer	Germany	50.33	Q, SB
6	2	Helena Dziurova-Fuchsová	Czech Republic	50.69	Q
7	1	Pauline Davis-Thompson	Bahamas	50.77	Q
8	1	Lorraine Graham	Jamaica	50.90	
9	2	Tatyana Alekseyeva	Russia	50.98	Q
10	1	Olga Kotlyarova	Russia	51.03	
11	2	Maicel Malone-Wallace	United States	51.40	
12	2	Allison Curbishley	Great Britain	51.42	
13	2	Olabisi Afolabi	Nigeria	51.44	
14	2	Kim Graham	United States	51.54	
15	1	Anja Rucker	Germany	51.94	
	1	Donna Fraser	Great Britain	DNS	

=== Final ===
Rank	Lane	Name	Nationality	Time	Notes
1st place, gold medalist(s)	1	Cathy Freeman	Australia	49.77	
2nd place, silver medalist(s)	5	Sandie Richards	Jamaica	49.79	PB
3rd place, bronze medalist(s)	4	Jearl Miles Clark	United States	49.90	
4	6	Grit Breuer	Germany	50.06	SB
5	3	Falilat Ogunkoya	Nigeria	50.27	
6	8	Helena Dziurova-Fuchsová	Czech Republic	50.66	
7	7	Pauline Davis-Thompson	Bahamas	50.68	
8	2	Tatyana Alekseyeva	Russia	51.37	
