= 1994 World Junior Championships in Athletics – Women's 400 metres =

1994 Athletic World Junior Championship

The women's 400 metres event at the 1994 World Junior Championships in Athletics was held in Lisbon, Portugal, at Estádio Universitário de Lisboa on 20, 21 and 22 July.

== Medalists ==
Gold	Olabisi Afolabi; Nigeria
Silver	Monique Hennagan; United States
Bronze	Hana Benešová; Czech Republic

== Results ==
=== Final ===
22 July

Rank	Name	Nationality	Time	Notes
1st place, gold medalist(s)	Olabisi Afolabi	Nigeria	51.97	
2nd place, silver medalist(s)	Monique Hennagan	United States	52.25	
3rd place, bronze medalist(s)	Hana Benešová	Czech Republic	52.60	
4	Li Yajun	China	52.62	
5	Tracey Barnes	Jamaica	53.46	
6	Tamsyn Lewis	Australia	53.51	
7	Cicely Scott	United States	53.57	
	Claudine Williams	Jamaica	DNF	

=== Semifinals ===
21 July

==== Semifinal 1 ====
Rank	Name	Nationality	Time	Notes
1	Claudine Williams	Jamaica	52.43	Q
2	Li Yajun	China	52.99	Q
3	Hana Benešová	Czech Republic	53.48	Q
4	Cicely Scott	United States	53.65	Q
5	Žana Minina	Lithuania	53.81	
6	Florence Ekpo-Umoh	Nigeria	53.84	
7	Heidi Suomi	Finland	54.49	
8	Sandrine Thiébaud	France	55.73	

==== Semifinal 2 ====
Rank	Name	Nationality	Time	Notes
1	Olabisi Afolabi	Nigeria	52.27	Q
2	Monique Hennagan	United States	52.74	Q
3	Tamsyn Lewis	Australia	53.91	Q
4	Tracey Barnes	Jamaica	53.92	Q
5	Daimí Pernía	Cuba	54.09	
6	Larisa Bolenok	Russia	54.85	
7	Claudia Angerhausen	Germany	55.02	
8	Zhang Yu	China	55.54	

=== Heats ===
20 July

==== Heat 1 ====
Rank	Name	Nationality	Time	Notes
1	Olabisi Afolabi	Nigeria	53.60	Q
2	Cicely Scott	United States	54.63	Q
3	Žana Minina	Lithuania	54.88	Q
4	Vernetta Rolle	Bahamas	55.12	
5	Melissa Straker	Barbados	55.76	
6	Kaltouma Nadjina	Chad	56.08	
7	Militza Castro	Puerto Rico	56.16	
8	Natalya Dorokhina	Kazakhstan	57.78	

==== Heat 2 ====
Rank	Name	Nationality	Time	Notes
1	Claudine Williams	Jamaica	53.82	Q
2	Florence Ekpo-Umoh	Nigeria	54.69	Q
3	Claudia Angerhausen	Germany	54.71	Q
4	Zhang Yu	China	54.81	q
5	Yolande Venter	South Africa	54.93	
6	Barbora Dostálová	Czech Republic	55.88	
7	Valentina Golovko	Russia	55.97	

==== Heat 3 ====
Rank	Name	Nationality	Time	Notes
1	Li Yajun	China	53.38	Q
2	Hana Benešová	Czech Republic	53.89	Q
3	Tamsyn Lewis	Australia	54.42	Q
4	Louretta Thorne	United Kingdom	55.06	
5	Lidurka Torres	Cuba	55.37	
6	Onica Fraser	Guyana	55.82	
	Tonique Williams	Bahamas	DQ	

==== Heat 4 ====
Rank	Name	Nationality	Time	Notes
1	Monique Hennagan	United States	53.50	Q
2	Tracey Barnes	Jamaica	53.92	Q
3	Daimí Pernía	Cuba	54.17	Q
4	Heidi Suomi	Finland	54.36	q
5	Larisa Bolenok	Russia	54.77	q
6	Sandrine Thiébaud	France	54.91	q
7	Andrea Burlacu	Romania	55.30	
8	Tacko Diouf	Senegal	59.02	

== Participation ==
According to an unofficial count, 30 athletes from 22 countries participated in the event.

- Australia (1)
- Bahamas (2)
- Barbados (1)
- Chad (1)
- China (2)
- Cuba (2)
- Czech Republic (2)
- Finland (1)
- France (1)
- Germany (1)
- Guyana (1)
- Jamaica (2)
- Kazakhstan (1)
- Lithuania (1)
- Nigeria (2)
- Puerto Rico (1)
- Romania (1)
- Russia (2)
- Senegal (1)
- South Africa (1)
- United Kingdom (1)
- United States (2)
