= 1996 World Junior Championships in Athletics – Women's 400 metres =

The women's 400 metres event at the 1996 World Junior Championships in Athletics was held in Sydney, Australia, at International Athletic Centre on 21, 22 and 23 August.

== Medalists ==
Gold	Andrea Burlacu; Romania
Silver	Suziann Reid; United States
Bronze	Rosemary Hayward; Australia

== Results ==
=== Final ===
23 August

Rank	Name	Nationality	Time	Notes
1st place, gold medalist(s)	Andrea Burlacu	Romania	52.32	
2nd place, silver medalist(s)	Suziann Reid	United States	53.17	
3rd place, bronze medalist(s)	Rosemary Hayward	Australia	53.28	
4	Yuliya Taranova	Russia	53.43	
5	Cindy Ega	France	53.45	
6	Otilia Ruicu	Romania	53.87	
7	Doreen Harstick	Germany	54.46	
8	Li Jing	China	54.61	

=== Semifinals ===
22 August

==== Semifinal 1 ====
Rank	Name	Nationality	Time	Notes
1	Andrea Burlacu	Romania	53.05	Q
2	Suziann Reid	United States	53.11	Q
3	Doreen Harstick	Germany	53.86	Q
4	Yuliya Taranova	Russia	53.95	Q
5	Tamsyn Lewis	Australia	54.55	
6	Justine Bayiga	Uganda	55.07	
7	Ana Guevara	Mexico	55.24	
8	Žana Minina	Lithuania	56.30	

==== Semifinal 2 ====
Rank	Name	Nationality	Time	Notes
1	Rosemary Hayward	Australia	53.60	Q
2	Li Jing	China	53.70	Q
3	Otilia Ruicu	Romania	53.89	Q
4	Cindy Ega	France	53.98	Q
5	Jitka Burianová	Czech Republic	54.52	
6	Barbara Petráhn	Hungary	55.38	
7	Yekaterina Solovyova	Russia	55.79	
	Malika Edmonson	United States	DNS	

=== Heats ===
21 August

==== Heat 1 ====
Rank	Name	Nationality	Time	Notes
1	Doreen Harstick	Germany	54.09	Q
2	Otilia Ruicu	Romania	54.14	Q
3	Li Jing	China	54.56	Q
4	Žana Minina	Lithuania	55.64	q
5	Yekaterina Solovyova	Russia	56.40	q
6	Gabriella Edwards	Trinidad and Tobago	59.30	
7	Dijana Kojic	Bosnia and Herzegovina	60.04	

==== Heat 2 ====
Rank	Name	Nationality	Time	Notes
1	Suziann Reid	United States	53.88	Q
2	Tamsyn Lewis	Australia	54.39	Q
3	Justine Bayiga	Uganda	54.94	Q
4	Jarita Dill	Bermuda	57.37	
5	Wang Xuemei	China	58.11	
6	Sherlene Williams	Barbados	59.09	

==== Heat 3 ====
Rank	Name	Nationality	Time	Notes
1	Cindy Ega	France	53.98	Q
2	Andrea Burlacu	Romania	54.04	Q
3	Yuliya Taranova	Russia	54.34	Q
4	Ana Guevara	Mexico	56.54	q
5	Anastasía Thomatdou	Greece	59.00	

==== Heat 4 ====
Rank	Name	Nationality	Time	Notes
1	Rosemary Hayward	Australia	54.00	Q
2	Barbara Petráhn	Hungary	54.71	Q
3	Jitka Burianová	Czech Republic	54.83	Q
4	Malika Edmonson	United States	55.89	q
5	Karina Soto	Uruguay	56.91	
6	Erum Khanum	Pakistan	59.14	

== Participation ==
According to an unofficial count, 24 athletes from 19 countries participated in the event.

- Australia (2)
- Barbados (1)
- Bermuda (1)
- Bosnia and Herzegovina (1)
- China (2)
- Czech Republic (1)
- France (1)
- Germany (1)
- Greece (1)
- Hungary (1)
- Lithuania (1)
- Mexico (1)
- Pakistan (1)
- Romania (2)
- Russia (2)
- Trinidad and Tobago (1)
- Uganda (1)
- United States (2)
- Uruguay (1)
