= 2001 Lithuanian Athletics Championships =

- Edition: 78th
- Dates: 3–4 July
- Host city: Kaunas, Lithuania
- Level: Senior
- Type: Outdoor

The 2001 Lithuanian Athletics Championships were held at the S. Darius and S. Girėnas Stadium in Kaunas from July 3 to July 4, 2001.

== Men ==
Event	1st place		2nd place		3rd place	
100 m	Sigitas Kavaliauskas	10,96	Donatas Jakševičius	10,96	Eugenijus Liubenka	11,02
200 m	Vytautas Kancleris	21,56	Eugenijus Liubenka	21,72	Stanislav Michno	21,82
400 m	Raimondas Turla	48,15	Stanislav Michno	48,27	Nerijus Janutis	48,56
800 m	Evaldas Martinka	1:50.26	Dainius Kižys	1:51.89	Paulius Jakubauskas	1:52.26
1 500 m	Evaldas Martinka	3:49.39	Dainius Kižys	3:54.23	Darius Gruzdys	3:55.85
5 000 m	Dainius Šaučikovas	14:54.01	Egidijus Rupšys	14:55.76	Arūnas Balčiūnas	15:06.53
4 × 100 m	Kaunas's team Donatas Jakševičius; Sigitas Kavaliauskas; Vaidas Augustaitis; Dainius Šerytis	41,90	Vilnius's team Marijus Gendrinas; Aleksandr Barinov; Valentin Linik; Eugenijus Liubenka	42,17	Klaipėda's team Denis Jevdokimov; Donatas Rauktys; Tadas Šilauskas; Ilja Andrusenko	42,46
4 × 400 m	Kaunas's team Dainius Ratautas; Mindaugas Butkus; Ridas Karaška; Nerijus Janutis	3:17.51	Klaipėda's team Gediminas Butenis; Viktoras Mauricas; Valdemaras Ežerskis; Žydrūnas Mažrimas	3:18.53	Vilnius's team Jaroslav Liachovskij; Vitalij Gorlukovič; Rimas Ališauskas; Paulius Jokubauskas	3:24.86
110 m hurdles	Vytautas Kancleris	14,33	Rolandas Stanionis	15,22	Not awarded	
400 m hurdles	Tomas Ališauskas	55,53	Ridas Karaška	55,71	Dainius Ratautas	56,19
3 000 m steeplechase	Mindaugas Pukštas	8:43.40	Mindaugas Tomanas	9:15.65	Linas Šalkauskas	9:24.47
Triple Jump	Audrius Raizgys	16,08	Ardydas Nazarovas	15,86	Arinijus Veiknys	15,35
Long Jump	Arinijus Veiknys	7,75	Valentin Linik	7,62	Marijus Gendrėnas	7,55
High Jump	Aurelijus Eirošius	2,17	Deividas Rinkevičius	2,08	Mantas Šaulys	2,00
Pole Vault	Regimantas Kičas	4,30	Algis Simutis	4,20	Darius Draudvila	4,10
Shot Put	Saulius Kleiza	18,67	Gintautas Degutis	18,51	Tomas Keinys	17,03
Hammer Throw	Edgaras Brinkis	60,47	Žydrūnas Vasiliauskas	59,86	Dalius Čižauskas	53,20
Discus Throw	Virgilijus Alekna	68,20	Romas Ubartas	60,78	Andrius Butrimas	49,05
Javelin Throw	Tomas Intas	78,12	Arūnas Jurkšas	75,66	Ričardas Keršulis	65,84

== Women ==
Event	1st place		2nd place		3rd place	
100 m	Audra Dagelytė	11,67	Edita Lingytė	11,89	Svetlana Charisova	11,96
200 m	Žana Minina	24,08	Edita Lingytė	24,21	Svetlana Charisova	24,63
400 m	Žana Minina	53,94	Jūratė Kudirkaitė	56,54	Laura Balsytė	57,39
800 m	Irina Krakoviak	2:04.33	Vida Bytautienė	2:05.08	Inesa Kliukoitytė	2:09.65
1 500 m	Irina Krakoviak	4:12.56	Rasa Drazdauskaitė	4:12.80	Diana Maciušonytė	4:33.82
5 000 m	Inga Juodeškienė	15:57.93	Živilė Balčiūnaitė	16:27.39	Inga Januševičienė	18:00.29
4 × 100 m	Kaunas's team Adrija Grocienė; Diana Radavičienė; Edita Lingytė; Svetlna Charisova	47,10	Naujoji Akmenė's team Sigita Sagaidokaitė; Inesa Rimkevičiūtė; Marina Sugak; Audra Dagelytė	48,87	Vilnius's team Akvilė Buitkutė; Jolanta Kirejeva; Šarūnė Baltrūnaitė; Jurgita Urbaitė	49,16
4 × 400 m	Vilnius's team Šarūnė Baltrūnaitė; Olga Ziuganova; Nadežda Žolobova; Žana Minina	3:50.13	Šiauliai's team Laura Balsytė; Indrė Vrubliauskaitė; Rasa Drazdauskaitė; Danguolė Razmaitė	3:53.09	Kaunas's team Aurelija Venskaitytė; Jūratė Kudirkaitė; Kristina Česonytė; Rūta Vilkaitė	3:55.63
100 m hurdles	Diana Radavičienė	14,55	Viktorija Žemaitytė	15,08	Enrika Baliutavičiūtė	15,97
400 m hurdles	Inesa Kliukoitytė	1:01.71	Diana Radavičienė	1:03.31	Aurelija Venskaitytė	1:04.03
2 000 m steeplechase	Sandra Stanevičiūtė	7:22.54	Not Awarded		Not Awarded	
Triple Jump	Živilė Žebarauskaitė	13,31	Virginija Petkevičienė	12,99	Adrija Grocienė	12,63
Long Jump	Živilė Šikšnelytė	6,11	Adrija Grocienė	5,99	Živilė Žebarauskaitė	5,63
High Jump	Nelė Žilinskienė	1,92	Jolanta Kviatkovskaja	1,84	Deimantė Meiliūnaitė	1,65
Pole Vault	Rita Snarskaitė	3,10	Anna Jermolajeva	2,20	Kristina Sabalytė	2,00
Shot Put	Austra Skujytė	16,03	Rūta Rakštytė	14,76	Kornelija Balčiūnaitė	12,57
Hammer Throw	Lina Skladaitytė	45,42	Laima Venclovaitė	44,41	Kristina Povilonytė	43,27
Discus Throw	Raminta Sakalauskaitė	47,91	Viktorija Patapova	43,99	Kristina Dirmeikytė	41,22
Javelin Throw	Rita Ramanauskaitė	57,07	Indrė Jakubaitytė	53,22	Inga Stasiulionytė	49,64

== Medals by city ==
Pl.	City	Gold medal	Silver medal	Bronze medal	Total
1	Kaunas	18	20	11	49
2	Vilnius	15	6	10	31
3	Šiauliai	2	3	3	8
4	Klaipėda	1	3	6	10
5	Švenčionys	1	1	1	3
6	Naujoji Akmenė	1	1	0	2
7	Marijampolė	0	3	0	3
8	Panevėžys	0	0	3	3
9	Vilkaviškis	0	0	1	1
