= 1997 IAAF World Indoor Championships – Women's 4 × 400 metres relay =

The women's 4 × 400 metres relay event at the 1997 IAAF World Indoor Championships was held on March 8–9.

== Medalists ==
| Gold | Silver | Bronze |
|---|---|---|
| Russia; Tatyana Chebykina; Svetlana Goncharenko; Olga Kotlyarova; Tatyana Alekseyeva; Natalya Sharova*; Yekaterina Bakhvalova* | United States; Shanelle Porter; Natasha Kaiser-Brown; Anita Howard; Jearl Miles Clark; Carlette Guidry* | Germany; Anja Rücker; Anke Feller; Heike Meißner; Grit Breuer; Anja Knippel* |

* Runners who participated in the heats only and received medals.

== Results ==
=== Heats ===
First 2 teams of each heat (Q) and the next 2 fastest (q) qualified for the final.

| Rank | Heat | Nation | Athletes | Time | Notes |
|---|---|---|---|---|---|
| 1 | 2 | Russia | Tatyana Chebykina, Natalya Sharova, Yekaterina Bakhvalova, Tatyana Alekseyeva | 3:29.85 | Q, WL |
| 2 | 2 | Ukraine | Tatyana Movchan, Aelita Yurchenko, Galyna Misiruk, Olga Moroz | 3:31.11 | Q |
| 3 | 2 | Czech Republic | Naděžda Koštovalová, Ludmila Formanová, Helena Fuchsová, Hana Benešová | 3:31.11 | q |
| 4 | 1 | Germany | Anja Knippel, Anke Feller, Heike Meißner, Anja Rücker | 3:31.56 | Q |
| 5 | 2 | United States | Anita Howard, Carlette Guidry, Natasha Kaiser-Brown, Jearl Miles Clark | 3:31.87 | q |
| 6 | 1 | Great Britain | Michelle Thomas, Jennifer Stoute, Donna Fraser, Sally Gunnell | 3:35.36 | Q |
| 7 | 1 | France | Marie-Line Scholent, Sandrine Thiébaud, Nicole Delars, Marie-Françoise Opheltès | 3:35.39 | |

=== Final ===
| Rank | Nation | Athletes | Time | Notes |
|---|---|---|---|---|
| 1st place, gold medalist(s) | Russia | Tatyana Chebykina, Svetlana Goncharenko, Olga Kotlyarova, Tatyana Alekseyeva | 3:26.84 | WR |
| 2nd place, silver medalist(s) | United States | Shanelle Porter, Natasha Kaiser-Brown, Anita Howard, Jearl Miles Clark | 3:27.66 | AR |
| 3rd place, bronze medalist(s) | Germany | Anja Rücker, Anke Feller, Heike Meißner, Grit Breuer | 3:28.39 | |
| 4 | Czech Republic | Naděžda Koštovalová, Ludmila Formanová, Helena Fuchsová, Hana Benešová | 3:28.47 | |
| 5 | Ukraine | Tatyana Movchan, Aelita Yurchenko, Galyna Misiruk, Olga Moroz | 3:30.43 | NR |
| 6 | Great Britain | Phylis Smith, Sally Gunnell, Michelle Thomas, Donna Fraser | 3:32.25 | NR |
