= 1998 European Athletics Championships – Women's 4 × 400 metres relay =

Women's 4 × 400 metres relay at the European Athletics Championships

The women's 4 × 400 metres relay at the 1998 European Athletics Championships was held at the Népstadion on 22 and 23 August.

== Medalists ==
Gold	Anke Feller; Uta Rohländer; Silvia Rieger; Grit Breuer; Germany
Silver	Natalya Khrushcheleva; Svetlana Goncharenko; Yekaterina Bakhvalova; Olga Kotlyarova; Russia
Bronze	Donna Fraser; Vicki Jamison; Katharine Merry; Allison Curbishley; Great Britain

== Results ==
KEY:	q	Fastest non-qualifiers	Q	Qualified	NR	National record	PB	Personal best	SB	Seasonal best

=== Heats ===
Qualification: First 3 in each heat (Q) and the next 2 fastest (q) advance to the Final.

Rank	Heat	Nation	Athlete	Time	Notes
1	2	Russia	Svetlana Goncharenko, Yekaterina Kulikova, Yekaterina Bakhvalova, Natalya Khrushcheleva	3:26.21	Q
2	2	Romania	Otilia Ruicu, Alina Rîpanu, Mariana Florea, Ionela Târlea	3:28.60	Q
3	2	Italy	Monika Niederstätter, Francesca Carbone, Fabiola Piroddi, Virna De Angeli	3:29.14	Q
4	2	France	Francine Landre, Anita Mormand, Marie-Françoise Opheltès, Fabienne Ficher	3:29.67	q
5	1	Czech Republic	Jitka Burianová, Ludmila Formanová, Hana Benešová, Helena Fuchsová	3:29.83	Q
6	1	Germany	Anke Feller, Anja Knippel, Martina Breu, Silvia Rieger	3:29.84	Q, SB
7	1	Great Britain	Vicki Jamison, Melanie Thomas, Tasha Danvers, Allison Curbishley	3:29.90	Q
8	1	Hungary	Annamaria Bori, Barbara Petráhn, Orsolya Dóczi, Judit Szekeres	3:30.24	q
9	2	Belarus	Natallia Solohub, Nelli Voronkova, Tanya Kurochkina, Anna Kozak	3:37.55	

=== Final ===
Rank	Nation	Athletes	Time	Notes
1st place, gold medalist(s)	Germany	Anke Feller, Uta Rohländer, Silvia Rieger, Grit Breuer	3:23.03	SB
2nd place, silver medalist(s)	Russia	Natalya Khrushcheleva, Svetlana Goncharenko, Yekaterina Bakhvalova, Olga Kotlyarova	3:23.56	SB
3rd place, bronze medalist(s)	Great Britain	Donna Fraser, Vicki Jamison, Katharine Merry, Allison Curbishley	3:25.66	SB
4	Romania	Otilia Ruicu, Alina Rîpanu, Mariana Florea, Ionela Târlea	3:27.24	NR
5	Czech Republic	Jitka Burianová, Ludmila Formanová, Hana Benešová, Helena Fuchsová	3:27.54	SB
6	France	Francine Landre, Anita Mormand, Marie-Françoise Opheltès, Viviane Dorsile	3:27.61	SB
7	Italy	Patrizia Spuri, Francesca Carbone, Fabiola Piroddi, Virna De Angeli	3:29.31	
8	Hungary	Annamaria Bori, Barbara Petráhn, Orsolya Dóczi, Judit Szekeres	3:31.83	
