= Suziann Reid =

American-Jamaican sprinter

Suziann Reid (Davis)
Personal information
- Nationality: American
- Born: January 14, 1977 (age 49) Kingston, Jamaica
- Height: 5 ft 6 in (1.68 m)

Sport
- Sport: Track and field
- Event: 400-meter dash
- College team: Texas Longhorns

Achievements and titles
- Personal best: 400 m: 50.74 (1999)
Medal record
Women's athletics
Representing the United States
World Championships
Silver medal – second place	1999 Seville	4×400 m relay
IAAF World Cup
Gold medal – first place	2002 Madrid	4×400 m relay
Summer Universiade
Gold medal – first place	1999 Palma de Mallorca	4x400 m relay

Suziann Reid (born January 14, 1977) is an American-Jamaican former track and field sprinter who specialized in the 400-meter dash. She set a personal record of 50.74 seconds for the distance in 1999. She was a silver medalist with the American women's 4 × 400-meter relay team at the 1999 World Championships in Athletics. She was part of the World Championship team twice more, in 2001 and 2005, and helped the United States to silver at the 2002 IAAF World Cup and gold at the 2001 Goodwill Games.

Reid competed collegiately for the Texas Longhorns and won three outdoor NCAA titles in the 400 m and two indoor NCAA titles. She also won four back-to-back NCAA outdoor titles in the 4 × 400 m relay. After her track career she became a writer and released Dark Secrets: Choosing Your Child's Sports Coach in 2013.

== Career ==
=== Early life and college ===
Born in Kingston, Jamaica with dual American citizenship, she moved the United States at age eleven and began attending Eleanor Roosevelt High School in Maryland. Her mother had been a track and field athlete in her youth. Reid took up cross country running at high school at age 14 and the coach suggested she try out for the indoor track team. It was a highly successful transition as she won a 400-meter dash and 800-meter run double at the Maryland state high school championship in 1992 then went on to take three consecutive sprint sweeps in the 100-meter dash, 200-meter dash and 400-meter dash from 1993 to 1995. At national level, she won 400 m at the National Scholastic Indoor Championships in 1994 and 1995. By the time she finished her high school career she had a best of 52.77 seconds for the 400 m.

Reid gained a sports scholarship to attend The University of Texas at Austin and began competing for their Texas Longhorns collegiate track team. In her first major competition she took third individually and in the 4 × 400-meter relay at the 1996 NCAA Division I Women's Indoor Track and Field Championships. Success followed at the NCAA Outdoor Championships where she was 400 m champion and helped set a collegiate record of 3:27.50 minutes to win the relay. Having gained eligibility to represent the United States, she won the American junior title in 400 m and won the silver medal behind Andrea Burlacu at the 1996 World Junior Championships in Athletics.

At the 1997 NCAA Indoors she was off the podium in the 400 m but improved to runner-up in the relay. She achieved a personal record of 50.95 seconds in the NCAA Outdoor Championships final, edged out by LaTarsha Stroman. She retained the relay title for the Texas Longhorns that year. In her last two years of college competition she went undefeated with back-to-back wins in the 400 m indoors and outdoors at the NCAA meet. She also helped the Longhorns to four straight NCAA 4 × 400 m relay titles from 1996 to 1999.

For her collegiate career, she was given the Honda Broderick Award (now the Honda Sports Award) as the female track and field athlete of the year in 1999.

=== Professional career ===
Reid was a frequent competitor for the United States in 4 × 400-meter relay team and her first medal with them came at the 1999 Summer Universiade, where she anchored a team of Yolanda Brown-Moore, Yulanda Nelson and Mikele Barber to the gold medals. She was the 400 m runner-up at the 1999 USA Outdoor Track and Field Championships to Maicel Malone and as result gained an individual and relay spot on the team for the 1999 World Championships in Athletics She was eliminated in the semi-finals of the 400 m, but won a silver medal leading off the relay team including Michelle Collins and Jearl Miles Clark, which finished behind Russia. Reid's career best run of 50.74 seconds that year ranked her third in the United States.

In the 2000 track season she won her first national title at the USA Indoor Track and Field Championships, bringing an end to Jearl Miles Clark's three-year streak. She failed to make the Olympic team after missing the final at the 2000 United States Olympic Trials. She repeated as USA Indoor champion and ran at the 2001 IAAF World Indoor Championships, though an injury during her run in the final saw her finish a distant sixth. With a fifth-place finish at the 2001 USA Outdoor Track and Field Championships she made the United States relay team. Reid did not another medal at the 2001 World Championships in Athletics as she dropped the baton on the final exchange and the team of Miles-Clark, Monique Hennagan and Collins ended in fourth as a result. Redemption came at the 2001 Goodwill Games, where she anchored the same team to a gold medal in 3:24.63 minutes.

In the last few years of her career, Reid remained a finalist at national level and made two last international appearances in the relay. A team of Collins, Crystal Cox, Reid and Hennagan claimed the silver medals behind the Americas team at the 2002 IAAF World Cup. At the 2005 World Championships in Athletics, Reid led off the American women, but a line violation in the heats stage saw them disqualified. She retired after that competition. She is the author of the book Dark Secrets. https://suziannreid.com/

In 2014, she married International and Constitutional Law Attorney Johnny B. Davis.

== Personal records ==
Outdoor

- 100 metres – 11.70 (2001)
- 200 metres – 23.15 (1999)
- 400 metres – 50.74 (1999)
- 800 metres – 2:23.80 (1998)
- 4 × 400 metres relay – 3:22.09 (1999)

Indoor

- 60 metres – 7.41 (1999)
- 200 metres – 23.13 (1999)
- 400 metres – 51.68 (1999)

All information from All-Athletics profile.

== International competitions ==
Year	Competition	Venue	Position	Event	Notes
1996	World Junior Championships	Sydney, Australia	2nd	400 m	53.17
1996	World Junior Championships	Sydney, Australia	4th	4 × 400 m relay	3:34.26
1999	Universiade	Palma de Mallorca, Spain	1st	4 × 400 m relay	3:27.97
1999	World Championships	Seville, Spain	8th (semis)	400 m	50.90
1999	World Championships	Seville, Spain	2nd	4 × 400 m relay	3:22.09
2001	World Indoor Championships	Lisbon, Portugal	6th	400 m	1:11.50
2001	World Championships	Edmonton, Canada	4th	4 × 400 m relay	3:26.88
2001	Goodwill Games	Brisbane, Australia	1st	4 × 400 m relay	3:24.63
2002	World Cup	Madrid, Spain	2nd	4 × 400 m relay	3:24.67
2005	World Championships	Helsinki, Finland	—	4 × 400 m relay	DQ

== National titles ==
- USA Indoor Track and Field Championships
  - 400 m: 2000, 2001
- NCAA Division I Women's Outdoor Track and Field Championships
  - 400 m: 1996, 1998, 1999
  - 4 × 400 m relay: 1996, 1997, 1998, 1999
- NCAA Division I Women's Indoor Track and Field Championships
  - 400 m: 1998, 1999

== See also ==
- List of World Championships in Athletics medalists (women)
