= 1997 European Athletics U23 Championships – Women's 400 metres =

The women's 400 metres event at the 1997 European Athletics U23 Championships was held in Turku, Finland, on 11 and 12 July 1997.

== Medalists ==
Gold	Allison Curbishley; Great Britain
Silver	Hana Benešová; Czech Republic
Bronze	Claudia Angerhausen; Germany

== Results ==
=== Final ===
12 July

Rank	Name	Nationality	Time	Notes
1st place, gold medalist(s)	Allison Curbishley	Great Britain	50.85	
2nd place, silver medalist(s)	Hana Benešová	Czech Republic	51.82	
3rd place, bronze medalist(s)	Claudia Angerhausen	Germany	53.45	
4	Larisa Bolenok	Russia	53.79	
5	Brigita Langerholc	Slovenia	53.80	
6	Riikka Niemelä	Finland	54.06	
7	Heidi Suomi	Finland	54.20	
8	Annamária Bori	Hungary	54.58	

=== Heats ===
11 July
Qualified: first 3 in each heat and 2 best to the Final

==== Heat 1 ====
Rank	Name	Nationality	Time	Notes
1	Hana Benešová	Czech Republic	53.35	Q
2	Brigita Langerholc	Slovenia	55.17	Q
3	Heidi Suomi	Finland	55.22	Q
4	Christina Panágou	Greece	55.35	
5	Irina Rosikhina	Russia	55.44	
6	Nicoletta Nobili	Italy	55.95	
7	Alice Kun	Hungary	56.56	
	Jovana Miljković	Yugoslavia	DNF	

==== Heat 2 ====
Rank	Name	Nationality	Time	Notes
1	Allison Curbishley	Great Britain	51.67	Q
2	Claudia Angerhausen	Germany	53.37	Q
3	Riikka Niemelä	Finland	53.99	Q
4	Larisa Bolenok	Russia	53.99	q
5	Annamária Bori	Hungary	54.43	q
6	Jitka Burianová	Czech Republic	54.48	
7	Manuela Caddeo	Italy	55.08	
8	Chrisoula Goudenoudi	Greece	55.11	

== Participation ==
According to an unofficial count, 16 athletes from 10 countries participated in the event.

- Czech Republic (2)
- Finland (2)
- Germany (1)
- Great Britain (1)
- Greece (2)
- Hungary (2)
- Italy (2)
- Russia (2)
- Slovenia (1)
- Yugoslavia (1)
