= 1997 European Athletics U23 Championships – Women's 4 × 400 metres relay =

The women's 4 x 400 metres relay event at the 1997 European Athletics U23 Championships was held in Turku, Finland, on 13 July 1997.

== Medalists ==
| Gold | Vicki Jamison; Joanne Sloane; Jeina Mitchell; Allison Curbishley; Great Britain |
| Silver | Nicole Marahrens; Shanta Ghosh; Claudia Gesell; Claudia Angerhausen; Germany |
| Bronze | Jitka Burianová; Eva Kasalová; Andrea Šuldesová; Hana Benešová; Czech Republic |

== Results ==
=== Final ===
13 July

| Rank | Nation | Competitors | Time | Notes |
|---|---|---|---|---|
| 1st place, gold medalist(s) | Great Britain | Vicki Jamison; Joanne Sloane; Jeina Mitchell; Allison Curbishley | 3:32.81 | |
| 2nd place, silver medalist(s) | Germany | Nicole Marahrens; Shanta Ghosh; Claudia Gesell; Claudia Angerhausen | 3:33.77 | |
| 3rd place, bronze medalist(s) | Czech Republic | Jitka Burianová; Eva Kasalová; Andrea Šuldesová; Hana Benešová | 3:33.83 | |
| 4 | Finland | Kirsi Kemppainen; Riikka Niemelä; Marika Engdal; Heidi Suomi | 3:34.88 | |
| 5 | Russia | Tatyana Levina; Lyudmila Goncharova; Larisa Bolenok; Irina Rosikhina | 3:35.21 | |
| 6 | Hungary | Alice Kun; Judit Varga; Orsolya Dóczi; Annamária Bori | 3:35.89 | |
| 7 | Italy | Federica Selis; Lara Rocco; Claudia Salvarani; Manuela Caddeo | 3:36.94 | |

== Participation ==
According to an unofficial count, 28 athletes from 7 countries participated in the event.

- Czech Republic (4)
- Finland (4)
- Germany (4)
- Great Britain (4)
- Hungary (4)
- Italy (4)
- Russia (4)
