= 1999 European Athletics U23 Championships – Women's 4 × 400 metres relay =

Sporting event

The women's 4 x 400 metres relay event at the 1999 European Athletics U23 Championships was held in Gothenburg, Sweden, at Ullevi on 31 July and 1 August 1999.

== Medalists ==
Gold	Tatyana Levina; Irina Yemelyanova; Marina Grishakova; Svetlana Pospelova; Russia
Silver	Nicole Marahrens; Anika Ahrens; Ulrike Urbansky; Claudia Marx; Germany
Bronze	Ramona Popovici; Anca Safta; Andrea Burlacu; Otilia Ruicu; Romania

== Results ==
=== Final ===
1 August

Rank	Nation	Competitors	Time	Notes
1st place, gold medalist(s)	Russia	Tatyana Levina; Irina Yemelyanova; Marina Grishakova; Svetlana Pospelova	3:29.04	CR
2nd place, silver medalist(s)	Germany	Nicole Marahrens; Anika Ahrens; Ulrike Urbansky; Claudia Marx	3:29.37	
3rd place, bronze medalist(s)	Romania	Ramona Popovici; Anca Safta; Andrea Burlacu; Otilia Ruicu	3:31.71	
4	Poland	Aleksandra Pielużek; Aleksandra Dereń; Anna Olichwierczuk; Grażyna Prokopek	3:33.28	
5	Czech Republic	Martina Morawska; Petra Sedláková; Klára Dubská; Jitka Burianová	3:33.56	
6	France	Olivia Abderrhamane; Katiana René; Sylvanie Morandais; Cindy Éga	3:33.59	
7	Sweden	Beatrice Dahlgren; Nadja Petersen; Carolina Nylén; Andrea Geurtsen	3:35.73	
	Great Britain	Louretta Thorne; Emma Davies; Lesley Owusu; Natasha Danvers	DNF	

=== Heats ===
31 July
Qualified: first 3 in each heat and 2 best to the Final

==== Heat 1 ====
Rank	Nation	Competitors	Time	Notes
1	Romania	Ramona Popovici; Anca Safta; Andrea Burlacu; Otilia Ruicu	3:32.39	Q
2	France	Olivia Abderrhamane; Katiana René; Sylvanie Morandais; Cindy Éga	3:33.49	Q
3	Czech Republic	Martina Morawska; Petra Sedláková; Klára Dubská; Jitka Burianová	3:34.65	Q
4	Hungary	Kinga Wéber; Renáta Balazsic; Enikő Szabó; Barbara Petráhn	3:35.08	
5	Yugoslavia	Jelena Stanisavljević; Jovana Miljković; Sanja Tripković; Biljana Mitrović	3:37.10	

==== Heat 2 ====
Rank	Nation	Competitors	Time	Notes
1	Russia	Tatyana Levina; Irina Yemelyanova; Marina Grishakova; Svetlana Pospelova	3:30.87	Q, CR
2	Germany	Andrea Luy; Anika Ahrens; Ulrike Urbansky; Claudia Marx	3:31.65	Q
3	Great Britain	Louretta Thorne; Emma Davies; Lesley Owusu; Natasha Danvers	3:31.70	Q
4	Poland	Monika Giemzo; Anna Olichwierczuk; Aleksandra Pielużek; Grażyna Prokopek	3:31.80	q
5	Sweden	Beatrice Dahlgren; Nadja Petersen; Carolina Nylén; Andrea Geurtsen	3:34.71	q

== Participation ==
According to an unofficial count, 42 athletes from 10 countries participated in the event.

- Czech Republic (4)
- France (4)
- Germany (5)
- Great Britain (4)
- Hungary (4)
- Poland (5)
- Romania (4)
- Russia (4)
- Sweden (4)
- Yugoslavia (4)
