= Tatyana Levina =

Russian sprinter

Tatyana Nikolayevna Levina (Russian: Татьяна Николаевна Левина; born 28 February 1977) is a Russian sprinter who specializes in the 200 metres and 4 × 400 metres relay.

== Achievements ==
Year	Competition	Venue	Position	Event	Notes
Representing Russia
1997	European U23 Championships	Turku, Finland	5th	4 × 400 m relay	3:35.21
1999	European U23 Championships	Gothenburg, Sweden	1st	4 × 400 m relay	3:29.04
2004	World Indoor Championships	Budapest, Hungary	1st	4 × 400 m relay	3:23.88 WR
2005	European Indoor Championships	Madrid, Spain	1st	4 × 400 m relay	3:28.00 CR
2006	World Indoor Championships	Moscow, Russia	1st	4 × 400 m relay	3:24.91
2008	World Indoor Championships	Valencia, Spain	1st	4 × 400 m relay	3:28.17

=== Personal bests (indoor) ===
- 200 metres - 23.22 s (2006)
- 400 metres - 51.17 s (2006)
