= Svetlana Pospelova =

Russian sprinter (born 1979)

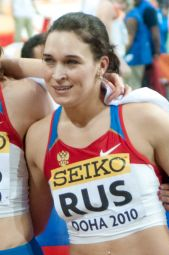
Pospelova at the 2010 IAAF World Indoor Championships

Svetlana Mikhailovna Pospelova (Russian: Светлана Михайловна Поспелова; born December 24, 1979, in Saint Petersburg) is a Russian sprinter who primarily competes over 400 metres.

She was banned from competing in 2000 after she failed an out-of-competition test at the 2000 Summer Olympics. She received a two-year ban from the sport for the positive test for stanozolol.

== International competitions ==
Representing Russia
Year	Competition	Venue	Position	Event	Notes
1998	World Junior Championships	Annecy, France	18th (h)	400 m	54.80
1998	World Junior Championships	Annecy, France	2nd	4 × 400 m relay	3:32.35
1999	European U23 Championships	Gothenburg, Sweden	12th (h)	400 m	54.05
1999	European U23 Championships	Gothenburg, Sweden	1st	4 × 400 m relay	3:29.04
2005	European Indoor Championships	Madrid, Spain	1st	400 metres	50.41
2005	World Championships	Helsinki, Finland	4th	400 metres	50.11
2005	World Championships	Helsinki, Finland	1st	4 × 400 m relay	3:20.95
2006	European Championships	Gothenburg, Sweden	7th	400 metres	50.90
2006	European Championships	Gothenburg, Sweden	1st	4 × 400 m relay	3:25.12
2010	World Indoor Championships	Doha, Qatar	DSQ (2nd)	4 × 400 m relay	3:27.44

== Personal bests ==
- 100 metres - 11.32 (2005)
- 200 metres - 22.39 (2005)
- 400 metres - 49.80 (2005)

== See also ==
- List of doping cases in athletics
- List of European Athletics Indoor Championships medalists (women)
- List of European Athletics Championships medalists (women)
- List of people from Saint Petersburg
