= Otilia Ruicu-Eșanu =

Romanian sprinter (born 1978)

Personal information
- Born: 20 August 1978 (age 48) Lugoj, Romania

Sport
- Sport: Track and field
Medal record
Representing Romania
European U23 Championships
Gold medal – first place	1999 Gothenburg	400m
Bronze medal – third place	1999 Gothenburg	4x400m relay
European Indoor Championships
Bronze medal – third place	2000 Ghent	4x400m relay
Summer Universiade
Silver medal – second place	2001 Beijing	400m

Otilia Silvia Ruicu-Eșanu (born 20 August 1978) is a retired Romanian athlete who specialised in the 400 metres. She represented her country at the 2000 Summer Olympics reaching the second round.

== Competition record ==
Year	Competition	Venue	Position	Event	Notes
Representing Romania
1996	World Junior Championships	Sydney, Australia	6th	400 m	53.87
1996	World Junior Championships	Sydney, Australia	2nd	4 × 400 m relay	3:32.16
1998	European Championships	Budapest, Hungary	14th (sf)	400 m	53.17
1998	European Championships	Budapest, Hungary	4th	4 × 400 m relay	3:27.24
1999	Universiade	Palma de Mallorca, Spain	5th	400 m	51.50
1999	European U23 Championships	Gothenburg, Sweden	1st	400 m	51.93
1999	European U23 Championships	Gothenburg, Sweden	3rd	4 × 400 m relay	3:31.71
1999	World Championships	Seville, Spain	20th (sf)	400 m	51.86
2000	European Indoor Championships	Ghent, Belgium	11th (sf)	400 m	53.44
2000	European Indoor Championships	Ghent, Belgium	3rd	4 × 400 m relay	3:36.28
2000	Olympic Games	Sydney, Australia	22nd (qf)	400 m	52.28
2001	Jeux de la Francophonie	Ottawa, Ontario, Canada	4th	400 m	52.33
2001	World Championships	Edmonton, Canada	24th (h)	400 m	52.33
2001	Universiade	Beijing, China	2nd	400 m	51.82
2002	European Championships	Munich, Germany	17th (h)	400 m	53.35

== Personal bests ==
Outdoor

- 400 metres – 51.47 (Funchal 2001)
- 800 metres – 2:02.58 (Barletta 2002)

Indoor

- 400 metres – 53.40 (Ghent 2000)
