= Natalya Sharova =

Russian sprinter

Personal information
- Born: October 4, 1972 (age 54)

Achievements and titles
- National finals: 1998 Russian Champs; • 400 m, 5th; 1999 Russian Indoors; • 400 m, 3rd (bronze); 1999 Russian Champs; • 400 m, 5th
Medal record
Women's athletics
Representing Jamaica
IAAF World Championships
Gold medal – first place	1999 Seville	4 × 400 m
IAAF World Indoor Championships
Gold medal – first place	1997 Paris	4 × 400 m
World University Games
Gold medal – first place	1997 Catania	4 × 400 m

Natalya Sharova (born October 4, 1972) is a former sprinter from Russia. She won a gold medal in the 4 × 400 m relay at the 1999 World Championships in Athletics and in the 1997 World Indoor Championships in Athletics, in both cases by virtue of running in the heats for her team.

She also won a gold medal in the 4 × 400 m at the 1997 Summer Universiade by running in the final. She continued to run professionally until 2004.

== Major international competitions ==
Year	Competition	Venue	Position	Event	Notes
1997	IAAF World Indoor Championships	Paris, France	1st (Heat 2, Heats)	4 × 400 m	3:29.85
1999	IAAF World Championships in Athletics	Sevilla, Spain	1st (Heat 1, Heats)	4 × 400 m	3:24.51

== Domestic competitions ==
Year	Competition	Venue	Position	Event	Notes
2002	Russia Indoor Championships	Volgograd, Russia	2nd (Heat 1, Heats)	400 m	54.05
2002	Russia Championships	Cheboksary, Russia	4th (Heat 1, Heats)	800 m	2:05.97
2003	Russia Championships	Tula, Russia	5th (Heat 7, Heats)	400 m	54.87
2004	Russia Championships	Tula, Russia	4th (Heat 3, Heats)	400 m	54.22
