= Hana Benešová =

Czech sprinter

Personal information
- Born: 19 April 1975 (age 50) Čáslav, Czechoslovakia
- Height: 1.70 m (5 ft 7 in)
- Weight: 60 kg (132 lb)

Sport
- Sport: Track and field
- Event(s): 200 metres, 400 metres
- Club: AC Čáslav

Hana Benešová (born 19 April 1975 in Čáslav) is a retired Czech sprinter who competed in the 200 and 400 metres. She represented her country at the 1996 and 2000 Summer Olympics, as well as four consecutive World Championships, starting in 1993. In addition, she won three medals at the 1997 European U23 Championships.

== Competition record ==
Year	Competition	Venue	Position	Event	Notes
Representing Czechoslovakia
1991	European Junior Championships	Thessaloniki, Greece	7th	100 m	11.78
1991	European Junior Championships	Thessaloniki, Greece	4th	200 m	23.94
1992	World Junior Championships	Seoul, South Korea	5th	400 m	53.39
1992	World Junior Championships	Seoul, South Korea	9th (h)	4 × 400 m relay	3:42.02
Representing the Czech Republic
1993	European Junior Championships	San Sebastián, Spain	1st	100 m	11.56
1993	European Junior Championships	San Sebastián, Spain	2nd	200 m	23.53
1993	European Junior Championships	San Sebastián, Spain	–	4 × 400 m relay	DQ
1993	World Championships	Stuttgart, Germany	36th (h)	100 m	11.72
1993	World Championships	Stuttgart, Germany	7th	4 × 400 m relay	3:27.94
1994	European Indoor Championships	Paris, France	11th (h)	60 m	7.38
1994	European Indoor Championships	Paris, France	4th	200 m	23.67
1994	World Junior Championships	Lisbon, Portugal	3rd	400 m	52.60
1994	World Junior Championships	Lisbon, Portugal	–	4 × 100 m relay	DQ
1994	European Championships	Helsinki, Finland	14th (sf)	400 m	53.66
1994	European Championships	Helsinki, Finland	5th	4 × 400 m relay	3:27.95
1995	World Indoor Championships	Barcelona, Spain	13th (h)	200 m	23.87
1995	World Indoor Championships	Barcelona, Spain	2nd	4 × 400 m relay	3:30.27
1995	World Championships	Gothenburg, Sweden	8th (h)	4 × 400 m relay	3:26.27
1996	European Indoor Championships	Stockholm, Sweden	6th (B)	400 m	52.23
1996	Olympic Games	Atlanta, United States	13th (qf)	400 m	51.30
1996	Olympic Games	Atlanta, United States	7th	4 × 400 m relay	3:26.99
1997	World Indoor Championships	Paris, France	8th (sf)	400 m	52.75
1997	World Indoor Championships	Paris, France	4th	4 × 400 m relay	3:28.47
1997	European U23 Championships	Turku, Finland	1st	200 m	22.57
1997	European U23 Championships	Turku, Finland	2nd	400 m	51.82
1997	European U23 Championships	Turku, Finland	3rd	4 × 400 m relay	3:33.83
1997	World Championships	Athens, Greece	25th (qf)	200 m	23.34
1997	World Championships	Athens, Greece	25th (h)	400 m	52.74
1997	World Championships	Athens, Greece	5th	4 × 400 m relay	3:23.73
1998	European Indoor Championships	Valencia, Spain	19th (h)	200 m	29.03
1998	European Indoor Championships	Valencia, Spain	6th	400 m	54.89
1998	European Championships	Budapest, Hungary	26th (h)	200 m	24.04
1998	European Championships	Budapest, Hungary	5th	4 × 400 m relay	3:27.54
1999	World Championships	Seville, Spain	41st (h)	200 m	23.84
1999	World Championships	Seville, Spain	4th	4 × 400 m relay	3:23.82
2000	Olympic Games	Sydney, Australia	29th (qf)	400 m	52.70
2000	Olympic Games	Sydney, Australia	7th	4 × 400 m relay	3:29.17

== Personal bests ==
Outdoor

- 100 metres – 11.45 (-0.4 m/s) (Jablonec nad Nisou 1993)
- 200 metres – 22.57 (+1.7 m/s) (Turku 1997)
- 400 metres – 51.18 (Prague 1997)

Indoor

- 60 metres – 7.38 (Paris 1994)
- 200 metres – 23.15 (Vienna 1997)
- 400 metres – 52.12 (Prague 1997)
