= Jitka Burianová =

Czech sprinter

Jitka Burianová (born 17 January 1977, in Prostějov) is a retired Czech sprinter who specialised in the 400 metres. She represented her country at the 2000 Summer Olympics reaching semifinals individually and placing seventh in the 4 × 400 metres relay.

== Competition record ==
Year	Competition	Venue	Position	Event	Notes
Representing the Czech Republic
1995	European Junior Championships	Nyíregyháza, Hungary	3rd	400 m	53.69
1995	European Junior Championships	Nyíregyháza, Hungary	3rd (h)	4x100 m relay	45.68
1996	World Junior Championships	Sydney, Australia	12th (sf)	200 m	24.43
1996	World Junior Championships	Sydney, Australia	11th (sf)	400 m	54.52
1996	World Junior Championships	Sydney, Australia	11th (h)	4x100 m relay	45.88
1997	European U23 Championships	Turku, Finland	7th (h)	400 m	54.48
1997	European U23 Championships	Turku, Finland	3rd	4x400 m relay	3:33.83
1998	European Championships	Budapest, Hungary	10th (sf)	400 m	52.41
1998	European Championships	Budapest, Hungary	5th	4x400 m relay	3:27.54
1999	European U23 Championships	Gothenburg, Sweden	2nd	400 m	52.01
1999	European U23 Championships	Gothenburg, Sweden	5th	4x400 m relay	3:33.56
1999	World Championships	Seville, Spain	27th (qf)	400 m	52.52
1999	World Championships	Seville, Spain	4th	4x400 m relay	3:23.82
2000	European Indoor Championships	Ghent, Belgium	7th (sf)	400 m	52.96
2000	Olympic Games	Sydney, Australia	9th (sf)	400 m	51.15
2000	Olympic Games	Sydney, Australia	7th	4x400 m relay	3:29.17
2001	World Championships	Edmonton, Canada	35th (h)	400 m	53.29

== Personal bests ==
Outdoor

- 200 metres – 23.31 (-0.1 m/s) (Prague 2000)
- 400 metres – 50.85 (Sydney 2000)
- 400 metres hurdles – 58.83 (Vilamoura 1998)

Indoor

- 200 metres – 23.81 (Prague 2000)
- 400 metres – 52.51 (Prague 2000)
