= Irina Rosikhina =

Russian sprinter (born 1975)

Medal record

Women's athletics

World Championships
Bronze medal – third place	2001 Edmonton	4 × 400 m relay

European Indoor Championships
Gold medal – first place	2000 Ghent	4 × 400 m relay

Irina Nikolayevna Rosikhina (Russian: Ири́на Николаевна Роси́хина; born 11 May 1975, Kamensk-Shakhtinsky) is a Russian retired sprinter who specializes in the 400 metres.

Her coaches were Anatoly Georgievich Timofeev and later Viktor Vasilyevich Pushkin.

== Achievements ==
Year	Competition	Venue	Position	Event	Notes
Representing Russia
1997	European U23 Championships	Turku, Finland	12th (h)	400 m	55.44
1997	European U23 Championships	Turku, Finland	5th	4 × 400 m relay	3:35.21
1999	Military World Games	Zagreb, Croatia	1st	400 m	52.46
2001	World Championships	Edmonton, Canada	3rd	4 × 400 m relay	3:24.92
2005	European Indoor Championships	Madrid, Spain	3rd	400 m	52.05
2005	European Indoor Championships	Madrid, Spain	1st	4 × 400 m relay	3:28.00 CR

=== Personal bests ===
- 200 metres - 23.31 s (2005)
- 400 metres - 50.66 s (2004)
