= Mikele Barber =

American sprinter (born 1980)

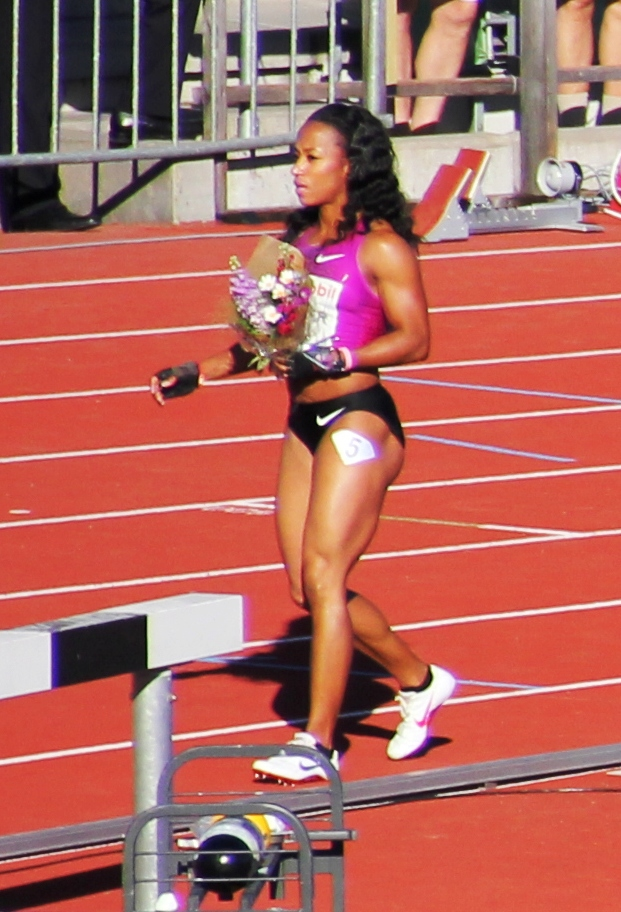

Personal information
- Born: October 4, 1980 (age 46) Livingston, New Jersey, United States

Sport
- Sport: Track and field
- Club: South Carolina Gamecocks
Medal record
Representing the United States
World Championships
Gold medal – first place	2007 Osaka	4 × 100 m relay
Pan American Games
Gold medal – first place	2007 Rio de Janeiro	100 m
Silver medal – second place	2007 Rio de Janeiro	4 × 100 m relay
Summer Universiade
Gold medal – first place	1999 Palma de Mallorca	4 x 400 m relay
Gold medal – first place	2001 Beijing	4 x 400 m relay
Silver medal – second place	1999 Palma de Mallorca	400 m
Bronze medal – third place	2001 Beijing	400 m

Mikele "Miki" Ronisse Barber (born October 4, 1980) is an American sprinter who won gold at the 4 × 100 meters relay event in 2007 World Championships in Athletics, in Osaka, Japan, and an individual gold medal at the 100 meters in 2007 Pan Am Games in Rio de Janeiro, Brazil.

She is the twin sister of Me'Lisa Barber, who has also won relay medals on the world stage.

Running for the South Carolina Gamecocks track and field team, Barber won the 2001 4 × 400 meter relay at the NCAA Division I Indoor Track and Field Championships.
