= Heidi Suomi =

Finnish sprinter

Personal information
- Nationality: Finnish
- Born: 2 January 1975 (age 50)

Sport
- Sport: Sprinting
- Event: 4 × 100 metres relay

Heidi Suomi (born 2 January 1975) is a Finnish sprinter. She competed in the women's 4 × 100 metres relay at the 1996 Summer Olympics.
