= Anke Feller =

German sprinter

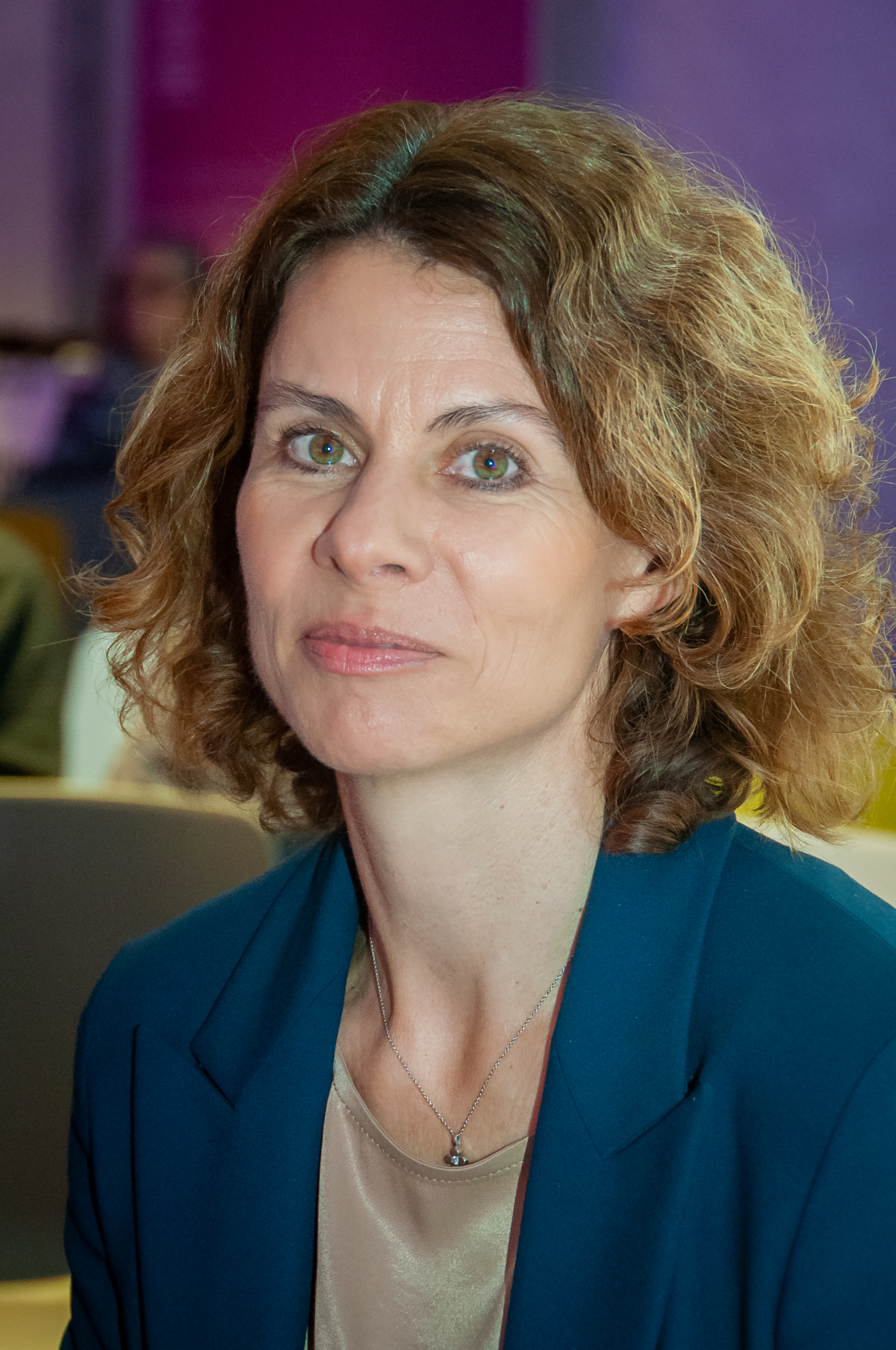
- Anke Feller in 2024

Personal information
- Born: 26 September 1971 (age 55) Göttingen, West Germany

Sport
- Sport: Track and field
Medal record
Representing Germany
World Championships
Gold medal – first place	1997 Athens	4x400 m relay
Bronze medal – third place	1999 Seville	4x400 m relay
World Indoor Championships
Bronze medal – third place	1997 Paris	4x400 m relay
European Championships
Gold medal – first place	1998 Budapest	4×400 m relay

Anke Feller (born 26 September 1971) is a retired German sprinter, who specialized in the 400 metres.

Her personal best time is 51.82 seconds, achieved in July 1999 in Erfurt.

== Achievements ==
Year	Competition	Venue	Position	Event	Notes
Representing West Germany
1988	World Junior Championships	Sudbury, Canada	7th	4 × 100 m relay	45.56
Representing Germany
1997	World Indoor Championships	Paris, France	3rd	4 × 400 m relay	3:28.39
1997	World Championships	Athens, Greece	1st	4 × 400 m relay	3:20.92
1998	European Championships	Budapest, Hungary	1st	4 × 400 m relay	3:23.03
1998	World Cup	Johannesburg, South Africa	1st	4 × 400 m relay	3:24.26
1999	World Championships	Seville, Spain	3rd	4 × 400 m relay	3:22.43
