= Natalya Khrushcheleva =

Russian middle-distance runner

Personal information
- Born: 20 March 1973 (age 53) Tavda, Soviet Union

Sport
- Sport: Track and field
Medal record
Representing Russia
World Championships
Bronze medal – third place	2003 Paris	800 m
European Championships
Silver medal – second place	1994 Helsinki	4×400 m relay
Silver medal – second place	1998 Budapest	4×400 m relay
Summer Universiade
Gold medal – first place	1995 Fukuoka	4x400 m relay
Silver medal – second place	1999 Palma de Mallorca	4x400 m relay

Natalya Khrushcheleva (born 20 March 1973, Russian: Наталья Хрущелёва) is a retired Russian middle-distance runner who won a bronze medal in 800 metres at the 2003 World Championships in Athletics. She has also been a member of the Russian 4 × 400 metres relay team.

== International competitions ==
Year	Competition	Venue	Position	Event	Notes
Representing the Commonwealth of Independent States
1992	World Junior Championships	Seoul, South Korea	8th	4 × 400 m relay	3:39.76
Representing Russia
1994	European Championships	Helsinki, Finland	2nd	4 × 400 m relay	3:24.06
1998	European Championships	Budapest, Hungary	2nd	4 × 400 m relay	3:23.56
2003	World Championships	Paris, France	3rd	800 m	2:00.29
2003	World Athletics Final	Monte Carlo, Monaco	7th	800 m	2:00.96

== Personal bests ==
- 400 metres - 51.49 seconds (2000)
- 800 metres - 1:56.59 min (2004)

== See also ==
- List of World Athletics Championships medalists (women)
- List of European Athletics Championships medalists (women)
- 800 metres at the World Championships in Athletics
