= Allison Curbishley =

British athlete

Personal information
- Nationality: British (Scottish)
- Born: 3 June 1976 (age 50) Stockton-on-Tees, Durham, England
- Height: 167 cm (5 ft 6 in)
- Weight: 58 kg (128 lb)

Sport
- Sport: Women's athletics
- Events: 400 m, 4 x 400 m
- Club: Edinburgh Woollen Mills AC
Medal record
Representing Scotland
Commonwealth Games
Silver medal – second place	1998 Kuala Lumpur	400 m
Representing Great Britain
European Championships
Bronze medal – third place	1998 Budapest	4x400 m
European U23 Championships
Gold medal – first place	1997 Turku	400 m
Gold medal – first place	1997 Turku	4x400 m
Summer Universiade
Gold medal – first place	1997 Catania	400 m
Bronze medal – third place	1997 Catania	4x400 m

Allison Curbishley (born 3 June 1976) is a former British athlete from Stockton-on-Tees but who represented Scotland and specialised in the 400 metres. She competed at two Olympic Games.

== Biography ==
Curbishley became involved in a play scheme in the summer holiday when she was ten years old and this sparked Curbishley's interest in sport. Although athletics was the sport she eventually chose she also reached county standard in netball and field hockey.

At the 1996 Olympic Games in Atlanta, Curbishly represented Great Britain in the 4 x 400 metres relay event.

Curbishley finished third behind Phylis Smith in the 400 metres event at the 1996 AAA Championships. In 1998, she became the British 400 metres champion after winning the British AAA Championships title at the 1998 AAA Championships.

Shortly after becoming AA Champion Curbishley represented Scotland at the 1998 Commonwealth Games in Kuala Lumpur, Malaysia

At the 2000 Olympic Games in Sydney, Curbishley represented Great Britain in both the 400 metres and relay events.

She graduated from the University of Birmingham with a degree in Sport and Exercise Sciences. During her career her knee was operated on six times, and the injury finally led to her retirement in 2003. She is now working in broadcasting for the BBC and her partner is fellow BBC commentator Steve Cram with whom she lives in Northumberland.

== International competitions ==
Year	Competition	Venue	Position	Event	Notes
Representing Great Britain and Scotland
1994	World Junior Championships	Lisbon, Portugal	24th (h)	400m hurdles	66.68
1994	World Junior Championships	Lisbon, Portugal	8th	4 × 400 m relay	3:39.80
1997	Summer Universiade	Catania, Italy	1st	400 m	50.84
1997	European U23 Championships	Turku, Finland	1st	400m	50.85
1997	European U23 Championships	Turku, Finland	1st	4 × 400 m relay	3:32.81
1998	Commonwealth Games	Kuala Lumpur, Malaysia	2nd	400 m	50.71
1998	European Championships	Budapest, Hungary	3rd	4 × 400 m	3:25.66

Preceded by Lorraine Hanson	British Champion in 400 m 1998	Succeeded by Katharine Merry
