= Olga Kotlyarova =

Russian runner (born 1976)

Personal information
- Born: 12 April 1976 (age 50) Sverdlovsk, Soviet Union

Sport
- Sport: Track and field
Medal record
Representing Russia
Olympic Games
Bronze medal – third place	2000 Sydney	4×400 m relay
World Championships
Gold medal – first place	1999 Seville	4x400 m relay
World Indoor Championships
Gold medal – first place	1997 Paris	4x400 m relay
Gold medal – first place	1999 Maebashi	4x400 m relay
Gold medal – first place	2001 Lisbon	4x400 m relay
Gold medal – first place	2004 Budapest	4x400 m relay
Silver medal – second place	2001 Lisbon	400 m
European Championships
Gold medal – first place	2006 Gothenburg	800 m
Silver medal – second place	1998 Budapest	4×400 m relay
Bronze medal – third place	1998 Budapest	400 m
European Indoor Championships
Silver medal – second place	1996 Stockholm	400 m
Summer Universiade
Gold medal – first place	1997 Catania	4x400 m relay
Silver medal – second place	1997 Catania	400 m

Olga Ivanovna Kotlyarova (born 12 April 1976) is a retired Russian runner. She used to compete mainly in 400 metres, and has an Olympic bronze medal from 2000 in relay. She is also a world champion (indoor and outdoor) in this event.

In 2005, she concentrated more on the 800 metres distance, managing to set a new personal best and to finish fourth at the World Athletics Final.

In August 2006, she became the European Champion in the 800 metres.

== Personal bests ==
- 200 metres - 23.35 (1996)
- 400 metres - 49.77 (2004)
- 800 metres - 1:57.24 (2006)

== International competitions ==
Representing Russia
Year	Competition	Venue	Position	Event	Time	Notes
1994	World Junior Championships	Lisbon, Portugal	20th (qf)	200 m	24.58	wind: +0.4 m/s
1994	World Junior Championships	Lisbon, Portugal	4th	4 × 400 m relay	3:37.41	
1996	European Indoor Championships	Stockholm, Sweden	2nd	400 metres	51.70	
1997	World Indoor Championships	Paris, France	1st	4 × 400 m relay	3:26.84	WR
1997	Summer Universiade	Catania, Italy	2nd	400 metres	51.35	
1998	European Championships	Budapest, Hungary	3rd	400 metres	50.38	
1998	European Championships	Budapest, Hungary	2nd	4 × 400 m relay	3:23.56	
1999	World Indoor Championships	Maebashi, Japan	1st	4 × 400 m relay	3:24.25	WR
1999	World Championships	Seville, Spain	1st	4 × 400 m relay	3:21.98	
2000	Summer Olympics	Sydney, Australia	3rd	4 × 400 m relay	3:23.46	
2001	World Indoor Championships	Lisbon, Portugal	2nd	400 metres	51.56	
2001	World Indoor Championships	Lisbon, Portugal	1st	4 × 400 m relay	3:30.00	
2004	World Indoor Championships	Budapest, Hungary	1st	4 × 400 m relay	3:23.88	WR
2006	European Championships	Gothenburg, Sweden	1st	800 m	1:57.38	
