= Carmo Tavares =

Portuguese middle-distance runner

Personal information
- Full name: María do Carmo Sánchez; Tavares de Miranda
- Nationality: Portugal
- Born: 27 April 1974 (age 52) Lisbon, Portugal
- Height: 1.65 m (5 ft 5 in)
- Weight: 55 kg (121 lb)

Sport
- Sport: Athletics
- Event: Middle-distance running

Achievements and titles
- Personal best: 800 m: 2:01.14 (2008)

María do Carmo Sánchez Tavares de Miranda (born 27 April 1974) is a Portuguese middle-distance runner, who specialized in the 800 metres. At age thirty-four, Tavares made her official debut for the 2008 Summer Olympics in Beijing, where she competed in the women's 800 metres. She ran in the sixth and final heat against six other athletes, including Kenya's Janeth Jepkosgei Busienei, who eventually won the silver medal in the final. She finished the race in sixth place by more than a second behind Italy's Elisa Cusma Piccione, with a time of 2:01.91. Tavares, however, failed to advance into the semi-finals, as she placed twenty-first overall, and was ranked farther below three mandatory slots for the next round.
