= Donna Fraser =

British sprinter (born 1972)

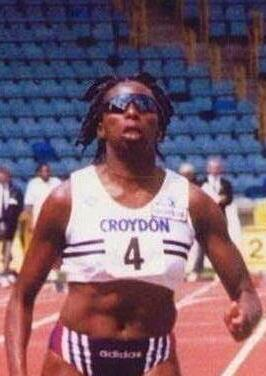
- Fraser competing in a UK Women's League match at Birmingham

Personal information
- Nationality: British (English)
- Born: 7 November 1972 (age 53) Thornton Heath, Croydon, England
- Height: 180 cm (5 ft 11 in)
- Weight: 64 kg (141 lb)

Sport
- Sport: Athletics
- Event: Sprints/400m
- Club: Croydon Harriers
Medal record
Representing Great Britain
Athletics
World Championships
Bronze medal – third place	2005 Helsinki	4x400 m relay
Bronze medal – third place	2007 Osaka	4x400 m relay
Commonwealth Games
Bronze medal – third place	1998 Kuala Lumpur	400 m
Bronze medal – third place	1998 Kuala Lumpur	4x100 m relay
European Championships
Bronze medal – third place	1998 Budapest	4x400 m relay
European Indoor Championships
Silver medal – second place	2009 Torino	4x400 m relay
Bronze medal – third place	2005 Madrid	4x400 m relay
World Junior Championships
Silver medal – second place	1990 Plovdiv	4x100 m relay
European Junior Championships
Gold medal – first place	1991 Thessaloniki	400 m
Silver medal – second place	1991 Thessaloniki	4x100 m relay

Donna Karen Fraser OBE (born 7 November 1972) in Thornton Heath, Croydon is an English former athlete, who mainly competed in the 200 and 400 m.

== Biography ==
An exceptional junior, Fraser won six English Schools 200 m titles (as well as a silver medal for the 4 × 100 m at the 1990 World Junior Championships) before turning to the 400 m in 1991 and becoming European Junior Champion at the distance the same year (also gaining a silver medal for the 4 × 100 m).

However, she didn't improve until 1996, when she began to concentrate on the 400 metres and in 1997 Fraser won the 1997 British Athletics Championships 400 metres title and in addition she finished second behind Jamaican Evadnie McKenzie in the 100 metres event at the 1997 AAA Championships. By virtue of being the highest placed British athlete at the AAAs she was considered the British 100 metres champion as well.

Fraser was an individual finalist and 4 × 400 m relay relay team bronze medallist at the European Championships and also won two bronze medals at the 1998 Commonwealth Games in Malaysia.

However, it was at the 2000 Sydney Olympics that she finally realised her potential, after winning the AAA title, she shaved nearly a second off her personal best to finish fourth in the Olympic final with a time of 49.79 seconds. This achievement was largely attributed to her training alongside Olympic champion Cathy Freeman that season.

Her career after 2000 stalled due to a catalogue of injuries (including a torn achilles tendon) but she returned to win the 400 metres title at the 2005 AAA Championships and win the BBC London Athlete of the Year Award for 2005. At the 2007 World Championships in Athletics, Fraser went as part of the 4 × 400 m relay squad. Despite not running in the final, she received a bronze medal, as she competed in the heats on the second leg.

In September 2009, she announced that she was going to leave athletics to return to working full-time at EDF Energy. Her final major race was the 400 m at the British Grand Prix at Gateshead, where she finished 7th with a time of 54.11 seconds. However, she has continued to race for the Croydon Harriers, an athletics club based at the Croydon Sports Arena.

Fraser was appointed Officer of the Order of the British Empire (OBE) in the 2021 New Year Honours for services to equality, inclusion and diversity in the workplace. Fraser worked at the Birmingham 2022 Commonwealth Games Organising Committee as Head of Inclusion and Engagement. In 2022, she was named World Athletics' Woman of the Year.

== Major achievements ==
Representing Great Britain and England
Year	Competition	Venue	Position	Event	Notes
1990	World Junior Championships	Plovdiv, Bulgaria	13th (sf)	200 m	24.19 (wind: +0.5 m/s)
1990	World Junior Championships	Plovdiv, Bulgaria	2nd	4 × 100 m relay	44.16
1991	European Junior Championships	Thessaloniki, Greece	1st	400 m	53.54
1991	European Junior Championships	Thessaloniki, Greece	2nd	4 × 100 m relay	44.57
1998	European Championships	Budapest, Hungary	6th	400 m	51.54
1998	European Championships	Budapest, Hungary	3rd	4 × 400 m relay	3:25.66
1998	Commonwealth Games	Kuala Lumpur, Malaysia	3rd	400 m	51.01
1998	Commonwealth Games	Kuala Lumpur, Malaysia	3rd	4 × 100 m relay	3:29.28
2000	Olympics	Sydney, Australia	4th	400 m	49.79
2005	European Indoor Championships	Madrid, Spain	3rd	4 × 400 m relay	3:29.81
2005	World Championships	Helsinki, Finland	3rd	4 × 400 m relay	3:24.44
2007	World Championships	Osaka, Japan	3rd	4 × 400 m relay	3:25.45^{1}
2009	European Indoor Championships	Turin, Italy	2nd	4 × 400 m relay	3:30.42

^{1}Time from the heats; Fraser was replaced in the final.

Preceded by Katharine Merry	British Champion in 400m 2000	Succeeded by Lesley Owusu
Preceded by Christine Ohuruogu	British Champion in 400m 2005	Succeeded by Nicola Sanders
