= Barbara Petráhn =

Hungarian sprinter

Barbara Petráhn (born 16 September 1978 in Sopron) is a Hungarian track and field sprinter who specializes in the 100 metres, 200 metres and 400 metres.

Petráhn competed for the Baylor Bears track and field team in the NCAA.

An 11 time Hungarian Athletics Championships winner in 400 metres, Petráhn matched the national record of the distance (51.50 seconds) in 2006, tying Ilona Pál's record set in 1980. She raced at two Olympics in this event in 2000 and 2008. In her first participation at the 2000 Summer Olympics in Sydney, Petráhn made it from the first round to the quarterfinals, where she came last in her heat and did not advance further. At the 2008 Summer Olympics in Beijing she came only fourth in her first round heat thus did not manage to go to the quarterfinals.

Beside 400 metres, she also had successes in 200 metres, most notably winning 5 Hungarian Athletics Championships titles, including four in a row between 2007 and 2010.

== Personal bests ==
As of 20 May 2012

Outdoor

Event	Time (seconds)	Venue	Date
100 metres	11.49	Budapest, Hungary	16 June 2001
200 metres	23.17	Szombathely, Hungary	14 July 2002
400 metres	51.50	Xalapa, Mexico	13 May 2006

Indoor

Event	Time (seconds)	Venue	Date
60 metres	7.61	Budapest, Hungary	27 February 2010
200 metres	23.87	Lincoln, United States	23 February 2002
400 metres	53.68	Budapest, Hungary	19 February 2005

== Awards ==
- Hungarian athlete of the Year (1): 2007
