= Žana Minina =

Lithuanian sprinter (born 1977)

Personal information
- Nationality: Lithuanian
- Born: 11 June 1977 (age 49) Vilnius, Soviet Union

Sport
- Sport: Sprinting
- Event: 400 metres

Žana Minina (born 11 June 1977) is a Lithuanian sprinter. She competed in the women's 400 metres at the 2000 Summer Olympics.
