= List of Ukrainian Athletics Championships winners =

The Ukrainian Athletics Championships (Ukrainian: Чемпіонат України з легкої атлетики) is an annual outdoor track and field competition organised by the Ukrainian Athletic Federation, which serves as the national championship for the sport in Ukraine. The competition was first held as a top level national competition in 1992, superseding the Soviet Athletics Championships following the dissolution of the Soviet Union.

== Men ==
=== 100 metres ===
- 1992: Konstantin Gromadskiy
- 1993: Aleksandr Shlychkov
- 1994: Vladyslav Dolohodin
- 1995: Aleksey Chikhachov
- 1996: Serhiy Osovych
- 1997: Vladyslav Dolohodin
- 1998: Anatoliy Dovhal
- 1999: Kostyantyn Rurak
- 2000: Kostyantyn Rurak
- 2001: Anatoliy Dovhal
- 2002: Kostyantyn Rurak
- 2003: Kostyantyn Rurak
- 2004: Anatoliy Dovhal
- 2005: Anatoliy Dovhal
- 2006: Anatoliy Dovhal

=== 200 metres ===
- 1992: Igor Streltsov
- 1993: Aleksey Chikhachov
- 1994: Aleksey Chikhachov
- 1995: Vladyslav Dolohodin
- 1996: Roman Galkin
- 1997: Vladyslav Dolohodin
- 1998: Sergey Polinkov
- 1999: Serhiy Osovych
- 2000: Sergey Polinkov
- 2001: Anatoliy Dovhal
- 2002: Kostyantyn Rurak
- 2003: Yevhen Zyukov
- 2004: Dmitriy Glushchenko
- 2005: Dmitriy Glushchenko
- 2006: Dmitriy Glushchenko

=== 400 metres ===
- 1992: Ivan Bednenko
- 1993: Vasiliy Lozinskiy
- 1994: Vadim Ogiy
- 1995: Valentin Kulbatskiy
- 1996: Valentin Kulbatskiy
- 1997: Roman Galkin
- 1998: Roman Galkin
- 1999: Roman Voronko
- 2000: Aleksandr Kaydash
- 2001: Yevhen Zyukov
- 2002: Andrey Tverdostup
- 2003: Andrey Tverdostup
- 2004: Andrey Tverdostup
- 2005: Andrey Tverdostup
- 2006: Yevhen Zyukov

=== 800 metres ===
- 1992: Andrey Chernkolpakov
- 1993: Andrey Mitin
- 1994: Andrey Buzhenko
- 1995: Anatoliy Yakimovich
- 1996: Anatoliy Yakimovich
- 1997: Yevgeniy Karlash
- 1998: Andrey Shokur
- 1999: Andrey Bulkovskiy
- 2000: Anatoliy Yakimovich
- 2001: Vladimir Kovalik
- 2002: Ivan Heshko
- 2003: Ivan Heshko
- 2004: Andrey Tomylin
- 2005: Ivan Heshko
- 2006: Aleksandr Osmolovych

=== 1500 metres ===
- 1992: Andrey Chernkolpakov
- 1993: Leonid Lyashenko
- 1994: Igor Lischinskiy
- 1995: Andrey Bulkovskiy
- 1996: Andrey Bulkovskiy
- 1997: Igor Lischinskiy
- 1998: Serhiy Lebid
- 1999: Anatoliy Yakimovich
- 2000: Ivan Heshko
- 2001: Ivan Heshko
- 2002: Ivan Heshko
- 2003: Ivan Heshko
- 2004: Ivan Heshko
- 2005: Serhiy Lebid
- 2006: Nikolay Labovskiy

=== 5000 metres ===
- 1992: Valeriy Chesak
- 1993: Yevgeniy Sirotin
- 1994: Valeriy Chesak
- 1995: Serhiy Lebid
- 1996: Serhiy Lebid
- 1997: Igor Lischinskiy
- 1998: Maksim Yanishevskiy
- 1999: Serhiy Lebid
- 2000: Serhiy Lebid
- 2001: Serhiy Lebid
- 2002: Dmytro Baranovskyy
- 2003: Serhiy Lebid
- 2004: Serhiy Lebid
- 2005: Vasiliy Matviychuk
- 2006: Yevgeniy Bozhko

=== 10,000 metres ===
- 1992: Leonid Nasedkin
- 1993: Viktor Karpenko
- 1994: Valeriy Chesak
- 1995: Valeriy Chesak
- 1996: Anatoliy Zeruk
- 1997: Andriy Naumov
- 1998: Sergey Rusetskiy
- 1999: Andrey Gladishev
- 2000: Yuriy Gychun
- 2001: Nikolay Rudik
- 2002: Mikhail Iveryuk
- 2003: Serhiy Lebid
- 2004: Vasiliy Matviychuk
- 2005: Vasiliy Matviychuk
- 2006: Mikhail Iveryuk

=== 20K run ===
- 2006: Oleksandr Kuzin

=== Half marathon ===
- 1999: Igor Osmak
- 2000: ?
- 2001: ?
- 2002: ?
- 2003: Nikolay Rudik
- 2004: Vasiliy Matviychuk

=== Marathon ===
- 1994: Pavel Vasilenko
- 1995: ?
- 1996: ?
- 1997: ?
- 1998: ?
- 1999: ?
- 2000: ?
- 2001: ?
- 2002: ?
- 2003: Aleksandr Golovnitskiy
- 2004: Sergey Kryzhko

=== 3000 metres steeplechase ===
- 1992: Aleksey Patserin
- 1993: Aleksey Patserin
- 1994: Aleksey Patserin
- 1995: Ivan Tvardovskiy
- 1996: Aleksey Patserin
- 1997: Sergey Redko
- 1998: Sergey Redko
- 1999: Sergey Redko
- 2000: Sergey Redko
- 2001: Sergey Redko
- 2002: Vadym Slobodenyuk
- 2003: Vadym Slobodenyuk
- 2004: Vadym Slobodenyuk
- 2005: Vadym Slobodenyuk
- 2006: Vadym Slobodenyuk

=== 110 metres hurdles ===
- 1992: Vladimir Belokon
- 1993: Vladimir Belokon
- 1994: Vladimir Belokon
- 1995: Vladimir Belokon
- 1996: Vladimir Belokon
- 1997: Dmitriy Kolesnichenko
- 1998: Dmitriy Kolesnichenko
- 1999: Dmitriy Kolesnichenko
- 2000: Denis Kozhemyakin
- 2001: Sergey Smolenskiy
- 2002: Vladimir Ovcharov
- 2003: Serhiy Demydyuk
- 2004: Serhiy Demydyuk
- 2005: Serhiy Demydyuk
- 2006: Serhiy Demydyuk

=== 400 metres hurdles ===
- 1992: Vyacheslav Orinchuk
- 1993: Igor Kurochkin (BLR)
- 1994: Hennadiy Horbenko
- 1995: Hennadiy Horbenko
- 1996: Andrey Kleymenov
- 1997: Vadim Zadoinov (MDA)
- 1998: Roman Voronko
- 1999: Hennadiy Horbenko
- 2000: Hennadiy Horbenko
- 2001: Hennadiy Horbenko
- 2002: Hennadiy Horbenko
- 2003: Hennadiy Horbenko
- 2004: Hennadiy Horbenko
- 2005: Hennadiy Horbenko
- 2006: Denis Grishchuk

=== High jump ===
- 1992: Yuriy Sergiyenko
- 1993: Viacheslav Tyrtyshnik
- 1994: Yuriy Sergiyenko
- 1995: Sergey Kolesnik
- 1996: Viacheslav Tyrtyshnik
- 1997: Oleg Vorobey (BLR)
- 1998: Viacheslav Tyrtyshnik
- 1999: Serhiy Dymchenko
- 2000: Andriy Sokolovskyy
- 2001: Andriy Sokolovskyy
- 2002: Ruslan Glivinskiy
- 2003: Andriy Sokolovskyy
- 2004: Andriy Sokolovskyy
- 2005: Yuriy Krymarenko
- 2006: Andriy Sokolovskyy

=== Pole vault ===
- 1992: Sergey Yesipchuk
- 1993: Aleksandr Chernyayev
- 1994: Vasiliy Bubka
- 1995: Vyacheslav Shuteyev
- 1996: Vasiliy Bubka
- 1997: Vyacheslav Shuteyev
- 1998: Vyacheslav Shuteyev
- 1999: Denys Yurchenko
- 2000: Denys Yurchenko
- 2001: Ruslan Yeremenko
- 2002: Denys Yurchenko
- 2003: Denys Yurchenko
- 2004: Ruslan Yeremenko
- 2005: Oleksandr Korchmid
- 2006: Denys Yurchenko

=== Long jump ===
- 1992: Sergey Layevskiy
- 1993: Vitaliy Kyrylenko
- 1994: Vitaliy Kyrylenko
- 1995: Vitaliy Kyrylenko
- 1996: Oleksy Lukashevych
- 1997: Vitaliy Kyrylenko
- 1998: Roman Shchurenko
- 1999: Roman Shchurenko
- 2000: Oleksy Lukashevych
- 2001: Volodymyr Zyuskov
- 2002: Volodymyr Zyuskov
- 2003: Volodymyr Zyuskov
- 2004: Volodymyr Zyuskov
- 2005: Volodymyr Zyuskov
- 2006: Oleksy Lukashevych

=== Triple jump ===
- 1992: Ilya Yashchuk
- 1993: Volodymyr Inozemtsev
- 1994: Vladimir Kravchenko
- 1995: Viktor Popko
- 1996: Sergey Izmailov
- 1997: Yuriy Osipenko
- 1998: Vitaliy Kolpakov
- 1999: Sergey Izmailov
- 2000: Sergey Izmailov
- 2001: Vladimir Kravchenko
- 2002: Mykola Savolaynen
- 2003: Mykola Savolaynen
- 2004: Viktor Yastrebov
- 2005: Viktor Yastrebov
- 2006: Mykola Savolaynen

=== Shot put ===
- 1992: Aleksandr Klimenko
- 1993: Andriy Nemchaninov
- 1994: Oleksandr Bagach
- 1995: Oleksandr Bagach
- 1996: Andriy Nemchaninov
- 1997: Oleksandr Bagach
- 1998: Oleksandr Bagach
- 1999: Oleksandr Bagach
- 2000: Roman Virastyuk
- 2001: Yuriy Bilonoh
- 2002: Roman Virastyuk
- 2003: Yuriy Bilonoh
- 2004: Roman Virastyuk
- 2005: Yuriy Bilonoh
- 2006: Yuriy Bilonoh

=== Discus throw ===
- 1992: Volodymyr Zinchenko
- 1993: Volodymyr Zinchenko
- 1994: Volodymyr Zinchenko
- 1995: Vitaliy Sidorov
- 1996: Vitaliy Sidorov
- 1997: Vitaliy Sidorov
- 1998: Vitaliy Sidorov
- 1999: Yuriy Bilonoh
- 2000: Kirill Chuprinin
- 2001: Yuriy Bilonoh
- 2002: Abbas Samimi (IRI)
- 2003: Yuriy Bilonoh
- 2004: Kirill Chuprinin
- 2005: Kirill Chuprinin
- 2006: Yuriy Bilonoh

=== Hammer throw ===
- 1992: Andriy Skvaruk
- 1993: Vadim Kolesnikov
- 1994: Andriy Skvaruk
- 1995: Andriy Skvaruk
- 1996: Andriy Skvaruk
- 1997: Vadim Kolesnikov
- 1998: Vladyslav Piskunov
- 1999: Vladyslav Piskunov
- 2000: Vladyslav Piskunov
- 2001: Andriy Skvaruk
- 2002: Oleksandr Krykun
- 2003: Andriy Skvaruk
- 2004: Artem Rubanko
- 2005: Andriy Skvaruk
- 2006: Ihor Tuhay

=== Javelin throw ===
- 1992: Andrey Maznichenko
- 1993: Andrey Novikov
- 1994: Andrey Maznichenko
- 1995: Andrey Uglov
- 1996: Andrey Uglov
- 1997: Andrey Maznichenko
- 1998: Sergey Volochay
- 1999: Yuriy Drozdov
- 2000: Oleg Statsenko
- 2001: Oleg Statsenko
- 2002: Oleg Statsenko
- 2003: Oleg Statsenko
- 2004: Oleg Statsenko
- 2005: Oleg Statsenko
- 2006: Roman Avramenko

=== Decathlon ===
- 1992: Vitaliy Kolpakov
- 1993: Vitaliy Kolpakov
- 1994: Sergey Blonskiy
- 1995: Sergey Blonskiy
- 1996: Viktor Dvlyakh
- 1997: Vladimir Mikhaylenko
- 1998: Vladimir Mikhaylenko
- 1999: Yuriy Zhuravskiy
- 2000: Fyodor Laukhin
- 2001: Sergey Blonskiy
- 2002: ?
- 2003: Fyodor Laukhin
- 2004: Oleksandr Yurkov
- 2005: Yuriy Blonskiy
- 2006: Nikolay Shulga

=== 20 kilometres walk ===
The 1993 and 1998 championships races were held on a track.

- 1992: K. Gornev
- 1993: Viktor Mostovik (MDA)
- 1994: Anatoliy Kozlov
- 1995: Pavel Andriyenko
- 1996: Nikolay Kalitka
- 1997: Andrey Kovenko
- 1998: Andrey Kovenko
- 1999: ?
- 2000: Aleksey Shelest
- 2001: Aleksey Shelest
- 2002: Andrey Yurin
- 2003: Aleksey Shelest
- 2004: Andrey Yurin
- 2005: Andrey Kovenko
- 2006: Andrey Yurin

=== 30 kilometres walk ===
- 1997: Vitaliy Popovich

=== 50 kilometres walk ===
- 1993: Vitaliy Popovich
- 1994: Vitaliy Popovich
- 1995: Vitaliy Popovich
- 1996: ?
- 1997: ?
- 1998: ?
- 1999: Aleksey Shelest
- 2000: ?
- 2001: ?
- 2002: Aleksey Shelest
- 2003: Aleksey Shelest
- 2004: Aleksey Shelest
- 2005: Aleksey Shelest

== Women ==
=== 100 metres ===
- 1992: Anzhelika Shevchuk
- 1993: Irina Slyusar
- 1994: Zhanna Pintusevich-Block
- 1995: Zhanna Pintusevich-Block
- 1996: Iryna Pukha
- 1997: Anzhela Kravchenko
- 1998: Anzhela Kravchenko
- 1999: Anzhela Kravchenko
- 2000: Anzhela Kravchenko
- 2001: Anzhela Kravchenko
- 2002: Anzhela Kravchenko
- 2003: Yelena Pastushenko
- 2004: Irina Kozhemyakina
- 2005: Irina Shtanhyeyeva
- 2006: Natalya Pogrebnyak

=== 200 metres ===
- 1992: Yelena Nasonkina
- 1993: Irina Slyusar
- 1994: Viktoriya Fomenko
- 1995: Viktoriya Fomenko
- 1996: Viktoriya Fomenko
- 1997: Anzhela Kravchenko
- 1998: Tetyana Bonenko
- 1999: Tatyana Tkalich
- 2000: Yelena Pastushenko
- 2001: Tatyana Tkalich
- 2002: Anzhela Kravchenko
- 2003: Maryna Maydanova
- 2004: Maryna Maydanova
- 2005: Maryna Maydanova
- 2006: Elena Chebanu

=== 400 metres ===
- 1992: Yelena Nasonkina
- 1993: Yelena Nasonkina
- 1994: Lyudmila Koshchev
- 1995: Yelena Rurak
- 1996: Olha Moroz
- 1997: Tatyana Movchan
- 1998: Yelena Rurak
- 1999: Irina Misiruk
- 2000: Yelena Rurak
- 2001: Olga Mishchenko
- 2002: Antonina Yefremova
- 2003: Antonina Yefremova
- 2004: Antonina Yefremova
- 2005: Antonina Yefremova
- 2006: Oksana Shcherbak

=== 800 metres ===
- 1992: Yelena Storchovaya
- 1993: Yelena Zavadskaya
- 1994: Yelena Zavadskaya
- 1995: Inna Yevseyeva
- 1996: Lyudmila Koshchev
- 1997: Oksana Ilyushkina
- 1998: Yelena Buzhenko
- 1999: Iryna Lishchynska
- 2000: Yelena Buzhenko
- 2001: Galina Misiruk
- 2002: Yuliya Krevsun
- 2003: Tamara Volkova
- 2004: Tetiana Petlyuk
- 2005: Nelya Neporadna
- 2006: Nataliya Tobias

=== 1500 metres ===
- 1992: Tatyana Pozdnyakova
- 1993: ?
- 1994: Yelena Storchovaya
- 1995: Svetlana Miroshnik
- 1996: Svetlana Miroshnik
- 1997: Tatyana Belovol
- 1998: Yelena Gorodnicheva
- 1999: Yelena Gorodnicheva
- 2000: Tatyana Krivobok
- 2001: Iryna Lishchynska
- 2002: Iryna Lishchynska
- 2003: Iryna Lishchynska
- 2004: Iryna Lishchynska
- 2005: Tatyana Krivobok
- 2006: Tetyana Holovchenko

=== 3000 metres ===
- 1992: Svetlana Miroshnik
- 1993: Zoya Kaznovskaya
- 1994: Tatyana Belovol

=== 5000 metres ===
- 1995: Tamara Koba
- 1996: Olena Zhupiyeva-Vyazova
- 1997: Tatyana Belovol
- 1998: Tatyana Belovol
- 1999: Svetlana Nekhorosh
- 2000: Nataliya Berkut
- 2001: Tatyana Belovol
- 2002: Marina Dubrova
- 2003: Nataliya Tobias
- 2004: Maryna Dubrova
- 2005: Maryna Dubrova
- 2006: Nataliya Berkut

=== 10,000 metres ===
- 1992: Natalya Lagunkova
- 1993: Olena Zhupiyeva-Vyazova
- 1994: Nataliya Vorobyova
- 1995: Tatyana Pozdnyakova
- 1996: Olena Zhupiyeva-Vyazova
- 1997: Rimma Dubovik
- 1998: Rimma Dubovik
- 1999: Svetlana Nekhorosh
- 2000: Nataliya Berkut
- 2001: Nataliya Berkut
- 2002: Nataliya Berkut
- 2003: Nataliya Berkut
- 2004: Nataliya Berkut
- 2005: Nataliya Berkut
- 2006: Oksana Sklyarenko

=== 20K run ===
- 2006: Olga Kalendaryova

=== Half marathon ===
- 1999: Yelena Plastinina
- 2000: ?
- 2001: ?
- 2002: ?
- 2003: Marina Dubrova
- 2004: Tatyana Gladyr

=== Marathon ===
- 2003: Tatyana Bulyshchenko
- 2004: Katerina Stetsenko

=== 2000 metres steeplechase ===
- 1992: Svetlana Lyegkodukh
- 1993: ?
- 1994: Olga Kozel
- 1995: Olga Kozel
- 1996: Tatyana Babik
- 1997: Anzhelika Averkova
- 1998: Tatyana Gladyr

=== 3000 metres steeplechase ===
- 2000: Anzhelika Averkova
- 2001: Anzhelika Averkova
- 2002: Anzhelika Averkova
- 2003: Valentina Gorpinich
- 2004: Valeriya Mara
- 2005: Valentina Gorpinich
- 2006: Yuliya Ignatova

=== 100 metres hurdles ===
- 1992: Yelena Politika
- 1993: Nadiya Bodrova
- 1994: Nadiya Bodrova
- 1995: Olena Krasovska
- 1996: Nadiya Bodrova
- 1997: Maya Shemchishina
- 1998: Olena Krasovska
- 1999: Olena Krasovska
- 2000: Olena Krasovska
- 2001: Olena Krasovska
- 2002: Olena Krasovska
- 2003: Olena Krasovska
- 2004: Olena Krasovska
- 2005: Yevgeniya Snigur
- 2006: Yevgeniya Snigur

=== 400 metres hurdles ===
- 1992: Lyudmila Khodasevich
- 1993: Tatyana Kurochkina (BLR)
- 1994: Tetyana Tereshchuk-Antipova
- 1995: Lyudmila Khodasevich
- 1996: Tetyana Tereshchuk-Antipova
- 1997: Tatyana Debelaya
- 1998: Tatyana Debelaya
- 1999: Tetyana Tereshchuk-Antipova
- 2000: Tatyana Debelaya
- 2001: Tetyana Tereshchuk-Antipova
- 2002: Tatyana Debelaya
- 2003: Anastasiya Rabchenyuk
- 2004: Anastasiya Rabchenyuk
- 2005: Anastasiya Rabchenyuk
- 2006: Anastasiya Rabchenyuk

=== High jump ===
- 1992: Inha Babakova
- 1993: Larisa Serebryanskaya
- 1994: Iryna Mykhalchenko
- 1995: Vita Styopina
- 1996: Vita Styopina
- 1997: Iryna Mykhalchenko
- 1998: Iryna Mykhalchenko
- 1999: Vita Styopina
- 2000: Iryna Mykhalchenko
- 2001: Vita Palamar
- 2002: Iryna Mykhalchenko
- 2003: Vita Palamar
- 2004: Vita Styopina
- 2005: Iryna Mykhalchenko
- 2006: Iryna Mykhalchenko

=== Pole vault ===
- 1996: Anzhela Balakhonova
- 1997: Anzhela Balakhonova
- 1998: Lyudmila Prikhodko
- 1999: Anzhela Balakhonova
- 2000: Anzhela Balakhonova
- 2001: Anzhela Balakhonova
- 2002: Yevgeniya Katkova
- 2003: Natalya Kushch-Mazuryk
- 2004: Anzhela Balakhonova
- 2005: Anzhela Balakhonova
- 2006: Alevtina Ruyeva

=== Long jump ===
- 1992: Olena Khlopotnova
- 1993: Larysa Berezhna
- 1994: Yelena Semiraz
- 1995: Olena Khlopotnova
- 1996: Olena Shekhovtsova
- 1997: Olena Shekhovtsova
- 1998: Olena Khlopotnova
- 1999: Viktoriya Vershynina
- 2000: Olena Shekhovtsova
- 2001: Olena Shekhovtsova
- 2002: Olena Shekhovtsova
- 2003: Nataliya Sorokina
- 2004: Viktoriya Molchanova
- 2005: Viktoriya Molchanova
- 2006: Viktoriya Rybalko

=== Triple jump ===
- 1992: Tatyana Olkhovaya
- 1993: Olga Boyko
- 1994: Viktoriya Vershynina
- 1995: Inessa Kravets
- 1996: Olena Hovorova
- 1997: Olena Hovorova
- 1998: Olena Hovorova
- 1999: Olena Hovorova
- 2000: Olena Hovorova
- 2001: Olena Hovorova
- 2002: Olena Hovorova
- 2003: Olena Hovorova
- 2004: Olena Hovorova
- 2005: Aleksandra Shyshlyuk
- 2006: Tetyana Dyachenko

=== Shot put ===
- 1992: Lyudmila Voyevodskaya
- 1993: Vita Pavlysh
- 1994: Valentina Fedyushina
- 1995: Vita Pavlysh
- 1996: Vita Pavlysh
- 1997: Valentina Fedyushina
- 1998: Yelena Dementiy
- 1999: Yelena Dementiy
- 2000: Yelena Dementiy
- 2001: Vita Pavlysh
- 2002: Yelena Dementiy
- 2003: Vita Pavlysh
- 2004: Oksana Zakharchuk
- 2005: Tatyana Nasonova
- 2006: Oksana Zakharchuk

=== Discus throw ===
- 1992: Ilona Zakharchenko
- 1993: Olga Nikishina
- 1994: Olga Nikishina
- 1995: Olena Antonova
- 1996: Olena Antonova
- 1997: Olena Antonova
- 1998: Olena Antonova
- 1999: Olena Antonova
- 2000: Olena Antonova
- 2001: Olena Antonova
- 2002: Olena Antonova
- 2003: Olena Antonova
- 2004: Olena Antonova
- 2005: Olena Antonova
- 2006: Katerina Karsak

=== Hammer throw ===
- 1992: Natalya Vasilenko
- 1993: ?
- 1994: Marina Pirog
- 1995: Natalya Kunitskaya
- 1996: Marina Pirog
- 1997: Natalya Kunitskaya
- 1998: Irina Martynenko
- 1999: Natalya Kunitskaya
- 2000: Irina Sekachova
- 2001: Irina Sekachova
- 2002: Irina Sekachova
- 2003: Irina Sekachova
- 2004: Irina Sekachova
- 2005: Irina Sekachova
- 2006: Irina Sekachova

=== Javelin throw ===
- 1992: Irina Kostyuchenkova
- 1993: Irina Kostyuchenkova
- 1994: Irina Kostyuchenkova
- 1995: Olga Ivankova
- 1996: Olga Ivankova
- 1997: Olga Ivankova
- 1998: Nadezhda Kobrin
- 1999: Kristina Klyshevskaya
- 2000: Nadezhda Kobrin
- 2001: Tatyana Lyakhovich
- 2002: Kristina Klyshevskaya
- 2003: Zhanna Slastina
- 2004: Tatyana Lyakhovich
- 2005: Olga Ivankova
- 2006: Olga Ivankova

=== Heptathlon ===
- 1992: Marina Shcherbina
- 1993: Marina Shcherbina
- 1994: Irina Matyusheva
- 1995: Marina Shcherbina
- 1996: Yuliya Akulenko
- 1997: Marina Shcherbina
- 1998: Lyudmyla Kovalenko
- 1999: Elmira Sokhovtinova
- 2000: Lyudmyla Blonska
- 2001: Marina Bryukhach
- 2002: ?
- 2003: Zhanna Melnychenko
- 2004: Yuliya Akulenko
- 2005: Yuliya Akulenko
- 2006: Marina Bryuhach

=== 10,000 metres walk ===
- 1993: Natalya Serbinenko
- 1994: ?
- 1995: Tatyana Ragozina
- 1996: ?
- 1997: Vira Zozulya
- 1998: Tatyana Ragozina

=== 10 kilometres walk ===
- 1994: Tatyana Ragozina
- 1995: Olga Leonenko
- 1996: Valentina Savchuk
- 1997: Valentina Savchuk

=== 20 kilometres walk ===
- 2000: Vira Zozulya
- 2001: Vira Zozulya
- 2002: Olga Lukyanchuk
- 2003: Vira Zozulya
- 2004: Vira Zozulya
- 2005: Vira Zozulya
- 2006: Nadiya Borovska
