= List of 5000 metres national champions (women) =

Below a list of all National champions in the Women's 5000 metres (track outdoor) in track and field from several countries since 1980. In most countries however the event was contested for the first time in 1995. Until then the 3000 metres was the main middle-distance track event for women.

== Australia ==
- 1995: Carolyn Schuwalow
- 1996: Kate Anderson
- 1997: Kate Anderson
- 1998: Annette Cross
- 1999: Natalie Harvey
- 2000: Annette Cross
- 2001: Elizabeth Miller
- 2002: Hayley McGregor
- 2003: Benita Johnson
- 2004: Georgina Clarke
- 2005: Benita Johnson
- 2006: Eloise Wellings
- 2007: Benita Johnson
- 2008: Georgina Clarke
- 2009: Sarah Jamieson

== Belgium ==
- 1995: Marleen Renders
- 1996: Marleen Renders
- 1997: Anne-Marie Danneels
- 1998: Anne-Marie Danneels
- 1999: Anja Smolders
- 2000: Anja Smolders
- 2001: Stefanija Statkuvienė
- 2002: Mounia Aboulahcen
- 2003: Sigrid Vanden Bempt
- 2004: Fatima Baouf
- 2005: Nathalie DeVos
- 2006: Anja Smolders
- 2007: Sigrid Vanden Bempt
- 2008: Elke Van Hoeymissen
- 2009: Veerle Van linden
- 2010: Sigrid Vanden Bempt
- 2011: Sigrid Vanden Bempt
- 2012: Veerle Van linden
- 2013: Veerle Van linden
- 2014: Veerle Van linden
- 2015: Veerle Van linden
- 2016: Barbara Maveau

== Canada ==
- 1995: Kathy Butler
- 1996: Tina Connelly
- 1997: Carol Howe
- 1998: Sherri Smith
- 1999: Kathy Butler
- 2000: Tina Connelly
- 2001: Courtney Babcock
- 2002: Courtney Babcock
- 2003: Sean Kaley
- 2004: Emilie Mondor
- 2005: Emilie Mondor
- 2006: Megan Metcalfe
- 2007: Megan Metcalfe
- 2008: Megan Metcalfe
- 2009: Tara Quinn

== Denmark ==
- 1995: Nina Christiansen
- 1996: Nina Christiansen
- 1997: Anja Jørgensen
- 1998: Dorte Vibjerg
- 1999: Annemette Jensen
- 2000: Annemette Jensen
- 2001: Gitte Karlshøj
- 2002: Gitte Karlshøj
- 2003: Dorte Vibjerg
- 2004: Louise Brasen
- 2005: Gitte Karlshøj
- 2006: Louise Mørch
- 2007: Maria Sig Møller
- 2008: Maria Sig Møller
- 2009: Lisbeth Pedersen

== England ==
- 1980: Susan Hutton
- 1981: Kathryn Binns
- 1982: Monica Joyce
- 1983: Paula Fudge
- 1984: Shireen Samy-Barbour
- 1985: Monica Joyce
- 1986: Marina Samy
- 1987: Catherine Newman
- 1988: Jane Shields
- 1989: Sue Crehan
- 1990: Sally Ellis
- 1991: Amanda Wright
- 1992: Amanda Wright
- 1993: Suzanne Rigg
- 1994: Shireen Samy-Barbour
- 1995: Alison Wyeth
- 1996: Paula Radcliffe
- 1997: Andrea Whitcombe
- 1998: Andrea Whitcombe
- 1999: Sarah Wilkinson
- 2000: Paula Radcliffe
- 2001: Joanne Pavey
- 2002: Hayley Yelling
- 2003: Hayley Yelling
- 2004: Joanne Pavey
- 2005: Joanne Pavey
- 2006: Hayley Yelling
- 2007: Joanne Pavey
- 2008: Joanne Pavey
- 2009: Charlotte Purdue

== Estonia ==
- 1999: Liilia Kesküla
- 2000: Külli Kaljus
- 2001: Kadri Kelve
- 2002: Kadri Kelve
- 2003: Kadri Kelve
- 2004: Kadri Kelve
- 2005: Jekaterina Patjuk
- 2006: Jekaterina Patjuk
- 2007: Jekaterina Patjuk
- 2008: Jekaterina Patjuk
- 2009: Jekaterina Patjuk
- 2010: Jekaterina Patjuk
- 2011: Annika Rihma
- 2012: Jekaterina Patjuk
- 2013: Jekaterina Patjuk
- 2014: Jekaterina Patjuk
- 2015: Jekaterina Patjuk
- 2016: Egle-Helene Ervin
- 2017: Jekaterina Patjuk
- 2018: Lily Luik
- 2019: Liina Tšernov
- 2020: Jekaterina Patjuk
- 2021: Jekaterina Patjuk

== Finland ==
- 1995: Annemari Sandell
- 1996: Päivi Tikkanen
- 1997: Tuula Laitinen
- 1998: Päivi Tikkanen
- 1999: Annemari Sandell
- 2000: Annemari Sandell
- 2001: Elina Lindgren
- 2002: Ulla Tuimala
- 2003: Kirsi Valasti
- 2004: Kirsi Valasti
- 2005: Annemari Sandell
- 2006: Ulla Tuimala
- 2007: Elina Lindgren
- 2008: Annemari Sandell-Hyvärinen
- 2009: Annemari Sandell-Hyvärinen
- 2010: Sandra Eriksson
- 2011: Heidi Eriksson
- 2012: Sandra Eriksson
- 2013: Minna Lamminen
- 2014: Johanna Peiponen

== France ==
- 1995: Rosario Murcia
- 1996: Farida Fates
- 1997: Zahia Dahmani
- 1998: Blandine Bitzner
- 1999: Fatima Yvelain
- 2000: Fatima Yvelain
- 2001: Fatima Yvelain
- 2002: Fatima Yvelain
- 2003: Christelle Daunay
- 2004: Christelle Daunay
- 2005: Margaret Maury
- 2006: Christine Bardelle
- 2007: Christine Bardelle
- 2008: Saadia Bourgaih
- 2009: Christine Bardelle

== Germany ==
- 1995: Uta Pippig
- 1996: Petra Wassiluk
- 1997: Kristina Wollheim
- 1998: Kristina Wollheim
- 1999: Irina Mikitenko
- 2000: Irina Mikitenko
- 2001: Sabrina Mockenhaupt
- 2002: Sabrina Mockenhaupt
- 2003: Sabrina Mockenhaupt
- 2004: Sabrina Mockenhaupt
- 2005: Sabrina Mockenhaupt
- 2006: Irina Mikitenko
- 2007: Sabrina Mockenhaupt
- 2008: Sabrina Mockenhaupt
- 2009: Sabrina Mockenhaupt
- 2010: Sabrina Mockenhaupt
- 2011: Sabrina Mockenhaupt
- 2012: Sabrina Mockenhaupt
- 2013: Sabrina Mockenhaupt
- 2014: Sabrina Mockenhaupt
- 2015: Alina Reh

== Italy ==
- 1995: Silvia Sommaggio
- 1996: Roberta Brunet
- 1997: Lucilla Andreucci
- 1998: Elisa Rea
- 1999: Elisa Rea
- 2000: Roberta Brunet
- 2001: Elisa Rea
- 2002: Gloria Marconi
- 2003: Agata Balsamo
- 2004: Gloria Marconi
- 2005: Silvia Weissteiner
- 2006: Silvia Weissteiner
- 2007: Claudia Pinna
- 2008: Elena Romagnolo
- 2009: Federica Dal Ri
- 2010: Federica Dal Ri
- 2011: Silvia Weissteiner
- 2012: Silvia Weissteiner
- 2013: Giulia Viola
- 2014: Giulia Viola
- 2015: Silvia Weissteiner
- 2016: Veronica Inglese
- 2017: Valeria Roffino
- 2018: Nadia Battocletti

== Japan ==
- 1995: Atsumi Yashima
- 1996: Yoshiko Ichikawa
- 1997: Yoshiko Ichikawa
- 1998: Michiko Shimizu
- 1999: Yoshiko Ichikawa
- 2000: Yoshiko Fujinaga
- 2001: Haruko Okamoto
- 2002: Kayoko Fukushi
- 2003: Mari Ozaki
- 2004: Kayoko Fukushi
- 2005: Kayoko Fukushi
- 2006: Kayoko Fukushi
- 2007: Kayoko Fukushi
- 2008: Yuriko Kobayashi
- 2009: Yurika Nakamura

== Latvia ==
- 1994: Tatjana Ribakova
- 1995: Jeļena Čelnova
- 1996: Jeļena Čelnova
- 1997: Jeļena Čelnova
- 1998: Inna Masjunas
- 1999: Inna Masjunas
- 2000: Jeļena Prokopčuka
- 2001: Inâra Lûse
- 2002: Jeļena Prokopčuka
- 2003: Inna Poluškina
- 2004: Inna Poluškina
- 2005: Jeļena Prokopčuka
- 2006: Svetlana Ivanova
- 2007: ???
- 2008: Agnese Pastare
- 2009: Agnese Pastare
- 2010: Inna Poluškina

== Netherlands ==
- 1995: Grete Koens
- 1996: Christine Toonstra
- 1997: Silvia Kruijer
- 1998: Erika van de Bilt
- 1999: Wilma van Onna
- 2000: Erika van de Bilt
- 2001: Vivian Ruijters
- 2002: Nadezhda Wijenberg
- 2003: Miranda Boonstra
- 2004: Anita Looper
- 2005: Anita Looper
- 2006: Anita Looper
- 2007: Selma Borst
- 2008: Ilse Pol
- 2009: Lesley van Miert
- 2010: Marieke Falkmann
- 2011: Ilse Pol
- 2012: Lesley van Miert
- 2013: Helen Hofstede
- 2014: Jip Vastenburg
- 2015: Jamie van Lieshout
- 2016: Susan Kuijken

== New Zealand ==
- 1986: Debbie Elsmore
- 1987: Anne Audain
- 1988: Sonia Barry
- 1989: Anne Hannam
- 1990: Anne Hare
- 1991: Anne Hare
- 1992: Sharon Clode
- 1993: Linden Wilde
- 1994: Anne Hare
- 1995: Anne Hare
- 1996: Nyla Carroll
- 1997: Linden Wilde
- 1998: Nyla Carroll
- 1999: Melissa Moon
- 2000: Sarah Christie
- 2001: Melissa Moon
- 2002: Kim Smith
- 2003: Nyla Carroll
- 2004: Nina Rillstone
- 2005: Melissa Moon
- 2006: Kim Smith
- 2007: Belinda Wimmer
- 2008: Kim Smith
- 2009: Rachel Kingsford
- 2010: Jessica Ruthe
- 2011: Kellie Palmer
- 2012: Hannah Newbould
- 2013: Becky Wade (USA)
- 2014: Camille Buscomb
- 2015: Camille Buscomb
- 2016: Camille Buscomb

== Norway ==
- 1982: Ingrid Kristiansen
- 1983: Mona Kleppe
- 1984: Mona Kleppe
- 1985: Grete Kirkeberg
- 1986: Grete Kirkeberg
- 1987: Anita Håkenstad
- 1988: Grethe Fosse
- 1989: Ingrid Kristiansen
- 1990: Sissel Grottenberg
- 1991: Ingrid Kristiansen
- 1992: Grete Kirkeberg
- 1993: Torhild Dybwad
- 1994: Not Held
- 1995: Not Held
- 1996: Gunhild Halle Haugen
- 1997: Gunhild Halle Haugen
- 1998: Susanne Wigene
- 1999: Gunhild Halle Haugen
- 2000: Gunhild Halle Haugen
- 2001: Gunhild Halle Haugen
- 2002: Gunhild Halle Haugen
- 2003: Bente Landøy
- 2004: Susanne Wigene
- 2005: Susanne Wigene
- 2006: Kirsten Otterbu
- 2007: Ingunn Opsal
- 2008: Karoline Bjerkeli Grøvdal
- 2009: Kristen Størmer

== Poland ==
- 1984: Renata Kokowska
- 1985: Wanda Panfil
- 1986: Renata Kokowska
- 1987: Wanda Panfil
- 1988: Wanda Panfil
- 1989: Wanda Panfil
- 1990: Grażyna Kowina
- 1991–1994: Not Held
- 1995: Dorota Gruca
- 1996: Danuta Marczyk
- 1997: Justyna Bąk
- 1998: Dorota Gruca
- 1999: Dorota Gruca
- 2000: Justyna Bąk
- 2001: Justyna Bąk
- 2002: Wioletta Janowska
- 2003: Grażyna Syrek
- 2004: Wioletta Janowska
- 2005: Justyna Bąk
- 2006: Grażyna Syrek
- 2007: Wioletta Janowska
- 2008: Wioletta Janowska
- 2009: Karolina Jarzyńska
- 2010: Wioletta Frankiewicz (Janowska)
- 2011: Lidia Chojecka
- 2012: Wioletta Frankiewicz (Janowska)
- 2013: Karolina Jarzyńska
- 2014: Justyna Korytkowska
- 2015: Renata Pliś
- 2016: Katarzyna Kowalska
- 2017: Katarzyna Rutkowska
- 2018: Paulina Kaczyńska
- 2019: Katarzyna Jankowska (Rutkowska)

== Portugal ==
- 1995: Conceição Ferreira
- 1996: Marina Bastos Rodrigues
- 1997: Marina Bastos Rodrigues
- 1998: Marina Bastos Rodrigues
- 1999: Marina Bastos Rodrigues
- 2000: Fernanda Ribeiro
- 2001: Ana Dias
- 2002: Fernanda Ribeiro
- 2003: Fernanda Ribeiro
- 2004: Fernanda Ribeiro
- 2005: Inês Monteiro
- 2006: Jessica Augusto
- 2007: Cláudia Pereira
- 2008: Carla Martinho
- 2009: Ana Dias
- 2010: Dulce Félix
- 2011: Dulce Félix
- 2012: Ana Mafalda Ferreira

== Russia ==
- 1993: Tatyana Pentukova
- 1994: Klara Kachapova
- 1995: Viktoriya Nenasheva
- 1996: Viktoriya Nenasheva
- 1997: Elena Kopytova
- 1998: Svetlana Baygulova
- 1999: Olga Yegorova
- 2000: Tatyana Tomasheva
- 2001: Olga Rosseyeva
- 2002: Liliya Shobukhova
- 2003: Gulnara Samitova
- 2004: Gulnara Samitova
- 2005: Liliya Shobukhova
- 2006: Regina Rakhimkulova
- 2007: Yekaterina Volkova
- 2008: Liliya Shobukhova
- 2009: Mariya Konovalova

== South Africa ==
- 1995: Juliet Prowse
- 1996: Alta Verster
- 1997: Alta Verster
- 1998: Alta Verster
- 1999: Carlien Cornelissen
- 2000: René Kalmer
- 2001: René Kalmer
- 2002: Rika Feuth
- 2003: Poppy Mlambo
- 2004: René Kalmer
- 2005: Poppy Mlambo
- 2006: Zintle Xiniwe
- 2007: René Kalmer
- 2008: René Kalmer
- 2009: Dinah-Lebo Phalula

== Spain ==
- 1982: Pilar Fernández
- 1983: Pilar Fernández
- 1984: Ana Isabel Alonso
- 1985: Amelia Lorza
- 1986: María Carmen Valero
- 1987: Asunción Sinobas
- 1988: Angelines Rodriguez
- 1989: Estela Estévez
- 1990: Estela Estévez
- 1991: Estela Estévez
- 1992: Estela Estévez
- 1993: Julia Vaquero
- 1994: Rocío Ríos
- 1995: Maria Teresa Recio
- 1996: Julia Vaquero
- 1997: Cristina Maria Petite
- 1998: Marta Domínguez
- 1999: Marta Domínguez
- 2000: Marta Domínguez
- 2001: Marta Domínguez
- 2002: Marta Domínguez
- 2003: Marta Domínguez
- 2004: María Luisa Larraga
- 2005: Yesenia Centeno
- 2006: Judit Pla
- 2007: Marta Romo
- 2008: Dolores Checa
- 2009: Judit Pla
- 2010: Judit Pla
- 2011: Dolores Checa
- 2012: Nuria Fernández

== Ukraine ==
- 1992: not contested
- 1993: not contested
- 1994: not contested
- 1995: Tamara Koba
- 1996: Olena Vyazova
- 1997: Tetyana Bilovol
- 1998: Tetyana Bilovol
- 1999: Svetlana Nekhorosh
- 2000: Nataliya Berkut
- 2001: Tetyana Bilovol
- 2002: Maryna Dubrova
- 2003: Nataliya Sidorenko
- 2004: Maryna Dubrova
- 2005: Maryna Dubrova
- 2006: Nataliya Berkut
- 2007: Tetyana Holovchenko
- 2008: Tetyana Holovchenko
- 2009: Tetyana Holovchenko
- 2010: Tetyana Holovchenko
- 2011: Olha Skrypak
- 2012: Hanna Nosenko
- 2013: Viktoriya Pohoryelska
- 2014: Hanna Nosenko
- 2015: Valentyna Zhudina
- 2016: Viktoriya Pohoryelska
- 2017: Yuliya Shmatenko
- 2018: Olena Serdyuk
- 2019: Viktoriya Kalyuzhna
- 2020: Yuliya Shmatenko

== United States ==
- 1983: Judi St Hilaire
- 1984: Katie Ishmael
- 1985: Suzanne Girard
- 1986: Betty Jo Geiger
- 1987: Nanette Davis
- 1988: Brenda Webb
- 1989: Melinda Schmidt
- 1990: PattiSue Plumer
- 1991: PattiSue Plumer
- 1992: Christine Boyd
- 1993: Christine McNamara
- 1994: Cecilia St Geme
- 1995: Gina Procaccio
- 1996: Lynn Jennings
- 1997: Libbie Hickman
- 1998: Regina Jacobs
- 1999: Regina Jacobs
- 2000: Regina Jacobs
- 2001: Marla Runyan
- 2002: Marla Runyan
- 2003: Marla Runyan
- 2004: Shayne Culpepper
- 2005: Shalane Flanagan
- 2006: Lauren Fleshman
- 2007: Shalane Flanagan
- 2008: Kara Goucher
- 2009: Kara Goucher
- 2010: Lauren Fleshman
- 2011: Molly Huddle
- 2012: Julie Culley
- 2013: Jennifer Simpson
- 2014: Molly Huddle
- 2015: Nicole Tully
- 2016: Molly Huddle
- 2017: Shelby Houlihan
- 2018: Shelby Houlihan
- 2019: Shelby Houlihan
- 2021: Elise Cranny
- 2022: Elise Cranny
- 2023: Elise Cranny
- 2024: Elle St. Pierre
- 2025: Shelby Houlihan

== See also ==
- List of 5000 metres national champions (men)
