= 2002 European Cup Super League =

Rugby tournament

These are the full results of the 2002 European Cup Super League which was held on 22 and 23 June 2002 at the Parc des Sports in Annecy, France.

== Final standings ==
Men
| Pos. | Nation | Points |
|---|---|---|
| 1 | Germany | 109 |
| 2 | France | 107 |
| 3 | Russia | 96 |
| 4 | Great Britain | 95 |
| 5 | Italy | 91.5 |
| 6 | Poland | 87 |
| 7 | Ukraine | 64.5 |
| 8 | Finland | 61 |

Women
| Pos. | Nation | Points |
|---|---|---|
| 1 | Russia | 122.5 |
| 2 | Germany | 103 |
| 3 | France | 89 |
| 4 | Romania | 88 |
| 5 | Great Britain | 80.5 |
| 6 | Poland | 75.5 |
| 7 | Ukraine | 73.5 |
| 8 | Italy | 73 |

== Men's results ==
=== 100 metres ===
22 June
Wind: +0.2 m/s

| Rank | Name | Nationality | Time | Notes | Points |
|---|---|---|---|---|---|
| ~~1~~ | Dwain Chambers | Great Britain | ~~10.04~~ | Doping | 0 |
| 1 | Issa-Aimé Nthépé | France | 10.27 | | 8 |
| 2 | Kostyantyn Rurak | Ukraine | 10.31 | | 7 |
| 3 | Francesco Scuderi | Italy | 10.35 | | 6 |
| 4 | Marcin Urbaś | Poland | 10.42 | | 5 |
| 5 | Marc Blume | Germany | 10.44 | | 4 |
| 6 | Markus Pöyhönen | Finland | 10.46 | | 3 |
| 7 | Andrey Yepishin | Russia | 10.49 | | 2 |

=== 200 metres ===
23 June
Wind: -0.4 m/s

| Rank | Name | Nationality | Time | Notes | Points |
|---|---|---|---|---|---|
| 1 | Marlon Devonish | Great Britain | 20.27 | | 8 |
| 2 | Marcin Urbaś | Poland | 20.45 | | 7 |
| 3 | Marco Torrieri | Italy | 20.65 | | 6 |
| 4 | Kostyantyn Rurak | Ukraine | 20.75 | PB | 5 |
| 5 | Ronald Pognon | France | 20.79 | | 4 |
| 6 | Oleg Sergeyev | Russia | 20.98 | SB | 3 |
| 7 | Steffen Otto | Germany | 21.06 | | 2 |
| 8 | Stefan Koivikko | Finland | 21.13 | | 1 |

=== 400 metres ===
22 June

| Rank | Name | Nationality | Time | Notes | Points |
|---|---|---|---|---|---|
| 1 | Daniel Caines | Great Britain | 45.14 | | 8 |
| 2 | Ingo Schultz | Germany | 45.33 | | 7 |
| 3 | Marek Plawgo | Germany | 45.35 | PB | 6 |
| 4 | Marc Raquil | France | 45.39 | SB | 5 |
| 5 | Alessandro Attene | Italy | 45.91 | SB | 4 |
| 6 | Volodymyr Demchenko | Ukraine | 46.11 | SB | 3 |
| 7 | Oleg Mishukov | Russia | 46.61 | | 2 |
| 8 | Ari Kauppinen | Finland | 47.69 | SB | 1 |

=== 800 metres ===
23 June

| Rank | Name | Nationality | Time | Notes | Points |
|---|---|---|---|---|---|
| 1 | Yuriy Borzakovskiy | Russia | 1:46.58 | | 8 |
| 2 | Nils Schumann | Germany | 1:46.99 | | 7 |
| 3 | Paweł Czapiewski | Poland | 1:47.92 | | 6 |
| 4 | Nicolas Aïssat | France | 1:48.01 | | 5 |
| 5 | Simon Lees | Germany | 1:48.43 | | 4 |
| 6 | Wilson Kirwa | Finland | 1:48.52 | | 3 |
| 7 | Christian Neunhäuserer | Italy | 1:48.61 | | 2 |
| 8 | Ivan Heshko | Ukraine | 1:49.68 | | 1 |

=== 1500 metres ===
22 June

| Rank | Name | Nationality | Time | Notes | Points |
|---|---|---|---|---|---|
| 1 | Mehdi Baala | France | 3:47.21 | | 8 |
| 2 | Michael East | Great Britain | 3:48.26 | | 7 |
| 3 | Paweł Czapiewski | Poland | 3:48.77 | SB | 6 |
| 4 | Franek Haschke | Germany | 3:48.81 | | 5 |
| 5 | Ivan Heshko | Ukraine | 3:48.91 | | 4 |
| 6 | Vyacheslav Shabunin | Russia | 3:48.97 | | 3 |
| 7 | Christian Obrist | Italy | 3:50.22 | | 2 |
| 8 | Juha Kukkamo | Finland | 3:50.41 | | 1 |

=== 3000 metres ===
23 June

| Rank | Name | Nationality | Time | Notes | Points |
|---|---|---|---|---|---|
| 1 | Driss Maazouzi | France | 7:53.41 | | 8 |
| 2 | Mikhail Yeginov | Russia | 7:54.05 | | 7 |
| 3 | Jan Fitschen | Germany | 7:54.92 | | 6 |
| 4 | Anthony Whiteman | Great Britain | 8:00.31 | | 5 |
| 5 | Simone Zanon | Italy | 8:03.28 | | 4 |
| 6 | Zbigniew Graczyk | Poland | 8:16.68 | SB | 3 |
| 7 | Mykola Novytskyy | Ukraine | 8:17.38 | SB | 2 |
| 8 | Tuomo Lehtinen | Finland | 8:42.15 | | 1 |

=== 5000 metres ===
22 June

| Rank | Name | Nationality | Time | Notes | Points |
|---|---|---|---|---|---|
| 1 | Dmitriy Maksimov | Russia | 14:09.92 | SB | 8 |
| 2 | Sam Haughian | Great Britain | 14:11.60 | | 7 |
| 3 | Ismaïl Sghyr | France | 14:14.00 | | 6 |
| 4 | Marco Mazza | Italy | 14:14.72 | | 5 |
| 5 | Samuli Vasala | Finland | 14:16.63 | | 4 |
| 6 | Mario Krockert | Germany | 14:22.60 | | 3 |
| 7 | Dmytro Baranovskyy | Ukraine | 14:43.27 | | 2 |
| 8 | Dariusz Kruczkowski | Poland | 15:02.78 | | 1 |

=== 110 metres hurdles ===
23 June
Wind: +0.7 m/s

| Rank | Name | Nationality | Time | Notes | Points |
|---|---|---|---|---|---|
| 1 | Colin Jackson | Great Britain | 13.15 | | 8 |
| 2 | Mike Fenner | Germany | 13.33 | SB | 7 |
| 3 | Andrea Giaconi | Italy | 13.35 | NR | 6 |
| 4 | Artur Kohutek | Poland | 13.53 | | 5 |
| 5 | Cédric Lavanne | France | 13.64 | | 4 |
| 6 | Matti Niemi | Finland | 13.72 | | 3 |
| 7 | Andrey Kislykh | Russia | 13.77 | | 2 |
| 8 | Sergiy Smolenskyy | Ukraine | 14.04 | | 1 |

=== 400 metres hurdles ===
22 June

| Rank | Name | Nationality | Time | Notes | Points |
|---|---|---|---|---|---|
| 1 | Fabrizio Mori | Italy | 48.41 | | 8 |
| 2 | Stéphane Diagana | France | 48.45 | | 7 |
| 3 | Chris Rawlinson | Great Britain | 48.87 | | 6 |
| 4 | Paweł Januszewski | Poland | 49.20 | | 5 |
| 5 | Boris Gorban | Russia | 49.22 | | 4 |
| 6 | Henning Hackelbusch | Germany | 50.60 | | 3 |
| 7 | Hennadiy Horbenko | Ukraine | 51.16 | | 2 |
| 8 | Jussi Heikkilä | Finland | 51.49 | | 1 |

=== 3000 metres steeplechase ===
23 June

| Rank | Name | Nationality | Time | Notes | Points |
|---|---|---|---|---|---|
| 1 | Bouabdellah Tahri | France | 8:30.22 | | 8 |
| 2 | Damian Kallabis | Germany | 8:32.04 | | 7 |
| 3 | Roman Usov | Russia | 8:34.10 | | 6 |
| 4 | Kim Bergdahl | Finland | 8:35.31 | | 5 |
| 5 | Angelo Iannelli | Italy | 8:36.47 | | 4 |
| 6 | Rafał Wójcik | Poland | 8:44.86 | | 3 |
| 7 | Stuart Stokes | Great Britain | 8:48.69 | | 2 |
| 8 | Serhiy Redko | Ukraine | 9:02.19 | | 1 |

=== 4 × 100 metres relay ===
22 June

| Rank | Nation | Athletes | Time | Note | Points |
|---|---|---|---|---|---|
| 1 | Great Britain | Marlon Devonish, Mark Lewis-Francis, Christian Malcolm, Allyn Condon | 38.65 | | 8 |
| 2 | Germany | Ronny Ostwald, Alexander Kosenkow, Marc Blume, Thomas Müller | 38.88 | | 7 |
| 3 | Italy | Francesco Scuderi, Alessandro Cavallaro, Marco Torrieri, Stefano Dacastello | 38.89 | | 6 |
| 4 | Poland | Piotr Balcerzak, Marcin Jędrusiński, Marcin Urbaś, Zbigniew Tulin | 39.08 | | 5 |
| 5 | Russia | Andrey Yepishin, Sergey Blinov, Aleksandr Ryabov, Aleksandr Smirnov | 39.10 | | 4 |
| 6 | France | Ronald Pognon, Issa-Aimé Nthépé, Yannick Urbino, David Patros | 39.16 | | 3 |
| | Ukraine | Kostyantyn Vasyukov, Kostyantyn Rurak, Anatoliy Dovhal, Oleksandr Kaydash | DQ | | 0 |
| | Finland | Ville Laine, Tuomas Nasi, Stefan Koivikko, Markus Pöyhönen | DNF | | 0 |

=== 4 × 400 metres relay ===
23 June

| Rank | Nation | Athletes | Time | Note | Points |
|---|---|---|---|---|---|
| 1 | Great Britain | Jared Deacon, Tim Benjamin, Jamie Baulch, Daniel Caines | 3:00.57 | | 8 |
| 2 | Germany | Ingo Schultz, Jens Dautzenberg, Ruwen Faller, Bastian Swillims | 3:00.80 | | 7 |
| 3 | France | Leslie Djhone, Stéphane Diagana, Naman Keïta, Marc Raquil | 3:00.92 | | 6 |
| 4 | Russia | Yevgeniy Lebedev, Ruslan Mashchenko, Boris Gorban, Andrey Semyonov | 3:00.93 | | 5 |
| 5 | Poland | Marcin Marciniszyn, Paweł Januszewski, Rafał Wieruszewski, Artur Gąsiewski | 3:01.99 | | 4 |
| 6 | Ukraine | Volodymyr Demchenko, Andriy Tverdostup, Volodymyr Rybalka, Yevhen Zyukov | 3:05.97 | | 3 |
| 7 | Italy | Edoardo Vallet, Luca Galletti, Andrea Barberi, Alessandro Attene | 3:06.01 | | 2 |
| 8 | Finland | Ari Kauppinen, Mikko Karppi, Petri Pohjonen, Wilson Kirwa | 3:07.16 | | 1 |

=== High jump ===
22 June

| Rank | Name | Nationality | 2.10 | 2.15 | 2.19 | 2.22 | 2.25 | 2.28 | 2.30 | 2.32 | 2.34 | Result | Notes | Points |
|---|---|---|---|---|---|---|---|---|---|---|---|---|---|---|
| 1 | Grégory Gabella | France | o | xo | xxo | xo | o | o | o | – | xx | 2.30 | PB | 8 |
| 2 | Yaroslav Rybakov | Russia | – | – | – | o | o | xxo | x– | xx | | 2.28 | | 7 |
| 3 | Grzegorz Sposób | Poland | o | – | o | – | o | xxx | | | | 2.25 | | 6 |
| 4 | Andriy Sokolovskyy | Ukraine | o | o | o | xo | o | xxx | | | | 2.25 | | 5 |
| 5 | Toni Huikuri | Finland | xo | o | – | xo | o | xr | | | | 2.25 | | 4 |
| 6 | Giulio Ciotti | Italy | o | o | o | o | xo | xxx | | | | 2.25 | | 3 |
| 7 | Martin Buß | Germany | – | – | o | o | xxx | | | | | 2.22 | | 2 |
| 8 | Ben Challenger | Great Britain | o | o | xo | xxx | | | | | | 2.19 | | 1 |

=== Pole vault ===
23 June

| Rank | Name | Nationality | 4.85 | 5.05 | 5.25 | 5.40 | 5.55 | 5.65 | 5.75 | 5.91 | Result | Notes | Points |
|---|---|---|---|---|---|---|---|---|---|---|---|---|---|
| 1 | Tim Lobinger | Germany | – | – | – | o | o | xxo | o | xxx | 5.75 | | 8 |
| 2 | Giuseppe Gibilisco | Italy | – | – | – | o | o | xo | xxx | | 5.65 | | 6.5 |
| 2 | Denys Yurchenko | Ukraine | – | – | o | o | o | xo | xxx | | 5.65 | | 6.5 |
| 4 | Vasiliy Gorshkov | Russia | – | – | – | xo | xo | xxx | | | 5.55 | | 5 |
| 5 | Vesa Rantanen | Finland | – | – | o | o | xxx | | | | 5.40 | | 4 |
| 6 | Tim Thomas | Great Britain | o | xo | xxx | | | | | | 5.05 | | 3 |
| 7 | Przemysław Czerwiński | Poland | o | xxx | | | | | | | 4.85 | | 2 |
| | Jean Galfione | France | – | – | xxx | | | | | | NM | | 0 |

=== Long jump ===
22 June

| Rank | Name | Nationality | #1 | #2 | #3 | #4 | Result | Notes | Points |
|---|---|---|---|---|---|---|---|---|---|
| 1 | Chris Tomlinson | Great Britain | 8.17 | 8.16w | 7.72w | 8.14 | 8.17 | | 8 |
| 2 | Nicola Trentin | Italy | 8.15 | 7.91 | 7.86 | x | 8.15 | SB | 7 |
| 3 | Salim Sdiri | France | 7.83 | 7.66 | 8.03 | x | 8.03 | | 6 |
| 4 | Danila Burkenya | Russia | 7.75 | 7.84 | 7.84 | 7.94 | 7.94 | | 5 |
| 5 | Schahriar Bigdeli | Germany | x | x | x | 7.82 | 7.82 | | 4 |
| 6 | Kenneth Kastrén | Finland | x | 7.77 | x | x | 7.77 | SB | 3 |
| 7 | Grzegorz Marciniszyn | Poland | 7.42 | 7.50 | x | 7.53 | 7.53 | | 2 |
| | Volodymyr Zyuskov | Ukraine | x | x | x | x | NM | | 0 |

=== Triple jump ===
23 June

| Rank | Name | Nationality | #1 | #2 | #3 | #4 | Result | Notes | Points |
|---|---|---|---|---|---|---|---|---|---|
| 1 | Jonathan Edwards | Great Britain | 17.19 | x | 17.08 | – | 17.19 | | 8 |
| 2 | Fabrizio Donato | Italy | 17.17 | 17.11 | x | 17.02 | 17.17 | SB | 7 |
| 3 | Charles Michael Friedek | Germany | 17.10 | x | x | 17.11 | 17.11 | | 6 |
| 4 | Julien Kapek | France | 16.41 | x | x | 17.04 | 17.04 | SB | 5 |
| 5 | Igor Spasovkhodskiy | Russia | 16.55w | 14.38 | x | 17.01 | 17.01 | | 4 |
| 6 | Jacek Kazimierowski | Poland | 15.96 | 16.51 | x | 16.67w | 16.67w | | 3 |
| 7 | Andriy Trots | Ukraine | 16.49 | x | x | x | 16.49 | | 2 |
| 8 | Johan Meriluoto | Finland | x | 16.11 | 14.06 | 16.16 | 16.16 | | 1 |

=== Shot put ===
22 June

| Rank | Name | Nationality | #1 | #2 | #3 | #4 | Result | Notes | Points |
|---|---|---|---|---|---|---|---|---|---|
| 1 | Yuriy Bilonoh | Ukraine | 20.23 | 20.36 | 20.55 | x | 20.55 | | 8 |
| 2 | Ville Tiisanoja | Finland | 20.10 | 20.04 | 20.29 | 20.28 | 20.29 | | 7 |
| 3 | Paolo Dal Soglio | Italy | 19.83 | x | 19.52 | 19.87 | 19.87 | | 6 |
| 4 | Ralf Bartels | Germany | 18.17 | 19.39 | x | 19.85 | 19.85 | | 5 |
| 5 | Yves Niaré | France | 19.00 | 18.63 | 18.80 | 19.48 | 19.48 | | 4 |
| 6 | Carl Myerscough | Great Britain | 19.18 | 19.41 | 19.39 | x | 19.41 | | 3 |
| 7 | Pavel Chumachenko | Russia | x | x | 19.21 | 19.37 | 19.37 | | 2 |
| 8 | Leszek Śliwa | Poland | 18.15 | 18.73 | 18.71 | 18.55 | 18.73 | | 1 |

=== Discus throw ===
23 June

| Rank | Name | Nationality | #1 | #2 | #3 | #4 | Result | Notes | Points |
|---|---|---|---|---|---|---|---|---|---|
| 1 | Michael Möllenbeck | Germany | 64.87 | 61.72 | x | 66.82 | 66.82 | | 8 |
| 2 | Dmitriy Shevchenko | Russia | x | 57.02 | 62.03 | 61.33 | 62.03 | | 7 |
| 3 | Olgierd Stański | Poland | 59.68 | x | 60.88 | 57.73 | 60.88 | | 6 |
| 4 | Timo Tompuri | Finland | 59.33 | 56.24 | 58.42 | 59.79 | 59.79 | | 5 |
| 5 | Jean-Claude Retel | France | 57.69 | 59.05 | 57.90 | 55.74 | 59.05 | | 4 |
| 6 | Cristiano Andrei | Italy | x | 57.72 | 58.09 | 59.00 | 59.00 | | 3 |
| 7 | Kyrylo Chuprynin | Ukraine | 53.50 | x | 58.43 | 57.60 | 58.43 | | 2 |
| 8 | Glen Smith | Great Britain | 53.76 | 54.77 | x | 54.68 | 54.77 | | 1 |

=== Hammer throw ===
22 June

| Rank | Name | Nationality | #1 | #2 | #3 | #4 | Result | Notes | Points |
|---|---|---|---|---|---|---|---|---|---|
| 1 | Olli-Pekka Karjalainen | Finland | 76.17 | 78.52 | 79.25 | x | 79.25 | | 8 |
| 2 | Andriy Skvaruk | Ukraine | 76.70 | x | 79.04 | x | 79.04 | | 7 |
| 3 | Maciej Pałyszko | Poland | 75.67 | 78.25 | 75.91 | 76.60 | 78.25 | | 6 |
| 4 | Nicolas Figère | France | 77.75 | 76.88 | 74.40 | x | 77.75 | | 5 |
| 5 | Karsten Kobs | Germany | 73.67 | 77.51 | 77.63 | 77.60 | 77.63 | | 4 |
| 6 | Vadim Khersontsev | Russia | x | 71.00 | 77.10 | x | 77.10 | | 3 |
| 7 | Nicola Vizzoni | Italy | x | 73.07 | 73.84 | 73.23 | 73.84 | | 2 |
| 8 | Mick Jones | Great Britain | 69.19 | 70.08 | 69.90 | 69.60 | 70.08 | | 1 |

=== Javelin throw ===
23 June

| Rank | Name | Nationality | #1 | #2 | #3 | #4 | Result | Notes | Points |
|---|---|---|---|---|---|---|---|---|---|
| 1 | Sergey Makarov | Russia | 88.24 | 86.28 | 87.66 | 87.48 | 88.24 | | 8 |
| 2 | Steve Backley | Great Britain | 81.00 | 85.03 | 81.20 | x | 85.03 | | 7 |
| 3 | Boris Henry | Germany | 80.20 | 83.90 | 83.58 | 81.57 | 83.90 | | 6 |
| 4 | Harri Haatainen | Finland | x | 83.25 | x | x | 83.25 | | 5 |
| 5 | Dariusz Trafas | Poland | 79.56 | 78.28 | 80.13 | 77.05 | 80.13 | | 4 |
| 6 | Oleg Statsenko | Ukraine | x | 69.49 | x | 69.73 | 69.73 | | 3 |
| 7 | Dominique Pause | France | 65.21 | x | x | 68.25 | 68.25 | | 2 |
| 8 | Alberto Desiderio | Italy | 67.06 | 65.62 | 64.68 | x | 67.06 | | 1 |

== Women's results ==
=== 100 metres ===
22 June
Wind: +0.4 m/s

| Rank | Name | Nationality | Time | Notes | Points |
|---|---|---|---|---|---|
| 1 | Muriel Hurtis | France | 10.96 | PB | 8 |
| 2 | Manuela Levorato | Italy | 11.20 | SB | 7 |
| 3 | Yuliya Tabakova | Russia | 11.24 | | 6 |
| 4 | Sina Schielke | Germany | 11.25 | | 5 |
| 5 | Anzhela Kravchenko | Ukraine | 11.31 | SB | 4 |
| 6 | Shani Anderson | Great Britain | 11.38 | | 3 |
| 7 | Beata Szkudlarz | Poland | 11.44 | | 2 |
| 8 | Evelina Lisenco | Romania | 11.58 | | 1 |

=== 200 metres ===
23 June
Wind: +0.6 m/s

| Rank | Name | Nationality | Time | Notes | Points |
|---|---|---|---|---|---|
| 1 | Muriel Hurtis | France | 22.51 | | 8 |
| 2 | Manuela Levorato | Italy | 22.76 | | 7 |
| 3 | Sina Schielke | Germany | 22.91 | SB | 6 |
| 4 | Vernicha James | Great Britain | 22.94 | | 5 |
| 5 | Ionela Târlea | Romania | 23.04 | SB | 4 |
| 6 | Yuliya Tabakova | Russia | 23.11 | | 3 |
| 7 | Anzhela Kravchenko | Ukraine | 23.32 | | 2 |
| 8 | Beata Szkudlarz | Poland | 23.83 | | 1 |

=== 400 metres ===
22 June

| Rank | Name | Nationality | Time | Notes | Points |
|---|---|---|---|---|---|
| 1 | Antonina Yefremova | Ukraine | 50.70 | SB | 8 |
| 2 | Grażyna Prokopek | Poland | 51.34 | SB | 7 |
| 3 | Francine Landre | France | 51.78 | SB | 6 |
| 4 | Otilia Ruicu | Romania | 51.79 | SB | 5 |
| 5 | Danielle Perpoli | Italy | 51.85 | SB | 4 |
| 6 | Helen Karagounis | Great Britain | 52.03 | | 3 |
| 7 | Anna Tkach | Russia | 52.09 | | 2 |
| 8 | Claudia Marx | Germany | 52.45 | | 1 |

=== 800 metres ===
22 June

| Rank | Name | Nationality | Time | Notes | Points |
|---|---|---|---|---|---|
| 1 | Irina Mistyukevich | Russia | 1:59.76 | | 8 |
| 2 | Elisabeth Grousselle | France | 1:59.95 | | 7 |
| 3 | Ivonne Teichmann | Germany | 2:00.07 | | 6 |
| 4 | Kelly Holmes | Great Britain | 2:00.33 | | 5 |
| 5 | Elena Iagar | Romania | 2:01.67 | | 4 |
| 6 | Yuliya Gurtovenko | Ukraine | 2:02.04 | | 3 |
| 7 | Anna Jakubczak | Poland | 2:04.25 | | 2 |
| 8 | Claudia Salvarani | Italy | 2:06.65 | | 1 |

=== 1500 metres ===
23 June

| Rank | Name | Nationality | Time | Notes | Points |
|---|---|---|---|---|---|
| 1 | Maria Cioncan | Romania | 4:03.74 | | 8 |
| 2 | Lidia Chojecka | Poland | 4:04.84 | SB | 7 |
| 3 | Tatyana Tomashova | Russia | 4:05.14 | | 6 |
| 4 | Helen Pattinson | Great Britain | 4:05.20 | | 5 |
| 5 | Iryna Lishchynska | Ukraine | 4:10.95 | | 4 |
| 6 | Maria Martins | France | 4:15.04 | | 3 |
| 7 | Sara Palmas | Italy | 4:18.44 | | 2 |
| 8 | Kathleen Friedrich | Germany | 4:20.73 | | 1 |

=== 3000 metres ===
22 June

| Rank | Name | Nationality | Time | Notes | Points |
|---|---|---|---|---|---|
| 1 | Gabriela Szabo | Romania | 8:38.03 | | 8 |
| 2 | Yelena Zadorozhnaya | Russia | 8:39.84 | SB | 7 |
| 3 | Lidia Chojecka | Poland | 8:49.95 | | 6 |
| 4 | Kristina Da Fonseca-Wollheim | Germany | 9:07.40 | SB | 5 |
| 5 | Kathy Butler | Great Britain | 9:09.36 | | 4 |
| 6 | Gloria Marconi | Italy | 9:11.37 | SB | 3 |
| 7 | Marina Dubrova | Ukraine | 9:23.53 | | 2 |
| 8 | Yamna Belkacem | France | 9:52.60 | SB | 1 |

=== 5000 metres ===
23 June

| Rank | Name | Nationality | Time | Notes | Points |
|---|---|---|---|---|---|
| 1 | Olga Yegorova | Russia | 16:04.26 | | 8 |
| 2 | Jo Pavey | Great Britain | 16:06.65 | | 7 |
| 3 | Fatima Yvelain | France | 16:08.21 | | 6 |
| 4 | Sabrina Mockenhaupt | Germany | 16:09.55 | | 5 |
| 5 | Maura Viceconte | Italy | 16:12.24 | | 4 |
| 6 | Mihaela Botezan | Romania | 16:19.39 | | 3 |
| 7 | Marzena Michalska | Poland | 16:46.91 | | 2 |
| 8 | Maryna Dubrova | Ukraine | 16:56.35 | | 1 |

=== 100 metres hurdles ===
23 June
Wind: -0.2 m/s

| Rank | Name | Nationality | Time | Notes | Points |
|---|---|---|---|---|---|
| 1 | Patricia Girard | France | 12.64 | SB | 8 |
| 2 | Kirsten Bolm | France | 12.64 | | 7 |
| 3 | Mariya Koroteyeva | Russia | 12.94 | SB | 6 |
| 4 | Diane Allahgreen | Great Britain | 13.11 | | 5 |
| 5 | Olena Krasovska | Ukraine | 13.12 | | 4 |
| 6 | Aurelia Trywiańska | Poland | 13.12 | | 3 |
| 7 | Carmen Ghilase | Romania | 13.24 | | 2 |
| 8 | Margaret Macchiut | Italy | 13.24 | | 1 |

=== 400 metres hurdles ===
22 June

| Rank | Name | Nationality | Time | Notes | Points |
|---|---|---|---|---|---|
| 1 | Yuliya Pechonkina-Nosova | Russia | 53.38 | CR | 8 |
| 2 | Anna Olichwierczuk | Poland | 55.11 | SB | 7 |
| 3 | Tasha Danvers | Great Britain | 55.68 | SB | 6 |
| 4 | Sylvanie Morandais | France | 55.75 | SB | 5 |
| 5 | Ulrike Urbansky | Germany | 56.20 | SB | 4 |
| 6 | Tatyana Debela | Ukraine | 56.33 | SB | 3 |
| 7 | Monika Niederstätter | Italy | 56.60 | | 2 |
| 8 | Medina-Elena Tudor | Romania | 1:00.05 | | 1 |

=== 3000 metres steeplechase ===
23 June

| Rank | Name | Nationality | Time | Notes | Points |
|---|---|---|---|---|---|
| 1 | Justyna Bąk | Poland | 9:43.38 | | 8 |
| 2 | Cristina Casandra-Iloc | Romania | 9:49.51 | | 7 |
| 3 | Melanie Schulz | Germany | 9:49.79 | | 6 |
| 4 | Tara Krzywicki | Great Britain | 10:23.21 | SB | 5 |
| 5 | Pierangela Baronchelli | Italy | 10:24.49 | | 4 |
| 6 | Yuliya Ignatova | Ukraine | 10:26.24 | | 3 |
| 7 | Yekaterina Volkova | Russia | 10:37.78 | SB | 2 |
| | Laurence Duquenoy | France | DNF | | 0 |

=== 4 × 100 metres relay ===
22 June

| Rank | Nation | Athletes | Time | Note | Points |
|---|---|---|---|---|---|
| 1 | France | Patricia Girard, Muriel Hurtis, Sylviane Félix, Odiah Sidibé | 42.41 | SB | 8 |
| 2 | Germany | Melanie Paschke, Gabriele Rockmeier, Sina Schielke, Marion Wagner | 42.49 | SB | 7 |
| 3 | Russia | Natalya Ignatova, Irina Khabarova, Marina Kislova, Yuliya Tabakova | 43.11 | SB | 6 |
| 4 | Ukraine | Olena Pastushenko, Tetyana Tkalich, Nataliya Pygyda, Maryna Maydanova | 43.51 | | 5 |
| 5 | Italy | Daniela Bellanova, Daniela Gragila, Francesca Cola, Manuela Levorato | 44.24 | | 4 |
| 6 | Poland | Beata Szkudlarz, Joanna Niełacna, Agnieszka Rysiukiewicz, Daria Onyśko | 44.54 | | 3 |
| 7 | Romania | Monika Bumbescu, Mirela Gavris, Evelina Lisenco, Nadia Cocoranu | 45.22 | SB | 2 |
| | Great Britain | Joice Maduaka, Shani Anderson, Amanda Forrester, Vernicha James | DNF | | 0 |

=== 4 × 400 metres relay ===
23 June

| Rank | Nation | Athletes | Time | Note | Points |
|---|---|---|---|---|---|
| 1 | Great Britain | Catherine Murphy, Helen Frost, Helen Karagounis, Lee McConnell | 3:27.87 | | 8 |
| 2 | Germany | Nicole Marahrens, Claudia Marx, Birgit Rockmeier, Florence Ekpo-Umoh | 3:28.72 | | 7 |
| 3 | Italy | Daniela Reina, Daniela Graglia, Manuela Levorato, Danielle Perpoli | 3:29.14 | | 6 |
| 4 | Romania | Ioana Ciurila, Otilia Ruicu, Monika Bumbescu, Ionela Târlea | 3:29.97 | | 5 |
| | Poland | Anna Pacholak, Grażyna Prokopek, Zuzanna Radecka, Aneta Lemiesz | DQ | | 0 |
| | France | Francine Landre, Solene Desert, Elisabeth Grousselle, Marie-Louise Bévis | DQ | | 0 |
| | Russia | Anna Tkach, Olesya Zykina, Natalya Lavshuk, Yuliya Pechonkina-Nosova | DQ | | 0 |
| | Ukraine | Tetyana Movchan, Olga Mishchenko, Nataliya Makukh, Nataliya Zhuravlyova | DQ | | 0 |

=== High jump ===
23 June

| Rank | Name | Nationality | 1.70 | 1.75 | 1.80 | 1.84 | 1.87 | 1.90 | 1.93 | 1.95 | 1.98 | Result | Notes | Points |
|---|---|---|---|---|---|---|---|---|---|---|---|---|---|---|
| 1 | Iryna Myhalchenko | Ukraine | – | – | o | o | o | o | xo | xxo | x | 1.95 | | 8 |
| 2 | Oana Pantelimon | Romania | – | – | o | o | xxo | xxo | o | xxx | | 1.93 | | 7 |
| 3 | Kathryn Holinski | Germany | – | – | o | o | xo | xo | xo | xxx | | 1.93 | PB | 6 |
| 4 | Susan Jones | Great Britain | – | – | o | o | o | o | xxx | | | 1.90 | | 4.5 |
| 4 | Marina Kuptsova | Russia | – | o | o | o | o | o | xxx | | | 1.90 | | 4.5 |
| 5 | Lucie Finez | France | – | o | o | o | o | xxo | xxx | | | 1.90 | =PB | 3 |
| 7 | Antonietta Di Martino | Italy | – | o | o | o | o | xxx | | | | 1.87 | SB | 1.5 |
| 7 | Anna Ksok | Poland | o | o | o | o | o | xxx | | | | 1.87 | | 1.5 |

=== Pole vault ===
22 June

| Rank | Name | Nationality | 3.85 | 4.00 | 4.10 | 4.20 | 4.30 | 4.40 | 4.45 | 4.50 | 4.60 | 4.65 | 4.70 | 4.82 | Result | Notes | Points |
|---|---|---|---|---|---|---|---|---|---|---|---|---|---|---|---|---|---|
| 1 | Svetlana Feofanova | Russia | – | – | – | – | – | o | – | o | xx– | o | xo | xxx | 4.70 | CR | 8 |
| 2 | Yvonne Buschbaum | Germany | – | – | – | – | o | – | – | o | xo | x– | xx | | 4.60 | | 7 |
| 3 | Vanessa Boslak | France | – | o | – | o | xo | xo | o | xxx | | | | | 4.45 | | 6 |
| 4 | Monika Pyrek | Poland | – | o | – | o | – | xxx | | | | | | | 4.20 | | 5 |
| 5 | Janine Whitlock | Great Britain | – | o | o | xxx | | | | | | | | | 4.10 | | 4 |
| 6 | Francesca Dolcini | Italy | o | o | xo | xxx | | | | | | | | | 4.10 | | 2.5 |
| 6 | Nataliya Kushch | Ukraine | o | o | xo | xxx | | | | | | | | | 4.10 | SB | 2.5 |
| | No athlete | Romania | | | | | | | | | | | | | DNS | | 0 |

=== Long jump ===
23 June

| Rank | Name | Nationality | #1 | #2 | #3 | #4 | Result | Notes | Points |
|---|---|---|---|---|---|---|---|---|---|
| 1 | Tatyana Kotova | Russia | 6.78 | x | 7.42 | x | 7.42 | CR, PB | 8 |
| 2 | Cristina Nicolau | Romania | x | x | 6.65 | x | 6.65 | PB | 7 |
| 3 | Bianca Kappler | Germany | 6.24 | x | 6.64 | 5.29 | 6.64 | | 6 |
| 4 | Silvia Favre | Italy | x | 6.45 | 6.44 | 6.08 | 6.45 | SB | 5 |
| 5 | Jade Johnson | Great Britain | 6.42 | x | x | x | 6.42 | | 4 |
| 6 | Katarzyna Klisowska | Poland | 6.35 | 6.41 | 6.20 | 6.14 | 6.41 | PB | 3 |
| 7 | Haïdy Aron | France | 6.19 | 6.38 | 5.86 | 6.14 | 6.38 | | 2 |
| 8 | Olena Shekhovtsova | Ukraine | x | x | 6.11 | 6.06 | 6.11 | | 1 |

=== Triple jump ===
22 June

| Rank | Name | Nationality | #1 | #2 | #3 | #4 | Result | Notes | Points |
|---|---|---|---|---|---|---|---|---|---|
| 1 | Anna Pyatykh | Russia | 14.58 | x | 14.67 | 14.56 | 14.67 | SB | 8 |
| 2 | Ashia Hansen | Great Britain | x | x | 14.62 | x | 14.62 | | 7 |
| 3 | Magdelin Martinez | Italy | x | 14.17 | 14.54 | x | 14.54 | | 6 |
| 4 | Olena Govorova | Ukraine | 13.79 | x | x | 14.37 | 14.37 | | 5 |
| 5 | Cristina Nicolau | Romania | x | x | 14.33 | 14.25 | 14.33 | | 4 |
| 6 | Liliana Zagacka | Poland | 13.21 | 13.77 | 13.42 | 13.68w | 13.77 | | 3 |
| 7 | Roselise Retel | France | 13.63 | 13.32 | x | x | 13.63 | SB | 2 |
| 8 | Nicole Herschmann | Germany | x | 12.69 | 12.76 | 13.30 | 13.30 | | 1 |

=== Shot put ===
23 June

| Rank | Name | Nationality | #1 | #2 | #3 | #4 | Result | Notes | Points |
|---|---|---|---|---|---|---|---|---|---|
| 1 | Svetlana Krivelyova | Russia | 18.86 | 19.41 | 19.63 | 19.56 | 19.63 | | 8 |
| 2 | Astrid Kumbernuß | Germany | 19.02 | 19.61 | x | x | 19.61 | | 7 |
| 3 | Krystyna Zabawska | Poland | 18.01 | 18.52 | x | x | 18.52 | | 6 |
| 4 | Elena Hila | Romania | 17.93 | 17.61 | 17.70 | 17.48 | 17.93 | | 5 |
| 5 | Assunta Legnante | Italy | 16.65 | 17.89 | 17.65 | 17.55 | 17.89 | | 4 |
| 6 | Laurence Manfredi | France | x | 16.31 | 16.52 | 16.26 | 16.52 | | 3 |
| 7 | Olena Dementiy | Ukraine | 15.68 | x | 16.16 | 15.93 | 16.16 | | 2 |
| 8 | Julie Dunkley | Great Britain | 15.40 | 15.73 | 15.32 | 15.85 | 15.85 | | 1 |

=== Discus throw ===
22 June

| Rank | Name | Nationality | #1 | #2 | #3 | #4 | Result | Notes | Points |
|---|---|---|---|---|---|---|---|---|---|
| 1 | Natalya Sadova | Russia | 65.91 | x | 61.84 | 64.25 | 65.91 | | 8 |
| 2 | Nicoleta Grasu | Romania | 60.87 | 59.55 | 59.06 | 63.05 | 63.05 | | 7 |
| 3 | Franka Dietzsch | Germany | 57.49 | 59.30 | x | x | 59.30 | | 6 |
| 4 | Viktoriya Boyko | Ukraine | 51.58 | 58.20 | x | x | 58.20 | | 5 |
| 5 | Joanna Wiśniewska | Poland | 57.63 | x | 58.06 | 57.69 | 58.06 | | 4 |
| 6 | Shelley Newman | Great Britain | 55.58 | 57.89 | 52.55 | 57.27 | 57.89 | | 3 |
| 7 | Agnese Maffeis | Italy | 57.11 | 57.39 | 56.45 | x | 57.39 | | 2 |
| 8 | Melina Robert-Michon | France | 47.36 | 51.50 | 53.94 | 53.17 | 53.94 | | 1 |

=== Hammer throw ===
23 June

| Rank | Name | Nationality | #1 | #2 | #3 | #4 | Result | Notes | Points |
|---|---|---|---|---|---|---|---|---|---|
| 1 | Olga Kuzenkova | Russia | 72.00 | 71.68 | 73.07 | x | 73.07 | SB | 8 |
| 2 | Manuela Montebrun | France | 66.39 | x | 68.53 | 66.73 | 68.53 | | 7 |
| 3 | Iryna Sekachova | Ukraine | 64.87 | 66.18 | 64.68 | 66.88 | 66.88 | | 6 |
| 4 | Ester Balassini | Italy | x | 60.94 | 65.49 | x | 65.49 | | 5 |
| 5 | Susanne Keil | Germany | 64.95 | 65.04 | x | 65.13 | 65.13 | | 4 |
| 6 | Kamila Skolimowska | Poland | x | 64.39 | 64.11 | x | 64.39 | | 3 |
| 7 | Lorraine Shaw | Great Britain | 59.72 | 61.46 | 63.09 | x | 63.09 | | 2 |
| 8 | Cristina Buzău | Romania | 59.08 | 59.82 | 58.14 | 58.93 | 59.82 | | 1 |

=== Javelin throw ===
22 June

| Rank | Name | Nationality | #1 | #2 | #3 | #4 | Result | Notes | Points |
|---|---|---|---|---|---|---|---|---|---|
| 1 | Tatyana Shikolenko | Russia | 64.61 | 61.61 | 62.48 | 64.43 | 64.61 | | 8 |
| 2 | Felicia Moldovan | Romania | 59.96 | 58.08 | 61.59 | x | 61.59 | | 7 |
| 3 | Steffi Nerius | Germany | 57.04 | 59.98 | 57.72 | 56.23 | 59.98 | | 6 |
| 4 | Sarah Walter | France | x | 54.10 | 58.78 | 57.94 | 58.78 | | 5 |
| 5 | Tetyana Lyakhovych | Ukraine | 53.27 | 54.57 | 56.91 | 57.22 | 57.22 | | 4 |
| 6 | Kelly Morgan | Great Britain | 54.67 | 56.55 | 53.40 | 55.06 | 56.55 | | 3 |
| 7 | Ewa Rybak | Poland | 51.15 | 53.03 | 55.67 | 52.21 | 55.67 | | 2 |
| 8 | Claudia Coslovich | Italy | 54.98 | 53.03 | 50.10 | 53.25 | 54.98 | | 1 |
