= 1998 European Cup Super League =

These are the full results of the 1998 European Cup Super League in athletics which was held on 27 and 28 June 1998 at the Petrovsky Stadium in St. Petersburg, Russia.

== Team standings ==
Men
Pos.	Nation	Points
1	Great Britain	111
2	Germany	108.5
3	Russia	102
4	Italy	101
5	France	89.5
6	Czech Republic	87
7	Spain	67.5
8	Finland	52.5

Women
Pos.	Nation	Points
1	Russia	124
2	Germany	108
3	France	93
4	Czech Republic	89
5	Great Britain	81
6	Italy	78
7	Ukraine	64
8	Slovenia	45

== Men's results ==
=== 100 metres ===
27 June
Wind: -0.4 m/s

Rank	Name	Nationality	Time	Notes	Points
1	Stéphane Cali	France	10.32		8
2	Aleksandr Porkhomovskiy	Russia	10.40		7
3	Colin Jackson	Great Britain	10.41		6
4	Carlo Boccarini	Italy	10.59		5
5	Marc Blume	Germany	10.61		4
6	Ivan Šlehobr	Czech Republic	10.61		3
7	Sami Lansivuori	Finland	10.67		2
8	Frutos Feo	Spain	10.71		1

=== 200 metres ===
28 June
Wind: +1.4 m/s

Rank	Name	Nationality	Time	Notes	Points
1	Doug Walker	Great Britain	20.42		8
2	Christophe Cheval	France	20.61		7
3	Alessandro Attene	Italy	20.69		6
4	Martin Morkes	Czech Republic	20.85		5
5	Francisco Navarro	Spain	21.01		4
6	Daniel Bittner	Germany	21.02		3
7	Aleksandr Porkhomovskiy	Russia	21.02		2
8	Janne Hautaniemi	Finland	21.32		1

=== 400 metres ===
27 June

Rank	Name	Nationality	Time	Notes	Points
1	Mark Richardson	Great Britain	45.81		8
2	Jan Podebradský	Czech Republic	46.10		7
3	Dmitriy Golovastov	Russia	46.50		6
4	Marc Foucan	France	46.58		5
5	Marco Vaccari	Italy	46.62		4
6	David Canal	Spain	47.16		3
7	Jens Dautzenberg	Germany	47.50		2
8	Petri Pohjonen	Finland	47.79		1

=== 800 metres ===
28 June

Rank	Name	Nationality	Time	Notes	Points
1	Andrea Longo	Italy	1:45.40		8
2	Lukáš Vydra	Czech Republic	1:45.92		7
3	Andrew Hart	Great Britain	1:46.19		6
4	Wilson Kirwa	Finland	1:46.30		5
5	Sergey Kozhevnikov	Russia	1:46.61		4
6	Nico Motchebon	Germany	1:46.92		3
7	David Divad	France	1:47.14		2
8	Andrés Manuel Díaz	Spain	1:47.14		1

=== 1500 metres ===
27 June

Rank	Name	Nationality	Time	Notes	Points
1	Giuseppe D'Urso	Italy	3:44.58		8
2	Reyes Estévez	Spain	3:44.91		7
3	John Mayock	Great Britain	3:45.09		6
4	Nadir Bosch	France	3:45.12		5
5	Rüdiger Stenzel	Germany	3:45.12		4
6	Lukáš Vydra	Czech Republic	3:45.51		3
7	Vyacheslav Shabunin	Russia	3:46.67		2
8	Juha Kukkamo	Finland	3:48.20		1

=== 3000 metres ===
27 June

Rank	Name	Nationality	Time	Notes	Points
1	Dieter Baumann	Germany	7:41.92		8
2	Manuel Pancorbo	Spain	7:42.24		7
3	Anthony Whiteman	Great Britain	7:43.61		6
4	Abdellah Béhar	France	7:44.59		5
5	Jan Pešava	Czech Republic	7:46.72	NR	4
6	Samuli Vasala	Finland	7:52.97		3
7	Salvatore Vincenti	Italy	7:59.69		2
8	Sergey Drygin	Russia	8:01.65		1

=== 5000 metres ===
28 June

Rank	Name	Nationality	Time	Notes	Points
1	Alberto García	Spain	13:37.45		8
2	Mustapha Essaïd	France	13:37.79		7
3	Stéphane Franke	Germany	13:38.90		6
4	Jan Pešava	Czech Republic	13:45.04		5
5	Vyacheslav Shabunin	Russia	13:57.77		4
6	Karl Keska	Great Britain	13:59.30		3
7	Luciano Di Pardo	Italy	14:18.58		2
8	Santtu Mäkinen	Finland	14:28.63		1

=== 110 metres hurdles ===
28 June
Wind: 0.0 m/s

Rank	Name	Nationality	Time	Notes	Points
1	Colin Jackson	Great Britain	13.17		8
2	Falk Balzer	Germany	13.22		7
3	Jean-Marc Grava	France	13.63		6
4	Emiliano Pizzoli	Italy	13.68		5
5	Sergey Manakov	Russia	13.68		4
6	Tomáš Dvořák	Czech Republic	13.92		3
7	Antti Haapakoski	Finland	14.04		2
8	Carlos Sala	Spain	14.08		1

=== 400 metres hurdles ===
27 June

Rank	Name	Nationality	Time	Notes	Points
1	Ruslan Mashchenko	Russia	48.49		8
2	Fabrizio Mori	Italy	48.57		7
3	Steffen Kolb	Germany	49.43		6
4	Jan Podebradský	Czech Republic	49.66		5
5	Tony Borsumato	Great Britain	49.79		4
6	Petteri Pulkkinen	Finland	50.38		3
7	Jimmy Coco	France	50.48		2
8	Iñigo Monreal	Spain	50.71		1

=== 3000 metres steeplechase ===
28 June

Rank	Name	Nationality	Time	Notes	Points
1	Alessandro Lambruschini	Italy	8:32.96		8
2	André Green	Germany	8:34.21		7
3	Mohamed Belabbes	France	8:35.12		6
4	Vladimir Pronin	Russia	8:38.33		5
5	Alberto Genovés	Spain	8:41.17		4
6	Ben Whitby	Great Britain	8:42.12		3
7	Michael Nejedlý	Czech Republic	8:42.25		2
8	Ville Hautala	Finland	8:42.46		1

=== 4 × 100 metres relay ===
27 June

Rank	Nation	Athletes	Time	Note	Points
1	Great Britain	Allyn Condon, Darren Campbell, Doug Walker, Julian Golding	38.56		8
2	France	Emmanuel Bangué, Frédéric Krantz, Christophe Cheval, Stéphane Cali	38.90		7
3	Russia	Sergey Bychkov, Aleksandr Porkhomovskiy, Andrey Grigoriev, Andrey Fedoriv	39.13		6
4	Italy	Stefano Tilli, Andrea Colombo, Andrea Amici, Carlo Boccarini	39.22		5
5	Germany	Patrick Schneider, Holger Blume, Daniel Bittner, Marc Blume	39.60		4
6	Spain	Frutos Feo, Francisco Navarro, Diego Moisés Santos, Carlos Berlanga	39.60		3
7	Czech Republic	Tomáš Dvořák, Ivan Šlehobr, Martin Morkes, Ivo Krsek	39.67		2
8	Finland	Harri Kivelä, Sami Lansivuori, Ari Pakarinen, Janne Haapasalo	39.69		1

=== 4 × 400 metres relay ===
28 June

Rank	Nation	Athletes	Time	Note	Points
1	Great Britain	Roger Black, Mark Richardson, Jamie Baulch, Iwan Thomas	3:00.95		8
2	Italy	Walter Pirovano, Marco Vaccari, Edoardo Vallet, Fabrizio Mori	3:03.45		7
3	France	Bruno Wavelet, Marc Foucan, Marc Raquil, Fred Mango	3:03.57		6
4	Russia	Boris Gorban, Dmitriy Kosov, Dmitriy Golovastov, Ruslan Mashchenko	3:03.83		5
5	Germany	Klaus Ehrsperger, Alexander Müller, Michael Dragu, Jens Dautzenberg	3:04.49		4
6	Czech Republic	Karel Bláha, Michal Škvára, Jan Štejfa, Jan Podebradský	3:05.69		3
7	Spain	Antonio Andrés, Adrian Fernández, César Martínez, David Canal	3:06.73		2
8	Finland	Petteri Pulkkinen, Tommi Hartonen, Tero Inttila, Petri Pohjonen	3:08.39		1

=== High jump ===
27 June

Rank	Name	Nationality	2.10	2.15	2.20	2.25	2.28	2.30	Result	Notes	Points
1	Sergey Klyugin	Russia	o	o	o	o	xo	xxx	2.28		8
2	Ben Challenger	Great Britain	–	o	xo	xo	xxo	xxx	2.28		7
3	Tomáš Janku	Czech Republic	o	o	o	xo	xxx		2.25		6
4	Ivan Bernasconi	Italy	o	o	o	xxx			2.20		4.5
4	Martin Buß	Germany	–	o	o	xxx			2.20		4.5
6	Arturo Ortiz	Spain	o	xo	o	xxx			2.20		3
7	Didier Detchénique	France	o	o	xxx				2.15		2
8	Mika Polku	Finland	xxo	xxo	xxx				2.15		1

=== Pole vault ===
28 June

Rank	Name	Nationality	5.10	5.30	5.40	5.50	5.60	5.80	5.90	Result	Notes	Points
1	Yevgeniy Smiryagin	Russia	–	o	–	o	xxo	xx–	x	5.60		8
2	Javier García	Spain	–	–	o	xo	xxx			5.50		6.5
2	Heikki Vääräniemi	Finland	–	o	–	xo	xxx			5.50		6.5
4	Danny Ecker	Germany	–	o	–	xxo	xxx			5.50		5
5	Andrea Giannini	Italy	o	o	o	xxx				5.40		3.5
5	Jean Galfione	France	–	–	o	xxx				5.40		3.5
7	Štepán Janácek	Czech Republic	–	–	o	xxx				5.30		2
	Mike Edwards	Great Britain	xxx							NM		0

=== Long jump ===
27 June

Rank	Name	Nationality	#1	#2	#3	#4	Result	Notes	Points
1	Kirill Sosunov	Russia	x	8.38	8.14	x	8.38	=CR	8
2	Milan Kovár	Czech Republic	7.57	x	7.82	8.14	8.14		7
3	Nathan Morgan	Great Britain	7.85	7.76?	7.76?	x	7.93		6
4	Thorsten Heide	Germany	7.63	7.59	x	7.85	7.85		5
5	Paolo Camossi	Italy	7.60	7.71	7.79	7.66	7.79		4
6	Emmanuel Bangué	France	7.75	7.78	x	x	7.78		3
7	Yago Lamela	Spain	7.54	x	7.63	7.75	7.75		2
8	Niklas Rorarius	Finland	7.62	x	7.44	7.47	7.62		1

=== Triple jump ===
28 June

Rank	Name	Nationality	#1	#2	#3	#4	Result	Notes	Points
1	Jonathan Edwards	Great Britain	13.85	17.29	13.82	16.80	17.29		8
2	Jirí Kuntoš	Czech Republic	16.24	16.14	16.43	16.91	16.91		7
3	Hrvoje Verzl	Germany	16.48	16.38	16.74	16.55	16.74		6
4	Raúl Chapado	Spain	16.17	x	16.60	x	16.60		5
5	Johan Meriluoto	Finland	16.44	16.34	15.11	x	16.44		4
6	Colomba Fofana	France	16.40	x	x	x	16.40		3
7	Fabrizio Donato	Italy	16.20	16.32	x	16.25	16.32		2
8	Andrey Kurennoy	Russia	15.95	x	x	x	15.95		1

=== Shot put ===
27 June

Rank	Name	Nationality	#1	#2	#3	#4	Result	Notes	Points
1	Mika Halvari	Finland	20.60	x	20.79	x	20.79		8
2	Oliver-Sven Buder	Germany	19.52	19.97	19.92	x	19.97		7
3	Manuel Martínez	Spain	19.04	19.86	19.26	x	19.86		6
4	Petr Stehlík	Czech Republic	18.29	18.17	x	18.59	18.59		5
5	Corrado Fantini	Italy	18.41	18.28	x	x	18.41		4
6	Mark Proctor	Great Britain	x	x	x	17.98	17.98		3
7	Rocky Vaitanaki	France	16.65	17.67	17.82	x	17.82		2
8	Pavel Chumachenko	Russia	x	x	17.28	x	17.28		1

=== Discus throw ===
28 June

Rank	Name	Nationality	#1	#2	#3	#4	Result	Notes	Points
1	Dmitriy Shevchenko	Russia	62.66	65.14	x	x	65.14		8
2	Jürgen Schult	Germany	63.46	62.87	x	64.37	64.37		7
3	Diego Fortuna	Italy	58.87	60.22	60.96	62.49	62.49		6
4	Robert Weir	Great Britain	59.24	58.81	x	59.75	59.75		5
5	Libor Malina	Czech Republic	58.87	x	58.45	59.29	59.29		4
6	Jean-Claude Retel	France	56.91	56.92	57.67	59.13	59.13		3
7	Harri Uurainen	Finland	54.73	58.57	56.36	55.79	58.57		2
8	José Luis Valencia	Spain	51.35	57.27	x	56.31	57.27		1

=== Hammer throw ===
28 June

Rank	Name	Nationality	#1	#2	#3	#4	Result	Notes	Points
1	Heinz Weis	Germany	77.66	79.15	79.32	79.68	79.68		8
2	Ilya Konovalov	Russia	78.82	78.23	77.59	79.68	79.68		7
3	Enrico Sgrulletti	Italy	77.12	78.13	77.09	x	78.13		6
4	Vladimír Maška	Czech Republic	x	72.57	74.24	x	74.24		5
5	Gilles Dupray	France	70.53	73.06	73.63	72.37	73.63		4
6	Mick Jones	Great Britain	70.92	72.28	71.51	71.81	72.28		3
7	Olli-Pekka Karjalainen	Finland	68.94	x	68.81	x	68.94		2
8	José Manuel Pérez	Spain	x	66.90	65.70	66.70	66.90		1

=== Javelin throw ===
28 June

Rank	Name	Nationality	#1	#2	#3	#4	Result	Notes	Points
1	Boris Henry	Germany	84.77	80.67	80.20	x	84.77		8
2	Sergey Makarov	Russia	81.88	84.37	83.08	82.14	84.37		7
3	Aki Parviainen	Finland	77.89	83.84	84.33	x	84.33		6
4	Mick Hill	Great Britain	76.01	78.59	79.94	83.50	83.50		5
5	Carlo Sonego	Italy	76.09	77.02	71.53	70.49	77.02		4
6	Gaëtan Siakinuu-Schmidt	France	75.58	76.38	72.48	70.58	76.38		3
7	Patrik Landmesser	Czech Republic	62.89	75.25	69.53	74.45	75.25		2
8	Raimundo Fernández	Spain	64.94	66.14	66.35	68.58	68.58		1

== Women's results ==
=== 100 metres ===
27 June
Wind: +1.2 m/s

Rank	Name	Nationality	Time	Notes	Points
1	Irina Privalova	Russia	11.04		8
2	Christine Arron	France	11.14		7
3	Andrea Philipp	Germany	11.26		6
4	Alenka Bikar	Slovenia	11.54		5
5	Tetyana Lukyanenko	Ukraine	11.57		4
6	Marcia Richardson	Great Britain	11.57		3
7	Manuela Levorato	Italy	11.57		2
8	Pavlína Vostatková	Czech Republic	11.62		1

=== 200 metres ===
28 June
Wind: -0.9 m/s

Rank	Name	Nationality	Time	Notes	Points
1	Erika Suchovská	Czech Republic	22.96		8
2	Sylviane Félix	France	22.96		7
3	Melanie Paschke	Germany	22.98		6
4	Yekaterina Leshcheva	Russia	23.06		5
5	Katharine Merry	Great Britain	23.22		4
6	Manuela Levorato	Italy	23.34		3
7	Tetyana Lukyanenko	Ukraine	23.43		2
8	Tina Matul	Slovenia	24.36		1

=== 400 metres ===
27 June

Rank	Name	Nationality	Time	Notes	Points
1	Helena Fuchsová	Czech Republic	51.33		8
2	Irina Rosikhina	Russia	51.48		7
3	Allison Curbishley	Great Britain	51.48		6
4	Uta Rohländer	Germany	51.76		5
5	Patrizia Spuri	Italy	52.65		4
6	Viviane Dorsile	France	53.64		3
7	Iryna Misiruk	Ukraine	54.69		2
8	Brigita Langerholc	Slovenia	54.73		1

=== 800 metres ===
27 June

Rank	Name	Nationality	Time	Notes	Points
1	Larisa Mikhaylova	Russia	1:58.01		8
2	Iryna Lishchynska	Ukraine	1:59.15		7
3	Ludmila Formanová	Czech Republic	1:59.44		6
4	Heike Meißner	Germany	2:00.12		5
5	Patricia Djaté-Taillard	France	2:00.16		4
6	Tanya Blake	Great Britain	2:02.06		3
7	Claudia Salvarani	Italy	2:02.99		2
8	Jolanda Ceplak	Slovenia	2:03.70		1

=== 1500 metres ===
28 June

Rank	Name	Nationality	Time	Notes	Points
1	Olga Komyagina	Russia	4:05.88		8
2	Paula Radcliffe	Great Britain	4:05.92		7
3	Andrea Šuldesová	Czech Republic	4:06.25		6
4	Frédérique Quentin	France	4:10.21		5
5	Sylvia Kühnemund	Germany	4:11.15		4
6	Sara Palmas	Italy	4:12.44		3
7	Sonja Roman	Slovenia	4:14.85		2
8	Natalya Ivanova	Ukraine	4:19.57		1

=== 3000 metres ===
28 June

Rank	Name	Nationality	Time	Notes	Points
1	Olga Yegorova	Russia	9:04.03		8
2	Blandine Bitzner	France	9:06.74		7
3	Luminita Zaituc	Germany	9:10.18		6
4	Elisa Rea	Italy	9:11.54		5
5	Helena Javornik	Slovenia	9:12.13		4
6	Andrea Šuldesová	Czech Republic	9:13.99		3
7	Angela Davies	Great Britain	9:17.03		2
8	Olena Gorodnychova	Ukraine	9:21.62		1

=== 5000 metres ===
27 June

Rank	Name	Nationality	Time	Notes	Points
1	Paula Radcliffe	Great Britain	15:06.87		8
2	Kristina da Fonseca-Wollheim	Germany	15:10.33		7
3	Joalsiae Llado	France	15:17.58		6
4	Helena Javornik	Slovenia	15:27.50		5
5	Maria Pantyukhova	Russia	15:37.82		4
6	Maria Guida	Italy	15:38.68		3
7	Natalya Berkut	Ukraine	15:57.24		2
8	Petra Drajzajtlová	Czech Republic	16:08.71		1

=== 100 metres hurdles ===
28 June
Wind: 0.0 m/s

Rank	Name	Nationality	Time	Notes	Points
1	Brigita Bukovec	Slovenia	12.89		8
2	Patricia Girard	France	12.89		7
3	Tatyana Reshetnikova	Russia	13.06		6
4	Heike Blassneck	Germany	13.22		5
5	Andrea Novotná	Czech Republic	13.36		4
6	Angela Thorp	Great Britain	13.45		3
7	Margaret Macchiut	Italy	13.53		2
8	Tetyana Tereshchuk	Ukraine	13.67		1

=== 400 metres hurdles ===
27 June

Rank	Name	Nationality	Time	Notes	Points
1	Tetyana Tereshchuk	Ukraine	54.15		8
2	Yekaterina Bakhvalova	Russia	54.72		7
3	Silvia Rieger	Germany	54.93		6
4	Florence Delaune	France	57.01		5
5	Victoria Jamison	Great Britain	57.51		4
6	Lara Rocco	Italy	58.02		3
7	Meta Macus	Slovenia	58.42		2
8	Martina Blažková	Czech Republic	59.19		1

=== 4 × 100 metres relay ===
27 June

Rank	Nation	Athletes	Time	Note	Points
1	Russia	Yekaterina Leshcheva, Galina Malchugina, Natalya Voronova, Irina Privalova	42.49		8
2	Germany	Melanie Paschke, Gabi Rockmeier, Birgit Rockmeier, Andrea Philipp	42.59		7
3	France	Patricia Girard, Christine Arron, Linda Ferga, Sylviane Félix	42.61		6
4	Ukraine	Tetyana Debela, Tetyana Lukyanenko, Anzhelika Shevchuk, Iryna Pukha	44.48		5
5	Italy	Anita Pistone, Elena Sordelli, Maria Ruggeri, Manuela Levorato	44.58		4
6	Czech Republic	Hana Benešová, Erika Suchovská, Jitka Burianová, Pavlína Vostatková	45.70		3
7	Slovenia	Alenka Bikar, Brigita Bukovec, Tina Matul, Aleksandra Prokofjev	45.76		2
	Great Britain	Marcia Richardson, Joice Maduaka, Ellena Ruddock, Janine Whitlock	DNF		0

=== 4 × 400 metres relay ===
28 June

Rank	Nation	Athletes	Time	Note	Points
1	Russia	Tatyana Chebykina, Natalya Khrushcheleva, Yekaterina Bakhvalova, Irina Rosikhina	3:25.52		8
2	Czech Republic	Jitka Burianová, Ludmila Formanová, Hana Benešová, Helena Fuchsová	3:28.05		7
3	Great Britain	Donna Fraser, Michelle Thomas, Allison Curbishley, Michelle Pierre	3:28.07		6
4	Italy	Danielle Perpoli, Patrizia Spuri, Francesca Carbone, Virna De Angeli	3:30.14		5
5	France	Francine Landre, Viviane Dorsile, Florence Delaune, Fabienne Ficher	3:30.27		4
6	Germany	Anke Feller, Nicole Marahrens, Martina Breu, Anja Knippel	3:30.36		3
7	Ukraine	Olena Rurak, Iryna Misiruk, Tetyana Debela, Olga Moroz	3:31.60		2
8	Slovenia	Meta Macus, Jolanda Ceplak, Maja Gorjup, Brigita Langerholc	3:40.39		1

=== High jump ===
28 June

Rank	Name	Nationality	1.75	1.80	1.83	1.86	1.89	1.92	1.95	1.98	Result	Notes	Points
1	Zuzana Kováciková	Czech Republic	o	o	xxo	o	o	o			1.98		8
2	Alina Astafei	Germany	–	o	–	xo	o	o	o	xxx	1.95		7
3	Yelena Gulyayeva	Russia	–	o	o	o	o	xxo	xo	xxx	1.95		6
4	Vita Styopina	Ukraine	o	xo	o	o	o	xo	xxx		1.92		5
5	Joanne Jennings	Great Britain	o	o	o	xo	o	xxx			1.89		4
6	Francisca Bradamante	Italy	o	o	–	o	xo	xxx			1.89		3
7	Marie Collonvillé	France	o	xo	o	xo	xo	xxx			1.89		2
8	Britta Bilac	Slovenia	–	o	o	o	xxx				1.86		1

=== Pole vault ===
27 June

Rank	Name	Nationality	3.20	3.40	3.60	3.70	3.80	3.90	4.00	4.10	4.20	4.30	4.35	Result	Notes	Points
1	Daniela Bártová	Czech Republic	–	–	–	–	–	–	o	–	o	–	xo	4.35	CR	8
2	Janine Whitlock	Great Britain	–	–	–	–	–	–	o	xo	o	o	xxx	4.30		7
3	Nicole Rieger	Germany	–	–	–	–	–	–	o	–	o	xxx		4.20		6
4	Lyudmila Prikhodko	Ukraine	–	xo	o	–	o	xxx						3.80		5
5	Caroline Ammel	France	–	–	o	–	xo	–	xxx					3.80		4
6	Francesca Dolcini	Italy	–	–	xxo	–	xxx							3.60		3
7	Teja Melink	Slovenia	o	xo	xxo	xxx								3.60		2
	Yelena Belyakova	Russia	–	–	–	–	xxx							NM		0

=== Long jump ===
28 June

Rank	Name	Nationality	#1	#2	#3	#4	Result	Notes	Points
1	Fiona May	Italy	6.83	x	7.08	x	7.08		8
2	Lyudmila Galkina	Russia	6.55	6.41	6.84	6.80	6.84		7
3	Linda Ferga	France	6.45	6.75	x	6.71	6.75		6
4	Susen Tiedtke	Germany	x	6.59	x	x	6.59		5
5	Šárka Kašpárková	Czech Republic	6.33	x	6.52	6.50	6.52		4
6	Olena Khlopotnova	Ukraine	6.34	x	6.30	6.40	6.40		3
7	Sarah Claxton	Great Britain	x	x	x	6.32	6.32		2
8	Ksenija Predikaka	Slovenia	6.16	5.97	x	x	6.16		1

=== Triple jump ===
27 June

Rank	Name	Nationality	#1	#2	#3	#4	Result	Notes	Points
1	Fiona May	Italy	14.65	x	x	x	14.65		8
2	Šárka Kašpárková	Czech Republic	14.35	14.62	14.21	14.63	14.63		7
3	Olena Govorova	Ukraine	x	x	14.13	13.82	14.13		6
4	Corinne Henry	Great Britain	x	13.55	x	13.95	13.95		5
5	Yelena Donkina	Russia	13.60	13.92	13.82	13.76	13.92		4
6	Sylvie Borda	France	13.61	x	13.64	13.71	13.71		3
7	Nkechi Madubuko	Germany	x	12.97	13.10	12.99	13.10		2
8	Anja Valant	Slovenia	13.00	–	–	–	13.00		1

=== Shot put ===
28 June

Rank	Name	Nationality	#1	#2	#3	#4	Result	Notes	Points
1	Irina Korzhanenko	Russia	20.65	x	x	x	20.65		8
2	Judy Oakes	Great Britain	x	17.62	18.21	18.38	20.65		7
3	Stephanie Storp	Germany	18.38	x	x	x	18.38		6
4	Mara Rosolen	Italy	17.71	18.16	x	x	18.16		5
5	Nataša Erjavec	Slovenia	16.06	16.96	16.50	16.41	16.96		4
6	Laurence Manfredi	France	16.77	x	16.71	x	16.77		3
7	Zdenka Šilhavá	Czech Republic	15.96	16.27	x	x	16.27		2
8	Nadezhda Lukyniv	Ukraine	15.24	15.49	15.14	x	15.49		1

=== Discus throw ===
27 June

Rank	Name	Nationality	#1	#2	#3	#4	Result	Notes	Points
1	Natalya Sadova	Russia	64.18	61.79	60.84	63.09	64.18		8
2	Anja Möllenbeck	Germany	52.78	56.97	55.73	60.80	60.80		7
3	Olena Antonova	Ukraine	55.65	57.54	59.28	55.87	59.28		6
4	Agnese Maffeis	Italy	50.35	x	58.78	58.75	58.78		5
5	Isabelle Devaluez	France	52.84	54.01	55.83	57.48	57.48		4
6	Shelley Drew	Great Britain	x	54.90	56.10	55.90	56.10		3
7	Zdenka Šilhavá	Czech Republic	x	54.24	53.58	x	54.24		2
8	Nataša Erjavec	Slovenia	46.52	41.87	43.96	x	46.52		1

=== Hammer throw ===
27 June

Rank	Name	Nationality	#1	#2	#3	#4	Result	Notes	Points
1	Olga Kuzenkova	Russia	x	65.89	x	x	65.89		8
2	Kirsten Munchow	Germany	58.91	63.98	64.86	63.33	64.86		7
3	Cécile Lignot	France	58.46	61.12	54.53	x	61.12		6
4	Ester Balassini	Italy	55.63	x	59.48	x	59.48		5
5	Lorraine Shaw	Great Britain	55.81	55.16	56.86	58.02	58.02		4
6	Jana Lejsková	Czech Republic	51.67	53.33	50.69	51.23	53.33		3
7	Nataliya Kunitskaya	Ukraine	48.95	x	x	51.00	51.00		2
8	Simona Kozmus	Slovenia	44.60	47.35	47.07	47.43	47.43		1

=== Javelin throw ===
27 June – Old model

Rank	Name	Nationality	#1	#2	#3	#4	Result	Notes	Points
1	Tanja Damaske	Germany	58.40	61.66	62.30	x	62.30		8
2	Nikola Tomecková	Czech Republic	x	57.68	58.89	60.82	60.82		7
3	Oksana Makarova	Russia	58.38	x	x	x	58.38		6
4	Claudia Coslovich	Italy	57.01	55.85	53.70	57.69	57.69		5
5	Nadine Auzeil	France	x	50.87	54.84	56.56	56.56		4
6	Lorna Jackson	Great Britain	51.00	47.60	50.78	54.56	54.56		3
7	Eufemija Storga	Slovenia	54.02	51.79	51.51	51.51	54.02		2
8	Olha Ivankova	Ukraine	48.92	50.45	52.68	53.72	53.72		1
