= 2006 European Athletics Championships – Women's 10,000 metres =

Women's 10,000 metres at the European Athletics Championships

The women's 10,000 metres at the 2006 European Athletics Championships were held at the Ullevi on August 7.

All three medallists set personal bests, with Norway's Wigene bettering her time by more than two minutes. Lornah Kiplagat of the Netherlands finished fifth after leading for most of the race, while Elvan Abeylegesse of Turkey, world season best holder, did not finish.

== Medalists ==
Gold	Silver	Bronze
Inga Abitova; Russia	Susanne Wigene; Norway	Lidiya Grigoryeva; Russia

== Schedule ==
Date	Time	Round
August 7, 2006	20:10	Final

== Results ==
KEY:	NR	National record	PB	Personal best	SB	Seasonal best

=== Final ===
Rank	Name	Nationality	Time	Notes
1st place, gold medalist(s)	Inga Abitova	Russia	30:31.42	PB
2nd place, silver medalist(s)	Susanne Wigene	Norway	30:32.36	PB
3rd place, bronze medalist(s)	Lidiya Grigoryeva	Russia	30:32.72	PB
4	Galina Bogomolova	Russia	30:35.90	SB
5	Lornah Kiplagat	Netherlands	30:37.26	SB
6	Jeļena Prokopčuka	Latvia	30:38.78	NR
7	Marta Domínguez	Spain	30:51.69	NR
8	Sabrina Mockenhaupt	Germany	31:40.28	SB
9	Irina Mikitenko	Germany	31:44.82	SB
10	Nathalie De Vos	Belgium	31:45.94	PB
11	Constantina Tomescu	Romania	31:49.47	PB
12	Kathy Butler	United Kingdom	32:01.04	SB
13	Mara Yamauchi	United Kingdom	32:07.90	
14	Silvia Weissteiner	Italy	32:09.26	PB
15	Hayley Yelling	United Kingdom	32:12.50	SB
16	Christelle Daunay	France	32:15.54	SB
17	Mirja Jenni-Moser	Switzerland	32:37.66	PB
18	Renate Rungger	Italy	32:38.17	PB
19	Selma Borst	Netherlands	32:41.12	PB
20	Grażyna Syrek	Poland	32:53.33	PB
21	María Elena Moreno	Spain	32:55.10	
22	Marie Davenport	Ireland	33:05.48	
23	Zahia Dahmani	France	34:47.46	
	Elvan Abeylegesse	Turkey		DNF
	Fatiha Baouf	Belgium		DNF
	Yesenia Centeno	Spain		DNF
	Susanne Pumper	Austria		DNF
	Anja Smolders	Belgium		DNF
