= Regina Rakhimkulova =

Russian long-distance runner

Regina Rakhimkulova (born 5 November 1979 in Bashkir ASSR, USSR) is a long-distance runner from Russia who specializes in the 5,000 metres. She is a one-time national champion in the women's 5,000 metres.

She finished tenth at the 2006 European Athletics Championships in Gothenburg and twelfth in 3,000 metres at the 2007 European Indoor Championships.

Her twin sister Nadezhda is also a runner.
