= Svetlana Nekhorosh =

Ukrainian runner

Personal information
- Nationality: Ukraine
- Born: July 22, 1973 (age 52)

Sport
- Sport: long-distance running
- Event(s): 10,000 meters, half marathon, marathon

Achievements and titles
- Personal best(s): 5,000 meters: 15:41.09; 10,000 meters: 32:29.6; Half Marathon: 1:14:00; Marathon: 2:35:49

Svetlana Nekhorosh (also known as Svitlana Nekhorosh, Ukrainian: Світлана Нехорош, born July 22, 1973) is a Ukrainian middle- and long-distance runner from Donechchyna, Ukraine. She was the 1999 Ukrainian national champion in the 5,000 meters and 10,000 meters. In 2001, she was the runner-up in the Ukrainian Championship for the same races. She is the winner of multiple notable road races and a top finisher in major international races.

== Early career ==
Nekhorosh's national championships took place in Kyiv, Ukraine, in 1999 when she was 26 years old. At the outdoor track on September 21, Nekhorosh bolted from the start of the 10,000 meter race and beat her competitors to finish in 33:09.00. Just two days later, the best in the nation lined up for the 5K. Nekhorosh took the lead and kicked to win in a time of 16:01.05, giving her both national championship titles, something that had only been done previously by Yelena Vyazova.

Two years later, she was back for the 2001 championship races. There she took silver in both races. In the 10,000 meters, she was behind Nataliya Berkut, who would dominate the championships for the next decade. In 2002, she returned to the championship 10,000 again, this time taking third.

== Later career ==
Nekhorosh took on several road races in the following years, moving to half marathons and taking second in the Blagnac Half in France, first in the Ciudad de Pamplona Half Marathon, and fourth in the Saint Denis Half Marathon in 1:14:00.

Her first marathon was the Dublin Marathon in October 2003, where she finished sixth. She kept a rigorous road racing schedule afterward, running 10Ks and half marathons primarily. Her first marathon win came in 2005 at the Wrocław Marathon in Poland. Shortly after, she was third in the Košice Peace Marathon in Slovakia. The following year, she was seventh in the 2006 Rome Marathon, finishing in 2:35:49 behind countrywoman Tetyana Hladyr.

In 2006, Nokhorosh traveled to the United States and stayed in Duluth, Minnesota to run Grandma's Marathon (named after a restaurant), a point-to-point race along the North Shore of Lake Superior. Starting in Two Harbors, Minnesota, Nokhorosh battled top international athletes including Halina Karnatsevich, who had won in 2005. The race stretched out the lead pack on a sunny day, and Karnatsevich defended her title, with Nokhorosh following a few minutes behind in second place. But Karnatsevich had been pumping an anabolic steroid, Stanozolol, into her body, and the drug test administered by USA Track and Field caught the substance. Karnatsevich's 2006 win was stripped from her and Nokhorosh was moved into first, earning her $8,700.
