= 1999 European Athletics U23 Championships – Women's 5000 metres =

The women's 5000 metres event at the 1999 European Athletics U23 Championships was held in Gothenburg, Sweden, at Ullevi on 31 July 1999.

== Medalists ==
Gold	Katalin Szentgyörgyi; Hungary
Silver	Cristina Iloc; Romania
Bronze	Olivera Jevtić; Yugoslavia

== Results ==
=== Final ===
31 July

Rank	Name	Nationality	Time	Notes
1st place, gold medalist(s)	Katalin Szentgyörgyi	Hungary	15:18.80	CR
2nd place, silver medalist(s)	Cristina Iloc	Romania	15:22.64	
3rd place, bronze medalist(s)	Olivera Jevtić	Yugoslavia	15:24.83	
4	Mónica Rosa	Portugal	15:43.22	
5	Ionela Bungardean	Romania	15:45.15	
6	Sylvia Nussbeck	Germany	15:49.99	
7	Rosaria Console	Italy	15:51.35	
8	Susanne Wigene	Norway	15:56.03	
9	Alessandra Aguilar	Spain	16:03.75	
10	Jilly Ingman	Great Britain	16:04.47	
11	Judit Plá	Spain	16:11.67	
12	Melanie Schulz	Germany	16:14.32	
13	Amy Waterlow	Great Britain	16:23.10	
14	Alemitu Çolakoğlu-Bekele	Turkey	16:25.54	
	Petrine Holm	Denmark	DNF	
	Katie Skorupska	Great Britain	DNF	

== Participation ==
According to an unofficial count, 16 athletes from 11 countries participated in the event.

- Denmark (1)
- Germany (2)
- Hungary (1)
- Great Britain (3)
- Italy (1)
- Norway (1)
- Portugal (1)
- Romania (2)
- Spain (2)
- Turkey (1)
- Yugoslavia (1)
