= Tatyana Polovinskaya =

Athletics competitor

Personal information
- Full name: Тетяна Половинська
- Nationality: Ukraine
- Born: March 14, 1965 (age 61) Simferopol, Crimea, Ukrainian SSR, Soviet Union

Sport
- Sport: Running
- Event: Marathon

Tatyana Polovinskaya (Ukrainian: Тетяна Половинська; born March 14, 1965, in Simferopol, Ukrainian SSR) is a retired long-distance runner from Ukraine, who represented the Soviet Union in the women's marathon at the 1988 Summer Olympics in Seoul, South Korea, finishing in fourth place. Her mark (2:27:05) stand as a national record for nearly eighteen years. It was broken on March 26, 2006, by Tetyana Hladyr in Rome, Italy: 2:25:44.

== Achievements ==
- All results regarding marathon, unless stated otherwise

Year	Competition	Venue	Position	Notes
Representing Soviet Union
1988	Olympic Games	Seoul, South Korea	4th	2:27:05
1997	Vienna Marathon	Vienna, Austria	1st	2:30:50
