= Athletics at the 2003 Summer Universiade – Women's 5000 metres =

The women's 5000 metres event at the 2003 Summer Universiade was held on 29 August in Daegu, South Korea.

The winning margin was 0.43 seconds as it would be in the 2015 edition of these games. As of 2024, these are the only two occasions where the women's 5,000 metres has been won by less than a second at these games.

== Results ==
Rank	Athlete	Nationality	Time	Notes
1st place, gold medalist(s)	Eloise Poppett	Australia	15:47.19	
2nd place, silver medalist(s)	Zhang Yuhong	China	15:47.62	
3rd place, bronze medalist(s)	Cristina Casandra	Romania	15:50.44	
4	Hayley McGregor	Australia	15:51.82	
5	Judith Plá	Spain	15:55.97	
6	Poppy Mlambo	South Africa	16:02.34	
7	Sonia Bejarano	Spain	16:10.44	
8	Tomoko Horioka	Japan	16:22.17	
9	Rebecca Stallwood	Canada	16:40.46	
10	Eleni Gebremedhin	Ethiopia	16:52.45	
11	Fatima Boufares	Morocco	17:15.76	
12	Karla Silva	Peru	17:18.33	
	Inês Monteiro	Portugal	DNF	
