= Fedir Laukhin =

Ukrainian decathlete

Personal information
- Nationality: Ukrainian
- Born: 13 February 1974 (age 51)

Sport
- Sport: Athletics
- Event: Decathlon

Fedir Laukhin (born 13 February 1974) is a Ukrainian athlete. He competed in the men's decathlon at the 2000 Summer Olympics.
