= Judith Plá =

Spanish long-distance runner

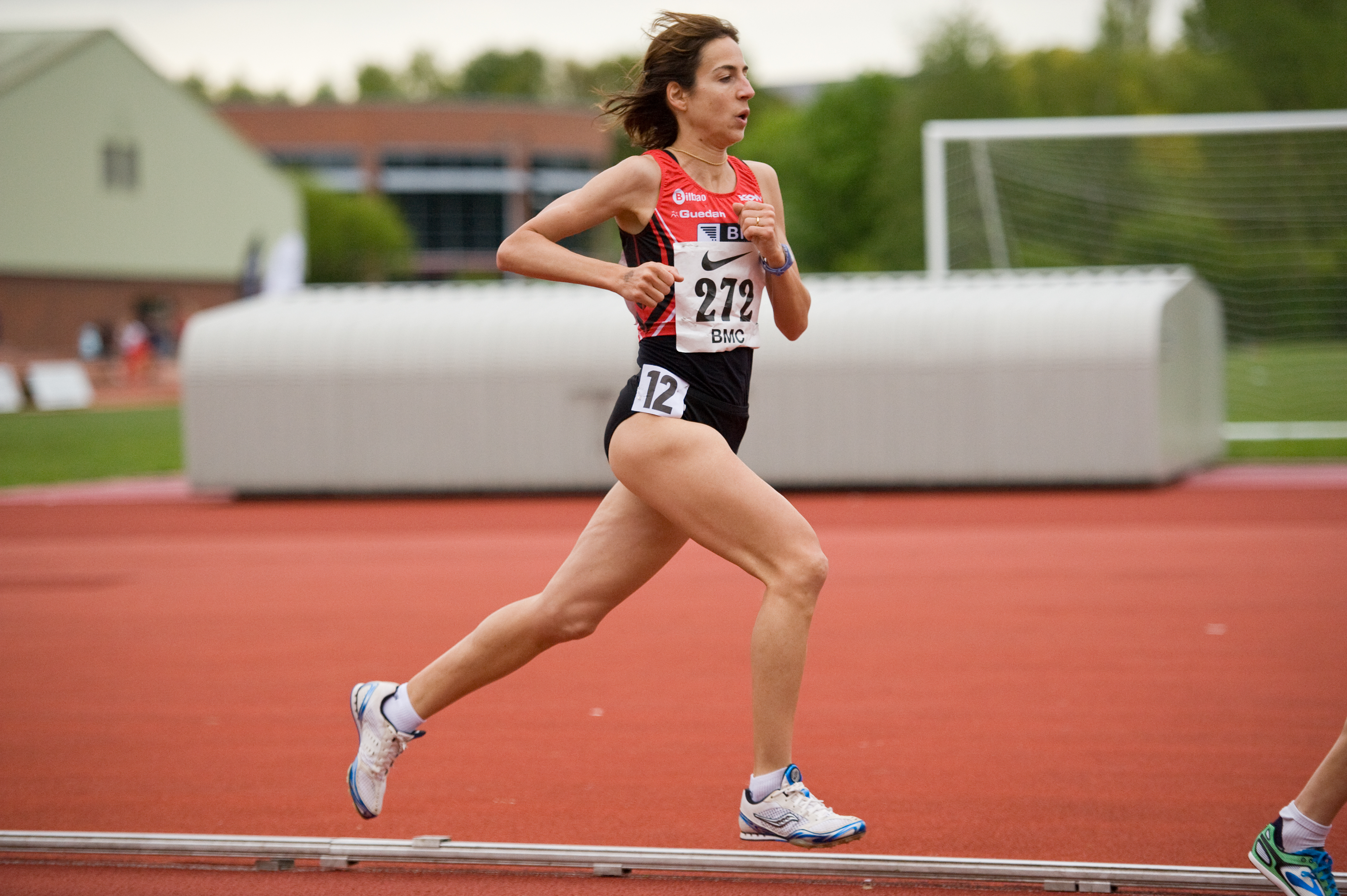
Judith Pla Roig

Judith Pla Roig (born 2 May 1978, in Barcelona) is a Spanish long-distance runner. At the 2012 Summer Olympics, she competed in the Women's 5000 metres, finishing 25th overall in Round 1, failing to qualify for the final.

== Competition record ==
Year	Competition	Venue	Position	Event	Notes
Representing Spain
1997	European Junior Championships	Ljubljana, Slovenia	4th	5000 m	16:47.91
1999	European U23 Championships	Gothenburg, Sweden	11th	5000 m	16:11.67
2001	Mediterranean Games	Radès, Tunisia	10th	5000 m	17:18.07
2003	Universiade	Daegu, South Korea	5th	5000 m	15.55.97
2004	Ibero-American Championships	Huelva, Spain	4th	3000 m	9:11.20
2009	Mediterranean Games	Pescara, Italy	4th	5000 m	15:36.86
2009	World Championships	Berlin, Germany	19th (h)	5000 m	15:54.32
2010	Ibero-American Championships	San Fernando, Spain	1st	5000 m	15:43.20
2010	European Championships	Barcelona, Spain	10th	5000 m	15:35.01
2012	European Championships	Helsinki, Finland	10th	5000 m	15:27.62
2012	Olympic Games	London, United Kingdom	25th (h)	5000 m	15:20.39
