= Viacheslav Tyrtyshnik =

Ukrainian high jumper

Personal information
- Nationality: Ukrainian
- Born: 16 January 1971 (age 55)

Sport
- Sport: Athletics
- Event: High jump
Medal record
Men's athletics
Representing Ukraine
Military World Games
Bronze medal – third place	1999 Zagreb	High jump

Viacheslav Tyrtyshnik (born 16 January 1971) is a Ukrainian athlete. He competed in the men's high jump at the 1996 Summer Olympics.
