= Viktoriya Molchanova =

Ukrainian long jumper

Viktoriya Molchanova (born 26 May 1982) is a retired Ukrainian long jumper.

She competed at the 2006 European Championships, the 2009 World Championships, the 2010 World Indoor Championships and the 2012 European Championships without reaching the final.

Her personal best jump was 6.82 metres, achieved in June 2009 in Yalta. Indoors she had 6.81 metres, achieved in January 2005 in Kharkiv.
