= Carlo Boccarini =

Italian sprinter

Personal information
- National team: Italy
- Born: 2 June 1976 (age 50) Rome, Italy

Sport
- Sport: Athletics
- Event: Sprint
- Club: G.S. Fiamme Gialle
- Coached by: Antonio Rotundo

Achievements and titles
- Personal best: 100 m: 10.08 (1998)

Carlo Boccarini (Rome, 2 June 1976) is an Italian former sprinter.

== Biography ==
He was a meteor, in 1998, when was 22 years old, ran 100 metres with the 2nd all-time Italian best performance at that moment (after the national record of 10.01 by Pietro Mennea, later beaten by Filippo Tortu in 2018, with 10.03), with the time of 10.08. After he never repeated this time and prematurely retired from competitions.

In 1998 his performance on 100 metres was the 24th time in the world year top lists.

== See also ==
- Italian all-time lists - 100 metres
