= Susan Hutton =

American poet (born 1968)

- Born: December 1968 (age 56–57); New York City
- Education: Kalamazoo College; University of Michigan
- Occupation: Poet

Susan Hutton (born December 1968 New York City) is an American poet.

== Life ==
She was raised in and around Detroit, Michigan.

She graduated from Kalamazoo College, and from the University of Michigan with an MFA, where she studied with Linda Gregerson, David Baker, and Larry Goldstein. She held a Wallace Stegner fellowship in poetry at Stanford University. She lived in Pittsburgh, Pennsylvania, and was director of development for Autumn House Press.

Her work has appeared in Crazyhorse, DoubleTake, Poetry, FIELD, Mid-American Review, Ploughshares, Prairie Schooner.

She lives in Ann Arbor, Michigan, with her husband and two children.

== Awards ==
- 2008 John C. Zacharis First Book Award

== Works ==
- "Atmospherics", Poetry, October 2006
- "Seven Journeys"; "My List"; "On the Vanishing of Large Creatures", Michigan Today, September 2006
- "Seven Journeys", AGNI, 2004
- "On the Vanishing of Large Creatures", Ploughshares, Spring 2004
- On the vanishing of large creatures. Carnegie Mellon University Press. 2007. ISBN 978-0-88748-465-0.

== Reviews ==
Susan Hutton has put together a first book that feels completely finished—each poem has been smoothed over like a pebble in a stream. As a whole, it is airtight.
