= Susanne Wigene =

Norwegian runner (born 1978)

Medal record

European Championships
Silver medal – second place	2006 Gothenburg	10,000 metres

Susanne Wigene (born 12 February 1978) is a Norwegian long-distance runner who specialized in the 5000 and 10,000 metres. She competed in all distances above the 1500 metres including steeplechase and cross-country running.

== Early career and national titles ==
In age-specific competitions, she finished fifth in the 5000 metres at the 1997 European Junior Championships and 32nd in the junior event at the 1997 European Cross Country Championships, followed by eighth in the 5000 metres at the 1999 European U23 Championships. In her first international senior competition, she finished a lowly 86th in the short race at the 2000 World Cross Country Championships, as well as 19th at the 2000 European 10,000m Cup.

Wigene won her first Norwegian title in 1998, in the 5000 metres. The event was usually dominated by Gunhild Halle Haugen, and in 1999 Wigene took silver behind Halle. Instead Wigene won the 1500 metres in 1999. She became the inaugural Norwegian champion in the 3000 metres steeplechase, taking back-to-back titles in 2000 and 2001 as well as silver in 2003.

A 5000 metres bronze in 2003 was followed by gold in 2004 and 2005. In cross-country running she won the short race in 2003 and 2005 and the long race in 2004. She then competed for SK Vidar and IK Tjalve. In IK Tjalve she was coached by Knut Kvalheim.

== International career ==
Wigene's breakthrough came in 2005 when qualifying for the 2005 World Championships. She finished 13th in the 5000 metres followed by seventh place in the 3000 metres at the 2005 World Athletics Final.

She reached her career highlight as she won the silver medal over 10 000 metres at the 2006 European Championships, clocking in 30:32,26 minutes and improving her personal best by well over 2 minutes. She finished seventh in the 5000 metres at the same championship, and eleventh at the 2006 World Athletics Final. Wigene also took four victories at the European Cup from 2004 to 2006.

== Post-active career ==
Wigene did not perform well in 2007, and "feared" for her career. Her "probable" retirement was announced in 2009. She was a primary school teacher at Skøyen and had struggled with injuries long-term. She had her first daughter in 2011 and moved back to Haugesund. A comeback was first announced, then withdrawn in 2013. She was instead employed by Haugesund IL as a coordinator.

== Personal bests ==
- 1500 metres – 4:13.01 min (Florø, 4 June 2005)
- 3000 metres – 8:40.23 min (Zürich, 19 August 2005)
- 3000 metres Steeplechase – 9.45,21 min (Königs Wusterhausen, 10 September 2004)
- 5000 metres – 14.48,53 min (Brussels, 26 August 2005)
- 10 000 metres – 30.32,36 min (Ullevi, 7 August 2006)
