= Serhiy Redko =

Ukrainian middle-distance runner

Serhiy Redko Serhii Redko
Personal information
- Nationality: Ukrainian
- Born: 24 January 1973 (age 53)

Sport
- Sport: Middle-distance running
- Event: Steeplechase

Serhiy Redko or Serhii Redko (Ukrainian: Сергій Редько; born 24 January 1973) is a Ukrainian middle-distance runner. He competed in the men's 3000 metres steeplechase at the 2000 Summer Olympics.
