= Olga Mishchenko =

Ukrainian sprinter

Personal information
- Born: 24 September 1971 (age 55)

Sport
- Sport: Track and field

Olga Mishchenko (born 24 November 1971) is a retired Ukrainian sprinter who specialized in the 400 metres.

She competed at the 2002 European Championships without reaching the final. In the 4 x 400 metres relay she competed at the 2003 World Championships without reaching the final.

Her personal best time was 51.92 seconds in the 400 metres, achieved in July 2003 in Kyiv. She also had 23.08 seconds in the 200 metres, achieved in August 2001 in Banská Bystrica.
