= Kyrylo Chuprynin =

Ukrainian discus thrower

Personal information
- Nationality: Ukrainian
- Born: 22 July 1975 (age 50)

Sport
- Sport: Athletics
- Event: Discus throw

Kyrylo Chuprynin (Ukrainian: Кирило Чупринін; born 22 July 1975) is a Ukrainian athlete. He competed in the men's discus throw at the 2000 Summer Olympics.
