= Kostyantyn Rurak =

Russian athlete (born 1974)

Personal information
- Born: 9 April 1974 (age 52) Chelyabinsk, Russian SFSR, Soviet Union

Sport
- Sport: Track and field
Medal record
Representing Ukraine
European Championships
Gold medal – first place	2002 Munich	4 × 100 metres
European Cup
Gold medal – first place	1996 Madrid	4 × 100 metres
European Junior Championships
Bronze medal – third place	1993 San Sebastián	4 × 100 metres

Kostyantyn "Kostya" Rurak (Ukrainian: Костянтин "Костя" Рурак; born 9 April 1974) is a retired sprinter from Ukraine, who twice competed at the Summer Olympics: 1996 and 2000. He set his personal best in the men's 100 metres (10.17) on 3 August 2000 in Kyiv.
