= Tetiana Debela =

Ukrainian hurdler (born 1970)

Personal information
- Nationality: Ukrainian
- Born: 28 January 1970 (age 56)

Sport
- Sport: Track and field
- Event: 400 metres hurdles

Tetiana Debela (born 28 January 1970) is a Ukrainian hurdler. She competed in the women's 400 metres hurdles at the 2000 Summer Olympics.
