= Tetyana Hladyr =

Ukrainian long-distance runner

Tetyana Hladyr or Tetiana Hladyr (Ukrainian: Тетяна Гладир, born 17 April 1975) is a retired Ukrainian long-distance runner.

== Career ==
She has won the 2003 Marseille Marathon (2:37:52 hours), the 2006 Rome City Marathon (2:25:44 hours) and 2006 Bay to Breakers footrace (39:09), and finished second at the 2002 Wachau Marathon (2:34:40 hours), the 2004 Italian Marathon (2:32:24) and the New York City Marathon (2:26:05 hours). When winning the Rome City Marathon she set a national record in the distance, breaking the 2:27:05 mark set by Tatyana Polovinskaya in 1988. She also finished tenth at the 2004 Nagoya Marathon (2:32:55 hours) and eleventh at the 2005 New York City Marathon (2:29:34 hours). She participated, but finished lowly, at the 1998 and 1999 World Cross Country Championships.

On the track she recorded 9:00.05 minutes in the 3000 metres, achieved in August 1999 in Nitra; 10:43.59 minutes in the 3000 metres steeplechase, achieved in August 2000 in Kyiv; and 33:59.13 minutes in the 10,000 metres, achieved in July 2004 in Yalta.
