= Maryna Dubrova =

Ukrainian long-distance runner

Maryna Dubrova (Ukrainian: Марина Дуброва; born 9 December 1978) is a Ukrainian long-distance runner who specializes in the 5000 metres.

== Achievements ==
Year	Competition	Venue	Position	Notes
2004	World Indoor Championships	Budapest, Hungary	8th	
2004	World Athletics Final	Monte Carlo, Monaco	10th	

=== Personal bests ===
- 1500 metres - 4:06.94 min (2004)
- 3000 metres - 8:50.34 min (2004)
- 5000 metres - 15:02.73 min (2004)
- Half marathon - 1:17:52 min (2003)
