= Nataliya Berkut =

Ukrainian long-distance runner

Personal information
- Born: 30 May 1975 (age 51)

Sport
- Country: Ukraine
- Sport: Athletics
- Event: Long-distance running

Nataliya Berkut (Ukrainian: Наталія Беркут; born 30 May 1975) is a Ukrainian long-distance runner.

She finished seventh at the 2006 World Road Running Championships. On the track she competed in 10,000 metres at the World Championships in 2001 and 2003. She was qualified in 10,000 metres for the 2008 Olympic Games, but did not actually compete.

Her personal best time is 31:08.89 minutes, achieved in June 2004 in Tula.
