= 800 metres at the World Athletics Championships =

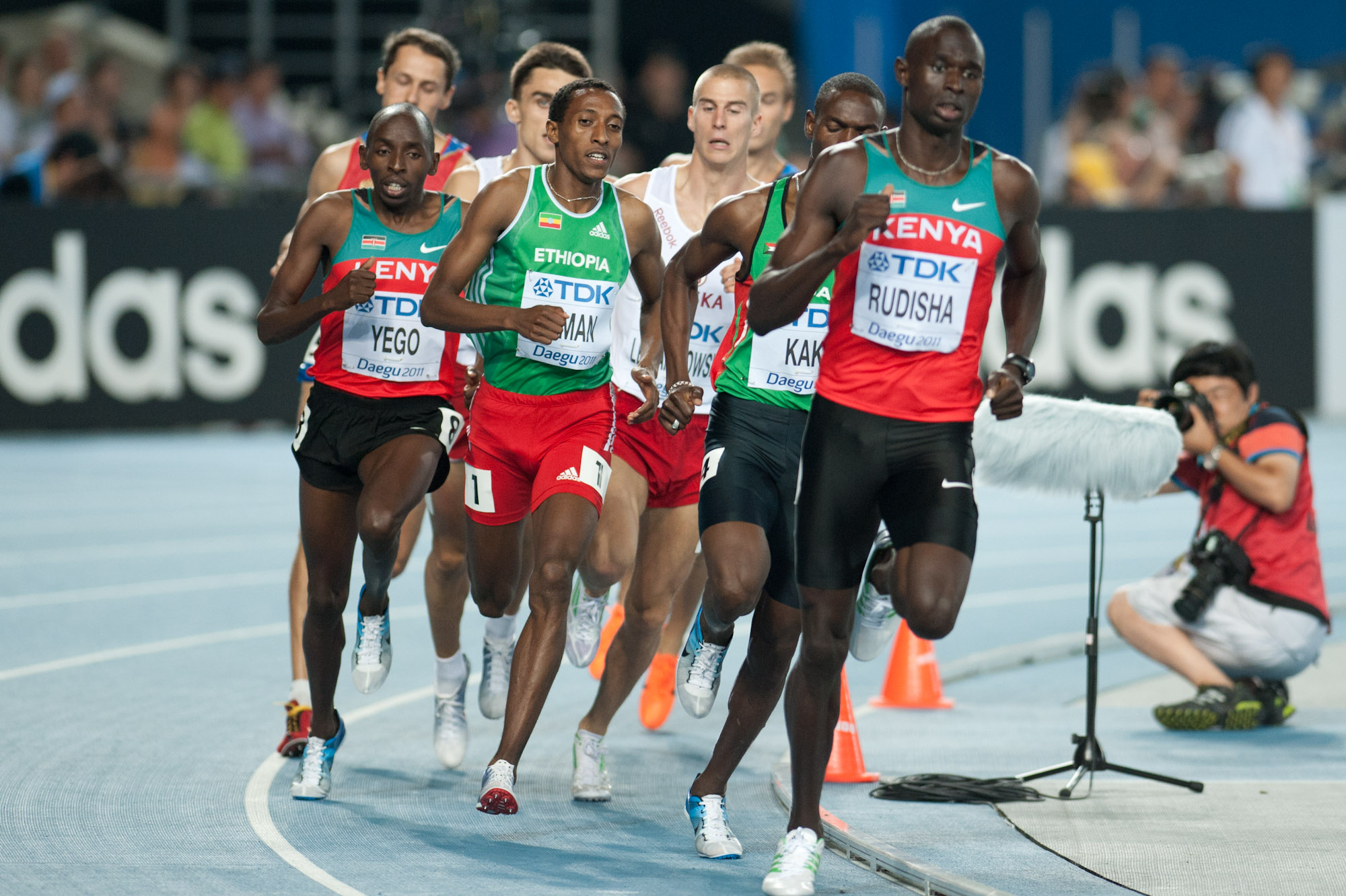
- The men's 2011 final

Overview
- Gender: Men and women
- Years held: Men: 1983 – 2025; Women: 1983 – 2025

Championship record
- Men: 1:41.86 Emmanuel Wanyonyi (2025)
- Women: 1:54.62 Lilian Odira (2025)

Reigning champion
- Men: Emmanuel Wanyonyi (KEN)
- Women: Lilian Odira (KEN)

The 800 metres at the World Championships in Athletics has been contested by both men and women since the inaugural edition in 1983. It is the second most prestigious title in the discipline after the 800 metres at the Olympics. The competition format typically has two qualifying rounds leading to a final between eight athletes.

The championship records for the event are 1:42.34 for men, set by Donavan Brazier in 2019, and 1:54.68 for women, set by Jarmila Kratochvílová in 1983. Set at the inaugural championships, Kratochvílová's record is the longest-standing record of the competition. The 800 m world record has never been broken at the competition by either men or women.

Maria Mutola is the most successful athlete of the event: from a period spanning 1993 to 2003, she won three gold medals, one silver and one bronze in the World Championships 800 m. The most successful man is Wilson Kipketer, who won three straight titles from 1995 to 1999. Only two other people, Billy Konchellah and Ana Fidelia Quirot, have won two world championship titles in the event. Yuriy Borzakovskiy, though never a champion, has won the most medals in the men's competition, with two silver and two bronze medals.

Kenya is the most successful nation in the discipline, with five gold medals in the men's, two in the women's race, and a total of 13 medals overall. The actions of Mutola and Kipketer alone rank Mozambique at the top of the women's rankings and Denmark second in the men's medal table. Cuba—the second most successful nation among women—has won three women's gold medals. South Africa is the only nation besides Kenya to have provided both a men's and women's winner. Russia has the second highest overall medal tally, with eleven medals across the men's and women's divisions, but it has also provided six of the eight athletes sanctioned for doping at this World Championship distance.

== Age records ==
- All information from World Athletics.

Distinction	Male			Female		
Distinction	Athlete	Age	Date	Athlete	Age	Date
Youngest champion	Mohammed Aman (ETH)	19 years, 215 days	13 Aug 2013	Caster Semenya (RSA)	18 years, 224 days	19 Aug 2009
Youngest medalist	Mohammed Aman (ETH)	19 years, 215 days	13 Aug 2013	Caster Semenya (RSA)	18 years, 224 days	19 Aug 2009
Youngest finalist	Belal Mansour Ali (BHR)	16 years, 301 days	14 Aug 2005	Caster Semenya (RSA)	18 years, 224 days	19 Aug 2009
Youngest participant	Mohamed Abd el Rahman (SUD)	15 years, 237 days^{[nb1]}	26 Aug 1999	Hind Musa (SUD)	14 years, 334 days	9 Aug 2001
Oldest champion	Paul Ruto (KEN)	32 years, 287 days	17 Aug 1993	Ana Quirot (CUB)	34 years, 139 days	9 Aug 1997
Oldest medalist	Paul Ruto (KEN)	32 years, 287 days	17 Aug 1993	Letitia Vriesde (SUR)	36 years, 311 days	12 Aug 2001
Oldest finalist	Osmar Barbosa dos Santos (BRA)	34 years, 315 days	31 Aug 2003	Lyubov Gurina (RUS)	38 years, 7 days	13 Aug 1995
Oldest participant	Babacar Niang (SEN)	36 years, 330 days	5 Aug 1995	Letitia Vriesde (SUR)	40 years, 306 days	7 Aug 2005

^{nb} The exact date of birth of the youngest male participant, Mohamed Abd el Rahman, is unknown but he remains the youngest given his known year of birth and calculating from 1 January of that year.

== Doping ==
A total of nine athletes, all of them women and seven of them Russian, have had their 800 m results annulled at the World Championships due to doping infractions. The first was Delisa Floyd of the United States (1991 semi-finalist) was among the first few women to be disqualified from the championships for doping. The 1993 finalist Liliya Nurutdinova was the only woman disqualified at the 1993 championships. Another Russian, Lyubov Tsyoma, had her semi-final run in 1997 annulled. Ten years passed without incident until a third Russian, Svetlana Cherkasova was struck from the heats for doping in 2007.

Two women semi-finalists were disqualified for doping in 2009: a fourth Russian, Svetlana Klyuka, and Tetiana Petlyuk of Ukraine. Petlyuk was retrospectively banned through a biological passport anomaly and this also took in her run at the 2011 World Championships. That same year two more Russians were disqualified, both of them finalists: Yuliya Rusanova and Yekaterina Kostetskaya. In 2017, the third Russian finalist, gold medalist Mariya Savinova was banned for life, retroactive to 2010, making it a clean sweep of disqualified Russians in 2011, as well as taking Savinova's silver in 2013. Both times Alysia Johnson Montaño advanced to take the bronze medal.

== Medalists ==
=== Men ===
Championships	Gold	Silver	Bronze
1983 Helsinki	Willi Wülbeck (FRG)	Rob Druppers (NED)	Joaquim Cruz (BRA)
1987 Rome	Billy Konchellah (KEN)	Peter Elliott (GBR)	José Luíz Barbosa (BRA)
1991 Tokyo	Billy Konchellah (KEN)	José Luíz Barbosa (BRA)	Mark Everett (USA)
1993 Stuttgart	Paul Ruto (KEN)	Giuseppe D'Urso (ITA)	Billy Konchellah (KEN)
1995 Gothenburg	Wilson Kipketer (DEN)	Arthémon Hatungimana (BDI)	Vebjørn Rodal (NOR)
1997 Athens	Wilson Kipketer (DEN)	Norberto Téllez (CUB)	Rich Kenah (USA)
1999 Seville	Wilson Kipketer (DEN)	Hezekiél Sepeng (RSA)	Djabir Saïd-Guerni (ALG)
2001 Edmonton	André Bucher (SUI)	Wilfred Bungei (KEN)	Paweł Czapiewski (POL)
2003 Saint-Denis	Djabir Saïd-Guerni (ALG)	Yuriy Borzakovskiy (RUS)	Mbulaeni Mulaudzi (RSA)
2005 Helsinki	Rashid Ramzi (BHR)	Yuriy Borzakovskiy (RUS)	William Yiampoy (KEN)
2007 Osaka	Alfred Kirwa Yego (KEN)	Gary Reed (CAN)	Yuriy Borzakovskiy (RUS)
2009 Berlin	Mbulaeni Mulaudzi (RSA)	Alfred Kirwa Yego (KEN)	Yusuf Saad Kamel (BHR)
2011 Daegu	David Rudisha (KEN)	Abubaker Kaki (SUD)	Yuriy Borzakovskiy (RUS)
2013 Moscow	Mohammed Aman (ETH)	Nick Symmonds (USA)	Ayanleh Souleiman (DJI)
2015 Beijing	David Rudisha (KEN)	Adam Kszczot (POL)	Amel Tuka (BIH)
2017 London	Pierre-Ambroise Bosse (FRA)	Adam Kszczot (POL)	Kipyegon Bett (KEN)
2019 Doha	Donavan Brazier (USA)	Amel Tuka (BIH)	Ferguson Cheruiyot Rotich (KEN)
2022 Eugene	Emmanuel Korir (KEN)	Djamel Sedjati (ALG)	Marco Arop (CAN)
2023 Budapest	Marco Arop (CAN)	Emmanuel Wanyonyi (KEN)	Ben Pattison (GBR)
2025 Tokyo	Emmanuel Wanyonyi (KEN)	Djamel Sedjati (ALG)	Marco Arop (CAN)

==== Medalists by country ====
Rank	Nation	Gold	Silver	Bronze	Total
1	Kenya (KEN)	8	3	4	15
2	Denmark (DEN)	3	0	0	3
3	Algeria (ALG)	1	2	1	4
4	United States (USA)	1	1	2	4
4	Canada (CAN)	1	1	2	4
6	South Africa (RSA)	1	1	1	3
7	Bahrain (BHR)	1	0	1	2
8	Ethiopia (ETH)	1	0	0	1
8	Switzerland (SUI)	1	0	0	1
8	West Germany (FRG)	1	0	0	1
8	France (FRA)	1	0	0	1
12	Russia (RUS)	0	2	2	4
13	Poland (POL)	0	2	1	3
14	Brazil (BRA)	0	1	2	3
15	Bosnia and Herzegovina (BIH)	0	1	1	2
15	Great Britain (GBR)	0	1	1	2
17	Italy (ITA)	0	1	0	1
17	Netherlands (NED)	0	1	0	1
17	Sudan (SUD)	0	1	0	1
17	Burundi (BDI)	0	1	0	1
17	Cuba (CUB)	0	1	0	1
22	Djibouti (DJI)	0	0	1	1
22	Norway (NOR)	0	0	1	1

==== Multiple medalists ====
Rank	Athlete	Nation	Period	Gold	Silver	Bronze	Total
1	Wilson Kipketer	Denmark (DEN)	1995–1999	3	0	0	3
2	Billy Konchellah	Kenya (KEN)	1987–1993	2	0	1	3
3	David Rudisha	Kenya (KEN)	2011–2015	2	0	0	2
4	Alfred Kirwa Yego	Kenya (KEN)	2007–2009	1	1	0	2
5	Emmanuel Wanyonyi	Kenya (KEN)	2023-2025	1	1	0	2
6	Marco Arop	Canada (CAN)	2022-2025	1	0	2	3
7	Djabir Saïd-Guerni	Algeria (ALG)	1999–2003	1	0	1	2
7	Mbulaeni Mulaudzi	South Africa (RSA)	2003–2009	1	0	1	2
9	Yuriy Borzakovskiy	Russia (RUS)	2003–2011	0	2	2	4
10	Adam Kszczot	Poland (POL)	2015-2017	0	2	0	2
10	Djamel Sedjati	Algeria (ALG)	2022-2025	0	2	0	2
12	José Luiz Barbosa	Brazil (BRA)	1987–1991	0	1	1	2
12	Amel Tuka	Bosnia and Herzegovina (BIH)	2015-2019	0	1	1	2

=== Women ===
Championships	Gold	Silver	Bronze
1983 Helsinki	Jarmila Kratochvílová (TCH)	Lyubov Gurina (URS)	Yekaterina Podkopayeva (URS)
1987 Rome	Sigrun Wodars (GDR)	Christine Wachtel (GDR)	Lyubov Gurina (URS)
1991 Tokyo	Liliya Nurutdinova (URS)	Ana Fidelia Quirot (CUB)	Ella Kovacs (ROU)
1993 Stuttgart	Maria Mutola (MOZ)	Lyubov Gurina (RUS)	Ella Kovacs (ROU)
1995 Gothenburg	Ana Fidelia Quirot (CUB)	Letitia Vriesde (SUR)	Kelly Holmes (GBR)
1997 Athens	Ana Fidelia Quirot (CUB)	Yelena Afanasyeva (RUS)	Maria Mutola (MOZ)
1999 Seville	Ludmila Formanová (CZE)	Maria Mutola (MOZ)	Svetlana Masterkova (RUS)
2001 Edmonton	Maria Mutola (MOZ)	Stephanie Graf (AUT)	Letitia Vriesde (SUR)
2003 Saint-Denis	Maria Mutola (MOZ)	Kelly Holmes (GBR)	Natalya Khrushcheleva (RUS)
2005 Helsinki	Zulia Calatayud (CUB)	Hasna Benhassi (MAR)	Tatyana Andrianova (RUS)
2007 Osaka	Janeth Jepkosgei (KEN)	Hasna Benhassi (MAR)	Mayte Martínez (ESP)
2009 Berlin	Caster Semenya (RSA)	Janeth Jepkosgei (KEN)	Jenny Meadows (GBR)
2011 Daegu	Caster Semenya (RSA)	Janeth Jepkosgei (KEN)	Alysia Johnson Montaño (USA)
2013 Moscow	Eunice Sum (KEN)	Brenda Martinez (USA)	Alysia Johnson Montaño (USA)
2015 Beijing	Maryna Arzamasava (BLR)	Melissa Bishop (CAN)	Eunice Sum (KEN)
2017 London	Caster Semenya (RSA)	Francine Niyonsaba (BDI)	Ajeé Wilson (USA)
2019 Doha	Halimah Nakaayi (UGA)	Raevyn Rogers (USA)	Ajeé Wilson (USA)
2022 Eugene	Athing Mu (USA)	Keely Hodgkinson (GBR)	Mary Moraa (KEN)
2023 Budapest	Mary Moraa (KEN)	Keely Hodgkinson (GBR)	Athing Mu (USA)
2025 Tokyo	Lilian Odira (KEN)	Georgia Hunter Bell (GBR)	Keely Hodgkinson (GBR)

==== Medalists by country ====
Rank	Nation	Gold	Silver	Bronze	Total
1	Kenya (KEN)	4	2	2	8
2	Mozambique (MOZ)	3	1	1	5
3	Cuba (CUB)	3	1	0	4
4	South Africa (RSA)	3	0	0	3
5	United States (USA)	1	2	5	8
6	Soviet Union (URS)	1	1	2	4
7	East Germany (GDR)	1	1	0	2
8	Belarus (BLR)	1	0	0	1
8	Czech Republic (CZE)	1	0	0	1
8	Czechoslovakia (TCH)	1	0	0	1
8	Uganda (UGA)	1	0	0	1
12	Great Britain (GBR)	0	4	3	7
13	Russia (RUS)	0	2	3	5
14	Morocco (MAR)	0	2	0	2
15	Suriname (SUR)	0	1	1	2
16	Austria (AUT)	0	1	0	1
17	Romania (ROM)	0	0	2	2
18	Spain (ESP)	0	0	1	1
19	Burundi (BDI)	0	1	0	1
19	Canada (CAN)	0	1	0	1

==== Multiple medalists ====
Rank	Athlete	Nation	Period	Gold	Silver	Bronze	Total
1	Maria Mutola	Mozambique (MOZ)	1993–2003	3	1	1	5
2	Caster Semenya	South Africa (RSA)	2009–2017	3	0	0	3
3	Ana Fidelia Quirot	Cuba (CUB)	1991–1997	2	1	0	3
4	Janeth Jepkosgei	Kenya (KEN)	2007–2011	1	1	1	3
5	Mariya Savinova	Russia (RUS)	2011–2013	1	1	0	2
6	Athing Mu	United States (USA)	2022-2023	1	0	1	2
6	Mary Moraa	Kenya (KEN)	2022-2023	1	0	1	2
8	Lyubov Gurina	Soviet Union (URS); Russia (RUS)	1983–1993	0	2	1	3
8	Keely Hodgkinson	Great Britain (GBR)	2022-2025	0	2	1	3
10	Hasna Benhassi	Morocco (MAR)	2005–2007	0	2	0	2
11	Letitia Vriesde	Suriname (SUR)	1995–2001	0	1	1	2
11	Kelly Holmes	Great Britain (GBR)	1995–2003	0	1	1	2
13	Ella Kovacs	Romania (ROM)	1991–1993	0	0	2	2
13	Ajeé Wilson	United States (USA)	2017-2019	0	0	2	2
13	Alysia Johnson Montaño	United States (USA)	2011-2013	0	0	2	2

== Championship record progression ==
=== Men ===
Men's 800 metres World Championships record progression
Time	Athlete	Nation	Year	Round	Date
1:46.32	James Robinson	United States (USA)	1983	Heats	1983-08-07
1:45.84	David Mack	United States (USA)	1983	Heats	1983-08-07
1:45.62	Joaquim Cruz	Brazil (BRA)	1983	Semi-final	1983-08-08
1:45.24	Hans-Peter Ferner	West Germany (FRG)	1983	Semi-final	1983-08-08
1:43.65	Willi Wülbeck	West Germany (FRG)	1983	Final	1983-08-09
1:43.06	Billy Konchellah	Kenya (KEN)	1987	Final	1987-09-01
1:42.34	Donovan Brazier	United States (USA)	2019	Final	2019-10-01
1:41.86	Emmanuel Wanyonyi	Kenya (KEN)	2025	Final	2025-09-20

=== Women ===
Women's 800 metres World Championships record progression
Time	Athlete	Nation	Year	Round	Date
2:02.08	Margrit Klinger	West Germany (FRG)	1983	Heats	1983-08-07
1:59.55	Yekaterina Podkopayeva	Soviet Union (URS)	1983	Semi-finals	1983-08-08
1:59.33	Lyubov Gurina	Soviet Union (URS)	1983	Semi-finals	1983-08-08
1:54.68	Jarmila Kratochvílová	Czechoslovakia (TCH)	1983	Final	1983-08-09
1:54.62	Lilian Odira	Kenya (KEN)	2025	Final	2025-09-21

== Finishing times ==
=== Top ten fastest World Championship times ===
Fastest men's times at the World Championships
Rank	Time (sec)	Athlete	Nation	Year	Date
1	1:41.86	Emmanuel Wanyonyi	Kenya	2025	2025-09-20
2	1:41.90	Djamel Sedjati	Algeria	2025	2025-09-20
3	1:41.95	Marco Arop	Canada	2025	2025-09-20
4	1:42.15	Cian McPhillips	Ireland	2025	2025-09-20
5	1:42.21	Mohammed Attaoui	Spain	2025	2025-09-20
6	1:42.29	Max Burgin	Great Britain	2025	2025-09-20
7	1:42.34	Donavan Brazier	United States	2019	2019-10-01
8	1:42.76	Navasky Anderson	Jamaica	2025	2025-09-20
9	1:42.77	Tshepiso Masalela	Botswana	2025	2025-09-20
10	1:43.06	Billy Konchellah	Kenya	1987	1987-09-01

Fastest women's times at the World Championships
Rank	Time (sec)	Athlete	Nation	Year	Date
1	1:54.62	Lilian Odira	Kenya	2025	2025-09-21
2	1:54.68	Jarmila Kratochvílová	Czechoslovakia	1983	1983-09-08
3	1:54.90	Georgia Hunter Bell	Great Britain	2025	2025-09-21
4	1:54.91	Keely Hodgkinson	Great Britain	2025	2025-09-21
5	1:55.16	Caster Semenya	South Africa	2017	2017-08-13
6	1:55.26	Sigrun Wodars	East Germany	1987	1987-08-31
7	1:55.32	Christine Wachtel	East Germany	1987	1987-08-31
8	1:55.43	Maria Mutola	Mozambique	1993	1993-08-17
9	1:55.45	Caster Semenya	South Africa	2009	2009-08-19
10	1:55.56	Lyubov Gurina	Soviet Union	1987	1987-08-31

== Bibliography ==
- Butler, Mark (2013). IAAF Statistics Book Moscow 2013 (PDF). IAAF. Archived from the original (PDF) on 12 October 2014.
