= 1986 European Athletics Championships – Women's 800 metres =

Women's 800 metres at the European Athletics Championships

These are the official results of the Women's 800 metres event at the 1986 European Championships in Stuttgart, West Germany, held at Neckarstadion on 26, 27, and 28 August 1986.

== Medalists ==
Gold	Nadiya Olizarenko; Soviet Union
Silver	Sigrun Wodars; East Germany
Bronze	Lyubov Gurina; Soviet Union

== Results ==
=== Final ===
28 August

Rank	Name	Nationality	Time	Notes
1st place, gold medalist(s)	Nadiya Olizarenko	Soviet Union	1:57.15	
2nd place, silver medalist(s)	Sigrun Wodars	East Germany	1:57.42	
3rd place, bronze medalist(s)	Lyubov Gurina	Soviet Union	1:57.73	
4	Gaby Bussmann	West Germany	1:58.57	
5	Milena Strnadová	Czechoslovakia	1:58.89	
6	Mitica Junghiatu	Romania	1:59.22	
7	Lyubov Kiryukhina	Soviet Union	1:59.67	
8	Christine Wachtel	East Germany	2:00.02	

=== Semi-finals ===
27 August

==== Semi-final 1 ====
Rank	Name	Nationality	Time	Notes
1	Lyubov Gurina	Soviet Union	1:59.66	Q
2	Milena Strnadová	Czechoslovakia	2:00.02	Q
3	Mitica Junghiatu	Romania	2:00.02	Q
4	Christine Wachtel	East Germany	2:00.36	Q
5	Shireen Bailey	United Kingdom	2:00.50	
6	Lorraine Baker	United Kingdom	2:02.03	
7	Slobodanka Čolović	Yugoslavia	2:02.59	
8	Rosa-María Colorado	Spain	2:05.56	

==== Semi-final 2 ====
Rank	Name	Nationality	Time	Notes
1	Sigrun Wodars	East Germany	1:58.26	Q
2	Nadiya Olizarenko	Soviet Union	1:58.70	Q
3	Gaby Bussmann	West Germany	1:58.97	Q
4	Lyubov Kiryukhina	Soviet Union	1:59.05	Q
5	Gabriela Sedláková	Czechoslovakia	2:00.61	
6	Diane Edwards	United Kingdom	2:00.84	
7	Régine Berg	Belgium	2:02.05	
8	Violeta Beclea	Romania	2:08.25	

=== Heats ===
26 August

==== Heat 1 ====
Rank	Name	Nationality	Time	Notes
1	Lyubov Gurina	Soviet Union	2:00.22	Q
2	Gaby Bussmann	West Germany	2:00.27	Q
3	Sigrun Wodars	East Germany	2:00.28	Q
4	Mitica Junghiatu	Romania	2:00.35	Q
5	Shireen Bailey	United Kingdom	2:00.41	q
6	Kaisa Ylimäki	Finland	2:06.37	

==== Heat 2 ====
Rank	Name	Nationality	Time	Notes
1	Diane Edwards	United Kingdom	2:03.59	Q
2	Milena Strnadová	Czechoslovakia	2:03.59	Q
3	Lyubov Kiryukhina	Soviet Union	2:03.65	Q
4	Rosa-María Colorado	Spain	2:03.74	Q
5	Christine Wachtel	East Germany	2:03.81	q
6	Violeta Beclea	Romania	2:04.86	q

==== Heat 3 ====
Rank	Name	Nationality	Time	Notes
1	Nadiya Olizarenko	Soviet Union	2:02.12	Q
2	Gabriela Sedláková	Czechoslovakia	2:02.57	Q
3	Slobodanka Čolović	Yugoslavia	2:02.59	Q
4	Lorraine Baker	United Kingdom	2:02.62	Q
5	Régine Berg	Belgium	2:02.67	q

== Participation ==
According to an unofficial count, 17 athletes from 10 countries participated in the event.

- Belgium (1)
- Czechoslovakia (2)
- East Germany (2)
- Finland (1)
- Romania (2)
- Soviet Union (3)
- Spain (1)
- United Kingdom (3)
- West Germany (1)
- Yugoslavia (1)

== See also ==
- 1984 Women's Olympic 800 metres (Los Angeles)
- 1987 Women's World Championships 800 metres (Rome)
- 1988 Women's Olympic 800 metres (Seoul)
