= Diane Modahl =

English middle-distance runner

Diane Modahl MBE
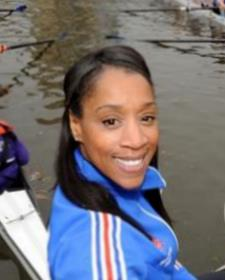
- Diane Modahl launches the 2009 Two Cities Boat Race

Personal information
- Nationality: British (English)
- Born: 17 June 1966 (age 60) Manchester, England
- Height: 170 cm (5 ft 7 in)
- Weight: 56 kg (123 lb)

Sport
- Sport: Athletics
- Event: 800 metres
- Club: Sale Harriers
- Turned pro: 1986
- Coached by: Vicente Modahl
- Retired: 2002
- Now coaching: Aimee Pratt
Medal record
Athletics
Representing United Kingdom
Commonwealth Games
| Gold medal – first place | 1990 Auckland | 800 m |
| Silver medal – second place | 1986 Edinburgh | 800 m |
| Bronze medal – third place | 1998 Kuala Lumpur | 800 m |

Diane Dolores Modahl (née Edwards, born 17 June 1966) is an English former middle-distance runner who specialised in the 800 metres. She won a gold medal in the 800 m at the 1990 Commonwealth Games, silver at the 1986 Commonwealth Games, and bronze at the 1998 Commonwealth Games.

She finished third at the 1989 IAAF Grand Prix Final, fourth at the 1993 World Championships, and won the European Cup in 1994. She has also won six AAAs National 800 m titles.

She represented Great Britain at four Olympic Games (1988–2000), reaching the 800 m final in 1988.

Her career best 800 m time of 1:58.65 in 1990, which ranks her 14th on the UK all-time list as of May 2025.

== Career ==
Born Diane Dolores Edwards in Manchester, to Jamaican parents, she won the 1984 English Schools 800 metres title in 2:05.7. She emerged as one of Britain's top 800m runners as a 20-year-old in 1986, winning the AAA Championships title ahead of Lorraine Baker. She went on to win a silver medal at the 1986 Commonwealth Games in Edinburgh in 2:01.12, finishing second to Kirsty Wade. A month later at the 1986 European Championships, she reached the semi-finals of the 800m, where she was eliminated in 2:00.84.

In 1987, Edwards won the UK Championship 800m title in June, ran a personal best of 1:59.30 to finish fourth at the Oslo Grand Prix on 4 July, and retained her AAAs 800m title, to earn selection for the 1987 World Championships, where she reached the semifinals and ran 1:59.34. In 1988, she earned selection for the Seoul Olympic Games, where she ran 1:59.66 in the semifinals, qualifying for the final. In the final, she finished eighth in 2:00.77. She had one of the best seasons of her career in 1989, including running 2:00.83 to finish third in the 800m at the IAAF Grand Prix Final in Monaco, behind Ana Quirot and Christine Wachtel. She was ranked number seven on the 1989 Track & Field News world merit rankings at 800m.

In January 1990, Edwards won the gold medal in the 800m at the Commonwealth Games, winning in 2:00.25. On 14 July 1990 she broke the English record in the 800m with 1:58.65 in Oslo, a time that would remain the best of her career. The previous record was 1:58.98 by Shireen Bailey in 1987, the UK record being held by the Scottish born Welsh athlete Kirsty Wade (1:57.42). In August, Edwards reached the final at the 1990 European Championships, finishing eighth. After struggling with injury, she won her third AAAs 800m title in 1992, to earn selection for the Barcelona Olympics, where she reached the semifinals.

In 1993, now competing as Diane Modahl, she had perhaps the best season of her career, consistently running below two minutes for 800m, with her season's best being 1:59.00 in Zurich. At the 1993 World Championships in Stuttgart, she ran 1:59.12 in the semifinals to qualify for the final. In the final, won by Maria Mutola, she finished fourth in 1:59.42. Modahl was ranked in the top ten of the Track & Field News 800m world merit rankings for the second time in 1993, again at number seven. In 1994, she won her fifth AAAs 800m title and won the 800m at the European Cup in Gateshead, edging out Patricia Djate of France. However at that years European Championships in Helsinki, she was eliminated in the semifinals, running 2:02.18.

Modahl returned to competition in 1996 and finished second behind Kelly Holmes in the 800 metres at the British Olympic trials in June, running 1:59.87. At the Atlanta Olympic Games in August, she pulled a hamstring in her heat, 50m from the finish. In 1998, she won her sixth AAAs 800m title, before going on to win the 800m bronze medal at the Commonwealth Games in Kuala Lumpur in the world class time of 1:58.81. She competed at her fourth Olympic Games in Sydney 2000, where she was eliminated in the heats running 2:02.41. She retired in 2002.

== Legal challenge against positive drug test ==
In 1994, following a routine drug test, Modahl was sent home from the Victoria Commonwealth Games in Canada by the British Athletics Federation and subsequently banned from competition, after the results were returned positive. Modahl challenged the IAAF's drug-testing procedures and said she intended to produce evidence at the hearing which will show ''once and for all that no doping offence has been committed".

On returning to the UK, and adamant of her innocence, Diane engaged lawyers to make the case that the laboratory in Lisbon which tested her sample had major flaws in their processing. The case revealed that the laboratory had stored her urine sample on a table in the stadium in a room heated at 35 °C for three days, causing serious bacterial degradation. The evidence supported Modahl's claim of innocence and she won the case. Modahl said, "I have declared my innocence, I have never taken any banned substance".

The British Athletics Federation lifted Modahl's ban on 25 July 1995. On 25 March 1996 the IAAF cleared Modahl of the charges.

The High Court, Court of Appeal and the House of Lords in London, whose panels included prominent judges such as Lord Irvine and Lord Woolf also stated in their summaries that Modahl should be seen as being innocent of all charges.

Ultimately, the cost financially ruined Modahl and contributed to the financial collapse of the BAF in 1998, which was replaced by UK Athletics.

Modahl and her husband Vicente wrote a book about their experiences, The Diane Modahl Story - Going the Distance, published in 1995. A second updated edition was released in 1996 after Modahl won her case.

== Career after athletics and charity work ==
Diane retired from competition in 2002 but remained heavily involved in sport.

In 2010, Diane established the Diane Modahl Sports Foundation (DMSF), a registered charity, alongside her husband, Vicente. DMSF brings athletics coaching opportunities to young people, particularly those living in disadvantaged areas.

Modahl was Lay Adviser to the Central Manchester Clinical Commissioning Group 2014–2015, Non Executive Director Primary Care Trust (PCT) NHS Manchester 2011–2014, and was previously the Chief Ambassador for the National Charity – Street Games. In 2019, she was appointed by Sports England as a member of the Talent Inclusion Advisory Group. She also became Board Trustee of the Greater Manchester Mayor’s Charity.

In 2020, she was appointed by Andy Burnham, Mayor of Greater Manchester, as the Chair of Greater Manchester’s Young Person’s Task Force, an unpaid position designed to aid the Covid-19 recovery process. This included direct engagement with young people and youth organisations as well as with colleges, training providers and business.

In 2021, Commonwealth Games England appointed Modahl to the Board as a non-executive director from 1 May.

Diane also contributes to Street Games, an initiative that harnesses the power of sport to create positive change in the lives of disadvantaged young people right across the UK, and ‘A Bed Every Night’, a scheme that supports the provision of shelter and support for homeless people in Greater Manchester.

== Honours and awards ==
In 2002, Diane was awarded a joint honorary degree of Doctor of Letters alongside Roger Bannister, Clive Lloyd CBE, the Rt Hon Donald McKinnon and Dr Mamphela Ramphele by the Greater Manchester Universities (Manchester Metropolitan University, University of Manchester, Salford University and UMIST) for their great contributions to the Commonwealth to mark the 17th Commonwealth Games taking place in Manchester in 2002.

In the 2018 Birthday Honours, Diane was appointed a Member of the Order of the British Empire (MBE) for services to sport and young people in North West England.

== Personal life ==
Her cousin is retired boxer Chris Eubank.

In 1992 she married Vicente Modahl, a Norwegian international athletics coach and players' agent licensed by the Football Association of England, as well as a UEFA/FIFA match agent. The couple have three daughters, the eldest of whom has competed for several years for Sale Harriers.

She took part in the third series of I'm A Celebrity...Get Me Out of Here! in 2004.

In October 2025 the BBC reported that the marriage had ended, and that Vicente Modahl had been charged with 19 sexual offences including sexual assault of a child, rape and controlling and coercive behaviour.

== Achievements ==
- 6 AAA's Championships 800 metres titles (1986,87,89,92,94,98)
- 2 UK Championships titles (1987 800m & 1990 400m)

| Year | Competition | Venue | Position | Event | Notes |
Representing England
| 1986 | Commonwealth Games | Edinburgh, United Kingdom | 2nd | 800 m | 2:01.12 |
| 1990 | Commonwealth Games | Auckland, New Zealand | 1st | 800 m | 2:00.25 |
| 1998 | Commonwealth Games | Kuala Lumpur, Malaysia | 3rd | 800 m | 1:58.81 |
Representing Great Britain
| 1986 | European Championships | Stuttgart, Germany | 11th (sf) | 800 m | 2:00.84 |
| 1987 | European Cup | Prague, Czechoslovakia | 4th | 800 m | 2:00.21 |
| 1987 | World Championships | Rome, Italy | semi-finals | 800 m | 1:59.34 |
| 1988 | Olympic Games | Seoul, South Korea | 8th | 800 m | 2:00.77 |
| 1989 | European Cup | Gateshead, United Kingdom | 5th. | 800 m | 2:01.13 |
| 1989 | Grand Prix Final | Fontvieille, Monaco | 3rd | 800 m | 2:00.83 |
| 1990 | European Indoor Championships | Glasgow, United Kingdom | 7th | 1500 m | 4:21.27 |
| 1990 | European Championships | Split, Yugoslavia | 8th | 800 m | 2:02.62 |
| 1992 | Olympic Games | Barcelona, Spain | 15th (sf) | 800 m | 2:04.32 |
| 1993 | European Cup | Rome, Italy | 5th | 800 m | 2:00.2 |
| 1993 | World Championships | Stuttgart, Germany | 4th | 800 m | 1:59.42 |
| 1993 | Grand Prix Final | London, United Kingdom | 7th | 800 m | 2:01.74 |
| 1994 | European Cup | Birmingham, United Kingdom | 1st | 800 m | 2:02.81 |
| 1994 | Goodwill Games | Saint Petersburg, Russia | 4th | 800 m | 1:59.85 |
| 1994 | European Championships | Helsinki, Finland | 14th (sf) | 800 m | 2:02.18 |
| 1996 | Olympic Games | Atlanta, United States | heats | 800 m | DNF |
| 1998 | Goodwill Games | New York, United States | 5th | 800 m | 2:02.01 |
| 1998 | European Championships | Budapest, Hungary | 9th (sf) | 800 m | 2:00.08 |
| 1999 | European Cup | Paris, France | 5th | 800 m | 2:00.80 |
| 1999 | World Championships | Seville, Spain | 17th (h) | 800 m | 2:00.83 |
| 2000 | Olympic Games | Sydney, Australia | 21st (h) | 800 m | 2:02.41 |
