= Athletics at the 1987 Pan American Games – Women's 800 metres =

Women's 800 metres at the Pan American Games

The women's 800 metres event at the 1987 Pan American Games was held in Indianapolis, United States on 15 and 16 August.

== Medalists ==
Gold	Silver	Bronze
Ana Fidelia Quirot; Cuba	Delisa Floyd; United States	Soraya Telles; Brazil

== Results ==
=== Heats ===
Rank	Heat	Name	Nationality	Time	Notes
1	1	Ana Fidelia Quirot	Cuba	2:04.16	Q
2	1	Angelita Lind	Puerto Rico	2:04.75	Q
3	1	Delisa Floyd	United States	2:05.04	Q
4	2	Renée Belanger	Canada	2:09.35	Q
5	2	Essie Washington	United States	2:09.44	Q
6	2	Soraya Telles	Brazil	2:09.56	Q
7	1	Norfalia Carabalí	Colombia	2:10.58	q
8	1	Jennifer Fisher	Bermuda	2:12.04	q
9	2	Mireille Sankaatsing	Suriname	2:15.73	
	2	Maureen Stewart	Costa Rica	DNS	

=== Final ===
Rank	Name	Nationality	Time	Notes
1st place, gold medalist(s)	Ana Fidelia Quirot	Cuba	1:59.06	GR
2nd place, silver medalist(s)	Delisa Floyd	United States	2:00.54	
3rd place, bronze medalist(s)	Soraya Telles	Brazil	2:00.56	NR
4	Essie Washington	United States	2:04.66	
5	Angelita Lind	Puerto Rico	2:04.83	
6	Renée Belanger	Canada	2:07.54	
7	Jennifer Fisher	Bermuda	2:09.37	
8	Norfalia Carabalí	Colombia	2:09.72	
