= Athletics at the 1988 Summer Olympics – Women's 800 metres =

Women's 800 metres at the Games of the XXIV Olympiad
- Venue: Olympic Stadium
- Dates: 24 September 1988 (heats); 25 September 1988 (semi-finals); 26 September 1988 (final)
- Competitors: 29 from 19 nations
- Winning time: 1:56.10

Medalists
1st place, gold medalist(s)		Sigrun Wodars; East Germany
2nd place, silver medalist(s)		Christine Wachtel; East Germany
3rd place, bronze medalist(s)		Kim Gallagher; United States

The Women's 800 metres at the 1988 Summer Olympics in Seoul, South Korea had an entry list of 29 competitors, with four qualifying heats (29) and two semi-finals (16), before the final (8) took off on Monday September 26, 1988.

== Medalists ==
Gold	Sigrun Wodars; East Germany
Silver	Christine Wachtel; East Germany
Bronze	Kim Gallagher; United States

== Records ==
These were the standing world and Olympic records (in minutes) prior to the 1988 Summer Olympics.

World record	1:53.28	(Czechoslovakia) Jarmila Kratochvílová	Munich (FGR)	July 26, 1983
Olympic record	1:53.43	(Soviet Union) Nadiya Olizarenko	Moscow (URS)	July 27, 1980

== Final ==
Rank	Athlete	Nation	Time	Notes
1st place, gold medalist(s)	Sigrun Wodars	East Germany	1:56.10	
2nd place, silver medalist(s)	Christine Wachtel	East Germany	1:56.64	
3rd place, bronze medalist(s)	Kim Gallagher	United States	1:56.91	
4	Slobodanka Čolović	Yugoslavia	1:57.50	
5	Delisa Walton-Floyd	United States	1:57.80	
6	Inna Yevseyeva	Soviet Union	1:59.37	
7	Maite Zúñiga	Spain	1:59.82	
8	Diane Edwards	Great Britain	2:00.77	

== Semi finals ==
Rank	Athlete	Nation	Time	Notes
1	Sigrun Wodars	East Germany	1:57.21	
2	Kim Gallagher	United States	1:57.39	
3	Slobodanka Čolović	Yugoslavia	1:57.49	
4	Maite Zúñiga	Spain	1:58.85	
5	Kirsty Wade	Great Britain	2:00.86	
6	Soraya Telles	Brazil	2:01.86	
7	Joetta Clark	United States	2:03.32	
8	Nadiya Olizarenko	Soviet Union	2:05.27	

Rank	Athlete	Nation	Time	Notes
1	Christine Wachtel	East Germany	1:58.44	
2	Delisa Walton-Floyd	United States	1:58.82	
3	Inna Yevseyeva	Soviet Union	1:59.10	
4	Diane Edwards	Great Britain	1:59.66	
5	Gabi Lesch	West Germany	1:59.85	
6	Shireen Bailey	Great Britain	1:59.94	
7	Dalia Matusevičienė	Soviet Union	2:00.15	
8	Letitia Vriesde	Suriname	2:02.34	

== Qualifying heats ==
Rank	Athlete	Nation	Time	Notes
1	Inna Yevseyeva	Soviet Union	2:01.59	
2	Slobodanka Čolović	Yugoslavia	2:01.80	
3	Shireen Bailey	Great Britain	2:02.36	
4	Sharon Powell	Jamaica	2:03.49	
5	Montserrat Pujol	Spain	2:03.73	
6	Choi Se-Beom	South Korea	2:06.65	
7	Assumpta Achuo-Bei	Cameroon	2:07.10	
8	Christine Bakombo	Zaire	2:11.00	

Rank	Athlete	Nation	Time	Notes
1	Christine Wachtel	East Germany	2:00.62	
2	Joetta Clark	United States	2:00.83	
3	Gabi Lesch	West Germany	2:00.95	
4	Mayte Zúñiga	Spain	2:00.98	
5	Mary Burzminski	Canada	2:02.85	
6	Shiny Abraham	India	2:03.26	
7	Maria Mutola	Mozambique	2:04.36	
8	Sheila Seebaluck	Mauritius	2:08.93	

Rank	Athlete	Nation	Time	Notes
1	Sigrun Wodars	East Germany	2:02.24	
2	Delisa Walton-Floyd	United States	2:02.37	
3	Soraya Telles	Brazil	2:02.48	
4	Dalia Matusevičienė	Soviet Union	2:02.57	
5	Kirsty Wade	Great Britain	2:02.75	
6	Maureen Stewart	Costa Rica	2:08.17	
7	Laverne Bryan	Antigua and Barbuda	2:12.18	
—	Sun Sumei	China	DNS	

Rank	Athlete	Nation	Time	Notes
1	Kim Gallagher	United States	2:01.70	
2	Diane Edwards	Great Britain	2:01.79	
3	Nadiya Olizarenko	Soviet Union	2:01.81	
4	Letitia Vriesde	Suriname	2:01.83	
5	Hassiba Boulmerka	Algeria	2:03.33	
6	Renée Belanger	Canada	2:04.74	
—	Rosa Colorada	Spain	DNS	

== See also ==
- 1987 Women's World Championships 800 metres (Rome)
- 1990 European Athletics Championships – Women's 800 metres (Split)
- 1991 World Championships in Athletics – Women's 800 metres (Tokyo)
- 1992 Women's Olympic 800 metres (Barcelona)
