= Ana Fidelia Quirot =

Cuban middle-distance runner and sprinter

Personal information
- Full name: Ana Fidelia Quirot Moré
- Born: 23 March 1963 (age 63) Palma Soriano, Santiago de Cuba, Cuba
- Height: 165 cm (5 ft 5 in)
- Weight: 59 kg (130 lb)
Medal record
Women's Athletics
Representing Cuba
Olympic Games
Silver medal – second place	1996 Atlanta	800 m
Bronze medal – third place	1992 Barcelona	800 m
World Championships
Gold medal – first place	1995 Gothenburg	800 m
Gold medal – first place	1997 Athens	800 m
Silver medal – second place	1991 Tokyo	800 m
Pan American Games
Gold medal – first place	1987 Indianapolis	400 m
Gold medal – first place	1987 Indianapolis	800 m
Gold medal – first place	1991 Havana	400 m
Gold medal – first place	1991 Havana	800 m
Silver medal – second place	1991 Havana	4 × 400 m relay
Silver medal – second place	1983 Caracas	400 m
Bronze medal – third place	1983 Caracas	4 × 400 m relay
Central American and Caribbean Games
Gold medal – first place	1986 Santiago	400 m
Gold medal – first place	1986 Santiago	800 m
Gold medal – first place	1990 Mexico City	400 m
Gold medal – first place	1990 Mexico City	800 m
Summer Universiade
Gold medal – first place	1989 Duisburg	400 m
Gold medal – first place	1989 Duisburg	800 m
Silver medal – second place	1985 Kobe	400 m
Bronze medal – third place	1985 Kobe	800 m
Representing Americas
World Cup
Gold medal – first place	1989 Barcelona	400 m
Gold medal – first place	1989 Barcelona	800 m
Gold medal – first place	1989 Barcelona	4 × 400 m relay
- Updated on 10 February 2014

Ana Fidelia Quirot Moré (Spanish pronunciation: [ˈana fiˈðelja kiˈɾot]; born March 23, 1963) is a former track and field athlete from Cuba, who specialised in the 800 metres but was also successful over 400 m. At 800 metres, she is a two-time World Champion (1995, 1997) and a two-time Olympic medallist (1992, 1996). Her best time of 1:54.44 from 1989 still ranks her seventh on the world all-time list. She is regarded as one of the best female 800 m runners of all time, and probably the best to not have an Olympic gold medal in the event.

== Career ==
Quirot was born in Palma Soriano, Cuba. In 1983, she won a silver medal in the 400 metres at the Pan American Games in Caracas, running 51.83. Four years later at the Pan American Games in Indianapolis, she won both the 400 m and 800 m. In the 400 m, she ran 50.27 to defeat Canada's Jillian Richardson, while in the 800 m she defeated Delisa Walton-Floyd of the US in 1:59.06. Later that year at the 1987 World Championships in Rome, she improved her 800 m best 1:55.84, to finish fourth in a high quality final. She ran onto the leader in the final bend to make a bid for winning the race, but ended up tiring and fading to 4th in the home stretch. The race was won by East Germany's Sigrun Wodars in 1:55.32.

In 1988 she was favored to win the 800 metres gold medal as she went undefeated in the event that season, including winning meetings with her two main rivals and the Olympic Gold and silver medalists Sigrun Wodars and Christine Wachtel, and favored to win a medal in the 400 metres. However, the Cuban boycott prevented her from competing. She was ranked #1 for the year for 800 metres and #4 for 400 metres.

At the 1989 IAAF World Cup in Barcelona, Quirot reached her peak at 800 metres. In a race that was fast from the start, thanks to the front running of World and Olympic champion Wodars, Quirot won in 1:54.44, to move to (at the time) third on the world all-time list behind world-record holder Jarmila Kratochvilova and 1980 Olympic champion Nadezhda Olizarenko. She also won the 400 m, after original winner Marie-Jose Perec was disqualified for running out of her lane. In 1990, she again achieved a 400 m, 800 m double, this time at the Goodwill Games in Seattle. She won the 400 m in 50.38 and the 800 m in 1:57.42, narrowly ahead of the Soviet Union's Liliya Nurutdinova, who ran 1:57.52. She was ranked #1 for the year for both the 400 m and 800 m.

Quirot was unbeaten at the 800 metres for almost three years, from her fourth place at the 1987 Worlds, to the Zurich Grand Prix in August 1990, when she was third behind the East German pair of Wodars and Christine Wachtel. This lone defeat bumped her down tho third in the Track and Field News 800 m rankings, as it was her only meeting with the two women in 1990, after having been ranked 1st in both 1988 and 1989. She did however rank #1 for the year in the 400 metres (for the 2nd and final time) in 1990, making her the only women in history thus far (as of 2017) to rank #1 in the world multiple years in both the 400 m and 800 m.

Going in as clear favorite she settled for a silver medal at the 1991 World Championships in Tokyo, narrowly losing to Nurutdinova 1:57.50 to 1:57.55. The first 4 finishers were within 0.13 of a second and closely crowded in each other's paths at the end, with bronze medalist Kovacs sprawling across the line, blocking the path of 4th-place finisher Maria Mutola who may have otherwise won the race. Quirot did manage a 4–1 record vs Nurutdinova for 1991, and a clear winning record against all her main competitors (although had 5 2nd place losses to 5 different women) and regained her #1 ranking over 800 metres in the final Track and Field News yearly rankings.

Prevented from competing at the 1984 and 1988 Olympic Games due to the Cuban boycotts, Quirot made her Olympic debut at the 1992 games in Barcelona, where she won a bronze medal in the 800 m behind Ellen van Langen and Nurutdinova. Ana had gone into the race as the gold medal favorite, with Nurutdinova tipped as her biggest rival, and Lyubov Gurina, Ella Kovacs, and young Maria Mutola also viewed as real contenders, but the overlooked Van Langen took victory from the favorites, slipping past a tiring Nurutdinova on the inside 50 metres from the finish.

In 1993, she was involved in a domestic accident that left her seriously injured. She was pregnant at the time and gave birth to her daughter prematurely in hospital while fighting for her life. Her daughter did not survive and died a week after she was born.

Quirot returned from her accident in late 1993 and won a silver medal in the Central America Games, behind the Suriname athlete Letitia Vriesde. Then in 1995, at the World Championships in Gothenburg, she became World champion for the first time ever, defeating Vriesde and Kelly Holmes, who were second and third respectively. To gain victory she used a strong finishing kick to move from 5th to 1st down the stretch, something that comes largely from her background of also being a long-time top 400 metre runner. Maria Mutola was heavily favored, having been on a 3-year unbeaten streak, but stepped on a lane marker in the semis, being disqualified. Mutola would be victorious in all head-to-head encounters between her and Ana over 800 metres this year, including the season-ending grand prix final where Mutola would place 1st to Quirot's 5th.

Quirot won her second Olympic medal at the 1996 Olympic Games in Atlanta, winning silver. She went in as one of the top two favorites, along with Maria Mutola, and a battle between the two greats was widely anticipated, with Kelly Holmes also considered a possible gold medal contender. She ultimately defeated both Mutola and Holmes, but ended being pipped for the gold in a major upset by Svetlana Masterkova, who had returned to the sport in 1996, after two years away to have a baby. She was disappointed, knowing at age 33 she had likely missed her last chance of an Olympic Gold, but considered it a triumph after the adversity she had faced to get there. She blamed a poor tactical race on her defeat, and likely lost the race when she allowed Holmes to pass her on the back stretch, slipping back to 4th, rather than responding by moving onto the leader Masterkova's shoulder before the final bend. She would hand Masterkova her only defeat of the year at 800 metres a few weeks later. Track and Field News ranked her #2 for the year at 800 metres, behind Masterkova, but ahead of Mutola.

In 1997, Quirot retained her World title at the 1997 World Championships in Athens, with Yelena Afanasyeva second and Mutola third. She was named the No. 1 ranked 800 m runner for the year for the 4th and final time, and her first time since 1991. She trailed her chief rival Mutola 4–3 in head-to-head meetings this year, but was ranked 1st due to winning more important encounters at the World Championship, Grand Prix Finale, and for going under 1:55 in Cologne.

Quirot is one of only nine female athletes who have run under 1:55 for 800 m, and was the only female to do so over a 25-year span from 1983 (Kratochvílová) to 2008 (Pamela Jelimo). Her best time of 1:54.44 from 1989 ranks her fifth on the world all-time list behind Kratochvilova, Olizarenko, Jelimo and Caster Semenya. She also ran 1:54.82 to beat Maria Mutola in a Grand Prix race in Cologne in 1997. Her lifetime best for 400 m is 49.61 in 1991. In her final year of 1997 she would be ranked #1 in the world over 800 metres by Track and Field News, a feat she had last managed much earlier in 1988, 1989, and 1991. Mutola won 4 of 7 encounters with Quirot that year, but Quirot had the more prestigious victories: World Championships, her sub 1:55 clocking, and the IAAF Grand Prix final.

== Personal bests ==
Event	Result	Venue	Date
200 m	23.07 s (wind: +1.5 m/s)	(Cuba) Havana	6 Aug 1988
400 m	49.61 s	(Cuba) Havana	5 Aug 1991
800 m	1:54.44 min	(Spain) Barcelona	9 Sep 1989
1500 m	4:13.08 min	(Spain) Andújar	3 Sep 1997

== Competition record ==
Year	Competition	Venue	Position	Event	Notes
Representing Cuba
1979	Pan American Games	San Juan, Puerto Rico	2nd	4 × 400 m relay	3:36.3
1981	Central American and Caribbean Championships	Santo Domingo, Dominican Republic	1st	4 × 400 m relay	3:37.90
1982	Central American and Caribbean Games	Havana, Cuba	4th	400 m	52.61
1982	Central American and Caribbean Games	Havana, Cuba	1st	4 × 400 m relay	3:35.22
1983	Central American and Caribbean Championships	Havana, Cuba	1st	400 m	52.89
1983	Central American and Caribbean Championships	Havana, Cuba	1st	4 × 400 m relay	3:34.97
1983	Pan American Games	Caracas, Venezuela	2nd	400 m	51.83
1983	Pan American Games	Caracas, Venezuela	3rd	4 × 400 m relay	3:30.76
1983	Ibero-American Championships	Barcelona, Spain	1st	400 m	52.08
1983	Ibero-American Championships	Barcelona, Spain	1st	4 × 400 m relay	3:38.94
1984	Friendship Games	Prague, Czechoslovakia	8th	200 m	23.61
1984	Friendship Games	Prague, Czechoslovakia	8th	400 m	51.94
1985	Central American and Caribbean Championships	Nassau, Bahamas	1st	400 m	50.96
1985	Central American and Caribbean Championships	Nassau, Bahamas	1st	800 m	2:03.60
1985	Central American and Caribbean Championships	Nassau, Bahamas	1st	4 × 400 m relay	3:34.47
1985	Universiade	Kobe, Japan	2nd	400 m	52.10
1985	Universiade	Kobe, Japan	3rd	800 m	1:59.77
1985	World Cup	Canberra, Australia	4th	400 m	50.86
1985	World Cup	Canberra, Australia	4th	800 m	2:03.57
1985	World Cup	Canberra, Australia	4th	4 × 400 m relay	3:29.34
1986	Central American and Caribbean Games	Santiago, Dominican Republic	1st	400 m	51.01
1986	Central American and Caribbean Games	Santiago, Dominican Republic	1st	800 m	1:59.00
1986	Central American and Caribbean Games	Santiago, Dominican Republic	1st	4 × 400 m relay	3:33.60
1986	Ibero-American Championships	Havana, Cuba	1st	400 m	50.78
1986	Ibero-American Championships	Havana, Cuba	1st	800 m	2:00.23
1986	Ibero-American Championships	Havana, Cuba	1st	4 × 400 m relay	3:33.70
1987	Pan American Games	Indianapolis, United States	1st	400 m	50.27
1987	Pan American Games	Indianapolis, United States	1st	800 m	1:59.06
1987	World Championships	Rome, Italy	4th	800 m	1:55.84
1987	World Championships	Rome, Italy	9th (h)	4 × 400 m relay	3:29.78
1988	Ibero-American Championships	Mexico City, Mexico	1st	400 m	50.54 A
1988	Ibero-American Championships	Mexico City, Mexico	1st	800 m	2:01.52 A
1988	Ibero-American Championships	Mexico City, Mexico	3rd	4 × 400 m relay	3:32.77 A
1988	Grand Prix Final	West Berlin, West Germany	1st	400 m	50.27
1989	Central American and Caribbean Championships	San Juan, Puerto Rico	1st	400 m	50.63
1989	Central American and Caribbean Championships	San Juan, Puerto Rico	1st	800 m	2:02.24
1989	Central American and Caribbean Championships	San Juan, Puerto Rico	1st	4 × 400 m relay	3:34.46
1989	Universiade	Duisburg, West Germany	1st	400 m	50.73
1989	Universiade	Duisburg, West Germany	1st	800 m	1:58.88
1989	Universiade	Duisburg, West Germany	4th	4 × 400 m relay	3:34.53
1989	Grand Prix Final	Fontvieille, Monaco	1st	800 m	1:59.02
1989	World Cup	Barcelona, Spain	1st	400 m	50.60
1989	World Cup	Barcelona, Spain	1st	800 m	1:54.44
1989	World Cup	Barcelona, Spain	1st	4 × 400 m relay	3:23.05
1990	Goodwill Games	Seattle, United States	1st	400 m	50.34
1990	Goodwill Games	Seattle, United States	1st	800 m	1:57.42
1990	Grand Prix Final	Athens, Greece	1st	400 m	50.31
1990	Central American and Caribbean Games	Mexico City, Mexico	1st	400 m	51.70 A
1990	Central American and Caribbean Games	Mexico City, Mexico	1st	800 m	2:04.85 A
1990	Central American and Caribbean Games	Mexico City, Mexico	1st	4 × 400 m relay	3:36.27
1991	Pan American Games	Havana, Cuba	1st	400 m	49.61
1991	Pan American Games	Havana, Cuba	1st	800 m	1:58.71
1991	Pan American Games	Havana, Cuba	2nd	4 × 400 m relay	3:24.91
1991	World Championships	Tokyo, Japan	2nd	800 m	1:57.55
1991	World Championships	Tokyo, Japan	10th (h)	4 × 400 m relay	3:29.78
1991	Grand Prix Final	Barcelona, Spain	1st	800 m	2:01.17
1992	Ibero-American Championships	Seville, Spain	1st	800 m	2:01.96
1992	Ibero-American Championships	Seville, Spain	1st	4 × 400 m relay	3:33.43
1992	Olympic Games	Barcelona, Spain	3rd	800 m	1:56.80
1992	Olympic Games	Barcelona, Spain	—	4 × 400 m relay	DQ
1993	Central American and Caribbean Games	Ponce, Puerto Rico	2nd	800 m	2:05.22
1995	Central American and Caribbean Championships	Guatemala City, Guatemala	1st	800 m	2:01.79 A
1995	World Championships	Gothenburg, Sweden	1st	800 m	1:56.11
1995	World Championships	Gothenburg, Sweden	7th	4 × 400 m relay	3:29.27
1995	Grand Prix Final	Fontvieille, Monaco	5th	800 m	1:57.16
1996	Ibero-American Championships	Medellín, Colombia	1st	800 m	2:02.50
1996	Olympic Games	Atlanta, United States	2nd	800 m	1:58.11
1996	Olympic Games	Atlanta, United States	6th	4 × 400 m relay	3:25.85
1997	Central American and Caribbean Championships	San Juan, Puerto Rico	1st	800 m	1:59.01
1997	Central American and Caribbean Championships	San Juan, Puerto Rico	1st	1500 m	4:18.00
1997	World Championships	Athens, Greece	1st	800 m	1:57.14
1997	Grand Prix Final	Fukuoka, Japan	1st	800 m	1:56.53
1998	Central American and Caribbean Games	Maracaibo, Venezuela	4th	800 m	2:02.46

Awards
Preceded by Florence Griffith-Joyner	Women's Track & Field Athlete of the Year; 1989	Succeeded by Merlene Ottey
