= 1987 World Championships in Athletics – Women's 800 metres =

These are the official results of the Women's 800 metres event at the 1987 IAAF World Championships in Rome, Italy. There were a total number of 32 participating athletes, with four qualifying heats, two semi-finals and the final held on Monday August 31, 1987.

== Medalists ==
Gold	Sigrun Wodars; East Germany (GDR)
Silver	Christine Wachtel; East Germany (GDR)
Bronze	Lyubov Gurina; Soviet Union (URS)

== Records ==
Existing records at the start of the event.

World Record	Jarmila Kratochvílová (TCH)	1:53.28	Munich, West Germany	July 26, 1983
Championship Record	Jarmila Kratochvílová (TCH)	1:54.68	Helsinki, Finland	August 9, 1983

== Final ==
RANK	FINAL	TIME	Notes
	Sigrun Wodars (GDR)	1:55.26	NR
	Christine Wachtel (GDR)	1:55.32	PB
	Lyubov Gurina (URS)	1:55.56	PB
4.	Ana Fidelia Quirot (CUB)	1:55.84	AR
5.	Jarmila Kratochvílová (TCH)	1:57.81	
6.	Mitica Junghiatu (ROU)	1:59.66	
7.	Nadiya Olizarenko (URS)	2:00.28	
8.	Slobodanka Čolović (YUG)	2:02.09	

== Semi-finals ==
- Held on Sunday 1987-08-30

RANK	HEAT 1	TIME
1.	Ana Fidelia Quirot (CUB)	1:57.96
2.	Sigrun Wodars (GDR)	1:58.06
3.	Lyubov Gurina (URS)	1:58.16
4.	Jarmila Kratochvílová (TCH)	1:58.65
5.	Slobodanka Čolović (YUG)	1:58.85
6.	Diane Edwards (GBR)	1:59.34
7.	Essie Washington (USA)	2:02.65
8.	Mary Burzminski (CAN)	2:03.72

RANK	HEAT 2	TIME
1.	Christine Wachtel (GDR)	2:01.47
2.	Nadiya Olizarenko (URS)	2:01.63
3.	Mitica Junghiatu (ROU)	2:01.65
4.	Gabriela Sedláková (TCH)	2:02.27
5.	Delisa Walton-Floyd (USA)	2:02.45
6.	Nathalie Thoumas (FRA)	2:03.90
7.	Maria Akraka (SWE)	2:05.20
8.	Joetta Clark (USA)	2:06.10

== Qualifying heats ==
- Held on Saturday 1987-08-29

RANK	HEAT 1	TIME
1.	Slobodanka Čolović (YUG)	2:02.54
2.	Delisa Walton-Floyd (USA)	2:02.76
3.	Jarmila Kratochvílová (TCH)	2:03.06
4.	Rosa Colorado (ESP)	2:03.40
5.	Soraya Telles (BRA)	2:03.55
6.	Ausa Mwendachabe (ZAM)	2:07.06
7.	Jacqueline Rasaozanamanalina (MAD)	2:11.27
—	Maria Lomba (STP)	DNS

RANK	HEAT 2	TIME
1.	Ana Fidelia Quirot (CUB)	2:01.99
2.	Mitica Junghiatu (ROU)	2:02.23
3.	Nathalie Thoumas (FRA)	2:02.54
4.	Essie Washington (USA)	2:02.61
5.	Selina Chirchir (KEN)	2:02.90
6.	Jennifer Fisher (BER)	2:09.04
7.	Mireille Sankaatsing (SUR)	2:12.02
—	Chakma Sharmila Ray (BAN)	DNS

RANK	HEAT 3	TIME
1.	Christine Wachtel (GDR)	2:01.50
2.	Lyubov Gurina (URS)	2:01.74
3.	Diane Edwards (GBR)	2:02.57
4.	Catalina Gheorghiu (ROU)	2:03.04
5.	Angelita Lind (PUR)	2:04.59
6.	Puseletso Monkoe (LES)	2:22.29
7.	Leticia Thomas (DMA)	2:26.02
—	Andri Avraam (CYP)	DNS

RANK	HEAT 4	TIME
1.	Sigrun Wodars (GDR)	1:59.57
2.	Gabriela Sedláková (TCH)	2:00.23
3.	Nadiya Olizarenko (URS)	2:00.28
4.	Mary Burzminski (CAN)	2:01.62
5.	Joetta Clark (USA)	2:01.81
6.	Maria Akraka (SWE)	2:02.24
7.	Zeina Mina El-Jas (LIB)	2:15.75
—	Kungu Bakombo (ZAI)	DNS
