= Shireen Bailey =

British runner (born 1959)

Personal information
- Nationality: British (English)
- Born: 27 September 1959 (age 66) Kensington, Greater London
- Height: 173 cm (5 ft 8 in)
- Weight: 56 kg (123 lb)

Sport
- Sport: Athletics
- Event: middle-distance
- Club: Bromley Ladies

Shireen Bailey (née Hassan; born 27 September 1959) is an English former middle-distance runner who competed in the 800 metres and the 1500 metres. She represented Great Britain in both events at the 1988 Olympic Games in Seoul. In 1983, she became only the second British woman in history to run the 800 metres in under two minutes. She is also a former English national record holder at the distance.

== Biography ==
Bailey was born in Kensington, London. She was a member of the Bromley Ladies. She competed at the 1982 Commonwealth Games in Brisbane, finishing fifth in the final of the 800 metres in 2:02.41.

In 1983, Bailey was the UK's top ranked woman at 800 metres. In May, she became the British 800 metres champion after winning the UK Championships title in 2:01.36, ahead of Lorraine Baker. In July, she won the WAAA Championships title at the 1983 WAAA Championships in 2:00.58, ahead of Anne Purvis and Christina Boxer. Then on 23 August in Oslo, she ran a personal best of 1:59.54. This made her only the second British woman in history to run under the two-minute barrier for 800 metres. The first being Christina Boxer in 1979. Bailey was the UK's second fastest 800m woman for the next four seasons, behind Lorraine Baker (1984/86) and Kirsty Wade (1985/87). In 1984, her season's best was 2:00.44, but she failed to earn selection for the Los Angeles Olympic Games. She returned to sub two-minute form in 1985, improving her personal best to 1:59.36.

After a slow start to the 1986 season, missing out on Commonwealth Games selection, she improved in the second half of the season, earning selection for the European Championships in Stuttgart, where she ran 2:00.41 in the heats. In the semi-final, she ran 2:00.50 to narrowly miss the final. She achieved her season's best in September, running 1:59.85. In 1987, Bailey had another slow start to the season and missed World Championships selection. She once again found her best form in September. On 11 September, she finished third in the IAAF Grand Prix Final in Brussels, behind Ana Quirot and Slobadanka Colovic. Then on 15 September in Lausanne, she reached her peak at 800 metres, running 1:58.97, to set a new English national record. The previous mark was Christina Boxer's 1:59.05 from 1979. The UK record was held by the Scottish born Welsh athlete Kirsty Wade, with 1:57.42. Bailey's record would stand for almost three years, until Diane Edwards ran 1:58.65 in 1990.

At the 1988 AAA Championships, incorporating the Olympic Trials, Bailey earned selection at both 800 metres and 1500 metres. With the first two in each event guaranteed a place on the team, she secured her place by finishing second to Kirsty Wade in the 800 metres in 2:02.49, before going on to finish second to Christina Cahill (Boxer) in the 1500 metres in 4:09.20. At the Olympic Games in Seoul, South Korea she reached the 800 m semi-finals, running 1:59.94, before reaching the final of the 1500 metres, running a lifetime best of 4:02.32 for seventh, ahead of Mary Slaney and Doina Melinte, who were eighth and ninth respectively. The Seoul Olympics, would prove to be the highlight of Bailey's career. She did earn selection for the 1990 Commonwealth Games in Auckland, where she finished eighth in the 1500 metres final in 4:13.31.

As of 2018, Bailey's 800 metres best of 1.58.97, ranks 11th on the UK all-time list. Her 1500 metres best of 4:02.32, ranks her 16th. She also ranks fifth on the UK all-time list at 1000 metres with 2:35.32.

== Competition record ==
Year	Competition	Venue	Position	Event	Notes
Representing Great Britain / England
1982	Commonwealth Games	Brisbane, Australia	5th	800 m	2:02.41
1986	European Championships	Stuttgart, West Germany	9th (sf)	800 m	2:00.50
1987	Grand Prix Final	Brussels, Belgium	3rd	800 m	2:00.27
1988	Olympic Games	Seoul, South Korea	10th (sf)	800 m	1:59.94
1988	Olympic Games	Seoul, South Korea	7th	1500 m	4:02.32
1990	Commonwealth Games	Auckland, New Zealand	8th	1500 m	4:13.31
National Championships
1983	UK Championships	Edinburgh, Scotland	1st	800 m	2:01.36
1983	AAA Championships	London, England	1st	800 m	2:00.58
1986	UK Championships	Cwmbran, Wales	4th	800 m	2:03.72
1986	AAA Championships	Birmingham, England	4th	800 m	2:05.64
1987	UK Championships	Derby, England	2nd	800m	2:02.38
1987	AAA Championships	Birmingham, England	2nd	1500 m	4:14.52
1988	UK Championships	Derby, England	2nd	1500 m	4:16.23
1988	AAA Championships	Birmingham, England	2nd	800 m	2:02.49
1988	AAA Championships	Birmingham, England	2nd	1500 m	4:09.20
1989	AAA Championships	Birmingham, England	3rd	1500 m	4:11.15
(sf) Indicates overall position in semifinal round

=== Personal bests ===
- 600 metres — 1:26.8 (1985)
- 800 metres — 1:58.97 (1987)
- 1000 metres — 2:35.32 (1986)
- 1500 metres — 4:02.32 (1988)
- Mile — 4:31.45 (1989)
