= Tatyana Andrianova =

Russian middle-distance runner

Sport
- Country: Russia
- Sport: Women's athletics
Medal record
World Championships
Bronze medal – third place	2005 Helsinki	800 m

Tatyana Nikolayevna Andrianova (Russian: Татьяна Николаевна Андрианова, born 10 December 1979 in Yaroslavl) is a Russian former middle-distance runner who specialized in the 800 metres. She did not compete in the 2006 and 2007 seasons, but improved on her personal best time in 800 metres in 2008.

== Career ==
In the 2004 Olympics in Athens, Andrianova was fifth in the final, so in the 2005 World Championships she was a favourite. When she received a bronze medal, she regarded it as a defeat. “I was so upset with that bronze,” Andrianova says. “I was already planning to get married and give birth to my child, and I was not sure I would be back on the track again. I was thinking probably it was my last World Championships. That’s why, when the things went wrong from the very beginning, it made me so nervous”.

In 2006, she had her worst results but after the birth of her son Nikita, Andrianova began training as she was sure that her best results were about to come. In the 2008 Olympics in Beijing, Andrianova was hoping for a medal as she so narrowly missed out in the 2004 Olympics, however, she was placed eighth in the finals.

== Doping suspension ==
The IAAF reported in December 2015 that Andrianova would be retroactively suspended for testing positive for the performance-enhancing drug stanozolol. The test invalidated her results from 9 August 2005 to 8 August 2007. On 14 April 2016 the Court of Arbitration for Sport (CAS) has overturned an Andrianova's two-year doping suspension because her sample was retested beyond the eight-year statute of limitations. "As the eight-year statute of limitations had expired prior to 1 January 2015, the 10-year statute of limitations provided under the new 2015 anti-doping rules cannot apply," CAS said in a statement.

== International competitions ==
Representing Russia
Year	Competition	Venue	Position	Event	Notes
2004	World Indoor Championships	Budapest, Hungary	5th	800 m	
2004	Olympic Games	Athens, Greece	5th	800 m	
2004	World Athletics Final	Monte Carlo, Monaco	7th	800 m	
2005	World Championships	Helsinki, Finland	3rd	800 m	
2005	World Athletics Final	Monte Carlo, Monaco	8th	800 m	

== Personal bests ==
- 800 metres - 1:56.00 min (2008)
- 1500 metres - 4:12.02 min (2005)

== See also ==
- List of doping cases in athletics
- List of World Athletics Championships medalists (women)
- 800 metres at the World Championships in Athletics
- List of people from Yaroslavl
