= Essie Kelley =

American middle-distance runner

Medal record

Women's athletics

Representing the United States

Pan American Games
Gold medal – first place	1979 San Juan	800 m
Gold medal – first place	1979 San Juan	4 × 400 m relay

Essie Kelley-Washington (born January 12, 1957) is an American former middle-distance runner who specialized in the 800-meter run. She was the gold medallist in that event at the 1979 Pan American Games. She also represented America at the 1983 World Championships in Athletics and 1987 Pan American Games, reaching both finals.

At national level at the USA Outdoor Track and Field Championships she was a regular finalist during her career and won the 800 m twice: in 1979 then again in 1987. She was runner-up in 1978 and made her last final in 1990, taking seventh place.

After retiring from running Kelley went into coaching. She had gained a degree in physical education from Prairie View A&M University in 1980, where she also participated in AIAW competition. She served as head coach for the 1999 Pan American Games delegation and was assistant coach on the 1997 Summer Universiade team.

== International competitions ==
Year	Competition	Venue	Position	Event	Notes
1979	Pan American Games	San Juan, Puerto Rico	1st	800 m	2:01.2
1979	Pan American Games	San Juan, Puerto Rico	1st	4 × 400 m relay	3:29.4
1983	World Championships	Rome, Italy	7th	800 m	2:02.65
1987	Pan American Games	Indianapolis, United States	4th	800 m	2:04.66

== National titles ==
- USA Outdoor Track and Field Championships
  - 800 m: 1979, 1987
