= Lyubov Gurina =

Medal record

Women's athletics

Representing Soviet Union

European Championships
Bronze medal – third place	1986 Stuttgart	800 m

Representing Russia

European Championships
Gold medal – first place	1994 Helsinki	800 m

Lyubov Mikhailovna Gurina (Russian: Любовь Гурина; born 6 August 1957 in Matushkino, Kirov Oblast) is a retired middle-distance runner who represented the USSR, the Unified Team, and later Russia. Competing mainly in the 800 metres, in 1994 she became the oldest European Champion at the age of 37. In addition, she co-holds the world record in the rarely contested 4 × 800 metres relay, with 7:50.17 set in 1984.

Gurina is a three-time World Athletics Championships medallist in the 800 metres, with silvers in 1983 and 1993, and bronze in 1987. She also competed at two Olympic Games

== International competitions ==
Year	Competition	Venue	Position	Event	Notes
Representing the Soviet Union
1983	World Championships	Helsinki, Finland	2nd	800 m	1:56.11
1986	European Championships	Stuttgart, West Germany	3rd	800 m	1:57.73
1987	World Championships	Rome, Italy	3rd	800 m	1:55.56 PB
1988	Olympic Games	Seoul, South Korea	16th (h)	1500 m	4:08.59
1990	European Indoor Championships	Glasgow, United Kingdom	1st	800 m	2:01.63
1990	European Championships	Split, Yugoslavia	7th	800 m	1:59.59
1991	World Indoor Championships	Seville, Spain	4th	800 m	2:02.04
Representing Unified Team
1992	Olympic Games	Barcelona, Spain	8th	800 m	1:58.13
Representing Russia
1993	World Championships	Stuttgart, Germany	2nd	800 m	1:57.10
1994	European Championships	Helsinki, Finland	1st	800 m	1:58.55
1995	World Championships	Gothenburg, Sweden	7th	800 m	1:59.16

== Personal bests ==
- 800 metres - 1:55.56 min (1987)
- 1500 metres - 4:02.47 min (1994)

== See also ==
- List of World Athletics Championships medalists (women)
- List of European Athletics Championships medalists (women)
- List of European Athletics Indoor Championships medalists (women)
- List of masters athletes
- 800 metres at the World Championships in Athletics
