= Kim Gallagher =

American middle-distance runner (1964–2002)

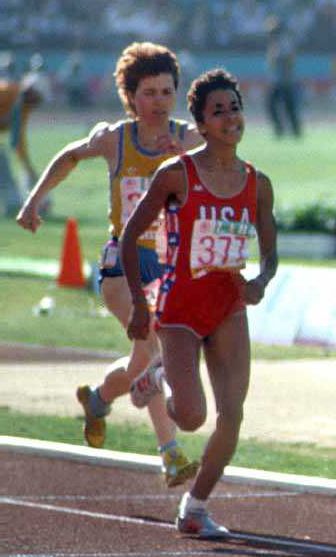
- Gallagher (right) in the 800m final at the 1984 Summer Olympics

Personal information
- Born: June 11, 1964 Philadelphia, Pennsylvania], U.S.
- Died: November 18, 2002 (aged 38) Oreland, Pennsylvania, U.S.
- Height: 165 cm (5 ft 5 in)
- Weight: 47 kg (104 lb)

Sport
- Sport: Athletics
- Event: 400–1500 m
- Club: Puma and Energizer Track Club; Los Angeles Track Club

Achievements and titles
- Personal bests: 400 m – 52.44 (1985); 800 m – 1:56.91 (1988); 1500 m – 4:03.29 (1988)
Medal record
Representing the United States
Olympic Games
Silver medal – second place	1984 Los Angeles	800 metres
Bronze medal – third place	1988 Seoul	800 metres

Kimberly Ann "Kim" Gallagher (June 11, 1964 – November 18, 2002) was an American middle-distance runner who won a silver and a bronze medal at the 1984 and 1988 Olympics.

== Records ==
=== National high school records ===
- 800 Meters – 2:00.07
- 3200 Meter Relay – 8:58.43 (T. Pahutski, K. Baldwin, W. Crowell, K. Gallagher)

=== PIAA state records ===
- 800 meters – 2:05.47
- 1600 meters – 4:41.08
- 1600-meter relay – 3:49.61 (T. Pahutski, K. Baldwin, C. Woldecke, K. Gallagher)
- 3200-meter relay – 8:58.43 (T. Pahutski, K. Baldwin, W. Crowell, K. Gallagher)

== Accomplishments ==
Gallagher was a High School All-American at Upper Dublin High School, Penn Relays Champion, won twelve PIAA gold medals and was a Pennsylvania State Champion in Track & Field and cross-country. She was inducted into the Pennsylvania Track and Field Hall of Fame in 1995 and into the Penn Relays Hall of Fame in 1996.

In 2005, Gallagher was inducted into the Athletic Hall of Fame at Upper Dublin High School as part of the inaugural class.

== Personal life ==
Gallagher took up athletics following her brother Bart, who coached her in her early years. In 1983, she abandoned her studies at the University of Arizona because they interfered with her training. She married John Corcoran of Oreland, Pennsylvania, where the couple made their home.

== Death ==
After the 1988 Olympics, Gallagher was diagnosed with colon cancer. She refused chemotherapy and used vitamins, diet and rest as a remedy, which initially appeared effective. But the cancer reemerged in 1994. In her last years, she used a wheelchair and died from a stroke, aged 38.
