= Mary Burzminski =

Canadian middle-distance runner

Personal information
- Born: 12 November 1960 (age 65) Smoky Lake, Alberta, Canada

Sport
- Sport: Middle-distance running
- Event: 800 metres

Mary Burzminski (born 12 November 1960) is a Canadian middle-distance runner. She competed in the women's 800 metres at the 1988 Summer Olympics.
