= Cian McPhillips =

Irish middle-distance runner (born 2002)

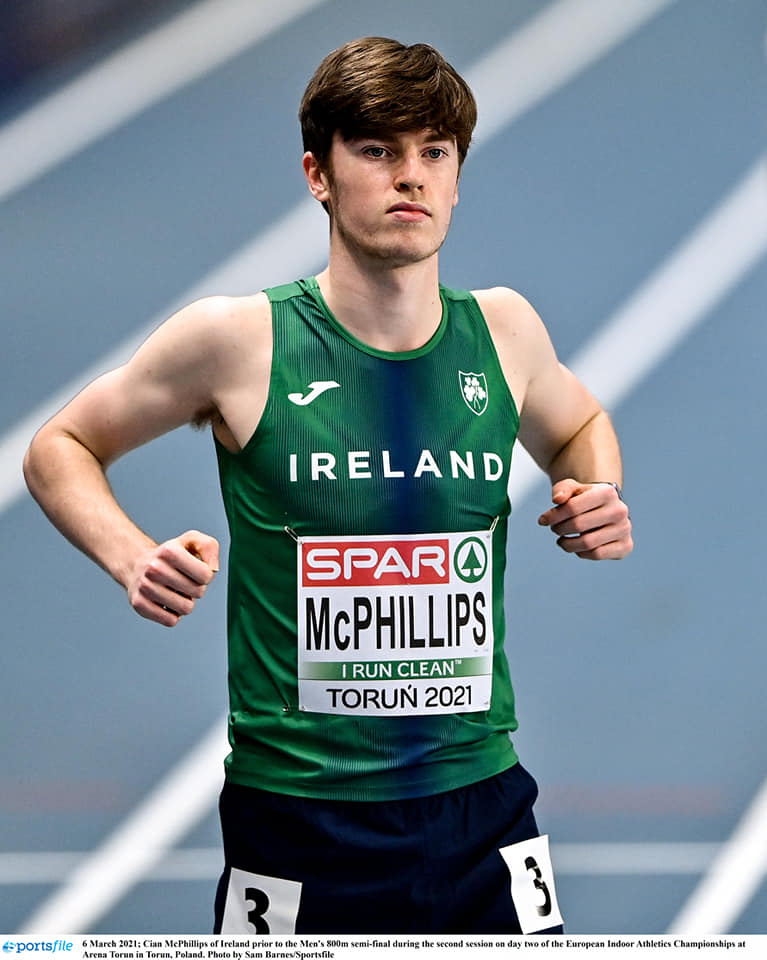

Personal information
- Born: 7 June 2002 (age 24)
- Home town: Ardagh, County Longford
- Education: Moyne Community School; University College Dublin

Sport
- Country: Ireland
- Sport: Athletics
- Event(s): 800 metres 1500 metres
- Club: Longford Athletics Club (former); UCD Athletics Club
- Coached by: Joe Ryan

Achievements and titles
- Personal bests: 800m: 1:42.15 NR; 1500m Indoor: 3:44.85
Medal record
European U20 Championships
Gold medal – first place	2021 Tallinn	1500 m

Cian McPhillips (born 7 June 2002) is an Irish middle-distance runner who holds the Irish national record in the 800 metres.

== Early life ==
McPhillips is from Ardagh, County Longford and attended Moyne Community School where his father was vice-principal. His mother is from Knock, County Mayo while his father is from County Monaghan.

He attends University College Dublin where he studies mathematics.

== Career ==
Cian McPhillips enjoyed much national success as a juvenile competing for Longford Athletics Club, Moyne Community School and also when representing county Longford in the Community Games. Aged 15, he ran 3:49.85 indoors in the 1500m to qualify for the 2018 European Athletics Youth Championships in Győr, Hungary however he eventually missed out on a place in the final. In July 2018, Cian's time of 8:18.91 at the Irish Milers Club Irishtown meet broke the Irish Youths 3000m outdoor record held by John Treacy since 1974. In February 2019 at the AAI Indoor Games in Dublin, he set a new Irish under 18 record of 3:46.42 which knocked some 4 seconds off the old record held by Ciarán Ó Lionáird since 2006. The time qualified Cian for the 2019 European Youth Summer Olympic Festival in Azerbaijan although injury would ultimately prevent him from competing.

He set a new Irish junior indoor 1000m record in Dublin in December 2019 with a time of 2:24.13. That was followed in January 2020 when he ran a new national junior indoor 1500m record of 3:44.85 at the AAI Indoor Games. These impressive performances landed Cian an invite to the Millrose Games in New York by event director, and fellow Longford man, Ray Flynn. There, he put in another commanding run to convincingly win the Boys Mile against some of the top US high school milers.

=== 2021 ===
In February 2021, McPhillips set a new Irish junior 800m record in a time of 1:46.13 when finishing in second place just behind Mark English at the Irish Indoor Athletics Championships. His time was comfortably inside the qualifying standard of 1:48.25 for the 2021 European Athletics Indoor Championships in Toruń, Poland. At the championship, he qualified from his heat in second place before finishing in fourth in the semi-final which was outside the qualifying places for the final.

On 17 July 2021, McPhillips won gold in the 1500 metres at the 2021 European Athletics U20 Championships in Tallinn, Estonia. He placed himself perfectly through the race on the shoulder of the leader before finishing strongly to win in 3:46.55 ahead of Dutch athlete Rick van Riel (3:46.69). The following week, Cian set a new Irish Under 20 record for the 1500m when running a time of 3:40.56 at the AAI Summer Games in Carlow. This took more than two seconds off the previous record held by Ray Flynn for 45 years.

In September 2021, he commenced a scholarship at University College Dublin.

=== 2023 ===
McPhilips ran a 1:45.92 in Ordizia in Spain in June 2023 and qualified for the 2023 European Athletics U23 Championships but suffered a back injury prior to the championships and did not compete.

=== 2025 ===
On 14 February 2025, McPhillips started his season running a 1:45.33 indoors in Boston at the David Hemery Valentine Invitational.

In March 2025, he was tripped in his semi-final of the 2025 European Athletics Indoor Championships and suffered a stress fracture that required 11 weeks off running.

On 11 July 2025, McPhillips ran a PB of 1:44.19 at the Morton Games in Morton Stadium in Dublin and qualified for the World Championships.

On 18 September 2025, McPhillips ran a national record of 1:43.18 when qualifying automatically for the 800m final at the 2025 World Athletics Championships in Tokyo, breaking the record set in the same year by Mark English. He was the first Irishman to qualify for a World Athletics Championships outdoor 800 metre final. In the final he finished fourth in a new Irish record of 1:42.15 in the first 800m race in history in which all eight competitors ran under 1:43.00.
