= Mitica Constantin =

Romanian middle-distance runner

Personal information
- Born: 18 August 1962 (age 63)

Sport
- Sport: Track and field
Medal record
Representing Romania
Summer Universiade
Silver medal – second place	1987 Zagreb	800m
Bronze medal – third place	1987 Zagreb	1500m
European Indoor Championships
Silver medal – second place	1988 Budapest	1500m
Bronze medal – third place	1986 Madrid	1500m

Mitica Constantin (née Junghiatu, born 18 August 1962) is a Romanian former middle-distance runner. She won two medals at the 1987 Summer Universiade.

== Career ==
Constantin (as Mitica Junghiatu) won silver in the 800 metres behind Slobodanka Colovic, and bronze in the 1500m behind Paula Ivan and Svetlana Kitova at the 1987 Summer Universiade in Zagreb. She also reached the 800 metres final at the 1986 European Championships, and both the 800m and 1500m finals at the 1987 World Championships. In 1989, now competing under her married name, Constantin finished fifth in the 1500m final at the World Indoor Championships.

== International competitions ==
Year	Competition	Venue	Position	Event	Notes
Representing Romania
1986	Goodwill Games	Moscow, Soviet Union	3rd	800 m	1:57.87
1986	European Championships	Stuttgart, Germany	6th	800 m	1:59.22
1987	World Indoor Championships	Indianapolis, United States	4th	1500 m	4:08.49
1987	Universiade	Zagreb, Yugoslavia	2nd	800 m	1:59.28
1987	Universiade	Zagreb, Yugoslavia	3rd	1500 m	4:03.04
1987	World Championships	Rome, Italy	6th	800 m	1:59.66
1987	World Championships	Rome, Italy	12th	1500 m	4:12.35
1989	World Indoor Championships	Budapest, Hungary	5th	1500 m	4:09.74
1991	World Championships	Tokyo, Japan	28th (h)	800 m	2:06.53
1993	World Indoor Championships	Toronto, Canada	11th (sf)	800 m	2:05.67
