= Sigrun Wodars =

East German middle-distance runner

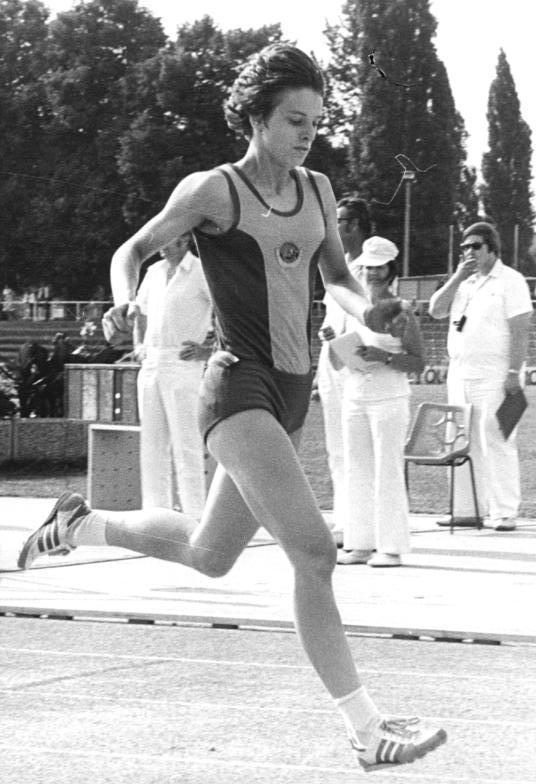
- Sigrun Wodars (right) in 1989

Medal record

Women's athletics

Representing East Germany

Olympic Games
Gold medal – first place	1988 Seoul	800 m

World Championships
Gold medal – first place	1987 Rome	800 m

European Championships
Gold medal – first place	1990 Split	800 m
Silver medal – second place	1986 Stuttgart	800 m

Sigrun Grau (née Ludwigs, then Wodars, born 7 November 1965) is a former East German middle distance athlete who was born in Neu Kaliß, Bezirk Schwerin.

== Career ==
She started out as a 400 m hurdler in Schwerin and finished fourth at the 1981 European Junior Championships. She then switched clubs and changed to the 800 m like her new club mate, Christine Wachtel, who would also become her closest rival.

Now competing under the name of Wodars, she won her first national title in 1986 and placed second at the European Championships in Stuttgart, behind Nadezhda Olizarenko of the Soviet Union.

In 1987, she lost seven out of eight times to Wachtel, but the race she won was the World Championships in Rome, defeating her in a close finish. The two repeated their one-two finish at the 1988 Summer Olympics in Seoul.

Wodars completed her set of major titles by also winning the 1990 European Championships in Split, her last title. She divorced and took part as Sigrun Grau in the 1991 World Championships and the 1992 Olympics, reaching the semi-finals both times. She retired after the Barcelona Olympics and currently works as a physiotherapist.
