= Delisa Walton-Floyd =

American middle-distance runner

Personal information
- Nationality: American
- Born: July 28, 1961 (age 64) Detroit, Michigan, United States

Sport
- Country: United States
- Sport: Track
- Event: 800 m
- College team: Tennessee
- Club: Santa Monica Track Club
Medal record
Representing United States
Women's Athletics
Pan American Games
Silver medal – second place	1987 Indianapolis	800 meters
Summer Universiade
Silver medal – second place	1981 Bucharest	800 meters

Delisa Walton-Floyd (born Delisa Walton, 28 July 1961) is a former World-Class middle-distance runner who specialized in the 800 metres; she was a two-time National Collegiate champion, and two-time U.S. Open champion in her event. Delisa Walton-Floyd represented the United States at the 1987 Pan American Games; winning a silver medal at 800 meters. Walton-Floyd also competed at the World Championships in 1987 and 1991; advancing to the semi-final on both occasions.

After finishing second at the 1988 U.S. Olympic Team Trials, Walton-Floyd reached the pinnacle of her career at the 1988 Summer Olympics in Seoul, South Korea. During a very close final race, Walton-Floyd produced a lifetime best performance of 1:57.80 to finish in fifth place - less than a second from a bronze medal.

Walton-Floyd is a 1983 graduate of the University of Tennessee, where she earned accolades as an All-American track and field athlete for the Volunteers. A native of Detroit and a 1979 graduate of Mackenzie High School, Delisa Walton-Floyd won a total of five individual State Titles - leading her Mackenzie Stags to a State Track and Field Team Championship in 1978. She set the still standing NFHS national high school records in the 880 yard run at 2:07.7. The federation converted record-keeping to metric distances shortly afterward. Fittingly, Walton-Floyd was voted by Michigan sportswriters as 1978 High School Track and Field Athlete of the Year.

In 1991 she was tested positive for amphetamine and suspended. She claimed she took a drug called Sydnocarb which the United States Olympic Committee's Drug Hotline had assured her to be legal after her inquiry. A lawsuit that she filed against the USOC had no success.

== Noteworthy ==
Delisa Walton-Floyd still holds the Michigan high school record of 2:07.7 at 800 meters; a mark that has stood the test of time since 1978. With her personal best of 1:57.80, Delisa Walton-Floyd continues to rank among the top-five 800 meter performers in American track and field history; she is also the current world record holder in both the indoor 600 yard and 600 meter run.

Delisa's husband, Stanley Floyd, was himself a former World-Class sprinter; running the second fastest 100 metres worldwide in 1980 and 1982. Stanley and Delisa have two daughters, Ebonie and Kalyn. Ebonie was an NCAA All-American sprinter at the University of Houston; producing the fourth fastest 200 meters (22.32) in the world during 2007. By virtue of her sixth-place finish (400 meters) at the 2008 US Olympic Trials, Ebonie earned a position on the Olympic Team as a member of the 1600-meter relay squad. Kalyn Floyd was also a sprinter on the UH track team.

== Of further note ==
The 79-year legacy of Detroit-Mackenzie High School includes two alumni who competed in the Olympic Games. Barbara Sue Gilders (a 1956 graduate) represented the United States in the sport of springboard diving at the 1956 Summer Games. Both Delisa Walton and Barb Gilders were U.S. Olympic Trials silver medalists, and Olympic finalists; both Walton and Gilders were Pan American Games medalists who narrowly missed an Olympic medal.
