= Christine Wachtel =

East German track and field athlete

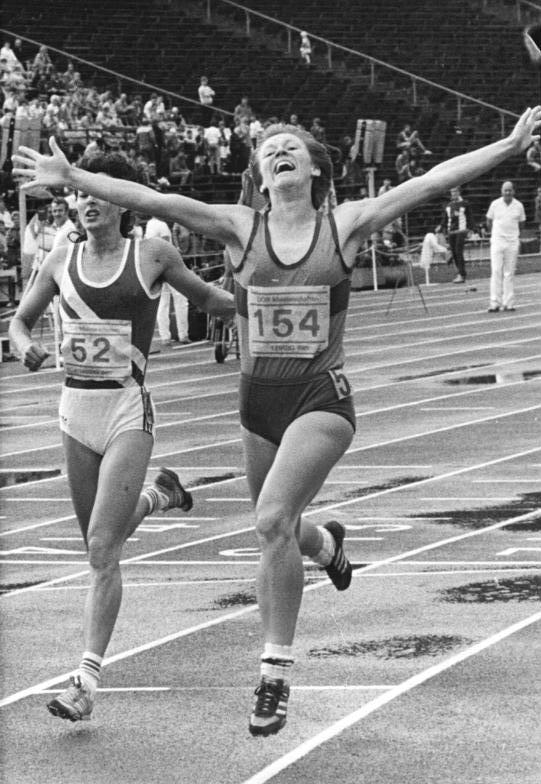

Medal record

Women's athletics

Representing East Germany

Olympic Games
Silver medal – second place	1988 Seoul	800 m

World Championships
Silver medal – second place	1987 Rome	800 m
Bronze medal – third place	1991 Tokyo	4×400 m

European Championships
Silver medal – second place	1990 Split	800 m

Christine Wachtel (born 6 January 1965) is a German track and field athlete who won the silver medal for East Germany at the 1988 Olympic summer games in Seoul in the 800 metres run. Her time of 1:56.64 put her second to her training partner Sigrun Wodars.

== Biography ==
Wachtel was born in Altentreptow, Mecklenburg-Vorpommern

Her earlier successes in the 800 meter run included:

- 1983: Second at the Junior European championship (2:00.42 Min.)
- 1987: Second at the World championship (1:55.32 Min.)

In 1990, she was second at the European championships. (1:56.11 Min.)

Other success in the 4 × 400 meter relay:

- 1991: Third at the world championship with the German 4 × 400 meter relay (3:21.25 Min.).

She also participated in the 1992 Olympic summer games in Barcelona, where she was, however, eliminated in the 800 meter preliminaries.

Wachtel trained at the Neubrandenburg sport club under trainer Walter Gladrow. During her career she was 1.66 meters tall and weighed 66 kilograms. After her sport career she operates a pizza-bakery in Neubrandenburg.
