= 800 metres =

Middle-distance running event

Athletics 800 metres
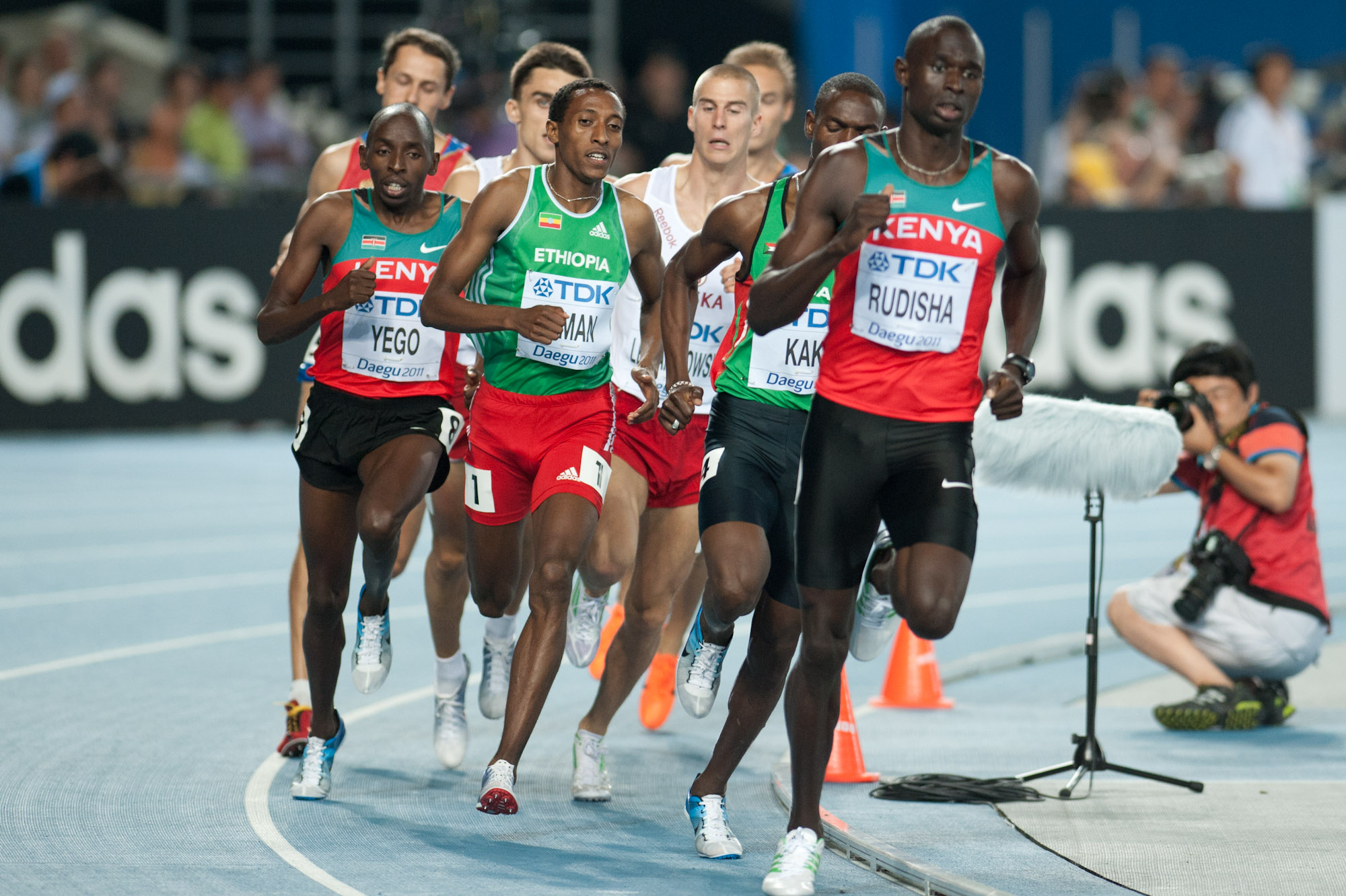
- Men's 800 metres final in Daegu 2011.

World records
- Men: David Rudisha (KEN) 1:40.91 (2012)
- Women: Jarmila Kratochvílová (TCH) 1:53.28 (1983)

Short track world records
- Men: Josh Hoey (USA) 1:42.50 (2026)
- Women: Keely Hodgkinson (GBR) 1:54.87 (2026)

Olympic records
- Men: David Rudisha (KEN) 1:40.91 (2012)
- Women: Nadezhda Olizarenko (URS) 1:53.43 (1980)

World Championship records
- Men: Emmanuel Wanyonyi (KEN) 1:41.86 (2025)
- Women: Lilian Odira (KEN) 1:54.62 (2025)

World junior (U20) records
- Men: Nijel Amos (BOT) 1:41.73 (2012)
- Women: Pamela Jelimo (KEN) 1:54.01 (2008)

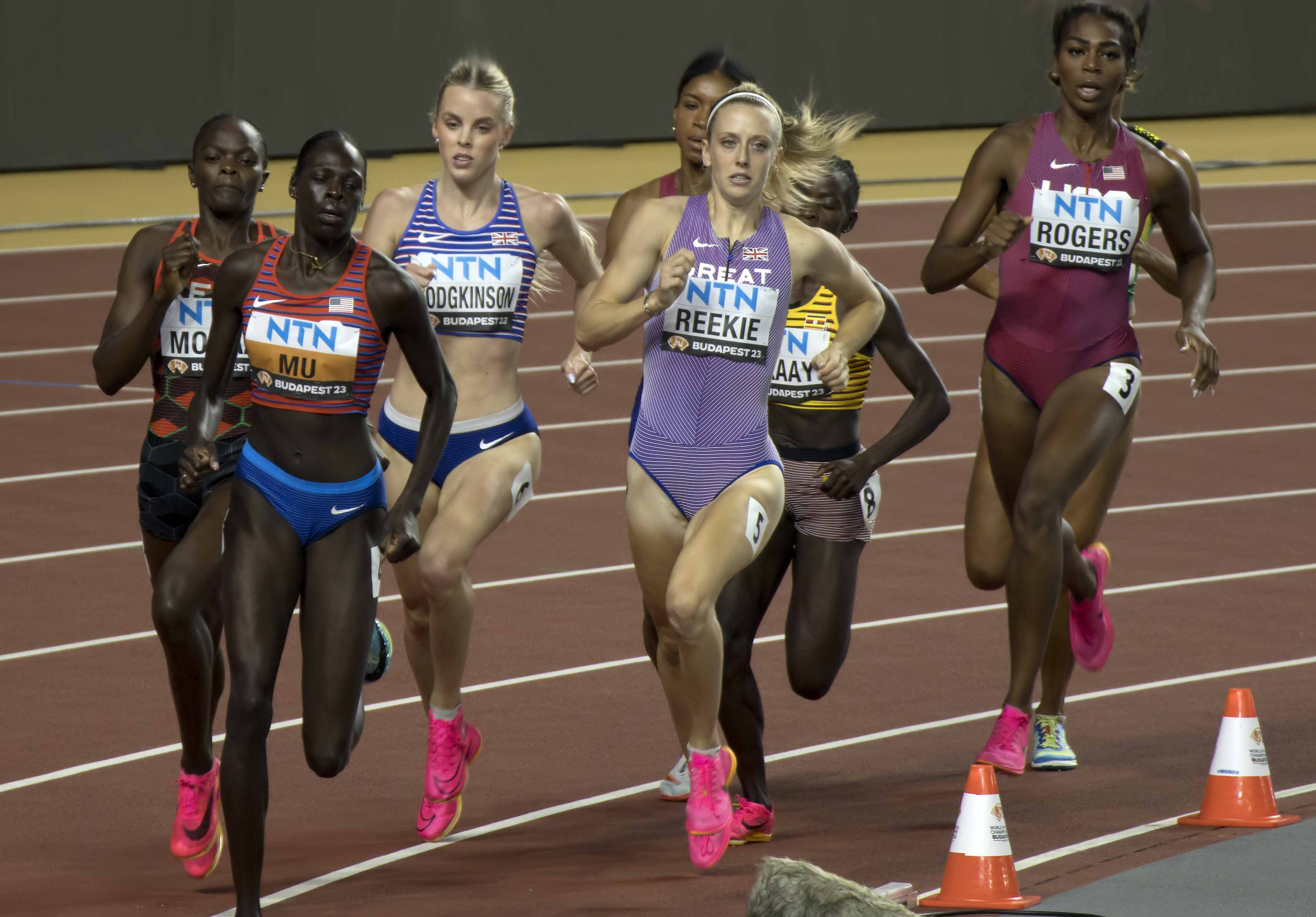
Women's 800 m final at the 2023 World Athletics Championships

The 800 metres is a common track running event. It is the shortest commonly run middle-distance running event, run over two laps of an outdoor (400-metre) track and has been an Olympic event since the first modern games in 1896. During the winter track season the event is usually run by completing four laps of an indoor 200-metre track.

The event was derived from the imperial measurement of a half mile (880 yards), a traditional British racing distance. 800 m is 4.67 m less than a half mile.

The event combines aerobic endurance with anaerobic conditioning and sprint speed, so the 800m athlete has to combine training for both.

Runners in this event are occasionally fast enough to also compete in the 400 metres but more commonly have enough endurance to 'double up' in the 1500m. Only Alberto Juantorena and Jarmila Kratochvílová have won major international titles at 400m and 800m.

== Race tactics ==
The 800m is also known for its tactical racing. Because it is the shortest middle-distance event that has all the runners converge into one lane (after the first bend), positioning on the cut-in and the position of the pack is critical to the outcome of the race. Gaining a front position early in the race is often advantageous as there are occasionally trips when running in a pack. Olympic champions Dave Wottle, Kelly Holmes and others have defied that logic by running a more evenly paced race, lagging behind the pack and accelerating past the slowing early leaders. Often the winner of elite 800m races is not the fastest runner, but the athlete best positioned near the end of the race: an athlete directly behind another runner, has to switch to an outer lane to overtake, so has to run farther—and might be blocked by a third runner alongside.

800 metre participants usually run a positive split, where the first lap is faster, but a negative split is occasionally run as a tactic. The current world record (by David Rudisha) was run with a positive split in the 2012 Olympics. Rudisha ran the first lap in 49.28 seconds and the second in 51.63 seconds. Theoretically, an even split is the most efficient running mode, but it is difficult to pace correctly.

In 2024, the race tactics in the men's 800m shifted toward a more evenly paced race. All fifteen sub-1:42 performances prior to 2024 featured a sub 50 second first lap. However, of the twelve sub-1:42 performances in 2024, six featured a first lap of 50 seconds or slower.

== Area records ==
- Updated 29 June 2026.

Area	Men			Women		
Area	Time	Season	Athlete	Time	Season	Athlete
World	1:40.91	2012	David Rudisha (KEN)	1:53.28	1983	Jarmila Kratochvílová (TCH)
Area records
Africa (records)	1:40.91	2012	David Rudisha (KEN)	1:54.01	2008	Pamela Jelimo (KEN)
Asia (records)	1:42.79	2008	Yusuf Saad Kamel (BHR)	1:55.54	1993	Liu Dong (CHN)
Europe (records)	1:41.11	1997	Wilson Kipketer (DEN)	1:53.28	1983	Jarmila Kratochvílová (TCH)
North, Central America and Caribbean (records)	1:41.20	2024	Marco Arop (CAN)	1:54.44	1989	Ana Fidelia Quirot (CUB)
Oceania (records)	1:42.55	2025	Peter Bol (AUS)	1:57.01	2026	Sarah Billings (AUS)
South America (records)	1:41.77	1984	Joaquim Cruz (BRA)	1:56.68	1995	Letitia Vriesde (SUR)

== All-time top 25 ==
Tables show data for two definitions of "Top 25" - the top 25 800m times and the top 25 athletes:
- denotes top performance for athletes in the top 25 800m times
- denotes lesser performances, still in the top 25 800m times, by repeat athletes
- denotes top performance (only) for other top 25 athletes who fall outside the top 25 800m times

=== Men (outdoor) ===
- Correct as of August 2026.

Ath.#	Perf.#	Time	Athlete	Nation	Date	Place	Ref.
1	1	1:40.91	David Rudisha	Kenya	9 August 2012	London	
	2	1:41.01	Rudisha #2		29 August 2010	Rieti	
	3	1:41.09	Rudisha #3		22 August 2010	Berlin	
2	4	1:41.11	Wilson Kipketer	Denmark	24 August 1997	Cologne	
2	4	1:41.11	Emmanuel Wanyonyi	Kenya	22 August 2024	Lausanne	
	6	1:41.19	Wanyonyi #2		10 August 2024	Saint-Denis	
4	7	1:41.20	Marco Arop	Canada	10 August 2024	Saint-Denis	
	8	1:41.24	Kipketer #2		13 August 1997	Zürich	
	9	1:41.33	Rudisha #4		10 September 2011	Rieti	
	10	1:41.44	Wanyonyi #3		11 July 2025	Monaco	
5	11	1:41.46	Djamel Sedjati	Algeria	12 July 2024	Monaco	
	12	1:41.50	Sedjati #2		10 August 2024	Saint-Denis	
	13	1:41.51	Rudisha #5		10 July 2010	Heusden-Zolder	
	14	1:41.54	Rudisha #6		6 July 2012	Paris	
	15	1:41.56	Sedjati #3		7 July 2024	Paris	
	16	1:41.58	Wanyonyi #4		7 July 2024	Paris	
6	17	1:41.61	Gabriel Tual	France	7 July 2024	Paris	
7	18	1:41.67	Bryce Hoppel	United States	10 August 2024	Saint-Denis	
	19	1:41.70	Wanyonyi #5		15 June 2024	Nairobi	
	20	1:41.72	Arop #2		22 August 2024	Lausanne	
8	21	1:41.73	Sebastian Coe	Great Britain	10 June 1981	Florence	
	21	1:41.73	Kipketer #3		7 July 1997	Stockholm	
8	21	1:41.73	Nijel Amos	Botswana	9 August 2012	London	
	24	1:41.74	Rudisha #7		9 June 2012	New York City	
	25	1:41.76	Wanyonyi #6		27 August 2026	Zurich	
10		1:41.77	Joaquim Cruz	Brazil	26 August 1984	Cologne	
11		1:42.01	Josh Hoey	United States	11 July 2025	Monaco	
12		1:42.04	Mohamed Attaoui	Spain	12 July 2024	Monaco	
13		1:42.05	Emmanuel Korir	Kenya	22 July 2018	London	
14		1:42.08	Aaron Cheminingwa	Kenya	7 July 2024	Paris	
14		1:42.08	Wyclife Kinyamal	Kenya	7 July 2024	Paris	
14		1:42.08	Cooper Lutkenhaus	United States	10 June 2026	Oslo	
17		1:42.15	Cian McPhillips	Ireland	20 September 2025	Tokyo	
18		1:42.16	Donavan Brazier	United States	3 August 2025	Eugene	
19		1:42.19	Brandon Miller	United States	18 July 2026	London	
20		1:42.23	Abubaker Kaki	Sudan	4 June 2010	Oslo	
21		1:42.27	Ben Pattison	Great Britain	12 July 2024	Monaco	
22		1:42.28	Sammy Koskei	Kenya	26 August 1984	Cologne	
23		1:42.29	Max Burgin	Great Britain	20 September 2025	Tokyo	
24		1:42.34	Wilfred Bungei	Kenya	8 September 2002	Rieti	
25		1:42.37	Mohammed Aman	Ethiopia	6 September 2013	Brussels	

=== Women (outdoor) ===
- Updated August 2026.

Ath.#	Perf.#	Time	Athlete	Nation	Date	Place	Ref.
1	1	1:53.28	Jarmila Kratochvílová	Czechoslovakia	26 July 1983	Munich	
2	2	1:53.43	Nadezhda Olizarenko	Soviet Union	27 July 1980	Moscow	
3	3	1:53.70	Audrey Werro	Switzerland	27 August 2026	Zurich	
	4	1:53.80	Werro #2		28 June 2026	Paris	
	5	1:53.98	Werro #3		7 June 2026	Stockholm	
4	6	1:54.01	Pamela Jelimo	Kenya	29 August 2008	Zurich	
5	7	1:54.25	Caster Semenya	South Africa	30 June 2018	Paris	
6	8	1:54.33	Keely Hodgkinson	Great Britain	7 June 2026	Stockholm	
7	9	1:54.44	Ana Fidelia Quirot	Cuba	9 September 1989	Barcelona	
	10	1:54.45	Werro #4		16 June 2026	Ostrava	
	11	1:54.60	Semenya #2		20 July 2018	Monaco	
	12	1:54.61	Hodgkinson #2		20 July 2024	London	
8	13	1:54.62	Lilian Odira	Kenya	21 September 2025	Tokyo	
	14	1:54.68	Kratochvílová #2		9 August 1983	Helsinki	
9	15	1:54.71	Femke Broeders-Bol	Netherlands	27 August 2026	Zurich	
	16	1:54.74	Hodgkinson #3		16 August 2025	Chorzów	
	17	1:54.75	Werro #5		5 September 2026	Brussels	
	18	1:54.77	Semenya #3		9 September 2018	Ostrava	
10	19	1:54.81	Olga Mineyeva	Soviet Union	27 July 1980	Moscow	
	19	1:54.81	Werro #6		14 August 2026	Birmingham	
	19	1:54.81	Broeders-Bol #2		5 September 2026	Brussels	
	22	1:54.82	Quirot #2		24 August 1997	Cologne	
	23	1:54.85	Olizarenko #2		12 June 1980	Moscow	
	24	1:54.87	Jelimo #2		18 August 2008	Beijing	
11	25	1:54.90	Georgia Hunter Bell	Great Britain	21 September 2025	Tokyo	
12		1:54.94	Tatyana Kazankina	Soviet Union	26 July 1976	Montreal	
13		1:54.97	Athing Mu	United States	17 September 2023	Eugene	
14		1:55.05	Doina Melinte	Romania	1 August 1982	Bucharest	
15		1:55.19	Maria Mutola	Mozambique	17 August 1994	Zurich	
15		1:55.19	Jolanda Čeplak	Slovenia	20 July 2002	Heusden-Zolder	
17		1:55.26	Sigrun Wodars	East Germany	31 August 1987	Rome	
18		1:55.32	Christine Wachtel	East Germany	31 August 1987	Rome	
19		1:55.42	Nikolina Shtereva	Bulgaria	26 July 1976	Montreal	
20		1:55.46	Tatyana Providokhina	Soviet Union	27 July 1980	Moscow	
21		1:55.47	Francine Niyonsaba	Burundi	21 July 2017	Monaco	
22		1:55.54	Ellen van Langen	Netherlands	3 August 1992	Barcelona	
22		1:55.54	Liu Dong	China	9 September 1993	Beijing	
24		1:55.56	Lyubov Gurina	Soviet Union	31 August 1987	Rome	
25		1:55.60	Elfi Zinn	East Germany	26 July 1976	Montreal	

==== Annulled marks ====
- Yelena Soboleva (Russia) ran 1:54.85 in Kazan on 18 July 2007, but her performance was annulled due to doping offences.

=== Men (indoor) ===
- Updated March 2026.

Ath.#	Perf.#	Time	Athlete	Nation	Date	Place	Ref.
1	1	1:42.50	Josh Hoey	United States	24 January 2026	Boston	
2	2	1:42.67	Wilson Kipketer	Denmark	9 March 1997	Paris	
	3	1:43.24	Hoey #2		23 February 2025	New York City	
3	4	1:43.63	Elliot Giles	Great Britain	17 February 2021	Toruń	
4	5	1:43.83	Eliott Crestan	Belgium	3 February 2026	Ostrava	
	6	1:43.90	Hoey #3		8 February 2025	New York City	
	7	1:43.91	Crestan #2		19 February 2026	Liévin	
	8	1:43.96	Kipketer #2		7 March 1997	Paris	
5	9	1:43.98	Michael Saruni	Kenya	9 February 2019	New York City	
6	10	1:44.03	Cooper Lutkenhaus	United States	14 February 2026	Winston-Salem	
7	11	1:44.07	Maciej Wyderka	Poland	3 February 2026	Ostrava	
	11	1:44.07	Crestan #3		22 February 2026	Toruń	
8	13	1:44.15	Yuriy Borzakovskiy	Russia	27 January 2001	Karlsruhe	
9	14	1:44.19	Bryce Hoppel	United States	8 February 2025	New York City	
10	15	1:44.21	Emmanuel Korir	Kenya	3 February 2018	New York City	
10	15	1:44.21	Donavan Brazier	United States	13 February 2021	New York City	
	17	1:44.22	Brazier #2		8 February 2020	New York City	
12	18	1:44.23	Mark English	Ireland	3 February 2026	Ostrava	
	19	1:44.24	Lutkenhaus #2		22 March 2026	Toruń	
13	20	1:44.26	Brandon Miller	United States	23 February 2025	New York City	
	21	1:44.30	Wyderka #2		22 February 2026	Toruń	
	22	1:44.34	Borzakovskiy #2		18 February 2003	Stockholm	
	23	1:44.35	Borzakovskiy #3		30 January 2000	Dortmund	
	24	1:44.37	Hoppel #2		31 January 2021	Fayetteville	
	25	1:44.38	Crestan #4		22 March 2026	Toruń	
14		1:44.52	Mohammed Aman	Ethiopia	15 February 2014	Birmingham	
15		1:44.54	Jamie Webb	Great Britain	17 February 2021	Toruń	
16		1:44.57	Adam Kszczot	Poland	14 February 2012	Liévin	
17		1:44.65	Josué Canales	Spain	19 January 2025	Luxembourg	
18		1:44.67	Mohamed Ali Gouaned	Algeria	8 February 2026	Metz	
19		1:44.68	Filip Ostrowski	Poland	24 January 2026	Boston	
20		1:44.70	Colin Sahlman	United States	1 February 2026	New York City	
21		1:44.71	Joseph Mutua	Kenya	31 January 2004	Stuttgart	
22		1:44.72	Ryan Clarke	Netherlands	24 January 2026	Boston	
23		1:44.73	Handal Roban	Saint Vincent and the Grenadines	14 February 2026	Winston-Salem	
24		1:44.75	Ismail Ahmed Ismail	Sudan	26 February 2009	Prague	
24		1:44.75	Samuel Chapple	Netherlands	3 February 2026	Ostrava	
24		1:44.75	Navasky Anderson	Jamaica	22 February 2026	Toruń	

=== Women (indoor) ===
- Updated March 2026.

Ath.#	Perf.#	Time	Athlete	Nation	Date	Place	Ref.
1	1	1:54.87	Keely Hodgkinson	Great Britain	19 February 2026	Liévin	
	2	1:55.30	Hodgkinson #2		22 March 2026	Toruń	
2	3	1:55.82	Jolanda Čeplak	Slovenia	3 March 2002	Vienna	
3	4	1:55.85	Stephanie Graf	Austria	3 March 2002	Vienna	
	5	1:56.33	Hodgkinson #3		14 February 2026	Birmingham	
4	6	1:56.40	Christine Wachtel	East Germany	13 February 1988	Vienna	
5	7	1:56.64	Audrey Werro	Switzerland	22 March 2026	Toruń	
	8	1:56.85	Graf #2		10 February 2002	Ghent	
6	9	1:56.90	Ludmila Formanová	Czech Republic	7 March 1999	Maebashi	
7	10	1:57.06	Maria Mutola	Mozambique	21 February 1999	Liévin	
	11	1:57.13	Mutola #2		18 February 1996	Liévin	
	12	1:57.17	Mutola #3		7 March 1999	Maebashi	
	13	1:57.18	Čeplak #2		10 February 2002	Ghent	
	13	1:57.18	Hodgkinson #4		25 February 2023	Birmingham	
	15	1:57.20	Hodgkinson #5		19 February 2022	Birmingham	
8	16	1:57.23	Inna Yevseyeva	Ukraine	1 February 1992	Moscow	
	17	1:57.27	Werro #2		11 February 2026	Belgrade	
9	18	1:57.43	Isabelle Boffey	Great Britain	30 January 2026	Boston	
10	19	1:57.47	Natalya Tsyganova	Russia	7 March 1999	Maebashi	
	20	1:57.48	Mutola #4		10 February 2002	Ghent	
	20	1:57.48	Mutola #5		15 February 2004	Karlsruhe	
	22	1:57.49	Werro #3		1 February 2026	Val-de-Reuil	
11	23	1:57.51	Olga Kotlyarova	Russia	18 February 2006	Moscow	
12	24	1:57.52	Gudaf Tsegay	Ethiopia	14 February 2021	Val-de-Reuil	
13	25	1:57.53	Larisa Chzhao	Russia	23 January 2005	Moscow	
	25	1:57.53	Graf #3		25 February 2001	Liévin	
14		1:57.67	Sigrun Wodars	East Germany	13 February 1988	Vienna	
15		1:57.80	Georgia Hunter Bell	Great Britain	1 March 2026	Glasgow	
16		1:57.86	Habitam Alemu	Ethiopia	6 February 2024	Toruń	
17		1:57.91	Jemma Reekie	Great Britain	1 February 2020	Glasgow	
18		1:57.97	Roisin Willis	United States	30 January 2026	Boston	
19		1:58.10	Mariya Savinova	Russia	8 March 2009	Turin	
20		1:58.14	Yuliya Stepanova	Russia	17 February 2011	Moscow	
21		1:58.29	Ajeé Wilson	United States	8 February 2020	New York City	
22		1:58.31	Francine Niyonsaba	Burundi	4 March 2018	Birmingham	
23		1:58.34	Svetlana Cherkasova	Russia	4 February 2006	Moscow	
24		1:58.35	Tsige Duguma	Ethiopia	2 March 2024	Glasgow	
25		1:58.36	Addison Wiley	United States	22 March 2026	Toruń	

== U20 records and U18 world bests ==
- Updated 3 August 2025.

Age group	Men			Women		
Age group	Time	Athlete	Nation	Time	Athlete	Nation
U20 (records)	1:41.73	Nijel Amos	Botswana	1:54.01	Pamela Jelimo	Kenya
U18 (world bests)	1:42.27	Cooper Lutkenhaus	United States	1:57.18	Wang Yuan	China

== Olympic medalists ==
=== Men ===
Games	Gold	Silver	Bronze
1896 Athens	Edwin Flack; Australia	Nándor Dáni; Hungary	Dimitrios Golemis; Greece
1900 Paris	Alfred Tysoe; Great Britain	John Cregan; United States	David Hall; United States
1904 St. Louis	Jim Lightbody; United States	Howard Valentine; United States	Emil Breitkreutz; United States
1908 London	Mel Sheppard; United States	Emilio Lunghi; Italy	Hanns Braun; Germany
1912 Stockholm	Ted Meredith; United States	Mel Sheppard; United States	Ira Davenport; United States
1920 Antwerp	Albert Hill; Great Britain	Earl Eby; United States	Bevil Rudd; South Africa
1924 Paris	Douglas Lowe; Great Britain	Paul Martin; Switzerland	Schuyler Enck; United States
1928 Amsterdam	Douglas Lowe; Great Britain	Erik Byléhn; Sweden	Hermann Engelhard; Germany
1932 Los Angeles	Tommy Hampson; Great Britain	Alex Wilson; Canada	Phil Edwards; Canada
1936 Berlin	John Woodruff; United States	Mario Lanzi; Italy	Phil Edwards; Canada
1948 London	Mal Whitfield; United States	Arthur Wint; Jamaica	Marcel Hansenne; France
1952 Helsinki	Mal Whitfield; United States	Arthur Wint; Jamaica	Heinz Ulzheimer; Germany
1956 Melbourne	Tom Courtney; United States	Derek Johnson; Great Britain	Audun Boysen; Norway
1960 Rome	Peter Snell; New Zealand	Roger Moens; Belgium	George Kerr; British West Indies
1964 Tokyo	Peter Snell; New Zealand	Bill Crothers; Canada	Wilson Kiprugut; Kenya
1968 Mexico City	Ralph Doubell; Australia	Wilson Kiprugut; Kenya	Tom Farrell; United States
1972 Munich	Dave Wottle; United States	Yevhen Arzhanov; Soviet Union	Mike Boit; Kenya
1976 Montreal	Alberto Juantorena; Cuba	Ivo Van Damme; Belgium	Rick Wohlhuter; United States
1980 Moscow	Steve Ovett; Great Britain	Sebastian Coe; Great Britain	Nikolay Kirov; Soviet Union
1984 Los Angeles	Joaquim Cruz; Brazil	Sebastian Coe; Great Britain	Earl Jones; United States
1988 Seoul	Paul Ereng; Kenya	Joaquim Cruz; Brazil	Saïd Aouita; Morocco
1992 Barcelona	William Tanui; Kenya	Nixon Kiprotich; Kenya	Johnny Gray; United States
1996 Atlanta	Vebjørn Rodal; Norway	Hezekiél Sepeng; South Africa	Frederick Onyancha; Kenya
2000 Sydney	Nils Schumann; Germany	Wilson Kipketer; Denmark	Djabir Saïd-Guerni; Algeria
2004 Athens	Yuriy Borzakovskiy; Russia	Mbulaeni Mulaudzi; South Africa	Wilson Kipketer; Denmark
2008 Beijing	Wilfred Bungei; Kenya	Ismail Ahmed Ismail; Sudan	Alfred Kirwa Yego; Kenya
2012 London	David Rudisha; Kenya	Nijel Amos; Botswana	Timothy Kitum; Kenya
2016 Rio de Janeiro	David Rudisha; Kenya	Taoufik Makhloufi; Algeria	Clayton Murphy; United States
2020 Tokyo	Emmanuel Korir; Kenya	Ferguson Rotich; Kenya	Patryk Dobek; Poland
2024 Paris	Emmanuel Wanyonyi; Kenya	Marco Arop; Canada	Djamel Sedjati; Algeria
2028 Los Angeles			

=== Women ===
Games	Gold	Silver	Bronze
1928 Amsterdam	Lina Radke; Germany	Kinuye Hitomi; Japan	Inga Gentzel; Sweden
1932–1956	not included in the Olympic program		
1960 Rome	Lyudmila Shevtsova; Soviet Union	Brenda Jones; Australia	Ursula Donath; United Team of Germany
1964 Tokyo	Ann Packer; Great Britain	Maryvonne Dupureur; France	Marise Chamberlain; New Zealand
1968 Mexico City	Madeline Manning; United States	Ileana Silai; Romania	Mia Gommers; Netherlands
1972 Munich	Hildegard Falck; West Germany	Nijolė Sabaitė; Soviet Union	Gunhild Hoffmeister; East Germany
1976 Montreal	Tatyana Kazankina; Soviet Union	Nikolina Shtereva; Bulgaria	Elfi Zinn; East Germany
1980 Moscow	Nadezhda Olizarenko; Soviet Union	Olga Mineyeva; Soviet Union	Tatyana Providokhina; Soviet Union
1984 Los Angeles	Doina Melinte; Romania	Kim Gallagher; United States	Fiţa Lovin; Romania
1988 Seoul	Sigrun Wodars; East Germany	Christine Wachtel; East Germany	Kim Gallagher; United States
1992 Barcelona	Ellen van Langen; Netherlands	Liliya Nurutdinova; Unified Team	Ana Fidelia Quirot; Cuba
1996 Atlanta	Svetlana Masterkova; Russia	Ana Fidelia Quirot; Cuba	Maria Mutola; Mozambique
2000 Sydney	Maria Mutola; Mozambique	Stephanie Graf; Austria	Kelly Holmes; Great Britain
2004 Athens	Kelly Holmes; Great Britain	Hasna Benhassi; Morocco	Jolanda Čeplak; Slovenia
2008 Beijing	Pamela Jelimo; Kenya	Janeth Jepkosgei; Kenya	Hasna Benhassi; Morocco
2012 London	Caster Semenya; South Africa	Pamela Jelimo; Kenya	Alysia Montano; United States
2016 Rio de Janeiro	Caster Semenya; South Africa	Francine Niyonsaba; Burundi	Margaret Wambui; Kenya
2020 Tokyo	Athing Mu; United States	Keely Hodgkinson; Great Britain	Raevyn Rogers; United States
2024 Paris	Keely Hodgkinson; Great Britain	Tsige Duguma; Ethiopia	Mary Moraa; Kenya
2028 Los Angeles			

== World Championships medalists ==
=== Men ===
Championships	Gold	Silver	Bronze
1983 Helsinki	Willi Wülbeck (FRG)	Rob Druppers (NED)	Joaquim Cruz (BRA)
1987 Rome	Billy Konchellah (KEN)	Peter Elliott (GBR)	José Luíz Barbosa (BRA)
1991 Tokyo	Billy Konchellah (KEN)	José Luíz Barbosa (BRA)	Mark Everett (USA)
1993 Stuttgart	Paul Ruto (KEN)	Giuseppe D'Urso (ITA)	Billy Konchellah (KEN)
1995 Gothenburg	Wilson Kipketer (DEN)	Arthémon Hatungimana (BDI)	Vebjørn Rodal (NOR)
1997 Athens	Wilson Kipketer (DEN)	Norberto Téllez (CUB)	Rich Kenah (USA)
1999 Seville	Wilson Kipketer (DEN)	Hezekiél Sepeng (RSA)	Djabir Saïd-Guerni (ALG)
2001 Edmonton	André Bucher (SUI)	Wilfred Bungei (KEN)	Paweł Czapiewski (POL)
2003 Saint-Denis	Djabir Saïd-Guerni (ALG)	Yuriy Borzakovskiy (RUS)	Mbulaeni Mulaudzi (RSA)
2005 Helsinki	Rashid Ramzi (BHR)	Yuriy Borzakovskiy (RUS)	William Yiampoy (KEN)
2007 Osaka	Alfred Kirwa Yego (KEN)	Gary Reed (CAN)	Yuriy Borzakovskiy (RUS)
2009 Berlin	Mbulaeni Mulaudzi (RSA)	Alfred Kirwa Yego (KEN)	Yusuf Saad Kamel (BHR)
2011 Daegu	David Rudisha (KEN)	Abubaker Kaki (SUD)	Yuriy Borzakovskiy (RUS)
2013 Moscow	Mohammed Aman (ETH)	Nick Symmonds (USA)	Ayanleh Souleiman (DJI)
2015 Beijing	David Rudisha (KEN)	Adam Kszczot (POL)	Amel Tuka (BIH)
2017 London	Pierre-Ambroise Bosse (FRA)	Adam Kszczot (POL)	Kipyegon Bett (KEN)
2019 Doha	Donavan Brazier (USA)	Amel Tuka (BIH)	Ferguson Cheruiyot Rotich (KEN)
2022 Eugene	Emmanuel Korir (KEN)	Djamel Sedjati (ALG)	Marco Arop (CAN)
2023 Budapest	Marco Arop (CAN)	Emmanuel Wanyonyi (KEN)	Ben Pattison (GBR)
2025 Tokyo	Emmanuel Wanyonyi (KEN)	Djamel Sedjati (ALG)	Marco Arop (CAN)

==== Medalists by country ====
Rank	Nation	Gold	Silver	Bronze	Total
1	Kenya (KEN)	8	3	4	15
2	Denmark (DEN)	3	0	0	3
3	Algeria (ALG)	1	2	1	4
4	United States (USA)	1	1	2	4
4	Canada (CAN)	1	1	2	4
6	South Africa (RSA)	1	1	1	3
7	Bahrain (BHR)	1	0	1	2
8	Ethiopia (ETH)	1	0	0	1
8	Switzerland (SUI)	1	0	0	1
8	West Germany (FRG)	1	0	0	1
8	France (FRA)	1	0	0	1
12	Russia (RUS)	0	2	2	4
13	Poland (POL)	0	2	1	3
14	Brazil (BRA)	0	1	2	3
15	Bosnia and Herzegovina (BIH)	0	1	1	2
15	Great Britain (GBR)	0	1	1	2
17	Italy (ITA)	0	1	0	1
17	Netherlands (NED)	0	1	0	1
17	Sudan (SUD)	0	1	0	1
17	Burundi (BDI)	0	1	0	1
17	Cuba (CUB)	0	1	0	1
22	Djibouti (DJI)	0	0	1	1
22	Norway (NOR)	0	0	1	1

=== Women ===
Championships	Gold	Silver	Bronze
1983 Helsinki	Jarmila Kratochvílová (TCH)	Lyubov Gurina (URS)	Yekaterina Podkopayeva (URS)
1987 Rome	Sigrun Wodars (GDR)	Christine Wachtel (GDR)	Lyubov Gurina (URS)
1991 Tokyo	Liliya Nurutdinova (URS)	Ana Fidelia Quirot (CUB)	Ella Kovacs (ROU)
1993 Stuttgart	Maria Mutola (MOZ)	Lyubov Gurina (RUS)	Ella Kovacs (ROU)
1995 Gothenburg	Ana Fidelia Quirot (CUB)	Letitia Vriesde (SUR)	Kelly Holmes (GBR)
1997 Athens	Ana Fidelia Quirot (CUB)	Yelena Afanasyeva (RUS)	Maria Mutola (MOZ)
1999 Seville	Ludmila Formanová (CZE)	Maria Mutola (MOZ)	Svetlana Masterkova (RUS)
2001 Edmonton	Maria Mutola (MOZ)	Stephanie Graf (AUT)	Letitia Vriesde (SUR)
2003 Saint-Denis	Maria Mutola (MOZ)	Kelly Holmes (GBR)	Natalya Khrushcheleva (RUS)
2005 Helsinki	Zulia Calatayud (CUB)	Hasna Benhassi (MAR)	Tatyana Andrianova (RUS)
2007 Osaka	Janeth Jepkosgei (KEN)	Hasna Benhassi (MAR)	Mayte Martínez (ESP)
2009 Berlin	Caster Semenya (RSA)	Janeth Jepkosgei (KEN)	Jenny Meadows (GBR)
2011 Daegu	Caster Semenya (RSA)	Janeth Jepkosgei (KEN)	Alysia Johnson Montaño (USA)
2013 Moscow	Eunice Sum (KEN)	Brenda Martinez (USA)	Alysia Johnson Montaño (USA)
2015 Beijing	Maryna Arzamasava (BLR)	Melissa Bishop (CAN)	Eunice Sum (KEN)
2017 London	Caster Semenya (RSA)	Francine Niyonsaba (BDI)	Ajeé Wilson (USA)
2019 Doha	Halimah Nakaayi (UGA)	Raevyn Rogers (USA)	Ajeé Wilson (USA)
2022 Eugene	Athing Mu (USA)	Keely Hodgkinson (GBR)	Mary Moraa (KEN)
2023 Budapest	Mary Moraa (KEN)	Keely Hodgkinson (GBR)	Athing Mu (USA)
2025 Tokyo	Lilian Odira (KEN)	Georgia Hunter Bell (GBR)	Keely Hodgkinson (GBR)

==== Medalists by country ====
Rank	Nation	Gold	Silver	Bronze	Total
1	Kenya (KEN)	4	2	2	8
2	Mozambique (MOZ)	3	1	1	5
3	Cuba (CUB)	3	1	0	4
4	South Africa (RSA)	3	0	0	3
5	United States (USA)	1	2	5	8
6	Soviet Union (URS)	1	1	2	4
7	East Germany (GDR)	1	1	0	2
8	Belarus (BLR)	1	0	0	1
8	Czech Republic (CZE)	1	0	0	1
8	Czechoslovakia (TCH)	1	0	0	1
8	Uganda (UGA)	1	0	0	1
12	Great Britain (GBR)	0	4	3	7
13	Russia (RUS)	0	2	3	5
14	Morocco (MAR)	0	2	0	2
15	Suriname (SUR)	0	1	1	2
16	Austria (AUT)	0	1	0	1
17	Romania (ROM)	0	0	2	2
18	Spain (ESP)	0	0	1	1
19	Burundi (BDI)	0	1	0	1
19	Canada (CAN)	0	1	0	1

== World Indoor Championships medalists ==
=== Men ===
Games	Gold	Silver	Bronze
1985 Paris^{[A]}	Colomán Trabado (ESP)	Benjamín González (ESP)	Ikem Billy (GBR)
1987 Indianapolis	José Luíz Barbosa (BRA)	Vladimir Graudyn (URS)	Faouzi Lahbi (MAR)
1989 Budapest	Paul Ereng (KEN)	José Luíz Barbosa (BRA)	Tonino Viali (ITA)
1991 Seville	Paul Ereng (KEN)	Tomás de Teresa (ESP)	Simon Hoogewerf (CAN)
1993 Toronto	Tom McKean (GBR)	Charles Nkazamyampi (BDI)	Nico Motchebon (GER)
1995 Barcelona	Clive Terrelonge (JAM)	Benson Koech (KEN)	Pavel Soukup (CZE)
1997 Paris	Wilson Kipketer (DEN)	Mahjoub Haïda (MAR)	Rich Kenah (USA)
1999 Maebashi	Johan Botha (RSA)	Wilson Kipketer (DEN)	Nico Motchebon (GER)
2001 Lisbon	Yuriy Borzakovskiy (RUS)	Johan Botha (RSA)	André Bucher (SUI)
2003 Birmingham	David Krummenacker (USA)	Wilson Kipketer (DEN)	Wilfred Bungei (KEN)
2004 Budapest	Mbulaeni Mulaudzi (RSA)	Rashid Ramzi (BHR)	Osmar dos Santos (BRA)
2006 Moscow	Wilfred Bungei (KEN)	Mbulaeni Mulaudzi (RSA)	Yuriy Borzakovskiy (RUS)
2008 Valencia	Abubaker Kaki (SUD)	Mbulaeni Mulaudzi (RSA)	Yusuf Saad Kamel (BHR)
2010 Doha	Abubaker Kaki (SUD)	Boaz Kiplagat Lalang (KEN)	Adam Kszczot (POL)
2012 Istanbul	Mohammed Aman (ETH)	Jakub Holuša (CZE)	Andrew Osagie (GBR)
2014 Sopot	Mohammed Aman (ETH)	Adam Kszczot (POL)	Andrew Osagie (GBR)
2016 Portland	Boris Berian (USA)	Antoine Gakeme (BDI)	Erik Sowinski (USA)
2018 Birmingham	Adam Kszczot (POL)	Drew Windle (USA)	Saúl Ordóñez (ESP)
2022 Belgrade	Mariano García (ESP)	Noah Kibet (KEN)	Bryce Hoppel (USA)
2024 Glasgow	Bryce Hoppel (USA)	Andreas Kramer (SWE)	Elliott Crestan (BEL)
2025 Nanjing	Josh Hoey (USA)	Elliot Crestan (BEL)	Josué Canales (ESP)
2026 Toruń	Cooper Lutkenhaus (USA)	Elliot Crestan (BEL)	Mohamed Attaoui (ESP)

=== Women ===
Games	Gold	Silver	Bronze
1985 Paris^{[A]}	Cristieana Cojocaru (ROU)	Jane Finch (GBR)	Mariana Simeanu (ROU)
1987 Indianapolis	Christine Wachtel (GDR)	Gabriela Sedláková (TCH)	Lyubov Kiryukhina (URS)
1989 Budapest	Christine Wachtel (GDR)	Tatyana Grebenchuk (URS)	Ellen Kiessling (GDR)
1991 Seville	Christine Wachtel (GER)	Violeta Beclea (ROU)	Ella Kovacs (ROU)
1993 Toronto	Maria Mutola (MOZ)	Svetlana Masterkova (RUS)	Joetta Clark (USA)
1995 Barcelona	Maria Mutola (MOZ)	Yelena Afanasyeva (RUS)	Letitia Vriesde (SUR)
1997 Paris	Maria Mutola (MOZ)	Natalya Dukhnova (BLR)	Joetta Clark (USA)
1999 Maebashi	Ludmila Formanová (CZE)	Maria Mutola (MOZ)	Natalya Tsyganova (RUS)
2001 Lisbon	Maria Mutola (MOZ)	Stephanie Graf (AUT)	Helena Dziurova-Fuchsová (CZE)
2003 Birmingham	Maria Mutola (MOZ)	Stephanie Graf (AUT)	Mayte Martínez (ESP)
2004 Budapest	Maria Mutola (MOZ)	Jolanda Čeplak (SLO)	Joanne Fenn (GBR)
2006 Moscow	Maria Mutola (MOZ)	Kenia Sinclair (JAM)	Hasna Benhassi (MAR)
2008 Valencia	Tamsyn Lewis (AUS)	Tetiana Petlyuk (UKR)	Maria Mutola (MOZ)
2010 Doha	Mariya Savinova (RUS)	Jenny Meadows (GBR)	Alysia Johnson (USA)
2012 Istanbul	Pamela Jelimo (KEN)	Nataliia Lupu (UKR)	Erica Moore (USA)
2014 Sopot	Chanelle Price (USA)	Angelika Cichocka (POL)	Maryna Arzamasova (BLR)
2016 Portland	Francine Niyonsaba (BDI)	Ajeé Wilson (USA)	Margaret Wambui (KEN)
2018 Birmingham	Francine Niyonsaba (BDI)	Ajeé Wilson (USA)	Shelayna Oskan-Clarke (GBR)
2022 Belgrade	Ajeé Wilson (USA)	Freweyni Hailu (ETH)	Halimah Nakaayi (UGA)
2024 Glasgow	Tsige Duguma (ETH)	Jemma Reekie (GBR)	Noélie Yarigo (BEN)
2025 Nanjing	Prudence Sekgodiso (RSA)	Nigist Getachew (ETH)	Patricia Silva (POR)
2026 Toruń	Keely Hodgkinson (GBR)	Audrey Werro (SUI)	Addison Wiley (USA)

- ^{^{A}} Known as the World Indoor Games

== World leading times ==
=== Men ===
Year	Time	Athlete	Place
1970	1:44.8 h	Ken Swenson (USA)	Stuttgart
1971	1:44.7 h	Dicky Broberg (RSA)	Stellenbosch
1972	1:44.3 h	Dave Wottle (USA)	Eugene
1973	1:43.7 h	Marcello Fiasconaro (ITA)	Milan
1974	1:43.5 h	Rick Wohlhuter (USA)	Eugene
1975	1:43.79	Mike Boit (KEN)	Zurich
1976	1:43.50	Alberto Juantorena (CUB)	Montreal
1977	1:43.44	Alberto Juantorena (CUB)	Sofia
1978	1:43.84	Olaf Beyer (GDR)	Prague
1979	1:42.33	Sebastian Coe (GBR)	Oslo
1980	1:44.53	Don Paige (USA)	Eugene
1981	1:41.73	Sebastian Coe (GBR)	Florence
1982	1:44.45	Steve Cram (GBR)	London
1983	1:43.61	Steve Cram (GBR)	Oslo
1984	1:41.77	Joaquim Cruz (BRA)	Cologne
1985	1:42.49	Joaquim Cruz (BRA)	Koblenz
1986	1:43.19	Steve Cram (GBR)	Rieti
1987	1:43.06	Billy Konchellah (KEN)	Rome
1988	1:42.65	Johnny Gray (USA)	Zurich
1989	1:43.16	Paul Ereng (KEN)	Zurich
1990	1:42.97	Peter Elliott (GBR)	Seville
1991	1:43.08	José Luíz Barbosa (BRA)	Rieti
1992	1:42.80	Johnny Gray (USA)	New Orleans
1993	1:43.54	Nixon Kiprotich (KEN)	Rieti
1994	1:43.17	Benson Koech (KEN)	Rieti
1995	1:42.87	Wilson Kipketer (DEN)	Monaco
1996	1:41.83	Wilson Kipketer (DEN)	Rieti
1997	1:41.11	Wilson Kipketer (DEN)	Cologne
1998	1:42.75	Japheth Kimutai (KEN)	Stuttgart
1999	1:42.27	Wilson Kipketer (DEN)	Brussels
2000	1:43.12	André Bucher (SUI)	Lausanne
2001	1:42.47	Yuriy Borzakovskiy (RUS)	Brussels
2002	1:42.32	Wilson Kipketer (DEN)	Rieti
2003	1:42.52	Wilfred Bungei (KEN)	Brussels
2004	1:43.08	Wilfred Bungei (KEN)	Zurich
2005	1:43.70	Wilfred Bungei (KEN)	Rieti
2006	1:43.09	Mbulaeni Mulaudzi (RSA)	Rieti
2007	1:43.74	Mbulaeni Mulaudzi (RSA)	Monaco
2008	1:42.69	Abubaker Kaki (SUD)	Oslo
2009	1:42.01	David Rudisha (KEN)	Rieti
2010	1:41.01	David Rudisha (KEN)	Rieti
2011	1:41.33	David Rudisha (KEN)	Rieti
2012	1:40.91	David Rudisha (KEN)	London
2013	1:42.37	Mohammed Aman (ETH)	Brussels
2014	1:42.45	Nijel Amos (BOT)	Monaco
2015	1:42.51	Amel Tuka (BIH)	Monaco
2016	1:42.15	David Rudisha (KEN)	Rio de Janeiro
2017	1:43.10	Emmanuel Korir (KEN)	Monaco
2018	1:42.05	Emmanuel Korir (KEN)	London
2019	1:41.89	Nijel Amos (BOT)	Monaco
2020	1:43.15	Donavan Brazier (USA)	Monaco
2021	1:42.91	Nijel Amos (BOT)	Monaco
2022	1:43.26	Emmanuel Korir (KEN)	Zurich
2023	1:42.80	Emmanuel Wanyonyi (KEN)	Eugene
2024	1:41.11	Emmanuel Wanyonyi (KEN)	Lausanne
2025	1:41.44	Emmanuel Wanyonyi (KEN)	Monaco
2026	1:41.76	Emmanuel Wanyonyi (KEN)	Zurich

=== Women ===
Year	Time	Athlete	Place
1970	—	—	—
1971	2:00.00	Vera Nikolić (YUG)	Helsinki
1972	1:58.55	Hildegard Falck (FRG)	Munich
1973	1:57.48	Svetla Zlateva (BUL)	Athens
1974	1:58.14	Lilyana Tomova (BUL)	Rome
1975	1:59.87	Marie-Françoise Dubois (FRA)	Montreal
1976	1:54.94	Tatyana Kazankina (URS)	Montreal
1977	1:57.39	Ileana Silai (ROU)	Bucharest
1978	1:55.80	Tatyana Providokhina (URS)	Prague
1979	1:56.2 h	Totka Petrova (BUL)	Paris
1980	1:53.43	Nadezhda Olizarenko (URS)	Moscow
1981	1:56.98	Lyudmila Veselkova (URS)	Leningrad
1982	1:55.05	Doina Melinte (ROU)	Bucharest
1983	1:53.28	Jarmila Kratochvílová (TCH)	Munich
1984	1:55.69	Irina Podyalovskaya (URS)	Kyiv
1985	1:55.68	Ella Kovacs (ROU)	Bucharest
1986	1:56.2 h	Doina Melinte (ROU)	Bucharest
1987	1:55.26	Sigrun Wodars (GDR)	Rome
1988	1:56.00	Inna Yevseyeva (URS)	Kyiv
1988	1:56.00	Nadezhda Olizarenko (URS)	Kharkiv
1989	1:54.44	Ana Fidelia Quirot (CUB)	Barcelona
1990	1:55.87	Sigrun Wodars (GDR)	Split
1991	1:57.23	Svetlana Masterkova (RUS)	Kyiv
1992	1:55.54	Ellen van Langen (NED)	Barcelona
1993	1:55.43	Maria Mutola (MOZ)	Stuttgart
1994	1:55.19	Maria Mutola (MOZ)	Zürich
1995	1:55.72	Maria Mutola (MOZ)	Monaco
1996	1:56.04	Svetlana Masterkova (RUS)	Monaco
1997	1:54.82	Ana Fidelia Quirot (CUB)	Cologne
1998	1:56.11	Maria Mutola (MOZ)	Zürich
1999	1:55.87	Svetlana Masterkova (RUS)	Moscow
2000	1:56.15	Maria Mutola (MOZ)	Sydney
2001	1:56.85	Maria Mutola (MOZ)	Zürich
2002	1:55.19	Jolanda Čeplak (SLO)	Heusden-Zolder
2003	1:55.55	Maria Mutola (MOZ)	Madrid
2004	1:56.23	Tatyana Andrianova (RUS)	Tula
2005	1:56.07	Tatyana Andrianova (RUS)	Tula
2006	1:56.66	Janeth Jepkosgei (KEN)	Lausanne
2007	1:56.04	Janeth Jepkosgei (KEN)	Osaka
2008	1:54.01	Pamela Jelimo (KEN)	Zürich
2009	1:55.45	Caster Semenya (RSA)	Berlin
2010	1:57.34	Alysia Johnson (USA)	Monaco
2011	1:56.35	Caster Semenya (RSA)	Daegu
2012	1:56.59	Francine Niyonsaba (BDI)	Brussels
2013	1:56.72	Francine Niyonsaba (BDI)	Eugene
2014	1:57.67	Ajeé Wilson (USA)	Monaco
2015	1:56.99	Eunice Sum (KEN)	Saint-Denis
2016	1:55.28	Caster Semenya (RSA)	Rio de Janeiro
2017	1:55.16	Caster Semenya (RSA)	London
2018	1:54.25	Caster Semenya (RSA)	Paris
2019	1:54.98	Caster Semenya (RSA)	Doha
2020	1:57.68	Faith Kipyegon (KEN)	Doha
2021	1:55.04	Athing Mu (USA)	Eugene
2022	1:56.30	Athing Mu (USA)	Eugene
2023	1:54.97	Athing Mu (USA)	Eugene
2024	1:54.61	Keely Hodgkinson (GBR)	London
2025	1:54.62	Lilian Odira (KEN)	Tokyo
2026	1:53.70	Audrey Werro (SUI)	Zurich

== See also ==
- National records in the 800 metres
