= Nadezhda Olizarenko =

Soviet middle-distance runner (1953–2017)

- Olizarenko leading the 1980 Olympic 800 m final

Personal information
- Born: 28 November 1953 Bryansk, Russian SFSR, Soviet Union
- Died: 18 February 2017 (aged 63) Odesa, Ukraine
- Height: 165 cm (5 ft 5 in)
- Weight: 57 kg (126 lb)

Sport
- Sport: Athletics
- Events: 800 m, 1500 m
- Club: Army Club Odesa
- Coached by: Boris Gnoyev; Svetlana Gnoyeva

Achievements and titles
- Personal bests: 800 m – 1:53.43 (1980); 1500 m – 3:56.8 (1980)
Medal record
Women's athletics
Representing the Soviet Union
Olympic Games
Gold medal – first place	1980 Moscow	800 m
Bronze medal – third place	1980 Moscow	1500 m
European Championships
Silver medal – second place	1978 Prague	800 m
Silver medal – second place	1978 Prague	4×400 m
Gold medal – first place	1986 Stuttgart	800 m
European Indoor Championships
Silver medal – second place	1985 Piraeus	800 m
Summer Universiade
Gold medal – first place	1979 Mexico City	800 m

Nadezhda Fyodorovna Olizarenko (Russian: Надежда Фёдоровна Олизаренко, Ukrainian: Надія Федорівна Олізаренко; née Mushta; 28 November 1953 – 18 February 2017) was a Ukrainian middle-distance runner, competing internationally for the USSR. At the 1980 Olympics she won the 800 m event, setting a world record at 1:53.43, and finished third in the 1500 m. Her 800 m world record was broken by Jarmila Kratochvílová in 1983 but remains the second-best of all time. Only four other athletes (Pamela Jelimo of Kenya in 2008, Caster Semenya of South Africa in 2018 plus Audrey Werro and Keely Hodgkinson in the same Stockholm Diamond League race in June 2026) have come within a second of Olizarenko's mark since it was set.

In 1984, she helped set the current 4 × 800 m relay world record . In 1986, Olizarenko won the European 800 m. In 1988, she failed to reach the Olympics final.

== Biography ==
Olizarenko took up athletics in 1967, together with her sister Natasha, who later became athletics coach. Next year she won the 400 m event at the Soviet Junior Championships, and became a member of the Soviet junior athletics team. She was included into the Soviet senior team in 1977, and debuted internationally as a senior at the 1978 European Championships, where she won silver medals in the 800 and 4 × 400 m relay. Next year she won the 800 m event at the Universiade and placed second at the World Cup. Shortly before the 1980 Olympics, she set her first 800 m world record, running 1:54.85 in Moscow. She improved it in the Olympic final.

Olizarenko took a break after the 1980 Olympics. Earlier in 1978 she married the Ukrainian steeplechase runner Serhiy Olizarenko, and soon after the Olympics gave birth to daughter Oksana.

Olizarenko returned to athletics aiming for the 1984 Games, but those were boycotted by the Soviet Union, and she competed at the Friendship Games instead, placing third over 800 m. In the next two years she won the 1986 European title, placed second at the 1985 European Indoors and European Cup, and third at the 1985 World Cup. At the 1988 Olympics she was eliminated in the semi-finals. She retired from competitions in 1992 and later worked as an athletics coach and administrator in Odesa, Ukraine.

On 18 February 2017, aged 63, Olizarenko died from amyotrophic lateral sclerosis.

Records
Preceded by (Soviet Union) Tatyana Kazankina	Women's 800 metres World Record Holder; 1980-06-12 – 1983-07-26	Succeeded by (Czechoslovakia) Jarmila Kratochvílová
