= 1989 USA Outdoor Track and Field Championships =

- Dates: June 16–19
- Host city: Houston, Texas, United States

The 1989 USA Outdoor Track and Field Championships took place from June 16 to June 19 on the campus of University of Houston in Houston, Texas. The meet was organized by The Athletics Congress.

== Results ==
=== Men's track events ===
Event	Gold		Silver		Bronze	
100 meters (+0.8 m/s)	Leroy Burrell	9.94 MR	Dennis Mitchell	10.03	Andre Cason	10.04
200 meters (+1.0 m/s)	Floyd Heard	20.09	Mark Witherspoon	20.12	Kevin Little	20.39
400 meters	Antonio Pettigrew	44.27	Mark Rowe	44.71	Tim Simon	44.84
800 meters	Johnny Gray	1:46.17	Stanley Redwine	1:46.64	Jack Armour	1:46.67
1500 meters	Terrance Herrington	3:46.83	Jeff Atkinson	3:47.25	Steve Scott	3:47.48
5000 meters	Tim Hacker	13:39.75	Keith Brantly	13:40.20	Doug Padilla	13:40.76
10,000 meters	Pat Porter	28:45.78	Bob Kempainen	28:50.95	John Scherer	28:58.18
110 meters hurdles (+0.9 m/s)	Roger Kingdom	13.22	Jack Pierce	13.40	Courtney Hawkins	13.48
400 meters hurdles	David Patrick	48.83	Kevin Henderson	49.05	Reggie Davis	49.06
3000 meters steeplechase	Brian Diemer	8:26.45	Brian Abshire	8:29.96	Ivan Huff	8:30.29
20 kilometres race walk	Tim Lewis	1:27:19	Gary Morgan	1:28:06	Mark Manning	1:30:23

=== Men's field events ===
Event	Gold		Silver		Bronze	
High jump	Brian Brown	2.32 m (7 ft 7 1/4 in)	Hollis Conway	2.29 m (7 ft 6 in)	Jim Howard	2.29 m (7 ft 6 in)
Pole vault	Kory Tarpenning	5.79 m (18 ft 11 3/4 in)	Tim Bright	5.79 m (18 ft 11 3/4 in)	Doug Fraley	5.69 m (18 ft 8 in)
Long jump	Larry Myricks	8.70 m (28 ft 6 1/2 in)	Mike Powell	8.52 m (27 ft 11 1/4 in)w	Llewellyn Starks	8.48 m (27 ft 9 3/4 in)w
Triple jump	Mike Conley	17.50 m (57 ft 4 3/4 in)	Charlie Simpkins	16.99 m (55 ft 8 3/4 in)	Joe Greene	16.88 m (55 ft 4 1/2 in)
Shot put	Randy Barnes	21.57 m (70 ft 9 in)	Jim Doehring	20.73 m (68 ft 0 in)	Mike Stulce	20.72 m (67 ft 11 1/2 in)
Discus throw	Kamy Keshmiri	66.50 m (218 ft 2 in)	Mike Buncic	66.34 m (217 ft 7 in)	Goran Svensson	65.74 m (215 ft 8 in)
Hammer throw	Lance Deal	76.94 m (252 ft 5 in)	Ken Flax	76.80 m (251 ft 11 in)	Jud Logan	76.30 m (250 ft 3 in)
Javelin throw	Mike Barnett	78.26 m (256 ft 9 in)	Duncan Atwood	75.48 m (247 ft 7 in)	Dave Stephens	74.42 m (244 ft 1 in)
Decathlon	Dave Johnson	8549	Sheldon Blockburger	8248w	Gary Kinder	8155w

=== Women's track events ===
Event	Gold		Silver		Bronze	
100 meters (+1.6 m/s)	Dawn Sowell	11.12	Sheila Echols	11.13	Esther Jones	11.14
200 meters (+1.3 m/s)	Dannette Young	22.29	Esther Jones	22.53	Diane Dixon	22.72
400 meters	Rochelle Stevens	51.52	Jearl Miles	51.55	Celena Mondie-Milner	51.64
800 meters	Joetta Clark	02:01.42	Debbie Grant	02:01.99	Meredith Rainey	02:02.90
1500 meters	Regina Jacobs	04:11.80	Suzy Favor Hamilton	04:12.29	Diana Richburg	04:12.32
3000 meters	PattiSue Plumer	09:00.05	Sabrina Dornhoefer	09:00.23	Gwyn Coogan	09:12.17
5000 meters	Mindy Schmidt	16:12.36	Lisa Stone	16:20.94	Ann Henderson	16:34.06
10,000 meters	Nan Davis	32:34.59	Colette Murphy	32:54.86	Judy Chamberlin	32:56.06
100 meters hurdles (+0.1 m/s)	Lynda Tolbert	12.75 CR	Kim McKenzie	12.91	Candy Young	13.15
400 meters hurdles	Sandra Farmer-Patrick	53.75 AR,CR	Victoria Fulcher	55.87	Janeene Vickers	56.01
10 kilometres race walk	Lynn Weik	46:44.1 AR,CR	Teresa Vaill	47:21.9	Maryanne Torrellas	48:25.7

=== Women's field events ===
Event	Gold		Silver		Bronze	
High jump	Jan Wohlschlag	6-4 m (6 ft 6 1/2 in)	Louise Ritter	6-4 m (6 ft 6 1/2 in)	Shelley Nixon	6-2.75 m (10 ft 7 3/4 in)
Long jump	Claire Connor	21-6 m (49 ft 2 1/2 in)	Sheila Echols	21-5.5 m (50 ft 10 in)	Gwen Loud	21-3.5 m (57 ft 4 3/4 in)
Triple jump	Sheila Hudson	13.88 m (45 ft 6 1/4 in)w	Diana Orrange	13.35 m (43 ft 9 1/2 in)w	Renita Robinson	13.15 m (43 ft 1 1/2 in)w
Shot put	Ramona Pagel	18.91 m (62 ft 1/4 in)	Connie Price-Smith	18.00 m (59 ft 1/2 in)	Bonnie Dasse	17.41 m (57 ft 1 1/4 in)
Discus throw	Connie Price-Smith	61.54 m (201 ft 10 in)	Lacy Barnes-Mileham	59.36 m (194 ft 9 in)	Ramona Pagel	57.96 m (190 ft 1 in)
Javelin throw	Laverne Eve Bahamas; Donna Mayhew	64.78 m (212 ft 6 in); 60.80 m (199 ft 5 in)	Karin Smith	57.30 m (187 ft 11 in)	Marilyn Senz	55.24 m (181 ft 2 in)
Heptathlon	Jolanda Jones	6006w	Gea Johnson	5990w	Sharon Hanson	5983w

== See also ==
- United States Olympic Trials (track and field)
