= 1991 USA Outdoor Track and Field Championships =

- Dates: June 13–15
- Host city: New York City, United States
- Venue: Downing Stadium

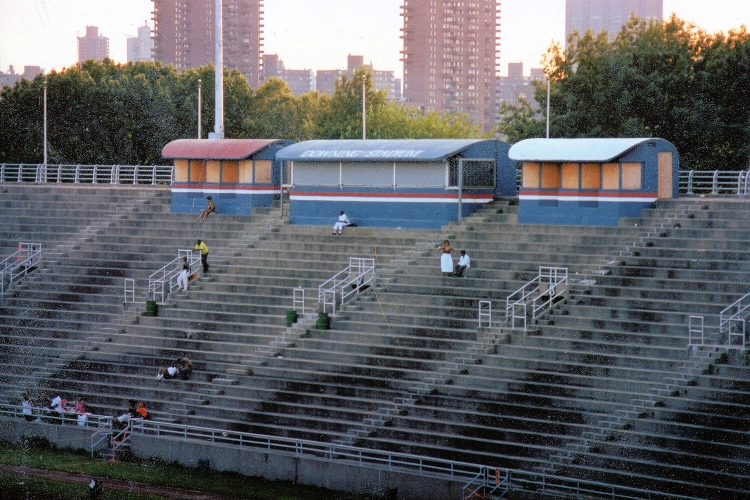
Downing Stadium hosted the 1991 competition

The 1991 USA Outdoor Track and Field Championships took place between June 13–15 at Downing Stadium on Randall's Island in New York City. This was the last USA Outdoor Track and Field Championships organized by The Athletics Congress. The following year's Olympic Trials served as the National Championships during the last year of TAC's existence. The competition acted as a way of selecting the United States team for the 1991 World Championships in Athletics in Tokyo, Japan August 23 to September 1 later that year.

== Results ==
=== Men track events ===
Event	Gold		Silver		Bronze	
100 meters (+1.9 m/s)	Leroy Burrell	9.90 WR, AR, CR	Carl Lewis	9.93	Dennis Mitchell	10.00
200 meters (-2.0 m/s)	Michael Johnson	20.31	Leroy Burrell	20.42	Floyd Heard	20.44
400 meters	Antonio Pettigrew	44.36	Andrew Valmon	44.68	Quincy Watts	44.98
800 meters	Mark Everett	1:44.28	George Kersh	1:44.71	Johnny Gray	1:44.83
1500 meters	Terrance Herrington	3:40.72	Steve Scott	3:41.14	Joe Falcon	3:41.30
5000 meters	John Trautmann	13:55.26	Reuben Reina	13:56.00	Bob Kennedy	13:58.02
10,000 meters	Shannon Butler	28:09.40	Steve Plasencia	28:12.60	Aaron Ramirez	28:16.59
110 meters hurdles (+1.0 m/s)	Greg Foster	13.13	Jack Pierce	13.23	Renaldo Nehemiah	13.30
400 meters hurdles	Danny Harris	47.62	Kevin Young	47.94	Derrick Adkins	48.60
3000 meters steeplechase	Mark Croghan	8:21.64	Dan Nelson	8:22.90	Brian Diemer	8:23.34
20 kilometres race walk road	Tim Lewis	1:29:55	Gary Morgan	1:30:21	Dave McGovern	1:30:54

=== Men field events ===
Event	Gold		Silver		Bronze	
High jump	Hollis Conway	2.32 m (7 ft 7 1/4 in)	Charles Austin	2.29 m (7 ft 6 in)	Rick Noji	2.29 m (7 ft 6 in)
Pole vault	Tim Bright	5.70 m (18 ft 8 1/4 in)	Joe Dial	5.65 m (18 ft 6 1/4 in)	Kelly Riley	5.60 m (18 ft 4 1/4 in)
Long jump	Carl Lewis	8.64 m (28 ft 4 in)	Mike Powell	8.63 m (28 ft 3 3/4 in)	Larry Myricks	8.49 m (27 ft 10 1/4 in)
Triple jump	Kenny Harrison	17.32 m (56 ft 9 3/4 in)	Mike Conley	17.03 m (55 ft 10 1/4 in)	Don Parish	16.95 m (55 ft 7 1/4 in)
Shot put	Ron Backes	19.80 m (64 ft 11 1/2 in)	C. J. Hunter	19.56 m (64 ft 2 in)	Dave Wilson	19.06 m (62 ft 6 1/4 in)
Discus throw	Anthony Washington	64.60 m (211 ft 11 in)	Mike Buncic	64.56 m (211 ft 9 in)	Mike Gravelle	61.64 m (202 ft 2 in)
Hammer throw	Jud Logan	74.62 m (244 ft 9 in)	Lance Deal	74.26 m (243 ft 7 in)	Ken Flax	74.26 m (243 ft 7 in)
Javelin throw	Mike Barnett	79.86 m (262 ft 0 in)	Dave Stephens	78.84 m (258 ft 7 in)	Tom Pukstys	77.96 m (255 ft 9 in)
Decathlon	Dan O'Brien	8844w	Dave Johnson	8467 MR	Rob Muzzio	8119

=== Women track events ===
Event	Gold		Silver		Bronze	
100 meters (+1.0 m/s)	Carlette Guidry	11.02	Gwen Torrence	11.12	Evelyn Ashford	11.22
200 meters (-0.6 m/s)	Gwen Torrence	22.38	Dannette Young	22.44	Esther Jones	22.72
400 meters	Lillie Leatherwood	49.66 CR	Jearl Miles	50.19	Diane Dixon	50.30
800 meters	Delisa Floyd	1:59.82	Meredith Rainey	1:59.87	Joetta Clark	2:00.48
1500 meters	Suzy Favor Hamilton	4:06.13	PattiSue Plumer	4:06.59	Darcy Arreola	4:09.32
3000 meters	Shelly Steely	8:49.00	Annette Peters	8:52.07	Judi St. Hilaire	8:52.66
5000 meters	PattiSue Plumer	16:24.72	Kelly McNee	16:35.65	Betsy Schmid	16:38.98
10,000 meters	Lynn Jennings	32:45.88	Francie Larrieu Smith	32:50.00	Anne Marie Lauck	32:50.37
100 meters hurdles (+1.4 m/s)	Gail Devers	12.83	Dawn Bowles	12.89	Arnita Myricks	12.99
400 meters hurdles	Kim Batten	54.18	Sandra Farmer-Patrick	54.72	Janeene Vickers	54.89
2000 meters steeplechase	Teresa DiPerna	7:12.8	Marisa Sutera	7:20.1	Martha Obidinski	7:47.4
10 kilometres race walk	Debbi Lawrence	46:06.4 AR, CR	Lynn Weik	46:12.8	Victoria Herazo	46:26.5

=== Women field events ===
Event	Gold		Silver		Bronze	
High jump	Yolanda Henry	6-4.75 m (4 ft 1 in)	Sue Rembao	6-3.5 m (8 ft 2 1/4 in)	Tisha Waller	6-2.25 m (12 ft 3 1/2 in)
Long jump	Jackie Joyner-Kersee	6.91 m (22 ft 8 in)	Sheila Echols	6.69 m (21 ft 11 1/4 in)w	Cindy Greiner	6.63 m (21 ft 9 in)
Triple jump	Carla Shannon	13.52 m (44 ft 4 1/4 in)	Sheila Hudson	13.45 m (44 ft 1 1/2 in)w	Donna Crumety	13.43 m (44 ft 1/2 in)
Shot put	Ramona Pagel	18.35 m (60 ft 2 1/4 in)	Connie Price-Smith	17.85 m (58 ft 6 3/4 in)	Pam Dukes	17.20 m (56 ft 5 in)
Discus throw	Lacy Barnes-Mileham	60.90 m (199 ft 9 in)	Pam Dukes	58.24 m (191 ft 0 in)	Penny Neer	58.16 m (190 ft 9 in)
Hammer throw	Bonnie Edmondson	51.51 m (168 ft 11 in)	Pam Dukes	49.83 m (163 ft 5 in)	Sonja Fitts	49.50 m (162 ft 4 in)
Javelin throw	Karin Smith	60.20 m (197 ft 6 in)	Paula Berry	58.39 m (191 ft 6 in)	Donna Mayhew	57.32 m (188 ft 0 in)
Heptathlon	Jackie Joyner-Kersee	6878	Cindy Greiner	6186	Kym Carter	6183

== See also ==
- United States Olympic Trials (track and field)
