= 1990 USA Outdoor Track and Field Championships =

- Dates: June 16–19
- Host city: Norwalk, California, United States
- Venue: Falcon Stadium, Cerritos College

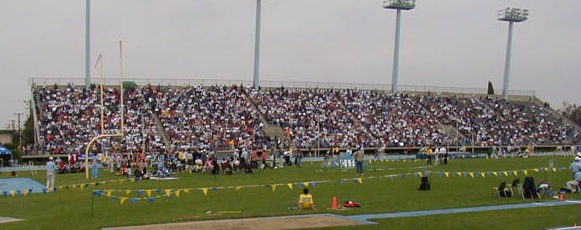
Falcon Stadium hosted the 1990 competition

The 1990 USA Outdoor Track and Field Championships took place between June 16–19 at Falcon Stadium on the campus of Cerritos College. The portion of the campus where the track lies is in the city of Norwalk, California. The meet was organized by The Athletics Congress.

== Results ==
=== Men track events ===
Event	Gold		Silver		Bronze	
100 meters (+0.6 m/s)	Carl Lewis	10.05	Mark Witherspoon	10.25	Dennis Mitchell	10.26
200 meters (+0.3 m/s)	Michael Johnson	19.9	Danny Everett	20.08	Daron Council	20.39
400 meters	Steve Lewis	44.75	Tim Simon	44.89	Clarence Daniel	44.95
800 meters	Mark Everett	1:45.01	George Kersh	1:45.21	Johnny Gray	1:45.32
1500 meters	Joe Falcon	3:37.49	Maurice Smith	3:38.56	Steve Ave	3:39.41
5000 meters	Doug Padilla	13:41.85	Bob Kennedy	13:42.80	Reuben Reina	13:43.63
10,000 meters	Steve Plasencia	28:11.41	Aaron Ramirez	28:11.99	Ed Eyestone	28:16.20
110 meters hurdles (+1.5 m/s)	Roger Kingdom	13.29	Anthony Dees	13.33	Cletus Clark	13.36
400 meters hurdles	David Patrick	48.79	Kevin Young	49.56	George Porter	49.77
3000 meters steeplechase	Brian Diemer	8:24.79	Mark Croghan	8:25.99	Brian Abshire	8:31.19
20 kilometres race walk	Tim Lewis	1:27:28	Doug Fournier	1:28:27	Steve Pecinovsky	1:29:02

=== Men field events ===
Event	Gold		Silver		Bronze	
High jump	Hollis Conway	2.36 m (7 ft 8 3/4 in) MR	Doug Nordquist	2.36 m (7 ft 8 3/4 in) =MR	John Morris	2.32 m (7 ft 7 1/4 in)
Pole vault	Earl Bell	5.74 m (18 ft 9 3/4 in)	Tim Bright	5.66 m (18 ft 6 3/4 in)	Greg Duplantis	5.50 m (18 ft 1/2 in)
Long jump	Mike Powell	8.24 m (27 ft 1/4 in)	Andre Ester	8.11 m (26 ft 7 1/4 in)w	Llewellyn Starks	8.09 m (26 ft 6 1/2 in)
Triple jump	Kenny Harrison	17.15 m (56 ft 3 in)	Mike Conley	17.12 m (56 ft 2 in)	Charlie Simpkins	16.66 m (54 ft 7 3/4 in)
Shot put	Jim Doehring	21.28 m (69 ft 9 3/4 in)	Randy Barnes	21.12 m (69 ft 3 1/4 in)	Ron Backes	20.35 m (66 ft 9 in)
Discus throw	Kamy Keshmiri	62.30 m (204 ft 4 in)	Mike Buncic	61.54 m (201 ft 10 in)	Randy Heisler	60.70 m (199 ft 1 in)
Hammer throw	Ken Flax	76.04 m (249 ft 5 in)	Jud Logan	75.24 m (246 ft 10 in)	Lance Deal	74.26 m (243 ft 7 in)
Javelin throw	Vince Labosky	79.62 m (261 ft 2 in)	Dave Stephens	77.24 m (253 ft 4 in)	Mike Barnett	77.16 m (253 ft 1 in)
Decathlon	Dave Johnson	8600w	Dan O'Brien	8483w	Sheldon Blockburger	8301w

=== Women track events ===
Event	Gold		Silver		Bronze	
100 meters (+1.0 m/s)	Michelle Finn	11.20	Carlette Guidry	11.25	Evelyn Ashford	11.30
200 meters (+0.5 m/s)	Grace Jackson (Jamaica)	222.48	Dannette Young-Stone	22.55	Pauline Davis (The Bahamas)	22.75
400 meters	Maicel Malone	51.51	Rochelle Stevens	51.60	Lillie Leatherwood	51.69
800 meters	Meredith Valmon	2:00.70	Julie Jenkins	2:00.91	Joetta Clark Diggs	2:01.14
1500 meters	Suzy Favor Hamilton	4:13.47	PattiSue Plumer	4:13.68	Alisa Harvey	4:15.44
3000 meters	Lynn Jennings	8:51.97	Annette Peters	8:54.64	Valerie McGovern (Republic of Ireland)	8:57.73
5000 meters	PattiSue Plumer	15:45.67	Sabrina Dornhoefer	15:46.20	Sammie Gdowski	15:51.54
10,000 meters	Colette Murphy	32:20.92	Cathy O'Brien	32:25.93	Sylvia Mosqueda	32:41.06
100 meters hurdles (-0.7 m/s)	LaVonna Martin	12.90	Candy Young	13.16	Lynda Goode	13.18
400 meters hurdles	Janeene Vickers	54.80	Sandra Farmer-Patrick	55.18	Schowonda Williams	55.61
10 kilometres race walk	Debbi Lawrence	46:14.4 AR, CR	Teresa Vaill	46:54.2	Sara Standley	47:08.5

=== Women field events ===
Event	Gold		Silver		Bronze	
High jump	Yolanda Henry	1.96 m (6 ft 5 in)	Phyllis Bluntson	1.93 m (6 ft 3 3/4 in)	Vicki Borsheim	1.93 m (6 ft 3 3/4 in)
Long jump	Jackie Joyner-Kersee	7.08 m (23 ft 2 1/2 in)	Sheila Echols	6.76 m (22 ft 2 in)w	Cindy Greiner	6.70 m (21 ft 11 3/4 in)w
Triple jump	Sheila Hudson	14.07 m (46 ft 1 3/4 in)w	Wendy Brown	13.72 m (45 ft 0 in)w	Diana Orrange	13.51 m (44 ft 3 3/4 in)
Shot put	Connie Price-Smith	18.56 m (60 ft 10 1/2 in)	Ramona Pagel	17.81 m (58 ft 5 in)	Bonnie Dasse	17.73 m (58 ft 2 in)
Discus throw	Connie Price-Smith	58.36 m (191 ft 5 in)	Lacy Barnes-Mileham	57.12 m (187 ft 4 in)	Penny Neer	56.74 m (186 ft 1 in)
Hammer throw	Bonnie Edmondson	53.26 m (174 ft 8 in) CR	Virginia Young	50.42 m (165 ft 5 in)	Maria Teeman	49.98 m (163 ft 11 in)
Javelin throw	Karin Smith	62.86 m (206 ft 2 in)	Laverne Eve (The Bahamas)	59.10 m (193 ft 10 in)	Donna Mayhew	58.82 m (192 ft 11 in)
Heptathlon	Cindy Greiner	6292w	Gea Johnson	6135w	Sharon Hanson	6030

== See also ==
- United States Olympic Trials (track and field)
