= Leroy Burrell =

American track and field athlete

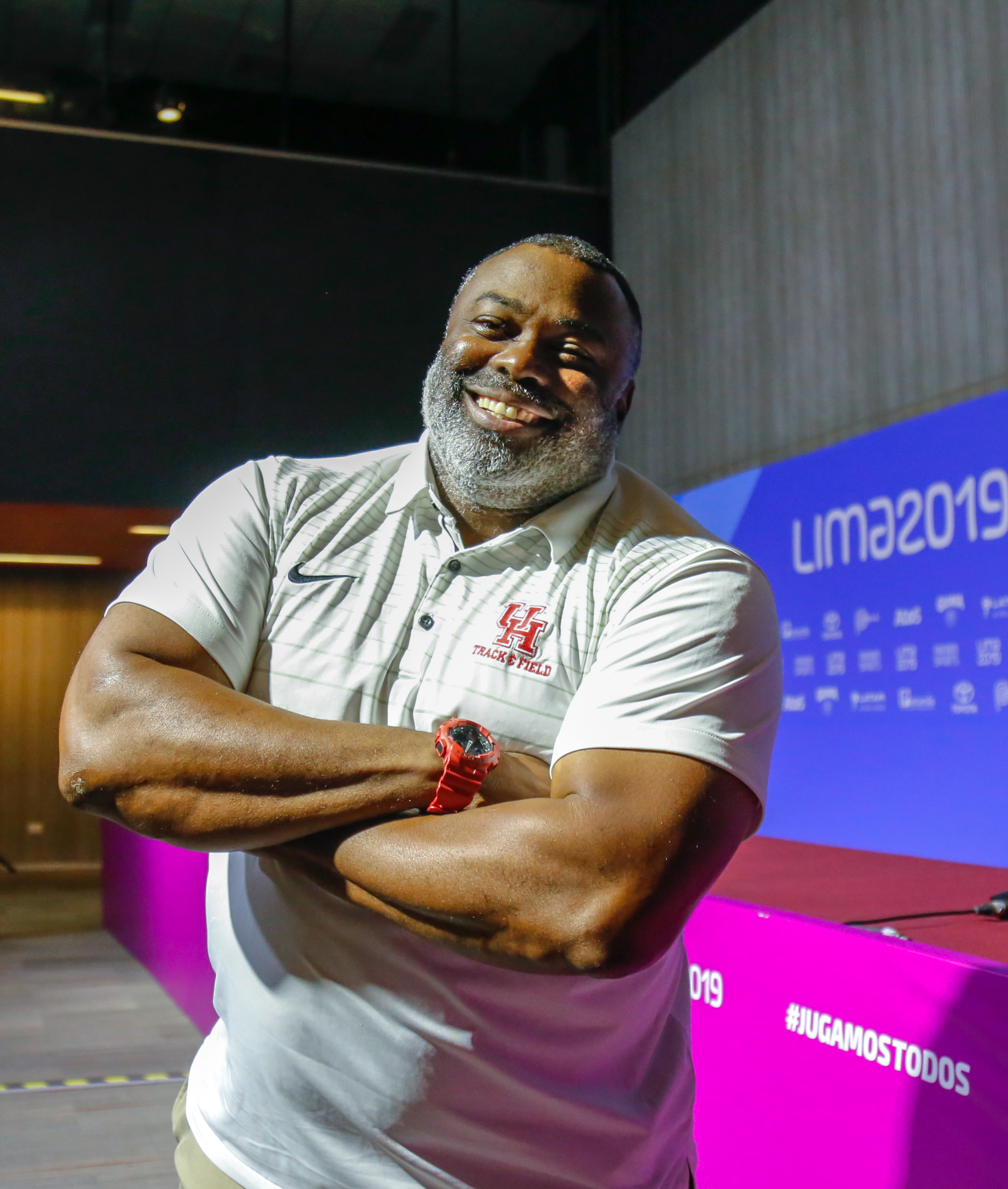
- Burrell in 2019

Personal information
- Full name: Leroy Russel Burrell
- Born: February 21, 1967 (age 59) Philadelphia, Pennsylvania, U.S.
- Height: 6 ft 0 in (183 cm)
- Weight: 180 lb (82 kg)

Sport
- Sport: Track and field
- Events: Sprints and long jump
- College team: Houston Cougars (1985-1990)
- Club: Santa Monica Track Club
- Coached by: Tom Tellez
- Retired: 1998

Achievements and titles
- Personal bests: 60 m: 6.48 s (1991); 100 m: 9.85 s (1994); 200 m: 20.12 s (1992); Long jump: 8.37 m (1989)
Medal record
Men's athletics
Representing the United States
Olympic Games
Gold medal – first place	1992 Barcelona	4 × 100 m relay
World Championships
Gold medal – first place	1991 Tokyo	4 × 100 m relay
Gold medal – first place	1993 Stuttgart	4 × 100 m relay
Silver medal – second place	1991 Tokyo	100 m
Goodwill Games
Gold medal – first place	1990 Seattle	100 m
Silver medal – second place	1994 St. Petersburg	100 m
World Cup
Silver medal – second place	1989 Barcelona	100 m

Leroy Russel Burrell (born February 21, 1967) is an American former track and field athlete, who twice set the world record for the 100 m sprint.

== Early life ==
Burrell grew up in Lansdowne, Pennsylvania, and attended Penn Wood High School, where he single-handedly won the state championship by winning the 100 m, 200 m, long jump, and triple jump. Suffering from poor eyesight accentuated by a childhood eye injury, he was poor at other sports, but excelled on the track from an early age. He attended the University of Houston from 1986 to 1990, where he was a nine-time NCAA All-American and set the NCAA outdoor record in the long jump.

== Professional career ==
Burrell was plagued by injuries and bad luck throughout his career, particularly around major championships. He won gold in the 100 m ahead of Carl Lewis at the 1990 Goodwill Games in Seattle. He won the silver in the 100 m behind Lewis at the 1991 World Championships. At the 1992 Summer Olympics in Barcelona, Burrell false-started in the 100 m final. When the race finally restarted, his reaction off the line was slow, and he finished fifth. He did manage to win a relay gold as part of the U.S. 4 × 100 m team.

On May 19, 1990, Burrell ran a wind-assisted 200 m at College Station, Texas, in a time of 19.61 seconds. The wind speed was +4.0 m per second. This was the fastest time for the 200 m for over six years until the 1996 Olympic final in Atlanta, where Michael Johnson ran 19.32 seconds.

He first set the 100 m world record in June 1991 with a time of 9.90 seconds. This was broken that September by Carl Lewis who ran 9.86 sec at the 1991 World Track and Field Championships where Burrell finished second in a new personal best time of 9.88 sec. In July 1994, Burrell set the world record for the second time when he ran 9.85 sec at Athletissima, in Lausanne, Switzerland (a record that stood until the 1996 Olympics when Donovan Bailey ran 9.84 sec).

Since his retirement in 1998, Burrell has replaced his old college mentor, Tom Tellez, as coach of the University of Houston's track and field team. Burrell has led UH to 14 men's Conference USA titles (nine indoor, five outdoor) and nine women's titles (four indoor, five outdoor). He was inducted into the Texas Track and Field Coaches Hall of Fame in 2014.

In June 2022, Burrell stepped down as head coach at Houston and accepted the head coaching position for Auburn track and field.

In June 2026, Burell accepted the head track and field coach position at Texas A&M University.

== Personal life ==
Burrell married Michelle Finn, also a sprinter, in 1994, and they have three sons together: Cameron who was a sprinter for the Houston Cougars and died in 2021, Joshua, and Jaden. On June 7, 2017, Cameron joined his father in the sub-10 second club. Burrell's younger sister Dawn also competed in track and field at the highest level, as a member of the 2000 US Olympic team and world indoor champion in the long jump.

== Statistics ==
Information from IAAF profile unless otherwise noted.

=== World records ===
Includes former all-conditions world best in the 200 meters. All world records are former as of May 24, 2014.

Event	Time (s)	Competition	Venue	Date	Notes
60 m	6.48	Madrid indoor meet	Madrid, Spain	February 13, 1991	(Note: American Andre Cason broke Leroy Burrell's 6.48 s world record in the 60 m a year later with a time of 6.45 s.)
100 m	9.90	U.S. Championships	New York, New York, U.S.	June 14, 1991	+1.8 m/s wind (Note: American Carl Lewis broke Leroy Burrell's 9.90 s world record in the 100 m two months later at the 1991 World Championships with a time of 9.86 s.)
100 m	9.85	Athletissima Lausanne	Lausanne, Switzerland	July 6, 1994	+1.2 m/s wind (Note: Canadian Donovan Bailey broke Leroy Burrel's 9.85 s world record in the 100 m two years later at the 1996 Summer Olympics with a time of 9.84 s.)
200 m	19.61	SWC Championships	College Station, Texas, U.S.	May 19, 1990	+4.1 m/s wind, w (Note: Though the race was wind-assisted and therefore ineligible for the official IAAF world record, at the time it was the fastest anyone had ever run the 200 m in any conditions.)
4 × 100 m relay	37.79	Herculis Monaco	Monaco	August 3, 1991	(Note: Shared with Americans Michael Marsh, Floyd Heard, and Carl Lewis for the Santa Monica Track Club.)
4 × 100 m relay	37.67	Weltklasse Zürich	Zürich, Switzerland	August 7, 1991	(Note: Shared with Americans Michael Marsh, Dennis Mitchell, and Carl Lewis for the U.S.)
4 × 100 m relay	37.50	World Championships	Tokyo, Japan	September 1, 1991	Former CR (Note: Shared with Americans Andre Cason, Dennis Mitchell, and Carl Lewis for the U.S.)
4 × 100 m relay	37.40	Olympic Games	Barcelona, Spain	August 8, 1992	Former OR (Note: Shared with Americans Michael Marsh, Dennis Mitchell, and Carl Lewis for the U.S.)
4 × 100 m relay	37.40	World Championships	Stuttgart, Germany	August 21, 1993	Former CR (Note: Shared with Americans Jon Drummond, Andre Cason, and Dennis Mitchell for the U.S.)
4 × 200 m relay	1:19.38	Koblenz meet	Koblenz, Germany	August 23, 1989	(Note: Shared with Americans Danny Everett, Floyd Heard, and Carl Lewis for the Santa Monica Track Club.)
4 × 200 m relay	1:19.11	Penn Relays	Philadelphia, Pennsylvania, U.S.	April 23, 1992	(Note: Shared with Americans Michael Marsh, Floyd Heard, and Carl Lewis for the Santa Monica Track Club.)
4 × 200 m relay	1:18.68	Mt. SAC Relays	Walnut, California, U.S.	April 17, 1994	(Note: Shared with Americans Michael Marsh, Floyd Heard, and Carl Lewis for the Santa Monica Track Club.)

=== Personal bests ===
==== Sprints ====
Event	Time (s)	Wind (m/s)	Competition	Venue	Date	Notes
55 m	6.09	n/a	Houston indoor meet	Houston, Texas, U.S.	January 28, 1991	
60 m	6.48	n/a	Madrid indoor meet	Madrid, Spain	February 13, 1991	Former WR
100 m	9.85	+1.2	Athletissima Lausanne	Lausanne, Switzerland	July 6, 1994	Former WR
200 m	20.12	−0.8	U.S. Olympic Trials	New Orleans, Louisiana, U.S.	June 27, 1992	
200 m	19.61	+4.1	SWC Championships	College Station, Texas, U.S.	May 19, 1990	w
4 × 100 m relay	37.40	n/a	Olympic Games	Barcelona, Spain	August 8, 1992	Former WR, OR
4 × 100 m relay	37.40	n/a	World Championships	Stuttgart, Germany	August 21, 1993	Former WR, CR
4 × 200 m relay	1:18.68	n/a	Mt. SAC Relays	Walnut, California, U.S.	April 17, 1994	Former WR

==== Jumps ====
Event	Mark (m)	Wind (m/s)	Competition	Venue	Date	Notes
Long jump	8.37	+0.4	NCAA Division I Championships	Provo, Utah, U.S.	June 2, 1989	
Long jump indoor	8.23	n/a	NCAA Division I Indoor Championships	Indianapolis, Indiana, U.S.	March 9, 1990	

=== International championship results ===
Year	Competition	Venue	Position	Event	Time	Wind (m/s)	Notes
Representing the United States
1989	World Cup	Barcelona, Spain	2nd	100 m	10.15	+0.5	
1990	Goodwill Games	Seattle, Washington, U.S.	1st	100 m	10.05	+1.1	
1991	World Championships	Tokyo, Japan	2nd	100 m	9.88	+1.2	PB
1991	World Championships	Tokyo, Japan	6th (qf 4)	200 m	21.21	−0.7	
1991	World Championships	Tokyo, Japan	1st	4 × 100 m relay	37.50	n/a	WR, CR
1992	Olympic Games	Barcelona, Spain	5th	100 m	10.10	+0.5	
1992	Olympic Games	Barcelona, Spain	1st	4 × 100 m relay	37.40	n/a	WR, OR
1993	World Championships	Stuttgart, Germany	1st	4 × 100 m relay	37.40	n/a	WR, CR
1994	Goodwill Games	St. Petersburg, Russia	2nd	100 m	10.11	−1.9	

=== National championship results ===
Year	Competition	Venue	Position	Event	Time	Wind (m/s)	Notes
Representing the Houston Cougars and Santa Monica Track Club
1988	NCAA Division I Championships	Eugene, Oregon, U.S.	7th	Long jump	n/a	+4.1	8.06 m, w
1988	NCAA Division I Championships	Eugene, Oregon, U.S.	5th	100 m	10.31	+0.4	
1988	U.S. Olympic Trials	Indianapolis, Indiana, U.S.	6th (semi 2)	100 m	10.10	+4.9	w
1989	U.S. Indoor Championships	New York, New York, U.S.	1st	55 m	6.15	n/a	
1989	NCAA Division I Indoor Championships	Indianapolis, Indiana, U.S.	1st	Long jump	n/a	n/a	8.09 m
1989	NCAA Division I Indoor Championships	Indianapolis, Indiana, U.S.	2nd	55 m	6.11	n/a	
1989	NCAA Division I Championships	Provo, Utah, U.S.	2nd	Long jump	n/a	+0.4	8.37 m, PB
1989	NCAA Division I Championships	Provo, Utah, U.S.	5th	100 m	10.19	+2.4	w
1989	U.S. Championships	Houston, Texas, U.S.	1st	100 m	9.94	+0.8	WL, PB
1990	NCAA Division I Indoor Championships	Indianapolis, Indiana, U.S.	1st	Long jump	n/a	n/a	8.23 m
1990	NCAA Division I Championships	Durham, North Carolina, U.S.	1st	100 m	9.94	+2.4	w
1990	U.S. Championships	Norwalk, California, U.S.	4th	Long jump	n/a	+4.1	8.06 m, w
1991	U.S. Championships	New York, New York, U.S.	1st	100 m	9.90	+1.9	WR
1991	U.S. Championships	New York, New York, U.S.	2nd	200 m	20.42	−2.0	
1992	U.S. Indoor Championships	New York, New York, U.S.	1st	60 m	6.55	n/a	
1992	U.S. Olympic Trials	New Orleans, Louisiana, U.S.	3rd	100 m	10.10	−0.7	
1992	U.S. Olympic Trials	New Orleans, Louisiana, U.S.	5th	200 m	20.16	+1.0	
1993	U.S. Championships	Eugene, Oregon, U.S.	5th	100 m	10.15	+4.8	w
1993	U.S. Championships	Eugene, Oregon, U.S.	4th	200 m	20.35	+2.5	w
1995	U.S. Championships	Sacramento, California, U.S.	5th	100 m	10.31	−1.2	
1996	U.S. Indoor Championships	Atlanta, Georgia, U.S.	4th	60 m	6.60	n/a	
1996	U.S. Olympic Trials	Atlanta, Georgia, U.S.	6th	100 m	10.07	+1.1	
1997	U.S. Championships	Indianapolis, Indiana, U.S.	6th	100 m	10.09	+0.2	

=== Circuit wins ===
==== Overall ====
- IAAF Grand Prix: 1990

==== 100 meters ====
- IAAF Grand Prix: 1990
  - Athens: 1990
