= 1992 United States Olympic trials (track and field) =

- Dates: June 19–28
- Host city: New Orleans, Louisiana, United States
- Venue: Tad Gormley Stadium
- Level: Senior
- Type: Outdoor

The 1992 United States Olympic trials for track and field were held at Tad Gormley Stadium in New Orleans, Louisiana. Organised by The Athletics Congress (TAC), the ten-day competition lasted from June 19 until June 28 and also served as the national championships in track and field for the United States. This was the first time the Olympic trials served in the dual capacity since 1932. The Marathon trials were held April 11, in Columbus, Ohio.

The results of the event determined qualification for the United States at the 1992 Summer Olympics held in Barcelona, Spain.

These trials also saw the premature conclusion of the Dan & Dave Reebok advertising campaign as Dan O'Brien failed to make the Olympic team in the Decathlon after missing his attempts in the Pole vault.

== 1992 U.S. Olympic track and field trials results ==
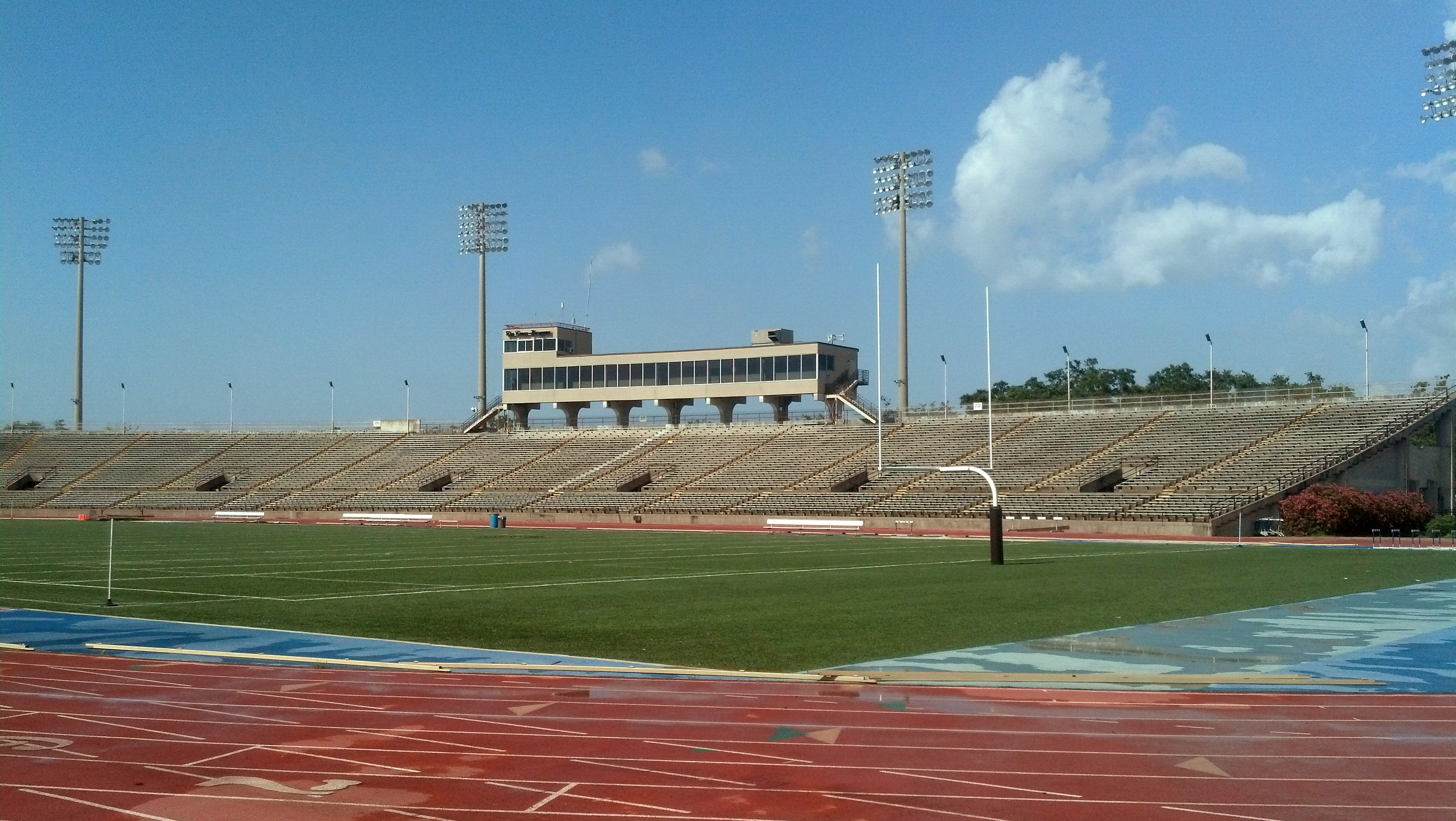
1992 U.S. Olympic track and field trials results

Key: ≠ Athlete without "A" standard, not selected.

=== Men ===
==== Men track events ====
Event	Gold		Silver		Bronze	
100 metres Wind : -0.7 m/s	Dennis Mitchell	10.09	Mark Witherspoon	10.09	Leroy Burrell	10.10
200 metres Wind : +1.0 m/s	Michael Johnson	19.79 MR	Michael Marsh	19.86	Michael Bates	20.14
400 metres	Danny Everett	43.81 CR	Steven Lewis	44.08	Quincy Watts	44.22
800 metres	Johnny Gray	1.42.80 CR	Mark Everett	1.43.67	Jose Parrilla	1.43.97
1500 metres	Jim Spivey	3.36.24	Steve Holman	3.36.48	Terrance Herrington	3.37.14
5000 metres	John Trautmann	13.40.30	Bob Kennedy	13.41.22	John Gregorek	13.42.20
10,000 metres^{[a]}	Todd Williams	28.19.82	Ken Martin	28.31.06	Aaron Ramirez	28.32.54
Marathon	Steve Spence	2:12:43	Ed Eyestone	2:12:51	Bob Kempainen	2:12:54
110 metres hurdles Wind : +0.0 m/s	Jack Pierce	13.13 CR	Anthony Dees	13.23	Arthur Blake	13.30
400 metres hurdles	Kevin Young	47.89	David Patrick	48.01	McClinton Neal	48.52
3000 metres steeplechase	Brian Diemer	8.16.58 CR	Mark Croghan	8.16.87	Daniel Lopez	8.16.88
20 km walk	Allen James	1:29:38.00	Gary Morgan	1:30:23.00	Jonathan Matthews	1:30:39.00

==== Men field events ====
Event	Gold		Silver		Bronze	
High jump	Hollis Conway	2.35 m (7 ft 8 1/2 in)	Darrin Plab	2.35 m (7 ft 8 1/2 in)	Charles Austin	2.32 m (7 ft 7 1/4 in)
Pole vault	Tim Bright	5.80 m (19 ft 1/4 in)	Dave Volz	5.80 m (19 ft 1/4 in)	Kory Tarpenning	5.80 m (19 ft 1/4 in)
Long jump	Mike Powell	8.62 m (28 ft 3 1/4 in)	Carl Lewis	8.53 m (27 ft 11 3/4 in)	Joe Greene	8.26 m (27 ft 1 in)
Triple jump	Charlie Simpkins	17.86 m (58 ft 7 in)w	Mike Conley	17.68 m (58 ft 0 in)	John Tillman	17.25 m (56 ft 7 in)w
Shot put	Mike Stulce	21.47 m (70 ft 5 1/4 in)	Jim Doehring	21.08 m (69 ft 1 3/4 in)	Ronald Backes	20.77 m (68 ft 1 1/2 in)
Discus throw	Kamy Keshmiri	64.56 m (211 ft 9 in)	Anthony Washington	63.29 m (207 ft 7 in)	Mike Buncic	63.24 m (207 ft 5 in)
Hammer throw	Jud Logan	80.12 m (262 ft 10 in) CR	Lance Deal	79.93 m (262 ft 2 in)	Kenneth Flax	77.54 m (254 ft 4 in)
Javelin throw	Tom Pukstys	79.98 m (262 ft 4 in)	Michael Barnett	78.20 m (256 ft 6 in)	Brian Crouser	77.60 m (254 ft 7 in)
Decathlon	David Johnson	8649	Aric Long	8237	Robert Muzzio	8163
Decathlon	100m / Long jump / Shot put / High jump / 400m / 110m H / Discus / Pole vault / Javelin / 1500m; 11.18 / 7.27 / 15.05 / 2.00 / 48.21 / 14.44 / 48.70 / 5.20 / 74.58 / 4:27.17		100m / Long jump / Shot put / High jump / 400m / 110m H / Discus / Pole vault / Javelin / 1500m; 11.32 / 7.33 / 15.45 / 2.12 / 49.95 / 14.83 / 48.18 / 5.10 / 58.78 / 4:46.42		100m / Long jump / Shot put / High jump / 400m / 110m H / Discus / Pole vault / Javelin / 1500m; 11.26 / 7.14 / 16.16 / 2.00 / 49.45 / 14.89 / 50.40 / 4.90 / 56.44 / 4:36.54	

=== Women ===
==== Women track events ====
Event	Gold		Silver		Bronze	
100 metres Wind : -0.5 m/s	Gwen Torrence	10.97	Gail Devers	11.02	Evelyn Ashford	11.17
200 metres Wind : +0.8 m/s	Gwen Torrence	22.03	Carlette Guidry	22.24	Michelle Finn	22.51
400 metres	Rochelle Stevens	50.22	Jearl Miles	50.30	Natasha Kaiser	50.42
800 metres	Joetta Clark	1:58.47	Julie Jenkins	1:59.15	Meredith Rainey	1:59.18
1500 metres	Regina Jacobs	4:03.72	PattiSue Plumer	4:04.04	Suzy Hamilton	4:04.53
3000 metres	PattiSue Plumer	8:40.98	Shelly Steely	8:41.28	Annette Peters	8:42.31
10,000 metres	Lynn Jennings	32:55.96	Judi St.Hilaire	33:03.39	Gwynneth Coogan	33:04.64
Marathon	Janis Klecker	2:30:12 $20,000	Cathy O'Brien	2:30:26 $20,000	Francie Larrieu Smith	2:30:39
100 metres hurdles Wind :+-0.4 m/s	Gail Devers	12.55	LaVonna Martin	12.71	Lynda Tolbert	12.74
400 metres hurdles	Sandra Farmer-Patrick	53.62	Tonja Buford	54.75	Janeene Vickers	54.80
10 km walk	Debbi Lawrence	45:46	Victoria Herazo	46:21	Michelle Rohl	46:50

==== Women field events ====
Event	Gold		Silver		Bronze	
High jump	Tanya Hughes	1.92 m (6 ft 3 1/2 in)	Amber Welty	1.89 m (6 ft 2 1/4 in)	Sue Rembao	1.89 m (6 ft 2 1/4 in)
Long jump	Jackie Joyner-Kersee	7.08 m (23 ft 2 1/2 in)	Sheila Echols	6.91 m (22 ft 8 in)	Sharon Jewell	6.67 m (21 ft 10 1/2 in)
Shot put	Connie Price-Smith	19.06 m (62 ft 6 1/4 in)	Ramona Pagel	18.15 m (59 ft 6 1/2 in)	Bonnie Dasse	17.81 m (58 ft 5 in)
Discus throw	Connie Price-Smith	61.72 m (202 ft 5 in)	Carla Garrett	60.54 m (198 ft 7 in)	Penny Neer	58.98 m (193 ft 6 in)
Javelin throw	Donna Mayhew	57.64 m (189 ft 1 in)	Marilyn Senz	56.88 m (186 ft 7 in)	Meg Foster	55.96 m (183 ft 7 in)
Heptathlon	Jackie Joyner-Kersee	6695	Cindy Greiner	6223	Kym Carter	6200
Heptathlon	100m H / High jump / Shot put / 200m / Long jump / Javelin / 800m; 12.93 / 1.85 / 15.31 / 23.67 / 6.98 / 46.72 / 2:32.53		100m H / High jump / Shot put / 200m / Long jump / Javelin / 800m; 13.61 / 1.88 / 14.36 / 25.15 / 6.42 / 38.66 / 2:22.08		100m H / High jump / Shot put / 200m / Long jump / Javelin / 800m; 14.17 / 1.79 / 14.60 / 24.99 / 6.06 / 40.68 / 2:06.96	
