= 1995 USA Outdoor Track and Field Championships =

- Dates: June 15–18
- Host city: Sacramento, California
- Venue: Hughes Stadium
- Level: Senior
- Type: Outdoor
- Events: 40 (men: 20; women: 20)

The 1995 USA Outdoor Track and Field Championships was organised by USA Track & Field and held from June 20 to 24 at Hughes Stadium, on the campus of Sacramento City College in Sacramento, California. The four-day competition served as the national championships in track and field for the United States and also the trials for the 1995 World Championships in Athletics in Gothenburg, Sweden.

Athletes that finished in the top three of their event and held the IAAF qualifying standard were eligible to represent the United States at the 1995 World Championships. The United States was able to send three athletes per event to the competition, provided they all met the A qualification standard. The World Championships national selection for the marathon and 50 kilometres walk were incorporated into the discrete national championship meets for those events. Selection for the relay races were made by committee.

Eight Americans went on to win an individual gold medal at the 1995 World Championships; Michael Johnson won three including being a part of the 4 × 400 relay, Derrick Adkins, Allen Johnson, John Godina, Dan O'Brien, Gwen Torrence, Gail Devers and Kim Batten. In addition USA won the Women's 4 × 100 metres relay, Women's 4 × 400 metres relay and Men's 4 × 400 metres relay.

== Results ==
Key: ≠ Not selected for World Championships in Athletics due to failure to reach IAAF qualifying standard within the specified time limit.

=== Men track events ===
Event	Gold		Silver		Bronze	
100 meters Wind -1.2	Michael Marsh	10.23	Maurice Greene	10.23	Dennis Mitchell	10.23
200 meters Wind +3.5	Michael Johnson	19.83w	Kevin Little	20.16w	Jeff Williams	20.20w
400 meters	Michael Johnson	43.66 CR	Butch Reynolds	44.42	Derek Mills	44.58
800 meters	Brandon Rock	1.46.50	Mark Everett	1.47.63	Jose Parrilla	1.48.14
1500 meters	Paul McMullen	3.43.90	Bryan Hyde	3.43.90	Terrance Herrington	3.44.03
5000 meters	Bob Kennedy	13.19.99	Mark Coogan	13.23.72	Matt Giusto	13.27.87
10,000 meters	Todd Williams	28.01.84	Christian Fox	28.23.94	Tom Ansberry	28.27.85
110 m hurdles Wind +4.2	Roger Kingdom	13.09w	Allen Johnson	13.11w	Jack Pierce	13.26w
400 m hurdles	Derrick Adkins	48.44	Ryan Hayden	49.04	Octavius Terry	49.20
3000 m s'chase	Mark Croghan	8.17.54	Thomas Nohilly	8.26.54	Karl Van Calcar	8.27.38
Marathon	Keith Brantly	2.14.27	Ed Eyestone	2.14.36	Dan Held	2.15.06
20 km walk	Allen James	1:24:46	Herm Nelson	1:27:15	Gary Morgan	1:28:41

=== Men field events ===
Event	Gold		Silver		Bronze	
High jump	Charles Austin	2.30 m (7 ft 6 1/2 in)	Anthony Barton	2.27 m (7 ft 5 1/4 in)	Rick Noji	2.27 m (7 ft 5 1/4 in)
Pole vault	Scott Huffman	5.80 m (19 ft 1/4 in)	Dean Starkey	5.74 m (18 ft 9 3/4 in)	Bill Payne	5.74 m (18 ft 9 3/4 in)
Long jump	Mike Powell	8.55 m (28 ft 1/2 in)w	Carl Lewis	8.45 m (27 ft 8 1/2 in)w	Kareem Streete-Thompson	8.36 m (27 ft 5 in)w
Triple jump	Mike Conley	17.18 m (56 ft 4 1/4 in)	Ivory Angello	17.10 m (56 ft 1 in)w	LaMark Carter	16.64 m (54 ft 7 in)w
Shot put	Brent Noon	21.08 m (69 ft 1 3/4 in)	John Godina	20.90 m (68 ft 6 3/4 in)	Randy Barnes	20.85 m (68 ft 4 3/4 in)
Discus throw	Mike Buncic	64.82 m (212 ft 7 in)	John Godina	64.59 m (211 ft 10 in)	Randy Heisler	63.60 m (208 ft 7 in)
Hammer throw	Lance Deal	77.67 m (254 ft 9 in)	David Popejoy	73.40 m (240 ft 9 in)	Kevin McMahon	71.30 m (233 ft 11 in)
Javelin throw	Tom Pukstys	81.48 m (267 ft 3 in)	Erik Smith	74.04 m (242 ft 10 in)	Jim Connolly	73.86 m (242 ft 3 in)
Decathlon	Dan O'Brien	8682	Chris Huffins	8351	Brian Brophy	8257

=== Women track events ===
Event	Gold		Silver		Bronze	
100 meters Wind +0.0	Gwen Torrence	11.04	Carlette Guidry	11.12	Celena Mondie-Milner	11.22
200 meters Wind +2.3	Gwen Torrence	22.03w	Carlette Guidry	22.57w	Celena Mondie-Milner	22.76w
400 meters	Jearl Miles Clark	50.90	Kim Graham	51.48	Maicel Malone	51.56
800 meters	Meredith Valmon	2:00.07	Joetta Clark Diggs	2:01.02	Amy Wickus	2:01.26
1500 meters	Regina Jacobs	4:05.18	Suzy Favor Hamilton	4:07.07	Sarah Thorsett	4:07.49
5000 meters	Gina Procaccio	15:26.34	Laura Mykytok	15:27.52	Libbie Hickman	15:28.27
10,000 meters	Lynn Jennings	31:57.19 CR	Laurie Henes	32:05.32	Anne Marie Lauck	32:07.43
100 m hurdles Wind +1.6	Gail Devers	12.77	Marsha Guialdo	12.88	Doris Williams	13.03
400 m hurdles	Kim Batten	54.74	Tonja Buford-Bailey	54.82	Trevaia Davis	55.43
3000 m s'chase	Chris Morgan	10:51.92	Melissa Teemant	10:56.90	Teresa DiPerna	11:07.02
10 km walk	Teresa Vaill	45:01.0 CR	Michelle Rohl	45:16.2	Debbi Lawrence	45:46.0

=== Women field events ===
Event	Gold		Silver		Bronze	
High jump	Tisha Waller	1.95 m (6 ft 4 3/4 in)	Connie Teaberry	1.95 m (6 ft 4 3/4 in)	Amy Acuff	1.92 m (6 ft 3 1/2 in)
Pole vault	Melissa Price	3.89 m (12 ft 9 in)	Stacy Dragila	3.50 m (11 ft 5 3/4 in)	Phil Raschker	3.30 m (10 ft 9 3/4 in)
Long jump	Jackie Joyner Kersee	6.88 m (22 ft 6 3/4 in)w	Marieke Veltman	6.74 m (22 ft 1 1/4 in)w	Sharon Jewell	6.68 m (21 ft 10 3/4 in)w
Triple jump	Sheila Hudson	14.66 m (48 ft 1 in)w	Cynthea Rhodes	14.12 m (46 ft 3 3/4 in)w	Diana Orrange	13.89 m (45 ft 6 3/4 in)w
Shot put	Connie Price-Smith	19.05 m (62 ft 6 in)	Ramona Pagel	18.65 m (61 ft 2 1/4 in)	Eileen Vanisi	17.58 m (57 ft 8 in)
Discus throw	Edie Boyer	62.58 m (205 ft 3 in)	Pam Dukes	59.44 m (195 ft 0 in)	Danyel Mitchell	59.36 m (194 ft 9 in)
Hammer throw	Dawn Ellerbe	55.38 m (181 ft 8 in)	Sonja Fitts	55.04 m (180 ft 6 in)	Alexandra Earl-Givan	54.52 m (178 ft 10 in)
Javelin throw	Donna Mayhew	59.16 m (194 ft 1 in)	Ashley Selman	58.32 m (191 ft 4 in)	Erica Wheeler	56.02 m (183 ft 9 in)
Heptathlon	Jackie Joyner-Kersee	6375w	Kym Carter	6354	Kelly Blair LaBounty	6354
