= 1994 USA Outdoor Track and Field Championships =

- Dates: June 15–18, 22
- Host city: Knoxville, Tennessee
- Venue: Tom Black Track at LaPorte Stadium
- Level: Senior
- Type: Outdoor
- Events: 40 (men: 20; women: 21)

The 1994 USA Outdoor Track and Field Championships was organised by USA Track & Field and held from June 15 to 22 at Tom Black Track at LaPorte Stadium, on the campus of the University of Tennessee in Knoxville, Tennessee. The primarily four-day competition served as the national championships in track and field for the United States. The women's 3000 meters was held four days after the primary meet on June 22.

== Results ==
=== Men track events ===
Event	Gold		Silver		Bronze	
100 meters (-1.6 m/s)	Dennis Mitchell	10.13	Jon Drummond	10.14	Vincent Henderson	10.27
200 meters (-1.2 m/s)	Ron Clark	20.77	Bryan Bridgewater	20.85	Dino Napier	20.89
400 meters	Antonio Pettigrew	44.43	Jason Rouser	45.19	Calvin Davis	45.20
800 meters	Mark Everett	1:46.08	Stanley Redwine	1:47.45	Jose Parrilla	1:47.78
1500 meters	Terrance Herrington	3:37.77	Jason Pyrah	3:38.20	Erik Nedeau	3:38.31
5000 meters	Matt Giusto	14:04.30	Reuben Reina	14:04.35	Ronnie Harris	14:04.72
10,000 meters	Tom Ansberry	29:01.84	Steve Plasencia	29:03.54	Jim Westphal	29:14.49
110 meters hurdles (-0.8 m/s)	Mark Crear	13.36	Robert Reading	13.37	Allen Johnson	13.41
400 meters hurdles	Derrick Adkins	48.41	Octavius Terry	49.03	Torrance Zellner	49.07
3000 meters steeplechase	Mark Croghan	8:23.47	Marc Davis	8:30.86	Danny Lopez	8:31.86
20 kilometres race walk	Allen James	1:28:36	Jonathan Matthews	1:29:03	Andrzej Chylinski	1:30:05

=== Men field events ===
Event	Gold		Silver		Bronze	
High jump	Hollis Conway	2.28 m (7 ft 5 3/4 in)	Tony Barton	2.25 m (7 ft 4 1/2 in)	Stephen Smith	2.25 m (7 ft 4 1/2 in)
Pole vault	Scott Huffman	5.97 m (19 ft 7 in) AR, CR	Dean Starkey	5.70 m (18 ft 8 1/4 in)	Brent Burns	5.70 m (18 ft 8 1/4 in)
Long jump	Mike Powell	8.58 m (28 ft 1 3/4 in)w	Kareem Streete-Thompson	8.64 m (28 ft 4 in)w	Dion Bentley	8.06 m (26 ft 5 1/4 in)w
Triple jump	Mike Conley	17.51 m (57 ft 5 1/4 in)	Kenny Harrison	17.14 m (56 ft 2 3/4 in)	Reggie Jones	16.96 m (55 ft 7 1/2 in)
Shot put	C. J. Hunter	20.82 m (68 ft 3 1/2 in)	Randy Barnes	68-1.5 m (218 ft 2 in)	Brent Noon	67-3.25 m (209 ft 1 3/4 in)
Discus throw	Mike Gravelle	61.38 m (201 ft 4 in)	Randy Heisler	60.24 m (197 ft 7 in)	Carlos Scott	59.32 m (194 ft 7 in)
Hammer throw	Lance Deal	82.50 m (270 ft 8 in) AR, CR	Jim Driscoll	73.30 m (240 ft 5 in)	Kevin McMahon	71.72 m (235 ft 3 in)
Javelin throw	Todd Riech	77.86 m (255 ft 5 in)	Tom Pukstys	77.34 m (253 ft 8 in)	Ed Kaminski	77.02 m (252 ft 8 in)
Decathlon	Dan O'Brien	8707	Steve Fritz	8548	Kip Janvrin	8287

=== Women track events ===
Event	Gold		Silver		Bronze	
100 meters (-0.9 m/s)	Gail Devers	11.15	Carlette Guidry	11.26	Cheryl Taplin	11.27
200 meters (-1.8 m/s)	Carlette Guidry	22.71	Dannette Young-Stone	22.81	Chryste Gaines	23.33
400 meters	Natasha Kaiser-Brown	50.77	Maicel Malone	50.78	Jearl Miles Clark	51.43
800 meters	Joetta Clark Diggs	2:00.41	Amy Wickus	2:00.60	Meredith Valmon	2:00.65
1500 meters	Regina Jacobs	4:07.71	Suzy Favor Hamilton	4:08.15	Kathy Fleming	4:08.79
3000 meters	Annette Peters	9:01.7	Libbie Hickman	9:07.3	Joan Nesbit	9:14.7
5000 meters	Ceci St. Geme	15:57.7	Jen Rhines	16:04.0	Misti Demko	16:10.9
10,000 meters	Olga Appell	32:23.8	Gwyn Coogan	32:24.8	Anne Marie Lauck	32:41.9
100 meters hurdles (-1.2 m/s)	Jackie Joyner-Kersee	12.88	LaVonna Martin-Floreal	13.06	Cheryl Dickey	13.25
400 meters hurdles	Kim Batten	54.51	Tonja Buford-Bailey	55.87	Trevaia Davis	56.55
2000 meters steeplechase no water jump	Gina Willbanks	6:58.5	Marisa Sutera	7:00.5	Teresa DiPerna	7:07.4
10 kilometres race walk track	Teresa Vaill	45:01.5 AR, CR	Michelle Rohl	45:07.6	Deb Van Orden	47:00.3

=== Women field events ===
Event	Gold		Silver		Bronze	
High jump	Angela Spangler	1.92 m (6 ft 3 1/2 in)	Tisha Waller	1.89 m (6 ft 2 1/4 in)	Karol Rovelto	1.86 m (6 ft 1 in)
Pole vault	Melissa Price	3.25 m (10 ft 7 3/4 in) CR	Phil Raschker	3.25 m (10 ft 7 3/4 in) =CR	Jocelyn Chase	3.15 m (10 ft 4 in)
Long jump	Jackie Joyner-Kersee	7.14 m (23 ft 5 in)w	Sheila Echols	6.59 m (21 ft 7 1/4 in)	Terri Turner-Hairston	6.57 m (21 ft 6 1/2 in)w
Triple jump	Sheila Hudson	14.23 m (46 ft 8 in) =AR, =CR	Diana Orrange	14.03 m (46 ft 1/4 in)	Carla Shannon	13.68 m (44 ft 10 1/2 in)
Shot put	Connie Price-Smith	19.60 m (64 ft 3 1/2 in)	Ramona Pagel	17.91 m (58 ft 9 in)	Dawn Dumble	17.47 m (57 ft 3 3/4 in)
Discus throw	Connie Price-Smith	59.46 m (195 ft 0 in)	Lacy Barnes-Mileham	59.00 m (193 ft 6 in)	Kris Kuehl	57.36 m (188 ft 2 in)
Hammer throw	Sonja Fitts	58.06 m (190 ft 5 in) MR	Alexandra Earl-Givan	57.42 m (188 ft 4 in)	Bonnie Edmondson	55.76 m (182 ft 11 in)
Javelin throw	Donna Mayhew	58.94 m (193 ft 4 in)	Nicole Carroll	56.48 m (185 ft 3 in)	Lynda Blutreich	55.56 m (182 ft 3 in)
Heptathlon	Kym Carter	6371	Jamie McNeair	6323	DeDee Nathan	6189
