= 1996 United States Olympic trials (track and field) =

- Dates: June 14–June 23
- Host city: Atlanta, Georgia, United States
- Venue: Centennial Olympic Stadium
- Level: Senior
- Type: Outdoor
- Events: 40 (men: 20; women: 20)

The 1996 United States Olympic trials for track and field were held at Centennial Olympic Stadium in Atlanta, Georgia. This is the same venue as would be used for the 1996 Summer Olympics. This was effectively the new stadium's test run. The stadium was converted into what is now used for baseball as Turner Field. Organised by USA Track and Field, the ten-day competition lasted from June 14 until June 23 and served as the national championships in track and field for the United States. The men's Marathon trials were held February 17 in Charlotte, North Carolina.

The results of the event determined qualification for the American Olympic team at the 1996 Summer Olympics, held in the same stadium. Provided they had achieved the Olympic "A" standard, the top three athletes gained a place on the Olympic team. In the event that a leading athlete did not hold an "A" standard, or an athlete withdrew, the next highest finishing athlete with an "A" standard was selected instead.

== Medal summary ==
Key: ≠ Athlete without "A" standard, not selected.

=== Men ===
==== Men track events ====
Event	Gold		Silver		Bronze	
100 metres Wind : +1.1 m/s	Dennis Mitchell	9.92	Michael Marsh	10.00	Jon Drummond	10.02
200 metres Wind : +1.7 m/s	Michael Johnson	19.66 WR	Jeff Williams	20.03	Michael Marsh	20.04
400 metres	Michael Johnson	43.44 CR	Butch Reynolds	43.91	Alvin Harrison	44.09
800 metres	Johnny Gray	1.44.00	Brandon Rock	1.44.64	Jose Parrilla	1.44.86
1500 metres	Paul McMullen	3.43.86	Jim Sorensen	3.43.88	Jason Pyrah	3.44.03
5000 metres	Bob Kennedy	13.46.17	Matt Giusto	13.56.89	Ronnie Harris	13.57.49
10,000 metres^{[a]}	Todd Williams	28.46.58	Joe LeMay	29.06.89	Dan Middleman	29.13.81
Marathon	Bob Kempainen	2:12:45	Mark Coogan	2:13:05	Keith Brantly	2:13:22
110 metres hurdles Wind : +0.9 m/s	Allen Johnson	12.92 =AR	Mark Crear	13.05	Eugene Swift	13.21
400 metres hurdles	Bryan Bronson	47.98	Derrick Adkins	48.18	Calvin Davis	48.32
3000 metres steeplechase	Mark Croghan	8.18.80	Robert Gary	8.19.26	Marc Davis	8.20.73
20 km race walk	Curt Clausen	1:29:50.00	Tim Seaman	1:30:27.00	Gary Morgan	1:31:00.00

==== Men field events ====
Event	Gold		Silver		Bronze	
High jump	Charles Austin	2.30 m (7 ft 6 1/2 in)	Ed Broxterman	2.30 m (7 ft 6 1/2 in)	Cameron Wright	2.30 m (7 ft 6 1/2 in)
Pole vault	Lawrence Johnson	5.80 m (19 ft 1/4 in)	Jeff Hartwig	5.80 m (19 ft 1/4 in)	Scott Huffman	5.69 m (18 ft 8 in)
Long jump	Mike Powell	8.39 m (27 ft 6 1/4 in)	Joe Greene	8.34 m (27 ft 4 1/4 in)w	Carl Lewis	8.30 m (27 ft 2 3/4 in)
Triple jump	Kenny Harrison	18.01 m (59 ft 1 in)w	Mike Conley	17.57 m (57 ft 7 1/2 in)	Robert Howard	17.19 m (56 ft 4 3/4 in)
Shot put	Randy Barnes	21.37 m (70 ft 1 1/4 in)	John Godina	21.19 m (69 ft 6 1/4 in)	C.J. Hunter	21.07 m (69 ft 1 1/2 in)
Discus throw	Anthony Washington	65.86 m (216 ft 0 in)	John Godina	64.56 m (211 ft 9 in)	Adam Setliff	63.27 m (207 ft 6 in)
Hammer throw	Lance Deal	75.99 m (249 ft 3 in)	David Popejoy	74.27 m (243 ft 8 in)	Kevin McMahon	73.58 m (241 ft 4 in)
Javelin throw	Todd Riech	81.86 m (268 ft 6 in)	Tom Pukstys	81.58 m (267 ft 7 in)	Breaux Greer	79.98 m (262 ft 4 in)
Decathlon	Dan O'Brien	8726 (10.32/7.46/15.64/2.08/46.81/14.04/49.38/5.20/65.22/5:12.01)	Steve Fritz	8636 (10.74/7.62/16.25/2.05/49.36/13.80/50.24/4.90/63.74/4:46.20)	Chris Huffins	8546 (10.22/7.91/16.44/2.02/48.05/14.09/48.62/4.80/63.64/5:27.42)

=== Women ===
==== Women track events ====
Event	Gold		Silver		Bronze	
100 metres Wind : +1.1 m/s	Gwen Torrence	10.82	Gail Devers	10.91	D'Andre Hill	10.92
200 metres Wind : -0.6 m/s	Carlette Guidry	22.14	Dannette Young-Stone	22.18	Inger Miller	22.25
400 metres	Maicel Malone	50.52	Jearl Miles Clark	50.61	Kim Graham	50.87
800 metres	Meredith Valmon	1:57.04 CR	Joetta Clark-Diggs	1:58.22	Suzy Favor Hamilton	1:59.04
1500 metres	Regina Jacobs	4:08.67	Juli Henner	4:09.49	Vicki Huber	4:11.23
5000 metres	Lynn Jennings	15:28.18	Mary Slaney	15:29.39	Amy Rudolph	15:29.91
10,000 metres^{[b]}	Kate Fonshell	32:37.91	Olga Appell	32:43.79	Joan Nesbit	32:46.77
Marathon	Jenny Spangler	2:29:54	Linda Somers	2:30:06	Anne Marie Lauck	2:31:18
100 metres hurdles Wind :+-0.6 m/s	Gail Devers	12.62	Lynda Goode	12.69	Cheryl Dickey	12.76
400 metres hurdles	Kim Batten	53.81	Tonja Buford-Bailey	53.92	Sandra Farmer-Patrick	54.07
3000 metres steeplechase Unofficial event^{[c]}	Courtney Meldrum	10:23.47 WR	Sarah Heeb	10:25.44	Rae Henderson	10:35.93
10 km race walk	Debbi Lawrence	46:05	Michelle Rohl	46:37	Victoria Herazo	48:12

==== Women field events ====
Event	Gold		Silver		Bronze	
High jump	Tisha Waller	1.95 m (6 ft 4 3/4 in)	Connie Teaberry	1.95 m (6 ft 4 3/4 in)	Amy Acuff	1.92 m (6 ft 3 1/2 in)
Pole vault	Stacy Dragila	4.20 m (13 ft 9 1/4 in) NR	Melissa Price	3.90 m (12 ft 9 1/2 in)	Tiffany Smith	3.80 m (12 ft 5 1/2 in)
Long jump^{[d]}	Jackie Joyner-Kersee	7.04 m (23 ft 1 in)w	Shana Williams	6.93 m (22 ft 8 3/4 in)	Marieke Veltman	6.88 m (22 ft 6 3/4 in)
Triple jump^{[e]}	Cynthea Rhodes	14.06 m (46 ft 1 1/2 in)	Sheila Hudson	14.05 m (46 ft 1 in)	Diana Orrange	13.84 m (45 ft 4 3/4 in)
Shot put	Connie Price-Smith	19.09 m (62 ft 7 1/2 in)	Ramona Pagel	18.60 m (61 ft 1/4 in)	Dawn Dumble	17.73 m (58 ft 2 in)
Discus throw	Suzy Powell	60.58 m (198 ft 9 in)	Lacy Barnes-Mileham	59.66 m (195 ft 8 in)	Aretha Hill	58.04 m (190 ft 5 in)
Hammer throw^{[f]}	Dawn Ellerbe	59.06 m (193 ft 9 in) CR	Leslie Coons	57.46 m (188 ft 6 in)	Katie Panek	56.34 m (184 ft 10 in)
Javelin throw	Nicole Carroll	57.58 m (188 ft 10 in)	Windy Dean	57.10 m (187 ft 4 in)	Lynda Blutreich	56.32 m (184 ft 9 in)
Heptathlon	Kelly Blair-LaBounty	6406 (13.47/1.78/12.34/24.24/6.48/48.10/2:12.23)	Jackie Joyner-Kersee	6403 (13.03/1.78/15.41/24.27/6.71/36.36/2:20.80)	Sharon Hanson	6352 (13.07/1.73/14.23/24.10/5.71/48.76/2:09.68)
