= Sheila Hudson =

American track and field athlete

Sheila Hudson (Olympian)
Personal information
- Nationality: American
- Born: June 30, 1967 (age 59) Würzburg, Germany
- Height: 5-5

Sport
- Sport: Track & Field
- Events: Triple jump, Long jump
- College team: UC Berkeley
- Turned pro: 1990
- Coached by: Randy Huntington
- Retired: 2002

Achievements and titles
- Olympic finals: 10th at 1996 Olympics
- Personal bests: Long jump: 6.73m/22-1 Triple jump: 14.41m/47-3.5
- Updated on May 24, 2016

Dr. Sheila Ann Hudson (born June 30, 1967) is an American former track and field athlete and Olympian, ranked among the all-time greatest U.S. competitors in the women's triple jump. Throughout her career, she won nine U.S. triple jump titles, and set two world bests (World records before the event became an IAAF record event) and nine American records. She previously held the indoor American record in the women's triple jump (46-8.25) as well as the outdoor American record in women's triple jump (47-3.5) with a wind aided all-time best jump of 48-1.25. Hudson won the silver medal at the 1994 IAAF World Cup, finished eighth at the 1995 World Indoor Championships, tenth at the 1996 Olympic Games and fifth at the 1998 IAAF World Cup.

Hudson was a pioneer and advocate in the fight to make the triple jump an Olympic event for women. She represented the United States and placed 10th in the inaugural Olympic women's triple jump competition in the 1996 Atlanta Games.

Following her competitive track and field career, Hudson earned a doctoral degree in Educational Leadership. She has worked as a staff writer for the Sacramento Bee, and as a collegiate coach and athletics administrator.

Hudson is active in championing women's rights and empowering women and girls in sports. She is a member of Women Leaders in College Sports and the American Association of University Women. Hudson previously served on the NCAA Track and Field Committee, as well as the Board of Directors and the Athletes Advisory Committee for USA Track & Field (USATF).

== Early years ==
Born in Würzburg, Germany, Hudson attended Rio Linda High School in Rio Linda, California, where she competed in track and field and played on the girls’ basketball team. Hudson was the Knights’ starting point guard and played on the varsity basketball team all four years during high school. On the track, Hudson competed in the triple jump, long jump, 300-meter hurdles and the 4 × 100 m and 4 × 400 m relays. Hudson captured the 1985 CIF California State Meet title in the triple jump during her senior year and accepted a full track scholarship to attend UC Berkeley.

=== UC Berkeley ===
Hudson attended college at the University of California at Berkeley, where she earned a bachelor's degree in architecture in 1990. She was also recruited by Stanford University, but chose Cal because of its reputation for liberal ideas and social and political activism.

=== College Track & Field career ===
Hudson competed for the Cal track and field team from 1986 to 1990. While at Cal, Hudson was a nine-time All-American and earned six NCAA Division I National Championships – four in the triple jump and two in the long Jump. She holds school records in the triple jump (46-0.75) and long jump (22-1). Hudson was voted Cal's Pac-10 Athlete of the Decade for track and field (1986–96).

=== Career at UC Berkeley ===
Year	Competition	Venue	Position	Event	Notes
1986	NCAA Outdoor Women's Track and Field Championship		5th	Triple jump	
1987	NCAA Outdoor Women's Track and Field Championship		2nd	Long jump	
1987	NCAA Outdoor Women's Track and Field Championship		1st	Triple jump	45-2.5
1988	NCAA Outdoor Women's Track and Field Championship		1st	Triple jump	45-8
1990	NCAA Outdoor Women's Track and Field Championship		1st	Long jump	21-9.5
1990	NCAA Outdoor Women's Track and Field Championship		1st	Triple jump	46-0.75

== Post-collegiate career ==
=== Olympic women’s triple jump advocacy ===
Hudson spent many years as one of the primary athletes advocating for the inclusion of the women's triple jump in the Olympics. After years of lobbying, the International Olympic Committee added the event to the 1996 Olympic Games. Hudson placed 10th for the United States in the inaugural women's triple jump competition in the 1996 Atlanta Olympics.

=== National and international competition ===
In U.S. Championship competition, Hudson is a four-time USA Outdoor triple jump champion (1989, ’90, ’94 and ’95) and a five-time USA Indoor triple jump champion (1990, ’93, ’94, ’95 and ’96). Hudson held the Indoor American triple jump record (46-8.25) for twenty-three years, relinquishing the record in 2017. Sheila set and broke her own Outdoor American triple jump record numerous times between 1987 and 1995, holding the Outdoor American record for seventeen years until it was broken in 2004. Internationally, Hudson won the silver medal at the 1994 IAAF World Cup, won the bronze medal at the 1993 Goodwill Games, finished eighth at the 1995 World Indoor Championships, tenth at the 1996 Olympic Games and fifth at the 1998 IAAF World Cup.

=== USA National Championships ===
Year	Competition	Venue	Position	Event	Notes
1987	USA Outdoor Track and Field Championships	San Jose City College	1st	Triple jump	13.85 m (45 ft 5 1/4 in) WR, AR, CR
1989	USA Outdoor Track and Field Championships	Houston, Texas	1st	Triple jump	13.88 m (45 ft 6 1/4 in)
1990	USA Outdoor Track and Field Championships	Cerritos College	1st	Triple jump	14.07 m (46 ft 1 3/4 in)w
1991	USA Outdoor Track and Field Championships	Downing Stadium	2nd	Triple jump	13.45 m (44 ft 1 1/2 in)
1992	USA Olympic Trials	Tad Gormley Stadium	1st	Triple jump	46-8.25
1993	USA Indoor Track and Field Championships		1st	Triple jump	44-3
1993	USA Outdoor Track and Field Championships	Hayward Field, University of Oregon	2nd	Triple jump	13.66 m (44 ft 9 3/4 in)w
1994	USA Indoor Track and Field Championships		1st	Triple jump	45-3.5
1994	USA Outdoor Track and Field Championships	Tom Black Track, University of Tennessee	1st	Triple jump	14.23 m (46 ft 8 in) =AR, =CR
1995	USA Indoor Track and Field Championships		1st	Triple jump	46-8.25
1995	USA Outdoor Track and Field Championships	Hornet Stadium, California State University, Sacramento	1st	Triple jump	14.66 m (48 ft 1 in)w
1996	USA Indoor Track and Field Championships		1st	Triple jump	46-7.5
1996	USA Olympic Trials	Centennial Olympic Stadium	2nd	Triple jump	14.06 m (46 ft 1 1/2 in)
1997	USA Outdoor Track and Field Championships	IU Carroll Track Stadium, IUPUI	8th	Triple jump	42-4
1998	USA Outdoor Track and Field Championships	Tad Gormley Stadium	1st	Triple jump	13.72 m (45 ft 0 in)
1999	USA Outdoor Track and Field Championships	Hayward Field, University of Oregon	2nd	Triple jump	13.81 m (45 ft 3 1/2 in)
2000	USA Indoor Track and Field Championships		4th	Triple jump	13.10 m (42 ft 11 1/2 in)
2000	USA Olympic Trials	Hornet Stadium, California State University, Sacramento	2nd	Triple jump	13.93 m (45 ft 8 1/4 in)
2001	USA Outdoor Track and Field Championships	Hayward Field, University of Oregon	3rd	Triple jump	13.68 m (44 ft 10 1/2 in)

=== Honors and awards ===
- Pac-12 All-Century Team for track and field (2016)
- Pac-10 Athlete of the Decade for track and field (1986–96)
- Honda Sports Award nominee (1989–90)
- Pac-12 Silver Anniversary Team for track and field (2006)
- UC Berkeley Hall of Fame inductee (1999)
- CIF Sac-Joaquin Section Hall of Fame inductee (2014)
- Inaugural Rio Linda High School Sports Hall of Fame Inductee (2022)

== Post-competitive career ==
=== Sports journalism career ===
At the close of her professional track and field career, Hudson began working in her hometown for the Sacramento Bee newspaper, beginning with an Olympic hopeful diary. She later focused on feature articles as a staff writer in The Bee's sports department from 2000-02.

=== Coaching career ===
Hudson served as an assistant track and field coach at her alma mater, UC Berkeley, from 1992-94. She later served as an assistant track coach at California State University, Los Angeles, from 2002-08. Hudson's tutelage contributed to the following achievements among Cal State LA's jumpers:

- 1 NCAA Division II individual National Champion (triple jump)
- 4 NCAA Division II National Championship Runners Up (triple jump, long jump, high jump)
- 18 NCAA Division II All-Americans
- 12 CCAA individual Conference Champions
- 36 CCAA individual All-Conference Honorees

=== Athletics administration career ===
In 2008, while at Cal State LA, Hudson fully transitioned from collegiate coaching to athletics administration. She served as Cal State LA's Compliance Coordinator and Senior Woman Administrator for two years before being promoted to Associate Athletics Director in 2008. Hudson earned a promotion to Senior Associate Director of Athletics in January 2016 and concurrently served as a campus Deputy Title IX Coordinator. Hudson departed Cal State LA in 2017.

== Education ==
Hudson was the first in her family's history to attend a university. She earned a B.A. in architecture from UC Berkeley in 1990. While working full-time as an athletics administrator, Hudson pursued graduate study at Cal State LA, earning an M.A. in Teaching English to Speakers of Other Languages and a Doctorate in Educational Leadership.

== Authored articles and publications (section under construction) ==
Records
Preceded by Flora Hyacinth	Women's Triple Jump World Record Holder; Not officially ratified by the IAAF; 1987-06-06 – 1987-10-11	Succeeded by Li Huirong
