= Santa Monica Track Club =

American sports association

The Santa Monica Track Club (also known as SMTC) was formed by Joe Douglas as a post-collegiate track club. By the 1980s, the team came to be a major player in worldwide Track and Field competition, with team members setting numerous World and National records. The membership list reads like a Who's Who of Olympic athletes and the SMTC logo became a recognizable icon on the uniforms of those elite athletes.

== History ==
In its first year of existence, 1968 Olympian from Puerto Rico, Willie Rios joined the club and qualified to run in the 1972 Summer Olympics. In 1974, member Reid Harter set the first American Record in the road 30 Kilometer run. By 1976, three team members qualified for the 1976 Summer Olympics.

In 1979, a young Carl Lewis, then known as a top level High School long jumper, joined the club for competitions beyond his collegiate career at the University of Houston. Lewis went on to be the dominant force in sprinting and long jump for the next decade. Coached in the off season by his collegiate coach Tom Tellez, other elite sprinters were attracted to the club, including Carol Lewis, Carl's sister and University of Houston teammates Joe DeLoach, Leroy Burrell and Kirk Baptiste. The club developed an impressive record of Olympic and World Championships, limited in many situations because teammates were the closest competition at the highest level. Lewis and Burrell exchanged the prestigious World Record in the 100 meters four times.

Four members of the club, Michael Marsh, Leroy Burrell, Floyd Heard and Carl Lewis, representing the Santa Monica Track Club tied the world record in the 4×100 meters relay at the Herculis meet in Monaco. The record lasted for four days until it was surpassed by a team representing the USA that consisted of three of the SMTC members, with Dennis Mitchell replacing Heard. The same four members set the World Record in the 4 x 200 meters relay, set at the Mt. SAC Relays in 1994. That record lasted over 20 years until it was surpassed by .05 by a team from Jamaica at the 2014 IAAF World Relays. Also Kevin Young's World Record in the 400 meters hurdles set in winning the 1992 Summer Olympics stood until 1 July 2021.

The club was elected into the Mt. SAC Relays Hall of Fame in 2011.

== Foundation ==
The club is funded through the Santa Monica Track Club Foundation, founded by Ed Stotsenberg (who had the personalized license plate SMTC 1), an early Masters runner who joined the club in the mid-1970s and became its president.

== Notable members ==
- Kirk Baptiste - 1 Olympic medal
- Leroy Burrell - 1 Olympic Gold Medal, 2 World Championship Gold Medals, 2 time World Record holder 100 meter
- Cletus Clark
- Brian Cooper
- Christian Cushing-murray
- Joe DeLoach - 1 Olympic Gold Medal
- Jean Destine - 1996 Olympian
- Mike Durkin
- Danny Everett - 1 Olympic Gold Medal, 1 Bronze, 1 World Championship Gold Medal
- Gary Fanelli - 1988 Olympic Games Marathon, a member of SMTC, 1973 and 1974
- Michelle Finn-Burrell - 1 Olympic Gold Medal
- Johnny Gray - 1 Olympic medal, former United States record 800 meters
- Claudette Groenendaal - 2 time US Champion, Collegiate Record holder 1985-2010 (800 meters)
- Todd Harbour
- Reid Harter
- Floyd Heard
- Mihály Iglói
- Bayano Kamani
- Felix Kitur
- Carl Lewis - 9 Olympic Gold Medals, 1 Silver, 8 World Championship Gold Medals, 3 time World Record holder 100 meters
- Carol Lewis - 1 World Championship Bronze medal
- Steve Lewis - 3 Olympic Gold Medals, 1 Silver
- André Action Jackson
- Khadevis Robinson
- Lewis Johnson
- Earl Jones - 1 Olympic medal
- Jerald Jones
- Jeff Jirele
- George Kersh
- David Mack
- Mike Marsh- 2 Olympic Gold Medals, 1 Silver, 1 World Championship Gold Medal
- Bill McChesney
- Prince Mumba
- Khevin Pratt
- Mark Rafferty
- Willie Ríos
- LaMont Smith - 1 Olympic Gold medal
- Jenny Spangler
- Henry Thomas
- Mark Witherspoon
- Kevin Young - 1 Olympic Gold Medal, 1 World Championship Gold Medal, former World Record holder 400 meters hurdles
