= Ed Stotsenberg =

American activist and writer

Edward Stotsenberg
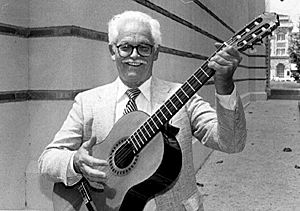
- At USC 1995
- Born: 1912
- Died: 2000 (aged 87–88); Santa Monica, California, U.S
- Occupations: Philanthropist; Accountant; Runner
- Relatives: Dorothy Stotsenberg (Wife); Henry Stotsenberg (Nephew); Shane Stotsenberg (Great Nephew)

Edward G. Stotsenberg (1912 in North Dakota – July 10, 2000 in Santa Monica, California) was an American philanthropist. Originally the accountant for movie star Mary Pickford during the last 20 years of her life, Stotsenberg was one of the trustees of Mary Pickford Foundation established in the 1970s at the wishes of the star.

Santa Monica College benefitted from Stotsenberg's personal benevolence.

A long time runner, Stotsenberg donated the funds to improve the Pepperdine track and field facilities (where portions of the Battle of the Network Stars had previously been held), now named in his honor. He also used these financial management skills to form the foundation to fund the Santa Monica Track Club, which became perhaps the most successful track club of the 1980s, accounting for 25 Olympic medals in a little over a decade. Stotsenberg was the club president for a period of time. As a Masters long distance runner, Stotsenberg won several medals in the World Masters Athletics Championships. At one point in time, Stotsenberg held the World Record for 1500 metres in his age division.

In addition to funding the Santa Monica Track Club he also funded a grant at the University of Southern California to study aging athletes like himself.

Stotsenberg and his wife Dorothy lived in Malibu, California starting in 1949, where they became important members of the small coastal community. She is the author of "My Fifty Years in Malibu" His nephew Henry Stotsenberg assumed the role as head of the Pickford Foundation after his death. His great nephew Shane Stotsenberg is the lead guitarist in the Los Angeles rock band Mystic Braves.
