= 1989 IAAF Grand Prix Final =

- Host city: Fontvieille, Monaco
- Events: 17
- Dates: 1 September
- Main venue: Stade Louis II

The 1989 IAAF Grand Prix Final was the fifth edition of the season-ending competition for the IAAF Grand Prix track and field circuit, organised by the International Association of Athletics Federations. It was held on 1 September at the Stade Louis II in Fontvieille, Monaco. Saïd Aouita (5000 metres) and Paula Ivan (1500 metres) were the overall points winners of the tournament, both repeating their victories from the previous year's competition. Ivan became the first woman to win the series twice. This was also Aouita's third career win at the completion – a feat which never went matched in the event's history.

== Medal summary ==
=== Men ===
Event	Gold		Silver		Bronze	
200 metres	Daniel Sangouma (FRA)	20.23	Robson da Silva (BRA)	20.24	Stefano Tilli (ITA)	20.48
400 metres	Danny Everett (USA)	44.59	Butch Reynolds (USA)	45.06	Gabriel Tiacoh (CIV)	45.13
1500 metres	Abdi Bile (SOM)	3:39.56	Wilfred Kirochi (KEN)	3:40.02	Hervé Phélippeau (FRA)	3:40.25
5000 metres	Saïd Aouita (MAR)	13:06.36	Arturo Barrios (MEX)	13:21.37	Sydney Maree (USA)	13:21.62
110 m hurdles	Roger Kingdom (USA) Colin Jackson (GBR)	13.22	Not awarded		Tonie Campbell (USA)	13.24
Pole vault	Rodion Gataullin (URS)	5.70 m	Philippe Collet (FRA)	5.70 m	Earl Bell (USA)	5.70 m
Long jump	Larry Myricks (USA)	8.54 m	Yusuf Alli (NGR)	8.22 m	Mike Conley, Sr. (USA)	8.12 m
Discus throw	Jürgen Schult (GDR)	67.48 m	Wolfgang Schmidt (FRG)	66.42 m	Luis Delís (CUB)	64.44 m
Javelin throw	Steve Backley (GBR)	84.76 m	Kazuhiro Mizoguchi (JPN)	83.06 m	Sigurður Einarsson (ISL)	82.82 m

=== Women ===
Event	Gold		Silver		Bronze	
100 metres	Merlene Ottey (JAM)	11.04	Pauline Davis (BAH)	11.25	Sheila Echols (USA)	11.37
800 metres	Ana Fidelia Quirot (CUB)	1:59.02	Christine Wachtel (GDR)	1:59.84	Diane Edwards (GBR)	2:00.83
One mile	Paula Ivan (ROM)	4:24.96	Svetlana Kitova (URS)	4:25.52	Doina Melinte (ROM)	4:25.56
3000 metres	Yvonne Murray (GBR)	9:02.58	Elly van Hulst (NED)	9:03.76	PattiSue Plumer (USA)	9:04.00
400 m hurdles	Sandra Farmer-Patrick (USA)	54.60	Anita Protti (SUI)	54.71	Sally Gunnell (GBR)	54.96
High jump	Silvia Costa (CUB)	1.98 m	Jan Wohlschlag (USA)	1.95 m	Heike Henkel (FRG)	1.95 m
Long jump	Galina Chistyakova (URS)	6.84 m	Helga Radtke (GDR)	6.79 m	Vali Ionescu (ROM)	6.73 m
Shot put	Natalya Lisovskaya (URS)	20.03 m	Grit Hammer (GDR)	19.32 m	Stephanie Storp (FRG)	19.07 m

== Points leaders ==
=== Men ===
Event	Gold		Silver		Bronze	
Overall	Saïd Aouita (MAR)	69	Roger Kingdom (USA)	63	Steve Backley (GBR)	63
200 metres	Robson da Silva (BRA)	59	Henry Thomas (USA)	47	Stefano Tilli (ITA)	41
400 metres	Danny Everett (USA)	51	Butch Reynolds (USA)	50	Mohammed Al-Malki (OMN)	45
1500 metres	Abdi Bile (SOM)	61	Wilfred Kirochi (KEN)	50	Kip Cheruiyot (KEN)	47
5000 metres	Arturo Barrios (MEX)	60	Saïd Aouita (MAR)	51	Sydney Maree (USA)	43
110 hurdles	Roger Kingdom (USA)	63	Tonie Campbell (USA)	57	Colin Jackson (GBR)	53
Pole vault	Rodion Gataullin (URS)	61	Sergey Bubka (URS)	55	Earl Bell (USA)	40
Long jump	Larry Myricks (USA)	53	Mike Powell (USA)	53	Mike Conley, Sr. (USA)	41
Discus throw	Wolfgang Schmidt (FRG)	52	Luis Delís (CUB)	50	Erik de Bruin (NED)	37
Javelin throw	Steve Backley (GBR)	63	Kazuhiro Mizoguchi (JPN)	54	Sigurður Einarsson (ISL)	45

=== Women ===
Event	Gold		Silver		Bronze	
Overall	Paula Ivan (ROM)	67	Galina Chistyakova (URS)	63	Sandra Farmer-Patrick (USA)	63
100 metres	Merlene Ottey (JAM)	63	Sheila Echols (USA)	49	Pauline Davis (BAH)	47
800 metres	Ana Fidelia Quirot (CUB)	63	Gabi Lesch (FRG)	39	Christine Wachtel (GDR)	37
One mile	Paula Ivan (ROM)	51	Doina Melinte (ROM)	51	Svetlana Kitova (URS)	49
3000 metres	PattiSue Plumer (USA)	55	Elly van Hulst (NED)	39	Yvonne Murray (GBR)	34
400 hurdles	Sandra Farmer-Patrick (USA)	63	Sally Gunnell (GBR)	45	Schowonda Williams (USA)	41
High jump	Jan Wohlschlag (USA)	59	Silvia Costa (CUB)	48	Tamara Bykova (URS)	38
Long jump	Galina Chistyakova (URS)	63	Marieta Ilcu (ROM)	44	Vali Ionescu (ROM)	38
Shot put	Natalya Lisovskaya (URS)	61	Grit Hammer (GDR)	44	Stephanie Storp (FRG)	43
