= Dan & Dave =

Advertising campaign

Dan & Dave was an advertising and merchandising campaign by American shoe manufacturer Reebok during the build-up to the 1992 Summer Olympics in Barcelona. The promotion was meant to generate excitement and support for the Olympic competition between American decathletes Dan O'Brien and Dave Johnson. However, the campaign had to be modified when O'Brien failed to qualify for the Olympics.

== History ==
External audio
- "The Trials of Dan and Dave", 30 for 30 Podcasts (2017) 53m43s.

The campaign began with television commercials aired during Super Bowl XXVI, January 26, 1992. O'Brien and Johnson, though rivals, were favored to win medals in Barcelona, and Reebok, which had recently lost U.S. market share to Nike, was hoping to rebound with their endorsement. The series of television spots featured the same general message: "Who will be the world's greatest athlete – Dan or Dave? To be settled this summer in Barcelona."

Reebok's plan went awry five weeks before the Games began, when O'Brien failed to qualify for the American Olympic team by missing the pole vault during the Olympic trials in New Orleans. This resulted in Reebok modifying the television spots to feature Dan cheering Dave on.

== Aftermath ==
"Dan & Dave" made O'Brien and Johnson— both unknowns outside the world of track and field—into household names in the United States. The campaign led to both receiving endorsements from other companies, including O'Brien with Nike in 1993. Despite a foot injury, Johnson won a bronze medal in Barcelona. He retired from competition shortly after the Games. O'Brien went on to win a gold medal at the 1996 Summer Olympics in Atlanta. Both were inducted to the Oregon Sports Hall of Fame together in 2005. The "Dan & Dave" ads were parodied by Ryder Trucks with both athletes participating in a mock biathlon where they started a foot race and continued it with a race in rental trucks. In the ads, O'Brien easily completes his reservation at Ryder and continues on in a truck, while a frustrated Johnson is held up at a second-rate truck service.

In June 2017 Johnson and O'Brien were the subjects of and participants in the ESPN Radio 30 for 30 podcast "The Trials of Dan and Dave" about the famous ad campaign and its aftermath.
