= 1991 IAAF World Indoor Championships – Men's 1500 metres =

The men's 1500 metres event at the 1991 IAAF World Indoor Championships was held on 8 and 9 March.

== Medalists ==
Gold	Silver	Bronze
Noureddine Morceli; Algeria	Fermín Cacho; Spain	Mário Silva; Portugal

== Results ==
=== Heats ===
First 4 of each heat (Q) and next 2 fastest (q) qualified for the semifinals.

Rank	Heat	Name	Nationality	Time	Notes
1	2	Mário Silva	Portugal	3:43.70	Q
2	2	Fermín Cacho	Spain	3:43.73	Q
3	2	Abdelaziz Sahere	Morocco	3:43.99	Q
4	2	Han Kulker	Netherlands	3:44.04	Q
5	1	Noureddine Morceli	Algeria	3:44.06	Q
6	2	Michael Busch	Germany	3:44.57	q
7	1	Jeff Atkinson	United States	3:44.83	Q
8	2	Terrance Herrington	United States	3:44.86	q
9	1	Sergey Melnikov	Soviet Union	3:44.91	Q
10	1	Marcus O'Sullivan	Ireland	3:44.91	Q
11	1	Víctor Rojas	Spain	3:45.43	
12	1	Rachid El Basir	Morocco	3:45.83	
13	1	Robin van Helden	Netherlands	3:46.33	
14	1	David Kibet	Kenya	3:47.33	
15	2	José Moreira	Portugal	3:47.57	
16	2	Davide Tirelli	Italy	3:47.63	
17	1	Alemayehu Roba	Ethiopia	3:48.83	
	1	Miroslav Chochkov	Bulgaria	DNS	
	2	Jacinto Navarrete	Colombia	DNS	

=== Final ===
Rank	Name	Nationality	Time	Notes
1st place, gold medalist(s)	Noureddine Morceli	Algeria	3:41.57	
2nd place, silver medalist(s)	Fermín Cacho	Spain	3:42.68	
3rd place, bronze medalist(s)	Mário Silva	Portugal	3:43.85	
4	Marcus O'Sullivan	Ireland	3:44.79	
5	Han Kulker	Netherlands	3:45.93	
6	Jeff Atkinson	United States	3:46.25	
7	Michael Busch	Germany	3:46.72	
8	Abdelaziz Sahere	Morocco	3:47.04	
9	Terrance Herrington	United States	3:47.19	
10	Sergey Melnikov	Soviet Union	3:49.78	
