= Athletics at the 1995 Pan American Games – Men's 1500 metres =

Men's 1500 metres at the Pan American Games

The men's 1500 metres event at the 1995 Pan American Games was held at the Estadio Atletico "Justo Roman" on 19 March.

== Results ==
Rank	Name	Nationality	Time	Notes
1st place, gold medalist(s)	Joaquim Cruz	Brazil	3:40.26	
2nd place, silver medalist(s)	Terrance Herrington	United States	3:40.97	
3rd place, bronze medalist(s)	Jason Pyrah	United States	3:42.34	
4	Leonardo Malgor	Argentina	3:43.18	
5	Edgar de Oliveira	Brazil	3:43.98	
6	Iván Gómez	Guatemala	3:45.96	
7	José López	Venezuela	3:50.44	
8	Terrance Armstrong	Bermuda	3:53.71	
9	Porfirio Méndez	Paraguay	3:58.33	
10	Mariano Tarilo	Argentina	4:00.78	
11	Ian Godwin	Saint Kitts and Nevis	4:11.07	
12	Neehal Philogene	Dominica	4:11.59	
	Silvio Guerra	Ecuador	DNS	
	Javier Soto	Puerto Rico	DNS	
