= 1993 USA Outdoor Track and Field Championships =

- Dates: June 16–19
- Host city: Eugene, Oregon, United States
- Venue: Hayward Field

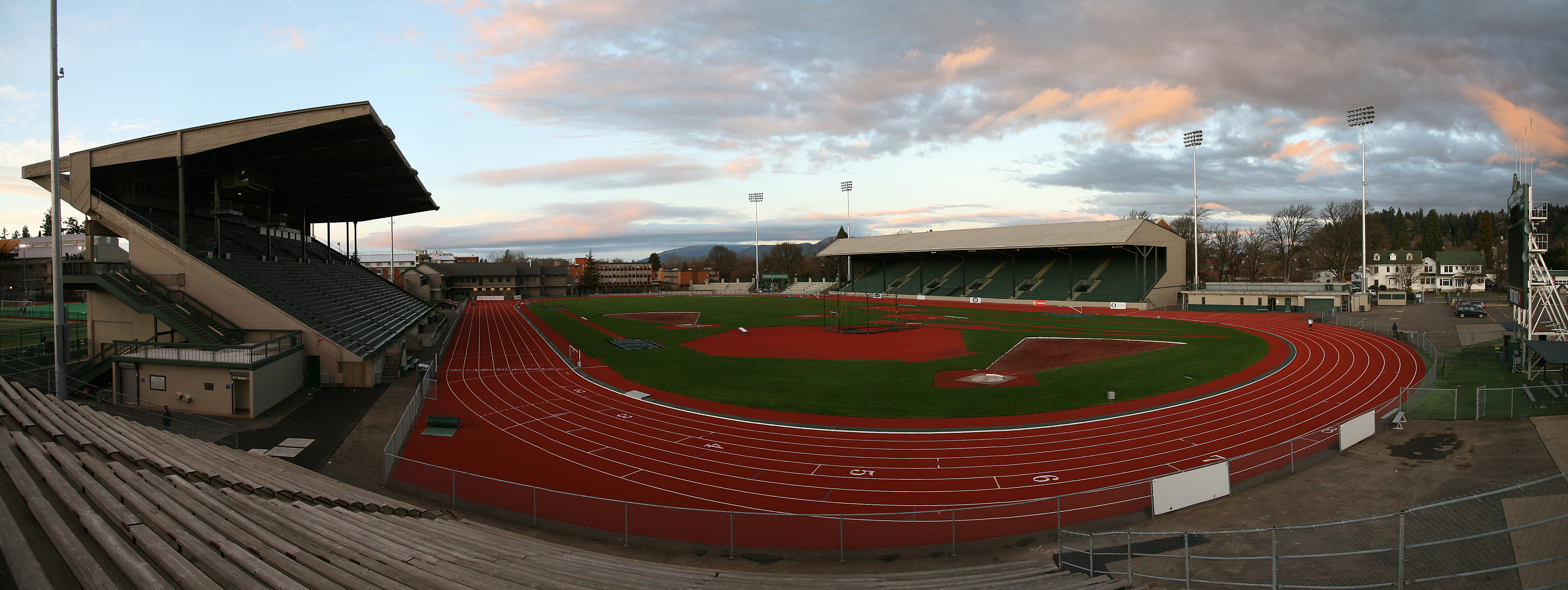
Hayward Field hosted the 1999 competition

The 1993 USA Outdoor Track and Field Championships took place between June 16–19 at Hayward Field in Eugene, Oregon. This was the first USA Outdoor Track and Field Championships organized by the newly named USA Track and Field (USATF). The competition acted as a way of selecting the United States team for the 1993 World Championships in Athletics in Stuttgart, Germany August 13–22 later that year.

== Results ==
=== Men track events ===
Event	Gold		Silver		Bronze	
100 meters (+4.8 m/s)	Andre Cason	9.85w	Dennis Mitchell	9.85w	Carl Lewis	9.90w
200 meters (+2.5 m/s)	Mike Marsh	19.97w	Carl Lewis	20.07w	Jason Hendrix	20.35w
400 meters	Michael Johnson	43.74 CR	Butch Reynolds	44.12	Quincy Watts	44.24
800 meters	Mark Everett	1:44.43	Johnny Gray	1:44.67	José Parrilla	1:45.13
1500 meters	Bill Burke	3:42.74	Mark Dailey	3:42.92	Jim Spivey	3:42.92
5000 meters	Matt Giusto	13:23.60	Bob Kennedy	13:25.51	Ken Martin	13:44.68
10,000 meters	Todd Williams	28:02.05	Steve Plasencia	28:02.41	Dan Nelson	28:02.44
110 meters hurdles (+1.5 m/s)	Jack Pierce	13.36	Tony Dees	13.37	Mark Crear	13.41
400 meters hurdles	Kevin Young	47.69	Derrick Adkins	48.69	David Patrick	48.95
3000 meters steeplechase	Marc Davis	8:20.93	Mark Croghan	8:21.37	Brian Diemer	8:22.41
20 kilometres race walk	Allen James	1:29:09	Jonathan Matthews	1:30:45	Doug Fournier	1:31:25

=== Men field events ===
Event	Gold		Silver		Bronze	
High jump	Hollis Conway	2.31 m (7 ft 6 3/4 in)	Rick Noji	2.25 m (7 ft 4 1/2 in)	Tony Barton	2.25 m (7 ft 4 1/2 in)
Pole vault	Scott Huffman	18-8.25 m (31 ft 11 3/4 in)	Dean Starkey	18-8.25 m (31 ft 11 3/4 in)	Mike Holloway	18-6.5 m (37 ft 8 3/4 in)
Long jump	Mike Powell	8.53 m (27 ft 11 3/4 in)w	Erick Walder	8.46 m (27 ft 9 in)w	Joe Greene	8.33 m (27 ft 3 3/4 in)w
Triple jump	Mike Conley	17.69 m (58 ft 1/4 in)w	Kenny Harrison	17.27 m (56 ft 7 3/4 in)	Reggie Jones	17.04 m (55 ft 10 3/4 in)w
Shot put	Randy Barnes	21.28 m (69 ft 9 3/4 in)	Mike Stulce	21.14 m (69 ft 4 1/4 in)	Kevin Toth	20.30 m (66 ft 7 in)
Discus throw	Anthony Washington	63.24 m (207 ft 5 in)	Mike Buncic	61.72 m (202 ft 5 in)	Mike Gravelle	61.12 m (200 ft 6 in)
Hammer throw	Lance Deal	78.10 m (256 ft 2 in)	Jim Driscoll	71.74 m (235 ft 4 in)	Kevin McMahon	68.86 m (225 ft 11 in)
Javelin throw	Tom Pukstys	83.06 m (272 ft 6 in)	Art Skipper	76.60 m (251 ft 3 in)	Ed Kaminski	73.12 m (239 ft 10 in)
Decathlon	Dan O'Brien	8331	Steve Fritz	8176w	Rob Muzzio	8057

=== Women track events ===
Event	Gold		Silver		Bronze	
100 meters (+2.2 m/s)	Gail Devers	11.03w	Gwen Torrence	11.07w	Michelle Finn	11.13w
200 meters (+2.4 m/s)	Gwen Torrence	22.57w	Dannette Young-Stone	22.68w	Michelle Finn	22.81w
400 meters	Jearl Miles	50.43	Natasha Kaiser-Brown	50.93	Michelle Collins	51.77
800 meters	Joetta Clark	2:01.47	Amy Wickus	2:02.22	Julie Jenkins	2:02.23
1500 meters	Annette Peters	4:11.53	Alisa Harvey	4:12.43	Gina Procaccio	4:12.51
3000 meters	Annette Peters	8:48.59	Shelly Steely	8:52.99	Sheila Carrozza	8:55.03
5000 meters	Chris McNamara	16:11.85	Carmen Troncoso	16:24.29	Kate Fonshell	16:27.30
10,000 meters	Lynn Jennings	31:57.83 CR	Anne Marie Lauck	32:00.37	Elaine Van Blunk	32:07.19
100 meters hurdles (+2.6 m/s)	Lynda Tolbert	12.72w	Gail Devers	12.73w	Dawn Bowles	12.89w
400 meters hurdles	Sandra Farmer-Patrick	53.96	Kim Batten	54.57	Tonya Buford	54.63
2000 meters steeplechase	Marisa Sutera	7:27.3	Tami Micham-Grimes	7:45.0	Kelly Conery	8:16.6
10 kilometres race walk	Debbi Lawrence	45:55	Teresa Vaill	46:04	Sara Standley	48:16

=== Women field events ===
Event	Gold		Silver		Bronze	
High jump	Tanya Hughes-Jones	1.90 m (6 ft 2 3/4 in)	Connie Teaberry	1.89 m (6 ft 2 1/4 in)	Sue Rembao	1.89 m (6 ft 2 1/4 in)
Long jump	Jackie Joyner-Kersee	7.02 m (23 ft 1/4 in)	Sheila Echols	6.65 m (21 ft 9 3/4 in)w	Sharon Jewell	6.57 m (21 ft 6 1/2 in)w
Triple jump	Claudia Haywood	13.86 m (45 ft 5 1/2 in)w	Sheila Hudson	13.66 m (44 ft 9 3/4 in)w	Cynthea Rhodes	13.48 m (44 ft 2 1/2 in)w
Shot put	Connie Price-Smith	19.02 m (62 ft 4 3/4 in)	Ramona Pagel	17.71 m (58 ft 1 in)	Stevanie Wadsworth	17.14 m (56 ft 2 3/4 in)
Discus throw	Connie Price-Smith	63.52 m (208 ft 4 in)	Kris Kuehl	60.16 m (197 ft 4 in)	Carla Garrett	58.94 m (193 ft 4 in)
Hammer throw	Sonja Fitts	54.92 m (180 ft 2 in)	Liz Legault	53.48 m (175 ft 5 in)	Bonnie Edmondson	52.92 m (173 ft 7 in)
Javelin throw	Donna Mayhew	62.98 m (206 ft 7 in)	Heather Berlin	55.68 m (182 ft 8 in)	Erica Wheeler	55.20 m (181 ft 1 in)
Heptathlon	Jackie Joyner-Kersee	6770	Kym Carter	6038	DeDee Nathan	6038

== See also ==
- United States Olympic Trials (track and field)
