= Tom Tellez =

Thomas K. Tellez (born 1933) is an American track and field (athletics) coach, noted in particular because of his contributions to the sport in the areas of kinesiology, physiology and biomechanics.

== Life and career ==
Tellez attended Whittier College as a student athlete and started coaching in the military in the 1950s. He then coached at Buena Park High School and Whittier High School in California. He soon moved on to coaching positions at Fullerton Junior College in California, and next for UCLA, where he was the field events coach. In 1976 he became the head coach at the University of Houston, where he ran the program until the late 1990s. During the 1980s and 1990s Tellez also doubled as a coach for the Santa Monica Track Club, which produced some of the world's leading competitors.

His most notable athlete was long jumper and sprinter Carl Lewis.

Tellez has also coached such world class track and field athletes as Leroy Burrell, Mike Marsh, Kirk Baptiste, Joe DeLoach, Carol Lewis, Willie Banks, Mike Tully, Michelle Finn-Burrell, Frank Rutherford, and many others.

Tellez had many of his research papers published in coaching journals, and helped design coaching education throughout the world. He was the head coach of the United States Track and Field team at the 1991 World Championships in Tokyo.

Tellez is semi-retired from coaching but still holds clinics and consults with active coaches.

The Tom Tellez Track at Carl Lewis International Complex at the University of Houston is named after Tellez. He was Inducted into the Texas Track and Field Coaches Hall of Fame, Class of 2011.

== Awards and Accolades ==
- World Athletics Awards - Coaching Achievement Award：2014

In 2016, Tellez was awarded the Legend Coach Award by USA Track & Field.
