= Tom Tellez Track at Carl Lewis International Complex =

Stadium in Houston, Texas

Coordinates: 29°43′35″N 95°20′53″W

Carl Lewis International Complex
- Interactive map of Carl Lewis International Complex
- Full name: Tom Tellez Track at the Carl Lewis International Complex
- Address: 3604 Elgin Street; Houston, TX; United States
- Owner: University of Houston
- Operator: Univ. of Houston Athletics
- Capacity: 2,500
- Type: Stadium
- Current use: Soccer; Track and field

Construction
- Groundbreaking: 1999
- Opened: 2001; 25 years ago
- Renovated: 2016
- Cost: $4 Million

Tenants
- Houston Cougars (NCAA) teams: women's soccer (2000-Present); track & field (2000-Present)

Website
- uhcougars.com/facilities-tellez

The Carl Lewis International Complex, also known as simply "Tom Tellez Track", is a stadium in Houston, Texas that serves as home to the Houston Cougars men's and women's outdoor track and field teams and women's soccer team.

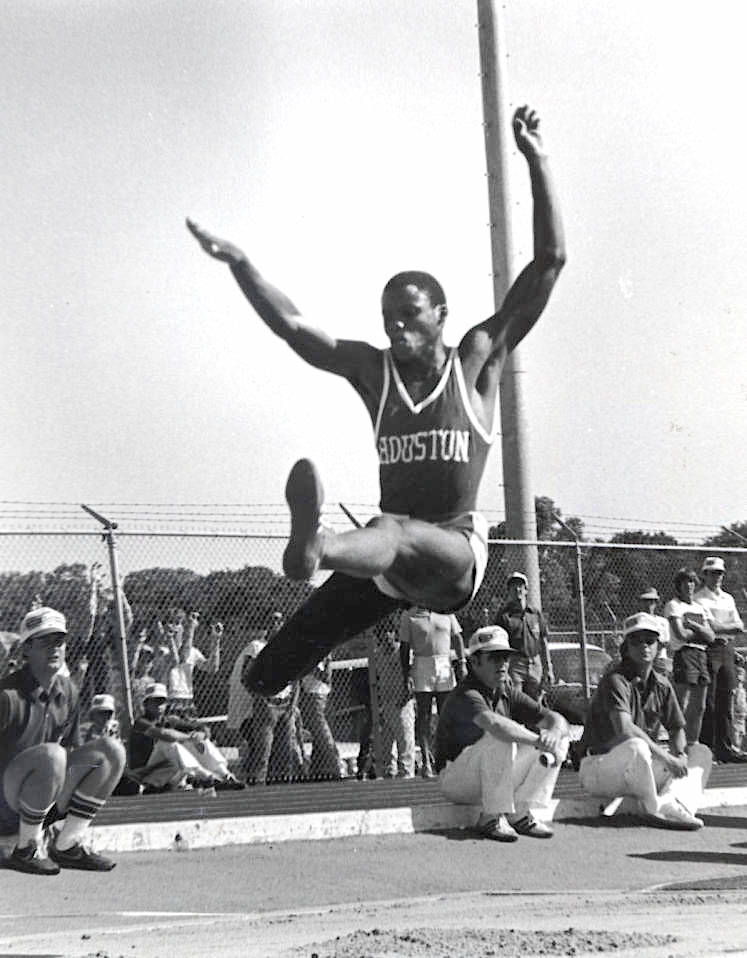
Carl Lewis competing for Houston. The stadium is named after him

The facility is named after Tom Tellez and Carl Lewis, two of the most notable individuals to have been associated with the program.

The track features a European style design with wider curves and shorter straightaways than most U.S. tracks to enhance the speed of runners.
