= Fermín Cacho =

Spanish middle-distance runner

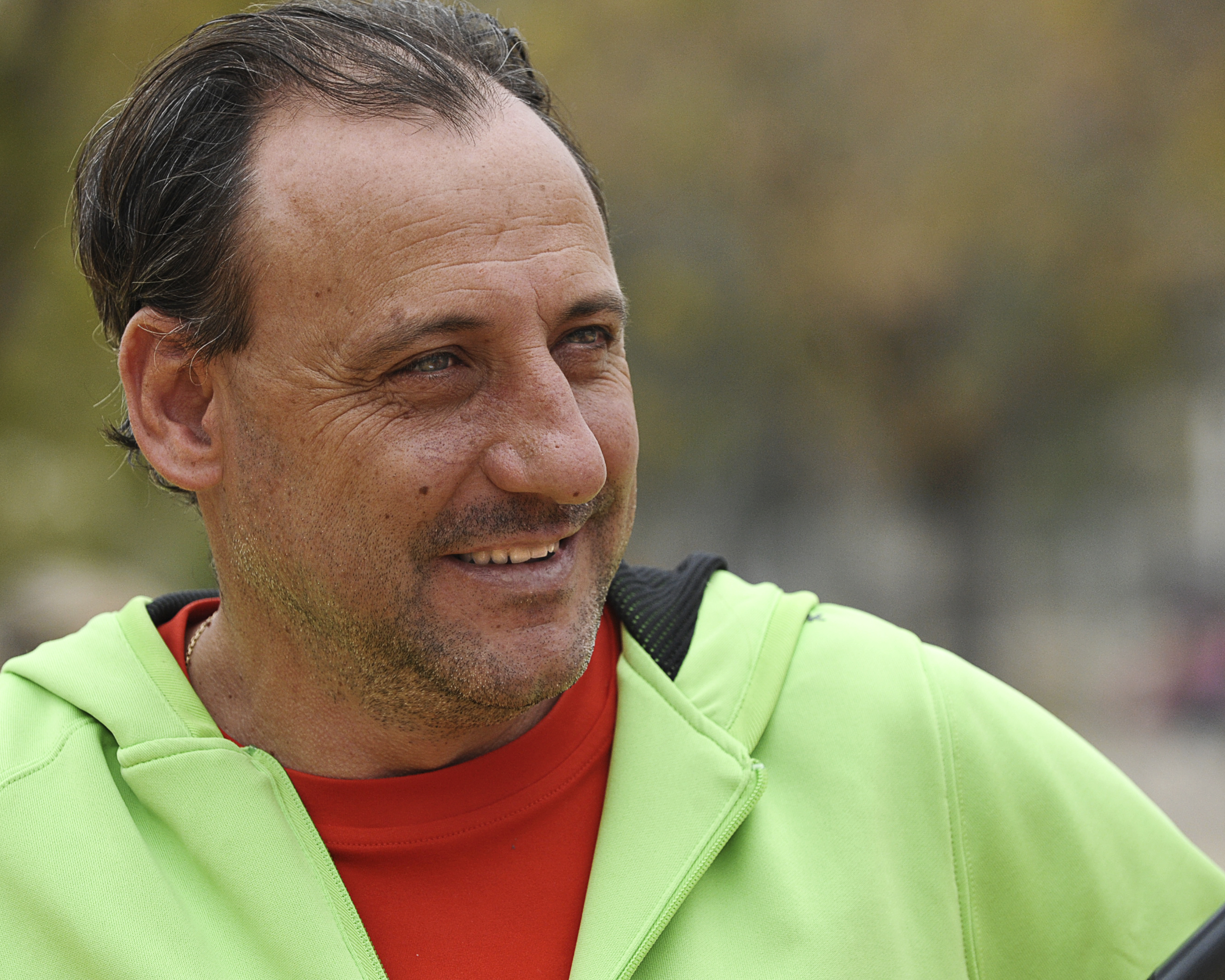
- Cacho in November 2011

Personal information
- Born: Fermín Cacho Ruiz; 16 February 1969 (age 57) Ágreda, Spain
Medal record
Men's athletics
Representing Spain
Olympic Games
Gold medal – first place	1992 Barcelona	1500 m
Silver medal – second place	1996 Atlanta	1500 m
World Championships
Silver medal – second place	1993 Stuttgart	1500 m
Silver medal – second place	1997 Athens	1500 m
World Indoor Championships
Silver medal – second place	1991 Seville	1500 m
European Championships
Gold medal – first place	1994 Helsinki	1500 m
Bronze medal – third place	1998 Budapest	1500 m
European Indoor Championships
Silver medal – second place	1990 Glasgow	1500 m

Fermín Cacho Ruiz (born 16 February 1969) is a Spanish track and field athlete, winner of the gold medal in the 1500m at the 1992 Summer Olympics in Barcelona and the silver medal in the 1500m at the 1996 Summer Olympics in Atlanta.

Born in Ágreda, Spain, Cacho had an enviable competitive record in the 1500 m, but it was not until late in his career that he produced a time of corresponding quality.

Cacho's first notable result came in 1990, when he finished second in the 1500 m at the European Indoor Championships in Glasgow. At the 1991 World Indoor Championships in Seville, Cacho finished again second in the 1500 m, behind Noureddine Morceli.

At the Olympic Games in Barcelona, Cacho was not considered a serious gold medal prospect. But the Olympic 1500 m final was run at a very pedestrian pace, and Cacho positioned himself perfectly in the final lap, and outsprinted his rivals, with a last lap of 50.6 seconds, to win the gold medal in 3:40.12.

In 1993 at Stuttgart in World Championships, Cacho finished second, but took the 1500 m title at the European Championships in Helsinki in the next year. In World Championships at Gothenburg, Cacho only finished in eighth place.

After a relatively lean year in 1995, Cacho was back to his best in the early part of the 1996 season, leading up to the Olympic Games in Atlanta. Although Cacho was the defending Olympic 1500 m champion, the final in Atlanta was considered to be a match race between Morceli and Hicham El Guerrouj, who had filled the first two places at the previous year's World Championships. Approaching the completion of the third lap, Morceli was leading from El Guerrouj, when suddenly the Moroccan tripped and fell. In taking evasive action, Cacho was forced to leap over the fallen El Guerrouj, in a manoeuvre which he later estimated had lost him 5 metres of ground to Morceli, who had commenced his final lap sprint for the finish. Cacho chased Morceli around the last lap, but was unable to catch him. In the end Morceli won by 5 metres from the second-placed Cacho.

At the World Championships in Athens in 1997, Cacho won a silver medal again, and at the end of the same season he finally managed to run his world class time, when he finished second at the 1500 m behind El Guerrouj with a time of 3:28.95, which moved him to third on the all-time world list behind Morceli and El Guerrouj. He won the bronze medal at the 1998 European Championships in Budapest, and finished fourth in the World Championships at Seville in 1999. Cacho suffered an Achilles' tendon injury in 2000, causing him to miss the opportunity to add to his Olympic gold and silver medals at 2000 Summer Olympics in Sydney.

He held the European record at 1500 m with a time of 3:28.95 for 16 years (1997–2013), until Mo Farah broke it with a time of 3:28.81.

== International competitions ==
Year	Competition	Venue	Position	Event	Notes
Representing Spain
1987	European Junior Championships	Birmingham, United Kingdom	12th	1500 m	4:00.58
1988	World Junior Championships	Sudbury, Canada	3rd	1500 m	3:47.31
1989	World Cup	Barcelona, Spain	6th	1500 m	3:40.34
1990	European Indoor Championships	Glasgow, United Kingdom	2nd	1500 m	3:44.61
1990	European Championships	Split, Yugoslavia	11th	1500 m	3:42.21
1991	World Indoor Championships	Seville, Spain	2nd	1500 m	3:42.68
1991	World Championships	Tokyo, Japan	5th	1500 m	3:35.62
1992	Olympic Games	Barcelona, Spain	1st	1500 m	3:40.12
1992	World Cup	Havana, Cuba	4th	1500 m	3:42.78^{1}
1993	Mediterranean Games	Narbonne, France	2nd	1500 m	3:32.43
1993	World Championships	Stuttgart, Germany	2nd	1500 m	3:35.56
1994	European Championships	Helsinki, Finland	1st	1500 m	3:35.27
1995	World Indoor Championships	Barcelona, Spain	6th	1500 m	3:45.46
1995	World Championships	Gothenburg, Sweden	8th	1500 m	3:37.02
1996	Olympic Games	Atlanta, United States	2nd	1500 m	3:36.40
1997	World Championships	Athens, Greece	2nd	1500 m	3:36.63
1998	European Championships	Budapest, Hungary	3rd	1500 m	3:42.13
1999	World Championships	Seville, Spain	4th	1500 m	3:31.34

^{1}Representing Europe

== Personal bests ==
Outdoor

- 800 metres – 1:45.37 (Albacete 1991)
- 1000 metres – 2:16.13 (Andújar 1993)
- 1500 metres – 3:28.95 (Zürich 1997)
- One mile – 3:49.56 (Oslo 1996)
- 3000 metres – 7:37.02 (Seville 1999)
- 5000 metres – 13:46.65 (Seville 2002)

Indoor

- 800 metres – 1:46.79 (Seville 1993)
- 1000 metres – 2:20.18 (Madrid 1992)
- 1500 metres – 3:35.29 (Seville 1991)
- 3000 metres – 7:36.61 (Stuttgart 1996)

Records
Preceded by Steve Cram	European record holder men's 1500 m 13 August 1997 – 19 July 2013	Succeeded by Mo Farah
