= Willie Ríos =

Puerto Rican middle-distance runner

Personal information
- Nationality: Puerto Rican
- Born: 11 February 1949 (age 76) San Juan, Puerto Rico

Sport
- Sport: Middle-distance running
- Event: 1500 metres

Willie Ríos (born 11 February 1949) is a Puerto Rican middle-distance runner. He competed in the men's 1500 metres at the 1968 Summer Olympics. He helped coach 1996 U.S. Olympic Trials Marathon winner Jenny Spangler.
