= Felix Kitur =

Kenyan middle-distance track runner

Personal information
- Nationality: Kenyan
- Born: April 17, 1987 (age 39) Eldoret, Kenya

Sport
- Sport: Track
- Event(s): 800 meters, 1000 meters, 1500 meters
- College team: VMI
- Club: Santa Monica Track Club

Achievements and titles
- Personal best(s): 800 meters: 1:45.13; 1500 meters: 3:42.53
- Updated on 11-21-14

Felix Kitur (born April 17, 1987) is a middle-distance track runner who specializes in the 800 metres. Running for Virginia Military Institute, he qualified for the NCAA Men's Division I Outdoor Track and Field Championships four times, before which he became a full-time professional for Santa Monica Track Club. He competes for Kenya internationally.

== Running career ==
=== Collegiate ===
Kitur attended and ran for Virginia Military Institute. He ran the NCAA Men's Division I Outdoor Track and Field Championships on four occasions. In his freshman year he was ranked as the fastest college freshman in the 800-meter discipline in the United States.

=== Post-collegiate ===
Kitur pursued track after college, and began training full-time at Santa Monica Track Club. He represented Kenya in the 800-meter at an international track meet in Bilbao, Spain in 2013. On May 17, 2013, Kitur was given a DQ (disqualification) mark for a lane violation after running what would have been a personal best time of 1:44.84 (min:sec) in the 800 metres.
