= Jan Wohlschlag =

American high jumper (born 1958)

Personal information
- Born: July 14, 1958 (age 67)

Sport
- Sport: Track and field
Medal record
Representing United States
Pan American Games
Bronze medal – third place	1991 Havana	High Jump

Jan Chesbro-Wohlschlag (born July 14, 1958) is a retired high jumper from the United States, who set her personal best on July 1, 1989, jumping 2.00 metres at a meet in Oslo, Norway. She is a two-time indoor and outdoor (1988 and 1989) USA national champion.

== International competitions ==
Year	Competition	Venue	Position	Notes
Representing United States
1986	Goodwill Games	Moscow, Soviet Union	10th	1.80 m
1989	World Indoor Championships	Budapest, Hungary	5th	1.91 m
1989	Grand Prix Final	Fontvieille, Monaco	2nd	1.95 m
1989	World Cup	Barcelona, Spain	5th	1.91 m
1990	Goodwill Games	Seattle, United States	5th	1.89 m
1991	Pan American Games	Havana, Cuba	3rd	1.80 m

Sporting positions
Preceded by (United States) Coleen Sommer	USA National High Jump Champion; 1988 — 1989	Succeeded by (United States) Yolanda Henry
