= Jenny Spangler =

American long-distance runner

Personal information
- Born: July 20, 1963 (age 62) Rockford, Illinois, United States

Sport
- Country: United States
- Sport: Running
- Event: Distance
- College team: Iowa
- Club: Santa Monica Track Club

Jenny Spangler (born July 20, 1963) is an American long-distance runner. She competed in Atlanta, GA in the women's marathon at the 1996 Summer Olympics, but dropped out, along with 20 other women. By virtue of winning the Olympic Trials in 2:29:54, she was also the 1996 United States national champion in the marathon. She had run the best time of any U.S. Junior in 1983, clocking 2:33:52 at the Duluth, Minnesota point-to-point Grandma's Marathon. In 1984, she finished the Trials in 2:40:18, in 1988, 2:44.59, and in 2000, in 2:36:30, for 9th place. In 2003 Spangler set a Masters American Record at the Chicago Marathon.
