= Edie Boyer =

American discus thrower (born 1966)

- Born: 1966 (age 59–60)
- Known for: Discus thrower

Edie Boyer (born February 21, 1966) is a retired female discus thrower from the United States. She set her personal best (62.92 metres) in the women's discus throw event on May 16, 1998, at a meet in Minnesota. The result is world record for deaf athletes, as Boyer is 80% hearing impaired after a struggle with meningitis at the age of 10 months. Boyer was the 1995 USA women's discus champion and competed at two World Championships (1995 and 1997) during her career.

She was on the North Dakota State University track and field and also the NDSU women's basketball team while a student there from 1984 to 1989.

Before this, she was a hockey player for the Minnesota Checkers, winning the national title three times from 1981 to 1983.
