= Sharon Hanson =

American heptathlete

Personal information
- Born: September 24, 1965 (age 60) Lake Charles, Louisiana, United States

Sport
- Sport: Track and field
- Club: Cal Poly Mustangs
Medal record
Representing United States
Pan American Games
Silver medal – second place	1991 Havana	Heptathlon

Sharon Hanson-Lowery (née Hainer, born September 24, 1965) is an American former heptathlete. Her personal best score was 6352 points, achieved in 1996.

== Achievements ==
Year	Tournament	Venue	Result	Event
1991	Pan American Games	Havana, Cuba	2nd	Heptathlon
1996	Olympic Games	Atlanta, Georgia, United States	9th	Heptathlon
