= Dave Johnson (decathlete) =

American decathlete (born 1963)

Personal information
- Full name: David Allen Johnson
- Born: April 7, 1963 (age 63) Missoula, Montana, U.S.
Medal record
Men's athletics
Representing United States
Summer Olympics
Bronze medal – third place	1992 Barcelona	Decathlon
Goodwill Games
Gold medal – first place	1990 Seattle	Decathlon
Universiade
Gold medal – first place	1989 Duisburg	Decathlon

David Allen Johnson (born April 7, 1963) is a former Olympic decathlete from the United States. A native of Montana, he grew up in Missoula and Corvallis, Oregon. He was part of Reebok's "Dan & Dave" advertising campaign, with fellow decathlete Dan O'Brien, leading up to the 1992 Summer Olympics in Barcelona, Spain, where he won a bronze medal in the decathlon. After retiring from competitive athletics he became a school teacher and administrator, serving as athletic director of Corban University in Salem, Oregon starting in 2009. Johnson accepted a position as Director with the Fellowship of Christian Athletes Oregon in June 2012. On November 14, 2012, Johnson resigned from Corban to devote more time to the Fellowship of Christian Athletes. He now coaches pole vault & hurdles at South Salem High School.

== Early life ==
David Johnson was born in Missoula, Montana. As a child he attended C. S. Porter Elementary School and later attended Sentinel and would have graduated from Big Sky High School. Johnson's family moved to Corvallis, Oregon, in 1980, and he attended Crescent Valley High School, graduating in 1981. He was involved in a series of petty thefts as a teenager, primarily stealing soda pop and beer from local distributors with an assortment of childhood friends until one of them was caught and informed on the rest. He later detailed his experiences to reporters prior to the Barcelona Olympic games and used the material for his book and speaking tour as an example on how to turn one's life around.

During adolescence Johnson was afflicted with Osgood-Schlatter disease in both knees that kept him from participating in high school sports for the most part. During his junior high years he excelled in track, touch football and was on a Kiwanis basketball team for two years. In elementary school he played organized Little League baseball and had some familiarity with boxing.

== Athletics ==
Even as a child Johnson was naturally fit and coordinated from neighborhood activities. He first tried football and track his senior year in high school. He played college football at Azusa Pacific University as a safety in 1982 and 1983. At Azusa he started to compete in the decathlon – at 6 ft 2 1/2 in (189.2 cm), he put his innate abilities and his constant physical training to use and began setting records. He graduated from the school in 1986 with a bachelor's degree in psychology, and later earned a master's degree in 2003 from the school in special education. After several years he was generally acknowledged as the best decathlete to date. At this time Dan O'Brien appeared on the scene and began to provide Dave with his first real competition. O'Brien and Johnson became good friends and consistently placed first and second in most events. O'Brien eventually began to be considered the best overall decathlete, but Johnson earned the recognition as the best at 2nd day events. Johnson was a member of the 1988 U.S. Olympic team.

For the 1992 Summer Olympics the team of "Dan & Dave" was promoted as the inevitable winners in the decathlon and the question of who would take first and who would be second was widely debated. Dan failed to qualify for the team when he no-heighted on the pole vault, leaving Dave as the presumed gold medal winner. Unfortunately, Johnson experienced a stress fracture in his left foot on the first day of events. He put on a shoe two sizes larger, laced it up tight, competed anyway and won the bronze medal. Johnson's endorsement career continued for at least a year after the Barcelona Olympic Games and included Oakley sunglasses, Pert shampoo, Ryder trucks, and Reebok shoes. He won the 1993 and 1994 Superstars competitions.

== Personal bests ==
Information from World Athletics profile unless otherwise noted.

As of July 3, 2025

=== Indoor ===
Event	Performance	Location	Date
800 meters	1:51.69	Blacksburg	February 23, 2002

=== Outdoor ===
Event	Performance	Location	Date
800 meters	1:51.14	Tallahassee	May 11, 2002
400 meters hurdles	50.99	Pomona	May 10, 1986
Discus throw	50.40 m (165 ft 4 1/4 in)	Long Beach	February 17, 1996
Javelin throw	74.94 m (245 ft 10 1/4 in)	Air Force Academy	July 30, 1995

Event	Performance	Location	Date	Points
Decathlon	—N/a	Azusa	April 23–24, 1992	8,705 points
100 meters	10.36 (+0.9 m/s)	Azusa	June 21, 1996	1,008 points
Long jump	7.33 m (24 ft 1/2 in) (+0.0 m/s)	Barcelona	August 5, 1992	893 points
Long jump	7.52 m (24 ft 8 in) (+4.5 m/s)	Azusa	April 23, 1992	—N/a
Shot put	15.28 m (50 ft 1 1/2 in)	Barcelona	August 5, 1993	807 points
High jump	2.04 m (6 ft 8 1/4 in)	Azusa	April 23, 1992	840 points
400 meters	48.19	Azusa	April 23, 1992	900 points
110 meters hurdles	14.17 (+0.3 m/s)	Azusa	April 24, 1992	953 points
Discus throw	49.88 m (163 ft 7 3/4 in)	Azusa	April 24, 1992	868 points
Pole vault	5.28 m (17 ft 3 3/4 in)	Azusa	April 24, 1992	998 points
Javelin throw	68.08 m (223 ft 4 1/4 in)	Tokyo	August 30, 1991	860 points
1500 meters	4:29.38	Azusa	April 24, 1992	749 points
Virtual Best Performance				8,876 points

== Career statistics ==
- PR: 8727 points
- Broke American record
  - 1989: 8549 points
- Olympic bronze medal, 1992
  - 8309 points
- Olympic 9th-place finish, 1988
  - 8180 points
- U.S. national champion
  - 1986: 8203w
  - 1989: 8549
  - 1990: 8600w
  - 1992: 8649
- World University Games champion, 1989
  - 8216 points
- Goodwill Games Gold Medal 1990

== Later life ==
Johnson later retired from competition and became a motivational speaker as he finished a master's degree in Special Education. He also wrote the book "Aim High – An Olympic Decathlete's Inspiring Story" with Verne Becker. Until 2006, Johnson worked at Jefferson High School as a special education instructor and assistant principal in Jefferson, Oregon. He was inducted into the Oregon Sports Hall of Fame in 2005, entering with fellow decathlon competitor Dan O'Brien. He also has a wife and four children. For a couple years in the early 2000s he taught at West Albany High School in Albany, Oregon. Johnson then became the athletic director at South Salem High School to the north in Salem. In June 2009, he was named as the athletic director of Corban University, a small private college in Salem. He resigned from the position in December 2012 to pursue a ministry position with FCA. Johnson accepted a position with the Fellowship of Christian Athletes Oregon in 2013 and is a volunteer and consultant coach with South Salem High School, Corban, Salem Track Club, and Oregon State University.

In June 2017 Johnson and Dan O'Brien were the subjects of (and participants in) the ESPN Radio 30 for 30 podcast "The Trials of Dave and Dan" about the famous ad campaign and its aftermath.
