= PattiSue Plumer =

American track and field athlete

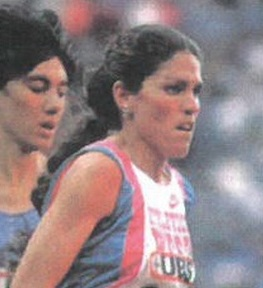

Personal information
- Born: April 27, 1962 (age 64) Covina, California

Sport
- College team: Stanford Cardinal track and field Stanford Law School

Achievements and titles
- Personal bests: 1500 m: 4:03.42 (1992); Mile (Road): 4:16.68 (1990); 2000 m: 5:42.82; 3000 m: 8:40.98 (1992); 5000 m:14:59.99 (1989)
Medal record
Women's athletics
Representing the United States
World Indoor Games
Bronze medal – third place	1985 Paris	3000 m
Goodwill Games
Gold medal – first place	1990 Seattle	3000 m
Bronze medal – third place	1990 Seattle	1500 m
Grand Prix Final
Gold medal – first place	1990 Athens	5000 m
Bronze medal – third place	1989 Fontvieille	3000 m

Patricia Susan "PattiSue" Plumer (born April 27, 1962) is an American former middle-distance and long-distance runner. She is a two-time Olympian, finishing 13th in the 3000-m final in 1988 in Seoul, before going on to finish 10th in the 1500-m final and fifth in the 3000-m final in 1992 in Barcelona. She won the 3000 meters title at the 1990 Goodwill Games. Her 5000-m best of 14:59.99 in 1989 is a former American record.

== Early life ==
Plumer was born in Covina, California. After spending her youth in Newport Beach, California, she moved with her father to Ridgway, Colorado, during junior high school. Her younger sister, Polly Anne Plumer, running in open competition, set the high school mile record at 4:35.24, a mark that lasted for over 30 years. Her senior year, PattiSue took third place in both the mile (5:10A) and the 2-mile (11:20A) at the Colorado State Meet while running for Montrose High School. Next, she went to Stanford University, where she won the 1984 NCAA Women's Outdoor Track and Field Championship at 5000 m in 15:39.38, and the NCAA Women's Indoor Track and Field Championships at two-miles in 1983. She is a nine-time NCAA All-American at Stanford.

== Career ==
Plumer first came to international attention when she won the bronze medal in the 3000 m at the 1985 IAAF World Indoor Games. In 1986, she won the inaugural Carlsbad 5000.

Plumer competed in the 3000 m at the 1988 Seoul Olympics, finishing 13th in the final.

On July 3, 1989, Plumer broke the American record in the 5000-m race, with 14:59.99 at the DN Galan in Stockholm, Sweden, the first woman to break one of Mary Decker's sweep of all distance running American records during the 1980s.

In the 3000-m at the 1989 IAAF World Cup, she fell, but got up to finish third. She won the 1990 Fifth Avenue Mile, setting a course record that stood until 2019, at 4:16.68. She won the 3000-m at the 1990 Goodwill Games, and won the 5000-m at the 1990 IAAF Grand Prix Final.

In 1991, she finished 12th in the 1500-m final at the World Championships. At the 1992 Barcelona Olympics, she finished fifth in the final of the 3000-m, before going on to finish 10th in the 1500-m final.

Plumer's successes were interspersed with injuries and setbacks, including a broken leg after being hit by a taxi in Yokohama, Japan, several bouts with pneumonia, food poisoning at the 1988 Seoul Olympics, and a dog bite at the 1991 World Championships in Tokyo.

== USA National Championships ==
She has won multiple USATF national titles at 3000 m (1989, 1992 Olympic Trials) and 5000 m (1990, 1991), and was a three-time runner-up in the 1500-m contest.

- U.S. Outdoor Champion 3000M: 1989 (9:00.05) and 1992 (8:40.98)
- U.S. Outdoor Champion 5000M: 1990 (15:45.67) and 1991 (16:24.72)

== International competitions ==
Year	Competition	Venue	Position	Event	Notes
Representing United States
1985	World Indoor Games	Paris, France	3rd	3000 m	9:12.12
1986	Goodwill Games	Moscow, Soviet Union	5th	3000 m	8:46.24
1986	Goodwill Games	Moscow, Soviet Union	5th	5000 m	15:20.88
1986	Grand Prix Final	Rome, Italy	5th	5000 m	15:27.70
1988	Olympic Games	Seoul, South Korea	13th	3000 m	8:59.17
1989	Grand Prix Final	Fontvieille, Monaco	3rd	3000 m	9:04.00
1989	World Cup	Barcelona, Spain	3rd	3000 m	8:54.33
1990	Goodwill Games	Seattle, United States	3rd	1500 m	4:10.72
1990	Goodwill Games	Seattle, United States	1st	3000 m	8:51.59
1990	Grand Prix Final	Athens, Greece	1st	5000 m	15:14.36
1991	World Championships	Tokyo, Japan	12th	1500 m	4:06.80
1991	Grand Prix Final	Barcelona, Spain	9th	One mile	4:39.??
1991	Grand Prix Final	Barcelona, Spain	4th	3000 m	8:50.54
1992	Olympic Games	Barcelona, Spain	10th	1500 m	4:03.42
1992	Olympic Games	Barcelona, Spain	5th	3000 m	8:48.29

== Post running career ==
She received her Juris Doctor (J.D.) from Stanford Law School and worked as a lawyer for several years. She now coaches cross-country and track at University of California, Santa Barbara, preceded by a position at University of Texas at Austin, a six year position at Gunn High School in Palo Alto, California, a stint at Stanford, and six years at Los Altos High School (Los Altos, California).

== Mt SAC Hall of Fame ==
Plumer competed for many years at Mt. SAC and captured five titles, winning the 3000 meter event in 1983, 1986 and 1992 and the 5000 meters in 1986 and 1991.

In the 1500 meters, she ran her personal best of 4:03.42 in 1992 and finished 2nd in the Olympic Trials. She went made the final in the Olympic Games in Barcelona and finished 10th and was ranked in the top three in the US at that distance four times, including #1 in 1992. In the 3000 meter event, she was ranked first in the US for 4 consecutive years1989–1992 and competed in two Olympics at this distance, finishing 13th in 1988 in Seoul and 5th in 1992. She was ranked in the top eight in the US nine times at this distance. In the 5000, she was ranked in the top 10 nationally a total of eight times, won an NCAA title while at Stanford and two US national titles. She established the American record of 14:59.99 back in 1989.

== Personal life ==
Her younger sister Polly Plumer, who remained in California, set the national high school record in the mile at 4:35.24 in 1982 while running for University High School (Irvine, California). Plumer married Steven Levere, who she met at Stanford, on December 30, 1989. The two have two children together: Jacqueline and Jennifer.
