= Gary Morgan (race walker) =

American racewalker

Personal information
- Born: January 7, 1960 (age 66) Clarkston, Michigan, U.S.
- Height: 6 ft 2 in (188 cm)
- Weight: 163 lb (74 kg)

Sport
- Sport: Athletics
- Event: Racewalking

Gary F. Morgan (born January 7, 1960) is an American racewalker. He competed in the men's 20 kilometres walk at the 1988 Summer Olympics.
