= Diana Orrange =

American triple jumper

Personal information
- Nationality: American
- Born: August 9, 1967 (age 58) Orange, Texas

Sport
- Sport: Athletics
- Event: Triple jump

Elexa Diana Orrange (née Wills; born August 9, 1967) is an American athlete. She competed in the women's triple jump at the 1996 Summer Olympics.
