= Terrance Herrington =

American middle-distance runner

Personal information
- Born: July 31, 1966 (age 60) Hartsville, South Carolina, U.S.
- Education: Clemson University
- Height: 5 ft 10.5 in (179 cm)
- Weight: 137 lb (62 kg)

Sport
- Sport: Athletics
- Event: 1500 m
- College team: Clemson Tigers
Medal record
Men's Athletics
Representing the United States
Pan American Games
Silver medal – second place	1995 Mar del Plata	1500 m

Terrance Jerome Herrington (born July 31, 1966) is an American retired middle-distance runner who specialized in the 1500 meters. He represented his country at the 1992 Summer Olympics as well as three consecutive World Championships. Following his track career, Terrance became a certified basketball referee, and officiated many High School Varsity contests as well as recreation games in the Tidewater area.

== Competition record ==
Year	Competition	Venue	Position	Event	Notes
Representing the United States
1989	Universiade	Duisburg, West Germany	12th (h)	1500 m	3:46.27
1989	World Cup	Barcelona, Spain	7th	1500 m	3:40.88
1991	World Indoor Championships	Seville, Spain	9th	1500 m	3:47.19
1991	World Championships	Tokyo, Japan	34th (h)	1500 m	3:47.28
1992	Olympic Games	Barcelona, Spain	30th (h)	1500 m	3:44.80
1993	World Championships	Stuttgart, Germany	25th (sf)	1500 m	3:46.64
1995	Pan American Games	Buenos Aires, Argentina	2nd	1500 m	3:40.97
1995	World Championships	Gothenburg, Sweden	17th (sf)	1500 m	3:39.96

== Personal bests ==
Outdoor

- 800 meters – 1:46.12 (Borlänge 1995)
- 1500 meters – 3:35.77 (Monaco 1991)
- One mile – 3:53.64 (Eugene 1995)
- 3000 meters – 8:10.88 (New York 1995)

Indoor

- 1500 meters – 3:41.98 (Birmingham 1993)
- One mile – 3:56.89 (Fairfax 1995)
