= Donna Mayhew =

American javelin thrower (born 1960)

Personal information
- Born: 20 June 1960 (age 66) Dupont, Pennsylvania, United States

Sport
- Sport: Track and field
Medal record
Representing United States
Pan American Games
Silver medal – second place	1991 Havana	Javelin throw

Donna Lee Mayhew (born June 20, 1960) is a retired female javelin thrower from the United States, who twice represented her native country at the Summer Olympics: 1988 and 1992. She set her personal best (63.66 metres) in 1988.

== Biography ==
From 1978 to 1990, Mayhew attended Glendale Community College in Glendale, California, where she competed in javelin throwing as a member of the college's track and field team. In 1980, she competed in the U.S. junior college championships and placed second.

Mayhew then attended the University of Arizona, where she also competed in javelin throwing as a member of the university's track and field team during the 1980s. In 1983, she placed third in the NCAA Meet. Following her 1985 graduation from the university, she became a five-time champion in javelin at the U.S. National Women's Track and Field Championships in 1988 and from 1992 to 1995. In 1988 and 1992, she won the U.S. Olympic Track and Field Trial's in the women's javelin category. She went on to finish seventh at the Olympics in 1988 and twelfth in 1992. After placing sixth in the 1989 World Cup, she earned a silver medal at the 1991 Pan American Games.

== International competitions ==
Year	Competition	Venue	Position	Notes
Representing the United States
1988	Olympic Games	Seoul, South Korea	7th	61.78 m
1991	Pan American Games	Havana, Cuba	2nd	58.44 m
1991	World Championships	Tokyo, Japan	22nd	56.34 m
1992	Olympic Games	Barcelona, Spain	12th	55.68 m
