= 1991 UK Athletics Championships =

British athletics event

- Dates: 8 & 9 June 1991
- Host city: Cardiff, Wales
- Venue: Cardiff Athletics Stadium
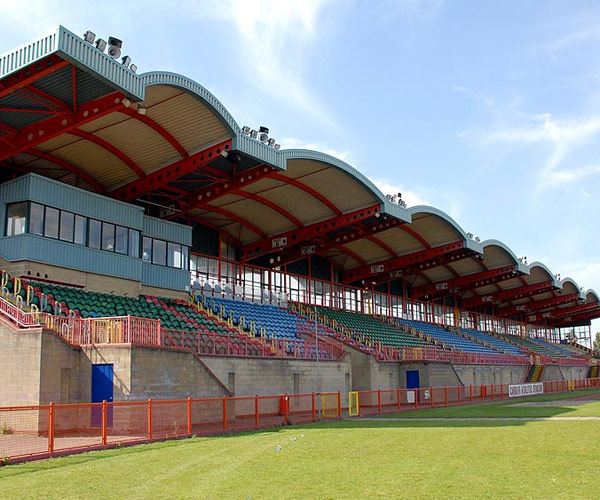
- Level: Senior
- Type: Outdoor

The 1991 UK Athletics Championships sponsored by Pearl Assurance, was the national championship in outdoor track and field for the United Kingdom held at Cardiff Athletics Stadium, Cardiff. It was the second time that the event was held in the Welsh capital, following on from the 1990 championships there.

It was the fifteenth edition of the competition limited to British athletes only, launched as an alternative to the AAA Championships, which was open to foreign competitors. However, because the calibre of national competition remained greater at the AAA event, the UK Championships this year were not considered the principal national championship event by some statisticians, such as the National Union of Track Statisticians (NUTS). Many of the athletes below also competed at the 1991 AAA Championships.

== Summary ==
Strong winds affected several of the jumps on the programme. A women's hammer throw was added to the schedule for the first time, though it was not classified as a UK championship event at the competition.

Three athletes won a third straight UK title, all of them throwers: Paul Head (hammer), Sharon Gibson (javelin) and Jackie McKernan (discus). Five further athletes defended their 1990 titles: Linford Christie (100 m), David Sharpe (800 m), Paul Edwards (shot put), Andy Ashurst (pole vault) and Alison Wyeth (1500 m). Judy Oakes returned to the top of the women's shot put podium to take a record-breaking ninth UK title. No athlete won multiple UK titles, though Michael Rosswess managed runner-up in both short sprints.

The main international track and field competition for the United Kingdom that year was the 1991 World Championships in Athletics. Liz McColgan added the world 10,000 metres title to her UK 3000 m title. Though neither Roger Black nor Kriss Akabusi topped the UK podium, they won medals at the world level that year.

== Medals ==
=== Men ===
Event	Gold		Silver		Bronze	
100m	Linford Christie	10.39	Michael Rosswess	10.47	Jason John	10.57
200m	John Regis	21.24	Michael Rosswess	21.28	Roger Black	21.55
400m	Paul Sanders	47.69	Kriss Akabusi	47.81	Mark Richardson	47.97
800m	David Sharpe	1:50.31	Steve Heard	1:50.79	Andrew Lill	1:51.07
1,500m	Simon Fairbrother	3:48.59	Gary Marlow	3:50.26	Nick Hopkins	3:50.37
3,000m	Peter Elliott	8:07.51	Neil Rimmer	8:10.70	Andrew Geddes	8:11.73
5,000m	Ian Hamer	13:49.86	Colin Walker	13:50.93	Simon Mugglestone	13:51.74
110m hurdles	David Nelson	13.88	Andrew Tulloch	13.90	Hughie Teape	13.96
400m hurdles	Max Robertson	50.33	Lawrence Lynch	50.81	(Scotland) Mark Davidson	51.67
3000m steeplechase	Peter McColgan	8:49.54	Mick Hawkins	8:53.15	Spencer Duval	8:55.78
10,000m walk	Steve Partington	42:46.28	Gareth Holloway	43:17.85	Les Morton	43:41.07
high jump	Dalton Grant	2.20 m	(Scotland) Geoff Parsons	2.15 m	Marlon Huggins	2.10 m
pole vault	Andy Ashurst	5.15 m	Matt Belsham	5.10 m	Keith Stock	5.00 m
long jump	Mark Forsythe	7.81 m w	John King	7.81 m w	Barrington Williams	7.80 m w
triple jump	Vernon Samuels	16.19 m	Francis Agyepong	15.88 m	Michael McDonald	15.56 m
shot put	(Wales) Paul Edwards	18.68 m	Matt Simson	18.37 m	Nigel Spratley	16.99 m
discus throw	Paul Mardle	54.66 m	Kevin Brown	54.46 m	(Scotland) Darrin Morris	52.82 m
hammer throw	Paul Head	73.64 m	Mick Jones	67.24 m	Shane Peacock	66.24 m
javelin throw	Gary Jenson	76.90 m	Mark Roberson	75.86 m	Myles Cottrell	72.82 m

=== Women ===
Event	Gold		Silver		Bronze	
100m	Beverly Kinch	11.63	Paula Thomas	11.67	Stephi Douglas	11.71
200m	Linda Keough	24.25	Sally Gunnell	24.26	Simmone Jacobs	24.40
400m	Sandra Leigh	53.55	Tracy Goddard	53.59	Jennifer Stoute	53.96
800m	Paula Fryer	2:05.43	Mary Kitson	2:06.18	Alison Parry	2:07.52
1,500m	Alison Wyeth	4:14.98	Lisa York	4:15.21	Lorraine Baker	4:16.24
3,000m	(Scotland) Liz McColgan	8:59.39	Jill Hunter	9:05.90	Karen Hutcheson	9:11.56
100m hurdles	Lesley-Ann Skeete	13.66	Louise Fraser	13.85	Michelle Edwards	13.98
400m hurdles	Jacqui Parker	57.64	Sarah Dean	59.20	Jennie Pearson	59.99
5000m walk	Vicky Lupton	22:51.38	Helen Elleker	23:26.18	Sylvia Black	23:44.88
high jump	Lea Haggett	1.85 m	Debbie Marti	1.85 m	(Northern Ireland) Janet Boyle	1.80 m
long jump	Fiona May	6.74 m w	Oluyinka Idowu	6.69 m w	Mary Berkeley	6.54 m w
triple jump	Evette Finikin	13.23 m w	Michelle Griffith	13.17 m w	Mary Berkeley	12.97 m w
shot put	Judy Oakes	18.37 m	Myrtle Augee	18.12 m	Maggie Lynes	15.71 m
discus throw	(Northern Ireland) Jackie McKernan	53.14 m	Janette Picton	50.64 m	Debbie Bushnell	47.76 m
hammer throw	Fiona Whitehead	45.94 m	Jean Clark	44.62 m	Diana Holden	42.12 m
javelin throw	Sharon Gibson	60.14 m	Caroline White	56.50 m	Tessa Sanderson	55.50 m
