= Athletics at the 1987 Summer Universiade – Women's 800 metres =

The women's 800 metres event at the 1987 Summer Universiade was held at the Stadion Maksimir in Zagreb on 15, 17 and 19 July 1987.

== Medalists ==
Gold	Silver	Bronze
Slobodanka Čolović; Yugoslavia	Mitica Junghiatu; Romania	Joetta Clark; United States

== Results ==
=== Heats ===
Rank	Heat	Athlete	Nationality	Time	Notes
1	2	Joetta Clark	United States	2:02.45	Q
2	2	Yelena Zavadskaya	Soviet Union	2:02.54	Q
3	2	Renée Belanger	Canada	2:02.58	Q
4	2	Anna Rybicka	Poland	2:02.73	q
5	3	Slobodanka Čolović	Yugoslavia	2:02.81	Q
6	3	Gabriela Lesch	West Germany	2:03.63	Q
7	3	Zofia Wieciorkowska	Poland	2:03.71	Q
8	1	Gabriela Sedláková	Czechoslovakia	2:04.32	Q
9	1	Anne Purvis	Great Britain	2:04.48	Q
10	1	Mitica Junghiatu	Romania	2:04.70	Q
11	2	Rita Csordós	Hungary	2:05.08	q
12	3	Nicoleta Tozzi	Italy	2:05.21	q
13	1	Célestine N'Drin	Ivory Coast	2:05.56	q
14	4	Julie Jenkins	United States	2:06.47	Q
15	4	Vesna Bajer	Yugoslavia	2:06.47	Q
16	4	Christine Wynn	Canada	2:06.79	Q
17	4	Sarah Collins	Australia	2:07.18	
18	3	Letica Gracia	Mexico	2:07.95	
19	1	Elizabeth Casillas	Puerto Rico	2:12.58	
20	3	Sheilla George	Puerto Rico	2:17.34	
21	1	Muaka Nlandu	Zaire	2:58.40	
	2	Magda Maiocchi	Italy	DNF	
	4	Mina Zeina	Lebanon	DNF	

=== Semifinals ===
Rank	Heat	Athlete	Nationality	Time	Notes
1	2	Slobodanka Čolović	Yugoslavia	2:01.13	Q
2	2	Gabriela Lesch	West Germany	2:02.13	Q
3	1	Joetta Clark	United States	2:02.23	Q
4	1	Mitica Junghiatu	Romania	2:02.33	Q
5	2	Julie Jenkins	United States	2:02.37	Q
6	2	Renée Belanger	Canada	2:02.55	q
7	1	Gabriela Sedláková	Czechoslovakia	2:02.58	Q
8	1	Yelena Zavadskaya	Soviet Union	2:02.70	q
9	2	Anne Purvis	Great Britain	2:02.73	
10	1	Zofia Wieciorkowska	Poland	2:03.07	
11	1	Vesna Bajer	Yugoslavia	2:03.90	
12	2	Anna Rybicka	Poland	2:04.09	
13	1	Célestine N'Drin	Ivory Coast	2:04.70	
14	2	Nicoletta Tozzi	Italy	2:04.78	
15	2	Rita Csordós	Hungary	2:07.30	
	1	Christine Wynn	Canada	?	

=== Final ===
Rank	Athlete	Nationality	Time	Notes
1st place, gold medalist(s)	Slobodanka Čolović	Yugoslavia	1:56.88	UR
2nd place, silver medalist(s)	Mitica Junghiatu	Romania	1:59.28	
3rd place, bronze medalist(s)	Joetta Clark	United States	1:59.92	
4	Julie Jenkins	United States	2:01.07	
5	Gabriela Sedláková	Czechoslovakia	2:02.28	
6	Gabriela Lesch	West Germany	2:02.45	
7	Renée Belanger	Canada	2:03.31	
8	Yelena Zavadskaya	Soviet Union	2:07.18	
