= Helen Thorpe (athlete) =

British athlete (born 1963)

Helen Daniel née Thorpe
Personal information
- Nationality: British (English)
- Born: 24 October 1963 (age 61) Wortley, West Riding of Yorkshire, England

Sport
- Sport: Athletics
- Event: middle distance
- Club: Cambridge Harriers AC; Ashford AC

Helen Daniel (née Thorpe, born 24 October 1963) is an English former athlete who competed mainly in the 800 metres. She won the 800m title at the 1990 UK Championships, and finished third at the AAA Championships in 1986, 1987 and 1988. Her 800m lifetime best of 2:01.86 was set on 10 July 1987 in London.

== Biography ==
A member of Cambridge Harriers AC, Thorpe finished second at the 1986 AAA Indoor Championships behind Kirsty Wade, second at the 1986 UK Championships in a then personal best of 2:02.02 behind Anne Purvis, and third at the 1986 WAAA Championships in 2:05.14 behind Diane Edwards and Lorraine Baker, before going on to represent England in the 800 metres event at the 1986 Commonwealth Games in Edinburgh, Scotland, where she was eliminated in the heats running a time of 2:05.61.

Thorpe achieved her lifetime best of 2:01.86 at the 1987 London grand prix event on 10 July at the Crystal Palace, and finished third at the 1987 AAA Championships behind Edwards and Purvis in 2:04.61. At the 1988 AAA Championships/Olympic trials, she finished third in 2:03.06 behind Kirsty Wade and Shireen Bailey. She went on to reach the semifinals at the 1990 European Indoor Championships and to win the 800m title at the 1990 UK Championships in 2:05.52, ahead of Lorraine Baker

Competing as Helen Daniel, she finished second at the AAA Indoor Championships in 1991 (behind Paula Fryer) and 1992 (behind Dawn Gandy), and finished fourth at the 1994 AAA Championships.

== Competition record ==
Year	Competition	Venue	Position	Notes
Representing England
1986	Commonwealth Games	Edinburgh, Scotland	10th (h)	2:05.61
Representing Great Britain
1990	European Indoor Championships	Glasgow, Scotland	10th (sf)	2:07.08
National Championships
1986	AAA Indoor Championships	RAF Cosford, England	2nd	2:05.22
1986	UK Championships	Cwmbran, Wales	2nd	2:02.02
1986	AAA Championships	Birmingham, England	3rd	2:05.14
1987	UK Championships	Derby, England	6th	2:04.34
1987	AAA Championships	Birmingham, England	3rd	2:04.61
1988	AAA Championships	Birmingham, England	3rd	2:03.06
1990	UK Championships	Cardiff, Wales	1st	2:05.52
1991	AAA Indoor Championships	RAF Cosford, England	2nd	2:09.59
1992	AAA Indoor Championships	RAF Cosford, England	2nd	2:07.93
1992	AAA Championships	Birmingham, England	8th	2:05.79
1994	AAA Championships	Sheffield, England	4th	2:??.??
(#) Indicates overall position in qualifying heats (h) or semifinals (sf)
