= 1988 European Athletics Indoor Championships – Women's 800 metres =

The women's 800 metres event at the 1988 European Athletics Indoor Championships was held on 5 and 6 March.

== Medalists ==
Gold	Silver	Bronze
Sabine Zwiener; West Germany	Olga Nelyubova; Soviet Union	Gabi Lesch; West Germany

== Results ==
=== Heats ===
First 2 from each heat (Q) and the next 4 fastest (q) qualified for the semifinals.

Rank	Heat	Name	Nationality	Time	Notes
1	3	Olga Nelyubova	Soviet Union	2:04.95	Q
2	3	Gabriela Sedláková	Czechoslovakia	2:05.50	Q
3	3	Rosa-María Colorado	Spain	2:05.51	q
4	2	Montserrat Pujol	Spain	2:05.61	Q
5	4	Gabi Lesch	West Germany	2:05.88	Q
6	4	Mónika Balint	Hungary	2:06.04	Q
7	4	Janet Bell	Great Britain	2:06.08	q
8	2	Dawn Gandy	Great Britain	2:06.38	Q
9	4	Desireé de Leeuw	Netherlands	2:07.16	q
10	1	Sabine Zwiener	West Germany	2:07.26	Q
11	2	Giuseppina Cirulli	Italy	2:07.47	q
12	1	Slobodanka Čolović	Yugoslavia	2:07.48	Q
13	3	Nicoleta Tozzi	Italy	2:07.64	
14	1	Yvonne van der Kolk	Netherlands	2:07.66	
15	1	Anushka Dimitrova	Bulgaria	2:07.69	
16	1	Erika Rossi	Italy	2:10.99	

=== Semifinals ===
First 3 from each semifinal qualified directly (Q) for the final.

Rank	Heat	Name	Nationality	Time	Notes
1	2	Sabine Zwiener	West Germany	2:03.20	Q
2	2	Gabriela Sedláková	Czechoslovakia	2:03.40	Q
3	1	Olga Nelyubova	Soviet Union	2:03.93	Q
4	1	Gabi Lesch	West Germany	2:04.02	Q
5	2	Janet Bell	Great Britain	2:04.28	Q
6	1	Slobodanka Čolović	Yugoslavia	2:04.35	Q
7	1	Montserrat Pujol	Spain	2:04.49	
8	1	Dawn Gandy	Great Britain	2:04.50	
8	2	Rosa-María Colorado	Spain	2:04.50	
10	2	Giuseppina Cirulli	Italy	2:04.95	
11	2	Mónika Balint	Hungary	2:05.12	
12	1	Desireé de Leeuw	Netherlands	2:08.96	

=== Final ===
Rank	Name	Nationality	Time	Notes
1st place, gold medalist(s)	Sabine Zwiener	West Germany	2:01.19	PB
2nd place, silver medalist(s)	Olga Nelyubova	Soviet Union	2:01.61	
3rd place, bronze medalist(s)	Gabi Lesch	West Germany	2:01.85	
4	Slobodanka Čolović	Yugoslavia	2:02.34	
5	Janet Bell	Great Britain	2:02.70	
6	Gabriela Sedláková	Czechoslovakia	2:05.59	
