= 1989 European Athletics Indoor Championships – Women's 800 metres =

The women's 800 metres event at the 1989 European Athletics Indoor Championships was held on 18 and 19 February.

== Medalists ==
Gold	Silver	Bronze
Doina Melinte; Romania	Ellen Kiessling; East Germany	Tatyana Grebenchuk; Soviet Union

== Results ==
=== Heats ===
First 2 from each heat (Q) and the next 2 fastest (q) qualified for the final.

Rank	Heat	Name	Nationality	Time	Notes
1	1	Doina Melinte	Romania	2:01.76	Q
2	1	Tatyana Grebenchuk	Soviet Union	2:02.10	Q
3	1	Mayte Zúñiga	Spain	2:02.25	q
4	1	Ellen Kiessling	East Germany	2:02.36	q
5	2	Svetlana Kitova	Soviet Union	2:04.18	Q
6	2	Gabi Lesch	West Germany	2:04.20	Q
7	1	Aisling Molloy	Ireland	2:05.44	
8	2	Karolina Szabó	Hungary	2:05.67	
9	1	Anneke Matthys	Belgium	2:06.50	
10	2	Julia Merino	Spain	2:07.23	
11	2	Regine Berg	Belgium	2:15.31	

=== Final ===
Rank	Name	Nationality	Time	Notes
1st place, gold medalist(s)	Doina Melinte	Romania	1:59.89	
2nd place, silver medalist(s)	Ellen Kiessling	East Germany	2:01.24	
3rd place, bronze medalist(s)	Tatyana Grebenchuk	Soviet Union	2:01.63	
4	Mayte Zúñiga	Spain	2:02.77	
5	Gabi Lesch	West Germany	2:03.04	
	Svetlana Kitova	Soviet Union	DNF	
