= Athletics at the 1985 Summer Universiade – Women's 800 metres =

The women's 800 metres event at the 1985 Summer Universiade was held at the Kobe Universiade Memorial Stadium in Kobe on 2 and 3 September 1985.

== Medalists ==
Gold	Silver	Bronze
Nadezhda Zvyagintseva; Soviet Union	Cristieana Cojocaru; Romania	Ana Fidelia Quirot; Cuba

== Results ==
=== Heats ===
Rank	Heat	Athlete	Nationality	Time	Notes
1	1	Cristieana Cojocaru	Romania	2:01.81	Q
2	1	Ana Fidelia Quirot	Cuba	2:02.20	Q
3	1	Svetlana Kitova	Soviet Union	2:02.79	q
4	1	Slobodanka Čolović	Yugoslavia	2:02.88	q
5	1	Gabi Lesch	West Germany	2:04.11	
6	1	C. Nalikka	Uganda	2:21.01	
1	2	Nadezhda Zvyagintseva	Soviet Union	2:07.32	Q
2	2	Joetta Clark	United States	2:08.21	Q
3	2	Toshimi Tsuganezawa	Japan	2:13.74	
1	3	Ella Kovacs	Romania	2:03.57?	Q
2	3	Fatima Aouam	Morocco	2:02.88?	Q
3	3	Vesna Bajer	Yugoslavia	2:03.77	
4	3	Camille Cato	Canada	2:04.45	
5	3	Veronica McIntosh	United States	2:05.81	
6	3	Nathalie Thoumas	France	2:06.30	

=== Final ===
Rank	Athlete	Nationality	Time	Notes
1st place, gold medalist(s)	Nadezhda Zvyagintseva	Soviet Union	1:58.59	
2nd place, silver medalist(s)	Cristieana Cojocaru	Romania	1:59.09	
3rd place, bronze medalist(s)	Ana Fidelia Quirot	Cuba	1:59.77	
4	Svetlana Kitova	Soviet Union	2:00.31	
5	Ella Kovacs	Romania	2:02.01	
6	Joetta Clark	United States	2:02.20	
7	Fatima Aouam	Morocco	2:02.86	
8	Slobodanka Čolović	Yugoslavia	2:03.51	
