= Athletics at the 1982 Commonwealth Games – Women's 800 metres =

Women's 800 metres at the Commonwealth Games

The women's 800 metres event at the 1982 Commonwealth Games was held on 5 and 7 October at the QE II Stadium in Brisbane, Australia.

== Medalists ==
Gold	Silver	Bronze
Kirsty McDermott; Wales	Anne Clarkson; Scotland	Heather Barralet; Australia

== Results ==
=== Heats ===
Qualification: First 4 in each heat (Q) and the next 1 fastest (q) qualify for the final.

Rank	Heat	Name	Nationality	Time	Notes
1	1	Anne Clarkson	Scotland	2:04.06	Q
2	1	Lorraine Baker	England	2:04.11	Q
3	1	Terri-Anne Cater	Australia	2:05.17	Q
4	1	Evelyn Adiru	Uganda	2:05.39	Q
5	2	Shireen Hassan	England	2:05.51	Q
6	2	Kirsty McDermott	Wales	2:05.91	Q
7	1	Francine Gendron	Canada	2:06.23	q
8	2	Christine Hughes	New Zealand	2:06.52	Q
9	2	Heather Barralet	Australia	2:06.97	Q
9	2	Carol Lightfoot	Scotland	2:09.66	
10	1	Cathy Rattray	Jamaica	2:10.22	
11	1	Hildah Musopa	Zambia	2:10.41	
12	2	Clara Bwalei	Kenya	2:10.57	
13	2	Salitia Muga	Papua New Guinea	2:16.27	
	1	Agnes Fwamba	Kenya	DNF	
	2	Mary Chepkemboi	Kenya	DNS	

=== Final ===
Rank	Name	Nationality	Time	Notes
1st place, gold medalist(s)	Kirsty McDermott	Wales	2:01.31	
2nd place, silver medalist(s)	Anne Clarkson	Scotland	2:01.52	
3rd place, bronze medalist(s)	Heather Barralet	Australia	2:01.70	
4	Terri-Anne Cater	Australia	2:01.91	
5	Shireen Hassan	England	2:02.21	
6	Lorraine Baker	England	2:03.17	
7	Christine Hughes	New Zealand	2:04.87	
8	Francine Gendron	Canada	2:06.21	
9	Evelyn Adiru	Uganda	2:06.23	
