= Athletics at the 1986 Commonwealth Games – Women's 800 metres =

Women's 800 metres at the Commonwealth Games

The women's 800 metres event at the 1986 Commonwealth Games was held on 28 and 31 July at the Meadowbank Stadium in Edinburgh.

== Medalists ==
Gold	Silver	Bronze
Kirsty Wade; Wales	Diane Edwards; England	Lorraine Baker; England

== Results ==
=== Heats ===
Qualification: First 4 of each heat (Q) and the next 4 fastest (q) qualified for the final.

Rank	Heat	Name	Nationality	Time	Notes
1	1	Anne Purvis	Scotland	2:02.47	Q
2	1	Lorraine Baker	England	2:03.24	Q
3	1	Renée Belanger	Canada	2:03.46	Q
4	1	Julie Schwass	Australia	2:03.88	q
5	2	Kirsty Wade	Wales	2:03.94	Q
6	2	Diane Edwards	England	2:04.05	Q
7	1	Camille Cato	Canada	2:04.08	q
8	2	Brit McRoberts	Canada	2:04.33	Q
9	2	Elizabeth MacArthur	Scotland	2:04.40	
10	2	Helen Thorpe	England	2:05.61	
11	1	Puseletso Monkoe	Lesotho	2:18.53	
	2	Lieketseng Mpopelle	Lesotho	DQ	

=== Final ===
Rank	Name	Nationality	Time	Notes
1st place, gold medalist(s)	Kirsty Wade	Wales	2:00.94	
2nd place, silver medalist(s)	Diane Edwards	England	2:01.12	
3rd place, bronze medalist(s)	Lorraine Baker	England	2:01.79	
4	Anne Purvis	Scotland	2:02.17	
5	Camille Cato	Canada	2:03.26	
6	Renée Belanger	Canada	2:03.85	
7	Brit McRoberts	Canada	2:05.10	
8	Julie Schwass	Australia	2:05.14	
