= 1989 IAAF World Indoor Championships – Women's 800 metres =

The women's 800 metres event at the 1989 IAAF World Indoor Championships was held at the Budapest Sportcsarnok in Budapest on March 4 and 5.

== Medalists ==
Gold	Silver	Bronze
Christine Wachtel; East Germany	Tatyana Grebenchuk; Soviet Union	Ellen Kiessling; East Germany

== Results ==
=== Heats ===
First 2 of each heat (Q) and next 2 fastest (q) qualified for the final.

Rank	Heat	Name	Nationality	Time	Notes
1	2	Ellen Kiessling	East Germany	2:01.74	Q
2	2	Violeta Beclea	Romania	2:01.88	Q
3	2	Joetta Clark	United States	2:01.96	q
4	2	Gabriela Lesch	West Germany	2:02.20	q
5	1	Christine Wachtel	East Germany	2:02.29	Q
6	1	Tatyana Grebenchuk	Soviet Union	2:02.35	Q
7	1	Tudorita Chidu	Romania	2:02.85	
8	2	Erzsébet Szabó	Hungary	2:03.37	=NR
9	1	Maite Zúñiga	Spain	2:03.65	
10	1	Alisa Harvey	United States	2:04.03	
11	2	Marcia Tate	Jamaica	2:05.28	

=== Final ===
Rank	Name	Nationality	Time	Notes
1st place, gold medalist(s)	Christine Wachtel	East Germany	1:59.24	CR
2nd place, silver medalist(s)	Tatyana Grebenchuk	Soviet Union	1:59.53	PB
3rd place, bronze medalist(s)	Ellen Kiessling	East Germany	1:59.68	PB
4	Violeta Beclea	Romania	2:00.26	PB
5	Gabriela Lesch	West Germany	2:01.09	
	Joetta Clark	United States	DNS	
