= 1990 European Athletics Indoor Championships – Women's 800 metres =

The women's 800 metres event at the 1990 European Athletics Indoor Championships was held in Kelvin Hall on 3 and 4 March.

== Medalists ==
Gold	Silver	Bronze
Lyubov Gurina; Soviet Union	Sabine Zwiener; West Germany	Lorraine Baker; Great Britain

== Results ==
=== Heats ===
First 3 from each heat (Q) and the next 2 fastest (q) qualified for the semifinals.

Rank	Heat	Name	Nationality	Time	Notes
1	2	Gabi Lesch	West Germany	2:05.67	Q
2	2	Lyubov Gurina	Soviet Union	2:05.76	Q
3	2	Aisling Molloy	Ireland	2:05.90	Q
4	3	Tudorita Chidu	Romania	2:06.15	Q
5	3	Sabine Zwiener	West Germany	2:06.71	Q
6	3	Dawn Gandy	Great Britain	2:07.30	Q
7	3	Rossana Morabito	Italy	2:07.30	q
8	2	Helen Thorpe	Great Britain	2:08.18	q
9	1	Ellen Kießling	East Germany	2:09.59	Q
10	1	Lorraine Baker	Great Britain	2:10.19	Q
11	1	Mayte Zúñiga	Spain	2:10.40	Q
12	1	Inna Yevseyeva	Soviet Union	2:10.43	
13	1	Elsa Amaral	Portugal	2:11.66	
	2	Theresia Kiesl	Austria	DQ	

=== Semifinals ===
First 2 from each semifinal (Q) and the next 2 fastest (q) qualified for the final.

Rank	Heat	Name	Nationality	Time	Notes
1	1	Sabine Zwiener	West Germany	2:03.62	Q
2	2	Tudorita Chidu	Romania	2:03.72	Q
3	1	Lorraine Baker	Great Britain	2:03.78	Q
4	2	Lyubov Gurina	Soviet Union	2:03.82	Q
5	2	Ellen Kießling	East Germany	2:04.07	q
6	1	Aisling Molloy	Ireland	2:04.21	q
7	1	Gabi Lesch	West Germany	2:04.79	
8	2	Mayte Zúñiga	Spain	2:05.26	
9	2	Dawn Gandy	Great Britain	2:05.44	
10	2	Helen Thorpe	Great Britain	2:07.08	
11	1	Rossana Morabito	Italy	2:07.18	

=== Final ===
Rank	Name	Nationality	Time	Notes
1st place, gold medalist(s)	Lyubov Gurina	Soviet Union	2:01.63	
2nd place, silver medalist(s)	Sabine Zwiener	West Germany	2:02.23	
3rd place, bronze medalist(s)	Lorraine Baker	Great Britain	2:02.42	
4	Ellen Kießling	East Germany	2:02.58	
5	Tudorita Chidu	Romania	2:02.88	
6	Aisling Molloy	Ireland	2:05.98	
