= 1991 AAA Championships =

- Dates: 26–27 July
- Host city: Birmingham, England
- Venue: Alexander Stadium
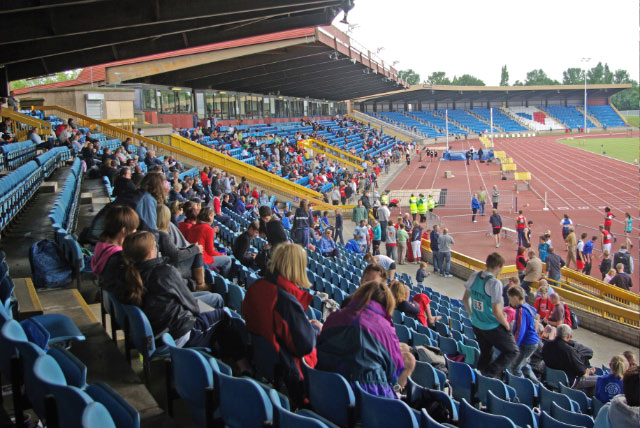
- Level: Senior
- Type: Outdoor

The 1991 AAA Championships sponsored by Panasonic, were an outdoor track and field competition organised by the Amateur Athletic Association (AAA), held from 26 to 27 July at Alexander Stadium in Birmingham, England. It was considered the de facto national championships for the United Kingdom, ahead of the 1991 UK Athletics Championships.

== Medal summary ==
=== Men ===
Event	Gold		Silver		Bronze	
100m	Linford Christie	10.14	John Regis	10.22	Michael Rosswess	10.25
200m	(United States) Jon Drummond	20.61	Michael Rosswess	20.64	(United States) James Trapp	20.70
400m	Derek Redmond	46.07	Mark Richardson	46.08	Ade Mafe	46.09
800m	(Scotland) Tom McKean	1:45.67	Steve Heard	1:46.53	(Scotland) Brian Whittle	1:46.63
1,500m	Matthew Yates	3:40.88	Kevin McKay	3:41.25	Tony Morrell	3:41.53
3,000m	(Scotland) Tom Hanlon	8:02.11	(Republic of Ireland) John Downes	8:05.12	Paul Dugdale	8:05.74
5,000m	Eamonn Martin	13:32.99	Robert Denmark	13:33.03	(Wales) Ian Hamer	13:33.66
10,000m	Carl Thackery	28:37.52	Richard Nerurkar	28:39.58	Jon Solly	28:45.28
110m hurdles	David Nelson	13.55	Hughie Teape	13.61	(Wales) Nigel Walker	13.64
400m hurdles	Max Robertson	49.98	Lawrence Lynch	50.19	(Australia) Leigh Miller	50.32
3000m steeplechase	Colin Walker	8:38.02	Ken Penney	8:44.01	(Northern Ireland) Peter McColgan	8:44.71
10,000m walk	Ian McCombie	41:24.69	Andrew Penn	41:59.10	Paul Blagg	42:47.16
high jump	(United States) Hollis Conway	2.31 m	(Scotland) Geoff Parsons	2.28 m	Dalton Grant	2.25 m
pole vault	(United States) Tim Bright	5.50 m	(Italy) Gianni Iapichino	5.40 m	Mike Edwards	5.30 m
long jump	Barrington Williams	7.94 m	Steve Phillips	7.81 m	(United States) Joe Greene	7.79 m
triple jump	(United States) Willie Banks	16.60 m	Jonathan Edwards	16.50 m	Vernon Samuels	16.39 m
shot put	(Wales) Paul Edwards	18.92 m	Matt Simson	18.41 m	Shaun Pickering	17.09 m
discus throw	(Australia) Werner Reiterer	59.56 m	Simon Williams	58.08 m	(Republic of Ireland) Nick Sweeney	57.92 m
hammer throw	(Australia) Sean Carlin	72.58 m	Mick Jones	66.72 m	(Republic of Ireland) Conor McCullough	66.48 m
javelin throw	Mick Hill	84.54 m	Roald Bradstock	80.48 m	Colin Mackenzie	80.22 m
decathlon	Eric Hollingsworth	7631 pts	(Australia) Dean Smith	7522 pts	Mark Bishop	7364 pts

=== Women ===
Event	Gold		Silver		Bronze	
100m	(United States) Evelyn Ashford	11.15	(Australia) Kerry Johnson	11.38	Stephi Douglas	11.44
200m	Stephi Douglas	23.37	Katharine Merry	23.50	(Wales) Sallyanne Short	23.60
400m	(United States) Maicel Malone	50.89	Lorraine Hanson	51.88	Jennifer Stoute	52.60
800m	Paula Fryer	2:02.19	Lorraine Baker	2:02.76	(Scotland) Sue Bevan	2:03.15
1,500m	Ann Williams	4:08.93	Christina Cahill	4:11.31	(Scotland) Karen Hutcheson	4:15.35
3,000m	(Scotland) Yvonne Murray	8:46.47	Alison Wyeth	8:54.34	Andrea Whitcombe	8:58.59
5,000m	Amanda Wright	16:50.62	Alison Barnes	16:59.67	Sally Lynch	17:07.32
10,000m	(Socialist Federal Republic of Yugoslavia) Silva Vivod	33:04.60	(New Zealand) Lesley Morton	33:23.66	(Scotland) Annette Bell	33:46.62
100m hurdles	Sally Gunnell	13.02	Lesley-Ann Skeete	13.05	(Wales) Kay Morley-Brown	13.17
400m hurdles	Gowry Retchakan	55.67	Jacqui Parker	56.15	Sarah Dean	57.38
5,000m walk	Betty Sworowski	22:29.04	Helen Elleker	23:27.70	Melanie Brookes	24:38.90
10,000m walk	Betty Sworowski	46:23.08	Melanie Brookes	50:10.85	Only two finishers	
high jump	Debbie Marti	1.88 m	(Northern Ireland) Janet Boyle Lea Haggett (Australia) Alison Inverarity	1.88 m	Not awarded	
long jump	Fiona May	6.58 m	Yinka Idowu	6.50 m	Mary Berkeley	6.36 m
triple jump	Evette Finikin	13.46 m	Rachel Kirby	13.16 m	(Scotland) Karen Hambrook	12.77 m
shot put	Judy Oakes	18.24 m	Myrtle Augee	17.29 m	Maggie Lynes	15.91 m
discus throw	(Northern Ireland) Jackie McKernan	57.76 m	Janette Picton	52.94 m	(United States) Lacy Barnes	52.92 m
hammer throw	Fiona Whitehead	43.06 m	Lucy Mills	42.46 m	Tracy Oldfield	41.48 m
javelin throw	Sharon Gibson	57.34 m	(New Zealand) Kaye Nordstrom	54.16 m	Caroline White	53.46 m
heptathlon	Clova Court	5875 pts	Jenny Kelly	5667 pts	Charmaine Johnson	5400 pts

== Other AAA titles ==
Event	Gold		Silver		Bronze	
men's marathon	(Soviet Union) Yakov Tolstikov	2:09:1	(Portugal) Manuel Matias	2:10:21	(Poland) Jan Huruk	2:10:21
women's marathon	(Portugal) Rosa Mota	2:26:14	(United States) Francie Larrieu Smith	2:27:35	(Soviet Union) Valentina Yegorova	2:28:18

- + AAA marathon determined by 1991 London Marathon placings
