= 1987 European Athletics Indoor Championships – Women's 800 metres =

The women's 800 metres event at the 1987 European Athletics Indoor Championships was held on 21 and 22 February.

== Medalists ==
Gold	Silver	Bronze
Christine Wachtel; East Germany	Sigrun Wodars; East Germany	Lyubov Kiryukhina; Soviet Union

== Results ==
=== Heats ===
First 2 from each heat (Q) and the next 4 fastest (q) qualified for the final.

Rank	Heat	Name	Nationality	Time	Notes
1	1	Christine Wachtel	East Germany	2:01.41	Q
2	1	Lyubov Kiryukhina	Soviet Union	2:02.47	Q
3	2	Sigrun Wodars	East Germany	2:02.51	Q
4	1	Gabriela Sedláková	Czechoslovakia	2:03.07	q
5	1	Janet Bell	Great Britain	2:03.24	q
6	1	Montserrat Pujol	Spain	2:03.50	q
7	2	Slobodanka Čolović	Yugoslavia	2:04.34	Q
8	1	Ute Lix	West Germany	2:05.52	q
9	1	Jill McCabe	Sweden	2:05.70	
10	2	Rosa-María Colorado	Spain	2:06.33	
11	2	Krista Aukema	Netherlands	2:06.85	
12	2	Maria Pîntea	Romania	2:06.86	
13	2	Brigitte Brückner	West Germany	2:07.03	

=== Final ===
Rank	Name	Nationality	Time	Notes
1st place, gold medalist(s)	Christine Wachtel	East Germany	1:59.89	
2nd place, silver medalist(s)	Sigrun Wodars	East Germany	2:00.50	
3rd place, bronze medalist(s)	Lyubov Kiryukhina	Soviet Union	2:01.85	
4	Gabriela Sedláková	Czechoslovakia	2:02.24	
5	Montserrat Pujol	Spain	2:02.31	
6	Slobodanka Čolović	Yugoslavia	2:03.04	
7	Janet Bell	Great Britain	2:05.92	
8	Ute Lix	West Germany	2:09.14	
