= 1988 World Junior Championships in Athletics – Women's 1500 metres =

The women's 1500 metres event at the 1988 World Junior Championships in Athletics was held in Sudbury, Ontario, Canada, at Laurentian University Stadium on 30 and 31 July.

== Medalists ==
Gold	Doina Homneac; Romania
Silver	Snežana Pajkić; Yugoslavia
Bronze	Yvonne van der Kolk; Netherlands

== Results ==
=== Final ===
31 July

Rank	Name	Nationality	Time	Notes
1st place, gold medalist(s)	Doina Homneac	Romania	4:12.94	
2nd place, silver medalist(s)	Snežana Pajkić	Yugoslavia	4:16.19	
3rd place, bronze medalist(s)	Yvonne van der Kolk	Netherlands	4:16.35	
4	Ana Padurean	Romania	4:16.41	
5	Elena Politova	Soviet Union	4:18.19	
6	Ilse Smolders	Belgium	4:19.26	
7	Mónika Balint	Hungary	4:19.77	
8	Alexandra Reichling	West Germany	4:31.99	
9	Anne Lardner	New Zealand	4:32.28	
10	Monika Rönnholm	Finland	4:34.08	
11	Patrizia Di Napoli	Italy	4:34.65	
	Nicole Geukes	West Germany	DNF	

=== Heats ===
30 July

==== Heat 1 ====
Rank	Name	Nationality	Time	Notes
1	Snežana Pajkić	Yugoslavia	4:25.29	Q
2	Ilse Smolders	Belgium	4:25.54	Q
3	Ana Padurean	Romania	4:25.66	Q
4	Anne Lardner	New Zealand	4:25.85	Q
5	Nicole Geukes	West Germany	4:26.31	q
6	Jodie Bilotta	United States	4:33.30	
7	Julia Vaquero	Spain	4:34.01	
8	Nathalie Rouillard	Canada	4:34.91	
9	Natalya Vorobyova	Soviet Union	4:38.01	
10	Olga Zapeda	Honduras	5:11.77	

==== Heat 2 ====
Rank	Name	Nationality	Time	Notes
1	Doina Homneac	Romania	4:23.12	Q
2	Elena Politova	Soviet Union	4:23.89	Q
3	Yvonne van der Kolk	Netherlands	4:24.26	Q
4	Mónika Balint	Hungary	4:26.07	Q
5	Alexandra Reichling	West Germany	4:27.61	q
6	Monika Rönnholm	Finland	4:28.00	q
7	Patrizia Di Napoli	Italy	4:29.28	q
8	Getenesh Urge	Ethiopia	4:29.96	
9	Lianne McVey	Canada	4:37.73	
10	Jasmin Jones	United States	4:43.48	
	Liu Shixiang	China	DNF	
	Lorie Ann Adams	Guyana	DNF	

== Participation ==
According to an unofficial count, 22 athletes from 17 countries participated in the event.

- Belgium (1)
- Canada (2)
- China (1)
- Ethiopia (1)
- Finland (1)
- Guyana (1)
- Honduras (1)
- Hungary (1)
- Italy (1)
- Netherlands (1)
- New Zealand (1)
- Romania (2)
- Soviet Union (2)
- Spain (1)
- United States (2)
- West Germany (2)
- Yugoslavia (1)
