= 1986 World Junior Championships in Athletics – Women's 800 metres =

The women's 800 metres event at the 1986 World Junior Championships in Athletics was held in Athens, Greece, at Olympic Stadium on 16, 17 and 18 July.

== Medalists ==
Gold	Selina Chirchir; Kenya
Silver	Gabriela Sedláková; Czechoslovakia
Bronze	Adriana Dumitru; Romania

== Results ==
=== Final ===
18 July

Rank	Name	Nationality	Time	Notes
1st place, gold medalist(s)	Selina Chirchir	Kenya	2:01.40	
2nd place, silver medalist(s)	Gabriela Sedláková	Czechoslovakia	2:01.49	
3rd place, bronze medalist(s)	Adriana Dumitru	Romania	2:01.93	
4	Lynne Robinson	United Kingdom	2:02.18	
5	Katja Prochnow	East Germany	2:03.81	
6	Ellen Kiessling	East Germany	2:05.10	
7	Snežana Pajkić	Yugoslavia	2:07.75	
8	Eva-Christina Coqui	West Germany	2:08.41	

=== Semifinals ===
17 July

==== Semifinal 1 ====
Rank	Name	Nationality	Time	Notes
1	Gabriela Sedláková	Czechoslovakia	2:05.18	Q
2	Ellen Kiessling	East Germany	2:05.30	Q
3	Lynne Robinson	United Kingdom	2:05.35	Q
4	Denisa Zavelca	Romania	2:05.44	
5	Dorota Buczkowska	Poland	2:05.82	
6	Hassiba Boulmerka	Algeria	2:07.51	
7	Andrea Stuart	New Zealand	2:07.77	
8	Masako Matsumoto	Japan	2:08.88	

==== Semifinal 2 ====
Rank	Name	Nationality	Time	Notes
1	Selina Chirchir	Kenya	2:04.00	Q
2	Adriana Dumitru	Romania	2:04.54	Q
3	Katja Prochnow	East Germany	2:04.79	Q
4	Snežana Pajkić	Yugoslavia	2:04.99	q
5	Eva-Christina Coqui	West Germany	2:05.33	q
6	Monica Magnusson	Sweden	2:05.53	
7	Beata Hoffman	Poland	2:05.86	
8	Yvonne van der Kolk	Netherlands	2:07.08	

=== Heats ===
16 July

==== Heat 1 ====
Rank	Name	Nationality	Time	Notes
1	Selina Chirchir	Kenya	2:07.1	Q
2	Louise Stuart	United Kingdom	2:10.2	Q
3	Maura Savon	Cuba	2:10.5	
4	Petra Arnett	Canada	2:10.5	
5	Sasithorn Chantanuhong	Thailand	2:12.4	
6	Beena Peter	India	2:12.5	

==== Heat 2 ====
Rank	Name	Nationality	Time	Notes
1	Gabriela Sedláková	Czechoslovakia	2:06.41	Q
2	Monica Magnusson	Sweden	2:06.84	Q
3	Michelle O'Rourke	Australia	2:07.18	
4	Luisa do Nascimento	Brazil	2:07.93	
5	Patrizia Morreale	Italy	2:13.02	
6	Lorie Ann Adams	Guyana	2:20.38	
7	Lieketseng Mpopelle	Lesotho	2:36.01	

==== Heat 3 ====
Rank	Name	Nationality	Time	Notes
1	Katja Prochnow	East Germany	2:05.64	Q
2	Dorota Buczkowska	Poland	2:05.92	Q
3	Yvonne van der Kolk	Netherlands	2:06.82	q
4	Hassiba Boulmerka	Algeria	2:06.86	q
5	Masako Matsumoto	Japan	2:07.14	q
6	Donya Mohamed	Iraq	2:19.96	
7	Alma Leticia Jiménez	Guatemala	2:23.61	

==== Heat 4 ====
Rank	Name	Nationality	Time	Notes
1	Denisa Zavelca	Romania	2:06.97	Q
2	Lynne Robinson	United Kingdom	2:07.15	Q
3	Sophie Scamps	Australia	2:07.31	
4	Anastasía Giannákou	Greece	2:10.90	
5	Mireille Sankaatsing	Suriname	2:13.52	
6	Shola Lynch	United States	2:14.52	
7	Leila Dahmane	Tunisia	2:18.66	

==== Heat 5 ====
Rank	Name	Nationality	Time	Notes
1	Ellen Kiessling	East Germany	2:05.18	Q
2	Snežana Pajkić	Yugoslavia	2:05.60	Q
3	Beata Hoffman	Poland	2:07.01	q
4	Valerie Bertrand	United States	2:11.00	
5	Andrea Thomas	Jamaica	2:13.69	
6	Niusha Mansilla	Bolivia	2:21.10	
7	Puseletso Monkoe	Lesotho	2:25.74	

==== Heat 6 ====
Rank	Name	Nationality	Time	Notes
1	Adriana Dumitru	Romania	2:07.06	Q
2	Eva-Christina Coqui	West Germany	2:07.38	Q
3	Jayne Heathcote	United Kingdom	2:07.43	
4	Jennifer Mawby	Canada	2:09.68	
5	Maribel Silvestre	Dominican Republic	2:17.09	
6	Bertine Tré Gogo	Côte d'Ivoire	2:19.58	

== Participation ==
According to an unofficial count, 41 athletes from 32 countries participated in the event.

- Algeria (1)
- Australia (2)
- Bolivia (1)
- Brazil (1)
- Canada (2)
- Côte d'Ivoire (1)
- Cuba (1)
- Czechoslovakia (1)
- Dominican Republic (1)
- East Germany (2)
- Greece (1)
- Guatemala (1)
- Guyana (1)
- India (1)
- Iraq (1)
- Italy (1)
- Jamaica (1)
- Japan (1)
- Kenya (1)
- Lesotho (2)
- Netherlands (1)
- New Zealand (1)
- Poland (2)
- Romania (2)
- Suriname (1)
- Sweden (1)
- Thailand (1)
- Tunisia (1)
- United Kingdom (3)
- United States (2)
- West Germany (1)
- Yugoslavia (1)
