= 1987 IAAF World Indoor Championships – Women's 800 metres =

The women's 800 metres event at the 1987 IAAF World Indoor Championships was held at the Hoosier Dome in Indianapolis on 6 and 7 March.

== Medalists ==
Gold	Silver	Bronze
Christine Wachtel; East Germany	Gabriela Sedláková; Czechoslovakia	Lyubov Kiryukhina; Soviet Union

== Results ==
=== Heats ===
The first 2 of each heat (Q) and next 2 fastest (q) qualified for the final.

Rank	Heat	Name	Nationality	Time	Notes
1	2	Slobodanka Čolović	Yugoslavia	2:03.13	Q
2	2	Janet Bell	Great Britain	2:03.45	Q
3	1	Lyubov Kiryukhina	Soviet Union	2:03.63	Q
4	1	Gabriela Sedláková	Czechoslovakia	2:03.69	Q
5	1	Diana Richburg	United States	2:03.85	q
6	1	Maria Pintea	Romania	2:03.91	q
7	2	Violeta Beclea	Romania	2:04.03	
8	3	Christine Wachtel	East Germany	2:04.39	Q
9	3	Joetta Clark	United States	2:04.56	Q
10	3	Montserrat Pujol	Spain	2:04.88	
11	3	Soraya Telles	Brazil	2:05.09	AR
12	2	Maureen Stewart	Costa Rica	2:07.72	NR
13	2	Rosa Colorado	Spain	2:07.72	
14	3	Célestine N'Drin	Ivory Coast	2:07.96	NR
15	3	Alejandra Ramos	Chile	2:08.42	
16	2	Justine Craig	New Zealand	2:09.48	
17	1	Geeta Zutshi	India	2:10.79	
18	2	Donna Bean	Bermuda	2:13.98	NR
19	1	Cristina Girón	Guatemala	2:22.80	NR
	1	Sadoa Sowumi	Nigeria	DNS	

=== Final ===
Rank	Name	Nationality	Time	Notes
1st place, gold medalist(s)	Christine Wachtel	East Germany	2:01.32	CR
2nd place, silver medalist(s)	Gabriela Sedláková	Czechoslovakia	2:01.85	WJR
3rd place, bronze medalist(s)	Lyubov Kiryukhina	Soviet Union	2:01.98	
4	Slobodanka Čolović	Yugoslavia	2:02.33	
5	Janet Bell	Great Britain	2:02.96	
6	Joetta Clark	United States	2:03.92	
7	Maria Pintea	Romania	2:04.33	
8	Diana Richburg	United States	2:05.86	
