= Athletics at the 1979 Summer Universiade – Women's 800 metres =

The women's 800 metres event at the 1979 Summer Universiade was held at the Estadio Olimpico Universitario in Mexico City on 12 and 13 September 1979.

== Medalists ==
Gold	Silver	Bronze
Nadezhda Mushta; Soviet Union	Olga Dvirna; Soviet Union	Fița Lovin; Romania

== Results ==
=== Heats ===
Rank	Heat	Athlete	Nationality	Time	Notes
1	3	Olga Dvirna	Soviet Union	2:00.78	Q
2	3	Natalia Mărășescu	Romania	2:02.47	Q
3	2	Fița Lovin	Romania	2:02.93	Q
4	2	Gabriella Dorio	Italy	2:02.94	Q
5	3	Margherita Gargano	Italy	2:03.38	q
6	3	Janet Prictoe	Great Britain	2:03.39	q
7	1	Nadezhda Mushta	Soviet Union	2:03.43	Q
8	1	Galina Atanasova	Bulgaria	2:03.97	Q
9	2	Cherry Hanson	Great Britain	2:04.44	
10	1	Éva Mohácsi	Hungary	2:04.85	
11	2	Anne Mackie-Morelli	Canada	2:05.05	
12	1	Ana Orendain	Mexico	2:09.29	
13	3	Deborah Campbell	Canada	2:12.12	
14	1	Kay Hawkins	New Zealand	2:15.32	
15	2	Marta Vázquez	Mexico	2:20.80	
16	1	Sonia Lemus	Guatemala	2:31.64	
17	3	Lai Wah Ho	Hong Kong	2:35.95	

=== Final ===
Rank	Athlete	Nationality	Time	Notes
1st place, gold medalist(s)	Nadezhda Mushta	Soviet Union	2:00.50	
2nd place, silver medalist(s)	Olga Dvirna	Soviet Union	2:00.77	
3rd place, bronze medalist(s)	Fița Lovin	Romania	2:00.81	
4	Gabriella Dorio	Italy	2:01.60	
5	Janet Prictoe	Great Britain	2:03.21	
6	Galina Atanasova	Bulgaria	2:03.29	
7	Margherita Gargano	Italy	2:05.54	
	Natalia Mărășescu	Romania	DNS	
