= 1991 IAAF World Indoor Championships – Women's 800 metres =

The women's 800 metres event at the 1991 IAAF World Indoor Championships was held on 8, 9 and 10 March.

== Medalists ==
Gold	Silver	Bronze
Christine Wachtel; Germany	Violeta Beclea; Romania	Ella Kovacs; Romania

== Results ==
=== Heats ===
First 3 of each heat (Q) and next 3 fastest (q) qualified for the semifinals.

Rank	Heat	Name	Nationality	Time	Notes
1	1	Ella Kovacs	Romania	2:02.86	Q
2	2	Christine Wachtel	Germany	2:03.26	Q
3	2	Violeta Beclea	Romania	2:03.50	Q
4	1	Aisling Molloy	Ireland	2:03.56	Q
5	1	Gabriela Lesch	Germany	2:03.70	Q
5	2	Charmaine Crooks	Canada	2:03.70	Q
7	2	Joetta Clark	United States	2:03.84	q
8	1	Małgorzata Rydz	Poland	2:04.03	q
9	1	Olga Burkanova	Soviet Union	2:05.00	q
10	3	Lyubov Gurina	Soviet Union	2:05.37	Q
11	3	Sharon Stewart	Australia	2:05.54	Q, AR
12	3	Meredith Rainey	United States	2:05.64	Q
13	3	Helena Dziurová	Czechoslovakia	2:07.58	
14	2	Carmen Arrúa	Argentina	2:07.70	NR
15	3	Li Wenhong	China	2:07.93	NR
	1	Evelyn Musonda	Zambia	DQ	
	2	Lasnet Nkouka	Republic of the Congo	DNS	

=== Semifinals ===
First 3 of each semifinal (Q) qualified directly for the final.

Rank	Heat	Name	Nationality	Time	Notes
1	2	Violeta Beclea	Romania	2:01.44	Q
2	2	Lyubov Gurina	Soviet Union	2:01.48	Q
3	2	Charmaine Crooks	Canada	2:01.63	Q, NR
4	1	Christine Wachtel	Germany	2:01.70	Q
5	1	Ella Kovacs	Romania	2:01.75	Q
6	2	Joetta Clark	United States	2:02.02	
7	1	Meredith Rainey	United States	2:02.19	Q
8	2	Gabriela Lesch	Germany	2:02.68	
9	1	Aisling Molloy	Ireland	2:02.93	
10	1	Olga Burkanova	Soviet Union	2:03.51	
11	1	Małgorzata Rydz	Poland	2:03.54	
12	2	Sharon Stewart	Australia	2:03.98	AR

=== Final ===
Rank	Name	Nationality	Time	Notes
1st place, gold medalist(s)	Christine Wachtel	Germany	2:01.51	
2nd place, silver medalist(s)	Violeta Beclea	Romania	2:01.75	
3rd place, bronze medalist(s)	Ella Kovacs	Romania	2:01.79	
4	Lyubov Gurina	Soviet Union	2:02.04	
5	Charmaine Crooks	Canada	2:02.27	
6	Meredith Rainey	United States	2:04.82	
