= Athletics at the 1990 Commonwealth Games – Men's 110 metres hurdles =

Men's 110 metres hurdles at the Commonwealth Games

The men's 110 metres hurdles event at the 1990 Commonwealth Games was held on 27 and 28 January at the Mount Smart Stadium in Auckland.

== Medalists ==
Gold	Silver	Bronze
Colin Jackson; Wales	Tony Jarrett; England	David Nelson; England

== Results ==
=== Heats ===
Qualification: First 4 of each heat (Q) and the next 1 fastest (q) qualified for the final.

Wind:
Heat 1: +1.0 m/s, Heat 2: +3.0 m/s

Rank	Heat	Name	Nationality	Time	Notes
1	1	Colin Jackson	Wales	13.11	Q,=ER, GR
2	2	Hugh Teape	England	13.64	Q
3	2	Tony Jarrett	England	13.65	Q
4	1	David Nelson	England	13.71	Q
5	2	Nigel Walker	Wales	13.87	Q
6	2	Kyle Vander-Kuyp	Australia	14.15	Q
7	2	Tim Soper	New Zealand	14.18	q
8	1	Akwasi Abrefah	Ghana	14.23	Q
9	1	Grant McNeil	New Zealand	14.24	Q
	1	Paul Lloyd	New Zealand	DNF	Q

=== Final ===
Wind: +0.5 m/s

Rank	Lane	Name	Nationality	Time	Notes
1st place, gold medalist(s)	3	Colin Jackson	Wales	13.08	ER, GR
2nd place, silver medalist(s)	6	Tony Jarrett	England	13.34	
3rd place, bronze medalist(s)	4	David Nelson	England	13.54	
4	5	Hugh Teape	England	13.58	
5	8	Nigel Walker	Wales	13.78	
6	2	Kyle Vander-Kuyp	Australia	14.07	
7	7	Akwasi Abrefah	Ghana	14.12	
8	1	Grant McNeil	New Zealand	14.20	
9	9	Tim Soper	New Zealand	14.28	
