= 1985 European Athletics Indoor Championships – Women's 800 metres =

The women's 800 metres event at the 1985 European Athletics Indoor Championships was held on 2 and 3 March.

== Medalists ==
Gold	Silver	Bronze
Ella Kovacs; Romania	Nadiya Olizarenko; Soviet Union	Cristieana Cojocaru; Romania

== Results ==
=== Heats ===
First 2 from each heat (Q) and the next 2 fastest (q) qualified for the final.

Rank	Heat	Name	Nationality	Time	Notes
1	1	Ella Kovacs	Romania	2:02.18	Q
2	1	Nadiya Olizarenko	Soviet Union	2:03.12	Q
3	2	Kirsty McDermott	Great Britain	2:03.42	Q
4	2	Cristieana Cojocaru	Romania	2:03.88	Q
5	1	Rosa Colorado	Spain	2:04.03	q
6	1	Slobodanka Čolović	Yugoslavia	2:04.04	q
7	1	Petra Kleinbrahm	West Germany	2:04.44	
8	2	Sigrun Ludwigs	East Germany	2:04.62	
9	2	Mayte Zúñiga	Spain	2:06.21	
10	2	Svobodka Damyanova	Bulgaria	2:06.76	
	1	Zuzana Moravčíková	Czechoslovakia	DNF	

=== Final ===
Rank	Name	Nationality	Time	Notes
1st place, gold medalist(s)	Ella Kovacs	Romania	2:00.51	
2nd place, silver medalist(s)	Nadiya Olizarenko	Soviet Union	2:00.90	
3rd place, bronze medalist(s)	Cristieana Cojocaru	Romania	2:01.01	
4	Rosa Colorado	Spain	2:04.53	
5	Slobodanka Čolović	Yugoslavia	2:06.38	
6	Kirsty McDermott	Great Britain	2:07.98	
