= Team Solent =

The term Team Solent may refer to:

- Solent University F.C., a former association football club attached to Solent University, based in Southampton, Hampshire.
- Southampton Athletic Club, the name of an athletics club that was merged into SAC in 2004
