= 1988 World Junior Championships in Athletics – Women's 800 metres =

The women's 800 metres event at the 1988 World Junior Championships in Athletics was held in Sudbury, Ontario, Canada, at Laurentian University Stadium on 27, 28 and 29 July.

== Medalists ==
Gold	Birthe Bruhns; East Germany
Silver	Catalina Gheorghiu; Romania
Bronze	Dorota Buczkowska; Poland

== Results ==
=== Final ===
29 July

Rank	Name	Nationality	Time	Notes
1st place, gold medalist(s)	Birthe Bruhns	East Germany	2:00.67	
2nd place, silver medalist(s)	Catalina Gheorghiu	Romania	2:01.96	
3rd place, bronze medalist(s)	Dorota Buczkowska	Poland	2:02.94	
4	Olga Burkanova	Soviet Union	2:04.94	
5	Carol Holmen	Canada	2:06.60	
6	Snežana Pajkić	Yugoslavia	2:07.56	
7	Luminita Avasiloaie	Romania	2:07.61	
8	Daniele Steinecke	East Germany	2:08.18	

=== Semifinals ===
28 July

==== Semifinal 1 ====
Rank	Name	Nationality	Time	Notes
1	Birthe Bruhns	East Germany	2:06.08	Q
2	Catalina Gheorghiu	Romania	2:06.33	Q
3	Olga Burkanova	Soviet Union	2:06.74	Q
4	Lizzy Immesoete	Belgium	2:06.84	
5	Helena Zímová	Czechoslovakia	2:07.21	
6	Carla Sacramento	Portugal	2:07.24	
7	Paula Fryer	United Kingdom	2:09.04	
8	Erzsebet Todorán	Hungary	2:09.99	

==== Semifinal 2 ====
Rank	Name	Nationality	Time	Notes
1	Snežana Pajkić	Yugoslavia	2:05.43	Q
2	Dorota Buczkowska	Poland	2:05.68	Q
3	Daniele Steinecke	East Germany	2:06.15	Q
4	Luminita Avasiloaie	Romania	2:06.38	q
5	Carol Holmen	Canada	2:06.64	q
6	Daniela Di Santo	Italy	2:07.68	
7	Mónika Balint	Hungary	2:08.33	
8	Shola Lynch	United States	2:09.80	

=== Heats ===
27 July

==== Heat 1 ====
Rank	Name	Nationality	Time	Notes
1	Snežana Pajkić	Yugoslavia	2:05.96	Q
2	Olga Burkanova	Soviet Union	2:06.21	Q
3	Mónika Balint	Hungary	2:06.45	Q
4	Carol Holmen	Canada	2:06.80	q
5	Paula Fryer	United Kingdom	2:07.20	q
6	Ausa Mwendachabe	Zambia	2:14.72	
7	Olga Zapeda	Honduras	2:34.73	

==== Heat 2 ====
Rank	Name	Nationality	Time	Notes
1	Daniele Steinecke	East Germany	2:07.18	Q
2	Helena Zímová	Czechoslovakia	2:07.22	Q
3	Luminita Avasiloaie	Romania	2:07.42	Q
4	Grete Slettom	Norway	2:07.69	
5	Nathalie Rouillard	Canada	2:07.88	
6	Mireille Sankaatsing	Suriname	2:11.47	

==== Heat 3 ====
Rank	Name	Nationality	Time	Notes
1	Lizzy Immesoete	Belgium	2:09.34	Q
2	Catalina Gheorghiu	Romania	2:09.60	Q
3	Dorota Buczkowska	Poland	2:10.45	Q
4	Marlen Estévez	Cuba	2:11.73	
5	Chandel Marion	United States	2:17.57	
	Lorie Ann Adams	Guyana	DQ	
	Célia dos Santos	Brazil	DQ	

==== Heat 4 ====
Rank	Name	Nationality	Time	Notes
1	Birthe Bruhns	East Germany	2:06.73	Q
2	Erzsebet Todorán	Hungary	2:07.12	Q
3	Carla Sacramento	Portugal	2:07.15	Q
4	Daniela Di Santo	Italy	2:07.18	q
5	Shola Lynch	United States	2:07.52	q
6	Alma Leticia Jiménez	Guatemala	2:07.54	
	Sonia Escalera	Puerto Rico	DQ	

== Participation ==
According to an unofficial count, 27 athletes from 22 countries participated in the event.

- Belgium (1)
- Brazil (1)
- Canada (2)
- Cuba (1)
- Czechoslovakia (1)
- East Germany (2)
- Guatemala (1)
- Guyana (1)
- Honduras (1)
- Hungary (2)
- Italy (1)
- Norway (1)
- Poland (1)
- Portugal (1)
- Puerto Rico (1)
- Romania (2)
- Soviet Union (1)
- Suriname (1)
- United Kingdom (1)
- United States (2)
- Yugoslavia (1)
- Zambia (1)
