= 1986 European Athletics Indoor Championships – Women's 800 metres =

The women's 800 metres event at the 1986 European Athletics Indoor Championships was held on 22 and 23 February.

== Medalists ==
Gold	Silver	Bronze
Sigrun Ludwigs; East Germany	Cristieana Cojocaru; Romania	Slobodanka Čolović; Yugoslavia

== Results ==
=== Heats ===
First 2 of each heat (Q) and the next 2 fastest (q) qualified for the final.

Rank	Heat	Name	Nationality	Time	Notes
1	1	Sigrun Ludwigs	East Germany	2:04.26	Q
2	1	Ella Kovacs	Romania	2:04.38	Q
3	1	Slobodanka Čolović	Yugoslavia	2:04.39	q
4	1	Catherine Guerrero	France	2:05.29	q
5	2	Kirsty McDermott	Great Britain	2:07.13	Q
6	2	Cristieana Cojocaru	Romania	2:07.40	Q
7	2	Nadine Debois	France	2:08.39	
8	1	Amaia Andrés	Spain	2:08.58	
9	2	Mayte Zúñiga	Spain	2:09.39	

=== Final ===
Rank	Name	Nationality	Time	Notes
1st place, gold medalist(s)	Sigrun Ludwigs	East Germany	1:59.89	
2nd place, silver medalist(s)	Cristieana Cojocaru	Romania	2:01.54	
3rd place, bronze medalist(s)	Slobodanka Čolović	Yugoslavia	2:03.28	
4	Kirsty McDermott	Great Britain	2:03.69	
5	Ella Kovacs	Romania	2:08.96	
	Catherine Guerrero	France	DNF	
