= Dawn Gandy =

Former British athlete

Personal information
- Nationality: British (English)
- Born: 28 July 1965 (age 61) Southampton, England

Sport
- Sport: Athletics
- Event: middle-distance
- Club: Southampton & Eastleigh A.A.C.

Dawn Suzanne Gandy (born 28 July 1965) is an English former athlete who competed mainly in the 800 metres. She represented England at the 1994 Commonwealth Games and won four AAA Indoor Championships titles. She also finished second at the 1989 UK Championships and 1994 AAA Championships. Her 800m best of 2:01.87 was set in June 1988. Her twin sister, Simone Laidlow, is also a former international athlete.

== Biography ==
Born in Southampton, Gandy was a member of Southampton & Eastleigh A.A.C. and was a junior 400 metres international in 1982, with a junior best of 54.22 secs, and a senior international indoors in 1983. She won the 400m title at the 1987 AAA Indoor Championships in 55.67 and ran her 400m best of 53.8 on 4 July 1987. Three weeks later she ran 53.98 at the 1987 AAA Championships.

Gandy began concentrating on the 800m, running 2:03.54 on 23 August 1987. She defeated Janet Bell to win the 1988 AAA Indoor 800m title in 2:05.62, and went on to reach the semifinals of the European Indoor Championships in Budapest, running 2:04.50. Three months later, she finished third at the 1988 UK Championships behind Christina Cahill and Kirsty Wade, running 2:03.69. By now a member of Hounslow AC, her lifetime best of 2:01.87 set on 19 June at the GBR v France v Soviet Union international in Portsmouth, would stand as the club record until broken by Shelayna Oskan-Clarke in 2015. In August 1988, she finished fifth at the AAA Championships/Olympic trials.

Gandy ran 2:03.98 to finish second behind Ann Williams at the 1989 UK Championships. In 1990, she won the AAA Indoor 800m title for the second time and went on to reach the semifinals at the European Indoor Championships in Glasgow, running 2:05.44. She again won the AAA Indoor 800m title in 1992, and went on to finish fifth at the 1992 AAA Championships/Olympic trials.

In 1994, Gandy finished second behind Diane Modahl at the AAA Championships in 2:03.75, to earn selection for the Commonwealth Games, where she was eliminated in the heats in 2:06.52.

== International competitions ==
| Year | Competition | Venue | Position | Notes |
Representing Great Britain
| 1988 | European Indoor Championships | Budapest, Hungary | 8th (sf) | 2:04.50 |
| 1990 | European Indoor Championships | Glasgow, United Kingdom | 9th (sf) | 2:05.44 |
Representing England
| 1994 | Commonwealth Games | Victoria, Canada | 12th (h) | 2:06.52 |
(#) Indicates overall position in qualifying heats (h) or semifinals (sf)

=== National titles ===
- AAA Indoor Championships 400 metres (1987)
- AAA Indoor Championships 800 metres (1988, 1990, 1992)
