= Mireille Sankatsing =

Surinamese athletics competitor

Personal information
- Born: 19 September 1969 (age 56)

Sport
- Sport: Track and field

Mireille Sankatsing (sometimes spelled Sankaatsing; born 19 September 1969) is a female former track and field athlete from Suriname, who competed in the 400, 800 and 1500 metres. She represented her country in the 800 metres at the 1986 World Junior Championships in Athletics, the 1987 Pan American Games, the 1987 World Championships in Athletics and the 1988 World Junior Championships in Athletics. She competed in the 1500 metres at the 1986 World Junior Championships as well. Sankatsing also competed in the 400 metres at the 1993 Summer Universiade, finishing sixth in the final with a time of 54.87 seconds.

From 1989 to 1992, she attended Eastern Michigan University. In 1992 she became the school's first national champion in women's track when she won the 800 metres at the NCAA Indoor Championships in a time of 2:03.47, the fastest time by a woman collegian that season. She is married to Keith Smith who represented the United States Virgin Islands at the 1992 Summer Olympics in the 200 metres.
