= 1986 UK Athletics Championships =

British athletics event

- Dates: 25 & 26 May 1986
- Host city: Cwmbran, Wales
- Venue: Cwmbran Stadium
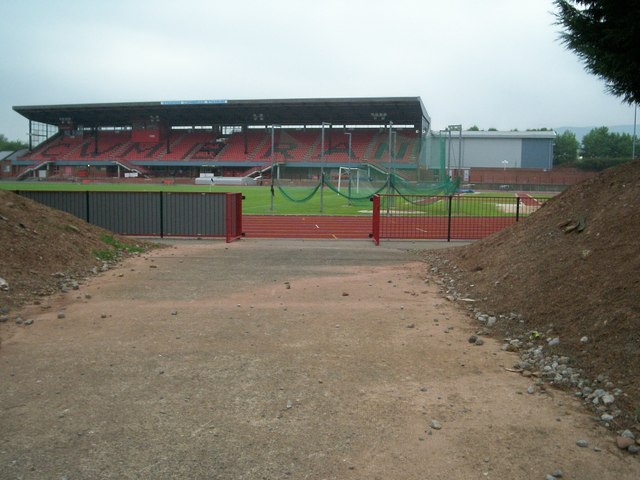
- Level: Senior
- Type: Outdoor

The 1986 UK Athletics Championships was the national championship in outdoor track and field for the United Kingdom held at Cwmbran Stadium, Cwmbran, Wales. It was the fourth time the event was held in the Welsh town.

It was the tenth edition of the competition limited to British athletes only, launched as an alternative to the AAA Championships, which was open to foreign competitors. However, because the calibre of national competition remained greater at the AAA event, the UK Championships this year were not considered the principal national championship event by some statisticians, such as the National Union of Track Statisticians (NUTS). Many of the athletes also competed at the 1986 AAA Championships.

== Summary ==
The women's 5000 metres was dropped from the programme and replaced by a women's 10,000 metres event.

Fatima Whitbread won her sixth consecutive women's javelin throw UK title, while shot putters Billy Cole and Judy Oakes both won a third straight title. Amongst the men's 1985 champions, John Regis (200 m), Phil Brown (400 m), Kevin Capper (steeplechase), Geoff Parsons (high jump), Andy Ashurst (pole vault) and Mick Hill (javelin) successfully defended their titles. Kathy Cook was the only woman other than Whitbread and Oakes to have a repeat win. Sprinter Sandra Whittaker was the only person to reach the podium in two events.

The main international track and field competition for the United Kingdom that year was the 1986 European Athletics Championships. UK champions Fatima Whitbread and Jack Buckner (5000 m) went on to become European champions, while Yvonne Murray (UK runner-up) took a 3000 m bronze. The four countries of the United Kingdom competed separately at the Commonwealth Games that year as well. UK Championships athletes to become Commonwealth gold medalists there included Roger Black (400 m), John Herbert (triple jump), Liz Lynch (10,000 m), Sally Gunnell (100 m hurdles), Joyce Oladapo (long jump), Andy Ashurst (pole vault) and Billy Cole (shot put).

== Medal summary ==
=== Men ===
Event	Gold		Silver		Bronze	
100m	(Scotland) Jamie Henderson	10.49	Fenton Campbell	10.63	Clarence Callender	10.69
200m	John Regis	21.34	Stewart Weathers	21.43	Todd Bennett	21.47
400m	Phil Brown	45.29	(Scotland) Brian Whittle	45.38	Roger Black	45.48
800m	Peter Elliott	1:46.66	David Sharpe	1:47.01	Steve Crabb	1:47.14
1,500m	Rob Harrison	3:35.74	John Gladwin	3:36.28	(Wales) Neil Horsfield	3:42.86
5,000m	Jack Buckner	13:52.30	Mark Rowland	13:54.64	(Scotland) John Robson	13:56.61
10,000m	Karl Harrison	28:21.93	Mark Dalloway	28:22.56	Peter Tootell	28:26.29
110m hurdles	(Wales) Colin Jackson	13.73	(Wales) Nigel Walker	14.09	Wilbert Greaves	14.16
400m hurdles	Max Robertson	49.99	Martin Gillingham	51.24	Mark Holtom	51.32
3000m steeplechase	Kevin Capper	8:36.14	Colin Walker	8:37.87	Andy Taylor	8:37.89
10,000m walk	Phil Vesty	41:54.87	Steve Johnson	43:40.89	Chris Smith	44:51.52
high jump	(Scotland) Geoff Parsons	2.24 m	Dalton Grant	2.15 m	Fuzz Ahmed Floyd Manderson	2.10 m
pole vault	Andy Ashurst	5.30 m	Keith Stock	5.00 m	Jeff Gutteridge Brian Hooper	5.00 m
long jump	Derrick Brown	7.69 m	John King	7.57 m	Dwayne Heard	7.41 m
triple jump	John Herbert	16.96 m w	Mike Makin	16.35 m	Lawrence Lynch	15.95 m w
shot put	Billy Cole	18.68 m	Graham Savory	17.68 m	Andy Vince	17.56 m
discus throw	Graham Savory	58.10 m	Peter Gordon	56.58 m	Jeff Clare	51.48 m
hammer throw	Paul Head	67.48 m	Mick Jones	66.52 m	Andrew Tolputt	60.38 m
javelin throw	Mick Hill	73.74 m	Gary Jenson	73.50 m	Peter Yates	72.14 m

=== Women ===
Event	Gold		Silver		Bronze	
100m	Paula Dunn	11.65	Wendy Hoyte	11.70	(Scotland) Sandra Whittaker	11.75
200m	Kathy Cook	23.80	(Scotland) Sandra Whittaker	23.92	Joan Baptiste	24.02
400m	Angela Piggford	53.09	Suzanne Guise	53.40	Helen Barnett	53.46
800m	(Scotland) Anne Purvis	2:01.63	Helen Thorpe	2:02.02	Lorraine Baker	2:02.74
1,500m	Christina Boxer	4:08.68	(Scotland) Christine Whittingham	4:09.23	Suzanne Morley	4:11.48
3,000m	Wendy Sly	8:52.94	(Scotland) Yvonne Murray	8:56.00	Christine Benning	8:56.30
10,000m	(Scotland) Liz Lynch	32:59.59	Jill Clarke	33:27.71	Lynn Everington	33:34.03
100m hurdles	Sally Gunnell	13.50	Lesley-Ann Skeete	13.57	Wendy Jeal	13.60
400m hurdles	Yvette Wray	57.88	Simone Gandy	58.18	Jennie Pearson	58.91
5000m walk	Lisa Langford	24:38.99	Vicky Lawrence	25:18.37	Julie Drake	25:30.25
high jump	Diana Davies	1.88 m	(Northern Ireland) Sharon McPeake	1.85 m	Ann-Marie Cording	1.80 m
long jump	Kim Hagger	6.39 m	Joyce Oladapo	6.25 m	Sharon Bowie	6.25 m
shot put	Judy Oakes	19.00 m	Myrtle Augee	17.00 m	Yvonne Hanson-Nortey	16.12 m
discus throw	(Wales) Venissa Head	55.74 m	Julia Avis	52.90 m	Karen Pugh	51.82 m
javelin throw	Fatima Whitbread	68.98 m	Sharon Gibson	55.84 m	Karen Hough	55.46 m
