= Aisling Molloy =

Irish middle-distance runner

Personal information
- Nationality: Irish
- Born: 12 June 1964 (age 62)

Sport
- Sport: Athletics
- Event: middle-distance

Aisling Molloy (born 12 June 1964) is an Irish retired middle-distance runner who competed primarily in the 800 meters. She represented her country at one indoor and two outdoor World Championships.

== Biography ==
Molloy studied at the Brigham Young University.

Molloy finished second behind Ann Williams in the 800 metres event at the British 1990 AAA Championships and third behind Diane Edwards in the 800 metres event at the British 1992 AAA Championships

Molloy's personal bests in the event are 2:01.14 outdoors (Split 1990) and 2:02.87 indoors (Glasgow 1990).

== Competition record ==
Year	Competition	Venue	Position	Event	Notes
Representing Ireland
1989	European Indoor Championships	The Hague, Netherlands	7th (h)	800 m	2:05.44
1990	European Indoor Championships	Glasgow, United Kingdom	6th	800 m	2:05.98
1990	European Championships	Split, Yugoslavia	16th (sf)	800 m	2:04.20
1991	World Indoor Championships	Seville, Spain	9th (sf)	800 m	2:02.93
1991	World Championships	Tokyo, Japan	16th (h)	800 m	2:02.31
1991	World Championships	Tokyo, Japan	32nd (h)	1500 m	4:16.61
1994	European Championships	Helsinki, Finland	22nd (h)	800 m	2:08.46
1995	World Championships	Gothenburg, Sweden	28th (h)	800 m	2:04.15
