= Ellen Kiessling =

German athlete (born 1968)

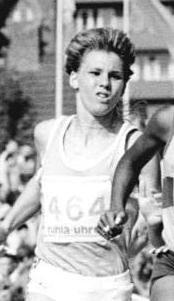
- Kiessling competing in Neubrandenburg in 1989

Medal record

Women's athletics

Representing East Germany

European Championships
Silver medal – second place	1990 Split	1500 m

World Indoor Championships
Bronze medal – third place	1989 Budapest	800 m

European Indoor Championships
Silver medal – second place	1989 The Hague	800 m

Ellen Buchleitner (née Kiessling, born 17 February 1968) is a German former track and field athlete who was a middle-distance specialist. Representing East Germany, she won a silver medal in the 800 metres at the 1989 European Indoor Championships and a bronze medal in the 800 m at the 1989 World Indoor Championships, before going on to win a silver medal in the 1500 metres at the 1990 European Championships. She won three East German national titles.

Representing Germany, she finished fifth in the 1500 m final at the 1991 World Championships and competed at the 1992 Barcelona Olympics. An eight-time unified Germany national champion, her winning indoor 1500 m time from 1991 remains the championship record. Her personal bests include 1:59.41 for the 800 metres, 4:04.44 for the 1500 metres and 8:46.99 for 3000 metres. She began competing as Ellen Buchleitner after marrying Austrian runner Michael Buchleitner in 1994.

== Career ==
Born in Freital, Bezirk Dresden, she joined Dresdner SC and started working with the club's athletics coach Klaus Müller. Her first international medal for East Germany came on home soil in Cottbus, where she took the 800 metres bronze medal at the 1985 European Athletics Junior Championships. The 1986 World Junior Championships in Athletics followed and at that meet she was sixth in the 800 m, but helped the East German 4 × 400 metres relay team to a bronze medal by running in the heats stage. She began to run longer distances and won the Willi Sänger Memorial 5K run in 1988.

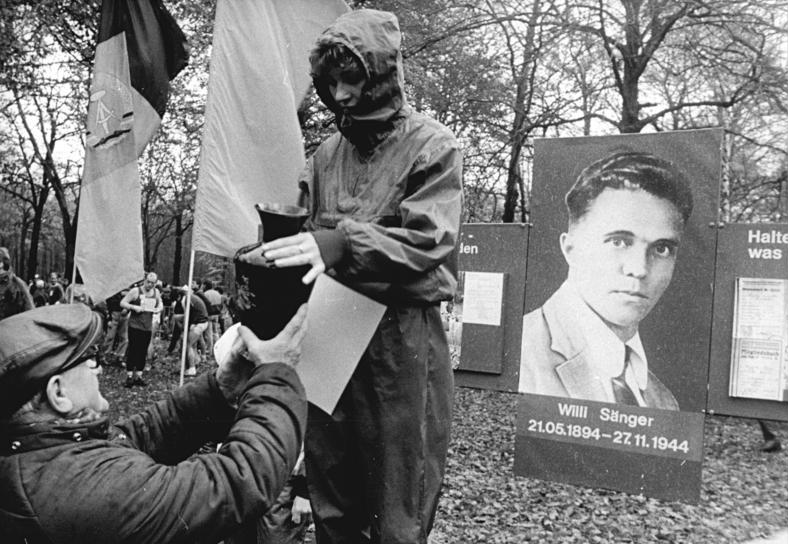
Kiessling receiving the winner's trophy for the 1988 Willi Sänger Memorial

Kiessling took her first national title at the East German Athletics Championships in 1989. That year proved to be the peak of her career. She began by winning her first senior medal at the 1989 European Athletics Indoor Championships, taking the runner-up spot behind Romania's Doina Melinte. The following month she recorded a lifetime indoor best of 1:59.68 minutes at the 1989 IAAF World Indoor Championships – this brought her the bronze medal as the top three all finished within half a second, beaten only by her compatriot Christine Wachtel and Soviet runner Tatyana Grebenchuk. In the outdoor season she set three further lifetime bests: 1:59.41 minutes for the 800 m, 4:04.44 minutes for the 1500 m and 8:46.99 minutes for the 3000 metres. Her 1500 m best, recorded in East Berlin, ranked her seventh in the world on time that season. She was the fourth-place finisher at the European Cup (1500 m) and 1989 IAAF World Cup (3000 m).

Kiessling proved to be the final East German 1500 m champion in 1990, winning both indoors and out. Her international success continued that year as although she narrowly missed a medal at the 1990 European Athletics Indoor Championships, coming fourth behind Britain's Lorraine Baker, she won the first and only major outdoor senior medal of her career at the 1990 European Athletics Championships – her 1500 m silver behind Snežana Pajkić meant the East German women featured in the top two of all track events from 100 metres up to 1500 m that year.

After the unification of Germany, she began competing for the new German team in 1991. She became the country's first post-unification 1500 m champion with a win at the German Indoor Athletics Championships. Her winning time of 4:05.50 minutes remains (as of 2015) a championship record. She built on this by winning over the same distance at the German Athletics Championships later that year. She won a 1500 m bronze for the hosts at the 1991 European Cup in Frankfurt before going on to take fifth place in the event at the 1991 World Championships in Athletics. She repeated her indoor and outdoor national title double in the 1992 season and went on to represent Germany at the 1992 Summer Olympics. However, at the Olympics in Barcelona she failed to finish in the first round and was eliminated. This was her only Olympic appearance and her last major outing at world level. She ended the 1992 season with a win at the Natternbach Silvesterlauf 5K.

She missed the 1993 season but returned in 1994 to reclaimed her indoor and outdoor national titles from Antje Beggerow and Simone Weidner, respectively. In what was her final year of major international competition, she ranked highly but failed to win a medal, placing fifth at the 1994 European Athletics Indoor Championships, fourth at the 1994 European Cup and seventh at the 1994 European Athletics Championships. She ran for the ASV Köln sports club that year and was part of its national championship winning 3 × 800 m relay team.

She did not compete in major championships after 1994, but claimed her eighth German title in the 1500 m in 1995 (bringing her national title total to eleven).

After she retired from the sport, she began working as a make-up artist. She and Michael Buchleitner (an Austrian runner) married in 1994 and the pair had a daughter in 1999 and a son in 2008.

== Personal bests ==
All information from Tilastopaja

- 800 metres – 1:59.41 minutes (1989)
- 1500 metres – 4:04.44 minutes (1989)
- Mile run – 4:26.66 minutes (1990)
- 3000 metres – 8:46.99 minutes (1989)
- 800 metres (indoor) – 1:59.68 minutes (1989)
- 1500 metres (indoor) – 4:06.50 minutes (1991)

== National titles ==
- East German Athletics Championships
  - 1500 metres: 1989, 1990
- East German Indoor Athletics Championships
  - 1500 metres: 1990
- German Athletics Championships
  - 1500 metres: 1991, 1992, 1994, 1995
  - 3×800 m relay: 1994
- German Indoor Athletics Championships
  - 1500 metres: 1991, 1992, 1994

== International competitions ==
Year	Competition	Venue	Position	Event	Notes
Representing East Germany
1985	European Junior Championships	Cottbus, East Germany	3rd	800 m	2:04.18
1986	World Junior Championships	Athens, Greece	6th	800 m	2:05.10
1986	World Junior Championships	Athens, Greece	3rd	4 × 400 m relay	3:35.92 (heats only)
1989	European Indoor Championships	The Hague, Netherlands	2nd	800 m	2:01.24
1989	World Indoor Championships	Budapest, Hungary	3rd	800 m	1:59.68
1989	European Cup	Gateshead, United Kingdom	4th	3000 m	9:04.26
1989	World Cup	Barcelona, Spain	4th	3000 m	8:54.50
1990	European Indoor Championships	Glasgow, United Kingdom	4th	800 m	2:02.58
1990	European Championships	Split, Yugoslavia	2nd	1500 m	4:08.67
Representing Germany
1991	European Cup	Frankfurt, Germany	3rd	1500 m	4:05.13
1991	World Championships	Tokyo, Japan	5th	1500 m	4:04.75
1992	Olympic Games	Barcelona, Spain	—	1500 m	DNF (heats)
1994	European Indoor Championships	Paris, France	5th	1500 m	4:10.68
1994	European Cup	Birmingham, United Kingdom	4th	1500 m	4:10.82
1994	European Championships	Helsinki, Finland	7th	1500 m	4:20.79

== See also ==
- List of European Athletics Championships medalists (women)
