= Janet Bell =

British female runner

Janet Bell née Prictoe
Personal information
- Nationality: British (English)
- Born: 15 January 1959 (age 67) Marlborough, Wiltshire, England

Sport
- Sport: Athletics
- Event: middle-distance
- Club: Lincoln AC

Janet Bell (née Prictoe, born 15 January 1959) is an English former middle-distance runner who specialised in the 800 metres. She won the 1987 AAA Indoor Championships title and went on to finish fifth in the 800m finals at the 1987 World Indoor Championships and 1988 European Indoor Championships.

== Early life ==
Janet is the only daughter of Ione Tognini. She grew up in Lincoln, and attended Lincoln Girls' High School, a grammar school.

== Career ==
Prictoe finished third behind Christina Boxer in the 800 metres event at the 1977 WAAA Championships.

In 1978, Prictoe was second in the 800 metres at the UK Championships in 2:04.78, and second again behind Christina Boxer at the 1978 WAAA Championships in 2:03.11, just one-one hundredth of a second behind the winner. She went on to compete at the 1978 European Championships, where she was eliminated in the heats. She also finished second at the 1979 AAAs Championships behind Christine Benning.

Prictoe's third-place finish at the 1981 AAAs Indoor Championships behind Kirsty McDermott and Lorraine Baker would be her last medal at a national championships until she won the 1987 AAAs indoor title in 2:04.18, ahead of Baker.

Prictoe married athlete Alan bell in Barnsley during 1986 and competed under her married name thereafter.They have four children.

At the 1987 European Indoor Championships, Bell ran 2:03.24 in her heat to qualify for the final as a fastest loser, where she finished seventh in 2:05.92. A month later at the 1987 IAAF World Indoor Championships in Indianapolis, she ran 2:03.45 to finish second in her heat and improved to 2:02.96 for fifth in the final. Outdoors, she finished third at the UK Championships behind Diane Edwards and Shireen Bailey in 2:02.41, before achieving her lifetime best with 2:01.40 on 11 July at the Crystal Palace in London.

In 1988, Bell finished second at the AAAs Indoor Championships behind Dawn Gandy in 2:06.01, before again reaching the final of the 800m at the European Indoor Championships, finishing fifth in an indoor best of 2:02.70, which at the time ranked her fourth on the British all-time indoor list behind Jane Colebrook, Liz Barnes and Kirsty Wade. She went on to run 2:03.77 to finish fourth at the 1988 UK Championships in June, behind Christina Cahill, Wade and Gandy. At the 1988 AAA Championships/Olympic trials in August 1988, she finished fourth behind Wade, Shireen Bailey and Helen Thorpe.

== Competition record ==
Year	Competition	Venue	Position	Event	Notes
Representing Great Britain
1978	European Championships	Prague, Czechoslovakia	17th (h)	800 m	2:03.7
1987	European Indoor Championships	Lievin, France	7th	800 m	2:05.92
1987	World Indoor Championships	Indianapolis, United States	5th	800 m	2:02.96
1988	European Indoor Championships	Budapest, Hungary	5th	800 m	2:02.70
National Championships
1977	AAA Championships	London, England	3rd	800 m	2:04.88
1978	UK Championships	Edinburgh, Scotland	2nd	800 m	2:04.78
1978	AAA Championships	London, England	2nd	800 m	2:03.11
1979	AAA Championships	London, England	2nd	800 m	2:01.66
1981	AAA Indoor Championships	RAF Cosford, England	3rd	800 m	2:11.5
1986	UK Championships	Cwmbran, Wales	9th (h)	800 m	2:06.79
1986	AAA Championships	Birmingham, England	11th (h)	800 m	2:07.82
1987	AAA Indoor Championships	RAF Cosford, England	1st	800 m	2:04.18
1987	UK Championships	Derby, England	3rd	800 m	2:02.41
1988	AAA Indoor Championships	RAF Cosford, England	2nd	800 m	2:06.01
1988	UK Championships	Derby, England	4th	800 m	2:03.77
1988	AAA Championships	Birmingham, England	4th	800 m	2:??.??
(h) Indicates overall position in qualifying heats
