= Sabine Zwiener =

German middle-distance runner

Personal information
- Born: 5 December 1967 (age 58) Sontheim, West Germany
- Height: 1.72 m (5 ft 8 in)
- Weight: 52 kg (115 lb)

Sport
- Sport: Athletics
- Event: 800 metres
- Club: SV Neckarsulm; LG VfB/Kickers Stuttgart

Sabine Beate Zwiener (born 5 December 1967, in Sontheim) is a retired German middle-distance runner who specialised in the 800 metres. She won the gold medal at the 1988 European Indoor Championships and silver at the 1990 European Indoor Championships. She competed at the 1992 Summer Olympics and 1993 World Championships.

Her personal bests in the event are 1:59.33 outdoors (Düsseldorf 1988) and 2:01.19 indoors (Budapest 1988).

== International competitions ==
Year	Competition	Venue	Position	Event	Notes
Representing West Germany
1985	European Junior Championships	Cottbus, East Germany	3rd	400 m hurdles	57.78
1985	European Junior Championships	Cottbus, East Germany	1st	4 × 400 m relay	3:32.67
1988	European Indoor Championships	Budapest, Hungary	1st	800 m	2:01.19
1990	European Indoor Championships	Glasgow, United Kingdom	2nd	800 m	2:02.23
Representing Germany
1992	Olympic Games	Barcelona, Spain	13th (sf)	800 m	2:02.64
1993	World Championships	Stuttgart, Germany	13th (sf)	800 m	2:00.77
