= 1986 World Junior Championships in Athletics – Women's 1500 metres =

The women's 1500 metres event at the 1986 World Junior Championships in Athletics was held in Athens, Greece, at Olympic Stadium on 19 and 20 July.

== Medalists ==
Gold	Ana Padurean; Romania
Silver	Selina Chirchir; Kenya
Bronze	Snežana Pajkić; Yugoslavia

== Results ==
=== Final ===
20 July

Rank	Name	Nationality	Time	Notes
1st place, gold medalist(s)	Ana Padurean	Romania	4:14.63	
2nd place, silver medalist(s)	Selina Chirchir	Kenya	4:15.59	
3rd place, bronze medalist(s)	Snežana Pajkić	Yugoslavia	4:16.03	
4	Susanne Fischer	East Germany	4:16.69	
5	Donika Hanxhara	Albania	4:21.01	
6	Monica Magnusson	Sweden	4:21.02	
7	Anette Karlsson	Sweden	4:21.15	
8	Simona Staicu	Romania	4:22.78	
9	Suzy Favor Hamilton	United States	4:23.83	
10	Oksana Yakovleva	Soviet Union	4:26.37	
11	Andrea Stuart	New Zealand	4:26.65	
12	Anila Mekshi	Albania	4:27.18	
13	Caroline Jeorgakopoulos	West Germany	4:28.05	
14	Larisa Tretyukhina	Soviet Union	4:33.30	
	Maiken Sørum	Norway	DNF	

=== Heats ===
19 July

==== Heat 1 ====
Rank	Name	Nationality	Time	Notes
1	Snežana Pajkić	Yugoslavia	4:28.13	Q
2	Anette Karlsson	Sweden	4:28.45	Q
3	Ana Padurean	Romania	4:28.46	Q
4	Oksana Yakovleva	Soviet Union	4:28.67	Q
5	Anila Mekshi	Albania	4:28.91	q
6	Yvonne van der Kolk	Netherlands	4:29.15	
7	Susannah Beck	United States	4:33.74	
8	Selma Khardani	Tunisia	4:36.18	
9	Marcelina Piran	Indonesia	4:41.93	
10	Beena Peter	India	4:43.57	
11	Puseletso Monkoe	Lesotho	4:46.21	
12	Lorie Ann Adams	Guyana	4:57.86	

==== Heat 2 ====
Rank	Name	Nationality	Time	Notes
1	Selina Chirchir	Kenya	4:28.76	Q
2	Monica Magnusson	Sweden	4:29.27	Q
3	Simona Staicu	Romania	4:29.86	Q
4	Maiken Sørum	Norway	4:30.74	Q
5	Angela Luchetti	Australia	4:31.53	
6	Hassiba Boulmerka	Algeria	4:32.55	
7	Wendy Wright	United Kingdom	4:34.39	
8	Missy McCleary	Canada	4:35.40	
9	Maribel Silvestre	Dominican Republic	4:41.86	
10	Angelines Rodríguez	Spain	4:47.52	
11	Mireille Sankaatsing	Suriname	4:55.20	

==== Heat 3 ====
Rank	Name	Nationality	Time	Notes
1	Suzy Favor Hamilton	United States	4:25.05	Q
2	Donika Hanxhara	Albania	4:25.07	Q
3	Susanne Fischer	East Germany	4:25.30	Q
4	Andrea Stuart	New Zealand	4:25.30	Q
5	Larisa Tretyukhina	Soviet Union	4:26.75	q
6	Caroline Jeorgakopoulos	West Germany	4:26.97	q
7	Anastasía Giannákou	Greece	4:29.23	
8	Heather Ostic	Canada	4:32.13	
9	Susanne Nedergaard	Denmark	4:37.95	
10	Zenabu Mahama	Ghana	4:38.39	
11	Lieketseng Mpopelle	Lesotho	4:50.43	
12	Bertine Tré Gogo	Côte d'Ivoire	4:50.67	

== Participation ==
According to an unofficial count, 35 athletes from 28 countries participated in the event.

- Albania (2)
- Algeria (1)
- Australia (1)
- Canada (2)
- Côte d'Ivoire (1)
- Denmark (1)
- Dominican Republic (1)
- East Germany (1)
- Ghana (1)
- Greece (1)
- Guyana (1)
- India (1)
- Indonesia (1)
- Kenya (1)
- Lesotho (2)
- Netherlands (1)
- New Zealand (1)
- Norway (1)
- Romania (2)
- Soviet Union (2)
- Spain (1)
- Suriname (1)
- Sweden (2)
- Tunisia (1)
- United Kingdom (1)
- United States (2)
- West Germany (1)
- Yugoslavia (1)
