= Paula Fryer =

English middle-distance runner

Personal information
- Nationality: British (English)
- Born: 14 July 1969 (age 57) Leeds, England
- Height: 164 cm (5 ft 5 in)
- Weight: 52 kg (115 lb)

Sport
- Sport: Middle-distance running
- Event: 800 metres
- Club: Sale Harriers Manchester

Paula Tracey Fryer (born 14 July 1969) is an English former middle-distance runner. She represented Great Britain in the women's 800 metres at the 1992 Barcelona Olympics. She also won the UK Championships and AAA Championships 800m titles in 1991 and competed at the 1991 World Championships.

== Biography r ==
Born in Leeds, Fryer was a member of Sale Harriers Manchester. She won the 800 metres title at the AAA Junior Championships in 1986, 1987 and 1988. At the 1988 World Junior Championships in Canada, she ran 2:07.20 in the heats to qualify for the semifinals as a fastest loser, where she was eliminated running 2:09.04.

Fryer reached her peak in 1991. After winning the 800m titles at the AAA Indoor Championships in 2:08.91, and the UK Championships in June in 2:05.43, she achieved her lifetime best in the 800m with 1:59.76 when finishing fourth at the Golden Gala Rome grand prix on 17 July, to become the seventh British woman (after Christina Boxer, Shireen Bailey, Kirsty McDermott, Lorraine Baker, Diane Edwards and Ann Williams) to run under two minutes for 800m. She went on to win the 1991 AAA Championships title ahead of Lorraine Baker in 2:02.19, to earn selection for the 1991 World Championships in Tokyo, where she was eliminated in the heats in 2:04.64.

Fryer finished second in 2:01.07 behind Diane Edwards at the 1992 AAA Championships/Olympic trials, to earn selection for the 1992 Olympic Games in Barcelona, where she was eliminated in the heats running 2:02.72.

== International competitions ==
Year	Competition	Venue	Position	Event	Notes
Representing Great Britain
1988	World Junior Championships	Sudbury, Canada	14th (sf)	800 m	2:09.04
1988	World Junior Championships	Sudbury, Canada	9th (h)	4 × 400 m	3:42.36
1991	World Championships	Tokyo, Japan	25th (h)	800 m	2:04.64
1992	Olympic Games	Barcelona, Spain	25th (h)	800 m	2:02.74
(#) Indicates overall position in qualifying heats (h) or semifinals (sf)
