= Alan Drayton =

British athlete

Personal information
- Nationality: British (English)
- Born: September 1951 (age 74–75) Winchester, Hampshire, England

Sport
- Sport: Athletics
- Event: decathlon
- Club: Southampton and Eastleigh AAC
Medal record
Athletics
Representing England
Commonwealth Games
Bronze medal – third place	1978 Edmonton	decathlon

Alan Walter Drayton (born September 1951), is a male former athlete who competed for England.

A section of the B3037, running between Eastleigh and Fair Oak in Hampshire, United Kingdom, was named "Alan Drayton Way" in recognition of his athletic achievements.

== Biography ==
Drayton, born in Winchester, Hampshire, England, finished second behind Mike Corden in the decathlon event at the 1974 AAA Championships.

He became the British decathlon champion after winning the British AAA Championships at the 1978 AAA Championships. Shortly afterwards he represented England and won a bronze medal in the decathlon, at the 1978 Commonwealth Games in Edmonton, Canada.
