= Graham Savory =

British discus thrower and shot putter

Personal information
- Nationality: British (English)
- Born: 11 October 1960 (age 65) Aldershot, Hampshire

Sport
- Sport: Athletics
- Event(s): Discus and shot put
- Club: Blackheath Harriers

Graham Charles Savory (born 11 October 1960), is a male former athlete who competed for England.

== Biography ==
Savory was twice British discus throw champion after winning the 1986 UK Athletics Championships and 1989 UK Athletics Championships. He was also twice a silver medal winner at the AAA Championships.

He represented England in the discus and shot put events, at the 1986 Commonwealth Games in Edinburgh, Scotland. Four years later he represented England in the discus event, at the 1990 Commonwealth Games in Auckland, New Zealand.
