= Slobodanka Čolović =

Croatian middle-distance runner

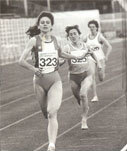

Personal information
- Born: Slobodanka Čolović-Maričić; 10 January 1965 (age 61) Čepin, SR Croatia, SFR Yugoslavia
- Height: 1.76 m (5 ft 9 in)
- Weight: 59 kg (130 lb)

Sport
- Sport: Athletics
- Event: 800 metres
- Club: Slavonija
Medal record
Women's Athletics
Representing Yugoslavia
European Indoor Championships
Bronze medal – third place	1986 Madrid	800 m
Mediterranean Games
Silver medal – second place	1983 Casablanca	800 m
Bronze medal – third place	1983 Casablanca	4x400 m
Gold medal – first place	1987 Latakia	800 m
Universiade
Gold medal – first place	1987 Zagreb	800 m

Slobodanka Čolović-Maričić (born 10 January 1965 in Čepin) is a retired Yugoslavian middle-distance runner of Serbian descent who specialized in the 800 metres. She represented Yugoslavia at the 1988 Summer Olympics finishing fourth, as well as one outdoor and one indoor World Championships where she also made the final. In addition she won medals at the Mediterranean Games was the 1987 Universiade champion.

== International competitions ==
Year	Competition	Venue	Position	Event	Notes
Representing Yugoslavia
1983	European Junior Championships	Schwechat, Austria	4th	800 m	2:02.47
1983	European Junior Championships	Schwechat, Austria	6th	4 × 400 m relay	3:37.82
1983	Mediterranean Games	Casablanca, Morocco	2nd	800 m	2:07.34
1983	Mediterranean Games	Casablanca, Morocco	3rd	4 × 400 m relay	3:37.87
1985	European Indoor Championships	Piraeus, Greece	5th	800 m	2:06.38
1985	Universiade	Kobe, Japan	8th	800 m	2:03.51
1986	European Indoor Championships	Madrid, Spain	3rd	800 m	2:03.28
1986	European Championships	Stuttgart, West Germany	14th (sf)	800 m	2:02.59
1987	European Indoor Championships	Liévin, France	6th	800 m	2:03.04
1987	World Indoor Championships	Indianapolis, United States	4th	800 m	2:02.33
1987	Universiade	Zagreb, Yugoslavia	1st	800 m	1:56.88
1987	World Championships	Rome, Italy	8th	800 m	2:02.09
1987	Mediterranean Games	Latakia, Syria	1st	800 m	2:00.94
1988	European Indoor Championships	Budapest, Hungary	4th	800 m	2:02.34
1988	Olympic Games	Seoul, South Korea	4th	800 m	1:57.50
1990	European Championships	Split, Yugoslavia	17th (h)	800 m	2:01.95

== Personal bests ==
Outdoor

- 400 metres – 52.32 (Sarajevo 1988)
- 800 metres – 1:56.51 (Belgrade 1987)
- 1500 metres – 4:09.14 (Celje 1987)
- 3000 metres – 9:19.70 (Belgrade 1989)

Indoor

- 800 metres – 1:59.83 (Budapest 1987)
