= Lynne Robinson =

English middle-distance runner

Personal information
- Born: 21 June 1969 (age 57) Birmingham, West Midlands, Great Britain

Sport
- Sport: Track and field
Medal record
Representing Great Britain
Summer Universiade
Gold medal – first place	1993 Buffalo	1500 m
European Junior Championships
Bronze medal – third place	1985 Cottbus	4x400m relay

Lynne Elizabeth Duval (née Robinson, born 21 June 1969) is an English former middle-distance runner. She finished fourth in the 800 metres final at the 1986 World Junior Championships and went on to win the 1500 metres title at the 1993 Universiade.

== Career ==
A member of Coventry Godiva Harriers, Robinson was a successful junior who won the AAA Under 17 800 m title in 1984 and 1985, and finished fourth in the 800 metres final at the 1986 World Junior Championships in 2:02.18. Her best time for the 800 m was achieved on 26 July 1989 in Wythenshawe, when she ran 2:02.0.

Robinson won the 1992 UK Championships 800m title, narrowly defeating Coventry Godiva clubmate, Lorraine Baker, 2:04.47 to 2:04.52, and went on to finish fourth in the 800 m final at the 1992 AAA Championships/Olympic trials. The highlight of her career came when she won the 1500 metres title at the 1993 Universiade in Buffalo, New York, in a time of 4:12.03. Her 1500m best of 4:10.32 was set on 30 July 1994 in Hechtel.

Robinson has a PhD in Social History from Warwick University (1997) and is a lecturer at the University of Northampton.

== International competitions ==
Year	Competition	Venue	Position	Event	Notes
Representing Great Britain
1985	European Junior Championships	Cottbus, Germany	15th (sf)	800 m	2:13.35
1985	European Junior Championships	Cottbus, Germany	3rd	4 × 400 m	3:35.10
1986	World Junior Championships	Athens, Greece	4th	800 m	2:02.18
1987	European Junior Championships	Birmingham, United Kingdom	6th	800 m	2:05.14
1991	Universiade	Sheffield, United Kingdom	6th	1500 m	4:13.40
1993	Universiade	Buffalo, United States	1st	1500 m	4:12.03
(sf) Indicates overall position in semifinal round
