= Nigel Spratley =

English male athlete

Nigel Spratley (born 1 April 1970) is an English athlete who competes in the shot put. He has a personal best distance of 17.96 metres.

== Athletics career ==
Spratley competed at the 1994 Commonwealth Games in Victoria, Canada, finishing in 7th place with his personal best performance. He also won a bronze medal at the 1991 UK Championships with a distance of 16.99 metres.
