= David Nelson (hurdler) =

English hurdler

Personal information
- Nationality: British (English)
- Born: 11 March 1967 (age 59) Wolverhampton, England

Sport
- Sport: Athletics
- Event: Hurdles
- Club: Wolverhampton & Bilston AC
Medal record
Athletics
Representing England
Commonwealth Games
Bronze medal – third place	1990 Auckland	110 m hurdles

David Lloyd Nelson (born 11 March 1967) is a male English former hurdler who competed in the 110 metres hurdles.

== Biography ==
Nelson won a bronze medal for England, at the 1990 Commonwealth Games, and went on to achieve his career-best time of 13.42 secs in the heats of the 1991 World Championships, to qualify for the semifinals. This performance still ranks him in the UK all-time top ten. He also represented England, at the 1990 Commonwealth Games in Auckland, New Zealand.

Nelson became the British 110 metres champion after winning the British AAA Championships title at the 1991 AAA Championships and the 110m hurdles titles at the 1991 UK Championships.

== International competitions ==
Year	Competition	Venue	Position	Notes
Representing England
1986	Commonwealth Games	Edinburgh, United Kingdom	7th	13.97
1990	Commonwealth Games	Auckland, New Zealand	3rd	13.54
Representing Great Britain
1991	World Championships	Tokyo, Japan	10th (sf)	13.67 (13.42)
(sf) Indicates overall position in semifinals
