= Selina Chirchir =

Kenyan middle-distance runner and marathoner

Personal information
- Born: August 28, 1968 (age 58)

Sport
- Sport: Track and field
Medal record
Representing Kenya
World Junior Championships
Gold medal – first place	1986 Athens	800 m
Silver medal – second place	1986 Athens	1500 m
African Championships
Gold medal – first place	1982 Cairo	4×400 m
Gold medal – first place	1985 Cairo	800 m
Silver medal – second place	1985 Cairo	4×400 m
African Games
Gold medal – first place	1987 Nairobi	800 m
Gold medal – first place	1987 Nairobi	1500 m

Selina Chirchir Kimaiyo (born August 28, 1968) is a retired Kenyan middle-distance and marathon runner. She competed at the 1984 Summer Olympics while still a schoolgirl at the Sing'ore Girls' Secondary School in Iten.

She won women's 800 metres at the 1986 World Junior Championships in Athletics and finished second in 1500 metres. The next year she won two gold medals (800 and 1500 metres) at the 1987 All-Africa Games, held in Nairobi, Kenya. At the 1987 World Championships she failed to make the final. At the 1996 Summer Olympics she represented Kenya at marathon, but did not finish. Her marathon record, 2:32:36, was run at the Houston Marathon in January, 1996.

In 1998, she won the San Francisco Marathon. She was still active in 2000 when she won the Trinidad and Tobago Marathon.

== International competitions ==
Year	Competition	Venue	Position	Event	Notes
Representing Kenya
1986	World Junior Championships	Athens, Greece	1st	800m	2:01.40
1986	World Junior Championships	Athens, Greece	2nd	1500m	4:15.59
1987	All-Africa Games	Nairobi, Kenya	1st	800 m	2:03.22
1987	All-Africa Games	Nairobi, Kenya	1st	1500 m	4:13.91
1995	Corrida de Langueux	Langueux, France	1st	10 km	
1996	Olympic Games	Atlanta, United States	—	Marathon	DNF
1998	San Francisco Marathon	San Francisco, United States	1st	Marathon	2:45:36
