= Michael Rosswess =

British sprinter (born 1965)

Personal information
- Nationality: British (English)
- Born: 11 June 1965 (age 60) Dudley, Worcestershire, England
- Height: 186 cm (6 ft 1 in)
- Weight: 73 kg (161 lb)

Sport
- Sport: Athletics
- Event: Sprints
- Club: Birchfield Harriers

Michael Rupert Rosswess (born 11 June 1965) is an English retired sprinter who competed at the 1988 Summer Olympics.

== Biography ==
Rosswess represented Great Britain and reached the final of the 200 metres event at the 1988 Olympic Games in Seoul, where he finished in seventh place.

Rosswess finished second behind Jon Drummond at the 1991 AAA Championships and became the British 200 metres champion by virtue of being the highest placed British athlete in the event. Also in 1991, he reached the semi-finals of the 200 metres at the World Championships.

Rosswess was a bronze medalist in the 60 metres sprint at the European Athletics Indoor Championships on three occasions (in 1989, 1992 and 1994). His personal best time for the event was 6.58 seconds (set in 1989).

Outdoors, Rosswess' personal best times were 10.07 seconds for 100 metres (set in 1994), and 20.51 seconds for 200 metres (set in 1988).

== International competitions ==
Year	Competition	Venue	Position	Event	Notes
Representing Great Britain
1988	Olympic Games	Seoul, South Korea	7th	200 m	
1989	European Indoor Championships	The Hague, Netherlands	3rd	60 m	
1992	European Indoor Championships	Genoa, Italy	3rd	60 m	
1994	European Indoor Championships	Paris, France	3rd	60 m	
