= Nataliya Vorobyova (sprinter) =

Kazakhstani sprinter

Personal information
- Nationality: Kazakhstani
- Born: 15 November 1972 (age 52)

Sport
- Sport: Sprinting
- Event: 100 metres

Nataliya Vorobyova (born 15 November 1972) is a Kazakhstani sprinter. She competed in the women's 100 metres at the 1996 Summer Olympics.
