= Patrizia Di Napoli =

Italian long-distance runner

Personal information
- Nationality: Italian
- Born: 27 September 1969 (age 56)

Sport
- Country: Italy
- Sport: Athletics
- Event: Long-distance running

Achievements and titles
- Personal best: Half marathon: 1:16:48 (2001)

Patrizia Di Napoli (born 27 September 1969) is a former Italian female long-distance runner who competed at two editions of the IAAF World Cross Country Championships at senior level (1996, 1998). She won one national championships at senior level (cross country running: 2006).
