= Southampton Athletic Club =

Athletics club based in Southampton, England

- Founded: 2010
- Ground: Southampton Athletics Track
- Location: Thornhill Road, Southampton SO16 7AY, England
- Coordinates: 50°56′30″N 1°25′06″W
- Website: official website

Southampton Athletic Club (Southampton AC) is an athletics club based in Southampton, England. It is based at the Southampton Sports Centre. It's men compete in the British Athletics League National Division One and women in UK Women's Athletic League Division 1. The club also completes in the Southern Athletics League.

== History ==
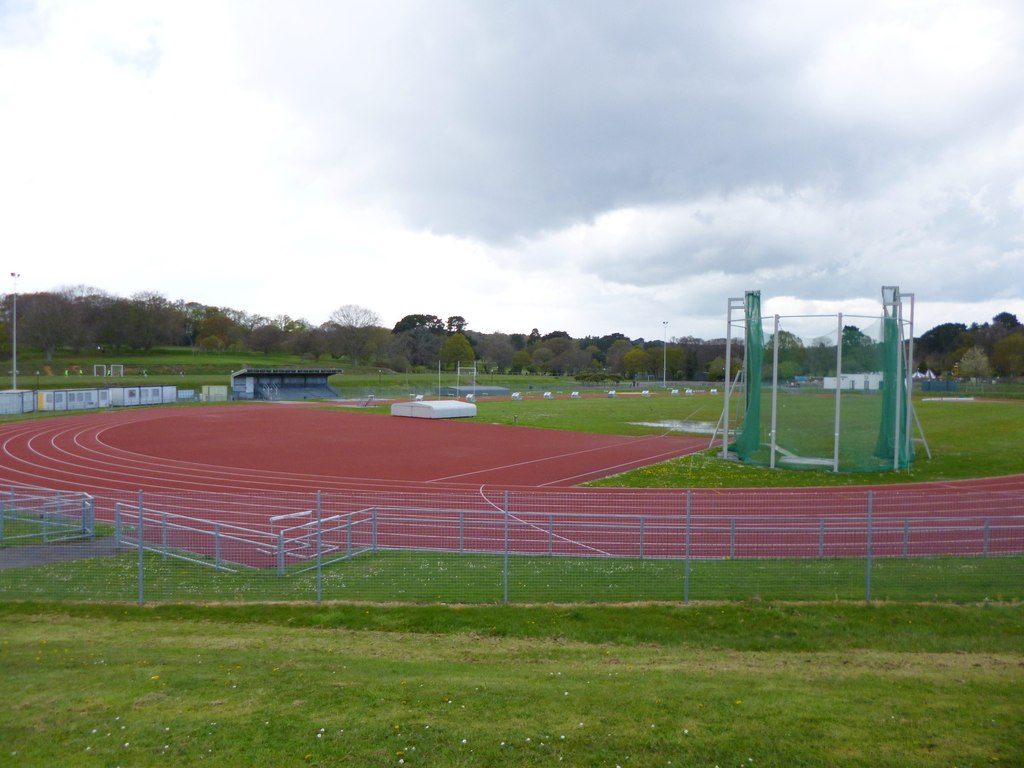
The Athletics Track in 2012

The origins of the club have been littered with various clubs and amalgamations, starting with the creation of two clubs; the Southampton Amateur Athletic Club (founded in 1880) and the Southampton Harriers (believed to be founded in 1884 based on their second annual sport event in 1885).

The two clubs merged in 1893 to become the Hampshire Amateur Athletic Club, with the annual sports events taking place at Westwood Park but due to confusion with the Hampshire Amateur Athletic Association the club reverted back to the name of Southampton Amateur Athletic Club on 15 February 1932. A ladies section was added on 14 December 1949.

On 1 December 1970 the club amalgamated with Eastleigh A.A.C. to become the Southampton and Eastleigh A.A.C., followed by Southampton City AC in circa.1988, around the same time that a new club called Team Solent were founded.

In November 2004 Southampton City merged with Team Solent, resulting in another name change to Team Southampton. One final amalgamation took place on 1 April 2010, this time with Southampton Running Club to form the present day name.

== Notable athletes ==
=== Olympians ===
Athlete	Club	Events	Games	Medals/Ref
Harry Simmons	Southampton AAC	high jump	1928	
Dave Dear	Southampton & Eastleigh A.A.C.	4 × 100 m relay	1972	
Donna Hartley	Southampton & Eastleigh A.A.C.	200 m, 400 m, 4 × 400 m relay	1972, 1976, 1980	Bronze medal
Christine Benning	Southampton & Eastleigh A.A.C.	1500 metres	1984	
Todd Bennett	Southampton & Eastleigh A.A.C. Team Solent	400 m, 4 × 400 m relay	1984, 1988	Silver medal
Kriss Akabusi	Southampton & Eastleigh A.A.C. Team Solent	400 m, 4 × 400 m relay	1984, 1988, 1992	Silver medal Bronze medal Bronze medal
Paul Harmsworth	Team Solent	4 × 400 m relay	1988	
Roger Black	Southampton & Eastleigh A.A.C. Team Solent	400 m, 4 × 400 m relay	1992, 1996	Silver medal Silver medal Bronze medal
Mahamed Mahamed	Southampton AC	marathon	2024	

=== Commonwealth Games ===
Athlete	Club	Events	Games	Medals/Ref
Alan Drayton	Southampton & Eastleigh A.A.C.	decathlon	1978	
Dawn Gandy	Southampton & Eastleigh A.A.C.	800 m	1994	
Melanie Purkiss	Team Solent	4 × 400 m	2002	Silver medal
Grace Clements	Southampton AC	heptathlon	2010	
