= Peter McColgan =

Northern Irish athlete

Personal information
- Nationality: Northern Irish
- Born: 20 February 1963 (age 63) Strabane, County Tyrone, Northern Ireland

Sport
- Sport: Athletics
- Event: Steeplechase

Peter Conor McColgan (born 20 February 1963) is a Northern Irish former steeplechaser.

== Biography ==
McColgan was born in Strabane, County Tyrone, and was educated at Omagh CBS. He only took up athletics at the age of 17 and was coached until 1986 by Malcolm McCausland.

McColgan holds the Northern Irish 3000 metres indoor record with a time of 7:54.48, as well as the two- (5:31.09) and three-km (8:27.93) steeplechase outdoor records.

McColgan was an All-American runner for the Alabama Crimson Tide track and field team, finishing 3rd in the 3000 m steeplechase at the 1986 NCAA Division I Outdoor Track and Field Championships.

McColgan represented Northern Ireland at the 1986 Commonwealth Games in Edinburgh and was a finalist in the 3000 metre steeplechase and 5000 metres.

He also ran for Great Britain in the steeplechase at the 1991 World Championships in Athletics in Japan and among his other accomplishments are a bronze medal in the 3000 metres steeplechase at the NCAA Championships (1986) in the United States and a sub-four-minute mile. He finished third behind Colin Walker at the 1991 AAA Championships.

He has five children with his ex-wife Liz, including athlete Eilish. Peter remarried on 22 Feb 2025 to his long term fiancée Lesley.
