= Snežana Pajkić =

Yugoslav middle-distance runner

Medal record

Women's athletics

Representing Yugoslavia

European Championships
Gold medal – first place	1990 Split	1500 m

Mediterranean Games
Silver medal – second place	1987 Latakia	800 m

Snežana Pajkić-Jolović (born 23 September 1970, in Ćuprija, SR Serbia, Yugoslavia) is a former middle-distance runner from Serbia. She won the gold medal for Yugoslavia in the women's 1500 metres at the 1990 European Athletics Championships in a Yugoslav record. Pajkić represented her country at the 1991 World Championships in Athletics. She also took a silver medal in the 800 metres at the Mediterranean Games.

She was a two-time 1500 m champion at the European Athletics Junior Championships and was twice a medallist in that event at the IAAF World Junior Championships in Athletics.

== International competitions ==
Year	Competition	Venue	Position	Event	Notes
Representing SFR Yugoslavia
1986	World Junior Championships	Athens, Greece	7th	800m	2:07.75
1986	World Junior Championships	Athens, Greece	3rd	1500m	4:16.03
1986	European Championships	Stuttgart, West Germany	17th (h)	1500m	4:13.76
1986	European Championships	Stuttgart, West Germany	18th (h)	3000m	9:07.44
1987	European Junior Championships	Birmingham, United Kingdom	1st	1500 m	4:16.09
1987	Mediterranean Games	Latakia, Syria	2nd	800 m	2:02.91
1988	World Junior Championships	Sudbury, Canada	6th	800m	2:07.56
1988	World Junior Championships	Sudbury, Canada	2nd	1500m	4:16.19
1989	European Junior Championships	Varaždin, Yugoslavia	1st	1500 m	4:13.34
1990	European Championships	Split, Yugoslavia	1st	1500m	4:08.12
1990	European Championships	Split, Yugoslavia	—	3000m	DNF
1991	World Championships	Tokyo, Japan	26th (h)	1500 m	4:14.20

== Personal bests ==
- 800 metres: 2:01.78 (1991)
- 1500 metres: 4:08.12 (1990)
- 3000 metres: 9:07.44 (1986)

== See also ==
- Serbian records in athletics
