= Tatyana Grebenchuk =

Medal record

Women's athletics

Representing the Soviet Union

World Indoor Championships
Silver medal – second place	1989 Budapest	800 m

European Indoor Championships
Bronze medal – third place	1989 The Hague	800 m

Tatyana Grebenchuk (Belarusian: Тацяна Грабянчук; born 22 November 1962) is a Belarusian former Soviet track and field athlete who specialised in the 800 metres. She was a medalist at the IAAF World Indoor Championships and European Athletics Indoor Championships in 1989. Her 800 m personal best was 1:57.35 minutes.

Grebenchuk's career briefly flourished in 1989 and 1990. She emerged as a fast runner in her mid-twenties after running a best of 1:57.89 minutes in 1987 (ranked twelfth globally) and then 1.58.70 minutes in 1988 (ranked 25th). Her first and only national title came at the 1989 Soviet Indoor Athletics Championships, where she topped the podium in 2:02.62 minutes. International success followed: the 1989 European Athletics Indoor Championships saw her place third in the 800 m behind Romania's Doina Melinte and East Germany's Ellen Kiessling. Shortly after she entered the 1989 IAAF World Indoor Championships and retained her good form by running a lifetime indoor best of 1:59.53 minutes. This was enough to hold off Kiessling for the silver medal, as she finished second behind East German Christine Wachtel. The time ranked her as the second fastest athlete indoors that year.

There were no major outdoor championships in 1989, but she expanded her international success to the outdoor track the year after. She ran a lifetime best of 1:57.35 minutes in Kiev that July. She gained selection for the 1990 Goodwill Games – billed as a major event between American and Soviet athletes. There she earned a bronze medal in the 800 m (behind Cuba's Ana Fidelia Quirot and future world champion Liliya Nurutdinova) as well as a 4×400 metres relay bronze with the Soviet "B" team of Nadezhda Loboyko, Nadezhda Olizarenko and Nurutdinova. Her final international outing was at the 1990 European Athletics Championships, but her semi-final run was slower than her heats one and she was eliminated, ranking tenth in the semi-final round.

== Personal bests ==
- 800 metres – 1:57.35 min (1990)
- 800 meters (indoor) – 1:59.53 min (1989)

== National titles ==
- Soviet Indoor Athletics Championships
  - 800 m: 1989

== International competitions ==
Year	Competition	Venue	Position	Event	Notes
1989	European Indoor Championships	The Hague, Netherlands	3rd	800 m	2:01.63
1989	World Indoor Championships	Budapest, Hungary	2nd	800 m	1:59.53
1990	Goodwill Games	Seattle, United States	3rd	800 m	1:58.21
1990	Goodwill Games	Seattle, United States	3rd	4×400 m relay	3:30.60
1990	European Championships	Split, Yugoslavia	10th (semis)	800 m	2:01.43
