= Renée Belanger =

Canadian middle-distance runner

Personal information
- Born: 12 September 1962 (age 63) Lambton, Québec, Canada
- Height: 157 cm (5 ft 2 in)
- Weight: 47 kg (104 lb)

Sport
- Country: Canada
- Sport: Middle-distance running
- Event: 800 metres

Renée Belanger (born 12 September 1962) is a Canadian middle-distance runner. She competed in the women's 800 metres at the 1988 Summer Olympics.
