= Gabriela Sedláková =

Slovak track and field athlete

Personal information
- Born: 2 March 1968 (age 58) Topoľčany, Czechoslovakia

Sport
- Sport: Track and field
Medal record
Representing Czechoslovakia
World Indoor Championships
Silver medal – second place	1987 Indianapolis	800 m

Gabriela Sedláková (born 2 March 1968) is a Slovak former track and field athlete who competed for Czechoslovakia in the 800 metres. She was the silver medallist in that event at the 1987 IAAF World Indoor Championships. Earlier she had been European junior champion and World junior runner-up.

Sedláková represented Czechoslovakia at the 1987 World Championships in Athletics and 1986 European Athletics Championships. She was twice a finalist at the European Athletics Indoor Championships. Her 800 m bests of 1:58.37 minutes outdoors and 2:01.85 minutes indoors remain the Slovak records for the distance. She was a seven-time Czechoslovak national champion.

== Career ==
Born in Topoľčany (now in Slovakia), she emerged as a teenager at the 1985 European Athletics Junior Championships, where she shared in the 800 m title with Maria Pintea – the pair ended the race in a dead heat of 2:03.22 minutes. A second international medal followed at the 1986 World Junior Championships in Athletics the year after, where she ran a new best of 2:01.49 minutes to secure the silver medal behind Kenya's Selina Chirchir. She made her senior debut at the 1986 European Athletics Championships and ran a best of 2:00.61 minutes, but failed to make the final.

Still in the junior ranks in the 1987 season, she established herself at senior level. She won her first national title in the 800 m at the Czechoslovak Indoor Athletics Championships. This gained her selection for the 1987 European Athletics Indoor Championships and she made her first senior final, coming fourth and being beaten to a medal by Soviet runner Lyubov Kiryukhina. She also made the 800 m final at the World Indoor Championships held shortly after and a new indoor personal best of 2:01.85 minutes was a European junior record. It was also enough for a silver medal behind Christine Wachtel of East Germany. She was the first Czechoslovak woman to win a medal at the competition – only Ivana Kubešová joined her in that feat before the country's dissolution. Sedláková's European junior record lasted almost twenty-seven years before being improved by Iceland's Aníta Hinriksdóttir in 2014.

Going into the 1987 outdoor season, Sedláková won her first outdoor title at the Czechoslovak Athletics Championships. Her winning time of 2:00.42 minutes was another new best and the third-fastest ever winning time at the competition (only Jozefína Čerchlanová and Jarmila Kratochvílová had run faster). One week before the 1987 World Championships in Athletics she raised herself as a possible contender with another best at the Internationales Stadionfest meet in West Berlin, running 1:58.37 minutes. This proved to be her lifetime best and ultimately ranked her 15th globally on time that year. At the championships in Rome she narrowly missed the final, coming fourth in her semi-final.

She made only one further appearance in major international competition, running at the 1988 European Athletics Indoor Championships, at which she placed sixth. Her nation career continued to be successful, as she defended her indoor/outdoor Czechoslovak double in 1988, then won outdoors in 1989 and 1991. However, she never again reached her peak times. Her final national honour was a win in 1992 at the Czechoslovak Indoor Championships.

Following her retirement, her records were incorporated into the Slovak national record books and she remains the national record holder indoors and outdoors for the 800 m.

== Personal bests ==
- 400 metres – 53.60 min (1986)
- 800 metres – 1:58.37 min (1987)
- 1500 metres – 4:15.18 min (1989)
- 400 metres indoor – 55.28 min (1986)
- 800 metres indoor – 2:01.85 min (1987)

== National titles ==
- Czechoslovak Athletics Championships
  - 800 m: 1987, 1988, 1989, 1991
- Czechoslovak Indoor Athletics Championships
  - 800 m: 1987, 1988, 1992

== International competitions ==
Year	Competition	Venue	Position	Event	Notes
Representing Czechoslovakia
1985	European Junior Championships	Cottbus, East Germany	1st	800 m	2:03.22
1986	World Junior Championships	Athens, Greece	2nd	800 m	2:01.49
1986	European Championships	Stuttgart, West Germany	5th (semis)	800 m	2:00.61
1987	European Indoor Championships	Liévin, France	4th	800 m	2:02.24
1987	World Indoor Championships	Indianapolis, United States	2nd	800 m	2:01.85
1987	World Championships	Rome, Italy	4th (semis)	800 m	2:02.27
1988	European Indoor Championships	Budapest, Hungary	6th	800 m	2:05.59
