= Hugh Teape =

English athlete (born 1963)

Hughie Teape
Personal information
- Nickname: Hughie
- Born: 26 December 1963 (age 62) Hackney, London, England
- Height: 1.78 m (5 ft 10 in)
- Weight: 73 kg (161 lb)

Sport
- Sport: Athletics
- Events: 110 m hurdles, 60 m hurdles
- Club: Enfield Harriers
- Coached by: John Isaacs

Hugh Desmond Teape (born 26 December 1963) is a male English retired athlete who specialised in the high hurdles. He competed at the 1992 Summer Olympics.

== Biography ==
Teape finished on the podium three times at the British AAA Championships in 1984, 1991 and 1992.

Teape represented Great Britain at the 1992 Summer Olympics in Barcelona, finishing eighth in the final. He represented England in the 110 metres hurdles event, at the 1990 Commonwealth Games in Auckland, New Zealand.

His personal bests are 13.44 seconds in the 110 metres hurdles (+0.4 m/s, Sheffield 1992) and 7.69 seconds in the 60 metres hurdles (Glasgow 1992).

== International competitions ==
Year	Competition	Venue	Position	Event	Notes
Representing Great Britain and England
1990	European Indoor Championships	Glasgow, United Kingdom	14th (h)	60 m hurdles	7.83
1990	Commonwealth Games	Auckland, New Zealand	4th	110 m hurdles	13.58
1992	European Indoor Championships	Genoa, Italy	6th (sf)	60 m hurdles	7.75
1992	Olympic Games	Barcelona, Spain	8th	110 m hurdles	14.00
1994	European Indoor Championships	Paris, France	15th (sf)	60 m hurdles	7.77
