= Cristieana Cojocaru =

Romanian runner (born 1962)

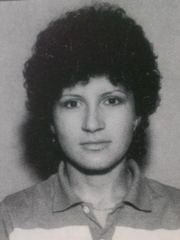

Personal information
- Born: 2 January 1962 (age 64) Cujmir, Romania
- Height: 172 cm (5 ft 8 in)
- Weight: 62 kg (137 lb)

Sport
- Sport: Athletics
- Event(s): 400 m hurdles, 800 m
- Coached by: Mihai Nistor

Achievements and titles
- Personal best(s): 400 mH – 54.55 (1986); 800 m – 2:04.22 (1985i)
Medal record
Representing Romania
Olympic Games
Bronze medal – third place	1984 Los Angeles	400 m hurdles
World Indoor Games
Gold medal – first place	1985 Paris	800 m
European Athletics Indoor Championships
Bronze medal – third place	1984 Gotheburg	800 m
Bronze medal – third place	1985 Piraeus	800 m
Silver medal – second place	1986 Madrid	800 m
Summer Universiade
Silver medal – second place	1985 Kobe	400 m hurdles
Silver medal – second place	1985 Kobe	800 m

Cristieana Cojocaru (later Matei, born 2 January 1962) is a retired Romanian runner who specialized in the 400 m hurdles and flat 800 m events. She won a bronze medal in the hurdles at the 1984 Olympics. In the 800 m she won the 1985 world indoor title and three medals at the European indoor championships in 1984–1986.
