= Anne Purvis =

Scottish middle-distance runner

Anne Purvis née Clarkson
Personal information
- Nationality: British (Scottish)
- Born: 5 March 1959 (age 67) Edinburgh, Scotland

Sport
- Sport: Athletics
- Event: middle distance
- Club: Edinburgh Southern Harriers
Medal record
Representing Scotland
Commonwealth Games
Silver medal – second place	1982 Brisbane	800m
Bronze medal – third place	1982 Brisbane	4x400m relay

Anne Rosemary Purvis (née Clarkson; born 5 March 1959) is a Scottish former athlete who specialised in the 800 metres. She won a silver medal in the 800 metres at the 1982 Commonwealth Games and finished fourth in the 800m final at the 1986 Commonwealth Games. She also won the AAAs Championship title in 1980 and 1981, and the UK Championships title in 1982 and 1986.

== Biography ==
Clarkson, became the British 800 metres champion after winning the British WAAA Championships title at the 1980 WAAA Championships in a time of 2:01.89. The following year she retained her title at the 1981 WAAA Championships in a time of 2:03.92.

In 1982, she won the UK Championship title in 2:03.6 in May. Two months later, she ran her lifetime best for the 800m with 2:00.20 on 7 July 1982 in Oslo. This narrowly missed the then Scottish record of 2:00.15 by Rosemary Stirling from 1972. Later that year, she won a silver medal in the 800m at the 1982 Commonwealth Games in Brisbane, behind another Scots-born athlete, Kirsty McDermott, who was representing Wales. She also won a bronze medal in the 4x400m relay with teammates Linsey MacDonald, Angela Bridgeman and Sandra Whittaker.

As Anne Purvis, she finished second to Shireen Bailey at the 1983 WAAA Championships in 1983, and second behind Christina Boxer at the 1985 WAAA Championships. She won her second UK Championship title in May 1986, running 2:01.63 to defeat Helen Thorpe and Lorraine Baker. In July 1986, she finished fourth in the 800m final at the Commonwealth Games in Edinburgh, behind Kirsty Wade, Diane Edwards and Lorraine Baker. She was second to Edwards at the 1987 AAA Championships.

As of 2021, Purvis ranks sixth on the Scottish all-time list for 800 m, behind Laura Muir, Jemma Reekie, Lynsey Sharp, Susan Scott and Rosemary Stirling.

== Competition record ==
Year	Competition	Venue	Position	Event	Notes
Representing Great Britain
1982	European Championships	Athens, Greece	semifinal	800 m	2:00.34
1983	European Cup	London, United Kingdom	7th	800 m	2:03.66
Representing Scotland
1982	Commonwealth Games	Brisbane, Australia	2nd	800 m	2:01.52
1982	Commonwealth Games	Brisbane, Australia	3rd	4x400 m	3:32.92
1986	Commonwealth Games	Edinburgh, United Kingdom	4th	800 m	2:02.17
1986	Commonwealth Games	Edinburgh, United Kingdom	4th	4x400 m	3:42.86
National Championships
1980	AAA Championships	London, England	1st	800 m	2:01.89
1981	AAA Championships	London, England	1st	800 m	2:03.92
1982	UK Championships	Cwmbran, Wanles	1st	800 m	2:03.6
1983	AAA Championships	London, England	2nd	800 m	2:00.74
1984	AAA Championships	London, England	3rd	800 m	2:02.98
1985	AAA Championships	Birmingham, England	2nd	800 m	2:02.41
1986	UK Championships	Cwmbran, Wales	1st	800 m	2:01.63
1987	AAA Championships	Birmingham, England	2nd	800 m	2:04.40
