= AAA Indoor Championships =

Annual indoor track and field competition

- Sport: Indoor track and field
- Founded: 1935
- Folded: 2006
- Country: England/United Kingdom

The AAA Indoor Championships was an annual indoor track and field competition organised by the Amateur Athletic Association of England. It was the foremost indoor domestic athletics event during its lifetime.

The event was first held in 1935, following the construction of an adequate venue in Wembley Arena in London for the 1934 British Empire Games. The first iteration of the competition lasted for five editions and featured around nine men's indoor track and field events and six for women. The onset of World War II meant the competition was not held in 1940. The second iteration of the competition began in 1962, returning to its Wembley venue. The championships had a long residency at RAF Cosford indoor arena from 1965 to 1991, then from 1992 to 2001 at the National Indoor Arena in Birmingham. The final few editions for held at the English Institute of Sport, Sheffield. The event ceased in 2006, being replaced by the UK Athletics-organised British Indoor Athletics Championships.

Though organised by the English governing body, it was open to all athletes from the United Kingdom, and also to overseas athletes. (Most of the foreign athletes who competed were Irish or UK-based.) It served as the de facto British Championships, given the absence of such a competition during its history. It was typically held over two days over a weekend in February.

It was among the earliest and most significant annual indoor track and field competitions, being preceded only by the AAU Indoor Track and Field Championships in the United States (established in 1907). The restarting of the AAA Indoor Championships in 1962 came alongside similar national developments elsewhere, including the German Indoor Championships in 1954 and Soviet Indoors in 1964. The European Athletics Indoor Championships became the first regular indoor international championship in 1966.

== Events ==
The following athletics events featured as standard on the main AAA Championships programme:

- Sprint: 60 m, 200 m, 400 m
- Distance track events: 800 m, 1500 m, 3000 m
- Hurdles: 60 m hurdles
- Jumps: long jump, triple jump, high jump, pole vault
- Throws: shot put

Events were initially raced and measured in imperial distances, with the transition to metric occurring in 1968 for men and 1969 for women. A men's 2000 metres steeplechase was contested from 1967 to 1985. Combined track and field events were introduced in 1987 in the form of a men's octathlon and a women's pentathlon; the octathlon was amended to the international standard men's heptathlon in 1991. Racewalking briefly featured on the programme, with a men's and women's 3000 metres track walk happening from 1997 to 2002. A women's 1.5 mile walk was also held in 1966 and 1967. and a men's 1-mile walk in 1936. The non-standard 600-yard run was held for both men and women from 1962 to 1964.

In line with the international expansion of women's athletics programmes to match the men's, the 3000 metres for women was added in 1973, the triple jump was added in 1991 and the pole vault in 1994.

== Editions ==
#	Year	Date	Venue	Location	Notes
	1935		Wembley Arena	London	
	1936		Wembley Arena	London	
	1937		Wembley Arena	London	
	1938		Wembley Arena	London	
	1939		Wembley Arena	London	
Not held 1940 to 1945 due to World War II
	1962		Wembley Arena	London	
	1963		Wembley Arena	London	
	1964		Wembley Arena	London	
	1965		Cosford Indoor Area	RAF Cosford	
	1966		Cosford Indoor Area	RAF Cosford	
	1967		Cosford Indoor Area	RAF Cosford	
	1968		Cosford Indoor Area	RAF Cosford	
	1969		Cosford Indoor Area	RAF Cosford	
	1970		Cosford Indoor Area	RAF Cosford	
	1971		Cosford Indoor Area	RAF Cosford	
	1972		Cosford Indoor Area	RAF Cosford	
	1973		Cosford Indoor Area	RAF Cosford	
	1974		Cosford Indoor Area	RAF Cosford	
	1975		Cosford Indoor Area	RAF Cosford	
	1976		Cosford Indoor Area	RAF Cosford	
	1977		Cosford Indoor Area	RAF Cosford	
	1978		Cosford Indoor Area	RAF Cosford	
	1979		Cosford Indoor Area	RAF Cosford	
	1980		Cosford Indoor Area	RAF Cosford	
	1981		Cosford Indoor Area	RAF Cosford	
	1982		Cosford Indoor Area	RAF Cosford	
	1983		Cosford Indoor Area	RAF Cosford	
	1984		Cosford Indoor Area	RAF Cosford	
	1985		Cosford Indoor Area	RAF Cosford	
	1986		Cosford Indoor Area	RAF Cosford	
	1987		Cosford Indoor Area	RAF Cosford	
	1988		Cosford Indoor Area	RAF Cosford	
	1989		Cosford Indoor Area	RAF Cosford	
	1990		Cosford Indoor Area	RAF Cosford	
	1991		Cosford Indoor Area	RAF Cosford	
	1992		National Indoor Arena	Birmingham	
	1993		National Indoor Arena	Birmingham	Heptathlon and pentathlon held at RAF Cosford
	1994		National Indoor Arena	Birmingham	Heptathlon and pentathlon held at RAF Cosford
	1995		National Indoor Arena	Birmingham	
	1996		National Indoor Arena	Birmingham	
	1997		National Indoor Arena	Birmingham	
	1998		National Indoor Arena	Birmingham	
	1999		National Indoor Arena	Birmingham	
	2000		National Indoor Arena	Birmingham	
	2001		National Indoor Arena	Birmingham	
	2002	2–3 February	National Indoor Athletics Centre	Cardiff	
	2003		National Indoor Arena	Birmingham	Heptathlon and pentathlon held at NIAC Cardiff
	2004	11–12 February	English Institute of Sport	Sheffield	Heptathlon and pentathlon held at NIAC Cardiff
	2005		English Institute of Sport	Sheffield	Heptathlon and pentathlon held at NIAC Cardiff
	2006	7–8 February	English Institute of Sport	Sheffield	

== Most successful athletes by event ==
Event	Men	Men's titles	Women	Women's titles
60 metres	Jason Gardener	5	Beverly Kinch	5
200 metres	Linford Christie	6	Ciara Sheehy (IRL)	3
400 metres	Jim Aukett	4	Verona Elder	8
800 metres	Martin Steele	4	Kirsty Wade	4
1500 metres	Walter Wilkinson Rob Harrison	2	Mary Stewart Hayley Ovens	3
3000 metres	Ian Stewart Ray Smedley	3	Mary Stewart Thelwyn Bateman Sonia McGeorge Angela Davies Zara Hyde Peters Jo Pavey	2
60 m hurdles	Colin Jackson	7	Lorna Boothe Lesley-Ann Skeete	4
2000 m steeplechase	Ron McAndrew	4	Not contested	—
High jump	Geoff Parsons	5	Susan Moncrieff	7
Pole vault	Mike Bull	8	Janine Whitlock	7
Long jump	Chris Tomlinson	4	Sheila Parkin Sue Reeve Kim Hagger Denise Lewis Joanne Wise	3
Triple jump	Aston Moore Francis Agyepong Julian Golley	4	Michelle Griffith	5
Shot put	Geoff Capes Mike Winch Paul Edwards	6	Judy Oakes	18
Heptathlon/pentathlon	John Heanley	3	Kelly Sotherton	3
3000 m walk	Robert Heffernan (IRL)	3	Gillian O'Sullivan (IRL)	3
