= Gabriela Lesch =

German middle-distance runner

Personal information
- Born: 17 August 1964 (age 61) Sulzbach, Hesse, West Germany

Sport
- Sport: Track and field
Medal record
Representing West Germany
European Indoor Championships
Bronze medal – third place	1988 Budapest	800m
Summer Universiade
Silver medal – second place	1989 Duisburg	800m
Representing Germany
Summer Universiade
Silver medal – second place	1991 Sheffield	4x400m relay

Gabriela Katharina "Gabi" Lesch (born 17 August 1964) is a retired German runner who specialized in the 800 metres. She represented West Germany at the 1988 Seoul Olympics.

She represented the sports clubs TSV Kirchhain and Eintracht Frankfurt, and became West German champion in 1988, 1989 and 1990. Her personal best time was 1:59.24 minutes, achieved in June 1991 in Helsinki.

== International competitions ==
Year	Competition	Venue	Position	Notes
1988	European Indoor Championships	Budapest, Hungary	3rd	2:01.85
1988	Olympic Games	Seoul, South Korea	semi-final	1:59.85
1989	European Indoor Championships	The Hague, Netherlands	5th	2:03.04
1989	World Indoor Championships	Budapest, Hungary	5th	2:01.09
1990	European Championships	Split, Yugoslavia	semi-final	2:02.01
1991	World Indoor Championships	Seville, Spain	semi-final	2:02.68
1991	Universiade	Sheffield, United Kingdom	2nd	2:00.97
1992	World Cup	Havana, Cuba	5th	2:03.66
