= Lorraine Baker =

English former middle-distance runner

Personal information
- Nationality: British (English)
- Born: 4 May 1964 (age 62) Ipswich, Suffolk, England
- Height: 160 cm (5 ft 3 in)
- Weight: 46 kg (101 lb)

Sport
- Sport: Athletics
- Event: middle distance
- Club: Coventry Godiva Harriers
Medal record
Athletics
Representing England
Commonwealth Games
Bronze medal – third place	1986 Edinburgh	800 metres
Representing Great Britain
European Indoor Championships
Bronze medal – third place	1990 Glasgow	800 metres

Lorraine Baker, married name Strain (born 9 April 1964) is an English former middle-distance runner who competed in the 800 metres. She represented Great Britain at the Olympic Games in Los Angeles 1984 and Barcelona 1992. In Los Angeles, she finished fifth in the final. She also won bronze medals at the 1986 Commonwealth Games in Edinburgh and the 1990 European Indoor Championships in Glasgow.

== Biography ==
Baker was born in Ipswich, Suffolk, England, and was a member of the Coventry Godiva Harriers. A talented junior, she won the AAAs National under-15 800 metres title in 1978 and the Under 17 title in both 1979 and 1980. In 1981, at the European Junior Championships, she finished fifth in the final in 2:07.39.

Baker finished second behind Anne Clarkson in the 800 metres event at the 1981 WAAA Championships and third behind Christina Boxer at the 1982 WAAA Championships.

Later that year in September, Baker represented England at the 1982 Commonwealth Games in Brisbane, Australia, finishing sixth in 2:03.17

At the 1984 Los Angeles Olympics, Baker was the only British representative in the women's 800 metres. She excelled herself by reaching the final, placing fifth in a personal best of 2:00.03, just failing to break the two-minute barrier.

Having come close to breaking the two-minute barrier on a number of occasions, Baker at last succeeded at the Crystal Palace, London in July 1986, when she ran 1:59.99. This made her only the fourth British woman in history to run sub 2 minutes for the 800 metres, after Christina Boxer (1979), Shireen Bailey (1983) and Kirsty McDermott (1985). Two weeks later at the Commonwealth Games in Edinburgh, she won the bronze medal in the 800 metres final in 2:01.79, behind Kirsty Wade and Diane Edwards. In August, she achieved her lifetime best of 1:59.67 at the Berlin grand prix. Two weeks later at the European Championships in Stuttgart, she reached the semi-finals and ran 2:02.03.

Baker then suffered two years of injury problems, before returning to form in 1989 and gaining selection for the 1990 Commonwealth Games, held in New Zealand in January. In Auckland, she finished fifth in the final in 2:01.77. A month later, at the 1990 European Indoor Championships in Glasgow, she ran 2:02.42 to win a bronze medal behind Lyubov Gurina of the Soviet Union and Sabine Zwiener of West Germany. She continued as one of Britains most consistent 800 metre women for the next two years. At the 1991 World Championships in Tokyo, she reached the semi-finals running 2:01.32. In 1992, she qualified for her second Olympics. In the heats of the Barcelona Games, she ran her best time for six years, with 2:00.50, to reach the semi-finals, where she ran 2:02.17. Barcelona proved to be the conclusion of her international career.

Throughout her career, Baker placed second or third 16 times at senior national championships, without ever winning. At the WAAA Championships, she was second three times (1981, 1986, 1991), at the UK Championships she was second three times (1982, 1983, 1992) and at the AAAs Indoors, she was second twice (1981, 1987). As of 2021, her best (1:59.67) ranks 19th on the UK all-time list. Her best as a junior (2:01.66 in Oslo 1982) still ranks fourth on the UK Under 20 all-time list. She also ranks sixth on the UK all-time list at 1000 metres with 2:35.51.

== Personal life ==
Baker is the daughter of American-born Scottish professional footballer Gerry Baker, who earned seven international caps for the USA. Her uncle Joe Baker, was also an International footballer, earning eight England caps between 1959 and 1966. Her son, Ryan Strain, is a footballer with Dundee United FC.

== International competitions ==
All results regarding 800 metres.

Year	Competition	Venue	Position	Notes
Representing Great Britain / England
1981	European Junior Championships	Utrecht, Netherlands	5th	2:07.39
1982	Commonwealth Games	Brisbane, Australia	6th	2:03.17
1984	Olympic Games	Los Angeles, United States	5th	2:00.03
1986	Commonwealth Games	Edinburgh, United Kingdom	3rd	2:01.79
1986	European Championships	Stuttgart, Germany	12th (sf)	2:02.03
1990	Commonwealth Games	Auckland, New Zealand	5th	2:01.77
1990	European Indoor Championships	Glasgow, United Kingdom	3rd	2:02.42
1990	European Championships	Split, Yugoslavia	18th (h)	2:02.04
1991	World Championships	Tokyo, Japan	12th (sf)	2:01.32
1992	Olympic Games	Barcelona, Spain	12th (sf)	2:02.17
(#) Indicates overall position in qualifying heats (h) or semifinals (sf)

=== National championships 800m ===
- AAA Championships 2nd (1981, 1986, 1991) 3rd (1982, 1989, 1990)
- UK Championships 2nd (1982, 1983, 1992) 3rd (1981, 1984, 1986, 1989, + 3rd 1991 1500m)
- AAA Indoor Championships 2nd (1981, 1987)

=== Personal bests ===
- 600 metres — 1:26.97 (1990)
- 800 metres — 1:59.67 (1986)
- 1000 metres — 2:35.51 (1986)
- 1500 metres — 4:11.94 (1990)
