= 1993 World Championships in Athletics – Women's 800 metres =

These are the official results of the Women's 800 metres event at the 1993 IAAF World Championships in Stuttgart, Germany. There were a total number of 37 participating athletes, with five qualifying heats and the final held on Tuesday 1993-08-17.

== Doping disqualification ==
Liliya Nurutdinova (Russia) had originally placed seventh, but was disqualified after testing positive for the anabolic steroid stanozolol.

== Final ==
RANK	FINAL	TIME
	Maria Mutola (MOZ)	1:55.43
	Lyubov Gurina (RUS)	1:57.10
	Ella Kovacs (ROM)	1:57.92
4.	Diane Modahl (GBR)	1:59.42
5.	Meredith Rainey (USA)	1:59.57
6.	Liu Li (CHN)	2:04.45
7.	Tina Paulino (MOZ)	2:19.89
—	Liliya Nurutdinova (RUS)	DSQ

== Semifinals ==
- Held on Sunday 1993-08-15

RANK	HEAT 1	TIME
1.	Maria Mutola (MOZ)	1:58.69
2.	Liu Li (CHN)	1:58.96
3.	Diane Modahl (GBR)	1:59.12
4.	Liliya Nurutdinova (RUS)	1:59.17
5.	Christine Wachtel (GER)	1:59.86
6.	Amy Wickus (USA)	2:00.55
7.	Oksana Mernikova (BLR)	2:01.20
8.	Gladys Wamuyu (KEN)	2:02.13

RANK	HEAT 2	TIME
1.	Tina Paulino (MOZ)	1:57.31
2.	Ella Kovacs (ROM)	1:57.46
3.	Meredith Rainey (USA)	1:57.63
4.	Lyubov Gurina (RUS)	1:57.82
5.	Kelly Holmes (GBR)	1:58.64
6.	Birthe Bruhns (GER)	1:59.66
7.	Sabine Zwiener (GER)	2:00.77
8.	Maria Magnolia Figueiredo (BRA)	2:01.01

== Qualifying heats ==
- Held on Saturday 1993-08-14

RANK	HEAT 1	TIME
1.	Liu Li (CHN)	1:59.60
2.	Lyubov Gurina (RUS)	1:59.90
3.	Christine Wachtel (GER)	2:01.42
4.	Satu Jaaskelainen (FIN)	2:03.66
5.	Carla Sacramento (POR)	2:03.74
6.	Sheila Seebaluck (MRI)	2:10.54
7.	Ablavi Agbenyeke (TOG)	2:23.19
–	Letitia Vriesde (SUR)	DNS

RANK	HEAT 2	TIME
1.	Tina Paulino (MOZ)	2:01.46
2.	Kelly Holmes (GBR)	2:01.70
3.	Natalya Dukhnova (BLR)	2:01.78
4.	Wang Yuan (CHN)	2:02.98
5.	Luciana Mendes (BRA)	2:03.55
6.	Shiny Wilson (IND)	2:06.64
7.	Alia Al Matari (JOR)	2:15.23
8.	Shermaine Ross (GRN)	2:15.84

RANK	HEAT 3	TIME
1.	Diane Modahl (GBR)	2:00.80
2.	Liliya Nurutdinova (RUS)	2:00.85
3.	Amy Wickus (USA)	2:00.91
4.	Sabine Zwiener (GER)	2:01.37
5.	Oksana Mernikova (BLR)	2:01.65
6.	Anna Brzezińska (POL)	2:01.67
7.	Laurence Niyonsaba (RWA)	2:12.52

RANK	HEAT 4	TIME
1.	Ella Kovacs (ROM)	2:01.36
2.	Maria Magnolia Figueiredo (BRA)	2:01.91
3.	Joetta Clark (USA)	2:02.15
4.	Fabia Trabaldo (ITA)	2:02.36
5.	Yelena Storchovaya (UKR)	2:03.50
6.	Edith Nakiyingi (UGA)	2:07.81
7.	Karolina Tanona (FIJ)	2:15.12

RANK	HEAT 5	TIME
1.	Maria Mutola (MOZ)	1:59.81
2.	Meredith Rainey (USA)	1:59.87
3.	Birthe Bruhns (GER)	2:00.29
4.	Gladys Wamuyu (KEN)	2:01.59
5.	Yelena Afanasyeva (RUS)	2:01.94
6.	Lorie Ann Adams (GUY)	2:09.77
7.	Tamador Ismail (SUD)	2:41.51

== See also ==
- 1990 Women's European Championships 800 metres (Split)
- 1991 Women's World Championships 800 metres (Tokyo)
- 1992 Women's Olympic 800 metres (Barcelona)
- 1994 Women's European Championships 800 metres (Helsinki)
- 1995 Women's World Championships 800 metres (Gothenburg)
- 1996 Women's Olympic 800 metres (Atlanta)
