= 1991 World Championships in Athletics – Women's 800 metres =

These are the official results of the Women's 800 metres event at the 1991 IAAF World Championships in Tokyo, Japan. There were a total of 36 participating athletes, with five qualifying heats and the final held on Monday August 26, 1991.

== Medalists ==
Gold	Liliya Nurutdinova; Soviet Union (URS)
Silver	Ana Fidelia Quirot; Cuba (CUB)
Bronze	Ella Kovacs; Romania (ROU)

== Schedule ==
- All times are Japan Standard Time (UTC+9)

Heats
24.08.1991 – 17:35h
Semifinals
25.08.1991 – 19:20h
Final
26.08.1991 – 19:10h

== Final ==
RANK	FINAL	TIME
	Liliya Nurutdinova (URS)	1:57.50
	Ana Fidelia Quirot (CUB)	1:57.55
	Ella Kovacs (ROM)	1:57.58
4.	Maria Mutola (MOZ)	1:57.63
5.	Letitia Vriesde (SUR)	1:58.25
6.	Christine Wachtel (GER)	1:58.90
7.	Ann Williams (GBR)	2:01.01
8.	Svetlana Masterkova (URS)	2:02.92

== Semifinals ==
- Held on Sunday 1991-08-25

RANK	HEAT 1	TIME
1.	Ana Fidelia Quirot (CUB)	2:00.08
2.	Ella Kovacs (ROM)	2:00.13
3.	Liliya Nurutdinova (URS)	2:00.13
4.	Ann Williams (GBR)	2:00.30
5.	Milena Strnadová (TCH)	2:00.47
6.	Maria Magnolia Figueiredo (BRA)	2:01.53
7.	Joetta Clark (USA)	2:02.35
—	Sigrun Wodars-Grau (GER)	DNS

RANK	HEAT 2	TIME
1.	Christine Wachtel (GER)	1:59.10
2.	Letitia Vriesde (SUR)	1:59.15
3.	Svetlana Masterkova (URS)	1:59.15
4.	Maria Mutola (MOZ)	1:59.29
5.	Birte Bruhns (GER)	1:59.93
6.	Charmaine Crooks (CAN)	2:00.63
7.	Lorraine Baker (GBR)	2:01.32
8.	Delisa Walton-Floyd (USA)	2:01.32

== Qualifying heats ==
- Held on Saturday 1991-08-24

RANK	HEAT 1	TIME
1.	Ella Kovacs (ROM)	2:01.06
2.	Ann Williams (GBR)	2:01.44
3.	Maria Magnolia Figueiredo (BRA)	2:01.71
4.	Joetta Clark (USA)	2:01.81
5.	Tuuli Merikoski (FIN)	2:03.84
6.	Gabriella Dorio (ITA)	2:07.54
7.	Nana-Kadidia Thera (MLI)	2:30.77

RANK	HEAT 2	TIME
1.	Svetlana Masterkova (URS)	2:04.52
2.	Charmaine Crooks (CAN)	2:04.60
3.	Meredith Rainey (USA)	2:04.84
4.	Mitica Constantin (ROM)	2:06.53
5.	Sharon Stewart (AUS)	2:08.72
6.	Mantokoane Pitso (LES)	2:24.63
—	Shermaine Ross (GRN)	DNS

RANK	HEAT 3	TIME
1.	Maria Mutola (MOZ)	2:00.86
2.	Ana Fidelia Quirot (CUB)	2:00.88
3.	Sigrun Wodars-Grau (GER)	2:00.99
4.	Maria Akraka (SWE)	2:02.58
5.	Maite Zúñiga (ESP)	2:03.24
6.	Edith Nakiyingi (UGA)	2:08.72
—	Dawn Williams (DMA)	DNS

RANK	HEAT 4	TIME
1.	Delisa Walton-Floyd (USA)	2:00.05
2.	Birte Bruhns (GER)	2:00.11
3.	Liliya Nurutdinova (URS)	2:00.13
4.	Lorraine Baker (GBR)	2:01.22
5.	Ellen van Langen (NED)	2:02.02
6.	Aisling Molloy (IRL)	2:02.31
7.	Sharmaine Williams (TCA)	3:00.97

RANK	HEAT 5	TIME
1.	Christine Wachtel (GER)	2:01.45
2.	Letitia Vriesde (SUR)	2:01.51
3.	Milena Strnadová (TCH)	2:01.95
4.	Inna Yevseyeva (URS)	2:03.09
5.	Tudorita Chidu (ROM)	2:03.81
6.	Elsa Amaral (POR)	2:03.83
7.	Paula Fryer (GBR)	2:04.64
8.	Sylene Blake (MSR)	2:51.71

== See also ==
- 1987 Women's World Championships 800 metres (Rome)
- 1988 Women's Olympic 800 metres (Seoul)
- 1990 Women's European Championships 800 metres (Split)
- 1992 Women's Olympic 800 metres (Barcelona)
- 1993 Women's World Championships 800 metres (Stuttgart)
