= Athletics at the 1997 Summer Universiade – Women's 800 metres =

The women's 800 metres event at the 1997 Summer Universiade was held at the Stadio Cibali in Catania, Italy on 26, 27, and 29 August.

== Medalists ==
Gold	Silver	Bronze
Iryna Nedelenko; Ukraine	Yelena Martson; Ukraine	Mariya Sinusova; Russia

== Results ==
=== Heats ===
Rank	Heat	Athlete	Nationality	Time	Notes
1	2	Mariya Sinusova	Russia	2:03.39	Q
2	2	Ana Menéndez	Spain	2:03.41	Q
3	2	Dorota Fiut	Poland	2:03.51	q
4	2	Marie-Louise Henning	South Africa	2:03.88	q
5	1	Carmen Stanciu	Romania	2:03.98	Q
6	1	Argentina Paulino	Mozambique	2:04.02	Q
7	1	Ana Guevara	Mexico	2:04.35	q
8	2	Samira Raïf	Morocco	2:04.68	q
9	1	Carlien Cornelissen	South Africa	2:05.00	q
10	4	Iryna Nedelenko	Ukraine	2:05.07	Q
11	4	Hayley Parry	Great Britain	2:05.60	Q
12	4	Elisabetta Artuso	Italy	2:05.60	q
13	2	Maura Prendeville	Ireland	2:05.98	
14	5	Mairelin Fuentes	Cuba	2:06.18	Q
15	5	Stephanie Graf	Austria	2:06.45	Q
16	2	Marjana Zajfrid	Slovenia	2:06.69	
17	3	Yelena Martson	Ukraine	2:06.70	Q
18	5	Julian Reynolds	United States	2:06.77	
19	5	Jurga Marcinkevičiūtė	Lithuania	2:06.88	
20	4	Jeannette Castro	Mexico	2:06.92	
21	3	Sandra Dawson	Australia	2:07.11	Q
22	3	Jeina Mitchell	Great Britain	2:07.35	
23	4	María Pilar Barreiro	Spain	2:07.54	
24	1	Kumiko Okamoto	Japan	2:09.07	
25	3	Hilary Bruening	United States	2:09.17	
26	5	Veslemøy Hausken	Norway	2:09.92	
27	5	Célia dos Santos	Brazil	2:10.07	
28	1	Rikke Rønholt	Denmark	2:10.13	
29	3	Susana Rebolledo	Chile	2:10.54	
30	3	Miriam Mašeková	Slovakia	2:11.52	
31	2	Andrea da Silva	Brazil	2:11.66	
32	4	Sandra Moya	Puerto Rico	2:12.65	
33	3	Anna Anfinogentova	Latvia	2:12.93	
34	5	Natalia Cercheș	Moldova	2:17.25	
35	1	Rita Pattipeilohy	Indonesia	2:19.33	

=== Semifinals ===
Rank	Heat	Athlete	Nationality	Time	Notes
1	2	Iryna Nedelenko	Ukraine	2:03.61	Q
2	2	Hayley Parry	Great Britain	2:03.95	Q
3	2	Argentina Paulino	Mozambique	2:04.09	Q
4	2	Mariya Sinusova	Russia	2:04.20	Q
5	2	Dorota Fiut	Poland	2:04.25	
6	2	Sandra Dawson	Australia	2:04.34	
7	1	Ana Guevara	Mexico	2:04.96	Q
8	1	Yelena Martson	Ukraine	2:04.98	Q
9	1	Ana Menéndez	Spain	2:05.12	Q
10	1	Carmen Stanciu	Romania	2:05.14	Q
11	1	Stephanie Graf	Austria	2:05.33	
12	2	Carlien Cornelissen	South Africa	2:05.55	
13	1	Mairelin Fuentes	Cuba	2:05.91	
14	1	Marie-Louise Henning	South Africa	2:06.30	
15	1	Samira Raïf	Morocco	2:07.51	
16	2	Elisabetta Artuso	Italy	2:10.40	

=== Final ===
Rank	Athlete	Nationality	Time	Notes
1st place, gold medalist(s)	Iryna Nedelenko	Ukraine	2:00.21	
2nd place, silver medalist(s)	Yelena Martson	Ukraine	2:00.84	
3rd place, bronze medalist(s)	Mariya Sinusova	Russia	2:01.38	
4	Ana Menéndez	Spain	2:01.63	
5	Hayley Parry	Great Britain	2:02.47	
6	Ana Guevara	Mexico	2:02.90	
7	Argentina Paulino	Mozambique	2:03.22	
8	Carmen Stanciu	Romania	2:03.74	
