= 1995–96 Australian Athletics Championships =

- Dates: 7–10 March 1996
- Host city: Sydney, Australia
- Venue: Sydney Olympic Park Athletic Centre
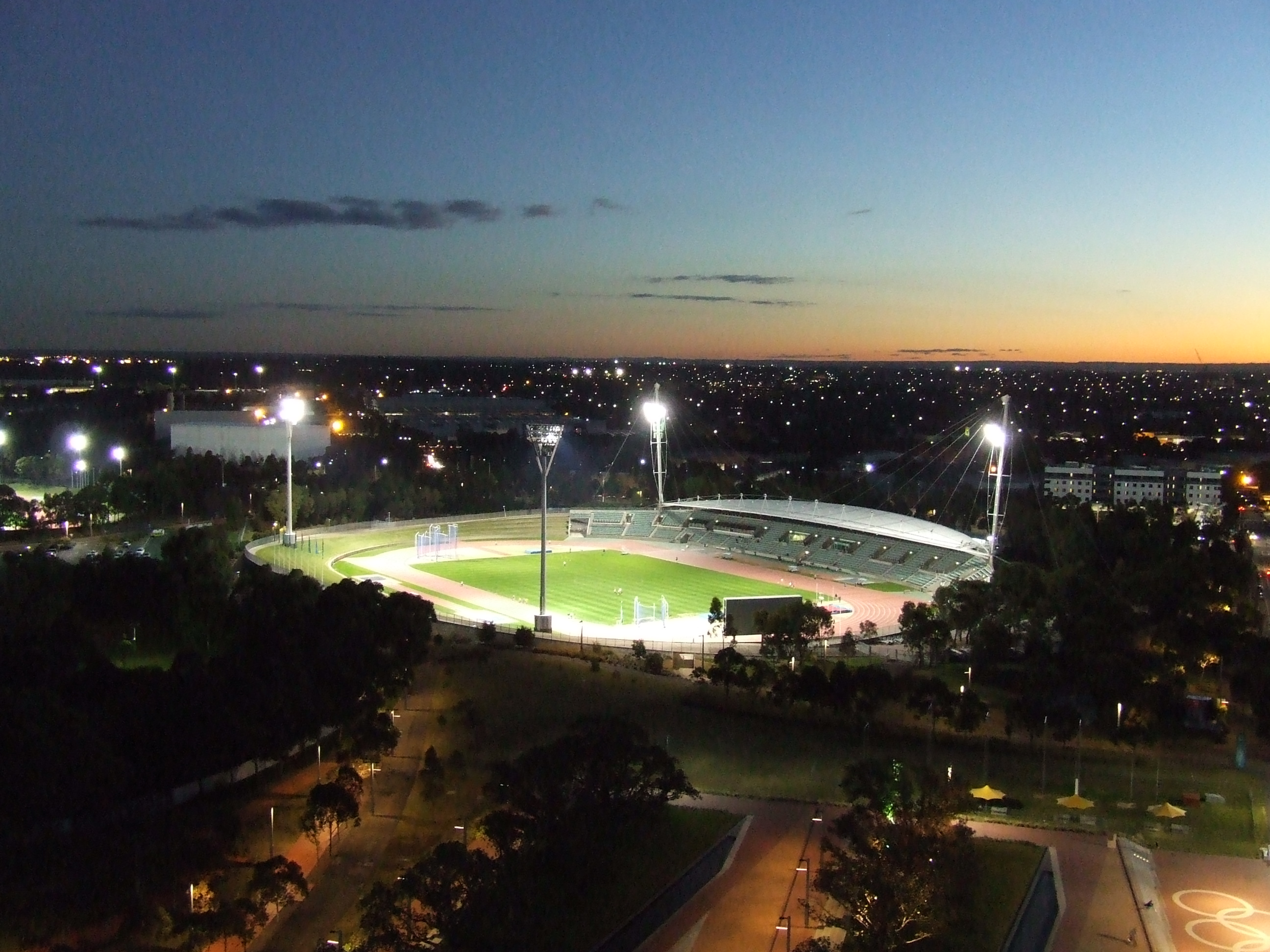

The 1995–96 Australian Athletics Championships was the 74th edition of the national championship in outdoor track and field for Australia. It was held from 7–10 March 1996 at the Sydney Olympic Park Athletic Centre in Sydney. It served as a selection meeting for Australia at the 1996 Summer Olympics. The 10,000 metres event took place separately at the Zatopek 10K on 14 December 1995 at Lakeside Stadium in Melbourne.

== Medal summary ==
=== Men ===
| Event | Gold | | Silver | | Bronze | |
|---|---|---|---|---|---|---|
| 100 metres (Wind: - 1.7 m/s) | Damien Marsh; Queensland | 10.48 | Rod Mapstone; Western Australia | 10.52 | Dean Capobianco; Western Australia | 10.54 |
| 200 metres (Wind: - 0.7 m/s) | Dean Capobianco; Western Australia | 20.79 | Mark Ladbrook; Victoria | 21.11 | Darryl Wohlsen; Queensland | 21.26 |
| 400 metres | Jamie Baulch; Great Britain (GBR) | 45.71 | Mark Ladbrook; Victoria | 45.78 | Paul Greene; Western Australia | 46.15 |
| 800 metres | Sammy Langat; Kenya (KEN) | 1:47.35 | Heath Fitzpatrick; Queensland | 1:47.63 | Martin Byron; New South Wales | 1:47.98 |
| 1500 metres | Paul Bitok; Kenya (KEN) | 3:40.94 | Paul Cleary; Victoria | 3:41.83 | Darren Lynch; Victoria | 3:42.32 |
| 5000 metres | David Kibet; Kenya (KEN) | 13:38.48 | Shaun Creighton; Australian Capital Territory | 13:39.00 | Robbie Johnston; New Zealand (NZL) | 13:40.44 |
| 10,000 metres | Joseph Kimani; Kenya (KEN) | 27:38.52 | Shaun Creighton; Australian Capital Territory | 27:46.87 | Steve Moneghetti; Victoria | 27:48.94 |
| 110 metres hurdles (Wind: - 1.6 m/s) | Kyle Vander-Kuyp; Victoria | 13.54 | Paul Gray; Great Britain (GBR) | 13.80 | David Cooper; Western Australia | 14.27 |
| 400 metres hurdles | Rohan Robinson; Victoria | 49.62 | Simon Hollingsworth; Tasmania | 50.12 | Zaid Abu Hamed; New South Wales | 50.52 |
| 3000 metres steeplechase | Chris Unthank; Victoria | 8:32.66 | Phillip Cashey; New Zealand (NZL) | 8:44.94 | Scott Faulkner; Victoria | 8:49.05 |
| 5000 metres walk | Nicholas A'Hern; New South Wales | 19:23.18 | Brent Vallance; New South Wales | 19:30.63 | Scott Nelson; New Zealand (NZL) | 19:42.28 |
| High jump | Christopher Anderson; Western Australia | 2.27 m | Tim Forsyth; Victoria | 2.23 m | Yoshiteru Kaihoko; Japan (JPN) | 2.19 m |
| Pole vault | James Miller; Western Australia | 5.70 m | Simon Arkell; South Australia | 5.40 m | Brett Styles; Western Australia | 5.40 m |
| Long jump | Jai Taurima; Queensland | 7.92 m (+1.0 m/s) | Aaron Langdon; New Zealand (NZL) | 7.86 m (+1.9 m/s) | Craig Furber; Victoria | 7.75 m (+0.9 m/s) |
| Triple jump | Andrew Murphy; Victoria | 17.07 m (+1.8 m/s) | Peter Burge; New South Wales | 16.03 m (+1.9 m/s) | John MacKenzie; Western Australia | 15.68 m (+1.6 m/s) |
| Shot put | Pavol Pankuch; Slovakia (SVK) | 17.95 m | Clay Cross; New South Wales | 17.53 m | John Gorddard; Western Australia | 17.50 m |
| Discus throw | Justin Anlezark; Queensland | 53.92 m | Peter Lonsdale; Queensland | 53.56 m | Christopher Mene; New Zealand (NZL) | 53.32 m |
| Hammer throw | Sean Carlin; South Australia | 75.18 m | Stuart Rendell; Australian Capital Territory | 72.32 m | Peter Vivian; Great Britain (GBR) | 68.62 m |
| Javelin throw | Andrew Currey; New South Wales | 79.54 m | Nick Batty; New South Wales | 74.86 m | Adrian Hatcher; Victoria | 72.12 m |
| Decathlon | Peter Winter; Western Australia | 8084 pts | Scott Ferrier; Victoria | 8037 pts | James Fitzpatrick; Western Australia | 7236 pts |
| 4 × 100 m relay | South Australia; South Australia (SA); Ramon Varcoe; Steve Hutton; Damien Byrne; James Noblet | 40.37 | Victoria; Victoria (VIC); Ashley Rowan; Peter Crane; Nick Rennie; Tim Goldie | 40.69 | New South Wales; New South Wales (NSW); Adam Ross; Mike Weiner; Andrew Richardson; Robert Medlicott | 40.74 |
| 4 × 400 m relay | New Zealand; New Zealand (NZL); Callum Taylor; Robert Hanna; Nick Cowan; Shaun Farrell | 3:06.09 | Queensland; Queensland (QLD); Anthony Ryan; Eugene Farrell; Darryl Wohlsen; Chris Carroll | 3:06.81 | Western Australia; Western Australia (WA); Jason Schmidberger; Paul Greene; Declan Stack; Manesh Pillay | 3:07.17 |

=== Women ===
| Event | Gold | | Silver | | Bronze | |
|---|---|---|---|---|---|---|
| 100 metres (Wind: - 1.4 m/s) | Cathy Freeman; Victoria | 11.72 | Lauren Hewitt; Victoria | 11.85 | Sharon Cripps; Queensland | 11.89 |
| 200 metres (Wind: - 2.1 m/s) | Cathy Freeman; Victoria | 22.89 | Jodi Lambert; Western Australia | 23.73 | Lauren Hewitt; Victoria | 23.77 |
| 400 metres | Renee Poetschka; Western Australia | 50.60 | Sandie Richards; Jamaica (JAM) | 51.41 | Lee Naylor; Victoria | 52.11 |
| 800 metres | Lisa Lightfoot; Victoria | 2:02.28 | Sandra Dawson; Queensland | 2:02.50 | Melanie Collins; Australian Capital Territory | 2:02.51 |
| 1500 metres | Margaret Crowley; Victoria | 4:10.35 | Elizabeth Miller; New South Wales | 4:17.03 | Geraldine Nolan; Ireland (IRL) | 4:17.61 |
| 5000 metres | Kate Anderson; Victoria | 15:30.97 | Carolyn Schuwalow; Victoria | 15:32.43 | Natalie Harvey; Victoria | 15:33.53 |
| 10,000 metres | Nyla Carroll; New Zealand (NZL) | 32:01.68 | Lisa Ondieki; Australian Capital Territory | 32:18.29 | Kate Anderson; Victoria | 32:38.27 |
| 100 metres hurdles (Wind: - 1.1 m/s) | Samantha Farquharson; Great Britain (GBR) | 13.68 | Nicole Gale; New South Wales | 13.95 | Sally Heagney; Western Australia | 14.07 |
| 400 metres hurdles | Rebecca Campbell; Western Australia | 57.28 | Lauren Poetschka; Western Australia | 57.54 | Saidat Onanuga; Nigeria (NGR) | 58.28 |
| 5000 metres walk | Kerry Saxby- Junna; New South Wales | 20:47.5h | Natalie Saville; New South Wales | 21:47.1h | Anne Manning; New South Wales | 22:01.8h |
| High jump | Lea Haggett; Western Australia | 1.88 m | Alison Inverarity; Western Australia | 1.84 m | Belinda Blay; Victoria | 1.80 m |
| Pole vault | Melissa Harris; New South Wales | 3.60 m | Melina Hamilton; New Zealand (NZL) | 3.60 m | Sarelle Verkade; New Zealand (NZL) | 3.60 m |
| Long jump | Chantal Brunner; New Zealand (NZL) | 6.66 m (+2.7 m/s) | Nicole Boegman; New South Wales | 6.63 m (+3.3 m/s) | Joanne Henry; New Zealand (NZL) | 6.46 m (+3.5 m/s) |
| Triple jump | Shelley Stoddart; New Zealand (NZL) | 13.15 m (+2.2 m/s) | Nicole Mladenis; Western Australia | 12.85 m (+2.4 m/s) | Carmen Miller; Tasmania | 12.83 m (+2.4 m/s) |
| Shot put | Georgette Reed; Canada (CAN) | 16.39 m | Bernadette Serone; New South Wales | 15.33 m | Daniela Costian; Queensland | 15.29 m |
| Discus throw | Lisa-Marie Vizaniari; Queensland | 61.86 m | Beatrice Faumuina; New Zealand (NZL) | 60.98 m | Daniela Costian; Queensland | 60.04 m |
| Hammer throw | Olga Kuzenkova; Russia (RUS) | 64.38 m | Deborah Sosimenko; New South Wales | 59.50 m | Aya Suzuki; Japan (JPN) | 58.86 m |
| Javelin throw | Tanja Damaske; Germany (GER) | 64.38 m | Joanna Stone; Queensland | 62.78 m | Louise McPaul; New South Wales | 59.70 m |
| Heptathlon | Jane Jamieson; New South Wales | 5823 pts | Sherryl Morrow; Victoria | 5002 pts | Virginia Young; New South Wales | 4872 pts |
| 4 × 100 m relay | Western Australia; Western Australia (WA); Gillian Ragus; Jane Ovenden; Jodie Lambert; Kylie Reed | 45.31 | New South Wales; New South Wales (NSW); Veronica Lee; Melissa Medlicott; Kristy French; Rachael Massey | 45.42 | New Zealand; New Zealand (NZL); Jane Arnott; Shelley Stoddart; Caro Hunt; Chantal Brunner | 46.78 |
| 4 × 400 m relay | New South Wales; New South Wales (NSW); Kylie Robertson; Amber Menzies; Rosemary Hayward; Kylie Hanigan | 3:34.68 | Western Australia; Western Australia (WA); Rebecca Campbell; Patricia Starling; Renee Poetschka; Lauren Poetschka | 3:35.22 | Queensland; Queensland (QLD); Karla Law; Sandra Dawson; Alice Barrett; Saleena Roberts | 3:39.61 |
