= 1990 European Athletics Championships – Women's 800 metres =

Women's 800 metres at the European Athletics Championships

These are the official results of the Women's 800 metres event at the 1990 European Championships in Split, Yugoslavia, held at Stadion Poljud on 27, 28, and 29 August 1990.

== Medalists ==
Gold	Sigrun Wodars; East Germany
Silver	Christine Wachtel; East Germany
Bronze	Liliya Nurutdinova; Soviet Union

== Results ==
=== Final ===
29 August

Rank	Name	Nationality	Time	Notes
1st place, gold medalist(s)	Sigrun Wodars	East Germany	1:55.87	
2nd place, silver medalist(s)	Christine Wachtel	East Germany	1:56.11	
3rd place, bronze medalist(s)	Liliya Nurutdinova	Soviet Union	1:57.39	
4	Ellen van Langen	Netherlands	1:57.57	
5	Ella Kovacs	Romania	1:58.33	
6	Tudorița Chidu	Romania	1:59.09	
7	Lyubov Gurina	Soviet Union	1:59.59	
8	Diane Edwards	United Kingdom	2:02.62	

=== Semi-finals ===
28 August

==== Semi-final 1 ====
Rank	Name	Nationality	Time	Notes
1	Sigrun Wodars	East Germany	2:01.03	Q
2	Ellen van Langen	Netherlands	2:01.14	Q
3	Tudorița Chidu	Romania	2:01.22	Q
4	Tatyana Grebenchuk	Soviet Union	2:01.43	
5	Birte Bruhns	East Germany	2:01.70	
6	Gabi Lesch	West Germany	2:02.01	
7	Ann Williams	United Kingdom	2:03.36	
8	Aisling Molloy	Ireland	2:04.20	

==== Semi-final 2 ====
Rank	Name	Nationality	Time	Notes
1	Christine Wachtel	East Germany	1:59.60	Q
2	Ella Kovacs	Romania	1:59.65	Q
3	Liliya Nurutdinova	Soviet Union	1:59.91	Q
4	Lyubov Gurina	Soviet Union	1:59.98	q
5	Diane Edwards	United Kingdom	2:00.17	q
6	Aurica Mitrea	Romania	2:00.75	
7	Elsa Amaral	Portugal	2:01.49	
8	Mayte Zúñiga	Spain	2:01.81	

=== Heats ===
27 August

==== Heat 1 ====
Rank	Name	Nationality	Time	Notes
1	Sigrun Wodars	East Germany	2:00.31	Q
2	Lyubov Gurina	Soviet Union	2:00.47	Q
3	Ella Kovacs	Romania	2:00.54	Q
4	Ellen van Langen	Netherlands	2:00.69	Q
5	Elsa Amaral	Portugal	2:01.21	q
6	Aurica Mitrea	Romania	2:01.44	q
7	Lorraine Baker	United Kingdom	2:02.04	

==== Heat 2 ====
Rank	Name	Nationality	Time	Notes
1	Tudorița Chidu	Romania	2:01.62	Q
2	Liliya Nurutdinova	Soviet Union	2:01.63	Q
3	Diane Edwards	United Kingdom	2:01.65	Q
4	Birte Bruhns	East Germany	2:01.94	Q
5	Nicoleta Tozzi	Italy	2:02.65	
6	Maria Akraka	Sweden	2:02.83	
7	Theresia Kiesl	Austria	2:06.44	

==== Heat 3 ====
Rank	Name	Nationality	Time	Notes
1	Christine Wachtel	East Germany	2:00.82	Q
2	Tatyana Grebenchuk	Soviet Union	2:00.94	Q
3	Mayte Zúñiga	Spain	2:01.13	Q
4	Aisling Molloy	Ireland	2:01.14	Q
5	Ann Williams	United Kingdom	2:01.22	q
6	Gabi Lesch	West Germany	2:01.49	q
7	Slobodanka Čolović	Yugoslavia	2:01.95	

== Participation ==
According to an unofficial count, 21 athletes from 13 countries participated in the event.

- Austria (1)
- East Germany (3)
- Ireland (1)
- Italy (1)
- Netherlands (1)
- Portugal (1)
- Romania (3)
- Soviet Union (3)
- Spain (1)
- Sweden (1)
- United Kingdom (3)
- West Germany (1)
- Yugoslavia (1)

== See also ==
- 1988 Women's Olympic 800 metres (Seoul)
- 1991 Women's World Championships 800 metres (Tokyo)
- 1992 Women's Olympic 800 metres (Barcelona)
