= Athletics at the 1994 Commonwealth Games – Women's 800 metres =

Women's 800 metres at the Commonwealth Games

The women's 800 metres event at the 1994 Commonwealth Games was held at the Centennial Stadium in Victoria, British Columbia.

== Medalists ==
Gold	Silver	Bronze
Inez Turner; Jamaica	Charmaine Crooks; Canada	Gladys Wamuyu; Kenya

== Results ==
=== Heats ===
Rank	Heat	Name	Nationality	Time	Notes
1	1	Inez Turner	Jamaica	2:03.14	Q
2	1	Gladys Wamuyu	Kenya	2:03.37	Q
3	3	Selina Kosgei	Kenya	2:03.38	Q
4	3	Melanie Collins	Australia	2:03.57	Q
5	1	Sandra Dawson	Australia	2:03.71	q
5	2	Charmaine Crooks	Canada	2:03.71	Q
7	3	Cathy Dawson	Wales	2:03.81	q
8	2	Lisa Lightfoot	Australia	2:03.90	Q
9	2	Julia Sakara	Zimbabwe	2:04.60	
10	2	Joanna Latimer	Northern Ireland	2:05.19	
11	3	Vicky Lynch	Canada	2:05.70	
12	1	Dawn Gandy	England	2:06.52	
13	1	Jean Fletcher	Canada	2:07.30	
14	3	Sonya Bowyer	England	2:08.14	
15	3	Jennifer Fisher	Bermuda	2:08.65	
16	1	Julia Sandiford	Barbados	2:10.02	
17	2	Sheila Seebaluck	Mauritius	2:11.63	
18	2	Dithapelo Molefi	Botswana	2:11.64	
19	3	Motselisi Mojaki	Lesotho	2:31.66	
	1	Gifty Abankwa	Ghana	DQ	
	3	Dawn Williams	Dominica	DQ	
	2	Diane Modahl	England	DNS	

=== Final ===
Rank	Name	Nationality	Time	Notes
1st place, gold medalist(s)	Inez Turner	Jamaica	2:01.74	
2nd place, silver medalist(s)	Charmaine Crooks	Canada	2:02.35	
3rd place, bronze medalist(s)	Gladys Wamuyu	Kenya	2:03.12	
4	Cathy Dawson	Wales	2:03.17	
5	Selina Kosgei	Kenya	2:03.78	
6	Lisa Lightfoot	Australia	2:03.82	
7	Melanie Collins	Australia	2:04.09	
8	Sandra Dawson	Australia	2:04.41	
