= Ellen van Langen =

Dutch middle-distance runner

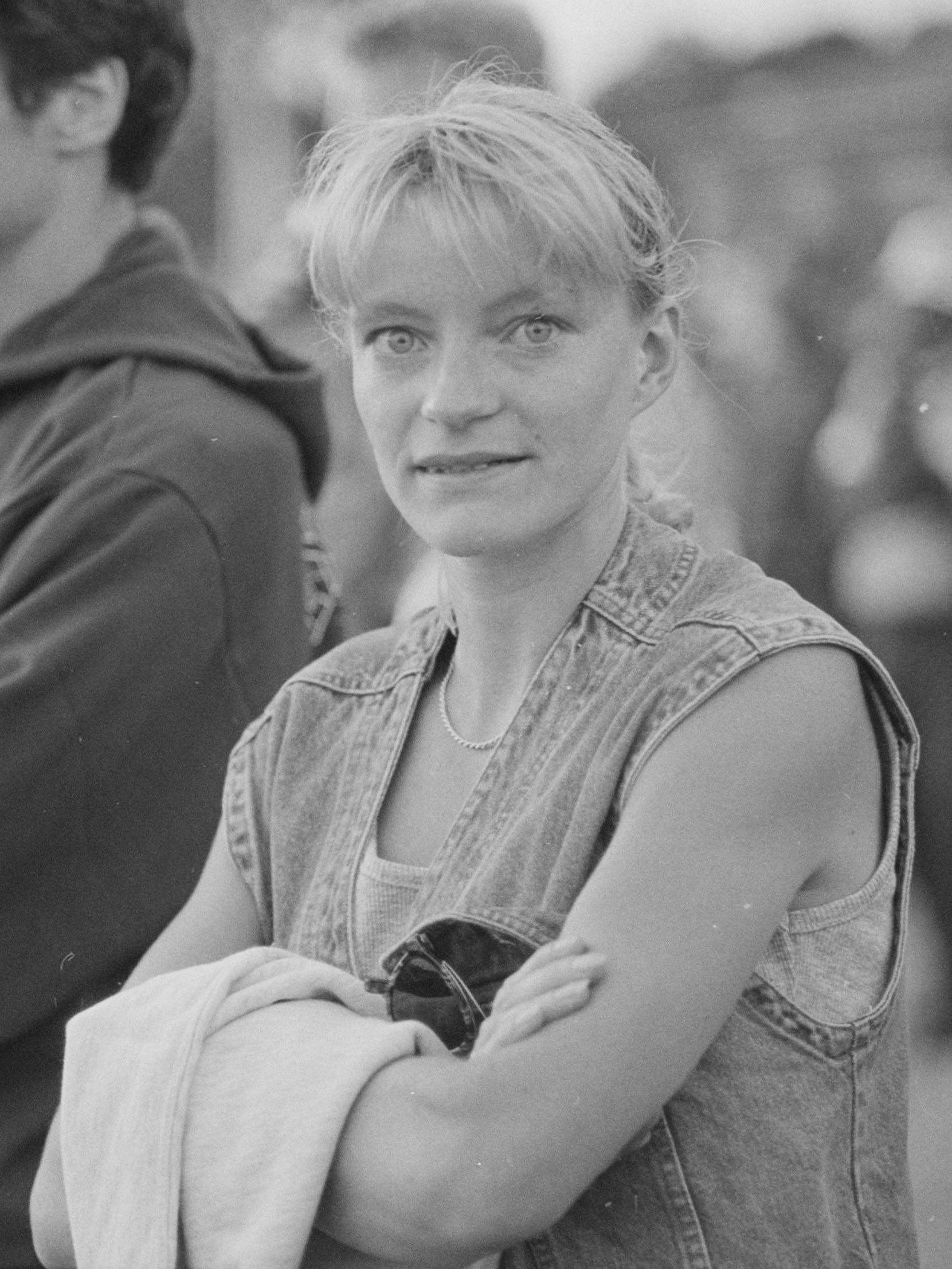
- Van Langen in 1994

Personal information
- Full name: Ellen Gezina Maria van Langen
- Born: 9 February 1966 (age 60) Oldenzaal, Netherlands
- Education: University of Amsterdam

Sport
- Country: Netherlands
- Sport: Track and field
- Event: 800 metres

Achievements and titles
- Personal bests: Outdoor; 800 m: 1:55.54 (1992); 1000 m: 2:35.21 (1993); 1500 m: 4:06.97 (1994); Mile: 4:31.88 (1992); Indoor; 800 m: 2:00.36 i (1995); 1000 m: 2:39.65 i (1990)
Medal record
Women's Athletics
Representing the Netherlands
Olympic Games
Gold medal – first place	1992 Barcelona	800 metres
Universiade
Silver medal – second place	1989 Duisburg	800 metres

Ellen Gezina Maria van Langen (Dutch: [ˈɛlə(ŋ) ɣeːˈzinaː maːˈrijaː vɑn ˈlɑŋə(n)]; born 9 February 1966) is a Dutch former middle distance runner, who specialised in the 800 metres. A talented but injury-ridden athlete, she was the 1992 Olympic Champion for the women's 800 meters. She is now the director of the FBK Games (the Hengelo meeting).

== Career ==
Van Langen was born in Oldenzaal, Overijssel. Before she started running, she played football. She only started to run seriously at 20. In 1989, she won her first of four national championships in the 800 meters and went on to win a silver medal behind Ana Quirot (Cuba) at the World Student Games (Universiade), running 1:59.82. In 1990, she finished fourth in the final of the European Championships in Split, with a Dutch national record of 1:57.57, behind the East German athletes Sigrun Wodars (gold), Christine Wachtel (silver) and Liliya Nurutdinova (bronze) from the Soviet Union.

During the year 1991, she was troubled by an Achilles tendon injury. At the Tokyo World Championships she was eliminated in the heats. The next year, leading up to the 1992 Olympic Games in Barcelona, she defeated Tokyo gold medallist Liliya Nurutdinova at the Fanny Blankers-Koen Games in Hengelo on 28 June in 1:56.66, the fastest time of the season prior to the Games. Just two weeks before the Olympics, she ran another fast time of 1:56.92 at Hechtel.

At the 1992 Olympic Games in Barcelona, Van Langen won the Olympic title in the 800 metres in a time of 1:55.54, a time which is still the Dutch national record. Fearing her final sprint, her competitors including favorites Nurutdinova, Quirot, Ella Kovacs (Romania) and Maria Mutola (Mozambique) set a rapid pace, running the first lap in a very fast time of 55.73, with Van Langen only in 6th position. Entering the final stretch Nurutdinova, who had led the final from the start, had a slight lead but Van Langen moved through on the inside in the last 50 m to win a surprise victory, beating Nurutdinova (silver) and Quirot (bronze).

The year 1992 remained her top year, when she won 10 of her 11 800 m races. After her Olympic triumph, she was plagued by various injuries. Her best result after 1992 was a 6th-place finish at the 1995 World Championships at Gothenburg. The ongoing injuries prevented her from defending her Olympic title in 1996. She retired from the sport in 1998.

Van Langen later explained the secret of her success. "I think what I could do well is I could die very well in a race and still continue,” she said. “That is very hard, because it hurts running the 800 meters. You have to overcome some boundaries in yourself to continue when it hurts like hell. I was good at it. If the Olympic race would have been run by each athlete individual and the fastest time was the winner I would not have won." She added: "I was also good in tactics, looking around me and taking the right decisions."

After her gold medal win in 1992 the Amsterdam unemployment benefits office terminated her dole on grounds that she might earn money from her victory in the future. She has a degree in economics from the University of Amsterdam, and currently works as an event manager for Global Sports Communication.

Van Langen is the director of the Fanny Blankers-Koen Games in Hengelo.

== Personal bests ==
Information from World Athletics profile unless otherwise noted.

Type	Event	Time	Venue	Date	Record	Notes
Outdoor	800 metres	1:55.54	Barcelona, Spain	3 August 1992	(NR)	Dutch record, shared with Femke Broeders-Bol from 14 August 2026 until 21 August 2026, when it was broken by Broeders-Bol.
Outdoor	1000 metres	2:35.21	Sheffield, United Kingdom	29 August 1993	(NR)	Dutch record until it was broken by Sifan Hassan on 24 May 2015.
Outdoor	1500 metres	4:06.97	Lausanne, Switzerland	6 July 1994		
Outdoor	One mile	4:31.88	Lausanne, Switzerland	8 July 1992		
Indoor	800 metres	2:00.36 i	Liévin, France	19 February 1995	(NR)	Dutch record until it was broken by Ester Goossens on 15 February 2001.
Indoor	1000 metres	2:39.65 i	Sindelfingen, Germany	21 January 1990	(NR)	Dutch record until it was broken by Sanne Verstegen on 18 February 2017.

Awards and achievements
Preceded by Elly van Hulst	KNAU Cup; 1990; 1992	Succeeded by Letitia Vriesde
Preceded by Letitia Vriesde	KNAU Cup; 1990; 1992	Succeeded by Nelli Fiere-Cooman
Preceded by Ingrid Haringa	Dutch Sportswoman of the Year; 1992	Succeeded by Leontien van Moorsel
