= Athletics at the 1994 Commonwealth Games – Women's 1500 metres =

Women's 1500 metres at the Commonwealth Games

The women's 1500 metres event at the 1994 Commonwealth Games was held in Victoria, British Columbia

== Results ==
Rank	Name	Nationality	Time	Notes
1st place, gold medalist(s)	Kelly Holmes	England	4:08.86	
2nd place, silver medalist(s)	Paula Schnurr	Canada	4:09.65	
3rd place, bronze medalist(s)	Gwen Griffiths	South Africa	4:10.16	
4	Leah Pells	Canada	4:10.82	
5	Margaret Leaney	Australia	4:11.48	
6	Jackline Maranga	Kenya	4:12.84	
7	Robyn Meagher	Canada	4:13.91	
8	Julia Sakara	Zimbabwe	4:18.11	
9	Lynn Gibson	England	4:18.36	
10	Palaniappan Jayanthi	Malaysia	4:24.31	
11	Sheila Seebaluck	Mauritius	4:26.45	
12	Chan Man Yee	Hong Kong	4:26.95	
13	Jennifer Fisher	Bermuda	4:29.96	
14	Rosemary Turare	Papua New Guinea	4:37.17	
	Gifty Abankwa	Ghana	DNF	
	Ann Griffiths	England	DNS	
