= 1991 IAAF World Indoor Championships – Women's 1500 metres =

The women's 1500 metres event at the 1991 IAAF World Indoor Championships was held on 9 and 10 March.

== Medalists ==
Gold	Silver	Bronze
Lyudmila Rogachova; Soviet Union	Ivana Kubešová; Czechoslovakia	Tudorița Chidu; Romania

== Results ==
=== Heats ===
First 4 of each heat (Q) and next 2 fastest (q) qualified for the semifinals.

Rank	Heat	Name	Nationality	Time	Notes
1	2	Tudorița Chidu	Romania	4:09.27	Q
2	2	Alisa Hill	United States	4:09.45	Q
3	2	Lyudmila Rogachova	Soviet Union	4:09.48	Q
4	2	Ellen Kiessling	Germany	4:10.23	Q
5	2	Yvonne van der Kolk	Netherlands	4:10.40	q
6	1	Doina Melinte	Romania	4:11.74	Q
7	1	Ivana Kubešová	Czechoslovakia	4:11.95	Q
8	1	Yvonne Mai	Germany	4:12.04	Q
9	1	Gina Procaccio	United States	4:12.17	Q
10	1	Jo White	Great Britain	4:12.39	q
11	2	Jo Dering	Great Britain	4:13.10	
12	1	Veronique Pongerard	France	4:14.30	NR
13	2	Leah Pells	Canada	4:20.00	
	1	Lyubov Kremlyova	Soviet Union	DNF	
	2	Rosalie Bagué Peng Gangué	Chad	DNS	

=== Final ===
Rank	Name	Nationality	Time	Notes
1st place, gold medalist(s)	Lyudmila Rogachova	Soviet Union	4:05.09	
2nd place, silver medalist(s)	Ivana Kubešová	Czechoslovakia	4:06.22	NR
3rd place, bronze medalist(s)	Tudorița Chidu	Romania	4:06.27	PB
4	Doina Melinte	Romania	4:06.65	
5	Yvonne van der Kolk	Netherlands	4:06.86	PB
6	Yvonne Mai	Germany	4:07.30	
7	Alisa Hill	United States	4:08.54	
8	Gina Procaccio	United States	4:19.51	
9	Jo White	Great Britain	4:20.72	
	Ellen Kiessling	Germany	DNS	
