= 1997 IAAF World Indoor Championships – Women's 800 metres =

The women's 800 metres event at the 1997 IAAF World Indoor Championships was held on March 7–9.

== Medalists ==
Gold	Silver	Bronze
Maria Mutola; Mozambique	Natalya Dukhnova; Belarus	Joetta Clark; United States

== Results ==
=== Heats ===
First 2 of each heat (Q) and next 4 fastest (q) qualified for the semifinals.

Rank	Heat	Name	Nationality	Time	Notes
1	4	Toni Hodgkinson	New Zealand	2:01.64	Q, AR
2	4	Natalya Dukhnova	Belarus	2:01.87	Q
3	4	Ludmila Formanová	Czech Republic	2:02.04	q
4	4	Hayley Parry	Great Britain	2:03.82	q
5	2	Letitia Vriesde	Suriname	2:04.14	Q
6	4	Ana Menéndez	Spain	2:04.19	q, PB
7	2	Stephanie Graf	Austria	2:04.53	Q
8	1	Joetta Clark	United States	2:04.59	Q
9	3	Maria Mutola	Mozambique	2:04.60	Q
10	3	Irina Biryukova	Russia	2:04.81	Q
11	2	Regula Zürcher	Switzerland	2:04.82	q
12	1	Inez Turner	Jamaica	2:04.86	Q
13	1	Séverine Foulon	France	2:04.91	PB
14	3	Amy Wickus	United States	2:05.09	
15	2	Yelena Martson	Ukraine	2:05.65	PB
16	3	Virginie Fouquet	France	2:05.73	
17	1	Zhang Jiang	China	2:06.70	
17	3	Michelle Faherty	Great Britain	2:06.78	
18	2	Argentina Paulino	Mozambique	2:08.03	
19	4	Achta Yorassem	Chad	2:23.23	
	1	Tatiana Grigorieva	Russia	DNS	
	1	Patricia Traña	Nicaragua	DNS	

=== Semifinals ===
First 3 of each semifinal (Q) qualified directly for the final.

Rank	Heat	Name	Nationality	Time	Notes
1	2	Toni Hodgkinson	New Zealand	2:00.90	Q, AR
2	2	Letitia Vriesde	Suriname	2:01.41	Q
3	2	Natalya Dukhnova	Belarus	2:01.89	Q
4	1	Maria Mutola	Mozambique	2:02.59	Q
5	2	Regula Zürcher	Switzerland	2:02.70	
6	1	Joetta Clark	United States	2:02.93	Q
7	1	Irina Biryukova	Russia	2:03.16	Q
8	1	Ludmila Formanová	Czech Republic	2:03.23	
9	2	Inez Turner	Jamaica	2:03.51	
10	1	Hayley Parry	Great Britain	2:04.40	
11	2	Stephanie Graf	Austria	2:04.79	
12	1	Ana Menéndez	Spain	2:04.86	

=== Final ===
Rank	Name	Nationality	Time	Notes
1st place, gold medalist(s)	Maria Mutola	Mozambique	1:58.96	
2nd place, silver medalist(s)	Natalya Dukhnova	Belarus	1:59.31	NR
3rd place, bronze medalist(s)	Joetta Clark	United States	1:59.82	PB
4	Letitia Vriesde	Suriname	1:59.84	
5	Toni Hodgkinson	New Zealand	2:00.36	AR
6	Irina Biryukova	Russia	2:00.61	PB
