= Menike =

Menike may refer to:

- Podi Menike, Sri Lankan passenger train
- Udarata Menike, Sri Lankan passenger train
- Sriyani Dhammika Menike (born 1970), Sri Lankan middle-distance runner.
