= Liliya Nurutdinova =

Soviet middle-distance runner

Medal record

Women's athletics

Representing the Unified Team

Olympic Games
Gold medal – first place	1992 Barcelona	4 × 400 m relay
Silver medal – second place	1992 Barcelona	800 m

Representing Soviet Union

World Championships
Gold medal – first place	1991 Tokyo	800 m

European Championships
Bronze medal – third place	1990 Split	800 m

Liliya Foatovna Nurutdinova (Russian: Лилия Фоатовна Нурутдинова; born 15 December 1963) is a retired middle-distance runner who represented the Soviet Union and the Unified Team.

Her greatest achievement was the 1992 Olympic silver medal when she ran the 800 m in 1:55.99 min, her personal best time. She looked to have the race won, but, tiring, she moved away from the curb on the stretch, and was passed on the inside by gold medalist Ellen van Langen 50 metres from the finish line. She is also the 1991 World 800-metre champion where she held off Ana Quirot, Ella Kovacs, and Maria Mutola in a finish which saw Kovacs fall, the women jammed together, and the top four separated by less than two-tenths of a second. She was born in Naberezhnye Chelny, Tatar Autonomous Soviet Socialist Republic.

== Doping ban ==
At the 1993 World Championships in Athletics Nurutdinova tested positive for the anabolic steroid stanozolol, and she was subsequently disqualified and handed a 4-year ban from sport. She retired from the sport immediately after.

== International competitions ==
Year	Competition	Venue	Position	Event	Notes
Representing Soviet Union
1990	Goodwill Games	Seattle, United States	2nd	800 m	1:57.52
1990	European Championships	Split, Yugoslavia	3rd	800 m	
1991	World Championships	Tokyo, Japan	1st	800 m	
Representing Unified Team
1992	Olympic Games	Barcelona, Spain	2nd	800 m	
1992	Olympic Games	Barcelona, Spain	1st	4 × 400 m relay	
Representing Russia
1993	World Championships	Stuttgart, Germany	DQ (7th)	800 m	Doping

== See also ==
- List of doping cases in athletics
