= 1995 World Championships in Athletics – Women's 800 metres =

These are the results of the Women's 800 metres event at the 1995 World Championships in Athletics in Gothenburg, Sweden.

== Medalists ==
Gold	Ana Fidelia Quirot; Cuba (CUB)
Silver	Letitia Vriesde; Suriname (SUR)
Bronze	(United Kingdom) Kelly Holmes; Great Britain (GBR)

== Results ==
=== Heats ===
First 2 of each heat (Q) and the next 6 fastest (q) qualified for the semifinals.

Rank	Heat	Name	Nationality	Time	Notes
1	1	Patricia Djaté-Taillard	France	1:59.07	Q
2	1	Ellen Van Langen	Netherlands	1:59.61	Q
3	2	Letitia Vriesde	Suriname	1:59.73	Q
4	4	Maria Mutola	Mozambique	1:59.93	Q
5	2	Tatyana Grigoryeva	Russia	2:00.03	Q
6	1	Natalya Dukhnova	Belarus	2:00.13	q
6	4	Meredith Rainey-Valmon	United States	2:00.13	Q
8	2	Kelly Holmes	Great Britain	2:00.23	q
9	2	Tina Paulino	Mozambique	2:00.75	q
10	3	Ana Fidelia Quirot	Cuba	2:00.84	Q
11	4	Ella Kovacs	Romania	2:00.95	q
12	3	Yelena Afanasyeva	Russia	2:01.04	Q
13	2	Stella Jongmans	Netherlands	2:01.13	q
14	4	Svetlana Miroshnik	Ukraine	2:01.24	q
15	1	Amy Wickus	United States	2:01.38	
16	3	Petya Strashilova	Bulgaria	2:01.54	
17	3	Joetta Clark	United States	2:01.70	
18	2	Kutre Dulecha	Ethiopia	2:01.74	
18	5	Inna Yevseyeva	Ukraine	2:01.74	Q
20	5	Lyubov Gurina	Russia	2:01.76	Q
21	5	Luciana Mendes	Brazil	2:01.82	
22	5	Charmaine Crooks	Canada	2:02.04	
23	1	Malin Ewerlöf	Sweden	2:02.28	
24	5	Ludmila Formanová	Czech Republic	2:02.39	
25	4	Anne Bruns	Germany	2:03.16	
26	1	Julia Sakara	Zimbabwe	2:03.68	
26	5	Jyotirmoy Sikdhar	India	2:03.68	
28	4	Aisling Molloy	Ireland	2:04.15	
29	3	Karen Gydesen	Denmark	2:04.41	
30	3	Regula Zürcher	Switzerland	2:05.87	
31	2	Lorie Ann Adams	Guyana	2:07.57	
32	3	Cheong Tsui Fong	Singapore	2:19.35	
33	2	Fanta Camara	Guinea	2:20.78	
34	1	Yaznee Nasheeda	Maldives	2:34.18	NR
35	5	Rita Martin	Sudan	2:43.22	
	4	Inez Turner	Jamaica	DQ	

=== Semifinals ===
First 4 of each heat (Q) qualified directly for the final.

Rank	Heat	Name	Nationality	Time	Notes
1	2	Meredith Rainey-Valmon	United States	1:58.49	Q
2	2	Tatyana Grigoryeva	Russia	1:58.61	Q
3	2	Lyubov Gurina	Russia	1:58.70	Q
4	2	Ellen Van Langen	Netherlands	1:58.86	Q
5	2	Natalya Dukhnova	Belarus	1:59.45	
6	2	Inna Yevseyeva	Ukraine	2:00.93	
7	1	Ana Fidelia Quirot	Cuba	2:01.37	Q
8	1	Kelly Holmes	Great Britain	2:01.52	Q
9	1	Patricia Djaté-Taillard	France	2:01.73	Q
10	1	Letitia Vriesde	Suriname	2:02.75	Q
11	2	Ella Kovacs	Romania	2:03.31	
12	1	Yelena Afanasyeva	Russia	2:03.66	
13	1	Svetlana Miroshnik	Ukraine	2:03.72	
14	1	Tina Paulino	Mozambique	2:04.51	
15	1	Stella Jongmans	Netherlands	2:05.11	
	2	Maria Mutola	Mozambique	DQ	

=== Final ===
Rank	Name	Nationality	Time	Notes
1st place, gold medalist(s)	Ana Fidelia Quirot	Cuba	1:56.11	
2nd place, silver medalist(s)	Letitia Vriesde	Suriname	1:56.68	AR
3rd place, bronze medalist(s)	Kelly Holmes	Great Britain	1:56.95	NR
4	Patricia Djaté-Taillard	France	1:57.04	NR
5	Meredith Rainey-Valmon	United States	1:58.20	
6	Ellen Van Langen	Netherlands	1:58.98	
7	Lyubov Gurina	Russia	1:59.16	
8	Tatyana Grigoryeva	Russia	2:05.55	
