= Athletics at the 1999 Pan American Games – Women's 800 metres =

Women's 800 metres at the Pan American Games

The women's 800 metres event at the 1999 Pan American Games was held July 24–25.

== Medalists ==
Gold	Silver	Bronze
Letitia Vriesde; Suriname	Zulia Calatayud; Cuba	Meredith Valmon; United States

== Results ==
=== Heats ===
Qualification: First 3 of each heat (Q) and the next 2 fastest (q) qualified for the final.

Rank	Heat	Name	Nationality	Time	Notes
1	2	Meredith Valmon	United States	2:01.95	Q
2	2	Zulia Calatayud	Cuba	2:02.34	Q
3	2	Yanelis Lara	Cuba	2:02.55	Q
4	2	Jeanette Castro	Mexico	2:02.64	q
5	2	Vicky Lynch-Pounds	Canada	2:02.80	q
6	1	Letitia Vriesde	Suriname	2:03.96	Q
7	1	Diane Cummins	Canada	2:04.53	Q
8	1	Kathleen Rounds	United States	2:04.63	Q
9	1	Charmaine Howell	Jamaica	2:04.65	
10	1	Yaneth Lucumí	Colombia	2:05.60	
11	2	Augustina Charles	Saint Lucia	2:09.14	
12	1	Niusha Mancilla	Bolivia	2:09.91	
	2	Madrea Hyman	Jamaica	DNS	

=== Final ===
Rank	Name	Nationality	Time	Notes
1st place, gold medalist(s)	Letitia Vriesde	Suriname	1:59.95	
2nd place, silver medalist(s)	Zulia Calatayud	Cuba	2:00.67	
3rd place, bronze medalist(s)	Meredith Valmon	United States	2:01.51	
4	Vicky Lynch-Pounds	Canada	2:02.78	
5	Diane Cummins	Canada	2:03.10	
6	Yanelis Lara	Cuba	2:03.32	
7	Jeanette Castro	Mexico	2:05.06	
	Kathleen Rounds	United States	DNF	
