= 1993 IAAF World Indoor Championships – Women's 400 metres =

The women's 400 metres event at the 1993 IAAF World Indoor Championships was held on 12 and 14 March.

== Medalists ==
Gold	Silver	Bronze
Sandie Richards; Jamaica	Tatyana Alekseyeva; Russia	Jearl Miles Clark; United States

== Results ==
=== Heats ===
First 2 of each heat (Q) qualified directly for the final.

Rank	Heat	Name	Nationality	Time	Notes
1	3	Jearl Miles Clark	United States	51.76	Q
2	2	Sandie Richards	Jamaica	51.86	Q, NR
3	2	Tatyana Alekseyeva	Russia	51.97	Q
4	3	Sandra Myers	Spain	52.10	Q
5	2	Jillian Richardson-Briscoe	Canada	52.15	
6	1	Renee Poetschka	Australia	52.70	Q
7	2	Ester Goossens	Netherlands	52.73	NR
8	1	Kim Batten	United States	52.77	Q
9	1	Karin Janke	Germany	52.83	
10	3	Tatyana Ledovskaya	Belarus	53.24	NR
11	3	Deon Hemmings	Jamaica	53.59	
12	1	Regula Zürcher-Scalabrin	Switzerland	53.76	
13	3	Donalda Duprey	Canada	54.52	

=== Final ===
Rank	Name	Nationality	Time	Notes
1st place, gold medalist(s)	Sandie Richards	Jamaica	50.93	NR
2nd place, silver medalist(s)	Tatyana Alekseyeva	Russia	51.03	NR
3rd place, bronze medalist(s)	Jearl Miles Clark	United States	51.37	PB
4	Sandra Myers	Spain	51.45	
5	Renee Poetschka	Australia	52.29	
6	Kim Batten	United States	52.70	
