= Leontia Sălăgeanu =

Romanian middle-distance runner

Personal information
- Nationality: Romanian
- Born: 24 March 1971 (age 55)

Sport
- Sport: Middle-distance running
- Event: 800 metres

Leontia "Liliana" Sălăgeanu (born 24 March 1971) is a Romanian middle-distance runner. She competed in the women's 800 metres at the 1992 Summer Olympics.
