= Meredith Rainey-Valmon =

American middle-distance runner

Personal information
- Full name: Meredith Lee Rainey
- Born: October 15, 1968 (age 58) Brooklyn, New York, U.S.
Medal record
Women's athletics
Representing the United States
Pan American Games
Gold medal – first place	1995 Mar del Plata	800 metres
Bronze medal – third place	1999 Winnipeg	800 metres

Meredith Lee Rainey-Valmon (born October 15, 1968, in Brooklyn, New York) is an American runner from Lefferts Manor, New York who specialized in the 800 metres.

Her personal best time was 1:57.04 minutes, achieved at the 1996 Olympic Trials. She is also a two-time Olympian, in 1992 and 1996. In 1996, she married fellow US Olympian, 400m runner and 1992 Olympic 4x400 gold medalist Andrew Valmon.

Running for Harvard University, she dominated Ivy League competition and won two NCAA Championships in the 800 meters in 1989, Indoors and Outdoors. She graduated in 1990.

== International competitions ==
Year	Competition	Venue	Position	Event	Notes
Representing United States
1989	Universiade	Duisburg, West Germany	8th	800 m	2:04.55
1990	Goodwill Games	Seattle, United States	6th	800 m	2:00.45
1991	World Indoor Championships	Seville, Spain	6th	800 m	2:04.82
1991	World Championships	Tokyo, Japan	26th (h)	800 m	2:04.84
1992	Olympic Games	Barcelona, Spain	17th (h)	800 m	2:01.33
1993	World Championships	Stuttgart, Germany	5th	800 m	1:59.57
1994	Goodwill Games	Saint Petersburg, Russia	5th	800 m	1:59.90
1995	Pan American Games	Mar del Plata, Argentina	1st	800 m	1:59.44
1995	World Championships	Gothenburg, Sweden	5th	800 m	1:58.20
1996	Olympic Games	Atlanta, United States	13th (sf)	800 m	1:59.36
1999	World Indoor Championships	Maebashi, Japan	4th	800 m	1:59.11
1999	Pan American Games	Winnipeg, Canada	3rd	800 m	2:01.51
1999	World Championships	Seville, Spain	18th (h)	800 m	2:00.86
(#) Indicates overall position in qualifying heats (h) or semifinals (sf)
