= Andrey Tikhonov (runner) =

Soviet long-distance runner

Personal information
- Full name: Andrey Viktorovich Tikhonov
- Nationality: Soviet (1966–1991); Russian (since 1991)
- Born: 11 December 1966 (age 59) Kemerovo, Kemerovsky District, Kemerovo Oblast, Soviet Union
- Height: 1.80 m (5 ft 11 in)
- Weight: 66 kg (146 lb)

Sport
- Sport: Long-distance running
- Event: 5000 metres

Andrey Viktorovich Tikhonov (Russian: Андрей Викторович Тихонов; born 11 December 1966) is a Russian (formerly Soviet) long-distance runner. He competed in the men's 5000 metres at the 1992 Summer Olympics, representing the Unified Team.
