= Liu Li (runner) =

Chinese middle-distance runner

Medal record

Women's athletics

Representing China

Asian Championships
Gold medal – first place	1993 Manila	800 m

Liu Li (born 12 March 1971) is a retired Chinese middle-distance runner who specialized in the 800 and 1500 metres.

== International competitions ==
Year	Competition	Venue	Position	Event	Notes
Representing China
1990	World Junior Championships	Plovdiv, Bulgaria	1st	800m	2:03.95
1990	World Junior Championships	Plovdiv, Bulgaria	5th	1500m	4:17.81
1992	Olympic Games	Barcelona, Spain	5th	1500 m	4:00.20
1993	World Championships	Stuttgart, Germany	6th	800 m	2:04.45
1993	Asian Championships	Manila, Philippines	1st	800 m	2:04.18
1994	Asian Games	Hiroshima, Japan	2nd	800 m	2:00.66
