= Tatyana Alekseyeva =

Russian sprinter

Personal information
- Full name: Tatyana Petrovna Alekseyeva
- Born: 7 October 1963 (age 62)

Sport
- Sport: Track and field

Achievements and titles
- Personal best: 49.98 (1997)
Medal record
Women's athletics
Representing Russia
World Championships
| Silver medal – second place | 1991 Tokyo | 4 × 400 m relay |
| Silver medal – second place | 1993 Stuttgart | 4 × 400 m relay |
World Indoor Championships
| Gold medal – first place | 1997 Paris | 4 × 400 m relay |
| Silver medal – second place | 1993 Toronto | 400 m |
Representing Soviet Union
Summer Universiade
| Gold medal – first place | 1985 Kobe | 400 m |
| Gold medal – first place | 1985 Kobe | 4 x 400 m relay |

Tatyana Petrovna Alekseyeva (Russian: Татьяна Петровна Алексеева; born 7 October 1963) is a former 400 metres sprinter from Novosibirsk, Russia. Her personal best result was 49.98. She retired from international competition after 1998. A three-time individual Russian national champion, she won 400 m silver medals at the IAAF World Indoor Championships and European Athletics Indoor Championships. With the Russian 4 × 400 metres relay team, she set an indoor world record to win gold at the 1997 IAAF World Indoor Championships and set the Russian record of 3:18.38 as silver medallist at the 1993 World Championships in Athletics.

== Career ==
Alekseyeva was a double gold medallist for the Soviet Union at the 1985 Summer Universiade, taking both individual and relay 400 m titles. She competed at the 1985 IAAF World Cup that year and shared in a relay silver medal with Irina Nazarova, Mariya Pinigina and Olha Bryzhina. She was chosen as the heats runner for the 4 × 400 metres relay at the 1991 World Championships in Athletics and helped the Soviet team to the final, where they took a silver medal.

Running a Russian indoor record of 51.03 seconds, Alekseyeva was the 400 m silver medalist at the 1993 IAAF World Indoor Championships. She also won a gold in the 4 × 400 metres relay, alongside Marina Shmonina, Yelena Andreyeva, and Yelena Ruzina, but the team was stripped of the titles due to doping by Shmonina. At the 1993 World Championships in Athletics she narrowly missed out on an individual medal, taking fourth behind Jamaica's Sandie Richards, but left the competition with a silver medal through the Russian record-breaking relay team including Ruzina, Margarita Ponomaryova and Irina Privalova, which was runner-up to the United States with 3:18.38 minutes.

Alekseyeva was the 400 m runner-up at the 1994 European Athletics Indoor Championships. In her last year of international competition, she helped set a world indoor record in the 4 × 400 m relay, anchoring the team of Tatyana Chebykina, Svetlana Goncharenko and Olga Kotlyarova to top the podium at the 1997 IAAF World Indoor Championships in 3:26.84 minutes. She was an individual and relay finalist at the 1997 World Championships in Athletics.

At national level, she won one outdoor national title in the 400 m at the 1997 Russian Athletics Championships and two indoor titles at the Russian Indoor Athletics Championships (1993, 1994). She was runner-up in the 200 metres and 4 × 400 metres relay at the 1991 Soviet Athletics Championships and placed third in the 60 metres at the 1992 Russian Indoor Athletics Championships.

== International competitions ==
| Year | Competition | Venue | Position | Event | Notes |
|---|---|---|---|---|---|
| 1985 | Universiade | Kobe, Japan | 1st | 400 m | 51.49 |
| 1985 | Universiade | Kobe, Japan | 1st | 4 × 400 m relay | 3:25.96 |
| 1985 | World Cup | Canberra, Australia | 2nd | 4 × 400 m relay | 3:20.60 |
| 1991 | World Championships | Tokyo, Japan | 2nd | 4 × 400 m relay | 3:23.38 (heats) |
| 1993 | World Indoor Championships | Toronto, Canada | 2nd | 400 metres | 51.03 NR |
| 1993 | World Indoor Championships | Toronto, Canada | DQ | 4 × 400 m relay | 3:28.90 |
| 1993 | World Championships | Stuttgart, Germany | 4th | 400 metres | 50.52 |
| 1993 | World Championships | Stuttgart, Germany | 2nd | 4 × 400 m relay | 3:18.38 NR |
| 1994 | European Indoor Championships | Paris, France | 2nd | 400 m | 51.77 |
| 1997 | World Indoor Championships | Paris, France | 1st | 4 × 400 m relay | 3:26.84 WR |
| 1997 | World Championships | Athens, Greece | 8th | 400 m | 51.37 |
| 1997 | World Championships | Athens, Greece | 4th | 4 × 400 m relay | 3:21.57 |

== National titles ==
- Russian Athletics Championships
  - 400 m: 1997
- Russian Indoor Athletics Championships
  - 400 m: 1993, 1994

== See also ==
- List of World Championships in Athletics medalists (women)
- List of IAAF World Indoor Championships medalists (women)
- List of European Athletics Indoor Championships medalists (women)
