= Athletics at the 1998 Commonwealth Games – Women's 1500 metres =

Women's 1500 metres at the Commonwealth Games

The women's 1500 metres event at the 1998 Commonwealth Games was held on 21 September on National Stadium, Bukit Jalil.

== Results ==
| Rank | Name | Nationality | Time | Notes |
|---|---|---|---|---|
| 1st place, gold medalist(s) | Jackline Maranga | Kenya | 4:05.27 | GR |
| 2nd place, silver medalist(s) | Kelly Holmes | England | 4:06.10 | |
| 3rd place, bronze medalist(s) | Julia Sakara | Zimbabwe | 4:07.82 | SB |
| 4 | Naomi Mugo | Kenya | 4:07.95 | |
| 5 | Cindy O'Krane | Canada | 4:08.88 | SB |
| 6 | Amanda Crowe | Northern Ireland | 4:10.68 | PB |
| 7 | Leah Pells | Canada | 4:10.71 | |
| 8 | Toni Hodgkinson | New Zealand | 4:10.99 | |
| 9 | Helen Pattinson | England | 4:12.61 | PB |
| 10 | Lynn Gibson | England | 4:13.35 | |
| 11 | Mandy Giblin | Australia | 4:20.15 | |
| 12 | Sarah Howell | Canada | 4:29.68 | |
| | Emma Davies | Wales | DNS | |
