= Cathy Dawson =

British middle-distance runner

Catherine Dawson (née White; born 9 March 1966) is a British former 800 metres runner. Representing Wales, she finished fourth in the 800m final at the 1994 Commonwealth Games, in a career-best time of 2:03.17. She also twice won the Welsh 800m title (1993–94).

== International competitions ==
Year	Competition	Venue	Position	Notes
Representing Wales
1994	Commonwealth Games	Victoria, Canada	4th	2:03.17
Representing Great Britain
1994	World Cup	London, United Kingdom	7th	2:04.13
