= Ana Amelia Menéndez =

Spanish middle-distance runner

Personal information
- Born: 17 March 1972 (age 54) Valdés, Asturias, Spain

Sport
- Sport: Track and field
Medal record
Representing Spain
Summer Universiade
| Bronze medal – third place | 1999 Palma de Mallorca | 1500m |

Ana Amelia Menéndez Bernardo (born 17 March 1972) is a retired Spanish middle distance runner who competed in the 800 and 1500 metres. She finished eighth at the 1999 World Championships. She also competed at the 1996 Summer Olympics failing to finish her race.

== Competition record ==
| Year | Competition | Venue | Position | Event | Notes |
Representing Spain
| 1995 | Universiade | Fukuoka, Japan | 13th (h) | 800 m | 2:06.90 |
| 1996 | European Indoor Championships | Stockholm, Sweden | 8th (h) | 800 m | 2:04.99 |
| 1996 | Olympic Games | Atlanta, United States | – | 800 m | DNF |
| 1997 | World Indoor Championships | Paris, France | 12th (sf) | 800 m | 2:04.86 |
| 1997 | Universiade | Catania, Italy | 4th | 800 m | 2:01.63 |
| 1998 | European Indoor Championships | Valencia, Spain | 15th (h) | 800 m | 2:05.09 |
| 1998 | Ibero-American Championships | Lisbon, Portugal | 1st | 800 m | 2:01.32 |
| 1999 | Universiade | Palma de Mallorca, Spain | 3rd | 1500 m | 4:14.95 |
| 1999 | World Championships | Seville, Spain | 8th | 1500 m | 4:04.72 |

== Personal bets ==
Outdoor

- 800 metres – 2:01.32 (Palma de Malorca 1999)
- 1500 metres – 4:04.59 (Zürich 1999)
- One mile – 4:35.38 (Seville 1997)

Indoor

- 800 metres – 2:03.39 (Genoa 1998)
- 1500 metres – 4:18.04 (Valencia 1999)
