= Athletics at the 1989 Summer Universiade – Women's 3000 metres =

The women's 3000 metres event at the 1989 Summer Universiade was held at the Wedaustadion in Duisburg on 27 August 1989.

== Results ==
| Rank | Athlete | Nationality | Time | Notes |
|---|---|---|---|---|
| 1st place, gold medalist(s) | Paula Ivan | Romania | 8:44.09 | GR |
| 2nd place, silver medalist(s) | Viorica Ghican | Romania | 8:46.27 | |
| 3rd place, bronze medalist(s) | Regina Čistiakova | Soviet Union | 8:55.73 | |
| 4 | Christien Toonstra | Netherlands | 8:58.80 | |
| 5 | Zita Ágoston | Hungary | 9:01.08 | |
| 6 | Jeanne-Marie Pipoz | Switzerland | 9:05.17 | |
| 7 | Sabine Kunkel | West Germany | 9:06.66 | |
| 8 | Laura Adam | Great Britain | 9:07.51 | |
| 9 | Alison Wiley | Canada | 9:09.73 | |
| 10 | Sabrina Dornhoefer | United States | 9:10.67 | |
| 11 | Tania Merchiers | Belgium | 9:11.33 | |
| 12 | Esther Kiplagat | Kenya | 9:13.95 | |
| 13 | Sabine Mann | West Germany | 9:16.74 | |
| 14 | Paula Schnurr | Canada | 9:17.57 | |
| 15 | Maria Guida | Italy | 9:26.07 | |
| 16 | Rita Cassia Jesus | Brazil | 9:27.33 | |
| 17 | Niamph Murphy | Ireland | 9:30.10 | |
| 18 | Taala Resh | United States | 9:31.18 | |
| 19 | Beatrice Atikoru | Uganda | 10:01.43 | |
