= Athletics at the 1995 Pan American Games – Women's 1500 metres =

Women's 1500 metres at the Pan American Games

The women's 1500 metres event at the 1995 Pan American Games was held at the Estadio Atletico "Justo Roman" on 19 March.

== Results ==
Rank	Name	Nationality	Time	Notes
1st place, gold medalist(s)	Sarah Thorsett	United States	4:21.84	
2nd place, silver medalist(s)	Sarah Howell	Canada	4:22.10	
3rd place, bronze medalist(s)	Marta Orellana	Argentina	4:22.44	
4	Letitia Vriesde	Suriname	4:23.80	
5	Kelly Rabush	United States	4:25.04	
6	Mireya Ailhaud	Mexico	4:28.76	
7	Jennifer Bean	Bermuda	4:29.77	
8	Mabel Arrúa	Argentina	4:31.63	
9	Clara Morales	Chile	4:34.81	
10	Charmaine Thomas	Antigua and Barbuda	4:45.95	
	Susana Díaz	Mexico	DNS	
	Bigna Samuel	Saint Vincent and the Grenadines	DNS	
	Julie Speights	United States	DNS	
