= Marta Orellana =

Argentine middle-distance runner

Personal information
- Full name: Marta Elena Orellana
- Born: 29 December 1973 (age 52) San Juan, Argentina
- Height: 1.74 m (5 ft 9 in)
- Weight: 55 kg (121 lb)

Sport
- Sport: Middle-distance running
- Event: 800 metres
Medal record
Representing Argentina
Pan American Games
Bronze medal – third place	1995 Mar del Plata	1500m
South American Games
Gold medal – first place	1994 Valencia	1500m
Bronze medal – third place	1994 Valencia	800m

Marta Elena Orellana (born 29 December 1973) is an Argentine middle-distance runner. She competed in the women's 800 metres at the 1996 Summer Olympics.

== International competitions ==
Year	Competition	Venue	Position	Event	Notes
Representing Argentina
1991	South American Junior Championships	Asunción, Paraguay	3rd	800 m	2:19.5
1991	South American Junior Championships	Asunción, Paraguay	2nd	1500 m	4:47.5
1993	South American Championships	Lima, Peru	6th	10,000 m	36:20.9
1994	Ibero-American Championships	Mar del Plata, Argentina	3rd	800 m	2:07.29
1994	Ibero-American Championships	Mar del Plata, Argentina	3rd	4 × 400 m relay	3:46.83
1995	Pan American Games	Mar del Plata, Argentina	4th	800 m	2:02.88
1995	Pan American Games	Mar del Plata, Argentina	3rd	1500 m	4:22.44
1995	South American Championships	Manaus, Brazil	2nd	800 m	2:06.37
1995	South American Championships	Manaus, Brazil	1st	1500 m	4:21.60
1996	Ibero-American Championships	Medellín, Colombia	3rd	800 m	2:04.81
1996	Ibero-American Championships	Medellín, Colombia	1st	1500 m	4:20.99
1996	Olympic Games	Atlanta, United States	29th (h)	800 m	2:04.99
