= Andrea Garae =

Vanuatuan middle-distance runner

Andrea Rose Garae-Tari (born 28 June 1973) is a Vanuatuan athlete.

Garae competed at the 1992 Summer Olympics held in Barcelona, she entered the 800 metres where she finished 7th in her heat so did not qualify for the next round. She was also a bronze medalist at the South Pacific Games and after her athletics career, became a registered pharmacist.
