= Rosalie Gangué =

Chadian middle-distance runner

Rosalie Gangué (born May 31, 1975) is a middle distance athlete who competed internationally for Chad. She was the first woman to represent Chad at the Olympics.

Gangué represented Chad at the 1992 Summer Olympics in Barcelona she was aged 17 years old, she competed in the 800 metres but she did not finish her heat, she also competed in the 1500 metres where she finished 10th in her heat so therefore did not qualify for the next round.
