= 1990 World Junior Championships in Athletics – Women's 800 metres =

The women's 800 metres event at the 1990 World Junior Championships in Athletics was held in Plovdiv, Bulgaria, at Deveti Septemvri Stadium on 8, 9 and 10 August.

== Medalists ==
| Gold | Liu Li; China |
| Silver | Maria Magdalena Nedelcu; Romania |
| Bronze | Aurica Rautu; Romania |

== Results ==
=== Final ===
10 August

| Rank | Name | Nationality | Time | Notes |
|---|---|---|---|---|
| 1st place, gold medalist(s) | Liu Li | China | 2:03.95 | |
| 2nd place, silver medalist(s) | Maria Magdalena Nedelcu | Romania | 2:04.52 | |
| 3rd place, bronze medalist(s) | Aurica Rautu | Romania | 2:04.78 | |
| 4 | Carla Sacramento | Portugal | 2:04.83 | |
| 5 | Larisa Popova | Soviet Union | 2:05.65 | |
| 6 | Qu Yunxia | China | 2:06.60 | |
| 7 | Fabia Trabaldo | Italy | 2:06.95 | |
| 8 | Patricia Djaté | France | 2:09.26 | |

=== Semifinals ===
9 August

==== Semifinal 1 ====
| Rank | Name | Nationality | Time | Notes |
|---|---|---|---|---|
| 1 | Liu Li | China | 2:05.98 | Q |
| 2 | Carla Sacramento | Portugal | 2:06.85 | Q |
| 3 | Maria Magdalena Nedelcu | Romania | 2:06.95 | Q |
| 4 | Fabia Trabaldo | Italy | 2:07.09 | Q |
| 5 | Toni Hodgkinson | New Zealand | 2:08.38 | |
| 6 | Anne Bruns | West Germany | 2:08.84 | |
| 7 | Stella Jongmans | Netherlands | 2:09.89 | |
| 8 | Evelyn Musonda | Zambia | 2:13.84 | |

==== Semifinal 2 ====
| Rank | Name | Nationality | Time | Notes |
|---|---|---|---|---|
| 1 | Qu Yunxia | China | 2:04.09 | Q |
| 2 | Aurica Rautu | Romania | 2:04.57 | Q |
| 3 | Patricia Djaté | France | 2:05.05 | Q |
| 4 | Larisa Popova | Soviet Union | 2:06.77 | Q |
| 5 | Natalie Tait | United Kingdom | 2:08.55 | |
| 6 | Irma Betancourt | Mexico | 2:09.15 | |
| 7 | Maria Taneva | Bulgaria | 2:14.07 | |
| | Inez Turner | Jamaica | DQ | |

=== Heats ===
8 August

==== Heat 1 ====
| Rank | Name | Nationality | Time | Notes |
|---|---|---|---|---|
| 1 | Liu Li | China | 2:07.41 | Q |
| 2 | Natalie Tait | United Kingdom | 2:08.18 | Q |
| 3 | Patricia Djaté | France | 2:08.33 | Q |
| 4 | Maria Taneva | Bulgaria | 2:09.63 | q |
| 5 | Evelyn Musonda | Zambia | 2:10.64 | q |
| 6 | Emebet Shiferaw | Ethiopia | 2:16.02 | |
| 7 | Elizabeth Tungaraza | Tanzania | 2:18.25 | |

==== Heat 2 ====
| Rank | Name | Nationality | Time | Notes |
|---|---|---|---|---|
| 1 | Maria Magdalena Nedelcu | Romania | 2:11.38 | Q |
| 2 | Anne Bruns | West Germany | 2:11.45 | Q |
| 3 | Irma Betancourt | Mexico | 2:11.47 | Q |
| 4 | Sophie Scamps | Australia | 2:11.77 | |
| 5 | Najat Ouali | Morocco | 2:11.90 | |
| 6 | Kimberly Toney | United States | 2:12.26 | |
| 7 | Amna Abakar | Sudan | 2:28.59 | |

==== Heat 3 ====
| Rank | Name | Nationality | Time | Notes |
|---|---|---|---|---|
| 1 | Aurica Rautu | Romania | 2:10.39 | Q |
| 2 | Stella Jongmans | Netherlands | 2:10.50 | Q |
| 3 | Carla Sacramento | Portugal | 2:10.56 | Q |
| 4 | Qu Yunxia | China | 2:10.76 | q |
| 5 | Séverine Foulon | France | 2:10.88 | |
| 6 | Ursula Friedmann | West Germany | 2:12.71 | |
| | Egigayehu Worku | Ethiopia | DQ | IAAF rule 141.3 |

==== Heat 4 ====
| Rank | Name | Nationality | Time | Notes |
|---|---|---|---|---|
| 1 | Larisa Popova | Soviet Union | 2:06.61 | Q |
| 2 | Inez Turner | Jamaica | 2:06.69 | Q |
| 3 | Fabia Trabaldo | Italy | 2:06.79 | Q |
| 4 | Toni Hodgkinson | New Zealand | 2:07.04 | q |
| 5 | Pavlina Neycheva | Bulgaria | 2:13.35 | |

== Participation ==
According to an unofficial count, 26 athletes from 20 countries participated in the event.

- Australia (1)
- Bulgaria (2)
- China (2)
- Ethiopia (2)
- France (2)
- Italy (1)
- Jamaica (1)
- Mexico (1)
- Morocco (1)
- Netherlands (1)
- New Zealand (1)
- Portugal (1)
- Romania (2)
- Soviet Union (1)
- Sudan (1)
- Tanzania (1)
- United Kingdom (1)
- United States (1)
- West Germany (2)
- Zambia (1)
