= Jennifer Fisher (athlete) =

Bermudian middle-distance runner

Personal information
- Nationality: Bermudian/USA Citizen
- Born: 6 November 1959 (age 66) Bermuda

Sport
- Sport: Athletics
- Event(s): 800 metres, 1500 metres
Medal record
Representing Bermuda
Central American and Caribbean Games
Bronze medal – third place	1990 Mexico City	800m
Bronze medal – third place	1990 Mexico City	1500m

Jennifer S. Fisher (also known as Jennifer Bean, born 6 November 1959) is a retired Bermudian middle-distance runner. She represented her country in the 800 metres at the 1983 and 1987 World Championships.

She was Bermuda's Athlete of the Year for 1984/1985.

== International competitions ==
Year	Competition	Venue	Position	Event	Notes
Representing Bermuda
1983	World Championships	Helsinki, Finland	16th (sf)	800 m	2:12.93
1987	Pan American Games	Indianapolis, United States	7th	800 m	2:09.37
1987	World Championships	Rome, Italy	23rd (h)	800 m	2:09.04
1990	Central American and Caribbean Games	Mexico City, Mexico	3rd	800 m	2:09.52
1990	Central American and Caribbean Games	Mexico City, Mexico	3rd	1500 m	4:57.25
1993	Central American and Caribbean Championships	Cali, Colombia	2nd	800 m	2:09.12
1994	Commonwealth Games	Victoria, Canada	15th (h)	800 m	2:08.65
1994	Commonwealth Games	Victoria, Canada	13th	1500 m	4:29.96
1995	Pan American Games	Mar del Plata, Argentina	6th	800 m	2:05.62
1995	Pan American Games	Mar del Plata, Argentina	7th	1500 m	4:29.77

== Personal bests ==
Outdoor

- 800 meters – 2:05.62 (Mar del Plata 1995)
- 5000 meters – 17:48.34 (Abbotsford 1996) NR
- 10,000 meters – 39:26.51 (Coquitlam 1992) NR
- 400 meters hurdles – 1:03.55 (Amherst 1995)
