= Athletics at the 1999 Summer Universiade – Women's 1500 metres =

The women's 1500 metres event at the 1999 Summer Universiade was held on 8 and 11 July at the Estadio Son Moix in Palma de Mallorca, Spain.

== Medalists ==
Gold	Silver	Bronze
Elena Buhăianu; Romania	Luminita Gogîrlea; Romania	Ana Amelia Menéndez; Spain

== Results ==
=== Heats ===
Rank	Heat	Athlete	Nationality	Time	Notes
1	1	Ana Amelia Menéndez	Spain	4:15.46	Q
2	1	Luminita Gogîrlea	Romania	4:15.48	Q
3	1	Jenelle Deatherage	United States	4:15.53	Q, PB
4	1	Benita Willis	Australia	4:15.68	Q
5	1	Rie Ueno	Japan	4:15.72	q, PB
6	2	Elena Buhăianu	Romania	4:16.10	Q
7	2	Céline Rajot	France	4:16.40	Q
8	2	Niamh Beirne	Ireland	4:16.40	Q
9	2	Sarah Jamieson	Australia	4:16.50	Q
10	2	Adoracion García	Spain	4:16.60	q, SB
11	2	Janet Westphal	United States	4:17.80	q
12	2	Andrea Grove	Canada	4:18.00	q
13	2	Veslemøy Hausken	Norway	4:18.10	
14	1	Avril Halstead	South Africa	4:18.87	
15	1	Süreyya Ayhan	Turkey	4:20.12	
16	2	Chan Man Yee	Hong Kong	4:21.60	NR
17	1	Hanne Lyngstad	Norway	4:24.97	
18	1	Hind Dehiba	Morocco	4:27.50	
19	1	Nathalie Côté	Canada	4:27.88	
20	2	Nina Rillstone	New Zealand	4:29.60	
21	1	Malebogo Moyanpi	Botswana	4:52.11	
22	2	Sylla Kensa Marques	Guinea	5:12.70	
	1	Carole Kanaan	Lebanon	DNS	

=== Final ===
Rank	Athlete	Nationality	Time	Notes
1st place, gold medalist(s)	Elena Buhăianu	Romania	4:13.04	
2nd place, silver medalist(s)	Luminita Gogîrlea	Romania	4:14.61	
3rd place, bronze medalist(s)	Ana Amelia Menéndez	Spain	4:14.95	
4	Sarah Jamieson	Australia	4:15.28	
5	Benita Willis	Australia	4:15.72	
6	Céline Rajot	France	4:16.23	
7	Rie Ueno	Japan	4:16.44	
8	Niamh Beirne	Ireland	4:16.47	
9	Adoracion García	Spain	4:18.15	
10	Janet Westphal	United States	4:19.24	
11	Jenelle Deatherage	United States	4:19.48	
12	Andrea Grove	Canada	4:26.66	
