= Athletics at the 1998 Commonwealth Games – Women's 800 metres =

Women's 800 metres at the Commonwealth Games

The women's 800 metres event at the 1998 Commonwealth Games was held 17–19 September on National Stadium, Bukit Jalil.

== Medalists ==
Gold	Silver	Bronze
Maria Mutola; Mozambique	Tina Paulino; Mozambique	Diane Modahl; England

== Results ==
=== Heats ===
Qualification: First 3 of each heat (Q) and the next 4 fastest (q) qualified for the semifinals.

Rank	Heat	Name	Nationality	Time	Notes
1	2	Maria Mutola	Mozambique	1:59.06	Q
2	2	Mardrea Hyman	Jamaica	2:01.43	Q
3	2	Vicky Lynch-Pounds	Canada	2:02.31	Q
4	4	Tina Paulino	Mozambique	2:02.33	Q
5	2	Emma Davies	Wales	2:02.39	q
6	3	Julia Sakara	Zimbabwe	2:02.62	Q
7	4	Toni Hodgkinson	New Zealand	2:02.96	Q
8	3	Tamsyn Lewis	Australia	2:02.97	Q
9	3	Gladys Wamuyu	Kenya	2:03.01	Q
10	3	Lwiza John	Tanzania	2:02.39	q
10	4	Mari-Louise Henning	South Africa	2:03.14	Q
12	4	Rachel Newcombe	Wales	2:03.58	q
13	4	Diane Cummins	Canada	2:03.71	q
14	1	Diane Modahl	England	2:06.44	Q
15	1	Amanda Crowe	Northern Ireland	2:06.64	Q
16	1	Grace Birungi	Uganda	2:06.81	Q
17	4	Adama Njie	Gambia	2:07.51	
18	1	Nancy Langat	Kenya	2:07.68	
19	2	Stéphanie Zanga	Cameroon	2:08.81	
20	1	Soloseeni Krishnan	Malaysia	2:09.45	
21	3	Dithapelo Molefi	Botswana	2:09.72	
22	2	Karolina Tonono	Fiji	2:17.76	
23	4	Bernadette Amara	Sierra Leone	2:31.56	
24	2	Yaznee Nasheeda	Maldives	2:32.27	
	1	Ruth Nanyiza	Zambia	DNF	
	3	Tanya Blake	England	DNS	

=== Semifinals ===
Qualification: First 4 of each heat qualified directly (Q) for the final.

Rank	Heat	Name	Nationality	Time	Notes
1	1	Tina Paulino	Mozambique	2:00.11	Q, SB
2	1	Julia Sakara	Zimbabwe	2:00.49	Q, SB
3	1	Lwiza John	Tanzania	2:01.63	Q, PB
4	1	Gladys Wamuyu	Kenya	2:01.80	Q, PB
5	1	Amanda Crowe	Northern Ireland	2:01.83	PB
6	1	Vicky Lynch-Pounds	Canada	2:02.79	
7	2	Maria Mutola	Mozambique	2:02.84	Q
8	2	Diane Modahl	England	2:03.04	Q
9	1	Rachel Newcombe	Wales	2:03.28	PB
10	2	Mardrea Hyman	Jamaica	2:03.33	Q
11	2	Tamsyn Lewis	Australia	2:03.56	Q
12	2	Toni Hodgkinson	New Zealand	2:04.00	
13	1	Mari-Louise Henning	South Africa	2:04.17	
14	2	Diane Cummins	Canada	2:04.40	
15	2	Emma Davies	Wales	2:05.03	
16	2	Grace Birungi	Uganda	2:05.06	

=== Final ===
Rank	Name	Nationality	Time	Notes
1st place, gold medalist(s)	Maria Mutola	Mozambique	1:57.60	CR
2nd place, silver medalist(s)	Tina Paulino	Mozambique	1:58.39	SB
3rd place, bronze medalist(s)	Diane Modahl	England	1:58.81	
4	Mardrea Hyman	Jamaica	1:59.71	SB
5	Julia Sakara	Zimbabwe	2:00.60	
6	Tamsyn Lewis	Australia	2:01.71	PB
7	Lwiza John	Tanzania	2:01.92	
8	Gladys Wamuyu	Kenya	2:02.74	
