= Julia Sakara =

Zimbabwean middle-distance runner

Medal record

Women's athletics

Representing Zimbabwe

African Championships
Silver medal – second place	1998 Dakar	1500 m
Bronze medal – third place	1998 Dakar	800 m

Julia Sakala (born 12 July 1969) is a retired Zimbabwean middle-distance runner.Julia Sakala used to run for textile manufacturing Company David Whitehead in Chegutu.She has won a lot of Gold medals in the early 1980s to late 1990s. She represented Zimbabwe mainly in the 800m winning bronze at the 1995 All africa games.

== International competitions ==
Year	Competition	Venue	Position	Event	Notes
Representing Zimbabwe
1993	World Championships	Stuttgart, Germany	16th (h)	3000 m	8:57.69
1993	World Championships	Stuttgart, Germany	26th (h)	10,000 m	33:20.16
1993	World Half Marathon Championships	Brussels, Belgium	16th	Half Marathon	1:12:28
1994	Commonwealth Games	Victoria, Canada	9th (h)	800 m	2:04.60
1994	Commonwealth Games	Victoria, Canada	8th	1500 m	4:18.11
1995	World Championships	Gothenburg, Sweden	26th (h)	800 m	2:03.68
1995	World Championships	Gothenburg, Sweden	23rd (sf)	1500 m	4:16.67
1995	All-Africa Games	Harare, Zimbabwe	2nd	1500 m	4:21.10
1997	World Championships	Athens, Greece	23rd (h)	800 m	2:03.55
1998	African Championships	Dakar, Senegal	3rd	800 m	2:01.55
1998	African Championships	Dakar, Senegal	2nd	1500 m	4:13.64
1998	Commonwealth Games	Kuala Lumpur, Malaysia	5th	800 m	2:00.60
1998	Commonwealth Games	Kuala Lumpur, Malaysia	3rd	1500 m	4:07.82
1999	World Championships	Seville, Spain	29th (h)	800 m	2:03.52
1999	World Championships	Seville, Spain	26th (h)	1500 m	4:19.65
1999	All-Africa Games	Johannesburg, South Africa	9th	1500 m	4:29.00
2000	Olympic Games	Sydney, Australia	35th (h)	1500 m	4:21.94
