= Athletics at the 1995 Pan American Games – Women's 800 metres =

Women's 800 metres at the Pan American Games

The women's 800 metres event at the 1995 Pan American Games was held at the Estadio Atletico "Justo Roman" on 22 and 23 March.

== Medalists ==
Gold	Silver	Bronze
Meredith Rainey; United States	Luciana Mendes; Brazil	Letitia Vriesde; Suriname

== Results ==
=== Heats ===
Rank	Heat	Name	Nationality	Time	Notes
1	1	Luciana Mendes	Brazil	2:02.87	Q
2	2	Meredith Rainey	United States	2:05.49	Q
3	1	Marta Orellana	Argentina	2:05.74	Q
4	1	Letitia Vriesde	Suriname	2:06.00	Q
5	1	Jennifer Bean	Bermuda	2:06.52	q
6	2	Vicky Lynch	Canada	2:06.81	Q
7	2	Odalmis Limonta	Cuba	2:09.37	Q
8	2	Charmaine Thomas	Antigua and Barbuda	2:09.64	q
9	1	Shermaine Ross	Grenada	2:10.73	
10	2	Carmen Arrúa	Argentina	2:13.13	
	2	Inez Turner	Jamaica	DNS	

=== Final ===
Rank	Name	Nationality	Time	Notes
1	Meredith Rainey	United States	1:59.44	
2	Luciana Mendes	Brazil	2:01.74	
3	Letitia Vriesde	Suriname	2:02.25	
4	Marta Orellana	Argentina	2:02.88	NR
5	Vicky Lynch	Canada	2:05.35	
6	Jennifer Fisher	Bermuda	2:05.62	
7	Odalmis Limonta	Cuba	2:10.15	
8	Charmaine Thomas	Antigua and Barbuda	2:11.18	
