= Gladys Wamuyu =

Kenyan middle-distance runner (born 1972)

Personal information
- Born: 23 December 1972 (age 53)
- Height: 1.67 m (5 ft 6 in)
- Weight: 63 kg (139 lb)

Sport
- Sport: Athletics
- Event: 800 m
Medal record
Women's athletics
Representing Kenya
African Championships
Silver medal – second place	1993 Durban	800 m
Silver medal – second place	2000 Algiers	1500 m
Bronze medal – third place	2000 Algiers	800 m

Gladys Wamuyu Wachiuri (born 23 December 1972) is a retired Kenyan middle-distance runner competing primarily in the 800 metres. She represented her country at the 1992 Summer Olympics. In addition, she won the bronze medal at the 1994 Commonwealth Games.

== Competition record ==
Year	Competition	Venue	Position	Event	Notes
Representing Kenya
1991	All-Africa Games	Cairo, Egypt	3rd	800 m	2:07.14
1992	Olympic Games	Barcelona, Spain	26th (h)	800 m	2:03.01
1993	African Championships	Durban, South Africa	2nd	800 m	2:01.24
1993	World Championships	Stuttgart, Germany	16th (sf)	800 m	2:02.13
1994	Commonwealth Games	Victoria, Canada	3rd	800 m	2:03.12
1998	Commonwealth Games	Kuala Lumpur, Malaysia	8th	800 m	2:02.74
2000	African Championships	Algiers, Algeria	3rd	800 m	2:00.32
2000	African Championships	Algiers, Algeria	2nd	1500 m	4:16.56

== Personal bests ==
- 800 metres – 2:00.32 (Algiers 2000)
- 1000 metres – 2:42.98 (Nice 2000)
- 1500 metres – 4:11.94 (Brisbane 2000)
