= Julie Jenkins =

American middle-distance runner

Personal information
- Nationality: American
- Born: August 12, 1964 (age 61) Ogden, Utah, United States

Sport
- Sport: Middle-distance running
- Event: 800 metres

Julie Ann Jenkins (born August 12, 1964) is an American middle-distance runner. She competed in the women's 800 metres at the 1992 Summer Olympics.

Competing for the BYU Cougars track and field team, Jenkins won the 1987 NCAA Division I Outdoor Track and Field Championships over 800 m. Before that, Jenkins ran at Adams State University and won NAIA women's outdoor track and field championship titles over 800 m and 1500 m.

== Competition record ==
Year	Competition	Venue	Position	Event	Notes
Representing United States
1990	Goodwill Games	Seattle, Washington	DQ (6th)	800 m	~~1:59.??~~
1992	Olympic Games	Barcelona, Spain	16th (sf)	800 m	2:06.53 (1:59.96 ht)
National Championships
1988	US Championships	Tampa, Florida	2nd	800 m	2:00.7
1988	US Olympic Trials	Indianapolis, Indiana	5th	800 m	2:01.62
1988	US Olympic Trials	Indianapolis, Indiana	5th	1500 m	4:06.66
1990	US Championships	Norwalk, California	2nd	800 m	2:00.91
1992	US Championships/Olympic Trials	New Orleans, Louisiana	2nd	800 m	1.59.15
1993	US Championships	Eugene, Oregon	3rd	800 m	2:02.23
1996	US Championships/Olympic Trials	Atlanta, Georgia	DNS (sf)	800 m	2:02.29 (ht)
DQ = Disqualified. Ht = heats. SF = semifinals. DNS = Did not start
