= 1994 European Athletics Indoor Championships – Women's 400 metres =

The women's 400 metres event at the 1994 European Athletics Indoor Championships was held in Palais Omnisports de Paris-Bercy on 12 and 13 March.

== Medalists ==
Gold	Silver	Bronze
Svetlana Goncharenko; Russia	Tatyana Alekseyeva; Russia	Viviane Dorsile; France

== Results ==
=== Heats ===
First 2 from each heat (Q) and the next 2 fastest (q) qualified for the final.

Rank	Heat	Name	Nationality	Time	Notes
1	1	Tatyana Alekseyeva	Russia	52.14	Q
2	2	Svetlana Goncharenko	Russia	52.19	Q
3	2	Viviane Dorsile	France	52.28	Q
4	1	Magdalena Nedelcu	Romania	53.15	Q
5	1	Kathrin Lüthi	Switzerland	53.50	q
6	2	Ionela Târlea	Romania	53.62	q
7	2	Ludmila Formanová	Czech Republic	53.67	
8	1	Naděžda Koštovalová	Czech Republic	53.71	
9	2	Regula Zürcher	Switzerland	54.07	

=== Final ===
Rank	Name	Nationality	Time	Notes
1st place, gold medalist(s)	Svetlana Goncharenko	Russia	51.62	
2nd place, silver medalist(s)	Tatyana Alekseyeva	Russia	51.77	
3rd place, bronze medalist(s)	Viviane Dorsile	France	51.92	NR
4	Ionela Târlea	Romania	53.13	
5	Magdalena Nedelcu	Romania	53.62	
6	Kathrin Lüthi	Switzerland	54.06	
