= Regula Zürcher =

Swiss athletics competitor

Personal information
- Born: 5 January 1969 (age 56)
- Height: 1.65 m (5 ft 5 in)
- Weight: 55 kg (121 lb)

Sport
- Sport: Track and field
- Event(s): 400 metres, 800 metres
- Club: LC Frauenfeld

Regula Martha Zürcher (née Scalabrin; born 5 January 1969) is retired Swiss athlete who competed primarily in the 400 metres and 800 metres. She represented her country at the 1992 Summer Olympics, as well as three outdoor and two indoor World Championships.

== Competition record ==
Year	Competition	Venue	Position	Event	Notes
Representing Switzerland
1988	World Junior Championships	Sudbury, Canada	18th (sf)	400 m	55.18
1990	European Championships	Split, Yugoslavia	25th (h)	400 m	54.88
1990	European Championships	Split, Yugoslavia	6th	4 × 400 m relay	3:29.94
1991	World Championships	Tokyo, Japan	9th (h)	4 × 400 m relay	3:30.32
1992	Olympic Games	Barcelona, Spain	9th (h)	4 × 400 m relay	3:31.26
1993	World Indoor Championships	Toronto, Canada	12th (h)	400 m	53.76
1993	World Championships	Stuttgart, Germany	19th (h)	400 m	52.84
1993	World Championships	Stuttgart, Germany	8th	4 × 400 m relay	3:28.52
1994	European Indoor Championships	Paris, France	9th (h)	400 m	54.07
1995	World Championships	Gothenburg, Sweden	30th (h)	800 m	2:05.87
1997	World Indoor Championships	Paris, France	5th (sf)	800 m	2:02.70

== Personal best ==
Outdoor

- 400 metres – 52.65 (Lausanne 1992)
- 800 metres – 2:01.67 (Rome 1997)

Indoor

- 400 metres – 52.75 (Magglingen 1994)
- 800 metres – 2:00.90 (Ghent 1997) NR
