= Letitia Vriesde =

Surinamese middle-distance runner

Personal information
- Born: Letitia Alma Vriesde; 5 October 1964 (age 61) Coronie, Suriname
- Height: 1.59 m (5 ft 3 in)
- Weight: 55 kg (121 lb)

Sport
- Sport: Athletics
- Event: 800 m – 3000 m
- Club: Atletiekvereniging Rotterdam
Medal record
Women's Athletics
Representing Suriname
World Championships
Silver medal – second place	1995 Gothenburg	800 m
Bronze medal – third place	2001 Edmonton	800 m
World Indoor Championships
Bronze medal – third place	1995 Barcelona	800 m
Grand Prix Final
Bronze medal – third place	1997 Fukuoka City	800 m
Pan American Games
Gold medal – first place	1999 Winnipeg	800 m
Silver medal – second place	1991 Havana	1500 m
Bronze medal – third place	1995 Mar del Plata	800 m
South American Championships
Gold medal – first place	2001 Manaus	1500 m
Silver medal – second place	2001 Manaus	800 m
Central American and Caribbean Games
Gold medal – first place	1990 Mexico City	1500 m
Gold medal – first place	1993 Ponce	800 m
Gold medal – first place	1993 Ponce	1500 m
Gold medal – first place	1998 Maracaibo	800 m
Gold medal – first place	2002 San Salvador	800 m
Silver medal – second place	1990 Mexico City	800 m
South American Games
Gold medal – first place	1990 Lima	800 m
Gold medal – first place	1990 Lima	1500 m
Silver medal – second place	1994 Valencia	800 m
Silver medal – second place	1994 Valencia	1500 m
Representing Americas
World Cup
Bronze medal – third place	1998 Johannesburg	800 m

Letitia Alma Vriesde (born 5 October 1964) is a former track and field athlete from Suriname, who specialised in the 800 metres but was also successful over 1500 metres. She is the first (and to date, only) sportsperson from Suriname to compete at five Olympic Games. She won a silver medal at the 1995 World Championships and a bronze medal at the 2001 World Championships. Vriesde holds the South American records for the 800 metres, 1000 metres and 1500 metres (indoors and outdoors) and also for the 3000 metres (indoors).

== Career ==
Vriesde started running in Suriname, coached by Luiz de Oliveira. She left Suriname after failing to be selected for the 1984 Olympics to train in the Netherlands. In the Netherlands, Vriesde competed for Atletiekvereniging Rotterdam.

She competed in the 800 metres at the 1988 Summer Olympics, and broke into the highest echelons of the sport in 1991, when she reached the finals of both the 800 and 1500 metres at the IAAF World Championships in Athletics in Tokyo, finishing in fifth and ninth places respectively. At the 1992 Summer Olympics Vriesde set a record of sorts by recording the fastest ever non-qualifying time (1:58.28) in an 800 metres semi-final.

Vriesde won a bronze medal in the 800 metres at the 1995 IAAF World Indoor Championships, before going on to win a silver medal at the 1995 World Championships in Athletics behind Cuba's Ana Quirot. At both competitions, she became the first South American female athlete to win a medal.

A year later, she missed the finals at the 1996 Summer Olympics, running a nearly identical time to her 1992 Olympic performance (1:58.29), again placing fifth in her semifinal. Vriesde won a bronze medal in the 800 metres at the 2001 World Championships in Athletics behind Mozambique's Maria Mutola and Austria's Stephanie Graf. Throughout her career, Vriesde also won many medals at the Pan American Games, Central American and Caribbean Games and South American Games.

Vriesde was disqualified and stripped of her gold medal at the 2003 Pan American Games after testing positive for excessive caffeine levels. She was said to have the equivalent of five gallons of coffee in her system. She was not banned however and went on to compete at that year's World Championships. Drinking too much coffee or taking a common cold tablet would no longer get athletes disqualified after a new global list of banned substances was drawn up by the World Anti-Doping Agency and applied from 1 January 2004.

Vriesde retired soon after competing at her seventh World Championships in 2005. In Paramaribo a street formerly known as Cultuurtuinlaan was changed into Letitia Vriesdelaan. The Surinamese Government also gave her a piece of land in appreciation of her achievements.

== Personal life ==
Vriesde married Bas van Veen on 9 September 2005 in Middelburg, Holland. Her daughter Joi Vienna was born on 19 March 2007.

== Personal bests ==
- 400 m 52.01 (1997)
- 800 m 1:56.68 (1995)
- 1000 m 2:32.25 (1991)
- 1500 m 4:05.67 (1991)
- Mile 4:30.45 (1992)
- 3000 m 9:15.64 (1991)

As of 2017, Vriesde's 800m best of 1:56.68 ranks her 58th on the World all-time list.

== Vriesde’s top 10 800 m performances ==
- 1:56.68 AR 2 WCh Gothenburg 13.08.95
- 1:57.07 3rA WK Zürich 16.08.95
- 1:57.09 3 Her Monte Carlo 10.08.96
- 1:57.16 4= GPF Monte Carlo 09.09.95
- 1:57.35 3 WCh Edmonton 12.08.01
- 1:57.86 4 Her Monte Carlo 16.08.97
- 1:57.96 AR 5 APM Hengelo 28.06.92
- 1:57.98 2 Nikaïa Nice 16.07.97
- 1:58.11 2 ISTAF Berlin 01.09.95
- 1:58.12 4 WCh Athens 09.08.97

== World rankings ==
Women's 800 m

- 1990 #26
- 1991 #9
- 1992 #9
- 1993 #38
- 1994 #72
- 1995 #4
- 1996 #8
- 1997 #4
- 1998 #7
- 1999 #9
- 2000 #14
- 2001 #4
- 2002 #31
- 2003 #44
- 2004 #63

Women's 1500

- 1990 #83
- 1991 #17

Women's 400 m

- 1997 #54

== Olympic Games glossary ==
=== 800 metres event history ===
- 1988 Seoul round one heat 4 4th 2:01.83
- 1988 Seoul semi-finals heat 2 8th 2:02.34
- 1992 Barcelona round one heat 3 2nd 1:59.93
- 1992 Barcelona semi-finals heat 1 5th 1:58.28
- 1996 Atlanta round one heat 1 2nd 1:59.71
- 1996 Atlanta semi-finals heat 2 5th 1:58.29
- 2000 Sydney round one heat 2 4th 2:02.09
- 2004 Athens round one heat 3 4th 2:01.70
- 2004 Athens semi-finals heat 3 8th 2:06.95

=== 1500 metres event history ===
- 1988 Seoul round one heat 2 12th 4:19.58
- 1992 Barcelona round one heat 2 5th 4:10.63
- 1992 Barcelona semi-finals heat 1 8th 4:09.64

=== Competition record ===
Year	Competition	Venue	Position	Event	Notes
Representing Suriname
1988	Olympic Games	Seoul, South Korea	14th (sf)	800 m	2:02.34
1988	Olympic Games	Seoul, South Korea	22nd (sf)	1500 m	4:19.58
1990	Central American and Caribbean Games	Mexico City, Mexico	2nd	800 m	2:04.87 A
1990	Central American and Caribbean Games	Mexico City, Mexico	1st	1500 m	4:26.28 A
1990	South American Games	Lima, Peru	1st	800 m	2:06.2
1990	South American Games	Lima, Peru	1st	1500 m	4:23.0
1991	Pan American Games	Havana, Cuba	4th	800 m	2:01.46
1991	Pan American Games	Havana, Cuba	2nd	1500 m	4:16.75
1991	World Championships	Tokyo, Japan	5th	800 m	1:58.25
1991	World Championships	Tokyo, Japan	9th	1500 m	4:05.67
1992	Olympic Games	Barcelona, Spain	5th (sf)	800 m	1:58.28
1992	Olympic Games	Barcelona, Spain	8th (sf)	1500 m	4:09.64
1993	Central American and Caribbean Games	Ponce, Puerto Rico	1st	800 m	2:04.28
1993	Central American and Caribbean Games	Ponce, Puerto Rico	1st	1500 m	4:18.45
1994	South American Games	Valencia, Venezuela	2nd	800 m	2:06.2
1994	South American Games	Valencia, Venezuela	2nd	1500 m	4:23.0
1995	World Indoor Championships	Barcelona, Spain	3rd	800 m	2:00.36
1995	Pan American Games	Mar del Plata, Argentina	3rd	800 m	2:02.25
1995	Pan American Games	Mar del Plata, Argentina	4th	1500 m	4:23.80
1995	World Championships	Gothenburg, Sweden	2nd	800 m	1:56.68
1996	Olympic Games	Atlanta, United States	7th (sf)	800 m	1:58.29
1997	World Indoor Championships	Paris, France	4th	800 m	1:59.84
1997	World Championships	Athens, Greece	4th	800 m	1:58.12
1998	Central American and Caribbean Games	Maracaibo, Venezuela	1st	800 m	2:00.24
1998	World Cup	Johannesburg, South Africa	3rd	800 m	2:00.56^{1}
1999	World Indoor Championships	Maebashi, Japan	11th (sf)	800 m	2:03.50
1999	Pan American Games	Winnipeg, Canada	1st	800 m	1:59.95
1999	World Championships	Seville, Spain	7th (sf)	800 m	2:00.33
2000	Olympic Games	Sydney, Australia	18th (h)	800 m	2:02.09
2001	South American Championships	Manaus, Brazil	2nd	800 m	2:00.93
2001	South American Championships	Manaus, Brazil	1st	1500 m	4:19.97
2001	World Championships	Edmonton, Canada	3rd	800 m	1:57.35
2002	Central American and Caribbean Games	San Salvador, El Salvador	1st	800 m	2:04.50
2003	Pan American Games	Santo Domingo, Dominican Republic	–	800 m	DQ
2003	World Championships	Paris, France	11th (sf)	800 m	2:00.88
2004	Olympic Games	Athens, Greece	24th (sf)	800 m	2:06.95
2005	World Championships	Helsinki, Finland	19th (sf)	800 m	2:02.07
Results with (h) or (sf) indicates overall position in heats or semifinals respectively.

^{1}Representing the Americas

== See also ==
- List of sportspeople sanctioned for doping offences
- List of athletes with the most appearances at Olympic Games

Awards
Preceded by Petra Kamstra	Rotterdam Sportswoman of the Year; 1991; 1995	Succeeded by Petra Kamstra
Preceded by Jacqueline Goormachtigh	Rotterdam Sportswoman of the Year; 1991; 1995	Succeeded by Francis Hoenselaar
Preceded by Ellen van Langen	KNAU Cup; 1991; 2001	Succeeded by Ellen van Langen
Preceded by Lieja Koeman	KNAU Cup; 1991; 2001	Succeeded by Jacqueline Poelman
Olympic Games
Preceded by Enrico Linscheer	Flagbearer for Suriname; Sydney 2000; Athens 2004	Succeeded by Anthony Nesty
