= Ann Williams (athlete) =

English track athlete (b.1965)

Ann Griffiths née Williams
Personal information
- Born: 20 August 1965 (age 60) St. Helens, England
- Height: 1.78 m (5 ft 10 in)
- Weight: 60 kg (130 lb)

Sport
- Sport: Athletics
- Events: 800 m, 1500 m
- Club: Sale Harriers
Medal record
Athletics
Representing England
Commonwealth Games
Silver medal – second place	1990 Auckland	800m

Ann Margaret Griffiths (née Williams; born 20 August 1965) is an English retired athlete who competed in middle-distance events. In the 800 meters, she won a silver medal at the 1990 Commonwealth Games and finished seventh in the final at the 1991 World Championships, before going on to represent Great Britain in the 1500 metres at the 1992 Summer Olympics in Barcelona.

== Biography ==
A member of Sale Harriers Manchester athletics club, Williams became the British 800 metres champion after winning the British AAA Championships title at the 1990 AAA Championships.

Williams won a silver medal for England in the 800 metres, at the 1990 Commonwealth Games in Auckland, New Zealand, in a race that was a one-two for the club, with the winner being Diane Edwards.

Williams ran under two minutes for 800m for the first time, when running 1:59.88 for fourth at the 1991 Europa Cup, to become the sixth British woman to break the two-minute barrier (after Christina Boxer, Shireen Bailey, Kirsty McDermott, Lorraine Baker and Diane Edwards). Two months later she reached the final at the 1991 World Championships in Tokyo, finishing seventh.

Williams achieved her career-best 1500m time of 4:07.59 when winning at the Golden Gala Rome Grand Prix on 9 June 1992. At the 1992 Barcelona Olympics she fell in her qualifying heat and was unfortunate to be disqualified.

Now competing under her married name Ann Griffiths, she achieved her career-best at 800m, running 1:59.81 for fifth in the final at the 1994 European Championships.

== International competitions ==
Year	Competition	Venue	Position	Event	Notes
Representing England
1990	Commonwealth Games	Auckland, New Zealand	2nd	800 m	2:00.40
Representing Great Britain
1990	European Championships	Split, Yugoslavia	15th (sf)	800 m	2:03.36
1991	European Cup	Frankfurt, Germany	4th	800 m	1:59.88
1991	World Championships	Tokyo, Japan	7th	800 m	2:01.01
1992	Olympic Games	Barcelona, Spain	heats (fell)	1500 m	DQ
1994	European Championships	Helsinki, Finland	5th	800 m	1:59.81
(sf) Indicates overall position in semifinals

=== National titles ===
- UK Championships 800 metres (1989)
- AAA Championships 800 metres (1990)
- AAA Championships 1500 metres (1991)

== Personal bests ==
Outdoor

- 800 metres – 1:59.81 (Helsinki 1994)
- 1500 metres – 4:07.59 (Rome 1992)

Indoor

- 1000 metres – 2:40.07 (Birmingham 1996)
- 1500 metres – 4:16.25 (Birmingham 1996)
