= Tudorița Chidu =

Romanian middle-distance runner (1967–2025)

Medal record

Women's athletics

Representing Romania

IAAF World Indoor Championships
Bronze medal – third place	1991 Seville	1500 m

Tudorița Chidu (17 October 1967 – 29 December 2025) was a Romanian middle-distance runner who competed in both 800 metres and 1500 metres events. Her personal bests were 1:57.64 minutes and 4:05.69 minutes, respectively. Her greatest honour was a bronze medal in the 1500 m at the IAAF World Indoor Championships in 1991.

Chidu represented Romania at the 1990 European Athletics Championships and 1991 World Championships in Athletics, and was a team bronze medallist at the 1995 IAAF World Cross Country Championships. She was an indoor specialist, appearing three times at the European Athletics Indoor Championships (best placing of fourth in 1992) and two times at the World Indoor Championships. She was the 1995 gold medallist at the Balkan Athletics Indoor Championships.

== Biography ==
Born in Amara, Romania, Chidu came to prominence in 1988 when she won the 800 m Romanian Championships in 1988 with a time of 1:57.80 minutes. Her best time that year was 1:57.64, which ranked her 14th globally for the season. On her international debut she was the fastest non-qualifier in the 800 m heats at the 1989 IAAF World Indoor Championships, coming third in her race and seventh overall. A double continental appearance came the following year and she placed fifth at the 1990 European Athletics Indoor Championships and sixth at the 1990 European Athletics Championships. Her season's best of 1:59.09 minutes set at the latter competition ranked her in the top-20 800 m athletes for that year.

Chidu switched to the 1500 m for the 1991 IAAF World Indoor Championships and the change brought her a bronze medal behind Lyudmila Rogachova and Ivana Kubešová. Her finishing time o f 4:06.27 minutes made her the third fastest indoors that season. Her first and only global outdoor appearance for Romania came at the 1991 World Championships in Athletics, but she could not progress beyond the 800 m heats. She was a guest performer at the Japan Championships in Athletics that year and topped the podium in the 1500 m. She missed a 1500 m medal by one place at the 1992 European Athletics Indoor Championships, losing to teammate Doina Melinte. She returned to that event for the 1994 edition. A gold medal came at the Balkan Athletics Indoor Championships.

The second and final global medal of Chidu's career was earned at the 1995 IAAF World Cross Country Championships. She finished the senior race in 22nd position, which was sufficient to help the Romanian women's team of Gabriela Szabo, Elena Fidatof and Iulia Negura into the bronze medal spot. Individually, she won the Chiba International Cross Country that season. She made international appearances for Romania in the ekiden road relay and won both her legs of the Yokohama International Women's Ekiden and Beijing International Women's Ekiden in 1995. Despite still being in her twenties, she did not compete at any major competitions after 1995.

Following her retirement a gymnasium in her hometown was named in her honour. Chidu died on 29 December 2025, at the age of 58.

== Personal bests ==
- 800 Metres outdoors – 1:57.64 min (1988)
- 1500 Metres outdoors – 4:05.69 min (1993)
- 800 metres indoors – 1.59.09 min (1990)
- 1500 metres indoors – 4:06.27 min (1991)

== National titles ==
- Romanian Athletics Championships
  - 800 m: 1988

== International competitions ==
Year	Competition	Venue	Position	Event	Notes
1989	World Indoor Championships	Budapest, Hungary	7th	800 m	2:02.85
1990	European Indoor Championships	Glasgow, United Kingdom	5th	800 m	2:02.88
1990	European Championships	Split, Yugoslavia	6th	800 m	1:59.09
1991	World Indoor Championships	Seville, Spain	3rd	1500 m	4:06.27
1991	World Championships	Tokyo, Japan	5th (q)	800 m	2:03.81
1992	European Indoor Championships	Genoa, Italy	4th	1500 m	4:08.30
1994	European Indoor Championships	Paris, France	7th	1500 m	4:12.13
1994	Balkan Athletics Indoor Championships	Athens, Greece	1st	1500 m	4:14.89
1995	World Cross Country Championships	Durham, United Kingdom	22nd	Senior race	21:19
1995	World Cross Country Championships	Durham, United Kingdom	3rd	Team race	84 pts
