= Mantokoane Pitso =

Lesotho middle-distance runner

Personal information
- Nationality: Lesotho
- Born: 25 May 1975
- Died: 22 January 2006 (aged 30)

Sport
- Sport: Middle-distance running
- Event: 800 metres

Mantokoane Pitso (25 May 1975 – 22 January 2006) was a Lesotho middle-distance runner. She competed in the women's 800 metres at the 1992 Summer Olympics. She was the first woman to represent Lesotho at the Olympics.
