= Gina Procaccio =

American runner (born 1964)

Personal information
- Born: July 19, 1964 (age 62) Drexel Hill, Pennsylvania, United States

Sport
- Sport: Track and field

Regina Procaccio (born July 19, 1964) is a retired American long and middle-distance runner. In 1995, she was the USATF National Champion in the indoor 5000 metres, which qualified her to run for her native country in the 1995 IAAF World Indoor Championships in Barcelona, Spain.

== Early career ==
While running for Sun Valley High School in Aston, Pennsylvania, she was a perennial second place to eventual National Recordholder Kim Gallagher who ran in the same district. "I didn't think I was any good." But by her Junior year she was second in the Pennsylvania State Championships at 800 metres. After Gallagher graduated, Procaccio won the state meet in 1982 with a personal record of 2:10.53 She continued to the University of Florida for the first three years of college, but returned to her home state. She completed her collegiate eligibility at Villanova University where she ran leadoff for the still standing Indoor 4x800 metre relay record holding team for not only the United States but the entire North America, Central America and Caribbean Athletic Association and including South America the Pan American record, while winning the NCAA Indoor Championships.

== Professional career ==
Her primary distance was the mile or its metric cousin the 1500. She ranked in the top ten of the 1500 metres in the United States six times between 1989 and 1995. She established a solid reputation in top level Miles, including defeating the standing world record holder in the mile and winning the 1500 at the Penn Relays. She placed as high as 3rd in the USA National Championships. In 1995, she expanded her range by challenging and winning the National Championship in the 5000 metres. That brought her to Europe where she challenged the top runners of the world, winning several highly competitive 3000 metre races and achieving the number one ranking that year.

== Coaching ==
After a 1995 injury suddenly curtailed her running career, Procaccio accepted an offer to assist with the women's running programs at Villanova. In 2000, she became head women's track and cross country coach. In 2009, under her leadership, the Villanova Cross Country team won the NCAA Championships. Her 2010 cross country team repeated as NCAA team champions, with Villanova's top runner Sheila Reid winning the overall individual title. It was Villanova's 9th NCAA women's cross country title, the most of any university.

== Coaching Accomplishments ==
As Villanova head coach (2000–present)

- 2 team national championships (cross country - 2009, 2010)
- 9 team Big East Conference championships
- 9 individual national champions
- 94 All-Americans
- 142 individual BIG EAST champions
- 9 Championship of America Penn Relays titles
- 2 Academic All-Americans
- 395 selections to the BIG EAST All-Academic Team
- 2 time USTFCCCA National Coach of the Year
- 6-time USTFCCCA Mid-Atlantic Region Coach of the Year
- 7 time BIG EAST Coach of the Year
- 9 NCAA Champions (as HC)
- 18 cross country All-American Awards
- 47 Indoor All-American Awards
- 18 outdoor All-American Awards

As Villanova assistant coach (1994–97, 1998–00)

- 10 NCAA individual national champions
- 8 Championship of America Penn Relays titles
- 40 All-Americans

As of Nov 2015
