= Sriyani Dhammika Menike =

Sri Lankan middle-distance runner

Personal information
- Born: 3 February 1970 (age 56)

Sport
- Sport: Athletics - High jump
Medal record
Women's athletics
Representing Sri Lanka
Asian Championships
Bronze medal – third place	1993 Manila	800 m

M. D. Sriyani Dhammika Menike (born 3 February 1970) is a former Sri Lankan female middle-distance runner. She competed in the women's 1500 metres at the 1992 Summer Olympics.

== See also ==
- Sri Lanka at the 1992 Summer Olympics
