= Lisa Lightfoot =

Australian athlete

Personal information
- Nationality: Australian
- Born: 3 December 1966 (age 59)

Sport
- Sport: Middle-distance running
- Event: 800 metres

Lisa Lightfoot (born 3 December 1966) is an Australian middle-distance runner. She competed in the women's 800 metres at the 1996 Summer Olympics.
