= Birte Bruhns =

German middle-distance runner

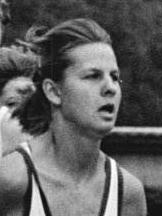
Birte Bruhns (1988)

Birte Bruhns (born 4 November 1970) is a retired German runner who specialized in the 800 metres.

She started her career at the SC Empor Rostock, after the German reunification she moved to Cologne where she represented the sports club ASV Köln, and became German champion in 1993. Her personal best time was 1:59.17 minutes, achieved in July 1988 in East Berlin.

== Achievements ==
Year	Competition	Venue	Position	Event	Notes
Representing East Germany
1987	European Junior Championships	Birmingham, England	1st	800 m	2:00.56
1987	European Junior Championships	Birmingham, England	1st	4 × 400 m relay	3:32.17
1988	World Junior Championships	Sudbury, Canada	1st	800 m	2:00.67
1989	European Junior Championships	Varaždin, Yugoslavia	1st	800 m	2:01.86
1990	European Championships	Split, Yugoslavia	12th (sf)	800m	2:01.70
