= Athletics at the 1992 Summer Olympics – Women's 800 metres =

Women's 800 metres at the Games of the XXV Olympiad
- Venue: Estadi Olímpic de Montjuïc; Barcelona, Spain
- Dates: 31 July 1992 (heats); 1 August 1992 (semi-finals); 3 August 1992 (final)
- Competitors: 36 from 25 nations
- Winning time: 1:55.54 min NR

Medalists
1st place, gold medalist(s)		Ellen van Langen	Netherlands
2nd place, silver medalist(s)		Liliya Nurutdinova	Unified Team
3rd place, bronze medalist(s)		Ana Fidelia Quirot	Cuba

The women's 800 metres at the 1992 Summer Olympics was held over three rounds at the Estadi Olímpic de Montjuïc in Barcelona, Spain, on 31 July to 3 August 1992. There were a total of 36 participating athletes, with five qualifying heats.

Eight athletes from six nations competed in the final. Ellen van Langen of the Netherlands won in a Dutch record of 1:55.54 minutes, followed by Liliya Nurutdinova of the Unified Team in second place and Ana Fidelia Quirot of Cuba in third place.

== Background ==
Favorites for the title were 1991 Tokyo World Championships gold medallist Liliya Nurutdinova for the Unified Team, Ana Quirot (Cuba), and Africa's hopeful, 19-year old Maria Mutola (Mozambique). Other potential rivals like the former East German athletes Sigrun Wodars (as Sigrun Grau, after a divorce) and Christine Wachtel, the one-two finish at the 1988 Summer Olympics in Seoul, had been eliminated in the preliminaries. The fastest semi-final was won by Nurutdinova. Dutch runner Ellen van Langen had set the fastest time of the season prior to the Games.

Global records before the 1992 Summer Olympics
Record	Athlete	Time	Location	Date
World record	(Czechoslovakia) Jarmila Kratochvílová	1:53.28	Munich, West Germany	26 July 1983
Olympic record	(Soviet Union) Nadiya Olizarenko	1:53.43	Moscow, Soviet Union	27 July 1980
World leading	(Netherlands) Ellen van Langen	1:56.66	Hengelo, Netherlands	28 June 1992

== Results ==
=== Heats ===
Thirty-six athletes from twenty-five nations competed in the heats on 31 July. Sixteen athletes, the first two in each of the five heats (Q) and the next six fastest overall (q), qualified for the semi-finals. In the first heat, R. Baguepeng Gangue of Chad was disqualified (DQ). In the third heat, Sriyani Dhammika Menike of Sri Lanka ran a national record of 2:03.85 min, but she did not advance. In the fourth heat, Carol Galea of Malta was also disqualified.

Heat 1
Rank	Athlete	Nation	Time	Notes
1	Sigrun Grau	Germany	2:00.31	Q
2	Liliya Nurutdinova	Unified Team	2:00.37	Q
3	Diane Edwards	Great Britain	2:00.39	q
4	Shiny Wilson	India	2:01.90	
5	Stella Jongmans	Netherlands	2:02.26	
6	Brigitte Nganaye	Central African Republic	2:15.70	
—	R. Baguepeng Gangue	Chad	DQ	

Heat 2
Rank	Athlete	Nation	Time	Notes
1	Joetta Clark	United States	1:59.62	Q
2	Ellen van Langen	Netherlands	1:59.86	Q
3	Carla Sacramento	Portugal	2:00.57	q
4	Christine Wachtel	Germany	2:01.39	
5	Paula Fryer	Great Britain	2:02.72	
6	Sukanya Sang-Ngeun	Thailand	2:09.94	
7	Andrea Garae	Vanuatu	2:28.61	

Heat 3
Rank	Athlete	Nation	Time	Notes
1	Ella Kovacs	Romania	1:59.88	Q
2	Letitia Vriesde	Suriname	1:59.93	Q
3	Julie Jenkins	United States	1:59.96	q
4	Sabine Zwiener	Germany	2:00.87	q
5	Fabia Trabaldo	Italy	2:01.44	
6	Sriyani Dhammika Menike	Sri Lanka	2:03.85	NR
7	Prisca Singamo	Malawi	2:20.84	

Heat 4
Rank	Athlete	Nation	Time	Notes
1	Inna Yevseyeva	Unified Team	1:58.58	Q
2	Ana Fidelia Quirot	Cuba	1:59.06	Q
3	Charmaine Crooks	Canada	1:59.52	q
4	Lorraine Baker	Great Britain	2:00.50	q
5	Leontia Sălăgeanu	Romania	2:02.65	
6	Zewdie Hailemariam	Ethiopia	2:11.60	
—	Carol Galea	Malta	DQ	

Heat 5
Rank	Athlete	Nation	Time	Notes
1	Lyubov Gurina	Unified Team	2:00.27	Q
2	Maria de Lurdes Mutola	Mozambique	2:00.83	Q
3	Meredith Rainey	United States	2:01.33	
4	Viviane Dorsile	France	2:01.54	
5	Amaia Andrés	Spain	2:02.67	
6	Gladys Wamuyu	Kenya	2:03.01	
7	Edith Nakiyingi	Uganda	2:03.55	
8	Mantokoane Pitso	Lesotho	2:29.77	

=== Semi-finals ===
Sixteen athletes from eleven nations competed in the semi-finals on 1 August. Eight athletes, the first four in each of the two semi-finals (Q), qualified for the final.

Semi-final 1
Rank	Athlete	Nation	Time	Notes
1	Liliya Nurutdinova	Unified Team	1:58.04	Q
2	Maria de Lurdes Mutola	Mozambique	1:58.16	Q
3	Inna Yevseyeva	Unified Team	1:58.20	Q
4	Joetta Clark	United States	1:58.22	Q
5	Letitia Vriesde	Suriname	1:58.28	
6	Charmaine Crooks	Canada	1:58.55	
7	Lorraine Baker	Great Britain	2:02.17	
8	Sabine Zwiener	Germany	2:02.64	

Semi-final 2
Rank	Athlete	Nation	Time	Notes
1	Lyubov Gurina	Unified Team	2:00.64	Q
2	Ellen van Langen	Netherlands	2:00.68	Q
3	Ana Fidelia Quirot	Cuba	2:00.86	Q
4	Ella Kovacs	Romania	2:00.89	Q
5	Sigrun Grau	Germany	2:00.91	
6	Carla Sacramento	Portugal	2:02.85	
7	Diane Edwards	Great Britain	2:04.32	
8	Julie Jenkins	United States	2:06.53	

=== Final ===
Eight athletes from six nations competed in the final on 3 August.

Fearing Van Langen's final sprint, her main competitor, a confident Nurutdinova, set a rapid pace, running the first lap in a very fast time of 55.73 s, with Van Langen only in 6th position. Pressured by Mutola, Quirot and Ella Kovacs (Romania), Nurutdinova led the final from the start. Entering the final stretch she had a slight lead, but Van Langen, only fifth at 600 m, moved through on the inside. With Nurutdinova moving away from the curb to block her challengers, Van Langen in the last 50 m passed – still on the inside – to win a surprise victory in a time of 1:55.54 min, beating Nurutdinova (silver) and Quirot (bronze).

Outside the medals, Maria de Lurdes Mutola of Mozambique set a national record of 1:57.49 min.

Van Langen later explained the secret of her success. "I think what I could do well is I could die very well in a race and still continue," she said. "That is very hard, because it hurts running the 800 meters. You have to overcome some boundaries in yourself to continue when it hurts like hell. I was good at it. If the Olympic race would have been run by each athlete individual and the fastest time was the winner I would not have won," she added. "I was also good in tactics, looking around me and taking the right decisions."

Rank	Athlete	Nation	Time	Notes
1st place, gold medalist(s)	Ellen van Langen	Netherlands	1:55.54	NR
2nd place, silver medalist(s)	Liliya Nurutdinova	Unified Team	1:55.99	
3rd place, bronze medalist(s)	Ana Fidelia Quirot	Cuba	1:56.80	
4	Inna Yevseyeva	Unified Team	1:57.20	
5	Maria de Lurdes Mutola	Mozambique	1:57.49	NR
6	Ella Kovacs	Romania	1:57.95	
7	Joetta Clark	United States	1:58.06	
8	Lyubov Gurina	Unified Team	1:58.13	
