= Sandra Dawson (runner) =

Australian middle-distance runner

Personal information
- Born: 2 November 1970 (age 55) Brisbane, Australia

Sport
- Sport: Track and field

Sandra Joan Dawson (born 2 November 1970) is an Australian former middle-distance runner who competed mainly in the 800 metres. She won the Australian Championships 800m title in 1994 and 1995, and reached the 800m final at the 1994 Commonwealth Games.

== International competitions ==
Year	Competition	Venue	Position	Event	Notes
Representing Australia / Oceania
1992	World Cup	Havana, Cuba	6th	800 m	2:04.73
1994	Commonwealth Games	Victoria, Canada	8th	800 m	2:04.41
1997	Summer Universiade	Catania, Italy	10th (sf)	800 m	2:04.34
(sf) Indicates overall position in semifinal round
