= Tina Paulino =

Mozambican middle-distance runner

Personal information
- Born: 7 July 1973 (age 53)
- Height: 1.66 m (5 ft 5 in)
- Weight: 61 kg (134 lb)

Sport
- Country: Mozambique
- Sport: Athletics
- Events: 400 m, 800 m

Achievements and titles
- Personal bests: 400 m: 51.82; 800 m: 1:56.62
Medal record
Women's athletics
Representing Mozambique
African Championships
Gold medal – first place	1993 Durban	400 m
Commonwealth Games
Silver medal – second place	1998 Kuala Lumpur	800 m

Argentina da Glória “Tina” Paulino (born 7 July 1973) is an 800 metres runner from Mozambique.

== Early life ==
Born in Inhambane, Tina Paulino is a distant cousin of Maria de Lurdes Mutola. She started competing in 1992 at the age of 18, having already played basketball for the national team. Stelio Craveirinha, son of the poet Jose Craveirinha and himself a former national long jump record holder, was the man responsible for introducing her to athletics. She competed in a number of road races, but there was no track competition for her in Mozambique. Craveirinha, however, managed to convince the National Olympic Committee to send her to Portugal on a training camp. Her results were impressive given the short time that she had been running seriously: she won the Portuguese national 800 m title in a time of 2:03.84, faster than Mutola ran in her first race outside of Mozambique.

== Career ==
In 1993, after a string of victories on the South African circuit, Tina stunned athletics observers by running 1:56.62 in a race won by cousin Mutola in 1:56.56. Both runners beat Mutola’s week-old African record. In the World Championship final of that year, held in Stuttgart she was unfortunate to fall over when challenging for a medal.

From 1995, Tina benefited from the ‘Atlanta ‘96’ IOC Solidarity Programme, an initiative designed to boost the Olympic preparations of carefully selected athletes from developing nations. Tina and eleven other athletes, including Tommy Asinga, Sipho Dlamini, Ngozi Mwanamwambwa and Marie Womplou, trained under the guidance of coach Ron Davis while attending LaGrange College at LaGrange, seventy miles southwest of Atlanta, where they enjoyed state-of-the-art facilities and equipment, including a new $400 000 track. Despite developing an infection during a tooth extraction, Tina managed to reach the IAAF ‘A’ standard and thus fulfilled the criteria for competing in the IAAF World Championships in Athletics in Gothenburg, where she reached the semi-finals. Unfortunately she did not achieve the qualifying standard for the following year’s Olympic Games.

In May 1997 Tina followed the Olympic Solidarity Programme as it moved from LaGrange to Savannah. In Savannah she attended and graduated from Armstrong Atlantic State University with BA in English Literature. Here, Dieudonne Kwizera and Abdi Bile coached her to eventual silver at the Commonwealth Games in Kuala Lumpur in 1998. The following year, 1999, seemed to see a consolidation of the good form Tina had displayed in Malaysia. After elimination during the first round of the World Indoors in Japan, she scored victories at the Brazilian Grand Prix, the Mt San Antonio College Relays, the Oregon Track Classic and the Harry Jerome Classic. She also had solid runs in Eugene and St. Louis. However, the Savannah International Training Centre closed its doors in late 1999, amidst claims that the IOC had failed to meet its obligations to provide enough athletes to keep the facilities open.

Tina also worked with Luiz de Oliveira in Tucson, Arizona. The Brazilian coached the 800 m stars Joaquim Cruz and Jose Luis Barbosa, as well as Osmar dos Santos and Hudson de Souza. He also coached David Krummenacker and Patrick Nduwimana. In 2002, she went to the Centro Nacional de Treinamento de Atletismo in Manaus, where she achieved her best mark of that season: 2:01.25. The rest of the season was quiet – with the exception of a few low-key meetings in Italy she did not compete in Europe. She also failed to contest the Commonwealth Games in Manchester.

== Later career ==
From late 2002 Tina was based in Rovereto in Italy and competed for the Italian club US Quercia Marsili. She was also coached by Margo Fund. She qualified for the 2003 World Championships thanks to the fact that Mutola, as defending champion, received automatic entry. After an impressive first-round victory, she failed to progress beyond the semi-finals. By now, Tina had established herself as a regular pacemaker in both 800 m and 1500 m races on the European circuit. In 2004, however, her regular appearances as a pacemaker meant that she had few occasions to attempt to meet the strict Olympic qualifying standards. After a promising early-season 2:00.96 in Brazil, her marks became slower and slower. Her final opportunity to reach the required two-minute mark, the Iberoamerican Games in Huelva in August, resulted in disaster – she failed to even qualify for the games final.

2005 started inauspiciously – with slow times outside 2:15.
