= Ella Kovacs =

Romanian middle-distance runner

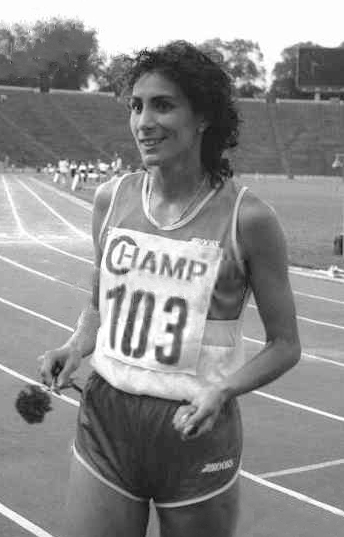
- Kovacs in 1992

Personal information
- Born: 11 December 1964 (age 61) Luduş, Romania
- Height: 170 cm (5 ft 7 in)
- Weight: 55 kg (121 lb)

Sport
- Sport: Athletics
- Event: 800–1500 m

Achievements and titles
- Personal bests: 800 m – 1:55.68 (1985); 1000 m – 2:32.40 (1993); 1500 m – 4:07.4 (1990)
Medal record
Representing Romania
World Championships
Bronze medal – third place	1991 Tokyo	800m
Bronze medal – third place	1993 Stuttgart	800m
World Indoor Championships
Bronze medal – third place	1991 Seville	800m
European Indoor Championships
Gold medal – first place	1985 Athens	800m
Gold medal – first place	1992 Genoa	800m
Silver medal – second place	1994 Paris	800m

Ella Kovacs (born 11 December 1964) is a retired Romanian middle-distance runner of Hungarian descent who specialized in the 800 metres. She won World Championship bronze medals in 1991 and 1993, and won the European Indoor Championship title in 1985 and 1992. She also finished sixth in the 800 m final at the 1992 Olympics. Her 800 m best of 1:55.68, was the fastest time in the world in 1985, and ranks second to Doina Melinte on the Romanian all-time list.

== Achievements ==
Year	Competition	Venue	Position	Event	Notes
Representing Romania
1985	European Indoor Championships	Athens, Greece	1st	800 m	2:00.51
1990	European Championships	Split, Yugoslavia	5th	800 m	1:58.33
1991	World Indoor Championships	Seville, Spain	3rd	800 m	2:01.79
	World Championships	Tokyo, Japan	3rd	800 m	1:57.58
1992	European Indoor Championships	Genoa, Italy	1st	800 m	1:59.98
1992	Olympic Games	Barcelona, Spain	6th	800 m	1:57.95
1992	World Cup	Havana, Cuba	4th	800 m	2:03.05
1993	World Championships	Stuttgart, Germany	3rd	800 m	1:57.92
1994	European Indoor Championships	Paris, France	2nd	800 m	2:00.49
1994	Goodwill Games	Saint Petersburg, Russia	DNF	800 m	—
