= 1997 IAAF Grand Prix =

- Edition: 13th
- Dates: 20 February – 20 September
- Meetings: 26 (+1 final)

The 1997 IAAF Grand Prix was the thirteenth edition of the annual global series of one-day track and field competitions organized by the International Association of Athletics Federations (IAAF). The series consisted of three levels: IAAF Grand Prix, IAAF Grand Prix II, and finally IAAF Permit Meetings. There were seventeen Grand Prix meetings and ten Grand Prix II meetings, making a combined total of 27 meetings for the series from 20 February to 20 September. An additional 12 IAAF Outdoor Permit Meetings were attached to the circuit.

Performances on designated events on the circuit earned athletes points which qualified them for entry to the 1997 IAAF Grand Prix Final, held on 13 September in Fukuoka, Japan. Danish-Kenyan runner Wilson Kipketer was the winner of the overall men's title with 114 points, while Germany's Astrid Kumbernuss topped the women's rankings with 99 points in the discus throw.

== Meetings ==
Key: Non-Grand Prix, scoring meeting

#	Date	Meeting name	City	Country	Level
1	20 February	Melbourne Track Classic	Melbourne	Australia	IAAF Grand Prix II
2	2 April	All Africa Invitational	Pretoria	South Africa	IAAF Grand Prix II
—	8 April	Engen Grand Prix Final	Cape Town	South Africa	IAAF Permit Meeting
—	1 May	Memorial Marie Perrine	Fort-de-France	Martinique	IAAF Permit Meeting
3	4 May	Grand Prix Brasil de Atletismo	Rio de Janeiro	Brazil	IAAF Grand Prix I
4	10 May	Japan Grand Prix	Osaka	Japan	IAAF Grand Prix I
—	18 May	Harry Jerome Track Classic	Vancouver	Canada	IAAF Permit Meeting
5	25 May	Prefontaine Classic	Eugene	United States	IAAF Grand Prix I
6	29 May	Gran Premio Diputacion	Seville	Spain	IAAF Grand Prix II
7	31 May	Adriaan Paulen Memorial	Hengelo	Netherlands	IAAF Grand Prix II
8	2 June	St Denis – l'Humanité	Saint-Denis	France	IAAF Grand Prix II
9	5 June	Golden Gala	Rome	Italy	IAAF Grand Prix I
10	8 June	Brothers Znamensky Memorial	Moscow	Russia	IAAF Grand Prix I
11	10 June	Slovnaft Meeting	Bratislava	Slovakia	IAAF Grand Prix II
—	13 June	Live Nuremberg	Nuremberg	Germany	IAAF Permit Meeting
12	18 June	World Games Helsinki	Helsinki	Finland	IAAF Grand Prix II
—	24 June	Meeting di Atletica Leggera Torino	Turin	Italy	IAAF Permit Meeting
13	25 June	Meeting Gaz de France	Paris	France	IAAF Grand Prix I
—	29 June	Meeting Lille-Métropole	Lille	France	IAAF Permit Meeting
14	29 June	British Grand Prix	Sheffield	United Kingdom	IAAF Grand Prix I
15	2 July	Athletissima	Lausanne	Switzerland	IAAF Grand Prix I
16	4 July	Bislett Games	Oslo	Norway	IAAF Grand Prix I
17	7 July	DN Galan	Stockholm	Sweden	IAAF Grand Prix I
18	9 July	Zipfer Gugl Grand Prix	Linz	Austria	IAAF Grand Prix II
19	16 July	Nikaia	Nice	France	IAAF Grand Prix I
—	19 July	Meeting Internazionale del Sestriere	Sestriere	Italy	IAAF Permit Meeting
—	20 July	International Meeting Budapest	Budapest	Hungary	IAAF Permit Meeting
20	13 August	Weltklasse Zürich	Zürich	Switzerland	IAAF Grand Prix I
21	16 August	Herculis	Monte Carlo	Monaco	IAAF Grand Prix I
22	22 August	Memorial Van Damme	Brussels	Belgium	IAAF Grand Prix I
23	24 August	Weltklasse in Köln	Cologne	Germany	IAAF Grand Prix I
24	26 August	ISTAF Berlin	Berlin	Germany	IAAF Grand Prix I
25	3 September	Rieti Meeting	Rieti	Italy	IAAF Grand Prix II
—	5 September	Meeting de Atletismo Madrid	Madrid	Spain	IAAF Permit Meeting
—	6 September	Toto International Super Meeting	Tokyo	Japan	IAAF Permit Meeting
26	7 September	BUPA Games Grand Prix II	Gateshead	United Kingdom	IAAF Grand Prix II
F	13 September	1997 IAAF Grand Prix Final	Fukuoka	Japan	IAAF Grand Prix Final
—	16 September	ITC International Meeting	New Delhi	India	IAAF Permit Meeting
—	20 September	Bob Hasan Invitational	Jakarta	Indonesia	IAAF Permit Meeting

== Points standings ==
=== Overall men ===
Rank	Athlete	Nation	Meets	Points
1	Wilson Kipketer	Denmark (DEN)		114.0
2	Lars Riedel	Germany (GER)	8	99.0
3	Mark Crear	United States (USA)	8	95.0
4	Hicham El Guerrouj	Morocco (MAR)	8	93.0
5	Moses Kiptanui	Kenya (KEN)	8	88.0
6	Daniel Komen	Kenya (KEN)	8	86.0
7	Jan Železný	Czech Republic (CZE)	8	85.0
8	James Beckford	Jamaica (JAM)	8	85.0
9	Boris Henry	Germany (GER)	8	82.0
10	Maksim Tarasov	Russia (RUS)	8	79.0
11	Bernard Barmasai	Kenya (KEN)	8	76.0
12	Tony Jarrett	Great Britain (GBR)	8	69.0
13	Frankie Fredericks	Namibia (NAM)	5	68.0
13	Allen Johnson	United States (USA)	8	68.0
15	Tom Nyariki	Kenya (KEN)	8	66.0
16	William Tanui	Kenya (KEN)	8	65.0
16	Virgilijus Alekna	Lithuania (LIT)	7	65.0
18	Sergey Makarov	Russia (RUS)	8	64.0
19	Adam Setliff	United States (USA)	7	63.0
20	Steve Backley	Great Britain (GBR)	8	62.0
20	Vénuste Niyongabo	Burkina Faso (BUR)	7	62.0
22	Igor Kováč	Slovakia (SVK)	8	61.0
22	Iván Pedroso	Cuba (CUB)	4	61.0
24	Jürgen Schult	Germany (GER)	8	60.0
24	Patrick Ndururi	Kenya (KEN)	7	60.0
24	Pat Manson	United States (USA)	8	60.0
24	Khalid Boulami	Morocco (MAR)	5	60.0
28	Jon Drummond	United States (USA)	5	59.0
29	Rich Kenah	United States (USA)	8	58.0
30	Sergei Bubka	Ukraine (UKR)	4	57.5
31	Haile Gebrselassie	Ethiopia (ETH)	5	57.0
31	Eliud Barngetuny	Kenya (KEN)	8	57.0
33	Tom Pukstys	United States (USA)	8	56.0
34	Laban Rotich	Kenya (KEN)	6	55.0
34	Patrik Bodén	Sweden (SWE)	7	55.0
36	Florian Schwarthoff	Germany (GER)	8	54.5
37	Kirill Sosunov	Russia (RUS)	6	54.0
38	Paul Koech	Kenya (KEN)	6	52.0
39	Ato Boldon	Trinidad and Tobago (TRI)	5	50.0
39	Wilson Boit Kipketer	Kenya (KEN)	6	50.0
41	Obadele Thompson	Barbados (BAR)	5	49.0
41	Jack Pierce	United States (USA)	8	49.0
43	Mick Hill	Great Britain (GBR)	7	48.0
43	Marko Koers	Netherlands (NED)	8	48.0
45	Tim Lobinger	Germany (GER)	8	47.8
46	Scott Huffman	United States (USA)	8	47.3
47	Geir Moen	Norway (NOR)	7	47.0
48	John Godina	United States (USA)	5	46.0
48	Paul Bitok	Kenya (KEN)	7	46.0
48	Kevin Little	United States (USA)	8	46.0
51	Andreas Seelig	Germany (GER)	8	45.0
51	Terry Reese	United States (USA)	8	45.0
51	Patrick Sang	Kenya (KEN)	8	45.0
54	Dmitri Markov	Belarus (BLR)	8	44.5
54	Lawrence Johnson	United States (USA)	7	44.5
56	Patrick Stevens	Belgium (BEL)	8	44.0
56	Erick Walder	United States (USA)	4	44.0
58	David Kiptoo	Kenya (KEN)	7	43.0
58	Hezekiél Sepeng	South Africa (RSA)	8	43.0
60	Robert Kiplagat Andersen	Denmark (DEN)	5	41.0
61	Rohsaan Griffin	United States (USA)	7	40.0
62	Ismaïl Sghyr	Morocco (MAR)	6	39.0
62	Vincent Malakwen	Kenya (KEN)	7	39.0
64	John Kibowen	Kenya (KEN)	6	38.0
65	Anier García	Cuba (CUB)	6	37.0
65	Colin Jackson	Great Britain (GBR)	8	37.0
67	Sean Robbins	United States (USA)	7	36.0
67	Mohammed Mourhit	Belgium (BEL)	6	36.0
69	Joseph Keter	Kenya (KEN)	4	35.0
69	Roland McGhee	United States (USA)	4	35.0
71	Riaan Botha	South Africa (RSA)	6	34.8
72	Patrick Konchellah	Kenya (KEN)	6	34.0
73	Juha Laukkanen	Finland (FIN)	6	32.0
74	Steve Holman	United States (USA)	8	31.0
74	Roger Kingdom	United States (USA)	7	31.0
74	Vebjørn Rodal	Norway (NOR)	6	31.0
77	Anthony Whiteman	Great Britain (GBR)	4	28.0
78	Okkert Brits	South Africa (RSA)	5	27.3
79	Raymond Hecht	Germany (GER)	6	27.0
79	Aki Parviainen	Finland (FIN)	6	27.0
81	Assefa Mezgebu	Ethiopia (ETH)	4	26.0
82	Cheikh Touré	Senegal (SEN)	3	25.0
82	Salah Hissou	Morocco (MAR)	4	25.0
82	Vasiliy Kaptyukh	Belarus (BLR)	4	25.0
85	Jean Galfione	France (FRA)	4	24.5
86	Bob Kennedy	United States (USA)	5	24.0
86	Elijah Maru	Kenya (KEN)	5	24.0
88	Michael Möllenbeck	Germany (GER)	6	23.0
88	Paul Tergat	Kenya (KEN)	3	23.0
88	Mark Everett	United States (USA)	3	23.0
91	Igor Potapovich	Kazakhstan (KAZ)	6	22.0
91	Aleksandr Glavatskiy	Belarus (BLR)	4	22.0
93	Courtney Hawkins	United States (USA)	4	21.0
93	Dieter Baumann	Germany (GER)	5	21.0
93	Frederick Onyancha	Kenya (KEN)	6	21.0
96	John Mayock	Great Britain (GBR)	5	20.0
97	Troy Douglas	Bermuda (BER)	4	18.0
97	Fermín Cacho	Spain (ESP)	4	18.0
97	Michael Johnson	United States (USA)	2	18.0
97	Viktor Chistiakov	Russia (RUS)	6	18.0

=== Overall women ===
Rank	Athlete	Nation	Meets	Points
1	Astrid Kumbernuss	Germany (GER)	8	99.0
2	Deon Hemmings	Jamaica (JAM)	8	93.0
3	Kim Batten	United States (USA)	8	91.0
4	Inha Babakova	Ukraine (UKR)	8	90.0
5	Šárka Kašpárková	Czech Republic (CZE)	8	87.0
6	Ashia Hansen	Great Britain (GBR)	8	79.0
7	Ana Fidelia Quirot	Cuba (CUB)	7	79.0
8	Maria Mutola	Mozambique (MOZ)	6	73.0
9	Yelena Afanasyeva	Russia (RUS)	8	72.0
10	Tatyana Tereshchuk	Ukraine (UKR)	8	70.0
11	Lydia Cheromei	Kenya (KEN)	6	65.0
12	Hanne Haugland	Norway (NOR)	8	63.5
13	Marion Jones	United States (USA)	4	63.0
14	Monica Iagăr	Romania (ROM)	8	62.5
15	Amy Acuff	United States (USA)	8	61.0
16	Carla Sacramento	Portugal (POR)	7	60.0
17	Yuliya Lyakhova	Russia (RUS)	8	57.5
18	Rodica Mateescu	Romania (ROM)	5	57.0
19	Sally Barsosio	Kenya (KEN)	5	56.0
19	Olena Hovorova	Ukraine (UKR)	8	56.0
21	Debbie-Ann Parris	Jamaica (JAM)	8	53.0
21	Vita Pavlysh	Ukraine (UKR)	4	53.0
21	Stephanie Storp	Germany (GER)	8	53.0
24	Melinda Gainsford-Taylor	Australia (AUS)	5	52.0
24	Suzy Favor Hamilton	United States (USA)	5	52.0
26	Marina Trandenkova	Russia (RUS)	6	50.0
26	Jearl Miles Clark	United States (USA)	6	50.0
26	Inger Miller	United States (USA)	5	50.0
29	Nezha Bidouane	Morocco (MAR)	7	49.0
29	Ludmila Formanová	Czech Republic (CZE)	8	49.0
31	Juliet Campbell	Jamaica (JAM)	8	48.0
32	Irina Korzhanenko	Russia (RUS)	5	47.0
32	Merlene Ottey	Jamaica (JAM)	4	47.0
34	Alina Astafei	Germany (GER)	7	46.5
35	Olga Kaliturina	Russia (RUS)	8	45.5
36	Juliet Cuthbert	Jamaica (JAM)	7	45.0
36	Paula Radcliffe	Great Britain (GBR)	5	45.0
36	Gabriela Szabo	Romania (ROM)	5	45.0
39	Letitia Vriesde	Suriname (SUR)	6	44.0
40	Connie Price-Smith	United States (USA)	5	43.0
41	Tonja Buford-Bailey	United States (USA)	6	42.0
42	Huang Zhihong	China (CHN)	4	41.0
43	Jackline Maranga	Kenya (KEN)	5	39.0
44	Valentina Fedyushina	Ukraine (UKR)	7	38.0
44	Roberta Brunet	Italy (ITA)	6	38.0
46	Tatyana Motkova	Russia (RUS)	7	37.5
47	Guðrún Arnardóttir	Iceland (ISL)	7	36.0
47	Joetta Clark	United States (USA)	7	36.0
49	Galina Chistyakova	Slovakia (SVK)	7	35.0
49	Anna Knoroz	Russia (RUS)	8	35.0
51	Berhane Adere	Ethiopia (ETH)	4	34.0
52	Viktoriya Fyodorova	Russia (RUS)	7	32.5
53	Judy Oakes	Great Britain (GBR)	5	32.0
54	Julie Henner	United States (USA)	4	30.0
54	Irina Samorokova-Biryukova	Russia (RUS)	5	30.0
56	Zahra Ouaziz	Morocco (MAR)	5	29.0
57	Lyudmila Borisova	Russia (RUS)	4	28.0
58	Cynthea Rhodes	United States (USA)	7	27.0
58	Gete Wami	Ethiopia (ETH)	5	27.0
58	Merima Denboba	Ethiopia (ETH)	6	27.0
61	Theresia Kiesl	Austria (AUT)	6	26.0
61	Susan Smith	Ireland (IRL)	8	26.0
61	Natalya Dukhnova	Belarus (BLR)	6	26.0
64	Fernanda Ribeiro	Portugal (POR)	3	25.0
65	Merlene Frazer	Jamaica (JAM)	4	24.0
66	Sonia O'Sullivan	Ireland (IRL)	4	23.0
67	Yelena Donkina	Russia (RUS)	3	22.0
67	Rebecca Russell-Buchanan	United States (USA)	6	22.0
67	Lidia Chojecka	Poland (POL)	3	22.0
70	Anita Weyermann	Switzerland (SUI)	4	21.0
71	Cathy Freeman	Australia (AUS)	4	20.0
71	Sally Gunnell	Great Britain (GBR)	4	20.0
71	Svetlana Krivelyova	Russia (RUS)	6	20.0
71	Tereza Marinova	Bulgaria (BUL)	4	20.0
75	Kelly Holmes	Great Britain (GBR)	2	18.0
76	Leah Pells	Canada (CAN)	3	17.0
77	Toni Hodgkinson	New Zealand (NZL)	4	16.0
78	Valeyta Althouse	United States (USA)	3	15.0
78	Hassiba Boulmerka	Algeria (ALG)	4	15.0
78	Inessa Kravets	Ukraine (UKR)	3	15.0
78	Svetlana Masterkova	Russia (RUS)	2	15.0
82	Stefka Kostadinova	Bulgaria (BUL)	2	14.5
83	Zhanna Pintusevich	Ukraine (UKR)	3	14.0
83	Regina Jacobs	United States (USA)	3	14.0
83	Leah Malot	Kenya (KEN)	3	14.0
83	Trevaia Williams	United States (USA)	3	14.0
83	Nadine Kleinert	Germany (GER)	4	14.0
83	Michelle DiMuro	United States (USA)	4	14.0
83	Andrea Blackett	Barbados (BAR)	4	14.0
90	Amy Wickus	United States (USA)	4	13.5
91	Amy Rudolph	United States (USA)	2	13.0
91	Irina Khudoroshkina	Russia (RUS)	5	13.0
91	Chryste Gaines	United States (USA)	3	13.0
94	Marina Bastos	Portugal (POR)	3	12.0
94	Linda Kisabaka	Germany (GER)	4	12.0
94	Silvia Rieger	Germany (GER)	3	12.0
94	Sui Xinmei	Switzerland (SUI)	3	12.0
94	Luciana Mendes	Brazil (BRA)	2	12.0
99	Yekaterina Podkopayeva	Russia (RUS)	3	11.0
99	Kathy Butler	Canada (CAN)	3	11.0
99	Donalda Duprey	Canada (CAN)	3	11.0
99	Inez Turner	Jamaica (JAM)	2	11.0
99	Harumi Hiroyama	Japan (JPN)	2	11.0
99	Masako Chiba	Japan (JPN)	1	11.0
