= 400 metres hurdles at the World Athletics Championships =

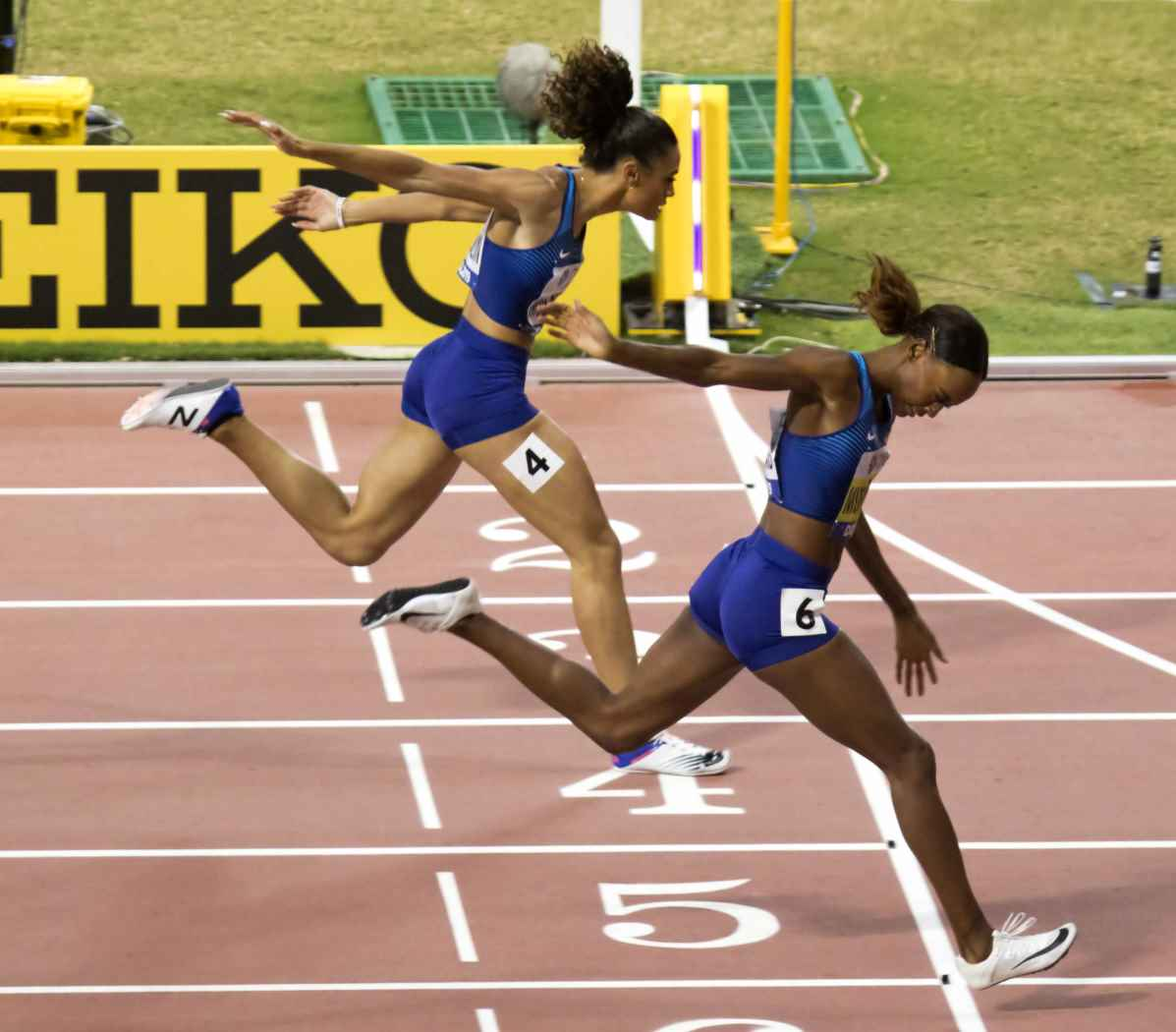
- The finish of the 2019 women's final.

Overview
- Gender: Men and women
- Years held: Men: 1983 – 2025; Women: 1980 – 2025

Championship record
- Men: 46.29 Alison dos Santos (2022)
- Women: 50.68 Sydney McLaughlin (2022)

Reigning champion
- Men: Rai Benjamin (USA)
- Women: Femke Bol (NED)

The 400 metres hurdles at the World Championships in Athletics has been contested by women since 1980 and by men since 1983.

Karsten Warholm is the most successful athlete in the history of the event, winning three medals between 2017 and 2023. Félix Sánchez is the second most successful athlete, winning two gold medals and one silver medal between 2001 and 2007. Nezha Bidouane has the same medal tally as Sanchez and is the most successful female athlete, winning two golds and one silver between 1997 and 2001. Yuliya Pechonkina, Lashinda Demus and Dalilah Muhammad have won the most medals in the event, with four total; all won one gold, two silver and one bronze.

The United States is the most successful nation in the discipline, winning 7 gold medals in the men's discipline, 5 gold medals in the women's discipline and 39 medals in total. Great Britain is the only other nation that has won gold in both the men's and the women's event, winning gold in the women's event in 1993 and gold in the men's event in 2011.

The championship records for the event are 46.29 for men, set by Alison dos Santos in 2022, and 50.68 s for women, set by Sydney McLaughlin, also in 2022. The women's world record has been broken four times at the World Championships: by Sally Gunnell in 1993, Kim Batten in 1995, Dalilah Muhammad in 2019, and Sydney McLaughlin in 2022. The men's world record has never been broken at the competition.

== Age records ==
- All information from World Athletics.

Distinction	Male			Female		
Distinction	Athlete	Age	Date	Athlete	Age	Date
Youngest champion	Karsten Warholm (NOR)	21 years, 165 days	9 Aug 2017	Jana Pittman (AUS)	20 years, 292 days	15 Aug 2003
Youngest medalist	Llewellyn Herbert (RSA)	20 years, 14 days	4 Aug 1997	Petra Pfaff (GDR)	19 years, 305 days	16 Aug 1980
Youngest finalist	Jehue Gordon (TTO)	17 years, 246 days	18 Aug 2009	Esther Mahr (USA)	19 years, 137 days	16 Aug 1980
Youngest participant	Jehue Gordon (TTO)	17 years, 243 days	15 Aug 2009	Mirenda Francourt (SEY)	16 years, 99 days	26 Aug 1991
Oldest champion	Edwin Moses (USA)	32 years, 1 day	1 Sep 1987	Nezha Bidouane (MAR)	31 years, 324 days	8 Aug 2001
Oldest medalist	Kriss Akabusi (GBR)	32 years, 272 days	27 Aug 1991	Sandra Glover (USA)	36 years, 226 days	13 Aug 2005
Oldest finalist	Danny McFarlane (JAM)	37 years, 185 days	18 Aug 2009	Sandra Glover (USA)	36 years, 226 days	13 Aug 2005
Oldest participant	Mahau Suguimati (BRA)	37 years, 245 days	16 July 2022	Tetyana Tereshchuk-Antipova (UKR)	37 years, 321 days	28 Aug 2007

== Medalists ==
=== Men ===
Championships	Gold	Silver	Bronze
1983 Helsinki	Edwin Moses (USA)	Harald Schmid (FRG)	Aleksandr Kharlov (URS)
1987 Rome	Edwin Moses (USA)	Danny Harris (USA)	Harald Schmid (FRG)
1991 Tokyo	Samuel Matete (ZAM)	Winthrop Graham (JAM)	Kriss Akabusi (GBR)
1993 Stuttgart	Kevin Young (USA)	Samuel Matete (ZAM)	Winthrop Graham (JAM)
1995 Gothenburg	Derrick Adkins (USA)	Samuel Matete (ZAM)	Stéphane Diagana (FRA)
1997 Athens	Stéphane Diagana (FRA)	Llewellyn Herbert (RSA)	Bryan Bronson (USA)
1999 Seville	Fabrizio Mori (ITA)	Stéphane Diagana (FRA)	Marcel Schelbert (SUI)
2001 Edmonton	Félix Sánchez (DOM)	Fabrizio Mori (ITA)	Dai Tamesue (JPN)
2003 Saint-Denis	Félix Sánchez (DOM)	Joey Woody (USA)	Periklis Iakovakis (GRE)
2005 Helsinki	Bershawn Jackson (USA)	James Carter (USA)	Dai Tamesue (JPN)
2007 Osaka	Kerron Clement (USA)	Félix Sánchez (DOM)	Marek Plawgo (POL)
2009 Berlin	Kerron Clement (USA)	Javier Culson (PUR)	Bershawn Jackson (USA)
2011 Daegu	Dai Greene (GBR)	Javier Culson (PUR)	L. J. van Zyl (RSA)
2013 Moscow	Jehue Gordon (TRI)	Michael Tinsley (USA)	Emir Bekrić (SRB)
2015 Beijing	Nicholas Bett (KEN)	Denis Kudryavtsev (RUS)	Jeffery Gibson (BAH)
2017 London	Karsten Warholm (NOR)	Yasmani Copello (TUR)	Kerron Clement (USA)
2019 Doha	Karsten Warholm (NOR)	Rai Benjamin (USA)	Abderrahman Samba (QAT)
2022 Eugene	Alison dos Santos (BRA)	Rai Benjamin (USA)	Trevor Bassitt (USA)
2023 Budapest	Karsten Warholm (NOR)	Kyron McMaster (BVI)	Rai Benjamin (USA)
2025 Tokyo	Rai Benjamin (USA)	Alison dos Santos (BRA)	Abderrahman Samba (QAT)

==== Medal table ====
Rank	Nation	Gold	Silver	Bronze	Total
1	United States (USA)	8	6	5	19
2	Norway (NOR)	3	0	0	3
3	Dominican Republic (DOM)	2	1	0	3
4	Zambia (ZAM)	1	2	0	3
5	France (FRA)	1	1	1	3
6	Brazil (BRA)	1	1	0	2
6	Italy (ITA)	1	1	0	2
8	Great Britain (GBR)	1	0	1	2
9	Kenya (KEN)	1	0	0	1
9	Trinidad and Tobago (TTO)	1	0	0	1
11	Puerto Rico (PUR)	0	2	0	2
12	Germany (GER)	0	1	1	2
12	Jamaica (JAM)	0	1	1	2
12	South Africa (RSA)	0	1	1	2
15	British Virgin Islands (BVI)	0	1	0	1
15	Russia (RUS)	0	1	0	1
15	Turkey (TUR)	0	1	0	1
18	Japan (JPN)	0	0	2	2
18	Qatar (QAT)	0	0	2	2
20	Bahamas (BAH)	0	0	1	1
20	Greece (GRE)	0	0	1	1
20	Poland (POL)	0	0	1	1
20	Serbia (SRB)	0	0	1	1
20	Soviet Union (URS)	0	0	1	1
20	Switzerland (SUI)	0	0	1	1
Totals (25 entries)		20	20	20	60

==== Multiple medalists ====
Rank	Athlete	Nation	Period	Gold	Silver	Bronze	Total
1	Karsten Warholm	Norway (NOR)	2017–2023	3	0	0	3
2	Félix Sánchez	Dominican Republic (DOM)	2001–2007	2	1	0	3
3	Edwin Moses	United States (USA)	1983–1987	2	0	0	2
3	Kerron Clement	United States (USA)	2007–2009	2	0	0	2
5	Rai Benjamin	United States (USA)	2019-2025	1	2	1	4
6	Samuel Matete	Zambia (ZAM)	1991–1995	1	2	0	3
7	Stéphane Diagana	France (FRA)	1995–1999	1	1	1	3
8	Fabrizio Mori	Italy (ITA)	1999–2001	1	1	0	2
8	Alison dos Santos	Brazil (BRA)	2022-2025	1	1	0	2
10	Bershawn Jackson	United States (USA)	2005–2009	1	0	1	2
11	Javier Culson	Puerto Rico (PUR)	2009–2011	0	2	0	2
12	Harald Schmid	West Germany (FRG)	1983–1987	0	1	1	2
12	Winthrop Graham	Jamaica (JAM)	1991–1993	0	1	1	2
13	Dai Tamesue	Japan (JPN)	2001–2005	0	0	2	2
13	Abderrahman Samba	Qatar (QAT)	2019-2025	0	0	2	2

=== Women ===
Championships	Gold	Silver	Bronze
1980 Sittard	Bärbel Broschat (GDR)	Ellen Neumann (GDR)	Petra Pfaff (GDR)
1983 Helsinki	Yekaterina Fesenko (URS)	Ana Ambrazienė (URS)	Ellen Neumann-Fiedler (GDR)
1987 Rome	Sabine Busch (GDR)	Debbie Flintoff (AUS)	Cornelia Feuerbach (GDR)
1991 Tokyo	Tatyana Ledovskaya (URS)	Sally Gunnell (GBR)	Janeene Vickers (USA)
1993 Stuttgart	Sally Gunnell (GBR)	Sandra Farmer-Patrick (USA)	Margarita Ponomaryova (RUS)
1995 Gothenburg	Kim Batten (USA)	Tonja Buford (USA)	Deon Hemmings (JAM)
1997 Athens	Nezha Bidouane (MAR)	Deon Hemmings (JAM)	Kim Batten (USA)
1999 Seville	Daimí Pernía (CUB)	Nezha Bidouane (MAR)	Deon Hemmings (JAM)
2001 Edmonton	Nezha Bidouane (MAR)	Yuliya Pechonkina (RUS)	Daimí Pernía (CUB)
2003 Saint-Denis	Jana Pittman (AUS)	Sandra Glover (USA)	Yuliya Pechonkina (RUS)
2005 Helsinki	Yuliya Pechonkina (RUS)	Lashinda Demus (USA)	Sandra Glover (USA)
2007 Osaka	Jana Rawlinson (AUS)	Yuliya Pechenkina (RUS)	Anna Jesień (POL)
2009 Berlin	Melaine Walker (JAM)	Lashinda Demus (USA)	Josanne Lucas (TRI)
2011 Daegu	Lashinda Demus (USA)	Melaine Walker (JAM)	Natalya Antyukh (RUS)
2013 Moscow	Zuzana Hejnová (CZE)	Dalilah Muhammad (USA)	Lashinda Demus (USA)
2015 Beijing	Zuzana Hejnová (CZE)	Shamier Little (USA)	Cassandra Tate (USA)
2017 London	Kori Carter (USA)	Dalilah Muhammad (USA)	Ristananna Tracey (JAM)
2019 Doha	Dalilah Muhammad (USA)	Sydney McLaughlin (USA)	Rushell Clayton (JAM)
2022 Eugene	Sydney McLaughlin (USA)	Femke Bol (NED)	Dalilah Muhammad (USA)
2023 Budapest	Femke Bol (NED)	Shamier Little (USA)	Rushell Clayton (JAM)
2025 Tokyo	Femke Bol (NED)	Jasmine Jones (USA)	Emma Zapletalová (SVK)

==== Medal table ====
Rank	Nation	Gold	Silver	Bronze	Total
1	United States (USA)	5	11	6	22
2	East Germany (GDR)	2	1	3	6
3	Australia (AUS)	2	1	0	3
3	Morocco (MAR)	2	1	0	3
3	Soviet Union (URS)	2	1	0	3
3	Netherlands (NED)	2	1	0	3
7	Czech Republic (CZE)	2	0	0	2
8	Jamaica (JAM)	1	2	4	7
9	Russia (RUS)	1	2	3	6
10	Great Britain (GBR)	1	1	0	2
11	Cuba (CUB)	1	0	1	2
12	Denmark (DEN)	1	0	0	1
13	Spain (ESP)	0	1	0	1
13	Turkey (TUR)	0	1	0	1
17	Poland (POL)	0	0	1	1
17	Trinidad and Tobago (TTO)	0	0	1	1
17	Slovakia (SVK)	0	0	1	1

==== Multiple medalists ====
Multiple medalists
Rank	Athlete	Nation	Period	Gold	Silver	Bronze	Total
1	Nezha Bidouane	Morocco (MAR)	1997–2001	2	1	0	3
1	Femke Bol	Netherlands (NED)	2022–2025	2	1	0	3
3	Jana Pittman	Australia (AUS)	2003–2007	2	0	0	2
3	Zuzana Hejnová	Czech Republic (CZE)	2013–2015	2	0	0	2
5	Yuliya Pechonkina	Russia (RUS)	2001–2007	1	2	1	4
5	Lashinda Demus	United States (USA)	2005–2013	1	2	1	4
5	Dalilah Muhammad	United States (USA)	2013–2022	1	2	1	4
8	Sally Gunnell	Great Britain (GBR)	1991–1993	1	1	0	2
8	Melaine Walker	Jamaica (JAM)	2009–2011	1	1	0	2
8	Sydney McLaughlin	United States (USA)	2019–2022	1	1	0	2
11	Kim Batten	United States (USA)	1995–1997	1	0	1	2
11	Daimí Pernía	Cuba (CUB)	1999–2001	1	0	1	2
13	Shamier Little	United States (USA)	2015–2023	0	2	0	2
14	Deon Hemmings	Jamaica (JAM)	1995–1999	0	1	2	3
15	Ellen Fiedler	East Germany (GDR)	1980–1983	0	1	1	2
15	Sandra Glover	United States (USA)	2003–2005	0	1	1	2
17	Rushell Clayton	Jamaica (JAM)	2019–2023	0	0	2	2

== Championship record progression ==
=== Men ===
Men's 400 metres hurdles World Championships record progression
Time	Athlete	Nation	Year	Round	Date
50.44	Andre Philips	United States (USA)	1983	Heats	1983-08-07
50.12	Aleksandr Kharlov	Soviet Union (URS)	1983	Heats	1983-08-07
49.54	Edwin Moses	United States (USA)	1983	Heats	1983-08-07
48.11	Edwin Moses	United States (USA)	1983	Semi-finals	1983-08-08
47.50	Edwin Moses	United States (USA)	1983	Final	1983-08-09
47.46	Edwin Moses	United States (USA)	1987	Final	1987-09-01
47.18	Kevin Young	United States (USA)	1993	Final	1993-08-19
46.29	Alison dos Santos	Brazil (BRA)	2022	Final	2022-07-19

=== Women ===
Women's 400 metres hurdles World Championships record progression
Time	Athlete	Nation	Year	Round	Date
56.43	Yekaterina Fesenko	Soviet Union (URS)	1983	Heats	1983-08-08
56.30	Anna Ambraziene	Soviet Union (URS)	1983	Heats	1983-08-08
55.77	Petra Pfaff	East Germany (GDR)	1983	Semi-finals	1983-08-09
55.18	Anna Ambraziene	Soviet Union (URS)	1983	Semi-finals	1983-08-09
54.14	Yekaterina Fesenko	Soviet Union (URS)	1983	Final	1983-08-10
53.62	Sabine Busch	East Germany (GDR)	1987	Final	1987-09-03
53.11	Tatyana Ledovskaya	Soviet Union (URS)	1991	Final	1991-08-29
52.74 WR	Sally Gunnell	Great Britain (GBR)	1993	Final	1993-08-19
52.61 WR	Kim Batten	United States (USA)	1995	Final	1995-08-11
52.42	Melaine Walker	Jamaica (JAM)	2009	Final	2009-08-20
52.16 WR	Dalilah Muhammad	United States (USA)	2019	Final	2019-10-04
50.68 WR	Sydney McLaughlin	United States (USA)	2022	Final	2022-07-22

== Finishing times ==
=== Top ten fastest World Championship times ===
Fastest men's times at the World Championships
Rank	Time (sec)	Athlete	Nation	Year	Date
1	46.29	Alison dos Santos	Brazil	2022	2022-07-19
2	46.52	Rai Benjamin	United States	2025	2025-09-19
3	46.84	Alison dos Santos	Brazil	2025	2025-09-19
4	46.89	Rai Benjamin	United States	2022	2022-07-19
4	46.89	Karsten Warholm	Norway	2023	2023-08-23
6	47.06	Abderrahman Samba	Qatar	2025	2025-09-19
7	47.09	Karsten Warholm	Norway	2023^{SF}	2023-08-21
8	47.11	Ezekiel Nathaniel	Nigeria	2025	2025-09-19
9	47.18	Kevin Young	United States	1993	1993-08-19
10	47.24	Rai Benjamin	United States	2023^{SF}	2023-08-21

Fastest women's times at the World Championships
Rank	Time (sec)	Athlete	Nation	Year	Date
1	50.68	Sydney McLaughlin	United States	2022	2022-07-22
2	51.54	Femke Bol	Netherlands	2025	2025-09-19
3	51.70	Femke Bol	Netherlands	2023	2023-08-24
4	52.08	Jasmine Jones	United States	2025	2025-09-19
5	52.16	Dalilah Muhammad	United States	2019	2019-10-04
6	52.17	Sydney McLaughlin	United States	2022^{SF}	2022-07-20
7	52.23	Sydney McLaughlin	United States	2019	2019-10-04
8	52.27	Femke Bol	Netherlands	2022	2022-07-22
9	52.31	Femke Bol	Netherlands	2025^{SF}	2025-09-17
10	52.42	Melaine Walker	Jamaica	2009	2009-10-20

== See also ==
- 400 metres hurdles
- 400 metres hurdles at the Olympics
