= 1995 World Championships in Athletics – Women's 400 metres hurdles =

Video on YouTube Official video

Women's 400 metres hurdles event at the 1995 World Championships in Athletics was held in Gothenburg, on 8, 9 and 11 August.

== Medalists ==
Gold	Kim Batten; United States (USA)
Silver	Tonja Buford; United States (USA)
Bronze	Deon Hemmings; Jamaica (JAM)

== Results ==
=== Heats ===
First 3 of each heat (Q) and the next 4 fastest (q) qualified for the semifinals.

Rank	Heat	Name	Nationality	Time	Notes
1	3	Deon Hemmings	Jamaica	54.72	Q
2	1	Tonya Buford	United States	55.15	Q
3	2	Kim Batten	United States	55.71	Q
4	3	Silvia Rieger	Germany	55.75	Q
5	4	Heike Meissner	Germany	55.95	Q
6	4	Trevaia Williams	United States	55.98	Q
7	3	Tatyana Ledovskaya	Belarus	56.03	Q
8	1	Tetyana Tereshchuk	Ukraine	56.16	Q
9	1	Natalya Torshina	Kazakhstan	56.23	Q
10	4	Karen van der Veen	South Africa	56.32	Q
11	3	Omolade Akinremi	Nigeria	56.46	q
12	1	Monika Warnicka	Poland	56.88	q
13	4	Irina Lenskaya	Ukraine	57.52	q
14	1	Olga Nazarova	Russia	57.64	q
15	4	Debbie-Ann Parris	Jamaica	57.83	
16	1	Louise Fraser	Great Britain	57.99	
17	3	Miriam Alonso	Spain	58.36	
18	1	Åsa Carlsson	Sweden	58.42	
19	2	Ionela Târlea	Romania	58.47	Q
20	2	Gudrun Arnardottir	Iceland	58.57	Q
21	4	Marie Womplou	Ivory Coast	58.67	
22	2	Zhanna Sokolova	Tajikistan	1:13.16	
	2	Hsu Pei-Chin	Chinese Taipei	DQ	
	2	Tatyana Kurochkina	Belarus	DQ	
	3	Nezha Bidouane	Morocco	DQ	
	2	Rosey Edeh	Canada	DNS	

=== Semifinals ===
First 4 of each heat (Q) qualified directly for the final.

Rank	Heat	Name	Nationality	Time	Notes
1	2	Kim Batten	United States	54.15	Q
2	2	Deon Hemmings	Jamaica	54.33	Q
3	1	Tonya Buford	United States	55.30	Q
4	2	Silvia Rieger	Germany	55.69	Q
5	1	Tetyana Tereshchuk	Ukraine	56.09	Q
6	2	Ionela Târlea	Romania	56.21	Q
7	1	Natalya Torshina	Kazakhstan	56.52	Q
8	1	Heike Meissner	Germany	56.75	Q
9	1	Monika Warnicka	Poland	56.88	
10	1	Olga Nazarova	Russia	56.89	
11	2	Omolade Akinremi	Nigeria	57.07	
12	2	Gudrun Arnardottir	Iceland	57.29	
13	2	Irina Lenskaya	Ukraine	57.33	
14	1	Trevaia Williams	United States	1:04.84	
	1	Karen van der Veen	South Africa	DQ	
	2	Tatyana Ledovskaya	Belarus	DQ	

=== Final ===
Rank	Lane	Name	Nationality	Time	Notes
1st place, gold medalist(s)	5	Kim Batten	United States	52.61	WR
2nd place, silver medalist(s)	3	Tonya Buford	United States	52.62	
3rd place, bronze medalist(s)	4	Deon Hemmings	Jamaica	53.48	NR
4	7	Heike Meissner	Germany	54.86	
5	6	Tetyana Tereshchuk	Ukraine	54.94	
6	1	Silvia Rieger	Germany	55.01	
7	8	Ionela Târlea	Romania	55.46	
8	2	Natalya Torshina	Kazakhstan	56.75	
