= 1993 World Championships in Athletics – Women's 400 metres hurdles =

These are the official results of the Women's 400 metres Hurdles event at the 1993 IAAF World Championships in Stuttgart, Germany. There were a total number of 36 participating athletes, with Five qualifying heats, three semi-finals and the final held on Thursday 1993-08-19.

== Final ==
RANK	FINAL	TIME
	Sally Gunnell (GBR)	52.74 WR
	Sandra Farmer-Patrick (USA)	52.79
	Margarita Ponomaryova (RUS)	53.48
4.	Kim Batten (USA)	53.84
5.	Tonya Buford (USA)	54.55
6.	Deon Hemmings (JAM)	54.99
7.	Rosey Edeh (CAN)	55.19
8.	Natalya Torshina (KAZ)	55.78

== Semi-finals ==
- Held on Tuesday 1993-08-17

RANK	HEAT 1	TIME
1.	Sally Gunnell (GBR)	53.95
2.	Tonya Buford (USA)	54.38
3.	Heike Meissner (GER)	54.64
4.	Anna Knoroz (RUS)	55.12
5.	Tatyana Kurochkina (BLR)	55.64
6.	Debbie-Ann Parris (JAM)	55.80
7.	Sylwia Pachut (POL)	56.31
8.	Nicoleta Carutasu (ROM)	56.61

RANK	HEAT 2	TIME
1.	Margarita Ponomaryova (RUS)	53.71
2.	Kim Batten (USA)	54.20
3.	Natalya Torshina (KAZ)	54.53
4.	Rosey Edeh (CAN)	54.53
5.	Silvia Rieger (GER)	54.90
6.	Monica Westen (SWE)	55.88
7.	Ann Maenhout (BEL)	56.14
8.	Jacqui Parker (GBR)	56.68

RANK	HEAT 3	TIME
1.	Sandra Farmer-Patrick (USA)	53.88
2.	Deon Hemmings (JAM)	54.12
3.	Tatyana Ledovskaya (BLR)	54.60
4.	Olga Nazarova (RUS)	55.51
5.	Gowry Retchakan (GBR)	55.96
6.	Donalda Duprey (CAN)	56.16
7.	Frida Johansson (SWE)	56.48
8.	Lana Uys (RSA)	57.40

== Qualifying heats ==
- Held on Monday 1993-08-16

RANK	HEAT 1	TIME
1.	Sally Gunnell (GBR)	55.06
2.	Silvia Rieger (GER)	56.30
3.	Frida Johansson (SWE)	56.81
4.	Nicoleta Carutasu (ROM)	57.13
5.	Monika Warnicka (POL)	57.38
6.	Anabella Von Kesselstat (ARG)	57.82
7.	Zuzana Machotková (CZE)	59.53

RANK	HEAT 2	TIME
1.	Tatyana Ledovskaya (BLR)	55.37
2.	Heike Meissner (GER)	55.84
3.	Debbie-Ann Parris (JAM)	56.19
4.	Ann Maenhout (BEL)	56.48
5.	Lana Uys (RSA)	56.55
6.	Marta Moreira (POR)	58.06
7.	Jupira da Graça (BRA)	58.79

RANK	HEAT 3	TIME
1.	Margarita Ponomaryova (RUS)	54.68
2.	Tonya Buford (USA)	55.42
3.	Rosey Edeh (CAN)	55.70
4.	Monica Westen (SWE)	56.34
5.	Jacqui Parker (GBR)	56.93
6.	Linda Kisabaka (GER)	57.02
7.	Marjut Toyli (FIN)	1:00.16
8.	Ivette Sánchez (PAN)	1:07.89

RANK	HEAT 4	TIME
1.	Olga Nazarova (RUS)	54.68
2.	Sandra Farmer-Patrick (USA)	55.70
3.	Deon Hemmings (JAM)	55.94
4.	Gowry Retchakan (GBR)	56.31
5.	Sylwia Pachut (POL)	56.92
6.	Miriam Alonso (ESP)	58.62
7.	Alejandra Quintanar (MEX)	1:00.04

RANK	HEAT 5	TIME
1.	Kim Batten (USA)	55.37
2.	Natalya Torshina (KAZ)	55.51
3.	Anna Knoroz (RUS)	55.54
4.	Tatyana Kurochkina (BLR)	55.69
5.	Donalda Duprey (CAN)	56.80
6.	Mary-Estelle Kapalu (VAN)	1:00.29
–	Nezha Bidouane (MAR)	DNF
–	Yana Burtasenkova (MDA)	DNS

== See also ==
- 1988 Women's Olympic 400m Hurdles (Seoul)
- 1990 Women's European Championships 400m Hurdles (Split)
- 1992 Women's Olympic 400m Hurdles (Barcelona)
- 1994 Women's European Championships 400m Hurdles (Helsinki)
