= 400 metres hurdles at the Olympics =

400 metres hurdles at the Olympic Games
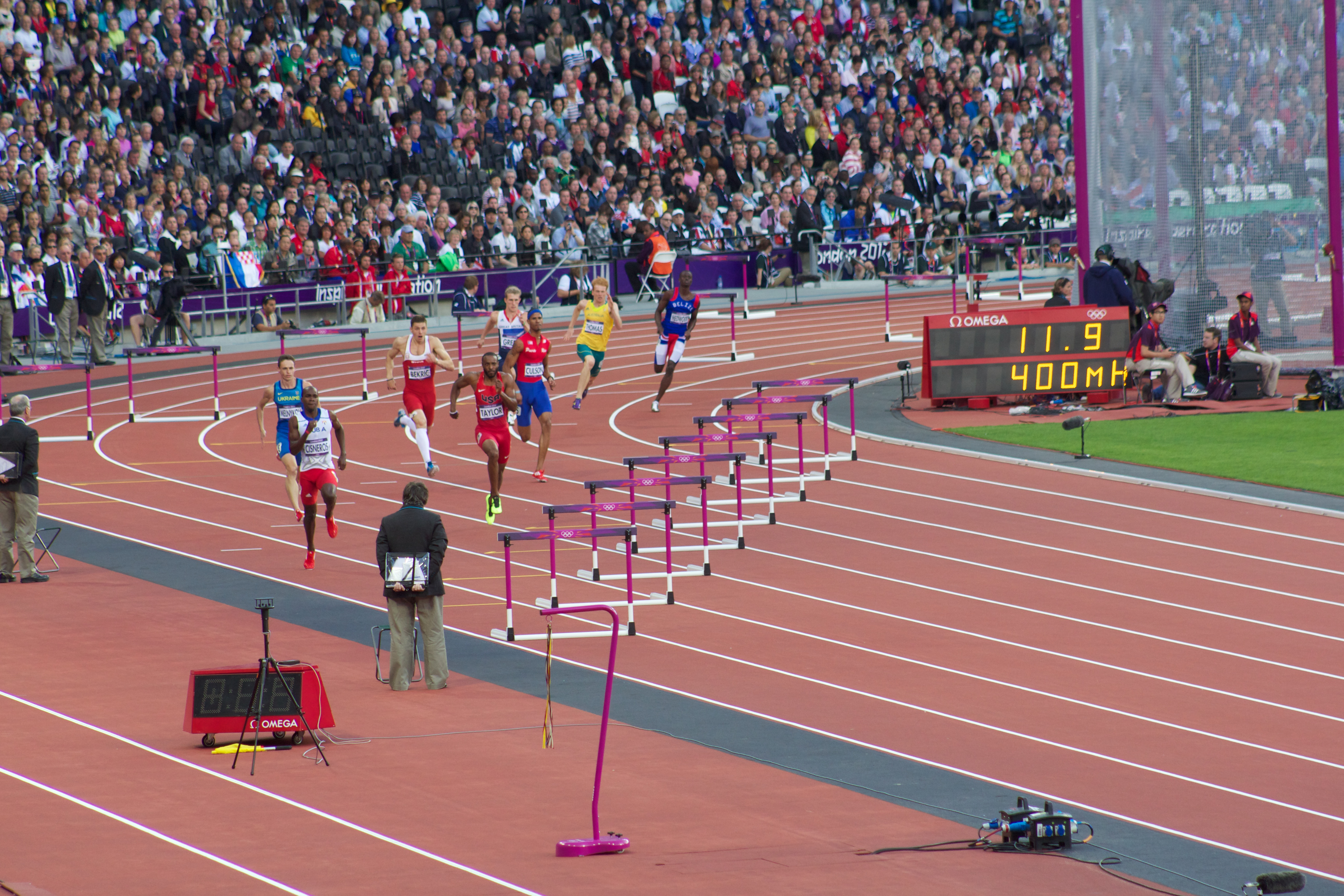
- The 2012 Olympic men's 400 m hurdles semi-final

Overview
- Sport: Athletics
- Gender: Men and women
- Years held: Men: 1900– 1908, 1920 –2024; Women: 1984–2024

Olympic record
- Men: Karsten Warholm (NOR) 45.94 (2021)
- Women: Sydney McLaughlin (USA) 50.37 (2024)

Reigning champion
- Men: Rai Benjamin (USA)
- Women: Sydney McLaughlin (USA)

The 400 metres hurdles at the Summer Olympics is the longest hurdling event held at the multi-sport event. The men's 400 m hurdles has been present on the Olympic athletics programme since 1900, with a sole gap at the 1912 Summer Olympics. The women's event was added to the programme over eighty years later, at the 1984 Olympics. It is the most prestigious 400 m hurdles race at elite level.

The Olympic records for the event are 45.94 seconds for men, set by Karsten Warholm in 2021, and 50.37 seconds for women, set by Sydney McLaughlin in 2024. The men's world record has been broken at the Olympics on eight occasions: 1908 (the first official IAAF record), 1920, 1932, 1968, 1972, 1976, 1992, and 2021. The women's world record had never been broken in Olympic competition prior to 2021.

Edwin Moses is the most successful athlete in the event, having won two gold and one bronze medal. Glenn Davis, Angelo Taylor and Felix Sanchez have also won two Olympic 400 m hurdles titles. Morgan Taylor is the only other athlete beside Moses that has won three medals in the event. Deon Hemmings was the most successful woman, with her 1996 gold and 2000 silver medals, and was the first female athlete to win multiple medals, until Sydney McLaughlin-Levrone won gold in 2021 in Tokyo and 2024 in Paris. It is relatively common for 400 m hurdles athletes to also be part of their nation's team for the 4×400 metres relay at the Olympics.

The United States is the most successful nation in the men's event. American men have swept the medals on five occasions. The American women have the highest medal total, with nine, but the nation managed to achieve its first victory only in 2016, when Dalilah Muhammad won the event. Russia and Jamaica are the only nations to win multiple women's gold medals, with two each. Great Britain is the first nation to have won a gold medal in both the men's and women's event, having three champions in total. In 2016, the United States became the second.

== Medal summary ==
=== Men ===
Games	Gold	Silver	Bronze
1900 Paris	Walter Tewksbury; United States	Henri Tauzin; France	George Orton; Canada
1904 St. Louis	Harry Hillman; United States	Frank Waller; United States	George Poage; United States
1908 London	Charles Bacon; United States	Harry Hillman; United States	Jimmy Tremeer; Great Britain
1912 Stockholm	not included in the Olympic program		
1920 Antwerp	Frank Loomis; United States	John Norton; United States	August Desch; United States
1924 Paris	Morgan Taylor; United States	Erik Wilén; Finland	Ivan Riley; United States
1928 Amsterdam	David Burghley; Great Britain	Frank Cuhel; United States	Morgan Taylor; United States
1932 Los Angeles	Bob Tisdall; Ireland	Glenn Hardin; United States	Morgan Taylor; United States
1936 Berlin	Glenn Hardin; United States	John Loaring; Canada	Miguel White; Philippines
1948 London	Roy Cochran; United States	Duncan White; Ceylon	Rune Larsson; Sweden
1952 Helsinki	Charles Moore; United States	Yuriy Lituyev; Soviet Union	John Holland; New Zealand
1956 Melbourne	Glenn Davis; United States	Eddie Southern; United States	Josh Culbreath; United States
1960 Rome	Glenn Davis; United States	Clifton Cushman; United States	Dick Howard; United States
1964 Tokyo	Rex Cawley; United States	John Cooper; Great Britain	Salvatore Morale; Italy
1968 Mexico City	David Hemery; Great Britain	Gerhard Hennige; West Germany	John Sherwood; Great Britain
1972 Munich	John Akii-Bua; Uganda	Ralph Mann; United States	David Hemery; Great Britain
1976 Montreal	Edwin Moses; United States	Michael Shine; United States	Yevgeniy Gavrilenko; Soviet Union
1980 Moscow	Volker Beck; East Germany	Vasyl Arkhypenko; Soviet Union	Gary Oakes; Great Britain
1984 Los Angeles	Edwin Moses; United States	Danny Harris; United States	Harald Schmid; West Germany
1988 Seoul	André Phillips; United States	Amadou Dia Ba; Senegal	Edwin Moses; United States
1992 Barcelona	Kevin Young; United States	Winthrop Graham; Jamaica	Kriss Akabusi; Great Britain
1996 Atlanta	Derrick Adkins; United States	Samuel Matete; Zambia	Calvin Davis; United States
2000 Sydney	Angelo Taylor; United States	Hadi Al-Somaily; Saudi Arabia	Llewellyn Herbert; South Africa
2004 Athens	Félix Sánchez; Dominican Republic	Danny McFarlane; Jamaica	Naman Keïta; France
2008 Beijing	Angelo Taylor; United States	Kerron Clement; United States	Bershawn Jackson; United States
2012 London	Félix Sánchez; Dominican Republic	Michael Tinsley; United States	Javier Culson; Puerto Rico
2016 Rio de Janeiro	Kerron Clement; United States	Boniface Mucheru Tumuti; Kenya	Yasmani Copello; Turkey
2020 Tokyo	Karsten Warholm; Norway	Rai Benjamin; United States	Alison dos Santos; Brazil
2024 Paris	Rai Benjamin; United States	Karsten Warholm; Norway	Alison dos Santos; Brazil

==== Multiple medalists ====
Rank	Athlete	Nation	Olympics	Gold	Silver	Bronze	Total
1	Edwin Moses	United States	1976–1988	2	0	1	3
2	Glenn Davis	United States	1956–1960	2	0	0	2
2	Angelo Taylor	United States	2000–2008	2	0	0	2
2	Félix Sánchez	Dominican Republic	2004–2012	2	0	0	2
5	Harry Hillman	United States	1904–1908	1	1	0	2
5	Glenn Hardin	United States	1932–1936	1	1	0	2
5	Kerron Clement	United States	2008, 2016	1	1	0	2
5	Karsten Warholm	Norway	2020, 2024	1	1	0	2
5	Rai Benjamin	United States	2020, 2024	1	1	0	2
9	Morgan Taylor	United States	1924–1932	1	0	2	3
10	David Hemery	Great Britain	1968–1972	1	0	1	2

==== Medals by country ====
Rank	Nation	Gold	Silver	Bronze	Total
1	United States	19	13	10	42
2	Great Britain	2	1	5	8
3	Dominican Republic	2	0	0	2
4	East Germany	1	0	0	1
4	Ireland	1	0	0	1
4	Norway	1	0	0	1
4	Uganda	1	0	0	1
8	Soviet Union	0	2	1	3
9	Jamaica	0	2	0	2
10	Canada	0	1	1	2
10	France	0	1	1	2
10	West Germany	0	1	1	2
13	Ceylon	0	1	0	1
13	Finland	0	1	0	1
13	Kenya	0	1	0	1
13	Saudi Arabia	0	1	0	1
13	Senegal	0	1	0	1
13	Zambia	0	1	0	1
19	Brazil	0	0	1	1
19	Italy	0	0	1	1
19	New Zealand	0	0	1	1
19	Philippines	0	0	1	1
19	Puerto Rico	0	0	1	1
19	South Africa	0	0	1	1
19	Sweden	0	0	1	1
19	Turkey	0	0	1	1

=== Women ===
Games	Gold	Silver	Bronze
1984 Los Angeles	Nawal El Moutawakel; Morocco	Judi Brown; United States	Cristieana Cojocaru; Romania
1988 Seoul	Debbie Flintoff-King; Australia	Tatyana Ledovskaya; Soviet Union	Ellen Fiedler; East Germany
1992 Barcelona	Sally Gunnell; Great Britain	Sandra Farmer-Patrick; United States	Janeene Vickers; United States
1996 Atlanta	Deon Hemmings; Jamaica	Kim Batten; United States	Tonja Buford-Bailey; United States
2000 Sydney	Irina Privalova; Russia	Deon Hemmings; Jamaica	Nezha Bidouane; Morocco
2004 Athens	Fani Halkia; Greece	Ionela Târlea-Manolache; Romania	Tetyana Tereshchuk-Antipova; Ukraine
2008 Beijing	Melaine Walker; Jamaica	Sheena Tosta; United States	Tasha Danvers; Great Britain
2012 London	Lashinda Demus; United States	Zuzana Hejnová; Czech Republic	Kaliese Spencer; Jamaica
2016 Rio de Janeiro	Dalilah Muhammad; United States	Sara Petersen; Denmark	Ashley Spencer; United States
2020 Tokyo	Sydney McLaughlin; United States	Dalilah Muhammad; United States	Femke Bol; Netherlands
2024 Paris	Sydney McLaughlin-Levrone; United States	Anna Cockrell; United States	Femke Bol; Netherlands

==== Multiple medalists ====
Rank	Athlete	Nation	Olympics	Gold	Silver	Bronze	Total
1	Sydney McLaughlin-Levrone	United States	2020–2024	2	0	0	2
2	Deon Hemmings	Jamaica	1996–2000	1	1	0	2
3	Dalilah Muhammad	United States	2016–2020	1	1	0	2
4	Femke Bol	Netherlands	2020–2024	0	0	2	2

==== Medalists by country ====
Rank	Nation	Gold	Silver	Bronze	Total
1	United States	4	6	3	13
2	Jamaica	2	1	1	4
3=	Great Britain	1	0	1	2
3=	Morocco	1	0	1	2
5=	Australia	1	0	0	1
5=	Greece	1	0	0	1
5=	Russia	1	0	0	1
8	Romania	0	1	1	2
9=	Czech Republic	0	1	0	1
9=	Denmark	0	1	0	1
9=	Soviet Union	0	1	0	1
12=	East Germany	0	0	1	1
12=	Ukraine	0	0	1	1
12=	Netherlands	0	0	1	1

== Finishing times ==
The 2024 women's final was the fastest women's 400-meter hurdles race in Olympic history collectively: five of the eight women ran under 52.7 seconds, with these times ranking among the top 11 in Olympic history.

=== Top ten fastest Olympic times ===
Fastest men's times at the Olympics
Rank	Time (sec)	Athlete	Nation	Games	Date
1	45.94 (WR)	Karsten Warholm	Norway	2020	2021-08-03
2	46.17	Rai Benjamin	United States	2020	2021-08-03
3	46.46	Rai Benjamin	United States	2024	2024-08-09
4	46.72	Alison dos Santos	Brazil	2020	2021-08-03
5	46.78	Kevin Young	United States	1992	1992-08-06
6	47.06	Karsten Warholm	Norway	2024	2024-08-09
7	47.08	Kyron McMaster	British Virgin Islands	2020	2021-08-03
8	47.12	Abderrahman Samba	Qatar	2020	2021-08-03
9	47.19	Andre Phillips	United States	1988	1988-09-25
10	47.20	Alison dos Santos	Brazil	2024	2024-08-09

Fastest women's times at the Olympics
Rank	Time (sec)	Athlete	Nation	Games	Date
1	50.37 (WR)	Sydney McLaughlin-Levrone	United States	2024	2024-08-08
2	51.46	Sydney McLaughlin	United States	2020	2021-08-04
3	51.58	Dalilah Muhammad	United States	2020	2021-08-04
4	51.87	Anna Cockrell	United States	2024	2024-08-08
5	52.03	Femke Bol	Netherlands	2020	2021-08-04
6	52.13	Sydney McLaughlin-Levrone	United States	2024^{SF}	2024-08-06
7	52.15	Femke Bol	Netherlands	2024	2024-08-08
8	52.29	Jasmine Jones	United States	2024	2024-08-08
9	52.57	Femke Bol	Netherlands	2024^{SF}	2024-08-06
10	52.64	Melaine Walker	Jamaica	2008	2008-08-20

- SF - Semi-Finals
