= 1994 European Athletics Championships – Women's 400 metres hurdles =

Women's 400 metres hurdles at the European Athletics Championships
- Venue: Helsinki Olympic Stadium
- Location: Helsinki, Finland
- Dates: 9 and 10 August 1994
- Competitors: 24 from 15 nations
- Winning time: 53.33 s

Medalists
gold medal	Sally Gunnell	United Kingdom
silver medal	Silvia Rieger	Germany
bronze medal	Anna Knoroz	Russia

The women's 400 metres hurdles event at the 1994 European Athletics Championships was held in Helsinki, Finland, at Helsinki Olympic Stadium on 9 and 10 August 1994.

== Medalists ==
Gold	Sally Gunnell; United Kingdom
Silver	Silvia Rieger; Germany
Bronze	Anna Knoroz; Russia

== Results ==
=== Final ===
10 August

Rank	Name	Nationality	Time	Notes
1st place, gold medalist(s)	Sally Gunnell	United Kingdom	53.33	
2nd place, silver medalist(s)	Silvia Rieger	Germany	54.68	
3rd place, bronze medalist(s)	Anna Knoroz	Russia	54.68	
4	Heike Meißner	Germany	54.79	
5	Tatyana Kurochkina	Belarus	55.18	
6	Tetyana Tereshchuk	Ukraine	55.53	
7	Olga M. Nazarova	Russia	55.98	
8	Gowry Retchakan	United Kingdom	56.05	

=== Semi-finals ===
10 August

==== Semi-final 1 ====
Rank	Name	Nationality	Time	Notes
1	Heike Meißner	Germany	55.16	Q
2	Tatyana Kurochkina	Belarus	55.49	Q
3	Gowry Retchakan	United Kingdom	55.78	Q
4	Olga M. Nazarova	Russia	55.90	Q
5	Gesine Schmidt	Germany	56.01	
6	Monica Westén	Sweden	56.38	
7	Sylwia Pachut	Poland	56.57	
8	Michèle Schenk	Switzerland	57.67	

==== Semi-final 2 ====
Rank	Name	Nationality	Time	Notes
1	Sally Gunnell	United Kingdom	54.60	Q
2	Anna Knoroz	Russia	54.82	Q
3	Silvia Rieger	Germany	55.69	Q
4	Tetyana Tereshchuk	Ukraine	55.79	Q
5	Anita Protti	Switzerland	56.15	
6	Vera Ordina	Russia	56.40	
7	Monika Warnicka	Poland	56.70	
8	Frida Johansson	Sweden	57.54	

=== Heats ===
9 August

==== Heat 1 ====
Rank	Name	Nationality	Time	Notes
1	Olga M. Nazarova	Russia	55.71	Q
2	Heike Meißner	Germany	56.13	Q
3	Monika Warnicka	Poland	56.48	Q
4	Anita Protti	Switzerland	56.51	Q
5	Monica Westén	Sweden	56.74	q
6	Iina Pekkola	Finland	57.81	
7	Jacqui Parker	United Kingdom	57.83	
8	Stefanie Zotter	Austria	58.32	

==== Heat 2 ====
Rank	Name	Nationality	Time	Notes
1	Sally Gunnell	United Kingdom	55.17	Q
2	Tetyana Tereshchuk	Ukraine	55.75	Q
3	Gesine Schmidt	Germany	55.96	Q
4	Michèle Schenk	Switzerland	56.50	Q
5	Vera Ordina	Russia	56.66	q
6	Sylwia Pachut	Poland	56.76	q
7	Tiia Eeskivi	Estonia	58.06	
8	Carole Nelson	France	58.39	

==== Heat 3 ====
Rank	Name	Nationality	Time	Notes
1	Tatyana Kurochkina	Belarus	55.53	Q
2	Silvia Rieger	Germany	55.83	Q
3	Anna Knoroz	Russia	55.95	Q
4	Gowry Retchakan	United Kingdom	56.45	Q
5	Frida Johansson	Sweden	57.06	q
6	Ionela Tîrlea	Romania	57.79	
7	Lana Jekabsone	Latvia	57.99	
8	Virna De Angeli	Italy	58.60	

== Participation ==
According to an unofficial count, 24 athletes from 15 countries participated in the event.

- Austria (1)
- Belarus (1)
- Estonia (1)
- Finland (1)
- France (1)
- Germany (3)
- Italy (1)
- Latvia (1)
- Poland (2)
- Romania (1)
- Russia (3)
- Sweden (2)
- Switzerland (2)
- Ukraine (1)
- United Kingdom (3)
