= Athletics at the 1994 Goodwill Games – Results =

These are the official results of the athletics competition at the 1994 Goodwill Games which took place in late July 1994 in Saint Petersburg, Russia.

== Men's results ==
=== 100 meters ===
Rank	Name	Nationality	Time	Notes
1st place, gold medalist(s)	Dennis Mitchell	United States	10.07	GR
2nd place, silver medalist(s)	Leroy Burrell	United States	10.11	
3rd place, bronze medalist(s)	Jon Drummond	United States	10.12	
4	Carl Lewis	United States	10.23	
5	Aleksandr Porkhomovskiy	Russia	10.23	
6	Andre Cason	United States	10.33	
7	Vitaliy Savin	Kazakhstan	10.36	
8	Joel Isasi	Cuba	10.55	

=== 200 meters ===
Rank	Name	Nationality	Time	Notes
1st place, gold medalist(s)	Michael Johnson	United States	20.10	GR
2nd place, silver medalist(s)	Frank Fredericks	Namibia	20.17	
3rd place, bronze medalist(s)	John Regis	Great Britain	20.31	
4	Mike Marsh	United States	20.48	
5	Damien Marsh	Australia	20.56	
6	Serhiy Osovych	Ukraine	20.58	
7	Andrey Fedoriv	Russia	20.71	
8	Ron Clark	United States	20.87	

=== 400 meters ===
Rank	Name	Nationality	Time	Notes
1st place, gold medalist(s)	Quincy Watts	United States	45.21	
2nd place, silver medalist(s)	Du'aine Ladejo	Great Britain	45.21	
3rd place, bronze medalist(s)	Derek Mills	United States	45.29	
4	Jason Rouser	United States	45.37	
5	Dmitriy Golovastov	Russia	45.62	
6	Steve Lewis	United States	45.90	
7	Norberto Téllez	Cuba	46.01	
8	Dmitriy Kosov	Russia	46.58	

=== 800 meters ===
Rank	Name	Nationality	Time	Notes
1st place, gold medalist(s)	Andrey Loginov	Russia	1:46.65	
2nd place, silver medalist(s)	Stanley Redwine	United States	1:46.84	
3rd place, bronze medalist(s)	Paul Ruto	Kenya	1:47.01	
4	Hezekiél Sepeng	South Africa	1:47.11	
5	William Tanui	Kenya	1:47.15	
6	José Luíz Barbosa	Brazil	1:47.49	
7	Joaquim Cruz	Brazil	1:47.56	
8	Réda Abdenouz	Algeria	1:49.11	
9	Anatoly Makarevich	Belarus	1:49.79	
10	Johnny Gray	United States	1:51.21	

=== Mile ===
Rank	Name	Nationality	Time	Notes
1st place, gold medalist(s)	Noureddine Morceli	Algeria	3:48.67	GR
2nd place, silver medalist(s)	Abdi Bile	Somalia	3:52.28	
3rd place, bronze medalist(s)	Steve Holman	United States	3:52.77	
4	Vyacheslav Shabunin	Russia	3:53.54	
5	Marcus O'Sullivan	Ireland	3:53.86	
6	David Kibet	Kenya	3:54.82	
7	Terrance Harrington	United States	3:55.38	
8	William Tanui	Kenya	3:56.34	
9	Christian Cushing-Murray	United States	3:57.05	
10	Azat Rakipov	Belarus	3:57.88	
	Réda Abdenouz	Algeria	DNF	
	Nacer Brahmia	Algeria	DNF	

=== 5000 meters ===
Rank	Name	Nationality	Time	Notes
1st place, gold medalist(s)	Moses Kiptanui	Kenya	13:10.76	GR
2nd place, silver medalist(s)	Paul Bitok	Kenya	13:24.41	
3rd place, bronze medalist(s)	Jon Brown	Great Britain	13:24.79	
4	Aïssa Belaout	Algeria	13:25.90	
5	Simon Chemoiywo	Kenya	13:30.39	
6	Andrey Tikhonov	Russia	13:39.45	
7	Aleksei Mikitenko	Kazakhstan	13:39.95	
8	Yuriy Chizhov	Russia	13:44.91	
9	Matt Guisto	United States	13:45.70	
10	Sergey Fedotov	Russia	13:51.80	
11	Aleksey Skutaru	Moldova	15:09.92	
	Frank O'Mara	Ireland	DNF	
	Rueben Reina	United States	DNF	
	Kibiego Kororia	Kenya	DNF	

=== 10,000 meters ===
Rank	Name	Nationality	Time	Notes
1st place, gold medalist(s)	Hammou Boutayeb	Morocco	28:10.89	
2nd place, silver medalist(s)	Oleg Strizhakov	Russia	28:27.69	
3rd place, bronze medalist(s)	Kibiego Kororia	Kenya	28:28.56	
4	Tom Ansberry	United States	28:40.74	
5	Yosuke Osawa	Japan	28:41.11	
6	Eamonn Martin	Great Britain	28:46.50	
7	Ed Eyestone	United States	28:48.91	
8	Andrey Zhulin	Kazakhstan	29:38.85	
9	Vladimir Gusov	Kazakhstan	30:48.72	

=== 110 meters hurdles ===
Rank	Name	Nationality	Time	Notes
1st place, gold medalist(s)	Colin Jackson	Great Britain	13.29	
2nd place, silver medalist(s)	Tony Jarrett	Great Britain	13.33	
3rd place, bronze medalist(s)	Emilio Valle	Cuba	13.35	
4	Greg Foster	United States	13.44	
5	Mark Crear	United States	13.50	
6	Igors Kazanovs	Latvia	14.02	
7	Dmitry Buldov	Russia	14.06	
8	Vladimir Belakon	Ukraine	15.63	

=== 400 meters hurdles ===
Rank	Name	Nationality	Time	Notes
1st place, gold medalist(s)	Derrick Adkins	United States	47.86	GR
2nd place, silver medalist(s)	Samuel Matete	Zambia	47.98	
3rd place, bronze medalist(s)	Winthrop Graham	Jamaica	49.13	
4	Ruslan Mashchenko	Russia	49.71	
5	Vadim Zadoinov	Moldova	49.83	
6	José Pérez	Cuba	49.84	
7	Sergey Podrez	Russia	50.08	
8	German Petrov	Russia	50.72	

=== 3000 meters steeplechase ===
Rank	Name	Nationality	Time	Notes
1st place, gold medalist(s)	Marc Davis	United States	8:14.30	GR
2nd place, silver medalist(s)	Mark Croghan	United States	8:21.85	
3rd place, bronze medalist(s)	Joseph Keter	Kenya	8:23.13	
4	Graeme Fell	Canada	8:26.25	
5	Vladimir Pronin	Russia	8:29.40	
6	Justin Chaston	Great Britain	8:29.49	
7	Vasily Omelyusik	Belarus	8:36.68	
8	Marcelo Cascabelo	Argentina	8:42.59	
9	Aleksei Patserin	Ukraine	8:46.32	
10	Vladimir Golyas	Russia	8:46.77	
11	Ricardo Vera	Uruguay	8:58.96	

=== 4 x 100 meters relay ===
Rank	Nation	Competitors	Time	Notes
1st place, gold medalist(s)	United States	Mike Marsh, Leroy Burrell, Sam Jefferson, Carl Lewis	38.30	
2nd place, silver medalist(s)	Cuba	Andrés Simón, Joel Lamela, Iván García, Leonardo Prevost	38.76	
3rd place, bronze medalist(s)	Russia	Andrey Fedoriv, Aleksandr Porkhomovskiy, Oleg Fatun, Andrey Grigoryev	38.92	
4	Ukraine	Aleksey Chikhachov, Oleh Kramarenko, Dmitriy Vanyaikin, Serhiy Osovych	39.29	

=== 4 x 400 meters relay ===
Rank	Nation	Competitors	Time	Notes
1st place, gold medalist(s)	United States	Derek Mills, Andrew Valmon, Jason Rouser, Michael Johnson	2:59.42	GR
2nd place, silver medalist(s)	Cuba	Omar Mena, Iván García, Jorge Crusellas, Norberto Téllez	3:01.87	
3rd place, bronze medalist(s)	Russia A	Dmitriy Golovastov, Mikhail Vdovin, Dmitriy Bey, Dmitriy Kosov	3:02.70	
4	Russia B	Innokenty Zharov, Roman Roslavtsev, Stanislav Gabidulin, Dmitriy Kliger	3:06.75	
5	Ukraine	Leonid Yazhinsky, Pyotr Zhelezniy, Vladimir Dorosh, Roman Galkin	3:08.92	

=== 20,000 meters walk ===
Rank	Name	Nationality	Time	Notes
1st place, gold medalist(s)	Bernardo Segura	Mexico	1:23:28.88	
2nd place, silver medalist(s)	Ruslan Shafikov	Russia	1:23:28.90	
3rd place, bronze medalist(s)	Jiao Baozhong	China	1:24:07.60	
4	Vyacheslav Cherepanov	Russia	1:26:02.66	
5	Aleksey Voyevodin	Russia	1:26:44.49	
6	Valeriy Borisov	Kazakhstan	1:27:39.12	
7	Allen James	United States	1:27:47.56	
8	Sigitas Vainauskas	Lithuania	1:27:53.60	
9	Sergey Tyulenev	Russia	1:28:08.07	
10	Dmitriy Dolnikov	Russia	1:28:29.84	
11	Fedosey Chumachenko	Ukraine	1:31:25.38	
12	Philip Dunn	United States	1:38:09.14	
	Vladimir Andreyev	Russia	DNF	
	Andrew Hermann	United States	DNF	
	Dmitriy Yesipchuk	Russia	DNF	
	Andrey Makarov	Russia	DNF	
	Aleksandr Shapovalov	Ukraine	DQ	
	Vladimir Druchik	Ukraine	DQ	
	Grigoriy Kornev	Russia	DQ	

=== High jump ===
Rank	Name	Nationality	Result	Notes
1st place, gold medalist(s)	Javier Sotomayor	Cuba	2.40	GR
2nd place, silver medalist(s)	Hollis Conway	United States	2.28	
3rd place, bronze medalist(s)	Leonid Pumalainen	Russia	2.28	
4	Konstantin Galkin	Russia	2.25	
5	Oleg Zhukovskiy	Belarus	2.20	
6	Ruslan Stepanov	Ukraine	2.15	

=== Pole vault ===
Rank	Name	Nationality	Result	Notes
1st place, gold medalist(s)	Igor Trandenkov	Russia	5.90	
2nd place, silver medalist(s)	Maksim Tarasov	Russia	5.80	
3rd place, bronze medalist(s)	Sergey Bubka	Ukraine	5.70	
4	Valeri Bukrejev	Estonia	5.70	
5	Pyotr Bochkaryov	Russia	5.60	
5	Scott Huffman	United States	5.60	
5	Vasiliy Bubka	Ukraine	5.60	
5	Javier García	Spain	5.60	
	Dean Starkey	United States	NM	

=== Long jump ===
Rank	Name	Nationality	Result	Notes
1st place, gold medalist(s)	Mike Powell	United States	8.45	
2nd place, silver medalist(s)	Erick Walder	United States	8.39	
3rd place, bronze medalist(s)	Kareem Streete-Thompson	United States	8.29	
4	Stanislav Tarasenko	Russia	8.09	
5	Vitaliy Kyrylenko	Ukraine	8.01	
6	Nai Hui-Fang	Chinese Taipei	7.46	
7	Vladimir Malyavin	Turkmenistan	7.44	

=== Triple jump ===
Rank	Name	Nationality	Result	Notes
1st place, gold medalist(s)	Kenny Harrison	United States	17.43	
2nd place, silver medalist(s)	Mike Conley	United States	17.25	
3rd place, bronze medalist(s)	Oleg Sakirkin	Kazakhstan	17.05	
4	Gennadiy Markov	Russia	17.04	
5	Yuriy Sotnikov	Russia	16.79	
6	Vasiliy Sokov	Russia	16.64	
7	Jonathan Edwards	Great Britain	16.57	

=== Shot put ===
Rank	Name	Nationality	Result	Notes
1st place, gold medalist(s)	C.J. Hunter	United States	20.35	
2nd place, silver medalist(s)	Randy Barnes	United States	20.22	
3rd place, bronze medalist(s)	Sergey Nikolayev	Russia	20.11	
4	Saulius Kleiza	Lithuania	19.44	
5	Yevgeniy Palchikov	Russia	18.84	
6	Sergey Smirnov	Russia	18.71	

=== Discus throw ===
Rank	Name	Nationality	Result	Notes
1st place, gold medalist(s)	Dmitriy Shevchenko	Russia	64.68	
2nd place, silver medalist(s)	Sergey Lyakhov	Russia	62.22	
3rd place, bronze medalist(s)	Attila Horváth	Hungary	61.70	
4	Roberto Moya	Cuba	60.78	
5	Costel Grasu	Romania	60.72	
6	Mike Gravelle	United States	58.90	
7	Vasiliy Kaptyukh	Belarus	58.16	
8	Dmitriy Kovtsun	Ukraine	57.02	

=== Hammer throw ===
Rank	Name	Nationality	Result	Notes
1st place, gold medalist(s)	Lance Deal	United States	80.20	
2nd place, silver medalist(s)	Vasiliy Sidorenko	Russia	80.12	
3rd place, bronze medalist(s)	Yuriy Sedykh	Russia	77.24	
4	Andrey Abduvaliyev	Tajikistan	77.24	
5	Igor Nikulin	Russia	76.58	
6	Sergey Alay	Belarus	76.26	
7	Sean Carlin	Australia	75.84	
8	Sergey Gavrilov	Russia	74.52	

=== Javelin throw ===
Rank	Name	Nationality	Result	Notes
1st place, gold medalist(s)	Andrey Shevchuk	Russia	82.90	
2nd place, silver medalist(s)	Mārcis Štrobinders	Latvia	80.92	
3rd place, bronze medalist(s)	Yuriy Rybin	Russia	80.38	
4	Vladimir Parfyonov	Uzbekistan	79.78	
5	Todd Riech	United States	76.22	
6	Viktor Zaytsev	Uzbekistan	74.22	

=== Decathlon ===
The highest mark recorded in each event is highlighted in yellow

Rank	Athlete	Nationality	100m	LJ	SP	HJ	400m	110m H	DT	PV	JT	1500m	Points	Notes
1st place, gold medalist(s)	Dan O'Brien	United States	10.49	7.81	15.70	2.20	47.74	13.81	48.10	4.90	62.20	5:10.94	8715	GR
2nd place, silver medalist(s)	Steve Fritz	United States	10.83	7.37	14.54	2.05	52.58	14.04	47.38	4.90	67.32	5:01.72	8177	
3rd place, bronze medalist(s)	Kip Janvrin	United States	11.13	6.92	14.75	1.87	49.20	15.00	44.16	4.90	58.64	4:26.08	7908	
4	Valeriy Belousov	Russia	11.34	6.91	14.08	2.05	51.42	14.92	40.60	4.90	60.24	4:29.34	7817	
5	Valter Külvet	Estonia	11.52	6.79	15.01	1.93	50.46	15.79	50.32	4.40	58.96	4:38.64	7612	
6	Oleg Veretelnikov	Uzbekistan	11.19	6.89	13.07	1.87	49.74	15.33	38.86	4.40	61.20	4:46.82	7369	
7	Nikolay Sherin	Russia	11.77	6.97	12.61	2.02	53.53	15.78	43.42	4.70	58.64	4:56.27	7237	

== Women's results ==
=== 100 meters ===
Rank	Name	Nationality	Time	Notes
1st place, gold medalist(s)	Gwen Torrence	United States	10.95	
2nd place, silver medalist(s)	Irina Privalova	Russia	10.98	
3rd place, bronze medalist(s)	Juliet Cuthbert	Jamaica	11.12	
4	Carlette Guidry-White	United States	11.15	
5	Liliana Allen	Cuba	11.29	
6	Natalya Voronova	Russia	11.39	
7	Cheryl Taplin	United States	11.48	
8	Marina Trandenkova	Russia	11.56	

=== 200 meters ===
Rank	Name	Nationality	Time	Notes
1st place, gold medalist(s)	Gwen Torrence	United States	22.09	GR
2nd place, silver medalist(s)	Irina Privalova	Russia	22.33	
3rd place, bronze medalist(s)	Carlette Guidry-White	United States	22.42	
4	Dannette Young	United States	22.73	
5	Natalya Voronova	Russia	22.82	
6	Juliet Cuthbert	Jamaica	22.85	
7	Galina Malchugina	Russia	22.91	
8	Anna Kosheleva	Russia	23.33	

=== 400 meters ===
Rank	Name	Nationality	Time	Notes
1st place, gold medalist(s)	Jearl Miles	United States	50.60	
2nd place, silver medalist(s)	Maicel Malone	United States	50.60	
3rd place, bronze medalist(s)	Natasha Kaiser-Brown	United States	50.73	
4	Sandie Richards	Jamaica	51.25	
5	Yelena Andreyeva	Russia	51.30	
6	Svetlana Goncharenko	Russia	51.60	
7	Julia Duporty	Cuba	51.97	
8	Tatyana Zakharova	Russia	52.15	

=== 800 meters ===
Rank	Name	Nationality	Time	Notes
1st place, gold medalist(s)	Maria Mutola	Mozambique	1:57.63	
2nd place, silver medalist(s)	Lyudmila Rogachova	Russia	1:58.43	
3rd place, bronze medalist(s)	Irina Samarokova	Russia	1:59.07	
4	Diane Modahl	Great Britain	1:59.85	
5	Meredith Rainey	United States	1:59.90	
6	Joetta Clark	United States	2:00.30	
7	Sonia O'Sullivan	Ireland	2:00.69	
8	Yelena Storchevaya	Ukraine	2:02.79	
	Ella Kovacs	Romania	DNF	

=== 1500 meters ===
Rank	Name	Nationality	Time	Notes
1st place, gold medalist(s)	Yekaterina Podkopayeva	Russia	4:04.92	GR
2nd place, silver medalist(s)	Sonia O'Sullivan	Ireland	4:04.97	
3rd place, bronze medalist(s)	Lyudmila Rogachova	Russia	4:05.00	
4	Lyubov Kremlyova	Russia	4:05.06	
5	Kelly Holmes	Great Britain	4:07.57	
6	Suzy Favor Hamilton	United States	4:10.35	
7	Tang Hongwei	China	4:20.29	
8	Hao Tianhua	China	4:32.25	

=== 3000 meters ===
Rank	Name	Nationality	Time	Notes
1st place, gold medalist(s)	Yelena Romanova	Russia	8:41.06	
2nd place, silver medalist(s)	Fernanda Ribeiro	Portugal	8:42.13	
3rd place, bronze medalist(s)	Annette Peters	United States	8:43.65	
4	Lyudmila Borisova	Russia	8:48.77	
5	Olga Churbanova	Russia	8:58.80	
6	Katy McCandless	United States	8:59.64	
7	Hao Tianhua	China	9:37.85	

=== 5000 meters ===
Rank	Name	Nationality	Time	Notes
1st place, gold medalist(s)	Yelena Romanova	Russia	15:28.69	
2nd place, silver medalist(s)	Tatyana Pentukova	Russia	15:30.15	
3rd place, bronze medalist(s)	Gitte Karlshøj	Denmark	15:33.88	
4	Katy McCandless	United States	15:35.81	
5	Alla Shumakova	Russia	15:37.43	
6	Tian Mei	China	15:40.86	
7	Ceci St. Geme	United States	15:50.28	
	Silvia Botticelli	Italy	DNF	

=== 10,000 meters ===
Rank	Name	Nationality	Time	Notes
1st place, gold medalist(s)	Tegla Loroupe	Kenya	31:52.39	GR
2nd place, silver medalist(s)	Klara Kashapova	Russia	32:05.42	
3rd place, bronze medalist(s)	Gwynneth Coogan	United States	32:08.77	
4	Mariko Hara	Japan	32:23.74	
5	Yelena Murgoshi	Romania	32:51.33	
6	Tian Mei	China	33:10.28	
7	Carole Zajac	United States	33:13.78	
	Olga Bondarenko	Russia	DNF	

=== 100 meters hurdles ===
Wind: +3.8 m/s

Rank	Name	Nationality	Time	Notes
1st place, gold medalist(s)	Brigita Bukovec	Slovenia	12.83	
2nd place, silver medalist(s)	Aliuska López	Cuba	12.88	
3rd place, bronze medalist(s)	Marina Azyabina	Russia	12.99	
4	Olga Shishigina	Kazakhstan	13.00	
5	Michelle Freeman	Jamaica	13.03	
6	Natalya Yudakova	Russia	13.10	
7	Jackie Agyepong	Great Britain	13.13	
8	Natalya Kolovanova	Ukraine	13.22	

=== 400 meters hurdles ===
Rank	Name	Nationality	Time	Notes
1st place, gold medalist(s)	Sally Gunnell	Great Britain	53.51	
2nd place, silver medalist(s)	Kim Batten	United States	54.22	
3rd place, bronze medalist(s)	Anna Knoroz	Russia	54.67	
4	Olga Nazarova	Russia	55.24	
5	Tonja Buford	United States	55.26	
6	Vera Ordina	Russia	56.44	
7	Natalya Ignatyuk	Belarus	56.94	
8	Natalya Torshina	Kazakhstan	58.25	

=== 2000 meters steeplechase ===
Rank	Name	Nationality	Time	Notes
1st place, gold medalist(s)	Marina Pluzhnikova	Russia	6:11.84	WB, GR
2nd place, silver medalist(s)	Svetlana Pospelova	Russia	6:25.19	
3rd place, bronze medalist(s)	Lyudmila Kuropatkina	Russia	6:26.76	
4	Natalya Cherepanova	Russia	6:41.59	
5	Gina Wilbanks	United States	7:16.71	

=== 4 x 100 meters relay ===
Rank	Nation	Competitors	Time	Notes
1st place, gold medalist(s)	United States	Cheryl Taplin, Dannette Young, Michelle Collins, Gwen Torrence	42.98	
2nd place, silver medalist(s)	Cuba	Miriam Ferrer, Aliuska López, Julia Duporty, Liliana Allen	43.37	
3rd place, bronze medalist(s)	Ukraine	Anzhela Kravchenko, Viktoriya Fomenko, Irina Slyusar, Antonina Slyusar	43.86	
4	Kazakhstan	Natalya Gridasova, Svetlana Vyazova, Natalya Serdyuk, Olga Shishigina	44.88	
5	Belarus	Natallia Solohub, Natalya Zhuk, Natalya Vinogradova, Tatyana Molchan	44.98	
	Russia	Anna Kosheleva, Galina Malchugina, Natalya Voronova, Marina Trandenkova	DNF	

=== 4 x 400 meters relay ===
Rank	Nation	Competitors	Time	Notes
1st place, gold medalist(s)	United States	Natasha Kaiser-Brown, Maicel Malone, Jearl Miles, Michelle Collins	3:22.27	
2nd place, silver medalist(s)	Russia	Yelena Andreyeva, Yelena Golesheva, Yelena Ruzina, Tatyana Zakharova	3:25.00	
3rd place, bronze medalist(s)	Cuba	Idalmis Bonne, Julia Duporty, Surella Morales, Nancy McLeón	3:26.35	
4	Ukraine	Olga Lysakova, Inna Neplyueva, Irina Omelchenko, Alla Shilkina	3:42.09	

=== 10,000 meters walk ===
Rank	Name	Nationality	Time	Notes
1st place, gold medalist(s)	Olimpiada Ivanova	Russia	42:30.31	
2nd place, silver medalist(s)	Yelena Sayko	Russia	42:43.23	
3rd place, bronze medalist(s)	Sari Essayah	Finland	42:45.04	
4	Yan Kong	China	43:39.39	
5	Yuliya Odzilyeva	Russia	43:45.80	
6	Tamara Kovalenko	Russia	44:00.49	
7	Nadezhda Ryashkina	Russia	44:15.76	
8	Lidiya Fesenko	Russia	44:41.42	
9	Michelle Rohl	United States	44:41.87	
10	Leonarda Yukhnevich	Belarus	45:47.18	
11	Lyudmila Savinova	Russia	46:12.02	
12	Li Chunxiu	China	46:12.05	
13	Vera Kozhomina	Russia	46:50.05	
14	Nina Alyushenko	Russia	46:58.43	
15	Yelena Veremeychuk	Ukraine	47:04.06	
16	Olga Kardopoltseva	Belarus	47:14.33	
	Kerry Saxby-Junna	Australia	DQ	

=== High jump ===
Rank	Name	Nationality	Result	Notes
1st place, gold medalist(s)	Silvia Costa	Cuba	1.95	
2nd place, silver medalist(s)	Yelena Topchina	Russia	1.93	
3rd place, bronze medalist(s)	Olga Bolșova	Moldova	1.93	
4	Ioamnet Quintero	Cuba	1.91	
4	Alison Inverarity	Australia	1.91	
6	Angela Bradburn	United States	1.88	
6	Valentīna Gotovska	Latvia	1.88	
6	Svetlana Leseva	Bulgaria	1.88	
6	Yelena Yelesina	Russia	1.88	

=== Pole vault ===
Rank	Name	Nationality	Result	Notes
1st place, gold medalist(s)	Sun Caiyun	China	4.00	GR
2nd place, silver medalist(s)	Svetlana Abramova	Russia	3.90	
3rd place, bronze medalist(s)	Andrea Müller	Germany	3.90	
4	Marina Andreyeva	Russia	3.80	
5	Galina Yenvarenko	Russia	3.70	
6	Natalya Mekhanoshina	Russia	3.50	
6	Melissa Price	United States	3.50	

=== Long jump ===
Rank	Name	Nationality	Result	Notes
1st place, gold medalist(s)	Heike Drechsler	Germany	7.12	
2nd place, silver medalist(s)	Svetlana Moskalets	Russia	6.82	
3rd place, bronze medalist(s)	Irina Mushailova	Russia	6.77	
4	Lyudmila Ninova	Austria	6.65	
5	Sheila Echols	United States	6.62	
6	Olga Rublyova	Russia	6.60	
7	Iva Prandzheva	Bulgaria	6.48	
8	Olga Vasilyeva	Kazakhstan	6.15	

=== Triple jump ===
Rank	Name	Nationality	Result	Notes
1st place, gold medalist(s)	Anna Biryukova	Russia	14.57	GR
2nd place, silver medalist(s)	Lyudmila Dubkova	Russia	13.99	
3rd place, bronze medalist(s)	Sheila Hudson	United States	13.97	
4	Marina Sokova	Russia	13.71	
5	Niurka Montalvo	Cuba	13.54	
6	Michelle Griffith	Great Britain	13.49	
7	Irina Melnikova	Russia	13.27	

=== Shot put ===
Rank	Name	Nationality	Result	Notes
1st place, gold medalist(s)	Sui Xinmei	China	20.15	
2nd place, silver medalist(s)	Huang Zhihong	China	20.08	
3rd place, bronze medalist(s)	Svetla Mitkova	Bulgaria	19.74	
4	Anna Romanova	Russia	19.51	
5	Larisa Peleshenko	Russia	19.05	
6	Kathrin Neimke	Germany	18.67	
7	Irina Khudoroshkina	Russia	18.13	
8	Connie Price-Smith	United States	17.86	
9	Belsy Laza	Cuba	17.53	

=== Discus throw ===
Rank	Name	Nationality	Result	Notes
1st place, gold medalist(s)	Bárbara Hechavarría	Cuba	64.84	
2nd place, silver medalist(s)	Olga Chernyavskaya	Russia	63.82	
3rd place, bronze medalist(s)	Daniela Costian	Australia	63.72	
4	Min Chunfeng	China	62.68	
5	Valentina Ivanova	Russia	60.02	
6	Connie Price-Smith	United States	57.80	

=== Javelin throw ===
Rank	Name	Nationality	Result	Notes
1st place, gold medalist(s)	Trine Hattestad	Norway	64.84	
2nd place, silver medalist(s)	Felicia Țilea	Romania	59.90	
3rd place, bronze medalist(s)	Oksana Yarygina	Uzbekistan	59.32	
4	Teresė Nekrošaitė	Lithuania	57.66	
5	Irina Kistyuchenkova	Ukraine	56.50	
6	Antanette Selenska	Bulgaria	56.04	
7	Lada Chernova	Russia	55.98	
8	Donna Mayhew	United States	55.56	
9	Yekaterina Ivakina	Russia	54.94	

=== Heptathlon ===
Rank	Name	Nationality	Result	Notes
1st place, gold medalist(s)	Jackie Joyner-Kersee	United States	6606	
2nd place, silver medalist(s)	Larisa Turchinskaya	Russia	6492	
3rd place, bronze medalist(s)	Ghada Shouaa	Syria	6361	
4	Kym Carter	United States	6292	
5	Jamie McNeair	United States	6186	
6	Irina Vostrikova	Russia	6052	
7	Liu Bo	China	6000	
8	Svetlana Tkacheva	Russia	5849	
