= 1995 IAAF Grand Prix Final =

- Host city: Fontvieille, Monaco
- Events: 18
- Dates: 9 September
- Main venue: Stade Louis II

The 1995 IAAF Grand Prix Final was the eleventh edition of the season-ending competition for the IAAF Grand Prix track and field circuit, organised by the International Association of Athletics Federations. It was held on 9 September at the Stade Louis II in Fontvieille, Monaco.

Moses Kiptanui (3000 metres steeplechase) and Maria Mutola (800 metres) were the overall points winners of the tournament. Mutola became the first African woman to win the overall series. A total of 18 athletics events were contested, ten for men and eight for women.

== Medal summary ==
=== Men ===
Event	Gold		Silver		Bronze	
Overall	Moses Kiptanui (KEN)	84	Jan Železný (CZE)	72	Mark Crear (USA)	72
200 metres	Michael Johnson (USA)	19.93	Frankie Fredericks (NAM)	20.21	Robson da Silva (BRA)	20.27
800 metres	Benson Koech (KEN)	1:45.27	Wilson Kipketer (DEN)	1:45.28	Mahjoub Haïda (MAR)	1:45.35
3000 metres	Haile Gebrselassie (ETH)	7:35.90	Vénuste Niyongabo (BDI)	7:35.91	Khalid Boulami (MAR)	7:36.11
3000 metres steeplechase	Moses Kiptanui (KEN)	8:02.45	Richard Kosgei (KEN)	8:06.88	Eliud Barngetuny (KEN)	8:07.42
110 m hurdles	Mark Crear (USA)	13.07	Allen Johnson (USA)	13.09	Florian Schwarthoff (GER)	13.29
Pole vault	Okkert Brits (RSA)	5.95 m	Sergey Bubka (UKR)	5.90 m	Maksim Tarasov (RUS)	5.80 m
Long jump	Iván Pedroso (CUB)	8.49 m	Kareem Streete-Thompson (USA)	8.46 m	James Beckford (JAM)	8.20 m
Discus throw	Lars Riedel (GER)	67.78 m	Sergey Lyakhov (RUS)	66.78 m	Vladimir Dubrovshchik (BLR)	66.60 m
Javelin throw	Jan Železný (CZE)	92.28 m	Raymond Hecht (GER)	87.42 m	Steve Backley (GBR)	83.84 m

=== Women ===
Event	Gold		Silver		Bronze	
Overall	Maria Mutola (MOZ)	78	Anna Biryukova (RUS)	72	Gwen Torrence (USA)	72
200 metres	Gwen Torrence (USA)	22.20	Mary Onyali (NGR)	22.69	Carlette Guidry (USA)	22.71
800 metres	Maria Mutola (MOZ)	1:55.72	Kelly Holmes (GBR)	1:56.21	Patricia Djaté (FRA)	1:56.53
3000 metres	Sonia O'Sullivan (IRL)	8:39.94	Olga Churbanova (RUS)	8:41.42	Yvonne Graham (JAM)	8:42.40
400 m hurdles	Kim Batten (USA)	53.49	Tonja Buford (USA)	53.69	Deon Hemmings (JAM)	54.20
High jump	Inga Babakova (UKR)	2.03 m	Tatyana Motkova (RUS)	2.01 m	Yelena Gulyayeva (RUS)	1.96 m
Triple jump	Anna Biryukova (RUS)	14.99 m	Inessa Kravets (UKR)	14.59 m	Inna Lasovskaya (RUS)	14.59 m
Shot put	Astrid Kumbernuss (GER)	20.20 m	Kathrin Neimke (GER)	19.94 m	Huang Zhihong (CHN)	19.94 m
