= IAAF Grand Prix Final =

Athletics competition featuring track and field events

- Sport: Track and field
- Founder: International Association of Athletics Federations
- First season: 1985
- Folded: 2002
- Replaced by: IAAF Golden League
- Continent: Worldwide
- Qualification: IAAF Grand Prix

The IAAF Grand Prix Final was an athletics competition featuring track and field events staged by the International Association of Athletics Federations. It was first held in 1985 and replaced in 2003 by the IAAF World Athletics Final. For the most part of its history, the events were staged in early September in European major cities which also played host to prominent annual athletics meetings. Fukuoka City became the first non-European host in 1997. Doha followed in 2000 (also the first time the event was staged in October) and Melbourne was that last non-European host before the final edition of the competition was held in Paris in 2002.

The event programme was half that of a full traditional track and field programme, with events alternating each edition. For example, a men's 100 metres and women's 200 metres were contested in 1985, but not vice versa – that arrangement was reversed in 1986 and reversed again in 1987, and so forth. Middle-distance running was particularly prominent as a 1500 metres or a mile run were held at every edition of the tournament.

From 1982 to 1992, the winners of the Grand Prix title in an event were decided by the overall seasonal points rankings gained from competing on the IAAF Grand Prix circuit. This was amended in 1993 when seasonal points served as a method of qualifying for the final, with the event winner being the victor at the Grand Prix Final event. The athlete with the greatest number of points accumulated in the season across all events was declared the overall Grand Prix Final champion.

The Grand Prix Final had had a number of world records set in its history, including the Tim Montgomery 100 metres record that was later taken from him after the BALCO scandal.

== Editions ==
Edition	Year	Dates	Host stadium	Host city	Host country	Events
1st	1985	7 September	Olympic Stadium	Rome	Italy	16
2nd	1986	10 September	Olympic Stadium	Rome	Italy	17
3rd	1987	11 September	King Baudouin Stadium	Brussels	Belgium	17
4th	1988	26 August	Olympic Stadium	West Berlin	West Berlin	17
5th	1989	1 September	Stade Louis II	Fontvieille	Monaco	17
6th	1990	7 September	Olympic Stadium	Athens	Greece	18
7th	1991	20 September	Estadi Olímpic Lluís Companys	Barcelona	Spain	17
8th	1992	4 September	Stadio delle Alpi	Turin	Italy	18
9th	1993	10 September	Crystal Palace National Sports Centre	London	United Kingdom	18
10th	1994	3 September	Stade Sébastien Charléty	Paris	France	17
11th	1995	9 September	Stade Louis II	Fontvieille	Monaco	18
12th	1996	7 September	Arena Civica	Milan	Italy	18
13th	1997	13 September	Hakatanomori Athletic Stadium	Fukuoka City	Japan	18
14th	1998	5 September	Luzhniki Stadium	Moscow	Russia	18
15th	1999	11 September	Olympic Stadium	Munich	Germany	18
16th	2000	5 October	Khalifa International Stadium	Doha	Qatar	18
17th	2001	9 September	Olympic Park Stadium	Melbourne	Australia	19
18th	2002	14 September	Stade Sébastien Charléty	Paris	France	18

== Overall points leaders ==
=== Men ===
Year	Gold		Silver		Bronze	
1985	Doug Padilla (USA)	63	Mike Franks (USA)	60	Sergey Bubka (URS)	59
1986	Saïd Aouita (MAR)	63	Andre Phillips (USA)	61	Steve Scott (USA)	61
1987	Tonie Campbell (USA)	63	Greg Foster (USA)	59	Sergey Bubka (URS)	58
1988	Saïd Aouita (MAR)	63	Mike Conley, Sr. (USA)	61	Danny Harris (USA)	58
1989	Saïd Aouita (MAR)	69	Roger Kingdom (USA)	63	Steve Backley (GBR)	63
1990	Leroy Burrell (USA)	63	Noureddine Morceli (ALG)	61	Danny Harris (USA)	59
1991	Sergey Bubka (URS)	69	Jan Železný (TCH)	63	Michael Johnson (USA)	63
1992	Kevin Young (USA)	63	Werner Günthör (SUI)	63	Igor Astapkovich (EUN)	59
1993	Sergey Bubka (UKR)	72	Jan Železný (CZE)	72	Colin Jackson (GBR)	72
1994	Noureddine Morceli (ALG)	78	Samuel Matete (ZAM)	72	Mike Conley, Sr. (USA)	72
1995	Moses Kiptanui (KEN)	84	Jan Železný (CZE)	72	Mark Crear (USA)	72
1996	Daniel Komen (KEN)	103	Jonathan Edwards (GBR)	99	Dennis Mitchell (USA)	95
1997	Wilson Kipketer (DEN)	114	Lars Riedel (GER)	99	Mark Crear (USA)	95
1998	Hicham El Guerrouj (MAR)	136	Haile Gebrselassie (ETH)	114	Bryan Bronson (USA)	97
1999	Bernard Barmasai (KEN)	111	Konstadinos Gatsioudis (GRE)	109	Wilson Kipketer (DEN)	108
2000	Angelo Taylor (USA)	101	Yuriy Bilonoh (UKR)	94	Adam Nelson (USA)	93
2001	André Bucher (SUI)	102	Allen Johnson (USA)	101	Hicham El Guerrouj (MAR)	100
2002	Hicham El Guerrouj (MAR)	116	Félix Sánchez (DOM)	116	Christian Olsson (SWE)	102

=== Women ===
Year	Gold		Silver		Bronze	
1985	Mary Slaney (USA)	69	Stefka Kostadinova (BUL)	63	Judi Brown-King (USA)	63
1986	Yordanka Donkova (BUL)	69	Maricica Puică (ROM)	65	Tsvetanka Khristova (BUL)	63
1987	Merlene Ottey (JAM)	63	Doina Melinte (ROM)	63	Stefka Kostadinova (BUL)	61
1988	Paula Ivan (ROM)	63	Grace Jackson (JAM)	63	Ana Fidelia Quirot (CUB)	57
1989	Paula Ivan (ROM)	67	Galina Chistyakova (URS)	63	Sandra Farmer-Patrick (USA)	63
1990	Merlene Ottey (JAM)	63	Heike Drechsler (GDR)	63	Petra Felke (GDR)	63
1991	Heike Henkel (GER)	63	Merlene Ottey (JAM)	63	Natalya Artyomova (URS)	63
1992	Heike Drechsler (GER)	63	Merlene Ottey (JAM)	61	Trine Hattestad (NOR)	59
1993	Sandra Farmer-Patrick (USA)	72	Sonia O'Sullivan (IRL)	72	Stefka Kostadinova (BUL)	72
1994	Jackie Joyner-Kersee (USA)	72	Svetla Dimitrova (BUL)	72	Sonia O'Sullivan (IRL)	72
1995	Maria Mutola (MOZ)	78	Anna Biryukova (RUS)	72	Gwen Torrence (USA)	72
1996	Ludmila Engquist (SWE)	93	Merlene Ottey (JAM)	90	Michelle Freeman (JAM)	85
1997	Astrid Kumbernuss (GER)	99	Deon Hemmings (JAM)	93	Kim Batten (USA)	91
1998	Marion Jones (USA)	130	Svetlana Masterkova (RUS)	107	Falilat Ogunkoya (NGR)	101
1999	Gabriela Szabo (ROM)	108	Maria Mutola (MOZ)	108	Deon Hemmings (JAM)	104
2000	Trine Hattestad (NOR)	110	Marion Jones (USA)	104	Gail Devers (USA)	104
2001	Violeta Szekely (ROM)	116	Maria Mutola (MOZ)	105	Tatyana Tereshchuk (UKR)	96
2002	Marion Jones (USA)	116	Gail Devers (USA)	111	Ana Guevara (MEX)	108
