= 1997 IAAF Grand Prix Final =

International athletics competition

- Host city: Fukuoka City, Japan
- Events: 18
- Dates: 13 September
- Main venue: Hakatanomori Athletic Stadium

The 1997 IAAF Grand Prix Final was the thirteenth edition of the season-ending competition for the IAAF Grand Prix track and field circuit, organised by the International Association of Athletics Federations. It was held on 13 September at the Hakatanomori Athletic Stadium in Fukuoka City, Japan.

Wilson Kipketer (800 metres) and Astrid Kumbernuss (shot put) were the overall points winners of the tournament. A total of 18 athletics events were contested, ten for men and eight for women.

== Medal summary ==
=== Men ===
Event	Gold		Silver		Bronze	
Overall	Wilson Kipketer (DEN)	114	Lars Riedel (GER)	99	Mark Crear (USA)	95
200 metres	Frankie Fredericks (NAM)	19.81	Obadele Thompson (BAR)	20.19	Jon Drummond (USA)	20.32
800 metres	Wilson Kipketer (DEN)	1:42.98	Patrick Ndururi (KEN)	1:43.45	David Kiptoo (KEN)	1:44.09
One mile	Robert Kiplagat Andersen (DEN)	4:04.53	Hicham El Guerrouj (MAR)	4:04.55	Vénuste Niyongabo (BDI)	4:04.95
5000 metres	Khalid Boulami (MAR)	13:09.40	Tom Nyariki (KEN)	13:10.41	Paul Koech (KEN)	13:10.77
3000 metres steeplechase	Joseph Keter (KEN)	8:21.75	Moses Kiptanui (KEN)	8:21.87	Bernard Barmasai (KEN)	8:22.48
110 m hurdles	Mark Crear (USA)	13.03	Florian Schwarthoff (GER)	13.11	Tony Jarrett (GBR)	13.14
Pole vault	Sergey Bubka (UKR)	6.05 m	Maksim Tarasov (RUS)	6.00 m	Tim Lobinger (GER)	5.90 m
Long jump	Iván Pedroso (CUB)	8.53 m	James Beckford (JAM)	8.40 m	Erick Walder (USA)	8.40w m
Discus throw	Lars Riedel (GER)	67.98 m	Adam Setliff (USA)	66.12 m	John Godina (USA)	65.56 m
Javelin throw	Jan Železný (CZE)	89.58 m	Boris Henry (GER)	86.76 m	Patrik Bodén (SWE)	86.52 m

=== Women ===
Event	Gold		Silver		Bronze	
Overall	Astrid Kumbernuss (GER)	99	Deon Hemmings (JAM)	93	Kim Batten (USA)	91
200 metres	Marion Jones (USA)	21.84w	Merlene Ottey (JAM)	21.92w	Melinda Gainsford-Taylor (AUS)	22.43w
800 metres	Ana Fidelia Quirot (CUB)	1:56.53	Maria Mutola (MOZ)	1:56.93	Letitia Vriesde (SUR)	1:59.73
One mile	Carla Sacramento (POR)	4:40.25	Jackline Maranga (KEN)	4:40.44	Julie Henner (USA)	4:40.92
5000 metres	Sally Barsosio (KEN)	15:13.46	Lydia Cheromei (KEN)	15:15.64	Paula Radcliffe (GBR)	15:17.02
400 m hurdles	Kim Batten (USA)	53.45	Deon Hemmings (JAM)	53.98	Tatyana Tereshchuk (UKR)	54.37
High jump	Inga Babakova (UKR)	2.02 m	Yuliya Lyakhova (RUS)	1.99 m	Monica Iagar (ROM)	1.96 m
Triple jump	Ashia Hansen (GBR)	15.15 m	Šárka Kašpárková (CZE)	14.94w m	Rodica Mateescu (ROM)	14.59 m
Shot put	Astrid Kumbernuss (GER)	20.95 m	Vita Pavlysh (UKR)	20.59 m	Irina Korzhanenko (RUS)	19.06 m
