= Athletics at the 1996 Summer Olympics – Women's 400 metres hurdles =

Women's 400 metres hurdles at the Games of the XXVI Olympiad
- Venue: Centennial Olympic Stadium
- Dates: 28 July 1996 (heats); 29 July 1996 (semi-finals); 31 July 1996 (final)
- Competitors: 29 from 22 nations
- Winning time: 52.82 OR

Medalists
1st place, gold medalist(s)		Deon Hemmings; Jamaica
2nd place, silver medalist(s)		Kim Batten; United States
3rd place, bronze medalist(s)		Tonja Buford-Bailey; United States

These are the official results of the Women's 400m Hurdles at the 1996 Summer Olympics in Atlanta. There were 30 competitors.

== Results ==
=== Heats ===
Qualification: First 3 in each heat (Q) and the next 4 fastest (q) qualified to the semifinals.

Rank	Heat	Name	Nationality	Time	Notes
1	4	Deon Hemmings	Jamaica	54.70	Q
2	1	Guðrún Arnardóttir	Iceland	54.88	Q
3	4	Heike Meissner	Germany	55.05	Q
4	4	Susan Smith	Ireland	55.22	Q
5	2	Tonja Buford-Bailey	United States	55.23	Q
6	2	Sally Gunnell	Great Britain	55.29	Q
7	2	Silvia Rieger	Germany	55.33	Q
8	1	Sandra Farmer-Patrick	United States	55.55	Q
9	1	Debbie Parris	Jamaica	55.64	Q
9	2	Rosey Edeh	Canada	55.64	q
11	1	Michèle Schenk	Switzerland	55.70	q
12	1	Tatyana Ledovskaya	Belarus	55.82	q
13	3	Kim Batten	United States	54.92	Q
14	4	Ionela Târlea	Romania	55.42	q
15	3	Tetyana Tereshchuk	Ukraine	55.82	Q
16	3	Ann Mercken	Belgium	55.88	Q
17	2	Natalya Torshina	Kazakhstan	55.94	
18	4	Lana Jēkabsone	Latvia	56.18	
19	3	Anna Knoroz	Russia	56.21	
20	3	Catherine Scott-Pomales	Jamaica	56.21	
21	2	Martina Stoop	Switzerland	56.32	
22	2	Miriam Alonso	Spain	56.53	
23	2	Lade Akinremi	Nigeria	56.83	
24	4	Nelli Voronkova	Belarus	56.97	
25	3	Karen van der Veen	South Africa	57.00	
26	1	Virna De Angeli	Italy	57.12	
27	3	Tanya Kurochkina	Belarus	57.28	
28	4	Eva Paniagua	Spain	58.10	
29	1	Mary-Estelle Kapalu	Vanuatu	58.68	
30	1	Hsu Pei-chin	Chinese Taipei	58.80	

=== Semifinals ===
Qualification: First 4 in each heat (Q) qualified directly to the final.

Rank	Heat	Lane	Name	Nationality	Time	Notes
1	1	3	Deon Hemmings	Jamaica	52.99	Q
2	1	6	Tonja Buford-Bailey	United States	53.38	Q
3	2	6	Kim Batten	United States	53.65	Q
4	1	4	Heike Meissner	Germany	54.27	Q
4	2	7	Silvia Rieger	Germany	54.27	Q
6	1	2	Ionela Târlea	Romania	54.41	Q
7	2	2	Rosey Edeh	Canada	54.49	Q
8	2	1	Debbie Parris	Jamaica	54.72	Q
9	2	5	Sandra Farmer-Patrick	United States	54.73	
10	2	4	Guðrún Arnardóttir	Iceland	54.81	
11	1	8	Susan Smith	Ireland	54.93	
12	1	1	Ann Mercken	Belgium	54.95	
13	1	7	Tatyana Ledovskaya	Belarus	54.99	
41	1	5	Tetyana Tereshchuk	Ukraine	55.34	
15	2	8	Michèle Schenk	Switzerland	55.96	
	2	3	Sally Gunnell	Great Britain	DNF	

=== Final ===
Rank	Lane	Name	Nationality	Time	Notes
1st place, gold medalist(s)	5	Deon Hemmings	Jamaica	52.82	OR
2nd place, silver medalist(s)	6	Kim Batten	United States	53.08	
3rd place, bronze medalist(s)	4	Tonja Buford-Bailey	United States	53.22	
4	2	Debbie Parris	Jamaica	53.97	
5	1	Heike Meissner	Germany	54.03	
6	7	Rosey Edeh	Canada	54.39	
7	8	Ionela Târlea	Romania	54.40	
8	3	Silvia Rieger	Germany	54.57	

== See also ==
- Men's 400m hurdles
- Women's 100m hurdles
