= Athletics at the 1989 Summer Universiade – Women's 400 metres hurdles =

The women's 400 metres hurdles event at the 1989 Summer Universiade was held at the Wedaustadion in Duisburg on 27 and 28 August 1989.

== Medalists ==
Gold	Silver	Bronze
Margarita Khromova; Soviet Union	Rosey Edeh; Canada	Claudia Zaczkiewicz; West Germany

== Results ==
=== Heats ===
Rank	Heat	Athlete	Nationality	Time	Notes
1	3	Rosey Edeh	Canada	56.90	Q
2	1	Irmgard Trojer	Italy	57.25	Q
3	2	Margarita Khromova	Soviet Union	57.56	Q
4	1	Ulrike Heinz	West Germany	57.57	Q
5	2	Sabine Alber	West Germany	57.72	Q
6	2	Elsa Jiménez	Cuba	57.89	q
7	1	Olga Nazarova	Soviet Union	58.10	q
8	3	Maria Luisa Climbini	Italy	58.21	Q
9	3	Janeene Vickers	United States	58.51	
10	1	Małgorzata Płatek	Poland	59.38	
11	1	Esther Lahoz	Spain	59.74	
12	3	Corinne Pierre-Joseph	France	59.78	
13	1	Puak Neiger	Israel	59.99	
14	2	Jill McDermid	Canada	1:00.03	
15	3	Barbro Syvertsen	Norway	1:01.46	
16	2	Chang Feng-hua	Chinese Taipei	1:01.78	
17	2	Mimi King	United States	1:04.29	

=== Final ===
Rank	Athlete	Nationality	Time	Notes
1st place, gold medalist(s)	Margarita Khromova	Soviet Union	57.03	
2nd place, silver medalist(s)	Rosey Edeh	Canada	57.06	
3rd place, bronze medalist(s)	Irmgard Trojer	Italy	57.94	
4	Ulrike Heinz	West Germany	58.10	
5	Elsa Jiménez	Cuba	58.43	
6	Olga Nazarova	Soviet Union	58.68	
7	Maria Luisa Climbini	Italy	59.09	
8	Sabine Alber	West Germany	59.29	
