= Andrew Hermann =

American racewalker (born 1971)

Personal information
- Born: February 25, 1971 (age 55) Newport, Oregon, U.S.

Sport
- Country: United States
- Sport: Athletics
- Event: Race walk

Andrew Hermann (born February 25, 1971) is an American racewalker.

Hermann was born in Newport, Oregon. He finished 31st at the 2000 Summer Olympics in Sydney, in the men's 50 kilometres walk. He competed at the 1997 and 1999 World Championships but was disqualified, and did not finish at the 1994 Goodwill Games.
