= 2001 IAAF Grand Prix Final =

- Host city: Melbourne, Australia
- Events: 19
- Dates: 9 September
- Main venue: Olympic Park Stadium

The 2001 IAAF Grand Prix Final was the seventeenth edition of the season-ending competition for the IAAF Grand Prix track and field circuit, organised by the International Association of Athletics Federations. It was held on 9 September at the Olympic Park Stadium in Melbourne, Australia. It was the first and only time the event was held in the southern hemisphere (international track and field seasons typically revolve around a northern hemisphere schedule).

André Bucher (800 metres) and Violeta Szekely (1500 metres) were the overall points winners of the tournament. A total of 19 athletics events were contested, nine for men and ten for women. This was the first time women's events outnumbered men's on the programme of the IAAF Grand Prix Final.

== Medal summary ==
=== Men ===
Event	Gold		Silver		Bronze	
Overall	André Bucher (SUI)	102	Allen Johnson (USA)	101	Hicham El Guerrouj (MAR)	100
200 metres	Shawn Crawford (USA)	20.37	Bernard Williams (USA)	20.39	Francis Obikwelu (NGR)	20.52
800 metres	André Bucher (SUI)	1:46.71	Yuriy Borzakovskiy (RUS)	1:46.78	Jean-Patrick Nduwimana (BDI)	1:46.88
1500 metres	Hicham El Guerrouj (MAR)	3:31.25	Bernard Lagat (KEN)	3:32.10	William Chirchir (KEN)	3:34.06
3000 metres	Paul Bitok (KEN)	7:53.85	Kenenisa Bekele (ETH)	7:54.39	Luke Kipkosgei (KEN)	7:54.39
3000 metres steeplechase	Brahim Boulami (MAR)	8:16.14	Reuben Kosgei (KEN)	8:17.64	Stephen Cherono (KEN)	8:18.85
110 m hurdles	Anier García (CUB)	13.22	Allen Johnson (USA)	13.28	Dominique Arnold (USA)	13.43
Long jump	Younès Moudrik (MAR)	8.23 m	Savanté Stringfellow (USA)	8.19 m	Aleksey Lukashevich (UKR)	7.93 m
Discus throw	Virgilijus Alekna (LTU)	64.42 m	Aleksander Tammert (EST)	63.87 m	Frantz Kruger (RSA)	63.61 m
Javelin throw	Jan Železný (CZE)	88.98 m	Ēriks Rags (LAT)	85.75 m	Boris Henry (GER)	85.43 m

=== Women ===
Event	Gold		Silver		Bronze	
Overall	Violeta Szekely (ROM)	116	Maria Mutola (MOZ)	105	Tatyana Tereshchuk (UKR)	96
200 metres	Myriam Léonie Mani (CMR)	22.93	Debbie Ferguson (BAH)	23.00	Juliet Campbell (JAM)	23.15
800 metres	Maria Mutola (MOZ)	1:59.78	Kelly Holmes (GBR)	2:00.02	Stephanie Graf (AUT)	2:00.40
1500 metres	Violeta Szekely (ROM)	4:03.46	Carla Sacramento (POR)	4:04.41	Natalya Gorelova (RUS)	4:06.48
3000 metres	Tatyana Tomashova (RUS)	9:30.39	Leah Malot (KEN)	9:31.41	Olga Yegorova (RUS)	9:31.82
400 m hurdles	Tonja Buford-Bailey (USA)	54.58	Tatyana Tereshchuk (UKR)	54.78	Sandra Glover (USA)	55.01
High jump	Hestrie Cloete (RSA)	1.98 m	Inga Babakova (UKR)	1.96 m	Amy Acuff (USA)	1.96 m
Pole vault	Stacy Dragila (USA)	4.50 m	Svetlana Feofanova (RUS)	4.45 m	Kellie Suttle (USA)	4.45 m
Triple jump	Tereza Marinova (BUL)	14.77 m	Tatyana Lebedeva (RUS)	14.61 m	Françoise Mbango Etone (CMR)	14.47 m
Shot put	Astrid Kumbernuss (GER)	18.94 m	Nadezhda Ostapchuk (BLR)	18.92 m	Svetlana Krivelyova (RUS)	18.21 m
Hammer throw	Kamila Skolimowska (POL)	71.71 m	Bronwyn Eagles (AUS)	68.38 m	Olga Kuzenkova (RUS)	68.27 m
