= Olga Nazarova (hurdler) =

Russian former athlete (born 1962)

Personal information
- Born: 28 February 1962 (age 64)

Sport
- Sport: Track and field

Olga M. Nazarova (born 28 February 1962) is a Russian former athlete who competed mainly in the 400 metres hurdles. She achieved her best time in the 400 m hurdles with 54.82 secs at the Athletissima on 6 July 1994, and won the 400 m hurdles title at the 1995 Russian Athletics Championships.

== International competitions ==
Year	Competition	Venue	Position	Notes
Representing the Soviet Union
1989	Universiade	Duisburg, West Germany	6th	58.68
Representing Russia
1993	World Championships	Stuttgart, Germany	13th (sf)	55.51
1994	Goodwill Games	Saint Petersburg, Russia	5th	55.24
1994	European Championships	Helsinki, Finland	7th	55.98
1995	World Championships	Gothenburg, Sweden	10th (sf)	56.89
(sf) Indicates overall position in semifinal round
