= Karen van der Veen =

South African hurdler (born 1966)

Personal information
- Nationality: South African
- Born: 7 January 1966 (age 60) East London, South Africa

Sport
- Sport: Track and field
- Event: 400 metres hurdles
Medal record
Women's athletics
Representing South Africa
African Championships
Silver medal – second place	1992 Belle Vue Harel	100 m hurdles

Karen van der Veen (born 7 January 1966) is a South African hurdler. She competed in the women's 400 metres hurdles at the 1996 Summer Olympics.
