= Lana Jēkabsone =

Latvian hurdler

Personal information
- Nationality: Latvian
- Born: 16 October 1974 (age 51)

Sport
- Sport: Track and field
- Event: 400 metres hurdles

Lana Jēkabsone (born 16 October 1974) is a Latvian hurdler. She competed in the women's 400 metres hurdles at the 1996 Summer Olympics.
