= Michèle Schenk =

Swiss hurdler

Personal information
- Nationality: Swiss
- Born: 8 March 1974 (age 52) Bern, Switzerland

Sport
- Sport: Track and field
- Event: 400 metres hurdles

Michèle Schenk (born 8 March 1974) is a Swiss hurdler. She competed in the women's 400 metres hurdles at the 1996 Summer Olympics.
