= Silvia Rieger =

German hurdler

Personal information
- Full name: Silvia Sabine Rieger
- Nationality: German
- Born: November 14, 1970 (age 55) Hinte, West Germany
- Height: 1.75 m (5 ft 9 in)
- Weight: 60 kg (132 lb)

Sport
- Country: Germany
- Sport: Track and field
- Event: Hurdling

Achievements and titles
- Personal best: 400 m hurdles: 54.22 (1998)
Medal record
Women's athletics
Representing Germany
European Championships
| Gold medal – first place | 1998 Budapest | 4×400 m |
| Silver medal – second place | 1994 Helsinki | 400 m hurdles |
| Silver medal – second place | 1998 Budapest | 400 m hurdles |

Silvia Sabine Rieger (born 14 November 1970) is a retired German athlete who specialized in the 400 metres hurdles.

Her personal best time in the 400 metres is 54.22 seconds, achieved at the 1998 IAAF World Cup in Johannesburg. This places her sixth on the German all-time list, behind Sabine Busch, Cornelia Ullrich, Ellen Fiedler, Heike Meissner and Gudrun Abt.

She competed at the 1992 Summer Olympics and the 1996 Summer Olympics.

== Achievements ==
| Year | Competition | Venue | Position | Event | Notes |
Representing West Germany
| 1987 | European Junior Championships | Birmingham, England | 1st | 400 m hrd | 57.44 |
| 1988 | World Junior Championships | Sudbury, Canada | 3rd | 400 m hrd | 57.88 |
| 1989 | European Junior Championships | Varaždin, Yugoslavia | 1st | 400 m hrd | 56.39 |
| 1990 | European Championships | Split, Yugoslavia | 10th (sf) | 400 m hurdles | 56.11 |
Representing Germany
| 1994 | European Championships | Helsinki, Finland | 2nd | 400 m hrd | 54.68 |
| 1994 | World Cup | London, England | 2nd | 400 m hrd | 56.14 |
| 1995 | World Championships | Gothenburg, Sweden | 6th | 400 m hrd | 55.01 |
| 1996 | Olympic Games | Atlanta, United States | 8th | 400 m hrd | 54.57 |
| 1998 | European Championships | Budapest, Hungary | 3rd | 400 m hrd | 54.45 |
| 1998 | European Championships | Budapest, Hungary | 1st | 4 × 400 m relay | 3:23.03 |
| 1998 | World Cup | Johannesburg, South Africa | 5th | 400 m hrd | 54.22 |
