= Nezha Bidouane =

Moroccan hurdler (born 1969)

Medal record

Women's athletics

Representing Morocco

Olympic Games
Bronze medal – third place	2000 Sydney	400 m hurdles

World Championships
Gold medal – first place	1997 Athens	400 m hurdles
Gold medal – first place	2001 Edmonton	400 m hurdles
Silver medal – second place	1999 Seville	400 m hurdles

African Championships
Gold medal – first place	1990 Cairo	400 m hurdles
Gold medal – first place	1998 Dakar	400 m hurdles
Silver medal – second place	1990 Cairo	100 m hurdles
Bronze medal – third place	1988 Annaba	4×400 m

Mediterranean Games
Gold medal – first place	1991 Athens	400 m hurdles
Gold medal – first place	1993 Narbonne	400 m hurdles
Gold medal – first place	1997 Bari	400 m hurdles

Nezha Bidouane (Arabic: نزهة بدوان; born on 18 September 1969 in Rabat) is a retired Moroccan track and field hurdler who specialised in the 400 metres hurdles. A two-time World champion, she won the 400 m hurdles gold medal at the 1997 World Championships in Athens and the 2001 World Championships in Edmonton. In 1999, she won the silver medal at the World Championships in an African record time of 52.90 seconds. In 2000, she won the bronze medal at the Olympic Games.

Bidouane oversees the annual Women's Race to Victory 8K road race in Rabat.

== Competition record ==
Year	Competition	Venue	Position	Event	Notes
Representing Morocco
1986	Arab Junior Championships	Cairo, Egypt	1st	100 m hurdles	15.20
1986	Arab Junior Championships	Cairo, Egypt	2nd	400 m hurdles	65.50
1987	Arab Championships	Algiers, Algeria	3rd	100 m hurdles	14.72
1987	Mediterranean Games	Latakia, Syria	5th	100 m hurdles	14.76
1988	African Championships	Annaba, Algeria	3rd	4 × 400 m relay	3:50.25
1989	Jeux de la Francophonie	Casablanca, Morocco	6th	400 m hurdles	59.69
1989	Arab Championships	Cairo, Egypt	2nd	100 m hurdles	14.0
1989	Arab Championships	Cairo, Egypt	3rd	400 m hurdles	60.3
1990	Maghreb Championships	Algiers, Algeria	1st	100 m hurdles	13.6
1990	Maghreb Championships	Algiers, Algeria	1st	400 m hurdles	56.3
1990	African Championships	Cairo, Egypt	2nd	100 m hurdles	13.70
1990	African Championships	Cairo, Egypt	1st	400 m hurdles	57.17
1991	World Indoor Championships	Seville, Spain	14th (h)	400 m	55.69
1991	World Indoor Championships	Seville, Spain	23rd (h)	60 m hurdles	8.74
1991	Mediterranean Games	Athens, Greece	4th	100 m hurdles	13.61
1991	Mediterranean Games	Athens, Greece	1st	400 m hurdles	55.13
1991	Mediterranean Games	Athens, Greece	4th	4 × 100 m relay	46.05
1991	Mediterranean Games	Athens, Greece	4th	4 × 400 m relay	3:39.46
1991	World Championships	Tokyo, Japan	16th (sf)	400 m hurdles	56.62
1992	Olympic Games	Barcelona, Spain	11th (sf)	400 m hurdles	55.08
1992	World Cup	Havana, Cuba	6th	400 m hurdles	58.30^{1}
1993	Mediterranean Games	Narbonne, France	1st	400 m hurdles	56.09
1993	World Championships	Stuttgart, Germany	–	400 m hurdles	DNF
1994	Jeux de la Francophonie	Paris, France	2nd	400 m hurdles	55.19
1994	World Cup	London, United Kingdom	5th	400 m hurdles	57.35^{1}
1994	World Cup	London, United Kingdom	–	4 × 400 m relay	DQ^{1}
1995	World Championships	Gothenburg, Sweden	–	400 m hurdles	DQ
1995	Arab Championships	Cairo, Egypt	1st	100 m hurdles	13.44
1995	Arab Championships	Cairo, Egypt	1st	400 m hurdles	56.96
1997	World Indoor Championships	Paris, France	16th (h)	400 m	53.54
1997	Mediterranean Games	Bari, Italy	1st	400 m hurdles	55.01
1997	World Championships	Athens, Greece	1st	400 m hurdles	52.97
1998	African Championships	Dakar, Senegal	1st	400 m hurdles	54.24
1998	World Cup	Johannesburg, South Africa	1st	400 m hurdles	52.96^{1}
1999	World Championships	Seville, Spain	2nd	400 m hurdles	52.90
2000	Olympic Games	Sydney, Australia	3rd	400 m hurdles	53.57
2001	Jeux de la Francophonie	Ottawa, Canada	1st	400 m hurdles	54.91
2001	World Championships	Edmonton, Canada	1st	400 m hurdles	53.34
2001	Goodwill Games	Brisbane, Australia	5th	400 m hurdles	56.10
2004	Olympic Games	Athens, Greece	18th (h)	400 m hurdles	55.69
2004	Pan Arab Games	Algiers, Algeria	1st	400 m hurdles	55.98
2004	Pan Arab Games	Algiers, Algeria	1st	4 × 100 m relay	46.32
2004	Pan Arab Games	Algiers, Algeria	1st	4 × 400 m relay	3:38.24

^{1}Representing Africa

Olympic Games
Preceded by Adil Belgaïd	Flag bearer for Morocco; 2004 Athens	Succeeded by Abdelkader Kada
Sporting positions
Preceded by Deon Hemmings; Irina Privalova	Women's 400 m Hurdles Best Year Performance; 1997; 2001	Succeeded by Kim Batten; Yuliya Pechonkina
