= Anna Knoroz =

Russian hurdler (born 1970)

Personal information
- Born: 30 July 1970 (age 56) Moscow, Soviet Union

Sport
- Sport: Track and field
Medal record
Representing Soviet Union
World Championships
Gold medal – first place	1991 Tokyo	4x400 m relay
Summer Universiade
Silver medal – second place	1991 Sheffield	4x400 m relay
Bronze medal – third place	1991 Sheffield	400 m hurdles
Representing Russia
European Championships
Bronze medal – third place	1994 Helsinki	400 m hurdles

Anna Mikhaylovna Knoroz (Russian: Анна Михайловна Кнороз; née Chuprina; born 30 July 1970) is a retired Russian hurdler who specialised in the 400 metres hurdles. She won a bronze medal in the 400 m hurdles at the 1994 European Championships, and a gold medal in the 4 × 400 metres relay at the 1991 World Championships (ran in heats only). She also competed at the 1996 Atlanta Olympics.

As a junior, she won the silver medal at the 1989 European Junior Championships. In her early senior career she had modest success in hurdling in global events. She competed at the 1991 World Championships, the 1993 World Championships, the 1996 Olympic Games and the 1997 World Championships without reaching the final. She nonetheless won two major medals in her career. First, she ran in the heats on the Soviet team that eventually won the 4 × 400 metres relay at the 1991 World Championships. She also won the 400 metres hurdles bronze medal at the 1994 European Championships.

In somewhat lesser events, she won the bronze medal at the 1991 Summer Universiade, bronze medal at the 1994 Goodwill Games, took the third place at the 1994 IAAF World Cup, and finished sixth at the 1998 IAAF World Cup and seventh at the 1998 European Championships. She became Soviet champion in 1991 and Russian champion in 1992, 1993, 1994 and 1998.

Her personal best time of 54.11 seconds, was achieved in July 1994 in Nice.

== International competitions ==
All results regarding 400 metres hurdles

Year	Competition	Venue	Position	Notes
Representing Soviet Union
1989	European Junior Championships	Varaždin, Yugoslavia	2nd	56.70
1991	Universiade	Sheffield, United Kingdom	3rd	56.74
1991	World Championships	Tokyo, Japan	13th (sf)	55.81
Representing Russia
1993	World Championships	Stuttgart, Germany	12th (sf)	55.12
1994	Goodwill Games	Saint Petersburg, Russia	3rd	54.67
1994	European Championships	Helsinki, Finland	3rd	54.68
1994	World Cup	London, United Kingdom	3rd	56.63
1996	Olympic Games	Atlanta, United States	19th (h)	56.21
1997	World Championships	Athens, Greece	12th (sf)	55.28
1998	European Championships	Budapest, Hungary	7th	55.47
1998	World Cup	Johannesburg, South Africa	6th	56.09
(#) Indicates overall position in qualifying heats (h) or semifinals (sf)

== See also ==
- List of World Athletics Championships medalists (women)
- List of European Athletics Championships medalists (women)
