= Vera Ordina =

Russian hurdler

Personal information
- Nationality: Soviet
- Born: 4 June 1968 (age 58)

Sport
- Sport: Track and field
- Event: 400 metres hurdles

Vera Ordina (born 4 June 1968) is a Russian former hurdler. She finished fifth in the final of the 400 metres hurdles at the 1992 Barcelona Olympics, representing the Unified Team.

== International competitions ==
Year	Competition	Venue	Position	Notes
Representing Soviet Union
1991	Grand Prix Final	Barcelona, Spain	8th	59.??
Representing Unified Team
1992	Olympic Games	Barcelona, Spain	5th	54.83
Representing Russia
1994	European Cup	Birmingham, United Kingdom	4th	56.13
1994	European Championships	Helsinki, Finland	12th (sf)	56.40
(#) Indicates overall position in semifinals
