= Tonja Buford-Bailey =

American hurdler (born 1970)

Personal information
- Full name: Tonja Yvette Buford-Bailey
- Born: December 13, 1970 (age 55) Dayton, Ohio, U.S.
Medal record
Women's athletics (track and field)
Representing United States
Olympic Games
Bronze medal – third place	1996 Atlanta	400 m hurdles
World Championships
Silver medal – second place	1995 Gothenburg	400 m hurdles

Tonja Yvette Buford-Bailey, née Buford, (December 13, 1970, in Dayton, Ohio) is an American former Olympian who competed mainly in the 400 meter hurdles. She competed as Tonja Buford until marrying Victor Bailey on October 28, 1995. In 1982, when she was 12 years old, she met former track runner Wilma Rudolph. She attended Meadowdale High School in Dayton and the University of Illinois.

Her best result came in the 1995 World Championships held in Gothenburg, Sweden where she won the silver medal in the 400-meter hurdles, losing to compatriot Kim Batten by only 0.01 seconds. With times of 52.61 and 52.62, both athletes went under Sally Gunnell's old world record of 52.74 from the previous edition of the World Championships. That time would remain Buford's personal best, and is still the ninth quickest of all time.

The following year, she competed for the United States in the 1996 Summer Olympics held in Atlanta, United States, where she won the bronze medal in the 400 meter hurdles behind Jamaica's Deon Hemmings and Batten.

She went on to have some further successes, only just missing out on a bronze medal at the 2001 World Championships and winning her event at the IAAF Grand Prix Final that year.

Buford-Bailey is the men and women's track and field Sprint and Relay coach at the University of Texas, Austin, beginning in June 2013. Buford-Bailey was the head women's track and field coach at the University of Illinois, Urbana-Champaign. She has two children and her husband is Victor Bailey, a former American football player.

== International competitions ==
All results regarding 400 metres hurdles.

Year	Competition	Venue	Position	Notes
Representing United States
1991	Pan American Games	Havana, Cuba	3rd	57.81
1992	Olympic Games	Barcelona, Spain	10th (sf)	55.04
1993	World Championships	Stuttgart, Germany	5th	54.55
1995	Pan American Games	Mar del Plata, Argentina	2nd	55.05
1995	World Championships	Gothenburg, Sweden	2nd	52.62
1995	Grand Prix Final	Fontvieille, Monaco	2nd	53.69
1996	Olympic Games	Atlanta, United States	3rd	53.22
1997	World Championships	Athens, Greece	6th	54.77
2000	Olympic Games	Sydney, Australia	18th (h)	57.02
2001	World Championships	Edmonton, Canada	4th	54.55
2001	Grand Prix Final	Melbourne, Australia	1st	54.58

(#) Indicates overall result in the qualifying heats (h) or semifinals (sf).
