= Rosey Edeh =

Canadian television personality

- Born: Rosaline Ugochukwu Edeh; August 16, 1966 (age 60); London, United Kingdom
- Education: Rice University (M.A.)
- Occupations: Journalist; Director; Producer
- Notable credit(s): CNN; Early Today; MSNBC; ET Canada; Global Toronto; The Morning Show
- Family: Daughter: Micha Powell

Rosey Edeh (born August 16, 1966) is a Canadian Olympic finalist and Commonwealth games medalist as a hurdler. In her subsequent television career, she was a news anchor for Global News at Noon at Global Toronto and the senior reporter for ET Canada. She is the CEO of Micha Muse Media and directed her debut film Oliver Jones: Mind Hands Heart. Currently she is a morning co-anchor for CTV Morning Live Ottawa.

== Biography ==
Edeh was born in London. She was a weather presenter providing weather forecasts on CFCF in Montreal, Quebec before moving to the United States to work for CNN and most recently as a weathercaster on NBC's Early Today and on MSNBC.

Her running skills led to an athletic scholarship at Rice University in Houston, where she established herself as a world-class 400-metre hurdler. Based on her 100-metre hurdle time she was considered one of the best athletes to attend Rice and was inducted into the Rice Hall of Fame. At the time of her induction she was ranked sixth in the world. She was a five time All America at the university. She lived in Lasalle, Quebec and competed at the Olympic Games in 1988, 1992, and 1996. Edeh won a bronze medal at the 1990 Commonwealth Games as a member of the 4 x 400 metre relay team; she was on the gold medal-winning 4 x 400 metre relay team, at the 1992 World Cup of Track and Field in Havana, Cuba.

In the 400-metre hurdles final at the 1996 Summer Olympics Edeh set a Canadian national record time that stood over 23 years, until broken by Sage Watson in 2019.

In July 2016 her daughter Micha Powell was named to Canada's Olympic team as an alternate.

In September 2020, Rosey became a co-anchor of the CTV Morning News Live Ottawa.
