= Heike Meißner =

German athlete

Personal information
- Full name: Brigitte Heike Meißner
- Born: 29 January 1970 (age 56) Dresden, East Germany
Medal record
Women's athletics
Representing Germany
World Indoor Championships
Bronze medal – third place	1997 Paris	4 × 400 m relay
European Championships
Silver medal – second place	2002 Munich	400 m hurdles
Bronze medal – third place	1994 Helsinki	4 × 400 m relay
Summer Universiade
Gold medal – first place	1993 Buffalo	400 m hurdles
Gold medal – first place	1995 Fukuoka	400 m hurdles

Brigitte Heike Meissner (German: Meißner, born 29 January 1970) is a retired German athlete. She competed mainly in the 400 metres hurdles, but also spent two seasons specializing in the 800 metres. Notable achievements include a silver medal at the 2002 European Championships, medals in 4 × 400 metres relay at the 1994 European Championships and the 1997 World Indoor Championships and a fourth place at the 1995 World Championships.

She won the 400 metres hurdles bronze medal at the 1989 European Junior Championships. She also helped win the 4 × 400 m relay with the East German team.

Her first World Championships participation came in 1991. Here, she finished seventh in the 400 m hurdles. At her first Olympic Games in 1992 she only reached the semi-final of the 400 m hurdles competition, but finished sixth in the 4 × 400 m relay with teammates Uta Rohländer, Linda Kisabaka and Anja Rücker. At the 1993 World Championships Meißner finished third in her semi-final heat, but this was not enough to reach the final round. Instead she competed once more on the 4 × 400 m relay team, finishing fifth with Sandra Seuser, Anja Rucker and Linda Kisabaka. The same year, however, Meißner competed at the 1993 Summer Universiade and won a gold medal in the 400 m hurdles. She beat Debbie-Ann Parris of Jamaica with a margin of only 0.01 seconds.

In 1994 Meissner competed at the European Championships. She finished fourth in the individual distance, 0.11 seconds behind Russian Anna Knoroz who won the bronze medal. In the 4 × 400 m relay she won her first medal at a major international competition, finishing third with teammates Karin Janke, Uta Rohländer and Anja Rücker. The next year she repeated her achievements from the previous years. She once again finished fourth at a major competition, this time at the 1995 World Championships. She also won the 1995 Summer Universiade, this time with a comfortable margin.

The next Olympic Games were held in 1996 in Atlanta. She finished sixth in 400 m hurdles, as the best European athlete. Unlike the 1993 Universiade, she finished 0.06 seconds behind fourth-placed Debbie-Ann Parris. The medalists ran in the range of 52.8-53.2 seconds, whereas Meissner ran in a career best time of 54.03 seconds. This result ranks her fourth among German 400 m hurdlers through all time, behind Sabine Busch, Cornelia Ullrich and Ellen Fiedler. Her success continued at the 1997 World Indoor Championships, where she won a bronze medal in the relay, this time with Anja Rücker, Anke Feller and Grit Breuer. Meißner ran the third leg. She did not compete in any individual distance as the 400 metres hurdles is not contested during the indoor season.

However, the next season she competed internationally in the 800 metres. She finished sixth at the 1998 European Championships, and as the best German she was selected to represent her country at the 1998 World Cup event in Johannesburg. She placed seventh with the mediocre time of 2:04.50 minutes. At the Weltklasse Zürich meet in August she had run the 800 metres in 1:59.50 minutes; this was her career best time. She did not give priority to the hurdles in 1998, with 56.05 seconds as her season's best time.

She decided to continue specializing in the 800 metres in 1999, but fared worse in both events with season's best times of 2:00.76 minutes and 56.29 seconds respectively. She then reverted to the hurdles. She was soon back in the 54-second range, running in 54.84 seconds in July 2000. Third qualified her for the 2000 Olympic Games, but she only reached the semi-final there. In 2002, however, she returned to the medal podium as she won the silver medal at the 2002 European Championships with a time of 55.89 seconds. As in 1998, this achievement qualified her to represent Germany at the 2002 World Cup, where she finished seventh. The same year she ran the distance of 400 metres without hurdles at the ISTAF meet in Berlin, finishing in 53.19 seconds. This equalled the personal best mark she had achieved during the 2001 indoor season.

The main goal for the 2003 season was the 2003 World Championships in Paris. She ran a season's best time of 55.00 seconds in the heats, but did not repeat this in the final round and finished seventh with 55.60 seconds. She retired from professional athletics following this season.

Meissner represented the sports clubs SC Einheit Dresden, Dresdner SC, SC Magdeburg and LAC Erdgas Chemnitz during her active career. In the 400 metres hurdles she became East German champion in 1990 and German champion in 1991, 1992, 1994, 1995, 2001 and 2002. In addition she became German indoor champion in the 400 metres in 1994 and in the 800 metres in 1995, 1997 and 1998.

Meissner is 1.72 metres tall; during her active career she weighed 55 kilograms.
