= Tetyana Tereshchuk-Antipova =

Ukrainian hurdler

Personal information
- Born: Tetyana Tereshchuk; 11 October 1969 (age 57) Luhansk, Ukrainian SSR, Soviet Union
Medal record
Women's athletics
Representing Ukraine
Olympic Games
Bronze medal – third place	2004 Athens	400 m hurdles
European Championships
Silver medal – second place	1998 Budapest	400 m hurdles
Bronze medal – third place	2006 Gothenburg	400 m hurdles
IAAF World Athletics Final
Silver medal – second place	2004 Monaco	400 m hurdles
Bronze medal – third place	2006 Stuttgart	400 m hurdles
European Cup
Gold medal – first place	1998 Saint Petersburg	400 m hurdles
Gold medal – first place	2000 Gateshead	400 m hurdles
Silver medal – second place	1994 Birmingham	400 m hurdles
Bronze medal – third place	1995 Villeneuve d'Ascq	400 m hurdles
Bronze medal – third place	2006 Málaga	400 m hurdles
Goodwill Games
Gold medal – first place	2001 Brisbane	400 m hurdles
Summer Universiade
Gold medal – first place	1997 Catania	400 m hurdles
IAAF Grand Prix Final
Silver medal – second place	2001 Melbourne	400 m hurdles
Bronze medal – third place	1997 Fukuoka	400 m hurdles

Tetyana Tereshchuk-Antipova (née Tereshchuk, Ukrainian: Тетяна Терещук-Антипова, born 11 October 1969), also spelled Tetiana Tereschuk-Antipova, is a female Ukrainian 400 m hurdler. She was born in Luhansk.

She won bronze at the 2004 Olympic Games, silver at the 1998 European Championships and bronze at the 2006 European Championships.

== International competitions ==
All results regarding 400 metres hurdles

Year	Competition	Venue	Position	Notes
Representing Ukraine
1994	European Championships	Helsinki, Finland	6th	55.53
1995	World Championships	Gothenburg, Sweden	5th	54.94
1996	Olympic Games	Atlanta, United States	14th (sf)	55.34
1997	Universiade	Catania, Italy	1st	54.91
1997	World Championships	Athens, Greece	4th	53.81
1998	European Championships	Budapest, Hungary	2nd	54.07
1999	World Championships	Seville, Spain	7th	54.33
2000	Olympic Games	Sydney, Australia	5th	53.98
2003	World Championships	Paris, France	5th	54.61
2004	Olympic Games	Athens, Greece	3rd	53.44
2005	World Championships	Helsinki, Finland	7th	55.09
2006	European Championships	Gothenburg, Sweden	3rd	54.55
2006	World Cup	Athens, Greece	4th	54.55
2007	World Championships	Osaka, Japan	9th (sf)	54.38
(sf) = Indicates overall position in semifinal round
