= Deon Hemmings =

Jamaican hurdler (born 1968)

Deon Hemmings CD
Personal information
- Full name: Deon Marie Hemmings
- Born: 9 October 1968 (age 57) Saint Ann, Jamaica
Medal record
Women's athletics
Representing Jamaica
Olympic Games
Gold medal – first place	1996 Atlanta	400 m hurdles
Silver medal – second place	2000 Sydney	400 m hurdles
Silver medal – second place	2000 Sydney	4 × 400 m relay
World Championships
Gold medal – first place	2001 Edmonton	4 × 400 m relay
Silver medal – second place	1997 Athens	400 m hurdles
Bronze medal – third place	1995 Gothenburg	400 m hurdles
Bronze medal – third place	1997 Athens	4 × 400 m relay
Bronze medal – third place	1999 Seville	400 m hurdles
World Indoor Championships
Gold medal – first place	1993 Toronto	4 × 400 m relay
Commonwealth Games
Silver medal – second place	1994 Victoria	400 m hurdles
Central American and Caribbean Games
Gold medal – first place	1998 Maracaibo	400 m hurdles

Deon Marie Hemmings (born 9 October 1968 in Saint Ann, Jamaica) is a former female 400 metres hurdler.

Hemmings was the first ever Jamaican woman to win an Olympic Gold when she won the 400 m Hurdles at the 1996 Olympics, breaking the Olympic record, which stood to 2004. Hemmings also won two silver medals at the 2000 Olympics in the 400 m Hurdles and 4 × 400 m Relay (together with Sandie Richards, Catherine Scott-Pomales and Lorraine Graham).

Hemmings also won a silver medal in the 1994 Commonwealth Games, a bronze medal in the 1995 World Athletics Championships, a Silver in the 1997 World Athletics Championships, and a Bronze in the 1999 World Athletics Championships, all in the 400 m Hurdles.

Hemmings retired in 2003 and married Michael McCatty in 2004.

Sporting positions
Preceded by (United States) Kim Batten	Women's 400 m Hurdles Best Year Performance; 1996	Succeeded by (United States) Kim Batten (Morocco) Nezha Bidouane
Olympic Games
Preceded by Ricky McIntosh	Flag bearer for Jamaica; Sydney 2000	Succeeded by Winston Watts
