= Kim Batten =

American hurdler (born 1969)

Personal information
- Born: March 29, 1969 (age 57) McRae, Georgia, U.S.
Medal record
Women's athletics (track and field)
Representing the United States
Olympic Games
Silver medal – second place	1996 Atlanta	400 m hurdles
World Championships
Gold medal – first place	1995 Gothenburg	400 m hurdles
Silver medal – second place	1997 Athens	4 × 400 m relay
Bronze medal – third place	1997 Athens	400 m hurdles
Pan American Games
Gold medal – first place	1995 Mar del Plata	400 m hurdles

Kim Batten (born March 29, 1969, in McRae, Georgia) is an American former 400 meter hurdles champion. She was the 1995 world record holder in the women's 400-meter hurdles.

She played basketball at East High School in Rochester, New York. Batten graduated from the Florida State University in 1991, the same year she won her first national championship – the U.S. National Championships, the first of six national championships (1991, 1994, 1995, 1996, 1997, 1998).

Batten is 5 feet 7 inches (1.70 m) tall.

Batten's finest year came in 1995, when she won Gold in the World Athletics Championships breaking the World Record for the 400 m Hurdles in a time of 52.61 seconds. Batten also came first in the Pan American Games and first in the national indoor championships.

In 1996 she won silver in the 1996 Olympic Games and in 1997 won bronze in the World Athletics Championships. She was also a member of the 2000 US Olympic track team.

In 1999 an injury to a nerve in her foot caused her to miss most of the season. Batten retired at the end of the 2001 season.

Batten currently resides at Atlanta, GA. She was inducted into the National Track and Field Hall of Fame in 2012.

== Records ==
- 1991 US Outdoor Champion
- 1994 US Outdoor Champion
- 1995 US Outdoor Champion
- 1995 World Champion at Gothenburg, Sweden
- 1996 Olympic silver medal at Atlanta, Georgia
- 1996 US Outdoor Champion
- 1997 US Outdoor Champion
- 1997 World bronze medal at Athens, Greece
- 1998 World Cup bronze medal
- 1998 US Outdoor Champion

Awards
Preceded by (United States) Gwen Torrence	Women's Track & Field ESPY Award; 1996	Succeeded by (France) Marie-José Pérec
Sporting positions
Preceded by (United Kingdom) Sally Gunnell	Women's 400 m Hurdles Best Year Performance; 1995; 1997 — 1998	Succeeded by (Jamaica) Deon Hemmings
Preceded by (Jamaica) Deon Hemmings	Women's 400 m Hurdles Best Year Performance; 1995; 1997 — 1998	Succeeded by (Cuba) Daimí Pernía
