= Athletics at the 1990 Commonwealth Games – Women's 400 metres =

Women's 400 metres at the Commonwealth Games

The women's 400 metres event at the 1990 Commonwealth Games was held on 27 and 28 January at the Mount Smart Stadium in Auckland.

== Medalists ==
Gold	Silver	Bronze
Fatima Yusuf; Nigeria	Linda Keough; England	Charity Opara; Nigeria

== Results ==
=== Heats ===
Qualification: First 4 of each heat (Q) and the next 1 fastest (q) qualified for the final.

Rank	Heat	Name	Nationality	Time	Notes
1	2	Charity Opara	Nigeria	51.12	Q, AR
2	1	Fatima Yusuf	Nigeria	51.69	Q
3	2	Jenni Stoute	England	52.39	Q
4	1	Linda Keough	England	52.76	Q
5	2	Mercy Addy	Ghana	52.77	Q
6	2	Maree Holland	Australia	53.28	Q
7	1	Angela Piggford	England	53.72	Q
8	2	Gail Harris	Canada	53.88	q
9	1	Cheryl Allen	Canada	54.74	Q
10	1	Susan Andrews	Australia	54.77	
11	1	Josephine Mary Singarayar	Malaysia	55.85	
12	1	Jill Cockram	New Zealand	56.39	
	2	Andrea Wade	New Zealand	DNF	

=== Final ===
Rank	Lane	Name	Nationality	Time	Notes
1st place, gold medalist(s)	3	Fatima Yusuf	Nigeria	51.08	AR
2nd place, silver medalist(s)	6	Linda Keough	England	51.63	
3rd place, bronze medalist(s)	5	Charity Opara	Nigeria	52.01	
4	2	Maree Holland	Australia	52.68	
5	4	Jenni Stoute	England	53.44	
6	9	Angela Piggford	England	53.45	
7	8	Gail Harris	Canada	54.24	
8	1	Cheryl Allen	Canada	54.36	
9	7	Mercy Addy	Ghana	57.01	
