= 1999 IAAF World Indoor Championships – Women's 400 metres =

The women's 400 metres event at the 1999 IAAF World Indoor Championships was held on March 5–7.

== Medalists ==
| Gold | Silver | Bronze |
|---|---|---|
| Grit Breuer; Germany | Falilat Ogunkoya; Nigeria | Jearl Miles Clark; United States |

== Results ==
=== Heats ===
First 2 of each heat (Q) and next 4 fastest (q) qualified for the semifinals.

| Rank | Heat | Name | Nationality | Time | Notes |
|---|---|---|---|---|---|
| 1 | 1 | Grit Breuer | Germany | 51.13 | Q |
| 2 | 1 | Natalya Nazarova | Russia | 51.51 | Q |
| 3 | 2 | Jearl Miles Clark | United States | 51.79 | Q, SB |
| 4 | 1 | Ester Goossens | Netherlands | 52.05 | q, SB |
| 5 | 4 | Olga Kotlyarova | Russia | 52.06 | Q |
| 6 | 2 | Deon Hemmings | Jamaica | 52.10 | Q |
| 7 | 2 | Charity Opara | Nigeria | 52.11 | q, SB |
| 8 | 3 | Sandie Richards | Jamaica | 52.40 | Q |
| 9 | 4 | Ana Guevara | Mexico | 52.43 | Q |
| 10 | 1 | Virna de Angeli | Italy | 52.50 | q, SB |
| 11 | 1 | Alina Rîpanu | Romania | 52.64 | q, PB |
| 11 | 3 | Falilat Ogunkoya | Nigeria | 52.64 | Q |
| 13 | 3 | Susan Andrews | Australia | 52.65 | |
| 14 | 3 | Shanelle Porter | United States | 52.65 | |
| 15 | 4 | Sinead Dudgeon | Great Britain | 52.84 | PB |
| 16 | 2 | Sakie Nobuoka | Japan | 54.11 | |
| 17 | 2 | Kaltouma Nadjina | Chad | 54.30 | NR |
| 18 | 4 | Tonique Williams | Bahamas | 54.65 | |
| 19 | 4 | Chen Yuxiang | China | 55.14 | |
| | 2 | Helena Dziurova-Fuchsová | Czech Republic | DNS | |
| | 3 | Amy Mbacké Thiam | Senegal | DNS | |
| | 4 | Ameerah Bello | United States Virgin Islands | DNS | |

=== Semifinals ===
First 2 of each semifinal (Q) and the next 2 fastest (q) qualified for the final.

| Rank | Heat | Name | Nationality | Time | Notes |
|---|---|---|---|---|---|
| 1 | 2 | Jearl Miles Clark | United States | 50.83 | Q, WL |
| 2 | 1 | Grit Breuer | Germany | 50.88 | Q, WL |
| 3 | 2 | Ana Guevara | Mexico | 50.93 | Q, NR |
| 4 | 1 | Falilat Ogunkoya | Nigeria | 51.44 | Q, PB |
| 5 | 2 | Deon Hemmings | Jamaica | 51.47 | q, PB |
| 6 | 1 | Sandie Richards | Jamaica | 51.54 | q, SB |
| 7 | 2 | Olga Kotlyarova | Russia | 51.69 | |
| 8 | 1 | Ester Goossens | Netherlands | 52.09 | |
| 9 | 2 | Charity Opara | Nigeria | 52.31 | |
| 10 | 2 | Virna de Angeli | Italy | 52.95 | |
| 11 | 1 | Alina Rîpanu | Romania | 53.29 | |
| | 1 | Natalya Nazarova | Russia | DNF | |

=== Final ===
| Rank | Name | Nationality | Time | Notes |
|---|---|---|---|---|
| 1st place, gold medalist(s) | Grit Breuer | Germany | 50.80 | WL |
| 2nd place, silver medalist(s) | Falilat Ogunkoya | Nigeria | 51.25 | PB |
| 3rd place, bronze medalist(s) | Jearl Miles Clark | United States | 51.45 | |
| 4 | Ana Guevara | Mexico | 51.55 | |
| 5 | Sandie Richards | Jamaica | 51.75 | |
| 6 | Deon Hemmings | Jamaica | 52.04 | |
