= 1988 World Junior Championships in Athletics – Women's 4 × 400 metres relay =

The women's 4x400 metres relay event at the 1988 World Junior Championships in Athletics was held in Sudbury, Ontario, Canada, at Laurentian University Stadium on 30 and 31 July.

== Medalists ==
Gold	Manuela Derr; Stefanie Fabert; Anke Wöhlk; Grit Breuer; East Germany
Silver	Keisha Demas; Stephanie Saleem; Kendra Mackey; Teri Smith; United States
Bronze	Tatyana Movchan; Viktoria Miloserdova; Olga Burkanova; Olga Moroz; Soviet Union

== Results ==
=== Final ===
31 July

Rank	Nation	Competitors	Time	Notes
1st place, gold medalist(s)	East Germany	Manuela Derr; Stefanie Fabert; Anke Wöhlk; Grit Breuer	3:28.39	
2nd place, silver medalist(s)	United States	Keisha Demas; Stephanie Saleem; Kendra Mackey; Teri Smith	3:31.48	
3rd place, bronze medalist(s)	Soviet Union	Tatyana Movchan; Viktoria Miloserdova; Olga Burkanova; Olga Moroz	3:31.89	
4	Canada	Caroline Fortin; Senzeni Steingruber; Karen Layne; Cheryl Allen	3:36.41	
5	Yugoslavia	Marina Filipović; Marjana Lužar; Slavica Živković; Suzana Belac	3:37.52	
6	Romania	Aura Cracea; Catalina Gheorghiu; Luminita Avasiloaie; Daniela Plescan	3:38.18	
7	Spain	María Díez; Gemma Bergasa; Isabel Rodríguez; Julia Merino	3:38.94	
8	France	Catherine Chanfreau; Patricia Djaté; Valérie Jaunâtre; Elsa Devassoigne	3:39.07	

=== Heats ===
30 July

==== Heat 1 ====
Rank	Nation	Competitors	Time	Notes
1	East Germany	Antje Axmann; Daniele Steinecke; Stefanie Fabert; Anke Wöhlk	3:37.64	Q
2	Canada	Caroline Fortin; Kristen Lundgren; Karen Layne; Cheryl Allen	3:38.06	Q
3	France	Catherine Chanfreau; Patricia Djaté; Valérie Jaunâtre; Elsa Devassoigne	3:40.69	q
4	Spain	María Díez; Gemma Bergasa; Isabel Rodríguez; Julia Merino	3:41.22	q
5	United Kingdom	Tracy Allen; Paula Fryer; Tracy Goddard; Emma Langston	3:42.36	
6	New Zealand	Anna Shattky; Vanessa Jack; Tania Murray; Sonia Barry	4:02.57	

==== Heat 2 ====
Rank	Nation	Competitors	Time	Notes
1	United States	Keisha Demas; Stephanie Saleem; Frenchie Holmes; Teri Smith	3:39.21	Q
2	Romania	Aura Cracea; Catalina Gheorghiu; Luminita Avasiloaie; Daniela Plescan	3:39.56	Q
3	Cuba	Mayelin Lemus; Lency Montelier; Marlen Estévez; Nancy McLeón	3:43.18	
4	Australia	Amanda Christie; Sue Andrews; Adrienne Rainbird; Annette Cavanagh	3:47.58	
5	Hungary	Zsofia Antok; Katalin Fogarassy; Erzsebet Todorán; Kinga Fodor	3:48.71	
	Italy	Rossana Morabito; Loredana Fontana; Chiara Dalla Giovanna; Monica De Col	DQ	

==== Heat 3 ====
Rank	Nation	Competitors	Time	Notes
1	Soviet Union	Viktoria Miloserdova; Tatyana Movchan; Olga Burkanova; Olga Moroz	3:37.88	Q
2	Yugoslavia	Marina Filipović; Marjana Lužar; Slavica Živković; Suzana Belac	3:39.93	Q
3	China	Li Shuxiang; Li Liang; Wang Ping; Li Guilian	3:43.27	
4	Netherlands	Michelle Martinot; Ineke de Jong; Ester Goossens; Monique Steennis	3:45.30	
5	West Germany	Linda Kisabaka; Ruth Scheppan; Sonja Macher; Amona-Nicola Schneeweis	3:55.49	
	Bulgaria	Katerina Krasteva; Daniela Spasova; Julieta Kondova; Sofia Sabeva	DQ	

== Participation ==
According to an unofficial count, 76 athletes from 18 countries participated in the event.

- Australia (4)
- Bulgaria (4)
- Canada (5)
- China (4)
- Cuba (4)
- East Germany (6)
- France (4)
- Hungary (4)
- Italy (4)
- Netherlands (4)
- New Zealand (4)
- Romania (4)
- Soviet Union (4)
- Spain (4)
- United Kingdom (4)
- United States (5)
- West Germany (4)
- Yugoslavia (4)
