= 2000 European Athletics Indoor Championships – Women's 400 metres =

The women's 400 metres event at the 2000 European Athletics Indoor Championships was held on February 25–27.

== Medalists ==
Gold	Silver	Bronze
Svetlana Pospelova; Russia	Natalya Nazarova; Russia	Helena Fuchsová; Czech Republic

== Results ==
=== Heats ===
First 3 of each heat (Q) and the next 3 fastest (q) qualified for the semifinals.

Rank	Heat	Name	Nationality	Time	Notes
1	3	Svetlana Pospelova	Russia	51.84	Q, PB
2	1	Natalya Nazarova	Russia	52.07	Q
3	3	Anja Rücker	Germany	52.39	Q
4	1	Daniela Georgieva	Bulgaria	52.67	Q
5	1	Claudia Marx	Germany	52.76	Q
6	2	Helena Fuchsová	Czech Republic	52.88	Q
7	2	Irina Rosikhina	Russia	52.97	Q
8	3	Jitka Burianová	Czech Republic	53.10	Q
9	2	Karen Shinkins	Ireland	53.20	Q
10	1	Virna De Angeli	Italy	53.30	q
11	1	Otilia Ruicu	Romania	53.40	q, PB
12	3	Gudrun Arnardóttir	Iceland	53.60	q, SB
13	2	Žana Minina	Lithuania	53.82	
14	2	Francesca Carbone	Italy	53.86	
14	3	Marie-Louise Bévis	France	53.86	
16	2	Georgeta Lazar	Romania	54.49	
17	3	Andrea Burlacu	Romania	55.20	

=== Semifinals ===
First 3 of each semifinals qualified directly (Q) for the final.

Rank	Heat	Name	Nationality	Time	Notes
1	1	Natalya Nazarova	Russia	51.79	Q
2	2	Svetlana Pospelova	Russia	52.24	Q
3	2	Daniela Georgieva	Bulgaria	52.32	Q
4	1	Helena Fuchsová	Czech Republic	52.45	Q
5	1	Claudia Marx	Germany	52.65	Q
6	2	Karen Shinkins	Ireland	52.80	Q, NR
7	2	Jitka Burianová	Czech Republic	52.96	
8	1	Irina Rosikhina	Russia	53.05	
9	2	Gudrun Arnardóttir	Iceland	53.14	
10	1	Virna De Angeli	Italy	53.37	
11	1	Otilia Ruicu	Romania	53.44	
	2	Anja Rücker	Germany	DNF	

=== Final ===
Rank	Name	Nationality	Time	Notes
1st place, gold medalist(s)	Svetlana Pospelova	Russia	51.66	PB
2nd place, silver medalist(s)	Natalya Nazarova	Russia	51.69	
3rd place, bronze medalist(s)	Helena Fuchsová	Czech Republic	52.32	
4	Karen Shinkins	Ireland	53.15	
	Daniela Georgieva	Bulgaria	DQ	
	Claudia Marx	Germany	DNF	
