= Athletics at the 1986 Commonwealth Games – Women's 4 × 400 metres relay =

Women's 4 × 400 metres relay at the Commonwealth Games

The women's 4 × 400 metres relay event at the 1986 Commonwealth Games was held on 2 August at the Meadowbank Stadium in Edinburgh.

== Results ==
Rank	Nation	Athletes	Time	Notes
1st place, gold medalist(s)	Canada	Charmaine Crooks, Marita Payne, Molly Killingbeck, Jillian Richardson	3:28.92	
2nd place, silver medalist(s)	England	Jane Parry, Linda Keough, Angela Piggford, Kathy Cook	3:32.82	
3rd place, bronze medalist(s)	Australia	Maree Chapman, Sharon Stewart, Julie Schwass, Debbie Flintoff	3:32.86	
4	Scotland	Sandra Whittaker, Anne Purvis, Dawn Kitchen, Fiona Hargreaves	3:42.86	
