= 1997 World Championships in Athletics – Women's 4 × 400 metres relay =

These are the results of the Women's 4 × 400 metres relay event at the 1997 World Championships in Athletics in Athens, Greece.

== Medalists ==
Gold	Silver	Bronze
Germany; Anke Feller; Uta Rohländer; Anja Rücker; Grit Breuer	United States; Maicel Malone-Wallace; Kim Graham; Kim Batten; Jearl Miles Clark; Michele Collins*; Natasha Kaiser-Brown*	Jamaica; Inez Turner; Lorraine Graham; Deon Hemmings; Sandie Richards; Nadia Graham-Hutchinson*

* Runners who participated in the heats only and received medals.

== Results ==
=== Heats ===
Qualification: First 3 of each heat (Q) plus the 2 fastest times (q) advance to the final.

Rank	Heat	Nation	Athletes	Time	Notes
1	1	Germany	Anke Feller, Uta Rohländer, Anja Rücker, Grit Breuer	3:24.70	Q, SB
2	1	Czech Republic	Naděžda Koštovalová, Hana Benešová, Ludmila Formanová, Helena Dziurova-Fuchsová	3:25.11	Q
3	2	United States	Michele Collins, Kim Graham, Natasha Kaiser-Brown, Maicel Malone-Wallace	3:25.37	Q, SB
4	2	Jamaica	Nadia Graham-Hutchinson, Lorraine Graham, Inez Turner, Sandie Richards	3:25.53	Q, SB
5	1	Great Britain	Allison Curbishley, Michelle Pierre, Michelle Thomas, Donna Fraser	3:25.78	Q
6	2	Russia	Tatyana Chebykina, Yuliya Tarasenko, Yekaterina Kulikova, Olga Kotlyarova	3:25.83	Q
7	1	Nigeria	Doris Jacob, Olabisi Afolabi, Saidat Onanuga, Falilat Ogunkoya	3:27.94	q
8	2	Italy	Danielle Perpoli, Patrizia Spuri, Francesca Carbone, Virna De Angeli	3:30.34	q
9	1	Hungary	Annamária Bori, Barbara Petráhn, Alice Kun, Judit Szekeres	3:35.56	
10	2	Greece	Chrysoula Goudenoudi, Maria Pachatouridou, Christina Panagou, Marina Vasarmidou	3:37.14	

=== Final ===
Rank	Nation	Athletes	Time	Notes
1st place, gold medalist(s)	Germany	Anke Feller, Uta Rohländer, Anja Rücker, Grit Breuer	3:20.92	WL
2nd place, silver medalist(s)	United States	Maicel Malone-Wallace, Kim Graham, Kim Batten, Jearl Miles Clark	3:21.03	SB
3rd place, bronze medalist(s)	Jamaica	Inez Turner, Lorraine Graham, Deon Hemmings, Sandie Richards	3:21.30	NR
4	Russia	Tatyana Chebykina, Olga Kotlyarova, Yekaterina Kulikova, Tatyana Alekseyeva	3:21.57	SB
5	Czech Republic	Naděžda Koštovalová, Ludmila Formanová, Hana Benešová, Helena Dziurova-Fuchsová	3:23.73	
6	Great Britain	Allison Curbishley, Michelle Pierre, Michelle Thomas, Donna Fraser	3:26.27	
7	Nigeria	Olabisi Afolabi, Fatima Yusuf, Doris Jacob, Falilat Ogunkoya	3:30.04	
8	Italy	Patrizia Spuri, Francesca Carbone, Carla Barbarino, Virna De Angeli	3:30.63	
