= Athletics at the 1990 Commonwealth Games – Women's 800 metres =

Women's 800 metres at the Commonwealth Games

The women's 800 metres event at the 1990 Commonwealth Games was held on 29 January and 1 February at the Mount Smart Stadium in Auckland.

== Medalists ==
Gold	Silver	Bronze
Diane Edwards; England	Ann Williams; England	Sharon Stewart; Australia

== Results ==
=== Heats ===
Qualification: First 4 of each heat (Q) and the next 1 fastest (q) qualified for the final.

Rank	Heat	Name	Nationality	Time	Notes
1	2	Wendy Old	Australia	2:03.19	Q
2	2	Gail Luke	Australia	2:03.73	Q
3	2	Diane Edwards	England	2:04.86	Q
4	1	Sharon Stewart	Australia	2:05.46	Q
5	1	Lorraine Baker	England	2:05.80	Q
6	2	Toni Hodgkinson	New Zealand	2:05.86	Q
7	1	Nicky Knapp	Canada	2:06.11	Q
8	2	Brit Lind-Peterson	Canada	2:06.17	q
9	1	Ann Williams	England	2:06.22	Q
10	1	Carlene Dillimore	New Zealand	2:06.88	
11	1	Ranza Clark	Canada	2:07.73	
12	2	Marcia Tate	Jamaica	2:09.15	
13	1	Sheila Seebaluck	Mauritius	2:13.69	

=== Final ===
Rank	Name	Nationality	Time	Notes
1st place, gold medalist(s)	Diane Edwards	England	2:00.25	GR
2nd place, silver medalist(s)	Ann Williams	England	2:00.40	
3rd place, bronze medalist(s)	Sharon Stewart	Australia	2:00.87	
4	Wendy Old	Australia	2:01.70	
5	Lorraine Baker	England	2:01.77	
6	Gail Luke	Australia	2:02.71	
7	Nicky Knapp	Canada	2:03.79	
8	Brit Lind-Peterson	Canada	2:07.40	
9	Toni Hodgkinson	New Zealand	2:09.11	
