= Athletics at the 1990 Commonwealth Games – Women's 4 × 400 metres relay =

Women's 4 × 400 metres relay at the Commonwealth Games

The women's 4 × 400 metres relay event at the 1990 Commonwealth Games was held on 3 February at the Mount Smart Stadium in Auckland.

== Results ==
Rank	Nation	Athletes	Time	Notes
1st place, gold medalist(s)	England	Angela Piggford, Jenni Stoute, Sally Gunnell, Linda Keough	3:28.08	
2nd place, silver medalist(s)	Australia	Maree Holland, Sharon Stewart, Susan Andrews, Debbie Flintoff-King	3:30.74	
3rd place, bronze medalist(s)	Canada	Rosey Edeh, France Gareau, Cheryl Allen, Gail Harris	3:33.26	
4	New Zealand	Jayne Moffitt, Jill Cockram, Toni Hodgkinson, Carlene Dillimore	3:39.64	
