= 1990 European Athletics Championships – Women's 4 × 400 metres relay =

Women's 4 × 400 metres relay at the European Athletics Championships

These are the official results of the Women's 4 × 400 metres event at the 1990 European Championships in Split, Yugoslavia, held at Stadion Poljud on 31 August and 1 September 1990.

== Medalists ==
Gold	Manuela Derr; Annette Hesselbarth; Petra Schersing; Grit Breuer; East Germany
Silver	Yelena Vinogradova; Lyudmila Dzhigalova; Yelena Ruzina; Tatyana Ledovskaya; Soviet Union
Bronze	Sally Gunnell; Jennifer Stoute; Patricia Beckford; Linda Keough; United Kingdom

== Results ==
=== Final ===
1 September

Rank	Nation	Competitors	Time	Notes
1st place, gold medalist(s)	East Germany	Manuela Derr; Annette Hesselbarth; Petra Schersing; Grit Breuer	3:21.02	
2nd place, silver medalist(s)	Soviet Union	Yelena Vinogradova; Lyudmila Dzhigalova; Yelena Ruzina; Tatyana Ledovskaya	3:23.34	
3rd place, bronze medalist(s)	United Kingdom	Sally Gunnell; Jennifer Stoute; Patricia Beckford; Linda Keough	3:24.78	
4	West Germany	Karin Janke; Andrea Thomas; Helga Arendt; Silke Knoll	3:25.12	
5	France	Fabienne Ficher; Viviane Dorsile; Evelyne Elien; Marie-José Pérec	3:25.16	
6	Switzerland	Regula Anliker; Martha Grossenbacher; Regula Scalabrin; Anita Protti	3:29.94	
7	Hungary	Edit Molnár; Erzsébet Szabó; Noémi Bátori; Judit Forgács	3:32.30	
8	Finland	Anna Suurnäkki; Tuija Helander; Satu Jääskelainen; Sonja Finell	3:32.84	

=== Heats ===
31 August

==== Heat 1 ====
Rank	Nation	Competitors	Time	Notes
1	Soviet Union	Yelena Vinogradova; Marina Shmonina; Yelena Ruzina; Lyudmila Dzhigalova	3:26.14	Q
2	France	Fabienne Ficher; Viviane Dorsile; Evelyne Elien; Marie-José Pérec	3:28.49	Q
3	Hungary	Edit Molnár; Erzsébet Szabó; Noémi Bátori; Judit Forgács	3:30.41	Q
4	Spain	Gemma Bergasa; Julia Merino; Blanca Lacambra; Esther Lahoz	3:31.76	
	Portugal		DNS	
	Yugoslavia		DNS	

==== Heat 2 ====
Rank	Nation	Competitors	Time	Notes
1	East Germany	Manuela Derr; Annette Hesselbarth; Petra Schersing; Grit Breuer	3:28.22	Q
2	West Germany	Helga Arendt; Gabi Lesch; Karin Janke; Silke Knoll	3:28.33	Q
3	United Kingdom	Angela Piggford; Jennifer Stoute; Patricia Beckford; Linda Keough	3:28.73	Q
4	Switzerland	Regula Anliker; Martha Grossenbacher; Regula Scalabrin; Anita Protti	3:30.19	q
5	Finland	Anna Suurnäkki; Tuija Helander; Satu Jääskelainen; Sonja Finell	3:31.42	q
6	Sweden	Monika Klebe; Ewa Johansson; Maria Akraka; Monica Rydén	3:33.89	
7	Romania	Nicoleta Căruţaşu; Aurica Mitrea; Tudorița Chidu; Ella Kovacs	3:52.34	

== Participation ==
According to an unofficial count, 47 athletes from 11 countries participated in the event.

- East Germany (4)
- Finland (4)
- France (4)
- Hungary (4)
- Romania (4)
- Soviet Union (5)
- Spain (4)
- Sweden (4)
- Switzerland (4)
- United Kingdom (5)
- West Germany (5)

== See also ==
- 1988 Women's Olympic 4 × 400 m Relay (Seoul)
- 1991 Women's World Championships 4 × 400 m Relay (Tokyo)
- 1992 Women's Olympic 4 × 400 m Relay (Barcelona)
- 1993 Women's World Championships 4 × 400 m Relay (Stuttgart)
