= Pat Beckford =

English sprinter (born 1965)

Personal information
- Nationality: British (English)
- Born: 6 August 1965 (age 60) Wolverhampton, England
- Height: 178 cm (5 ft 10 in)
- Weight: 70 kg (154 lb)

Sport
- Sport: Athletics
- Event(s): 200m, 400m
- Club: Wolverhampton & Bilston Athletics Club
Medal record
Women's athletics
Representing Great Britain
European Championships
Bronze medal – third place	1990 Split	4×400 m

Patricia J. Beckford (born 6 August 1965) is an English former sprinter. She represented Great Britain in the women's 400 metres at the 1988 Seoul Olympics, and won a bronze medal in the 4 × 400 metres relay at the 1990 European Championships.

== Biography ==
Born in Wolverhampton, Beckford was a member of the Wolverhampton & Bilston Athletics Club. She finished third behind Kathy Cook and Georgina Oladapo in the 200 metres at the 1985 WAAA Championships in 23.74 secs.

At the 1988 AAA Championships and Olympic trials, Beckford finished second behind Linda Keough in the 400 metres in 52.49 ses, to earn Olympic selection. She also finished third in the 200 metres in 23.77, behind Simmone Jacobs (23.37) and Louise Stuart (23.75). A week later on 14 August 1988, she achieved her lifetime best for the 400 meters with 52.26 secs at the International vs Hungary in Gateshead. She then ran her 200 metres best of 23.58 at the McVities Challenge on 28 August 1988 in London (Crystal Palace). At the Seoul Olympic Games in September, she was eliminated in the 400 metres heats, running a disappointing 54.39 due to an injury.

Beckford finished third in the 400 metres at the 1990 UK Championships, and later earned relay selection for the European Championships in Split. The British quartet of Angela Piggford, Jenny Stoute, Beckford and Linda Keough ran 3:28.73 in the heats, to qualify for the final as the fifth fastest. With Sally Gunnell replacing Piggford, they broke the six-year-old British record with 3:24.78 in the final, to win the bronze medal, with Beckford running a 51.9 split.

== International competitions ==
Year	Competition	Venue	Position	Event	Notes
Representing Great Britain
1988	Olympic Games	Seoul, South Korea	32nd (h)	400 m	54.39
1990	European Championships	Split, Yugoslavia	3rd	4 × 400 m	3:28.78
(h) Indicates overall position in qualifying heats
