= 1998 European Athletics Indoor Championships – Women's 400 metres =

Women's 400 metres at the 1998 European Athletics Indoor Championships
- Venue: Luis Puig Palace
- Location: Valencia, Spain
- Date: 28 February 1998 (heats); 1 March 1998 (final)
- Competitors: 13 from 11 nations
- Winning time: 50.45 s

Medalists
| gold medal | Grit Breuer | Germany |
| silver medal | Ionela Târlea | Romania |
| bronze medal | Helena Fuchsová | Czech Republic |

The women's 400 metres event at the 1998 European Athletics Indoor Championships was held at the Luis Puig Palace in Valencia, Spain, on 28 February and 1 March 1998.

== Results ==
=== Heats ===
The winner of each heat (Q) and the next 3 fastest (q) qualified for the final.

Results of the heats
| Rank | Heat | Athlete | Nation | Time | Notes |
|---|---|---|---|---|---|
| 1 | 1 | Ionela Târlea | Romania | 51.44 | Q |
| 2 | 3 | Grit Breuer | Germany | 51.83 | Q |
| 3 | 3 | Irina Rosikhina | Russia | 52.25 | q, PB |
| 4 | 2 | Helena Fuchsová | Czech Republic | 52.27 | Q |
| 5 | 1 | Hana Benešová | Czech Republic | 52.38 | q, SB |
| 6 | 2 | Ester Goossens | Netherlands | 52.52 | q |
| 7 | 3 | Marie-Louise Bévis | France | 52.81 | |
| 8 | 1 | Maria Carmo Tavares | Portugal | 53.06 | |
| 9 | 2 | Patrizia Spuri | Italy | 53.21 | |
| 10 | 1 | Gulnara Safiullina | Russia | 53.28 | |
| 11 | 2 | Karen Shinkins | Ireland | 53.45 | |
| 12 | 3 | Kristina Perica | Croatia | 54.55 | PB |
| 13 | 3 | Žana Minina | Lithuania | 55.82 | |

=== Final ===
Results of the final
| Rank | Athlete | Nation | Time | Notes |
|---|---|---|---|---|
| 1st place, gold medalist(s) | Grit Breuer | Germany | 50.45 | |
| 2nd place, silver medalist(s) | Ionela Târlea | Romania | 50.56 | NR |
| 3rd place, bronze medalist(s) | Helena Fuchsová | Czech Republic | 51.22 | |
| 4 | Ester Goossens | Netherlands | 51.82 | NR |
| 5 | Irina Rosikhina | Russia | 52.73 | |
| 6 | Hana Benešová | Czech Republic | 54.89 | |
