= 1997 IAAF World Indoor Championships – Women's 400 metres =

The women's 400 metres event at the 1997 IAAF World Indoor Championships was held on March 7–9.

== Medalists ==
Gold	Silver	Bronze
Jearl Miles Clark; United States	Sandie Richards; Jamaica	Helena Fuchsová; Czech Republic

== Results ==
=== Heats ===
First 2 of each heat (Q) and next 4 fastest (q) qualified for the semifinals.

Rank	Heat	Name	Nationality	Time	Notes
1	1	Charity Opara	Nigeria	52.02	Q
2	3	Sandie Richards	Jamaica	52.26	Q, PB
3	2	Grit Breuer	Germany	52.43	Q
4	3	Ionela Târlea	Romania	52.49	Q
5	3	Olga Kotlyarova	Russia	52.63	q
5	4	Jearl Miles Clark	United States	52.63	Q
7	2	Helena Fuchsová	Czech Republic	52.69	Q
8	3	Phylis Smith	Great Britain	52.74	q
9	1	Natasha Kaiser-Brown	United States	52.86	Q
10	2	Olabisi Afolabi	Nigeria	52.89	q
11	4	Hana Benešová	Czech Republic	52.94	Q
12	2	Tatyana Movchan	Ukraine	52.96	q
13	1	Sally Gunnell	Great Britain	53.05	
14	4	Deon Hemmings	Jamaica	53.22	
15	4	Guðrún Arnardóttir	Iceland	53.41	
16	4	Nezha Bidouane	Morocco	53.54	
17	1	Olga Moroz	Ukraine	53.82	
18	1	Marina Filipović	Yugoslavia	54.18	
19	2	Adina Valdez	Trinidad and Tobago	55.79	
20	2	Erum Khanum	Pakistan	1:04.74	
	3	Angela Camara	Guinea	DNS	
	3	Ruth Mangue Nve	Equatorial Guinea	DNS	

=== Semifinals ===
First 3 of each semifinal (Q) qualified directly for the final.

Rank	Heat	Name	Nationality	Time	Notes
1	1	Charity Opara	Nigeria	51.26	Q
2	2	Sandie Richards	Jamaica	51.53	Q, PB
3	1	Jearl Miles Clark	United States	51.55	Q, SB
4	1	Ionela Târlea	Romania	52.10	Q, NR
5	2	Grit Breuer	Germany	52.16	Q
6	2	Helena Fuchsová	Czech Republic	52.43	Q
7	1	Tatyana Movchan	Ukraine	52.48	
8	1	Hana Benešová	Czech Republic	52.75	
9	2	Natasha Kaiser-Brown	United States	52.82	
10	2	Phylis Smith	Great Britain	52.86	
11	1	Olga Kotlyarova	Russia	53.17	
12	2	Olabisi Afolabi	Nigeria	53.33	

=== Final ===
Rank	Name	Nationality	Time	Notes
1st place, gold medalist(s)	Jearl Miles Clark	United States	50.96	WL
2nd place, silver medalist(s)	Sandie Richards	Jamaica	51.17	PB
3rd place, bronze medalist(s)	Helena Fuchsová	Czech Republic	52.04	PB
4	Ionela Târlea	Romania	52.06	NR
5	Charity Opara	Nigeria	52.19	
6	Grit Breuer	Germany	52.22	
