= 2000 European Athletics Indoor Championships – Women's 4 × 400 metres relay =

The women's 4 × 400 metres relay event at the 2000 European Athletics Indoor Championships was held on February 27.

== Results ==
Rank	Nation	Competitors	Time	Notes
1st place, gold medalist(s)	Russia	Olesya Zykina, Irina Rosikhina, Yuliya Sotnikova, Svetlana Pospelova	3:32.53	CR
2nd place, silver medalist(s)	Italy	Francesca Carbone, Carla Barbarino, Patrizia Spuri, Virna De Angeli	3:35.01	NR
3rd place, bronze medalist(s)	Romania	Georgeta Lazar, Anca Safta, Otilia Ruicu, Alina Ripanu	3:36.28	
