= Sharon Stewart (athlete) =

Australian middle-distance runner

Personal information
- Born: 17 August 1965 (age 60) Ballarat, Australia

Sport
- Sport: Athletics
- Events: 800 m, 400 m
Medal record
Representing Australia
Commonwealth Games
Silver medal – second place	1990 Auckland	4x400m relay
Bronze medal – third place	1986 Edinburgh	4x400m relay
Bronze medal – third place	1990 Auckland	800m

Sharon Lee Stewart (born 17 August 1965) is a retired Australian middle-distance runner who specialised in the 800 metres. She represented her country at one outdoor and one indoor World Championships. In addition, she won the bronze medal at the 1990 Commonwealth Games.

Her personal bests in the event are 2:00.17 outdoors (Oslo 1991) and 2:03.98 indoors (Seville 1991).

== International competitions ==
Year	Competition	Venue	Position	Event	Notes
Representing Australia
1985	Pacific Conference Games	Berkeley, United States	6th	400 m	54.05
1985	Universiade	Kobe, Japan	6th (sf)	200 m	24.11
1985	Universiade	Kobe, Japan	5th (sf)	400 m	54.05
1985	World Cup	Canberra, Australia	6th	4 × 400 m relay	3:35.93^{1}
1986	Commonwealth Games	Edinburgh, United Kingdom	9th (h)	200 m	23.83
1986	Commonwealth Games	Edinburgh, United Kingdom	7th	400 m	53.53
1986	Commonwealth Games	Edinburgh, United Kingdom	3rd	4 × 400 m relay	3:32.86
1989	Universiade	Duisburg, West Germany	3rd (h)	800 m	2:12.16^{2}
1990	Commonwealth Games	Auckland, New Zealand	3rd	800 m	2:00.87
1990	Commonwealth Games	Auckland, New Zealand	2nd	4 × 400 m relay	3:30.74
1991	World Indoor Championships	Seville, Spain	12th (sf)	800 m	2:03.98
1991	World Championships	Tokyo, Japan	29th (h)	800 m	2:08.72

^{1}Representing Oceania
^{2}Did not finish in the semifinals
