= Guðrún Arnardóttir (hurdler) =

Icelandic hurdler

Guðrún Arnardóttir (born 24 September 1971) is a retired Icelandic athlete who specialized in the 400 metres hurdles. Her biggest success was reaching the final at the 2000 Olympic Games in Sydney where she finished seventh. In 2022, she was inducted in to the National Olympic and Sports Association of Iceland Hall of Fame.

Arnardottir competed for the Georgia Bulldogs track and field team in the NCAA.

== Competition record ==
Year	Competition	Venue	Position	Event	Notes
Representing Iceland
1986	World Junior Championships	Athens, Greece	32rd (h)	100m	12.62 (wind: +1.8 m/s)
1986	World Junior Championships	Athens, Greece	34th (h)	200m	25.85 (wind: -0.4 m/s)
1990	World Junior Championships	Plovdiv, Bulgaria	18th (h)	100 m hurdles	14.30 (wind: +0.6 m/s)
1991	Games of the Small States of Europe	Andorra la Vella, Andorra	2nd	100 m	12.26
1991	Games of the Small States of Europe	Andorra la Vella, Andorra	1st	200 m	24.72
1991	Games of the Small States of Europe	Andorra la Vella, Andorra	1st	100 m hurdles	14.19
1993	World Championships	Stuttgart, Germany	38th (h)	100 m hurdles	13.96
1994	European Championships	Helsinki, Finland	25th (h)	100m hurdles	13.53 (wind: +0.8 m/s)
1995	World Championships	Gothenburg, Sweden	12th (sf)	400 m hurdles	57.29
1996	Olympic Games	Atlanta, United States	10th (sf)	400 m hurdles	54.81
1997	World Indoor Championships	Paris, France	15th (h)	400 m	53.41
1997	Games of the Small States of Europe	Reykjavík, Iceland	1st	200 m	23.66 (w)
1997	Games of the Small States of Europe	Reykjavík, Iceland	1st	400 m	55.05
1997	Games of the Small States of Europe	Reykjavík, Iceland	1st	100 m hurdles	13.20 (w)
1997	Games of the Small States of Europe	Reykjavík, Iceland	1st	4 × 100 m relay	48.03
1997	World Championships	Athens, Greece	9th (sf)	400 m hurdles	54.93
1998	European Championships	Budapest, Hungary	4th	400 m hurdles	54.59 (NR)
1999	World Championships	Seville, Spain	19th (h)	400 m hurdles	55.45
2000	European Indoor Championships	Ghent, Belgium	13th (h)	60 m hurdles	8.31 (=iNR)
2000	European Indoor Championships	Ghent, Belgium	9th (sf)	400 m	53.14
2000	Olympic Games	Sydney, Australia	7th	400 m hurdles	54.63

== Personal bests ==
Outdoor

- 200 metres – 23.81 (Odense 1997) NR
- 400 metres – 52.83 (London 1997) NR
- 100 metres hurdles – 13.18 (+1.2 m/s) (Lexington 1996) NR
- 400 metres hurdles – 54.37 (London 2000) NR

Indoor

- 400 metres – 53.11 (Baton Rouge 1995) NR
- 50 metres hurdles – 6.89 (Reykjavík 2000) NR
- 60 metres hurdles – 8.31 (Lexington 1996, Gent 2000) NR
