= 1988 World Junior Championships in Athletics – Women's 400 metres =

The women's 400 metres event at the 1988 World Junior Championships in Athletics was held in Sudbury, Ontario, Canada, at Laurentian University Stadium on 27th, 28th and 29th July.

== Medalists ==
Gold	Grit Breuer; East Germany
Silver	Maicel Malone; United States
Bronze	Olga Moroz; Soviet Union

== Results ==
=== Final ===
29 July

Rank	Name	Nationality	Time	Notes
1st place, gold medalist(s)	Grit Breuer	East Germany	51.24	
2nd place, silver medalist(s)	Maicel Malone	United States	52.23	
3rd place, bronze medalist(s)	Olga Moroz	Soviet Union	53.20	
4	Viktoria Miloserdova	Soviet Union	53.64	
5	Manuela Derr	East Germany	53.66	
6	Teri Smith	United States	53.80	
7	Nadežda Tomšová	Czechoslovakia	54.21	
8	Rossana Morabito	Italy	55.20	

=== Semifinals ===
28 July

==== Semifinal 1 ====
Rank	Name	Nationality	Time	Notes
1	Teri Smith	United States	53.20	Q
2	Manuela Derr	East Germany	53.43	Q
3	Viktoria Miloserdova	Soviet Union	53.58	q
4	Cheryl Allen	Canada	53.92	
5	Daniela Plescan	Romania	54.09	
6	Daniela Spasova	Bulgaria	54.63	
7	Noemi Batori	Hungary	56.09	
	Linda Kisabaka	West Germany	DNF	

==== Semifinal 2 ====
Rank	Name	Nationality	Time	Notes
1	Maicel Malone	United States	52.07	Q
2	Olga Moroz	Soviet Union	52.86	Q
3	Nadežda Tomšová	Czechoslovakia	53.14	q
4	Marjana Lužar	Yugoslavia	54.49	
5	Emma Langston	United Kingdom	54.62	
6	Julia Merino	Spain	55.12	
7	Regula Scalabrin	Switzerland	55.18	
8	Felicia Amajali	Nigeria	55.99	

==== Semifinal 3 ====
Rank	Name	Nationality	Time	Notes
1	Grit Breuer	East Germany	53.11	Q
2	Rossana Morabito	Italy	54.03	Q
3	Suzana Belac	Yugoslavia	54.18	
4	Tracy Goddard	United Kingdom	54.63	
5	Catherine Chanfreau	France	55.10	
6	Mayelin Lemus	Cuba	55.59	
7	Sue Andrews	Australia	55.82	
	Ximena Restrepo	Colombia	DQ	

=== Heats ===
27 July

==== Heat 1 ====
Rank	Name	Nationality	Time	Notes
1	Nadežda Tomšová	Czechoslovakia	54.20	Q
2	Daniela Spasova	Bulgaria	54.21	Q
3	Linda Kisabaka	West Germany	54.88	Q
4	Catherine Chanfreau	France	55.19	q
5	Gro Hege Cleveland	Norway	56.07	
6	Anna Cherry	Saint Lucia	57.30	
7	Natasha Stenberg	Australia	57.82	

==== Heat 2 ====
Rank	Name	Nationality	Time	Notes
1	Ximena Restrepo	Colombia	53.48	Q
2	Olga Moroz	Soviet Union	54.15	Q
3	Tracy Goddard	United Kingdom	54.63	Q
4	Sue Andrews	Australia	54.84	q
5	Daniela Plescan	Romania	55.42	q
6	Valérie Jaunâtre	France	56.86	
7	Christine Duvergé	Mauritius	56.95	

==== Heat 3 ====
Rank	Name	Nationality	Time	Notes
1	Viktoria Miloserdova	Soviet Union	54.13	Q
2	Regula Scalabrin	Switzerland	55.93	Q
3	Mayelin Lemus	Cuba	56.15	Q
4	Katalin Fogarassy	Hungary	56.35	

==== Heat 4 ====
Rank	Name	Nationality	Time	Notes
1	Manuela Derr	East Germany	54.13	Q
2	Suzana Belac	Yugoslavia	54.17	Q
3	Rossana Morabito	Italy	54.19	Q
4	Teri Smith	United States	54.23	q
5	Monique Steennis	Netherlands	55.67	
6	Ausa Mwendachabe	Zambia	58.50	
7	Marie-Cecile Rivetta	Monaco	63.31	

==== Heat 5 ====
Rank	Name	Nationality	Time	Notes
1	Julia Merino	Spain	54.99	Q
2	Grit Breuer	East Germany	55.12	Q
3	Cheryl Allen	Canada	55.44	Q
4	Nancy McLeón	Cuba	55.47	
5	Fatima Yusuf	Nigeria	56.35	
6	Jacqueline Sophia	Netherlands Antilles	58.92	

==== Heat 6 ====
Rank	Name	Nationality	Time	Notes
1	Maicel Malone	United States	53.79	Q
2	Marjana Lužar	Yugoslavia	54.77	Q
3	Emma Langston	United Kingdom	54.87	Q
4	Noemi Batori	Hungary	54.97	q
5	Felicia Amajali	Nigeria	55.39	q
6	Julieta Kondova	Bulgaria	56.40	
7	Kristen Lundgren	Canada	56.48	

== Participation ==
According to an unofficial count, 38 athletes from 26 countries participated in the event.

- Australia (2)
- Bulgaria (2)
- Canada (2)
- Colombia (1)
- Cuba (2)
- Czechoslovakia (1)
- East Germany (2)
- France (2)
- Hungary (2)
- Italy (1)
- Mauritius (1)
- Monaco (1)
- Netherlands (1)
- Netherlands Antilles (1)
- Nigeria (2)
- Norway (1)
- Romania (1)
- Saint Lucia (1)
- Soviet Union (2)
- Spain (1)
- Switzerland (1)
- United Kingdom (2)
- United States (2)
- West Germany (1)
- Yugoslavia (2)
- Zambia (1)
