= Karen Shinkins =

Irish sprinter

Personal information
- Born: 15 October 1976 (age 50) Newbridge, County Kildare, Ireland

Sport
- Sport: Track and field
Medal record
Representing Ireland
European Indoor Championships
Bronze medal – third place	2002 Vienna	400m

Karen Shinkins (born 15 October 1976) is a retired Irish sprinter who specialised in the 400 metres. She represented her country at the 2000 Summer Olympics, as well as four consecutive World Championships, starting in 1999.

She has personal bests of 51.07 (1999) outdoors and 51.58 indoors (2002).

== Competition record ==
Year	Competition	Venue	Position	Event	Notes
Representing Ireland
1994	World Junior Championships	Lisbon, Portugal	30th (qf)	200 m	25.20 (wind: +0.8 m/s)
1998	European Indoor Championships	Valencia, Spain	11th (h)	400 m	53.45
1999	Universiade	Palma de Mallorca, Spain	4th	400 m	51.07
1999	World Championships	Seville, Spain	25th (qf)	400 m	52.08
2000	European Indoor Championships	Ghent, Belgium	4th	400 m	53.15
2000	Olympic Games	Sydney, Australia	34th (h)	400 m	53.27
2000	Olympic Games	Sydney, Australia	16th (h)	4 × 400 m relay	3:32.24
2001	World Indoor Championships	Lisbon, Portugal	18th (h)	400 m	53.90
2001	World Championships	Edmonton, Canada	15th (sf)	400 m	51.66
2002	European Indoor Championships	Vienna, Austria	3rd	400 m	52.17
2002	European Championships	Munich, Germany	11th (h)	400 m	52.50
2003	World Indoor Championships	Birmingham, United Kingdom	16th (h)	400 m	53.59
2003	World Championships	Paris, France	23rd (sf)	400 m	52.74
2004	World Indoor Championships	Budapest, Hungary	22nd (h)	400 m	54.37
2004	World Indoor Championships	Budapest, Hungary	9th (h)	4 × 400 m relay	3:34.61
2005	World Championships	Helsinki, Finland	19th (sf)	400 m	52.17
