= Athletics at the 1986 Commonwealth Games – Women's 200 metres =

Women's 200 metres at the Commonwealth Games

The women's 200 metres event at the 1986 Commonwealth Games was held on 28 and 31 July at the Meadowbank Stadium in Edinburgh.

== Medalists ==
Gold	Silver	Bronze
Angella Issajenko; Canada	Kathy Cook; England	Sandra Whittaker; Scotland

== Results ==
=== Heats ===
Qualification: First 3 of each heat (Q) and the next 2 fastest (q) qualified for the final.

Wind:
Heat 1: +1.1 m/s, Heat 2: +0.3 m/s

Rank	Heat	Name	Nationality	Time	Notes
1	2	Angella Issajenko	Canada	22.96	Q
2	1	Kathy Cook	England	23.30	Q
3	1	Jennifer Stoute	England	23.39	Q
4	2	Sandra Whittaker	Scotland	23.41	Q
5	1	Maree Chapman	Australia	23.43	Q
6	2	Simmone Jacobs	England	23.63	Q
7	2	Esmie Lawrence	Canada	23.70	q
8	1	Sian Morris	Wales	23.82	q
9	1	Sharon Stewart	Australia	23.83	
10	2	Kerry Johnson	Australia	23.96	
11	2	Sallyanne Short	Wales	24.06	
12	1	Angela Bridgeman	Scotland	24.13	
13	2	Carmen Smart	Wales	24.31	
14	1	Mary-Estelle Kapalu	Vanuatu	26.02	
15	2	Sharon Mifsud	Gibraltar	26.04	
	1	Angela Bailey	Canada	DNS	

=== Final ===
Wind: +2.1 m/s

Rank	Lane	Name	Nationality	Time	Notes
1st place, gold medalist(s)	4	Angella Issajenko	Canada	22.91	
2nd place, silver medalist(s)	3	Kathy Cook	England	23.18	
3rd place, bronze medalist(s)	5	Sandra Whittaker	Scotland	23.46	
4	7	Simmone Jacobs	England	23.48	
5	8	Maree Chapman	Australia	23.64	
6	2	Esmie Lawrence	Canada	23.87	
7	1	Sian Morris	Wales	23.97	
	6	Jennifer Stoute	England	DNF	
