= 1990 World Junior Championships in Athletics – Women's 400 metres =

The women's 400 metres event at the 1990 World Junior Championships in Athletics was held in Plovdiv, Bulgaria, at Deveti Septemvri Stadium on 8, 9 and 10 August.

== Medalists ==
Gold	Fatima Yusuf; Nigeria
Silver	Charity Opara; Nigeria
Bronze	Manuela Derr; East Germany

== Results ==
=== Final ===
10 August

Rank	Name	Nationality	Time	Notes
1st place, gold medalist(s)	Fatima Yusuf	Nigeria	50.62	
2nd place, silver medalist(s)	Charity Opara	Nigeria	51.28	
3rd place, bronze medalist(s)	Manuela Derr	East Germany	51.95	
4	Sue Andrews	Australia	52.23	
5	Julia Merino	Spain	53.48	
6	Nancy McLeón	Cuba	53.58	
7	Marína Vasarmídou	Greece	53.58	
8	Anja Rücker	East Germany	54.16	

=== Semifinals ===
9 August

==== Semifinal 1 ====
Rank	Name	Nationality	Time	Notes
1	Charity Opara	Nigeria	51.69	Q
2	Manuela Derr	East Germany	52.91	Q
3	Nancy McLeón	Cuba	53.32	Q
4	Julia Merino	Spain	53.34	Q
5	Catherine Scott	Jamaica	53.46	
6	Natalya Sniga	Soviet Union	54.17	
7	Ester Goossens	Netherlands	54.70	
8	Nicole Hylaire	France	55.69	

==== Semifinal 2 ====
Rank	Name	Nationality	Time	Notes
1	Fatima Yusuf	Nigeria	52.15	Q
2	Sue Andrews	Australia	53.40	Q
3	Marína Vasarmídou	Greece	53.83	Q
4	Anja Rücker	East Germany	54.04	Q
5	Claudine Williams	Jamaica	54.28	
6	Yana Burtasenkova	Soviet Union	54.35	
7	Steffanie Smith	United States	54.44	
8	Yojani Casanova	Cuba	56.23	

=== Heats ===
8 August

==== Heat 1 ====
Rank	Name	Nationality	Time	Notes
1	Fatima Yusuf	Nigeria	52.97	Q
2	Yana Burtasenkova	Soviet Union	54.66	Q
3	Nicole Hylaire	France	54.85	Q
4	Catherine Scott	Jamaica	54.94	q
5	Cheryl Allen	Canada	55.16	
6	Rosa Magaly Segovia	Colombia	57.14	

==== Heat 2 ====
Rank	Name	Nationality	Time	Notes
1	Charity Opara	Nigeria	52.77	Q
2	Manuela Derr	East Germany	53.90	Q
3	Claudine Williams	Jamaica	54.02	Q
4	Steffanie Smith	United States	54.72	q
5	Stefka Mineva	Bulgaria	56.33	
6	Mireille Bara-Ang	Central African Republic	64.80	
	Camille Noel	Canada	DNF	

==== Heat 3 ====
Rank	Name	Nationality	Time	Notes
1	Sue Andrews	Australia	53.53	Q
2	Anja Rücker	East Germany	54.01	Q
3	Julia Merino	Spain	54.18	Q
4	Natalya Sniga	Soviet Union	54.27	q
5	Yojani Casanova	Cuba	55.00	q
6	Melrose Mansaray	Sierra Leone	56.44	

==== Heat 4 ====
Rank	Name	Nationality	Time	Notes
1	Nancy McLeón	Cuba	53.70	Q
2	Ester Goossens	Netherlands	54.27	Q
3	Marína Vasarmídou	Greece	54.60	Q
4	Renée Poetschka	Australia	55.18	
5	Mirjana Šola	Yugoslavia	55.52	
6	Shanelle Porter	United States	56.63	

== Participation ==
According to an unofficial count, 25 athletes from 17 countries participated in the event.

- Australia (2)
- Bulgaria (1)
- Canada (2)
- Central African Republic (1)
- Colombia (1)
- Cuba (2)
- East Germany (2)
- France (1)
- Greece (1)
- Jamaica (2)
- Netherlands (1)
- Nigeria (2)
- Sierra Leone (1)
- Soviet Union (2)
- Spain (1)
- United States (2)
- Yugoslavia (1)
