= Nadia Graham =

Jamaican sprinter (born 1974)

Personal information
- Born: November 3, 1974 (age 51)
Medal record
Women's athletics
Representing Jamaica
IAAF World Championships
Bronze medal – third place	1997 Athens	4 × 400 m

Nadia Graham (born September 3, 1974), also known as Nadia Graham-Hutchinson and Nadia Graham-Hutchins, was a professional sprinter from Jamaica. She won a bronze medal in the 4 × 400 m relay at the 1997 World Championships in Athletics by virtue of running for her team in the preliminary rounds.

In 1996, Graham was honored as female athlete of the year at Middle Tennessee State University. In 1997, her time of 51.45 seconds in the 400 m representing the University of Florida at the Southeastern Conference was at the time a collegiate NCAA Division I leader.
