= Linda Keough =

British sprinter

Linda Staines née Keough
Personal information
- Nationality: British (English)
- Born: 28 December 1963 (age 62) Hackney, London, England
- Height: 174 cm (5 ft 9 in)
- Weight: 60 kg (132 lb)

Sport
- Sport: Athletics
- Event: 400m
- Club: Basingstoke AC
Medal record
Women's athletics
Representing Great Britain
World Championships
| Bronze medal – third place | 1993 Stuttgart | 4x400 m |
European Championships
| Bronze medal – third place | 1990 Split | 4×400 m |
Representing England
Commonwealth Games
| Gold medal – first place | 1990 Auckland | 4×400 m |
| Gold medal – first place | 1994 Victoria | 4×400 m |
| Silver medal – second place | 1986 Edinburgh | 4×400 m |
| Silver medal – second place | 1990 Auckland | 400 m |

Linda Staines (née Keough, born 28 December 1963) is a female former British track and field athlete who competed mainly in the 400 metres. She represented Great Britain at the 1988 Olympic Games in Seoul in both the 400 metres and 4 x 400 metres relay, and won a bronze medal in the 4 × 400 m relay at the 1993 World Championships. She also won four medals at the Commonwealth Games, including an individual silver medal in the 400 metres in 1990 and two relay gold medals.

== Biography ==
Keough was born in Hackney, London, England, and was a member of the Basingstoke & Mid Hants Athletic Club. In 1980, as a 16-year-old, she ran 53.7 secs for the 400 metres.

Keough finished second behind Tracy Lawton in the 400 mertres event at the 1984 WAAA Championships.

In 1985, Keough improved her PB to 52.49 at the European Cup in Moscow. This time ranked her second in the UK for that year, behind Kathy Cook. In 1986, she won a silver medal representing England at the Commonwealth Games in Edinburgh, in the 4x400 metres relay, along with Jane Parry, Angela Piggford and Cook. Keogh became the British 400 metres champion after winning the British WAAA Championships title at the 1987 WAAA Championships

In 1988, Keough emerged as the UK's top ranked female 400 m runner. In June, she won the UK Athletics Championships title in 52.25, before improving her personal best to 51.65 in winning the 1989 AAA Championships title, earning Olympic selection. At the Seoul Games, she reached the quarter-finals of the 400 metres, running 51.91 and reached the final of the 4 × 400 m relay, where along with Jennifer Stoute, Angela Piggford and Sally Gunnell, she finished sixth.

Keough had one of the best seasons of her career in 1989. She retained her UK title, winning in 52.37. Then at the European Cup in Gateshead, she ran 51.66, to finish second behind East Germany's Grit Breuer and ahead of that years World Indoor Champion, Helga Arendt of West Germany. In retaining the 1989 AAA Championships 400 m title, she improved her PB to 51.09. She also earned selection for the IAAF World Cup in Barcelona, as a member of Europe's 4 x 400 metres relay squad. The American magazine Track & Field News ranked her in the top ten of their world merit rankings in the 400 metres, at #7.

Representing England at the 1990 Commonwealth Games in Auckland in January, Keough won two medals. In the 400 metres she won a silver medal in 51.63, behind Nigeria'a Fatima Yusuf and ahead of another Nigerian Charity Opara. In the 4x400 metres relay, she won a gold medal, along with Jennifer Stoute, Angela Piggford and Sally Gunnell.

Later in 1990, she ran 51.22 to finish fifth in the 400 metres final at the European Championships in Split. Then along with Stoute, Pat Beckford and Gunnell, she won a bronze medal in the 4 × 400 m relay, running a fine anchor leg in 50.1.

Keough reached her peak in 1991. At the World Championships in Tokyo, she reached the semi-finals, where she ran a lifetime best of 50.98. She then went on to run a 49.7 split, in anchoring the British relay team to fourth place. The quartet of Lorraine Hanson, Phylis Smith, Sally Gunnell and Keough set a UK record of 3:22.01, that would stand for 16 years.

Keough missed the 1992 season due to injury. In 1993, she returned, and spent most of the year concentrating on the 800 metres. She finished second to Kelly Holmes at both the UK Championships and AAAs Championships. She achieved her best, with 2:01.82 at the Cologne Grand Prix. At the World Championships in Stuttgart, she was a late replacement for Phylis Smith in the individual 400 metres and reached the semi-finals. Then in the 4 × 400 m relay, she won a bronze medal, along with Smith, Tracy Goddard and Sally Gunnell.

In 1994, Keough won another Commonwealth Games gold medal, representing England in the 4 × 400 m relay. The original winners, Australia, were disqualified. Her teammates were Phylis Smith, Tracy Joseph (Goddard) and Sally Gunnell. Representing Great Britain, she was a member of the 4 × 400 m relay squad that won at the IAAF World Cup in London, along with Smith, Melanie Neef and Gunnell. In 1996, now competing as Linda Staines, she reached the 400 metres final at the UK Olympic trials in Birmingham but failed to earn selection for Atlanta.

In 2005, she set a UK masters record (age 40+) in the 400 metres with 54.81. In 2006, she ran a UK masters record of 2:06.86 for 800 metres. Both records (as of 2014) still stand. In 2007, at 43, she ran the London Marathon in 3:19.28. A year later, at the Chicago Marathon she ran 3:15.03.

== Personal life ==
She married athlete Gary Staines, who also competed at the 1988 Olympic Games, where he reached the final of the 5000 metres.
