= Athletics at the 1985 Summer Universiade – Women's 400 metres =

The women's 400 metres event at the 1985 Summer Universiade was held at the Kobe Universiade Memorial Stadium in Kobe on 30 and 31 August.

== Medalists ==
Gold	Silver	Bronze
Tatyana Alekseyeva; Soviet Union	Ana Fidelia Quirot; Cuba	Sadia Showunmi; Nigeria

== Results ==
=== Heats ===
Held on 30 August

Rank	Heat	Athlete	Nationality	Time	Notes
1	2	Tatyana Alekseyeva	Soviet Union	52.25	Q
2	4	Ana Fidelia Quirot	Cuba	52.60	Q
3	2	Sadia Showunmi	Nigeria	52.86	Q
4	1	Molly Killingbeck	Canada	53.01	Q
5	4	Kehinde Vaughan	Nigeria	53.16	Q
6	2	Tanya McIntosh	United States	53.58	Q
7	4	Charmaine Crooks	Canada	53.60	Q
8	4	Gabi Lesch	West Germany	53.80	q
9	3	Yelena Korban	Soviet Union	54.12	Q
10	3	Sharon Stewart	Australia	54.47	Q
11	1	Sharon Dabney	United States	54.48	Q
12	1	Nicoletta Belloli	Italy	54.96	Q
13	1	Geraldine Shitandayi	Kenya	55.12	q
14	2	Ruth Waithera	Kenya	55.22	q
15	3	Linsey MacDonald	Great Britain	55.58	Q
16	2	Eman Sabeeh Hussain	Iraq	55.73	q
17	3	Donya Mohamed	Iraq	56.31	
18	1	Fumiko Ono	Japan	57.01	
19	2	Yoko Sato	Japan	57.26	
20	4	C. Nalikka	Uganda	59.26	
21	1	Long Pham Kieu	Vietnam	1:02.75	

=== Semifinals ===
Held on 31 August

Rank	Heat	Athlete	Nationality	Time	Notes
1	1	Tatyana Alekseyeva	Soviet Union	51.43	Q
2	2	Ana Fidelia Quirot	Cuba	51.78	Q
3	1	Molly Killingbeck	Canada	52.10	Q
4	2	Yelena Korban	Soviet Union	52.40	Q
5	2	Sadia Showunmi	Nigeria	52.77	Q
6	2	Charmaine Crooks	Canada	52.89	q
7	1	Kehinde Vaughan	Nigeria	53.19	Q
8	1	Sharon Dabney	United States	53.56?	q
9	1	Gabi Lesch	West Germany	53.52?	
10	2	Sharon Stewart	Australia	54.05	
11	2	Tanya McIntosh	United States	54.06	
12	1	Geraldine Shitandayi	Kenya	54.13	
13	2	Linsey MacDonald	Great Britain	55.09	
14	2	Ruth Waithera	Kenya	55.65	
15	1	Nicoletta Belloli	Italy	55.68	
16	1	Eman Sabeeh Hussain	Iraq	55.77	

=== Final ===
Held on 31 August

Rank	Athlete	Nationality	Time	Notes
1st place, gold medalist(s)	Tatyana Alekseyeva	Soviet Union	51.49	
2nd place, silver medalist(s)	Ana Fidelia Quirot	Cuba	52.10	
3rd place, bronze medalist(s)	Sadia Showunmi	Nigeria	52.78	
4	Molly Killingbeck	Canada	52.89	
5	Yelena Korban	Soviet Union	53.17	
6	Charmaine Crooks	Canada	53.23	
7	Kehinde Vaughan	Nigeria	53.55	
8	Sharon Dabney	United States	54.99	
