= Maree Holland =

Australian sprinter (born 1963)

Personal information
- Born: 25 July 1963 (age 62) Parramatta, New South Wales, Australia
- Height: 1.69 m (5 ft 7 in)
- Weight: 55 kg (121 lb)

Sport
- Sport: Athletics
- Event(s): 200 m, 400 m
- Club: Western Suburbs AAC

Maree Anne Holland (born 25 July 1963) is a retired Australian sprinter who specialised in the 400 metres. She represented her country at the 1988 Summer Olympics finishing eighth in the final. She also competed at the 1989 World Indoor Championships and 1990 Commonwealth Games finishing fourth on both occasions.

Maree, she won the British WAAA Championships title in the 400 metres event at the 1985 WAAA Championships.

== International competitions ==
Year	Competition	Venue	Position	Event	Notes
Representing Australia
1985	Pacific Conference Games	Berkeley, United States	2nd	200 m	23.59
1985	Pacific Conference Games	Berkeley, United States	2nd	400 m	45.00
1985	Pacific Conference Games	Berkeley, United States	3rd	4 × 100 m relay	3:33.40
1985	Pacific Conference Games	Berkeley, United States	2nd	4 × 400 m relay	3:33.40
1985	World Cup	Canberra, Australia	6th	200 m	23.71^{1}
1985	World Cup	Canberra, Australia	–	4 × 100 m relay	DQ^{1}
1985	World Cup	Canberra, Australia	6th	4 × 400 m relay	3:35.93^{1}
1986	Commonwealth Games	Edinburgh, United Kingdom	5th	200 m	23.64
1986	Commonwealth Games	Edinburgh, United Kingdom	6th	400 m	52.08
1986	Commonwealth Games	Edinburgh, United Kingdom	3rd	4 × 400 m relay	3:32.86
1988	Olympic Games	Seoul, South Korea	8th	400 m	51.25
1988	Olympic Games	Seoul, South Korea	–	4 × 400 m relay	DNF
1989	World Indoor Championships	Budapest, Hungary	4th	400 m	52.17
1989	World Cup	Barcelona, Spain	6th	4 × 400 m relay	3:33.72^{1}
1990	Commonwealth Games	Auckland, New Zealand	4th	400 m	52.01
1990	Commonwealth Games	Auckland, New Zealand	2nd	4 × 400 m relay	3:30.74
1992	World Cup	Havana, Cuba	6th	4 × 400 m relay	3:34.48

^{1}Representing Oceania

== Personal bests ==
Outdoor

- 200 metres – 22.83 (+1.7 m/s, Chiba 1988)
- 400 metres – 50.24 (Seoul 1988)

Indoor

- 400 metres – 52.17 (Budapest 1989) AR
