= 1998 World Junior Championships in Athletics – Women's 400 metres =

The women's 400 metres event at the 1998 World Junior Championships in Athletics was held in Annecy, France, at Parc des Sports on 28, 29 and 31 July.

== Medalists ==
Gold	Natalya Nazarova; Russia
Silver	Nakiya Johnson; United States
Bronze	Yudalis Díaz; Cuba

== Results ==
=== Final ===
31 July

Rank	Name	Nationality	Time	Notes
1st place, gold medalist(s)	Natalya Nazarova	Russia	52.02	
2nd place, silver medalist(s)	Nakiya Johnson	United States	52.09	
3rd place, bronze medalist(s)	Yudalis Díaz	Cuba	52.39	
4	Alina Rîpanu	Romania	52.89	
5	Estie Wittstock	South Africa	53.16	
6	Justine Bayiga	Uganda	53.29	
7	Keasha Downer	Jamaica	53.68	
8	Mikele Barber	United States	54.24	

=== Semifinals ===
29 July

==== Semifinal 1 ====
Rank	Name	Nationality	Time	Notes
1	Natalya Nazarova	Russia	51.95	Q
2	Nakiya Johnson	United States	52.80	Q
3	Keasha Downer	Jamaica	53.01	Q
4	Alina Rîpanu	Romania	53.34	q
5	Zulia Calatayúd	Cuba	53.65	
6	Kristin Götz	Germany	54.41	
7	Martina Morawska	Czech Republic	54.48	
8	Carey Easton	United Kingdom	54.70	

==== Semifinal 2 ====
Rank	Name	Nationality	Time	Notes
1	Justine Bayiga	Uganda	52.73	Q
2	Yudalis Díaz	Cuba	53.07	Q
3	Estie Wittstock	South Africa	53.20	Q
4	Mikele Barber	United States	53.44	q
5	Kristina Perica	Croatia	53.60	
6	Rosemary Hayward	Australia	54.34	
7	Alexia Oberstolz	Italy	54.51	
8	Katerina Glosová	Czech Republic	54.58	

=== Heats ===
28 July

==== Heat 1 ====
Rank	Name	Nationality	Time	Notes
1	Natalya Nazarova	Russia	52.98	Q
2	Justine Bayiga	Uganda	53.23	Q
3	Rosemary Hayward	Australia	53.90	Q
4	Estie Wittstock	South Africa	54.18	q
5	Carey Easton	United Kingdom	54.28	q
6	Aleksandra Pielużek	Poland	54.69	
7	Lotte Visschers	Netherlands	55.72	

==== Heat 2 ====
Rank	Name	Nationality	Time	Notes
1	Nakiya Johnson	United States	53.07	Q
2	Alina Rîpanu	Romania	53.36	Q
3	Zulia Calatayúd	Cuba	54.00	Q
4	Svetlana Pospelova	Russia	54.80	
5	Jennifer Marshall	Australia	54.88	
6	Sashanie Simpson	Jamaica	54.96	
7	Lucy-Ann Richards	Barbados	55.29	

==== Heat 3 ====
Rank	Name	Nationality	Time	Notes
1	Kristina Perica	Croatia	53.89	Q
2	Keasha Downer	Jamaica	53.94	Q
3	Alexia Oberstolz	Italy	54.48	Q
4	Katerina Glosová	Czech Republic	54.53	q
5	Hazel-Ann Regis	Grenada	55.55	
6	Oksana Luneva	Kyrgyzstan	57.54	

==== Heat 4 ====
Rank	Name	Nationality	Time	Notes
1	Yudalis Díaz	Cuba	52.74	Q
2	Mikele Barber	United States	53.86	Q
3	Martina Morawska	Czech Republic	54.13	Q
4	Kristin Götz	Germany	54.27	q
5	Lu Minling	China	55.35	
6	Yolandé Neethling	South Africa	56.28	
7	Diala El-Chabi	Lebanon	58.92	
8	Mariama Diaby	Guinea	59.06	

== Participation ==
According to an unofficial count, 28 athletes from 21 countries participated in the event.

- Australia (2)
- Barbados (1)
- China (1)
- Croatia (1)
- Cuba (2)
- Czech Republic (2)
- Germany (1)
- Grenada (1)
- Guinea (1)
- Italy (1)
- Jamaica (2)
- Kyrgyzstan (1)
- Lebanon (1)
- Netherlands (1)
- Poland (1)
- Romania (1)
- Russia (2)
- South Africa (2)
- Uganda (1)
- United Kingdom (1)
- United States (2)
