= Shuji Ujino =

Japanese high jumper

Personal information
- Born: 15 January 1960 (age 66)

Sport
- Sport: Athletics
- Event: High jump

Achievements and titles
- Personal best: 2.28 m (1984)
Medal record
Representing Japan
Men's athletics
Asian Games
Bronze medal – third place	1986 Seoul	High jump
Asian Championships
Gold medal – first place	1985 Jakarta	High jump
Bronze medal – third place	1981 Tokyo	High jump

Shuji Ujino (born 15 January 1960) is a Japanese former track and field athlete who competed in the high jump. He competed internationally for Japan in the 1980s, with his highest honour being a gold medal at the 1985 Asian Athletics Championships, which he won with a jump of 2.24 m (7 ft 4 in). He also won bronze medals at the 1981 Asian Athletics Championships held In Tokyo, the 1985 Pacific Conference Games, and the 1986 Asian Games.

At national level, Ujino twice won the high jump title at the Japan Championships in Athletics, topping the podium in 1985 and 1986. He set a lifetime best of 2.28 m (7 ft 5 3/4 in) in Wakayama on 21 July 1984, and matched that feat in Seoul on 14 September 1985.

== International competitions ==
Year	Competition	Venue	Position	Notes
1981	Asian Championships	Tokyo, Japan	3rd	2.21 m
1985	Pacific Conference Games	Berkeley, United States	3rd	2.18 m
1985	Asian Championships	Jakarta, Indonesia	1st	2.24 m
1985	World Cup	Canberra, Australia	6th	2.15 m
1986	Asian Games	Seoul, South Korea	3rd	2.21 m

== National titles ==
- Japan Championships in Athletics
  - High jump: 1985, 1986

== See also ==
- List of Asian Games medalists in athletics
- List of high jump national champions (men)
