= Ester Goossens =

Dutch athlete (born 1972)

Personal information
- Born: 21 February 1972 (age 54) Amsterdam, Netherlands
- Height: 1.75 m (5 ft 9 in)
- Weight: 64 kg (141 lb)

Sport
- Sport: Track and field
- Events: 400 m, 800 m, 400 m hurdles, combined events

Ester Goossens (pronounced [ˈɛstər ˈɣoːsə(n)s]; born 21 February 1972) is a retired Dutch athlete who competed in a variety of events, including the 400 metres, 800 metres and 400 metres hurdles. She represented her country at the 1997 World Championships and 1999 World Indoor Championships.

Goossens held the Dutch records in the 400 metres of 51.35 s from 1998 until 2018, when it was broken by Lisanne de Witte, in the 400 metres hurdles of 54.62 s from 1998 until 2020, when it was broken by Femke Bol, in the 400 metres indoor of 51.82 s from 1998 until 2021, when it was broken by Lieke Klaver, and in the 800 metres indoor of 2:00.01 min from 2001 to 2026, when it was also broken by Bol.

In October 1997, Goossens scored 6716 points at a women's decathlon in Apeldoorn, setting a world decathlon best of 54.14 seconds in the flat 400 m.

== Personal bests ==
Outdoor

- 200 metres – 23.84 (Talence 1997)
- 400 metres – 51.35 (Malmö 1998)
- 800 metres – 1:59.24 (Hechtel 1998)
- 100 metres hurdles – 14.49 (+1.9 m/s) (Lisse 2002)
- 400 metres hurdles – 54.62 (Budapest 1998)

Indoor

- 200 metres – 24.29 (The Hague 1999)
- 400 metres – 51.82 (Valencia 1998)
- 800 metres – 2:00.01 (Stockholm 2001)
- 60 metres hurdles – 8.94 (Frankfurt 1997)
- High jump – 1.64 (Frankfurt 1997)
- Long jump – 5.87 (Frankfurt 1997)
- Shot put – 11.81 (Frankfurt 1997)
- Pentathlon – 4212 (Frankfurt 1997)

== Competition record ==
Representing the Netherlands
| Year | Competition | Venue | Position | Event | Time | Notes |
|---|---|---|---|---|---|---|
| 1988 | World Junior Championships | Sudbury, Canada | 12th (h) | 4×400m relay | 3:45.30 | |
| 1990 | World Junior Championships | Plovdiv, Bulgaria | 14th (sf) | 400 m | 54.70 | |
| 1991 | European Junior Championships | Thessaloniki, Greece | 7th | 400 m | 55.26 | |
| 1993 | World Indoor Championships | Toronto, Canada | 7th (h) | 400 m | 52.73 | NR |
| 1994 | European Indoor Championships | Paris, France | 5th | 800 m | 2:03.59 | |
| 1994 | European Championships | Helsinki, Finland | 18th (h) | 800 m | 2:04.96 | |
| 1995 | Summer Universiade | Fukuoka, Japan | 5th (sf) | 800 m | 2:03.95 | |
| 1997 | World Championships | Athens, Greece | 15th (sf) | 400 m hurdles | 56.17 | (Note: Goossen set a national record of 54.84 s in round 1.) |
| 1998 | European Indoor Championships | Valencia, Spain | 4th | 400 m | 51.82 | NR |
| 1998 | European Championships | Budapest, Hungary | 5th | 400 m hurdles | 54.62 | NR |
| 1999 | World Indoor Championships | Maebashi, Japan | 8th (sf) | 400 m | 52.09 | |
