= Susan Andrews =

Australian sprinter (born 1971)

Susan Elizabeth Andrews (born 26 May 1971 in Hobart, Tasmania) is an Australian retired athlete who mostly competed in the 400 metres. She represented her country at two Summer Olympics, in 1992 and 2000.

She has personal bests of 51.55 seconds in the 400 metres (Melbourne 1998) and 2:00.32 minutes in the 800 metres (Brisbane 2000).

== Competition record ==
Year	Competition	Venue	Position	Event	Notes
Representing Australia
1988	World Junior Championships	Sudbury, Canada	21st (sf)	400m	55.82
1988	World Junior Championships	Sudbury, Canada	13th (h)	4×400m relay	3:47.58
1990	Commonwealth Games	Auckland, New Zealand	10th (h)	400 m	54.77
1990	Commonwealth Games	Auckland, New Zealand	2nd	4 × 400 m relay	3:30.74
1990	World Junior Championships	Plovdiv, Bulgaria	4th	400 m	52.23
1990	World Junior Championships	Plovdiv, Bulgaria	1st	4 × 400 m relay	3:30.38
1992	Olympic Games	Barcelona, Spain	7th	4 × 400 m relay	3:26.42
1998	Commonwealth Games	Kuala Lumpur, Malaysia	10th (sf)	400 m	52.65
1998	Commonwealth Games	Kuala Lumpur, Malaysia	1st	4 × 400 m relay	3:27.28
1999	World Indoor Championships	Maebashi, Japan	13th (h)	400 m	52.65
1999	World Indoor Championships	Maebashi, Japan	2nd	4 × 400 m relay	3:26.87
1999	World Championships	Seville, Spain	23rd (h)	400 m	52.05
1999	World Championships	Seville, Spain	6th	4 × 400 m relay	3:28.04
2000	Olympic Games	Sydney, Australia	24th (h)	800 m	2:03.31
2000	Olympic Games	Sydney, Australia	3rd (h)	4 × 400 m relay	3:24.05
