= 1986 WAAA Championships =

British athletics event

- Dates: 6–7 June
- Host city: Birmingham
- Venue: Alexander Stadium
- Level: Senior
- Type: Outdoor

The 1986 WAAA Championships sponsored by the Trustee Savings Bank, were the national track and field championships for women in the United Kingdom.

The event was held at the Alexander Stadium, Birmingham, from 6 to 7 June 1986.

== Results ==
Event	Gold		Silver		Bronze	
100 metres	Paula Dunn	11.34	Heather Oakes	11.36	Pippa Windle	11.52
200 metres	Simmone Jacobs	23.34	Jennifer Stoute	23.51	Helen Barnett	23.61
400 metres	Kathy Cook	53.50	Angela Piggford	54.10	Jane Parry	54.28
800 metres	Diane Edwards	2:04.26	Lorraine Baker	2:04.93	Helen Thorpe	2:05.14
1,500 metres	Zola Budd	4:01.93	(Scotland) Christine Whittingham	4:10.10	(Scotland) Yvonne Murray	4:10.17
3,000 metres	Christine Benning	9:05.13	Jane Shields	9:05.13	Ruth Partridge	9:11.86
5,000 metres	Marina Samy	16:22.36	Alison Hollington	16:28.32	Shireen Samy	16:30.38
10,000 metres	Jill Clarke	33:27.69	Marina Samy	33:28.66	Debbie Peel	33:34.77
marathon+	Ann Ford	2:31:40	Paula Fudge	2:32:25	Julia Gates	2:36:31
100 metres hurdles	Sally Gunnell	13.13	Lesley-Ann Skeete	13.2	Wendy Jeal	13.27
400 metres hurdles	Yvette Wray	59.11	Aileen Mills	59.26	Carol Dawkins	59.55
High jump	Diana Davies	1.80	Three–way tie^	1.80	n/a	
Long jump	Mary Berkeley	6.35	Joyce Oladapo	6.27	Sharon Bowie	6.24
Shot put	Judy Oakes	18.70	Myrtle Augee	17.17	Yvonne Hanson-Nortey	15.93
Discus throw	Kathryn Farr	51.20	Jane Aucott	50.06	Karen Pugh	49.78
Javelin	Fatima Whitbread	69.02	Anna Lockton	55.00	Karen Hough	51.98
Heptathlon ++	(New Zealand) Terri Genge	5547	Marcia Marriott	5538	Jackie Kinsella	5391
5,000 metres walk	Helen Elleker	24:27.17	Lisa Langford	24:55.01	Sarah Brown	25:03.83
10,000 metres walk	Helen Elleker	49:21.8	Sarah Brown	52:25.0	Brenda Lupton	52:59.6

- + 1986 London Marathon (Best placed British athletes)
- ++ Held on 21 & 22 June at Hull
- ^ Three–way tie between (Northern Ireland) Sharon McPeake, Claire Summerfield and Marion Hughes

== See also ==
- 1986 AAA Championships
