= Athletics at the 1989 Summer Universiade – Women's 4 × 400 metres relay =

The women's 4 × 400 metres relay event at the 1989 Summer Universiade was held at the Wedaustadion in Duisburg with the final on 30 August 1989.

== Results ==
Rank	Nation	Athletes	Time	Notes
1st place, gold medalist(s)	United States	Celena Mondie, Natasha Kaiser, Jearl Miles, Terri Dendy	3:26.48	
2nd place, silver medalist(s)	West Germany	Linda Kisabaka, Karin Janke, Gabriela Lesch, Helga Arendt	3:27.02	
3rd place, bronze medalist(s)	Soviet Union	Yelena Vinogradova, Margarita Ponomaryova, Yelena Golesheva, Lyudmila Dzhigalova	3:28.60	
4	Cuba	Marbelis Figueredo, Nelsa Vinent, Nancy McLeón, Ana Fidelia Quirot	3:34.53	
5	France	Florence Moulineau, Christine Jaunin, Juliette Mato, Marie-Noëlle Bonvarlet	3:35.45	
6	Italy	Maria Luisa Climbini, Francesca Carbone, Brigitte Wielander, Irmgard Trojer	3:37.40	
