= 1998 European Athletics Championships – Women's 400 metres hurdles =

Women's 400 metres hurdles at the European Athletics Championships
- Venue: Népstadion
- Location: Budapest, Hungary
- Dates: 19 August 1998 (round 1); 21 August 1998 (final)
- Competitors: 24 from 18 nations
- Winning time: 53.37 s NR

Medalists
| gold medal | Ionela Târlea | Romania |
| silver medal | Tetyana Tereshchuk | Ukraine |
| bronze medal | Silvia Rieger | Germany |

The women's 400 metres hurdles at the 1998 European Athletics Championships was held at the Népstadion in Budapest, Hungary, on 19 and 21 August 1998.

== Results ==
=== Round 1 ===
The first two athletes in each heat (Q) and the next two fastest athletes overall (q) advanced to the final.

Results of round 1
| Rank | Heat | Athlete | Nation | Time | Notes |
|---|---|---|---|---|---|
| 1 | 1 | Silvia Rieger | Germany | 54.50 | Q, SB |
| 2 | 1 | Tetyana Tereshchuk | Ukraine | 54.65 | Q |
| 3 | 1 | Ester Goossens | Netherlands | 54.85 | q, SB |
| 4 | 2 | Ionela Târlea | Romania | 54.89 | Q |
| 5 | 2 | Guðrún Arnardóttir | Iceland | 55.21 | Q, SB |
| 6 | 2 | Ulrike Urbansky | Germany | 55.63 | q, PB |
| 7 | 3 | Susan Smith | Ireland | 55.65 | Q |
| 8 | 3 | Anna Knoroz | Russia | 55.68 | Q |
| 9 | 2 | Yekaterina Bakhvalova | Russia | 55.69 | |
| 10 | 3 | Judit Szekeres | Hungary | 55.86 | |
| 11 | 1 | Petra Söderström | Finland | 56.23 | PB |
| 12 | 3 | Gesine Schmidt | Germany | 56.40 | |
| 13 | 2 | Frida Svensson | Sweden | 56.55 | SB |
| 14 | 3 | Monika Niederstätter | Italy | 56.74 | |
| 15 | 1 | Tatyana Kurochkina | Belarus | 57.05 | |
| 16 | 3 | Tasha Danvers | Great Britain | 57.19 | |
| 17 | 1 | Meta Mačus | Slovenia | 57.28 | |
| 18 | 2 | Ann Mercken | Belgium | 57.39 | |
| 19 | 2 | Lara Rocco | Italy | 57.51 | |
| 20 | 3 | Mari Bjone | Norway | 58.13 | |
| 21 | 1 | Yuliya Nosova | Russia | 58.26 | |
| 22 | 2 | Rikke Rønholt | Denmark | 58.55 | |
| 23 | 1 | Orsolya Dóczi | Hungary | 58.76 | |
| 24 | 3 | Florence Delaune | France | 59.01 | |

=== Final ===
Results of the final
| Rank | Athlete | Nation | Time | Notes |
|---|---|---|---|---|
| 1st place, gold medalist(s) | Ionela Târlea | Romania | 53.37 | NR |
| 2nd place, silver medalist(s) | Tetyana Tereshchuk | Ukraine | 54.07 | |
| 3rd place, bronze medalist(s) | Silvia Rieger | Germany | 54.45 | SB |
| 4 | Guðrún Arnardóttir | Iceland | 54.59 | NR |
| 5 | Ester Goossens | Netherlands | 54.62 | NR |
| 6 | Ulrike Urbansky | Germany | 55.38 | PB |
| 7 | Anna Knoroz | Russia | 55.47 | |
| 8 | Susan Smith | Ireland | 55.61 | |
