= 1985 Pacific Conference Games =

V Pacific Conference Games
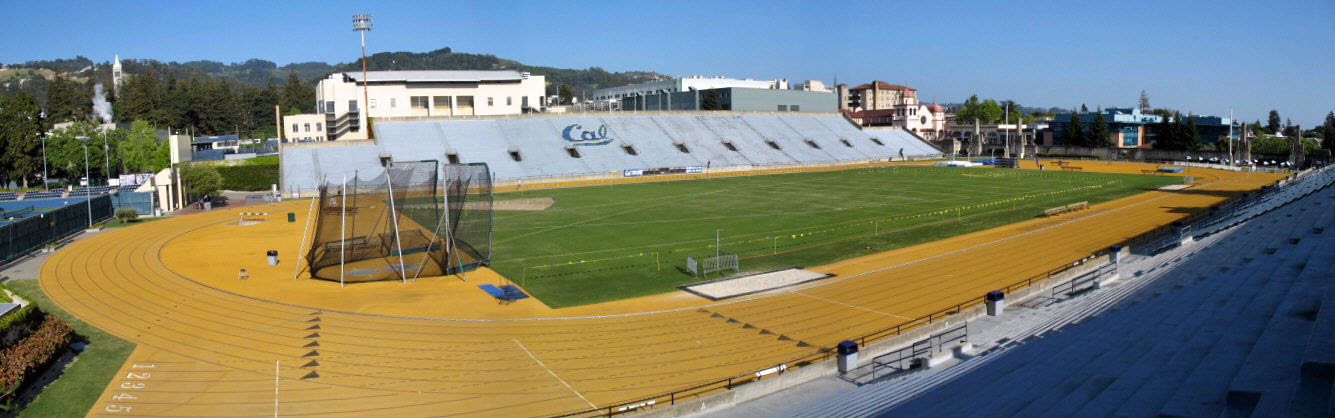
- The host stadium
- Dates: 22–23 June
- Host city: Berkeley, California, United States
- Venue: Edwards Stadium
- Events: 37

The 1985 Pacific Conference Games was the fifth and final edition of the international athletics competition between five Pacific coast nations: Australia, Canada, Japan, New Zealand and the United States. Like the 1981 edition before it, athletes from beyond the Pacific grouping were allowed to compete at the tournament. A total of 21 men's and 16 women's athletics events were contested. One change was made to the event programme: the women's pentathlon was dropped in favour of the heptathlon, mirroring the same change in the Olympic programme which had happened at the 1984 Los Angeles Olympics.

The competition was held at the Edwards Stadium in Berkeley, California, with the United States being the last nation of the five original invited nations to fulfil its duty in hosting the meeting. Sports television channel ESPN broadcast highlights of the competition nationally.

== Medal summary ==
=== Men ===
Event	Gold		Silver		Bronze	
100 metres	Emmit King (USA)	10.44	Lee McNeill (USA)	10.45	Rick Jones (CAN)	10.56
200 metres	Harvey McSwain (USA)	20.83	Courtney Brown (CAN)	21.17	Mike Dwyer (CAN)	21.32
400 metres	Andrew Valmon (USA)	45.64	Susumu Takano (JPN)	45.95	Cedric Vaughans (USA)	46.12
800 metres	Ocky Clark (USA)	1:46.01	Peter Pearless (NZL)	1:46.97	Simon Hoogewerf (CAN)	1:47.36
1500 metres	Dave Campbell (CAN)	3:44.25	Peter Bourke (AUS)	3:45.13	Craig Masback (USA)	3:45.44
5000 metres	Rob Lonergan (CAN)	13:54.00	Tsukasa Endo (JPN)	13:54.45	Brad Erickstad (USA)	14:00.45
10,000 metres	Peter Butler (CAN)	28:53.1	Rex Wilson (NZL)	29:07.0	Paul Gorman (USA)	29:21.0
110 m hurdles	Alex Washington (USA)	13.5w	Tom Wilcher (USA)	13.6w	Jeff Glass (CAN)	13.7w
400 m hurdles	Nat Page (USA)	49.56	John Graham (CAN)	50.11	Tony Valentine (USA)	50.30
3000 metres steeplechase	Peter Renner (NZL)	8:28.33	Graeme Fell (CAN)	8:40.67	Hideki Mieda (JPN)	8:41.79
4 × 100 m relay	United States (USA); Lee McNeill; Emmit King; Greg Moore; Harvey McSwain	39.30	Australia (AUS); Neil Honey; Clayton Kearney; Miles Murphy; Robert Stone	40.28	Japan (JPN); Hirofumi Miyazaki; Koichi Mishiba; Koji Kurihara; Hiromi Kawagumi	40.40
4 × 400 m relay	United States (USA)	3:03.70	Japan (JPN)	3:05.76	Australia (AUS); Ken Gordon; Dale Horrobin; Miles Murphy; Robert Stone	3:09.80
High jump	Jim Howard (USA)	2.31 m	Brian Stanton (USA)	2.27 m	Shuji Ujino (JPN)	2.18 m
Pole vault	Steve Stubblefield (USA)	5.40 m	Neil Honey (AUS)	5.20 m	Toshiyuki Hashioka (JPN)	5.20 m
Long jump	Mike McRae (USA)	7.82w m	Junichi Usui (JPN)	7.69 m	Steve Walsh (NZL)	7.46 m
Triple jump	Willie Banks (USA)	17.07 m	Yasushi Ueta (JPN)	16.36 m	Matt Sweeney (AUS)	15.81 m
Shot put	Jesse Stuart (USA)	20.24 m	Luby Chambul (CAN)	17.66 m	Henry Smith (NZL)	16.96 m
Discus throw	Art Swarts (USA)	59.48 m	Ray Lazdins (CAN)	58.20 m	Paul Nandapi (AUS)	57.98 m
Hammer throw	Dave McKenzie (USA)	69.62 m	Hans Lotz (AUS)	68.24 m	Joe Quigley (AUS)	67.52 m
Javelin throw	John Stapylton-Smith (NZL)	87.28 m	Mike Mahovlich (CAN)	83.46 m	Craig Christianson (USA)	82.80 m
Decathlon	Dave Steen (CAN)	8109 pts	Greg Haydenluck (CAN)	7562 pts	Simon Poelman (NZL)	7553 pts

=== Women ===
Event	Gold		Silver		Bronze	
100 metres	Michelle Finn (USA)	11.63	Angela Phipps (CAN)	11.77	Katherine Wallace (USA)	11.79
200 metres	Gwen Torrence (USA)	23.57	Maree Chapman (AUS)	23.59	Ella Smith (USA)	23.63
400 metres	Lillie Leatherwood (USA)	51.06	Maree Chapman (AUS)	51.72	Tonya McIntosh (USA)	52.64
800 metres	Renée Bélanger (CAN)	2:02.45	Veronica McIntosh (USA)	2:03.45	Bronwyn Fleming (AUS)	2:04.15
1500 metres	Sue Foster (USA)	4:09.36	Anne McKenzie (NZL)	4:11.61	Penny Just (AUS)	4:14.77
3000 metres	Sharon Dalton (AUS)	9:06.53	Sue Lee (CAN)	9:07.55	Christine Pfitzinger (NZL)	9:08.95
100 m hurdles	Stephanie Hightower (USA)	13.34	Sylvia Forgrave (CAN)	13.61	Lyn Stock (NZL)	13.67
400 m hurdles	Schowonda Williams (USA)	56.85	Gwen Wall (CAN)	57.64	Lyn Grime (NZL)	57.87
4 × 100 m relay	United States (USA); Tonya McIntosh; Michelle Finn; Gwen Torrence; Ella Smith	44.25	Canada (CAN); Esmie Lawrence; Fay Blackwood; Angela Phipps; Carol Galloway	44.76	Australia (AUS); Jenny Flaherty; Jane Flemming; Maree Chapman; Kerry Johnson	45.00
4 × 400 m relay	United States (USA); Roberta Belle; Susan Shurr; Michelle Maxey; Tonya McIntosh	3:28.20	Australia (AUS); Jenny Flaherty; Bronwyn Fleming; Maree Chapman; Debbie Tomsett	3:33.40	Canada (CAN)	3:35.49
High jump	Deann Bopf (AUS)	1.90 m	Coleen Sommer (USA)	1.90 m	Megumi Sato (JPN)	1.87 m
Long jump	Carol Lewis (USA)	6.63 m	Carol Galloway (CAN)	6.37 m	Minako Isogai (JPN)	6.23 m
Shot put	Ramona Pagel (USA)	18.40 m	Gael Martin (AUS)	16.05 m	Sue Reinwald (AUS)	15.68 m
Discus throw	Penny Neer (USA)	61.36 m	Sue Reinwald (AUS)	57.30 m	Gale Dolegiewicz (CAN)	54.24 m
Javelin throw	Cathy Sulinski (USA)	57.20 m	Céline Chartrand (CAN)	57.04 m	Laurie Schultz (CAN)	55.70 m
Heptathlon	Jocelyn Millar-Cubit (AUS)	5838 pts	Donna Smellie (CAN)	5773 pts	Terry Genge (NZL)	5451 pts
