= Gail Luke =

Australian hurdler

Personal information
- Nationality: Australian
- Born: 25 May 1963 (age 63)

Sport
- Sport: Track and field
- Event: 400 metres hurdles

Gail Luke (née Millar; born 25 May 1963) is an Australian hurdler. She competed in the women's 400 metres hurdles at the 1992 Summer Olympics.
