= Patrizia Spuri =

Italian athletics competitor

Personal information
- Nationality: Italian
- Born: 18 February 1973 (age 53) Fara in Sabina, Italy
- Height: 1.73 m (5 ft 8 in)
- Weight: 60 kg (132 lb)

Sport
- Country: Italy
- Sport: Athletics
- Event: 400 metres
- Club: G.S. Forestale

Achievements and titles
- Personal bests: 400 m: 51"74 (1998); 800 m: 1'59"96 (1998)
Medal record
European Indoor Championships
Silver medal – second place	2000 Ghent	4x400 m relay
Bronze medal – third place	2002 Vienna	4x400 m relay
Mediterranean Games
Gold medal – first place	1997 Bari	4x400 m relay
Bronze medal – third place	1997 Bari	400 m

Patrizia Spuri (born 18 February 1973 in Fara in Sabina) is an Italian former sprinter (400 m) and middle-distance runner (800 m).

In her career she won 9 times the national championships. She is married to the triple jumper Fabrizio Donato.

== National records ==
- 4x400 metres relay: 3'26"69 ( (France) Paris, 20 June 1999) - with Virna De Angeli, Francesca Carbone, Danielle Perpoli
- 4x400 metres relay indoor: 3'35"01 ( (Belgium) Ghent, 27 February 2000) - with Virna De Angeli, Francesca Carbone, Carla Barbarino

== Achievements ==
Year	Competition	Venue	Position	Event	Notes
Representing Italy
1992	World Junior Championships	Seoul, South Korea	19th (h)	400m	55.85
1994	European Championships	Helsinki, Finland	24th (h)	400m	54.35
1994	European Championships	Helsinki, Finland	10th (h)	4 × 400 m relay	3:33.31
1997	World Championships	Athens, Greece	8th	4x400 metres relay	3'30"63
1999	World Championships	Seville, Spain	8th	4x400 metres relay	3'29"56
2000	European Indoor Championships	Ghent, Belgium	2nd	4x400 metres relay	3'35"01 NR
2002	European Indoor Championships	Vienna, Austria	3rd	4x400 metres relay	3'36"49

== National titles ==
- 4 wins in 400 metres at the Italian Athletics Championships (1994, 1996, 1997, 1998)
- 1 win in 800 metres at the Italian Athletics Championships (1999)
- 2 wins in 400 metres at the Italian Athletics Indoor Championships (1994, 1998)
- 1 win in 800 metres at the Italian Athletics Indoor Championships (2000)

== See also ==
- Italian all-time top lists - 400 metres
- Italian all-time top lists - 800 metres
