= Jane Parry =

British athlete

Personal information
- Nationality: British (English)
- Born: 15 November 1964 (age 61) Ellesmere Port, Cheshire

Sport
- Sport: Athletics
- Event(s): 200m, 400m
- Club: Trafford AC
Medal record
Athletics
Representing England
Commonwealth Games
Silver medal – second place	1986 Edinburgh	4x400m

Jane Louise Parry (born 15 November 1964) is a female former track and field athlete who competed for England in the 400 metres.

== Biography ==
Parry attended The Whitby High School, and lived at 2 Woodland Road. She was sponsored by BNFL at Capenhurst. She had six months in Tucson at the University of Arizona on an athletics scholarship. She went to Chester College.

Parry finished third behind Michelle Scutt in the 200 metres event at the 1983 WAAA Championships.

At the 1984 Olympic Games in Los Angeles, she represented Great Britain flying in as a late addition to the team, but was told that she was not in the team three days before the race.

Parry finished third behind Kathy Cook in the 400 metres event at the 1986 WAAA Championships and the following month represented England in the 4 x 400 metres relay event with Kathy Cook, Linda Keough and Angela Piggford, at the 1986 Commonwealth Games in Edinburgh, Scotland.

By 1989 she was called Jane Wedgewood.
