= Francesca Carbone =

Italian sprinter (born 1968)

Personal information
- Nationality: Italian
- Born: 17 July 1968 (age 58) Genoa, Italy
- Height: 1.69 m (5 ft 6 1/2 in)
- Weight: 65 kg (143 lb)

Sport
- Country: Italy
- Sport: Athletics
- Event: 400 metres
- Club: Snam Gas Metano

Achievements and titles
- Personal best: 400 m: 53.01 (2000)
Medal record
European Indoor Championships
Silver medal – second place	2000 Ghent	4x400 m relay
Mediterranean Games
Gold medal – first place	1997 Bari	4x400 m relay
Silver medal – second place	2001 Tunis	4x400 m relay
Bronze medal – third place	1993 Narbonne	400 m

Francesca Carbone (born 17 July 1968 in Genoa) is an Italian former sprinter (400 m).

== Biography ==
In her career, she won 4 times in the national championships. She has 35 caps in the national team from 1989 to 2001.

== National records ==
- 4x400 metres relay: 3'26"69 ( (France) Paris, 20 June 1999) - with Virna De Angeli, Patrizia Spuri, Danielle Perpoli
- 4x400 metres relay indoor: 3'35"01 ( (Belgium) Ghent, 27 February 2000) - with Virna De Angeli, Patrizia Spuri, Carla Barbarino

== Achievements ==
Year	Competition	Venue	Position	Event	Notes
Representing Italy
1989	Universiade	Duisburg, West Germany	6th	4 × 400 m relay	3:37.40
1993	Mediterranean Games	Narbonne, France	3rd	400 metres	53.78
1994	European Championships	Helsinki, Finland	10th (h)	4 × 400 m relay	3:33.31
1997	World Championships	Athens, Greece	8th	4x400 metres relay	3:30.63
1997	Mediterranean Games	Bari, Italy	1st	4x400 metres relay	3:29.98
1999	World Championships	Sevilla, Spain	8th	4x400 metres relay	3:29.56
2000	European Indoor Championships	Ghent, Belgium	2nd	4x400 metres relay	3:35.01
2001	Mediterranean Games	Tunis, Tunisia	2nd	4x400 metres relay	3'38"90

== National titles ==
- 1 win on 400 metres at the Italian Athletics Championships (1993)
- 3 wins on 400 metres at the Italian Athletics Indoor Championships (1993, 1995, 2000)
