= Alina Rîpanu =

Romanian sprinter (born 1981)

Personal information
- Born: 29 October 1981 (age 43) Târgu Neamț, Romania
- Height: 1.81 m (5 ft 11 in)

Sport
- Event(s): 400 metres 4 × 400 metres relay
- Club: SCM Bacău; CS Dynamo Bucureşti

Alina Rîpanu (born 29 October 1981) is a Romanian sprinter who specialized in the 400 metres. Her most significant achievements were bronze medals in the 4 × 400 metres relay at the 2000 European Indoor Championships and 2004 World Indoor Championships.

== Individual achievements ==
In age-specific competitions, Rîpanu won the silver medal at the 1997 European Junior Championships and finished fourth at the 1998 World Junior Championships.

She competed at the 1998 European Championships and the 1999 World Indoor Championships without reaching the final, and won the 1999 Balkan Indoor Championships. In 2000 she won the Balkan Junior Championships in both 400 and 800 metres, and competed in the 800 metres at the 2000 European Indoor Championships as well as finishing fourth at the 2000 World Junior Championships. After competing sparingly in 2001 and 2002, she finished sixth in the 800 metres at the 2003 European U23 Championships.

She won the 400 m bronze medal at the 2004 Balkan Indoor Championships and finished fourth at the 2005 Balkan Indoor Championships. Rîpanu also competed in several European Cup Super League meets. Domestically, she became Romanian champion in 1999, 2004 and 2005 and Romanian indoor champion in 1999, as well as numerous other medals.

Her personal best times were 52.64 seconds in the 400 metres, achieved indoors in March 1999 in Maebashi; and 2:01.96 minutes in the 800 metres, achieved in May 1999 in Constanta. She was a part of the Romanian record team in the 4 × 400 metres relay which ran in 3:25.68 minutes in June 1999 in Paris. The bronze medal team at the 2004 World Indoor Championships also set the Romanian indoor record.

== Relay ==
In age-specific competitions, Rîpanu was a part of Romanian teams that finished sixth at the 1997 European Junior Championships and fifth at the 1998 World Junior Championships. She helped finish fourth at the 1998 European Championships and then won bronze medals at both the 2000 World Junior Championships and the 2000 European Indoor Championships.

In 2004 she helped win a bronze medal at the 2004 World Indoor Championships, before competing at the 2004 Olympic Games and the 2005 World Championships without reaching the final.
