= Helena Fuchsová =

Czech runner (1965–2021)

Personal information
- Nationality: Czech
- Born: 3 June 1965 Tábor, Czechoslovakia
- Died: 14 March 2021 (aged 55)
- Height: 1.70 m (5 ft 7 in)
- Weight: 57 kg (126 lb)

Sport
- Sport: Athletics
- Events: 400m, 800m
Medal record
Women's athletics
Representing Czech Republic
World Indoor Championships
Silver medal – second place	1995 Barcelona	4×400m
Bronze medal – third place	1997 Paris	400m
Bronze medal – third place	2001 Lisbon	800m
European Championships
Silver medal – second place	1998 Budapest	400 m
European Indoor Championships
Bronze medal – third place	1998 Valencia	400 m
Bronze medal – third place	2000 Ghent	400m

Helena Fuchsová, née Helena Dziurová, (3 June 1965 – 14 March 2021) was a Czech runner who specialized in the 400 and 800 m events. She retired from athletics in 2004.

== Competition record ==
Year	Competition	Venue	Position	Event	Notes
Representing Czechoslovakia
1991	World Indoor Championships	Seville, Spain	13th (h)	800 m	2:07.58
Representing Czech Republic
1994	European Championships	Helsinki, Finland	5th (h)	4 × 400 m	3:30.91
1995	World Indoor Championships	Barcelona, Spain	9th (sf)	400 m	53.18
1995	World Indoor Championships	Barcelona, Spain	2nd	4 × 400 m	3:30.27
1996	European Indoor Championships	Stockholm, Sweden	3rd (B)	400 m	52.37
1996	Olympic Games	Atlanta, United States	20th (qf)	400 m	51.70
1996	Olympic Games	Atlanta, United States	7th	4 × 400 m	3:26.99
1997	World Indoor Championships	Paris, France	3rd	400 m	52.04
1997	World Indoor Championships	Paris, France	4th	4 × 400 m	3:28.47
1997	World Championships	Athens, Greece	6th	400 m	50.66
1997	World Championships	Athens, Greece	5th	4 × 400 m	3:23.73
1998	European Indoor Championships	Valencia, Spain	3rd	400 m	51.22
1998	European Championships	Budapest, Hungary	3rd	400 m	50.21
1998	European Championships	Budapest, Hungary	5th	4 × 400 m	3:27.54
1999	World Championships	Seville, Spain	4th	4 × 400 m	3:23.82
2000	European Indoor Championships	Ghent, Belgium	3rd	400 m	52.32
2000	Olympic Games	Sydney, Australia	5th	800 m	1:58.56
2000	Olympic Games	Sydney, Australia	7th	4 × 400 m	3:29.17
2001	World Indoor Championships	Lisbon, Portugal	3rd	800 m	2:01.18

== Personal bests ==
Outdoor

- 200m 23.29 (Prague 1997)
- 400m 50.21 (Budapest 1998)
- 800m 1:58.56 (Sydney 2000)

Indoor

- 200m 24.06 (Prague 2000)
- 400m 50.99 (Liévin 1998)
- 800m 1:58.37 (Liévin 2001)
