= Sandra Whittaker =

British sprinter (born 1963)

Personal information
- Born: 29 January 1963 (age 63) Bellshill, Scotland

Sport
- Sport: Athletics
- Event: Sprinting
- Club: Glasgow Athletics Club
Medal record
Representing Scotland
Commonwealth Games
| Bronze medal – third place | 1982 Brisbane | 4 × 400 metres relay |
| Bronze medal – third place | 1986 Edinburgh | 200 metres |

Alexandra "Sandra" Whittaker (born 29 January 1963) is a British sprinter. She competed in the women's 200 metres at the 1984 Summer Olympics. She competed at the Commonwealth Games for Scotland and won bronze medals at the 1982 games in the 4 × 400 metres relay event and at the 1986 games in the 200 metres event. She also competed at the 1983 World Championships in Athletics and the 1986 European Athletics Championships and won seven Scottish titles.
