= Shanelle Porter =

American sprinter

Personal information
- Born: January 20, 1972 (age 54) Vallejo, California, U.S.
Medal record
Women's athletics (track and field)
Representing United States
World Indoor Championships
Silver medal – second place	1997 Paris	4x400 m relay
Bronze medal – third place	1999 Maebashi	4x400 m relay
Pan American Games
Silver medal – second place	1999 Winnipeg	4x400m relay

Shanelle Porter (born January 20, 1972) is a retired American sprinter who specialized in the 400 metres.

Representing the Nebraska Cornhuskers track and field team, Porter won the 1991 NCAA Division I Outdoor Track and Field Championships in the 4 × 400 m relay.

Her personal best time is 50.67 seconds, achieved in July 1996 in Lignano, Italy.

== Achievements ==
Year	Competition	Venue	Position	Event	Notes
Representing the United States
1990	World Junior Championships	Plovdiv, Bulgaria	22nd (h)	400m	56.63
1997	World Indoor Championships	Paris, France	2nd	4 × 400 m relay	3:27.66 ARi
1999	World Indoor Championships	Maebashi, Japan	3rd	4 × 400 m relay	3:27.59 ARi
