= Carla Barbarino =

Italian former sprinter and hurdler

Personal information
- Nationality: Italian
- Born: 16 May 1967 (age 59) Lodi, Italy
- Height: 1.68 m (5 ft 6 in)
- Weight: 53 kg (117 lb)

Sport
- Country: Italy
- Sport: Athletics
- Event(s): 400 metres 400 metres hurdles
- Club: Snam Gas Metano

Achievements and titles
- Personal bests: 400 m: 53.82 (1997); 400 m hs: 56.66 (1997)
Medal record
European Indoor Championships
Silver medal – second place	2000 Ghent	4x400 m relay
Bronze medal – third place	2002 Vienna	4x400 m relay
Mediterranean Games
Gold medal – first place	1997 Bari	4x400 m relay
Bronze medal – third place	1997 Bari	400 m hs

Carla Barbarino (born on 16 May 1967) is an Italian former sprinter (400 m) and hurdler (400 m hs).

== Biography ==
Barbarino was born on 16 May 1967 in Lodi, Italy. She won the national championships four times. She has been the coach of Italian hurdler Manuela Gentili since 2004.

== National records ==
- 4x400 metres relay indoor: 3'35"01 ( (Belgium) Ghent, 27 February 2000) - with Virna De Angeli, Francesca Carbone, Patrizia Spuri

== Achievements ==
Year	Competition	Venue	Position	Event	Performance	Notes
1997	Mediterranean Games	(Italy) Bari	3rd	400 metres hurdles	56.76	
1997	Mediterranean Games	(Italy) Bari	1st	4x400 metres relay	3:29.98	Championship record
2000	European Indoor Championships	(Belgium) Ghent	2nd	4x400 metres relay	3:35.01	
2002	European Indoor Championships	(Austria) Vienna	3rd	4x400 metres relay	3:36.49	

== National titles ==
- 2 wins in 400 metres hurdles at the Italian Athletics Championships (1989, 1996)
- 2 wins in 400 metres at the Italian Athletics Indoor Championships (1994, 1998)

== See also ==
- Italian all-time top lists - 400 metres hurdles
