= Rossana Morabito =

Italian athletics competitor

Personal information
- Nationality: Italian
- Born: 21 September 1969 (age 56) Cagliari, Italy

Sport
- Country: Italy
- Sport: Athletics
- Event(s): 400 metres 800 metres
- Club: Snia Milano

Achievements and titles
- Personal bests: 400 m: 53.66 (1989); 800 m: 2:03.12 (1989)
Medal record
Gymnasiade
| Gold medal – first place | 1984 Florence | 800 metres |

Rossana Morabito (born 21 September 1969) is an Italian female retired sprinter (400 m) and middle-distance runner (800 m), who competed at the 1987 World Championships in Athletics.

== Biography ==
At just 19 years old, Rosanna was selected for the absolute world championship. Despite being part of the junior category, she went onto win four absolute national titles. However, due to a serious injury, her sporting career ended prematurely.

== Achievements ==
| Year | Competition | Venue | Position | Event | Time | Notes |
|---|---|---|---|---|---|---|
| 1987 | World Championships | (Italy) Rome | Semi | 4x400 metres relay | 3:31.72 | |
| 1988 | World Junior Championships | (Canada) Sudbury | 8th | 400 metres | 55.20 | |
| 1990 | European Indoor Championships | (United Kingdom) Glasgow | Semi | 800 metres | 2:07.18 | |

== National titles ==
She won four times the national championships at senior level.

- Italian Athletics Championships
  - 400 metres: 1988, 1989
- Italian Athletics Indoor Championships
  - 800 metres: 1989, 1990
