= Danielle Perpoli =

Italian sprinter

Personal information
- Nationality: Italian
- Born: 7 March 1968 (age 58) Melbourne, Australia
- Height: 1.68 m (5 ft 6 in)
- Weight: 59 kg (130 lb)

Sport
- Country: Italy
- Sport: Athletics
- Event: 400 metres
- Club: SAI Assicurazioni

Achievements and titles
- Personal bests: 200 m: 23.06 (1999); 400 m: 51.85 (2002)
Medal record
European Indoor Championships
Bronze medal – third place	2002 Vienna	4x400 m relay
Mediterranean Games
Silver medal – second place	2001 Tunis	4x100 m relay
Silver medal – second place	2001 Tunis	4x400 m relay
European Cup
Bronze medal – third place	2002 Annecy	4x400 m relay

Danielle Perpoli (Melbourne, 7 March 1968) is an Italian former sprinter (400 m).

== Biography ==
In her career she won gold medals at the Italian Athletics Championships on four occasions, with two victories in the 200m and two in the 400m events. She also won a gold medal at the Italian Athletics Indoor Championships in the 400m event.

== National records ==
- 4x400 metres relay: 3'26"69 ( (France) Paris, 20 June 1999) – with Virna De Angeli, Francesca Carbone, Patrizia Spuri

== Achievements ==
Year	Competition	Venue	Position	Event	Notes
Representing Italy
1994	European Championships	Helsinki, Finland	22nd (h)	400m	53.81
1994	European Championships	Helsinki, Finland	10th (h)	4 × 400 m relay	3:33.31
2002	European Indoor Championships	Vienna, Austria	3rd	4x400 metres relay	3'36"49

== National titles ==
- 2 wins in 200 metres at the Italian Athletics Championships (1999, 2000)
- 2 wins in 400 metres at the Italian Athletics Championships (1995, 2002)
- 1 win in 400 metres at the Italian Athletics Indoor Championships (2002)

== See also ==
- Italian all-time top lists – 200 metres
- Italian all-time top lists – 400 metres
