= Slavica Živković =

Serbian politician

Slavica Živković (Serbian Cyrillic: Славица Живковић; born 1970) is a politician in Serbia. She has served in the National Assembly of Serbia since 19 July 2018 and in the Assembly of the City of Belgrade since 2012. Živković is a member of the Social Democratic Party of Serbia (SDPS).

== Private career ==
Živković has a master's degree in economics. She lives in the Belgrade municipality of Zemun and is president of the SDPS organization in that community.

== Political career ==
Živković joined the SDPS on its formation in 2008. The party contested the 2012 Belgrade local election on a coalition electoral list led by the Democratic Party. Živković was awarded the fifty-eighth position (out of 110) on the list, which won fifty mandates; some members elected ahead of her did not serve, and she received a mandate for the sitting of the assembly that followed.

After this election (and the concurrent 2012 Serbian parliamentary election), the SDPS ended its alliance with the Democratic Party and formed a new alliance with the Serbian Progressive Party. Živković received the thirty-seventh position on the Progressive-led list in the 2014 Belgrade city assembly election and the seventeenth position in the 2018 city assembly election. The lists won majorities on both occasions, and Živković was re-elected both times.

The SDPS contested the 2016 Serbian parliamentary election on the Progressive Party's Aleksandar Vučić — Future We Believe In list, and Živković received the 240th position (out of 250). This was too low for direct election to be a realistic possibility, and, although the list won a majority victory with 131 mandates, she was not initially elected. She was, however, awarded a mandate by the Republic Electoral Commission on 19 July 2018 as a replacement for Meho Omerović, who had resigned. The SDPS is part of Serbia's coalition government, and she serves as a supporter of the administration.
