= Athletics at the 1990 Commonwealth Games =

Athletics at the 14th Commonwealth Games
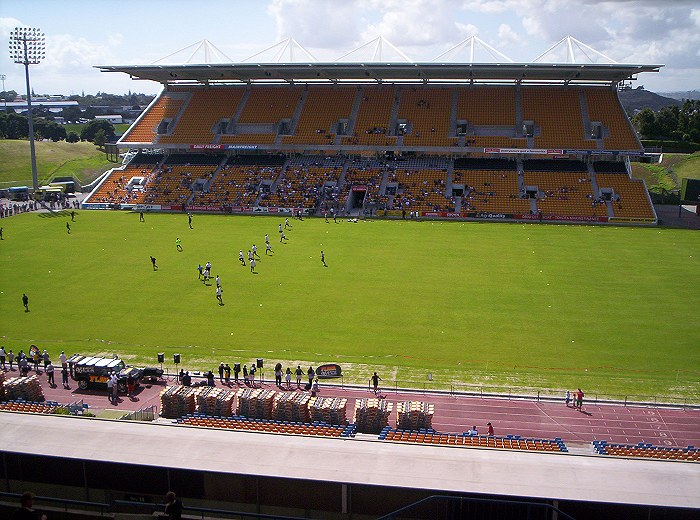
- Dates: 27 January – 3 February 1990
- Host city: Auckland, New Zealand
- Venue: Mount Smart Stadium
- Level: Senior
- Events: 42
- Participation: 585 athletes from 45 nations
- Records set: 6 Games records

At the 1990 Commonwealth Games, the athletics events were held at the Mount Smart Stadium in Auckland, New Zealand, from 27 January to 3 February 1990. A total of 42 events were contested, 23 by male and 19 by female athletes.

== Medal summary ==
=== Men ===
Event	Gold		Silver		Bronze	
100 metres (wind: +3.9 m/s)	Linford Christie (ENG)	9.93w	Davidson Ezinwa (NGR)	10.05w	Bruny Surin (CAN)	10.12w
200 metres (wind: +2.4 m/s)	Marcus Adam (ENG)	20.10w	John Regis (ENG)	20.16w	Ade Mafe (ENG)	20.26w
400 metres	Darren Clark (AUS)	44.60	Samson Kitur (KEN)	44.88	Simeon Kipkemboi (KEN)	44.93
800 metres	Sammy Tirop (KEN)	1:45.98	Nixon Kiprotich (KEN)	1:46.00	Matthew Yates (ENG)	1:46.62
1500 metres	Peter Elliott (ENG)	3:33.39	Wilfred Kirochi (KEN)	3:34.41	Peter O'Donoghue (NZL)	3:35.14
5000 metres	Andrew Lloyd (AUS)	13:24.86	John Ngugi (KEN)	13:24.94	Ian Hamer (WAL)	13:25.63
10,000 metres	Eamonn Martin (ENG)	28:08.57	Moses Tanui (KEN)	28:11.56	Paul Williams (CAN)	28:12.71
Marathon	Douglas Wakiihuri (KEN)	2:10:27	Steve Moneghetti (AUS)	2:10:34	Simon-Robert Naali (TAN)	2:10:38
110 metres hurdles	Colin Jackson (WAL)	13.08	Tony Jarrett (ENG)	13.34	David Nelson (ENG)	13.54
400 metres hurdles	Kriss Akabusi (ENG)	48.89	Gideon Yego (KEN)	49.25	John Graham (CAN)	50.24
3000 metres steeplechase	Julius Kariuki (KEN)	8:20.64	Joshua Kipkemboi (KEN)	8:24.26	Colin Walker (ENG)	8:26.50
4 × 100 metres relay	England; Clarence Callender; John Regis; Marcus Adam; Linford Christie; Tony Jarrett*	38.67	Nigeria; Victor Nwankwo; Davidson Ezinwa; Osmond Ezinwa; Abdullahi Tetengi	38.85	Jamaica; Wayne Watson; John Mair; Clive Wright; Ray Stewart	39.11
4 × 400 metres relay	Kenya; David Kitur; Samson Kitur; Simeon Kipkemboi; Stephen Mwanzia	3:02.48 GR	Scotland; Mark Davidson; David Strang; Tom McKean; Brian Whittle; Duncan Mathieson*	3:04.68	Jamaica; Clive Wright; Devon Morris; Trevor Graham; Howard Burnett; John Mair*	3:04.96
30 kilometres walk	Guillaume Leblanc (CAN)	2:08:28	Andrew Jachno (AUS)	2:09:09	Ian McCombie (ENG)	2:09:20
High jump	Clarence Saunders (BER)	2.36 m GR	Dalton Grant (ENG)	2.34 m	Milton Ottey (CAN); Geoff Parsons (SCO)	2.23 m
Pole vault	Simon Arkell (AUS)	5.35 m	Ian Tullett (ENG)	5.25 m	Simon Poelman (NZL)	5.20 m
Long jump	Yusuf Alli (NGR)	8.39 m (w)	David Culbert (AUS)	8.20 m (w)	Festus Igbinoghene (NGR)	8.18 m (w)
Triple jump	Marios Hadjiandreou (CYP)	16.95 m	Jonathan Edwards (ENG)	16.93 m	Edrick Floreal (CAN)	16.89 m
Shot put	Simon Williams (ENG)	18.54 m	Adewale Olukoju (NGR)	18.48 m	Paul Edwards (WAL)	18.17 m
Discus throw	Adewale Olukoju (NGR)	62.62 m	Werner Reiterer (AUS)	61.56 m	Paul Nandapi (AUS)	59.94 m
Hammer throw	Sean Carlin (AUS)	75.66 m	Dave Smith (ENG)	73.52 m	Angus Cooper (NZL)	71.26 m
Javelin throw	Steve Backley (ENG)	86.02 m GR	Mick Hill (ENG)	83.32 m	Gavin Lovegrove (NZL)	81.66 m
Decathlon	Mike Smith (CAN)	8525 pts	Simon Poelman (NZL)	8207 pts w	Eugene Gilkes (ENG)	7705 pts

=== Women ===
Event	Gold		Silver		Bronze	
100 metres (wind: +4.4 m/s)	Merlene Ottey (JAM)	11.02w	Kerry Johnson (AUS)	11.17w	Pauline Davis-Thompson (BAH)	11.20w
200 metres	Merlene Ottey (JAM)	22.76	Kerry Johnson (AUS)	22.88	Pauline Davis-Thompson (BAH)	23.15
400 metres	Fatima Yusuf (NGR)	51.08	Linda Keough (ENG)	51.63	Charity Opara (NGR)	52.01
800 metres	Diane Edwards (ENG)	2:00.25 GR	Ann Williams (ENG)	2:00.40	Sharon Stewart (AUS)	2:00.87
1500 metres	Angela Chalmers (CAN)	4:08.41	Christina Cahill (ENG)	4:08.71	Bev Nicholson (ENG)	4:09.00
3000 metres	Angela Chalmers (CAN)	8:38.38 GR	Yvonne Murray (SCO)	8:39.46	Liz McColgan (SCO)	8:47.66
10,000 metres	Liz McColgan (SCO)	32:23.56	Jill Hunter (ENG)	32:33.21	Barbara Moore (NZL)	32:44.73
Marathon	Lisa Martin (AUS)	2:25:28	Tani Ruckle (AUS)	2:33:15	Angie Pain (ENG)	2:36:35
100 metres hurdles	Kay Morley (WAL)	12.91	Sally Gunnell (ENG)	13.12	Lesley-Ann Skeete (ENG)	13.31
400 metres hurdles	Sally Gunnell (ENG)	55.38	Debbie Flintoff-King (AUS)	56.00	Jenny Laurendet (AUS)	56.74
4 × 100 metres relay	Australia; Monique Dunstan; Kathy Sambell; Cathy Freeman; Kerry Johnson	43.87	England; Stephi Douglas; Jenni Stoute; Simmone Jacobs; Paula Dunn	44.15	Nigeria; Beatrice Utondu; Fatima Yusuf; Charity Opara; Chioma Ajunwa	44.67
4 × 400 metres relay	England; Angela Piggford; Jenni Stoute; Sally Gunnell; Linda Keough	3:28.08	Australia; Maree Holland; Sharon Stewart; Susan Andrews; Debbie Flintoff-King	3:30.74	Canada; Rosey Edeh; France Gareau; Cheryl Allen; Gail Harris	3:33.26
10 kilometres walk	Kerry Saxby (AUS)	45:03	Anne Judkins (NZL)	47:03	Lisa Langford (ENG)	47:23
High jump	Tania Murray (NZL)	1.88 m	Janet Boyle (NIR)	1.88 m	Tracy Phillips (NZL)	1.88 m
Long jump	Jane Flemming (AUS)	6.78 m	Beatrice Utondu (NGR)	6.65 m (w)	Fiona May (ENG)	6.55 m
Shot put	Myrtle Augee (ENG)	18.48 m	Judy Oakes (ENG)	18.43 m	Yvonne Hanson-Nortey (ENG)	16.00 m
Discus throw	Lisa-Marie Vizaniari (AUS)	56.38 m	Jackie McKernan (NIR)	54.86 m	Astra Vitols (AUS)	53.84 m
Javelin throw	Tessa Sanderson (ENG)	65.72 m	Sue Howland (AUS)	61.18 m	Kate Farrow (AUS)	58.98 m
Heptathlon	Jane Flemming (AUS)	6695 pts GR	Sharon Jaklofsky-Smith (AUS)	6115 pts	Judy Simpson (ENG)	6085 pts

== Medal table ==
* Host nation (New Zealand)

Rank	Nation	Gold	Silver	Bronze	Total
1	England	13	14	13	40
2	Australia	10	11	5	26
3	Kenya	4	7	1	12
4	Canada	4	0	6	10
5	Nigeria	3	4	3	10
6	Jamaica	2	0	2	4
6	Wales	2	0	2	4
8	New Zealand*	1	2	6	9
9	Scotland	1	2	2	5
10	Bermuda	1	0	0	1
10	Cyprus	1	0	0	1
12	Northern Ireland	0	2	0	2
13	Bahamas	0	0	2	2
14	Tanzania	0	0	1	1
Totals (14 entries)		42	42	43	127

== Participation ==
- Australia (83)
- Bahamas (3)
- Bangladesh (4)
- Barbados (1)
- Bermuda (4)
- Botswana (9)
- British Virgin Islands (1)
- Canada (81)
- Cayman Islands (1)
- Cook Islands (4)
- Cyprus (7)
- England (105)
- Falkland Islands (2)
- Gambia (4)
- Ghana (8)
- Guernsey (1)
- Guyana (2)
- Hong Kong (3)
- Isle of Man (3)
- Jamaica (13)
- Jersey (1)
- Kenya (29)
- Lesotho (4)
- Malawi (5)
- Malaysia (3)
- Mauritius (3)
- New Zealand (81)
- Nigeria (14)
- Norfolk Island (1)
- Northern Ireland (9)
- Pakistan (5)
- Papua New Guinea (8)
- Saint Kitts and Nevis (1)
- Scotland (25)
- Seychelles (5)
- Sierra Leone (1)
- Swaziland (4)
- Tanzania (4)
- Tonga (4)
- Trinidad and Tobago (5)
- Uganda (6)
- Vanuatu (3)
- Wales (14)
- Zambia (6)
- Zimbabwe (5)
