= Toni Hodgkinson =

New Zealand middle-distance runner (born 1971)

Personal information
- Born: 12 December 1971 (age 54) Tākaka, New Zealand
- Height: 1.80 m (5 ft 11 in)
- Weight: 62 kg (137 lb)

Sport
- Country: New Zealand
- Sport: Track and field

Toni Louise Hodgkinson (born 12 December 1971) is a New Zealand former middle-distance runner. She represented her country at two Olympic Games and two Commonwealth Games, and currently holds the New Zealand woman's record in the 800 metres.

== Early life ==
Hodgkinson was born in Tākaka on 12 December 1971, the daughter of Sheralyn and Michael Hodgkinson. She was educated at Golden Bay High School, and went on to study at the Auckland School of Physiotherapy.

== Athletics career ==
As a student at Golden Bay High School, Hodgkinson set many New Zealand track and field age-best times, several of which still stand, including 1500 metres in 4:29:50 at 13, and 800 metres in 2:04.31 at age 17.

Hodgkinson represented New Zealand at both the Olympics and the Commonwealth Games. At the 1996 Summer Olympics she made the final, placing eighth with a time of 2:00:54. At the 2000 Summer Olympics she competed in both the 800 m and 1500 m, making it through to the semi-finals in the 800m with a time of 1:59:84.

Hodgkinson competed at the 1990 Commonwealth Games as an 18-year-old, and again at the 1998 Commonwealth Games where she finished eighth in the 1500m final. In 1997, Hodgkinson was a finalist for the Halberg New Zealand Sportswoman of the Year.

== Later life ==
After a decade of living in Auckland, Hodgkinson now lives in Motueka with her husband Alistair Smart and their children. Their daughter, Camryn Smart, is also a competitive middle-distance runner. In 2009, Hodgkinson competed for the Motueka Marvels in the TVNZ game show series Top Town. The Motueka Marvels made it into the finals as the Wild Card team and lost to Taupo in the semi-final.

== Honours and awards ==
In 1990, Hodgkinson was awarded the New Zealand 1990 Commemoration Medal.

== Personal bests ==
Outdoor:

Event	Time	Date	Place
800 m	1:58.25 NR	27 July 1996	Atlanta, United States
1500 m	4:06.23	2 March 2000	Melbourne, Australia
Mile	4:31.19	2 August 1998	Sheffield, England

Indoor:

Event	Time	Date	Place
800 m	2:00.36	9 March 1997	Paris, France
1000 m	2:36.96	6 February 2000	Boston, United States
