= Simon Poelman =

New Zealand decathlete (born 1963)

Personal information
- Born: 27 May 1963 (age 63) Hamilton, New Zealand

Sport
- Country: New Zealand
- Sport: Athletics
- Event: Decathlon
Medal record
Men's athletics
Representing New Zealand
Commonwealth Games
Silver medal – second place	1990 Auckland	Decathlon
Bronze medal – third place	1986 Edinburgh	Decathlon
Bronze medal – third place	1990 Auckland	Pole vault

Simon Roderick Poelman (born 27 May 1963, Hamilton) is a former New Zealand decathlete, who has been described as New Zealand's best ever all-round athlete. In the decathlon, his personal best of 8359 points (which is adjusted from 8366 points as it was hand timed) is still a New Zealand national record. This was set at the national athletics championships in Christchurch 1987. As well as being the national decathlon champion seven times. He was also the New Zealand senior men's national champion in several individual events including the 100m (once), 110m hurdles (seven times), long jump (twice), pole vault (three times), and shot put (once).

He won the bronze medal at the 1986 Commonwealth games in Edinburgh and at the 1990 Commonwealth games he won both the silver medal for decathlon and bronze in the pole vault. At the time of the Seoul Olympics he was ranked fourth in the world at decathlon, but had a bad start when a series of false starts led to a slow 100m time in his heat, and he finished in 16th place on 8021 points.

In 1998, Poelman was convicted of importing ecstasy tablets with a value of $NZ200,000 and sentenced to 3 years in prison. He initially denied the charges but later confessed.

Poelman returned to competitive athletics in 2004, setting a world age-group record, breaking a 23-year world record, for the decathlon.

He was awarded the New Zealand 1990 Commemoration Medal.

== Personal bests ==
Event	Points	Place	Date
Decathlon	8366 (ht) NR	Christchurch	1987
Pole Vault	5.00	Tokyo	1991
