= Jennifer Stoute =

English sprinter (born 1965)

Personal information
- Nationality: British (English)
- Born: 16 April 1965 (age 61) Bradford, West Yorkshire, England
- Height: 175 cm (5 ft 9 in)
- Weight: 65 kg (143 lb)

Sport
- Sport: Athletics
- Event: sprinting
- Club: Essex Ladies Athletic Club; Chafford Hundred
Medal record
Women's athletics
Representing Great Britain
Olympic Games
Bronze medal – third place	1992 Barcelona	4x400 m relay
European Championships
Bronze medal – third place	1990 Split	4×100 m relay
Representing England
Commonwealth Games
Gold medal – first place	1990 Auckland	4x400 m relay
Silver medal – second place	1990 Auckland	4x100 m relay

Jennifer Elaine "Jenny" Stoute (born 16 April 1965) is an English former sprinter. She represented Great Britain at the 1988 Olympic Games in Seoul and the 1992 Olympic Games in Barcelona, where she won a bronze medal in the 4x400 metres relay. She also appeared as Rebel in the ITV show Gladiators from 1996 to 1999.

== Biography ==
Stoute was born in Bradford, West Yorkshire, England, to Barbadian parents. She first came to prominence when she finished second behind Simmone Jacobs in the 200 metres event at the 1986 WAAA Championships. Shortly after she reached the 200 metres final representing England at the 1986 Commonwealth Games in 1986 Commonwealth Games in Edinburgh, Scotland, where she pulled up injured and failed to finish. In 1988, at the Olympic Games, she was a member of the British 4 × 400 m relay quartet that finished sixth in the final. In 1989, she finished fourth in the 200 metres final at the European Indoor Championships.

In January 1990, representing England at the 1990 Commonwealth Games in Auckland, New Zealand, Stoute was fourth in the 200 metres final, just one one-hundredth of a second behind bronze medalist Pauline Davis. She also finished fifth in the 400 metres final before winning two relay medals, silver in the 4 × 100 m and gold in the 4 × 400 m, along with Angela Piggford, Linda Keough and Sally Gunnell. At the 1990 European Championships in Split, she won a bronze medal in the 4 × 400 m relay, along with Pat Beckford, Keough and Gunnell. Stoute became the British 200 champion after winning the British AAA Championships title at the 1990 AAA Championships.

At the 1991 World Championships, she again succumbed to injury pulling up in her 200m quarter-final and forcing her out of the relay.

The peak of Stoute's career came in 1992, at the Barcelona Olympics, where she ran her lifetime best in the 200 metres of 22.73 secs to reach the semi-finals, before going on to earn a bronze medal in the 4 × 400 m relay along with Phylis Smith, Sandra Douglas and Sally Gunnell. She competed at the 1993 World Championships, where she reached the quarter-finals of the 200 metres. After two years struggling with injuries, she finished fifth in the 200 metres at the 1996 British Olympic trials in Birmingham, failing to earn selection. Her final major Competition was the 1997 World Indoor Championships.

From 1996 - 1999 she appeared as "Rebel" in the TV show Gladiators. She also returned for the 2008 revival and appeared in two Legend specials.

Stoute has two daughters, both born in Bromley, Greater London: Alicia Jazmin Regis (born 2001) and Renee Stefani Regis (born 2005).
