= 2000 European Athletics Indoor Championships =

- Dates: 25–27 February
- Host city: Ghent; Belgium
- Venue: Flanders Sports Arena
- Events: 28
- Participation: 546 athletes from 44 nations

The 2000 European Athletics Indoor Championships were held from Friday, 25 February to Sunday, 27 February 2000 in Ghent, Belgium. This edition marked the return of relay races to European Indoor Championships, having been held for the last time in 1975.

== Results ==
=== Men ===
Event	Gold		Silver		Bronze	
60 metres	Jason Gardener; Great Britain	6.49	Georgios Theodoridis; Greece	6.51	Aggelos Pavlakakis; Greece	6.54
200 metres	Christian Malcolm; Great Britain	20.54	Patrick Stevens; Belgium	20.70	Julian Golding; Great Britain	21.05
400 metres	Iliya Dzhivondov; Bulgaria	46.63	David Canal; Spain	46.85	Marc Raquil; France	47.28
800 metres	Yuriy Borzakovskiy; Russia	1:47.92	Nils Schumann; Germany	1:48.41	Balázs Korányi; Hungary	1:48.42
1500 metres	José Antonio Redolat; Spain	3:40.51	James Nolan; Ireland	3:41.59	Mehdi Baala; France	3:42.27
3000 m	Mark Carroll; Ireland	7:49.24	Rui Silva; Portugal	7:49.70	John Mayock; Great Britain	7:49.97
60 metres hurdles	Staņislavs Olijars; Latvia	7.50	Tony Jarrett; Great Britain	7.53	Tomasz Ścigaczewski; Poland	7.56
4 × 400 metre relay	Czech Republic; Jiří Mužík; Jan Poděbradský; Štěpán Tesařík; Karel Bláha	3:06.10	Germany; Ingo Schultz; Ruwen Faller; Krause; Lars Figura	3:06.64	Hungary; Péter Nyilasi; Attila Kilvinger; Zétény Dombi; Tibor Bédi	3:09.35
High jump	Vyacheslav Voronin; Russia	2.34	Martin Buss; Germany	2.34	Dragutin Topić; Yugoslavia	2.34
Pole vault	Aleksander Averbukh; Israel	5.75	Martin Eriksson; Sweden	5.70	Rens Blom; Netherlands	5.60
Long jump	Petar Dachev; Bulgaria	8.26	Bogdan Tarus; Romania	8.20	Vitaliy Shkurlatov; Russia	8.10
Triple jump	Charles Friedek; Germany	17.28	Rostislav Dimitrov; Bulgaria	17.22	Paolo Camossi; Italy	17.05
Shot put	Timo Aaltonen; Finland	20.62	Manuel Martínez; Spain	20.38	Miroslav Menc; Czech Republic	20.23
Heptathlon	Tomáš Dvořák; Czech Republic	6,424	Roman Šebrle; Czech Republic	6,271	Erki Nool; Estonia	6,200
WR world record | ER European record | CR championship record | NR national record | WL world leading | EL European leading | PB personal best | SB seasonal best

=== Women ===
Games	Gold		Silver		Bronze	
60 m	Ekaterini Thanou (GRE)	7.05	Petya Pendareva (BUL)	7.11	Irina Pukha (UKR)	7.11
200 m	Muriel Hurtis (FRA)	23.06	Alenka Bikar (SLO)	23.16	Yekaterina Leshchova (RUS)	23.20
400 m	Svetlana Pospelova (RUS)	51.66	Natalya Nazarova (RUS)	51.69	Helena Fuchsová (CZE)	52.32
800 m	Stephanie Graf (AUT)	1:59.70	Natalya Tsyganova (RUS)	2:00.17	Sandra Stals (BEL)	2:01.34
1500 m	Violeta Szekely (ROM)	4:12.82	Olga Kuznetsova (RUS)	4:13.45	Yuliya Kosenkova (RUS)	4:13.60
3000 m	Gabriela Szabo (ROM)	8:42.06	Lidia Chojecka (POL)	8:42.42	Marta Domínguez (ESP)	8:44.08
60 m hurdles	Linda Ferga (FRA)	7.88	Patricia Girard (FRA)	7.98	Olena Krasovska (UKR)	8.03
4 × 400 m	Russia; Olesya Zykina; Irina Rosikhina; Yuliya Sotnikova; Svetlana Pospelova	3:32.53	Italy; Francesca Carbone; Carla Barbarino; Patrizia Spuri; Virna De Angeli	3:35.01	Romania; Georgeta Lazar; Anca Safta; Otilia Ruicu; Alina Ripanu	3:36.28
High jump	Kajsa Bergqvist (SWE)	2.00 m	Zuzana Hlavoňová (CZE)	1.98 m	Olga Kaliturina (RUS)	1.96 m
Pole vault	Pavla Hamáčková-Rybová (CZE)	4.40	Yelena Belyakova (RUS); Christine Adams (GER)	4.35		
Long jump	Erica Johansson (SWE)	6.89 m	Heike Drechsler (GER)	6.86 m	Iva Prandzheva (BUL)	6.80 m
Triple jump	Tatyana Lebedeva (RUS)	14.68 m	Cristina Nicolau (ROM)	14.63 m	Iva Prandzheva (BUL)	14.63 m
Shot put	Larisa Peleshenko (RUS)	20.15 m	Nadine Kleinert (GER)	19.23 m	Astrid Kumbernuss (GER)	19.12 m
Pentathlon	Karin Ertl (GER)	4671 pts	Irina Vostrikova (RUS)	4615 pts	Urszula Włodarczyk (POL)	4590 pts

== Medal table ==
Rank	Nation	Gold	Silver	Bronze	Total
1	Russia (RUS)	6	5	4	15
2	Czech Republic (CZE)	3	2	2	7
3	Germany (GER)	2	6	1	9
4	Bulgaria (BUL)	2	2	2	6
5	Romania (ROM)	2	2	1	5
6	France (FRA)	2	1	2	5
6	Great Britain (GBR)	2	1	2	5
8	Sweden (SWE)	2	1	0	3
9	Spain (ESP)	1	2	1	4
10	Greece (GRE)	1	1	1	3
11	Ireland (IRL)	1	1	0	2
12	Austria (AUT)	1	0	0	1
12	Finland (FIN)	1	0	0	1
12	Israel (ISR)	1	0	0	1
12	Latvia (LAT)	1	0	0	1
16	Poland (POL)	0	1	2	3
17	Belgium (BEL)	0	1	1	2
17	Italy (ITA)	0	1	1	2
19	Portugal (POR)	0	1	0	1
19	Slovenia (SLO)	0	1	0	1
21	Hungary (HUN)	0	0	2	2
21	Ukraine (UKR)	0	0	2	2
23	Estonia (EST)	0	0	1	1
23	Netherlands (NED)	0	0	1	1
23	Serbia and Montenegro (SCG)	0	0	1	1
Totals (25 entries)		28	29	27	84

== Participating nations ==
- Andorra (2)
- Armenia (1)
- Austria (10)
- Azerbaijan (1)
- Belarus (3)
- Belgium (29)
- Bosnia and Herzegovina (2)
- Bulgaria (11)
- Croatia (2)
- Cyprus (4)
- Czech Republic (13)
- Denmark (2)
- Estonia (3)
- Finland (13)
- France (50)
- Germany (50)
- Great Britain (28)
- Greece (22)
- Hungary (20)
- Iceland (4)
- Ireland (7)
- Israel (5)
- Italy (36)
- Latvia (4)
- Lithuania (5)
- Luxembourg (1)
- Macedonia (1)
- Malta (1)
- Moldova (1)
- Netherlands (11)
- Norway (5)
- Poland (18)
- Portugal (9)
- Romania (18)
- Russia (53)
- San Marino (2)
- Slovakia (6)
- Slovenia (12)
- Spain (22)
- Sweden (20)
- Switzerland (8)
- Turkey (8)
- Ukraine (21)
- Yugoslavia (2)

== See also ==
- 2000 in athletics (track and field)
