= Manuela Derr =

German sprinter (born 1971)

Medal record

Women's athletics

Representing East Germany

European Championships
Gold medal – first place	1990 Split	4×400 m

World Junior Championships
Bronze medal – third place	1990 Plovdiv	400 m

Manuela Derr, married Rödel (born 17 July 1971 in Neubrandenburg) is a retired East German sprinter who specialized in the 400 metres. She was banned from competing for doping in 1992.

== Biography ==
She won most of her medals at the junior level. At the 1988 World Junior Championships she finished fifth in the individual distance and a gold medal in 4 × 400 metres relay. At the 1989 European Junior Championships she won four medals; a gold medal in 4 × 400 m relay, a silver medal in the 200 metres and bronze medals in the 100 metres and 4 × 100 metres relay. At the 1990 World Junior Championships she won the bronze medal in the individual distance and finished fourth in relay.

At the 1990 European Championships Derr won a gold medal in relay, with teammates Annett Hesselbarth, Grit Breuer and Petra Schersing.

In 1992 Derr was found guilty of clenbuterol doping, together with training partners Grit Breuer and Katrin Krabbe.

Her personal best time was 51.95 seconds, achieved at the 1990 World Junior Championships in Plovdiv. She represented the sports club SC Neubrandenburg.
