= Virna De Angeli =

Italian sprinter (born 1976)

Personal information
- Nationality: Italian
- Born: 27 February 1976 (age 50) Gravedona, Italy
- Height: 1.68 m (5 ft 6 in)
- Weight: 56 kg (123 lb)

Sport
- Country: Italy
- Sport: Athletics
- Event: 400 metres
- Club: Ginnastica Comense 1872

Achievements and titles
- Personal bests: 200 m: 23"24 (1996); 400 m: 52"17 (1996); 400 m hs: 55"64 (1996)
Medal record
European Indoor Championships
Silver medal – second place	2000 Ghent	4x400 m relay
Mediterranean Games
Gold medal – first place	1997 Bari	400 m

Virna De Angeli (born 27 February 1976 in Gravedona) is an Italian former sprinter.

== Biography ==
In her career, she won 10 national championships. She is married to the 2004 Summer Olympics marathon champion, Stefano Baldini. The couple have two daughters, Alessia (born 2001) and Laura (born 2012).

== National records ==
- 4x400 metres relay: 3'26"69 ( (France) Paris, 20 June 1999) – with Francesca Carbone, Patrizia Spuri, Danielle Perpoli
- 4x400 metres relay indoor: 3'35"01 ( (Belgium) Ghent, 27 February 2000) – with Francesca Carbone, Patrizia Spuri, Carla Barbarino

== Achievements ==
Year	Competition	Venue	Position	Event	Notes
Representing Italy
1994	World Junior Championships	Lisbon, Portugal	2nd	400m hurdles	56.93
1994	World Junior Championships	Lisbon, Portugal	11th (h)	4×400m relay	3:41.02
1994	European Championships	Helsinki, Finland	24th (h)	400m hurdles	58.60
1994	European Championships	Helsinki, Finland	10th (h)	4x400m relay	3:33.31
1997	Mediterranean Games	Bari, Italy	1st	400 metres	51.31
2000	European Indoor Championships	Ghent, Belgium	2nd	4x400 metres relay	3:35.01

== National titles ==
- 2 wins in 200 metres at the Italian Athletics Championships (1996, 1997)
- 2 wins in 200 metres at the Italian Athletics Indoor Championships (1996, 1997)
- 3 wins in 400 metres at the Italian Athletics Championships (1999, 2003, 2004)
- 1 win in 400 metres at the Italian Athletics Indoor Championships (1999)
- 1 win in 400 metres hurdles at the Italian Athletics Championships (1994)

== See also ==
- Italian all-time top lists – 200 metres
- Italian all-time top lists – 400 metres
- Italian all-time lists – 400 metres hurdles
