= Charity Opara =

Nigerian sprinter

Personal information
- Born: 20 May 1972 (age 54) Owerri, Nigeria
Medal record
Women's athletics
Representing Nigeria
Olympic Games
Silver medal – second place	1996 Atlanta	4×400 m relay
African Championships
Gold medal – first place	1989 Lagos	4×400 m
Gold medal – first place	1990 Cairo	4×400 m
Silver medal – second place	1990 Cairo	400 m
Silver medal – second place	1998 Dakar	400 m
World Junior Championships
Silver medal – second place	1990 Plovdiv	400 metres

Charity Opara-Asonze // (born 20 May 1972 in Owerri, Imo State) is a former Nigerian track and field athlete who mainly competed in the 400 metres. She was in particular a successful relay runner, winning the silver medal at the 1996 Olympics.

Opara was banned between 1992 and 1996 for a positive drug test.

== Personal bests ==
- 100 metres - 11.40 (1999)
- 200 metres - 22.60 (1992)
- 400 metres - 49.29 (1998)
- Long jump - 6.55 m (1994)

== Achievements ==
Year	Competition	Venue	Position	Event	Notes
Representing Nigeria
1989	African Championships	Lagos, Nigeria	1st	4 × 400 m relay	3:33.12
1990	African Championships	Cairo, Egypt	2nd	400 metres	51.68
1990	African Championships	Cairo, Egypt	1st	4 × 400 m relay	3:40.04
1990	Commonwealth Games	Auckland, New Zealand	3rd	4 × 100 m relay	44.67
1990	Commonwealth Games	Auckland, New Zealand	3rd	400m	52.01
1990	World Junior Championships	Plovdiv, Bulgaria	2nd	400m	51.28
1990	World Junior Championships	Plovdiv, Bulgaria	1st (h)	4 × 400 m relay	3:33.56
1991	All-Africa Games	Cairo, Egypt	2nd	400 metres	51.23
1991	All-Africa Games	Cairo, Egypt	1st	4 × 400 m relay	3:31.05
1996	Summer Olympics	Atlanta, United States	2nd	4 × 400 m relay	3:21.04
1998	Grand Prix Final	Moscow, Russia	2nd	400 metres	50.09
2000	Grand Prix Final	Doha, Qatar	3rd	400 metres	50.85

== See also ==
- Doping cases in athletics
