= Angela Piggford =

English sprinter

Angela Gilmour née Piggford
Personal information
- Nationality: British (English)
- Born: 17 August 1963 (age 62) Gateshead, County Durham, England
- Height: 162 cm (5 ft 4 in)
- Weight: 56 kg (123 lb)

Sport
- Sport: Athletics
- Event: 400m
- Club: Gateshead Harriers
Medal record
Athletics
Representing England
Commonwealth Games
Silver medal – second place	1986 Edinburgh	4x400 m relay
Gold medal – first place	1990 Auckland	4x400 m relay

Angela Mary Gilmour (née Piggford, born 17 August 1963) is an English former track and field athlete who competed in the 400 metres and the 4 x 400 metres relay. In the relay, she represented Great Britain at the 1988 Olympic Games in Seoul, South Korea, while at the Commonwealth Games, she won a silver medal in Edinburgh 1986 and a gold medal in Auckland 1990.

== Biography ==
Piggford was born in Gateshead, County Durham, England, and was a member of Gateshead Harriers. After finishing second behind Kathy Cook in the 400 metres event at the 1986 WAAA Championships, Piggford represented England at the Commonwealth Games in Edinburgh, reaching the final of the 400 metres, finishing eighth in 53.97 secs, before teaming up with Jane Parry, Linda Keough and Kathy Cook, to win a silver medal in the 4x400 metres relay in 3:32.82.

In 1988, Piggford earned late selection for the 4 × 400 m relay squad for the 1988 Seoul Olympics. She didn't compete in the heats but came in as a replacement for Janet Smith for the final. The British quartet of Linda Keough, Jennifer Stoute, Piggford and Sally Gunnell, finished sixth in 3:26.89.

Piggford had some of her best results indoors, including reaching the 400 metres final at the European Indoor Championships in both 1989 and 1990. At The Hague in 1989, she was fourth in an indoor best time of 52.90. In Glasgow in 1990, she was fifth. She also competed at the 1989 World Indoor Championships in Budapest.

In January 1990, Piggford competed at her second Commonwealth Games in Auckland. In the 400 metres final, she finished fifth in 53.45. In the 4 × 400 m relay, along with Stoute, Gunnell and Keough, she won a gold medal in 3:28.08. At the European Championships in Split, she ran 53.00 to reach the semi-finals of the 400 metres. She ran in the heats of the 4 x 400 metres relay. The British quartet went on to win a bronze medal in the final with Sally Gunnell replacing Piggford. This would be her final appearance at a major championships.

Piggford won both the UK title and the AAAs Indoor title in 1986. Her lifetime best in the 400 metres is 52.79, achieved in Edinburgh on 2 July 1989. Her indoor best of 52.90 at The Hague in 1989, ranked her third on the UK all-time indoor list at the time, behind Sally Gunnell and Verona Elder. As of 2013, the time still ranks her in the UK indoor all-time top twenty.

== National titles ==
- AAA Championships 400 metres 2nd (1986) & 3rd (1989)
- UK National 400 metres Champion (1986) 2nd (1985, 1988, 1989)
- AAA Indoor Championships 400 metres Champion (1986) 3rd (1989)

== International competitions ==
Year	Competition	Venue	Position	Event	Notes
Representing Great Britain / England
1986	European Indoor Championships	Madrid, Spain	12th (h)	400 m	55.07
1986	Commonwealth Games	Edinburgh, Scotland	8th	400 m	53.97
1986	Commonwealth Games	Edinburgh, Scotland	2nd	4 × 400 m	3:32.82
1988	Olympic Games	Seoul, South Korea	6th	4 × 400 m	3:26.89
1989	European Indoor Championships	The Hague, Netherlands	4th	400 m	52.90
1989	World Indoor Championships	Budapest, Hungary	14th (h)	400 m	53.69
1990	Commonwealth Games	Auckland, New Zealand	5th	400 m	53.45
1990	Commonwealth Games	Auckland, New Zealand	1st	4 × 400 m	3:28.08
1990	European Indoor Championships	Glasgow, Scotland	5th	400 m	53.82
1990	European Championships	Split, Yugoslavia	15th (sf)	400 m	53.53 (53.00 ht)

(#) Indicates overall position in qualifying heats (h) or semifinals (sf).
