= 1985 European Cup (athletics) =

- Dates: 17–18 August ("A" Finals); 10–11 August ("B" & "C" Finals)
- Host city: Moscow, Soviet Union
- Level: Senior
- Type: Outdoor
- Events: 36

The 1985 European Cup was the 10th edition of the European Cup of athletics.

The "A" Finals were held in Moscow, Soviet Union. The first two teams qualified for the 1985 IAAF World Cup.

== "A" Final ==
Held on 17 and 18 August in Moscow, Soviet Union

=== Teams standings ===
Men
Pos.	Nation	Points
1	Soviet Union	125
2	East Germany	114
3	West Germany	92
4	Great Britain	90
5	Poland	85
6	Italy	72
7	Czechoslovakia	72
8	France	70

Women
Pos.	Nation	Points
1	Soviet Union	118
2	East Germany	111
3	Great Britain	67
4	Bulgaria	65
5	Czechoslovakia	62
6	Poland	60
7	West Germany	57
8	Italy	35

=== Results summary ===
==== Men's events ====
Event	Gold		Silver		Bronze	
100 m (Wind: +0.6 m/s)	Marian Woronin; Poland	10.14	Vladimir Muravyov; Russia	10.22	Frank Emmelmann; East Germany	10.33
200 m (Wind: +0.2 m/s)	Frank Emmelmann; East Germany	20.23; CR	Aleksandr Yevgenyev; Soviet Union	20.42	Ralf Lübke; West Germany	20.43
400 m	Thomas Schönlebe; East Germany	44.96; CR	Vladimir Krylov; Soviet Union	45.22	Derek Redmond; Great Britain	45.35
800 m	Tom McKean; Great Britain	1:49.11	Piotr Piekarski; Poland	1:49.73	Peter Braun; West Germany	1:49.79
1500 m	Steve Cram; Great Britain	3:43.71	Olaf Beyer; East Germany	3:44.96	Stefano Mei; Italy	3:45.14
5000 m	Alberto Cova; Italy	14:05.45	Thomas Wessinghage; West Germany	14:05.72	Steve Harris; Great Britain	14:06.25
10,000 m	Alberto Cova; Italy	28:51.46	Werner Schildhauer; East Germany	28:56.57	Christoph Herle; West Germany	29:02.92
3000 m steeplechase	Patriz Ilg; West Germany	8:16.14	Bogusław Mamiński; Poland	8:17.40	Joseph Mahmoud; France	8:17.85
110 m hurdles (Wind: +0.6 m/s)	Sergey Usov; Soviet Union	13.56	Daniele Fontecchio; Italy	13.66	Stéphane Caristan; France	13.67
400 m hurdles	Harald Schmid; West Germany	47.85 =CR	Aleksandr Vasilyev; Soviet Union	47.92	Mark Holtom; Great Britain	50.47
4 × 100 m	Soviet Union; Andrey Shlyapnikov; Aleksandr Semyonov; Aleksandr Yevgenyev; Vladimir Muravyov	38.28	East Germany; Heiko Truppel; Steffen Bringmann; Olaf Prenzler; Frank Emmelmann	38.53	(Italy) Italy; Antonio Ullo; Carlo Simionato; Domenico Gorla; Stefano Tilli	38.88
4 × 400 m	West Germany; Erwin Skamrahl; Klaus Just; Harald Schmid; Ralf Lübke	3:00.36; CR	East Germany; Guido Lieske; Jens Carlowitz; Mathias Schersing; Thomas Schönlebe	3:00.48	Great Britain; Alan Slack; Kriss Akabusi; Derek Redmond; Todd Bennett	3:03.31
High jump	Ján Zvara; Czechoslovakia	2.29	Gerd Wessig; East Germany	2.29	Igor Paklin; Soviet Union	2.26
Pole vault	Sergey Bubka; Soviet Union	5.80; CR	Philippe Collet; France	5.70	Marian Kolasa; Poland	5.60
Long jump	Sergey Layevskiy; Soviet Union	8.19	Jan Leitner; Czechoslovakia	8.00	Uwe Lange; East Germany	7.96
Triple jump	John Herbert; Great Britain	17.39	Volker Mai; East Germany	17.26	Oleg Protsenko; Soviet Union	16.99
Shot put	Sergey Smirnov; Soviet Union	22.05; CR	Alessandro Andrei; Italy	20.26	Udo Beyer; East Germany	20.51
Discus throw	Imrich Bugár; Czechoslovakia	66.80	Georgiy Kolnootchenko; Soviet Union	65.60	Dariusz Juzyszyn; Poland	65.12
Hammer throw	Jüri Tamm; Soviet Union	82.90; CR	František Vrbka; Czechoslovakia	80.38	Matthias Moder; East Germany	77.88
Javelin throw	Uwe Hohn; East Germany	92.88; CR	Viktor Yevsyukov; Soviet Union	88.26	Zdeněk Adamec; Czechoslovakia	86.08
WR world record | AR area record | CR championship record | GR games record | NR national record | OR Olympic record | PB personal best | SB season best | WL world leading (in a given season)

==== Women's events ====
Event	Gold		Silver		Bronze	
100 m (Wind: +0.1 m/s)	Marlies Göhr; East Germany	10.95; CR	Marina Zhirova; Soviet Union	10.98	Anelia Nuneva; Bulgaria	11.14
200 m (Wind: +0.2 m/s)	Marita Koch; East Germany	22.02; CR	Elvira Barbashina; Soviet Union	22.70	Ewa Kasprzyk; Poland	22.72
400 m	Olga Vladykina; Soviet Union	48.60 =CR	Kirsten Emmelmann; East Germany	50.20	Rositsa Stamenova; Bulgaria	51.75
800 m	Jarmila Kratochvílová; Czechoslovakia	1:55.91; CR	Nadiya Olizarenko; Soviet Union	1:56.63	Christine Wachtel; East Germany	1:56.71
1500 m	Ravilya Agletdinova; Soviet Union	3:58.40; CR	Christina Boxer; Great Britain	4:02.58	Hildegard Körner; East Germany	4:03.55
3000 m	Zola Budd; Great Britain	8:35.32; CR	Zamira Zaytseva; Soviet Union	8:35.74	Ulrike Bruns; East Germany	8:36.51
10,000 m	Olga Bondarenko; Soviet Union	31:47.38; CR	Ines Bibernell; East Germany	32:47.42	Angela Tooby; Great Britain	33:04.66
100 m hurdles (Wind: +1.6 m/s)	Ginka Zagorcheva; Bulgaria	12.77	Vera Akimova; Soviet Union	12.80	Cornelia Oschkenat; East Germany	12.83
400 m hurdles	Sabine Busch; East Germany	54.13; CR	Marina Stepanova; Soviet Union	54.73	Genowefa Błaszak; Poland	55.90
4 × 100 m	East Germany; Silke Gladisch; Marita Koch; Ingrid Auerswald-Lange; Marlies Göhr	41.65; CR	Soviet Union; Antonina Nastoburko; Natalya Pomoshchnikova; Marina Zhirova; Elvira Barbashina	42.00	Poland; Elżbieta Tomczak; Iwona Pakuła; Ewa Pisiewicz; Ewa Kasprzyk	42.71
4 × 400 m	Soviet Union; Olga Nazarova; Nadiya Olizarenko; Mariya Pinigina; Olga Vladykina	3:18.58; CR	East Germany; Kirsten Emmelmann; Sabine Busch; Dagmar Neubauer; Petra Müller	3:20.10	Czechoslovakia; Alena Bulirová; Zuzana Moravčíková; Milena Strnadová; Jarmila Kratochvílová	3:26.59
High jump	Stefka Kostadinova; Bulgaria	2.06; CR	Tamara Bykova; Soviet Union	2.02	Susanne Helm; East Germany	1.96
Long jump	Galina Chistyakova; Soviet Union	7.28; CR	Heike Drechsler; East Germany	7.23	Sabine Braun; West Germany	6.71
Shot put	Natalya Lisovskaya; Soviet Union	21.10	Helena Fibingerová; Czechoslovakia	19.86	Ines Müller; East Germany	19.76
Discus throw	Galina Savinkova; Soviet Union	70.24	Martina Opitz; East Germany	68.20	Tsvetanka Khristova; Bulgaria	62.92
Javelin throw	Petra Felke; East Germany	73.20; CR	Fatima Whitbread; Great Britain	71.90	Natalya Kolenchukova; Soviet Union	65.92
WR world record | AR area record | CR championship record | GR games record | NR national record | OR Olympic record | PB personal best | SB season best | WL world leading (in a given season)

== "B" Final ==
Both "B" finals held on 10 and 11 August in Budapest, Hungary

Men
Pos.	Nation	Points
1	Spain	116
2	Bulgaria	113
3	Hungary	106.5
4	Finland	82.5
5	Switzerland	82
6	Yugoslavia	81
7	Greece	81
8	Norway	57

Women
Pos.	Nation	Points
1	France	102
2	Romania	101
3	Hungary	82
4	Finland	69
5	Netherlands	68
6	Sweden	61
7	Yugoslavia	57
8	Denmark	35

== "C" Finals ==
All "C" finals held on 10 and 11 August

=== Men ===
"C1" Final
Held in Schwechat, Austria

Pos.	Nation	Points
1	Austria	75
2	Portugal	72
3	Netherlands	68
4	Cyprus	48
5	Turkey	37

"C2" Final
Held in Reykjavík, Iceland

Pos.	Nation	Points
1	Sweden	79
2	Belgium	68
3	Denmark	54
4	Ireland	53
5	Iceland	45

=== Women ===
"C1" Final
Held in Schwechat, Austria

Pos.	Nation	Points
1	Switzerland	82
2	Spain	68
3	Austria	65
4	Portugal	52
5	Cyprus	36
6	Greece	32

"C2" Final
Held in Reykjavík, Iceland

Pos.	Nation	Points
1	Norway	49
2	Belgium	48
3	Ireland	32
4	Iceland	30
