= Athletics at the Friendship Games – Women's 400 metres =

The women's 400 metres event at the Friendship Games was held on 16 August 1984 at the Evžen Rošický Stadium in Prague, Czechoslovakia.

== Medalists ==
Gold	Silver	Bronze
Marita Koch; East Germany	Taťána Kocembová; Czechoslovakia	Olga Vladykina; Soviet Union

== Results ==
=== Heats ===
Rank	Heat	Name	Nationality	Time	Notes
1	2	Olga Vladykina	Soviet Union	49.94	Q
2	1	Mariya Pinigina	Soviet Union	49.98	Q
3	1	Marita Koch	East Germany	50.29	Q
4	1	Taťána Kocembová	Czechoslovakia	50.58	Q
5	1	Rositsa Stamenova	Bulgaria	50.82	q
5	2	Jarmila Kratochvílová	Czechoslovakia	50.82	Q
7	1	Ana Fidelia Quirot	Cuba	50.87	q
8	2	Kirsten Emmelmann	East Germany	51.02	Q
9	2	Liliya Novoseltsova	Soviet Union	51.23	qB
10	2	Petra Müller	East Germany	51.77	qB
11	1	Alena Bulířová	Czechoslovakia	52.21	qB
12	2	Regine Berg	Belgium	53.01	qB
13	1	Patricia Duboux	Switzerland	55.44	qB

=== "A" Final ===
Rank	Name	Nationality	Time	Notes
1st place, gold medalist(s)	Marita Koch	East Germany	48.16	
2nd place, silver medalist(s)	Taťána Kocembová	Czechoslovakia	48.73	
3rd place, bronze medalist(s)	Olga Vladykina	Soviet Union	49.52	
4	Mariya Pinigina	Soviet Union	49.89	
5	Jarmila Kratochvílová	Czechoslovakia	49.94	
6	Rositsa Stamenova	Bulgaria	50.85	
7	Kirsten Emmelmann	East Germany	50.96	
8	Ana Fidelia Quirot	Cuba	51.94	

=== "B" Final ===
Rank	Name	Nationality	Time	Notes
1	Liliya Novoseltsova	Soviet Union	50.67	
2	Petra Müller	East Germany	51.38	
3	Alena Bulířová	Czechoslovakia	52.66	
4	Regine Berg	Belgium	53.11	
5	Patricia Duboux	Switzerland	56.11	

== See also ==
- Athletics at the 1984 Summer Olympics – Women's 400 metres
