= 1986 European Athletics Championships – Women's 400 metres =

Women's 400 metres at the European Athletics Championships
- Venue: Neckarstadion
- Location: Stuttgart, West Germany
- Dates: 26, 27, and 28 August 1986
- Competitors: 18 from 11 nations
- Winning time: 48.22 s

Medalists
gold medal	Marita Koch	East Germany
silver medal	Olga Vladykina	Soviet Union
bronze medal	Petra Müller	East Germany

The women's 400 metres event at the 1986 European Athletics Championships was held in Stuttgart, then West Germany, at Neckarstadion on 26, 27, and 28 August 1986.

== Results ==
=== Round 1 ===
26 August

Results of the first heat of round 1
Rank	Athlete	Nation	Time	Notes
1	Marita Koch	East Germany	52.34	Q
2	Mariya Pinigina	Soviet Union	52.43	Q
3	Karin Lix	West Germany	52.86	Q
4	Fabienne Ficher	France	52.91	Q
5	Blanca Lacambra	Spain	54.51	
6	Patricia Walsh	Ireland	54.65	

Results of the second heat of round 1
Rank	Athlete	Nation	Time	Notes
1	Marzena Wojdecka	Poland	52.79	Q
2	Kirsten Emmelmann	East Germany	52.81	Q
3	Olga Vladykina	Soviet Union	52.92	Q
4	Gisela Kinzel	West Germany	53.02	Q
5	Cosetta Campana	Italy	53.30	q
6	Anne Gundersen	Norway	54.35	q

Results of the third heat of round 1
Rank	Athlete	Nation	Time	Notes
1	Olga Nazarova	Soviet Union	52.26	Q
2	Petra Müller	East Germany	52.36	Q
3	Taťána Kocembová	Czechoslovakia	52.39	Q
4	Ute Thimm	West Germany	52.39	Q
5	Helen Barnett	United Kingdom	52.46	q
6	Erika Rossi	Italy	53.31	q

=== Semi-finals ===
27 August

Results of the first heat of the semi-finals
Rank	Athlete	Nation	Time	Notes
1	Petra Müller	East Germany	49.84	Q
2	Olga Vladykina	Soviet Union	50.23	Q
3	Kirsten Emmelmann	East Germany	50.79	Q
4	Ute Thimm	West Germany	51.60	Q
5	Olga Nazarova	Soviet Union	52.11	
6	Marzena Wojdecka	Poland	53.26	
7	Cosetta Campana	Italy	53.89	
8	Anne Gundersen	Norway	53.98	

Results of the second heat of the semi-finals
Rank	Athlete	Nation	Time	Notes
1	Marita Koch	East Germany	50.74	Q
2	Taťána Kocembová	Czechoslovakia	51.91	Q
3	Fabienne Ficher	France	52.14	Q
4	Karin Lix	West Germany	52.46	Q
5	Helen Barnett	United Kingdom	52.47	
6	Erika Rossi	Italy	53.22	
	Gisela Kinzel	West Germany	DQ	
	Mariya Pinigina	Soviet Union	DNS	

=== Final ===
28 August

Results of the final
Rank	Athlete	Nation	Time	Notes
1st place, gold medalist(s)	Marita Koch	East Germany	48.22	
2nd place, silver medalist(s)	Olga Vladykina	Soviet Union	49.67	
3rd place, bronze medalist(s)	Petra Müller	East Germany	49.88	
4	Kirsten Emmelmann	East Germany	50.43	
5	Ute Thimm	West Germany	51.15	
6	Taťána Kocembová	Czechoslovakia	51.50	
7	Fabienne Ficher	France	51.91	
8	Karin Lix	West Germany	52.89	
