= 1986 European Athletics Indoor Championships – Women's 400 metres =

The women's 400 metres event at the 1986 European Athletics Indoor Championships was held on 22 and 23 February.

== Medalists ==
Gold	Silver	Bronze
Sabine Busch; East Germany	Petra Müller; East Germany	Ann-Louise Skoglund; Sweden

== Results ==
=== Heats ===
The winner of each heat (Q) and the next 4 fastest (q) qualified for the semifinals.

Rank	Heat	Name	Nationality	Time	Notes
1	1	Petra Müller	East Germany	52.47	Q
2	1	Taťána Kocembová	Czechoslovakia	53.16	q
3	4	Ann-Louise Skoglund	Sweden	53.98	Q
4	2	Sabine Busch	East Germany	54.03	Q
5	4	Gisela Kinzel	West Germany	54.08	q
6	2	Astrid Ortel	West Germany	54.21	q
7	2	Erica Rossi	Italy	54.25	q
8	4	Cristina Pérez	Spain	54.25	
9	3	Ute Thimm	West Germany	54.86	Q
10	4	Gerda Haas	Austria	54.94	
11	1	Fabienne Lise	France	54.97	
12	3	Angela Piggford	Great Britain	55.07	
13	3	Pepa Pavlova	Bulgaria	55.34	
14	2	Semra Aksu	Turkey	56.13	
	3	Cristieana Cojocaru	Romania	DNS	

=== Semifinals ===
First 2 from each semifinal qualified directly (Q) for the final.

Rank	Heat	Name	Nationality	Time	Notes
1	1	Sabine Busch	East Germany	52.17	Q
2	2	Petra Müller	East Germany	52.91	Q
3	1	Taťána Kocembová	Czechoslovakia	53.27	Q
4	2	Ann-Louise Skoglund	Sweden	53.39	Q
5	2	Erica Rossi	Italy	53.67	
6	1	Ute Thimm	West Germany	54.24	
7	1	Gisela Kinzel	West Germany	55.09	
8	2	Astrid Ortel	West Germany	56.68	

=== Final ===
Rank	Name	Nationality	Time	Notes
1st place, gold medalist(s)	Sabine Busch	East Germany	51.40	
2nd place, silver medalist(s)	Petra Müller	East Germany	51.59	
3rd place, bronze medalist(s)	Ann-Louise Skoglund	Sweden	52.40	NR
4	Taťána Kocembová	Czechoslovakia	53.16	
