= 1982 European Athletics Indoor Championships – Women's 400 metres =

The women's 400 metres event at the 1982 European Athletics Indoor Championships was held on 6–7 March.

== Medalists ==
Gold	Silver	Bronze
Jarmila Kratochvílová; Czechoslovakia	Dagmar Rübsam; East Germany	Gaby Bußmann; West Germany

== Results ==
=== Heats ===
First 2 of each heat (Q) and the next 2 fastest (q) qualified for the semifinals.

Rank	Heat	Name	Nationality	Time	Notes
1	1	Jarmila Kratochvílová	Czechoslovakia	52.54	Q
2	1	Ann-Louise Skoglund	Sweden	53.09	Q
3	1	Lyudmila Belova	Soviet Union	53.17	q
4	2	Taťána Kocembová	Czechoslovakia	53.55	Q
5	2	Verona Elder	Great Britain	53.56	Q
5	3	Gaby Bußmann	West Germany	53.56	Q
7	2	Mary Wagner	West Germany	53.94	q
8	3	Dagmar Rübsam	East Germany	53.94	Q
9	3	Yelena Korban	Soviet Union	54.14	
10	1	Elke Decker	West Germany	54.37	
11	2	Marie-Christine Champenois	France	55.01	

=== Semifinals ===
First 2 from each semifinal qualified directly (Q) for the final.

Rank	Heat	Name	Nationality	Time	Notes
1	1	Jarmila Kratochvílová	Czechoslovakia	51.90	Q
2	2	Taťána Kocembová	Czechoslovakia	52.43	Q
3	1	Dagmar Rübsam	East Germany	52.73	Q
4	2	Gaby Bußmann	West Germany	52.85	Q
5	2	Ann-Louise Skoglund	Sweden	52.85	
6	1	Mary Wagner	West Germany	52.89	
7	1	Verona Elder	Great Britain	53.00	
8	2	Lyudmila Belova	Soviet Union	53.17	

=== Final ===
Rank	Lane	Name	Nationality	Time	Notes
1st place, gold medalist(s)	2	Jarmila Kratochvílová	Czechoslovakia	49.59	WR
2nd place, silver medalist(s)	3	Dagmar Rübsam	East Germany	51.18	
3rd place, bronze medalist(s)	1	Gaby Bußmann	West Germany	51.57	NR
4	4	Taťána Kocembová	Czechoslovakia	51.62	
