= 1982 European Athletics Championships – Women's 400 metres =

Women's 400 metres at the European Athletics Championships
- Venue: Olympic Stadium "Spiros Louis"
- Location: Athens, Greece
- Dates: 7 and 8 September 1982
- Competitors: 16 from 9 nations
- Winning time: 48.16 s WR

Medalists
gold medal	Marita Koch	East Germany
silver medal	Jarmila Kratochvílová	Czechoslovakia
bronze medal	Taťána Kocembová	Czechoslovakia

These are the official results of the Women's 400 metres event at the 1982 European Championships in Athens, Greece, held at Olympic Stadium "Spiros Louis" on 7 and 8 September 1982.

== Results ==
=== Qualifying heats ===
Rank	Heat 1	Time
1.	Marita Koch (GDR)	50.22
2.	Irina Baskakova (URS)	51.03
3.	Taťána Kocembová (TCH)	51.69
4.	Judit Forgács (HUN)	51.88
5.	Erica Rossi (ITA)	52.01
6.	Grażyna Oliszewska (POL)	53.15
7.	Claudia Steger (FRG)	53.56
8.	Charlotte Holmström (SWE)	55.22

Rank	Heat 2	Time
1.	Jarmila Kratochvílová (TCH)	50.38
2.	Dagmar Rübsam (GDR)	50.55
3.	Gaby Bußmann (FRG)	50.64
4.	Sabine Busch (GDR)	50.80
5.	Yelena Korban (URS)	50.83
6.	Linsey MacDonald (GBR)	52.09
7.	Michelle Scutt (GBR)	52.11
8.	Elżbieta Kapusta (POL)	53.83

=== Final ===
Rank	Final	Time
	Marita Koch (GDR)	48.16 WR
	Jarmila Kratochvílová (TCH)	48.85 NR
	Taťána Kocembová (TCH)	50.55
4.	Sabine Busch (GDR)	50.57
5.	Irina Baskakova (URS)	50.58
6.	Dagmar Rübsam (GDR)	50.76
7.	Gaby Bußmann (FRG)	50.93
8.	Judit Forgács (HUN)	52.49
