= 1983 European Athletics Indoor Championships – Women's 400 metres =

The women's 400 metres event at the 1983 European Athletics Indoor Championships was held on 5 and 6 March.

== Medalists ==
| Gold | Silver | Bronze |
|---|---|---|
| Jarmila Kratochvílová; Czechoslovakia | Kirsten Siemon; East Germany | Rositsa Stamenova; Bulgaria |

== Results ==
=== Heats ===
First 2 from each heat (Q) and the next 1 fastest (q) qualified for the final.

| Rank | Heat | Name | Nationality | Time | Notes |
|---|---|---|---|---|---|
| 1 | 1 | Jarmila Kratochvílová | Czechoslovakia | 52.31 | Q |
| 2 | 1 | Rositsa Stamenova | Bulgaria | 52.94 | Q |
| 3 | 2 | Kirsten Siemon | East Germany | 53.09 | Q |
| 4 | 2 | Judit Forgács | Hungary | 53.49 | Q |
| 5 | 1 | Karoline Käfer | Austria | 54.22 | q |
| 6 | 2 | Pauline Mullins | Ireland | 54.23 | |
| 7 | 2 | Alena Bulířová | Czechoslovakia | 54.32 | |
| 8 | 1 | Olga Vladykina | Soviet Union | 57.36 | |

=== Final ===
| Rank | Lane | Name | Nationality | Time | Notes |
|---|---|---|---|---|---|
| 1st place, gold medalist(s) | 3 | Jarmila Kratochvílová | Czechoslovakia | 49.69 | |
| 2nd place, silver medalist(s) | 2 | Kirsten Siemon | East Germany | 51.70 | |
| 3rd place, bronze medalist(s) | 5 | Rositsa Stamenova | Bulgaria | 52.36 | |
| 4 | 1 | Judit Forgács | Hungary | 53.86 | |
| 5 | 4 | Karoline Käfer | Austria | 53.92 | |
