= 1982 European Athletics Championships – Women's 4 × 400 metres relay =

Women's 4 × 400 metres relay at the European Athletics Championships

These are the official results of the Women's 4 × 400 metres event at the 1982 European Championships in Athens, Greece. The final was held at Olympic Stadium "Spiros Louis" on 11 September 1982.

== Medalists ==
Gold	Kirsten Emmelmann; Sabine Busch; Dagmar Rübsam; Marita Koch; East Germany
Silver	Věra Tylová; Milena Matějkovičová; Taťána Kocembová; Jarmila Kratochvílová; Czechoslovakia
Bronze	Yelena Korban; Irina Olkhovnikova; Olga Mineyeva; Irina Baskakova; Soviet Union

== Results ==
=== Final ===
11 September

Rank	Nation	Competitors	Time	Notes
1st place, gold medalist(s)	East Germany	Kirsten Emmelmann; Sabine Busch; Dagmar Rübsam; Marita Koch	3:19.05	WR
2nd place, silver medalist(s)	Czechoslovakia	Věra Tylová; Milena Matějkovičová; Taťána Kocembová; Jarmila Kratochvílová	3:22.17	
3rd place, bronze medalist(s)	Soviet Union	Yelena Korban; Irina Olkhovnikova; Olga Mineyeva; Irina Baskakova	3:22.79	
4	West Germany	Ute Finger; Heike Schmidt; Christiane Brinkmann; Gaby Bussmann	3:25.71	
5	United Kingdom	Kathy Smallwood; Linsey MacDonald; Gladys Taylor; Joslyn Hoyte-Smith	3:25.82	NR
6	Romania	Ibolya Korodi; Cristieana Cojocaru; Elena Tărîță; Daniela Matei	3:29.26	
7	Poland	Elżbieta Kapusta; Grażyna Oliszewska; Jolanta Januchta; Genowefa Błaszak	3:29.32	
8	Sweden	Charlotte Holmström; Ann-Louise Skoglund; Eva-Maria Eriksson; Susanna Bergman	3:35.83	

== Participation ==
According to an unofficial count, 32 athletes from 8 countries participated in the event.

- Czechoslovakia (4)
- East Germany (4)
- Poland (4)
- Romania (4)
- Soviet Union (4)
- Sweden (4)
- United Kingdom (4)
- West Germany (4)

== See also ==
- 1978 Women's European Championships 4 × 400 m Relay (Prague)
- 1980 Women's Olympic 4 × 400 m Relay (Moscow)
- 1983 Women's World Championships 4 × 400 m Relay (Helsinki)
- 1984 Women's Olympic 4 × 400 m Relay (Los Angeles)
- 1986 Women's European Championships 4 × 400 m Relay (Stuttgart)
- 1987 Women's World Championships 4 × 400 m Relay (Rome)
- 1988 Women's Olympic 4 × 400 m Relay (Seoul)
- 1990 Women's European Championships 4 × 400 m Relay (Split)
