= Auhmad Robinson =

American sprinter (born 2001)

Personal information
- Born: June 4, 2001 (age 25)

Sport
- Sport: Athletics
- Event: Sprint

Achievements and titles
- Personal bests: 400m: 44.61 (Gainesville, 2025); Indoor; 200m: 20.57 (College Station, 2025); 300m: 32.34 (College Station, 2025); 400m: 44.91 (Boston, 2024)

Auhmad Robinson (born 4 June 2001) is an American sprinter who primarily competes over 400 metres.

== Biography ==
Robinson attended Klein Forest High School in Texas. In 2019, Klein Forest won the Class 6A Men's Track & Field Team State Championship. At the AAU Junior Olympic Games in 2020, Robinson finished second in the boys 17-18 division of the 200m to Robert Gregory, with a wind legal time of 20.91 seconds, and secured a win over 400 metres in a time of 47.00 seconds. He later attended Stephen F. Austin State University, before transferring to Texas A&M University after a year.

Robinson ran 44.91 seconds for the 400 metres on 9 March 2024 in Boston, as he finished runner-up to Christopher Morales Williams at the 2024 NCAA Indoor Championships. It proved to be the second fastest short track 400 metres time recorded worldwide in 2024. The following month, he ran 44.98 seconds for the 400 metres outdoors at the Tom Jones Memorial in Gainesville, Florida, again finishing runner-up to Morales Williams. In June, he ran the anchor leg as Texas A&M won the 4 x 400 metres relay at the 2024 NCAA Outdoor Championships, although he was disqualified from the final of the individual 400 metres race.

Running a time of 32.34 seconds, Robinson broke the Texas A&M school record for the 300 metres at the McFerrin-12 Degree Invitational in January 2025, a time which placed him third on the NCAA all-time list. Robinson placed third over 400 metres at the 2025 NCAA Indoor Championships in 45.54s, behind Will Floyd and Ezekiel Nathaniel. In April 2025, Robinson lowered his personal best to 44.61 seconds for the 400 metres at the Florida Relays in Gainesville. Robinson was a finalist in the individual 400 metres and secured a second place finish running the anchor leg of the 4 x 400 metres relay, as Texas A&M shared the 2025 NCAA Outdoor Championship overall title with the University of Southern California.
