= 1987 World Championships in Athletics =

Athletics competition in Rome, Italy

2nd World Championships in Athletics
- Host city: Rome, Italy
- Nations: 159
- Athletes: 1451
- Events: 43
- Dates: 28 August – 6 September 1987
- Opened by: President Francesco Cossiga
- Main venue: Stadio Olimpico

The 2nd World Championships in Athletics (Italian: Campionati del mondo di atletica leggera 1987) under the auspices of the International Association of Athletics Federations were held in the Stadio Olimpico in Rome, Italy between August 28 and September 6, 1987.

== Men's results ==
=== Track ===
1983 | 1987 | 1991 | 1993 | 1995

Games	Gold		Silver		Bronze	
100 m	Carl Lewis (USA)	9.93^{1} =WR	Ray Stewart (JAM)	10.08	Linford Christie (GBR)	10.14
200 m	Calvin Smith (USA)	20.16	Gilles Quénéhervé (FRA)	20.16	John Regis (GBR)	20.18
400 m	Thomas Schönlebe (GDR)	44.33; AR	Innocent Egbunike (NGR)	44.56	Butch Reynolds (USA)	44.80
800 m	Billy Konchellah (KEN)	1:43.06; CR	Peter Elliott (GBR)	1:43.41	José Luíz Barbosa (BRA)	1:43.76
1500 m	Abdi Bile (SOM)	3:36.80	José Luis González (ESP)	3:38.03	Jim Spivey (USA)	3:38.82
5000 m	Saïd Aouita (MAR)	13:26.44	Domingos Castro (POR)	13:27.59	Jack Buckner (GBR)	13:27.74
10,000 m	Paul Kipkoech (KEN)	27:38.63; CR	Francesco Panetta (ITA)	27:48.98	Hansjörg Kunze (GDR)	27:50.37
Marathon	Douglas Wakiihuri (KEN)	2:11:48	Hussein Ahmed Salah (DJI)	2:12:30	Gelindo Bordin (ITA)	2:12:40
110 m hurdles	Greg Foster (USA)	13.21	Jon Ridgeon (GBR)	13.29	Colin Jackson (GBR)	13.38
400 m hurdles	Edwin Moses (USA)	47.46; CR	Danny Harris (USA)	47.48	Harald Schmid (FRG)	47.48; AR
3000 m st.	Francesco Panetta (ITA)	8:08.57; CR	Hagen Melzer (GDR)	8:10.32	William Van Dijck (BEL)	8:12.18
20 km walk	Maurizio Damilano (ITA)	1:20:45; CR	Jozef Pribilinec (TCH)	1:21:07	José Marín (ESP)	1:21:24
50 km walk	Hartwig Gauder (GDR)	3:40:53; CR	Ronald Weigel (GDR)	3:41:30	Vyacheslav Ivanenko (URS)	3:44:02
4 × 100 m relay	United States (USA); Lee McRae; Lee McNeill; Harvey Glance; Carl Lewis; Dennis Mitchell*	37.90	Soviet Union (URS); Aleksandr Yevgenyev; Viktor Bryzgin; Vladimir Muravyov; Vladimir Krylov; Andrey Fedoriv*	38.02; AR	Jamaica (JAM); John Mair; Andrew Smith; Clive Wright; Ray Stewart; Greg Meghoo*	38.41
4 × 400 m relay	United States (USA); Danny Everett; Roddie Haley; Antonio McKay; Butch Reynolds; Michael Franks*; Raymond Pierre*	2:57.29; CR	Great Britain (GBR); Derek Redmond; Kriss Akabusi; Roger Black; Phil Brown; Todd Bennett*; Mark Thomas*	2:58.86; AR	Cuba (CUB); Leandro Peñalver; Agustín Pavó; Lázaro Martínez; Roberto Hernández	2:59.16; NR
WR world record | AR area record | CR championship record | GR games record | NR national record | OR Olympic record | PB personal best | SB season best | WL world leading (in a given season)

^{1} Ben Johnson of Canada originally won the gold medal in 9.83, but he was disqualified in September 1989 after he admitted to using steroids between 1981 and 1988.
* Indicates athletes who ran in preliminary rounds.

=== Field ===
1983 | 1987 | 1991 | 1993 | 1995

Games	Gold		Silver		Bronze	
High jump	Patrik Sjöberg (SWE)	2.38; CR	Hennadiy Avdyeyenko (URS) Igor Paklin (URS)	2.38; CR	Not awarded	
Pole vault	Sergey Bubka (URS)	5.85; CR	Thierry Vigneron (FRA)	5.80	Radion Gataullin (URS)	5.80
Long jump	Carl Lewis (USA)	8.67; CR	Robert Emmiyan (URS)	8.53	Larry Myricks (USA)	8.33^{1}
Triple Jump	Khristo Markov (BUL)	17.92; CR and AR	Mike Conley (USA)	17.67	Oleg Sakirkin (URS)	17.43
Shot put	Werner Günthör (SUI)	22.23; CR	Alessandro Andrei (ITA)	21.88	John Brenner (USA)	21.75
Discus throw	Jürgen Schult (GDR)	68.74; CR	John Powell (USA)	66.22	Luis Delís (CUB)	66.02
Hammer throw	Sergey Litvinov (URS)	83.06; CR	Jüri Tamm (URS)	80.84	Ralf Haber (GDR)	80.76
Javelin throw	Seppo Räty (FIN)	83.54; CR	Viktor Yevsyukov (URS)	82.52	Jan Železný (TCH)	82.20
Decathlon	Torsten Voss (GDR)	8680	Siegfried Wentz (FRG)	8461	Pavel Tarnavetskiy (URS)	8375
WR world record | AR area record | CR championship record | GR games record | NR national record | OR Olympic record | PB personal best | SB season best | WL world leading (in a given season)

^{1} Giovanni Evangelisti of Italy originally won the bronze medal with 8.37 m, but it was later determined that Italian field officials had entered a pre-arranged fake result for a jump of 7.85 m. While Evangelisti had no involvement in or knowledge of the fraud, Italian head coach Sandro Donati, who revealed it, was fired.

== Women's results ==
=== Track ===
1983 | 1987 | 1991 | 1993 | 1995

Games	Gold		Silver		Bronze	
100 m	Silke Gladisch (GDR)	10.90; CR	Heike Drechsler (GDR)	11.00	Merlene Ottey (JAM)	11.04
200 m	Silke Gladisch (GDR)	21.74; CR	Florence Griffith (USA)	21.96	Merlene Ottey (JAM)	22.06
400 m	Olga Bryzgina (URS)	49.38	Petra Muller (GDR)	49.94	Kirsten Emmelmann (GDR)	50.20
800 m	Sigrun Wodars (GDR)	1:55.26; NR	Christine Wachtel (GDR)	1:55.32	Lyubov Gurina (URS)	1:55.56
1500 m	Tetyana Samolenko (URS)	3:58.56; CR	Hildegard Körner (GDR)	3:58.67	Doina Melinte (ROU)	3:59.27
3000 m	Tetyana Samolenko (URS)	8:38.73	Maricica Puică (ROU)	8:39.45	Ulrike Bruns (GDR)	8:40.30
10,000 m	Ingrid Kristiansen (NOR)	31:05.85	Yelena Zhupiyeva (URS)	31:09.40	Kathrin Ullrich (GDR)	31:11.34
Marathon	Rosa Mota (POR)	2:25:17; CR	Zoya Ivanova (URS)	2:32:38	Jocelyne Villeton (FRA)	2:32:53
100 m hurdles	Ginka Zagorcheva (BUL)	12.34; CR	Gloria Uibel (GDR)	12.44	Cornelia Oschkenat (GDR)	12.46
400 m hurdles	Sabine Busch (GDR)	53.62; CR	Debbie Flintoff (AUS)	54.19	Cornelia Ullrich (GDR)	54.31
10 km walk	Irina Strakhova (URS)	44:12; CR	Kerry Saxby (AUS)	44:23	Yan Hong (CHN)	44:42
4 × 100 m relay	United States (USA); Alice Brown; Diane Williams; Florence Griffith; Pam Marshall	41.58; CR	East Germany (GDR); Silke Gladisch; Cornelia Oschkenat; Kerstin Behrendt; Marlies Göhr	41.95	Soviet Union (URS); Irina Slyusar; Natalya Pomoschchnikova; Natalya German; Olga Antonova	42.33
4 × 400 m relay	East Germany (GDR); Dagmar Neubauer; Kirsten Emmelmann; Petra Muller; Sabine Busch; Cornelia Ullrich*	3:18.63; CR	Soviet Union (URS); Aelita Yurchenko; Olga Nazarova; Mariya Pinigina; Olga Bryzgina	3:19.50	United States (USA); Diane Dixon; Denean Howard; Valerie Brisco; Lillie Leatherwood	3:21.04
WR world record | AR area record | CR championship record | GR games record | NR national record | OR Olympic record | PB personal best | SB season best | WL world leading (in a given season)

Note: * Indicates athletes who ran in preliminary rounds.

=== Field ===
1983 | 1987 | 1991 | 1993 | 1995

Games	Gold		Silver		Bronze	
High jump	Stefka Kostadinova (BUL)	2.09; WR	Tamara Bykova (URS)	2.04	Susanne Beyer (GDR)	1.99
Long jump	Jackie Joyner-Kersee (USA)	7.36; CR	Yelena Belevskaya (URS)	7.14	Heike Drechsler (GDR)	7.13
Shot put	Natalya Lisovskaya (URS)	21.24; CR	Kathrin Neimke (GDR)	21.21	Ines Müller (GDR)	20.76
Discus throw	Martina Hellmann (GDR)	71.62; CR	Diana Gansky (GDR)	70.12	Tsvetanka Khristova (BUL)	68.82
Javelin throw	Fatima Whitbread (GBR)	76.64; CR	Petra Felke (GDR)	71.76	Beate Peters (FRG)	68.82
Heptathlon	Jackie Joyner-Kersee (USA)	7128; CR	Larisa Nikitina (URS)	6564	Jane Frederick (USA)	6502
WR world record | AR area record | CR championship record | GR games record | NR national record | OR Olympic record | PB personal best | SB season best | WL world leading (in a given season)

== Exhibition events ==
Two exhibition para-athletics events appeared at the competition, but results did not go towards the overall medal count. The two wheelchair races were the first time disability events had appeared at the championships, and were the first exhibition event of any kind to feature at the World Championships in Athletics. This began a tradition of such events which continued until 2011. Wheelchair exhibition events were contested until that year, bar 1999 and 2009.

Games	Gold		Silver		Bronze	
Men's 1500 m wheelchair	Mustapha Badid (FRA)	3:54.32	Lars Lofström (SWE)	3:54.90	Franz Nietlispach (SUI)	3:55.27
Women's 800 m wheelchair	Diane Rakiecki (CAN)	2:32.52	Connie Hansen (DEN)	2:37.07	Ingrid Lauridsen (DEN)	2:39.95

== Medal table ==
* Host nation (Italy)

Rank	Nation	Gold	Silver	Bronze	Total
1	East Germany (GDR)	10	11	10	31
2	United States (USA)	10	4	6	20
3	Soviet Union (URS)	7	12	6	25
4	Bulgaria (BUL)	3	0	1	4
5	Kenya (KEN)	3	0	0	3
6	Italy (ITA)*	2	2	1	5
7	Great Britain (GBR)	1	3	4	8
8	Portugal (POR)	1	1	0	2
9	Finland (FIN)	1	0	0	1
9	Morocco (MAR)	1	0	0	1
9	Norway (NOR)	1	0	0	1
9	Somalia (SOM)	1	0	0	1
9	Sweden (SWE)	1	0	0	1
9	Switzerland (SUI)	1	0	0	1
15	France (FRA)	0	2	1	3
16	Australia (AUS)	0	2	0	2
17	Jamaica (JAM)	0	1	3	4
18	West Germany (FRG)	0	1	2	3
19	Czechoslovakia (TCH)	0	1	1	2
19	Romania (ROU)	0	1	1	2
19	Spain (ESP)	0	1	1	2
22	Djibouti (DJI)	0	1	0	1
22	Nigeria (NGR)	0	1	0	1
24	Cuba (CUB)	0	0	2	2
25	Belgium (BEL)	0	0	1	1
25	Brazil (BRA)	0	0	1	1
25	China (CHN)	0	0	1	1
Totals (27 entries)		43	44	42	129

== See also ==
- 1987 in athletics (track and field)
