= Jarmila Kratochvílová =

Czech track and field athlete (born 1951)

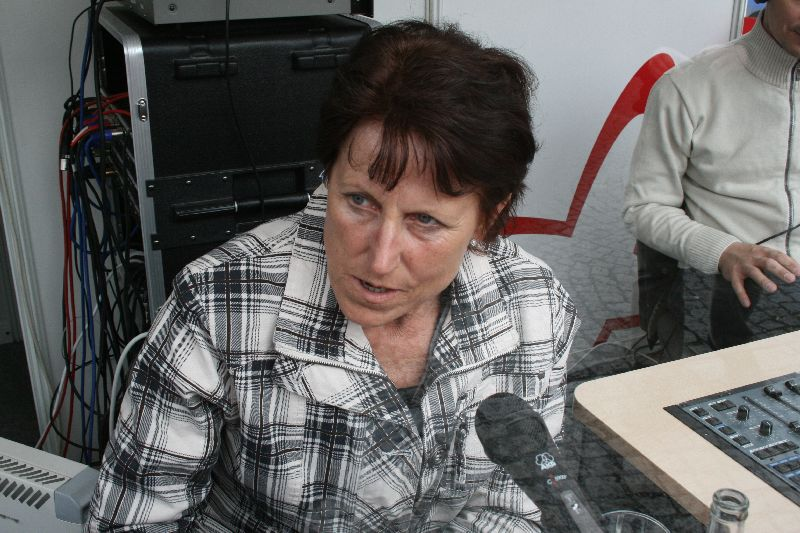
- Kratochvílová in 2010

Personal information
- Nationality: Czechoslovakia
- Born: 26 January 1951 (age 75) Golčův Jeníkov, Czechoslovakia
- Height: 1.71 m (5 ft 7 in)
- Weight: 68 kg (150 lb)

Sport
- Sport: Track and field
- Events: 400 metres, 800 metres
- Club: VŠ Praha
- Coached by: Miroslav Kváč
- Retired: 1987

Achievements and titles
- Personal bests: Long track (Note: Best from outdoor 400-metre track (long track) only); 100 m: 11.09 (1981); 200 m: 21.97 (1981, NR); 400 m: 47.99 (1983, NR) (Note: Former World Record); 800 m: 1:53.28 (1983, WR); Short track (Note: On 1 November 2023, World Athletics replaced the term 'indoor' with 'short track' for the indoor events that take place on 200-metre tracks.); 200 m: 22.76 i (1981, NR); 400 m: 49.59 i (1982, NR)
Medal record
Women's athletics
Representing Czechoslovakia
Event	1st	2nd	3rd
Olympic Games	0	1	0
World Championships	2	1	0
European Championships	0	2	0
European Indoor Championships	4	1	0
Total	6	5	0
Event	1st	2nd	3rd
200 m	1	0	0
400 m	4	3	0
800 m	1	0	0
4 × 400 m relay	0	2	0
Total	6	5	0
Olympic Games
Silver medal – second place	1980 Moscow	400 m
World Championships
Gold medal – first place	1983 Helsinki	400 m
Gold medal – first place	1983 Helsinki	800 m
Silver medal – second place	1983 Helsinki	4 × 400 m relay
European Championships
Silver medal – second place	1982 Athens	400 m
Silver medal – second place	1982 Athens	4 × 400 m relay
European Indoor Championships
Gold medal – first place	1981 Grenoble	400 m
Gold medal – first place	1982 Milan	400 m
Gold medal – first place	1983 Budapest	400 m
Gold medal – first place	1984 Gothenburg	200 m
Silver medal – second place	1979 Vienna	400 m

Jarmila Kratochvílová (Czech pronunciation: [ˈjarmɪla ˈkratoxviːlovaː]; born 26 January 1951 in Golčův Jeníkov) is a Czechoslovak former track and field athlete. She was the 1980 Olympic silver medalist in the 400 metres. In 1983, she set the world record for the 800 metres, which still stands and is currently the longest-standing world record in athletics. Only three athletes, Pamela Jelimo of Kenya (2008), Caster Semenya of South Africa (2018), and Audrey Werro of Switzerland (2026) have come within a second of Kratochvílová's mark since it was set.

A two-time World Champion, Kratochvílová won the 400 metres and 800 metres at the 1983 World Athletics Championships, setting a world record in the 400 m, which stood for two years. She also won a silver medal in the 4 × 400 metres relay at the same championships.

Kratochvílová also competed in indoor events. In 1982 she set the world indoor record in the 400 metres of 49.59 seconds; a record which stood until 2023.

== Career ==
=== Early career ===
Kratochvílová's first major event in 1979 took place in February. At the 1979 European Athletics Indoor Championships in Vienna, she ran the 400 metres in 51.81 seconds, breaking her own national record, and winning a silver medal as she finished in second place, just 0.01 seconds behind British runner Verona Elder. Kratochvílová was one of four athletes from her country to be selected for the second IAAF World Cup, held in August 1979. As two team-mates were only non-competing reserves, only she and shot put silver medalist Helena Fibingerová actually participated. She raced for Europe in the 4 × 400 m relay. Alongside Karoline Käfer, Elke Decker and Irena Szewińska, the Europe team finished the final in a time of 3:27.4, the same as the third-placed United States team, and seven seconds behind winners East Germany.

=== 1980: Moscow Olympic silver medalist ===
Kratochvílová was part of the Czechoslovak delegation at the 1980 Summer Olympics. She finished third in the semi-final of the 400 metres, after coasting for the last 50 metres of the race. She went on to win a silver medal the following day in the final, finishing behind world record holder Marita Koch. Her time of 49.46 seconds was the first time she'd completed the distance under 50 seconds and set a new national record.

=== 1981: First world indoor 400 m record, multiple distance national records ===
In January 1981, Kratochvílová broke the world indoor record over 400 metres at an international meeting in Vienna, finishing in 49.64 seconds. On 6 June 1981, Kratochvílová took part in the Pravda-Televise-Slovnaft meeting at Štadión Pasienky in Bratislava. At 16:50 local time she won the 100 metres in a personal best time of 11.09 seconds, also setting a new national record, in a race which included 1980 Olympic bronze medallist, Merlene Ottey. She later lined up in the 200 metres event at 18:25, again winning the event, and setting a second national record that day with a time of 21.97 seconds. In September that year, Kratochvílová participated in the 1981 IAAF World Cup, held at the Stadio Olimpico in Rome. She finished second to American Evelyn Ashford in the 200 metres final, finishing in 22.31 seconds. An hour and a half later, Kratochvílová ran the anchor leg of the 4 × 400 m relay in a Europe team with Brits Michelle Scutt, Verona Elder and Joslyn Hoyte-Smith, which finished second behind the team of East Germany. In the 400 metres, held on the Sunday evening, she finished ahead of Olympic champion and world record holder Koch and Jacqueline Pusey of Jamaica to win in 48.61 seconds, setting a meeting record, as well as a national record in the process.

=== 1982: Second world indoor 400 m record ===
In March 1982, Kratochvílová won gold in the 400 metres at the 1982 European Athletics Indoor Championships in Milan, ahead of Dagmar Rübsam of East Germany and Gaby Bußmann of West Germany. Her time of 49.59 seconds beat her previous best by 0.05 seconds and set a new indoor world record. September 1982 brought the European Championships in Athens. Kratochvílová ran in lane 2 in the semi-finals of the 400 metres, slowing down in the second half of the race but still winning it. The following day she finished second in the final behind Koch, who overtook her after 250 metres, on the way to setting a new world record in the race. Kratochvílová, who finished the event in her second best ever time, took the silver medal ahead of compatriot Taťána Kocembová. Days later, Kratochvílová was part of the Czechoslovakia team which ran a national record time of 3:22.17 in the 4 × 400 m relay to win another silver medal, behind the East Germany quartet, who finished first in world record time.

=== 1983: World 800 m record, world 400 m record and double world champion ===
In July 1983, Kratochvílová broke the 800 m world record in the Olympic Stadium in Munich, with a time of 1:53.28. At the inaugural World Championships, held in Helsinki in August of the same year, she set a world record of 47.99 seconds to win the 400 m. Despite the 800 metres final taking place just half an hour after the semi-finals for the 400 metres, she won gold in the 800 metres, running the third fastest-ever recorded time of 1:54.68. Her third medal of the championships came in the 4 × 400 m relay, winning silver with Czechoslovakia.

=== Later career ===
Due to the 1984 Summer Olympics boycott, Czechoslovakia did not send a delegation to the 1984 Summer Olympics in American city Los Angeles and Kratochvílová had no opportunity to compete. Her first biography, co-written with coach Miroslav Kváč, was released in 1985. She finished her active career in 1987.

== Legacy ==
Kratochvílová's 1983 400-metre world record of 47.99 seconds stood for two years until it was broken by her great rival Marita Koch in October 1985. Koch's 400-metre world record of 47.60 seconds is still the current world record.

Kratochvílová's 1982 world record on an indoor track—49.59—stood until 19 February 2023 when the 400-metre indoor world record was broken by Femke Bol from the Netherlands with a time of 49.26.

Her 800-metre world record is the longest-standing unshared track record in men or women's athletics, and it was described by 1996 Olympic champion Svetlana Masterkova as "... very fast. It's impossible for women to run so fast. It will last for 100 years."

Kratochvílová was a late developer, not breaking 53 seconds for the 400 metres until she was 27, and she was 32 when she set her world records.

== Allegations of drug use ==
Her remarkably fast times and her atypical muscular physique spawned rumours of illegal drug use. Kratochvílová has maintained her innocence, and although in 2006 the Prague newspaper Mladá fronta DNES claimed to have uncovered a doping program run by the government of Czechoslovakia, there was no link to Kratochvílová despite her being her country's highest-profile athlete. She and her coach of 20 years, Miroslav Kváč, maintain that it was rigorous training and high doses of vitamin B_{12} that account for her records, a claim treated with scepticism by several anti-doping campaigners. In 2017, she criticized a proposal by European Athletics to remove suspicion about drug-taking by voiding all world records set before 2005.

== Post-retirement ==
Since her retirement, Kratochvílová has worked as an athletics coach and with the Czech national team. She trained Ludmila Formanová, who also became world champion in 800 metres, in 1999. In 2013 a second biography about her, Fenomén Jarmila, was published. As well as her racing career, the book details her later life as an athletics coach.

== Honours and awards ==
Kratochvílová was named Sportsperson of the Year for Czechoslovakia twice: in 1981 and again in 1983. Further awards she won in 1983 included European Sportsperson of the Year, as well as American magazine Track & Field News naming her Athlete of the Year.

Kratochvílová was awarded the Kamenná medaile (Stone Medal) by her native Vysočina Region in 2009. She received the Medal of Merit from Czech president Miloš Zeman in October 2013.

== Bibliography ==
- Čekání (1985, Olympia)
- Fenomén Jarmila (2013, Imagination of People)

== Notes ==
Records
Preceded by Marita Koch	Women's 400 metres World Record holder 1983-08-10 - 1985-10-06	Succeeded by Marita Koch
Preceded by Nadezhda Olizarenko	Women's 800 metres World Record holder 1983-07-26 —	Succeeded by Incumbent
Awards
Preceded by Marita Koch	United Press International; Athlete of the Year; 1983	Succeeded by Martina Navratilova
Preceded by Marita Koch	Women's Track & Field Athlete of the Year; 1983	Succeeded by Evelyn Ashford
