= Petra Schersing =

East German sprinter

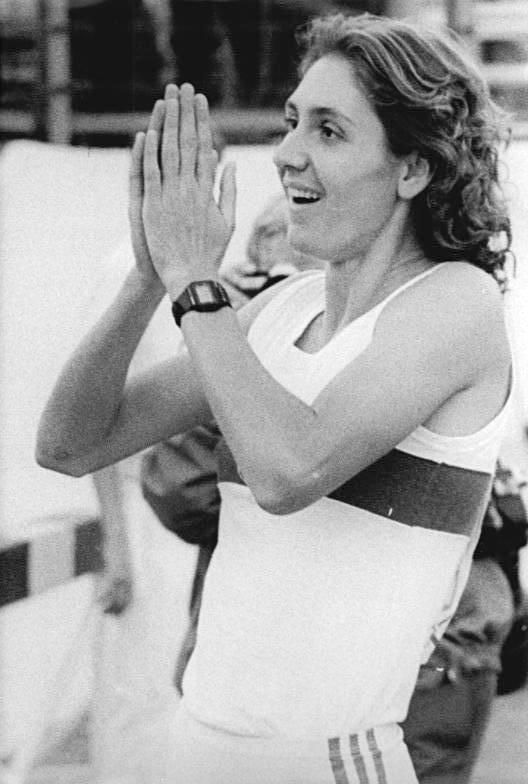
- Schersing in 1988

Medal record

Women's athletics

Representing East Germany

Olympic Games
Silver medal – second place	1988 Seoul	400 m
Bronze medal – third place	1988 Seoul	4×400 m

World Championships
Gold medal – first place	1987 Rome	4×400 m
Silver medal – second place	1987 Rome	400 m

European Championships
Gold medal – first place	1986 Stuttgart	4×400 m
Gold medal – first place	1990 Split	4×400 m
Silver medal – second place	1990 Split	400 m
Bronze medal – third place	1986 Stuttgart	400 m

Petra Schersing (née Müller, born 18 July 1965 in Quedlinburg) is a retired East German sprinter who specialised in the 400 metres. She represented sports club SC Chemie Halle and was coached by Harold Werner. At the 1988 Olympic Games in Seoul, she won a silver medal in the 400 metres and a bronze medal in the 4×400 metres relay.

== Biography ==
As Petra Muller, she first achieved international recognition, when she became the 1983 European Junior Champion at 400 metres. She also won a gold medal in the 4 × 400 m relay.

In 1986, at the European Indoor Championships, she won a silver medal behind teammate Sabine Busch. Later that year at the European Championships in Stuttgart, she won a bronze medal in the individual 400 metres and a gold medal in the relay, with teammates Kirsten Emmelmann, Sabine Busch and Marita Koch.

At the 1987 World Indoor Championships in Indianapolis, she surprisingly failed to reach the final. At the 1987 World Championships in Rome she won a silver medal in the 400 m behind Olga Bryzgina as well as another relay gold medal alongside Dagmar Neubauer, Emmelmann and Busch.

Muller won her biggest individual title in 1988, when she became the European Indoor Champion in 50.28 secs, which at the time ranked her fourth on the indoor all-time list. At the 1988 Olympics she won the silver medal in the 400 m, between Soviets Olga Bryzgina (gold) and Olga Nazarova (bronze). She also won the bronze medal in the 4 × 400 m relay, with teammates Neubauer, Emmelmann and Busch.

In 1990, now competing as Petra Schersing, she won a silver medal at the European Championships in Split, finishing behind her teenage teammate Grit Breuer and won a gold medal in the relay, with new teammates Manuela Derr, Annett Hesselbarth and Breuer.

Schersing's personal best time in the 400 metres is 49.30 seconds, achieved in June 1988 in Jena, which at that time placed her tenth on the all-time list. She won the East German National 400 m title three times (1986–1988) and twice won the East German indoor 400 m title (1986, 1988).

As of 2013, Schersing's Outdoor best (49.30) is 21st on the World all-time list and third on the German all-time list, only behind Marita Koch and Sabine Busch., while her indoor best (50.28) is tenth on the World indoor all-time list and second on the German indoor all-time list, behind Sabine Busch.

In October 1988, she married fellow Olympic sprinter Mathias Schersing.

== International competitions ==
Year	Competition	Venue	Position	Event	Notes
Representing East Germany
1983	European Junior Championships	Schwechat, Austria	1st	400 m	51.79 secs
1983	European Junior Championships	Schwechat, Austria	1st	4 × 400 m	3:30.44
1986	European Indoor Championships	Madrid, Spain	2nd	400 m	51.59
1986	European Championships	Stuttgart, West Germany	3rd	400 m	49.88
1986	European Championships	Stuttgart, West Germany	1st	4 × 400 m	3:16.87
1987	World Indoor Championships	Indianapolis, United States	semifinal	400 m	52.92
1987	World Championships	Rome, Italy	2nd	400 m	49.94
1987	World Championships	Rome, Italy	1st	4 × 400 m	3:18.63
1988	European Indoor Championships	Budapest, Hungary	1st	400 m	50.28
1988	Olympic Games	Seoul, South Korea	2nd	400 m	49.42
1988	Olympic Games	Seoul, South Korea	3rd	4 × 400 m	3:18.29
1990	European Championships	Split, Yugoslavia	2nd	400 m	50.51
1990	European Championships	Split, Yugoslavia	1st	4 × 400 m	3:21.02
