= Sabine Busch =

East German athlete

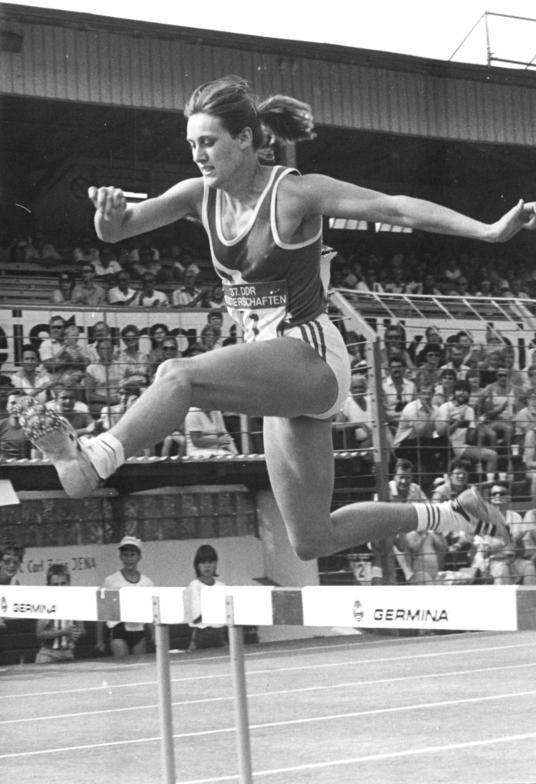

Medal record

Women's athletics

Representing East Germany

Olympic Games
Bronze medal – third place	1988 Seoul	4×400 m

World Championships
Gold medal – first place	1983 Helsinki	4×400 m
Gold medal – first place	1987 Rome	400 m hurdles
Gold medal – first place	1987 Rome	4×400 m

European Championships
Gold medal – first place	1982 Athens	4×400 m
Gold medal – first place	1986 Stuttgart	4×400 m
Silver medal – second place	1986 Stuttgart	400 m hurdles

Sabine Busch (later Ascui; born 21 November 1962, in Erfurt) is a retired East German athlete, who specialised in the 400 metres and the 400 metres hurdles. In 1987, she became the World Champion at 400 m hurdles and the World Indoor Champion at 400 m.

== Biography ==
At the 1982 European Championships she finished fourth in the 400 m, before winning a gold medal in the 4 × 400 metres relay, together with teammates Kirsten Siemon, Dagmar Rubsam and Marita Koch. At the 1983 World Championships she finished fifth in her 400 m semifinal and was eliminated, but won another gold medal in the relay, with teammates Gesine Walther, Koch and Rübsam. She set her 400 m lifetime best of 49.24 in Erfurt in June 1984, but could not compete in the 1984 Olympics due to the Eastern Bloc Boycott.

Busch switched to the 400 m hurdles in 1985, with immediate success, winning the European Cup in Moscow in 54.13 secs, before breaking Margarita Ponomaryova's world record of 53.58, with 53.55 in Berlin in September. She ended the season by winning at the World Cup in Canberra in 54.44.

Busch began 1986 by winning the 400 m title at the European Indoor Championships for the second time, having also won the 1985 Event. At the 1986 European Championships in Stuttgart, she won a silver medal in the 400 m hurdles, losing to Marina Stepanova, who in the process broke Busch's world record with 53.32, Busch ran 53.60. She won a gold medal in the relay with Emmelmann (Siemon), Petra Muller and Koch.

In 1987, Busch won the 400 m title at the World Indoor Championships in Indianapolis. The highlight of her career came at the 1987 World Championships in Rome, where she won a clear victory in the 400 m hurdles in 53.62 secs, to become world champion. She won a second gold medal in the relay with Emmelmann, Neubauer (Rubsam) and Muller. At the 1988 Olympic Games in Seoul she finished fourth in the final of the 400 m hurdles, being edged out of the bronze medal by her GDR teammate Ellen Fiedler (53.63 – 53.69). She did win a bronze medal in the relay alongside her teammates Neubauer, Emmelmann and Muller.

In 1991, Busch represented a United Germany at the World Championships in Tokyo, where she was eliminated in the semi-finals in 55.93 secs.

Busch's career best time at the 400 m hurdles was 53.24 seconds, achieved in August 1987 in Potsdam. As of 2024, this is still the German record. Her personal best time in the 400 metres of 49.24 seconds, places her second on the German all-time list, only behind Marita Koch. On the world all-time lists, she ranks 16th at 400 m and 24th at 400 m hurdles.

Busch represented the sports club SC Turbine Erfurt and was coached by Eberhard König.

Sporting positions
Preceded by (Soviet Union) Margarita Ponomaryova	Women's 400 m Hurdles Best Year Performance; 1985	Succeeded by (Soviet Union) Marina Stepanova
Preceded by (Soviet Union) Marina Stepanova	Women's 400 m Hurdles Best Year Performance; 1987	Succeeded by (Australia) Debbie Flintoff-King
