= 400 metres =

Sprint running event

Athletics 400 metres
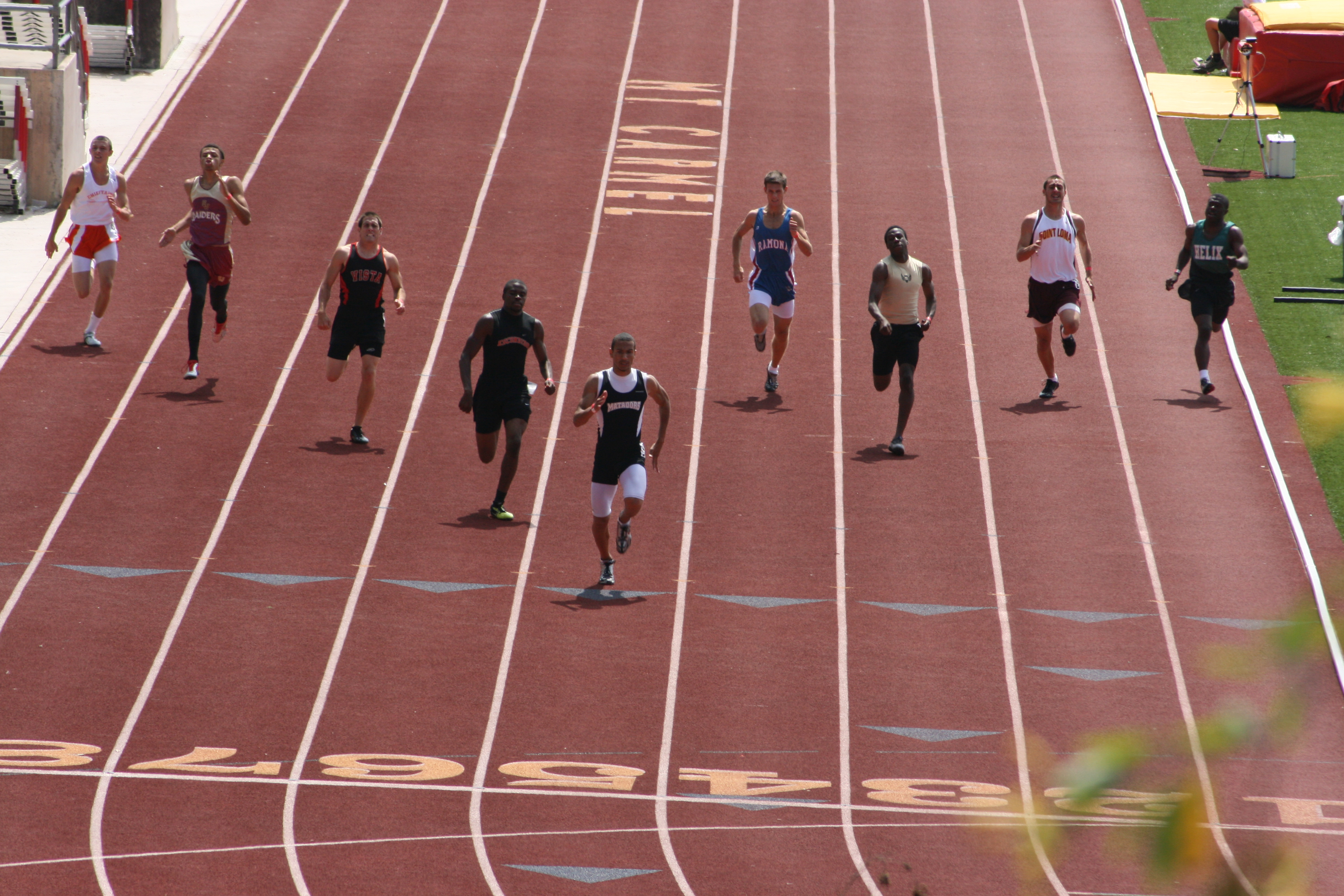
- The closing stages of a men's 400 m race

World records
- Men: Wayde van Niekerk (RSA) 43.03 (2016)
- Women: Marita Koch (GDR) 47.60 (1985)

Short track world records
- Men: Kerron Clement (USA) 44.57 (2005)
- Women: Femke Bol (NED) 49.17 (2024)

Olympic records
- Men: Wayde van Niekerk (RSA) 43.03 (2016)
- Women: Marileidy Paulino (DOM) 48.17 (2024)

World Championship records
- Men: Michael Johnson (USA) 43.18 (1999)
- Women: Sydney McLaughlin-Levrone (USA) 47.78 (2025)

World junior (U20) records
- Men: Steve Lewis (USA) 43.87 (1988)
- Women: Grit Breuer (GER) 49.42 (1991)

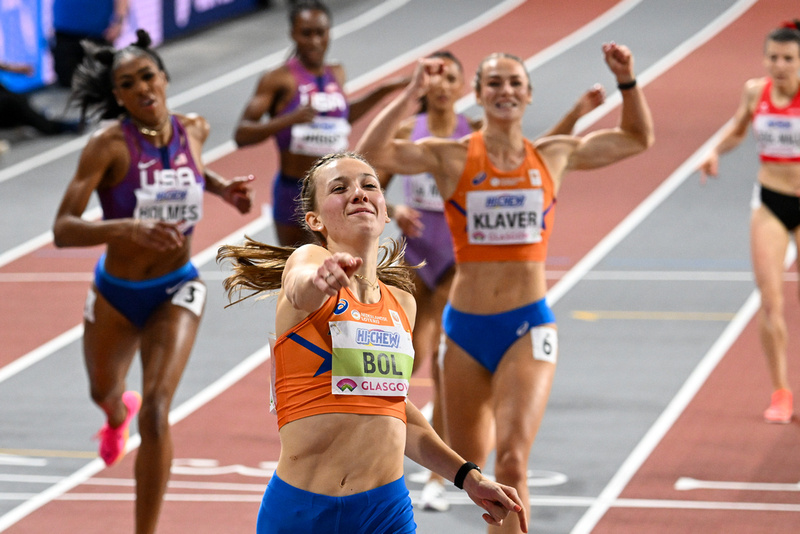
Femke Bol when she broke the world record in the 400 metres short track during the 2024 World Indoor Championships

The 400 metres, or 400-meter dash, is a sprint event in track and field competitions. It has been featured in the athletics programme at the Summer Olympics since 1896 for men and since 1964 for women. On a standard outdoor running track, it is one lap around the track. Runners start in staggered positions and race in separate lanes for the entire course. In many countries, athletes previously competed in the 440-yard dash (402.336 m)—which is a quarter of a mile (1,760 yards) and was referred to as the "quarter-mile"—instead of the 400 m (437.445 yards), though this distance is now obsolete.

The current men's world record and Olympic record is held by Wayde van Niekerk of South Africa; his time of 43.03 seconds is the fastest ever run in an open 400 m. While Lythe Pillay holds the fastest 400 m relay split with a time of 42.66, relay splits are typically faster because athletes have a running start and do not need to react to the gun if they are not the leadoff leg. Considering van Niekerk's reaction time of 0.181 seconds in his run of 43.03, van Niekerk covered the 400-metre distance itself in 42.85 seconds, therefore being 0.19 seconds slower than Pillay's relay split.

Quincy Hall is the reigning men's Olympic champion. Collen Kebinatshipi is the current men's world champion. Kerron Clement is the men's world indoor record holder with a time of 44.57 seconds. The current women's world record is held by Marita Koch, with a time of 47.60 seconds. Sydney McLaughlin-Levrone is the current women's world champion, holding the championship record of 47.78 seconds. Marileidy Paulino is the women's Olympic champion, and holds the Olympic record in a time of 48.17 seconds. Femke Bol holds the women's world indoor record at 49.17 (2024). The men's T43 Paralympic world record of 45.07 seconds is held by Oscar Pistorius.

An Olympic double of 200 metres and 400 m was first achieved by Valerie Brisco-Hooks in 1984, and later by Marie-José Pérec of France and Michael Johnson from the United States on the same evening in 1996. Alberto Juantorena of Cuba at the 1976 Summer Olympics became the first and so far the only athlete to win both the 400 m and 800 m Olympic titles. Pérec became the first to defend the Olympic title in 1996, Johnson became the first and only man to do so in 2000.

== Sprint ==
Like other sprint disciplines, the 400 m involves the use of starting blocks. The runners take up position in the blocks on the "ready" command, adopt a more efficient starting posture which isometrically preloads their muscles on the "set" command, and stride forwards from the blocks upon hearing the starter's pistol. The blocks allow the runners to begin more powerfully and thereby contribute to their overall sprint speed capability. Maximum sprint speed capability is a significant contributing factor to success in the event, but athletes also require substantial speed endurance and the ability to cope well with high amounts of lactic acid to sustain a fast speed over a whole lap. While considered to be predominantly an anaerobic event, there is some aerobic involvement and the degree of aerobic training required for 400-metre athletes is open to debate.

== Area records ==
- Updated 19 May 2026.

Area	Men			Women		
Area	Time (s)	Season	Athlete	Time (s)	Season	Athlete
World	43.03	2016	Wayde van Niekerk (RSA)	47.60	1985	Marita Koch (GDR)
Area records
Africa (records)	43.03	2016	Wayde van Niekerk (RSA)	49.10	1996	Falilat Ogunkoya (NGR)
Asia (records)	43.93	2015	Yousef Masrahi (KSA)	48.14	2019	Salwa Eid Naser (BHR)
Europe (records)	43.44	2024	Matthew Hudson-Smith (GBR)	47.60	1985	Marita Koch (GDR)
North, Central America and Caribbean (records)	43.18	1999	Michael Johnson (USA)	47.78	2025	Sydney McLaughlin-Levrone (USA)
Oceania (records)	44.38	1988	Darren Clark (AUS)	48.63	1996	Cathy Freeman (AUS)
South America (records)	43.93	2021	Anthony Zambrano (COL)	49.64	1992	Ximena Restrepo (COL)

== All-time top 25 ==
Tables show data for two definitions of "Top 25" - the top 25 400 m times and the top 25 athletes:
- denotes top performance for athletes in the top 25 400 m times
- denotes lesser performances, still in the top 25 400 m times, by repeat athletes
- denotes top performance (only) for other top 25 athletes who fall outside the top 25 400 m times

=== Men (outdoor) ===
- Correct as of September 2026.

Ath.#	Perf.#	Time (s)	Reaction (s)	Athlete	Nation	Date	Place	Ref.
1	1	43.03	0.181	Wayde van Niekerk	South Africa	14 August 2016	Rio de Janeiro	
2	2	43.18	0.150	Michael Johnson	United States	26 August 1999	Seville	
3	3	43.29		Butch Reynolds	United States	17 August 1988	Zürich	
4	4	43.38		Samuel Ogazi	Nigeria	12 June 2026	Eugene	
	5	43.39		Johnson #2		9 August 1995	Gothenburg	
5	5	43.39	0.169	Collen Kebinatshipi	Botswana	12 September 2026	Budapest	
6	7	43.40	0.168	Quincy Hall	United States	7 August 2024	Saint-Denis	
	7	43.40	0.164	Kebinatshipi #2		4 September 2026	Brussels	
	9	43.44		Johnson #3		19 June 1996	Atlanta	
7	9	43.44	0.149	Matthew Hudson-Smith	Great Britain	7 August 2024	Saint-Denis	
	9	43.44	0.173	Kebinatshipi #3		10 July 2026	Monaco	
8	12	43.45	0.182	Jeremy Wariner	United States	31 August 2007	Osaka	
8	12	43.45		Michael Norman	United States	20 April 2019	Torrance	
	14	43.48	0.156	van Niekerk #2		26 August 2015	Beijing	
10	14	43.48	0.164	Steven Gardiner	Bahamas	4 October 2019	Doha	
	16	43.49		Johnson #4		29 July 1996	Atlanta	
11	17	43.50		Quincy Watts	United States	5 August 1992	Barcelona	
	17	43.50		Wariner #2		7 August 2007	Stockholm	
	19	43.53	0.134	Kebinatshipi #4		18 September 2025	Tokyo	
	20	43.54		Kebinatshipi #5		28 June 2026	Paris	
	21	43.56		Norman #2		25 June 2022	Eugene	
	22	43.59	0.163	Kebinatshipi #6		23 August 2026	Chorzów	
	23	43.60	0.130	Norman #3		28 May 2022	Eugene	
	24	43.61		Norman #4		8 June 2018	Eugene	
	25	43.61	0.145	Kebinatshipi #7		16 September 2025	Tokyo	
12		43.64		Fred Kerley	United States	27 July 2019	Des Moines	
13		43.65	0.195	LaShawn Merritt	United States	26 August 2015	Beijing	
14		43.68	0.167	Jereem Richards	Trinidad and Tobago	4 September 2026	Brussels	
15		43.70		Champion Allison	United States	25 June 2022	Eugene	
16		43.72		Isaac Makwala	Botswana	5 July 2015	La Chaux-de-Fonds	
17		43.74	0.172	Kirani James	Grenada	3 July 2014	Lausanne	
17		43.74	0.185	Muzala Samukonga	Zambia	7 August 2024	Saint-Denis	
19		43.76 A		Zakithi Nene	South Africa	31 May 2025	Nairobi	
20		43.78	0.188	Jacory Patterson	United States	4 September 2026	Brussels	
21		43.81		Danny Everett	United States	26 June 1992	New Orleans	
22		43.83	0.171	Rai Benjamin	United States	23 August 2026	Chorzów	
23		43.85		Randolph Ross	United States	11 June 2021	Eugene	
24		43.86 A		Lee Evans	United States	18 October 1968	Mexico City	
25		43.87		Steve Lewis	United States	28 September 1988	Seoul	

=== Women (outdoor) ===
- Correct as of August 2026.

Ath.#	Perf.#	Time (s)	Reaction (s)	Athlete	Nation	Date	Place	Ref.
1	1	47.60		Marita Koch	East Germany	6 October 1985	Canberra	
2	2	47.78	0.171	Sydney McLaughlin-Levrone	United States	18 September 2025	Tokyo	
3	3	47.98	0.183	Marileidy Paulino	Dominican Republic	18 September 2025	Tokyo	
4	4	47.99		Jarmila Kratochvílová	Czechoslovakia	10 August 1983	Helsinki	
5	5	48.14	0.186	Salwa Eid Naser	Bahrain	3 October 2019	Doha	
	6	48.16		Koch #2		8 September 1982	Athens	
	6	48.16		Koch #3		16 August 1984	Prague	
	8	48.17		Paulino #2		9 August 2024	Saint-Denis	
	9	48.19	0.189	Naser #2		18 September 2025	Tokyo	
	10	48.22		Koch #4		28 August 1986	Stuttgart	
6	11	48.25		Marie-José Pérec	France	29 July 1996	Atlanta	
	12	48.26		Koch #5		27 July 1984	Dresden	
7	13	48.27		Olga Bryzgina	Soviet Union	6 October 1985	Canberra	
	14	48.29		McLaughlin-Levrone #2		16 September 2025	Tokyo	
8	15	48.36		Shaunae Miller-Uibo	Bahamas	6 August 2021	Tokyo	
	16	48.37	0.145	Miller-Uibo #2		3 October 2019	Doha	
	17	48.45		Kratochvílová #2		23 July 1983	Prague	
	18	48.48		Paulino #3		28 June 2026	Paris	
	19	48.53		Naser #3		9 August 2024	Saint-Denis	
9	20	48.57		Nickisha Pryce	Jamaica	20 July 2024	London	
10	21	48.59		Taťána Kocembová	Czechoslovakia	10 August 1983	Helsinki	
	22	48.60		Koch #6		4 August 1979	Turin	
	22	48.60		Bryzgina #2		17 August 1985	Moscow	
	24	48.61		Kratochvílová #3		6 September 1981	Rome	
11	25	48.63		Cathy Freeman	Australia	29 July 1996	Atlanta	
12		48.70		Sanya Richards-Ross	United States	16 September 2006	Athens	
13		48.78		Henriette Jæger	Norway	18 September 2026	London	
14		48.79		Dejanea Oakley	Jamaica	13 June 2026	Eugene	
15		48.83		Valerie Brisco-Hooks	United States	6 August 1984	Los Angeles	
16		48.84	0.213	Aaliyah Butler	United States	10 July 2026	Monaco	
17		48.89		Ana Guevara	Mexico	27 August 2003	Saint-Denis	
18		48.90		Natalia Kaczmarek	Poland	20 July 2024	London	
19		48.97		Madison Whyte	United States	13 June 2026	Eugene	
20		49.05		Chandra Cheeseborough	United States	6 August 1984	Los Angeles	
21		49.07		Tonique Williams-Darling	Bahamas	12 September 2004	Berlin	
21		49.07		Rhasidat Adeleke	Ireland	10 June 2024	Rome	
23		49.10		Falilat Ogunkoya	Nigeria	29 July 1996	Atlanta	
24		49.11		Olga Nazarova	Soviet Union	25 September 1988	Seoul	
25		49.13		Britton Wilson	United States	13 May 2023	Baton Rouge	
25		49.13		Kaylyn Brown	United States	8 June 2024	Eugene	

==== Annulled marks ====
- Christine Mboma ran 48.54 in Bydgoszcz on 30 June 2021, but her performance was removed from the World Athletics database due to testosterone regulations in women's athletics.

=== Men (indoor) ===
- Correct as of March 2026.

Ath.#	Perf.#	Time (s)	Athlete	Nation	Date	Place	Ref.
1	1	44.49	Christopher Morales Williams	Canada	24 February 2024	Fayetteville	
2	2	44.52	Michael Norman	United States	10 March 2018	College Station	
2	2	44.52	Khaleb McRae	United States	13 February 2026	Fayetteville	
4	4	44.57	Kerron Clement	United States	12 March 2005	Fayetteville	
4	4	44.57	Samuel Ogazi	Nigeria	14 March 2026	Fayetteville	
6	6	44.62	Randolph Ross	United States	12 March 2022	Birmingham	
6	6	44.62	Jonathan Simms	United States	10 January 2026	Clemson	
8	8	44.63	Michael Johnson	United States	4 March 1995	Atlanta	
	9	44.66	Johnson #2		2 March 1996	Atlanta	
	10	44.67	Morales Williams #2		7 March 2024	Boston	
9	10	44.67	Justin Braun	United States	14 March 2026	Fayetteville	
10	12	44.70	Christopher Bailey	United States	14 February 2025	Fayetteville	
11	13	44.71	Noah Williams	United States	13 March 2021	Fayetteville	
	14	44.72	Ogazi #2		28 February 2026	College Station	
12	15	44.74	Ezekiel Nathaniel	Nigeria	1 March 2025	Lubbock	
13	16	44.75	Elija Godwin	United States	25 February 2023	Fayetteville	
	17	44.75 A	Godwin #2		11 March 2023	Albuquerque	
	18	44.76	Morales Williams #3		21 March 2026	Toruń	
14	19	44.80	Kirani James	Grenada	27 February 2011	Fayetteville	
	20	44.80	Morales Williams #4		13 February 2026	Clemson	
15	21	44.82	Tyrell Richard	United States	9 March 2019	Birmingham	
	22	44.83	Ross #2		11 February 2022	Clemson	
16	23	44.85	Fred Kerley	United States	11 March 2017	College Station	
16	23	44.85	Jordan Pierre	United States	14 March 2026	Fayetteville	
	23	44.85 A	Ogazi #2		7 February 2026	Albuquerque	
18		44.86	Akeem Bloomfield	Jamaica	10 March 2018	College Station	
19		44.88	Bralon Taplin	Grenada	3 February 2018	College Station	
20		44.91	Auhmad Robinson	United States	9 March 2024	Boston	
21		44.93	LaShawn Merritt	United States	11 February 2005	Fayetteville	
21		44.93 A	Ryan Willie	United States	11 March 2023	Albuquerque	
23		44.95	Jayden Davis	United States	1 March 2025	Lubbock	
24		45.00	Jereem Richards	Trinidad and Tobago	19 March 2022	Belgrade	
25		45.01	Attila Molnár	Hungary	3 February 2026	Ostrava	

=== Women (indoor) ===
- Correct as of March 2026.

Ath.#	Perf.#	Time (s)	Athlete	Nation	Date	Place	Ref.
1	1	49.17	Femke Bol	Netherlands	2 March 2024	Glasgow	
	2	49.24	Bol #2		18 February 2024	Apeldoorn	
2	2	49.24	Isabella Whittaker	United States	15 March 2025	Virginia Beach	
	4	49.26	Bol #3		19 February 2023	Apeldoorn	
3	5	49.48 A	Britton Wilson	United States	11 March 2023	Albuquerque	
4	6	49.59	Jarmila Kratochvílová	Czechoslovakia	7 March 1982	Milan	
	7	49.63	Bol #4		10 February 2024	Liévin	
	8	49.64	Kratochvílová #2		28 January 1981	Vienna	
5	9	49.68	Natalya Nazarova	Russia	18 February 2004	Moscow	
	10	49.69	Kratochvílová #3		6 March 1983	Budapest	
	10	49.69	Bol #5		1 February 2024	Metz	
6	12	49.76	Taťána Kocembová	Czechoslovakia	2 February 1984	Vienna	
7	13	49.78	Aaliyah Butler	United States	1 March 2025	College Station	
	14	49.85	Bol #6		4 March 2023	Istanbul	
	15	49.90	Whittaker #2		1 March 2025	College Station	
	16	49.96	Bol #7		11 February 2023	Metz	
	17	49.97	Kocembová #2		4 March 1984	Gothenburg	
	17	49.97	Butler #2		15 March 2025	Virginia Beach	
	19	49.98	Nazarova #2		18 February 2006	Moscow	
	20	50.00	Kratochvílová #4		10 February 1983	Vienna	
8	21	50.01	Sabine Busch	East Germany	2 February 1984	Vienna	
9	22	50.02	Nicola Sanders	Great Britain	3 March 2007	Birmingham	
10	23	50.04	Olesya Krasnomovets	Russia	18 February 2006	Moscow	
	24	50.04	Krasnomovets #2		12 March 2006	Moscow	
	25	50.07	Kratochvílová #5		22 February 1981	Grenoble	
11		50.10	Lieke Klaver	Netherlands	18 February 2024	Apeldoorn	
12		50.15	Olga Zaytseva	Russia	25 January 2006	Moscow	
12		50.15	Talitha Diggs	United States	25 February 2023	Fayetteville	
14		50.21	Vania Stambolova	Bulgaria	12 March 2006	Moscow	
14		50.21	Shaunae Miller-Uibo	Bahamas	13 February 2021	New York City	
16		50.23	Irina Privalova	Russia	12 March 1995	Barcelona	
17		50.24	Alexis Holmes	United States	2 March 2024	Glasgow	
18		50.28	Petra Müller	East Germany	6 March 1988	Budapest	
18		50.28	Ella Onojuvwevwo	Nigeria	13 March 2026	Fayetteville	
20		50.33	Rhasidat Adeleke	Ireland	25 February 2023	Lubbock	
21		50.34	Christine Amertil	Bahamas	12 March 2006	Moscow	
21		50.34	Kendall Ellis	United States	10 March 2018	College Station	
23		50.36	Sydney McLaughlin	United States	10 March 2018	College Station	
24		50.37	Natalya Antyukh	Russia	18 February 2006	Moscow	
25		50.40	Dagmar Neubauer	East Germany	2 February 1984	Vienna	

== Fastest relay splits ==
=== Men ===
Split ^{A}	Athlete	Leg	Date	Event	Place	Ref.
42.66	Lythe Pillay (RSA)	L2	3 May 2026	World Athletics Relays	Gaborone	
42.94 ^{B}	Michael Johnson (USA)	L4	22 August 1993	World Championships	Stuttgart	
42.99	Jonathan Simms (USA)	L4	12 June 2026	NCAA Division I Championships	Eugene	
43.04	Letsile Tebogo (BOT)	L4	10 August 2024	Summer Olympics	Saint-Denis	
43.06	Michael Norman (USA)	L4	27 May 2018	NCAA West Prelims	Sacramento	
43.09	Matthew Hudson-Smith (GBR)	L4	10 August 2024	Summer Olympics	Saint-Denis	
43.10	Jeremy Wariner (USA)	L4	2 September 2007	World Championships	Osaka	
43.1	Quincy Watts (USA)	L2	8 August 1992	Summer Olympics	Barcelona	
43.18	Jeremy Wariner (USA)	L4	23 August 2008	Summer Olympics	Beijing	
43.18	James Benson II (USA)	L4	7 June 2024	NCAA Championships	Eugene	
43.18	Rai Benjamin (USA)	L4	10 August 2024	Summer Olympics	Saint-Denis	
43.20	Auhmad Robinson (USA)	L4	7 June 2024	NCAA Championships	Eugene	
43.2	Ronald Freeman (USA)	L2	20 October 1968	Summer Olympics	Mexico City	
43.2	Jeremy Wariner (USA)	L2	8 April 2006	Texas Relays	Austin	
43.2	Tony McQuay (USA)	L2	20 August 2016	Summer Olympics	Rio de Janeiro	
43.23	Butch Reynolds (USA)	L3	22 August 1993	World Championships	Stuttgart	
43.24	Jonathan Jones (BAR)	L4	10 June 2022	NCAA Championships	Eugene	
43.26	Vernon Norwood (USA)	L2	10 August 2024	Summer Olympics	Saint-Denis	
43.26	Wayde Van Niekerk (SAF)	L3	21 September 2025	World Championships	Tokyo	
43.3	Demetrius Pinder (BAH)	L2	10 August 2012	Summer Olympics	London	

Annulled marks

- The American athlete Antonio Pettigrew recorded a split time of 43.1 at the 1997 World Championships men's 4 x 400 m finals in Athens, but his time was annulled in 2008, after Pettigrew admitted to multiple doping violations between 1997 and 2003.

=== Women ===
Split ^{A}	Athlete	Leg	Date	Event	Place	Ref.
47.6	Jarmila Kratochvílová (TCH)	L4	11 September 1982	European Championships	Athens	
47.70	Marita Koch (GDR)	L4	3 June 1984	National Championships	Erfurt	
47.71	Sydney McLaughlin-Levrone (USA)	L2	10 August 2024	Summer Olympics	Saint-Denis	
47.72	Allyson Felix (USA)	L3	30 August 2015	World Championships	Beijing	
47.75	Jarmila Kratochvílová (TCH)	L4	14 August 1983	World Championships	Helsinki	
47.8	Olga Bryzgina (URS)	L4	1 October 1988	Summer Olympics	Seoul	
47.82	Olga Nazarova (URS)	L2	1 October 1988	Summer Olympics	Seoul	
47.82	Sydney McLaughlin-Levrone (USA)	L4	21 September 2025	World Championships	Tokyo	
47.84	Taťána Kocembová (TCH)	L4	18 August 1984	Friendship Games	Prague	
47.9	Jarmila Kratochvílová (TCH)	L4	5 July 1981	European Cup Semifinal	Frankfurt	
47.9	Jarmila Kratochvílová (TCH)	L4	2 August 1981	European Cup B Final	Pescara	
47.9	Marita Koch (GDR)	L4	11 September 1982	European Championships	Athens	
47.9	Jarmila Kratochvílová (TCH)	L4	21 August 1983	European Cup Final	London	
47.9	Marita Koch (GDR)	L4	4 October 1985	IAAF World Cup	Canberra	
47.91	Sydney McLaughlin-Levrone (USA)	L4	24 July 2022	World Championships	Eugene	
48.00	Femke Bol (NED)	L4 ^{C}	3 August 2024	Summer Olympics	Saint-Denis	
48.01	Allyson Felix (USA)	L2	2 September 2007	World Championships	Osaka	
48.08	Florence Griffith Joyner (USA)	L4	1 October 1988	Summer Olympics	Seoul	
48.1	Alicia Brown (CAN)	L3	12 May 2019	IAAF World Relays	Yokohama	

- ^{^A} Relay splits are typically faster because athletes have a running start and do not need to react to the gun if they are not the leadoff leg.
- ^{^B} World Athletics reports a split time of 42.94, which is based on "photo-finish pictures taken at the start and finish of Johnson's leg supplied by Seiko. Using different methods, the DLV Biomechanics Report from Stuttgart 1993 variously showed timings of 42.91 and 42.92.
- ^{^C} Run in a mixed 4 x 400 metres relay race.

== Most successful athletes ==
3 or more 400-metre victories at the Olympic Games and World Championships:

- 6 wins: Michael Johnson (USA) - Olympic champion in 1996 and 2000, world champion in 1993, 1995, 1997 and 1999.
- 4 wins: Marie-Jose Perec (FRA) - Olympic champion in 1992 and 1996, world champion in 1991 and 1995.
- 3 wins: Cathy Freeman (AUS) - Olympic champion in 2000, world champion in 1997 and 1999.
- 3 wins: Jeremy Wariner (USA) - Olympic champion in 2004, world champion in 2005 and 2007.
- 3 wins: Christine Ohuruogu (GBR) - Olympic champion in 2008, world champion in 2007 and 2013.
- 3 wins: LaShawn Merritt (USA) - Olympic champion in 2008, world champion in 2009 and 2013.
- 3 wins: Wayde van Niekerk (RSA) - Olympic champion in 2016, world champion in 2015 and 2017.
- 3 wins: Shaunae Miller-Uibo (BAH) - Olympic champion in 2016 and 2020, world champion in 2022.

The Olympic champion has frequently won a second gold medal in the 4 × 400 metres relay. This has been accomplished 14 times by men; Charles Reidpath, Ray Barbuti, Bill Carr, George Rhoden, Charles Jenkins, Otis Davis, Mike Larrabee, Lee Evans, Viktor Markin, Alonzo Babers, Steve Lewis, Quincy Watts, Jeremy Wariner and LaShawn Merritt; and 4 times by women; Monika Zehrt, Valerie Brisco-Hooks, Olga Bryzgina and Sanya Richards-Ross. All but Rhoden, Markin, Zehrt and Bryzgina ran on American relay teams. Injured after his double in 1996, Johnson also accomplished the feat in 2000 only to have it disqualified when his teammate Antonio Pettigrew admitted to doping.

== Olympic medalists ==
=== Men ===
Games	Gold	Silver	Bronze
1896 Athens	Thomas Burke; United States	Herbert Jamison; United States	Charles Gmelin; Great Britain
1900 Paris	Maxie Long; United States	William Holland; United States	Ernst Schultz; Denmark
1904 St. Louis	Harry Hillman; United States	Frank Waller; United States	Herman Groman; United States
1908 London	Wyndham Halswelle; Great Britain	None awarded	None awarded
1912 Stockholm	Charles Reidpath; United States	Hanns Braun; Germany	Edward Lindberg; United States
1920 Antwerp	Bevil Rudd; South Africa	Guy Butler; Great Britain	Nils Engdahl; Sweden
1924 Paris	Eric Liddell; Great Britain	Horatio Fitch; United States	Guy Butler; Great Britain
1928 Amsterdam	Ray Barbuti; United States	James Ball; Canada	Joachim Büchner; Germany
1932 Los Angeles	Bill Carr; United States	Ben Eastman; United States	Alex Wilson; Canada
1936 Berlin	Archie Williams; United States	Godfrey Brown; Great Britain	James LuValle; United States
1948 London	Arthur Wint; Jamaica	Herb McKenley; Jamaica	Mal Whitfield; United States
1952 Helsinki	George Rhoden; Jamaica	Herb McKenley; Jamaica	Ollie Matson; United States
1956 Melbourne	Charles Jenkins; United States	Karl-Friedrich Haas; United Team of Germany	Voitto Hellsten; Finland
1956 Melbourne	Charles Jenkins; United States	Karl-Friedrich Haas; United Team of Germany	Ardalion Ignatyev; Soviet Union
1960 Rome	Otis Davis; United States	Carl Kaufmann; United Team of Germany	Malcolm Spence; South Africa
1964 Tokyo	Mike Larrabee; United States	Wendell Mottley; Trinidad and Tobago	Andrzej Badeński; Poland
1968 Mexico City	Lee Evans; United States	Larry James; United States	Ron Freeman; United States
1972 Munich	Vincent Matthews; United States	Wayne Collett; United States	Julius Sang; Kenya
1976 Montreal	Alberto Juantorena; Cuba	Fred Newhouse; United States	Herman Frazier; United States
1980 Moscow	Viktor Markin; Soviet Union	Rick Mitchell; Australia	Frank Schaffer; East Germany
1984 Los Angeles	Alonzo Babers; United States	Gabriel Tiacoh; Ivory Coast	Antonio McKay; United States
1988 Seoul	Steve Lewis; United States	Butch Reynolds; United States	Danny Everett; United States
1992 Barcelona	Quincy Watts; United States	Steve Lewis; United States	Samson Kitur; Kenya
1996 Atlanta	Michael Johnson; United States	Roger Black; Great Britain	Davis Kamoga; Uganda
2000 Sydney	Michael Johnson; United States	Alvin Harrison; United States	Greg Haughton; Jamaica
2004 Athens	Jeremy Wariner; United States	Otis Harris; United States	Derrick Brew; United States
2008 Beijing	LaShawn Merritt; United States	Jeremy Wariner; United States	David Neville; United States
2012 London	Kirani James; Grenada	Luguelín Santos; Dominican Republic	Lalonde Gordon; Trinidad and Tobago
2016 Rio de Janeiro	Wayde van Niekerk; South Africa	Kirani James; Grenada	LaShawn Merritt; United States
2020 Tokyo	Steven Gardiner; Bahamas	Anthony Zambrano; Colombia	Kirani James; Grenada
2024 Paris	Quincy Hall; United States	Matthew Hudson Smith; Great Britain	Muzala Samukonga; Zambia
2028 Los Angeles			

=== Women ===
Games	Gold	Silver	Bronze
1964 Tokyo	Betty Cuthbert; Australia	Ann Packer; Great Britain	Judy Amoore; Australia
1968 Mexico City	Colette Besson; France	Lillian Board; Great Britain	Natalya Pechonkina; Soviet Union
1972 Munich	Monika Zehrt; East Germany	Rita Wilden; West Germany	Kathy Hammond; United States
1976 Montreal	Irena Szewińska; Poland	Christina Brehmer; East Germany	Ellen Streidt; East Germany
1980 Moscow	Marita Koch; East Germany	Jarmila Kratochvílová; Czechoslovakia	Christina Lathan; East Germany
1984 Los Angeles	Valerie Brisco-Hooks; United States	Chandra Cheeseborough; United States	Kathy Smallwood-Cook; Great Britain
1988 Seoul	Olga Bryzgina; Soviet Union	Petra Müller; East Germany	Olga Nazarova; Soviet Union
1992 Barcelona	Marie-José Pérec; France	Olga Bryzgina; Unified Team	Ximena Restrepo; Colombia
1996 Atlanta	Marie-José Pérec; France	Cathy Freeman; Australia	Falilat Ogunkoya; Nigeria
2000 Sydney	Cathy Freeman; Australia	Lorraine Graham; Jamaica	Katharine Merry; Great Britain
2004 Athens	Tonique Williams-Darling; Bahamas	Ana Guevara; Mexico	Natalya Antyukh; Russia
2008 Beijing	Christine Ohuruogu; Great Britain	Shericka Williams; Jamaica	Sanya Richards; United States
2012 London	Sanya Richards-Ross; United States	Christine Ohuruogu; Great Britain	DeeDee Trotter; United States
2016 Rio de Janeiro	Shaunae Miller; Bahamas	Allyson Felix; United States	Shericka Jackson; Jamaica
2020 Tokyo	Shaunae Miller-Uibo; Bahamas	Marileidy Paulino; Dominican Republic	Allyson Felix; United States
2024 Paris	Marileidy Paulino; Dominican Republic	Salwa Eid Naser; Bahrain	Natalia Kaczmarek; Poland
2028 Los Angeles			

== World Championships medalists ==
=== Men ===
Championships	Gold	Silver	Bronze
1983 Helsinki	Bert Cameron (JAM)	Michael Franks (USA)	Sunder Nix (USA)
1987 Rome	Thomas Schönlebe (GDR)	Innocent Egbunike (NGA)	Harry Reynolds (USA)
1991 Tokyo	Antonio Pettigrew (USA)	Roger Black (GBR)	Danny Everett (USA)
1993 Stuttgart	Michael Johnson (USA)	Butch Reynolds (USA)	Samson Kitur (KEN)
1995 Gothenburg	Michael Johnson (USA)	Butch Reynolds (USA)	Greg Haughton (JAM)
1997 Athens	Michael Johnson (USA)	Davis Kamoga (UGA)	Tyree Washington (USA)
1999 Seville	Michael Johnson (USA)	Sanderlei Parrela (BRA)	Alejandro Cárdenas (MEX)
2001 Edmonton	Avard Moncur (BAH)	Ingo Schultz (GER)	Greg Haughton (JAM)
2003 Saint-Denis	Tyree Washington (USA)	Marc Raquil (FRA)	Michael Blackwood (JAM)
2005 Helsinki	Jeremy Wariner (USA)	Andrew Rock (USA)	Tyler Christopher (CAN)
2007 Osaka	Jeremy Wariner (USA)	LaShawn Merritt (USA)	Angelo Taylor (USA)
2009 Berlin	LaShawn Merritt (USA)	Jeremy Wariner (USA)	Renny Quow (TRI)
2011 Daegu	Kirani James (GRN)	LaShawn Merritt (USA)	Kévin Borlée (BEL)
2013 Moscow	LaShawn Merritt (USA)	Tony McQuay (USA)	Luguelín Santos (DOM)
2015 Beijing	Wayde van Niekerk (RSA)	LaShawn Merritt (USA)	Kirani James (GRN)
2017 London	Wayde van Niekerk (RSA)	Steven Gardiner (BAH)	Abdalelah Haroun (QAT)
2019 Doha	Steven Gardiner (BAH)	Anthony Zambrano (COL)	Fred Kerley (USA)
2022 Eugene	Michael Norman (USA)	Kirani James (GRN)	Matthew Hudson-Smith (GBR)
2023 Budapest	Antonio Watson (JAM)	Matthew Hudson-Smith (GBR)	Quincy Hall (USA)
2025 Tokyo	Collen Kebinatshipi (BOT)	Jereem Richards (TTO)	Bayapo Ndori (BOT)

==== Medalists by country ====
Rank	Nation	Gold	Silver	Bronze	Total
1	United States (USA)	11	9	6	27
2	Bahamas (BAH)	2	1	0	3
3	Jamaica (JAM)	2	0	3	5
4	South Africa (RSA)	2	0	0	2
5	Grenada (GRN)	1	1	1	3
6	Botswana (BOT)	1	0	1	2
7	East Germany (GDR)	1	0	0	1
8	Great Britain (GBR)	0	2	1	3
9	Trinidad and Tobago (TRI)	0	1	1	2
10	Brazil (BRA)	0	1	0	1
10	Colombia (COL)	0	1	0	1
10	France (FRA)	0	1	0	1
10	Germany (GER)	0	1	0	1
10	Nigeria (NGR)	0	1	0	1
10	Uganda (UGA)	0	1	0	1
16	Belgium (BEL)	0	0	1	1
16	Canada (CAN)	0	0	1	1
16	Dominican Republic (DOM)	0	0	1	1
16	Kenya (KEN)	0	0	1	1
16	Mexico (MEX)	0	0	1	1
16	Qatar (QAT)	0	0	1	1

=== Women ===
Championships	Gold	Silver	Bronze
1983 Helsinki	Jarmila Kratochvílová (TCH)	Taťána Kocembová (TCH)	Mariya Pinigina (URS)
1987 Rome	Olga Bryzgina (URS)	Petra Muller (GDR)	Kirsten Emmelmann (GDR)
1991 Tokyo	Marie-José Pérec (FRA)	Grit Breuer (GER)	Sandra Myers (ESP)
1993 Stuttgart	Jearl Miles (USA)	Natasha Kaiser-Brown (USA)	Sandie Richards (JAM)
1995 Gothenburg	Marie-José Pérec (FRA)	Pauline Davis (BAH)	Jearl Miles (USA)
1997 Athens	Cathy Freeman (AUS)	Sandie Richards (JAM)	Jearl Miles Clark (USA)
1999 Seville	Cathy Freeman (AUS)	Anja Rücker (GER)	Lorraine Graham-Fenton (JAM)
2001 Edmonton	Amy Mbacké Thiam (SEN)	Lorraine Fenton (JAM)	Ana Guevara (MEX)
2003 Saint-Denis	Ana Guevara (MEX)	Lorraine Fenton (JAM)	Amy Mbacké Thiam (SEN)
2005 Helsinki	Tonique Williams-Darling (BAH)	Sanya Richards (USA)	Ana Guevara (MEX)
2007 Osaka	Christine Ohuruogu (GBR)	Nicola Sanders (GBR)	Novlene Williams (JAM)
2009 Berlin	Sanya Richards (USA)	Shericka Williams (JAM)	Antonina Krivoshapka (RUS)
2011 Daegu	Amantle Montsho (BOT)	Allyson Felix (USA)	Francena McCorory (USA)§
2013 Moscow	Christine Ohuruogu (GBR)	Amantle Montsho (BOT)	Stephanie McPherson (JAM)^{§}
2015 Beijing	Allyson Felix (USA)	Shaunae Miller (BAH)	Shericka Jackson (JAM)
2017 London	Phyllis Francis (USA)	Salwa Eid Naser (BHR)	Allyson Felix (USA)
2019 Doha	Salwa Eid Naser (BHR)	Shaunae Miller-Uibo (BAH)	Shericka Jackson (JAM)
2022 Eugene	Shaunae Miller-Uibo (BAH)	Marileidy Paulino (DOM)	Sada Williams (BAR)
2023 Budapest	Marileidy Paulino (DOM)	Natalia Kaczmarek (POL)	Sada Williams (BAR)
2025 Tokyo	Sydney McLaughlin-Levrone (USA)	Marileidy Paulino (DOM)	Salwa Eid Naser (BHR)

§ : awarded following doping disqualification.

==== Medalists by country ====
Rank	Nation	Gold	Silver	Bronze	Total
1	United States (USA)	5	3	4	12
2	Bahamas (BAH)	2	3	0	5
3	Great Britain (GBR)	2	1	0	3
5	Australia (AUS)	2	0	0	2
5	France (FRA)	2	0	0	2
6	Dominican Republic (DOM)	1	2	0	3
7	Bahrain (BHR)	1	1	1	3
8	Botswana (BOT)	1	1	0	2
8	Czechoslovakia (TCH)	1	1	0	2
10	Mexico (MEX)	1	0	2	3
11	Senegal (SEN)	1	0	1	2
11	Soviet Union (URS)	1	0	1	2
13	Jamaica (JAM)	0	4	6	10
14	Germany (GER)	0	2	0	2
15	East Germany (GDR)	0	1	1	2
16	Poland (POL)	0	1	0	1
17	Barbados (BAR)	0	0	2	2
17	Russia (RUS)	0	0	2	2
13	Spain (ESP)	0	0	1	1

== World Indoor Championships medalists ==
=== Men ===
Games	Gold	Silver	Bronze
1985 Paris^{[A]}	Thomas Schönlebe (GDR)	Todd Bennett (GBR)	Mark Rowe (USA)
1987 Indianapolis	Antonio McKay (USA)	Roberto Hernández (CUB)	Michael Franks (USA)
1989 Budapest	Antonio McKay (USA)	Ian Morris (TTO)	Cayetano Cornet (ESP)
1991 Seville	Devon Morris (JAM)	Samson Kitur (KEN)	Cayetano Cornet (ESP)
1993 Toronto	Butch Reynolds (USA)	Sunday Bada (NGR)	Darren Clark (AUS)
1995 Barcelona	Darnell Hall (USA)	Sunday Bada (NGR)	Mikhail Vdovin (RUS)
1997 Paris	Sunday Bada (NGR)	Jamie Baulch (GBR)	Shunji Karube (JPN)
1999 Maebashi	Jamie Baulch (GBR)	Milton Campbell (USA)	Alejandro Cárdenas (MEX)
2001 Lisbon	Daniel Caines (GBR)	Milton Campbell (USA)	Danny McFarlane (JAM)
2003 Birmingham	Tyree Washington (USA)	Daniel Caines (GBR)	Paul McKee (IRL) Jamie Baulch (GBR)
2004 Budapest	Alleyne Francique (GRN)	Davian Clarke (JAM)	Gary Kikaya (COD)
2006 Moscow	Alleyne Francique (GRN)	California Molefe (BOT)	Chris Brown (BAH)
2008 Valencia	Tyler Christopher (CAN)	Johan Wissman (SWE)	Chris Brown (BAH)
2010 Doha	Chris Brown (BAH)	William Collazo (CUB)	Jamaal Torrance (USA)
2012 Istanbul	Nery Brenes (CRC)	Demetrius Pinder (BAH)	Chris Brown (BAH)
2014 Sopot	Pavel Maslák (CZE)	Chris Brown (BAH)	Kyle Clemons (USA)
2016 Portland	Pavel Maslák (CZE)	Abdalelah Haroun (QAT)	Deon Lendore (TTO)
2018 Birmingham	Pavel Maslák (CZE)	Michael Cherry (USA)	Deon Lendore (TTO)
2022 Belgrade	Jereem Richards (TTO)	Trevor Bassitt (USA)	Carl Bengtström (SWE)
2024 Glasgow	Alexander Doom (BEL)	Karsten Warholm (NOR)	Rusheen McDonald (JAM)
2025 Nanjing	Christopher Bailey (USA)	Brian Faust (USA)	Jacory Patterson (USA)
2026 Toruń	Christopher Morales Williams (CAN)	Khaleb McRae (USA)	Jereem Richards (TTO)

=== Women ===
Games	Gold	Silver	Bronze
1985 Paris^{[A]}	Diane Dixon (USA)	Regine Berg (BEL)	Charmaine Crooks (CAN)
1987 Indianapolis	Sabine Busch (GDR)	Lillie Leatherwood (USA)	Judit Forgács (HUN)
1989 Budapest	Helga Arendt (FRG)	Diane Dixon (USA)	Jillian Richardson (TTO)
1991 Seville	Diane Dixon (USA)	Sandra Myers (ESP)	Anita Protti (SUI)
1993 Toronto	Sandie Richards (JAM)	Tatyana Alekseyeva (RUS)	Jearl Miles Clark (USA)
1995 Barcelona	Irina Privalova (RUS)	Sandie Richards (JAM)	Daniela Georgieva (BUL)
1997 Paris	Jearl Miles Clark (USA)	Sandie Richards (JAM)	Helena Fuchsová (CZE)
1999 Maebashi	Grit Breuer (GER)	Falilat Ogunkoya (NGR)	Jearl Miles Clark (USA)
2001 Lisbon	Sandie Richards (JAM)	Olga Kotlyarova (RUS)	Olesya Zykina (RUS)
2003 Birmingham	Natalya Nazarova (RUS)	Christine Amertil (BAH)	Grit Breuer (GER)
2004 Budapest	Natalya Nazarova (RUS)	Olesya Forsheva (RUS)	Tonique Williams-Darling (BAH)
2006 Moscow	Olesya Forsheva (RUS)	Vania Stambolova (BUL)	Christine Amertil (BAH)
2008 Valencia	Olesya Zykina (RUS)	Natalya Nazarova (RUS)	Shareese Woods (USA)
2010 Doha	Debbie Dunn (USA)	Vania Stambolova (BUL)	Amantle Montsho (BOT)
2012 Istanbul	Sanya Richards-Ross (USA)	Aleksandra Fedoriva (RUS)	Natasha Hastings (USA)
2014 Sopot	Francena McCorory (USA)	Kaliese Spencer (JAM)	Shaunae Miller (BAH)
2016 Portland	Kemi Adekoya (BHR)	Ashley Spencer (USA)	Quanera Hayes (USA)
2018 Birmingham	Courtney Okolo (USA)	Shakima Wimbley (USA)	Eilidh Doyle (GBR)
2022 Belgrade	Shaunae Miller-Uibo (BAH)	Femke Bol (NED)	Stephenie Ann McPherson (JAM)
2024 Glasgow	Femke Bol (NED)	Lieke Klaver (NED)	Alexis Holmes (USA)
2025 Nanjing	Amber Anning (GBR)	Alexis Holmes (USA)	Henriette Jæger (NOR)
2026 Toruń	Lurdes Gloria Manuel (CZE)	Natalia Bukowiecka (POL)	Lieke Klaver (NED)

- ^{^{A}} Known as the World Indoor Games

== World leading times ==
=== Men ===
Year	Time	Athlete	Place
1966	44.82 y	Wendell Mottley (TTO)	Kingston
1967	44.74 + h	Tommie Smith (USA)	San Jose
1968	43.86 A	Lee Evans (USA)	Mexico City
1969	44.67 y	Curtis Mills (USA)	Knoxville
1970	45.01	Charles Asati (KEN)	Edinburgh
1971	44.44 y h	John Smith (USA)	Eugene
1972	44.34 h	Wayne Collett (USA)	Eugene
1973	44.85 y	Maurice Peoples (USA)	Baton Rouge
1974	44.94 h A	Alberto Juantorena (CUB)	Mexico City
1975	44.45 A	Ronnie Ray (USA)	Mexico City
1976	44.26	Alberto Juantorena (CUB)	Montreal
1977	44.65	Alberto Juantorena (CUB)	La Habana
1978	44.27 A	Alberto Juantorena (CUB)	Medellín
1979	44.92	Harald Schmid (FRG)	Stuttgart
1980	44.60	Viktor Markin (URS)	Moscow
1981	44.58	Bert Cameron (JAM)	Baton Rouge
1982	44.68	Sunder Nix (USA)	Indianapolis
1983	44.50	Erwin Skamrahl (FRG)	Munich
1984	44.27	Alonzo Babers (USA)	Los Angeles
1985	44.47	Michael Franks (USA)	Canberra
1986	44.30	Gabriel Tiacoh (CIV)	Indianapolis
1987	44.10	Butch Reynolds (USA)	Columbus
1988	43.29	Butch Reynolds (USA)	Zurich
1989	44.27	Antonio Pettigrew (USA)	Houston
1990	44.06	Danny Everett (USA)	Seville
1991	44.17	Michael Johnson (USA)	Lausanne
1992	43.50	Quincy Watts (USA)	Barcelona
1993	43.65	Michael Johnson (USA)	Stuttgart
1994	43.90	Michael Johnson (USA)	Madrid
1995	43.39	Michael Johnson (USA)	Gothenburg
1996	43.44	Michael Johnson (USA)	Atlanta
1997	43.75	Michael Johnson (USA)	Waco
1998	43.68	Michael Johnson (USA)	Zürich
1999	43.18	Michael Johnson (USA)	Sevilla
2000	43.68	Michael Johnson (USA)	Sacramento
2001	44.28	Tyree Washington (USA)	Los Angeles
2002	44.45	Leonard Byrd (USA)	Belém
2003	44.33	Tyree Washington (USA)	Palo Alto
2004	44.00	Jeremy Wariner (USA)	Athens
2005	43.93	Jeremy Wariner (USA)	Helsinki
2006	43.62	Jeremy Wariner (USA)	Rome
2007	43.45	Jeremy Wariner (USA)	Osaka
2008	43.75	LaShawn Merritt (USA)	Beijing
2009	44.06	LaShawn Merritt (USA)	Berlin
2010	44.13	Jeremy Wariner (USA)	Zürich
2011	44.35	LaShawn Merritt (USA)	Daegu
2012	43.94	Kirani James (GRN)	London
2013	43.74	LaShawn Merritt (USA)	Moscow
2014	43.74	Kirani James (GRN)	Lausanne
2015	43.48	Wayde van Niekerk (RSA)	Beijing
2016	43.03	Wayde van Niekerk (RSA)	Rio de Janeiro
2017	43.62	Wayde van Niekerk (RSA)	Lausanne
2018	43.61	Michael Norman (USA)	Eugene
2019	43.45	Michael Norman (USA)	Torrance
2020	44.91	Justin Robinson (USA)	Marietta
2021	43.85	Randolph Ross (USA)	Eugene
2021	43.85	Steven Gardiner (BAH)	Tokyo
2022	43.56	Michael Norman (USA)	Eugene
2023	43.74	Steven Gardiner (BAH)	Székesfehérvár
2024	43.40	Quincy Hall (USA)	Saint-Denis
2025	43.53	Collen Kebinatshipi (BOT)	Tokyo
2026	43.38	Samuel Ogazi (NGR)	Eugene

=== Women ===
Year	Time	Athlete	Place
1966	—	—	—
1967	—	—	—
1968	52.03 A	Colette Besson (FRA)	Mexico City
1969	51.72	Nicole Duclos (FRA)	Athens
1970	51.02	Marilyn Neufville (JAM)	Edinburgh
1971	52.14	Helga Seidler (GDR)	Helsinki
1972	51.08	Monika Zehrt (GDR)	Munich
1973	51.27	Mona-Lisa Pursiainen (FIN)	Helsinki
1974	50.14	Riitta Salin (FIN)	Rome
1975	50.50	Irena Szewinska (POL)	Nice
1976	49.28	Irena Szewinska (POL)	Montreal
1977	49.52	Irena Szewinska (POL)	Düsseldorf
1978	48.94	Marita Koch (GDR)	Prague
1979	48.60	Marita Koch (GDR)	Potsdam
1980	48.88	Marita Koch (GDR)	Moscow
1981	48.61	Jarmila Kratochvílová (CZE)	Rome
1982	48.16	Marita Koch (GDR)	Athens
1983	47.99	Jarmila Kratochvílová (CZE)	Helsinki
1984	48.16	Marita Koch (GDR)	Prague
1985	47.60	Marita Koch (GDR)	Canberra
1986	48.22	Marita Koch (GDR)	Stuttgart
1987	49.38	Olga Bryzgina (URS)	Rome
1988	48.65	Olga Bryzgina (URS)	Seoul
1989	50.01	Ana Fidelia Quirot (CUB)	Duisburg
1990	49.50	Grit Breuer (GER)	Split
1991	49.32	Marie-José Pérec (FRA)	Frankfurt
1992	48.83	Marie-José Pérec (FRA)	Frankfurt
1993	49.81	Ma Yuqin (CHN)	Beijing
1994	49.77	Marie-José Pérec (FRA)	Paris
1995	49.28	Marie-José Pérec (FRA)	Gothenburg
1996	48.25	Marie-José Pérec (FRA)	Atlanta
1997	49.39	Cathy Freeman (AUS)	Oslo
1998	49.29	Charity Opara (NGR)	Rome
1999	49.62	Falilat Ogunkoya (NGR)	Lagos
2000	49.11	Cathy Freeman (AUS)	Sydney
2001	49.59	Katharine Merry (GBR)	Athens
2002	49.16	Ana Guevara (MEX)	Zürich
2003	48.89	Ana Guevara (MEX)	Saint-Denis
2004	49.07	Tonique Williams-Darling (BAH)	Berlin
2005	48.92	Sanya Richards-Ross (USA)	Zürich
2006	48.70	Sanya Richards-Ross (USA)	Athens
2007	49.27	Sanya Richards-Ross (USA)	Berlin
2007	49.27	Sanya Richards-Ross (USA)	Stuttgart
2008	49.62	Christine Ohuruogu (GBR)	Beijing
2009	48.83	Sanya Richards-Ross (USA)	Brussels
2010	49.64	Debbie Dunn (USA)	Des Moines
2011	49.35	Anastasiya Kapachinskaya (RUS)	Cheboksary
2012	49.16	Antonina Krivoshapka (RUS)	Cheboksary
2013	49.33	Amantle Montsho (BOT)	Monaco
2014	49.48	Francena McCorory (USA)	Sacramento
2015	49.26	Allyson Felix (USA)	Beijing
2016	49.44	Shaunae Miller (BAH)	Rio de Janeiro
2017	49.46	Shaunae Miller-Uibo (BAH)	Brussels
2018	48.97	Shaunae Miller-Uibo (BAH)	Monaco
2019	48.14	Salwa Eid Naser (BHR)	Doha
2020	50.42 A	Beatrice Masilingi (NAM)	Pretoria
2021	48.36	Shaunae Miller-Uibo (BAH)	Tokyo
2022	48.99	Marileidy Paulino (DOM)	Zürich
2023	48.74	Sydney McLaughlin-Levrone (USA)	Eugene
2024	48.17	Marileidy Paulino (DOM)	Saint-Denis
2025	47.78	Sydney McLaughlin-Levrone (USA)	Tokyo
2026	48.48	Marileidy Paulino (DOM)	Paris

== See also ==
- National records in the 400 metres
