= Ann-Louise Skoglund =

Swedish hurdler

Personal information
- Nickname: Lisa
- Born: 28 June 1962 (age 63) Karlstad, Sweden
Medal record
Women's athletics
Representing Sweden
European Championships
Gold medal – first place	1982 Athens	400 m hurdles

Eva Ann-Louise Skoglund (born 28 June 1962) is a retired track and field hurdler from Sweden. She is best known for winning the gold medal in the women's 400m hurdles at the 1982 European Championships, and she set the world best year performance in her event in 1982.

Sporting positions
Preceded by (East Germany) Ellen Fiedler	Women's 400m Hurdles Best Year Performance; 1982	Succeeded by (Soviet Union) Anna Ambrazienė
