= Olha Bryzghina =

Ukrainian sprinter

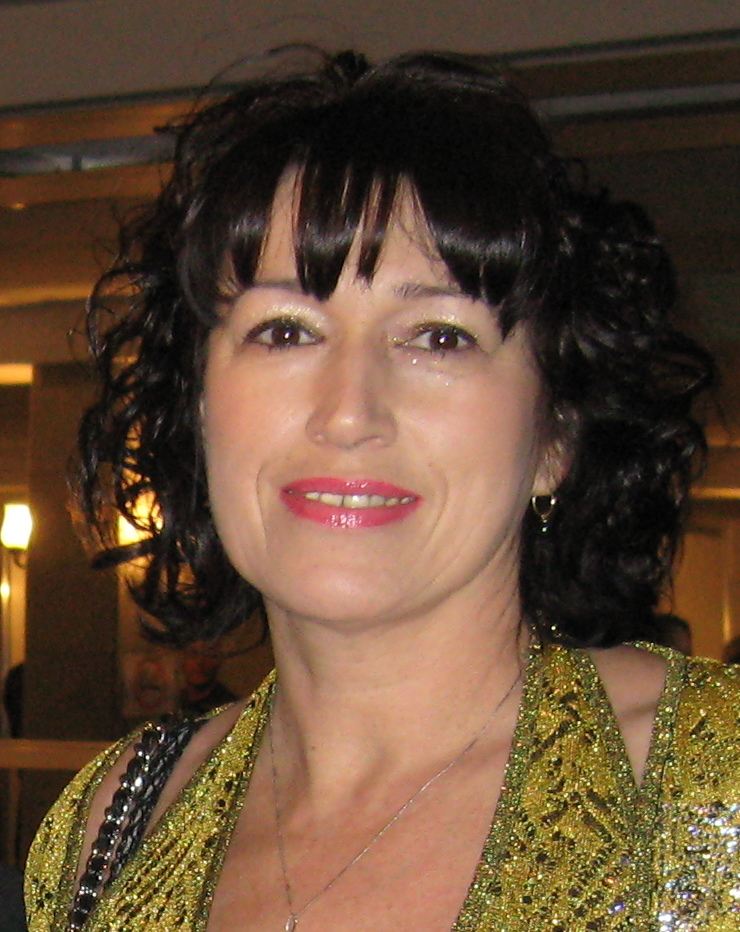
- Portrait of Olha Bryzhina

Personal information
- Born: June 30, 1963 (age 63)
- Height: 1.71 m (5 ft 7 1/2 in)
- Weight: 63 kg (139 lb)

Sport
- Country: Soviet Union; Ukraine
- Sport: Track and field
- Event: 4 × 400 m relay
Medal record
Olympic Games
Representing Soviet Union
Gold medal – first place	1988 Seoul	400 m
Gold medal – first place	1988 Seoul	4 × 400 m relay
Representing Unified Team
Gold medal – first place	1992 Barcelona	4 × 400 m relay
Silver medal – second place	1992 Barcelona	400 m
Representing Unified Team
European Indoor Championships
Silver medal – second place	1992 Genoa	400 m
IAAF Grand Prix Final
Gold medal – first place	1992 Turin	400 m
World Championships
Representing Soviet Union
Gold medal – first place	1987 Rome	400 m
Gold medal – first place	1991 Tokyo	4 × 400 m relay
Silver medal – second place	1987 Rome	4 × 400 m relay
Representing Soviet Union
European Championships
Silver medal – second place	1986 Stuttgart	400 m
Representing Soviet Union
IAAF World Cup
Silver medal – second place	1985 Canberra	400 m
Silver medal – second place	1985 Canberra	4 × 400 m relay
Representing Soviet Union
European Cup
Gold medal – first place	1985 Moscow	400 m
Gold medal – first place	1985 Moscow	4 × 400 m relay
Representing Soviet Union
Friendship Games
Gold medal – first place	1984 Moscow	4 × 400 m relay
Bronze medal – third place	1984 Moscow	400 m
Representing Soviet Union
Goodwill Games
Gold medal – first place	1986 Moscow	400 m
Silver medal – second place	1986 Moscow	4 × 400 m relay

Olha Bryzhina (Ukrainian: Ольга Бризгіна, née Olga Arkad'evna Vladykina; Russian: Ольга Аркадьевна Владыкина; born June 30, 1963, in Krasnokamsk, Perm Oblast) is a retired athlete who represented the Soviet Union (until 1991) and later Ukraine.

== Career ==
Bryzhina trained at Dynamo in Voroshilovgrad. Competing in the 400 metres and 4 × 400 metres relay, she was a particularly successful Olympian with three gold medals and one silver. At the 1988 Olympics the Soviet relay team set a new world record of 3:15.17 minutes which is still unbeaten (2025). Bryzhina also became world champion in 1987.

Bryzhina defeated Florence Griffith Joyner at the 1988 Seoul Olympics in the 4 × 400 m relay. Both runners ran the final leg of the relay and took the baton at about the same time. "Flo-Jo" ran a well paced race, chasing Bryzhina closely, and tried to challenge Bryzhina at the 300 m point. However, the challenge from Flo-Jo was unsuccessful and Bryzhina won by a 4m margin, taking gold for the Soviet Union along with a new world record for the USSR team. Bryzhina's time of 47.7 seconds in the 1988 Olympic relay is one of the fastest relay legs ever run by a woman in the history of track and field.

Bryzhina's 400 m personal best of 48.27 seconds makes her the 6th fastest performer of all time in a laned 400 m race. She achieved this in the same race that Marita Koch set the current 400 m world record of 47.60 seconds on 6 October 1985 at the Bruce Stadium in Canberra (Australia).

Bryzhina's husband Viktor Bryzhin was also a champion track athlete, winning gold in the 4 × 100 m relay event at the 1988 Olympics. Together they have two daughters, Yelizaveta Bryzhina and Anastasiia Bryzgina, who are also successful track runners (competing for Ukraine).

Bryzhina and her daughter Yelizaveta both had a best performance of 22.44 seconds over 200 m as of December 2012.

== Personal bests ==
- 200 metres - 22.44 (1985)
- 400 metres - 48.27 (1985)

== Achievements ==
Year	Competition	Venue	Position	Event	Notes
Representing Soviet Union
1984	Friendship Games	Prague, Czechoslovakia	3rd	400 m	49.52
1985	World Cup	Canberra, Australia	2nd	400 metres	48.27
1986	European Championships	Stuttgart, Germany	2nd	400 metres	49.67
1986	European Championships	Stuttgart, Germany	DSQ	4 × 400 m relay	
1987	World Championships	Rome, Italy	1st	400 metres	49.38
1987	World Championships	Rome, Italy	2nd	4 × 400 m relay	3:19.50
1988	Olympic Games	Seoul, South Korea	1st	400 metres	48.65
1988	Olympic Games	Seoul, South Korea	1st	4 × 400 m relay	3:15.17 WR
1991	World Championships	Tokyo, Japan	4th	400 metres	49.82
1991	World Championships	Tokyo, Japan	1st	4 × 400 m relay	3:18.47
Representing Unified Team
1992	European Indoor Championships	Genoa, Italy	2nd	400 m	51.48
1992	Olympic Games	Barcelona, Spain	2nd	400 metres	49.05
1992	Olympic Games	Barcelona, Spain	1st	4 × 400 m relay	3:20.20
