= Kirsten Emmelmann =

East German sprinter (born 1961)

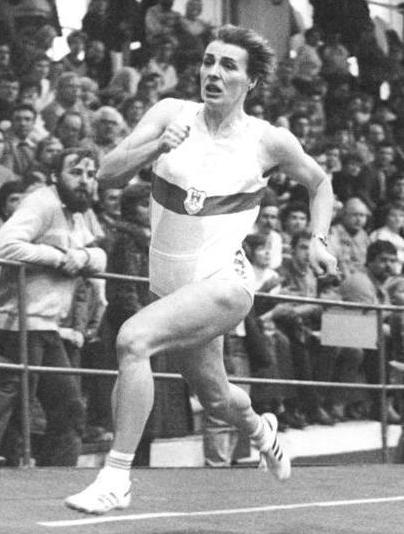

Medal record

Women's athletics

Representing East Germany

Olympic Games
Bronze medal – third place	1988 Seoul	4×400 m

World Championships
Gold medal – first place	1987 Rome	4×400 m
Bronze medal – third place	1987 Rome	400 m

European Championships
Gold medal – first place	1982 Athens	4×400 m

Kirsten Emmelmann (née Siemon; born 19 April 1961 in Warnemünde, Bezirk Rostock) is a German former track and field athlete who represented East Germany in the 1980s in the 400 meter sprint. Her biggest success came as a member of the 4 × 400 meter relay: in 1987 she was world champion, and at the 1988 Summer Olympics her team was third. Her biggest individual success came at the World athletics championship in 1987 when she was third.

== Results ==
- 1982, European Championship: 1st place with the 4 × 400 meter relay (under the name Kirsten Siemon; World record: 3:19.05 min, with Sabine Busch, Marita Koch und Dagmar Neubauer-Rübsam)
- 1986, European championship: 4th place in the 400 meter (50.43 s); 1st place with the 4 × 400 meter relay (3:16.87 min, with Sabine Busch, Petra Müller, Marita Koch)
- 1987, World championship: 3rd place in the 400 meter (50.20 s); 1st place in the 4 × 400 meter relay (3:18.63 min, with Sabine Busch, Dagmar Neubauer and Petra Müller)
- 1988, Olympic Games: 3rd place in the 4 × 400 meter relay (3:18.29 min, with Sabine Busch, Dagmar Neubauer and Petra Müller)

Emmelmann represented sport club Empor Rostock (trainer Wolfgang Meier) and after she got married she went to sport club Magdeburg (trainer Klaus Wübbenhorst). During her sporting career she was 1.73 meters tall and weighed 63 kilograms. She was married in 1984 to Frank Emmelmann, a 100-meter sprinter. After the end of her career she worked in a sporting goods store.
