= Dagmar Neubauer =

East German sprinter (born 1962)

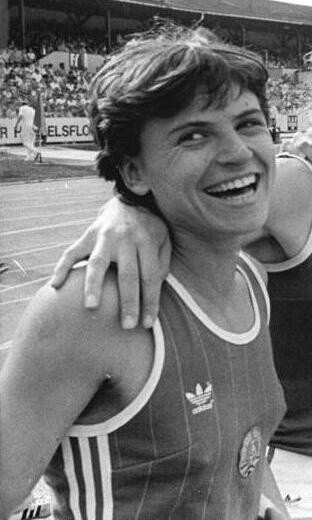
- Neubauer in 1984

Medal record

Women's athletics

Representing East Germany

Olympic Games
Bronze medal – third place	1988 Seoul	4×400 m

World Championships
Gold medal – first place	1983 Helsinki	4×400 m
Gold medal – first place	1987 Rome	4×400 m

European Championships
Gold medal – first place	1982 Athens	4×400 m

Dagmar Neubauer (née Rübsam; born 3 June 1962 in Suhl) is a retired German sprinter who specialized in the 400 metres.

At the 1982 European Championships she finished sixth in the 400 metres, but won a gold medal in the 4 × 400 metres relay together with teammates Kirsten Siemon, Sabine Busch and Marita Koch. At the 1983 World Championships she finished seventh in the individual event and won another gold medal in the relay, with teammates Kerstin Walther, Sabine Busch and Marita Koch. East Germany boycotted the 1984 Olympics.

At the 1987 World Championships Neubauer did not reach the final in the individual event, but instead won another gold medal in the relay, with teammates Emmelmann, Petra Schersing and Busch. At the 1988 Summer Olympics she won another relay medal, this time a bronze medal alongside her teammates Emmelmann, Busch and Schersing.

Neubauer twice broke the world record in the women's 4 × 400 m relay during the 1980s. In September 1982 she clocked 3:19.04 minutes alongside Emmelmann, Busch and Koch. Two years later, in June 1984 in Erfurt, her team ran in 3:15.92 minutes.

Her personal best time was 49.58 seconds, achieved in June 1984 in Erfurt. This places her sixth on the German all-time list, behind Marita Koch, Sabine Busch, Petra Müller, Grit Breuer and Bärbel Wöckel.

Neubauer represented the sports club SC Turbine Erfurt and was coached by Eberhard König.
