= Taťána Kocembová =

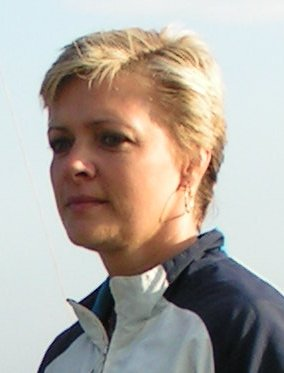

Personal information
- Full name: Taťána Netoličková-Kocembová
- Born: 2 May 1962 (age 64) Ostrava, Czechoslovakia

Sport
- Country: Czechoslovakia
- Sport: Athletics
- Event: 400 metres
Medal record
Women's athletics
Representing Czechoslovakia
World Championships
Silver medal – second place	1983 Helsinki	400 m
Silver medal – second place	1983 Helsinki	4×400 m
European Championships
Silver medal – second place	1982 Athens	4×400 m
Bronze medal – third place	1982 Athens	400 m

Taťána Netoličková (née Kocembová; Czech pronunciation: [ˈtacaːna ˈkotsembovaː], divorced Slaninová; born 2 May 1962) is a retired 400 metres runner who represented Czechoslovakia. Her greatest achievement was winning the silver medal behind teammate Jarmila Kratochvílová at the 1983 World Championships in a personal best time of 48.59s. A time that still ranks her eighth on the world all-time list. She won a second silver medal in the 4 × 400 metres relay. In 1984, she won the 400 m at the European Indoor Championships. She also held the world best for the unofficial distance of 500 metres.

== Personal life ==
Born in Ostrava, she is married to Jaroslav Netolička, with whom she has a son. She was previously married to her coach Jan Slanina. Their daughter, Jana Slaninová (born 1990) is also a sprinter, with a 400 m best of 53.74 secs (2013).

== International competitions ==
Year	Competition	Venue	Position	Event	Notes
1982	European Indoor Championships	Milan, Italy	4th	400 m	51.62
1982	European Championships	Athens, Greece	3rd	400 m	50.55
1982	European Championships	Athens, Greece	2nd	4 × 400 m relay	3:22.17
1983	World Championships	Helsinki, Finland	2nd	400 m	48.59 PB
1983	World Championships	Helsinki, Finland	2nd	4 × 400 m relay	3:20.32
1984	European Indoor Championships	Gothenburg, Sweden	1st	400 m	49.97
1984	Friendship Games	Moscow, Soviet Union	2nd	400 m	48.73
1984	Friendship Games	Moscow, Soviet Union	2nd	4 × 400 m relay	3:21.89
1986	European Indoor Championships	Madrid, Spain	4th	400 m	53.16
1986	European Championships	Stuttgart, Germany	6th	400 m	51.50
1989	European Indoor Championships	The Hague, Netherlands	5th	400 m	54.16
