= Marita Koch =

German sprint track and field athlete (born 1957)

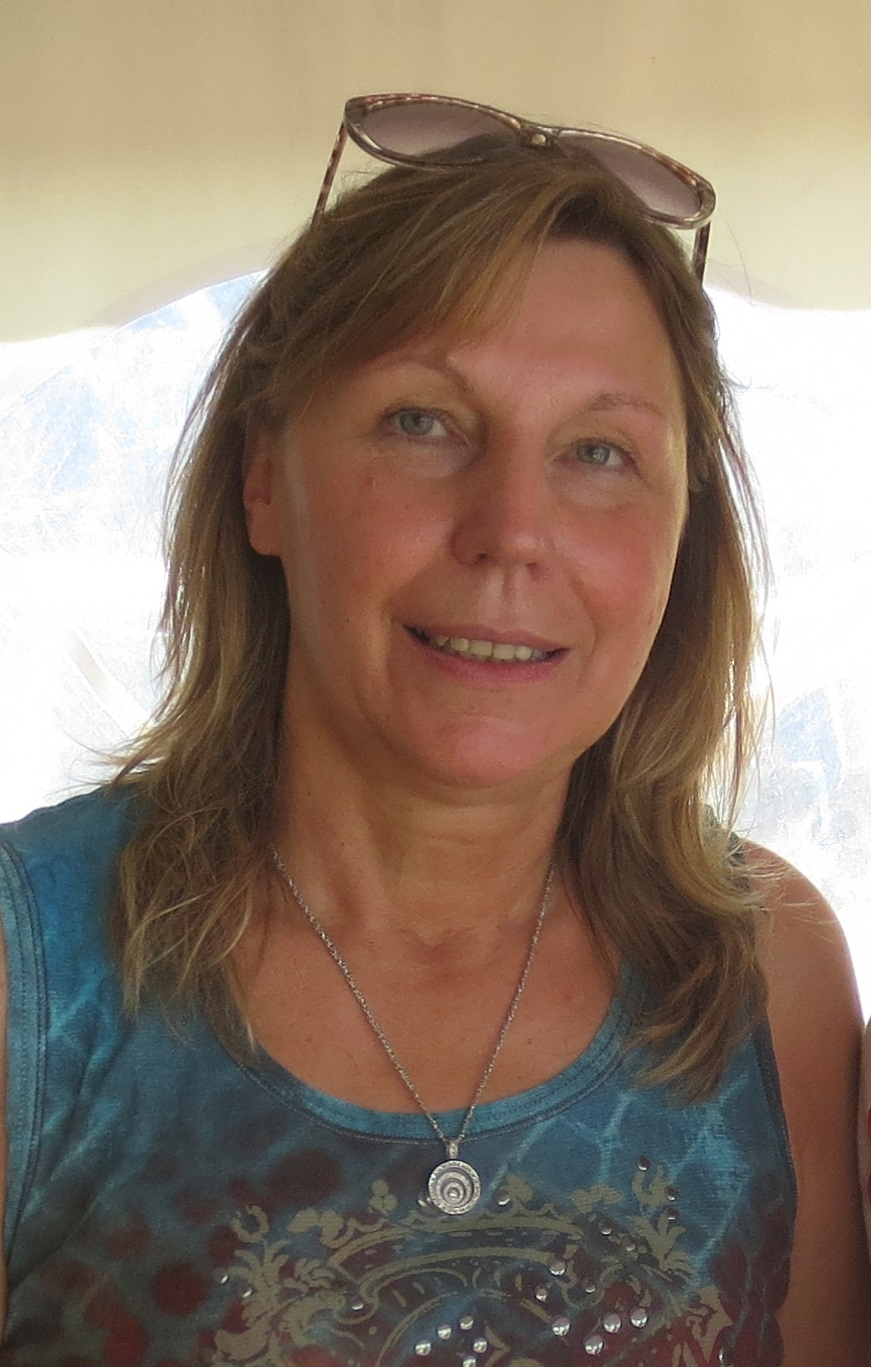
- Koch in 2013

Personal information
- Born: 18 February 1957 (age 69) Wismar, Bezirk Rostock, East Germany
- Height: 171 cm (5 ft 7 in)
- Weight: 62 kg (137 lb)

Sport
- Sport: Track and field

Achievements and titles
- Personal bests: 50 m: 6.11 s NR (Note: Former World Record) (Note: Annegret Richter and Renate Stecher both ran a hand timed 6.0); 60 m: 7.04 s NR (Note: Tied with Silke Möller) (Note: Marlies Göhr ran a hand timed 6.9); 100 m: 10.83 s; 200 m: 21.71 s NR; 300 m: 34.14 s WB; 400 m: 47.60 s WR
Medal record
Women's athletics
Representing East Germany
Olympic Games
Gold medal – first place	1980 Moscow	400 m
Silver medal – second place	1980 Moscow	4 × 400 m relay
World Championships
Gold medal – first place	1983 Helsinki	200 m
Gold medal – first place	1983 Helsinki	4 × 100 m relay
Gold medal – first place	1983 Helsinki	4 × 400 m relay
Silver medal – second place	1983 Helsinki	100 m
Friendship Games
Gold medal – first place	1984 Moscow	400 m
European Championships
Gold medal – first place	1978 Prague	400 m
Gold medal – first place	1978 Prague	4 × 400 m relay
Gold medal – first place	1982 Athens	400 m
Gold medal – first place	1982 Athens	4 × 400 m relay
Gold medal – first place	1986 Stuttgart	400 m
Gold medal – first place	1986 Stuttgart	4 × 400 m relay
European Indoor Championships
Gold medal – first place	1977 San Sebastián	400 m
Silver medal – second place	1979 Vienna	60 m
Bronze medal – third place	1981 Grenoble	50 m
Summer Universiade
Gold medal – first place	1979 Mexico City	200 m
- Updated on 30 June 2015

Marita Koch (later Meier-Koch; born 18 February 1957) is a German former sprint track and field athlete. During her career she set 16 world records in outdoor sprints as well as 14 world records in indoor events. Her record of 47.60 in the 400 metres, set on 6 October 1985, still stands.

== Biography ==
Born in Wismar, East Germany, Marita Koch displayed exceptional speed even as a young child and was defeating boys much older than herself in sprint races whilst at school. By the time she had turned 15 years old, she was training under Wolfgang Meier. Meier worked as a naval engineer, but also coached athletics part-time. Koch and Meier moved to Rostock where Koch began to study medicine. However, she decided to stop her studies and focus on running instead. Koch was coached by Meier for her entire career, and they later married. She retained her maiden name, and is now known as Marita Koch-Meier. She and her husband have a daughter named Ulrike. In 2019, Ulrike married Tony Drechsler, son of former East German long jump world record holder Heike Drechsler.

Koch has held world records over several distances from 50 m to 400 m. Some of her best performances are as follows:

- 100 m 10.83 seconds (+1.7) West Berlin (FRG) 8 June 1983
- 200 m 21.71 seconds (+0.7) Karl Marx Stadt (GDR) 10 June 1979
- 400 m 47.60 seconds Bruce Stadium, Canberra (AUS) 6 October 1985

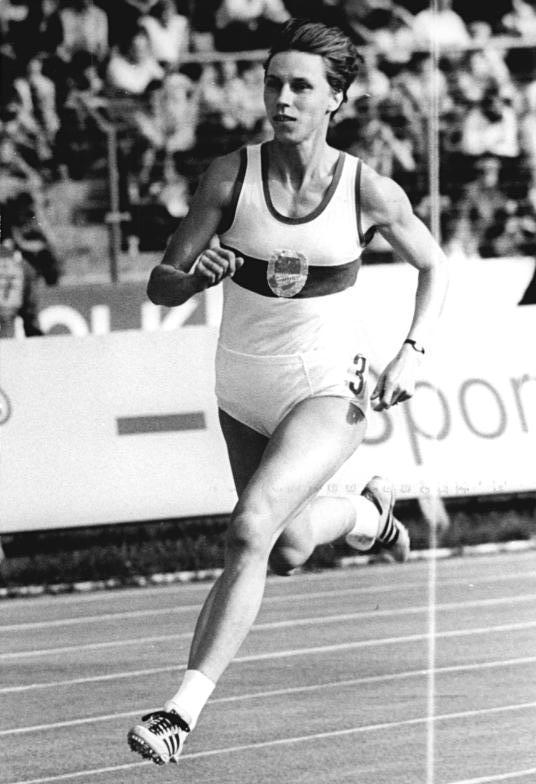
Koch at the 1984 East German Championships in Athletics in Erfurt, Thuringia, Germany

Koch ran a 400 m quarterfinal at the 1976 Summer Olympics in Montreal (51.87 seconds), but withdrew due to injury. She set her first world record in 1977 in Milan, when she ran a 400 m indoors in 51.8 seconds. The following year, she set her first outdoor record at 400 m in 49.19 seconds. She topped this with another two world records within a month. In 1979 Koch became the first woman to run a 200 m in under 22 seconds. Her time of 21.71 seconds (wind +0.7 m/s) set at Karl Marx Stadt stood as the world record for nine years. She tied her own 200 m world record in 1984 (21.71 seconds +0.3 m/s Potsdam). However, her 200 m world record was equaled twice in 1986 by Heike Drechsler. One of Drechsler's 21.71 second 200 m performances was achieved into a headwind whereas both of Koch's performances of 21.71 had a tailwind.

At the Moscow Olympics of 1980 Koch won the 400 m race. Three weeks before the 1984 Olympic Games, she equaled her own record, but the East German boycott prevented her from competing in the games. She also won the European Championships at 400 m in 1978, 1982 and 1986. She remained the European record holder for the 200 m until 28 August 2015 when Dafne Schippers won the 200 m final at the 2015 World Championships with a time of 21.63 seconds. As a member of East Germany's relay teams, Koch also set more world records. They set new world records in the 4 × 100 m in 1979 and 1983. The same team became second in the 4 × 400 m relay in the 1980 Olympic Games. They also set world records over the same distance in 1980, 1982 and 1984. In October 1986, she was awarded a Star of People's Friendship in gold (second class) for her sporting success.

Koch retired from running in 1987 as one of Germany's most successful athletes. She had suffered from an Achilles tendon injury She and Meier own a sports goods store in Rostock.

=== The 400 m world record run ===
On 6 October 1985 at the year's World Cup meet, Koch set the current 400 m world record of 47.60 seconds. The world record 400 m run had been well planned, and her basic speed and speed endurance proven in several training runs in the weeks prior. One week prior to her 400 m world record run, anecdotal reports suggest that Koch had run the 200 m in 21.56 seconds (fully automatic time). This 200 m performance was never verified by the IAAF and remains unofficial.

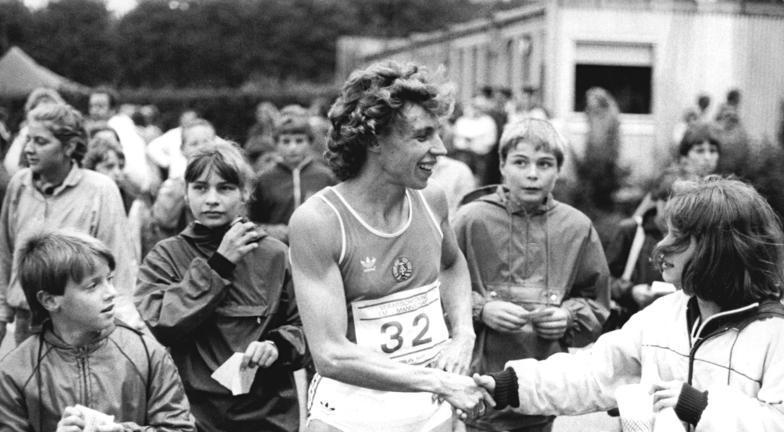
Koch in East Berlin, 21 August 1986

In her world record run, Koch, running in lane 2, came out of the blocks at a scorching pace and eliminated the stagger on most of her competitors by the end of the first bend. Her 100 m split time was reported to be 11.3 seconds, while her 200 m split time was reported to be 22.4 seconds. At the halfway point in the race, she had completely destroyed most of a world class field. Her 300 m split was reported to be 34.1 seconds (hand timed), the all-time best performance for this distance. During the final stages of the race, the original video footage only captured Koch and Olga Bryzhina (née Vladykina) of the former USSR, who was trailing behind, but closing the gap. The rest of the field had been left so far behind that they were not captured by the camera as Koch and Vladykina crossed the finishing line. Third place was Lillie Leatherwood, more than two seconds behind Vladykina. Koch had gained too much of an advantage in the early stages of the race, and Vladykina was unable to pull in Koch before the finish line. Vladykina also ran her all-time best performance (48.27 seconds) in that race.

In a 400 m race, the only women to have broken the 48-second barrier are Koch, Sydney McLaughlin-Levrone (47.78 seconds, Tokyo, 2025), Marileidy Paulino (47.98 seconds, Tokyo, 2025), and Jarmila Kratochvílová (47.99 seconds, Helsinki, 1983). Kratochvílová was Koch's main rival over the distance and also a 400 m world record holder in the early 1980s.

== Drug use controversy ==
Koch's achievements, along with the performances of other East German female athletes, have long been under suspicion that they were achieved with the aid of illegal performance-enhancing drugs. These drugs were not detectable at the time. In 1991, German anti-drug activists Brigitte Berendonk and Werner Franke were able to save several doctoral theses and other documents written by scientists working for the East German drug research programme.

The documents list the dosage and timetables for the administration of anabolic steroids to many athletes of the former DDR, with one of them being Marita Koch. According to the sources, Koch did use the anabolic steroid Oral-Turinabol (4-Chlorodehydromethyltestosterone) from 1981 to 1984 with dosages ranging from 530 to 1460 mg/year.

Berendonk and Franke also discovered a letter allegedly written by Koch, complaining that her rival, Bärbel Wöckel, was receiving higher doses of steroids than her because Wöckel's uncle was president of the pharmaceutical company Jenapharm.

== See also ==
- German all-time top lists – 100 metres
- German all-time top lists – 200 metres

Records
Preceded by Irena Szewińska	Women's 400 metres World Record holder 1978-07-02 — 1983-08-10	Succeeded by Jarmila Kratochvílová
Preceded by Jarmila Kratochvílová	Women's 400 metres World Record holder 1985-10-06 —	Succeeded by Incumbent
Awards and achievements
Preceded by Rosemarie Ackermann	East German Sportswoman of the Year; 1978–1979	Succeeded by Maxi Gnauck
Preceded by Rosemarie Ackermann	Women's Track & Field Athlete of the Year; 1978–1979	Succeeded by Ilona Briesenick
Preceded by Ute Geweniger	East German Sportswoman of the Year; 1982–1983	Succeeded by Katarina Witt
Preceded by Katarina Witt	East German Sportswoman of the Year; 1985	Succeeded by Heike Drechsler
Preceded by Tracy Caulkins	United Press International; Athlete of the Year; 1979	Succeeded by Hanni Wenzel
Preceded by Chris Evert Lloyd	United Press International; Athlete of the Year; 1982	Succeeded by Jarmila Kratochvílová
Preceded by Evelyn Ashford	Women's Track & Field Athlete of the Year; 1982	Succeeded by Jarmila Kratochvílová
Preceded by Evelyn Ashford	Women's Track & Field Athlete of the Year; 1985	Succeeded by Jackie Joyner-Kersee
Sporting positions
Preceded by Irena Szewińska	Women's 200 m Best Year Performance; 1978–1979	Succeeded by Bärbel Wöckel
Preceded by Evelyn Ashford	Women's 200 m Best Year Performance; 1982–1985	Succeeded by Heike Drechsler
