= 1987 World Championships in Athletics – Women's 400 metres hurdles =

These are the official results of the Women's 400 metres Hurdles event at the 1987 IAAF World Championships in Rome, Italy. There were a total number of 35 participating athletes, with five qualifying heats, two semi-finals and the final held on Thursday 1987-09-03.

== Final ==
RANK	FINAL	TIME
1st place, gold medalist(s)	Sabine Busch (GDR)	53.62 CR
2nd place, silver medalist(s)	Debbie Flintoff-King (AUS)	54.19
3rd place, bronze medalist(s)	Cornelia Ullrich (GDR)	54.31
4.	Sandra Farmer (JAM)	54.38
5.	Tuija Helander-Kuusisto (FIN)	54.62
6.	Anna Ambrazienė (URS)	55.68
7.	Schowonda Williams (USA)	55.86
8.	Judi Brown-King (USA)	56.10

== Semi-finals ==
- Held on Tuesday 1987-09-01

RANK	HEAT 1	TIME
1.	Sabine Busch (GDR)	54.41
2.	Sandra Farmer (JAM)	54.68
3.	Tuija Helander-Kuusisto (FIN)	54.76
4.	Schowonda Williams (USA)	54.82
5.	Margarita Khromova (URS)	54.86
6.	LaTanya Sheffield (USA)	56.65
7.	Rose Tata-Muya (KEN)	57.65
—	Maria Usifo (NGR)	DNS

RANK	HEAT 2	TIME
1.	Cornelia Ullrich (GDR)	54.72
2.	Debbie Flintoff-King (AUS)	55.08
3.	Anna Ambrazienė (URS)	55.47
4.	Judi Brown-King (USA)	55.55
5.	Gudrun Abt (FRG)	55.59
6.	P.T. Usha (IND)	55.89
7.	Christina Wennberg (SWE)	57.64
8.	Irmgard Trojer (ITA)	57.86

== Qualifying heats ==
- Held on Monday 1987-08-31

RANK	HEAT 1	TIME
1.	Sabine Busch (GDR)	55.51
2.	Anna Ambrazienė (URS)	56.50
3.	Nawal El Moutawakil (MAR)	57.21
4.	Jenny Laurendet (AUS)	57.41
5.	Barbara Johnson (IRL)	58.72
6.	Tania Fernández (CUB)	58.78
7.	Mariam Zewde (ETH)	1:00.57

RANK	HEAT 2	TIME
1.	LaTanya Sheffield (USA)	55.93
2.	Debbie Flintoff-King (AUS)	56.31
3.	Christina Wennberg (SWE)	56.91
4.	Irmgard Trojer (ITA)	57.09
5.	Hélène Huart (FRA)	57.13
6.	Maria João Lopes (POR)	58.86
7.	Semra Aksu (TUR)	59.13

RANK	HEAT 3	TIME
1.	Judi Brown-King (USA)	55.35
2.	Tuija Helander-Kuusisto (FIN)	55.42
3.	P.T. Usha (IND)	55.73
4.	Maria Usifo (NGR)	56.13
5.	Helga Halldorsdottir (ISL)	57.82
6.	Marie Womplou (CIV)	58.46
7.	Gerda Haas (AUT)	58.65

RANK	HEAT 4	TIME
1.	Margarita Khromova (URS)	55.21
2.	Schowonda Williams (USA)	55.53
3.	Gudrun Abt (FRG)	55.83
4.	Liliana Chala (ECU)	58.39
5.	Gwen Wall (CAN)	58.66
6.	Maria do Carmo Fialho (BRA)	58.93
–	Genowefa Błaszak (POL)	DQ

RANK	HEAT 5	TIME
1.	Cornelia Ullrich (GDR)	56.75
2.	Sandra Farmer (JAM)	56.76
3.	Rose Tata-Muya (KEN)	57.11
4.	Cristina Pérez (ESP)	57.23
5.	Erika Szopori (HUN)	58.09
6.	Sally Flemming (AUS)	58.87
–	Fatimata Podie (BUR)	DQ

== See also ==
- 1984 Women's Olympic 400m Hurdles (Los Angeles)
- 1986 Women's European Championships 400m Hurdles (Stuttgart)
- 1988 Women's Olympic 400m Hurdles (Seoul)
- 1990 Women's European Championships 400m Hurdles (Split)
