= Athletics at the 1988 Summer Olympics – Women's 400 metres hurdles =

Women's 400 metres hurdles at the Games of the XXIV Olympiad
- Venue: Olympic Stadium
- Dates: 25 September 1988 (heats); 27 September 1988 (semi-finals); 28 September 1988 (final)
- Competitors: 35 from 25 nations
- Winning time: 53.17 OR

Medalists
| 1st place, gold medalist(s) | | Debbie Flintoff-King; Australia |
| 2nd place, silver medalist(s) | | Tatyana Ledovskaya; Soviet Union |
| 3rd place, bronze medalist(s) | | Ellen Fiedler; East Germany |

The Women's 400 metres Hurdles at the 1988 Summer Olympics in Seoul, South Korea had an entry list of 35 competitors, with five qualifying heats and two semifinals (16) before the final (8) took place on Wednesday September 28, 1988.

In 1987, the former world record holder Sabine Busch of the GDR, improved her best to 53.24 seconds, before going on to win the World Championship title in Rome in 53.62 secs, with Debbie Flintoff-King of Australia second, GDR team-mate Cornelia Ullrich third, and Jamaica's Sandra Farmer fourth. Both Ullrich and Farmer, who was now competing for the USA as Sandra Farmer-Patrick, failed to make it to Seoul. Farmer-Patrick was disqualified in her semifinal at the US Olympic trials for a lane infringement, while Ullrich missed out on a spot on the GDR Olympic team to Ellen Fiedler and Susanne Losch.

In Seoul, Fiedler set a new Olympic record in the heats, running 54.58 secs. Flintoff-King then further improved the Olympic record to 54.00 in the first semifinal, finishing just ahead of the little-known Soviet Tatyana Ledovskaya, who ran 54.01. Fiedler won the second semifinal in 54.28, with world champion Busch fourth.

In the final, Ledovskaya (lane 3) made the fastest start and still held a narrow lead at the eighth hurdle, with Fiedler (lane 6) second, Busch (lane 7) third and Flintoff-King (lane 5) back in fifth. By the tenth hurdle, Ledovskaya still led from Fiedler, with Flintoff-King closing and moving into third ahead of Bush. Flintoff-King continued to close on the run-in and passed Ledovskaya in the final stride, winning in the new Olympic record time of 53.17, to move to second on the world all-time list. Ledovskaya took the silver in 53.18, with Fiedler holding off Busch for the bronze, running 53.63 to Busch's 53.69. With six of the top seven running personal bests, the Seoul final rewrote the all-time list, with fifth-placed Sally Gunnell (54.03) and sixth-placed Gudrun Abt (54.04), moving to number 10 and 11 on the all-time list.

== Medalists ==
| Gold | Debbie Flintoff-King; Australia |
| Silver | Tatyana Ledovskaya; Soviet Union |
| Bronze | Ellen Fiedler; East Germany |

== Records ==
These were the standing World and Olympic records (in seconds) prior to the 1988 Summer Olympics.

| World record | 52.94 | (Soviet Union) Marina Stepanova | Stuttgart (FRG) | September 17, 1986 |
| Olympic record | 54.61 | (Morocco) Nawal El Moutawakel | Los Angeles (USA) | August 8, 1984 |

The following Olympic records were set during this competition.

| Date | Event | Athlete | Time | OR | WR |
|---|---|---|---|---|---|
| September 25, 1988 | Quarterfinal | Ellen Fiedler (GDR) | 54.58 s | OR | |
| September 26, 1988 | Semifinal | Debbie Flintoff-King (AUS) | 54.00 s | OR | |
| September 28, 1988 | Final | Debbie Flintoff-King (AUS) | 53.17 s | OR | |

== Final ==
| RANK | FINAL | TIME |
|---|---|---|
| | Debbie Flintoff-King (AUS) | 53.17(OR) |
| | Tatyana Ledovskaya (URS) | 53.18 |
| | Ellen Fiedler (GDR) | 53.63 |
| 4. | Sabine Busch (GDR) | 53.69 |
| 5. | Sally Gunnell (GBR) | 54.03 |
| 6. | Gudrun Abt (FRG) | 54.04 |
| 7. | Tatyana Kourochkina (URS) | 54.39 |
| 8. | LaTanya Sheffield (USA) | 55.32 |

== Semi finals ==
| RANK | HEAT 1 | TIME |
|---|---|---|
| 1. | Debbie Flintoff-King (AUS) | 54.00(OR) |
| 2. | Tatyana Ledovskaya (URS) | 54.01 |
| 3. | LaTanya Sheffield (USA) | 54.36 |
| 4. | Sally Gunnell (GBR) | 54.48 |
| 5. | Anita Protti (SUI) | 54.56 |
| 6. | Susanne Losch (GDR) | 55.56 |
| 7. | Genowefa Błaszak (POL) | 56.76 |
| 8. | Gretha Tromp (NED) | 57.57 |

| RANK | HEAT 2 | TIME |
|---|---|---|
| 1. | Ellen Fiedler (GDR) | 54.28 |
| 2. | Tatyana Kourochkina (URS) | 54.46 |
| 3. | Gudrun Abt (FRG) | 54.53 |
| 4. | Sabine Busch (GDR) | 54.71 |
| 5. | Cristina Pérez (ESP) | 55.23 |
| 6. | Elaine McLaughlin (GBR) | 55.91 |
| 7. | Schowonda Williams (USA) | 56.71 |
| 8. | Chantal Beaugeant (FRA) | 56.94 |

== Qualifying heats ==
| RANK | HEAT 1 | TIME |
|---|---|---|
| 1. | Susanne Losch (GDR) | 55.90 |
| 2. | Tatyana Ledovskaya (URS) | 55.91 |
| 3. | Elaine McLaughlin (GBR) | 56.11 |
| 4. | Rose Tata-Muya (KEN) | 56.18 |
| 5. | Marie Womplou (CIV) | 57.35 |
| 6. | Christine Wynn (CAN) | 58.00 |
| 7. | P.T. Usha (IND) | 59.55 |

| RANK | HEAT 2 | TIME |
|---|---|---|
| 1. | Sabine Busch (GDR) | 55.96 |
| 2. | Gretha Tromp (NED) | 56.11 |
| 3. | Genowefa Błaszak (POL) | 56.18 |
| 4. | Jennifer Laurendet (AUS) | 56.44 |
| 5. | Rosey Edeh (CAN) | 56.59 |
| 6. | Ruth Kyalisiima (UGA) | 59.62 |
| 7. | Nenita Adan (PHI) | 1:01.92 |

| RANK | HEAT 3 | TIME |
|---|---|---|
| 1. | Ellen Fiedler (GDR) | 54.58(OR) |
| 2. | Anita Protti (SUI) | 54.81 |
| 3. | Tatyana Kurochkina (URS) | 55.04 |
| 4. | Latanya Sheffield (USA) | 55.61 |
| 5. | Maria Usifo (NGR) | 55.99 |
| 6. | Helga Halldórsdóttir (ISL) | 58.99 |
| 7. | Kim Soon-Ja (KOR) | 59.78 |

| RANK | HEAT 4 | TIME |
|---|---|---|
| 1. | Debbie Flintoff-King (AUS) | 54.99 |
| 2. | Cristina Pérez (ESP) | 55.29 |
| 3. | Sally Gunnell (GBR) | 55.44 |
| 4. | Irmgard Trojer (ITA) | 55.74 |
| 5. | Leslie Maxie (USA) | 57.60 |
| 6. | Barbara Johnson (IRL) | 58.61 |
| 7. | Chang Fen-Hwa (TPE) | 1:00.16 |

| RANK | HEAT 5 | TIME |
|---|---|---|
| 1. | Gudrun Abt (FRG) | 55.72 |
| 2. | Schowonda Williams (USA) | 55.98 |
| 3. | Chantal Beaugeant (FRA) | 56.03 |
| 4. | Sally Hamilton-Fleming (AUS) | 56.08 |
| 5. | Liliana Chalá (ECU) | 57.15 |
| 6. | Semra Aksu (TUR) | 57.20 |
| 7. | Simone Laidlow (GBR) | 59.28 |

== See also ==
- 1986 Women's European Championships 400m Hurdles (Stuttgart)
- 1987 Women's World Championships 400m Hurdles (Rome)
- 1990 Women's European Championships 400m Hurdles (Split)
- 1991 Women's World Championships 400m Hurdles (Tokyo)
