= 1986 European Athletics Championships – Women's 400 metres hurdles =

Women's 400 metres hurdles at the European Athletics Championships
- Venue: Neckarstadion
- Location: Stuttgart, West Germany
- Dates: 28, 29, and 30 August 1986
- Competitors: 24 from 15 nations
- Winning time: 53.32 s WR

Medalists
| gold medal | Marina Stepanova | Soviet Union |
| silver medal | Sabine Busch | East Germany |
| bronze medal | Cornelia Feuerbach | East Germany |

These are the official results of the Women's 400 metres hurdles event at the 1986 European Championships in Stuttgart, West Germany, held at Neckarstadion on 28, 29, and 30 August 1986.

== Results ==
=== Final ===
30 August

| Rank | Name | Nationality | Time | Notes |
|---|---|---|---|---|
| 1st place, gold medalist(s) | Marina Stepanova | Soviet Union | 53.32 | WR |
| 2nd place, silver medalist(s) | Sabine Busch | East Germany | 53.60 | |
| 3rd place, bronze medalist(s) | Cornelia Feuerbach | East Germany | 54.13 | |
| 4 | Ann-Louise Skoglund | Sweden | 54.15 | NR |
| 5 | Genowefa Błaszak | Poland | 54.74 | |
| 6 | Ellen Fiedler | East Germany | 54.90 | |
| 7 | Cristieana Matei | Romania | 55.23 | |
| 8 | Margarita Khromova | Soviet Union | 55.56 | |

=== Semi-finals ===
29 August

==== Semi-final 1 ====
| Rank | Name | Nationality | Time | Notes |
|---|---|---|---|---|
| 1 | Cornelia Feuerbach | East Germany | 54.72 | Q |
| 2 | Ellen Fiedler | East Germany | 54.76 | Q |
| 3 | Genowefa Błaszak | Poland | 54.83 | Q |
| 4 | Margarita Khromova | Soviet Union | 55.37 | Q |
| 5 | Nicoleta Căruţaşu | Romania | 55.95 | |
| 6 | Christina Wennberg | Sweden | 56.69 | |
| 7 | Irmgard Trojer | Italy | 58.20 | |
| | Gerda Haas | Austria | DNF | |

==== Semi-final 2 ====
| Rank | Name | Nationality | Time | Notes |
|---|---|---|---|---|
| 1 | Marina Stepanova | Soviet Union | 53.83 | CR Q |
| 2 | Sabine Busch | East Germany | 53.97 | Q |
| 3 | Ann-Louise Skoglund | Sweden | 54.93 | Q |
| 4 | Cristieana Matei | Romania | 55.67 | Q |
| 5 | Tuija Helander | Finland | 56.21 | |
| 6 | Gudrun Abt | West Germany | 56.66 | |
| 7 | Caroline Plüss | Switzerland | 57.15 | NR |
| 8 | Monika Klebe | Sweden | 57.18 | |

=== Heats ===
28 August

==== Heat 1 ====
| Rank | Name | Nationality | Time | Notes |
|---|---|---|---|---|
| 1 | Cristieana Matei | Romania | 56.46 | Q |
| 2 | Cornelia Feuerbach | East Germany | 56.50 | Q |
| 3 | Genowefa Błaszak | Poland | 56.52 | Q |
| 4 | Tuija Helander | Finland | 56.87 | Q |
| 5 | Christina Wennberg | Sweden | 57.27 | q |
| 6 | Anne Gundersen | Norway | 58.01 | |
| 7 | Montserrat Pujol | Spain | 58.14 | |
| 8 | Giuseppina Cirulli | Italy | 58.37 | |

==== Heat 2 ====
| Rank | Name | Nationality | Time | Notes |
|---|---|---|---|---|
| 1 | Sabine Busch | East Germany | 55.42 | Q |
| 2 | Margarita Khromova | Soviet Union | 55.69 | Q |
| 3 | Nicoleta Căruţaşu | Romania | 56.82 | Q |
| 4 | Gerda Haas | Austria | 56.95 | NR Q |
| 5 | Caroline Plüss | Switzerland | 57.23 | NR q |
| 6 | Monika Klebe | Sweden | 57.83 | q |
| 7 | Beate Holzapfel | West Germany | 58.52 | |
| 8 | Semra Aksu | Turkey | 59.25 | |

==== Heat 3 ====
| Rank | Name | Nationality | Time | Notes |
|---|---|---|---|---|
| 1 | Marina Stepanova | Soviet Union | 54.68 | Q |
| 2 | Ellen Fiedler | East Germany | 55.09 | Q |
| 3 | Ann-Louise Skoglund | Sweden | 56.56 | Q |
| 4 | Gudrun Abt | West Germany | 57.02 | Q |
| 5 | Irmgard Trojer | Italy | 57.81 | q |
| 6 | Yvette Wray | United Kingdom | 57.89 | |
| 7 | Cristina Pérez | Spain | 58.19 | |
| 8 | Helga Halldórsdóttir | Iceland | 58.24 | |

== Participation ==
According to an unofficial count, 24 athletes from 15 countries participated in the event.

- Austria (1)
- East Germany (3)
- Finland (1)
- Iceland (1)
- Italy (2)
- Norway (1)
- Poland (1)
- Romania (2)
- Soviet Union (2)
- Spain (2)
- Sweden (3)
- Switzerland (1)
- Turkey (1)
- United Kingdom (1)
- West Germany (2)

== See also ==
- 1982 Women's European Championships 400m Hurdles (Athens)
- 1983 Women's World Championships 400m Hurdles (Helsinki)
- 1984 Women's Olympic 400m Hurdles (Moscow)
- 1987 Women's World Championships 400m Hurdles (Rome)
- 1988 Women's Olympic 400m Hurdles (Seoul)
- 1990 Women's European Championships 400m Hurdles (Split)
