= Petra Krug =

German hurdler

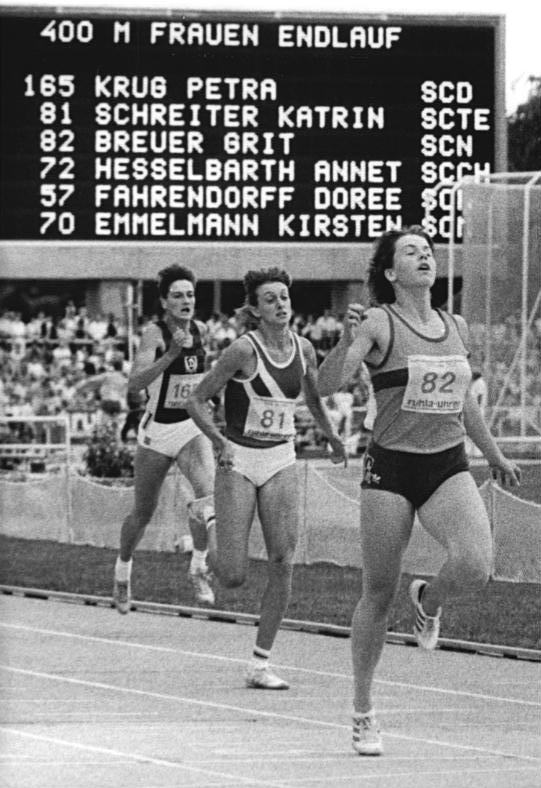
Krug (left) came third in the flat 400m in the 1989 GDR championships, behind Grit Breuer and Katrin Schreiter

Petra Krug (born 9 November 1963 in Dresden) is a retired East German hurdler. She represented the sports clubs SC Einheit Dresden and SC Dynamo Berlin, and became East German champion in 1989.

Krug finished fifth at the 1983 World Championships in Helsinki.

In 1989, Krug won the European Cup in Gateshead, defeating Sally Gunnell and Tatyana Ledovskaya. At the World Cup later that year in Barcelona, she finished fourth behind Sandra Farmer-Patrick, Ledovskaya and Gunnell. She reached the final at the 1990 European Championships in Split, but was forced to withdraw because of injury.

Her personal best time was 54.35 seconds, achieved in July 1989 in Bryansk. This ranks her ninth among German 400 m hurdlers, behind Sabine Busch, Cornelia Ullrich, Ellen Fiedler, Heike Meissner, Gudrun Abt, Silvia Rieger, Susanne Losch and Karin Rossley.

== International competitions ==
Year	Competition	Venue	Position	Event	Notes
Representing East Germany
1983	World Championships	Helsinki, Finland	5th	400 m hurdles	54.76
1989	European Cup	Gateshead, England	1st	400 m hurdles	54.72
1989	World Cup	Barcelona, Spain	4th	400 m hurdles	55.56
1990	European Championships	Split, Yugoslavia	DNS (final)	400 m hurdles	55.93 (sf)

DNS = did not start. SF = semifinal.
