= Athletics at the 1988 Summer Olympics – Women's 4 × 400 metres relay =

Women's 4 × 400 metres relay at the Games of the XXIV Olympiad
- Venue: Seoul Olympic Stadium
- Date: 30 September 1988 (heats); 1 October 1988 (final)
- Competitors: 61 from 13 nations
- Teams: 61
- Winning time: 3:15.17 WR

Medalists
1st place, gold medalist(s)		Tatyana Ledovskaya, Olga Nazarova, Mariya Pinigina, Olha Bryzhina, Lyudmila Dzhigalova*	Soviet Union
2nd place, silver medalist(s)		Denean Howard, Diane Dixon, Valerie Brisco-Hooks, Florence Griffith Joyner, Sherri Howard*, Lillie Leatherwood*	United States
3rd place, bronze medalist(s)		Dagmar Neubauer, Kirsten Emmelmann, Sabine Busch, Petra Müller, Grit Breuer* * only competed in the preliminary heats.	East Germany

These are the official results of the Women's 4 × 400 m Relay event at the 1988 Summer Olympics in Seoul, South Korea. There were a total number of sixteen nations competing.

Soviet Union had the gold and bronze medalists from the 400 metres race and the silver medalist from the 400 hurdles. With the retirement of East German Marita Koch and Czech Jarmila Kratochvílová, gold medalist Olha Bryzhina had the fastest time of any active athlete when she finished a close second behind Koch's world record three years earlier, the #3 runner in history at the time. Her 48.64 earlier in the week showed she had not lost a step. The Soviet's fourth runner had a bronze medal from the 1983 world championships.

From the gun, hurdler Tatyana Ledovskaya looked to have a slight lead over former high school athlete Denean Howard. Just as she had done in the hurdles, Ledovskaya tied up a bit on the final straight, Howard put the US in first at the handoff with a 49.8 out of starting blocks. Going through the third turn, it was already clear this was a two team race. Diane Dixon got to the break line first and took over the lead position over Olga Nazarova. After making the pass, Nazarova opened up about a 10-meter lead on Dixon going into the handoff. Mariya Pinigina took the handoff and extended the lead another five metres by the 200 mark against Valerie Brisco-Hooks. But through the turn Brisco-Hooks started to make some headway. On the final straight, Pinigina began to tie up. The lead evaporated as Brisco-Hooks gained with every step. At the handoff, it was barely a meter, with Florence Griffith-Joyner taking the baton and strategically staying behind Bryzhina. Down the backstretch and through the final turn, Griffith-Joyner stayed the same distance behind Bryzhina as if there was a rope between the two. At the end of the turn, Griffith-Joyner looked to gain a little but Bryzhina sensed the attack and accelerated away, widening the gap slightly. In the final 50 metres, Griffith-Joyner made one more attack, but it was not enough to close the gap between herself and Bryzhina. She was able to close down the gap to 2 metres by the finish but it was a clear win for the Soviets in their final appearance in an Olympic relay.

As it turned out, both Nazarova and Bryzhina tied Taťána Kocembová for the third fastest relay splits in history to that point in time with 47.8. Griffith-Joyner's 48.0 is next on that list. Since then, only Allyson Felix, Sydney McLaughlin, and Femke Bol have run faster.

The American time 3:15.51 was more than four tenths of a second faster than the four-year-old world record. The winning Soviet time 3:15.17 improved the world record by three quarters of a second. Since that day, more than a quarter of a century, those two times remain the fastest in history. No team has come within a second and a half of the world record until the U.S. women ran women ran 3:15.27 at the 2024 Summer Olympics. Only four squads from 1988 to 2023, all American Olympic or world championship teams, had since beaten the East German time from a distant third place in this race.

== Records ==
These were the standing World and Olympic records (in minutes) prior to the 1988 Summer Olympics.

World record	3:15.92	(East Germany) Gesine Walther (East Germany) Sabine Busch (East Germany) Dagmar Rübsam (East Germany) Marita Koch	Erfurt (GDR)	June 3, 1984
Olympic record	3:18.29	(United States) Lillie Leatherwood (United States) Denean Howard (United States) Valerie Brisco-Hooks (United States) Chandra Cheeseborough	Los Angeles (USA)	August 11, 1984

The following World and Olympic record (in minutes) was set during this competition.

Date	Event	Athlete	Time	OR	WR
October 1, 1988	Final	Tatyana Ledovskaya (URS); Olga Nazarova (URS); Mariya Pinigina (URS); Olha Bryzhina (URS)	3:15.17	OR	WR

== Final ==
- Held on Saturday 1988-10-01

RANK	NATION	ATHLETES	TIME
	Soviet Union	• Tatyana Ledovskaya • Olga Nazarova • Mariya Pinigina • Olha Bryzhina	3:15.17; WR
	United States	• Denean Howard • Diane Dixon • Valerie Brisco-Hooks • Florence Griffith Joyner	3:15.51
	East Germany	• Dagmar Neubauer • Kirsten Emmelmann • Sabine Busch • Petra Müller	3:18.29
4.	West Germany	• Ute Thimm • Helga Arendt • Andrea Thomas • Gudrun Abt	3:22.49
5.	Jamaica	• Sandie Richards • Andrea Thomas • Cathy Rattray-Williams • Sharon Powell	3:23.13
6.	Great Britain	• Linda Keough • Jennifer Stoute • Angela Piggford • Sally Gunnell	3:26.89
7.	France	• Fabienne Ficher • Nathalie Simon • Nadine Debois • Evelyn Elien	3:29.37
—	Canada	• Charmaine Crooks • Molly Killingbeck • Marita Payne-Wiggins • Jillian Richardson	DNF

== Semifinals ==
- Held on Friday 1988-09-30

RANK	NATION	HEAT 1	TIME
1.	East Germany	• Grit Breuer • Dagmar Neubauer • Kirsten Emmelmann • Petra Müller	3:27.37
2.	Canada	• Charmaine Crooks • Esmie Lawrence • Marita Payne-Wiggins • Jillian Richardson	3:27.63
3.	West Germany	• Helga Arendt • Michaela Schabinger • Gisela Kinzel • Gudrun Abt	3:27.75
4.	Great Britain	• Linda Keough • Jennifer Stoute • Janet Smith • Sally Gunnell	3:28.52
5.	France	• Fabienne Ficher • Nathalie Simon • Evelyn Elien • Nadine Debois	3:29.95
6.	Nigeria	• Falilat Ogunkoya • Kehinde Vaughan • Airat Bakare • Mary Onyali	3:30.21
7.	India	• Mercy Kuttanmath Alapurackal • Vandana Rao • Vandana Shanbagh • Shiny Abraham	3:30.21
—	Australia	• Debbie Flintoff-King • Maree Holland • Kerry Johnson • Jennifer Laurendet	DNF

RANK	NATION	HEAT 2	TIME
1.	United States	• Lillie Leatherwood • Sherri Howard • Denean Howard • Diane Dixon	3:25.86
2.	Jamaica	• Marcia Tate • Andrea Thomas • Cathy Rattray-Williams • Sharon Powell	3:26.83
3.	Soviet Union	• Lyudmyla Dzhyhalova • Olga Nazarova • Mariya Pinigina • Olha Bryzhina	3:27.14
4.	Brazil	• Tânia Miranda • Suzete Montalvão • Soraya Telles • Maria Figueiredo	3:36.81
5.	South Korea	• Yang Gyeong-hui • Choi Se-beom • Im Chun-ae • Kim Sun-ja	3:51.09
—	Colombia	• Olga Escalante • Norfalia Carabalí • Amparo Caicedo • Ximena Restrepo	DSQ
—	Uganda	• Jane Ajilo • Grace Buzu • Farida Kyakutema • Ruth Kyalisiima	DNS
—	Spain	• Blanca Lacambra • Esther Lahoz • Cristina Pérez • Teresa Zuñiga	DNS

== See also ==
- 1986 Women's European Championships 4 × 400 m Relay (Stuttgart)
- 1987 Women's World Championships 4 × 400 m Relay (Rome)
- 1990 Women's European Championships 4 × 400 m Relay (Split)
- 1991 Women's World Championships 4 × 400 m Relay (Tokyo)
