= 1991 World Championships in Athletics – Women's 400 metres hurdles =

These are the official results of the Women's 400 metres Hurdles event at the 1991 IAAF World Championships in Tokyo, Japan. There were a total number of 33 participating athletes, with five qualifying heats, two semi-finals and the final held on Thursday August 29, 1991.

== Schedule ==
- All times are Japan Standard Time (UTC+9)

Heats
26.08.1991 – 15:30h
Semi-Finals
27.08.1991 – 17:30h
Final
29.08.1991 – 19:00h

== Final ==
RANK	FINAL	TIME
	Tatyana Ledovskaya (URS)	53.11 CR
	Sally Gunnell (GBR)	53.16
	Janeene Vickers (USA)	53.47
4.	Sandra Farmer-Patrick (USA)	53.95
5.	Kim Batten (USA)	53.98
6.	Anita Protti (SUI)	54.25
7.	Heike Meißner (GER)	55.26
8.	Margarita Ponomaryova (URS)	55.27

== Semi-finals ==
- Held on Tuesday 1991-08-27

RANK	HEAT 1	TIME
1.	Anita Protti (SUI)	54.26
2.	Sandra Farmer-Patrick (USA)	54.44
3.	Janeene Vickers (USA)	54.63
4.	Heike Meißner (GER)	54.77
5.	Gowry Retchakan (GBR)	54.88
6.	Frida Johansson (SWE)	55.36
7.	Anna Chuprina (URS)	55.81
8.	Nezha Bidouane (MAR)	56.62

RANK	HEAT 2	TIME
1.	Sally Gunnell (GBR)	54.24
2.	Tatyana Ledovskaya (URS)	54.36
3.	Kim Batten (USA)	54.70
4.	Margarita Ponomaryova (URS)	55.22
5.	Monica Westén (SWE)	55.51
6.	Irmgard Trojer (ITA)	55.66
7.	Sabine Busch (GER)	55.93
8.	Gudrun Abt (GER)	56.17

== Qualifying heats ==
- Held on Monday 1991-08-26

RANK	HEAT 1	TIME
1.	Janeene Vickers (USA)	54.85
2.	Tatyana Ledovskaya (URS)	54.94
3.	Gowry Retchakan (GBR)	54.95
4.	Frida Johansson (SWE)	55.60
5.	Ann Maenhout (BEL)	58.39
6.	Marie Womplou (CIV)	58.80
7.	Elma Muros-Posadas (PHI)	59.90

RANK	HEAT 2	TIME
1.	Anita Protti (SUI)	54.53
2.	Margarita Ponomaryova (URS)	55.87
3.	Gudrun Abt (GER)	56.16
4.	Lency Montelier (CUB)	57.72
5.	Yanhong Huang (CHN)	58.05
6.	Omotayo Akinremi (NGR)	58.25

RANK	HEAT 3	TIME
1.	Sally Gunnell (GBR)	54.70
2.	Anna Chuprina (URS)	56.15
3.	Sabine Busch (GER)	56.37
4.	Donalda Duprey (CAN)	56.38
5.	Lyn Massey (NZL)	57.55
6.	Junko Hasegawa (JPN)	59.71
7.	Gretha Tromp (NED)	1:00.45

RANK	HEAT 4	TIME
1.	Irmgard Trojer (ITA)	55.77
2.	Kim Batten (USA)	55.77
3.	Monica Westén (SWE)	55.79
4.	Deon Hemmings (JAM)	57.13
5.	Nicoleta Căruțașu (ROM)	57.26
6.	Liliana Chalá (ECU)	1:01.49
7.	Mirenda Francourt (SEY)	1:05.92

RANK	HEAT 5	TIME
1.	Sandra Farmer-Patrick (USA)	55.81
2.	Heike Meißner (GER)	56.00
3.	Nezha Bidouane (MAR)	56.35
4.	Rosey Edeh (CAN)	57.32
5.	Jacqui Parker (GBR)	57.81
6.	Reawadee Srithoa (THA)	58.74
7.	Mari Bjone (NOR)	59.00

== See also ==
- 1988 Women's Olympic 400m Hurdles (Seoul)
- 1990 Women's European Championships 400m Hurdles (Split)
- 1992 Women's Olympic 400m Hurdles (Barcelona)
