= Lim Chun-ae =

South Korean middle-distance runner

Medal record

Women's athletics

Representing South Korea

Asian Games
Gold medal – first place	1986 Seoul	800 m
Gold medal – first place	1986 Seoul	1500 m
Gold medal – first place	1986 Seoul	3000 m

Asian Championships
Bronze medal – third place	1987 Singapore	800 m

Lim Chun-ae (Korean: 임춘애; born 1 July 1969) is a South Korean former track and field athlete who competed in middle-distance running events. She won the 800 metres, 1500 metres and 3000 metres titles as a teenager at the 1986 Asian Games held in Seoul. She was South Korea's first female athletics gold medallist at the Asian Games and is the only athlete to have achieved that triple at the same games.

She represented her country at the 1988 Seoul Olympics, but did not perform as well and retired shortly after. Lim was also a bronze medallist in the 800 m at the Asian Athletics Championships in 1987.

== Career ==
Born into a poor rural family, her father died when she was still a child and before he died he encouraged her to become self-sufficient and independent. She was supported by her single mother, who worked in a restaurant. Lim found a talent for running at school, winning her middle-school race then steadily improving until she won the 3000 metres at the Korean National Sports Festival. The 1986 Asian Games in Seoul saw her become a national celebrity. At the age of seventeen she swept the middle-distance medals at the games, winning the 800 metres and 1500 metres, then the 3000 m in an Asian Games record time. She was the first South Korean woman to win an athletics title at the Asian Games, and only the second middle-distance winner for her nation, after Choi Yun-chil in 1954.

Following this victory, interviews with her were published highlighting her poor background, making particular mention of her reliance on ramen (noodle soup) and her envy of the food her richer friends ate. She earned the nickname "Ramen Girl" and was well-rewarded for her efforts at the Asian Games, reportedly earning around US$250,000 in corporate and government support.

The teenage Lim continued to train with a focus on the forthcoming Olympic Games on home soil. The 1987 Asian Athletics Championships was her next major international outing, but she did not perform as well, leaving the competition with one medal (a bronze) from the 800 m and beaten by not only China's Jiang Shuling but also national rival Choi Se-bum. That year she was hospitalised by her coach, who beat her in the head and punctured her eardrum. The incident drew international consternation and her coach, Kim Pum Il, publicly apologised, but such was the culture to succeed that the pair continued to work together. Kim was not punished by the Korean Sports Association and a spokesman confirmed that it was common practice for coaches to slap and whip their charges as a form of encouragement. Even Lim herself stated of the incident: "I blame myself for not having done my best to improve my record".

Lim was selected for the home Korean team for the 1988 Seoul Olympics, running in the 3000 m and also as part of the women's 4×400 metres relay team. By then a student at Ewha Womans University, the nineteen-year-old was nominated to be the last carrier of the Olympic torch into the stadium, handing it off to Sohn Kee-chung (Korea's first Olympic medallist and 1936 marathon champion) to light the cauldron.

The high expectations of South Korean for Lim's Olympic debut were not met. In the 3000 m she was eliminated in the first round and finished some ten seconds slower than she had done in winning the Asian Games title two years earlier. The South Korean women's relay quartet were of a low calibre and Yang Kyoung-Hee, Choi Se-bum, Lim and Kim Soon-Ja were by far the slowest finishes in the qualifying round, crossing the line nearly fifteen seconds after the next slowest team.

== International competitions ==
Year	Competition	Venue	Position	Event	Notes
1986	Asian Games	Seoul, South Korea	1st	800 m	2:05.72
1986	Asian Games	Seoul, South Korea	1st	1500 m	4:21.38
1986	Asian Games	Seoul, South Korea	1st	3000 m	9:11.92 GR
1987	Asian Championships	Singapore	3rd	800 m	2:05.39
1988	Olympic Games	Seoul, South Korea	15th (heats)	3000 m	9:21.18
1988	Olympic Games	Seoul, South Korea	5th (heats)	4 × 400 m relay	3:51.09
