= Athletics at the 1992 Summer Olympics – Women's 400 metres hurdles =

Women's 400 metres hurdles at the Games of the XXV Olympiad
- Venue: Estadi Olímpic de Montjuïc
- Dates: 2 August 1992 (heats); 3 August 1992 (semi-finals); 5 August 1992 (final)
- Competitors: 27 from 18 nations
- Winning time: 53.23

Medalists
1st place, gold medalist(s)		Sally Gunnell; Great Britain
2nd place, silver medalist(s)		Sandra Farmer-Patrick; United States
3rd place, bronze medalist(s)		Janeene Vickers; United States

Official Video

These are the official results of the Women's 400 metres hurdles at the 1992 Summer Olympics in Barcelona, Spain. There were 27 participating athletes plus one non-starter.

The main contenders for the gold medal in Barcelona were the American Sandra Farmer-Patrick, the Soviet World champion Tatyana Ledovskaya and Great Britain's Sally Gunnell. Ledovskaya, who had so narrowly lost the gold to Debbie Flintoff-King at the 1988 Seoul Olympics, won the gold medal at the 1991 World Championships in Tokyo in 53.11 seconds, with Gunnell winning silver in 53.16. Those performances moved Ledovskaya and Gunnell to second and third on the world all-time list behind Marina Stepanova's 1986 world record of 52.94 seconds. Farmer-Patrick, who was fourth in the Tokyo final and whose personal best of 53.37 dated back to 1989, ran the fastest pre-Olympic time of the 1992 season when winning the US Olympic trials in June in 53.62 secs. Other medal contenders included the American Janeene Vickers, who had won the bronze medal in Tokyo in 53.47, and the former world-record holder Margarita Ponomaryova.

In Barcelona, all the main contenders reached the final, with the fastest qualifiers being Gunnell, who won the first semifinal in 53.78, Farmer-Patrick, who won the second semifinal in 53.90, and Ponomaryova, who was second in the second semifinal in 53.98, which was the Russian's fastest time since her 1984 world record run of 53.58 secs.

In the final, Farmer-Patrick in lane 4 held a slight lead over the fifth hurdle. Over the seventh and eighth hurdles, Vickers (lane 1), Gunnell (lane 3) and Farmer-Patrick were virtually level, with Ponomaryova (lane 6) fourth and Ledovskaya (lane 8) fifth. Gunnell's superior technique and better stride pattern saw her move clear in the home straight and she went on to win by three metres in 53.23 secs, the fastest time in the world for 1992. Farmer-Patrick was clear in second, winning silver in 53.69 secs, while Vickers narrowly held on for the bronze medal from a fast-finishing Ledovskaya, both being timed at 54.31 secs.

The following year at the 1993 World Championships in Stuttgart, Gunnell and Farmer-Patrick would both run inside Marina Stepanova's world record. Gunnell won gold in the world record time of 52.74 secs, with Farmer-Patrick again having to settle for silver running 52.79 secs.

== Medalists ==
Gold	Silver	Bronze
Sally Gunnell; Great Britain	Sandra Farmer-Patrick; United States	Janeene Vickers; United States

== Records ==
These were the standing world and Olympic records (in seconds) prior to the 1992 Summer Olympics.

World record	52.94	(Soviet Union) Marina Stepanova	Tashkent (URS)	September 17, 1986
Olympic record	53.17	(Australia) Debbie Flintoff-King	Seoul (KOR)	September 28, 1988

== Final ==
RANK	FINAL	TIME
	Sally Gunnell (GBR)	53.23
	Sandra Farmer-Patrick (USA)	53.69
	Janeene Vickers (USA)	54.31
4.	Tatyana Ledovskaya (EUN)	54.31
5.	Vera Ordina (EUN)	54.83
6.	Margarita Ponomaryova (EUN)	54.83
7.	Deon Hemmings (JAM)	55.58
—	Myrtle Bothma (RSA)	DNF

== Semi finals ==
RANK	HEAT 1	TIME
1.	Sally Gunnell (GBR)	53.78
2.	Vera Ordina (EUN)	54.37
3.	Janeene Vickers (USA)	54.67
4.	Deon Hemmings (JAM)	54.70
5.	Nezha Bidouane (MAR)	55.08
6.	Heike Meißner (GER)	55.35
7.	Frida Johansson (SWE)	55.85
8.	Donalda Duprey (CAN)	56.30

RANK	HEAT 2	TIME
1.	Sandra Farmer-Patrick (USA)	53.90
2.	Margarita Ponomaryova (EUN)	53.98
3.	Tatyana Ledovskaya (EUN)	54.53
4.	Myrtle Bothma (RSA)	54.53
5.	Gowry Retchakan (GBR)	54.63
6.	Tonja Buford (USA)	55.04
7.	Rosey Edeh (CAN)	55.76
8.	Irmgard Trojer (ITA)	56.34

== Heats ==
RANK	HEAT 1	TIME
1.	Sandra Farmer-Patrick (USA)	55.12
2.	Margarita Ponomaryova (EUN)	55.36
3.	Myrtle Bothma (RSA)	55.60
4.	Rosey Edeh (CAN)	55.66
5.	Louise Fraser (GBR)	57.49
—	Addo Ndala (CGO)	DNF
—	Linda Kisabaka (GER)	DNS

RANK	HEAT 2	TIME
1.	Tatyana Ledovskaya (EUN)	55.03
2.	Heike Meißner (GER)	55.62
3.	Gowry Retchakan (GBR)	55.62
4.	Monica Westén (SWE)	56.68
5.	Nicoleta Vornicu (ROU)	57.18
6.	Marta Moreira (POR)	58.24
7.	Liliana Chalá (ECU)	58.55

RANK	HEAT 3	TIME
1.	Janeene Vickers (USA)	55.24
2.	Vera Ordina (EUN)	55.25
3.	Deon Hemmings (JAM)	55.48
4.	Nezha Bidouane (MAR)	55.95
5.	Frida Johansson (SWE)	56.13
6.	Donalda Duprey (CAN)	56.37
7.	Mary-Estelle Kapalu (VAN)	1:00.97

RANK	HEAT 4	TIME
1.	Sally Gunnell (GBR)	54.98
2.	Irmgard Trojer (ITA)	55.49
3.	Tonja Buford (USA)	56.35
4.	Silvia Rieger (GER)	56.61
5.	Miriam Alonso Manteca (ESP)	57.66
6.	Gail Luke (AUS)	58.32
7.	Reawadee Srithoa (THA)	58.80

== See also ==
- 1988 Women's Olympic 400m Hurdles (Seoul)
- 1990 Women's European Championships 400m Hurdles (Split)
- 1991 Women's World Championships 400m Hurdles (Tokyo)
- 1993 Women's World Championships 400m Hurdles (Stuttgart)
- 1994 Women's European Championships 400m Hurdles (Helsinki)
