= Janeene Vickers =

American former athlete (born 1968)

Personal information
- Born: October 3, 1968 (age 57) Torrance, California, U.S.
Medal record
Women's athletics
Representing United States
Olympic Games
Bronze medal – third place	1992 Barcelona	400 m hurdles
World Championships
Bronze medal – third place	1991 Tokyo	400 m hurdles

Janeene Hope Vickers-McKinney, née Vickers, (October 3, 1968) is an American former athlete who competed mainly in the 400 metres hurdles. She won bronze medals in the 400 metres hurdles at the 1992 Olympic Games and the 1991 World Championships. She also won the 1990 US Championship.

== Career ==
Born in Torrance, California, Vickers is a graduate of Pomona High School, where she had an outstanding high school career. She dominated the CIF California State Meet winning both the 100 meter and 300 meter hurdles in both 1986 and 1987, adding the flat 100 meter title in 1987. She was Track and Field News "High School Athlete of the Year" in 1987. She continued to UCLA to where she won three straight NCAA Championships in the 400 hurdles.

Vickers achieved her lifetime best in the 400m hurdles at the 1991 World Championships, where she won the bronze medal in 53.47 seconds, finishing behind the Soviet Union's Tatyana Ledovskaya (53.11) and Great Britain's Sally Gunnell (53.16), but ahead of her American team-mates Sandra Farmer-Patrick (53.95) and Kim Batten (53.98). This performance moved Vickers to seventh on the world all-time list and second on the US all-time list at the time. As of 2018, she ranks 14th on the US all-time list.

Vickers won an Olympic bronze medal at the 1992 Barcelona Games, running 54.31 secs to finish behind Gunnell (53.23) and Farmer-Patrick (53.69), and narrowly ahead of 1991 World champion Ledovskaya, who also clocked 54.31.

On November 4, 2011, Vickers (now Vickers-McKinney) was inducted into the UCLA Athletics Hall of Fame.

== International competitions ==
Year	Competition	Venue	Position	Event	Notes
Representing United States
1986	World Junior Championships	Athens, United States	4th	400 m	52.25
1986	World Junior Championships	Athens, United States	1st	4 × 400 m	3:30.45
1990	Goodwill Games	Seattle, United States	disqualified (3rd)	400 m hurdles	—
1991	World Championships	Tokyo, Japan	3rd	400 m hurdles	53.47
1991	Grand Prix Final	Barcelona, Spain	2nd	400 m hurdles	54.07
1992	Olympic Games	Barcelona, Spain	3rd	400 m hurdles	54.31

== Honours ==
1× Olympic Games Bronze medalist.

1× World Championships Bronze medalist.

1× World U20 champion.

1× In Top 8 at World U20 Championships.

2× NCAA champion.
