= 1990 European Athletics Championships – Women's 400 metres hurdles =

Athletics event

Women's 400 metres hurdles at the European Athletics Championships
- Venue: Stadion Poljud
- Location: Split, Yugoslavia
- Dates: 29 and 31 August 1990
- Competitors: 31 from 18 nations
- Winning time: 53.62 s

Medalists
gold medal	Tatyana Ledovskaya	Soviet Union
silver medal	Anita Protti	Switzerland
bronze medal	Monica Westén	Sweden

These are the official results of the Women's 400 metres hurdles event at the 1990 European Championships in Split, Yugoslavia, held at Stadion Poljud on 29 and 31 August 1990.

== Medalists ==
Gold	Tatyana Ledovskaya; Soviet Union
Silver	Anita Protti; Switzerland
Bronze	Monica Westén; Sweden

== Results ==
=== Final ===
31 August

Rank	Name	Nationality	Time	Notes
1st place, gold medalist(s)	Tatyana Ledovskaya	Soviet Union	53.62	
2nd place, silver medalist(s)	Anita Protti	Switzerland	54.36	
3rd place, bronze medalist(s)	Monica Westén	Sweden	54.75	
4	Gudrun Abt	West Germany	54.97	
5	Margareta Ponomaryova	Soviet Union	55.22	
6	Sally Gunnell	United Kingdom	55.45	
7	Cristina Pérez	Spain	56.09	
	Petra Krug	East Germany	DNS	

=== Semi-finals ===
29 August

==== Semi-final 1 ====
Rank	Name	Nationality	Time	Notes
1	Tatyana Ledovskaya	Soviet Union	54.73	Q
2	Gudrun Abt	West Germany	55.70	Q
3	Cristina Pérez	Spain	55.87	Q
4	Petra Krug	East Germany	55.93	Q
5	Tuija Helander-Kuusisto	Finland	56.04	
6	Nelli Voronkova	Soviet Union	56.59	
7	Jacqui Parker	United Kingdom	57.06	
8	Irmgard Trojer	Italy	57.40	

==== Semi-final 2 ====
Rank	Name	Nationality	Time	Notes
1	Anita Protti	Switzerland	55.05	Q
2	Margareta Ponomaryova	Soviet Union	55.30	Q
3	Sally Gunnell	United Kingdom	55.35	Q
4	Monica Westén	Sweden	55.45	Q
5	Silvia Rieger	West Germany	56.11	
6	Nicoleta Căruţaşu	Romania	56.74	
7	Anna Suurnäkki	Finland	57.66	
8	Gretha Tromp	Netherlands	59.08	

=== Heats ===
29 August

==== Heat 1 ====
Rank	Name	Nationality	Time	Notes
1	Monica Westén	Sweden	55.61	Q
2	Gudrun Abt	West Germany	55.74	Q
3	Cristina Pérez	Spain	55.82	Q
4	Irmgard Trojer	Italy	56.02	q
5	Anna Suurnäkki	Finland	56.76	q
6	Zuzana Machotková	Czechoslovakia	57.33	
7	María Valamatos	Portugal	58.67	
8	Aleksandra Rus	Yugoslavia	59.05	

==== Heat 2 ====
Rank	Name	Nationality	Time	Notes
1	Anita Protti	Switzerland	55.37	Q
2	Sally Gunnell	United Kingdom	55.89	Q
3	Nelli Voronkova	Soviet Union	56.40	Q
4	Gretha Tromp	Netherlands	56.65	q
5	Monika Klebe	Sweden	57.08	
6	Miriam Alonso	Spain	58.35	
7	Puha Neiger	Israel	59.49	
	Ann Maenhout	Belgium	DQ	

==== Heat 3 ====
Rank	Name	Nationality	Time	Notes
1	Margareta Ponomaryova	Soviet Union	55.99	Q
2	Petra Krug	East Germany	56.76	Q
3	Nicoleta Căruţaşu	Romania	56.77	Q
4	Jacqui Parker	United Kingdom	56.84	q
5	Ewa Johansson	Sweden	57.38	
6	Marjana Lužar	Yugoslavia	59.19	
7	Marta Moreira	Portugal	61.78	
	Yolanda Tello	Spain	DQ	

==== Heat 4 ====
Rank	Name	Nationality	Time	Notes
1	Tatyana Ledovskaya	Soviet Union	55.02	Q
2	Tuija Helander-Kuusisto	Finland	56.80	Q
3	Silvia Rieger	West Germany	56.95	Q
4	Gowry Retchakan	United Kingdom	57.03	
5	Marina Filipović	Yugoslavia	57.57	NR
6	Marie-Christine Cazier	France	57.85	
7	Mari Bjone	Norway	59.65	

== Participation ==
According to an unofficial count, 31 athletes from 18 countries participated in the event.

- Belgium (1)
- Czechoslovakia (1)
- East Germany (1)
- Finland (2)
- France (1)
- Israel (1)
- Italy (1)
- Netherlands (1)
- Norway (1)
- Portugal (2)
- Romania (1)
- Soviet Union (3)
- Spain (3)
- Sweden (3)
- Switzerland (1)
- United Kingdom (3)
- West Germany (2)
- Yugoslavia (3)

== See also ==
- 1988 Women's Olympic 400m Hurdles (Seoul)
- 1991 Women's World Championships 400m Hurdles (Tokyo)
- 1992 Women's Olympic 400m Hurdles (Barcelona)
