= Athletics at the 1986 Commonwealth Games – Women's 400 metres hurdles =

Women's 400 metres hurdles at the Commonwealth Games

The women's 400 metres hurdles event at the 1986 Commonwealth Games was held on 27 and 28 July at the Meadowbank Stadium in Edinburgh.

The winning margin was 1.61 seconds which as of 2024 remains the only time the women's 400 metres hurdles was won by more than 1.4 seconds at these games.

== Medalists ==
Gold	Silver	Bronze
Debbie Flintoff; Australia	Donalda Duprey; Canada	Jenny Laurendet; Australia

== Results ==
=== Heats ===
Qualification: First 3 of each heat (Q) and the next 2 fastest (q) qualified for the final.

Rank	Heat	Name	Nationality	Time	Notes
1	1	Gwen Wall	Canada	57.38	Q
2	1	Debbie Flintoff	Australia	58.06	Q
3	2	Jenny Laurendet	Australia	58.25	Q
4	2	Yvette Wray	England	58.60	Q
5	1	Aileen Mills	England	58.65	Q
6	1	Alyson Vandenbroek-Evans	Wales	58.83	q
7	2	Donalda Duprey	Canada	58.95	Q
8	2	Elaine McLaughlin	Northern Ireland	59.36	q
9	1	Simone Gandy	England	1:00.36	
10	2	Andrea Page	Canada	1:00.96	
11	2	Moira McBeath	Scotland	1:04.03	

=== Final ===
Rank	Lane	Name	Nationality	Time	Notes
1st place, gold medalist(s)	4	Debbie Flintoff	Australia	54.94	GR
2nd place, silver medalist(s)	2	Donalda Duprey	Canada	56.55	
3rd place, bronze medalist(s)	5	Jenny Laurendet	Australia	56.57	
4	6	Gwen Wall	Canada	57.49	
5	3	Yvette Wray	England	57.59	
6	7	Aileen Mills	England	58.01	
7	1	Elaine McLaughlin	Northern Ireland	58.28	
8	8	Alyson Vandenbroek-Evans	Wales	58.31	
