= Athletics at the 1990 Commonwealth Games – Women's 400 metres hurdles =

Women's 400 metres hurdles at the Commonwealth Games

The women's 400 metres hurdles event at the 1990 Commonwealth Games was held on 28 and 29 January at the Mount Smart Stadium in Auckland.

== Medalists ==
Gold	Silver	Bronze
Sally Gunnell; England	Debbie Flintoff-King; Australia	Jenny Laurendet; Australia

== Results ==
=== Heats ===
Qualification: First 4 of each heat (Q) and the next 1 fastest (q) qualified for the final.

Rank	Heat	Name	Nationality	Time	Notes
1	2	Debbie Flintoff-King	Australia	56.25	Q
2	1	Sally Gunnell	England	56.81	Q
3	1	Lorraine Hanson	England	57.14	Q
4	1	Jenny Laurendet	Australia	57.20	Q
5	1	Rose Tata-Muya	Kenya	57.28	Q
6	1	Donalda Duprey	Canada	57.77	q
7	2	Rosey Edeh	Canada	57.81	Q
8	2	Wendy Cearns	England	58.00	Q
9	2	Elaine McLaughlin	Northern Ireland	58.48	Q
10	2	Jill McDermid	Canada	59.37	
11	1	Kim Petersen	New Zealand	59.56	
12	2	Anna Shattky	New Zealand	1:01.33	
	2	Styliani Theocharous	Cyprus	DQ	

=== Final ===
Rank	Lane	Name	Nationality	Time	Notes
1st place, gold medalist(s)	4	Sally Gunnell	England	55.38	
2nd place, silver medalist(s)	3	Debbie Flintoff-King	Australia	56.00	
3rd place, bronze medalist(s)	5	Jenny Laurendet	Australia	56.74	
4	8	Wendy Cearns	England	57.53	
5	1	Elaine McLaughlin	Northern Ireland	57.54	
6	6	Lorraine Hanson	England	57.58	
7	9	Rosey Edeh	Canada	57.86	
8	7	Donalda Duprey	Canada	58.31	
9	2	Rose Tata-Muya	Kenya	59.93	
