= Wendy Cearns =

English hurdler

Wendy Cearns née Griffiths
Personal information
- Nationality: British (English)
- Born: 25 August 1960 (age 65)

Sport
- Sport: Athletics
- Event: hurdles
- Club: Essex Ladies AC

Wendy Cearns (née Griffiths, born 25 August 1960) is an English former athlete who competed in the 400 metres hurdles. She won the 1981 UK Championships and 1989 AAA Championships titles, the latter in a lifetime best of 56.05 secs. Representing England she went on to finish fourth at the 1990 Commonwealth Games in Auckland, New Zealand.

== Career ==
As Wendy Griffiths, she finished third at the 1980 UK Championships, before winning the 1981 UK Championships ahead of Sue Morley in 58.51 secs. She went on to finish second behind Morley at the 1982 UK Championships in 58.08 secs, and second behind Gladys Taylor at the 1984 UK Championships, both running 58.2 secs.

Competing as Wendy Cearns, she narrowly missed out on Olympic selection in 1988 after she finished fourth at the AAA Championships (incorporating the Olympic trials) in 57.01, just behind Simone Laidlow who ran 57.00 in third. Cearns then improved her best to 56.85 a week later, to rank number three in the UK for that year behind Sally Gunnell and Elaine McLaughlin. In 1989, she won the AAA Championships title in a lifetime best of 56.05, to rank second in the UK behind Gunnell. She went on to finish fourth in the final at the Commonwealth Games in January 1990.

== International competitions ==
Year	Competition	Venue	Position	Event	Notes
Representing England
1990	Commonwealth Games	Auckland, New Zealand	4th	400 m hurdles	57.53
