= Ledovskoy =

Ledovskoy or Ledovskoi (Russian: Ледовской, from лёд meaning ice) is a Russian masculine surname, its feminine counterpart is Ledovskaya (Russian: Ледовская). It may refer to

- Tatyana Ledovskaya (born 1966), Russian hurdler
