= Simone Laidlow =

British hurdler

Simone Laidlow née Gandy
Personal information
- Nationality: British (English)
- Born: 28 July 1965 (age 60) Southampton, England
- Height: 172 cm (5 ft 8 in)
- Weight: 52 kg (115 lb)

Sport
- Sport: Track and field
- Event: 400 metres hurdles
- Club: Borough of Hounslow AC

Simone Lucy Laidlow (née Gandy, born 28 July 1965) is a female English former 400 metres hurdler. She represented Great Britain in the women's 400 metres hurdles at the 1988 Seoul Olympics. She finished second at the UK Championships three times (1985, 1986 and 1988). Her twin sister, Dawn Gandy, is also a former international athlete.

== Career ==
Born in Southampton, Simone Gandy finished second at the UK Championships in 1985 and 1986, and third in 1984 and 1987. Her best performance in these years was 57.56 secs at the England v Romania international in Bucharest on 14 June 1986. She represented England at the Commonwealth Games in Edinburgh, Scotland, on 26 July 1986, where she was eliminated in the heats with 60.31.

In 1988, now competing as Simone Laidlow, she finished second behind Elaine McLaughlin at the UK Championships in 57.66. Two months later she finished third behind Sally Gunnell and McLaughlin at the AAA Championships/Olympic trials, earning Olympic selection in a lifetime best of 57.00, just ahead of Wendy Cearns in fourth with 57.01. Her 57.00 would stand as the Hounslow AC club record until broken by Nicola Sanders in 2005. At the 1988 Olympic Games in Seoul, she was eliminated in the heats running 59.28.

== International competitions ==
| Year | Competition | Venue | Position | Notes |
Representing Great Britain / England
| 1983 | European Junior Championships | Schwechat, Austria | 13th (sf) | 60.37 (59.72 heat) |
| 1986 | Commonwealth Games | Edinburgh, United Kingdom | 9th (h) | 60.31 |
| 1988 | Olympic Games | Seoul, South Korea | 30th (h) | 59.28 |
(#) Indicates overall position in qualifying heats (h) or semifinals (sf)
