= Lyn Grime =

New Zealand hurdler

Personal information
- Nationality: New Zealand
- Born: Lynnette Kay Grime; 10 September 1962 (age 64)
- Height: 174 cm (5 ft 9 in)
- Weight: 60 kg (132 lb)

Sport
- Sport: Track and field
- Event: 400 metres hurdles

Lynnette Kay Grime (later Lyn Massey and now Lynnette O'Connor; born 10 September 1962) is a New Zealand hurdler.

Grime was born in 1962 in Matamata. She attended Matamata College from 1976 to 1980 where she was coached by Warwick Fenton. From 1979, she was a New Zealand record holder, first in 100 m hurdles junior, and from 1984 in 400 m hurdles senior. She competed in the women's 400 metres hurdles at the 1984 Summer Olympics and is listed as New Zealand Olympian number 440. She competed at the 1991 World Championships in Athletics in Tokyo and came 17th in the 400 m hurdles.

The O'Connors live in Greymouth with their three children, and she works at Cycle Journeys Greymouth.
