= Frida Svensson (athlete) =

Swedish hurdler

Personal information
- Born: 5 January 1970 (age 55)

Sport
- Country: Sweden
- Sport: track and field

Frida Svensson (born Johansson on 5 January 1970) is a Swedish track and field athlete who competed in the 400 metres hurdles. She represented Sweden at the IAAF World Championships in Athletics on three occasions, qualifying for the semifinals in both Tokyo 1991 and Stuttgart 1993. She also reached the semifinals of the women's 400 metres hurdles at the 1992 Barcelona Olympics.

She later married Swedish tennis player Jonas Svensson.

== Singing ==
Together with Erica Johansson and Maria Akraka, she sang back up for Nick Borgen when he competed in Melodifestivalen 1993 performing the song "We Are All the Winners". The song placed second.

== International competitions ==
All results regarding 400 metres hurdles

| Year | Competition | Venue | Position | Notes |
Representing Sweden
| 1988 | World Junior Championships | Sudbury, Canada | 4th | 58.71 |
| 1989 | European Junior Championships | Varaždin, Yugoslavia | semis | 58.81 |
| 1991 | World Championships | Tokyo, Japan | 10th (sf) | 55.36 |
| 1992 | Olympic Games | Barcelona, Spain | 14th (sf) | 55.85 |
| 1993 | World Championships | Stuttgart, Germany | 21st (sf) | 56.48 |
| 1994 | European Championships | Helsinki, Finland | 15th (sf) | 57.54 |
| 1999 | World Championships | Seville, Spain | 20th (h) | 55.59 |
(#) Indicates overall position in qualifying heats (h) or semifinals (sf)
