= We Are All the Winners =

Single by Nick Borgen
- A-side: "We Are All the Winners"
- Released: 1993
- Genre: Dansband music, rock, Schlager
- Length: Mariann Grammofon
- Label: Rival
- Songwriter: Peter Karlsson

"We Are All the Winners" is a song mixing lyrics in English and Swedish. Written by Nick Borgen, it was and performed by himself at Melodifestivalen 1993, where it ended up second behind Arvingarna's Eloise.

With the song, however, Nick Borgen scored a huge 1993 hit in Sweden, peaking at 17th position at the Swedish singles chart, and staying at Svensktoppen for 23 weeks between 11 April-11 September 1993, topping the chart during the first 14 weeks.

During the original performance, Erica Johansson, Frida Johansson and Maria Akraka appeared as background singers, under the name "Team Sweden". While the song's lyrics describes a man standing outdoors playing the accordion in all types of weather, the song has later become heavily associated with sports.

In 1994, while keeping the title, he released a version in Norwegian, as his native Norway had qualified for the FIFA World Cup. He sang it together with Jan Åge Fjørtoft.

== Charts ==
Chart (1993)	Peak position
Sweden (Sverigetopplistan)	17
