= Jenny Laurendet =

Australian hurdler (born 1962)

Personal information
- Born: 5 July 1962 (age 63)
- Height: 1.64 m (5 ft 5 in)
- Weight: 50 kg (110 lb)

Sport
- Sport: Athletics
- Event(s): 400 m hurdles, 100 m hurdles
- Club: Northern Suburbs AC

Jennifer Laurendet (née Low; born 5 July 1962) is a retired Australian hurdler. She represented her country in the 400 metres hurdles at the 1988 Summer Olympics as well as three Commonwealth Games and the 1987 World Championships.

Her personal best in the 400 metres hurdles is 56.31 seconds set in Sydney in 1989.

== International competitions ==
Year	Competition	Venue	Position	Event	Notes
Representing Australia
1982	Commonwealth Games	Brisbane, Australia	11th (h)	100 m hurdles	13.85
1986	Commonwealth Games	Edinburgh, United Kingdom	9th (h)	100 m hurdles	13.56
1986	Commonwealth Games	Edinburgh, United Kingdom	3rd	400 m hurdles	56.57
1987	World Championships	Rome, Italy	20th (h)	400 m hurdles	57.41
1988	Olympic Games	Seoul, South Korea	21st (h)	400 m hurdles	56.44
1988	Olympic Games	Seoul, South Korea	–	4 × 400 m relay	DNF
1990	Commonwealth Games	Auckland, New Zealand	6th	100 m hurdles	13.52
1990	Commonwealth Games	Auckland, New Zealand	3rd	400 m hurdles	56.74
