= Myrtle Bothma =

South African hurdler

Personal information
- Nationality: South African
- Born: 18 February 1964 (age 62) East London, South Africa

Sport
- Sport: Track and field
- Event: 400 metres hurdles
Medal record
Women's athletics
Representing South Africa
African Championships
Gold medal – first place	1992 Belle Vue Harel	400 m hurdles
Silver medal – second place	1992 Belle Vue Harel	4×400 m

Myrtle Bothma (born 18 February 1964) is a South African hurdler. She competed in the women's 400 metres hurdles at the 1992 Summer Olympics.
