= Monica Westén =

Swedish heptathlete and hurdler

Personal information
- Born: 15 March 1966 (age 60) Huddinge, Sweden
- Height: 1.75 m (5 ft 9 in)
- Weight: 62 kg (137 lb)

Sport
- Sport: Track and field
- Events: 400 metres hurdles, 800 metres
- Club: IF Göta
Medal record
Women's athletics
Representing Sweden
European Championships
Bronze medal – third place	1990 Split	400 m hurdles

Monica Viola Westén-Rydén (born Westén, 15 March 1966) is a retired Swedish athlete who competed primarily in the 400 metres hurdles. She represented her country at the 1992 Summer Olympics, as well as two World Championships, in 1991 and 1993. She won the bronze medal at the 1990 European Championships. Earlier in her career she was a combined events specialist.

Her personal best in the event is 54.69 seconds set in Stockholm in 1990.

== Competition record ==
Year	Competition	Venue	Position	Event	Notes
Representing Sweden
1986	Goodwill Games	Moscow, Soviet Union	16th	Heptathlon	5365 pts
1989	European Indoor Championships	The Hague, Netherlands	10th	High jump	1.80 m
1990	European Indoor Championships	Glasgow, United Kingdom	13th	High jump	1.80 m
1990	European Championships	Split, Yugoslavia	3rd	400 m hurdles	54.75
1991	World Championships	Tokyo, Japan	11th (sf)	400 m hurdles	55.51
1992	Olympic Games	Barcelona, Spain	18th (h)	400 m hurdles	56.68
1993	World Championships	Stuttgart, Germany	16th (sf)	400 m hurdles	55.88
1994	European Indoor Championships	Paris, France	5th (h)	800 m	2:04.11
1994	European Championships	Helsinki, Finland	11th (sf)	400 m hurdles	56.38
1994	European Championships	Helsinki, Finland	9th (sf)	4 × 400 m relay	3:32.36
