= Margarita Ponomaryova =

Russian hurdler (1963–2021)

Personal information
- Full name: Margarita Anatolyevna Ponomaryova
- Born: 19 June 1963 Balkhash, Kazakh SSR, Soviet Union
- Died: 16 September 2021 (aged 58)

Sport
- Country: Russia
- Sport: Women's athletics
Medal record
World Championships
Silver medal – second place	1993 Stuttgart	4 × 400 m relay
Bronze medal – third place	1993 Stuttgart	400 m hurdles

Margarita Anatolyevna Ponomaryova (Russian: Маргарита Хромова-Пономарева; 19 June 1963 – 16 September 2021), also known as Margarita Khromova, was a hurdler from Russia, best known for setting the world record in the women's 400 metres hurdles in 1984 with 53.58 secs.

Ponomaryova was known by her married name of Khromova from 1985 to 1989, before reverting to her maiden name from 1990 onward.

== Career ==
Ponomaryova was born in Balkhash, Kazakh SSR in the former Soviet Union. She began her international career by winning two medals at the 1981 European Junior Championships.

In 1984, she made a dramatic improvement in the 400 metres hurdles to break the world record with 53.58 secs on 22 June in Kiev, to become the first woman to run below 54 seconds for the event. She was prevented from competing in that years Los Angeles Olympics due to the Soviet boycott.

1984 proved to be the only year where Ponomaryova would be the world's number one 400 m hurdler, however her international career would continue for another decade. In 1985, now competing as Margarita Khromova, she finished sixth in the World Cup in Canberra. In 1986, she reached the European Championship final in Stuttgart, placing eighth. The following year she was a semi-finalist at the World Championships in Rome, narrowly missing the final.

Having failed to make the 1988 Seoul Olympics, she won her biggest individual title when winning at the 1989 World Student Games (Universiade). In 1990, (as Margarita Ponomaryova), she finished fifth in the European Championship final in Split. She won the 1991 European Cup ahead of Sally Gunnell, before finishing eighth later that year in the World Championship final in Tokyo.

Ponomaryova represented the Unified team at the 1992 Barcelona Olympics. In the semi-finals she ran 53.98 sec, to qualify for the final as the third fastest. However, in the final she only managed 54.83 to finish sixth. At the following years World Championships in Stuttgart, she reached her peak running 53.48 sec to win the bronze medal. This was her first (and only) individual medal at Olympic or World Championship level. The race was won by Sally Gunnell in a then world record of 52.74. Ponomaryova also won a silver medal in the 4x400 metres relay.

== International competitions ==
Year	Competition	Venue	Position	Event	Notes
Representing Soviet Union
1981	European Junior Championships	Utrecht, Netherlands	3rd	400 m hurdles	57.45
1981	European Junior Championships	Utrecht, Netherlands	2nd	4 × 400 m	3:31.41
1984	Friendship Games	Prague, Czechoslovakia	3rd	400 m hurdles	54.65
1985	World Cup	Canberra, Australia	6th	400 m hurdles	56.90
1986	Goodwill Games	Moscow, Soviet Union	4th	400 m hurdles	55.08
1986	European Championships	Stuttgart, Germany	8th	400 m hurdles	55.56
1987	World Championships	Rome, Italy	semi-final	400 m hurdles	54.86
1989	Universiade	Duisburg, Germany	1st	400 m hurdles	57.03
1989	Universiade	Duisburg, Germany	3rd	4 × 400 m	3:28.60
1990	European Championships	Split, Yugoslavia	5th	400 m hurdles	55.22
1991	World Indoor Championships	Seville, Spain	2nd	4 × 400 m	3:27.95
1991	European Cup	Frankfurt, Germany	1st	400 m hurdles	54.42
1991	World Championships	Tokyo, Japan	8th	400 m hurdles	55.27
1991	Grand Prix Final	Barcelona, Spain	5th	400 m hurdles	
Representing Unified Team
1992	Olympic Games	Barcelona, Spain	6th	400 m hurdles	54.83
1992	World Cup	Havana, Cuba	3rd	400 m hurdles	56.46
Representing Russia
1993	World Championships	Stuttgart, Germany	3rd	400 m hurdles	53.48
1993	World Championships	Stuttgart, Germany	2nd	4 × 400 m	3:18.38
1993	Grand Prix Final	London, United Kingdom	4th	400 m hurdles	

Records
Preceded by Ana Ambrazienė	Women's 400 m hurdles world record holder 22 June 1984 – 22 September 1985	Succeeded by Sabine Busch
Sporting positions
Preceded by Ana Ambrazienė	Women's 400 m hurdles best year performance 1984	Succeeded by Sabine Busch
