= Den glider in =

Single by Nick Borgen & Sweden men's national ice hockey team

from the album Golden Hockey Night 95
- A-side: "Den glider in"
- Released: 1995
- Genre: dansband music, rock
- Label: Rival
- Songwriter: Peter Karlsson

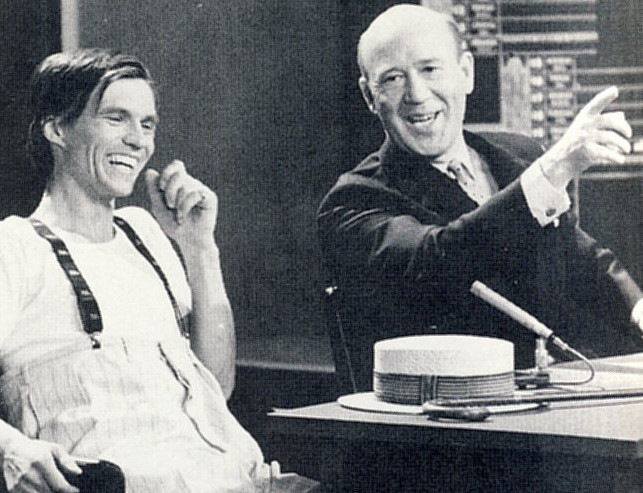
The 1962 Lennart Hyland (right) report was referenced to in the song, which is also named after the report.

"Den glider in" is a song written by Peter Karlsson, acting as fight song for the Sweden men's national ice hockey team during the 1995 IIHF World Ice Hockey Championship in Sweden. Nick Borgen recorded the song with the players, and released it as a promo single. It became highly popular in Finland when their team defeated Sweden in the tournament final. Later, the song has become popular as played whenever a home team scores.

The words Den glider in originate from a famous call by Swedish radio reporter Lennart Hyland. During the Sweden vs Canada match in the 1962 IIHF World Ice Hockey Championship, Nils Nilsson scored the final goal into an empty net, sealing the Swedes' 5-3 victory. Sweden would go on to win the entire tournament.

The song also became a Svensktoppen hit, charting between 29 April-6 May 1995, with a first position followed up with a third position.

Sweden reached the final during the 1995 IIHF World Ice Hockey Championship, losing to Finland. This was the Finns' first ice hockey world championship. Finnish musician Kirka recorded a new version of the song to celebrate the victory. The composer would have allowed translating the song into Finnish but as the record company refused to give permission for a translation, Kirka sang it in Swedish.
