= Donalda Duprey =

Canadian hurdler

Personal information
- Full name: Donalda Duprey-Abadie
- Born: 1 March 1967 (age 59) Fredericton, New Brunswick, Canada
- Height: 1.68 m (5 ft 6 in)
- Weight: 56 kg (123 lb)

Sport
- Sport: Athletics
- Event: 400 m hurdles
- Club: Saugeen Track Club
Medal record
Representing Canada
Commonwealth Games
Silver medal – second place	1986 Edinburgh	400m hurdles
Bronze medal – third place	1994 Victoria	4x400m relay
Pan American Games
Silver medal – second place	1995 Mar del Plata	100m hurdles

Donalda Duprey-Abadie (born 1 March 1967 in Fredericton, New Brunswick) is a Canadian retired athlete who specialised in the hurdling events. She represented her country at the 1992 Summer Olympics, as well as three outdoor and one indoor World Championships.

Duprey competed for the LSU Lady Tigers track and field team in the NCAA. Her daughter Heather Abadie was the bronze medallist in the pole vault at the 2021 World Athletics U20 Championships.

== Competition record ==
Year	Competition	Venue	Position	Event	Notes
Representing Canada
1984	Pan American Junior Championships	Nassau, Bahamas	2nd	400 m hurdles	58.99
1986	Commonwealth Games	Edinburgh, United Kingdom	2nd	400 m hurdles	56.55
1990	Commonwealth Games	Auckland, New Zealand	8th	400 m hurdles	58.31
1991	World Championships	Tokyo, Japan	30th (h)	100 m hurdles	13.75
1991	World Championships	Tokyo, Japan	17th (h)	400 m hurdles	56.38
1992	Olympic Games	Barcelona, Spain	15th (sf)	400 m hurdles	56.30
1993	World Indoor Championships	Toronto, Ontario, Canada	13th (h)	400 m	54.52
1993	World Indoor Championships	Toronto, Ontario, Canada	–	4 × 400 m relay	DQ
1993	World Indoor Championships	Toronto, Ontario, Canada	2nd	Medley relay	3:56.34
1993	World Championships	Stuttgart, Germany	30th (h)	100 m hurdles	13.50
1993	World Championships	Stuttgart, Germany	19th (sf)	400 m hurdles	56.16
1993	World Championships	Stuttgart, Germany	9th (h)	4 × 100 m relay	44.36
1994	Jeux de la Francophonie	Bondoufle, France	3rd	100 m hurdles	13.27
1994	Jeux de la Francophonie	Bondoufle, France	1st	400 m hurdles	55.10
1994	Commonwealth Games	Victoria, British Columbia, Canada	5th	100 m hurdles	13.75
1994	Commonwealth Games	Victoria, British Columbia, Canada	4th	400 m hurdles	55.39
1994	Commonwealth Games	Victoria, British Columbia, Canada	3rd	4 × 400 m relay	3:32.52
1994	World Cup	London, United Kingdom	4th	400 m hurdles	56.67
1995	Pan American Games	Mar del Plata, Argentina	2nd	100 m hurdles	13.16 (w)
1995	Pan American Games	Mar del Plata, Argentina	4th	400 m hurdles	57.26
1997	World Championships	Athens, Greece	21st (h)	400 m hurdles	56.73

== Personal bests ==
Outdoor

- 100 metres hurdles – 13.09 (+1.4 m/s) (Lausanne 1994)
- 400 metres hurdles – 55.42 (0.0 m/s) (São Paulo 1994)

Indoor

- 400 metres – 54.52 (Toronto 1993)
