= Nick Borgen =

Norwegian–Swedish singer and writer musician (born 1952)

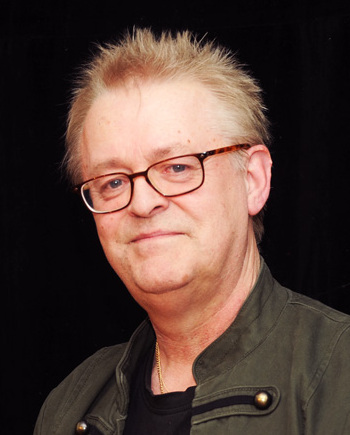
- Borgen in 2013

Background information
- Born: 5 January 1952 (age 74); Andenes, Norway
- Genres: Pop, rock
- Occupations: Singer, songwriter, writer
- Instrument: Acoustic guitar
- Years active: 1969–present

Nils Thore "Nick" Borgen (born 5 January 1952 in Andenes, Nordland, is a Norwegian–Swedish musician, singer and writer.

== Life and career ==
He made the songs "We Are All the Winners" and "Den glider in". Between 1990 and 2003, he had his own dansband, Nick Borgens orkester.
