= Choi Se-beom =

South Korean sprinter

Personal information
- Nationality: South Korean
- Born: 4 March 1972 (age 53)

Sport
- Sport: Sprinting
- Event: 4 × 400 metres relay

Choi Se-beom (born 4 March 1972) is a South Korean sprinter. She competed in the women's 4 × 400 metres relay at the 1988 Summer Olympics.
