= Elaine McLaughlin =

Northern Irish hurdler

Personal information
- Nationality: British (Northern Irish)
- Born: 17 November 1963 (age 62) Derry, Northern Ireland
- Height: 167 cm (5 ft 6 in)
- Weight: 58 kg (128 lb)

Sport
- Sport: Athletics
- Event: 400 metres hurdles
- Club: Edinburgh Woollen Mills

Elaine Mary H. McLaughlin (born 17 November 1963) is a Northern Irish former hurdler. She competed for Great Britain and Northern Ireland in the women's 400 metres hurdles at the 1988 Seoul Olympics. She was also a two-time Commonwealth Games finalist for Northern Ireland (1986, 1990) and won the UK Championships 400m hurdles title three times (1987–89).

== Biography ==
McLaughlin finished seventh for Northern Ireland in the 400 metres hurdles final at the 1986 Commonwealth Games, won the 1987 UK Championships and finished second behind Sally Fleming at the 1987 WAAA Championships.

McLaughlin's best season came in 1988. With a pre-season best of 57.48 secs in 1987, she ran 56.22 to win the second of her three UK Championship titles in June 1988, improved her best to 56.09 in August 1988, when finishing second to Sally Gunnell at the AAA Championships/Olympic trials, earning Olympic selection, and ended the season achieving a lifetime best of 55.91 in the semifinals at the 1988 Seoul Olympics in September. This performance ranked her second on the UK all-time list at that time, and still (as of 2018) ranks her 12th on the UK all-time list and remains the Northern Irish record.

McLaughlin won her third consecutive UK Championships title in 1989 and went on to finish fifth in the 1990 Commonwealth Games final in January 1990.

== International competitions ==
Year	Competition	Venue	Position	Notes
Representing Great Britain and Northern Ireland
1986	Commonwealth Games	Edinburgh, United Kingdom	7th	58.28
1988	Olympic Games	Seoul, South Korea	12th (sf)	55.91
1990	Commonwealth Games	Auckland, New Zealand	5th	57.54
(sf) Indicates overall position in semifinals

=== National titles ===
- UK Championships (1987, 1988, 1989)
