= Barbara Johnson (athlete) =

Irish hurdler

Personal information
- Nationality: Irish
- Born: 5 December 1962 (age 63)

Sport
- Sport: Track and field
- Event: 400 metres hurdles

Barbara Johnson (born 5 December 1962) is an Irish hurdler. She competed in the women's 400 metres hurdles at the 1988 Summer Olympics.
