= Susanne Losch =

German hurdler

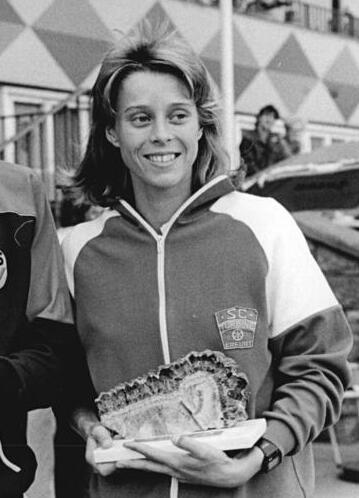
- Losch in 1989

Personal information
- Nationality: German
- Born: 12 February 1966 (age 60)

Sport
- Sport: Track and field
- Event: 400 metres hurdles

Susanne Losch (born 12 February 1966) is a German hurdler. She competed in the women's 400 metres hurdles at the 1988 Summer Olympics.
