= Beate Holzapfel =

German high jumper

Personal information
- Born: 9 April 1966 (age 60)

Sport
- Sport: Track and field

Beate Holzapfel (born 9 April 1966) is a retired West German high jumper.

She finished ninth at the 1990 European Indoor Championships. She represented the sports club LG Bayer Leverkusen, and won the bronze medal at the West German championships in 1989.

Her personal best jump was 1.90 metres, achieved in July 1991 in Hannover.
