= Anita Protti =

Swiss hurdler (born 1964)

Medal record

Women's athletics

Representing Switzerland

European Championships
Silver medal – second place	1990 Split	400 m hurdles

Anita Protti (born 4 August 1964) is a Swiss former athlete who competed mainly in the 400 metres hurdles. She won the silver medal in the 400m hurdles at the 1990 European Championships, and bronze medals in the 400 metres at the 1989 European Indoor Championships and 1991 World Indoor Championships. Her 400m hurdles best of 54.25 secs has stood as the Swiss record since 1991.

== Career ==
Born in Lausanne, Protti specialised in the 400 metres hurdles. Her greatest career achievement was when she won the silver medal at the 1990 European Championships in Athletics.

Protti missed most of the 1992 and 1993 seasons because of an achilles injury.

== International competitions ==
Year	Competition	Venue	Position	Event	Notes
Representing Switzerland
1988	Olympic Games	Seoul, South Korea	semi-final	400 m hurdles	54.56
1989	European Indoor Championships	The Hague, Netherlands	3rd	400 metres	52.57
1990	European Championships	Split, Yugoslavia	2nd	400m hurdles	54.36
1990	European Championships	Split, Yugoslavia	6th	4 × 400 m relay	3:29.94
1991	World Indoor Championships	Seville, Spain	3rd	400 metres	51.41
1991	World Championships	Tokyo, Japan	6th	400 m hurdles	54.25
1994	Jeux de la Francophonie	Bondoufle, France	4th	400 m hurdles	56.47
1994	European Championships	Helsinki, Finland	10th (sf)	400 m hurdles	56.15
1994	European Championships	Helsinki, Finland	6th	4 × 400 m relay	3:28.78

=== Personal bests ===
- 400 metres hurdles: 54.25 s (1991), Swiss record
- 400 metres: 51.32 s (1990), Swiss record (1990–2017)
- 800 metres: 1.59.98 min (1990)

Awards
Preceded by (Switzerland) Vreni Schneider	Swiss Sportswoman of the Year; 1990	Succeeded by (Switzerland) Vreni Schneider
