= Sandra Farmer-Patrick =

Jamaican-born American athlete

Personal information
- Born: Sandra Miller; 8 August 1962 (age 64) Jamaica
Medal record
Women's athletics
Representing the United States
Olympic Games
Silver medal – second place	1992 Barcelona	400 m hurdles
World Championships
Silver medal – second place	1993 Stuttgart	400 m hurdles
Representing Jamaica
Pan American Games
Silver medal – second place	1987 Indianapolis	400 m hurdles

Sandra Marie Farmer-Patrick (née Miller, born 18 August 1962) is a Jamaican-born American former athlete who competed mainly in the 400 metres hurdles. She won silver medals in that event at the 1992 Olympic Games in Barcelona, and at the 1993 World Championships in Stuttgart. She also won the 400 metres hurdles at the World Cup in 1989 and 1992. Her best time for the event of 52.79 seconds (1993), is the former U.S. record. That performance once ranked her second on the world all-time list, and as of 2024, ranks her 15th on the world all-time list.

== Early life ==
Farmer-Patrick was born Sandra Miller in Kingston, Jamaica and lived there until she was eleven years old bouncing between an aunt and her grandmother. She moved to Brooklyn, New York adopted by her great-aunt Vita Farmer and took on the Farmer last name. Vita brought Sandra up in a deeply Pentecostal environment, attending church six times a week, three times on Sunday. To get out of the house, she joined the Flashettes Track Club.

== Track and field career ==
At first, Farmer was forced to run in a dress for religious reasons. She continued to run in short skirts and tutus as part of her more flamboyant professional career, whenever she had the choice of uniform. Her stylish, flashy attire was perhaps as notorious as FloJo at the time.

Farmer set an American Junior record of 58.90 in the 400 hurdles at age 14, which ranked her number five among all Americans. Scholarship money she won in the Colgate Games kept her in St Angela Hall Academy. She lowered her time to 58.31 while in high school. She briefly attended the University of Arizona, but ended up running for California State University, Los Angeles (at the same time as the Howard sisters). In addition to some very fast relays with the sisters, she still holds the school record in the 400 hurdles. She was elected into the CSULA Athletic Hall of Fame in 2007.

Starting in 1982, she represented Jamaica in international competition, until 1987, removing her name from the American rankings list. At the 1984 Los Angeles Olympics, she finished eighth in the 400 m hurdles final in a sub-par race, the first time the event was held in the Olympics.

Farmer was ranked in the world's top ten for the 400 m hurdles for the first time in 1987. In July of that year, she ran 54.59 to win a silver medal at the Pan American Games in Indianapolis behind Judi Brown-King. Then in September at the World Championships in Rome, she finished fourth in the final in 54.38, only 0.07 from a medal.

After marrying David Patrick and hyphenating her name, Farmer-Patrick began competing for the US in 1988 and attempted to qualify for the US Olympic team for Seoul, but was disqualified in her semi-final at the US Olympic trials for inadvertently running out of her lane. Having dual citizenship, she had the option to run for Jamaica, but by switching to the US, some Jamaican newspapers had branded her as a traitor. Her appeal to the Jamaican Federation went unanswered.

In 1989, she was unbeaten in the 400 m hurdles and was the fastest woman in the world at the event, improving her best to 53.37. In September, she won the World Cup title in Barcelona, running 53.84 to defeat Tatyana Ledovskaya and Sally Gunnell. In 1990, she won the Goodwill Games title in 55.16, defeating Schowonda Williams.

A medal favourite for the 1991 World Championships in Tokyo, Farmer-Patrick ended up fourth in a time of 53.95, in a race won by Tatyana Ledovsakya, with Sally Gunnell second and Janeene Vickers third. Still she was ranked number 1 in the world for 1989, 1991 and 1992.

She competed for the United States in the 1992 Barcelona Olympics, where she ran 53.69 to win the silver medal behind her greatest rival, Great Britain's Sally Gunnell. A month after the Olympics, she successfully defended her World Cup title in Havana, ahead of Gowry Retchakan and Margarita Ponomaryova. The following year at the 1993 World Championships held in Stuttgart, Germany, she broke the existing world record running 52.79. But Gunnell also broke the record finishing .05 faster at 52.74, passing after the last hurdle and pushing the diving Farmer-Patrick to another silver medal.

She was ranked number 1 in the US from 1988 to 1993. Having missed the 1994 season due to pregnancy, Farmer-Patrick returned in 1995 and finished fourth at the US Championships. She then qualified for the 1996 Atlanta Olympics. At her third and final games, she was eliminated in the semi-finals, failing to reach the final by just one-one hundredth of a second, a performance which was later disqualified due to a high testosterone-epitestosterone (T-E) ratio.

In 2019, she was inducted into the National Track and Field Hall of Fame.

== Personal life ==
Farmer-Patrick married fellow 400 m hurdler David Patrick in January 1988 and is currently living in Austin, Texas with their two children David and Sierra. Sierra played collegiate volleyball and ran track at the University of Texas.

== Achievements ==
Year	Competition	Venue	Position	Notes
Representing Jamaica
1982	Central American and Caribbean Games	Havana, Cuba	1st	58.15sec
1982	Commonwealth Games	Brisbane, Australia	9th	59.07
1984	Olympic Games	Los Angeles, United States	8th	57.15
1986	Goodwill Games	Moscow, Soviet Union	7th	56.28
1987	Pan American Games	Indianapolis, United States	2nd	54.59
1987	World Championships	Rome, Italy	4th	54.38
1987	Grand Prix Final	Brussels, Belgium	3rd	55.30
Representing United States
1989	Grand Prix Final	Fontvieille, Monaco	1st	54.60
1989	World Cup	Barcelona, Spain	1st	53.84
1990	Goodwill Games	Seattle, United States	1st	55.16
1991	World Championships	Tokyo, Japan	4th	53.95
1991	Grand Prix Final	Barcelona, Spain	1st	53.74
1992	Olympic Games	Barcelona, Spain	2nd	53.69
1992	World Cup	Havana, Cuba	1st	55.38
1993	World Championships	Stuttgart, Germany	2nd	52.79
1993	Grand Prix Final	London, England	1st	53.69
1996	Olympic Games	Atlanta, United States	DQ (semi-final)	DQ (54.73)

- Won the Women's Overall Grand Prix title in 1993 (with Sonia O'Sullivan 2nd and Stefka Kostadinova 3rd)
- Won the Overall Grand Prix 400 m hurdles title in 1989, 1991 and 1993
- 3-time US Champion at 400 metres hurdles; in 1989, 1992 and 1993): 2nd in 1986, 1987, 1990 and 1991

Sporting positions
Preceded by (Australia) Debbie Flintoff-King	Women's 400m Hurdles Best Year Performance; 1989	Succeeded by (Soviet Union) Tatyana Ledovskaya
