= LaTanya Sheffield =

American hurdler (born 1963)

Personal information
- Born: October 11, 1963 (age 62) El Cajon, California, U.S.
Medal record
Women's athletics (track and field)
Representing United States
Pan American Games
Bronze medal – third place	1987 Indianapolis	400 m hurdles
U.S. Olympic Festival
Gold medal – first place	1987 Raleigh-Durham	400 m hurdles
Gold medal – first place	1993 San Antonio	400 m hurdles

LaTanya Sheffield (born October 11, 1963, in Los Angeles, California) is a retired hurdler from the United States, who finished in eighth place in the women's 400 metres hurdles final at the 1988 Summer Olympics.

== Career ==
Sheffield was the 1985 NCAA championm running for San Diego State University. She won the bronze medal in the same event at the 1987 Pan American Games.

After the 2000 Olympic trials and an illustrious career, she announced her retirement. She then lived in Tucson, Arizona, working as the head coach of a track team known as "Pops Tracks Club" and at Canyon del Oro High School. She is currently coaching at Long Beach State University.

== Personal life ==
Sheffield's daughter, Jaide Stepter Baynes, ran for the University of Southern California, where she was a three-time Pac-12 Conference champion at 400 meters hurdles. She has also competed in several international competitions for the United States. Her brother Rahn is the head coach at her alma mater, San Diego State.

Sheffield was an assistant coach for women's sprints and hurdles for the United States in 2016 and 2020.
