= Yang Gyeong-hui =

South Korean sprinter

Personal information
- Nationality: South Korean
- Born: 25 January 1971 (age 54)

Sport
- Sport: Sprinting
- Event: 400 metres

Yang Gyeong-hui (born 25 January 1971) is a South Korean sprinter. She competed in the women's 400 metres at the 1988 Summer Olympics.
