= Helga Halldórsdóttir =

Icelandic athlete

Personal information
- Nationality: Icelandic
- Born: 22 April 1963 (age 63)

Sport
- Sport: Track and field
- Event: 400 metres hurdles

Helga Halldórsdóttir (born 22 April 1963) is an Icelandic hurdler. She competed in the women's 400 metres hurdles at the 1988 Summer Olympics.
