= Irmgard Trojer =

Italian hurdler

Personal information
- Nationality: Italian
- Born: 16 March 1964 (age 62) Innichen, Italy
- Height: 1.70 m (5 ft 7 in)
- Weight: 57 kg (126 lb)

Sport
- Country: Italy
- Sport: Athletics
- Event: 400 metres hurdles
- Club: SSV Brunico

Achievements and titles
- Personal best: 400 m hs: 55.42 (1991)
Medal record
Mediterranean Games
Silver medal – second place	1991 Tunis	400 m hs
Bronze medal – third place	1987 Latakia	400 m hs
Universiade
Bronze medal – third place	1989 Duisburg	400 m hs

Irmgard Trojer (born 16 March 1964) is an Italian former 400 metres hurdler. She won a bronze medal in the 400m hurdles at the 1989 Universiade and competed at the Olympic Games in 1988 and 1992.

== Biography ==
Born in Innichen, Italy, Trojer won three Individual medals at International athletics competitions. She participated at the Olympic Games in 1988 and 1992. In 1988, she was eliminated in the heats, despite being the ninth fastest overall. In 1992, she reached the semifinals. She also reached the semifinals at the IAAF World Championships in Athletics in 1987 and 1991.

== Olympic and World results ==
Year	Competition	Venue	Position	Event	Performance	Notes
1987	World Championships	Rome, Italy	15th (semis)	400 m hurdles	57.86	
1988	Olympic Games	Seoul, South Korea	heats	400 m hurdles	55.74	
1991	World Championships	Tokyo, Japan	12th (semis)	400 m hurdles	55.66	
1992	Olympic Games	Barcelona, Spain	16th (semis)	400 m hurdles	56.34	55.49 in heat

== National titles ==
Trojer is a nine-time Italian champion.

- 6 wins in 400 metres hurdles (1987, 1988, 1989, 1990, 1991, 1992)
- 1 win in 400 metres (1990)
- 2 wins in 400 metres indoor (1990, 1992)

== See also ==
- Italian all-time top lists - 400 metres hurdles
