= Kim Sun-ja (athlete) =

South Korean sprinter (born 1966)

Personal information
- Nationality: South Korean
- Born: 16 June 1966 (age 59)
- Height: 165 cm (5 ft 5 in)
- Weight: 52 kg (115 lb; 8 st 3 lb)

Sport
- Sport: Sprinting
- Event: 4 × 400 metres relay

Kim Sun-ja (born 16 June 1966) is a South Korean sprinter. She competed in the women's 4 × 400 metres relay at the 1988 Summer Olympics.
