= Tatyana Ledovskaya =

Soviet and Belarusian athletics competitor

Personal information
- Born: 21 May 1966 (age 60) Shchyokino, Tula Oblast, Soviet Union

Sport
- Sport: Track and field
Medal record
Representing Soviet Union
Olympic Games
Gold medal – first place	1988 Seoul	4 × 400 m relay
Silver medal – second place	1988 Seoul	400 m hurdles
World Championships
Gold medal – first place	1991 Tokyo	400 m hurdles
Gold medal – first place	1991 Tokyo	4 × 400 m relay
European Championships
Gold medal – first place	1990 Split	400 m hurdles
Silver medal – second place	1990 Split	4 × 400 m relay
Summer Universiade
Silver medal – second place	1987 Zagreb	4 x 400 m relay

Tatyana Mikhailovna Ledovskaya (Belarusian: Таццяна Міхайлаўна Ледаўская, Russian: Татьяна Михайловна Ледовская; born 21 May 1966) is a retired athlete who competed mainly in the 400 metres hurdles. She represented the Soviet Union and later Belarus, training in Minsk.

== Biography ==
She competed for the USSR in the 1988 Summer Olympics held in Seoul, South Korea in the 400 metre hurdles, where she won the silver medal. She followed this up with a leg in the 4 × 400 metres relay where she won the gold medal with her teammates individual gold medalist Olga Bryzgina, individual bronze medalist Olga Nazarova and Mariya Pinigina, setting a new world record of 3:15.17 minutes which is still unbeaten (as of 2026). Ledovskaya is also the 1991 World Champion in 400 m hurdles and 4 × 400 m relay. She later represented Belarus, including at the 1996 Olympics.

Ledovskaya was awarded the Order of the Badge of Honor.

== Achievements ==
Year	Competition	Venue	Position	Event	Notes
Representing Soviet Union / Unified Team / Belarus
1988	Olympic Games	Seoul, South Korea	2nd	400 m hurdles	53.18
1988	Olympic Games	Seoul, South Korea	1st	4 × 400 m	3:15.17
1989	World Cup	Barcelona, Spain	2nd	400 m hurdles	54.86
1990	European Championships	Split, Yugoslavia	1st	400 m hurdles	53.62
1990	European Championships	Split, Yugoslavia	2nd	4 × 400 m	3:23.34
1991	World Championships	Tokyo, Japan	1st	400 m hurdles	53.11
1991	World Championships	Tokyo, Japan	1st	4 × 400 m	3:18.43
1992	Olympic Games	Barcelona, Spain	4th	400 m hurdles	54.31
1993	World Championships	Stuttgart, Germany	semi-final	400 m hurdles	54.60
1995	World Championships	Gothenburg, Sweden	semi-final	400 m hurdles	Disq (56.03 in ht)
1996	Olympic Games	Atlanta, United States	semi-final	400 m hurdles	54.99

Sporting positions
Preceded by (United States) Sandra Farmer-Patrick	Women's 400 m Hurdles Best Year Performance; 1990–1991	Succeeded by (United Kingdom) Sally Gunnell
