= Tuija Helander =

Finnish hurdler (born 1961)

Personal information
- Nationality: Finnish
- Born: 23 May 1961 (age 65)

Sport
- Sport: Track and field
- Event: 400 metres hurdles

Tuija Helander (born 23 May 1961) is a Finnish former hurdler. She finished seventh in the 400m hurdles final at the 1984 Los Angeles Olympics, and fifth in the 400m hurdles final at the 1987 World Championships, in a career-best time of 54.62 secs.

Between 1977 and 1990, Helander won the Finnish 400m hurdles title 10 times and also won the 400m title in 1985 and 1987. From 1987, she competed under her then married name of Tuija Helander-Kuusisto.

== International competitions ==
Year	Competition	Venue	Position	Notes
Representing Finland
1983	World Championships	Helsinki, Finland	28th (h)	59.43
1984	Olympic Games	Los Angeles, United States	7th	56.55
1986	European Championships	Stuttgart, Germany	10th (sf)	56.21
1987	World Championships	Rome, Italy	5th	54.62
1990	European Championships	Split, Yugoslavia	9th (sf)	56.09
(#) Indicates overall position in qualifying heats (h) or semifinals (sf)
