= Cornelia Ullrich =

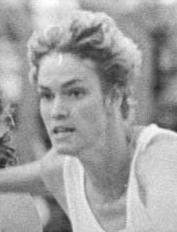
- Cornelia Ullrich in 1988

Medal record

Women's athletics

Representing East Germany

World Championships
Bronze medal – third place	1987 Rome	400 m hurdles

European Championships
Bronze medal – third place	1986 Stuttgart	400 m hurdles

Cornelia Ullrich (née Feuerbach; born 26 April 1963 in Halberstadt) is a retired East German hurdler. She represented the sports team SC Magdeburg.

== Biography ==
She won the bronze medals at the 1986 European Championships and the 1987 World Championships.

Her personal best time was 53.58 seconds, achieved in August 1987 in Potsdam. This result which ranks her second among German 400 m hurdlers, only behind Sabine Busch
