= Gretha Tromp =

Dutch sprinter and hurdler

Personal information
- Born: 21 February 1964 (age 62) Heerhugowaard, the Netherlands
- Height: 1.74 m (5 ft 9 in)
- Weight: 60 kg (132 lb)

Sport
- Sport: Sprint, hurdling
- Club: Atletiekvereniging Hera
Medal record
Representing the Netherlands
Summer Universiade
Gold medal – first place	1991 Sheffield	400 m hurdles
Silver medal – second place	1991 Sheffield	400 m

Margaretha Maria "Gretha" Tromp (born 21 February 1964) is a retired Dutch sprinter and hurdler. She competed at the 1988 Summer Olympics in the 100 m hurdles, 400 m hurdles and 4×100 metres relay, but failed to reach the final in any event. She won two medals at the 1991 Summer Universiade.
