= Gudrun Abt =

German hurdler (born 1962)

Gudrun Maria Abt (born 3 August 1962) is a retired German hurdler. She was born in Riedlingen.

== Biography ==
At the 1988 Summer Olympics in Seoul she finished sixth in 400 m hurdles in a personal best time of 54.04 seconds. This ranks her fifth among German 400 m hurdlers, behind Sabine Busch, Cornelia Ullrich, Ellen Fiedler and Heike Meißner.

At the 1988 Olympics, Abt also finished fourth in 4 × 400 m relay for West Germany together with Ute Thimm, Helga Arendt and Andrea Thomas. She had previously finished fifth at the 1987 World Championships with Ute Thimm, Helga Arendt and Gisela Kinzel. At the 1990 European Championships in Athletics in Split she finished fourth in 400 m hurdles.

Abt represented the sports club TSV Genkingen, and became West German champion in 1986, 1987 and 1988.

== International competitions ==
Year	Competition	Venue	Position	Event	Notes
Representing West Germany / Germany
1986	European Championships	Stuttgart, Germany	11th (sf)	400 m hurdles	56.66
1987	World Championships	Rome, Italy	10th (sf)	400 m hurdles	55.59
1987	World Championships	Rome, Italy	5th	4 × 400 m relay	3:24.94
1988	Olympic Games	Seoul, South Korea	6th	400 m hurdles	54.03
1988	Olympic Games	Seoul, South Korea	4th	4 × 400 m relay	3:22.49
1990	European Championships	Split, Yugoslavia	4th	400 m hurdles	54.97
1991	World Championships	Tokyo, Japan	15th (sf)	400 m hurdles	56.17
(sf) indicates overall position in semifinal round
