= Debbie Flintoff-King =

Australian athletics competitor

Personal information
- Full name: Debra Lee Flintoff-King
- Born: 20 April 1960 (age 66) Melbourne, Australia
Medal record
Women's athletics
Representing Australia
Olympic Games
Gold medal – first place	1988 Seoul	400 m hurdles
World Championships
Silver medal – second place	1987 Rome	400 m hurdles
Commonwealth Games
Gold medal – first place	1982 Brisbane	400 m hurdles
Silver medal – second place	1982 Brisbane	4 × 400 m relay
Gold medal – first place	1986 Edinburgh	400 m
Gold medal – first place	1986 Edinburgh	400 m hurdles
Silver medal – second place	1986 Edinburgh	4 × 400 m relay
Silver medal – second place	1990 Auckland	400 m hurdles
Silver medal – second place	1990 Auckland	4 × 400 m relay

Debra ("Debbie") Lee Flintoff-King, (OAM), née Flintoff, (20 April 1960) is a retired Australian athlete, and winner of the women's 400 m hurdles event at the 1988 Seoul Olympics.

== Athletics career ==
Flintoff-King was born in Melbourne, the daughter of Richmond footballer Les Flintoff, and made her international debut at the 1982 Brisbane Commonwealth Games, winning the 400 m hurdles in a Commonwealth record time of 55.89.

Flintoff finished sixth in the inaugural event at the 1984 Los Angeles Olympics. In 1986, after setting Australian records at both the 400 m flat and 400 m hurdles during the year, she won both events at the 1986 Edinburgh Commonwealth Games. Flintoff participated in Prince Edward's charity television special The Grand Knockout Tournament in 1987.

She then won a silver medal at the 1987 World Championships and became the first Australian athlete to win an IAAF Grand Prix Final in that year, taking out her specialty 400 m Hurdles event.

She won a gold medal at the 1988 Seoul Olympics despite having just received news of her sister, Noeline's death. Her Olympic record time of 53.17 seconds is the current Australian record.

Flintoff-King was one of the bearers of the Olympic Torch at the opening ceremony of the 2000 Sydney Olympics. She carried the Olympic Torch at the stadium, as one of the runners for the final segment, before the lighting of the Olympic Flame.

Married to her coach Phil King with three children (Amber King, Teisha King and Frazer King) Flintoff-King coached Australian sprinter Lauren Hewitt in the early 1990s and has mentored World Champion Jana Pittman.

== Honours ==
In 1987, Flintoff-King received a Medal of the Order of Australia and was inducted into the Sport Australia Hall of Fame. She received an Australian Sports Medal in 2000.

Sporting positions
Preceded by Sabine Busch	Women's 400m Hurdles Best Year Performance; 1988	Succeeded by Sandra Farmer-Patrick
