= Sally Gunnell =

British track-and-field athlete

Sally Gunnell, OBE, DL
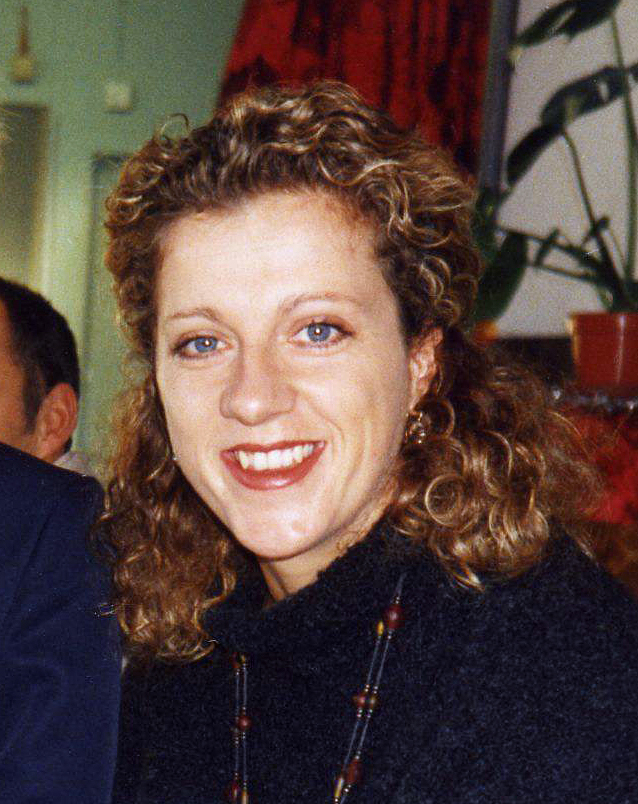
- Gunnell in 1995

Personal information
- Full name: Sally Jane Janet Gunnell
- Nationality: English
- Born: 29 July 1966 (age 60) Chigwell, Essex, England
- Height: 1.66 m (5 ft 5 1/2 in)
- Weight: 57.5 kg (9 st 1 lb)

Sport
- Sport: Athletics
- Event: 400 m hurdles
- Club: Essex Ladies
Medal record
Women's Athletics
Representing Great Britain
Olympic Games
Gold medal – first place	1992 Barcelona	400 m hurdles
Bronze medal – third place	1992 Barcelona	4 × 400 m relay
World Championships
Gold medal – first place	1993 Stuttgart	400 m hurdles
Silver medal – second place	1991 Tokyo	400 m hurdles
Bronze medal – third place	1993 Stuttgart	4 × 400 m relay
Goodwill Games
Gold medal – first place	1994 Saint Petersburg	400 m hurdles
IAAF World Cup
Gold medal – first place	1994 London	400 m hurdles
Gold medal – first place	1994 London	4 × 400 m relay
Bronze medal – third place	1989 Barcelona	400 m hurdles
European Championships
Gold medal – first place	1994 Helsinki	400 m hurdles
Bronze medal – third place	1990 Split	4 × 400 m relay
European Cup
Gold medal – first place	1993 Rome	400 m hurdles
Gold medal – first place	1994 Birmingham	400 m hurdles
Gold medal – first place	1996 Madrid	400 m hurdles
Gold medal – first place	1997 Munich	400 m hurdles
Silver medal – second place	1989 Gateshead	400 m hurdles
Silver medal – second place	1991 Frankfurt	400 m hurdles
European Indoor Championships
Gold medal – first place	1989 The Hague	400 m
Representing England
Commonwealth Games
Gold medal – first place	1986 Edinburgh	100 m hurdles
Gold medal – first place	1990 Auckland	400 m hurdles
Gold medal – first place	1990 Auckland	4 × 400 m relay
Gold medal – first place	1994 Victoria	400 m hurdles
Gold medal – first place	1994 Victoria	4 × 400 m relay
Silver medal – second place	1990 Auckland	100 m hurdles

Sally Jane Janet Gunnell, OBE, DL (born 29 July 1966) is a British former track-and-field athlete, who won the 1992 Olympic gold medal in the 400 metres hurdles. During a 24-month period between 1992 and 1994, Gunnell won every international event open to her, claiming Olympic Games, World Championship, European Championship, Commonwealth Games, Goodwill Games, IAAF World Cup and European Cup golds in the event, and breaking the British, European and World records in it. She is the only female British athlete to have won all four 'majors'; Olympic, World, European and Commonwealth titles, and was the first female 400 metres hurdler in history to win the Olympic and World titles and break the world record. Her former world record time of 52.74 secs in 1993 is still the current British record. She was named World and European Female Athlete of the Year in 1993, and was made an MBE in 1993 and an OBE in 1998.

== Early life ==
Gunnell was born in Chigwell, Essex, England to Les and Rosemary Gunnell, and grew up on the family's three-hundred-acre farm and attended the local primary and West Hatch High schools in Chigwell.

== Athletics career ==
Gunnell started out in athletics with the Essex Ladies club as an accomplished long jumper and heptathlete, before specialising in hurdling. In 1984, she narrowly missed Olympic selection at both heptathlon, with a score of 5680 points, and in the 100 metres hurdles, where she set a UK junior record of 13.30 secs.

In 1986, having won the AAAs and UK titles, Gunnell won the Commonwealth Games gold medal in the 100 metres hurdles in Edinburgh, ahead of Wendy Jeal and 1984 Olympic heptathlon champion Glynis Nunn. She would remain the UK number one in the event over the next four seasons and reach the semi-finals at the 1987 World Championships and 1988 Olympics in the event.

Gunnell first attempted the 400 m hurdles event in 1987, with a 59.9 clocking. In 1988, in her first full season at the event, she would reach the Olympic final in Seoul. At the Olympic trials in Birmingham, she broke the UK record with 55.40. In Seoul she would improve this twice, first to 54.48 in the semis then to 54.03, to finish fifth in the final. This would remain her best time in the event for three years.

In 1989, Gunnell won the European Indoor title at 400 metres. Outdoors, she finished second in the 400 m hurdles at the European Cup behind East Germany's Petra Krug, but ahead of Olympic silver medallist Tatyana Ledovskaya. In September at the World Cup, she was third behind Sandra Farmer-Patrick of the US and Ledovsakya, but this time ahead of Krug. In January 1990, she defeated 1988 Olympic champion Debbie Flintoff-King to win the Commonwealth title in Auckland. The 1990 summer season however was disappointing, when she only finished sixth at the European Championships.

Gunnell entered into the best phase of her career in 1991, improving her own three-year-old UK record three times. In Monaco she ran 53.78, in Zurich she ran 53.62, then at the World Championships in Tokyo, she won the silver medal behind Ledovskaya with 53.16, the then third fastest time of all time. Ledovskaya won with 53.11.

Gunnell won the 400 m hurdles at the 1992 Olympic Games in Barcelona, running 53.23 to defeat Sandra Farmer-Patrick. She also anchored the British 4 × 400 m quartet to a bronze medal. In 1993, she reached her peak, when she set the world record in the 400 hurdles to win gold in the World Championships in Stuttgart, winning in 52.74, narrowly ahead of Farmer-Patrick who ran 52.79, also inside the old record.

This record was broken by Kim Batten in 1995, but is still the British record. Gunnell was the first female 400 metres hurdler to have won the Olympic and World titles and broken the world record, a feat since achieved by both Dalilah Muhammad and Sydney McLaughlin-Levrone.

In 1994, Gunnell added the European title to her collection, winning comfortably in 53.33. She also won the Goodwill Games ahead of Kim Batten, successfully defended her Commonwealth title and won the World Cup title in London. 1994 was her third (and final) year as the world's number one. She missed most of 1995 due to injury, an injury from which she would never fully recover. Her defence of her Olympic title in Atlanta in 1996 was cut short when she pulled up injured in the semi-finals. This seemed a particularly cruel blow, as this race occurred on her 30th birthday. Also in 1996, she worked as a Red Cross ambassador in Angola. In September 1997, she retired after a recurrence of an Achilles tendon injury forced her to pull out of the World Championships semi-final.

Gunnell remains the only woman to have won the European, World, Commonwealth and Olympic 400-metre hurdles titles.

Gunnell is now involved as one of the ambassadors for McCain's Track & Field partnership with UK Athletics.

== Television ==
Gunnell worked as a television presenter, predominantly for the BBC, until 2006. She also co-hosted the game show Body Heat (1994–96) on ITV with Mike Smith and Jeremy Guscott.

Gunnell was one of the four celebrity guests in the ITV's You Bet! – Series 7 (1993–94), co-winning with Michaela Strachan and donating her winnings to a charity working to find a cure for breast cancer.

In September 1997, she was the recipient of the "big red book" on This is Your Life.

In summer 2006, she was a celebrity showjumper in the BBC's Sport Relief event Only Fools on Horses. She also won a Weakest Link Sporting Heroes Special, first broadcast on 25 July 2009 on BBC One.

She took part in a celebrity version of TV show Total Wipeout which aired on 2 January 2010.

In 2012, Gunnell took part on ITV's The Cube and won £20,000 for her charity.

Gunnell features in the 2024 documentary Colin Jackson: Resilience, talking about her time as a teammate of Jackson and in particular the 1992 Olympic 110m hurdles event.

== Recognition ==
In the 1993 New Year Honours, Gunnell was made an MBE (Member of the Order of the British Empire) and in the 1998 Birthday Honours, she was made an OBE (Officer of the Order of the British Empire). In 2011, Gunnell was appointed Deputy Lieutenant of West Sussex.

In 2012, Gunnell was one of five Olympians chosen as part of a series body-casting artworks by Louise Giblin exhibited in London and copies were being sold in aid of the charity Headfirst.

== Personal life ==
Gunnell is married to fellow athlete Jonathan Bigg, and has three sons; Finley, Luca and Marley. She lives near Brighton in East Sussex.

== National titles ==
- 7-times AAAs 100 m hurdles champion (1986–1989, 1991–1993)
- 2-time AAAs 400 m hurdles champion (1988, 1996)
- 2-time UK Champion – 100 m hurdles (1986) 400 m hurdles (1997)
- 2-time AAAs Indoor Champion – 200 m (1987) 400 m (1988)

== International competitions ==
Year	Competition	Venue	Position	Event	Notes
Representing Great Britain / England
1983	European Junior Championships	Schwechat, Austria	13th	Heptathlon	5395
1986	Commonwealth Games	Edinburgh, Scotland	1st	100 m hurdles	13.29
1986	European Championships	Stuttgart, West Germany	17th (h)	100 m hurdles	13.22 (wind: 0.0 m/s)
1987	World Championships	Rome, Italy	10th (sf)	100 m hurdles	13.06
1988	European Indoor Championships	Budapest, Hungary	4th	400 m	51.77
1988	Olympic Games	Seoul, South Korea	11th (sf)	100 m hurdles	13.13
1988	Olympic Games	Seoul, South Korea	5th	400 m hurdles	54.03
1988	Olympic Games	Seoul, South Korea	6th	4 × 400 m	3:26.89
1989	European Indoor Championships	The Hague, Netherlands	1st	400 m	52.04
1989	World Indoor Championships	Budapest, Hungary	6th	400 m	52.60
1989	World Cup	Barcelona, Spain	3rd	400 m hurdles	55.25
1990	Commonwealth Games	Auckland, New Zealand	2nd	100 m hurdles	13.12
1990	Commonwealth Games	Auckland, New Zealand	1st	400 m hurdles	55.38
1990	Commonwealth Games	Auckland, New Zealand	1st	4 × 400 m	3:28.08
1990	European Indoor Championships	Glasgow, Scotland	4th	400 m	53.38
1990	European Championships	Split, Yugoslavia	6th	400 m hurdles	55.45
1990	European Championships	Split, Yugoslavia	3rd	4 × 400 m	3:24.78
1991	World Championships	Tokyo, Japan	2nd	400 m hurdles	53.16
1991	World Championships	Tokyo, Japan	4th	4 × 400 m	3:22.01
1992	Olympic Games	Barcelona, Spain	1st	400 m hurdles	53.23
1992	Olympic Games	Barcelona, Spain	3rd	4 × 400 m	3:24.23
1993	World Championships	Stuttgart, Germany	1st	400 m hurdles	52.74
1993	World Championships	Stuttgart, Germany	3rd	4 × 400 m	3:23.41
1994	European Championships	Helsinki, Finland	1st	400 m hurdles	53.33
1994	European Championships	Helsinki, Finland	4th	4 × 400 m	3:24.14
1994	Commonwealth Games	Victoria, Canada	1st	400 m hurdles	54.51
1994	Commonwealth Games	Victoria, Canada	1st	4 × 400 m	3:27.06
1994	World Cup	London, England	1st	400 m hurdles	54.80
1994	World Cup	London, England	1st	4 × 400 m	3:27.36
1996	Olympic Games	Atlanta, United States	DNF (sf)	400 m hurdles	55.29 (heat)
1997	World Indoor Championships	Paris, France	13th (h)	400 m	53.05
1997	World Indoor Championships	Paris, France	6th	4 × 400 m	3:32.25
1997	World Championships	Athens, Greece	DNS (sf)	400 m hurdles	54.53 (heat)
(#) Indicates overall position in qualifying heats (h) or semifinals (sf)

Note: Represented Great Britain in all events excluding the Commonwealth Games, where she represented England and the 1989 World Cup, where she represented Europe.

Awards
Preceded by None	Women's European Athlete of the Year; 1993	Succeeded by Irina Privalova
Sporting positions
Preceded by Tatyana Ledovskaya	Women's 400 m Hurdles Best Year Performance; 1992–1994	Succeeded by Kim Batten
